= 1971 New Orleans Saints season =

NFL team season

- Owner: John W. Mecom Jr.
- General manager: Vic Schwenk
- Head coach: J. D. Roberts
- Home stadium: Tulane Stadium

Results
- Record: 4–8–2
- Division place: 4th NFC West
- Playoffs: Did not qualify
- Pro Bowlers: None

The 1971 New Orleans Saints season was the Saints' fifth season. The Saints drafted Archie Manning with their first round pick, the second overall.

Manning led the Saints to their first opening day victory in franchise history, scoring a touchdown run on a rollout on the final play of a 24–20 victory over the Los Angeles Rams, New Orleans' first over Los Angeles following four consecutive losses, including the Saints' inaugural game in 1967. Four weeks later, Manning engineered a 24–14 victory over the Dallas Cowboys, who would return to Tulane Stadium in January and win Super Bowl VI over the Miami Dolphins.

== Offseason ==
=== NFL draft ===
1971 New Orleans Saints draft
| Round | Pick | Player | Position | College | Notes |
| 1 | 2 | Archie Manning * | Quarterback | Mississippi | |
Made roster * Made at least one Pro Bowl during career

== Personnel ==
=== Staff ===
1971 New Orleans Saints staff
| Front office: President – John W. Mecom Jr.; General manager – Vic Schwenk; Head coaches: Head coach – J. D. Roberts; Offensive coaches: Offensive Coordinator – Ken Shipp; Offensive Backfield – Charlie Tate; Offensive Line – Jim Royer | Defensive coaches: Defensive Coordinator/Defensive Line – Jim Champion; Linebackers – Marv Matuszak; Defensive Backfield – Bud Whitehead |

=== Roster ===
1971 New Orleans Saints roster
| Quarterbacks (QB): 14 Edd Hargett; 8 Archie Manning; Running backs (RB): 40 Hoyle Granger; 35 Bob Gresham; 43 David Kopay; 42 Jim Strong; 47 Virgil Robinson; Wide receivers (WR): 46 Danny Abramowicz; 41 Bob Newland; Tight ends (TE): 34 Carlos Bell; 36 Don Burchfield; 83 Dave Parks | Offensive linemen (OL): 51 John Didion C; 78 Glen Ray Hines T; 70 Sam Holden T; 50 Jake Kupp G; 76 Don Morrison T; 65 Remi Prudhomme C; 67 John Shinners G; 61 Del Williams G; Defensive linemen (DL): 77 Dan Goich DT; 89 Dave Long DT; 87 Richard Neal DE; 72 Joe Owens DE; 82 Bob Pollard DT; 80 Mike Walker DE | Linebackers (LB): 53 Dick Absher MLB; 59 Wayne Colman OLB; 60 Carl Cunningham OLB; 55 Jim Flanigan MLB; 64 Ray Hester OLB; 54 Tom Roussel OLB; Defensive backs (DB): 18 Hugo Hollas FS; 20 Delles Howell CB; 11 Bivian Lee CB; 22 Dee Martin CB; 21 Reynaud Moore SS; 23 Doug Wyatt SS; Special teams (ST): 15 Charlie Durkee K; 10 Julian Fagan P | Practice squad: 29 Richard Harvey CB; 12 Bobby Scott QB; 86 Creston Whitaker WR; Reserve: 88 Leo Carroll DE (IR); 25 Al Dodd WR (IR); 84 Larry Estes DE (IR); 28 James Ford RB (IR); -- Bart Graves DE (IR); 52 John Huard LB (IR); 74 Doug Mooers DT/DE (IR); 57 Mike Morgan LB (IR); Rookies in italics |

== Regular season ==
=== Schedule ===
| Week | Date | Opponent | Result | Record | Venue | Attendance |
|---|---|---|---|---|---|---|
| 1 | September 19 | **Los Angeles Rams** | **W** 24–20 | 1–0 | Tulane Stadium | 70,915 |
| 2 | September 26 | **San Francisco 49ers** | **L** 20–38 | 1–1 | Tulane Stadium | 81,595 |
| 3 | October 3 | at Houston Oilers | **T** 13–13 | 1–1–1 | Astrodome | 47,966 |
| 4 | October 10 | at Chicago Bears | **L** 14–35 | 1–2–1 | Soldier Field | 55,049 |
| 5 | October 17 | Dallas Cowboys | **W** 24–14 | 2–2–1 | Tulane Stadium | 83,088 |
| 6 | October 24 | at **Atlanta Falcons** | **L** 6–28 | 2–3–1 | Atlanta Stadium | 58,850 |
| 7 | October 31 | at Washington Redskins | **L** 14–24 | 2–4–1 | RFK Stadium | 53,041 |
| 8 | November 7 | Oakland Raiders | **T** 21–21 | 2–4–2 | Tulane Stadium | 83,102 |
| 9 | November 14 | at **San Francisco 49ers** | **W** 26–20 | 3–4–2 | Candlestick Park | 45,138 |
| 10 | November 21 | Minnesota Vikings | **L** 10–23 | 3–5–2 | Tulane Stadium | 83,130 |
| 11 | November 28 | at Green Bay Packers | **W** 29–21 | 4–5–2 | Milwaukee County Stadium | 48,035 |
| 12 | December 5 | at **Los Angeles Rams** | **L** 28–45 | 4–6–2 | Los Angeles Memorial Coliseum | 73,610 |
| 13 | December 12 | Cleveland Browns | **L** 17–21 | 4-7-2 | Tulane Stadium | 72,794 |
| 14 | December 19 | **Atlanta Falcons** | **L** 20–24 | 4-8-2 | Tulane Stadium | 75,954 |
Note: Intra-division opponents are in **bold** text.

=== Game summaries ===
==== Week 1 ====
| Team | 1 | 2 | 3 | 4 | Total |
|---|---|---|---|---|---|
| Rams | 0 | 3 | 3 | 14 | 20 |
| • **Saints** | 0 | 3 | 14 | 7 | 24 |

- Date: September 19
- Location: Tulane Stadium • New Orleans, Louisiana
- Game start: 1:00 p.m. CDT
- Game weather: 86 °F (30 °C) • Wind 6 mph (9.7 km/h) S
- Referee: Bob Frederic

Scoring summary
| 2 | NO | Skip Butler 32 yard field goal | Saints 3–0 |
| 2 | LA | David Ray 31 yard field goal | Tie 3–3 |
| 3 | NO | Dave Parks 6 yard pass from Archie Manning (Skip Butler kick) | Saints 10–3 |
| 3 | NO | Bob Gresham 2 yard run (Skip Butler kick) | Saints 17–3 |
| 3 | LA | David Ray 27 yard field goal | Saints 17–6 |
| 4 | LA | Les Josephson 29 yard pass from Roman Gabriel (David Ray kick) | Saints 17–13 |
| 4 | LA | Les Josephson 1 yard run (David Ray kick) | Rams 20–17 |
| 4 | NO | Archie Manning 1 yard run (Skip Butler kick) | Saints 24–20 |

=== Standings ===
NFC West
| | W | L | T | PCT | DIV | CONF | PF | PA | STK |
|---|---|---|---|---|---|---|---|---|---|
| San Francisco 49ers | 9 | 5 | 0 | .643 | 2–4 | 7–4 | 300 | 216 | W2 |
| Los Angeles Rams | 8 | 5 | 1 | .615 | 4–1–1 | 7–3–1 | 313 | 260 | W1 |
| Atlanta Falcons | 7 | 6 | 1 | .538 | 3–2–1 | 4–6–1 | 274 | 277 | W1 |
| New Orleans Saints | 4 | 8 | 2 | .333 | 2–4 | 4–7 | 266 | 347 | L3 |

Note: Tie games were not officially counted in the standings until 1972.
