= 1971 NFL draft =

American football player selection

General information
- Date: January 28–29, 1971
- Location: Belmont Plaza Hotel; New York City

Overview
- 442 total selections in 17 rounds
- League: NFL
- First selection: Jim Plunkett, QB; Boston Patriots
- Mr. Irrelevant: Charles Hill, WR; Oakland Raiders
- Most selections (22): Pittsburgh Steelers; San Francisco 49ers
- Fewest selections (11): Washington Redskins
- Hall of Famers: 5: RB John Riggins; DE Jack Youngblood; LB Jack Ham; OT Dan Dierdorf; WR Harold Carmichael

The 1971 NFL draft was held January 28–29, 1971, at the Belmont Plaza Hotel in New York City, New York. The Boston Patriots, who did not officially change their name to New England Patriots until after the draft, used the first overall pick to select quarterback Jim Plunkett, the Heisman Trophy winner. It was the first draft where the first three selections were quarterbacks (Plunkett, Archie Manning, and Dan Pastorini).

During round 17, after Falcons coach Norm Van Brocklin had yelled to his staff "Do we want the roughest, toughest s.o.b. in the draft?!", the team drafted the then-64-year-old actor John Wayne, though saying he was from "Fort Apache State" (Wayne actually played football at USC); NFL Commissioner Pete Rozelle rejected the selection.

== Player selections ==
*	= compensatory selection
†	= Pro Bowler
‡	= Hall of Famer

Positions key
Offense	Defense	Special teams
QB — Quarterback; RB — Running back; FB — Fullback; WR — Wide receiver; TE — Tight end; OL — Offensive lineman; T — Tackle; G — Guard; C — Center	DL — Defensive lineman; DT — Defensive tackle (Note: Includes nose tackle (NT)); DE — Defensive end; EDGE — Edge rusher; LB — Linebacker (Note: Includes middle linebacker (MLB/MIKE), weakside linebacker (WILL), strongside linebacker (SAM), off-ball linebacker, and outside linebacker (OLB)); DB — Defensive back; CB — Cornerback; S — Safety (Note: Includes free safety (FS) and strong safety (SS))	K — Kicker (Note: Also known as a placekicker (PK)); P — Punter; LS — Long snapper; RS — Return specialist (Note: Includes kickoff and punt returners)

=== Round 1–10 ===
Rnd.	Pick	Team	Player	Pos.	College	Notes
1	1	Boston Patriots	Jim Plunkett	QB	Stanford	Heisman Trophy winner
1	2	New Orleans Saints	Archie Manning ^{†}	QB	Ole Miss	
1	3	Houston Oilers	Dan Pastorini ^{†}	QB/P	Santa Clara	
1	4	Buffalo Bills	J. D. Hill ^{†}	WR	Arizona State	
1	5	Philadelphia Eagles	Richard Harris	DE	Grambling	
1	6	New York Jets	John Riggins^{‡}^{†}	RB	Kansas	
1	7	Atlanta Falcons	Joe Profit	RB	Northeast Louisiana	
1	8	Pittsburgh Steelers	Frank Lewis ^{†}	WR	Grambling	
1	9	Green Bay Packers	John Brockington ^{†}	RB	Ohio State	from Denver
1	10	Los Angeles Rams	Isiah Robertson ^{†}	LB	Southern	from Washington
1	11	Chicago Bears	Joe Moore	RB	Missouri	
1	12	Denver Broncos	Marv Montgomery	T	USC	from Green Bay
1	13	San Diego Chargers	Leon Burns	RB	Long Beach State	
1	14	Cleveland Browns	Clarence Scott ^{†}	CB	Kansas State	
1	15	Cincinnati Bengals	Vernon Holland	T	Tennessee State	
1	16	Kansas City Chiefs	Elmo Wright	WR	Houston	
1	17	St. Louis Cardinals	Norm Thompson	CB	Utah	
1	18	New York Giants	Rocky Thompson	RB	West Texas A&M	
1	19	Oakland Raiders	Jack Tatum ^{†}	S	Ohio State	
1	20	Los Angeles Rams	Jack Youngblood^{‡}^{†}	DE	Florida	
1	21	Detroit Lions	Bob Bell	DT	Cincinnati	
1	22	Baltimore Colts	Don McCauley	RB	North Carolina	From Miami
1	23	San Francisco 49ers	Tim Anderson	CB	Ohio State	
1	24	Minnesota Vikings	Leo Hayden	RB	Ohio State	
1	25	Dallas Cowboys	Tody Smith	DE	USC	
1	26	Baltimore Colts	Leonard Dunlap	CB	North Texas State	
2	27	Boston Patriots	Julius Adams ^{†}	DT	Texas Southern	
2	28	Chicago Bears	Jim Harrison	RB	Missouri	from New Orleans
2	29	Buffalo Bills	Jan White	TE	Ohio State	
2	30	Detroit Lions	Dave Thompson	C	Clemson	from Philadelphia
2	31	New Orleans Saints	Sam Holden	G	Grambling	from Houston
2	32	New York Jets	John Mooring	T	Tampa	
2	33	Atlanta Falcons	Ken Burrow	WR	San Diego State	
2	34	Pittsburgh Steelers	Jack Ham^{‡}^{†}	LB	Penn State	
2	35	Denver Broncos	Dwight Harrison	WR	Texas A&I	
2	36	Chicago Bears	Charlie Ford	CB	Houston	
2	37	San Francisco 49ers	Ernie Janet	G	Washington	from Green Bay
2	38	Washington Redskins	Cotton Speyrer	WR	Texas	
2	39	Kansas City Chiefs	Wilbur Young	DT	William Penn	from San Diego
2	40	Cleveland Browns	Bo Cornell	RB	Washington	
2	41	Cincinnati Bengals	Stephen Lawson	G	Kansas	
2	42	Kansas City Chiefs	Scott Lewis	DE	Grambling	
2	43	St. Louis Cardinals	Dan Dierdorf^{‡}^{†}	T	Michigan	
2	44	New York Giants	Wayne Walton	T	Abilene Christian	
2	45	Oakland Raiders	Phil Villapiano ^{†}	LB	Bowling Green	
2	46	Green Bay Packers	Virgil Robinson	RB	Grambling	from Los Angeles
2	47	Miami Dolphins	Otto Stowe	WR	Iowa State	
2	48	Detroit Lions	Charlie Weaver	LB	USC	
2	49	San Francisco 49ers	Joe Orduna	RB	Nebraska	
2	50	Philadelphia Eagles	Hank Allison	G	San Diego State	from Minnesota
2	51	Dallas Cowboys	Ike Thomas	CB	Bishop	
2	52	Baltimore Colts	Bill Atessis	DE	Texas	
3	53	Buffalo Bills	Bruce Jarvis	C	Washington	from Boston vis Oakland
3	54	New Orleans Saints	Bivian Lee	CB	Prairie View A&M	
3	55	San Francisco 49ers	Sam Dickerson	WR	USC	from Philadelphia
3	56	Houston Oilers	Lynn Dickey ^{†}	QB	Kansas State	
3	57	Buffalo Bills	Jim Braxton	RB	West Virginia	
3	58	New York Jets	Chris Farasopoulos	S	BYU	
3	59	Atlanta Falcons	Leo Hart	QB	Duke	
3	60	Pittsburgh Steelers	Steve Davis	RB	Delaware State	
3	61	St. Louis Cardinals	James Livesay	WR	Richmond	from Denver
3	62	Green Bay Packers	Charlie Hall	DB	Pittsburgh	
3	63	Los Angeles Rams	Dave Elmendorf	S	Texas A&M	from Washington
3	64	Chicago Bears	Tony McGee	DE	Bishop	
3	65	San Diego Chargers	Mike Montgomery	RB	Kansas State	
3	66	Cleveland Browns	Paul Staroba	WR	Michigan	
3	67	Cincinnati Bengals	Ken Anderson ^{†}	QB	Augustana (IL)	
3	68	Cleveland Browns	Charlie Hall	LB	Houston	from N. Y. Jets
3	69	Dallas Cowboys	Sam Scarber	RB	New Mexico	from St. Louis
3	70	New York Giants	Ronnie Hornsby	LB	Southeastern Louisiana	
3	71	Chicago Bears	Bob Newton	T	Nebraska	from Los Angeles
3	72	Detroit Lions	Al Clark	CB	Eastern Michigan	
3	73	Oakland Raiders	Warren Koegel	C	Penn State	
3	74	Miami Dolphins	Dale Farley	LB	West Virginia	
3	75	San Francisco 49ers	Willie Parker	C	North Texas State	
3	76	Minnesota Vikings	Eddie Hackett	WR	Alcorn A&M	
3	77	Dallas Cowboys	Bill Gregory	DT	Wisconsin	
3	78	Baltimore Colts	Karl Douglas	QB	Texas A&I	
4	79	Denver Broncos	Lyle Alzado ^{†}	DE	Yankton (SD)	from Boston
4	80	Dallas Cowboys	Joe Carter	TE	Grambling	from New Orleans
4	81	Houston Oilers	Larron Jackson	T	Missouri	
4	82	New Orleans Saints	Carlos Bell	RB	Houston	from Buffalo
4	83	Philadelphia Eagles	Happy Feller	K	Texas	
4	84	New York Jets	Bill Zapalac	LB	Texas	
4	85	Atlanta Falcons	Mike Potchad	T	Pittsburg (KS)	
4	86	Pittsburgh Steelers	Gerry Mullins	TE	USC	
4	87	Denver Broncos	Cleo Johnson	DB	Alcorn A&M	
4	88	New Orleans Saints	Wimpy Winther	C	Ole Miss	from Washington
4	89	Chicago Bears	Jerry Morre	S	Arkansas	
4	90	Los Angeles Rams	Steve Worster	RB	Texas	from Green Bay
4	91	New Orleans Saints	D'Artagnan Martin	CB	Kentucky State	from San Diego
4	92	Cleveland Browns	Robert Pena	G	UMass	
4	93	Cincinnati Bengals	Fred Willis	RB	Boston College	
4	94	Kansas City Chiefs	David Robinson	TE	Jacksonville State	
4	95	St. Louis Cardinals	Larry Willingham	DB	Auburn	
4	96	New York Giants	Dave Tipton	DT	Stanford	
4	97	Oakland Raiders	Clarence Davis	RB	USC	
4	98	New Orleans Saints	Don Morrison	T	Texas–Arlington	from Los Angeles
4	99	Miami Dolphins	Joe Theismann ^{†}	QB	Notre Dame	
4	100	Detroit Lions	Larry Woods	DT	Tennessee State	
4	101	San Francisco 49ers	Tony Harris	RB	Toledo	
4	102	Minnesota Vikings	Vince Clements	RB	Connecticut	
4	103	Dallas Cowboys	Adam Mitchell	T	Ole Miss	
4	104	Pittsburgh Steelers	Dwight White ^{†}	DE	East Texas State	from Baltimore
5	105	Boston Patriots	Tim Kelly	LB	Notre Dame	
5	106	Pittsburgh Steelers	Larry Brown ^{†}	TE	Kansas	
5	107	Buffalo Bills	Donnie Green	T	Purdue	
5	108	Philadelphia Eagles	Tom Shellabarger	T	San Diego State	
5	109	Houston Oilers	Willie Armstrong	RB	Grambling	
5	110	Cincinnati Bengals	Art May	DE	Tuskegee	from N. Y. Jets
5	111	Atlanta Falcons	Ray Jarvis	WR	Norfolk State	
5	112	Pittsburgh Steelers	Melvin Holmes	T	North Carolina A&T	
5	113	Buffalo Bills	Tim Beamer	CB	Johnson C. Smith	from Denver
5	114	San Francisco 49ers	Dean Shaternick	T	Kansas State	from Chicago
5	115	San Diego Chargers	Bryant Salter	S	Pittsburgh	from Green Bay
5	116	Green Bay Packers	Donnell Smith	DE	Southern	from Washington
5	117	San Diego Chargers	Ray White	LB	Syracuse	
5	118	Cleveland Browns	Stan Brown	WR	Purdue	
5	119	San Diego Chargers	Phil Asack	DE	Duke	from Cincinnati
5	120	Kansas City Chiefs	Mike Adamle	RB	Northwestern	
5	121	St. Louis Cardinals	Rocky Wallace	LB	Missouri	
5	122	San Francisco 49ers	George Wells	LB	New Mexico State	from N. Y. Giants
5	123	Oakland Raiders	Bob Moore	TE	Stanford	
5	124	Green Bay Packers	Jim Stillwagon	LB	Ohio State	from Los Angeles via Washington
5	125	Detroit Lions	Pete Newell	G	Michigan	
5	126	Pittsburgh Steelers	Ralph Anderson	DB	West Texas A&M	
5	127	San Francisco 49ers	Marty Huff	LB	Michigan	
5	128	Pittsburgh Steelers	Fred Brister	LB	Ole Miss	from Minnesota
5	129	Dallas Cowboys	Ron Kadziel	LB	Stanford	
5	130	Baltimore Colts	John Andrews	TE	Indiana	
6	131	Boston Patriots	David Hardt	TE	Kentucky	
6	132	New Orleans Saints	Don Moorhead	RB	Michigan	
6	133	Philadelphia Eagles	Jack Smith	DB	Troy State	
6	134	Houston Oilers	Willie Alexander	CB	Alcorn A&M	
6	135	Chicago Bears	Earl Thomas	WR	Houston	from Buffalo
6	136	New York Jets	Phil Wise	TE	Nebraska–Omaha	
6	137	Atlanta Falcons	Tom Hayes	CB	San Diego State	
6	138	Pittsburgh Steelers	Craig Hanneman	T	Oregon State	
6	139	Denver Broncos	Harold Phillips	DB	Michigan State	
6	140	Green Bay Packers	Scott Hunter	QB	Alabama	
6	141	Washington Redskins	Conway Hayman	G	Delaware	
6	142	Cleveland Browns	Doug Dieken ^{†}	T	Illinois	from Chicago
6	143	San Diego Chargers	Jacob Mayes	RB	Tennessee State	
6	144	Cleveland Browns	Jay Dixon	DE	Boston University	
6	145	Buffalo Bills	Bill McKinley	DE	Arizona	from Cincinnati
6	146	Kansas City Chiefs	Kerry Reardon	CB	Iowa	
6	147	St. Louis Cardinals	Mel Gray ^{†}	WR	Missouri	
6	148	Atlanta Falcons	Ray Brown	S	West Texas State	from N. Y. Giants
6	149	Oakland Raiders	Greg Slough	LB	USC	
6	150	Detroit Lions	Frank Harris	QB	Boston College	from Los Angeles via Philadelphia
6	151	Miami Dolphins	Dennis Coleman	LB	Ole Miss	
6	152	Detroit Lions	Herman Franklin	WR	USC	
6	153	San Francisco 49ers	Al Bresler	WR	Auburn	
6	154	Philadelphia Eagles	Wyck Neely	DB	Ole Miss	from Minnesota
6	155	Dallas Cowboys	Steve Maier	WR	Northern Arizona	
6	156	Baltimore Colts	Ken Frith	DT	Northeast Louisiana	
7	157	Oakland Raiders	Don Martin	DB	Yale	from Boston
7	158	New Orleans Saints	Larry DiNardo	G	Notre Dame	
7	159	Houston Oilers	Phil Croyle	LB	California	
7	160	Buffalo Bills	Bob Chandler	WR	USC	
7	161	Philadelphia Eagles	Harold Carmichael^{‡}^{†}	WR	Southern	
7	162	New York Jets	Scott Palmer	DT	Texas	
7	163	Atlanta Falcons	Wesley Chesson	WR	Duke	
7	164	Pittsburgh Steelers	Worthy McClure	T	Ole Miss	
7	165	Denver Broncos	Doug Adams	LB	Ohio State	
7	166	Washington Redskins	Willie Germany	DB	Morgan State	
7	167	Chicago Bears	Buddy Lee	QB	LSU	
7	168	Green Bay Packers	Dave Davis	WR	Tennessee State	
7	169	San Diego Chargers	Chuck Dicus	WR	Arkansas	
7	170	Cleveland Browns	Bob Jacobs	K	Wyoming	
7	171	Cincinnati Bengals	Neal Craig	S	Fisk	
7	172	New Orleans Saints	Bob Newland	WR	Oregon	from Kansas City
7	173	St. Louis Cardinals	James Cooch	DB	Colorado	
7	174	Houston Oilers	Larry Watson	T	Morgan State	from N. Y. Giants
7	175	Green Bay Packers	James Johnson	WR	Bishop	from Oakland
7	176	Chicago Bears	Dennis Ferris	RB	Pittsburgh	from Los Angeles
7	177	Detroit Lions	Brownie Wheless	T	Rice	
7	178	Miami Dolphins	Ron Dickerson	DB	Kansas State	
7	179	San Francisco 49ers	John Watson	T	Oklahoma	
7	180	Minnesota Vikings	Gene Mack	LB	UTEP	
7	181	Dallas Cowboys	Bill Griffin	T	Catawba	
7	182	Baltimore Colts	Gordon Bowdell	WR	Michigan State	
8	183	Buffalo Bills	Louis Ross	DE	South Carolina State	from Boston
8	184	Pittsburgh Steelers	Larry Crowe	RB	Texas Southern	from New Orleans
8	185	Buffalo Bills	Tyrone Walls	RB	Missouri	
8	186	Philadelphia Eagles	Leonard Gotschalk	C	Humboldt State	
8	187	Denver Broncos	Tom Beard	C	Michigan State	from Houston
8	188	New York Jets	Roy Kirksey	G	Maryland State	
8	189	Atlanta Falcons	Dennis Havig	G	Colorado	
8	190	Pittsburgh Steelers	Paul Rogers	K	Nebraska	
8	191	Kansas City Chiefs	Mike Sensibaugh	S	Ohio State	from Denver
8	192	Chicago Bears	Karl Weiss	T	Vanderbilt	
8	193	Green Bay Packers	Win Headley	C	Wake Forest	
8	194	New Orleans Saints	James Elder	DB	Southern	from Washington
8	195	San Diego Chargers	Leon Van Gorkum	DE	San Diego State	
8	196	Cleveland Browns	Larry Zelina	RB	Ohio State	
8	197	Cincinnati Bengals	Fred Herring	DB	Tennessee State	
8	198	Kansas City Chiefs	Rick Telander	DB	Northwestern	
8	199	St. Louis Cardinals	Ron Yankowski	DE	Kansas State	
8	200	New York Giants	Ted Gregory	DE	Delaware	
8	201	New Orleans Saints	Bob Gresham	RB	West Virginia	from Oakland
8	202	Los Angeles Rams	Tony Garay	DE	Hofstra	
8	203	Pittsburgh Steelers	Ernie Holmes	DT	Texas Southern	from Miami
8	204	Detroit Lions	Ken Lee	LB	Washington	
8	205	San Francisco 49ers	Jim McCann	P	Arizona State	
8	206	Dallas Cowboys	Ron Jessie ^{†}	WR	Kansas	
8	207	Baltimore Colts	Willie Bogan	DB	Dartmouth	
8	208	Minnesota Vikings	John Fairley	DE	Johnson C. Smith	
9	209	Boston Patriots	Josh Ashton	RB	Tulsa	
9	210	New Orleans Saints	Tom Williams	DB	Willamette	
9	211	Philadelphia Eagles	Len Pettigrew	LB	Ashland	
9	212	Houston Oilers	Floyd Rice	LB	Alcorn A&M	
9	213	Buffalo Bills	Bob Strickland	LB	Auburn	
9	214	New York Jets	John Curtis	TE	Springfield	
9	215	Atlanta Falcons	Alvin Griffin	WR	Tuskegee	
9	216	Pittsburgh Steelers	Mike Anderson	LB	LSU	
9	217	Denver Broncos	John Handy	LB	Purdue	
9	218	Green Bay Packers	Barry Mayer	RB	Minnesota	
9	219	Washington Redskins	Mike Fanucci	DE	Arizona State	
9	220	Chicago Bears	Lester McClain	WR	Tennessee	
9	221	San Diego Chargers	John Tanner	TE	Tennessee Tech	
9	222	Cleveland Browns	Wilmur Levels	DB	North Texas State	
9	223	Cincinnati Bengals	Gary Gustafson	LB	Montana State	
9	224	Kansas City Chiefs	Alvin Hawes	T	Minnesota	
9	225	St. Louis Cardinals	Mike Savoy	WR	Black Hills (SD)	
9	226	New York Giants	Ed Thomas	LB	Lebanon Valley	
9	227	Oakland Raiders	Dave Garnett	RB	Pittsburgh	
9	228	Los Angeles Rams	Joe Schmidt	WR	Miami (FL)	
9	229	Detroit Lions	Mickey Zofko	RB	Auburn	
9	230	Miami Dolphins	Vern Den Herder ^{†}	DE	Central Iowa	
9	231	San Francisco 49ers	Therman Couch	LB	Iowa State	
9	232	Minnesota Vikings	Tim Sullivan	RB	Iowa	
9	233	Dallas Cowboys	Honor Jackson	WR	Pacific	
9	234	Baltimore Colts	Bill Burnett	RB	Arkansas	
10	235	Boston Patriots	Layne McDowell	T	Iowa	
10	236	San Francisco 49ers	Ron Cardo	RB	Wisconsin–Oshkosh	from New Orleans
10	237	Houston Oilers	Russell Price	DE	North Carolina Central	
10	238	Oakland Raiders	William West	DB	Tennessee State	from Buffalo
10	239	New Orleans Saints	Rocky Pamplin	RB	Hawaii	from Philadelphia
10	240	New York Jets	Jim Betts	DB	Michigan	
10	241	Atlanta Falcons	Faddie Tillman	DE	Boise State	
10	242	Pittsburgh Steelers	Jim O'Shea	TE	Boston College	
10	243	Denver Broncos	Carlis Harris	WR	Idaho State	
10	244	Washington Redskins	Jesse Taylor	RB	Cincinnati	
10	245	Chicago Bears	Larry Rowden	LB	Houston	
10	246	Green Bay Packers	Kevin Hunt	T	Doane	
10	247	San Diego Chargers	Gary Nowak	TE	Michigan State	
10	248	Cleveland Browns	Steve Casteel	LB	Oklahoma	
10	249	Cincinnati Bengals	Jack Stambaugh	G	Oregon	
10	250	Kansas City Chiefs	Bruce Jankowski	WR	Ohio State	
10	251	St. Louis Cardinals	Ronald Miller	T	McNeese State	
10	252	New York Giants	Henry Reed	LB	Weber State	
10	253	Oakland Raiders	Tim Oesterling	DT	UCLA	
10	254	Los Angeles Rams	Don Popplewell	C	Colorado	
10	255	Miami Dolphins	Ron Maree	DT	Purdue	
10	256	Philadelphia Eagles	Tom Bailey	RB	Florida State	from Detroit
10	257	San Francisco 49ers	Ernie Jennings	WR	Air Force	
10	258	Minnesota Vikings	Chris Morris	G	Indiana	
10	259	Dallas Cowboys	Rodney Wallace	DT	New Mexico	
10	260	Baltimore Colts	Rex Kern	QB	Ohio State	

=== Round 11 ===
Pick #	NFL team	Player	Position	College
261	Boston Patriots	Dan Schneiss	Tight end	Nebraska
262	New Orleans Saints	Bob Pollard	Defensive end	Weber State
263	Buffalo Bills	Andy Browder	Tackle	Texas A&I
264	Philadelphia Eagles	Albert Davis	Running back	Tennessee State
265	Houston Oilers	Macon Hughes	Wide receiver	Rice
266	New York Jets	Vernon Studdard	Wide receiver	Mississippi
267	Atlanta Falcons	Larry Shears	Defensive back	Lincoln (MO)
268	Pittsburgh Steelers	Mike Wagner	Defensive back	Western Illinois
269	Denver Broncos	Roger Roitsch	Defensive tackle	Rice
270	Chicago Bears	Cliff Hardy	Defensive back	Michigan State
271	Green Bay Packers	John Lanier	Running back	Parsons
272	Washington Redskins	George Starke	Tackle	Columbia
273	San Diego Chargers	Don Pinson	Defensive back	Tennessee State
274	Cleveland Browns	Mike Sikich	Guard	Northwestern
275	Cincinnati Bengals	Edward Marshall	Wide receiver	Cameron State
276	Kansas City Chiefs	Nate Allen	Defensive back	Texas Southern
277	St. Louis Cardinals	Rick Ogle	Linebacker	Colorado
278	New York Giants	Marshall Ellison	Guard	Dayton
279	Oakland Raiders	Jim Poston	Defensive tackle	South Carolina
280	Los Angeles Rams	Charlie Richards	Quarterback	Richmond
281	Detroit Lions	Phil Webb	Defensive back	Colorado State
282	Miami Dolphins	Vic Surma	Tackle	Penn State
283	San Francisco 49ers	Joe Reed	Quarterback	Mississippi State
284	Minnesota Vikings	Mike Walker	Linebacker	Tulane
285	Dallas Cowboys	Ernest Bonwell	Defensive tackle	Lane (Tenn.)
286	Baltimore Colts	Dave Jones	Linebacker	Baylor

=== Round 12 ===
Pick #	NFL team	Player	Position	College
287	Boston Patriots	John Rodman	Tackle	Northwestern
288	New Orleans Saints	Ron Gathright	Defensive back	Morehead State
289	Philadelphia Eagles	Rich Saathoff	Defensive end	Northern Arizona
290	Houston Oilers	John Thompson	Guard	Minnesota
291	Buffalo Bills	Jim Sheffield	Kicker	Texas A&M
292	New York Jets	Rich Sowells	Defensive back	Alcorn A&M
293	Atlanta Falcons	Ronnie Lowe	Wide receiver	Ft. Valley State
294	Baltimore Colts	Bob Wuensch	Tackle	Texas
295	Denver Broncos	Floyd Franks	Wide receiver	Mississippi
296	Green Bay Packers	Greg Hendren	Guard	California
297	Washington Redskins	Jeff Severson	Defensive back	Cal State-Long Beach
298	Chicago Bears	Steve Booras	Defensive end	Mesa Jr. College
299	San Diego Chargers	Wesley Garnett	Wide receiver	Utah State
300	Cleveland Browns	Tony Blanchard	Tight end	North Carolina
301	Cincinnati Bengals	James Hayden	Defensive end	Memphis State
302	Kansas City Chiefs	Tony Esposito	Running back	Pittsburgh
303	St. Louis Cardinals	Tim Von Dulm	Quarterback	Portland State
304	New York Giants	Tom Blanchard	Kicker	Oregon
305	Oakland Raiders	Horace Jones	Defensive tackle	Louisville
306	Los Angeles Rams	Kirk Behrendt	Tackle	Whitewater
307	Miami Dolphins	Leroy Byars	Running back	Alcorn A&M
308	Detroit Lions	Bill Pilconis	Wide receiver	Pittsburgh
309	San Francisco 49ers	Jim Bunch	Defensive tackle	Wisconsin–Platteville
310	Minnesota Vikings	Reggie Holmes	Defensive back	Wisconsin–Stout
311	Dallas Cowboys	Steve Goepel	Quarterback	Colgate
312	Baltimore Colts	Bill Triplett	Wide receiver	Michigan State

=== Round 13 ===
Pick #	NFL team	Player	Position	College
313	Boston Patriots	Lewis Swain	Defensive back	Alabama A&M
314	New Orleans Saints	Don Burchfield	Tight end	Ball State
315	Houston Oilers	Joe Hoing	Guard	Arkansas Tech
316	Buffalo Bills	Busty Underwood	Quarterback	Texas Christian
317	Philadelphia Eagles	Danny Lester	Defensive back	Texas
318	New York Jets	John Eggold	Defensive end	Arizona
319	Atlanta Falcons	Dan Crooks	Defensive back	Wisconsin
320	Pittsburgh Steelers	Alfred Young	Wide receiver	South Carolina State
321	Denver Broncos	Craig Blackford	Quarterback	Evansville
322	Washington Redskins	Dan Ryczek	Center	Virginia
323	Chicago Bears	Ed Nicholas	Tackle	North Carolina State
324	Green Bay Packers	Jack Martin	Running back	Angelo State
325	San Diego Chargers	Sammy Milner	Wide receiver	Mississippi State
326	Cleveland Browns	Thad Jamula	Tackle	Lehigh
327	Cincinnati Bengals	David Knapman	Tight end	Central Washington
328	Kansas City Chiefs	Chuck Hixson	Quarterback	Southern Methodist
329	St. Louis Cardinals	Jeff Allen	Defensive back	Iowa State
330	New York Giants	Dave Roller	Defensive tackle	Kentucky
331	Los Angeles Rams	Russell Harrison	Running back	Kansas State
332	Detroit Lions	David Abercrombie	Running back	Tulane
333	Miami Dolphins	Lionel Hepburn	Defensive back	Texas Southern
334	Oakland Raiders	Mick Natzel	Defensive back	Central Michigan
335	San Francisco 49ers	John Bullock	Running back	Purdue
336	Minnesota Vikings	Benny Fry	Center	Houston
337	Dallas Cowboys	James Ford	Running back	Texas Southern
338	Baltimore Colts	Tom Neville	Linebacker	Yale

=== Round 14 ===
Pick #	NFL team	Player	Position	College
339	Boston Patriots	Alfred Sykes	Wide receiver	Florida A&M
340	New Orleans Saints	Bobby Scott	Quarterback	Tennessee
341	Buffalo Bills	Jim Hoots	Defensive end	Missouri Southern
342	Philadelphia Eagles	Robert Creech	Linebacker	Texas Christian
343	Houston Oilers	Dick Adams	Defensive back	Miami (OH)
344	New York Jets	John Harpring	Guard	Michigan
345	Atlanta Falcons	Daryl Comer	Tight end	Texas
346	Pittsburgh Steelers	McKinney Evans	Defensive back	New Mexico Highlands
347	Chicago Bears	Willie Lewis	Running back	Arizona
348	Green Bay Packers	LeRoy Spears	Defensive end	Moorhead (MN)
349	Washington Redskins	Bill Bynum	Quarterback	W. New Mexico
350	Denver Broncos	Tommy Lyons	Center	Georgia
351	San Diego Chargers	Edward O'Daniel	Defensive end	Texas Southern
352	Cleveland Browns	Rick Kingrea	Linebacker	Tulane
353	Cincinnati Bengals	Irvin Mallory	Defensive back	Virginia Union
354	Kansas City Chiefs	Bruce Bergey	Defensive end	UCLA
355	St. Louis Cardinals	Doug Klausen	Tackle	Arizona
356	New York Giants	Charlie Evans	Running back	USC
357	Oakland Raiders	Tom Gipson	Defensive tackle	North Texas State
358	Los Angeles Rams	Lionel Coleman	Defensive back	Oregon
359	Miami Dolphins	David Vaughn	Tight end	Memphis State
360	Detroit Lions	Tom Lorenz	Tight end	Iowa State
361	San Francisco 49ers	Bill Dunstan	Defensive end	Utah State
362	Minnesota Vikings	Jim Gallagher	Linebacker	Yale
363	Dallas Cowboys	Tyrone Covey	Defensive back	Utah State
364	Baltimore Colts	Mike Mikolayunas	Running back	Davidson

=== Round 15 ===
Pick #	NFL team	Player	Position	College
365	Boston Patriots	Nick McGarry	Tight end	Massachusetts
366	New Orleans Saints	Bart Graves	Tackle	Tulane
367	Philadelphia Eagles	Ed Fisher	Guard	Prairie View A&M
368	Houston Oilers	Andy Hopkins	Running back	Stephen F. Austin
369	Buffalo Bills	Charles Cole	Running back	Toledo
370	New York Jets	Dan Dyches	Center	South Carolina
371	Atlanta Falcons	Wallace Clark	Running back	Auburn
372	Pittsburgh Steelers	Ray Makin	Guard	Kentucky
373	Denver Broncos	Larry James	Running back	Norfolk State
374	Green Bay Packers	Len Garrett	Tight end	New Mexico Highlands
375	Washington Redskins	Anthony Christnovich	Guard	LaCrosse (Wisc)
376	Chicago Bears	Ron Maciejowski	Quarterback	Ohio State
377	San Diego Chargers	Eric Humston	Linebacker	Muskingum
378	Cleveland Browns	Bill Green	Defensive back	Western Kentucky
379	Cincinnati Bengals	Bob Thomas	Running back	Arizona State
380	Kansas City Chiefs	Mike Montgomery	Defensive back	Southwest Texas State
381	St. Louis Cardinals	Ted Heiskell	Running back	Houston
382	New York Giants	Jim Wright	Linebacker	Notre Dame
383	Oakland Raiders	Andy Giles	Defensive end	William & Mary
384	Los Angeles Rams	Vontez Norman VI	Guard	Notre Dame
385	Detroit Lions	Ed Coates	Wide receiver	Central Missouri
386	Miami Dolphins	Bob Richards	Guard	California
387	San Francisco 49ers	John Lennon	Tackle	Colgate
388	Minnesota Vikings	Jeff Wright	Defensive back	Minnesota
389	Dallas Cowboys	Bob Young	Tight end	Delaware
390	Baltimore Colts	Mike Hogan	Linebacker	Michigan State

=== Round 16 ===
Rnd.	Pick	Team	Player	Pos.	College	Notes
16	391	Boston Patriots	Jim Zikmund	DB	Kearney State	
16	392	New Orleans Saints	Craig Robinson	T	Houston	
16	393	Houston Oilers	Mose Denson	RB	Maryland State	
16	394	Buffalo Bills	Billy Hunter	DB	Utah	
16	395	Philadelphia Eagles	Bruce James	LB	Arkansas	
16	396	New York Jets	Steve Harkey	RB	Georgia Tech	
16	397	Atlanta Falcons	Lindsey James	RB	San Diego State	
16	398	Pittsburgh Steelers	Walter Huntley	DB	Trinity (TX)	
16	399	Denver Broncos	Steve Thompson	DT	Minnesota	
16	400	Washington Redskins	Glenn Tucker	LB	North Texas State	
16	401	Chicago Bears	Sid Bailey	DE	Texas–Arlington	
16	402	Green Bay Packers	Jack O'Donnell	G	Central State (OK)	
16	403	San Diego Chargers	Ed Foote	C	Hawaii	
16	404	Cleveland Browns	Dave Smith	WR	Mississippi State	
16	405	Cincinnati Bengals	Mark Debevc	LB	Ohio State	
16	406	Kansas City Chiefs	Darrell Jansonius	G	Iowa State	
16	407	St. Louis Cardinals	Lawrence Brame	LB	Western Kentucky	
16	408	New York Giants	Dick Gibbs	TE	UTEP	
16	409	Los Angeles Rams	Ross Boice	LB	Pacific Lutheran	
16	410	Miami Dolphins	Chris Myers	WR	Kenyon	
16	411	Detroit Lions	Tom Kutchinski	DB	Michigan State	
16	412	Oakland Raiders	Tony Stawarz	DB	Miami (FL)	
16	413	Minnesota Vikings	Greg Edmonds	WR	Penn State	
16	414	San Francisco 49ers	Dave Purcell	DT	Kentucky	
16	415	Dallas Cowboys	John Brennan	T	Boston College	
16	416	Baltimore Colts	Rich Harrington	DB	Houston	

=== Round 17 ===
Pick #	NFL team	Player	Position	College
417	Boston Patriots	Ronald Leigh	Defensive end	Elizabeth City State
418	Los Angeles Rams	Randy Vataha	Wide receiver	Stanford
419	Buffalo Bills	Pat Morrison	Tight end	Arkansas
420	Philadelphia Eagles	John Sage	Linebacker	LSU
421	Houston Oilers	Calvin Fox	Linebacker	Michigan State
422	New York Jets	Greg Flaska	Defensive end	Western Michigan
423	Atlanta Falcons	Willie Martin	Running back	Johnson C. Smith
424	Pittsburgh Steelers	Danny Ehle	Running back	Howard Payne
425	Denver Broncos	Jack Simcsak	Kicker	Virginia Tech
426	Chicago Bears	Ray Garganes	Linebacker	Millersville (PA)
427	Green Bay Packers	Monty Johnson	Defensive back	Oklahoma
428	New Orleans Saints	Hermann Eben	Wide receiver	Oklahoma State
429	San Diego Chargers	Chip Kell	Center	Tennessee
430	Cleveland Browns	Leo Dillon	Center	Dayton
431	Kansas City Chiefs	Travis Hill	Defensive back	Prairie View A&M
432	Cincinnati Bengals	Sam Pearson	Defensive back	Western Kentucky
433	St. Louis Cardinals	Preston Watkins	Wide receiver	Bluefield (WV)
434	New York Giants	Coleman Zeno	Wide receiver	Grambling
435	Los Angeles Rams	Joe Sweet	Wide receiver	Tennessee State
436	Detroit Lions	Gordon Jolley	Tackle	Utah
437	Miami Dolphins	Curt Mark	Linebacker	Mayville (N.D.)
438	San Francisco 49ers	Leroy Charlton	Defensive back	Florida A&M
439	Minnesota Vikings	Ken Duncan	Punter	Tulsa
440	Dallas Cowboys	John Bomer	Center	Memphis State
441	Baltimore Colts	Don Nottingham	Running back	Kent State
442	Oakland Raiders	Charles Hill	Wide receiver	Sam Houston State

== Notable undrafted players ==
^{†}	= Pro Bowler

Original NFL team	Player	Pos.	College	Notes
Atlanta Falcons	Jim Miller	G	Iowa	
Buffalo Bills	Tony Greene ^{†}	S	Maryland	
Buffalo Bills	John Leypoldt	K	Northern Virginia	
Cincinnati Bengals	Tony Bertuca	LB	Chico State	
Cincinnati Bengals	Cookie Brinkman	WR	Louisville	
Dallas Cowboys	Toni Fritsch ^{†}	K		
Green Bay Packers	Jim DeLisle	DT	Wisconsin	
Green Bay Packers	Tim Webster	K	Arkansas	
Houston Oilers	Ward Walsh	RB	Colorado	
Los Angeles Rams	Matt Maslowski	WR	San Diego	
Los Angeles Rams	Dave Mays	QB	Texas Southern	
Miami Dolphins	Maulty Moore	DT	Bethune-Cookman	
Minnesota Vikings	Chuck Winfrey	LB	Wisconsin	
New England Patriots	Kenny Price	LB	Iowa	
New Orleans Saints	Bill Line	DT	SMU	
New York Giants	Dick Hanson	T	North Dakota State	
Oakland Raiders	Don Milan	QB	Cal Poly	
Pittsburgh Steelers	Glen Edwards ^{†}	S	Florida A&M	
St. Louis Cardinals	George Jakowenko	K	Syracuse	

== Hall of Famers ==
- Jack Ham, linebacker from Pennsylvania State, taken 2nd round 34th overall by Pittsburgh Steelers

Inducted: Professional Football Hall of Fame class of 1988.

- John Riggins, running back from Kansas, taken 1st round 6th overall by New York Jets

Inducted: Professional Football Hall of Fame class of 1992.

- Dan Dierdorf, offensive tackle from Michigan, taken 2nd round 43rd overall by St. Louis Cardinals

Inducted: Professional Football Hall of Fame class of 1996.

- Jack Youngblood, defensive end from Florida, taken 1st round 20th overall by Los Angeles Rams

Inducted: Professional Football Hall of Fame class of 2001.

- Harold Carmichael, wide receiver from Southern, taken 7th round 161st overall by Philadelphia Eagles

Inducted: Professional Football Hall of Fame class of 2020
