= 1971 New York Giants season =

NFL team season

- Owner: Wellington Mara
- Head coach: Alex Webster
- Home stadium: Yankee Stadium

Results
- Record: 4–10
- Division place: 5th NFC East
- Playoffs: Did not qualify
- Pro Bowlers: None

The 1971 New York Giants season was the franchise's 47th season in the National Football League (NFL). The Giants had a 4–10 record for the season and finished in last place in the National Football Conference East Division.

The Giants selected Rocky Thompson in the 1971 NFL draft, with the 18th overall pick. After a winless preseason, New York began the regular season with a 2–1 record before posting a 2–9 mark in its final eleven games. The team was affected by numerous injuries, including a thigh injury suffered by running back Ron Johnson, who had gained more than 1,000 rushing yards in 1970. The 1971 season was the last for quarterback Fran Tarkenton with the Giants; after he requested a trade, the Giants dealt him to the Minnesota Vikings in 1972 for three players and a pair of draft picks.

== Roster ==
1971 New York Giants roster
Quarterbacks (QB): 19 Ed Baker; 11 Randy Johnson; 10 Fran Tarkenton; Running backs (RB): 34 Junior Coffey; 28 Bobby Duhon; 31 Charlie Evans; 24 Tucker Frederickson; 30 Ron Johnson; 40 Joe Morrison; 22 Rocky Thompson; Wide receivers (WR): 85 Don Herrmann; 84 Rich Houston; 88 Coleman Zeno; Tight ends (TE): 87 Rich Kotite; 38 Bob Tucker	Offensive linemen (OL): 60 Steve Alexakos G; 77 Dick Hanson T; 61 Charlie Harper T; 70 Bob Hyland G; 53 Greg Larson C; 63 Doug Van Horn G; 78 Wayne Walton G; 69 Willie Young T; Defensive linemen (DL): 89 Fred Dryer DE; 73 Jim Kanicki DT; 70 Roland Lakes DT; 80 Henry Reed DE; 74 Dave Roller DT; 75 Jerry Shay DT; 71 Dave Tipton DE; 79 Vernon Vanoy DT	Linebackers (LB): 51 John Douglas OLB; 58 Jim Files OLB; 55 Ralph Heck OLB; 67 Ron Hornsby MLB; 56 Pat Hughes OLB; Defensive backs (DB): 45 Pete Athas CB; 21 Otto Brown CB; 20 Scott Eaton FS; 44 Richmond Flowers SS; 33 Joe Green FS; 43 Spider Lockhart SS; 26 Bennie McRae CB; 41 Willie Williams CB; Special teams (ST): 15 Tom Blanchard P; 83 Skip Butler K; 3 Pete Gogolak K	Rookies in italics

== Schedule ==
Week	Date	Opponent	Result	Record	Attendance
1	September 19	at Green Bay Packers	**W** 42–40	1–0	56,263
2	September 26	**Washington Redskins**	**L** 3–30	1–1	62,795
3	October 3	at **St. Louis Cardinals**	**W** 21–20	2–1	49,571
4	October 11	at **Dallas Cowboys**	**L** 13–20	2–2	68,378
5	October 17	Baltimore Colts	**L** 7–31	2–3	62,860
6	October 24	at **Philadelphia Eagles**	**L** 7–23	2–4	65,358
7	October 31	Minnesota Vikings	**L** 10–17	2–5	62,829
8	November 7	San Diego Chargers	**W** 35–17	3–5	62,905
9	November 14	at Atlanta Falcons	**W** 21–17	4–5	58,850
10	November 21	at Pittsburgh Steelers	**L** 13–17	4–6	50,008
11	November 28	**St. Louis Cardinals**	**L** 7–24	4–7	62,878
12	December 5	at **Washington Redskins**	**L** 7–23	4–8	53,401
13	December 12	**Dallas Cowboys**	**L** 14–42	4–9	62,815
14	December 19	**Philadelphia Eagles**	**L** 28–41	4–10	62,774

Note: Intra-division opponents are in bold text.

=== Standings ===
NFC East
	W	L	T	PCT	DIV	CONF	PF	PA	STK
Dallas Cowboys	11	3	0	.786	7–1	8–3	406	222	W7
Washington Redskins	9	4	1	.692	6–1–1	8–2–1	276	190	L1
Philadelphia Eagles	6	7	1	.462	4–3–1	5–5–1	221	302	W3
St. Louis Cardinals	4	9	1	.308	1–7	2–8–1	231	279	L2
New York Giants	4	10	0	.286	1–7	3–8	228	362	L5

Note: Tie games were not officially counted in the standings until 1972.
