= 1971 Los Angeles Rams season =

NFL team 34th season

- Owner: estate of Dan Reeves
- Head coach: Tommy Prothro
- Home stadium: Los Angeles Memorial Coliseum

Results
- Record: 8–5–1
- Division place: 2nd NFC West
- Playoffs: Did not qualify

The 1971 Los Angeles Rams season was the team's 34th year with the National Football League, and the 26th season in Los Angeles. The team looked to improve on its 9–4–1 record from 1970, but finished only one game below their goal, as they finished 8–5–1 and finished 2nd in the NFC West, behind the San Francisco 49ers (9–5).

The Rams started out strong at 4–1–1, but split their final eight games. Despite sweeping the 49ers on the season, a crucial tie against the Atlanta Falcons in week 2 (not to mention a loss at last-place New Orleans on opening day, the Saints' first defeat of the Rams) proved to doom the Rams, because had they beaten Atlanta, they would've clinched the NFC West by virtue of their sweep over the 49ers (the tie would have been moot had they not yielded a touchdown to Saints rookie quarterback Archie Manning on the final play of the opener).

Team owner Dan Reeves died of cancer prior to the season in April.

== NFL draft ==
| = Made roster |
| = Pro Bowler |

1971 Los Angeles Rams Draft
| Round | Selection | Player | Position | College |
|---|---|---|---|---|
| 1 | 10 | Isiah Robertson | Linebacker | Southern |
| 1 | 20 | Jack Youngblood | Defensive end | Florida |
| 3 | 63 | Dave Elmendorf | Strong safety | Texas A&M |
| 4 | 101 | Steve Worster | Running back | Texas |
| 8 | 202 | Tony Garay | Defensive end | Hofstra |
| 9 | 228 | Joe Schmidt | Wide receiver | Miami (FL) |
| 10 | 254 | Don Popplewell | Center | Colorado |
| 11 | 280 | Charlie Richards | Quarterback | Richmond |
| 12 | 306 | Kirk Behrendt | Tackle | Whitewater |
| 13 | 331 | Russell Harrison | Running back | Kansas State |
| 14 | 358 | Lionel Coleman | Defensive back | Oregon |
| 15 | 384 | Vontez Norman VI | Guard | Notre Dame |
| 16 | 409 | Ross Boice | Linebacker | Pacific Lutheran |
| 17 | 418 | Randy Vataha | Wide receiver | Stanford |
| 17 | 435 | Joe Sweet | Wide receiver | Tennessee State |

== Personnel ==
=== Staff / Coaches ===
1971 Los Angeles Rams staff
| Front Office: Owner – estate of Dan Reeves; President / General Manager – Bill Barnes _{(Presided over estate of Dan Reeves until buyer could be found for franchise)}; Coaching Staff: Head coach / Offensive Coordinator - Tommy Prothro; Offensive Coaches: Quarterbacks Coach - Dick Vermeil; Offensive Backfield Coach - Earnel Durden; Offensive Line - Bobb McKittrick | Defensive Coaches: Linebackers - Tom Catlin; Defensive Backs Coach - Larrye Weaver; Special Teams Coaches: Special Teams Assistant – Rich Brooks; Strength and Conditioning: None - N/A; Other Assistant Coaches: Garrett Giemont - Training Assistant; College / Pro Scott - Jack Faulkner |

=== Final roster ===
1971 Los Angeles Rams roster
| Quarterbacks (QB): 18 Roman Gabriel; 17 Jerry Rhome; Running backs (RB): 33 Willie Ellison; 34 Les Josephson; 36 Larry Smith; 44 Lee White; 25 Travis Williams; Wide receivers (WR): 48 Matt Maslowski; 13 Lance Rentzel; 84 Jack Snow; Tight ends (TE): 88 Pat Curran; 80 Bob Klein | Offensive linemen (OL): 63 Joe Carollo T; 73 Charley Cowan T; 50 Ken Iman C; 68 Mike LaHood G; 65 Tom Mack G; 61 Rich Saul C; 76 Harry Schuh T; 71 Joe Scibelli G; Defensive linemen (DL): 79 Coy Bacon DE; 75 Deacon Jones DE; 74 Merlin Olsen DT; 72 Phil Olsen DT; 78 Greg Wojcik DT; 85 Jack Youngblood DE | Linebackers (LB): 36 Ken Geddes OLB; 56 Dean Halverson OLB; 86 Marlin McKeever MLB; 52 John Pergine OLB; 53 Jim Purnell OLB; 58 Isiah Robertson OLB; Defensive backs (DB): 39 Kermit Alexander SS; 42 Dave Elmendorf FS; 20 Gene Howard CB; 19 Jim Nettles CB; 24 Clancy Williams CB; 46 Roger Williams FS; Special teams (ST): 27 David Ray K; 28 Pat Studstill P | Practice squad: 77 Rich Buzin T; 47 Larry Crowe CB; 81 Tim Oesterling DT; 29 Joe Sweet WR; 11 John Walton QB; Reserve: 89 Rick Cash DE (IR); -- Russell Harrison RB (IR); 23 Alvin Haymond S (IR); 67 Bill Nelson DT (IR); 57 Don Parish LB (IR); 64 Jack Reynolds LB; -- Edgar Scott RB (IR); 35 Bob Thomas RB (IR); -- Jim Wilson T (IR); -- Doug Woodlief LB Retired; Rookies in italics |

== Regular season ==
As they had in 1970, the Rams and 49ers staged a season long battle for the NFC West title that came down to the season's final game. The Rams season got off to a rocky and controversial start in New Orleans against the Saints and their rookie quarterback Archie Manning. The Saints trailed 20–17 in the final seconds and faced 4th and goal from the Rams' 1-yard line. Instead of settling for a tie (there was no overtime for regular season games in the NFL in 1971), the Saints gambled and went for the win. Manning ran a quarterback sneak in which head linesman Cal Lepore and umpire Lou Palazzi signaled touchdown, although television replays showed that Manning was stopped short of the goal line. So instead of a 20–17 win, the Rams lost 24–20. In week 2 the Rams needed a last second field goal to tie the Atlanta Falcons, 20–20.

The Rams appeared to right their ship by winning their next four games, including a 20–13 win in San Francisco. But back-to-back losses to the Miami Dolphins and Baltimore Colts left the 4–3–1 Rams 1 1/2 games behind the 6–2 49ers. Then the Rams won 2 straight, including a 17–6 win in San Francisco; that gave the Rams a 1/2-game lead in the division and they held the tiebreaker over the 49ers by virtue of their season sweep of S.F. The Rams then lost a Thanksgiving game in Dallas 28–21, but re-took the division lead with two games to play by beating the Saints 45–28. However, just as they had the year before, the Rams lost a Monday night game at home, this time to the Redskins, coached by former Rams head coach George Allen, 38–24. And just like the previous season's Monday night home loss to the Lions, this one ended up costing the Rams both the division title and the wild card berth (won by the Redskins). The Rams won their final game in Pittsburgh 23–14, but learned on their flight home that the 49ers rallied beat the Lions with a 4th-quarter touchdown, 31–27.

=== Schedule ===
| Week | Date | Opponent | Result | Record | Venue | Attendance |
|---|---|---|---|---|---|---|
| 1 | September 19 | at **New Orleans Saints** | **L** 20–24 | 0–1 | Tulane Stadium | 70,915 |
| 2 | September 26 | **Atlanta Falcons** | **T** 20–20 | 0–1–1 | Los Angeles Memorial Coliseum | 57,895 |
| 3 | October 3 | Chicago Bears | **W** 17–3 | 1–1–1 | Los Angeles Memorial Coliseum | 66,957 |
| 4 | October 10 | at **San Francisco 49ers** | **W** 20–13 | 2–1–1 | Candlestick Park | 44,000 |
| 5 | October 17 | at **Atlanta Falcons** | **W** 24–16 | 3–1–1 | Atlanta Stadium | 58,850 |
| 6 | October 24 | Green Bay Packers | **W** 30–13 | 4–1–1 | Los Angeles Memorial Coliseum | 75,351 |
| 7 | October 31 | Miami Dolphins | **L** 14–20 | 4–2–1 | Los Angeles Memorial Coliseum | 72,903 |
| 8 | November 8 | at Baltimore Colts | **L** 17–24 | 4–3–1 | Memorial Stadium | 57,722 |
| 9 | November 14 | at Detroit Lions | **W** 21–13 | 5–3–1 | Tiger Stadium | 54,418 |
| 10 | November 21 | **San Francisco 49ers** | **W** 17–6 | 6–3–1 | Los Angeles Memorial Coliseum | 80,050 |
| 11 | November 25 | at Dallas Cowboys | **L** 21–28 | 6–4–1 | Texas Stadium | 66,595 |
| 12 | December 5 | **New Orleans Saints** | **W** 45–28 | 7–4–1 | Los Angeles Memorial Coliseum | 73,610 |
| 13 | December 13 | Washington Redskins | **L** 24–38 | 7–5–1 | Los Angeles Memorial Coliseum | 80,402 |
| 14 | December 19 | at Pittsburgh Steelers | **W** 23–14 | 8–5–1 | Three Rivers Stadium | 45,233 |
Note: Intra-division opponents are in **bold** text.

=== Standings ===
NFC West
| | W | L | T | PCT | DIV | CONF | PF | PA | STK |
|---|---|---|---|---|---|---|---|---|---|
| San Francisco 49ers | 9 | 5 | 0 | .643 | 2–4 | 7–4 | 300 | 216 | W2 |
| Los Angeles Rams | 8 | 5 | 1 | .615 | 4–1–1 | 7–3–1 | 313 | 260 | W1 |
| Atlanta Falcons | 7 | 6 | 1 | .538 | 3–2–1 | 4–6–1 | 274 | 277 | W1 |
| New Orleans Saints | 4 | 8 | 2 | .333 | 2–4 | 4–7 | 266 | 347 | L3 |

Note: Tie games were not officially counted in the standings until 1972.
