= 1971 San Francisco 49ers season =

American football team season

- Owner: Josephine Morabito; Jane Morabito
- General manager: Louis Spadia
- Head coach: Dick Nolan
- Home stadium: Candlestick Park

Results
- Record: 9–5
- Division place: 1st NFC West
- Playoffs: Won Divisional Playoffs (vs. Redskins) 24–20; Lost NFC Championship (at Cowboys) 3–14
- Pro Bowlers: C Forrest Blue; TE Ted Kwalick; WR Gene Washington; RB Vic Washington; OLB Dave Wilcox; CB Jimmy Johnson; CB Bruce Taylor

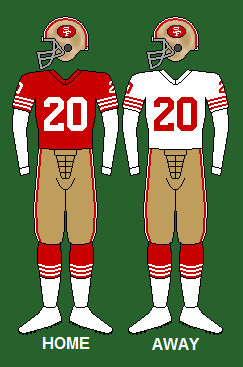
The uniform of the San Francisco 49ers, 1970-1975

The 1971 San Francisco 49ers season was the franchise's 22nd season in the National Football League (NFL) and their 26th overall. The 49ers appeared in the NFC Championship Game for the second consecutive year. The team moved into a new home, eleven-year-old Candlestick Park, which they shared with the baseball Giants.

After winning two of their first three games on the road, the 49ers lost their first game at Candlestick Park to the Los Angeles Rams 20–13. The 49ers rebounded and successfully defended their NFC West title by posting a 9–5 record. For a second year in a row, the 49ers’ season ended in disappointment with a 14–3 loss in the NFC Championship Game to the Dallas Cowboys, this time on the road.

== Offseason ==
1971 San Francisco 49ers draft
| Round | Pick | Player | Position | College | Notes |
| 1 | 23 | Tim Anderson | DB | Ohio State | Signed with Toronto Argonauts (CFL) |
| 2 | 37 | Ernie Janet | G | Washington | |
| 2 | 49 | Joe Orduna | RB | Nebraska | |
| 3 | 55 | Sam Dickerson | WR | USC | |
| 3 | 75 | Willie Parker | C | North Texas State | |
| 4 | 101 | Tony Harris | DB | Toledo | |
| 5 | 114 | Dean Shaternick | T | Kansas State | |
| 5 | 122 | George Wells | LB | New Mexico State | Signed with Toronto Argonauts (CFL) |
| 5 | 127 | Marty Huff | LB | Michigan | Made roster in 1972 |
| 6 | 153 | Al Bresler | WR | Auburn | |
| 7 | 179 | John Watson | G | Oklahoma | |
| 8 | 205 | Jim McCann | P | Arizona State | |
| 9 | 231 | Therman Couch | LB | Iowa State | |
| 10 | 236 | Ron Cardo | RB | Wisconsin–Oshkosh | |
| 10 | 257 | Ernie Jennings | WR | Air Force | |
| 11 | 283 | Joe Reed | QB | Mississippi State | Made roster in 1972 |
| 12 | 309 | Jim Bunch | DT | Wisconsin–Platteville | |
| 13 | 335 | John Bullock | RB | Purdue | |
| 14 | 361 | Bill Dunstan | DT | Utah State | |
| 15 | 387 | John Lennon | T | Colgate | |
| 16 | 414 | Dave Pursell | DT | Kentucky | |
| 17 | 438 | Leroy Charlton | DB | Florida A&M | |
Made roster

== Personnel ==
=== Staff / Coaches ===
1971 San Francisco 49ers staff
| Front office: Team Owner(s) - Josephine Morabito & Jane Morabito; General manager / Team President – Louis Spadia; Personnel Scout - Dick Gallagher; Head coaches: Head coach - Dick Nolan; Offensive coaches: Offensive Coordinator - Jim Shofner; Quarterbacks / Wide Receivers – Jim Shofner; Offensive Backs – Doug Scovil; Offensive Line / Blocking – Dick Stanfel | Defensive coaches: Defensive Coordinator / Defensive Line – Paul Wiggin; Linebackers – Mike Giddings; Defensive Backfield / Secondary – Don Heinrich; Special teams coaches: Special Teams - Chet Franklin |

=== Roster ===
1971 San Francisco 49ers roster
| Quarterbacks (QB): 12 John Brodie; 11 Steve Spurrier; Running backs (RB): 42 Doug Cunningham; 17 John Isenbarger; 35 Larry Schreiber; 22 Vic Washington; 40 Ken Willard; Wide receivers (WR): 85 Preston Riley; 24 Jimmy Thomas; 18 Gene Washington; 88 Dick Witcher; Tight ends (TE): 82 Ted Kwalick; 89 Bob Windsor | Offensive linemen (OL): 79 Cas Banaszek T; 65 Randy Beisler G; 75 Forrest Blue C; 66 Elmer Collett G; 69 Woody Peoples G; 76 Len Rohde T; 67 John Watson T; Defensive linemen (DL): 72 Bill Belk DE; 74 Earl Edwards DT; 86 Cedrick Hardman DE; 53 Tommy Hart DE; 80 Stan Hindman DT; 56 Bob Hoskins DT; 70 Charlie Krueger DT | Linebackers (LB): 50 Ed Beard MLB; 57 Frank Nunley MLB; 58 Jim Sniadecki OLB; 52 Skip Vanderbundt OLB; 64 Dave Wilcox OLB; Defensive backs (DB): 23 Johnny Fuller SS/FS; 37 Jimmy Johnson CB; 32 Mel Phillips SS; 38 Mike Simpson CB/S; 25 Roosevelt Taylor FS; 44 Bruce Taylor CB; Special teams (ST): 30 Bruce Gossett K; 15 Jim McCann P | Practice squad: -- Bill Dunstan DT; 20 Tony Harris CB; 54 Marty Huff LB; -- Ernie Janet G; -- Joe Orduna RB; -- Willie Parker C; 19 Joe Reed QB; Rookies in italics 38 active, 7 practice squad |

== Preseason ==
| Week | Date | Opponent | Result | Record | Venue | Attendance |
|---|---|---|---|---|---|---|
| 1 | August 8 | Cleveland Browns | W 38–24 | 1–0 | Candlestick Park | 40,000 |
| 2 | August 13 | at Miami Dolphins | T 17–17 | 1–0–1 | Miami Orange Bowl | 57,008 |
| 3 | August 22 | San Diego Chargers | W 28–17 | 2–0–1 | Candlestick Park | 40,000 |
| 4 | August 28 | vs. Denver Broncos | W 33–17 | 3–0–1 | Joe Albi Stadium | 33,184 |
| 5 | September 4 | at Oakland Raiders | L 28–34 | 3–1–1 | Oakland–Alameda County Coliseum | 53,696 |
| 6 | September 9 | at Los Angeles Rams | L 20–23 | 3–2–1 | Los Angeles Memorial Coliseum | 55,607 |

== Regular season ==
=== Schedule ===
| Week | Date | Opponent | Result | Record | Venue | Attendance |
|---|---|---|---|---|---|---|
| 1 | September 19 | at **Atlanta Falcons** | **L** 17–20 | 0–1 | Atlanta Stadium | 56,990 |
| 2 | September 26 | at **New Orleans Saints** | **W** 38–20 | 1–1 | Tulane Stadium | 81,595 |
| 3 | October 3 | at Philadelphia Eagles | **W** 31–3 | 2–1 | Veterans Stadium | 65,358 |
| 4 | October 10 | **Los Angeles Rams** | **L** 13–20 | 2–2 | Candlestick Park | 44,000 |
| 5 | October 17 | Chicago Bears | **W** 13–0 | 3–2 | Candlestick Park | 44,000 |
| 6 | October 24 | at St. Louis Cardinals | **W** 26–14 | 4–2 | Busch Memorial Stadium | 50,419 |
| 7 | October 31 | New England Patriots | **W** 27–10 | 5–2 | Candlestick Park | 45,092 |
| 8 | November 7 | at Minnesota Vikings | **W** 13–9 | 6–2 | Metropolitan Stadium | 49,784 |
| 9 | November 14 | **New Orleans Saints** | **L** 20–26 | 6–3 | Candlestick Park | 45,138 |
| 10 | November 21 | at **Los Angeles Rams** | **L** 6–17 | 6–4 | Los Angeles Memorial Coliseum | 80,050 |
| 11 | November 28 | at New York Jets | **W** 24–21 | 7–4 | Shea Stadium | 63,936 |
| 12 | December 6 | Kansas City Chiefs | **L** 17–26 | 7–5 | Candlestick Park | 45,306 |
| 13 | December 12 | **Atlanta Falcons** | **W** 24–3 | 8–5 | Candlestick Park | 44,582 |
| 14 | December 19 | Detroit Lions | **W** 31–27 | 9–5 | Candlestick Park | 45,580 |
Note: Intra-division opponents are in **bold** text.

=== Standings ===
NFC West
| | W | L | T | PCT | DIV | CONF | PF | PA | STK |
|---|---|---|---|---|---|---|---|---|---|
| San Francisco 49ers | 9 | 5 | 0 | .643 | 2–4 | 7–4 | 300 | 216 | W2 |
| Los Angeles Rams | 8 | 5 | 1 | .615 | 4–1–1 | 7–3–1 | 313 | 260 | W1 |
| Atlanta Falcons | 7 | 6 | 1 | .538 | 3–2–1 | 4–6–1 | 274 | 277 | W1 |
| New Orleans Saints | 4 | 8 | 2 | .333 | 2–4 | 4–7 | 266 | 347 | L3 |

Note: Tie games were not officially counted in the standings until 1972.

== Postseason ==
=== Schedule ===
| Round | Date | Opponent | Result | Record | Venue | Attendance |
|---|---|---|---|---|---|---|
| Divisional | December 26 | Washington Redskins | W 24–20 | 1–0 | Candlestick Park | 45,327 |
| NFC Championship | January 2, 1972 | at Dallas Cowboys | L 3–14 | 1–1 | Texas Stadium | 63,409 |

=== Game summaries ===
==== NFC Championship: vs. Dallas Cowboys ====
NFC Championship: Dallas Cowboys at San Francisco 49ers – Game summary

| Quarter | 1 | 2 | 3 | 4 | Total |
|---|---|---|---|---|---|
| 49ers | 0 | 0 | 3 | 0 | 3 |
| Cowboys | 0 | 7 | 0 | 7 | 14 |

at Texas Stadium, Irving, Texas

- Date: January 2, 1972
- Game time: 1:30 p.m. EST/12:30 p.m. CST
- Game attendance: 63,409
- Referee: Tommy Bell
- TV announcers (CBS): Jack Buck and Pat Summerall

Scoring summary

| Quarter | Time | Drive | | | Team | Scoring information | Score | |
| Quarter | Time | Plays | Yards | TOP | Team | Scoring information | SF | DAL |
|---|---|---|---|---|---|---|---|---|
| 2 | | | | | Cowboys | Calvin Hill 1-yard touchdown run, Mike Clark kick good | 0 | 7 |
| 3 | | | | | 49ers | 28-yard field goal by Bruce Gossett | 3 | 7 |
| 4 | | | | | Cowboys | Duane Thomas 2-yard touchdown run, Mike Clark kick good | 3 | 14 |
| "TOP" = time of possession. For other American football terms, see Glossary of American football. | | | | | | | 3 | 14 |
