= 1971 St. Louis Cardinals (NFL) season =

American football team season

1971 St. Louis Cardinals season
- Owner: Bidwill brothers (Charles, Jr. & Bill)
- Head coach: Bob Hollway
- Home stadium: Busch Memorial Stadium

Results
- Record: 4–9–1
- Division place: 4th NFC East
- Playoffs: Did not qualify
- Pro Bowlers: CB Roger Wehrli

The 1971 St. Louis Cardinals season was the 52nd season the team was in the National Football League and twelfth in St. Louis. Led by first-year head coach Bob Hollway, the Cardinals failed to improve on their previous year's 8–5–1 record, winning only four games. They failed to reach the playoffs for the 23rd straight season, their previous appearance was in 1948 in the championship game.

This was the last season the team was co-owned by Charles Bidwill, Jr.; he sold his share to his younger brother Bill in September 1972. The adopted sons of Charles and Violet Bidwill, the two had co-owned the team since their mother's death in January 1962.

Hired in February, Hollway was previously the defensive coordinator of the Minnesota Vikings under head coach Bud Grant.

== Offseason ==
=== NFL draft ===
1971 St. Louis Cardinals draft
Round	Pick	Player	Position	College	Notes
1	17	Norm Thompson	Cornerback	Utah	
2	43	Dan Dierdorf * ^{†}	Offensive tackle	Michigan	
3	61	James Livesay	Wide receiver	Richmond	
4	95	Larry Willingham	Defensive back	Auburn	
5	121	Rocky Wallace	Linebacker	Missouri	
6	147	Mel Gray *	Wide receiver	Missouri	
Made roster † Pro Football Hall of Fame * Made at least one Pro Bowl during career

== Personnel ==
=== Staff / Coaches ===
1971 St. Louis Cardinals staff
Front office: Principal Owner/de facto General Manager - Bill Bidwill; Partial Owner / Team President - Charles Bidwill Jr.; Head coaches: Head Coach – Bob Hollway; Offensive coaches: Offensive Backfield - Leeman Bennett; Offensive line – Joe Spencer; Receivers Coach – Lew Carpenter	Defensive coaches: Defensive Coordinator / Linebackers Coach – Dick Voris; Defensive Line – Bob Leach; Defensive Backs - Chuck Drulis; Special teams coaches: Special Teams / Special Assignments - Tony Versaci

=== Roster ===
1971 St. Louis Cardinals roster
Quarterbacks: 10 Pete Beathard; 17 Jim Hart; 16 Tim Van Galder; Running backs: 39 Cid Edwards; 23 Johnny Roland; 27 Roy Shivers; 35 Larry Stegent; 30 Paul White; Wide receivers: 44 John Gilliam; 85 Mel Gray; 88 Fred Hyatt; 80 Dave Williams; Tight ends: 83 Jim McFarland; 81 Jackie Smith	Offensive linemen: 72 Dan Dierdorf G; 76 Vern Emerson T; 55 Irv Goode G; 65 Chuck Hutchison G; 73 Ernie McMillan T; 50 Wayne Mulligan C; 74 Bob Reynolds T; 63 Clyde Williams G; Defensive linemen: 68 Paul Dickson DT; 70 Rolf Krueger DT/DE; 75 Bob Rowe DT; 82 Joe Schmiesing DE/DT; 79 Chuck Walker DE; 78 Ron Yankowski DE	Linebackers: 60 Jim Hargrove MLB; 56 Mike McGill OLB; 58 Terry Miller OLB; 52 Rick Ogle OLB; 53 Jamie Rivers MLB; 67 Larry Stallings OLB; Defensive backs: 37 Jeff Allen CB; 20 Miller Farr CB; 49 Dale Hackbart SS; 45 George Hoey CB; 46 Tom Longo FS; 28 Ted Provost SS; 21 Jerry Stovall SS; 43 Norm Thompson CB; 22 Roger Wehrli CB/FS; 33 Larry Willingham FS/SS; 8 Larry Wilson FS/SS; Special teams: 25 Jim Bakken K; 26 Chuck Latourette P	Reserve lists: 54 Tom Banks C (IR); 24 Terry Brown S (IR); 74 Fred Heron DT (IR); 36 MacArthur Lane RB (Susp.); 18 David Olivo QB (IR); 69 Rocky Wallace LB (IR); Practice squad rookies in italics

== Schedule ==
Week	Date	Opponent	Result	Record	Venue	Attendance
1	September 19	**Washington Redskins**	**L** 17–24	0–1	Busch Memorial Stadium	46,805
2	September 27	New York Jets	**W** 17–10	1–1	Busch Memorial Stadium	50,358
3	October 3	**New York Giants**	**L** 20–21	1–2	Busch Memorial Stadium	49,571
4	October 10	at Atlanta Falcons	**W** 26–9	2–2	Atlanta Stadium	58,850
5	October 17	at **Washington Redskins**	**L** 0–20	2–3	RFK Stadium	53,041
6	October 24	San Francisco 49ers	**L** 14–26	2–4	Busch Memorial Stadium	50,419
7	October 31	at Buffalo Bills	**W** 28–23	3–4	War Memorial Stadium	40,040
8	November 7	**Dallas Cowboys**	**L** 13–16	3–5	Busch Memorial Stadium	50,486
9	November 15	at San Diego Chargers	**L** 17–20	3–6	San Diego Stadium	46,486
10	November 21	**Philadelphia Eagles**	**L** 20–37	3–7	Busch Memorial Stadium	48,658
11	November 28	at **New York Giants**	**W** 24–7	4–7	Yankee Stadium	62,878
12	December 5	Green Bay Packers	**T** 16–16	4–7–1	Busch Memorial Stadium	50,443
13	December 12	at **Philadelphia Eagles**	**L** 7–19	4–8–1	Veterans Stadium	65,358
14	December 18	at **Dallas Cowboys**	**L** 12–31	4–9–1	Texas Stadium	66,672
Note: Intra-division opponents are in **bold** text.

=== Standings ===
NFC East
	W	L	T	PCT	DIV	CONF	PF	PA	STK
Dallas Cowboys	11	3	0	.786	7–1	8–3	406	222	W7
Washington Redskins	9	4	1	.692	6–1–1	8–2–1	276	190	L1
Philadelphia Eagles	6	7	1	.462	4–3–1	5–5–1	221	302	W3
St. Louis Cardinals	4	9	1	.308	1–7	2–8–1	231	279	L2
New York Giants	4	10	0	.286	1–7	3–8	228	362	L5

Note: Tie games were not officially counted in the standings until 1972.
