= 1971 Dallas Cowboys season =

NFL team season

- Owner: Clint Murchison Jr.
- General manager: Tex Schramm
- Head coach: Tom Landry
- Home stadium: Cotton Bowl; Texas Stadium

Results
- Record: 11–3
- Division place: 1st NFC East
- Playoffs: Won Divisional Playoffs (at Vikings) 20–12; Won NFC Championship (vs. 49ers) 14–3; Won Super Bowl VI (vs. Dolphins) 24–3

The 1971 Dallas Cowboys season was the franchise's 12th season in the National Football League (NFL), the first at the new Texas Stadium in suburban Irving, Texas, and the 12th season under head coach Tom Landry. The Cowboys led the NFL with 406 points scored. Their defense allowed 222 points.

For the sixth consecutive season, the Cowboys had a first-place finish. They won their second-consecutive NFC championship, then defeated the Miami Dolphins 24–3 in Super Bowl VI to capture their first Super Bowl championship. They were the first team from the NFC to win a Super Bowl since the 1970 merger of the NFL and the American Football League (AFL), and subsequently, the first team from the NFC East division to win the title.

== NFL draft ==
The 1971 NFL draft was widely regarded as one of the weakest in the franchise's history, although the Cowboys recoupled draft picks by trading Tody Smith and Ike Thomas to other teams. Third-round selection Bill Gregory played seven seasons with the Cowboys, winning two Super Bowl rings. Eighth-round selection Ron Jessie was cut after the Cowboys acquired San Diego Chargers All-Pro Lance Alworth, but later enjoyed a long and successful NFL career with the Detroit Lions and Los Angeles Rams.

1971 Dallas Cowboys draft
Round	Pick	Player	Position	College	Notes
1	25	Tody Smith	DE	USC	
2	51	Ike Thomas	DB	Bishop	
3	69	Sam Scarber	RB	New Mexico	
3	77	Bill Gregory	DT	Wisconsin	
4	80	Joe Carter	TE	Grambling State	
4	103	Adam Mitchell	OT	Ole Miss	
5	129	Ron Kadziel	LB	Stanford	
6	155	Steve Maier	WR	Northern Arizona	
7	181	Bill Griffin	OT	Catawba	
8	206	Ron Jessie *	WR	Kansas	
9	233	Honor Jackson	DB	Pacific	
10	259	Rodney Wallace	OT	New Mexico	
11	285	Ernest Bonwell	DT	Lane	
12	311	Steve Goepel	QB	Colgate	
13	337	James Ford	RB	Texas Southern	
14	363	Tyrone Couey	DB	Utah State	
15	389	Bob Young	TE	Delaware	
16	415	John Brennan	OT	Boston College	
17	440	John Bomer	C	Memphis	
Made roster † Pro Football Hall of Fame * Made at least one Pro Bowl during career

== Roster ==
Dallas Cowboys 1971 roster
Quarterbacks: 14 Craig Morton; 12 Roger Staubach; Running backs: 32 Walt Garrison; 35 Calvin Hill; 30 Dan Reeves; 33 Duane Thomas; 42 Claxton Welch; Wide receivers: 19 Lance Alworth; 22 Bob Hayes; 31 Gloster Richardson; Tight ends: 89 Mike Ditka; 87 Billy Truax	Offensive linemen: 62 John Fitzgerald C/G; 79 Forrest Gregg G/T; 64 Tony Liscio T; 51 Dave Manders C; 76 John Niland G; 61 Blaine Nye G; 71 Rodney Wallace G/T; 70 Rayfield Wright T; Defensive linemen: 66 George Andrie DE; 63 Larry Cole DE; 77 Bill Gregory DT; 74 Bob Lilly DT; 75 Jethro Pugh DT; 85 Tody Smith DE; 67 Pat Toomay DE	Linebackers: 60 Lee Roy Caffey OLB; 52 Dave Edwards OLB; 54 Chuck Howley OLB; 55 Lee Roy Jordan MLB; 50 D. D. Lewis OLB; Defensive backs: 26 Herb Adderley CB; 34 Cornell Green SS; 43 Cliff Harris FS; 20 Mel Renfro CB; 37 Ike Thomas CB; 41 Charlie Waters FS; Special teams: 83 Mike Clark K; 10 Ron Widby P	Reserve lists: 78 Bob Asher T (IR); 73 Ralph Neely T (NF-Inj.); 56 Tom Stincic LB (IR); 46 Mark Washington CB (IR); Taxi squad: 23 Margene Adkins WR; 15 Toni Fritsch K; -- Steve Goepel QB; -- Ron Kadziel LB; -- John Nelson TE; 72 Don Talbert T; 36 Joe Williams RB; Rookies in italics 40 active, 11 inactive

== Preseason ==
Week	Date	Opponent	Result	Record	Game Site	Attendance	Recap
1	August 6	at Los Angeles Rams	W 45–21	1–0	Los Angeles Memorial Coliseum	87,187	Recap
2	August 14	New Orleans Saints	W 36–21	2–0	Cotton Bowl	73,560	Recap
3	August 20	Cleveland Browns	W 16–15	3–0	Cotton Bowl	69,099	Recap
4	August 26	at Houston Oilers	W 28–20	4–0	Houston Astrodome	49,078	Recap
5	September 3	at Baltimore Colts	W 27–14	5–0	Memorial Stadium	22,291	Recap
6	September 11	Kansas City Chiefs	W 24–17	6–0	Cotton Bowl	74,035	Recap

== Season recap ==
The Cowboys opened the new Texas Stadium with a 44–21 win over the New England Patriots on Oct. 24. Duane Thomas scored the first touchdown, a 56-yard run two minutes and 16 seconds after the start of the game. Attendance was 65,708 persons.

The team entered the season still having the reputation of "not being able to win the big games" and "next year's champion". The Super Bowl V loss added more fuel to that widely held view. As in the previous season, Dallas had a quarterback controversy as Roger Staubach and Craig Morton alternated as starting quarterback (in a loss to the Bears in game 7, Morton and Staubach alternated plays). The Cowboys were 4–3 at the season midpoint. But after head coach Tom Landry settled on Staubach, the Cowboys won their last seven regular season games to finish with an 11–3 record.

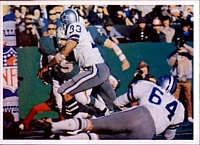
Cowboys' running back Duane Thomas rushing the ball for a touchdown in Super Bowl VI.

Staubach finished the regular season as the NFL's top-rated passer (101.8) by throwing for 1,882 yards, 15 touchdowns, and 4 interceptions. He was also a frequent rusher, gaining 343 yards and 2 touchdowns on 41 carries. Said Cold Hard Football Facts of Staubach's 1971 season, "Staubach finally out-jockeyed Craig Morton for the starting gig with the Cowboys in 1971 and instantly produced one of the greatest passing seasons in history. The numbers are not big and gaudy, but they were ruthlessly efficient –- the 104.8 passer rating notable in a season in which the average rating was 62.2. His 8.9 [yards-per-attempt] in the regular season is phenomenal in any era of the NFL, as was his 18 [touchdowns] against a meager 4 [interceptions] (including postseason). The Cowboys did not lose any of Staubach's 13 starts in 1971 and he lifted the proverbial "team that couldn't win the big game" to its long-awaited first NFL championship.[...]"

Dallas also had an outstanding trio of running backs, Walt Garrison, Duane Thomas, and Calvin Hill, who rushed for a combined total of 1,690 yards and 14 touchdowns during the season. Garrison led the team in receptions during the season. (Thomas, upset that the Cowboys would not renegotiate his contract after his excellent rookie year, had stopped talking to the press and to almost everyone on the team). Wide receivers Bob Hayes and Lance Alworth also provided a deep threat, catching a combined total of 69 passes for 1,327 yards and 10 touchdowns. The offensive line, anchored by all-pro tackle Rayfield Wright, Pro Bowlers John Niland and Ralph Neely, and #64 Tony Liscio who was coaxed out of retirement by Tom Landry after Ralph Neely got injured off the field, was also a primary reason for their success on offense. (Neely had broken his leg in November in a dirt-bike accident, and was replaced first by Gregg and then by Tony Liscio, who came out of retirement.)

The Dallas defense (nicknamed the "Doomsday Defense") had given up only one touchdown in the last 25 quarters prior to the Super Bowl. Their defensive line was anchored by Pro Bowl defensive tackle Bob Lilly, who excelled at pressuring quarterbacks and breaking up running plays. Dallas also had an outstanding trio of linebackers: Pro Bowler Chuck Howley, who recorded 5 interceptions and returned them for 122 yards; Dave Edwards 2 interceptions; and Lee Roy Jordan, who recorded 2 interceptions. The Cowboys secondary was led by 2 future hall of fame cornerbacks Herb Adderley (6 interceptions for 182 return yards) and Mel Renfro (4 interceptions for 11 yards). Safeties Cliff Harris and Pro Bowler Cornell Green also combined for 4 interceptions. After the 1971 season, Bob Lilly would play in the last of his last Pro Bowl games, despite being selected after the 1972 and 1973 seasons. Lilly would also score his final career touchdown in a 42–7 smashing of The Philadelphia Eagles. Lilly retired with the NFL record for scoring the most TDs by a defensive lineman with 4.

- September 26, 1971 – Herb Adderley became the first Cowboy to have three interceptions in one game.
- October 11, 1971 – The Cowboys earned their first win on Monday Night Football by defeating the New York Giants 20–13, which was also the last game the Cowboys played in the Cotton Bowl.

=== Schedule ===
Week	Date	Opponent	Result	Record	Game Site	Attendance	Recap
1	September 19	at Buffalo Bills	**W** 49–37	1–0	War Memorial Stadium	46,206	Recap
2	September 26	at **Philadelphia Eagles**	**W** 42–7	2–0	Veterans Stadium	65,358	Recap
3	October 3	**Washington Redskins**	**L** 16–20	2–1	Cotton Bowl	61,554	Recap
4	October 11	**New York Giants**	**W** 20–13	3–1	Cotton Bowl	68,378	Recap
5	October 17	at New Orleans Saints	**L** 14–24	3–2	Tulane Stadium	83,088	Recap
6	October 24	New England Patriots	**W** 44–21	4–2	Texas Stadium	65,708	Recap
7	October 31	at Chicago Bears	**L** 19–23	4–3	Soldier Field	55,049	Recap
8	November 7	at **St. Louis Cardinals**	**W** 16–13	5–3	Busch Memorial Stadium	50,486	Recap
9	November 14	**Philadelphia Eagles**	**W** 20–7	6–3	Texas Stadium	60,178	Recap
10	November 21	at **Washington Redskins**	**W** 13–0	7–3	RFK Stadium	53,041	Recap
11	November 25	Los Angeles Rams	**W** 28–21	8–3	Texas Stadium	66,595	Recap
12	December 4	New York Jets	**W** 52–10	9–3	Texas Stadium	66,689	Recap
13	December 12	at **New York Giants**	**W** 42–14	10–3	Yankee Stadium	62,815	Recap
14	December 18	**St. Louis Cardinals**	**W** 31–12	11–3	Texas Stadium	66,672	Recap

Division opponents are in bold text

=== Standings ===
NFC East
	W	L	T	PCT	DIV	CONF	PF	PA	STK
Dallas Cowboys	11	3	0	.786	7–1	8–3	406	222	W7
Washington Redskins	9	4	1	.692	6–1–1	8–2–1	276	190	L1
Philadelphia Eagles	6	7	1	.462	4–3–1	5–5–1	221	302	W3
St. Louis Cardinals	4	9	1	.308	1–7	2–8–1	231	279	L2
New York Giants	4	10	0	.286	1–7	3–8	228	362	L5

Note: Tie games were not officially counted in the standings until 1972.

=== Game summaries ===
==== Week 1 ====
Week One: Dallas Cowboys (0–0) at Buffalo Bills (0–0)

Quarter	1	2	3	4	Total
**Cowboys**	7	21	7	14	**49**
Bills	14	10	6	7	**37**

at War Memorial Stadium • Buffalo, New York

- Date: September 19
- Game time: 1:00 p.m. EDT
- Game weather: 55 °F (13 °C) • Wind 9 miles per hour (14 km/h; 7.8 kn)
- Referee: Fred Swearingen
- TV announcers (CBS): Frank Glieber and Eddie LeBaron
- Box Score

Scoring summary

Quarter	Time	Drive			Team	Scoring information	Score	
Quarter	Time	Plays	Yards	TOP	Team	Scoring information	Cowboys	Bills
1					Cowboys	Calvin Hill 2-yard touchdown run, Mike Clark kick good	7	0
1					Bills	Haven Moses 73-yard touchdown reception from Dennis Shaw, Grant Guthrie kick good	7	7
1					Bills	O. J. Simpson 6-yard touchdown run, Grant Guthrie kick good	7	14
2					Cowboys	Bob Hayes 76-yard touchdown reception from Craig Morton, Mike Clark kick good	14	14
2					Cowboys	Walt Garrison 3-yard touchdown run, Mike Clark kick good	21	14
2					Bills	40-yard field goal by Grant Guthrie	21	17
2					Bills	Marlin Briscoe 75-yard touchdown reception from Dennis Shaw, Grant Guthrie kick good	21	24
2					Cowboys	Calvin Hill 3-yard touchdown run, Mike Clark kick good	28	24
3					Bills	Marlin Briscoe 23-yard touchdown reception from Dennis Shaw, Grant Guthrie kick no good	28	30
3					Cowboys	Reggie Rucker 19-yard touchdown reception from Craig Morton, Mike Clark kick good	35	30
4					Cowboys	Calvin Hill 1-yard touchdown run, Mike Clark kick good	42	30
4					Cowboys	Calvin Hill 1-yard touchdown run, Mike Clark kick good	49	30
4					Bills	Ike Hill 26-yard touchdown reception from Dennis Shaw, Grant Guthrie kick good	49	37
"TOP" = time of possession. For other American football terms, see Glossary of American football.							49	37

==== Week 2 ====
Team	1	2	3	4	Total
• Cowboys	0	21	7	14	42
Eagles	0	0	0	7	7

- Date: September 26
- Location: Veterans Stadium, Philadelphia
- Game start: 1:00 p.m.
- Game weather: 59 °F (15 °C); wind 7 mph (11 km/h)
- Referee: Bob Frederic
- TV announcers (CBS): Frank Glieber and Eddie LeBaron

Scoring summary
Q2	DAL	Hill 1 yard run (Clark kick)	DAL 7–0
Q2	DAL	Lilly 7 yard fumble return (Clark kick)	DAL 14–0
Q2	DAL	Garrison 4 yard pass from Morton (Clark kick)	DAL 21–0
Q3	DAL	Richardson 16 yard pass from Morton (Clark kick)	DAL 28–0
Q4	DAL	Morton 2 yard run (Clark kick)	DAL 35–0
Q4	DAL	Welch 2 yard run (Clark kick)	DAL 42–0
Q4	PHI	Nelson 102 yard field goal return (Feller kick)	DAL 42–7

==== Week 4 ====
Team	1	2	3	4	Total
Giants	3	3	0	7	13
• **Cowboys**	3	10	7	0	20

- Date: October 11
- Location: Cotton Bowl, Dallas, Texas
- Game start: 8:00 p.m. CDT
- Game weather: 64 °F (18 °C) • Wind 7 mph (11 km/h)
- Referee: Tommy Bell
- TV announcers (ABC): Frank Gifford, Howard Cosell, and Don Meredith

Scoring summary
1	DAL	Mike Clark 42-yard field goal	Cowboys 3–0
1	NYG	Pete Gogolak 35-yard field goal	Tie 3–3
2	DAL	Mike Clark 41-yard field goal	Cowboys 6–3
2	NYG	Pete Gogolak 20-yard field goal	Tie 6–6
2	DAL	Billy Truax 4-yard pass from Roger Staubach (Mike Clark kick)	Cowboys 13–6
3	DAL	Bob Hayes 48-yard pass from Craig Morton (Mike Clark kick)	Cowboys 20–6
4	NYG	Clifton McNeil 24-yard pass from Fran Tarkenton (Pete Gogolak kick)	Cowboys 20–13

Last game at the Cotton Bowl

==== Week 6 ====
Team	1	2	3	4	Total
Patriots	7	0	0	14	21
• **Cowboys**	10	24	0	10	44

- Date: October 24
- Location: Texas Stadium, Irving, Texas
- Game start: 1:00 p.m. CDT
- Game weather: 62 °F (17 °C) • Wind 6 mph (9.7 km/h)
- Referee: Fred Wyant
- TV announcers (NBC): Jay Randolph and Dave Kocourek

Scoring summary
1	DAL	Duane Thomas 56-yard run (Mike Clark kick)	Cowboys 7–0
1	DAL	Mike Clark 16-yard field goal	Cowboys 10–0
1	NE	Jim Nance 1-yard run (Charlie Gogolak kick)	Cowboys 10–7
2	DAL	Roger Staubach 2-yard run (Mike Clark kick)	Cowboys 17–7
2	DAL	Mike Clark 17-yard field goal	Cowboys 20–7
2	DAL	Bob Hayes 35-yard pass from Roger Staubach (Mike Clark kick)	Cowboys 27–7
2	DAL	Bob Hayes 28-yard pass from Roger Staubach (Mike Clark kick)	Cowboys 34–7
4	DAL	Mike Clark 12-yard field goal	Cowboys 37–7
4	NE	Randy Vataha 33-yard pass from Jim Plunkett (Charlie Gogolak kick)	Cowboys 37–14
4	DAL	Joe Williams 2-yard run (Mike Clark kick)	Cowboys 44–14
4	NE	Tom Beer 31-yard pass from Jim Plunkett (Charlie Gogolak kick)	Cowboys 44–21

Dallas' first game at Texas Stadium.

==== Week 8 ====
Team	1	2	3	4	Total
• Cowboys	3	0	3	10	16
Cardinals	0	10	0	3	13

- Date: November 7
- Location: Busch Stadium, St. Louis, Missouri
- Game start: 1:00 p.m. CST
- Game weather: 29 °F (−2 °C); wind 11 mph (18 km/h)
- Referee: Fred Swearingen

Scoring summary
Q1	DAL	Fritsch 27 yard field goal	DAL 3–0
Q2	STL	Bakken 41 yard field goal	Tie 3–3
Q2	STL	Williams 11 yard pass from Hart (Bakken kick)	STL 10–3
Q3	DAL	Fritsch 14 yard field goal	STL 10–6
Q4	DAL	Ditka 4 yard pass from Staubach (Reeves run)	DAL 13–10
Q4	STL	Bakken 36 yard field goal	TIE 13–13
Q4	DAL	Fritsch 26 yard field goal	DAL 16–13

==== Week 9 ====
Team	1	2	3	4	Total
Eagles	0	0	0	7	7
• Cowboys	3	7	7	3	20

- Date: November 14
- Location: Texas Stadium, Irving, Texas
- Game start: 1:00 p.m. CST
- Game weather: 73 °F (23 °C); wind 17 mph (27 km/h)
- Referee: Jim Tunney

Scoring summary
Q1	DAL	Fritsch 23 yard field goal	DAL 3–0
Q2	DAL	Thomas 1 yard run (Fritsch kick)	DAL 10–0
Q3	DAL	Thomas 13 yard run (Fritsch kick)	DAL 17–0
Q4	DAL	Fritsch 46 yard field goal	DAL 20–0
Q4	PHI	Liske 1 yard run (Feller kick)	DAL 20–7

== Playoffs ==
Round	Date	Opponent	Result	Game Site	Attendance	Recap
Divisional	December 25	at Minnesota Vikings	W 20–12	Metropolitan Stadium	47,307	Recap
NFC Championship	January 2	San Francisco 49ers	W 14–3	Texas Stadium	63,409	Recap
Super Bowl VI	January 16	vs Miami Dolphins	W 24–3	Tulane Stadium	81,023	Recap

=== NFC Divisional Playoff ===
Dallas Cowboys 20, Minnesota Vikings 12

Quarter	1	2	3	4	Total
Cowboys	3	3	14	0	20
Vikings	0	3	0	9	12

at Metropolitan Stadium, Bloomington, Minnesota

- Date: December 25, 1971
- Game time: 1:00 p.m. EST/12:00 p.m. CST
- Game weather: 31 °F (−1 °C), mostly cloudy
- Game attendance: 47,307
- Referee: Norm Schachter
- TV announcers (CBS): Jack Whitaker and Irv Cross

Scoring summary

Quarter	Time	Drive			Team	Scoring information	Score	
Quarter	Time	Plays	Yards	TOP	Team	Scoring information	DAL	MIN
1					Cowboys	26-yard field goal by Mike Clark	3	0
2					Vikings	27-yard field goal by Fred Cox	3	3
2					Cowboys	44-yard field goal by Mike Clark	6	3
3					Cowboys	Duane Thomas 13-yard touchdown run, Mike Clark kick good	13	3
3					Cowboys	Bob Hayes 9-yard touchdown reception from Roger Staubach, Mike Clark kick good	20	3
4					Vikings	Roger Staubach tackled in end zone for a safety by Alan Page	20	5
4					Vikings	Stu Voigt 6-yard touchdown reception from Gary Cuozzo, Fred Cox kick good	20	12
"TOP" = time of possession. For other American football terms, see Glossary of American football.							20	12

=== NFC Championship Game ===
Dallas Cowboys 14, San Francisco 49ers 3

Quarter	1	2	3	4	Total
49ers	0	0	3	0	3
Cowboys	0	7	0	7	14

at Texas Stadium, Irving, Texas

- Date: January 2, 1972
- Game time: 1:30 p.m. EST/12:30 p.m. CST
- Game attendance: 63,409
- Referee: Tommy Bell
- TV announcers (CBS): Jack Buck and Pat Summerall

Scoring summary

Quarter	Time	Drive			Team	Scoring information	Score	
Quarter	Time	Plays	Yards	TOP	Team	Scoring information	SF	DAL
2					Cowboys	Calvin Hill 1-yard touchdown run, Mike Clark kick good	0	7
3					49ers	28-yard field goal by Bruce Gossett	3	7
4					Cowboys	Duane Thomas 2-yard touchdown run, Mike Clark kick good	3	14
"TOP" = time of possession. For other American football terms, see Glossary of American football.							3	14

=== Super Bowl VI ===
Dallas Cowboys 24, Miami Dolphins 3

Quarter	1	2	3	4	Total
Cowboys	3	7	7	7	24
Dolphins	0	3	0	0	3

at Tulane Stadium, New Orleans, Louisiana

- Date: January 16, 1972
- Game time: 2:30 p.m. EST/1:30 p.m. CST
- Referee: Jim Tunney
- TV announcers (CBS): Ray Scott and Pat Summerall

Scoring summary

Quarter	Time	Drive			Team	Scoring information	Score	
Quarter	Time	Plays	Yards	TOP	Team	Scoring information	DAL	MIA
1					Cowboys	9-yard field goal by Mike Clark	3	0
2					Cowboys	Lance Alworth 7-yard touchdown reception from Roger Staubach, Mike Clark kick good	10	0
2					Dolphins	31-yard field goal by Garo Yepremian	10	3
3					Cowboys	Duane Thomas 3-yard touchdown run, Mike Clark kick good	17	3
4					Cowboys	Mike Ditka 7-yard touchdown reception from Roger Staubach, Mike Clark kick good	24	3
"TOP" = time of possession. For other American football terms, see Glossary of American football.							24	3

== Awards and records ==
- Led NFC, Fewest Rushing Yards Allowed, 1,144 yards
- Led NFL, 401 Points Scored
- Led NFL, 5,035 Total Yards Gained
- Herb Adderley, Three Interceptions in One Game, Club Record
- Roger Staubach, MVP, Super Bowl VI
- Roger Staubach, NFL Passing Leader
- Roger Staubach, Led NFL, 2,786 pass yards
- Roger Staubach, Bert Bell Award
- Roger Staubach, NFC Pro Bowl
- Roger Staubach, All-Pro Quarterback
- Duane Thomas, NFL Touchdown Leader (13 – 11 Rushing, 2 Receiving)
- Chuck Howley, NFC Pro Bowl
