= Reynaud Moore =

American football player (born 1949)

No. 21
- Position: Safety

Personal information
- Born: October 17, 1949 (age 77); Los Angeles, California, U.S.
- Listed height: 6 ft 2 in (1.88 m)
- Listed weight: 190 lb (86 kg)

Career information
- High school: Susan Miller Dorsey
- College: UCLA
- NFL draft: 1971: undrafted

Career history
- New Orleans Saints (1971); Chicago Bears (1972)*; New England Patriots (1973)*
- * Offseason or practice squad member only
- Stats at Pro Football Reference

Reynaud Eric Moore (born October 17, 1949) is an American former professional football player who was a defensive back for the New Orleans Saints of National Football League (NFL). He played college football for the UCLA.

Moore works as a management consultant. He is founder and COO of Reynaud E. Moore & Associates, Inc., Consultants to Management (REMA).
