= 1971 Minnesota Vikings season =

NFL team season

- General manager: Jim Finks
- Head coach: Bud Grant
- Home stadium: Metropolitan Stadium

Results
- Record: 11–3
- Division place: 1st NFC Central
- Playoffs: Lost Divisional Playoffs (vs. Cowboys) 12–20
- All-Pros: DE Carl Eller (1st team); DT Alan Page (1st team); T Ron Yary (1st team)
- Pro Bowlers: DE Carl Eller; WR Bob Grim; S Paul Krause; DT Alan Page; T Ron Yary

Uniform
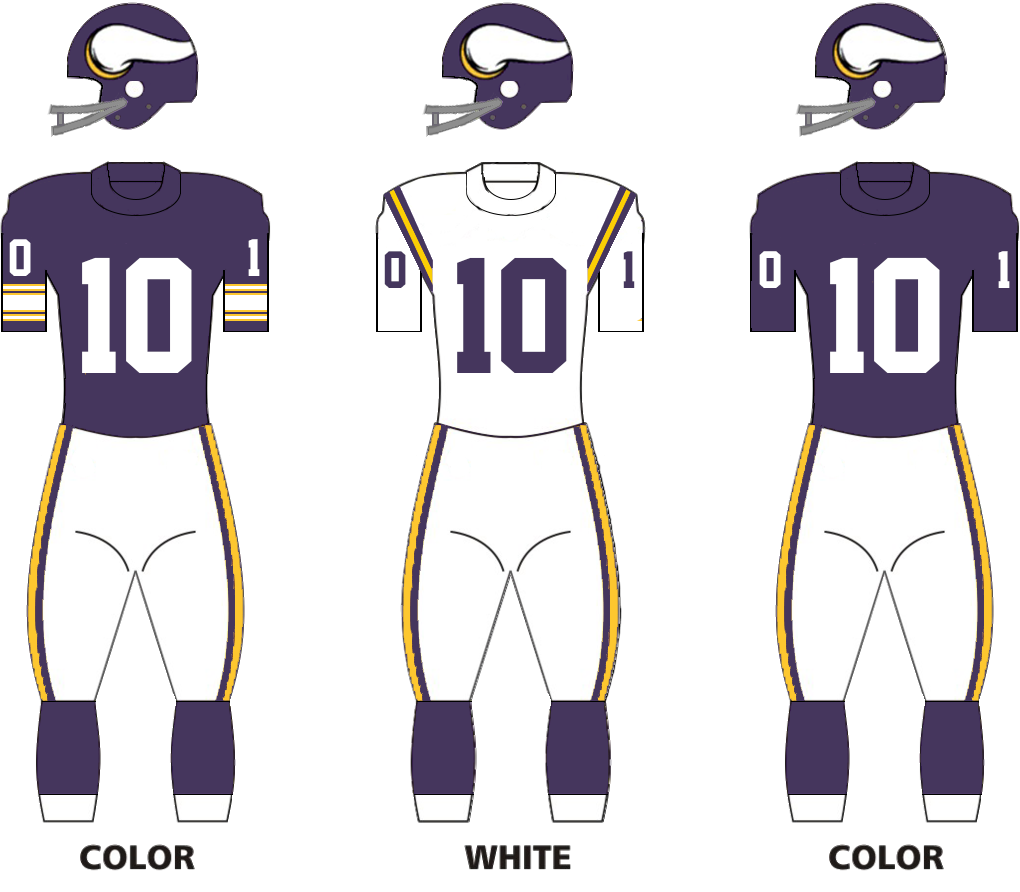

The 1971 season was the Minnesota Vikings' 11th in the National Football League (NFL). They finished with an 11–3 record to win the NFC Central title and return to the playoffs for the fourth consecutive season; however, they lost 20–12 at home to the eventual Super Bowl champion Dallas Cowboys in the divisional round.

In 2007, ESPN.com ranked the 1971 Vikings as the fourth-greatest defense in NFL history, saying, "Considering that their motto was 'Meet at the quarterback,' it's no surprise that the Purple People Eaters held opposing QBs to a 40.4 rating, one of the lowest ever." ESPN also noted that the 1971 Vikings "shut out three opponents, and only one team scored more than 20 points against them. As a result, Alan Page became the first defensive player to ever be named NFL MVP. Carl Eller, Jim Marshall and safety Paul Krause joined Page on the All-Pro team."

== Offseason ==
=== 1971 draft ===
1971 Minnesota Vikings Draft
| Draft order | | Player name | Position | College | Notes |
| Round | Selection | Player name | Position | College | Notes |
|---|---|---|---|---|---|
| 1 | 24 | Leo Hayden | Running back | Ohio State | |
| 2 | 50 | Traded to the Philadelphia Eagles (Note: The Vikings traded their second- and sixth-round selections (50th and 154th overall), a 1972 third-round selection (76th overall) and OT Steve Smith to the Eagles in exchange for QB Norm Snead.) | | | |
| 3 | 76 | Eddie Hackett | Wide receiver | Alcorn A&M | |
| 4 | 102 | Vince Clements | Running back | Connecticut | |
| 5 | 128 | Traded to the Pittsburgh Steelers (Note: The Vikings traded their fifth-round selection (128th overall) to the Steelers in exchange for QB Kent Nix.) | | | |
| 6 | 154 | Traded to the Philadelphia Eagles | | | |
| 7 | 180 | Gene Mack | Linebacker | UTEP | |
| 8 | 208 | John Farley | Defensive end | Johnson C. Smith | Originally Colts pick (Note: The Vikings originally had 206th overall but passed, allowing the Cowboys and Colts to move up before the Vikings eventually selected in the 208th overall pick.) |
| 9 | 232 | Tim Sullivan | Running back | Iowa | |
| 10 | 258 | Chris Morris | Guard | Indiana | |
| 11 | 284 | Mike Walker | Linebacker | Tulane | |
| 12 | 310 | Reggie Holmes | Defensive back | Stout State | |
| 13 | 336 | Benny Fry | Center | Houston | |
| 14 | 362 | Jim Gallagher | Linebacker | Yale | |
| 15 | 388 | Jeff Wright | Safety | Minnesota | |
| 16 | 413 | Greg Edmonds | Wide receiver | Penn State | Originally 49ers pick (Note: The Vikings originally had 414th overall, but moved up to the 413th overall selection when the 49ers passed.) |
| 17 | 439 | Ken Duncan | Punter | Tulsa | Originally 49ers pick (Note: The Vikings originally had 440th overall, but moved up to the 439th overall selection when the Raiders passed on the 435th overall pick and allowed several teams to move up.) |

== Roster ==
1971 Minnesota Vikings roster
| Quarterbacks (QB): 15 Gary Cuozzo; 19 Bob Lee P; 16 Norm Snead; Running backs (RB): 30 Bill Brown; 26 Clinton Jones; 21 Jim Lindsey; 41 Dave Osborn; 32 Oscar Reed; Wide receivers (WR): 27 Bob Grim; 80 John Henderson; 84 Gene Washington; Tight ends (TE): 89 Robert Brown; 83 Stu Voigt | Offensive linemen (OL): 67 Grady Alderman T; 71 Doug Davis T; 68 Roy Schmidt G; 64 Milt Sunde G; 53 Mick Tingelhoff C; 62 Ed White G; 73 Ron Yary T; 51 Godfrey Zaunbrecher C; Defensive linemen (DL): 81 Carl Eller DE; 77 Gary Larsen DT; 70 Jim Marshall DE; 88 Alan Page DT; 69 Doug Sutherland DT; 72 John Ward DE | Linebackers (LB): 58 Wally Hilgenberg OLB; 56 Carl Gersbach MLB; 52 Noel Jenke OLB; 59 Lonnie Warwick MLB; 36 Chuck Winfrey OLB; 60 Roy Winston OLB; Defensive backs (DB): 20 Bobby Bryant CB; 29 Karl Kassulke SS; 22 Paul Krause FS; 45 Ed Sharockman CB; 40 Charlie West CB/SS; 23 Jeff Wright FS; Special teams (ST): 14 Fred Cox K | Practice squad: -- David Chapple P; 86 Al Denson WR; 44 Leo Hayden RB; -- Tom Lorenz TE; 75 Bob Lurtsema DT; 78 Jerry Patton DT; 43 Nate Wright CB; Reserve: 87 John Beasley TE (IR); -- Vince Clements RB (IR); 63 Jim Vellone G (IR); Rookies in italics 40 active, 10 reserve |

== Preseason ==
| Week | Date | Opponent | Result | Record | Venue | Attendance |
|---|---|---|---|---|---|---|
| 1 | August 8 | New England Patriots | W 17–10 | 1–0 | Memorial Stadium (Minneapolis) | 31,813 |
| 2 | August 14 | at San Diego Chargers | W 34–7 | 2–0 | San Diego Stadium | 49,267 |
| 3 | August 21 | Chicago Bears | W 34–14 | 3–0 | Metropolitan Stadium | 47,900 |
| 4 | August 28 | at Pittsburgh Steelers | W 26–21 | 4–0 | Three Rivers Stadium | 46,276 |
| 5 | September 4 | at Denver Broncos | L 7–14 | 4–1 | Mile High Stadium | 43,000 |
| 6 | September 11 | Miami Dolphins | W 24–0 | 5–1 | Metropolitan Stadium | 47,990 |

== Regular season ==
=== Schedule ===
| Week | Date | Opponent | Result | Record | Venue | Attendance |
|---|---|---|---|---|---|---|
| 1 | September 20 | at Detroit Lions | W 16–13 | 1–0 | Tiger Stadium | 54,418 |
| 2 | September 26 | Chicago Bears | L 17–20 | 1–1 | Metropolitan Stadium | 47,900 |
| 3 | October 3 | Buffalo Bills | W 19–0 | 2–1 | Metropolitan Stadium | 47,900 |
| 4 | October 10 | at Philadelphia Eagles | W 13–0 | 3–1 | Veterans Stadium | 65,358 |
| 5 | October 17 | at Green Bay Packers | W 24–13 | 4–1 | Lambeau Field | 56,263 |
| 6 | October 25 | Baltimore Colts | W 10–3 | 5–1 | Metropolitan Stadium | 49,784 |
| 7 | October 31 | at New York Giants | W 17–10 | 6–1 | Yankee Stadium | 62,829 |
| 8 | November 7 | San Francisco 49ers | L 9–13 | 6–2 | Metropolitan Stadium | 49,784 |
| 9 | November 14 | Green Bay Packers | W 3–0 | 7–2 | Metropolitan Stadium | 49,784 |
| 10 | November 21 | at New Orleans Saints | W 23–10 | 8–2 | Tulane Stadium | 83,130 |
| 11 | November 28 | Atlanta Falcons | W 24–7 | 9–2 | Metropolitan Stadium | 49,784 |
| 12 | December 5 | at San Diego Chargers | L 14–30 | 9–3 | San Diego Stadium | 54,505 |
| 13 | December 11 | Detroit Lions | W 29–10 | 10–3 | Metropolitan Stadium | 49,784 |
| 14 | December 19 | at Chicago Bears | W 27–10 | 11–3 | Soldier Field | 55,049 |

=== Game summaries ===
==== Week 6: vs. Baltimore Colts ====
Week 6: Baltimore Colts at Minnesota Vikings – Game summary

| Quarter | 1 | 2 | 3 | 4 | Total |
|---|---|---|---|---|---|
| Colts | 0 | 0 | 0 | 3 | 3 |
| Vikings | 7 | 0 | 3 | 0 | 10 |

at Metropolitan Stadium, Bloomington, Minnesota

- Date: October 25
- Game time: 8:00 p.m.
- Game weather: 53 °F (12 °C)
- Game attendance: 49,784
- TV: ABC
- Pro-Football-Reference.com

Game information

First quarter

- MIN – Dave Osborn 2-yard run (Fred Cox kick). Vikings 7–0.

Second quarter

- No scoring plays.

Third quarter

- MIN – Fred Cox 32-yard field goal. Vikings 10–0.

Fourth quarter

- BAL – Jim O'Brien 40-yard field goal. Vikings 10–3.

Top passers

- BAL – Earl Morrall – 16/27, 148 yards, 3 INT
- MIN – Gary Cuozzo – 7/15, 110 yards, INT

Top rushers

- BAL – Norm Bulaich – 18 rushes, 83 yards
- MIN – Dave Osborn – 13 rushes, 42 yards, TD

Top receivers

- BAL – Norm Bulaich – 6 receptions, 62 yards
- MIN – Stu Voigt – 3 receptions, 60 yards

=== Standings ===
NFC Central
| | W | L | T | PCT | DIV | CONF | PF | PA | STK |
|---|---|---|---|---|---|---|---|---|---|
| Minnesota Vikings | 11 | 3 | 0 | .786 | 5–1 | 9–2 | 245 | 139 | W2 |
| Detroit Lions | 7 | 6 | 1 | .538 | 2–3–1 | 3–6–1 | 341 | 286 | L2 |
| Chicago Bears | 6 | 8 | 0 | .429 | 2–4 | 5–6 | 185 | 276 | L5 |
| Green Bay Packers | 4 | 8 | 2 | .333 | 2–3–1 | 2–7–2 | 274 | 298 | L1 |

Note: Tie games were not officially counted in the standings until 1972.

== Postseason ==
| Round | Date | Opponent | Result | Venue | Attendance |
|---|---|---|---|---|---|
| Divisional | December 25 | Dallas Cowboys | L 12–20 | Metropolitan Stadium | 47,307 |

== Awards, records, and honors ==
=== All-Pros ===
First team

- OT Ron Yary (AP, NEA, PFWA, PFW)
- DE Carl Eller (AP, NEA, PFWA, PFW)
- DT Alan Page (AP, NEA, PFWA, PFW)
- S Paul Krause (NEA)

=== Pro Bowlers ===
- WR Bob Grim
- OT Ron Yary
- DE Carl Eller
- DT Alan Page
- S Paul Krause

=== League leaders ===
- Bob Lee – Most punts (89), most punting yards (3515)
- Charlie West – Longest interception return (89 yards)
- Alan Page – Most safeties (2)

== Statistics ==
=== Team leaders ===
| Category | Player(s) | Value |
|---|---|---|
| Passing yards | Gary Cuozzo | 842 |
| Passing touchdowns | Gary Cuozzo | 6 |
| Rushing yards | Clint Jones | 675 |
| Rushing touchdowns | Dave Osborn | 5 |
| Receiving yards | Bob Grim | 691 |
| Receiving touchdowns | Bob Grim | 7 |
| Points | Fred Cox | 91 |
| Kickoff return yards | Charlie West | 556 |
| Punt return yards | Charlie West | 94 |
| Interceptions | Charlie West | 7 |

=== League rankings ===
| Category | Total yards | Yards per game | NFL rank (out of 26) |
|---|---|---|---|
| Passing offense | 1,655 | 118.2 | 25th |
| Rushing offense | 1,695 | 121.1 | 17th |
| Total offense | 3,350 | 239.3 | 23rd |
| Passing defense | 1,806 | 129.0 | 3rd |
| Rushing defense | 1,600 | 114.3 | 6th |
| Total defense | 3,406 | 243.3 | 2nd |
