= Larry Shears =

American football player (born 1949)

No. 30
- Position: Defensive back

Personal information
- Born: August 1, 1949 (age 77); Mobile, Alabama, U.S.
- Listed height: 5 ft 10 in (1.78 m)
- Listed weight: 185 lb (84 kg)

Career information
- High school: Plateau (AL) Mobile County Training
- College: Lincoln (MO)
- NFL draft: 1971: 11th round, 267th overall pick

Career history
- Atlanta Falcons (1971–1972); New York Stars/Charlotte Hornets (1974); Charlotte Hornets (1975)
- Stats at Pro Football Reference

Larry Shears (born August 1, 1949) is an American former professional football player who was a defensive back for the Atlanta Falcons of the National Football League (NFL) from 1971 to 1972. He played college football for the Lincoln Blue Tigers.
