= Rick Ogle =

American football player (born 1949)

No. 52, 58
- Position: Linebacker

Personal information
- Born: January 14, 1949 (age 77); Bozeman, Montana, U.S.
- Listed height: 6 ft 3 in (1.91 m)
- Listed weight: 230 lb (104 kg)

Career information
- High school: Bozeman
- College: Colorado
- NFL draft: 1971: 11th round, 277th overall pick

Career history
- St. Louis Cardinals (1971); Detroit Lions (1972)
- Stats at Pro Football Reference

Richard James Ogle (born January 14, 1949) is an American former professional football player who was a linebacker in the National Football League (NFL). He played college football for the Colorado Buffaloes (1968–1970). He played in the NFL for the St. Louis Cardinals (1971) and Detroit Lions (1972). He appeared in a total of 10 NFL games, five as a starter.

== Early life ==
Ogle was born in 1949 in Bozeman, Montana, and attended Bozeman High School. He played college football for the Colorado Buffaloes from 1968 to 1970.

== Professional career ==
He was selected by the St. Louis Cardinals in the 11th round (277th overall pick) of the 1971 NFL draft. He appeared in six games for the Cardinals in 1971, five of them as a starter. In September 1972, he was traded to the Detroit Lions in exchange for running back Paul Gipson. He appeared in four games for the Lions in 1972.
