= Sam Holden =

American football player (born 1947)

No. 70
- Position: Tackle

Personal information
- Born: February 24, 1947 (age 79); Magnolia, Mississippi, U.S.
- Listed height: 6 ft 3 in (1.91 m)
- Listed weight: 258 lb (117 kg)

Career information
- High school: St. Augustine (New Orleans, Louisiana)
- College: Southern Illinois; Grambling State
- NFL draft: 1971: 2nd round, 31st overall pick

Career history
- New Orleans Saints (1971)

Career NFL statistics
- Games played: 9
- Stats at Pro Football Reference

Samuel Lee Holden Jr. (born February 24, 1947) is an American former professional football player who was a tackle for the New Orleans Saints of the National Football League (NFL). He played college football for the Grambling State Tigers.
