= 1972 Pro Bowl =

National Football League all-star game

1972 NFL Pro Bowl
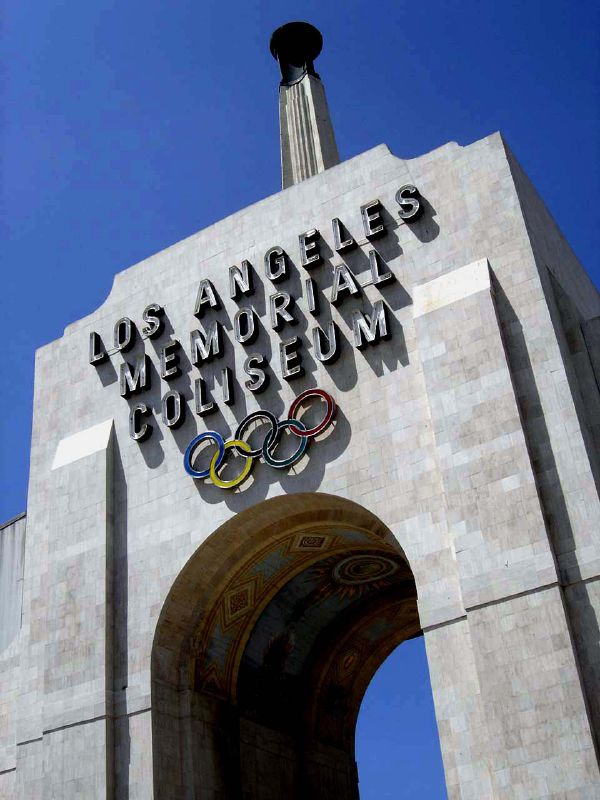
- The front of the L.A. Memorial Coliseum
NFC	AFC
13	26
Head coach: Dick Nolan (San Francisco 49ers)	Head coach: Don McCafferty (Baltimore Colts)
	1	2	3	4	Total
NFC	0	6	0	7	13
AFC	0	3	13	10	26
- Date: January 23, 1972
- Stadium: Los Angeles Memorial Coliseum; Los Angeles, California
- Co-MVPs: Jan Stenerud (Kansas City Chiefs, K), Willie Lanier (Kansas City Chiefs, LB)
- Referee: Ben Dreith
- Attendance: 53,647

TV in the United States
- Network: NBC
- Announcers: Curt Gowdy, Al DeRogatis

The 1972 Pro Bowl was the NFL's 22nd annual all-star game which featured the outstanding performers from the 1971 season. The game was played on January 23, 1972, at Los Angeles Memorial Coliseum in Los Angeles, California. The final score was AFC 26, NFC 13.

The Kansas City Chiefs swept the Most Valuable Player (MVP) awards, with placekicker Jan Stenerud named the game's offensive MVP and Willie Lanier selected as the defensive MVP.

This was the last NFL game overall played with the hashmarks (also called the inbound lines) set at 40 feet apart (20 yards from the sidelines); the next season, they were brought in to 18½ feet, the width of the goalposts, where they still stand to this day.

Attendance at the game was 53,647. Don McCafferty of the Baltimore Colts coached the AFC while the NFC was led by the San Francisco 49ers' Dick Nolan. The referee was Ben Dreith.

== AFC roster ==
=== Offense ===
Position	Starter(s)	Reserve(s)
Quarterback	12 Bob Griese, Miami	16 Len Dawson, Kansas City
Running back	44 Floyd Little, Denver	36 Norm Bulaich, Baltimore; 44 Leroy Kelly, Cleveland
Fullback	39 Larry Csonka, Miami	44 Marv Hubbard, Oakland
Wide receivers	89 Otis Taylor, Kansas City; 42 Paul Warfield, Miami	25 Fred Biletnikoff, Oakland; 27 Gary Garrison, San Diego
Tight end	87 Raymond Chester, Oakland	89 Milt Morin, Cleveland
Offensive tackle	77 Jim Tyrer, Kansas City; 75 Winston Hill, N.Y. Jets	76 Bob Brown, Oakland; 72 Bob Vogel, Baltimore
Offensive guard	66 Larry Little, Miami; 78 Walt Sweeney, San Diego	71 Ed Budde, Kansas City
Center	50 Bill Curry, Baltimore	00 Jim Otto, Oakland

=== Defense ===
Position	Starter(s)	Reserve(s)
Defensive end	65 Elvin Bethea, Houston; 78 Bubba Smith, Baltimore	84 Bill Stanfill, Miami
Defensive tackle	86 Buck Buchanan, Kansas City; 75 Joe Greene, Pittsburgh	61 Curley Culp, Kansas City
Outside linebacker	78 Bobby Bell, Kansas City; 83 Ted Hendricks, Baltimore	34 Andy Russell, Pittsburgh
Inside linebacker	63 Willie Lanier, Kansas City	32 Mike Curtis, Baltimore
Cornerback	24 Willie Brown, Oakland; 18 Emmitt Thomas, Kansas City	20 Lemar Parrish, Cincinnati
Free safety	21 Rick Volk, Baltimore	13 Jake Scott, Miami
Strong safety	29 Ken Houston, Houston	20 Jerry Logan, Baltimore

=== Special teams ===
Position	Starter(s)	Reserve(s)
Punter	44 Jerrel Wilson, Kansas City	
Placekicker	3 Jan Stenerud, Kansas City	
Kick returner	22 Mercury Morris, Miami	

== NFC roster ==
=== Offense ===
Position	Starter(s)	Reserve(s)
Quarterback	12 Roger Staubach, Dallas	11 Greg Landry, Detroit
Running back	43 Larry Brown, Washington	33 Willie Ellison, Los Angeles; 22 Vic Washington, San Francisco
Fullback	42 John Brockington, Green Bay	36 Steve Owens, Detroit
Wide receivers	45 Dick Gordon, Chicago; 18 Gene Washington, San Francisco	27 Bob Grim, Minnesota; 80 Roy Jefferson, Washington
Tight end	88 Charlie Sanders, Detroit	82 Ted Kwalick, San Francisco
Offensive tackle	75 George Kunz, Atlanta; 73 Ron Yary, Minnesota	70 Rayfield Wright, Dallas
Offensive guard	68 Gale Gillingham, Green Bay; 76 John Niland, Dallas	65 Tom Mack, Los Angeles
Center	75 Forrest Blue, San Francisco	54 Ed Flanagan, Detroit

=== Defense ===
Position	Starter(s)	Reserve(s)
Defensive end	86 Cedrick Hardman, Dallas; 87 Claude Humphrey, Atlanta	81 Carl Eller, Minnesota
Defensive tackle	74 Bob Lilly, San Francisco; 88 Alan Page, Minnesota	74 Merlin Olsen, Los Angeles
Outside linebacker	54 Chuck Howley, Dallas; 64 Dave Wilcox, San Francisco	58 Isiah Robertson, Los Angeles
Inside linebacker	51 Dick Butkus, Chicago	53 Mike Lucci, Detroit
Cornerback	37 Jimmy Johnson, San Francisco; 44 Bruce Taylor, San Francisco	20 Mel Renfro, Dallas; 22 Roger Wehrli, St. Louis
Free safety	28 Bill Bradley, Philadelphia	22 Paul Krause, Minnesota
Strong safety	34 Cornell Green, Dallas	20 Jerry Logan, Baltimore

=== Special teams ===
Position	Starter(s)	Reserve(s)
Punter	10 Ron Widby, Dallas	
Placekicker	5 Curt Knight, Washington	
Kick returner	45 Speedy Duncan, Washington	
