= Ron Cardo =

American football player and coach (born 1946)

Biographical details
- Born: January 21, 1946 (age 80); Milwaukee, Wisconsin, U.S.

Playing career
- 1967–1970: Wisconsin–Oshkosh
- 1971: San Francisco 49ers*
- Position: Running back

Coaching career (HC unless noted)
- 1976–1983: Wisconsin–River Falls (assistant)
- 1984–1999: Wisconsin–Oshkosh

Head coaching record
- Overall: 58–98–4

Ronald Harold Cardo (born January 21, 1946) is an American former football player and coach. He was selected in the tenth round by the San Francisco 49ers in the 1971 NFL draft. Cardo served as the head football coach at his alma mater, the University of Wisconsin–Oshkosh, from 1984 to 1999, compiling a record of 58–98–4.
