= Don Morrison (American football) =

American football player (1949–2025)

No. 76, 79, 62
- Position: Tackle

Personal information
- Born: December 16, 1949; Fort Worth, Texas, U.S.
- Died: September 1, 2025 (aged 75)
- Listed height: 6 ft 5 in (1.96 m)
- Listed weight: 255 lb (116 kg)

Career information
- High school: Forney (Forney, Texas)
- College: Texas-Arlington
- NFL draft: 1971: 4th round, 98th overall pick

Career history
- New Orleans Saints (1971–1977); Baltimore Colts (1978); Detroit Lions (1979)

Career NFL statistics
- Games played: 123
- Games started: 95
- Fumble recoveries: 5
- Stats at Pro Football Reference

Don Alan Morrison (December 16, 1949 – September 1, 2025) was an American professional football player who was an offensive tackle in the National Football League (NFL) for the New Orleans Saints, Baltimore Colts, and Detroit Lions. He played college football for the Texas-Arlington Mavericks.

== College career ==
Morrison played college football at the University of Texas at Arlington, where he was a two-time honorable mention All-American. Morrison also competed in javelin, shot put, and discus for the track team. He was inducted into the school's Hall of Honor in 2018.

== Personal life ==
Following his football career, Morrison worked as a fireman for 20 years and then as a financial planner and constable. Morrison died on September 1, 2025, at the age of 75.
