= Coleman Zeno =

American football player (born 1946)

No. 88
- Position: Wide receiver

Personal information
- Born: November 18, 1946 (age 79); New Orleans, Louisiana, U.S.
- Died: December 27, 2016
- Listed height: 6 ft 4 in (1.93 m)
- Listed weight: 210 lb (95 kg)

Career information
- High school: Lincoln (Marrero, Louisiana)
- College: Grambling State
- NFL draft: 1971: 17th round, 434th overall pick

Career history
- New York Giants (1971)

Career NFL statistics
- Games played: 2
- Receptions: 5
- Receiving yards: 97
- Touchdowns: 0
- Stats at Pro Football Reference

Joseph Coleman Zeno Jr. (born November 18, 1946) is an American former professional football player who was a wide receiver for the New York Giants of the National Football League (NFL) in 1971. He played college football for the Grambling State Tigers.

Zeno also ran track at Grambling State. He was selected 434th overall by the New York Giants in the 17th round of the 1971 NFL draft. Zeno caught three touchdowns in the preseason and earned a place on the practice squad, where he spent seven weeks focusing on learning the routes.

Zeno was elevated to the main roster in November 1971 after the Giants were left with just two receivers. He made his NFL debut against the San Diego Chargers, recording four receptions for 90 yards, and even caught a touchdown pass which was called back due to a penalty. "I was nervous," he said, "I knew I'd play, but not this much." Giants quarterback Fran Tarkenton opined that Zeno had "as much big play potential as Homer Jones." Zeno earned the start the following week against the Atlanta Falcons and recorded one reception for seven yards. However, he broke his left arm in a collision with Bennie McRae during practice on November 17, ending his season.
