= Dee Martin =

American football player (born 1949)

No. 22
- Position: Cornerback

Personal information
- Born: March 28, 1949 (age 77); New Orleans, Louisiana, U.S.
- Listed height: 6 ft 1 in (1.85 m)
- Listed weight: 190 lb (86 kg)

Career information
- High school: Carver (New Orleans)
- College: Kentucky State (1967–1970)
- NFL draft: 1971: 4th round, 91st overall pick

Career history
- New Orleans Saints (1971)
- Stats at Pro Football Reference

D'Artagnan Athos Martin (born March 28, 1949) is an American former professional football cornerback who played one season with the New Orleans Saints of the National Football League (NFL). He was selected by the Saints in the fourth round of the 1971 NFL draft after playing college football at Kentucky State College.

== Early life ==
D'Artagnan Athos Martin was born on March 28, 1949, in New Orleans, Louisiana. He attended George Washington Carver Senior High School in New Orleans, Louisiana.

== College career ==
Martin played college football for the Kentucky State Thorobreds of Kentucky State College from 1967 to 1970. He was named an All-American by the Pittsburgh Courier. He recorded 22 interceptions during his college career. He was inducted into the school's athletics hall of fame in 2006.

== Professional career ==
Martin was selected by the New Orleans Saints in the fourth round, with the 91st overall pick, of the 1971 NFL draft. He started all 14 games at left cornerback for the Saints during his rookie year in 1971, totaling three interceptions, one fumble, and two fumble recoveries. The Saints finished the season with a 4–8–2 record. He was placed on injured reserve on September 13, 1972, and spent the entire 1972 season there. Martin was released by the Saints on July 16, 1973.
