= Dennis Coleman =

American football player (born 1948)

No. 53, 41
- Position: Linebacker

Personal information
- Born: December 19, 1948 (age 77); Aberdeen, Mississippi, U.S.
- Listed height: 6 ft 4 in (1.93 m)
- Listed weight: 225 lb (102 kg)

Career information
- High school: Aberdeen
- College: Mississippi (1967–1970)
- NFL draft: 1971: 6th round, 151st overall pick

Career history
- Miami Dolphins (1971)*; New England Patriots (1971); Calgary Stampeders (1972–1973)
- * Offseason or practice squad member only

Awards and highlights
- First-team All-SEC (1970)
- Stats at Pro Football Reference

Dennis Franklin Coleman (born December 19, 1948) is an American former professional football linebacker who played one season with the New England Patriots of the National Football League (NFL). He played college football at Mississippi and was selected by the Miami Dolphins in the sixth round of the 1971 NFL draft. He was also a member of the Calgary Stampeders of the Canadian Football League.

== Early life and college ==
Dennis Franklin Coleman was born on December 19, 1948, in Aberdeen, Mississippi. He attended Aberdeen High School in Aberdeen.

He was a member of the Ole Miss Rebels from 1967 to 1970, and a three-year letterman from 1968 to 1970. He was named first-team All-SEC by both the Associated Press and United Press International his senior year in 1970.

== Professional career ==
Coleman was selected by the Miami Dolphins in the sixth round, with the 151st overall pick, of the 1971 NFL draft. He was released by the Dolphins later in 1971.

Coleman signed with the New England Patriots in 1971 and played in nine games for the team during the 1971 season. He was released by the Patriots in 1972.

He played in eight games for the Calgary Stampeders of the Canadian Football League in 1972, recovering two fumbles for 24 yards and a touchdown. He played in five games for the Stampeders in 1973. Coleman was listed as a linebacker/defensive end during his time with the Stampeders.
