= Dale Farley =

American football player (1949–2019)

No. 58, 57
- Position: Linebacker

Personal information
- Born: September 27, 1949; Sparta, Tennessee, U.S.
- Died: June 13, 2019 (aged 69); Cookeville, Tennessee, U.S.
- Listed height: 6 ft 3 in (1.91 m)
- Listed weight: 225 lb (102 kg)

Career information
- College: West Virginia
- NFL draft: 1971: 3rd round, 74th overall pick

Career history
- Miami Dolphins (1971); Buffalo Bills (1972–1973)

Awards and highlights
- All-American (1970); First-team All-East (1970)

Career NFL statistics
- Fumble recoveries: 1
- Interceptions: 1
- Stats at Pro Football Reference

Dale Rice Farley (May 27, 1949 – June 13, 2019) was an American professional football player who was a linebacker for the Buffalo Bills and Miami Dolphins of the National Football League (NFL). He played college football for the West Virginia Mountaineers.
