= Carlos Bell =

American football player (born 1947)

No. 34
- Positions: Running back, fullback, tight end

Personal information
- Born: September 21, 1947 (age 79); Clinton, Oklahoma, U.S.
- Listed height: 6 ft 5 in (1.96 m)
- Listed weight: 238 lb (108 kg)

Career information
- High school: Clinton (OK)
- College: Houston
- NFL draft: 1971: 4th round, 82nd overall pick

Career history
- Richmond Roadrunners/Richmond Saints (1969-1970); New Orleans Saints (1971)
- Stats at Pro Football Reference

Carlos R. Bell (born September 21, 1947) is an American former professional football running back, fullback, and tight end who played one season in the National Football League (NFL) for the New Orleans Saints in 1971. He also played for the Richmond Roadrunners/Saints of the Atlantic Coast Football League (ACFL).

== Early life ==
Bell was born on September 21, 1947, in Clinton, Oklahoma. He went to high school at Clinton (OK).

== College career ==
Bell went to college at Houston. In 1967 he had 14 rushes for 139 yards and 2 touchdowns. In 1968 he had 107 rushes for 691 yards and 5 touchdowns.

=== Career college statistics ===
Year	Games	Att	Yds	Avg	TD	Rec	RecYds	RecAvg	RecTD
1967	10	14	139	9.9	2	1	30	30.0	0
1968	10	107	691	6.5	5	2	26	13.0	1
Career	20	121	830	6.9	7	3	56	18.7	1

== Professional career ==
=== Richmond Roadrunner/Saints ===
Bell had his first season in 1969. He was with the Richmond Roadrunners of the Atlantic Coast Football League. He scored two touchdowns in 1969. In 1970, the Roadrunners were renamed the Saints. With the Saints he had 113 rushes for 449 yards and two touchdowns. He also had 13 receptions for 148 yards and two touchdowns. He scored 6 touchdowns with the Roadrunners/Saints.

=== New Orleans Saints ===
In 1971, Bell was drafted in the fourth round (82nd overall) by the New Orleans Saints. He played in one game for them. He played as a tight end. He did not play anymore after 1971.

=== Career Professional statistics ===
Year	Games	Att	Yds	Avg	TD	Rec	RecYds	RecAvg	RecTD
1969					2				
1970		113	449	4.0	2	13	148	11.4	2
1971	1	0	0	0.0	0	0	0	0	0
Career					4				2
