= Matt Maslowski =

American football player (born 1949)

No. 48, 46
- Position: Wide receiver

Personal information
- Born: September 10, 1949 (age 77); Chicago, Illinois, U.S.
- Listed height: 6 ft 3 in (1.91 m)
- Listed weight: 210 lb (95 kg)

Career information
- High school: Mission Bay (San Diego, California)
- College: San Diego
- NFL draft: 1971: undrafted

Career history
- Los Angeles Rams (1971); Chicago Bears (1972); Minnesota Vikings (1973)*; Florida Blazers (1974)
- * Offseason or practice squad member only

Career NFL statistics
- Receptions: 3
- Receiving yards: 82
- Receiving TDs: 1
- Stats at Pro Football Reference

Matthew Anthony Maslowski (born September 10, 1949) is an American former professional football player who was a wide receiver for the Los Angeles Rams and Chicago Bears of the National Football League (NFL). He also played for Florida Blazers of the (WFL). He played college football for the San Diego Toreros.

== Personal life ==
Maslowski is of Polish descent.
