= Bob Thomas (running back) =

American football player (born 1948)

Bobby Thomas
No. 35
- Position: Running back

Personal information
- Born: October 23, 1948 (age 78); Pittsburgh, Pennsylvania, U.S.
- Listed height: 5 ft 10 in (1.78 m)
- Listed weight: 201 lb (91 kg)

Career information
- High school: Centennial (Compton, California)
- College: Arizona State
- NFL draft: 1971: 15th round, 379th overall pick

Career history
- Los Angeles Rams (1971–1972); San Diego Chargers (1973–1974)

Career NFL statistics
- Rushing attempts: 120
- Rushing yards: 537
- Total TDs: 4
- Stats at Pro Football Reference

Robert Lee Thomas (born August 23, 1948) is an American former professional football player who was a running back in the National Football League (NFL) for the Los Angeles Rams and San Diego Chargers. He played college football for the Arizona State Sun Devils.
