= Ron Kadziel =

American football player (born 1949)

No. 52
- Position: Linebacker

Personal information
- Born: February 27, 1949 (age 77); Pomona, California, U.S.
- Listed height: 6 ft 4 in (1.93 m)
- Listed weight: 230 lb (104 kg)

Career information
- High school: Pomona Catholic
- College: Stanford
- NFL draft: 1971: 5th round, 129th overall pick

Career history
- Dallas Cowboys (1971)*; New England Patriots (1972)
- * Offseason or practice squad member only

Awards and highlights
- Super Bowl champion (VI)

Career NFL statistics
- Games played: 14
- Stats at Pro Football Reference

Ronald Dennis Kadziel (born February 27, 1949) is an American former professional football player who was a linebacker for the New England Patriots of the National Football League (NFL). He played college football for the Stanford Cardinal.

== Early life ==
Kadziel attended Pomona Catholic High School, where he practiced football and baseball. He was selected as a catcher by the Minnesota Twins after graduation, but turned down the signing bonus to play college football.

He accepted a football scholarship from Stanford University. He was a backup tight end as a sophomore and junior.

As a senior, he was converted into a linebacker. He became a starter, posting 56 tackles and 2 interceptions, even though he was limited with a pulled thigh muscle that he suffered in mid-season.

== Professional career ==
Kadziel was selected by the Dallas Cowboys in the fifth round (129th overall) of the 1971 NFL draft. He was waived on September 7.

On March 8, 1972, he signed as a free agent with the New England Patriots. He started the season opener at weakside linebacker against the Cincinnati Bengals, but was demoted afterwards in favor of Ron Acks. On July 23, 1973, he announced his retirement from professional football.
