= Wayne Walton =

American football player (born 1948)

No. 78, 72
- Positions: Tackle, guard

Personal information
- Born: October 15, 1948 (age 78); Waco, Texas, U.S.
- Listed height: 6 ft 5 in (1.96 m)
- Listed weight: 255 lb (116 kg)

Career information
- High school: Azle (Azle, Texas)
- College: Abilene Christian
- NFL draft: 1971: 2nd round, 44th overall pick

Career history
- New York Giants (1971); Kansas City Chiefs (1973–1974)
- Stats at Pro Football Reference

Wayne Walton (born October 15, 1948) is an American former professional football tackle and guard. He played for the New York Giants in 1971 and the Kansas City Chiefs from 1973 to 1974.
