= Don Burchfield =

American football player (born 1949)

No. 36
- Position: Tight end

Personal information
- Born: March 17, 1949 (age 77); Indianapolis, Indiana, U.S.
- Listed height: 6 ft 3 in (1.91 m)
- Listed weight: 233 lb (106 kg)

Career information
- High school: Southport
- College: Ball State
- NFL draft: 1971: 13th round, 314th overall pick

Career history
- New Orleans Saints (1971); San Francisco 49ers (1973)*; Chicago Fire (1974); Chicago Winds (1975)
- * Offseason or practice squad member only

Career NFL statistics
- Receptions: 3
- Receiving yards: 36
- Touchdowns: 0
- Stats at Pro Football Reference

Donald Lee Burchfield (born March 17, 1949) is an American former professional football player who was a tight end for the New Orleans Saints of National Football League (NFL). He played college football for the Ball State University.
