= 1971 Miami Dolphins season =

6th season in franchise history; first Super Bowl appearance and loss

- Head coach: Don Shula
- Home stadium: Miami Orange Bowl

Results
- Record: 10–3–1
- Division place: 1st AFC East
- Playoffs: Won Divisional Playoffs (at Chiefs) 27–24 (2OT); Won AFC Championship (vs. Colts) 21–0; Lost Super Bowl VI (vs. Cowboys) 3–24
- Pro Bowlers: 7 QB Bob Griese; FS Jake Scott; DE Bill Stanfill; G Larry Little; WR Paul Warfield; RB Mercury Morris; FB Larry Csonka

The 1971 Miami Dolphins season was the team's sixth, and second in the National Football League (NFL). The team improved on their 10–4 record from 1970 and finished at 10–3–1 to win the first of four consecutive AFC East titles. They opened the season with a tie at Denver, split the next two, then won eight consecutive to improve to 9–1–1.

The Dolphins won their first division title, finishing first in the AFC East, and then defeated the Kansas City Chiefs in the divisional round in a second overtime (the game is considered the longest in NFL history by time). They advanced to their first AFC championship game and shut out the defending Super Bowl champion Baltimore Colts 21–0. However, in Super Bowl VI, Miami was walloped 24–3 by the Dallas Cowboys. After losing that Super Bowl, the Dolphins did not lose another game until week 2 of the 1973 season, going 32–2 (.941) overall in the next two seasons (1972, 1973), both ending with Super Bowl victories.

== Offseason ==
=== NFL draft ===
1971 Miami Dolphins draft
| Round | Pick | Player | Position | College | Notes |
| 2 | 47 | Otto Stowe | Wide receiver | Iowa State | |
| 3 | 74 | Dale Farley | Linebacker | West Virginia | |
| 4 | 99 | Joe Theismann * | Quarterback | Notre Dame | |
| 6 | 151 | Dennis Coleman | Linebacker | Mississippi | |
| 7 | 178 | Ron Dickerson | Defensive back | Kansas State | |
| 9 | 230 | Vern Den Herder | Defensive end | Central College (Iowa) | |
| 10 | 255 | Ron Maree | Defensive tackle | Purdue | |
| 11 | 282 | Vic Surma | Tackle | Penn State | |
| 12 | 307 | Leroy Byras | Running back | Alcorn A&M | |
| 13 | 333 | Lonnie Hepburn | Defensive back | Texas Southern | |
| 14 | 359 | David Vaughn | Tight end | Memphis State | |
| 15 | 386 | Bob Richards | Guard | California | |
| 16 | 410 | Chris Myers | Wide receiver | Kenyon | |
| 17 | 437 | Curt Mark | Linebacker | Mayville (ND) | |
Made roster * Made at least one Pro Bowl during career

== Personnel ==
=== Staff ===
1971 Miami Dolphins staff
| Front office: President – Joe Robbie; Vice president – Don Shula; Director of player personnel – Joe Thomas; Head coaches: Head coach – Don Shula; Offensive coaches: Offense/receivers – Howard Schnellenberger; Offensive backs – Carl Taseff; Offensive line – Monte Clark | Defensive coaches: Defense/linebackers – Bill Arnsparger; Defensive line – Mike Scarry; Defensive backs – Tom Keane |

=== Roster ===
1971 Miami Dolphins roster
| Quarterbacks (QB): 12 Bob Griese; 10 George Mira; Running backs (RB): 31 Terry Cole; 39 Larry Csonka; 32 Hubert Ginn; 21 Jim Kiick; 15 Charles Leigh; 22 Mercury Morris; Wide receivers (WR): 89 Karl Noonan; 82 Otto Stowe; 81 Howard Twilley; 42 Paul Warfield; Tight ends (TE): 80 Marv Fleming; 88 Jim Mandich | Offensive linemen (OL): 77 Doug Crusan T; 61 Bob DeMarco C; 73 Norm Evans T; 67 Bob Kuechenberg G; 62 Jim Langer C/G; 66 Larry Little G; 79 Wayne Moore T; Defensive linemen (DL): 71 Frank Cornish DT; 86 Vern Den Herder DE; 75 Manny Fernandez DT; 72 Bob Heinz DT/DE; 70 Jim Riley DE; 84 Bill Stanfill DE | Linebackers (LB): 85 Nick Buoniconti MLB; 57 Mike Kolen OLB; 53 Bob Matheson OLB; 56 Jesse Powell OLB; 59 Doug Swift OLB; Defensive backs (DB): 40 Dick Anderson SS; 25 Tim Foley CB; 45 Curtis Johnson CB; 26 Lloyd Mumphord CB; 48 Bob Petrella SS; 13 Jake Scott FS; Special teams (ST): 20 Larry Seiple P; 1 Garo Yepremian K | Practice squad: 24 Jack Clancy WR; 11 Jim Del Gaizo QB; 76 Bill Griffin T; 49 Ray Jones CB; 78 Wayne Mass G; 35 Stan Mitchell RB; 65 Maulty Moore DT; Reserve: 41 Ron Dickerson CB (IR); 58 Dale Farley LB (IR); 74 John Richardson DT (IR); Rookies in italics |

== Schedule ==
| Week | Date | Opponent | Result | Record | Game Site | Attendance | Recap |
|---|---|---|---|---|---|---|---|
| 1 | September 19 | at Denver Broncos | **T** 10–10 | 0–0–1 | Mile High Stadium | 51,228 | |
| 2 | September 26 | **at Buffalo Bills** | **W** 29–14 | 1–0–1 | War Memorial Stadium | 45,139 | |
| 3 | October 3 | **New York Jets** | **L** 10–14 | 1–1–1 | Miami Orange Bowl | 70,670 | |
| 4 | October 10 | at Cincinnati Bengals | **W** 23–13 | 2–1–1 | Riverfront Stadium | 60,099 | |
| 5 | October 17 | **New England Patriots** | **W** 41–3 | 3–1–1 | Miami Orange Bowl | 58,822 | |
| 6 | October 24 | **at New York Jets** | **W** 30–14 | 4–1–1 | Shea Stadium | 62,130 | |
| 7 | October 31 | at Los Angeles Rams | **W** 20–14 | 5–1–1 | Los Angeles Memorial Coliseum | 72,903 | |
| 8 | November 7 | **Buffalo Bills** | **W** 34–0 | 6–1–1 | Miami Orange Bowl | 61,016 | |
| 9 | November 14 | Pittsburgh Steelers | **W** 24–21 | 7–1–1 | Miami Orange Bowl | 66,435 | |
| 10 | November 21 | **Baltimore Colts** | **W** 17–14 | 8–1–1 | Miami Orange Bowl | 75,312 | |
| 11 | November 29 | Chicago Bears | **W** 34–3 | 9–1–1 | Miami Orange Bowl | 75,312 | |
| 12 | December 5 | **at New England Patriots** | **L** 13–34 | 9–2–1 | Schaefer Stadium | 61,457 | |
| 13 | December 11 | **at Baltimore Colts** | **L** 3–14 | 9–3–1 | Memorial Stadium | 60,238 | |
| 14 | December 19 | Green Bay Packers | **W** 27–6 | 10–3–1 | Miami Orange Bowl | 76,812 | |
Note: Intra-division opponents are in **bold** text.

Monday (November 29), Saturday (December 11)

=== Game summaries ===
==== Week 2 ====
| Team | 1 | 2 | 3 | 4 | Total |
|---|---|---|---|---|---|
| • Dolphins | 3 | 9 | 7 | 10 | 29 |
| Bills | 7 | 0 | 7 | 0 | 14 |

- Date: September 26
- Location: War Memorial Stadium
- Game start: 1:00 p.m. EST
- Game weather: 54 °F (12 °C) • Wind 11 mph (18 km/h)
- Referee: Dick Jorgensen

Scoring summary
| 1 | MIA | Garo Yepremian 15 yard field goal | Dolphins 3–0 |
| 1 | BUF | Wayne Patrick 1 yard run (Grant Guthrie kick) | Bills 7–3 |
| 2 | MIA | Garo Yepremian 46 yard field goal | Bills 7–6 |
| 2 | MIA | Garo Yepremian 13 yard field goal | Dolphins 9–7 |
| 2 | MIA | Garo Yepremian 9 yard field goal | Dolphins 12–7 |
| 3 | MIA | Larry Csonka 1 yard run (Garo Yepremian kick) | Dolphins 19–7 |
| 3 | BUF | O.J. Simpson 46 yard run (Grant Guthrie kick) | Dolphins 19–14 |
| 4 | MIA | Paul Warfield 23 yard pass from Bob Griese (Garo Yepremian kick) | Dolphins 26–14 |
| 4 | MIA | Garo Yepremian 48 yard field goal | Dolphins 29–14 |

=== Standings ===
AFC East
| | W | L | T | PCT | DIV | CONF | PF | PA | STK |
|---|---|---|---|---|---|---|---|---|---|
| Miami Dolphins | 10 | 3 | 1 | .769 | 5–3 | 7–3–1 | 315 | 174 | W1 |
| Baltimore Colts | 10 | 4 | 0 | .714 | 6–2 | 8–3 | 313 | 140 | L1 |
| New England Patriots | 6 | 8 | 0 | .429 | 4–4 | 6–5 | 238 | 325 | W1 |
| New York Jets | 6 | 8 | 0 | .429 | 4–4 | 6–5 | 212 | 299 | W2 |
| Buffalo Bills | 1 | 13 | 0 | .071 | 1–7 | 1–10 | 184 | 394 | L3 |

Note: Tie games were not officially counted in the standings until 1972.

== Postseason ==
=== Schedule ===
| Round | Date | Opponent | Result | Record | Venue | Attendance |
|---|---|---|---|---|---|---|
| Divisional | December 25 | at Kansas City Chiefs | W 27–24 (2OT) | 1–0 | Municipal Stadium | 45,822 |
| AFC Championship | January 2, 1972 | Baltimore Colts | W 21–0 | 2–0 | Orange Bowl | 76,622 |
| Super Bowl VI | January 16, 1972 | Dallas Cowboys | L 3–24 | 2–1 | Tulane Stadium | 80,591 |

=== AFC Divisional Playoff ===
Miami Dolphins 27 K.C. Chiefs 24 (20T)

=== AFC Championship Game ===
Miami Dolphins 21 Baltimore Colts 0

=== Super Bowl VI ===
Dallas Cowboys 24 Miami Dolphins 3

==== Scoring summary ====
- Dallas Mike Clark, FG 14 yds (3–0)
- Dallas L.Alworth, 9 yd pass from Staubach (Mike Clark kick, 10–0)
- Miami Yepremian, FG 23 yds (10–3)
- Dallas Duane Thomas, 5 yd run (Mike Clark kick, 17–3)
- Dallas Mike Ditka, 4 yd pass from Staubach (Mike Clark kick, 3–24)
