= Joe Sweet =

American football player (born 1948)

Joe Sweet (born July 5, 1948) is a former professional wide receiver for the Los Angeles Rams

Sweet attended Rochelle High School in Lakeland, Florida. In college he attended Tennessee State University.
