= 1970 NAIA Division I football season =

American college football season

- Regular season: August–November 1970
- Postseason: November 28–December 12, 1970
- National Championship: Sirrine Stadium; Greenville, SC
- Champions: Texas A&I (3)

The 1970 NAIA Division I football season was the 15th season of college football sponsored by the NAIA. It was also the first of twenty-seven seasons that the NAIA split its football competition into two separate championships.

The season was played from August to November 1970 and culminated in the 1970 NAIA Champion Bowl, played on December 12, 1970 at Sirrine Stadium in Greenville, South Carolina.

Texas A&I defeated Wofford in the Champion Bowl, 48–7, to win their third NAIA national title.

== Conference realignment ==
=== Membership changes ===
Team	1969 conference	1970 conference
Eastern Oregon	Oregon	Evergreen
Oregon College	Oregon	Evergreen
Oregon Tech	Oregon	Evergreen
Southern Oregon	Oregon	Evergreen

== Conference standings ==
1970 Arkansas Intercollegiate Conference football standings
	Conf.					Overall
Team	W		L		T	W		L		T
No. 15 Ouachita Baptist +	5	–	1	–	0	8	–	2	–	0
Arkansas Tech +	5	–	1	–	0	8	–	3	–	0
Southern Arkansas	4	–	2	–	0	5	–	5	–	0
Harding	3	–	3	–	0	5	–	5	–	0
Henderson State	2	–	4	–	0	5	–	5	–	0
State College of Arkansas	1	–	5	–	0	2	–	8	–	0
Arkansas A&M	1	–	5	–	0	1	–	9	–	0
+ – Conference co-champions; Rankings from NAIA Division I poll

1970 Carolinas Conference football standings
	Conf.					Overall
Team	W		L		T	W		L		T
Presbyterian $	5	–	0	–	0	8	–	3	–	0
Lenoir Rhyne	4	–	1	–	0	7	–	4	–	0
Catawba	2	–	3	–	0	5	–	5	–	0
Elon	2	–	3	–	0	3	–	7	–	0
Newberry	1	–	4	–	0	4	–	7	–	0
Guilford	1	–	4	–	0	2	–	8	–	0
$ – Conference champion

1970 Central Intercollegiate Athletic Association football standings
	Conf.					Overall
Team	W		L		T	W		L		T
Northern
Morgan State x	5	–	0	–	0	8	–	2	–	0
No. 16 Virginia State y$	5	–	1	–	0	8	–	2	–	0
Delaware State	4	–	1	–	0	6	–	2	–	0
Howard	3	–	2	–	0	7	–	2	–	0
Saint Paul's (VA)	1	–	1	–	0	3	–	5	–	0
Norfolk State	2	–	3	–	0	3	–	6	–	0
Virginia Union	1	–	4	–	0	3	–	6	–	0
Maryland Eastern Shore	1	–	5	–	0	1	–	8	–	0
Hampton	0	–	5	–	0	0	–	9	–	0
Southern
No. 17 Johnson C. Smith xy	6	–	0	–	0	8	–	2	–	0
Elizabeth City State	4	–	1	–	0	6	–	3	–	0
North Carolina Central	3	–	1	–	0	5	–	4	–	0
Shaw	3	–	2	–	1	3	–	5	–	1
Fayetteville State	1	–	3	–	1	3	–	5	–	1
Livingstone	1	–	4	–	0	2	–	7	–	0
Winston-Salem State	1	–	5	–	0	3	–	5	–	0
North Carolina A&T	0	–	3	–	0	4	–	6	–	0
Championship: Virginia State 32, Johnson C. Smith 14
$ – Conference champion; x – Division champion/co-champions; y – Championship game participant; Rankings from NAIA Division I poll

1970 Evergreen Conference football standings
	Conf.					Overall
Team	W		L		T	W		L		T
Central Washington $	5	–	0	–	0	7	–	3	–	0
Western Washington	5	–	1	–	0	5	–	5	–	0
Oregon College	4	–	2	–	0	5	–	5	–	0
Eastern Washington	3	–	4	–	0	4	–	6	–	0
Eastern Oregon	2	–	3	–	0	5	–	4	–	0
Whitworth	2	–	3	–	0	2	–	7	–	0
Southern Oregon	1	–	5	–	0	1	–	9	–	0
Oregon Tech	0	–	4	–	0	0	–	9	–	0
$ – Conference champion

1970 Lone Star Conference football standings
	Conf.					Overall
Team	W		L		T	W		L		T
No. 1/7 Texas A&I $^	8	–	1	–	0	11	–	1	–	0
No. NR / T–20 Sam Houston State	7	–	2	–	0	8	–	2	–	1
Sul Ross	6	–	3	–	0	7	–	3	–	0
Angelo State	6	–	3	–	0	6	–	4	–	0
Southwest Texas State	4	–	5	–	0	6	–	5	–	0
Howard Payne	4	–	5	–	0	5	–	5	–	0
East Texas State	4	–	5	–	0	5	–	6	–	0
McMurry	4	–	5	–	0	5	–	6	–	0
Tarleton State	1	–	8	–	0	1	–	8	–	0
Stephen F. Austin	1	–	8	–	0	1	–	9	–	0
$ – Conference champion; ^ – NAIA Division I playoff participant; Rankings from NAIA Division I poll and AP small college poll

1970 Mid-South Athletic Conference football standings
	Conf.					Overall
Team	W		L		T	W		L		T
No. 2 Jacksonville State $	5	–	0	–	0	10	–	0	–	0
Tennessee–Martin	4	–	1	–	0	7	–	3	–	0
Troy State	3	–	2	–	0	6	–	4	–	1
Delta State	2	–	3	–	0	3	–	6	–	1
Florence State	1	–	4	–	0	5	–	5	–	0
Livingston	0	–	5	–	0	4	–	5	–	0
$ – Conference champion; Rankings from NAIA Division I poll

1970 Minnesota Intercollegiate Athletic Conference football standings
	Conf.					Overall
Team	W		L		T	W		L		T
Concordia–Moorhead $	6	–	1	–	0	7	–	2	–	1
No. 14 Gustavus Adolphus	5	–	2	–	0	8	–	2	–	0
Saint John's (MN)	5	–	2	–	0	6	–	3	–	0
Minnesota–Duluth	4	–	2	–	1	7	–	2	–	1
Hamline	3	–	4	–	0	6	–	4	–	0
Macalester	2	–	4	–	1	3	–	5	–	1
Augsburg	1	–	6	–	0	1	–	8	–	0
St. Thomas (MN)	1	–	6	–	0	1	–	9	–	0
$ – Conference champion; Rankings from NAIA Division I poll

1970 Northern Intercollegiate Conference football standings
	Conf.					Overall
Team	W		L		T	W		L		T
Michigan Tech +	5	–	1	–	0	8	–	1	–	0
Minnesota Morris +	5	–	1	–	0	7	–	2	–	0
St. Cloud State +	5	–	1	–	0	6	–	3	–	0
Moorhead State	3	–	3	–	0	4	–	4	–	1
Winona State	1	–	5	–	0	2	–	7	–	0
Bemidji State	1	–	5	–	0	1	–	8	–	0
Southwest State (MN)	1	–	5	–	0	1	–	8	–	0
+ – Conference co-champions

1970 Northwest Conference football standings
	Conf.					Overall
Team	W		L		T	W		L		T
No. 8 Linfield $	6	–	0	–	0	8	–	1	–	0
Pacific Lutheran	4	–	2	–	0	6	–	3	–	0
Lewis & Clark	4	–	2	–	0	5	–	4	–	0
Willamette	3	–	3	–	0	4	–	4	–	0
Whitman	3	–	3	–	0	4	–	5	–	0
College of Idaho	1	–	5	–	0	2	–	7	–	0
Pacific (OR)	0	–	6	–	0	0	–	8	–	0
$ – Conference champion; Rankings from NAIA Division I poll

1970 Oklahoma Collegiate Conference football standings
	Conf.					Overall
Team	W		L		T	W		L		T
No. 9 SW Oklahoma State $	7	–	0	–	1	8	–	1	–	1
No. 10 Northeastern State	6	–	1	–	1	8	–	1	–	1
No. 11 Central State (OK)	6	–	2	–	0	9	–	2	–	0
Cameron	6	–	2	–	0	8	–	2	–	1
East Central	4	–	4	–	0	6	–	4	–	0
NW Oklahoma State	2	–	5	–	1	4	–	5	–	1
Panhandle	2	–	6	–	0	4	–	7	–	0
Langston	1	–	7	–	0	1	–	10	–	0
SE Oklahoma State	0	–	7	–	1	0	–	9	–	1
$ – Conference champion; Rankings from NAIA Division I poll

1970 Rocky Mountain Athletic Conference football standings
	Conf.					Overall
Team	W		L		T	W		L		T
Mountain Division
Western New Mexico xy	5	–	1	–	0	5	–	4	–	0
Southern Utah x	5	–	1	–	0	6	–	3	–	0
Adams State	4	–	2	–	0	4	–	3	–	2
Westminster (UT)	3	–	3	–	0	4	–	6	–	0
Western State (CO)	2	–	4	–	0	2	–	7	–	0
Fort Lewis	1	–	5	–	0	1	–	8	–	0
Colorado Mines	1	–	5	–	0	1	–	9	–	0
Plains Division
No. 20 Pittsburg State xy$	4	–	1	–	0	9	–	2	–	0
Northern Colorado x	4	–	1	–	0	7	–	2	–	0
Nebraska–Omaha	4	–	2	–	0	4	–	5	–	1
Fort Hays State	2	–	3	–	0	5	–	5	–	0
Southern Colorado	1	–	4	–	0	5	–	5	–	0
Emporia State	1	–	4	–	0	1	–	8	–	0
Washburn *	0	–	0	–	0	5	–	3	–	2
Championship: Pittsburg State 52, Western New Mexico 6
$ – Conference champion; x – Division champion/co-champions; y – Championship game participant; * – Washburn was ineligible for conference title; Rankings from NAIA Division I poll

1970 South Dakota Intercollegiate Conference football standings
	Conf.					Overall
Team	W		L		T	W		L		T
Black Hills State +	5	–	1	–	0	8	–	2	–	0
Northern State +	5	–	1	–	0	6	–	4	–	0
South Dakota Tech +	5	–	1	–	0	5	–	4	–	0
Dakota State	3	–	3	–	0	5	–	4	–	0
Dakota Wesleyan	2	–	4	–	0	3	–	6	–	0
Huron	1	–	5	–	0	3	–	6	–	0
Southern State (SD)	0	–	6	–	0	0	–	9	–	0
$ – Conference champion

1970 Southwestern Athletic Conference football standings
	Conf.					Overall
Team	W		L		T	W		L		T
No. 7/9 Alcorn A&M $	6	–	0	–	0	8	–	1	–	0
No. 13/16 Grambling	5	–	1	–	0	9	–	2	–	0
Texas Southern	4	–	2	–	0	6	–	3	–	0
Southern	2	–	3	–	1	5	–	5	–	1
Prairie View A&M	2	–	3	–	1	4	–	5	–	1
Jackson State	1	–	5	–	0	4	–	7	–	0
Mississippi Valley State	0	–	6	–	0	1	–	8	–	0
$ – Conference champion; Rankings from NAIA Division I poll and AP small college poll

1970 West Virginia Intercollegiate Athletic Conference football standings
	Conf.					Overall
Team	W		L		T	W		L		T
No. 6 West Liberty State $	7	–	0	–	1	8	–	1	–	1
No. 12 Bluefield State	5	–	1	–	0	7	–	1	–	0
Salem	5	–	3	–	1	5	–	3	–	1
West Virginia State	4	–	3	–	0	4	–	5	–	0
Shepherd	2	–	2	–	0	5	–	5	–	0
Glenville State	4	–	4	–	0	4	–	5	–	0
Concord	3	–	4	–	0	3	–	6	–	0
Fairmont State	2	–	4	–	0	4	–	6	–	0
West Virginia Wesleyan	0	–	5	–	1	0	–	7	–	1
West Virginia Tech	0	–	6	–	1	1	–	7	–	1
$ – Conference champion; Conference standings based on power ratings; Rankings from NAIA Division I poll

1970 Wisconsin State University Conference football standings
	Conf.					Overall
Team	W		L		T	W		L		T
No. 3 Platteville State $^	8	–	0	–	0	10	–	1	–	0
Eau Claire State	5	–	3	–	0	6	–	4	–	0
Whitewater State	5	–	3	–	0	6	–	4	–	0
Oshkosh State	5	–	3	–	0	5	–	5	–	0
Superior State	5	–	3	–	0	5	–	5	–	0
La Crosse State	4	–	3	–	1	5	–	4	–	1
Stout State	2	–	6	–	0	3	–	7	–	0
Stevens Point State	1	–	6	–	1	1	–	8	–	1
River Falls State	0	–	8	–	0	1	–	8	–	0
$ – Conference champion; ^ – NAIA Division I playoff participant; Rankings from NAIA Division I poll

1970 NAIA Division I independents football records
	Conf.			Overall
Team	W	L	T	W		L		T
No. 4/6 Wofford ^		–		11	–	1	–	0
No. 18/NR Hillsdale		–		9	–	2	–	0
No. 5/NR New Mexico Highlands ^		–		9	–	2	–	0
No. 19/19 Eastern Michigan		–		7	–	2	–	1
La Verne		–		5	–	4	–	0
Appalachian State		–		6	–	5	–	0
Carson–Newman		–		4	–	6	–	0
Kentucky State		–		3	–	6	–	0
Eastern New Mexico		–		2	–	8	–	0
$ – Conference champion; ^ – NAIA Division I playoff participant; Rankings from NAIA Division I poll and AP small college poll

== Postseason ==
Semifinals; November 28, 1970
Platteville State	0
Texas A&I*	16
New Mexico Highlands	23
Wofford*	28

1970 Champion Bowl; December 12, 1970; Greenville, SC
Texas A&I	48
Wofford	*7

== See also ==
- 1970 NAIA Division II football season
- 1970 NCAA University Division football season
- 1970 NCAA College Division football season
