= 1970 Milwaukee Panthers football team =

American college football season

1970 Milwaukee Panthers football
- Conference: Independent
- Record: 1–9
- Head coach: Jerry Golembiewski (1st season)
- Home stadium: Milwaukee County Stadium; Marquette Stadium

1970 NCAA College Division independents football records
	Conf.			Overall
Team	W	L	T	W		L		T
No. 4 Tampa		–		10	–	1	–	0
No. 5 Tennessee State		–		10	–	0	–	0
No. 11 Delaware		–		9	–	2	–	0
Hawaii		–		9	–	2	–	0
Northern Michigan		–		8	–	2	–	0
No. 19 Eastern Michigan		–		7	–	2	–	1
Mankato State		–		7	–	2	–	1
Akron		–		7	–	3	–	0
Central Michigan		–		7	–	3	–	0
Temple		–		7	–	3	–	0
Drake		–		7	–	4	–	0
Wayne State (MI)		–		6	–	2	–	0
Arkansas AM&N		–		6	–	3	–	0
Southern Illinois		–		6	–	3	–	0
St. Norbert		–		6	–	3	–	0
Nevada		–		6	–	3	–	1
Portland State		–		6	–	4	–	0
UNLV		–		6	–	4	–	0
Boston University		–		5	–	4	–	0
Cortland		–		5	–	4	–	0
Indiana (PA)		–		5	–	4	–	0
Santa Clara		–		5	–	4	–	1
Lafayette		–		6	–	5	–	0
Colorado College		–		4	–	4	–	0
Drexel		–		4	–	4	–	0
Hofstra		–		5	–	5	–	0
Indiana State		–		5	–	5	–	0
Samford		–		5	–	5	–	0
Wabash		–		3	–	3	–	2
Saint Mary's		–		3	–	4	–	0
Ashland		–		4	–	6	–	0
Bucknell		–		4	–	6	–	0
Lehigh		–		4	–	6	–	0
Rose Poly		–		3	–	5	–	1
Illinois College		–		3	–	5	–	0
Northeastern		–		3	–	5	–	0
Indiana Central		–		3	–	6	–	0
Lake Forest		–		3	–	6	–	0
Kentucky State		–		3	–	6	–	0
Chicago		–		2	–	5	–	0
Chattanooga		–		3	–	8	–	0
Parsons		–		2	–	7	–	0
Eastern Illinois		–		2	–	8	–	0
Milwaukee		–		1	–	9	–	0
Rankings from AP small college poll

The 1970 Milwaukee Panthers football team represented the University of Wisconsin–Milwaukee as an independent during the 1970 NCAA College Division football season. Led by Jerry Golembiewski in his first season as head coach, Milwaukee compiled a record of 1–9. The Panthers offense scored 130 points while the defense allowed 252 points.

== Schedule ==
Date	Opponent	Site	Result	Attendance	Source
September 19	at Eastern Illinois	O'Brien Stadium; Charleston, IL	L 14–19	7,500	
September 26	Central Michigan	Milwaukee County Stadium; Milwaukee, WI	L 0–27	1,929	
October 3	Western Illinois	Marquette Stadium; Milwaukee, WI	L 7–38	2,000	
October 10	at Ferris State	Top Taggart Field; Big Rapids, MI	L 0–3	4,500	
October 17	Chicago Circle	Milwaukee County Stadium; Milwaukee, WI	W 51–6	1,289	
October 24	at Eastern Michigan	Rynearson Stadium; Ypsilanti, MI	L 0–35	3,500	
October 31	St. Norbert	Milwaukee County Stadium; Milwaukee, WI	L 21–28	1,274	
November 7	at Bradley	Peoria Stadium; Peoria, IL	L 20–34	3,500	
November 14	at Lakeland	Muskie Field; Herman, WI	L 3–10	500	
November 21	Illinois State	Engelmann Field; Milwaukee, WI	L 14–52	250	
