= 1970 college football season =

1970 college football season may refer to:

- 1970 NCAA University Division football season
- 1970 NCAA College Division football season
- 1970 NAIA Division I football season
- 1970 NAIA Division II football season
