= 1970 North Carolina A&T Aggies football team =

American college football season

1970 North Carolina A&T Aggies football
- Conference: Central Intercollegiate Athletic Association
- Record: 4–6 (0–3 CIAA)
- Head coach: Hornsby Howell (3rd season)
- Home stadium: World War Memorial Stadium

1970 Central Intercollegiate Athletic Association football standings
	Conf.					Overall
Team	W		L		T	W		L		T
Northern Division
Morgan State x	5	–	0	–	0	8	–	2	–	0
No. 16 Virginia State y$	5	–	1	–	0	8	–	2	–	0
Delaware State	4	–	1	–	0	6	–	2	–	0
Howard	3	–	2	–	0	7	–	2	–	0
Saint Paul's (VA)	1	–	1	–	0	3	–	5	–	0
Norfolk State	2	–	3	–	0	3	–	6	–	0
Virginia Union	1	–	4	–	0	3	–	6	–	0
Maryland Eastern Shore	1	–	5	–	0	1	–	8	–	0
Hampton	0	–	5	–	0	0	–	9	–	0
Southern Division
No. 17 Johnson C. Smith xy	6	–	0	–	0	8	–	2	–	0
Elizabeth City State	4	–	1	–	0	6	–	3	–	0
North Carolina Central	3	–	1	–	0	5	–	4	–	0
Shaw	3	–	2	–	1	3	–	5	–	1
Fayetteville State	1	–	3	–	1	3	–	5	–	1
Livingstone	1	–	4	–	0	2	–	7	–	0
Winston-Salem State	1	–	5	–	0	3	–	5	–	0
North Carolina A&T	0	–	3	–	0	4	–	6	–	0
Championship: Virginia State 32, Johnson C. Smith 14
$ – Conference champion; x – Division champion/co-champions; y – Championship game participant; Rankings from NAIA Division I poll

The 1970 North Carolina A&T Aggies football team represented North Carolina A&T State University as a member of the Central Intercollegiate Athletic Association (CIAA) during the 1970 NCAA College Division football season. Led by third-year head coach Hornsby Howell, the Aggies compiled an overall record of 4–6, with a mark of 0–3 in conference play, and finished eighth in the Southern Division of the CIAA.

== Schedule ==
Date	Opponent	Site	Result	Attendance	Source
September 11	vs. Southern*	Yankee Stadium; Bronx, NY (Football Coaches Foundation Classic)	L 6–21	25,000–29,125	
September 19	vs. South Carolina State*	Groves Stadium; Winston-Salem, NC (rivalry)	W 24–23	12,000	
September 26	at Florida A&M*	Bragg Memorial Stadium; Tallahassee, FL	L 0–33	10,891	
October 3	at Johnson C. Smith	American Legion Memorial Stadium; Charlotte, NC	L 20–24		
October 10	Norfolk State*	World War Memorial Stadium; Greensboro, NC	W 21–18		
October 17	at Maryland Eastern Shore*	Princess Anne, MD	W 23–6		
October 31	Morgan State*	World War Memorial Stadium; Greensboro, NC	L 9–15		
November 7	at Elizabeth City State	Viking Stadium; Elizabeth City, NC	L 6–19		
November 14	Virginia State*	World War Memorial Stadium; Greensboro, NC	W 14–6		
November 21	at North Carolina Central	Durham County Memorial Stadium; Durham, NC (rivalry)	L 7–13		
*Non-conference game; Source:
