= Pete Griffin (American football) =

American high schoo, college sports coach (1923–1999)

Biographical details
- Born: May 29, 1916; Columbus, Ohio, U.S.
- Died: May 15, 1998 (aged 81); Tallahassee, Florida, U.S.

Playing career

Football
- 1937–1939: Florida A&M
- Position: Center

Coaching career (HC unless noted)

Football
- 1944–1969: Florida A&M (assistant)
- 1970: Florida A&M
- 1972–1973: Florida A&M (assistant)

Track and field
- 1950s–1960s: Florida A&M

Head coaching record
- Overall: 5–5 (football)
- Bowls: 0–1

Accomplishments and honors

Championships
- Football>br>1 SIAC Division I (1970)

Robert "Pete" 'Griffin (May 29, 1916 – August 8, 1998) was an American college football coach. He served as the head football coach at Florida A&M University (FAMU) for their 1970 season after serving the previous 25 as a defensive assistant coach. He also served as head coach of the track and field team of the Rattlers in the 1950s and 1960s.

== Biography ==
A native of Columbus, Ohio, Griffin played the center position for the Rattlers from 1937 to 1939. He returned to Florida A&M in 1944, and remained on staff as a defensive assistant coach through their 1969 season. Griffin was promoted to head coach in January 1970 after the retirement of long-time head coach Jake Gaither. Griffin resigned as head coach in February 1971 after a single season where he led the Rattlers to a 5–5 record. He subsequently returned to Florida A&M to serve as a defenseive assistant coach under Jim Williams for their 1972 and 1973 seasons.

Griffin also served as head coach of the track and field squad at Florida A&M and led the Rattlers to seven consecutive Southern Intercollegiate Athletic Conference championships from 1955 to 1962. His most celebrated track athlete was Bob Hayes who set a world record for the 100-yard dash with a time of 9.1 seconds in 1963 and won a pair of gold medals at the 1964 Summer Olympics.

Griffin retired from Florida A&M in 1976 and remained in Tallahassee until his passing on August 8, 1998.

== Head coaching record ==
=== Football ===
Year	Team	Overall	Conference	Standing	Bowl/playoffs
Florida A&M Rattlers (Southern Intercollegiate Athletic Conference) (1970)
1970	Florida A&M	5–5	4–1	T–1st (Division I)	L Orange Blossom Classic
Florida A&M:		5–5	4–1		
Total:		5–5			
National championship Conference title Conference division title or championship game berth
