= Ulysses S. McPherson =

American football coach and athletics administrator

Biographical details
- Born: September 16, 1926; Louisville, Kentucky, U.S.

Playing career

Football
- 1946–1947: Tennessee A&I
- 1951–1952: Fort Knox
- Position: Center

Coaching career (HC unless noted)

Football
- 1948–1950: Morristown
- 1953: Morristown
- 1954–1957: Mississippi Vocational
- 1958–1959: Druid HS (AL)
- 1960–1961: Arkansas AM&N (assistant)
- 1969–1970: Jackson State
- 1971: Alabama State (assistant)

Wrestling
- c. 1978: Maryland Eastern Shore

Administrative career (AD unless noted)
- 1953–1954: Morristown
- 1954–1958: Mississippi Vocational
- 1958–1960: Druid HS (AL)
- 1972–1974: Alabama State
- c. 1978: Maryland Eastern Shore (assistant AD)

Head coaching record
- Overall: 14–5 (high school football)

Accomplishments and honors

Championships
- Football; 1 EIAC (1953); 3 SCAC (1955–1957)

Ulysses Simpson McPherson Jr. (born September 16, 1926), nicknamed "Jodie", "Killer", and "Mac", was an American football coach and athletics administrator. He served as head football coach at Morristown College in Morristown, Tennessee, from 1948 to 1950 and again in 1953, Mississippi Vocational College—now known as Mississippi Valley State University—in Itta Bena, Mississippi, from 1954 to 1957, and Jackson State University in Jackson, Mississippi, from 1969 to 1970.

== Biography ==
A native of Louisville, Kentucky, McPherson graduated from Central Colored High School in 1944. He earned an undergraduate degree from Tennessee Agricultural & Industrial State College—now known as Tennessee State University–in Nashville, Tennessee, where he played college football as a center, and earned all-Midwest Athletic Association honors in 1946 and 1947. He later earned a Master of Physical Education degree from Indiana University.

His tenure at Morristown was interrupted by army service, during which time he was stationed at Fort Knox and played for the Fort Knox Tankers football team in 1951 and 1952. McPherson was appointed athletic director, head football coach, and head of the department of health, physical education and recreation at Mississippi Vocational in 1954.

After leaving Mississippi Vocational in 1958, McPherson was athletic director and coach at Druid High School in Tuscaloosa, Alabama and then an assistant in the physical education department at Arkansas Agricultural, Mechanical and Normal College—now known as University of Arkansas at Pine Bluff. He was removed from the coaching staff following the departure of head coach Charles Spearman in 1962, but remained with the school as a fulltime instructor. In 1963, he was promoted to assistant to the director of health and physical education.

In 1969, McPherson succeeded Rod Paige as head football coach at Jackson State. He was fired after the 1970 season due to "coaching staff problems". His record over two seasons was 6–13.

McPherson was hired in 1971 as an assistant football coach at Alabama State University in Montgomery, Alabama. He was appointed the acting athletic director at Alabama State in February 1972. He held this position until 1974, but remained with the school as a recreation specialist. He resigned from Alabama State in 1975.

McPherson was later assistant athletic director and wrestling coach at the University of Maryland Eastern Shore, and oversaw the Summer Youth Sports Program in Princess Anne, Maryland.

In 1992, McPherson was an inaugural inductee into the SWAC Hall of Fame.

== Head coaching record ==
=== College football ===
Year	Team	Overall	Conference	Standing	Bowl/playoffs
Morristown Red Knights (Eastern Intercollegiate Athletic Conference) (1948–1950)
1948	Morristown	3–4	2–2	4th	
1949	Morristown	8–2–1	4–1	2nd	
1950	Morristown	5–1–1	3–0	1st (Note: Morristown finished first in the Eastern Intercollegiate Athletic Conference (EIAC) standings, but did not play enough conference games to be eligible for the championship, so second-place Norfolk State was awarded the conference title.)	
Morristown Red Knights (Eastern Intercollegiate Athletic Conference) (1953)
1953	Morristown		3–0–1	T–1st	
Morristown:			12–3–1		
Mississippi Vocational Delta Devils (South Central Athletic Conference) (1954–1957)
1954	Mississippi Vocational	6–3			
1955	Mississippi Vocational	7–2		1st	
1956	Mississippi Vocational	8–1–1			
1957	Mississippi Vocational	5–3–1		T–1st	
Mississippi Vocational:		26–8–2			
Jackson State Tigers (Southwestern Athletic Conference) (1969–1970)
1969	Jackson State	2–6	1–6	T–7th	
1970	Jackson State	4–7	1–5	6th	
Jackson State:		6–13	2–11		
Total:		49–28–4			
National championship Conference title Conference division title or championship game berth
