= 1970 McNeese State Cowboys football team =

American college football season

1970 McNeese State Cowboys football
- Conference: Gulf States Conference
- Record: 5–6 (2–3 GSC)
- Head coach: Jack Doland (1st season)
- Home stadium: Cowboy Stadium

1970 Gulf States Conference football standings
	Conf.					Overall
Team	W		L		T	W		L		T
Southwestern Louisiana $	5	–	0	–	0	9	–	2	–	0
Northwestern State	3	–	2	–	0	7	–	3	–	0
Northeast Louisiana	3	–	2	–	0	5	–	4	–	0
McNeese State	2	–	3	–	0	5	–	6	–	0
Southeastern Louisiana	2	–	3	–	0	4	–	6	–	0
Louisiana Tech	0	–	5	–	0	2	–	8	–	0
$ – Conference champion

The 1970 McNeese State Cowboys football team was an American football team that represented McNeese State University as a member of the Gulf States Conference (GSC) during the 1970 NCAA College Division football season. In their first year under head coach Jack Doland, the team compiled an overall record of 5–6 with a mark of 2–3 in conference play, and finished tied for fourth in the GSC.

== Schedule ==
Date	Opponent	Site	Result	Attendance	Source
September 12	at East Texas State*	Memorial Stadium; Commerce, TX	L 26–57	6,500	
September 19	Sam Houston State*	Cowboy Stadium; Lake Charles, LA	L 19–24	11,500	
September 26	Tennessee–Martin*	Cowboy Stadium; Lake Charles, LA	L 7–10	10,000	
October 3	at Louisiana Tech	Louisiana Tech Stadium; Ruston, LA	W 16–14	10,000	
October 11	at Lamar Tech*	Cardinal Stadium; Beaumont, TX (rivalry)	W 17–12	15,156	
October 17	Northeast Louisiana	Cowboy Stadium; Lake Charles, LA	W 17–13	12,800	
October 24	at Pensacola NAS*	Kane Field; Penscaola, FL	W 28–7	3,000	
October 31	at Troy State*	Veterans Memorial Stadium; Troy, AL	W 38–7	10,000	
November 7	Northwestern State	Cowboy Stadium; Lake Charles, LA (rivalry)	L 7–15	12,300	
November 14	at Southeastern Louisiana	Strawberry Stadium; Hammond, LA	L 7–15	5,500	
November 21	No. 12 Southwestern Louisiana	Cowboy Stadium; Lake Charles, LA (rivalry)	L 7–13	14,000	
*Non-conference game; Rankings from AP Poll released prior to the game
