= Tom Porter (coach) =

American football and ice hockey coach (1929–2013)

Biographical details
- Born: April 21, 1929; Stillwater, Minnesota, U.S.
- Died: January 24, 2013 (aged 83); Northfield, Minnesota, U.S.
- Education: St. Olaf

Playing career

Football
- c. 1950: St. Olaf

Ice hockey
- c. 1950: St. Olaf

Coaching career (HC unless noted)

Football
- 1954–1955: Neenah HS (WI) (assistant)
- 1956–1957: Neenah HS (WI)
- 1958–1967: St. Olaf
- 1969–1990: St. Olaf

Ice hockey
- 1970–1977: St. Olaf

Head coaching record
- Overall: 171–119–10 (football); 24–110 (ice hockey)
- Tournaments: Football; 0–1 (NCAA D-III playoffs)

Accomplishments and honors

Championships
- Football; 6 MWC (1960–1961, 1966, 1969–1971); 2 MIAC (1978–1979)

Awards
- Football; MIAC Coach of the Year (1978)

Thomas Gene Porter (April 21, 1929 – January 24, 2013) was an American football and ice hockey coach. He served two stints as the head football coach at St. Olaf College in Northfield, Minnesota from 1958 to 1967 and 1969 to 1990, compiling a record of 171–119–10. Porter was also the head ice hockey coach at St. Olaf from 1970 to 1977, tallying a mark of 24–110.

A native of Stillwater, Minnesota, Porter attended high school in Bayport, Minnesota. He played football and ice hockey at St. Olaf before graduating in 1951. Porter began his coaching career in 1954 as an assistant football coach at Neenah High School in Neenah, Wisconsin under head coach Jerry Thompson. He succeeded Thompson has head coach 1956 when Thompson left to become head football coach at Ripon College. Porter also coached track and freshman basketball at Neenah.

== Head coaching record ==
=== Football ===
Year	Team	Overall	Conference	Standing	Bowl/playoffs
St. Olaf Oles (Midwest Conference) (1958–1967)
1958	St. Olaf	4–4	4–4	4th	
1959	St. Olaf	6–2	6–2	3rd	
1960	St. Olaf	6–2	6–2	1st	
1961	St. Olaf	6–2	6–2	T–1st	
1962	St. Olaf	5–2–1	5–2–1	T–3rd	
1963	St. Olaf	4–4	4–4	T–5th	
1964	St. Olaf	4–4	4–4	6th	
1965	St. Olaf	5–3	5–3	T–3rd	
1966	St. Olaf	7–1	7–1	T–1st	
1967	St. Olaf	6–2	6–2	2nd	
St. Olaf Oles (Midwest Conference) (1969–1973)
1969	St. Olaf	8–1	8–1	1st	
1970	St. Olaf	9–0	8–0	1st	
1971	St. Olaf	8–1	7–1	T–1st	
1972	St. Olaf	6–3	5–3	T–3rd	
1973	St. Olaf	5–4	5–3	5th	
St. Olaf Oles (Minnesota Intercollegiate Athletic Conference) (1974–1990)
1974	St. Olaf	3–6	1–6	T–8th	
1975	St. Olaf	5–3–1	3–3–1	5th	
1976	St. Olaf	7–3	5–2	T–2nd	
1977	St. Olaf	5–4–1	2–4–1	6th	
1978	St. Olaf	9–2	7–1	T–1st	L NCAA Division III Quarterfinal
1979	St. Olaf	7–3	6–2	T–1st	
1980	St. Olaf	6–4	4–4	T–5th	
1981	St. Olaf	4–7	2–6	T–6th	
1982	St. Olaf	2–8	1–7	T–8th	
1983	St. Olaf	3–7	3–6	T–7th	
1984	St. Olaf	5–3–2	4–3–2	5th	
1985	St. Olaf	4–6	4–5	T–5th	
1986	St. Olaf	5–5	4–5	T–6th	
1987	St. Olaf	3–7	3–6	T–7th	
1988	St. Olaf	4–6	3–6	T–6th	
1989	St. Olaf	6–4	5–4	T–4th	
1990	St. Olaf	4–6	3–6	8th	
St. Olaf:		171–119–10	146–110–5		
Total:		171–119–10			
National championship Conference title Conference division title or championship game berth
