= 1970 Northeast Louisiana Indians football team =

American college football season

1970 Northeast Louisiana Indians football
- Conference: Gulf States Conference
- Record: 5–4 (3–2 GSC)
- Head coach: Dixie B. White (7th season)
- Home stadium: Brown Stadium

1970 Gulf States Conference football standings
	Conf.					Overall
Team	W		L		T	W		L		T
Southwestern Louisiana $	5	–	0	–	0	9	–	2	–	0
Northwestern State	3	–	2	–	0	7	–	3	–	0
Northeast Louisiana	3	–	2	–	0	5	–	4	–	0
McNeese State	2	–	3	–	0	5	–	6	–	0
Southeastern Louisiana	2	–	3	–	0	4	–	6	–	0
Louisiana Tech	0	–	5	–	0	2	–	8	–	0
$ – Conference champion

The 1970 Northeast Louisiana Indians football team was an American football team that represented Northeast Louisiana University (now known as the University of Louisiana at Monroe) in the Gulf States Conference during the 1970 NCAA College Division football season. In their seventh year under head coach Dixie B. White, the team compiled a 5–4 record. The Indians offense scored 151 points while the defense allowed 146 points.

Running back Joe Profit received first-team honors on the 1970 Little All-America college football team.

== Schedule ==
Date	Opponent	Site	Result	Attendance	Source
September 19	at Pensacola NAS*	Pensacola, FL	W 28–14	4,000	
October 3	Northwestern State	Brown Stadium; Monroe, LA (rivalry)	W 21–17	8,100	
October 10	Quantico Marines*	Brown Stadium; Monroe, LA	L 20–21	6,800	
October 17	at McNeese State	Cowboy Stadium; Lake Charles, LA	L 13–17	12,800	
October 24	at Southeastern Louisiana	Strawberry Stadium; Hammond, LA	W 20–17	7,300	
October 31	No. 9 Southwestern Louisiana	Brown Stadium; Monroe, LA (Battle on the Bayou)	L 7–9	8,200	
November 7	at Eastern Michigan*	Rynearson Stadium; Ypsilanti, MI	L 0–20	6,800	
November 14	Troy State*	Brown Stadium; Monroe, LA	W 14–10	3,000	
November 21	Louisiana Tech	Brown Stadium; Monroe, LA (rivalry)	W 28–21	8,400	
*Non-conference game; Rankings from AP Poll released prior to the game
