= Dave Maurer (American football) =

American football player, coach, and administrator (1932–2011)

Biographical details
- Born: March 18, 1932; Duquesne, Pennsylvania, U.S.
- Died: July 30, 2011 (aged 79); Springfield, Ohio, U.S.

Playing career
- 1950s: Denison
- Position: Quarterback

Coaching career (HC unless noted)
- 1955–1968: Wittenberg (assistant)
- 1969–1983: Wittenberg

Head coaching record
- Overall: 129–23–3
- Bowls: 1–0
- Tournaments: 9–2 (NCAA D-III playoffs)

Accomplishments and honors

Championships
- 2 NCAA Division III (1973, 1975); 8 OAC (1969–1970, 1973–1974, 1976, 1978–1979, 1981)

Awards
- 2× AFCA College Division COY (1973, 1975); 5× OAC Coach of the Year (1969, 1973, 1976, 1978–1979)
- College Football Hall of Fame; Inducted in 1991 (profile)

Dave Maurer (March 18, 1932 – July 30, 2011) was an American college football coach and athletics administrator. He served as the head football coach at Wittenberg University from 1969 to 1983, compiling a record of 129–23–3. His teams won the NCAA Division III Football Championship in 1973 and 1975, and were runners-up in 1978 and 1979. Maurer was inducted into the College Football Hall of Fame in 1991 as a coach. He died on July 30, 2011, at the Eaglewood Care Center in Springfield, Ohio.

== Head coaching record ==
| Year | Team | Overall | Conference | Standing | Bowl/playoffs |
|---|---|---|---|---|---|
Wittenberg Tigers (Ohio Athletic Conference) (1969–1983)
| 1969 | Wittenberg | 10–0 | 4–0 | 1st | W Amos Alonzo Stagg |
| 1970 | Wittenberg | 9–0 | 5–0 | T–1st | |
| 1971 | Wittenberg | 5–4 | 2–2 | T–7th | |
| 1972 | Wittenberg | 5–4 | 3–2 | T–2nd (Red) | |
| 1973 | Wittenberg | 12–0 | 5–0 | 1st (Red) | W NCAA Division III Championship |
| 1974 | Wittenberg | 7–1–2 | 3–0–1 | 1st (Blue) | |
| 1975 | Wittenberg | 12–1 | 4–0 | 1st (Blue) | W NCAA Division III Championship |
| 1976 | Wittenberg | 8–2 | 5–0 | 1st (Red) | |
| 1977 | Wittenberg | 9–1 | 5–0 | 1st (Red) | |
| 1978 | Wittenberg | 10–1–1 | 5–0 | 1st (Blue) | L NCAA Division III Championship |
| 1979 | Wittenberg | 11–1 | 5–0 | 1st (Blue) | L NCAA Division III Championship |
| 1980 | Wittenberg | 8–2 | 6–0 | 1st (Blue) | |
| 1981 | Wittenberg | 8–2 | 6–0 | 1st (Blue) | |
| 1982 | Wittenberg | 7–2 | 4–1 | 2nd (Blue) | |
| 1983 | Wittenberg | 8–2 | 5–0 | 1st (Red) | |
| Wittenberg: | | 129–23–3 | 67–5–1 | | |
| Total: | | 129–23–3 | | | |
National championship Conference title Conference division title or championship game berth
