= 1970 Florida A&M Rattlers football team =

American college football season

1970 Florida A&M Rattlers football

SIAC Division I co-champion

Orange Blossom Classic, L 7–21 vs. Jacksonville State
- Conference: Southern Intercollegiate Athletic Conference
- Division I
- Record: 5–5 (4–1 SIAC)
- Head coach: Pete Griffin (1st season)
- Home stadium: Bragg Memorial Stadium

1970 Southern Intercollegiate Athletic Conference football standings
	Conf.					Overall
Team	W		L		T	W		L		T
Division I
No. 4 Tuskegee x	4	–	1	–	0	9	–	1	–	0
Florida A&M x	4	–	1	–	0	5	–	5	–	0
Alabama State	3	–	2	–	0	6	–	4	–	0
Morris Brown	3	–	2	–	0	4	–	5	–	0
Alabama A&M	2	–	3	–	0	4	–	5	–	0
Albany State	2	–	3	–	0	4	–	6	–	0
Bethune–Cookman	1	–	4	–	0	5	–	4	–	0
South Carolina State	1	–	4	–	0	3	–	6	–	0
Division II
Fort Valley State x	4	–	1	–	0	7	–	2	–	0
Fisk x	4	–	1	–	0	5	–	2	–	0
Savannah State	3	–	2	–	0	3	–	5	–	0
Lane	3	–	2	–	0	3	–	7	–	0
Morehouse	1	–	4	–	0	3	–	6	–	0
Clark (GA)	1	–	4	–	0	2	–	6	–	0
Knoxville	1	–	4	–	0	1	–	6	–	0
x – Division champion/co-champions; Rankings from NAIA Division II poll

The 1970 Florida A&M Rattlers football team represented Florida A&M University as a member of Division I of the Southern Intercollegiate Athletic Conference (SIAC) during the 1970 NCAA College Division football season. Led by first-year head coach Pete Griffin, the Rattlers finished the season overall record of 5–5 and a mark of 4–1 in conference play.

== Schedule ==
Date	Opponent	Site	Result	Attendance	Source
September 26	North Carolina A&T*	Bragg Memorial Stadium; Tallahassee, FL	W 33–0	10,891	
October 3	at South Carolina State	State College Stadium; Orangeburg, SC	W 28–10		
October 10	Alabama A&M	Bragg Memorial Stadium; Tallahassee, FL	W 34–16	10,000	
October 17	at Morris Brown	Herndon Stadium; Atlanta, GA	L 22–28	13,000	
October 24	No. 5 Tennessee State*	Bragg Memorial Stadium; Tallahassee, FL	L 10–21	13,500–14,000	
October 31	Tuskegee^{†}	Bragg Memorial Stadium; Tallahassee, FL	W 7–0	16,831	
November 14	vs. Southern*	Tulane Stadium; New Orleans, LA (Urban League of GNO Classic)	L 19–40	31,950	
November 21	at Bethune–Cookman	Memorial Stadium; Daytona Beach, FL (Florida Classic)	W 20–9	8,600	
November 28	at No. 5 Tampa*	Tampa Stadium; Tampa, FL	L 7–49	45,253	
December 12	vs. No. 8 Jacksonville State*	Miami Orange Bowl; Miami, FL (Orange Blossom Classic)	L 7–21	31,184	
*Non-conference game; ^{†}Homecoming; Rankings from AP Poll released prior to the game; Source:

== Roster ==
1970 Florida A&M Rattlers football team roster
Players
Coaches
Offense

Pos.	#	Name	Class
QB	10	Steve Scruggs	Jr
RB	20	Glen Edwards	Sr
OT	79	Charlie Goodrum	Jr
WR	87	Alfred Sykes	Sr

Defense

Pos.	#	Name	Class
DB	33	Leroy Green	Jr

Special teams

Pos.	#	Name	Class

Head coach

- Pete Griffin

Coordinators/assistant coaches

Legend

- (C) Team captain
- (S) Suspended
- (I) Ineligible
- Injured
- Redshirt
