= Hornsby Howell =

American football player and coach (1927–2017)

Biographical details
- Born: September 3, 1927
- Died: October 3, 2017 (aged 90); Raleigh, North Carolina, U.S.

Playing career

Football
- c. 1946: North Carolina A&T
- Position: Center

Coaching career (HC unless noted)

Football
- 1950–1952: Jordan Sellers HS (NC)
- 1961: Southern (assistant)
- 1964–1967: North Carolina A&T (assistant)
- 1968–1976: North Carolina A&T
- 1982: Georgia (scout team)

Basketball
- 1964–1968: North Carolina A&T (assistant)

Administrative career (AD unless noted)
- 1968–?: North Carolina A&T
- 1996–1998: Savannah State (interim AD)

Head coaching record
- Overall: 55–34–4 (college)

Accomplishments and honors

Championships
- 1 MEAC (1975)

Awards
- 2× MEAC Coach of the Year (1974–1975)

Hornsby Howell (September 3, 1927 – October 3, 2017) was an American football player and coach. He served as the head football coach at North Carolina A&T University from 1968 to 1976, compiling a record of 55–34–4.

In 1982, he was a scout team assistant coach at the University of Georgia, becoming the school's first African-American football coach.

== Head coaching record ==
=== College ===
Year	Team	Overall	Conference	Standing	Bowl/playoffs
North Carolina A&T Aggies (Central Intercollegiate Athletic Association) (1968–1970)
1968	North Carolina A&T	8–1	6–1	2nd	
1969	North Carolina A&T	6–2–1	5–1–1	4th	
1970	North Carolina A&T	4–6	0–3	8th (Southern)	
North Carolina A&T Aggies (Mid-Eastern Athletic Conference) (1971–1976)
1971	North Carolina A&T	6–4–1	3–2–1	T–3rd	
1972	North Carolina A&T	8–2	4–2	T–2nd	
1973	North Carolina A&T	4–6–1	1–4–1	6th	
1974	North Carolina A&T	5–6	2–4	5th	
1975	North Carolina A&T	8–3	5–1	T–1st	
1976	North Carolina A&T	6–4–1	3–2–1	T–3rd	
North Carolina A&T:		55–34–4	29–20–4		
Total:		55–34–4			
National championship Conference title Conference division title or championship game berth
