= 1970 New Hampshire Wildcats football team =

American college football season

1970 New Hampshire Wildcats football
- Conference: Yankee Conference
- Record: 5–3 (3–2 Yankee)
- Head coach: Jim Root (3rd season)
- Home stadium: Cowell Stadium

1970 Yankee Conference football standings
	Conf.					Overall
Team	W		L		T	W		L		T
Connecticut $	4	–	0	–	1	4	–	4	–	2
UMass	3	–	1	–	1	4	–	5	–	1
New Hampshire	3	–	2	–	0	5	–	3	–	0
Rhode Island	3	–	2	–	0	3	–	5	–	0
Maine	1	–	4	–	0	3	–	5	–	0
Vermont	0	–	5	–	0	0	–	9	–	0
$ – Conference champion

The 1970 New Hampshire Wildcats football team was an American football team that represented the University of New Hampshire as a member of the Yankee Conference during the 1970 NCAA College Division football season. In its third year under head coach Jim Root, the team compiled a 5–3 record (3–2 against conference opponents) and tied for third place in the Yankee Conference.

== Schedule ==
Date	Opponent	Site	Result	Attendance	Source
September 26	at No. 5 Delaware*	Delaware Stadium; Newark, DE	L 12–53	13,348–17,318	
October 3	Connecticut	Cowell Stadium; Durham, NH	L 14–27	9,872	
October 10	Maine	Cowell Stadium; Durham, NH (Battle for the Brice–Cowell Musket)	W 13–9	12,678	
October 17	at Vermont	Centennial Field; Burlington, VT	W 27–0	3,700	
October 24	at Northeastern*	Parsons Field; Brookline, MA	W 33–7	4,130	
October 31	Rhode Island	Cowell Stadium; Durham, NH	W 59–7	10,053	
November 7	Springfield*	Cowell Stadium; Durham, NH	W 40–21	12,236	
November 14	at UMass	Alumni Stadium; Hadley, MA (rivalry)	L 14–24	12,200	
*Non-conference game; Rankings from AP Poll released prior to the game
