= Alva Tabor =

American football player and coach (1925–2002)

Biographical details
- Born: October 16, 1925
- Died: August 2002 (aged 76); Fort Valley, Georgia, U.S.

Playing career
- c. 1945: Tuskegee
- 1947–1948: Nevada
- Position: Fullback

Coaching career (HC unless noted)
- 1952–1953: Texas Southern (backfield)
- 1954–1955: Wiley
- 1957–1959: Fort Valley State
- 1962–1966: Southern (assistant)
- 1967: New Orleans Saints (assistant)
- 1969–1971: Southern
- 1972–1979: Cleveland Browns (ST)
- 1980: Virginia State
- 1981: Toronto Argonauts (LB)

Head coaching record
- Overall: 39–40–4

Alva Tabor Jr. (October 16, 1925 – August 2002) was an American football player and coach. He served as the head football coach at Wiley College from 1954 to 1955, Fort Valley State University from 1957 to 1959, Southern University from 1969 to 1971, and Virginia State University in 1980, compiling a career college football head coaching record of 39–40–4. Tabor was an assistant at Southern from 1962 to 1966. In 1967, he became a scout and assistant coach for the New Orleans Saints of the National Football League (NFL). Tabor was hired in 1972 as an assistant coach in charge of special teams for the Cleveland Browns of the (NFL). He was the first African-American hired as a full-time coach for the team.

== Head coaching record ==
=== College ===
Year	Team	Overall	Conference	Standing	Bowl/playoffs
Wiley Wildcats (Southwestern Athletic Conference) (1954–1955)
1954	Wiley	5–5	2–4	5th	
1955	Wiley	3–7	2–5	T–5th	
Wiley:		8–12	4–9		
Fort Valley State Wildcats (Southern Intercollegiate Athletic Conference) (1957–1959)
1957	Fort Valley State	6–3	5–3	3rd	
1958	Fort Valley State	5–2–1	3–2–1	5th	
1959	Fort Valley State	5–3–1	1–3–1	T–13th	
Fort Valley State:		16–8–2	9–8–2		
Southern Jaguars (Southwestern Athletic Conference) (1969–1971)
1969	Southern	6–2–1	5–1–1	2nd	
1970	Southern	5–5–1	2–3–1	T–4th	
1971	Southern	3–7	1–5	T–6th	
Southern:		14–14–2	8–9–2		
Virginia State Trojans (Central Intercollegiate Athletic Association) (1980)
1980	Virginia State	1–8	1–5	10th	
Virginia State:		1–8	1–5		
Total:		39–40–4			
