= 1970 Maine Black Bears football team =

American college football season

1970 Maine Black Bears football
- Conference: Yankee Conference
- Record: 3–5 (1–4 Yankee)
- Head coach: Walter Abbott (4th season)
- Captains: Robert Hamilton; Henry James
- Home stadium: Alumni Field

1970 Yankee Conference football standings
	Conf.					Overall
Team	W		L		T	W		L		T
Connecticut $	4	–	0	–	1	4	–	4	–	2
UMass	3	–	1	–	1	4	–	5	–	1
New Hampshire	3	–	2	–	0	5	–	3	–	0
Rhode Island	3	–	2	–	0	3	–	5	–	0
Maine	1	–	4	–	0	3	–	5	–	0
Vermont	0	–	5	–	0	0	–	9	–	0
$ – Conference champion

The 1970 Maine Black Bears football team was an American football team that represented the University of Maine as a member of the Yankee Conference during the 1970 NCAA College Division football season. In its fourth season under head coach Walter Abbott, the team compiled a 3–5 record (1–4 against conference opponents) and finished fifth out of six teams in the Yankee Conference. Robert Hamilton and Henry James were the team captains.

== Schedule ==
Date	Opponent	Site	Result	Attendance	Source
September 19	at UMass	Alumni Stadium; Amherst, MA	L 0–28	12,000	
September 26	Hofstra*	Alumni Field; Orono, ME	L 20–48	7,307	
October 3	Rhode Island	Alumni Field; Orono, ME	L 6–23	7,315	
October 10	at New Hampshire	Cowell Stadium; Durham, NH	L 9–13	12,678	
October 17	at Connecticut	Memorial Stadium; Storrs, CT	L 13–45	12,478	
October 24	C.W. Post	Alumni Field; Orono, ME	W 42–8	7,611	
October 31	at Northeastern	Parsons Field; Brookline, MA	W 24–17	5,000–5,610	
November 7	Vermont	Alumni Field; Orono, ME	W 28–21	4,978–5,000	
*Non-conference game
