= 1970 Mississippi Valley State Delta Devils football team =

American college football season

1970 Mississippi Valley State Delta Devils football
- Conference: Southwestern Athletic Conference
- Record: 1–8 (0–6 SWAC)
- Head coach: Davis Weathersby (1st season)
- Home stadium: Magnolia Stadium

1970 Southwestern Athletic Conference football standings
	Conf.					Overall
Team	W		L		T	W		L		T
No. 7/9 Alcorn A&M $	6	–	0	–	0	8	–	1	–	0
No. 13/16 Grambling	5	–	1	–	0	9	–	2	–	0
Texas Southern	4	–	2	–	0	6	–	3	–	0
Southern	2	–	3	–	1	5	–	5	–	1
Prairie View A&M	2	–	3	–	1	4	–	5	–	1
Jackson State	1	–	5	–	0	4	–	7	–	0
Mississippi Valley State	0	–	6	–	0	1	–	8	–	0
$ – Conference champion; Rankings from NAIA Division I poll and AP small college poll

The 1970 Mississippi Valley State Delta Devils football team represented Mississippi Valley State College (now known as Mississippi Valley State University) as a member of the Southwestern Athletic Conference (SWAC) during the 1970 NCAA College Division football season. Led by first-year head coach Davis Weathersby, the Delta Devils compiled an overall record of 1–8, with a conference record of 0–6, and finished seventh in the SWAC.

== Schedule ==
Date	Opponent	Site	Result	Attendance	Source
September 19	at Arkansas AM&N*	Pine Bluff, AR	L 7–30		
October 3	Southern	Magnolia Stadium; Itta Bena, MS	L 0–20		
October 10	Miles*	Magnolia Stadium; Itta Bena, MS	W 37–12		
October 17	vs. Grambling	Tiger Stadium; Detroit, MI (Black Charities Football Classic)	L 17–41	26,673	
October 24	at Texas Southern	Jeppesen Stadium; Houston, TX	L 7–20		
October 31	at Prairie View A&M	Edward L. Blackshear Field; Prairie View, TX	L 17–38		
November 7	No. 13 Alcorn A&M	Magnolia Stadium; Itta Bena, MS	L 14–40		
November 14	at Bethune–Cookman*	Municipal Stadium; Daytona Beach, FL	L 7–20	6,500	
November 21	at Jackson State	Mississippi Veterans Memorial Stadium; Jackson, MS	L 18–20	6,000	
*Non-conference game; Rankings from AP Poll released prior to the game
