= 1970 Jackson State Tigers football team =

American college football season

1970 Jackson State Tigers football
- Conference: Southwestern Athletic Conference
- Record: 4–7 (1–5 SWAC)
- Head coach: Ulysses S. McPherson (2nd season)
- Home stadium: Alumni Field; Mississippi Veterans Memorial Stadium

1970 Southwestern Athletic Conference football standings
| | Conf. | | | | | Overall |
| Team | W | | L | | T | W | | L | | T |
|---|---|---|---|---|---|---|---|---|---|---|
| No. 7/9 Alcorn A&M $ | 6 | – | 0 | – | 0 | 8 | – | 1 | – | 0 |
| No. 13/16 Grambling | 5 | – | 1 | – | 0 | 9 | – | 2 | – | 0 |
| Texas Southern | 4 | – | 2 | – | 0 | 6 | – | 3 | – | 0 |
| Southern | 2 | – | 3 | – | 1 | 5 | – | 5 | – | 1 |
| Prairie View A&M | 2 | – | 3 | – | 1 | 4 | – | 5 | – | 1 |
| Jackson State | 1 | – | 5 | – | 0 | 4 | – | 7 | – | 0 |
| Mississippi Valley State | 0 | – | 6 | – | 0 | 1 | – | 8 | – | 0 |
$ – Conference champion; Rankings from NAIA Division I poll and AP small college poll

The 1970 Jackson State Tigers football team represented Jackson State College (now known as Jackson State University) as a member of the Southwestern Athletic Conference (SWAC) during the 1970 NCAA College Division football season. Led by second-year head coach Ulysses S. McPherson, the Tigers compiled an overall record of 4–7, with a conference record of 1–5, and finished sixth in the SWAC.

== Schedule ==
| Date | Opponent | Site | Result | Attendance | Source |
|---|---|---|---|---|---|
| September 12 | Lane* | Alumni Field; Jackson, MS | W 21–14 | | |
| September 19 | Prairie View A&M | Mississippi Veterans Memorial Stadium; Jackson, MS | L 7–14 | | |
| October 3 | vs. Kentucky State* | Glass Bowl; Toledo, OH | W 48–13 | 20,000 | |
| October 10 | at Bishop* | Dallas, TX | L 13–19 | | |
| October 17 | at Southern | University Stadium; Baton Rouge, LA (rivalry) | L 14–27 | 23,242 | |
| October 24 | vs. Grambling | Municipal Stadium; Cleveland, OH ('70 Classic) | L 7–27 | 24,000 | |
| October 31 | at Texas Lutheran* | Matador Stadium; Seguin, TX | W 40–34 | | |
| November 7 | Texas Southern^{†} | Mississippi Veterans Memorial Stadium; Jackson, MS | L 21–27 | 9,172 | |
| November 14 | vs. Morgan State* | RFK Stadium; Washington, DC | L 21–24 | 5,000 | |
| November 21 | Mississippi Valley State | Mississippi Veterans Memorial Stadium; Jackson, MS | W 20–18 | 6,000 | |
| November 26 | No. 9 Alcorn A&M | Mississippi Veterans Memorial Stadium; Jackson, MS (rivalry) | L 11–30 | | |
*Non-conference game; ^{†}Homecoming; Rankings from AP Poll released prior to the game
