= 1970 Louisiana Tech Bulldogs football team =

American college football season

1970 Louisiana Tech Bulldogs football
- Conference: Gulf States Conference
- Record: 2–8 (0–5 GSC)
- Head coach: Maxie Lambright (4th season)
- Captains: Ronnie Alexander; Mark Graham
- Home stadium: Louisiana Tech Stadium

1970 Gulf States Conference football standings
	Conf.					Overall
Team	W		L		T	W		L		T
Southwestern Louisiana $	5	–	0	–	0	9	–	2	–	0
Northwestern State	3	–	2	–	0	7	–	3	–	0
Northeast Louisiana	3	–	2	–	0	5	–	4	–	0
McNeese State	2	–	3	–	0	5	–	6	–	0
Southeastern Louisiana	2	–	3	–	0	4	–	6	–	0
Louisiana Tech	0	–	5	–	0	2	–	8	–	0
$ – Conference champion

The 1970 Louisiana Tech Bulldogs football team was an American football team that represented Louisiana Tech University as a member of the Gulf States Conference during the 1970 NCAA College Division football season. In their fourth year under head coach Maxie Lambright, the team compiled a 2–8 record.

== Schedule ==
Date	Opponent	Rank	Site	Result	Attendance	Source
September 19	Chattanooga*		Louisiana Tech Stadium; Ruston, LA	W 28–3	12,000	
September 26	at Lamar Tech*	No. 8	Cardinal Stadium; Beaumont, TX	L 0–6	7,729	
October 3	McNeese State		Louisiana Tech Stadium; Ruston, LA	L 14–16	10,000	
October 10	at Southwestern Louisiana		McNaspy Stadium; Lafayette, LA (rivalry)	L 10–20	12,500	
October 17	at No. 1 Arkansas State*		Kays Stadium; Jonesboro, AR	L 17–38	8,300	
October 24	vs. Northwestern State		State Fair Stadium; Shreveport, LA (rivalry)	L 17–20	25,000	
October 31	No. 3 Tampa*		Louisiana Tech Stadium; Ruston, LA	L 10–14	10,000	
November 7	Southeastern Louisiana		Louisiana Tech Stadium; Ruston, LA	L 21–24	10,000	
November 14	at Southern Miss*		Faulkner Field; Hattiesburg, MS (rivalry)	W 27–6	14,000	
November 21	at Northeast Louisiana		Brown Stadium; Monroe, LA (rivalry)	L 21–28	8,400	
*Non-conference game; Rankings from AP Poll released prior to the game
