= 1970 Rhode Island Rams football team =

American college football season

1970 Rhode Island Rams football
- Conference: Yankee Conference
- Record: 3–5 (3–2 Yankee)
- Head coach: Jack Gregory (1st season)
- Home stadium: Meade Stadium

1970 Yankee Conference football standings
	Conf.					Overall
Team	W		L		T	W		L		T
Connecticut $	4	–	0	–	1	4	–	4	–	2
UMass	3	–	1	–	1	4	–	5	–	1
New Hampshire	3	–	2	–	0	5	–	3	–	0
Rhode Island	3	–	2	–	0	3	–	5	–	0
Maine	1	–	4	–	0	3	–	5	–	0
Vermont	0	–	5	–	0	0	–	9	–	0
$ – Conference champion

The 1970 Rhode Island Rams football team was an American football team that represented the University of Rhode Island as a member of the Yankee Conference during the 1970 NCAA College Division football season. In its first season under head coach Jack Gregory, the team compiled a 3–5 record (3–2 against conference opponents), tied for third place out of six teams in the Yankee Conference, and was outscored by a total of 178 to 125. The team played its home games at Meade Stadium in Kingston, Rhode Island.

== Schedule ==
Date	Opponent	Site	Result	Attendance	Source
September 26	at Brown*	Brown Stadium; Providence, RI (rivalry)	L 14–21	14,200–15,000	
October 3	at Maine	Alumni Field; Orono, ME	W 23–6	7,315	
October 10	Vermont	Meade Stadium; Kingston, RI	W 40–13	4,600	
October 17	UMass	Meade Stadium; Kingston, RI	W 14–7	8,000–9,700	
October 24	Boston University*	Meade Field; Kingston, RI	L 0–21	6,200–8,800	
October 31	at New Hampshire	Cowell Stadium; Durham, NH	L 7–59	10,053	
November 7	at Temple*	Temple Stadium; Philadelphia, PA	L 15–18	7,979–11,000	
November 14	at Connecticut	Memorial Stadium; Storrs, CT (rivalry)	L 12–33	16,464	
*Non-conference game
