= 1970 Vermont Catamounts football team =

American college football season

1970 Vermont Catamounts football
- Conference: Yankee Conference
- Record: 0–9 (0–5 Yankee)
- Head coach: Joe Scannella (1st season)
- Home stadium: Centennial Field

1970 Yankee Conference football standings
	Conf.					Overall
Team	W		L		T	W		L		T
Connecticut $	4	–	0	–	1	4	–	4	–	2
UMass	3	–	1	–	1	4	–	5	–	1
New Hampshire	3	–	2	–	0	5	–	3	–	0
Rhode Island	3	–	2	–	0	3	–	5	–	0
Maine	1	–	4	–	0	3	–	5	–	0
Vermont	0	–	5	–	0	0	–	9	–	0
$ – Conference champion

The 1970 Vermont Catamounts football team was an American football team that represented the University of Vermont in the Yankee Conference during the 1970 NCAA College Division football season. In their first year under head coach Joe Scannella, the team compiled an 0–9 record.

== Schedule ==
Date	Opponent	Site	Result	Attendance	Source
September 19	at Connecticut	Memorial Stadium; Storrs, CT	L 0–47	10,251	
September 26	Boston University*	Centennial Field; Burlington, VT	L 6–48	6,800	
October 3	at Northeastern*	Parsons Field; Brookline, MA	L 21–34	4,220	
October 10	at Rhode Island	Meade Stadium; Kingston, RI	L 13–40	4,600	
October 17	New Hampshire	Centennial Field; Burlington, VT	L 0–27	3,700	
October 24	Hofstra*	Centennial Field; Burlington, VT	L 19–34	2,700	
October 31	UMass	Centennial Field; Burlington, VT	L 6–48	2,700–3,300	
November 7	at Maine	Alumni Field; Orono, ME	L 21–28	4,978–5,000	
November 14	Lafayette*	Fisher Field; Easton, PA	L 14–31	4,000–6,000	
*Non-conference game
