= 1970 Grantland Rice Bowl =

Tennessee State Tigers	Southwestern Louisiana Bulldogs
(10–0)	(9–2)
Independent	Gulf States Conference
26	25
Head coach: John Merritt	Head coach: Russ Faulkinberry
	1	2	3	4	Total
Tennessee State	14	0	0	12	26
Southwestern Louisiana	0	12	0	13	25
- Date: December 12, 1970
- Season: 1970
- Stadium: BREC Memorial Stadium
- Location: Baton Rouge, Louisiana
- Attendance: 13,400

The 1970 Grantland Rice Bowl was an NCAA College Division game following the 1970 season, between the Tennessee State Tigers and the Southwestern Louisiana Bulldogs (now the Louisiana Ragin' Cajuns).

== Notable participants ==
Multiple players from Tennessee State were selected in the 1971 NFL draft, including offensive tackle Vernon Holland, defensive tackle Larry Woods, and wide receiver Dave Davis. Players later selected in the 1972 NFL draft include Tennessee State defensive back Clifford Brooks and quarterback Joe Gilliam, and Southwestern Louisiana guard Louis Age. Tennessee State freshman defensive end Ed "Too Tall" Jones would be the number one pick in the 1974 NFL draft.

Tennessee State head coach John Merritt was inducted to the College Football Hall of Fame in 1994.

== Scoring summary ==
Scoring summary

Quarter	Time	Drive			Team	Scoring information	Score	
Quarter	Time	Plays	Yards	TOP	Team	Scoring information	TSU	USL
1					TSU	Maceo Coleman 18-yard touchdown reception from Joe Gilliam, Alfred Reese kick good	7	0
1	0:30				TSU	Alfred Reese 63-yard touchdown reception from Joe Gilliam, Alfred Reese kick good	14	0
2					USL	Nelson Schnexnayder 6-yard touchdown reception from George Coussan, Roy Pendergraft kick failed	14	6
2					USL	Robert Gill 4-yard touchdown run, 2-point pass failed	14	12
4	8:57	4	18		USL	Nelson Schnexnayder 17-yard touchdown reception from George Coussan, Roy Pendergraft kick good	14	19
4	8:52				USL	Mike Courville recovered kickoff in the TSU end zone, Roy Pendergraft kick failed	14	25
4					TSU	Joe Gilliam 3-yard touchdown run, 2-point run failed	20	25
4	3:22				TSU	Albert Davis 5-yard touchdown run, 2-point pass failed	26	25
"TOP" = time of possession. For other American football terms, see Glossary of American football.							26	25
