= 1970 Prairie View A&M Panthers football team =

American college football season

1970 Prairie View A&M Panthers football
- Conference: Southwestern Athletic Conference
- Record: 4–5–1 (2–3–1 SWAC)
- Head coach: Alexander Durley (2nd season)
- Home stadium: Edward L. Blackshear Field

1970 Southwestern Athletic Conference football standings
	Conf.					Overall
Team	W		L		T	W		L		T
No. 7/9 Alcorn A&M $	6	–	0	–	0	8	–	1	–	0
No. 13/16 Grambling	5	–	1	–	0	9	–	2	–	0
Texas Southern	4	–	2	–	0	6	–	3	–	0
Southern	2	–	3	–	1	5	–	5	–	1
Prairie View A&M	2	–	3	–	1	4	–	5	–	1
Jackson State	1	–	5	–	0	4	–	7	–	0
Mississippi Valley State	0	–	6	–	0	1	–	8	–	0
$ – Conference champion; Rankings from NAIA Division I poll and AP small college poll

The 1970 Prairie View A&M Panthers football team represented Prairie View A&M College of Texas (now known as Prairie View A&M University) as a member of the Southwestern Athletic Conference (SWAC) during the 1970 NCAA College Division football season. Led by second-year head coach Alexander Durley, the Panthers compiled an overall record of 4–5–1, with a conference record of 2–3–1, and finished tied for fourth in the SWAC.

== Schedule ==
Date	Opponent	Site	Result	Attendance	Source
September 12	at McMurry*	Shotwell Stadium; Abilene, TX	L 13–30		
September 19	at Jackson State	Mississippi Veterans Memorial Stadium; Jackson, MS	W 14–7		
September 26	at Southern	University Stadium; Baton Rouge, LA	T 13–13	13,026	
October 3	vs. Grambling	Comiskey Park; Chicago, IL (rivalry)	L 6–57	23,000	
October 17	Lane*	Edward L. Blackshear Field; Prairie View, TX	W 35–6		
October 24	at Bishop*	Cotton Bowl; Dallas, TX	W 29–26		
October 31	Mississippi Valley State	Edward L. Blackshear Field; Prairie View, TX	W 38–17		
November 7	at Texas Lutheran*	Matador Stadium; Seguin, TX	L 3–10		
November 14	No. 15 Alcorn A&M	Edward L. Blackshear Field; Prairie View, TX	L 3–27		
November 26	at Texas Southern	Astrodome; Houston, TX (rivalry)	L 7–17		
*Non-conference game; Rankings from AP Poll released prior to the game
