= 1970 Wittenberg Tigers football team =

American college football season

1970 Wittenberg Tigers football

OAC co-champion (vacated)
- Conference: Ohio Athletic Conference
- Record: 9–0 (5–0 OAC)
- Head coach: Dave Maurer (2nd season)

1970 Ohio Athletic Conference football standings
	Conf.					Overall
Team	W		L		T	W		L		T
Capital +	6	–	0	–	0	8	–	1	–	0
No. 17 Wittenberg +	5	–	0	–	0	9	–	0	–	0
Wooster	5	–	1	–	0	7	–	2	–	0
Muskingum	5	–	1	–	0	7	–	2	–	0
Mount Union	4	–	1	–	0	8	–	1	–	0
Denison	3	–	4	–	0	5	–	4	–	0
Marietta	3	–	4	–	0	4	–	5	–	0
Baldwin–Wallace	2	–	3	–	0	6	–	3	–	0
Kenyon	2	–	4	–	0	5	–	4	–	0
Heidelberg	2	–	5	–	0	3	–	6	–	0
Hiram	2	–	5	–	0	2	–	6	–	0
Otterbein	2	–	5	–	0	2	–	7	–	0
Ohio Wesleyan	1	–	5	–	0	2	–	7	–	0
Oberlin	0	–	5	–	0	2	–	6	–	0
+ – Conference co-champions; Rankings from AP small college poll

The 1970 Wittenberg Tigers football team was an American football team that represented Wittenberg University in the Ohio Athletic Conference (OAC) during the 1970 NCAA College Division football season. In their second year under head coach Dave Maurer, the Tigers compiled a perfect 9–0 record (5–0 against OAC opponents) and shared the OAC championship with Capital. The team led the nation's small colleges with an average of 40 points per game. The 1970 season was Wittenberg's second consecutive undefeated season.

Eight Wittenberg players were selected as first-team players on the all-Ohio Athletic Conference football team.

After the season, the OAC forfeited all nine of Wittenberg's victories after Wittenberg's administration disclosed that senior offensive tackle Rick Mako had not registered for classes and was therefore ineligible. Wittenberg claimed that its faculty and staff were unaware that Mako had not registered and was not attending classes. Mako stated unpaid bills from the prior academic year prevented him from registering on time and that he panicked, claiming it was "just a mix-up."

== Schedule ==
Date	Opponent	Site	Result	Attendance	Source
September 19	at California (PA)*	California, PA	W 61–0		
September 28	Central State (OH)*	Wittenberg Stadium; Springield, OH	W 40–0		
October 3	Otterbein	Wittenberg Stadium; Springield, OH	W 76–0		
October 10	at Denison	Granville, OH	W 30–0		
October 17	Findlay*	Wittenberg Stadium; Springield, OH	W 48–0		
October 24	at Baldwin–Wallace	Berea, OH	W 21–14		
October 31	Ohio Wesleyan	Wittenberg Stadium; Springield, OH	W 35–0		
November 7	at Wooster	Wooster, OH	W 35–0		
November 14	Ashland*	Wittenberg Stadium; Springield, OH	W 14–6	3,500	
*Non-conference game
