= 1970 Connecticut Huskies football team =

American college football season

1970 Connecticut Huskies football

Yankee Conference champion
- Conference: Yankee Conference
- Record: 4–4–2 (4–0–1 Yankee)
- Head coach: John Toner (5th season)
- Home stadium: Memorial Stadium

1970 Yankee Conference football standings
	Conf.					Overall
Team	W		L		T	W		L		T
Connecticut $	4	–	0	–	1	4	–	4	–	2
UMass	3	–	1	–	1	4	–	5	–	1
New Hampshire	3	–	2	–	0	5	–	3	–	0
Rhode Island	3	–	2	–	0	3	–	5	–	0
Maine	1	–	4	–	0	3	–	5	–	0
Vermont	0	–	5	–	0	0	–	9	–	0
$ – Conference champion

The 1970 Connecticut Huskies football team represented the University of Connecticut in the 1970 NCAA College Division football season. The Huskies were led by fifth-year head coach John Toner, and completed the season with a record of 4–4–1.

== Schedule ==
Date	Opponent	Site	Result	Attendance	Source
September 19	Vermont	Memorial Stadium; Storrs, CT	W 47–0	10,251	
September 26	at Yale*	Yale Bowl; New Haven, CT	L 0–10	34,974	
October 3	at New Hampshire	Cowell Stadium; Durham, NH	W 27–14	9,872	
October 10	at Temple*	Temple Stadium; Philadelphia, PA	L 23–41	8,126–8,500	
October 17	Maine	Memorial Stadium; Storrs, CT	W 45–13	12,478	
October 24	at UMass	Alumni Stadium; Amherst, MA (rivalry)	T 21–21	14,600	
October 31	Boston University*	Memorial Stadium; Storrs, CT	L 9–34	14,006	
November 7	at William & Mary*	Cary Field; Williamsburg, VA	L 15–28	7,000	
November 14	Rhode Island	Memorial Stadium; Storrs, CT (rivalry)	W 33–12	16,464	
November 21	at Holy Cross*	Fitton Field; Worcester, MA	T 20–20	6,818–7,000	
*Non-conference game

== After the season ==
=== NFL draft ===
The following Husky was drafted into the National Football League following the season.

Round	Pick	Player	Position	NFL club
4	102	Vince Clements	Running back	Minnesota Vikings
