= 1970 Southwestern Louisiana Bulldogs football team =

American college football season

1970 Southwestern Louisiana Bulldogs football

GSC champion

Grantland Rice Bowl, L 25–26 vs. Tennessee State
- Conference: Gulf States Conference
- Record: 9–3 (5–0 GSC)
- Head coach: Russ Faulkinberry (10th season)
- Home stadium: McNaspy Stadium

1970 Gulf States Conference football standings
	Conf.					Overall
Team	W		L		T	W		L		T
Southwestern Louisiana $	5	–	0	–	0	9	–	2	–	0
Northwestern State	3	–	2	–	0	7	–	3	–	0
Northeast Louisiana	3	–	2	–	0	5	–	4	–	0
McNeese State	2	–	3	–	0	5	–	6	–	0
Southeastern Louisiana	2	–	3	–	0	4	–	6	–	0
Louisiana Tech	0	–	5	–	0	2	–	8	–	0
$ – Conference champion

The 1970 Southwestern Louisiana Bulldogs football team was an American football team that represented the University of Southwestern Louisiana (now known as the University of Louisiana at Lafayette) in the Gulf States Conference during the 1970 NCAA College Division football season. In their tenth year under head coach Russ Faulkinberry, the team compiled an 9–3 record and were Gulf States Conference champions.

== Schedule ==
Date	Opponent	Rank	Site	Result	Attendance	Source
September 12	Southern Miss*		McNaspy Stadium; Lafayette, LA	L 14–16	11,000	
September 19	Southeastern Louisiana		McNaspy Stadium; Lafayette, LA (Cypress Mug)	W 17–6	12,000	
September 26	at Chattanooga*		Chamberlain Field; Chattanooga, TN	W 24–20	7,500	
October 3	Doane*		McNaspy Stadium; Lafayette, LA	W 49–0	11,000	
October 10	Louisiana Tech		McNaspy Stadium; Lafayette, LA (rivalry)	W 20–10	12,500	
October 17	at UT Arlington*	No. T–13	Memorial Stadium; Arlington, TX	W 28–7	4,000	
October 24	Lamar Tech*	No. 13	McNaspy Stadium; Lafayette, LA (Sabine Shoe)	W 15–6	11,000–12,000	
October 31	at Northeast Louisiana	No. 9	Brown Stadium; Monroe, LA (rivalry)	W 9–7	8,200	
November 7	No. 4 Tampa*	No. 7	McNaspy Stadium; Lafayette, LA	L 38–50	15,000	
November 14	at Northwestern State	No. 17	Demon Stadium; Natchitoches, LA	W 24–21	7,800	
November 21	at McNeese State	No. 12	Cowboy Stadium; Lake Charles, LA (Cajun Crown)	W 13–7	14,000	
December 12	vs. No. 5 Tennessee State*	No. 10	BREC Memorial Stadium; Baton Rouge, LA (Grantland Rice Bowl)	L 25–26	17,000	
*Non-conference game; Rankings from AP Poll released prior to the game
