= 1970 Southern Jaguars football team =

American college football season

1970 Southern Jaguars football
- Conference: Southwestern Athletic Conference
- Record: 5–5–1 (2–3–1 SWAC)
- Head coach: Alva Tabor (2nd season)
- Home stadium: University Stadium

1970 Southwestern Athletic Conference football standings
	Conf.					Overall
Team	W		L		T	W		L		T
No. 7/9 Alcorn A&M $	6	–	0	–	0	8	–	1	–	0
No. 13/16 Grambling	5	–	1	–	0	9	–	2	–	0
Texas Southern	4	–	2	–	0	6	–	3	–	0
Southern	2	–	3	–	1	5	–	5	–	1
Prairie View A&M	2	–	3	–	1	4	–	5	–	1
Jackson State	1	–	5	–	0	4	–	7	–	0
Mississippi Valley State	0	–	6	–	0	1	–	8	–	0
$ – Conference champion; Rankings from NAIA Division I poll and AP small college poll

The 1970 Southern Jaguars football team represented Southern University as a member of the Southwestern Athletic Conference (SWAC) during the 1970 NCAA College Division football season. Led by second-year head coach Alva Tabor, the Jaguars compiled an overall record of 5–5–1, with a conference record of 2–3–1, and finished tied for fourth in the SWAC.

== Schedule ==
Date	Opponent	Site	Result	Attendance	Source
September 11	vs. North Carolina A&T*	Yankee Stadium; Bronx, NY (Football Coaches Foundation Classic)	W 21–6	25,000–29,125	
September 19	at Texas Southern	Jeppesen Stadium; Houston, TX	L 6–29	14,000	
September 26	Prairie View A&M	University Stadium; Baton Rouge, LA	T 13–13	13,026	
October 3	at Mississippi Valley State	Magnolia Stadium; Itta Bena, MS	W 20–0		
October 10	at Arkansas AM&N*	Pine Bluff, AR	W 17–10		
October 17	Jackson State	University Stadium; Baton Rouge, LA (rivalry)	W 27–14	23,242	
October 24	at No. 19 Alcorn A&M	Henderson Stadium; Lorman, MS	L 0–14	6,600	
October 31	at No. 5 Tennessee State*	Hale Stadium; Nashville, TN	L 7–38	11,000–14,000	
November 14	vs. Florida A&M*	Tulane Stadium; New Orleans, LA (Urban League of GNO Classic)	W 40–19	31,950	
November 21	Grambling	University Stadium; Baton Rouge, LA (rivalry)	L 24–37	35,118	
November 28	vs. Cal State Hayward*	Oakland–Alameda County Coliseum; Oakland, CA	L 6–20	24,092–24,105	
*Non-conference game; Rankings from AP Poll released prior to the game
