= 1970 Texas Southern Tigers football team =

American college football season

1970 Texas Southern Tigers football
- Conference: Southwestern Athletic Conference
- Record: 6–3 (4–2 SWAC)
- Head coach: Alfred Benefield (1st season)
- Home stadium: Astrodome; Jeppesen Stadium

1970 Southwestern Athletic Conference football standings
	Conf.					Overall
Team	W		L		T	W		L		T
No. 7/9 Alcorn A&M $	6	–	0	–	0	8	–	1	–	0
No. 13/16 Grambling	5	–	1	–	0	9	–	2	–	0
Texas Southern	4	–	2	–	0	6	–	3	–	0
Southern	2	–	3	–	1	5	–	5	–	1
Prairie View A&M	2	–	3	–	1	4	–	5	–	1
Jackson State	1	–	5	–	0	4	–	7	–	0
Mississippi Valley State	0	–	6	–	0	1	–	8	–	0
$ – Conference champion; Rankings from NAIA Division I poll and AP small college poll

The 1970 Texas Southern Tigers football team was an American football team that represented Texas Southern University as a member of the Southwestern Athletic Conference (SWAC) during the 1970 NCAA College Division football season. Led by first-year head coach Alfred Benefield, the Tigers compiled an overall record of 6–3, with a mark of 4–2 in conference play, and finished third in the SWAC.

== Schedule ==
Date	Opponent	Site	Result	Attendance	Source
September 19	Southern	Jeppesen Stadium; Houston, TX	W 29–6	14,000	
October 3	at No. 10 Tennessee State*	Hale Stadium; Nashville, TN	L 9–41	11,000	
October 10	at Alcorn A&M	Henderson Stadium; Lorman, MS	L 7–44		
October 17	Bishop*	Jeppesen Stadium; Houston, TX	W 32–20		
October 24	Mississippi Valley State	Jeppesen Stadium; Houston, TX	W 20–7		
October 31	Grambling	Astrodome; Houston, TX	L 16–20		
November 7	at Jackson State	Mississippi Veterans Memorial Stadium; Jackson, MS	W 27–21	9,172	
November 14	Langston*	Jeppesen Stadium; Houston, TX	W 23–0	3,000	
November 26	Prairie View A&M	Astrodome; Houston, TX (rivalry)	W 17–7		
*Non-conference game; Rankings from AP Poll released prior to the game
