= 1970 Grambling Tigers football team =

American college football season

1970 Grambling Tigers football
- Conference: Southwestern Athletic Conference
- Record: 9–2 (5–1 SWAC)
- Head coach: Eddie Robinson (28th season)
- Home stadium: Grambling Stadium

1970 Southwestern Athletic Conference football standings
	Conf.					Overall
Team	W		L		T	W		L		T
No. 7/9 Alcorn A&M $	6	–	0	–	0	8	–	1	–	0
No. 13/16 Grambling	5	–	1	–	0	9	–	2	–	0
Texas Southern	4	–	2	–	0	6	–	3	–	0
Southern	2	–	3	–	1	5	–	5	–	1
Prairie View A&M	2	–	3	–	1	4	–	5	–	1
Jackson State	1	–	5	–	0	4	–	7	–	0
Mississippi Valley State	0	–	6	–	0	1	–	8	–	0
$ – Conference champion; Rankings from NAIA Division I poll and AP small college poll

The 1970 Grambling Tigers football team represented Grambling College (now known as Grambling State University) as a member of the Southwestern Athletic Conference (SWAC) during the 1970 NCAA College Division football season. Led by 28th-year head coach Eddie Robinson, the Tigers compiled an overall record of 9–2 and a mark of 5–1 in conference play, and finished second in the SWAC.

== Schedule ==
Date	Opponent	Site	Result	Attendance	Source
September 12	vs. Morgan State*	Three Rivers Stadium; Pittsburgh, PA (Renaissance Football Classic)	W 38–12	14,000	
September 19	Alcorn A&M	Grambling Stadium; Grambling, LA	L 7–10		
October 3	vs. Prairie View A&M	Comiskey Park; Chicago, IL (rivalry)	W 57–6	23,000	
October 10	No. 6 Tennessee State*	Grambling Stadium; Grambling, LA	L 27–34	12,000	
October 17	vs. Mississippi Valley State	Tiger Stadium; Detroit, MI (Black Charities Football Classic)	W 41–17	26,673	
October 24	vs. Jackson State	Municipal Stadium; Cleveland, OH ('70 Classic)	W 27–7	24,000	
October 31	at Texas Southern	Houston Astrodome; Houston, TX	W 20–16		
November 7	Arkansas AM&N	Grambling Stadium; Grambling, LA	W 41–13		
November 14	Norfolk State*	Grambling Stadium; Grambling, LA	W 55–13		
November 21	at Southern	University Stadium; Baton Rouge, LA (rivalry)	W 37–24	35,118	
November 28	Cal State Fullerton*	Grambling Stadium; Grambling, LA	W 34–31	1,000	
*Non-conference game; Rankings from AP Poll released prior to the game
