= 1970 Tennessee State Tigers football team =

American college football season

1970 Tennessee State Tigers football

Black college football national champion

Grantland Rice Bowl, W 26–25 vs. Southwestern Louisiana
- Conference: Independent
- Record: 10–0
- Head coach: John Merritt (8th season)
- Home stadium: Hale Stadium

1970 NCAA College Division independents football records
	Conf.			Overall
Team	W	L	T	W		L		T
No. 4 Tampa		–		10	–	1	–	0
No. 5 Tennessee State		–		10	–	0	–	0
No. 11 Delaware		–		9	–	2	–	0
Hawaii		–		9	–	2	–	0
Northern Michigan		–		8	–	2	–	0
No. 19 Eastern Michigan		–		7	–	2	–	1
Mankato State		–		7	–	2	–	1
Akron		–		7	–	3	–	0
Central Michigan		–		7	–	3	–	0
Temple		–		7	–	3	–	0
Drake		–		7	–	4	–	0
Wayne State (MI)		–		6	–	2	–	0
Arkansas AM&N		–		6	–	3	–	0
Southern Illinois		–		6	–	3	–	0
St. Norbert		–		6	–	3	–	0
Nevada		–		6	–	3	–	1
Portland State		–		6	–	4	–	0
UNLV		–		6	–	4	–	0
Boston University		–		5	–	4	–	0
Cortland		–		5	–	4	–	0
Indiana (PA)		–		5	–	4	–	0
Santa Clara		–		5	–	4	–	1
Lafayette		–		6	–	5	–	0
Colorado College		–		4	–	4	–	0
Drexel		–		4	–	4	–	0
Hofstra		–		5	–	5	–	0
Indiana State		–		5	–	5	–	0
Samford		–		5	–	5	–	0
Wabash		–		3	–	3	–	2
Saint Mary's		–		3	–	4	–	0
Ashland		–		4	–	6	–	0
Bucknell		–		4	–	6	–	0
Lehigh		–		4	–	6	–	0
Rose Poly		–		3	–	5	–	1
Northeastern		–		3	–	5	–	0
Indiana Central		–		3	–	6	–	0
Lake Forest		–		3	–	6	–	0
Kentucky State		–		3	–	6	–	0
Chicago		–		2	–	5	–	0
Chattanooga		–		3	–	8	–	0
Parsons		–		2	–	7	–	0
Eastern Illinois		–		2	–	8	–	0
Milwaukee		–		1	–	9	–	0
Rankings from AP small college poll

The 1970 Tennessee State Tigers football team represented Tennessee State University as an independent during the 1970 NCAA College Division football season. In their eighth season under head coach John Merritt, the Tigers compiled a perfect 10–0 record, defeated Southwestern Louisiana in the 1970 Grantland Rice Bowl, and outscored all opponents by a total of 396 to 144. The team was also recognized as the 1970 black college national champion and was ranked No. 5 in the final small college rankings issued by both the Associated Press and United Press International.

Tackle Vernon Holland received first-team honors on the 1970 Little All-America college football team.

== Schedule ==
Date	Opponent	Rank	Site	Result	Attendance	Source
September 11	vs. Alcorn A&M		Los Angeles Memorial Coliseum; Los Angeles, CA (Freedom Classic)	W 24–14	43,772	
September 19	vs. Kentucky State		Crump Stadium; Memphis, TN	W 62–7	15,000	
September 26	vs. Albany State	No. 10	Porter Stadium; Macon, GA (Central City Classic)	W 54–7	8,000	
October 3	Texas Southern	No. 10	Hale Stadium; Nashville, TN	W 41–9	11,000	
October 10	at Grambling	No. 6	Grambling Stadium; Grambling, LA	W 34–27	12,000	
October 24	at Florida A&M	No. 5	Bragg Memorial Stadium; Tallahassee, FL	W 21–10	13,500-14,000	
October 31	Southern	No. 5	Hale Stadium; Nashville, TN	W 38–7	11,000–14,000	
November 7	Morris Brown	No. 6	Hale Stadium; Nashville, TN	W 36–14	9,000	
November 21	vs. Parsons	No. 5	Busch Memorial Stadium; St. Louis, MO (Gateway Classic)	W 21–3	7,000	
November 26	Bishop	No. 4	Hale Stadium; Nashville, TN	W 39–21	12,000	
December 12	vs. No. 10 Southwestern Louisiana	No. 5	Memorial Stadium; Baton Rouge, LA (Grantland Rice Bowl)	W 26–25	17,000	
Rankings from AP Poll released prior to the game
