= 1970 Alcorn A&M Braves football team =

American college football season

1970 Alcorn A&M Braves football

SWAC champion
- Conference: Southwestern Athletic Conference

Ranking
- AP: No. 9
- Record: 8–1 (6–0 SWAC)
- Head coach: Marino Casem (7th season)
- Home stadium: Henderson Stadium

1970 Southwestern Athletic Conference football standings
	Conf.					Overall
Team	W		L		T	W		L		T
No. 7/9 Alcorn A&M $	6	–	0	–	0	8	–	1	–	0
No. 13/16 Grambling	5	–	1	–	0	9	–	2	–	0
Texas Southern	4	–	2	–	0	6	–	3	–	0
Southern	2	–	3	–	1	5	–	5	–	1
Prairie View A&M	2	–	3	–	1	4	–	5	–	1
Jackson State	1	–	5	–	0	4	–	7	–	0
Mississippi Valley State	0	–	6	–	0	1	–	8	–	0
$ – Conference champion; Rankings from NAIA Division I poll and AP small college poll

The 1970 Alcorn A&M Braves football team represented Alcorn A&M College (now known as Alcorn State University) as a member of the Southwestern Athletic Conference (SWAC) during the 1970 NCAA College Division football season. Led by seventh-year head coach Marino Casem, the Braves compiled an overall record of 8–1, with a conference record of 6–0, and finished as SWAC champion.

== Schedule ==
Date	Opponent	Rank	Site	Result	Attendance	Source
September 11	vs. Tennessee State*		Los Angeles Memorial Coliseum; Los Angeles, CA (Freedom Classic)	L 14–24	43,772	
September 19	at Grambling		Grambling Stadium; Grambling, LA	W 10–7		
September 26	vs. North Carolina Central*		John F. Kennedy Stadium; Philadelphia, PA (National Black Unity Football Classic)	W 27–0	25,000	
October 3	at Savannah State*		Ted Wright Stadium; Savannah, GA	W 34–6		
October 10	Texas Southern		Henderson Stadium; Lorman, MS	W 44–7		
October 24	Southern	No. 19	Henderson Stadium; Lorman, MS	W 14–0	6,600	
November 7	at Mississippi Valley State	No. 13	Magnolia Stadium; Itta Bena, MS	W 40–14		
November 14	at Prairie View A&M	No. 15	Blackshear Field; Prairie View, TX	W 27–3		
November 26	at Jackson State	No. 9	Mississippi Veterans Memorial Stadium; Jackson, MS (rivalry)	W 30–11		
*Non-conference game; Rankings from AP Poll released prior to the game
