= 1970 St. Olaf Oles football team =

American college football season

1970 St. Olaf Oles football

MWC champion
- Conference: Midwest Conference

Ranking
- AP: No. 18 (small college)
- Record: 9–0 (8–0 MWC)
- Head coach: Tom Porter (12th season)
- MVP: Ole Gunderson

1970 Midwest Conference football standings
	Conf.					Overall
Team	W		L		T	W		L		T
No. 18 St. Olaf $	8	–	0	–	0	9	–	0	–	0
Monmouth (IL)	7	–	1	–	0	8	–	1	–	0
Knox	5	–	3	–	0	6	–	3	–	0
Ripon	5	–	3	–	0	6	–	3	–	0
Grinnell	4	–	4	–	0	5	–	4	–	0
Cornell (IA)	3	–	5	–	0	4	–	5	–	0
Coe	2	–	6	–	0	3	–	6	–	0
Lawrence	2	–	6	–	0	3	–	6	–	0
Carleton	0	–	8	–	0	1	–	8	–	0
Beloit			–			0	–	9	–	0
$ – Conference champion; Beloit was allowed to compete with freshmen. Games with Beloit were not counted in the conference standings.; Rankings from AP small college poll

The 1970 St. Olaf Oles football team was an American football team that represented St. Olaf College of Northfield, Minnesota as a member of the Midwest Conference (MWC) during the 1970 NAIA Division II football season. In their 12th season under head coach Tom Porter, the Oles compiled a perfect 9–0 record (8–0 against MWC teams), won the MWC championship, and outscored opponents by a total of 312 to 132.

Back Ole Gunderson was selected as the Oles' most valuable player. He led the Midwest Conference in 1970 with 86 points scored (14 touchdowns and a two-point conversion). He also led the conference in 1969 with 132 points scored. He once rushed for 356 yards in a game, rushed for over 4,000 yards in three years at St. Olaf, was inducted into the St. Olaf Athletic Hall of Fame in 1998, and had his jersey (No. 25) retired by St. Olaf in 2002.

== Schedule ==
Date	Opponent	Rank	Site	Result	Attendance	Source
September 19	Lawrence		Northfield, MN	W 14–0		
September 26	at Coe		Kingston Stadium; Cedar Rapids, IA	W 26–10		
October 3	Beloit*		Northfield, MN	W 55–13		
October 10	Cornell (IA)		Northfield, MN	W 28–14		
October 17	at Ripon	No. 19	Ripon, WI	W 27–21		
October 24	Carleton		Northfield, MN	W 30–13		
October 31	Knox	No. 17	Northfield, MN	W 56–22		
November 7	at Grinnell	No. 17	Grinnell, IA	W 35–7		
November 14	at Monmouth	No. 13	Monmouth, IL	W 41–32		
*Non-conference game; Rankings from AP Poll released prior to the game
