= 1970 Whitewater State Warhawks football team =

American college football season

1970 Whitewater State Warhawks football
- Conference: Wisconsin State University Conference
- Record: 6–4 (5–3 WSUC)
- Head coach: Forrest Perkins (15th season)
- Home stadium: Warhawks Stadium

1970 Wisconsin State University Conference football standings
	Conf.					Overall
Team	W		L		T	W		L		T
No. 3 Platteville State $^	8	–	0	–	0	10	–	1	–	0
Eau Claire State	5	–	3	–	0	6	–	4	–	0
Whitewater State	5	–	3	–	0	6	–	4	–	0
Oshkosh State	5	–	3	–	0	5	–	5	–	0
Superior State	5	–	3	–	0	5	–	5	–	0
La Crosse State	4	–	3	–	1	5	–	4	–	1
Stout State	2	–	6	–	0	3	–	7	–	0
Stevens Point State	1	–	6	–	1	1	–	8	–	1
River Falls State	0	–	8	–	0	1	–	8	–	0
$ – Conference champion; ^ – NAIA Division I playoff participant; Rankings from NAIA Division I poll

The 1970 Whitewater State Warhawks football team represented Wisconsin State University—Whitewater—now known as the University of Wisconsin–Whitewater—as a member of the Wisconsin State University Conference (WSUC) during the 1970 NAIA football season. In their fifteenth year under coach Forrest Perkins, the Warhawks compiled an overall record of 6–4, with a 5–3 mark in conference play, placing third in the WSUC.

The 1970 season was the team's first in Warhawks Stadium, which was later renamed in honor of Coach Perkins. The stadium was dedicated with a Neil Diamond concert on September 11, the night before Whitewater State's first home game.

== Schedule ==
Date	Opponent	Site	Result	Attendance	Source
September 12	Trinity (TX)*	Warhawks Stadium; Whitewater, WI	L 10–35	6,500–9,000	
September 19	Stevens Point State	Warhawks Stadium; Whitewater, WI	W 27–3		
September 26	at Stout State	Menomonie, WI	W 28–7		
October 3	at Platteville State	Platteville, WI	L 0–27		
October 10	Superior State	Warhawks Stadium; Whitewater, WI	W 35–0		
October 17	at St. Norbert*	De Pere, WI	W 23–20		
October 24	at Eau Claire State	Eau Claire, WI	L 0–10		
October 31	River Falls State^{†}	Warhawks Stadium; Whitewater, WI	W 58–2	7,111	
November 7	La Crosse State	Warhawks Stadium; Whitewater, WI	L 7–15		
November 14	at Oshkosh State	Oshkosh, WI	W 19–17		
*Non-conference game; ^{†}Homecoming

== Roster ==
1970 Wisconsin–Whitewater Warhawks football team roster
Players
Coaches
Offense

Pos.	#	Name	Class
QB	10	Roger Toole	So
QB	11	Jeff Koconis	So
QB	16	Ron Dums	Sr
RB	22	Bob Kincaid	So
RB	23	Steve Hanaman	Sr
RB	24	Tom Hauser	Sr
RB	27	Scott Lauritzen	Fr
FB	30	Dick Ruetz	Fr
RB	33	Tom Wise	Fr
FB	35	Jim Conrey	So
RB	36	Brian Wilson	Jr
FB	42	Mike Weber	Jr
RB	44	Dennis Uloth	So
RB	46	Mike Neary	So
RB	47	Ken Nyberg	So
G	52	Tim Gallagher	Fr
C	53	Greg Vike	So
C	54	Jim Lile	Jr
C	55	Jim Plautz	So
G	64	Tom Konowalski	Sr
G	65	Bill Ruetz	Jr
G	66	Howard Bailey	Jr
G	67	Rick David	Fr
G	68	Pat Lederer	So
OT	71	Tom Zarzycki	So
G	73	Jerry Cunningham	So
OT	74	Kirk Behrendt	Sr
OT	75	Al Thies	So
OT	76	Keith Landwehr	Fr
OT	77	John Dressler	So
OT	78	John White	So
TE	80	Jack Synold	So
WR	83	Mark Dennis	Fr
TE	85	Tom Schultz	Jr
DE	86	Frank Wipple	So
WR	87	Mike Dresselr	Jr
WR	88	Dick Bilda	So

Defense

Pos.	#	Name	Class
DB	15	Mike Yankunas	Jr
LB	32	Lon Kolstad	Sr
DB	34	Gary McNett	So
DB	38	Jim Reynolds	Fr
DB	39	Bob Phalon	So
DB	40	Ralph Bishop	So
DB	41	Jim Haubenchild	So
DB	43	Norm Bronson	So
DB	45	Steve Austin	Jr
DG	50	Mike Lederer	Jr
DG	51	Mike Zellmer	So
LB	59	Barry Borchart	So
DG	60	Charles Johnikin	So
DB	61	Ed Robertson	So
LB	62	Larry Shissler	So
LB	63	Joe Solis	So
DT	69	Bob Koldon	Fr
DT	70	Dennis Tuszynski	So
DT	72	Toby Ackerman	So
DT	79	Fred Olson	So
DE	81	Greg Badger	So
DE	82	Al Zinke	So
DT	84	Gary Phillips	So
DE	89	John Donahoe	So
DT	90	Dan Christensen	So

Special teams

Pos.	#	Name	Class

Head coach

- Forrest Perkins

Coordinators/assistant coaches

Legend

- (C) Team captain
- (S) Suspended
- (I) Ineligible
- Injured
- Redshirt
