= 1970 UMass Redmen football team =

American college football season

1970 UMass Redmen football
- Conference: Yankee Conference
- Record: 4–5–1 (3–1–1 Yankee)
- Head coach: Vic Fusia (10th season)
- Home stadium: Alumni Stadium

1970 Yankee Conference football standings
	Conf.					Overall
Team	W		L		T	W		L		T
Connecticut $	4	–	0	–	1	4	–	4	–	2
UMass	3	–	1	–	1	4	–	5	–	1
New Hampshire	3	–	2	–	0	5	–	3	–	0
Rhode Island	3	–	2	–	0	3	–	5	–	0
Maine	1	–	4	–	0	3	–	5	–	0
Vermont	0	–	5	–	0	0	–	9	–	0
$ – Conference champion

The 1970 UMass Redmen football team represented the University of Massachusetts Amherst in the 1970 NCAA College Division football season as a member of the Yankee Conference. The team was coached by Vic Fusia and played its home games at Alumni Stadium in Hadley, Massachusetts. The 1970 season was the last season in which Fusia coached the Redmen. UMass finished the season with a record of 4–5–1 overall and 3–1–1 in conference play.

== Schedule ==
Date	Time	Opponent	Site	Result	Attendance	Source
September 19		Maine	Alumni Stadium; Hadley, MA	W 28–0	12,000	
September 26		at Dartmouth*	Memorial Field; Hanover, NH	L 0–27	8,888	
October 3	1:30 p.m.	at Buffalo*	Rotary Field; Buffalo, NY (rivalry)	L 13–16	6,202–6,206	
October 10		Boston University*	Alumni Stadium; Hadley, MA	L 10–13	9,500	
October 17		at Rhode Island	Meade Stadium; Kingston, RI	L 7–14	8,000–9,700	
October 24		Connecticut^{†}	Alumni Stadium; Hadley, MA (rivalry)	T 21–21	14,600	
October 31		at Vermont	Centennial Field; Burlington, VT	W 48–6	2,700–3,300	
November 7		at Holy Cross*	Fitton Field; Worcester, MA	W 29–13	12,881	
November 14		New Hampshire	Alumni Stadium; Hadley, MA (rivalry)	W 24–14	12,200	
November 21		Boston College*	Alumni Stadium; Hadley, MA (rivalry)	L 10–21	17,200	
*Non-conference game; ^{†}Homecoming; All times are in Eastern time
