= 1970 Delaware State Hornets football team =

American college football season

1970 Delaware State Hornets football
- Conference: Central Intercollegiate Athletic Association
- Northern Division
- Record: 6–2 (4–1 CIAA)
- Head coach: Arnold Jeter (4th season)
- Home stadium: Alumni Stadium

1970 Central Intercollegiate Athletic Association football standings
	Conf.					Overall
Team	W		L		T	W		L		T
Northern Division
Morgan State x	5	–	0	–	0	8	–	2	–	0
No. 16 Virginia State y$	5	–	1	–	0	8	–	2	–	0
Delaware State	4	–	1	–	0	6	–	2	–	0
Howard	3	–	2	–	0	7	–	2	–	0
Saint Paul's (VA)	1	–	1	–	0	3	–	5	–	0
Norfolk State	2	–	3	–	0	3	–	6	–	0
Virginia Union	1	–	4	–	0	3	–	6	–	0
Maryland Eastern Shore	1	–	5	–	0	1	–	8	–	0
Hampton	0	–	5	–	0	0	–	9	–	0
Southern Division
No. 17 Johnson C. Smith xy	6	–	0	–	0	8	–	2	–	0
Elizabeth City State	4	–	1	–	0	6	–	3	–	0
North Carolina Central	3	–	1	–	0	5	–	4	–	0
Shaw	3	–	2	–	1	3	–	5	–	1
Fayetteville State	1	–	3	–	1	3	–	5	–	1
Livingstone	1	–	4	–	0	2	–	7	–	0
Winston-Salem State	1	–	5	–	0	3	–	5	–	0
North Carolina A&T	0	–	3	–	0	4	–	6	–	0
Championship: Virginia State 32, Johnson C. Smith 14
$ – Conference champion; x – Division champion/co-champions; y – Championship game participant; Rankings from NAIA Division I poll

The 1970 Delaware State Hornets football team represented Delaware State College—now known as Delaware State University—as a member of the Northern Division of the Central Intercollegiate Athletic Association (CIAA) in the 1970 NCAA College Division football season. Led by fourth-year head coach Arnold Jeter, the Hornets compiled an overall record of 6–2 and a mark of 4–1 in conference play, placing third in the CIAA's Northern Division. This was Delaware State’s final season competing in the CIAA, as they moved to the newly formed Mid-Eastern Athletic Conference (MEAC) in 1971. Following the season, running back Steve Davis was selected with the 60th pick in the 1971 NFL draft, becoming the first Hornet to be selected in an NFL Draft.

== Schedule ==
Date	Opponent	Site	Result	Attendance	Source
September 12	at Lock Haven*	Lock Haven, PA	W 19–14		
September 26	at Montclair State*	Sprague Field; Upper Montclair, NJ	L 7–10	5,828	
October 3	Hampton	Alumni Stadium; Dover, DE	W 49–0		
October 10	at Howard	Washington, DC	W 20–0		
October 17	Saint Paul's (VA)	Alumni Stadium; Dover, DE	W 6–0		
October 24	at Morgan State	Hughes Stadium; Baltimore, MD	L 6–34		
October 31	Millersville*	Alumni Stadium; Dover, DE	W 44–10		
November 14	at Maryland Eastern Shore	Princess Anne, MD	W 21–15		
*Non-conference game
