= 1970 NCAA College Division football season =

American college football season

- Champion(s): Arkansas State (AP, UPI); Tennessee State (black)

The 1970 NCAA College Division football season was the 15th season of college football in the United States organized by the National Collegiate Athletic Association at the NCAA College Division level.

== Conference and program changes ==
=== Conference changes ===
School	1969 Conference	1970 Conference
Cal State Fullerton	New Program	CCAA
Central Michigan	IIAC	Independent
Eastern Illinois	IIAC	Independent
Fordham	Reactivated Program	Independent
Georgetown	Reactivated Program	Independent
Illinois State	IIAC	Independent
Saint Mary's	Reactivated Program	Independent
Western Illinois	IIAC	Independent

== Conference standings ==
1970 Big Sky Conference football standings
	Conf.					Overall
Team	W		L		T	W		L		T
Montana $	5	–	0	–	0	10	–	1	–	0
Idaho State	3	–	2	–	0	5	–	5	–	0
Boise State	2	–	2	–	0	8	–	3	–	0
Weber State	3	–	3	–	0	5	–	5	–	1
Idaho	2	–	2	–	0	4	–	7	–	0
Montana State	1	–	5	–	0	2	–	8	–	0
Northern Arizona	0	–	4	–	0	2	–	8	–	0
$ – Conference champion; Boise State's game against Long Beach State and Northern Arizona's game against New Mexico State counted in the conference standings.

1970 California Collegiate Athletic Association football standings
	Conf.					Overall
Team	W		L		T	W		L		T
No. 20 Cal Poly $	3	–	0	–	0	8	–	2	–	0
Cal State Fullerton	3	–	1	–	0	6	–	4	–	1
Valley State	1	–	2	–	0	4	–	6	–	0
Cal Poly Pomona	1	–	3	–	0	5	–	5	–	0
UC Riverside	0	–	2	–	0	4	–	6	–	0
$ – Conference champion; Rankings from UPI small college poll

1970 Central Intercollegiate Athletic Association football standings
	Conf.					Overall
Team	W		L		T	W		L		T
Northern
Morgan State x	5	–	0	–	0	8	–	2	–	0
No. 16 Virginia State y$	5	–	1	–	0	8	–	2	–	0
Delaware State	4	–	1	–	0	6	–	2	–	0
Howard	3	–	2	–	0	7	–	2	–	0
Saint Paul's (VA)	1	–	1	–	0	3	–	5	–	0
Norfolk State	2	–	3	–	0	3	–	6	–	0
Virginia Union	1	–	4	–	0	3	–	6	–	0
Maryland Eastern Shore	1	–	5	–	0	1	–	8	–	0
Hampton	0	–	5	–	0	0	–	9	–	0
Southern
No. 17 Johnson C. Smith xy	6	–	0	–	0	8	–	2	–	0
Elizabeth City State	4	–	1	–	0	6	–	3	–	0
North Carolina Central	3	–	1	–	0	5	–	4	–	0
Shaw	3	–	2	–	1	3	–	5	–	1
Fayetteville State	1	–	3	–	1	3	–	5	–	1
Livingstone	1	–	4	–	0	2	–	7	–	0
Winston-Salem State	1	–	5	–	0	3	–	5	–	0
North Carolina A&T	0	–	3	–	0	4	–	6	–	0
Championship: Virginia State 32, Johnson C. Smith 14
$ – Conference champion; x – Division champion/co-champions; y – Championship game participant; Rankings from NAIA Division I poll

1970 College Athletic Conference football standings
	Conf.					Overall
Team	W		L		T	W		L		T
Southwestern (TN) +	3	–	1	–	0	7	–	1	–	0
Washington University +	3	–	1	–	0	5	–	4	–	0
Centre	2	–	2	–	0	4	–	5	–	0
Washington and Lee	1	–	3	–	0	2	–	7	–	0
Sewanee	1	–	3	–	0	2	–	6	–	0
+ – Conference co-champions

1970 College Conference of Illinois and Wisconsin football standings
	Conf.					Overall
Team	W		L		T	W		L		T
No. 9 Carthage $	7	–	0	–	1	7	–	1	–	1
Carroll (WI)	7	–	1	–	0	8	–	1	–	0
Illinois Wesleyan	5	–	2	–	1	5	–	3	–	1
Millikin	5	–	3	–	0	5	–	4	–	0
Elmhurst	4	–	4	–	0	4	–	5	–	0
Augustana (IL)	2	–	5	–	0	3	–	6	–	0
North Park	2	–	5	–	1	2	–	6	–	1
Wheaton (IL)	1	–	6	–	1	1	–	7	–	1
North Central (IL)	0	–	8	–	0	1	–	8	–	0
$ – Conference champion; Rankings from NAIA Division II poll

1970 Eastern Football Conference football standings
	Conf.					Overall
Team	W		L		T	W		L		T
Montclair State +	3	–	1	–	0	9	–	1	–	0
Southern Connecticut State +	3	–	1	–	0	5	–	3	–	1
Central Connecticut State	2	–	1	–	1	5	–	3	–	1
Bridgeport	1	–	3	–	0	4	–	6	–	0
Glassboro State	0	–	3	–	1	3	–	4	–	1
+ – Conference co-champions

1970 Far Western Conference football standings
	Conf.					Overall
Team	W		L		T	W		L		T
Chico State +	3	–	1	–	0	8	–	3	–	0
Cal State Hayward +	3	–	1	–	0	7	–	4	–	0
UC Davis	2	–	2	–	0	6	–	4	–	0
Humboldt State	2	–	2	–	0	5	–	5	–	0
San Francisco State	0	–	4	–	0	0	–	9	–	1
Sonoma State *	0	–	0	–	0	4	–	4	–	1
Sacramento State *	0	–	0	–	0	4	–	6	–	0
+ – Conference co-champions; * – ineligible for conference championship

1970 Gulf States Conference football standings
	Conf.					Overall
Team	W		L		T	W		L		T
Southwestern Louisiana $	5	–	0	–	0	9	–	2	–	0
Northwestern State	3	–	2	–	0	7	–	3	–	0
Northeast Louisiana	3	–	2	–	0	5	–	4	–	0
McNeese State	2	–	3	–	0	5	–	6	–	0
Southeastern Louisiana	2	–	3	–	0	4	–	6	–	0
Louisiana Tech	0	–	5	–	0	2	–	8	–	0
$ – Conference champion

1970 Independent College Athletic Conference football standings
	Conf.					Overall
Team	W		L		T	W		L		T
Alfred $	3	–	0	–	0	7	–	1	–	0
St. Lawrence	2	–	1	–	0	4	–	4	–	0
RPI	1	–	2	–	0	2	–	7	–	0
Hobart	0	–	3	–	0	0	–	8	–	0
$ – Conference champion

1970 Indiana Collegiate Conference football standings
	Conf.					Overall
Team	W		L		T	W		L		T
Evansville $	4	–	0	–	0	6	–	3	–	0
Saint Joseph's (IN)	3	–	1	–	0	7	–	2	–	0
Butler	2	–	2	–	0	3	–	6	–	1
Valparaiso	1	–	3	–	0	5	–	3	–	1
DePauw	0	–	4	–	0	4	–	5	–	0
$ – Conference champion

1970 Iowa Conference football standings
	Conf.					Overall
Team	W		L		T	W		L		T
Luther $	6	–	1	–	0	8	–	2	–	0
No. 17 Central (IA)	5	–	2	–	0	6	–	2	–	0
No. 18 Simpson (IA)	5	–	2	–	0	6	–	2	–	0
William Penn	5	–	2	–	0	6	–	3	–	0
Wartburg	3	–	4	–	0	3	–	6	–	0
Dubuque	2	–	5	–	0	2	–	7	–	0
Upper Iowa	1	–	6	–	0	1	–	6	–	1
Buena Vista	1	–	6	–	0	1	–	7	–	0
$ – Conference champion; Rankings from NAIA Division II poll

1970 Little Three Conference football standings
	Conf.					Overall
Team	W		L		T	W		L		T
Wesleyan $	2	–	0	–	0	5	–	3	–	0
Amherst	1	–	1	–	0	3	–	5	–	0
Williams	0	–	2	–	0	3	–	5	–	0
$ – Conference champion

1970 Maine Intercollegiate Athletic Association football standings
	Conf.					Overall
Team	W		L		T	W		L		T
Bowdoin $	2	–	0	–	0	6	–	1	–	0
Colby	1	–	1	–	0	3	–	5	–	0
Bates	0	–	2	–	0	0	–	8	–	0
$ – Conference champion

1970 Mason–Dixon Conference football standings
	Conf.					Overall
Team	W		L		T	W		L		T
Hampden–Sydney $	4	–	0	–	0	9	–	2	–	0
Randolph–Macon	3	–	1	–	0	7	–	2	–	0
Towson State	2	–	1	–	0	6	–	2	–	0
Bridgewater	2	–	2	–	0	4	–	5	–	0
Western Maryland	1	–	3	–	0	4	–	5	–	0
Gallaudet	0	–	2	–	0	3	–	4	–	0
Johns Hopkins	0	–	3	–	0	5	–	4	–	0
$ – Conference champion

1970 Michigan Intercollegiate Athletic Association football standings
	Conf.					Overall
Team	W		L		T	W		L		T
Adrian +	4	–	1	–	0	6	–	3	–	0
Alma +	4	–	1	–	0	5	–	3	–	0
Hope	3	–	2	–	0	5	–	4	–	0
Albion	3	–	2	–	0	3	–	6	–	0
Kalamazoo	1	–	4	–	0	3	–	5	–	0
Olivet	0	–	5	–	0	0	–	9	–	0
+ – Conference co-champions

1970 Mid-South Athletic Conference football standings
	Conf.					Overall
Team	W		L		T	W		L		T
No. 2 Jacksonville State $	5	–	0	–	0	10	–	0	–	0
Tennessee–Martin	4	–	1	–	0	7	–	3	–	0
Troy State	3	–	2	–	0	6	–	4	–	1
Delta State	2	–	3	–	0	3	–	6	–	1
Florence State	1	–	4	–	0	5	–	5	–	0
Livingston	0	–	5	–	0	4	–	5	–	0
$ – Conference champion; Rankings from NAIA Division I poll

1970 Middle Atlantic Conference football standings
	Conf.					Overall
Team	W		L		T	W		L		T
Northern Division
Susquehanna x	5	–	1	–	0	7	–	3	–	0
Albright	4	–	2	–	0	4	–	5	–	0
Upsala	3	–	3	–	1	3	–	4	–	1
Lycoming	3	–	4	–	0	3	–	5	–	0
Delaware Valley	1	–	4	–	0	1	–	7	–	0
Juniata	1	–	6	–	0	2	–	6	–	1
Wagner *	3	–	1	–	0	5	–	3	–	1
Wilkes *	0	–	2	–	1	3	–	4	–	1
Southern Division
Moravian x	6	–	1	–	2	6	–	1	–	2
Muhlenberg	7	–	2	–	0	7	–	2	–	0
Johns Hopkins	5	–	2	–	0	5	–	4	–	0
Lebanon Valley	5	–	2	–	1	5	–	3	–	1
Western Maryland	3	–	2	–	0	4	–	5	–	0
Pennsylvania Military	4	–	3	–	0	5	–	4	–	0
Franklin & Marshall	3	–	4	–	0	3	–	5	–	0
Ursinus	3	–	4	–	0	3	–	5	–	0
Dickinson	2	–	4	–	1	2	–	4	–	1
Swarthmore	2	–	6	–	0	2	–	6	–	0
Haverford	0	–	7	–	0	0	–	7	–	0
x – Division champion/co-champions; * – Ineligible due to insufficient conference games; Rankings from AP Poll

1970 Midwest Conference football standings
	Conf.					Overall
Team	W		L		T	W		L		T
No. 18 St. Olaf $	8	–	0	–	0	9	–	0	–	0
Monmouth (IL)	7	–	1	–	0	8	–	1	–	0
Knox	5	–	3	–	0	6	–	3	–	0
Ripon	5	–	3	–	0	6	–	3	–	0
Grinnell	4	–	4	–	0	5	–	4	–	0
Cornell (IA)	3	–	5	–	0	4	–	5	–	0
Coe	2	–	6	–	0	3	–	6	–	0
Lawrence	2	–	6	–	0	3	–	6	–	0
Carleton	0	–	8	–	0	1	–	8	–	0
Beloit			–			0	–	9	–	0
$ – Conference champion; Beloit was allowed to compete with freshmen. Games with Beloit were not counted in the conference standings.; Rankings from AP small college poll

1970 Minnesota Intercollegiate Athletic Conference football standings
	Conf.					Overall
Team	W		L		T	W		L		T
Concordia–Moorhead $	6	–	1	–	0	7	–	2	–	1
No. 14 Gustavus Adolphus	5	–	2	–	0	8	–	2	–	0
Saint John's (MN)	5	–	2	–	0	6	–	3	–	0
Minnesota–Duluth	4	–	2	–	1	7	–	2	–	1
Hamline	3	–	4	–	0	6	–	4	–	0
Macalester	2	–	4	–	1	3	–	5	–	1
Augsburg	1	–	6	–	0	1	–	8	–	0
St. Thomas (MN)	1	–	6	–	0	1	–	9	–	0
$ – Conference champion; Rankings from NAIA Division I poll

1970 Missouri Intercollegiate Athletic Association football standings
	Conf.					Overall
Team	W		L		T	W		L		T
Central Missouri State +	5	–	1	–	0	9	–	1	–	0
NE Missouri State +	5	–	1	–	0	7	–	2	–	0
SE Missouri State	4	–	2	–	0	5	–	5	–	0
Lincoln (MO)	3	–	3	–	0	7	–	3	–	0
Missouri–Rolla	2	–	3	–	1	6	–	3	–	1
SW Missouri State	1	–	4	–	1	2	–	7	–	1
NW Missouri State	0	–	6	–	0	2	–	8	–	0
+ – Conference co-champions

1970 New Jersey State Athletic Conference football standings
	Conf.					Overall
Team	W		L		T	W		L		T
Montclair State $	3	–	0	–	0	9	–	1	–	0
Glassboro State	2	–	1	–	0	3	–	4	–	1
Jersey City State	1	–	2	–	0	5	–	3	–	0
Trenton State	0	–	3	–	0	2	–	6	–	0
$ – Conference champion

1970 North Central Conference football standings
	Conf.					Overall
Team	W		L		T	W		L		T
No. 3 North Dakota State $	6	–	0	–	0	9	–	0	–	1
North Dakota	4	–	1	–	1	5	–	3	–	1
South Dakota	3	–	2	–	1	4	–	4	–	2
Augustana (SD)	3	–	3	–	0	4	–	6	–	0
Morningside	2	–	4	–	0	3	–	5	–	0
Northern Iowa	1	–	5	–	0	2	–	8	–	0
South Dakota State	1	–	5	–	0	2	–	8	–	0
$ – Conference champion; Rankings from AP small college poll

1970 Northern Intercollegiate Conference football standings
	Conf.					Overall
Team	W		L		T	W		L		T
Michigan Tech +	5	–	1	–	0	8	–	1	–	0
Minnesota Morris +	5	–	1	–	0	7	–	2	–	0
St. Cloud State +	5	–	1	–	0	6	–	3	–	0
Moorhead State	3	–	3	–	0	4	–	4	–	1
Winona State	1	–	5	–	0	2	–	7	–	0
Bemidji State	1	–	5	–	0	1	–	8	–	0
Southwest State (MN)	1	–	5	–	0	1	–	8	–	0
+ – Conference co-champions

1970 Ohio Athletic Conference football standings
	Conf.					Overall
Team	W		L		T	W		L		T
Capital +	6	–	0	–	0	8	–	1	–	0
No. 17 Wittenberg +	5	–	0	–	0	9	–	0	–	0
Wooster	5	–	1	–	0	7	–	2	–	0
Muskingum	5	–	1	–	0	7	–	2	–	0
Mount Union	4	–	1	–	0	8	–	1	–	0
Denison	3	–	4	–	0	5	–	4	–	0
Marietta	3	–	4	–	0	4	–	5	–	0
Baldwin–Wallace	2	–	3	–	0	6	–	3	–	0
Kenyon	2	–	4	–	0	5	–	4	–	0
Heidelberg	2	–	5	–	0	3	–	6	–	0
Hiram	2	–	5	–	0	2	–	6	–	0
Otterbein	2	–	5	–	0	2	–	7	–	0
Ohio Wesleyan	1	–	5	–	0	2	–	7	–	0
Oberlin	0	–	5	–	0	2	–	6	–	0
+ – Conference co-champions; Rankings from AP small college poll

1970 Ohio Valley Conference football standings
	Conf.					Overall
Team	W		L		T	W		L		T
No. 12/9 Western Kentucky $	5	–	1	–	1	8	–	1	–	1
Eastern Kentucky	5	–	2	–	0	8	–	2	–	0
East Tennessee State	4	–	1	–	2	7	–	1	–	2
Morehead State	4	–	3	–	0	6	–	4	–	0
Middle Tennessee	3	–	3	–	1	6	–	3	–	1
Austin Peay	2	–	5	–	0	3	–	7	–	0
Tennessee Tech	2	–	5	–	0	4	–	6	–	0
Murray State	1	–	6	–	0	4	–	6	–	0
$ – Conference champion; Rankings from AP/UPI small college polls

1970 Pennsylvania State Athletic Conference football standings
	Conf.					Overall
Team	W		L		T	W		L		T
East Division
West Chester xy	5	–	0	–	0	7	–	4	–	0
East Stroudsburg	4	–	2	–	0	5	–	4	–	0
Kutztown	4	–	2	–	0	5	–	3	–	0
Bloomsburg	3	–	3	–	0	5	–	3	–	0
Millersville	3	–	3	–	0	4	–	5	–	0
Mansfield	1	–	5	–	0	2	–	7	–	0
Cheyney	0	–	5	–	0	0	–	9	–	0
West Division
No. 3 Edinboro xy$^	5	–	0	–	0	9	–	1	–	0
Clarion	3	–	2	–	0	5	–	3	–	0
California (PA)	3	–	2	–	0	5	–	4	–	0
Slippery Rock	2	–	3	–	0	4	–	5	–	0
Shippensburg	2	–	3	–	0	3	–	5	–	0
Lock Haven	0	–	5	–	0	1	–	7	–	0
Championship: Edinboro 14, West Chester 34
$ – Conference champion; x – Division champion/co-champions; y – Championship game participant; ^ – NAIA Division II playoff participantpoll=NAIA Division II poll; Rankings from AP Poll

1970 Presidents' Athletic Conference football standings
	Conf.					Overall
Team	W		L		T	W		L		T
Washington & Jefferson $	5	–	0	–	0	0	–	7	–	1
Bethany (WV)	3	–	2	–	0	6	–	2	–	0
John Carroll	2	–	2	–	1	2	–	5	–	1
Allegheny	2	–	3	–	0	2	–	5	–	0
Case Western Reserve	1	–	3	–	1	2	–	5	–	1
Thiel	1	–	4	–	0	2	–	6	–	0
$ – Conference champion

1970 Southern California Intercollegiate Athletic Conference football standings
	Conf.					Overall
Team	W		L		T	W		L		T
Claremont-Mudd +	3	–	1	–	0	8	–	1	–	0
Redlands +	3	–	1	–	0	6	–	4	–	0
Pomona	2	–	2	–	0	6	–	3	–	0
Whittier	2	–	2	–	0	4	–	6	–	0
Occidental	0	–	4	–	0	2	–	7	–	0
+ – Conference co-champions

1970 Southern Intercollegiate Athletic Conference football standings
	Conf.					Overall
Team	W		L		T	W		L		T
Division I
No. 4 Tuskegee x	4	–	1	–	0	9	–	1	–	0
Florida A&M x	4	–	1	–	0	5	–	5	–	0
Alabama State	3	–	2	–	0	6	–	4	–	0
Morris Brown	3	–	2	–	0	4	–	5	–	0
Alabama A&M	2	–	3	–	0	4	–	5	–	0
Albany State	2	–	3	–	0	4	–	6	–	0
Bethune–Cookman	1	–	4	–	0	5	–	4	–	0
South Carolina State	1	–	4	–	0	3	–	6	–	0
Division II
Fort Valley State x	4	–	1	–	0	7	–	2	–	0
Fisk x	4	–	1	–	0	5	–	2	–	0
Savannah State	3	–	2	–	0	3	–	5	–	0
Lane	3	–	2	–	0	3	–	7	–	0
Morehouse	1	–	4	–	0	3	–	6	–	0
Clark (GA)	1	–	4	–	0	2	–	6	–	0
Knoxville	1	–	4	–	0	1	–	6	–	0
x – Division champion/co-champions; Rankings from NAIA Division II poll

1970 Southland Conference football standings
	Conf.					Overall
Team	W		L		T	W		L		T
No. 1 Arkansas State $	4	–	0	–	0	11	–	0	–	0
No. 14 Abilene Christian	3	–	1	–	0	9	–	2	–	0
Trinity (TX)	2	–	2	–	0	5	–	6	–	0
Lamar Tech	1	–	3	–	0	3	–	7	–	0
UT Arlington	0	–	4	–	0	0	–	10	–	0
$ – Conference champion; Rankings from AP small college poll

1970 Southwestern Athletic Conference football standings
	Conf.					Overall
Team	W		L		T	W		L		T
No. 7/9 Alcorn A&M $	6	–	0	–	0	8	–	1	–	0
No. 13/16 Grambling	5	–	1	–	0	9	–	2	–	0
Texas Southern	4	–	2	–	0	6	–	3	–	0
Southern	2	–	3	–	1	5	–	5	–	1
Prairie View A&M	2	–	3	–	1	4	–	5	–	1
Jackson State	1	–	5	–	0	4	–	7	–	0
Mississippi Valley State	0	–	6	–	0	1	–	8	–	0
$ – Conference champion; Rankings from NAIA Division I poll and AP small college poll

1970 Wisconsin State University Conference football standings
	Conf.					Overall
Team	W		L		T	W		L		T
No. 3 Platteville State $^	8	–	0	–	0	10	–	1	–	0
Eau Claire State	5	–	3	–	0	6	–	4	–	0
Whitewater State	5	–	3	–	0	6	–	4	–	0
Oshkosh State	5	–	3	–	0	5	–	5	–	0
Superior State	5	–	3	–	0	5	–	5	–	0
La Crosse State	4	–	3	–	1	5	–	4	–	1
Stout State	2	–	6	–	0	3	–	7	–	0
Stevens Point State	1	–	6	–	1	1	–	8	–	1
River Falls State	0	–	8	–	0	1	–	8	–	0
$ – Conference champion; ^ – NAIA Division I playoff participant; Rankings from NAIA Division I poll

1970 Yankee Conference football standings
	Conf.					Overall
Team	W		L		T	W		L		T
Connecticut $	4	–	0	–	1	4	–	4	–	2
UMass	3	–	1	–	1	4	–	5	–	1
New Hampshire	3	–	2	–	0	5	–	3	–	0
Rhode Island	3	–	2	–	0	3	–	5	–	0
Maine	1	–	4	–	0	3	–	5	–	0
Vermont	0	–	5	–	0	0	–	9	–	0
$ – Conference champion

1970 NCAA College Division independents football records
	Conf.			Overall
Team	W	L	T	W		L		T
No. 4 Tampa		–		10	–	1	–	0
No. 5 Tennessee State		–		10	–	0	–	0
No. 11 Delaware		–		9	–	2	–	0
Hawaii		–		9	–	2	–	0
Northern Michigan		–		8	–	2	–	0
No. 19 Eastern Michigan		–		7	–	2	–	1
Mankato State		–		7	–	2	–	1
Akron		–		7	–	3	–	0
Central Michigan		–		7	–	3	–	0
Temple		–		7	–	3	–	0
Drake		–		7	–	4	–	0
Wayne State (MI)		–		6	–	2	–	0
Arkansas AM&N		–		6	–	3	–	0
Southern Illinois		–		6	–	3	–	0
St. Norbert		–		6	–	3	–	0
Nevada		–		6	–	3	–	1
Portland State		–		6	–	4	–	0
UNLV		–		6	–	4	–	0
Boston University		–		5	–	4	–	0
Cortland		–		5	–	4	–	0
Indiana (PA)		–		5	–	4	–	0
Santa Clara		–		5	–	4	–	1
Lafayette		–		6	–	5	–	0
Colorado College		–		4	–	4	–	0
Drexel		–		4	–	4	–	0
Hofstra		–		5	–	5	–	0
Indiana State		–		5	–	5	–	0
Samford		–		5	–	5	–	0
Wabash		–		3	–	3	–	2
Saint Mary's		–		3	–	4	–	0
Ashland		–		4	–	6	–	0
Bucknell		–		4	–	6	–	0
Lehigh		–		4	–	6	–	0
Rose Poly		–		3	–	5	–	1
Northeastern		–		3	–	5	–	0
Indiana Central		–		3	–	6	–	0
Lake Forest		–		3	–	6	–	0
Kentucky State		–		3	–	6	–	0
Chicago		–		2	–	5	–	0
Chattanooga		–		3	–	8	–	0
Parsons		–		2	–	7	–	0
Eastern Illinois		–		2	–	8	–	0
Milwaukee		–		1	–	9	–	0
Rankings from AP small college poll

== Rankings ==
College Division teams (also referred to as "small college") were ranked in polls by the AP (a panel of writers) and by UPI (coaches). The national champion(s) for each season were determined by the final poll rankings, published at or near the end of the regular season, before any bowl games were played.

=== Small college final polls ===
In 1970, both UPI and AP ranked Arkansas State (10–0) number one. The 34 coaches on the UPI board ranked Tampa second, followed by Montana, while the AP panel ranked Montana second, followed by North Dakota State. Arkansas State went on to beat Central Missouri State in the Pecan Bowl, 38–21, while Montana lost to North Dakota State in the Camellia Bowl, 31–16.

United Press International (coaches) final poll
Published on December 2

Rank	School	Record	No. 1 votes	Total points
1	Arkansas State	10–0	21	318
2	Tampa	10–1	8	279
3	Montana	10–0	3	272
4	North Dakota State	8–0–1		201
5	Tennessee State	10–0	1	173
6	Long Beach State	9–2		140
7	Wofford	10–0	1	125
8	Delaware	8–2		89
9	Western Kentucky	8–1–1		55
10	Hawaii	9–1		46

Associated Press (writers) final poll
Published on December 3

Rank	School	Record	No. 1 votes	Total points
1	Arkansas State	10–0	4	201
2	Montana	10–0	3	162
3	North Dakota State	8–0–1		147
4	Tampa	10–1	2	146
5	Tennessee State	10–0		131
6	Wofford	11–0†	2	109
7	Texas A&I	10–1	1	99
8	Jacksonville State	9–0		87
9	Alcorn A&M	9–1		87
10	Southwestern Louisiana	9–2		73

†Includes NAIA playoff win

== Bowl games ==
The postseason consisted of four bowl games as regional finals, all played on December 12.

Bowl	Region	Location	Winning team		Losing team		Ref
Boardwalk	East	Atlantic City, New Jersey	Delaware	38	Morgan State	23	
Grantland Rice	Mideast	Baton Rouge, Louisiana	Tennessee State	26	Southwestern Louisiana	25	
Pecan	Midwest	Arlington, Texas	Arkansas State	38	Central Missouri State	21	
Camellia	West	Sacramento, California	North Dakota State	31	Montana	16	

This was the final year for the Pecan Bowl; it was succeeded by the Pioneer Bowl in Wichita Falls in 1971.

== See also ==
- 1970 NCAA University Division football season
- 1970 NAIA Division I football season
- 1970 NAIA Division II football season
