= 1970 small college football rankings =

- Selectors: AP, UPI
- No. 1: Arkansas State
- Small college football rankings (AP, UPI)
- «1969 1971»

The 1970 small college football rankings are rankings of college football teams representing smaller college and university teams during the 1970 college football season, including the 1970 NCAA College Division football season and the 1970 NAIA football season. Separate rankings were published by the Associated Press (AP) and the United Press International (UPI). The AP rankings were selected by a board of sports writers, and the UPI rankings were selected by a board of small-college coaches.

The 1970 Arkansas State Indians football team compiled a perfect 11–0 record and was rated No. 1 by both the AP and UPI. Montana (10–1) was ranked No. 2 by the AP, and Tampa (10–1) was ranked No. 2 by the UPI.

== Legend ==
	Increase in ranking
	Decrease in ranking
	Not ranked previous week
(#–#)	Win–loss record
(Italics)	Number of first place votes
т	Tied with team above or below also with this symbol

== AP poll ==
	Week 1 Sept 24	Week 2 Oct 1	Week 3 Oct 8	Week 4 Oct 15	Week 5 Oct 22	Week 6 Oct 29	Week 7 Nov 5	Week 8 Nov 12	Week 9 Nov 19	Week 10 Nov 26	Week 11 Dec 3	
1.	Arkansas State (1–0) (4)	Arkansas State (2–0) (5)	Arkansas State (3–0) (7)	Arkansas State (4–0) (5)	Arkansas State (5–0) (4)	Arkansas State (6–0) (4)	Arkansas State (7–0) (5)	Arkansas State (8–0) (5)	Arkansas State (9–0) (7)	Arkansas State (10–0) (7)	Arkansas State (10–0) (4)	1.
2.	Montana (2–0) (3)	Akron (3–0) (2)	Montana (4–0) (6)	Montana (5–0) (6)	Montana (6–0) (2)	Montana (7–0) (4)	Montana (8–0) (2)	Montana (9–0) (3)	Montana (10–0) (4)	Montana (10–0) (3)	Montana (10–0) (3)	2.
3.	Akron (2–0) (2)	Montana (3–0) (4)	Akron (4–0) (4)	North Dakota State (4–0–1)	Tampa (5–0) (3)	Tampa (6–0) (3)	North Dakota State (7–0–1)	Tampa (8–0) (4)	North Dakota State (8–0–1)	North Dakota State (8–0–1)	North Dakota State (8–0–1)	3.
4.	North Dakota State (1–0–1) (1)	Delaware (3–0)	North Dakota State (3–0–1)	Texas A&I (4–1) (2)	Texas A&I (5–0)	North Dakota State (6–0–1)	Tampa (7–0) (1)	North Dakota State (8–0–1)	Tampa (9–0) (1)	Tennessee State (9–0)	Tampa (10–0) (2)	4.
5.	Delaware (2–0)	North Dakota State (2–0–1)	Texas A&I (3–1)	Tampa (4–0) (1)	Tennessee State (5–0)	Tennessee State (6–0)	Western Kentucky (7–0–1) (1)	Tennessee State (8–0)	Tennessee State (8–0)	Tampa (9–1) (1)	Tennessee State (10–0)	5.
6.	Texas A&I (1–0) (1)	Eastern Michigan (2–0–1) (1)	Tennessee State (4–0) (1)	Tennessee State (5–0)	North Dakota State (5–0–1)	Western Kentucky (6–0–1) (1)	Tennessee State (7–0)	Wofford (9–0) (1)	Wofford (10–0) (1)	Wofford (10–0) (2)	Wofford (11–0) (2)	6.
7.	Eastern Michigan (1–0–1)	Texas A&I (2–1) (1)	Eastern Michigan (3–0–1)	Delaware (4–1) (1)	Delaware (5–1) (2)	Delaware (5–1)	Southwestern Louisiana (7–1)	Texas A&I (7–1) (1)	Texas A&I (8–1) (1)	Texas A&I (9–1) (1)	Texas A&I (10–1) (1)	7.
8.	Louisiana Tech (1–0)	Drake (3–0)	Tampa (3–0)	Western Kentucky (4–0–1) (1)	Western Kentucky (5–0–1)	Southern Illinois (5–0)	Delaware (6–1) (1)	Wittenberg (8–0)	Eastern Kentucky (8–1) (1)	Jacksonville State (8–1)	Jacksonville State (9–0)	8.
9.	Drake (2–0)	Tampa (2–0)	Southern Illinois (3–0)	Southern Illinois (3–0)	Southern Illinois (4–0)	Southwestern Louisiana (6–1)	Wofford (8–0)	Abilene Christian (7–2)	Abilene Christian (8–2)	Alcorn A&M (8–1)	Alcorn A&M (9–1)	9.
10.	Tennessee State (2–0)	Tennessee State (3–0)	Western Kentucky (3–0–1)	Akron (4–1)	Wofford (6–0) (2)	Wofford (7–0) (2)	Southern Illinois (6–0) (1)	Eastern Kentucky (7–1) (1)	Wittenberg (9–0)	Southwestern Louisiana (9–2)	Southwestern Louisiana (9–2)	10.
11.	Northern Arizona (2–0)	Western Kentucky (2–0)	Delaware (3–1)	Abilene Christian (4–1)	Wittenberg (5–0)	Texas A&I (5–1) (1)	Wittenberg (7–0)	Southern Illinois (6–1)	St. Olaf (9–0)	Delaware (8–2)	Delaware (8–2)	11.
12.	Western Kentucky (1–0) т	Pacific Lutheran (2–0) (1)	Boise State (4–0)	Wofford (4–1)	Abilene Christian (5–1)	Alcorn A&M (5–1)	Texas A&I (6–1)	Western Kentucky (7–1–1)	Southwestern Louisiana (8–2)	Western Kentucky (9–1–1)	Western Kentucky (9–1–1)	12.
13.	Southern Illinois (1–0) т	Wittenberg (2–0)	Drake (3–1)	Central Missouri State (5–0) т	Southwestern Louisiana (5–1)	Linfield (6–0) (1)	Alcorn A&M (6–1)	St. Olaf (8–0)	Western Kentucky (8–1–1)	Wittenberg (9–0)	Long Beach State (9–2)	13.
14.	East Tennessee State (1–0)	Northern Colorado (2–0)	Wofford (3–1)	Southwestern Louisiana (4–1) т	Eastern Kentucky (5–0)	Wittenberg (6–0)	Eastern Kentucky (6–1)	Linfield (8–0) (1)	Eastern Michigan (7–2–1)	Long Beach State (9–1)	Abilene Christian (8–2)	14.
15.	Pacific Lutheran (1–0)	Southern Illinois (2–0)	Wittenberg (3–0)	Troy State (4–0–1)	Central Missouri State (6–0)	Boise State (6–1)	Linfield (7–0) (1)	Alcorn A&M (7–1)	Jacksonville State (7–0)	Abilene Christian (8–2)	Westminster (PA) (9–0)	15.
16.	Tampa (1–0) т	Central Missouri State (3–0)	Central Missouri State (4–0)	Alcorn A&M (4–1) т	Springfield (MA) (5–1)	Abilene Christian (5–2)	Abilene Christian (6–2)	Jacksonville State (6–0)	Delaware (7–2)	St. Olaf (9–0)	Grambling (9–2)	16.
17.	Northern Michigan (2–0) (1) т	Lamar Tech (2–0) (1)	Troy State (3–0)	Wittenberg (4–0) т	Boise State (5–1)	St. Olaf (6–0)	St. Olaf (7–0)	Southwestern Louisiana (7–2)	Westminster (PA) (8–0)	Westminster (PA) (8–0)	Wittenberg (9–0)	17.
18.	UMass (1–0) т (Note: In the actual printed polls, UMass was listed as Massachusetts)	Humboldt State (3–0)	Grambling (3–0)	Eastern Michigan (3–1–1)	Linfield (4–0)	Springfield (MA) (6–0) т	Jacksonville State (8–0)	Delaware (6–2)	Grambling (7–2)	Grambling (8–2)	St. Olaf (9–0)	18.
19.	Howard Payne (1–0) т	Howard Payne (2–0)	Howard Payne (3–0)	St. Olaf (4–1)	Alcorn A&M (4–1)	Eastern Kentucky (5–1) т	Boise State (7–1) т	Grambling (6–2)	Alcorn A&M (8–1)	Eastern Michigan (7–2–1)	Eastern Michigan (7–2–1)	19.
20.	Wittenberg (1–0)	Boise State (2–0)	Abilene Christian (3–1)	Northern Michigan (4–1)	Grambling (3–2)	Grambling (4–2) т	Grambling (5–2) т	Westminster (PA) (6–1)	Edinboro (9–0)	Edinboro (9–0)	Appalachian State (8–2) т	20.
21.											Montclair State (9–1–1) т	21.
22.											Sam Houston State (8–2–1) т	22.
	Week 1 Sept 24	Week 2 Oct 1	Week 3 Oct 8	Week 4 Oct 15	Week 5 Oct 22	Week 6 Oct 29	Week 7 Nov 5	Week 8 Nov 12	Week 9 Nov 19	Week 10 Nov 26	Week 11 Dec 3	
		Dropped: 8 Louisiana Tech; 11 Northern Arizona; 14 East Tennessee State; 17 Northern Michigan; 18 UMass	Dropped: 12 Pacific Lutheran; 14 Northern Colorado; 17 Lamar Tech; 18 Humboldt State	Dropped: 12 Boise State; 13 Drake; 18 Grambling; 19 Howard Payne	Dropped: 10 Akron; 15 Troy State; 18 Eastern Michigan; 19 St. Olaf; 20 Northern Michigan	Dropped: 15 Central Missouri State	Dropped: 18 Springfield (MA)	Dropped: 19 Boise State	Dropped: 11 Southern Illinois; 14 Linfield	Dropped: 8 Eastern Kentucky	Dropped: 20 Edinboro	

== UPI coaches poll ==
	Week 1 Sept 23 (Note: The UPI poll did not include won/loss records for the first three weeks. The won/loss records shown here have been copied from the AP poll where available.)	Week 2 Sept 30	Week 3 Oct 7	Week 4 Oct 14	Week 5 Oct 21	Week 6 Oct 28	Week 7 Nov 4 (Note: The UPI poll was missing a few won/loss records from week 7 onward. They have been filled in based on other research. This includes week 7: Southwest Louisiana & Northern Colorado; week 8: Alcorn A&M, Florida A&M & Wittenberg; week 9: Eastern Michigan; week 10: Northern Colorado; week 11: Central Missouri State, North Dakota & Northern Michigan.)	Week 8 Nov 11	Week 9 Nov 18	Week 10 Nov 25	Week 11 Dec 2	
1.	Arkansas State (1–0) (2)	Arkansas State (2–0) (16)	Arkansas State (3–0) (25)	Arkansas State (4–0) (24)	Tampa (5–0) (11)	Tampa (6–0) (18)	Tampa (7–0) (19)	Tampa (8–0) (17)	Tampa (9–0) (25)	Arkansas State (10–0) (17)	Arkansas State (10–0) (21)	1.
2.	Akron (2–0) (2) т	Delaware (3–0) (3)	Akron (4–0) (1)	Montana (5–0) (2)	Arkansas State (5–0) (15)	Arkansas State (6–0) (9)	Arkansas State (7–0) (9)	Arkansas State (8–0) (9)	Arkansas State (9–0) (4)	Tampa (9–1) (5)	Tampa (10–1) (8)	2.
3.	North Dakota State (1–0–1) (2) т	Akron (3–0) (1)	Montana (4–0) (2)	Tampa (4–0) (2)	Montana (6–0) (1)	Montana (7–0) (1)	Montana (8–0)	Montana (9–0) (2)	Montana (10–0) (3)	Montana (10–0) (6)	Montana (10–0) (3)	3.
4.	Delaware (2–0) (1)	Texas A&I (2–1) (2)	North Dakota State (3–0–1)	Texas A&I (4–1) (2)	Texas A&I (5–0) (2)	North Dakota State (6–0–1) (1)	North Dakota State (7–0–1) (1)	North Dakota State (8–0–1) (1)	North Dakota State (8–0–1)	North Dakota State (8–0–1)	North Dakota State (8–0–1)	4.
5.	Montana (2–0) (4)	Montana (3–0) (3)	Texas A&I (3–1) (1)	North Dakota State (4–0–1)	North Dakota State (5–0–1) (1)	Delaware (5–1)	Delaware (6–1) (1)	Tennessee State (8–0) (1)	Tennessee State (8–0) (1)	Tennessee State (9–0) (1)	Tennessee State (10–0) (1)	5.
6.	Texas A&I (1–0) (1)	North Dakota State (2–0–1)	Tampa (3–0) (1)	Tennessee State (5–0) (1)	Delaware (5–1)	Tennessee State (6–0) (1)	Tennessee State (7–0) (1)	Wofford (8–0) (1)	Wofford (10–0) (1)	Wofford (10–0) (1)	Long Beach State (9–2)	6.
7.	Tampa (1–0) т	Tampa (2–0) (2)	Delaware (3–1)	Delaware (4–1)	Tennessee State (5–0)	Western Kentucky (5–0–1)	Western Kentucky (6–0–1)	Western Kentucky (6–1–1)	Western Kentucky (7–1–1)	Long Beach State (8–2)	Wofford (10–0) (1)	7.
8.	Northern Michigan (2–0) т	Eastern Michigan (2–0–1)	Eastern Michigan (3–0–1)	Troy State (4–0–1)	Abilene Christian (5–1)	Wofford (7–0) (1)	Wofford (8–0) (1)	Abilene Christian (6–2)	Delaware (7–2)	Delaware (8–2)	Delaware (8–2)	8.
9.	Eastern Michigan (1–0–1)	Drake (3–0)	Tennessee State (4–0) (1)	Abilene Christian (4–1)	Western Kentucky (4–0–1)	Fresno State (6–1)	Southern Illinois (6–0)	Delaware (6–2)	Abilene Christian (8–2)	Western Kentucky (8–1–1)	Western Kentucky (8–1–1)	9.
10.	Drake (2–0)	Northern Colorado (2–0) (8)	Grambling (2–1)	Cal Poly (4–0) (1)	Eastern Kentucky (5–0)	Abilene Christian (5–2)	Abilene Christian (5–2)	Long Beach State (6–2)	Long Beach State (7–2)	Abilene Christian (8–2)	Hawaii (9–1)	10.
11.	Louisiana Tech (1–0)	Tennessee State (3–0) (1)	Troy State (3–0–1)	Akron (4–1)	Wofford (6–1)	Texas A&I (5–1)	Texas A&I (6–1)	Eastern Kentucky (7–1)	Eastern Kentucky (8–1)	Texas A&I (9–1)	Abilene Christian (8–2) т	11.
12.	Tennessee State (2–0)	Grambling	Cal Poly	Western Kentucky (4–0–1)	Fresno State (5–1)	Northern Michigan (6–1)	Eastern Kentucky (6–1)	Texas A&I (7–1)	Texas A&I (8–1)	Alcorn A&M (7–1)	Jacksonville State (9–0) т	12.
13.	New Mexico Highlands (1)	Northern Michigan	Northern Colorado	Wofford (4–1)	Grambling (3–2)	Southern Illinois (5–0)	Jacksonville State (5–0)	Southern Illinois (6–1)	Alcorn A&M (7–1)	Jacksonville State (8–0)	Texas A&I (9–1)	13.
14.	Wittenberg (1–0) т	North Dakota (1)	Abilene Christian (3–1)	North Dakota (2–1–1)	Northern Michigan (5–1)	Grambling (4–2)	Northeastern Oklahoma (5–0–1) (1)	Jacksonville State (6–0)	Grambling (7–2)	Grambling (8–2)	Alcorn A&M (8–1)	14.
15.	Grambling (1) т	Louisiana Tech	Northern Michigan	Grambling (2–2)	Missouri–Rolla (5–0)	Eastern Kentucky (5–1)	Southwestern Louisiana (7–1)	Grambling (6–2)	Jacksonville State (7–0)	Hawaii (8–1)	Grambling (9–2)	15.
16.	Wofford	Wofford (1)	Wofford (4–0) (1)	Florida A&M (3–0) т	Southern Illinois (4–0)	Northeastern Oklahoma (4–0–1) (1)	Linfield (7–0)	Alcorn A&M (7–1)	Hawaii (7–1)	Eastern Kentucky (8–2)	Central Missouri State (9–2) т	16.
17.	Western Carolina	Weber State (1)	Drake (3–1)	Northern Colorado (3–1) т	Northeastern Oklahoma (3–0–1) (1)	Jacksonville State (4–0)	Gustavus Adolphus (7–1)	Northeastern Oklahoma (6–0–1) (1)	Platteville State (10–0)	Platteville State (10–0)	Northeastern Oklahoma (8–1–1) т	17.
18.	Northern Colorado т	Cal Poly т	Boise State (4–0)	Northern Michigan (4–1)	Troy State (4–1–1)	Missouri–Rolla (5–0–1) т	Northern Colorado (5–2) т	Linfield (8–0)	Eastern Michigan (7–2–1)	Luther (8–1)	North Dakota (9–0–1)	18.
19.	Fresno State т	Lamar Tech (2–0) т	Howard Payne (3–0) т	Southern Illinois (3–0)	Cal Poly (4–1) т	Cal Poly (5–1) т	Grambling (5–2) т	Florida A&M (5–2) т	Central Oklahoma (8–1) т	Northeastern Oklahoma (8–1–1)	Westminster (PA) (9–1)	19.
20.	East Tennessee State (1–0)	Troy State т	Missouri–Rolla т	Missouri–Rolla (4–0)	Linfield (5–0) т	Linfield (6–0) т	Fresno State (6–2) т	Wittenberg (8–0) т	Luther (8–1) т	Northern Colorado (7–2)	Cal Poly (8–2) т	20.
21.			Florida A&M т								Northern Michigan (8–2) т	21.
	Week 1 Sept 23 (Note: The UPI poll did not include won/loss records for the first three weeks. The won/loss records shown here have been copied from the AP poll where available.)	Week 2 Sept 30	Week 3 Oct 7	Week 4 Oct 14	Week 5 Oct 21	Week 6 Oct 28	Week 7 Nov 4 (Note: The UPI poll was missing a few won/loss records from week 7 onward. They have been filled in based on other research. This includes week 7: Southwest Louisiana & Northern Colorado; week 8: Alcorn A&M, Florida A&M & Wittenberg; week 9: Eastern Michigan; week 10: Northern Colorado; week 11: Central Missouri State, North Dakota & Northern Michigan.)	Week 8 Nov 11	Week 9 Nov 18	Week 10 Nov 25	Week 11 Dec 2	
		Dropped: 13 New Mexico Highlands; 14 Wittenberg; 17 Western Carolina; 19 Fresno State; 20 East Tennessee State	Dropped: 14 North Dakota; 15 Louisiana Tech; 17 Weber State; 19 Lamar Tech	Dropped: 8 Eastern Michigan; 17 Drake; 18 Boise State; 19 Howard Payne	Dropped: 11 Akron; 14 North Dakota; 16 Florida A&M; 17 Northern Colorado	Dropped: 18 Troy State	Dropped: 12 Northern Michigan; 18 Missouri–Rolla; 19 Cal Poly	Dropped: 15 Southwestern Louisiana; 17 Gustavus Adolphus; 18 Northern Colorado; 20 Fresno State	Dropped: 13 Southern Illinois; 17 Northeastern Oklahoma; 18 Linfield; 19 Florida A&M; 20 Wittenberg	Dropped: 18 Eastern Michigan; 19 Central Oklahoma	Dropped: 16 Eastern Kentucky; 17 Platteville State; 18 Luther; 20 Northern Colorado	
