= Jimmy Feix =

American football player and coach (1931–2014)

Biographical details
- Born: August 1, 1931
- Died: October 5, 2014 (aged 83); Bowling Green, Kentucky, U.S.

Playing career
- 1949–1952: Western Kentucky
- Position: Quarterback

Coaching career (HC unless noted)
- 1957–1967: Western Kentucky (assistant)
- 1968–1983: Western Kentucky

Administrative career (AD unless noted)
- 1986–1991: Western Kentucky

Head coaching record
- Overall: 106–56–6 (.649)
- Tournaments: 4–2 (NCAA D-II playoffs)

Accomplishments and honors

Championships
- 6 OVC (1970–1971, 1973, 1975, 1978, 1980)

Awards
- Western Kentucky Hilltoppers Jersey No. 66 retired; Little All-American (1952); 3× OVC Coach of the Year (1973, 1978, 1980); Fellowship of Christian Athletes Hall of Champions

James Wyne Feix (August 1, 1931 – October 5, 2014) was an American college football player and coach. He served as head football coach at Western Kentucky University 1968 to 1983, compiling a record of 106–56–6.

== Early life and playing career ==
Feix attended Barret Manual Training School, a predecessor to Henderson City High School in Henderson, Kentucky. He played quarterback for Western Kentucky University from 1949 to 1952. His first start came in the third game of the 1949 season. In reference to his early success Feix said "I got to play a lot and played early. I remember that I was surrounded with a lot of good athletes." In 1952, he became the first WKU athlete to be named an All-American. He was also named to the All-Ohio Valley Conference team in 1951 and 1952 and was named to the conference's all-time team in 1988. As a senior in 1952, Feix guided the Hilltoppers to their first OVC football championship with a 9–1 record and the school's first bowl game appearance. WKU was invited to the Refrigerator Bowl in Evansville, Ind. where they beat Arkansas State 34–19. Feix Stats were very impressive that year. He led the nation's college quarterbacks with a 63.1 percent completion percentage, making good on 111 of 176 passes for 1,581 yards and 15 touchdowns. He also ranked fourth in the country in passing and sixth in total offense. During his entire playing career at WKU his teams went 24–12–2.

Drafted by the NFL's New York Giants, he suffered an injury during a 1953 pre-season game forcing him to give up his playing career.

== Coaching career ==
Feix, after his injury, set off for the United States Air Force. One of his many responsibilities while serving for the Air Force was to coach baseball, football and volleyball teams on the base. One day, Feix was coaching a 15-year-old how to pick off a base runner and at that moment he realized what he wanted to do with his life. "There I was out on that field in the sunshine, the breeze blowing and the 15-year old eating up what I was talking about", Feix said. "I went home that day at noon and told my wife, Frankie, 'we're gonna get out of this air force. I'm gonna try to find a coaching job somewhere because I think I wanna be a coach.'"

After serving four years in the Air Force, Feix returned to WKU in 1957 to become the Assistant Football Coach under Coach Nick Denes. Feix was in charge of the offensive backfield. "I learned a lot from Coach Denes", Feix said. "He was a great man and a great coach. The principle [sic] thing I remember always is he emphasized that the player was the most important part of the program. The student athlete was the key and not to be carried away with how great a coach you were or what kind of facilities you had." In 1968 after 11 years as the Assistant Football Coach, Feix was promoted to Head Coach, replacing the retiring Nick Denes. Feix continued as head coach until his retirement in 1983.

As head coach at WKU, Feix's teams went 106–56–6, won or shared six OVC championships and were national runners-up in NCAA Division II in 1973 and 1975. He was named OVC's Coach of the year three times (1973, 1978, 1980) and he still remains the most winning football coach in WKU history (64.88%). Coach Feix's players were also successful. Feix produce nine AP all-Americans and 73 all-Ohio Valley Conference selections.

Coach Jimmy Feix has also been featured on a special edition 1984 Coke bottle commemorating his historic achievement as WKU's most winning coach. The bottle features a picture of Coach Feix, The words "The Winningest Coach in Western Kentucky Football History" and "Coke & Jimmy, A Winning Pair". The reverse has Coach Feix's overall record broken down by each season.

After his retirement, Coach Feix spent two years in Alumni Affairs before taking over as the university's Director of Athletics from 1986 to 1991. He is a charter member of WKU's Athletic Hall of Fame and WKU's football playing field has been named after him.

Western Kentucky University's brand new Alumni Center will have a ballroom named after Coach Feix. Coach Feix responded to this honor by saying "I have had so many wonderful memories at Western, from a football player in the University's first Bowl game, to being named a Football All-American, to coaching 11 years as an Assistant Coach and 16 years as a Head Coach, to my years in administration," he said. "We had some great games and made some wonderful memories—it would be impossible to choose just one as the best one." He died at a hospital in Bowling Green in 2014.

== Personal life ==
Feix lived in Bowling Green with his wife, Frankie. They had two children, Jimmy and Jeff. Coach Feix remained active at the school attending every home game he could. Having been diagnosed with Parkinsons Disease it became increasingly hard for him to attend all the games. Coach Feix gave speeches to the current football team as necessary. He continued to make a big impact on the current players. In 2011, senior running back Bobby Rainey and junior tight end Jack Doyle hand-delivered to Feix a team birthday card on his 80th birthday.

== Head coaching record ==
Year	Team	Overall	Conference	Standing	Bowl/playoffs
Western Kentucky Hilltoppers (Ohio Valley Conference) (1968–1981)
1968	Western Kentucky	7–2–1	5–2	T–2nd	
1969	Western Kentucky	6–3	5–2	2nd	
1970	Western Kentucky	8–1–1	5–1–1	1st	
1971	Western Kentucky	8–2	6–1	1st	
1972	Western Kentucky	7–3	5–2	2nd	
1973	Western Kentucky	12–1	7–0	1st	W Lehigh 25–16 (Division II playoff); W Grantland Rice Bowl (NCAA Division II Semifinal); L Camellia Bowl (NCAA Division II Championship)
1974	Western Kentucky	7–3	5–2	T–2nd	
1975	Western Kentucky	11–2	6–1	T–1st	W N. Iowa 14–12 (Division II playoff); W Grantland Rice Bowl (NCAA Division II Semifinal); L Camellia Bowl (NCAA Division II Championship)
1976	Western Kentucky	4–5–1	3–4	T–4th	
1977	Western Kentucky	1–8–1	1–5–1	8th	
1978	Western Kentucky	8–2	7–0	1st	
1979	Western Kentucky	5–5	3–3	4th	
1980	Western Kentucky	9–1	6–1	1st	
1981	Western Kentucky	6–5	4–4	T–4th	
Western Kentucky Hilltoppers (NCAA Division I-AA independent) (1982–1983)
1982	Western Kentucky	5–5			
1983	Western Kentucky	2–8–1			
Western Kentucky:		106–56–6	68–28–2		
Total:		106–56–6			

†From 1973 to 1977, the Grantland Rice Bowl was a national semifinal game for Division II and the Camellia Bowl was the championship game.
