= Bill Peck (American football) =

American football player and coach (1926–2017)

Biographical details
- Born: November 26, 1926; Hackensack, New Jersey, U.S.
- Died: April 22, 2017 (aged 90)

Playing career
- 1947–1950: Stetson
- Position: Guard

Coaching career (HC unless noted)
- c. 1952: Leesburg HS (FL) (assistant)
- 1953–1954: Columbia (DL)
- 1955–1958: Ridgefield Park HS (NJ)
- 1959–1964: Paramus HS (NJ)
- 1965–1968: Northern Illinois (OC/ends)
- 1969: Middle Tennessee (assistant)
- 1970–1974: Middle Tennessee

Head coaching record
- Overall: 27–25–2 (college)

Accomplishments and honors

Awards
- OVC Coach of the Year (1970)

William Bethule Peck (November 26, 1926 – April 22, 2017) was an American football player and coach. He served as the head football coach at Middle Tennessee State University from 1970 to 1974, compiling a record of 27–25–2.

== Head coaching record ==
=== College ===
Year	Team	Overall	Conference	Standing	Bowl/playoffs
Middle Tennessee Blue Raiders (Ohio Valley Conference) (1970–1974)
1970	Middle Tennessee	6–3–1	3–3–1	5th	
1971	Middle Tennessee	7–4	5–2	T–2nd	
1972	Middle Tennessee	7–3–1	4–2–1	3rd	
1973	Middle Tennessee	4–7	3–4	T–5th	
1974	Middle Tennessee	3–8	2–5	6th	
Middle Tennessee:		27–25–2	17–16–2		
Total:		27–25–2			
