= Jesse Clements =

American football and basketball coach (1927–1991)

Biographical details
- Born: March 7, 1927; Illinois, U.S.
- Died: April 1, 1991 (aged 64); Raleigh, North Carolina, U.S.

Playing career

Football
- 1949–1951: St. Augustine's

Basketball
- c. 1950: St. Augustine's
- Position: End

Coaching career (HC unless noted)

Football
- 1963–1965: St. Augustine's
- 1973–1974: Shaw
- 1977: North Carolina Central (interim co-HC)

Basketball
- 1958–1971: St. Augustine's
- 1979–1984: North Carolina Central

Head coaching record
- Overall: 21–26–3 (football)

Jesse Clements Jr. (March 7, 1927 – April 1, 1991) was an American college football and college basketball coach. He served as the head football coach at St. Augustine's College—now known as St. Augustine's University—in Raleigh, North Carolina from 1963 to 1965 and Shaw University in Raleigh from 1973 to 1974. He was the interim co-head football coach with Robert Jackson at North Carolina Central University in Durham, North Carolina for part of the 1977 season. Clements was also the head basketball coach at St. Augustine's from 1958 to 1971 and North Carolina Central from 1979 to 1984.

A native of Champaign, Illinois, Clements attended St. Augustine's. He died on April 1, 1991, at Rex Hospital in Raleigh.

== Head coaching record ==
=== Football ===
Year	Team	Overall	Conference	Standing	Bowl/playoffs
St. Augustine's Falcons (Central Intercollegiate Athletic Association) (1963–1965)
1963	St. Augustine's	4–3–1	4–2–1	6th	
1964	St. Augustine's	5–5	4–5	11th	
1965	St. Augustine's	8–1–1	6–1–1	4th	
St. Augustine's:		17–9–2	14–8–2		
Shaw Bears (Central Intercollegiate Athletic Association) (1973–1974)
1973	Shaw	1–6–1	1–5–1	T–9th	
1974	Shaw	3–7	2–4	8th	
Shaw:		4–13–1	2–9–1		
North Carolina Central Eagles (Central Intercollegiate Athletic Association) (1977)
1977	North Carolina Central	0–4 (Note: Willie Smith was North Carolina Central's head coach for the first seven games of the 1977 season before resigning. Clements and Robert Jackson served as co-interim head coaches for the final four games. North Carolina Central finished the year 1–10 overall and 0–6 in Mid-Eastern Athletic Conference (MEAC) play.)	0–3	7th	
North Carolina Central:		0–4	0–3		
Total:		21–26–3			
