= 1971 Chattanooga Moccasins football team =

American college football season

1971 Chattanooga Moccasins football
- Conference: Independent
- Record: 2–9
- Head coach: Harold Wilkes (4th season)
- Home stadium: Chamberlain Field

1971 NCAA College Division independents football records
	Conf.			Overall
Team	W	L	T	W		L		T
No. 1 Delaware		–		10	–	1	–	0
No. 5 Tennessee State		–		9	–	1	–	0
No. 2 McNeese State		–		9	–	1	–	1
Samford		–		8	–	1	–	0
Colorado College		–		7	–	1	–	0
No. 8 Akron		–		8	–	2	–	0
No. 3 Eastern Michigan		–		7	–	1	–	2
Arkansas AM&N		–		7	–	2	–	0
Indiana (PA)		–		7	–	2	–	0
Kentucky State		–		8	–	3	–	0
Appalachian State		–		7	–	3	–	1
Northern Michigan		–		7	–	3	–	0
Hawaii		–		7	–	4	–	0
Illinois College		–		5	–	3	–	0
Ashland		–		6	–	4	–	0
Santa Clara		–		6	–	4	–	0
Southern Illinois		–		6	–	4	–	0
Tampa		–		6	–	5	–	0
UNLV		–		5	–	4	–	1
Bucknell		–		5	–	5	–	0
Central Michigan		–		5	–	5	–	0
Milwaukee		–		5	–	5	–	0
Nevada		–		5	–	5	–	0
St. Norbert		–		5	–	5	–	0
Wayne State (MI)		–		4	–	4	–	0
Hofstra		–		5	–	6	–	0
Cortland		–		4	–	5	–	0
Northeastern		–		4	–	5	–	0
Portland State		–		4	–	5	–	0
Ball State		–		4	–	5	–	1
Chicago		–		3	–	4	–	0
Northeast Louisiana		–		4	–	6	–	1
Eastern Illinois		–		4	–	6	–	0
Indiana State		–		4	–	6	–	0
Saint Mary's		–		3	–	5	–	0
Rose-Hulman		–		3	–	6	–	0
Boston University		–		3	–	7	–	0
Drexel		–		2	–	6	–	0
Chattanooga		–		2	–	9	–	0
Rankings from AP small college poll

The 1971 Chattanooga Moccasins football team was an American football team that represented the University of Tennessee at Chattanooga during the 1971 NCAA College Division football season. In their fourth year under head coach Harold Wilkes, the team compiled a 2–9 record.

== Schedule ==
Date	Opponent	Site	Result	Attendance	Source
September 11	at Vanderbilt	Dudley Field; Nashville, TN	L 19–20	14,629	
September 18	at No. 7 (UD) Auburn	Cliff Hare Stadium; Auburn, AL	L 7–60	45,000	
September 25	No. 13 Tampa	Chamberlain Field; Chattanooga, TN	L 14–31	10,000–10,205	
October 2	at Middle Tennessee	Horace Jones Field; Murfreesboro, TN	L 13–23	10,500–11,000	
October 9	Northeast Louisiana	Chamberlain Field; Chattanooga, TN	L 21–27	2,000	
October 16	East Tennessee State^{†}	Chamberlain Field; Chattanooga, TN	W 28–14	5,000	
October 23	at The Citadel	Johnson Hagood Stadium; Charleston, SC	L 35–52	9,740	
October 30	Tennessee Tech	Chamberlain Field; Chattanooga, TN	L 7–14	6,000	
November 6	No. 5 Louisiana Tech	Chamberlain Field; Chattanooga, TN	L 20–35	5,000	
November 13	at Ole Miss	Hemingway Stadium; Oxford, MS	L 10–49	22,190	
November 20	at VMI	Alumni Memorial Field; Lexington, VA	W 31–8	3,500	
^{†}Homecoming; Rankings from AP Poll released prior to the game
