= Tillman Sease =

American football and baseball coach (1916–1988)

Biographical details
- Born: September 6, 1916
- Died: September 2, 1988 (aged 71); Cheverly, Maryland, U.S.

Coaching career (HC unless noted)

Football
- 1948–1955: Christiansburg Institute
- 1956–1958: Bluefield State (assistant)
- 1959–1961: Bluefield State
- 1962–1968: Howard
- 1970–1972: Howard

Basketball
- 1948–1956: Christiansburg Institute
- 1956–1958: Bluefield State (assistant)

Baseball
- 1949–1955: Christiansburg Institute
- 1967: Howard

Administrative career (AD unless noted)
- 1959–1961: Bluefield State

Head coaching record
- Overall: 53–58–1 (college football); 5–9 (college baseball)

Tillman R. Sease Sr. (September 6, 1916 – September 2, 1988) was an American football and baseball coach. He served as the head football coach at Bluefield State College in Bluefield, West Virginia from 1959 to 1961 and Howard University in Washington, D.C. from 1962 to 1968 and from 1970 to 1972, compiling a career college football coaching record of 53–58–1. He was also Howard's head baseball coach.

A native of York, Pennsylvania, Sease graduated from Bluefield State in 1948 and later earned a master's degree in education from Columbia University. From 1948 to 1956, he was the athletic director at Christiansburg Institute in Christiansburg, Virginia, where he also coached football, basketball, and baseball. Sease returned to Bluefield State in 1956, where he worked as an assistant football and basketball coach under Sam B. Taylor for three years. He was appointed athletic director at Bluefield State in 1959.

== Head coaching record ==
=== College football ===
Year	Team	Overall	Conference	Standing	Bowl/playoffs
Bluefield State Big Blues (Central Intercollegiate Athletic Association) (1959)
1959	Bluefield State	3–6	1–4	16th	
Bluefield State Big Blues () (1969–1961)
1960	Bluefield State	3–5			
1961	Bluefield State	3–3–1			
Bluefield State:		9–14–1			
Howard Bison (Central Intercollegiate Athletic Association) (1962–1968)
1962	Howard	1–8	0–6	18th	
1963	Howard	4–5	1–4	15th	
1964	Howard	8–2	4–1	3rd	
1965	Howard	5–3	2–3	10th	
1966	Howard	4–4	2–3	12th	
1967	Howard	2–6	2–3	12th	
1968	Howard	3–5	2–3	9th	
Howard Bison (Central Intercollegiate Athletic Association) (1970)
1970	Howard	7–2	3–2	4th	
Howard Bison (Mid-Eastern Athletic Conference) (1971–1972)
1971	Howard	4–5	1–5	T–6th	
1972	Howard	6–4	2–4	T–5th	
Howard:		44–44	19–34		
Total:		53–58–1			
