= Russ Faulkinberry =

American football player and coach (1928–2005)

Biographical details
- Born: November 3, 1928; Murfreesboro, Tennessee, U.S.
- Died: November 16, 2005 (aged 77); Lafayette, Louisiana, U.S.

Playing career
- 1947–1950: Vanderbilt
- Position: Tackle

Coaching career (HC unless noted)
- 1956: Southeastern Louisiana (line)
- 1957: Iowa State (assistant)
- 1958–1959: Texas A&M (assistant)
- 1960: Nebraska (assistant)
- 1961–1973: Southwestern Louisiana

Head coaching record
- Overall: 66–63–2
- Bowls: 0–1

Accomplishments and honors

Championships
- 3 Gulf State (1965, 1968, 1970)

Awards
- Second-team All-SEC (1950)

Russell Miller Faulkinberry (November 3, 1928 – November 16, 2005) was an American college football player and coach. He served as the head football coach at the University of Southwestern Louisiana—now known as the University of Louisiana at Lafayette—from 1961 to 1973, compiling a record of 66–63–2. Faulkinberry played college football as a tackle at Vanderbilt University from 1947 to 1950. As a senior, he was captain of the 1950 Vanderbilt Commodores football team and was named to the 1950 All-SEC football team. Faulkinberry was an assistant coach at Southeastern Louisiana University, Iowa State University, Texas A&M University, and the University of Nebraska–Lincoln before he was hired at Southwestern Louisiana. He died on November 16, 2005, after a long illness. Faulkinberry was the son of football coach Frank Faulkinberry.

Faulkinberry's tenure brought about the change of Southwestern Louisiana's fight name from the "Bulldogs" to the "Raging Cajuns". One of his assistant coaches once remarked, "Go out there and rage like a bunch of Cajuns!" The phrase stuck both because a majority of the players were from south Louisiana and because fans, students, and alumni loved the phrase. Later on, the University of Southwestern Louisiana trademarked the phrase and, to this day, the sports teams are known as the "Ragin' Cajuns."

== Military service ==
Faulkinberry served in the United States Navy during the Korean War.

== Death ==
Faulkinberry died on November 16, 2005, in Lafayette, Louisiana, at the age of 77. He was buried in Lafayette Memorial Park.

== Head coaching record ==
Year	Team	Overall	Conference	Standing	Bowl/playoffs
Southwestern Louisiana Bulldogs (Gulf States Conference) (1960–1970)
1961	Southwestern Louisiana	2–8	0–5	6th	
1962	Southwestern Louisiana	4–5–1	2–3	T–4th	
1963	Southwestern Louisiana	4–5	1–4	T–5th	
1964	Southwestern Louisiana	5–4	2–3	4th	
1965	Southwestern Louisiana	7–3	4–1	T–1st	
1966	Southwestern Louisiana	6–4	3–2	T–2nd	
1967	Southwestern Louisiana	6–4	3–2	T–2nd	
1968	Southwestern Louisiana	8–2	4–1	1st	
1969	Southwestern Louisiana	5–5	3–2	3rd	
1970	Southwestern Louisiana	9–3	5–0	1st	L Grantland Rice
Southwestern Louisiana Bulldogs (Southland Conference) (1971–1973)
1971	Southwestern Louisiana	5–4–1	2–2–1	4th	
1972	Southwestern Louisiana	5–6	1–4	T–5th	
1973	Southwestern Louisiana	0–10	0–5	6th	
Southwestern Louisiana:		66–63–2	30–34–1		
Total:		66–63–2			
National championship Conference title Conference division title or championship game berth
