= List of North Carolina A&T Aggies in the NFL draft =

This list of North Carolina A&T Aggies football players in the NFL draft includes alumni of North Carolina Agricultural & Technical State University that have been drafted into the National Football League (NFL) since the league began holding drafts in 1936. (Note: Because of the NFL–AFL merger agreement, the history of the AFL is officially recognized by the NFL and therefore this list includes the AFL draft (1960–1966) and the common draft (1967–1969).) Of the 33 Aggie players listed below, Bob "Stonewall" Jackson was the first player from an HBCU to be drafted by an NFL team. 3 Former A&T players have been selected to a Pro Bowl or league All-Star Game, 3 have won a championship with their respective teams and 1 has been elected to the Pro Football Hall of Fame.

Each NFL franchise seeks to add new players through the annual NFL draft. The draft rules were last updated in 2009. The team with the worst record the previous year picks first, the next-worst team second, and so on. Teams that did not make the playoffs are ordered by their regular-season record with any remaining ties broken by strength of schedule. Playoff participants are sequenced after non-playoff teams, based on their round of elimination (wild card, division, conference, and Super Bowl). Prior to the merger agreements in 1966, the American Football League (AFL) operated in direct competition with the NFL and held a separate draft. This led to a bidding war over top prospects between the two leagues. As part of the merger agreement on June 8, 1966, the two leagues held a multiple-round "common draft". Once the AFL officially merged with the NFL in 1970, the common craft became the NFL draft.

== Key ==
B	Back	K	Kicker	NT	Nose tackle
C	Center	LB	Linebacker	FB	Fullback
DB	Defensive back	P	Punter	HB	Halfback
DE	Defensive end	QB	Quarterback	WR	Wide receiver
DT	Defensive tackle	RB	Running back	G	Guard
E	End	T	Offensive tackle	TE	Tight end

^{*}	Selected to an all-star game (AFL All-Star game, NFL All-Star game or Pro Bowl)
^{†}	Won a league championship (AFL championship, NFL championship, or Super Bowl)
^{‡}	Inducted into Pro Football Hall of Fame

== Selections ==
Draft Year	Round	Pick in round	Overall pick	Team drafted to	Player	Position	Notes	Reference
1950	16	6	202	New York Giants	Bob "Stonewall" Jackson	FB	First player from an HBCU to be drafted in the NFL Draft	
1955	15	10	179	Chicago Bears	J.D. Smith	FB		
1959	22	6	258	San Francisco 49ers	Burnio McQueen	End		
1960	20	1	229	St. Louis Cardinals	Tom Day*†	DE	AFL All-Star Game (1965); AFL championship (1964, 1965);	
1961 (AFL)	26	4	204	Buffalo Bills	Lorenzo Stanford	T		
1962	20	1	229	New York Giants	Joe Taylor	CB		
1963	18	5	243	Baltimore Colts	Luther Woodruff	T		
1964 (AFL)	23	3	179	New York Jets	Cornell Gordon†	DB	AFL championship (1968); Super Bowl Champion (III)	
1964 (NFL)	16	1	211	San Francisco 49ers	Cornell Gordon	DB	Cornell Gordon elected to sign with the New York Jets of the AFL who had their draft 2 Days Earlier on Saturday November 30.	
1965 (AFL)	6	6	46	San Diego Chargers	Will Beasley	FB		
1966 (AFL)	19	-	172	Buffalo Bills	Mel Phillips	DB	Elected to sign with the San Francisco 49ers of the NFL who held their draft on the same night	
1966 (NFL)	5	5	69	San Francisco 49ers	Mel Phillips	DB		
1968	5	5	69	Houston Oilers	Elvin Bethea*‡	DE	Pro Bowl (1969, 1971,); Pro Football Hall of Fame (2003)	
1968	16	9	411	La Rams	Henry Hipps	LB		
1969	5	11	115	Miami Dolphins	Willie Pearson	DB		
1971	5	8	112	Pittsburgh Steelers	Melvin Holmes	OT		
1972	8	26	208	Dallas Cowboys	Ralph Coleman	LB		
1972	11	26	286	Dallas Cowboys	Lonnie Leonard	LB		
1972	16	20	410	Oakland Raiders	Willie Wright	TE		
1973	11	15	275	New York Giants	William Wideman	DT		
1975	13	26	338	Washington Redskins	Morris McKie	DB		
1976	12	2	321	Tampa Bay Buccaneers	George Ragsdale	DB		
1979	5	27	137	Pittsburgh Steelers	Dwaine Board†	DE	Super Bowl Champion (XVI, XIX, XXIII, XXIX)	
1982	11	11	290	St. Louis Cardinals	James Williams	DE		
1982	9	-	-	St. Louis Cardinals	Kevin Robinson	DE	Kevin Robinson was a supplemental draft pick.	
1984	12	14	322	Minnesota Vikings	Mike Jones	RB		
1985	11	3	283	Minnesota Vikings	Tim Williams	DB		
1992	5	3	115	Cincinnati Bengals	Craig Thompson	TE		
1992	5	19	131	San Diego Chargers	Kevin Little	LB		
1992	6	7	147	San Diego Chargers	Reggie White	DT		
1994	6	28	198	Los Angeles Rams	Ronald Edwards	OT		
1996	1	29	29	Pittsburgh Steelers	Jamain Stephens	OT		
1997	3	14	78	San Diego Chargers	Mike Hamilton	LB		
1997	7	14	215	St. Louis Rams	Cedric White	DE		
1997	7	17	218	San Diego Chargers	Toran James	LB		
2005	5	7	143	Green Bay Packers	Junius Coston	G		
2017	4	12	119	Chicago Bears	Tarik Cohen	RB	Pro Bowl (2018)	
2018	3	1	65	Oakland Raiders	Brandon Parker	OL		
2019	7	11	225	Buffalo Bills	Darryl Johnson Jr.	DE		
