= Gene Offield =

American football player and coach (1927–2005)

Biographical details
- Born: September 10, 1927; Breckenridge, Texas, U.S.
- Died: April 27, 2005 (aged 77)

Playing career
- 1948–1951: Hardin–Simmons
- Position: Center

Coaching career (HC unless noted)
- 1966–1967: New Mexico State (assistant)
- 1970–1971: Trinity (TX)

Head coaching record
- Overall: 13–8

Accomplishments and honors

Championships
- 1 SLC (1971)

Eugene Offield (September 10, 1927 – April 27, 2005) was an American football player and coach. He served as the head football coach at Trinity University in San Antonio, Texas from 1970 to 1971, compiling a record of 13–8. Offield was selected 249th overall in the 21st round by the San Francisco 49ers in the 1952 NFL draft. He coached high school football in the state of Texas and was an assistant football coach at New Mexico State University from 1966 to 1967.

== Head coaching record ==
| Year | Team | Overall | Conference | Standing | Bowl/playoffs |
|---|---|---|---|---|---|
Trinity Tigers (Southland Conference) (1970–1971)
| 1970 | Trinity | 5–6 | 2–2 | 3rd | |
| 1971 | Trinity | 8–2 | 4–1 | T–1st | |
| Trinity: | | 13–8 | 6–3 | | |
| Total: | | 13–8 | | | |
National championship Conference title Conference division title or championship game berth
