= Oree Banks =

American football player and coach

Biographical details
- Born: c. 1936; Newton, Mississippi, U.S.

Playing career
- 1956–1958: Kansas State
- Position: End

Coaching career (HC unless noted)
- 1960–1963: Coahoma
- 1964: Grambling State (assistant)
- 1965–1972: South Carolina State
- 1973–1974: South Carolina (assistant)
- 1975: Virginia (assistant)
- 1976: Wisconsin (assistant)
- 1977–1983: West Virginia State
- 1986–1989: Marshall (assistant)

Head coaching record
- Overall: 76–63–3 (college)

Accomplishments and honors

Championships
- 1 WVIAC Southern Division (1979)

Awards
- SIAC Coach of the Year (1965)

Oree Banks (born c. 1936) is an American former college football player and coach. He served as the head football coach at South Carolina State University from 1965 to 1972 and at West Virginia State University from 1977 to 1983, compiling a career college football head coaching record of 76–63–3. Banks was the first African American to be hired as a full-time assistant coach in the history of the University of South Carolina.

== Head coaching record ==
=== College ===
Year	Team	Overall	Conference	Standing	Bowl/playoffs
South Carolina State Bulldogs (Southern Intercollegiate Athletic Conference) (1965–1970)
1965	South Carolina State	8–1		2nd	
1966	South Carolina State	7–2			
1967	South Carolina State	7–1		(Division I)	
1968	South Carolina State	7–2	4–1	2nd (Division I)	
1969	South Carolina State	5–3–1	1–2–1	4th (Division I)	
1970	South Carolina State	3–6	1–4	T–7th (Division I)	
South Carolina State Bulldogs (Mid-Eastern Athletic Conference) (1971–1972)s
1971	South Carolina State	6–3–1	3–2–1	T–3rd	
1972	South Carolina State	1–9	0–6	7th	
South Carolina State:		44–27–2			
West Virginia State Yellow Jackets (West Virginia Intercollegiate Athletic Conference) (1977–1983)
1977	West Virginia State	2–8	2–2	3rd (Southern)	
1978	West Virginia State	6–4	6–3	T–2nd (Southern)	
1979	West Virginia State	6–5	6–3	1st (Southern)	
1980	West Virginia State	6–4	6–3	2nd (Southern)	
1981	West Virginia State	3–5–1	2–5–1	T–6th	
1982	West Virginia State	6–3–1	5–3	4th	
1983	West Virginia State	3–7	2–6	T–7th	
West Virginia State:		32–36–2	29–25–1		
Total:		76–63–3			
National championship Conference title Conference division title or championship game berth
