= Harold Wilkes =

American football player, coach, and administrator (1932–2017)

Biographical details
- Born: September 11, 1932; Valley Head, Alabama, U.S.
- Died: December 23, 2017 (aged 85)

Playing career
- 1956–1958: Chattanooga

Coaching career (HC unless noted)
- ?–1967: Chattanooga (line)
- 1968–1972: Chattanooga

Administrative career (AD unless noted)
- 1970–1990: Chattanooga

Head coaching record
- Overall: 20–23

Harold Brice Wilkes (September 11, 1932 – December 23, 2017) was an American football coach and college athletic administrator. He served as the head football coach at the University of Chattanooga from 1968 to 1972, compiling a record of 20–23. Wilkes was also the athletic director at Chattanooga from 1970 to 1990.

== Head coaching record ==
Year	Team	Overall	Conference	Standing	Bowl/playoffs
Chattanooga Moccasins (NCAA College Division independent) (1968–1972)
1968	Chattanooga	9–1			
1969	Chattanooga	4–6			
1970	Chattanooga	3–8			
1971	Chattanooga	2–9			
1972	Chattanooga	2–9			
Chattanooga:		20–23			
Total:		20–23			
