= 1971 East Tennessee State Buccaneers football team =

American college football season

1971 East Tennessee State Buccaneers football
- Conference: Ohio Valley Conference
- Record: 0–9–1 (0–6–1 OVC)
- Head coach: John Robert Bell (6th season)
- Home stadium: Memorial Stadium

1971 Ohio Valley Conference football standings
| | Conf. | | | | | Overall |
| Team | W | | L | | T | W | | L | | T |
|---|---|---|---|---|---|---|---|---|---|---|
| No. 6/12 Western Kentucky $ | 6 | – | 1 | – | 0 | 8 | – | 2 | – | 0 |
| Tennessee Tech | 5 | – | 2 | – | 0 | 8 | – | 2 | – | 0 |
| Middle Tennessee | 5 | – | 2 | – | 0 | 7 | – | 4 | – | 0 |
| Morehead State | 4 | – | 3 | – | 0 | 7 | – | 3 | – | 0 |
| Murray State | 3 | – | 3 | – | 1 | 5 | – | 4 | – | 1 |
| Eastern Kentucky | 3 | – | 4 | – | 0 | 5 | – | 6 | – | 0 |
| Austin Peay | 1 | – | 6 | – | 0 | 2 | – | 8 | – | 0 |
| East Tennessee State | 0 | – | 6 | – | 1 | 0 | – | 9 | – | 1 |
$ – Conference champion; Rankings from AP/UPI small college polls

The 1971 East Tennessee State Buccaneers football team represented East Tennessee State University as a member of the Ohio Valley Conference (OVC) during the 1971 NCAA College Division football season. Led by sixth-year head coach John Robert Bell, the Buccaneers compiled an overall record of 0–9–1, with a mark of 0–6–1 in conference play, and finished eighth in the OVC.

== Schedule ==
| Date | Opponent | Site | Result | Attendance | Source |
|---|---|---|---|---|---|
| September 11 | Carson–Newman* | Memorial Stadium; Johnson City, TN | L 10–17 | 6,000 | |
| September 18 | Appalachian State* | Memorial Stadium; Johnson City, TN | L 24–28 | 7,000 | |
| September 25 | Eastern Kentucky | Memorial Stadium; Johnson City, TN | L 14–28 | 6,300 | |
| October 2 | at No. 4 Western Kentucky | L. T. Smith Stadium; Bowling Green, KY | L 7–36 | 16,276 | |
| October 9 | at Tennessee Tech | Tucker Stadium; Cookeville, TN | L 3–20 | 9,000 | |
| October 16 | at Chattanooga* | Chamberlain Field; Chattanooga, TN | L 14–28 | 6,000 | |
| October 23 | Murray State | Memorial Stadium; Johnson City, TN | T 6–6 | 5,500 | |
| November 6 | at Morehead State | Jayne Stadium; Morehead, KY | L 7–19 | 6,000 | |
| November 13 | Middle Tennessee | Memorial Stadium; Johnson City, TN | L 23–27 | 6,000 | |
| November 20 | at Austin Peay | Municipal Stadium; Clarksville, TN | L 0–33 | 4,160 | |
*Non-conference game; Rankings from AP Poll released prior to the game; Source:
