= Jim Hillyer =

Jim Hillyer may refer to:

- Jim Hillyer (American football) (1928–1991), American college football coach
- Jim Hillyer (politician) (1974–2016), Canadian politician
