= 1975 Grantland Rice Bowl =

Western Kentucky Hilltoppers	New Hampshire Wildcats
(10–1)	(9–2)
Ohio Valley Conference	Yankee Conference
14	3
Head coach: Jimmy Feix	Head coach: Bill Bowes
	1	2	3	4	Total
Western Kentucky	7	7	0	0	14
New Hampshire	0	3	0	0	3
- Date: December 6, 1975
- Season: 1975
- Stadium: Tiger Stadium
- Location: Baton Rouge, Louisiana
- Attendance: 6,000

The 1975 Grantland Rice Bowl was an NCAA Division II game following the 1975 season, between the Western Kentucky Hilltoppers and the New Hampshire Wildcats. This was the second and last time that the game was played at Tiger Stadium on the campus of LSU. WKU defensive tackle Sam Fields was named the game's outstanding defensive player, while his teammate running back Lawrence Jefferson was named the game's outstanding offensive player.

== Notable participants ==
WKU wide receiver Rick Caswell was selected in the 1976 NFL draft, while center David Carter was selected in the 1977 NFL draft. Carter, linebacker Rick Green, and head coach Jimmy Feix are inductees of the WKU Athletic Hall of Fame.

New Hampshire linebacker Dave Rozumek was selected in the 1976 NFL Draft. Linebacker Bruce Huther was undrafted in 1977, but later played in the NFL. Rozumek, Huther, center Kevin Martell, quarterback Jeff Allen, tackle Grady Vigneau, and head coach Bill Bowes are inductees of the New Hampshire hall of fame. Bowes is an inductee of the College Football Hall of Fame.

== Scoring summary ==
Scoring summary

Quarter	Time	Drive			Team	Scoring information	Score	
Quarter	Time	Plays	Yards	TOP	Team	Scoring information	WKU	UNH
1		8	43		WKU	Steve Larimore 1-yard touchdown run, Barry Henry kick good	7	0
2	13:23		22		UNH	27-yard field goal by Dave Teggart	7	3
2					WKU	Rick Caswell 87-yard punt return, Barry Henry kick good	14	3
"TOP" = time of possession. For other American football terms, see Glossary of American football.							14	3
