= 1971 Maryland Eastern Shore Hawks football team =

American college football season

1971 Maryland Eastern Shore Hawks football
- Conference: Mid-Eastern Athletic Conference
- Record: 1–5–2 (1–4–1 MEAC)
- Head coach: Willie Smith (1st season)

1971 Mid-Eastern Athletic Conference football standings
	Conf.					Overall
Team	W		L		T	W		L		T
Morgan State $	5	–	0	–	1	6	–	4	–	1
North Carolina Central	5	–	1	–	0	7	–	2	–	0
South Carolina State	3	–	2	–	1	6	–	3	–	1
North Carolina A&T	3	–	2	–	1	6	–	4	–	1
Maryland Eastern Shore	1	–	4	–	1	1	–	5	–	2
Howard	1	–	5	–	0	4	–	5	–	0
Delaware State	1	–	5	–	0	1	–	8	–	0
$ – Conference champion

The 1971 Maryland Eastern Shore Hawks football team represented the University of Maryland Eastern Shore as a member of the Mid-Eastern Athletic Conference (MEAC) during the 1971 NCAA College Division football season. Led by first-year head coach Willie Smith, the Hawks compiled an overall record of 1–5–2, with a mark of 1–4–1 in conference play, and finished fifth in the MEAC.

== Schedule ==
Date	Opponent	Site	Result	Attendance	Source
September 18	vs. Howard	Harvard Stadium; Boston, MA	W 20–7	6,000	
October 2	Virginia Union*	Princess Anne, MD	T 0–0		
October 9	at Morgan State	Hughes Stadium; Baltimore, MD	T 13–13	7,500	
October 16	at North Carolina A&T	World War Memorial Stadium; Greensboro, NC	L 7–13	18,742	
October 23	North Carolina Central	Princess Anne, MD	L 0–7	100	
October 30	Delaware State	Princess Anne, MD	L 6–7		
November 6	South Carolina State	Princess Anne, MD	L 0–27	500	
November 13	at Virginia State*	Rogers Stadium; Ettrick, VA	L 6–28		
*Non-conference game
