= 1971 South Carolina State Bulldogs football team =

American college football season

1971 South Carolina State Bulldogs football
- Conference: Mid-Eastern Athletic Conference
- Record: 6–3–1 (3–2–1 MEAC)
- Head coach: Oree Banks (7th season)
- Home stadium: State College Stadium

1971 Mid-Eastern Athletic Conference football standings
	Conf.					Overall
Team	W		L		T	W		L		T
Morgan State $	5	–	0	–	1	6	–	4	–	1
North Carolina Central	5	–	1	–	0	7	–	2	–	0
South Carolina State	3	–	2	–	1	6	–	3	–	1
North Carolina A&T	3	–	2	–	1	6	–	4	–	1
Maryland Eastern Shore	1	–	4	–	1	1	–	5	–	2
Howard	1	–	5	–	0	4	–	5	–	0
Delaware State	1	–	5	–	0	1	–	8	–	0
$ – Conference champion

The 1971 South Carolina State Bulldogs football team represented South Carolina State College (now known as South Carolina State University) as a member of the Mid-Eastern Athletic Conference (MEAC) during the 1971 NCAA College Division football season. Led by seventh-year head coach Oree Banks, the Eagles compiled an overall record of 6–3–1, with a mark of 3–2–1 in conference play, and finished tied for third in the MEAC.

== Schedule ==
Date	Opponent	Site	Result	Attendance	Source
September 11	at Bethune–Cookman*	Municipal Stadium; Daytona Beach, FL	W 9–0	5,000	
September 18	North Carolina A&T	State College Stadium; Orangeburg, SC (rivalry)	T 0–0	8,537	
September 25	Howard	State College Stadium; Orangeburg, SC	W 10–0	4,500–10,000	
October 2	at Florida A&M*	Bragg Memorial Stadium; Tallahassee, FL	L 7–28	14,500	
October 9	Tuskegee*	State College Stadium; Orangeburg, SC	W 9–7	4,525	
October 16	Morgan State	State College Stadium; Orangeburg, SC	L 0–21	7,000–8,000	
October 30	at North Carolina Central	O'Kelly Field; Durham, NC	L 12–21	3,250	
November 6	at Maryland Eastern Shore	Princess Anne, MD	W 27–0	500	
November 13	Alabama A&M*	State College Stadium; Orangeburg, SC	W 38–14	10,215	
November 20	Delaware State	State College Stadium; Orangeburg, SC	W 37–0	3,500	
*Non-conference game
