= 1971 Louisiana Tech Bulldogs football team =

American college football season

1971 Louisiana Tech Bulldogs football

NCAA College Division Midwest Region champion Southland champion Pioneer Bowl champion

Pioneer Bowl, W 14–3 vs. Eastern Michigan
- Conference: Southland Conference
- Record: 9–2 (4–1 Southland)
- Head coach: Maxie Lambright (5th season)
- Captains: Ken Lantrip; Chris Richardson
- Home stadium: Louisiana Tech Stadium

1971 Southland Conference football standings
| | Conf. | | | | | Overall |
| Team | W | | L | | T | W | | L | | T |
|---|---|---|---|---|---|---|---|---|---|---|
| No. 4 Louisiana Tech + | 4 | – | 1 | – | 0 | 9 | – | 2 | – | 0 |
| Trinity (TX) + | 4 | – | 1 | – | 0 | 8 | – | 2 | – | 0 |
| Lamar + | 4 | – | 1 | – | 0 | 5 | – | 6 | – | 0 |
| SW Louisiana | 2 | – | 2 | – | 1 | 5 | – | 4 | – | 1 |
| Arkansas State | 1 | – | 3 | – | 1 | 4 | – | 4 | – | 1 |
| UT Arlington | 1 | – | 4 | – | 0 | 2 | – | 9 | – | 0 |
| Abilene Christian | 0 | – | 4 | – | 0 | 5 | – | 5 | – | 0 |
$ – Conference champion; Rankings from AP small college poll

The 1971 Louisiana Tech Bulldogs football team was an American football team that represented Louisiana Tech University as a member of the Southland Conference during the 1971 NCAA College Division football season. In their fifth year under head coach Maxie Lambright, the team compiled a 9–2 record, were Southland Conference champion, as well as defeated Eastern Michigan in the Pioneer Bowl.

== Schedule ==
| Date | Opponent | Rank | Site | Result | Attendance | Source |
|---|---|---|---|---|---|---|
| September 18 | at Tampa* | | Tampa Stadium; Tampa, FL | W 28–20 | 27,333 | |
| September 25 | Lamar | No. T–9 | Louisiana Tech Stadium; Ruston, LA | W 26–7 | 13,800 | |
| October 2 | at McNeese State | No. 7 | Cowboy Stadium; Lake Charles, LA | L 22–29 | 13,500 | |
| October 9 | Southwestern Louisiana | | Louisiana Tech Stadium; Ruston, LA (rivalry) | W 35–15 | 15,200 | |
| October 16 | No. 6 Arkansas State | | Louisiana Tech Stadium; Ruston, LA | W 28–27 | 14,600 | |
| October 23 | vs. Northwestern State* | No. 10 | State Fair Stadium; Shreveport, LA (rivalry) | W 33–21 | 27,000 | |
| October 30 | at Southeastern Louisiana* | No. 8 | Strawberry Stadium; Hammond, LA | W 24–9 | 7,000 | |
| November 6 | at Chattanooga* | No. 5 | Chamberlain Field; Chattanooga, TN | W 35–20 | 5,000 | |
| November 13 | Southern Miss* | No. 4 | Louisiana Tech Stadium; Ruston, LA (rivalry) | L 20–24 | 17,000 | |
| November 20 | Northeast Louisiana* | No. 5 | Louisiana Tech Stadium; Ruston, LA (rivalry) | W 23–0 | 12,500 | |
| December 11 | vs. No. 3 Eastern Michigan* | No. 4 | Memorial Stadium; Wichita Falls, TX (Pioneer Bowl) | W 14–3 | 8,156 | |
*Non-conference game; Rankings from AP Poll released prior to the game
