= 1971 Middle Tennessee Blue Raiders football team =

American college football season

1971 Middle Tennessee Blue Raiders football
- Conference: Ohio Valley Conference
- Record: 7–4 (5–2 OVC)
- Head coach: Bill Peck (2nd season)
- Captains: Jim Inglis; Danny Buck
- Home stadium: Horace Jones Field

1971 Ohio Valley Conference football standings
	Conf.					Overall
Team	W		L		T	W		L		T
No. 6/12 Western Kentucky $	6	–	1	–	0	8	–	2	–	0
Tennessee Tech	5	–	2	–	0	8	–	2	–	0
Middle Tennessee	5	–	2	–	0	7	–	4	–	0
Morehead State	4	–	3	–	0	7	–	3	–	0
Murray State	3	–	3	–	1	5	–	4	–	1
Eastern Kentucky	3	–	4	–	0	5	–	6	–	0
Austin Peay	1	–	6	–	0	2	–	8	–	0
East Tennessee State	0	–	6	–	1	0	–	9	–	1
$ – Conference champion; Rankings from AP/UPI small college polls

The 1971 Middle Tennessee Blue Raiders football team represented Middle Tennessee State University—as a member of the Ohio Valley Conference (OVC) during the 1971 NCAA College Division football season. Led by second-year head coach Bill Peck, the Blue Raiders compiled a record an overall record of 7–4 with a mark of 5–2 in conference play, tying for second place in the OVC. The team's captains were Jim Inglis and Danny Buck.

== Schedule ==
Date	Opponent	Site	Result	Attendance	Source
September 11	at Florence State*	Braly Municipal Stadium; Florence, AL	L 14–24	6,500	
September 18	at Tennessee–Martin*	Pacer Stadium; Martin, TN	L 0–28	5,500	
September 25	at Morehead State	Jayne Stadium; Morehead, KY	W 9–7	8,000	
October 2	Chattanooga*	Horace Jones Field; Murfreesboro, TN	W 23–13	10,500–11,000	
October 9	Eastern Kentucky	Horace Jones Field; Murfreesboro, TN	W 31–18	7,500	
October 16	Murray State	Horace Jones Field; Murfreesboro, TN	L 15–24	5,000	
October 23	at Austin Peay	Clarksville Municipal Stadium; Clarksville, TN	W 19–7	2,576	
October 30	Ball State*	Horace Jones Field; Murfreesboro, TN	W 28–7	10,500	
November 6	No. 6 Western Kentucky	Horace Jones Field; Murfreesboro, TN (rivalry)	W 27–13	6,500	
November 13	at East Tennessee State	Memorial Stadium; Johnson City, TN	W 27–23	6,000	
November 20	Tennessee Tech	Horace Jones Field; Murfreesboro, TN	L 3–14	13,000	
*Non-conference game; Rankings from AP Poll released prior to the game; Source:
