= 1973 Grantland Rice Bowl =

- 1973 Program cover
Grambling Tigers	Western Kentucky Hilltoppers
(10–2)	(10–1)
Southwestern Athletic Conference	Ohio Valley Conference
20	28
Head coach: Eddie Robinson	Head coach: Jimmy Feix
	1	2	3	4	Total
Grambling	7	0	7	6	20
Western Kentucky	7	14	0	7	28
- Date: December 8, 1973
- Season: 1973
- Stadium: BREC Memorial Stadium
- Location: Baton Rouge, Louisiana
- Attendance: 15,000

The 1973 Grantland Rice Bowl was an NCAA Division II game following the 1973 season, between the Grambling Tigers (now the Grambling State Tigers) and the Western Kentucky Hilltoppers. This was the first year that the game served as a national semifinal for Division II – in prior years it had been the Mideast regional championship for the College Division. This was the last time that the game was played at BREC Memorial Stadium.

== Notable participants ==
Western Kentucky defensive back Mike McCoy and running back Clarence Jackson were selected in the 1974 NFL draft. Defensive back Virgil Livers and defensive end John Bushong were selected in the 1975 NFL draft. McCoy, Jackson, Livers, linebacker Rick Green, wide receiver Porter Williams, and head coach Jimmy Feix are inductees of the WKU Athletic Hall of Fame.

Grambling defensive end Charles Battle, defensive back Bill Bryant, defensive end Ezil Bibbs, and tight end Oliver Alexander were selected in the 1974 NFL Draft. Defensive tackle Gary Johnson, defensive end Bob Barber, and defensive end Jesse O'Neal were selected in the 1975 NFL Draft. Grambling players selected in the 1976 NFL draft include cornerback James Hunter, wide receiver Sammy White, tight end Ron Singleton, and linebacker Robert Pennywell. Johnson, Hunter, White, and head coach Eddie Robinson are inductees of the Grambling Legends Sports Hall of Fame. Johnson and Robinson are inductees of the College Football Hall of Fame.

== Scoring summary ==
Scoring summary

Quarter	Time	Drive			Team	Scoring information	Score	
Quarter	Time	Plays	Yards	TOP	Team	Scoring information	GC	WKU
1	5:30	2	15		GC	Sammy White 15-yard touchdown reception from Joe Comeaux, Rodney Zeno kick good	7	0
1	4:18		74		WKU	John Embree 46-yard touchdown run, Charlie Johnson kick good	7	7
2	7:56		65		WKU	Clarence Jackson 16-yard touchdown reception from Dennis Tomek, Charlie Johnson kick good	7	14
2	1:23	4	13	1:44	WKU	Clarence Jackson 2-yard touchdown run, Charlie Johnson kick good	7	21
3	0:00				GC	Interception returned 87 yards for touchdown by Robert Pennywell, Rodney Zeno kick good	14	21
4	10:55		75		GC	Joe Comeaux 10-yard touchdown run, Rodney Zeno kick failed (blocked)	20	21
4	7:57	3	25	0:25	WKU	David Maley 22-yard touchdown reception from Dennis Tomek, Charlie Johnson kick good	20	28
"TOP" = time of possession. For other American football terms, see Glossary of American football.							20	28
