= 1971 Lamar Cardinals football team =

American college football season

1971 Lamar Cardinals football

Southland co-champion
- Conference: Southland Conference
- Record: 5–6 (4–1 Southland)
- Head coach: Vernon Glass (9th season)
- Home stadium: Cardinal Stadium

1971 Southland Conference football standings
	Conf.					Overall
Team	W		L		T	W		L		T
No. 4 Louisiana Tech +	4	–	1	–	0	9	–	2	–	0
Trinity (TX) +	4	–	1	–	0	8	–	2	–	0
Lamar +	4	–	1	–	0	5	–	6	–	0
SW Louisiana	2	–	2	–	1	5	–	4	–	1
Arkansas State	1	–	3	–	1	4	–	4	–	1
UT Arlington	1	–	4	–	0	2	–	9	–	0
Abilene Christian	0	–	4	–	0	5	–	5	–	0
$ – Conference champion; Rankings from AP small college poll

The 1971 Lamar Cardinals football team represented Lamar University as a member of the Southland Conference during the 1971 NCAA College Division football season. Led by ninth-year head coach Vernon Glass, the Cardinals compiled an overall record of 5–6 with a mark of 4–1 in conference play, sharing the Southland title with new conference member, Louisiana Tech, and the departing Trinity Tigers. Lamar played home games at Cardinal Stadium in Beaumont, Texas.

The 1971 season marked the first year the Cardinals competed as the Lamar University Cardinals following the school's name change from Lamar State College of Technology to Lamar University on August 23, 1971.

== Schedule ==
Date	Time	Opponent	Site	Result	Attendance	Source
September 11		Sam Houston State*	Cardinal Stadium; Beaumont, TX	L 12–13	13,220	
September 18	8:00 p.m.	at West Texas State*	Kimbrough Memorial Stadium; Canyon, TX	L 6–14	10,200	
September 25		at No. T–9 Louisiana Tech	Louisiana Tech Stadium; Ruston, LA	L 7–26	13,800	
October 2		Central Missouri State*	Cardinal Stadium; Beaumont, TX	W 35–6	12,222	
October 9		at No. 10 McNeese State*	Cowboy Stadium; Lake Charles, LA (Battle of the Border)	L 0–38	13,000	
October 16		at Mississippi State*	Scott Field; Starkville, MS	L 7–24	18,000	
October 23		Southwestern Louisiana	Cardinal Stadium; Beaumont, TX (rivalry)	L 20–21	10,200	
October 30		at Abilene Christian	Shotwell Stadium; Abilene, TX	W 30–28	8,000	
November 6		Trinity (TX)	Cardinal Stadium; Beaumont, TX	W 27–15	10,500	
November 20	2:00 p.m.	at UT Arlington	Turnpike Stadium; Arlington, TX	W 23–14	3,800	
November 27		Arkansas State	Cardinal Stadium; Beaumont, TX	W 24–13	11,000	
*Non-conference game; Rankings from AP Poll released prior to the game; All times are in Central time
