= 1971 Western Kentucky Hilltoppers football team =

American college football season

1971 Western Kentucky Hilltoppers football

OVC champion
- Conference: Ohio Valley Conference

Ranking
- Coaches: No. 12
- AP: No. 6
- Record: 8–2 (6–1 OVC)
- Head coach: Jimmy Feix (4th season)
- Home stadium: L. T. Smith Stadium

1971 Ohio Valley Conference football standings
	Conf.					Overall
Team	W		L		T	W		L		T
No. 6/12 Western Kentucky $	6	–	1	–	0	8	–	2	–	0
Tennessee Tech	5	–	2	–	0	8	–	2	–	0
Middle Tennessee	5	–	2	–	0	7	–	4	–	0
Morehead State	4	–	3	–	0	7	–	3	–	0
Murray State	3	–	3	–	1	5	–	4	–	1
Eastern Kentucky	3	–	4	–	0	5	–	6	–	0
Austin Peay	1	–	6	–	0	2	–	8	–	0
East Tennessee State	0	–	6	–	1	0	–	9	–	1
$ – Conference champion; Rankings from AP/UPI small college polls

The 1971 Western Kentucky football team represented Western Kentucky University during the 1971 NCAA College Division football season. The team was led by coach Jimmy Feix and won their second consecutive Ohio Valley Conference championship and the school's fourth overall. The coaching staff included future NFL coach Romeo Crennel. The Hilltoppers’ rankings in the final polls were UPI 12 and AP 6, and finished ranked 1st in Pass Defense in NCAA Division II. The team roster included future NFL players Virgil Livers, John Bushong, Clarence “Jazz” Jackson, and Mike McCoy. Jim Barber was named to the Universal Sports All-American team. The All OVC team included Barber, Terry Kokinda, Bob Morehead, Leo Peckenpaugh, Bill Sykes, and Terry Thompson.

== Schedule ==
Date	Opponent	Rank	Site	Result	Attendance	Source
September 18	Wittenberg*	No. 15 UPI	L. T. Smith Stadium; Bowling Green, KY	W 33–7	17,042	
September 25	at Austin Peay	No. 6	Municipal Stadium; Clarksville, TN	W 46–7	4,990	
October 2	East Tennessee State	No. 4	L. T. Smith Stadium; Bowling Green, KY	W 36–7	16,276	
October 9	at No. 6 Eastern Michigan*	No. 5	Rynearson Stadium; Ypsilanti, MI	L 14–17	12,200	
October 16	Tennessee Tech^{†}	No. 10	L. T. Smith Stadium; Bowling Green, KY	W 15–7	19,926	
October 23	at Eastern Kentucky	No. 10 UPI	Hanger Field; Richmond, KY (Battle of the Bluegrass)	W 16–7	24,500	
October 30	Morehead State	No. 9	L. T. Smith Stadium; Bowling Green, KY	W 34–11	15,762	
November 6	at Middle Tennessee	No. 6	Horace Jones Field; Murfreesboro, TN (rivalry)	L 13–27	6,500	
November 13	at Butler*	No. 7	Butler Bowl; Indianapolis, IN	W 31–0	7,450	
November 20	Murray State	No. 6	L. T. Smith Stadium; Bowling Green, KY (rivalry)	W 24–10	16,327	
*Non-conference game; ^{†}Homecoming; Rankings from AP Poll released prior to the game; Source:
