= 1971 Trinity Tigers football team =

American college football season

1971 Trinity Tigers football

Southland co-champion
- Conference: Southland Conference
- Record: 8–2 (4–1 Southland)
- Head coach: Gene Offield (2nd season)
- Home stadium: Alamo Stadium

1971 Southland Conference football standings
	Conf.					Overall
Team	W		L		T	W		L		T
No. 4 Louisiana Tech +	4	–	1	–	0	9	–	2	–	0
Trinity (TX) +	4	–	1	–	0	8	–	2	–	0
Lamar +	4	–	1	–	0	5	–	6	–	0
SW Louisiana	2	–	2	–	1	5	–	4	–	1
Arkansas State	1	–	3	–	1	4	–	4	–	1
UT Arlington	1	–	4	–	0	2	–	9	–	0
Abilene Christian	0	–	4	–	0	5	–	5	–	0
$ – Conference champion; Rankings from AP small college poll

The 1971 Trinity Tigers football team was an American football team that represented Trinity University in the Southland Conference during the 1971 NCAA College Division football season. In their second year under head coach Gene Offield, the team compiled a 8–2 record, and finished as Southland co-champion.

== Schedule ==
Date	Time	Opponent	Site	Result	Attendance	Source
September 18		Texas A&I*	Alamo Stadium; San Antonio, TX	W 16–10	8,630	
September 25	7:35 p.m.	at Wichita State*	Cessna Stadium; Wichita, KS	L 8–12	20,011	
October 2		at Southwestern Louisiana	Cajun Field; Lafayette, LA	W 27–21	15,000–16,000	
October 9		at Texas Lutheran*	Matador Field; Seguin, TX	W 27–24	2,500	
October 16		at Southeastern Louisiana*	Strawberry Stadium; Hammond, LA	W 24–17	3,500	
October 23		Northern Arizona*	Alamo Stadium; San Antonio, TX	W 42–21	3,071	
October 30		UT Arlington	Alamo Stadium; San Antonio, TX	W 28–7	3,481	
November 6		at Lamar	Cardinal Stadium; Beaumont, TX	L 15–27	10,500	
November 13		at Abilene Christian	Shotwell Stadium; Abilene, TX	W 27–14	11,000	
November 20		Arkansas State	Alamo Stadium; San Antonio, TX	W 28–11	3,086	
*Non-conference game; All times are in Central time
