= 1971 Southwestern Louisiana Bulldogs football team =

American college football season

1971 Southwestern Louisiana Bulldogs football
- Conference: Southland Conference
- Record: 5–4–1 (2–2–1 Southland)
- Head coach: Russ Faulkinberry (11th season)
- Home stadium: Cajun Field

1971 Southland Conference football standings
	Conf.					Overall
Team	W		L		T	W		L		T
No. 4 Louisiana Tech +	4	–	1	–	0	9	–	2	–	0
Trinity (TX) +	4	–	1	–	0	8	–	2	–	0
Lamar +	4	–	1	–	0	5	–	6	–	0
SW Louisiana	2	–	2	–	1	5	–	4	–	1
Arkansas State	1	–	3	–	1	4	–	4	–	1
UT Arlington	1	–	4	–	0	2	–	9	–	0
Abilene Christian	0	–	4	–	0	5	–	5	–	0
$ – Conference champion; Rankings from AP small college poll

The 1971 Southwestern Louisiana Bulldogs football team was an American football team that represented the University of Southwestern Louisiana (now known as the University of Louisiana at Lafayette) in the Southland Conference during the 1971 NCAA College Division football season. In their eleventh year under head coach Russ Faulkinberry, the team compiled an 5–4–1 record.

== Schedule ==
Date	Opponent	Site	Result	Attendance	Source
September 18	at Southeastern Louisiana*	Strawberry Stadium; Hammond, LA (Cypress Mug)	W 7–6	9,900	
September 25	Santa Clara*	Cajun Field; Lafayette, LA	W 21–0	21,000	
October 2	Trinity (TX)	Cajun Field; Lafayette, LA	L 21–27	15,000–16,000	
October 9	at Louisiana Tech	Louisiana Tech Stadium; Ruston, LA (rivalry)	L 15–35	15,400	
October 16	UT Arlington	Cajun Field; Lafayette, LA	W 16–0	10,000	
October 23	at Lamar	Cardinal Stadium; Beaumont, TX (Sabine Shoe)	W 21–20	10,200	
October 30	Northeast Louisiana*	Cajun Field; Lafayette, LA (rivalry)	W 31–7	23,700	
November 6	at Arkansas State	Kays Stadium; Jonesboro, AR	T 10–10	3,500	
November 13	Northwestern State*	Cajun Field; Lafayette, LA	L 19–27	15,300	
November 19	No. 2 McNeese State*	Cajun Field; Lafayette, LA (Cajun Crown)	L 10–20	25,000	
*Non-conference game; Rankings from AP Poll released prior to the game
