= 1971 Pioneer Bowl =

Louisiana Tech Bulldogs	Eastern Michigan Hurons
(8–2)	(7–0–2)
Southland Conference	Independent
14	3
Head coach: Maxie Lambright	Head coach: Dan Boisture
	1	2	3	4	Total
Louisiana Tech	7	0	7	0	14
Eastern Michigan	0	3	0	0	3
- Date: December 11, 1971
- Season: 1971
- Stadium: Memorial Stadium
- Location: Wichita Falls, Texas
- MVP: Ken Lantrip (QB, La. Tech); Fred Dean (DL, La. Tech)
- Attendance: 8,156

The 1971 Pioneer Bowl was a college football bowl game in Texas, played between the Louisiana Tech Bulldogs and Eastern Michigan Hurons at Memorial Stadium in Wichita Falls. The inaugural edition of the Pioneer Bowl, it was one of four regional finals in the College Division played on December 11.

== Game summary ==
=== Scoring summary ===
Scoring summary

Quarter	Time	Drive			Team	Scoring information	Score	
Quarter	Time	Plays	Yards	TOP	Team	Scoring information	La. Tech	EMU
1					La. Tech	Glen Berteau 17-yard touchdown reception from Ken Lantrip, Russell Bates kick good	7	0
2					EMU	22-yard field goal by Jackson Nunn	7	3
3					La. Tech	Wenford Wilborn 91-yard punt return, Russell Bates kick good	14	3
"TOP" = time of possession. For other American football terms, see Glossary of American football.							14	3

=== Statistics ===
	1	2	3	4	Total
Bulldogs	7	0	7	0	14
Hurons	0	3	0	0	3

Statistics	La. Tech	EMU
First downs	16	12
Total offense, yards	276	215
Rushes-yards (net)	41–106	48–178
Passing yards (net)	170	37
Passes, Comp-Att-Int	15–24–1	5–16–0
Time of Possession		

Team	Category	Player	Statistics
La. Tech	Passing	Ken Lantrip	15/24, 170 yds, 1 TD, 1 INT
La. Tech	Rushing	Glen Berteau	14 car, 31 yds
La. Tech	Receiving	Roger Carr	4 rec, 40 yds
EMU	Passing		
EMU	Rushing	Tim Packrall	31 car, 122 yds
EMU	Receiving		
