= 1971 UT Arlington Mavericks football team =

American college football season

1971 UT Arlington Mavericks football
- Conference: Southland Conference
- Record: 2–9 (1–4 Southland)
- Head coach: John Symank (1st season)
- Defensive coordinator: C. O. Brocato (1st season)
- Home stadium: Turnpike Stadium

1971 Southland Conference football standings
| | Conf. | | | | | Overall |
| Team | W | | L | | T | W | | L | | T |
|---|---|---|---|---|---|---|---|---|---|---|
| No. 4 Louisiana Tech + | 4 | – | 1 | – | 0 | 9 | – | 2 | – | 0 |
| Trinity (TX) + | 4 | – | 1 | – | 0 | 8 | – | 2 | – | 0 |
| Lamar + | 4 | – | 1 | – | 0 | 5 | – | 6 | – | 0 |
| SW Louisiana | 2 | – | 2 | – | 1 | 5 | – | 4 | – | 1 |
| Arkansas State | 1 | – | 3 | – | 1 | 4 | – | 4 | – | 1 |
| UT Arlington | 1 | – | 4 | – | 0 | 2 | – | 9 | – | 0 |
| Abilene Christian | 0 | – | 4 | – | 0 | 5 | – | 5 | – | 0 |
$ – Conference champion; Rankings from AP small college poll

The 1971 UT Arlington Mavericks football team was an American football team that represented the University of Texas at Arlington in the Southland Conference during the 1971 NCAA College Division football season. In their first year under head coach John Symank, the team compiled a 2–9 record.

In December 1970, former Arlington State back John Symank was hired as head coach from Northern Arizona. The 1971 season also marked the first UTA competed as the Mavericks after previously being known as the Rebels since 1951. The name Mavericks was selected by the student body over Toros and the name change was undertaken after the Rebels moniker became increasingly controversial due to its association with the Confederacy.

== Schedule ==
| Date | Time | Opponent | Site | Result | Attendance | Source |
|---|---|---|---|---|---|---|
| September 11 | 8:30 p.m. | at UTEP* | Sun Bowl; El Paso, TX | L 9–38 | 17,212 | |
| September 18 | 7:30 p.m. | at TCU* | Amon G. Carter Stadium; Fort Worth, TX | L 0–42 | 20,868 | |
| September 25 | 7:32 p.m. | No. 19 Toledo* | Turnpike Stadium; Arlington, TX | L 0–23 | 8,500 | |
| October 9 | 8:00 p.m. | at West Texas State* | Kimbrough Memorial Stadium; Canyon, TX | W 13–0 | 10,000 | |
| October 17 | | at Southwestern Louisiana | Cajun Field; Lafayette, LA | L 16–0 | 8,000 | |
| October 23 | 7:30 p.m. | New Mexico State* | Turnpike Stadium; Arlington, TX | L 6–20 | 8,500 | |
| October 30 | | at Trinity (TX) | Alamo Stadium; San Antonio, TX | L 7–28 | 3,481 | |
| November 6 | 7:30 p.m. | Bowling Green* | Turnpike Stadium; Arlington, TX | L 17–34 | 1,000 | |
| November 13 | | at Arkansas State | Kays Stadium; Jonesboro, AR | L 7–28 | 10,100 | |
| November 20 | 2:00 p.m. | Lamar | Turnpike Stadium; Arlington, TX | L 14–23 | 3,800 | |
| November 27 | 2:00 p.m. | Abilene Christian | Turnpike Stadium; Arlington, TX | W 21–17 | 2,200–2,500 | |
*Non-conference game; Rankings from AP Poll released prior to the game; All times are in Central time
