= 1970 East Tennessee State Buccaneers football team =

American college football season

1970 East Tennessee State Buccaneers football
- Conference: Ohio Valley Conference
- Record: 7–1–2 (4–1–2 OVC)
- Head coach: John Robert Bell (5th season)
- Home stadium: Memorial Stadium

1970 Ohio Valley Conference football standings
	Conf.					Overall
Team	W		L		T	W		L		T
No. 12/9 Western Kentucky $	5	–	1	–	1	8	–	1	–	1
Eastern Kentucky	5	–	2	–	0	8	–	2	–	0
East Tennessee State	4	–	1	–	2	7	–	1	–	2
Morehead State	4	–	3	–	0	6	–	4	–	0
Middle Tennessee	3	–	3	–	1	6	–	3	–	1
Austin Peay	2	–	5	–	0	3	–	7	–	0
Tennessee Tech	2	–	5	–	0	4	–	6	–	0
Murray State	1	–	6	–	0	4	–	6	–	0
$ – Conference champion; Rankings from AP/UPI small college polls

The 1970 East Tennessee State Buccaneers football team represented East Tennessee State University as a member of the Ohio Valley Conference (OVC) during the 1970 NCAA College Division football season. Led by fifth-year head coach John Robert Bell, the Buccaneers compiled an overall record of 7–1–2, with a mark of 4–1–2 in conference play, and finished tied for second in the OVC.

== Schedule ==
Date	Opponent	Rank	Site	Result	Attendance	Source
September 19	at East Carolina*		Ficklen Memorial Stadium; Greenville, NC	W 10–0	13,042	
September 26	at Eastern Kentucky	No. 14	Hanger Field; Richmond, KY	L 6–10	14,500	
October 3	No. 11 Western Kentucky		Memorial Stadium; Johnson City, TN	T 10–10	9,500	
October 10	Tennessee Tech		Memorial Stadium; Johnson City, TN	W 30–7	9,000	
October 17	Chattanooga*		Memorial Stadium; Johnson City, TN	W 21–17	10,102	
October 24	at Murray State		Cutchin Stadium; Murray, KY	W 14–6	10,000	
October 31	at Appalachian State*		Conrad Stadium; Boone, NC	W 9–7	5,000	
November 7	Morehead State		Memorial Stadium; Johnson City, TN	W 13–7	5,500	
November 14	at Middle Tennessee		Horace Jones Field; Murfreesboro, TN	T 3–3	2,500	
November 21	Austin Peay		Memorial Stadium; Johnson City, TN	W 45–14	4,572	
*Non-conference game; Rankings from AP Poll released prior to the game; Source:
