= 1971 Texas Southern Tigers football team =

American college football season

1971 Texas Southern Tigers football
- Conference: Southwestern Athletic Conference
- Record: 7–2–1 (3–2–1 SWAC)
- Head coach: Rod Paige (1st season)
- Home stadium: Astrodome; Jeppesen Stadium; Rice Stadium

1971 Southwestern Athletic Conference football standings
	Conf.					Overall
Team	W		L		T	W		L		T
No. 9 Grambling $	5	–	1	–	0	9	–	2	–	0
Jackson State	4	–	1	–	1	9	–	1	–	1
No. 16 Alcorn A&M	4	–	2	–	0	6	–	3	–	0
Texas Southern	3	–	2	–	1	7	–	2	–	1
Prairie View A&M	2	–	4	–	0	3	–	7	–	0
Mississippi Valley State	1	–	5	–	0	4	–	7	–	0
Southern	1	–	5	–	0	3	–	7	–	0
$ – Conference champion; Rankings from NAIA Division I poll for Grambling and UPI small college poll for Alcorn A&M

The 1971 Texas Southern Tigers football team was an American football team that represented Texas Southern University as a member of the Southwestern Athletic Conference (SWAC) during the 1971 NCAA College Division football season. Led by first-year head coach Rod Paige, the Tigers compiled an overall record of 7–2–1, with a mark of 3–2–1 in conference play, and finished fourth in the SWAC.

The October 15 game against Bishop was the first football game ever played at Texas Stadium.

== Schedule ==
Date	Opponent	Site	Result	Attendance	Source
September 18	at Southern	A. W. Mumford Stadium; Baton Rouge, LA	W 21–0		
September 25	at New Mexico Highlands*	Las Vegas, NM	W 33–18		
October 2	No. 10 Tennessee State*	Rice Stadium; Houston, TX	W 28–23		
October 9	Alcorn A&M	Rice Stadium; Houston, TX	L 7–10		
October 15	at Bishop*	Texas Stadium; Irving, TX	W 34–21		
October 23	at Mississippi Valley State	Magnolia Stadium; Itta Bena, MS	W 23–0		
October 30	Grambling	Astrodome; Houston, TX	L 7–21	33,000–33,556	
November 6	Jackson State	Jeppesen Stadium; Houston, TX	T 7–7		
November 13	Langston*	Jeppesen Stadium; Houston, TX	L 37–28		
November 25	Prairie View A&M	Astrodome; Houston, TX (rivalry)	W 16–6		
*Non-conference game; Rankings from AP Poll released prior to the game
