= 1971 Morgan State Bears football team =

American college football season

1971 Morgan State Bears football

MEAC champion
- Conference: Mid-Eastern Athletic Conference
- Record: 6–4–1 (5–0–1 MEAC)
- Head coach: Earl Banks (12th season)
- Home stadium: Hughes Stadium

1971 Mid-Eastern Athletic Conference football standings
	Conf.					Overall
Team	W		L		T	W		L		T
Morgan State $	5	–	0	–	1	6	–	4	–	1
North Carolina Central	5	–	1	–	0	7	–	2	–	0
South Carolina State	3	–	2	–	1	6	–	3	–	1
North Carolina A&T	3	–	2	–	1	6	–	4	–	1
Maryland Eastern Shore	1	–	4	–	1	1	–	5	–	2
Howard	1	–	5	–	0	4	–	5	–	0
Delaware State	1	–	5	–	0	1	–	8	–	0
$ – Conference champion

The 1971 Morgan State Bears football team represented Morgan State College (now known as Morgan State University) as a member of the Mid-Eastern Athletic Conference (MEAC) during the 1971 NCAA College Division football season. Led by 12th-year head coach Earl Banks, the Bears compiled an overall record of 6–4–1 and a mark of 5–0–1 in conference play, and finished as MEAC champion.

== Schedule ==
Date	Opponent	Site	Result	Attendance	Source
September 11	vs. Grambling*	Yankee Stadium; Bronx, NY (Whitney Young Memorial Classic)	L 13–31	65,005	
September 18	Norfolk State*	Hughes Stadium; Baltimore, MD	W 33–9	5,000	
October 2	at North Carolina Central	O'Kelly Field; Durham, NC	W 23–8	7,000	
October 9	Maryland Eastern Shore	Hughes Stadium; Baltimore, MD	T 13–13	7,500	
October 16	at South Carolina State	State College Stadium; Orangeburg, SC	W 21–0	7,000–8,000	
October 23	at Delaware State	Alumni Stadium; Dover, DE	W 33–7	3,000	
October 30	North Carolina A&T^{†}	Hughes Stadium; Baltimore, MD	W 21–20	11,814–12,156	
November 5	at Howard	RFK Stadium; Washington, DC (rivalry)	W 7–0	9,358	
November 13	at Jackson State*	Mississippi Veterans Memorial Stadium; Jackson, MS	L 29–34	6,573	
November 20	Virginia State*	Hughes Stadium; Baltimore, MD	L 12–14	4,000	
November 27	at Rutgers*	Rutgers Stadium; Piscataway, NJ (Urban Classic)	L 8–27	9,000–10,000	
*Non-conference game; ^{†}Homecoming
