= 1971 Southern Jaguars football team =

American college football season

1971 Southern Jaguars football
- Conference: Southwestern Athletic Conference
- Record: 3–7 (1–5 SWAC)
- Head coach: Alva Tabor (3rd season)
- Home stadium: University Stadium

1971 Southwestern Athletic Conference football standings
	Conf.					Overall
Team	W		L		T	W		L		T
No. 9 Grambling $	5	–	1	–	0	9	–	2	–	0
Jackson State	4	–	1	–	1	9	–	1	–	1
No. 16 Alcorn A&M	4	–	2	–	0	6	–	3	–	0
Texas Southern	3	–	2	–	1	7	–	2	–	1
Prairie View A&M	2	–	4	–	0	3	–	7	–	0
Mississippi Valley State	1	–	5	–	0	4	–	7	–	0
Southern	1	–	5	–	0	3	–	7	–	0
$ – Conference champion; Rankings from NAIA Division I poll for Grambling and UPI small college poll for Alcorn A&M

The 1971 Southern Jaguars football team represented Southern University as a member of the Southwestern Athletic Conference (SWAC) during the 1971 NCAA College Division football season. Led by third-year head coach Alva Tabor, the Jaguars compiled an overall record of 3–7, with a conference record of 1–5, and finished tied for sixth in the SWAC.

== Schedule ==
Date	Opponent	Site	Result	Attendance	Source
September 18	Texas Southern	University Stadium; Baton Rouge, LA	L 0–21	18,023	
September 25	at Prairie View A&M	Astrodome; Houston, TX	L 3–21	17,747	
October 2	Mississippi Valley State	University Stadium; Baton Rouge, LA	W 14–0	15,009	
October 9	Arkansas AM&N*^{†}	University Stadium; Baton Rouge, LA	L 27–28	23,103	
October 16	at Jackson State	Mississippi Veterans Memorial Stadium; Jackson, MS (rivalry)	L 28–49	13,000	
October 23	Alcorn A&M	University Stadium; Baton Rouge, LA	L 14–30	13,363	
October 30	No. 7 Tennessee State*	University Stadium; Baton Rouge, LA	L 16–27	19,451	
November 13	at Florida A&M*	Bragg Memorial Stadium; Tallahassee, FL	W 13–9	11,903	
November 20	at Grambling	Grambling Stadium; Grambling, LA (rivalry)	L 3–31	33,897–33,981	
November 27	North Carolina A&T*	University Stadium; Baton Rouge, LA	W 24–16	3,871–5,691	
*Non-conference game; ^{†}Homecoming; Rankings from AP Poll released prior to the game
