= Jim Hillyer (American football) =

American football player and coach (1928–1991)

Biographical details
- Born: March 23, 1928
- Died: February 19, 1991 (aged 62)

Playing career
- c. 1950: Samuel Huston
- Position: Fullback

Coaching career (HC unless noted)
- 1962–1967: Dunbar HS (TX)
- 1968–1969: Colorado State (offensive ends)
- 1970: Prairie View A&M (assistant)
- 1971: Prairie View A&M

Head coaching record
- Overall: 3–7 (college); 51–6–5 (high school)

James Hillyer (March 23, 1928 – February 19, 1991) was an American football coach. He was the 11th head football coach at Prairie View A&M University in Prairie View, Texas and he held that position for the 1971 season. His record at Prairie View was 3–7.

Hillyer attended Solomon Coles High School in Corpus Christi, Texas, where he starred in football and basketball. He played college football as a fullback at Samuel Huston College—now known as Huston–Tillotson University. Hillyer was the head football coach at Dunbar High School in Lubbock, Texas for seven seasons, compiling a record of 51–6–5. He was hired in 1970 as an assistant coach as Prairie View A&M.

== Head coaching record ==
=== College ===
Year	Team	Overall	Conference	Standing	Bowl/playoffs
Prairie View A&M Panthers (Southwestern Athletic Conference) (1971)
1971	Prairie View A&M	3–7	2–4	5th	
Prairie View A&M:		3–7	2–4		
Total:		3–7			
