= 1970 Middle Tennessee Blue Raiders football team =

American college football season

1970 Middle Tennessee Blue Raiders football
- Conference: Ohio Valley Conference
- Record: 6–3–1 (3–3–1 OVC)
- Head coach: Bill Peck (1st season)
- Captains: D. Duvall; T. Edwards
- Home stadium: Horace Jones Field

1970 Ohio Valley Conference football standings
	Conf.					Overall
Team	W		L		T	W		L		T
No. 12/9 Western Kentucky $	5	–	1	–	1	8	–	1	–	1
Eastern Kentucky	5	–	2	–	0	8	–	2	–	0
East Tennessee State	4	–	1	–	2	7	–	1	–	2
Morehead State	4	–	3	–	0	6	–	4	–	0
Middle Tennessee	3	–	3	–	1	6	–	3	–	1
Austin Peay	2	–	5	–	0	3	–	7	–	0
Tennessee Tech	2	–	5	–	0	4	–	6	–	0
Murray State	1	–	6	–	0	4	–	6	–	0
$ – Conference champion; Rankings from AP/UPI small college polls

The 1970 Middle Tennessee Blue Raiders football team represented Middle Tennessee State University—as a member of the Ohio Valley Conference (OVC) during the 1970 NCAA College Division football season. Led by first-year head coach Bill Peck, the Blue Raiders compiled a record an overall record of 6–3–1 with a mark of 3–3–1 in conference play, placing fifth in the OVC. The team's captains were D. Duvall and T. Edwards.

== Schedule ==
Date	Opponent	Site	Result	Attendance	Source
September 19	Tennessee–Martin*	Horace Jones Field; Murfreesboro, TN	W 28–7	6,500	
September 26	Morehead State	Horace Jones Field; Murfreesboro, TN	W 14–6	6,000	
October 3	at Chattanooga*	Chamberlain Field; Chattanooga, TN	W 24–8	7,689	
October 10	at Eastern Kentucky	Hanger Field; Richmond, KY	L 10–24	16,000	
October 17	at Murray State	Cutchin Stadium; Murray, KY	L 0–20	7,500	
October 24	Austin Peay	Horace Jones Field; Murfreesboro, TN	W 44–0	5,200	
October 31	Ball State*	Horace Jones Field; Murfreesboro, TN	W 14–7	4,800–5,000	
November 7	at No. 5 Western Kentucky	L. T. Smith Stadium; Bowling Green, KY (rivalry)	W 17–13	11,512–11,517	
November 14	East Tennessee State	Horace Jones Field; Murfreesboro, TN	T 3–3	2,500	
November 26	at Tennessee Tech	Tucker Stadium; Cookeville, TN	L 13–17	6,000	
*Non-conference game; Rankings from AP Poll released prior to the game
