= 1971 North Carolina Central Eagles football team =

American college football season

1971 North Carolina Central Eagles football
- Conference: Mid-Eastern Athletic Conference
- Record: 7–2 (5–1 MEAC)
- Head coach: George Quiett (4th season)
- Home stadium: Durham County Memorial Stadium; O'Kelly Field

1971 Mid-Eastern Athletic Conference football standings
	Conf.					Overall
Team	W		L		T	W		L		T
Morgan State $	5	–	0	–	1	6	–	4	–	1
North Carolina Central	5	–	1	–	0	7	–	2	–	0
South Carolina State	3	–	2	–	1	6	–	3	–	1
North Carolina A&T	3	–	2	–	1	6	–	4	–	1
Maryland Eastern Shore	1	–	4	–	1	1	–	5	–	2
Howard	1	–	5	–	0	4	–	5	–	0
Delaware State	1	–	5	–	0	1	–	8	–	0
$ – Conference champion

The 1971 North Carolina Central Eagles football team represented North Carolina Central University as a member of the Mid-Eastern Athletic Conference (MEAC) during the 1971 NCAA College Division football season. Led by fourth-year head coach George Quiett, the Eagles compiled an overall record of 7–2, with a mark of 5–1 in conference play, and finished second in the MEAC.

== Schedule ==
Date	Opponent	Site	Result	Attendance	Source
September 18	Elon*	Durham County Memorial Stadium; Durham, NC	W 14–7	5,000	
September 25	at Livingstone*	Ludwig Stadium; Salisbury, NC	W 19–10	750	
October 2	Morgan State	O'Kelly Field; Durham, NC	L 8–23	7,000	
October 16	Delaware State	O'Kelly Field; Durham, NC	W 34–3	1,009	
October 23	at Maryland Eastern Shore	Princess Anne, MD	W 7–0	100	
October 30	South Carolina State	O'Kelly Field; Durham, NC	W 21–12	3,250	
November 6	at Johnson C. Smith*	American Legion Memorial Stadium; Charlotte, NC	L 14–18	5,000	
November 13	Howard	O'Kelly Field; Durham, NC	W 42–18	3,000–7000	
November 20	at North Carolina A&T	World War Memorial Stadium; Greensboro, NC (rivalry)	W 14–13	6,005	
*Non-conference game
