= 1971 Alcorn A&M Braves football team =

American college football season

1971 Alcorn A&M Braves football
- Conference: Southwestern Athletic Conference
- Record: 6–3 (4–2 SWAC)
- Head coach: Marino Casem (8th season)
- Home stadium: Henderson Stadium

1971 Southwestern Athletic Conference football standings
	Conf.					Overall
Team	W		L		T	W		L		T
No. 9 Grambling $	5	–	1	–	0	9	–	2	–	0
Jackson State	4	–	1	–	1	9	–	1	–	1
No. 16 Alcorn A&M	4	–	2	–	0	6	–	3	–	0
Texas Southern	3	–	2	–	1	7	–	2	–	1
Prairie View A&M	2	–	4	–	0	3	–	7	–	0
Mississippi Valley State	1	–	5	–	0	4	–	7	–	0
Southern	1	–	5	–	0	3	–	7	–	0
$ – Conference champion; Rankings from NAIA Division I poll for Grambling and UPI small college poll for Alcorn A&M

The 1971 Alcorn A&M Braves football team represented Alcorn A&M College (now known as Alcorn State University) as a member of the Southwestern Athletic Conference (SWAC) during the 1971 NCAA College Division football season. Led by eighth-year head coach Marino Casem, the Braves compiled an overall record of 6–3, with a conference record of 4–2, and finished third in the SWAC.

== Schedule ==
Date	Opponent	Site	Result	Attendance	Source
September 17	vs. Grambling	Soldier Field; Chicago, IL (Urban League Classic)	L 6–21	33,000–39,710	
September 25	vs. Tennessee State*	Memphis Memorial Stadium; Memphis, TN	L 7–18	17,006	
October 9	at Texas Southern	Rice Stadium; Houston, TX	W 10–7		
October 16	Lincoln (MO)*	Henderson Stadium; Lorman, MS	W 55–13		
October 23	at Southern	University Stadium; Baton Rouge, LA	W 30–14		
October 31	Bishop*	Henderson Stadium; Lorman, MS	W 49–11		
November 6	Mississippi Valley State	Henderson Stadium; Lorman, MS	W 28–9		
November 13	vs. Prairie View A&M	City Park Stadium; Vicksburg, MS	W 33–13		
November 25	at Jackson State	Mississippi Veterans Memorial Stadium; Jackson, MS (rivalry)	L 29–35		
*Non-conference game
