= 1971 Grambling Tigers football team =

American college football season

1971 Grambling Tigers football

SWAC champion
- Conference: Southwestern Athletic Conference
- Record: 9–2 (5–1 SWAC)
- Head coach: Eddie Robinson (29th season)
- Home stadium: Grambling Stadium

1971 Southwestern Athletic Conference football standings
	Conf.					Overall
Team	W		L		T	W		L		T
No. 9 Grambling $	5	–	1	–	0	9	–	2	–	0
Jackson State	4	–	1	–	1	9	–	1	–	1
No. 16 Alcorn A&M	4	–	2	–	0	6	–	3	–	0
Texas Southern	3	–	2	–	1	7	–	2	–	1
Prairie View A&M	2	–	4	–	0	3	–	7	–	0
Mississippi Valley State	1	–	5	–	0	4	–	7	–	0
Southern	1	–	5	–	0	3	–	7	–	0
$ – Conference champion; Rankings from NAIA Division I poll for Grambling and UPI small college poll for Alcorn A&M

The 1971 Grambling Tigers football team represented Grambling College (now known as Grambling State University) as a member of the Southwestern Athletic Conference (SWAC) during the 1971 NCAA College Division football season. Led by 29th-year head coach Eddie Robinson, the Tigers compiled an overall record of 9–2 and a mark of 5–1 in conference play, and finished as SWAC co-champion.

== Schedule ==
Date	Opponent	Rank	Site	Result	Attendance	Source
September 11	vs. Morgan State*		Yankee Stadium; Bronx, NY (Whitney Young Memorial Classic)	W 31–13	65,005	
September 17	vs. Alcorn A&M		Soldier Field; Chicago, IL	W 21–6	33,000–39,710	
September 25	at Arkansas AM&N*	No. 3	War Memorial Stadium; Little Rock, AR	W 20–16	27,000	
October 2	Prairie View A&M	No. 3	Grambling Stadium; Grambling, LA (rivalry)	W 30–7	15,175	
October 9	at Tennessee State*	No. 3	Hale Stadium; Nashville, TN	L 35–41	18,000–25,000	
October 16	Mississippi Valley State	No. 7	Grambling Stadium; Grambling, LA	W 25–15	15,745–16,000	
October 23	at Jackson State		Mississippi Veterans Memorial Stadium; Jackson, MS	L 7–13	20,000–26,000	
October 30	at Texas Southern		Houston Astrodome; Houston, TX	W 21–7	33,000–33,556	
November 13	at Norfolk State*		Foreman Field; Norfolk, VA	W 55–0	21,000	
November 20	Southern		Grambling Stadium; Grambling, LA (rivalry)	W 31–3	33,897–33,981	
November 27	at Cal State Fullerton*		Los Angeles Memorial Coliseum; Los Angeles, CA	W 59–26	60,415	
*Non-conference game; Rankings from AP Poll released prior to the game
