= 1971 Arkansas State Indians football team =

American college football season

1971 Arkansas State Indians football
- Conference: Southland Conference
- Record: 4–4–1 (1–3–1 Southland)
- Head coach: Bill Davidson (1st season)
- Home stadium: Kays Stadium; War Memorial Stadium

1971 Southland Conference football standings
	Conf.					Overall
Team	W		L		T	W		L		T
No. 4 Louisiana Tech +	4	–	1	–	0	9	–	2	–	0
Trinity (TX) +	4	–	1	–	0	8	–	2	–	0
Lamar +	4	–	1	–	0	5	–	6	–	0
SW Louisiana	2	–	2	–	1	5	–	4	–	1
Arkansas State	1	–	3	–	1	4	–	4	–	1
UT Arlington	1	–	4	–	0	2	–	9	–	0
Abilene Christian	0	–	4	–	0	5	–	5	–	0
$ – Conference champion; Rankings from AP small college poll

The 1971 Arkansas State Indians football team represented Arkansas State University as a member of the Southland Conference during the 1971 NCAA College Division football season. Led by first-year head coach Bill Davidson, the Indians compiled an overall record of 4–4–1 with a mark of 1–3–1 in conference play, placing fifth in the Southland.

== Schedule ==
Date	Time	Opponent	Rank	Site	Result	Attendance	Source
September 18	7:35 p.m.	at Wichita State*		Cessna Stadium; Wichita, KS	W 16–14	13,250	
September 25		Northeast Louisiana*	No. 2	Kays Stadium; Jonesboro, AR	W 20–6	10,450–10,452	
October 9		at Southern Illinois*	No. 2	McAndrew Stadium; Carbondale, IL	L 14–21	10,200	
October 16		at Louisiana Tech	No. 6	Louisiana Tech Stadium; Ruston, LA	L 27–28	14,600	
October 23		Abilene Christian		War Memorial Stadium; Little Rock, AR	W 35–9	8,000	
November 6		Southwestern Louisiana		Kays Stadium; Jonesboro, AR	T 10–10	3,500	
November 13		UT Arlington^{†}		Kays Stadium; Jonesboro, AR	W 28–7	10,100	
November 20		at Trinity (TX)		Alamo Stadium; San Antonio, TX	L 11–28	3,086	
November 27		at Lamar		Cardinal Stadium; Beaumont, TX	L 13–24	11,000	
*Non-conference game; ^{†}Homecoming; Rankings from AP Poll released prior to the game; All times are in Central time
