= 1971 Howard Bison football team =

American college football season

1971 Howard Bison football
- Conference: Mid-Eastern Athletic Conference
- Record: 4–5 (1–5 MEAC)
- Head coach: Tillman Sease (9th season)
- Home stadium: Howard Stadium; RFK Stadium

1971 Mid-Eastern Athletic Conference football standings
	Conf.					Overall
Team	W		L		T	W		L		T
Morgan State $	5	–	0	–	1	6	–	4	–	1
North Carolina Central	5	–	1	–	0	7	–	2	–	0
South Carolina State	3	–	2	–	1	6	–	3	–	1
North Carolina A&T	3	–	2	–	1	6	–	4	–	1
Maryland Eastern Shore	1	–	4	–	1	1	–	5	–	2
Howard	1	–	5	–	0	4	–	5	–	0
Delaware State	1	–	5	–	0	1	–	8	–	0
$ – Conference champion

The 1971 Howard Bison football team represented Howard University as a member of the Mid-Eastern Athletic Conference (MEAC) during the 1971 NCAA College Division football season. Led by ninth-year head coach Tillman Sease, the Hawks compiled an overall record of 4–5, with a mark of 1–5 in conference play, and finished sixth in the MEAC.

== Schedule ==
Date	Opponent	Site	Result	Attendance	Source
September 18	vs. Maryland Eastern Shore	Harvard Stadium; Boston, MA	L 7–20	6,000	
September 25	at South Carolina State	State College Stadium; Orangeburg, SC	L 0–10	4,500–10,000	
October 2	Virginia State*	Howard Stadium; Washington, DC	W 21–14	7,852	
October 9	at Delaware State	Alumni Stadium; Dover, DE	W 29–3	3,000	
October 16	West Virginia State*^{†}	Howard Stadium; Washington, DC	W 41–6	9,246	
October 23	at North Carolina A&T	World War Memorial Stadium; Greensboro, NC	L 3–13	1,103	
October 30	Hampton*	Howard Stadium; Washington, DC	W 35–0	3,756	
November 5	Morgan State	RFK Stadium; Washington, DC (rivalry)	L 0–7	9,358	
November 13	at North Carolina Central	O'Kelly Field; Durham, NC	L 18–42	3,000–7,000	
*Non-conference game; ^{†}Homecoming
