= Willie Smith (American football coach) =

American football and basketball coach (1931–2016)

Biographical details
- Born: November 30, 1931; Portsmouth, Virginia, U.S.
- Died: August 22, 2016 (aged 84)

Coaching career (HC unless noted)

Football
- 1960s: Hampton (assistant)
- 1967: Norfolk State
- 1968–1970: Maryland State / Maryland Eastern Shore (assistant)
- 1971–1972: Maryland Eastern Shore
- 1973–1977: North Carolina Central

Basketball
- 1961–1962: Hampton

Track
- c. 1960: Hampton (assistant)

Head coaching record
- Overall: 35–35–5 (football); 7–16 (basketball)

Accomplishments and honors

Championships
- Football; 1 MEAC (1973)

Willie Sherrod Smith Jr. (November 30, 1931 – August 22, 2016) was an American football and basketball coach. He served as the head football coach at Norfolk State College—now known as Norfolk State University—in 1967, the University of Maryland Eastern Shore from 1971 to 1972, and North Carolina Central University from 1973 until midway through the 1977 season, compiling a career college football coaching record of 35–35–5. Smith was also the head basketball coach at Hampton University for one season, in 1961–62, tallying a mark of 7–16. Smith died on August 22, 2016, at the age of 84.

== Head coaching record ==
=== Football ===
Year	Team	Overall	Conference	Standing	Bowl/playoffs
Norfolk State Spartans (Central Intercollegiate Athletic Association) (1967)
1967	Norfolk State	4–4	3–4	8th	
Norfolk State:		4–4	3–4		
Maryland Eastern Shore Hawks (Mid-Eastern Athletic Conference) (1971–1972)
1971	Maryland Eastern Shore	1–5–2	1–4–1	5th	
1972	Maryland Eastern Shore	4–5	4–2	T–2nd	
Maryland Eastern Shore:		5–10–2	5–6–1		
North Carolina Central Eagles (Central Intercollegiate Athletic Association) (1973–1977)
1973	North Carolina Central	7–4	5–1	1st	
1974	North Carolina Central	7–2–2	4–1–1	T–2nd	
1975	North Carolina Central	5–4–1	3–2–1	4th	
1976	North Carolina Central	6–5	2–4	5th	
1977	North Carolina Central	1–6 (Note: Smith was North Carolina Central's head coach for the first seven games of the 1977 season before resigning. Clements and Robert Jackson served as co-interim head coaches for the final four games. North Carolina Central finished the year 1–10 overall and 0–6 in Mid-Eastern Athletic Conference (MEAC) play.)	0–3		
North Carolina Central:		26–21–3	14–11–2		
Total:		35–35–5			
