= 1970 Western Kentucky Hilltoppers football team =

American college football season

1970 Western Kentucky Hilltoppers football

OVC champion
- Conference: Ohio Valley Conference

Ranking
- Coaches: No. 9
- AP: No. 12
- Record: 8–1–1 (5–1–1 OVC)
- Head coach: Jimmy Feix (3rd season)
- Home stadium: L. T. Smith Stadium

1970 Ohio Valley Conference football standings
	Conf.					Overall
Team	W		L		T	W		L		T
No. 12/9 Western Kentucky $	5	–	1	–	1	8	–	1	–	1
Eastern Kentucky	5	–	2	–	0	8	–	2	–	0
East Tennessee State	4	–	1	–	2	7	–	1	–	2
Morehead State	4	–	3	–	0	6	–	4	–	0
Middle Tennessee	3	–	3	–	1	6	–	3	–	1
Austin Peay	2	–	5	–	0	3	–	7	–	0
Tennessee Tech	2	–	5	–	0	4	–	6	–	0
Murray State	1	–	6	–	0	4	–	6	–	0
$ – Conference champion; Rankings from AP/UPI small college polls

The 1970 Western Kentucky football team represented Western Kentucky University during the 1970 NCAA College Division football season. The team was led by coach Jimmy Feix and won the Ohio Valley Conference championship after coming in second the previous three years. The coaching staff included future NFL coach Romeo Crennel. The Hilltoppers’ finished the season ranked No. 12 in the AP and No. 9 in the UPI final polls.

The team roster included future National Football League (NFL) players Lawrence Brame, Bill "Jelly" Green, Clarence "Jazz" Jackson, Brad Watson, and Mike McCoy. Brame was named to the AP All-American team as well as being the OVC Defensive Player Of The Year for the second consecutive year. The All-OVC team included Jim Barber, Brame, Jay Davis, Dennis Durso, Green, and Steve Wilson.

== Schedule ==
Date	Opponent	Rank	Site	Result	Attendance	Source
September 19	at Indiana State*		Memorial Stadium; Terre Haute, IN	W 30–6	13,500	
September 26	Austin Peay	No. 12	L. T. Smith Stadium; Bowling Green, KY	W 28–9	11,450	
October 3	at No. 14 East Tennessee State	No. 11	Memorial Stadium; Johnson City, TN	T 10–10	8,000	
October 10	No. 7 Eastern Michigan*^{†}	No. 10	L. T. Smith Stadium; Bowling Green, KY	W 45–6	19,250	
October 17	at Tennessee Tech	No. 8	Tucker Stadium; Cookeville, TN	W 28–0	10,100	
October 24	No. 14 Eastern Kentucky	No. 8	L. T. Smith Stadium; Bowling Green, KY (Battle of the Bluegrass)	W 19–7	17,511	
October 31	at Morehead State	No. 6	Jayne Stadium; Morehead, KY	W 24–14	8,500	
November 7	Middle Tennessee	No. 5	L. T. Smith Stadium; Bowling Green, KY (100 Miles of Hate)	L 13–17	11,512–11,517	
November 14	Butler*	No. 12	L. T. Smith Stadium; Bowling Green, KY	W 14–0	5,026	
November 21	at Murray State	No. 13	Cutchin Stadium; Murray, KY (rivalry)	W 33–7	7,500	
*Non-conference game; ^{†}Homecoming; Rankings from AP Poll released prior to the game
