= 1971 Mississippi Valley State Delta Devils football team =

American college football season

1971 Mississippi Valley State Delta Devils football
- Conference: Southwestern Athletic Conference
- Record: 4–7 (1–5 SWAC)
- Head coach: Davis Weathersby (2nd season)
- Home stadium: Magnolia Stadium; Charles Kerg Field

1971 Southwestern Athletic Conference football standings
	Conf.					Overall
Team	W		L		T	W		L		T
No. 9 Grambling $	5	–	1	–	0	9	–	2	–	0
Jackson State	4	–	1	–	1	9	–	1	–	1
No. 16 Alcorn A&M	4	–	2	–	0	6	–	3	–	0
Texas Southern	3	–	2	–	1	7	–	2	–	1
Prairie View A&M	2	–	4	–	0	3	–	7	–	0
Mississippi Valley State	1	–	5	–	0	4	–	7	–	0
Southern	1	–	5	–	0	3	–	7	–	0
$ – Conference champion; Rankings from NAIA Division I poll for Grambling and UPI small college poll for Alcorn A&M

The 1971 Mississippi Valley State Delta Devils football team represented Mississippi Valley State College (now known as Mississippi Valley State University) as a member of the Southwestern Athletic Conference (SWAC) during the 1971 NCAA College Division football season. Led by second-year head coach Davis Weathersby, the Delta Devils compiled an overall record of 4–7, with a conference record of 1–5, and finished tied for sixth in the SWAC.

== Schedule ==
Date	Opponent	Site	Result	Attendance	Source
September 11	at Alabama A&M*	Milton Frank Stadium; Huntsville, AL	W 8–7		
September 18	Arkansas AM&N*	Magnolia Stadium; Itta Bena, MS	L 0–13		
September 24	Federal City*	Charles Kerg Field; Greenville, MS	W 27–6		
October 2	at Southern	University Stadium; Baton Rouge, LA	L 0–14		
October 9	at Miles*	Rickwood Field; Birmimgham, AL	L 0–6		
October 16	at No. 7 Grambling	Grambling Stadium; Grambling, LA	L 15–25	15,745–16,000	
October 23	Texas Southern	Magnolia Stadium; Itta Bena, MS	L 0–23		
October 30	Prairie View A&M	Magnolia Stadium; Itta Bena, MS	W 37–7		
November 6	at Alcorn A&M	Henderson Stadium; Lorman, MS	L 9–28		
November 20	Jackson State	Magnolia Stadium; Itta Bena, MS	L 7–17		
November 25	at Alabama State*	Cramton Bowl; Montgomery, AL	W 10–7	12,000	
*Non-conference game; Rankings from AP Poll released prior to the game
