= 1971 North Carolina A&T Aggies football team =

American college football season

1971 North Carolina A&T Aggies football
- Conference: Mid-Eastern Athletic Conference
- Record: 6–4–1 (3–2–1 MEAC)
- Head coach: Hornsby Howell (4th season)
- Home stadium: World War Memorial Stadium

1971 Mid-Eastern Athletic Conference football standings
	Conf.					Overall
Team	W		L		T	W		L		T
Morgan State $	5	–	0	–	1	6	–	4	–	1
North Carolina Central	5	–	1	–	0	7	–	2	–	0
South Carolina State	3	–	2	–	1	6	–	3	–	1
North Carolina A&T	3	–	2	–	1	6	–	4	–	1
Maryland Eastern Shore	1	–	4	–	1	1	–	5	–	2
Howard	1	–	5	–	0	4	–	5	–	0
Delaware State	1	–	5	–	0	1	–	8	–	0
$ – Conference champion

The 1971 North Carolina A&T Aggies football team represented North Carolina A&T State University as a member of the Mid-Eastern Athletic Conference (MEAC) during the 1971 NCAA College Division football season. Led by fourth-year head coach Hornsby Howell, the Aggies compiled an overall record of 6–4–1, with a mark of 3–2–1 in conference play, and finished tied for third in the MEAC.

== Schedule ==
Date	Opponent	Site	Result	Attendance	Source
September 18	at South Carolina State	State College Stadium; Orangeburg, SC (rivalry)	T 0–0	8,537	
September 25	Florida A&M*	World War Memorial Stadium; Greensboro, NC	L 6–9	15,720	
October 2	Johnson C. Smith*	World War Memorial Stadium; Greensboro, NC	W 13–0	16,832	
October 9	at Norfolk State*	Foreman Field; Norfolk, VA (Oyster Bowl)	W 25–3	3,784	
October 16	Maryland Eastern Shore^{†}	World War Memorial Stadium; Greensboro, NC	W 13–7	18,742	
October 23	Howard	World War Memorial Stadium; Greensboro, NC	W 13–3	1,103	
October 30	at Morgan State	Hughes Stadium; Baltimore, MD	L 20–21	11,814–12,156	
November 6	at Elizabeth City State*	Elizabeth City, NC	W 28–20	2,892	
November 13	at Delaware State	Alumni Stadium; Dover, DE	W 31–7	2,949	
November 20	North Carolina Central	World War Memorial Stadium; Greensboro, NC (rivalry)	L 13–14	6,005	
November 27	at Southern*	University Stadium; Baton Rouge, LA	L 16–24	3,871–5,691	
*Non-conference game; ^{†}Homecoming
