= 1971 Abilene Christian Wildcats football team =

American college football season

1971 Abilene Christian Wildcats football
- Conference: Southland Conference
- Record: 5–5 (0–4 Southland)
- Head coach: Wally Bullington (4th season)
- Home stadium: Shotwell Stadium

1971 Southland Conference football standings
	Conf.					Overall
Team	W		L		T	W		L		T
No. 4 Louisiana Tech +	4	–	1	–	0	9	–	2	–	0
Trinity (TX) +	4	–	1	–	0	8	–	2	–	0
Lamar +	4	–	1	–	0	5	–	6	–	0
SW Louisiana	2	–	2	–	1	5	–	4	–	1
Arkansas State	1	–	3	–	1	4	–	4	–	1
UT Arlington	1	–	4	–	0	2	–	9	–	0
Abilene Christian	0	–	4	–	0	5	–	5	–	0
$ – Conference champion; Rankings from AP small college poll

The 1971 Abilene Christian Wildcats football team was an American football team that represented Abilene Christian College (now known as Abilene Christian University) in the Southland Conference during the 1971 NCAA College Division football season. In their fourth year under head coach Wally Bullington, the team compiled a 5–5 record.

== Schedule ==
Date	Time	Opponent	Site	Result	Attendance	Source
September 11		vs. McMurry*	Shotwell Stadium; Abilene, TX	W 53–20	12,200	
September 18		at Drake*	Drake Stadium; Des Moines, IA	L 17–34	11,500	
September 25		at Nebraska–Omaha*	Al F. Caniglia Field; Omaha, NE	W 29–6	3,991	
October 2		Northern Colorado*	Shotwell Stadium; Abilene, TX	W 14–7	7,000	
October 9		at Eastern New Mexico*	Portales, NM	W 16–0	2,700	
October 23		at Arkansas State	War Memorial Stadium; Little Rock, AR	L 9–35	8,000	
October 30		Lamar	Shotwell Stadium; Abilene, TX	L 28–30	8,000	
November 6		at Southeastern Louisiana*	Strawberry Stadium; Hammond, LA	W 28–7	3,000	
November 13		Trinity (TX)	Shotwell Stadium; Abilene, TX	L 14–27	11,000	
November 27	2:00 p.m.	at UT Arlington	Turnpike Stadium; Arlington, TX	L 17–21	2,200–2,500	
*Non-conference game; All times are in Central time
