= 1971 Jackson State Tigers football team =

American college football season

1971 Jackson State Tigers football

Azalea Classic champion

Azalea Classic, W 40-21 vs. Alabama A&M
- Conference: Southwestern Athletic Conference
- Record: 9–1–1 (4–1–1 SWAC)
- Head coach: Robert Hill (1st season)
- Home stadium: Mississippi Veterans Memorial Stadium

1971 Southwestern Athletic Conference football standings
	Conf.					Overall
Team	W		L		T	W		L		T
No. 9 Grambling $	5	–	1	–	0	9	–	2	–	0
Jackson State	4	–	1	–	1	9	–	1	–	1
No. 16 Alcorn A&M	4	–	2	–	0	6	–	3	–	0
Texas Southern	3	–	2	–	1	7	–	2	–	1
Prairie View A&M	2	–	4	–	0	3	–	7	–	0
Mississippi Valley State	1	–	5	–	0	4	–	7	–	0
Southern	1	–	5	–	0	3	–	7	–	0
$ – Conference champion; Rankings from NAIA Division I poll for Grambling and UPI small college poll for Alcorn A&M

The 1971 Jackson State Tigers football team represented Jackson State College (now known as Jackson State University) as a member of the Southwestern Athletic Conference (SWAC) during the 1971 NCAA College Division football season. Led by first-year head coach Robert Hill, the Tigers compiled an overall record of 9–1–1, with a conference record of 4–1–1, and finished second in the SWAC.

== Schedule ==
Date	Opponent	Site	Result	Attendance	Source
September 18	at Prairie View A&M	Blackshear Field; Prairie View, TX	L 12–13		
October 2	at Kentucky State*	Alumni Field; Frankfort, KY	W 42–33	4,000	
October 9	Bishop*	Mississippi Veterans Memorial Stadium; Jackson, MS	W 40–7		
October 16	Southern	Mississippi Veterans Memorial Stadium; Jackson, MS (rivalry)	W 49–28		
October 23	Grambling	Mississippi Veterans Memorial Stadium; Jackson, MS	W 13–7	20,000–26,000	
October 30	Texas Lutheran*	Mississippi Veterans Memorial Stadium; Jackson, MS	W 48–20		
November 6	at Texas Southern	Jeppesen Stadium; Houston, TX	T 7–7		
November 13	Morgan State*	Mississippi Veterans Memorial Stadium; Jackson, MS	W 34–29	6,573	
November 20	at Mississippi Valley State	Magnolia Stadium; Itta Bena, MS	W 17–7		
November 25	Alcorn A&M	Mississippi Veterans Memorial Stadium; Jackson, MS (rivalry)	W 35–29		
December 4	vs. Alabama A&M*	Ladd Stadium; Mobile, AL (Azalea Classic)	W 40–21		
*Non-conference game
