= 1971 Delaware State Hornets football team =

American college football season

1971 Delaware State Hornets football
- Conference: Mid-Eastern Athletic Conference
- Record: 1–8 (1–5 MEAC)
- Head coach: Arnold Jeter (5th season)
- Home stadium: Alumni Stadium

1971 Mid-Eastern Athletic Conference football standings
	Conf.					Overall
Team	W		L		T	W		L		T
Morgan State $	5	–	0	–	1	6	–	4	–	1
North Carolina Central	5	–	1	–	0	7	–	2	–	0
South Carolina State	3	–	2	–	1	6	–	3	–	1
North Carolina A&T	3	–	2	–	1	6	–	4	–	1
Maryland Eastern Shore	1	–	4	–	1	1	–	5	–	2
Howard	1	–	5	–	0	4	–	5	–	0
Delaware State	1	–	5	–	0	1	–	8	–	0
$ – Conference champion

The 1971 Delaware State Hornets football team represented Delaware State College—now known as Delaware State University—as a member of the Mid-Eastern Athletic Conference (MEAC) in the 1971 NCAA College Division football season. This was their first season as a member of the newly formed MEAC. Led by fifth-year head coach Arnold Jeter, the Hornets compiled an overall record of 1–8 and a mark of 1–5 in conference play, tying for sixth in the MEAC. The team played most of the season with mainly freshmen and sophomores, as many veteran players were suspended after being involved in a drug scandal.

== Schedule ==
Date	Opponent	Site	Result	Attendance	Source
September 18	Lock Haven*	Alumni Stadium; Dover, DE	L 7–14		
September 25	at West Chester*	John A. Farrell Stadium; West Chester, PA	L 0–51	7,800	
October 2	at Hofstra*	James M. Shuart Stadium; Hempstead, NY	L 0–30		
October 9	Howard	Alumni Stadium; Dover, DE	L 3–29	3,000	
October 16	at North Carolina Central	O'Kelly Field; Durham, NC	L 3–34	1,009	
October 23	Morgan State	Alumni Stadium; Dover, DE	L 7–33	3,000	
October 30	at Maryland Eastern Shore	Princess Anne, MD	W 7–6		
November 13	North Carolina A&T	Alumni Stadium; Dover, DE	L 7–31	2,949	
November 20	at South Carolina State	State College Stadium; Orangeburg, SC	L 0–37	3,500	
*Non-conference game
