= 1971 Prairie View A&M Panthers football team =

American college football season

1971 Prairie View A&M Panthers football
- Conference: Southwestern Athletic Conference
- Record: 3–7 (2–4 SWAC)
- Head coach: Jim Hillyer (1st season)
- Home stadium: Edward L. Blackshear Field; Astrodome

1971 Southwestern Athletic Conference football standings
	Conf.					Overall
Team	W		L		T	W		L		T
No. 9 Grambling $	5	–	1	–	0	9	–	2	–	0
Jackson State	4	–	1	–	1	9	–	1	–	1
No. 16 Alcorn A&M	4	–	2	–	0	6	–	3	–	0
Texas Southern	3	–	2	–	1	7	–	2	–	1
Prairie View A&M	2	–	4	–	0	3	–	7	–	0
Mississippi Valley State	1	–	5	–	0	4	–	7	–	0
Southern	1	–	5	–	0	3	–	7	–	0
$ – Conference champion; Rankings from NAIA Division I poll for Grambling and UPI small college poll for Alcorn A&M

The 1971 Prairie View A&M Panthers football team represented Prairie View A&M College of Texas (now known as Prairie View A&M University) as a member of the Southwestern Athletic Conference (SWAC) during the 1971 NCAA College Division football season. Led by first-year head coach Jim Hillyer, the Panthers compiled an overall record of 3–7, with a conference record of 2–4, and finished fifth in the SWAC.

== Schedule ==
Date	Opponent	Site	Result	Attendance	Source
September 11	at Angelo State*	San Angelo Stadium; San Angelo, TX	L 14–21		
September 18	Jackson State	Edward L. Blackshear Field; Prairie View, TX	W 13–12		
September 25	Southern	Astrodome; Houston, TX	W 21–3		
October 2	at No. 3 Grambling	Grambling Stadium; Grambling, LA (rivalry)	L 7–30	15,175	
October 16	vs. No. 9 Tennessee State*	Cotton Bowl; Dallas, TX	L 20–42	15,000	
October 23	Quantico Marines*	Astrodome; Houston, TX	L 17–18		
October 30	at Mississippi Valley State	Magnolia Stadium; Itta Bena, MS	L 7–37		
November 6	Texas Lutheran*	Edward L. Blackshear Field; Prairie View, TX	W 16–7		
November 13	vs. Alcorn A&M	City Park Stadium; Vicksburg, MS	L 13–33		
November 25	vs. Texas Southern	Astrodome; Houston, TX (rivalry)	L 6–16		
*Non-conference game; Rankings from AP Poll released prior to the game
