= Grantland Rice Bowl =

Defunct college football bowl game

Grantland Rice Bowl (defunct)
- Stadium: Horace Jones Field (1964–68); BREC Memorial Stadium (1969–73); Tiger Stadium (1974–75); Dacotah Field (1976)
- Location: Murfreesboro, Tennessee (1964–68); Baton Rouge, Louisiana (1969–75); Fargo, North Dakota (1976); Anniston, Alabama (1977)
- Operated: 1964–1977

The Grantland Rice Bowl was an annual college football bowl game held from 1964 through 1977. The game originated as an NCAA College Division regional final, then became a playoff game for Division II. It was named in honor of Grantland Rice, an early 20th-century American sportswriter known for his elegant prose, and was originally played in his hometown of Murfreesboro, Tennessee.

== History ==
=== College Division ===
Mideast regional states of the College Division are shown in green; Louisiana was added in 1967.

The Grantland Rice Bowl originated as one of the four regional finals of the College Division, before it was subdivided into Division II and Division III in 1973. The game served as the championship for the Mideast Region from 1964 through 1972. The other three regional finals were the Tangerine (later Boardwalk), Pecan (later Pioneer), and Camellia bowls. At the time, there were no playoffs at any level of NCAA football. For the smaller colleges and universities, as for the major programs, the national champion was determined by polls conducted by the leading news wire services.

The bowl was created in August 1964, when the NCAA awarded the Mideast Region championship game to Murfreesboro, though the Grantland Rice name did not become official until two months later. The Murfreesboro Junior Chamber of Commerce (Jaycees) served as the local sponsor. The intent for the Mideast game was to match the two best non-major teams from a region of nine states: Alabama, Illinois, Indiana, Kentucky, Michigan, Mississippi, Ohio, Tennessee, and Wisconsin. The bowl was played at Horace Jones Field, the home stadium of Middle Tennessee State. The home team played in, and won, the inaugural game, witnessed by a disappointing crowd of just 4,000. Three of the next four games were plagued by poor attendance and/or cold weather, most notably the 1968 game, won by Terry Bradshaw's Louisiana Tech squad in a snow squall before 2,500 fans.

Louisiana Tech was eligible for the 1968 game because, in 1967, the NCAA moved the state of Louisiana from the Midwest Region to the Mideast Region. In April 1969, the NCAA moved the bowl to Baton Rouge, where it was played at Memorial Stadium, a 21,500-seat facility. The Downtown Lions Club of Baton Rouge assumed the role of local sponsor. With Bradshaw and Louisiana Tech again participating, the 1969 game drew a crowd of 16,000. The 1970 game attracted a record 17,000 fans, but local interest leveled off thereafter. Bowl organizers decided to keep the Grantland Rice name, even though the game's new home city and state had no connection to the late sportswriter. When the Rice Council of America was added as a sponsor, the name was shortened to the Rice Bowl, but only for the 1975 game. Sportswriters covering the game took no notice, and continued to refer to it as the Grantland Rice Bowl.

=== Division II ===
In 1973, the College Division was realigned into Division II and Division III, with a full eight-team playoff to determine a national champion in each division. The Grantland Rice Bowl became a national semifinal game in Division II, along with the Pioneer Bowl in Wichita Falls, Texas, with the winners advancing to the Camellia Bowl championship game in Sacramento, California. In 1974 and 1975, the game was played in a much larger venue, Tiger Stadium on the campus of LSU, though the crowds it attracted did not justify the move.

Starting in 1976, the NCAA gave up on neutral sites for the Division II semifinals, but the games retained their bowl designations even though they were now played on the home field of one of the participating teams. The Grantland Rice Bowl (with its original name officially restored) was hosted by North Dakota State in Fargo, North Dakota in 1976, and by Jacksonville State in Anniston, Alabama in 1977. The other semifinal in those two seasons was the Knute Rockne Bowl, likewise played on campus sites, while the championship game remained a neutral-site contest, moved to the Pioneer Bowl in Texas. The Grantland Rice Bowl was no longer contested after 1977, when the NCAA stopped attaching "bowl" designations to the Division II semifinals.

== Game results ==
| Season | Date | Winner | | Loser | | Ref. | Location | NCAA playoff |
|---|---|---|---|---|---|---|---|---|
| 1964 | December 12, 1964 | Middle Tennessee State | 20 | Muskingum | 0 | notes | Murfreesboro, TN | College Division; Regional Final |
| 1965 | December 11, 1965 | Tennessee State 14, Ball State 14 | | | | notes | Murfreesboro, TN | College Division; Regional Final |
| 1966 | December 10, 1966 | Tennessee State | 34 | Muskingum | 7 | notes | Murfreesboro, TN | College Division; Regional Final |
| 1967 | December 9, 1967 | Eastern Kentucky | 27 | Ball State | 13 | notes | Murfreesboro, TN | College Division; Regional Final |
| 1968 | December 14, 1968 | Louisiana Tech | 33 | Akron | 13 | notes | Murfreesboro, TN | College Division; Regional Final |
| 1969 | December 13, 1969 | East Tennessee State | 34 | Louisiana Tech | 14 | notes | Baton Rouge, LA | College Division; Regional Final |
| 1970 | December 12, 1970 | Tennessee State | 26 | Southwestern Louisiana | 25 | notes | Baton Rouge, LA | College Division; Regional Final |
| 1971 | December 11, 1971 | Tennessee State | 26 | McNeese State | 23 | notes | Baton Rouge, LA | College Division; Regional Final |
| 1972 | December 10, 1972 | Louisiana Tech | 35 | Tennessee Tech | 0 | notes | Baton Rouge, LA | College Division; Regional Final |
| 1973 | December 8, 1973 | Western Kentucky | 28 | Grambling | 20 | notes | Baton Rouge, LA | Division II semifinal |
| 1974 | December 7, 1974 | Delaware | 49 | UNLV | 11 | notes | Baton Rouge, LA | Division II semifinal |
| 1975 | December 6, 1975 | Western Kentucky | 14 | New Hampshire | 3 | notes | Baton Rouge, LA | Division II semifinal |
| 1976 | December 4, 1976 | Montana State | 10 | North Dakota State | 3 | notes | Fargo, ND | Division II semifinal |
| 1977 | December 3, 1977 | Jacksonville State | 31 | North Dakota State | 7 | notes | Anniston, AL | Division II semifinal |

== Appearances by team ==
Ticket stub from the 1975 game, reflecting the shortened "Rice Bowl" name.

Teams with more than one appearance are listed.

| Rank | Team | Appearances | Record |
|---|---|---|---|
| 1 | Tennessee State | 4 | 3–0–1 |
| 2 | Louisiana Tech | 3 | 2–1 |
| T3 | Western Kentucky | 2 | 2–0 |
| T3 | Ball State | 2 | 0–1–1 |
| T3 | Muskingum | 2 | 0–2 |
| T3 | North Dakota State | 2 | 0–2 |
