= Robert Jackson (American football coach) =

American football player and coach (1921–2010)

Bob Jackson
No. 34
- Position: Fullback

Personal information
- Born: October 26, 1921; Mineral, Virginia, U.S.
- Died: March 14, 2010 (aged 88); Raleigh, North Carolina, U.S.
- Listed height: 5 ft 11 in (1.80 m)
- Listed weight: 210 lb (95 kg)

Career information
- College: North Carolina A&T
- NFL draft: 1950: 16th round, 202nd overall pick

Career history

Playing
- New York Giants (1950–1951)

Coaching
- Johnson C. Smith (1953–1957) Head coach; St. Augustine's (1959) Assistant; Shaw (1960–1964) Head coach; Texas Southern (c. 1965) Assistant; North Carolina College / North Carolina Central (1968–1977) Assistant; North Carolina Central (1977) Co-interim head coach

Career NFL statistics
- Rushing yards: 122
- Rushing average: 7.2
- Touchdowns: 2
- Stats at Pro Football Reference

Head coaching record
- Regular season: 22–63–5 (.272)

Robert Herman "Stonewall" Jackson (October 26, 1921 – March 14, 2010) was an American professional football player and coach.

== Early life and education ==
He first served his country in World War II, and returned home to enroll in North Carolina A&T State University from 1946 to 1950. Jackson played fullback and linebacker at North Carolina A&T State University. He was a native of Mineral, Virginia.

== Career ==
Jackson was the first HBCU alumnus to be drafted by a National Football League (NFL) team when he was selected by the New York Giants in the 16th round (202nd overall) of the 1950 NFL draft.

After his two-year stint in the NFL, Jackson obtained his master's degree at Springfield College. He devoted over 40 years of his life to coaching and developing competitive student athletes. Even though Jackson spent most of his career at North Carolina Central University, he also coached football, basketball, track, and tennis at Johnson C. Smith University, St. Augustine's University, Shaw University, and Texas Southern University. He also served as a faculty member, trainer, and equipment manager at some of these institutions.

== Death ==
Jackson died on March 14, 2010, at Capital Rehabilitation and Nursing Center in Raleigh, North Carolina. He was interred at Arlington National Cemetery.

== Head coaching record ==
=== Football ===
Year	Team	Overall	Conference	Standing	Bowl/playoffs
Johnson C. Smith Golden Bulls (Central Intercollegiate Athletic Association) (1953–1957)
1953	Johnson C. Smith	5–3	5–2	7th	
1954	Johnson C. Smith	1–5–2	1–4–1	13th	
1955	Johnson C. Smith	3–4	2–4	13th	
1956	Johnson C. Smith	3–5	2–5	13th	
1957	Johnson C. Smith	1–6–1	1–6	17th	
Johnson C. Smith:		13–23–3	11–21–1		
Shaw Bears (Central Intercollegiate Athletic Association) (1960–1964)
1960	Shaw	3–6	3–5	14th	
1961	Shaw	1–8	1–8	14th	
1962	Shaw	1–7–1	1–7–1	17th	
1963	Shaw	2–8	2–6	14th	
1964	Shaw	2–7–1	2–6–1	14th	
Shaw:		9–36–2	9–32–2		
North Carolina Central Eagles (Central Intercollegiate Athletic Association) (1977)
1977	North Carolina Central	0–4 (Note: Willie Smith was North Carolina Central's head coach for the first seven games of the 1977 season before resigning. Jackson and Jesse Clements served as co-interim head coaches for the final four games. North Carolina Central finished the year 1–10 overall and 0–6 in Mid-Eastern Athletic Conference (MEAC) play.)	0–3	7th	
North Carolina Central:		0–4	0–3		
Total:		22–63–5			
