= 1971 NCAA College Division football season =

American college football season

- Champion(s): Delaware (AP, UPI); Tennessee State (black)

The 1971 NCAA College Division football season was the 16th season of college football in the United States organized by the National Collegiate Athletic Association at the NCAA College Division level.

== Conference standings ==
1971 Big Sky Conference football standings
	Conf.					Overall
Team	W		L		T	W		L		T
Idaho $	4	–	1	–	0	8	–	3	–	0
No. 7 Boise State	4	–	2	–	0	10	–	2	–	0
Montana	3	–	2	–	0	6	–	5	–	0
Weber State	3	–	2	–	1	7	–	2	–	1
Idaho State	2	–	3	–	0	6	–	4	–	0
Northern Arizona	1	–	3	–	0	5	–	5	–	0
Montana State	0	–	5	–	1	2	–	7	–	1
$ – Conference champion; Rankings from AP small college poll

1971 California Collegiate Athletic Association football standings
	Conf.					Overall
Team	W		L		T	W		L		T
Cal Poly $	3	–	0	–	0	6	–	5	–	0
Cal State Fullerton	3	–	1	–	0	7	–	4	–	0
Valley State	1	–	2	–	0	4	–	7	–	0
Cal Poly Pomona	1	–	3	–	0	6	–	5	–	0
UC Riverside	0	–	2	–	0	2	–	7	–	1
$ – Conference champion

1971 Central Intercollegiate Athletic Association football standings
	Conf.					Overall
Team	W		L		T	W		L		T
Northern
Elizabeth City State xy$	7	–	2	–	0	7	–	3	–	0
Virginia Union	5	–	2	–	1	5	–	2	–	2
Virginia State	3	–	2	–	0	5	–	3	–	1
Norfolk State	2	–	3	–	0	3	–	6	–	0
Hampton	1	–	6	–	0	1	–	9	–	0
Saint Paul's (VA)	0	–	5	–	1	1	–	7	–	1
Southern
Winston-Salem State xy	6	–	3	–	0	6	–	4	–	0
Johnson C. Smith	3	–	2	–	0	5	–	4	–	0
Fayetteville State	3	–	3	–	0	5	–	4	–	0
Livingstone	3	–	3	–	0	4	–	6	–	0
Shaw	3	–	5	–	0	4	–	6	–	0
Championship: Elizabeth City State 33, Winston-Salem State 22
$ – Conference champion; x – Division champion/co-champions; y – Championship game participant; Virginia State forfeited wins over Shaw and Virginia Union.

1971 College Athletic Conference football standings
	Conf.					Overall
Team	W		L		T	W		L		T
Southwestern (TN) +	3	–	1	–	0	5	–	2	–	0
Centre +	3	–	1	–	0	3	–	6	–	0
Washington and Lee	2	–	2	–	0	4	–	5	–	0
Washington University	1	–	3	–	0	4	–	5	–	0
Sewanee	1	–	3	–	0	2	–	6	–	0
+ – Conference co-champions

1971 College Conference of Illinois and Wisconsin football standings
	Conf.					Overall
Team	W		L		T	W		L		T
No. 3 Carthage $^	8	–	0	–	0	9	–	0	–	1
Augustana (IL)	5	–	3	–	0	5	–	4	–	0
Carroll (WI)	5	–	3	–	0	5	–	3	–	0
Illinois Wesleyan	5	–	3	–	0	5	–	4	–	0
Elmhurst	4	–	4	–	0	4	–	5	–	0
Millikin	4	–	4	–	0	5	–	4	–	0
North Park	4	–	4	–	0	4	–	5	–	0
Wheaton (IL)	1	–	7	–	0	1	–	8	–	0
North Central (IL)	0	–	8	–	0	0	–	9	–	0
$ – Conference champion; ^ – NAIA Division II playoff participant; Rankings from NAIA Division II poll

1971 Eastern Football Conference football standings
	Conf.					Overall
Team	W		L		T	W		L		T
Bridgeport $	4	–	0	–	0	10	–	1	–	0
Montclair State	3	–	1	–	0	7	–	2	–	0
Southern Connecticut State	2	–	2	–	0	5	–	4	–	0
Central Connecticut State	1	–	3	–	0	7	–	3	–	0
Glassboro State	0	–	4	–	0	2	–	6	–	0
$ – Conference champion

1971 Far Western Conference football standings
	Conf.					Overall
Team	W		L		T	W		L		T
UC Davis +	5	–	1	–	0	9	–	1	–	0
No. 11 Chico State +	5	–	1	–	0	9	–	2	–	0
Cal State Hayward	3	–	2	–	1	7	–	2	–	1
Humboldt State	3	–	3	–	0	7	–	4	–	0
Sacramento State	2	–	3	–	1	4	–	5	–	1
San Francisco State	2	–	4	–	0	5	–	6	–	0
Sonoma State	0	–	6	–	0	2	–	8	–	0
+ – Conference co-champions; Rankings from UPI small college poll

1971 Gulf South Conference football standings
	Conf.					Overall
Team	W		L		T	W		L		T
No. 1 Livingston +^	5	–	1	–	0	11	–	1	–	0
Troy State +	5	–	1	–	0	6	–	3	–	0
Jacksonville State	3	–	2	–	0	6	–	3	–	0
Tennessee–Martin	3	–	3	–	0	5	–	5	–	0
Delta State	2	–	4	–	0	3	–	5	–	1
Florence State	0	–	6	–	0	1	–	10	–	0
Southeastern Louisiana	0	–	6	–	0	0	–	11	–	0
+ – Conference co-champions; ^ – NAIA Division I playoff participant; Rankings from NAIA Division I poll

1971 Independent College Athletic Conference football standings
	Conf.					Overall
Team	W		L		T	W		L		T
Alfred $	3	–	0	–	0	8	–	0	–	0
St. Lawrence	1	–	2	–	0	5	–	3	–	0
Hobart	1	–	2	–	0	5	–	4	–	0
RPI	1	–	2	–	0	4	–	5	–	0
$ – Conference champion

1971 Indiana Collegiate Conference football standings
	Conf.					Overall
Team	W		L		T	W		L		T
Saint Joseph's (IN) $	4	–	0	–	0	8	–	2	–	0
Valparaiso	3	–	1	–	0	8	–	2	–	0
Evansville	2	–	2	–	0	3	–	6	–	0
Butler	1	–	3	–	0	3	–	7	–	0
DePauw	0	–	4	–	0	1	–	8	–	0
Indiana Central *	0	–	0	–	0	6	–	5	–	0
Wabash *	0	–	0	–	0	5	–	5	–	0
$ – Conference champion; * – ineligible for conference title

1971 Iowa Conference football standings
	Conf.					Overall
Team	W		L		T	W		L		T
Luther $	6	–	1	–	0	8	–	1	–	0
Buena Vista	5	–	2	–	0	6	–	2	–	0
William Penn	5	–	2	–	0	6	–	3	–	0
Central (IA)	4	–	3	–	0	6	–	3	–	0
Simpson (IA)	4	–	3	–	0	5	–	4	–	0
Wartburg	3	–	4	–	0	4	–	5	–	0
Upper Iowa	0	–	6	–	1	2	–	6	–	1
Dubuque	0	–	6	–	1	1	–	7	–	1
$ – Conference champion

1971 Little Three Conference football standings
	Conf.					Overall
Team	W		L		T	W		L		T
Williams $	2	–	0	–	0	7	–	1	–	0
Amherst	1	–	1	–	0	6	–	2	–	0
Wesleyan	0	–	2	–	0	3	–	6	–	0
$ – Conference champion

1971 Maine Intercollegiate Athletic Association football standings
	Conf.					Overall
Team	W		L		T	W		L		T
Bowdoin $	2	–	0	–	0	3	–	4	–	0
Colby	1	–	1	–	0	4	–	4	–	0
Bates	0	–	2	–	0	0	–	8	–	0
$ – Conference champion

1971 Mason–Dixon Conference football standings
	Conf.					Overall
Team	W		L		T	W		L		T
Hampden–Sydney $	4	–	0	–	0	10	–	1	–	0
Johns Hopkins *	2	–	0	–	0	6	–	3	–	0
Bridgewater	3	–	1	–	0	6	–	3	–	0
Western Maryland	1	–	3	–	0	5	–	4	–	0
Randolph–Macon	1	–	3	–	0	4	–	5	–	0
Gallaudet *	0	–	1	–	0	1	–	7	–	0
Towson State	0	–	3	–	0	1	–	8	–	0
$ – Conference champion; * – ineligible for conference title

1971 Michigan Intercollegiate Athletic Association football standings
	Conf.					Overall
Team	W		L		T	W		L		T
No. 10 Alma +	4	–	1	–	0	7	–	2	–	0
Adrian +	4	–	1	–	0	5	–	4	–	0
Olivet	2	–	2	–	1	3	–	4	–	1
Kalamazoo	2	–	3	–	0	5	–	3	–	0
Hope	2	–	3	–	0	4	–	5	–	0
Albion	0	–	4	–	1	0	–	7	–	2
+ – Conference co-champions; Rankings from NAIA Division II poll

1971 Mid-Eastern Athletic Conference football standings
	Conf.					Overall
Team	W		L		T	W		L		T
Morgan State $	5	–	0	–	1	6	–	4	–	1
North Carolina Central	5	–	1	–	0	7	–	2	–	0
South Carolina State	3	–	2	–	1	6	–	3	–	1
North Carolina A&T	3	–	2	–	1	6	–	4	–	1
Maryland Eastern Shore	1	–	4	–	1	1	–	5	–	2
Howard	1	–	5	–	0	4	–	5	–	0
Delaware State	1	–	5	–	0	1	–	8	–	0
$ – Conference champion

1971 Middle Atlantic Conference football standings
	Conf.					Overall
Team	W		L		T	W		L		T
Northern Division
Upsala x	4	–	3	–	0	5	–	3	–	0
Albright	3	–	3	–	1	3	–	5	–	1
Delaware Valley	3	–	4	–	0	4	–	4	–	0
Juniata	1	–	4	–	2	3	–	4	–	2
Lycoming	2	–	5	–	0	2	–	6	–	0
Susquehanna	0	–	5	–	1	3	–	6	–	1
Wilkes *	4	–	0	–	0	6	–	2	–	0
Wagner *	3	–	1	–	0	5	–	4	–	0
Southern Division
Franklin & Marshall x	6	–	1	–	0	6	–	2	–	0
Western Maryland	4	–	1	–	0	5	–	4	–	0
Johns Hopkins	5	–	2	–	0	6	–	3	–	0
Moravian	6	–	3	–	0	6	–	3	–	0
Lebanon Valley	5	–	3	–	0	5	–	4	–	0
Pennsylvania Military	4	–	3	–	0	7	–	3	–	0
Ursinus	4	–	3	–	0	4	–	4	–	0
Muhlenberg	5	–	4	–	0	5	–	4	–	0
Dickinson	3	–	4	–	0	3	–	5	–	0
Haverford	1	–	6	–	0	2	–	6	–	0
Swarthmore	0	–	8	–	0	0	–	8	–	0
x – Division champion/co-champions; * – Ineligible due to insufficient conference games

1971 Midwest Conference football standings
	Conf.					Overall
Team	W		L		T	W		L		T
Monmouth (IL) +	7	–	1	–	0	8	–	1	–	0
St. Olaf +	7	–	1	–	0	8	–	1	–	0
Cornell (IA)	5	–	3	–	0	6	–	3	–	0
Lawrence	5	–	3	–	0	6	–	3	–	0
Knox	4	–	4	–	0	5	–	4	–	0
Ripon	4	–	4	–	0	5	–	4	–	0
Coe	2	–	6	–	0	3	–	6	–	0
Grinnell	1	–	7	–	0	2	–	8	–	0
Carleton	1	–	7	–	0	1	–	8	–	0
Beloit	0	–	0	–	0	1	–	8	–	0
+ – Conference co-champions; Beloit was allowed to compete with freshmen. Games with Beloit were not counted in the conference standings.

1971 Minnesota Intercollegiate Athletic Conference football standings
	Conf.					Overall
Team	W		L		T	W		L		T
No. 7 Saint John's (MN) +	6	–	1	–	0	8	–	1	–	0
Gustavus Adolphus +	6	–	1	–	0	6	–	4	–	0
Minnesota–Duluth	5	–	2	–	0	6	–	3	–	1
Concordia-Moorhead	4	–	3	–	0	7	–	3	–	0
Hamline	4	–	3	–	0	7	–	3	–	0
St. Thomas (MN)	2	–	5	–	0	3	–	7	–	0
Macalester	1	–	6	–	0	1	–	7	–	1
Augsburg	0	–	7	–	0	1	–	8	–	0
+ – Conference co-champions; Rankings from NAIA Division I poll

1971 Missouri Intercollegiate Athletic Association football standings
	Conf.					Overall
Team	W		L		T	W		L		T
NE Missouri State $	6	–	0	–	0	9	–	1	–	0
SE Missouri State	4	–	2	–	0	7	–	3	–	1
Lincoln (MO)	3	–	3	–	0	5	–	5	–	0
Missouri–Rolla	2	–	3	–	1	4	–	6	–	1
NW Missouri State	2	–	4	–	0	4	–	5	–	0
Central Missouri State	2	–	4	–	0	4	–	6	–	0
SW Missouri State	1	–	4	–	1	1	–	8	–	1
$ – Conference champion

1971 New Jersey State Athletic Conference football standings
	Conf.					Overall
Team	W		L		T	W		L		T
Montclair State $	3	–	0	–	0	7	–	2	–	0
Jersey City State	1	–	2	–	0	7	–	2	–	0
Trenton State	1	–	2	–	0	2	–	5	–	1
Glassboro State	1	–	2	–	0	2	–	6	–	0
$ – Conference champion

1971 North Central Conference football standings
	Conf.					Overall
Team	W		L		T	W		L		T
No. 9 North Dakota $	5	–	1	–	0	6	–	3	–	1
North Dakota State	4	–	2	–	0	7	–	2	–	0
Northern Iowa	4	–	2	–	0	4	–	5	–	0
Morningside	3	–	3	–	0	6	–	4	–	0
South Dakota	3	–	3	–	0	3	–	7	–	0
South Dakota State	2	–	4	–	0	3	–	7	–	0
Augustana (SD)	0	–	6	–	0	1	–	8	–	1
Mankato State *	0	–	0	–	0	7	–	3	–	0
$ – Conference champion; * – Ineligible for conference title; Rankings from AP small college poll

1971 Northern Intercollegiate Conference football standings
	Conf.					Overall
Team	W		L		T	W		L		T
Moorhead State $	6	–	0	–	0	7	–	1	–	1
Michigan Tech	5	–	1	–	0	8	–	1	–	0
Minnesota Morris	3	–	2	–	1	4	–	4	–	1
Bemidji State	3	–	2	–	1	3	–	5	–	1
St. Cloud State	2	–	4	–	0	2	–	7	–	0
Winona State	1	–	5	–	0	1	–	9	–	0
Southwest State (MN)	0	–	6	–	0	0	–	10	–	0
$ – Conference champion

1971 Ohio Athletic Conference football standings
	Conf.					Overall
Team	W		L		T	W		L		T
Ohio Wesleyan $	6	–	0	–	0	8	–	1	–	0
Baldwin–Wallace	4	–	1	–	0	9	–	1	–	0
Mount Union	3	–	1	–	0	7	–	2	–	0
Heidelberg	4	–	2	–	0	6	–	3	–	0
Wooster	3	–	2	–	0	7	–	2	–	0
Denison	4	–	3	–	0	5	–	4	–	0
Marietta	3	–	3	–	0	4	–	5	–	0
Wittenberg	2	–	2	–	0	5	–	4	–	0
Capital	2	–	4	–	0	3	–	6	–	0
Otterbein	2	–	4	–	0	3	–	6	–	0
Kenyon	1	–	4	–	0	3	–	6	–	0
Muskingum	1	–	5	–	0	1	–	8	–	0
Oberlin	0	–	4	–	0	0	–	8	–	0
$ – Conference champion

1971 Ohio Valley Conference football standings
	Conf.					Overall
Team	W		L		T	W		L		T
No. 6/12 Western Kentucky $	6	–	1	–	0	8	–	2	–	0
Tennessee Tech	5	–	2	–	0	8	–	2	–	0
Middle Tennessee	5	–	2	–	0	7	–	4	–	0
Morehead State	4	–	3	–	0	7	–	3	–	0
Murray State	3	–	3	–	1	5	–	4	–	1
Eastern Kentucky	3	–	4	–	0	5	–	6	–	0
Austin Peay	1	–	6	–	0	2	–	8	–	0
East Tennessee State	0	–	6	–	1	0	–	9	–	1
$ – Conference champion; Rankings from AP/UPI small college polls

1971 Pennsylvania State Athletic Conference football standings
	Conf.					Overall
Team	W		L		T	W		L		T
East Division
West Chester xy$	5	–	0	–	0	9	–	1	–	0
East Stroudsburg	4	–	2	–	0	6	–	3	–	0
Millersville	4	–	2	–	0	6	–	3	–	0
Kutztown	4	–	2	–	0	4	–	5	–	0
Bloomsburg	2	–	4	–	0	4	–	5	–	0
Mansfield	1	–	5	–	0	3	–	6	–	0
Cheyney	0	–	5	–	0	1	–	8	–	0
West Division
No. 5 Edinboro xy	5	–	0	–	0	9	–	1	–	0
Slippery Rock	4	–	1	–	0	7	–	2	–	0
Clarion	3	–	2	–	0	6	–	3	–	0
Lock Haven	2	–	3	–	0	4	–	4	–	0
California (PA)	1	–	4	–	0	1	–	8	–	0
Shippensburg	0	–	5	–	0	2	–	6	–	0
Championship: West Chester 35, Edinboro 14
$ – Conference champion; x – Division champion/co-champions; y – Championship game participant; Rankings from NAIA Division II poll

1971 Presidents' Athletic Conference football standings
	Conf.					Overall
Team	W		L		T	W		L		T
John Carroll $	4	–	1	–	0	4	–	5	–	0
Thiel	3	–	2	–	0	5	–	3	–	0
Washington & Jefferson	3	–	2	–	0	0	–	5	–	3
Allegheny	2	–	3	–	0	4	–	4	–	0
Bethany (WV)	2	–	3	–	0	3	–	5	–	1
Case Western Reserve	1	–	4	–	0	3	–	6	–	0
Hiram *	0	–	0	–	0	1	–	7	–	0
$ – Conference champion; * – Ineligible for conference title

1971 Southern California Intercollegiate Athletic Conference football standings
	Conf.					Overall
Team	W		L		T	W		L		T
Occidental $	3	–	1	–	0	3	–	6	–	0
Claremont-Mudd	3	–	2	–	0	7	–	2	–	0
Whittier	3	–	2	–	0	5	–	4	–	1
Pomona	3	–	2	–	0	4	–	5	–	0
La Verne	1	–	3	–	0	1	–	6	–	1
Redlands	1	–	4	–	0	2	–	8	–	0
$ – Conference champion

1971 Southland Conference football standings
	Conf.					Overall
Team	W		L		T	W		L		T
No. 4 Louisiana Tech +	4	–	1	–	0	9	–	2	–	0
Trinity (TX) +	4	–	1	–	0	8	–	2	–	0
Lamar +	4	–	1	–	0	5	–	6	–	0
SW Louisiana	2	–	2	–	1	5	–	4	–	1
Arkansas State	1	–	3	–	1	4	–	4	–	1
UT Arlington	1	–	4	–	0	2	–	9	–	0
Abilene Christian	0	–	4	–	0	5	–	5	–	0
$ – Conference champion; Rankings from AP small college poll

1971 Southwestern Athletic Conference football standings
	Conf.					Overall
Team	W		L		T	W		L		T
No. 9 Grambling $	5	–	1	–	0	9	–	2	–	0
Jackson State	4	–	1	–	1	9	–	1	–	1
No. 16 Alcorn A&M	4	–	2	–	0	6	–	3	–	0
Texas Southern	3	–	2	–	1	7	–	2	–	1
Prairie View A&M	2	–	4	–	0	3	–	7	–	0
Mississippi Valley State	1	–	5	–	0	4	–	7	–	0
Southern	1	–	5	–	0	3	–	7	–	0
$ – Conference champion; Rankings from NAIA Division I poll for Grambling and UPI small college poll for Alcorn A&M

1971 Wisconsin State University Conference football standings
	Conf.					Overall
Team	W		L		T	W		L		T
No. 11 Wisconsin–Platteville +	7	–	1	–	0	9	–	1	–	0
No. 14 Wisconsin–La Crosse +	7	–	1	–	0	8	–	2	–	0
Wisconsin–Superior	6	–	2	–	0	6	–	4	–	0
Wisconsin–Eau Claire	4	–	4	–	0	6	–	4	–	0
Wisconsin–Oshkosh	4	–	4	–	0	4	–	6	–	0
Wisconsin–Stout	3	–	5	–	0	5	–	5	–	0
Wisconsin–River Falls	2	–	6	–	0	3	–	7	–	0
Wisconsin–Whitewater	2	–	6	–	0	3	–	7	–	0
Wisconsin–Stevens Point	1	–	7	–	0	1	–	9	–	0
+ – Conference co-champions; Wisconsin–Whitewater forfeited five games.; Rankings from NAIA Division I poll

1971 Yankee Conference football standings
	Conf.					Overall
Team	W		L		T	W		L		T
Connecticut +	3	–	1	–	1	5	–	3	–	1
UMass +	3	–	1	–	1	4	–	4	–	1
New Hampshire	3	–	2	–	0	4	–	4	–	1
Rhode Island	2	–	3	–	0	3	–	6	–	0
Vermont	2	–	3	–	0	2	–	7	–	0
Maine	1	–	4	–	0	2	–	6	–	0
+ – Conference co-champions

1971 NCAA College Division independents football records
	Conf.			Overall
Team	W	L	T	W		L		T
No. 1 Delaware		–		10	–	1	–	0
No. 5 Tennessee State		–		9	–	1	–	0
No. 2 McNeese State		–		9	–	1	–	1
Samford		–		8	–	1	–	0
Colorado College		–		7	–	1	–	0
No. 8 Akron		–		8	–	2	–	0
No. 3 Eastern Michigan		–		7	–	1	–	2
Arkansas AM&N		–		7	–	2	–	0
Indiana (PA)		–		7	–	2	–	0
Kentucky State		–		8	–	3	–	0
Appalachian State		–		7	–	3	–	1
Northern Michigan		–		7	–	3	–	0
Hawaii		–		7	–	4	–	0
Ashland		–		6	–	4	–	0
Santa Clara		–		6	–	4	–	0
Southern Illinois		–		6	–	4	–	0
Tampa		–		6	–	5	–	0
UNLV		–		5	–	4	–	1
Bucknell		–		5	–	5	–	0
Central Michigan		–		5	–	5	–	0
Milwaukee		–		5	–	5	–	0
Nevada		–		5	–	5	–	0
St. Norbert		–		5	–	5	–	0
Wayne State (MI)		–		4	–	4	–	0
Hofstra		–		5	–	6	–	0
Cortland		–		4	–	5	–	0
Northeastern		–		4	–	5	–	0
Portland State		–		4	–	5	–	0
Ball State		–		4	–	5	–	1
Chicago		–		3	–	4	–	0
Northeast Louisiana		–		4	–	6	–	1
Eastern Illinois		–		4	–	6	–	0
Indiana State		–		4	–	6	–	0
Saint Mary's		–		3	–	5	–	0
Rose-Hulman		–		3	–	6	–	0
Boston University		–		3	–	7	–	0
Drexel		–		2	–	6	–	0
Chattanooga		–		2	–	9	–	0
Rankings from AP small college poll

== Rankings ==
College Division teams (also referred to as "small college") were ranked in polls by the AP (a panel of writers) and by UPI (coaches). The national champion(s) for each season were determined by the final poll rankings, published at or near the end of the regular season, before any bowl games were played.

=== Small college final polls ===
Delaware, who during the regular season had defeated Rutgers, Villanova, and Boston University, averaged 40 points per game, and had a 9–1 record, was ranked first by both UPI and AP; both polls also ranked McNeese State (9–0–1) second, and Eastern Michigan (7–0–2) third.

United Press International (coaches) final poll
Published on November 24

Rank	School	Record	No. 1 votes	Total points
1	Delaware	9–1	20	306
2	McNeese State	9–0–1	5	267
3	Eastern Michigan	7–0–2	3	238
4	Tennessee State	8–1	1	185
5	C.W. Post	8–1		130
6	Arkansas Tech	11–0		95
7	Samford	8–1		78
8	Northern Colorado	8–1–1	2	75
9	Louisiana Tech	8–2		74
10	Howard Payne	9–1–1		48

Associated Press (writers) final poll
Published on November 24

Rank	School	Record	No. 1 votes	Total points
1	Delaware	9–1	9	256
2	McNeese State	9–0–1	3	233
3	Eastern Michigan	7–0–2		201
4	Louisiana Tech	8–2		153
5	Tennessee State	8–1	1	150
6	Western Kentucky	8–2		96
7	Boise State	9–2		92
8	Akron	8–2		91
9	North Dakota	6–3–1		72
10	Arkansas Tech	11–0		46

== Bowl games ==
The postseason consisted of four bowl games as regional finals, all played on December 11. This was the first year for the Pioneer Bowl; it succeeded the Pecan Bowl, which had been played in Arlington, Texas.

Top-ranked Delaware met C.W. Post in the Boardwalk Bowl; played indoors at Convention Hall, Delaware won by 50 points in a rout. The next two teams in the polls both lost; Eastern Michigan was defeated by Louisiana Tech in the Pioneer Bowl, and McNeese State fell to Tennessee State—led by future National Football League quarterback Joe Gilliam—in the Grantland Rice Bowl. Out west in the Camellia Bowl, Boise State mounted a 25–0 fourth quarter comeback to defeat Chico State.

Bowl	Region	Location	Winning team		Losing team		Ref
Boardwalk	East	Atlantic City, New Jersey	Delaware	72	C.W. Post	22	
Grantland Rice	Mideast	Baton Rouge, Louisiana	Tennessee State	26	McNeese State	23	
Pioneer	Midwest	Wichita Falls, Texas	Louisiana Tech	14	Eastern Michigan	3	
Camellia	West	Sacramento, California	Boise State	32	Chico State	28	

== See also ==
- 1971 NCAA University Division football season
- 1971 NAIA Division I football season
- 1971 NAIA Division II football season
