= 1970 Weber State Wildcats football team =

American college football season

1970 Weber State Wildcats football
- Conference: Big Sky Conference
- Record: 5–5–1 (3–3 Big Sky)
- Head coach: Sark Arslanian (6th season)
- Home stadium: Wildcat Stadium

1970 Big Sky Conference football standings
	Conf.					Overall
Team	W		L		T	W		L		T
Montana $	5	–	0	–	0	10	–	1	–	0
Idaho State	3	–	2	–	0	5	–	5	–	0
Boise State	2	–	2	–	0	8	–	3	–	0
Weber State	3	–	3	–	0	5	–	5	–	1
Idaho	2	–	2	–	0	4	–	7	–	0
Montana State	1	–	5	–	0	2	–	8	–	0
Northern Arizona	0	–	4	–	0	2	–	8	–	0
$ – Conference champion; Boise State's game against Long Beach State and Northern Arizona's game against New Mexico State counted in the conference standings.

The 1970 Weber State Wildcats football team represented Weber State College (now known as Weber State University) as a member of the Big Sky Conference during the 1970 NCAA College Division football season. Led by sixth-year head coach Sark Arslanian, the Wildcats compiled an overall record of 5–5–1 with a mark of 3–3 in conference play, placing in a three-way tie for third in the Big Sky.

== Schedule ==
Date	Opponent	Site	Result	Attendance	Source
September 12	Oshkosh State*	Wildcat Stadium; Ogden, UT	W 60–0	12,033	
September 19	Drake*	Wildcat Stadium; Ogden, UT	L 19–36	14,036	
September 26	Parsons*	Wildcat Stadium; Ogden, UT	W 28–3	11,432	
October 3	at No. 3 Montana	Dornblaser Field; Missoula, MT	L 29–38	12,000–12,500	
October 10	at Portland State*	Civic Stadium; Portland, OR	L 14–46	3,631	
October 17	Montana State	Wildcat Stadium; Ogden, UT	W 56–13	5,881	
October 24	Idaho State	Wildcat Stadium; Ogden, UT	L 14–30	6,472	
October 31	at Northern Arizona	Lumberjack Stadium; Flagstaff, AZ	W 38–6	5,725–7,000	
November 7	at Idaho	Rogers Field; Pullman, WA	L 17–27	4,500	
November 14	at Boise State	Bronco Stadium; Boise, ID	W 41–7	11,865	
November 21	South Dakota*	Wildcat Stadium; Ogden, UT	T 21–21	3,742	
*Non-conference game; Rankings from AP Poll released prior to the game
