= 1970 Montana Grizzlies football team =

American college football season

1970 Montana Grizzlies football

Big Sky champion

Camellia Bowl, L 16–31 vs. North Dakota State
- Conference: Big Sky Conference

Ranking
- Coaches: No. 3
- AP: No. 2
- Record: 10–1 (5–0 Big Sky)
- Head coach: Jack Swarthout (4th season)
- Captains: Jim Nordstrom; Jim DeBord
- Home stadium: Dornblaser Field

1970 Big Sky Conference football standings
	Conf.					Overall
Team	W		L		T	W		L		T
Montana $	5	–	0	–	0	10	–	1	–	0
Idaho State	3	–	2	–	0	5	–	5	–	0
Boise State	2	–	2	–	0	8	–	3	–	0
Weber State	3	–	3	–	0	5	–	5	–	1
Idaho	2	–	2	–	0	4	–	7	–	0
Montana State	1	–	5	–	0	2	–	8	–	0
Northern Arizona	0	–	4	–	0	2	–	8	–	0
$ – Conference champion; Boise State's game against Long Beach State and Northern Arizona's game against New Mexico State counted in the conference standings.

The 1970 Montana Grizzlies football team represented the University of Montana in the 1970 NCAA College Division football season as a member of the Big Sky Conference (Big Sky). The Grizzlies were led by fourth-year head coach Jack Swarthout and played their home games at Dornblaser Field.

Similar to the previous season, Montana won all ten games in the regular season (5–0 Big Sky, champions), but lost to North Dakota State in the Camellia Bowl in Sacramento in December. New conference member Northern Arizona was played this season, but not Boise State.

Defensive tackle Larry Miller was a third-team selection on the Little All-America team.

== Schedule ==
Date	Time	Opponent	Rank	Site	Result	Attendance	Source
September 12	8:00 pm	North Dakota*		Daylis Stadium; Billings, MT	W 28–7	6,500–7,000	
September 19	6:30 pm	at Northern Illinois*		Huskie Stadium; DeKalb, IL	W 30–6	11,278–13,000	
September 26	1:30 pm	at No. 11 Northern Arizona	No. 2	Lumberjack Stadium; Flagstaff, AZ	W 20–0	8,500	
October 3	1:30 pm	Weber State	No. 3	Dornblaser Field; Missoula, MT	W 38–29	12,000–12,500	
October 10	2:30 pm	at Idaho	No. 2	Rogers Field; Pullman, WA (Little Brown Stein)	W 44–26	4,600	
October 17	8:00 pm	at Idaho State	No. 2	ASISU Minidome; Pocatello, ID	W 35–34	12,200–12,300	
October 24	12:30 pm	at South Dakota*	No. 2	Inman Field; Vermillion, SD	W 35–7	7,200–7,500	
October 31	2:15 pm	Portland State*^{†}	No. 2	Dornblaser Field; Missoula, MT	W 31–25	12,500	
November 7	1:30 pm	Montana State	No. 2	Dornblaser Field; Missoula, MT (rivalry)	W 35–0	12,300–12,500	
November 14	12:30 pm	at South Dakota State*	No. 2	Coughlin–Alumni Stadium; Brookings, SD	W 24–0	5,000	
December 12		vs. No. 3 North Dakota State*	No. 2	Charles C. Hughes Stadium; Sacramento, CA (Camellia Bowl)	L 16–31	13,177	
*Non-conference game; ^{†}Homecoming; Rankings from AP Poll released prior to the game; All times are in Mountain time

== Coaching staff ==
- Jack Elway (AHC, DB)
- Bill Betcher (OL)
- Charley Armey (DL)
- Ron Nord (LB, E)
