= 1970 Idaho Vandals football team =

American college football season

1970 Idaho Vandals football
- Conference: Big Sky Conference
- Record: 4–7 (2–2 Big Sky)
- Head coach: Don Robbins (1st season)
- Offensive coordinator: Bobby Thompson (2nd season)
- Defensive coordinator: Ray Fulton (1st season)
- Base defense: 5–2
- Captains: Steve Olson; Ron Davis; Tim Reese
- Home stadium: Rogers Field

1970 Big Sky Conference football standings
	Conf.					Overall
Team	W		L		T	W		L		T
Montana $	5	–	0	–	0	10	–	1	–	0
Idaho State	3	–	2	–	0	5	–	5	–	0
Boise State	2	–	2	–	0	8	–	3	–	0
Weber State	3	–	3	–	0	5	–	5	–	1
Idaho	2	–	2	–	0	4	–	7	–	0
Montana State	1	–	5	–	0	2	–	8	–	0
Northern Arizona	0	–	4	–	0	2	–	8	–	0
$ – Conference champion; Boise State's game against Long Beach State and Northern Arizona's game against New Mexico State counted in the conference standings.

The 1970 Idaho Vandals football team represented the University of Idaho as a member of Big Sky Conference during the 1970 NCAA University Division football season. The Vandals were led by first-year head coach Don Robbins. Without a usable stadium on their Moscow campus for a second year, they played their home games at Rogers Field at Washington State University in Pullman, Washington.

Shortly after spring drills in May 1970, head coach Y C McNease was fired and assistant coach Robbins was promoted. With quarterbacks Steve Olson and Tom Ponciano running the offense, the Vandals were 4–7 overall and 2–2 in the Big Sky. Winless after six games, they won four straight before dropping the finale. Entering the homecoming game on October 24, Idaho had a ten-game losing streak.

In the Battle of the Palouse, the Vandals suffered a fourth straight loss to neighbor Washington State of the Pac-8, falling 44–16 at Joe Albi Stadium in Spokane on September 19. After a scoreless first quarter, Idaho led by ten at halftime, but was then outscored 38–0. It broke a ten-game losing streak for the Cougars, and was their only win of the season. The game with WSU was not played in 1969 or 1971.

The Big Sky added two teams this season, but the Vandals played neither. The new rivalry with Boise State began in 1971 and Idaho did not schedule Northern Arizona until 1975.

The Vandals' former venue on campus, Neale Stadium, had been declared structurally unsafe due to soil erosion in the summer of 1969, and its south grandstand burned that November in a suspected arson. Idaho played home games at Rogers Field in Pullman in 1969 and 1970. In April 1970, Rogers Field also burned in a suspected arson, which destroyed most of the primary grandstand on the south sideline, including the press box. WSU played its home games in 1970 and 1971 in Spokane at Joe Albi Stadium. Requiring less seating capacity, Idaho continued at Rogers in 1970, with reserved seating switched to the north side and students in the unburned lower section of the south grandstand. The new Idaho Stadium opened in October 1971.

== University division ==
Through 1977, the Big Sky was a college division (renamed Division II in 1973) conference for football, except for university division (Division I) member Idaho, which moved down to the new Division I-AA in 1978. Idaho maintained its upper division status in the NCAA by playing university division non-conference opponents (and was ineligible for the college division postseason).

== Schedule ==
Date	Time	Opponent	Site	Result	Attendance	Source
September 12	12:30 pm	at Air Force*	Falcon Stadium; Colorado Springs, CO	L 7–45	22,279–25,000	
September 19	1:30 pm	at Washington State*	Joe Albi Stadium; Spokane, WA (Battle of the Palouse)	L 16–44	27,200	
September 26	1:30 pm	Pacific (CA)*	Rogers Field; Pullman, WA	L 10–17	8,600–10,000	
October 3	7:00 pm	at Idaho State	ASISU Minidome; Pocatello, ID	L 14–35	12,500	
October 10	1:30 pm	Montana	Rogers Field; Pullman, WA (Little Brown Stein)	L 26–44	4,600	
October 17	1:30 pm	at Oregon*	Autzen Stadium; Eugene, OR	L 13–49	21,300	
October 24	1:30 pm	Portland State*^{†}	Rogers Field; Pullman, WA	W 17–16	6,700	
October 31	12:00 pm	at Montana State	Gatton Field; Bozeman, MT	W 37–24	4,500	
November 7	12:30 pm	Weber State	Rogers Field; Pullman, WA	W 27–17	4,500	
November 14	12:30 pm	at Utah State*	Romney Stadium; Logan, UT	W 42–14	10,000	
November 21	11:30 am	at Tulsa*	Skelly Field; Tulsa, OK	L 17–30	8,500	
*Non-conference game; ^{†}Homecoming; All times are in Pacific time

== Roster ==
1970 Idaho Vandals football team roster
Players
Coaches
Offense

Pos.	#	Name	Class
QB	10	Tom Ponciano	Jr
QB	11	Steve Olson (C)	Sr
QB	12	Bruce Cole	So
QB	18	Pete Glindeman	Jr
RB	20	Fred Riley	Jr
WR	21	Jess Vernier
RB	22	Robert Williams	Jr
RB	24	Jim Ingles
WR	25	Terry Moreland
RB	31	Mike Wiscombe	Sr
WR	37	Kelly Cooke
RB	40	Randy Peterson	So
RB		Steve Ball
WR, TE	45	Jim Wilund	Jr
C	50	Ken Muhlbeier	So
LG	51	John Durhan	Sr
OL	52	Larry Bosma	So
OL	54	John Davis
OL	59	Daryl Hanauer	So
OL	68	Jim Wymer	Sr
RT	70	Richard Beaver	Jr
OL	72	Bob Myklebust
RG	73	Faustin Riley	Jr
OL	74	Dave Crnich	So
OL	75	Rich Kushlan	Jr
OL	76	Bill Fluke
LT	77	Bruce Langmade	Sr
OL	78	Andy Kupp	Jr
OL	79	Joe Kristoff
TE, P	80	Ron Davis (C)	Sr
TE	82	Darrell Burchfield	So
TE	86	Jerry Domzalski
WR	89	Jack Goddard	Jr

Defense

Pos.	#	Name	Class
S	12	John Hathaway	Jr
S	25	Randy Hall	Fr
S	26	Steve Holdren	Jr
CB	27	Pat Sprute	Jr
S	34	Bob Miller	Jr
DB, P	36	Kurt Karlsson
LB	38	Jesse Craig	Sr
CB	42	Kelly Courage	So
CB	44	Kirby Cook
LB	53	Rand Marquess	So
LB	55	Ron Roberts	Sr
DL	56	Mark Busch	So
DL	57	Steve Vest
LB	58	Ralph Sletager	So
LB	61	Ron Linehan	Jr
DL	62	Frank Shaner
DT	65	Bill Cady	Jr
NG	67	Steve Barker	Jr
DT	69	Brock Jackley	Sr
DT	71	Mike Newell	So
DE	81	Tom Jarman	Jr
DE	85	Rick Simmons
DL	87	Neil Stevens
DE	88	Tim Reese (C)	Sr
DL		Hank Boomer

Special teams

Pos.	#	Name	Class
PK	7	Ricardo Castillo	Jr

Head coach

- Don Robbins (1st year)

Coordinators/assistant coaches

- Bob Thompson (OC)
- Ray Fulton (DC)
- Keith Lincoln
- Ed Troxel

Legend

- (C) Team captain
- (S) Suspended
- (I) Ineligible
- Injured
- Redshirt

== All conference ==
Four Vandals were selected to the all-Big Sky team: wide receiver Terry Moreland, halfback Fred Riley, defensive end Tim Reese, and linebacker Ron Linehan, a repeat pick. No second team was selected.

== NFL draft ==
No Vandals were selected in the 1971 NFL draft, which lasted seventeen rounds (442 selections). Three juniors were selected in the 1972 NFL draft, also 17 rounds.

Player	Position	Round	Overall	Franchise
Fred Riley	WR	6th	146	Atlanta Falcons
Andy Kupp	G	10th	241	New Orleans Saints
Ron Linehan	LB	17th	428	Pittsburgh Steelers
