= 1970 Northern Arizona Lumberjacks football team =

American college football season

1970 Northern Arizona Lumberjacks football
- Conference: Big Sky Conference
- Record: 2–8 (0–4 Big Sky)
- Head coach: John Symank (2nd season)
- Defensive coordinator: C. O. Brocato (2nd season)
- Home stadium: Lumberjack Stadium

1970 Big Sky Conference football standings
	Conf.					Overall
Team	W		L		T	W		L		T
Montana $	5	–	0	–	0	10	–	1	–	0
Idaho State	3	–	2	–	0	5	–	5	–	0
Boise State	2	–	2	–	0	8	–	3	–	0
Weber State	3	–	3	–	0	5	–	5	–	1
Idaho	2	–	2	–	0	4	–	7	–	0
Montana State	1	–	5	–	0	2	–	8	–	0
Northern Arizona	0	–	4	–	0	2	–	8	–	0
$ – Conference champion; Boise State's game against Long Beach State and Northern Arizona's game against New Mexico State counted in the conference standings.

The 1970 Northern Arizona Lumberjacks football team represented Northern Arizona University as a member of the Big Sky Conference during the 1970 NCAA College Division football season. Led by second-year head coach John Symank, the Lumberjacks compiled an overall record of 2–8 with a mark of 0–4 in conference play, placing last out of seven teams in the Big Sky.

== Schedule ==
Date	Opponent	Rank	Site	Result	Attendance	Source
September 12	Quantico Marines*		Lumberjack Stadium; Flagstaff, AZ	W 25–3	6,730	
September 19	Cal State Los Angeles*		Lumberjack Stadium; Flagstaff, AZ	W 33–0	2,700–6,500	
September 26	No. 2 Montana	No. 11	Lumberjack Stadium; Flagstaff, AZ	L 0–20	7,100–8,500	
October 3	at New Mexico Highlands*		Perkins Stadium; Las Vegas, NM	L 7–47	4,150	
October 10	at New Mexico State (Note: Northern Arizona's game against New Mexico State counted in the Big Sky standings.)		Memorial Stadium; Las Cruces, NM	L 13–57	7,655	
October 17	Drake*		Lumberjack Stadium; Flagstaff, AZ	L 17–31	8,120	
October 25	at Montana State		Gatton Field; Bozeman, MT	L 8–28	6,500	
October 31	Weber State		Lumberjack Stadium; Flagstaff, AZ	L 6–38	5,725	
November 7	at Eastern New Mexico*		Greyhound Stadium; Portales, NM	L 7–21	4,000	
November 14	Fresno State*		Lumberjack Stadium; Flagstaff, AZ	L 7–40	6,500–6,523	
*Non-conference game; Rankings from AP Poll released prior to the game
