= Leon Burns =

American football player (1942–1984)

No. 38
- Position: Running back

Personal information
- Born: September 15, 1942; Oakland, California, U.S.
- Died: December 22, 1984 (aged 42); Los Angeles, California, U.S.
- Listed height: 6 ft 2 in (1.88 m)
- Listed weight: 228 lb (103 kg)

Career information
- High school: Saint Mary's (CA)
- College: Long Beach State
- NFL draft: 1971: 1st round, 13th overall pick

Career history
- San Diego Chargers (1971); St. Louis Cardinals (1972)

Awards and highlights
- First-team All-American (1970); 2× First-team Little All-American (1969, 1970)

Career NFL statistics
- Rushing yards: 292
- Rushing touchdowns: 3
- Receptions: 9
- Receiving yards: 46
- Stats at Pro Football Reference

Leon Keith Burns (September 15, 1942 – December 22, 1984) was an American professional football player who was a running back for two years in the National Football League (NFL). After attending Laney College and California State University, Long Beach, he was selected in the first round of the 1971 NFL draft by the San Diego Chargers. Burns later played for the St. Louis Cardinals, as well as the Portland Storm of the World Football League (WFL).

In 1969, while playing for Long Beach State, Burns led all college football players in rushing yards and rushing touchdowns. He was named an All-American in 1970. Burns holds the school records for career carries, rushing yards, points, and touchdowns of the now defunct Long Beach State 49ers football program.

== Early life ==
Burns was born in 1942 and grew up on the west side of Oakland, California. After graduating high school, he worked as a janitor, delivery boy, and construction worker. Before turning 19, Burns was involved in the robbery of a pawn shop and was sentenced to a prison term of which he served four years, although he maintained that his involvement was limited to giving the other two people involved a ride.

== College career ==
Burns was first noticed in 1965 by Don Kloppenburg, the football coach at Laney College, when he brought his team to San Quentin Prison to play a game against a team of inmates, one of whom was Burns. After his release, Burns joined the Laney College football team and played there for two years. He transferred to Long Beach State in time for the 1969 season.

In 1969, Burns recorded the most rushing yards (1,659) and rushing touchdowns (26) of any college football player. He also caught ten passes for 149 yards and a touchdown as the Long Beach State 49ers finished second in their conference with a record of eight wins and three losses.

In the 1970 season, Burns did not have as much personal success due to early season ankle injuries, although he still gained over 1,000 rushing yards and scored 20 total touchdowns. However, Long Beach State finished the regular season with nine wins and two losses, making them conference co-champions with San Diego State. Since the 49ers had upset the Aztecs in a matchup on November 20, Long Beach State qualified for the 1970 Pasadena Bowl, where they played the Louisville Cardinals. Burns ran for three touchdowns in the game, which ended in a 24-24 tie.

In his two years at Long Beach State, Burns set school records for career carries, rushing yards, touchdowns, and points scored. He was elected to the 1970 College Football All-America Team by Pro Football Weekly and the Newspaper Enterprise Association. He was one of three Long Beach State players named first-team All-American (along with Terry Metcalf and Billy Parks) and became one of two to be selected in the 1st round of the NFL draft (along with Dan Bunz).

== Professional career ==
=== 1971 ===
Burns was selected by the San Diego Chargers in the first round (13th overall) of the 1971 NFL draft. At 29 years of age, he was unusually old for a rookie. During the 1971 season, Burns played in 14 games for the Chargers, starting four, and carried the ball 61 times for 223 yards and a touchdown, adding three receptions for 22 yards.

=== 1972 ===
On January 31, 1972, a day before the 1972 NFL draft, Burns was traded to the St. Louis Cardinals in exchange for running back Cid Edwards. In 1972 with the Cardinals, Burns ran for 69 yards and two touchdowns on 26 attempts and caught six passes for 24 yards. This was his last season in the NFL.

=== 1974 ===
Burns was signed by the Portland Storm of the World Football League (WFL) in 1974. He rushed for 193 yards on 51 carries. This was the last year Burns played professionally.

== Personal life ==
While attending Long Beach State, Burns was a political science major and expressed a desire to become a lawyer.

Burns married his wife, Diane, and had three children with her prior to being drafted into the NFL.

In addition to football, Burns was interested in weightlifting.

== Death and legacy ==
Burns was shot to death in southeast Los Angeles on December 22, 1984. His murder remains unsolved.

In 1987, he was inducted into the Long Beach State Hall of Fame.

== See also ==
- List of NCAA major college football yearly rushing leaders
- List of unsolved murders (1980–1999)
