= 1970 Idaho State Bengals football team =

American college football season

1970 Idaho State Bengals football
- Conference: Big Sky Conference
- Record: 5–5 (3–2 Big Sky)
- Head coach: Ed Cavanaugh (3rd season)
- Home stadium: ASISU Minidome

1970 Big Sky Conference football standings
	Conf.					Overall
Team	W		L		T	W		L		T
Montana $	5	–	0	–	0	10	–	1	–	0
Idaho State	3	–	2	–	0	5	–	5	–	0
Boise State	2	–	2	–	0	8	–	3	–	0
Weber State	3	–	3	–	0	5	–	5	–	1
Idaho	2	–	2	–	0	4	–	7	–	0
Montana State	1	–	5	–	0	2	–	8	–	0
Northern Arizona	0	–	4	–	0	2	–	8	–	0
$ – Conference champion; Boise State's game against Long Beach State and Northern Arizona's game against New Mexico State counted in the conference standings.

The 1970 Idaho State Bengals football team represented Idaho State University as a member of the Big Sky Conference during the 1970 NCAA College Division football season. Led by third-year head coach Ed Cavanaugh, the Bengals compiled an overall record of 5–5 with a mark of 3–2 in conference play, placing second in the Big Sky.

== Schedule ==
Date	Opponent	Site	Result	Attendance	Source
September 12	at Drake*	Drake Stadium; Des Moines, IA	L 10–39	11,000	
September 19	at Tulsa*	Skelly Stadium; Tulsa, OK	L 13–38	15,250	
September 26	UNLV*	ASISU Minidome; Pocatello, ID	W 64–34	10,400	
October 3	Idaho	ASISU Minidome; Pocatello, ID (rivalry)	W 35–14	12,500	
October 10	at Montana State	Gatton Field; Bozeman, MT	W 24–21	5,500	
October 17	No. 2 Montana	ASISU Minidome; Pocatello, ID	L 34–35	12,200–12,300	
October 24	at Weber State	Wildcat Stadium; Ogden, UT	W 30–14	6,472	
October 31	No. 15 Boise State	ASISU Minidome; Pocatello, ID	L 3–24	12,400	
November 7	Portland State*	ASISU Minidome; Pocatello, ID	W 37–6	8,400	
November 14	at No. 3 Tampa*	Tampa Stadium; Tampa, FL	L 7–68	20,238	
*Non-conference game; Rankings from AP Poll released prior to the game
