= 1970 Chico State Wildcats football team =

American college football season

1970 Chico State Wildcats football

FWC co-champion
- Conference: Far Western Conference
- Record: 8–3 (3–1 FWC)
- Head coach: Pete Riehlman (3rd season)
- Home stadium: College Field

1970 Far Western Conference football standings
	Conf.					Overall
Team	W		L		T	W		L		T
Chico State +	3	–	1	–	0	8	–	3	–	0
Cal State Hayward +	3	–	1	–	0	7	–	4	–	0
UC Davis	2	–	2	–	0	6	–	4	–	0
Humboldt State	2	–	2	–	0	5	–	5	–	0
San Francisco State	0	–	4	–	0	0	–	9	–	1
Sonoma State *	0	–	0	–	0	4	–	4	–	1
Sacramento State *	0	–	0	–	0	4	–	6	–	0
+ – Conference co-champions; * – ineligible for conference championship

The 1970 Chico State Wildcats football team represented Chico State College—now known as California State University, Chico—as a member of the Far Western Conference (FWC) during the 1970 NCAA College Division football season. Led by third-year head coach Pete Riehlman, Chico State compiled an overall record of 8–3 with a mark of 3–1 in conference play, sharing the FWC title with Cal State Hayward. The team outscored its opponents 334 to 189 for the season. The Wildcats played home games at College Field in Chico, California.

== Schedule ==
Date	Opponent	Site	Result	Attendance	Source
September 11	at Boise State*	Bronco Stadium; Boise, ID	L 14–49	14,028	
September 19	Oregon Tech*	College Field; Chico, CA	W 49–14	7,200	
September 26	at Southern Oregon*	Fuller Field; Ashland, OR	W 12–6	5,000	
October 3	United States International*	College Field; Chico, CA	L 0–3	7,000	
October 10	at San Francisco*	Kezar Stadium; San Francisco, CA	W 24–15	3,000	
October 17	Cal State Hayward	College Field; Chico, CA	L 22–43	8,300–8,750	
October 24	at Sacramento State*	Hornet Stadium; Sacramento, CA	W 28–21	4,000–4,022	
October 31	at Humboldt State	Redwood Bowl; Arcata, CA	W 34–0	6,000	
November 7	UC Davis	College Field; Chico, CA	W 21–14	9,500	
November 14	at San Francisco State	Cox Stadium; San Francisco, CA	W 55–10	1,000–1,500	
November 21	Sonoma State*	College Field; Chico, CA	W 75–14	5,800	
*Non-conference game
