= 1970 Boise State Broncos football team =

American college football season

1970 Boise State Broncos football
- Conference: Big Sky Conference
- Record: 8–3 (2–2 Big Sky)
- Head coach: Tony Knap (3rd season)
- Home stadium: Bronco Stadium

1970 Big Sky Conference football standings
	Conf.					Overall
Team	W		L		T	W		L		T
Montana $	5	–	0	–	0	10	–	1	–	0
Idaho State	3	–	2	–	0	5	–	5	–	0
Boise State	2	–	2	–	0	8	–	3	–	0
Weber State	3	–	3	–	0	5	–	5	–	1
Idaho	2	–	2	–	0	4	–	7	–	0
Montana State	1	–	5	–	0	2	–	8	–	0
Northern Arizona	0	–	4	–	0	2	–	8	–	0
$ – Conference champion; Boise State's game against Long Beach State and Northern Arizona's game against New Mexico State counted in the conference standings.

The 1970 Boise State Broncos football team represented Boise State College—now known as Boise State University—as a member of the Big Sky Conference during the 1970 NCAA College Division football season. This was the third season of Boise State Broncos football at the four-year level and the first for the program as a member of the Big Sky and the National Collegiate Athletic Association (NCAA). Led by third-year head coach Tony Knap, the Broncos were compiled an overall record of 8–3 with a mark of 2–2 in conference play, placing in a three-way tie for third in the Big Sky. Boise State played home games at the new Bronco Stadium, located on campus in Boise, Idaho.

== Schedule ==
Date	Time	Opponent	Rank	Site	Result	Attendance	Source
September 11	8:00 pm	Chico State*		Bronco Stadium; Boise, ID	W 49–14	14,028	
September 19	8:00 pm	Eastern Montana*		Bronco Stadium; Boise, ID	W 35–0	7,115	
September 26	1:30 pm	Central Washington*		Bronco Stadium; Boise, ID	W 34–20	7,416	
October 3	2:00 pm	at Montana State	No. 20	Gatton Field; Bozeman, MT	W 17–10	7,500	
October 10		at Long Beach State (Note: Boise State's game against Long Beach State counted in the Big Sky standings.)	No. 12	Veterans Memorial Stadium; Long Beach, CA	L 14–27	6,472	
October 17	8:00 pm	Southern Oregon*		Bronco Stadium; Boise, ID	W 57–0	5,976	
October 24	1:30 pm	Eastern Washington*^{†}	No. 17	Bronco Stadium; Boise, ID	W 12–0	4,866	
October 31	8:00 pm	at Idaho State	No. 15	ASISU Minidome; Pocatello, ID	W 24–3	12,400	
November 7		at Hiram Scott*	No. 19	Scottsbluff, NE	L 3–7	3,300	
November 14	1:30 pm	Weber State		Bronco Stadium; Boise, ID	L 7–41	11,865	
November 21	2:00 pm	at College of Idaho*		Simplot Stadium; Caldwell, ID	W 41–7	1,300	
*Non-conference game; ^{†}Homecoming; Rankings from AP Poll released prior to the game; All times are in Mountain time

== NFL draft ==
One Bronco was selected in the 1971 NFL draft, which lasted 17 rounds (442 selections).

Player	Position	Round	Overall	Franchise
Faddie Tillman	Defensive tackle	10th	241	Atlanta Falcons
