= List of Cal State Los Angeles Diablos head football coaches =

The Cal State Los Angeles Diablos college football team represented California State University, Los Angeles from 1951 to 1977. The Diablos competed in the National Collegiate Athletic Association (NCAA) College Division

The program had seven different head coaches in its 27 seasons of existence, including one who had multiple tenures as coach. The Diablos compiled an all time record of 102 wins, 139 losses, and 9 ties.

== Key ==
Key to symbols in coaches list
General		Overall		Conference		Postseason (Note: Although the first Rose Bowl Game was played in 1902, it has been continuously played since the 1916 game, and is recognized as the oldest bowl game by the NCAA. "—" indicates any season prior to 1916 when postseason games were not played.)	
No.	Order of coaches (Note: A running total of the number of head coaches, with coaches who served separate tenures being counted only once. Interim head coaches are represented with "Int" and are not counted in the running total. "—" indicates the team played but either without a coach or no coach is on record. "X" indicates an interim year without play.)	GC	Games coached	CW	Conference wins	PW	Postseason wins
DC	Division championships	OW	Overall wins	CL	Conference losses	PL	Postseason losses
CC	Conference championships	OL	Overall losses	CT	Conference ties	PT	Postseason ties
NC	National championships	OT	Overall ties (Note: Overtime rules in college football were introduced in 1996, making ties impossible in the period since.)	C%	Conference winning percentage		
†	Elected to the College Football Hall of Fame	O%	Overall winning percentage (Note: When computing the win–loss percentage, a tie counts as half a win and half a loss.)				

== Coaches ==
List of head football coaches showing season(s) coached, overall records, conference records, postseason records, and championships.
No.	Name	Season(s)	GC	OW	OL	OT	O%	CW	CL	CT	C%	PW	PL	PT	CCs	NCs
1	Leonard Adams	1951–1962	107	41	61	5	0.407	11	32	3	0.272	—	—	—	0	0
2	Homer Beatty	1963–1965	27	25	2	0	0.926	13	1	0	0.929	1	0	0	3	1 – 1964
3	Jim Williams	1966–1968; 1974–1975	48	17	29	2	0.375	4	17	1	0.205	0	0	0	0	0
4	Walter Thurmond	1969	9	0	9	0	.000	0	4	0	.000	0	0	0	0	0
5	Bob Enger	1970	10	1	9	0	0.100	0	4	0	.000	0	0	0	0	0
6	Foster Andersen	1971–1973	31	9	21	1	0.306	0	3	0	.000	0	0	0	0	0
7	Ron Hull	1976–1977	18	9	8	1	0.528	0	1	0	.000	0	0	0	—	0
