= List of UC Santa Barbara Gauchos football head coaches =

The UC Santa Barbara Gauchos college football team represented University of California, Santa Barbara. The Gauchos competed in the California Collegiate Athletic Association (CCAA) from 1939 to 1962. In 1969, the team moved to the NCAA University Division, but dropped football after the 1971 season. A student-run team was fielded in 1984 and 1985, and then an NCAA Division III team was fielded from 1986 to 1991.

The program had 13 head coaches in its 55 years of existence, including one who had two tenures. The team played as a student-run "club team" from 1983 to 1985, and games from those years do not count as official NCAA games.

== Coaches ==
No.	Coach	Tenure	Seasons	Win	Loss	Tie	Pct.	Bowls	Ref
1	J. C. Lewis	1921	1	0	2	0	.000	0	
2	Otho J. Gilliland	1922–1926	4	4	9	1	.321	0	
3	Dudley DeGroot	1926–1929	3	8	16	0	.333	0	
4	Harold Davis	1929–1933	6	18	29	3	.390	0	
5	Spud Harder	1933–1940	7	33	27	6	.545	0	
6	Stan Williamson (totals included on line 9)	1941–1949							
7	Roy Engle	1949–1951	3	14	14	0	.500	0	
8	Stan Williamson	1952–1956	8	32	38	3	.459	1	
9	Ed Cody	1956–1959	4	21	16	1	.566	1	
10	Bill Hammer	1960–1962	3	6	21	1	.232	0	
11	Jack Curtice	1962–1970	8	39	39	1	.500	2	
12	Andy Everest	1970–1971	1	5	17	0	.227	0	
13	Club team with Sut Puailoa and Mike Moropoulos	1983–1985	2	7	6	0	.538	0	
14	Mike Warren	1986–1989	4	26	13	0	.667	0	
15	Rick Candaele	1989–1991	3	18	9	0	.667	0	
	Totals	1921–1991	57	231	256	16	.475	4	
