= Clovis Swinney =

American football player (1945–2019)

No. 79
- Position: Defensive tackle

Personal information
- Born: August 17, 1945; Mexico, Missouri, U.S.
- Died: July 3, 2019 (aged 73); Jonesboro, Arkansas, U.S.
- Listed height: 6 ft 3 in (1.91 m)
- Listed weight: 249 lb (113 kg)

Career information
- High school: Jonesboro (Jonesboro, AR)
- College: Arkansas, Arkansas State
- NFL draft: 1970: 3rd round, 62nd overall pick

Career history
- New Orleans Saints (1970); New York Jets (1971)

Awards and highlights
- First-team Little All-American (1969)

Career NFL statistics
- Fumble recoveries: 1
- Games played: 18
- Games started: 1
- Stats at Pro Football Reference

Clovis Swinney (August 17, 1945 – July 3, 2019) was an American professional football defensive tackle. He played for the New Orleans Saints in 1970 and for the New York Jets in 1971.
