= 1970 South Dakota Coyotes football team =

American college football season

1970 South Dakota Coyotes football
- Conference: North Central Conference
- Record: 4–4–2 (3–2–1 NCC)
- Head coach: Joe Salem (5th season)
- Home stadium: Inman Field

1970 North Central Conference football standings
	Conf.					Overall
Team	W		L		T	W		L		T
No. 3 North Dakota State $	6	–	0	–	0	9	–	0	–	1
North Dakota	4	–	1	–	1	5	–	3	–	1
South Dakota	3	–	2	–	1	4	–	4	–	2
Augustana (SD)	3	–	3	–	0	4	–	6	–	0
Morningside	2	–	4	–	0	3	–	5	–	0
Northern Iowa	1	–	5	–	0	2	–	8	–	0
South Dakota State	1	–	5	–	0	2	–	8	–	0
$ – Conference champion; Rankings from AP small college poll

The 1970 South Dakota Coyotes football team was an American football team that represented the University of South Dakota in the North Central Conference (NCC) during the 1970 NCAA College Division football season. In its fifth season under head coach Joe Salem, the team compiled a 4–4–2 record (3–2–1 against NCC opponents), finished in third place out of seven teams in the NCC, and outscored opponents by a total of 290 to 227. The team played its home games at Inman Field in Vermillion, South Dakota.

Running back Steve Pelot received first-team honors on the 1970 Little All-America college football team.

== Schedule ==
Date	Time	Opponent	Site	Result	Attendance	Source
September 12		Nebraska–Omaha*	Inman Field; Vermillion, SD	W 53–28	9,500	
September 19		at North Dakota	Memorial Stadium; Grand Forks, ND (Sitting Bull Trophy)	T 14–14	7,500	
September 26		No. 4 North Dakota State	Inman Field; Vermillion, SD	L 21–24	9,800	
October 3	1:30 p.m.	Northern Iowa	Inman Field; Vermillion, SD	W 41–7	8,000	
October 10		South Dakota State	Inman Field; Vermillion, SD (rivalry)	W 26–0	10,500	
October 24	1:30 p.m.	No. 2 Montana*	Inman Field; Vermillion, SD	L 7–35	7,200–7,500	
October 31		at Augustana (SD)	Howard Wood Field; Sioux Falls, SD	W 52–23	1,500	
November 7		at Drake*	Drake Stadium; Des Moines, IA	L 28–37	10,700	
November 14		at Morningside	Sioux City, IA	L 27–28	3,000	
November 21		at Weber State*	Wildcat Stadium; Ogden, UT	T 21–21	3,742	
*Non-conference game; Rankings from AP Poll released prior to the game; All times are in Central time
