= 1970 Montana State Bobcats football team =

American college football season

1970 Montana State Bobcats football
- Conference: Big Sky Conference
- Record: 2–8 (1–5 Big Sky)
- Head coach: Tom Parac (3rd season)
- Home stadium: Gatton Field

1970 Big Sky Conference football standings
	Conf.					Overall
Team	W		L		T	W		L		T
Montana $	5	–	0	–	0	10	–	1	–	0
Idaho State	3	–	2	–	0	5	–	5	–	0
Boise State	2	–	2	–	0	8	–	3	–	0
Weber State	3	–	3	–	0	5	–	5	–	1
Idaho	2	–	2	–	0	4	–	7	–	0
Montana State	1	–	5	–	0	2	–	8	–	0
Northern Arizona	0	–	4	–	0	2	–	8	–	0
$ – Conference champion; Boise State's game against Long Beach State and Northern Arizona's game against New Mexico State counted in the conference standings.

The 1970 Montana State Bobcats football team was an American football team that represented Montana State University as a member of the Big Sky Conference during the 1970 NCAA College Division football season. In their third and final season under head coach Tom Parac, the Bobcats compiled an overall record of 2–8 record with a mark of 1–5 against conference opponents, placing sixth in the Big Sky.

Defensive end Gary Gustafson received second-team honors on the 1970 Little All-America college football team.

== Schedule ==
Date	Time	Opponent	Site	Result	Attendance	Source
September 12	8:00 p.m.	vs. Long Beach State*	Memorial Stadium; Great Falls, MT	L 3–19	6,000–6,100	
September 19		North Dakota State*	Gatton Field; Bozeman, MT	L 8–30	6,000	
September 26		at Fresno State*	Ratcliffe Stadium; Fresno, CA	W 26–12	9,044–10,000	
October 3		No. 20 Boise State	Gatton Field; Bozeman, MT	L 10–17	7,500	
October 10		Idaho State	Gatton Field; Bozeman, MT	L 21–24	5,500	
October 17		at Weber State	Wildcat Stadium; Ogden, UT	L 13–56	5,900	
October 24		Northern Arizona	Gatton Field; Bozeman, MT	W 28–8	6,500	
October 31		Idaho	Gatton Field; Bozeman, MT	L 24–37	4,500	
November 7		at No. 2 Montana	Dornblaser Field; Missoula, MT (rivalry)	L 0–35	12,300–12,500	
November 14		at UNLV*	Butcher Field; Las Vegas, NV	L 36–38	2,700–3,000	
*Non-conference game; Rankings from AP Poll released prior to the game; All times are in Mountain time
