= 1970 Northern Iowa Panthers football team =

American college football season

1970 Northern Iowa Panthers football
- Conference: North Central Conference
- Record: 2–8 (1–5 NCC)
- Head coach: Stan Sheriff (11th season)
- Offensive coordinator: Larry Thompson (1st season)
- Defensive coordinator: Dennis Remmert
- Home stadium: O. R. Latham Stadium

1970 North Central Conference football standings
	Conf.					Overall
Team	W		L		T	W		L		T
No. 3 North Dakota State $	6	–	0	–	0	9	–	0	–	1
North Dakota	4	–	1	–	1	5	–	3	–	1
South Dakota	3	–	2	–	1	4	–	4	–	2
Augustana (SD)	3	–	3	–	0	4	–	6	–	0
Morningside	2	–	4	–	0	3	–	5	–	0
Northern Iowa	1	–	5	–	0	2	–	8	–	0
South Dakota State	1	–	5	–	0	2	–	8	–	0
$ – Conference champion; Rankings from AP small college poll

The 1970 Northern Iowa Panthers football team was an American football team that represented the University of Northern Iowa as a member of the North Central Conference (NCC) during the 1970 NCAA College Division football season. In its 11th season under head coach Stan Sheriff, the team compiled a 2–8 record (1–5 in conference games) and tied for last place in the NCC.

Middle guard Doug Walter was the only Northern Iowa player named to the 1970 all-NCC team. The team's statistical leaders included senior quarterback Gary Weber with 578 passing yards, junior split end Larry Skartvedt with 488 receiving yards, senior fullback Roger Jones with 404 rushing yards, and junior tackle Gene Dietrich with 31 points scored on 10 extra points and seven field goals. Mike Woodley set a school record that still stands as of 2026 with 20 interceptions.

The team played its home games at O. R. Latham Stadium in Cedar Falls, Iowa.

== Schedule ==
Date	Time	Opponent	Site	Result	Attendance	Source
September 12	7:30 p.m.	Northern Michigan*	O. R. Latham Stadium; Cedar Falls, IA	L 0–21	6,886	
September 19	12:30 p.m.	at Central Michigan*	Alumni Field; Mount Pleasant, MI	L 9–27	9,000	
September 26	7:30 p.m.	South Dakota State	O. R. Latham Stadium; Cedar Falls, IA	W 24–8	5,533	
October 3	1:30 p.m.	at South Dakota	Inman Field; Vermillion, SD	L 17–41	8,000	
October 10	1:30 p.m.	Drake*	O. R. Latham Stadium; Cedar Falls, IA	W 13–0	5,784	
October 17	1:30 p.m.	Morningside	O. R. Latham Stadium; Cedar Falls, IA	L 7–19	7,822	
October 24	1:30 p.m.	No. 6 North Dakota State	O. R. Latham Stadium; Cedar Falls, IA	L 10–43	6,520	
October 31	1:30 p.m.	at North Dakota	Memorial Stadium; Grand Forks, ND	L 6–41	1,000	
November 7	1:30 p.m.	at Augustana (SD)	Sioux Falls, SD	L 10–20		
November 14	2:00 p.m.	at Western Illinois*	Hanson Field; Macomb, IL	L 7–29		
*Non-conference game; Rankings from AP Poll released prior to the game; All times are in Central time
