= 1970 San Jose State Spartans football team =

American college football season

1970 San Jose State Spartans football
- Conference: Pacific Coast Athletic Association
- Record: 2–9 (2–3 PCAA)
- Head coach: Joe McMullen (2nd season; first 3 games); Dewey King (1st season; final 8 games)
- Home stadium: Spartan Stadium

1970 Pacific Coast Athletic Association football standings
	Conf.					Overall
Team	W		L		T	W		L		T
San Diego State +	5	–	1	–	0	9	–	2	–	0
Long Beach State +	5	–	1	–	0	9	–	2	–	1
Fresno State	4	–	2	–	0	8	–	4	–	0
Pacific (CA)	2	–	3	–	0	5	–	6	–	0
San Jose State	2	–	3	–	0	2	–	9	–	0
UC Santa Barbara	1	–	5	–	0	2	–	9	–	0
Cal State Los Angeles	0	–	4	–	0	1	–	9	–	0
+ – Conference co-champions

The 1970 San Jose State Spartans football team represented San Jose State College (Note: San Jose State University was known as San Jose State College from 1935 to 1971.) during the 1970 NCAA University Division football season as a member of the Pacific Coast Athletic Association. (Note: The Big West Conference was known as the Pacific Coast Athletic Association from its founding in 1969 through 1987.) The team was led by head coach Joe McMullen for only the first three games of the 1970 season. He was replaced by Dewey King as of the fourth game of the season. They played home games at Spartan Stadium in San Jose, California. They finished the season with a record of two wins and nine losses (2–9, 2–3 PCAA).

== Schedule ==
Date	Time	Opponent	Site	Result	Attendance	Source
September 12	8:00 p.m.	UC Santa Barbara	Spartan Stadium; San Jose, CA	W 28–14	17,700	
September 19	1:35 p.m.	at No. 4 Stanford*	Stanford Stadium; Stanford, CA (rivalry)	L 3–34	46,000	
September 26	6:30 p.m.	at Arizona*	Arizona Stadium; Tucson, AZ	L 29–30	38,800	
October 3	8:00 p.m.	Long Beach State	Spartan Stadium; San Jose, CA	L 3–7	10,100–10,400	
October 10		at New Mexico*	University Stadium; Albuquerque, NM	L 25–48	15,759	
October 17	8:05 p.m.	at San Diego State	San Diego Stadium; San Diego, CA	L 6–32	28,216	
October 24	7:30 p.m.	at Pacific (CA)	Pacific Memorial Stadium; Stockton, CA (Victory Bell)	W 48–7	10,400	
October 31		Utah*^{†}	Spartan Stadium; San Jose, CA	L 9–13	10,000–10,100	
November 7	7:00 p.m.	at No. 12 Arizona State*	Sun Devil Stadium; Tempe, AZ	L 10–46	40,009	
November 14	1:27 p.m.	at California*	California Memorial Stadium; Berkeley, CA	L 28–35	16,841–18,842	
November 21	1:00 p.m.	Fresno State	Spartan Stadium; San Jose, CA (rivalry)	L 19–27	6,000	
*Non-conference game; ^{†}Homecoming; Rankings from AP Poll released prior to the game

== Team players in the NFL ==
No San Jose State players were selected in the 1971 NFL draft.
