= 1970 UC Riverside Highlanders football team =

American college football season

1970 UC Riverside Highlanders football
- Conference: California Collegiate Athletic Association
- Record: 4–6 (0–2 CCAA)
- Head coach: Gary Knecht (1st season)
- Home stadium: Highlander Stadium

1970 California Collegiate Athletic Association football standings
	Conf.					Overall
Team	W		L		T	W		L		T
No. 20 Cal Poly $	3	–	0	–	0	8	–	2	–	0
Cal State Fullerton	3	–	1	–	0	6	–	4	–	1
Valley State	1	–	2	–	0	4	–	6	–	0
Cal Poly Pomona	1	–	3	–	0	5	–	5	–	0
UC Riverside	0	–	2	–	0	4	–	6	–	0
$ – Conference champion; Rankings from UPI small college poll

The 1970 UC Riverside Highlanders football team represented the University of California, Riverside as a member of the California Collegiate Athletic Association (CCAA) during the 1970 NCAA College Division football season. Led by first-year head coach Gary Knecht, UC Riverside compiled an overall record of 4–6 with a mark of record of 0–2 in conference play, placing last out of five teams in the CCAA. The team was outscored by its opponents 306 to 192 for the season. The Highlanders played home games at Highlander Stadium in Riverside, California.

== Schedule ==
Date	Opponent	Site	Result	Attendance	Source
September 19	Sonoma State*	Highlander Stadium; Riverside, CA	W 14–7	1,500	
September 26	at Nevada*	Mackay Stadium; Reno, NV	L 26–45	4,000	
October 3	at Cal State Hayward*	Pioneer Stadium; Hayward, CA	L 12–62	3,650–4,000	
October 10	UNLV*	Highlander Stadium; Riverside, CA	W 21–19	2,000–2,500	
October 17	at Redlands*	Redlands Stadium; Redlands, CA	L 20–48	1,200	
October 24	at Cal Poly Pomona	Kellogg Field; Pomona, CA	L 34–36	2,000–2,300	
October 31	at United States International*	Balboa Stadium; San Diego, CA	L 16–30	1,300–4,000	
November 7	Cal State Fullerton	Highlander Stadium; Riverside, CA	L 6–38	3,000–3,500	
November 14	Occidental*	Highlander Stadium; Riverside, CA	W 22–14	1,200–1,500	
November 21	San Francisco*	Highlander Stadium; Riverside, CA	W 21–7	1,500–3,600	
*Non-conference game
