= 1970 North Dakota Fighting Sioux football team =

American college football season

1970 North Dakota Fighting Sioux football
- Conference: North Central Conference
- Record: 5–3–1 (5–1–1 NCC)
- Head coach: Jerry Olson (3rd season)
- Home stadium: Memorial Stadium

1970 North Central Conference football standings
	Conf.					Overall
Team	W		L		T	W		L		T
No. 3 North Dakota State $	6	–	0	–	0	9	–	0	–	1
North Dakota	4	–	1	–	1	5	–	3	–	1
South Dakota	3	–	2	–	1	4	–	4	–	2
Augustana (SD)	3	–	3	–	0	4	–	6	–	0
Morningside	2	–	4	–	0	3	–	5	–	0
Northern Iowa	1	–	5	–	0	2	–	8	–	0
South Dakota State	1	–	5	–	0	2	–	8	–	0
$ – Conference champion; Rankings from AP small college poll

The 1970 North Dakota Fighting Sioux football team, also known as the Nodaks, was an American football team that represented the University of North Dakota in the North Central Conference (NCC) during the 1970 NCAA College Division football season. In its third year under head coach Jerry Olson, the team compiled a 5–3–1 record (5–1–1 against NCC opponents), finished in second place out of seven teams in the NCC, and outscored opponents by a total of 202 to 138.

Linebacker Don McLean received second-team honors on the 1970 Little All-America college football team.

The team played its home games at Memorial Stadium in Grand Forks, North Dakota.

== Schedule ==
Date	Time	Opponent	Site	Result	Attendance	Source
September 12		at Montana*	Daylis Stadium; Billings, MT	L 7–28	6,500–7,000	
September 19		South Dakota	Memorial Stadium; Grand Forks, ND (Sitting Bull Trophy)	T 14–14	7,500	
September 26		Mankato State	Memorial Stadium; Grand Forks, ND	W 35–19	7,500	
October 3		at Augustana (SD)	Howard Wood Field; Sioux Falls, SD	W 18–7	7,000	
October 10		at South Dakota State	Coughlin–Alumni Stadium; Brookings, SD	W 36–3	10,000	
October 17		No. 3 North Dakota State	Memorial Stadium; Grand Forks, ND (Nickel Trophy)	L 3–20	12,600	
October 24		at Morningside	Sioux City, IA	W 30–8	4,000	
October 31	1:30 p.m.	Northern Iowa	Memorial Stadium; Grand Forks, ND	W 41–6	1,000	
November 7		No. 1 Arkansas State*	Kays Stadium; Jonesboro, AR	L 18–23	10,200–10,400	
*Non-conference game; Rankings from AP Poll released prior to the game; All times are in Central time
