= 1970 San Francisco State Gators football team =

American college football season

1970 San Francisco State Gators football
- Conference: Far Western Conference
- Record: 0–9–1 (0–4 FWC)
- Head coach: Vic Rowen (10th season)
- Offensive coordinator: Dick Logan (1st season)
- Home stadium: Cox Stadium

1970 Far Western Conference football standings
	Conf.					Overall
Team	W		L		T	W		L		T
Chico State +	3	–	1	–	0	8	–	3	–	0
Cal State Hayward +	3	–	1	–	0	7	–	4	–	0
UC Davis	2	–	2	–	0	6	–	4	–	0
Humboldt State	2	–	2	–	0	5	–	5	–	0
San Francisco State	0	–	4	–	0	0	–	9	–	1
Sonoma State *	0	–	0	–	0	4	–	4	–	1
Sacramento State *	0	–	0	–	0	4	–	6	–	0
+ – Conference co-champions; * – ineligible for conference championship

The 1970 San Francisco State Gators football team represented San Francisco State College—now known as San Francisco State University—as a member of the Far Western Conference (FWC) during the 1970 NCAA College Division football season. Led by tenth-year head coach Vic Rowen, San Francisco State compiled an overall record of 0–9–1 with a mark of 0–4 in conference play, placing last out of the five championship-eligible teams in the FWC. For the season the team was outscored by its opponents 372 to 99. The Gators played home games at Cox Stadium in San Francisco.

== Schedule ==
Date	Opponent	Site	Result	Attendance	Source
September 19	at Santa Clara*	Buck Shaw Stadium; Santa Clara, CA	L 13–33	8,743	
September 26	United States International*	Cox Stadium; San Francisco, CA	L 14–33	1,000	
October 3	at No. 18 Cal Poly*	Mustang Stadium; San Luis Obispo, CA	L 6–62	6,740	
October 10	Sacramento State*	Cox Stadium; San Francisco, CA	L 0–27	1,100–2,500	
October 17	at Humboldt State	Redwood Bowl; Arcata, CA	L 7–17	6,500	
October 24	UC Davis	Cox Stadium; San Francisco, CA	L 9–13	1,500	
October 31	at Sonoma State*	Bailey Field; Santa Rosa, CA	T 20–20	1,000	
November 7	at Central Washington*	Tomlinson Stadium; Ellensburg, WA	L 20–40	5,000	
November 14	Chico State	Cox Stadium; San Francisco, CA	L 10–55	1,000–1,500	
November 21	at Cal State Hayward	Pioneer Stadium; Hayward, CA	L 0–72	3,100–5,000	
*Non-conference game; Rankings from UPI Poll released prior to the game
