= 1970 Cal State Fullerton Titans football team =

American college football season

1970 Cal State Fullerton Titans football
- Conference: California Collegiate Athletic Association
- Record: 6–4–1 (3–1 CCAA)
- Head coach: Dick Coury (1st season)
- Home stadium: Anaheim Stadium

1970 California Collegiate Athletic Association football standings
	Conf.					Overall
Team	W		L		T	W		L		T
No. 20 Cal Poly $	3	–	0	–	0	8	–	2	–	0
Cal State Fullerton	3	–	1	–	0	6	–	4	–	1
Valley State	1	–	2	–	0	4	–	6	–	0
Cal Poly Pomona	1	–	3	–	0	5	–	5	–	0
UC Riverside	0	–	2	–	0	4	–	6	–	0
$ – Conference champion; Rankings from UPI small college poll

The 1970 Cal State Fullerton Titans football team represented California State College at Fullerton—now known as California State University, Fullerton—as a member of the California Collegiate Athletic Association (CCAA) during the 1970 NCAA College Division football season. Led by first-year head coach Dick Coury, Cal State Fullerton compiled an overall record of 6–4–1 with a mark of 3–1 in conference play, placing second in the CCAA. The Titans played home games at Anaheim Stadium in Anaheim, California.

== Schedule ==
Date	Opponent	Site	Result	Attendance	Source
September 19	at Cal Poly Pomona	Kellogg Field; Pomona, CA	W 31–0	3,400–4,500	
September 26	at Southern Utah State*	Eccles Coliseum; Cedar City, UT	W 17–7	1,000	
October 2	Cal Lutheran*	Anaheim Stadium; Anaheim, CA	T 0–0	6,000–6,003	
October 10	at Cal State Los Angeles*	East Los Angeles College Stadium; Monterey Park, CA	W 17–0	2,500–4,000	
October 17	at Valley State	Birmingham High School; Van Nuys, CA	W 33–25	3,000	
October 22	UNLV*	Anaheim Stadium; Anaheim, CA	L 10–20	5,300–5,331	
October 29	Whittier*	Anaheim Stadium; Anaheim, CA	W 24–10	4,473–4,800	
November 7	at UC Riverside	Highlander Stadium; Riverside, CA	W 38–6	3,000–3,500	
November 12	Cal Poly	Anaheim Stadium; Anaheim, CA	L 18–28	11,205	
November 19	United States International*	Anaheim Stadium; Anaheim, CA	L 14–17	3,099–3,700	
November 28	at Grambling*	Grambling Stadium; Grambling, LA	L 31–34	1,000	
*Non-conference game
