= Larry Schreiber =

American football player (born 1947)

No. 35, 36
- Position: Running back

Personal information
- Born: August 11, 1947 (age 79); Covington, Kentucky, U.S.
- Listed height: 6 ft 0 in (1.83 m)
- Listed weight: 210 lb (95 kg)

Career information
- High school: Dixie Heights (Edgewood, Kentucky)
- College: Tennessee Tech
- NFL draft: 1970: 10th round, 243rd overall pick

Career history
- San Francisco 49ers (1971–1975); Chicago Bears (1976)

Awards and highlights
- First-team Little All-American (1969)

Career NFL statistics
- Rushing attempts: 506
- Rushing yards: 1,749
- Rushing TDs: 10
- Receptions: 117
- Receiving yards: 982
- Receiving TDs: 4
- Stats at Pro Football Reference

Lawrence Anthony Schreiber (born August 11, 1947) is an American former professional football player who was a running back for six seasons for the San Francisco 49ers and the Chicago Bears of the National Football League (NFL).

== Biography ==
Larry Schreiber played college football for the Tennessee Tech Golden Eagles, and in 1969 was named Ohio Valley Conference offensive player of the year. Over his four varsity seasons he amassed a total of 4421 yards. He was drafted 243rd overall in the tenth round by the San Francisco 49ers for the 1971 season.

== NFL career statistics ==
Legend
**Bold**	Career high

=== Regular season ===
Year	Team	Games		Rushing					Receiving				
Year	Team	GP	GS	Att	Yds	Avg	Lng	TD	Rec	Yds	Avg	Lng	TD
1971	SFO	**14**	0	34	180	**5.3**	**23**	0	3	79	**26.3**	46	**1**
1972	SFO	**14**	3	118	420	3.6	20	2	31	283	9.1	**64**	**1**
1973	SFO	4	4	42	163	3.9	13	0	12	98	8.2	31	0
1974	SFO	**14**	**14**	**174**	**634**	3.6	21	3	30	217	7.2	16	**1**
1975	SFO	**14**	**14**	134	337	2.5	15	**5**	**40**	**289**	7.2	20	**1**
1976	CHI	**14**	0	4	15	3.8	11	0	1	16	16.0	16	0
		74	35	506	1,749	3.5	23	10	117	982	8.4	64	4

=== Playoffs ===
Year	Team	Games		Rushing					Receiving				
Year	Team	GP	GS	Att	Yds	Avg	Lng	TD	Rec	Yds	Avg	Lng	TD
1971	SFO	**2**	0	4	7	1.8	3	0	1	**22**	**22.0**	**22**	0
1972	SFO	1	**1**	**26**	**52**	**2.0**	**6**	**3**	**3**	20	6.7	8	0
		3	1	30	59	2.0	6	3	4	42	10.5	22	0
