= 1970 Cal Poly Pomona Broncos football team =

American college football season

1970 Cal Poly Pomona Broncos football
- Conference: California Collegiate Athletic Association
- Record: 5–5 (1–3 CCAA)
- Head coach: Roy Anderson (2nd season)
- Home stadium: Kellogg Field

1970 California Collegiate Athletic Association football standings
	Conf.					Overall
Team	W		L		T	W		L		T
No. 20 Cal Poly $	3	–	0	–	0	8	–	2	–	0
Cal State Fullerton	3	–	1	–	0	6	–	4	–	1
Valley State	1	–	2	–	0	4	–	6	–	0
Cal Poly Pomona	1	–	3	–	0	5	–	5	–	0
UC Riverside	0	–	2	–	0	4	–	6	–	0
$ – Conference champion; Rankings from UPI small college poll

The 1970 Cal Poly Pomona Broncos football team represented California State Polytechnic College, Kellogg-Voorhis—now known as California State Polytechnic University, Pomona—as a member of the California Collegiate Athletic Association (CCAA) during the 1970 NCAA College Division football season. Led by second-year head coach Roy Anderson, Cal Poly Pomona compiled an overall record of 5–5 with a mark of 1–3 in conference play, placing fourth in the CCAA. The team was outscored by its opponents 245 to 162 for the season. The Broncos played home games at Kellogg Field in Pomona, California.

== Schedule ==
Date	Opponent	Site	Result	Attendance	Source
September 19	Cal State Fullerton	Kellogg Field; Pomona, CA	L 0–31	3,400–4,500	
September 26	at Sacramento State*	Hornet Stadium; Sacramento, CA	W 19–14	4,000–5,000	
October 3	Cal State Los Angeles*	Kellogg Field; Pomona, CA	W 17–7	2,500	
October 10	at Hawaii*	Honolulu Stadium; Honolulu, HI	L 10–39	16,410	
October 17	San Diego*	San Diego, CA	W 18–13	800–1,000	
October 24	UC Riverside	Kellogg Field; Pomona, CA	W 36–34	2,000	
October 31	Saint Mary’s*	Moraga, CA	W 20–7	2,500	
November 7	Valley State	Kellogg Field; Pomona, CA	L 14–20	2,500	
November 14	Santa Clara*	Kellogg Field; Pomona, CA	L 14–39	2,000	
November 26	Cal Poly	Kellogg Field; Pomona, CA	L 14–41	2,000–2,200	
*Non-conference game
