= 1970 North Dakota State Bison football team =

American college football season

1970 North Dakota State Bison football

NCC champion

Camellia Bowl, W 31–16 vs. Montana
- Conference: North Central Conference
- Record: 9–0–1 (6–0 NCC)
- Head coach: Ron Erhardt (5th season)
- Captain: Joe Cichy
- Home stadium: Dacotah Field

1970 North Central Conference football standings
	Conf.					Overall
Team	W		L		T	W		L		T
No. 3 North Dakota State $	6	–	0	–	0	9	–	0	–	1
North Dakota	4	–	1	–	1	5	–	3	–	1
South Dakota	3	–	2	–	1	4	–	4	–	2
Augustana (SD)	3	–	3	–	0	4	–	6	–	0
Morningside	2	–	4	–	0	3	–	5	–	0
Northern Iowa	1	–	5	–	0	2	–	8	–	0
South Dakota State	1	–	5	–	0	2	–	8	–	0
$ – Conference champion; Rankings from AP small college poll

The 1970 North Dakota State Bison football team was an American football team that represented North Dakota State University during the 1970 NCAA College Division football season as a member of the North Central Conference. In their fifth year under head coach Ron Erhardt, the team compiled a 9–0–1 record, finished as NCC champion, and defeated Montana in the Camellia Bowl.

Defensive back Joe Cichy received first-team honors on the 1970 Little All-America college football team, and tackle Dan Green received third-team honors.

== Schedule ==
Date	Time	Opponent	Rank	Site	Result	Attendance	Source
September 12		Eastern Michigan*		Dacotah Field; Fargo, ND	T 14–14	10,500	
September 19		at Montana State*		Gatton Field; Bozeman, MT	W 30–8	6,000	
September 26		at South Dakota	No. 4	Inman Field; Vermillion, SD	W 24–21	9,800	
October 3		Morningside	No. 5	Dacotah Field; Fargo, ND	W 55–7		
October 10		Augustana (SD)^{†}	No. 4	Dacotah Field; Fargo, ND	W 45–7		
October 17		at North Dakota	No. 3	Memorial Stadium; Grand Forks, ND (Nickel Trophy)	W 20–3	12,600	
October 24	1:30 p.m.	at Northern Iowa	No. 6	O. R. Latham Stadium; Cedar Falls, IA	W 43–10	6,520	
October 31		South Dakota State	No. 4	Dacotah Field; Fargo, ND (rivalry)	W 35–0		
November 7		Mankato State*	No. 3	Dacotah Field; Fargo, ND	W 61–21		
December 12		vs. No. 2 Montana*	No. 3	Charles C. Hughes Stadium; Sacramento, CA (Camellia Bowl)	W 31–16	13,177	
*Non-conference game; ^{†}Homecoming; Rankings from AP Poll released prior to the game; All times are in Central time
