= 1970 Cal State Hayward Pioneers football team =

American college football season

1970 Cal State Hayward Pioneers football

FWC co-champion
- Conference: Far Western Conference
- Record: 7–4 (3–1 FWC)
- Head coach: Les Davis (5th season)
- Defensive coordinator: Tim Tierney (1st season)
- Home stadium: Pioneer Stadium

1970 Far Western Conference football standings
	Conf.					Overall
Team	W		L		T	W		L		T
Chico State +	3	–	1	–	0	8	–	3	–	0
Cal State Hayward +	3	–	1	–	0	7	–	4	–	0
UC Davis	2	–	2	–	0	6	–	4	–	0
Humboldt State	2	–	2	–	0	5	–	5	–	0
San Francisco State	0	–	4	–	0	0	–	9	–	1
Sonoma State *	0	–	0	–	0	4	–	4	–	1
Sacramento State *	0	–	0	–	0	4	–	6	–	0
+ – Conference co-champions; * – ineligible for conference championship

The 1970 Cal State Hayward Pioneers football team represented California State College at Hayward—now known as California State University, East Bay—as a member of the Far Western Conference (FWC) during the 1970 NCAA College Division football season. Led by Les Davis in his fifth and final year as head coach, Cal State Hayward compiled an overall record of 7–4 with a mark of 3–1 in conference play, sharing the FWC title with Chico State. The team outscored its opponents 382 to 187 for the season. The Pioneers played home games at Pioneer Stadium in Hayward, California.

Davis resigned from his post at Cal State Hayward in February 1971 to become the head football coach at New Mexico Highlands University. In five years under Davis, the Pioneers won the conference title once (1969), shared the conference title once (1970) and finished with an overall record of 30–20–1, for a .598 winning percentage. Of the four coaches Cal State Hayward football had in its 29 years of existence, Davis is the only one finished his tenure with a winning record.

== Schedule ==
Date	Opponent	Site	Result	Attendance	Source
September 12	at Fresno State*	Ratcliffe Stadium; Fresno, CA	L 12–28	7,581–10,000	
September 19	Whittier*	Pioneer Stadium; Hayward, CA	L 14–15	2,300	
September 26	at Cal Poly*	Mustang Stadium; San Luis Obispo, CA	L 20–41	6,750–9,200	
October 3	UC Riverside*	Pioneer Stadium; Hayward, CA	W 62–12	3,650–4,000	
October 17	at Chico State	College Field; Chico, CA	W 43–22	8,300–8,750	
October 24	San Francisco*	Pioneer Stadium; Hayward, CA	W 58–0	2,750	
October 31	Sacramento State*	Pioneer Stadium; Hayward, CA	W 14–12	4,000–7,300	
November 7	at Humboldt State	Redwood Bowl; Arcata, CA	L 35–37	6,400	
November 14	at UC Davis	Toomey Field; Davis, CA	W 32–14	5,100–5,700	
November 21	San Francisco State	Pioneer Stadium; Hayward, CA	W 72–0	3,100–5,000	
November 28	vs. Southern*	Oakland–Alameda County Coliseum; Oakland, CA	W 20–6	24,092–24,105	
*Non-conference game
