= 1970 Cal Poly Mustangs football team =

American college football season

1970 Cal Poly Mustangs football

CCAA champion
- Conference: California Collegiate Athletic Association
- Record: 8–2 (3–0 CCAA)
- Head coach: Joe Harper (3rd season)
- Home stadium: Mustang Stadium

1970 California Collegiate Athletic Association football standings
| | Conf. | | | | | Overall |
| Team | W | | L | | T | W | | L | | T |
|---|---|---|---|---|---|---|---|---|---|---|
| No. 20 Cal Poly $ | 3 | – | 0 | – | 0 | 8 | – | 2 | – | 0 |
| Cal State Fullerton | 3 | – | 1 | – | 0 | 6 | – | 4 | – | 1 |
| Valley State | 1 | – | 2 | – | 0 | 4 | – | 6 | – | 0 |
| Cal Poly Pomona | 1 | – | 3 | – | 0 | 5 | – | 5 | – | 0 |
| UC Riverside | 0 | – | 2 | – | 0 | 4 | – | 6 | – | 0 |
$ – Conference champion; Rankings from UPI small college poll

The 1970 Cal Poly Mustangs football team represented California Polytechnic State College—now known as California Polytechnic State University, San Luis Obispo—as a member of the California Collegiate Athletic Association (CCAA) during the 1970 NCAA College Division football season. Led by third-year head coach Joe Harper, Cal Poly compiled an overall record of 8–2 with a mark of 3–0 in conference play, winning the CCAA title for the second consecutive season. The Mustangs played home games at Mustang Stadium in San Luis Obispo, California.

== Schedule ==
| Date | Opponent | Rank | Site | Result | Attendance | Source |
|---|---|---|---|---|---|---|
| September 19 | Cal Lutheran* | | Mustang Stadium; San Luis Obispo, CA | W 40–7 | 6,740–7,740 | |
| September 26 | Cal State Hayward* | | Mustang Stadium; San Luis Obispo, CA | W 41–20 | 6,750–9,200 | |
| October 3 | San Francisco State* | No. 18 | Mustang Stadium; San Luis Obispo, CA | W 62–6 | 6,740 | |
| October 10 | Nevada* | No. 12 | Mustang Stadium; San Luis Obispo, CA | W 35–0 | 6,910 | |
| October 17 | at No. 17 Fresno State* | No. 10 | Ratcliffe Stadium; Fresno, CA | L 17–23 | 12,060–12,297 | |
| October 24 | Valley State | No. 19 | Mustang Stadium; San Luis Obispo, CA | W 46–21 | 7,310 | |
| October 31 | at Long Beach State* | No. 19 | Veterans Stadium; Long Beach, California | L 20–49 | 5,724 | |
| November 12 | at Cal State Fullerton | | Anaheim Stadium; Anaheim, CA | W 28–18 | 11,205 | |
| November 21 | at UC Santa Barbara* | | Campus Stadium; Santa Barbara, CA | W 42–7 | 5,350 | |
| November 26 | at Cal Poly Pomona | | Kellogg Field; Pomona, CA | W 41–14 | 2,000–2,200 | |
*Non-conference game; Rankings from UPI Poll released prior to the game
