= 1970 UC Davis Aggies football team =

American college football season

1970 UC Davis Aggies football
- Conference: Far Western Conference
- Record: 6–4 (2–2 FWC)
- Head coach: Jim Sochor (1st season)
- Captains: Rudy Kadlub; Tom Odell
- Home stadium: Toomey Field

1970 Far Western Conference football standings
	Conf.					Overall
Team	W		L		T	W		L		T
Chico State +	3	–	1	–	0	8	–	3	–	0
Cal State Hayward +	3	–	1	–	0	7	–	4	–	0
UC Davis	2	–	2	–	0	6	–	4	–	0
Humboldt State	2	–	2	–	0	5	–	5	–	0
San Francisco State	0	–	4	–	0	0	–	9	–	1
Sonoma State *	0	–	0	–	0	4	–	4	–	1
Sacramento State *	0	–	0	–	0	4	–	6	–	0
+ – Conference co-champions; * – ineligible for conference championship

The 1970 UC Davis Aggies football team represented the University of California, Davis as a member of the Far Western Conference (FWC) during the 1970 NCAA College Division football season. Led by first-year head coach Jim Sochor, UC Davis compiled an overall record of 6–4 with a mark of 2–2 in conference play, tying for third place in the FWC. The team outscored its opponents 208 to 176 For the season. The Aggies played home games at Toomey Field in Davis, California.

== Schedule ==
Date	Opponent	Site	Result	Attendance	Source
September 19	at Occidental*	D.W. Patterson Field; Los Angeles, CA	L 6–20	1,000	
September 26	San Francisco*	Toomey Field; Davis, CA	W 24–14	5,000	
October 3	at Whittier*	Memorial Stadium; Whittier, CA	W 28–18	1,250	
October 10	Humboldt State	Toomey Field; Davis, CA	W 35–21	6,500	
October 17	Sonoma State*	Toomey Field; Davis, CA	L 11–24	4,900	
October 24	at San Francisco State	Cox Stadium; San Francisco, CA	W 13–9	1,500	
October 31	Nevada*	Toomey Field; Davis, CA	W 35–17	7,000	
November 7	at Chico State	College Field; Chico, CA	L 14–21	9.500	
November 14	Cal State Hayward	Toomey Field; Davis, CA	L 14–32	5,100–5,700	
November 21	at Sacramento State*	Charles C. Hughes Stadium; Sacramento, CA (rivalry)	W 28–0	3,600–4,200	
*Non-conference game
