= 1969 Little All-America college football team =

American college football all-star team

The 1969 Little All-America college football team is composed of college football players from small colleges and universities who were selected by the Associated Press (AP) as the best players at each position. For 1969, the AP selected two teams, each team having separate offensive and defensive platoons.

Terry Bradshaw of Louisiana Tech was the first-team quarterback. During his time at Louisiana Tech, hew tallied 6,589 passing yards, the most ever by a quarterback at any Louisiana program. He was drafted by the Pittsburgh Steelers and led the club to four Super Bowl championships.

Halfback Larry Schreiber of Tennessee Tech was named to the first team and was also named Ohio Valley Conference Player of the Year. He rushed for 1,522 yards in 1969 and 4,421 during his collegiate career.

Leon Burns of Long Beach State was named to the first team as a fullback.

== First team ==
=== Offense ===
- Quarterback - Terry Bradshaw (senior, 6'3", 215 pounds), Louisiana Tech
- Halfback - Paul Hatchett (senior, 5'9", 185 pounds), North Dakota State
- Halfback - Larry Schreiber (senior, 6'0", 200 pounds), Tennessee Tech
- Fullback - Leon Burns (junior, 6'1", 228 pounds), Long Beach State
- End - Bruce Cerone (senior, 5'11", 193 pounds), Emporia State
- End - Richard McGeorge (senior, 6'4", 233 pounds), Elon
- Tackle - John Kohler (senior, 6'6", 255 pounds), South Dakota
- Tackle - Doug Wilkerson (senior, 6'3", 240 pounds), North Carolina Central
- Guard - Glenn Kidder (senior, 6'2," 230 pounds), McNeese State
- Guard - Joe Stephens (senior, 6'3", 255 pounds), Jackson State
- Center - Dan Buckley (senior, 6'0", 218 pounds), Arkansas State

=== Defense ===
- Defensive end - Harvey Adams (senior, 5'10", 205 pounds), Kings Point
- Defensive end - Joe Jones (senior, 6'6", 242 pounds), Tennessee State
- Defensive tackle - Dave Haverdick (senior, 6'2", 245 pounds), Morehead State
- Defensive tackle - Clovis Swinney (senior, 6'3", 238 pounds), Arkansas State
- Middle guard - Teddy Taylor (senior, 6'0", 195 pounds), Eastern Kentucky
- Linebacker - Chip Bennett (senior, 6'3", 230 pounds), Abilene Christian
- Linebacker - Glenn Lafleur (senior, 6'0", 195 pounds), Southwestern Louisiana
- Linebacker - Kevin Lee (senior, 5'11", 220 pounds), Willamette
- Defensive back - Merl Code (senior, 6'1", 200 pounds), North Carolina A&T
- Defensive back - David Hadley (senior, 5'10", 187 pounds), Alcorn A&M
- Defensive back - Bruce Taylor (senior, 5'11", 185 pounds), Boston University

== Second team ==
=== Offense ===
- Quarterback - Tom DiMuzio, Delaware
- Halfback - Arthur James, East Texas
- Halfback Frank Lewis, Grambling
- Fullback - Les Kent, Montana
- End - Eddie Bell, Idaho State
- End - Mike Carter, Sacramento State
- Tackle - Bill Crone, Loyola of Los Angeles
- Tackle - Tuufuli Uperesa, Montana
- Guard - Dave Kinkela, Puget Sound
- Guard - Tom Young, Wittenberg
- Center - Mark Maneval, Angelo State

=== Defense ===
- Defensive end - Lawrence Esters, Alcorn A&M
- Defensive end - Billy Newsome, Grambling
- Defensive tackle - Charles Blossom, Texas Southern
- Defensive tackle - Carter Campbell, Weber State
- Middle guard - Margarito Guerrero, Texas A&I
- Linebacker - Sidney Allred, Wofford
- Linebacker - Rayford Jenkins, Alcorn A&M
- Linebacker - Doug Linebarger, East Tennessee State
- Defensive back - Steve Krumrei, North Dakota
- Defensive back - Alvin Matthews, Texas A&I
- Defensive back - Steve Sweeters, Santa Clara

== See also ==
- 1969 College Football All-America Team
