= 1970 Cal State Los Angeles Diablos football team =

American college football season

1970 Cal State Los Angeles Diablos football
- Conference: Pacific Coast Athletic Association
- Record: 1–9 (0–4 PCAA)
- Head coach: Bob Enger (1st season)
- Home stadium: East Los Angeles College Stadium

1970 Pacific Coast Athletic Association football standings
| | Conf. | | | | | Overall |
| Team | W | | L | | T | W | | L | | T |
|---|---|---|---|---|---|---|---|---|---|---|
| San Diego State + | 5 | – | 1 | – | 0 | 9 | – | 2 | – | 0 |
| Long Beach State + | 5 | – | 1 | – | 0 | 9 | – | 2 | – | 1 |
| Fresno State | 4 | – | 2 | – | 0 | 8 | – | 4 | – | 0 |
| Pacific (CA) | 2 | – | 3 | – | 0 | 5 | – | 6 | – | 0 |
| San Jose State | 2 | – | 3 | – | 0 | 2 | – | 9 | – | 0 |
| UC Santa Barbara | 1 | – | 5 | – | 0 | 2 | – | 9 | – | 0 |
| Cal State Los Angeles | 0 | – | 4 | – | 0 | 1 | – | 9 | – | 0 |
+ – Conference co-champions

The 1970 Cal State Los Angeles Diablos football team represented California State College at Los Angeles—now known as California State University, Los Angeles—as a member of the Pacific Coast Athletic Association (PCAA) during the 1970 NCAA University Division football season. Led by Bob Enger in his first and only season as head coach, Cal State Los Angeles compiled an overall record of 1–9 with a mark of 0–4 in conference play, placing last out of seven teams in the PCAA. The Diablos were shut out three times and scored only 54 points for the season while allowing up 325. Cal State Los Angeles played home games at the East Los Angeles College Stadium in Monterey Park, California.

== Schedule ==
| Date | Opponent | Site | Result | Attendance | Source |
|---|---|---|---|---|---|
| September 19 | at Northern Arizona | Lumberjack Stadium; Flagstaff, AZ | L 0–33 | 2,700–6,500 | |
| September 26 | at San Diego State* | San Diego Stadium; San Diego, CA | L 13–14 | 34,717 | |
| October 3 | Cal Poly Pomona* | East Los Angeles College Stadium; Monterey Park, CA | L 14–20 | 1,545–2,500 | |
| October 10 | Cal State Fullerton | East Los Angeles College Stadium; Monterey Park, CA | L 0–17 | 2,500–4,000 | |
| October 17 | at UNLV* | Las Vegas Stadium; Whitney, NV | W 28–52 | 2,000–3,000 | |
| October 24 | at Fresno State | Ratcliffe Stadium; Fresno, CA | L 6–28 | 7,500–7,956 | |
| October 31 | at Hawaii | Honolulu Stadium; Honolulu, HI | L 0–42 | 10,109–10,121 | |
| November 7 | at UC Santa Barbara* | Campus Stadium; Santa Barbara, CA | L 6–36 | 5,000 | |
| November 12 | Long Beach State* | East Los Angeles College Stadium; Monterey Park, CA | L 7–40 | 1,446 | |
| November 21 | at Valley State* | Birmingham High School; Van Nuys, CA | L 0–45 | 2,500 | |
*Non-conference game
