= 1970 Sonoma State Cossacks football team =

American college football season

1970 Sonoma State Cossacks football
- Conference: Far Western Conference
- Record: 4–4–1 (0–0 FWC)
- Head coach: Carl Peterson (1st season)
- Home stadium: Bailey Field

1970 Far Western Conference football standings
	Conf.					Overall
Team	W		L		T	W		L		T
Chico State +	3	–	1	–	0	8	–	3	–	0
Cal State Hayward +	3	–	1	–	0	7	–	4	–	0
UC Davis	2	–	2	–	0	6	–	4	–	0
Humboldt State	2	–	2	–	0	5	–	5	–	0
San Francisco State	0	–	4	–	0	0	–	9	–	1
Sonoma State *	0	–	0	–	0	4	–	4	–	1
Sacramento State *	0	–	0	–	0	4	–	6	–	0
+ – Conference co-champions; * – ineligible for conference championship

The 1970 Sonoma State Cossacks football team represented Sonoma State College—now known as Sonoma State University—as a member of the Far Western Conference (FWC) during the 1970 NCAA College Division football season. This was first year that the school competed in college football as the varsity level. Led by first-year head coach Carl Peterson, Sonoma State compiled an overall record 4–4–1. The Cossacks were ineligible for the FWC title and their games did not count in the conference standings. The team was outscored by their opponents 210 to 157 for the season.

As Sonoma State's campus did not then have a stadium suitable for spectators, home games were played at Bailey Field at Santa Rosa Junior College in Santa Rosa, California.

== Schedule ==
Date	Opponent	Site	Result	Attendance	Source
September 19	at UC Riverside*	Highlander Stadium; Riverside, CA	L 7–14	1,500	
September 26	Saint Mary's*	Bailey Field; Santa Rosa, CA	L 7–13		
October 3	Azusa Pacific*	Bailey Field; Santa Rosa, CA	W 17–14		
October 17	at UC Davis*	Toomey Field; Davis, CA	W 24–11	4,900	
October 24	at Oregon Tech*	Klamath Falls, OR	W 21–20		
October 31	San Francisco State*	Bailey Field; Santa Rosa, CA	T 20–20	1,000	
November 7	at Cal Lutheran*	Mt. Clef Field; Thousand Oaks, CA	L 14–16		
November 14	San Francisco*	Bailey Field; Santa Rosa, CA	W 33–27		
November 21	at Chico State*	College Field; Chico, CA	L 14–75	5,800	
*Non-conference game
