= Joe Cichy =

American football player (born 1948)

Profile
- Position: Safety

Personal information
- Born: May 12, 1948 (age 78); Fargo, North Dakota, U.S.
- Listed height: 6 ft 1 in (1.85 m)
- Listed weight: 194 lb (88 kg)

Career information
- High school: Shanley (Fargo, North Dakota)
- College: North Dakota State (1968–1970)

Awards and highlights
- 2 × Small College National Champion (1968, 1969)
- College Football Hall of Fame

Joseph John Cichy (born May 12, 1948) (Note: The Philadelphia Eagle's 1971 media guide listed Cichy's year of birth as 1949.) is an American attorney and former gridiron football player. He played college football primarily as a safety for the North Dakota State Bison. He is an inductee of the College Football Hall of Fame.

== Biography ==
Cichy attended Shanley High School in his hometown of Fargo, North Dakota, where he was quarterback of the football team. He then attended North Dakota State University (NDSU). With the Bison football team, he was a backup quarterback in 1968 then a safety during the 1969 and 1970 seasons. The decision to move Cichy from quarterback to defensive back was made by Bison head coach Ron Erhardt following the loss of multiple defensive players from the 1968 team. The Bison were selected as small college national champions by the Associated Press for 1968 and 1969. (Note: The Bison also finished atop the UPI small college football rankings in 1969; they were ranked second by UPI in 1968.)

Cichy had 53 unassisted tackles during the 1969 season, setting an NDSU record that was not matched for 34 seasons. He was named to the College Division All-America first team as selected by the American Football Coaches Association for 1969, and as selected by the Associated Press for 1970. The Bison posted a record of 29–0–1 during his three seasons, and Cichy had completed his high-school career with a 25-game winning streak, resulting in a span of 55 games without a loss. He served as team captain for the 1970 Bison. In December 1970, Cichy was awarded a $1000 ($8,290 in 2025) post-graduate scholarship, awarded by the NCAA for "exceptional academic and athletic achievement." He graduated from NDSU in 1971 with a major in history and a minor in German.

Following his collegiate career, Cichy was unselected in the 1971 NFL draft, but was briefly with the Philadelphia Eagles during the offseason until being released in July 1971. He then returned to his high school, where his father was head football coach, and taught in the physical education department. In May 1973, he was hired by St. Mary's Central High School in Bismarck, North Dakota, to a similar role and to serve as head football coach. He coached there until resigning in April 1978 in order to attend law school.

By October 1981, Cichy had obtained a Juris Doctor degree from the University of North Dakota School of Law and was working for the North Dakota Water Commission as an assistant attorney general. He joined a private law firm in Bismarck in late 1985.

Cichy was elected to the College Football Hall of Fame in 1997. He was inducted to the athletic hall of fame at NDSU in 1981, joining his father, Sid, a 1973 inductee. Joe's brother Nick was also inducted in 1988. Another brother, Steve, played for Notre Dame; Steve's son Jack Cichy played in the National Football League (NFL) for the Tampa Bay Buccaneers. Joe Cichy was inducted to the hall of fame associated with his high school in 2017.

Cichy married Barbara Perry of Bismarck in June 1978. The couple had three daughters.
