= 1970 Fresno State Bulldogs football team =

American college football season

1970 Fresno State Bulldogs football
- Conference: Pacific Coast Athletic Association
- Record: 8–4 (4–2 CCAA)
- Head coach: Darryl Rogers (5th season)
- Defensive coordinator: Bob Padilla (3rd season)
- Home stadium: Ratcliffe Stadium

1970 Pacific Coast Athletic Association football standings
	Conf.					Overall
Team	W		L		T	W		L		T
San Diego State +	5	–	1	–	0	9	–	2	–	0
Long Beach State +	5	–	1	–	0	9	–	2	–	1
Fresno State	4	–	2	–	0	8	–	4	–	0
Pacific (CA)	2	–	3	–	0	5	–	6	–	0
San Jose State	2	–	3	–	0	2	–	9	–	0
UC Santa Barbara	1	–	5	–	0	2	–	9	–	0
Cal State Los Angeles	0	–	4	–	0	1	–	9	–	0
+ – Conference co-champions

The 1970 Fresno State Bulldogs football team represented Fresno State College—now known as California State University, Fresno—as a member of the Pacific Coast Athletic Association (PCAA) during the 1970 NCAA University Division football season. Led by fifth-year head coach Darryl Rogers, Fresno State compiled an overall record of 8–4 with a mark of 4–2 in conference play, placing third in the PCAA. The Bulldogs played their home games at Ratcliffe Stadium on the campus of Fresno City College in Fresno, California.

== Schedule ==
Date	Time	Opponent	Site	Result	Attendance	Source
September 12		Cal State Hayward*	Ratcliffe Stadium; Fresno, CA	W 28–12	11,000	
September 19		at UC Santa Barbara	Campus Stadium; Santa Barbara, CA	W 25–10	2,800	
September 26		Montana State*	Ratcliffe Stadium; Fresno, CA	L 12–26	9,044–10,000	
October 3	8:00 p.m.	Pacific (CA)	Ratcliffe Stadium; Fresno, CA	W 34–14	10,000	
October 10		Valley State*	Ratcliffe Stadium; Fresno, CA	W 21–7	6,522	
October 17		Cal Poly*	Ratcliffe Stadium; Fresno, CA	W 23–17	12,060–12,297	
October 24		Cal State Los Angeles	Ratcliffe Stadium; Fresno, CA	W 51–6	7,956	
October 31		at No. 17 San Diego State	San Diego Stadium; San Diego, CA (rivalry)	L 14–56	46,294	
November 7		Long Beach State	Ratcliffe Stadium; Fresno, CA	L 14–50	7,500–8,500	
November 14		at Northern Arizona*	Lumberjack Stadium; Flagstaff, AZ	W 40–7	6,500–6,523	
November 21	1:00 p.m.	at San Jose State	Spartan Stadium; San Jose, CA (rivalry)	W 27–19	6,000	
November 28		at Hawaii*	Honolulu Stadium; Honolulu, HI (rivalry)	L 0–49	9,319	
*Non-conference game; Rankings from AP Poll released prior to the game; All times are in Pacific time
