= 1970 Humboldt State Lumberjacks football team =

American college football season

1970 Humboldt State Lumberjacks football
- Conference: Far Western Conference
- Record: 5–5 (2–2 FWC)
- Head coach: Bud Van Deren (5th season)
- Home stadium: Redwood Bowl

1970 Far Western Conference football standings
	Conf.					Overall
Team	W		L		T	W		L		T
Chico State +	3	–	1	–	0	8	–	3	–	0
Cal State Hayward +	3	–	1	–	0	7	–	4	–	0
UC Davis	2	–	2	–	0	6	–	4	–	0
Humboldt State	2	–	2	–	0	5	–	5	–	0
San Francisco State	0	–	4	–	0	0	–	9	–	1
Sonoma State *	0	–	0	–	0	4	–	4	–	1
Sacramento State *	0	–	0	–	0	4	–	6	–	0
+ – Conference co-champions; * – ineligible for conference championship

The 1970 Humboldt State Lumberjacks football team represented the Humboldt State College—now known as California State Polytechnic University, Humboldt—as a member of the Far Western Conference (FWC) during the 1970 NCAA College Division football season. Led by fifth-year head coach Bud Van Deren, Humboldt State compiled an overall record of 5–5 with a mark of 2–2 in conference play, tying for third place in the FWC. For the season the team was outscored by its opponents 266 to 238. The Lumberjacks played home games at the Redwood Bowl in Arcata, California.

Tackle Len Gotshalk received third-team honors on the 1970 Little All-America college football team.

== Schedule ==
Date	Opponent	Site	Result	Attendance	Source
September 12	Humboldt State alumni*	Redwood Bowl; Arcata, CA	W 11–7		
September 19	Southern Oregon*	Redwood Bowl; Arcata, CA	W 38–3		
September 26	Lewis & Clark*	Redwood Bowl; Arcata, CA	W 27–0		
October 3	at Portland State*	Civic Stadium; Portland, OR	L 31–54		
October 10	at UC Davis	Toomey Field; Davis, CA	L 21–35	6,500	
October 17	San Francisco State	Redwood Bowl; Arcata, CA	W 17–7	6,500	
October 31	Chico State	Redwood Bowl; Arcata, CA	L 0–34	6,000	
November 7	Cal State Hayward	Redwood Bowl; Arcata, CA	W 37–35	6,400	
November 14	at Sacramento State*	Hornet Stadium; Sacramento, CA	L 15–30	3,000	
November 21	at Santa Clara*	Buck Shaw Stadium; Santa Clara, CA	L 41–61		
*Non-conference game

== Team players in the NFL ==
The following Humboldt State players were selected in the 1971 NFL draft.

Player	Position	Round	Overall	NFL team
Len Gotshalk	Tackle – Guard	8	186	Philadelphia Eagles
