= 1970 Valley State Matadors football team =

American college football season

1970 Valley State Matadors football
- Conference: California Collegiate Athletic Association
- Record: 4–6 (1–2 CCAA)
- Head coach: Leon McLaughlin (2nd season)
- Home stadium: Birmingham High School

1970 California Collegiate Athletic Association football standings
	Conf.					Overall
Team	W		L		T	W		L		T
No. 20 Cal Poly $	3	–	0	–	0	8	–	2	–	0
Cal State Fullerton	3	–	1	–	0	6	–	4	–	1
Valley State	1	–	2	–	0	4	–	6	–	0
Cal Poly Pomona	1	–	3	–	0	5	–	5	–	0
UC Riverside	0	–	2	–	0	4	–	6	–	0
$ – Conference champion; Rankings from UPI small college poll

The 1970 Valley State Matadors football team represented San Fernando Valley State College—now known as California State University, Northridge—as a member of the California Collegiate Athletic Association (CCAA) during the 1970 NCAA College Division football season. Led by Leon McLaughlin in his second and final season as head coach, Valley State compiled an overall record of 4–6 with a mark of 1–2 in conference play, placing third in the CCAA. The Matadors played home games at Birmingham High School in Van Nuys, California.

== Schedule ==
Date	Opponent	Site	Result	Attendance	Source
September 19	Sacramento State*	Birmingham High School; Van Nuys, California	W 34–10	4,000–5,000	
September 26	UC Santa Barbara*	Birmingham High School; Van Nuys, CA	W 13–7	3,800	
October 10	at Fresno State*	Ratcliffe Stadium; Fresno, CA	L 7–21	6,522	
October 17	Cal State Fullerton	Birmingham High School; Van Nuys, CA	L 25–33	3,000	
October 24	at Cal Poly	Mustang Stadium; San Luis Obispo, CA	L 21–46	7,310	
October 31	at New Mexico Highlands*	Perkins Stadium; Las Vegas, NM	L 13–34		
November 7	at Cal Poly Pomona	Kellogg Field; Pomona, CA	W 20–14	2,500	
November 14	at Nevada*	Mackay Stadium; Reno, NV	L 17–23	4,000–4,050	
November 21	Cal State Los Angeles*	Birmingham High School; Van Nuys, CA	W 45–0	2,500	
November 28	Long Beach State*	Birmingham High School; Van Nuys, CA	L 0–21	200–300	
*Non-conference game
