= 1970 Sacramento State Hornets football team =

American college football season

1970 Sacramento State Hornets football
- Conference: Far Western Conference
- Record: 4–6 (0–0 FWC)
- Head coach: Ray Clemons (10th season)
- Home stadium: Hornet Stadium

1970 Far Western Conference football standings
	Conf.					Overall
Team	W		L		T	W		L		T
Chico State +	3	–	1	–	0	8	–	3	–	0
Cal State Hayward +	3	–	1	–	0	7	–	4	–	0
UC Davis	2	–	2	–	0	6	–	4	–	0
Humboldt State	2	–	2	–	0	5	–	5	–	0
San Francisco State	0	–	4	–	0	0	–	9	–	1
Sonoma State *	0	–	0	–	0	4	–	4	–	1
Sacramento State *	0	–	0	–	0	4	–	6	–	0
+ – Conference co-champions; * – ineligible for conference championship

The 1970 Sacramento State Hornets football team represented Sacramento State College—now known as California State University, Sacramento—as a member of the Far Western Conference (FWC) during the 1970 NCAA College Division football season. Led by tenth-year head coach Ray Clemons, Sacramento State compiled an overall record of 4–6. The Hornets were ineligible for the FWC title and their games did not count in the conference standings. The team outscored its opponents 196 to 169 for the season. The Hornets played home games at Hornet Stadium in Sacramento, California.

== Schedule ==
Date	Opponent	Site	Result	Attendance	Source
September 19	at Valley State*	Birmingham High School; Van Nuys, CA	L 10–34	4,000–5,000	
September 26	Cal Poly Pomona*	Hornet Stadium; Sacramento, CA	L 14–19	4,000–5,000	
October 3	Puget Sound*	Hornet Stadium; Sacramento, CA	W 27–6	4,000	
October 10	at San Francisco State*	Cox Stadium; San Francisco, CA	W 27–0	2,500	
October 17	at Nevada*	Mackay Stadium; Reno, NV	L 14–18	2,500–4,000	
October 24	Chico State*	Hornet Stadium; Sacramento, CA	L 21–28	4,000–4,022	
October 31	at Cal State Hayward*	Pioneer Stadium; Hayward, CA	L 12–14	4,000–7,300	
November 7	at San Francisco*	Kezar Stadium; San Francisco, CA	W 41–7	4,000	
November 14	Humboldt State*	Hornet Stadium; Sacramento, CA	W 30–15	3,000	
November 21	UC Davis*	Hornet Stadium; Sacramento, CA (rivalry)	L 0–28	3,600–4,200	
*Non-conference game
