= 1970 Pacific Tigers football team =

American college football season

1970 Pacific Tigers football
- Conference: Pacific Coast Athletic Association
- Record: 5–6 (2–3 PCAA)
- Head coach: Homer Smith (1st season)
- Home stadium: Pacific Memorial Stadium

1970 Pacific Coast Athletic Association football standings
	Conf.					Overall
Team	W		L		T	W		L		T
San Diego State +	5	–	1	–	0	9	–	2	–	0
Long Beach State +	5	–	1	–	0	9	–	2	–	1
Fresno State	4	–	2	–	0	8	–	4	–	0
Pacific (CA)	2	–	3	–	0	5	–	6	–	0
San Jose State	2	–	3	–	0	2	–	9	–	0
UC Santa Barbara	1	–	5	–	0	2	–	9	–	0
Cal State Los Angeles	0	–	4	–	0	1	–	9	–	0
+ – Conference co-champions

The 1970 Pacific Tigers football team represented the University of the Pacific (UOP) as a member of the Pacific Coast Athletic Association (PCAA) during the 1970 NCAA University Division football season. Led by first-year head coach Homer Smith, the Tigers compiled an overall record of 5–6 with a mark of 2–3 in conference play, tying for fourth place in the PCAA, and were outscored by opponents 231 to 166. The team played home games at Pacific Memorial Stadium in Stockton, California.

Smith was hired by Pacific in March 1970.

== Schedule ==
Date	Time	Opponent	Site	Result	Attendance	Source
September 12		at UTEP*	Sun Bowl; El Paso, TX	W 24–18	23,450	
September 19	7:30 p.m.	Long Beach State	Pacific Memorial Stadium; Stockton, CA	W 9–6	15,840	
September 26	1:30 p.m.	at Idaho*	Rogers Field; Pullman, WA	W 17–10	8,600–10,000	
October 3	8:00 p.m.	at Fresno State	Ratcliffe Stadium; Fresno, CA	L 14–34	10,000	
October 10		at No. 19 LSU*	Tiger Stadium; Baton Rouge, LA	L 0–34	48,000	
October 17	2:00 p.m.	Santa Clara*^{†}	Pacific Memorial Stadium; Stockton, CA	W 47–23	16,100	
October 24	7:30 p.m.	San Jose State	Pacific Memorial Stadium; Stockton, CA (Victory Bell)	L 7–48	10,400	
October 31	8:00 p.m.	at UC Santa Barbara	Campus Stadium; Santa Barbara, CA	W 27–13	3,000	
November 7	7:30 p.m.	No. 14 San Diego State	Pacific Memorial Stadium; Stockton, CA	L 13–14	13,200–15,000	
November 14	12:30 p.m.	at Colorado State*	Hughes Stadium; Fort Collins, CO	L 8–17	19,758	
November 21	11:00 p.m.	at Hawaii*	Honolulu Stadium; Honolulu, HI	L 0–14	17,362	
*Non-conference game; ^{†}Homecoming; Rankings from AP Poll released prior to the game; All times are in Pacific time

== NFL draft ==
One Pacific Tiger was selected in the 1971 NFL draft.

Player	Position	Round	Overall	NFL team
Honor Jackson	Defensive back	9	233	Dallas Cowboys
