= Jack Cichy =

American football player (born 1996)

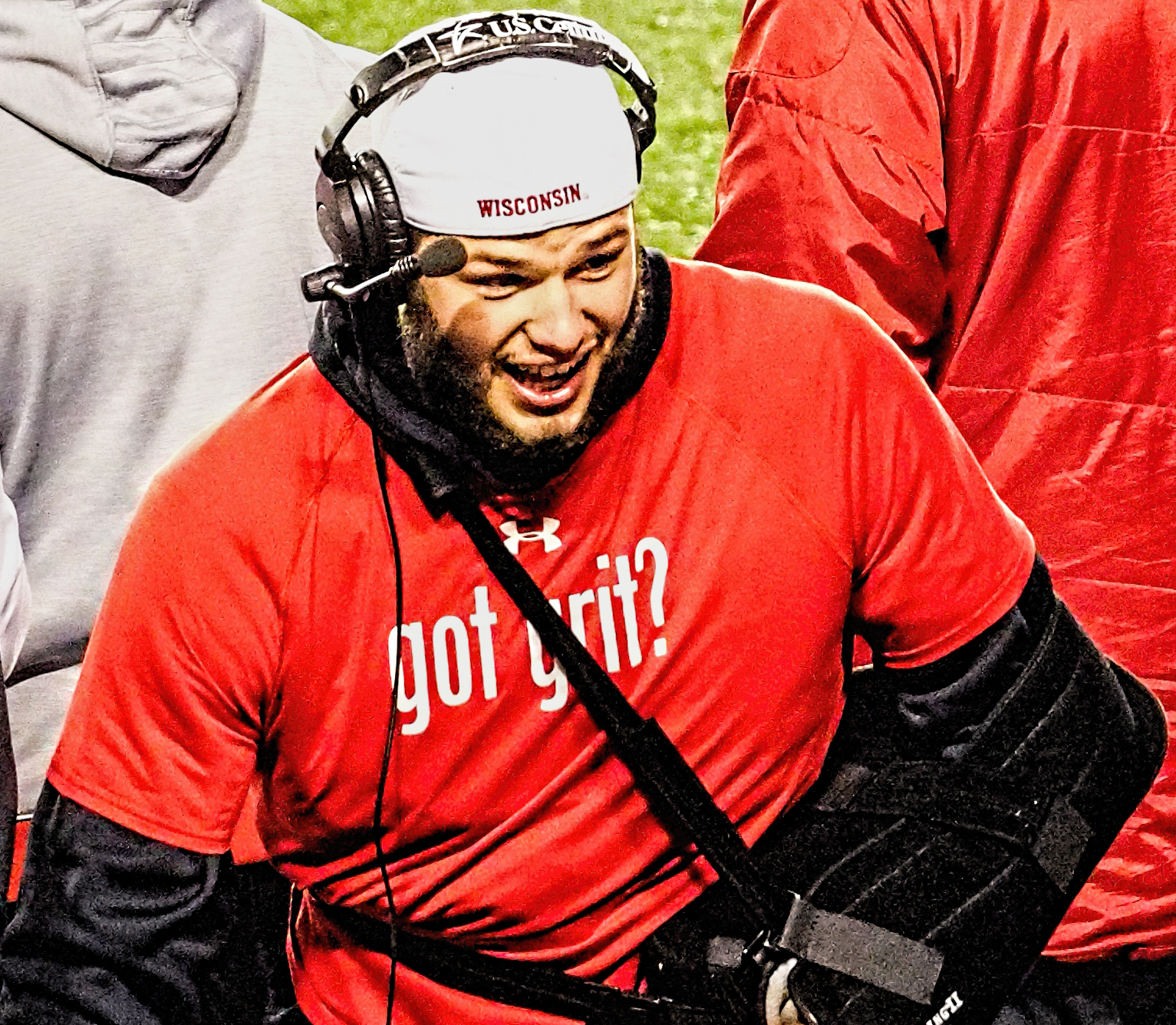
- Cichy with the Wisconsin Badgers in 2016

No. 48
- Position: Linebacker

Personal information
- Born: May 5, 1996 (age 30); Milwaukee, Wisconsin, U.S.
- Listed height: 6 ft 2 in (1.88 m)
- Listed weight: 234 lb (106 kg)

Career information
- High school: Hill-Murray School
- College: Wisconsin
- NFL draft: 2018: 6th round, 202nd overall pick

Career history

Playing
- Tampa Bay Buccaneers (2018–2020); New England Patriots (2020)*; Tampa Bay Buccaneers (2020)
- * Offseason or practice squad member only

Coaching
- Wisconsin (2022)

Awards and highlights
- Super Bowl champion (LV); Holiday Bowl defensive MVP (2015)

Career NFL statistics
- Total tackles: 6
- Stats at Pro Football Reference

Jack Cichy (born May 5, 1996) is an American former professional football player who was a linebacker in the National Football League (NFL). He played college football for the Wisconsin Badgers. He was selected by the Tampa Bay Buccaneers in the sixth round of the 2018 NFL draft.

== Early life ==
Cichy's father, Steve, played football for Notre Dame, and his uncle Joe Cichy is an inductee of the College Football Hall of Fame.

Playing for Wisconsin, Cichy recorded three consecutive sacks in the 2015 Holiday Bowl, a sequence that gained much notoriety. He was also named the bowl's defensive MVP.

== Professional career ==
=== Tampa Bay Buccaneers (first stint) ===
Cichy was selected by the Tampa Bay Buccaneers in sixth round with the 202nd overall pick in the 2018 NFL draft. The Buccaneers acquired the pick used to select Cichy by trading J. J. Wilcox to the Pittsburgh Steelers. He played in six games before suffering a torn ACL in Week 7, and was subsequently placed on injured reserve list on October 22, 2018.

In 2019, Cichy played in four games before injuring his elbow in Week 4. He missed the next four weeks and was placed on injured reserve on October 30, 2019.

On October 13, 2020, Cichy was placed on injured reserve after sustaining a hamstring injury in Week 5. He was activated on November 28. Cichy was waived by Tampa Bay on December 2.

=== New England Patriots ===
On December 3, 2020, Cichy was claimed off waivers by the New England Patriots. He was waived with a failed physical designation on December 9, and was re-signed to the practice squad two days later.

=== Tampa Bay Buccaneers (second stint) ===
On January 2, 2021, Cichy was signed by the Tampa Bay Buccaneers off the Patriots' practice squad. On January 19, Cichy was placed on injured reserve. Cichy earned a Super Bowl championship when the Buccaneers won Super Bowl LV.

After being in free agency for the entirety of the 2021 season, he announced his retirement on February 22, 2022.

== Coaching career ==
Cichy joined the University of Wisconsin staff as an offensive assistant in 2022 after volunteering during 2021.
