= 1970 UC Santa Barbara Gauchos football team =

American college football season

1970 UC Santa Barbara Gauchos football
- Conference: Pacific Coast Athletic Association
- Record: 2–9 (1–5 PCAA)
- Head coach: Andy Everest (2nd season)
- Offensive coordinator: Pete Kettela (1st season)
- Home stadium: Campus Stadium

1970 Pacific Coast Athletic Association football standings
	Conf.					Overall
Team	W		L		T	W		L		T
San Diego State +	5	–	1	–	0	9	–	2	–	0
Long Beach State +	5	–	1	–	0	9	–	2	–	1
Fresno State	4	–	2	–	0	8	–	4	–	0
Pacific (CA)	2	–	3	–	0	5	–	6	–	0
San Jose State	2	–	3	–	0	2	–	9	–	0
UC Santa Barbara	1	–	5	–	0	2	–	9	–	0
Cal State Los Angeles	0	–	4	–	0	1	–	9	–	0
+ – Conference co-champions

The 1970 UC Santa Barbara Gauchos football team represented the University of California, Santa Barbara (UCSB) as a member of the Pacific Coast Athletic Association (PCAA) during the 1970 NCAA University Division football season. Led by first-year head coach Andy Everest, the Gauchos compiled an overall record of 2–9 with a mark of 1–5 in conference play, placing sixth in the PCAA. The team played home games at Campus Stadium in Santa Barbara, California.

== Schedule ==
Date	Time	Opponent	Site	Result	Attendance	Source
September 12	8:00 p.m.	at San Jose State	Spartan Stadium; San Jose, CA	L 14–28	17,700	
September 19		Fresno State	Campus Stadium; Santa Barbara, CA	L 10–25	2,800	
September 26		at Valley State*	Birmingham High School; Van Nuys, CA	L 7–13	3,800	
October 3		at Texas Tech*	Jones Stadium; Lubbock, TX	L 21–63	34,000	
October 10		at Santa Clara*	Buck Shaw Stadium; Santa Clara, CA	L 10–14	7,734	
October 16		at Long Beach State	Veterans Memorial Stadium; Long Beach, CA	L 7–33	5,718	
October 24		Hawaii*	Campus Stadium; Santa Barbara, CA	W 22–20	5,000	
October 31	8:00 p.m.	Pacific (CA)	Campus Stadium; Santa Barbara, CA	L 13–27	3,000	
November 7		Cal State Los Angeles	Campus Stadium; Santa Barbara, CA	W 36–6	5,000	
November 14		at No. 14 San Diego State	San Diego Stadium; San Diego, CA	L 7–64	26,015	
November 21		Cal Poly*	Campus Stadium; Santa Barbara, CA	L 7–42	5,350	
*Non-conference game; Rankings from AP Poll released prior to the game; All times are in Pacific time
