= Faddie Tillman =

American football player (born 1948)

No. 71
- Position: Defensive lineman

Personal information
- Born: October 7, 1948 (age 78); Dallas, Texas, U.S.
- Listed height: 6 ft 5 in (1.96 m)
- Listed weight: 235 lb (107 kg)

Career information
- High school: Hamilton Park (Dallas)
- College: Boise State
- NFL draft: 1971: 10th round, 241st overall pick

Career history
- Atlanta Falcons (1971)*; New Orleans Saints (1972); Dallas Cowboys (1973)*
- * Offseason or practice squad member only
- Stats at Pro Football Reference

Faddie Charles Tillman (born October 7, 1948) is an American former professional football defensive lineman who played for the New Orleans Saints of the National Football League (NFL). He played college football for the Boise State Broncos and was selected by the Atlanta Falcons in the tenth round of the 1971 NFL draft.

== Early life ==
Faddie Charles Tillman was born on October 7, 1948, in Dallas, Texas. He attended Hamilton Park High School in Dallas.

== College career ==
Tillman played junior college football at Arizona Western College from 1966 to 1967 as an end. He transferred to Boise College, where he was a three-year letterman for the Boise State Broncos from 1968 to 1970 as a defensive end.

== Professional career ==
Tillman was selected by the Atlanta Falcons in the tenth round, with the 241st overall pick, of the 1971 NFL draft. In training camp with the Falcons, he was noted for his habit of catching his breath by holding his head high to "let more air through". He also sung "Popeye The Sailor Man" to the other players. Tillman was released on September 1, 1971, after the third preseason game. He then spent the 1971 season playing in the Atlantic Coast Football League with the Norfolk Neptunes and Roanoke Buckskins.

Tillman signed with the New Orleans Saints on February 16, 1972. He played in the regular season opener for the Saints in a reserve role before being waived on September 25, 1972.

Tillman was signed by the Dallas Cowboys in 1973. On August 15, he was hospitalized with nausea and cramps due to heat exhaustion. He was released on August 29, 1973.

== Personal life ==
Tillman retired as a supervisor for the Dallas County Juvenile Department.
