= 1970 San Diego State Aztecs football team =

American college football season

1970 San Diego State Aztecs football

PCAA co-champion
- Conference: Pacific Coast Athletic Association
- Record: 9–2 (5–1 PCAA)
- Head coach: Don Coryell (10th season)
- Offensive coordinator: Rod Dowhower (3rd season)
- Offensive scheme: Air Coryell
- Defensive coordinator: Claude Gilbert (2nd season)
- Base defense: 4–3
- Home stadium: San Diego Stadium

1970 Pacific Coast Athletic Association football standings
	Conf.					Overall
Team	W		L		T	W		L		T
San Diego State +	5	–	1	–	0	9	–	2	–	0
Long Beach State +	5	–	1	–	0	9	–	2	–	1
Fresno State	4	–	2	–	0	8	–	4	–	0
Pacific (CA)	2	–	3	–	0	5	–	6	–	0
San Jose State	2	–	3	–	0	2	–	9	–	0
UC Santa Barbara	1	–	5	–	0	2	–	9	–	0
Cal State Los Angeles	0	–	4	–	0	1	–	9	–	0
+ – Conference co-champions

The 1970 San Diego State Aztecs football team represented San Diego State College (Note: San Diego State University was known as San Diego State College from 1935 to 1971.) during the 1970 NCAA University Division football season as a member of the Pacific Coast Athletic Association. (Note: The Big West Conference was known as the Pacific Coast Athletic Association from its founding in 1969 through 1987.) The team was led by head coach Don Coryell, in his tenth year, and played home games at San Diego Stadium (Note: San Diego County Credit Union Stadium (SDCCU Stadium) was known as San Diego Stadium from its opening in 1967 through 1980.) in San Diego, California. They finished the season as co-champions of the conference, with a record of nine wins and two losses (9–2, 5–1 PCAA).

== Schedule ==
Date	Time	Opponent	Rank	Site	Result	Attendance	Source
September 12	5:30 p.m.	at Northern Illinois*		Huskie Stadium; DeKalb, IL	W 35–3	9,116	
September 19	5:30 p.m.	at North Texas State*		Fouts Field; Denton, TX	W 23–0	14,300	
September 26		Cal State Los Angeles		San Diego Stadium; San Diego, CA	W 35–0	34,717	
October 3		BYU*		San Diego Stadium; San Diego, CA	W 31–11	36,830	
October 10		Southern Miss*		San Diego Stadium; San Diego, CA	W 41–14	32,963	
October 17	8:05 p.m.	San Jose State		San Diego Stadium; San Diego, CA	W 32–6	28,216	
October 31		Fresno State	No. 14	San Diego Stadium; San Diego, CA (rivalry)	W 56–14	46,294	
November 7	7:30 p.m.	at Pacific (CA)	No. 14	Pacific Memorial Stadium; Stockton, CA	W 14–13	13,200–15,000	
November 14		UC Santa Barbara	No. 14	San Diego Stadium; San Diego	W 65–7	26,015	
November 20		at Long Beach State	No. 14	Anaheim Stadium; Anaheim, CA	L 11–27	39,005	
November 28	8:03 p.m.	Iowa State*		San Diego Stadium; San Diego, CA	L 22–28	31,810–40,172	
*Non-conference game; Rankings from AP Poll released prior to the game; All times are in Pacific time

== Team players in the NFL ==
The following were selected in the 1971 NFL draft.

Player	Position	Round	Overall	NFL team
Ken Burrow	Wide receiver	2	33	Atlanta Falcons
Henry Allison	Guard – Tackle	2	50	Philadelphia Eagles
Tom Shellabarger	Tackle	5	108	Philadelphia Eagles
Tom Hayes	Defensive back	6	137	Atlanta Falcons
Leon Van Gorkum	Defensive end	8	195	San Diego Chargers
Lindsey James	Running back	16	397	Atlanta Falcons

The following finished their SDSU career in 1970, were not drafted, but played in the NFL.

Player	Position	First NFL team
Terry Mendenhall	Linebacker	1971 Oakland Raiders

== Team awards ==
Award	Player
Most Valuable Player (John Simcox Memorial Trophy)	Tim Delaney
Outstanding Offensive & Defensive Linemen (Byron H. Chase Memorial Trophy)	Henry Allison, Off; Leon Van Gorkum, Def
Team captains Dr. R. Hardy / C.E. Peterson Memorial Trophy	Tim Delaney, Off; Leon Van Gorkum, Def
Most Inspirational Player	Tim Delaney, Terry Mendenhall
