= Bob Enger =

American football coach (born c. 1935)

Biographical details
- Born: c. 1935

Playing career
- 1955–1956: UCLA
- Positions: Quarterback, linebacker

Coaching career (HC unless noted)
- 1961: West Covina HS (CA)
- 1962–1964: Bell HS (CA)
- 1965–1966: East Los Angeles (backfield)
- 1967–1969: East Los Angeles
- 1970: Cal State Los Angeles
- 1982–1983: Cantwell HS (CA)
- 1988–1990: Pierce

Head coaching record
- Overall: 1–9 (college); 30–30 (junior college)
- Tournaments: 2–1 (California JC large division playoffs)

Accomplishments and honors

Championships
- 1 Metropolitan Conference (1968)

Bob Enger (born c. 1935) is an American former football coach. He is served as the head football coach at East Los Angeles College from 1967 to 1969, California State University, Los Angeles in 1970, and Los Angeles Pierce College from 1988 to 1990.

Enger played college football as a quarterback and linebacker at the University of California, Los Angeles (UCLA) under head coach Red Sanders. In 1962, he became the head football coach at Bell High School in Bell, California after working as an assistant under Mel Easton at West Covina High School in West Covina, California. He led his teams at Bell High School to a record of 18–7 in three seasons. Enger had a record of 21–9 in three seasons as head coach at East Los Angeles and guided his 1968 team to the California junior college large division championship game. He was the head football coach at Cal State Los Angeles for a single season. His 1970 Cal State Los Angeles Diablos football team compiled a record of 1–9. Enger was succeeded by Foster Andersen.

Enger was hired as the head football coach at Pierce in 1987 after the school had disbanded the football program for two years. He led Pierce to a record of 9–21 in three seasons before he was succeeded by Bill Norton following the 1990 campaign.

== Head coaching record ==
=== College ===
Year	Team	Overall	Conference	Standing	Bowl/playoffs
Cal State Los Angeles Diablos (Pacific Coast Athletic Association) (1970)
1970	Cal State Los Angeles	1–9	0–4	7th	
Cal State Los Angeles:		1–9	0–4		
Total:		1–9			

=== Junior college ===
Year	Team	Overall	Conference	Standing	Bowl/playoffs
East Los Angeles Huskies (Metropolitan Conference) (1967–1969)
1967	East Los Angeles	3–6	2–5	7th	
1968	East Los Angeles	11–1	7–0	1st	L California JC large division championship
1969	East Los Angeles	7–2	3–2	T–2nd	
East Los Angeles:		21–9	12–7		
Pierce Brahmas (Western State Conference) (1988–1990)
1988	Pierce	1–9	1–8	5th (Southern)	
1989	Pierce	4–6	3–6 / 3–2	4th (Southern)	
1990	Pierce	4–6	4–5 / 2–3	T–3rd	
Pierce:		9–21	8–19		
Total:		30–30			
National championship Conference title Conference division title or championship game berth
