= Andy Everest =

American football player

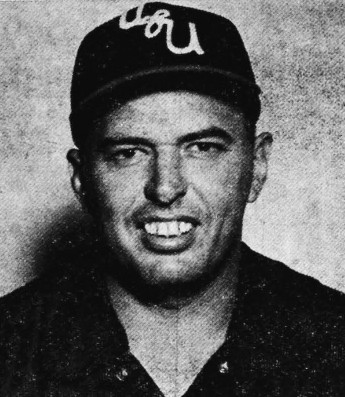
- Everest, circa 1957

Biographical details
- Born: October 27, 1924; Wichita Falls, Texas, U.S.
- Died: December 21, 2014 (aged 90); Arlington, Texas, U.S.

Playing career
- 1946–1950: Texas Western
- Positions: Center, linebacker

Coaching career (HC unless noted)
- 1951: Monahans HS (TX)
- 1952: San Angelo Central HS (TX)
- 1953–1957: Utah (assistant)
- 1958–1962: Stanford (line)
- 1963–1964: SMU (assistant)
- 1965–1969: UC Santa Barbara (assistant)
- 1970–1971: UC Santa Barbara
- 1973–1978: North Texas State (assistant)
- 1982–1985: New Orleans Saints (TE)

Administrative career (AD unless noted)
- 1979–1981: North Texas State

Head coaching record
- Overall: 5–17 (college)

Andrew Sibley Everest (October 27, 1924 – December 21, 2014) was an American football player and coach and college athletics administrator. He served as the head football coach at UC Santa Barbara from 1970 to 1971, compiling a record of 5–17. Everest was the athletic director at North Texas State University—now known as the University of North Texas—from 1979 to 1981.

Everest twice served as an assistant to coach Hayden Fry, first at SMU and later at North Texas State.

== Head coaching record ==
=== College ===
Year	Team	Overall	Conference	Standing	Bowl/playoffs
UC Santa Barbara Gauchos (Pacific Coast Athletic Association) (1970–1971)
1970	UC Santa Barbara	2–9	1–5	6th	
1971	UC Santa Barbara	3–8	2–3	T–4th	
UC Santa Barbara:		5–17	3–8		
Total:		5–17			
