= Albertsons Stadium =

American football stadium at Boise State University

- "The Blue"

- Location in the United States Location in Idaho
- Interactive map of Albertsons Stadium
- Former names: Bronco Stadium (1970–2014)
- Address: 1400 Bronco Lane
- Location: Boise State University; Boise, Idaho, U.S.
- Coordinates: 43.603°N 116.196°W
- Elevation: 2,695 feet (820 m) AMSL
- Owner: Boise State University
- Operator: Boise State University
- Capacity: 35,500 (2026–present); 32,796 (2025–2026); 36,387 (2012–2024); 33,500 (2009–2011); 32,000 (2008); 30,000 (1997–2007); 20,000 (1975–1996); 14,500 (1970–1974)
- Surface: FieldTurf (blue) (2008–present); AstroPlay (blue) – (2002–2007); AstroTurf (blue) – (1986–2001); AstroTurf (green) – (1970–1985)

Construction
- Groundbreaking: November 1969
- Opened: September 11, 1970; 56 years ago
- Expanded: 1975, 1997, 2009, 2012
- Cost: $2.3 million ($19.1 million in 2025 dollars)
- Architect: Sink Combs Dethlefs

Tenants
- Boise State Broncos (NCAA) (1970–present); Famous Idaho Potato Bowl (NCAA) (1997–present)

Albertsons Stadium is an outdoor athletic stadium in the Western United States, located on the campus of Boise State University in Boise, Idaho. It is the home of the Boise State Broncos of the Pac-12 Conference. Known as Bronco Stadium for its first 44 seasons, it was renamed in May 2014 when Albertsons, a chain of grocery stores founded by Boise area resident Joe Albertson, purchased the naming rights.

Opened 56 years ago in 1970, it was also a track & field stadium and hosted the NCAA track & field championships twice, in 1994 and 1999. The stadium was used extensively for local high school football for decades until August 2012, when games were transferred a few blocks northeast to the new Dona Larsen Park, which is also the new home venue of Boise State's track & field team.

Albertsons Stadium is widely known for its unusual blue playing surface, installed in 1986, while Boise State was in the Big Sky Conference. It was the first non-green playing surface (outside of painted end zones) in football history and remained the only one among NCAA Division I Football Bowl Subdivision (FBS) schools for almost 20 years. It is one of only three non-green playing surfaces in the FBS, along with the Eastern Michigan Eagles' Rynearson Stadium and the Coastal Carolina Chanticleers' Brooks Stadium.

Since 1997, it has hosted the Famous Idaho Potato Bowl (known as the Humanitarian Bowl and the MPC Computers Bowl prior to 2011), which is the longest-running outdoor bowl game in a cold-weather venue.

== Location ==
Albertsons Stadium is located at the east end of the BSU campus, bordered by Broadway Avenue to the east, University Drive to the south, and the Boise River to the north. The playing field is aligned north-south at an elevation of 2,695 feet (820 m) above sea level.

== History ==
Albertsons Stadium is the first venue to hold its name. However, when it was Bronco Stadium, it was the fourth venue and second of the same name at Boise State; the three on-campus stadiums were built in 1940, 1950, and 1970, respectively.

=== Public School Field ===
During its first years at its original campus, BJC football was played at "Public School Field," the home field of Boise High School, located three blocks north-northeast of today's Albertsons Stadium. The site was the home of East Junior High School from 1953 to 2009; it was demolished and rebuilt further down Warm Springs Avenue, and the previous area became Dona Larsen Park in 2012.

=== College Field ===
After the college moved to its present campus in 1940, "College Field" opened in September 1940 with lights and a seating capacity of 1,000. Also called "Chaffee Field", it was used through 1949 for junior college football (photo – 1940s). In the 1950s, it became the baseball field, aligned southeast, until right field was displaced by the construction of the Student Union Building, which opened in 1967. The baseball field migrated slightly east, then north, with a new northeast alignment and home plate at (43.60317°N 116.20043°W). It was eliminated in 1980 by the construction of the BSU Pavilion and the relocation of the tennis courts. (Baseball was dropped by both BSU and Idaho following the 1980 season; the Broncos played home games at Borah Field during their final season.)

=== Bronco Stadium (I) ===
The first "Bronco Stadium" was built in three months in 1950 at the east end of campus, with wooden grandstands, a natural grass playing field, lights, and a cinder running track; seating capacity was 10,000. It was in approximately the same location as the present stadium, but aligned northwest to southeast. (photo – 1964) The 45° offset was designed to keep the mid-afternoon sun of mid-October out of the players' eyes (but put it into the eyes of half of the spectators).

From the 1920s through 1968, the University of Idaho Vandals of Moscow usually played one home game per season in Boise, often against schools from Oregon or Utah. Boise State joined the Big Sky in 1970, and Idaho discontinued its practice of scheduling home games in Boise, sometimes referred to as "southern homecoming." (Idaho did use the new Bronco Stadium for a "home" game in 1971, but it was against Boise State in the first football game ever played between the schools. Idaho's new stadium on campus in Moscow was behind schedule, so the university rented Bronco Stadium for its opening game. The underdog "visitors" of Boise State built a 28–7 lead at halftime and won handily 42–14 and a rivalry game was born.)

The Boise College football program upgraded from junior college to four-year status in 1968 and competed as an NAIA independent for two seasons. The school became Boise State College in 1969 and the Broncos were accepted into the NCAA in October. A month later the school was voted into the Big Sky Conference, effective fall 1970. Following the 1969 football season, the first Bronco Stadium was razed in November and the new concrete stadium was ready for play in less than ten months.

=== Bronco Stadium (II) ===
Boise State began NCAA competition in 1970 in the College Division (became Division II in 1973) in a brand new venue. The first game at the new Bronco Stadium was on September 11, a 49–14 victory over Chico State. The $2.2 million concrete stadium opened with a seating capacity of 14,500 and a green AstroTurf playing field, configured in the traditional north–south direction, and an all-weather running track. For its first five seasons, the stadium consisted of two sideline grandstands, the west side having an upper deck and the press box.(photo – 1971) Boise State became a charter member of Division II when the NCAA reorganized the former College Division in 1973.

Following the 1974 season, the school's first as Boise State University, an upper deck was added to the east side (photo – 1971) – (photo −1975), adding 5,500 seats as well as symmetry to the stadium. The permanent seating capacity grew to 20,000 for its Bronco Stadium's sixth season in 1975, with up to 2,600 temporary seats available in the north end zone seating for bigger games. The original green artificial turf was replaced with the same in 1978 as the Big Sky and the Broncos moved up to the newly formed Division I-AA. (photo – mid 1980s) With the largest seating capacity in the conference, Boise State led the Big Sky in attendance; the conference's highest-attended games were when BSU hosted Idaho (even-numbered years), followed by Idaho State at Boise (odd-numbered years in the 1980s).

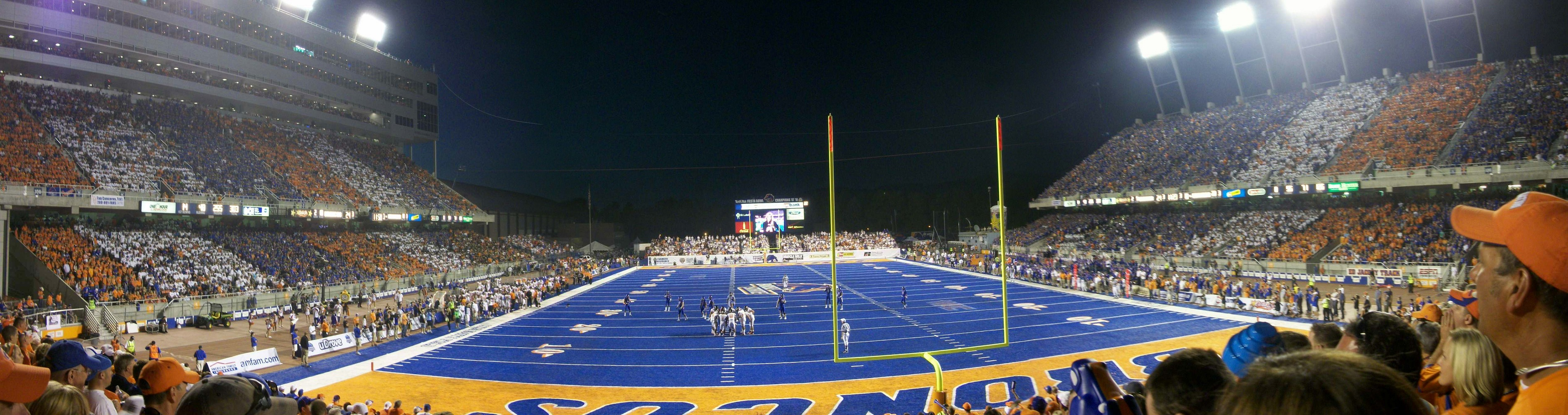
Panoramic view from the south end zone in September 2010; a then-record attendance of 34,137 vs Oregon State, televised on ABC

The Broncos moved to the Big West and Division I-A in 1996, which resulted in another stadium expansion. The two-tier grandstands were extended around the corners of the south end zone, raising the permanent seating capacity to 30,000 in 1997. The latest stadium expansion was completed in time for the 2008 season, with the addition of the Stueckle Sky Club press box, luxury suites, loge boxes, and club seating; raising the capacity to 32,000. In the summer of 2009, 1,500 additional bleacher seats were added to the south end zone to bring capacity up to 33,500. Prior to the 2012 season, expanded bleacher sections were added to the north and south end zones, expanding capacity to a total of 36,387.

The current attendance record is 37,711, set against Washington State on September 28, 2024.

==== Lyle Smith Field ====
During its 11th season, the playing field at Bronco Stadium was named Lyle Smith Field during the I-AA national championship season of 1980. Ceremonies during halftime of the 14–3 victory over Nevada on November 8 marked the event. It honors Lyle H. Smith, the head coach from 1947 to 1967 and athletic director from 1968 to 1981, overseeing BSU's rise from the junior college ranks to Division I-AA champions in 1980.

Smith led Boise, as BJC, to multiple post-season bowls, including the 1958 national junior college championship, and compiled an overall record of 156–26–8 (.842), which included five undefeated seasons and 16 conference titles. He was also the baseball coach for 17 seasons and served as basketball coach for a season at the school. Smith hired Tony Knap to replace himself as football coach in 1968, and Jim Criner to replace Knap in 1976.

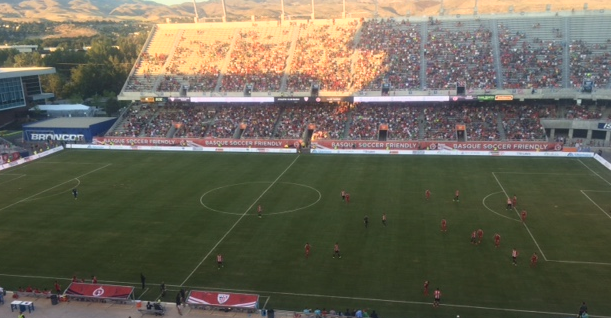
Natural grass was laid over the blue turf for the soccer friendly in 2015

==== Basque Soccer Friendly ====
In 2015, the stadium played host to a soccer friendly on July 18, named the Basque Soccer Friendly, between Athletic Bilbao of La Liga vs Club Tijuana of Liga MX. To accommodate the game, a natural grass surface was laid on top of the famous blue turf to conform to La Liga rules. It was the first time since 1985 that the stadium featured a green surface for any sporting event. Before a crowd of 21,948, Athletic Bilbao won 2–0.

== Blue artificial turf ==
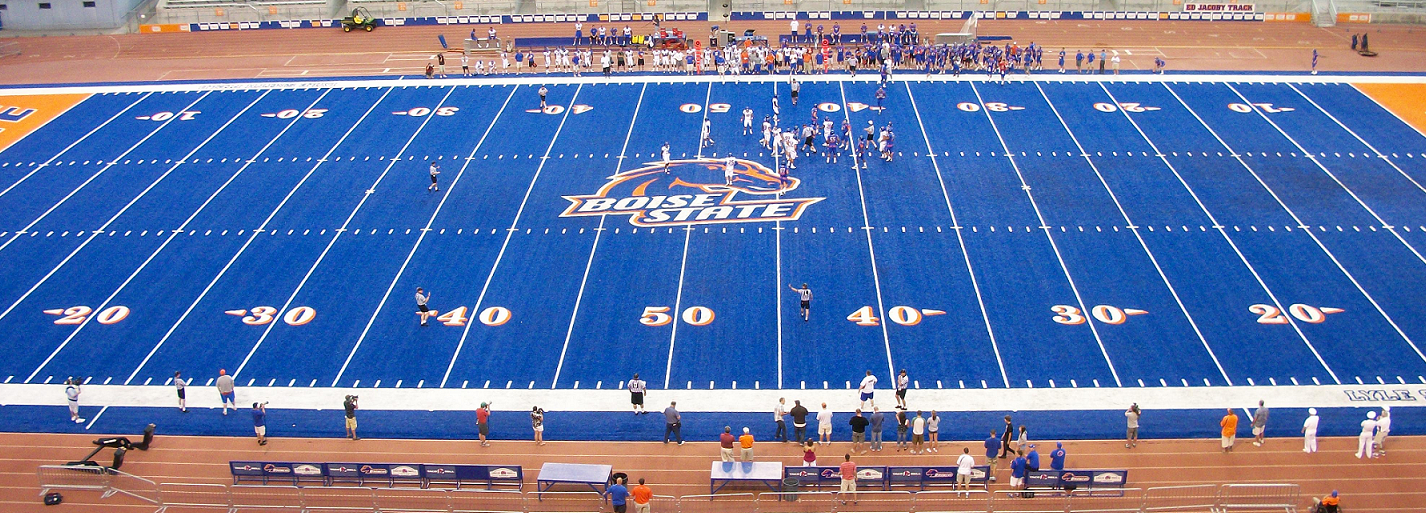
The fifth overall and second blue FieldTurf in August 2010; installed a month earlier.

Albertsons Stadium is best known for its distinctive blue playing surface, which was the only non-green football playing surface among Division I FBS programs from Boise State's entry in 1996 until Eastern Michigan installed a gray surface at Rynearson Stadium in 2014.

The best-known nickname for the surface is "Smurf Turf." Players refer to it simply as "The Blue." Chris Berman of ESPN has also called Boise's turf "The Blue Plastic Tundra", a joking reference to "the frozen tundra" of Lambeau Field in Green Bay, Wisconsin.

After 16 seasons of the Broncos playing on standard green AstroTurf, athletic director Gene Bleymaier devised the idea of installing blue turf, reasoning that if BSU would be spending $750,000 on a new surface, it should not be yet another green field, and that a blue field might provide some national notoriety for the school, then a member of the Big Sky Conference. Bleymaier gained the support of BSU president John Keiser, and on September 13, 1986, Bronco Stadium introduced its unique playing surface to the world with a 74–0 victory over Division II Humboldt State. (BSU was 4–2 at home in 1986, but managed just one road victory and posted its first losing record in four decades, resulting in the resignation of fourth-year head coach Lyle Setencich.)

BSU replaced the first blue AstroTurf with the same in 1995, then with blue Astroplay (a grass-like synthetic surface that is more forgiving than traditional AstroTurf) in 2002. The AstroPlay field lasted just six seasons and was replaced in the summer of 2008 with blue FieldTurf surface. Following fan complaints that the reflection and glare from the field caused it to appear a dull and uneven shade of blue, FieldTurf Tarkett agreed to replace the field free of charge. The fifth blue turf was installed in the summer of 2010.

The unique blue turf has spawned several myths. The most prevalent is that the NCAA subsequently banned playing surface colors other than green but allowed Albertsons Stadium's field to remain blue under a grandfather clause. In reality, the NCAA has never adopted such a rule. Any school may color its playing surface (or any part of the surface, such as the end zones) any color that it wishes. Since 1986, other schools have installed non-green football fields, including the University of New Haven (blue) and Eastern Washington University (red). On April 1, 2011, the University of Central Arkansas announced that it would install a purple-and-grey striped field for Estes Stadium. In 2012, Lindenwood University in Belleville, Illinois played its first football season on a home field with alternating maroon-and-gray stripes. The blue turf at Boise State remained the only non-green field used by a Division I FBS program until June 2014, when Eastern Michigan announced that it would install a gray FieldTurf surface at Rynearson Stadium in time for the 2014 season.

Another myth is that, mistaking the blue field for a large body of water, birds have flown into the blue turf and to their deaths. Although Bronco head coach Chris Petersen claimed to have found a dead duck on the field in 2007, the origin of the duck on the field has never been confirmed.

BSU's blue turf has become such a highly visible icon for the Broncos that BSU obtained a U.S. trademark registration for a blue athletics field in November 2009. In 2010, this trademark was extended to any non-green field.

In 2011, the NFL banned any playing surface color other than green, naming the rule the "Boise Rule" in reference to the university, though this was more a reaction to sponsor influence as no team had ever proposed a different turf color for its field. Also in 2011, the Mountain West Conference banned Boise from wearing its all-blue uniforms during home conference games, after complaints from other Mountain West coaches that it was an unfair advantage. However, the uniform restriction was removed from the 2013 season forward, as part of the deal that kept Boise State in the MW after it had originally planned to leave the conference.

In October 2014, Boise State's blue field topped USA Today's Fan Index list of top 10 best fields in college football.

== Upgrades and additions ==
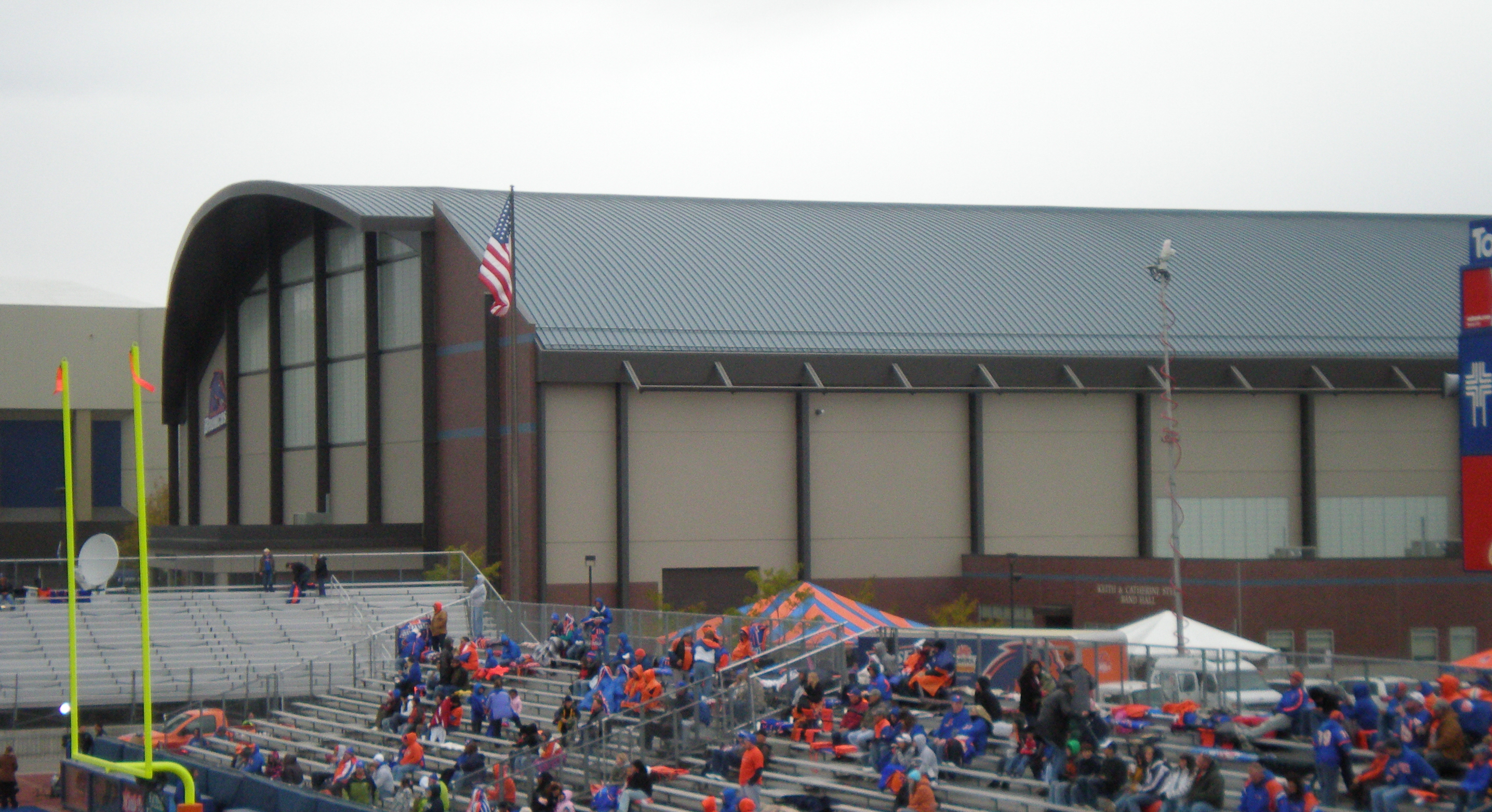
Caven-Williams Sports Complex

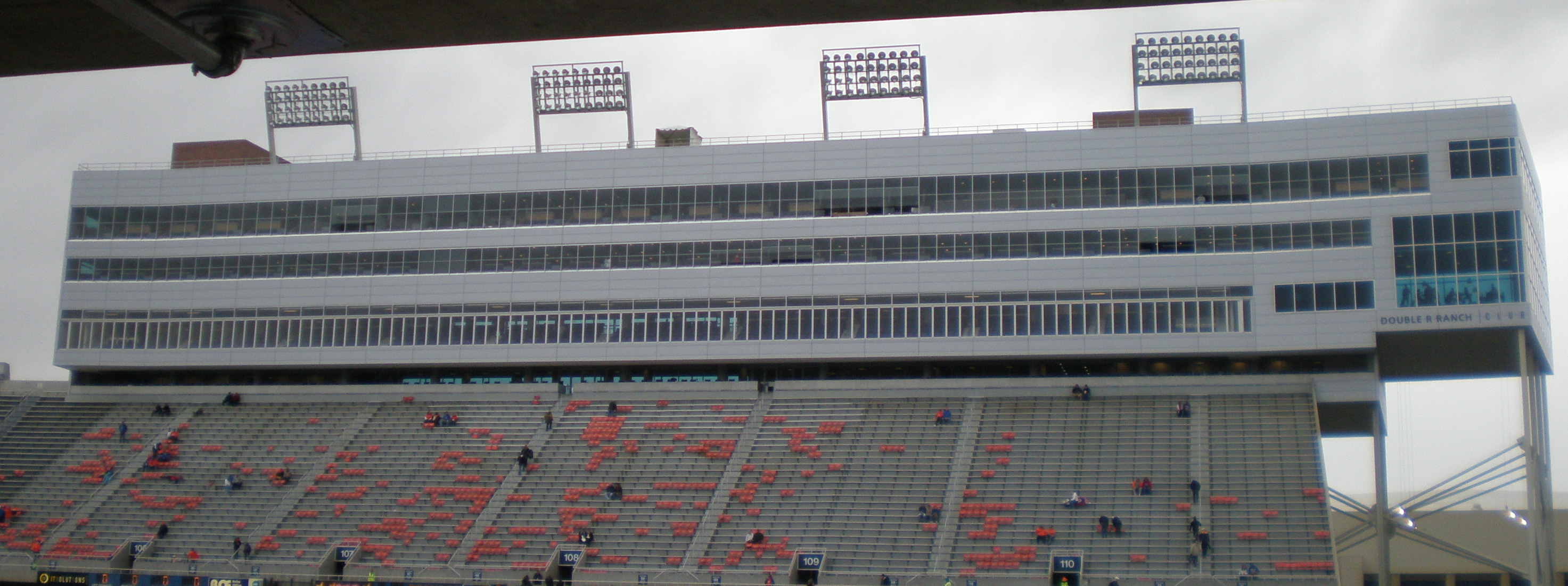
Stueckle Sky Club (2008) in October 2009

As the Boise State football program rose to national prominence in the early 2000s, Albertsons Stadium became increasingly insufficient. The school completed a three-story complex on the stadium's west side called the Stueckle Sky Club (pronounced Stickle). Construction began on February 11, 2007, and the facility officially opened on August 27, 2008 with a gala for ticket holders prior to the first game on August 30. It features levels for a new press box, luxury suites, loge boxes, and club seating and increased seating capacity to 32,000.

The practice facility, named the Caven-Williams Sports Complex, officially opened in February 2006, and is located immediately northwest of Albertsons Stadium. The university added additional temporary seating for 1,500 prior to the 2009 season. The removable bleachers increased capacity to 33,500. It also added permanent bleachers to the north and south end zones prior to the 2012 season, raising Albertsons Stadium's capacity to a total of 37,000.

In late August 2010, the athletic department revealed expansion plans for Albertsons Stadium. The first stages were to include adding a new facility to the north end zone to house the football offices, weight room, training room, equipment room and locker room. Plans also included a 13,200 seat grandstand. The later stages of the expansion plan included removal of the track, lowering of the field, and adding 3,300 seats in front of the first deck of the stadium, completion of the south end zone horseshoe, building of an east side skybox, and renovation of the east side concourse. The total cost for all planned expansions was around $100 million. The total seating capacity for a fully expanded Albertsons Stadium was estimated to be around 53,000. In April 2012, the university broke ground on a revised expansion which was completed by June 2013.

In 2026, Boise State added an 11-foot-tall (3.4 m) bronze statue of former quarterback Kellen Moore outside the stadium. The hash marks along the two- and 11-yard lines were also painted orange to respectively honor running back Ashton Jeanty and Moore.

== Home dominance ==
During Boise State's recent streak of conference championships, Albertsons Stadium has proven to be a tough place for opponents. As of December 6, 2024, following the end of 2024 Mountain West Conference championship game, the Broncos are a sensational 148–14 (.914) at home since the 1999 season. The Broncos won 47 straight home conference games from 1999 to 2011 and were undefeated in home conference games during their 10 years in the WAC (40–0). The Broncos are 141–12 (.922) in regular season home games since 1999, and had a winning streak of 65 regular season home games from 2001 to 2011.

== Top 10 highest attended games ==
Rank	Date	Opponent	Attendance	Score	Winner
1	September 28, 2024	Washington State	37,711	45–24	Boise State
2	October 9, 2022	Fresno State	37,663	40–20	Boise State
3	October 8, 2023	San Jose State	37,491	35–27	Boise State
4	October 2, 2021	Nevada	37,426	31–41	Nevada
5	November 29, 2024	Oregon State	37,264	34–18	Boise State
6	October 5, 2024	Utah State	37,210	62–30	Boise State
7	November 9, 2024	Nevada	37,143	28–21	Boise State
8	September 21, 2024	Portland State	36,972	56–14	Boise State
9	October 12, 2019	Hawaii	36,902	59–37	Boise State
10	September 20, 2012	BYU	36,864	7–6	Boise State

The stadium expanded to 36,387 in 2012 and the highest attendances have all come since. The attendance on September 29, 2024 for the game against visiting Washington State University was listed as 37,711, making it the largest attendance in stadium history.

== See also ==
- List of Boise State Broncos football seasons
- List of NCAA Division I FBS football stadiums
- List of college football stadiums with non-traditional field colors
