= 1970 Long Beach State 49ers football team =

American college football season

1970 Long Beach State 49ers football

PCAA co-champion

Pasadena Bowl, T 24–24 vs. Louisville
- Conference: Pacific Coast Athletic Association
- Record: 9–2–1 (5–1 PCAA)
- Head coach: Jim Stangeland (2nd season)
- Home stadium: Veterans Stadium; Anaheim Stadium

1970 Pacific Coast Athletic Association football standings
	Conf.					Overall
Team	W		L		T	W		L		T
San Diego State +	5	–	1	–	0	9	–	2	–	0
Long Beach State +	5	–	1	–	0	9	–	2	–	1
Fresno State	4	–	2	–	0	8	–	4	–	0
Pacific (CA)	2	–	3	–	0	5	–	6	–	0
San Jose State	2	–	3	–	0	2	–	9	–	0
UC Santa Barbara	1	–	5	–	0	2	–	9	–	0
Cal State Los Angeles	0	–	4	–	0	1	–	9	–	0
+ – Conference co-champions

The 1970 Long Beach State 49ers football team represented California State College, Long Beach—now known as California State University, Long Beach—as a member of the Pacific Coast Athletic Association (PCAA) during the 1970 NCAA University Division football season. Led second-year head coach Jim Stangeland, the 49ers compiled an overall record of 9–2–1 with a mark of 5–1 in conference play, sharing the PCAA title with San Diego State. Since Long Beach State had beaten San Diego State head-to-head, the 49ers qualified for a postseason bowl game, the Pasadena Bowl. Played on December 19 against the Missouri Valley Conference champion Louisville Cardinals at the Rose Bowl in Pasadena, the game ended in 24–24 tie. The team played four home games at Veterans Memorial Stadium adjacent to the campus of Long Beach City College in Long Beach, California and one well-attended game at Anaheim Stadium in Anaheim on a Friday night against San Diego State.

Running back Leon Burns received first-team honors on the 1970 Little All-America college football team.

== Schedule ==
Date	Time	Opponent	Site	Result	Attendance	Source
September 12	7:00 p.m.	vs. Montana State*	Memorial Stadium; Great Falls, MT	W 19–3	6,000–6,100	
September 19	7:30 p.m.	at Pacific (CA)	Pacific Memorial Stadium; Stockton, CA	L 6–9	15,840	
September 26		Hawaii*	Veterans Memorial Stadium; Long Beach, CA	L 14–23	10,351	
October 3	8:00 p.m.	at San Jose State	Spartan Stadium; San Jose, CA	W 7–3	10,100–10,400	
October 10		Boise State*	Veterans Memorial Stadium; Long Beach, CA	W 27–14	6,472	
October 16		UC Santa Barbara	Veterans Memorial Stadium; Long Beach, CA	W 33–7	5,718	
October 31		Cal Poly*	Veterans Memorial Stadium; Long Beach, CA	W 49–20	5,724	
November 7		at Fresno State	Ratcliffe Stadium; Fresno, CA	W 50–14	7,500–8,500	
November 12		at Cal State Los Angeles	East L.A. College Stadium; Monterey Park, CA	W 40–7	1,446	
November 20		No. 14 San Diego State	Anaheim Stadium; Anaheim, CA	W 27–11	39,005	
November 28		at Valley State*	Birmingham High School; Van Nuys, CA	W 21–0	200–300	
December 19		vs. Louisville*	Rose Bowl; Pasadena, CA (Pasadena Bowl)	T 24–24	20,472	
*Non-conference game; Rankings from AP Poll released prior to the game; All times are in Pacific time

== NFL draft ==
Two 49ers were selected in the 1971 NFL draft.

Player	Position	Round	Overall	NFL club
Leon Burns	Running back	1	13	San Diego Chargers
Jeff Severson	Defensive back	12	297	Washington Redskins
