= 1973 Illinois State Redbirds football team =

American college football season

1973 Illinois State Redbirds football
- Conference: Independent
- Record: 5–6
- Head coach: Gerry Hart (2nd season)
- Home stadium: Hancock Stadium

1973 NCAA Division II independents football records
	Conf.			Overall
Team	W	L	T	W		L		T
No. 1 Tennessee State		–		10	–	0	–	0
No. 9 Hawaii		–		9	–	2	–	0
Nebraska–Omaha		–		7	–	2	–	1
Trinity (TX)		–		8	–	3	–	0
UNLV		–		8	–	3	–	0
No. 13 Delaware ^		–		8	–	4	–	0
Western Carolina		–		6	–	3	–	1
Central Michigan		–		7	–	4	–	0
Nevada		–		7	–	4	–	0
Western Illinois		–		7	–	4	–	0
Milwaukee		–		6	–	4	–	1
Eastern Michigan		–		6	–	4	–	0
American International		–		5	–	4	–	0
Akron		–		6	–	5	–	0
Central State (OH)		–		6	–	5	–	0
Ball State		–		5	–	5	–	1
Wayne State (MI)		–		5	–	5	–	0
Drexel		–		4	–	4	–	0
Bucknell		–		3	–	4	–	2
Northeast Louisiana		–		3	–	5	–	2
Santa Clara		–		4	–	6	–	0
Youngstown State		–		4	–	6	–	0
Arkansas–Pine Bluff		–		3	–	5	–	1
Chattanooga		–		4	–	7	–	0
Indiana State		–		4	–	7	–	0
Northeastern		–		3	–	6	–	0
Kentucky State		–		3	–	8	–	0
Northern Michigan		–		2	–	7	–	1
Illinois College		–		2	–	7	–	0
Eastern Illinois		–		2	–	9	–	0
Portland State		–		1	–	10	–	0
^ – NCAA Division II playoff participant; Rankings from AP small college poll

The 1973 Illinois State Redbirds football team represented Illinois State University as an independent during the 1973 NCAA Division II football season. In their second season under head coach Gerry Hart, the Redbirds compiled a 5–6 record.

== Schedule ==
Date	Opponent	Site	Result	Attendance	Source
September 8	at Milwaukee	Marquette Stadium; Milwaukee, WI	L 29–34	8,327	
September 15	Stephen F. Austin	Hancock Stadium; Normal, IL	L 7–9	9,000	
September 22	The Citadel	Hancock Stadium; Normal, IL	W 24–6	9,000	
September 29	at Southwest Missouri State	Briggs Stadium; Springfield, MO	W 20–3	7,000	
October 6	at Central Michigan	Perry Shorts Stadium; Mount Pleasant, MI	L 3–6	18,822	
October 20	Eastern Illinois	Hancock Stadium; Normal, IL (rivalry)	W 17–0	18,500	
October 27	Northern Illinois	Hancock Stadium; Normal, IL	L 14–28	6,000	
November 3	at Arkansas State	Kays Stadium; Jonesboro, AR	L 20–38	8,700	
November 10	at Indiana State	Memorial Stadium; Terre Haute, IN	W 21–17	4,400	
November 17	at Ball State	Ball State Stadium; Muncie, IN	L 18–27	4,570	
November 24	Southern Illinois	Hancock Stadium; Normal, IL	W 10–8	4,000	
