= 1974 Illinois State Redbirds football team =

American college football season

1974 Illinois State Redbirds football
- Conference: Independent
- Record: 6–5
- Head coach: Gerry Hart (3rd season)
- Home stadium: Hancock Stadium

1974 NCAA Division II independents football records
	Conf.			Overall
Team	W	L	T	W		L		T
No. 1 Central Michigan ^		–		12	–	1	–	0
No. 6 UNLV ^		–		12	–	1	–	0
No. 4 Delaware ^		–		12	–	2	–	0
No. 8 Western Carolina ^		–		9	–	2	–	0
No. 9 Tennessee State		–		8	–	2	–	0
No. 12 Youngstown State ^		–		8	–	2	–	0
Santa Clara		–		7	–	3	–	0
Wayne State (MI)		–		7	–	3	–	0
Ball State		–		6	–	4	–	0
Kentucky State		–		6	–	4	–	0
Northeastern		–		6	–	4	–	0
Central State (OH)		–		6	–	5	–	0
Akron		–		5	–	5	–	0
Illinois College		–		4	–	4	–	0
Indiana State		–		5	–	5	–	0
Nevada		–		5	–	6	–	0
Portland State		–		5	–	6	–	0
American International		–		4	–	5	–	0
Eastern Michigan		–		4	–	6	–	1
Milwaukee		–		4	–	6	–	0
Northeast Louisiana		–		4	–	6	–	0
Eastern Illinois		–		3	–	6	–	1
Arkansas–Pine Bluff		–		3	–	5	–	0
Chattanooga		–		4	–	7	–	0
Nebraska–Omaha		–		3	–	7	–	0
Bucknell		–		2	–	8	–	0
Northern Michigan		–		0	–	10	–	0
^ – NCAA Division II playoff participant; Rankings from AP small college poll

The 1974 Illinois State Redbirds football team represented Illinois State University as an independent during the 1974 NCAA Division II football season. In their third season under head coach Gerry Hart, the Redbirds compiled a 6–5 record.

== Schedule ==
Date	Opponent	Site	Result	Attendance	Source
September 7	at Louisiana Tech	Joe Aillet Stadium; Ruston, LA	L 7–16	17,400	
September 14	Milwaukee	Hancock Stadium; Normal, IL	W 24–7	7,500	
September 21	at Western Illinois	Hanson Field; Macomb, IL	W 37–20	11,900	
September 28	Southwest Missouri State	Hancock Stadium; Normal, IL	W 28–0	8,000	
October 5	Central Michigan	Hancock Stadium; Normal, IL	L 14–21	10,000	
October 12	Arkansas State	Hancock Stadium; Normal, IL	L 0–38	14,000	
October 19	at Eastern Illinois	O'Brien Stadium; Charleston, IL (rivalry)	L 9–14	7,500	
October 26	at Northern Illinois	Huskie Stadium; DeKalb, IL	W 24–14	14,470	
November 9	Indiana State	Hancock Stadium; Normal, IL	W 16–7	5,000	
November 16	Ball State	Hancock Stadium; Normal, IL	L 7–18	2,500	
November 23	at Southern Illinois	McAndrew Stadium; Carbondale, IL	W 31–16	1,203	
