= 1974 Eastern Illinois Panthers football team =

American college football season

1974 Eastern Illinois Panthers football
- Conference: Independent
- Record: 3–6–1
- Head coach: Jack Dean (3rd season)
- Home stadium: O'Brien Stadium

1974 NCAA Division II independents football records
	Conf.			Overall
Team	W	L	T	W		L		T
No. 1 Central Michigan ^		–		12	–	1	–	0
No. 6 UNLV ^		–		12	–	1	–	0
No. 4 Delaware ^		–		12	–	2	–	0
No. 8 Western Carolina ^		–		9	–	2	–	0
No. 9 Tennessee State		–		8	–	2	–	0
No. 12 Youngstown State ^		–		8	–	2	–	0
Santa Clara		–		7	–	3	–	0
Wayne State (MI)		–		7	–	3	–	0
Ball State		–		6	–	4	–	0
Kentucky State		–		6	–	4	–	0
Northeastern		–		6	–	4	–	0
Central State (OH)		–		6	–	5	–	0
Illinois State		–		6	–	5	–	0
Akron		–		5	–	5	–	0
Illinois College		–		4	–	4	–	0
Indiana State		–		5	–	5	–	0
Nevada		–		5	–	6	–	0
Portland State		–		5	–	6	–	0
American International		–		4	–	5	–	0
Eastern Michigan		–		4	–	6	–	1
Milwaukee		–		4	–	6	–	0
Northeast Louisiana		–		4	–	6	–	0
Eastern Illinois		–		3	–	6	–	1
Arkansas–Pine Bluff		–		3	–	5	–	0
Chattanooga		–		4	–	7	–	0
Nebraska–Omaha		–		3	–	7	–	0
Bucknell		–		2	–	8	–	0
Northern Michigan		–		0	–	10	–	0
^ – NCAA Division II playoff participant; Rankings from AP small college poll

The 1974 Eastern Illinois Panthers football team represented as an independent Eastern Illinois University during the 1974 NCAA Division II football season. The Panthers played their home games at O'Brien Stadium in Charleston, Illinois.

== Schedule ==
Date	Opponent	Site	Result	Attendance	Source
September 7	at Central Missouri State	Audrey J. Walton Stadium; Warrensburg, MO	L 14–19	6,800	
September 14	at Indiana State	Memorial Stadium; Terre Haute, IN	L 6–21	9,041	
September 21	Milwaukee	O'Brien Stadium; Charleston, IL	L 0–33	8,000	
October 5	at Western Illinois	Hanson Field; Macomb, IL	L 3–28	8,600	
October 12	Delta State	O'Brien Stadium; Charleston, IL	W 13–3	3,500	
October 19	Illinois State	O'Brien Stadium; Charleston, IL (rivalry)	W 14–9	7,500	
October 26	at Ferris State	Big Rapids, MI	T 10–10	5,500	
November 2	Youngstown State	O'Brien Stadium; Charleston, IL	L 3–13	3,000	
November 9	Missouri–Rolla	O'Brien Stadium; Charleston, IL	W 17–0	2,000	
November 16	at Murray State	Roy Stewart Stadium; Murray, KY	L 0–13	7,500	
