= 1973 Milwaukee Panthers football team =

American college football season

1973 Milwaukee Panthers football
- Conference: Independent
- Record: 6–4–1
- Head coach: Glenn Brady (1st season)
- Home stadium: Marquette Stadium

1973 NCAA Division II independents football records
| | Conf. | | | Overall |
| Team | W | L | T | W | | L | | T |
|---|---|---|---|---|---|---|---|---|
| No. 1 Tennessee State | | – | | 10 | – | 0 | – | 0 |
| No. 9 Hawaii | | – | | 9 | – | 2 | – | 0 |
| Nebraska–Omaha | | – | | 7 | – | 2 | – | 1 |
| Trinity (TX) | | – | | 8 | – | 3 | – | 0 |
| UNLV | | – | | 8 | – | 3 | – | 0 |
| No. 13 Delaware ^ | | – | | 8 | – | 4 | – | 0 |
| Western Carolina | | – | | 6 | – | 3 | – | 1 |
| Central Michigan | | – | | 7 | – | 4 | – | 0 |
| Nevada | | – | | 7 | – | 4 | – | 0 |
| Western Illinois | | – | | 7 | – | 4 | – | 0 |
| Milwaukee | | – | | 6 | – | 4 | – | 1 |
| Eastern Michigan | | – | | 6 | – | 4 | – | 0 |
| American International | | – | | 5 | – | 4 | – | 0 |
| Akron | | – | | 6 | – | 5 | – | 0 |
| Central State (OH) | | – | | 6 | – | 5 | – | 0 |
| Ball State | | – | | 5 | – | 5 | – | 1 |
| Wayne State (MI) | | – | | 5 | – | 5 | – | 0 |
| Drexel | | – | | 4 | – | 4 | – | 0 |
| Bucknell | | – | | 3 | – | 4 | – | 2 |
| Northeast Louisiana | | – | | 3 | – | 5 | – | 2 |
| Illinois State | | – | | 5 | – | 6 | – | 0 |
| Santa Clara | | – | | 4 | – | 6 | – | 0 |
| Youngstown State | | – | | 4 | – | 6 | – | 0 |
| Arkansas–Pine Bluff | | – | | 3 | – | 5 | – | 1 |
| Chattanooga | | – | | 4 | – | 7 | – | 0 |
| Indiana State | | – | | 4 | – | 7 | – | 0 |
| Northeastern | | – | | 3 | – | 6 | – | 0 |
| Kentucky State | | – | | 3 | – | 8 | – | 0 |
| Northern Michigan | | – | | 2 | – | 7 | – | 1 |
| Illinois College | | – | | 2 | – | 7 | – | 0 |
| Eastern Illinois | | – | | 2 | – | 9 | – | 0 |
| Portland State | | – | | 1 | – | 10 | – | 0 |
^ – NCAA Division II playoff participant; Rankings from AP small college poll

The 1973 Milwaukee Panthers football team represented the University of Wisconsin–Milwaukee as an independent the 1973 NCAA Division II football season. Led by first-year head coach Glenn Brady, Milwaukee compiled a record of 6–4–1. The Panthers offense scored 251 points while the defense allowed 218 points.

== Schedule ==
| Date | Opponent | Site | Result | Attendance | Source |
|---|---|---|---|---|---|
| September 8 | Illinois State | Marquette Stadium; Milwaukee, WI | W 34–29 | 8,327 | |
| September 15 | at Northern Michigan | Memorial Field; Marquette, MI | T 21–21 | 3,600 | |
| September 22 | Eastern Illinois | Marquette Stadium; Milwaukee, WI | W 21–14 | 7,800 | |
| September 29 | at Western Illinois | Hanson Field; Macomb, IL | L 3–28 | 9,275 | |
| October 6 | Missouri–Rolla | Marquette Stadium; Milwaukee, WI | W 45–7 | 8,000 | |
| October 13 | at Chicago Circle | Soldier Field; Chicago, IL | W 32–0 | 200 | |
| October 20 | at No. 13 UNLV | Las Vegas Stadium; Whitney, NV | L 24–35 | 11,738 | |
| October 27 | at St. Norbert | Minahan Stadium; De Pere, WI | L 7–24 | 500 | |
| November 3 | Central State (OH) | Marquette Stadium; Milwaukee, WI | W 28–15 | 8,000 | |
| November 10 | Ferris State | Marquette Stadium; Milwaukee, WI | W 23–17 | 8,000 | |
| November 17 | at Nebraska–Omaha | Al F. Caniglia Field; Omaha, NE | L 13–28 | 6,122 | |
Rankings from AP Poll released prior to the game; Source:
