= 1973 Eastern Illinois Panthers football team =

American college football season

1973 Eastern Illinois Panthers football
- Conference: Independent
- Record: 2–9
- Head coach: Jack Dean (2nd season)
- Home stadium: O'Brien Stadium

1973 NCAA Division II independents football records
	Conf.			Overall
Team	W	L	T	W		L		T
No. 1 Tennessee State		–		10	–	0	–	0
No. 9 Hawaii		–		9	–	2	–	0
Nebraska–Omaha		–		7	–	2	–	1
Trinity (TX)		–		8	–	3	–	0
UNLV		–		8	–	3	–	0
No. 13 Delaware ^		–		8	–	4	–	0
Western Carolina		–		6	–	3	–	1
Central Michigan		–		7	–	4	–	0
Nevada		–		7	–	4	–	0
Western Illinois		–		7	–	4	–	0
Milwaukee		–		6	–	4	–	1
Eastern Michigan		–		6	–	4	–	0
American International		–		5	–	4	–	0
Akron		–		6	–	5	–	0
Central State (OH)		–		6	–	5	–	0
Ball State		–		5	–	5	–	1
Wayne State (MI)		–		5	–	5	–	0
Drexel		–		4	–	4	–	0
Bucknell		–		3	–	4	–	2
Northeast Louisiana		–		3	–	5	–	2
Illinois State		–		5	–	6	–	0
Santa Clara		–		4	–	6	–	0
Youngstown State		–		4	–	6	–	0
Arkansas–Pine Bluff		–		3	–	5	–	1
Chattanooga		–		4	–	7	–	0
Indiana State		–		4	–	7	–	0
Northeastern		–		3	–	6	–	0
Kentucky State		–		3	–	8	–	0
Northern Michigan		–		2	–	7	–	1
Illinois College		–		2	–	7	–	0
Eastern Illinois		–		2	–	9	–	0
Portland State		–		1	–	10	–	0
^ – NCAA Division II playoff participant; Rankings from AP small college poll

The 1973 Eastern Illinois Panthers football team represented Eastern Illinois University as an independent during the 1973 NCAA Division II football season. The Panthers played their home games at O'Brien Stadium in Charleston, Illinois.

== Schedule ==
Date	Opponent	Site	Result	Attendance	Source
September 8	at Wisconsin–Stevens Point	Goerke Field; Stevens Point, WI	L 20–21	8,000	
September 15	Indiana State	O'Brien Stadium; Charleston, IL	L 0–17	8,000	
September 22	at Milwaukee	Marquette Stadium; Milwaukee, WI	L 14–21	7,800	
September 29	Chicago Circle	O'Brien Stadium; Charleston, IL	W 40–8	8,000	
October 6	at Delta State	McCool Stadium; Cleveland, MS	L 17–47	3,500	
October 13	at Youngstown State	Rayen Stadium; Youngstown, OH	L 14–27	1,500	
October 20	at Illinois State	Hancock Stadium; Normal, IL (rivalry)	L 0–17	18,500	
October 27	Saint Joseph's (IN)	O'Brien Stadium; Charleston, IL	W 34–14	4,500	
November 3	Wayne State (MI)	O'Brien Stadium; Charleston, IL	L 10–14	2,500	
November 10	Northern Michigan	O'Brien Stadium; Charleston, IL	L 7–22	1,500	
November 17	Western Illinois	O'Brien Stadium; Charleston, IL	L 13–56	4,000	
