= 1973 Ball State Cardinals football team =

American college football season

1973 Ball State Cardinals football
- Conference: Independent
- Record: 5–5–1
- Head coach: Dave McClain (3rd season)
- Home stadium: Ball State Stadium

1973 NCAA Division II independents football records
	Conf.			Overall
Team	W	L	T	W		L		T
No. 1 Tennessee State		–		10	–	0	–	0
No. 9 Hawaii		–		9	–	2	–	0
Nebraska–Omaha		–		7	–	2	–	1
Trinity (TX)		–		8	–	3	–	0
UNLV		–		8	–	3	–	0
No. 13 Delaware ^		–		8	–	4	–	0
Western Carolina		–		6	–	3	–	1
Central Michigan		–		7	–	4	–	0
Nevada		–		7	–	4	–	0
Western Illinois		–		7	–	4	–	0
Milwaukee		–		6	–	4	–	1
Eastern Michigan		–		6	–	4	–	0
American International		–		5	–	4	–	0
Akron		–		6	–	5	–	0
Central State (OH)		–		6	–	5	–	0
Ball State		–		5	–	5	–	1
Wayne State (MI)		–		5	–	5	–	0
Drexel		–		4	–	4	–	0
Bucknell		–		3	–	4	–	2
Northeast Louisiana		–		3	–	5	–	2
Illinois State		–		5	–	6	–	0
Santa Clara		–		4	–	6	–	0
Youngstown State		–		4	–	6	–	0
Arkansas–Pine Bluff		–		3	–	5	–	1
Chattanooga		–		4	–	7	–	0
Indiana State		–		4	–	7	–	0
Northeastern		–		3	–	6	–	0
Kentucky State		–		3	–	8	–	0
Northern Michigan		–		2	–	7	–	1
Illinois College		–		2	–	7	–	0
Eastern Illinois		–		2	–	9	–	0
Portland State		–		1	–	10	–	0
^ – NCAA Division II playoff participant; Rankings from AP small college poll

The 1973 Ball State Cardinals football team was an American football team that represented Ball State University as an independent during the 1973 NCAA Division II football season. In its third season under head coach Dave McClain, the team compiled a 5–5–1 record. The team played its home games at Ball State Stadium in Muncie, Indiana.

== Schedule ==
Date	Time	Opponent	Site	Result	Attendance	Source
September 8		at Eastern Michigan	Rynearson Stadium; Ypsilanti, MI	L 14–17	8,500–9,200	
September 15		at Central Michigan	Perry Shorts Stadium; Mount Pleasant, MI	L 7–14	14,732	
September 22		Butler	Ball State Stadium; Muncie, IN (Band Day)	W 52–14	16,875	
September 29		at Akron	Rubber Bowl; Akron, OH	W 16–14	9,755	
October 6		Indiana State^{†}	Ball State Stadium; Muncie, IN (Blue Key Victory Bell)	W 18–17	16,912	
October 13		at Dayton	Baujan Field; Dayton, OH	L 12–13	7,519	
October 20	2:30 p.m.	at Northern Illinois	Huskie Stadium; DeKalb, IL (rivalry)	L 17–45	15,739	
October 27		Middle Tennessee	Ball State Stadium; Muncie, IN	W 34–3	5,350	
November 3	1:30 p.m.	Southern Illinois	Ball State Stadium; Muncie, IN	T 16–16	10,160	
November 10	1:30 p.m.	at Western Michigan	Waldo Stadium; Kalamazoo, MI	L 13–30	16,100	
November 17		Illinois State	Ball State Stadium; Muncie, IN	W 27–18	4,570	
^{†}Homecoming; All times are in Eastern time
