= Gerry Hart (American football) =

American football coach (1935–2011)

Biographical details
- Born: January 31, 1935; West Frankfort, Illinois, U.S.
- Died: April 27, 2011 (aged 76); Carbondale, Illinois, U.S.
- Education: Southern Illinois

Coaching career (HC unless noted)
- 1967–1971: Illinois State (assistant)
- 1972–1976: Illinois State

Head coaching record
- Overall: 26–27–1

Gerald L. Hart (January 31, 1935 – April 27, 2011) was an American football coach. He was the 15th head football coach at Illinois State University in Normal, Illinois, serving for five seasons, from 1972 to 1976, and compiling a record of 26–27–1.

Prior to accepting the Illinois State head coaching position; Hart coached at a number of Illinois High Schools before moving on to coach at Southern Illinois University and Western Illinois University. He was also an assistant in the Canadian Football League, for both the Calgary Stampeders and the Saskatchewan Roughriders.

== Head coaching record ==
Year	Team	Overall	Conference	Standing	Bowl/playoffs
Illinois State Redbirds (NCAA College Division / Division II independent) (1972–1975)
1972	Illinois State	8–3			
1973	Illinois State	5–6			
1974	Illinois State	6–5			
1975	Illinois State	2–7–1			
Illinois State Redbirds (NCAA Division I independent) (1976)
1976	Illinois State	5–6			
Illinois State:		26–27–1			
Total:		26–27–1			
