= Ollie Keller =

American football player and coach (1929–2019)

Biographical details
- Born: March 8, 1929; Blount County, Tennessee, U.S.
- Died: April 21, 2019 (aged 90); Fairhope, Alabama, U.S.

Playing career

Football
- 1951: Tennessee
- 1952–1953: Memphis State

Basketball
- 1951–1953: Memphis State
- Position: Halfback

Coaching career (HC unless noted)

Football
- 1954: Hall HS (TN)
- 1955–1956: Maryville HS (TN)
- 1957–1967: Memphis Catholic HS (TN)
- 1968: Iowa State (assistant)
- 1970–1971: Memphis State (assistant)
- 1972–1975: Northeast Louisiana
- 1976: Colorado State (OC)

Head coaching record
- Overall: 14–24–3 (college)

Ollie Keller (March 8, 1929 – April 21, 2019) was an American football player and coach. He served as the head football coach at Northeast Louisiana University—now known as University of Louisiana at Monroe—in Monroe, Louisiana for four seasons, from 1972 until 1975, compiling record of 14–24–3.

== Coaching career ==
Keller began his coaching career at Halls High School followed by two years at his high school alma mater, Maryville High School. He spent the next ten years coaching at Memphis Catholic High School (1957–1967), which was a perennial football powerhouse. Keller moved to the college level in 1968 as an assistant at Iowa State University under Johnny Majors before returning to Memphis State as an assistant in 1970.

== Death ==
Keller died on April 21, 2019, at his home in Fairhope, Alabama.

== Head coaching record ==
Year	Team	Overall	Conference	Standing	Bowl/playoffs
Northeast Louisiana Indians (NCAA College Division independent) (1972)
1972	Northeast Louisiana	3–7			
Northeast Louisiana Indians (NCAA Division II independent) (1973–1974)
1973	Northeast Louisiana	3–5–2			
1974	Northeast Louisiana	4–6			
Northeast Louisiana Indians (NCAA Division I independent) (1975)
1975	Northeast Louisiana	4–6–1			
Northeast Louisiana:		14–24–3			
Total:		14–24–3			
