= Jack Dean (American football) =

American football player and coach

Biographical details
- Born: c. 1944

Playing career
- 1961–1964: Northern Illinois
- Positions: Halfback, quarterback

Coaching career (HC unless noted)
- ?: Wisconsin–Whitewater (assistant)
- 1969–1971: Eastern Illinois (OB)
- 1972–1974: Eastern Illinois
- 1975–1976: Northern Illinois (OC)

Head coaching record
- Overall: 6–24–1

Jack W. Dean (born c. 1944) is an American former football player and coach. He served as the head football coach at Eastern Illinois University from 1972 to 1974, compiling a record of 6–24–1. Dean was the offensive backfield coach at Eastern Illinois for three years before succeeding Clyde Biggers as head coach in 1972.

== Head coaching record ==
| Year | Team | Overall | Conference | Standing | Bowl/playoffs |
|---|---|---|---|---|---|
Eastern Illinois Panthers (NCAA College Division / Division II independent) (1972–1974)
| 1972 | Eastern Illinois | 1–9 | | | |
| 1973 | Eastern Illinois | 2–9 | | | |
| 1974 | Eastern Illinois | 3–6–1 | | | |
| Eastern Illinois: | | 6–24–1 | | | |
| Total: | | 6–24–1 | | | |
