= Scattini =

Scattini is an Italian surname. Notable people with the surname include:

- Luigi Scattini (1927–2010), Italian film director and screenwriter
- Jerry Scattini (born 1941), American former college football coach
- Monica Scattini (1956–2015), Italian actress
