= Roy Kramer =

American college football coach and administrator (1929–2025)

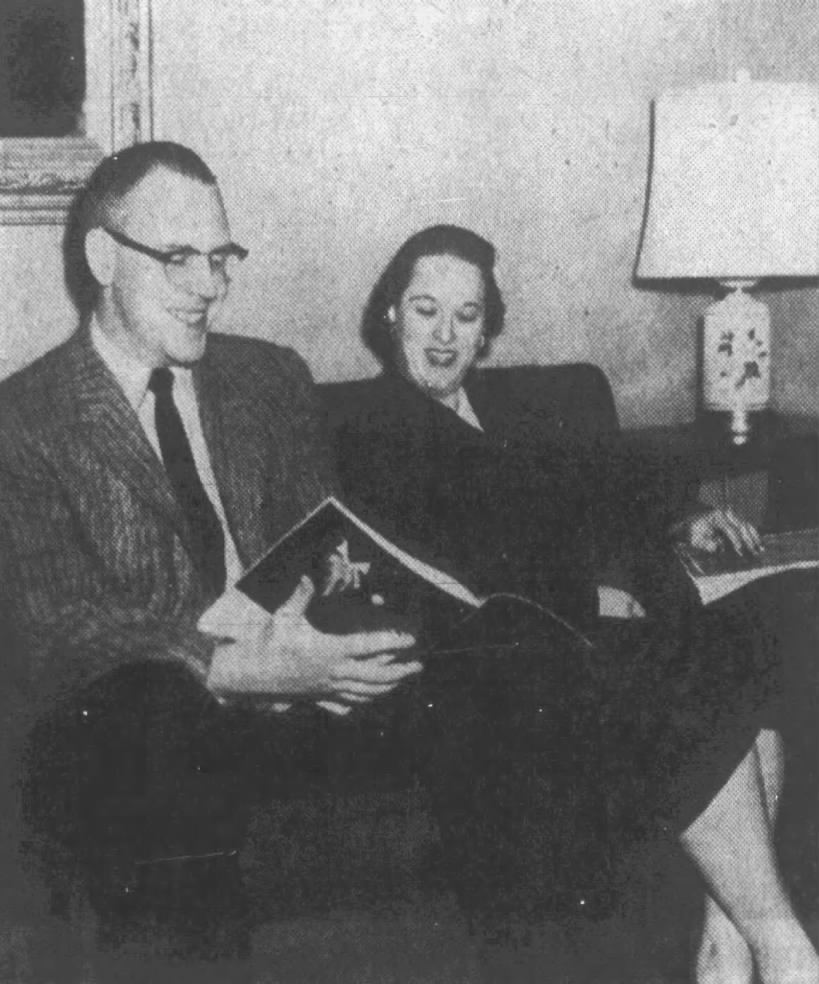
- Kramer (left) with his wife Sara Jo, c. 1958

Biographical details
- Born: October 30, 1929; Maryville, Tennessee, U.S.
- Died: December 4, 2025 (aged 96); Vonore, Tennessee, U.S.
- Education: Maryville College; University of Michigan

Coaching career (HC unless noted)
- 1955: Battle Creek Central HS (MI) (assistant)
- 1956: Hudson HS (MI)
- 1957: Dowagiac HS (MI)
- 1958–1959: Benton Harbor HS (MI)
- 1960–1964: East Lansing HS (MI)
- 1965–1977: Central Michigan

Administrative career (AD unless noted)
- 1978–1990: Vanderbilt
- 1990–2002: SEC (commissioner)

Head coaching record
- Overall: 83–32–2 (college); 58–14–3 (high school)
- Tournaments: 3–0 (NCAA D-II playoffs)

Accomplishments and honors

Championships
- 1 NCAA Division II (1974); 2 IIAC (1967–1968)
- College Football Hall of Fame; Inducted in 2023 (profile)

Roy Foster Kramer (October 30, 1929 – December 4, 2025) was an American college football coach and athletics administrator. Kramer was the head football coach for Central Michigan University from 1967 to 1977, compiling a record of 83–32–2 and winning the 1974 NCAA Division II Football Championship. He then served as the athletic director at Vanderbilt University from 1978 to 1990, and later as the commissioner of the Southeastern Conference from 1990 to 2002, where he created the Bowl Championship Series.

== Early life and education ==
Roy Foster Kramer was born in Maryville, Tennessee, on October 30, 1929. Kramer played football and wrestled at Maryville College until he was drafted into the Korean War. He served in the military for three years before graduating in 1953. He went on to attend the University of Michigan to earn his master's in both history and education.

== High school career ==
Kramer began his coaching at various Michigan high schools at the start of his career. His first post was at Battle Creek Central High School in 1955, working as an assistant coach. While coaching, Kramer taught history. He then moved to Hudson High School in 1956 for his first head coach position, where the Tigers went undefeated and won a state title in Class C. Kramer brought another undefeated season and state championship to his next head coaching job at Dowagiac High School the following year.

His only unsuccessful high school coaching season came in 1958 when he joined Benton Harbor High School, guiding the team to a 2–7 season. The following season, the team improved to a 7–2 record. Kramer then left to teach at East Lansing High School for five years from 1960 to 1964, ending in a 33–6–1 record and being voted Class A state champions following an 8–0 record in 1964. He was named "Class A Coach of the Year" in Michigan that season.

== College coaching career ==
After coaching high school football for over a decade, Kramer took his first college coaching job with the Central Michigan Chippewas football in 1965, serving as an assistant coach. He would later be signed as head coach after Bill Kelly's retirement. He would go on to coach the team from 1967 until 1977, compiling an 83–32–2 win record.

Kramer's first season with the team was referred to as a "new era" for the team. Kramer hired Herb Deromedi as an assistant coach that season. Deromedi would eventually go from the assistant position to defensive coordinator before taking over head coaching duties when Kramer left the team in 1977.

In 1974, Kramer led the team to a Division II National Championship and was named NCAA National Coach of the Year for his efforts. The team then moved up to Division I the next season, a decision Kramer spearheaded. They also joined the Mid-American Conference that season.

== Administrative career ==
=== Vanderbilt athletic director ===
Kramer left his head coaching position at CMU to become the athletic director at Vanderbilt University in 1978. He was motivated to make the change by his desire to be closer to his family in Tennessee. He served in this role until 1990. As director, Kramer's main initiative was renovating facilities on campus. During his tenure, Vanderbilt Stadium was reconstructed in 1981. He also helped merge the men's and women's athletic departments at Vanderbilt and sold out the SEC Men's Basketball Tournament in 1984.

During this time, Kramer was chairing meetings with other leaders in the NCAA, where he was established as a leader in the conference. This experience lead to him being tapped to be the next commissioner of the SEC.

=== Southeastern Conference ===
Kramer became the sixth commissioner of the Southeastern Conference on January 10, 1990, after a unanimous decision among the presidents of the ten schools in the conference. The conference added the University of Arkansas and the University of South Carolina in 1991 just a few months after the start of Kramer's tenure. Following expansion, Kramer guided the conference to the creation of the first Division I-A conference football championship game. Kramer lead the conference to winning 81 national championships, the most ever in a decade by the league.

In 1997, Kramer oversaw creation of the Bowl Championship Series. This moved college football away from determining the national champion based on an antiquated system of polls. While the system was designed to bring in more revenue, pitting the two best teams of college football against each other, the algorithm designed to decide the match-up was heavily criticized. In a 2002 interview, Kramer jokingly stated that the BCS was "blamed for everything from El Niño to the terrorist attacks."

Kramer retired from his position in 2002. He was succeeded as the SEC's commissioner by Michael Slive. Because of his influence, the Men's and Women's SEC Athlete of the Year award is presented annually as the Roy F. Kramer Award.

== Personal life and death ==
Kramer was married to Sara Jo. He had three children and six grandchildren. His son Steve played football at the University of Miami. Sara Jo died in 2013, with the couple being married for 62 years. Kramer died in Vonore, Tennessee, on December 4, 2025, at the age of 96.

== Awards and honors ==
- 1964 Michigan Class A "Coach of the Year" at East Lansing High
- 1974 Division II national "Coach of the Year"
- 1987 Central Michigan Athletics Hall of Fame inductee
- 1989 Tennessee Sports Hall of Fame inductee
- 1998 Distinguished American Award by the National Football Foundation
- 2003 Alabama Sports Hall of Fame inductee
- 2008 Awarded the Distinguished Eagle Scout Award
- 2008 Vanderbilt Athletics Hall of Fame inductee as part of its inaugural class
- 2011 NCFAA Contribution to College Football Award
- 2013 East Lansing HS Athletics Hall of Fame inductee
- 2013 Awarded the Duffy Daugherty Award

== Head coaching record ==
=== College ===
Year	Team	Overall	Conference	Standing	Bowl/playoffs
Central Michigan Chippewas (Interstate Intercollegiate Athletic Conference) (1967–1969)
1967	Central Michigan	8–2	2–1	1st	
1968	Central Michigan	7–2	2–1	1st	
1969	Central Michigan	7–3	2–1	2nd	
Central Michigan Chippewas (NCAA College Division / Division II independent) (1970–1974)
1970	Central Michigan	7–3			
1971	Central Michigan	5–5			
1972	Central Michigan	5–5–1			
1973	Central Michigan	7–4			
1974	Central Michigan	12–1			W NCAA Division II Championship
Central Michigan Chippewas (Mid-American Conference) (1975–1977)
1975	Central Michigan	8–2–1	4–1–1	2nd	
1976	Central Michigan	7–4	4–3	T–5th	
1977	Central Michigan	10–1	7–1	2nd	
Central Michigan:		83–32–2	21–8–1		
Total:		83–32–2			
National championship Conference title Conference division title or championship game berth
