= 1973 Central Michigan Chippewas football team =

American college football season

1973 Central Michigan Chippewas football
- Conference: Independent
- Record: 7–4
- Head coach: Roy Kramer (7th season)
- Defensive coordinator: Herb Deromedi (5th season)
- MVP: Jim Sandy
- Home stadium: Perry Shorts Stadium

1973 NCAA Division II independents football records
	Conf.			Overall
Team	W	L	T	W		L		T
No. 1 Tennessee State		–		10	–	0	–	0
No. 9 Hawaii		–		9	–	2	–	0
Nebraska–Omaha		–		7	–	2	–	1
Trinity (TX)		–		8	–	3	–	0
UNLV		–		8	–	3	–	0
No. 13 Delaware ^		–		8	–	4	–	0
Western Carolina		–		6	–	3	–	1
Central Michigan		–		7	–	4	–	0
Nevada		–		7	–	4	–	0
Western Illinois		–		7	–	4	–	0
Milwaukee		–		6	–	4	–	1
Eastern Michigan		–		6	–	4	–	0
American International		–		5	–	4	–	0
Akron		–		6	–	5	–	0
Central State (OH)		–		6	–	5	–	0
Ball State		–		5	–	5	–	1
Wayne State (MI)		–		5	–	5	–	0
Drexel		–		4	–	4	–	0
Bucknell		–		3	–	4	–	2
Northeast Louisiana		–		3	–	5	–	2
Illinois State		–		5	–	6	–	0
Santa Clara		–		4	–	6	–	0
Youngstown State		–		4	–	6	–	0
Arkansas–Pine Bluff		–		3	–	5	–	1
Chattanooga		–		4	–	7	–	0
Indiana State		–		4	–	7	–	0
Northeastern		–		3	–	6	–	0
Kentucky State		–		3	–	8	–	0
Northern Michigan		–		2	–	7	–	1
Illinois College		–		2	–	7	–	0
Eastern Illinois		–		2	–	9	–	0
Portland State		–		1	–	10	–	0
^ – NCAA Division II playoff participant; Rankings from AP small college poll

The 1973 Central Michigan Chippewas football team represented Central Michigan University as an independent during the 1973 NCAA Division II football season. In their seventh season under head coach Roy Kramer, the Chippewas compiled a 7–4 record and outscored their opponents, 197 to 151. The team played its home games in Perry Shorts Stadium in Mount Pleasant, Michigan, with attendance of 78,547 in five home games.

The team's statistical leaders included quarterback Mike Franckowiak with 655 passing yards, running back Jim Sandy with 1,168 rushing yards, and Matt Means with 553 receiving yards. Sandy received the team's most valuable player award. George Duranko set a school record with a 100-yard interception return against Eastern Michigan on November 10, 1973.

== Schedule ==
Date	Time	Opponent	Site	Result	Attendance	Source
September 8	1:30 p.m.	Western Michigan	Perry Shorts Stadium; Mount Pleasant, MI (rivalry)	L 13–18	17,417	
September 15		Ball State	Perry Shorts Stadium; Mount Pleasant, MI	W 14–7	14,732	
September 22		at Toledo	Glass Bowl; Toledo, OH	L 21–23	13,128	
September 29		at Dayton	Baujan Field; Dayton, OH	W 15–6	8,237	
October 6		Illinois State	Perry Shorts Stadium; Mount Pleasant, MI	W 6–3	18,822	
October 13		at Indiana State	Memorial Stadium; Terre Haute, IN	W 21–7	11,000	
October 20		at Western Illinois	Hanson Field; Macomb, IL	L 18–24	19,850	
November 3		No. 15 Eastern Michigan	Perry Shorts Stadium; Mount Pleasant, MI (rivalry)	W 31–21	15,907	
November 10		at Eastern Kentucky	Roy Kidd Stadium; Richmond, KY	W 21–7	4,700	
November 17		Northern Michigan	Perry Shorts Stadium; Mount Pleasant, MI	W 30–7	11,669	
November 24	11:00 a.m.	at Kent State	Dix Stadium; Kent, OH	L 7–28	3,870	
Rankings from AP Poll released prior to the game; All times are in Eastern time
