= 1973 Western Illinois Leathernecks football team =

American college football season

1973 Western Illinois Leathernecks football

NCAA Division II Quarterfinal, L 13–18 vs. Louisiana Tech
- Conference: Independent
- Record: 7–4
- Head coach: Darrell Mudra (5th season)
- Home stadium: Hanson Field

1973 NCAA Division II independents football records
	Conf.			Overall
Team	W	L	T	W		L		T
No. 1 Tennessee State		–		10	–	0	–	0
No. 9 Hawaii		–		9	–	2	–	0
Nebraska–Omaha		–		7	–	2	–	1
Trinity (TX)		–		8	–	3	–	0
UNLV		–		8	–	3	–	0
No. 13 Delaware ^		–		8	–	4	–	0
Western Carolina		–		6	–	3	–	1
Central Michigan		–		7	–	4	–	0
Nevada		–		7	–	4	–	0
Western Illinois		–		7	–	4	–	0
Milwaukee		–		6	–	4	–	1
Eastern Michigan		–		6	–	4	–	0
American International		–		5	–	4	–	0
Akron		–		6	–	5	–	0
Central State (OH)		–		6	–	5	–	0
Ball State		–		5	–	5	–	1
Wayne State (MI)		–		5	–	5	–	0
Drexel		–		4	–	4	–	0
Bucknell		–		3	–	4	–	2
Northeast Louisiana		–		3	–	5	–	2
Santa Clara		–		4	–	6	–	0
Youngstown State		–		4	–	6	–	0
Arkansas–Pine Bluff		–		3	–	5	–	1
Chattanooga		–		4	–	7	–	0
Indiana State		–		4	–	7	–	0
Northeastern		–		3	–	6	–	0
Kentucky State		–		3	–	8	–	0
Northern Michigan		–		2	–	7	–	1
Illinois College		–		2	–	7	–	0
Eastern Illinois		–		2	–	9	–	0
Portland State		–		1	–	10	–	0
^ – NCAA Division II playoff participant; Rankings from AP small college poll

The 1973 Western Illinois Leathernecks football team represented Western Illinois University as an independent during the 1973 NCAA Division II football season. They were led by fifth-year head coach Darrell Mudra and played their home games at Hanson Field. The Leathernecks finished the season with a 7–4 record. The team received a bid to the inaugural NCAA Division II Football Championship, where they lost to Louisiana Tech in the quarterfinal.

== Schedule ==
Date	Time	Opponent	Rank	Site	Result	Attendance	Source
September 15		at Northern Iowa		O. R. Latham Stadium; Cedar Falls, IA	L 14–20	5,850	
September 22		Northern Michigan		Hanson Field; Macomb, IL	W 14–10	15,450	
September 29		Milwaukee		Hanson Field; Macomb, IL	W 28–3	9,275	
October 6		No. 4 Eastern Michigan		Hanson Field; Macomb, IL	W 24–21	10,300	
October 13		at Mankato State		Blakeslee Stadium; Mankato, MN	W 34–23	4,100	
October 20		Central Michigan		Hanson Field; Macomb, IL	W 24–18	19,850	
October 27		at Indiana State	No. 14	Memorial Stadium; Terre Haute, IN	L 14–22	4,100	
November 3	1:30 p.m.	at Northern Illinois		Huskie Stadium; DeKalb, IL	W 30–27	12,500–12,750	
November 10		Akron		Hanson Field; Macomb, IL	L 7–12	14,200	
November 17		at Eastern Illinois		O'Brien Field; Charleston, IL	W 56–13	1,500	
December 1		at No. 3 Louisiana Tech		Joe Aillet Stadium; Ruston, LA (NCAA Division II Quarterfinal)	L 13–18	15,200	
Rankings from AP Poll released prior to the game; All times are in Central time
