= 1974 Milwaukee Panthers football team =

American college football season

1974 Milwaukee Panthers football
- Conference: Independent
- Record: 4–6
- Head coach: Glenn Brady (2nd season)
- Home stadium: Marquette Stadium

1974 NCAA Division II independents football records
	Conf.			Overall
Team	W	L	T	W		L		T
No. 1 Central Michigan ^		–		12	–	1	–	0
No. 6 UNLV ^		–		12	–	1	–	0
No. 4 Delaware ^		–		12	–	2	–	0
No. 8 Western Carolina ^		–		9	–	2	–	0
No. 9 Tennessee State		–		8	–	2	–	0
No. 12 Youngstown State ^		–		8	–	2	–	0
Santa Clara		–		7	–	3	–	0
Wayne State (MI)		–		7	–	3	–	0
Ball State		–		6	–	4	–	0
Kentucky State		–		6	–	4	–	0
Northeastern		–		6	–	4	–	0
Central State (OH)		–		6	–	5	–	0
Illinois State		–		6	–	5	–	0
Akron		–		5	–	5	–	0
Illinois College		–		4	–	4	–	0
Indiana State		–		5	–	5	–	0
Nevada		–		5	–	6	–	0
Portland State		–		5	–	6	–	0
American International		–		4	–	5	–	0
Eastern Michigan		–		4	–	6	–	1
Milwaukee		–		4	–	6	–	0
Northeast Louisiana		–		4	–	6	–	0
Eastern Illinois		–		3	–	6	–	1
Arkansas–Pine Bluff		–		3	–	5	–	0
Chattanooga		–		4	–	7	–	0
Nebraska–Omaha		–		3	–	7	–	0
Bucknell		–		2	–	8	–	0
Northern Michigan		–		0	–	10	–	0
^ – NCAA Division II playoff participant; Rankings from AP small college poll

The 1974 Milwaukee Panthers football team represented the University of Wisconsin–Milwaukee as an independent during the 1974 NCAA Division II football season. Led by second-year head coach Glenn Brady, Milwaukee compiled a record of 4–6. The Panthers offense scored 208 points while the defense allowed 170 points.

== Schedule ==
Date	Opponent	Site	Result	Attendance	Source
September 7	Wisconsin–Oshkosh	Marquette Stadium; Milwaukee, WI	L 24–28	10,317	
September 14	at Illinois State	Hancock Stadium; Normal, IL	L 7–24	7,500	
September 21	at Eastern Illinois	O'Brien Stadium; Charleston, IL	W 33–0	8,000	
September 28	Western Illinois	Marquette Stadium; Milwaukee, WI	L 6–18	4,525	
October 12	at Chattanooga	Chamberlain Field; Chattanooga, TN	L 7–43	8,784	
October 19	Nebraska–Omaha	Marquette Stadium; Milwaukee, WI	W 26–7	2,257	
October 26	St. Norbert	Marquette Stadium; Milwaukee, WI	W 53–0	9,572	
November 2	at Wayne State (MI)	Tom Adams Field; Detroit, MI	L 20–22	2,500	
November 9	at North Dakota State	Dacotah Field; Fargo, ND	L 6–14	3,200	
November 16	Wisconsin–Whitewater	Marquette Stadium; Milwaukee, WI	W 26–14	5,130	
