= 1974 Central Michigan Chippewas football team =

American college football season

1974 Central Michigan Chippewas football

NCAA Division II champion; AP small college national champion; Camellia Bowl champion

Camellia Bowl, W 54–14 vs. Delaware
- Conference: Independent
- Record: 12–1
- Head coach: Roy Kramer (8th season)
- Defensive coordinator: Herb Deromedi (6th season)
- MVP: Bruce Marble
- Home stadium: Perry Shorts Stadium

1974 NCAA Division II independents football records
	Conf.			Overall
Team	W	L	T	W		L		T
No. 1 Central Michigan ^		–		12	–	1	–	0
No. 6 UNLV ^		–		12	–	1	–	0
No. 4 Delaware ^		–		12	–	2	–	0
No. 8 Western Carolina ^		–		9	–	2	–	0
No. 9 Tennessee State		–		8	–	2	–	0
No. 12 Youngstown State ^		–		8	–	2	–	0
Santa Clara		–		7	–	3	–	0
Wayne State (MI)		–		7	–	3	–	0
Ball State		–		6	–	4	–	0
Kentucky State		–		6	–	4	–	0
Northeastern		–		6	–	4	–	0
Central State (OH)		–		6	–	5	–	0
Illinois State		–		6	–	5	–	0
Akron		–		5	–	5	–	0
Illinois College		–		4	–	4	–	0
Indiana State		–		5	–	5	–	0
Nevada		–		5	–	6	–	0
Portland State		–		5	–	6	–	0
American International		–		4	–	5	–	0
Eastern Michigan		–		4	–	6	–	1
Milwaukee		–		4	–	6	–	0
Northeast Louisiana		–		4	–	6	–	0
Eastern Illinois		–		3	–	6	–	1
Arkansas–Pine Bluff		–		3	–	5	–	0
Chattanooga		–		4	–	7	–	0
Nebraska–Omaha		–		3	–	7	–	0
Bucknell		–		2	–	8	–	0
Northern Michigan		–		0	–	10	–	0
^ – NCAA Division II playoff participant; Rankings from AP small college poll

The 1974 Central Michigan Chippewas football team was an American football team that represented Central Michigan University as an independent during the 1974 NCAA Division II football season. In their eighth season under head coach Roy Kramer, the Chippewas compiled a 12–1 record, losing the opening game to Kent State and then winning 12 straight games.

In postseason play, they defeated Boise State 20–6 at Perry Shorts Stadium in a Division II quarterfinal, Louisiana Tech 35–14 in the Pioneer Bowl (semifinal) in Texas, and Delaware 54–14 in the Camellia Bowl to win the Division II championship. The team was also later voted number one in the AP's "College Division" poll.

The 1974 Chippewas held 11 of their 13 opponents to 14 or fewer points and outscored all opponents by a combined total of 450 to 127. The team played its home games in Perry Shorts Stadium in Mount Pleasant, Michigan, with attendance of 93,236 in six home games.

The team's statistical leaders included quarterback Mike Franckowiak with 1,262 passing yards (81 of 149 passing), running back Walt Hodges with 1,463 rushing yards (251 carries), and Matt Means with 848 receiving yards (55 receptions). Hodges' 1,463 rushing yards was a Central Michigan record at that time. Franckowiak received the team's most valuable player award.

After the 1974 season, Central Michigan jumped to Division I and joined the Mid-American Conference. In 2004, the 1974 team was inducted as a group into the Central Michigan University Hall of Fame.

== Schedule ==
Date	Opponent	Rank	Site	Result	Attendance	Source
September 7	Kent State		Perry Shorts Stadium; Mount Pleasant, MI	L 14–21	16,825–18,325	
September 14	at Ball State		Ball State Stadium; Muncie, IN	W 24–17	11,318	
September 21	at Northern Michigan		Marquette, MI	W 21–7	3,532	
September 28	Dayton		Perry Shorts Stadium; Mount Pleasant, MI	W 42–8	18,466–18,644	
October 5	at Illinois State		Hancock Stadium; Normal, IL	W 21–14	10,000	
October 12	No. 7 Indiana State		Perry Shorts Stadium; Mount Pleasant, MI	W 49–0	14,795	
October 19	Western Illinois	No. 12	Perry Shorts Stadium; Mount Pleasant, MI	W 58–7	18,907	
November 2	at Eastern Michigan	No. 8	Rynearson Stadium; Ypsilanti, MI (rivalry)	W 28–13	14,000	
November 9	at Western Michigan	No. 8	Waldo Stadium; Kalamazoo, MI (rivalry)	W 42–6	24,235–24,250	
November 16	Southern Illinois	No. 7	Perry Shorts Stadium; Mount Pleasant, MI	W 42–0	12,830	
November 30	No. 4 Boise State	No. 6	Perry Shorts Stadium; Mount Pleasant, MI (NCAA Division II Quarterfinal)	W 20–6	9,913	
December 7	vs. No. 1 Louisiana Tech	No. 6	Memorial Stadium; Wichita Falls, TX (Pioneer Bowl—NCAA Division II Semifinal)	W 35–14	12,200	
December 14	vs. No. 3 Delaware	No. 6	Charles C. Hughes Stadium; Sacramento, CA (Camellia Bowl—NCAA Division II Championship Game)	W 54–14	14,137	
Rankings from AP Poll released prior to the game

== Roster ==
1974 Central Michigan Chippewas football team roster
Players
Coaches
Offense

Pos.	#	Name	Class
QB	4	Mike Franckowiak	Sr
QB		Greg Drypen	Fr
QB		Ronald Rummel	Fr
QB		Thomas Screws	Fr
WR		Gene Harris	Sr
WR		Matthew Means	Sr
WR	28	Dennis Proctor	Sr
WR		John Fossen	Jr
WR		Shawn McCarthy	So
WR		Lonnie Ford	So
RB		Gary Baginski	Sr
RB		Timothy Cashen	Jr
RB		Walter Hodges	So
RB		Mose Rison	Fr
RB		Wayne Schwalbach	Fr
RB		Michael Woroniecki	Jr

Defense

Pos.	#	Name	Class
DB		Tom Ray	Sr

Special teams

Pos.	#	Name	Class

Head coach

- Roy Kramer

Coordinators/assistant coaches

- Herb Deromedi (defense coordinator)
- Chris Allen (offensive line)
- Jesse James (defensive line)
- Dennis Swenson (secondary)

Legend

- (C) Team captain
- (S) Suspended
- (I) Ineligible
- Injured
- Redshirt

Roster
Last update: January 26, 2026

== NFL draft ==
The following players were selected in the 1975 NFL draft following the season.

Player	Position	Round	Pick	Franchise
Mike Franckowiak	Running back	3	54	Denver Broncos
Tom Ray	Defensive back	17	425	Green Bay Packers

== See also ==
- 1974 in Michigan
