= Jerry Scattini =

American football player and coach (born 1941)

Biographical details
- Born: January 30, 1941 (age 85)

Playing career
- 1959–1961: California
- Position: Halfback

Coaching career (HC unless noted)
- 1969–1975: Nevada

Head coaching record
- Overall: 37–36–1

Jerrold Peter Scattini (born January 30, 1941) is an American former college football coach. He served as the head coach at the University of Nevada, Reno from 1969 to 1975. He amassed a 37–36–1 record during his tenure.

Scattini attended the University of California, Berkeley, where he played on the football team from 1959 to 1961 as a halfback. In 1960, The Los Angeles Times characterized Scattini as California's best runner. That same season, The Baltimore Sun noted that all three California halfbacks "are good-size but lack breakaway speed" and quoted coach Marv Levy as saying that the offense centered on the quarterback.

After college, the Green Bay Packers of the National Football League selected Scattini in the 19th round of the 1962 NFL draft as the 266th overall pick.

The University of Nevada, Reno hired Scattini as its head football coach, a position he held from 1969 to 1975. His teams compiled a 37–36–1 record. Scattini was fired in December 1975 after a 3–8 season and was replaced with UNLV assistant Chris Ault. After football, Scattini entered business in finance.

== Head coaching record ==
Year	Team	Overall	Conference	Standing	Bowl/playoffs
Nevada Wolf Pack (NCAA College Division / Division II independent) (1969–1975)
1969	Nevada	5–5			
1970	Nevada	6–3–1			
1971	Nevada	5–5			
1972	Nevada	6–5			
1973	Nevada	7–4			
1974	Nevada	5–6			
1975	Nevada	3–8			
Nevada:		37–36–1			
Total:		37–36–1			
