= 1973 Eastern Michigan Hurons football team =

American college football season

1973 Eastern Michigan Hurons football
- Conference: Independent
- Record: 6–4
- Head coach: Dan Boisture (7th season)
- Defensive coordinator: Doug Graber (2nd season)
- Captains: David Boone; Jim Grace; Frank Alley
- Home stadium: Rynearson Stadium

1973 NCAA Division II independents football records
| | Conf. | | | Overall |
| Team | W | L | T | W | | L | | T |
|---|---|---|---|---|---|---|---|---|
| No. 1 Tennessee State | | – | | 10 | – | 0 | – | 0 |
| No. 9 Hawaii | | – | | 9 | – | 2 | – | 0 |
| Nebraska–Omaha | | – | | 7 | – | 2 | – | 1 |
| Trinity (TX) | | – | | 8 | – | 3 | – | 0 |
| UNLV | | – | | 8 | – | 3 | – | 0 |
| No. 13 Delaware ^ | | – | | 8 | – | 4 | – | 0 |
| Western Carolina | | – | | 6 | – | 3 | – | 1 |
| Central Michigan | | – | | 7 | – | 4 | – | 0 |
| Nevada | | – | | 7 | – | 4 | – | 0 |
| Western Illinois | | – | | 7 | – | 4 | – | 0 |
| Milwaukee | | – | | 6 | – | 4 | – | 1 |
| Eastern Michigan | | – | | 6 | – | 4 | – | 0 |
| American International | | – | | 5 | – | 4 | – | 0 |
| Akron | | – | | 6 | – | 5 | – | 0 |
| Central State (OH) | | – | | 6 | – | 5 | – | 0 |
| Ball State | | – | | 5 | – | 5 | – | 1 |
| Wayne State (MI) | | – | | 5 | – | 5 | – | 0 |
| Drexel | | – | | 4 | – | 4 | – | 0 |
| Bucknell | | – | | 3 | – | 4 | – | 2 |
| Northeast Louisiana | | – | | 3 | – | 5 | – | 2 |
| Santa Clara | | – | | 4 | – | 6 | – | 0 |
| Youngstown State | | – | | 4 | – | 6 | – | 0 |
| Arkansas–Pine Bluff | | – | | 3 | – | 5 | – | 1 |
| Chattanooga | | – | | 4 | – | 7 | – | 0 |
| Indiana State | | – | | 4 | – | 7 | – | 0 |
| Northeastern | | – | | 3 | – | 6 | – | 0 |
| Kentucky State | | – | | 3 | – | 8 | – | 0 |
| Northern Michigan | | – | | 2 | – | 7 | – | 1 |
| Illinois College | | – | | 2 | – | 7 | – | 0 |
| Eastern Illinois | | – | | 2 | – | 9 | – | 0 |
| Portland State | | – | | 1 | – | 10 | – | 0 |
^ – NCAA Division II playoff participant; Rankings from AP small college poll

The 1973 Eastern Michigan Hurons football team represented Eastern Michigan University as an independent during the 1973 NCAA Division II football season. In their seventh and final season under head coach Dan Boisture, the Hurons compiled a 6–4 record and outscored their opponents, 265 to 190. The team's victories included games against Louisiana Tech (21–19), Youngstown State (42–2), and Weber State (44–7).

In February 1974, coach Boisture left Eastern Michigan to coach the Detroit Wheels in the World Football League. The Wheels shared Rynearson Stadium with the Hurons during the 1974 season, compiled a 1–13 record, and folded before the season had ended.

== Schedule ==
| Date | Time | Opponent | Rank | Site | Result | Attendance | Source |
|---|---|---|---|---|---|---|---|
| September 8 | | Ball State | | Rynearson Stadium; Ypsilanti, MI | W 17–14 | 8,500–9,200 | |
| September 15 | | Louisiana Tech | | Rynearson Stadium; Ypsilanti, MI | W 21–19 | 9,300 | |
| September 22 | | at Indiana State | No. 6 | Memorial Stadium; Terre Haute, IN | W 25–14 | 14,220 | |
| September 29 | | St. Norbert | No. 5 | Rynearson Stadium; Ypsilanti, MI | W 47–14 | 6,500 | |
| October 6 | | at Western Illinois | No. 4 | Hanson Field; Macomb, IL | L 21–24 | 10,300 | |
| October 20 | 1:30 p.m. | at Kent State | No. 12 | Dix Stadium; Kent, OH | L 20–34 | 14,406–14,426 | |
| October 27 | | Youngstown State^{†} | | Rynearson Stadium; Ypsilanti, MI | W 42–2 | 12,500 | |
| November 3 | | at Central Michigan | No. 15 | Perry Shorts Stadium; Mount Pleasant, MI (rivalry) | L 21–31 | 15,907 | |
| November 10 | 1:30 p.m. | at Bowling Green | | Doyt Perry Stadium; Bowling Green, OH | L 7–31 | 14,216–14,219 | |
| November 22 | | Weber State | | Rynearson Stadium; Ypsilanti, MI | W 44–7 | 2,500 | |
^{†}Homecoming; Rankings from AP Poll released prior to the game; All times are in Eastern time

== After the season ==
The following Hurons were selected in the 1974 NFL draft after the season.

| Round | Pick | Player | Position | NFL club |
|---|---|---|---|---|
| 6 | 132 | Jim Pietrzak | Tackle | New York Giants |
| 11 | 285 | Dave Boone | Defensive end | Minnesota Vikings |
| 13 | 333 | Frank Kolch | Quarterback | Pittsburgh Steelers |
