= Glenn Brady =

American football and baseball coach (1935–2019)

Biographical details
- Born: September 30, 1935; Liberty, Texas, U.S.
- Died: February 3, 2019 (aged 83); Clinton, Louisiana, U.S.
- Education: LSU

Playing career

Football
- c. 1957: Stephen F. Austin
- Position: Fullback

Coaching career (HC unless noted)

Football
- c. 1960: University HS (LA) (assistant)
- c. 1961: Darling Prep (GA) (assistant)
- c. 1962: St. James HS (LA)
- 1963–1964: Hammond HS (LA)
- 1965: New Mexico State (assistant)
- 1968–1971: Western Illinois (assistant)
- 1972: Chadron State
- 1973–1974: Milwaukee
- 1976–1977: Sacramento State

Baseball
- 1977: Sacramento State

Head coaching record
- Overall: 20–30–2 (college football); 9–33 (college baseball)

Glenn Martin "Doc" Brady (September 30, 1935 – February 3, 2019) was an American football and baseball coach. He served as the head football coach at Chadron State College in Chadron, Nebraska (1972), the University of Wisconsin–Milwaukee (1973–1974), and California State University, Sacramento (1976–1977), compiling a career college football coaching record of 20–30–2. Brady was also the head baseball coach at Sacramento State in 1977, tallying a mark of 9–33.

A native of Clinton, Louisiana, Brady lettered in football and track at Stephen F. Austin State College—now known as Stephen F. Austin State University. He earned a master's degree and a PhD at Louisiana State University (LSU).

== Head coaching record ==
=== College football ===
Year	Team	Overall	Conference	Standing	Bowl/playoffs
Chadron State Eagles (Nebraska College Conference) (1972)
1972	Chadron State	8–2	2–1	2nd	
Chadron State:		8–2	2–1		
Milwaukee Panthers (NCAA Division II independent) (1973–1974)
1973	Milwaukee	6–4–1			
1974	Milwaukee	4–6			
Milwaukee:		10–10–1			
Sacramento State Hornets (Far Western Conference) (1976–1977)
1976	Sacramento State	2–8	2–3	T–3rd	
1977	Sacramento State	0–10–1	0–4–1	6th	
Sacramento State:		2–18–1	2–7–1		
Total:		20–30–2			
