= 1973 Northeast Louisiana Indians football team =

American college football season

1973 Northeast Louisiana Indians football
- Conference: Independent
- Record: 3–5–2
- Head coach: Ollie Keller (2nd season)
- Home stadium: Brown Stadium

1973 NCAA Division II independents football records
	Conf.			Overall
Team	W	L	T	W		L		T
No. 1 Tennessee State		–		10	–	0	–	0
No. 9 Hawaii		–		9	–	2	–	0
Nebraska–Omaha		–		7	–	2	–	1
Trinity (TX)		–		8	–	3	–	0
UNLV		–		8	–	3	–	0
No. 13 Delaware ^		–		8	–	4	–	0
Western Carolina		–		6	–	3	–	1
Central Michigan		–		7	–	4	–	0
Nevada		–		7	–	4	–	0
Western Illinois		–		7	–	4	–	0
Milwaukee		–		6	–	4	–	1
Eastern Michigan		–		6	–	4	–	0
American International		–		5	–	4	–	0
Akron		–		6	–	5	–	0
Central State (OH)		–		6	–	5	–	0
Ball State		–		5	–	5	–	1
Wayne State (MI)		–		5	–	5	–	0
Drexel		–		4	–	4	–	0
Bucknell		–		3	–	4	–	2
Northeast Louisiana		–		3	–	5	–	2
Santa Clara		–		4	–	6	–	0
Youngstown State		–		4	–	6	–	0
Arkansas–Pine Bluff		–		3	–	5	–	1
Chattanooga		–		4	–	7	–	0
Indiana State		–		4	–	7	–	0
Northeastern		–		3	–	6	–	0
Kentucky State		–		3	–	8	–	0
Northern Michigan		–		2	–	7	–	1
Eastern Illinois		–		2	–	9	–	0
Portland State		–		1	–	10	–	0
^ – NCAA Division II playoff participant; Rankings from AP small college poll

The 1973 Northeast Louisiana Indians football team was an American football team that represented Northeast Louisiana University (now known as the University of Louisiana at Monroe) as an independent during the 1973 NCAA Division II football season. In their second year under head coach Ollie Keller, the team compiled a 3–5–2 record.

== Schedule ==
Date	Opponent	Site	Result	Attendance	Source
September 8	Troy State	Brown Stadium; Monroe, LA	T 15–15	8,350–8,400	
September 15	at Mississippi State	Scott Field; Starkville, MS	T 21–21	25,000–26,000	
September 29	at Northwestern State	Demon Stadium; Natchitoches, LA (rivalry)	W 16–13	9,500–10,000	
October 6	at UNLV	Las Vegas Stadium; Whitney, NV	L 0–26	8,623	
October 13	McNeese State	Brown Stadium; Monroe, LA	L 6–16	5,500	
October 20	Southeastern Louisiana	Brown Stadium; Monroe, LA	L 0–17	8,200	
October 27	Richmond	Brown Stadium; Monroe, LA	W 14–8	7,000	
November 3	at Jacksonville State	Paul Snow Stadium; Jacksonville, AL	L 24–66	10,400–13,000	
November 10	Nicholls State	Brown Stadium; Monroe, LA	W 37–0	7,800	
November 17	at Louisiana Tech	Joe Aillet Stadium; Ruston, LA (rivalry)	L 0–40	16,840–16,850	
