= 1973 Nevada Wolf Pack football team =

American college football season

1973 Nevada Wolf Pack football
- Conference: Independent
- Record: 7–4
- Head coach: Jerry Scattini (5th season)
- Home stadium: Mackay Stadium

1973 NCAA Division II independents football records
	Conf.			Overall
Team	W	L	T	W		L		T
No. 1 Tennessee State		–		10	–	0	–	0
No. 9 Hawaii		–		9	–	2	–	0
Nebraska–Omaha		–		7	–	2	–	1
Trinity (TX)		–		8	–	3	–	0
UNLV		–		8	–	3	–	0
No. 13 Delaware ^		–		8	–	4	–	0
Western Carolina		–		6	–	3	–	1
Central Michigan		–		7	–	4	–	0
Nevada		–		7	–	4	–	0
Western Illinois		–		7	–	4	–	0
Milwaukee		–		6	–	4	–	1
Eastern Michigan		–		6	–	4	–	0
American International		–		5	–	4	–	0
Akron		–		6	–	5	–	0
Central State (OH)		–		6	–	5	–	0
Ball State		–		5	–	5	–	1
Wayne State (MI)		–		5	–	5	–	0
Drexel		–		4	–	4	–	0
Bucknell		–		3	–	4	–	2
Northeast Louisiana		–		3	–	5	–	2
Santa Clara		–		4	–	6	–	0
Youngstown State		–		4	–	6	–	0
Arkansas–Pine Bluff		–		3	–	5	–	1
Chattanooga		–		4	–	7	–	0
Indiana State		–		4	–	7	–	0
Northeastern		–		3	–	6	–	0
Kentucky State		–		3	–	8	–	0
Northern Michigan		–		2	–	7	–	1
Eastern Illinois		–		2	–	9	–	0
Portland State		–		1	–	10	–	0
^ – NCAA Division II playoff participant; Rankings from AP small college poll

The 1973 Nevada Wolf Pack football team represented the University of Nevada, Reno as an independent during the 1973 NCAA Division II football season. Led by fifth-year head coach Jerry Scattini, the Wolf Pack compiled a record of 7–4. The team played home games at Mackay Stadium in Reno, Nevada.

== Schedule ==
Date	Opponent	Site	Result	Attendance	Source
September 8	at San Francisco State	Cox Stadium; San Francisco, CA	L 28–31	1,000	
September 15	Sacramento State	Mackay Stadium; Reno, NV	W 17–10	4,200	
September 22	at Chico State	University Stadium; Chico, CA	W 33–3	3,200	
September 29	Idaho State	Mackay Stadium; Reno, NV	W 38–14	5,000	
October 6	at Portland State	Civic Stadium; Portland, OR	W 59–0	500	
October 13	at Santa Clara	Buck Shaw Stadium; Santa Clara, CA	L 14–27	7,200–7,840	
October 20	at Cal State Northridge	North Campus Stadium; Northridge, CA	W 48–0	1,000–2,000	
October 27	Cal State Fullerton^{†}	Mackay Stadium; Reno, NV	L 10–17	7,100–7,130	
November 3	No. 9 Boise State	Mackay Stadium; Reno, NV (rivalry)	W 23–21	3,111–3,200	
November 10	at UC Davis	Toomey Field; Davis, CA	L 6–17	7,000	
November 17	No. 9 UNLV	Mackay Stadium; Reno, NV (Fremont Cannon)	W 19–3	7,014	
^{†}Homecoming; Rankings from AP Poll released prior to the game
