= 1974 Eastern Michigan Hurons football team =

American college football season

1974 Eastern Michigan Hurons football
- Conference: Independent
- Record: 4–6–1
- Head coach: George Mans (1st season)
- Defensive coordinator: Doug Graber (3rd season)
- Captains: John Banaszak; Mike Nally
- Home stadium: Rynearson Stadium

1974 NCAA Division II independents football records
	Conf.			Overall
Team	W	L	T	W		L		T
No. 1 Central Michigan ^		–		12	–	1	–	0
No. 6 UNLV ^		–		12	–	1	–	0
No. 4 Delaware ^		–		12	–	2	–	0
No. 8 Western Carolina ^		–		9	–	2	–	0
No. 9 Tennessee State		–		8	–	2	–	0
No. 12 Youngstown State ^		–		8	–	2	–	0
Santa Clara		–		7	–	3	–	0
Wayne State (MI)		–		7	–	3	–	0
Ball State		–		6	–	4	–	0
Kentucky State		–		6	–	4	–	0
Northeastern		–		6	–	4	–	0
Central State (OH)		–		6	–	5	–	0
Akron		–		5	–	5	–	0
Illinois College		–		4	–	4	–	0
Indiana State		–		5	–	5	–	0
Nevada		–		5	–	6	–	0
Portland State		–		5	–	6	–	0
American International		–		4	–	5	–	0
Eastern Michigan		–		4	–	6	–	1
Milwaukee		–		4	–	6	–	0
Northeast Louisiana		–		4	–	6	–	0
Eastern Illinois		–		3	–	6	–	1
Arkansas–Pine Bluff		–		3	–	5	–	0
Chattanooga		–		4	–	7	–	0
Nebraska–Omaha		–		3	–	7	–	0
Bucknell		–		2	–	8	–	0
Northern Michigan		–		0	–	10	–	0
^ – NCAA Division II playoff participant; Rankings from AP small college poll

The 1974 Eastern Michigan Hurons football team represented Eastern Michigan University as an independent during the 1974 NCAA Division II football season. In their first season under head coach George Mans, the Hurons compiled a 4–6–1 record and were outscored by their opponents, 178 to 143.

Mans had been an assistant football coach at the University of Michigan since 1966. He was hired by Eastern Michigan in February 1974. In his first season as head coach, the Hurons started the season with only one win in the first four games, but the team finished strong, going 3–2–1 in the final five games. The team's victories were against Western Michigan (20–19), Northern Michigan (24–0), Ball State (17–9), and Toledo (28–12).

== Schedule ==
Date	Opponent	Site	Result	Attendance	Source
September 7	at Miami (OH)	Miami Field; Oxford, OH	L 0–39	6,700	
September 14	Western Michigan	Rynearson Stadium; Ypsilanti, MI	W 28–20	9,600	
September 21	Northeast Louisiana	Rynearson Stadium; Ypsilanti, MI	L 14–17	7,100	
September 28	Kent State ^{†}	Rynearson Stadium; Ypsilanti, MI	L 0–13	12,000	
October 5	at Arkansas State	Indian Stadium; Jonesboro, AR	L 7–14		
October 12	at McNeese State	Cowboy Stadium; Lake Charles, LA	T 6–6	9,000	
October 19	at Northern Michigan	Memorial Field; Marquette, MI	W 24–0		
October 26	Ball State	Rynearson Stadium; Ypsilanti, MI	W 17–9	6,000	
November 2	No. 8 Central Michigan	Rynearson Stadium; Ypsilanti, MI (rivalry)	L 13–28	14,000	
November 16	at Weber State	Wildcat Stadium; Ogden, UT	L 14–21	4,064	
November 23	at Toledo	Glass Bowl; Toledo, OH	W 28–12	9,894	
^{†}Homecoming; Rankings from AP Poll released prior to the game

== After the season ==
The following Huron was selected in the 1975 NFL draft after the season.

Round	Pick	Player	Position	NFL club
14	363	Mike Strickland	Running back	Minnesota Vikings

== See also ==
- 1974 in Michigan
