= 1973 UNLV Rebels football team =

American college football season

1973 UNLV Rebels football
- Conference: Independent
- Record: 8–3
- Head coach: Ron Meyer (1st season)
- Offensive coordinator: Larry Kennan (1st season)
- Home stadium: Las Vegas Stadium

1973 NCAA Division II independents football records
	Conf.			Overall
Team	W	L	T	W		L		T
No. 1 Tennessee State		–		10	–	0	–	0
No. 9 Hawaii		–		9	–	2	–	0
Nebraska–Omaha		–		7	–	2	–	1
Trinity (TX)		–		8	–	3	–	0
UNLV		–		8	–	3	–	0
No. 13 Delaware ^		–		8	–	4	–	0
Western Carolina		–		6	–	3	–	1
Central Michigan		–		7	–	4	–	0
Nevada		–		7	–	4	–	0
Western Illinois		–		7	–	4	–	0
Milwaukee		–		6	–	4	–	1
Eastern Michigan		–		6	–	4	–	0
American International		–		5	–	4	–	0
Akron		–		6	–	5	–	0
Central State (OH)		–		6	–	5	–	0
Ball State		–		5	–	5	–	1
Wayne State (MI)		–		5	–	5	–	0
Drexel		–		4	–	4	–	0
Bucknell		–		3	–	4	–	2
Northeast Louisiana		–		3	–	5	–	2
Santa Clara		–		4	–	6	–	0
Youngstown State		–		4	–	6	–	0
Arkansas–Pine Bluff		–		3	–	5	–	1
Chattanooga		–		4	–	7	–	0
Indiana State		–		4	–	7	–	0
Northeastern		–		3	–	6	–	0
Kentucky State		–		3	–	8	–	0
Northern Michigan		–		2	–	7	–	1
Eastern Illinois		–		2	–	9	–	0
Portland State		–		1	–	10	–	0
^ – NCAA Division II playoff participant; Rankings from AP small college poll

The 1973 UNLV Rebels football team was an American football team that represented the University of Nevada, Las Vegas as an independent during the 1973 NCAA Division II football season. In their first year under head coach Ron Meyer, the team compiled an 8–3 record, a significant improvement over the previous season (one victory).

The Rebels played eight games at Las Vegas Stadium; general admission tickets were $2.50, reserved seats were $4.50, and season tickets were thirty dollars.

== Schedule ==
Date	Time	Opponent	Rank	Site	Result	Attendance	Source
September 9		State College of Arkansas		Las Vegas Stadium; Whitney, NV	W 38–6	7,854	
September 15		Cal State Los Angeles		Las Vegas Stadium; Whitney, NV	W 42–7	7,023	
September 21	8:15 p.m.	Marshall		Las Vegas Stadium; Whitney, NV	W 31–9	9,186	
September 29		Utah State		Las Vegas Stadium; Whitney, NV	L 3–7	12,486	
October 6		Northeast Louisiana		Las Vegas Stadium; Whitney, NV	W 26–0	8,623	
October 13		No. 5 Boise State		Las Vegas Stadium; Whitney, NV	W 24–19	12,642	
October 20		Milwaukee^{†}	No. 13	Las Vegas Stadium; Whitney, NV	W 35–24	11,738	
October 27		at No. 3 Hawaii	No. 12	Honolulu Stadium; Honolulu, HI	L 29–31	23,011	
November 3		at Santa Clara	No. 12	Buck Shaw Stadium; Santa Clara, CA	W 31–15	6,310	
November 10		Northern Arizona	No. 9	Las Vegas Stadium; Whitney, NV	W 42–14	12,124	
November 17		at Nevada	No. 9	Mackay Stadium; Reno, NV (Fremont Cannon)	L 3–19	7,014	
^{†}Homecoming; Rankings from AP Poll released prior to the game; All times are in Pacific time
