= 1973 Hawaii Rainbows football team =

American college football season

1973 Hawaii Rainbows football
- Conference: Independent

Ranking
- AP: No. 9
- Record: 9–2
- Head coach: Dave Holmes (6th season)
- Home stadium: Honolulu Stadium

1973 NCAA Division II independents football records
	Conf.			Overall
Team	W	L	T	W		L		T
No. 1 Tennessee State		–		10	–	0	–	0
No. 9 Hawaii		–		9	–	2	–	0
Nebraska–Omaha		–		7	–	2	–	1
Trinity (TX)		–		8	–	3	–	0
UNLV		–		8	–	3	–	0
No. 13 Delaware ^		–		8	–	4	–	0
Western Carolina		–		6	–	3	–	1
Central Michigan		–		7	–	4	–	0
Nevada		–		7	–	4	–	0
Western Illinois		–		7	–	4	–	0
Milwaukee		–		6	–	4	–	1
Eastern Michigan		–		6	–	4	–	0
American International		–		5	–	4	–	0
Akron		–		6	–	5	–	0
Central State (OH)		–		6	–	5	–	0
Ball State		–		5	–	5	–	1
Wayne State (MI)		–		5	–	5	–	0
Drexel		–		4	–	4	–	0
Bucknell		–		3	–	4	–	2
Northeast Louisiana		–		3	–	5	–	2
Santa Clara		–		4	–	6	–	0
Youngstown State		–		4	–	6	–	0
Arkansas–Pine Bluff		–		3	–	5	–	1
Chattanooga		–		4	–	7	–	0
Indiana State		–		4	–	7	–	0
Northeastern		–		3	–	6	–	0
Kentucky State		–		3	–	8	–	0
Northern Michigan		–		2	–	7	–	1
Eastern Illinois		–		2	–	9	–	0
Portland State		–		1	–	10	–	0
^ – NCAA Division II playoff participant; Rankings from AP small college poll

The 1973 Hawaii Rainbows football team represented the University of Hawaiʻi at Mānoa as an independent during the 1973 NCAA Division II football season. In their sixth season under head coach Dave Holmes, the Rainbows compiled a 9–2 record.

== Schedule ==
Date	Time	Opponent	Rank	Site	Result	Attendance	Source
September 15		at Washington		Husky Stadium; Seattle, WA	W 10–7	52,500	
September 22	4:31 p.m.	at Fresno State	No. T–11	Ratcliffe Stadium; Fresno, CA (rivalry)	W 13–10	8,416–8,686	
September 29		Texas Southern	No. 6	Honolulu Stadium; Honolulu, HI	W 24–21	23,500	
October 6		Cal State Los Angeles	No. 6	Honolulu Stadium; Honolulu, HI	W 16–9	23,015	
October 20		Puget Sound	No. 4	Honolulu Stadium; Honolulu, HI	W 30–7	23,000	
October 27		UNLV	No. 3	Honolulu Stadium; Honolulu, HI	W 31–29	23,011	
November 3		Cal State Northridge^{†}	No. 2	Honolulu Stadium; Honolulu, HI	W 28–3	19,281	
November 10		Santa Clara	No. 2	Honolulu Stadium; Honolulu, HI	W 40–9	22,987	
November 17	7:30 p.m.	Pacific (CA)	No. 2	Honolulu Stadium; Honolulu, HI	L 3–28	23,206	
November 24	8:03 p.m.	San Jose State	No. T–6	Honolulu Stadium; Honolulu, HI (rivalry)	L 3–23	20,777	
December 1		Utah	No. 11	Honolulu Stadium; Honolulu, HI	W 7–6	15,662	
^{†}Homecoming; Rankings from AP Poll released prior to the game; All times are in Hawaii–Aleutian time
