= 1974 Chattanooga Moccasins football team =

American college football season

1974 Chattanooga Moccasins football
- Conference: Independent
- Record: 4–7
- Head coach: Joe Morrison (2nd season)
- Home stadium: Chamberlain Field

1974 NCAA Division II independents football records
	Conf.			Overall
Team	W	L	T	W		L		T
No. 1 Central Michigan ^		–		12	–	1	–	0
No. 6 UNLV ^		–		12	–	1	–	0
No. 4 Delaware ^		–		12	–	2	–	0
No. 8 Western Carolina ^		–		9	–	2	–	0
No. 9 Tennessee State		–		8	–	2	–	0
No. 12 Youngstown State ^		–		8	–	2	–	0
Santa Clara		–		7	–	3	–	0
Wayne State (MI)		–		7	–	3	–	0
Ball State		–		6	–	4	–	0
Kentucky State		–		6	–	4	–	0
Northeastern		–		6	–	4	–	0
Central State (OH)		–		6	–	5	–	0
Akron		–		5	–	5	–	0
Indiana State		–		5	–	5	–	0
Nevada		–		5	–	6	–	0
Portland State		–		5	–	6	–	0
American International		–		4	–	5	–	0
Eastern Michigan		–		4	–	6	–	1
Milwaukee		–		4	–	6	–	0
Northeast Louisiana		–		4	–	6	–	0
Eastern Illinois		–		3	–	6	–	1
Arkansas–Pine Bluff		–		3	–	5	–	0
Chattanooga		–		4	–	7	–	0
Nebraska–Omaha		–		3	–	7	–	0
Bucknell		–		2	–	8	–	0
Northern Michigan		–		0	–	10	–	0
^ – NCAA Division II playoff participant; Rankings from AP small college poll

The 1974 Chattanooga Moccasins football team was an American football team that represented the University of Tennessee at Chattanooga during the 1974 NCAA Division II football season. In their second year under head coach Joe Morrison, the team compiled a 4–7 record.

== Schedule ==
Date	Opponent	Site	Result	Attendance	Source
September 7	Tampa	Chamberlain Field; Chattanooga, TN	L 0–28	7,500	
September 14	at Vanderbilt	Dudley Field; Nashville, TN	L 6–28	19,900	
September 21	at Auburn	Jordan–Hare Stadium; Auburn, AL	L 7–52	42,000	
October 5	at Middle Tennessee	Horace Jones Field; Murfreesboro, TN	W 24–7	10,000	
October 12	Milwaukee^{†}	Chamberlain Field; Chattanooga, TN	W 34–7	8,784	
October 19	Jacksonville State	Chamberlain Field; Chattanooga, TN	W 13–9	9,328	
October 26	at Southwestern Louisiana	Cajun Field; Lafayette, LA	L 20–21	18,856	
November 2	at Tennessee State	Hale Stadium; Nashville, TN	L 0–17	13,000–14,000	
November 9	Minnesota Morris	Chamberlain Field; Chattanooga, TN	W 41–13	6,113	
November 16	No. 1 Louisiana Tech	Chamberlain Field; Chattanooga, TN	L 14–35	6,327	
November 23	at Cincinnati	Nippert Stadium; Cincinnati, OH	L 20–35	5,793	
^{†}Homecoming; Rankings from AP Poll released prior to the game
