= 1974 Northeast Louisiana Indians football team =

American college football season

1974 Northeast Louisiana Indians football
- Conference: Independent
- Record: 4–6
- Head coach: Ollie Keller (3rd season)
- Home stadium: Brown Stadium

1974 NCAA Division II independents football records
	Conf.			Overall
Team	W	L	T	W		L		T
No. 1 Central Michigan ^		–		12	–	1	–	0
No. 6 UNLV ^		–		12	–	1	–	0
No. 4 Delaware ^		–		12	–	2	–	0
No. 8 Western Carolina ^		–		9	–	2	–	0
No. 9 Tennessee State		–		8	–	2	–	0
No. 12 Youngstown State ^		–		8	–	2	–	0
Santa Clara		–		7	–	3	–	0
Wayne State (MI)		–		7	–	3	–	0
Ball State		–		6	–	4	–	0
Kentucky State		–		6	–	4	–	0
Northeastern		–		6	–	4	–	0
Central State (OH)		–		6	–	5	–	0
Akron		–		5	–	5	–	0
Indiana State		–		5	–	5	–	0
Nevada		–		5	–	6	–	0
Portland State		–		5	–	6	–	0
American International		–		4	–	5	–	0
Eastern Michigan		–		4	–	6	–	1
Milwaukee		–		4	–	6	–	0
Northeast Louisiana		–		4	–	6	–	0
Eastern Illinois		–		3	–	6	–	1
Arkansas–Pine Bluff		–		3	–	5	–	0
Chattanooga		–		4	–	7	–	0
Nebraska–Omaha		–		3	–	7	–	0
Bucknell		–		2	–	8	–	0
Northern Michigan		–		0	–	10	–	0
^ – NCAA Division II playoff participant; Rankings from AP small college poll

The 1974 Northeast Louisiana Indians football team was an American football team that represented Northeast Louisiana University (now known as the University of Louisiana at Monroe) as an independent during the 1974 NCAA Division II football season. In their third year under head coach Ollie Keller, the team compiled a 4–6 record.

== Schedule ==
Date	Opponent	Site	Result	Attendance	Source
September 14	at Troy State	Veterans Memorial Stadium; Troy, AL	L 19–30	7,000	
September 21	at Eastern Michigan	Rynearson Stadium; Ypsilanti, MI	W 17–14	7,100	
September 28	at No. 5 McNeese State	Cowboy Stadium; Lake Charles, LA	L 14–20	11,500	
October 5	Northwestern State	Brown Stadium; Monroe, LA (rivalry)	W 14–8	8,400	
October 26	at Southeastern Louisiana	Strawberry Stadium; Hammond, LA	L 8–23	9,000	
November 2	at Arkansas State	Indian Stadium; Jonesboro, AR	L 14–17	10,384	
November 9	Jacksonville State	Brown Stadium; Monroe, LA	W 20–16	8,200	
November 16	North Dakota	Brown Stadium; Monroe, LA	W 39–15	4,000	
November 23	No. 1 Louisiana Tech	Brown Stadium; Monroe, LA (rivalry)	L 10–26	9,000	
November 30	at Cincinnati	Nippert Stadium; Cincinnati, OH	L 7–20	9,332	
Rankings from AP Poll released prior to the game
