= 1973 Tennessee State Tigers football team =

American college football season

1973 Tennessee State Tigers football

Black college football national champion; AP small college national champion; UPI small college national champion
- Conference: Independent
- Record: 10–0
- Head coach: John Merritt (11th season)
- Home stadium: Hale Stadium

1973 NCAA Division II independents football records
	Conf.			Overall
Team	W	L	T	W		L		T
No. 1 Tennessee State		–		10	–	0	–	0
No. 9 Hawaii		–		9	–	2	–	0
Nebraska–Omaha		–		7	–	2	–	1
Trinity (TX)		–		8	–	3	–	0
UNLV		–		8	–	3	–	0
No. 13 Delaware ^		–		8	–	4	–	0
Western Carolina		–		6	–	3	–	1
Central Michigan		–		7	–	4	–	0
Nevada		–		7	–	4	–	0
Western Illinois		–		7	–	4	–	0
Milwaukee		–		6	–	4	–	1
Eastern Michigan		–		6	–	4	–	0
American International		–		5	–	4	–	0
Akron		–		6	–	5	–	0
Central State (OH)		–		6	–	5	–	0
Ball State		–		5	–	5	–	1
Wayne State (MI)		–		5	–	5	–	0
Drexel		–		4	–	4	–	0
Bucknell		–		3	–	4	–	2
Northeast Louisiana		–		3	–	5	–	2
Santa Clara		–		4	–	6	–	0
Youngstown State		–		4	–	6	–	0
Arkansas–Pine Bluff		–		3	–	5	–	1
Chattanooga		–		4	–	7	–	0
Indiana State		–		4	–	7	–	0
Northeastern		–		3	–	6	–	0
Kentucky State		–		3	–	8	–	0
Northern Michigan		–		2	–	7	–	1
Eastern Illinois		–		2	–	9	–	0
Portland State		–		1	–	10	–	0
^ – NCAA Division II playoff participant; Rankings from AP small college poll

The 1973 Tennessee State Tigers football team represented Tennessee State University as an independent during the 1973 NCAA Division II football season. In their 11th season, under head coach John Merritt, the Tigers compiled a 10–0 record and outscored all opponents by a total of 333 to 87. The team was also recognized as the 1973 black college national champion, and was ranked No. 1 in the final small college rankings issued by both the Associated Press and the United Press International.

Tennessee State did not compete in the playoffs "because five of its starters would not be eligible to play." The players in question had sat out their freshman year ("redshirt") and then played four seasons; under NCAA rules at the time, such players were not eligible for postseason play as fifth-year seniors.

== Schedule ==
Date	Opponent	Rank	Site	Result	Attendance	Source
September 8	vs. Middle Tennessee		Dudley Field; Nashville, TN	W 23–0	22,000–27,000	
September 15	at Alabama A&M		Milton Frank Stadium; Huntsville, AL	W 54–21	18,000	
September 22	at Texas Southern	No. 3	Jeppesen Stadium; Houston, TX	W 23–20	15,500	
October 6	No. 2 Grambling	No. 7	Hale Stadium; Nashville, TN	W 19–13	16,000–16,500	
October 13	at Virginia State	No. 2	Rogers Stadium; Ettrick, VA	W 24–6	15,000	
October 20	Florida A&M	No. 2	Dudley Field; Nashville, TN	W 45–0	27,000	
October 27	at Southern	No. 1	University Stadium; Baton Rouge, LA	W 21–6	20,000	
November 3	Chattanooga	No. 1	Chamberlain Field; Chattanooga, TN	W 44–7	11,524	
November 10	Central State (OH)	No. 1	Hale Stadium; Nashville, TN	W 45–7	11,700	
November 17	Alabama State	No. 1	Hale Stadium; Nashville, TN	W 35–7	10,000	
Rankings from AP Poll released prior to the game
