= 1974 Tennessee State Tigers football team =

American college football season

1974 Tennessee State Tigers football
- Conference: Independent
- Record: 8–2
- Head coach: John Merritt (12th season)
- Home stadium: Hale Stadium

1974 NCAA Division II independents football records
	Conf.			Overall
Team	W	L	T	W		L		T
No. 1 Central Michigan ^		–		12	–	1	–	0
No. 6 UNLV ^		–		12	–	1	–	0
No. 4 Delaware ^		–		12	–	2	–	0
No. 8 Western Carolina ^		–		9	–	2	–	0
No. 9 Tennessee State		–		8	–	2	–	0
No. 12 Youngstown State ^		–		8	–	2	–	0
Santa Clara		–		7	–	3	–	0
Wayne State (MI)		–		7	–	3	–	0
Ball State		–		6	–	4	–	0
Kentucky State		–		6	–	4	–	0
Northeastern		–		6	–	4	–	0
Central State (OH)		–		6	–	5	–	0
Akron		–		5	–	5	–	0
Indiana State		–		5	–	5	–	0
Nevada		–		5	–	6	–	0
Portland State		–		5	–	6	–	0
American International		–		4	–	5	–	0
Eastern Michigan		–		4	–	6	–	1
Milwaukee		–		4	–	6	–	0
Northeast Louisiana		–		4	–	6	–	0
Eastern Illinois		–		3	–	6	–	1
Arkansas–Pine Bluff		–		3	–	5	–	0
Chattanooga		–		4	–	7	–	0
Nebraska–Omaha		–		3	–	7	–	0
Bucknell		–		2	–	8	–	0
Northern Michigan		–		0	–	10	–	0
^ – NCAA Division II playoff participant; Rankings from AP small college poll

The 1974 Tennessee State Tigers football team represented Tennessee State University as an independent during the 1974 NCAA Division II football season. In their 12th year under head coach John Merritt, the team compiled an overall record of 8–2.

== Schedule ==
Date	Opponent	Rank	Site	Result	Attendance	Source
September 7	vs. Middle Tennessee		Dudley Field; Nashville, TN	L 10–20	14,000–17,000	
September 13	vs. Central State (OH)		Soldier Field; Chicago, IL	W 44–12	14,000–23,000	
September 21	Alabama A&M	No. 7	Hale Stadium; Nashville, TN	W 36–0	12,000	
September 28	Texas Southern	No. 8	Hale Stadium; Nashville, TN	W 27–6	14,000	
October 5	vs. No. 6 Arkansas–Pine Bluff		Memphis Memorial Stadium; Memphis, TN	Canceled		
October 12	at No. 12 Grambling State	No. 5	Grambling Stadium; Grambling, LA	L 7–21	15,582	
October 19	at Virginia Union	No. 14	City Stadium; Richmond, VA	W 10–0	7,000–17,000	
October 26	at Florida A&M	No. 13	Doak Campbell Stadium; Tallahassee, FL	W 17–14	25,000	
November 2	Chattanooga	No. 13	Hale Stadium; Nashville, TN	W 17–0	13,000–14,000	
November 9	at Alabama State	No. 11	Cramton Bowl; Montgomery, AL	W 56–0	8,000	
November 16	Virginia State	No. 12	Hale Stadium; Nashville, TN	W 41–0	4,500	
Rankings from AP Poll released prior to the game
