= 1973 Delaware Fightin' Blue Hens football team =

American college football season

1973 Delaware Fightin' Blue Hens football

Lambert Cup co-champion

Boardwalk Bowl, L 8–17 vs. Grambling
- Conference: Independent
- Record: 8–4
- Head coach: Tubby Raymond (8th season)
- Offensive coordinator: Ted Kempski (6th season)
- Offensive scheme: Delaware Wing-T
- Base defense: 5–2
- Home stadium: Delaware Stadium

1973 NCAA Division II independents football records
| | Conf. | | | Overall |
| Team | W | L | T | W | | L | | T |
|---|---|---|---|---|---|---|---|---|
| No. 1 Tennessee State | | – | | 10 | – | 0 | – | 0 |
| No. 9 Hawaii | | – | | 9 | – | 2 | – | 0 |
| Nebraska–Omaha | | – | | 7 | – | 2 | – | 1 |
| Trinity (TX) | | – | | 8 | – | 3 | – | 0 |
| UNLV | | – | | 8 | – | 3 | – | 0 |
| No. 13 Delaware ^ | | – | | 8 | – | 4 | – | 0 |
| Western Carolina | | – | | 6 | – | 3 | – | 1 |
| Central Michigan | | – | | 7 | – | 4 | – | 0 |
| Nevada | | – | | 7 | – | 4 | – | 0 |
| Western Illinois | | – | | 7 | – | 4 | – | 0 |
| Milwaukee | | – | | 6 | – | 4 | – | 1 |
| Eastern Michigan | | – | | 6 | – | 4 | – | 0 |
| American International | | – | | 5 | – | 4 | – | 0 |
| Akron | | – | | 6 | – | 5 | – | 0 |
| Central State (OH) | | – | | 6 | – | 5 | – | 0 |
| Ball State | | – | | 5 | – | 5 | – | 1 |
| Wayne State (MI) | | – | | 5 | – | 5 | – | 0 |
| Drexel | | – | | 4 | – | 4 | – | 0 |
| Bucknell | | – | | 3 | – | 4 | – | 2 |
| Northeast Louisiana | | – | | 3 | – | 5 | – | 2 |
| Santa Clara | | – | | 4 | – | 6 | – | 0 |
| Youngstown State | | – | | 4 | – | 6 | – | 0 |
| Arkansas–Pine Bluff | | – | | 3 | – | 5 | – | 1 |
| Chattanooga | | – | | 4 | – | 7 | – | 0 |
| Indiana State | | – | | 4 | – | 7 | – | 0 |
| Northeastern | | – | | 3 | – | 6 | – | 0 |
| Kentucky State | | – | | 3 | – | 8 | – | 0 |
| Northern Michigan | | – | | 2 | – | 7 | – | 1 |
| Eastern Illinois | | – | | 2 | – | 9 | – | 0 |
| Portland State | | – | | 1 | – | 10 | – | 0 |
^ – NCAA Division II playoff participant; Rankings from AP small college poll

The 1973 Delaware Fightin' Blue Hens football team represented the University of Delaware as an independent during the 1973 NCAA Division II football season. The Hens completed the 85th season of Delaware football, and their first as members of the reorganized NCAA Division II. The Hens played their home games in at Delaware Stadium in Newark, Delaware. The 1973 team was led by coach Tubby Raymond. The team finished the regular season with an 8–3 record and made the inaugural NCAA Division II playoffs. However, the Hens lost to Grambling, 17–8, in the first round, the Boardwalk Bowl.

== Schedule ==
| Date | Time | Opponent | Rank | Site | Result | Attendance | Source |
|---|---|---|---|---|---|---|---|
| September 8 | | Akron | | Delaware Stadium; Newark, DE | W 45–24 | 18,610 | |
| September 15 | | West Chester | | Delaware Stadium; Newark, DE (rivalry) | W 49–14 | 18,444 | |
| September 22 | | Gettysburg | No. 1 | Delaware Stadium; Newark, DE | W 60–18 | 15,949 | |
| September 29 | | at Lehigh | No. 1 | Taylor Stadium; Bethlehem, PA (rivalry) | W 21–9 | 14,500 | |
| October 6 | | Baldwin–Wallace | No. 1 | Delaware Stadium; Newark, DE | W 56–18 | 16,849 | |
| October 13 | | Connecticut^{†} | No. 1 | Delaware Stadium; Newark, DE | W 35–7 | 20,751 | |
| October 20 | | at Rutgers | No. 1 | Rutgers Stadium; Piscataway, NJ | L 7–24 | 21,000 | |
| October 27 | | Temple | No. 2 | Delaware Stadium; Newark, DE | L 8–31 | 23,619 | |
| November 3 | 1:30 p.m. | at Villanova | No. 10 | Villanova Stadium; Villanova, PA (rivalry) | L 7–24 | 14,810 | |
| November 10 | | at Maine | No. 14 | Alumni Stadium; Orono, ME | W 28–12 | 2,200 | |
| November 17 | | at Bucknell | No. 14 | Memorial Stadium; Lewisburg, PA | W 50–0 | 8,500 | |
| December 1 | | vs. No. 5 Grambling | No. 12 | Atlantic City Convention Center; Atlantic City, NJ (Boardwalk Bowl—NCAA Division II Quarterfinal) | L 8–17 | 12,043 | |
^{†}Homecoming; Rankings from AP Poll released prior to the game; All times are in Eastern time
