= 1973 Fisk Bulldogs football team =

American college football season

1973 Fisk Bulldogs football

SIAC Division II champion
- Conference: Southern Intercollegiate Athletic Conference
- Division II
- Record: 9–0 (5–0 SIAC)
- Head coach: Samuel Whitmon (5th season)
- Home stadium: Fisk Athletic Field

1973 Southern Intercollegiate Athletic Conference football standings
	Conf.					Overall
Team	W		L		T	W		L		T
Division I
Bethune–Cookman x	5	–	0	–	0	9	–	2	–	0
Florida A&M	4	–	1	–	0	5	–	6	–	0
No. 16 Albany State	3	–	2	–	0	6	–	3	–	1
Alabama A&M	3	–	2	–	0	5	–	5	–	0
Tuskegee	2	–	3	–	0	7	–	4	–	0
Morris Brown	1	–	4	–	0	1	–	8	–	1
Alabama State	0	–	5	–	0	3	–	8	–	0
Division II
No. 7 Fisk x	5	–	0	–	0	9	–	0	–	0
Fort Valley State	4	–	1	–	0	7	–	1	–	1
Clark (GA)	4	–	1	–	0	4	–	3	–	1
Morehouse	3	–	2	–	0	4	–	3	–	1
Savannah State	2	–	3	–	0	3	–	6	–	0
Lane	1	–	4	–	0	3	–	6	–	0
Miles	1	–	4	–	0	1	–	8	–	0
Knoxville	0	–	5	–	0	0	–	8	–	0
x – Division champion/co-champions; Rankings from NAIA Division II poll

The 1973 Fisk Bulldogs football team was an American football team that represented Fisk University as a member of the Division II of the Southern Intercollegiate Athletic Conference (SIAC) during the 1973 NAIA Division II football season. In their fifth season under head coach Samuel Whitmon, the Bulldogs compiled a perfect 9–0 record (5–0 against SIAC opponents) and outscored all opponents by a total of 233 to 58.

The team played its home games at Fisk Athletic Field in Nashville, Tennessee.

== Schedule ==
Date	Opponent	Site	Result	Attendance	Source
September 15	Miles	Fisk Athletic Field; Nashville, TN	W 32–0		
September 22	Clark Atlanta	Fisk Athletic Field; Nashville, TN	W 30–3	3,500	
September 29	Savannah State	Fisk Athletic Field; Nashville, TN	W 30–0		
October 13	Alabama A&M	Fisk Athletic Field; Nashville, TN	W 29–24	2,100	
October 20	at Alabama State	Cramton Bowl; Montgomery, AL	W 7–3		
October 27	at Knoxville	Knoxville, TN	W 22–7		
November 3	at Lane	Jackson, TN	W 21–6	9,000	
November 10	Fort Valley State	Fisk Athletic Field; Nashville, TN	W 27–12	5,000	
November 17	at Morehouse	Atlanta, GA	W 35–3		
