= Mid-America Classic =

American college football rivalry

- Illinois State Redbirds Eastern Illinois Panthers
- Sport: Football
- First meeting: November 25, 1901; Eastern Illinois, 28–0
- Latest meeting: September 19, 2026; Illinois State, 49–13
- Next meeting: September 18, 2027
- Stadiums: Hancock Stadium; O'Brien Field
- Trophy: Mid-America Classic Trophy

Statistics
- Total meetings: 114
- All-time series: Illinois State; 62–43–9
- Largest victory: Illinois State; 48–7 (1992)
- Longest win streak: Eastern Illinois; 8 (1924–1931)
- Longest unbeaten streak: Illinois State; 13 (1932–1946)
- Current win streak: Illinois State; 3 (2024–present)

Locations of Illinois State and Eastern Illinois

The Mid-America Classic is a long-standing American college football rivalry game played in most years since 1901 between the Redbirds of Illinois State University and the Panthers of Eastern Illinois University. The 2026 season marked the 114th meeting between the two teams. Illinois State leads the series, 62–43–9.

== History ==
The rivalry between the two schools began in 1901 and is the oldest in the state of Illinois. It has continued almost completely uninterrupted through the years as the Redbirds and the Panthers played in the Illinois Intercollegiate Athletic Conference until it disbanded in 1970. They would play in different conferences until 1985 when they both joined the newly formed football arm of the Gateway Collegiate Athletic Conference, previously a league that sponsored only women's sports. After the Gateway merged with the Missouri Valley Conference in 1992, its football side was spun off into the Gateway Football Conference (now the Missouri Valley Football Conference), with both teams remaining in that league until the Panthers moved their entire athletic program to the Ohio Valley Conference in 1995. Even though annual meetings are no longer assured, the two sides have met almost every year since, including twice in 2006. The two teams have played 113 times in total, with Illinois State holding a 61–43–9 advantage in the all-time series.

For the 100th game in the series, in 2012, representatives from the two schools met and decided to give the rivalry the name of Mid-America Classic. The two schools also collaborated on a traveling trophy, which holds plaques with the results of the previous one hundred games in the series and has room for results of future games.

The schools are separated by eighty-two miles.

== Notable games ==
October 27, 1906 – Illinois State's six-hour bus drive to Charleston, Ill., was only made worse by an 11–6 defeat.

November 3, 1915 – Both teams fumbled inside each other's 10-yard line in this 0–0 game played at EIU.

November 11, 1916 – EIU visited Normal, Ill., for the first ever Homecoming game on Illinois State's campus. ISU scored its only points on a 45-yard blocked punt by Ritter in a 24–7 loss.

November 5, 1921 – ISU rolled to a 42–3 victory in its Homecoming game, as five different ISU players scored a touchdown (Brown, Stewart, Clark, Jensen, Frkyman).

November 14, 1959 – Illinois State linemen wear gloves for the first time on a snowy, icy day, as Dave Babcock scored the only Illinois State touchdown in a 6–6 tie.

September 30, 1961 – Illinois State's Keith Reiger's touchdown pass to Bill Monken "probably set an IIAC record for the shortest TD pass: 18 inches" in the Redbirds' 18–0 win.

September 29, 1962 – Paul Whitmore's 91-yard punt return was the only score in this 6–0 Redbird victory. It still remains the longest punt return for a touchdown in Illinois State history.

October 10, 1981 – ISU reserve Andy Fladung came off the bench to intercept a school-record four passes in the Redbirds' 25–3 win.

September 16, 2006 – Marked the first time in the history of the Illinois State-Eastern Illinois series where both teams were nationally ranked. The Redbirds entered the game No. 7 and Panthers were ranked No. 18. ISU trailed, 10–0, after the first quarter, but a 23-point second quarter put the 'Birds in control of a 44–30 win. Pierre Jackson had a career-high 132 receiving yards on six catches.

November 25, 2006 – Two months after facing each other in the regular season, ISU and EIU met each other in the first round of the 2006 NCAA Division I FCS Playoffs. ISU's Jason Tate (41 yards) and Jesse Caesar (45 yards) each returned interceptions for touchdowns in the 24–13 Redbird win.

September 15, 2012 – Matt Brown accounted for seven touchdowns, and his fifth scoring pass of the game, a 25-yarder to Tyrone Walker in the second overtime period, capped a career-high 473-yard performance and gave Illinois State a 54–51 victory over Eastern Illinois.

== Game results ==
Illinois State victories	Eastern Illinois victories	Tie games

No.	Date	Location	Winner	Score
1	November 25, 1901	Neutral	Eastern Illinois	28–0
2	November 3, 1905	Charleston	Illinois State	6–4
3	October 27, 1906	Charleston	Eastern Illinois	11–6
4	November 16, 1907	Normal	Tie	6–6
5	October 17, 1908	Bloomington	Illinois State	31–0
6	November 16, 1912	Normal	Eastern Illinois	32–3
7	November 15, 1913	Charleston	Eastern Illinois	26–7
8	November 14, 1914	Normal	Eastern Illinois	13–6
9	November 3, 1915	Charleston	Tie	0–0
10	November 11, 1916	Normal	Eastern Illinois	24–7
11	November 17, 1917	Charleston	Eastern Illinois	13–7
12	November 6, 1920	Charleston	Illinois State	20–7
13	November 5, 1921	Normal	Illinois State	42–3
14	November 4, 1922	Charleston	Tie	0–0
15	November 2, 1923	Bloomington	Illinois State	13–0
16	November 1, 1924	Charleston	Eastern Illinois	3–0
17	October 31, 1925	Normal	Eastern Illinois	7–0
18	November 25, 1926	Charleston	Eastern Illinois	12–0
19	October 1, 1927	Normal	Eastern Illinois	6–0
20	November 10, 1928	Charleston	Eastern Illinois	19–0
21	September 20, 1929	Normal	Eastern Illinois	33–0
22	October 4, 1930	Charleston	Eastern Illinois	15–0
23	November 4, 1931	Normal	Eastern Illinois	7–6
24	October 8, 1932	Normal	Illinois State	39–0
25	October 14, 1933	Charleston	Illinois State	32–6
26	November 9, 1934	Normal	Illinois State	13–0
27	October 19, 1935	Charleston	Illinois State	13–0
28	October 24, 1936	Normal	Illinois State	13–0
29	October 23, 1937	Charleston	Tie	0–0
30	October 22, 1938	Normal	Illinois State	19–0
31	October 21, 1939	Charleston	Tie	0–0
32	October 19, 1940	Normal	Illinois State	30–12
33	October 18, 1941	Charleston	Illinois State	26–7
34	October 17, 1942	Normal	Illinois State	32–0
35	November 10, 1945	Normal	Illinois State	12–6
36	October 26, 1946	Charleston	Illinois State	26–13
37	October 25, 1947	Charleston	Eastern Illinois	13–6
38	October 23, 1948	Normal	Eastern Illinois	13–7
39	October 8, 1949	Charleston	Eastern Illinois	7–6
40	October 14, 1950	Normal	Illinois State	23–21
41	November 10, 1951	Normal	Tie	28–28
42	November 15, 1952	Charleston	Illinois State	27–26
43	November 14, 1953	Normal	Illinois State	20–0
44	November 13, 1954	Charleston	Illinois State	13–7
45	October 8, 1955	Normal	Illinois State	16–13
46	October 6, 1956	Charleston	Eastern Illinois	14–6
47	November 9, 1957	Normal	Illinois State	39–7
48	November 8, 1958	Charleston	Eastern Illinois	20–12
49	November 14, 1959	Normal	Tie	6–6
50	November 12, 1960	Charleston	Illinois State	26–6
51	September 30, 1961	Normal	Illinois State	18–0
52	September 29, 1962	Charleston	Illinois State	6–0
53	October 12, 1963	Normal	Eastern Illinois	14–13
54	October 17, 1964	Charleston	Illinois State	25–23
55	October 9, 1965	Normal	Eastern Illinois	8–7
56	October 8, 1966	Charleston	Tie	0–0
57	October 14, 1967	Charleston	Illinois State	28–6
58	October 12, 1968	Normal	Illinois State	41–14
59	October 18, 1969	Normal	Illinois State	37–0

No.	Date	Location	Winner	Score
60	October 17, 1970	Charleston	Illinois State	29–20
61	October 9, 1971	Normal	Illinois State	17–6
62	October 7, 1972	Charleston	Illinois State	38–11
63	October 20, 1973	Normal	Illinois State	17–0
64	October 19, 1974	Charleston	Eastern Illinois	14–9
65	November 22, 1975	Charleston	Illinois State	31–13
66	November 20, 1976	Charleston	Illinois State	13–8
67	September 3, 1977	Normal	Illinois State	20–0
68	November 4, 1978	Charleston	Eastern Illinois	42–7
69	November 10, 1979	Normal	Eastern Illinois	24–0
70	October 4, 1980	Charleston	Eastern Illinois	31–14
71	October 10, 1981	Normal	Illinois State	25–3
72	September 9, 1982	Charleston	Eastern Illinois	27–14
73	September 3, 1983	Normal	Eastern Illinois	38–7
74	October 6, 1984	Charleston	Illinois State	34–21
75	October 21, 1985	Charleston	Eastern Illinois	21–14
76	August 30, 1986	Normal	Illinois State	23–20
77	September 19, 1987	Charleston	Eastern Illinois	15–9
78	September 3, 1988	Normal	Eastern Illinois	16–7
79	September 30, 1989	Charleston	Eastern Illinois	14–13
80	September 29, 1990	Normal	Illinois State	28–7
81	October 19, 1991	Charleston	Eastern Illinois	37–28
82	September 26, 1992	Normal	Illinois State	48–7
83	October 23, 1993	Charleston	Tie	17–17
84	November 5, 1994	Normal	Eastern Illinois	16–13
85	October 28, 1995	Charleston	Eastern Illinois	32–10
86	September 27, 1997	Normal	Eastern Illinois	25–14
87	October 17, 1998	Charleston	Illinois State	36–22
88	September 13, 1999	Charleston	Illinois State	24–17
89	September 11, 2000	Normal	Illinois State	44–41 ^{2OT}
90	September 28, 2002	Charleston	Eastern Illinois	45–10
91	September 20, 2003	Charleston	Illinois State	21–14
92	September 18, 2004	Normal	Illinois State	35–31
93	September 17, 2005	Charleston	Illinois State	27–6
94	September 16, 2006	Normal	Illinois State	44–30
95	November 25, 2006	Charleston	Illinois State	24–13
96	September 15, 2007	Charleston	Illinois State	24–21
97	September 20, 2008	Normal	Eastern Illinois	25–21
98	September 3, 2009	Charleston	Eastern Illinois	31–6
99	November 13, 2010	Normal	Illinois State	27–23
100	September 1, 2011	Charleston	Eastern Illinois	33–26
101	September 15, 2012	Normal	Illinois State	54–51 ^{2OT}
102	September 14, 2013	Charleston	Eastern Illinois	57–24
103	September 13, 2014	Normal	Illinois State	34–15
104	September 20, 2015	Charleston	Illinois State	34–31 ^{OT}
105	September 17, 2016	Normal	Eastern Illinois	24–21
106	September 16, 2017	Charleston	Illinois State	44–13
107	September 8, 2018	Normal	Illinois State	48–10
108	September 14, 2019	Charleston	Illinois State	21–3
109	September 18, 2021	Charleston	Illinois State	31–24
110	September 17, 2022	Normal	Illinois State	35–7
111	September 16, 2023	Charleston	Eastern Illinois	14–13
112	September 21, 2024	Normal	Illinois State	31–7
113	September 13, 2025	Charleston	Illinois State	42–30
114	September 19, 2026	Normal	Illinois State	49–13
115	September 18, 2027	Charleston		
116	September 2, 2028	Normal		
Series: Illinois State leads 62–43–9

== See also ==
- List of most-played college football series in NCAA Division I
- List of NCAA college football rivalry games
