= Hanson Field =

Stadium in Illinois, USA

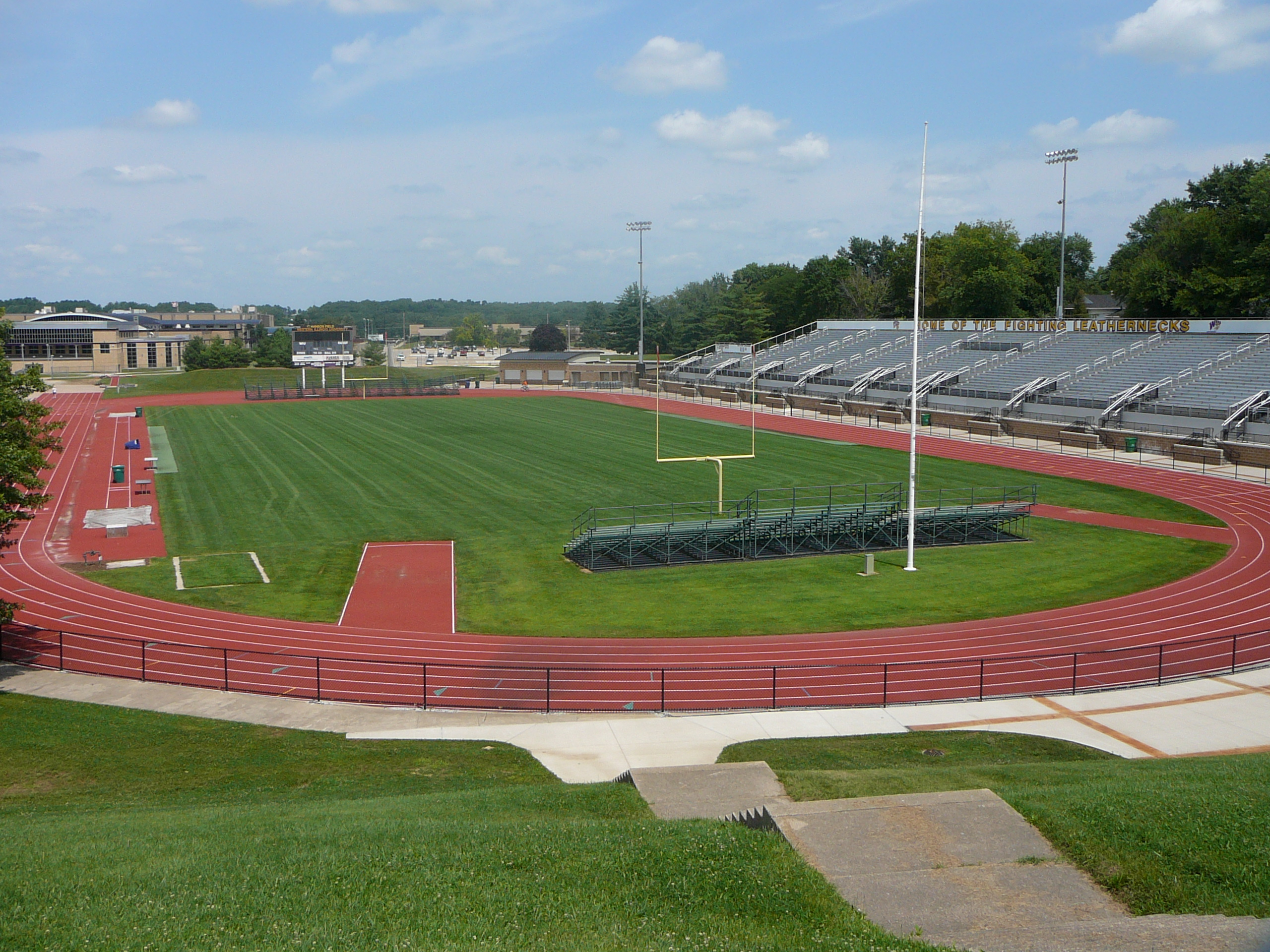
- Interactive map of Hanson Field
- Location: Macomb, Illinois
- Coordinates: 40°28′06″N 90°41′03″W
- Owner: Western Illinois University
- Operator: Western Illinois University
- Capacity: 16,368
- Surface: Matrix Turf
- Record attendance: 19,850 (October 20, 1973 vs. Central Michigan)

Construction
- Opened: 1950
- Expanded: 2007

Tenant
- Western Illinois Leathernecks (NCAA) (1950-present)

Hanson Field is a 16,368-seat multi-purpose stadium in Macomb, Illinois, US. The stadium which opened in 1950 is home to the Western Illinois Leathernecks football team and track and field team. The field is named after former WIU football coach/A.D. and Marine legend Rock Hanson. A unique feature of the facility is an extensive hillside that surrounds the field allowing for additional seating for thousands of spectators. Outside the stadium, a statue of former WIU track and field coach and two-time Olympic gold medalist Lee Calhoun stands and a bulldog statue is located at the main entrance.

== History ==
A record crowd of 19,850 watched the Leathernecks defeat Central Michigan, October 20, 1973.

From 1996 through 2004, Hanson Field was the training camp home of the National Football League's St. Louis Rams.

Highest-Scoring Game
On September 11, 2004, Western Illinois defeated Division II Cheyney State 98–7.

=== Renovations ===
In 2001, the main entrance of the stadium was renovated by adding an iron gate, brick pillars and an arch displaying the words, Hanson Field. The stadium's east side received a $5 million face lift prior to the 2007 season. The renovation to the student seating section, funded largely by a facilities enhancement and life safety fee at the request of student leaders, included new bleachers, increased seating capacity, a new entrance, restrooms and concession stands.

In 2011, Matrix Turf was installed on the field.

=== Colts Drum and Bugle Corp Summer Camp ===
Hanson field of WIU has been home to the Colts' summer training camp for a number of years. The nine-time Drum Corps International (DCI) World Class Finalist, from Dubuque, IA are a group of 160 high school- and college-aged musicians, plus 40 staff members and support team members. They train, work and live on the WIU campus for three weeks. Members live in the residence halls and practice at Hanson Field.

== See also ==
- List of NCAA Division I FCS football stadiums
