= 1973 NCAA Division II football season =

American college football season

- Regular season: September – November 1973
- Playoffs: December 1–15
- National championship: Camellia Bowl; Hughes Stadium; Sacramento, California
- Champion: Louisiana Tech

The 1973 NCAA Division II football season, part of college football in the United States organized by the National Collegiate Athletic Association at the Division II level. The season began in September and concluded with the Division II Championship on December 15 at Hughes Stadium in Sacramento, California. This was the first season for Division II (and Division III) football, which were formerly in the College Division in 1972 and prior.

Louisiana Tech won their first Division II championship, defeating Western Kentucky 34–0 in the Camellia Bowl championship game.

== Conference realignment ==
=== Membership changes ===
School	1972 Conference	1973 Conference
Akron	Independent	D-II Independent
Ball State	Independent	D-II Independent
Eastern Michigan	Independent	D-II Independent
Illinois State	Independent	D-II Independent
Nevada–Reno	Independent	D-II Independent

== Conference standings ==
1973 Big Sky Conference football standings
	Conf.					Overall
Team	W		L		T	W		L		T
No. 5 Boise State $^	6	–	0	–	0	10	–	3	–	0
Montana State	5	–	1	–	0	7	–	4	–	0
Idaho	3	–	2	–	0	4	–	7	–	0
Northern Arizona	2	–	3	–	0	4	–	6	–	0
Montana	2	–	4	–	0	4	–	6	–	0
Weber State	2	–	4	–	0	3	–	8	–	0
Idaho State	0	–	6	–	0	2	–	9	–	0
$ – Conference champion; ^ – NCAA Division II playoff participant; Idaho was classified as Division I. All the other teams were classified as Division II.; Rankings from AP small college poll

1973 California Collegiate Athletic Association football standings
	Conf.					Overall
Team	W		L		T	W		L		T
No. 8/9 Cal Poly $	4	–	0	–	0	9	–	1	–	0
UC Riverside	3	–	1	–	0	8	–	2	–	0
Cal State Fullerton	1	–	3	–	0	7	–	4	–	0
Cal Poly Pomona	1	–	3	–	0	4	–	6	–	1
Cal State Northridge	1	–	3	–	0	2	–	9	–	0
$ – Conference champion; Rankings from AP/UPI small college polls

1973 Central Intercollegiate Athletic Association football standings
	Conf.					Overall
Team	W		L		T	W		L		T
Virginia Union $	9	–	0	–	0	9	–	1	–	0
Livingstone	5	–	2	–	0	7	–	2	–	1
Norfolk State	5	–	3	–	0	5	–	5	–	0
Johnson C. Smith	3	–	2	–	0	7	–	4	–	0
Virginia State	3	–	2	–	0	5	–	5	–	0
Elizabeth City State	4	–	4	–	1	4	–	5	–	1
Fayetteville State	4	–	4	–	0	5	–	5	–	0
Winston-Salem State	2	–	5	–	1	3	–	7	–	1
Hampton	1	–	5	–	1	1	–	7	–	2
Shaw	1	–	5	–	1	1	–	6	–	1
Saint Paul's (VA)	1	–	6	–	0	1	–	9	–	0
$ – Conference champion

1973 Eastern Football Conference football standings
	Conf.					Overall
Team	W		L		T	W		L		T
Central Connecticut State $	3	–	0	–	0	9	–	1	–	0
Southern Connecticut State	2	–	1	–	0	6	–	4	–	0
Montclair State	1	–	2	–	0	6	–	4	–	0
Glassboro State	0	–	3	–	0	4	–	6	–	0
$ – Conference champion

1973 Far Western Conference football standings
	Conf.					Overall
Team	W		L		T	W		L		T
UC Davis +	4	–	1	–	0	7	–	3	–	0
Chico State +	4	–	1	–	0	7	–	3	–	0
San Francisco State	3	–	2	–	0	7	–	2	–	1
Cal State Hayward	3	–	2	–	0	3	–	7	–	0
Humboldt State	1	–	4	–	0	2	–	6	–	2
Sacramento State	0	–	5	–	0	1	–	9	–	0
+ – Conference co-champions

1973 Gulf South Conference football standings
	Conf.					Overall
Team	W		L		T	W		L		T
No. T–17 Troy State $	6	–	1	–	0	7	–	2	–	1
No. 4 Jacksonville State	5	–	2	–	0	7	–	2	–	0
Delta State	6	–	3	–	0	8	–	3	–	0
Livingston	4	–	3	–	1	6	–	3	–	1
Northwestern State	3	–	4	–	0	5	–	6	–	0
Mississippi College	3	–	4	–	0	4	–	6	–	0
Southeastern Louisiana	3	–	4	–	0	4	–	6	–	0
Florence State	3	–	6	–	0	4	–	6	–	0
Nicholls State	2	–	7	–	0	2	–	9	–	0
Tennessee–Martin	1	–	5	–	1	2	–	8	–	1
$ – Conference champion; Rankings from NAIA Division I poll

1973 Indiana Collegiate Conference football standings
	Conf.					Overall
Team	W		L		T	W		L		T
Butler $	5	–	1	–	0	5	–	5	–	0
DePauw	4	–	2	–	0	6	–	3	–	0
Evansville	3	–	2	–	0	5	–	5	–	0
Indiana Central	3	–	3	–	0	7	–	3	–	0
Valparaiso	3	–	3	–	0	6	–	5	–	0
Saint Joseph's (IN)	1	–	4	–	0	3	–	7	–	0
Wabash	0	–	4	–	0	5	–	5	–	0
$ – Conference champion

1973 Mid-Eastern Athletic Conference football standings
	Conf.					Overall
Team	W		L		T	W		L		T
North Carolina Central $	5	–	1	–	0	7	–	4	–	0
South Carolina State	4	–	1	–	1	7	–	3	–	1
Howard	4	–	2	–	0	8	–	2	–	0
Morgan State	4	–	2	–	0	6	–	3	–	0
Maryland Eastern Shore	2	–	4	–	0	4	–	5	–	0
North Carolina A&T	1	–	4	–	1	4	–	6	–	1
Delaware State	0	–	6	–	0	0	–	11	–	0
$ – Conference champion

1973 Missouri Intercollegiate Athletic Association football standings
	Conf.					Overall
Team	W		L		T	W		L		T
SE Missouri State $	5	–	1	–	0	6	–	4	–	0
NW Missouri State	4	–	2	–	0	6	–	4	–	0
Lincoln (MO)	3	–	3	–	0	5	–	6	–	0
SW Missouri State	3	–	3	–	0	3	–	7	–	0
Missouri–Rolla	2	–	3	–	1	3	–	6	–	2
NE Missouri State	2	–	3	–	1	2	–	7	–	2
Central Missouri State	1	–	5	–	0	2	–	8	–	0
$ – Conference champion

1973 North Central Conference football standings
	Conf.					Overall
Team	W		L		T	W		L		T
No. 14 North Dakota State +	6	–	1	–	0	8	–	2	–	0
No. 11 South Dakota +^	6	–	1	–	0	8	–	3	–	0
Mankato State	4	–	3	–	0	7	–	4	–	0
North Dakota	4	–	3	–	0	6	–	4	–	0
Augustana (SD)	3	–	3	–	1	6	–	3	–	1
South Dakota State	2	–	4	–	1	5	–	5	–	1
Northern Iowa	2	–	5	–	0	5	–	5	–	0
Morningside	0	–	7	–	0	0	–	9	–	0
+ – Conference co-champions; ^ – NCAA Division II playoff participant; Rankings from AP small college poll

1973 Northern Intercollegiate Conference football standings
	Conf.					Overall
Team	W		L		T	W		L		T
Moorhead State $	5	–	1	–	0	7	–	3	–	0
Michigan Tech	4	–	2	–	0	5	–	4	–	1
St. Cloud State	4	–	2	–	0	4	–	6	–	0
Bemidji State	2	–	4	–	0	5	–	4	–	0
Southwest State (MN)	2	–	4	–	0	4	–	6	–	0
Minnesota Morris	2	–	4	–	0	3	–	6	–	0
Winona State	2	–	4	–	0	3	–	7	–	0
$ – Conference champion

1973 Ohio Valley Conference football standings
	Conf.					Overall
Team	W		L		T	W		L		T
No. 3 Western Kentucky $^	7	–	0	–	0	12	–	1	–	0
Murray State	5	–	2	–	0	7	–	3	–	0
Eastern Kentucky	4	–	3	–	0	7	–	4	–	0
Morehead State	4	–	3	–	0	6	–	5	–	0
East Tennessee State	3	–	4	–	0	4	–	7	–	0
Middle Tennessee	3	–	4	–	0	4	–	7	–	0
Tennessee Tech	1	–	6	–	0	2	–	8	–	1
Austin Peay	1	–	6	–	0	2	–	8	–	0
$ – Conference champion; ^ – NCAA Division II playoff participant; Rankings from AP small college poll

1973 Pennsylvania State Athletic Conference football standings
	Conf.					Overall
Team	W		L		T	W		L		T
East Division
West Chester xy	4	–	0	–	0	5	–	5	–	0
East Stroudsburg	5	–	1	–	0	6	–	1	–	1
Millersville	4	–	2	–	0	7	–	2	–	0
Cheyney	3	–	2	–	0	5	–	4	–	0
Bloomsburg	2	–	4	–	0	4	–	5	–	0
Kutztown	1	–	5	–	0	2	–	7	–	0
Mansfield	0	–	5	–	0	1	–	7	–	0
West Division
No. T–20 Slippery Rock xy$	5	–	0	–	0	8	–	2	–	0
Clarion	3	–	2	–	0	5	–	4	–	0
Edinboro	3	–	2	–	0	4	–	4	–	1
Lock Haven	2	–	3	–	0	2	–	7	–	0
California (PA)	1	–	4	–	0	3	–	6	–	0
Shippensburg	1	–	4	–	0	2	–	7	–	0
Indiana (PA) *	0	–	0	–	0	4	–	5	–	0
Championship: Slippery Rock 28, West Chester 14
$ – Conference champion; x – Division champion/co-champions; y – Championship game participant; * – Ineligible for conference title; Rankings from NAIA Division I poll

1973 Southern Intercollegiate Athletic Conference football standings
	Conf.					Overall
Team	W		L		T	W		L		T
Division I
Bethune–Cookman x	5	–	0	–	0	9	–	2	–	0
Florida A&M	4	–	1	–	0	5	–	6	–	0
No. 16 Albany State	3	–	2	–	0	6	–	3	–	1
Alabama A&M	3	–	2	–	0	5	–	5	–	0
Tuskegee	2	–	3	–	0	7	–	4	–	0
Morris Brown	1	–	4	–	0	1	–	8	–	1
Alabama State	0	–	5	–	0	3	–	8	–	0
Division II
No. 7 Fisk x	5	–	0	–	0	9	–	0	–	0
Fort Valley State	4	–	1	–	0	7	–	1	–	1
Clark (GA)	4	–	1	–	0	4	–	3	–	1
Morehouse	3	–	2	–	0	4	–	3	–	1
Savannah State	2	–	3	–	0	3	–	6	–	0
Lane	1	–	4	–	0	3	–	6	–	0
Miles	1	–	4	–	0	1	–	8	–	0
Knoxville	0	–	5	–	0	0	–	8	–	0
x – Division champion/co-champions; Rankings from NAIA Division II poll

1973 Southland Conference football standings
	Conf.					Overall
Team	W		L		T	W		L		T
No. 2 Louisiana Tech $^	5	–	0	–	0	12	–	1	–	0
Arkansas State	3	–	2	–	0	7	–	3	–	0
Lamar	3	–	2	–	0	5	–	5	–	0
McNeese State	2	–	3	–	0	7	–	3	–	1
UT Arlington	2	–	3	–	0	4	–	6	–	0
SW Louisiana	0	–	5	–	0	0	–	10	–	0
$ – Conference champion; ^ – NCAA Division II playoff participant; Rankings from AP small college poll

1973 Southwestern Athletic Conference football standings
	Conf.					Overall
Team	W		L		T	W		L		T
No. 5/7 Grambling +^	5	–	1	–	0	10	–	3	–	0
No. 10 Jackson State +	5	–	1	–	0	9	–	2	–	0
No. T–20 Alcorn A&M	3	–	2	–	1	7	–	2	–	1
Southern	3	–	3	–	0	6	–	4	–	0
Texas Southern	2	–	3	–	1	5	–	5	–	1
Mississippi Valley State	2	–	4	–	0	3	–	5	–	0
Prairie View A&M	0	–	6	–	0	2	–	6	–	1
+ – Conference co-champions; ^ – NCAA Division II playoff participant; Rankings from NAIA Division I poll and AP small college poll

1973 West Virginia Intercollegiate Athletic Conference football standings
	Conf.					Overall
Team	W		L		T	W		L		T
Northern Division
Fairmont State xy$	3	–	0	–	0	6	–	3	–	1
West Liberty State	2	–	1	–	1	3	–	5	–	1
Salem	2	–	2	–	0	6	–	4	–	0
Shepherd	1	–	2	–	0	6	–	4	–	0
West Virginia Wesleyan	0	–	3	–	1	2	–	6	–	1
Southern Division
No. 2 Glenville State xy^	4	–	0	–	0	10	–	2	–	0
Bluefield State	3	–	1	–	0	4	–	5	–	0
West Virginia State	2	–	2	–	0	5	–	5	–	0
West Virginia Tech	1	–	3	–	0	4	–	5	–	0
Concord	0	–	4	–	0	0	–	9	–	0
Championship: Fairmont State 21, Glenville State 7
$ – Conference champion; x – Division champion/co-champions; y – Championship game participant; ^ – NAIA Division II playoff participant Conference standings based on power ratings; Rankings from NAIA Division II poll

1973 Yankee Conference football standings
	Conf.					Overall
Team	W		L		T	W		L		T
Connecticut $	5	–	0	–	1	8	–	2	–	1
Rhode Island	4	–	1	–	1	6	–	2	–	2
UMass	4	–	2	–	0	6	–	5	–	0
New Hampshire	2	–	3	–	0	4	–	5	–	0
Boston University	2	–	3	–	0	3	–	7	–	0
Maine	2	–	4	–	0	3	–	7	–	0
Vermont	1	–	5	–	0	3	–	6	–	0
$ – Conference champion

1973 NCAA Division II independents football records
	Conf.			Overall
Team	W	L	T	W		L		T
No. 1 Tennessee State		–		10	–	0	–	0
No. 9 Hawaii		–		9	–	2	–	0
Nebraska–Omaha		–		7	–	2	–	1
Trinity (TX)		–		8	–	3	–	0
UNLV		–		8	–	3	–	0
No. 13 Delaware ^		–		8	–	4	–	0
Western Carolina		–		6	–	3	–	1
Central Michigan		–		7	–	4	–	0
Nevada		–		7	–	4	–	0
Western Illinois		–		7	–	4	–	0
Milwaukee		–		6	–	4	–	1
Eastern Michigan		–		6	–	4	–	0
American International		–		5	–	4	–	0
Akron		–		6	–	5	–	0
Central State (OH)		–		6	–	5	–	0
Ball State		–		5	–	5	–	1
Wayne State (MI)		–		5	–	5	–	0
Drexel		–		4	–	4	–	0
Bucknell		–		3	–	4	–	2
Northeast Louisiana		–		3	–	5	–	2
Santa Clara		–		4	–	6	–	0
Youngstown State		–		4	–	6	–	0
Arkansas–Pine Bluff		–		3	–	5	–	1
Chattanooga		–		4	–	7	–	0
Indiana State		–		4	–	7	–	0
Northeastern		–		3	–	6	–	0
Kentucky State		–		3	–	8	–	0
Northern Michigan		–		2	–	7	–	1
Eastern Illinois		–		2	–	9	–	0
Portland State		–		1	–	10	–	0
^ – NCAA Division II playoff participant; Rankings from AP small college poll

== Conference summaries ==
Conference	Champion
Big Sky Conference	Boise State
California Collegiate Athletic Association	Cal Poly
Central Intercollegiate Athletic Association	Virginia Union
Eastern Football Conference	Central Connecticut State
Far Western Football Conference	UC Davis and Cal State Chico
Gulf South Conference	Troy State
Indiana Collegiate Conference	Butler
Mid-Eastern Athletic Conference	North Carolina Central
Missouri Intercollegiate Athletic Association	Southeast Missouri State
North Central Conference	North Dakota State and South Dakota
Ohio Valley Conference	Western Kentucky
Southern Intercollegiate Athletic Conference	Bethune-Cookman
Southland Conference	Louisiana Tech
Southwestern Athletic Conference	Grambling and Jackson State
Yankee Conference	Connecticut

== Postseason ==
1973 NCAA Division II Football Championship
- Teams: 8
- Finals Site: Hughes Stadium; Sacramento, California
- Champion: Louisiana Tech; (1st title, 1st title game)
- Runner-up: Western Kentucky; (1st title game)
- Semifinalists: Grambling; Boise State
- Winning coach: Maxie Lambright; 1st championship

The 1973 NCAA Division II Football Championship playoffs were the first single-elimination tournament to determine the national champion of men's NCAA Division II college football. The inaugural edition had only eight teams; of the four quarterfinal games, three were played on campus and a fourth was in Atlantic City, New Jersey, the final edition of the Boardwalk Bowl. The semifinals were held at the Grantland Rice Bowl in Baton Rouge, Louisiana, and the Pioneer Bowl in Wichita Falls, Texas.

The championship game was the Camellia Bowl, held at Hughes Stadium in Sacramento, California. The Louisiana Tech Bulldogs defeated the Western Kentucky Hilltoppers 34–0 to win their first national title.

=== Playoff bracket ===
First round Atlantic City, NJ & 3 campus sites December 1
Grambling	17
Delaware	8
Western Kentucky *	25
Lehigh	16
Louisiana Tech *	18
Western Illinois	13
Boise State *	53
South Dakota	10

Semifinals; Grantland Rice Bowl; Pioneer Bowl December 8
Grambling	20
Western Kentucky	28
Louisiana Tech	38
Boise State	34

Championship; Camellia Bowl; Hughes Stadium; Sacramento, CA; December 15
Western Kentucky	0
Louisiana Tech	34

* Denotes host institution

== Rankings ==
United Press International (UPI) and the Associated Press (AP) continued to rank teams in their College Division or "small college" polls, which had started in 1958 and 1960, respectively. In 1973, UPI published their final poll at the end of the regular season, while the AP waited until postseason games had been completed. Both wire services named the Tennessee State Tigers as the number one team; Tennessee State did not compete in the playoffs "because five of its starters would not be eligible to play." The players in question had sat out their freshmen year ("redshirt") and then played four seasons; under NCAA rules at the time, such players were not eligible for postseason play as fifth-year seniors. During the regular season, the Tigers were undefeated (10–0) and had outscored their opponents 333–87.

United Press International (coaches) final poll
Published on November 28

Rank	School	Record	No. 1 votes	Total points
1	Tennessee State	10–0	27	314
2	Western Kentucky	10–0	3	275
3	Louisiana Tech	9–1	1	224
4	Abilene Christian	9–1		176
5	Wittenberg	9–0		169
6	Elon	11–0		151
7	Grambling State	9–2		96
8	Boise State	9–2		91
9	Cal Poly	9–1		90
10	Delaware	8–3		41
11	Jacksonville State	7–2		32
12	Langston	10–0		24
13	Hawaii	8–2		23
14	C.W. Post	10–1		15
15	South Dakota	8–2		11

Associated Press (writers) final poll
Published on December 19

Rank	School	Record	No. 1 votes	Total points
1	Tennessee State	10–0	17	708
2	Louisiana Tech	12–1^{D2}	21	706
3	Western Kentucky	12–1^{D2}		459
4	Wittenberg	12–0^{D3}	1	407
T5	Boise State	10–3^{D2}		390
T5	Abilene Christian	11–1^{N1}		390
7	Grambling State	10–3^{D2}		372
8	Cal Poly	9–1		264
9	Hawaii	8–2		233
10	Elon	12–1^{N1}		223
11	South Dakota	8–3^{D2}		221
12	Jacksonville State	7–2		220
13	Delaware	8–3		152
14	North Dakota State	8–2		111
15	Langston	11–1^{N1}		95

^N1 Record includes NAIA Division I playoff games
^D2 Record includes NCAA Division II playoff games
^D3 Record includes NCAA Division III playoff games

== See also ==
- 1973 NCAA Division I football season
- 1973 NCAA Division III football season
- 1973 NAIA Division I football season
- 1973 NAIA Division II football season
