= 1973 small college football rankings =

- Selectors: AP, UPI
- No. 1: Tennessee State
- Small college football rankings (AP, UPI)
- «1972 1974»

The 1973 small college football rankings are rankings of college football teams representing smaller college and university teams during the 1973 NCAA Division II, Division III, and NAIA football seasons. Separate rankings were published by the Associated Press (AP) and the United Press International (UPI). The AP rankings were selected by a board of sports writers, and the UPI rankings were selected by a board of small-college coaches.

Instead of using the polls to crown a national champion, 1973 was the first year for the Division II and III playoffs. The final UPI poll was released before the playoffs, and the final AP poll was released after the playoffs.

The 1973 Tennessee State Tigers football team (10–0) was rated No. 1 by both the AP and UPI. Louisiana Tech (12–1) was ranked No. 2 by the AP and No. 3 by the UPI and then defeated Western Kentucky in the NCAA Division II championship game. Wittenberg (12–0) was ranked No. 4 by the AP and No. 5 by the UPI and went on to defeat Juniata in the NCAA Division III championship game/Amos Alonzo Stagg Bowl.

== Legend ==
	Increase in ranking
	Decrease in ranking
	Not ranked previous week
(#–#)	Win–loss record
(Italics)	Number of first place votes
т	Tied with team above or below also with this symbol

== AP poll ==
	Week 1 Sept 19	Week 2 Sept 26	Week 3 Oct 3	Week 4 Oct 10	Week 5 Oct 17	Week 6 Oct 24	Week 7 Oct 31	Week 8 Nov 7	Week 9 Nov 14	Week 10 Nov 21	Week 11 Nov 28	Week Postseason	
1.	Delaware (2–0) (23)	Delaware (3–0) (30)	Delaware (4–0) (27)	Delaware (5–0) (39)	Delaware (6–0) (32)	Tennessee State (6–0) (27)	Tennessee State (7–0) (28)	Tennessee State (8–0) (28)	Tennessee State (9–0) (26)	Tennessee State (10–0) (31)	Tennessee State (10–0) (25)	Tennessee State (10–0) (17)	1.
2.	Grambling (2–0) (3)	Grambling (3–0) (5)	Grambling (4–0) (7)	Tennessee State (4–0) (1)	Tennessee State (5–0) (4)	Delaware (6–1) (5)	Hawaii (6–0) (6)	Hawaii (7–0) (5)	Hawaii (8–0) (4)	Western Kentucky (10–0) (3)	Western Kentucky (10–0) (4)	Louisiana Tech (12–1) (21)	2.
3.	Tennessee State (2–0) (1)	South Dakota (3–0) (1)	South Dakota (4–0) (7)	Cal Poly (3–0)	Cal Poly (4–0)	Hawaii (5–0) (2)	Western Kentucky (7–0) (2)	Western Kentucky (8–0) (3)	Western Kentucky (9–0) (3)	Louisiana Tech (10–1) (1)	Louisiana Tech (10–1)	Western Kentucky (12–1)	3.
4.	South Dakota State (2–0) (2)	Tennessee State (3–0)	Eastern Michigan (4–0)	Hawaii (4–0)	Hawaii (4–0)	Cal Poly (5–0) (6)	Cal Poly (6–0) (5)	Cal Poly (7–0) (3)	Cal Poly (8–0) (4)	Wittenberg (10–0) (2)	Wittenberg (10–0) (2)	Wittenberg (12–0) (1)	4.
5.	North Dakota State (3–0) (4)	Eastern Michigan (3–0) (1)	Cal Poly (3–0)	Boise State (4–0)	Grambling (5–1)	Western Kentucky (6–0) (2)	South Dakota (7–1)	Louisiana Tech (8–1) (1)	Louisiana Tech (9–1)	Grambling (9–2)	Grambling (9–2)	Boise State (10–3) т	5.
6.	Eastern Michigan (2–0) (2)	Hawaii (2–0) (1)	Hawaii (3–0) (1)	Grambling (4–1)	Western Kentucky (5–0)	South Dakota (6–1)	Louisiana Tech (7–1)	Wittenberg (8–0) (2)	Wittenberg (9–0) (2)	Hawaii (8–1) т	Elon (11–0) (1)	Abilene Christian (11–1) т	6.
7.	Cal Poly (1–0) (Note: In the actual printed polls, Cal Poly was listed as Cal Poly San Luis Obispo)	Ashland (3–0)	Tennessee State (3–0) (1)	Louisiana Tech (4–1)	South Dakota (5–1)	Wittenberg (6–0) (1)	Wittenberg (7–0) (2)	Elon (9–0) (1)	Grambling (8–2)	Elon (11–0) (2) т	Boise State (9–2)	Grambling (10–3)	7.
8.	North Dakota (2–0)	Cal Poly (2–0)	Boise State (3–0)	South Dakota (4–1)	Louisiana Tech (5–1)	Louisiana Tech (6–1)	North Dakota State (8–1) (1)	Grambling (7–2)	Elon (10–0) (1)	Boise State (8–2) (1)	Abilene Christian (9–1)	Cal Poly (9–1)	8.
9.	Ashland (2–0)	Louisiana Tech (2–1)	Louisiana Tech (3–1)	Eastern Michigan (4–1)	Wittenberg (5–0)	Grambling (6–1)	Boise State (6–1)	UNLV (6–2)	UNLV (7–2)	Cal Poly (8–1)	Cal Poly (9–1)	Hawaii (9–2)	9.
10.	Boise State (1–0)	Boise State (2–0)	Carson–Newman (3–0)	North Dakota State (5–1)	North Dakota State (6–1)	North Dakota State (7–1)	Delaware (6–2)	North Dakota State (8–2)	Boise State (7–2)	Abilene Christian (9–1) (1)	South Dakota (8–2)	Elon (12–1)	10.
11.	Hawaii (1–0) (2) т	Carson–Newman (3–0)	Jacksonville State (3–0)	Western Kentucky (4–0)	Boise State (4–1)	Boise State (5–1)	Elon (8–0) (1)	Boise State (6–2)	North Dakota State (8–3)	South Dakota (8–2)	Hawaii (8–2)	South Dakota (8–3)	11.
12.	Louisiana Tech (1–1) (1) т	McNeese State (2–0) (1)	North Dakota State (4–1)	Carson–Newman (4–0)	Eastern Michigan (4–1)	UNLV (6–1)	UNLV (6–2)	Carson–Newman (7–1)	South Dakota (8–2)	Delaware (8–3)	Delaware (8–3)	Jacksonville State (7–2)	12.
13.	McNeese State (1–0)	Northwestern State (3–0) (Note: In the actual printed polls, Northwestern State was listed as Northwestern Louisiana)	Western Kentucky (3–0)	Wittenberg (4–0)	UNLV (5–1) (Note: In the actual printed polls, UNLV was listed as Nevada Las Vegas)	Elon (7–0) (1)	Grambling (6–2)	South Dakota (7–2)	Abilene Christian (8–1)	North Dakota State (8–2)	North Dakota State (8–2)	Delaware (8–3)	13.
14.	Carson–Newman (2–0)	North Dakota (1–2) т	Manual (1–0–2)	North Dakota (3–2)	Elon (6–0)	Western Illinois (4–2) (1)	Carson–Newman (6–1)	Delaware (6–3)	Delaware (7–3)	Langston (10–0)	Langston (11–0) (1)	North Dakota State (8–2)	14.
15.	Jackson State (2–0) (1)	North Dakota State (3–1) т	North Dakota (2–2)	Jacksonville State (3–1)	Carson–Newman (4–1)	Carson–Newman (5–1)	Eastern Michigan (5–2)	Montana State (7–2)	McNeese State (6–3)	Jacksonville State (7–2)	Jacksonville State (7–2)	Langston (11–1)	15.
	Week 1 Sept 19	Week 2 Sept 26	Week 3 Oct 3	Week 4 Oct 10	Week 5 Oct 17	Week 6 Oct 24	Week 7 Oct 31	Week 8 Nov 7	Week 9 Nov 14	Week 10 Nov 21	Week 11 Nov 28	Week Postseason	
		Dropped: 4 South Dakota State; 15 Jackson State	Dropped: 7 Ashland; 12 McNeese State; 13 Northwestern State	Dropped: 14 Northeast Louisiana	Dropped: 14 North Dakota; 15 Jacksonville State	Dropped: 12 Eastern Michigan	Dropped: 14 Western Illinois	Dropped: 15 Eastern Michigan	Dropped: 12 Carson–Newman; 15 Montana State	Dropped: 9 UNLV; 15 McNeese State	None	None	

== UPI coaches poll ==
	Week Sept 19	Week 1 Sept 26	Week 2 Oct 3	Week 3 Oct 10	Week 4 Oct 17	Week 5 Oct 24	Week 6 Oct 31	Week 7 Nov 7	Week 8 Nov 14	Week 9 Nov 21	Week 10 Nov 28	
1.	Delaware (2–0) (24)	Delaware (3–0) (26)	Delaware (4–0) (19)	Delaware (5–0) (24)	Delaware (6–0) (27)	Tennessee State (6–0) (20)	Tennessee State (7–0) (21)	Tennessee State (8–0) (23)	Tennessee State (9–0) (20)	Tennessee State (10–0) (25)	Tennessee State (10–0) (27)	1.
2.	Grambling (2–0)	Grambling (3–0) (2)	Grambling (4–0) (4)	Tennessee State (4–0) (1)	Tennessee State (5–0) (3)	Hawaii (5–0) (6)	Hawaii (6–0) (5)	Hawaii (7–0) (6)	Hawaii (8–0) (6)	Western Kentucky (10–0) (4)	Western Kentucky (10–0) (3)	2.
3.	South Dakota (2–0) (2)	South Dakota (3–0) (1)	South Dakota (4–0) (3)	Hawaii (4–0) (1)	Hawaii (4–0) (1)	Cal Poly (5–0) (2)	Cal Poly (6–0) (3)	Western Kentucky (7–0) (2)	Western Kentucky (9–0) (4)	Louisiana Tech (8–1) (1)	Louisiana Tech (9–1) (1)	3.
4.	Hawaii (1–0) (1)	Hawaii (2–0) (2)	Eastern Michigan (4–0) (3)	Boise State (4–0) (5)	Cal Poly (4–0)	Western Kentucky (5–0) (2)	Western Kentucky (6–0) (2)	Cal Poly (7–0) (1)	Cal Poly (8–0) (3)	Wittenberg (9–0)	Abilene Christian (9–1)	4.
5.	Tennessee State (2–0)	Eastern Michigan (3–0)	Hawaii (3–0) (3)	Cal Poly (3–0)	Western Kentucky (4–0) (2)	Delaware (6–1) (1)	Louisiana Tech (6–1)	Louisiana Tech (7–1)	Louisiana Tech (7–1) (1)	Abilene Christian (9–1)	Wittenberg (9–0)	5.
6.	North Dakota State (3–0)	Tennessee State (3–0)	Cal Poly (3–0)	Western Kentucky (3–0) (1)	Grambling (5–1)	Louisiana Tech (5–1)	Boise State (6–1) (1)	Wittenberg (8–0)	Wittenberg (9–0)	Elon (11–0)	Elon (11–0)	6.
7.	Eastern Michigan (2–0)	Cal Poly (2–0) (1)	Tennessee State (3–0)	Grambling (4–1)	Louisiana Tech (4–1)	Grambling (6–1)	South Dakota (7–1)	Elon (9–0) (1)	Elon (10–0) (1)	Hawaii (8–1)	Grambling (9–2)	7.
8.	Cal Poly (1–0) (1)	Ashland (3–0)	Boise State (3–0)	Louisiana Tech (3–1)	Boise State (4–1)	Boise State (5–1) (1)	North Dakota State (6–1)	Abilene Christian (7–1)	Abilene Christian (8–1)	Boise State (8–2)	Boise State (9–2)	8.
9.	Ashland (2–0)	Northwestern State (3–0) (1)	Western Kentucky (3–0) (1)	North Dakota State (4–1)	South Dakota (5–1)	South Dakota (6–1)	Wittenberg (7–0)	Montana State (7–2) (1)	Grambling (8–2)	Grambling (9–2)	Cal Poly (9–1)	9.
10.	Northwestern State (2–0)	Boise State (2–0)	Louisiana Tech (2–1)	Carson–Newman (4–0)	UNLV (4–1)	North Dakota State (6–1)	Elon (8–0) (1)	Grambling (7–2)	UNLV (8–2)	Cal Poly (8–1)	Delaware (8–3)	10.
11.	North Dakota (1–1)	Louisiana Tech (1–1)	North Dakota State (3–1)	Wittenberg (4–0) т	Elon (6–0)	UNLV (5–1)	Abilene Christian (6–1)	Boise State (6–2)	Boise State (7–2)	Jacksonville State (7–2)	Jacksonville State (7–2)	11.
12.	Carson–Newman (2–0)	Carson–Newman (3–0)	Wittenberg (3–0)	Troy State (4–0–1) т	Wittenberg (5–0)	Elon (7–0) (1)	Montana State (6–2) (1)	Howard Payne (8–1)	Jacksonville State (6–2)	C.W. Post (9–1)	Langston (10–0)	12.
13.	Western Kentucky (1–0)	North Dakota State (3–1)	Carson–Newman (3–0)	South Dakota (4–1)	North Dakota State (5–1)	Troy State (6–0–1)	Delaware (6–2)	UNLV (6–2)	Howard Payne (9–1)	Delaware	Hawaii (8–2)	13.
14.	McNeese State (1–0) (1)	Western Kentucky (2–0)	Northern Colorado (3–0)	Elon (5–0) (1)	Troy State (5–0–1)	Wittenberg (6–0)	Grambling (6–2)	Connecticut (6–2)	Connecticut (7–2)	Langston (10–0)	C.W. Post (10–1)	14.
15.	Bridgeport (1–0) (1)	Jacksonville State (3–0)	Jacksonville State (3–0)	East Texas State (4–1)	Eastern Michigan (4–1)	Abilene Christian (5–1)	Emporia State (7–0)	Jacksonville State (5–2)	C.W. Post (8–1)	Nebraska–Omaha (7–2–1)	South Dakota (8–2)	15.
16.	Idaho State (1–1)			Montana State (3–2)								16.
17.	Jacksonville State (2–0)			UNLV (4–1)								17.
18.	Arkansas State (2–0)			Emporia State (4–0)								18.
19.	Louisiana Tech (0–1)			Eastern Michigan (4–1)								19.
20.	UMass (1–1) (Note: In the actual printed polls, UMass was listed as Massachusetts)			St. Thomas (MN) (5–0)								20.
	Week Sept 19	Week 1 Sept 26	Week 2 Oct 3	Week 3 Oct 10	Week 4 Oct 17	Week 5 Oct 24	Week 6 Oct 31	Week 7 Nov 7	Week 8 Nov 14	Week 9 Nov 21	Week 10 Nov 28	
		Dropped: 11 North Dakota; 14 McNeese State; 15 Bridgeport; 16 Idaho State; 18 Arkansas State; 20 UMass	Dropped: 8 Ashland; 9 Northwestern State	Dropped: 14 Northern Colorado; 15 Jacksonville State	Dropped: 10 Carson–Newman; 15 East Texas State; 16 Montana State; 18 Emporia State; 20 St. Thomas (MN)	Dropped: 15 Eastern Michigan	Dropped: 11 UNLV; 13 Troy State	Dropped: 7 South Dakota; 8 North Dakota State; 13 Delaware; 15 Emporia State	Dropped: 9 Montana State	Dropped: 10 UNLV; 13 Howard Payne; 14 Connecticut	Dropped: 15 Nebraska–Omaha	

== HBCU rankings ==
Jet magazine ranked the top 1973 teams from historically black colleges and universities based on a poll of coaches and conference commissioners.

The poll was published on December 6.

- 1. Tennessee State (10–0)
- 2. Langston (11–1, NAIA)
- 3. Grambling (10–3)
- 4. Fisk (9–0)
- 5. Virginia Union (9–1)
- 6. Jackson State (9–2)
- 7. Alcorn A&M (7–2–1)
- 8. Bethune-Cookman (8–2)
- 9. Howard (8–2)
- 10. Livingstone (7–2–1)
- 11. South Carolina State (7–3–1)
- 12. Fort Valley State (7–2–1)
- 13. North Carolina College (7–4)
- 14. Albany State (6–2–1)
- 15. Johnson C. Smith (7–4)
- 16. Morgan State (6–3)
- 17. Central State (6–3)
- 18. Tuskegee (7–4)
- 19. Southern (6–4)
- 20. Alabama A&M (5–5)
