= 1973 Cal State Los Angeles Diablos football team =

American college football season

1973 Cal State Los Angeles Diablos football
- Conference: Pacific Coast Athletic Association
- Record: 4–6–1 (0–0 PCAA)
- Head coach: Foster Andersen (3rd season)
- Home stadium: Campus Stadium

1973 Pacific Coast Athletic Association football standings
	Conf.					Overall
Team	W		L		T	W		L		T
San Diego State $	3	–	0	–	1	9	–	1	–	1
San Jose State	2	–	0	–	2	5	–	4	–	2
Pacific (CA)	2	–	1	–	1	7	–	2	–	1
Fresno State	1	–	3	–	0	2	–	9	–	0
Long Beach State	0	–	4	–	0	1	–	9	–	1
$ – Conference champion

The 1973 Cal State Los Angeles Diablos football team represented California State University, Los Angeles as a member of the Pacific Coast Athletic Association (PCAA) during the 1973 NCAA Division I football season. The one game played against PCAA teams did not count in the conference standings. Led by Foster Andersen in his third and final season as head coach, Cal State Los Angeles compiled an overall record of 4–6–1. The team was outscored 320 to 281 for the season. The Diablos played home games at the Campus Stadium in Los Angeles.

== Schedule ==
Date	Time	Opponent	Site	Result	Attendance	Source
September 15		at UNLV*	Las Vegas Stadium; Whitney, NV	L 7–42	7,023	
September 22		Cal State Fullerton*	Campus Field; Los Angeles, CA	L 14–35	2,500	
September 29		at Cal Poly Pomona*	Kellogg Field; Pomona, CA	T 34–34	2,000–2,500	
October 6		at Hawaii*	Honolulu Stadium; Honolulu, HI	L 9–16	23,015	
October 13		at Azusa Pacific*	Azusa, CA	W 35–16	1,452	
October 20		Cal Lutheran*	Campus Field; Los Angeles, CA	W 32–27	1,000–1,500	
October 27		United States International*	Campus Field; Los Angeles, CA	W 44–6	1,000	
November 3	1:30 p.m.	at Pacific (CA)*	Pacific Memorial Stadium; Stockton, CA	L 2–54	5,884	
November 9		UC Riverside*	Campus Field; Los Angeles, CA	L 14–38	1,200	
November 16		Cal State Northridge*	Campus Field; Los Angeles, CA	W 63–22	500–1,200	
November 24		at San Diego*	Torero Stadium; San Diego, CA	L 27–30	2,000–2,354	
*Non-conference game; All times are in Pacific time
