= 1973 Fiesta Bowl =

American college football game

- 3rd Fiesta Bowl
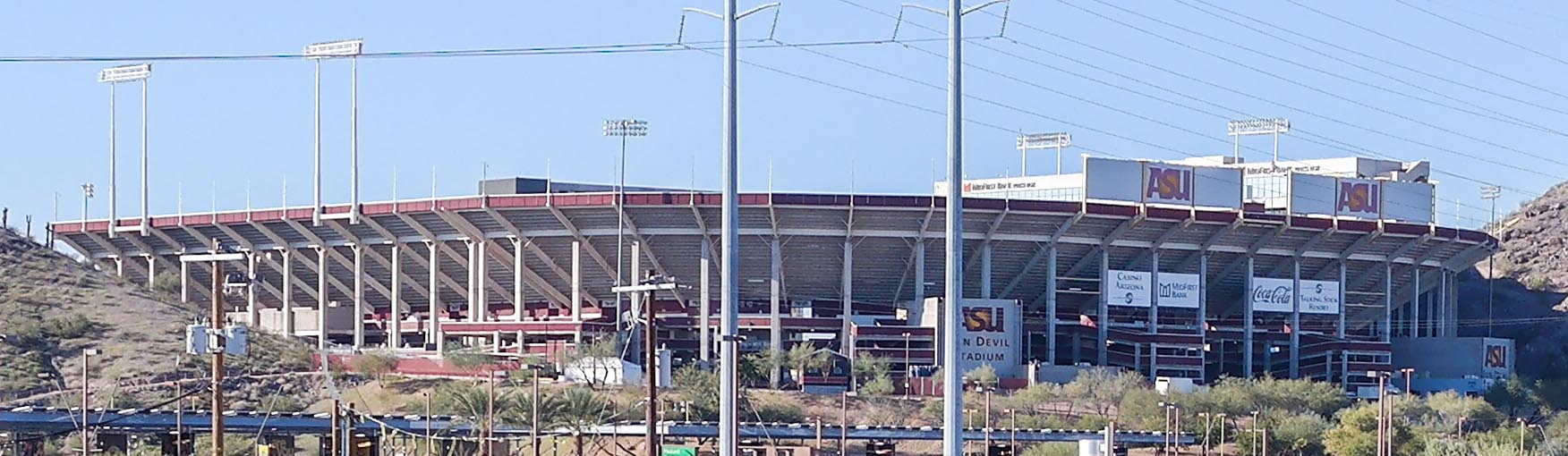
- Sun Devil Stadium in Tempe, Arizona, hosted the Fiesta Bowl.
Pittsburgh Panthers	Arizona State Sun Devils
(6–4–1)	(10–1)
Independent	WAC
7	28
Head coach: Johnny Majors	Head coach: Frank Kush
AP / Coaches; NR / NR	AP / Coaches; 10 / 10
	1	2	3	4	Total
Pittsburgh	7	0	0	0	7
Arizona State	7	0	3	18	28
- Date: December 21, 1973
- Season: 1973
- Stadium: Sun Devil Stadium
- Location: Tempe, Arizona
- MVP: Greg Hudson (ASU SE); Mike Haynes (ASU CB)
- Favorite: Arizona State by 14 points
- Attendance: 50,878
- Payout: US$185,000 each

United States TV coverage
- Network: Mizlou
- Announcers: Ray Scott, John Sauer

The 1973 Fiesta Bowl was the third edition of the college football bowl game, played at Sun Devil Stadium in Tempe, Arizona on Friday, December 21. Part of the 1973–74 bowl game season, it matched the unranked independent Pittsburgh Panthers and #10 Arizona State Sun Devils of the Western Athletic Conference (WAC).

After falling behind early, favored Arizona State pulled away in the fourth quarter and won again on its home field, 28–7.

== Teams ==
=== Pittsburgh ===
In their first year under head coach Johnny Majors, the Panthers were ranked twice in the AP poll in November (at #20), but lost the next game (Notre Dame, Penn State). This was Pittsburgh's first bowl appearance in seventeen years.

=== Arizona State ===
The Sun Devils were co-champions of the WAC, the sole loss was an upset at Utah; ASU defeated rival Arizona in the late November to clinch the share. This was their fifth straight WAC title and third consecutive Fiesta Bowl appearance; they had won the first two editions (1971, 1972).

== Game summary ==
Televised by Mizlou, the kickoff on Friday night was shortly after 6 p.m. MST. It was the Fiesta Bowl's second night game, and the last until January 1987.

All-American freshman halfback Tony Dorsett gave Pittsburgh an early lead on his three-yard touchdown run. Arizona State responded, as its All-American halfback Woody Green ran it in from three yards to make it 7–7 at the end of the first quarter; the second quarter was scoreless.

A field goal by Danny Kush gave Arizona State a 10–7 lead after three quarters. Split end Greg Hudson increased the lead with a 38-yard touchdown reception from quarterback Danny White, and Green (who had 25 rushes for 131 yards) added two more touchdown runs. The game had thirteen punts and fourteen turnovers, with eight each by Pittsburgh.

Hudson had eight receptions for 186 yards and was the offensive player of the game; cornerback Mike Haynes had two interceptions and took the defensive honor.

=== Scoring ===
First quarter

- Pittsburgh – Tony Dorsett 3-yard run (Carson Long kick)
- Arizona State – Woody Green 3-yard run (Danny Kush kick)

Second quarter
No scoring
Third quarter

- Arizona State – Kush 30-yard field goal

Fourth quarter

- Arizona State – Greg Hudson 38-yard pass from Danny White (kick failed)
- Arizona State – Green 23-yard run (kick failed)
- Arizona State – Green 1-yard run (kick failed)

== Statistics ==
Statistics	Pittsburgh	Arizona State
First downs	12	18
Yards rushing	47–151	45–164
Yards passing	57	269
Passing	7–23–4	14–20–3
Return yards	27	−4
Total Offense	70–208	65–433
Punts–Average	8–39.3	5–46.0
Fumbles–Lost	5–4	4–3
Turnovers	8	6
Penalties–Yards	4–34	7–73

== Aftermath ==
While in the WAC, Arizona State returned to the Fiesta Bowl twice more, in 1975 and 1977, their sole defeat. Pittsburgh came back in 1979 with another heralded freshman, quarterback Dan Marino, and won.
