= 1973 BYU Cougars football team =

American college football season

1973 BYU Cougars football
- Conference: Western Athletic Conference
- Record: 5–6 (3–4 WAC)
- Head coach: LaVell Edwards (2nd season)
- Offensive coordinator: Dave Kragthorpe (4th season)
- Offensive scheme: West Coast
- Defensive coordinator: Dick Felt (2nd season)
- Base defense: 4–3
- Home stadium: Cougar Stadium

1973 Western Athletic Conference football standings
	Conf.					Overall
Team	W		L		T	W		L		T
No. 9 Arizona State +	6	–	1	–	0	11	–	1	–	0
Arizona +	6	–	1	–	0	8	–	3	–	0
Utah	4	–	2	–	0	7	–	5	–	0
BYU	3	–	4	–	0	5	–	6	–	0
New Mexico	3	–	4	–	0	4	–	7	–	0
Wyoming	3	–	4	–	0	4	–	7	–	0
Colorado State	2	–	4	–	0	5	–	6	–	0
UTEP	0	–	7	–	0	0	–	11	–	0
+ – Conference co-champions; Rankings from AP Poll

The 1973 BYU Cougars football team represented Brigham Young University during the 1973 NCAA Division I football season. The Cougars were led by second-year head coach LaVell Edwards and played their home games at Cougar Stadium in Provo, Utah. The team competed as a member of the Western Athletic Conference, finishing tied for fourth with a conference record of 3–4.

== Schedule ==
Date	Opponent	Site	Result	Attendance	Source
September 15	Colorado State	Cougar Stadium; Provo, UT	L 13–21	28,255	
September 29	Oregon State*	Cougar Stadium; Provo, UT	W 37–14	27,434	
October 6	at Utah State*	Romney Stadium; Logan, UT (Beehive Boot)	L 7–13	15,046	
October 13	Iowa State*^{†}	Cougar Stadium; Provo, UT	L 24–26	25,580	
October 20	at No. 12 Arizona State	Sun Devil Stadium; Tempe, AZ	L 12–52	47,137	
October 27	at Wyoming	War Memorial Stadium; Laramie, WY	L 21–41	18,746	
November 3	New Mexico	Cougar Stadium; Provo, UT	W 56–21	11,412	
November 10	Arizona	Cougar Stadium; Provo, UT	L 10–24	19,597	
November 17	Weber State*	Cougar Stadium; Provo, UT	W 45–14	14,548	
November 24	at Utah	Robert Rice Stadium; Salt Lake City, UT (rivalry)	W 46–22	18,243	
December 1	at UTEP	Sun Bowl; El Paso, TX	W 63–0	6,100	
*Non-conference game; ^{†}Homecoming; Rankings from AP Poll released prior to the game

== Game summaries ==
=== Colorado State ===
	1	2	3	4	Total
Rams	0	0	7	14	21
Cougars	0	0	7	6	13

Team	Category	Player	Statistics
Colorado State	Passing	Jan Stuebbe	15/34, 211 yards, INT
Colorado State	Rushing	Scot MacLachlan	23 rushes, 54 yards, 2 TD
Colorado State	Receiving	Willie Miller	4 receptions, 89 yards
BYU	Passing	Randy Litchfield	12/22, 135 yards, 3 INT
BYU	Rushing	Randy Litchfield	11 rushes, 32 yards, TD
BYU	Receiving	Jay Miller	6 receptions, 63 yards

=== Oregon State ===
	1	2	3	4	Total
Beavers	7	7	0	0	14
Cougars	14	7	7	9	37

Team	Category	Player	Statistics
Oregon State	Passing	Alvin White	15/41, 193 yards, INT
Oregon State	Rushing	Ray Taroli	13 rushes, 70 yards
Oregon State	Receiving	Dick Maurer	3 receptions, 50 yards
BYU	Passing	Randy Litchfield	12/23, 118 yards, TD
BYU	Rushing	Gil Gillenwater	30 rushes, 136 yards, 2 TD
BYU	Receiving	Sam LoBue	1 reception, 68 yards, TD

=== At Utah State ===
	1	2	3	4	Total
Cougars	0	7	0	0	7
Aggies	7	3	0	3	13

Team	Category	Player	Statistics
BYU	Passing	Randy Litchfield	8/17, 91 yards, 3 INT
BYU	Rushing	Mark Terranova	15 rushes, 76 yards, TD
BYU	Receiving	Jay Miller	8 receptions, 99 yards
Utah State	Passing	Tom Wilson	3/6, 22 yards
Utah State	Rushing	Archie Gibson	22 rushes, 143 yards, TD
Utah State	Receiving	Kelley Deist	1 reception, 12 yards

=== Iowa State ===
	1	2	3	4	Total
Cyclones	10	10	3	3	26
Cougars	7	0	7	10	24

Team	Category	Player	Statistics
Iowa State	Passing	Buddy Hardeman	9/18, 123 yards
Iowa State	Rushing	Buddy Hardeman	16 rushes, 88 yards
Iowa State	Receiving	Keith Krepfle	4 receptions, 95 yards
BYU	Passing	Gary Sheide	30/47, 445 yards, 3 TD, 4 INT
BYU	Rushing	Mark Terranova	20 rushes, 111 yards
BYU	Receiving	Jay Miller	13 receptions, 193 yards, TD

=== At No. 12 Arizona State ===
	1	2	3	4	Total
Cougars	0	0	6	6	12
No. 12 Sun Devils	16	13	16	7	52

Team	Category	Player	Statistics
BYU	Passing	Gary Sheide	22/39, 169 yards, TD, INT
BYU	Rushing	Mark Terranova	13 rushes, 74 yards
BYU	Receiving	Jay Miller	14 receptions, 95 yards, TD
Arizona State	Passing	Danny White	17/25, 303 yards, 3 TD
Arizona State	Rushing	Woody Green	17 rushes, 128 yards
Arizona State	Receiving	Morris Owens	6 receptions, 173 yards, TD

=== At Wyoming ===
	1	2	3	4	Total
Cougars	0	0	0	21	21
Cowboys	0	10	21	10	41

Team	Category	Player	Statistics
BYU	Passing	Gary Sheide	18/39, 317 yards, 2 TD, INT
BYU	Rushing	David Coon	17 rushes, 51 yards
BYU	Receiving	Jay Miller	7 receptions, 117 yards
Wyoming	Passing	Steve Cockreham	13/24, 208 yards, 3 TD
Wyoming	Rushing	Bruce Williams	17 rushes, 67 yards, TD
Wyoming	Receiving	Archie Gray	6 receptions, 112 yards, TD

=== New Mexico ===
	1	2	3	4	Total
Lobos	7	0	0	14	21
Cougars	12	21	0	23	56

Team	Category	Player	Statistics
New Mexico	Passing	Troy Williams	8/21, 142 yards, 2 TD, 2 INT
New Mexico	Rushing	Cliff Crenshaw	12 rushes, 34 yards
New Mexico	Receiving	Paul Labarrere	2 receptions, 80 yards, TD
BYU	Passing	Gary Sheide	32/50, 402 yards, 6 TD, INT
BYU	Rushing	Mark Terranova	14 rushes, 46 yards
BYU	Receiving	Jay Miller	22 receptions, 263 yards, 3 TD

=== Arizona ===
	1	2	3	4	Total
Wildcats	0	10	7	7	24
Cougars	0	10	0	0	10

Team	Category	Player	Statistics
Arizona	Passing	Bruce Hill	5/17, 72 yards, INT
Arizona	Rushing	Jim Upchurch	17 rushes, 146 yards, TD
Arizona	Receiving	Mark Neal	2 receptions, 50 yards
BYU	Passing	Gary Sheide	10/19, 82 yards, 2 INT
BYU	Rushing	Mark Terranova	12 rushes, 55 yards
BYU	Receiving	Jay Miller	7 receptions, 50 yards

=== Weber State ===
	1	2	3	4	Total
Wildcats	0	6	0	8	14
Cougars	14	10	14	7	45

Team	Category	Player	Statistics
Weber State	Passing	Rob Bockwoldt	4/14, 62 yards
Weber State	Rushing	Blaine Church	12 rushes, 51 yards
Weber State	Receiving	Gary Childress	6 receptions, 126 yards, TD
BYU	Passing	Gary Sheide	20/32, 244 yards, 4 TD, 2 INT
BYU	Rushing	Jeff Blanc	17 rushes, 90 yards
BYU	Receiving	Jay Miller	10 receptions, 155 yards, 3 TD

=== At Utah ===
Team	1	2	3	4	Total
• Cougars	3	27	16	0	46
Utes	0	3	6	13	22

- Date: November 24
- Location: Robert Rice Stadium, Salt Lake City
- Game attendance: 18,243
- Game weather: Snow

Scoring summary
1	BYU	Duke 51 yard field goal	BYU 3-0
2	BYU	Blanc 1 yard run (Duke kick)	BYU 10-0
2	BYU	Taylor 8 yard pass from Sheide (Duke kick)	BYU 17-0
2	BYU	Blanc 32 yard pass from Sheide (Duke kick)	BYU 24-0
2	BYU	Betham 35 yard pass from Sheide (kick failed)	BYU 30-0
2	UTAH	Marrelli 37 yard field goal	BYU 30-3
3	BYU	Safety	BYU 32-3
3	BYU	Blanc 1 yard run (Duke kick)	BYU 39-3
3	BYU	yard pass from Sheide (Duke kick)	BYU 46-3
4	UTAH	Odom 36 yard pass from Van Galder (kick failed)	BYU 46-9
4	UTAH	Hutchins 59 yard pass from Van Galder (Marrelli kick)	BYU 46-16
4	UTAH	Odom 33 yard pass from Van Galder (run failed)	BYU 46-22

Team	Category	Player	Statistics
BYU	Passing	Gary Sheide	22/34, 349 yards, 4 TD
BYU	Rushing	Steve Stratton	18 rushes, 121 yards
BYU	Receiving	John Betham	3 receptions, 126 yards, 2 TD
Utah	Passing	Don Van Galder	12/38, 224 yards, 3 TD, 2 INT
Utah	Rushing	Hutch Roosevelt	10 rushes, 69 yards
Utah	Receiving	Hutch Roosevelt	3 receptions, 77 yards, TD

The first half was played in a blinding snowstorm. Gary Sheide tied the WAC single-season touchdown record of 21 in the third quarter shared by Virgil Carter (1966) and Danny White (1972). It was the most points BYU had scored against Utah to date.

=== At UTEP ===
	1	2	3	4	Total
Cougars	6	30	7	20	63
Miners	0	0	0	0	0

Team	Category	Player	Statistics
BYU	Passing	Gary Sheide	17/28, 219 yards, TD, INT
BYU	Rushing	Jeff Blanc	17 rushes, 96 yards, TD
BYU	Receiving	Mike Pistorius	5 receptions, 68 yards
UTEP	Passing	Frank Duncan	3/10, 51 yards, 4 INT
UTEP	Rushing	Don Willis	15 rushes, 93 yards
UTEP	Receiving	Lonn Crittenden	2 receptions, 32 yards

== Personnel ==
=== Roster ===
1973 BYU Cougars football team roster
Players
Coaches
Offense

Pos.	#	Name	Class
QB	12	Gary Sheide	Jr
QB	13	Dave Terry	Jr
WR	17	Dave Affleck	Sr
C	55	Orrin Olsen	So
OT	70	Paul Muklewicz	Sr
OT	78	Brad Oates	So
OT	79	Dave Brooks	Sr

Defense

Pos.	#	Name	Class
CB	8	Dave Atkinson	Sr
S	9	Fred EchoHawk	Sr
CB	18	Stan Call	Jr
S	24	Tom EchoHawk	Sr
LB	45	Doug Adams	Jr
C	59	Sid Smith	So
LB	67	Larry Carr	Jr
DT	72	Wayne Baker	Jr
DT	77	Grant Wells	Sr
DE	90	Stan Varner	So

Special teams

Pos.	#	Name	Class
P	14	Doug Coon	Sr

Head coach

- Tommy Hudspeth

Coordinators/assistant coaches

Legend

- (C) Team captain
- (S) Suspended
- (I) Ineligible
- Injured
- Redshirt

Roster

=== Coaching staff ===
- Head coach: LaVell Edwards
- Assistants: Dave Kragthorpe (OC/OL), Dick Felt (DB), J.D. Helm (RB), Mel Olson (JV), Tom Ramage (DL), Dewey Warren (QB/WR), Fred Whittingham (LB)

== Awards ==
- All-WAC: DT Paul Linford (1st), SE Jay Miller (1st)
