= Darold Nogle =

Former American football player(1951-2019)

Profile
- Positions: Wide receiver, tight end

Personal information
- Born: December 10, 1951; Whittier, California, U.S.
- Died: August 3, 2019 (aged 67); Encinitas, California, U.S.
- Listed height: 5 ft 11 in (1.80 m)
- Listed weight: 187 lb (85 kg)

Career information
- High school: Monte Vista (Whittier, CA)
- College: Rio Hondo JC (1970–1971); San Diego State (1972–1973)

Career history
- San Diego Chargers (1974)*; Philadelphia Bell (1975); Portland Thunder (1975)
- * Offseason or practice squad member only

Darold Gene Nogle (December 10, 1951 – August 3, 2019) is a former American football and baseball player and coach. He played football as a wide receiver and tight end for the San Diego State Aztecs in 1972 and 1973 and professional football for the Philadelphia Bell and Portland Thunder in 1975. He later coached high school football and baseball in San Diego County, California, for over 30 years.

== Early life ==
Nogle was born in 1951 in Whittier, California, and attended Monte Vista High School in Whittier. He was a star in both baseball an football and was drafted by the California Angels in the third round of the 1971 MLB January Draft.

== College football ==
Nogle attended Rio Hondo Junior College in Whittier. He played both baseball (as an outfielder) and football at Rio Hondo and won all-conference honors in both sports. He also played defensive back at Rio Hondo and was selected as the team's most valuable player in 1971.

As a junior in the fall of 1972, Nogle transferred to San Diego State University. He played for the San Diego State Aztecs football teams in 1972 and 1973. In 1973, he ranked among the top receivers in the country with 59 receptions (third nationally) and 945 receiving yards (fifth nationally). The 1973 San Diego State Aztecs football team featured the country's top quarterback in Jesse Freitas (2,993 passing yars) and two of the country's top receivers (Nogle and Keith Denson), compiled a 9–1–1 record, and was ranked No. 19 in the final AP poll.

== Professional football ==
Overlooked in the 1974 NFL draft, Nogle played in the preseason with the San Diego Chargers in 1974. In 1975, he played for the Philadelphia Bell and Portland Thunder of the World Football League.

== Later life ==
After his playing career, Nogle worked as a teacher and football and baseball coach at Torrey Pines High School and San Dieguito High School. He died from cancer in 2019 at age 67.
