= 1973 Colorado State Rams football team =

American college football season

1973 Colorado State Rams football
- Conference: Western Athletic Conference
- Record: 5–6 (2–4 WAC)
- Head coach: Sark Arslanian (1st season)
- Offensive coordinator: Doug Gerhart (1st season)
- Defensive coordinator: Charles Armey (1st season)
- Home stadium: Hughes Stadium

1973 Western Athletic Conference football standings
	Conf.					Overall
Team	W		L		T	W		L		T
No. 9 Arizona State +	6	–	1	–	0	11	–	1	–	0
Arizona +	6	–	1	–	0	8	–	3	–	0
Utah	4	–	2	–	0	7	–	5	–	0
BYU	3	–	4	–	0	5	–	6	–	0
New Mexico	3	–	4	–	0	4	–	7	–	0
Wyoming	3	–	4	–	0	4	–	7	–	0
Colorado State	2	–	4	–	0	5	–	6	–	0
UTEP	0	–	7	–	0	0	–	11	–	0
+ – Conference co-champions; Rankings from AP Poll

The 1973 Colorado State Rams football team represented Colorado State University in the Western Athletic Conference during the 1973 NCAA Division I football season. In their first season under head coach Sark Arslanian, the Rams compiled a 5–6 record.

== Schedule ==
Date	Time	Opponent	Site	Result	Attendance	Source
September 8		Arizona	Hughes Stadium; Fort Collins, CO	L 0–31	17,217	
September 15		at BYU	Cougar Stadium; Provo, UT	W 21–13	28,285	
September 22		New Mexico State*	Hughes Stadium; Fort Collins, CO	W 31–27	25,124	
September 29		at No. 13 Arizona State	Sun Devil Stadium; Tempe, AZ	L 14–67	50,984	
October 6		at Idaho*	Idaho Stadium; Moscow, ID	W 33–30	5,720	
October 13		Utah State*^{†}	Hughes Stadium; Fort Collins, CO	L 18–34	27,103	
October 20		at Wyoming	War Memorial Stadium; Laramie, WY (rivalry)	L 3–35	19,229	
October 27		at UTEP	Sun Bowl; El Paso, TX	W 76–24	7,350	
November 3	1:00 p.m.	Toledo*	Hughes Stadium; Fort Collins, CO	W 21–14	13,798	
November 10		No. 15 Houston*	Hughes Stadium; Fort Collins, CO	L 20–28	17,532	
November 24		New Mexico	Hughes Stadium; Fort Collins, CO	L 13–30	13,727	
*Non-conference game; ^{†}Homecoming; Rankings from AP Poll released prior to the game; All times are in Mountain time
