= 1973 Arizona State Sun Devils football team =

American college football season

1973 Arizona State Sun Devils football

WAC champion Fiesta Bowl champion

Fiesta Bowl, W 28–7 vs. Pittsburgh
- Conference: Western Athletic Conference

Ranking
- Coaches: No. 10
- AP: No. 9
- Record: 11–1 (6–1 WAC)
- Head coach: Frank Kush (16th season)
- Defensive coordinator: Larry Kentera (3rd season)
- Captains: Bob Breunig; Danny White
- Home stadium: Sun Devil Stadium

1973 Western Athletic Conference football standings
	Conf.					Overall
Team	W		L		T	W		L		T
No. 9 Arizona State +	6	–	1	–	0	11	–	1	–	0
Arizona +	6	–	1	–	0	8	–	3	–	0
Utah	4	–	2	–	0	7	–	5	–	0
BYU	3	–	4	–	0	5	–	6	–	0
New Mexico	3	–	4	–	0	4	–	7	–	0
Wyoming	3	–	4	–	0	4	–	7	–	0
Colorado State	2	–	4	–	0	5	–	6	–	0
UTEP	0	–	7	–	0	0	–	11	–	0
+ – Conference co-champions; Rankings from AP Poll

The 1973 Arizona State Sun Devils football team represented Arizona State University in the 1973 NCAA Division I football season and outscored its opponents 519 to 171. Led by 16th-year head coach Frank Kush, the Sun Devils stayed home and won the Fiesta Bowl to finish at 11–1 and ninth in the final AP poll.

== Schedule ==
Date	Time	Opponent	Rank	Site	Result	Attendance	Source
September 15		at Oregon*	No. 13	Autzen Stadium; Eugene, OR	W 26–20	40,100	
September 22		Washington State*	No. 13	Sun Devil Stadium; Tempe, AZ	W 20–9	51,252	
September 29		Colorado State	No. 13	Sun Devil Stadium; Tempe, AZ	W 67–14	50,984	
October 6		at New Mexico	No. 12	University Stadium; Albuquerque, NM	W 67–24	21,139	
October 13	7:30 p.m.	San Jose State*	No. 11	Sun Devil Stadium; Tempe, AZ	W 28–3	50,827	
October 20		BYU	No. 12	Sun Devil Stadium; Tempe, AZ	W 52–12	47,137	
October 27		at Oregon State*	No. 11	Multnomah Stadium; Portland, OR	W 44–14	20,188	
November 3		at Utah	No. 8	Robert Rice Stadium; Salt Lake City, UT	L 31–36	22,135	
November 10		Wyoming	No. 14	Sun Devil Stadium; Tempe, AZ	W 47–0	49,880	
November 17		at UTEP	No. 13	Sun Bowl; El Paso, TX	W 54–13	7,400	
November 24		Arizona	No. 13	Sun Devil Stadium; Tempe, AZ (Territorial Cup)	W 55–19	51,383	
December 21		vs. Pittsburgh*	No. 10	Sun Devil Stadium; Tempe, AZ (Fiesta Bowl)	W 28–7	50,878	
*Non-conference game; Rankings from AP Poll released prior to the game; All times are in Mountain time

== Game summaries ==
=== Arizona ===
Team	1	2	3	4	Total
Arizona	6	13	0	0	19
• Arizona St	16	12	13	14	55

- Date: November 24
- Location: Sun Devil Stadium • Tempe, Arizona
- Game attendance: 51,383

Scoring summary
1	ASU	Hudson 15-yard pass from White (Kush kick)	Arizona St 7-0
1	ASU	Kush 24-yard field goal	Arizona St 10-0
1	ARIZ	Upchurch 2-yard run (kick failed)	Arizona St 10-6
1	ASU	Owens 8-yard pass from White (kick failed)	Arizona St 16-6
2	ARIZ	Upchurch 1-yard run (Gorham kick)	Arizona St 16-13
2	ASU	Owens 14-yard pass from White (kick failed)	Arizona St 22-13
2	ARIZ	Hamilton 4-yard pass from Hill (kick failed)	Arizona St 22-20
2	ASU	Owens 58-yard pass from White (kick failed)	Arizona St 28-20
3	ASU	Green 11-yard run (run failed)	Arizona St 34-20
3	ASU	Owens 6-yard run (Kush kick)	Arizona St 41-20
4	ASU	Malone 9-yard run (Kush kick)	Arizona St 48-20
4	ASU	Hudson recovered fumble in end zone (Kush kick)	Arizona St 55-20

Arizona State clinches a share of WAC title and third straight trip to the Fiesta Bowl. Morris Owens went over 1,000 yards receiving for the season while both Woody Green and Benny Malone surpassed the same mark in rushing yardage.

== Roster ==
1973 Arizona State Sun Devils football team roster
Players
Coaches
Offense

Pos.	#	Name	Class
QB	14	Kirk Carter	Fr
RB	22	Woody Green	Sr
WR	88	Steve Hale	Sr
QB	15	Bill Kenney	Fr
RB	32	Benny Malone	Sr
WR	24	Morris Owens	Jr
QB	11	Danny White	Sr

Defense

Pos.	#	Name	Class
LB	50	Bob Breunig	Jr
LB	53	Larry Gordon	So
CB	40	Michael Haynes	So
S	43	Alex Stencel	So

Special teams

Pos.	#	Name	Class

Head coach

- Frank Kush (16th year)

Coordinators/assistant coaches

Legend

- (C) Team captain
- (S) Suspended
- (I) Ineligible
- Injured
- Redshirt

== Awards and honors ==
- All-Americans: HB Woody Green - Consensus - Football Coaches of America, Sporting News, Time, UPI (second), AP (second), Walter Camp, QB Danny White - Football Writers, Time, UPI (second), AP (second), NEA
- All-WAC: OT Steve Gunther, OG John Houser, QB/P Danny White, HB Woody Green, DE Sam Johnson, DE Larry Shorty, LB Bob Breunig, DB Mike Haynes, K Danny Kush (honorable mention), DB Bo Warren (honorable mention), DB Kory Schuknecht (honorable mention), RS Morris Owens (honorable mention), C Ed Kindig (honorable mention), DT Deke Ballard (honorable mention), DT Neal Skarin (honorable mention), MG Sal Olivo (honorable mention), LB James Baker (honorable mention)

== NFL draft ==
Four Sun Devils were selected in the 1974 NFL draft, which lasted 17 rounds (442 selections).

Player	Position	Round	Pick	NFL club
Woody Green	Running back	1st	16	Kansas City Chiefs
Benny Malone	Running back	2nd	47	Miami Dolphins
Danny White	Quarterback	3rd	53	Dallas Cowboys
Monroe Eley ^	Running back	5th	128	Atlanta Falcons

^ Eley last played for ASU in 1971; he was in the Canadian Football League (1972–74) with the BC Lions.
