= 1973 Northern Arizona Lumberjacks football team =

American college football season

1973 Northern Arizona Lumberjacks football
- Conference: Big Sky Conference
- Record: 4–6 (2–3 Big Sky)
- Head coach: Ed Peasley (3rd season)
- Home stadium: Lumberjack Stadium

1973 Big Sky Conference football standings
	Conf.					Overall
Team	W		L		T	W		L		T
No. 5 Boise State $^	6	–	0	–	0	10	–	3	–	0
Montana State	5	–	1	–	0	7	–	4	–	0
Idaho	3	–	2	–	0	4	–	7	–	0
Northern Arizona	2	–	3	–	0	4	–	6	–	0
Montana	2	–	4	–	0	4	–	6	–	0
Weber State	2	–	4	–	0	3	–	8	–	0
Idaho State	0	–	6	–	0	2	–	9	–	0
$ – Conference champion; ^ – NCAA Division II playoff participant; Idaho was classified as Division I. All the other teams were classified as Division II.; Rankings from AP small college poll

The 1973 Northern Arizona Lumberjacks football team represented Northern Arizona University as a member of the Big Sky Conference during the 1973 NCAA Division II football season. Led by third-year head coach Ed Peasley, the Lumberjacks compiled an overall record of 4–6, with a mark of 2–3 in conference play, and finished fourth in the Big Sky.

== Schedule ==
Date	Opponent	Site	Result	Attendance	Source
September 8	at North Dakota State*	Dacotah Field; Fargo, ND	L 7–36	8,600	
September 22	at Weber State	Wildcat Stadium; Ogden, UT	L 13–25	11,146	
September 29	Montana	Lumberjack Stadium; Flagstaff, AZ	W 14–10	8,500	
October 6	at No. 9 Louisiana Tech*	Joe Aillet Stadium; Ruston, LA	L 7–37	15,600	
October 13	Texas Lutheran*	Lumberjack Stadium; Flagstaff, AZ	W 28–14	4,400	
October 20	at No. 11 Boise State	Bronco Stadium; Boise, ID	L 6–21	10,112	
October 27	Cal State Northridge*	Lumberjack Stadium; Flagstaff, AZ	W 77–17	7,800	
November 3	Montana State	Lumberjack Stadium; Flagstaff, AZ	L 0–45	3,100	
November 10	at No. 9 UNLV*	Las Vegas Stadium; Whitney, NV	L 14–42	12,124	
November 22	at Idaho State	ASISU Minidome; Pocatello, ID	W 35–7	5,300	
*Non-conference game; Rankings from AP Poll released prior to the game
