= 1973 San Diego State Aztecs football team =

American college football season

1973 San Diego State Aztecs football

PCAA champion
- Conference: Pacific Coast Athletic Association

Ranking
- Coaches: No. 19
- Record: 9–1–1 (3–0–1 PCAA)
- Head coach: Claude Gilbert (1st season)
- Offensive coordinator: Ted Tollner (1st season)
- Offensive scheme: Pro-style
- Base defense: 4–3
- Home stadium: San Diego Stadium

1973 Pacific Coast Athletic Association football standings
	Conf.					Overall
Team	W		L		T	W		L		T
San Diego State $	3	–	0	–	1	9	–	1	–	1
San Jose State	2	–	0	–	2	5	–	4	–	2
Pacific (CA)	2	–	1	–	1	7	–	2	–	1
Fresno State	1	–	3	–	0	2	–	9	–	0
Long Beach State	0	–	4	–	0	1	–	9	–	1
$ – Conference champion

The 1973 San Diego State Aztecs football team represented California State University San Diego (Note: San Diego State University was known as California State University, San Diego from 1972 to 1973.) during the 1973 NCAA Division I football season as a member of the Pacific Coast Athletic Association. (Note: The Big West Conference was known as the Pacific Coast Athletic Association from its founding in 1969 through 1987.)

The team was led by head coach Claude Gilbert, in his first year, and played home games at San Diego Stadium (Note: San Diego County Credit Union Stadium (SDCCU Stadium) was known as San Diego Stadium from its opening in 1967 through 1980.) in San Diego, California. They finished the season as Conference Champion for the second consecutive year, with a record of nine wins, one loss and one tie (9–1–1, 3–0–1 PCAA).

The team featured the country's top quarterback in Jesse Freitas (2,993 passing yars) and two of the country's top receivers in Darold Nogle and Keith Denson.

== Schedule ==
Date	Time	Opponent	Site	Result	Attendance	Source
September 22		at Utah State*	Romney Stadium; Logan, UT	W 35–7	10,225	
September 30	7:30 p.m.	Kent State*	San Diego Stadium; San Diego, CA	W 17–9	28,416–28,461	
October 6		No. 13 Houston*	San Diego Stadium; San Diego, CA	L 9–14	37,489	
October 13		New Mexico State*	San Diego Stadium; San Diego, CA	W 27–0	36,552	
October 20	7:30 p.m.	at Pacific (CA)	Pacific Memorial Stadium; Stockton, CA	W 13–10	14,783–14,785	
October 27		Florida State*	San Diego Stadium; San Diego	W 38–17	26,492	
November 3	7:30 p.m.	at San Jose State	Spartan Stadium; San Jose, CA	T 27–27	18,501	
November 10	7:30 p.m.	Long Beach State	San Diego Stadium; San Diego, CA	W 17–2	26,961	
November 17		at Fresno State	Ratcliffe Stadium; Fresno, CA (rivalry)	W 41–6	6,419	
November 24	7:30 p.m.	North Texas State*	San Diego Stadium; San Diego, CA	W 56–9	17,383	
December 1		Iowa State*	San Diego Stadium; San Diego, CA	W 41–29	38,627	
*Non-conference game; Rankings from Coaches' Poll released prior to the game; All times are in Pacific time

== Team players in the NFL ==
The following were selected in the 1974 NFL draft.

Player	Position	Round	Overall	NFL team
Claudie Minor	Tackle	3	68	Denver Broncos
Jesse Freitas	Quarterback	6	133	San Diego Chargers

The following finished their college career in 1973, were not drafted, but played in the NFL.

Player	Position	First NFL team
Herb Dobbins	Tackle	1974 Philadelphia Eagles
Keith Denson	Wide receiver	1976 New York Jets

== Team awards ==
Award	Player
Most Valuable Player (John Simcox Memorial Trophy)	Jesse Freitas
Outstanding Offensive & Defensive Linemen (Byron H. Chase Memorial Trophy)	Claudie Minor, Off; Rich Ash, Def
Team captains Dr. R. Hardy / C.E. Peterson Memorial Trophy	Jesse Freitas, Off; Joe Amaral, Def
Most Inspirational Player	Darold Nogle
