= Ed Peasley =

American football player and coach

Biographical details
- Born: c. 1935; Mendota, Illinois, U.S.
- Education: University of Washington

Playing career
- 1956: Compton
- 1957–1959: Washington
- Position: End

Coaching career (HC unless noted)
- 1961–1965: Washington (assistant)
- 1966–1967: Stanford (assistant)
- 1968–1969: Stanford (DL)
- 1970: Stanford (LB)
- 1971–1974: Northern Arizona
- 1975: The Hawaiians (assistant)
- 1976–1977: Indio HS (CA)

Head coaching record
- Overall: 15–35 (college)

Ed Peasley (born c. 1935) is an American former football player and coach. He served as the head football coach at Northern Arizona University from 1971 to 1974.

== High school ==
Peasley attended Mendota Township High School in Mendota, Illinois.

== College career ==
Peasley initially attended Compton Junior College, earning Little All-American honors at end and played in the Junior Rose Bowl in 1956. Peasley was a letterman for the Washington Huskies at end from 1957 to 1959.

== Coaching career ==
Peasley began his coaching career at Washington, coaching as an assistant from 1961 to 1965. Peasley then coached at Stanford in a variety of roles from 1966 to 1970. Northern Arizona University gave Peasley a head coaching role, where he served from 1971 to 1974, compiling a 15–35 record. After four losing seasons he was fired along, with four assistants, in November 1974. Peasley joined The Hawaiians of the World Football League (WFL) as an assistant in 1975, the league's final season. He served as a head football coach at Indio High School from 1976 to 1977.

== Head coaching record ==
Year	Team	Overall	Conference	Standing	Bowl/playoffs
Northern Arizona Lumberjacks (Big Sky Conference) (1971–1974)
1971	Northern Arizona	5–5	1–3	6th	
1972	Northern Arizona	3–8	0–4	7th	
1973	Northern Arizona	4–6	2–3	3rd	
1974	Northern Arizona	3–6	2–3	5th	
Northern Arizona:		15–25	5–13		
Total:		15–25			
