= 1973 UC Davis Aggies football team =

American college football season

1973 UC Davis Aggies football

FWC champion
- Conference: Far Western Conference
- Record: 7–3 (4–1 FWC)
- Head coach: Jim Sochor (4th season)
- Captains: Lincoln Ellis; Ron Sockolov
- Home stadium: Toomey Field

1973 Far Western Conference football standings
	Conf.					Overall
Team	W		L		T	W		L		T
UC Davis +	4	–	1	–	0	7	–	3	–	0
Chico State +	4	–	1	–	0	7	–	3	–	0
San Francisco State	3	–	2	–	0	7	–	2	–	1
Cal State Hayward	3	–	2	–	0	3	–	7	–	0
Humboldt State	1	–	4	–	0	2	–	6	–	2
Sacramento State	0	–	5	–	0	1	–	9	–	0
+ – Conference co-champions

The 1973 UC Davis Aggies football team represented the University of California, Davis as a member of the Far Western Conference (FWC) during the 1973 NCAA Division II football season. Led by fourth-year head coach Jim Sochor, UC Davis compiled an overall record of 7–3 with a mark of 4–1 in conference play, sharing the FWC title with Chico State and finishing at champions for the third consecutive season. 1973 was the fourth consecutive winning season for the Aggies. The team outscored its opponents 217 to 153 for the season. The Aggies played home games at Toomey Field in Davis, California.

== Schedule ==
Date	Opponent	Site	Result	Attendance	Source
September 14	at Cal State Fullerton*	Santa Ana Stadium; Santa Ana, CA	L 10–17	4,504–6,123	
September 22	UC Riverside*	Toomey Field; Davis, CA	W 28–3	6,400	
September 29	at Santa Clara*	Buck Shaw Stadium; Santa Clara, CA	W 13–10	8,429	
October 13	Chico State	Toomey Field; Davis, CA	W 21–10	7,800	
October 20	at Cal State Hayward	Pioneer Stadium; Hayward, CA	L 20–47	3,248	
October 27	Sacramento State	Toomey Field; Davis, CA (rivlary)	W 24–15	6,000–6,800	
November 3	Humboldt State	Toomey Field; Davis, CA	W 31–0	5,000–5,200	
November 10	Nevada*	Toomey Field; Davis, CA	W 17–6	4,600	
November 17	San Francisco State	Toomey Field; Davis, CA	W 22–13	5,500–6,500	
November 24	No. 8 Boise State*	Toomey Field; Davis, CA	L 31–32	4,300	
*Non-conference game; Rankings from UPI Poll released prior to the game
