= 1973 UTEP Miners football team =

American college football season

1973 UTEP Miners football
- Conference: Western Athletic Conference
- Record: 0–11 (0–7 WAC)
- Head coach: Tommy Hudspeth (2nd season)
- Home stadium: Sun Bowl

1973 Western Athletic Conference football standings
	Conf.					Overall
Team	W		L		T	W		L		T
No. 9 Arizona State +	6	–	1	–	0	11	–	1	–	0
Arizona +	6	–	1	–	0	8	–	3	–	0
Utah	4	–	2	–	0	7	–	5	–	0
BYU	3	–	4	–	0	5	–	6	–	0
New Mexico	3	–	4	–	0	4	–	7	–	0
Wyoming	3	–	4	–	0	4	–	7	–	0
Colorado State	2	–	4	–	0	5	–	6	–	0
UTEP	0	–	7	–	0	0	–	11	–	0
+ – Conference co-champions; Rankings from AP Poll

The 1973 UTEP Miners football team was an American football team that represented the University of Texas at El Paso in the Western Athletic Conference during the 1973 NCAA Division I football season. In their second year under head coach Tommy Hudspeth, the team compiled a 0–11 record.

== Schedule ==
Date	Opponent	Site	Result	Attendance	Source
September 8	at Idaho*	Idaho Stadium; Moscow, ID	L 14–62	8,500	
September 15	Pacific (CA)*	Sun Bowl; El Paso, TX	L 9–34	13,670	
September 22	at Utah	Robert Rice Stadium; Salt Lake City, UT	L 6–82	27,143	
September 29	at Wyoming	War Memorial Stadium; Laramie, WY	L 8–31	17,752	
October 6	New Mexico State*	Sun Bowl; El Paso, TX (rivalry)	L 23–27	9,745	
October 13	Lamar*	Sun Bowl; El Paso, TX	L 27–31	8,385	
October 20	at New Mexico	University Stadium; Albuquerque, NM	L 0–49	12,300	
October 27	Colorado State^{†}	Sun Bowl; El Paso, TX	L 24–76	7,350	
November 3	Arizona	Sun Bowl; El Paso, TX	L 18–35	6,940	
November 17	No. 13 Arizona State	Sun Bowl; El Paso, TX	L 13–54	7,400	
December 1	BYU	Sun Bowl; El Paso, TX	L 0–63	6,100	
*Non-conference game; ^{†}Homecoming; Rankings from AP Poll released prior to the game
