= 1973 Weber State Wildcats football team =

American college football season

1973 Weber State Wildcats football
- Conference: Big Sky Conference
- Record: 3–8 (2–4 Big Sky)
- Head coach: Dick Gwinn (1st season)
- Home stadium: Wildcat Stadium

1973 Big Sky Conference football standings
	Conf.					Overall
Team	W		L		T	W		L		T
No. 5 Boise State $^	6	–	0	–	0	10	–	3	–	0
Montana State	5	–	1	–	0	7	–	4	–	0
Idaho	3	–	2	–	0	4	–	7	–	0
Northern Arizona	2	–	3	–	0	4	–	6	–	0
Montana	2	–	4	–	0	4	–	6	–	0
Weber State	2	–	4	–	0	3	–	8	–	0
Idaho State	0	–	6	–	0	2	–	9	–	0
$ – Conference champion; ^ – NCAA Division II playoff participant; Idaho was classified as Division I. All the other teams were classified as Division II.; Rankings from AP small college poll

The 1973 Weber State Wildcats football team represented Weber State College (now known as Weber State University) as a member of the Big Sky Conference during the 1973 NCAA Division II football season. Led by first-year head coach Dick Gwinn, the Wildcats compiled an overall record of 3–8, with a mark of 2–4 in conference play, and finished tied for fifth in the Big Sky.

== Schedule ==
Date	Opponent	Site	Result	Attendance	Source
September 15	Utah State*	Wildcat Stadium; Ogden, UT	L 3–10	17,312	
September 22	Northern Arizona	Wildcat Stadium; Ogden, UT	W 25–13	11,146	
September 29	Cal State Fullerton*	Wildcat Stadium; Ogden, UT	W 16–14	9,030	
October 6	No. 8 Boise State	Wildcat Stadium; Ogden, UT	L 7–34	11,586	
October 13	at Montana State	Sales Stadium; Bozeman, MT	L 0–33	9,837	
October 20	at Idaho	Idaho Stadium; Moscow, ID	L 13–17	10,670	
October 27	at Idaho State	ASISU Minidome; Pocatello, ID	W 38–23	9,000	
November 3	at Southern Miss*	Faulkner Field; Hattiesburg, MS	L 7–28	10,100	
November 10	Montana	Wildcat Stadium; Ogden, UT	L 0–10	7,389	
November 17	at BYU*	Cougar Stadium; Provo, UT	L 14–45	14,548	
November 22	at Eastern Michigan*	Rynearson Stadium; Ypsilanti, MI	L 7–44	2,500	
*Non-conference game; Rankings from AP Poll released prior to the game
