= 1973 Idaho Vandals football team =

American college football season

1973 Idaho Vandals football
- Conference: Big Sky Conference
- Record: 4–7 (3–2 Big Sky)
- Head coach: Don Robbins (4th season)
- Offensive coordinator: Don Matthews (1st season)
- Offensive scheme: Veer
- Defensive coordinator: Tom Roth (1st season)
- Base defense: 4–3
- Captains: Rick Seefried; Alan Vance
- Home stadium: Idaho Stadium

1973 Big Sky Conference football standings
	Conf.					Overall
Team	W		L		T	W		L		T
No. 5 Boise State $^	6	–	0	–	0	10	–	3	–	0
Montana State	5	–	1	–	0	7	–	4	–	0
Idaho	3	–	2	–	0	4	–	7	–	0
Northern Arizona	2	–	3	–	0	4	–	6	–	0
Montana	2	–	4	–	0	4	–	6	–	0
Weber State	2	–	4	–	0	3	–	8	–	0
Idaho State	0	–	6	–	0	2	–	9	–	0
$ – Conference champion; ^ – NCAA Division II playoff participant; Idaho was classified as Division I. All the other teams were classified as Division II.; Rankings from AP small college poll

The 1973 Idaho Vandals football team represented the University of Idaho in the 1973 NCAA Division I football season. The Vandals were led by fourth-year head coach Don Robbins and were members of the Big Sky Conference, then in Division II for football. They played their home games at new Idaho Stadium, an unlit outdoor facility on campus in Moscow, Idaho.

== Season ==
With quarterbacks Rick Seefried, Dave Comstock, and Dennis Ballock running the veer offense, the Vandals were 4–7 overall and 3–2 in the Big Sky.

In the Battle of the Palouse, Idaho suffered a sixth straight loss to neighbor Washington State of the Pac-8, falling 51–24 at Martin Stadium in Pullman on September 29.

In their third game with new rival Boise State and first in Moscow, the Vandals fell at home 47–24 on September 15; this was the only outdoor meeting in Moscow in the series. The Broncos went on to win the first of three consecutive conference championships. Idaho did not schedule Northern Arizona until 1975 and both played only five games in conference.

At the conclusion of the season, Robbins' contract was not renewed. He was succeeded by Ed Troxel, a Vandal assistant coach since 1967 and also the head coach of the track team.

== Division I ==
Through 1977, the Big Sky was a Division II conference for football, except for Division I member Idaho, which moved down to I-AA in 1978. Idaho maintained its upper division status in the NCAA by playing Division I non-conference opponents (and was ineligible for the Division II postseason).

== Schedule ==
Date	Time	Opponent	Site	Result	Attendance	Source
September 8	1:30 pm	UTEP*	Idaho Stadium; Moscow, ID	W 62–14	8,500	
September 15	1:30 pm	Boise State	Idaho Stadium; Moscow, ID (rivalry)	L 24–47	17,104	
September 22	11:30 am	at Iowa State*	Clyde Williams Field; Ames, IA	L 0–48	31,000	
September 29	1:30 pm	at Washington State*	Martin Stadium; Pullman, WA (Battle of the Palouse)	L 24–51	22,500	
October 6	1:30 pm	Colorado State*	Idaho Stadium; Moscow, ID	L 30–33	5,720	
October 13	5:30 pm	at TCU*	Amon G. Carter Stadium; Fort Worth, TX	L 14–30	15,110	
October 20	1:30 pm	Weber State^{†}	Idaho Stadium; Moscow, ID	W 17–13	10,670	
October 27	1:30 pm	Montana State	Idaho Stadium; Moscow, ID	L 14–35	7,068	
November 3	12:30 pm	at Montana	Dornblaser Field; Missoula, MT (Little Brown Stein)	W 20–7	4,300	
November 10	1:30 pm	at Washington*	Husky Stadium; Seattle, WA	L 14–41	47,000	
November 17	12:30 pm	Idaho State	Idaho Stadium; Moscow, ID	W 43–0	6,879	
*Non-conference game; ^{†}Homecoming; All times are in Pacific time

== Roster ==
1973 Idaho Vandals football team roster
Players
Coaches
Offense

Pos.	#	Name	Class
QB	12	Dennis Ballock	Jr
QB	14	Dave Comstock	So
WR	16	Jerry Williams
QB	18	Rick Seefried (C)	Sr
WR, P	20	Kirk Dennis	Jr
WR	21	Collie Mack	Jr
RB	22	Dennis Mitchell	Jr
RB	23	Monty Nash	Fr
WR	27	Jerome Dowdy	Jr
RB	30	Mark Fredback	Jr
WR	31	Jim Welch	Sr
RB	33	Marshall Brantley	Fr
RB	36	Rich Brown	Jr
RB	42	Rob Dean	Jr
FB	44	J.C. Chadband	So
TE	45	Kevin McAfee	Fr
OL	51	Mike Kramer	So
C	56	John Yarno	Fr
LG	62	John Adams	So
RG	65	Kurt Nelson	Jr
C	67	Craig Pritchard	Sr
OL	69	Dave Hershey	Jr
LT	70	Jerry Sinclair	Sr
OL	72	Scott Callahan	Jr
LG	73	Pat Fee	Sr
OL	75	Clarence Hough	Fr
RT	76	Bob Van Duyne	Sr
RG	79	Kevin Wolske	Sr
WR, DB	80	Jay Curcio	Sr
TE	82	Steve Duncanson	So
WR	83	Tim Coles	So
TE	85	Bill Kashetta	Sr

Defense

Pos.	#	Name	Class
SS	10	Syd Lofton	So
FS	11	Bucky Bruns	Sr
CB	24	Ross Nelson	Jr
CB	25	Randy Hall	Sr
SS	26	Curt Parsons	So
DB	38	Joe White	Jr
DB	40	Johnny Sims	So
DB	43	Chris Mooney	Sr
LB	50	Randy Dorn	Jr
LB	52	Kevin Robison	Sr
LB	53	Duke Minium	Jr
LB	54	Fred Morscheck	Sr
LB	55	Vince Howard	Jr
LB	58	Kjel Kiilsgaard	Fr
LB	59	John Kirtland	Fr
LB	60	Brian Scott	Jr
LB	61	Chuck Blanck	Sr
LB	63	Bill Kirtland	So
DT	68	Lloyd Grimsrud	Sr
DL	71	Rick Attishin	Jr
DL	74	Jim Allen	Jr
DT	77	Ed Arnold	Fr
DT	78	Lorne Sherbina	Sr
DL	81	Doug Fisher	So
DE	84	Alofa Tauvage	Sr
DE	86	Tom Doud	Sr
DE	87	Alan Vance (C)	Sr
DE	88	Mark Hodges	Jr
LB	89	Chris Tormey	Fr

Special teams

Pos.	#	Name	Class
PK, P	7	Steve Tanner	Jr
PK	16	Chuck Filippini
KR	31	Jim Welch	Sr

Head coach

- Don Robbins (4th year)

Coordinators/assistant coaches

- Don Matthews (OC)
- Tom Roth (DC)
- Hoyt Keeney (DL)
- Gary Knecht (LB)
- Tom Manke (QB)
- Ed Troxel (RB)

Legend

- (C) Team captain
- (S) Suspended
- (I) Ineligible
- Injured
- Redshirt

== All-conference ==
Four Vandals were selected to the Big Sky all-conference team: tight end Bill Kashetta, defensive tackle Lloyd Grimsrud, cornerback Randy Hall and safety Bucky Bruns. Three were named to the second team (honorable mention): running back Mark Fredback, wide receiver Tim Coles, and offensive tackle Bob Van Duyne.

== NFL draft ==
Two Vandal seniors were selected in the 1974 NFL draft, which lasted 17 rounds (442 selections).

Player	Position	Round	Overall	Franchise
Bob Van Duyne	G	10th	240	Baltimore Colts
Randy Hall	DB	13th	317	Baltimore Colts
