= 1973 Sacramento State Hornets football team =

American college football season

1973 Sacramento State Hornets football
- Conference: Far Western Conference
- Record: 1–9 (0–5 FWC)
- Head coach: Ray Clemons (13th season)
- Home stadium: Hornet Stadium

1973 Far Western Conference football standings
	Conf.					Overall
Team	W		L		T	W		L		T
UC Davis +	4	–	1	–	0	7	–	3	–	0
Chico State +	4	–	1	–	0	7	–	3	–	0
San Francisco State	3	–	2	–	0	7	–	2	–	1
Cal State Hayward	3	–	2	–	0	3	–	7	–	0
Humboldt State	1	–	4	–	0	2	–	6	–	2
Sacramento State	0	–	5	–	0	1	–	9	–	0
+ – Conference co-champions

The 1973 Sacramento State Hornets football team represented California State University, Sacramento as a member of the Far Western Conference (FWC) during the 1973 NCAA Division II football season. Led by 13th-year head coach Ray Clemons, Sacramento State compiled an overall record of 1–9 with a mark of 0–5 in conference play, placing last out of six teams in the FWC. The team was outscored by its opponents 186 to 106 for the season. The Hornets played home games at Hornet Stadium in Sacramento, California.

== Schedule ==
Date	Time	Opponent	Site	Result	Attendance	Source
September 8	7:30 p.m.	at Pacific (CA)*	Pacific Memorial Stadium; Stockton, CA	L 0–22	15,230–15,273	
September 15		at Nevada*	Mackay Stadium; Reno, NV	L 10–17		
September 22		at Cal Poly Pomona*	Kellogg Field; Pomona, CA	L 17–31	2,000–2,200	
September 29		Saint Mary's*	Hornet Stadium; Sacramento, CA	W 28–7	1,400	
October 6		Cal State Hayward	Hornet Stadium; Sacramento, CA	L 6–14	1,000	
October 20		at Humboldt State	Redwood Bowl; Arcata, CA	L 0–7	1,200	
October 27		at UC Davis	Toomey Field; Davis, CA (rivalry)	L 15–24	6,000–6,800	
November 3		San Francisco State	Hornet Stadium; Sacramento, CA	L 23–28	450	
November 10		at Cal State Fullerton*	Hornet Stadium; Sacramento, CA	L 7–15	500–1,000	
November 17		at Chico State	University Stadium; Chico, CA	L 0–21	1,500	
*Non-conference game; All times are in Pacific time
