= 1973 Cal State Fullerton Titans football team =

American college football season

1973 Cal State Fullerton Titans football
- Conference: California Collegiate Athletic Association
- Record: 7–4 (1–3 CCAA)
- Head coach: Pete Yoder (2nd season)
- Home stadium: Santa Ana Stadium

1973 California Collegiate Athletic Association football standings
| | Conf. | | | | | Overall |
| Team | W | | L | | T | W | | L | | T |
|---|---|---|---|---|---|---|---|---|---|---|
| No. 8/9 Cal Poly $ | 4 | – | 0 | – | 0 | 9 | – | 1 | – | 0 |
| UC Riverside | 3 | – | 1 | – | 0 | 8 | – | 2 | – | 0 |
| Cal State Fullerton | 1 | – | 3 | – | 0 | 7 | – | 4 | – | 0 |
| Cal Poly Pomona | 1 | – | 3 | – | 0 | 4 | – | 6 | – | 1 |
| Cal State Northridge | 1 | – | 3 | – | 0 | 2 | – | 9 | – | 0 |
$ – Conference champion; Rankings from AP/UPI small college polls

The 1973 Cal State Fullerton Titans football team represented California State University, Fullerton as a member of the California Collegiate Athletic Association (CCAA) during the 1973 NCAA Division II football season. Led by second-year head coach Pete Yoder, Cal State Fullerton compiled an overall record of 7–4 with a mark of 1–3 in conference play, placing in a three-way tie for third in the CCAA. The Titans played home games at Santa Ana Stadium in Santa Ana, California.

== Schedule ==
| Date | Time | Opponent | Site | Result | Attendance | Source |
|---|---|---|---|---|---|---|
| September 14 | | UC Davis* | Santa Ana Stadium; Santa Ana, CA | W 17–10 | 4,504–6,123 | |
| September 21 | | at Cal State Los Angeles* | Campus Field; Los Angeles, CA | W 35–14 | 2,500 | |
| September 29 | | at Weber State* | Wildcat Stadium; Ogden, UT | L 14–16 | 9,030 | |
| October 4 | 8:05 p.m. | at Long Beach State* | Anaheim Stadium; [Anaheim, CA | W 17–14 | 6,411 | |
| October 13 | | Cal State Northridge | Santa Ana Stadium; Santa Ana, CA | W 42–18 | 2,033 | |
| October 20 | | at No. 4 Cal Poly | Mustang Stadium; San Luis Obispo, CA | L 7–21 | 6,749 | |
| October 27 | | at Nevada* | Mackay Stadium; Reno, NV | W 17–10 | 7,100–7,130 | |
| November 3 | | UC Riverside | Santa Ana Stadium; Santa Ana, CA | L 10–20 | 3,619 | |
| November 10 | | at Sacramento State* | Hornet Stadium; Sacramento, CA | W 15–7 | 500–1,000 | |
| November 18 | | Cal Poly Pomona | Santa Ana Stadium; Santa Ana, CA | L 7–10 | 1,922 | |
| November 24 | | at Cal State Hayward* | Pioneer Stadium; Hayward, CA | W 22–18 | 1,018–1,500 | |
*Non-conference game; Rankings from UPI Poll released prior to the game; All times are in Pacific time
