= 1973 Cal Poly Pomona Broncos football team =

American college football season

1973 Cal Poly Pomona Broncos football
- Conference: California Collegiate Athletic Association
- Record: 4–6–1 (1–3 CCAA)
- Head coach: Roy Anderson (5th season)
- Home stadium: Kellogg Field

1973 California Collegiate Athletic Association football standings
	Conf.					Overall
Team	W		L		T	W		L		T
No. 8/9 Cal Poly $	4	–	0	–	0	9	–	1	–	0
UC Riverside	3	–	1	–	0	8	–	2	–	0
Cal State Fullerton	1	–	3	–	0	7	–	4	–	0
Cal Poly Pomona	1	–	3	–	0	4	–	6	–	1
Cal State Northridge	1	–	3	–	0	2	–	9	–	0
$ – Conference champion; Rankings from AP/UPI small college polls

The 1973 Cal Poly Pomona Broncos football team represented California State Polytechnic University, Pomona as a member of the California Collegiate Athletic Association (CCAA) during the 1973 NCAA Division II football season. Led by Roy Anderson in his fifth and final season as head coach, Cal Poly Pomona compiled an overall record of 4–6–1 with a mark of 1–3 in conference play, placing in a three-way tied for third in the CCAA. The team was outscored by its opponents 286 to 210 for the season. The Broncos played home games at Kellogg Field in Pomona, California.

== Schedule ==
Date	Opponent	Site	Result	Attendance	Source
September 8	at Fresno State*	Ratcliffe Stadium; Fresno, CA	W 17–9	8,223–10,000	
September 15	at Southern Utah State*	Eccles Coliseum; Cedar City, UT	L 18–35	1,107	
September 22	Sacramento State*	Kellogg Field; Pomona, CA	W 31–17	2,000–2,200	
September 29	Cal State Los Angeles*	Kellogg Field; Pomona, CA	T 34–34	2,000–2,500	
October 6	Cal Lutheran*	Kellogg Field; Pomona, CA	L 10–14	2,300	
October 13	at No. 5 Cal Poly	Mustang Stadium; San Luis Obispo, CA	L 0–41	6,780	
October 20	at UC Riverside	Highlander Stadium; iverside, CA	L 14–45	4,000	
November 3	Chico State*	Kellogg Field; Pomona, CA	L 34–35	2,455	
November 10	at Cal State Northridge	Devonshire Downs; Northridge, CA	L 7–20	1,500–2,400	
November 18	at Cal State Fullerton	Santa Ana Stadium; Santa Ana, CA	W 10–7	1,922	
November 24	at United States International*	Balboa Stadium; San Diego, CA	W 35–29	1,000–1,500	
*Non-conference game; Rankings from UPI Poll released prior to the game
