= 1973 Northern Iowa Panthers football team =

American college football season

1973 Northern Iowa Panthers football
- Conference: North Central Conference
- Record: 5–5 (2–5 NCC)
- Head coach: Stan Sheriff (14th season)
- Defensive coordinator: Dennis Remmert (3rd season)
- Home stadium: O. R. Latham Stadium

1973 North Central Conference football standings
	Conf.					Overall
Team	W		L		T	W		L		T
No. 14 North Dakota State +	6	–	1	–	0	8	–	2	–	0
No. 11 South Dakota +^	6	–	1	–	0	8	–	3	–	0
Mankato State	4	–	3	–	0	7	–	4	–	0
North Dakota	4	–	3	–	0	6	–	4	–	0
Augustana (SD)	3	–	3	–	1	6	–	3	–	1
South Dakota State	2	–	4	–	1	5	–	5	–	1
Northern Iowa	2	–	5	–	0	5	–	5	–	0
Morningside	0	–	7	–	0	0	–	9	–	0
+ – Conference co-champions; ^ – NCAA Division II playoff participant; Rankings from AP small college poll

The 1973 Northern Iowa Panthers football team was an American football team that represented the University of Northern Iowa as a member of the North Central Conference (NCC) during the 1973 NCAA Division II football season. In its 14th season under head coach Stan Sheriff, the team compiled a 5–5 record (2–5 in conference games) and finished in seventh place out of eight teams in the NCC.

The team's statistical leaders included freshman quarterback Bill Salmon (963 passing yards), junior halfback Pat Batten (645 rushing yards), sophomore split end Dave Schooley (483 receiving yards), senior halfback Dave Hodam (36 points scored), and senior free safety Mike Woodley (7 interceptions). Two Northern Iowa players were named to the all-NCC team: Woodley and center Steve Lounsberry.

The team played its home games at O. R. Latham Stadium in Cedar Falls, Iowa.

== Schedule ==
Date	Opponent	Site	Result	Attendance	Source
September 8	Pittsburg State*	O. R. Latham Stadium; Cedar Falls, IA	W 13–0	3,250	
September 15	Western Illinois*	O. R. Latham Stadium; Cedar Falls, IA	W 20–14	5,850	
September 22	at Mankato State	Blakeslee Stadium; Mankato, MN	L 7–28	3,785	
September 29	No. 3 South Dakota^{†}	O. R. Latham Stadium; Cedar Falls, IA	L 7–19	7,025	
October 6	at No. 12 North Dakota State	Dacotah Field; Fargo, ND	L 0–21	6,700	
October 13	at Drake*	Drake Stadium; Des Moines, IA	W 31–3	13,960	
October 20	at Morningside	Roberts Field; Sioux City, IA	W 28–14	2,000	
October 27	North Dakota	O. R. Latham Stadium; Cedar Falls, IA	W 17–14	6,000	
November 3	at South Dakota State	Coughlin–Alumni Stadium; Brookings, SD	L 0–16	1,023	
November 10	Augustana (SD)	O. R. Latham Stadium; Cedar Falls, IA	L 9–36	3,500	
*Non-conference game; ^{†}Homecoming; Rankings from AP Poll released prior to the game
