= 1973 Cal Poly Mustangs football team =

American college football season

1973 Cal Poly Mustangs football

CCAA champion
- Conference: California Collegiate Athletic Association

Ranking
- Coaches: No. 9 (UPI small college)
- AP: No. 8 (small college)
- Record: 9–1 (4–0 CCAA)
- Head coach: Joe Harper (6th season)
- Home stadium: Mustang Stadium

1973 California Collegiate Athletic Association football standings
	Conf.					Overall
Team	W		L		T	W		L		T
No. 8/9 Cal Poly $	4	–	0	–	0	9	–	1	–	0
UC Riverside	3	–	1	–	0	8	–	2	–	0
Cal State Fullerton	1	–	3	–	0	7	–	4	–	0
Cal Poly Pomona	1	–	3	–	0	4	–	6	–	1
Cal State Northridge	1	–	3	–	0	2	–	9	–	0
$ – Conference champion; Rankings from AP/UPI small college polls

The 1973 Cal Poly Mustangs football team represented California Polytechnic State University, San Luis Obispo as a member of the California Collegiate Athletic Association (CCAA) during the 1973 NCAA Division II football season. Led by sixth-year head coach Joe Harper, Cal Poly compiled an overall record of 9–1 with a mark of 4–0 in conference play, winning the CCAA title for the fifth consecutive season. The Mustangs were ranked No. 8 by the Associated Press and No. 9 by the United Press International in the final small college rankings. Cal Poly played home games at Mustang Stadium in San Luis Obispo, California.

== Schedule ==
Date	Time	Opponent	Rank	Site	Result	Attendance	Source
September 15		at Cal State Northridge		Devonshire Downs; Northridge, CA	W 65–20	3,300	
September 22		Idaho State*	No. 8	Mustang Stadium; San Luis Obispo, CA	W 20–10	6,929	
September 29		at UC Riverside	No. 7	Highlander Stadium; Riverside, CA	W 26–17	3,500	
October 13		Cal Poly Pomona	No. 5	Mustang Stadium; San Luis Obispo, CA	W 41–0	6,780	
October 20		Cal State Fullerton	No. 4	Mustang Stadium; San Luis Obispo, CA	W 21–7	6,749	
October 27		Fresno State*	No. 3	Mustang Stadium; San Luis Obispo, CA	W 28–14	7,459	
November 3		at Cal State Hayward*	No. 3	Pioneer Stadium; Hayward, CA	W 58–0	3,200	
November 10		at Cal Lutheran*	No. 4	Mt. Clef Field; Thousand Oaks, CA	W 63–14	5,000	
November 17		at No. 11 Boise State*	No. 4	Bronco Stadium; Boise, ID	L 10–42	13,885	
November 24	1:00 p.m.	Long Beach State*	No. 10	Mustang Stadium; San Luis Obispo, CA	W 31–7	3,086	
*Non-conference game; Rankings from UPI Poll released prior to the game; All times are in Pacific time
