= 1973 Boise State Broncos football team =

American college football season

1973 Boise State Broncos football

Big Sky champion

Division II Semifinal - Pioneer Bowl, L 34–38 vs. Louisiana Tech
- Conference: Big Sky Conference

Ranking
- Coaches: No. 8 (small college)
- AP: No. 5 (small college)
- Record: 10–3 (6–0 Big Sky)
- Head coach: Tony Knap (6th season)
- Home stadium: Bronco Stadium

1973 Big Sky Conference football standings
	Conf.					Overall
Team	W		L		T	W		L		T
No. 5 Boise State $^	6	–	0	–	0	10	–	3	–	0
Montana State	5	–	1	–	0	7	–	4	–	0
Idaho	3	–	2	–	0	4	–	7	–	0
Northern Arizona	2	–	3	–	0	4	–	6	–	0
Montana	2	–	4	–	0	4	–	6	–	0
Weber State	2	–	4	–	0	3	–	8	–	0
Idaho State	0	–	6	–	0	2	–	9	–	0
$ – Conference champion; ^ – NCAA Division II playoff participant; Idaho was classified as Division I. All the other teams were classified as Division II.; Rankings from AP small college poll

The 1973 Boise State Broncos football team represented Boise State College during the 1973 NCAA Division II football season, the sixth season of Bronco football (at the four-year level) and the first in the newly reorganized Division II. The Broncos were in their fourth year as members of the Big Sky Conference (and NCAA) and played their home games on campus at Bronco Stadium in Boise, Idaho.

Led by sixth-year head coach Tony Knap, the Broncos were 9–2 in the regular season and undefeated in conference (6–0) to win their first Big Sky title. Invited to the inaugural eight-team Division II playoffs, BSC hosted a 53–10 quarterfinal win over South Dakota. In the semifinals, the Broncos lost 38–34 to Louisiana Tech in the Pioneer Bowl in Texas, giving up a touchdown in the final seconds and finished at 10–3.

== Schedule ==
Date	Time	Opponent	Rank	Site	Result	Attendance	Source
September 15	2:30 pm	at Idaho		Idaho Stadium; Moscow, ID (rivalry)	W 47–24	17,104	
September 22	7:30 pm	Montana State	No. 10	Bronco Stadium; Boise, ID	W 27–17	14,521	
September 29	7:30 pm	Portland State*	No. 10	Bronco Stadium; Boise, ID	W 64–7	12,408	
October 6	7:30 pm	at Weber State	No. 8	Wildcat Stadium; Ogden, UT	W 34–7	11,586	
October 13	9:15 pm	at UNLV*	No. 5	Las Vegas Stadium; Whitney, NV	L 19–24	12,458	
October 20	1:00 pm	Northern Arizona^{†}	No. 11	Bronco Stadium; Boise, ID	W 21–6	10,112	
October 27	7:30 pm	Montana	No. 11	Bronco Stadium; Boise, ID	W 55–7	12,852	
November 3	1:00 pm	at Nevada*	No. 9	Mackay Stadium; Reno, NV (rivalry)	L 21–23	3,111	
November 10	8:00 pm	at Idaho State	No. 11	ASISU Minidome; Pocatello, ID	W 21–17	12,000	
November 17	1:30 pm	No. 4 Cal Poly*	No. 10	Bronco Stadium; Boise, ID	W 42–10	13,885	
November 24	7:30 pm	at UC Davis*	No. 8	Toomey Field; Davis, CA	W 32–31	4,300	
December 1	12:30 pm	No. 10 South Dakota*	No. 7	Bronco Stadium; Boise, ID (NCAA Division II Quarterfinal)	W 53–10	14,358	
December 8	11:30 am	vs. No. 3 Louisiana Tech*	No. 7	Memorial Stadium; Wichita Falls, TX (Pioneer Bowl—NCAA Division II Semifinal)	L 34–38	13,000	
*Non-conference game; ^{†}Homecoming; Rankings from AP Poll released prior to the game; All times are in Mountain time

== Roster ==
1973 Boise State Broncos football team roster
Players
Coaches
Offense

Pos.	#	Name	Class
QB	12	Jim McMillan	Jr
QB	15	Ron Autele	Sr
RB	21	Harry Riener	Sr
RB	22	Chester Grey	Jr
RB	40	John Smith	So
RB	42	Ron Emry	So
C	54	John Klotz	Sr
RT	60	Charlie Russell	Sr
LG	61	Glenn Sparks	So
RG	63	Dan Dixon	Sr
LT	76	Al Davis	Sr
WR	81	Don Hutt (C)	Jr
WR	89	Dick Donohue	Sr

Defense

Pos.	#	Name	Class
CB	14	Greg Frederick (C)	So
FS	25	Pat King	Sr
CB	29	Rolly Woolsey	Jr
SS	43	Jim Meeks	Jr
RLB	45	Loren Schmidt	Jr
MLB	51	Ron Davis	Jr
LLB	82	Claude Tomasini	Jr
RDT	71	Vaa Afoa	Jr
LDT	73	Blessing Bird	Sr
DL	78	Ron Franklin	Jr
LDE	83	Mark Goodman	Sr
RDE	87	Ken Mills	Jr

Special teams

Pos.	#	Name	Class
K	29	Rolly Woolsey	Jr
P	39	Gary Gorrell	So

Head coach

- Tony Knap (6th year)

Coordinators/assistant coaches

- Steve Buratto (DB, OLB)
- Charlie Dine (DL, MLB)
- Dave Nickel (OL)
- Adam Rita (WR)
- Doug Woolsey (OB)

Legend

- (C) Team captain
- (S) Suspended
- (I) Ineligible
- Injured
- Redshirt

== NFL draft ==
Three Broncos were selected in the 1974 NFL draft, which lasted 17 rounds (442 selections).

Player	Position	Round	Overall	Franchise
Don Hutt	Wide receiver	9th	213	Los Angeles Rams
Dan Dixon	Guard	13th	313	Houston Oilers
Al Davis	Guard	17th	433	Atlanta Falcons
