= 1973 Chico State Wildcats football team =

American college football season

1973 Chico State Wildcats football

FWC co-champion
- Conference: Far Western Conference
- Record: 7–3 (4–1 FWC)
- Head coach: Pete Riehlman (6th season)
- Home stadium: University Stadium

1973 Far Western Conference football standings
	Conf.					Overall
Team	W		L		T	W		L		T
UC Davis +	4	–	1	–	0	7	–	3	–	0
Chico State +	4	–	1	–	0	7	–	3	–	0
San Francisco State	3	–	2	–	0	7	–	2	–	1
Cal State Hayward	3	–	2	–	0	3	–	7	–	0
Humboldt State	1	–	4	–	0	2	–	6	–	2
Sacramento State	0	–	5	–	0	1	–	9	–	0
+ – Conference co-champions

The 1973 Chico State Wildcats football team represented California State University, Chico as a member of the Far Western Conference (FWC) during the 1973 NCAA Division II football season. Led by Pete Riehlman in his sixth and final season as head coach, Chico State compiled an overall record of 7–3 with a mark of 4–1 in conference play, sharing the FWC title with UC Davis. The team outscored its opponents 185 to 152 for the season. The Wildcats played home games at University Stadium in Chico, California.

Riehlman finished his tenure at Chico State with an overall record of 41–20, for a .672 winning percentage. That is the highest winning percentage of any head coach in the history of the Chico State Wildcats football program.

== Schedule ==
Date	Opponent	Site	Result	Attendance	Source
September 8	Southern Utah State*	University Stadium; Chico, CA	W 10–3	6,300	
September 15	at Willamette*	McCulloch Stadium; Salem, OR	W 28–14	1,500	
September 22	Nevada*	University Stadium; Chico, CA	L 3–33	3,100	
October 6	Humboldt State	University Stadium; Chico, CA	W 17–13	1,000	
October 13	at UC Davis	Toomey Field; Davis, CA	L 10–21	7,800	
October 20	San Francisco State	University Stadium; Chico, CA	W 31–7	6,082	
October 27	Simon Fraser*	University Stadium; Chico, CA	L 13–21	1,000	
November 3	at Cal Poly Pomona*	Kellogg Field; Pomona, CA	W 35–34	2,455–2,500	
November 10	at Cal State Hayward	Pioneer Stadium; Hayward, CA	W 17–6	1,000	
November 17	Sacramento State	University Stadium; Chico, CA	W 21–0	1,500	
*Non-conference game

== Team players in the NFL ==
No Chico State players were selected in the 1974 NFL draft. The following finished their Chico State career in 1973, were not drafted, but played in the NFL.

Player	Position	First NFL team
Tony Bertuca	Linebacker	1974 Baltimore Colts
