= 1973 North Dakota State Bison football team =

American college football season

1973 North Dakota State Bison football

NCC co-champion
- Conference: North Central Conference
- Record: 8–2 (6–1 NCC)
- Head coach: Ev Kjelbertson (1st season)
- Home stadium: Dacotah Field

1973 North Central Conference football standings
| | Conf. | | | | | Overall |
| Team | W | | L | | T | W | | L | | T |
|---|---|---|---|---|---|---|---|---|---|---|
| No. 14 North Dakota State + | 6 | – | 1 | – | 0 | 8 | – | 2 | – | 0 |
| No. 11 South Dakota +^ | 6 | – | 1 | – | 0 | 8 | – | 3 | – | 0 |
| Mankato State | 4 | – | 3 | – | 0 | 7 | – | 4 | – | 0 |
| North Dakota | 4 | – | 3 | – | 0 | 6 | – | 4 | – | 0 |
| Augustana (SD) | 3 | – | 3 | – | 1 | 6 | – | 3 | – | 1 |
| South Dakota State | 2 | – | 4 | – | 1 | 5 | – | 5 | – | 1 |
| Northern Iowa | 2 | – | 5 | – | 0 | 5 | – | 5 | – | 0 |
| Morningside | 0 | – | 7 | – | 0 | 0 | – | 9 | – | 0 |
+ – Conference co-champions; ^ – NCAA Division II playoff participant; Rankings from AP small college poll

The 1973 North Dakota State Bison football team was an American football team that represented North Dakota State University during the 1973 NCAA Division II football season as a member of the North Central Conference. In their first year under head coach Ev Kjelbertson, the team compiled a 8–2 record.

== Schedule ==
| Date | Opponent | Rank | Site | Result | Attendance | Source |
|---|---|---|---|---|---|---|
| September 1 | at Mankato State | | Blakeslee Stadium; Mankato, MN | W 33–17 | 3,600 | |
| September 8 | Northern Arizona* | | Dacotah Field; Fargo, ND | W 36–7 | 8,600 | |
| September 15 | Montana State* | | Dacotah Field; Fargo, ND | W 34–17 | 6,700–7,100 | |
| September 22 | South Dakota | No. 5 | Dacotah Field; Fargo, ND | L 7–9 | 10,800 | |
| September 29 | at Morningside | No. 15 | Roberts Field; Sioux City, IA | W 14–0 | 900 | |
| October 6 | Northern Iowa | No. 12 | Dacotah Field; Fargo, ND | W 21–0 | 6,700 | |
| October 13 | at Augustana (SD) | No. 10 | Howard Wood Field; Sioux Falls, SD | W 9–7 | 7,000 | |
| October 20 | North Dakota^{†} | No. 10 | Dacotah Field; Fargo, ND (Nickel Trophy) | W 21–14 | 13,500 | |
| October 27 | at South Dakota State | No. 10 | Coughlin–Alumni Stadium; Brookings, SD (rivalry) | W 24–14 | 1,350 | |
| November 3 | at Youngstown State* | No. 8 | Rayen Stadium; Youngstown, OH | L 10–12 | 2,450 | |
*Non-conference game; ^{†}Homecoming; Rankings from AP Poll released prior to the game
