= 1973 New Mexico Lobos football team =

American college football season

1973 New Mexico Lobos football
- Conference: Western Athletic Conference
- Record: 4–7 (3–4 WAC)
- Head coach: Rudy Feldman (6th season)
- Home stadium: University Stadium

1973 Western Athletic Conference football standings
| | Conf. | | | | | Overall |
| Team | W | | L | | T | W | | L | | T |
|---|---|---|---|---|---|---|---|---|---|---|
| No. 9 Arizona State + | 6 | – | 1 | – | 0 | 11 | – | 1 | – | 0 |
| Arizona + | 6 | – | 1 | – | 0 | 8 | – | 3 | – | 0 |
| Utah | 4 | – | 2 | – | 0 | 7 | – | 5 | – | 0 |
| BYU | 3 | – | 4 | – | 0 | 5 | – | 6 | – | 0 |
| New Mexico | 3 | – | 4 | – | 0 | 4 | – | 7 | – | 0 |
| Wyoming | 3 | – | 4 | – | 0 | 4 | – | 7 | – | 0 |
| Colorado State | 2 | – | 4 | – | 0 | 5 | – | 6 | – | 0 |
| UTEP | 0 | – | 7 | – | 0 | 0 | – | 11 | – | 0 |
+ – Conference co-champions; Rankings from AP Poll

The 1973 New Mexico Lobos football team was an American football team that represented the University of New Mexico in the Western Athletic Conference (WAC) during the 1973 NCAA Division I football season. In their sixth season under head coach Rudy Feldman, the Lobos compiled a 4–7 record (3–4 against WAC opponents) and were outscored by a total of 287 to 257.

Rich Diller, Don Woods, and Don Hubbard were the team captains. The team's statistical leaders included Don Woods with 869 passing yards, 971 rushing yards, and 66 points scored, and Paul Labarrere with 374 receiving yards.

== Schedule ==
| Date | Time | Opponent | Site | Result | Attendance | Source |
|---|---|---|---|---|---|---|
| September 15 | | New Mexico State* | University Stadium; Albuquerque, NM (rivalry) | W 48–6 | 24,145 | |
| September 22 | | at Texas Tech* | Jones Stadium; Lubbock, TX | L 7–41 | 30,218 | |
| September 29 | 1:30 p.m. | at Air Force* | Falcon Stadium; Colorado Springs, CO | L 6–10 | 33,390 | |
| October 6 | | No. 12 Arizona State | University Stadium; Albuquerque, NM | L 24–67 | 21,139 | |
| October 13 | | at Arizona | Arizona Stadium; Tucson, AZ (rivalry) | L 14–22 | 39,582 | |
| October 20 | | UTEP | University Stadium; Albuquerque, NM | W 49–0 | 12,300 | |
| October 27 | 8:30 p.m. | at San Jose State* | Spartan Stadium; San Jose, CA | L 0–15 | 12,503 | |
| November 3 | | at BYU | Cougar Stadium; Provo, UT | L 21–56 | 11,412 | |
| November 10 | | Utah^{†} | University Stadium; Albuquerque, NM | L 35–36 | 10,757 | |
| November 17 | | Wyoming | University Stadium; Albuquerque, NM | W 23–21 | 9,628 | |
| November 24 | | at Colorado State | Hughes Stadium; Fort Collins, CO | W 30–13 | 13,727 | |
*Non-conference game; ^{†}Homecoming; Rankings from AP Poll released prior to the game; All times are in Mountain time
