= Foster Andersen =

American football player and coach (1940–2004)

Biographical details
- Born: March 11, 1940
- Died: April 26, 2004 (aged 64)

Playing career
- 1958–1961: UCLA
- Position: Tackle

Coaching career (HC unless noted)
- 1962: UCLA (GA)
- 1963: Pasadena (assistant)
- 1967: Pasadena (assistant)
- 1968–1969: East Los Angeles (DC)
- 1970: Cal State Los Angeles (assistant)
- 1971–1973: Cal State Los Angeles
- 1974–1976: USC (OL/LB)
- 1977: UCLA (DB)
- 1978–1979: Los Angeles Rams (OL)
- 1980: USC (scout)
- 1981–1986: USC (assistant)
- 1989–1991: Los Angeles Valley (assistant)
- 1995–1997: Cal State Northridge (assistant)
- 1999–2000: Cal State Northridge (assistant)

Head coaching record
- Overall: 9–21–1

Accomplishments and honors

Awards
- Second-team All-PCC (1961)

Foster Andersen (March 11, 1940 – April 26, 2004) was an American football player and coach. An accomplished athlete at UCLA, he was drafted by the Los Angeles Rams in 1962 NFL draft. Andersen embarked on a long coaching tenure in the junior college, college and National Football League (NFL) ranks. He served as the head football coach at Cal State Los Angeles from 1971 to 1973, compiling a record of 9–21–1. He also had coaching stints at University of California, Los Angeles (UCLA), University of Southern California (USC), and with the Los Angeles Rams.

== Head coaching record ==
Year	Team	Overall	Conference	Standing	Bowl/playoffs
Cal State Los Angeles Diablos (Pacific Coast Athletic Association) (1971–1973)
1971	Cal State Los Angeles	2–8	0–3	7th	
1972	Cal State Los Angeles	3–7	0–0	NA	
1973	Cal State Los Angeles	4–6–1	0–0	NA	
Cal State Los Angeles:		9–21–1	0–3		
Total:		9–21–1			
