= 1973 Cal State Hayward Pioneers football team =

American college football season

1973 Cal State Hayward Pioneers football
- Conference: Far Western Conference
- Record: 3–7 (3–2 FWC)
- Head coach: Bob Rodrigo (3rd season)
- Defensive coordinator: Tim Tierney (4th season)
- Home stadium: Pioneer Stadium

1973 Far Western Conference football standings
| | Conf. | | | | | Overall |
| Team | W | | L | | T | W | | L | | T |
|---|---|---|---|---|---|---|---|---|---|---|
| UC Davis + | 4 | – | 1 | – | 0 | 7 | – | 3 | – | 0 |
| Chico State + | 4 | – | 1 | – | 0 | 7 | – | 3 | – | 0 |
| San Francisco State | 3 | – | 2 | – | 0 | 7 | – | 2 | – | 1 |
| Cal State Hayward | 3 | – | 2 | – | 0 | 3 | – | 7 | – | 0 |
| Humboldt State | 1 | – | 4 | – | 0 | 2 | – | 6 | – | 2 |
| Sacramento State | 0 | – | 5 | – | 0 | 1 | – | 9 | – | 0 |
+ – Conference co-champions

The 1973 Cal State Hayward Pioneers football team represented California State University, Hayward—now known as California State University, East Bay—as a member of the Far Western Conference (FWC) during the 1973 NCAA Division II football season. Led by third-year head coach Bob Rodrigo, Cal State Hayward compiled an overall record of 3–7 with a mark of 3–2 in conference play, tying for third place in the FWC. The team was outscored by its opponents 263 to 162 for the season. The Pioneers played home games at Pioneer Stadium in Hayward, California.

== Schedule ==
| Date | Opponent | Site | Result | Attendance | Source |
|---|---|---|---|---|---|
| September 15 | at Idaho State* | ASISU Minidome; Pocatello, ID | L 7–21 | 9,000 | |
| September 22 | Santa Clara* | Pioneer Stadium; Hayward, CA | L 13–28 | 1,500 | |
| September 29 | at Cal State Northridge* | North Campus Stadium; Northridge, CA | L 9–32 | 2,200 | |
| October 6 | at Sacramento State | Hornet Stadium; Sacramento, CA | W 14–6 | 1,000 | |
| October 13 | Humboldt State | Pioneer Stadium; Hayward, CA | W 41–12 | 1,000 | |
| October 20 | UC Davis | Pioneer Stadium; Hayward, CA | W 47–20 | 3,248 | |
| October 27 | at San Francisco State | Cox Stadium; San Francisco, CA | L 7–47 | 3,500 | |
| November 3 | No. 3 Cal Poly* | Pioneer Stadium; Hayward, CA | L 0–58 | 3,200 | |
| November 10 | Chico State | Pioneer Stadium; Hayward, CA | L 6–17 | 1,000 | |
| November 24 | Cal State Fullerton* | Pioneer Stadium; Hayward, CA | L 18–22 | 1,018–1,500 | |
*Non-conference game; Rankings from UPI Poll released prior to the game
