= 1973 South Dakota Coyotes football team =

American college football season

1973 South Dakota Coyotes football

NCC co-champion

NCAA Division II Quarterfinal, L 10–53 at Boise State
- Conference: North Central Conference
- Record: 8–3 (6–1 NCC)
- Head coach: Joe Salem (8th season)
- Home stadium: Inman Field

1973 North Central Conference football standings
| | Conf. | | | | | Overall |
| Team | W | | L | | T | W | | L | | T |
|---|---|---|---|---|---|---|---|---|---|---|
| No. 14 North Dakota State + | 6 | – | 1 | – | 0 | 8 | – | 2 | – | 0 |
| No. 11 South Dakota +^ | 6 | – | 1 | – | 0 | 8 | – | 3 | – | 0 |
| Mankato State | 4 | – | 3 | – | 0 | 7 | – | 4 | – | 0 |
| North Dakota | 4 | – | 3 | – | 0 | 6 | – | 4 | – | 0 |
| Augustana (SD) | 3 | – | 3 | – | 1 | 6 | – | 3 | – | 1 |
| South Dakota State | 2 | – | 4 | – | 1 | 5 | – | 5 | – | 1 |
| Northern Iowa | 2 | – | 5 | – | 0 | 5 | – | 5 | – | 0 |
| Morningside | 0 | – | 7 | – | 0 | 0 | – | 9 | – | 0 |
+ – Conference co-champions; ^ – NCAA Division II playoff participant; Rankings from AP small college poll

The 1973 South Dakota Coyotes football team was an American football team that represented the University of South Dakota as a member of the North Central Conference (NCC) during the 1973 NCAA Division II football season. Led by eighth-year head coach Joe Salem, the Coyotes compiled an overall record of 8–3 with a mark of 6–1 in conference play, sharing the NCC title with North Dakota State. South Dakota advanced to the NCAA Division II Football Championship playoffs, losing to Boise State in the quarterfinals. The team played home games at Inman Field in Vermillion, South Dakota

== Schedule ==
| Date | Opponent | Rank | Site | Result | Attendance | Source |
|---|---|---|---|---|---|---|
| September 1 | Winona State* | | Inman Field; Vermillion, SD | W 77–0 | 6,000 | |
| September 15 | at Tennessee Tech* | | Tucker Stadium; Cookeville, TN | W 30–0 | 7,200 | |
| September 22 | at No. 5 North Dakota State | | Dacotah Field; Fargo, ND | W 9–7 | 10,800 | |
| September 29 | at Northern Iowa | No. 3 | O. R. Latham Stadium; Cedar Falls, IA | W 19–7 | 7,025 | |
| October 6 | at Montana* | No. 3 | Dornblaser Field; Missoula, MT | L 19–31 | 7,100–7,500 | |
| October 13 | Morningside | No. 8 | Inman Field; Vermillion, SD | W 60–7 | 12,250 | |
| October 20 | at South Dakota State | No. 7 | Coughlin–Alumni Stadium; Brookings, SD (rivalry) | W 36–10 | 13,350 | |
| October 27 | Augustana (SD) | No. 6 | Inman Field; Vermillion, SD | W 28–21 | 5,000 | |
| November 3 | North Dakota | No. 5 | Inman Field; Vermillion, SD (Sitting Bull Trophy) | L 21–54 | 5,000 | |
| November 10 | Mankato State | No. 13 | Inman Field; Vermillion, SD | W 38–3 | 3,700 | |
| December 1 | at No. 7 Boise State* | No. 10 | Bronco Stadium; Boise, ID (NCAA Division II Quarterfinal) | L 10–53 | 14,358 | |
*Non-conference game; Rankings from AP Poll released prior to the game
