= 1973 Humboldt State Lumberjacks football team =

American college football season

1973 Humboldt State Lumberjacks football
- Conference: Far Western Conference
- Record: 2–6–2 (1–4 FWC)
- Head coach: Bud Van Deren (8th season)
- Home stadium: Redwood Bowl

1973 Far Western Conference football standings
	Conf.					Overall
Team	W		L		T	W		L		T
UC Davis +	4	–	1	–	0	7	–	3	–	0
Chico State +	4	–	1	–	0	7	–	3	–	0
San Francisco State	3	–	2	–	0	7	–	2	–	1
Cal State Hayward	3	–	2	–	0	3	–	7	–	0
Humboldt State	1	–	4	–	0	2	–	6	–	2
Sacramento State	0	–	5	–	0	1	–	9	–	0
+ – Conference co-champions

The 1973 Humboldt State Lumberjacks football team represented California State University, Humboldt—now known as California State Polytechnic University, Humboldt—as a member of the Far Western Conference (FWC) during the 1973 NCAA Division II football season. Led by eighth-year head coach Bud Van Deren, the Lumberjacks compiled an overall record of 2–6–2 with a mark of 1–4 in conference play, placing fifth in the FWC. The team was outscored by its opponents 212 to 123 for the season. Humboldt State played home games at the Redwood Bowl in Arcata, California.

== Schedule ==
Date	Opponent	Site	Result	Attendance	Source
September 15	at Cal Lutheran*	Mt. Clef Field; Thousand Oaks, CA	L 7–14	2,000	
September 22	Humboldt State alumni*	Redwood Bowl; Arcata, CA	T 6–6	1,800	
September 29	Puget Sound*	Redwood Bowl; Arcata, CA	L 14–48	3,800	
October 6	at Chico State	University Stadium; Chico, CA	L 13–17	1,000	
October 13	at Cal State Hayward	Pioneer Stadium; Hayward, CA	L 12–41	1,000	
October 20	Sacramento State	Redwood Bowl; Arcata, CA	W 7–0	1,200	
October 27	San Diego*	Redwood Bowl; Arcata, CA	T 28–28	2,000–3,500	
November 3	UC Davis	Redwood Bowl; Arcata, CA	L 0–31	5,000–5,200	
November 10	at San Francisco State	Cox Stadium; San Francisco, CA	L 19–21	200–2,000	
November 17	Portland State*	Redwood Bowl; Arcata, CA	W 17–6	300	
*Non-conference game

== Team players in the NFL ==
The following Humboldt State players were selected in the 1974 NFL draft.

Player	Position	Round	Overall	NFL team
Mike Bettiga	Wide receiver	15	382	San Francisco 49ers

The following finished their college career in 1973, were not drafted, but played in the NFL.

Player	Position	First NFL team
R. W. Hicks	Center	1975 Detroit Lions
