= 1973 Wyoming Cowboys football team =

American college football season

1973 Wyoming Cowboys football
- Conference: Western Athletic Conference
- Record: 4–7 (3–4 WAC)
- Head coach: Fritz Shurmur (3rd season)
- Captains: Steve Cockreham; Frank Erzinger; Dan Fedore
- Home stadium: War Memorial Stadium

1973 Western Athletic Conference football standings
	Conf.					Overall
Team	W		L		T	W		L		T
No. 9 Arizona State +	6	–	1	–	0	11	–	1	–	0
Arizona +	6	–	1	–	0	8	–	3	–	0
Utah	4	–	2	–	0	7	–	5	–	0
BYU	3	–	4	–	0	5	–	6	–	0
New Mexico	3	–	4	–	0	4	–	7	–	0
Wyoming	3	–	4	–	0	4	–	7	–	0
Colorado State	2	–	4	–	0	5	–	6	–	0
UTEP	0	–	7	–	0	0	–	11	–	0
+ – Conference co-champions; Rankings from AP Poll

The 1973 Wyoming Cowboys football team represented the University of Wyoming as a member of the Western Athletic Conference (WAC) during the 1973 NCAA Division I football season. Led by third-year head coach Fritz Shurmur, the Cowboys compiled a record of 4–7 (3–4 against conference opponents), placing in a three-way tie for third in the WAC. The team played home games on campus at War Memorial Stadium in Laramie, Wyoming.

== Schedule ==
Date	Time	Opponent	Site	Result	Attendance	Source
September 15		Arizona	War Memorial Stadium; Laramie, WY	L 7–21	19,718	
September 22	1:30 p.m.	Pacific (CA)*	War Memorial Stadium; Laramie, WY	W 49–14	17,095	
September 29		UTEP	War Memorial Stadium; Laramie, WY	W 31–8	17,752	
October 6		at Wisconsin*	Camp Randall Stadium; Madison, WI	L 28–37	60,715	
October 13		at Utah	Robert Rice Stadium; Salt Lake City, UT	L 16–50	30,244	
October 20		Colorado State	War Memorial Stadium; Laramie, WY (rivalry)	W 35–3	19,229	
October 27		BYU	War Memorial Stadium; Laramie, WY	W 41–21	18,746	
November 3		at Utah State*	Romney Stadium; Logan, UT	L 20–31	11,792	
November 10		at No. 14 Arizona State	Sun Devil Stadium; Tempe, AZ	L 0–47	49,880	
November 17		at New Mexico	University Stadium; Albuquerque, NM	L 21–23	9,628	
November 24		at No. 14 Houston*	Houston Astrodome; Houston, TX	L 0–35	18,441	
*Non-conference game; Rankings from AP Poll released prior to the game; All times are in Mountain time
