= 1973 San Francisco State Gators football team =

American college football season

1973 San Francisco State Gators football
- Conference: Far Western Conference
- Record: 7–2–1 (3–2 FWC)
- Head coach: Vic Rowen (13th season)
- Offensive coordinator: Dick Logan (4th season)
- Home stadium: Cox Stadium

1973 Far Western Conference football standings
	Conf.					Overall
Team	W		L		T	W		L		T
UC Davis +	4	–	1	–	0	7	–	3	–	0
Chico State +	4	–	1	–	0	7	–	3	–	0
San Francisco State	3	–	2	–	0	7	–	2	–	1
Cal State Hayward	3	–	2	–	0	3	–	7	–	0
Humboldt State	1	–	4	–	0	2	–	6	–	2
Sacramento State	0	–	5	–	0	1	–	9	–	0
+ – Conference co-champions

The 1973 San Francisco State Gators football team represented California State University, San Francisco—now known as San Francisco State University—as a member of the Far Western Conference (FWC) during the 1973 NCAA Division II football season. Led by 13th-year head coach Vic Rowen, San Francisco State compiled an overall record of 7–2–1 and a conference mark of 3–2, tying for third place in the FWC. For the season, the team outscored its opponents 263 to 188. The Gators played home games at Cox Stadium in San Francisco.

== Schedule ==
Date	Opponent	Site	Result	Attendance	Source
September 8	Nevada*	Cox Stadium; San Francisco, CA	W 31–28	2,500	
September 22	Cal State Northridge*	Cox Stadium; San Francisco, CA	W 35–21	2,800–3,000	
September 29	Cal Lutheran*	Cox Stadium; San Francisco, CA	W 19–14	2,000–3,000	
October 6	Oregon Tech*	Cox Stadium; San Francisco, CA	W 48–9	2,500	
October 13	Saint Mary's*	Cox Stadium; San Francisco, CA	T 14–14	3,500	
October 20	at Chico State	University Stadium; Chico, CA	L 7–31	6,082	
October 27	Cal State Hayward	Cox Stadium; San Francisco, CA	W 47–7	3,500	
November 3	at Sacramento State	Hornet Stadium; Sacramento, CA	W 28–23	4,000	
November 10	Humboldt State	Cox Stadium; San Francisco, CA	W 21–19	200–2,000	
November 17	at UC Davis	Toomey Field; Davis, CA	L 13–22	5,500–6,500	
*Non-conference game
