= 1973 Montana State Bobcats football team =

American college football season

1973 Montana State Bobcats football
- Conference: Big Sky Conference
- Record: 7–4 (5–1 Big Sky)
- Head coach: Sonny Holland (3rd season)
- Offensive coordinator: Don Christensen (3rd season)
- Defensive coordinator: Sonny Lubick (3rd season)
- Home stadium: Sales Stadium

1973 Big Sky Conference football standings
	Conf.					Overall
Team	W		L		T	W		L		T
No. 5 Boise State $^	6	–	0	–	0	10	–	3	–	0
Montana State	5	–	1	–	0	7	–	4	–	0
Idaho	3	–	2	–	0	4	–	7	–	0
Northern Arizona	2	–	3	–	0	4	–	6	–	0
Montana	2	–	4	–	0	4	–	6	–	0
Weber State	2	–	4	–	0	3	–	8	–	0
Idaho State	0	–	6	–	0	2	–	9	–	0
$ – Conference champion; ^ – NCAA Division II playoff participant; Idaho was classified as Division I. All the other teams were classified as Division II.; Rankings from AP small college poll

The 1973 Montana State Bobcats football team was an American football team that represented Montana State University in the Big Sky Conference during the 1973 NCAA Division II football season. In their third season under head coach Sonny Holland, the Bobcats compiled a 7–4 record (5–1 against Big Sky opponents) and finished second in the Big Sky.

The team played its home games in the newly constructed, 10,000-seat Reno H. Sales Stadium in Bozeman, Montana.

== Schedule ==
Date	Opponent	Rank	Site	Result	Attendance	Source
September 8	Idaho State*		Sales Stadium; Bozeman, MT	W 42–7	8,350	
September 15	at North Dakota State*		Dacotah Field; Fargo, ND	L 17–34	6,700–7,100	
September 22	at No. 10 Boise State		Bronco Stadium; Boise, ID	L 17–27	14,521	
September 29	Fresno State*		Sales Stadium; Bozeman, MT	W 38–6	9,253–9,257	
October 6	at Idaho State		ASISU Minidome; Pocatello, ID	W 43–21	11,000	
October 13	Weber State^{†}		Sales Stadium; Bozeman, MT	W 33–0	9,837	
October 20	Montana		Sales Stadium; Bozeman, MT (rivalry)	W 33–7	12,335	
October 27	at Idaho		Idaho Stadium; Moscow, ID	W 35–14	7,068	
November 3	at Northern Arizona		Lumberjack Stadium; Flagstaff, AZ	W 45–0	3,100	
November 10	North Dakota*	No. 15	Sales Stadium; Bozeman, MT	L 30–41	5,600	
November 17	at Santa Clara*		Buck Shaw Stadium; Santa Clara, CA	L 6–10	4,220	
*Non-conference game; ^{†}Homecoming; Rankings from AP Poll released prior to the game
