= 1973 Idaho State Bengals football team =

American college football season

1973 Idaho State Bengals football
- Conference: Big Sky Conference
- Record: 2–9 (0–6 Big Sky)
- Head coach: Bob Griffin (2nd season)
- Home stadium: ASISU Minidome

1973 Big Sky Conference football standings
	Conf.					Overall
Team	W		L		T	W		L		T
No. 5 Boise State $^	6	–	0	–	0	10	–	3	–	0
Montana State	5	–	1	–	0	7	–	4	–	0
Idaho	3	–	2	–	0	4	–	7	–	0
Northern Arizona	2	–	3	–	0	4	–	6	–	0
Montana	2	–	4	–	0	4	–	6	–	0
Weber State	2	–	4	–	0	3	–	8	–	0
Idaho State	0	–	6	–	0	2	–	9	–	0
$ – Conference champion; ^ – NCAA Division II playoff participant; Idaho was classified as Division I. All the other teams were classified as Division II.; Rankings from AP small college poll

The 1973 Idaho State Bengals football team represented Idaho State University as a member of the Big Sky Conference during the 1973 NCAA Division II football season. Led by second-year head coach Bob Griffin, the Bengals compiled an overall record of 2–9, with a mark of 0–6 in conference play, and finished seventh in the Big Sky.

== Schedule ==
Date	Opponent	Site	Result	Attendance	Source
September 8	at Montana State*	Sales Stadium; Bozeman, MT	L 7–42	8,350	
September 15	Cal State Hayward*	ASISU Minidome; Pocatello, ID	W 21–7	9,000	
September 22	at No. 8 Cal Poly*	Mustang Stadium; San Luis Obispo, CA	L 10–20	6,929	
September 29	at Nevada*	Mackay Stadium; Reno, NV	L 14–38	5,000	
October 6	Montana State	ASISU Minidome; Pocatello, ID	L 21–43	11,000	
October 13	at Montana	Dornblaser Field; Missoula, MT	L 14–19	7,500	
October 27	Weber State	ASISU Minidome; Pocatello, ID	L 23–38	9,000	
November 3	at Portland State*	Civic Stadium; Portland, OR	W 21–13	897	
November 10	No. 11 Boise State	ASISU Minidome; Pocatello, ID	L 17–21	12,000	
November 17	at Idaho	Idaho Stadium; Moscow, ID (rivalry)	L 0–43	6,879	
November 22	Northern Arizona	ASISU Minidome; Pocatello, ID	L 7–35	5,300	
*Non-conference game; Rankings from AP Poll released prior to the game
