= 1973 Montana Grizzlies football team =

American college football season

1973 Montana Grizzlies football
- Conference: Big Sky Conference
- Record: 4–6 (2–4 Big Sky)
- Head coach: Jack Swarthout (7th season)
- Home stadium: Dornblaser Field

1973 Big Sky Conference football standings
	Conf.					Overall
Team	W		L		T	W		L		T
No. 5 Boise State $^	6	–	0	–	0	10	–	3	–	0
Montana State	5	–	1	–	0	7	–	4	–	0
Idaho	3	–	2	–	0	4	–	7	–	0
Northern Arizona	2	–	3	–	0	4	–	6	–	0
Montana	2	–	4	–	0	4	–	6	–	0
Weber State	2	–	4	–	0	3	–	8	–	0
Idaho State	0	–	6	–	0	2	–	9	–	0
$ – Conference champion; ^ – NCAA Division II playoff participant; Idaho was classified as Division I. All the other teams were classified as Division II.; Rankings from AP small college poll

The 1973 Montana Grizzlies football team was an American football team that represented the University of Montana in the Big Sky Conference during the 1973 NCAA Division II football season. In their seventh year under head coach Jack Swarthout, the team compiled an 4–6 record.

== Schedule ==
Date	Opponent	Site	Result	Attendance	Source
September 8	Simon Fraser*	Memorial Stadium; Great Falls, MT	W 41–14	4,200	
September 15	at North Dakota*	Memorial Stadium; Grand Forks, ND	L 10–31	8,000	
September 22	at Rice*	Rice Stadium; Houston, TX	L 10–21	18,000	
September 29	at Northern Arizona	Lumberjack Stadium; Flagstaff, AZ	L 10–14	8,500	
October 6	No. 3 South Dakota*	Dornblaser Field; Missoula, MT	W 31–19	7,100–7,500	
October 13	Idaho State	Dornblaser Field; Missoula, MT	W 19–14	7,500	
October 20	at Montana State	Reno H. Sales Stadium; Bozeman, MT (rivalry)	L 7–33	11,000	
October 27	at No. 11 Boise State	Bronco Stadium; Boise, ID	L 7–55	12,852	
November 3	Idaho	Dornblaser Field; Missoula, MT (Little Brown Stein)	L 7–20	4,300	
November 10	at Weber State	Wildcat Stadium; Ogden, UT	W 10–0	7,389	
*Non-conference game; Rankings from AP Poll released prior to the game
