= 1973 Arizona Wildcats football team =

American college football season

1973 Arizona Wildcats football

WAC co-champion
- Conference: Western Athletic Conference
- Record: 8–3 (6–1 WAC)
- Head coach: Jim Young (1st season)
- Offensive coordinator: John Mackovic (1st season)
- Defensive coordinator: Larry Smith (1st season)
- Captains: Ransom Terrell; James O'Connor; Mark Neal
- Home stadium: Arizona Stadium

1973 Western Athletic Conference football standings
	Conf.					Overall
Team	W		L		T	W		L		T
No. 9 Arizona State +	6	–	1	–	0	11	–	1	–	0
Arizona +	6	–	1	–	0	8	–	3	–	0
Utah	4	–	2	–	0	7	–	5	–	0
BYU	3	–	4	–	0	5	–	6	–	0
New Mexico	3	–	4	–	0	4	–	7	–	0
Wyoming	3	–	4	–	0	4	–	7	–	0
Colorado State	2	–	4	–	0	5	–	6	–	0
UTEP	0	–	7	–	0	0	–	11	–	0
+ – Conference co-champions; Rankings from AP Poll

The 1973 Arizona Wildcats football team represented the University of Arizona as a member of the Western Athletic Conference (WAC) during the 1973 NCAA Division I football season. Led by first-year head coach Jim Young, the Wildcats compiled an overall record of 8–3 with a mark of 6–1 in conference play, sharing the WAC title rival Arizona State. The Sun Devils won the head-to-head matchup to clinch the conference's bowl bid, and Arizona was left out of the postseason.

Young was brought in by Arizona to replace Bob Weber, who was fired after the 1972 season. The Wildcats believed that Young would rebuild the team and to return them to their winning ways.

== Schedule ==
Date	Time	Opponent	Rank	Site	TV	Result	Attendance	Source
September 8		at Colorado State		Hughes Stadium; Fort Collins, CO		W 31–0	17,217	
September 15		at Wyoming		War Memorial Stadium; Laramie, WY		W 21–7	19,718	
September 22		Indiana*		Arizona Stadium; Tucson, AZ		W 26–10	38,643	
October 6		at Iowa*		Kinnick Stadium; Iowa City, IA		W 23–20	40,365	
October 13		New Mexico		Arizona Stadium; Tucson, AZ (rivalry)		W 22–14	39,582	
October 20		Texas Tech*	No. 19	Arizona Stadium; Tucson, AZ		L 17–31	40,172	
October 27		Utah		Arizona Stadium; Tucson, AZ	ABC	W 42–21	34,219	
November 3		at UTEP		Sun Bowl; El Paso, TX		W 35–18	6,940	
November 10		at BYU		Cougar Stadium; Provo, UT		W 24–10	19,597	
November 17	2:30 p.m.	Air Force*	No. 19	Arizona Stadium; Tucson, AZ		L 26–27	39,733	
November 24		at No. 13 Arizona State		Sun Devil Stadium; Tempe, AZ (rivalry)		L 19–55	51,383	
*Non-conference game; Rankings from AP Poll released prior to the game; All times are in Mountain time

== Personnel ==
=== Coaching staff ===
- Head coach: Jim Young
- Offensive coaches: Bill Belknap, Bob Bockrath, John Mackovic, Willie Peete
- Defensive coaches: Mike Hankwitz, Sharkey Price (DL), Tom Reed, Larry Smith

=== Roster ===
1973 Arizona Wildcats football team roster
Players
Coaches
Offense

Pos.	#	Name	Class
WR	18	Theo Bell	So
WR	23	Keith Hartwig	So

Defense

Pos.	#	Name	Class
DE	57	Wally Brumfield	Sr
DT	77	Mike Dawson	So
LB	61	Obra Erby	Fr

Special teams

Pos.	#	Name	Class
P	32	Mitch Hoopes	So

Head coach

- Jim Young

Coordinators/assistant coaches

Legend

- (C) Team captain
- (S) Suspended
- (I) Ineligible
- Injured
- Redshirt

- Bill Adamson, mg
- Dennis Anderson, s
- Mike Battles, s
- Jay Bledsoe, og
- Charlie Gorham, k
- Glen Gresham, lb
- Rich Hall, dt
- Willie Hamilton, rb
- Allyn Haynes, og
- Bruce Hill, qb
- Dan Howard, te
- Leon Lawrence, db
- Rex Naumetz, de
- Brian Murray, ot
- Mark Neal, wr
- Jim O'Connor, ot
- Vince Phason, cb
- Ransom Terrell, lb
- Jim Upchurch, rb
- Bruce Walker, dt
- Roussell Williams, cb
- Bob Windisch, c

== Statistics ==
=== Passing ===
Player	Comp	Att	Yards	TD	INT
Bruce Hill	104	216	1,529	9	9

=== Rushing ===
Player	Att	Yards	TD
Jim Upchurch	210	1,184	10

=== Receiving ===
Player	Rec	Yards	TD
Theo Bell	47	790	7

== Awards ==
All-WAC (1st Team)

- Jim O'Connor (OT)
- Willie Hamilton (RB)
- Roussell Williams (CB)
- Ransom Terrell (LB)
- Wally Brumfield (DE)

All-WAC (Second Team)

- Jay Bledsoe (OG)
- Bob Windisch (C)
- T Bell (WR)
- Jim Upchurch (RB)
- Mike Dawson (DT)
- Glen Gresham (LB)
- Mike Battles (FS)
- Leon Lawrence (SS)
- Charlie Gorham (K)
- Mitch Hoopes (P)

WAC Rookie of the Year: Bruce Hill

WAC Coach of the Year: Jim Young

== Season notes ==
- Despite sharing the WAC title, Arizona did not earn a bowl invitation due to its loss to Arizona State and a lack of bowl spots available at the time. The head-to-head loss to ASU was a major reason behind the Wildcats being uninvited for a bowl. Had they beaten ASU and won the WAC outright, the Wildcats would have earned a spot in the Fiesta Bowl.
- Three of Arizona’s coaching staff would become future Wildcat head coaches. Larry Smith (defensive coordinator) would have a successful tenure with the Wildcats that began in 1980, and John Mackovic (offensive coordinator) was hired in 2001 and his Wildcat tenure would turn out to be a failure. A third coach, Mike Hankwitz, replaced Mackovic as Arizona’s coach during a disastrous 2003 season.
- Many Wildcats fans as well as the Tucson community credited Young for turning the program around after his predecessor’s failed tenure with the team. Young would be awarded the WAC coach of the year for his efforts.
