= 1973 Cal State Northridge Matadors football team =

American college football season

1973 Cal State Northridge Matadors football
- Conference: California Collegiate Athletic Association
- Record: 2–9 (1–3 CCAA)
- Head coach: Gary Torgeson (1st season)
- Home stadium: North Campus Stadium

1973 California Collegiate Athletic Association football standings
	Conf.					Overall
Team	W		L		T	W		L		T
No. 8/9 Cal Poly $	4	–	0	–	0	9	–	1	–	0
UC Riverside	3	–	1	–	0	8	–	2	–	0
Cal State Fullerton	1	–	3	–	0	7	–	4	–	0
Cal Poly Pomona	1	–	3	–	0	4	–	6	–	1
Cal State Northridge	1	–	3	–	0	2	–	9	–	0
$ – Conference champion; Rankings from AP/UPI small college polls

The 1973 Cal State Northridge Matadors football team represented California State University, Northridge as a member of the California Collegiate Athletic Association (CCAA) during the 1973 NCAA Division II football season. Led by first-year head coach Gary Torgeson, Cal State Northridge compiled an overall record of 2–9 with a mark of 1–3 in conference play, placing in a three-way tie for third in the CCAA. The team was outscored by its opponents 456 to 200 for the season and allowed over 50 points four times. The Matadors played home games at North Campus Stadium in Northridge, California.

== Schedule ==
Date	Time	Opponent	Site	Result	Attendance	Source
September 15		Cal Poly	North Campus Stadium; Northridge, CA	L 20–65	3,300	
September 22		at San Francisco State*	Cox Stadium; San Francisco, CA	L 21–35	2,800–3,000	
September 29		Cal State Hayward*	North Campus Stadium; Northridge, CA	W 32–9	2,200	
October 6		UC Riverside	North Campus Stadium; Northridge, CA	L 20–28	2,000	
October 13		at Cal State Fullerton	Santa Ana Stadium; Santa Ana, CA	L 18–42	2,033	
October 20		Nevada*	North Campus Stadium; Northridge, CA	L 0–48	1,000–2,000	
October 27		at Northern Arizona*	Lumberjack Stadium; Flagstaff, AZ	L 17–77	7,800	
November 3		at Hawaii*	Honolulu Stadium; Honolulu, HI	L 3–28	19,281–23,000	
November 10		Cal Poly Pomona	North Campus Stadium; Northridge, CA	W 20–7	1,500–2,400	
November 17		at Cal State Los Angeles*	Campus Field; Los Angeles, CA	L 22–63	500–1,200	
November 24	1:35 p.m.	at Fresno State*	Ratcliffe Stadium; Fresno, CA	L 27–54	3,941–9,000	
*Non-conference game; All times are in Pacific time
