= 1973 Pacific Tigers football team =

American college football season

1973 Pacific Tigers football
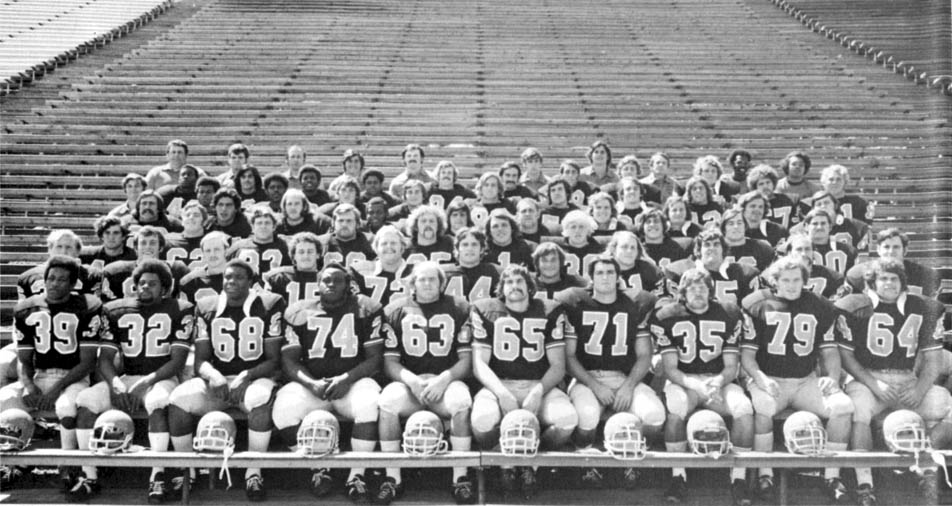
- Conference: Pacific Coast Athletic Association
- Record: 7–2–1 (2–1–1 PCAA)
- Head coach: Chester Caddas (2nd season)
- Home stadium: Pacific Memorial Stadium

1973 Pacific Coast Athletic Association football standings
	Conf.					Overall
Team	W		L		T	W		L		T
San Diego State $	3	–	0	–	1	9	–	1	–	1
San Jose State	2	–	0	–	2	5	–	4	–	2
Pacific (CA)	2	–	1	–	1	7	–	2	–	1
Fresno State	1	–	3	–	0	2	–	9	–	0
Long Beach State	0	–	4	–	0	1	–	9	–	1
$ – Conference champion

The 1973 Pacific Tigers football team represented the University of the Pacific (UOP) as a member of the Pacific Coast Athletic Association (PCAA) during the 1973 NCAA Division I football season. Led by second-year head coach Chester Caddas, the Tigers compiled an overall record of 7–2–1 with a mark of 2–1–1 in conference play, placing third in the PCAA, and outscored opponents 279 to 109. The team played home games at Pacific Memorial Stadium in Stockton, California.

== Schedule ==
Date	Time	Opponent	Site	Result	Attendance	Source
September 8	7:30 p.m.	Sacramento State*	Pacific Memorial Stadium; Stockton, CA	W 22–0	15,230–15,273	
September 15		at UTEP*	Sun Bowl; El Paso, TX	W 34–9	13,670	
September 22	12:30 p.m.	at Wyoming*	War Memorial Stadium; Laramie, WY	L 14–49	17,095	
October 6	7:30 p.m.	at San Jose State	Spartan Stadium; San Jose, CA (Victory Bell)	T 21–21	14,526	
October 13	7:30 p.m.	Long Beach State	Pacific Memorial Stadium; Stockton, CA	W 10–6	12,484	
October 20	7:30 p.m.	San Diego State	Pacific Memorial Stadium; Stockton, CA	L 10–13	14,783–14,785	
October 27	2:00 p.m.	Santa Clara*^{†}	Pacific Memorial Stadium; Stockton, CA	W 44–6	13,562	
November 3	1:30 p.m.	Cal State Los Angeles*	Pacific Memorial Stadium; Stockton, CA	W 54–2	5,884	
November 10	1:30 p.m.	Fresno State	Pacific Memorial Stadium; Stockton, CA	W 42–0	4,108	
November 17	10:30 p.m.	at Hawaii*	Honolulu Stadium; Honolulu, HI	W 28–3	23,206	
*Non-conference game; ^{†}Homecoming; All times are in Pacific time

== Team players in the NFL ==
The following UOP players were selected in the 1974 NFL draft.

Player	Position	Round	Overall	NFL team
Larry Bailey	Defensive tackle	9	225	Atlanta Falcons
