= 1973 UC Riverside Highlanders football team =

American college football season

1973 UC Riverside Highlanders football
- Conference: California Collegiate Athletic Association
- Record: 8–2 (3–1 CCAA)
- Head coach: Wayne Howard (2nd season)
- Offensive coordinator: Ron McBride (2nd season)
- Defensive coordinator: Tom Gadd (2nd season)
- Home stadium: Highlander Stadium

1973 California Collegiate Athletic Association football standings
	Conf.					Overall
Team	W		L		T	W		L		T
No. 8/9 Cal Poly $	4	–	0	–	0	9	–	1	–	0
UC Riverside	3	–	1	–	0	8	–	2	–	0
Cal State Fullerton	1	–	3	–	0	7	–	4	–	0
Cal Poly Pomona	1	–	3	–	0	4	–	6	–	1
Cal State Northridge	1	–	3	–	0	2	–	9	–	0
$ – Conference champion; Rankings from AP/UPI small college polls

The 1973 UC Riverside Highlanders football team represented the University of California, Riverside as a member of the California Collegiate Athletic Association (CCAA) during the 1973 NCAA Division II football season. Led by Wayne Howard in his second and final season as head coach, UC Riverside compiled an overall record of 8–2 with a mark of record of 3–1 in conference play, placing second in the CCAA. The team outscored by its opponents 317 to 172 for the season. The Highlanders played home games at Highlander Stadium in Riverside, California.

Howard finished his tenure at UC Riverside with an overall record of 17–3, for a .850 winning percentage.

== Schedule ==
Date	Time	Opponent	Site	Result	Attendance	Source
September 15		at San Diego*	Torero Stadium; San Diego, CA	W 20–16		
September 22		at UC Davis*	Toomey Field; Davis, CA	L 3–28	6,400	
September 29		Cal Poly	Highlander Stadium; Riverside, CA	L 17–26	3,500	
October 6		at Cal State Northridge	Devonshire Downs; Northridge, CA	W 28–20	2,000	
October 13		Redlands*	Highlander Stadium; Riverside, CA	W 37–0		
October 20		Cal Poly Pomona	Highlander Stadium; Riverside, CA	W 45–14	4,000	
October 27	7:30 p.m.	at Long Beach State*	Veterans Stadium; Long Beach, CA	W 33–16	1,417	
November 3		at Cal State Fullerton	Santa Ana Stadium; Santa Ana, CA	W 20–10	3,619	
November 10		at Cal State Los Angeles*	Campus Field; Los Angeles, CA	W 38–14	1,200	
November 17		United States International*	Highlander Stadium; Riverside, CA	W 76–28		
*Non-conference game; All times are in Pacific time

== Team players in the NFL ==
The following UC Riverside players were selected in the 1974 NFL draft.

Player	Position	Round	Overall	NFL team
Frank Johnson	Tackle	4	102	Los Angeles Rams
Derek Williams	Defensive back	9	221	Los Angeles Rams

The following finished their college career in 1973, were not drafted, but played in the NFL.

Player	Position	First NFL team
Michael Basinger	Defensive end	1974 Green Bay Packers
