= 1973 Fresno State Bulldogs football team =

American college football season

1973 Fresno State Bulldogs football
- Conference: Pacific Coast Athletic Association
- Record: 2–9 (1–3 CCAA)
- Head coach: J. R. Boone (1st season)
- Home stadium: Ratcliffe Stadium

1973 Pacific Coast Athletic Association football standings
	Conf.					Overall
Team	W		L		T	W		L		T
San Diego State $	3	–	0	–	1	9	–	1	–	1
San Jose State	2	–	0	–	2	5	–	4	–	2
Pacific (CA)	2	–	1	–	1	7	–	2	–	1
Fresno State	1	–	3	–	0	2	–	9	–	0
Long Beach State	0	–	4	–	0	1	–	9	–	1
$ – Conference champion

The 1973 Fresno State Bulldogs football team represented California State University, Fresno as a member of the Pacific Coast Athletic Association (PCAA) during the 1973 NCAA Division I football season. Led by first-year head coach J. R. Boone, Fresno State compiled an overall record of 2–9 with a mark of 1–3 in conference play, placing fourth in the PCAA. The Bulldogs played their home games at Ratcliffe Stadium on the campus of Fresno City College in Fresno, California.

== Schedule ==
Date	Time	Opponent	Site	Result	Attendance	Source
September 8		Cal Poly Pomona*	Ratcliffe Stadium; Fresno, CA	L 9–17	10,000	
September 15		San Jose State	Ratcliffe Stadium; Fresno, CA (rivalry)	L 6–24	3,534	
September 22	7:31 p.m.	No. T–11 Hawaii*	Ratcliffe Stadium; Fresno, CA (rivalry)	L 10–13	8,686	
September 29		at Montana State*	Reno H. Sales Stadium; Bozeman, MT	L 6–38	9,253–9,257	
October 6	7:36 p.m.	Northern Illinois*	Ratcliffe Stadium; Fresno, CA	L 15–24	6,272	
October 13	5:30 p.m.	at Wichita State*	Cessna Stadium; Wichita, KS	L 13–18	11,931–11,951	
October 19	8:00 p.m.	at Long Beach State	Veterans Stadium; Long Beach, CA	W 15–14	2,916	
October 27		at No. 4 Cal Poly*	Mustang Stadium; San Luis Obispo, CA	L 14–28	7,459	
November 10	1:30 p.m.	at Pacific (CA)	Pacific Memorial Stadium; Stockton, CA	L 0–42	4,108	
November 17		San Diego State	Ratcliffe Stadium; Fresno, CA (rivalry)	L 6–41	6,419	
November 24	1:35 p.m.	Cal State Northridge*	Ratcliffe Stadium; Fresno, CA	W 54–24	2,619	
*Non-conference game; Rankings from AP Poll released prior to the game; All times are in Pacific time
