= 1973 San Jose State Spartans football team =

American college football season

1973 San Jose State Spartans football
- Conference: Pacific Coast Athletic Association
- Record: 5–4–2 (2–0–2 PCAA)
- Head coach: Darryl Rogers (1st season)
- Defensive coordinator: Bob Padilla (1st season)
- Home stadium: Spartan Stadium

1973 Pacific Coast Athletic Association football standings
	Conf.					Overall
Team	W		L		T	W		L		T
San Diego State $	3	–	0	–	1	9	–	1	–	1
San Jose State	2	–	0	–	2	5	–	4	–	2
Pacific (CA)	2	–	1	–	1	7	–	2	–	1
Fresno State	1	–	3	–	0	2	–	9	–	0
Long Beach State	0	–	4	–	0	1	–	9	–	1
$ – Conference champion

The 1973 San Jose State Spartans football team represented California State University, San Jose (Note: San Jose State University was known as California State University, San Jose from 1972 to 1973.) during the 1973 NCAA Division I football season as a member of the Pacific Coast Athletic Association. (Note: The Big West Conference was known as the Pacific Coast Athletic Association from its founding in 1969 through 1987.) The team was led by first year head coach Darryl Rogers. They played home games at Spartan Stadium in San Jose, California. The Spartans finished the season with a record of five wins, four losses and two ties (5–4–2, 2–0–2 PCAA).

== Schedule ==
Date	Time	Opponent	Site	Result	Attendance	Source
September 8	7:35 p.m.	Santa Clara*	Spartan Stadium; San Jose, CA	W 14–12	18,500	
September 15		at Fresno State	Ratcliffe Stadium; Fresno, CA (rivalry)	W 24–6	3,534	
September 21	8:00 p.m.	at Long Beach State	Veterans Stadium; Long Beach, CA	W 24–6	3,106	
September 29	1:30 p.m.	at Stanford*	Stanford Stadium; Stanford, CA (rivalry)	L 12–23	47,500	
October 6	7:30 p.m.	Pacific (CA)	Spartan Stadium; San Jose, CA (Victory Bell)	T 21–21	14,526	
October 13	6:30 p.m.	at No. 11 Arizona State*	Sun Devil Stadium; Tempe, AZ	L 3–28	50,827	
October 20	7:30 p.m.	Utah*	Spartan Stadium; San Jose, CA	L 21–28	12,100–12,500	
October 27	7:30 p.m.	New Mexico*	Spartan Stadium; San Jose, CA	W 15–0	12,503	
November 3	7:30 p.m.	San Diego State^{†}	Spartan Stadium; San Jose, CA	T 27–27	18,501	
November 10	1:33 p.m.	at California*	California Memorial Stadium; Berkeley, CA	L 9–19	12,000	
November 24	11:03 p.m.	at No. 11 (small) Hawaii*	Honolulu Stadium; Honolulu, HI (rivalry)	W 23–3	20,777	
*Non-conference game; ^{†}Homecoming; Rankings from AP Poll released prior to the game; All times are in Pacific time

== Team players in the NFL ==
The following were selected in the 1974 NFL draft.

Player	Position	Round	Overall	NFL team
Emanuel Armstrong	Linebacker	13	324	Green Bay Packers
Charles DeJurnett	Nose tackle – Defensive tackle	17	418	San Diego Chargers
