= 1973 Long Beach State 49ers football team =

American college football season

1973 Long Beach State 49ers football
- Conference: Pacific Coast Athletic Association
- Record: 1–9–1 (0–4 PCAA)
- Head coach: Jim Stangeland (5th season)
- Home stadium: Veterans Stadium

1973 Pacific Coast Athletic Association football standings
	Conf.					Overall
Team	W		L		T	W		L		T
San Diego State $	3	–	0	–	1	9	–	1	–	1
San Jose State	2	–	0	–	2	5	–	4	–	2
Pacific (CA)	2	–	1	–	1	7	–	2	–	1
Fresno State	1	–	3	–	0	2	–	9	–	0
Long Beach State	0	–	4	–	0	1	–	9	–	1
$ – Conference champion

The 1973 Long Beach State 49ers football team represented California State University, Long Beach (Note: The official name of Long Beach State has been California State University, Long Beach since 1972. However, it is still commonly known as Long Beach State.) during the 1973 NCAA Division I football season.

Cal State Long Beach competed in the Pacific Coast Athletic Association. (Note: The Big West Conference was known as the Pacific Coast Athletic Association from its founding in 1969 through 1987.) The team was led by fifth year head coach Jim Stangeland, and played the majority of their home games at Veterans Stadium adjacent to the campus of Long Beach City College in Long Beach, California. One game was played at the Los Angeles Memorial Coliseum in Los Angeles. They finished the season with a record of one win, nine losses and one tie (1–9–1, 0–4 PCAA).

== Schedule ==
Date	Time	Opponent	Site	Result	Attendance	Source
September 8		Grambling*	Los Angeles Memorial Coliseum; Los Angeles, CA	L 16–29	30,884	
September 15	10:30 a.m.	at Western Michigan*	Waldo Stadium; Kalamazoo, MI	L 8–13	20,050–20,700	
September 21	8:00 p.m.	San Jose State	Veterans Memorial Stadium; Long Beach, CA	L 6–24	3,106	
September 29	5:33 p.m.	at North Texas State*	Fouts Field; Denton, TX	T 0–0	10,378	
October 4	8:05 p.m.	at Cal State Fullerton*	Anaheim Stadium; Anaheim, CA	L 14–17	6,411	
October 13	7:30 p.m.	at Pacific (CA)	Pacific Memorial Stadium; Stockton, CA	L 6–10	12,484	
October 19	8:00 p.m.	Fresno State	Veterans Memorial Stadium; Long Beach, CA	L 14–15	2,916	
October 27	7:30 p.m.	UC Riverside*	Veterans Memorial Stadium; Long Beach, CA	L 16–33	1,417	
November 10	7:30 p.m.	at San Diego State	San Diego Stadium; San Diego, CA	L 2–17	26,961	
November 17	11:30 a.m.	at Wichita State*	Cessna Stadium; Wichita, KS	W 35–10	7,863	
November 24	1:00 p.m.	at No. 10 Cal Poly*	Mustang Stadium; San Luis Obispo, CA	L 7–31	3,086	
*Non-conference game; Rankings from UPI Poll released prior to the game; All times are in Pacific time

== Team players in the NFL ==
The following were selected in the 1974 NFL draft.

Player	Position	Round	Overall	NFL team
Greg Bailey	Defensive back	14	341	San Diego Chargers
Leonard Gray	Tight end	15	372	San Francisco 49ers
