= 1973 Utah Utes football team =

American college football season

1973 Utah Utes football
- Conference: Western Athletic Conference
- Record: 7–5 (4–2 WAC)
- Head coach: Bill Meek (6th season)
- Defensive coordinator: Jim LaRue (6th season)
- Home stadium: Robert Rice Stadium

1973 Western Athletic Conference football standings
	Conf.					Overall
Team	W		L		T	W		L		T
No. 9 Arizona State +	6	–	1	–	0	11	–	1	–	0
Arizona +	6	–	1	–	0	8	–	3	–	0
Utah	4	–	2	–	0	7	–	5	–	0
BYU	3	–	4	–	0	5	–	6	–	0
New Mexico	3	–	4	–	0	4	–	7	–	0
Wyoming	3	–	4	–	0	4	–	7	–	0
Colorado State	2	–	4	–	0	5	–	6	–	0
UTEP	0	–	7	–	0	0	–	11	–	0
+ – Conference co-champions; Rankings from AP Poll

The 1973 Utah Utes football team was an American football team that represented the University of Utah as a member of the Western Athletic Conference (WAC) during the 1973 NCAA Division I football season. In their sixth and final season under head coach Bill Meek, the Utes compiled an overall record of 7–5 with a mark of 4–2 against conference opponents, placing third in the WAC. Home games were played on campus at Robert Rice Stadium in Salt Lake City.

Five weeks after the season ended, in early 1974, Meek resigned. Defensive line coach Tom Lovat, a 35-year-old alumnus from Bingham, was retained for the interim for recruiting continuation and was promoted later that month.

== Schedule ==
Date	Time	Opponent	Site	Result	Attendance	Source
September 15		at No. 20 Texas Tech*	Jones Stadium; Lubbock, TX	L 22–29	38,554	
September 22		UTEP	Robert Rice Stadium; Salt Lake City, UT	W 82–6	27,103	
September 29		at Oregon*	Autzen Stadium; Eugene, OR	W 35–17	31,500	
October 6		at No. 16 UCLA*	Los Angeles Memorial Coliseum; Los Angeles, CA	L 16–66	32,697	
October 13		Wyoming	Robert Rice Stadium; Salt Lake City, UT	W 50–16	30,244	
October 20	8:30 p.m.	at San Jose State*	Spartan Stadium; San Jose, CA	W 28–21	12,100–12,500	
October 27		at Arizona	Arizona Stadium; Tucson, AZ	L 21–42	34,219	
November 3		No. 8 Arizona State^{†}	Robert Rice Stadium; Salt Lake City, UT	W 36–31	22,135	
November 10		at New Mexico	University Stadium; [Albuquerque, NM	W 36–35	10,757	
November 17		Utah State*	Robert Rice Stadium; Salt Lake City, UT (rivalry)	W 31–28	27,842	
November 24		BYU	Robert Rice Stadium; Salt Lake City, UT (rivalry)	L 22–46	18,243	
December 1		at No. 11 (small) Hawaii*	Honolulu Stadium; Honolulu, HI	L 6–7	15,662	
*Non-conference game; ^{†}Homecoming; Rankings from AP Poll released prior to the game; All times are in Mountain time

== Roster ==
1973 Utah Utes football team roster
Players
Coaches
Offense

Pos.	#	Name	Class
TE	45	Willie Armstead	Jr
OT	71	Dave Dahl	Jr
C	55	Doug Duckworth	Jr
FL	25	Steve Odom	Sr
QB	13	Lou Onofrio	So
RB	22	Ike Spencer	Jr
QB	19	Don Van Galder	Sr

Defense

Pos.	#	Name	Class
LB	41	Brad Duckworth	So
LB	58	John Huddleston	So
DT	72	Gary Keller	Sr
DB	12	Ed Onofrio	Sr
DE	93	Scott Reed	Jr
DT	79	Ron Rydalch	Sr
LB	92	Dennis Wall	Jr

Special teams

Pos.	#	Name	Class
K	21	Dan Marrelli	Jr

Head coach

- Bill Meek (6th year)

Coordinators/assistant coaches

- Jim LaRue (DC)
- Gene Dahlquist
- Tom Lovat
- Jeff Fries
- Dale Johnson

Legend

- (C) Team captain
- (S) Suspended
- (I) Ineligible
- Injured
- Redshirt

== NFL draft ==
Four Utes were selected in the 1974 NFL draft, which lasted 17 rounds (442 selections).

Player	Position	Round	Pick	NFL team
Steve Odom	Wide receiver	5	116	Green Bay Packers
Ron Rydalch	Defensive tackle	8	197	New York Jets
Gary Keller	Defensive tackle	13	337	Minnesota Vikings
Don Van Galder	Quarterback	14	361	Washington Redskins
