= Doug Gerhart =

American football player and coach (born 1936)

Biographical details
- Born: November 23, 1936 (age 89); Los Angeles, California, U.S.

Playing career
- 1955–1958: Occidental
- Position: Quarterback

Coaching career (HC unless noted)
- 1959–1961: North Hollywood HS (CA) (assistant)
- 1962–1964: North Hollywood HS (CA)
- 1965–1966: Occidental (backfield)
- 1967–1969: Occidental
- 1970: Princeton (offensive backs)
- 1971–1972: Tulsa (offensive backs)
- 1973–1974: Colorado State (OC)
- 1975: Cleveland Browns (WR)
- 1976–1977: San Francisco 49ers (WR/RB)
- 1978: Detroit Lions (administrative assistant)
- 1979: Chicago Bears (WR)

Head coaching record
- Overall: 8–17–1 (college)

Douglas Arthur Gerhart (born November 23, 1936) is an American former football coach and player. He served as head football coach at Occidental College from 1967 to 1969, compiling a record of 8–17–1. Gerhart was the offensive coordinator at Colorado State University from 1973 to 1974. He worked as an assistant coach for several teams in the National Football League (NFL) between 1975 and 1979: the Cleveland Browns, San Francisco 49ers, Detroit Lions, and Chicago Bears.

== Head coaching record ==
=== College ===
Year	Team	Overall	Conference	Standing	Bowl/playoffs
Occidental Tigers (Southern California Intercollegiate Athletic Conference) (1967–1969)
1967	Occidental	5–4	3–2	T–2nd	
1968	Occidental	3–5–1	3–1–1	2nd	
1969	Occidental	1–8	1–4	5th	
Occidental:		8–17–1	7–7–1		
Total:		8–17–1			
