= Keith Denson =

American football player (born 1952)

No. 84
- Position: Wide receiver

Personal information
- Born: August 30, 1952 (age 74); Camp Lejeune, North Carolina, U.S.
- Listed height: 5 ft 8 in (1.73 m)
- Listed weight: 165 lb (75 kg)

Career information
- High school: Santa Ana (CA) Valley
- College: San Diego State
- NFL draft: 1974: undrafted

Career history
- St. Louis Cardinals (1974)*; Southern California Sun (1974–1975); San Francisco 49ers (1976)*; New York Jets (1976)
- * Offseason or practice squad member only

Awards and highlights
- Second-team All-Coast (1973)
- Stats at Pro Football Reference

Keith Denson (born August 30, 1952) is an American former professional football player who was a wide receiver for the New York Jets of the National Football League (NFL). He played college football for the San Diego State Aztecs. He played for the Southern California Sun of the World Football League from 1974 to 1975 before joining the Jets in 1976.
