= Woody Green =

American football player (born 1951)

No. 27
- Position: Running back

Personal information
- Born: June 20, 1951 (age 75); Warren, Oregon, U.S.
- Listed height: 6 ft 0 in (1.83 m)
- Listed weight: 205 lb (93 kg)

Career information
- High school: Jefferson (Portland, Oregon)
- College: Arizona State
- NFL draft: 1974: 1st round, 16th overall pick

Career history
- Kansas City Chiefs (1974–1976)

Awards and highlights
- 2× Consensus All-American (1972, 1973); WAC Offensive Player of the Year (1972); WAC Newcomer of the Year (1971)

Career NFL statistics
- Rushing attempts: 375
- Rushing yards: 1,442
- Receptions: 58
- Receiving yards: 562
- Total touchdowns: 11
- Stats at Pro Football Reference

Woodrow Green Jr. (born June 20, 1951) is an American former professional football player who was a running back for the Kansas City Chiefs of the National Football League (NFL). Green was selected 16th overall by the Chiefs in the first round of the 1974 NFL draft. Playing college football for the Arizona State Sun Devils, he set many rushing records and was a first-team AP All-American. Green appeared on the front cover of the Sports Illustrated November 18, 1974 issue. His NFL career was shortened because of multiple knee injuries/surgeries.

== College statistics ==
- 1971: 208 for 1,209 and 9 TD
- 1972: 209 for 1,363 and 15 TD, 9 catches for 115, consensus All-American
- 1973: 184 for 1,182 and 9 TD, 22 catches for 328 and 5 TD, consensus All-American, finished eight in Heisman Trophy voting
