= 1974 Lafayette Leopards football team =

American college football season

1974 Lafayette Leopards football
- Conference: Independent
- Record: 3–7
- Head coach: Neil Putnam (4th season)
- Captains: Adam Piergallini; Michael Slattery
- Home stadium: Fisher Field

1974 NCAA Division II independents football records
	Conf.			Overall
Team	W	L	T	W		L		T
No. 1 Central Michigan ^		–		12	–	1	–	0
No. 6 UNLV ^		–		12	–	1	–	0
No. 4 Delaware ^		–		12	–	2	–	0
No. 8 Western Carolina ^		–		9	–	2	–	0
No. 9 Tennessee State		–		8	–	2	–	0
No. 12 Youngstown State ^		–		8	–	2	–	0
Santa Clara		–		7	–	3	–	0
Wayne State (MI)		–		7	–	3	–	0
Ball State		–		6	–	4	–	0
Kentucky State		–		6	–	4	–	0
Northeastern		–		6	–	4	–	0
Central State (OH)		–		6	–	5	–	0
Akron		–		5	–	5	–	0
Indiana State		–		5	–	5	–	0
Nevada		–		5	–	6	–	0
Portland State		–		5	–	6	–	0
American International		–		4	–	5	–	0
Eastern Michigan		–		4	–	6	–	1
Milwaukee		–		4	–	6	–	0
Northeast Louisiana		–		4	–	6	–	0
Eastern Illinois		–		3	–	6	–	1
Arkansas–Pine Bluff		–		3	–	5	–	0
Chattanooga		–		4	–	7	–	0
Nebraska–Omaha		–		3	–	7	–	0
Bucknell		–		2	–	8	–	0
Northern Michigan		–		0	–	10	–	0
^ – NCAA Division II playoff participant; Rankings from AP small college poll

The 1974 Lafayette Leopards football team was an American football team that represented Lafayette College as an independent during the 1974 NCAA Division II football season. In their fourth year under head coach Neil Putnam, the Leopards compiled a 3–7 record. Adam Piergallini and Michael Slattery were the team captains. Lafayette played its home games at Fisher Field on College Hill in Easton, Pennsylvania.

== Schedule ==
Date	Opponent	Site	Result	Attendance	Source
September 14	at Army	Michie Stadium; West Point, NY	L 7–14	26,838–27,000	
September 21	Merchant Marine	Fisher Field; Easton, PA	L 13–17	4,500	
September 28	at Columbia	Baker Field; New York, NY	W 15–0	3,491–3,500	
October 5	at Gettysburg	Musselman Stadium; Gettysburg, PA	W 14–3	4,800	
October 12	at Hofstra	Hofstra Stadium; Hempstead, NY	W 17–7	1,375	
October 19	Penn	Fisher Field; Easton, PA	L 7–37	11,000–11,500	
October 26	Colgate	Fisher Field; Easton, PA	L 18–24	4,000	
November 2	at Bucknell	Memorial Stadium; Lewisburg, PA	L 6–10	8,000–8,500	
November 9	Rutgers	Fisher Field; Easton, PA	L 0–35	7,500	
November 23	Lehigh	Fisher Field; Easton, PA (The Rivalry)	L 7–57	16,000	
