= 1974 Lehigh Engineers football team =

American college football season

1974 Lehigh Engineers football
- Conference: Independent
- Record: 7–3
- Head coach: Fred Dunlap (10th season)
- Offensive coordinator: John Whitehead (5th season)
- Captains: Jim Addonizio; Joe Alleva
- Home stadium: Taylor Stadium

1974 NCAA Division II independents football records
	Conf.			Overall
Team	W	L	T	W		L		T
No. 1 Central Michigan ^		–		12	–	1	–	0
No. 6 UNLV ^		–		12	–	1	–	0
No. 4 Delaware ^		–		12	–	2	–	0
No. 8 Western Carolina ^		–		9	–	2	–	0
No. 9 Tennessee State		–		8	–	2	–	0
No. 12 Youngstown State ^		–		8	–	2	–	0
Santa Clara		–		7	–	3	–	0
Wayne State (MI)		–		7	–	3	–	0
Ball State		–		6	–	4	–	0
Kentucky State		–		6	–	4	–	0
Northeastern		–		6	–	4	–	0
Central State (OH)		–		6	–	5	–	0
Akron		–		5	–	5	–	0
Indiana State		–		5	–	5	–	0
Nevada		–		5	–	6	–	0
Portland State		–		5	–	6	–	0
American International		–		4	–	5	–	0
Eastern Michigan		–		4	–	6	–	1
Milwaukee		–		4	–	6	–	0
Northeast Louisiana		–		4	–	6	–	0
Eastern Illinois		–		3	–	6	–	1
Arkansas–Pine Bluff		–		3	–	5	–	0
Chattanooga		–		4	–	7	–	0
Nebraska–Omaha		–		3	–	7	–	0
Bucknell		–		2	–	8	–	0
Northern Michigan		–		0	–	10	–	0
^ – NCAA Division II playoff participant; Rankings from AP small college poll

The 1974 Lehigh Engineers football team was an American football team that represented Lehigh University as an independent during the 1974 NCAA Division II football season.

In their tenth year under head coach Fred Dunlap, the Engineers compiled a 7–3 record. Jim Addonizio and Joe Alleva were the team captains.

After starting the season with two wins, the Engineers briefly appeared in the UPI small college poll, ranking No. 15 for the last full week of September. A loss that weekend to Division I opponent Penn dropped them out of the top 20. Lehigh remained unranked the rest of the year.

Lehigh played its home games at Taylor Stadium on the university campus in Bethlehem, Pennsylvania.

== Schedule ==
Date	Opponent	Site	Result	Attendance	Source
September 14	Hofstra	Taylor Stadium; Bethlehem, PA	W 40–0	8,000	
September 21	at Colgate	Andy Kerr Stadium; Hamilton, NY	W 33–12	4,500	
September 27	at Penn	Franklin Field; Philadelphia, PA	L 18–28	17,855	
October 12	at Rutgers	Rutgers Stadium; Piscataway, NJ	L 16–37	17,500	
October 19	at No. 3 Delaware	Delaware Stadium; Newark, DE (rivalry)	L 7–14	14,500	
October 26	at Maine	Alumni Stadium; Orono, ME	W 35–26	3,300–5,000	
November 2	Gettysburg	Taylor Stadium; Bethlehem, PA	W 14–6	13,000	
November 9	Davidson	Taylor Stadium; Bethlehem, PA	W 53–6	7,000	
November 16	Bucknell	Taylor Stadium; Bethlehem, PA	W 33–7	10,300	
November 23	at Lafayette	Fisher Field; Easton, PA (The Rivalry)	W 57–7	16,000	
Rankings from AP Poll released prior to the game
