= List of Boston University Terriers head football coaches =

List of head football coaches for the Boston University Terriers

The Boston University Terriers college football program represented Boston University, last in the New England Division of the Atlantic 10 Conference (A-10), as part of the NCAA Division I-AA. The program had 20 head coaches, and 1 interim head coach, since it began play during the 1884 season. The final head coach of the Terriers was Tom Masella who served for the 1996 and 1997 seasons.

Three coaches have led Boston University in postseason bowl games or playoffs: Larry Naviaux, Rick Taylor, and Dan Allen. Two of these coaches also won conference championships: Taylor captured four and Allen one as a member of the Yankee Conference.

Aldo Donelli is the leader in seasons coached, with 10 years as head coach. Taylor is the leader and games coached (88), won (55), and highest winning percentage at 0.631. Excluding interim head coaches, Masella has the lowest winning percentage with 0.091.

== Key ==
Key to symbols in coaches list
| General | | Overall | | Conference | | Postseason (Note: Although the first Rose Bowl Game was played in 1902, it has been continuously played since the 1916 game, and is recognized as the oldest bowl game by the NCAA. "—" indicates any season prior to 1916 when postseason games were not played.) | |
|---|---|---|---|---|---|---|---|
| No. | Order of coaches (Note: A running total of the number of head coaches, with coaches who served separate tenures being counted only once. Interim head coaches are represented with "Int" and are not counted in the running total. "—" indicates the team played but either without a coach or no coach is on record. "X" indicates an interim year without play.) | GC | Games coached | CW | Conference wins | PW | Postseason wins |
| DC | Division championships | OW | Overall wins | CL | Conference losses | PL | Postseason losses |
| CC | Conference championships | OL | Overall losses | CT | Conference ties | PT | Postseason ties |
| NC | National championships | OT | Overall ties (Note: Overtime rules in college football were introduced in 1996, making ties impossible in the period since.) | C% | Conference winning percentage | | |
| † | Elected to the College Football Hall of Fame | O% | Overall winning percentage (Note: When computing the win–loss percentage, a tie counts as half a win and half a loss.) | | | | |

== Coaches ==
List of head football coaches showing season(s) coached, overall records, conference records, postseason records, championships and selected awards (Note: Statistics correct as of the end of the 1997 NCAA Division I-AA football season.)
| No. | Name (Note: Boston University did not have a head coach for their 1884, 1886–1887, 1891–1897, 1904–1905, or 1917 seasons.) | Season(s) (Note: Boston University did not field teams during the 1885, 1888–1890, 1898–1903, 1906–1916, or 1943–1944 seasons.) | GC | OW | OL | OT | O% | CW | CL | CT | C% | PW | PL | PT | DC | CC | NC | Awards |
|---|---|---|---|---|---|---|---|---|---|---|---|---|---|---|---|---|---|---|
| 1 | John MacDonald | 1918–1919 | 10 | 3 | 6 | 1 | 0.350 | — | — | — | — | — | — | — | — | — | 0 | — |
| 2 | Percy Wendell | 1920 | 8 | 4 | 3 | 1 | 0.563 | — | — | — | — | — | — | — | — | — | 0 | — |
| 3 | Charles Whelan | 1921–1925 | 36 | 11 | 22 | 3 | 0.347 | — | — | — | — | — | — | — | — | — | 0 | — |
| 4 | Edward N. Robinson (Note: Robinson served as co-head coach with Reggie Brown from 1926 to 1929.) | 1926–1929 | 33 | 11 | 19 | 3 | 0.379 | — | — | — | — | — | — | — | — | — | 0 | — |
| 4 | Reggie Brown (Note: Brown served as co-head coach with Edward N. Robinson from 1926 to 1929.) | 1926–1929 | 33 | 11 | 19 | 3 | 0.379 | — | — | — | — | — | — | — | — | — | 0 | — |
| 5 | Hilary Mahaney | 1930–1931 | 18 | 3 | 14 | 1 | 0.194 | — | — | — | — | — | — | — | — | — | 0 | — |
| 6 | Myles Lane | 1932 | 7 | 2 | 3 | 2 | 0.429 | — | — | — | — | — | — | — | — | — | 0 | — |
| 7 | John Harmon | 1933 | 7 | 2 | 5 | 0 | 0.286 | — | — | — | — | — | — | — | — | — | 0 | — |
| 8 | Pat Hanley | 1934–1941 | 64 | 35 | 24 | 5 | 0.586 | — | — | — | — | — | — | — | — | — | 0 | — |
| 9 | Walt Holmer | 1942; 1945–1946 | 17 | 9 | 7 | 1 | 0.559 | — | — | — | — | — | — | — | — | — | 0 | — |
| Int | Robert McKelvey (Note: McKelvey served as interim head coach until Holmer was discharged from the Navy and resumed his coaching duties on November 5, 1945.) | 1945 | 3 | 0 | 3 | 0 | .000 | — | — | — | — | — | — | — | — | — | 0 | — |
| 10 | Aldo Donelli | 1947–1956 | 86 | 46 | 36 | 4 | 0.558 | — | — | — | — | — | — | — | — | — | 0 | — |
| 11 | Steve Sinko | 1957–1963 | 62 | 23 | 36 | 3 | 0.395 | — | — | — | — | — | — | — | — | — | 0 | — |
| 12 | Warren Schmakel | 1964–1967 | 46 | 20 | 24 | 2 | 0.457 | — | — | — | — | — | — | — | — | — | 0 | — |
| 13 | Larry Naviaux | 1969–1972 | 40 | 19 | 21 | 0 | 0.475 | — | — | — | — | 0 | 1 | 0 | — | — | 0 | — |
| 14 | Paul Kemp | 1973–1976 | 41 | 16 | 24 | 1 | 0.402 | 7 | 14 | 0 | 0.333 | 0 | 0 | 0 | — | 0 | 0 | — |
| 15 | Rick Taylor | 1977–1984 | 88 | 55 | 32 | 1 | 0.631 | 26 | 14 | 0 | 0.650 | 1 | 3 | 0 | — | 4 | 0 | — |
| 16 | Steve Stetson | 1985–1987 | 33 | 10 | 23 | 0 | 0.303 | 6 | 13 | 0 | 0.316 | 0 | 0 | 0 | — | 0 | 0 | — |
| 17 | Chris Palmer | 1988–1989 | 22 | 8 | 14 | 0 | 0.364 | 7 | 9 | 0 | 0.438 | 0 | 0 | 0 | — | 0 | 0 | — |
| 18 | Dan Allen | 1990–1995 | 69 | 36 | 33 | 0 | 0.522 | 24 | 24 | 0 | 0.500 | 1 | 2 | 0 | 1 | 1 | 0 | — |
| 19 | Tom Masella | 1996–1997 | 22 | 2 | 20 | — | 0.091 | 1 | 15 | — | 0.063 | 0 | 0 | — | 0 | 0 | 0 | — |
