= University of San Francisco International Business Plan Competition =

University of San Francisco International Business Plan Competition has been held each year from 2004 to 2009 involving teams of students presenting a business plan to judges. A cash prize is awarded to the winning team.

== History ==
The University of San Francisco International Business Plan Competition was founded in 2003. The founding chair of the contest was Dr. Mark Cannice of the USF School of Business and Management.

The Grand Champion of the 1st annual event was Mobius Microsystems, from the University of Michigan.

2004's Competition drew 25 teams from around the world with an equally impressive panel of judges (e.g. Shawn Fanning), and was featured in SF Chronicle in three separate SFChronicle articles.

In 2005, it was renamed as the USF-Pacific Specialty Insurance International Business Plan Competition in honor of its largest donor. It was also the first time that the Competition was held in conjunction with the San Francisco-Silicon Valley Global Entrepreneurship Research Conference, and was once again featured on SFChronicle . Judges included Intuit Chairman Bill Campbell, Co-founder of Gordon Biersch Brewing Co. Dan Gordon, and CEO of Pacific Specialty Insurance Mike McGraw.

Approximately 90 business plans were submitted from six continents to qualify for the 2006 USF-PSI International Business Plan Competition. 20 were selected for the event held at the Miyako Hotel from March 22 to 25 with the top team automatically qualifying for Moot Corp at UT Austin. By this time, the competition is renowned for its panel of top-notch entrepreneurs and venture capitalists in the Bay Area, and was featured on CNET for the first time .

The 2007 USF Contest, held March 25–28, with the winner (a life science proposal) coming again from the Univ. of Illinois at Chicago.

To listen to the Elevator Pitches from this year's competition click here. April 1, 2007

The 2008 Contest was held April 3–5 in San Francisco.

The 7th annual USF IBPC was held March 5–6, 2009 and had a new chair, Professor Brett Bonthron.

The winning team of the 2009 contest is from MIT and Boston University.

== Prehistory ==
The first Business Plan Competition at The University of San Francisco was held in June 2000. It was planned, organized, and hosted by the fledgling USF Entrepreneurship Club, an MBA student organization founded in Fall of 1999 seeking to:

- sponsor programs that cultivate the creation of new businesses,
- create a safe environment for students to share ideas and gather support from one another, and
- be a representative voice for entrepreneurial MBA students at USF

The first USF Business Plan Competition was won by

- SonicBit for its interactive digital media terminal, the Atom, to serve the market of social venues with digital content.

Joe Henderson, PMBA Student, was also the winner with his start-up: Gray Matter, Matters, and the TV Show - Inquizikids. An educational expansion to TV, video, and streaming to bring educational content to the youth, offering areas of history, manufacturing, world geography, innovation, invention, and entrepreneurship. Joe Henderson was awarded $10,000 and a copy of Business Plan Pro, which he used to develop a clearer, concise business plan, inevitably raising $500,000 towards his business. During the development, Joe partnered with Scott Schaefer, head writer of Bill Nye the Science Guy from 1993-1995.
The judges for the first USF Business Plan Competition included:

- John Van Dyke, Dakota Group
- Linda Glisson, Glisson Capital
- David Greco, Panoramic Ventures

In the Fall of 2000, the faculty of the USF Business School, led by Mark Cannice, organized the USF New Venture Center (later renamed the Entrepreneurship Program) after which time the Business Plan Competition has been co-organized by both the MBA faculty and the students of the Entrepreneurship Club. Additional competitions were held in Fall 2000, Spring 2001, Fall 2001, and Spring 2002 before the competition was rebranded as "The University of San Francisco International Business Plan Competition" in 2003.

== Other Achievements ==
In Fall 2006, a list compiled by The Entrepreneur Magazine in partnership with The Princeton Review placed USF's MBA Entrepreneurship Program as one of the Top 25 graduate programs.
