= 1974 Penn Quakers football team =

American college football season

1974 Penn Quakers football
- Conference: Ivy League
- Record: 6–2–1 (4–2–1 Ivy)
- Head coach: Harry Gamble (4th season)
- Defensive coordinator: Otto Kneidinger (4th season)
- Captain: Marty Vaughn
- Home stadium: Franklin Field

1974 Ivy League football standings
	Conf.					Overall
Team	W		L		T	W		L		T
Harvard +	6	–	1	–	0	7	–	2	–	0
Yale +	6	–	1	–	0	8	–	1	–	0
Penn	4	–	2	–	1	6	–	2	–	1
Brown	4	–	3	–	0	5	–	4	–	0
Dartmouth	3	–	4	–	0	3	–	6	–	0
Princeton	3	–	4	–	0	4	–	4	–	1
Cornell	1	–	5	–	1	3	–	5	–	1
Columbia	0	–	7	–	0	1	–	8	–	0
+ – Conference co-champions

The 1974 Penn Quakers football team represented the University of Pennsylvania as a member of the Ivy League during the 1974 NCAA Division I football season. In their fourth year under head coach Harry Gamble, the Quakers compiled an overall record of 6–2–1 with a mark of 4–2–1 in conference play, placing third in the Ivy League. Penn outscored opponents 187 to 179. Marty Vaughn was the team captain. Penn played home games at Franklin Field, adjacent to the university's campus in Philadelphia.

== Schedule ==
Date	Opponent	Site	Result	Attendance	Source
September 27	Lehigh*	Franklin Field; Philadelphia, PA	W 28–18	17,855	
October 5	at Brown	Brown Stadium; Providence, RI	W 14–9	5,000	
October 12	at Cornell	Schoellkopf Field; Ithaca, NY (rivalry)	T 28–28	14,000	
October 19	at Lafayette*	Fisher Field; Easton, PA	W 37–7	11,500	
October 26	Princeton	Franklin Field; Philadelphia, PA (rivalry)	W 20–18	23,317	
November 2	at Harvard	Harvard Stadium; Boston, MA (rivalry)	L 0–39	17,000	
November 9	Yale	Franklin Field; Philadelphia, PA	L 12–37	23,490	
November 16	Columbia	Franklin Field; Philadelphia, PA	W 21–3	8,259	
November 23	Dartmouth	Franklin Field; Philadelphia, PA	W 27–20	27,113	
*Non-conference game

== Roster ==
1974 Penn Quakers football team roster
Players
Coaches
Offense

Pos.	#	Name	Class
WR	28	Steve Hasselbeck	Jr
TE	80	Mark Iwanowski	So
RB	44	Steve Kochersperger	Sr

Defense

Pos.	#	Name	Class
LB	37	Bob Nix	So

Special teams

Pos.	#	Name	Class
K	64	Tim Mazzetti	So

Head coach

- Harry Gamble

Coordinators/assistant coaches

Legend

- (C) Team captain
- (S) Suspended
- (I) Ineligible
- Injured
- Redshirt
