= 1975 Penn Quakers football team =

American college football season

1975 Penn Quakers football
- Conference: Ivy League
- Record: 3–6 (2–5 Ivy)
- Head coach: Harry Gamble (5th season)
- Defensive coordinator: Otto Kneidinger (5th season)
- Captains: Ron Kellogg; Jeff Koury; John Wixted
- Home stadium: Franklin Field

1975 Ivy League football standings
	Conf.					Overall
Team	W		L		T	W		L		T
Harvard $	6	–	1	–	0	7	–	2	–	0
Brown	5	–	1	–	1	6	–	2	–	1
Yale	5	–	2	–	0	7	–	2	–	0
Dartmouth	4	–	2	–	1	5	–	3	–	1
Princeton	3	–	4	–	0	4	–	5	–	0
Penn	2	–	5	–	0	3	–	6	–	0
Columbia	2	–	5	–	0	2	–	7	–	0
Cornell	0	–	7	–	0	1	–	8	–	0
$ – Conference champion

The 1975 Penn Quakers football team represented the University of Pennsylvania as a member of the Ivy League during the 1975 NCAA Division I football season. In their fifth year under head coach Harry Gamble, the Quakers compiled an overall record of 3–6 with a mark of 2–5 in conference play, tying for sixth place in the Ivy League. Ron Kellogg, Jeff Koury, and John Wixted were the team captains. Penn played home games at Franklin Field, adjacent to the university's campus in Philadelphia.

== Schedule ==
Date	Opponent	Site	Result	Attendance	Source
September 27	at Lehigh*	Taylor Stadium; Bethlehem, PA	L 23–34	14,000	
October 4	Brown	Franklin Field; Philadelphia, PA	L 8–17	14,275	
October 11	at Dartmouth	Memorial Field; Hanover, NH	L 14–19	12,600	
October 17	Lafayette*	Franklin Field; Philadelphia, PA	W 13–0	3,127–3,176	
October 25	at Princeton	Palmer Stadium; Princeton, NJ (rivalry)	W 24–20	12,500	
November 1	Harvard^{†}	Franklin Field; Philadelphia, PA (rivalry)	L 3–21	17,256	
November 8	at Yale	Yale Bowl; New Haven, CT	L 14–24	18,740	
November 15	at Columbia	Baker Field; New York, NY	L 25–28	4,125	
November 22	Cornell	Franklin Field; Philadelphia, PA (rivalry)	W 27–21	21,112	
*Non-conference game; ^{†}Homecoming

== Roster ==
1975 Penn Quakers football team roster
Players
Coaches
Offense

Pos.	#	Name	Class
QB	12	Bob Graustein	Jr
WR	28	Steve Hasselbeck	Sr
TE	80	Mark Iwanowski	Jr
G	63	John Meyer	Sr

Defense

Pos.	#	Name	Class
LB	55	John Petit	Sr

Special teams

Pos.	#	Name	Class
K	44	Tim Mazzetti	Sr

Head coach

- Harry Gamble

Coordinators/assistant coaches

Legend

- (C) Team captain
- (S) Suspended
- (I) Ineligible
- Injured
- Redshirt
