= 1974 Boston University Terriers football team =

American college football season

1974 Boston University Terriers football
- Conference: Yankee Conference
- Record: 5–4–1 (3–3 Yankee)
- Head coach: Paul Kemp (2nd season)
- Home stadium: Nickerson Field

1974 Yankee Conference football standings
	Conf.					Overall
Team	W		L		T	W		L		T
UMass +	4	–	2	–	0	5	–	6	–	0
Maine +	4	–	2	–	0	4	–	6	–	0
New Hampshire	3	–	3	–	0	5	–	4	–	0
Rhode Island	3	–	3	–	0	5	–	5	–	0
Boston University	3	–	3	–	0	5	–	4	–	1
Connecticut	3	–	3	–	0	4	–	6	–	0
Vermont	1	–	5	–	0	4	–	6	–	0
+ – Conference co-champions

The 1974 Boston University Terriers football team represented Boston University as a member of the Yankee Conference during the 1974 NCAA Division II football season. In its second season under head coach Paul Kemp, the team compiled a 5–4–1 record (3–3 against conference opponents), placed in a four-way tie for third in the Yankee Conference, and outscored opponents 145 to 129.

When coach Paul Kemp took over at Boston University in 1973, he inherited a team that finished 2–8 in 1972. The team improved to 3–8 in 1973. Kemp termed the 1974 season "Project Turnabout", and the team opened with three wins and one loss. The team went 2–3–1 in its final four games, but still wound up with the program's first winning season since 1970. Near the end of the season, coach Kemp said: "We're happy with our winning season. I think we're a pretty good team and we've been getting better in each game."

Several Boston University players received post-season honors in 1974. Five were named to the All-Yankee Conference football team selected by the conference coaches: offensive tackle Jim Roderick, offensive guard Kevin Brooks, center Don Chrisos, linebacker Gary Dziama, and cornerback Rick Porter. Two (Chrisos and Dziama) were also named first-team players on the All-New England team.

Boston University played its home games on Nickerson Field, which was part of the Case Sports Complex and was formerly known as Braves Field, the home of the Boston Braves.

== Schedule ==
Date	Opponent	Site	Result	Attendance	Source
September 13	Maine	Nickerson Field; Boston, MA	W 7–6	2,424	
September 21	at New Hampshire	Cowell Stadium; Durham, NH	L 0–28	7,257	
September 28	at Vermont	Centennial Field; Burlington, VT	W 29–6	3,750–3,950	
October 4	Northeastern*	Nickerson Field; Boston, MA	W 33–8	4,226	
October 12	at UMass	Alumni Stadium; Hadley, MA	L 14–21	11,100	
October 19	Bucknell*	Nickerson Field; Boston, MA	W 14–10	2,152–2,177	
October 26	at Rhode Island	Meade Stadium; Kingston, RI	L 7–13	3,112	
November 1	Holy Cross*	Nickerson Field; Boston, MA	T 14–14	5,454	
November 9	at Connecticut	Memorial Stadium; Storrs, CT	W 27–17	9,998	
November 16	at Rutgers*	Rutgers Stadium; New Brunswick, NJ	L 0–6	13,500	
*Non-conference game
