= 1974 New Hampshire Wildcats football team =

American college football season

1974 New Hampshire Wildcats football
- Conference: Yankee Conference
- Record: 5–4 (3–3 Yankee)
- Head coach: Bill Bowes (3rd season)
- Home stadium: Cowell Stadium

1974 Yankee Conference football standings
	Conf.					Overall
Team	W		L		T	W		L		T
UMass +	4	–	2	–	0	5	–	6	–	0
Maine +	4	–	2	–	0	4	–	6	–	0
New Hampshire	3	–	3	–	0	5	–	4	–	0
Rhode Island	3	–	3	–	0	5	–	5	–	0
Boston University	3	–	3	–	0	5	–	4	–	1
Connecticut	3	–	3	–	0	4	–	6	–	0
Vermont	1	–	5	–	0	4	–	6	–	0
+ – Conference co-champions

The 1974 New Hampshire Wildcats football team represented the University of New Hampshire in the 1974 NCAA Division II football season. They were led by third-year head coach Bill Bowes and finished the season 5–4 overall and 3–3 in the Yankee Conference, placing in a four-way tie for third.

== Schedule ==
Date	Opponent	Site	Result	Attendance	Source
September 21	Boston University	Cowell Stadium; Durham, NH	W 28–0	7,257	
September 28	at No. 4 Delaware*	Delaware Stadium; Newark, DE	L 10–34	19,388	
October 5	Connecticut	Cowell Stadium; Durham, NH	L 24–41	11,240	
October 12	Maine	Cowell Stadium; Durham, NH (Battle for the Brice–Cowell Musket)	L 9–23	12,387–12,390	
October 19	at Vermont	Centennial Field; Burlington, VT	W 38–21	7,550–9,123	
October 26	at Northeastern*	Parsons Field; Brookline, MA	W 34–14	5,237	
November 2	Rhode Island	Cowell Stadium; Durham, NH	W 29–14	9,912	
November 9	Springfield*	Cowell Stadium; Durham, NH	W 27–18	7,227	
November 16	at UMass	Alumni Stadium; Hadley, MA (rivalry)	L 17–27	11,300	
*Non-conference game; Rankings from AP Poll released prior to the game
