= 1974 Bucknell Bison football team =

American college football season

1974 Bucknell Bison football
- Conference: Independent
- Record: 2–8
- Head coach: Fred Prender (6th season)
- Captains: Mike Axe; Larry Schoeneberger
- Home stadium: Memorial Stadium

1974 NCAA Division II independents football records
	Conf.			Overall
Team	W	L	T	W		L		T
No. 1 Central Michigan ^		–		12	–	1	–	0
No. 6 UNLV ^		–		12	–	1	–	0
No. 4 Delaware ^		–		12	–	2	–	0
No. 8 Western Carolina ^		–		9	–	2	–	0
No. 9 Tennessee State		–		8	–	2	–	0
No. 12 Youngstown State ^		–		8	–	2	–	0
Santa Clara		–		7	–	3	–	0
Wayne State (MI)		–		7	–	3	–	0
Ball State		–		6	–	4	–	0
Kentucky State		–		6	–	4	–	0
Northeastern		–		6	–	4	–	0
Central State (OH)		–		6	–	5	–	0
Akron		–		5	–	5	–	0
Indiana State		–		5	–	5	–	0
Nevada		–		5	–	6	–	0
Portland State		–		5	–	6	–	0
American International		–		4	–	5	–	0
Eastern Michigan		–		4	–	6	–	1
Milwaukee		–		4	–	6	–	0
Northeast Louisiana		–		4	–	6	–	0
Eastern Illinois		–		3	–	6	–	1
Arkansas–Pine Bluff		–		3	–	5	–	0
Chattanooga		–		4	–	7	–	0
Nebraska–Omaha		–		3	–	7	–	0
Bucknell		–		2	–	8	–	0
Northern Michigan		–		0	–	10	–	0
^ – NCAA Division II playoff participant; Rankings from AP small college poll

The 1974 Bucknell Bison football team was an American football team that represented Bucknell University as an independent during the 1974 NCAA Division II football season.

In their sixth and final year under head coach Fred Prender, the Bison compiled a 2–8 record. Mike Axe and Larry Schoeneberger were the team captains.

Bucknell played its home games at Memorial Stadium on the university campus in Lewisburg, Pennsylvania.

== Schedule ==
Date	Opponent	Site	Result	Attendance	Source
September 21	Rutgers	Memorial Stadium; Lewisburg, PA	L 14–16	4,500	
September 28	Maine	Memorial Stadium; Lewisburg, PA	W 30–18	2,500	
October 5	at Cornell	Schoellkopf Field; Ithaca, NY	L 0–24	10,000	
October 12	Gettysburg^{†}	Memorial Stadium; Lewisburg, PA	L 14–21	8,500	
October 19	at Boston University	Nickerson Field; Boston, MA	L 10–14	2,152–2,177	
October 26	at Columbia	Baker Field; New York, NY	L 33–38	3,227	
November 2	Lafayette^	Memorial Stadium; Lewisburg, PA	W 10–6	8,000–8,500	
November 9	Colgate	Memorial Stadium; Lewisburg, PA	L 21–34	6,000–7,250	
November 16	at Lehigh	Taylor Stadium; Bethlehem, PA	L 7–33	10,300	
November 23	at No. 3 Delaware	Delaware Stadium; Newark, DE	L 16–51	16,583	
^{†}Homecoming; ^ Parents Weekend; Rankings from AP Poll released prior to the game
