= 1975 Cornell Big Red football team =

American college football season

1975 Cornell Big Red football
- Conference: Ivy League
- Record: 1–8 (0–7 Ivy)
- Head coach: George Seifert (1st season)
- Captains: Don Fanelli; Steve Horrigan
- Home stadium: Schoellkopf Field

1975 Ivy League football standings
	Conf.					Overall
Team	W		L		T	W		L		T
Harvard $	6	–	1	–	0	7	–	2	–	0
Brown	5	–	1	–	1	6	–	2	–	1
Yale	5	–	2	–	0	7	–	2	–	0
Dartmouth	4	–	2	–	1	5	–	3	–	1
Princeton	3	–	4	–	0	4	–	5	–	0
Penn	2	–	5	–	0	3	–	6	–	0
Columbia	2	–	5	–	0	2	–	7	–	0
Cornell	0	–	7	–	0	1	–	8	–	0
$ – Conference champion

The 1975 Cornell Big Red football team was an American football team that represented Cornell University during the 1975 NCAA Division I football season. Cornell finished last in the Ivy League.

In its first season under head coach George Seifert, the team compiled a 1–8 record and was outscored 247 to 151. Don Fanelli and Steve Horrigan were the team captains.

Cornell's winless (0–7) conference record placed last in the Ivy League standings. The Big Red were outscored 217 to 108 by Ivy opponents.

Cornell played its home games at Schoellkopf Field in Ithaca, New York.

== Schedule ==
Date	Opponent	Site	Result	Attendance	Source
September 27	Colgate*	Schoellkopf Field; Ithaca, NY (rivalry)	L 22–24	14,000	
October 4	at Bucknell*	Memorial Stadium; Lewisburg, PA	W 21–6	9,500	
October 11	Princeton	Schoellkopf Field; Ithaca, NY	L 8–16	15,000	
October 18	Harvard	Schoellkopf Field; Ithaca, NY	L 13–34	18,000	
October 25	at Yale	Yale Bowl; New Haven, CT	L 14–20	13,988	
November 1	Columbia	Schoellkopf Field; Ithaca, NY (rivalry)	L 19–42	11,000	
November 8	Brown	Schoellkopf Field; Ithaca, NY	L 23–45	10,000	
November 15	at Dartmouth	Memorial Field; Hanover, NH (rivalry)	L 10–33	12,300	
November 22	at Penn	Franklin Field; Philadelphia, PA (rivalry)	L 21–27	21,112	
*Non-conference game
