= George Burrell (American football) =

American football player (born 1948)

No. 41
- Position: Safety

Personal information
- Born: January 1, 1948 (age 78); Camden, New Jersey, U.S.
- Listed height: 5 ft 10 in (1.78 m)
- Listed weight: 180 lb (82 kg)

Career information
- High school: Kingsway Regional (Woolwich Township, New Jersey)
- College: Penn (1965-1968)
- NFL draft: 1969: undrafted

Career history
- Denver Broncos (1969)

Career AFL statistics
- Interceptions: 2
- Kick/punt return yards: 164
- Touchdowns: 1
- Stats at Pro Football Reference

George Reed Burrell Jr. (born January 1, 1948) is an American former professional football player who was a safety for the Denver Broncos of the American Football League (AFL) in 1969. he played college football for the Penn Quakers.

Born in Camden, New Jersey, Burrell played prep football at Kingsway Regional High School.
