= 1974 Vermont Catamounts football team =

American college football season

1974 Vermont Catamounts football
- Conference: Yankee Conference
- Record: 4–6 (1–5 Yankee)
- Head coach: Carl Falivene (3rd season)
- Home stadium: Centennial Field

1974 Yankee Conference football standings
	Conf.					Overall
Team	W		L		T	W		L		T
UMass +	4	–	2	–	0	5	–	6	–	0
Maine +	4	–	2	–	0	4	–	6	–	0
New Hampshire	3	–	3	–	0	5	–	4	–	0
Rhode Island	3	–	3	–	0	5	–	5	–	0
Boston University	3	–	3	–	0	5	–	4	–	1
Connecticut	3	–	3	–	0	4	–	6	–	0
Vermont	1	–	5	–	0	4	–	6	–	0
+ – Conference co-champions

The 1974 Vermont Catamounts football team represented the Vermont Catamounts football team of the University of Vermont during the 1974 NCAA Division II football season. Notably, the team came from behind 14-0 to defeat UMass 25-14 (and after they had just come off shutout victories over Dartmouth and Maine) for the first win against them at all since 1954 and for the first time at UMass since 1921. After the season the university student yearbook would say "This was the year that no one laughed at U.V. M. Football . . . A lot can be said for the 1974 Football Catamounts and what the future held in store for them. The Cats had the beginnings of what it takes to be winners both physically and mentally . . . The 1974 Vermont Catamounts were a young team with over forty lettermen. They indeed were going to be a team to watch." This was and remains Vermont's last season with an NCAA program.

== Schedule ==
Date	Opponent	Site	Result	Attendance	Source
September 14	Norwich*	Centennial Field; Burlington, VT	W 28–26	6,384–8,912	
September 21	at Connecticut	Memorial Stadium; Storrs, CT	L 22–36	4,752–8,752	
September 28	Boston University	Centennial Field; Burlington, VT	L 6–29	3,750–3,950	
October 5	at UMass	Alumni Stadium; Hadley, MA	W 25–14	13,500	
October 12	at Rhode Island	Meade Stadium; Kingston, RI	L 0–14	5,212	
October 19	New Hampshire^{†}	Centennial Field; Burlington, VT	L 21–38	7,550–9,123	
October 26	Rochester*	Centennial Field; Burlington, VT	W 21–12	2,844	
November 2	at Maine	Alumni Stadium; Orono, ME	L 27–31	1,700–2,900	
November 9	Northeastern*	Centennial Field; Burlington, VT	W 22–14	2,730–3,783	
November 16	American International*	Centennial Field; Burlington, VT	L 15–41	2,300	
*Non-conference game; ^{†}Homecoming
