= 1975 Brown Bears football team =

American college football season

1975 Brown Bears football
- Conference: Ivy League
- Record: 6–2–1 (5–1–1 Ivy)
- Head coach: John Anderson (3rd season)
- Captains: Paul Serrano; Kevin Slattery
- Home stadium: Brown Stadium

1975 Ivy League football standings
	Conf.					Overall
Team	W		L		T	W		L		T
Harvard $	6	–	1	–	0	7	–	2	–	0
Brown	5	–	1	–	1	6	–	2	–	1
Yale	5	–	2	–	0	7	–	2	–	0
Dartmouth	4	–	2	–	1	5	–	3	–	1
Princeton	3	–	4	–	0	4	–	5	–	0
Penn	2	–	5	–	0	3	–	6	–	0
Columbia	2	–	5	–	0	2	–	7	–	0
Cornell	0	–	7	–	0	1	–	8	–	0
$ – Conference champion

The 1975 Brown Bears football team was an American football team that represented Brown University during the 1975 NCAA Division I football season. Brown finished second in the Ivy League.

In their third season under head coach John Anderson, the Bears compiled a 6–2–1 record and outscored opponents 258 to 168. Kevin Slattery and Paul Serrano were the team captains.

The Bears' 5–1–1 conference record placed second in the Ivy League standings, the team's best result since league play began in 1956. They outscored Ivy opponents 197 to 127.

Brown played its home games at Brown Stadium in Providence, Rhode Island.

== Schedule ==
Date	Opponent	Site	Result	Attendance	Source
September 27	Rhode Island*	Brown Stadium; Providence, RI (rivalry)	W 41–20	10,572	
October 4	at Penn	Franklin Field; Philadelphia, PA	W 17–8	14,275	
October 11	Yale	Brown Stadium; Providence, RI	W 27–12	14,532	
October 18	at Dartmouth	Memorial Field; Hanover, NH	T 10–10	10,300	
October 25	at Holy Cross*	Fitton Field; Worcester, MA	L 20–21	11,000	
November 1	at Princeton	Palmer Stadium; Princeton, NJ	W 24–16	17,500	
November 8	at Cornell	Schoellkopf Field; Ithaca, NY	W 45–23	10,000	
November 15	Harvard	Brown Stadium; Providence, RI	L 26–45	18,000	
November 22	Columbia	Brown Stadium; Providence, RI	W 48–13	8,150	
*Non-conference game

== Roster ==
1975 Brown Bears football team roster
Players
Coaches
Offense

Pos.	#	Name	Class
QB	6	John Anderson	Jr
QB	10	Bob Bateman	Sr

Defense

Pos.	#	Name	Class
LB	57	Tom Ford	Sr

Special teams

Pos.	#	Name	Class
K	9	Jose Violante	Sr

Head coach

- John Anderson

Coordinators/assistant coaches

Legend

- (C) Team captain
- (S) Suspended
- (I) Ineligible
- Injured
- Redshirt
