= 1974 Harvard Crimson football team =

American college football season

1974 Harvard Crimson football

Ivy League co-champion
- Conference: Ivy League
- Record: 7–2 (6–1 Ivy)
- Head coach: Joe Restic (4th season)
- Captain: Brian P. Hehir
- Home stadium: Harvard Stadium

1974 Ivy League football standings
	Conf.					Overall
Team	W		L		T	W		L		T
Harvard +	6	–	1	–	0	7	–	2	–	0
Yale +	6	–	1	–	0	8	–	1	–	0
Penn	4	–	2	–	1	6	–	2	–	1
Brown	4	–	3	–	0	5	–	4	–	0
Dartmouth	3	–	4	–	0	3	–	6	–	0
Princeton	3	–	4	–	0	4	–	4	–	1
Cornell	1	–	5	–	1	3	–	5	–	1
Columbia	0	–	7	–	0	1	–	8	–	0
+ – Conference co-champions

The 1974 Harvard Crimson football team was an American football team that represented Harvard University during the 1974 NCAA Division I football season. Harvard was co-champion of the Ivy League.

In their fourth year under head coach Joe Restic, the Crimson compiled a 7–2 record and outscored opponents 236 to 129. Brian P. Hehir was the team captain.

Harvard's 6–1 conference record tied for best in the Ivy League standings. The Crimson outscored Ivy opponents 191 to 91. Harvard shared the league title with Yale, despite beating the Bulldogs in the final game of the season.

Harvard played its home games at Harvard Stadium in the Allston neighborhood of Boston, Massachusetts.

== Schedule ==
Date	Opponent	Site	Result	Attendance	Source
September 28	Holy Cross*	Harvard Stadium; Boston, MA	W 24–14	17,500	
October 5	Rutgers*	Harvard Stadium; Boston, MA	L 21–24	11,000	
October 12	at Columbia	Baker Field; New York, NY	W 34–6	13,050	
October 19	Cornell	Harvard Stadium; Boston, MA	W 39–27	31,000	
October 26	at Dartmouth	Memorial Field; Hanover, NH (rivalry)	W 17–15	21,350	
November 2	Penn	Harvard Stadium; Boston, MA (rivalry)	W 39–0	17,000	
November 9	at Princeton	Palmer Stadium; Princeton, NJ (rivalry)	W 34–17	30,000	
November 16	Brown	Harvard Stadium; Boston, MA	L 7–10	16,000	
November 23	Yale	Harvard Stadium; Boston, MA (The Game)	W 21–16	40,500	
*Non-conference game
