= 1974 Dartmouth Big Green football team =

American college football season

1974 Dartmouth Big Green football
- Conference: Ivy League
- Record: 3–6 (3–4 Ivy)
- Head coach: Jake Crouthamel (4th season)
- Captains: Thomas Snickenberger; Brian Wroczynski
- Home stadium: Memorial Field

1974 Ivy League football standings
	Conf.					Overall
Team	W		L		T	W		L		T
Harvard +	6	–	1	–	0	7	–	2	–	0
Yale +	6	–	1	–	0	8	–	1	–	0
Penn	4	–	2	–	1	6	–	2	–	1
Brown	4	–	3	–	0	5	–	4	–	0
Dartmouth	3	–	4	–	0	3	–	6	–	0
Princeton	3	–	4	–	0	4	–	4	–	1
Cornell	1	–	5	–	1	3	–	5	–	1
Columbia	0	–	7	–	0	1	–	8	–	0
+ – Conference co-champions

The 1974 Dartmouth Big Green football team was an American football team that represented Dartmouth College during the 1974 NCAA Division I football season. Following a five-year run of consecutive Ivy League championships, the Big Green dropped to a tie for fifth place.

In their fourth season under head coach Jake Crouthamel, the Big Green compiled a 3–6 record and were outscored 115 to 103. Brian Wroczynski and Thomas Snickenberger were the team captains.

The Big Green's 3–4 conference record tied for fifth place in the Ivy League standings. Dartmouth outscored Ivy opponents 100 to 87.

Dartmouth played its home games at Memorial Field on the college campus in Hanover, New Hampshire. The college's sports teams had long been referred to as "the Green" or "Big Green", after their uniform colors, in addition to their primary nickname of "Dartmouth Indians". In 1974, the college trustees ruled "use of the [Indian] symbol in any form to be inconsistent with present institutional and academic objectives of the college in advancing Native American education.". The 1974 football season was the first in which the team used "Dartmouth Big Green" as its official nickname.

== Schedule ==
Date	Opponent	Site	Result	Attendance	Source
September 28	UMass*	Memorial Field; Hanover, NH	L 0–14	9,550	
October 5	at Holy Cross*	Fitton Field; Worcester, MA	L 3–14	18,000	
October 12	Princeton	Memorial Field; Hanover, NH	L 7–14	18,000	
October 19	at Brown	Brown Stadium; Providence, RI	W 7–6	10,500	
October 26	Harvard	Memorial Field; Hanover, NH (rivalry)	L 15–17	21,350	
November 2	at Yale	Yale Bowl; New Haven, CT	L 9–14	33,135	
November 9	Columbia	Memorial Field; Hanover, NH	W 21–0	10,100	
November 16	at Cornell	Schoellkopf Field; Ithaca, NY (rivalry)	W 21–9	12,000	
November 23	at Penn	Franklin Field; Philadelphia, PA	L 20–27	27,113	
*Non-conference game
