= 1974 Brown Bears football team =

American college football season

1974 Brown Bears football
- Conference: Ivy League
- Record: 5–4 (4–3 Ivy)
- Head coach: John Anderson (2nd season)
- Captains: M. Sokolowski; B. Taylor
- Home stadium: Brown Stadium

1974 Ivy League football standings
	Conf.					Overall
Team	W		L		T	W		L		T
Harvard +	6	–	1	–	0	7	–	2	–	0
Yale +	6	–	1	–	0	8	–	1	–	0
Penn	4	–	2	–	1	6	–	2	–	1
Brown	4	–	3	–	0	5	–	4	–	0
Dartmouth	3	–	4	–	0	3	–	6	–	0
Princeton	3	–	4	–	0	4	–	4	–	1
Cornell	1	–	5	–	1	3	–	5	–	1
Columbia	0	–	7	–	0	1	–	8	–	0
+ – Conference co-champions

The 1974 Brown Bears football team was an American football team that represented Brown University during the 1974 NCAA Division I football season. Brown finished fourth in the Ivy League.

In their second season under head coach John Anderson, the Bears compiled a 5–4 record but were outscored 152 to 141. M. Sokolowski and B. Taylor were the team captains.

The Bears' 4–3 conference record placed fourth in the Ivy League standings. They were outscored by Ivy opponents 92 to 86.

Brown played its home games at Brown Stadium in Providence, Rhode Island.

== Schedule ==
Date	Opponent	Site	Result	Attendance	Source
September 21	at Holy Cross*	Fitton Field; Worcester, MA	L 10–45	12,500	
September 28	Rhode Island*	Brown Stadium; Providence, RI (rivalry)	W 45–15	9,200	
October 5	Penn	Brown Stadium; Providence, RI	L 9–14	5,000	
October 12	at Yale	Yale Bowl; New Haven, CT	L 0–24	12,660	
October 19	at Dartmouth	Memorial Field; Hanover, NH	L 6–7	10,500	
November 2	Princeton^{†}	Brown Stadium; Providence, RI	W 17–13	10,000	
November 9	Cornell	Brown Stadium; Providence, RI	W 16–8	9,000	
November 16	at Harvard	Harvard Stadium; Boston, MA	W 10–7	16,000	
November 23	at Columbia	Baker Field; New York, NY	W 28–19	4,245	
*Non-conference game; ^{†}Homecoming

== Roster ==
1974 Brown Bears football team roster
Players			Coaches
Offense: Pos. / # / Name / Class; RB / / Paul Anderson / So	Defense: Pos. / # / Name / Class	Special teams: Pos. / # / Name / Class	Head coach: John Anderson; Coordinators/assistant coaches Legend: (C) Team captain; (S) Suspended; (I) Ineligible; Injured; Redshirt
