= 1975 Yale Bulldogs football team =

American college football season

1975 Yale Bulldogs football
- Conference: Ivy League
- Record: 7–2 (5–2 Ivy)
- Head coach: Carmen Cozza (11th season)
- MVP: John Smoot
- Captain: John Smoot
- Home stadium: Yale Bowl

1975 Ivy League football standings
	Conf.					Overall
Team	W		L		T	W		L		T
Harvard $	6	–	1	–	0	7	–	2	–	0
Brown	5	–	1	–	1	6	–	2	–	1
Yale	5	–	2	–	0	7	–	2	–	0
Dartmouth	4	–	2	–	1	5	–	3	–	1
Princeton	3	–	4	–	0	4	–	5	–	0
Penn	2	–	5	–	0	3	–	6	–	0
Columbia	2	–	5	–	0	2	–	7	–	0
Cornell	0	–	7	–	0	1	–	8	–	0
$ – Conference champion

The 1975 Yale Bulldogs football team represented Yale University in the 1975 NCAA Division I football season. The Bulldogs were led by 11th-year head coach Carmen Cozza, played their home games at the Yale Bowl and finished in third place in the Ivy League with a 5–2 record, 7–2 overall.

On November 22, 1975, Harvard and Yale entered "The Game" tied for first place with identical 5–1 records. The game was played at the Yale Bowl in front of 66,846 spectators. Yale took a 7–0 lead on a five-yard option run by quarterback Stone Phillips (later known for his work as a television news reporter). Harvard rallied with 10 points in the second half to win the game and become the 1975 Ivy League champion.

The team's statistical leaders included Stone Phillips with 969 passing yards, halfback Don Gesicki with 873 rushing yards and 42 points scored, and split end Gary Fencik (who later played 12 years in the NFL) with 729 receiving yards.

Linebacker John Smoot was the team captain and also received the Ted Blair Award as the team's most valuable player. Eight Yale players received first-team All-Ivy honors: Fencik, Gesicki, Smoot, defensive end Scott Keller, offensive tackle Charlie Palmer, offensive guard Victor Staffieri, punter Mike Southworth, and MB John Cahill.

One Yale player was selected in the 1976 NFL draft: Gary Fencik by the Miami Dolphins in the 10th round, 281st overall pick.

== Schedule ==
Date	Opponent	Site	Result	Attendance	Source
September 27	Connecticut*	Yale Bowl; New Haven, CT	W 35–14	18,900	
October 4	Colgate*	Yale Bowl; New Haven, CT	W 24–10	13,758	
October 11	at Brown	Brown Stadium; Providence, RI	L 12–27	14,532	
October 18	at Columbia	Baker Field; New York, NY	W 34–7	3,900	
October 25	Cornell	Yale Bowl; New Haven, CT	W 20–14	13,988	
November 1	Dartmouth	Yale Bowl; New Haven, CT	W 16–14	30,000	
November 8	Penn	Yale Bowl; New Haven, CT	W 24–14	18,740	
November 15	at Princeton	Palmer Stadium; Princeton, NJ (rivalry)	W 24–13	25,000	
November 22	Harvard	Yale Bowl; New Haven, CT (The Game)	L 7–10	66,846	
*Non-conference game

== Roster ==
1975 Yale Bulldogs football team roster
Players
Coaches
Offense

Pos.	#	Name	Class
RB	25	Glenn Baker	Jr
WR	85	Al Barker	Sr
FB	43	Keith Bassi	So
WR	22	Gary Fencik	Sr
RB	44	Ed Lewis	Jr

Defense

Pos.	#	Name	Class
LB	13	Jeff Knapp	So
LB	52	Jeff Waller	Jr
LB	37	Charlie Zupsic	Sr

Special teams

Pos.	#	Name	Class

Head coach

- Carmen Cozza

Coordinators/assistant coaches

Legend

- (C) Team captain
- (S) Suspended
- (I) Ineligible
- Injured
- Redshirt

== NFL draft ==
The following Bulldog was selected in the National Football League draft following the season.

Round	Pick	Player	Position	NFL team
10	281	Gary Fencik	DB	Miami Dolphins
