= 1974 Connecticut Huskies football team =

American college football season

1974 Connecticut Huskies football
- Conference: Yankee Conference
- Record: 4–6 (3–3 Yankee)
- Head coach: Larry Naviaux (2nd season)
- Offensive coordinator: Rich Johanningmeier (1st season)
- Home stadium: Memorial Stadium

1974 Yankee Conference football standings
	Conf.					Overall
Team	W		L		T	W		L		T
UMass +	4	–	2	–	0	5	–	6	–	0
Maine +	4	–	2	–	0	4	–	6	–	0
New Hampshire	3	–	3	–	0	5	–	4	–	0
Rhode Island	3	–	3	–	0	5	–	5	–	0
Boston University	3	–	3	–	0	5	–	4	–	1
Connecticut	3	–	3	–	0	4	–	6	–	0
Vermont	1	–	5	–	0	4	–	6	–	0
+ – Conference co-champions

The 1974 Connecticut Huskies football team represented the University of Connecticut in the 1974 NCAA Division II football season. The Huskies were led by second year head coach Larry Naviaux, and completed the season with a record of 4–6.

== Schedule ==
Date	Opponent	Site	Result	Attendance	Source
September 21	Vermont	Memorial Stadium; Storrs, CT	W 36–22	4,752–8,752	
September 28	at Yale*	Yale Bowl; New Haven, CT	L 7–20	37,382	
October 5	at New Hampshire	Cowell Stadium; Durham, NH	W 41–24	11,240	
October 12	No. 2 Delaware*	Memorial Stadium; Storrs, CT	L 6–15	13,695	
October 19	Maine	Memorial Stadium; Storrs, CT	L 0–7	11,305–11,350	
October 26	at UMass	Alumni Stadium; Hadley, MA (rivalry)	W 10–9	16,900	
November 2	at Rutgers*	Rutgers Stadium; Piscataway, NJ	W 9–7	12,500	
November 9	Boston University	Memorial Stadium; Storrs, CT	L 17–27	9,998	
November 16	Rhode Island	Memorial Stadium; Storrs, CT (rivalry)	L 13–14	11,270	
November 23	at Holy Cross*	Fitton Field; Worcester, MA	L 14–23	11,441	
*Non-conference game; Rankings from AP Poll released prior to the game
