= 1975 Dartmouth Big Green football team =

American college football season

1975 Dartmouth Big Green football
- Conference: Ivy League
- Record: 5–3–1 (4–2–1 Ivy)
- Head coach: Jake Crouthamel (5th season)
- Captains: Thomas Parnon; Reginald Williams
- Home stadium: Memorial Field

1975 Ivy League football standings
	Conf.					Overall
Team	W		L		T	W		L		T
Harvard $	6	–	1	–	0	7	–	2	–	0
Brown	5	–	1	–	1	6	–	2	–	1
Yale	5	–	2	–	0	7	–	2	–	0
Dartmouth	4	–	2	–	1	5	–	3	–	1
Princeton	3	–	4	–	0	4	–	5	–	0
Penn	2	–	5	–	0	3	–	6	–	0
Columbia	2	–	5	–	0	2	–	7	–	0
Cornell	0	–	7	–	0	1	–	8	–	0
$ – Conference champion

The 1975 Dartmouth Big Green football team was an American football team that represented Dartmouth College during the 1975 NCAA Division I football season. Dartmouth finished fourth in the Ivy League.

In their third season under head coach Jake Crouthamel, the Big Green compiled a 5–3–1 record and outscored opponents 160 to 121. Thomas Parnon and Reginald Williams were the team captains.

The Big Green's 4–2–1 conference record placed fourth in the Ivy League. Dartmouth outscored Ivy opponents 129 to 107.

Dartmouth played its home games at Memorial Field on the college campus in Hanover, New Hampshire.

== Schedule ==
Date	Opponent	Site	Result	Attendance	Source
September 27	at UMass*	Alumni Stadium; Hadley, MA	L 3–7	12,400	
October 4	Holy Cross*	Memorial Field; Hanover, NH	W 28–7	13,400	
October 11	Penn	Memorial Field; Hanover, NH	W 19–14	12,600	
October 18	at Brown	Brown Stadium; Providence, RI	T 10–10	10,300	
October 25	at Harvard	Harvard Stadium; Boston, MA (rivalry)	L 10–24	31,000	
November 1	at Yale	Yale Bowl; New Haven, CT	L 14–16	30,000	
November 8	at Columbia	Baker Field; New York, NY	W 22–17	5,165	
November 15	Cornell	Memorial Field; Hanover, NH (rivalry)	W 33–10	12,300	
November 22	at Princeton	Palmer Stadium; Princeton, NJ	W 21–16	15,000	
*Non-conference game
