= 1972 Middlebury Panthers football team =

American college football season

1972 Middlebury Panthers football

NESCAC champion
- Conference: New England Small College Athletic Conference
- Record: 8–0 (5–0 NESCAC)
- Head coach: John W. Anderson (4th season)
- Home stadium: Porter Field

The 1972 Middlebury Panthers football team, competing in the New England Small College Athletic Conference (NESCAC), represented Middlebury College during the 1972 NCAA College Division football season. The team had a strong season with notable players and a competitive record. In their fourth and final year under head coach John W. Anderson, the Panthers compiled a perfect 8–0 record, won the NESCAC championship, and outscored opponents by a total of 284 to 81. The most dominant win of the year was a 60-0 victory over Hamilton in which the Panthers tallied 475 rushing yards and scored nine rushing touchdowns. Middlebury's 1972 season was the second undefeated season in Middlebury's 80-year football history and the first since 1936.

Senior halfback and tri-captain Phil Pope led the team in rushing for the third consecutive year. For the 1971 season, he tallied 885 rushing yards and 112 points scored on 18 touchdowns and two two-point conversions. Pope, a geology major, set 11 single-season and career records and was named offensive player of the year in voting by College Division coaches in New England.

At quarterback, the team was led by juniors Doug Cramphin (547 passing yards, 148 rushing yards) and Peter Mackey (610 passing yards). Senior end Terry McGuirk was the leading receiver with 20 receptions for 284 yards. On defense, the team gave up only one touchdown pass and held opponents to an average of only 67 passing yards per game.

One month after the season ended, coach John Anderson left Middlebury to become the head football coach at Brown.

The team played its home games at Porter Field in Middlebury, Vermont.

== Schedule ==
Date	Opponent	Site	Result	Attendance	Source
September 23	at Bates	Lewiston, ME	W 42–7	2,200	
September 30	Wesleyan	Porter Field; Middlebury, VT	W 18–6	4,200	
October 7	WPI*^{†}	Porter Field; Middlebury, VT	W 28–20	2,500	
October 14	at Williams	Weston Field; Williamstown, MA	W 23–13	4,700	
October 21	at Hamilton	Clinton, NY	W 60–0	2,000	
October 28	RPI*	Porter Field; Middlebury, VT	W 29–21	3,000	
November 4	Norwich*	Porter Field; Middlebury, VT	W 49–0	3,100	
November 11	at Union (NY)	Alexander Field; Schenectady, NY	W 35–14	1,200-3,500	
*Non-conference game; ^{†}Homecoming

== Personnel ==
=== Players ===
- George Antonakos, linebacker
- Jim Barrington
- Bruce Bertkau, receiver
- Pete Brakeley
- Keith Brown
- Junior Coleman
- Dave Cook, line
- Frank Cooper, fullback
- Doug Cramphin, quarterback
- John Cruise, defensive back
- Kevin Donahue, line
- Jay Flickinger
- Bob Garvie, defensive back
- Goldberger, safety
- Mike Goldfarb, line
- Jack Goulet, defensive back
- Bob Hanbury
- Bob Keller, defensive back
- Jim Kelly, rover
- Pete Mackey, quarterback
- Terry McGuirk, receiver
- Tom McNeil, linebacker/rover
- Howard Meny, line
- Tom O'Connor, back
- Charlie O'Sullivan
- Phil Pope, halfback
- Tom Pepin, defensive back
- Bob Screen, defensive back
- Chip Shearer, line
- Mark Uppendahl, linebacker
- Dave Uryus, tackle
- Pete Viani
- Dave Webster
- Jimmy Williams, back
- Fred Zinober, rover

=== Coaches ===
- Head coach - John W. Anderson
- Assistant coaches - Charlie Brush (line)
