= 1974 Rhode Island Rams football team =

American college football season

1974 Rhode Island Rams football
- Conference: Yankee Conference
- Record: 5–5 (3–3 Yankee)
- Head coach: Jack Gregory (5th season)
- Home stadium: Meade Stadium

1974 Yankee Conference football standings
	Conf.					Overall
Team	W		L		T	W		L		T
UMass +	4	–	2	–	0	5	–	6	–	0
Maine +	4	–	2	–	0	4	–	6	–	0
New Hampshire	3	–	3	–	0	5	–	4	–	0
Rhode Island	3	–	3	–	0	5	–	5	–	0
Boston University	3	–	3	–	0	5	–	4	–	1
Connecticut	3	–	3	–	0	4	–	6	–	0
Vermont	1	–	5	–	0	4	–	6	–	0
+ – Conference co-champions

The 1974 Rhode Island Rams football team represented the University of Rhode Island in the 1974 NCAA Division II football season. They were led by fifth year head coach Jack Gregory and finished the season 5–5 overall and 3–3 in the Yankee Conference, placing in a four-way tie for third.

== Schedule ==
Date	Opponent	Site	Result	Attendance	Source
September 14	Temple*	Meade Stadium; Kingston, RI	L 7–38	4,812	
September 21	Northeastern*	Meade Stadium; Kingston, RI	W 48–36	2,642	
September 28	vs. Brown*	Brown Stadium; Providence, RI (rivalry)	L 15–45	9,200	
October 5	at Maine	Alumni Field; Orono, ME	L 19–29	4,900	
October 12	Vermont	Meade Stadium; Kingston, RI	W 14–0	5,212	
October 19	UMass	Meade Stadium; Kingston, RI	L 7–17	7,134	
October 26	Boston University	Meade Stadium; Kingston, RI	W 13–7	3,112	
November 2	at New Hampshire	Cowell Stadium; Durham, NH	L 14–29	9,912	
November 9	Bridgeport*	Meade Stadium; Kingston, RI	W 45–8	3,624	
November 16	Connecticut	Memorial Stadium; Storrs, CT (rivalry)	W 14–13	11,270	
*Non-conference game
