= 1975 Columbia Lions football team =

American college football season

1975 Columbia Lions football
- Conference: Ivy League
- Record: 2–7 (2–5 Ivy)
- Head coach: Bill Campbell (2nd season)
- Captains: Mike Delaney; Mike Yeager
- Home stadium: Baker Field

1975 Ivy League football standings
	Conf.					Overall
Team	W		L		T	W		L		T
Harvard $	6	–	1	–	0	7	–	2	–	0
Brown	5	–	1	–	1	6	–	2	–	1
Yale	5	–	2	–	0	7	–	2	–	0
Dartmouth	4	–	2	–	1	5	–	3	–	1
Princeton	3	–	4	–	0	4	–	5	–	0
Penn	2	–	5	–	0	3	–	6	–	0
Columbia	2	–	5	–	0	2	–	7	–	0
Cornell	0	–	7	–	0	1	–	8	–	0
$ – Conference champion

The 1975 Columbia Lions football team was an American football team that represented Columbia University during the 1975 NCAA Division I football season. Columbia tied for second-to-last in the Ivy League.

In their second season under head coach Bill Campbell, the Lions compiled a 2–7 record and were outscored 261 to 151. Mike Delaney and Mike Yeager were the team captains.

The Lions' 2–5 conference record tied for sixth in the Ivy League standings. Columbia was outscored 210 to 144 by Ivy opponents.

Columbia played its home games at Baker Field in Upper Manhattan, in New York City.

== Schedule ==
Date	Opponent	Site	Result	Attendance	Source
September 27	at Lafayette*	Fisher Field; Easton, PA	L 7–10	5,000	
October 4	Princeton	Baker Field; New York, NY	L 7–27	6,215	
October 11	at Harvard	Harvard Stadium; Boston, MA	L 30–35	11,000	
October 18	Yale^{†}	Baker Field; New York, NY	L 7–34	3,900	
October 25	at Rutgers*	Rutgers Stadium; Piscataway, NJ	L 0–41	7,000	
November 1	at Cornell	Schoellkopf Field; Ithaca, NY (rivalry)	W 42–19	11,000	
November 8	Dartmouth	Baker Field; New York, NY	L 17–22	5,165	
November 15	Penn	Baker Field; New York, NY	W 28–25	4,125	
November 22	at Brown	Brown Stadium; Providence, RI	L 13–48	8,150	
*Non-conference game; ^{†}Homecoming
