= Jake Crouthamel =

American football player, coach, and administrator (1938–2022)

Biographical details
- Born: June 27, 1938; Perkasie, Pennsylvania, U.S.
- Died: November 6, 2022 (aged 84); Hanover, New Hampshire, U.S.

Playing career
- 1957–1959: Dartmouth
- 1960: Boston Patriots
- Position: Halfback

Coaching career (HC unless noted)
- 1965–1970: Dartmouth (assistant)
- 1971–1977: Dartmouth

Administrative career (AD unless noted)
- 1978–2005: Syracuse

Head coaching record
- Overall: 41–20–2

Accomplishments and honors

Championships
- 3 Ivy (1971–1973)

Awards
- Third-team All-American (1958); Second-team All-Eastern (1958)

John Jacob Crouthamel (June 27, 1938 – November 6, 2022) was an American football player, coach, and college athletic director.

== Early life and education ==
Crouthamel was born in eastern Pennsylvania to Kathryn Apple and Russell Crouthamel, who ran the family business making men's trousers during the war. He attended Pennridge High School, where he played on a team that won 26 of 27 games in three years. He was an All-League athlete in football, track, and basketball, and was named the school's top athlete.

He graduated with a B.A. in history from Dartmouth College in 1960.

== Playing career ==
Crouthamel played as a two-way halfback position for the Dartmouth Big Green football team. He was an exceptional football player at Dartmouth, leading in rushing for three seasons, and was on a team that compiled a 19–6–2 record from 1957 to 1959, including Dartmouth's first Ivy League championship in 1958. Crouthamel was named a third-team All-American by the Newspaper Enterprise Association in 1958. He recorded 1,763 rushing yards, a total that stood as Dartmouth's record for over a decade and ranks sixth all-time as of 2022. He was a second-team selection on the All-Ivy 25th anniversary squad.

In 1960, Crouthamel was drafted by the Los Angeles Chargers, but signed with the Dallas Cowboys, becoming the first player signed by NFL's expansion Dallas Cowboys. He was the last player cut in the preseason by the Cowboys, and ended up playing with the AFL's Boston Patriots for one year in their inaugural season.

== Coaching career ==
Crouthamel spent three years in the US Navy and one year as football coach at Mercersburg Academy in Mercersburg, Pennsylvania.

=== Dartmouth football head coach ===
Crouthamel returned to Dartmouth as a member of Bob Blackman's coaching staff in 1965. When Blackman left in 1971 to become the head coach at the Illinois, Crouthamel took over. His teams compiled a record of 41–20–2 (.667) and won or shared three consecutive Ivy League championships (1971–73). He was named the New England and NCAA District I Coach of the Year in 1973. He resigned on November 3, 1977, to become the athletics director at Syracuse University.

=== Syracuse University athletic director ===
Crouthamel was named the ninth athletic director at Syracuse University in March 1978. He oversaw the construction and opening of the Carrier Dome, construction and expansion of the football wing at the Manley Field House, and improvement in women's athletics fostered by Title IX. During his tenure, Syracuse Orange teams won nine national championships (2003 national title in men's basketball and eight men's lacrosse championships), 12 football bowl appearances and 22 overall Big East conference championships. He hired successful football coaches Dick MacPherson and Paul Pasqualoni.

He played a key role in the formation of the Big East Conference in 1979. He served as conference president, a member of the NCAA Men's Basketball Committee, and a member of the BIG EAST television negotiating committee.

He retired from Syracuse University on June 30, 2005.

== Honors and awards ==
Crouthamel was recognized as an honorary Syracuse University Letterwinner of Distinction in 1995. In 1999, he was the third recipient of the John L. Toner Award for dedication to college athletics. In 2000, Jake Crouthamel was named the NACDA Division IA Northeast Region Athletics Director of the Year and received the Chancellor's Citation for Excellence in 2002. In 2007, he received the Eastern College Athletic Conference (ECAC) James Lynah Distinguished Achievement Award. In 2008, he was inducted into the National Association of Collegiate Directors of Athletics (NACDA) Hall of Fame. In 2009, Crouthamel was an honoree at the biennial Ivy League Football Players Association dinner which recognizes a former player from each of the eight Ivy schools who has become a leader in his chosen field. Crouthamel was inducted into the Greater Syracuse Sports Hall of Fame in 2018.

== Personal life and death ==
Crouthamel was married to Carol until his death, and they have two daughters. After retiring in 2005, the couple lived in Centerville, Massachusetts, until moving to Hanover, New Hampshire in 2013.

He died on November 6, 2022, at age 84.

== Head coaching record ==
Year	Team	Overall	Conference	Standing	Bowl/playoffs
Dartmouth Indians / Big Green (Ivy League) (1971–1977)
1971	Dartmouth	8–1	6–1	T–1st	
1972	Dartmouth	7–1–1	5–1–1	1st	
1973	Dartmouth	6–3	6–1	1st	
1974	Dartmouth	3–6	3–4	T–5th	
1975	Dartmouth	5–3–1	4–2–1	4th	
1976	Dartmouth	6–3	4–3	T–3rd	
1977	Dartmouth	6–3	4–3	T–3rd	
Dartmouth:		41–20–2	32–15–2		
Total:		41–20–2			
National championship Conference title Conference division title or championship game berth
