= 1975 Princeton Tigers football team =

American college football season

1975 Princeton Tigers football
- Conference: Ivy League
- Record: 4–5 (3–4 Ivy League)
- Head coach: Robert Casciola (3rd season)
- Captain: Edward E. Sheridan
- Home stadium: Palmer Stadium

1975 Ivy League football standings
	Conf.					Overall
Team	W		L		T	W		L		T
Harvard $	6	–	1	–	0	7	–	2	–	0
Brown	5	–	1	–	1	6	–	2	–	1
Yale	5	–	2	–	0	7	–	2	–	0
Dartmouth	4	–	2	–	1	5	–	3	–	1
Princeton	3	–	4	–	0	4	–	5	–	0
Penn	2	–	5	–	0	3	–	6	–	0
Columbia	2	–	5	–	0	2	–	7	–	0
Cornell	0	–	7	–	0	1	–	8	–	0
$ – Conference champion

The 1975 Princeton Tigers football team was an American football team that represented Princeton University during the 1975 NCAA Division I football season. Princeton finished fifth in the Ivy League.

In their third year under head coach Robert Casciola, the Tigers compiled a 4–5 record but outscored opponents 163 to 157. Edward E. Sheridan was the team captain.

Princeton's 3–4 conference record placed fifth in the Ivy League standings. The Tigers outscored Ivy opponents 132 to 128.

Princeton played its home games at Palmer Stadium on the university campus in Princeton, New Jersey.

== Schedule ==
Date	Opponent	Site	Result	Attendance	Source
September 27	Rutgers*	Palmer Stadium; Princeton, NJ (rivalry)	W 10–7	30,000	
October 4	at Columbia	Baker Field; New York, NY	W 27–7	6,215	
October 11	at Cornell	Schoellkopf Field; Ithaca, NY	W 16–8	15,000	
October 18	Colgate*	Palmer Stadium; Princeton, NJ	L 21–22	12,500	
October 25	Penn	Palmer Stadium; Princeton, NJ (rivalry)	L 20–24	12,500	
November 1	Brown	Palmer Stadium; Princeton, NJ	L 16–24	17,500	
November 8	at Harvard	Harvard Stadium; Boston, MA (rivalry)	W 24–20	23,000	
November 15	Yale	Palmer Stadium; Princeton, NJ (rivalry)	L 13–24	25,000	
November 22	Dartmouth	Palmer Stadium; Princeton, NJ	L 16–21	15,000	
*Non-conference game
