= 1974 Maine Black Bears football team =

American college football season

1974 Maine Black Bears football

Yankee Conference co-champion
- Conference: Yankee Conference
- Record: 4–6 (4–2 Yankee)
- Head coach: Walter Abbott (8th season)
- Home stadium: Alumni Stadium

1974 Yankee Conference football standings
| | Conf. | | | | | Overall |
| Team | W | | L | | T | W | | L | | T |
|---|---|---|---|---|---|---|---|---|---|---|
| UMass + | 4 | – | 2 | – | 0 | 5 | – | 6 | – | 0 |
| Maine + | 4 | – | 2 | – | 0 | 4 | – | 6 | – | 0 |
| New Hampshire | 3 | – | 3 | – | 0 | 5 | – | 4 | – | 0 |
| Rhode Island | 3 | – | 3 | – | 0 | 5 | – | 5 | – | 0 |
| Boston University | 3 | – | 3 | – | 0 | 5 | – | 4 | – | 1 |
| Connecticut | 3 | – | 3 | – | 0 | 4 | – | 6 | – | 0 |
| Vermont | 1 | – | 5 | – | 0 | 4 | – | 6 | – | 0 |
+ – Conference co-champions

The 1974 Maine Black Bears football team represented the University of Maine in the 1974 NCAA Division II football season. They were led by eighth-year head coach Walter Abbott and finished the season with an overall record of 4–6 and a 4–2 mark in the Yankee Conference. Maine shared the conference title with UMass.

== Schedule ==
| Date | Opponent | Site | Result | Attendance | Source |
|---|---|---|---|---|---|
| September 7 | Northeastern* | Alumni Stadium; Orono, ME | L 7–14 | 3,000 | |
| September 13 | at Boston University | Nickerson Field; Boston, MA | L 6–7 | 3,300 | |
| September 21 | UMass | Alumni Stadium; Orono, ME | L 0–42 | 2,400–3,000 | |
| September 28 | at Bucknell* | Memorial Stadium; Lewisburg, PA | L 18–30 | 2,500 | |
| October 5 | Rhode Island | Alumni Stadium; Orono, ME | W 29–19 | 4,900 | |
| October 12 | at New Hampshire | Cowell Stadium; Durham, NH | W 23–9 | 12,387–12,390 | |
| October 19 | at Connecticut | Memorial Stadium; Storrs, CT | W 7–0 | 11,305–11,350 | |
| October 26 | Lehigh* | Alumni Stadium; Orono, ME | L 26–35 | 3,300–5,000 | |
| November 2 | Vermont | Alumni Stadium; Orono, ME | W 31–27 | 1,700–2,900 | |
| November 9 | at No. 3 Delaware* | Delaware Stadium; Newark, DE | L 13–39 | 17,591–18,000 | |
*Non-conference game; Rankings from AP Poll released prior to the game
