= 1974 Princeton Tigers football team =

American college football season

1974 Princeton Tigers football
- Conference: Ivy League
- Record: 4–4–1 (3–4 Ivy League)
- Head coach: Robert Casciola (2nd season)
- Captain: Thomas H. Schalch
- Home stadium: Palmer Stadium

1974 Ivy League football standings
	Conf.					Overall
Team	W		L		T	W		L		T
Harvard +	6	–	1	–	0	7	–	2	–	0
Yale +	6	–	1	–	0	8	–	1	–	0
Penn	4	–	2	–	1	6	–	2	–	1
Brown	4	–	3	–	0	5	–	4	–	0
Dartmouth	3	–	4	–	0	3	–	6	–	0
Princeton	3	–	4	–	0	4	–	4	–	1
Cornell	1	–	5	–	1	3	–	5	–	1
Columbia	0	–	7	–	0	1	–	8	–	0
+ – Conference co-champions

The 1974 Princeton Tigers football team was an American football team that represented Princeton University during the 1974 NCAA Division I football season. Princeton tied for fifth in the Ivy League.

In their second year under head coach Robert Casciola, the Tigers compiled a 4–4–1 record and outscored opponents 188 to 160. Thomas H. Schalch was the team captain.

Princeton's 3–4 conference record tied for fifth in the Ivy League standings. The Tigers outscored Ivy opponents 149 to 130.

Princeton played its home games at Palmer Stadium on the university campus in Princeton, New Jersey.

== Schedule ==
Date	Opponent	Site	Result	Attendance	Source
September 28	Rutgers*	Palmer Stadium; Princeton, NJ (rivalry)	T 6–6	26,000	
October 5	Columbia	Palmer Stadium; Princeton, NJ	W 40–13	13,000	
October 12	at Dartmouth	Memorial Field; Hanover, NH	W 14–7	18,000	
October 19	Colgate*	Palmer Stadium; Princeton, NJ	W 33–24	20,000	
October 26	at Penn	Franklin Field; Philadelphia, PA (rivalry)	L 18–20	23,317	
November 2	at Brown	Brown Stadium; Providence, RI	L 13–17	10,000	
November 9	Harvard	Palmer Stadium; Princeton, NJ (rivalry)	L 17–34	30,000	
November 16	at Yale	Yale Bowl; New Haven, CT (rivalry)	L 6–19	29,548	
November 23	Cornell	Palmer Stadium; Princeton, NJ	W 41–20	12,500	
*Non-conference game
