= 1974 Cornell Big Red football team =

American college football season

1974 Cornell Big Red football
- Conference: Ivy League
- Record: 3–5–1 (1–5–1 Ivy)
- Head coach: Jack Musick (9th season)
- Captain: Bob Joehl
- Home stadium: Schoellkopf Field

1974 Ivy League football standings
	Conf.					Overall
Team	W		L		T	W		L		T
Harvard +	6	–	1	–	0	7	–	2	–	0
Yale +	6	–	1	–	0	8	–	1	–	0
Penn	4	–	2	–	1	6	–	2	–	1
Brown	4	–	3	–	0	5	–	4	–	0
Dartmouth	3	–	4	–	0	3	–	6	–	0
Princeton	3	–	4	–	0	4	–	4	–	1
Cornell	1	–	5	–	1	3	–	5	–	1
Columbia	0	–	7	–	0	1	–	8	–	0
+ – Conference co-champions

The 1974 Cornell Big Red football team was an American football team that represented Cornell University during the 1974 NCAA Division I football season. Cornell finished second-to-last in the Ivy League.

In its ninth and final season under head coach Jack Musick, the team compiled a 3–5–1 record and was outscored 193 to 183. Rick Johnson and Dan Malone were the team captains.

Cornell's 1–5–1 conference record placed seventh in the Ivy League standings. The Big Red was outscored 172 to 119 by Ivy opponents.

Cornell played its home games at Schoellkopf Field in Ithaca, New York.

== Schedule ==
Date	Opponent	Site	Result	Attendance	Source
September 28	Colgate*	Schoellkopf Field; Ithaca, NY (rivalry)	W 40–21	14,000	
October 5	Bucknell*	Schoellkopf Field; Ithaca, NY	W 24–0	10,000	
October 12	Penn	Schoellkopf Field; Ithaca, NY (rivalry)	T 28–28	14,000	
October 19	at Harvard	Harvard Stadium; Boston, MA	L 27–39	31,000	
October 26	Yale	Schoellkopf Field; Ithaca, NY	L 3–27	17,000	
November 2	at Columbia	Baker Field; New York, NY (rivalry)	W 24–0	5,180	
November 9	at Brown	Brown Stadium; Providence, RI	L 8–16	9,000	
November 16	Dartmouth	Schoellkopf Field; Ithaca, NY (rivalry)	L 9–21	12,000	
November 23	at Princeton	Palmer Stadium; Princeton, NJ	L 20–41	12,500	
*Non-conference game
