= 1975 Harvard Crimson football team =

American college football season

1975 Harvard Crimson football

Ivy League champion
- Conference: Ivy League
- Record: 7–2 (6–1 Ivy)
- Head coach: Joe Restic (5th season)
- Captain: Dan Jiggetts
- Home stadium: Harvard Stadium

1975 Ivy League football standings
	Conf.					Overall
Team	W		L		T	W		L		T
Harvard $	6	–	1	–	0	7	–	2	–	0
Brown	5	–	1	–	1	6	–	2	–	1
Yale	5	–	2	–	0	7	–	2	–	0
Dartmouth	4	–	2	–	1	5	–	3	–	1
Princeton	3	–	4	–	0	4	–	5	–	0
Penn	2	–	5	–	0	3	–	6	–	0
Columbia	2	–	5	–	0	2	–	7	–	0
Cornell	0	–	7	–	0	1	–	8	–	0
$ – Conference champion

The 1975 Harvard Crimson football team was an American football team that represented Harvard University during the 1975 NCAA Division I football season. A year after sharing the Ivy League crown, the Crimson won the championship outright in 1975.

In their fifth year under head coach Joe Restic, the Crimson compiled a 7–2 record and outscored opponents 216 to 133. Daniel M. Jiggetts was the team captain.

Harvard's 6–1 conference record placed first in the Ivy League standings, for the second year in a row. The Crimson outscored Ivy opponents 189 to 113.

Harvard played its home games at Harvard Stadium in the Allston neighborhood of Boston, Massachusetts.

== Schedule ==
Date	Opponent	Site	Result	Attendance	Source
September 27	Holy Cross*	Harvard Stadium; Boston, MA	W 18–7	11,000	
October 4	Boston University*	Harvard Stadium; Boston, MA	L 9–13	10,200	
October 11	Columbia	Harvard Stadium; Boston, MA	W 35–30	11,000	
October 18	at Cornell	Schoellkopf Field; Ithaca, NY	W 34–13	18,000	
October 25	Dartmouth	Harvard Stadium; Boston, MA (rivalry)	W 24–10	31,000	
November 1	at Penn	Franklin Field; Philadelphia, PA (rivalry)	W 21–3	17,256	
November 8	Princeton	Harvard Stadium; Boston, MA (rivalry)	L 20–24	23,000	
November 15	at Brown	Brown Stadium; Providence, RI	W 45–26	18,000	
November 22	at Yale	Yale Bowl; New Haven, CT (The Game)	W 10–7	66,846	
*Non-conference game
