= 1974 Columbia Lions football team =

American college football season

1974 Columbia Lions football
- Conference: Ivy League
- Record: 1–8 (0–7 Ivy)
- Head coach: Bill Campbell (1st season)
- Captains: Dick Cummings; Mike Telep
- Home stadium: Baker Field

1974 Ivy League football standings
	Conf.					Overall
Team	W		L		T	W		L		T
Harvard +	6	–	1	–	0	7	–	2	–	0
Yale +	6	–	1	–	0	8	–	1	–	0
Penn	4	–	2	–	1	6	–	2	–	1
Brown	4	–	3	–	0	5	–	4	–	0
Dartmouth	3	–	4	–	0	3	–	6	–	0
Princeton	3	–	4	–	0	4	–	4	–	1
Cornell	1	–	5	–	1	3	–	5	–	1
Columbia	0	–	7	–	0	1	–	8	–	0
+ – Conference co-champions

The 1974 Columbia Lions football team was an American football team that represented Columbia University during the 1974 NCAA Division I football season. Columbia finished last in the Ivy League.

In their first season under head coach Bill Campbell, the Lions compiled a 1–8 record and were outscored 258 to 81. Dick Cummings and Mike Telep were the team captains.

The Lions' winless (0–7) conference record was the worst in the Ivy League standings. Columbia was outscored 210 to 43 by Ivy opponents.

Columbia played its home games at Baker Field in Upper Manhattan, in New York City.

== Schedule ==
Date	Opponent	Site	Result	Attendance	Source
September 28	Lafayette*	Baker Field; New York, NY	L 0–15	3,491–3,500	
October 5	at Princeton	Palmer Stadium; Princeton, NJ	L 13–40	13,000	
October 12	Harvard^{†}	Baker Field; New York, NY	L 6–34	13,050	
October 19	at Yale	Yale Bowl; New Haven, CT	L 2–42	13,152	
October 26	Bucknell*	Baker Field; New York, NY	W 38–33	3,227	
November 2	Cornell	Baker Field; New York, NY (rivalry)	L 0–24	5,180	
November 9	at Dartmouth	Memorial Field; Hanover, NH	L 0–21	10,100	
November 16	at Penn	Franklin Field; Philadelphia, PA	L 3–21	8,259	
November 23	Brown	Baker Field; New York, NY	L 19–28	4,245	
*Non-conference game; ^{†}Homecoming
