= John W. Anderson (American football) =

American football player and coach (1933–1998)

Biographical details
- Born: January 6, 1933; Carlisle, Pennsylvania, U.S.
- Died: January 15, 1998 (aged 65); Palm Coast, Florida, U.S.

Playing career
- 1951–1953: Ursinus

Coaching career (HC unless noted)
- 1965–1967: Dartmouth (OL)
- 1968: Boston College (DL)
- 1969–1972: Middlebury
- 1973–1983: Brown

Head coaching record
- Overall: 81–50–3

Accomplishments and honors

Championships
- 1 Ivy (1976)

John W. Anderson (January 6, 1933 – January 15, 1998) was an American college football coach. He served as the head football coach at Middlebury College from 1969 to 1972 and at Brown University from 1973 to 1983, compiling career head coaching record of 81–50–3.

A native of Carlisle, Pennsylvania, Anderson was a standout guard at Ursinus College. After graduating, he spent two years in the United States Army. He was an assistant coach at Northern High School and Central Dauphin High School before breaking into the college ranks as the offensive line coach at Dartmouth. In 1968, he served as the defensive line coach at Boston College. From 1969 to 1972, he was head football coach at Middlebury College. He quickly turned around the program, recording a winning record in only his second season. In 1972, Middlebury finished the season with an 8–0 record. In 1973, he was named head coach at Brown University. In 1976, he led Brown to its first Ivy League conference championship. He left Brown in 1984 to work with the New England Institute of Technology in Florida. Anderson died of a heart attack on January 15, 1998, at his home in Palm Coast, Florida.

== Head coaching record ==
Year	Team	Overall	Conference	Standing	Bowl/playoffs
Middlebury Panthers (NCAA College Division independent) (1969–1972)
1969	Middlebury	2–6			
1970	Middlebury	5–3			
1971	Middlebury	6–2			
1972	Middlebury	8–0			
Middlebury:		21–11			
Brown Bears (Ivy League) (1973–1983)
1973	Brown	4–3–1	4–3	5th	
1974	Brown	5–4	4–3	4th	
1975	Brown	6–2–1	5–1–1	2nd	
1976	Brown	8–1	6–1	T–1st	
1977	Brown	7–2	5–2	2nd	
1978	Brown	6–3	5–2	2nd	
1979	Brown	6–3	5–2	2nd	
1980	Brown	6–4	4–3	T–3rd	
1981	Brown	3–7	2–5	T–5th	
1982	Brown	5–5	3–4	T–4th	
1983	Brown	4–5–1	4–2–1	T–3rd	
Brown:		60–39–3			
Total:		81–50–3			
National championship Conference title Conference division title or championship game berth
