= 1974 UMass Minutemen football team =

American college football season

1974 UMass Minutemen football

Yankee Conference co-champion
- Conference: Yankee Conference
- Record: 5–6 (4–2 Yankee)
- Head coach: Dick MacPherson (4th season)
- Home stadium: Alumni Stadium

1974 Yankee Conference football standings
	Conf.					Overall
Team	W		L		T	W		L		T
UMass +	4	–	2	–	0	5	–	6	–	0
Maine +	4	–	2	–	0	4	–	6	–	0
New Hampshire	3	–	3	–	0	5	–	4	–	0
Rhode Island	3	–	3	–	0	5	–	5	–	0
Boston University	3	–	3	–	0	5	–	4	–	1
Connecticut	3	–	3	–	0	4	–	6	–	0
Vermont	1	–	5	–	0	4	–	6	–	0
+ – Conference co-champions

The 1974 UMass Minutemen football team represented the University of Massachusetts Amherst in the 1974 NCAA Division II football season as a member of the Yankee Conference in NCAA Division II. The team was coached by Dick MacPherson and played its home games at Alumni Stadium in Hadley, Massachusetts. UMass finished the season with a record of 5–6 overall and 4–2 in conference play.

== Schedule ==
Date	Opponent	Site	Result	Attendance	Source
September 14	at Villanova*	Villanova Stadium; Philadelphia, PA	L 13–17	7,807	
September 21	at Maine	Alumni Stadium; Orono, ME	W 42–0	2,400–3,000	
September 28	at Dartmouth*	Memorial Field; Hanover, NH	W 14–0	9,500	
October 5	Vermont	Alumni Stadium; Hadley, MA	L 14–25	13,500	
October 12	Boston University	Alumni Stadium; Hadley, MA	W 21–14	11,100	
October 19	at Rhode Island	Meade Stadium; Kingston, RI	W 17–7	7,134	
October 26	Connecticut	Alumni Stadium; Hadley, MA (rivalry)	L 9–10	16,900	
November 2	at Colgate*	Andy Kerr Stadium; Hamilton, NY	L 34–42	4,000	
November 9	at Holy Cross*	Fitton Field; Worcester, MA	L 23–30	14,844	
November 16	New Hampshire	Alumni Stadium; Hadley, MA (rivalry)	W 27–17	11,300	
November 23	Boston College*	Alumni Stadium; Hadley, MA (rivalry)	L 8–70	15,000–15,900	
*Non-conference game
