= Kingsway Regional High School =

High school in Gloucester County, New Jersey, US

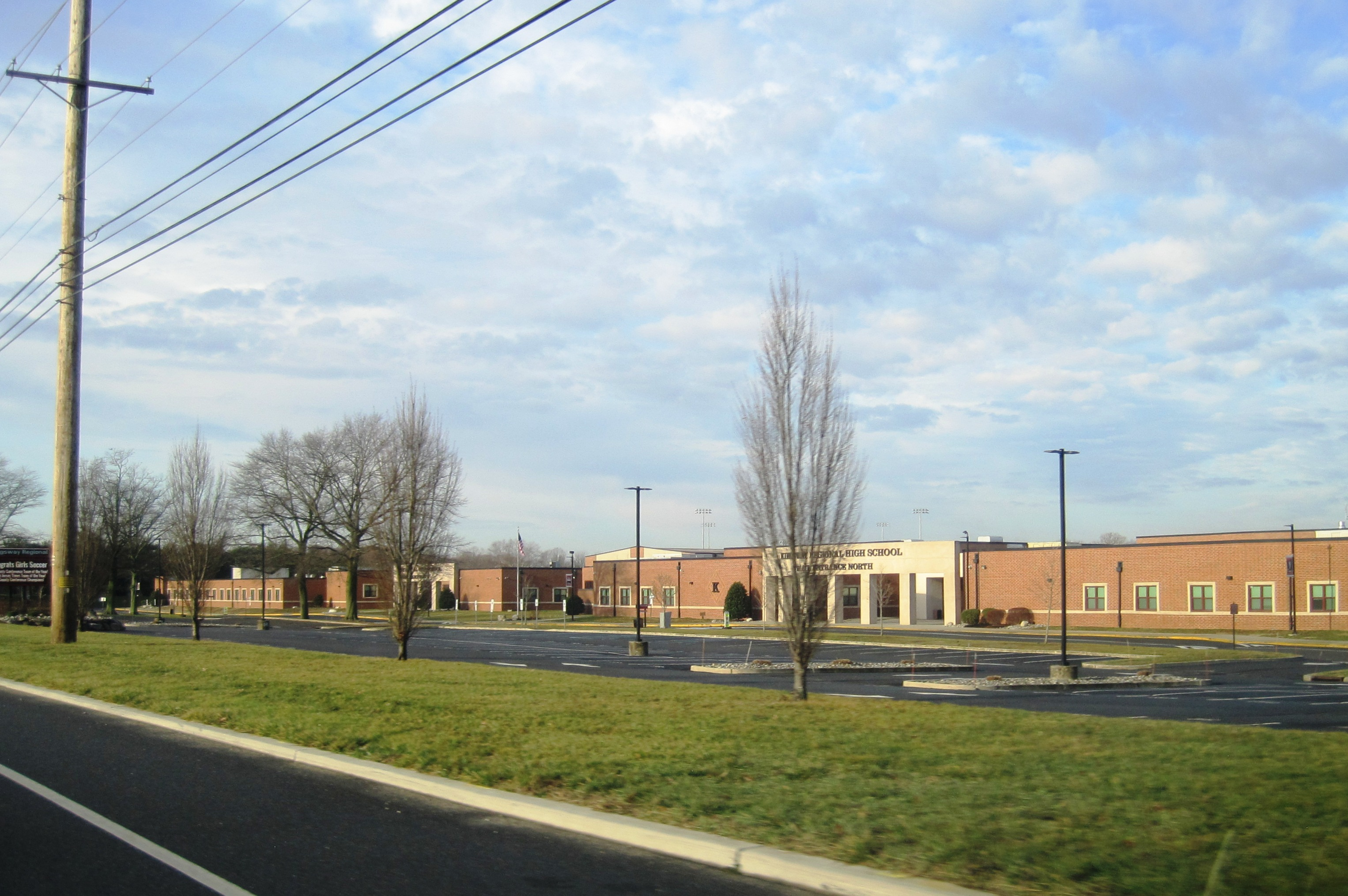

Location
- 201 Kings Highway; Woolwich Township, Gloucester County, New Jersey 08085; United States
- 39.762624°N 75.285691°W

Information
- Type: Public high school
- Motto: "Once a Dragon, Always a Dragon"
- Established: 1963
- NCES School ID: 340798002580
- Principal: Stefanie Fox-Manno
- Faculty: 131.0 FTEs
- Enrollment: 1,822 (as of 2024–25)
- Student to teacher ratio: 13.9:1
- Colors: Red and Black
- Athletics conference: Tri-County Conference (general); West Jersey Football League (football)
- Team name: Dragons
- Rivals: Clearview Regional High School; Delsea Regional High School
- Publication: Inside Kingsway
- Newspaper: The Flame
- Yearbook: Lancer
- Website: www.krsd.org/our-schools/high-school

Kingsway Regional High School is a four-year comprehensive public high school serving students in ninth through twelfth grade from five communities in Gloucester County, in the U.S. state of New Jersey, operating as part of the Kingsway Regional School District. The school serves students from East Greenwich Township, Logan Township, South Harrison Township, Swedesboro and Woolwich Township.

As of the 2024–25 school year, the school had an enrollment of 1,822 students and 131.0 classroom teachers (on an FTE basis), for a student–teacher ratio of 13.9:1. There were 324 students (17.8% of enrollment) eligible for free lunch and 74 (4.1% of students) eligible for reduced-cost lunch.

== History ==
Designed to accommodate an enrollment of 1,000 and constructed at a cost of $1.75 million (equivalent to $18.4 million in 2025), the school opened in September 1963 for students in grades 7–12, including students in grades 9–12 who had previously attended Swedesboro High School, which ended operations after 40 years. Prior to the school's opening, students had attended either Swedesboro High School or Woodstown High School.

== Awards, recognition and rankings ==
The school was the 150th-ranked public high school in New Jersey out of 339 schools statewide in New Jersey Monthly magazine's September 2014 cover story on the state's "Top Public High Schools", using a new ranking methodology. The school had been ranked 210th in the state of 328 schools in 2012, after being ranked 216th in 2010 out of 322 schools listed. The magazine ranked the school 218th in 2008 out of 316 schools. The school was ranked 202nd in the magazine's September 2006 issue, which surveyed 316 schools across the state. Schooldigger.com ranked the school 139th out of 381 public high schools statewide in its 2011 rankings (a decrease of 42 positions from the 2010 ranking) which were based on the combined percentage of students classified as proficient or above proficient on the mathematics (85.0%) and language arts literacy (93.5%) components of the High School Proficiency Assessment (HSPA).

== Athletics ==
The Kingsway Regional High School Dragons compete as one of the member schools in the Tri-County Conference, which is comprised of public and private high schools located in Camden, Cape May, Cumberland, Gloucester and Salem counties. The conference is overseen by the New Jersey State Interscholastic Athletic Association (NJSIAA). With 1,304 students in grades 10–12, the school was classified by the NJSIAA for the 2019–20 school year as Group IV for most athletic competition purposes, which included schools with an enrollment of 1,060 to 5,049 students in that grade range. The football team competes in the Continental Division of the 94-team West Jersey Football League superconference and was classified by the NJSIAA as Group V South for football for 2024–2026, which included schools with 1,333 to 2,324 students. Athletic rivals are Clearview Regional High School and Delsea Regional High School.

The girls spring track team was the Group I state champion in 1986.

In 1993, the boys' outdoor track team won South Jersey Group II sectional championship.

The boys' wrestling team won the Group II state championship in 1997 and 1998, the Group III title in 2007 and the Group IV championship in 2019; the team won the South Jersey Group II state sectional title in 1997, 1998, 2001 and 2002, the South Jersey Group III sectional championship in 2003, 2004, 2007 and the South Jersey Group IV title in 2017, 2019 and 2020 In 1997 and 1998, Kingsway won back-to-back Group II state championships in wrestling, in addition to a Group III title in 2007. The 2007 team won the South, Group III state sectional championship with a 62-6 win against Seneca High School. The team moved on to win the Group III Championship, defeating Warren Hills High School 55-15 in the semifinals and Ocean Township High School 33-28 in the tournament final. In 2017 the wrestling team defeated Hammonton High School 34-28 in the South Jersey Group IV Championship. In 2019, the wrestling team defeated Clearview Regional High School 47-16 in the South Jersey Group IV championship. The boys then went on and upset NJ.com No. 10 state powerhouse Phillipsburg High School 26-20 in the Group IV state championship, giving the Dragons' their fourth title in program history.

The Kingsway softball team won back-to-back Group II state championships, in 1998 (with a tournament final win vs. Mahwah High School) and 1999 (against Jefferson Township High School), becoming the first female team in school history to win state titles, and won the Group III title in 2008 (vs. John F. Kennedy Memorial High School). The 1998 team won the Group II title with a 4-0 win against Mahwah in the championship game. The team won the Group II title in 1999 against Jefferson Township with a 1-0 no-hitter in the championship game. In 2012 the softball team won the South Jersey Group III state sectional championship with a 2-0 win against Central Regional High School.

The 2001 football team won the South Jersey Group II state sectional title with a 16-14 win in the championship game against a Hammonton High School team that had defeated them three previous times in the sectional playoffs.

The field hockey team won the South Jersey Group III state sectional title in 2003, 2004 and 2011, and won the Group IV state title in 2022–2025. In 2003, the team won the South Jersey, Group III state sectional championship with a 1-0 win against Ocean City High School, the team's first-ever sectional title. The 2004 team repeated as sectional champions, defeating Ocean City High School again in the tournament final by a score of 1-0. In 2022, the Kingsway field hockey team ended Eastern Regional High School's 23-year streak by a score of 7-0 and went on to win the South Jersey Group IV sectional championship with a 10-0 victory against Toms River High School North in the tournament final. The team then went on to win the first field hockey state championship in school history with a 4-1 win over Hillsborough High School.

The girls' track team won the Group III state indoor relay championship in 2007 (as co-champion with Ridge High School), 2013 (co-champion with Winslow Township High School) and 2014; the boys' team won the indoor relay title in 2014, 2015 and 2020.

The boys' tennis team won the 2007 South Jersey Group III state sectional championship with a 4-1 win over Cumberland Regional High School.

The boys' cross-country team won the 2008 Group III Tri-County Championships.

The boys' basketball team won the South Jersey Group III championship for three straight years from 2009 to 2011. The program won its first state sectional title with a 58-42 win against Deptford Township High School in 2009 in the sectional final. The team repeated in 2010, by defeating Point Pleasant Boro High School by a score of 64-50. The team won its third consecutive title in 2011 by beating Manchester Township High School 49-48, becoming the first South Jersey team to win three consecutive titles since 1987, when Woodrow Wilson High School accomplished the feat.

The boys' cross country team won the Group III state championship in 2012, and won the Group IV title in 2017 and 2018. In 2012, the boys cross-country team won the Royal Division, Gloucester County Tournament, Tri-County Conference, South Jersey Group III sectional title and the Group III state championship, the first state title in program history. In 2017 and 2018 the boys' cross-country team won the Tri-County Conference Royal Division title, Tri-County Conference Showcase championship, Gloucester County Championship, Shore Coaches Invitational, South Jersey Group IV, and the State Group IV championship.

The boys' track team won the Group III indoor track championship in 2015 (as co-champion).

== Extracurricular activities ==
In November 2005, the Kingsway Dragon Marching Band became the Group II Champion at the Cavalcade of Bands championship at Hersheypark Stadium for its show based on the rock opera Tommy by The Who. The school's marching band achieved 3rd place in 2006 for their show, Jesus Christ Superstar, though outscoring their championship year by 5 points. They placed 5th in the higher-level competition (Group III) playing music based on the movie Gladiator, with their Color Guard in second place for best Color Guard.

From October to November 2011, the Kingsway Dragon Marching Band became Central New Jersey and State Champions under grouping of IA under the direction of Nicholas Kline. In November 2011, they placed second at Nationals held in Allentown, PA. Their show was based on the Broadway musical, Jekyll & Hyde. It was named "In His Eyes....the Madness of Hyde" portraying the irrational and wicked side of Mr. Hyde. More than half of the marching band were new members.

The school's marching band won the USBands Group II A national championship in 2015 with their program Voodoo in the Bayou.

The marching band was the Tournament of Bands Atlantic Coast Invitational Class A winner in Group 4 in 2018.

== Administration ==
The school's principal is Stefanie Fox-Manno. The core administration team includes the four assistant principals.

== Notable alumni ==
- George Burrell (born 1948), former American football safety who played for the Denver Broncos in 1969
- Dorien Bryant (born 1985), former college football wide receiver for the Purdue Boilermakers and Pittsburgh Steelers signatory, who attended, but did not graduate from Kingsway
- Mark Iwanowski (born 1955), former American football tight end who played in the NFL for the New York Jets
- Dan Meyer (born 1981, class of 1999), former Major League Baseball pitcher
- Anthony Potero, content creator and social media influencer
