= 1974 Yale Bulldogs football team =

American college football season

1974 Yale Bulldogs football

Ivy League co-champion
- Conference: Ivy League
- Record: 8–1 (6–1 Ivy)
- Head coach: Carmen Cozza (10th season)
- Home stadium: Yale Bowl

1974 Ivy League football standings
	Conf.					Overall
Team	W		L		T	W		L		T
Harvard +	6	–	1	–	0	7	–	2	–	0
Yale +	6	–	1	–	0	8	–	1	–	0
Penn	4	–	2	–	1	6	–	2	–	1
Brown	4	–	3	–	0	5	–	4	–	0
Dartmouth	3	–	4	–	0	3	–	6	–	0
Princeton	3	–	4	–	0	4	–	4	–	1
Cornell	1	–	5	–	1	3	–	5	–	1
Columbia	0	–	7	–	0	1	–	8	–	0
+ – Conference co-champions

The 1974 Yale Bulldogs football team represented Yale University in the 1974 NCAA Division I football season. The Bulldogs were led by tenth-year head coach Carmen Cozza, played their home games at the Yale Bowl and tied for first place in the Ivy League with a 6–1 record, 8–1 overall.

== Schedule ==
Date	Opponent	Site	Result	Attendance	Source
September 28	Connecticut*	Yale Bowl; New Haven, CT	W 20–7	37,382	
October 5	Colgate*	Yale Bowl; New Haven, CT	W 30–7	9,632	
October 12	Brown	Yale Bowl; New Haven, CT	W 24–0	12,660	
October 19	Columbia	Yale Bowl; New Haven, CT	W 42–2	13,152	
October 26	at Cornell	Schoellkopf Field; Ithaca, NY	W 27–3	17,000	
November 2	Dartmouth	Yale Bowl; New Haven, CT	W 14–9	33,135	
November 9	at Penn	Franklin Field; Philadelphia, PA	W 37–12	23,490	
November 16	Princeton	Yale Bowl; New Haven, CT (rivalry)	W 19–6	29,548	
November 23	at Harvard	Harvard Stadium; Boston, MA (The Game)	L 16–21	40,500	
*Non-conference game

== NFL draft ==
The following Bulldogs were selected in the National Football League draft following the season.

Round	Pick	Player	Position	NFL team
9	220	Greg Dubinetz	G	Cincinnati Bengals
14	362	Tom Doyle	QB	Oakland Raiders
15	375	Rudy Green	RB	Detroit Lions
17	432	Elvin Charity	DB	Cincinnati Bengals
