= Paul Kemp (American football) =

American football player and coach (1931–2014)

Biographical details
- Born: February 9, 1931; Waterloo, Iowa, U.S.
- Died: July 26, 2014 (aged 83); Lexington, Kentucky, U.S.

Playing career
- 1952–1953: Iowa
- Position: Quarterback

Coaching career (HC unless noted)
- 1956: Dickinson State
- 1957: Ball State (assistant)
- 1958–1966: Arizona State (OC)
- 1967: Iowa State (backfield)
- 1969–1972: Pittsburgh (assistant)
- 1973–1976: Boston University
- 1977: Iowa (OL)

Administrative career (AD unless noted)
- 1968: Atlanta Falcons (scout)

Head coaching record
- Overall: 20–26–1

Paul Clement Kemp (February 9, 1931 – July 26, 2014) was an American football player, coach, and scout. He served as the head football coach at Dickinson State College—now known as Dickinson State University—in 1956 and at the Boston University from 1973 to 1976, compiling a career college football record of 20–26–1. From 1951 to 1953, Kemp played quarterback at the University of Iowa, where he was a member of the Iowa Beta chapter of Sigma Alpha Epsilon fraternity.

Kemp was born on February 9, 1931, in Waterloo, Iowa. He died of pulmonary hypertension and leukemia, on July 26, 2014, in Lexington, Kentucky.

== Head coaching record ==
Year	Team	Overall	Conference	Standing	Bowl/playoffs
Dickinson State Savages (North Dakota Intercollegiate Conference) (1956)
1956	Dickinson State	4–2	4–2	T–2nd	
Dickinson State:		4–2	4–2		
Boston University Terriers (Yankee Conference) (1973–1976)
1973	Boston University	3–7	1–4	6th	
1974	Boston University	5–4–1	3–3	T–3rd	
1975	Boston University	5–6	1–4	T–4th	
1976	Boston University	3–7	2–3	T–3rd	
Boston University:		16–24–1	7–14		
Total:		20–26–1			
