= Larry Naviaux =

American football player and coach (1936–2021)

Biographical details
- Born: December 17, 1936; Lexington, Nebraska, U.S.
- Died: August 21, 2021 (aged 84)

Playing career
- 1956–1958: Nebraska
- Position: Halfback

Coaching career (HC unless noted)
- 1961–1963: Southwestern Louisiana (OB)
- 1964–1968: Boston University (OB)
- 1969–1972: Boston University
- 1973–1976: Connecticut

Head coaching record
- Overall: 37–45–1
- Bowls: 0–1

Accomplishments and honors

Championships
- 1 Yankee (1973)

Awards
- AFCA College Division Coach of the Year (1969)

Larry L. Naviaux (December 17, 1936 – August 21, 2021) was an American football player and coach. He served as the head football coach at Boston University from 1969 to 1972 and at the University of Connecticut from 1973 to 1976, compiling a career college football coaching record of 37–45–1. Naviaux played college football as a halfback from 1956 to 1958 at the University of Nebraska–Lincoln. Prior to taking over at Boston in 1969, Naviaux served as an assistant coach there as well as in Nebraska and Southwestern Louisiana.

Naviaux was born on December 17, 1936, in Lexington, Nebraska. He resided in Farmington, Connecticut, during his retirement. He died on August 21, 2021.

== Head coaching record ==
Year	Team	Overall	Conference	Standing	Bowl/playoffs
Boston University Terriers (NCAA College Division independent) (1969–1972)
1969	Boston University	9–2			L Pasadena
1970	Boston University	5–4			
1971	Boston University	3–7			
1972	Boston University	2–8			
Boston University:		19–21			
Connecticut Huskies (Yankee Conference) (1973–1976)
1973	Connecticut	8–2–1	5–0–1	1st	
1974	Connecticut	4–6	3–3	T–3rd	
1975	Connecticut	4–7	3–2	3rd	
1976	Connecticut	2–9	2–3	T–3rd	
Connecticut:		18–24–1	13–8–1		
Total:		37–45–1			
National championship Conference title Conference division title or championship game berth
