= Bill Campbell (business executive) =

American businessman and chairman (1940–2016)

- Born: William Vincent Campbell Jr. August 31, 1940; Homestead, Pennsylvania, U.S.
- Died: April 18, 2016 (aged 75); Palo Alto, California, U.S.
- Education: Columbia University (BA, MA)
- Board member of: Intuit; Apple Inc.

William Vincent Campbell Jr. (August 31, 1940 – April 18, 2016) was an American businessman and chairman of the board of trustees of Columbia University and chairman of the board of Intuit. He was VP of Marketing and board director for Apple Inc. and CEO for Claris, Intuit, and GO Corporation. Campbell coached, among others, Larry Page, Sergey Brin, Eric Schmidt, and Sundar Pichai at Google, Steve Jobs at Apple, Jeff Bezos at Amazon, Jack Dorsey and Dick Costolo at Twitter, and Sheryl Sandberg at Facebook.

== Early life and career ==
Son of a local school official, Campbell was born and raised in Homestead, Pennsylvania, near Pittsburgh. He attended Columbia University, where he played football under coach Buff Donelli from 1959 to 1961. In his senior year, he was named to the All-Ivy Team. He graduated in 1962 with a bachelor's degree in economics. He was a founder of the Old Blue Rugby Football Club, one of the leading amateur rugby clubs in America. In 1964, he obtained a master's degree in education from Teachers College, Columbia University. He was head coach of Columbia's football team, the Columbia Lions from 1974 to 1979. Prior to this he was an assistant at Boston College for six years. He met his first wife, the former Roberta Spagnola, while she was the assistant dean in charge of Columbia's undergraduate dormitories.

He joined J. Walter Thompson, the advertising agency, and then Kodak, where he rose to run Kodak's European film business. He was hired by John Sculley, became Apple's VP of Marketing, and then ran Apple's Claris software division. When Sculley refused to spin Claris off into an independent company, Campbell and much of the Claris leadership left. Since 1997, when Steve Jobs returned to Apple, Campbell was a corporate director on Apple's board of directors.

Campbell became CEO of GO Corporation, a startup pioneering a tablet computer operating system. After successfully selling GO Eo to AT&T Corporation in 1993, Campbell was CEO of Intuit from 1994 to 1998. Campbell announced that he would be retiring as the Chairman of the Board of Directors at Intuit starting January 2016.

Campbell was an adviser to a number of technology companies, and was elected chairman of the board of trustees at Columbia in 2005.

== Death and legacy ==
Campbell died of cancer on April 18, 2016, at the age of 75. He was survived by his wife, Eileen Bocci Campbell, his two children, and his three step children. On April 21, 2016 Apple announced that they would be delaying their earnings release until Tuesday April 26, 2016, for a memorial that Apple had held.

In his honor, the National Football Foundation has issued the William V. Campbell Trophy since 1990 to the college football player with the best combination of academic, athletic, and community service achievements.

Intuit presents the Bill Campbell Coach's Award to a select number of employees who excel in mentorship and growth, while promoting diversity and sense of community.

Eric Schmidt, Jonathan Rosenberg, and Alan Eagle co-wrote a book about Campbell: Trillion Dollar Coach: The Leadership Playbook of Silicon Valley’s Bill Campbell.

== Head coaching record ==
Year	Team	Overall	Conference	Standing	Bowl/playoffs
Columbia Lions (Ivy League) (1974–1989)
1974	Columbia	1–8	0–7	8th	
1975	Columbia	2–7	2–5	T–6th	
1976	Columbia	3–6	2–5	T–5th	
1977	Columbia	2–7	1–6	T–7th	
1978	Columbia	3–5–1	2–4–1	T–5th	
1979	Columbia	1–8	1–6	7th	
Columbia:		12–41–1	8–33–1		
Total:		12–41–1			
