= 1974 Delaware Fightin' Blue Hens football team =

American college football season

1974 Delaware Fightin' Blue Hens football

Lambert Cup

Camellia Bowl, L 14–54 vs. Central Michigan
- Conference: Independent
- Record: 12–2
- Head coach: Tubby Raymond (9th season)
- Offensive coordinator: Ted Kempski (7th season)
- Offensive scheme: Delaware Wing-T
- Base defense: 5–2
- Home stadium: Delaware Stadium

1974 NCAA Division II independents football records
	Conf.			Overall
Team	W	L	T	W		L		T
No. 1 Central Michigan ^		–		12	–	1	–	0
No. 6 UNLV ^		–		12	–	1	–	0
No. 4 Delaware ^		–		12	–	2	–	0
No. 8 Western Carolina ^		–		9	–	2	–	0
No. 9 Tennessee State		–		8	–	2	–	0
No. 12 Youngstown State ^		–		8	–	2	–	0
Santa Clara		–		7	–	3	–	0
Wayne State (MI)		–		7	–	3	–	0
Ball State		–		6	–	4	–	0
Kentucky State		–		6	–	4	–	0
Northeastern		–		6	–	4	–	0
Central State (OH)		–		6	–	5	–	0
Akron		–		5	–	5	–	0
Indiana State		–		5	–	5	–	0
Nevada		–		5	–	6	–	0
Portland State		–		5	–	6	–	0
American International		–		4	–	5	–	0
Eastern Michigan		–		4	–	6	–	1
Milwaukee		–		4	–	6	–	0
Northeast Louisiana		–		4	–	6	–	0
Eastern Illinois		–		3	–	6	–	1
Arkansas–Pine Bluff		–		3	–	5	–	0
Chattanooga		–		4	–	7	–	0
Nebraska–Omaha		–		3	–	7	–	0
Bucknell		–		2	–	8	–	0
Northern Michigan		–		0	–	10	–	0
^ – NCAA Division II playoff participant; Rankings from AP small college poll

The 1974 Delaware Fightin' Blue Hens football team represented the University of Delaware as an independent during the 1974 NCAA Division II football season. The Hens completed the 86th season of Delaware football. The Hens played their home games at Delaware Stadium in Newark, Delaware. The 1974 team was led by coach Tubby Raymond and finished the regular season with a 10–1 record to make the NCAA Division II playoffs. The Hens lost to Central Michigan, 54–14, in the Division II Championship Game, the Camellia Bowl.

== Schedule ==
Date	Opponent	Rank	Site	Result	Attendance	Source
September 14	at Akron		Rubber Bowl; Akron, OH	W 14–0	7,216	
September 21	The Citadel	No. 4	Delaware Stadium; Newark, DE	W 48–12	18,893	
September 28	New Hampshire	No. 4	Delaware Stadium; Newark, DE	W 34–10	19,388	
October 5	No. 5 McNeese State	No. 3	Delaware Stadium; Newark, DE	W 29–24	19,239	
October 12	at Connecticut	No. 2	Memorial Stadium; Storrs, CT	W 15–6	13,695	
October 19	at Lehigh	No. 3	Taylor Stadium; Bethlehem, PA (rivalry)	W 14–7	14,500	
October 26	at Temple	No. 2	Veterans Stadium; Philadelphia, PA	L 17–20	37,156–37,265	
November 2	Villanova	No. 3	Delaware Stadium; Newark, DE (rivalry)	W 49–7	22,091	
November 9	Maine	No. 3	Delaware Stadium; Newark, DE	W 39–13	17,591	
November 16	West Chester	No. 3	Delaware Stadium; Newark, DE (rivalry)	W 31–3	20,002	
November 23	Bucknell	No. 3	Delaware Stadium; Newark, DE	W 51–16	16,583	
November 30	No. 11 Youngstown State	No. 3	Delaware Stadium; Newark, DE (NCAA Division II Quarterfinal)	W 35–14	15,576	
December 7	vs. No. 2 UNLV	No. 3	Tiger Stadium; Baton Rouge, LA (Grantland Rice Bowl—NCAA Division II Semifinal)	W 49–11	3,500	
December 14	vs. No. 6 Central Michigan	No. 3	Hughes Stadium; Sacramento, CA (Camellia Bowl—NCAA Division II Championship Game)	L 14–54	14,137	
Rankings from AP Poll released prior to the game
