= 1974 Ball State Cardinals football team =

American college football season

1974 Ball State Cardinals football
- Conference: Independent
- Record: 6–4
- Head coach: Dave McClain (4th season)
- Home stadium: Ball State Stadium

1974 NCAA Division II independents football records
| | Conf. | | | Overall |
| Team | W | L | T | W | | L | | T |
|---|---|---|---|---|---|---|---|---|
| No. 1 Central Michigan ^ | | – | | 12 | – | 1 | – | 0 |
| No. 6 UNLV ^ | | – | | 12 | – | 1 | – | 0 |
| No. 4 Delaware ^ | | – | | 12 | – | 2 | – | 0 |
| No. 8 Western Carolina ^ | | – | | 9 | – | 2 | – | 0 |
| No. 9 Tennessee State | | – | | 8 | – | 2 | – | 0 |
| No. 12 Youngstown State ^ | | – | | 8 | – | 2 | – | 0 |
| Santa Clara | | – | | 7 | – | 3 | – | 0 |
| Wayne State (MI) | | – | | 7 | – | 3 | – | 0 |
| Ball State | | – | | 6 | – | 4 | – | 0 |
| Kentucky State | | – | | 6 | – | 4 | – | 0 |
| Northeastern | | – | | 6 | – | 4 | – | 0 |
| Central State (OH) | | – | | 6 | – | 5 | – | 0 |
| Illinois State | | – | | 6 | – | 5 | – | 0 |
| Akron | | – | | 5 | – | 5 | – | 0 |
| Illinois College | | – | | 4 | – | 4 | – | 0 |
| Indiana State | | – | | 5 | – | 5 | – | 0 |
| Nevada | | – | | 5 | – | 6 | – | 0 |
| Portland State | | – | | 5 | – | 6 | – | 0 |
| American International | | – | | 4 | – | 5 | – | 0 |
| Eastern Michigan | | – | | 4 | – | 6 | – | 1 |
| Milwaukee | | – | | 4 | – | 6 | – | 0 |
| Northeast Louisiana | | – | | 4 | – | 6 | – | 0 |
| Eastern Illinois | | – | | 3 | – | 6 | – | 1 |
| Arkansas–Pine Bluff | | – | | 3 | – | 5 | – | 0 |
| Chattanooga | | – | | 4 | – | 7 | – | 0 |
| Nebraska–Omaha | | – | | 3 | – | 7 | – | 0 |
| Bucknell | | – | | 2 | – | 8 | – | 0 |
| Northern Michigan | | – | | 0 | – | 10 | – | 0 |
^ – NCAA Division II playoff participant; Rankings from AP small college poll

The 1974 Ball State Cardinals football team was an American football team that represented Ball State University as an independent during the 1974 NCAA Division II football season. In its fourth season under head coach Dave McClain, the team compiled a 6–4 record. The team played its home games at Ball State Stadium in Muncie, Indiana.

Running back Dave Blake rushed for 1,125 yards. Rick Clark set a Ball State record with 643 receiving yards. Quarterback Eric Scott set a Ball State career record with a .54187 pass completion percentage.

== Schedule ==
| Date | Opponent | Site | Result | Attendance | Source |
|---|---|---|---|---|---|
| September 14 | Central Michigan | Ball State Stadium; Muncie, IN | L 17–24 | 11,318 | |
| September 21 | at Butler | Butler Bowl; Indianapolis, IN | W 45–0 | 8,538 | |
| September 28 | Akron | Ball State Stadium; Muncie, IN | L 21–26 | 15,219 | |
| October 5 | at No. 9 Indiana State | Memorial Stadium; Terre Haute, IN (Blue Key Victory Bell) | L 22–31 | 11,061 | |
| October 12 | Richmond^{†} | Ball State Stadium; Muncie, IN | W 38–23 | 14,351 | |
| October 19 | Youngstown State | Ball State Stadium; Muncie, IN | W 21–14 | 13,419 | |
| October 26 | at Eastern Michigan | Rynearson Stadium; Ypsilanti, MI | L 9–17 | 6,000 | |
| November 2 | at Middle Tennessee | Horace Jones Field; Murfreesboro, TN | W 43–14 | 3.800 | |
| November 9 | Northern Illinois | Ball State Stadium; Muncie, IN (rivalry) | W 31–21 | 10,127 | |
| November 16 | at Illinois State | Hancock Stadium; Normal, IL | W 18–7 | 2,500 | |
^{†}Homecoming; Rankings from small college AP Poll released prior to the game
