= Mark Iwanowski =

American football player (born 1955)

No. 85, 88
- Position: Tight end

Personal information
- Born: September 8, 1955 (age 71); Hazleton, Pennsylvania, U.S.
- Listed height: 6 ft 4 in (1.93 m)
- Listed weight: 230 lb (104 kg)

Career information
- High school: Kingsway Regional
- College: Penn
- NFL draft: 1978: undrafted

Career history
- Oakland Raiders (1978)*; New York Jets (1978)
- * Offseason or practice squad member only
- Stats at Pro Football Reference

Mark David Iwanowski (born September 8, 1955) is an American former professional football player who was a tight end for the New York Jets of the National Football League (NFL). He played college football for the Penn Quakers.
