= 1974 Akron Zips football team =

American college football season

1974 Akron Zips football
- Conference: Independent
- Record: 5–5
- Head coach: Jim Dennison (2nd season)
- Captain: Barry Eisom; Denny Hamad; Gary Yost
- Home stadium: Rubber Bowl

1974 NCAA Division II independents football records
| | Conf. | | | Overall |
| Team | W | L | T | W | | L | | T |
|---|---|---|---|---|---|---|---|---|
| No. 1 Central Michigan ^ | | – | | 12 | – | 1 | – | 0 |
| No. 6 UNLV ^ | | – | | 12 | – | 1 | – | 0 |
| No. 4 Delaware ^ | | – | | 12 | – | 2 | – | 0 |
| No. 8 Western Carolina ^ | | – | | 9 | – | 2 | – | 0 |
| No. 9 Tennessee State | | – | | 8 | – | 2 | – | 0 |
| No. 12 Youngstown State ^ | | – | | 8 | – | 2 | – | 0 |
| Santa Clara | | – | | 7 | – | 3 | – | 0 |
| Wayne State (MI) | | – | | 7 | – | 3 | – | 0 |
| Ball State | | – | | 6 | – | 4 | – | 0 |
| Kentucky State | | – | | 6 | – | 4 | – | 0 |
| Northeastern | | – | | 6 | – | 4 | – | 0 |
| Central State (OH) | | – | | 6 | – | 5 | – | 0 |
| Akron | | – | | 5 | – | 5 | – | 0 |
| Illinois College | | – | | 4 | – | 4 | – | 0 |
| Indiana State | | – | | 5 | – | 5 | – | 0 |
| Nevada | | – | | 5 | – | 6 | – | 0 |
| Portland State | | – | | 5 | – | 6 | – | 0 |
| American International | | – | | 4 | – | 5 | – | 0 |
| Eastern Michigan | | – | | 4 | – | 6 | – | 1 |
| Milwaukee | | – | | 4 | – | 6 | – | 0 |
| Northeast Louisiana | | – | | 4 | – | 6 | – | 0 |
| Eastern Illinois | | – | | 3 | – | 6 | – | 1 |
| Arkansas–Pine Bluff | | – | | 3 | – | 5 | – | 0 |
| Chattanooga | | – | | 4 | – | 7 | – | 0 |
| Nebraska–Omaha | | – | | 3 | – | 7 | – | 0 |
| Bucknell | | – | | 2 | – | 8 | – | 0 |
| Northern Michigan | | – | | 0 | – | 10 | – | 0 |
^ – NCAA Division II playoff participant; Rankings from AP small college poll

The 1974 Akron Zips football team represented Akron University in the 1974 NCAA Division II football season as an independent. Led by second-year head coach Jim Dennison, the Zips played their home games at the Rubber Bowl in Akron, Ohio. They finished the season with a record of 5–5 and were outscored by their opponents 162–197.

== Schedule ==
| Date | Opponent | Site | Result | Attendance | Source |
|---|---|---|---|---|---|
| September 7 | Central State (OH) | Rubber Bowl; Akron, OH | W 31–20 | 32,874 | |
| September 14 | Delaware | Rubber Bowl; Akron, OH | L 0–14 | 7,216 | |
| September 21 | at Marshall | Fairfield Stadium; Huntington, WV | L 7–17 | 10,782 | |
| September 28 | at Ball State | Ball State Stadium; Muncie, IN | W 26–21 | 15,219 | |
| October 5 | Tampa | Rubber Bowl; Akron, OH | L 7–16 | 10,092 | |
| October 12 | Northern Michigan | Rubber Bowl; Akron, OH | W 23–0 | 7,347 | |
| October 26 | at Kent State | Dix Stadium; Kent, OH (Wagon Wheel) | L 14–51 | 15,200 | |
| November 2 | at Indiana State | Memorial Stadium; Terre Haute, IN | W 22–21 | 7,856 | |
| November 9 | at Western Illinois | Hanson Field; Macomb, IL | W 32–7 | 11,409 | |
| November 16 | at Youngstown State | Rayen Stadium; Youngstown, OH (Steel Tire) | L 0–30 | 5,573 | |
