= 1974 Nevada Wolf Pack football team =

American college football season

1974 Nevada Wolf Pack football
- Conference: Independent
- Record: 5–6
- Head coach: Jerry Scattini (6th season)
- Home stadium: Mackay Stadium

1974 NCAA Division II independents football records
	Conf.			Overall
Team	W	L	T	W		L		T
No. 1 Central Michigan ^		–		12	–	1	–	0
No. 6 UNLV ^		–		12	–	1	–	0
No. 4 Delaware ^		–		12	–	2	–	0
No. 8 Western Carolina ^		–		9	–	2	–	0
No. 9 Tennessee State		–		8	–	2	–	0
No. 12 Youngstown State ^		–		8	–	2	–	0
Santa Clara		–		7	–	3	–	0
Wayne State (MI)		–		7	–	3	–	0
Ball State		–		6	–	4	–	0
Kentucky State		–		6	–	4	–	0
Northeastern		–		6	–	4	–	0
Central State (OH)		–		6	–	5	–	0
Akron		–		5	–	5	–	0
Indiana State		–		5	–	5	–	0
Nevada		–		5	–	6	–	0
Portland State		–		5	–	6	–	0
American International		–		4	–	5	–	0
Eastern Michigan		–		4	–	6	–	1
Milwaukee		–		4	–	6	–	0
Northeast Louisiana		–		4	–	6	–	0
Eastern Illinois		–		3	–	6	–	1
Arkansas–Pine Bluff		–		3	–	5	–	0
Chattanooga		–		4	–	7	–	0
Nebraska–Omaha		–		3	–	7	–	0
Bucknell		–		2	–	8	–	0
Northern Michigan		–		0	–	10	–	0
^ – NCAA Division II playoff participant; Rankings from AP small college poll

The 1974 Nevada Wolf Pack football team represented the University of Nevada, Reno as an independent during the 1974 NCAA Division II football season. Led by sixth-year head coach Jerry Scattini, the Wolf Pack compiled a record of 5–6. The team played home games at Mackay Stadium in Reno, Nevada.

== Schedule ==
Date	Opponent	Site	Result	Attendance	Source
September 7	San Francisco State	Mackay Stadium; Reno, NV	W 28–7	3,700	
September 14	at Sacramento State	Hornet Stadium; Sacramento, CA	W 31–7	3,000–3,750	
September 21	at Idaho State	ASISU Minidome; Pocatello, ID	L 7–13	10,800–11,000	
September 28	Portland State	Mackay Stadium; Reno, NV	W 19–14	4,000	
October 5	at No. 4 Boise State	Bronco Stadium; Boise, ID (rivalry)	L 16–36	14,258–14,500	
October 12	Cal State Northridge^{†}	Mackay Stadium; Reno, NV	W 19–14	5,100	
October 19	at Colorado State	Hughes Stadium; Fort Collins, CO	L 17–66	24,472	
October 26	Chico State	Mackay Stadium; Reno, NV	W 30–12	3,200	
November 2	at Cal Poly	Mustang Stadium; San Luis Obispo, CA	L 23–37	5,980	
November 9	Santa Clara	Mackay Stadium; Reno, NV	L 12–20	4,000–5,400	
November 16	at No. 2 UNLV	Las Vegas Stadium; East Las Vegas, NV (Fremont Cannon)	L 7–28	17,119–17,200	
^{†}Homecoming; Rankings from AP Poll released prior to the game
