= List of UCLA Bruins in the NFL draft =

This is a list of UCLA Bruins football players in the NFL draft.

== Key ==
B	Back	K	Kicker	NT	Nose tackle
C	Center	LB	Linebacker	FB	Fullback
DB	Defensive back	P	Punter	HB	Halfback
DE	Defensive end	QB	Quarterback	WR	Wide receiver
DT	Defensive tackle	RB	Running back	G	Guard
E	End	T	Offensive tackle	TE	Tight end

== Selections ==
Year	Round	Pick	Overall	Player	Team	Position
1936	2	8	17	Chuck Cheshire	Detroit Lions	B
1937	7	2	62	Fred Funk	Brooklyn Dodgers	B
1939	14	3	123	John Ryland	Cleveland Rams	C
1941	11	2	92	Jack Sommers	Chicago Cardinals	C
1941	14	6	126	Del Lyman	Green Bay Packers	T
1943	7	8	58	Ken Snelling	Green Bay Packers	B
1943	9	5	75	Al Solari	Cleveland Rams	B
1943	27	1	251	Chuck Fears	Detroit Lions	T
1944	5	10	42	Bob Waterfield	Los Angeles Rams	QB
1944	8	9	74	George Phillips	Philadelphia Eagles	B
1944	12	3	112	Jack Lescoulie	Detroit Lions	G
1944	20	7	204	Dave Brown	Washington Redskins	E
1944	23	4	234	Milt Smith	Philadelphia Eagles	E
1945	10	10	97	Vic Smith	New York Giants	B
1945	11	5	103	Tom Fears	Cleveland Rams	WR
1945	12	7	116	Jack Boyd	Chicago Bears	B
1945	13	9	129	Bill Chambers	Philadelphia Eagles	T
1945	22	2	221	Don Malmberg	Pittsburgh Steelers	B
1946	1	9	9	Cal Rossi	Washington Redskins	B
1946	5	10	40	Don Paul	Los Angeles Rams	C
1946	7	7	57	George Robotham	Philadelphia Eagles	E
1946	20	7	187	Don Malmberg	Detroit Lions	T
1946	22	5	205	Bill Stiers	New York Giants	B
1946	28	3	263	Bob Hansen	Pittsburgh Steelers	E
1946	30	6	286	Al Sparlis	Green Bay Packers	G
1947	1	4	4	Cal Rossi	Washington Redskins	B
1947	1	6	6	Ernie Case	Green Bay Packers	B
1947	3	7	20	Burr Baldwin	Green Bay Packers	E
1947	3	8	21	Don Paul	Los Angeles Rams	C
1947	8	3	58	Jerry Shipkey	Pittsburgh Steelers	B
1947	9	3	68	Roy Karrasch	Washington Redskins	E
1947	13	8	113	Mike Dimitro	Los Angeles Rams	G
1947	20	8	183	Bernie Reiges	Los Angeles Rams	B
1947	21	8	193	Leon McLaughlin	Los Angeles Rams	C
1948	5	8	33	Jack Myers	Philadelphia Eagles	B
1949	22	7	218	Bill Clements	Washington Redskins	E
1950	10	6	124	Bob Wilkinson	New York Giants	E
1950	10	13	131	Ernie Johnson	Philadelphia Eagles	B
1951	18	8	215	Bob Watson	New York Yanks	E
1951	24	8	287	Breck Stroschein	New York Yanks	E
1951	28	7	334	Howie Hansen	Pittsburgh Steelers	B
1952	14	10	167	Hal Mitchell	New York Giants	T
1952	19	6	223	Joe Marvin	Washington Redskins	B
1953	1	9	9	Donn Moomaw	Los Angeles Rams	C
1953	12	11	144	Chuck Doud	Los Angeles Rams	G
1953	19	11	228	Jack Ellena	Los Angeles Rams	T
1953	25	6	295	Ike Jones	Green Bay Packers	E
1953	25	9	298	Ernie Stockert	San Francisco 49ers	E
1953	28	1	326	Joe Sabol	Baltimore Colts	B
1954	4	7	44	Bill Stits	Detroit Lions	B
1954	8	6	91	Paul Cameron	Pittsburgh Steelers	B
1954	8	12	97	Milt Davis	Detroit Lions	B
1954	9	3	100	Pete O'Garra	New York Giants	E
1955	2	5	18	Bob Long	Los Angeles Rams	B
1955	2	11	24	Jim Salsbury	Detroit Lions	G
1955	11	6	127	Joe Ray	Los Angeles Rams	T
1956	10	8	117	Johnny Hermann	New York Giants	B
1956	11	11	132	Jim Decker	Los Angeles Rams	B
1956	12	9	142	Gil Moreno	Washington Redskins	T
1956	17	9	202	Tom Adams	Chicago Bears	E
1956	18	5	210	Jim Brown	Chicago Cardinals	G
1956	19	9	226	John Smith	Chicago Bears	B
1956	22	12	265	Sam Brown	Cleveland Browns	B
1956	25	12	301	Bob Davenport	Cleveland Browns	B
1956	26	3	304	Rommie Loudd	San Francisco 49ers	E
1956	26	11	312	Hardiman Cureton	Los Angeles Rams	T
1956	29	1	338	Doug Peters	Detroit Lions	B
1957	2	7	20	Don Schinnick	Baltimore Colts	LB
1957	3	12	37	Ronnie Knox	Chicago Bears	QB
1957	18	9	214	Hal Smith	Chicago Cardinals	B
1957	21	2	243	Pat Pinkston	Los Angeles Rams	E
1958	14	6	163	Bill Mason	Los Angeles Rams	B
1958	20	2	231	Jim Matheny	Chicago Cardinals	C
1958	23	9	274	Phil Parslow	Baltimore Colts	B
1958	26	1	302	Esker Harris	Green Bay Packers	G
1959	9	10	106	Kirk Wilson	Cleveland Browns	B
1959	13	5	149	Jim Steffen	Detroit Lions	B
1959	17	7	199	Bill Leeka	Pittsburgh Steelers	T
1959	24	6	282	Craig Chudy	San Francisco 49ers	E
1959	28	9	333	Rafer Johnson	Los Angeles Rams	B
1960	9	1	97	Marv Luster	Los Angeles Rams	E
1960	10	5	113	Paul Oglesby	St. Louis Cardinals	T
1961	1	6	6	Jimmy Johnson	San Francisco 49ers	DB
1961	1	11	11	Billy Kilmer	San Francisco 49ers	B
1961	7	4	88	Bobby Smith	Los Angeles Rams	B
1962	9	2	114	Marshall Shirk	Minnesota Vikings	T
1962	14	7	189	Andy Von Sonn	Chicago Bears	C
1962	20	2	268	Foster Andersen	Los Angeles Rams	T
1963	1	8	8	Kermit Alexander	San Francisco 49ers	DB
1963	9	1	113	Mel Profit	Los Angeles Rams	E
1964	8	3	101	Al Geverink	Dallas Cowboys	B
1964	14	14	196	Kent Francisco	Chicago Bears	T
1965	17	5	229	Mitch Johnson	Dallas Cowboys	T
1966	8	9	119	Dick Witcher	San Francisco 49ers	WR
1967	1	7	7	Mel Farr	Detroit Lions	RB
1967	9	5	216	John Richardson	Miami Dolphins	DT
1968	2	3	30	Gary Beban	Los Angeles Rams	QB
1968	11	12	285	Larry Slagle	St. Louis Cardinals	G
1968	17	1	436	Don Manning	Cincinnati Bengals	LB
1969	7	12	168	Larry Agajanian	Green Bay Packers	DT
1969	7	13	169	Ron Copeland	Chicago Bears	WR
1969	14	24	362	Harold Busby	Oakland Raiders	WR
1970	3	2	54	George Farmer	Chicago Bears	WR
1970	3	4	56	Mike Ballou	Boston Patriots	LB
1970	4	19	97	Wes Grant	New York Giants	DE
1970	5	25	129	Greg Jones	Minnesota Vikings	RB
1970	9	8	216	Bill Bolden	Cincinnati Bengals	RB
1970	9	23	231	Zenon Andrusyshyn	Dallas Cowboys	K
1970	10	24	258	Gordon Bosserman	Oakland Raiders	T
1970	14	22	360	Bob Geddes	Los Angeles Rams	LB
1971	10	19	253	Tim Oesterling	Oakland Raiders	DT
1971	14	16	354	Bruce Bergey	Kansas City Chiefs	DE
1972	4	11	89	Ed Galigher	New York Jets	DE
1972	4	22	100	Dave Dalby	Oakland Raiders	C
1972	5	21	125	Bob Christiansen	Los Angeles Rams	TE
1972	6	3	133	Bob Pifferini	Chicago Bears	LB
1973	5	3	107	Allan Ellis	Chicago Bears	DB
1973	5	22	126	Bruce Walton	Dallas Cowboys	T
1973	12	1	287	Brad Lyman	Houston Oilers	WR
1973	12	4	290	Bruce Barnes	New England Patriots	P
1973	13	20	332	John Smith	Dallas Cowboys	WR
1973	15	22	386	Reggie Echols	Green Bay Packers	WR
1974	1	10	10	Bill Sandifer	San Francisco 49ers	DT
1974	1	17	17	Fred McNeill	Minnesota Vikings	LB
1974	3	20	72	Cal Peterson	Dallas Cowboys	LB
1974	3	24	76	Al Oliver	Los Angeles Rams	T
1974	4	22	100	Jimmy Allen	Pittsburgh Steelers	DB
1974	6	18	148	James McAlister	Oakland Raiders	RB
1974	6	21	151	Jim Bright	Dallas Cowboys	DB
1974	7	10	166	Kermit Johnson	San Francisco 49ers	RB
1974	7	13	169	Efren Herrera	Detroit Lions	K
1974	11	21	281	Ed Kezirian	Cincinnati Bengals	T
1974	11	26	286	Gerry Roberts	Miami Dolphins	DE
1974	12	24	310	Roger Freberg	Los Angeles Rams	G
1975	6	2	132	Fulton Kuykendall	Atlanta Falcons	LB
1975	9	14	222	Eugene Clark	Pittsburgh Steelers	G
1975	15	20	384	Art Kuehn	Washington Redskins	C
1975	17	12	428	Myke Horton	New England Patriots	T
1976	2	13	41	Cliff Frazier	Kansas City Chiefs	DT
1976	2	14	42	Randy Cross	San Francisco 49ers	C
1976	4	11	103	John Sciarra	Chicago Bears	DB
1976	9	9	246	Phil McKinnely	Atlanta Falcons	T
1976	11	8	299	Norman Andersen	Chicago Bears	WR
1976	13	6	353	Terry Tautolo	Philadelphia Eagles	LB
1976	15	9	412	Brett White	Philadelphia Eagles	P
1976	15	27	430	Dale Curry	Dallas Cowboys	LB
1977	3	23	79	Wendell Tyler	Los Angeles Rams	RB
1977	4	1	85	Rick Walker	Cincinnati Bengals	TE
1977	12	11	318	Ray Burks	Kansas City Chiefs	LB
1978	3	22	78	Frank Corral	Los Angeles Rams	K
1978	7	3	169	Levi Armstrong	New York Jets	DB
1978	8	28	222	Homer Butler	Dallas Cowboys	WR
1978	12	24	330	Gus Coppens	Los Angeles Rams	T
1979	1	18	18	Manu Tuiasosopo	Seattle Seahawks	DT
1979	1	21	21	Jerry Robinson	Philadelphia Eagles	LB
1979	2	1	29	James Owens	San Francisco 49ers	WR
1979	2	7	35	Theotis Brown	St. Louis Cardinals	RB
1979	4	16	98	Johnnie Lynn	New York Jets	DB
1979	7	3	168	Max Montoya	Cincinnati Bengals	T
1979	11	19	294	Bruce Davis	Oakland Raiders	T
1980	3	12	68	Brent Boyd	Minnesota Vikings	C
1981	1	3	3	Freeman McNeil	New York Jets	RB
1981	1	4	4	Kenny Easley	Seattle Seahawks	DB
1981	5	18	129	Larry Lee	Detroit Lions	G
1981	9	22	243	Avon Riley	Houston Oilers	LB
1981	9	27	248	Curt Mohl	Oakland Raiders	T
1981	11	10	286	Rob DeBose	San Francisco 49ers	TE
1981	12	24	328	Jairo Penaranda	Los Angeles Rams	RB
1982	1	16	16	Luis Sharpe	St. Louis Cardinals	T
1982	3	7	62	Tim Wrightman	Chicago Bears	TE
1982	8	13	208	Martin Moss	Detroit Lions	DE
1982	9	26	249	Joe Gary	Dallas Cowboys	DT
1982	11	6	285	Ricky Coffman	Los Angeles Rams	WR
1983	3	3	59	Blanchard Montgomery	San Francisco 49ers	LB
1983	3	22	78	JoJo Townsell	New York Jets	WR
1983	3	25	81	Jim Turner	Cincinnati Bengals	DB
1983	5	26	138	Dokie Williams	Los Angeles Raiders	WR
1983	8	8	204	Irv Eatman	Kansas City Chiefs	T
1983	9	20	244	Blake Wingle	Pittsburgh Steelers	G
1983	10	16	267	Tom Ramsey	New England Patriots	QB
1984	1	18	18	Don Rogers	Cleveland Browns	DB
1984	3	27	83	Jay Schroeder	Washington Redskins	QB
1984	11	3	283	Frank Cephous	New York Giants	RB
1984	11	22	302	Steve Gemza	Seattle Seahawks	T
1984	12	11	319	Harper Howell	New England Patriots	TE
1984u	1	8	8	Paul Bergmann	Indianapolis Colts	TE
1984u	2	2	30	Kevin Nelson	Tampa Bay Buccaneers	RB
1984u	2	6	34	Lupe Sanchez	Kansas City Chiefs	DB
1984u	3	15	71	Doug West	Cleveland Browns	LB
1985	6	2	142	Steve Bono	Minnesota Vikings	QB
1985	6	21	161	Michael Young	Los Angeles Rams	WR
1985	7	1	169	Ron Pitts	Buffalo Bills	DB
1985	10	22	274	Duval Love	Los Angeles Rams	G
1985	11	17	297	Neal Dellocono	Dallas Cowboys	LB
1985	12	18	326	Herb Welch	New York Giants	DB
1986	1	18	18	Mike Sherrard	Dallas Cowboys	WR
1986	2	5	32	John Lee	St. Louis Cardinals	K
1986	3	19	74	Mark Walen	Dallas Cowboys	DT
1986	4	15	97	Tommy Taylor	San Diego Chargers	LB
1986	6	6	144	Robert Cox	Los Angeles Rams	T
1986	8	1	195	Steve Jarecki	Los Angeles Rams	LB
1986	11	14	291	David Norrie	Seattle Seahawks	QB
1987	7	17	185	Derek Tennell	Seattle Seahawks	TE
1987	8	5	200	Chuckie Miller	Indianapolis Colts	DB
1987	11	5	284	Joe Goebel	San Diego Chargers	C
1987	12	3	310	Marcus Greenwood	San Diego Chargers	RB
1988	1	14	14	Gaston Green	Los Angeles Rams	RB
1988	2	14	41	Ken Norton Jr.	Dallas Cowboys	LB
1988	2	19	46	Flipper Anderson	Los Angeles Rams	WR
1988	4	16	98	David Richards	San Diego Chargers	T
1988	5	22	131	Dennis Price	Los Angeles Raiders	DB
1988	5	28	137	James Washington	Los Angeles Rams	DB
1988	9	1	222	James Primus	Atlanta Falcons	RB
1988	9	27	248	Mel Farr Jr.	Denver Broncos	RB
1988	10	5	254	Paco Craig	Detroit Lions	WR
1988	12	12	317	Ben Hummel	Dallas Cowboys	LB
1989	1	1	1	Troy Aikman	Dallas Cowboys	QB
1989	2	6	34	Carnell Lake	Pittsburgh Steelers	DB
1989	2	7	35	Eric Ball	Cincinnati Bengals	RB
1989	2	25	53	Darryl Henley	Los Angeles Rams	DB
1989	4	10	94	Jim Wahler	Phoenix Cardinals	DT
1989	11	4	283	Marcus Turner	Kansas City Chiefs	DB
1989	12	19	326	Eric Smith	New York Giants	LB
1990	5	16	125	Charles Arbuckle	New Orleans Saints	TE
1990	6	6	143	Frank Cornish	San Diego Chargers	C
1990	8	15	208	Marvcus Patton	Buffalo Bills	LB
1990	10	17	265	Mike Lodish	Buffalo Bills	DT
1990	12	21	325	Kirk Maggio	Green Bay Packers	P
1991	1	2	2	Eric Turner	Cleveland Browns	DB
1991	2	4	31	Roman Phifer	Los Angeles Rams	LB
1991	8	4	199	Randy Austin	Atlanta Falcons	TE
1991	9	23	246	Scott Miller	Miami Dolphins	WR
1991	11	10	288	Rocen Keeton	New York Jets	LB
1992	1	25	25	Tommy Maddox	Denver Broncos	QB
1992	4	6	90	Dion Lambert	New England Patriots	DB
1992	5	1	113	Maury Toy	Indianapolis Colts	RB
1992	5	27	139	Matt Darby	Buffalo Bills	DB
1992	6	8	148	James Malone	Tampa Bay Buccaneers	LB
1992	7	17	185	Kevin Smith	Los Angeles Raiders	RB
1993	2	1	30	Carlton Gray	Seattle Seahawks	DB
1993	5	10	122	Sean LaChapelle	Los Angeles Rams	WR
1993	5	14	126	Kevin Williams	Denver Broncos	RB
1993	7	25	193	Othello Henderson	New Orleans Saints	DB
1994	1	10	10	Jamir Miller	Arizona Cardinals	LB
1994	2	8	37	Bruce Walker	Philadelphia Eagles	DT
1994	2	34	63	Vaughn Parker	San Diego Chargers	G
1994	5	12	143	Craig Novitsky	New Orleans Saints	G
1994	5	13	144	Marvin Goodwin	Philadelphia Eagles	DB
1995	1	10	10	J. J. Stokes	San Francisco 49ers	WR
1995	5	8	142	Carl Greenwood	New York Jets	DB
1996	1	4	4	Jonathan Ogden	Baltimore Ravens	T
1996	3	19	80	Karim Abdul-Jabbar	Miami Dolphins	RB
1996	3	29	90	Mike Flanagan	Green Bay Packers	C
1996	4	3	98	Donnie Edwards	Kansas City Chiefs	LB
1998	1	24	24	Shaun Williams	New York Giants	DB
1998	3	8	69	Skip Hicks	Washington Redskins	RB
1998	7	28	217	Chad Overhauser	Chicago Bears	G
1999	1	12	12	Cade McNown	Chicago Bears	QB
1999	3	13	74	Kris Farris	Pittsburgh Steelers	T
1999	3	23	84	Larry Atkins	Kansas City Chiefs	DB
2000	4	9	103	Danny Farmer	Pittsburgh Steelers	WR
2001	1	25	25	Freddie Mitchell	Philadelphia Eagles	WR
2002	1	31	31	Robert Thomas	St. Louis Rams	LB
2002	2	2	34	DeShaun Foster	Carolina Panthers	RB
2002	3	27	92	Marques Anderson	Green Bay Packers	DB
2002	5	12	147	Kenyon Coleman	Oakland Raiders	DE
2002	6	38	210	Bryan Fletcher	Chicago Bears	TE
2002	7	19	230	Jeff Grau	Washington Redskins	TE
2003	3	12	76	Mike Seidman	Carolina Panthers	TE
2003	3	18	82	Ricky Manning	Carolina Panthers	DB
2004	3	26	89	Matt Ware	Philadelphia Eagles	DB
2004	4	34	130	Brandon Chillar	St. Louis Rams	LB
2004	5	1	133	Dave Ball	San Diego Chargers	DE
2004	5	7	139	Rodney Leisle	New Orleans Saints	DT
2005	4	19	120	Manuel White	Washington Redskins	RB
2005	5	35	171	Ben Emanuel	Carolina Panthers	DB
2005	6	16	190	Tab Perry	Cincinnati Bengals	WR
2005	6	21	195	Craig Bragg	Green Bay Packers	WR
2006	1	28	28	Marcedes Lewis	Jacksonville Jaguars	TE
2006	2	28	60	Maurice Jones-Drew	Jacksonville Jaguars	RB
2006	7	20	228	Jarrad Page	Kansas City Chiefs	DB
2007	5	23	160	Justin Medlock	Kansas City Chiefs	K
2008	3	25	88	Bruce Davis	Pittsburgh Steelers	LB
2008	5	18	153	Matt Slater	New England Patriots	WR
2008	7	42	249	Christopher Horton	Washington Redskins	DB
2010	2	3	35	Brian Price	Tampa Bay Buccaneers	DT
2010	4	6	104	Alterraun Verner	Tennessee Titans	DB
2010	7	12	219	Terrence Austin	Washington Redskins	WR
2011	2	7	39	Akeem Ayers	Tennessee Titans	LB
2011	2	13	45	Rahim Moore	Denver Broncos	DB
2011	6	19	184	David Carter	Arizona Cardinals	DT
2013	1	26	26	Datone Jones	Green Bay Packers	DE
2013	4	28	125	Johnathan Franklin	Green Bay Packers	RB
2013	5	22	155	Jeff Locke	Minnesota Vikings	P
2013	6	28	196	Jeff Baca	Minnesota Vikings	G
2014	1	9	9	Anthony Barr	Minnesota Vikings	LB
2014	2	1	33	Xavier Su'a-Filo	Houston Texans	G
2014	4	8	108	Cassius Marsh	Seattle Seahawks	DE
2014	4	15	115	Shaq Evans	New York Jets	WR
2014	6	16	192	Jordan Zumwalt	Pittsburgh Steelers	LB
2015	2	13	45	Eric Kendricks	Minnesota Vikings	LB
2015	3	10	74	Owa Odighizuwa	New York Giants	DE
2015	5	11	147	Brett Hundley	Green Bay Packers	QB
2016	1	27	27	Kenny Clark	Green Bay Packers	DT
2016	2	5	36	Myles Jack	Jacksonville Jaguars	LB
2016	5	9	148	Caleb Benenoch	Tampa Bay Buccaneers	T
2016	5	10	149	Paul Perkins	New York Giants	RB
2016	5	15	154	Jordan Payton	Cleveland Browns	WR
2016	7	1	222	Aaron Wallace Jr.	Tennessee Titans	LB
2016	7	10	231	Thomas Duarte	Miami Dolphins	TE
2016	7	17	238	Devin Fuller	Atlanta Falcons	WR
2017	1	26	26	Takkarist McKinley	Atlanta Falcons	DE
2017	3	17	81	Fabian Moreau	Washington Redskins	DB
2017	3	24	88	Eddie Vanderdoes	Oakland Raiders	DT
2017	5	11	155	Jayon Brown	Tennessee Titans	LB
2017	6	28	211	Conor McDermott	New England Patriots	T
2018	1	10	10	Josh Rosen	Arizona Cardinals	QB
2018	1	15	15	Kolton Miller	Oakland Raiders	T
2018	4	22	122	Kenny Young	Baltimore Ravens	LB
2018	5	18	155	Scott Quessenberry	Los Angeles Chargers	G
2018	5	25	162	Jordan Lasley	Baltimore Ravens	WR
2019	7	40	254	Caleb Wilson	Arizona Cardinals	TE
2020	3	27	91	Devin Asiasi	New England Patriots	TE
2020	4	4	110	Darnay Holmes	New York Giants	DB
2020	4	6	112	Joshua Kelley	Los Angeles Chargers	RB
2021	3	11	75	Osa Odighizuwa	Dallas Cowboys	DT
2021	6	27	211	Demetric Felton	Cleveland Browns	WR
2022	3	16	80	Greg Dulcich	Denver Broncos	TE
2022	3	27	91	Sean Rhyan	Green Bay Packers	T
2022	5	17	160	Otito Ogbonnia	Los Angeles Chargers	DT
2022	5	20	163	Kyle Philips	Tennessee Titans	WR
2022	6	32	211	Quentin Lake	Los Angeles Rams	DB
2022	7	29	250	Brittain Brown	Las Vegas Raiders	RB
2023	2	21	52	Zach Charbonnet	Seattle Seahawks	RB
2023	4	20	122	Jon Gaines II	Arizona Cardinals	G
2023	5	5	140	Dorian Thompson-Robinson	Cleveland Browns	QB
2023	5	9	144	Atonio Mafi	New England Patriots	G
2024	1	15	15	Laiatu Latu	Indianapolis Colts	DE
2024	6	7	183	Darius Muasau	New York Giants	LB
2025	2	1	33	Carson Schwesinger	Cleveland Browns	LB
2025	2	20	52	Oluwafemi Oladejo	Tennessee Titans	LB
2025	6	29	205	Kain Medrano	Washington Commanders	LB
2025	7	1	217	Jay Toia	Dallas Cowboys	DT
2025	7	32	248	Moliki Matavao	New Orleans Saints	TE

== Notable undrafted players ==
Year	Player	Debut Team	Position	Notes
1972	Brian Goodman	OG	Dallas Cowboys	—
1974	Rich Baska	LB	Los Angeles Rams	—
1993	Arnold Ale	LB	Seattle Seahawks	—
1993	Mike Chalenski	DE	Philadelphia Eagles	—
1995	Wayne Cook	QB	San Francisco 49ers	—
1997	Travis Kirschke	DT	San Francisco 49ers	—
1999	Tod McBride	CB	Seattle Seahawks	—
1999	Ryan Neufeld	TE	Dallas Cowboys	—
2001	Jason Bell	CB	Dallas Cowboys	—
2001	Drew Bennett	WR	Tennessee Titans	—
2005	Chris Kluwe	P	Minnesota Vikings	—
2019	Andre James	C	Las Vegas Raiders	—
2022	Qwuantrezz Knight	CB	San Francisco 49ers	—
2024	Duke Clemens	C	Detroit Lions	—
2024	Alex Johnson	DB	New York Giants	—
2024	Carl Jones Jr.	LB	Chicago Bears	—
2024	Gabriel Murphy	OLB	Minnesota Vikings	—
2024	Grayson Murphy	DL	Miami Dolphins	—
2024	Carson Steele	RB	Kansas City Chiefs	—
2024	Colson Yankoff	TE	Washington Commanders	—
2025	Ethan Garbers	QB	Carolina Panthers	—
2025	Ale Kaho	LB	Washington Commanders	—
