= 1973 UCLA Bruins football team =

American college football season

1973 UCLA Bruins football
- Conference: Pacific-8 Conference

Ranking
- Coaches: No. 9
- AP: No. 12
- Record: 9–2 (6–1 Pac-8)
- Head coach: Pepper Rodgers (3rd season)
- Offensive coordinator: Homer Smith (2nd season)
- Offensive scheme: Wishbone
- Home stadium: Los Angeles Memorial Coliseum

1973 Pacific-8 Conference football standings
| | Conf. | | | | | Overall |
| Team | W | | L | | T | W | | L | | T |
|---|---|---|---|---|---|---|---|---|---|---|
| No. 8 USC $ | 7 | – | 0 | – | 0 | 9 | – | 2 | – | 1 |
| No. 12 UCLA | 6 | – | 1 | – | 0 | 9 | – | 2 | – | 0 |
| Stanford | 5 | – | 2 | – | 0 | 7 | – | 4 | – | 0 |
| Washington State | 4 | – | 3 | – | 0 | 5 | – | 6 | – | 0 |
| California | 2 | – | 5 | – | 0 | 4 | – | 7 | – | 0 |
| Oregon | 2 | – | 5 | – | 0 | 2 | – | 9 | – | 0 |
| Oregon State | 2 | – | 5 | – | 0 | 2 | – | 9 | – | 0 |
| Washington | 0 | – | 7 | – | 0 | 2 | – | 9 | – | 0 |
$ – Conference champion; Rankings from AP Poll

The 1973 UCLA Bruins football team represented the University of California, Los Angeles during the 1973 NCAA Division I football season. Members of the Pacific-8 Conference, the Bruins were led by third-year head coach Pepper Rodgers and played their home games at the Los Angeles Memorial Coliseum.

Quarterbacks Mark Harmon and John Sciarra ran the wishbone offense, and the Bruins were 9–2 overall and 6–1 on the Pac-8. After an opening loss at fourth-ranked Nebraska, the Bruins won nine straight, but lost again to USC in the season finale. UCLA repeated as conference runner-up, but the Pac-8 did not allow a second bowl team until the 1975 season. They were ranked twelfth in the final AP poll, ninth in the UPI coaches poll.

== Schedule ==
| Date | Time | Opponent | Rank | Site | TV | Result | Attendance | Source |
|---|---|---|---|---|---|---|---|---|
| September 8 | | at No. 4 Nebraska* | No. 10 | Memorial Stadium; Lincoln, NE | ABC | L 13–40 | 74,966 | |
| September 22 | | Iowa* | No. 18 | Los Angeles Memorial Coliseum; Los Angeles, CA | | W 55–18 | 34,546 | |
| September 29 | | at Michigan State* | No. 17 | Spartan Stadium; East Lansing, MI | | W 34–21 | 60,850 | |
| October 6 | | Utah* | No. 16 | Los Angeles Memorial Coliseum; Los Angeles, CA | | W 66–16 | 32,697 | |
| October 13 | 1:35 p.m. | at Stanford | No. 15 | Stanford Stadium; Stanford, CA | | W 59–13 | 55,000 | |
| October 20 | | at Washington State | No. 13 | Joe Albi Stadium; Spokane, WA | | W 24–13 | 32,200 | |
| October 27 | 3:00 p.m. | California | No. 13 | Los Angeles Memorial Coliseum; Los Angeles, CA (rivalry) | | W 61–21 | 35,492 | |
| November 3 | | Washington | No. 10 | Los Angeles Memorial Coliseum; Los Angeles, CA | | W 62–13 | 30,063 | |
| November 10 | | at Oregon | No. 9 | Autzen Stadium; Eugene, OR | | W 27–7 | 21,200 | |
| November 17 | | Oregon State | No. 8 | Los Angeles Memorial Coliseum; Los Angeles, CA | | W 56–14 | 18,540 | |
| November 24 | | at No. 9 USC | No. 8 | Los Angeles Memorial Coliseum; Los Angeles, CA (Victory Bell) | ABC | L 13–23 | 88,037 | |
*Non-conference game; Rankings from AP Poll released prior to the game; All times are in Pacific time

== Game summaries ==
=== at No. 4 Nebraska ===
No. 10 UCLA at No. 4 Nebraska

| Team | 1 | 2 | 3 | 4 | Total |
|---|---|---|---|---|---|
| No. 10 Bruins | 6 | 7 | 0 | 0 | 13 |
| • No. 4 Cornhuskers | 14 | 6 | 6 | 14 | 40 |

- Date: September 8, 1973
- Location: Memorial Stadium, Lincoln, Nebraska
- Game attendance: 74,966

=== Iowa ===
Iowa at No. 18 UCLA

| Team | 1 | 2 | 3 | 4 | Total |
|---|---|---|---|---|---|
| Hawkeyes | 10 | 0 | 0 | 8 | 18 |
| • No. 18 Bruins | 3 | 21 | 10 | 21 | 55 |

- Date: September 22, 1973
- Location:
  Los Angeles Memorial Coliseum
  Los Angeles, CA
- Game attendance: 34,456
- Source: Box Score

Scoring summary
| 1 | UCLA | Herrera 24-yard field goal | UCLA 3–0 |
| 1 | Iowa | Kokolus 45-yard field goal | Tied 3–3 |
| 1 | Iowa | Rollins 11-yard pass from Skogman (Kokolus kick) | Iowa 10–3 |
| 2 | UCLA | James McAlister 1-yard run (Herrera kick) | Tied 10–10 |
| 2 | UCLA | Harmon 1-yard run (Herrera kick) | UCLA 17–10 |
| 2 | UCLA | John Sciarra 2-yard run (Herrera kick) | UCLA 24–10 |
| 3 | UCLA | Kermit Johnson 9-yard run (Herrera kick) | UCLA 31–10 |
| 3 | UCLA | Herrera 44-yard field goal | UCLA 34–10 |
| 4 | UCLA | Tyler 4-yard run (Lantry kick) | UCLA 41–10 |
| 4 | Iowa | Skogman 5-yard run (Jenson pass from Skogman) | UCLA 41–18 |
| 4 | UCLA | Raymond Burks 46-yard pass from John Sciarra (Herrera kick) | UCLA 48–18 |
| 4 | UCLA | John Sciarra 7-yard run (Herrera kick) | UCLA 55–18 |

=== vs. No. 9 USC ===
No. 8 UCLA vs. No. 9 USC

| Team | 1 | 2 | 3 | 4 | Total |
|---|---|---|---|---|---|
| No. 8 Bruins | 3 | 7 | 0 | 3 | 13 |
| • No. 9 Trojans | 7 | 10 | 3 | 3 | 23 |

- Date: November 24, 1973
- Location: Los Angeles Memorial Coliseum
  Los Angeles, CA
- Game attendance: 88,037

Scoring summary
| 1 | | USC | Davis 4 yard run (Limahelu kick) | USC 7–0 |
| 1 | | UCLA | Herrera 42 yard field goal | USC 7–3 |
| 2 | | USC | McKay 16 yard pass from Haden (Limahelu kick) | USC 14–3 |
| 2 | | UCLA | Johnson 3 yard run (Herrera kick) | USC 14–10 |
| 2 | | USC | Limahelu 35 yard field goal | USC 17–10 |
| 3 | | USC | Limahelu 32 yard field goal | USC 20–10 |
| 4 | 4:30 | UCLA | Herrera 27 yard field goal | USC 20–13 |
| 4 | 1:07 | USC | Limahelu 28 yard field goal | USC 23–13 |

== Roster ==
- QB Mark Harmon
- PK Efrén Herrera
- RB Kermit Johnson
- FB James McAlister
- QB John Sciarra
- C Randy Cross
- OG Eugene Clark
- TE Gene Bleymaier
- FS Jim Bright
- LB Jack Jorgensen
- LB Terry Tautolo
- LB Fulton Kuykendall

== Awards and honors ==
- First Team All Americans: Jimmy Allen (DB), Efrén Herrera (K), Kermit Johnson (RB, Consensus selection), James McAlister (RB), Fred McNeill (DE)
- All Conference First Team: Jimmy Allen (DB), James Bright (DB), Kermit Johnson (RB), Ed Kezirian (OT), Steve Klosterman (OG), Fulton Kuykendall (LB), Fred McNeill (DE), John Nanoski (DB), Al Oliver (OT), Cal Peterson (DE)
