= Jim Bright =

Jim Bright may refer to:

- Jim Bright (psychologist), Australian organisational psychologist
- Jim Bright (American football) (born 1952), American football player
