= 1974 Rose Bowl =

American college football game

- 60th Rose Bowl Game
| Ohio State Buckeyes | USC Trojans |
| (9–0–1) | (9–1–1) |
| Big Ten | Pac-8 |
| 42 | 21 |
| Head coach: Woody Hayes | Head coach: John McKay |
| AP / Coaches; 4 / 3 | AP / Coaches; 7 / 7 |
| | 1 | 2 | 3 | 4 | Total |
|---|---|---|---|---|---|
| Ohio State | 7 | 7 | 13 | 15 | 42 |
| USC | 3 | 11 | 7 | 0 | 21 |
- Date: January 1, 1974
- Season: 1973
- Stadium: Rose Bowl
- Location: Pasadena, California
- MVP: Cornelius Greene (QB, OSU)
- Favorite: Ohio State by 2 points
- Referee: Howard Wirtz (Big Ten; split crew: Big Ten, Pac-8)
- Attendance: 105,267

United States TV coverage
- Network: NBC
- Announcers: Curt Gowdy, Al DeRogatis
- Nielsen ratings: 30.7

The 1974 Rose Bowl was the 60th edition of the college football bowl game, played at the Rose Bowl in Pasadena, California, on Tuesday, January 1. The Ohio State Buckeyes of the Big Ten Conference defeated the USC Trojans of the Pacific-8 Conference, 42–21. Sophomore quarterback Cornelius Greene of Ohio State was named Player of the Game. This was the sole win for the Big Ten in the Rose Bowl in the 1970s.

== Teams ==
=== Ohio State ===
The Ohio State Buckeyes began the 1973 season ranked third and went undefeated, with a tie. They were led by tailback Archie Griffin on offense and a defense that held its opponents to less than 100 yards per game of total offense. Going into the showdown at #4 Michigan, they had risen to #1 by outscoring their first nine opponents 361–33, including three straight shutouts of Northwestern, Illinois, and Michigan State.

The Buckeyes and Wolverines then battled to a 10–10 tie, making it uncertain who would win the vote among Big Ten athletic directors to determine the league's Rose Bowl representative. Although the Big Ten had done away with its "no repeat" rule a year earlier, many projected that Michigan would win the vote since Ohio State had gone to Pasadena the prior year. But Michigan starting quarterback Dennis Franklin had broken his collarbone late in the Ohio State game; perhaps influenced by the injury, the athletic directors voted 6–4 to send Ohio State to the Rose Bowl. Michigan head coach Bo Schembechler called it a gross injustice.

=== USC ===
USC was the defending national champion and began the season ranked first. But a 7–7 tie vs. Oklahoma and a 23–14 loss to Notre Dame dropped the Trojans to #9. They then needed a miracle comeback to beat Stanford 27–26, getting a touchdown and field goal sandwiched around an onside kick in the last minute of the game. They went into the Rose Bowl decider as a slight underdog against #8 UCLA, but forced six turnovers and knocked off the Bruins 23–13.

== Scoring summary ==
=== First quarter ===
- USC – Chris Limahelu, 47-yard field goal
- OSU - Pete Johnson, 1-yard run (Blair Conway kick)

=== Second quarter ===
- USC - Limahelu, 42-yard field goal
- USC - J.K. McKay, 10-yard pass from Anthony Davis (Pat Haden pass to McKay 2-point conversion)
- OSU – Johnson, 1-yard run (Conway kick)

=== Third quarter ===
- USC - Davis, 1-yard run (Limahelu kick)
- OSU - Johnson 4-yard run (kick blocked)
- OSU - Cornelius Greene, 1-yard run (Conway kick)

=== Fourth quarter ===
- OSU - Bruce Elia, 2-yard run, (Greene run 2-point conversion)
- OSU - Archie Griffin, 47-yard run (Conway kick)

== Game notes ==
Similar to the previous year, the game was tied at halftime, then dominated by the victor in the second half. USC regained the lead briefly at 21–14 early in the third quarter, then Ohio State scored four unanswered touchdowns to win 42–21.

Kicker Chris Limahelu's 47-yard field goal was the longest ever by a Trojan, breaking a 64-year-old record (Limahelu died of prostate cancer in 2010 at age 59). This was the last time Ohio State defeated USC until 2017 in the Cotton Bowl. The Trojans won the next seven meetings from 1974 to 2009, including three Rose Bowls (January 1975, 1980, 1985).

This was the second of three consecutive Rose Bowls involving these two teams, and USC won the other two. Ohio State stopped a four-game winning streak by the Pac-8 (now Pac-12), but the next Big Ten victories were seven and fourteen years away. The Buckeyes' next Rose Bowl win came in January 1997, stopping previously undefeated Arizona State.
