= 1973 Washington State Cougars football team =

American college football season

1973 Washington State Cougars football
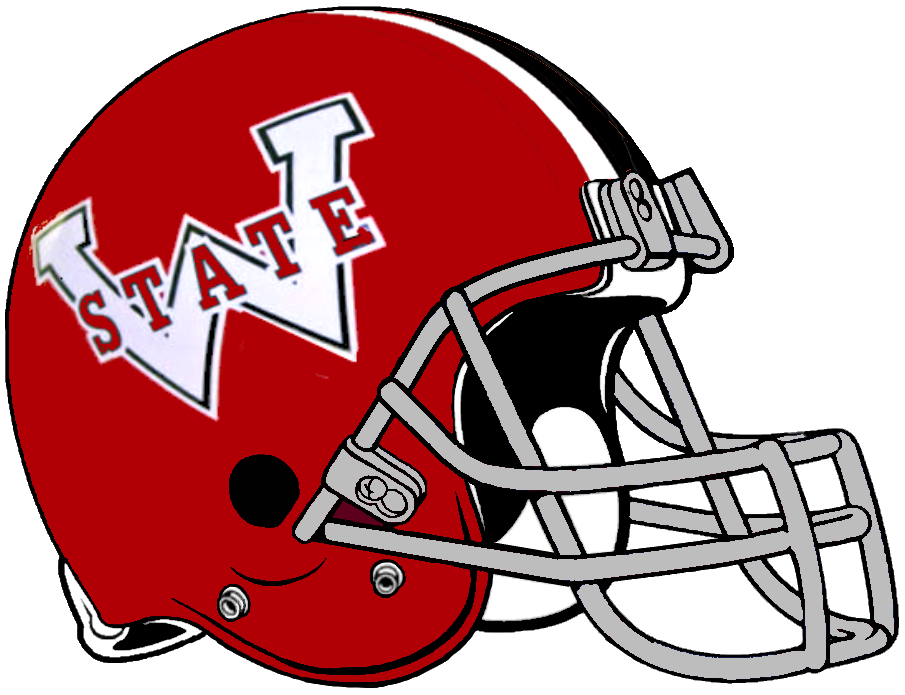
- Conference: Pacific-8 Conference
- Record: 5–6 (4–3 Pac-8)
- Head coach: Jim Sweeney (6th season)
- Offensive coordinator: Joe Tiller (3rd season)
- Defensive coordinator: Ray Braun (2nd season)
- Captains: Greg Craighead; Tom Poe
- Home stadium: Martin Stadium; Joe Albi Stadium

1973 Pacific-8 Conference football standings
	Conf.					Overall
Team	W		L		T	W		L		T
No. 8 USC $	7	–	0	–	0	9	–	2	–	1
No. 12 UCLA	6	–	1	–	0	9	–	2	–	0
Stanford	5	–	2	–	0	7	–	4	–	0
Washington State	4	–	3	–	0	5	–	6	–	0
California	2	–	5	–	0	4	–	7	–	0
Oregon	2	–	5	–	0	2	–	9	–	0
Oregon State	2	–	5	–	0	2	–	9	–	0
Washington	0	–	7	–	0	2	–	9	–	0
$ – Conference champion; Rankings from AP Poll

The 1973 Washington State Cougars football team was an American football team that represented Washington State University in the Pacific-8 Conference (Pac-8) during the 1973 NCAA Division I football season. In their sixth season under head coach Jim Sweeney, the Cougars compiled a 5–6 record (4–3 in Pac-8, fourth), and were outscored 290 to 250.

The team's statistical leaders included Chuck Peck with 1,023 passing yards, Andrew Jones with 1,059 rushing yards, and Tim Krause with 384 receiving yards.

The Cougars won their last four games, all in conference, which included a sweep of the three Northwest teams; the season concluded with a second consecutive win in the Apple Cup over Washington, this time a 52–26 rout on the road in Seattle.

== Schedule ==
Date	Time	Opponent	Site	Result	Attendance	Source
September 15	11:30 a.m.	at Kansas*	Memorial Stadium; Lawrence, KS	L 8–29	39,750	
September 22	7:30 p.m.	at No. 13 Arizona State*	Sun Devil Stadium; Tempe, AZ	L 9–20	51,252	
September 29	1:30 p.m.	Idaho*	Martin Stadium; Pullman, WA (Battle of the Palouse)	W 51–24	22,500	
October 6	10:30 a.m.	at No. 1 Ohio State*	Ohio Stadium; Columbus, OH	L 3–27	87,425	
October 13	1:30 p.m.	at No. 4 USC	Los Angeles Memorial Coliseum; Los Angeles, CA	L 35–46	50,975	
October 20	1:30 p.m.	No. 13 UCLA	Joe Albi Stadium; Spokane, WA	L 13–24	32,200	
October 27	1:30 p.m.	at Stanford	Stanford Stadium; Stanford, CA	L 14–45	48,000	
November 3	1:30 p.m.	Oregon^{†}	Martin Stadium; Pullman, WA	W 21–14	19,800	
November 10	1:30 p.m.	at Oregon State	Parker Stadium; Corvallis, OR	W 13–7	17,336	
November 17	1:30 p.m.	California	Martin Stadium; Pullman, WA	W 31–28	13,082	
November 24	1:30 p.m.	at Washington	Husky Stadium; Seattle, WA (Apple Cup)	W 52–26	56,500	
*Non-conference game; ^{†}Homecoming; Rankings from AP Poll released prior to the game; All times are in Pacific time

== Game summaries ==
=== At Ohio State ===
Washington State Cougars (1–2) at #1 Ohio State Buckeyes (2–0)

Quarter	1	2	3	4	Total
Washington State	0	3	0	0	3
Ohio State	0	14	13	0	27

at Ohio Stadium, Columbus, Ohio

- Date: October 6
- Game weather: Sunny, 65 °F (18 °C)
- Game attendance: 87425
- Box Score

Game information

First quarter

- No scoring

Second quarter

- OSU – Bruce Elia 17-yard run (kick failed), 7:14. Ohio State 6–0. Drive: 7 plays, 80 yards.
- OSU – Archie Griffin 6-yard pass from Cornelius Greene (pass good), 3:20. Ohio State 14–0. Drive: 9 plays, 77 yards.
- WSU – Joe Danelo 41-yard field goal, 0:22. Ohio State 14–3. Drive: 40 yards.

Third quarter

- OSU – Archie Griffin 26-yard run (kick blocked), 9:21. Ohio State 20–3. Drive: 12 plays, 84 yards.
- OSU – Bruce Elia 9-yard run (Blair Conway kick), 5:13. Ohio State 27–3. Drive: 3 plays, 33 yards.

Fourth quarter

- No scoring

Top passers

- WSU – Wally Bennett – 7/11, 50 yards, int
- OSU – Cornelius Greene – 3/6, 62 yards, TD, int

Top rushers

- WSU – Andrew Jones – 17 rushes, 64 yards
- OSU – Archie Griffin – 15 rushes, 128 yards, TD

Top receivers

- WSU – Fritz Brayton – 6 receptions, 45 yards
- OSU – Dave Hazel – 1 reception, 49 yards

=== At Washington ===
Team	1	2	3	4	Total
• Washington St	14	28	0	10	52
Washington	0	6	20	0	26

- Date:
  November 24
- Location: Husky Stadium, Seattle
- Game start:
  1:30 pm PST
- Game attendance: 56,500
- Game weather: 45 °F (7 °C)

Scoring summary
Q1		WSU	Jones 12 yard run (Danelo kick)	WSU 7–0
Q1		WSU	Jones 1 yard run (Danelo kick)	WSU 14–0
Q2		WSU	Johnson 42 yard pass from Peck (Danelo kick)	WSU 21–0
Q2		WSU	Grandberry 17 yard pass from Peck (Danelo kick)	WSU 28–0
Q2		WASH	Taggares 19 yard pass from Rowland (kick failed)	WSU 28–6
Q2		WSU	Jones 62 yard run (Danelo kick)	WSU 35–6
Q2		WSU	Grandberry 1 yard run (Danelo kick)	WSU 42–6
Q3	14:32	WASH	Conley 75 yard pass from Rowland (pass failed)	WSU 42–12
Q3		WASH	Oldes 29 yard pass from Rowland (pass failed)	WSU 42–18
Q3		WASH	Oldes 24 yard pass from Rowland (Earl pass from Rowland)	WSU 42–26
Q4		WSU	Chamberlain 2 yard run (Danelo kick)	WSU 49–26
Q4		WSU	Danelo 38 yard field goal	WSU 52–26

- Chuck Peck 9/17, 249 yds
- Andrew Jones 139 rush Yds
- Most points ever scored against Washington

== Roster ==
1973 Washington State Cougars football team roster
Players
Coaches
Offense

Pos.	#	Name	Class
G	69	Bob Aldrich	Jr
RB		Charles Anderson
QB		Wally Bennett
WR	49	Fritz Brayton	Sr
FB	30	Vern Chamberlain	So
RB		Ron Cheatham
G	61	Bob Drinkwalter	Sr
TE		Bob Engel
RB	44	Ken Grandberry	Sr
OT	51	Mike Hill	Sr
QB		John Hopkins
WR	40	Greg Johnson	Sr
FB	39	Andrew Jones	Jr
TE	86	Tim Krause	Sr
RB		Jim Lewis
OL		Wilbur McKinney
TE		Lloyd Minor
QB	10	Mike Mitchell	Jr
OL		Steve Morton
G	62	Steve Ostermann	Jr
WR		Dennis Pearson
QB	13	Chuck Peck	Jr
C	65	Geoff Reece	Jr
WR	47	Rick Riegle	Jr
OT	75	Tom Wickert	Sr
WR		Gordon Yeomans

Defense

Pos.	#	Name	Class
DL		Rod Anderson
S	36	Mike Carter	Jr
DB		Dennis Clancy
DT	71	Greg Craighead (C)	Sr
DE	79	Joe Daniels	Jr
DE	90	Mark Husfloen	So
S	37	Eric Johnson	Sr
CB	22	Basil Kimbrew	Jr
LB	66	Gary Larsen	Jr
CB	21	Morris Noble	Sr
DE	85	Don Olsen	Sr
DB		Woodrow Perkins
LB	58	Tom Poe (C)	Sr
LB		Steve Roberts
CB	24	Robin Sinclair	Sr
LB	67	Clyde Warehime	Sr
DL		Lee Weatherford
DT	77	Daryl Zanck	Sr

Special teams

Pos.	#	Name	Class
K	3	Joe Danelo	Jr
P	40	Greg Johnson	Sr

Head coach

- Jim Sweeney (6th year)

Coordinators/assistant coaches

- Ray Braun – (DC, LB)
- Joe Tiller – (OC, OL)
- Bob Simpson – (WR)
- Walt Cubley – (DE)
- Jack Elway – (QB, RB)
- Larry Donovan – (DT)
- Bill Cords – (TE, JV)
- Ron Mims – (DB)

Legend

- (C) Team captain
- (S) Suspended
- (I) Ineligible
- Injured
- Redshirt

== All-conference ==
Three Washington State players were named to the All-Pac-8 team: senior linebacker Tom Poe, junior guard Steve Ostermann, and junior center Geoff Reece. Ostermann was a repeat selection; he and Reece returned to the first team the next year.

== NFL draft ==
Three Cougars were selected in the 1974 NFL draft

Player	Position	Round	Overall	Franchise
Robin Sinclair	DB	6	152	Cincinnati Bengals
Ken Grandberry	RB	8	190	Chicago Bears
Tom Wickert	OT	9	212	Miami Dolphins
