= 1973 Washington Huskies football team =

American college football season

1973 Washington Huskies football
- Conference: Pacific-8 Conference
- Record: 2–9 (0–7 Pac-8)
- Head coach: Jim Owens (17th season)
- MVP: Dave Pear
- Captains: Jim Andrilenas; Butch Keenan; Joe Tabor; John Whitacre
- Home stadium: Husky Stadium

1973 Pacific-8 Conference football standings
	Conf.					Overall
Team	W		L		T	W		L		T
No. 8 USC $	7	–	0	–	0	9	–	2	–	1
No. 12 UCLA	6	–	1	–	0	9	–	2	–	0
Stanford	5	–	2	–	0	7	–	4	–	0
Washington State	4	–	3	–	0	5	–	6	–	0
California	2	–	5	–	0	4	–	7	–	0
Oregon	2	–	5	–	0	2	–	9	–	0
Oregon State	2	–	5	–	0	2	–	9	–	0
Washington	0	–	7	–	0	2	–	9	–	0
$ – Conference champion; Rankings from AP Poll

The 1973 Washington Huskies football team was an American football team that represented the University of Washington during the 1973 NCAA Division I football season. In its 17th season under head coach Jim Owens, the team compiled a 2–9 record, (0–7 in the Pacific-8 Conference, last), and was outscored 376 to 218.

The Huskies dropped the Apple Cup for the second straight year. The 52–26 loss at Husky Stadium was Washington's worst home loss in the series until 2021; they rebounded and won the next eight, through 1981.

Junior defensive lineman Dave Pear was selected as the team's most valuable player.

== Schedule ==
Date	Time	Opponent	Site	Result	Attendance	Source
September 15		Hawaii*	Husky Stadium; Seattle, WA	L 7–10	52,500	
September 22		at Duke*	Wallace Wade Stadium; Durham, NC	L 21–23	22,500	
September 29		Syracuse*	Husky Stadium; Seattle, WA	W 21–7	54,800	
October 6	1:35 p.m.	at California	California Memorial Stadium; Berkeley, CA	L 49–54	28,000	
October 13		Oregon State	Husky Stadium; Seattle, WA	L 7–31	55,000	
October 20	1:30 p.m.	Stanford	Husky Stadium; Seattle, WA	L 14–23	51,500	
October 27		at Oregon	Autzen Stadium; Eugene, OR (rivalry)	L 0–58	40,000	
November 3		at No. 10 UCLA	Los Angeles Memorial Coliseum; Los Angeles, CA	L 13–62	30,063	
November 10		Idaho*	Husky Stadium; Seattle, WA	W 41–14	47,000	
November 17		No. 9 USC	Husky Stadium; Seattle, WA	L 19–42	55,500	
November 24		Washington State	Husky Stadium; Seattle, WA (Apple Cup)	L 26–52	56,500	
*Non-conference game; Rankings from AP Poll released prior to the game; All times are in Pacific time

== Game summaries ==
=== Washington State ===
Team	1	2	3	4	Total
• Washington St	14	28	0	10	52
Washington	0	6	20	0	26

- Date:
  November 24
- Location: Husky Stadium, Seattle
- Game start:
  1:30 pm PST
- Game attendance: 56,500
- Game weather: 45 °F (7 °C)

Scoring summary
Q1		WSU	Jones 12 yard run (Danelo kick)	WSU 7–0
Q1		WSU	Jones 1 yard run (Danelo kick)	WSU 14–0
Q2		WSU	Johnson 42 yard pass from Peck (Danelo kick)	WSU 21–0
Q2		WSU	Grandberry 17 yard pass from Peck (Danelo kick)	WSU 28–0
Q2		WASH	Taggares 19 yard pass from Rowland (kick failed)	WSU 28–6
Q2		WSU	Jones 62 yard run (Danelo kick)	WSU 35–6
Q2		WSU	Grandberry 1 yard run (Danelo kick)	WSU 42–6
Q3	14:32	WASH	Conley 75 yard pass from Rowland (pass failed)	WSU 42–12
Q3		WASH	Oldes 29 yard pass from Rowland (pass failed)	WSU 42–18
Q3		WASH	Oldes 24 yard pass from Rowland (Earl pass from Rowland)	WSU 42–26
Q4		WSU	Chamberlain 2 yard run (Danelo kick)	WSU 49–26
Q4		WSU	Danelo 38 yard field goal	WSU 52–26

- Chris Rowland 16/36, 354 yds

== Roster ==
1973 Washington Huskies football team roster
Players
Coaches
Offense

Pos.	#	Name	Class
QB	13	Chris Rowland	So
QB	14	Dennis Fitzpatrick	Jr
QB	15	James Anderson	So
SE	20	Ken Conley	So
FB	30	Pete Taggares	Sr
FB	32	Willie Hendricks	Jr
TB	35	Donald Waters	Fr
SE	47	Walter Oldes	Sr
C	53	Jim Andrilenas (C)	Sr
C	59	Ray Pinney	So
G	66	Charles Jackson	Fr
G	67	Lou Quinn	So
OT	68	Rick Hayes	Sr
OT	70	Carl Rose	Sr
OT	74	John Whitacre (C)	Jr
SE	91	Scott Phillips	Fr
TE	97	Nelse Petermann	So
TE	99	Robin Earl	Fr

Defense

Pos.	#	Name	Class
CB	4	Pedro Hawkins	So
DB	11	Hans Woldseth	Sr
WS	18	Al Burleson	So
SS	22	Steve Lipe	So
CB	23	Bob Boustead	Jr
CB	28	Frank Reed	So
LB	36	Dean Schlamp	So
CB	42	Roberto Jourdan	So
LB	48	Jim Kristof	Jr
LB	50	Dan Lloyd	So
DE	71	Murphy McFarland	Sr
DT	73	Mike Green	So
DT	80	Dave Pear	Jr
DE	92	Paul Strohmeier	So
LB	94	Joe Tabor (C)	Sr
DE	95	Bob Martin	Jr

Special teams

Pos.	#	Name	Class
P	3	Skip Boyd	Jr
K		Gustavo Clark

Head coach

- Jim Owens (17th year)

Coordinators/assistant coaches

Legend

- (C) Team captain
- (S) Suspended
- (I) Ineligible
- Injured
- Redshirt

== NFL draft selections ==
One University of Washington Husky was selected in the 1974 NFL draft, which lasted 17 rounds with 442 selections.

= Husky Hall of Fame

Player	Position	Round	Pick	Franchise
Rick Hayes	Tackle	11th	284	Los Angeles Rams
