= 1973 California Golden Bears football team =

American college football season

1973 California Golden Bears football
- Conference: Pacific-8 Conference
- Record: 4–7 (2–5 Pac-8)
- Head coach: Mike White (2nd season)
- Offensive coordinator: Roger Theder
- Captains: Kevin O'Dorisio; Fred Weber
- Home stadium: California Memorial Stadium

1973 Pacific-8 Conference football standings
	Conf.					Overall
Team	W		L		T	W		L		T
No. 8 USC $	7	–	0	–	0	9	–	2	–	1
No. 12 UCLA	6	–	1	–	0	9	–	2	–	0
Stanford	5	–	2	–	0	7	–	4	–	0
Washington State	4	–	3	–	0	5	–	6	–	0
California	2	–	5	–	0	4	–	7	–	0
Oregon	2	–	5	–	0	2	–	9	–	0
Oregon State	2	–	5	–	0	2	–	9	–	0
Washington	0	–	7	–	0	2	–	9	–	0
$ – Conference champion; Rankings from AP Poll

The 1973 California Golden Bears football team was an American football team that represented the University of California, Berkeley in the Pacific-8 Conference (Pac-8) during the 1973 NCAA Division I football season. In their second year under head coach Mike White, the Golden Bears compiled a 4–7 record (2–5 against Pac-8 opponents), finished in a tie for fifth place in the Pac-8, and were outscored by their opponents by a combined total of 380 to 245.

The team's statistical leaders included Vince Ferragamo with 1,014 passing yards (Steve Bartkowski added 910 passing yards), Chuck Muncie with 801 rushing yards, and Wesley Walker with 361 receiving yards.

== Schedule ==
Date	Time	Opponent	Site	Result	Attendance	Source
September 15		at No. 6 Alabama*	Legion Field; Birmingham, AL	L 0–66	71,119	
September 22	1:30 p.m.	Illinois*	California Memorial Stadium; Berkeley, CA	L 7–27	22,000	
September 29	11:00 a.m.	at Army*	Michie Stadium; West Point, NY	W 51–6	40,982	
October 6	1:35 p.m.	Washington	California Memorial Stadium; Berkeley, CA	W 54–49	28,000	
October 13	1:30 p.m.	at Oregon	Autzen Stadium; Eugene, OR	L 10–41	28,700	
October 20	1:30 p.m.	Oregon State	California Memorial Stadium; Berkeley, CA	W 24–14	24,123	
October 27	3:00 p.m.	at No. 13 UCLA	Los Angeles Memorial Coliseum; Los Angeles, CA (rivalry)	L 21–61	35,492	
November 3	1:30 p.m.	No. 9 USC	California Memorial Stadium; Berkeley, CA	L 14–50	48,000	
November 10	1:33 p.m.	San Jose State*	California Memorial Stadium; Berkeley, CA	W 19–9	12,000	
November 17	1:31 p.m.	at Washington State	Martin Stadium; Pullman, WA	L 28–31	13,082	
November 24	1:35 p.m.	at Stanford	Stanford Stadium; Stanford, CA (Big Game)	L 17–26	67,000	
*Non-conference game; Rankings from AP Poll released prior to the game; All times are in Pacific time

== Game summaries ==
=== Washington ===
Team	1	2	3	4	Total
Washington	7	7	7	28	49
• California	14	23	7	10	54

- Date: October 6
- Location: California Memorial Stadium, Berkeley, CA

Scoring summary
1	CAL	Muncie 7-yard run (VanderMeer kick)	CAL 7-0
1	WASH	Waters 9-yard run (King kick)	Tied 7-7
1	CAL	Muncie 1-yard run (VanderMeer kick)	CAL 14-7
2	CAL	Strickland 1-yard run (VanderMeer kick)	CAL 21-7
2	CAL	Shaughnessy 75-yard pass from Bartkowski (VanderMeer kick)	CAL 28-7
2	CAL	Safety	CAL 30-7
2	CAL	Strickland 52-yard pass from Bartkowski (VanderMeer kick)	CAL 37-7
2	WASH	Brown 5-yard pass from Rowland (King kick)	CAL 37-14
3	CAL	Muncie 5-yard run (VanderMeer kick)	CAL 44-14
3	WASH	Fitzpatrick 1-yard run (King kick)	CAL 44-21
4	WASH	Brown 3-yard pass from Rowland (King kick)	CAL 44-28
4	WASH	Conley 17-yard pass from Rowland (King kick)	CAL 44-35
4	CAL	Bailey 48-yard run (VanderMeer kick)	CAL 51-35
4	CAL	VanderMeer 27-yard field goal	CAL 54-35
4	WASH	Waters 28-yard pass from Rowland (King kick)	CAL 54-42
4	WASH	McDonald 9-yard pass from Rowland (King kick)	CAL 54-49

Cal gained 625 yards of total offense, the second best in school history. Steve Bartkowski came off the bench when Vince Ferragamo was shaken up with the Golden Bears ahead 21–7.

=== Oregon State ===
Team	1	2	3	4	Total
Oregon St	0	7	7	0	14
• California	9	7	0	8	24

- Date: October 20
- Location: Memorial Stadium, Berkeley, California
- Game attendance: 24,000

Scoring summary
1	4:36	CAL	Muncie 1-yard run (kick failed)	California 6–0
1	1:14	CAL	VanderMeer 27-yard field goal	California 9–0
2	5:33	ORST	Maurer 1-yard run (Kuloos kick)	California 9–7
2	1:44	CAL	Leathers 27-yard pass from Bartkowski (VanderMeer kick)	California 16–7
3	8:38	ORST	Maurer 2-yard run (Kuloos kick)	California 16–14
4	13:21	CAL	Strickland 1-yard run (two-point conversion good)	California 24–14

== Roster ==
1973 California Golden Bears football team roster
Players
Coaches
Offense

Pos.	#	Name	Class
OT		Ted Albrecht	Fr
QB	10	Steve Bartkowski	Jr
QB	15	Vince Ferragamo	So
RB		Chuck Muncie	So
WR		Steve Rivera	So
RB		Howard Strickland
WR		Wesley Walker	Fr

Defense

Pos.	#	Name	Class
DB		Herman Edwards	So
DE	95	Jeff Sevy	Jr
DE	86	Dave Frey	Sr
DT	90	Bob Swenson	Jr

Special teams

Pos.	#	Name	Class
PK		Ron VanderMeer

Head coach

- Mike White

Coordinators/assistant coaches

Legend

- (C) Team captain
- (S) Suspended
- (I) Ineligible
- Injured
- Redshirt
