= 1973 USC Trojans football team =

American college football season

1973 USC Trojans football

Pac-8 champion

Rose Bowl, L 21–42 vs. Ohio State
- Conference: Pacific-8 Conference

Ranking
- Coaches: No. 7
- AP: No. 8
- Record: 9–2–1 (7–0 Pac-8)
- Head coach: John McKay (14th season)
- Offensive coordinator: John Robinson (2nd season)
- Captains: Lynn Swann; Artimus Parker
- Home stadium: Los Angeles Memorial Coliseum

1973 Pacific-8 Conference football standings
	Conf.					Overall
Team	W		L		T	W		L		T
No. 8 USC $	7	–	0	–	0	9	–	2	–	1
No. 12 UCLA	6	–	1	–	0	9	–	2	–	0
Stanford	5	–	2	–	0	7	–	4	–	0
Washington State	4	–	3	–	0	5	–	6	–	0
California	2	–	5	–	0	4	–	7	–	0
Oregon	2	–	5	–	0	2	–	9	–	0
Oregon State	2	–	5	–	0	2	–	9	–	0
Washington	0	–	7	–	0	2	–	9	–	0
$ – Conference champion; Rankings from AP Poll

The 1973 USC Trojans football team represented the University of Southern California (USC) as a member of the Pacific-8 Conference (Pac-8) during the 1973 NCAA Division I football season. Led by 14th-year head coach John McKay, the Trojans compiled an overall record of 9–2–1 with a mark of 7–0 in conference play, winning the Pac-8 title for the second consecutive season. USC earned a berth in the Rose Bowl, where the Trojans lost to Ohio State. The team played home games at Los Angeles Memorial Coliseum in Los Angeles.

== Schedule ==
Date	Time	Opponent	Rank	Site	TV	Result	Attendance	Source
September 15		Arkansas*	No. 1	Los Angeles Memorial Coliseum; Los Angeles, CA		W 17–0	73,231	
September 22		at Georgia Tech*	No. 1	Grant Field; Atlanta, GA		W 23–6	58,228	
September 29		No. 8 Oklahoma*	No. 1	Los Angeles Memorial Coliseum; Los Angeles, CA	ABC	T 7–7	84,016	
October 6		at Oregon State	No. 4	Parker Stadium; Corvallis, OR		W 21–7	21,732	
October 13		Washington State	No. 4	Los Angeles Memorial Coliseum; Los Angeles, CA		W 46–35	50,975	
October 20		Oregon^{†}	No. 6	Los Angeles Memorial Coliseum; Los Angeles, CA		W 31–10	53,155	
October 27		at No. 8 Notre Dame*	No. 6	Notre Dame Stadium; Notre Dame, IN (rivalry)	ABC	L 14–23	59,075	
November 3	1:30 p.m.	at California	No. 9	California Memorial Stadium; Berkeley, CA		W 50–14	48,000	
November 10	1:30 p.m.	Stanford	No. 8	Los Angeles Memorial Coliseum; Los Angeles, CA (rivalry)		W 27–26	63,806	
November 17		at Washington	No. 9	Husky Stadium; Seattle, WA		W 42–19	55,500	
November 24		vs. No. 8 UCLA	No. 9	Los Angeles Memorial Coliseum; Los Angeles, CA (Victory Bell)	ABC	W 23–13	88,037	
January 1, 1974		vs. No. 2 Ohio State*	No. 7	Rose Bowl; Pasadena, CA (Rose Bowl)	NBC	L 21–42	105,267	
*Non-conference game; ^{†}Homecoming; Rankings from AP Poll released prior to the game; All times are in Pacific time

== Game summaries ==
=== Oregon ===
Team	1	2	3	4	Total
Oregon	0	7	0	3	10
• USC	14	3	7	7	31

- Date: October 20
- Location: Los Angeles Memorial Coliseum • Los Angeles
- Game attendance: 53,155

Scoring summary
1	3:25	USC	McKay 35 yard pass from Haden (Limahelu kick)	USC 7-0
1	3:07	USC	D. Reece 30 yard interception return (Limahelu kick)	USC 14-0
2	:39	USC	Limahelu 39 yard field goal	USC 17-0
2	:02	ORE	Singleton 3 yard run (Palm kick)	USC 17-7
3	9:58	USC	Haden 1 yard run (Limahelu kick)	USC 24-7
4	14:03	ORE	Palm 21 yard field goal	USC 24-10
4	7:04	USC	Swann 55 yard pass from Haden (Limahelu kick)	USC 31-10

=== vs. No. 8 UCLA ===
No. 8 UCLA vs. No. 9 USC

Team	1	2	3	4	Total
No. 8 Bruins	3	7	0	3	13
• No. 9 Trojans	7	10	3	3	23

- Date: November 24
- Location: Los Angeles Memorial Coliseum
- Game attendance: 88,037
- TV announcers (ABC): Keith Jackson and Lee Grosscup

Scoring summary
Q1		USC	Davis 4 yard run (Limahelu kick)	USC 7–0
Q1		UCLA	Herrera 42 yard field goal	USC 7–3
Q2		USC	McKay 16 yard pass from Haden (Limahelu kick)	USC 14–3
Q2		UCLA	Johnson 3 yard run (Herrera kick)	USC 14–10
Q2		USC	Limahelu 35 yard field goal	USC 17–10
Q3		USC	Limahelu 32 yard field goal	USC 20–10
Q4	4:30	UCLA	Herrera 27 yard field goal	USC 20–13
Q4	1:07	USC	Limahelu 28 yard field goal	USC 23–13

- USC wins conference title and Rose Bowl berth
- Anthony Davis 27 Rush, 145 Yds

== Personnel ==
1973 USC Trojans football team roster
Players
Coaches
Offense

Pos.	#	Name	Class
QB	9	Rob Adolph
OL	66	Bill Bain
WR, P	7	Dave Boulware
OL	63	Booker Brown	Sr
RB	21	Allen Carter
OL	71	Mike Cordell
RB	28	Anthony Davis	Jr
WR	26	Shelton Diggs	Fr
RB	37	Ken Gray
QB	10	Pat Haden	Jr
TE	86	Dean Lingenfelter
OL	58	Bob McCaffrey
WR	25	J.K. McKay	Jr
RB	27	Rod McNeill	Sr
RB	44	Manfred Moore	Sr
TE	89	Jim Obradovich
OL	70	Steve Riley
WR	22	Lynn Swann (C)	Sr
RB	34	Ray Washmera

Defense

Pos.	#	Name	Class
LB	55	Charles Anthony
LB	50	Kevin Bruce
DB	24	Marvin Cobb	Jr
DL	72	Monte Doris
DL	79	Gary Jeter	Fr
DT		Greg Marderian
LB		Dale Mitchell
DB	14	Artimus Parker (C)	Sr
DB	49	Charles Phillips
DL	87	Ed Powell
DB	46	Danny Reece
DL	70	Art Riley
DB	47	Ted Roberson
DL	41	James Sims
LB	83	Richard Wood	Jr

Special teams

Pos.	#	Name	Class
K	11	Chris Limahelu

Head coach

- John McKay

Coordinators/assistant coaches

- Willie Brown
- Craig Fertig
- Wayne Fontes
- Ray George
- Marv Goux
- Skip Husbands
- Dave Levy
- John Robinson

Legend

- (C) Team captain
- (S) Suspended
- (I) Ineligible
- Injured
- Redshirt

Roster
Last update: 2020-Dec-30

== Statistics ==
=== Passing ===
Player	Comp	Att	Yards	TD	INT
Pat Haden	137	247	1,832	13	11

=== Rushing ===
Player	Att	Yards	TD
Anthony Davis	276	1,112	

=== Receiving ===
Player	Rec	Yards	TD
Lynn Swann	42	714	6
