= 1973 Stanford Cardinals football team =

American college football season

1973 Stanford Cardinals football
- Conference: Pacific-8 Conference
- Record: 7–4 (5–2 Pac-8)
- Head coach: Jack Christiansen (2nd season)
- Offensive coordinator: Robert A. Jones (2nd season)
- Defensive coordinator: Norb Hecker (2nd season)
- Captains: Mike Boryla; Randy Poltl
- Home stadium: Stanford Stadium

1973 Pacific-8 Conference football standings
| | Conf. | | | | | Overall |
| Team | W | | L | | T | W | | L | | T |
|---|---|---|---|---|---|---|---|---|---|---|
| No. 8 USC $ | 7 | – | 0 | – | 0 | 9 | – | 2 | – | 1 |
| No. 12 UCLA | 6 | – | 1 | – | 0 | 9 | – | 2 | – | 0 |
| Stanford | 5 | – | 2 | – | 0 | 7 | – | 4 | – | 0 |
| Washington State | 4 | – | 3 | – | 0 | 5 | – | 6 | – | 0 |
| California | 2 | – | 5 | – | 0 | 4 | – | 7 | – | 0 |
| Oregon | 2 | – | 5 | – | 0 | 2 | – | 9 | – | 0 |
| Oregon State | 2 | – | 5 | – | 0 | 2 | – | 9 | – | 0 |
| Washington | 0 | – | 7 | – | 0 | 2 | – | 9 | – | 0 |
$ – Conference champion; Rankings from AP Poll

The 1973 Stanford Cardinals football team represented Stanford University in the Pacific-8 Conference during the 1973 NCAA Division I football season. Led by second-year head coach Jack Christiansen, the Cardinals were 7–4 overall (5–2 in Pac-8, third) and played home games on campus at Stanford Stadium in Stanford, California. The Pac-8 did not allow a second bowl team until the 1975 season.

== Schedule ==
| Date | Time | Opponent | Site | TV | Result | Attendance | Source |
|---|---|---|---|---|---|---|---|
| September 15 | 12:50 p.m. | No. 7 Penn State* | Stanford Stadium; Stanford, CA | ABC | L 6–20 | 57,000 | |
| September 22 | 10:30 a.m. | at No. 5 Michigan* | Michigan Stadium; Ann Arbor, MI | | L 10–47 | 80,177 | |
| September 29 | 1:30 p.m. | San Jose State* | Stanford Stadium; Stanford, CA (rivalry) | | W 23–12 | 47,500 | |
| October 6 | 12:57 p.m. | at Illinois* | Memorial Stadium; Champaign, IL | | W 24–0 | 45,383 | |
| October 13 | 1:35 p.m. | No. 15 UCLA | Stanford Stadium; Stanford, CA | | L 13–59 | 55,000 | |
| October 20 | 1:30 p.m. | at Washington | Husky Stadium; Seattle, WA | | W 23–14 | 51,500 | |
| October 27 | 1:35 p.m. | Washington State | Stanford Stadium; Stanford, CA | | W 45–14 | 48,000 | |
| November 3 | 1:30 p.m. | at Oregon State | Parker Stadium; Corvallis, OR | | W 24–23 | 17,025 | |
| November 10 | 1:30 p.m. | at No. 8 USC | Los Angeles Memorial Coliseum; Los Angeles, CA (rivalry) | | L 26–27 | 63,806 | |
| November 17 | 1:30 p.m. | Oregon | Stanford Stadium; Stanford, CA | | W 24–7 | 21,000 | |
| November 24 | 1:35 p.m. | California | Stanford Stadium; Stanford, CA (Big Game) | | W 26–17 | 67,000 | |
*Non-conference game; Rankings from AP Poll released prior to the game; All times are in Pacific time

== Game summaries ==
=== Penn State ===
| Quarter | 1 | 2 | 3 | 4 | Total |
|---|---|---|---|---|---|
| #7 Penn State | 0 | 10 | 7 | 3 | 20 |
| Stanford | 0 | 0 | 0 | 6 | 6 |

at Stanford Stadium • Stanford, CA

- Date: Saturday, September 15
- Game attendance: 57,000

Game information
PS — Safety blocked kick went out of the end zone.

PS — Hayman 14-yard pass from Shuman (Natale pass from Shuman).

PS — Cappelletti 2-yard run (Bahr kick).

PS — Field goal, Bahr 24 yards.

Stan — Stone 8-yard pass from Boryla (pass failed).

Penn State’s defense dominated Stanford, consistently applying pressure and forcing the opposing offense into hurried plays. The Nittany Lions’ blitzing strategy disrupted Stanford’s rhythm, resulting in sacks, turnovers, and limited offensive production, but Penn State was mostly unable to convert that pressure into points. The scoring started in the second quarter when Lion defensemen Greg Murphy and Doug Allen broke through the punt defense, with Allen belting the ball through the end zone for a safety. Late in the half, Jimmy Bradley recovered a fumble at the Stanford 10 yard line to set up another score two plays later when quarterback Tom Shuman found Gary Hayman from 14 yards out. In the second half, Cappelletti and Bahr rounded out the scoring for Penn State and Stanford scored against the Penn State reserves with three minutes left in the game.

=== Washington ===
| Team | 1 | 2 | 3 | 4 | Total |
|---|---|---|---|---|---|
| • Stanford | 6 | 7 | 3 | 7 | 23 |
| Washington | 0 | 0 | 0 | 14 | 14 |

- Date: October 20
- Location: Husky Stadium, Seattle, Washington
- Game attendance: 51,500

Scoring summary
| 1 | STAN | Garcia 37-yard field goal | Stanford 3–0 |
| 1 | STAN | Garcia 38-yard field goal | Stanford 6–0 |
| 2 | STAN | Test 10-yard pass from Boryla (Garcia kick) | Stanford 13–0 |
| 3 | STAN | Garcia 47-yard field goal | Stanford 16–0 |
| 4 | WASH | Phillips 46-yard pass from Rowland (Boyd kick) | Stanford 16–7 |
| 4 | WASH | Rowland 1-yard run (Boyd kick) | Stanford 16–14 |
| 4 | STAN | Laidlaw 8-yard run (Garcia kick) | Stanford 23–14 |

=== California ===
| Team | 1 | 2 | 3 | 4 | Total |
|---|---|---|---|---|---|
| California | 3 | 0 | 7 | 7 | 17 |
| • Stanford | 0 | 3 | 10 | 13 | 26 |

- Date: November 24
- Location: Stanford Stadium, Stanford, California
- Game attendance: 67,000

Scoring summary
| 1 | CAL | VanderMeer 41-yard field goal | CAL 3-0 |
| 2 | STAN | Garcia 36-yard field goal | Tied 3-3 |
| 3 | CAL | Muncie 15-yard run (VanderMeer kick) | CAL 10-3 |
| 3 | STAN | Jena 8-yard run (Garcia kick) | Tied 10-10 |
| 3 | STAN | Garcia 37-yard field goal | STAN 13-10 |
| 4 | CAL | Ferragamo 1-yard run (VanderMeer kick) | CAL 17-13 |
| 4 | STAN | Inge 3-yard run (kick failed) | STAN 19-17 |
| 4 | STAN | Laidlaw 10-yard run (Garcia kick) | STAN 26-17 |

Junior running back Scott Laidlaw gained 132 yards on 23 carries while Rod Garcia finished his career with 42 field goals, and NCAA record, and 18 for the season, which tied the NCAA record. Stanford played most of the second half without starting quarterback Mike Boryla, who left the game with a bruised throwing arm.

== Roster ==
1973 Stanford Cardinal football team roster
Players
Coaches
Offense

| Pos. | # | Name | Class |
|---|---|---|---|
| QB | 12 | Mike Boryla (C) | Sr |
| WR | 47 | Tony Hill | Fr |
| RB | 33 | Scott Laidlaw | Jr |
| QB | 19 | Dave Ottmar | Sr |
| WR | 21 | Bill Singler | Jr |

Defense

| Pos. | # | Name | Class |
|---|---|---|---|
| DE | 83 | Pat Donovan | Jr |
| SS | 36 | Randy Poltl (C) | Sr |
| DT | 91 | Roger Stillwell | Sr |

Special teams

| Pos. | # | Name | Class |
|---|---|---|---|
| K | 14 | Rod Garcia | Sr |
| P | 19 | Dave Ottmar | Sr |

Head coach

- Jack Christiansen (2nd year)

Coordinators/assistant coaches

- David Currey – Offensive back
- Pete Kettela – Receivers
- Hudson Houck – Offensive line
- Norb Hecker – Defensive Coordinator & defensive line
- Ray Handley – Linebacker
- George Seifert – Defensive back
- Bill Moultrie – Special Teams Coordinator
- Gunther Cunningham – Assistant

Legend

- (C) Team captain
- (S) Suspended
- (I) Ineligible
- Injured
- Redshirt

== All-conference ==
Five Stanford players were named to the All-Pac-8 team: quarterback Mike Boryla, wide receiver Bill Singler, defensive tackle Roger Stillwell, safety Randy Poltl, and kicker Rod Garcia; Singler and Stillwell were juniors.

== NFL draft ==
Six Stanford seniors were selected in the 1974 NFL draft.
