= 1973 Oregon State Beavers football team =

American college football season

1973 Oregon State Beavers football
- Conference: Pacific-8 Conference
- Record: 2–9 (2–5 Pac-8)
- Head coach: Dee Andros (9th season)
- Defensive coordinator: Rich Brooks (1st season)
- Home stadium: Parker Stadium; Civic Stadium

1973 Pacific-8 Conference football standings
| | Conf. | | | | | Overall |
| Team | W | | L | | T | W | | L | | T |
|---|---|---|---|---|---|---|---|---|---|---|
| No. 8 USC $ | 7 | – | 0 | – | 0 | 9 | – | 2 | – | 1 |
| No. 12 UCLA | 6 | – | 1 | – | 0 | 9 | – | 2 | – | 0 |
| Stanford | 5 | – | 2 | – | 0 | 7 | – | 4 | – | 0 |
| Washington State | 4 | – | 3 | – | 0 | 5 | – | 6 | – | 0 |
| California | 2 | – | 5 | – | 0 | 4 | – | 7 | – | 0 |
| Oregon | 2 | – | 5 | – | 0 | 2 | – | 9 | – | 0 |
| Oregon State | 2 | – | 5 | – | 0 | 2 | – | 9 | – | 0 |
| Washington | 0 | – | 7 | – | 0 | 2 | – | 9 | – | 0 |
$ – Conference champion; Rankings from AP Poll

The 1973 Oregon State Beavers football team represented Oregon State University as a member of the Pacific-8 Conference (Pac-8) during the 1973 NCAA Division I football season. In their ninth season under head coach Dee Andros, the Beavers compiled an overall record of 2–9 with a mark of 2–5 in conference play, placing in a three-way tie for fifth in the Pac-8, and were outscored 293 to 166. The team played four home games on campus at Parker Stadium in Corvallis, with one at Civic Stadium in Portland.

With their three-point road win over rival Oregon in the season finale, Andros' record improved to 8–1 against the Ducks in the Civil War game.

== Schedule ==
| Date | Time | Opponent | Site | Result | Attendance | Source |
|---|---|---|---|---|---|---|
| September 15 | | at No. 12 Auburn* | Legion Field; Birmingham, AL | L 9–18 | 45,000 | |
| September 22 | | SMU* | Parker Stadium; Corvallis, OR | L 16–35 | 26,189 | |
| September 29 | | at BYU* | Cougar Stadium; Provo, UT | L 14–37 | 27,434 | |
| October 6 | | No. 4 USC | Parker Stadium; Corvallis, OR | L 7–21 | 21,732 | |
| October 13 | | at Washington | Husky Stadium; Seattle, WA | W 31–7 | 55,000 | |
| October 20 | 1:30 p.m. | at California | California Memorial Stadium; Berkeley, CA | L 14–24 | 24,123 | |
| October 27 | | No. 11 Arizona State* | Civic Stadium; Portland, OR | L 14–44 | 20,188 | |
| November 3 | 1:30 p.m. | Stanford | Parker Stadium; Corvallis, OR | L 23–24 | 17,025 | |
| November 10 | | Washington State | Parker Stadium; Corvallis, OR | L 7–13 | 17,336 | |
| November 17 | | at No. 8 UCLA | Los Angeles Memorial Coliseum; Los Angeles, CA | L 14–56 | 18,540 | |
| November 24 | | at Oregon | Autzen Stadium; Eugene, OR (Civil War) | W 17–14 | 39,700 | |
*Non-conference game; Rankings from AP Poll released prior to the game; All times are in Pacific time

== Roster ==
- QB Alvin White
