= 1973 Oregon Ducks football team =

American college football season

1973 Oregon Ducks football
- Conference: Pacific-8 Conference
- Record: 2–9 (2–5 Pac-8)
- Head coach: Dick Enright (2nd season)
- Offensive coordinator: Jesse Branch (1st season)
- Defensive coordinator: Sam Robertson (1st season)
- Captain: Mike Jodoin
- Home stadium: Autzen Stadium

1973 Pacific-8 Conference football standings
	Conf.					Overall
Team	W		L		T	W		L		T
No. 8 USC $	7	–	0	–	0	9	–	2	–	1
No. 12 UCLA	6	–	1	–	0	9	–	2	–	0
Stanford	5	–	2	–	0	7	–	4	–	0
Washington State	4	–	3	–	0	5	–	6	–	0
California	2	–	5	–	0	4	–	7	–	0
Oregon	2	–	5	–	0	2	–	9	–	0
Oregon State	2	–	5	–	0	2	–	9	–	0
Washington	0	–	7	–	0	2	–	9	–	0
$ – Conference champion; Rankings from AP Poll

The 1973 Oregon Ducks football team represented the University of Oregon during the 1973 NCAA Division I football season. In his second and final year as head coach, Dick Enright led the Ducks to a 2–9 record (2–5 in Pac-8, tied for fifth)

Six weeks after the season ended, Enright was fired by athletic director Norv Ritchey in early January, with the university buying out the remainder of his four-year contract. He was immediately succeeded by assistant coach Don Read, who handled quarterbacks and receivers for the past two seasons.

== Schedule ==
Date	Time	Opponent	Site	Result	Attendance	Source
September 15	7:30 pm	No. 13 Arizona State*	Autzen Stadium; Eugene, OR	L 20–26	40,100	
September 22	1:57 pm	at Air Force*	Falcon Stadium; Colorado Springs, CO	L 17–24	34,541	
September 29	7:30 pm	Utah*	Autzen Stadium; Eugene, OR	L 17–35	31,500	
October 6	10:15 am	at No. 5 Michigan*	Michigan Stadium; Ann Arbor, MI	L 0–24	81,113	
October 13	1:30 pm	California	Autzen Stadium; Eugene, OR	W 41–10	28,700	
October 20	1:30 pm	at No. 6 USC	Los Angeles Coliseum; Los Angeles, CA	L 10–31	53,155	
October 27	1:30 pm	Washington	Autzen Stadium; Eugene, OR (rivalry)	W 58–0	40,000	
November 3	1:30 pm	at Washington State	Martin Stadium; Pullman, WA	L 14–21	19,800	
November 10	1:50 pm	No. 9 UCLA	Autzen Stadium; Eugene, OR	L 7–27	21,200	
November 17	1:30 pm	at Stanford	Stanford Stadium; Stanford, CA	L 7–24	21,000	
November 24	1:30 pm	Oregon State	Autzen Stadium; Eugene, OR (Civil War)	L 14–17	39,700	
*Non-conference game; Rankings from AP Poll released prior to the game; All times are in Pacific time

== Roster ==
1973 Oregon Ducks football team roster
Players
Coaches
Offense

Pos.	#	Name	Class
WR	26	Maurice Anderson	Sr
OL	66	LeFrancis Arnold	Sr
G	76	Mike Bollinger	Sr
RB	39	Eugene Brown	So
TE	81	Russ Francis	Jr
OL	72	Tim Guy	Sr
RB	44	Greg Herd	Sr
OL	71	Ron Hunt	So
RB	33	Rick Kane
WR	19	Johnny Kerr	Sr
WR	89	Greg Lindsey	Sr
RB	30	Henderson Martin
WR	85	Pat McNally	Jr
QB	10	John Nehl
WR	45	Bob Palm	Jr
OL	56	Mike Popovich	Jr
RB	22	Don Reynolds	Jr
QB	15	Herb Singleton	Jr
QB	17	Norv Turner	Jr

Defense

Pos.	#	Name	Class
DB	29	Mario Clark	So
DB	23	Jack Conners	Sr
DE	96	Keith Davis	Sr
DB	38	Steve Donnelly	Jr
LB	43	Bobby Green	So
LB	55	Mike Jodoin	Sr
DE	88	Don Johnson	So
DL	51	Reggie Lewis	So
DL	99	George Martin	Jr
LB	54	Bill Meyer	Sr
DL	94	Dave Morgan	So
DB	18	Tim Slapnicka	Jr
DL	97	Art Webb	Sr
S	12	Chuck Wills	So

Special teams

Pos.	#	Name	Class
K, P	45	Bob Palm	Jr
K	9	Keith Lively
K	24	Hugh Woodward

Head coach

- Dick Enright (2nd year)

Coordinators/assistant coaches

- Jesse Branch (OC)
- Sam Robertson (DC)

Legend

- (C) Team captain
- (S) Suspended
- (I) Ineligible
- Injured
- Redshirt

== All-conference ==
Three Oregon underclassmen were named to the All-Pac-8 team: tight end Russ Francis, defensive back Steve Donnelly, and defensive tackle Reggie Lewis. Francis and Donnelly were juniors and Lewis was a sophomore.

== NFL draft ==
Two Oregon seniors were selected in the 1974 NFL draft: tackle Tim Guy (122nd) and defensive back Jack Conners (400th).
