= Jim Bright (psychologist) =

Australian psychologist

Jim Bright is an Australian organisational psychologist and was Professor of Career Education and Development at Australian Catholic University (ACU) between 2006 and 2023. He authored the Chaos Theory of Careers with Robert Pryor. He has served as the Director of Research and Impact for the Ed Tech startup Become Education.

== Background ==
His earlier published work focussed on occupational stress, in particular Karasek's Demands-Support model, and Fletcher's Catastrophe model. He also published research on the effectiveness of different resume layouts in the International Journal of Selection and Assessment.

Most recently he has developed the Chaos Theory of Careers that characterizes career behaviour as the fractal patterns that emerge from individuals characterised as complex dynamical systems. Careers and career paths are deemed to be non-linear, subject to continual and unpredictable change and phase shift and limited by the operation of an attractor: Point (Goal); Pendulum (Role); Torus (Routine) and Strange (Complex) Attractors. The model challenges traditional notions of "fit" between people and careers; and emphasises the unpredictable nature of careers.

== Works ==
He has published a range of books relating to Career Development and Organisational Psychology including Stress: myth theory and research, Resumes that get shortlisted, Brilliant CV, Should I stay or should I go, Amazing Resumes, Getting a Brilliant Job: the student's guide, and The Chaos Theory of Careers: a new perspective on working in the twenty-first century.
