= Randy Poltl =

American football player (born 1952)

No. 29, 21
- Position: Defensive back

Personal information
- Born: March 26, 1952 (age 74); Long Beach, California, U.S.
- Listed height: 6 ft 3 in (1.91 m)
- Listed weight: 190 lb (86 kg)

Career information
- High school: Bishop Alemany (Los Angeles, California)
- College: Stanford
- NFL draft: 1974: 12th round, 311th overall pick

Career history
- Minnesota Vikings (1974); Denver Broncos (1975–1977)

Awards and highlights
- 2× First-team All-Pac-8 (1972, 1973)

Career NFL statistics
- Interceptions: 1
- Fumble recoveries: 1
- Defensive touchdowns: 1
- Stats at Pro Football Reference

Randy Poltl (born March 26, 1952) is an American former professional football player who played defensive back for three seasons for the Minnesota Vikings and Denver Broncos.
