= Andrew Jones (American football) =

American football player (born 1952)

No. 36
- Position: Running back

Personal information
- Born: October 23, 1952 (age 74); Jackson, Mississippi, U.S.
- Listed height: 6 ft 2 in (1.88 m)
- Listed weight: 216 lb (98 kg)

Career information
- High school: East Technical (Cleveland, Ohio)
- College: Washington State
- NFL draft: 1975: 3rd round, 60th overall pick

Career history
- New Orleans Saints (1975–1976)
- Stats at Pro Football Reference

Andrew Lee "Beebop" Jones (born October 23, 1952) is an American former professional football running back who played for the New Orleans Saints of the National Football League (NFL). He played college football for the Washington State Cougars and was selected by the Saints in the third round of the 1975 NFL draft.

== Early life ==
Andrew Lee Jones was born on October 23, 1952, in Jackson, Mississippi. He attended East Technical High School in Cleveland, Ohio.

== College career ==
Jones enrolled at Washington State University to play college football for the Cougars. He was on the freshman team in 1971 and was a three-year varsity letterman from 1972 to 1974. He missed most of his senior year due to a knee injury. Jones finished his varsity career with 333 carries for 1,563 yards and 11 touchdowns and seven receptions for 49 yards and one touchdown.

== Professional career ==
Jones was selected by the Saints in the third round, with the 60th overall pick, of the 1975 NFL draft. He rushed for over 100 yards during the preseason. He played in 13 regular season games, starting one, for the Saints as a rookie in 1975, rushing 42 times for 108 yards and one touchdown while also catching ten passes for 52 yards. Jones appeared in two games, starting one, during the 1976 season and recorded one carry for two yards before being placed on injured reserve in late September.
