= Kermit Johnson =

American football player (born 1952)

No. 47
- Position: Running back

Personal information
- Born: February 22, 1952 (age 74); Los Angeles, California, U.S.
- Listed height: 6 ft 1 in (1.85 m)
- Listed weight: 201 lb (91 kg)

Career information
- High school: Blair (Pasadena, California)
- College: UCLA
- NFL draft: 1974: 7th round, 166th overall pick

Career history
- Southern California Sun (1974); San Francisco 49ers (1975–1976)

Awards and highlights
- Consensus All-American (1973); 2× First-team All-Pac-8 (1972, 1973)

Career NFL statistics
- Rushing attempts: 36
- Rushing yards: 124
- Rushing TDs: 1
- Stats at Pro Football Reference

Kermit DeKoven Johnson (born February 22, 1952) is an American former professional football player who was a running back for the San Francisco 49ers of the National Football League (NFL). He played college football for the UCLA Bruins and was a consensus All-American in 1973. He also played for the Southern California Sun of the World Football League (WFL).

== Early life ==
Kermit DeKoven Johnson was born on February 22, 1952, in Los Angeles, California. He attended Blair High School in his hometown of Pasadena, California. His Pasadena Sports Hall of Fame profile states that "In 1969, Kermit Johnson was a member and leader of arguably the best high school football team ever assembled in Pasadena - Blair High School's 1969 football team." Johnson helped Blair High beat the No. 1 ranked team in California, Bishop Amat Memorial High School, for the CIF title.

== College career ==
Johnson played college football for the UCLA Bruins of the University of California, Los Angeles. He was a three-year letterman for the Bruins from 1971 to 1973. He rushed 80 times for 414 yards and two touchdowns in 1971, 140 times for 952 yards and seven touchdowns in 1972, and 150 times for 1,129 yards and 16 touchdowns in 1973. He led the Pacific-8 Conference in both rushing yards and rushing touchdowns during the 1973 season and was named a consensus All-American. Johnson also caught four passes for 47 yards during his college career.

== Professional career ==
Johnson was selected by the San Francisco 49ers of the National Football League (NFL) in the seventh round, with the 166th overall pick, of the 1974 NFL draft and by the Southern California Sun of the World Football League (WFL) in the second round, with the 18th overall pick, of the 1974 WFL draft. He signed with the Sun on January 28, 1974. He played in 19 games for the Sun during the 1974 WFL season, rushing 249 times for 1,008 yards and six touchdowns while also catching 44 passes for 393 yards and one touchdown. The Sun finished the season with a 13–7 record. However, Johnson did not play in the team's playoff game, a 32–14 loss to The Hawaiians, after the Sun failed to pay him on time. Johnson's agent stated "We had a specific clause over and above the contract that says if payment is delinquent, we have the right to declare the players free agents."

Johnson signed with the 49ers on June 9, 1975. He played in 11 games for the 49ers during the 1975 season, recording four carries for 25 yards and six kick returns for 135 yards. He appeared in 11 games, starting one, in 1976, totaling 32 rushing attempts for 99 yards and one touchdown, one reception for 11 yards, and four kick returns for 114 yards. Johnson was released on September 13, 1977, before the start of the 1977 season.

== Personal life ==
Johnson later worked as an official for the Pasadena Fire Department.
