= Fulton Kuykendall =

American football player (1953–2024)

No. 54, 59
- Position: Linebacker

Personal information
- Born: June 10, 1953; Coronado, California, U.S.
- Died: February 15, 2024 (aged 70); Canton, Georgia, U.S.
- Listed height: 6 ft 4 in (1.93 m)
- Listed weight: 225 lb (102 kg)

Career information
- High school: St. Patrick-St. Vincent (Vallejo, California)
- College: UCLA
- NFL draft: 1975: 6th round, 132nd overall pick

Career history
- Atlanta Falcons (1975–1984); San Francisco 49ers (1985)

Awards and highlights
- 2× First-team All-Pac-8 (1973, 1974)

Career NFL statistics
- Sacks: 10
- Fumble recoveries: 9
- Interceptions: 3
- Defensive touchdowns: 1
- Stats at Pro Football Reference

Fulton Gerald Kuykendall (June 10, 1953 – February 15, 2024) was an American professional football player who was a linebacker in the National Football League (NFL), primarily for the Atlanta Falcons. He played college football for the UCLA Bruins and was selected in the sixth round of the 1975 NFL draft. He played in the NFL for the Falcons and the San Francisco 49ers from 1975 to 1985.

== Career ==
Kuykendall graduated from St. Patrick-St. Vincent High School in Vallejo, California, and the University of California, Los Angeles (UCLA), where he played college football for the UCLA Bruins. He played professional football from 1975 to 1985 for the Atlanta Falcons and the San Francisco 49ers. At the time, he was 6'4" and weighed 225 lbs. Kuykendall started primarily at linebacker for the Falcons from 1975 to 1983, making the Pro Football Weekly All-NFC Team in 1978. During his NFL career, Kuykendall played in 124 games, starting 93 of those games.

Nicknamed "Kaptain Krazy" by his teammates, Kuykendall was known for his apparent disregard for his body, launching himself into opposing blockers and ball carriers with fervor. Kuykendall was a member of the famed 1977 Atlanta Falcons "Grits Blitz" defense. He started five games in 1977, but missed the rest of the season after he broke his arm while tackling O.J. Simpson. The "Grits Blitz" defense was notable for allowing the fewest points in a season (129) during the Super Bowl era. As a result, that Falcons defense lives on in NFL lore as one of the top NFL defenses of all time.

== Later life ==
After his career, Kuykendall worked in a catheterization laboratory at Piedmont Hospital, on a cattle farm in Ball Ground, and in real estate. In 2011, Kuykendall filed a lawsuit against the NFL over brain injuries that he suffered during his career that resulted in continuing medical problems. The lawsuit charged that the NFL misinformed its players about the dangers of brain injuries and did not adequately protect them. It became part of the first successful players' lawsuit against the NFL. He underwent 28 surgeries, including a knee replacement and three shoulder replacements.

Kuykendall died of complications from dementia on February 15, 2024, at a memory care facility in Canton, Georgia. He was 70. His widow donated his brain to Boston University's study on chronic traumatic encephalopathy and the rest of his body to the Philadelphia College of Osteopathic Medicine for use in medical school studies.

== Personal life ==
Kuykendall was married to his wife Sherry for 44 years. He was survived by his wife, son and three siblings.
