= Fred McNeill =

American football player (1952–2015)

No. 54
- Position: Linebacker

Personal information
- Born: May 6, 1952; Durham, North Carolina, U.S.
- Died: November 3, 2015 (aged 63); Los Angeles, California, U.S.
- Listed height: 6 ft 2 in (1.88 m)
- Listed weight: 230 lb (104 kg)

Career information
- High school: Baldwin Park (CA)
- College: UCLA
- NFL draft: 1974: 1st round, 17th overall pick

Career history
- Minnesota Vikings (1974–1985)

Awards and highlights
- First-team All-Pac-8 (1973)

Career NFL statistics
- Sacks: 15
- Fumble recoveries: 16
- Interceptions: 7
- Stats at Pro Football Reference

Frederick Arnold McNeill (May 6, 1952 – November 3, 2015) was an American professional football player who was a linebacker for the Minnesota Vikings of the National Football League (NFL) for 12 seasons from 1974 to 1985. He played college football for the UCLA Bruins. In 1973, he was named to the All-Coast/Conference First-team. McNeill was selected by the Vikings in the first round of the 1974 NFL draft with the 17th overall selection. He was the first person to have been diagnosed with CTE while alive and have it confirmed following his death.

== Professional career ==
He played on defenses that led the NFC in fewest points allowed in 1976 and the NFL in fewest total yards allowed in 1975 and fewest passing yards allowed in 1976.

McNeill appeared in 2 Super Bowls with the Vikings, Super Bowl IX and Super Bowl XI. McNeill blocked a punt in Super Bowl XI.

== Later life ==
During his last campaign with the Vikings, he began his studies at the William Mitchell College of Law, where he graduated at the top of his class. He eventually became a partner with a Minneapolis, Minnesota, area law firm following his NFL career.

McNeill was voted into the UCLA Athletics Hall of Fame in 2012.

In his later years he was diagnosed with dementia, and was formally diagnosed with chronic traumatic encephalopathy (CTE) in 2009. In March 2014 he received a diagnosis of amyotrophic lateral sclerosis (Lou Gehrig's Disease). He died of ALS on November 3, 2015, at the age of 63. Following his death Doctor Bennet Omalu conducted an autopsy on McNeil and confirmed the CTE diagnosis. He is one of at least 345 NFL players to be diagnosed after death with CTE, which is caused by repeated hits to the head.

== Personal life ==
McNeill was married to Tia McNeill and they had two sons, Fred Jr. and Gavin. McNeill was the unnamed individual in a study published online in the journal Neurosurgery, where evidence of CTE was observed during scans while he was still alive and confirmed during an autopsy following his death. These results may help in detecting CTE in living individuals and help to improve understanding and treatment.
