= Jim Bright (American football) =

American football player (born 1952)

No. 24
- Position: Safety

Personal information
- Born: May 10, 1952 (age 74); Marion, Louisiana, U.S.
- Listed height: 6 ft 1 in (1.85 m)
- Listed weight: 206 lb (93 kg)

Career information
- High school: Eastside (LA)
- College: UCLA
- NFL draft: 1974: 6th round, 151st overall pick

Career history
- Southern California Sun (1974); Dallas Cowboys (1975)*
- * Offseason or practice squad member only

Awards and highlights
- First-team All-Pac-8 (1973)

James Bright (born May 10, 1952) is an American former football safety in the World Football League (WFL) for the Southern California Sun. He played college football at UCLA.

== Early life ==
Bright attended Eastside High School. He accepted a football scholarship from UCLA to play as a split end.

As a sophomore in 1971, he was moved to safety. He replaced and injured Ron Carver in the starting lineup, for the sixth game against the University of Arizona. He replaced an injured Carver (broken jaw) in the third quarter of the ninth game against Stanford University, registering an interception. He started in the season finale against USC, contributing to UCLA tying the game 7-7.

As a junior in 1972, he became a full-time starter at free safety.

== Professional career ==
Bright was selected by the Dallas Cowboys in the sixth round (151st overall) of the 1974 NFL draft. He instead opted to sign with the Southern California Sun of the World Football League. He was the starter at free safety and had 6 interceptions during the season.

In June 1975, he signed with the Dallas Cowboys. He was released before the start of the season on August 4.
