= 1973 NAIA Division I football season =

American college football season

- Regular season: August–November 1973
- Postseason: December 1–8, 1973
- National Championship: Independence Stadium; Shreveport, LA
- Champions: Abilene Christian

The 1973 NAIA Division I football season was the 18th season of college football sponsored by the NAIA and the fourth season of the league's two-division structure.

The season was played from August to November 1973 and culminated in the 1973 NAIA Champion Bowl, played on December 8, 1973 at Independence Stadium in Shreveport, Louisiana.

Abilene Christian defeated Elon in the Champion Bowl, 42–14, to win their first NAIA national title.

== Conference realignment ==
=== Conference changes ===
- This was the final season for the Oklahoma Collegiate Conference. After sixty-five season of football dating back to 1929, the OCC disbanded after the end of play, with six of its members subsequently departing to form the Oklahoma Intercollegiate Conference for the 1974 season.

== Conference standings ==
1973 Arkansas Intercollegiate Conference football standings
	Conf.					Overall
Team	W		L		T	W		L		T
No. 7 Henderson State $	6	–	0	–	0	10	–	1	–	0
No. T–17 Southern Arkansas	4	–	2	–	0	8	–	2	–	0
Harding	4	–	2	–	0	7	–	3	–	0
State College of Arkansas	3	–	3	–	0	6	–	5	–	0
Ouachita Baptist	2	–	4	–	0	5	–	5	–	0
Arkansas Tech	2	–	4	–	0	4	–	7	–	0
Arkansas–Monticello	0	–	6	–	0	2	–	8	–	0
$ – Conference champion; Rankings from NAIA Division I poll

1973 Carolinas Conference football standings
	Conf.					Overall
Team	W		L		T	W		L		T
No. 2/10 Elon $^	4	–	0	–	0	12	–	1	–	0
Lenoir Rhyne	2	–	1	–	0	5	–	5	–	1
Mars Hill	2	–	2	–	0	5	–	6	–	0
Catawba	1	–	3	–	0	5	–	5	–	0
Guilford	0	–	3	–	0	1	–	9	–	0
$ – Conference champion; ^ – NAIA Division I playoff participant; Rankings from NAIA Division I poll and AP small college poll

1973 Evergreen Conference football standings
	Conf.					Overall
Team	W		L		T	W		L		T
No. 16 Central Washington $	5	–	1	–	0	7	–	2	–	0
Eastern Oregon	4	–	2	–	0	7	–	2	–	0
Oregon College	4	–	2	–	0	6	–	3	–	0
Southern Oregon	4	–	2	–	0	6	–	3	–	0
Eastern Washington	2	–	4	–	0	5	–	4	–	0
Western Washington	1	–	5	–	0	1	–	7	–	0
Oregon Tech	1	–	5	–	0	1	–	8	–	0
$ – Conference champion; Rankings from NAIA Division I poll

1973 Great Plains Athletic Conference football standings
	Conf.					Overall
Team	W		L		T	W		L		T
No. T–17 Emporia State +	4	–	1	–	0	7	–	2	–	0
Northern Colorado +	4	–	1	–	0	7	–	2	–	0
Fort Hays State	2	–	3	–	0	5	–	4	–	0
Washburn	2	–	3	–	0	3	–	6	–	1
Pittsburg State	2	–	3	–	0	3	–	7	–	0
Southern Colorado	1	–	4	–	0	3	–	7	–	0
+ – Conference co-champions; Rankings from NAIA Division I poll

1973 Gulf South Conference football standings
	Conf.					Overall
Team	W		L		T	W		L		T
No. T–17 Troy State $	6	–	1	–	0	7	–	2	–	1
No. 4 Jacksonville State	5	–	2	–	0	7	–	2	–	0
Delta State	6	–	3	–	0	8	–	3	–	0
Livingston	4	–	3	–	1	6	–	3	–	1
Northwestern State	3	–	4	–	0	5	–	6	–	0
Mississippi College	3	–	4	–	0	4	–	6	–	0
Southeastern Louisiana	3	–	4	–	0	4	–	6	–	0
Florence State	3	–	6	–	0	4	–	6	–	0
Nicholls State	2	–	7	–	0	2	–	9	–	0
Tennessee–Martin	1	–	5	–	1	2	–	8	–	1
$ – Conference champion; Rankings from NAIA Division I poll

1973 Lone Star Conference football standings
	Conf.					Overall
Team	W		L		T	W		L		T
No. 1/7 Abilene Christian $^	9	–	0	–	0	11	–	1	–	0
No. 8 Howard Payne	8	–	1	–	0	8	–	3	–	0
Stephen F. Austin	6	–	3	–	0	9	–	3	–	0
East Texas State	6	–	3	–	0	7	–	4	–	0
Angelo State	5	–	4	–	0	5	–	4	–	2
Southwest Texas State	3	–	6	–	0	4	–	6	–	0
Sul Ross	3	–	6	–	0	3	–	7	–	0
Sam Houston State	2	–	7	–	0	2	–	8	–	0
Texas A&I	2	–	7	–	0	2	–	8	–	0
Tarleton State	1	–	8	–	0	1	–	9	–	0
$ – Conference champion; ^ – NAIA Division I playoff participant; Rankings from NAIA Division I poll and AP small college poll

1973 Minnesota Intercollegiate Athletic Conference football standings
	Conf.					Overall
Team	W		L		T	W		L		T
No. 11 St. Thomas (MN) +	6	–	1	–	0	9	–	1	–	0
No. 9 Minnesota–Duluth +	6	–	1	–	0	8	–	1	–	0
Augsburg	5	–	2	–	0	7	–	2	–	0
Gustavus Adolphus	4	–	3	–	0	5	–	5	–	0
Concordia–Moorhead	3	–	4	–	0	5	–	5	–	0
Saint John's (MN)	3	–	4	–	0	4	–	4	–	0
Hamline	1	–	6	–	0	3	–	6	–	0
Macalester	0	–	7	–	0	1	–	9	–	0
+ – Conference co-champions; Rankings from NAIA Division I poll

1973 Nebraska College Conference football standings
	Conf.					Overall
Team	W		L		T	W		L		T
Kearney State +	2	–	1	–	0	6	–	3	–	0
Peru State +	2	–	1	–	0	5	–	5	–	0
Wayne State (NE)	1	–	2	–	0	6	–	2	–	1
Chadron State	1	–	2	–	0	7	–	3	–	0
+ – Conference co-champions

1973 Northern Intercollegiate Conference football standings
	Conf.					Overall
Team	W		L		T	W		L		T
Moorhead State $	5	–	1	–	0	7	–	3	–	0
Michigan Tech	4	–	2	–	0	5	–	4	–	1
St. Cloud State	4	–	2	–	0	4	–	6	–	0
Bemidji State	2	–	4	–	0	5	–	4	–	0
Southwest State (MN)	2	–	4	–	0	4	–	6	–	0
Minnesota Morris	2	–	4	–	0	3	–	6	–	0
Winona State	2	–	4	–	0	3	–	7	–	0
$ – Conference champion

1973 Oklahoma Collegiate Conference football standings
	Conf.					Overall
Team	W		L		T	W		L		T
No. 3 Langston $^	8	–	0	–	0	11	–	1	–	0
No. 12 Northeastern State	6	–	2	–	0	7	–	2	–	0
SE Oklahoma State	5	–	3	–	0	6	–	4	–	0
Central State (OK)	5	–	3	–	0	6	–	4	–	1
Cameron	4	–	4	–	0	5	–	5	–	0
East Central	3	–	4	–	0	4	–	7	–	0
Panhandle	2	–	6	–	0	3	–	7	–	1
SW Oklahoma State	2	–	6	–	0	3	–	7	–	0
NW Oklahoma State	0	–	7	–	1	1	–	8	–	1
$ – Conference champion; ^ – NAIA Division I playoff participant; Rankings from NAIA Division I poll

1973 Pennsylvania State Athletic Conference football standings
	Conf.					Overall
Team	W		L		T	W		L		T
East Division
West Chester xy	4	–	0	–	0	5	–	5	–	0
East Stroudsburg	5	–	1	–	0	6	–	1	–	1
Millersville	4	–	2	–	0	7	–	2	–	0
Cheyney	3	–	2	–	0	5	–	4	–	0
Bloomsburg	2	–	4	–	0	4	–	5	–	0
Kutztown	1	–	5	–	0	2	–	7	–	0
Mansfield	0	–	5	–	0	1	–	7	–	0
West Division
No. T–20 Slippery Rock xy$	5	–	0	–	0	8	–	2	–	0
Clarion	3	–	2	–	0	5	–	4	–	0
Edinboro	3	–	2	–	0	4	–	4	–	1
Lock Haven	2	–	3	–	0	2	–	7	–	0
California (PA)	1	–	4	–	0	3	–	6	–	0
Shippensburg	1	–	4	–	0	2	–	7	–	0
Indiana (PA) *	0	–	0	–	0	4	–	5	–	0
Championship: Slippery Rock 28, West Chester 14
$ – Conference champion; x – Division champion/co-champions; y – Championship game participant; * – Ineligible for conference title; Rankings from NAIA Division I poll

1973 Rocky Mountain Athletic Conference football standings
	Conf.					Overall
Team	W		L		T	W		L		T
Western State (CO) $	5	–	1	–	0	6	–	3	–	0
Adams State	4	–	2	–	0	6	–	3	–	0
Southern Utah	4	–	2	–	0	5	–	4	–	0
Fort Lewis	3	–	3	–	0	4	–	5	–	0
Western New Mexico	3	–	3	–	0	3	–	5	–	0
Westminster (UT)	2	–	4	–	0	3	–	6	–	0
Colorado Mines	0	–	6	–	0	0	–	9	–	0
$ – Conference champion

1973 Southwestern Athletic Conference football standings
	Conf.					Overall
Team	W		L		T	W		L		T
No. 5/7 Grambling +^	5	–	1	–	0	10	–	3	–	0
No. 10 Jackson State +	5	–	1	–	0	9	–	2	–	0
No. T–20 Alcorn A&M	3	–	2	–	1	7	–	2	–	1
Southern	3	–	3	–	0	6	–	4	–	0
Texas Southern	2	–	3	–	1	5	–	5	–	1
Mississippi Valley State	2	–	4	–	0	3	–	5	–	0
Prairie View A&M	0	–	6	–	0	2	–	6	–	1
+ – Conference co-champions; ^ – NCAA Division II playoff participant; Rankings from NAIA Division I poll and AP small college poll

1973 West Virginia Intercollegiate Athletic Conference football standings
	Conf.					Overall
Team	W		L		T	W		L		T
Northern Division
Fairmont State xy$	3	–	0	–	0	6	–	3	–	1
West Liberty State	2	–	1	–	1	3	–	5	–	1
Salem	2	–	2	–	0	6	–	4	–	0
Shepherd	1	–	2	–	0	6	–	4	–	0
West Virginia Wesleyan	0	–	3	–	1	2	–	6	–	1
Southern Division
No. 2 Glenville State xy^	4	–	0	–	0	10	–	2	–	0
Bluefield State	3	–	1	–	0	4	–	5	–	0
West Virginia State	2	–	2	–	0	5	–	5	–	0
West Virginia Tech	1	–	3	–	0	4	–	5	–	0
Concord	0	–	4	–	0	0	–	9	–	0
Championship: Fairmont State 21, Glenville State 7
$ – Conference champion; x – Division champion/co-champions; y – Championship game participant; ^ – NAIA Division II playoff participant Conference standings based on power ratings; Rankings from NAIA Division II poll

1973 Wisconsin State University Conference football standings
	Conf.					Overall
Team	W		L		T	W		L		T
No. 6 Wisconsin–La Crosse $^	7	–	1	–	0	9	–	2	–	0
No. 14 Wisconsin–Platteville	6	–	1	–	1	8	–	1	–	1
Wisconsin–Whitewater	4	–	2	–	2	6	–	2	–	2
Wisconsin–Eau Claire	4	–	4	–	0	5	–	5	–	0
Wisconsin–Oshkosh	4	–	4	–	0	4	–	6	–	0
Wisconsin–River Falls	3	–	4	–	1	4	–	5	–	1
Wisconsin–Stevens Point	3	–	5	–	0	4	–	6	–	0
Wisconsin–Superior	2	–	6	–	0	2	–	8	–	0
Wisconsin–Stout	1	–	7	–	0	1	–	9	–	0
$ – Conference champion; ^ – NAIA Division I playoff participant; Rankings from NAIA Division I poll

1973 NAIA Division I independents football records
	Conf.			Overall
Team	W	L	T	W		L		T
No. 15 Hillsdale		–		7	–	2	–	0
No. 13 Carson–Newman		–		6	–	3	–	0
Eastern New Mexico		–		6	–	4	–	0
Wofford		–		3	–	6	–	1
Kentucky State		–		3	–	8	–	0
Presbyterian		–		3	–	8	–	0
Rankings from NAIA Division I poll

== Postseason ==
Semifinals; December 1, 1973
Wisconsin–La Crosse	24
Elon*	35
Langston	6
Abilene Christian*	34

1973 Champion Bowl; December 8, 1973; Shreveport, LA
Elon	14
Abilene Christian	42

== See also ==
- 1973 NAIA Division II football season
- 1973 NCAA Division I football season
- 1973 NCAA Division II football season
- 1973 NCAA Division III football season
