= Allen Boren =

American football player and coach (1934–2018)

Biographical details
- Born: March 28, 1934; Carthage, Texas, U.S.
- Died: November 14, 2018 (aged 84)

Playing career
- 1953–1955: Sam Houston State
- Position: Quarterback

Coaching career (HC unless noted)
- 1959–1962: Bellville HS (TX)
- 1963–1968: Edna HS (TX)
- 1969–1971: Humble HS (TX)
- 1972–1973: Sam Houston State

Head coaching record
- Overall: 7–14 (college); 99–43–1 (high school)

Allen Moore Boren (March 28, 1934 – November 14, 2018) was an American football player and coach. He served as the head football coach at Sam Houston State University from 1972 to 1973, compiling a record of 7–14.

Boren played football, baseball, track, and basketball at Carthage High School and later football and baseball at Sam Houston State University for coach Paul Pierce. After graduation, he started his coaching career as an assistant at Wharton High School in 1956, before moving on to Sweeny High School. In 1959, Boren landed his first head coaching job at Bellville High School, a Class 2A school between Houston and Austin, Texas. Two district titles, one Bi-Dist. and one state runner up 37–9–1. Later he also coached at Edna High School. Two Dist titles and one state runner up. 44-21 and Humble High School. One district title 18–13. In 1972, Boren left Humble to succeed Tom Page as head coach at his alma mater. After two losing seasons, 5–6 in 1972 and 2–8 in 1973, Boren resigned to become director of athletics in the Klein School Dist. in north Harris County. During his 17 years in Klein, the district grew from one 4A high school to three 5A high schools (Klein, Klein Forest and Klein Collins) and the number of coaches grew from 23 to 126. Boren retired in 1991. He is a member of the following Halls of Honor: The Texas High School Coaches, Texas High School Athletic Directors, Sam Houston State Bearkat and Bellville High School Brahma.

== Head coaching record ==
=== College ===
Year	Team	Overall	Conference	Standing	Bowl/playoffs
Sam Houston State Bearkats (Lone Star Conference) (1972–1973)
1972	Sam Houston State	5–6	4–4	T–4th	
1973	Sam Houston State	2–8	2–7	T–8th	
Sam Houston State:		7–14	6–11		
Total:		7–14			
