= 1973 Morgan State Bears football team =

American college football season

1973 Morgan State Bears football
- Conference: Mid-Eastern Athletic Conference
- Record: 6–3 (4–2 MEAC)
- Head coach: Earl Banks (14th season)
- Defensive coordinator: Thomas Morris (1st season)
- Home stadium: Hughes Stadium

1973 Mid-Eastern Athletic Conference football standings
	Conf.					Overall
Team	W		L		T	W		L		T
North Carolina Central $	5	–	1	–	0	7	–	4	–	0
South Carolina State	4	–	1	–	1	7	–	3	–	1
Howard	4	–	2	–	0	8	–	2	–	0
Morgan State	4	–	2	–	0	6	–	3	–	0
Maryland Eastern Shore	2	–	4	–	0	4	–	5	–	0
North Carolina A&T	1	–	4	–	1	4	–	6	–	1
Delaware State	0	–	6	–	0	0	–	11	–	0
$ – Conference champion

The 1973 Morgan State Bears football team represented Morgan State College (now known as Morgan State University) as a member of the Mid-Eastern Athletic Conference (MEAC) during the 1973 NCAA Division II football season. Led by 14th-year head coach Earl Banks, the Bears compiled an overall record of 6–3 and a mark of 4–2 in conference play, and finished tied for third in the MEAC.

== Schedule ==
Date	Opponent	Site	Result	Attendance	Source
September 15	vs. Alabama State*	Soldier Field; Chicago, IL (Chicago Urban League Classic)	W 32–0	25,000	
September 22	vs. Grambling*	Yankee Stadium; Bronx, NY (Whitney M. Young Memorial Classic)	L 14–31	64,243	
September 29	at North Carolina Central	Durham County Memorial Stadium; Durham, NC	L 8–11	9,000	
October 6	Maryland Eastern Shore	Hughes Stadium; Baltimore, MD	W 24–21	4,350	
October 13	at South Carolina State	State College Stadium; Orangeburg, SC	L 0–20	4,800	
October 20	at Delaware State	Alumni Stadium; Dover, DE	W 34–6	4,311	
October 27	North Carolina A&T	Hughes Stadium; Baltimore, MD	W 16–10	8,490–15,445	
November 5	at Howard	RFK Stadium; Washington, DC (rivalry)	W 27–7	25,000–30,103	
November 17	Virginia State*	Hughes Stadium; Baltimore, MD	W 39–6	5,445	
*Non-conference game
