= 1973 South Carolina State Bulldogs football team =

American college football season

1973 South Carolina State Bulldogs football
- Conference: Mid-Eastern Athletic Conference
- Record: 7–3–1 (4–1–1 MEAC)
- Head coach: Willie Jeffries (1st season)
- Home stadium: State College Stadium

1973 Mid-Eastern Athletic Conference football standings
	Conf.					Overall
Team	W		L		T	W		L		T
North Carolina Central $	5	–	1	–	0	7	–	4	–	0
South Carolina State	4	–	1	–	1	7	–	3	–	1
Howard	4	–	2	–	0	8	–	2	–	0
Morgan State	4	–	2	–	0	6	–	3	–	0
Maryland Eastern Shore	2	–	4	–	0	4	–	5	–	0
North Carolina A&T	1	–	4	–	1	4	–	6	–	1
Delaware State	0	–	6	–	0	0	–	11	–	0
$ – Conference champion

The 1973 South Carolina State Bulldogs football team represented South Carolina State College (now known as South Carolina State University) as a member of the Mid-Eastern Athletic Conference (MEAC) during the 1973 NCAA Division II football season. Led by first-year head coach Willie Jeffries, the Bulldogs compiled an overall record of 7–3–1, with a mark of 4–1–1 in conference play, and finished second in the MEAC.

== Schedule ==
Date	Opponent	Site	Result	Attendance	Source
September 8	at Bethune–Cookman*	Municipal Stadium; Daytona Beach, FL	L 7–13	6,800–7,000	
September 15	North Carolina A&T	State College Stadium; Orangeburg, SC (rivalry)	T 14–14	8,500–8,600	
September 22	Howard	State College Stadium; Orangeburg, SC	L 7–21	4,000–7,200	
September 29	at Virginia Union*	Hovey Field; Richmond, VA	W 12–0	4,000	
October 13	Morgan State	State College Stadium; Orangeburg, SC	W 20–0	4,800	
October 20	at Kentucky State*	Alumni Field; Frankfort, KY	W 17–8	6,500	
October 27	at North Carolina Central	Durham County Memorial Stadium; Durham, NC	W 24–3	10,000–14,000	
November 3	at Maryland Eastern Shore	Princess Anne, MD	W 30–7	1,800	
November 10	Alabama A&M*^{†}	State College Stadium; Orangeburg, SC	W 35–24	13,750	
November 17	Delaware State	State College Stadium; Orangeburg, SC	W 27–0	4,000	
December 8	vs. Florida A&M*	Miami Orange Bowl; Miami, FL (Orange Blossom Classic)	L 12–23	18,996	
*Non-conference game; ^{†}Homecoming
