= List of Cal State Los Angeles Diablos in the NFL draft =

This is a list of Cal State Los Angeles Diablos football players in the NFL draft.

== Key ==
B	Back	K	Kicker	NT	Nose tackle
C	Center	LB	Linebacker	FB	Fullback
DB	Defensive back	P	Punter	HB	Halfback
DE	Defensive end	QB	Quarterback	WR	Wide receiver
DT	Defensive tackle	RB	Running back	G	Guard
E	End	T	Offensive tackle	TE	Tight end

== Draft picks ==
Year	Round	Pick	Overall	Player	Team	Position
1958	9	4	101	Ralph Anderson	Chicago Bears	E
1959	5	9	57	John Adams	Chicago Bears	B
1959	18	4	208	Dave Halden	Detroit Lions	T
1960	2	0	0	Dave Ross	New York Titans	E
1960	12	3	135	Dave Ross	Detroit Lions	E
1961	5	14	70	Ron Puckett	Detroit Lions	T
1961	18	1	239	Bob Voight	Minnesota Vikings	DT
1962	13	6	150	Joe Womack	Pittsburgh Steelers	B
1962	19	9	261	Fred Gillett	Baltimore Colts	B
1963	13	11	179	Harold Gray	Pittsburgh Steelers	LB
1965	2	13	27	Walter Johnson	Cleveland Browns	DT
1965	13	2	170	Howard Kindig	Philadelphia Eagles	C
1965	15	4	200	Art Robinson	Chicago Bears	B
1965	17	5	229	Mitch Johnson	Dallas Cowboys	T
1966	2	9	25	Don Davis	New York Giants	DT
1966	7	2	97	George Youngblood	Los Angeles Rams	DB
1966	11	10	150	Jim Weatherwax	Green Bay Packers	DT
1966	14	2	202	Terry Parks	Los Angeles Rams	T
1967	16	17	410	Philip Spiller	St. Louis Cardinals	DB
1976	15	26	249	Malcolm Campbell	Los Angeles Rams	WR
