= 1973 Delaware State Hornets football team =

American college football season

1973 Delaware State Hornets football
- Conference: Mid-Eastern Athletic Conference
- Record: 0–11 (0–6 MEAC)
- Head coach: Arnold Jeter (7th season)
- Home stadium: Alumni Stadium

1973 Mid-Eastern Athletic Conference football standings
	Conf.					Overall
Team	W		L		T	W		L		T
North Carolina Central $	5	–	1	–	0	7	–	4	–	0
South Carolina State	4	–	1	–	1	7	–	3	–	1
Howard	4	–	2	–	0	8	–	2	–	0
Morgan State	4	–	2	–	0	6	–	3	–	0
Maryland Eastern Shore	2	–	4	–	0	4	–	5	–	0
North Carolina A&T	1	–	4	–	1	4	–	6	–	1
Delaware State	0	–	6	–	0	0	–	11	–	0
$ – Conference champion

The 1973 Delaware State Hornets football team represented Delaware State College—now known as Delaware State University—as a member of the Mid-Eastern Athletic Conference (MEAC) in the 1973 NCAA Division II football season. Led by seventh-year head coach Arnold Jeter, the Hornets compiled an overall record of 0–11 and a mark of 0–6 in conference play, placing last out of seven teams in the MEAC. Their 0–11 record is tied for the worst in school history, with the 1998 and 2016 teams.

== Schedule ==
Date	Opponent	Site	Result	Attendance	Source
September 8	vs. Virginia State*	Hartford, CT (Ujima Classic)	L 0–21	7,000	
September 15	C. W. Post*	Alumni Stadium; Dover, DE	L 0–13		
September 22	Millersville*	Alumni Stadium; Dover, DE	L 7–14		
September 29	at Clarion*	Clarion, PA	L 14–34	6,000	
October 6	Howard^{†}	Alumni Stadium; Dover, DE	L 6–29	3,000–4,000	
October 13	at North Carolina Central	Durham County Memorial Stadium; Durham, NC	L 7–32		
October 20	Morgan State	Alumni Stadium; Dover, DE	L 6–34	4,311	
October 27	at Maryland Eastern Shore	Princess Anne, MD	L 14–20		
November 2	at Hofstra*	Hofstra Stadium; Hempstead, NY	L 14–26		
November 10	North Carolina A&T	Alumni Stadium; Dover, DE	L 12–27	150–1,900	
November 17	at South Carolina State	State College Stadium; Orangeburg, SC	L 0–27		
*Non-conference game; ^{†}Homecoming
