= 1973 Howard Bison football team =

American college football season

1973 Howard Bison football
- Conference: Mid-Eastern Athletic Conference
- Record: 8–2 (4–2 MEAC)
- Head coach: Ed Wyche (1st season)
- Home stadium: Howard Stadium; RFK Stadium

1973 Mid-Eastern Athletic Conference football standings
| | Conf. | | | | | Overall |
| Team | W | | L | | T | W | | L | | T |
|---|---|---|---|---|---|---|---|---|---|---|
| North Carolina Central $ | 5 | – | 1 | – | 0 | 7 | – | 4 | – | 0 |
| South Carolina State | 4 | – | 1 | – | 1 | 7 | – | 3 | – | 1 |
| Howard | 4 | – | 2 | – | 0 | 8 | – | 2 | – | 0 |
| Morgan State | 4 | – | 2 | – | 0 | 6 | – | 3 | – | 0 |
| Maryland Eastern Shore | 2 | – | 4 | – | 0 | 4 | – | 5 | – | 0 |
| North Carolina A&T | 1 | – | 4 | – | 1 | 4 | – | 6 | – | 1 |
| Delaware State | 0 | – | 6 | – | 0 | 0 | – | 11 | – | 0 |
$ – Conference champion

The 1973 Howard Bison football team represented Howard University as a member of the Mid-Eastern Athletic Conference (MEAC) during the 1973 NCAA Division II football season. Led by first-year head coach Ed Wyche, the Bison compiled an overall record of 8–2, with a mark of 4–2 in conference play, and finished tied for third in the MEAC.

== Schedule ==
| Date | Opponent | Site | Result | Attendance | Source |
|---|---|---|---|---|---|
| September 8 | at Morris Brown* | Herndon Stadium; Atlanta, GA | W 14–13 | 3,000 | |
| September 15 | Maryland Eastern Shore | Howard Stadium; Washington, DC | W 38–14 | 6,989 | |
| September 22 | at South Carolina State | State College Stadium; Orangeburg, SC | W 21–7 | 4,000–7,200 | |
| September 29 | Virginia State* | Howard Stadium; Washington, DC | W 41–20 | 7,896 | |
| October 6 | at Delaware State | Alumni Stadium; Dover, DE | W 29–6 | 3,000–4,000 | |
| October 13 | West Virginia State* | Howard Stadium; Washington, DC | W 46–16 | 11,000 | |
| October 20 | at North Carolina A&T | World War Memorial Stadium; Greensboro, NC | W 43–7 | 7,300–7,900 | |
| October 27 | Hampton* | Howard Stadium; Washington, DC (rivalry) | W 51–0 | 6,800 | |
| November 5 | Morgan State | RFK Stadium; Washington, DC (rivalry) | L 7–27 | 25,000–31,103 | |
| November 10 | at North Carolina Central | Durham County Memorial Stadium; Durham, NC | L 7–10 | 7,165–9,800 | |
*Non-conference game
