= 1973 North Carolina Central Eagles football team =

American college football season

1973 North Carolina Central Eagles football

MEAC champion
- Conference: Mid-Eastern Athletic Conference
- Record: 7–4 (5–1 MEAC)
- Head coach: Willie Smith (1st season)
- Home stadium: Durham County Memorial Stadium

1973 Mid-Eastern Athletic Conference football standings
	Conf.					Overall
Team	W		L		T	W		L		T
North Carolina Central $	5	–	1	–	0	7	–	4	–	0
South Carolina State	4	–	1	–	1	7	–	3	–	1
Howard	4	–	2	–	0	8	–	2	–	0
Morgan State	4	–	2	–	0	6	–	3	–	0
Maryland Eastern Shore	2	–	4	–	0	4	–	5	–	0
North Carolina A&T	1	–	4	–	1	4	–	6	–	1
Delaware State	0	–	6	–	0	0	–	11	–	0
$ – Conference champion

The 1973 North Carolina Central Eagles football team represented North Carolina Central University as a member of the Mid-Eastern Athletic Conference (MEAC) during the 1973 NCAA Division II football season. Led by first-year head coach Willie Smith, the Eagles compiled an overall record of 7–4, with a mark of 5–1 in conference play, and finished as MEAC champion.

== Schedule ==
Date	Opponent	Site	Result	Attendance	Source
September 8	at Winston-Salem State*	Bowman Gray Stadium; Winston-Salem, NC	W 21–13		
September 15	vs. Florida A&M*	Atlanta Stadium; Atlanta, GA	W 9–3		
September 21	Alcorn A&M*	Durham County Memorial Stadium; Durham, NC	L 8–10	8,500–8,600	
September 29	Morgan State	Durham County Memorial Stadium; Durham, NC	W 11–8	9,000	
October 6	at Virginia State*	Rogers Stadium; Ettrick, VA	L 2–23		
October 13	Delaware State	Durham County Memorial Stadium; Durham, NC	W 32–7		
October 20	at Maryland Eastern Shore	Princess Anne, MD	W 21–20		
October 27	South Carolina State^{†}	Durham County Memorial Stadium; Durham, NC	L 3–24	10,000–14,000	
November 3	at Johnson C. Smith*	American Legion Memorial Stadium; Charlotte, NC	L 7–15	15,000	
November 10	Howard	Durham County Memorial Stadium; Durham, NC	W 10–7	7,165–9,800	
November 17	at North Carolina A&T	World War Memorial Stadium; Greensboro, NC (rivalry)	W 16–6	15,730	
*Non-conference game; ^{†}Homecoming
