= 1973 Southwest Texas State Bobcats football team =

American college football season

1973 Southwest Texas State Bobcats football
- Conference: Lone Star Conference
- Record: 4–6 (3–6 LSC)
- Head coach: Bill Miller (9th season)
- Home stadium: Evans Field

1973 Lone Star Conference football standings
	Conf.					Overall
Team	W		L		T	W		L		T
No. 1/7 Abilene Christian $^	9	–	0	–	0	11	–	1	–	0
No. 8 Howard Payne	8	–	1	–	0	8	–	3	–	0
Stephen F. Austin	6	–	3	–	0	9	–	3	–	0
East Texas State	6	–	3	–	0	7	–	4	–	0
Angelo State	5	–	4	–	0	5	–	4	–	2
Southwest Texas State	3	–	6	–	0	4	–	6	–	0
Sul Ross	3	–	6	–	0	3	–	7	–	0
Sam Houston State	2	–	7	–	0	2	–	8	–	0
Texas A&I	2	–	7	–	0	2	–	8	–	0
Tarleton State	1	–	8	–	0	1	–	9	–	0
$ – Conference champion; ^ – NAIA Division I playoff participant; Rankings from NAIA Division I poll and AP small college poll

The 1973 Southwest Texas State Bobcats football team was an American football team that represented Southwest Texas State University (now known as Texas State University) during the 1973 NAIA football season as a member of the Lone Star Conference (LSC). In their ninth year under head coach Bill Miller, the team compiled an overall record of 4–6, with a mark of 3–6 in conference play.

== Schedule ==
Date	Opponent	Site	Result	Source
September 15	at Texas Lutheran*	Matador Field; Seguin, TX	W 21–0	
September 22	at Angelo State	San Angelo Stadium; San Angelo, TX	L 0–16	
September 29	Abilene Christian	Evans Field; San Marcos, TX	L 7–41	
October 6	Tarleton State	Evans Field; San Marcos, TX	W 33–7	
October 13	at Stephen F. Austin	Lumberjack Stadium; Nacogdoches, TX	L 13–17	
October 20	Sam Houston State	Evans Field; San Marcos, TX (rivalry)	W 28–7	
October 27	East Texas State	Evans Field; San Marcos, TX	L 14–28	
November 3	at Howard Payne	Cen-Tex Stadium; Brownwood, TX	L 7–33	
November 10	Sul Ross	Evans Field; San Marcos, TX	W 28–0	
November 17	at Texas A&I	Javelina Stadium; Kingsville, TX	L 10–49	
*Non-conference game
