= 1973 North Carolina A&T Aggies football team =

American college football season

1973 North Carolina A&T Aggies football
- Conference: Mid-Eastern Athletic Conference
- Record: 4–6–1 (1–4–1 MEAC)
- Head coach: Hornsby Howell (6th season)
- Home stadium: World War Memorial Stadium

1973 Mid-Eastern Athletic Conference football standings
	Conf.					Overall
Team	W		L		T	W		L		T
North Carolina Central $	5	–	1	–	0	7	–	4	–	0
South Carolina State	4	–	1	–	1	7	–	3	–	1
Howard	4	–	2	–	0	8	–	2	–	0
Morgan State	4	–	2	–	0	6	–	3	–	0
Maryland Eastern Shore	2	–	4	–	0	4	–	5	–	0
North Carolina A&T	1	–	4	–	1	4	–	6	–	1
Delaware State	0	–	6	–	0	0	–	11	–	0
$ – Conference champion

The 1973 North Carolina A&T Aggies football team represented North Carolina A&T State University as a member of the Mid-Eastern Athletic Conference (MEAC) during the 1973 NCAA Division II football season. Led by sixth-year head coach Hornsby Howell, the Aggies compiled an overall record of 4–6–1, with a mark of 1–4–1 in conference play, and finished sixth in the MEAC.

== Schedule ==
Date	Opponent	Site	Result	Attendance	Source
September 8	at Elizabeth City State*	Elizabeth City, NC	W 10–0	3,300	
September 15	at South Carolina State	State College Stadium; Orangeburg, SC (rivalry)	T 14–14	8,500–8,600	
September 22	Florida A&M*	World War Memorial Stadium; Greensboro, NC	W 21–14	7,446	
September 29	Johnson C. Smith*	World War Memorial Stadium; Greensboro, NC	L 11–15	6,282	
October 6	at Norfolk State*	Foreman Field; Norfolk, VA	W 26–12	5,940	
October 13	Maryland Eastern Shore	World War Memorial Stadium; Greensboro, NC	L 15–22	18,940–20,000	
October 20	Howard	World War Memorial Stadium; Greensboro, NC	L 7–43	7,300–7,900	
October 27	at Morgan State	Hughes Stadium; Baltimore, MD	L 10–16	8,490–15,445	
November 3	at Grambling*	Grambling Stadium; Grambling, LA	L 6–62	3,731–6,000	
November 10	at Delaware State	Alumni Stadium; Dover, DE	W 27–12	150–1,900	
November 17	North Carolina Central	World War Memorial Stadium; Greensboro, NC (rivalry)	L 6–16	15,730	
*Non-conference game
