= 1973 Maryland Eastern Shore Hawks football team =

American college football season

1973 Maryland Eastern Shore Hawks football
- Conference: Mid-Eastern Athletic Conference
- Record: 4–5 (2–4 MEAC)
- Head coach: Harold Gray (1st season)

1973 Mid-Eastern Athletic Conference football standings
	Conf.					Overall
Team	W		L		T	W		L		T
North Carolina Central $	5	–	1	–	0	7	–	4	–	0
South Carolina State	4	–	1	–	1	7	–	3	–	1
Howard	4	–	2	–	0	8	–	2	–	0
Morgan State	4	–	2	–	0	6	–	3	–	0
Maryland Eastern Shore	2	–	4	–	0	4	–	5	–	0
North Carolina A&T	1	–	4	–	1	4	–	6	–	1
Delaware State	0	–	6	–	0	0	–	11	–	0
$ – Conference champion

The 1973 Maryland Eastern Shore Hawks football team represented the University of Maryland Eastern Shore as a member of the Mid-Eastern Athletic Conference (MEAC) during the 1973 NCAA Division II football season. Led by first-year head coach Harold Gray, the Hawks compiled an overall record of 4–5, with a mark of 2–4 in conference play, and finished fifth in the MEAC.

== Schedule ==
Date	Opponent	Site	Result	Attendance	Source
September 8	at Johnson C. Smith*	American Legion Memorial Stadium; Charlotte, NC	L 13–19		
September 15	at Howard	Howard Stadium; Washington, DC	L 14–38	6,989	
September 22	Kentucky State*	Princess Anne, MD	W 15–8		
October 6	at Morgan State	Hughes Stadium; Baltimore, MD	L 21–24	4,350	
October 13	at North Carolina A&T	World War Memorial Stadium; Greensboro, NC	W 22–15	18,940–20,000	
October 20	North Carolina Central^{†}	Princess Anne, MD	L 20–21		
October 27	Delaware State	Princess Anne, MD	W 20–14		
November 3	South Carolina State	Princess Anne, MD	L 7–30	1,800	
November 10	Federal City*	Princess Anne, MD	W 34–0		
*Non-conference game; ^{†}Homecoming
