= 1973 Alcorn A&M Braves football team =

American college football season

1973 Alcorn A&M Braves football
- Conference: Southwestern Athletic Conference
- Record: 7–2–1 (3–2–1 SWAC)
- Head coach: Marino Casem (10th season)
- Home stadium: Henderson Stadium

1973 Southwestern Athletic Conference football standings
	Conf.					Overall
Team	W		L		T	W		L		T
No. 5/7 Grambling +^	5	–	1	–	0	10	–	3	–	0
No. 10 Jackson State +	5	–	1	–	0	9	–	2	–	0
No. T–20 Alcorn A&M	3	–	2	–	1	7	–	2	–	1
Southern	3	–	3	–	0	6	–	4	–	0
Texas Southern	2	–	3	–	1	5	–	5	–	1
Mississippi Valley State	2	–	4	–	0	3	–	5	–	0
Prairie View A&M	0	–	6	–	0	2	–	6	–	1
+ – Conference co-champions; ^ – NCAA Division II playoff participant; Rankings from NAIA Division I poll and AP small college poll

The 1973 Alcorn A&M Braves football team represented Alcorn A&M College (now known as Alcorn State University) as a member of the Southwestern Athletic Conference (SWAC) during the 1973 NCAA Division II football season. Led by tenth-year head coach Marino Casem, the Braves compiled an overall record of 7–2–1, with a conference record of 3–2–1, and finished third in the SWAC.

== Schedule ==
Date	Opponent	Site	Result	Attendance	Source
September 8	at Arkansas–Pine Bluff*	Pumphrey Stadium; Pine Bluff, AR	W 31–14	8,500	
September 15	Grambling	Henderson Stadium; Lorman, MS	L 6–22	12,000–15,900	
September 21	at North Carolina Central*	Durham County Memorial Stadium; Durham, NC	W 10–8	8,500–8,600	
October 6	at Texas Southern	Rice Stadium; Houston, TX	T 14–14	12,631–13,000	
October 13	Lincoln (MO)*	Henderson Stadium; Lorman, MS	W 21–0	15,500	
October 20	at Southern	University Stadium; Baton Rouge, LA	W 6–0	14,500–17,600	
October 27	Bishop*	Henderson Stadium; Lorman, MS	W 45–0	13,250	
November 3	Mississippi Valley State	Henderson Stadium; Lorman, MS	W 44–0	10,000	
November 10	Prairie View A&M	Henderson Stadium; Lorman, MS	W 44–0	8,200	
November 22	at Jackson State	Mississippi Veterans Memorial Stadium; Jackson, MS (rivalry)	L 7–21	21,000–23,000	
*Non-conference game
