= 1973 Sam Houston State Bearkats football team =

American college football season

1973 Sam Houston State Bearkats football
- Conference: Lone Star Conference
- Record: 2–8 (2–7 LSC)
- Head coach: Allen Boren (2nd season)
- Home stadium: Pritchett Field

1973 Lone Star Conference football standings
	Conf.					Overall
Team	W		L		T	W		L		T
No. 1/7 Abilene Christian $^	9	–	0	–	0	11	–	1	–	0
No. 8 Howard Payne	8	–	1	–	0	8	–	3	–	0
Stephen F. Austin	6	–	3	–	0	9	–	3	–	0
East Texas State	6	–	3	–	0	7	–	4	–	0
Angelo State	5	–	4	–	0	5	–	4	–	2
Southwest Texas State	3	–	6	–	0	4	–	6	–	0
Sul Ross	3	–	6	–	0	3	–	7	–	0
Sam Houston State	2	–	7	–	0	2	–	8	–	0
Texas A&I	2	–	7	–	0	2	–	8	–	0
Tarleton State	1	–	8	–	0	1	–	9	–	0
$ – Conference champion; ^ – NAIA Division I playoff participant; Rankings from NAIA Division I poll and AP small college poll

The 1973 Sam Houston State Bearkats football team represented Sam Houston State University as a member of the Lone Star Conference (LSC) during the 1973 NAIA Division I football season. Led by second-year head coach Allen Boren, the Bearkats compiled an overall record of 2–8 with a mark of 2–7 in conference play, and finished tied for eighth in the LSC.

== Schedule ==
Date	Opponent	Site	Result	Attendance	Source
September 8	at Texas Southern*	Houston Astrodome; Houston, TX	L 14–24	16,743	
September 22	at East Texas State	Memorial Stadium; Commerce, TX	L 6–48		
September 29	at Sul Ross	Jackson Field; Alpine, TX	L 16–26		
October 6	Angelo State	Pritchett Field; Huntsville, TX	L 0–34		
October 13	at Tarleton State	Memorial Stadium; Stephenville, TX	W 7–6		
October 20	at Southwest Texas State	Evans Field; San Marcos, TX	L 7–28		
October 27	Howard Payne	Pritchett Field; Huntsville, TX	L 13–14		
November 3	Texas A&I	Pritchett Field; Huntsville, TX	W 15–14		
November 10	at Abilene Christian	Shotwell Stadium; Abilene, TX	L 23–46		
November 17	Stephen F. Austin	Pritchett Field; Huntsville, TX (rivalry)	L 7–14		
*Non-conference game
