= 1973 Florida A&M Rattlers football team =

American college football season

1973 Florida A&M Rattlers football

Orange Blossom Classic, W 23–12 vs. South Carolina State
- Conference: Southern Intercollegiate Athletic Conference
- Division I
- Record: 5–6 (4–1 SIAC)
- Head coach: James "Big Jim" Williams (2nd season)
- Home stadium: Bragg Memorial Stadium

1973 Southern Intercollegiate Athletic Conference football standings
	Conf.					Overall
Team	W		L		T	W		L		T
Division I
Bethune–Cookman x	5	–	0	–	0	9	–	2	–	0
Florida A&M	4	–	1	–	0	5	–	6	–	0
No. 16 Albany State	3	–	2	–	0	6	–	3	–	1
Alabama A&M	3	–	2	–	0	5	–	5	–	0
Tuskegee	2	–	3	–	0	7	–	4	–	0
Morris Brown	1	–	4	–	0	1	–	8	–	1
Alabama State	0	–	5	–	0	3	–	8	–	0
Division II
No. 7 Fisk x	5	–	0	–	0	9	–	0	–	0
Fort Valley State	4	–	1	–	0	7	–	1	–	1
Clark (GA)	4	–	1	–	0	4	–	3	–	1
Morehouse	3	–	2	–	0	4	–	3	–	1
Savannah State	2	–	3	–	0	3	–	6	–	0
Lane	1	–	4	–	0	3	–	6	–	0
Miles	1	–	4	–	0	1	–	8	–	0
Knoxville	0	–	5	–	0	0	–	8	–	0
x – Division champion/co-champions; Rankings from NAIA Division II poll

The 1973 Florida A&M Rattlers football team represented Florida A&M University as a member of Division I of the Southern Intercollegiate Athletic Conference (SIAC) during the 1973 NCAA Division II football season. Led by second-year head coach James "Big Jim" Williams, the Rattlers finished the season overall record of 5–6 and a mark of 4–1 in conference play, and finished second in the SIAC's Division I.

Williams was fired in April 1974 after he did not resign at the request of the University preseident in the previous March.

== Schedule ==
Date	Opponent	Site	Result	Attendance	Source
September 15	vs. North Carolina Central*	Atlanta Stadium; Atlanta, GA	L 3–9		
September 22	at North Carolina A&T*	World War Memorial Stadium; Greensboro, NC	L 14–21	7,446	
October 6	Alabama State	Bragg Memorial Stadium; Tallahassee, FL	W 27–0	7,680	
October 13	Morris Brown^{†}	Bragg Memorial Stadium; Tallahassee, FL	W 40–14		
October 20	at No. 2 Tennessee State*	Dudley Field; Nashville, TN	L 0–45	27,000	
October 27	at Tuskegee	Cramton Bowl; Montgomery, AL	W 20–7		
November 3	at Western Carolina*	Memorial Stadium; Cullowhee, NC	L 9–41		
November 10	vs. Southern*	Tampa Stadium; Tampa, FL	L 10–14	18,228	
November 17	Bethune–Cookman	Bragg Memorial Stadium; Tallahassee, FL (Florida Classic)	L 13–21		
December 1	Albany State	Bragg Memorial Stadium; Tallahassee, FL	W 25–10		
December 8	vs. South Carolina State*	Miami Orange Bowl; Miami, FL (Orange Blossom Classic)	W 23–12	18,996	
*Non-conference game; ^{†}Homecoming; Rankings from AP Poll released prior to the game; Source:
