= 1973 Abilene Christian Wildcats football team =

American college football season

1973 Abilene Christian Wildcats football

NAIA Division I national champion LSC champion

Champion Bowl, W 42–14 vs. Elon
- Conference: Lone Star Conference
- Record: 11–1 (9–0 LSC)
- Head coach: Wally Bullington (6th season)
- MVPs: Clint Longley; Wilbert Montgomery
- Captains: Mike Layfield; Steve Ricks; Clint Longley
- Home stadium: Shotwell Stadium

1973 Lone Star Conference football standings
	Conf.					Overall
Team	W		L		T	W		L		T
No. 1/7 Abilene Christian $^	9	–	0	–	0	11	–	1	–	0
No. 8 Howard Payne	8	–	1	–	0	8	–	3	–	0
Stephen F. Austin	6	–	3	–	0	9	–	3	–	0
East Texas State	6	–	3	–	0	7	–	4	–	0
Angelo State	5	–	4	–	0	5	–	4	–	2
Southwest Texas State	3	–	6	–	0	4	–	6	–	0
Sul Ross	3	–	6	–	0	3	–	7	–	0
Sam Houston State	2	–	7	–	0	2	–	8	–	0
Texas A&I	2	–	7	–	0	2	–	8	–	0
Tarleton State	1	–	8	–	0	1	–	9	–	0
$ – Conference champion; ^ – NAIA Division I playoff participant; Rankings from NAIA Division I poll and AP small college poll

The 1973 Abilene Christian Wildcats football team was an American football team that represented Abilene Christian College (ACC) during the 1973 NAIA Division I football season. In their sixth season under head coach Wally Bullington, and their first season as a member of the Lone Star Conference (LSC), the Wildcats compiled an 11–1 record (9–0 against conference opponents), won the LSC championship, and outscored all opponents by a total of 466 to 206. They advanced to the NAIA playoff, defeating Langston (34–6) in the semifinals and Elon (42–14) in the Champion Bowl to win the 1973 NAIA Division I football national championship.

Freshman tailback Wilbert Montgomery set a new college football scoring record with 37 touchdowns and 222 points scored in 11 games, including two post-season games. Junior quarterback Clint Longley also set multiple school records, including 2,719 regular-season passing yards (3,167 including two post-season games) and 23 touchdown passes. Both received Little All-America honors.

The team played home games at Shotwell Stadium in Abilene, Texas.

== Schedule ==
Date	Opponent	Rank	Site	Result	Attendance	Source
September 8	at Arkansas State*		Kays Stadium; Jonesboro, AR	L 46–56	6,998	
September 22	Texas A&I		Shotwell Stadium; Abilene, TX	W 35–14		
September 29	at Southwest Texas State		Evans Field; San Marcos, TX	W 41–7		
October 6	Stephen F. Austin		Shotwell Stadium; Abilene, TX	W 57–50		
October 13	at East Texas State		Memorial Stadium; Commerce, TX	W 18–15		
October 20	Sul Ross		Shotwell Stadium; Abilene, TX	W 29–0		
October 27	at Angelo State		San Angelo, TX	W 27–0		
November 3	at Tarleton State		Memorial Stadium; Stephenville, TX	W 49–7		
November 10	Sam Houston State		Shotwell Stadium; Abilene, TX	W 46–23		
November 17	Howard Payne	No. 13	Shotwell Stadium; Abilene, TX	W 42–14		
December 1	No. 14 Langston*	No. 8	Shotwell Stadium; Abilene, TX (NAIA Division I semifinal)	W 34–6	6,620	
December 8	vs. No. 6 Elon*	No. 8	State Fair Stadium; Shreveport, LA (NAIA Division championship game—Champion Bowl)	W 42–14	4,162	
*Non-conference game; Rankings from AP Poll released prior to the game

== Regular season ==
=== Arkansas State ===
ACC opened its season on September 8 with a 56–46 loss to Arkansas State in Jonesboro, Arkansas. The quarterbacks posted huge numbers: Arkansas State quarterback Steve Burks rushed for 179 yards and scored seven touchdowns, while ACC quarterback Clint Longley passed for 433 yards and six touchdowns, including a 92-yard touchdown pass to Richard Williams. Longley's 433 yards broke Abilene's single-game school record, and the 92-yard strike to Williams was the longest in school history.

=== Texas A&I ===
On September 22, ACC defeated Texas A&I, 35–14. Quarterback Clint Longley threw three touchdown passes to Richard Williams, and Wilbert Montgomery had two rushing touchdowns in his second college game. Fullback Hubert Picket also rushed for 139 yards and a touchdown.

=== Southwest Texas State ===
On September 29, quarterback Clint Longley broke his own school record with 444 passing yards in a 41–7 victory over Southwest Texas State. Longley connected with Richard Williams for a pair of 57-yard touchdown passes to Richard Williams.

=== Stephen F. Austin ===
On October 6, the Wildcats played their highest scoring game of the season, defeating Stephen F. Austin, 57–50. Abilene trailed, 28–20, at halftime, but scored 37 points in the second half. In just his fourth college game, Wilbert Harrison totaled 146 rushing yards, 74 receiving yards, and a school-record six touchdowns. Quarterback Clint Longley completed 28 of 38 passes for 375 yards and two touchdowns.

=== East Texas State ===
On October 13, ACC faced its toughest test of the regular season, a road game against the defending 1972 NAIA national champion, East Texas State. The Wildcats prevailed in a close game by an 18–15 score. ACC touchdowns were scored by Richard Williams (three-yard run), David Henson on a 20-yard pass from Clint Longley, and Wilbert Montgomery on a three-yard run in the third quarter.

=== Sul Ross ===
On October 20, ACC shut out Sul Ross, 29–0. Clint Longley passed for 224 yards, scored two rushing touchdowns and also threw a touchdown pass to David Henson. Richard Williams also scored on a 57-yard run.

=== Angelo State ===
On October 27, ACC shut out its second consecutive opponent, defeating Angelo State, 27–0. Wilbert Montgomery rushed for 165 yards and three touchdowns. Clint Longley passed for 205 yards, including a 20-yard touchdown pass to Richard Williams.

=== Tarleton State ===
On November 3, the Wildcats defeated Tarleton State, 49–7. Wilbert Montgomery rushed for 168 yards and scored four touchdowns. Montgomery's four touchdowns broke the Lone Star Conference season scoring record. Clint Longley also passed for 302 yards and two touchdowns.

=== Sam Houston ===
On November 10, ACC defeated Sam Houston State, 46–23. Wilbert Robinson rushed for 109 yards and scored five touchdowns (four rushing and one receiving). Robinson's 164 points to that point were four short of the all-time NAIA season scoring record.

=== Howard Payne ===
On November 17, ACC faced Howard Payne, ranked No. 4 in the NAIA, in a battle of undefeated teams, with the winner taking the Lone Star Conference championship. Abilene won by a 42–14 score. Wilbert Montgomery scored four touchdowns (three on the ground and the other on a 51-yard pass from Clint Longley.

== Post-season ==
=== NAIA semifinal ===
ACC was invited to participate in the NAIA playoffs and met Oklahoma's Langston Lions in a semifinal game played before a crowd of 6,620 at Abilene's Shotwell Stadium on December 1. Abilene dominated the game and won by a 34–6 score. Wilbert Montgomery ran 71 yards for a touchdown the first time he carried the ball. He finished the game with 168 rushing yards and four touchdowns against the Langston defense that was rated as the best in the NAIA.

=== NAIA National Championship game ===
The 1973 Champion Bowl was played to determine the NAIA Football National Championship. It was played on December 8 before 4,162 spectators at State Fair Stadium in Shreveport, Louisiana, and matched No. 1 Elon against No. 3 ACC. The two teams combined for a Champion Bowl record 951 yards of total offense (605 for Abilene Christian and 346 yards for Elon).

Wilbert Montgomery was selected as the game's most valuable player, rushing for 149 yards, catching four passes for 79 yards, and scoring two touchdowns. His two touchdowns in the Champion Bowl brought his season total to 37 in 11 games.

Abilene quarterback Clint Longley passed for 341 yards and four touchdowns. Wide receiver Richard Williams caught five passes for 119 yards, including a 68-yard touchdown strike in the second quarter.

On the Monday after the game, the team attended a rally to celebrate the national championship with students and administrators at ACC's Moody Coliseum. The 75-pound national championship trophy was unveiled at the rally.

== Records and awards ==
Two ACC players were recognized on the 1973 Little All-America college football team. Despite his not becoming a starter until the fourth game, and missing the fifth game due to injury, freshman running back Wilbert Montgomery won first-team honors, and junior quarterback Clint Longley won second-team honors.

Longley and Montgomery both set multiple school records. Longley's records included 506 total yards and six touchdown passes against Arkansas State; 434 passing yards against Southwest Texas State; a 92-yard touchdown pass to Richard Williams against Arkansas State; and 2,719 passing yards and 23 touchdown passes in the regular season. Montgomery's records included six touchdowns against Stephen F. Austin and 31 regular-season touchdowns and 188 points (37 touchdowns and 222 points including post-season games). His totals broke the prior college football scoring record, including both the NAIA and the NCAA. The prior NCAA record, shared by Lydell Mitchell and Terry Metcalf, was 29 touchdowns in a season.

Five ACC players received first-team honors on the 1973 All-Lone Star Conference football team. In addition to Montgomery and Longley, the first-team honors went to sophomore wide receiver Greg Stirman, senior wide receiver Richard Williams, and senior defensive back Jan Brown. Three others received second-team honors: defensive down lineman Chip Martin; linebacker Charles Hinson; and defensive back Reggie Hunter.

Coach Bullington was named Lone Star Conference Coach of the Year award and finished third in the national voting for NAIA Coach of the Year award.
