= 1973 Prairie View A&M Panthers football team =

American college football season

1973 Prairie View A&M Panthers football
- Conference: Southwestern Athletic Conference
- Record: 2–6–1 (0–6 SWAC)
- Head coach: Hoover J. Wright (4th season)
- Home stadium: Edward L. Blackshear Field

1973 Southwestern Athletic Conference football standings
	Conf.					Overall
Team	W		L		T	W		L		T
No. 5/7 Grambling +^	5	–	1	–	0	10	–	3	–	0
No. 10 Jackson State +	5	–	1	–	0	9	–	2	–	0
No. T–20 Alcorn A&M	3	–	2	–	1	7	–	2	–	1
Southern	3	–	3	–	0	6	–	4	–	0
Texas Southern	2	–	3	–	1	5	–	5	–	1
Mississippi Valley State	2	–	4	–	0	3	–	5	–	0
Prairie View A&M	0	–	6	–	0	2	–	6	–	1
+ – Conference co-champions; ^ – NCAA Division II playoff participant; Rankings from NAIA Division I poll and AP small college poll

The 1973 Prairie View A&M Panthers football team represented Prairie View A&M University as a member of the Southwestern Athletic Conference (SWAC) during the 1973 NCAA Division II football season. Led by fourth-year head coach Hoover J. Wright, the Panthers compiled an overall record of 2–6–1, with a conference record of 0–6, and finished seventh in the SWAC.

== Schedule ==
Date	Opponent	Site	Result	Attendance	Source
September 15	Jackson State	Blackshear Field; Prairie View, TX	L 7–32		
September 22	at Southern	BREC Memorial Stadium; Baton Rouge, LA	L 0–9	14,500	
September 29	at No. 2 Grambling	Grambling Stadium; Grambling, LA	L 12–37	14,968	
October 6	Texas Lutheran*	Edward L. Blackshear Field; Prairie View, TX	W 17–6		
October 13	at Arkansas–Pine Bluff*	Pumphrey Stadium; Pine Bluff, AR	T 7–7		
October 20	at Bishop*	P.C. Cobb Stadium; Dallas, TX	W 25–3		
October 27	at Mississippi Valley State	Magnolia Stadium; Itta Bena, MS	L 6–13		
November 10	at Alcorn A&M	Henderson Stadium; Lorman, MS	L 0–44	8,200	
November 17	at Texas Southern	Astrodome; Houston, TX (rivalry)	L 14–41	23,563	
*Non-conference game; Rankings from AP Poll released prior to the game
