= 1973 Mississippi Valley State Delta Devils football team =

American college football season

1973 Mississippi Valley State Delta Devils football
- Conference: Southwestern Athletic Conference
- Record: 3–5 (2–4 SWAC)
- Head coach: Davis Weathersby (4th season)
- Home stadium: Magnolia Stadium; Charles Kerg Field

1973 Southwestern Athletic Conference football standings
	Conf.					Overall
Team	W		L		T	W		L		T
No. 5/7 Grambling +^	5	–	1	–	0	10	–	3	–	0
No. 10 Jackson State +	5	–	1	–	0	9	–	2	–	0
No. T–20 Alcorn A&M	3	–	2	–	1	7	–	2	–	1
Southern	3	–	3	–	0	6	–	4	–	0
Texas Southern	2	–	3	–	1	5	–	5	–	1
Mississippi Valley State	2	–	4	–	0	3	–	5	–	0
Prairie View A&M	0	–	6	–	0	2	–	6	–	1
+ – Conference co-champions; ^ – NCAA Division II playoff participant; Rankings from NAIA Division I poll and AP small college poll

The 1973 Mississippi Valley State Delta Devils football team represented Mississippi Valley State College (now known as Mississippi Valley State University) as a member of the Southwestern Athletic Conference (SWAC) during the 1973 NCAA Division II football season. Led by fourth-year head coach Davis Weathersby, the Delta Devils compiled an overall record of 3–5, with a conference record of 2–4, and finished sixth in the SWAC.

== Schedule ==
Date	Opponent	Site	Result	Attendance	Source
September 8	at Alabama A&M*	Milton Frank Stadium; Huntsville, AL	L 13–41		
September 15	Arkansas–Pine Bluff*	Magnolia Stadium; Itta Bena, MS	W 19–0		
September 22	No. 15 Jackson State	Magnolia Stadium; Itta Bena, MS	L 22–26	12,000	
September 29	at Southern	University Stadium; Baton Rouge, LA	L 14–19	14,500	
October 13	at Grambling	Grambling Stadium; Grambling, LA	L 0–17	16,721	
October 20	Texas Southern	Magnolia Stadium; Itta Bena, MS	W 15–6	4,000	
October 27	Prairie View A&M	Magnolia Stadium; Itta Bena, MS	W 13–6		
November 3	at Alcorn A&M	Henderson Stadium; Lorman, MS	L 0–44		
*Non-conference game; Rankings from AP Poll released prior to the game
