= 1973 Southern Jaguars football team =

American college football season

1973 Southern Jaguars football
- Conference: Southwestern Athletic Conference
- Record: 6–4 (3–3 SWAC)
- Head coach: Charles Bates (2nd season)
- Home stadium: University Stadium; BREC Memorial Stadium

1973 Southwestern Athletic Conference football standings
	Conf.					Overall
Team	W		L		T	W		L		T
No. 5/7 Grambling +^	5	–	1	–	0	10	–	3	–	0
No. 10 Jackson State +	5	–	1	–	0	9	–	2	–	0
No. T–20 Alcorn A&M	3	–	2	–	1	7	–	2	–	1
Southern	3	–	3	–	0	6	–	4	–	0
Texas Southern	2	–	3	–	1	5	–	5	–	1
Mississippi Valley State	2	–	4	–	0	3	–	5	–	0
Prairie View A&M	0	–	6	–	0	2	–	6	–	1
+ – Conference co-champions; ^ – NCAA Division II playoff participant; Rankings from NAIA Division I poll and AP small college poll

The 1973 Southern Jaguars football team represented Southern University as a member of the Southwestern Athletic Conference (SWAC) during the 1973 NCAA Division II football season. Led by second-year head coach Charles Bates, the Jaguars compiled an overall record of 6–4, with a conference record of 3–3, and finished fourth in the SWAC.

== Schedule ==
Date	Opponent	Site	Result	Attendance	Source
September 8	Tuskegee*	University Stadium; Baton Rouge, LA	W 21–13	14,500	
September 15	Texas Southern	University Stadium; Baton Rouge, LA	W 23–15	14,500	
September 22	Prairie View A&M	BREC Memorial Stadium; Baton Rouge, LA	W 9–0	14,500	
September 29	Mississippi Valley State	University Stadium; Baton Rouge, LA	W 19–14	14,500	
October 6	Arkansas–Pine Bluff*	University Stadium; Baton Rouge, LA	W 34–13	14,500	
October 13	at Jackson State	Mississippi Veterans Memorial Stadium; Jackson, MS (rivalry)	L 3–28	27,000	
October 20	Alcorn A&M	University Stadium; Baton Rouge, LA	L 0–6	14,500–17,600	
October 27	No. 1 Tennessee State*	University Stadium; Baton Rouge, LA	L 6–21	14,500	
November 10	vs. Florida A&M*	Tampa Stadium; Tampa, FL	W 14–10	18,228	
November 17	vs. No. 5 Grambling	State Fair Stadium; Shreveport, LA (rivalry)	L 14–19	38,000	
*Non-conference game; Rankings from AP Poll released prior to the game
