= Wharton High School =

Wharton High School may refer to:

- Paul R. Wharton High School in Tampa, Florida
- Wharton High School in Wharton, Texas
