= 1973 Jackson State Tigers football team =

American college football season

1973 Jackson State Tigers football

SWAC co-champion
- Conference: Southwestern Athletic Conference
- Record: 9–2 (5–1 SWAC)
- Head coach: Robert Hill (3rd season)
- Home stadium: Mississippi Veterans Memorial Stadium

1973 Southwestern Athletic Conference football standings
	Conf.					Overall
Team	W		L		T	W		L		T
No. 5/7 Grambling +^	5	–	1	–	0	10	–	3	–	0
No. 10 Jackson State +	5	–	1	–	0	9	–	2	–	0
No. T–20 Alcorn A&M	3	–	2	–	1	7	–	2	–	1
Southern	3	–	3	–	0	6	–	4	–	0
Texas Southern	2	–	3	–	1	5	–	5	–	1
Mississippi Valley State	2	–	4	–	0	3	–	5	–	0
Prairie View A&M	0	–	6	–	0	2	–	6	–	1
+ – Conference co-champions; ^ – NCAA Division II playoff participant; Rankings from NAIA Division I poll and AP small college poll

The 1973 Jackson State Tigers football team represented Jackson State University as a member of the Southwestern Athletic Conference (SWAC) during the 1973 NCAA Division II football season. Led by third-year head coach Robert Hill, the Tigers compiled an overall record of 9–2, with a conference record of 5–1, and finished as SWAC co-champion.

== Schedule ==
Date	Opponent	Rank	Site	Result	Attendance	Source
September 8	at Nebraska–Omaha*		Al F. Caniglia Field; Omaha, NE	W 17–0		
September 15	at Prairie View A&M		Blackshear Field; Prairie View, TX	W 32–7		
September 22	at Mississippi Valley State	No. 15	Magnolia Stadium; Itta Bena, MS	W 26–22	12,000	
September 29	at Kentucky State*		Alumni Field; Frankfort, KY	L 7–9	2,500	
October 6	Bishop*		Mississippi Veterans Memorial Stadium; Jackson, MS	W 60–12		
October 13	Southern		Mississippi Veterans Memorial Stadium; Jackson, MS (rivalry)	W 28–3		
October 20	No. 5 Grambling		Mississippi Veterans Memorial Stadium; Jackson, MS	L 12–19	26,745	
October 27	Bethune–Cookman*		Mississippi Veterans Memorial Stadium; Jackson, MS	W 42–32	12,000	
November 3	at Texas Southern		Jeppesen Stadium; Houston, TX	W 44–14	11,000	
November 10	Morris Brown*		Mississippi Veterans Memorial Stadium; Jackson, MS	W 47–7		
November 22	Alcorn A&M		Mississippi Veterans Memorial Stadium; Jackson, MS (rivalry)	W 21–7	21,000–23,000	
*Non-conference game; Rankings from AP Poll released prior to the game
