= 1973 Grambling Tigers football team =

American college football season

1973 Grambling Tigers football

SWAC co-champion

Grantland Rice Bowl, L 20–28 vs. Western Kentucky
- Conference: Southwestern Athletic Conference

Ranking
- AP: No. 7
- Record: 10–3 (5–1 SWAC)
- Head coach: Eddie Robinson (31st season)
- Home stadium: Grambling Stadium

1973 Southwestern Athletic Conference football standings
	Conf.					Overall
Team	W		L		T	W		L		T
No. 5/7 Grambling +^	5	–	1	–	0	10	–	3	–	0
No. 10 Jackson State +	5	–	1	–	0	9	–	2	–	0
No. T–20 Alcorn A&M	3	–	2	–	1	7	–	2	–	1
Southern	3	–	3	–	0	6	–	4	–	0
Texas Southern	2	–	3	–	1	5	–	5	–	1
Mississippi Valley State	2	–	4	–	0	3	–	5	–	0
Prairie View A&M	0	–	6	–	0	2	–	6	–	1
+ – Conference co-champions; ^ – NCAA Division II playoff participant; Rankings from NAIA Division I poll and AP small college poll

The 1973 Grambling Tigers football team was an American football team that represented Grambling College (now known as Grambling State University) as a member of the Southwestern Athletic Conference (SWAC) during the 1973 NCAA Division II football season. In its 31st season under head coach Eddie Robinson, Grambling compiled a 10–3 record (5–1 against conference opponents), tied for the SWAC championship, and outscored opponents by a total of 339 to 176. In two post-season games, the Tigers defeated Delaware in the Boardwalk Bowl and lost to Western Kentucky in the Grantland Rice Bowl.

== Schedule ==
Date	Opponent	Rank	Site	Result	Attendance	Source
September 8	vs. Long Beach State*		Los Angeles Memorial Coliseum; Los Angeles, CA (Freedom Classic)	W 29–16	30,884	
September 15	at Alcorn A&M		Henderson Stadium; Lorman, MS	W 22–6	12,000–15,900	
September 22	vs. Morgan State*	No. 2	Yankee Stadium; Bronx, NY (Whitney M. Young Memorial Classic)	W 31–14	64,243	
September 29	Prairie View A&M	No. 2	Grambling Stadium; Grambling, LA	W 37–12	14,968	
October 6	at No. 7 Tennessee State*	No. 2	Hale Stadium; Nashville, TN	L 13–19	16,000–16,500	
October 13	Mississippi Valley State	No. 6	Grambling Stadium; Grambling, LA	W 17–0	16,721	
October 20	at Jackson State	No. 5	Mississippi Veterans Memorial Stadium; Jackson, MS	W 19–12	26,745	
October 27	at Texas Southern	No. 9	Houston Astrodome; Houston, TX	L 21–35	53,859	
November 3	North Carolina A&T*	No. 13	Grambling Stadium; Grambling, LA	W 62–6	3,731–6,000	
November 10	at Norfolk State*	No. 8	Foreman Field; Norfolk, VA	W 32–6	6,000	
November 17	vs. Southern	No. 5	State Fair Stadium; Shreveport, LA (rivalry)	W 19–14	38,000	
December 1	vs. No. 12 Delaware*	No. 5	Atlantic City Convention Center; Atlantic City, NJ (Boardwalk Bowl—NCAA Division II Quarterfinal)	W 17–8	12,043	
December 8	vs. No. 2 Western Kentucky*	No. 5	BREC Memorial Stadium; Baton Rouge, LA (Grantland Rice Bowl—NCAA Division II Semifinal)	L 20–28	15,000	
*Non-conference game; Rankings from AP Poll released prior to the game
