= Harold Gray (American football) =

American football player and coach (1938–1990)

Biographical details
- Born: October 24, 1938; Norfolk, Virginia, U.S.
- Died: April 30, 1990 (aged 51)

Playing career

Football
- 1957–1960: Maryland State
- 1965–1968: Norfolk Neptunes

Baseball
- c. 1960: Maryland State
- Position: Offensive guard (football)

Coaching career (HC unless noted)

Football
- 1973–1977: Maryland Eastern Shore
- 1981–1989: Hampton (OL/DL)

Baseball
- 1973: Maryland Eastern Shore

Head coaching record
- Overall: 11–38 (football); 12–6 (baseball)

Harold Curtis "House" Gray (October 24, 1938 – April 30, 1990) was an American football player and coach of football and baseball. He served as the head football coach at the University of Maryland Eastern Shore from 1973 to 1977, compiling a record of 11–38. Gray was also the head baseball coach at Maryland Eastern Shore in 1973, tallying a mark of Gray 12–6. He played football and baseball at Maryland Eastern Shore when it was known as Maryland State College.

== Head coaching record ==
=== Football ===
| Year | Team | Overall | Conference | Standing | Bowl/playoffs |
|---|---|---|---|---|---|
Maryland Eastern Shore Hawks (Mid-Eastern Athletic Conference) (1973–1977)
| 1973 | Maryland Eastern Shore | 4–5 | 2–4 | 5th | |
| 1974 | Maryland Eastern Shore | 2–6 | 1–5 | 6th | |
| 1975 | Maryland Eastern Shore | 0–10 | 0–6 | 7th | |
| 1976 | Maryland Eastern Shore | 2–9 | 1–5 | T–6th | |
| 1977 | Maryland Eastern Shore | 3–8 | 1–5 | 6th | |
| Maryland Eastern Shore: | | 11–38 | 5–25 | | |
| Total: | | 11–38 | | | |
