= Thomas Morris (American football) =

American football and basketball coach (1938–2010)

Biographical details
- Born: December 15, 1938; Newport News, Virginia, U.S.
- Died: November 6, 2010 (aged 71)

Playing career

Football
- c. 1965: Saint Paul's (VA)

Basketball
- c. 1965: Saint Paul's (VA)

Coaching career (HC unless noted)

Football
- 1966–1970: Saint Paul's (VA)
- 1971–1972: Morgan State (assistant)
- 1973–1976: Morgan State (DC)
- 1977–1979: Virginia State
- 1980: Fayetteville State
- 1981: Morgan State

Basketball
- 1966–1971: Saint Paul's (VA)

Administrative career (AD unless noted)
- 2002–2005: Livingstone (associate AD)

Head coaching record
- Overall: 33–54–5 (football); 44–66 (basketball)

Thomas Roosevelt Morris (December 15, 1938 – November 6, 2010) was an American college football and college basketball coach. He served as the head football coach at Saint Paul's College in Lawrenceville, Virginia from 1966 to 1970, Virginia State University from 1977 to 1979, Fayetteville State University in 1980, and Morgan State University in 1981, compiling a career college football head coaching record of 33–54–5. Morris was also the head basketball coach at Saint Paul's from 1966 to 1971, tallying a mark of 44–66.

A native of Newport News, Virginia, Morris attended Collis P. Huntington High School there, graduating in 1957. He played football and basketball at Saint Paul's before graduating in 1966. Morris earned a master's degree in education from the College of William & Mary in 1971. He left Saint Paul's the same year and moved to Morgan State as an assistant football coach. He was promoted to defensive coordinator at Morgan State in 1973. Morris was also an assistant football coach at Virginia Union University and Norfolk State University.

== Head coaching record ==
=== Football ===
Year	Team	Overall	Conference	Standing	Bowl/playoffs
Saint Paul's Tigers (Central Intercollegiate Athletic Association) (1966–1971)
1966	Saint Paul's	1–7–1	1–6–1	16th	
1967	Saint Paul's	2–5–1	1–5–1	16th	
1968	Saint Paul's	1–7	0–7	17th	
1969	Saint Paul's	1–7	0–6	16th	
1970	Saint Paul's	3–5	1–1	5th (Northern)	
Saint Paul's:		8–31–2	3–25–2		
Virginia State Trojans (Central Intercollegiate Athletic Association) (1977–1979)
1977	Virginia State	7–3–1	6–1–1	3rd	
1978	Virginia State	5–6	5–3	5th	
1979	Virginia State	6–4–1	5–2–1	4th	
Virginia State:		18–13–2	16–6–2		
Fayetteville State Broncos (Central Intercollegiate Athletic Association) (1980)
1980	Fayetteville State	3–5–1	2–5	9th	
Fayetteville State:		3–5–1	2–5		
Morgan State Bears (NCAA Division II independent) (1981)
1981	Morgan State	4–5			
Morgan State:		4–5			
Total:		33–54–5			
