= 1973 Texas Southern Tigers football team =

American college football season

1973 Texas Southern Tigers football
- Conference: Southwestern Athletic Conference
- Record: 5–5–1 (2–3–1 SWAC)
- Head coach: Rod Paige (3rd season)
- Home stadium: Astrodome; Jeppesen Stadium; Rice Stadium

1973 Southwestern Athletic Conference football standings
	Conf.					Overall
Team	W		L		T	W		L		T
No. 5/7 Grambling +^	5	–	1	–	0	10	–	3	–	0
No. 10 Jackson State +	5	–	1	–	0	9	–	2	–	0
No. T–20 Alcorn A&M	3	–	2	–	1	7	–	2	–	1
Southern	3	–	3	–	0	6	–	4	–	0
Texas Southern	2	–	3	–	1	5	–	5	–	1
Mississippi Valley State	2	–	4	–	0	3	–	5	–	0
Prairie View A&M	0	–	6	–	0	2	–	6	–	1
+ – Conference co-champions; ^ – NCAA Division II playoff participant; Rankings from NAIA Division I poll and AP small college poll

The 1973 Texas Southern Tigers football team was an American football team that represented Texas Southern University as a member of the Southwestern Athletic Conference (SWAC) during the 1973 NCAA Division II football season. Led by third-year head coach Rod Paige, the Tigers compiled an overall record of 5–5–1, with a mark of 2–3–1 in conference play, and finished fifth in the SWAC.

== Schedule ==
Date	Opponent	Site	Result	Attendance	Source
September 8	Sam Houston State*	Astrodome; Houston, TX	W 24–14	16,743	
September 15	at Southern	University Stadium; Baton Rouge, LA	L 15–23		
September 22	No. 3 Tennessee State*	Jeppesen Stadium; Houston, TX	L 20–23	15,500	
September 29	at No. 6 Hawaii*	Honolulu Stadium; Honolulu, HI	L 21–24	23,500	
October 6	Alcorn A&M	Rice Stadium; Houston, TX	T 14–14	12,631–13,000	
October 13	at Bishop*	Dallas, TX	W 41–7		
October 20	at Mississippi Valley State	Magnolia Stadium; Itta Bena, MS	L 6–15	4,000	
October 27	No. 9 Grambling	Astrodome; Houston, TX	W 35–21	53,859	
November 3	Jackson State	Jeppesen Stadium; Houston, TX	L 14–44	11,000	
November 10	Langston*	Jeppesen Stadium; Houston, TX	L 7–14	11,000	
November 17	Prairie View A&M	Astrodome; Houston, TX (rivalry)	W 41–14	23,563	
*Non-conference game; Rankings from AP Poll released prior to the game
