= Durham County Memorial Stadium =

Sports stadium in North Carolina, U.S.

Coordinates: 36.035427°N 78.903165°W

- Interactive map of Durham County Memorial Stadium
- Full name: Durham County Memorial Stadium
- Address: 750 Stadium Drive
- Location: Durham County, North Carolina
- Owner: County of Durham
- Capacity: 8,500
- Surface: Artificial Turf (Astroturf); 8 Lane Polyurethane Track (Beynon Sports Surfaces BS2000RE Encapsulated)

Construction
- Built: 1958
- Renovated: 2010

Tenants
- Northern Durham High School (NCHSAA); Carolina Flyers (UFA); Tobacco Road FC (USL2); Shaw Bears (NCAA D2)

Website
- www.dconc.gov/county-departments/departments-a-e/county-stadium

Durham County Memorial Stadium is an 8,500-seat multi-purpose stadium located in Durham, North Carolina. Originally built in 1958, the stadium underwent significant renovations in 2010 that updated the facility to include an artificial turf lined for soccer, football and lacrosse and a track and field facility with an eight lane track. Durham County Memorial Stadium is the home field of Northern Durham High School Football, Carolina Flyers of the AUDL and Tobacco Road FC of USL-2. The stadium is also used as a special events facility hosting local, regional and national events.

The stadium hosted Shaw University Football from 2007 to 2018, and again after the 2022 season. Shaw also hosts a majority of their men's and women's soccer matches at the stadium despite the school's location in neighboring Wake County.

Durham County Memorial Stadium is managed by the Durham County Memorial Stadium Authority and owned by the County of Durham.

== Notable events ==
- NAIA Football National Championship 2021–2024
- USATF Youth National Championship 2019
- CIAA Football Conference Championship 2008–2012 and 2014–2015
- CIAA Outdoor Track and Field Championships 2023
- North Carolina High School Athletic Association Lacrosse State Championships 2023
- State Games of North Carolina Track and Field and Lacrosse
