= 1970 Ball State Cardinals football team =

American college football season

1970 Ball State Cardinals football
- Conference: Independent
- Record: 5–5
- Head coach: Wave Myers (3rd season)
- Offensive coordinator: Gary Tranquill (1st season)
- Home stadium: Ball State Stadium

1970 NCAA College Division independents football records
	Conf.			Overall
Team	W	L	T	W		L		T
No. 4 Tampa		–		10	–	1	–	0
No. 5 Tennessee State		–		10	–	0	–	0
No. 11 Delaware		–		9	–	2	–	0
Hawaii		–		9	–	2	–	0
Northern Michigan		–		8	–	2	–	0
No. 19 Eastern Michigan		–		7	–	2	–	1
Mankato State		–		7	–	2	–	1
Akron		–		7	–	3	–	0
Central Michigan		–		7	–	3	–	0
Temple		–		7	–	3	–	0
Drake		–		7	–	4	–	0
Wayne State (MI)		–		6	–	2	–	0
Arkansas AM&N		–		6	–	3	–	0
Southern Illinois		–		6	–	3	–	0
St. Norbert		–		6	–	3	–	0
Nevada		–		6	–	3	–	1
Portland State		–		6	–	4	–	0
UNLV		–		6	–	4	–	0
Boston University		–		5	–	4	–	0
Cortland		–		5	–	4	–	0
Indiana (PA)		–		5	–	4	–	0
Santa Clara		–		5	–	4	–	1
Lafayette		–		6	–	5	–	0
Colorado College		–		4	–	4	–	0
Drexel		–		4	–	4	–	0
Hofstra		–		5	–	5	–	0
Indiana State		–		5	–	5	–	0
Samford		–		5	–	5	–	0
Wabash		–		3	–	3	–	2
Saint Mary's		–		3	–	4	–	0
Ashland		–		4	–	6	–	0
Bucknell		–		4	–	6	–	0
Lehigh		–		4	–	6	–	0
Rose Poly		–		3	–	5	–	1
Illinois College		–		3	–	5	–	0
Northeastern		–		3	–	5	–	0
Indiana Central		–		3	–	6	–	0
Lake Forest		–		3	–	6	–	0
Kentucky State		–		3	–	6	–	0
Chicago		–		2	–	5	–	0
Chattanooga		–		3	–	8	–	0
Parsons		–		2	–	7	–	0
Eastern Illinois		–		2	–	8	–	0
Milwaukee		–		1	–	9	–	0
Rankings from AP small college poll

The 1970 Ball State Cardinals football team was an American football team that represented Ball State University as an independent during the 1970 NCAA College Division football season. In its third and final season under head coach Wave Myers, the team compiled a 5–5 record. The team played its home games at Ball State Stadium in Muncie, Indiana.

== Schedule ==
Date	Time	Opponent	Site	Result	Attendance	Source
September 12	1:30 p.m.	at Buffalo	Rotary Field; Buffalo, NY	W 14–7	9,845	
September 19		Eastern Kentucky	Ball State Stadium; Muncie, IN	L 12–13	15,600	
September 26		at Butler	Indianapolis, IN	W 26–13	3,600	
October 3		No. 2 Akron	Ball State Stadium; Muncie, IN	L 0–31	8,305	
October 10		at Indiana State	Memorial Stadium; Terre Haute, IN (Blue Key Victory Bell)	W 28–26	16,717–18,500	
October 17		Evansville^{†}	Ball State Stadium; Muncie, IN	W 21–14	16,225	
October 24	1:30 p.m.	Northern Illinois	Ball State Stadium; Muncie, IN (rivalry)	L 14–31	4,770	
October 31		at Middle Tennessee	Horace Jones Field; Murfreesboro, TN	L 7–14	4,800–5,000	
November 7		No. 10 Southern Illinois	Ball State Stadium; Muncie, IN	W 24–17	10,950	
November 14		at Eastern Michigan	Rynearson Stadium; Ypsilanti, MI	L 0–60	1,500–2,300	
^{†}Homecoming; Rankings from small college AP Poll released prior to the game; All times are in Eastern time
