= 1970 Drake Bulldogs football team =

American college football season

1970 Drake Bulldogs football
- Conference: Independent
- Record: 7–4
- Head coach: Jack Wallace (6th season)
- Home stadium: Drake Stadium

1970 NCAA College Division independents football records
	Conf.			Overall
Team	W	L	T	W		L		T
No. 4 Tampa		–		10	–	1	–	0
No. 5 Tennessee State		–		10	–	0	–	0
No. 11 Delaware		–		9	–	2	–	0
Hawaii		–		9	–	2	–	0
Northern Michigan		–		8	–	2	–	0
No. 19 Eastern Michigan		–		7	–	2	–	1
Mankato State		–		7	–	2	–	1
Akron		–		7	–	3	–	0
Central Michigan		–		7	–	3	–	0
Temple		–		7	–	3	–	0
Drake		–		7	–	4	–	0
Wayne State (MI)		–		6	–	2	–	0
Arkansas AM&N		–		6	–	3	–	0
Southern Illinois		–		6	–	3	–	0
St. Norbert		–		6	–	3	–	0
Nevada		–		6	–	3	–	1
Portland State		–		6	–	4	–	0
UNLV		–		6	–	4	–	0
Boston University		–		5	–	4	–	0
Cortland		–		5	–	4	–	0
Indiana (PA)		–		5	–	4	–	0
Santa Clara		–		5	–	4	–	1
Lafayette		–		6	–	5	–	0
Colorado College		–		4	–	4	–	0
Drexel		–		4	–	4	–	0
Hofstra		–		5	–	5	–	0
Indiana State		–		5	–	5	–	0
Samford		–		5	–	5	–	0
Wabash		–		3	–	3	–	2
Saint Mary's		–		3	–	4	–	0
Ashland		–		4	–	6	–	0
Bucknell		–		4	–	6	–	0
Lehigh		–		4	–	6	–	0
Rose Poly		–		3	–	5	–	1
Illinois College		–		3	–	5	–	0
Northeastern		–		3	–	5	–	0
Indiana Central		–		3	–	6	–	0
Lake Forest		–		3	–	6	–	0
Kentucky State		–		3	–	6	–	0
Chicago		–		2	–	5	–	0
Chattanooga		–		3	–	8	–	0
Parsons		–		2	–	7	–	0
Eastern Illinois		–		2	–	8	–	0
Milwaukee		–		1	–	9	–	0
Rankings from AP small college poll

The 1970 Drake Bulldogs football team was an American football team that represented Drake University as an independent during the 1970 NCAA College Division football season. In its sixth season under head coach Jack Wallace, the team compiled a 7–4 record and outscored opponents by a total of 293 to 235.

The team's statistical leaders included junior quarterback Mike Grejbowski (1,437 passing yards), freshman tailback Jerry Heston (1,104 rushing yards, 102 points scored), and sophomore split end Doug Winslow (44 receptions for 649 yards).

The team played its home games at Drake Stadium in Des Moines, Iowa.

== Schedule ==
Date	Opponent	Site	Result	Attendance	Source
September 12	Idaho State	Drake Stadium; Des Moines, IA	W 39–10	11,000	
September 19	at Weber State	Wildcat Stadium; Ogden, UT	W 36–19	14,036	
September 26	Nebraska-Omaha	Drake Stadium; Des Moines, IA	W 51–22	13,250	
October 3	at North Texas State	Fouts Field; Denton, TX	L 13–37	8,500	
October 10	at Northern Iowa	O. R. Latham Stadium; Cedar Falls, IA	L 10–13	5,784-7,200	
October 17	at Northern Arizona	Lumberjack Stadium; Flagstaff, AZ	W 31–17	8,100	
October 24	at Western Illinois	Hanson Field; Macomb, IL	W 28–24	16,200	
October 31	Abilene Christian	Drake Stadium; Des Moines, IA	L 13–33	13,500	
November 7	South Dakota	Drake Stadium; Des Moines, IA	W 37–28	10,700	
November 14	Southern Illinois	Drake Stadium; Des Moines, IA	W 21–9	4,500	
November 21	at Louisville	Fairgrounds Stadium; Louisville, KY	L 14–23	12,267	
