= 1972 Ball State Cardinals football team =

American college football season

1972 Ball State Cardinals football
- Conference: Independent
- Record: 5–4–1
- Head coach: Dave McClain (2nd season)
- Home stadium: Ball State Stadium

1972 NCAA College Division independents football records
	Conf.			Overall
Team	W	L	T	W		L		T
No. 4 Ashland		–		11	–	0	–	0
Bridgeport		–		11	–	0	–	0
No. 1 Delaware		–		10	–	0	–	0
No. 5 Tennessee State		–		11	–	1	–	0
Colorado College		–		8	–	1	–	0
Tampa		–		10	–	2	–	0
Trinity (TX)		–		8	–	2	–	0
Western Carolina		–		7	–	2	–	1
Hawaii		–		8	–	3	–	0
Indiana State		–		7	–	3	–	0
Northeastern		–		6	–	2	–	0
Bucknell		–		6	–	3	–	0
Cortland		–		6	–	3	–	0
San Diego		–		6	–	3	–	1
Arkansas–Pine Bluff		–		4	–	2	–	1
Eastern Michigan		–		6	–	4	–	0
Milwaukee		–		6	–	4	–	0
Samford		–		5	–	3	–	2
Ball State		–		5	–	4	–	1
Lake Forest		–		4	–	3	–	1
Nevada		–		6	–	5	–	0
Central Michigan		–		5	–	5	–	1
Rose-Hulman		–		5	–	5	–	0
Santa Clara		–		4	–	4	–	1
Akron		–		3	–	4	–	2
St. Norbert		–		4	–	5	–	0
Saint Mary's		–		3	–	4	–	0
Kentucky State		–		4	–	6	–	0
Drexel		–		3	–	6	–	0
Northeast Louisiana		–		3	–	7	–	0
Portland State		–		3	–	8	–	0
Wayne State (MI)		–		2	–	5	–	1
Boston University		–		2	–	8	–	0
Northern Michigan		–		2	–	8	–	0
Saint Peter's		–		2	–	8	–	0
Chattanooga		–		2	–	9	–	0
Southern Illinois		–		1	–	8	–	1
Eastern Illinois		–		1	–	9	–	0
Madison		–		0	–	4	–	1
UNLV		–		1	–	10	–	0
Rankings from AP small college poll

The 1972 Ball State Cardinals football team was an American football team that represented Ball State University as an independent during the 1972 NCAA College Division football season. In its second season under head coach Dave McClain, the team compiled a 5–4–1 record. The team played its home games at Ball State Stadium in Muncie, Indiana.

== Schedule ==
Date	Time	Opponent	Site	Result	Attendance	Source
September 16		Central Michigan	Ball State Stadium; Muncie, IN	W 30–12	11,655	
September 23		at Butler	Butler Bowl; Indianapolis, IN	W 50–41	3,765	
September 30		Akron	Ball State Stadium; Muncie, IN (Band Day)	T 21–21	16,050	
October 7		at Indiana State	Memorial Stadium; Terre Haute, IN (Blue Key Victory Bell)	W 21–10	10,450	
October 14		Dayton^{†}	Ball State Stadium; Muncie, IN	W 28–7	16,650	
October 21		at Southern Illinois	McAndrew Stadium; Carbondale, IL	L 7–13	8,000–8,300	
October 28		Middle Tennessee	Ball State Stadium; Muncie, IN (Parents' Day)	W 24–0	8,725	
November 4		Western Illinois	Ball State Stadium; Muncie, IN	L 17–21	7,925	
November 11	1:30 p.m.	at Western Michigan	Waldo Stadium; Kalamazoo, MI	L 14–31	13,000	
November 18		at Illinois State	Hancock Stadium; Normal, IL	L 23–24	7,500	
^{†}Homecoming; All times are in Eastern time
