= 1972 UNLV Rebels football team =

American college football season

1972 UNLV Rebels football
- Conference: Independent
- Record: 1–10
- Head coach: Bill Ireland (5th season)
- Home stadium: Las Vegas Stadium

1972 NCAA College Division independents football records
| | Conf. | | | Overall |
| Team | W | L | T | W | | L | | T |
|---|---|---|---|---|---|---|---|---|
| No. 4 Ashland | | – | | 11 | – | 0 | – | 0 |
| Bridgeport | | – | | 11 | – | 0 | – | 0 |
| No. 1 Delaware | | – | | 10 | – | 0 | – | 0 |
| No. 5 Tennessee State | | – | | 11 | – | 1 | – | 0 |
| Colorado College | | – | | 8 | – | 1 | – | 0 |
| Tampa | | – | | 10 | – | 2 | – | 0 |
| Trinity (TX) | | – | | 8 | – | 2 | – | 0 |
| Western Carolina | | – | | 7 | – | 2 | – | 1 |
| Hawaii | | – | | 8 | – | 3 | – | 0 |
| Indiana State | | – | | 7 | – | 3 | – | 0 |
| Northeastern | | – | | 6 | – | 2 | – | 0 |
| Bucknell | | – | | 6 | – | 3 | – | 0 |
| Cortland | | – | | 6 | – | 3 | – | 0 |
| San Diego | | – | | 6 | – | 3 | – | 1 |
| Arkansas–Pine Bluff | | – | | 4 | – | 2 | – | 1 |
| Eastern Michigan | | – | | 6 | – | 4 | – | 0 |
| Milwaukee | | – | | 6 | – | 4 | – | 0 |
| Samford | | – | | 5 | – | 3 | – | 2 |
| Ball State | | – | | 5 | – | 4 | – | 1 |
| Lake Forest | | – | | 4 | – | 3 | – | 1 |
| Nevada | | – | | 6 | – | 5 | – | 0 |
| Central Michigan | | – | | 5 | – | 5 | – | 1 |
| Rose-Hulman | | – | | 5 | – | 5 | – | 0 |
| Santa Clara | | – | | 4 | – | 4 | – | 1 |
| Akron | | – | | 3 | – | 4 | – | 2 |
| St. Norbert | | – | | 4 | – | 5 | – | 0 |
| Saint Mary's | | – | | 3 | – | 4 | – | 0 |
| Kentucky State | | – | | 4 | – | 6 | – | 0 |
| Drexel | | – | | 3 | – | 6 | – | 0 |
| Northeast Louisiana | | – | | 3 | – | 7 | – | 0 |
| Portland State | | – | | 3 | – | 8 | – | 0 |
| Wayne State (MI) | | – | | 2 | – | 5 | – | 1 |
| Boston University | | – | | 2 | – | 8 | – | 0 |
| Northern Michigan | | – | | 2 | – | 8 | – | 0 |
| Saint Peter's | | – | | 2 | – | 8 | – | 0 |
| Chattanooga | | – | | 2 | – | 9 | – | 0 |
| Southern Illinois | | – | | 1 | – | 8 | – | 1 |
| Eastern Illinois | | – | | 1 | – | 9 | – | 0 |
| Madison | | – | | 0 | – | 4 | – | 1 |
| UNLV | | – | | 1 | – | 10 | – | 0 |
Rankings from AP small college poll

The 1972 UNLV Rebels football team was an American football team that represented the University of Nevada, Las Vegas as an independent during the 1972 NCAA College Division football season. In the fifth year of the football program, all under head coach Bill Ireland, the Rebels compiled a 1–10 record.

Las Vegas Stadium debuted the previous October, but its dedication game was this year's opener on September 9 against Western Illinois.

Following the season, Ireland stepped down and became the athletic director; he was succeeded as head coach by Ron Meyer.

== Schedule ==
| Date | Time | Opponent | Site | Result | Attendance | Source |
|---|---|---|---|---|---|---|
| September 9 | 7:30 p.m. | Western Illinois | Las Vegas Stadium; Whitney, NV | L 28–35 | 8,800 | |
| September 16 | 6:30 p.m. | at Boise State | Bronco Stadium; Boise, ID | L 16–36 | 13,418–14,000 | |
| September 23 | 7:30 p.m. | Cal State Los Angeles | Las Vegas Stadium; Whitney, NV | W 31–0 | 6,245 | |
| September 30 | 7:30 p.m. | UC Riverside | Las Vegas Stadium; Whitney, NV | L 7–14 | 6,180 | |
| October 7 | 7:30 p.m. | Missouri Southern | Las Vegas Stadium; Whitney, NV | L 0–7 | 5,124 | |
| October 14 | 7:30 p.m. | at Santa Clara | Buck Shaw Stadium; Santa Clara, CA | L 14–28 | 4,265 | |
| October 21 | 7:30 p.m. | Cal State Fullerton | Las Vegas Stadium; Whitney, NV | L 20–30 | 5,980–11,000 | |
| October 28 | 12:30 p.m. | at Weber State | Wildcat Stadium; Ogden, UT | L 0–30 | 6,723 | |
| November 4 | 4:31 p.m. | at Miami (FL) | Orange Bowl; Miami, FL | L 7–51 | 18,987–24,387 | |
| November 11 | 1:30 p.m. | North Dakota | Las Vegas Stadium; Whitney, NV | L 13–17 | 3,298 | |
| November 18 | 1:30 p.m. | Nevada^{†} | Las Vegas Stadium; Whitney, NV (Fremont Cannon) | L 13–41 | 5,186–8,000 | |
^{†}Homecoming; All times are in Pacific time
