= 1972 Eastern Michigan Hurons football team =

American college football season

1972 Eastern Michigan Hurons football
- Conference: Independent
- Record: 6–4
- Head coach: Dan Boisture (6th season)
- Defensive coordinator: Doug Graber (1st season)
- Captains: Bill Dulac; Darrell Mossburg
- Home stadium: Rynearson Stadium

1972 NCAA College Division independents football records
| | Conf. | | | Overall |
| Team | W | L | T | W | | L | | T |
|---|---|---|---|---|---|---|---|---|
| No. 4 Ashland | | – | | 11 | – | 0 | – | 0 |
| Bridgeport | | – | | 11 | – | 0 | – | 0 |
| No. 1 Delaware | | – | | 10 | – | 0 | – | 0 |
| No. 5 Tennessee State | | – | | 11 | – | 1 | – | 0 |
| Colorado College | | – | | 8 | – | 1 | – | 0 |
| Tampa | | – | | 10 | – | 2 | – | 0 |
| Trinity (TX) | | – | | 8 | – | 2 | – | 0 |
| Western Carolina | | – | | 7 | – | 2 | – | 1 |
| Hawaii | | – | | 8 | – | 3 | – | 0 |
| Indiana State | | – | | 7 | – | 3 | – | 0 |
| Northeastern | | – | | 6 | – | 2 | – | 0 |
| Bucknell | | – | | 6 | – | 3 | – | 0 |
| Cortland | | – | | 6 | – | 3 | – | 0 |
| San Diego | | – | | 6 | – | 3 | – | 1 |
| Arkansas–Pine Bluff | | – | | 4 | – | 2 | – | 1 |
| Eastern Michigan | | – | | 6 | – | 4 | – | 0 |
| Milwaukee | | – | | 6 | – | 4 | – | 0 |
| Samford | | – | | 5 | – | 3 | – | 2 |
| Ball State | | – | | 5 | – | 4 | – | 1 |
| Lake Forest | | – | | 4 | – | 3 | – | 1 |
| Nevada | | – | | 6 | – | 5 | – | 0 |
| Central Michigan | | – | | 5 | – | 5 | – | 1 |
| Rose-Hulman | | – | | 5 | – | 5 | – | 0 |
| Santa Clara | | – | | 4 | – | 4 | – | 1 |
| Akron | | – | | 3 | – | 4 | – | 2 |
| St. Norbert | | – | | 4 | – | 5 | – | 0 |
| Saint Mary's | | – | | 3 | – | 4 | – | 0 |
| Kentucky State | | – | | 4 | – | 6 | – | 0 |
| Drexel | | – | | 3 | – | 6 | – | 0 |
| Northeast Louisiana | | – | | 3 | – | 7 | – | 0 |
| Portland State | | – | | 3 | – | 8 | – | 0 |
| Wayne State (MI) | | – | | 2 | – | 5 | – | 1 |
| Boston University | | – | | 2 | – | 8 | – | 0 |
| Northern Michigan | | – | | 2 | – | 8 | – | 0 |
| Saint Peter's | | – | | 2 | – | 8 | – | 0 |
| Chattanooga | | – | | 2 | – | 9 | – | 0 |
| Southern Illinois | | – | | 1 | – | 8 | – | 1 |
| Illinois College | | – | | 1 | – | 8 | – | 0 |
| Eastern Illinois | | – | | 1 | – | 9 | – | 0 |
| Madison | | – | | 0 | – | 4 | – | 1 |
| UNLV | | – | | 1 | – | 10 | – | 0 |
Rankings from AP small college poll

The 1972 Eastern Michigan Hurons football team represented Eastern Michigan University as an independent during the 1972 NCAA College Division football season. In their sixth season under head coach Dan Boisture, the Hurons compiled a 6–4 record and outscored their opponents, 202 to 162. The team opened the season losing three of its first four games but ended the season with a 5–1 record in the final six games, including a 28–3 victory over Central Michigan.

== Schedule ==
| Date | Time | Opponent | Site | Result | Attendance | Source |
|---|---|---|---|---|---|---|
| September 9 | | at Wisconsin–Oshkosh | Titan Stadium; Oshkosh, WI | W 26–14 | 2,500 | |
| September 16 | 1:30 p.m. | Toledo | Rynearson Stadium; Ypsilanti, MI | L 0–16 | 16,300 | |
| September 22 | 8:04 p.m. | at Tampa | Tampa Stadium; Tampa, FL | L 0–42 | 14,407 | |
| October 7 | | Idaho State | Rynearson Stadium; Ypsilanti, MI | L 14–21 | 9,400 | |
| October 14 | | Quantico Marines^{†} | Rynearson Stadium; Ypsilanti, MI | W 21–7 | 13,874 | |
| October 21 | | at Northern Michigan | Memorial Stadium; Marquette, MI | W 24–15 | 5,415 | |
| October 28 | | New Mexico Highlands | Rynearson Stadium; Ypsilanti, MI | W 30–6 | 6,100 | |
| November 4 | | at St. Norbert | Minahan Stadium; De Pere, WI | W 42–14 | 2,500 | |
| November 11 | | at No. 2 Louisiana Tech | Louisiana Tech Stadium; Ruston, LA | L 17–24 | 15,736 | |
| November 18 | | at Central Michigan | Perry Shorts Stadium; Mount Pleasant, MI (rivalry) | W 28–3 | 12,000 | |
^{†}Homecoming; Rankings from AP Poll released prior to the game; All times are in Eastern time

== After the season ==
The following Hurons were selected in the 1973 NFL draft after the season.

| Round | Pick | Player | Position | NFL club |
|---|---|---|---|---|
| 7 | 167 | Bill DuLac | Guard | Los Angeles Rams |
| 10 | 260 | Ron Fernandes | Defensive end | Miami Dolphins |
