= 1972 Northeast Louisiana Indians football team =

American college football season

1972 Northeast Louisiana Indians football
- Conference: Independent
- Record: 3–7
- Head coach: Ollie Keller (1st season)
- Home stadium: Brown Stadium

1972 NCAA College Division independents football records
	Conf.			Overall
Team	W	L	T	W		L		T
No. 4 Ashland		–		11	–	0	–	0
Bridgeport		–		11	–	0	–	0
No. 1 Delaware		–		10	–	0	–	0
No. 5 Tennessee State		–		11	–	1	–	0
Colorado College		–		8	–	1	–	0
Tampa		–		10	–	2	–	0
Trinity (TX)		–		8	–	2	–	0
Western Carolina		–		7	–	2	–	1
Hawaii		–		8	–	3	–	0
Indiana State		–		7	–	3	–	0
Northeastern		–		6	–	2	–	0
Bucknell		–		6	–	3	–	0
Cortland		–		6	–	3	–	0
San Diego		–		6	–	3	–	1
Arkansas–Pine Bluff		–		4	–	2	–	1
Eastern Michigan		–		6	–	4	–	0
Milwaukee		–		6	–	4	–	0
Samford		–		5	–	3	–	2
Ball State		–		5	–	4	–	1
Lake Forest		–		4	–	3	–	1
Nevada		–		6	–	5	–	0
Central Michigan		–		5	–	5	–	1
Rose-Hulman		–		5	–	5	–	0
Santa Clara		–		4	–	4	–	1
Akron		–		3	–	4	–	2
St. Norbert		–		4	–	5	–	0
Saint Mary's		–		3	–	4	–	0
Kentucky State		–		4	–	6	–	0
Drexel		–		3	–	6	–	0
Northeast Louisiana		–		3	–	7	–	0
Portland State		–		3	–	8	–	0
Wayne State (MI)		–		2	–	5	–	1
Boston University		–		2	–	8	–	0
Northern Michigan		–		2	–	8	–	0
Saint Peter's		–		2	–	8	–	0
Chattanooga		–		2	–	9	–	0
Southern Illinois		–		1	–	8	–	1
Eastern Illinois		–		1	–	9	–	0
Madison		–		0	–	4	–	1
UNLV		–		1	–	10	–	0
Rankings from AP small college poll

The 1972 Northeast Louisiana Indians football team was an American football team that represented Northeast Louisiana University (now known as the University of Louisiana at Monroe) as an independent during the 1972 NCAA College Division football season. In their first year under head coach Ollie Keller, the team compiled a 3–7 record.

== Schedule ==
Date	Time	Opponent	Site	Result	Attendance	Source
September 9		Quantico Marines	Brown Stadium; Monroe, LA	W 10–6	8,300	
September 16		at Mississippi State	Scott Field; Starkville, MS	L 7–42	21,000	
September 23		at Richmond	City Stadium; Richmond, VA	L 0–17	7,500	
September 30		Northwestern State	Brown Stadium; Monroe, LA (rivalry)	L 7–17	8,300	
October 7		at Nicholls State	Colonel Stadium; Thibodaux, LA	W 27–7	7,000	
October 14		at McNeese State	Cowboy Stadium; Lake Charles, LA	L 14–31	12,600	
October 21		at Southeastern Louisiana	Strawberry Stadium; Hammond, LA	W 34–9	6,000	
November 4		Arkansas State	Brown Stadium; Monroe, LA	L 13–14	8,300	
November 11	1:30 p.m.	at Drake	Drake Stadium; Des Moines, IA	L 7–35	9,000–10,500	
November 18		Louisiana Tech	Brown Stadium; Monroe, LA (rivalry)	L 6–10	6,000–7,000	
All times are in Central time
