= 1972 Chattanooga Moccasins football team =

American college football season

1972 Chattanooga Moccasins football
- Conference: Independent
- Record: 2–9
- Head coach: Harold Wilkes (5th season)
- Home stadium: Chamberlain Field

1972 NCAA College Division independents football records
	Conf.			Overall
Team	W	L	T	W		L		T
No. 4 Ashland		–		11	–	0	–	0
Bridgeport		–		11	–	0	–	0
No. 1 Delaware		–		10	–	0	–	0
No. 5 Tennessee State		–		11	–	1	–	0
Colorado College		–		8	–	1	–	0
Tampa		–		10	–	2	–	0
Trinity (TX)		–		8	–	2	–	0
Western Carolina		–		7	–	2	–	1
Hawaii		–		8	–	3	–	0
Indiana State		–		7	–	3	–	0
Northeastern		–		6	–	2	–	0
Bucknell		–		6	–	3	–	0
Cortland		–		6	–	3	–	0
San Diego		–		6	–	3	–	1
Arkansas–Pine Bluff		–		4	–	2	–	1
Eastern Michigan		–		6	–	4	–	0
Milwaukee		–		6	–	4	–	0
Samford		–		5	–	3	–	2
Ball State		–		5	–	4	–	1
Lake Forest		–		4	–	3	–	1
Nevada		–		6	–	5	–	0
Central Michigan		–		5	–	5	–	1
Rose-Hulman		–		5	–	5	–	0
Santa Clara		–		4	–	4	–	1
Akron		–		3	–	4	–	2
St. Norbert		–		4	–	5	–	0
Saint Mary's		–		3	–	4	–	0
Kentucky State		–		4	–	6	–	0
Drexel		–		3	–	6	–	0
Northeast Louisiana		–		3	–	7	–	0
Portland State		–		3	–	8	–	0
Wayne State (MI)		–		2	–	5	–	1
Boston University		–		2	–	8	–	0
Northern Michigan		–		2	–	8	–	0
Saint Peter's		–		2	–	8	–	0
Chattanooga		–		2	–	9	–	0
Southern Illinois		–		1	–	8	–	1
Illinois College		–		1	–	8	–	0
Eastern Illinois		–		1	–	9	–	0
Madison		–		0	–	4	–	1
UNLV		–		1	–	10	–	0
Rankings from AP small college poll

The 1972 Chattanooga Moccasins football team was an American football team that represented the University of Tennessee at Chattanooga during the 1972 NCAA College Division football season. In their fifth year under head coach Harold Wilkes, the team compiled a 2–9 record.

== Schedule ==
Date	Opponent	Site	Result	Attendance	Source
September 9	at Vanderbilt	Dudley Field; Nashville, TN	L 7–24	19,500	
September 23	at Auburn	Cliff Hare Stadium; Auburn, AL	L 7–14	42,000–43,000	
September 30	Middle Tennessee	Chamberlain Field; Chattanooga, TN	L 13–17	9,000	
October 7	Arkansas State^{†}	Chamberlain Field; Chattanooga, TN	W 21–3	8,000	
October 14	Southwestern Louisiana	Chamberlain Field; Chattanooga, TN	L 21–22	7,500	
October 21	The Citadel	Chamberlain Field; Chattanooga, TN	L 0–12	5,000	
October 28	at Tennessee Tech	Tucker Stadium; Cookeville, TN	L 8–24	8,000	
November 4	at East Carolina	Ficklen Memorial Stadium; Greenville, NC	L 7–33	17,786	
November 11	at Southern Miss	Faulkner Field; Hattiesburg, MS	W 10–6	14,200	
November 18	VMI	Chamberlain Field; Chattanooga, TN	L 0–17	1,500	
November 25	at East Tennessee State	Memorial Stadium; Johnson City, TN	L 0–35	2,500	
^{†}Homecoming
