= 1972 Nevada Wolf Pack football team =

American college football season

1972 Nevada Wolf Pack football
- Conference: Independent
- Record: 6–5
- Head coach: Jerry Scattini (4th season)
- Home stadium: Mackay Stadium

1972 NCAA College Division independents football records
	Conf.			Overall
Team	W	L	T	W		L		T
No. 4 Ashland		–		11	–	0	–	0
Bridgeport		–		11	–	0	–	0
No. 1 Delaware		–		10	–	0	–	0
No. 5 Tennessee State		–		11	–	1	–	0
Colorado College		–		8	–	1	–	0
Tampa		–		10	–	2	–	0
Trinity (TX)		–		8	–	2	–	0
Western Carolina		–		7	–	2	–	1
Hawaii		–		8	–	3	–	0
Indiana State		–		7	–	3	–	0
Northeastern		–		6	–	2	–	0
Bucknell		–		6	–	3	–	0
Cortland		–		6	–	3	–	0
San Diego		–		6	–	3	–	1
Arkansas–Pine Bluff		–		4	–	2	–	1
Eastern Michigan		–		6	–	4	–	0
Milwaukee		–		6	–	4	–	0
Samford		–		5	–	3	–	2
Ball State		–		5	–	4	–	1
Lake Forest		–		4	–	3	–	1
Nevada		–		6	–	5	–	0
Central Michigan		–		5	–	5	–	1
Rose-Hulman		–		5	–	5	–	0
Santa Clara		–		4	–	4	–	1
Akron		–		3	–	4	–	2
St. Norbert		–		4	–	5	–	0
Saint Mary's		–		3	–	4	–	0
Kentucky State		–		4	–	6	–	0
Drexel		–		3	–	6	–	0
Northeast Louisiana		–		3	–	7	–	0
Portland State		–		3	–	8	–	0
Wayne State (MI)		–		2	–	5	–	1
Boston University		–		2	–	8	–	0
Northern Michigan		–		2	–	8	–	0
Saint Peter's		–		2	–	8	–	0
Chattanooga		–		2	–	9	–	0
Southern Illinois		–		1	–	8	–	1
Eastern Illinois		–		1	–	9	–	0
Madison		–		0	–	4	–	1
UNLV		–		1	–	10	–	0
Rankings from AP small college poll

The 1972 Nevada Wolf Pack football team represented the University of Nevada, Reno as an independent during the 1972 NCAA College Division football season. Led by fourth-year head coach Jerry Scattini, the Wolf Pack compiled a record of 6–5. The team played home games at Mackay Stadium in Reno, Nevada.

== Schedule ==
Date	Opponent	Site	Result	Attendance	Source
September 9	San Francisco State	Mackay Stadium; Reno, NV	W 37–6	4,000	
September 16	at Cal State Fullerton	Santa Ana Stadium; Santa Ana, CA	L 6–13	2,515–4,200	
September 30	at Sacramento State	Hornet Stadium; Sacramento, CA	L 14–19	2,000–3,800	
October 7	Portland State	Civic Stadium; Portland, OR	W 27–13	2,500	
October 14	at No. 8 Boise State	Bronco Stadium; Boise, ID (rivalry)	L 19–56	8,000–10,336	
October 21	Santa Clara^{†}	Mackay Stadium; Reno, NV	W 21–7	4,100–5,042	
October 28	No. 3 Cal Poly	Mackay Stadium; Reno, NV	L 12–14	3,500–4,200	
November 4	Chico State	Mackay Stadium; Reno, NV	W 48–32	1,000–2,000	
November 11	Cal State Hayward	Mackay Stadium; Reno, NV	W 48–8	1,500–2,109	
November 18	at UNLV	Las Vegas Stadium; East Las Vegas, NV (Fremont Cannon)	W 41–13	5,186–8,000	
November 25	at No. T–6 Grambling	Grambling Stadium; Grambling, LA	L 3–37	14,000	
^{†}Homecoming; Rankings from AP Poll released prior to the game
