= 1972 Akron Zips football team =

American college football season

1972 Akron Zips football
- Conference: Independent
- Record: 3–4–2
- Head coach: Gordon K. Larson (12th season)
- Captain: Bruce Walker; Calvin Pierce
- Home stadium: Rubber Bowl

1972 NCAA College Division independents football records
	Conf.			Overall
Team	W	L	T	W		L		T
No. 4 Ashland		–		11	–	0	–	0
Bridgeport		–		11	–	0	–	0
No. 1 Delaware		–		10	–	0	–	0
No. 5 Tennessee State		–		11	–	1	–	0
Colorado College		–		8	–	1	–	0
Tampa		–		10	–	2	–	0
Trinity (TX)		–		8	–	2	–	0
Western Carolina		–		7	–	2	–	1
Hawaii		–		8	–	3	–	0
Indiana State		–		7	–	3	–	0
Northeastern		–		6	–	2	–	0
Bucknell		–		6	–	3	–	0
Cortland		–		6	–	3	–	0
San Diego		–		6	–	3	–	1
Arkansas–Pine Bluff		–		4	–	2	–	1
Eastern Michigan		–		6	–	4	–	0
Milwaukee		–		6	–	4	–	0
Samford		–		5	–	3	–	2
Ball State		–		5	–	4	–	1
Lake Forest		–		4	–	3	–	1
Nevada		–		6	–	5	–	0
Central Michigan		–		5	–	5	–	1
Rose-Hulman		–		5	–	5	–	0
Santa Clara		–		4	–	4	–	1
Akron		–		3	–	4	–	2
St. Norbert		–		4	–	5	–	0
Saint Mary's		–		3	–	4	–	0
Kentucky State		–		4	–	6	–	0
Drexel		–		3	–	6	–	0
Northeast Louisiana		–		3	–	7	–	0
Portland State		–		3	–	8	–	0
Wayne State (MI)		–		2	–	5	–	1
Boston University		–		2	–	8	–	0
Northern Michigan		–		2	–	8	–	0
Saint Peter's		–		2	–	8	–	0
Chattanooga		–		2	–	9	–	0
Southern Illinois		–		1	–	8	–	1
Illinois College		–		1	–	8	–	0
Eastern Illinois		–		1	–	9	–	0
Madison		–		0	–	4	–	1
UNLV		–		1	–	10	–	0
Rankings from AP small college poll

The 1972 Akron Zips football team represented Akron University in the 1972 NCAA College Division football season as an independent. The team was led by 12th-year head coach Gordon K. Larson, in his final season. The Zips played their home games at the Rubber Bowl in Akron, Ohio, finished the season with a record of 3–4–2, and outscored their opponents 193–148.

== Schedule ==
Date	Time	Opponent	Site	Result	Attendance	Source
September 9	7:30 p.m.	Kent State	Rubber Bowl; Akron, OH (Wagon Wheel)	T 13–13	25,121	
September 16		at Butler	Butler Bowl; Indianapolis, IN	W 34–7	5,150	
September 23		Western Illinois	Rubber Bowl; Akron, OH	L 24–30	21,464	
September 30		at Ball State	Ball State Stadium; Muncie, IN	T 21–21	16,050	
October 14		Northern Michigan	Rubber Bowl; Akron, OH	W 49–0	10,042	
October 21		at Youngstown State	Rayen Stadium; Youngstown, OH (Steel Tire)	L 21–22	4,760	
October 28		Central Michigan	Rubber Bowl; Akron, OH	W 14–10	9,703	
November 4		at Indiana State	Memorial Stadium; Terre Haute, IN	L 17–21	7,200	
November 11		Quantico Marines	Rubber Bowl; Akron, OH	L 0–24		
All times are in Eastern time
