= 1972 Milwaukee Panthers football team =

American college football season

1972 Milwaukee Panthers football
- Conference: Independent
- Record: 6–4
- Head coach: Jerry Fishbain (2nd season)
- Home stadium: Shorewood Stadium

1972 NCAA College Division independents football records
	Conf.			Overall
Team	W	L	T	W		L		T
No. 4 Ashland		–		11	–	0	–	0
Bridgeport		–		11	–	0	–	0
No. 1 Delaware		–		10	–	0	–	0
No. 5 Tennessee State		–		11	–	1	–	0
Colorado College		–		8	–	1	–	0
Tampa		–		10	–	2	–	0
Trinity (TX)		–		8	–	2	–	0
Western Carolina		–		7	–	2	–	1
Hawaii		–		8	–	3	–	0
Indiana State		–		7	–	3	–	0
Northeastern		–		6	–	2	–	0
Bucknell		–		6	–	3	–	0
Cortland		–		6	–	3	–	0
San Diego		–		6	–	3	–	1
Arkansas–Pine Bluff		–		4	–	2	–	1
Eastern Michigan		–		6	–	4	–	0
Milwaukee		–		6	–	4	–	0
Samford		–		5	–	3	–	2
Ball State		–		5	–	4	–	1
Lake Forest		–		4	–	3	–	1
Nevada		–		6	–	5	–	0
Central Michigan		–		5	–	5	–	1
Rose-Hulman		–		5	–	5	–	0
Santa Clara		–		4	–	4	–	1
Akron		–		3	–	4	–	2
St. Norbert		–		4	–	5	–	0
Saint Mary's		–		3	–	4	–	0
Kentucky State		–		4	–	6	–	0
Drexel		–		3	–	6	–	0
Northeast Louisiana		–		3	–	7	–	0
Portland State		–		3	–	8	–	0
Wayne State (MI)		–		2	–	5	–	1
Boston University		–		2	–	8	–	0
Northern Michigan		–		2	–	8	–	0
Saint Peter's		–		2	–	8	–	0
Chattanooga		–		2	–	9	–	0
Southern Illinois		–		1	–	8	–	1
Illinois College		–		1	–	8	–	0
Eastern Illinois		–		1	–	9	–	0
Madison		–		0	–	4	–	1
UNLV		–		1	–	10	–	0
Rankings from AP small college poll

The 1972 Milwaukee Panthers football team represented the University of Wisconsin–Milwaukee as an independent during the 1972 NCAA College Division football season. Led by Jerry Fishbain in his second and final season as head coach, Milwaukee compiled a record of 6–4. The Panthers offense scored 150 points while the defense allowed 103 points.

== Schedule ==
Date	Opponent	Site	Result	Attendance	Source
September 9	at Northland	Weikal Field; Ashland, WI	W 21–13	2,000	
September 16	Winona State	Shorewood Stadium; Shorewood, WI	W 27–0	4,500	
September 23	at Eastern Illinois	O'Brien Field; Charleston, IL	W 17–16	8,000	
September 30	at Western Illinois	Hanson Field; Macomb, IL	L 3–31	10,500	
October 7	at Missouri–Rolla	Jackling Field; Rolla, MO	W 20–7	5,000	
October 14	Chicago Circle	Shorewood Stadium; Shorewood, WI	W 28–0	4,000	
October 21	Minnesota–Morris	Shorewood Stadium; Shorewood, WI	L 3–16	3,500	
October 28	St. Norbert	Shorewood Stadium; Shorewood, WI	L 0–6	3,800	
November 4	Wayne State (MI)	Shorewood Stadium; Shorewood, WI	W 28–7	4,100	
November 11	at Ferris State	Top Taggart Field; Big Rapids, MI	L 3–7	3,500	
