= 1972 Hawaii Rainbows football team =

American college football season

1972 Hawaii Rainbows football
- Conference: Independent
- Record: 8–3
- Head coach: Dave Holmes (5th season)
- Home stadium: Honolulu Stadium

1972 NCAA College Division independents football records
	Conf.			Overall
Team	W	L	T	W		L		T
No. 4 Ashland		–		11	–	0	–	0
Bridgeport		–		11	–	0	–	0
No. 1 Delaware		–		10	–	0	–	0
No. 5 Tennessee State		–		11	–	1	–	0
Colorado College		–		8	–	1	–	0
Tampa		–		10	–	2	–	0
Trinity (TX)		–		8	–	2	–	0
Western Carolina		–		7	–	2	–	1
Hawaii		–		8	–	3	–	0
Indiana State		–		7	–	3	–	0
Northeastern		–		6	–	2	–	0
Bucknell		–		6	–	3	–	0
Cortland		–		6	–	3	–	0
San Diego		–		6	–	3	–	1
Arkansas–Pine Bluff		–		4	–	2	–	1
Eastern Michigan		–		6	–	4	–	0
Milwaukee		–		6	–	4	–	0
Samford		–		5	–	3	–	2
Ball State		–		5	–	4	–	1
Lake Forest		–		4	–	3	–	1
Nevada		–		6	–	5	–	0
Central Michigan		–		5	–	5	–	1
Rose-Hulman		–		5	–	5	–	0
Santa Clara		–		4	–	4	–	1
Akron		–		3	–	4	–	2
St. Norbert		–		4	–	5	–	0
Saint Mary's		–		3	–	4	–	0
Kentucky State		–		4	–	6	–	0
Drexel		–		3	–	6	–	0
Northeast Louisiana		–		3	–	7	–	0
Portland State		–		3	–	8	–	0
Wayne State (MI)		–		2	–	5	–	1
Boston University		–		2	–	8	–	0
Northern Michigan		–		2	–	8	–	0
Saint Peter's		–		2	–	8	–	0
Chattanooga		–		2	–	9	–	0
Southern Illinois		–		1	–	8	–	1
Eastern Illinois		–		1	–	9	–	0
Madison		–		0	–	4	–	1
UNLV		–		1	–	10	–	0
Rankings from AP small college poll

The 1972 Hawaii Rainbows football team represented the University of Hawaiʻi at Mānoa as an independent during the 1972 NCAA College Division football season. In their fifth season under head coach Dave Holmes, the Rainbows compiled a 8–3 record.

== Schedule ==
Date	Time	Opponent	Site	Result	Attendance	Source
September 16		at Portland State	Civic Stadium; Portland, OR	W 38–13	5,514	
September 23		Cal Lutheran	Honolulu Stadium; Honolulu, HI	W 38–10	17,590	
October 7		Puget Sound	Honolulu Stadium; Honolulu, HI	W 27–10	17,067	
October 14		Cal State Fullerton^{†}	Honolulu Stadium; Honolulu, HI	W 49–15	16,324	
October 21		Montana	Honolulu Stadium; Honolulu, HI	W 30–3	17,901	
October 28		at No. 16 Tennessee	Neyland Stadium; Knoxville, TN	L 2–34	63,903	
November 4		Grambling	Honolulu Stadium; Honolulu, HI	L 7–46	23,003	
November 11		Northern Arizona	Honolulu Stadium; Honolulu, HI	W 20–13	13,100	
November 18		Linfield	Honolulu Stadium; Honolulu, HI	W 36–17	12,769	
November 25	7:30 p.m.	San Jose State	Honolulu Stadium; Honolulu, HI (rivalry)	W 28–15	14,912	
December 2		Stanford	Honolulu Stadium; Honolulu, HI	L 7–39	18,397	
^{†}Homecoming; Rankings from AP Poll released prior to the game; All times are in Hawaii–Aleutian time
