= 1972 Ashland Eagles football team =

American college football season

1972 Ashland Eagles football
- Conference: Independent
- Record: 11–0
- Head coach: Fred Martinelli (14th season)
- Home stadium: Community Stadium

1972 NCAA College Division independents football records
	Conf.			Overall
Team	W	L	T	W		L		T
No. 4 Ashland		–		11	–	0	–	0
Bridgeport		–		11	–	0	–	0
No. 1 Delaware		–		10	–	0	–	0
No. 5 Tennessee State		–		11	–	1	–	0
Colorado College		–		8	–	1	–	0
Tampa		–		10	–	2	–	0
Trinity (TX)		–		8	–	2	–	0
Western Carolina		–		7	–	2	–	1
Hawaii		–		8	–	3	–	0
Indiana State		–		7	–	3	–	0
Northeastern		–		6	–	2	–	0
Bucknell		–		6	–	3	–	0
Cortland		–		6	–	3	–	0
San Diego		–		6	–	3	–	1
Arkansas–Pine Bluff		–		4	–	2	–	1
Eastern Michigan		–		6	–	4	–	0
Milwaukee		–		6	–	4	–	0
Samford		–		5	–	3	–	2
Ball State		–		5	–	4	–	1
Lake Forest		–		4	–	3	–	1
Nevada		–		6	–	5	–	0
Central Michigan		–		5	–	5	–	1
Rose-Hulman		–		5	–	5	–	0
Santa Clara		–		4	–	4	–	1
Akron		–		3	–	4	–	2
St. Norbert		–		4	–	5	–	0
Saint Mary's		–		3	–	4	–	0
Kentucky State		–		4	–	6	–	0
Drexel		–		3	–	6	–	0
Northeast Louisiana		–		3	–	7	–	0
Portland State		–		3	–	8	–	0
Wayne State (MI)		–		2	–	5	–	1
Boston University		–		2	–	8	–	0
Northern Michigan		–		2	–	8	–	0
Saint Peter's		–		2	–	8	–	0
Chattanooga		–		2	–	9	–	0
Southern Illinois		–		1	–	8	–	1
Eastern Illinois		–		1	–	9	–	0
Madison		–		0	–	4	–	1
UNLV		–		1	–	10	–	0
Rankings from AP small college poll

The 1972 Ashland Eagles football team was an American football team that represented Ashland University as an independent during the 1972 NCAA College Division football season. In their 14th year under head coach Fred Martinelli, the Eagles compiled a perfect 11–0 record and outscored all opponents by a total of 354 to 62. The team set 45 school records, led the nation in defense, and was ranked fourth and seventh in the small college polls.

The team's statistical leaders included Ron Slater with 1,689 passing yards; Bob Mahl with 648 rushing yards; Bob Rosati with 794 receiving yards; and John Viar with 72 points scored.

The team played its home games at Community Stadium in Ashland, Ohio.

== Schedule ==
Date	Opponent	Rank	Site	Result	Attendance	Source
September 9	at Franklin (IN)		Franklin, IN	W 14–7	1,800	
September 16	Capital		Community Stadium; Ashland, OH	W 17–7	5,200	
September 23	at Edinboro		Edinboro, PA	W 51–7	5,500	
September 30	Wittenberg		Community Stadium; Ashland, OH	W 33–3	5,100	
October 7	at Muskingum		New Concord, OH	W 23–10	3,000	
October 14	Central State (OH)		Community Stadium; Ashland, OH	W 27–9	5,200	
October 21	at Ohio Northern	No. 10	Ada, OH	W 27–10	3,200	
October 28	Hillsdale	No. 7	Community Stadium; Ashland, OH	W 20–6	5,600	
November 4	at Waynesburg	No. 5	Waynesburg, PA	W 41–0	1,100–1,200	
November 11	Northwood	No. 6	Community Stadium; Ashland, OH	W 55–0	4,600	
November 18	at Fairmont State	No. 4	Fairmont, WV	W 46–3	1,000–1,200	
Rankings from AP Poll released prior to the game
