= 1972 Indiana State Sycamores football team =

American college football season

1972 Indiana State Sycamores football
- Conference: Independent
- Record: 7–3
- Head coach: Jerry Huntsman (7th season)
- Home stadium: Memorial Stadium

1972 NCAA College Division independents football records
	Conf.			Overall
Team	W	L	T	W		L		T
No. 4 Ashland		–		11	–	0	–	0
Bridgeport		–		11	–	0	–	0
No. 1 Delaware		–		10	–	0	–	0
No. 5 Tennessee State		–		11	–	1	–	0
Colorado College		–		8	–	1	–	0
Tampa		–		10	–	2	–	0
Trinity (TX)		–		8	–	2	–	0
Western Carolina		–		7	–	2	–	1
Hawaii		–		8	–	3	–	0
Indiana State		–		7	–	3	–	0
Northeastern		–		6	–	2	–	0
Bucknell		–		6	–	3	–	0
Cortland		–		6	–	3	–	0
San Diego		–		6	–	3	–	1
Arkansas–Pine Bluff		–		4	–	2	–	1
Eastern Michigan		–		6	–	4	–	0
Milwaukee		–		6	–	4	–	0
Samford		–		5	–	3	–	2
Ball State		–		5	–	4	–	1
Lake Forest		–		4	–	3	–	1
Nevada		–		6	–	5	–	0
Central Michigan		–		5	–	5	–	1
Rose-Hulman		–		5	–	5	–	0
Santa Clara		–		4	–	4	–	1
Akron		–		3	–	4	–	2
St. Norbert		–		4	–	5	–	0
Saint Mary's		–		3	–	4	–	0
Kentucky State		–		4	–	6	–	0
Drexel		–		3	–	6	–	0
Northeast Louisiana		–		3	–	7	–	0
Portland State		–		3	–	8	–	0
Wayne State (MI)		–		2	–	5	–	1
Boston University		–		2	–	8	–	0
Northern Michigan		–		2	–	8	–	0
Saint Peter's		–		2	–	8	–	0
Chattanooga		–		2	–	9	–	0
Southern Illinois		–		1	–	8	–	1
Eastern Illinois		–		1	–	9	–	0
Madison		–		0	–	4	–	1
UNLV		–		1	–	10	–	0
Rankings from AP small college poll

The 1972 Indiana State Sycamores football team was an American football team that represented Indiana State University as an independent in the 1972 NCAA College Division football season. In their seventh and final season under head coach Jerry Huntsman, the Sycamores compiled a 7–3 record and outscored opponents by a total of 236 to 141. After losing three of their first four games, the Sycamores finished the season on a five-game winning streak. They narrowly lost the season opener against University Division opponent Cincinnati, dropping a touchdown pass in the end zone with 20 seconds remaining in the game. Huntsman referred to it as his best team at Indiana State.

The team tallied a school-record 2,647 rushing yards (264.7 per game) led by senior fullback Willie Lee who set school records in rushing (957 yards on 172 carries), touchdowns (13), and points scored (78). Junior Rick Murphy led the College Division with 32.1 yards per return on 22 kickoff returns.

== Schedule ==
Date	Time	Opponent	Site	Result	Attendance	Source
September 9	8:00 p.m.	Cincinnati	Memorial Stadium; Terre Haute, IN	L 7–10	13,500	
September 16	2:00 p.m.	at Eastern Illinois	Lincoln Field; Charleston, IL	W 17–14	7,500	
September 23	1:30 p.m.	Evansville	Memorial Stadium; Terre Haute, IN	W 28–6	11,600	
October 30	1:30 p.m.	at Central Michigan	Kelly/Shorts Stadium; Mt. Pleasant, MI	L 0-34	9,725	
October 7	8:00 p.m.	Ball State	Memorial Stadium; Terre Haute, IN (Blue Key Victory Bell)	L 10–21	10,450	
October 14	7:30 p.m.	at Illinois State	Hancock Stadium; Normal, IL	W 32–8	10,000	
October 21	8:00 p.m.	Butler	Memorial Stadium; Terre Haute, IN	W 49–21	4,500	
October 28	2:00 p.m.	Western Illinois^{†}	Memorial Stadium; Terre Haute, IN	W 41–7	17,230	
November 4	2:00 p.m.	Akron	Memorial Stadium; Terre Haute, IN	W 21–17	7,200	
November 18	8:30 p.m.	at Southern Illinois	McAndrew Stadium; Carbondale, IL	W 31–3	2,600	
^{†}Homecoming; All times are in Eastern time

== Statistics and honors ==
The Sycamores tallied 2,647 rushing yards (264.7 per game) and 827 passing yards (82.7 per game). On defense, they gave up 1,544 rushing yards (154.4 per game) and 1,206 passing yards (120.6 per game). The team's rushing offense was the best in school history to that time.

Senior fullback Willie Lee established school records in rushing (957 yards on 172 carries), touchdowns (13), and points scored (78). Lee's 78 points tied with Mark Freeman of Evansville for the Indiana college football individual scoring title. Lee also had the team's longest play from scrimmage with an 80-yard touchdown run against Southern Illinois.

Senior quarterback Roger Voorhis led the team in passing, completing 25 of 69 passes for 454 yards, two touchdowns, and nine interceptions.

Junior split end Glenn Damato was the team's leading receiver with 25 catches for 460 yards. Damato was also the punter, averaging 35.4 yards on 51 punts

Junior halfback Tom Lenz also served as the team's placekicker and ranked second on the team in scoring, tallying 66 points on four touchdowns, 30 of 31 extra point kicks, and four of six field goal attempts.

Junior Rick Murphy, a five-foot-nine-inch, 154-pound defensive back from Lafayette, Indiana, led the College Division with 32.1 yards per return on 22 kickoff returns. His longest was an 84-yard return to lead the Sycamores to a comeback victory over Eastern Illinois. Murphy also returned 19 punts for 115 yards and two pass interceptions for 34 yards. He later played in the World Football League (WFL).

Three Indiana State players were recognized on the 1972 Associated Press (AP) College Division All-America team. Offensive guard Bob Poss (offensive guard) became the first Indiana State player to be named to the AP second team; Willie Lee and linebacker John Karazsia received honorable mention.
