= 1972 Central Michigan Chippewas football team =

American college football season

1972 Central Michigan Chippewas football
- Conference: Independent
- Record: 5–5–1
- Head coach: Roy Kramer (6th season)
- Defensive coordinator: Herb Deromedi (4th season)
- MVP: Chuck Markey
- Home stadium: Perry Shorts Stadium

1972 NCAA College Division independents football records
	Conf.			Overall
Team	W	L	T	W		L		T
No. 4 Ashland		–		11	–	0	–	0
Bridgeport		–		11	–	0	–	0
No. 1 Delaware		–		10	–	0	–	0
No. 5 Tennessee State		–		11	–	1	–	0
Colorado College		–		8	–	1	–	0
Tampa		–		10	–	2	–	0
Trinity (TX)		–		8	–	2	–	0
Western Carolina		–		7	–	2	–	1
Hawaii		–		8	–	3	–	0
Indiana State		–		7	–	3	–	0
Northeastern		–		6	–	2	–	0
Bucknell		–		6	–	3	–	0
Cortland		–		6	–	3	–	0
San Diego		–		6	–	3	–	1
Arkansas–Pine Bluff		–		4	–	2	–	1
Eastern Michigan		–		6	–	4	–	0
Milwaukee		–		6	–	4	–	0
Samford		–		5	–	3	–	2
Ball State		–		5	–	4	–	1
Lake Forest		–		4	–	3	–	1
Nevada		–		6	–	5	–	0
Central Michigan		–		5	–	5	–	1
Rose-Hulman		–		5	–	5	–	0
Santa Clara		–		4	–	4	–	1
Akron		–		3	–	4	–	2
St. Norbert		–		4	–	5	–	0
Saint Mary's		–		3	–	4	–	0
Kentucky State		–		4	–	6	–	0
Drexel		–		3	–	6	–	0
Northeast Louisiana		–		3	–	7	–	0
Portland State		–		3	–	8	–	0
Wayne State (MI)		–		2	–	5	–	1
Boston University		–		2	–	8	–	0
Northern Michigan		–		2	–	8	–	0
Saint Peter's		–		2	–	8	–	0
Chattanooga		–		2	–	9	–	0
Southern Illinois		–		1	–	8	–	1
Illinois College		–		1	–	8	–	0
Eastern Illinois		–		1	–	9	–	0
Madison		–		0	–	4	–	1
UNLV		–		1	–	10	–	0
Rankings from AP small college poll

The 1972 Central Michigan Chippewas football team represented Central Michigan University as an independent during the 1972 NCAA College Division football season. In their sixth season under head coach Roy Kramer, the Chippewas compiled a 5–5–1 record and outscored their opponents, 265 to 190.

On November 4, 1972, the team played its first game at its new stadium, R. Perry Shorts Stadium. The dedication game drew a crowd of 17,000. The new facility was built at a cost of $2 million and had a seating capacity of 19,875. The Chippewas defeated Illinois State, 28-21, in the dedication game.

The team's statistical leaders included quarterback Gary Bevington with 834 passing yards, tailback Chuck Markey with 1,513 rushing yards, and Matt Means with 603 receiving yards. Markey received the team's most valuable player award. Means set a school record with 10 receptions in a 34-0 victory over Indiana State on September 30, 1972.

== Schedule ==
Date	Time	Opponent	Site	Result	Attendance	Source
September 9	1:30 p.m.	at Ohio	Peden Stadium; Athens, OH	L 21–26	10,473	
September 16		at Ball State	Scheumann Stadium; Muncie, IN	L 12–30	11,665	
September 23		at Northern Michigan	Marquette, MI	W 26–9	6,800	
September 30		Indiana State	Perry Shorts Stadium; Mount Pleasant, MI	W 34–0	9,725	
October 7		No. 10 Western Illinois	Perry Shorts Stadium; Mount Pleasant, MI	L 19–20	9,575	
October 14		Eastern Kentucky	Perry Shorts Stadium; Mount Pleasant, MI	W 21–14	10,550	
October 21		at Eastern Illinois	O'Brien Field; Normal, IL	W 63–0	1,000	
October 28		at Akron	Rubber Bowl; Akron, OH	L 10–14	9,703	
November 4		Illinois State	Perry Shorts Stadium; Mount Pleasant, MI	W 28–21	17,000	
November 11		at Youngstown State	Youngstown, OH	T 28–28	4,460	
November 18		Eastern Michigan	Perry Shorts Stadium; Mount Pleasant, MI (rivalry)	L 3–28	12,000	
Rankings from AP Poll released prior to the game; All times are in Eastern time
