= 1972 Southern Illinois Salukis football team =

American college football season

1972 Southern Illinois Salukis football
- Conference: Independent
- Record: 1–8–1
- Head coach: Dick Towers (6th season)
- Home stadium: McAndrew Stadium

1972 NCAA College Division independents football records
	Conf.			Overall
Team	W	L	T	W		L		T
No. 4 Ashland		–		11	–	0	–	0
Bridgeport		–		11	–	0	–	0
No. 1 Delaware		–		10	–	0	–	0
No. 5 Tennessee State		–		11	–	1	–	0
Colorado College		–		8	–	1	–	0
Tampa		–		10	–	2	–	0
Trinity (TX)		–		8	–	2	–	0
Western Carolina		–		7	–	2	–	1
Hawaii		–		8	–	3	–	0
Indiana State		–		7	–	3	–	0
Northeastern		–		6	–	2	–	0
Bucknell		–		6	–	3	–	0
Cortland		–		6	–	3	–	0
San Diego		–		6	–	3	–	1
Arkansas–Pine Bluff		–		4	–	2	–	1
Eastern Michigan		–		6	–	4	–	0
Milwaukee		–		6	–	4	–	0
Samford		–		5	–	3	–	2
Ball State		–		5	–	4	–	1
Lake Forest		–		4	–	3	–	1
Nevada		–		6	–	5	–	0
Central Michigan		–		5	–	5	–	1
Rose-Hulman		–		5	–	5	–	0
Santa Clara		–		4	–	4	–	1
Akron		–		3	–	4	–	2
St. Norbert		–		4	–	5	–	0
Saint Mary's		–		3	–	4	–	0
Kentucky State		–		4	–	6	–	0
Drexel		–		3	–	6	–	0
Northeast Louisiana		–		3	–	7	–	0
Portland State		–		3	–	8	–	0
Wayne State (MI)		–		2	–	5	–	1
Boston University		–		2	–	8	–	0
Northern Michigan		–		2	–	8	–	0
Saint Peter's		–		2	–	8	–	0
Chattanooga		–		2	–	9	–	0
Southern Illinois		–		1	–	8	–	1
Illinois College		–		1	–	8	–	0
Eastern Illinois		–		1	–	9	–	0
Madison		–		0	–	4	–	1
UNLV		–		1	–	10	–	0
Rankings from AP small college poll

The 1972 Southern Illinois Salukis football team was an American football team that represented Southern Illinois University (now known as Southern Illinois University Carbondale) as an independent during the 1972 NCAA College Division football season. Under sixth-year head coach Dick Towers, the team compiled a 1–8–1 record. The team played its home games at McAndrew Stadium in Carbondale, Illinois.

== Schedule ==
Date	Time	Opponent	Site	Result	Attendance	Source
September 16		at East Carolina	Ficklen Memorial Stadium; Greenville, NC	L 0–16	16,509	
September 23		at Lamar	Cardinal Stadium; Beaumont, TX	L 0–7	11,300	
September 30	7:30 p.m.	at Wichita State	Cessna Stadium; Wichita, KS	L 0–12	17,046	
October 7		Dayton	McAndrew Stadium; Carbondale, IL	T 6–6	10,000	
October 14	7:05 p.m.	at Tampa	Tampa Stadium; Tampa, FL	L 0–44	14,125	
October 21		Ball State	McAndrew Stadium; Carbondale, IL	W 13–7	8,000–8,300	
October 28		Illinois State	McAndrew Stadium; Carbondale, IL	L 7–10	10,400	
November 4		at Drake	Drake Stadium; Des Moines, IA	L 9–19	10,000–12,300	
November 11		Louisville	McAndrew Stadium; Carbondale, IL	L 16–20	5,800	
November 18		Indiana State	McAndrew Stadium; Carbondale, IL	L 3–31	2,600	
All times are in Central time
