= 1972 Bridgeport Purple Knights football team =

American college football season

1972 Bridgeport Purple Knights football

Knute Rockne Bowl, W 27–22 vs. Slippery Rock
- Conference: Independent
- Record: 11–0
- Head coach: Ed Farrell (3rd season)
- Home stadium: John F. Kennedy Stadium

1972 NCAA College Division independents football records
	Conf.			Overall
Team	W	L	T	W		L		T
No. 4 Ashland		–		11	–	0	–	0
Bridgeport		–		11	–	0	–	0
No. 1 Delaware		–		10	–	0	–	0
No. 5 Tennessee State		–		11	–	1	–	0
Colorado College		–		8	–	1	–	0
Tampa		–		10	–	2	–	0
Trinity (TX)		–		8	–	2	–	0
Western Carolina		–		7	–	2	–	1
Hawaii		–		8	–	3	–	0
Indiana State		–		7	–	3	–	0
Northeastern		–		6	–	2	–	0
Bucknell		–		6	–	3	–	0
Cortland		–		6	–	3	–	0
San Diego		–		6	–	3	–	1
Arkansas–Pine Bluff		–		4	–	2	–	1
Eastern Michigan		–		6	–	4	–	0
Milwaukee		–		6	–	4	–	0
Samford		–		5	–	3	–	2
Lake Forest		–		4	–	3	–	1
Nevada		–		6	–	5	–	0
Central Michigan		–		5	–	5	–	1
Rose-Hulman		–		5	–	5	–	0
Santa Clara		–		4	–	4	–	1
Akron		–		3	–	4	–	2
St. Norbert		–		4	–	5	–	0
Saint Mary's		–		3	–	4	–	0
Kentucky State		–		4	–	6	–	0
Drexel		–		3	–	6	–	0
Northeast Louisiana		–		3	–	7	–	0
Portland State		–		3	–	8	–	0
Wayne State (MI)		–		2	–	5	–	1
Boston University		–		2	–	8	–	0
Northern Michigan		–		2	–	8	–	0
Saint Peter's		–		2	–	8	–	0
Chattanooga		–		2	–	9	–	0
Southern Illinois		–		1	–	8	–	1
Eastern Illinois		–		1	–	9	–	0
Madison		–		0	–	4	–	1
UNLV		–		1	–	10	–	0
Rankings from AP small college poll

The 1972 Bridgeport Purple Knights football team was an American football team that represented the University of Bridgeport as an independent during the 1972 NCAA College Division football season. In their third year under head coach Ed Farrell, the Purple Knights compiled a perfect 11–0 record, won the New England college division championship, defeated Slippery Rock in the Knute Rockne Bowl, and outscored all opponents by a total of 365 to 172. Bridgeport finished the 1971 season with 10 victories and extended its winning streak to 21 games during the 1972 season.

The team played its home games at John F. Kennedy Stadium in Bridgeport, Connecticut.

== Schedule ==
Date	Opponent	Site	Result	Attendance	Source
September 16	West Chester	John F. Kennedy Stadium; Bridgeport, CT	W 35–27		
September 23	American International	Kennedy Stadium; Bridgeport, CT	W 28–19		
September 30	at Northeastern	Parsons Field; Boston, MA	W 16–12	4,630	
October 7	at Central Connecticut	Arute Field; New Britain, CT	W 25–18	6,000	
October 14	Wagner	Kennedy Stadium; Bridgeport, CT	W 28–14		
October 21	Cortland	Kennedy Stadium; Bridgeport, CT	W 42–7		
October 28	at Ithaca	Ithaca, NY	W 28–7		
November 4	Southern Connecticut	Kennedy Stadium; Bridgeport, CT	W 42–10		
November 11	Lock Haven	Kennedy Stadium; Bridgeport, CT	W 52–28		
November 18	at Springfield	Athletic Field; Springfield, MA	W 42–8	1,300	
November 24	vs. Slippery Rock	Convention Hall; Atlantic City, NJ (Knute Rockne Bowl)	W 27–22	2,667	
