= Jerry Huntsman =

American football player and coach (1929–2005)

Biographical details
- Born: November 29, 1929; Mt. Pleasant, Pennsylvania, U.S.
- Died: April 5, 2005; Niceville, Florida, U.S.

Playing career
- 1948–1952: Wabash
- Position: Quarterback

Coaching career (HC unless noted)
- 1954: Waveland HS (IN) (assistant)
- 1955: Covington HS (IN) (assistant)
- 1956–1958: Crawfordsville HS (IN)
- 1959–1960: Huntington HS (IN)
- 1961–1964: Earlham
- 1965: Indiana State (backs)
- 1966–1972: Indiana State

Head coaching record
- Overall: 72–27–1 (college)

Accomplishments and honors

Awards
- 1968 NCAA District #2 Coach of the Year; 1966 NCAA District #1 Coach of the Year; 1966 Ind Collegiate Conf Coach of the Year; 1963 NAIA District Coach of the Year

James Owen "Jerry" Huntsman (November 29, 1929 – April 5, 2005) was an American football player and coach. He served as the head football coach at Earlham College (1961–1964) and Indiana State University (1966–1972), compiling a career college football record of 72–27–1.

== Playing career ==
Huntsman played football as a quarterback at Wabash College from 1948 through 1951, where he was selected ‘All-State’ in his senior season. He was also awarded with the Robert E. Vaughan Award as the college's outstanding athlete following his senior year. He graduated from Wabash College in 1952, and earned a master's degree from Purdue University.

During his U.S. Army stint; Huntsman was named to the 'All-Army' Track & Field team as a javelin thrower.

== Coaching career ==
Huntsman began his coaching career as an assistant football coach in 1954 at Waveland High School in Waveland, Indiana and then moved on to Covington High School, Covington, Indiana, leading the Trojans for the 1955 season. He served as the head basketball coach at Waveland High, leading the Hornets to a 20–4 record and the Montgomery County Tournament title. From 1956–58, he was the head coach for the Crawfordsville High Artesians in Crawfordsville, Indiana. Building a record of 14–12–2; his next stop was at Huntington High School Huntington, Indiana; his Vikings didn't lose a game during his 2 seasons; tallying a mark of 19–0–1.

Following the 1960 school year, he moved to Earlham College and spent four highly successful seasons as the head coaching job. He was also an assistant professor of physical education at Earlham. In 1965, he accepted an assistant coaching position at rapidly growing Indiana State University with the understanding that he would be named the head coach for the 1966 season.

=== College career ===
Huntsman's Quakers lost one game during his four-year tenure; racking up a record of 29–3 and building a national reputation for defense; in 1961, his Quakers defense was ranked 3rd in the nation. He left his hometown of Richmond, Indiana (home of Earlham College) with a career coaching record of 62–15–3.

In 1965, he arrived in Terre Haute as an offensive assistant (backs) and joined a staff, one season removed from an Indiana Collegiate Conference championship. His 1968 team, went 9-1, narrowly missing an invitation to the Grantland Rice Bowl. He retired from coaching in 1973, prematurely due to poor health; he accepted a position in the athletic department; he ranked 2nd in wins (43) and 1st in winning percentage (.632) at Indiana State; he is currently 3rd in wins but maintains his position as the winningest coach in 100+ seasons of Sycamore football. He also holds a 5–2 record in homecoming games.

He retired as the Associate Athletics Director in 1982; assisting the promotion of the Indiana State athletic department from Division II to Division I and helping secure admission to the Missouri Valley Conference.

Huntsman was elected president of the Indiana Intercollegiate Coaches Association in 1964.

== Family ==
Huntsman is the son of former Earlham College and Wabash College head coach J. Owen Huntsman; himself a highly successful football coach. Huntsman's brother, Stan Huntsman, was a very successful track and field coach at Ohio University, University of Tennessee, and University of Texas at Austin.

Huntsman married Cora Lee Derringer in 1955. They had three sons.

== Head coaching record ==
| Year | Team | Overall | Conference | Standing | Bowl/playoffs |
|---|---|---|---|---|---|
Earlham Quakers (NAIA independent) (1961–1964)
| 1961 | Earlham | 7–1 | | | |
| 1962 | Earlham | 8–0 | | | |
| 1963 | Earlham | 7–1 | | | |
| 1964 | Earlham | 7–1 | | | |
| Earlham: | | 29–3 | | | |
Indiana State Sycamores (Indiana Collegiate Conference) (1966–1967)
| 1966 | Indiana State | 6–2 | 4–2 | T–2nd | |
| 1967 | Indiana State | 6–4 | 4–2 | 3rd | |
Indiana State Sycamores (NCAA College Division independent) (1966–1972)
| 1968 | Indiana State | 9–1 | | | |
| 1969 | Indiana State | 6–3–1 | | | |
| 1970 | Indiana State | 5–5 | | | |
| 1971 | Indiana State | 4–6 | | | |
| 1972 | Indiana State | 7–3 | | | |
| Indiana State: | | 43–24–1 | 8–4 | | |
| Total: | | 72–27–1 | | | |
