= 1970 Southern Illinois Salukis football team =

American college football season

1970 Southern Illinois Salukis football
- Conference: Independent
- Record: 6–3
- Head coach: Dick Towers (4th season)
- Home stadium: McAndrew Stadium

1970 NCAA College Division independents football records
	Conf.			Overall
Team	W	L	T	W		L		T
No. 4 Tampa		–		10	–	1	–	0
No. 5 Tennessee State		–		10	–	0	–	0
No. 11 Delaware		–		9	–	2	–	0
Hawaii		–		9	–	2	–	0
Northern Michigan		–		8	–	2	–	0
No. 19 Eastern Michigan		–		7	–	2	–	1
Mankato State		–		7	–	2	–	1
Akron		–		7	–	3	–	0
Central Michigan		–		7	–	3	–	0
Temple		–		7	–	3	–	0
Drake		–		7	–	4	–	0
Wayne State (MI)		–		6	–	2	–	0
Arkansas AM&N		–		6	–	3	–	0
Southern Illinois		–		6	–	3	–	0
St. Norbert		–		6	–	3	–	0
Nevada		–		6	–	3	–	1
Portland State		–		6	–	4	–	0
UNLV		–		6	–	4	–	0
Boston University		–		5	–	4	–	0
Cortland		–		5	–	4	–	0
Indiana (PA)		–		5	–	4	–	0
Santa Clara		–		5	–	4	–	1
Lafayette		–		6	–	5	–	0
Colorado College		–		4	–	4	–	0
Drexel		–		4	–	4	–	0
Hofstra		–		5	–	5	–	0
Indiana State		–		5	–	5	–	0
Samford		–		5	–	5	–	0
Wabash		–		3	–	3	–	2
Saint Mary's		–		3	–	4	–	0
Ashland		–		4	–	6	–	0
Bucknell		–		4	–	6	–	0
Lehigh		–		4	–	6	–	0
Rose Poly		–		3	–	5	–	1
Illinois College		–		3	–	5	–	0
Northeastern		–		3	–	5	–	0
Indiana Central		–		3	–	6	–	0
Lake Forest		–		3	–	6	–	0
Kentucky State		–		3	–	6	–	0
Chicago		–		2	–	5	–	0
Chattanooga		–		3	–	8	–	0
Parsons		–		2	–	7	–	0
Eastern Illinois		–		2	–	8	–	0
Milwaukee		–		1	–	9	–	0
Rankings from AP small college poll

The 1970 Southern Illinois Salukis football team was an American football team that represented Southern Illinois University (now known as Southern Illinois University Carbondale) as an independent during the 1970 NCAA College Division football season. Under fourth-year head coach Dick Towers, the team compiled a 6–3 record. The team played its home games at McAndrew Stadium in Carbondale, Illinois.

== Schedule ==
Date	Time	Opponent	Site	Result	Attendance	Source
September 19	7:30 p.m.	Louisville	McAndrew Stadium; Carbondale, IL	W 31–28	7,000	
September 26		Youngstown State	McAndrew Stadium; Carbondale, IL	W 45–20	8,600	
October 3		No. 17 Lamar Tech	McAndrew Stadium; Carbondale, IL	W 32–16	10,000	
October 10		at Wichita State	Cessna Stadium; Wichita, KS	Cancelled		
October 17		at East Carolina	Ficklen Memorial Stadium; Greenville, NC	W 14–12	16,271	
October 24		Illinois State	McAndrew Stadium; Carbondale, IL	W 45–24	11,000	
October 31		Bradley	McAndrew Stadium; Carbondale, IL	W 69–3	14,000	
November 7		at Ball State	Ball State Stadium; Muncie, IN	L 17–24	10,950	
November 14		at Drake	Drake Stadium; Des Moines, IA	L 9–21	4,500	
November 21		at No. 1 Arkansas State	Kays Stadium; Jonesboro, AR	L 3–27	9,000	
Rankings from AP Poll released prior to the game; All times are in Central time
