= 1970 Eastern Michigan Hurons football team =

American college football season

1970 Eastern Michigan Hurons football
- Conference: Independent
- Record: 7–2–1
- Head coach: Dan Boisture (4th season)
- Captains: Pete Kalogeras; Mike Yankee
- Home stadium: Rynearson Stadium

1970 NCAA College Division independents football records
| | Conf. | | | Overall |
| Team | W | L | T | W | | L | | T |
|---|---|---|---|---|---|---|---|---|
| No. 4 Tampa | | – | | 10 | – | 1 | – | 0 |
| No. 5 Tennessee State | | – | | 10 | – | 0 | – | 0 |
| No. 11 Delaware | | – | | 9 | – | 2 | – | 0 |
| Hawaii | | – | | 9 | – | 2 | – | 0 |
| Northern Michigan | | – | | 8 | – | 2 | – | 0 |
| No. 19 Eastern Michigan | | – | | 7 | – | 2 | – | 1 |
| Mankato State | | – | | 7 | – | 2 | – | 1 |
| Akron | | – | | 7 | – | 3 | – | 0 |
| Central Michigan | | – | | 7 | – | 3 | – | 0 |
| Temple | | – | | 7 | – | 3 | – | 0 |
| Drake | | – | | 7 | – | 4 | – | 0 |
| Wayne State (MI) | | – | | 6 | – | 2 | – | 0 |
| Arkansas AM&N | | – | | 6 | – | 3 | – | 0 |
| Southern Illinois | | – | | 6 | – | 3 | – | 0 |
| St. Norbert | | – | | 6 | – | 3 | – | 0 |
| Nevada | | – | | 6 | – | 3 | – | 1 |
| Portland State | | – | | 6 | – | 4 | – | 0 |
| UNLV | | – | | 6 | – | 4 | – | 0 |
| Boston University | | – | | 5 | – | 4 | – | 0 |
| Cortland | | – | | 5 | – | 4 | – | 0 |
| Indiana (PA) | | – | | 5 | – | 4 | – | 0 |
| Santa Clara | | – | | 5 | – | 4 | – | 1 |
| Lafayette | | – | | 6 | – | 5 | – | 0 |
| Colorado College | | – | | 4 | – | 4 | – | 0 |
| Drexel | | – | | 4 | – | 4 | – | 0 |
| Hofstra | | – | | 5 | – | 5 | – | 0 |
| Indiana State | | – | | 5 | – | 5 | – | 0 |
| Samford | | – | | 5 | – | 5 | – | 0 |
| Wabash | | – | | 3 | – | 3 | – | 2 |
| Saint Mary's | | – | | 3 | – | 4 | – | 0 |
| Ashland | | – | | 4 | – | 6 | – | 0 |
| Bucknell | | – | | 4 | – | 6 | – | 0 |
| Lehigh | | – | | 4 | – | 6 | – | 0 |
| Rose Poly | | – | | 3 | – | 5 | – | 1 |
| Illinois College | | – | | 3 | – | 5 | – | 0 |
| Northeastern | | – | | 3 | – | 5 | – | 0 |
| Indiana Central | | – | | 3 | – | 6 | – | 0 |
| Lake Forest | | – | | 3 | – | 6 | – | 0 |
| Kentucky State | | – | | 3 | – | 6 | – | 0 |
| Chicago | | – | | 2 | – | 5 | – | 0 |
| Chattanooga | | – | | 3 | – | 8 | – | 0 |
| Parsons | | – | | 2 | – | 7 | – | 0 |
| Eastern Illinois | | – | | 2 | – | 8 | – | 0 |
| Milwaukee | | – | | 1 | – | 9 | – | 0 |
Rankings from AP small college poll

The 1970 Eastern Michigan Hurons football team represented Eastern Michigan University as an independent during the 1970 NCAA College Division football season. In their fourth season under head coach Dan Boisture, the Hurons compiled a 7–2–1 record and outscored their opponents, 237 to 109. On November 14, 1970, the Hurons won the final game of their season, 60–0, over Ball State, as running back Larry Ratcliff scored four touchdowns and rushed for 212 yards in his final college game.

Defensive tackle Dave Pureifory received second-team honors on the 1970 Little All-America college football team.

== Schedule ==
| Date | Opponent | Rank | Site | Result | Attendance | Source |
|---|---|---|---|---|---|---|
| September 12 | at North Dakota State | | Dacotah Field; Fargo, ND | T 14–14 | 10,500 | |
| September 19 | at Quantico Marines | | Quantico, VA | W 23–0 | 6,800 | |
| September 26 | Waynesburg | No. 7 | Rynearson Stadium; Ypsilanti, MI | W 30–0 | 10,500 | |
| October 3 | Indiana State^{†} | No. 6 | Rynearson Stadium; Ypsilanti, MI | W 25–21 | 6,100–12,400 | |
| October 10 | at No. 10 Western Kentucky | No. 7 | L. T. Smith Stadium; Bowling Green, KY | L 6–45 | 19,500 | |
| October 17 | at Eastern Kentucky | No. 18 | Roy Kidd Stadium; Richmond, KY | L 10–21 | 7,000 | |
| October 24 | Milwaukee | | Rynearson Stadium; Ypsilanti, MI | W 35–0 | 3,500 | |
| October 31 | at Northern Michigan | | Marquette, MI | W 14–8 | 8,000 | |
| November 7 | Northeast Louisiana | | Rynearson Stadium; Ypsilanti, MI | W 20–0 | 6,800 | |
| November 14 | Ball State | | Rynearson Stadium; Ypsilanti, MI | W 60–0 | 1,500–2,300 | |
^{†}Homecoming; Rankings from AP Poll released prior to the game

== After the season ==
The following Huron was selected in the 1971 NFL draft after the season.

| Round | Pick | Player | Position | NFL club |
|---|---|---|---|---|
| 3 | 72 | Al Clark | Defensive back | Detroit Lions |
