= 1962 Earlham Quakers football team =

American college football season

1962 Earlham Quakers football
- Conference: Independent
- Record: 8–0
- Head coach: Jerry Huntsman (2nd season)

1962 NAIA independents football records
	Conf.			Overall
Team	W	L	T	W		L		T
Earlham		–		8	–	0	–	0
La Verne		–		6	–	2	–	0
Eastern New Mexico		–		7	–	3	–	0
Georgetown (KY)		–		5	–	3	–	0
Hillsdale		–		5	–	3	–	1
McMurry		–		6	–	4	–	0
Austin		–		5	–	4	–	0
Findlay		–		4	–	5	–	1
Cal Lutheran		–		3	–	4	–	0
Oklahoma Panhandle State		–		3	–	6	–	1
St. Mary of the Plains		–		1	–	8	–	0

The 1962 Earlham Quakers football team was an American football team that represented Earlham College of Richmond, Indiana, as an independent team during the 1962 NAIA football season. In their second season under head coach Jerry Huntsman, the Quakers compiled a perfect 8–0 record, shut out five of eight opponents, and outscored all opponents by a total of 233 to 26. The season was part of a 24-game winning streak that included consecutive perfect seasons in 1961 and 1962. The Quakers were also the only unbeaten and untied team in Indiana during the 1962 college football season.

The team's statistical leaders included sophomore quarterback Rick Carter with 621 yards of total offense (527 passing yards, 94 rushing yards), junior halfback-fullback Steve Boyce with 489 rushing yards and 60 points scored, and senior halfback Jerry Dusseau rushed for an average of 6.6 yards per carry.

== Schedule ==
Date	Opponent	Site	Result	Attendance	Source
September 22	Principia	Richmond, IN	W 20–0		
September 29	Taylor	Richmond, IN	W 13–7		
October 6	at Elmhust	Elmhust, IL	W 32–0		
October 13	Franklin (IN)	Franklin, IN	W 31–13		
October 20	at Manchester (IN)	North Manchester, IN	W 26–0		
October 27	Rose Polytechnic	Richmond, IN	W 60–6		
November 3	Wilmington (OH)	Richmond, IN	W 27–0		
November 10	at Indiana Central	Indianapolis, IN	W 24–0		
