= 1970 Indiana State Sycamores football team =

American college football season

1970 Indiana State Sycamores football
- Conference: Independent
- Record: 5–5
- Head coach: Jerry Huntsman (4th season)
- Home stadium: Memorial Stadium

1970 NCAA College Division independents football records
	Conf.			Overall
Team	W	L	T	W		L		T
No. 4 Tampa		–		10	–	1	–	0
No. 5 Tennessee State		–		10	–	0	–	0
No. 11 Delaware		–		9	–	2	–	0
Hawaii		–		9	–	2	–	0
Northern Michigan		–		8	–	2	–	0
No. 19 Eastern Michigan		–		7	–	2	–	1
Mankato State		–		7	–	2	–	1
Akron		–		7	–	3	–	0
Central Michigan		–		7	–	3	–	0
Temple		–		7	–	3	–	0
Drake		–		7	–	4	–	0
Wayne State (MI)		–		6	–	2	–	0
Arkansas AM&N		–		6	–	3	–	0
Southern Illinois		–		6	–	3	–	0
St. Norbert		–		6	–	3	–	0
Nevada		–		6	–	3	–	1
Portland State		–		6	–	4	–	0
UNLV		–		6	–	4	–	0
Boston University		–		5	–	4	–	0
Cortland		–		5	–	4	–	0
Indiana (PA)		–		5	–	4	–	0
Santa Clara		–		5	–	4	–	1
Lafayette		–		6	–	5	–	0
Colorado College		–		4	–	4	–	0
Drexel		–		4	–	4	–	0
Hofstra		–		5	–	5	–	0
Indiana State		–		5	–	5	–	0
Samford		–		5	–	5	–	0
Wabash		–		3	–	3	–	2
Saint Mary's		–		3	–	4	–	0
Ashland		–		4	–	6	–	0
Bucknell		–		4	–	6	–	0
Lehigh		–		4	–	6	–	0
Rose Poly		–		3	–	5	–	1
Northeastern		–		3	–	5	–	0
Indiana Central		–		3	–	6	–	0
Lake Forest		–		3	–	6	–	0
Kentucky State		–		3	–	6	–	0
Chicago		–		2	–	5	–	0
Chattanooga		–		3	–	8	–	0
Parsons		–		2	–	7	–	0
Eastern Illinois		–		2	–	8	–	0
Milwaukee		–		1	–	9	–	0
Rankings from AP small college poll

The 1970 Indiana State Sycamores football team represented Indiana State University as an independent during the 1970 NCAA College Division football season. Led by fourth-year head coach Jerry Huntsman, the Sycamores compiled a record of 5–5.

== Schedule ==
Date	Opponent	Site	Result	Attendance	Source
September 12	at Eastern Illinois	O'Brien Stadium; Charleston, IL	W 28–18	6,000–10,000	
September 19	Western Kentucky	Memorial Stadium; Terre Haute, IN	L 6–30	13,500–14,208	
September 26	Evansville	Memorial Stadium; Terre Haute, IN	W 20–7	6,423	
October 3	No. 6 Eastern Michigan	Rynearson Stadium; Ypsilanti, MI	L 21–25	6,100–12,400	
October 10	Ball State^{†}	Memorial Stadium; Terre Haute, IN	L 26–28	16,717–18,500	
October 17	at No. 10 Akron	Rubber Bowl; Akron, OH	W 17–8	8,752–12,111	
October 24	Butler	Memorial Stadium; Terre Haute, IN	W 61–0	6,102	
October 31	at Illinois State	Hancock Stadium; Normal, IL	W 28–7	21,500	
November 7	at Central Michigan	Alumni Field; Mount Pleasant, MI	L 7–17	7,200	
November 14	No. 10 Eastern Kentucky	Memorial Stadium; Terre Haute, IN	L 0–9	2,510	
^{†}Homecoming; Rankings from AP Poll released prior to the game
