= 1970 Akron Zips football team =

American college football season

1970 Akron Zips football
- Conference: Independent
- Record: 7–3
- Head coach: Gordon K. Larson (10th season)
- Captain: Fred DeHart; Jack Beidleman; Rod Lemon; Joe Zwisler
- Home stadium: Rubber Bowl

1970 NCAA College Division independents football records
	Conf.			Overall
Team	W	L	T	W		L		T
No. 4 Tampa		–		10	–	1	–	0
No. 5 Tennessee State		–		10	–	0	–	0
No. 11 Delaware		–		9	–	2	–	0
Hawaii		–		9	–	2	–	0
Northern Michigan		–		8	–	2	–	0
No. 19 Eastern Michigan		–		7	–	2	–	1
Mankato State		–		7	–	2	–	1
Akron		–		7	–	3	–	0
Central Michigan		–		7	–	3	–	0
Temple		–		7	–	3	–	0
Drake		–		7	–	4	–	0
Wayne State (MI)		–		6	–	2	–	0
Arkansas AM&N		–		6	–	3	–	0
Southern Illinois		–		6	–	3	–	0
St. Norbert		–		6	–	3	–	0
Nevada		–		6	–	3	–	1
Portland State		–		6	–	4	–	0
UNLV		–		6	–	4	–	0
Boston University		–		5	–	4	–	0
Cortland		–		5	–	4	–	0
Indiana (PA)		–		5	–	4	–	0
Santa Clara		–		5	–	4	–	1
Lafayette		–		6	–	5	–	0
Colorado College		–		4	–	4	–	0
Drexel		–		4	–	4	–	0
Hofstra		–		5	–	5	–	0
Indiana State		–		5	–	5	–	0
Samford		–		5	–	5	–	0
Wabash		–		3	–	3	–	2
Saint Mary's		–		3	–	4	–	0
Ashland		–		4	–	6	–	0
Bucknell		–		4	–	6	–	0
Lehigh		–		4	–	6	–	0
Rose Poly		–		3	–	5	–	1
Illinois College		–		3	–	5	–	0
Northeastern		–		3	–	5	–	0
Indiana Central		–		3	–	6	–	0
Lake Forest		–		3	–	6	–	0
Kentucky State		–		3	–	6	–	0
Chicago		–		2	–	5	–	0
Chattanooga		–		3	–	8	–	0
Parsons		–		2	–	7	–	0
Eastern Illinois		–		2	–	8	–	0
Milwaukee		–		1	–	9	–	0
Rankings from AP small college poll

The 1970 Akron Zips football team represented Akron University in the 1970 NCAA College Division football season as an independent. Led by 10th-year head coach Gordon K. Larson, the Zips played their home games at the Rubber Bowl in Akron, Ohio. They finished the season with a record of 7–3 and outscored their opponents 259–92.

== Schedule ==
Date	Opponent	Rank	Site	Result	Attendance	Source
September 12	at Temple		Temple Stadium; Philadelphia, PA	W 21–0	8,450–10,000	
September 19	Butler		Rubber Bowl; Akron, OH	W 34–0	41,670	
September 26	Northern Michigan	No. 3	Rubber Bowl; Akron, OH	W 19–6	14,474	
October 3	at Ball State	No. 2	Ball State Stadium; Muncie, IN	W 31–0	8,305	
October 10	at Illinois State	No. 3	Hancock Stadium; Normal, IL	L 14–15	15,500	
October 17	Indiana State	No. 10	Rubber Bowl; Akron, OH	L 8–17	8,752–12,111	
October 24	Dayton		Rubber Bowl; Akron, OH	L 6–14	15,230	
October 31	Central Michigan		Rubber Bowl; Akron, OH	W 35–19	6,000–6,023	
November 7	at Youngstown State		Rayen Stadium; Youngstown, OH (Steel Tire)	W 42–14	5,000	
November 14	at IUP		Indiana, PA	W 49–7	4,500	
Rankings from AP Poll released prior to the game
