= 1970 Central Michigan Chippewas football team =

American college football season

1970 Central Michigan Chippewas football
- Conference: Independent
- Record: 7–3
- Head coach: Roy Kramer (4th season)
- Defensive coordinator: Herb Deromedi (2nd season)
- MVP: Jesse Lakes
- Home stadium: Alumni Field

1970 NCAA College Division independents football records
	Conf.			Overall
Team	W	L	T	W		L		T
No. 4 Tampa		–		10	–	1	–	0
No. 5 Tennessee State		–		10	–	0	–	0
No. 11 Delaware		–		9	–	2	–	0
Hawaii		–		9	–	2	–	0
Northern Michigan		–		8	–	2	–	0
No. 19 Eastern Michigan		–		7	–	2	–	1
Mankato State		–		7	–	2	–	1
Akron		–		7	–	3	–	0
Central Michigan		–		7	–	3	–	0
Temple		–		7	–	3	–	0
Drake		–		7	–	4	–	0
Wayne State (MI)		–		6	–	2	–	0
Arkansas AM&N		–		6	–	3	–	0
Southern Illinois		–		6	–	3	–	0
St. Norbert		–		6	–	3	–	0
Nevada		–		6	–	3	–	1
Portland State		–		6	–	4	–	0
UNLV		–		6	–	4	–	0
Boston University		–		5	–	4	–	0
Cortland		–		5	–	4	–	0
Indiana (PA)		–		5	–	4	–	0
Santa Clara		–		5	–	4	–	1
Lafayette		–		6	–	5	–	0
Colorado College		–		4	–	4	–	0
Drexel		–		4	–	4	–	0
Hofstra		–		5	–	5	–	0
Indiana State		–		5	–	5	–	0
Samford		–		5	–	5	–	0
Wabash		–		3	–	3	–	2
Saint Mary's		–		3	–	4	–	0
Ashland		–		4	–	6	–	0
Bucknell		–		4	–	6	–	0
Lehigh		–		4	–	6	–	0
Rose Poly		–		3	–	5	–	1
Illinois College		–		3	–	5	–	0
Northeastern		–		3	–	5	–	0
Indiana Central		–		3	–	6	–	0
Lake Forest		–		3	–	6	–	0
Kentucky State		–		3	–	6	–	0
Chicago		–		2	–	5	–	0
Chattanooga		–		3	–	8	–	0
Parsons		–		2	–	7	–	0
Eastern Illinois		–		2	–	8	–	0
Milwaukee		–		1	–	9	–	0
Rankings from AP small college poll

The 1970 Central Michigan Chippewas football team represented Central Michigan University as an independent during the 1970 NCAA College Division football season. In their fourth season under head coach Roy Kramer, the Chippewas compiled a 7–3 record and outscored their opponents, 263 to 190. The team's statistical leaders included quarterback Mick Brzezinski with 775 passing yards, tailback Jesse Lakes with 1,296 rushing yards, and Rick Groth with 451 receiving yards. Lakes received the team's most valuable player award for the first of two consecutive years.

== Schedule ==
Date	Opponent	Site	Result	Attendance	Source
September 12	Western Michigan	Alumni Field; Mount Pleasant, MI (rivalry)	L 0–41	13,500	
September 19	Northern Iowa	Alumni Field; Mount Pleasant, MI	W 27–9	9,000	
September 26	at Milwaukee	Milwaukee County Stadium; Milwaukee, WI	W 27–0	5,000	
October 3	Illinois State	Alumni Field; Mount Pleasant, MI	W 34–20	8,500	
October 10	at Northern Michigan	Marquette, MI	L 14–34	7,500	
October 17	Western Illinois^{†}	Alumni Field; Mount Pleasant, MI	W 20–10	13,000	
October 24	at Eastern Illinois	O'Brien Field; Charleston, IL	W 58–34	3,000	
October 31	at Akron	Rubber Bowl; Akron, OH	L 19–35	6,000–6,023	
November 7	Indiana State	Alumni Field; Mount Pleasant, MI	W 17–7	7,200	
November 14	at Hofstra	James M. Shuart Stadium; Hempstead, NY	W 47–0	2,500	
^{†}Homecoming
