= 1970 Eastern Illinois Panthers football team =

American college football season

1970 Eastern Illinois Panthers football
- Conference: Independent
- Record: 2–8
- Head coach: Clyde Biggers (6th season)
- Home stadium: O'Brien Stadium

1970 NCAA College Division independents football records
| | Conf. | | | Overall |
| Team | W | L | T | W | | L | | T |
|---|---|---|---|---|---|---|---|---|
| No. 4 Tampa | | – | | 10 | – | 1 | – | 0 |
| No. 5 Tennessee State | | – | | 10 | – | 0 | – | 0 |
| No. 11 Delaware | | – | | 9 | – | 2 | – | 0 |
| Hawaii | | – | | 9 | – | 2 | – | 0 |
| Northern Michigan | | – | | 8 | – | 2 | – | 0 |
| No. 19 Eastern Michigan | | – | | 7 | – | 2 | – | 1 |
| Mankato State | | – | | 7 | – | 2 | – | 1 |
| Akron | | – | | 7 | – | 3 | – | 0 |
| Central Michigan | | – | | 7 | – | 3 | – | 0 |
| Temple | | – | | 7 | – | 3 | – | 0 |
| Drake | | – | | 7 | – | 4 | – | 0 |
| Wayne State (MI) | | – | | 6 | – | 2 | – | 0 |
| Arkansas AM&N | | – | | 6 | – | 3 | – | 0 |
| Southern Illinois | | – | | 6 | – | 3 | – | 0 |
| St. Norbert | | – | | 6 | – | 3 | – | 0 |
| Nevada | | – | | 6 | – | 3 | – | 1 |
| Portland State | | – | | 6 | – | 4 | – | 0 |
| UNLV | | – | | 6 | – | 4 | – | 0 |
| Boston University | | – | | 5 | – | 4 | – | 0 |
| Cortland | | – | | 5 | – | 4 | – | 0 |
| Indiana (PA) | | – | | 5 | – | 4 | – | 0 |
| Santa Clara | | – | | 5 | – | 4 | – | 1 |
| Lafayette | | – | | 6 | – | 5 | – | 0 |
| Colorado College | | – | | 4 | – | 4 | – | 0 |
| Drexel | | – | | 4 | – | 4 | – | 0 |
| Hofstra | | – | | 5 | – | 5 | – | 0 |
| Indiana State | | – | | 5 | – | 5 | – | 0 |
| Samford | | – | | 5 | – | 5 | – | 0 |
| Wabash | | – | | 3 | – | 3 | – | 2 |
| Saint Mary's | | – | | 3 | – | 4 | – | 0 |
| Ashland | | – | | 4 | – | 6 | – | 0 |
| Bucknell | | – | | 4 | – | 6 | – | 0 |
| Lehigh | | – | | 4 | – | 6 | – | 0 |
| Rose Poly | | – | | 3 | – | 5 | – | 1 |
| Illinois College | | – | | 3 | – | 5 | – | 0 |
| Northeastern | | – | | 3 | – | 5 | – | 0 |
| Indiana Central | | – | | 3 | – | 6 | – | 0 |
| Lake Forest | | – | | 3 | – | 6 | – | 0 |
| Kentucky State | | – | | 3 | – | 6 | – | 0 |
| Chicago | | – | | 2 | – | 5 | – | 0 |
| Chattanooga | | – | | 3 | – | 8 | – | 0 |
| Parsons | | – | | 2 | – | 7 | – | 0 |
| Eastern Illinois | | – | | 2 | – | 8 | – | 0 |
| Milwaukee | | – | | 1 | – | 9 | – | 0 |
Rankings from AP small college poll

The 1970 Eastern Illinois Panthers football team represented Eastern Illinois University as an independent during the 1970 NCAA College Division football season. The Panthers played their home games at O'Brien Stadium in Charleston, Illinois. Led by sixth-year head coach Clyde Biggers, they compiled a 2–8 record.

== Schedule ==
| Date | Time | Opponent | Site | Result | Attendance | Source |
|---|---|---|---|---|---|---|
| September 12 | | Indiana State | O'Brien Stadium; Charleston, IL | L 18–28 | 6,000–10,000 | |
| September 19 | | Milwaukee | O'Brien Stadium; Charleston, IL | W 19–14 | 7,500 | |
| September 26 | | at Chicago Circle | Soldier Field; Chicago, IL | W 20–6 | 500 | |
| October 3 | 2:00 p.m. | at No. 16 Central Missouri State | Vernon Kennedy Field; Warrensburg, MO | L 17–27 | 7,000 | |
| October 10 | | Northeast Missouri State | O'Brien Stadium; Charleston, IL | L 14–28 | 4,500 | |
| October 17 | | Illinois State | O'Brien Stadium; Charleston, IL (rivalry) | L 20–29 | 9,200 | |
| October 24 | | Central Michigan | O'Brien Stadium; Charleston, IL | L 34–58 | 3,000 | |
| October 31 | | at Western Illinois | Hanson Field; Macomb, IL | L 14–31 | 10,000 | |
| November 7 | | at Northern Michigan | Marquette, MI | L 22–35 | 4,500 | |
| November 14 | | at Fairmont State | Fairmont, WV | L 12–35 | 1,000 | |
Rankings from AP Poll released prior to the game; All times are in Central time
