= 1970 Temple Owls football team =

American college football season

1970 Temple Owls football
- Conference: Independent
- Record: 7–3
- Head coach: Wayne Hardin (1st season)
- Home stadium: Temple Stadium

1970 NCAA College Division independents football records
	Conf.			Overall
Team	W	L	T	W		L		T
No. 4 Tampa		–		10	–	1	–	0
No. 5 Tennessee State		–		10	–	0	–	0
No. 11 Delaware		–		9	–	2	–	0
Hawaii		–		9	–	2	–	0
Northern Michigan		–		8	–	2	–	0
No. 19 Eastern Michigan		–		7	–	2	–	1
Mankato State		–		7	–	2	–	1
Akron		–		7	–	3	–	0
Central Michigan		–		7	–	3	–	0
Temple		–		7	–	3	–	0
Drake		–		7	–	4	–	0
Wayne State (MI)		–		6	–	2	–	0
Arkansas AM&N		–		6	–	3	–	0
Southern Illinois		–		6	–	3	–	0
St. Norbert		–		6	–	3	–	0
Nevada		–		6	–	3	–	1
Portland State		–		6	–	4	–	0
UNLV		–		6	–	4	–	0
Boston University		–		5	–	4	–	0
Cortland		–		5	–	4	–	0
Indiana (PA)		–		5	–	4	–	0
Santa Clara		–		5	–	4	–	1
Lafayette		–		6	–	5	–	0
Colorado College		–		4	–	4	–	0
Drexel		–		4	–	4	–	0
Hofstra		–		5	–	5	–	0
Indiana State		–		5	–	5	–	0
Samford		–		5	–	5	–	0
Wabash		–		3	–	3	–	2
Saint Mary's		–		3	–	4	–	0
Ashland		–		4	–	6	–	0
Bucknell		–		4	–	6	–	0
Lehigh		–		4	–	6	–	0
Rose Poly		–		3	–	5	–	1
Illinois College		–		3	–	5	–	0
Northeastern		–		3	–	5	–	0
Indiana Central		–		3	–	6	–	0
Lake Forest		–		3	–	6	–	0
Kentucky State		–		3	–	6	–	0
Chicago		–		2	–	5	–	0
Chattanooga		–		3	–	8	–	0
Parsons		–		2	–	7	–	0
Eastern Illinois		–		2	–	8	–	0
Milwaukee		–		1	–	9	–	0
Rankings from AP small college poll

The 1970 Temple Owls football team was an American football team that represented Temple University as an independent during the 1970 NCAA College Division football season. In its first season under head coach Wayne Hardin, the team compiled a 7–3 record. The team played its home games at Temple Stadium in Philadelphia.

== Schedule ==
Date	Time	Opponent	Site	Result	Attendance	Source
September 12		Akron	Temple Stadium; Philadelphia, PA	L 0–21	8,450–10,000	
September 19		at Bucknell	Memorial Stadium; Lewisburg, PA	W 10–3	4,850–5,000	
September 26		at Holy Cross	Fitton Field; Worcester, MA	W 23–13	12,500	
October 3		at Boston University	Nickerson Field; Boston, MA	W 10–7	5,300–5,353	
October 10		Connecticut	Temple Stadium; Philadelphia, PA	W 41–23	8,126–8,500	
October 17	2:00 p.m.	at Xavier	Corcoran Stadium; Cincinnati, OH	W 28–15	6,851	
October 31		No. 7 Delaware	Temple Stadium; Philadelphia, PA	L 13–15	13,116–14,000	
November 7		Rhode Island	Temple Stadium; Philadelphia, PA	W 18–15	7,979–11,000	
November 14		Buffalo	Temple Stadium; Philadelphia, PA	W 21–8	5,000–5,719	
November 26		Villanova	Temple Stadium; Philadelphia, PA (Mayor's Cup)	L 26–31	15,233	
Rankings from AP Poll released prior to the game; All times are in Eastern time

== Roster ==
1970 Temple Owls football team roster
Players			Coaches
Offense: Pos. / # / Name / Class; G / 64 / Bill Singletary / So	Defense: Pos. / # / Name / Class	Special teams: Pos. / # / Name / Class; K / 1 / Nick Mike-Mayer / So	Head coach: Wayne Hardin; Coordinators/assistant coaches Legend: (C) Team captain; (S) Suspended; (I) Ineligible; Injured; Redshirt
