= 1970 UNLV Rebels football team =

American college football season

1970 UNLV Rebels football
- Conference: Independent
- Record: 6–4
- Head coach: Bill Ireland (3rd season)
- Home stadium: Butcher Field

1970 NCAA College Division independents football records
	Conf.			Overall
Team	W	L	T	W		L		T
No. 4 Tampa		–		10	–	1	–	0
No. 5 Tennessee State		–		10	–	0	–	0
No. 11 Delaware		–		9	–	2	–	0
Hawaii		–		9	–	2	–	0
Northern Michigan		–		8	–	2	–	0
No. 19 Eastern Michigan		–		7	–	2	–	1
Mankato State		–		7	–	2	–	1
Akron		–		7	–	3	–	0
Central Michigan		–		7	–	3	–	0
Temple		–		7	–	3	–	0
Drake		–		7	–	4	–	0
Wayne State (MI)		–		6	–	2	–	0
Arkansas AM&N		–		6	–	3	–	0
Southern Illinois		–		6	–	3	–	0
St. Norbert		–		6	–	3	–	0
Nevada		–		6	–	3	–	1
Portland State		–		6	–	4	–	0
UNLV		–		6	–	4	–	0
Boston University		–		5	–	4	–	0
Cortland		–		5	–	4	–	0
Indiana (PA)		–		5	–	4	–	0
Santa Clara		–		5	–	4	–	1
Lafayette		–		6	–	5	–	0
Colorado College		–		4	–	4	–	0
Drexel		–		4	–	4	–	0
Hofstra		–		5	–	5	–	0
Indiana State		–		5	–	5	–	0
Samford		–		5	–	5	–	0
Wabash		–		3	–	3	–	2
Saint Mary's		–		3	–	4	–	0
Ashland		–		4	–	6	–	0
Bucknell		–		4	–	6	–	0
Lehigh		–		4	–	6	–	0
Rose Poly		–		3	–	5	–	1
Northeastern		–		3	–	5	–	0
Indiana Central		–		3	–	6	–	0
Lake Forest		–		3	–	6	–	0
Kentucky State		–		3	–	6	–	0
Chicago		–		2	–	5	–	0
Chattanooga		–		3	–	8	–	0
Parsons		–		2	–	7	–	0
Eastern Illinois		–		2	–	8	–	0
Milwaukee		–		1	–	9	–	0
Rankings from AP small college poll

The 1970 UNLV Rebels football team was an American football team that represented the University of Nevada, Las Vegas as an independent during the 1970 NCAA College Division football season. In their third year under head coach Bill Ireland, the team compiled a record of 6–4.

== Schedule ==
Date	Opponent	Site	Result	Attendance	Source
September 19	Southern Utah	Butcher Field; Las Vegas, NV	W 28–6	6,000	
September 26	at Idaho State	ASISU Minidome; Pocatello, ID	L 34–64	10,400	
October 3	Oregon Tech	Butcher Field; Las Vegas, NV	W 56–0	5,600	
October 10	at UC Riverside	Highlander Stadium; Riverside, CA	L 19–21	2,000–2,500	
October 17	Cal State Los Angeles	Butcher Field; Las Vegas, NV	L 20–21	2,000–3,000	
October 22	at Cal State Fullerton	Anaheim Stadium; Anaheim, CA	W 20–10	5,300	
October 31	at Santa Clara	Buck Shaw Stadium; Santa Clara, CA	W 35–25	8,124	
November 7	Hawaii	Butcher Field; Las Vegas, NV	L 21–28	5,002	
November 14	Montana State	Butcher Field; Las Vegas, NV	W 38–36	2,700–3,000	
November 26	Nevada	Butcher Field; Las Vegas, NV (Fremont Cannon)	W 42–30	6,000	
