= 1970 Lafayette Leopards football team =

American college football season

1970 Lafayette Leopards football
- Conference: Independent
- Record: 6–5
- Head coach: Harry Gamble (4th season)
- Captain: Richard McKay
- Home stadium: Fisher Field

1970 NCAA College Division independents football records
	Conf.			Overall
Team	W	L	T	W		L		T
No. 4 Tampa		–		10	–	1	–	0
No. 5 Tennessee State		–		10	–	0	–	0
No. 11 Delaware		–		9	–	2	–	0
Hawaii		–		9	–	2	–	0
Northern Michigan		–		8	–	2	–	0
No. 19 Eastern Michigan		–		7	–	2	–	1
Mankato State		–		7	–	2	–	1
Akron		–		7	–	3	–	0
Central Michigan		–		7	–	3	–	0
Temple		–		7	–	3	–	0
Drake		–		7	–	4	–	0
Wayne State (MI)		–		6	–	2	–	0
Arkansas AM&N		–		6	–	3	–	0
Southern Illinois		–		6	–	3	–	0
St. Norbert		–		6	–	3	–	0
Nevada		–		6	–	3	–	1
Portland State		–		6	–	4	–	0
UNLV		–		6	–	4	–	0
Boston University		–		5	–	4	–	0
Cortland		–		5	–	4	–	0
Indiana (PA)		–		5	–	4	–	0
Santa Clara		–		5	–	4	–	1
Lafayette		–		6	–	5	–	0
Colorado College		–		4	–	4	–	0
Drexel		–		4	–	4	–	0
Hofstra		–		5	–	5	–	0
Indiana State		–		5	–	5	–	0
Samford		–		5	–	5	–	0
Wabash		–		3	–	3	–	2
Saint Mary's		–		3	–	4	–	0
Ashland		–		4	–	6	–	0
Bucknell		–		4	–	6	–	0
Lehigh		–		4	–	6	–	0
Rose Poly		–		3	–	5	–	1
Northeastern		–		3	–	5	–	0
Indiana Central		–		3	–	6	–	0
Lake Forest		–		3	–	6	–	0
Kentucky State		–		3	–	6	–	0
Chicago		–		2	–	5	–	0
Chattanooga		–		3	–	8	–	0
Parsons		–		2	–	7	–	0
Eastern Illinois		–		2	–	8	–	0
Milwaukee		–		1	–	9	–	0
Rankings from AP small college poll

The 1970 Lafayette Leopards football team was an American football team that represented Lafayette College as an independent during the 1970 NCAA College Division football season. In their fourth and final year under head coach Harry Gamble, the Leopards compiled a 6–5 record. Richard McKay was the team captain.

Following the decision by the Middle Atlantic Conference to end football competition in its University Division, the Leopards competed as a football independent in 1970, though five of the former league rivals (Bucknell, Delaware, Gettysburg, Lafayette and Lehigh) continued to play an informal round-robin called the "Middle Five". The three-way rivalry with Lehigh and Rutgers remained on Lafayette's football schedule, but press reports in 1970 make no mention of a Middle Three Conference champion.

Lafayette played its home games at Fisher Field on College Hill in Easton, Pennsylvania.

== Schedule ==
Date	Opponent	Site	Result	Attendance	Source
September 12	East Stroudsburg	Fisher Field; Easton, PA	W 27–16	7,000–9,500	
September 19	at Rutgers	Rutgers Stadium; Piscataway, NJ	L 16–41	13,000	
September 26	at Columbia	Baker Field; New York, NY	L 9–23	5,079	
October 3	Drexel	Fisher Field; Easton, PA	W 19–14	6,500	
October 10	at No. 11 Delaware	Delaware Stadium; Newark, DE	L 20–36	17,116	
October 17	at Penn	Franklin Field; Philadelphia, PA	L 20–31	7,913–7,933	
October 24	at Bucknell	Memorial Stadium; Lewisburg, PA	L 28–30	10,000–10,115	
October 31	Gettysburg^{†}	Fisher Field; Easton, PA	W 21–14	8,200–8,500	
November 7	at Davidson	Richardson Stadium; Davidson, NC	W 53–34	4,500	
November 14	Vermont	Fisher Field; Easton, PA	W 31–14	4,000–6,000	
November 21	Lehigh	Fisher Field; Easton, PA (The Rivalry)	W 31–28	17,000	
^{†}Homecoming; Rankings from AP Poll released prior to the game
