= 1970 Lehigh Engineers football team =

American college football season

1970 Lehigh Engineers football
- Conference: Independent
- Record: 4–6
- Head coach: Fred Dunlap (6th season)
- Offensive coordinator: John Whitehead (2nd season)
- Captains: Thad Jamula; Geo Nicholson
- Home stadium: Taylor Stadium

1970 NCAA College Division independents football records
	Conf.			Overall
Team	W	L	T	W		L		T
No. 4 Tampa		–		10	–	1	–	0
No. 5 Tennessee State		–		10	–	0	–	0
No. 11 Delaware		–		9	–	2	–	0
Hawaii		–		9	–	2	–	0
Northern Michigan		–		8	–	2	–	0
No. 19 Eastern Michigan		–		7	–	2	–	1
Mankato State		–		7	–	2	–	1
Akron		–		7	–	3	–	0
Central Michigan		–		7	–	3	–	0
Temple		–		7	–	3	–	0
Drake		–		7	–	4	–	0
Wayne State (MI)		–		6	–	2	–	0
Arkansas AM&N		–		6	–	3	–	0
Southern Illinois		–		6	–	3	–	0
St. Norbert		–		6	–	3	–	0
Nevada		–		6	–	3	–	1
Portland State		–		6	–	4	–	0
UNLV		–		6	–	4	–	0
Boston University		–		5	–	4	–	0
Cortland		–		5	–	4	–	0
Indiana (PA)		–		5	–	4	–	0
Santa Clara		–		5	–	4	–	1
Lafayette		–		6	–	5	–	0
Colorado College		–		4	–	4	–	0
Drexel		–		4	–	4	–	0
Hofstra		–		5	–	5	–	0
Indiana State		–		5	–	5	–	0
Samford		–		5	–	5	–	0
Wabash		–		3	–	3	–	2
Saint Mary's		–		3	–	4	–	0
Ashland		–		4	–	6	–	0
Bucknell		–		4	–	6	–	0
Lehigh		–		4	–	6	–	0
Rose Poly		–		3	–	5	–	1
Northeastern		–		3	–	5	–	0
Indiana Central		–		3	–	6	–	0
Lake Forest		–		3	–	6	–	0
Kentucky State		–		3	–	6	–	0
Chicago		–		2	–	5	–	0
Chattanooga		–		3	–	8	–	0
Parsons		–		2	–	7	–	0
Eastern Illinois		–		2	–	8	–	0
Milwaukee		–		1	–	9	–	0
Rankings from AP small college poll

The 1970 Lehigh Engineers football team was an American football team that represented Lehigh University as an independent during the 1970 NCAA College Division football season.

In their sixth year under head coach Fred Dunlap, the Engineers compiled a 4–6 record. Thad Jamula and Geo Nicholson were the team captains.

Following the decision by the Middle Atlantic Conference to end football competition in its University Division, the Engineers competed as a football independent in 1970, though five of the former league rivals (Bucknell, Delaware, Gettysburg, Lafayette and Lehigh) continued to play an informal round-robin called the "Middle Five".

The three-way rivalry with Lafayette and Rutgers remained on Lehigh's football schedule, but press reports in 1970 make no mention of a Middle Three Conference champion.

Lehigh played its home games at Taylor Stadium on the university campus in Bethlehem, Pennsylvania.

== Schedule ==
Date	Opponent	Site	Result	Attendance	Source
September 19	C.W. Post	Taylor Stadium; Bethlehem, PA	W 7–0	8,000	
September 26	at Penn	Franklin Field; Philadelphia, PA	L 0–24	10,400–10,406	
October 3	at Cornell	Schoellkopf Field; Ithaca, NY	L 14–41	13,000	
October 10	Rutgers	Taylor Stadium; Bethlehem, PA	W 7–0	12,000	
October 17	at Drexel	Franklin Field; Philadelphia, PA	L 0–6	5,000–7,000	
October 24	at Gettysburg	Musselman Stadium; Gettysburg, PA	W 34–15	4,000–4,250	
October 31	at Colgate	Andy Kerr Stadium; Hamilton, NY	L 12–21	4,600	
November 7	No. 8 Delaware	Taylor Stadium; Bethlehem, PA (rivalry)	W 36–13	13,000	
November 14	Bucknell	Taylor Stadium; Bethlehem, PA	L 20–24	7,000	
November 21	at Lafayette	Fisher Field; Easton, PA (The Rivalry)	L 28–31	17,000	
Rankings from AP Poll released prior to the game
