= 1970 Northeastern Huskies football team =

American college football season

1970 Northeastern Huskies football
- Conference: Independent
- Record: 3–5
- Head coach: Joe Zabilski (23rd season)
- Home stadium: Parsons Field

1970 NCAA College Division independents football records
| | Conf. | | | Overall |
| Team | W | L | T | W | | L | | T |
|---|---|---|---|---|---|---|---|---|
| No. 4 Tampa | | – | | 10 | – | 1 | – | 0 |
| No. 5 Tennessee State | | – | | 10 | – | 0 | – | 0 |
| No. 11 Delaware | | – | | 9 | – | 2 | – | 0 |
| Hawaii | | – | | 9 | – | 2 | – | 0 |
| Northern Michigan | | – | | 8 | – | 2 | – | 0 |
| No. 19 Eastern Michigan | | – | | 7 | – | 2 | – | 1 |
| Mankato State | | – | | 7 | – | 2 | – | 1 |
| Akron | | – | | 7 | – | 3 | – | 0 |
| Central Michigan | | – | | 7 | – | 3 | – | 0 |
| Temple | | – | | 7 | – | 3 | – | 0 |
| Drake | | – | | 7 | – | 4 | – | 0 |
| Wayne State (MI) | | – | | 6 | – | 2 | – | 0 |
| Arkansas AM&N | | – | | 6 | – | 3 | – | 0 |
| Southern Illinois | | – | | 6 | – | 3 | – | 0 |
| St. Norbert | | – | | 6 | – | 3 | – | 0 |
| Nevada | | – | | 6 | – | 3 | – | 1 |
| Portland State | | – | | 6 | – | 4 | – | 0 |
| UNLV | | – | | 6 | – | 4 | – | 0 |
| Boston University | | – | | 5 | – | 4 | – | 0 |
| Cortland | | – | | 5 | – | 4 | – | 0 |
| Indiana (PA) | | – | | 5 | – | 4 | – | 0 |
| Santa Clara | | – | | 5 | – | 4 | – | 1 |
| Lafayette | | – | | 6 | – | 5 | – | 0 |
| Colorado College | | – | | 4 | – | 4 | – | 0 |
| Drexel | | – | | 4 | – | 4 | – | 0 |
| Hofstra | | – | | 5 | – | 5 | – | 0 |
| Indiana State | | – | | 5 | – | 5 | – | 0 |
| Samford | | – | | 5 | – | 5 | – | 0 |
| Wabash | | – | | 3 | – | 3 | – | 2 |
| Saint Mary's | | – | | 3 | – | 4 | – | 0 |
| Ashland | | – | | 4 | – | 6 | – | 0 |
| Bucknell | | – | | 4 | – | 6 | – | 0 |
| Lehigh | | – | | 4 | – | 6 | – | 0 |
| Rose Poly | | – | | 3 | – | 5 | – | 1 |
| Northeastern | | – | | 3 | – | 5 | – | 0 |
| Indiana Central | | – | | 3 | – | 6 | – | 0 |
| Lake Forest | | – | | 3 | – | 6 | – | 0 |
| Kentucky State | | – | | 3 | – | 6 | – | 0 |
| Chicago | | – | | 2 | – | 5 | – | 0 |
| Chattanooga | | – | | 3 | – | 8 | – | 0 |
| Parsons | | – | | 2 | – | 7 | – | 0 |
| Eastern Illinois | | – | | 2 | – | 8 | – | 0 |
| Milwaukee | | – | | 1 | – | 9 | – | 0 |
Rankings from AP small college poll

The 1970 Northeastern Huskies football team was an American football team that represented Northeastern University as an independent during the 1970 NCAA College Division football season. In their 23rd year under head coach Joe Zabilski, the team compiled a 3–5 record.

== Schedule ==
| Date | Opponent | Site | Result | Attendance | Source |
|---|---|---|---|---|---|
| September 26 | at Harvard | Harvard Stadium; Boston, MA | L 7–28 | 15,000 | |
| October 3 | Vermont | Parsons Field; Brookline, MA | W 34–21 | 4,220 | |
| October 10 | American International | Parsons Field; Brookline, MA | W 20–6 | 4,450 | |
| October 17 | at Springfield | Pratt Field; Springfield, MA | L 7–14 | 4,500–4,800 | |
| October 24 | New Hampshire | Parsons Field; Brookline, MA | L 7–33 | 4,130 | |
| October 31 | Maine | Parsons Field; Brookline, MA | L 17–24 | 5,000–5,610 | |
| November 7 | Cortland State | Parsons Field; Brookline, MA | L 7–8 | 3,840 | |
| November 21 | at Bridgeport | John F. Kennedy Stadium; Bridgeport, CT | W 9–7 | 6,480 | |
