= 1970 Tampa Spartans football team =

American college football season

1970 Tampa Spartans football
- Conference: Independent
- Record: 10–1
- Head coach: Fran Curci (3rd season)
- Home stadium: Tampa Stadium

1970 NCAA College Division independents football records
	Conf.			Overall
Team	W	L	T	W		L		T
No. 4 Tampa		–		10	–	1	–	0
No. 5 Tennessee State		–		10	–	0	–	0
No. 11 Delaware		–		9	–	2	–	0
Hawaii		–		9	–	2	–	0
Northern Michigan		–		8	–	2	–	0
No. 19 Eastern Michigan		–		7	–	2	–	1
Mankato State		–		7	–	2	–	1
Akron		–		7	–	3	–	0
Central Michigan		–		7	–	3	–	0
Temple		–		7	–	3	–	0
Drake		–		7	–	4	–	0
Wayne State (MI)		–		6	–	2	–	0
Arkansas AM&N		–		6	–	3	–	0
Southern Illinois		–		6	–	3	–	0
St. Norbert		–		6	–	3	–	0
Nevada		–		6	–	3	–	1
Portland State		–		6	–	4	–	0
UNLV		–		6	–	4	–	0
Boston University		–		5	–	4	–	0
Cortland		–		5	–	4	–	0
Indiana (PA)		–		5	–	4	–	0
Santa Clara		–		5	–	4	–	1
Lafayette		–		6	–	5	–	0
Colorado College		–		4	–	4	–	0
Drexel		–		4	–	4	–	0
Hofstra		–		5	–	5	–	0
Indiana State		–		5	–	5	–	0
Samford		–		5	–	5	–	0
Wabash		–		3	–	3	–	2
Saint Mary's		–		3	–	4	–	0
Ashland		–		4	–	6	–	0
Bucknell		–		4	–	6	–	0
Lehigh		–		4	–	6	–	0
Rose Poly		–		3	–	5	–	1
Northeastern		–		3	–	5	–	0
Indiana Central		–		3	–	6	–	0
Lake Forest		–		3	–	6	–	0
Kentucky State		–		3	–	6	–	0
Chicago		–		2	–	5	–	0
Chattanooga		–		3	–	8	–	0
Parsons		–		2	–	7	–	0
Eastern Illinois		–		2	–	8	–	0
Milwaukee		–		1	–	9	–	0
Rankings from AP small college poll

The 1970 Tampa Spartans football team represented the University of Tampa in the 1970 NCAA College Division football season. It was the Spartans' 34th season and competed as a College Division Independent. The team was led by head coach Fran Curci, in his third year, and played their home games at Tampa Stadium in Tampa, Florida. They finished with a record of ten wins and one loss (10–1).

Three Tampa players were recognized on the 1970 Little All-America college football team. Running back Leon McQuay received first-team honors, tackle John Morring received second-team honors, and defensive tackle Sammy Gellerstedt received third-team honors.

The Spartans opened the season with a 45–12 victory Delta State, and in the win Leon McQuay ran for 177 yards for Tampa in the win. In their second game, Tampa shutout New Mexico Highlands 20–0 in what was the Cowboys' first loss since 1966. After victories at Youngstown State and against North Texas State, the Spartans traveled to play at Miami on a Friday evening in their fifth game of the season. Against the Hurricanes, Tampa had one of the bigger upsets of the season with their 31–14 win. Former Miami quarterback Lew Pytel started for the Spartans, and the upset was considered unlikely to happen as Miami played in the University Division and the Spartans played in the lower College Division.

After their upset at Miami, Tampa was ranked as the No. 1 team in the College Division, returned home and defeated Xavier 33–10 to remain undefeated. The Spartans then won a pair of games in Louisiana against Louisiana Tech and Southwestern Louisiana before they returned home for the final three games of the season. In their 68–7 blowout victory over Idaho State, McQuay was the star as he rushed for 213 yards and had three touchdowns. Against Vanderbilt, Tampa was required to suspend five players, that included three starters on the defense, to comply with Southeastern Conference rules for transfer players as the Spartans played as an Independent. Without several of their defensive starters, Tampa lost their lone game of the season against the Commodores 28–36 before 35,893 fans. The Spartans then closed the season with a 49–7 win over Florida A&M and claimed the final No. 2 ranking. After the end of the season, on December 19, Curci was hired by Miami to serve as their new head coach.

== Schedule ==
Date	Time	Opponent	Rank	Site	Result	Attendance	Source
September 12		Delta State		Tampa Stadium; Tampa, FL	W 45–12	13,352	
September 26		New Mexico Highlands	No. T–16	Tampa Stadium; Tampa, FL	W 20–0	14,243	
October 3		at Youngstown State	No. 9	Rayen Stadium; Youngstown, OH	W 35–13		
October 10	8:00 p.m.	North Texas State	No. 8	Tampa Stadium; Tampa, FL	W 18–7	15,200	
October 16	8:15 p.m.	at Miami (FL)	No. 5	Miami Orange Bowl; Miami, FL	W 31–14	30,190	
October 24	8:00 p.m.	Xavier	No. 3	Tampa Stadium; Tampa, FL	W 33–10	19,123–19,132	
October 31		at Louisiana Tech	No. 3	Louisiana Tech Stadium; Ruston, LA	W 14–10	10,000	
November 7		at No. 7 Southwestern Louisiana	No. 4	McNaspy Stadium; Lafayette, LA	W 50–38	15,000	
November 14		Idaho State	No. 3	Tampa Stadium; Tampa, FL	W 68–7	20,238	
November 21		Vanderbilt	No. 4	Tampa Stadium; Tampa, FL	L 28–36	35,897	
November 28		Florida A&M	No. 5	Tampa Stadium; Tampa, FL	W 49–7	45,253	
Rankings from AP Poll released prior to the game; All times are in Eastern time
