= 1970 Drexel Dragons football team =

American college football season

1970 Drexel Dragons football
- Conference: Independent
- Record: 4–4
- Head coach: Sterling Brown (2nd season)
- Home stadium: Drexel Field

1970 NCAA College Division independents football records
	Conf.			Overall
Team	W	L	T	W		L		T
No. 4 Tampa		–		10	–	1	–	0
No. 5 Tennessee State		–		10	–	0	–	0
No. 11 Delaware		–		9	–	2	–	0
Hawaii		–		9	–	2	–	0
Northern Michigan		–		8	–	2	–	0
No. 19 Eastern Michigan		–		7	–	2	–	1
Mankato State		–		7	–	2	–	1
Akron		–		7	–	3	–	0
Central Michigan		–		7	–	3	–	0
Temple		–		7	–	3	–	0
Drake		–		7	–	4	–	0
Wayne State (MI)		–		6	–	2	–	0
Arkansas AM&N		–		6	–	3	–	0
Southern Illinois		–		6	–	3	–	0
St. Norbert		–		6	–	3	–	0
Nevada		–		6	–	3	–	1
Portland State		–		6	–	4	–	0
UNLV		–		6	–	4	–	0
Boston University		–		5	–	4	–	0
Cortland		–		5	–	4	–	0
Indiana (PA)		–		5	–	4	–	0
Santa Clara		–		5	–	4	–	1
Lafayette		–		6	–	5	–	0
Colorado College		–		4	–	4	–	0
Drexel		–		4	–	4	–	0
Hofstra		–		5	–	5	–	0
Indiana State		–		5	–	5	–	0
Samford		–		5	–	5	–	0
Wabash		–		3	–	3	–	2
Saint Mary's		–		3	–	4	–	0
Ashland		–		4	–	6	–	0
Bucknell		–		4	–	6	–	0
Lehigh		–		4	–	6	–	0
Rose Poly		–		3	–	5	–	1
Northeastern		–		3	–	5	–	0
Indiana Central		–		3	–	6	–	0
Lake Forest		–		3	–	6	–	0
Kentucky State		–		3	–	6	–	0
Chicago		–		2	–	5	–	0
Chattanooga		–		3	–	8	–	0
Parsons		–		2	–	7	–	0
Eastern Illinois		–		2	–	8	–	0
Milwaukee		–		1	–	9	–	0
Rankings from AP small college poll

The 1970 Drexel Dragons football team was an American football team that represented Drexel University as an independent during the 1970 NCAA College Division football season. In their second year under head coach Sterling Brown, the team compiled an overall record of 4–4.

Defensive back Lynn Ferguson was awarded third team on the 1970 Little All-America college football team.

== Schedule ==
Date	Opponent	Site	Result	Attendance	Source
September 26	Upsala	Drexel Field; Philadelphia, PA	W 34–18	2,000	
October 3	at Lafayette	Fisher Field; Easton, PA	L 14–19	6,500	
October 10	at Merchant Marine	Kings Point, NY	L 0–24	2,000	
October 17	Lehigh^{†}	Franklin Field; Philadelphia, PA	W 6–0	7,500	
October 24	at Albright	Albright Stadium; Reading, PA	W 14–7	2,000	
October 31	Pennsylvania Military	Drexel Field; Philadelphia, PA	W 6–0	1,500	
November 7	Gettysburg	Drexel Field; Philadelphia, PA	L 7–13	1,500	
November 14	at Hampden–Sydney	Everett Stadium; Hampden Sydney, VA	L 6–7	1,500	
^{†}Homecoming
