= 1970 Nevada Wolf Pack football team =

American college football season

1970 Nevada Wolf Pack football
- Conference: Independent
- Record: 6–3–1
- Head coach: Jerry Scattini (2nd season)
- Home stadium: Mackay Stadium

1970 NCAA College Division independents football records
| | Conf. | | | Overall |
| Team | W | L | T | W | | L | | T |
|---|---|---|---|---|---|---|---|---|
| No. 4 Tampa | | – | | 10 | – | 1 | – | 0 |
| No. 5 Tennessee State | | – | | 10 | – | 0 | – | 0 |
| No. 11 Delaware | | – | | 9 | – | 2 | – | 0 |
| Hawaii | | – | | 9 | – | 2 | – | 0 |
| Northern Michigan | | – | | 8 | – | 2 | – | 0 |
| No. 19 Eastern Michigan | | – | | 7 | – | 2 | – | 1 |
| Mankato State | | – | | 7 | – | 2 | – | 1 |
| Akron | | – | | 7 | – | 3 | – | 0 |
| Central Michigan | | – | | 7 | – | 3 | – | 0 |
| Temple | | – | | 7 | – | 3 | – | 0 |
| Drake | | – | | 7 | – | 4 | – | 0 |
| Wayne State (MI) | | – | | 6 | – | 2 | – | 0 |
| Arkansas AM&N | | – | | 6 | – | 3 | – | 0 |
| Southern Illinois | | – | | 6 | – | 3 | – | 0 |
| St. Norbert | | – | | 6 | – | 3 | – | 0 |
| Nevada | | – | | 6 | – | 3 | – | 1 |
| Portland State | | – | | 6 | – | 4 | – | 0 |
| UNLV | | – | | 6 | – | 4 | – | 0 |
| Boston University | | – | | 5 | – | 4 | – | 0 |
| Cortland | | – | | 5 | – | 4 | – | 0 |
| Indiana (PA) | | – | | 5 | – | 4 | – | 0 |
| Santa Clara | | – | | 5 | – | 4 | – | 1 |
| Lafayette | | – | | 6 | – | 5 | – | 0 |
| Colorado College | | – | | 4 | – | 4 | – | 0 |
| Drexel | | – | | 4 | – | 4 | – | 0 |
| Hofstra | | – | | 5 | – | 5 | – | 0 |
| Indiana State | | – | | 5 | – | 5 | – | 0 |
| Samford | | – | | 5 | – | 5 | – | 0 |
| Wabash | | – | | 3 | – | 3 | – | 2 |
| Saint Mary's | | – | | 3 | – | 4 | – | 0 |
| Ashland | | – | | 4 | – | 6 | – | 0 |
| Bucknell | | – | | 4 | – | 6 | – | 0 |
| Lehigh | | – | | 4 | – | 6 | – | 0 |
| Rose Poly | | – | | 3 | – | 5 | – | 1 |
| Northeastern | | – | | 3 | – | 5 | – | 0 |
| Indiana Central | | – | | 3 | – | 6 | – | 0 |
| Lake Forest | | – | | 3 | – | 6 | – | 0 |
| Kentucky State | | – | | 3 | – | 6 | – | 0 |
| Chicago | | – | | 2 | – | 5 | – | 0 |
| Chattanooga | | – | | 3 | – | 8 | – | 0 |
| Parsons | | – | | 2 | – | 7 | – | 0 |
| Eastern Illinois | | – | | 2 | – | 8 | – | 0 |
| Milwaukee | | – | | 1 | – | 9 | – | 0 |
Rankings from AP small college poll

The 1970 Nevada Wolf Pack football team represented the University of Nevada, Reno as an independent during the 1970 NCAA College Division football season. Led by second-year head coach Jerry Scattini, the Wolf Pack compiled a record of 6–3–1. The team played home games at Mackay Stadium in Reno, Nevada.

== Schedule ==
| Date | Opponent | Site | Result | Attendance | Source |
|---|---|---|---|---|---|
| September 19 | at San Francisco | Kezar Stadium; San Francisco, CA | W 28–6 | 2,900–4,200 | |
| September 26 | UC Riverside | Mackay Stadium; Reno, NV | W 45–26 | 4,000 | |
| October 3 | at Willamette | McCulloch Stadium; Salem, OR | W 30–3 | 3,500 | |
| October 10 | at No. 12 Cal Poly | Mustang Stadium; San Luis Obispo, CA | L 0–35 | 6,910 | |
| October 17 | Sacramento State | Hornet Stadium; Sacramento, CA | W 18–14 | 2,500–4,000 | |
| October 24 | Santa Clara^{†} | Mackay Stadium; Reno, NV | T 28–28 | 6,850 | |
| October 31 | at UC Davis | Toomey Field; Davis, CA | L 17–35 | 7,000 | |
| November 7 | Eastern Oregon | Mackay Stadium; Reno, NV | W 61–14 | 2,050 | |
| November 14 | Valley State | Mackay Stadium; Reno, NV | W 23–17 | 4,000–4,050 | |
| November 21 | at UNLV | Butcher Field; Sunrise Manor, NV (Fremont Cannon) | L 30–42 | 6,000 | |
^{†}Homecoming; Rankings from UPI Poll released prior to the game
