= 1970 Bucknell Bison football team =

American college football season

1970 Bucknell Bison football
- Conference: Independent
- Record: 4–6
- Head coach: Fred Prender (2nd season)
- Captains: Gene Depew; Don Giacomelli
- Home stadium: Memorial Stadium

1970 NCAA College Division independents football records
	Conf.			Overall
Team	W	L	T	W		L		T
No. 4 Tampa		–		10	–	1	–	0
No. 5 Tennessee State		–		10	–	0	–	0
No. 11 Delaware		–		9	–	2	–	0
Hawaii		–		9	–	2	–	0
Northern Michigan		–		8	–	2	–	0
No. 19 Eastern Michigan		–		7	–	2	–	1
Mankato State		–		7	–	2	–	1
Akron		–		7	–	3	–	0
Central Michigan		–		7	–	3	–	0
Temple		–		7	–	3	–	0
Drake		–		7	–	4	–	0
Wayne State (MI)		–		6	–	2	–	0
Arkansas AM&N		–		6	–	3	–	0
Southern Illinois		–		6	–	3	–	0
St. Norbert		–		6	–	3	–	0
Nevada		–		6	–	3	–	1
Portland State		–		6	–	4	–	0
UNLV		–		6	–	4	–	0
Boston University		–		5	–	4	–	0
Cortland		–		5	–	4	–	0
Indiana (PA)		–		5	–	4	–	0
Santa Clara		–		5	–	4	–	1
Lafayette		–		6	–	5	–	0
Colorado College		–		4	–	4	–	0
Drexel		–		4	–	4	–	0
Hofstra		–		5	–	5	–	0
Indiana State		–		5	–	5	–	0
Samford		–		5	–	5	–	0
Wabash		–		3	–	3	–	2
Saint Mary's		–		3	–	4	–	0
Ashland		–		4	–	6	–	0
Bucknell		–		4	–	6	–	0
Lehigh		–		4	–	6	–	0
Rose Poly		–		3	–	5	–	1
Northeastern		–		3	–	5	–	0
Indiana Central		–		3	–	6	–	0
Lake Forest		–		3	–	6	–	0
Kentucky State		–		3	–	6	–	0
Chicago		–		2	–	5	–	0
Chattanooga		–		3	–	8	–	0
Parsons		–		2	–	7	–	0
Eastern Illinois		–		2	–	8	–	0
Milwaukee		–		1	–	9	–	0
Rankings from AP small college poll

The 1970 Bucknell Bison football team was an American football team that represented Bucknell University as an independent during the 1970 NCAA College Division football season.

In their second year under head coach Fred Prender, the Bison compiled a 4–6 record. Gene Depew and Don Giacomelli were the team captains.

Following the decision by the Middle Atlantic Conference to end football competition in its University Division, the Bison competed as a football independent in 1970, though five of the former league rivals (Bucknell, Delaware, Gettysburg, Lafayette and Lehigh) continued to play an informal round-robin called the "Middle Five".

Bucknell also played Temple, another matchup that had been a divisional game in 1969. The two MAC teams had met annually since 1927, competing for a rivalry trophy known as "The Old Shoe". This year saw their last meeting for nearly 50 years.

Bucknell played its home games at Memorial Stadium on the university campus in Lewisburg, Pennsylvania.

== Schedule ==
Date	Opponent	Site	Result	Attendance	Source
September 19	Temple	Memorial Stadium; Lewisburg, PA	L 3–10	4,850–5,000	
September 26	Baldwin–Wallace	Memorial Stadium; Lewisburg, PA	L 21–29	5,725	
October 3	Gettysburg^{†}	Memorial Stadium; Lewisburg, PA	W 14–6	8,500	
October 10	at Davidson	Richardson Stadium; Davidson, NC	W 21–20	4,000	
October 17	at The Citadel	Johnson Hagood Stadium; Charleston, SC	L 28–42	13,350	
October 26	Lafayette^	Memorial Stadium; Lewisburg, PA	W 30–28	10,000–10,115	
October 31	at Rutgers	Rutgers Stadium; Piscataway, NJ	L 7–21	7,500	
November 7	Colgate	Memorial Stadium; Lewisburg, PA	L 14–44	7,000	
November 14	at Lehigh	Taylor Stadium; Bethlehem, PA	W 24–20	7,000	
November 21	at No. 16 Delaware	Delaware Stadium; Newark, DE	L 0–42	16,827	
^{†}Homecoming; ^ Parents Weekend; Rankings from AP Poll released prior to the game
