= 1970 Boston University Terriers football team =

American college football season

1970 Boston University Terriers football
- Conference: Independent
- Record: 5–4
- Head coach: Larry Naviaux (2nd season)
- Home stadium: Nickerson Field

1970 NCAA College Division independents football records
	Conf.			Overall
Team	W	L	T	W		L		T
No. 4 Tampa		–		10	–	1	–	0
No. 5 Tennessee State		–		10	–	0	–	0
No. 11 Delaware		–		9	–	2	–	0
Hawaii		–		9	–	2	–	0
Northern Michigan		–		8	–	2	–	0
No. 19 Eastern Michigan		–		7	–	2	–	1
Mankato State		–		7	–	2	–	1
Akron		–		7	–	3	–	0
Central Michigan		–		7	–	3	–	0
Temple		–		7	–	3	–	0
Drake		–		7	–	4	–	0
Wayne State (MI)		–		6	–	2	–	0
Arkansas AM&N		–		6	–	3	–	0
Southern Illinois		–		6	–	3	–	0
St. Norbert		–		6	–	3	–	0
Nevada		–		6	–	3	–	1
Portland State		–		6	–	4	–	0
UNLV		–		6	–	4	–	0
Boston University		–		5	–	4	–	0
Cortland		–		5	–	4	–	0
Indiana (PA)		–		5	–	4	–	0
Santa Clara		–		5	–	4	–	1
Lafayette		–		6	–	5	–	0
Colorado College		–		4	–	4	–	0
Drexel		–		4	–	4	–	0
Hofstra		–		5	–	5	–	0
Indiana State		–		5	–	5	–	0
Samford		–		5	–	5	–	0
Wabash		–		3	–	3	–	2
Saint Mary's		–		3	–	4	–	0
Ashland		–		4	–	6	–	0
Bucknell		–		4	–	6	–	0
Lehigh		–		4	–	6	–	0
Rose Poly		–		3	–	5	–	1
Illinois College		–		3	–	5	–	0
Northeastern		–		3	–	5	–	0
Indiana Central		–		3	–	6	–	0
Lake Forest		–		3	–	6	–	0
Kentucky State		–		3	–	6	–	0
Chicago		–		2	–	5	–	0
Chattanooga		–		3	–	8	–	0
Parsons		–		2	–	7	–	0
Eastern Illinois		–		2	–	8	–	0
Milwaukee		–		1	–	9	–	0
Rankings from AP small college poll

The 1970 Boston University Terriers football team was an American football team that represented Boston University as an independent during the 1970 NCAA College Division football season. In their second season under head coach Larry Naviaux, the Terriers compiled a 5–4 record and outscored opponents by a total of 199 to 141.

Guard Bill Soucy received second-team honors on the 1970 Little All-America college football team.

== Schedule ==
Date	Opponent	Site	Result	Attendance	Source
September 19	Colgate	Nickerson Field; Boston, MA	L 21–26	6,187–8,000	
September 26	at Vermont	Centennial Field; Burlington, VT	W 48–6	6,800	
October 3	Temple	Nickerson Field; Boston, MA	L 7–10	5,300–5,353	
October 10	at UMass	Alumni Stadium; Hadley, MA	W 13–10	9,500	
October 17	Holy Cross	Nickerson Field; Boston, MA	W 33–23	6,247	
October 24	at Rhode Island	Meade Stadium; Kingston, RI	W 21–0	6,200–8,800	
October 31	at Connecticut	Memorial Stadium; Storrs, CT (rivalry)	W 34–9	14,006	
November 7	Rutgers	Nickerson Field; Boston, MA	L 3–6	6,177–7,514	
November 14	at No. 18 Delaware	Delaware Stadium; Newark, DE	L 19–51	14,949	
Rankings from AP Poll released prior to the game
