= 1970 Delaware Fightin' Blue Hens football team =

American college football season

1970 Delaware Fightin' Blue Hens football

Lambert Cup

Boardwalk Bowl, W 38–23 vs. Morgan State
- Conference: Independent
- Record: 9–2
- Head coach: Tubby Raymond (5th season)
- Offensive coordinator: Ted Kempski (3rd season)
- Offensive scheme: Delaware Wing-T
- Base defense: 5–2
- Captain: Ray Holcomb
- Home stadium: Delaware Stadium

1970 NCAA College Division independents football records
| | Conf. | | | Overall |
| Team | W | L | T | W | | L | | T |
|---|---|---|---|---|---|---|---|---|
| No. 4 Tampa | | – | | 10 | – | 1 | – | 0 |
| No. 5 Tennessee State | | – | | 10 | – | 0 | – | 0 |
| No. 11 Delaware | | – | | 9 | – | 2 | – | 0 |
| Hawaii | | – | | 9 | – | 2 | – | 0 |
| Northern Michigan | | – | | 8 | – | 2 | – | 0 |
| No. 19 Eastern Michigan | | – | | 7 | – | 2 | – | 1 |
| Mankato State | | – | | 7 | – | 2 | – | 1 |
| Akron | | – | | 7 | – | 3 | – | 0 |
| Central Michigan | | – | | 7 | – | 3 | – | 0 |
| Temple | | – | | 7 | – | 3 | – | 0 |
| Drake | | – | | 7 | – | 4 | – | 0 |
| Wayne State (MI) | | – | | 6 | – | 2 | – | 0 |
| Arkansas AM&N | | – | | 6 | – | 3 | – | 0 |
| Southern Illinois | | – | | 6 | – | 3 | – | 0 |
| St. Norbert | | – | | 6 | – | 3 | – | 0 |
| Nevada | | – | | 6 | – | 3 | – | 1 |
| Portland State | | – | | 6 | – | 4 | – | 0 |
| UNLV | | – | | 6 | – | 4 | – | 0 |
| Boston University | | – | | 5 | – | 4 | – | 0 |
| Cortland | | – | | 5 | – | 4 | – | 0 |
| Indiana (PA) | | – | | 5 | – | 4 | – | 0 |
| Santa Clara | | – | | 5 | – | 4 | – | 1 |
| Lafayette | | – | | 6 | – | 5 | – | 0 |
| Colorado College | | – | | 4 | – | 4 | – | 0 |
| Drexel | | – | | 4 | – | 4 | – | 0 |
| Hofstra | | – | | 5 | – | 5 | – | 0 |
| Indiana State | | – | | 5 | – | 5 | – | 0 |
| Samford | | – | | 5 | – | 5 | – | 0 |
| Wabash | | – | | 3 | – | 3 | – | 2 |
| Saint Mary's | | – | | 3 | – | 4 | – | 0 |
| Ashland | | – | | 4 | – | 6 | – | 0 |
| Bucknell | | – | | 4 | – | 6 | – | 0 |
| Lehigh | | – | | 4 | – | 6 | – | 0 |
| Rose Poly | | – | | 3 | – | 5 | – | 1 |
| Illinois College | | – | | 3 | – | 5 | – | 0 |
| Northeastern | | – | | 3 | – | 5 | – | 0 |
| Indiana Central | | – | | 3 | – | 6 | – | 0 |
| Lake Forest | | – | | 3 | – | 6 | – | 0 |
| Kentucky State | | – | | 3 | – | 6 | – | 0 |
| Chicago | | – | | 2 | – | 5 | – | 0 |
| Chattanooga | | – | | 3 | – | 8 | – | 0 |
| Parsons | | – | | 2 | – | 7 | – | 0 |
| Eastern Illinois | | – | | 2 | – | 8 | – | 0 |
| Milwaukee | | – | | 1 | – | 9 | – | 0 |
Rankings from AP small college poll

The 1970 Delaware Fightin' Blue Hens football team was an American football team that represented the University of Delaware as an independent during the 1970 NCAA College Division football season.

In its fifth season under head coach Tubby Raymond, the team compiled a 9–2 record, won the Lambert Cup Eastern small college championship, defeated Morgan State in the Boardwalk Bowl, and outscored all opponents by a total of 403 to 207. Roy Holcomb was the team captain.

Following the decision by the Middle Atlantic Conference to end football competition in its University Division, the Blue Hens competed as a football independent in 1970, though five of the former league rivals (Bucknell, Delaware, Gettysburg, Lafayette and Lehigh) continued to play an informal round-robin called the "Middle Five".

Guard Conway Haymon received first-team honors on the 1970 Little All-America college football team, and running back Chuck Hall received second-team honors.

The team played its home games at Delaware Stadium in Newark, Delaware.

== Schedule ==
| Date | Opponent | Rank | Site | Result | Attendance | Source |
|---|---|---|---|---|---|---|
| September 12 | West Chester | | Delaware Stadium; Newark, DE (rivalry) | W 39–22 | 17,318 | |
| September 19 | at Gettysburg | | Musselman Stadium; Gettysburg, PA | W 34–7 | 4,892 | |
| September 26 | New Hampshire | No. 5 | Delaware Stadium; Newark, DE | W 53–12 | 13,348 | |
| October 3 | Villanova | No. 4 | Delaware Stadium; Newark, DE (rivalry) | L 31–34 | 19,067 | |
| October 10 | Lafayette | No. 11 | Delaware Stadium; Newark, DE | W 36–20 | 17,116 | |
| October 17 | at Rutgers | No. 7 | Rutgers Stadium; Piscataway, NJ | W 54–21 | 16,500 | |
| October 31 | at Temple | No. 7 | Temple Stadium; Philadelphia, PA | W 15–13 | 14,000 | |
| November 7 | at Lehigh | No. 8 | Taylor Stadium; Bethlehem, PA (rivalry) | L 13–36 | 13,000 | |
| November 14 | Boston University | No. 18 | Delaware Stadium; Newark, DE | W 51–19 | 14,949 | |
| November 21 | Bucknell | No. 16 | Delaware Stadium; Newark, DE | W 42–0 | 16,827 | |
| December 12 | vs. Morgan State | No. 11 | Atlantic City Convention Center; Atlantic City, NJ (Boardwalk Bowl) | W 38–23 | 10,078 | |
Rankings from AP Poll released prior to the game
