= 1970 Hawaii Rainbows football team =

American college football season

1970 Hawaii Rainbows football
- Conference: Independent
- Record: 9–2
- Head coach: Dave Holmes (3rd season)
- Home stadium: Honolulu Stadium

1970 NCAA College Division independents football records
	Conf.			Overall
Team	W	L	T	W		L		T
No. 4 Tampa		–		10	–	1	–	0
No. 5 Tennessee State		–		10	–	0	–	0
No. 11 Delaware		–		9	–	2	–	0
Hawaii		–		9	–	2	–	0
Northern Michigan		–		8	–	2	–	0
No. 19 Eastern Michigan		–		7	–	2	–	1
Mankato State		–		7	–	2	–	1
Akron		–		7	–	3	–	0
Central Michigan		–		7	–	3	–	0
Temple		–		7	–	3	–	0
Drake		–		7	–	4	–	0
Wayne State (MI)		–		6	–	2	–	0
Arkansas AM&N		–		6	–	3	–	0
Southern Illinois		–		6	–	3	–	0
St. Norbert		–		6	–	3	–	0
Nevada		–		6	–	3	–	1
Portland State		–		6	–	4	–	0
UNLV		–		6	–	4	–	0
Boston University		–		5	–	4	–	0
Cortland		–		5	–	4	–	0
Indiana (PA)		–		5	–	4	–	0
Santa Clara		–		5	–	4	–	1
Lafayette		–		6	–	5	–	0
Colorado College		–		4	–	4	–	0
Drexel		–		4	–	4	–	0
Hofstra		–		5	–	5	–	0
Indiana State		–		5	–	5	–	0
Samford		–		5	–	5	–	0
Wabash		–		3	–	3	–	2
Saint Mary's		–		3	–	4	–	0
Ashland		–		4	–	6	–	0
Bucknell		–		4	–	6	–	0
Lehigh		–		4	–	6	–	0
Rose Poly		–		3	–	5	–	1
Northeastern		–		3	–	5	–	0
Indiana Central		–		3	–	6	–	0
Lake Forest		–		3	–	6	–	0
Kentucky State		–		3	–	6	–	0
Chicago		–		2	–	5	–	0
Chattanooga		–		3	–	8	–	0
Parsons		–		2	–	7	–	0
Eastern Illinois		–		2	–	8	–	0
Milwaukee		–		1	–	9	–	0
Rankings from AP small college poll

The 1970 Hawaii Rainbows football team represented the University of Hawaiʻi at Mānoa as an independent during the 1970 NCAA College Division football season. In their third season under head coach Dave Holmes, the Rainbows compiled a 9–2 record.

Guard Jim Kalill received second-team honors on the 1970 Little All-America college football team.

== Schedule ==
Date	Time	Opponent	Site	Result	Attendance	Source
September 19		United States International	Honolulu Stadium; Honolulu, HI	W 14–13	16,889	
September 26		at Long Beach State	Veterans Memorial Stadium; Long Beach, CA	W 23–14	10,351	
October 3		Santa Clara	Honolulu Stadium; Honolulu, HI	W 39–24	16,175	
October 10		Cal Poly Pomona	Honolulu Stadium; Honolulu, HI	W 39–10	16,410	
October 24		at UC Santa Barbara	Campus Stadium; Santa Barbara, CA	L 20–22	5,000	
October 31		Cal State Los Angeles^{†}	Honolulu Stadium; Honolulu, HI	W 31–7	10,121	
November 7		at UNLV	Butcher Field; Las Vegas, NV	W 28–21	5,002	
November 14		Linfield	Honolulu Stadium; Honolulu, HI	W 19–17	17,181	
November 21	8:00 p.m.	Pacific (CA)	Honolulu Stadium; Honolulu, HI	W 14–0	17,362	
November 28		Fresno State	Honolulu Stadium; Honolulu, HI (rivalry)	W 49–0	9,319	
December 5		New Mexico Highlands	Honolulu Stadium; Honolulu, HI	L 10–21	14,503	
^{†}Homecoming; All times are in Hawaii–Aleutian time
