= Saint Peter's Peacocks football =

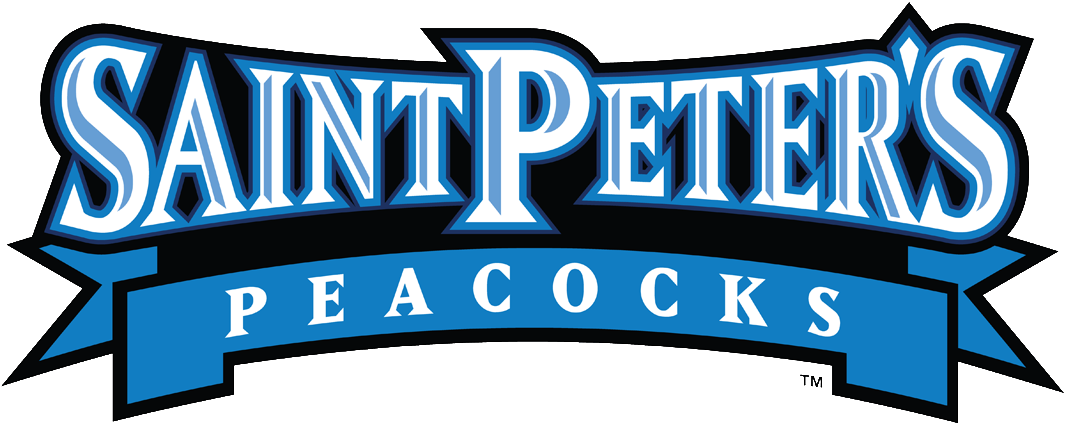
- First season: 1971
- Last season: 2006; 20 years ago
- Location: Jersey City, New Jersey
- Stadium: Cochrane Stadium (capacity: 4,000)
- NCAA division: Division I FCS
- Conference: Metro Atlantic Athletic Conference (MAAC)
- Colors: Blue and white
- Fight song: "Io Pavo"

For information on all Saint Peter's College sports, see Saint Peter's Peacocks

The Saint Peter's Peacocks football program was the intercollegiate American football program of Saint Peter's College in Jersey City, New Jersey. The team competed at the NCAA Division I Football Championship Subdivision (FCS) level and was a member of the Metro Atlantic Athletic Conference (MAAC). The school's first football team was fielded in 1971 and played their home games at Roosevelt Stadium until 1981. The Peacocks played their home games at Cochrane Stadium in Jersey City.

The football program was discontinued at the conclusion of the 2006 season.
