= 1971 Milwaukee Panthers football team =

American college football season

1971 Milwaukee Panthers football
- Conference: Independent
- Record: 5–5
- Head coach: Jerry Fishbain (1st season)
- Home stadium: Milwaukee County Stadium; Whitefish Bay Stadium

1971 NCAA College Division independents football records
	Conf.			Overall
Team	W	L	T	W		L		T
No. 1 Delaware		–		10	–	1	–	0
No. 5 Tennessee State		–		9	–	1	–	0
No. 2 McNeese State		–		9	–	1	–	1
Samford		–		8	–	1	–	0
Colorado College		–		7	–	1	–	0
No. 8 Akron		–		8	–	2	–	0
No. 3 Eastern Michigan		–		7	–	1	–	2
Arkansas AM&N		–		7	–	2	–	0
Indiana (PA)		–		7	–	2	–	0
Kentucky State		–		8	–	3	–	0
Appalachian State		–		7	–	3	–	1
Northern Michigan		–		7	–	3	–	0
Hawaii		–		7	–	4	–	0
Illinois College		–		5	–	3	–	0
Ashland		–		6	–	4	–	0
Santa Clara		–		6	–	4	–	0
Southern Illinois		–		6	–	4	–	0
Tampa		–		6	–	5	–	0
UNLV		–		5	–	4	–	1
Bucknell		–		5	–	5	–	0
Central Michigan		–		5	–	5	–	0
Milwaukee		–		5	–	5	–	0
Nevada		–		5	–	5	–	0
St. Norbert		–		5	–	5	–	0
Wayne State (MI)		–		4	–	4	–	0
Hofstra		–		5	–	6	–	0
Cortland		–		4	–	5	–	0
Northeastern		–		4	–	5	–	0
Portland State		–		4	–	5	–	0
Ball State		–		4	–	5	–	1
Chicago		–		3	–	4	–	0
Northeast Louisiana		–		4	–	6	–	1
Eastern Illinois		–		4	–	6	–	0
Indiana State		–		4	–	6	–	0
Saint Mary's		–		3	–	5	–	0
Rose-Hulman		–		3	–	6	–	0
Boston University		–		3	–	7	–	0
Drexel		–		2	–	6	–	0
Chattanooga		–		2	–	9	–	0
Rankings from AP small college poll

The 1971 Milwaukee Panthers football team represented the University of Wisconsin–Milwaukee as an independent during the 1971 NCAA College Division football season. Led by Jerry Fishbain in his first season as head coach, Milwaukee compiled a record of 5–5. The Panthers offense scored 134 points while the defense allowed 147 points.

== Schedule ==
Date	Opponent	Site	Result	Attendance	Source
September 18	at Winona State	Maxwell Field; Winona, MN	W 25–0	1,500	
September 25	Eastern Illinois	Whitefish Bay Stadium; Whitefish Bay, WI	W 22–19	1,347	
October 2	at Western Illinois	Hanson Field; Macomb, IL	L 14–45	9,138	
October 9	Missouri–Rolla	Milwaukee County Stadium; Milwaukee, WI	L 6–7	3,300	
October 16	at Chicago Circle	Soldier Field; Chicago, IL	W 41–0	250	
October 23	No. 3 Eastern Michigan	Milwaukee County Stadium; Milwaukee, WI	L 0–31	2,500	
October 30	at St. Norbert	Minahan Stadium; De Pere, WI	L 6–24	2,700	
November 6	at Wayne State (MI)	Wayne State Stadium; Detroit, MI	W 7–0		
November 13	Minnesota–Duluth	Milwaukee County Stadium; Milwaukee, WI	W 13–0		
November 20	at Illinois State	Hancock Stadium; Normal, IL	L 0–21	4,000	
Rankings from AP Poll released prior to the game; Source:
