= UPI small college football rankings =

The UPI small college football rankings was a system used by the United Press International (UPI) from 1958 to 1974 to rank the best small college football teams in the United States.

The UPI announced in September 1958 that it had formed a Small-College Football Rating Board consisting of 47 coaches charged on a weekly basis with ranking the nation's best "small college" football teams. The initial board was made up of one coach from each of 47 states. Each coach was asked to submit a weekly ballot ranking the ten best teams out of the 519 small-college football programs. The rankings included schools that were members of the National Collegiate Athletic Association (NCAA), members of the National Association of Intercollegiate Athletics (NAIA), and members of both or neither. The team ranked No. 1 at the end of the year was presented with a trophy by the UPI.

The Associated Press (AP) also published small college football rankings by a board of experts from 1960 to 1974. The national champions selected by the AP small college poll matched those of UPI on ten occasions. In the other five years, the AP selected Florida A&M in 1962, Northern Illinois in 1963, Wittenberg in 1964, North Dakota State in 1968, and Central Michigan in 1974.

== Top teams in final polls ==
The following chart lists the top five teams in the final UPI small college rankings for each year from 1958 to 1974. The figures in brackets reflect the number of first-place votes received in the final voting. The figures in parentheses reflect the total points received.

Year	No. 1	No. 2	No. 3	No. 4	No. 5	Source
1958	Mississippi Southern [36] (403)	Miami (OH) (215)	Arizona State–Flagstaff [2] (209)	Northeastern State (OK) [1] (205)	East Texas State (172)	
1959	Bowling Green [23] (407)	Mississippi Southern [5] (247)	Middle Tennessee [2] (231)	Delaware [1] (211)	East Texas State (179)	
1960	Ohio [28] (343)	Bowling Green (250)	Lenoir–Rhyne [3] (236)	Muskingum [1] (100)	Florida A&M (94)	
1961	Pittsburg State [14] (250)	Baldwin–Wallace [1] (179)	Mississippi Southern [4] (163)	Southeastern Louisiana (148)	Fresno State [8] (147)	
1962	Southern Mississippi [19] (286)	Florida A&M [7] (273)	Central State (OK) [3] (233)	Lenoir–Rhyne (204)	Wittenberg [2] (126)	
1963	Delaware [18] (309)	Northern Illinois [8] (285)	UMass [1] (160)	Saint John's (MN) [1] (158)	Wittenberg (153)	
1964	Cal State Los Angeles [26] (318)	Wittenberg [7] (278)	UMass (217)	East Carolina (196)	Concordia (MN) [1] (152); Louisiana Tech [1] (152)	
1965	North Dakota State [21] (301)	Cal State Los Angeles [2] (224)	Middle Tennessee State [3] (209)	East Carolina [1] (187)	Weber State [3] (117)	
1966	San Diego State [30] (336)	Montana State [3] (272)	Tennessee State [1] (242)	Northwestern State (166)	North Dakota (161)	
1967	San Diego State [17] (317)	North Dakota State [14] (299)	Texas–Arlington [2] (205)	Fairmont State [1] (194)	West Chester State [1] (132)	
1968	San Diego State [21] (312)	North Dakota State [9] (300)	Chattanooga (236)	New Mexico Highlands (209)	Texas A&I (184)	
1969	North Dakota State [24] (319)	Montana [8] (295)	Colorado State–Greeley [1] (197)	Akron (186)	Arkansas State (173)	
1970	Arkansas State [21] (318)	Tampa [8] (279)	Montana [3] (272)	North Dakota State (201)	Tennessee State [1] (173)	
1971	Delaware [20] (306)	McNeese State [5] (267)	Eastern Michigan [3] (238)	Tennessee State [1] (185)	C.W. Post (130)	
1972	Delaware [21] (334)	Louisiana Tech [12] (310)	Cal Poly [1] (239)	South Dakota [1] (193)	Tennessee State (184)	
1973	Tennessee State [27] (314)	Western Kentucky [3] (275)	Louisiana Tech [1] (224)	Abilene Christian (224)	Wittenberg (169)	
1974	Louisiana Tech [27] (322)	UNLV [5] (254)	Boise State [1] (188)	Delaware (168)	Texas A&I (132)	
