= AP small college football rankings =

The AP small college football rankings was a system used by the Associated Press (AP) from 1960 to 1974 to rank the best small college football teams in the United States.

The United Press International led the way with its UPI small college football rankings starting in 1958. The AP followed with its own small-college rankings starting in October 1960. The AP rankings were issued weekly and were based on ballots cast by an AP board of experts, consisting of one person in each of eight NCAA districts. The national champions selected by AP and UPI differed on five occasions: 1962, 1963, 1964, 1968, and 1974.

== Top teams in final polls ==
The following chart lists the top five teams in the final AP small college rankings for each year from 1960 to 1974. The figures in brackets reflect the number of first-place votes received in the final voting. The figures in parentheses reflect the total points received.

Year	No. 1	No. 2	No. 3	No. 4	No. 5	Source
1960	Ohio [4] (65)	Lenoir–Rhyne (46)	Humboldt State [1] (34)	Whitworth (32)	West Chester Teachers [1] (30)	
1961	Pittsburg State [5] (70)	Baldwin–Wallace (60)	Fresno State (45)	Florida A&M (42)	Whittier (34)	
1962	Florida A&M (67)	Wittenberg (66)	Central State (OK) (54)	Southern Miss (44)	Lenoir–Rhyne (34)	
1963	Northern Illinois [3] (63)	Delaware [3] (53)	Wittenberg (38)	UMass (37)	Saint John's (MN) (35)	
1964	Wittenberg [6] (114)	Prairie View A&M (101)	Cal State Los Angeles [2] (97)	Louisiana Tech (89)	San Diego State [1] (67)	
1965	North Dakota State [4] (84)	Middle Tennessee State [2] (68)	Sul Ross [1] (43)	Cal State Los Angeles (35)	Tennessee State (32)	
1966	San Diego State [14] (158)	Tennessee State [2] (126)	Montana State (113)	Northwestern State (72)	Parsons (70)	
1967	San Diego State [12] (157)	North Dakota State [2] (137)	New Mexico Highlands [1] (93)	Texas–Arlington [1] (76)	Eastern Kentucky (75)	
1968	North Dakota State [6] (220)	San Diego State [3] (204)	Chattanooga [1] (162)	New Mexico Highlands (147)	IUP (142)	
1969	North Dakota State	Montana	Akron	Louisiana Tech	Colorado State-Greeley	
1970	Arkansas State	Montana	North Dakota State	Tampa	Tennessee State	
1971	Delaware	McNeese State	Eastern Michigan	Louisiana Tech	Tennessee State	
1972	Delaware	Louisiana Tech	Cal Poly	Ashland	Tennessee State	
1973	Tennessee State [17] (708)	Louisiana Tech [21] (706)	Western Kentucky (459)	Wittenberg [1] (407)	Boise State (390); Abilene Christian (390)	
1974	Central Michigan [32] (658)	Louisiana Tech (477)	Texas A&I [2] (461]	Delaware (460)	Boise State (401)	
