= 1971 Appalachian State Mountaineers football team =

American college football season

1971 Appalachian State Mountaineers football
- Conference: Independent
- Record: 7–3–1
- Head coach: Jim Brakefield (1st season)
- Home stadium: Conrad Stadium

1971 NCAA College Division independents football records
	Conf.			Overall
Team	W	L	T	W		L		T
No. 1 Delaware		–		10	–	1	–	0
No. 5 Tennessee State		–		9	–	1	–	0
No. 2 McNeese State		–		9	–	1	–	1
Samford		–		8	–	1	–	0
Colorado College		–		7	–	1	–	0
No. 8 Akron		–		8	–	2	–	0
No. 3 Eastern Michigan		–		7	–	1	–	2
Arkansas AM&N		–		7	–	2	–	0
Indiana (PA)		–		7	–	2	–	0
Kentucky State		–		8	–	3	–	0
Appalachian State		–		7	–	3	–	1
Northern Michigan		–		7	–	3	–	0
Hawaii		–		7	–	4	–	0
Illinois College		–		5	–	3	–	0
Ashland		–		6	–	4	–	0
Santa Clara		–		6	–	4	–	0
Southern Illinois		–		6	–	4	–	0
Tampa		–		6	–	5	–	0
UNLV		–		5	–	4	–	1
Bucknell		–		5	–	5	–	0
Central Michigan		–		5	–	5	–	0
Milwaukee		–		5	–	5	–	0
Nevada		–		5	–	5	–	0
St. Norbert		–		5	–	5	–	0
Wayne State (MI)		–		4	–	4	–	0
Hofstra		–		5	–	6	–	0
Cortland		–		4	–	5	–	0
Northeastern		–		4	–	5	–	0
Portland State		–		4	–	5	–	0
Ball State		–		4	–	5	–	1
Chicago		–		3	–	4	–	0
Northeast Louisiana		–		4	–	6	–	1
Eastern Illinois		–		4	–	6	–	0
Indiana State		–		4	–	6	–	0
Saint Mary's		–		3	–	5	–	0
Rose-Hulman		–		3	–	6	–	0
Boston University		–		3	–	7	–	0
Drexel		–		2	–	6	–	0
Chattanooga		–		2	–	9	–	0
Rankings from AP small college poll

The 1971 Appalachian State Mountaineers football team was an American football team that represented Appalachian State University as an independent during the 1971 NCAA College Division football season. In their first year under head coach Jim Brakefield, the Mountaineers compiled an overall record of 7–3–1. Brakefield was hired from Wofford in January 1971 to replace Carl Messere who resigned to focus exclusively on his teaching duties. This was the Mountaineers' first year playing as a member of the NCAA, as they made the transition from the NAIA over the off-season.

== Schedule ==
Date	Opponent	Site	Result	Attendance	Source
September 11	at Furman	Sirrine Stadium; Greenville, SC	T 0–0	5,000	
September 18	at East Tennessee State	Memorial Stadium; Johnson City, TN	W 28–24	7,000	
September 25	Western Carolina	Conrad Stadium; Boone, NC (rivalry)	L 0–26	10,300	
October 2	vs. Davidson	American Legion Memorial Stadium; Charlotte, NC	W 35–10	5,626	
October 9	Lenoir Rhyne	Conrad Stadium; Boone, NC	W 14–0	9,000	
October 16	Catawba^{†}	Conrad Stadium; Boone, NC	W 55–21	10,500	
October 23	Bluefield State	Conrad Stadium; Boone, NC	W 49–0	950	
October 30	at Wofford	Snyder Field; Spartanburg, SC	L 16–26	6,500	
November 6	Florence State	Conrad Stadium; Boone, NC	W 59–6	5,000	
November 13	at Eastern Kentucky	Hanger Field; Richmond, KY	L 14–28	13,250	
November 20	at Elon	Burlington Memorial Stadium; Burlington, NC	W 14–10	9,000	
^{†}Homecoming
