= 1971 Northeast Louisiana Indians football team =

American college football season

1971 Northeast Louisiana Indians football
- Conference: Independent
- Record: 4–6–1
- Head coach: Dixie B. White (8th season)
- Home stadium: Brown Stadium

1971 NCAA College Division independents football records
	Conf.			Overall
Team	W	L	T	W		L		T
No. 1 Delaware		–		10	–	1	–	0
No. 5 Tennessee State		–		9	–	1	–	0
No. 2 McNeese State		–		9	–	1	–	1
Samford		–		8	–	1	–	0
Colorado College		–		7	–	1	–	0
No. 8 Akron		–		8	–	2	–	0
No. 3 Eastern Michigan		–		7	–	1	–	2
Arkansas AM&N		–		7	–	2	–	0
Indiana (PA)		–		7	–	2	–	0
Kentucky State		–		8	–	3	–	0
Appalachian State		–		7	–	3	–	1
Northern Michigan		–		7	–	3	–	0
Hawaii		–		7	–	4	–	0
Ashland		–		6	–	4	–	0
Santa Clara		–		6	–	4	–	0
Southern Illinois		–		6	–	4	–	0
Tampa		–		6	–	5	–	0
UNLV		–		5	–	4	–	1
Bucknell		–		5	–	5	–	0
Central Michigan		–		5	–	5	–	0
Milwaukee		–		5	–	5	–	0
Nevada		–		5	–	5	–	0
St. Norbert		–		5	–	5	–	0
Wayne State (MI)		–		4	–	4	–	0
Hofstra		–		5	–	6	–	0
Cortland		–		4	–	5	–	0
Northeastern		–		4	–	5	–	0
Portland State		–		4	–	5	–	0
Ball State		–		4	–	5	–	1
Chicago		–		3	–	4	–	0
Northeast Louisiana		–		4	–	6	–	1
Eastern Illinois		–		4	–	6	–	0
Indiana State		–		4	–	6	–	0
Saint Mary's		–		3	–	5	–	0
Rose-Hulman		–		3	–	6	–	0
Boston University		–		3	–	7	–	0
Drexel		–		2	–	6	–	0
Chattanooga		–		2	–	9	–	0
Rankings from AP small college poll

The 1971 Northeast Louisiana Indians football team was an American football team that represented Northeast Louisiana University (now known as the University of Louisiana at Monroe) as an independent during the 1971 NCAA College Division football season. In their eighth year under head coach Dixie B. White, the team compiled a 4–6–1 record.

== Schedule ==
Date	Opponent	Site	Result	Attendance	Source
September 11	Quantico Marines	Brown Stadium; Monroe, LA	W 19–13	7,800	
September 18	Howard Payne	Brown Stadium; Monroe, LA	L 7–24	7,600	
September 25	at Arkansas State	Kays Stadium; Jonesboro, AR	L 6–20	10,450–10,452	
October 2	at Northwestern State	Demon Stadium; Natchitoches, LA (rivalry)	W 15–14	5,000	
October 9	at Chattanooga	Chamberlain Field; Chattanooga, TN	W 27–21	2,000	
October 16	No. 4 McNeese State	Brown Stadium; Monroe, LA	L 21–31	8,000	
October 23	Southeastern Louisiana	Brown Stadium; Monroe, LA	W 3–0	8,300	
October 30	at Southwestern Louisiana	Cajun Field; Lafayette, LA (rivalry)	L 7–31	22,500	
November 6	Eastern Michigan	Brown Stadium; Monroe, LA	T 10–10	2,000	
November 13	at Troy State	Rip Hewes Stadium; Dothan, AL	L 7–21	5,500	
November 20	at Louisiana Tech	Louisiana Tech Stadium; Ruston, LA (rivalry)	L 0–23	12,400	
Rankings from AP Poll released prior to the game
