= 1971 UNLV Rebels football team =

American college football season

1971 UNLV Rebels football
- Conference: Independent
- Record: 5–4–1
- Head coach: Bill Ireland (4th season)
- Home stadium: Butcher Field; Las Vegas Stadium

1971 NCAA College Division independents football records
	Conf.			Overall
Team	W	L	T	W		L		T
No. 1 Delaware		–		10	–	1	–	0
No. 5 Tennessee State		–		9	–	1	–	0
No. 2 McNeese State		–		9	–	1	–	1
Samford		–		8	–	1	–	0
Colorado College		–		7	–	1	–	0
No. 8 Akron		–		8	–	2	–	0
No. 3 Eastern Michigan		–		7	–	1	–	2
Arkansas AM&N		–		7	–	2	–	0
Indiana (PA)		–		7	–	2	–	0
Kentucky State		–		8	–	3	–	0
Appalachian State		–		7	–	3	–	1
Northern Michigan		–		7	–	3	–	0
Hawaii		–		7	–	4	–	0
Ashland		–		6	–	4	–	0
Santa Clara		–		6	–	4	–	0
Southern Illinois		–		6	–	4	–	0
Tampa		–		6	–	5	–	0
UNLV		–		5	–	4	–	1
Bucknell		–		5	–	5	–	0
Central Michigan		–		5	–	5	–	0
Milwaukee		–		5	–	5	–	0
Nevada		–		5	–	5	–	0
St. Norbert		–		5	–	5	–	0
Wayne State (MI)		–		4	–	4	–	0
Hofstra		–		5	–	6	–	0
Cortland		–		4	–	5	–	0
Northeastern		–		4	–	5	–	0
Portland State		–		4	–	5	–	0
Ball State		–		4	–	5	–	1
Chicago		–		3	–	4	–	0
Northeast Louisiana		–		4	–	6	–	1
Eastern Illinois		–		4	–	6	–	0
Indiana State		–		4	–	6	–	0
Saint Mary's		–		3	–	5	–	0
Rose-Hulman		–		3	–	6	–	0
Boston University		–		3	–	7	–	0
Drexel		–		2	–	6	–	0
Chattanooga		–		2	–	9	–	0
Rankings from AP small college poll

The 1971 UNLV Rebels football team was an American football team that represented the University of Nevada, Las Vegas as an independent during the 1971 NCAA College Division football season. In their fourth year under head coach Bill Ireland, the team compiled a record of 5–4–1.

== Schedule ==
Date	Opponent	Site	Result	Attendance	Source
September 18	Adams State	Butcher Field; Las Vegas, NV	W 38–0	6,200	
September 25	at Utah State	Romney Stadium; Logan, UT	L 7–27	10,640	
October 9	Santa Clara	Butcher Field; Las Vegas, NV	W 23–14	6,000	
October 16	at Northern Arizona	Lumberjack Stadium; Flagstaff, AZ	L 7–20	3,000–4,500	
October 23	Weber State	Las Vegas Stadium; Whitney, NV	L 17–30	10,200	
October 30	New Mexico Highlands	Las Vegas Stadium; Whitney, NV	W 55–31	5,500	
November 6	Cal Poly	Las Vegas Stadium; Whitney, NV	L 3–13	4,762–6,500	
November 13	North Dakota	Las Vegas Stadium; Whitney, NV	T 17–17	7,600	
November 20	at Nevada	Mackay Stadium; Reno, NV (Fremont Cannon)	W 24–13	5,200–6,000	
November 27	University of Mexico	Las Vegas Stadium; Whitney, NV	W 63–6	5,400–5,500	

== After the season ==
=== NFL draft ===
The following Rebels were drafted in the 1972 NFL draft.

Round	Pick	Player	Position	NFL team
16	403	Nate Hawkins	Wide receiver	Pittsburgh Steelers
