= 1971 Ball State Cardinals football team =

American college football season

1971 Ball State Cardinals football
- Conference: Independent
- Record: 4–5–1
- Head coach: Dave McClain (1st season)
- Home stadium: Ball State Stadium

1971 NCAA College Division independents football records
	Conf.			Overall
Team	W	L	T	W		L		T
No. 1 Delaware		–		10	–	1	–	0
No. 5 Tennessee State		–		9	–	1	–	0
No. 2 McNeese State		–		9	–	1	–	1
Samford		–		8	–	1	–	0
Colorado College		–		7	–	1	–	0
No. 8 Akron		–		8	–	2	–	0
No. 3 Eastern Michigan		–		7	–	1	–	2
Arkansas AM&N		–		7	–	2	–	0
Indiana (PA)		–		7	–	2	–	0
Kentucky State		–		8	–	3	–	0
Appalachian State		–		7	–	3	–	1
Northern Michigan		–		7	–	3	–	0
Hawaii		–		7	–	4	–	0
Ashland		–		6	–	4	–	0
Santa Clara		–		6	–	4	–	0
Southern Illinois		–		6	–	4	–	0
Tampa		–		6	–	5	–	0
UNLV		–		5	–	4	–	1
Bucknell		–		5	–	5	–	0
Central Michigan		–		5	–	5	–	0
Milwaukee		–		5	–	5	–	0
Nevada		–		5	–	5	–	0
St. Norbert		–		5	–	5	–	0
Wayne State (MI)		–		4	–	4	–	0
Hofstra		–		5	–	6	–	0
Cortland		–		4	–	5	–	0
Northeastern		–		4	–	5	–	0
Portland State		–		4	–	5	–	0
Ball State		–		4	–	5	–	1
Chicago		–		3	–	4	–	0
Northeast Louisiana		–		4	–	6	–	1
Eastern Illinois		–		4	–	6	–	0
Indiana State		–		4	–	6	–	0
Saint Mary's		–		3	–	5	–	0
Rose-Hulman		–		3	–	6	–	0
Boston University		–		3	–	7	–	0
Drexel		–		2	–	6	–	0
Chattanooga		–		2	–	9	–	0
Rankings from AP small college poll

The 1971 Ball State Cardinals football team was an American football team that represented Ball State University as an independent during the 1971 NCAA College Division football season. In its first season under head coach Dave McClain, the team compiled a 4–5–1 record. The team played its home games at Ball State Stadium in Muncie, Indiana.

== Schedule ==
Date	Time	Opponent	Site	Result	Attendance	Source
September 11		Central Michigan	Ball State Stadium; Muncie, IN	W 9–6	8,100	
September 18	1:30 p.m.	Western Michigan	Ball State Stadium; Muncie, IN	L 0–9	15,950	
September 25		Butler	Ball State Stadium; Muncie, IN	W 27–0	8,575	
October 2		at Akron	Rubber Bowl; Akron, OH	L 7–10	14,150	
October 9		Indiana State	Ball State Stadium; Muncie, IN (Blue Key Victory Bell)	W 20–17	16,650	
October 16		at No. T–10 Southern Illinois	McAndrew Stadium; Carbondale, IL	L 8–33	9,500–10,000	
October 23	2:30 p.m.	at Northern Illinois	Huskie Stadium; DeKalb, IL (rivalry)	T 10–10	16,898	
October 30		at Middle Tennessee	Horace Jones Field; Murfreesboro, TN	L 7–28	10,500	
November 6		Wittenberg	Ball State Stadium; Muncie, IN	W 28–21	6,850	
November 13		at Western Illinois	Hanson Field; Macomb, IL	L 20–21	15,100	
All times are in Eastern time
