= 1971 Central Michigan Chippewas football team =

American college football season

1971 Central Michigan Chippewas football
- Conference: Independent
- Record: 5–5
- Head coach: Roy Kramer (5th season)
- Defensive coordinator: Herb Deromedi (3rd season)
- MVP: Jesse Lakes
- Home stadium: Alumni Field

1971 NCAA College Division independents football records
	Conf.			Overall
Team	W	L	T	W		L		T
No. 1 Delaware		–		10	–	1	–	0
No. 5 Tennessee State		–		9	–	1	–	0
No. 2 McNeese State		–		9	–	1	–	1
Samford		–		8	–	1	–	0
Colorado College		–		7	–	1	–	0
No. 8 Akron		–		8	–	2	–	0
No. 3 Eastern Michigan		–		7	–	1	–	2
Arkansas AM&N		–		7	–	2	–	0
Indiana (PA)		–		7	–	2	–	0
Kentucky State		–		8	–	3	–	0
Appalachian State		–		7	–	3	–	1
Northern Michigan		–		7	–	3	–	0
Hawaii		–		7	–	4	–	0
Illinois College		–		5	–	3	–	0
Ashland		–		6	–	4	–	0
Santa Clara		–		6	–	4	–	0
Southern Illinois		–		6	–	4	–	0
Tampa		–		6	–	5	–	0
UNLV		–		5	–	4	–	1
Bucknell		–		5	–	5	–	0
Central Michigan		–		5	–	5	–	0
Milwaukee		–		5	–	5	–	0
Nevada		–		5	–	5	–	0
St. Norbert		–		5	–	5	–	0
Wayne State (MI)		–		4	–	4	–	0
Hofstra		–		5	–	6	–	0
Cortland		–		4	–	5	–	0
Northeastern		–		4	–	5	–	0
Portland State		–		4	–	5	–	0
Ball State		–		4	–	5	–	1
Chicago		–		3	–	4	–	0
Northeast Louisiana		–		4	–	6	–	1
Eastern Illinois		–		4	–	6	–	0
Indiana State		–		4	–	6	–	0
Saint Mary's		–		3	–	5	–	0
Rose-Hulman		–		3	–	6	–	0
Boston University		–		3	–	7	–	0
Drexel		–		2	–	6	–	0
Chattanooga		–		2	–	9	–	0
Rankings from AP small college poll

The 1971 Central Michigan Chippewas football team represented Central Michigan University as an independent during the 1971 NCAA College Division football season. In their fifth season under head coach Roy Kramer, the Chippewas compiled a 5–5 record and outscored their opponents, 183 to 181. The team's statistical leaders included quarterback Mick Brzezinski with 426 passing yards, tailback Jesse Lakes with 1,143 rushing yards, and Ron Goodin with 186 receiving yards. Lakes received the team's most valuable player award for the second consecutive year.

== Schedule ==
Date	Opponent	Site	Result	Attendance	Source
September 11	at Ball State	Scheumann Stadium; Muncie, IN	L 6–9	8,100	
September 18	Youngstown State	Alumni Field; Mount Pleasant, MI	W 47–19		
September 25	Northern Michigan	Alumni Field; Mount Pleasant, MI	L 14–37		
October 2	at Indiana State	Memorial Stadium; Terre Haute, IN	W 21–6		
October 9	at Western Illinois	Hanson Field; Macomb, IL	L 0–28		
October 23	Eastern Illinois	Alumni Field; Mount Pleasant, MI	W 47–14	10,600	
October 30	No. 3 Akron	Alumni Field; Mount Pleasant, MI	W 10–7	7,675	
November 6	at Illinois State	Hancock Stadium; Normal, IL	L 6–13		
November 13	Hofstra	Alumni Field; Mount Pleasant, MI	W 24–13		
November 20	at Southern Illinois	McAndrew Stadium; Carbondale, IL	L 8–35	5,400	
Rankings from AP Poll released prior to the game
