= 1971 Nevada Wolf Pack football team =

American college football season

1971 Nevada Wolf Pack football
- Conference: Independent
- Record: 5–5
- Head coach: Jerry Scattini (3rd season)
- Home stadium: Mackay Stadium

1971 NCAA College Division independents football records
	Conf.			Overall
Team	W	L	T	W		L		T
No. 1 Delaware		–		10	–	1	–	0
No. 5 Tennessee State		–		9	–	1	–	0
No. 2 McNeese State		–		9	–	1	–	1
Samford		–		8	–	1	–	0
Colorado College		–		7	–	1	–	0
No. 8 Akron		–		8	–	2	–	0
No. 3 Eastern Michigan		–		7	–	1	–	2
Arkansas AM&N		–		7	–	2	–	0
Indiana (PA)		–		7	–	2	–	0
Kentucky State		–		8	–	3	–	0
Appalachian State		–		7	–	3	–	1
Northern Michigan		–		7	–	3	–	0
Hawaii		–		7	–	4	–	0
Ashland		–		6	–	4	–	0
Santa Clara		–		6	–	4	–	0
Southern Illinois		–		6	–	4	–	0
Tampa		–		6	–	5	–	0
UNLV		–		5	–	4	–	1
Bucknell		–		5	–	5	–	0
Central Michigan		–		5	–	5	–	0
Milwaukee		–		5	–	5	–	0
Nevada		–		5	–	5	–	0
St. Norbert		–		5	–	5	–	0
Wayne State (MI)		–		4	–	4	–	0
Hofstra		–		5	–	6	–	0
Cortland		–		4	–	5	–	0
Northeastern		–		4	–	5	–	0
Portland State		–		4	–	5	–	0
Ball State		–		4	–	5	–	1
Chicago		–		3	–	4	–	0
Northeast Louisiana		–		4	–	6	–	1
Eastern Illinois		–		4	–	6	–	0
Indiana State		–		4	–	6	–	0
Saint Mary's		–		3	–	5	–	0
Rose-Hulman		–		3	–	6	–	0
Boston University		–		3	–	7	–	0
Drexel		–		2	–	6	–	0
Chattanooga		–		2	–	9	–	0
Rankings from AP small college poll

The 1971 Nevada Wolf Pack football team represented the University of Nevada, Reno as an independent during the 1971 NCAA College Division football season. Led by third-year head coach Jerry Scattini, the Wolf Pack compiled a record of 5–5. The team played home games at Mackay Stadium in Reno, Nevada.

== Schedule ==
Date	Opponent	Site	Result	Attendance	Source
September 18	Oregon Tech	Mackay Stadium; Reno, NV	W 44–7	6,000	
September 25	Boise State	Mackay Stadium; Reno, NV (rivalry)	L 10–17	5,800–6,500	
October 2	at Santa Clara	Buck Shaw Stadium; Santa Clara, CA	L 7–21	6,000–9,000	
October 9	at UC Riverside	Highlander Stadium; Riverside, CA	W 23–16	1,800–3,000	
October 16	at Portland State	Civic Stadium; Portland, OR	W 23–16	6,000	
October 23	UC Davis^{†}	Mackay Stadium; Reno, NV	L 13–14	5,400–7,000	
October 30	at Idaho State	ASISU Minidome; Pocatello, ID	L 0–27	8,000–8,500	
November 6	at San Francisco	Kezar Stadium; San Francisco, CA	W 12–0	575–2,000	
November 13	at Eastern Oregon	Community Stadium; La Grande, OR	W 36–20	3,000	
November 20	UNLV	Mackay Stadium; Reno, NV (Fremont Cannon)	L 13–27	5,200–6,000	
^{†}Homecoming
