= 1971 Boston University Terriers football team =

American college football season

1971 Boston University Terriers football
- Conference: Independent
- Record: 3–7
- Head coach: Larry Naviaux (3rd season)
- Home stadium: Nickerson Field

1971 NCAA College Division independents football records
	Conf.			Overall
Team	W	L	T	W		L		T
No. 1 Delaware		–		10	–	1	–	0
No. 5 Tennessee State		–		9	–	1	–	0
No. 2 McNeese State		–		9	–	1	–	1
Samford		–		8	–	1	–	0
Colorado College		–		7	–	1	–	0
No. 8 Akron		–		8	–	2	–	0
No. 3 Eastern Michigan		–		7	–	1	–	2
Arkansas AM&N		–		7	–	2	–	0
Indiana (PA)		–		7	–	2	–	0
Kentucky State		–		8	–	3	–	0
Appalachian State		–		7	–	3	–	1
Northern Michigan		–		7	–	3	–	0
Hawaii		–		7	–	4	–	0
Illinois College		–		5	–	3	–	0
Ashland		–		6	–	4	–	0
Santa Clara		–		6	–	4	–	0
Southern Illinois		–		6	–	4	–	0
Tampa		–		6	–	5	–	0
UNLV		–		5	–	4	–	1
Bucknell		–		5	–	5	–	0
Central Michigan		–		5	–	5	–	0
Milwaukee		–		5	–	5	–	0
Nevada		–		5	–	5	–	0
St. Norbert		–		5	–	5	–	0
Wayne State (MI)		–		4	–	4	–	0
Hofstra		–		5	–	6	–	0
Cortland		–		4	–	5	–	0
Northeastern		–		4	–	5	–	0
Portland State		–		4	–	5	–	0
Ball State		–		4	–	5	–	1
Chicago		–		3	–	4	–	0
Northeast Louisiana		–		4	–	6	–	1
Eastern Illinois		–		4	–	6	–	0
Indiana State		–		4	–	6	–	0
Saint Mary's		–		3	–	5	–	0
Rose-Hulman		–		3	–	6	–	0
Boston University		–		3	–	7	–	0
Drexel		–		2	–	6	–	0
Chattanooga		–		2	–	9	–	0
Rankings from AP small college poll

The 1971 Boston University Terriers football team was an American football team that represented Boston University as an independent during the 1971 NCAA College Division football season. In their third season under head coach Larry Naviaux, the Terriers compiled a 3–7 record and were outscored by a total of 284 to 200.

== Schedule ==
Date	Time	Opponent	Site	Result	Attendance	Source
September 18		at Colgate	Andy Kerr Stadium; Hamilton, NY	L 21–27	6,000–6,085	
September 25		at The Citadel	Johnson Hagood Stadium; Charleston, SC	L 37–44	16,200	
October 2		at Temple	Temple Stadium; Philadelphia, PA	L 10–34	6,000	
October 9	1:30 p.m.	UMass	Nickerson Field; Boston, MA	W 47–21	6,100–6,110	
October 16		at Holy Cross	Fitton Field; Worcester, MA	L 14–28	17,500	
October 23		Rhode Island	Nickerson Field; Boston, MA	W 28–7	6,646	
October 29		Connecticut	Nickerson Field; Boston, MA	L 10–14	8,313	
November 6	1:30 p.m.	at Villanova	Villanova Stadium; Villanova, PA	L 0–48	13,400	
November 13		No. 1 Delaware	Nickerson Field; Boston, MA	L 0–54	2,000–4,022	
November 20		New Hampshire	Nickerson Field; Boston, MA	W 33–7	3,500–4,008	
Rankings from AP Poll released prior to the game; All times are in Eastern time
