= 1971 Bucknell Bison football team =

American college football season

1971 Bucknell Bison football
- Conference: Independent
- Record: 5–5
- Head coach: Fred Prender (3rd season)
- Captains: Joe DiOrio; John Klenovic
- Home stadium: Memorial Stadium

1971 NCAA College Division independents football records
	Conf.			Overall
Team	W	L	T	W		L		T
No. 1 Delaware		–		10	–	1	–	0
No. 5 Tennessee State		–		9	–	1	–	0
No. 2 McNeese State		–		9	–	1	–	1
Samford		–		8	–	1	–	0
Colorado College		–		7	–	1	–	0
No. 8 Akron		–		8	–	2	–	0
No. 3 Eastern Michigan		–		7	–	1	–	2
Arkansas AM&N		–		7	–	2	–	0
Indiana (PA)		–		7	–	2	–	0
Kentucky State		–		8	–	3	–	0
Appalachian State		–		7	–	3	–	1
Northern Michigan		–		7	–	3	–	0
Hawaii		–		7	–	4	–	0
Ashland		–		6	–	4	–	0
Santa Clara		–		6	–	4	–	0
Southern Illinois		–		6	–	4	–	0
Tampa		–		6	–	5	–	0
UNLV		–		5	–	4	–	1
Bucknell		–		5	–	5	–	0
Central Michigan		–		5	–	5	–	0
Milwaukee		–		5	–	5	–	0
Nevada		–		5	–	5	–	0
St. Norbert		–		5	–	5	–	0
Wayne State (MI)		–		4	–	4	–	0
Hofstra		–		5	–	6	–	0
Cortland		–		4	–	5	–	0
Northeastern		–		4	–	5	–	0
Portland State		–		4	–	5	–	0
Ball State		–		4	–	5	–	1
Chicago		–		3	–	4	–	0
Northeast Louisiana		–		4	–	6	–	1
Eastern Illinois		–		4	–	6	–	0
Indiana State		–		4	–	6	–	0
Saint Mary's		–		3	–	5	–	0
Rose-Hulman		–		3	–	6	–	0
Boston University		–		3	–	7	–	0
Drexel		–		2	–	6	–	0
Chattanooga		–		2	–	9	–	0
Rankings from AP small college poll

The 1971 Bucknell Bison football team was an American football team that represented Bucknell University as an independent during the 1971 NCAA College Division football season.

In their third year under head coach Fred Prender, the Bison compiled a 5–5 record. Joe DiOrio and John Klenovic were the team captains.

Bucknell played its home games at Memorial Stadium on the university campus in Lewisburg, Pennsylvania.

== Schedule ==
Date	Opponent	Site	Result	Attendance	Source
September 18	The Citadel	Memorial Stadium; Lewisburg, PA	L 35–38	6,000	
September 25	at Vermont	Centennial Field; Burlington, VT	W 10–6	7,200–7,500	
October 2	at Gettysburg	Musselman Stadium; Gettysburg, PA	W 14–13	1,406	
October 9	Davidson^{†}	Memorial Stadium; Lewisburg, PA	L 8–20	8,600	
October 16	Washington & Lee	Wilson Field; Lexington, VA	W 27–0	3,800	
October 23	at Lafayette	Fisher Field; Easton, PA	W 33–0	10,000–11,500	
October 30	Rutgers^	Memorial Stadium; Lewisburg, PA	W 14–13	10,400	
November 6	at Colgate*	Andy Kerr Stadium; Hamilton, NY	L 24–47	5,000	
November 13	Lehigh	Memorial Stadium; Lewisburg, PA	L 0–23	7,500	
November 20	No. 1 Delaware	Memorial Stadium; Lewisburg, PA	L 0–46	7,800	
*Non-conference game; ^{†}Homecoming; ^ Parents Weekend; Rankings from AP Poll released prior to the game
