= 1971 Hawaii Rainbows football team =

American college football season

1971 Hawaii Rainbows football
- Conference: Independent
- Record: 7–4
- Head coach: Dave Holmes (4th season)
- Home stadium: Honolulu Stadium

1971 NCAA College Division independents football records
	Conf.			Overall
Team	W	L	T	W		L		T
No. 1 Delaware		–		10	–	1	–	0
No. 5 Tennessee State		–		9	–	1	–	0
No. 2 McNeese State		–		9	–	1	–	1
Samford		–		8	–	1	–	0
Colorado College		–		7	–	1	–	0
No. 8 Akron		–		8	–	2	–	0
No. 3 Eastern Michigan		–		7	–	1	–	2
Arkansas AM&N		–		7	–	2	–	0
Indiana (PA)		–		7	–	2	–	0
Kentucky State		–		8	–	3	–	0
Appalachian State		–		7	–	3	–	1
Northern Michigan		–		7	–	3	–	0
Hawaii		–		7	–	4	–	0
Ashland		–		6	–	4	–	0
Santa Clara		–		6	–	4	–	0
Southern Illinois		–		6	–	4	–	0
Tampa		–		6	–	5	–	0
UNLV		–		5	–	4	–	1
Bucknell		–		5	–	5	–	0
Central Michigan		–		5	–	5	–	0
Milwaukee		–		5	–	5	–	0
Nevada		–		5	–	5	–	0
St. Norbert		–		5	–	5	–	0
Wayne State (MI)		–		4	–	4	–	0
Hofstra		–		5	–	6	–	0
Cortland		–		4	–	5	–	0
Northeastern		–		4	–	5	–	0
Portland State		–		4	–	5	–	0
Ball State		–		4	–	5	–	1
Chicago		–		3	–	4	–	0
Northeast Louisiana		–		4	–	6	–	1
Eastern Illinois		–		4	–	6	–	0
Indiana State		–		4	–	6	–	0
Saint Mary's		–		3	–	5	–	0
Rose-Hulman		–		3	–	6	–	0
Boston University		–		3	–	7	–	0
Drexel		–		2	–	6	–	0
Chattanooga		–		2	–	9	–	0
Rankings from AP small college poll

The 1971 Hawaii Rainbows football team represented the University of Hawaiʻi at Mānoa as an independent during the 1971 NCAA College Division football season. In their fourth season under head coach Dave Holmes, the Rainbows compiled a 7–4 record.

== Schedule ==
Date	Time	Opponent	Site	Result	Attendance	Source
September 25		Linfield	Honolulu Stadium; Honolulu, HI	W 44–6	18,132	
October 2		at Fresno State	Ratcliffe Stadium; Fresno, CA (rivalry)	L 8–19	10,500	
October 9		Cal State Los Angeles	Honolulu Stadium; Honolulu, HI	W 26–0	14,449	
October 16		Santa Clara	Honolulu Stadium; Honolulu, HI	W 32–14	15,224	
October 23		New Mexico Highlands	Honolulu Stadium; Honolulu, HI	W 28–9	14,069	
October 30		UC Santa Barbara^{†}	Honolulu Stadium; Honolulu, HI	W 23–14	12,624	
November 6	4:30 p.m.	at Pacific (CA)	Pacific Memorial Stadium; Stockton, CA	L 17–40	6,226	
November 13		Montana	Honolulu Stadium; Honolulu, HI	W 25–11	19,025	
November 20		Long Beach State	Honolulu Stadium; Honolulu, HI	L 21–46	14,510	
November 27		New Mexico	Honolulu Stadium; Honolulu, HI	W 28–21	14,792	
December 4		No. 1 Nebraska	Honolulu Stadium; Honolulu, HI	L 3–45	23,002	
^{†}Homecoming; Rankings from AP Poll released prior to the game; All times are in Hawaii–Aleutian time
