= 1971 Eastern Illinois Panthers football team =

American college football season

1971 Eastern Illinois Panthers football
- Conference: Independent
- Record: 4–6
- Head coach: Clyde Biggers (7th season)
- Home stadium: O'Brien Stadium

1971 NCAA College Division independents football records
	Conf.			Overall
Team	W	L	T	W		L		T
No. 1 Delaware		–		10	–	1	–	0
No. 5 Tennessee State		–		9	–	1	–	0
No. 2 McNeese State		–		9	–	1	–	1
Samford		–		8	–	1	–	0
Colorado College		–		7	–	1	–	0
No. 8 Akron		–		8	–	2	–	0
No. 3 Eastern Michigan		–		7	–	1	–	2
Arkansas AM&N		–		7	–	2	–	0
Indiana (PA)		–		7	–	2	–	0
Kentucky State		–		8	–	3	–	0
Appalachian State		–		7	–	3	–	1
Northern Michigan		–		7	–	3	–	0
Hawaii		–		7	–	4	–	0
Illinois College		–		5	–	3	–	0
Ashland		–		6	–	4	–	0
Santa Clara		–		6	–	4	–	0
Southern Illinois		–		6	–	4	–	0
Tampa		–		6	–	5	–	0
UNLV		–		5	–	4	–	1
Bucknell		–		5	–	5	–	0
Central Michigan		–		5	–	5	–	0
Milwaukee		–		5	–	5	–	0
Nevada		–		5	–	5	–	0
St. Norbert		–		5	–	5	–	0
Wayne State (MI)		–		4	–	4	–	0
Hofstra		–		5	–	6	–	0
Cortland		–		4	–	5	–	0
Northeastern		–		4	–	5	–	0
Portland State		–		4	–	5	–	0
Ball State		–		4	–	5	–	1
Chicago		–		3	–	4	–	0
Northeast Louisiana		–		4	–	6	–	1
Eastern Illinois		–		4	–	6	–	0
Indiana State		–		4	–	6	–	0
Saint Mary's		–		3	–	5	–	0
Rose-Hulman		–		3	–	6	–	0
Boston University		–		3	–	7	–	0
Drexel		–		2	–	6	–	0
Chattanooga		–		2	–	9	–	0
Rankings from AP small college poll

The 1971 Eastern Illinois Panthers football team represented Eastern Illinois University as an independent during the 1971 NCAA College Division football season. The Panthers played their home games at O'Brien Stadium in Charleston, Illinois.

== Schedule ==
Date	Opponent	Site	Result	Attendance	Source
September 11	Wisconsin–Stevens Point	O'Brien Stadium; Charleston, IL	W 27–10	7,200	
September 18	at Indiana State	Memorial Stadium; Terre Haute, IN	L 7–28	10,938	
September 25	at Milwaukee	Whitefish Bay Stadium; Whitefish Bay, WI	L 19–22	1,347	
October 2	Chicago Circle	O'Brien Stadium; Charleston, IL	W 43–21	6,900	
October 9	at Illinois State	Hancock Stadium; Normal, IL (rivalry)	L 6–17	14,000	
October 16	Evansville	O'Brien Stadium; Charleston, IL	W 19–14	2,800	
October 23	at Central Michigan	Alumni Field; Mount Pleasant, MI	L 14–47	10,600	
October 30	Southwest Missouri State	O'Brien Stadium; Charleston, IL	W 32–21	8,800	
November 6	Western Illinois	O'Brien Stadium; Charleston, IL	L 6–14	3,100	
November 13	at Central Missouri State	Audrey J. Walton Stadium; Warrensburg, MO	L 7–24		
