= 1971 Southern Illinois Salukis football team =

American college football season

1971 Southern Illinois Salukis football
- Conference: Independent
- Record: 6–4
- Head coach: Dick Towers (5th season)
- Home stadium: McAndrew Stadium

1971 NCAA College Division independents football records
	Conf.			Overall
Team	W	L	T	W		L		T
No. 1 Delaware		–		10	–	1	–	0
No. 5 Tennessee State		–		9	–	1	–	0
No. 2 McNeese State		–		9	–	1	–	1
Samford		–		8	–	1	–	0
Colorado College		–		7	–	1	–	0
No. 8 Akron		–		8	–	2	–	0
No. 3 Eastern Michigan		–		7	–	1	–	2
Arkansas AM&N		–		7	–	2	–	0
Indiana (PA)		–		7	–	2	–	0
Kentucky State		–		8	–	3	–	0
Appalachian State		–		7	–	3	–	1
Northern Michigan		–		7	–	3	–	0
Hawaii		–		7	–	4	–	0
Illinois College		–		5	–	3	–	0
Ashland		–		6	–	4	–	0
Santa Clara		–		6	–	4	–	0
Southern Illinois		–		6	–	4	–	0
Tampa		–		6	–	5	–	0
UNLV		–		5	–	4	–	1
Bucknell		–		5	–	5	–	0
Central Michigan		–		5	–	5	–	0
Milwaukee		–		5	–	5	–	0
Nevada		–		5	–	5	–	0
St. Norbert		–		5	–	5	–	0
Wayne State (MI)		–		4	–	4	–	0
Hofstra		–		5	–	6	–	0
Cortland		–		4	–	5	–	0
Northeastern		–		4	–	5	–	0
Portland State		–		4	–	5	–	0
Ball State		–		4	–	5	–	1
Chicago		–		3	–	4	–	0
Northeast Louisiana		–		4	–	6	–	1
Eastern Illinois		–		4	–	6	–	0
Indiana State		–		4	–	6	–	0
Saint Mary's		–		3	–	5	–	0
Rose-Hulman		–		3	–	6	–	0
Boston University		–		3	–	7	–	0
Drexel		–		2	–	6	–	0
Chattanooga		–		2	–	9	–	0
Rankings from AP small college poll

The 1971 Southern Illinois Salukis football team was an American football team that represented Southern Illinois University (now known as Southern Illinois University Carbondale) as an independent during the 1971 NCAA College Division football season. Under fifth-year head coach Dick Towers, the team compiled a 6–4 record. The team played its home games at McAndrew Stadium in Carbondale, Illinois.

== Schedule ==
Date	Time	Opponent	Rank	Site	Result	Attendance	Source
September 18		at Dayton		Baujan Field; Dayton, OH	W 31–14	11,342	
September 25		at Illinois State	No. T–9	Hancock Stadium; Normal, IL	W 10–9	7,000	
October 2	7:30 p.m.	Wichita State		McAndrew Stadium; Carbondale, IL	L 24–26	10,500	
October 9		No. 2 Arkansas State		McAndrew Stadium; Carbondale, IL	W 21–14	10,200	
October 16		Ball State	No. T–10	McAndrew Stadium; Carbondale, IL	W 33–8	9,500–10,000	
October 23		at No. 4 Akron	No. 8	Rubber Bowl; Akron, OH	L 21–43	15,500–16,138	
October 30		at Indiana State		Memorial Stadium; Terre Haute, IN	L 3–17	6,500	
November 6		Drake		McAndrew Stadium; Carbondale, IL	W 34–32	9,500	
November 13	1:00 p.m.	at Louisville		Fairgrounds Stadium; Louisville, KY	L 14–24	10,100	
November 20		Central Michigan		McAndrew Stadium; Carbondale, IL	W 35–8	5,400	
Rankings from AP Poll released prior to the game; All times are in Central time
