= 1971 Delaware Fightin' Blue Hens football team =

American college football season

1971 Delaware Fightin' Blue Hens football

AP small college national champion; UPI small college national champion; Boardwalk Bowl champion

Boardwalk Bowl, W 72–22 vs. C.W. Post
- Conference: Independent
- Record: 10–1
- Head coach: Tubby Raymond (6th season)
- Offensive coordinator: Ted Kempski (4th season)
- Offensive scheme: Delaware Wing-T
- Base defense: 5–2
- Home stadium: Delaware Stadium

1971 NCAA College Division independents football records
	Conf.			Overall
Team	W	L	T	W		L		T
No. 1 Delaware		–		10	–	1	–	0
No. 5 Tennessee State		–		9	–	1	–	0
No. 2 McNeese State		–		9	–	1	–	1
Samford		–		8	–	1	–	0
Colorado College		–		7	–	1	–	0
No. 8 Akron		–		8	–	2	–	0
No. 3 Eastern Michigan		–		7	–	1	–	2
Arkansas AM&N		–		7	–	2	–	0
Indiana (PA)		–		7	–	2	–	0
Kentucky State		–		8	–	3	–	0
Appalachian State		–		7	–	3	–	1
Northern Michigan		–		7	–	3	–	0
Hawaii		–		7	–	4	–	0
Illinois College		–		5	–	3	–	0
Ashland		–		6	–	4	–	0
Santa Clara		–		6	–	4	–	0
Southern Illinois		–		6	–	4	–	0
Tampa		–		6	–	5	–	0
UNLV		–		5	–	4	–	1
Bucknell		–		5	–	5	–	0
Central Michigan		–		5	–	5	–	0
Milwaukee		–		5	–	5	–	0
Nevada		–		5	–	5	–	0
St. Norbert		–		5	–	5	–	0
Wayne State (MI)		–		4	–	4	–	0
Hofstra		–		5	–	6	–	0
Cortland		–		4	–	5	–	0
Northeastern		–		4	–	5	–	0
Portland State		–		4	–	5	–	0
Ball State		–		4	–	5	–	1
Chicago		–		3	–	4	–	0
Northeast Louisiana		–		4	–	6	–	1
Eastern Illinois		–		4	–	6	–	0
Indiana State		–		4	–	6	–	0
Saint Mary's		–		3	–	5	–	0
Rose-Hulman		–		3	–	6	–	0
Boston University		–		3	–	7	–	0
Drexel		–		2	–	6	–	0
Chattanooga		–		2	–	9	–	0
Rankings from AP small college poll

The 1971 Delaware Fightin' Blue Hens football team was an American football team that represented the University of Delaware as an independent during the 1971 NCAA College Division football season. In their sixth season under head coach Tubby Raymond, the team compiled a 10–1 record and was voted No. 1 in the AP and UPI small college polls. The season concluded with a 72–22 victory over C.W. Post in the Boardwalk Bowl.

The Blue Hens were the top-ranked small-college team in both total offense (515.6 yards per game) and rushing (371.2 yards per game). Their average of 42.2 yards per game ranked second to Michigan Tech. Running back Gardy Kahoe led the team with 1,216 rushing yards and 23 touchdowns in the regular season. He added 112 rushing yards in the Boradwalk Bowl. Quarterback Sam Neff led the team in passing with 1,177 passing yards.

Kahoe was also selected as a first-team player on the 1971 Little All-America college football team. Kahoe and defensive back John Bush were both selected as first-team players on the Eastern College Athletic Conference Division II All-Star team.

The team played its home games at Delaware Stadium in Newark, Delaware. Ralph Borgess was the team captain.

== Schedule ==
Date	Time	Opponent	Rank	Site	Result	Attendance	Source
September 18		Gettysburg	No. 7	Delaware Stadium; Newark, DE	W 30–8	15,414	
September 25		at New Hampshire	No. 6	Cowell Stadium; Durham, NH	W 40–7	10,458	
October 2	1:30 p.m.	Villanova	No. 4	Delaware Stadium; Newark, DE (rivalry)	W 23–15	20,284	
October 9		at Lafayette	No. 3	Fisher Field; Easton, PA	W 49–0	11,000–12,000	
October 16		Rutgers	No. 1	Delaware Stadium; Newark, DE	W 48–7	16,709	
October 23		West Chester	No. 1	Delaware Stadium; Newark, DE (rivalry)	W 47–8	17,648	
October 30		Temple	No. 1	Delaware Stadium; Newark, DE	L 27–32	22,582	
November 6		Lehigh	No. 3	Delaware Stadium; Newark, DE (rivalry)	W 49–22	21,191	
November 13		at Boston University	No. 1	Nickerson Field; Boston, MA	W 54–0	2,000–4,022	
November 20		at Bucknell	No. 1	Christy Mathewson–Memorial Stadium; Lewisburg, PA	W 46–0	7,800	
December 11		vs. C.W. Post	No. 1	Atlantic City Convention Center; Atlantic City, NJ (Boardwalk Bowl)	W 72–22	10,614	
Rankings from AP Poll released prior to the game; All times are in Eastern time
