= 1971 Akron Zips football team =

American college football season

1971 Akron Zips football
- Conference: Independent
- Record: 8–2
- Head coach: Gordon K. Larson (11th season)
- Captain: Mike Hatch
- Home stadium: Rubber Bowl

1971 NCAA College Division independents football records
	Conf.			Overall
Team	W	L	T	W		L		T
No. 1 Delaware		–		10	–	1	–	0
No. 5 Tennessee State		–		9	–	1	–	0
No. 2 McNeese State		–		9	–	1	–	1
Samford		–		8	–	1	–	0
Colorado College		–		7	–	1	–	0
No. 8 Akron		–		8	–	2	–	0
No. 3 Eastern Michigan		–		7	–	1	–	2
Arkansas AM&N		–		7	–	2	–	0
Indiana (PA)		–		7	–	2	–	0
Kentucky State		–		8	–	3	–	0
Appalachian State		–		7	–	3	–	1
Northern Michigan		–		7	–	3	–	0
Hawaii		–		7	–	4	–	0
Illinois College		–		5	–	3	–	0
Ashland		–		6	–	4	–	0
Santa Clara		–		6	–	4	–	0
Southern Illinois		–		6	–	4	–	0
Tampa		–		6	–	5	–	0
UNLV		–		5	–	4	–	1
Bucknell		–		5	–	5	–	0
Central Michigan		–		5	–	5	–	0
Milwaukee		–		5	–	5	–	0
Nevada		–		5	–	5	–	0
St. Norbert		–		5	–	5	–	0
Wayne State (MI)		–		4	–	4	–	0
Hofstra		–		5	–	6	–	0
Cortland		–		4	–	5	–	0
Northeastern		–		4	–	5	–	0
Portland State		–		4	–	5	–	0
Ball State		–		4	–	5	–	1
Chicago		–		3	–	4	–	0
Northeast Louisiana		–		4	–	6	–	1
Eastern Illinois		–		4	–	6	–	0
Indiana State		–		4	–	6	–	0
Saint Mary's		–		3	–	5	–	0
Rose-Hulman		–		3	–	6	–	0
Boston University		–		3	–	7	–	0
Drexel		–		2	–	6	–	0
Chattanooga		–		2	–	9	–	0
Rankings from AP small college poll

The 1971 Akron Zips football team represented Akron University in the 1971 NCAA College Division football season as an independent. Led by 11th-year head coach Gordon K. Larson, the Zips played their home games at the Rubber Bowl in Akron, Ohio. They finished the season with a record of 8–2 and outscored their opponents 193–119.

== Schedule ==
Date	Time	Opponent	Rank	Site	Result	Attendance	Source
September 18		Butler		Rubber Bowl; Akron, OH	W 24–0	43,171	
September 25		Western Illinois	No. 12	Rubber Bowl; Akron, OH	W 14–7	7,136	
October 2		Ball State		Rubber Bowl; Akron, OH	W 10–7	14,150	
October 9	8:30 p.m.	at North Texas State	No. 9	Fouts Field; Denton, TX	W 20–6	5,000	
October 16		at Northern Michigan	No. 5	Memorial Field; Marquette, MI	W 24–17	8,000	
October 23		No. 8 Southern Illinois	No. 4	Rubber Bowl; Akron, OH	W 43–21	15,500–16,138	
October 30		at Central Michigan	No. 3	Perry Shorts Stadium; Mount Pleasant, MI	L 7–10	7,675	
November 6		at Indiana State	No. 8	Memorial Stadium; Terre Haute, IN	L 10–37	5,036	
November 13		IUP	No. 10	Rubber Bowl; Akron, OH	W 34–14	8,180	
November 20		Youngstown State	No. 7	Rubber Bowl; Akron, OH (Steel Tire)	W 7–0	4,202	
Rankings from AP Poll released prior to the game; All times are in Eastern time
