= 1971 Tampa Spartans football team =

American college football season

1971 Tampa Spartans football
- Conference: Independent
- Record: 6–5
- Head coach: Bill Fulcher (1st season)
- Home stadium: Tampa Stadium

1971 NCAA College Division independents football records
	Conf.			Overall
Team	W	L	T	W		L		T
No. 1 Delaware		–		10	–	1	–	0
No. 5 Tennessee State		–		9	–	1	–	0
No. 2 McNeese State		–		9	–	1	–	1
Samford		–		8	–	1	–	0
Colorado College		–		7	–	1	–	0
No. 8 Akron		–		8	–	2	–	0
No. 3 Eastern Michigan		–		7	–	1	–	2
Arkansas AM&N		–		7	–	2	–	0
Indiana (PA)		–		7	–	2	–	0
Kentucky State		–		8	–	3	–	0
Appalachian State		–		7	–	3	–	1
Northern Michigan		–		7	–	3	–	0
Hawaii		–		7	–	4	–	0
Ashland		–		6	–	4	–	0
Santa Clara		–		6	–	4	–	0
Southern Illinois		–		6	–	4	–	0
Tampa		–		6	–	5	–	0
UNLV		–		5	–	4	–	1
Bucknell		–		5	–	5	–	0
Central Michigan		–		5	–	5	–	0
Milwaukee		–		5	–	5	–	0
Nevada		–		5	–	5	–	0
St. Norbert		–		5	–	5	–	0
Wayne State (MI)		–		4	–	4	–	0
Hofstra		–		5	–	6	–	0
Cortland		–		4	–	5	–	0
Northeastern		–		4	–	5	–	0
Portland State		–		4	–	5	–	0
Ball State		–		4	–	5	–	1
Chicago		–		3	–	4	–	0
Northeast Louisiana		–		4	–	6	–	1
Eastern Illinois		–		4	–	6	–	0
Indiana State		–		4	–	6	–	0
Saint Mary's		–		3	–	5	–	0
Rose-Hulman		–		3	–	6	–	0
Boston University		–		3	–	7	–	0
Drexel		–		2	–	6	–	0
Chattanooga		–		2	–	9	–	0
Rankings from AP small college poll

The 1971 Tampa Spartans football team represented the University of Tampa in the 1971 NCAA College Division football season. It was the Spartans' 35th season. The team was led by head coach Bill Fulcher, in his first year, and played their home games at Tampa Stadium in Tampa, Florida. They finished with a record of six wins and five losses (6–5). Fulcher was hired on January 7, 1971, to serve as the replacement for Fran Curci who resigned to become the head coach at Miami.

After an upset loss against Louisiana Tech to open the season, the Spartans won four consecutive games against Chattanooga, Youngstown State, Dayton and Drake. Ranked No. 2 as they entered their game against Villanova, Tampa was upset by the Wildcats 24–3. After the loss, the Spartans would lose three of their next four games. A week after their loss at Louisville, Tampa returned home and lost to Ole Miss by a single point in a game that saw the Spartans score on touchdown passes of 93 and 49 yards. Tampa then rebounded the next week with a 43–7 win over East Carolina. The Spartans then closed the season with a loss at Vanderbilt and a victory over Florida A&M. On January 21, 1972, Fulcher resigned as head coach of the Spartans to take the same position at Georgia Tech.

== Schedule ==
Date	Time	Opponent	Rank	Site	Result	Attendance	Source
September 18		Louisiana Tech		Tampa Stadium; Tampa, Fl	L 20–28	27,333	
September 25		at Chattanooga	No. 13	Chamberlain Field; Chattanooga, TN	W 31–14	10,000–10,205	
October 2		Youngstown State		Tampa Stadium; Tampa, FL	W 49–0	15,147	
October 9		Dayton		Tampa Stadium; Tampa, FL	W 47–14	18,031	
October 16		at Drake	No. 8	Drake Stadium; Des Moines, IA	W 36–2	15,200	
October 23	8:00 p.m.	Villanova	No. 6	Tampa Stadium; Tampa, FL	L 3–24	27,397	
October 30	7:30 p.m.	at Louisville	No. 10	Fairgrounds Stadium; Louisville, KY	L 10–21	17,341	
November 6		Ole Miss		Tampa Stadium; Tampa, FL	L 27–28	20,559–20,959	
November 13		East Carolina^{†}		Tampa Stadium; Tampa, FL	W 43–7	17,092–17,902	
November 20		at Vanderbilt		Dudley Field; Nashville, TN	L 7–10	9,977–12,000	
November 27		Florida A&M		Tampa Stadium; Tampa, FL	W 56–14	37,112	
^{†}Homecoming; Rankings from AP Poll released prior to the game; All times are in Eastern time
