= Wayne State Tartars football, 1970–1979 =

American college football season

1970–1979 Wayne State Tartars football
- Conference: Great Lakes Intercollegiate Athletic Conference
- Head coach: Vernon Gale (1965–1971); Dave Hoover (1972–1973); Dick Lowry (1974–1979)
- Home stadium: Wayne State Stadium

The Wayne State Tartars football program, 1970–1979 represented Wayne State University during the 1970s as an independent from 1970 to 1974 and as a member of the Great Lakes Intercollegiate Athletic Conference (GLIAC) from 1975 to 1979. The team was led by three head coaches during the decade: Vernon Gale (1965–1971); Dave Hoover (1972–1973); and Dick Lowry (1974–1979).

The team played its home games at Wayne State Stadium, sometimes referenced as WSU Stadium, in Detroit.

== 1970 ==
1970 Wayne State Tartars football
- Conference: Independent
- Record: 6–2
- Head coach: Vernon Gale (6th season)
- Captains: Tom Bomberski; Tom Sheppard
- Home stadium: Wayne State Stadium

1970 NCAA College Division independents football records
	Conf.			Overall
Team	W	L	T	W		L		T
No. 4 Tampa		–		10	–	1	–	0
No. 5 Tennessee State		–		10	–	0	–	0
No. 11 Delaware		–		9	–	2	–	0
Hawaii		–		9	–	2	–	0
Northern Michigan		–		8	–	2	–	0
No. 19 Eastern Michigan		–		7	–	2	–	1
Mankato State		–		7	–	2	–	1
Akron		–		7	–	3	–	0
Central Michigan		–		7	–	3	–	0
Temple		–		7	–	3	–	0
Drake		–		7	–	4	–	0
Wayne State (MI)		–		6	–	2	–	0
Arkansas AM&N		–		6	–	3	–	0
Southern Illinois		–		6	–	3	–	0
St. Norbert		–		6	–	3	–	0
Nevada		–		6	–	3	–	1
Portland State		–		6	–	4	–	0
UNLV		–		6	–	4	–	0
Boston University		–		5	–	4	–	0
Cortland		–		5	–	4	–	0
Indiana (PA)		–		5	–	4	–	0
Santa Clara		–		5	–	4	–	1
Lafayette		–		6	–	5	–	0
Colorado College		–		4	–	4	–	0
Drexel		–		4	–	4	–	0
Hofstra		–		5	–	5	–	0
Indiana State		–		5	–	5	–	0
Samford		–		5	–	5	–	0
Wabash		–		3	–	3	–	2
Saint Mary's		–		3	–	4	–	0
Ashland		–		4	–	6	–	0
Bucknell		–		4	–	6	–	0
Lehigh		–		4	–	6	–	0
Rose Poly		–		3	–	5	–	1
Illinois College		–		3	–	5	–	0
Northeastern		–		3	–	5	–	0
Indiana Central		–		3	–	6	–	0
Lake Forest		–		3	–	6	–	0
Kentucky State		–		3	–	6	–	0
Chicago		–		2	–	5	–	0
Chattanooga		–		3	–	8	–	0
Parsons		–		2	–	7	–	0
Eastern Illinois		–		2	–	8	–	0
Milwaukee		–		1	–	9	–	0
Rankings from AP small college poll

The 1970 Wayne State Tartars football team represented Wayne State University as an independent during the 1970 NCAA College Division football season. In their sixth year under head coach Vernon Gale, the Tartars compiled a 6–2 record and outscored opponents by a total of 156 to 109.

Although classes did not begin until October 1, the team began training camp on September 3. Before the season began, the university began a review of the football program and its future. Coach Gale hinted at the time that 1970 may be his last as head football coach at Wayne.

The team's statistical leaders included Gary Rossi with 914 passing yards, Terry Fuller with 451 receiving yards, George Crayton with 206 rushing yards, Rossi set a school record with 35 pass attempts against Hillsdale on November 21. Tom Bomberski and Tom Sheppard were the team captains.

=== Schedule ===
Date	Opponent	Site	Result	Attendance	Source
September 26	Ferris State	Tartar Field; Drtroit, MI	W 24–7		
October 3	South Dakota State^{†}	Tartar Field; Detroit, MI	W 21–12	4,242	
October 10	at Bradley	Peoria, IL	W 34–17	1,100	
October 24	at Parsons	Blum Stadium; Fairfield, IA	L 8–10		
October 31	at Chicago Circle	Soldier Field; Chicago, IL	W 24–8		
November 7	Kalamazoo	Tartar Field; Detroit, MI	W 33–10	2,841	
November 14	at Central State (OH)	Tartar Field; Detroit, MI	W 12–6		
November 21	Hillsdale	Tartar Field; Detroit, MI	L 0–39	2,677	
^{†}Homecoming

== 1971 ==
1971 Wayne State Tartars football
- Conference: Independent
- Record: 4–4
- Head coach: Vernon Gale (7th season)
- Home stadium: Wayne State Stadium

1971 NCAA College Division independents football records
	Conf.			Overall
Team	W	L	T	W		L		T
No. 1 Delaware		–		10	–	1	–	0
No. 5 Tennessee State		–		9	–	1	–	0
No. 2 McNeese State		–		9	–	1	–	1
Samford		–		8	–	1	–	0
Colorado College		–		7	–	1	–	0
No. 8 Akron		–		8	–	2	–	0
No. 3 Eastern Michigan		–		7	–	1	–	2
Arkansas AM&N		–		7	–	2	–	0
Indiana (PA)		–		7	–	2	–	0
Kentucky State		–		8	–	3	–	0
Appalachian State		–		7	–	3	–	1
Northern Michigan		–		7	–	3	–	0
Hawaii		–		7	–	4	–	0
Illinois College		–		5	–	3	–	0
Ashland		–		6	–	4	–	0
Santa Clara		–		6	–	4	–	0
Southern Illinois		–		6	–	4	–	0
Tampa		–		6	–	5	–	0
UNLV		–		5	–	4	–	1
Bucknell		–		5	–	5	–	0
Central Michigan		–		5	–	5	–	0
Milwaukee		–		5	–	5	–	0
Nevada		–		5	–	5	–	0
St. Norbert		–		5	–	5	–	0
Wayne State (MI)		–		4	–	4	–	0
Hofstra		–		5	–	6	–	0
Cortland		–		4	–	5	–	0
Northeastern		–		4	–	5	–	0
Portland State		–		4	–	5	–	0
Ball State		–		4	–	5	–	1
Chicago		–		3	–	4	–	0
Northeast Louisiana		–		4	–	6	–	1
Eastern Illinois		–		4	–	6	–	0
Indiana State		–		4	–	6	–	0
Saint Mary's		–		3	–	5	–	0
Rose-Hulman		–		3	–	6	–	0
Boston University		–		3	–	7	–	0
Drexel		–		2	–	6	–	0
Chattanooga		–		2	–	9	–	0
Rankings from AP small college poll

The 1971 Wayne State Tartars football team represented Wayne State University as an independent during the 1971 NCAA College Division football season. In their seventh and final year under head coach Vernon Gale, the Tartars compiled a 4–4 record and outscored opponents by a total of 134 to 66.

=== Schedule ===
Date	Opponent	Site	Result	Attendance	Source
September 25	at Ferris State	Top Taggart Field; Big Rapids, MI	W 34–6	6,000	
October 2	at South Dakota State	Alumni Stadium; Brookings, SD	W 27–8	3,500	
October 9	at Northeast Missouri State	Stokes Stadium; Kirksville, MO	L 6–14	3,000	
October 16	Hofstra	Detroit, MI	L 7–10	5,511	
October 30	Chicago Circle	Wayne Stadium; Detroit, MI	W 37–0	1,541	
November 6	Milwaukee	Detroit, MI	L 0–7	1,000	
November 13	Central State (OH)	Detroit, MI	W 14–21	1,757	
November 20	at Hillsdale	Hillsdale, MI	W 9–0	2,500	

== 1972 ==
1972 Wayne State Tartars football
- Conference: Independent
- Record: 2–5–1
- Head coach: Dave Hoover (1st season)
- Home stadium: Wayne State Stadium

1972 NCAA College Division independents football records
	Conf.			Overall
Team	W	L	T	W		L		T
No. 4 Ashland		–		11	–	0	–	0
Bridgeport		–		11	–	0	–	0
No. 1 Delaware		–		10	–	0	–	0
No. 5 Tennessee State		–		11	–	1	–	0
Colorado College		–		8	–	1	–	0
Tampa		–		10	–	2	–	0
Trinity (TX)		–		8	–	2	–	0
Western Carolina		–		7	–	2	–	1
Hawaii		–		8	–	3	–	0
Indiana State		–		7	–	3	–	0
Northeastern		–		6	–	2	–	0
Bucknell		–		6	–	3	–	0
Cortland		–		6	–	3	–	0
San Diego		–		6	–	3	–	1
Arkansas–Pine Bluff		–		4	–	2	–	1
Eastern Michigan		–		6	–	4	–	0
Milwaukee		–		6	–	4	–	0
Samford		–		5	–	3	–	2
Ball State		–		5	–	4	–	1
Lake Forest		–		4	–	3	–	1
Nevada		–		6	–	5	–	0
Central Michigan		–		5	–	5	–	1
Rose-Hulman		–		5	–	5	–	0
Santa Clara		–		4	–	4	–	1
Akron		–		3	–	4	–	2
St. Norbert		–		4	–	5	–	0
Saint Mary's		–		3	–	4	–	0
Kentucky State		–		4	–	6	–	0
Drexel		–		3	–	6	–	0
Northeast Louisiana		–		3	–	7	–	0
Portland State		–		3	–	8	–	0
Wayne State (MI)		–		2	–	5	–	1
Boston University		–		2	–	8	–	0
Northern Michigan		–		2	–	8	–	0
Saint Peter's		–		2	–	8	–	0
Chattanooga		–		2	–	9	–	0
Southern Illinois		–		1	–	8	–	1
Illinois College		–		1	–	8	–	0
Eastern Illinois		–		1	–	9	–	0
Madison		–		0	–	4	–	1
UNLV		–		1	–	10	–	0
Rankings from AP small college poll

The 1972 Wayne State Tartars football team represented Wayne State University as an independent during the 1972 NCAA College Division football season. In their first year under head coach Dave Hoover, the Tartars compiled a 2–5–1 record and were outscored by a total of 190 to 99.

=== Schedule ===
Date	Opponent	Site	Result	Attendance	Source
September 23	Central State (OH)	Detroit, MI	W 17–7		
September 30	at Hillsdale	Hillsdale, MI	L 12–45		
October 7	Northeast Missouri State	Detroit, MI	L 0–44		
October 14	Ferris State	Detroit, MI	L 13–24		
October 21	at Hofstra	Hempstead, NY	L 2–28		
October 28	at Chicago Circle	Soldier Field; Chicago, IL	W 34–0	250	
November 4	at Milwaukee	Shorewood Stadium; Shorewood, WI	L 7–28		
November 11	Saint Joseph's (IN)	Detroit, MI	T 14–14		

== 1973 ==
1973 Wayne State Tartars football
- Conference: Independent
- Record: 5–5
- Head coach: Dave Hoover (2nd season)
- Home stadium: Wayne Stadium Stadium

1973 NCAA Division II independents football records
	Conf.			Overall
Team	W	L	T	W		L		T
No. 1 Tennessee State		–		10	–	0	–	0
No. 9 Hawaii		–		9	–	2	–	0
Nebraska–Omaha		–		7	–	2	–	1
Trinity (TX)		–		8	–	3	–	0
UNLV		–		8	–	3	–	0
No. 13 Delaware ^		–		8	–	4	–	0
Western Carolina		–		6	–	3	–	1
Central Michigan		–		7	–	4	–	0
Nevada		–		7	–	4	–	0
Western Illinois		–		7	–	4	–	0
Milwaukee		–		6	–	4	–	1
Eastern Michigan		–		6	–	4	–	0
American International		–		5	–	4	–	0
Akron		–		6	–	5	–	0
Central State (OH)		–		6	–	5	–	0
Ball State		–		5	–	5	–	1
Wayne State (MI)		–		5	–	5	–	0
Drexel		–		4	–	4	–	0
Bucknell		–		3	–	4	–	2
Northeast Louisiana		–		3	–	5	–	2
Santa Clara		–		4	–	6	–	0
Youngstown State		–		4	–	6	–	0
Arkansas–Pine Bluff		–		3	–	5	–	1
Chattanooga		–		4	–	7	–	0
Indiana State		–		4	–	7	–	0
Northeastern		–		3	–	6	–	0
Kentucky State		–		3	–	8	–	0
Northern Michigan		–		2	–	7	–	1
Illinois College		–		2	–	7	–	0
Eastern Illinois		–		2	–	9	–	0
Portland State		–		1	–	10	–	0
^ – NCAA Division II playoff participant; Rankings from AP small college poll

The 1973 Wayne State Tartars football team represented Wayne State University as an independent during the 1973 NCAA Division II football season. In their second and final year under head coach Dave Hoover, the Tartars compiled a 5–5 record and outscored opponents by a total of 156 to 145.

=== Schedule ===
Date	Opponent	Site	Result	Attendance	Source
September 15	Valparaiso	Detroit, MI	W 19–17	2,681	
September 22	at Saint Joseph's (IN)	Rennselaer, IN	W 21–13	2,250	
September 29	Illinois Benedictine	Detroit, MI	L 14–26	1,550	
October 6	at Indiana Central	Indianapolis, IN	L 6–7	2,500	
October 13	at Ferris State	Big Rapids, MI	L 7–28	10,200	
October 20	Hofstra	Detroit, MI	L 6–9	3,563	
October 27	Chicago Circle	Wayne Stadium; Detroit, MI	W 46–14	3,000	
November 3	at Eastern Illinois	O'Brien Stadium; Charleston, IL	W 14–10	2,500	
November 10	Hillsdale	Detroit, MI	L 0–7	2,000	
November 17	at Kentucky State	Alumni Field; Frankfort, KY	W 23–14	1,600	

== 1974 ==
1974 Wayne State Tartars football
- Conference: Independent
- Record: 7–3
- Head coach: Dick Lowry (1st season)
- Defensive coordinator: Dick Tressel (1st season)
- Captains: Virgil Seal; Doug Webber
- Home stadium: Wayne State Stadium

1974 NCAA Division II independents football records
	Conf.			Overall
Team	W	L	T	W		L		T
No. 1 Central Michigan ^		–		12	–	1	–	0
No. 6 UNLV ^		–		12	–	1	–	0
No. 4 Delaware ^		–		12	–	2	–	0
No. 8 Western Carolina ^		–		9	–	2	–	0
No. 9 Tennessee State		–		8	–	2	–	0
No. 12 Youngstown State ^		–		8	–	2	–	0
Santa Clara		–		7	–	3	–	0
Wayne State (MI)		–		7	–	3	–	0
Ball State		–		6	–	4	–	0
Kentucky State		–		6	–	4	–	0
Northeastern		–		6	–	4	–	0
Central State (OH)		–		6	–	5	–	0
Akron		–		5	–	5	–	0
Illinois College		–		4	–	4	–	0
Indiana State		–		5	–	5	–	0
Nevada		–		5	–	6	–	0
Portland State		–		5	–	6	–	0
American International		–		4	–	5	–	0
Eastern Michigan		–		4	–	6	–	1
Milwaukee		–		4	–	6	–	0
Northeast Louisiana		–		4	–	6	–	0
Eastern Illinois		–		3	–	6	–	1
Arkansas–Pine Bluff		–		3	–	5	–	0
Chattanooga		–		4	–	7	–	0
Nebraska–Omaha		–		3	–	7	–	0
Bucknell		–		2	–	8	–	0
Northern Michigan		–		0	–	10	–	0
^ – NCAA Division II playoff participant; Rankings from AP small college poll

The 1974 Wayne State Tartars football team represented Wayne State University as an independent during the 1974 NCAA Division II football season. In their first year under head coach Dick Lowry, the Tartars compiled a 7–3 record and were outscored by a total of 198 to 186.

=== Schedule ===
Date	Opponent	Site	Result	Attendance	Source
September 14	at Butler	Indianapolis, IN	L 14–21	4,654	
September 21	Saint Joseph's (IN)	Wayne State Stadium; Detroit, MI	W 8–6	2,874	
September 28	at Illinois Benedictine	Lisle, IL	W 34–32	2,000	
October 5	at Valparaiso	Brown Field; Valparaiso, IN	W 26–21	3,053	
October 12	Northeast Missouri State^{†}	Wayne State Stadium; Detroit, MI	W 21–0	5,253	
October 19	at Hillsdale	Hillsdale, MI	L 3–14	3,000	
October 26	at Youngstown State	Youngstown, OH	L 7–56	4,230	
November 2	Milwaukee	Wayne State Stadium; Detroit, MI	W 22–20	2,500	
November 9	Ferris State	Wayne State Stadium; Detroit, MI	W 30–8	3,232	
November 16	Kentucky State	Wayne State Stadium; Detroit, MI	W 21–20	5,000	
^{†}Homecoming

== 1975 ==
1975 Wayne State Tartars football

GLIAC champion
- Conference: Great Lakes Intercollegiate Athletic Conference
- Record: 8–3 (3–1 GLIAC)
- Head coach: Dick Lowry (2nd season)
- Defensive coordinator: Dick Tressel (2nd season)
- Captains: Tom Hurley; Ed Skowneski
- Home stadium: Wayne State Stadium

1975 Great Lakes Intercollegiate Athletic Conference football standings
	Conf.					Overall
Team	W		L		T	W		L		T
Wayne State (MI) $	3	–	1	–	0	8	–	3	–	0
No. 15 Grand Valley State	3	–	1	–	1	7	–	2	–	1
Northwood	3	–	1	–	1	5	–	4	–	1
Hillsdale	3	–	2	–	0	7	–	4	–	0
Saginaw Valley State	1	–	3	–	0	3	–	7	–	0
Ferris State	0	–	5	–	0	0	–	10	–	0
$ – Conference champion; Rankings from NAIA Division II poll

The 1975 Wayne State Tartars football team represented Wayne State University as a member of the Great Lakes Intercollegiate Athletic Conference (GLIAC) during the 1975 NCAA Division II football season. In their second year under head coach Dick Lowry, the Tartars compiled an 8–3 record (3–1 against GLIAC opponents), won the GLIAC championship, and outscored opponents by a total of 255 to 148.

=== Schedule ===
Date	Opponent	Site	Result	Attendance	Source
September 6	Grand Valley State	Wayne State Stadium; Detroit, MI	W 15–6	4,375	
September 13	Howard*	Wayne State Stadium; Detroit, MI	L 6–7	2,000–3,369	
September 20	at Saint Joseph's (IN)*	Rennselaer, IN	W 42–13	1,009	
September 27	at Ashland*	Ashland, OH	L 21–26	4,750	
October 4	Valparaiso*^{†}	Wayne State Stadium; Detroit, MI	W 35–14	4,896	
October 11	at Northeast Missouri State*	Kirksville, MO	W 41–7	8,500	
October 18	Hillsdale	Wayne State Stadium; Detroit, MI	L 7–10	1,515	
October 25	Butler*	Wayne State Stadium; Detroit, MI	W 21–17	2,581	
November 1	at Northwood	Midland, MI	W 17–13	1,000	
November 8	at Ferris State	Big Rapids, MI	W 26–14	3,500	
November 15	Evansville*	Wayne State Stadium; Detroit, MI	W 24–21	3,162	
*Non-conference game; ^{†}Homecoming

== 1976 ==
1976 Wayne State Tartars football
- Conference: Great Lakes Intercollegiate Athletic Conference
- Record: 8–2 (3–2 GLIAC)
- Head coach: Dick Lowry (3rd season)
- Defensive coordinator: Dick Tressel (3rd season)
- Captains: Keith Anleitner; Mike Stankovich
- Home stadium: Wayne State Stadium

1976 Great Lakes Intercollegiate Athletic Conference football standings
	Conf.					Overall
Team	W		L		T	W		L		T
No. 15 Northwood $	4	–	1	–	0	5	–	2	–	1
No. 7 Grand Valley State	3	–	2	–	0	8	–	2	–	0
Wayne State (MI)	3	–	2	–	0	6	–	2	–	0
Ferris State	3	–	2	–	0	5	–	5	–	0
Hillsdale	2	–	3	–	0	5	–	5	–	0
Saginaw Valley State	0	–	5	–	0	3	–	7	–	0
$ – Conference champion; Rankings from NAIA Division II poll

The 1976 Wayne State Tartars football team represented Wayne State University as a member of the Great Lakes Intercollegiate Athletic Conference (GLIAC) during the 1976 NCAA Division II football season. In their third year under head coach Dick Lowry, the Tartars compiled an 8–2 record (3–2 against GLIAC opponents), finished in a tie for second place in the conference, and outscored opponents by a total of 254 to 136.

=== Schedule ===
Date	Opponent	Site	Result	Attendance	Source
September 10	at Howard*	RFK Stadium; Washington, DC	W 31–14	6,000–6,300	
September 18	Northwood	Tartar Field; Detroit, MI	W 29–0	3,692	
September 25	at Valparaiso*	Brown Field; Valparaiso, IN	W 16–9	2,000–3,500	
October 2	Ferris State^{†}	Detroit, MI	L 12–20	4,200	
October 9	at Hillsdale	Hillsdale, MI	W 41–20	4,200–4,500	
October 16	at Evansville*	Evansville, IN	W 35–28	3,500–4,000	
October 23	at Saginaw Valley State	University Center, MI	W 31–14	2,100	
October 30	Youngstown State*	Matthaei Field; Detroit, MI	W 28–0	3,232	
November 6	at Grand Valley State	Allendale, MI	L 0–3	1,900	
November 13	Ashland*	Wayne Stadium; Detroit, MI	W 31–28	2,550	
*Non-conference game; ^{†}Homecoming

== 1977 ==
1977 Wayne State Tartars football
- Conference: Great Lakes Intercollegiate Athletic Conference
- Record: 7–4 (3–2 GLIAC)
- Head coach: Dick Lowry (4th season)
- Defensive coordinator: Dick Tressel (4th season)
- Captains: Pat Carmody; Randy Epley
- Home stadium: Wayne State Stadium

1977 Great Lakes Intercollegiate Athletic Conference football standings
	Conf.					Overall
Team	W		L		T	W		L		T
No. 18 Grand Valley State $	4	–	1	–	0	7	–	3	–	0
Wayne State (MI)	3	–	2	–	0	7	–	4	–	0
Hillsdale	2	–	3	–	0	6	–	4	–	0
Northwood	2	–	3	–	0	5	–	4	–	0
Saginaw Valley State	2	–	3	–	0	6	–	5	–	0
Ferris State	2	–	3	–	0	3	–	7	–	0
$ – Conference champion; Rankings from NAIA Division II poll

The 1977 Wayne State Tartars football team represented Wayne State University as a member of the Great Lakes Intercollegiate Athletic Conference (GLIAC) during the 1977 NCAA Division II football season. In their fourth year under head coach Dick Lowry, the Tartars compiled a 7–4 record (3–2 against GLIAC opponents), finished in second place in the GLIAC, and outscored opponents by a total of 237 to 110.

=== Schedule ===
Date	Opponent	Site	Result	Attendance	Source
September 3	Akron*	Wayne State Stadium; Detroit, MI	L 14–24	5,129	
September 10	Wisconsin–Stevens Point*	Wayne State Stadium; Detroit, MI	W 28–21	1,520	
September 17	at Northwood	Midland, MI	W 13–0	3,800	
September 24	Valparaiso*	Wayne State Stadium; Detroit, MI	W 16–0	1,850	
October 1	at Ferris State	Big Rapids, MI	W 35–0	2,800	
October 8	Hillsdale	Wayne State Stadium; Detroit, MI	L 6–7	2,800	
October 15	at Evansville*	Evansville, IN	W 50–0	3,000	
October 22	at Eastern Illinois*	O'Brien Stadium; Charleston, IL	W 24–14	7,500	
October 29	at Youngstown State*	Rayen Stadium; Youngstown, OH	L 10–31	2,000	
November 5	Saginaw Valley	Wayne State Stadium; Detroit, MI	W 38–7	2,600	
November 12	Grand Valley	Wayne State Stadium; Detroit, MI	L 3–6	3,748	
*Non-conference game

== 1978 ==
1978 Wayne State Tartars football
- Conference: Great Lakes Intercollegiate Athletic Conference
- Record: 5–4 (4–1 GLIAC)
- Head coach: Dick Lowry (5th season)
- Home stadium: Wayne State Stadium

1978 Great Lakes Intercollegiate Athletic Conference football standings
	Conf.					Overall
Team	W		L		T	W		L		T
No. 4 Grand Valley State $^	5	–	0	–	0	9	–	3	–	0
Wayne State (MI)	4	–	1	–	0	5	–	4	–	0
Northwood	2	–	3	–	0	5	–	4	–	0
Saginaw Valley State	1	–	3	–	1	4	–	5	–	1
Ferris State	1	–	3	–	1	3	–	5	–	2
Hillsdale	1	–	4	–	0	5	–	6	–	0
$ – Conference champion; ^ – NAIA Division I playoff participant; Rankings from NAIA Division I poll

The 1978 Wayne State Tartars football team represented Wayne State University as a member of the Great Lakes Intercollegiate Athletic Conference (GLIAC) during the 1978 NCAA Division II football season. In their fifth year under head coach Dick Lowry, the Tartars compiled a 5–4 record (4–1 against GLIAC opponents), finished in second place in the GLIAC, and were outscored by a total of 172 to 152.

=== Schedule ===
Date	Opponent	Site	Result	Attendance	Source
September 9	at Saginaw Valley State	Wickes Stadium; University Center, MI	W 14–10		
September 16	Youngstown State*	Detroit, MI	L 10–21		
September 23	at Akron*	Rubber Bowl; Akron, OH	L 0–28	34,529	
September 30	Ferris State	Detroit, MI	W 25–18		
October 7	at Hillsdale	Hillsdale, MI	W 21–16		
October 14	Evansville*	Detroit, MI	W 34–7		
October 28	No. 8 Eastern Illinois*	Detroit, MI	L 14–34	1,800	
November 4	at Northwood	Midland, MI	W 24–14		
November 11	at Grand Valley State	Lakers Stadium; Allendale, MI	L 10–24	2,382	
*Non-conference game; Rankings from Associated Press Poll released prior to the game

== 1979 ==
1979 Wayne State Tartars football
- Conference: Great Lakes Intercollegiate Athletic Conference
- Record: 3–5–1 (3–1–1 GLIAC)
- Head coach: Dick Lowry (6th season)
- Home stadium: Wayne State Stadium

1979 Great Lakes Intercollegiate Athletic Conference football standings
	Conf.					Overall
Team	W		L		T	W		L		T
No. 8 Saginaw Valley State $^	4	–	0	–	1	8	–	2	–	1
Wayne State (MI)	3	–	1	–	1	3	–	5	–	1
Ferris State	3	–	2	–	0	5	–	4	–	1
Grand Valley State	2	–	3	–	0	4	–	5	–	0
Northwood	1	–	4	–	0	5	–	4	–	0
Hillsdale	1	–	4	–	0	3	–	8	–	0
$ – Conference champion; ^ – NAIA Division I playoff participant; Rankings from NAIA Division I poll

The 1979 Wayne State Tartars football team represented Wayne State University as a member of the Great Lakes Intercollegiate Athletic Conference (GLIAC) during the 1979 NCAA Division II football season. In their sixth and final year under head coach Dick Lowry, the Tartars compiled a 3–5–1 record (3–1–1 against GLIAC opponents), finished in second place in the GLIAC, and were outscored by a total of 171 to 130.

Two weeks after the season ended, Lowry was hired as the head football coach at Hillsdale College. He compiled a 38-21-1 record in six years at Wayne State.

=== Schedule ===
Date	Opponent	Site	Result	Attendance	Source
September 8	New Hampshire*	Wayne State Stadium; Detroit, MI	L 14–24		
September 15	at Eastern Illinois*	O'Brien Stadium; Charleston, IL	L 21–58	7,500	
September 22	at Northern Michigan*	Marquette, MI	L 29–31		
October 6	Grand Valley State	Wayne State Stadium; Detroit, MI	W 17–14	3,000	
October 13	at Towson*	Towson, MD	L 0–7		
October 20	Ferris State	Wayne State Stadium; Detroit, MI	W 10–6		
October 27	Northwood	Wayne State Stadium; Detroit, MI	W 16–6		
November 3	at Hillsdale	Hillsdale, MI	L 16–18		
November 10	at Saginaw Valley State	Wickes Stadium; University Center, MI	T 7–7		
*Non-conference game
