= Dave Hoover (American football) =

American football player and coach

Biographical details
- Born: July 13, 1942; Des Moines, Iowa, U.S.
- Died: September 13, 2013 (aged 71); Olathe, Kansas, U.S.

Playing career
- 1961–1963: Iowa State

Coaching career (HC unless noted)
- ?–1971: Wayne State (MI) (assistant)
- 1972–1973: Wayne State (MI)
- 1974–1978: Emporia State

Head coaching record
- Overall: 16–50–1

David F. Hoover (July 13, 1942 – September 13, 2013) was an American former football player and coach. He served as the head football coach at Wayne State University in Detroit, Michigan from 1972 to 1973 and at Emporia State University in Emporia, Kansas from 1974 until 1978, compiling a career record of 16–50–1. His record at Emporia State was 9–40. Hoover played college football at Iowa State University from 1961 to 1963. He was born in Des Moines, Iowa, and died at Mission Trail Middle School in Olathe, Kansas.

== Head coaching record ==
Year	Team	Overall	Conference	Standing	Bowl/playoffs
Wayne State Tartars (NCAA College Division / Division II independent) (1972–1973)
1972	Wayne State	2–5–1			
1973	Wayne State	5–5			
Wayne State:		7–10–1			
Emporia State Hornets (Great Plains Athletic Conference) (1974–1975)
1974	Emporia State	2–7	1–4	T–4th	
1975	Emporia State	1–9	0–5	6th	
Emporia State Hornets (Central States Intercollegiate Conference) (1976–1978)
1976	Emporia State	0–10	0–6	7th	
1977	Emporia State	3–7	2–5	T–5th	
1978	Emporia State	3–7	2–5	T–6th	
Emporia State:		9–40	5–25		
Total:		16–50–1			
