= 1971 Florida A&M Rattlers football team =

American college football season

1971 Florida A&M Rattlers football

Orange Blossom Classic, W 9–27 vs. Kentucky State
- Conference: Southern Intercollegiate Athletic Conference
- Division I
- Record: 6–5 (3–1 SIAC)
- Head coach: Clarence Montgomery (1st season)
- Home stadium: Bragg Memorial Stadium

The 1971 Florida A&M Rattlers football team represented Florida A&M University as a member of Division I of the Southern Intercollegiate Athletic Conference (SIAC) during the 1971 NCAA College Division football season. Led by first-year head coach Clarence Montgomery, the Rattlers finished the season overall record of 6–5 and a mark of 3–1 in conference play.

== Schedule ==
Date	Opponent	Site	Result	Attendance	Source
September 25	at North Carolina A&T*	World War Memorial Stadium; Greensboro, NC	W 9–6	12,424–15,720	
October 2	South Carolina State*	Bragg Memorial Stadium; Tallahassee, FL	W 28–7	11,986–14,500	
October 9	at Alabama A&M	Milton Frank Stadium; Huntsville, AL	L 13–14	7,363	
October 16	Morris Brown	Bragg Memorial Stadium; Tallahassee, FL	W 45–30	15,386	
October 23	at No. 9 Tennessee State*	Dudley Field; Nashville, TN	L 8–50	32,000–34,976	
October 30	at Tuskegee	Cramton Bowl; Montgomery, AL	W 24–17	14,625	
November 6	vs. Santa Clara*	Oakland–Alameda County Coliseum; Oakland, CA (Bay Area College Classic)	L 16–29	18,450–18,560	
November 13	Southern*	Bragg Memorial Stadium; Tallahassee, FL	L 9–13	11,700–11,903	
November 20	Bethune–Cookman	Bragg Memorial Stadium; Tallahassee, FL (Florida Classic)	W 33–20	11,550–13,477	
November 27	at Tampa*	Tampa Stadium; Tampa, Fl	L 14–56	37,112	
December 11	vs. Kentucky State*	Miami Orange Bowl; Miami, FL (Orange Blossom Classic)	W 27–9	26,161	
*Non-conference game; Rankings from AP Poll released prior to the game; Source:
