= Samford Bulldogs football, 1970–1973 =

American college football seasons

The Samford Bulldogs football program, 1970–1973 represented Samford University during the 1970s in college football. During this time, the Bulldogs were led by head coach Wayne Grubb and had an overall record of 22–14–2 during this period. During this decade, the Bulldogs competed as an independent and played their home games at Seibert Stadium on-campus in Homewood, Alabama.

After they finished with a 5–5 record in 1970, Grubb led the Bulldogs to a 9–1 season with a victory in the Amos Alonzo Stagg Bowl in 1971. However, their victory in the Stagg Bowl was later vacated after it was discovered they played the game with ineligible players, which made their 1971 record 8–1. Samford finsied this era with records of 5–3–2 in 1972 and 4–5 in 1973.

In February 1974, the chairman of the university Board of Trustees Ben R. Brown announced Samford was formally discontinuing their football program. At the time of the announcement, both financial losses and dwindling fan support were cited as the primary reasons for the elimination of the program. In 1984 Samford reestablished their football program.

== 1970 ==
1970 Samford Bulldogs football
- Conference: Independent
- Record: 5–5
- Head coach: Wayne Grubb (2nd season)
- Home stadium: Seibert Stadium

1970 NCAA College Division independents football records
	Conf.			Overall
Team	W	L	T	W		L		T
No. 4 Tampa		–		10	–	1	–	0
No. 5 Tennessee State		–		10	–	0	–	0
No. 11 Delaware		–		9	–	2	–	0
Hawaii		–		9	–	2	–	0
Northern Michigan		–		8	–	2	–	0
No. 19 Eastern Michigan		–		7	–	2	–	1
Mankato State		–		7	–	2	–	1
Akron		–		7	–	3	–	0
Central Michigan		–		7	–	3	–	0
Temple		–		7	–	3	–	0
Drake		–		7	–	4	–	0
Wayne State (MI)		–		6	–	2	–	0
Arkansas AM&N		–		6	–	3	–	0
Southern Illinois		–		6	–	3	–	0
St. Norbert		–		6	–	3	–	0
Nevada		–		6	–	3	–	1
Portland State		–		6	–	4	–	0
UNLV		–		6	–	4	–	0
Boston University		–		5	–	4	–	0
Cortland		–		5	–	4	–	0
Indiana (PA)		–		5	–	4	–	0
Santa Clara		–		5	–	4	–	1
Lafayette		–		6	–	5	–	0
Colorado College		–		4	–	4	–	0
Drexel		–		4	–	4	–	0
Hofstra		–		5	–	5	–	0
Indiana State		–		5	–	5	–	0
Samford		–		5	–	5	–	0
Wabash		–		3	–	3	–	2
Saint Mary's		–		3	–	4	–	0
Ashland		–		4	–	6	–	0
Bucknell		–		4	–	6	–	0
Lehigh		–		4	–	6	–	0
Rose Poly		–		3	–	5	–	1
Northeastern		–		3	–	5	–	0
Indiana Central		–		3	–	6	–	0
Lake Forest		–		3	–	6	–	0
Kentucky State		–		3	–	6	–	0
Chicago		–		2	–	5	–	0
Chattanooga		–		3	–	8	–	0
Parsons		–		2	–	7	–	0
Eastern Illinois		–		2	–	8	–	0
Milwaukee		–		1	–	9	–	0
Rankings from AP small college poll

The 1970 Samford Bulldogs football team was an American football team that represented Samford University as an independent during the 1970 NCAA College Division football season. In their second year under head coach Wayne Grubb, the team compiled a 5–5 record. Samford played their home games on campus at Seibert Stadium in Homewood, Alabama.

Schedule

Date	Opponent	Site	Result	Attendance	Source
September 12	at Pensacola Navy	Kane Field; Pensacola, FL	W 17–14	7,006	
September 19	Jacksonville State	Seibert Stadium; Homewood, AL (rivalry)	L 9–34	6,000	
October 3	Delta State	Seibert Stadium; Homewood, AL	W 26–0	5,500	
October 10	vs. Livingston	Ray Stadium; Meridian, MS	L 21–37		
October 17	Gardner–Webb	Seibert Stadium; Homewood, AL	W 56–28		
October 24	Mississippi College^{†}	Seibert Stadium; Homewood, AL	W 21–13	3,100	
October 31	at Florence State	Braly Municipal Stadium; Florence, AL	L 10–24	7,500	
November 7	at Appalachian State	Conrad Stadium; Boone, NC	W 42–35	4,500	
November 14	at Newberry	Setzler Field; Newberry, SC	L 21–35	2,500	
November 21	at Carson–Newman	Burke–Tarr Stadium; Jefferson City, TN	L 12–21		
^{†}Homecoming

== 1971 ==
1971 Samford Bulldogs football

Amos Alonzo Stagg Bowl, V 20–10 vs. Ohio Wesleyan
- Conference: Independent
- Record: 8–1
- Head coach: Wayne Grubb (3rd season)
- Home stadium: Seibert Stadium

1971 NCAA College Division independents football records
	Conf.			Overall
Team	W	L	T	W		L		T
No. 1 Delaware		–		10	–	1	–	0
No. 5 Tennessee State		–		9	–	1	–	0
No. 2 McNeese State		–		9	–	1	–	1
Samford		–		8	–	1	–	0
Colorado College		–		7	–	1	–	0
No. 8 Akron		–		8	–	2	–	0
No. 3 Eastern Michigan		–		7	–	1	–	2
Arkansas AM&N		–		7	–	2	–	0
Indiana (PA)		–		7	–	2	–	0
Kentucky State		–		8	–	3	–	0
Appalachian State		–		7	–	3	–	1
Northern Michigan		–		7	–	3	–	0
Hawaii		–		7	–	4	–	0
Ashland		–		6	–	4	–	0
Santa Clara		–		6	–	4	–	0
Southern Illinois		–		6	–	4	–	0
Tampa		–		6	–	5	–	0
UNLV		–		5	–	4	–	1
Bucknell		–		5	–	5	–	0
Central Michigan		–		5	–	5	–	0
Milwaukee		–		5	–	5	–	0
Nevada		–		5	–	5	–	0
St. Norbert		–		5	–	5	–	0
Wayne State (MI)		–		4	–	4	–	0
Hofstra		–		5	–	6	–	0
Cortland		–		4	–	5	–	0
Northeastern		–		4	–	5	–	0
Portland State		–		4	–	5	–	0
Ball State		–		4	–	5	–	1
Chicago		–		3	–	4	–	0
Northeast Louisiana		–		4	–	6	–	1
Eastern Illinois		–		4	–	6	–	0
Indiana State		–		4	–	6	–	0
Saint Mary's		–		3	–	5	–	0
Rose-Hulman		–		3	–	6	–	0
Boston University		–		3	–	7	–	0
Drexel		–		2	–	6	–	0
Chattanooga		–		2	–	9	–	0
Rankings from AP small college poll

The 1971 Samford Bulldogs football team was an American football team that represented Samford University as an independent during the 1971 NCAA College Division football season. In their third year under head coach Wayne Grubb, the team compiled a 8–1 record. Samford played their home games on campus at Seibert Stadium in Homewood, Alabama.

In April 1972, the NCAA determined three ineligible players competed for Samford in the Amos Alonzo Stagg Bowl. As part of their punishment for this infraction, their Stagg Bowl victory was officially vacated.

Schedule

Date	Opponent	Site	Result	Attendance	Source
September 18	Carson–Newman	Seibert Stadium; Homewood, AL	W 7–0	4,000	
October 2	vs. Florence State	Russellville Stadium; Russellville, AL	W 17–10	8,000	
October 9	Livingston	Seibert Stadium; Homewood, AL	L 3–28	5,500	
October 16	at Gardner–Webb	Ernest W. Spangler Stadium; Boiling Springs, NC	W 9–7	4,500	
October 23	at Jacksonville State	Paul Snow Stadium; Jacksonville, AL (rivalry)	W 31–21	6,200	
October 30	Millsaps^{†}	Seibert Stadium; Homewood, AL	W 33–0	3,500	
November 6	at Mississippi College	Robinson Field; Clinton, MS	W 41–0		
November 13	Newberry	Seibert Stadium; Homewood, AL	W 21–0	2,500	
November 20	at Delta State	Delta Field; Cleveland, MS	W 30–24	3,000	
November 25	vs. Ohio Wesleyan	Phenix Municipal Stadium; Phenix City, AL (Stagg Bowl)	W 20–10 (vacated)	1,200	
^{†}Homecoming

== 1972 ==
1972 Samford Bulldogs football
- Conference: Independent
- Record: 5–3–2
- Head coach: Wayne Grubb (4th season)
- Home stadium: Seibert Stadium

1972 NCAA College Division independents football records
	Conf.			Overall
Team	W	L	T	W		L		T
No. 4 Ashland		–		11	–	0	–	0
Bridgeport		–		11	–	0	–	0
No. 1 Delaware		–		10	–	0	–	0
No. 5 Tennessee State		–		11	–	1	–	0
Colorado College		–		8	–	1	–	0
Tampa		–		10	–	2	–	0
Trinity (TX)		–		8	–	2	–	0
Western Carolina		–		7	–	2	–	1
Hawaii		–		8	–	3	–	0
Indiana State		–		7	–	3	–	0
Northeastern		–		6	–	2	–	0
Bucknell		–		6	–	3	–	0
Cortland		–		6	–	3	–	0
San Diego		–		6	–	3	–	1
Arkansas–Pine Bluff		–		4	–	2	–	1
Eastern Michigan		–		6	–	4	–	0
Milwaukee		–		6	–	4	–	0
Samford		–		5	–	3	–	2
Ball State		–		5	–	4	–	1
Lake Forest		–		4	–	3	–	1
Nevada		–		6	–	5	–	0
Central Michigan		–		5	–	5	–	1
Rose-Hulman		–		5	–	5	–	0
Santa Clara		–		4	–	4	–	1
Akron		–		3	–	4	–	2
St. Norbert		–		4	–	5	–	0
Saint Mary's		–		3	–	4	–	0
Kentucky State		–		4	–	6	–	0
Drexel		–		3	–	6	–	0
Northeast Louisiana		–		3	–	7	–	0
Portland State		–		3	–	8	–	0
Wayne State (MI)		–		2	–	5	–	1
Boston University		–		2	–	8	–	0
Northern Michigan		–		2	–	8	–	0
Saint Peter's		–		2	–	8	–	0
Chattanooga		–		2	–	9	–	0
Southern Illinois		–		1	–	8	–	1
Eastern Illinois		–		1	–	9	–	0
Madison		–		0	–	4	–	1
UNLV		–		1	–	10	–	0
Rankings from AP small college poll

The 1972 Samford Bulldogs football team was an American football team that represented Samford University as an independent during the 1972 NCAA College Division football season. In their fourth year under head coach Wayne Grubb, the team compiled a 5–3–2 record. Samford played their home games on campus at Seibert Stadium in Homewood, Alabama.

Schedule

Date	Opponent	Site	Result	Attendance	Source
September 9	at Carson–Newman	Burke–Tarr Stadium; Jefferson City, TN	L 19–27	7,500	
September 16	at Florence State	Braly Municipal Stadium; Florence, AL	W 24–10	6,000	
September 23	Gardner–Webb	Seibert Stadium; Homewood, AL	W 21–7	2,100	
September 30	Arkansas–Monticello	Seibert Stadium; Homewood, AL	W 35–21	4,500	
October 7	Wofford^{†}	Seibert Stadium; Homewood, AL	W 30–14	5,000	
October 14	at Henderson State	Haygood Stadium; Arkadelphia, AR	W 27–21	3,500	
October 21	at Livingston	Tiger Stadium; Livingston, AL	L 0–10	5,500	
November 4	vs. Jacksonville State	Memorial Stadium; Anniston, AL (rivalry)	L 6–27	5,000	
November 11	at Newberry	Setzler Field; Newberry, SC	T 7–7	3,500	
November 18	Mississippi College	Seibert Stadium; Homewood, AL	T 13–13	1,000	
^{†}Homecoming

== 1973 ==
1973 Samford Bulldogs football
- Conference: Independent
- Record: 4–5
- Head coach: Wayne Grubb (5th season)
- Home stadium: Seibert Stadium

1973 NCAA Division II independents football records
	Conf.			Overall
Team	W	L	T	W		L		T
No. 1 Tennessee State		–		10	–	0	–	0
No. 9 Hawaii		–		9	–	2	–	0
Nebraska–Omaha		–		7	–	2	–	1
Trinity (TX)		–		8	–	3	–	0
UNLV		–		8	–	3	–	0
No. 13 Delaware ^		–		8	–	4	–	0
Western Carolina		–		6	–	3	–	1
Central Michigan		–		7	–	4	–	0
Nevada		–		7	–	4	–	0
Western Illinois		–		7	–	4	–	0
Milwaukee		–		6	–	4	–	1
Eastern Michigan		–		6	–	4	–	0
American International		–		5	–	4	–	0
Akron		–		6	–	5	–	0
Central State (OH)		–		6	–	5	–	0
Ball State		–		5	–	5	–	1
Wayne State (MI)		–		5	–	5	–	0
Drexel		–		4	–	4	–	0
Bucknell		–		3	–	4	–	2
Northeast Louisiana		–		3	–	5	–	2
Santa Clara		–		4	–	6	–	0
Youngstown State		–		4	–	6	–	0
Arkansas–Pine Bluff		–		3	–	5	–	1
Chattanooga		–		4	–	7	–	0
Indiana State		–		4	–	7	–	0
Northeastern		–		3	–	6	–	0
Kentucky State		–		3	–	8	–	0
Northern Michigan		–		2	–	7	–	1
Eastern Illinois		–		2	–	9	–	0
Portland State		–		1	–	10	–	0
^ – NCAA Division II playoff participant; Rankings from AP small college poll

The 1973 Samford Bulldogs football team was an American football team that represented Samford University as an independent during the 1973 NCAA Division II football season. In their fifth year under head coach Wayne Grubb, the team compiled a 4–5 record. Samford played their home games on campus at Seibert Stadium in Homewood, Alabama.

Schedule

Date	Opponent	Site	Result	Attendance	Source
September 15	Elon	Seibert Stadium; Homewood, AL	L 10–33	4,000	
September 22	at Gardner–Webb	Ernest W. Spangler Stadium; Boiling Springs, NC	L 0–17	3,111	
September 29	at Arkansas–Monticello	Cotton Boll Stadium; Monticello, AR	L 17–20	3,100	
October 6	at Guilford	Armfield Athletic Center; Greensboro, NC	W 35–0	2,415	
October 13	Livingston^{†}	Seibert Stadium; Homewood, AL	L 6–8	4,501	
October 20	Harding	Seibert Stadium; Homewood, AL	W 35–22		
October 27	Newberry	Seibert Stadium; Homewood, AL	W 42–28	2,350	
November 3	at Mars Hill	Meares Stadium; Mars Hill, NC	W 45–27	2,650	
November 17	at Mississippi College	Robinson Field; Clinton, MS	L 10–12	2,381	
^{†}Homecoming
