= Whitey Wolter =

American football player (1899–1947)

Herbert Max "Whitey" Wolter
No. 75, 72
- Position: Defensive tackle

Personal information
- Born: August 22, 1899; Milwaukee, Wisconsin
- Died: August 22, 1947 (aged 48); Cedarburg, Wisconsin
- Listed height: 5 ft 10 in (1.78 m)
- Listed weight: 170 lb (77 kg)

Career information
- High school: Temple (TX) Dunbar
- College: UW–Milwaukee

Career history
- Kenosha Maroons (1924)

Herbert Max "Whitey" Wolter (August 22, 1899 - 21 August 1947) was an American football player in the National Football League for the Kenosha Maroons in 1924.

== Early life ==
Wolter was born in Milwaukee, Wisconsin, and played football at North Side High School in 1916 and 1917. He attended the Milwaukee State Teachers College where he played at the college level.

== Professional career ==
After college, Wolter played for local independent teams. In 1924, he played one season for the Kenosha Maroons as tailback.

== Personal ==
Wolter and his wife Alice had two daughters, Carla and Marjorie. Wolter died at the age of 48 in Cedarburg, Wisconsin.
