= 1971 McNeese State Cowboys football team =

American college football season

1971 McNeese State Cowboys football

Grantland Rice Bowl, L 23–26 vs. Tennessee State
- Conference: Independent
- Record: 9–1–1 ( Independent)
- Head coach: Jack Doland (2nd season)
- Home stadium: Cowboy Stadium

1971 NCAA College Division independents football records
| | Conf. | | | Overall |
| Team | W | L | T | W | | L | | T |
|---|---|---|---|---|---|---|---|---|
| No. 1 Delaware | | – | | 10 | – | 1 | – | 0 |
| No. 5 Tennessee State | | – | | 9 | – | 1 | – | 0 |
| No. 2 McNeese State | | – | | 9 | – | 1 | – | 1 |
| Samford | | – | | 8 | – | 1 | – | 0 |
| Colorado College | | – | | 7 | – | 1 | – | 0 |
| No. 8 Akron | | – | | 8 | – | 2 | – | 0 |
| No. 3 Eastern Michigan | | – | | 7 | – | 1 | – | 2 |
| Arkansas AM&N | | – | | 7 | – | 2 | – | 0 |
| Indiana (PA) | | – | | 7 | – | 2 | – | 0 |
| Kentucky State | | – | | 8 | – | 3 | – | 0 |
| Appalachian State | | – | | 7 | – | 3 | – | 1 |
| Northern Michigan | | – | | 7 | – | 3 | – | 0 |
| Hawaii | | – | | 7 | – | 4 | – | 0 |
| Ashland | | – | | 6 | – | 4 | – | 0 |
| Santa Clara | | – | | 6 | – | 4 | – | 0 |
| Southern Illinois | | – | | 6 | – | 4 | – | 0 |
| Tampa | | – | | 6 | – | 5 | – | 0 |
| UNLV | | – | | 5 | – | 4 | – | 1 |
| Bucknell | | – | | 5 | – | 5 | – | 0 |
| Central Michigan | | – | | 5 | – | 5 | – | 0 |
| Milwaukee | | – | | 5 | – | 5 | – | 0 |
| Nevada | | – | | 5 | – | 5 | – | 0 |
| St. Norbert | | – | | 5 | – | 5 | – | 0 |
| Wayne State (MI) | | – | | 4 | – | 4 | – | 0 |
| Hofstra | | – | | 5 | – | 6 | – | 0 |
| Cortland | | – | | 4 | – | 5 | – | 0 |
| Northeastern | | – | | 4 | – | 5 | – | 0 |
| Portland State | | – | | 4 | – | 5 | – | 0 |
| Ball State | | – | | 4 | – | 5 | – | 1 |
| Chicago | | – | | 3 | – | 4 | – | 0 |
| Northeast Louisiana | | – | | 4 | – | 6 | – | 1 |
| Eastern Illinois | | – | | 4 | – | 6 | – | 0 |
| Indiana State | | – | | 4 | – | 6 | – | 0 |
| Saint Mary's | | – | | 3 | – | 5 | – | 0 |
| Rose-Hulman | | – | | 3 | – | 6 | – | 0 |
| Boston University | | – | | 3 | – | 7 | – | 0 |
| Drexel | | – | | 2 | – | 6 | – | 0 |
| Chattanooga | | – | | 2 | – | 9 | – | 0 |
Rankings from AP small college poll

The 1971 McNeese State Cowboys football team was an American football team that represented McNeese State University as an independent during the 1971 NCAA College Division football season. In their second year under head coach Jack Doland, the team compiled an overall record of 9–1–1 and lost to Tennessee State in the Grantland Rice Bowl.

== Schedule ==
| Date | Opponent | Rank | Site | Result | Attendance | Source |
|---|---|---|---|---|---|---|
| September 11 | East Texas State | | Cowboy Stadium; Lake Charles, LA | W 47–3 | 12,226 | |
| September 18 | at Sam Houston State | | Pritchett Field; Huntsville, TX | W 15–13 | 7,000 | |
| September 25 | at Tennessee–Martin | | Pacer Stadium; Martin, TN | W 24–20 | 7,000 | |
| October 2 | No. 7 Louisiana Tech | | Cowboy Stadium; Lake Charles, LA | W 29–22 | 13,500 | |
| October 9 | Lamar | No. 10 | Cowboy Stadium; Lake Charles, LA (rivalry) | W 38–0 | 13,000 | |
| October 16 | at Northeast Louisiana | No. 4 | Brown Stadium; Monroe, LA | W 31–21 | 8,000 | |
| October 30 | Troy State | No. 2 | Cowboy Stadium; Lake Charles, LA | W 17–7 | 14,300 | |
| November 6 | at Northwestern State | No. 1 | Demon Stadium; Natchitoches, LA (rivalry) | T 3–3 | 7,000 | |
| November 13 | Southeastern Louisiana | No. 2 | Cowboy Stadium; Lake Charles, LA | W 31–0 | 13,000 | |
| November 19 | at Southwestern Louisiana | No. 2 | Cajun Field; Lafayette, LA (rivalry) | W 20–10 | 25,000 | |
| December 11 | vs. No. 5 Tennessee State | No. 2 | BREC Memorial Stadium; Baton Rouge, LA (Grantland Rice Bowl) | L 23–26 | 15,271 | |
Rankings from AP Poll released prior to the game
