= 1971 Eastern Michigan Hurons football team =

American college football season

1971 Eastern Michigan Hurons football

Pioneer Bowl, L 3–14 vs. Louisiana Tech
- Conference: Independent
- Record: 7–1–2
- Head coach: Dan Boisture (5th season)
- Captain: Dave Pureifory
- Home stadium: Rynearson Stadium

1971 NCAA College Division independents football records
	Conf.			Overall
Team	W	L	T	W		L		T
No. 1 Delaware		–		10	–	1	–	0
No. 5 Tennessee State		–		9	–	1	–	0
No. 2 McNeese State		–		9	–	1	–	1
Samford		–		8	–	1	–	0
Colorado College		–		7	–	1	–	0
No. 8 Akron		–		8	–	2	–	0
No. 3 Eastern Michigan		–		7	–	1	–	2
Arkansas AM&N		–		7	–	2	–	0
Indiana (PA)		–		7	–	2	–	0
Kentucky State		–		8	–	3	–	0
Appalachian State		–		7	–	3	–	1
Northern Michigan		–		7	–	3	–	0
Hawaii		–		7	–	4	–	0
Illinois College		–		5	–	3	–	0
Ashland		–		6	–	4	–	0
Santa Clara		–		6	–	4	–	0
Southern Illinois		–		6	–	4	–	0
Tampa		–		6	–	5	–	0
UNLV		–		5	–	4	–	1
Bucknell		–		5	–	5	–	0
Central Michigan		–		5	–	5	–	0
Milwaukee		–		5	–	5	–	0
Nevada		–		5	–	5	–	0
St. Norbert		–		5	–	5	–	0
Wayne State (MI)		–		4	–	4	–	0
Hofstra		–		5	–	6	–	0
Cortland		–		4	–	5	–	0
Northeastern		–		4	–	5	–	0
Portland State		–		4	–	5	–	0
Ball State		–		4	–	5	–	1
Chicago		–		3	–	4	–	0
Northeast Louisiana		–		4	–	6	–	1
Eastern Illinois		–		4	–	6	–	0
Indiana State		–		4	–	6	–	0
Saint Mary's		–		3	–	5	–	0
Rose-Hulman		–		3	–	6	–	0
Boston University		–		3	–	7	–	0
Drexel		–		2	–	6	–	0
Chattanooga		–		2	–	9	–	0
Rankings from AP small college poll

The 1971 Eastern Michigan Hurons football team represented Eastern Michigan University as an independent during the 1971 NCAA College Division football season. In their fifth season under head coach Dan Boisture, the Hurons compiled a 7–1–2 record and outscored their opponents, 228 to 85. Dave Pureifory was the team captain. The Hurons were undefeated in the regular season, were ranked No. 3 in the NCAA College Division, allowed only one touchdown in the last five games, and advanced to the College Division quarterfinals. In the first bowl game in the program's 79-year existence, the Hurons lost to Louisiana Tech in the inaugural Pioneer Bowl in Wichita Falls, Texas, by a score of 14 to 3. Houston Booth was the team's starting quarterback.

== Schedule ==
Date	Opponent	Rank	Site	Result	Attendance	Source
September 11	Wisconsin–Oshkosh		Rynearson Stadium; Ypsilanti, MI	W 50–0		
September 18	Quantico Marines		Rynearson Stadium; Ypsilanti, MI	W 28–20		
October 2	at Idaho State	No. 8	ASISU Minidome; Pocatello, ID	W 23–22	10,000	
October 9	No. 5 Western Kentucky	No. 6	Rynearson Stadium; Ypsilanti, MI	W 17–14	12,200	
October 16	Eastern Kentucky^{†}	No. 2	Rynearson Stadium; Ypsilanti, MI	T 0–0		
October 23	at Milwaukee	No. 3	Milwaukee County Stadium; Milwaukee, WI	W 31–0	2,500	
October 30	Northern Michigan	No. 4	Rynearson Stadium; Ypsilanti, MI	W 31–3		
November 6	at Northeast Louisiana	No. 2	Brown Stadium; Monroe, LA	T 10–10		
November 13	South Dakota State	No. 3	Rynearson Stadium; Ypsilanti, MI	W 35–2		
December 11	vs. No. 4 Louisiana Tech	No. 3	Memorial Stadium; Wichita Falls, TX (Pioneer Bowl)	L 3–14	8,156	
^{†}Homecoming; Rankings from AP Poll released prior to the game

== After the season ==
The following Hurons were selected in the 1972 NFL draft after the season.

Round	Pick	Player	Position	NFL club
6	142	Dave Pureifory	Linebacker	Green Bay Packers
7	170	Will Foster	Linebacker	Philadelphia Eagles
8	196	Larry Ratcliff	Running back	Philadelphia Eagles
13	325	Sam Elmore	Defensive back	New England Patriots
