= 1971 Tennessee State Tigers football team =

American college football season

1971 Tennessee State Tigers football

Black college football national champion

Grantland Rice Bowl, W 26–23 vs. McNeese State
- Conference: Independent
- Record: 9–1
- Head coach: John Merritt (9th season)
- Home stadium: Hale Stadium; Dudley Field

1971 NCAA College Division independents football records
	Conf.			Overall
Team	W	L	T	W		L		T
No. 1 Delaware		–		10	–	1	–	0
No. 5 Tennessee State		–		9	–	1	–	0
No. 2 McNeese State		–		9	–	1	–	1
Samford		–		8	–	1	–	0
Colorado College		–		7	–	1	–	0
No. 8 Akron		–		8	–	2	–	0
No. 3 Eastern Michigan		–		7	–	1	–	2
Arkansas AM&N		–		7	–	2	–	0
Indiana (PA)		–		7	–	2	–	0
Kentucky State		–		8	–	3	–	0
Appalachian State		–		7	–	3	–	1
Northern Michigan		–		7	–	3	–	0
Hawaii		–		7	–	4	–	0
Ashland		–		6	–	4	–	0
Santa Clara		–		6	–	4	–	0
Southern Illinois		–		6	–	4	–	0
Tampa		–		6	–	5	–	0
UNLV		–		5	–	4	–	1
Bucknell		–		5	–	5	–	0
Central Michigan		–		5	–	5	–	0
Milwaukee		–		5	–	5	–	0
Nevada		–		5	–	5	–	0
St. Norbert		–		5	–	5	–	0
Wayne State (MI)		–		4	–	4	–	0
Hofstra		–		5	–	6	–	0
Cortland		–		4	–	5	–	0
Northeastern		–		4	–	5	–	0
Portland State		–		4	–	5	–	0
Ball State		–		4	–	5	–	1
Chicago		–		3	–	4	–	0
Northeast Louisiana		–		4	–	6	–	1
Eastern Illinois		–		4	–	6	–	0
Indiana State		–		4	–	6	–	0
Saint Mary's		–		3	–	5	–	0
Rose-Hulman		–		3	–	6	–	0
Boston University		–		3	–	7	–	0
Drexel		–		2	–	6	–	0
Chattanooga		–		2	–	9	–	0
Rankings from AP small college poll

The 1971 Tennessee State Tigers football team represented Tennessee State University as an independent during the 1971 NCAA College Division football season. In their ninth season under head coach John Merritt, the Tigers compiled a 9–1 record, defeated McNeese State in the Grantland Rice Bowl, and outscored all opponents by a total of 403 to 151. The team was also recognized as the 1971 black college national champion and was ranked No. 5 in the final small college rankings issued by the Associated Press and No. 14 in the final poll issued by the United Press International.

== Schedule ==
Date	Opponent	Rank	Site	Result	Attendance	Source
September 25	vs. Alcorn A&M		Memphis Memorial Stadium; Memphis, TN	W 18–7	17,006	
October 2	at Texas Southern	No. 10	Rice Stadium; Houston, TX	L 23–28	20,000	
October 9	No. 3 Grambling		Hale Stadium; Nashville, TN	W 41–35	18,000–25,000	
October 16	vs. Prairie View	No. 9	Cotton Bowl; Dallas, TX	W 42–20	15,000	
October 23	Florida A&M	No. 9	Dudley Field; Nashville, TN	W 50–8	32,000	
October 30	at Southern	No. 7	University Stadium; Baton Rouge, LA	W 27–16	19,451	
November 6	at Morris Brown	No. 7	Herndon Stadium; Atlanta, GA	W 61–7	15,000	
November 13	Wisconsin–Superior	No. 6	Hale Stadium; Nashville, TN	W 54–7	9,000	
November 20	Central State (OH)	No. 4	Hale Stadium; Nashville, TN	W 61–0	8,000	
December 11	vs. No. 2 McNeese State	No. 5	BREC Memorial Stadium; Baton Rouge, LA (Grantland Rice Bowl)	W 26–23	15,271	
Rankings from AP Poll released prior to the game
