= 1971 small college football rankings =

- Selectors: AP, UPI
- No. 1: Delaware
- Small college football rankings (AP, UPI)
- «1970 1972»

The 1971 small college football rankings are rankings of college football teams representing smaller college and university teams during the 1971 college football season, including the 1971 NCAA College Division football season and the 1971 NAIA football season. Separate rankings were published by the Associated Press (AP) and the United Press International (UPI). The AP rankings were selected by a board of sports writers, and the UPI rankings were selected by a board of small-college coaches.

The 1971 Delaware Fightin' Blue Hens football team (10–1), led by head coach Tubby Raymond, was rated No. 1 by both the AP and UPI. McNeese State (9–1–1) and Eastern Michigan (7–1–2) were ranked No. 2 and No. 3, respectively, by both the AP and the UPI.

== Legend ==
	Increase in ranking
	Decrease in ranking
	Not ranked previous week
(#–#)	Win–loss record
(Italics)	Number of first place votes
т	Tied with team above or below also with this symbol

== AP poll ==
	Week 1 Sept 22	Week 2 Sept 29	Week 3 Oct 6	Week 4 Oct 13	Week 5 Oct 20	Week 6 Oct 27	Week 7 Nov 3	Week 8 Nov 10	Week 9 Nov 17	Week 10 Nov 24	
1.	North Dakota State (2–0) (8)	Arkansas State (2–0) (8)	North Dakota State (4–0) (6)	North Dakota State (5–0)	Delaware (5–0)	Delaware (6–0) (10)	McNeese State (7–0) (1)	Delaware (7–1)	Delaware (8–1) (12)	Delaware (9–1) (9)	1.
2.	Arkansas State (1–0) (5)	North Dakota State (3–0) (5)	Arkansas State (2–0) (7)	Eastern Michigan (4–0)	McNeese State (6–0)	McNeese State (6–0) (3)	Eastern Michigan (6–0–1) (2)	McNeese State (7–0–1)	McNeese State (8–0–1) (2)	McNeese State (9–0–1) (3)	2.
3.	Grambling (2–0) (1)	Grambling (3–0)	Grambling (4–0)	Delaware (4–0)	Eastern Michigan (4–0–1)	Akron (6–0) (2)	Delaware (6–1) (1)	Eastern Michigan (6–0–2)	Eastern Michigan (7–0–2) (1)	Eastern Michigan (7–0–2)	3.
4.	Montana (2–0)	Western Kentucky (2–0) (2)	Delaware (3–0) (2)	McNeese State (5–0)	Akron (5–0)	Eastern Michigan (5–0–1)	North Dakota (6–2) (3)	Louisiana Tech (7–1)	Tennessee State (7–1) (1)	Louisiana Tech (8–2)	4.
5.	Eastern Michigan (2–0) (1)	Montana (3–0)	Western Kentucky (3–0) (1)	Akron (4–0)	North Dakota State (5–1)	North Dakota (5–2)	Louisiana Tech (6–1)	Boise State (8–1)	Louisiana Tech (7–2)	Tennessee State (8–1) (1)	5.
6.	Western Kentucky (1–0)	Delaware (2–0)	Eastern Michigan (3–0)	Arkansas State (2–1)	Tampa (4–1)	North Dakota State (6–1)	Western Kentucky (6–1)	Tennessee State (6–1)	Western Kentucky (7–2)	Western Kentucky (8–2)	6.
7.	Delaware (1–0)	Louisiana Tech (2–0)	Eastern Kentucky (4–0)	Grambling (4–1)	North Dakota (4–2)	Tennessee State (4–1)	Tennessee State (5–1)	Western Kentucky (6–2)	Akron (7–2) т	Boise State (9–2)	7.
8.	Eastern Kentucky (2–0)	Eastern Michigan (2–0)	Montana (3–1) (1)	Tampa (3–1)	Southern Illinois (4–1)	Louisiana Tech (5–1)	Akron (6–1)	North Dakota (6–3)	Boise State (8–2) т	Akron (8–2)	8.
9.	Louisiana Tech (1–0) (1) т	Eastern Kentucky (3–0)	Akron (3–0)	Tennessee State (2–1)	Tennessee State (3–1)	Western Kentucky (5–1)	North Dakota State (6–2)	North Dakota State (7–2)	North Dakota (6–3–1)	North Dakota (6–3–1)	9.
10.	Southern Illinois (1–0) (1) т	Tennessee State (1–0)	McNeese State (4–0)	Southern Illinois (3–1) т	Louisiana Tech (4–1)	Tampa (4–2)	Boise State (7–0)	Akron (6–2)	North Dakota State (7–2)	Arkansas Tech (9–1)	10.
11.	Tennessee State (1–0)			Western Kentucky (3–1) т							11.
12.	Akron (1–0)										12.
13.	Tampa (0–1)										13.
14.	Trinity (TX) (1–0)										14.
15.	Wofford (1–1)										15.
16.	Central Connecticut State (2–0)										16.
17.	Texas A&I (0–1) т										17.
18.	Southwestern Louisiana (1–0) т										18.
19.	Morehead State (1–0) т										19.
20.	Tennessee Tech (1–0) (1)										20.
	Week 1 Sept 22	Week 2 Sept 29	Week 3 Oct 6	Week 4 Oct 13	Week 5 Oct 20	Week 6 Oct 27	Week 7 Nov 3	Week 8 Nov 10	Week 9 Nov 17	Week 10 Nov 24	
		Dropped: 10 Southern Illinois; 12 Akron; 13 Tampa; 14 Trinity (TX); 15 Wofford; 16 Central Connecticut State; 17 Texas A&I; 18 Southwestern Louisiana; 19 Morehead State; 20 Tennessee Tech	Dropped: 7 Louisiana Tech; 10 Tennessee State	Dropped: 7 Eastern Kentucky; 8 Montana	Dropped: 6 Arkansas State; 7 Grambling; 11 Western Kentucky	Dropped: 8 Southern Illinois	Dropped: 10 Tampa	None	None	Dropped: 10 North Dakota State	

== UPI coaches poll ==
	Week 1 Sept 15	Week 2 Sept 22	Week 3 Sept 29	Week 4 Oct 6	Week 5 Oct 13	Week 6 Oct 20	Week 7 Oct 27	Week 8 Nov 3	Week 9 Nov 10	Week 10 Nov 17	Week 11 Nov 24	
1.	North Dakota State (1–0) (16)	North Dakota State (2–0) (22)	North Dakota State (3–0) (17)	North Dakota State (4–0) (21)	North Dakota State (5–0) (21)	Delaware (5–0) (25)	Delaware (6–0)	Eastern Michigan (6–0–1) (14)	Delaware (7–1) (16)	Delaware (8–1) (18)	Delaware (9–1) (20)	1.
2.	Arkansas State (0–0) (3)	Arkansas State (1–0) (8)	Arkansas State (2–0) (11)	Arkansas State (2–0) (8)	Delaware (4–0) (5)	Tampa (4–1) (2)	Akron (6–0)	McNeese State (7–0) (13)	McNeese State (7–0–1) (78)	McNeese State (8–0–1) (6)	McNeese State (9–0–1) (5)	2.
3.	Tampa (0–0) (1)	Grambling (2–0) (1) т	Grambling (3–0) (1)	Grambling (4–0)	Eastern Michigan (4–0) (1)	Eastern Michigan (4–0–1)	Eastern Michigan (5–0–1)	Delaware (6–1) (3)	Eastern Michigan (6–0–2) (5)	Eastern Michigan (7–0–2) (4)	Eastern Michigan (7–0–2) (3)	3.
4.	Grambling (1–0) (2)	Montana (2–0) т	Montana (3–0) (2)	Delaware (3–0)	Drake (4–1)	Akron (5–0) (3)	McNeese State (6–0)	Western Kentucky (6–1)	Boise State (8–1) (1)	Tennessee State (7–1) (2)	Tennessee State (8–1) (1)	4.
5.	Montana (0–0)	Delaware (1–0)	Delaware (2–0)	Eastern Michigan (3–0)	Eastern Kentucky (5–0)	McNeese State (6–0) (2)	North Dakota State (6–1)	North Dakota (6–2)	Tennessee State (6–1) (2)	C.W. Post (8–1)	C.W. Post (8–1)	5.
6.	Texas A&I (0–0)	Eastern Michigan (2–0)	Eastern Michigan (2–0)	Western Kentucky (3–0) (1)	Tampa (3–1) (2)	Southern Illinois (4–1)	Weber State (5–0–1)	Akron (6–1) (1)	Louisiana Tech (7–1) (1)	Arkansas Tech (10–0)	Arkansas Tech (11–0)	6.
7.	Delaware (0–0) т	Eastern Kentucky (2–0)	Eastern Kentucky (3–0)	Eastern Kentucky (4–0)	Weber State (4–0)	Grambling (5–1)	North Dakota (5–2)	Boise State (7–1)	Arkansas Tech (9–0)	Samford (7–1)	Samford (8–1)	7.
8.	Eastern Michigan (1–0) (1) т	Western Kentucky (1–0) т	Tennessee State (1–0)	Drake (3–1)	Arkansas State (2–1)	North Dakota State (5–1)	Western Kentucky (5–1)	Tennessee State (5–1)	C.W. Post (7–1)	Northern Colorado (7–1–1)	Northern Colorado (8–1–1) (2)	8.
9.	Tennessee State (0–0)	Tennessee State (1–0) т	Western Kentucky (2–0)	Weber State (3–0) (1)	Akron (4–0)	North Dakota (4–2)	Tennessee State (4–1)	Louisiana Tech (6–1)	Western Kentucky (6–2)	Howard Payne (8–1–1)	Louisiana Tech (8–2)	9.
10.	Abilene Christian (1–0)	Florida A&M (1–0)	Louisiana Tech (2–0) (1)	Tampa (2–1)	Grambling (4–1)	Western Kentucky (4–1)	Tampa (4–2)	Weber State (5–1–1)	Northern Colorado (6–1–1) (1)	Louisiana Tech (7–2)	Howard Payne (9–1–1)	10.
11.	Long Beach State (0–1)	Southern Illinois (1–0) т	Drake (2–1)	Montana (3–1)	Southern Illinois (3–1) т	Weber State (4–0–1)	Drake (5–2)	Arkansas State (3–2)	Saint John's (MN) (8–1)	Western Kentucky (7–2)	Chico State (9–1)	11.
12.	Alcorn A&M (0–0) (1)	Boise State (2–0) т	Boise State (3–0)	Central Oklahoma (3–0)	Central Oklahoma (4–0) т	Eastern Kentucky (4–1–1)	Boise State (6–1)	Jackson State (5–1)	Southwest Texas State (6–1–1)	Southwest Texas State (7–1–1)	Western Kentucky (8–2)	12.
13.	Eastern Kentucky (1–0)	Louisiana Tech (1–0)	Tampa (1–1)	Akron (3–0) т	McNeese State (5–0) (1)	Drake (4–2)	Southwest Texas State (6–0)	Northern Colorado (5–1–1) (1)	Samford (6–1)	Chico State (8–1)	Boise State (9–2)	13.
14.	Boise State (1–0)	Tampa (0–1)	Texas A&I (1–1) (1)	McNeese State (4–0) т	Howard Payne (5–0)	Tennessee State (3–1)	Arkansas State (3–2)	Grambling (6–2)	Texas A&I (7–1)	Livingston (7–1)	Westminster (PA) (8–0)	14.
15.	Western Kentucky (0–0)	Drake (1–1)	Weber State (2–0)	Saint John's (MN) (4–0)	Western Kentucky (3–1)	Northern Colorado (3–1–1) (1)	Northern Colorado (4–1–1)	Saint John's (MN) (7–1)	Grambling (6–2)	Akron (7–2)	Southwest Texas State (8–1–1)	15.
16.	Florida A&M (0–0) т	Southwestern Louisiana (1–0)	Southwestern Louisiana (2–0)	Abilene Christian (3–1) т	Tennessee State (2–1)	Southwest Texas State (5–0)	Texas Southern (5–1)	Arkansas Tech (8–0)	Akron (6–2)	Saint John's (MN) (8–1)	Alcorn A&M (8–2) (1)	16.
17.	Southwestern Louisiana (0–0) т	Alcorn A&M (0–1) (1)	Saint John's (MN) (3–0) т	Howard Payne (4–0) т	Northern Michigan (5–0)	Boise State (5–1)	Louisiana Tech (5–1)	Baldwin–Wallace (7–0)	Chico State (7–1)	Westminster (PA) (8–0)	Livingston (8–1)	17.
18.	Northeastern Oklahoma (0–0) (1) т	Texas A&I (0–1) (1)	Central Oklahoma (2–0) т	Texas A&I (2–1) т	Northern Colorado (2–1–1) (1)	Saint John's (MN) (5–1)	Jackson State (4–1)	C.W. Post (6–1)	Jackson State (5–1–1)	Alcorn A&M (6–2) (1)	Saint John's (MN) (8–1)	18.
19.	Chattanooga (0–1) т	Concordia (MN) (2–0) т	Akron (2–0) т	Southwest Texas State (3–0) т	Boise State (4–1)	Arkansas State (2–2)	Grambling (5–2)	Tennessee Tech (6–1)	Long Beach State (6–3)	Luther (8–1) (1)	Long Beach State (8–3)	19.
20.	Southern Illinois (0–1) т	Weber State (1–0) т	Abilene Christian (2–1) т	Boise State (3–1)	Abilene Christian (4–1)	Abilene Christian (4–1)	Saint John's (MN) (6–1)	Southwest Texas State (6–1)	Luther (8–1) (1) т	Boise State (8–2)	Akron (8–2)	20.
21.									Hampden–Sydney (8–0) т			21.
	Week 1 Sept 15	Week 2 Sept 22	Week 3 Sept 29	Week 4 Oct 6	Week 5 Oct 13	Week 6 Oct 20	Week 7 Oct 27	Week 8 Nov 3	Week 9 Nov 10	Week 10 Nov 17	Week 11 Nov 24	
		Dropped: 10 Abilene Christian; 11 Long Beach State; 18 Northeastern Oklahoma; 19 Chattanooga	Dropped: 10 Florida A&M; 11 Southern Illinois; 17 Alcorn A&M; 19 Concordia (MN)	Dropped: 8 Tennessee State; 10 Louisiana Tech; 16 Southwestern Louisiana	Dropped: 11 Montana; 15 Saint John's (MN); 18 Texas A&I; 19 Southwest Texas State	Dropped: 12 Central Oklahoma; 14 Howard Payne; 17 Northern Michigan	Dropped: 6 Southern Illinois; 12 Eastern Kentucky; 20 Abilene Christian	Dropped: 5 North Dakota State; 10 Tampa; 11 Drake; 16 Texas Southern	Dropped: 5 North Dakota; 10 Weber State; 11 Arkansas State; 17 Baldwin–Wallace; 19 Tennessee Tech	Dropped: 14 Texas A&I; 15 Grambling; 18 Jackson State; 19 Long Beach State; 20 Hampden–Sydney	Dropped: 19 Luther	
