= 1970 Chattanooga Moccasins football team =

American college football season

1970 Chattanooga Moccasins football
- Conference: Independent
- Record: 3–8
- Head coach: Harold Wilkes (3rd season)
- Home stadium: Chamberlain Field

1970 NCAA College Division independents football records
	Conf.			Overall
Team	W	L	T	W		L		T
No. 4 Tampa		–		10	–	1	–	0
No. 5 Tennessee State		–		10	–	0	–	0
No. 11 Delaware		–		9	–	2	–	0
Hawaii		–		9	–	2	–	0
Northern Michigan		–		8	–	2	–	0
No. 19 Eastern Michigan		–		7	–	2	–	1
Mankato State		–		7	–	2	–	1
Akron		–		7	–	3	–	0
Central Michigan		–		7	–	3	–	0
Temple		–		7	–	3	–	0
Drake		–		7	–	4	–	0
Wayne State (MI)		–		6	–	2	–	0
Arkansas AM&N		–		6	–	3	–	0
Southern Illinois		–		6	–	3	–	0
St. Norbert		–		6	–	3	–	0
Nevada		–		6	–	3	–	1
Portland State		–		6	–	4	–	0
UNLV		–		6	–	4	–	0
Boston University		–		5	–	4	–	0
Cortland		–		5	–	4	–	0
Indiana (PA)		–		5	–	4	–	0
Santa Clara		–		5	–	4	–	1
Lafayette		–		6	–	5	–	0
Colorado College		–		4	–	4	–	0
Drexel		–		4	–	4	–	0
Hofstra		–		5	–	5	–	0
Indiana State		–		5	–	5	–	0
Samford		–		5	–	5	–	0
Wabash		–		3	–	3	–	2
Saint Mary's		–		3	–	4	–	0
Ashland		–		4	–	6	–	0
Bucknell		–		4	–	6	–	0
Lehigh		–		4	–	6	–	0
Rose Poly		–		3	–	5	–	1
Illinois College		–		3	–	5	–	0
Northeastern		–		3	–	5	–	0
Indiana Central		–		3	–	6	–	0
Lake Forest		–		3	–	6	–	0
Kentucky State		–		3	–	6	–	0
Chicago		–		2	–	5	–	0
Chattanooga		–		3	–	8	–	0
Parsons		–		2	–	7	–	0
Eastern Illinois		–		2	–	8	–	0
Milwaukee		–		1	–	9	–	0
Rankings from AP small college poll

The 1970 Chattanooga Moccasins football team was an American football team that represented the University of Tennessee at Chattanooga during the 1970 NCAA College Division football season. In their third year under head coach Harold Wilkes, the team compiled a 3–8 record.

== Schedule ==
Date	Opponent	Site	Result	Attendance	Source
September 12	at Vanderbilt	Dudley Field; Nashville, TN	L 6–39	20,862	
September 19	at Louisiana Tech	Louisiana Tech Stadium; Ruston, LA	L 3–28	12,000	
September 26	Southwestern Louisiana	Chamberlain Field; Chattanooga, TN	L 20–24		
October 3	Middle Tennessee	Chamberlain Field; Chattanooga, TN	L 8–24	7,689	
October 17	at East Tennessee State	University Stadium; Johnson City, TN	L 17–21	10,102	
October 24	at Furman	Sirrine Stadium; Greenville, SC	L 16–18		
October 31	at Tennessee Tech	Tucker Stadium; Cookeville, TN	W 21–7		
November 7	The Citadel^{†}	Chamberlain Field; Chattanooga, TN	W 29–28		
November 14	at Ole Miss	Hemingway Stadium; Oxford, MS	L 7–44	15,137	
November 21	Youngstown State	Chamberlain Field; Chattanooga, TN	W 14–10		
November 26	No. 8 Jacksonville State	Chamberlain Field; Chattanooga, TN	L 6–40		
^{†}Homecoming; Rankings from AP Poll released prior to the game
