= Milwaukee Panthers football =

University of Wisconsin-Milwaukee football team

- First season: 1899 (varsity)
- Last season: 1974 (varsity)
- Stadium: Milwaukee County Stadium (capacity: 45,768)
- Colors: Black and gold

Conference championships
- WIAC: 8 (1929, 1930, 1931, 1938, 1939, 1942, 1946, 1947)
- Fight song: UWM Fight Song

College football at the University of Wisconsin–Milwaukee traces its lineage back to 1899. The original varsity program was terminated following the 1974 season. Club football was introduced at Milwaukee in 2003.

== History ==
=== Early years (1899–1926) ===
Milwaukee Normal School, an early predecessor of UWM, fielded its first varsity football team in 1899. Clad in green and white, the team had no official nickname, but local newspapers commonly referred to squad as "Milwaukee Normals". This was a generic naming convention for normal schools at the time, akin to "Aggies" for agricultural schools or "Miners" for mining schools. Other times, they were simply referred to as "The Milwaukeeans".

An early football star for Milwaukee (1900) was Robert Zuppke. Known as "The Little Dutchman" during his days at Milwaukee, Zuppke would go on to his greatest fame as head coach at the University of Illinois at Urbana-Champaign, coaching the Fighting Illini to four national titles. He is also credited for numerous football innovations, including the offensive huddle, flea flicker, screen pass, the long snap to the punter, the linebacker position, the forward spiral pass from center, and onside kick.

In 1913, Milwaukee along with seven other colleges, formed the Wisconsin Normal Conference, the original incarnation of what is now known as the Wisconsin Intercollegiate Athletic Conference.

=== The Herman Kluge era (1927–1955) ===
In 1927, the Milwaukee Normal School became the Milwaukee State Teachers College and adopted its first official nickname, the "Green Gulls". The name was chosen because the students were often greeted by seagulls from nearby Lake Michigan as they returned to campus in the fall. They were also referred to as the "Peds" (short for "pedagogues"), a common nickname for teachers colleges at the time.

Herman Kluge, an Eastside Milwaukee native and former Green Gull football player, who graduated from Milwaukee State in 1928, returned to his alma mater as head coach in 1931. That season, the Gulls captured their third straight undisputed conference championship, a feat not repeated in the Wisconsin Intercollegiate Athletic Conference for 62 years (UW-La Crosse in 1991, 1992, and 1993). Under Kluge, Milwaukee State would also go on to capture titles in 1938, 1939, 1942, 1946 and 1947 for six of their eight total conference championships.

During this time, the Gulls shared an intense rivalry with Oshkosh State that occasionally erupted in violence. Milwaukee State's 1939 homecoming tilt between the two schools even featured an on-field fist fight between a Milwaukee State end and an Oshkosh State halfback in the third quarter. The Gulls would go on to win the game 14-7.

Kluge resigned as head football coach following the 1955 season, coinciding with the college's final year under the Milwaukee State banner, although he continued to serve as swimming coach and athletic director, posts he had held since 1931 and 1937, respectively. In 1973, he became the initial member of the UWM Athletic Hall of Fame. He was also inducted into the NAIA District 14 Hall of Fame in 1985, and the Wisconsin Football Coaches Hall of Fame in 1986.

=== The Wisconsin Extension Football Team ===
Established in 1928, University of Wisconsin's Extension division in Downtown Milwaukee fielded a varsity football team before it was merged with Milwaukee State to form the University of Wisconsin-Milwaukee. Local reporters nicknamed the squad the "Ramblers," as they did not play a home game until 1947 when it hosted Northwestern College at Wauwatosa Athletic Field (now Hart Park Stadium). The team competed in the Badger Conference, and later, the Badger-Illini Conference. The team usually found itself near the bottom of the standings.

Although the University of Wisconsin-Milwaukee considers the Wisconsin Extension to be one of its predecessor institutions, Wisconsin Extension (unlike Milwaukee Normal and Milwaukee State) is considered a separate program by the NCAA for historical purposes.

=== The lean years (1956–1969) ===
Wisconsin State College-Milwaukee (still referred to as "Milwaukee State" in local media) and the UW-Extension Milwaukee center merged in 1956 to form the current University of Wisconsin-Milwaukee. This brought changes to the team's colors (Wisconsin's cardinal red and white) and identity, as they became known as the UWM Cardinals.

The football program's fortune never fully recovered after Kluge's departure. New head coach Armin Kraeft was greeted with a winless 1956 campaign and never finished better than 4-4 during his four-year tenure. Former Chicago Bear and Green Bay Packer Wally Dreyer became head coach in 1960 and put together a string of two-win seasons before finishing 1-6-1 in 1963.

1964 brought two major changes to the program. UWM left the Wisconsin State College Conference with intentions to form a new conference with other institutions in the urban Midwest, such as Wayne State University in Detroit and the University of Illinois-Chicago Circle. These plans never were developed and the team competed as an independent for the remainder of its 10-year varsity existence.

The other change was yet another shift in the teams' colors and nickname following a student government referendum, this time to black and gold uniforms and the "Panthers" nickname, which the university's teams use to this day. On the gridiron, the Panthers continued to struggle. The program was dealt an additional blow when the team's home venue, Pearse Field, was razed to make way for an academic building, Curtin Hall.

UWM would enter the 1970s still looking for its first season above .500 since the Herman Kluge days.

=== Resurgence and termination (1970–1974) ===
After a dismal 1-9 campaign in 1970, Jerry Golembiewski's first season as Panthers' head coach, he had been an assistant coach for six years, was his last. Ironically, it was this same year in which a Milwaukee player was named a College Division All-American for the first time. That season, junior linebacker Pete Papara led the Panthers in tackles that season en route to becoming the teams' MVP. He also repeated all three feats as a senior in 1971.

Jerry Fishbain was brought in for 1971 and coached the Panthers to a respectable 5-5 mark before leading them to a 6-4 record in 1972, their first winning season as UWM and first since Herman Kluge stepped down in 1955.

While the Panthers never quite recaptured the successes as Kluge's teams, the 1970s was the era of three of the most famous Panther football alums: Mike Reinfeldt, Bill Carollo, and Dennis J. O'Boyle.

Reinfeldt, who played linebacker for the Panthers and was the teams' defensive captain as a senior in 1974, went on to an eight-year career with the NFL's Houston Oilers. Originally signed to the Oakland Raiders as a rookie free agent in 1976, he was waived in mid-season and claimed by Houston where he converted to safety and eventually won the starting job. He led the NFL in 1979 with a franchise-record 12 interceptions and was a two time All-Pro selection (1979 and 1980). Reinfeldt retired following the 1983 season, and remained the NFL's last UWM alum for 30 years until the Kansas City Chiefs signed Demetrius Harris (who played varsity basketball and club football at UWM) in 2013.

Carollo, a native of nearby Brookfield, was a four-year starter at QB for the Panthers (1970-1973), who became an NFL official for 19 seasons (1989-2008). He officiated seven conference championship games and two Super Bowls before becoming the Director of Officiating for the Big Ten Conference.

O'Boyle, the son of two U.S. Marines, was born in Milwaukee and attended the Solomon Juneau High School by way of St. Charles Boys Home, having lived in several states throughout the South due to his father's military career. O'Boyle was known for his bone-crushing tackles and is credited by the UWM coaching staff with "the best block in history" when he wiped out five players from Northern Illinois University on an end around play that sent running back Henry Jones to the end zone. After his college days, O'Boyle went on to an excellent career as a professional broadcast and public address announcer.

The Schlitz Brewing Company signed on as a sponsor for the UWM football and basketball programs in 1973. Schlitz brought on former baseball player Bob Uecker, by this point an emerging national celebrity, to call color commentary on Panthers broadcasts, which would be carried on WTMJ.

Glenn Brady became head coach in 1973 and led the Panthers to a 6-4-1 record that would prove to be their best as a varsity program under the UWM banner. Following a 4-6 campaign in 1974, its 75th at the varsity level, the UWM athletic board voted 7–6 to terminate the football program In January 1975.

== Coaching records ==
Coach	Years	Wins	Losses	Ties	Pct.
Armin Kraeft	1956–1959	9	23	--	.281
Wally Dreyer	1960–1969	27	59	2	.306
Jerry Golembiewski	1970	1	9	--	.100
Jerry Fishbain	1971–1972	11	9	--	.550
Glenn Brady	1973–1974	10	10	1	.500
Career NCAA	Totals	58	110	3

== Classifications ==
No Classification	1899-1937
NCAA College Division	1937–1972
NCAA Division III	1973–1974
No Football	1975–Present

== Stadiums ==
Pearse Field	1939–1967
Shorewood Stadium	1956–1967, 1972
Milwaukee County Stadium	1968–1971
Marquette Stadium	1973–1974

== NFL players ==
Name	Drafted	Position	Years played	Notes
Demetrius Harris	Undrafted	TE	2013–2021	Kansas City Chiefs, Cleveland Browns, Chicago Bears
Mike Reinfeldt	Undrafted	DB	1976–1983	1979 Pro Bowl and 1979, 1980 All-Pro selection
Bob Bathurst	Undrafted	DB	1971–1972	1971, 1972 Chicago Bears
Scott Levenhagen	Invited to tryout	TE	1976–1977	1977 Denver Broncos
Ken Kranz	1949 NFL draft	DB	1949	drafted in the 21st round
Clem Neacy	Undrafted	End	1924–1928
Whitey Wolter	Undrafted	DB	1924

== See also ==
- List of colleges and universities with club football teams
- List of defunct college football teams
