= 1972 Lehigh Engineers football team =

American college football season

1972 Lehigh Engineers football
- Conference: Independent
- Record: 5–6
- Head coach: Fred Dunlap (8th season)
- Offensive coordinator: John Whitehead (4th season)
- Captains: Tom Benfield; Brian Derwin
- Home stadium: Taylor Stadium

1972 NCAA College Division independents football records
	Conf.			Overall
Team	W	L	T	W		L		T
No. 4 Ashland		–		11	–	0	–	0
Bridgeport		–		11	–	0	–	0
No. 1 Delaware		–		10	–	0	–	0
No. 5 Tennessee State		–		11	–	1	–	0
Colorado College		–		8	–	1	–	0
Tampa		–		10	–	2	–	0
Trinity (TX)		–		8	–	2	–	0
Western Carolina		–		7	–	2	–	1
Hawaii		–		8	–	3	–	0
Indiana State		–		7	–	3	–	0
Northeastern		–		6	–	2	–	0
Bucknell		–		6	–	3	–	0
Cortland		–		6	–	3	–	0
San Diego		–		6	–	3	–	1
Arkansas–Pine Bluff		–		4	–	2	–	1
Eastern Michigan		–		6	–	4	–	0
Milwaukee		–		6	–	4	–	0
Samford		–		5	–	3	–	2
Ball State		–		5	–	4	–	1
Lake Forest		–		4	–	3	–	1
Nevada		–		6	–	5	–	0
Central Michigan		–		5	–	5	–	1
Rose-Hulman		–		5	–	5	–	0
Santa Clara		–		4	–	4	–	1
Akron		–		3	–	4	–	2
St. Norbert		–		4	–	5	–	0
Saint Mary's		–		3	–	4	–	0
Kentucky State		–		4	–	6	–	0
Drexel		–		3	–	6	–	0
Northeast Louisiana		–		3	–	7	–	0
Portland State		–		3	–	8	–	0
Wayne State (MI)		–		2	–	5	–	1
Boston University		–		2	–	8	–	0
Northern Michigan		–		2	–	8	–	0
Saint Peter's		–		2	–	8	–	0
Chattanooga		–		2	–	9	–	0
Southern Illinois		–		1	–	8	–	1
Eastern Illinois		–		1	–	9	–	0
Madison		–		0	–	4	–	1
UNLV		–		1	–	10	–	0
Rankings from AP small college poll

The 1972 Lehigh Engineers football team was an American football team that represented Lehigh University as an independent during the 1972 NCAA College Division football season.

In their eighth year under head coach Fred Dunlap, the Engineers compiled a 5–6 record. Tom Benfield and Brian Derwin were the team captains.

After a decisive victory over Hofstra to start the season, the Engineers briefly appeared in the UPI small college poll, ranking No. 12. A loss to No. 1 Delaware in their second matchup dropped them to No. 20, and a loss the next week to Rutgers pushed Lehigh out of the top 20 altogether. Lehigh remained unranked the rest of the year.

Lehigh played its home games at Taylor Stadium on the university campus in Bethlehem, Pennsylvania.

== Schedule ==
Date	Opponent	Site	Result	Attendance	Source
September 9	Hofstra	Taylor Stadium; Bethlehem, PA	W 44–13	7,200	
September 16	at Delaware	Delaware Stadium; Newark, DE (rivalry)	L 22–28	19,657	
September 23	at Rutgers	Rutgers Stadium; Piscataway, NJ	L 13–41	11,000	
September 30	Vermont	Taylor Stadium; Bethlehem, PA	W 26–20	5,000	
October 7	at Army	Michie Stadium; West Point, NY	L 21–26	36,000–36,310	
October 14	Bucknell	Taylor Stadium; Bethlehem, PA	W 21–0	14,000	
October 21	Penn	Taylor Stadium; Bethlehem, PA	L 27–30	14,000	
October 28	at Gettysburg	Musselman Stadium; Gettysburg, PA	L 28–30	4,400	
November 4	at Colgate	Andy Kerr Stadium; Hamilton, NY	L 34–42	2,500	
November 11	Rochester	Taylor Stadium; Bethlehem, PA	W 38–14	5,000	
November 18	at Lafayette	Fisher Field; Easton, PA (The Rivalry)	W 14–6	15,000–17,000	
