= 1969 Delaware Fightin' Blue Hens football team =

American college football season

1969 Delaware Fightin' Blue Hens football

MAC University Division champion Lambert Cup co-champion

Boardwalk Bowl, W 31–13 vs. North Carolina Central
- Conference: Middle Atlantic Conference
- University Division
- Record: 9–2 (6–0 MAC)
- Head coach: Tubby Raymond (4th season)
- Offensive coordinator: Ted Kempski (2nd season)
- Offensive scheme: Delaware Wing-T
- Base defense: 5–2
- Captain: Joe Purzycki
- Home stadium: Delaware Stadium

1969 Middle Atlantic Conference football standings
| | Conf. | | | | | Overall |
| Team | W | | L | | T | W | | L | | T |
|---|---|---|---|---|---|---|---|---|---|---|
University Division
| No. 10 Delaware x | 6 | – | 0 | – | 0 | 9 | – | 2 | – | 0 |
| Gettysburg | 4 | – | 2 | – | 0 | 7 | – | 2 | – | 0 |
| Bucknell | 3 | – | 2 | – | 1 | 3 | – | 5 | – | 1 |
| Lehigh | 2 | – | 2 | – | 0 | 4 | – | 5 | – | 1 |
| Temple | 1 | – | 2 | – | 1 | 4 | – | 5 | – | 1 |
| Lafayette | 1 | – | 3 | – | 0 | 4 | – | 6 | – | 0 |
| Hofstra | 0 | – | 5 | – | 0 | 0 | – | 10 | – | 0 |
| West Chester * | 0 | – | 1 | – | 0 | 7 | – | 2 | – | 0 |
Northern College Division
| Wilkes x | 5 | – | 0 | – | 0 | 6 | – | 2 | – | 0 |
| Susquehanna | 5 | – | 1 | – | 0 | 6 | – | 3 | – | 0 |
| Juniata | 4 | – | 2 | – | 0 | 5 | – | 3 | – | 0 |
| Delaware Valley | 4 | – | 3 | – | 0 | 4 | – | 3 | – | 0 |
| Upsala | 3 | – | 3 | – | 0 | 4 | – | 4 | – | 0 |
| Albright | 3 | – | 4 | – | 0 | 3 | – | 6 | – | 0 |
| Lycoming | 1 | – | 7 | – | 0 | 1 | – | 7 | – | 0 |
| Wagner * | 3 | – | 1 | – | 0 | 4 | – | 5 | – | 0 |
Southern College Division
| Johns Hopkins x | 5 | – | 2 | – | 0 | 5 | – | 4 | – | 0 |
| Lebanon Valley x | 5 | – | 2 | – | 0 | 6 | – | 2 | – | 0 |
| Ursinus x | 5 | – | 2 | – | 0 | 5 | – | 2 | – | 1 |
| Moravian | 6 | – | 3 | – | 0 | 6 | – | 3 | – | 0 |
| Dickinson | 4 | – | 4 | – | 0 | 4 | – | 4 | – | 0 |
| Muhlenberg | 4 | – | 5 | – | 0 | 4 | – | 5 | – | 0 |
| Swarthmore | 3 | – | 5 | – | 0 | 3 | – | 5 | – | 0 |
| Western Maryland | 2 | – | 4 | – | 0 | 3 | – | 6 | – | 0 |
| Pennsylvania Military | 1 | – | 6 | – | 0 | 2 | – | 6 | – | 0 |
| Haverford | 1 | – | 6 | – | 0 | 1 | – | 6 | – | 0 |
| Franklin & Marshall | 1 | – | 6 | – | 0 | 1 | – | 7 | – | 0 |
| Drexel* | 2 | – | 1 | – | 0 | 3 | – | 5 | – | 0 |
x – Division champion/co-champions; * – Ineligible for championship due to insufficient conference games; Rankings from AP Poll

The 1969 Delaware Fightin' Blue Hens football team was an American football team that represented the University of Delaware in the Middle Atlantic Conference during the 1969 NCAA College Division football season. In its fourth season under head coach Tubby Raymond, the team compiled a 9–2 record (6–0 against MAC opponents), won the MAC University Division championship, defeated North Carolina Central in the Boardwalk Bowl, and outscored all opponents by a total of 383 to 156. Joe Purzycki was the team captain. The team played its home games at Delaware Stadium in Newark, Delaware.

== Schedule ==
| Date | Opponent | Rank | Site | Result | Attendance | Source |
|---|---|---|---|---|---|---|
| September 20 | Gettysburg | | Delaware Stadium; Newark, DE | W 52–0 | 12,495 | |
| September 27 | Villanova | No. 8 | Delaware Stadium; Newark, DE (rivalry) | L 33–36 | 14,017 | |
| October 4 | at UMass* | No. 12 | Alumni Stadium; Hadley, MA | W 33–21 | 10,000–10,500 | |
| October 11 | at Hofstra | No. 6 | Hofstra Stadium; Hempstead, NY | W 28–13 | 2,600–2,657 | |
| October 18 | West Chester | No. 6 | Delaware Stadium; Newark, DE (rivalry) | W 24–8 | 12,706 | |
| October 25 | Temple | No. 8 | Delaware Stadium; Newark, DE | W 33–0 | 15,182 | |
| November 1 | Rutgers* | No. 7 | Delaware Stadium; Newark, DE | W 44–0 | 14,490 | |
| November 8 | Lehigh | No. 3 | Delaware Stadium; Newark, DE (rivalry) | W 42–14 | 14,093 | |
| November 15 | at Boston University* | No. 3 | Nickerson Field; Boston, MA | L 14–30 | 9,246–9,500 | |
| November 22 | at Bucknell | No. 14 | Memorial Stadium; Lewisburg, PA | W 49–21 | 5,100 | |
| December 13 | vs. North Carolina Central* | No. 10 | Atlantic City Convention Center; Atlantic City, NJ (Boardwalk Bowl) | W 31–13 | 10,585 | |
*Non-conference game; Rankings from UPI Coaches Poll released prior to the game
