= 1972 Lafayette Leopards football team =

American college football season

1972 Lafayette Leopards football
- Conference: Independent
- Record: 3–7
- Head coach: Neil Putnam (2nd season)
- Captains: Steven Huntzinger; Donald Meyer
- Home stadium: Fisher Field

1972 NCAA College Division independents football records
	Conf.			Overall
Team	W	L	T	W		L		T
No. 4 Ashland		–		11	–	0	–	0
Bridgeport		–		11	–	0	–	0
No. 1 Delaware		–		10	–	0	–	0
No. 5 Tennessee State		–		11	–	1	–	0
Colorado College		–		8	–	1	–	0
Tampa		–		10	–	2	–	0
Trinity (TX)		–		8	–	2	–	0
Western Carolina		–		7	–	2	–	1
Hawaii		–		8	–	3	–	0
Indiana State		–		7	–	3	–	0
Northeastern		–		6	–	2	–	0
Bucknell		–		6	–	3	–	0
Cortland		–		6	–	3	–	0
San Diego		–		6	–	3	–	1
Arkansas–Pine Bluff		–		4	–	2	–	1
Eastern Michigan		–		6	–	4	–	0
Milwaukee		–		6	–	4	–	0
Samford		–		5	–	3	–	2
Ball State		–		5	–	4	–	1
Lake Forest		–		4	–	3	–	1
Nevada		–		6	–	5	–	0
Central Michigan		–		5	–	5	–	1
Rose-Hulman		–		5	–	5	–	0
Santa Clara		–		4	–	4	–	1
Akron		–		3	–	4	–	2
St. Norbert		–		4	–	5	–	0
Saint Mary's		–		3	–	4	–	0
Kentucky State		–		4	–	6	–	0
Drexel		–		3	–	6	–	0
Northeast Louisiana		–		3	–	7	–	0
Portland State		–		3	–	8	–	0
Wayne State (MI)		–		2	–	5	–	1
Boston University		–		2	–	8	–	0
Northern Michigan		–		2	–	8	–	0
Saint Peter's		–		2	–	8	–	0
Chattanooga		–		2	–	9	–	0
Southern Illinois		–		1	–	8	–	1
Eastern Illinois		–		1	–	9	–	0
Madison		–		0	–	4	–	1
UNLV		–		1	–	10	–	0
Rankings from AP small college poll

The 1972 Lafayette Leopards football team was an American football team that represented Lafayette College as an independent during the 1972 NCAA College Division football season. In their second year under head coach Neil Putnam, the Leopards compiled a 3–7 record. Steven Huntzinger and Donald Meyer were the team captains. Lafayette played its home games at Fisher Field on College Hill in Easton, Pennsylvania.

== Schedule ==
Date	Opponent	Site	Result	Attendance	Source
September 16	Merchant Marine	Fisher Field; Easton, PA	W 20–13	5,000–6,000	
September 23	at Colgate	Andy Kerr Stadium; Hamilton, NY	L 14–33	5,500	
September 29	at Penn	Franklin Field; Philadelphia, PA	L 12–55	15,684	
October 7	at No. 1 Delaware	Delaware Stadium; Newark, DE	L 0–27	18,194	
October 14	at Rutgers	Rutgers Stadium; Piscataway, NJ	L 7–21	9,000–10,000	
October 21	at Bucknell	Memorial Stadium; Lewisburg, PA	L 7–26	9,500	
October 28	at Maine	Alumni Stadium; Orono, ME	L 6–16	7,588	
November 4	Gettysburg	Fisher Field; Easton, PA	W 39–25	6,000	
November 11	Drexel	Fisher Field; Easton, PA	W 16–0	1,500–4,000	
November 18	Lehigh	Fisher Field; Easton, PA (The Rivalry)	L 6–14	15,000–17,000	
Rankings from AP Poll released prior to the game
