= 1972 Delaware Fightin' Blue Hens football team =

American college football season

1972 Delaware Fightin' Blue Hens football

AP small college national champion; UPI small college national champion; Lambert Cup
- Conference: Independent
- Record: 10–0
- Head coach: Tubby Raymond (7th season)
- Offensive coordinator: Ted Kempski (5th season)
- Offensive scheme: Delaware Wing-T
- Base defense: 5–2
- Captain: Dennis Johnson
- Home stadium: Delaware Stadium

1972 NCAA College Division independents football records
	Conf.			Overall
Team	W	L	T	W		L		T
No. 4 Ashland		–		11	–	0	–	0
Bridgeport		–		11	–	0	–	0
No. 1 Delaware		–		10	–	0	–	0
No. 5 Tennessee State		–		11	–	1	–	0
Colorado College		–		8	–	1	–	0
Tampa		–		10	–	2	–	0
Trinity (TX)		–		8	–	2	–	0
Western Carolina		–		7	–	2	–	1
Hawaii		–		8	–	3	–	0
Indiana State		–		7	–	3	–	0
Northeastern		–		6	–	2	–	0
Bucknell		–		6	–	3	–	0
Cortland		–		6	–	3	–	0
San Diego		–		6	–	3	–	1
Arkansas–Pine Bluff		–		4	–	2	–	1
Eastern Michigan		–		6	–	4	–	0
Milwaukee		–		6	–	4	–	0
Samford		–		5	–	3	–	2
Ball State		–		5	–	4	–	1
Lake Forest		–		4	–	3	–	1
Nevada		–		6	–	5	–	0
Central Michigan		–		5	–	5	–	1
Rose-Hulman		–		5	–	5	–	0
Santa Clara		–		4	–	4	–	1
Akron		–		3	–	4	–	2
St. Norbert		–		4	–	5	–	0
Saint Mary's		–		3	–	4	–	0
Kentucky State		–		4	–	6	–	0
Drexel		–		3	–	6	–	0
Northeast Louisiana		–		3	–	7	–	0
Portland State		–		3	–	8	–	0
Wayne State (MI)		–		2	–	5	–	1
Boston University		–		2	–	8	–	0
Northern Michigan		–		2	–	8	–	0
Saint Peter's		–		2	–	8	–	0
Chattanooga		–		2	–	9	–	0
Southern Illinois		–		1	–	8	–	1
Illinois College		–		1	–	8	–	0
Eastern Illinois		–		1	–	9	–	0
Madison		–		0	–	4	–	1
UNLV		–		1	–	10	–	0
Rankings from AP small college poll

The 1972 Delaware Fightin' Blue Hens football team was an American football team that represented the University of Delaware as an independent during the 1972 NCAA College Division football season. In their seventh year under head coach Tubby Raymond, the Fightin' Blue Hens compiled a 10–0 record and outscored opponents by a total of 355 to 81, and was recognized as small college national champion in both the AP writers' poll and the UPI coaches poll. For the fifth straight year, they also won the Lambert Cup as the best College Division football team in the east.

The team tallied 2,879 rushing yards (287.9 yards per game) and 928 passing yards (92.8 yards per games). On defense, they held opponents to 647 rushing yards (64.7 yards per game) and 1,375 passing yards (137.5 yards per game). The individual statistical leaders included:

- Quarterback Scotty Reihm completed 46 of 77 passes for 623 yards with 10 touchdown passes.
- Fullback Roger Mason broke a school record with 45 carries against Temple. For the season, he tallied 802 yards on 171 carries.
- Halfback Vern Roberts led the team in scoring with 76 points. He tallied 802 rushing yards and 164 receiving yards. He was named ECAC Division II Rookie of the Year.
- Split end Paul Frantz led the team in receiving with 16 receptions for 170 yards.
- Defensive back John Bush led the team with five interceptions, including one that he returned 100 yards against Temple.

Three Blue Hens received first-team honors on the Division II All-ECAC team: defenseive end Joe Cabone; defensive tackle Dennis Johnson; and offensive tackle Rich Bell.

The team played its home games at Delaware Stadium in Newark, Delaware.

== Schedule ==
Date	Time	Opponent	Rank	Site	Result	Attendance	Source
September 16		Lehigh		Delaware Stadium; Newark, DE (rivalry)	W 28–22	19,657	
September 23		at Gettysburg	No. 1	Musselman Stadium; Gettysburg, PA	W 64–7	5,200	
September 30		Boston University	No. 1	Delaware Stadium; Newark, DE	W 49–12	15,552	
October 7		Lafayette^{†}	No. 1	Delaware Stadium; Newark, DE	W 27–0	18,194	
October 14		at Connecticut	No. 1	Memorial Stadium; Storrs, CT	W 32–7	13,141	
October 21		West Chester	No. 2	Delaware Stadium; Newark, DE (rivalry)	W 31–14	19,216	
October 28		at Temple	No. 1	Temple Stadium; Philadelphia, PA	W 28–9	9,000–14,363	
November 4	1:30 p.m.	at Villanova	No. 1	Villanova Stadium; Villanova, PA (rivalry)	W 14–7	11,402	
November 11		Maine	No. 1	Delaware Stadium; Newark, DE	W 62–0	18,016	
November 18		Bucknell	No. 1	Delaware Stadium; Newark, DE	W 20–3	22,000–22,648	
^{†}Homecoming; Rankings from AP Poll released prior to the game; All times are in Eastern time
