= 1969 Lehigh Engineers football team =

American college football season

1969 Lehigh Engineers football

Middle Three Conference champion
- Conference: Middle Atlantic Conference
- University Division
- Record: 4–5–1 (2–2 MAC)
- Head coach: Fred Dunlap (5th season)
- Offensive coordinator: John Whitehead (1st season)
- Captains: Mike Leib; Pete Tomaino
- Home stadium: Taylor Stadium

1969 Middle Atlantic Conference football standings
	Conf.					Overall
Team	W		L		T	W		L		T
University Division
No. 10 Delaware x	6	–	0	–	0	9	–	2	–	0
Gettysburg	4	–	2	–	0	7	–	2	–	0
Bucknell	3	–	2	–	1	3	–	5	–	1
Lehigh	2	–	2	–	0	4	–	5	–	1
Temple	1	–	2	–	1	4	–	5	–	1
Lafayette	1	–	3	–	0	4	–	6	–	0
Hofstra	0	–	5	–	0	0	–	10	–	0
West Chester *	0	–	1	–	0	7	–	2	–	0
Northern College Division
Wilkes x	5	–	0	–	0	6	–	2	–	0
Susquehanna	5	–	1	–	0	6	–	3	–	0
Juniata	4	–	2	–	0	5	–	3	–	0
Delaware Valley	4	–	3	–	0	4	–	3	–	0
Upsala	3	–	3	–	0	4	–	4	–	0
Albright	3	–	4	–	0	3	–	6	–	0
Lycoming	1	–	7	–	0	1	–	7	–	0
Wagner *	3	–	1	–	0	4	–	5	–	0
Southern College Division
Johns Hopkins x	5	–	2	–	0	5	–	4	–	0
Lebanon Valley x	5	–	2	–	0	6	–	2	–	0
Ursinus x	5	–	2	–	0	5	–	2	–	1
Moravian	6	–	3	–	0	6	–	3	–	0
Dickinson	4	–	4	–	0	4	–	4	–	0
Muhlenberg	4	–	5	–	0	4	–	5	–	0
Swarthmore	3	–	5	–	0	3	–	5	–	0
Western Maryland	2	–	4	–	0	3	–	6	–	0
Pennsylvania Military	1	–	6	–	0	2	–	6	–	0
Haverford	1	–	6	–	0	1	–	6	–	0
Franklin & Marshall	1	–	6	–	0	1	–	7	–	0
Drexel*	2	–	1	–	0	3	–	5	–	0
x – Division champion/co-champions; * – Ineligible for championship due to insufficient conference games; Rankings from AP Poll

The 1969 Lehigh Engineers football team was an American football team that represented Lehigh University during the 1969 NCAA College Division football season, and completed the 86th season of Engineers football. Lehigh finished fourth in the Middle Atlantic Conference, University Division, and won the Middle Three Conference championship.

The 1969 team came off a 3–7 record from the previous season. The team was led by coach Fred Dunlap. The team finished the regular season with a 4–5–1 record. Mike Leib and Pete Tomaino were the team captains.

To kick off its conference schedule, Lehigh scored a significant upset against Rutgers, dealing the Scarlet Knights their first loss during college football's centennial season, the 100th anniversary of the 1869 game between Rutgers and Princeton that is considered the sport's first intercollegiate matchup. Dunlap compared the 17–7 victory to Lehigh's best season in recent memory: "We beat Columbia, Colgate and Harvard in 1961, our Lambert Cup year and this is the greatest football triumph for us since then."

The Engineers beat both of their Middle Three rivals, Rutgers and Lafayette, to win the conference championship. The Engineers were 2–2 against MAC University Division opponents, earning fourth place in that conference.

Lehigh played its home games at Taylor Stadium on the university campus in Bethlehem, Pennsylvania.

== Schedule ==
Date	Opponent	Site	Result	Attendance	Source
September 20	The Citadel*	Taylor Stadium; Bethlehem, PA	L 16–41	10,000	
September 27	Ithaca*	Taylor Stadium; Bethlehem, PA	W 55–7	6,500	
October 4	at Wittenberg*	Wittenberg Stadium; Springfield, OH	L 13–21	5,500	
October 11	at Rutgers	Rutgers Stadium; Piscataway, NJ	W 17–7	16,000–17,000	
October 18	at Penn*	Franklin Field; Philadelphia, PA	L 7–13	27,000–27,002	
October 25	Gettysburg	Taylor Stadium; Bethlehem, PA	L 24–36	10,500	
November 1	Colgate*	Taylor Stadium; Bethlehem, PA	T 14–14	7,500	
November 8	at No. 4 Delaware	Delaware Stadium; Newark, DE (rivalry)	L 14–42	14,093	
November 15	at Bucknell	Memorial Stadium; Lewisburg, PA	W 7–3	4,100	
November 22	Lafayette	Taylor Stadium; Bethlehem, PA (The Rivalry)	W 36–19	16,000	
*Non-conference game; Rankings from UPI Poll released prior to the game
