= 1969 Temple Owls football team =

American college football season

1969 Temple Owls football
- Conference: Middle Atlantic Conference
- University Division
- Record: 4–5–1 (1–2–1 MAC)
- Head coach: George Makris (10th season)
- Home stadium: Temple Stadium

1969 Middle Atlantic Conference football standings
	Conf.					Overall
Team	W		L		T	W		L		T
University Division
No. 10 Delaware x	6	–	0	–	0	9	–	2	–	0
Gettysburg	4	–	2	–	0	7	–	2	–	0
Bucknell	3	–	2	–	1	3	–	5	–	1
Lehigh	2	–	2	–	0	4	–	5	–	1
Temple	1	–	2	–	1	4	–	5	–	1
Lafayette	1	–	3	–	0	4	–	6	–	0
Hofstra	0	–	5	–	0	0	–	10	–	0
West Chester *	0	–	1	–	0	7	–	2	–	0
Northern College Division
Wilkes x	5	–	0	–	0	6	–	2	–	0
Susquehanna	5	–	1	–	0	6	–	3	–	0
Juniata	4	–	2	–	0	5	–	3	–	0
Delaware Valley	4	–	3	–	0	4	–	3	–	0
Upsala	3	–	3	–	0	4	–	4	–	0
Albright	3	–	4	–	0	3	–	6	–	0
Lycoming	1	–	7	–	0	1	–	7	–	0
Wagner *	3	–	1	–	0	4	–	5	–	0
Southern College Division
Johns Hopkins x	5	–	2	–	0	5	–	4	–	0
Lebanon Valley x	5	–	2	–	0	6	–	2	–	0
Ursinus x	5	–	2	–	0	5	–	2	–	1
Moravian	6	–	3	–	0	6	–	3	–	0
Dickinson	4	–	4	–	0	4	–	4	–	0
Muhlenberg	4	–	5	–	0	4	–	5	–	0
Swarthmore	3	–	5	–	0	3	–	5	–	0
Western Maryland	2	–	4	–	0	3	–	6	–	0
Pennsylvania Military	1	–	6	–	0	2	–	6	–	0
Haverford	1	–	6	–	0	1	–	6	–	0
Franklin & Marshall	1	–	6	–	0	1	–	7	–	0
Drexel*	2	–	1	–	0	3	–	5	–	0
x – Division champion/co-champions; * – Ineligible for championship due to insufficient conference games; Rankings from AP Poll

The 1969 Temple Owls football team was an American football team that represented Temple University as a member of the Middle Atlantic Conference (MAC) during the 1969 NCAA College Division football season. In its tenth and final season under head coach George Makris, the team compiled a 4–5–1 record (1–2–1 against MAC opponents). The team played its home games at Temple Stadium in Philadelphia.

Makris resigned at the end of the 1969 season. He compiled a 45–44–4 record in 10 years as Temple's head football coach.

== Schedule ==
Date	Time	Opponent	Site	Result	Attendance	Source
September 20		at Rhode Island*	Meade Stadium; Kingston, RI	W 47–3	7,000–7,318	
September 27		William & Mary*	Temple Stadium; Philadelphia, PA	L 6–7	12,000	
October 4		Wayne State (MI)*	Temple Stadium; Philadelphia, PA	W 34–0	9,000	
October 11		at Bucknell	Memorial Stadium; Lewisburg, PA	T 7–7	10,500	
October 18		Hofstra^{†}	Temple Stadium; Philadelphia, PA	W 34–7	10,500–12,500	
October 25		at Delaware	Delaware Stadium; Newark, DE	L 0–33	15,182	
November 1	1:30 p.m.	at Buffalo*	Rotary Field; Buffalo, NY	L 0–33	7,351	
November 8		Gettysburg	Temple Stadium; Philadelphia, PA	L 14–16	7,500	
November 15		at Northeastern*	Parsons Field; Brookline, MA	W 35–17	4,200–4,238	
November 22		at Boston University*	Nickerson Field; Boston, MA	L 3–21	3,500–5,000	
*Non-conference game; ^{†}Homecoming; All times are in Eastern time
