= 1969 Drexel Dragons football team =

American college football season

1969 Drexel Dragons football
- Conference: Middle Atlantic Conference
- Southern College Division
- Record: 3–5 (2–1 MAC)
- Head coach: Sterling Brown (1st season)
- Home stadium: Drexel Field

1969 Middle Atlantic Conference football standings
	Conf.					Overall
Team	W		L		T	W		L		T
University Division
No. 10 Delaware x	6	–	0	–	0	9	–	2	–	0
Gettysburg	4	–	2	–	0	7	–	2	–	0
Bucknell	3	–	2	–	1	3	–	5	–	1
Lehigh	2	–	2	–	0	4	–	5	–	1
Temple	1	–	2	–	1	4	–	5	–	1
Lafayette	1	–	3	–	0	4	–	6	–	0
Hofstra	0	–	5	–	0	0	–	10	–	0
West Chester *	0	–	1	–	0	7	–	2	–	0
Northern College Division
Wilkes x	5	–	0	–	0	6	–	2	–	0
Susquehanna	5	–	1	–	0	6	–	3	–	0
Juniata	4	–	2	–	0	5	–	3	–	0
Delaware Valley	4	–	3	–	0	4	–	3	–	0
Upsala	3	–	3	–	0	4	–	4	–	0
Albright	3	–	4	–	0	3	–	6	–	0
Lycoming	1	–	7	–	0	1	–	7	–	0
Wagner *	3	–	1	–	0	4	–	5	–	0
Southern College Division
Johns Hopkins x	5	–	2	–	0	5	–	4	–	0
Lebanon Valley x	5	–	2	–	0	6	–	2	–	0
Ursinus x	5	–	2	–	0	5	–	2	–	1
Moravian	6	–	3	–	0	6	–	3	–	0
Dickinson	4	–	4	–	0	4	–	4	–	0
Muhlenberg	4	–	5	–	0	4	–	5	–	0
Swarthmore	3	–	5	–	0	3	–	5	–	0
Western Maryland	2	–	4	–	0	3	–	6	–	0
Pennsylvania Military	1	–	6	–	0	2	–	6	–	0
Haverford	1	–	6	–	0	1	–	6	–	0
Franklin & Marshall	1	–	6	–	0	1	–	7	–	0
Drexel*	2	–	1	–	0	3	–	5	–	0
x – Division champion/co-champions; * – Ineligible for championship due to insufficient conference games; Rankings from AP Poll

The 1969 Drexel Dragons football team represented the Drexel Institute of Technology (renamed Drexel University in 1970) as a member of the Southern College Division of the Middle Atlantic Conference (MAC) during the 1969 NCAA College Division football season. In their first year under head coach Sterling Brown, the Dragons compiled an overall record of 3–5 with a 2–1 mark in conference play. Drexel did not play enough conference games to qualify for the championship.

== Schedule ==
Date	Opponent	Site	Result	Attendance	Source
September 27	Tufts*	Drexel Field; Philadelphia, PA	L 13–29	3,800	
October 4	Southern Connecticut*	Drexel Field; Philadelphia, PA	W 14–7	2,400	
October 11	at Lafayette*	Fisher Field; Easton, PA	L 7–27	4,000	
October 18	at Gettysburg*	Gettysburg, PA	L 8–34	2,100	
October 25	Albright^{†}	Drexel Field; Philadelphia, PA	L 21–28	7,000	
November 1	at Pennsylvania Military	Campus Field; Chester, PA	W 16–10	1,800	
November 8	Delaware Valley	Drexel Field; Philadelphia, PA	W 13–7	2,100	
November 15	Merchant Marine*	Drexel Field; Philadelphia, PA	L 23–48	1,900	
*Non-conference game; ^{†}Homecoming
