= 1969 Lafayette Leopards football team =

American college football season

1969 Lafayette Leopards football
- Conference: Middle Atlantic Conference
- University Division
- Record: 4–6 (1–3 MAC)
- Head coach: Harry Gamble (3rd season)
- Captains: Gary Kolarik; Robert Zimmers
- Home stadium: Fisher Field

1969 Middle Atlantic Conference football standings
	Conf.					Overall
Team	W		L		T	W		L		T
University Division
No. 10 Delaware x	6	–	0	–	0	9	–	2	–	0
Gettysburg	4	–	2	–	0	7	–	2	–	0
Bucknell	3	–	2	–	1	3	–	5	–	1
Lehigh	2	–	2	–	0	4	–	5	–	1
Temple	1	–	2	–	1	4	–	5	–	1
Lafayette	1	–	3	–	0	4	–	6	–	0
Hofstra	0	–	5	–	0	0	–	10	–	0
West Chester *	0	–	1	–	0	7	–	2	–	0
Northern College Division
Wilkes x	5	–	0	–	0	6	–	2	–	0
Susquehanna	5	–	1	–	0	6	–	3	–	0
Juniata	4	–	2	–	0	5	–	3	–	0
Delaware Valley	4	–	3	–	0	4	–	3	–	0
Upsala	3	–	3	–	0	4	–	4	–	0
Albright	3	–	4	–	0	3	–	6	–	0
Lycoming	1	–	7	–	0	1	–	7	–	0
Wagner *	3	–	1	–	0	4	–	5	–	0
Southern College Division
Johns Hopkins x	5	–	2	–	0	5	–	4	–	0
Lebanon Valley x	5	–	2	–	0	6	–	2	–	0
Ursinus x	5	–	2	–	0	5	–	2	–	1
Moravian	6	–	3	–	0	6	–	3	–	0
Dickinson	4	–	4	–	0	4	–	4	–	0
Muhlenberg	4	–	5	–	0	4	–	5	–	0
Swarthmore	3	–	5	–	0	3	–	5	–	0
Western Maryland	2	–	4	–	0	3	–	6	–	0
Pennsylvania Military	1	–	6	–	0	2	–	6	–	0
Haverford	1	–	6	–	0	1	–	6	–	0
Franklin & Marshall	1	–	6	–	0	1	–	7	–	0
Drexel*	2	–	1	–	0	3	–	5	–	0
x – Division champion/co-champions; * – Ineligible for championship due to insufficient conference games; Rankings from AP Poll

The 1969 Lafayette Leopards football team was an American football team that represented Lafayette College during the 1969 NCAA College Division football season. Lafayette placed sixth in the Middle Atlantic Conference, University Division, and finished last in the Middle Three Conference.

In their third year under head coach Harry Gamble, the Leopards compiled a 4–6 record. Robert Zimmers and Gary Kolarik were the team captains.

In conference play, Lafayette's 1–3 record against MAC University Division opponents was the third-worst in the eight-team circuit, half a game behind Temple (1–2–1). Lafayette lost to both of its Middle Three rivals, Rutgers and conference champion Lehigh.

Lafayette played its home games at Fisher Field on College Hill in Easton, Pennsylvania.

== Schedule ==
Date	Opponent	Site	Result	Attendance	Source
September 20	Rutgers	Fisher Field; Easton, PA	L 22–44	10,000	
September 27	at Columbia*	Baker Field; New York, NY	W 36–22	7,626–7,676	
October 4	at Hofstra	Hofstra Stadium; Hempstead, NY	W 41–25	3,500	
October 11	Drexel*	Fisher Field; Easton, PA	W 27–7	8,000	
October 18	Boston University*	Fisher Field; Easton, PA	L 14–22	9,000	
October 25	Bucknell^{†}	Fisher Field; Easton, PA	L 20–21	11,000	
November 1	at Gettysburg	Musselman Stadium; Gettysburg, PA	L 10–19	4,020	
November 8	Vermont*	Centennial Field; Burlington, VT	W 28–17	6,500–6,950	
November 15	Colgate*	Fisher Field; Easton, PA	L 10–14	4,000–6,500	
November 22	at Lehigh	Taylor Stadium; Bethlehem, PA (The Rivalry)	L 19–36	16,000	
*Non-conference game; ^{†}Homecoming
