= Sterling Brown =

Sterling Brown may refer to:

- Sterling Allen Brown (1901–1989), American academic, poet and writer
- Sterling K. Brown (born 1976), American actor
- Sterling Brown (American football) (born c. 1938), American football coach
- Sterling Brown (basketball) (born 1995), American basketball player

== See also ==
- Sterling Brown Hendricks (1902–1981), American agriculturist
