= 1969 Bucknell Bison football team =

American college football season

1969 Bucknell Bison football
- Conference: Middle Atlantic Conference
- University Division
- Record: 3–5–1 (3–2–1 MAC)
- Head coach: Fred Prender (1st season)
- Captains: Randy Ruger; Dave Vassar
- Home stadium: Memorial Stadium

1969 Middle Atlantic Conference football standings
	Conf.					Overall
Team	W		L		T	W		L		T
University Division
No. 10 Delaware x	6	–	0	–	0	9	–	2	–	0
Gettysburg	4	–	2	–	0	7	–	2	–	0
Bucknell	3	–	2	–	1	3	–	5	–	1
Lehigh	2	–	2	–	0	4	–	5	–	1
Temple	1	–	2	–	1	4	–	5	–	1
Lafayette	1	–	3	–	0	4	–	6	–	0
Hofstra	0	–	5	–	0	0	–	10	–	0
West Chester *	0	–	1	–	0	7	–	2	–	0
Northern College Division
Wilkes x	5	–	0	–	0	6	–	2	–	0
Susquehanna	5	–	1	–	0	6	–	3	–	0
Juniata	4	–	2	–	0	5	–	3	–	0
Delaware Valley	4	–	3	–	0	4	–	3	–	0
Upsala	3	–	3	–	0	4	–	4	–	0
Albright	3	–	4	–	0	3	–	6	–	0
Lycoming	1	–	7	–	0	1	–	7	–	0
Wagner *	3	–	1	–	0	4	–	5	–	0
Southern College Division
Johns Hopkins x	5	–	2	–	0	5	–	4	–	0
Lebanon Valley x	5	–	2	–	0	6	–	2	–	0
Ursinus x	5	–	2	–	0	5	–	2	–	1
Moravian	6	–	3	–	0	6	–	3	–	0
Dickinson	4	–	4	–	0	4	–	4	–	0
Muhlenberg	4	–	5	–	0	4	–	5	–	0
Swarthmore	3	–	5	–	0	3	–	5	–	0
Western Maryland	2	–	4	–	0	3	–	6	–	0
Pennsylvania Military	1	–	6	–	0	2	–	6	–	0
Haverford	1	–	6	–	0	1	–	6	–	0
Franklin & Marshall	1	–	6	–	0	1	–	7	–	0
Drexel*	2	–	1	–	0	3	–	5	–	0
x – Division champion/co-champions; * – Ineligible for championship due to insufficient conference games; Rankings from AP Poll

The 1969 Bucknell Bison football team was an American football team that represented Bucknell University during the 1969 NCAA College Division football season. Bucknell placed third in the Middle Atlantic Conference, University Division.

In their first year under head coach Fred Prender, the Bison compiled a 3–5–1 record. Randy Ruger and Dave Vassar were the team captains.

With a 3–2–1 record against MAC University Division opponents, the Bison narrowly missed second place in the division, finishing half a game behind 4–2 Gettysburg.

Bucknell played its home games at Memorial Stadium on the university campus in Lewisburg, Pennsylvania.

== Schedule ==
Date	Opponent	Site	Result	Attendance	Source
September 20	at Hofstra	Hofstra Stadium; Hempstead, NY	W 24–19	4,200	
September 27	at Penn*	Franklin Field; Philadelphia, PA	L 17–28	14,136	
October 4	at Gettysburg	Musselman Stadium; Gettysburg, PA	W 24–21	5,200–5,385	
October 11	Temple^{†}	Memorial Stadium; Lewisburg, PA	T 7–7	10,500	
October 25	at Lafayette	Fisher Field; Easton, PA	W 21–20	10,300–11,000	
November 1	Wittenberg^*	Memorial Stadium; Lewisburg, PA	L 6–45	9,000–10,000	
November 8	at Colgate*	Andy Kerr Stadium; Hamilton, NY	L 7–28	2,500	
November 15	Lehigh	Memorial Stadium; Lewisburg, PA	L 3–7	4,100	
November 22	No. 10 Delaware	Memorial Stadium; Lewisburg, PA	L 21–49	5,100	
*Non-conference game; ^{†}Homecoming; ^ Parents Weekend; Rankings from UPI Poll released prior to the game
