= Frederick Dunlap =

Frederick Dunlap may refer to:

- Fred Dunlap (1859–1902), second baseman and manager in Major League Baseball
- Frederick Dunlap (American football) (born 1928), college football coach
