= 1969 Hofstra Flying Dutchmen football team =

American college football season

1969 Hofstra Flying Dutchmen football
- Conference: Middle Atlantic Conference
- University Division
- Record: 0–10 (0–5 MAC)
- Head coach: Howdy Myers (20th season)
- Captains: Tom Dempsey; John Dobson; Joe Hunter; Tom Mulrooney
- Home stadium: Hofstra Stadium

1969 Middle Atlantic Conference football standings
	Conf.					Overall
Team	W		L		T	W		L		T
University Division
No. 10 Delaware x	6	–	0	–	0	9	–	2	–	0
Gettysburg	4	–	2	–	0	7	–	2	–	0
Bucknell	3	–	2	–	1	3	–	5	–	1
Lehigh	2	–	2	–	0	4	–	5	–	1
Temple	1	–	2	–	1	4	–	5	–	1
Lafayette	1	–	3	–	0	4	–	6	–	0
Hofstra	0	–	5	–	0	0	–	10	–	0
West Chester *	0	–	1	–	0	7	–	2	–	0
Northern College Division
Wilkes x	5	–	0	–	0	6	–	2	–	0
Susquehanna	5	–	1	–	0	6	–	3	–	0
Juniata	4	–	2	–	0	5	–	3	–	0
Delaware Valley	4	–	3	–	0	4	–	3	–	0
Upsala	3	–	3	–	0	4	–	4	–	0
Albright	3	–	4	–	0	3	–	6	–	0
Lycoming	1	–	7	–	0	1	–	7	–	0
Wagner *	3	–	1	–	0	4	–	5	–	0
Southern College Division
Johns Hopkins x	5	–	2	–	0	5	–	4	–	0
Lebanon Valley x	5	–	2	–	0	6	–	2	–	0
Ursinus x	5	–	2	–	0	5	–	2	–	1
Moravian	6	–	3	–	0	6	–	3	–	0
Dickinson	4	–	4	–	0	4	–	4	–	0
Muhlenberg	4	–	5	–	0	4	–	5	–	0
Swarthmore	3	–	5	–	0	3	–	5	–	0
Western Maryland	2	–	4	–	0	3	–	6	–	0
Pennsylvania Military	1	–	6	–	0	2	–	6	–	0
Haverford	1	–	6	–	0	1	–	6	–	0
Franklin & Marshall	1	–	6	–	0	1	–	7	–	0
Drexel*	2	–	1	–	0	3	–	5	–	0
x – Division champion/co-champions; * – Ineligible for championship due to insufficient conference games; Rankings from AP Poll

The 1969 Hofstra Flying Dutchmen football team was an American football team that represented Hofstra University during the 1969 NCAA College Division football season. Hofstra lost every game and finished last in the Middle Atlantic Conference, University Division.

In their 20th year under head coach Howard "Howdy" Myers Jr., the Flying Dutchmen compiled an 0–10 record, and were outscored 283 to 175. Tom Dempsey, John Dobson, Joe Hunter and Tom Mulrooney were the team captains. This was Hofstra's first-ever winless season.

Hofstra (0–5) was one of two MAC University Division teams with winless conference records; the other was West Chester, which played only one game in the division and would not have been eligible for the championship.

The Flying Dutchmen played their home games at Hofstra Stadium on the university's Hempstead campus on Long Island, New York.

== Schedule ==
Date	Opponent	Site	Result	Attendance	Source
September 20	Bucknell	Hofstra Stadium; Hempstead, NY	L 19–24	4,000–4,200	
September 27	Gettysburg	Hofstra Stadium; Hempstead, NY	L 13–30	4,300	
October 4	Lafayette	Hofstra Stadium; Hempstead, NY	L 25–41	3,500	
October 11	No. 8 Delaware	Hofstra Stadium; Hempstead, NY	L 13–28	2,600–2,657	
October 18	at Temple	Temple Stadium; Philadelphia, PA	L 7–34	10,500–12,500	
October 25	Bridgeport*	Hofstra Stadium; Hempstead, NY	L 19–21	5,300	
November 1	at Maine*	Alumni Field; Orono, ME	L 34–40	4,300–5,500	
November 8	at Merchant Marine*	Tomb Field; Kings Point, NY	L 13–21	7,000	
November 15	at Wagner*	Wagner College Stadium; Staten Island, NY	L 12–14	3,500	
November 27	C.W. Post*	Hofstra Stadium; Hempstead, NY	L 20–30	5,200	
*Non-conference game; Rankings from UPI Poll released prior to the game
