= Tubby Raymond =

American football, baseball player and coach

Biographical details
- Born: November 14, 1925; Flint, Michigan, U.S.
- Died: December 8, 2017 (aged 92); Newark, Delaware, U.S.

Playing career

Football
- 1946, 1948: Michigan

Baseball
- 1949: Michigan
- 1950: Clarksdale Planters
- 1951: Flint Arrows
- Positions: Quarterback, linebacker (football)

Coaching career (HC unless noted)

Football
- 1949–1950: University HS (MI)
- 1951–1953: Maine (line)
- 1954–1965: Delaware (backfield)
- 1966–2001: Delaware

Baseball
- 1952–1953: Maine
- 1956–1964: Delaware

Head coaching record
- Overall: 300–119–3 (college football); 164–72–3 (baseball); 12–4 (high school football)
- Bowls: 4–1
- Tournaments: Football; 7–4 (NCAA D-II playoffs); 11–11 (NCAA D-I-AA playoffs)

Accomplishments and honors

Championships
- Football; 2 NCAA College Division (1970–1971); 1 NCAA Division II (1979); 3 Middle Atlantic (1966, 1968–1969); 5 Yankee (1986, 1988, 1991–1992, 1995); 1 A-10 (2000)

Awards
- Football; 2× AFCA College Division COY (1971–1972)
- College Football Hall of Fame; Inducted in 2003 (profile)

Harold Rupert "Tubby" Raymond (November 14, 1925 – December 8, 2017) was an American football and baseball player and coach. He served as the head football coach at the University of Delaware from 1966 to 2001, compiling a record of 300–119–3. Raymond was also the head baseball coach at the University of Maine from 1952 to 1953 and at Delaware from 1956 to 1964, tallying a career college baseball mark of 164–72–3. He was inducted into the College Football Hall of Fame as a coach in 2003.

== Playing career ==
Raymond, a native of Flint, Michigan, played quarterback and linebacker at the University of Michigan under Fritz Crisler. He also played baseball at Michigan and was the captain of the baseball team in 1949. He played minor league baseball in 1950 with the Clarksdale Planters and in 1951 with the Flint Arrows.

== Coaching career ==
Raymond began his coaching career in 1949 as the head football and assistant boys' basketball coach at University High School in Ann Arbor, Michigan. He succeeded another former Michigan football player, Henry Fonde. His football compiled identical 6–2 records in his two seasons as head coach and won a conference title in 1949.

In 1951, Raymond became an assistant at the University of Maine. He moved to Delaware in 1954 as a backfield coach under David M. Nelson, who had also played at Michigan. When Nelson stood down in 1966 to focus on his duties as athletic director, Raymond succeeded Nelson as head football coach. He retired after 36 seasons with a 300–119–3 record, three national titles (1971, 1972, 1979), 14 Lambert Cup trophies, 23 post-season bids and four consecutive victories in the Boardwalk Bowl. After classifications were formed in the early 1970s, Delaware was a Division II program until elevating to Division I-AA in 1981. At the time of his retirement, more than half of Blue Hens' all-time victories in the 110-year history of their program had been tallied under Raymond. On March 5, 2002, K. C. Keeler, former Blue Hens linebacker and head football coach at Rowan University, succeeded Raymond at Delaware.

Use of "Delaware Wing T" offense

A formation similar to the Flexbone, though much older, is known as the "Delaware Wing-T" was created by longtime University of Delaware coach and NCAA Rules Committee chairman David M. Nelson, and perfected by his successor Tubby Raymond. It has become a very popular offense with high schools and small colleges. It was designed at the time to be a mix between the single wing and T-formation. It took the motion and run-strength of the single wing, and the QB-under-center from the T. In this variation, there is only one wing back, with the other back lined up next to the fullback on the opposite side from the wing back. However, the Wing Back may also line up diagonally from the Tight End. He may be used as an extra blocker or a receiver. He may come in motion for running plays.

=== 300th win ===
Going into the 2001 season, Raymond needed just four wins to reach the 300 mark. At the first game of the season, a banner hung above the stadium listing the numbers 297, 298, 299 and 300. As each win was accomplished, the respective number was crossed off.

Raymond's 300th win came during the last home game of the season on November 10 with a 10–6 victory against the Richmond Spiders. As the clock wound down in the game, the crowd began chanting "Tubby, Tubby". Raymond made a short, humble speech and was carried off the field by his team as a construction worker climbed onto a cherry-picker to cross off the final number on the poster.

The following is an excerpt from Raymond's speech to Delaware fans after his 300th victory:

"I have to apologize for paraphrasing, but I feel a little bit like Lou Gehrig. I'm the luckiest man on the face of the earth. First, I'd like to thank the Delaware fans who have been here for so many years. I know there are things that happen that you don't like. There are things that happen that I don't like. But the thing that's there all the time is you. You're at every football game. You're excited about being here, and you truly made Delaware football something we can all be proud of. Thank you very much."

Delaware lost its final game of the season on the road against Villanova and, that winter, Raymond announced his retirement, ending his career at an even 300 wins.

== Awards and honors ==
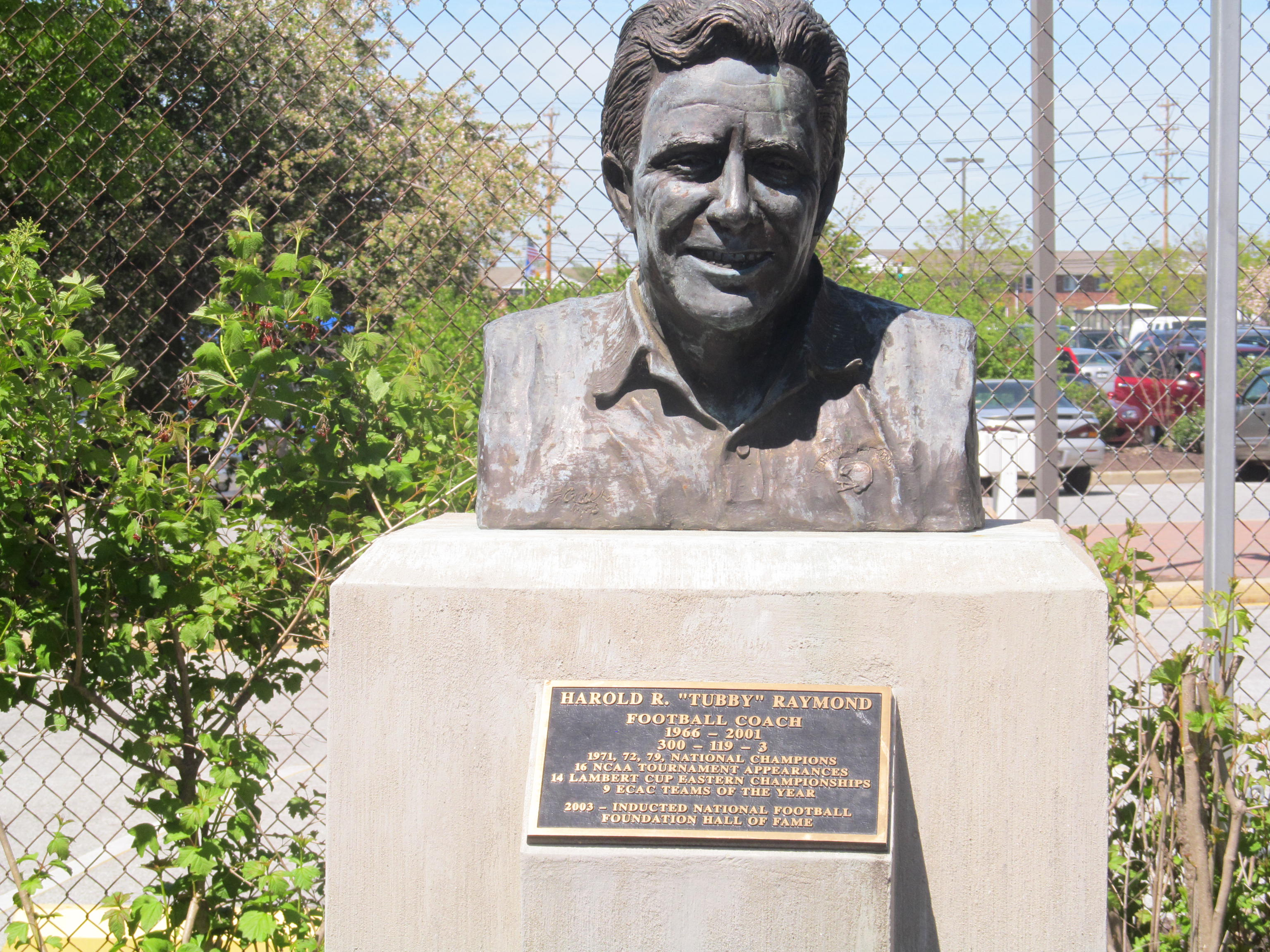
A bust of Tubby Raymond at Delaware Stadium with a plaque on his 300 wins, 3 National Championships, and College Hall of Fame induction

In 1993, the Delaware Sports Museum and Hall of Fame inducted Raymond. On August 29, 2002, the playing surface at Delaware Stadium, which was opened in 1952 (Raymond's second year), was renamed Tubby Raymond Field in his honor.

== Outside of football ==
=== Political activity ===
Raymond became involved in Delaware politics, and remained active even after retiring to Landenberg, Pennsylvania. Because he was well-known and liked in Delaware, his endorsement was sought out by candidates. Raymond was a staunch conservative; he described himself as "just to the right of Genghis Khan."

Despite his conservative views, Raymond long supported Democrat Jack Markell more out of loyalty than because of political views. As a boy, Markell grew up seven houses away from the Raymonds and the two remained friends. When Markell ran for state treasurer, Raymond taped radio ads supporting him. In 2007, Markell named Raymond an honorary co-chair of his 2008 gubernatorial bid. Markell became the 73rd Governor of Delaware in January 2009.

=== Painting ===
Raymond was an accomplished painter. While coaching at Delaware, he began a tradition of painting a Blue Hen player each week of the season. Even after retiring from coaching, he continued to paint each senior Blue Hen player.

=== Family ===
Harold was married twice and had four children. His first wife, Suzanne became deaf as an adult after a bout with Ménière's disease and died from a brain tumor (glioblastoma) in 1990. His two sons were David Raymond, the original Phillie Phanatic, and Chris Raymond, the former head football coach at Colby College. He resided in Landenberg, Pennsylvania with his second wife, Diane.

=== Death ===
Raymond died on December 8, 2017, at Christiana Hospital from complications after a brief illness. He was 92 years old.

On January 12, 2018, the University of Delaware hosted a celebration of Raymond's life at the Bob Carpenter Center. Speakers included University president Dennis Assanis, former Vice President Joe Biden (who played freshman football at Delaware), NFL MVP Rich Gannon

== Head coaching record ==
=== Football ===
Year	Team	Overall	Conference	Standing	Bowl/playoffs	NCAA^{#}	TSN^{°}
Delaware Fightin' Blue Hens (Middle Atlantic Conference) (1966–1969)
1966	Delaware	6–3	6–0	1st (University)			
1967	Delaware	2–7	2–3	4th (University)			
1968	Delaware	8–3	5–0	1st (University)	W Boardwalk		
1969	Delaware	9–2	6–0	1st (University)	W Boardwalk		
Delaware Fightin' Blue Hens (NCAA College Division / NCAA Division II independent) (1970–1979)
1970	Delaware	9–2			W Boardwalk		
1971	Delaware	10–1			W Boardwalk		
1972	Delaware	10–0					
1973	Delaware	8–4			L Boardwalk (NCAA D-II Quarterfinal)		
1974	Delaware	12–2			W Grantland Rice (NCAA D-II Semifinal), L Camellia (NCAA D-II Final)		
1975	Delaware	8–3					
1976	Delaware	8–3–1			L NCAA Division II Quarterfinal		
1977	Delaware	6–3–1					
1978	Delaware	10–4			L NCAA Division II Championship		
1979	Delaware	13–1			W NCAA Division II Championship		
Delaware Fightin' Blue Hens (NCAA Division I-AA independent) (1980–1985)
1980	Delaware	9–2				6	
1981	Delaware	9–3			L NCAA Division I-AA Quarterfinal	7	
1982	Delaware	12–2			L NCAA Division I-AA Championship	3	
1983	Delaware	4–7					
1984	Delaware	8–3				19	
1985	Delaware	7–4					
Delaware Fightin' Blue Hens (Yankee Conference) (1986–1996)
1986	Delaware	9–4	5–2	T–1st	L NCAA Division I-AA Quarterfinal	13	
1987	Delaware	5–6	2–5	T–5th			
1988	Delaware	7–5	6–2	T–1st	L NCAA Division I-AA First Round		
1989	Delaware	7–4	5–3	T–4th			
1990	Delaware	6–5	5–3	T–2nd			
1991	Delaware	10–2	7–1	T–1st	L NCAA Division I-AA First Round	6	
1992	Delaware	11–3	7–1	1st	L NCAA Division I-AA Semifinal	8	
1993	Delaware	9–4	6–2	2nd (Mid-Atlantic)	L NCAA Division I-AA Quarterfinal		18
1994	Delaware	7–3–1	5–3	3rd (Mid-Atlantic)			
1995	Delaware	11–2	8–0	1st (Mid-Atlantic)	L NCAA Division I-AA Quarterfinal		7
1996	Delaware	8–4	6–2	T–2nd (Mid-Atlantic)	L NCAA Division I-AA First Round		11
Delaware Fightin' Blue Hens (Atlantic 10 Conference) (1997–2001)
1997	Delaware	12–2	7–1	2nd (Mid-Atlantic)	L NCAA Division I-AA Semifinal		3
1998	Delaware	7–4	4–4	T–2nd (Mid-Atlantic)			22
1999	Delaware	7–4	5–3	T–4th			
2000	Delaware	12–2	7–1	T–1st	L NCAA Division I-AA Semifinal		3
2001	Delaware	4–6	4–5	T–6th			
Delaware:		300–119–3	108–41				
Total:		300–119–3					
National championship Conference title Conference division title or championship game berth

=== Baseball ===
Below is a table of Raymond's yearly records as a collegiate head baseball coach.

Record table
Season	Team	Overall	Conference	Standing	Postseason
Maine Black Bears (Yankee Conference) (1952–1954)
1952	Maine	11–10–1	3–2	3rd	
1953	Maine	11–7	2–2	T–3rd	
1954	Maine	14–9	3–3	3rd	
Maine:		36–26–1	8–7		
Delaware Fightin' Blue Hens (Middle Atlantic Conference) (1956–1964)
1956	Delaware	14–2		1st	NCAA Regional
1957	Delaware	14–6			
1958	Delaware	19–3		1st	
1959	Delaware	15–4			
1960	Delaware	14–8–1		1st	NCAA Regional
1961	Delaware	17–8–1		1st	NCAA Regional
1962	Delaware	17–7			
1963	Delaware	15–10			
1964	Delaware	17–7		1st	
Delaware:		142–55–2			
Total:		178–81–3			
National champion Postseason invitational champion Conference regular season champion Conference regular season and conference tournament champion Division regular season champion Division regular season and conference tournament champion Conference tournament champion

== See also ==
- List of college football career coaching wins leaders
- List of presidents of the American Football Coaches Association
