= 1972 Bucknell Bison football team =

American college football season

1972 Bucknell Bison football
- Conference: Independent
- Record: 6–3
- Head coach: Fred Prender (4th season)
- Captains: Steve Eck; Gerry Solomon
- Home stadium: Memorial Stadium

1972 NCAA College Division independents football records
	Conf.			Overall
Team	W	L	T	W		L		T
No. 4 Ashland		–		11	–	0	–	0
Bridgeport		–		11	–	0	–	0
No. 1 Delaware		–		10	–	0	–	0
No. 5 Tennessee State		–		11	–	1	–	0
Colorado College		–		8	–	1	–	0
Tampa		–		10	–	2	–	0
Trinity (TX)		–		8	–	2	–	0
Western Carolina		–		7	–	2	–	1
Hawaii		–		8	–	3	–	0
Indiana State		–		7	–	3	–	0
Northeastern		–		6	–	2	–	0
Bucknell		–		6	–	3	–	0
Cortland		–		6	–	3	–	0
San Diego		–		6	–	3	–	1
Arkansas–Pine Bluff		–		4	–	2	–	1
Eastern Michigan		–		6	–	4	–	0
Milwaukee		–		6	–	4	–	0
Samford		–		5	–	3	–	2
Ball State		–		5	–	4	–	1
Lake Forest		–		4	–	3	–	1
Nevada		–		6	–	5	–	0
Central Michigan		–		5	–	5	–	1
Rose-Hulman		–		5	–	5	–	0
Santa Clara		–		4	–	4	–	1
Akron		–		3	–	4	–	2
St. Norbert		–		4	–	5	–	0
Saint Mary's		–		3	–	4	–	0
Kentucky State		–		4	–	6	–	0
Drexel		–		3	–	6	–	0
Northeast Louisiana		–		3	–	7	–	0
Portland State		–		3	–	8	–	0
Wayne State (MI)		–		2	–	5	–	1
Boston University		–		2	–	8	–	0
Northern Michigan		–		2	–	8	–	0
Saint Peter's		–		2	–	8	–	0
Chattanooga		–		2	–	9	–	0
Southern Illinois		–		1	–	8	–	1
Eastern Illinois		–		1	–	9	–	0
Madison		–		0	–	4	–	1
UNLV		–		1	–	10	–	0
Rankings from AP small college poll

The 1972 Bucknell Bison football team was an American football team that represented Bucknell University as an independent during the 1972 NCAA College Division football season.

In their fourth year under head coach Fred Prender, the Bison compiled a 6–3 record. Steve Eck and Gerry Solomon were the team captains.

Bucknell played its home games at Memorial Stadium on the university campus in Lewisburg, Pennsylvania.

== Schedule ==
Date	Opponent	Site	Result	Attendance	Source
September 23	Drexel	Memorial Stadium; Lewisburg, PA	W 44–0	7,500	
September 30	at Maine	Alfond Stadium; Orono, ME	W 17–14	5,000–5,500	
October 7	Gettysburg^{†}	Memorial Stadium; Lewisburg, PA	W 23–0	8,100	
October 14	at Lehigh	Taylor Stadium; Bethlehem, PA	L 0–21	14,000	
October 21	Lafayette^	Memorial Stadium; Lewisburg, PA	W 26–7	9,500	
October 28	at Davidson	Richardson Stadium; Davidson, NC	L 21–25	3,500–4,000	
November 4	No. 6 UMass	Memorial Stadium; Lewisburg, PA	W 28–15	6,800	
November 11	Colgate	Memorial Stadium; Lewisburg, PA	W 41–7	5,200	
November 18	at No. 1 Delaware	Delaware Stadium; Newark, DE	L 3–20	22,000–22,648	
^{†}Homecoming; ^ Parents Weekend; Rankings from UPI Poll released prior to the game
