= Chris Raymond =

American football coach (born 1953/54)

Biographical details
- Born: 1953 or 1954 (age 72–73); Bangor, Maine, U.S.
- Education: University of Virginia

Playing career
- 1974: Virginia
- Position: Kicker

Coaching career (HC unless noted)
- 1976: Trinity (CT) (GA)
- 1977–1978: Tufts (assistant)
- 1979–1980: Delaware (assistant)
- 1981–1982: Maine (assistant)
- 1983–1985: Colby
- 1995: Delaware Diamondbacks

Head coaching record
- Overall: 5–19

Harold "Chris" Raymond is an American former football player and coach. He was a placekicker for Newark High School and the University of Virginia. He then served as an assistant for Trinity, Tufts, Delaware, and Maine. From 1983 to 1985 he was the head football coach at Colby College in Waterville, Maine, where he compiled a record of 5–19. After leaving Colby, Raymond worked for J.P. Morgan & Co. In 1995 he was head coach of the Delaware Diamondbacks of the Atlantic Football League. He is the son of longtime Delaware Blue Hens football coach Harold "Tubby" Raymond.
