= 1969 Wittenberg Tigers football team =

American college football season

1969 Wittenberg Tigers football

OAC champion

Amos Alonzo Stagg Bowl, W 27–21 vs. William Jewell
- Conference: Ohio Athletic Conference
- Record: 10–0 (4–0 OAC)
- Head coach: Dave Maurer (1st season)

1969 Ohio Athletic Conference football standings
	Conf.					Overall
Team	W		L		T	W		L		T
No. 13 Wittenberg $	4	–	0	–	0	10	–	0	–	0
Marietta	6	–	1	–	0	8	–	1	–	0
Baldwin–Wallace	4	–	1	–	1	7	–	1	–	1
Denison	4	–	2	–	0	7	–	2	–	0
Muskingum	3	–	1	–	2	5	–	2	–	2
Kenyon	3	–	2	–	0	6	–	3	–	0
Ohio Wesleyan	4	–	3	–	0	5	–	4	–	0
Mount Union	3	–	3	–	0	5	–	4	–	0
Capital	3	–	4	–	0	3	–	4	–	1
Wooster	3	–	4	–	0	3	–	6	–	0
Hiram	2	–	5	–	0	3	–	5	–	0
Otterbein	1	–	4	–	1	3	–	5	–	1
Heidelberg	0	–	4	–	2	0	–	6	–	2
Oberlin	0	–	6	–	0	2	–	6	–	0
$ – Conference champion; Rankings from AP small college poll

The 1969 Wittenberg Tigers football team was an American football team that represented Wittenberg University in the Ohio Athletic Conference (OAC) during the 1969 NCAA College Division football season. In their first year under head coach Dave Maurer, the Tigers compiled a perfect 10–0 record, won the OAC championship, and defeated William Jewell, 27–21, in the Amos Alonzo Stagg Bowl.

Linebacker Larry Peacock was selected by the Associated Press as a first-team player on the 1969 All-OAC football team. Five others were named to the second team: offensive guard Tom Young; running back Darryl Herring; defensive end Denny Yontz; defensive tackle Bill Bibbee; and defensive back Jack Mackan. Quarterback Rocky Alt received honorable mention.

The 1969 season was the conclusion of a decade in which Wittenberg compiled a record of 69–9–1.

== Schedule ==
Date	Opponent	Rank	Site	Result	Attendance	Source
September 27	at Capital		Columbus, OH	W 20–18	3,300	
October 4	Lehigh*		Springfield, OH	W 21–13	5,500	
October 11	Grove City*	No. 20	Springfield, OH	W 24–7	2,500	
October 18	at Heidelberg		Tiffin, OH	W 41–9	3.000	
October 25	Baldwin–Wallace	No. 18	Springfield, OH	W 16–12	6,500	
November 1	at Bucknell*	No. 15	Lewisburg, PA	W 45–6	9,000–10,000	
November 8	Wooster	No. T–9	Springfield, OH	W 14–13	4,000	
November 15	at Ashland*	No. 18	Ashland, OH	W 33–16	2,100	
November 22	Wagner*	No. 11	Springfield, OH	W 56–0	4,000	
November 29	William Jewell*	No. 13	Springfield, OH (Amos Alonzo Stagg Bowl)	W 27–21	4,500	
*Non-conference game; Rankings from AP Poll released prior to the game
