= 1973 Drexel Dragons football team =

American college football season

1973 Drexel Dragons football
- Conference: Independent
- Record: 4–4
- Head coach: Sterling Brown (5th season)
- Home stadium: Drexel Field

1973 NCAA Division II independents football records
	Conf.			Overall
Team	W	L	T	W		L		T
No. 1 Tennessee State		–		10	–	0	–	0
No. 9 Hawaii		–		9	–	2	–	0
Nebraska–Omaha		–		7	–	2	–	1
Trinity (TX)		–		8	–	3	–	0
UNLV		–		8	–	3	–	0
No. 13 Delaware ^		–		8	–	4	–	0
Western Carolina		–		6	–	3	–	1
Central Michigan		–		7	–	4	–	0
Nevada		–		7	–	4	–	0
Western Illinois		–		7	–	4	–	0
Milwaukee		–		6	–	4	–	1
Eastern Michigan		–		6	–	4	–	0
American International		–		5	–	4	–	0
Akron		–		6	–	5	–	0
Central State (OH)		–		6	–	5	–	0
Ball State		–		5	–	5	–	1
Wayne State (MI)		–		5	–	5	–	0
Drexel		–		4	–	4	–	0
Bucknell		–		3	–	4	–	2
Northeast Louisiana		–		3	–	5	–	2
Santa Clara		–		4	–	6	–	0
Youngstown State		–		4	–	6	–	0
Arkansas–Pine Bluff		–		3	–	5	–	1
Chattanooga		–		4	–	7	–	0
Indiana State		–		4	–	7	–	0
Northeastern		–		3	–	6	–	0
Kentucky State		–		3	–	8	–	0
Northern Michigan		–		2	–	7	–	1
Eastern Illinois		–		2	–	9	–	0
Portland State		–		1	–	10	–	0
^ – NCAA Division II playoff participant; Rankings from AP small college poll

The 1973 Drexel Dragons football team was an American football team that represented Drexel University as an independent during the 1973 NCAA Division II football season. In their fifth year under head coach Sterling Brown, the team compiled an overall record of 4–4.

== Schedule ==
Date	Opponent	Site	Result	Attendance	Source
September 29	at Fordham	Coffey Field; Bronx, NY	W 27–0	2,000	
October 6	at RPI	'86 Field; Troy, NY	W 27–14	1,000	
October 13	Merchant Marine	Drexel Field; Philadelphia, PA	L 7–20	2,000	
October 20	Gettysburg	Drexel Field; Philadelphia, PA	W 28–24	4,000	
October 27	C. W. Post	Drexel Field; Philadelphia, PA	L 15–16	2,000	
November 3	Albright	Drexel Field; Philadelphia, PA	W 16–7	1,500	
November 10	at Lafayette	Fisher Field; Easton, PA	L 11–21	3,100	
November 17	at Coast Guard	Cadet Memorial Field; New London, CT	L 0–9	2,000	
