= Fred Prender =

American baseball player and football coach (1931–1975)

Biographical details
- Born: September 19, 1931; Washington, D.C., U.S.
- Died: April 8, 1975 (aged 43); Lewisburg, Pennsylvania, U.S.

Playing career

Football
- 1950–1953: West Chester

Baseball
- 1954: Thetford Mines Miners
- Position: Back (football)

Coaching career (HC unless noted)

Football
- 1959–1962: Bucknell (backfield)
- 1963–1968: Juniata
- 1969–1974: Bucknell

Wrestling
- 1961–1963: Bucknell

Head coaching record
- Overall: 53–50–3 (football)

Accomplishments and honors

Championships
- Football; 1 MAC Northern College Division (1967)

Frederick Wayland Prender (September 19, 1931 – April 8, 1975) was an American college football coach and minor league baseball player. He served as the head football coach at Juniata College from 1963 to 1968 and Bucknell University from 1969 to 1974, compiling a career college football coach record of 53–50–3. A college football]player at West Chester University, Prender was drafted by the Pittsburgh Steelers in 1954.

== Head coaching record ==
=== Football ===
Year	Team	Overall	Conference	Standing	Bowl/playoffs
Juniata Indians (Middle Atlantic Conference) (1963–1968)
1963	Juniata	5–3	3–1	NA (Northern College)	
1964	Juniata	4–4	3–3	3rd (Northern College)	
1965	Juniata	3–5	3–2	4th (Northern College)	
1966	Juniata	4–4	3–3	T–5th (Northern College)	
1967	Juniata	7–1	5–0	T–1st (Northern College)	
1968	Juniata	7–2	4–2	4th (Northern College)	
Juniata:		30–19	21–11		
Bucknell Bison (Middle Atlantic Conference) (1969)
1969	Bucknell	3–5–1	3–2–1	3rd (University)	
Bucknell Bison (NCAA College Division / Division II independent) (1970–1974)
1970	Bucknell	4–6			
1971	Bucknell	5–5			
1972	Bucknell	6–3			
1973	Bucknell	3–4–2			
1974	Bucknell	2–8			
Bucknell:		21–31–3			
Total:		53–50–3			
National championship Conference title Conference division title or championship game berth
