= Boardwalk Bowl =

Boardwalk Bowl (defunct)
- "Little Army-Navy Game" (1961–1967); NCAA College Division regional final (1968–1972); NCAA Division II quarterfinal (1973)
- Stadium: Atlantic City Convention Hall
- Location: Atlantic City, New Jersey
- Operated: 1961–1973

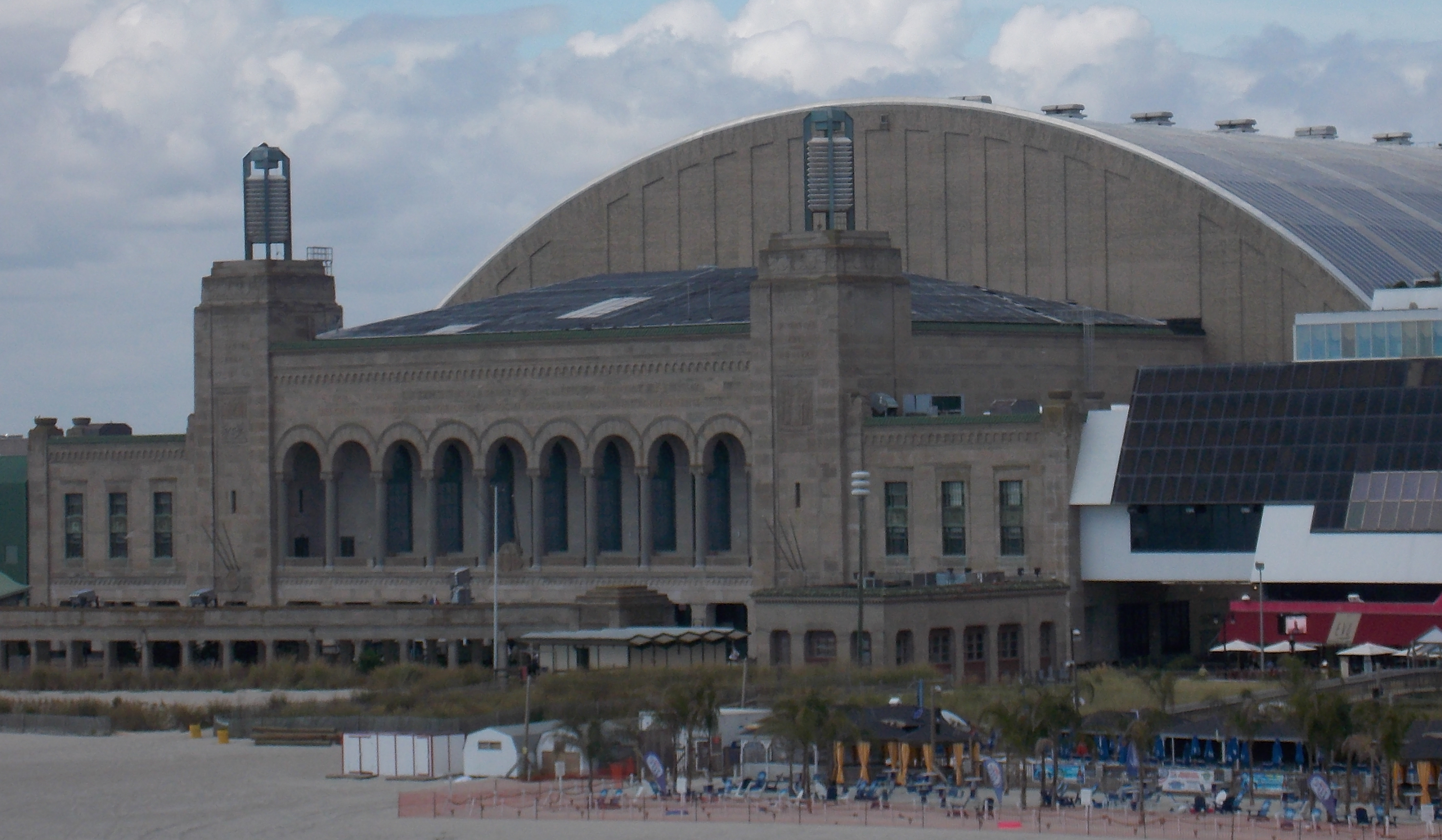
Atlantic City Convention Hall

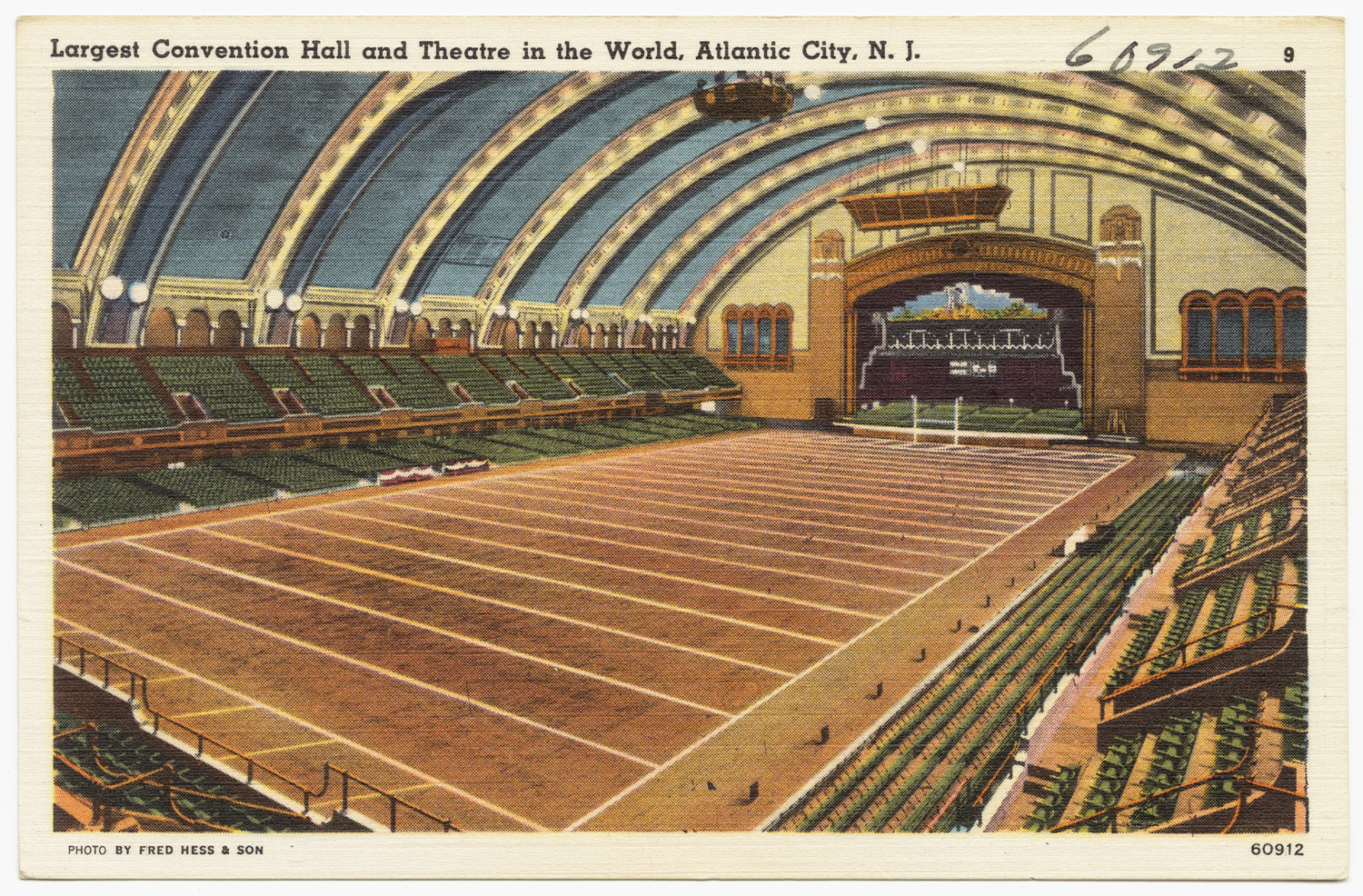
Convention Hall football field, postcard image

The Boardwalk Bowl was a postseason college football game held indoors at the former Atlantic City Convention Hall (now Boardwalk Hall) in Atlantic City, New Jersey, from 1961 to 1973.

== History ==
Convention Hall was built in the late 1920s and hosted indoor college football games as early as 1930, but the venue did not have a perennial football event until the Boardwalk Bowl. While earlier contests had been played on dirt, the playing surface for the bowl games consisted of natural grass sod that was grown outside and then moved indoors for the game. From 1961 through 1967, the bowl matched Pennsylvania Military College (now Widener University) against the United States Merchant Marine Academy in what was known as the "Little Army–Navy Game." Merchant Marine won six of the seven games in the series.

In 1968, the Boardwalk Bowl succeeded the Tangerine Bowl as one of the four regional finals in the College Division (which became Division II and Division III in 1973). The other three regionals were the Pecan (later Pioneer), Grantland Rice, and Camellia bowls. During these years, the bowl sought to match the two best non-major teams in a 17-state Eastern Region stretching from New England to Florida. Delaware secured a bid to the game in four consecutive years (1968 through 1971) and won all four games.

In 1973, under the new Division II playoff system, the Boardwalk Bowl became a national quarterfinal, while the other three quarterfinals were nameless and played at campus sites. The semifinals were the Pioneer and Grantland Rice bowls, and the Camellia was the championship game. Grambling defeated Delaware in the only Boardwalk Bowl played under this format. The game was discontinued after 1973, when the NCAA made all of its quarterfinals unnamed games at campus venues; after 1977 the semifinals likewise were unnamed (though the D-II championship game remained a "bowl" through 1985).

The Boardwalk Bowl shared Convention Hall with the Liberty Bowl in 1964, a transition year between that bowl game's original home in Philadelphia and eventual site in Memphis. From 1970 through 1972, the Knute Rockne Bowl, which matched top programs from among the smallest eastern NCAA College Division schools, was also played in Convention Hall. In those three seasons, the two bowls were played two weeks apart.

== Game results ==
Date	Winner		Loser		Game
December 2, 1961	Pennsylvania Military	35	Merchant Marine	14	Little Army–Navy Game
December 1, 1962	Merchant Marine	9	Pennsylvania Military	0	Little Army–Navy Game
November 30, 1963	Merchant Marine	27	Pennsylvania Military	13	Little Army–Navy Game
November 28, 1964	Merchant Marine	20	Pennsylvania Military	16	Little Army–Navy Game
November 27, 1965	Merchant Marine	22	Pennsylvania Military	12	Little Army–Navy Game
November 26, 1966	Merchant Marine	46	Pennsylvania Military	7	Little Army–Navy Game
November 25, 1967	Merchant Marine	39	Pennsylvania Military	6	Little Army–Navy Game
December 14, 1968	Delaware	31	Indiana (PA)	24	NCAA College Division; Regional Final
December 13, 1969	Delaware	31	North Carolina Central	13	NCAA College Division; Regional Final
December 12, 1970	Delaware	38	Morgan State	23	NCAA College Division; Regional Final
December 11, 1971	Delaware	72	C.W. Post	22	NCAA College Division; Regional Final
December 9, 1972	UMass	35	UC Davis	14	NCAA College Division; Regional Final
December 1, 1973	Grambling	17	Delaware	8	NCAA Division II Quarterfinal

== See also ==
- List of college bowl games
