= 1972 Drexel Dragons football team =

American college football season

1972 Drexel Dragons football
- Conference: Independent
- Record: 3–6
- Head coach: Sterling Brown (4th season)
- Home stadium: Drexel Field

1972 NCAA College Division independents football records
	Conf.			Overall
Team	W	L	T	W		L		T
No. 4 Ashland		–		11	–	0	–	0
Bridgeport		–		11	–	0	–	0
No. 1 Delaware		–		10	–	0	–	0
No. 5 Tennessee State		–		11	–	1	–	0
Colorado College		–		8	–	1	–	0
Tampa		–		10	–	2	–	0
Trinity (TX)		–		8	–	2	–	0
Western Carolina		–		7	–	2	–	1
Hawaii		–		8	–	3	–	0
Indiana State		–		7	–	3	–	0
Northeastern		–		6	–	2	–	0
Bucknell		–		6	–	3	–	0
Cortland		–		6	–	3	–	0
San Diego		–		6	–	3	–	1
Arkansas–Pine Bluff		–		4	–	2	–	1
Eastern Michigan		–		6	–	4	–	0
Milwaukee		–		6	–	4	–	0
Samford		–		5	–	3	–	2
Ball State		–		5	–	4	–	1
Lake Forest		–		4	–	3	–	1
Nevada		–		6	–	5	–	0
Central Michigan		–		5	–	5	–	1
Rose-Hulman		–		5	–	5	–	0
Santa Clara		–		4	–	4	–	1
Akron		–		3	–	4	–	2
St. Norbert		–		4	–	5	–	0
Saint Mary's		–		3	–	4	–	0
Kentucky State		–		4	–	6	–	0
Drexel		–		3	–	6	–	0
Northeast Louisiana		–		3	–	7	–	0
Portland State		–		3	–	8	–	0
Wayne State (MI)		–		2	–	5	–	1
Boston University		–		2	–	8	–	0
Northern Michigan		–		2	–	8	–	0
Saint Peter's		–		2	–	8	–	0
Chattanooga		–		2	–	9	–	0
Southern Illinois		–		1	–	8	–	1
Eastern Illinois		–		1	–	9	–	0
Madison		–		0	–	4	–	1
UNLV		–		1	–	10	–	0
Rankings from AP small college poll

The 1972 Drexel Dragons football team was an American football team that represented Drexel University as an independent during the 1972 NCAA College Division football season. In their fourth year under head coach Sterling Brown, the team compiled an overall record of 3–6.

== Schedule ==
Date	Opponent	Site	Result	Attendance	Source
September 23	at Bucknell	Memorial Stadium; Lewisburg, PA	L 0–44	5,000	
September 30	at Wagner	Wagner College Stadium; Staten Island, NY	L 7–9	1,500	
October 7	RPI	Drexel Field; Philadelphia, PA	L 7–9	2,000	
October 14	at Merchant Marine	Kings Point, NY	L 6–16	3,500	
October 21	at Gettysburg	Memorial Field; Gettysburg, PA	L 29–31	5,000	
October 28	Fordham	Drexel Field; Philadelphia, PA	W 15–0	2,500	
November 4	at Albright	Albright Stadium; Reading, PA (Pretzel Bowl)	W 30–7	5,000	
November 11	at Lafayette	Fisher Field; Easton, PA	L 0–16	1,500	
November 18	Coast Guard	Drexel Field; Philadelphia, PA	W 35–12	2,000	
