= Frederick Dunlap (American football) =

American football coach and college athletics administrator

Biographical details
- Born: April 18, 1928 (age 98)

Coaching career (HC unless noted)
- 1959–1964: Cornell (assistant)
- 1965–1975: Lehigh
- 1976–1987: Colgate

Administrative career (AD unless noted)
- 1976–1992: Colgate

Head coaching record
- Overall: 126–111–5
- Tournaments: 0–2 (NCAA D-II playoffs); 1–2 (NAA D-I-AA playoffs)

Accomplishments and honors

Championships
- 5 Middle Three (1965, 1969–1971, 1975)

Awards
- Walter Camp Man of the Year (1977)

Frederick H. Dunlap (born April 18, 1928) is an American former football coach and college athletics administrator. He served as the head football coach at Lehigh University from 1965 to 1975 and at Colgate University from 1976 to 1987, compiling career college football record of 126–111–5. Dunlap was the athletic director at Colgate from 1976 to 1992.

== Coaching career ==
=== Lehigh ===
Dunlap was the 23rd head football coach at Lehigh University and he held that position for 11 seasons, from 1965 until 1975. His coaching record at Lehigh was 49–62–2.

=== Colgate ===
Dunlap was the 29th head football coach at Colgate University. He held that position for 12 seasons, from 1976 until 1987. His coaching record at Colgate was 77–49–3.

== Head coaching record ==
Year	Team	Overall	Conference	Standing	Bowl/playoffs	NCAA^{#}
Lehigh Engineers (Middle Atlantic Conference / Middle Three Conference) (1965–1969)
1965	Lehigh	1–8	/ 1–1	(University) / T–1st		
1966	Lehigh	0–9	/ 0–2	(University) / 3rd		
1967	Lehigh	1–8	/ 0–2	(University) / 3rd		
1968	Lehigh	3–7	/ 1–1	(University) / 2nd		
1969	Lehigh	4–5–1	/ 2–0	(University) / 1st		
Lehigh Engineers (Middle Three Conference) (1970–1975)
1970	Lehigh	4–6	1–1	T–1st		
1971	Lehigh	8–3	2–0	1st		
1972	Lehigh	5–6	1–1	2nd		
1973	Lehigh	7–4–1	1–1	2nd	L NCAA Division II Quarterfinal	
1974	Lehigh	7–3	1–1	2nd		
1975	Lehigh	9–3	2–0	1st	L NCAA Division II Quarterfinal	
Lehigh:		49–62–2				
Colgate Red Raiders (NCAA Division I / I-A independent) (1976–1981)
1976	Colgate	8–2				
1977	Colgate	10–1				
1978	Colgate	3–8				
1979	Colgate	5–4–1				
1980	Colgate	5–4–1				
1981	Colgate	7–3				
Colgate Red Raiders (NCAA Division I-AA independent) (1982–1987)
1982	Colgate	8–4			L NCAA Division I-AA Quarterfinal	9
1983	Colgate	8–4			L NCAA Division I-AA First Round	7
1984	Colgate	5–5				
1985	Colgate	7–3–1				
1986	Colgate	4–7				
1987	Colgate	7–4				
Colgate:		77–49–3				
Total:		126–111–5				
National championship Conference title Conference division title or championship game berth
^{#}NCAA Poll.
