= Sterling Brown (American football) =

American football coach and college athletics administrator

Biographical details
- Born: c. 1938 (age 87–88)

Playing career
- 1957–1960: East Stroudsburg
- Position: Guard

Coaching career (HC unless noted)
- 1961–1962: Sleepy Hollow HS (NY) (assistant)
- 1963: East Stroudsburg (assistant)
- 1964–1965: Hofstra (assistant)
- 1966: Navy (assistant)
- 1967–1968: Villanova (assistant)
- 1969–1973: Drexel
- 1974–1976: Penn (offensive backfield)
- 1977–1979: Wyoming (RB)
- 1980–1981: Temple (assistant)
- 1982–1987: Ursinus

Administrative career (AD unless noted)
- 1988–1994: South Carolina (assistant AD)
- 1994: Virginia Tech (associate AD)
- 1997–2003: Georgia Tech (sr. associate AD)

Head coaching record
- Overall: 38–56–2

Sterling R. Brown (born c. 1938) is an American former football coach and college athletics administrator. He served as the head football coach at Drexel University in Philadelphia, Pennsylvania from 1969 to 1973 and Ursinus College in Collegeville, Pennsylvania from 1982 to 1987, compiling a career college football coaching record of 38–56–2. Brown was last head coach in the history of the Drexel Dragons football program.

Brown graduated from East Stroudsburg University of Pennsylvania in 1961.

== Head coaching record ==
| Year | Team | Overall | Conference | Standing | Bowl/playoffs |
|---|---|---|---|---|---|
Drexel Dragons (Middle Atlantic Conference) (1969)
| 1969 | Drexel | 3–5 | 2–1 | NA (Southern College) | |
Drexel Dragons (NCAA College Division / Division II independent) (1970–1973)
| 1970 | Drexel | 4–4 | | | |
| 1971 | Drexel | 2–6 | | | |
| 1972 | Drexel | 3–6 | | | |
| 1973 | Drexel | 4–4 | | | |
| Drexel: | | 16–24 | 2–3 | | |
Ursinus Bears (Middle Atlantic Conference) (1982)
| 1982 | Ursinus | 3–5–1 | 3–4–1 | 6th (Southern) | |
Ursinus Bears (Centennial Conference) (1983–1987)
| 1983 | Ursinus | 4–5 | 2–5 | 7th | |
| 1984 | Ursinus | 4–5 | 2–5 | T–6th | |
| 1985 | Ursinus | 5–4 | 3–4 | T–5th | |
| 1986 | Ursinus | 3–6–1 | 2–4–1 | T–5th | |
| 1987 | Ursinus | 3–6 | 2–5 | 6th | |
| Ursinus: | | 22–31–2 | 14–25–2 | | |
| Total: | | 38–56–2 | | | |
