= 1972 Eastern Illinois Panthers football team =

American college football season

1972 Eastern Illinois Panthers football
- Conference: Independent
- Record: 1–9
- Head coach: Jack Dean (1st season)
- Home stadium: O'Brien Stadium

1972 NCAA College Division independents football records
	Conf.			Overall
Team	W	L	T	W		L		T
No. 4 Ashland		–		11	–	0	–	0
Bridgeport		–		11	–	0	–	0
No. 1 Delaware		–		10	–	0	–	0
No. 5 Tennessee State		–		11	–	1	–	0
Colorado College		–		8	–	1	–	0
Tampa		–		10	–	2	–	0
Trinity (TX)		–		8	–	2	–	0
Western Carolina		–		7	–	2	–	1
Hawaii		–		8	–	3	–	0
Indiana State		–		7	–	3	–	0
Northeastern		–		6	–	2	–	0
Bucknell		–		6	–	3	–	0
Cortland		–		6	–	3	–	0
San Diego		–		6	–	3	–	1
Arkansas–Pine Bluff		–		4	–	2	–	1
Eastern Michigan		–		6	–	4	–	0
Milwaukee		–		6	–	4	–	0
Samford		–		5	–	3	–	2
Ball State		–		5	–	4	–	1
Lake Forest		–		4	–	3	–	1
Nevada		–		6	–	5	–	0
Central Michigan		–		5	–	5	–	1
Rose-Hulman		–		5	–	5	–	0
Santa Clara		–		4	–	4	–	1
Akron		–		3	–	4	–	2
St. Norbert		–		4	–	5	–	0
Saint Mary's		–		3	–	4	–	0
Kentucky State		–		4	–	6	–	0
Drexel		–		3	–	6	–	0
Northeast Louisiana		–		3	–	7	–	0
Portland State		–		3	–	8	–	0
Wayne State (MI)		–		2	–	5	–	1
Boston University		–		2	–	8	–	0
Northern Michigan		–		2	–	8	–	0
Saint Peter's		–		2	–	8	–	0
Chattanooga		–		2	–	9	–	0
Southern Illinois		–		1	–	8	–	1
Eastern Illinois		–		1	–	9	–	0
Madison		–		0	–	4	–	1
UNLV		–		1	–	10	–	0
Rankings from AP small college poll

The 1972 Eastern Illinois Panthers football team represented Eastern Illinois University as an independent during the 1972 NCAA College Division football season. Led by first-year head coach Jack Dean, the Panthers compiled a record of 1–9. They played their home games at O'Brien Stadium in Charleston, Illinois.

== Schedule ==
Date	Time	Opponent	Site	Result	Attendance	Source
September 16		Indiana State	O'Brien Stadium; Charleston, IL	L 14–17	7,500	
September 23		Milwaukee	O'Brien Stadium; Charleston, IL	L 16–17	8,000	
September 30		at Chicago Circle	Soldier Field; Chicago, IL	W 28–13	500	
October 7		Illinois State	O'Brien Stadium; Charleston, IL (rivalry)	L 11–38	8,000	
October 14	7:30 p.m.	at Evansville	Evansville, IN	L 20–31	3,500–4,000	
October 21		Central Michigan	O'Brien Stadium; Charleston, IL	L 0–63	1,000	
October 28		at Southwest Missouri State	Briggs Stadium; Springfield, MO	L 37–41	8,000	
November 4		at Quantico Marines	Quantico, VA	L 14–56	6,000	
November 11		Central Missouri State	O'Brien Stadium; Charleston, IL	L 14–35	2,500	
November 18		at Western Illinois	Hanson Field; Macomb, IL	L 13–42	4,000	
All times are in Central time
