= Delaware–West Chester football rivalry =

American college football rivalry

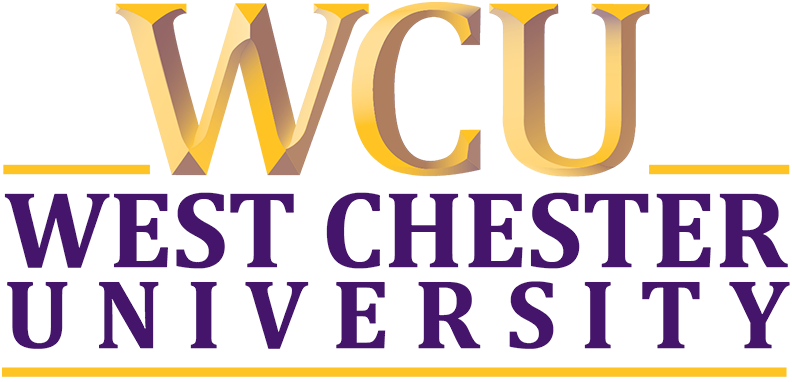
- Delaware Fightin' Blue Hens West Chester Golden Rams
- Sport: Football
- First meeting: September 27, 1941; Tie, 7–7
- Latest meeting: August 30, 2012; Delaware, 41–21
- Next meeting: TBA

Statistics
- Total meetings: 55
- All-time series: Delaware leads 47–6–2
- Current win streak: Delaware, 19 (1993–present)

Locations of Delaware and West Chester

The rivalry between the Delaware Fightin' Blue Hens and the West Chester Golden Rams was a match-up between two similarly sized schools located less than 30 miles (48 km) apart. Presently, West Chester competes in the Pennsylvania State Athletic Conference as a member of Division II, while Delaware competes in Conference USA as a member of Division I FBS. These classifications don’t allow for competition between the schools, but when Delaware was in the FCS level they were allowed to play each other. Prior to 1980, Delaware competed in Division II, placing them on the same level as West Chester. As of 2023, there are no future meetings scheduled in this series.

== Game results ==
| Delaware victories | West Chester victories | Tie games |

| No. | Date | Location | Winner | Score |
|---|---|---|---|---|
| 1 | September 27, 1941 | Newark, DE | Tie | 7–7 |
| 2 | September 25, 1942 | Wilmington, DE | Delaware | 20–0 |
| 3 | October 19, 1945 | West Chester, PA | Tie | 6–6 |
| 4 | October 9, 1948 | Wilmington, DE | Delaware | 19–0 |
| 5 | November 19, 1949 | Wilmington, DE | Delaware | 27–14 |
| 6 | September 30, 1950 | Wilmington, DE | Delaware | 16–13 |
| 7 | October 6, 1951 | Wilmington, DE | Delaware | 47–20 |
| 8 | October 11, 1952 | Wilmington, DE | West Chester | 24–20 |
| 9 | October 10, 1953 | Newark, DE | West Chester | 27–13 |
| 10 | September 25, 1954 | Newark, DE | Delaware | 40–6 |
| 11 | September 22, 1956 | Newark, DE | West Chester | 10–7 |
| 12 | October 19, 1968 | Newark, DE | Delaware | 28–0 |
| 13 | October 18, 1969 | Newark, DE | Delaware | 24–8 |
| 14 | September 12, 1970 | Newark, DE | Delaware | 39–22 |
| 15 | October 23, 1971 | Newark, DE | Delaware | 47–28 |
| 16 | October 21, 1972 | Newark, DE | Delaware | 31–14 |
| 17 | September 15, 1973 | Newark, DE | Delaware | 49–14 |
| 18 | November 16, 1974 | Newark, DE | Delaware | 31–3 |
| 19 | November 15, 1975 | Newark, DE | Delaware | 35–7 |
| 20 | November 13, 1976 | Newark, DE | Delaware | 42–7 |
| 21 | September 17, 1977 | Newark, DE | Delaware | 17–15 |
| 22 | September 16, 1978 | Newark, DE | Delaware | 56–0 |
| 23 | September 15, 1979 | Newark, DE | Delaware | 42–6 |
| 24 | September 13, 1980 | Newark, DE | Delaware | 28–7 |
| 25 | November 21, 1981 | Newark, DE | Delaware | 31–14 |
| 26 | November 13, 1982 | Newark, DE | Delaware | 55–13 |
| 27 | September 10, 1983 | Newark, DE | West Chester | 35–27 |
| 28 | September 22, 1984 | Newark, DE | Delaware | 21–20 |

| No. | Date | Location | Winner | Score |
|---|---|---|---|---|
| 29 | October 5, 1985 | Newark, DE | Delaware | 37–22 |
| 30 | September 20, 1986 | Newark, DE | Delaware | 33–31 |
| 31 | September 19, 1987 | Newark, DE | Delaware | 28–21 |
| 32 | November 12, 1988 | Newark, DE | West Chester | 33–13 |
| 33 | September 23, 1989 | Newark, DE | Delaware | 41–21 |
| 34 | September 22, 1990 | Newark, DE | Delaware | 13–12 |
| 35 | August 31, 1991 | Newark, DE | Delaware | 28–0 |
| 36 | September 26, 1992 | Newark, DE | West Chester | 21–20 |
| 37 | September 25, 1993 | Newark, DE | Delaware | 56–41 |
| 38 | September 24, 1994 | Newark, DE | Delaware | 58–55 |
| 39 | September 9, 1995 | Newark, DE | Delaware | 49–21 |
| 40 | September 21, 1996 | Newark, DE | Delaware | 24–17 |
| 41 | September 20, 1997 | Newark, DE | Delaware | 28–7 |
| 42 | September 19, 1998 | Newark, DE | Delaware | 42–21 |
| 43 | September 18, 1999 | Newark, DE | Delaware | 28–0 |
| 44 | September 23, 2000 | Newark, DE | Delaware | 84–0 |
| 45 | September 21, 2002 | Newark, DE | Delaware | 31–10 |
| 46 | September 20, 2003 | Newark, DE | Delaware | 49–7 |
| 47 | September 18, 2004 | Newark, DE | Delaware | 24–6 |
| 48 | September 17, 2005 | Newark, DE | Delaware | 42–21 |
| 49 | September 9, 2006 | Newark, DE | Delaware | 30–7 |
| 50 | September 8, 2007 | Newark, DE | Delaware | 41–14 |
| 51 | September 13, 2008 | Newark, DE | Delaware | 48–20 |
| 52 | September 4, 2009 | Newark, DE | Delaware | 35–0 |
| 53 | September 2, 2010 | Newark, DE | Delaware | 31–0 |
| 54 | September 10, 2011 | Newark, DE | Delaware | 28–17 |
| 55 | August 30, 2012 | Newark, DE | Delaware | 41–21 |
Series: Delaware leads 47–6–2

A game was scheduled for September 15, 2001, that was cancelled following the September 11 attacks.

== See also ==
- List of NCAA college football rivalry games
