= Delaware–Lehigh football rivalry =

American college football rivalry

- Delaware Fightin' Blue Hens Lehigh Mountain Hawks
- Sport: American football
- First meeting: September 28, 1912; Lehigh, 45–0
- Latest meeting: December 4, 2010; Delaware, 42–20

Statistics
- Total meetings: 47
- All-time series: Delaware leads, 30–17
- Longest win streak: Delaware, 9 (1961–1969)
- Current win streak: Delaware, 3

Locations of Delaware and Lehigh

The Delaware–Lehigh football rivalry was an American college football rivalry between the Fightin' Blue Hens of the University of Delaware and the Mountain Hawks of Lehigh University.

Though the rivalry has been largely dormant since the 1990s, it was contested annually in the 1950s and 1960s, when both universities were members of the Middle Atlantic Conference, and was a marquee small-college fixture in the mid-1970s, when Delaware and Lehigh were two of the top-ranked teams in NCAA Division II.

== Competitive rivalry ==
Delaware and Lehigh are in different conferences today – the Colonial Athletic Association and Patriot League, respectively – but Lehigh was Delaware's most-played opponent of the 20th century, and decades after the rivalry's heyday, fan interest in their matchups remained strong.

For Lehigh, the Delaware game could not match the tradition of The Rivalry, its annual season-ending matchup with Lafayette, but those who experienced the height of the Delaware–Lehigh battle in the 1970s and 1980s looked forward to contests against the larger university.

Our alums at Lehigh talk so much about the Delaware game. We talk Lafayette, but all our alumni want to know about is the Delaware game.

— Kevin Higgins, Lehigh coach

In 2005, former Delaware coach Tubby Raymond said he believes Lehigh cherished its wins over Delaware, a stronger program, more than those against Lafayette. John Whitehead, who coached at Lehigh from 1976 to 1985, agreed with that sentiment in a 1993 interview, as did Lehigh athletic director and former quarterback Joe Sterrett: "Delaware always seemed to have the national respect ... the rankings. As a player, we always thought it was a benchmark game for our program."

"When I came to Lehigh, I expected the Lafayette rivalry," said Engineers head coach Hank Small in 1993. "But I quickly found out that the game on the schedule was the Delaware game."

== History ==
Lehigh dominated the first three matchups between the teams, a one-off meeting in 1912 and a home-and-home series in 1938 and 1939. The two teams did not face each other again until 1950.

=== MAC rivals ===
Delaware and Lehigh, both football independents and members of the Middle Atlantic Conference in other sports, began playing an annual gridiron matchup in 1950. Initially, the Engineers (as Lehigh's teams were then known) were the established powerhouse and the Blue Hens were the upstart looking to prove themselves, a status reflected in Lehigh's 1950 shutout win. The rest of the 1950s was harder fought, reflecting Delaware's growth as a football program, and leading to a nine-year rivalry win streak in the 1960s.

The Blue Hens–Engineers rivalry became a league game in 1958, when the MAC formally organized two football conferences, one of them a "University Division" including Delaware and Lehigh. The MAC University Division continued playing until 1969. During the last nine years of league play, Delaware won every game against Lehigh, the longest win streak between the two teams.

Those losses led to Lehigh adopting the Delaware Wing-T, which had troubled its defenses so much, as its own offensive scheme.

=== D-II independents ===
As Division II independents in the 1970s, Delaware and Lehigh continued to meet annually in the regular season, in a matchup that almost always had playoff implications: Delaware took part in the Division II tournament in 1973, 1974, 1975, 1978 and 1979, winning the championship in 1979, while Lehigh earned Division II playoff berths in 1973 and 1975.

It was during this era that the rivalry really heated up, recalled The Morning Call sports columnist Terry Larimer in 2000. The late 1970s and early 1980s saw a series of hard-fought games with one-score margins.

Both teams later moved up to the NCAA Division I Football Championship Subdivision, originally known as Division I-AA: Lehigh in 1978 and Delaware in 1980. During this era, the matchup continued on their independent schedules, again pitting national powerhouse teams against each other, as Lehigh qualified for the postseason in 1979 and 1980, and Delaware participated in the Division I-AA playoffs in 1981 and 1982.

In 15 seasons from 1968 to 1982, the Lambert Cup, recognizing the top small-college football program in the Northeast, was awarded to either Delaware or Lehigh every year except two. Delaware won the cup 10 times, and Lehigh won it four times, including a Delaware-Lehigh tie in 1973.

For Lehigh players, the Delaware game was the one that mattered most, recalled late 1970s Engineers linebacker John Shigo. Not only was Delaware one of the toughest opponents on the schedule, but because the schools recruited in the same territory, many Lehigh players had been turned down by Delaware as too slow or too small – giving them extra motivation to beat the Blue Hens.

Mike Schoenwolf, a quarterback and punter for the late 1970s Blue Hens, said his teams had a similar motivation: "The big thing at that time was, you don't lose to anybody in your backyard," he said. "And Lehigh was in our backyard. Back in those years, it was a game we had to win. There was no question about it."

=== Different leagues ===
Regular-season matchups became rarer after 1986, when Delaware joined the Yankee Conference (later renamed Atlantic-10 and currently Colonial Athletic Association), and Lehigh joined the unrelated Colonial League (now called Patriot League).

Delaware, playing in a league with other state universities, continued to compete at a high level in Division I-AA, making the playoffs several times in the late 1980s and the 1990s. Lehigh's new conference, on the other hand, barred its members from offering athletic scholarships or participating in the postseason. As the Colonial League had modeled its bylaws on the Ivy League, Lehigh's non-conference schedule largely consisted of Ivy teams. Their last matchup of the 1980s was played in 1987.

After a five-year hiatus, the longest break in the series since 1950, Delaware and Lehigh played five games in the 1990s. As of 2020, the former league rivals have met during the regular season only once in the 21st century, a Delaware win in 2005. They have met twice in the FCS national playoffs, however, both Delaware wins.

== Game results ==
Delaware home games were at Joe Frazer Field in Newark, Delaware (1938), Wilmington Park in Wilmington, Delaware (1951), and Delaware Stadium in Newark (since 1952).

Lehigh home games were at Taylor Stadium in Bethlehem, Pennsylvania, until 1987, and at Goodman Stadium in Bethlehem since 1988.

Delaware victories	Lehigh victories	Tie games

No.	Date	Location	Winner	Score
1	September 28, 1912	Bethlehem	Lehigh	45–0
2	October 22, 1938	Newark	Lehigh	33–0
3	November 18, 1939	Bethlehem	Lehigh	39–7
4	September 23, 1950	Bethlehem	Lehigh	21–0
5	September 22, 1951	Wilmington	Delaware	7–0
6	October 4, 1952	Bethlehem	Delaware	7–6
7	October 3, 1953	Newark	Delaware	26–13
8	October 2, 1954	Bethlehem	Delaware	21–0
9	October 1, 1955	Newark	Lehigh	19–13
10	September 29, 1956	Bethlehem	Delaware	33–7
11	September 28, 1957	Newark	Lehigh	19–14
12	September 27, 1958	Bethlehem	Lehigh	8–7
13	September 26, 1959	Newark	Delaware	12–7
14	September 24, 1960	Bethlehem	Lehigh	27–14
15	September 23, 1961	Newark	Delaware	14–6
16	September 22, 1962	Bethlehem	Delaware	27–0
17	September 28, 1963	Newark	Delaware	30–0
18	October 24, 1964	Bethlehem	Delaware	46–8
19	October 23, 1965	Bethlehem	Delaware	42–21
20	October 22, 1966	Newark	Delaware	41–0
21	November 11, 1967	Newark	Delaware	33–10
22	November 9, 1968	Bethlehem	Delaware	27–13
23	November 8, 1969	Newark	Delaware	42–14
24	November 7, 1970	Bethlehem	Lehigh	36–13
25	November 6, 1971	Newark	Delaware	49–22

No.	Date	Location	Winner	Score
26	September 16, 1972	Newark	Delaware	28–22
27	September 29, 1973	Bethlehem	Delaware	21–9
28	October 19, 1974	Bethlehem	Delaware	14–7
29	October 18, 1975	Newark	Lehigh	35–23
30	October 7, 1978	Bethlehem	Lehigh	27–17
31	October 6, 1979	Newark	Delaware	21–14
32	October 4, 1980	Bethlehem	Lehigh	27–20
33	October 3, 1981	Newark	Lehigh	24–21
34	October 2, 1982	Bethlehem	Delaware	20–19
35	October 1, 1983	Newark	Lehigh	24–19
36	September 29, 1984	Bethlehem	Lehigh	46–6
37	October 26, 1985	Newark	Lehigh	16–14
38	October 25, 1986	Newark	Delaware	28–17
39	October 24, 1987	Bethlehem	Delaware	28–24
40	September 4, 1993	Newark	Delaware	62–21
41	November 5, 1994	Bethlehem	Delaware	45–29
42	September 7, 1996	Newark	Delaware	49–7
43	November 15, 1997	Bethlehem	Delaware	24–19
44	October 16, 1999	Newark	Lehigh	42–35
45	December 2, 2000†	Newark	Delaware	47–22
46	September 10, 2005	Newark	Delaware	34–33
47	December 4, 2010†	Newark	Delaware	42–20
Series: Delaware leads 30–17
† NCAA Division I FCS playoffs

== See also ==
- List of NCAA college football rivalry games
