= Western Maryland =

Region in Maryland, US

Coordinates: 39°41′40.23″N 77°52′15.94″W

- Interactive map of Western Maryland
- Country: United States
- State: Maryland
- Largest city: Hagerstown
- Counties: List: Allegany; Garrett; Washington
- Elevation: 3,360 ft (1,020 m)

Population (2020 Census)
  - Total: 252,614
- Time zone: UTC−5 (EST)
  - Summer (DST): UTC−4 (EDT)

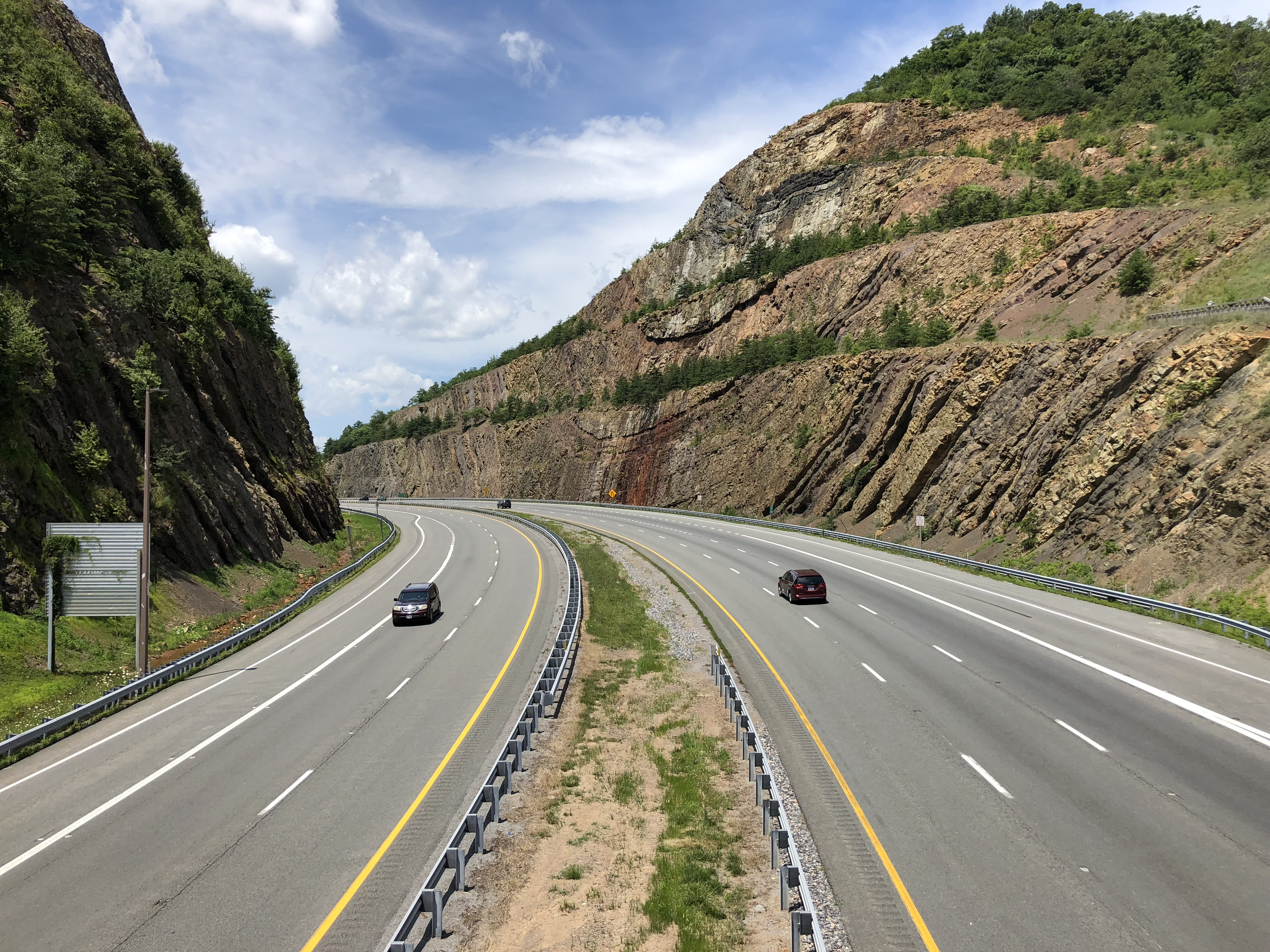
Sideling Hill Road Cut, a man-made mountain pass on Interstate 68/U.S. Route 40 near Hancock, Maryland

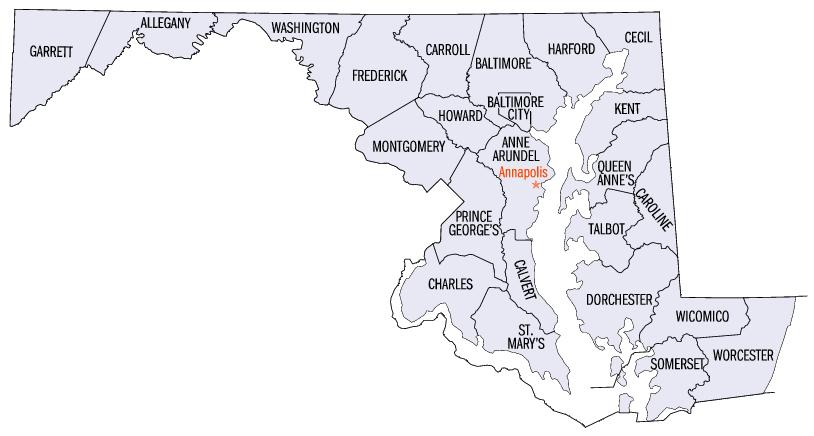
An enlargeable map of Maryland's 23 counties and one independent city

Western Maryland, also known as the Maryland panhandle or Mountain Maryland, is the portion of the U.S. state of Maryland that typically consists of Washington, Allegany, and Garrett counties. The region is bounded by the Mason-Dixon line (Pennsylvania) to the north, the Potomac River and West Virginia to the south, and Preston County, West Virginia to the west. At one point, at the town of Hancock, the northern and southern boundaries are separated by just 1.8 miles (2.9 km), the narrowest stretch in the state.

Western Maryland is more rural than the Washington-Baltimore area, where most of the state's population lives, and is noted for its mountainous terrain. The area is in the central Appalachians. Washington, Allegany, and Garrett counties are part of the Appalachian Regional Commission. The most populous community in Western Maryland is Hagerstown, located in Washington County, the most populous county in the region. Major highways in Western Maryland include Interstate Highways I-70, I-81 and I-68; U.S. Highways U.S. 11, U.S. 40, U.S. 40 ALT, U.S. 219 and U.S. 50; and several state highways.

== Climate ==
The climate of Western Maryland is more akin to the mountains of northern West Virginia than to any other part of Maryland. Summers tend to be much cooler than in the rest of the state, and winters harsher. Temperatures in winter can drop to below 0 °F (−17.8 °C) on around eight nights per winter, and snowfall averages from 20 inches (0.51 m) farther east to over 120 inches (3.05 m) in the higher elevations. In comparison, Prince George's County, in the eastern part of the Washington metropolitan area, would previously average only 25 inches (0.64 m) of snow and wintertime maxima exceeded 50 °F (10 °C) on a third of all days.

The regional climate is classified as humid continental (Dfa/Dfb) except in some lower-elevation areas of Washington County which have a humid subtropical climate (Cfa). Below is climate data for Hagerstown, the largest city in Western Maryland, located in Washington County, the easternmost and lowest elevation county in Western Maryland.

Climate data for Hagerstown, Maryland (Hagerstown Regional Airport), 1991–2020 normals, extremes 1899–present
Month	Jan	Feb	Mar	Apr	May	Jun	Jul	Aug	Sep	Oct	Nov	Dec	Year
Record high °F (°C)	78 (26)	82 (28)	88 (31)	94 (34)	96 (36)	102 (39)	107 (42)	104 (40)	101 (38)	95 (35)	83 (28)	75 (24)	107 (42)
Mean maximum °F (°C)	62.5 (16.9)	64.2 (17.9)	74.9 (23.8)	84.3 (29.1)	90.0 (32.2)	93.8 (34.3)	96.1 (35.6)	94.3 (34.6)	90.0 (32.2)	82.4 (28.0)	72.0 (22.2)	62.6 (17.0)	97.0 (36.1)
Mean daily maximum °F (°C)	40.5 (4.7)	43.6 (6.4)	52.8 (11.6)	64.9 (18.3)	74.4 (23.6)	82.6 (28.1)	87.3 (30.7)	84.9 (29.4)	77.8 (25.4)	66.0 (18.9)	54.4 (12.4)	44.0 (6.7)	64.4 (18.0)
Daily mean °F (°C)	32.9 (0.5)	35.5 (1.9)	43.4 (6.3)	54.6 (12.6)	64.4 (18.0)	73.1 (22.8)	77.6 (25.3)	75.3 (24.1)	68.4 (20.2)	56.7 (13.7)	45.9 (7.7)	36.9 (2.7)	55.4 (13.0)
Mean daily minimum °F (°C)	25.3 (−3.7)	27.3 (−2.6)	34.0 (1.1)	44.3 (6.8)	54.5 (12.5)	63.7 (17.6)	67.9 (19.9)	65.7 (18.7)	58.9 (14.9)	47.4 (8.6)	37.4 (3.0)	29.8 (−1.2)	46.3 (7.9)
Mean minimum °F (°C)	6.7 (−14.1)	10.0 (−12.2)	16.4 (−8.7)	28.4 (−2.0)	38.4 (3.6)	49.2 (9.6)	56.1 (13.4)	54.1 (12.3)	43.6 (6.4)	32.0 (0.0)	22.3 (−5.4)	13.8 (−10.1)	4.4 (−15.3)
Record low °F (°C)	−27 (−33)	−20 (−29)	−7 (−22)	9 (−13)	23 (−5)	30 (−1)	42 (6)	39 (4)	25 (−4)	18 (−8)	−4 (−20)	−13 (−25)	−27 (−33)
Average precipitation inches (mm)	2.46 (62)	1.97 (50)	3.04 (77)	3.33 (85)	3.55 (90)	3.36 (85)	2.94 (75)	2.90 (74)	3.83 (97)	2.76 (70)	2.63 (67)	2.83 (72)	35.60 (904)
Average precipitation days (≥ 0.01 in)	10.0	8.9	10.3	11.7	14.0	11.8	11.4	10.0	9.5	9.2	8.4	9.2	124.4
Source: NOAA

Below is climate data for Oakland, located in Garrett County, the westernmost and highest elevation county in Western Maryland.

Climate data for Oakland, Maryland (1991−2020 normals, extremes 1893−present)
Month	Jan	Feb	Mar	Apr	May	Jun	Jul	Aug	Sep	Oct	Nov	Dec	Year
Record high °F (°C)	75 (24)	76 (24)	83 (28)	88 (31)	89 (32)	95 (35)	98 (37)	101 (38)	95 (35)	88 (31)	78 (26)	74 (23)	101 (38)
Mean maximum °F (°C)	61.0 (16.1)	61.9 (16.6)	70.5 (21.4)	79.4 (26.3)	83.7 (28.7)	86.1 (30.1)	88.3 (31.3)	86.7 (30.4)	84.5 (29.2)	78.1 (25.6)	71.2 (21.8)	62.7 (17.1)	88.8 (31.6)
Mean daily maximum °F (°C)	36.7 (2.6)	40.3 (4.6)	48.9 (9.4)	61.3 (16.3)	70.0 (21.1)	77.0 (25.0)	81.0 (27.2)	79.6 (26.4)	73.8 (23.2)	63.4 (17.4)	51.5 (10.8)	41.5 (5.3)	60.4 (15.8)
Daily mean °F (°C)	27.5 (−2.5)	30.0 (−1.1)	37.8 (3.2)	49.0 (9.4)	58.9 (14.9)	66.5 (19.2)	70.7 (21.5)	69.0 (20.6)	62.4 (16.9)	51.4 (10.8)	40.6 (4.8)	32.7 (0.4)	49.7 (9.8)
Mean daily minimum °F (°C)	18.3 (−7.6)	19.8 (−6.8)	26.6 (−3.0)	36.7 (2.6)	47.7 (8.7)	56.1 (13.4)	60.4 (15.8)	58.3 (14.6)	51.0 (10.6)	39.5 (4.2)	29.7 (−1.3)	23.8 (−4.6)	39.0 (3.9)
Mean minimum °F (°C)	−6.5 (−21.4)	−3.1 (−19.5)	5.8 (−14.6)	20.7 (−6.3)	30.0 (−1.1)	39.6 (4.2)	46.4 (8.0)	45.2 (7.3)	35.0 (1.7)	24.0 (−4.4)	12.6 (−10.8)	3.7 (−15.7)	−9.4 (−23.0)
Record low °F (°C)	−40 (−40)	−29 (−34)	−20 (−29)	−2 (−19)	17 (−8)	26 (−3)	33 (1)	30 (−1)	19 (−7)	7 (−14)	−16 (−27)	−32 (−36)	−40 (−40)
Average precipitation inches (mm)	3.90 (99)	3.56 (90)	4.32 (110)	4.33 (110)	5.34 (136)	4.91 (125)	5.14 (131)	4.33 (110)	3.69 (94)	3.61 (92)	3.38 (86)	4.29 (109)	50.80 (1,290)
Average snowfall inches (cm)	30.2 (77)	22.0 (56)	19.6 (50)	3.7 (9.4)	0.0 (0.0)	0.0 (0.0)	0.0 (0.0)	0.0 (0.0)	0.0 (0.0)	1.6 (4.1)	6.4 (16)	21.4 (54)	104.9 (266)
Average extreme snow depth inches (cm)	13.2 (34)	9.4 (24)	5.0 (13)	1.0 (2.5)	0.0 (0.0)	0.0 (0.0)	0.0 (0.0)	0.0 (0.0)	0.0 (0.0)	1.0 (2.5)	1.9 (4.8)	8.3 (21)	17.8 (45)
Average precipitation days (≥ 0.01 in)	17.4	14.1	14.8	15.1	16.1	14.7	13.4	12.3	11.7	12.7	12.4	16.0	170.7
Average snowy days (≥ 0.1 in)	11.3	8.3	6.4	1.9	0.0	0.0	0.0	0.0	0.0	0.5	2.9	7.8	39.1
Source: NOAA

Below is climate data for Cumberland, the seat of Allegany County:

Climate data for Cumberland 2, Maryland (1991−2020 normals, extremes 1974−present)
Month	Jan	Feb	Mar	Apr	May	Jun	Jul	Aug	Sep	Oct	Nov	Dec	Year
Record high °F (°C)	75 (24)	83 (28)	90 (32)	96 (36)	98 (37)	103 (39)	105 (41)	105 (41)	102 (39)	94 (34)	87 (31)	80 (27)	105 (41)
Mean daily maximum °F (°C)	39.2 (4.0)	43.4 (6.3)	53.0 (11.7)	66.3 (19.1)	74.6 (23.7)	82.5 (28.1)	87.1 (30.6)	85.4 (29.7)	78.5 (25.8)	66.8 (19.3)	53.9 (12.2)	42.9 (6.1)	64.5 (18.1)
Daily mean °F (°C)	30.8 (−0.7)	33.7 (0.9)	42.1 (5.6)	53.6 (12.0)	62.9 (17.2)	71.3 (21.8)	75.8 (24.3)	74.0 (23.3)	66.8 (19.3)	55.0 (12.8)	43.7 (6.5)	35.0 (1.7)	53.7 (12.1)
Mean daily minimum °F (°C)	22.5 (−5.3)	23.9 (−4.5)	31.2 (−0.4)	40.9 (4.9)	51.2 (10.7)	60.1 (15.6)	64.4 (18.0)	62.7 (17.1)	55.0 (12.8)	43.2 (6.2)	33.5 (0.8)	27.1 (−2.7)	43.0 (6.1)
Record low °F (°C)	−14 (−26)	−3 (−19)	3 (−16)	20 (−7)	25 (−4)	39 (4)	46 (8)	38 (3)	31 (−1)	20 (−7)	10 (−12)	−8 (−22)	−14 (−26)
Average precipitation inches (mm)	2.79 (71)	2.38 (60)	3.42 (87)	3.41 (87)	4.22 (107)	3.87 (98)	3.73 (95)	3.40 (86)	3.55 (90)	2.82 (72)	2.58 (66)	3.05 (77)	39.22 (996)
Average snowfall inches (cm)	8.2 (21)	7.7 (20)	6.8 (17)	0.1 (0.25)	0.0 (0.0)	0.0 (0.0)	0.0 (0.0)	0.0 (0.0)	0.0 (0.0)	0.0 (0.0)	0.5 (1.3)	5.4 (14)	28.7 (73)
Average precipitation days (≥ 0.01 in)	12.6	10.9	12.1	12.6	14.4	12.4	10.9	10.7	10.0	9.4	9.1	11.3	136.4
Average snowy days (≥ 0.1 in)	3.5	3.4	2.1	0.1	0.0	0.0	0.0	0.0	0.0	0.0	0.3	2.1	11.5
Source: NOAA

According to the Köppen climate classification Hagerstown is Cfa, Oakland is Dfb, and Cumberland is Dfa.

== History ==
In 1748, the Western Maryland population was finally large enough to create a new county called Frederick County; at the time, the county stretched further west than it does today. In the earliest part of the colonial days, German immigrants that came from Pennsylvania had the most influence on the development of the plains and valleys of Western Maryland.

Named for George Washington, Washington County was founded in 1776, by division of Frederick County. The largest city in this county is Hagerstown. It was named after Jonathan Hager, a German settler.

In 1785, the city of Cumberland, which is in Allegany County, was established. The County was the home for many pioneers, when they would travel through the Cumberland Narrows, a 1,000 foot high gap. This gap forms the main pass through the Allegheny Mountains to the west. In the mid-18th century, English settlers came to the county and began to mine and create towns and farms. This county was important for transportation for many travelers heading west. They would pass through by many forms of transportation, including canal, train, and horse and buggy.

The westernmost county in the state, Garrett County, was the last part of Maryland to be settled in 1764. The county was founded in 1872 by John Work Garrett, the B&O Railroad president.

=== Appalachian development ===
The Appalachian Regional Development Act was created and passed in 1965 in an effort to correct the poverty issue, and the growing economic problems in the Appalachian region (13 States). According to the State of Maryland Appalachian Development Plan, the Act was passed because: (1) One in every three Appalachians lived in poverty; (2) Per capita income was 23% less than the US average; and (3) High unemployment and harsh living conditions had, in the 1950s, forced more than 2 million Appalachian people to leave their homes and seek work in other regions.

For the state of Maryland, this act was intended to bring awareness to the poverty levels of the Western Maryland counties. The program that was developed for this act was called the Appalachian Regional Commission (ARC). The main goal of the ARC was to improve the development of the economy, and bring this region into socioeconomic parity with the rest of the nation.

=== Annexation attempts by West Virginia ===
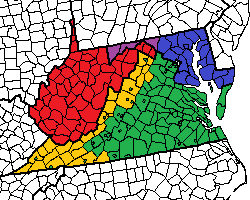
In 2021 Maryland (blue) legislators proposed that three counties (purple) be annexed to West Virginia (red). In 2025 West Virginia legislators again called for the purple counties to be annexed, along with 30 counties (yellow) from Virginia (green).

In 2021 a delegation of Maryland Republican legislators George Edwards, Mike McKay and Wendell Beitzel traveled to Charleston, West Virginia, to petition the state of West Virginia to annex Western Maryland's counties via a referendum. Although they only named Garrett and Allegany counties by name, McKay also represents Washington County. A letter dated to October 14 called for Allegany and Garrett counties become "constituent counties of West Virginia" and was sent to West Virginia Speaker of the House Roger Hanshaw and Senate President Craig Blair. West Virginia's President pro tempore Gary Howell stated "Our legislature is extremely honored that these three counties want to join our state, we take the request extremely seriously. They reached out to us. We have informed our governor and he is very receptive. I look at it like this, if Annapolis has nothing to fear, they will let the people in those three counties have their vote. We think they fit in very well with West Virginia."

Howell then suggested a meeting between top state officials from the two states to meet at the Greater Cumberland Regional Airport to discuss the details further, suggesting that West Virginia would be willing to pay $1.5 billion for the counties. Jake Shade, who was running against McKay in the primaries, criticized the proposal due to the effects of the Covid-19 pandemic. West Virginia Governor Jim Justice endorsed the proposal on October 25, however, by then Edwards had retracted his support for annexation, and Maryland Governor Larry Hogan denounced the effort as "a mistake" and "just a game for attention" as the effort largely petered out due to lack of any sign of support in Annapolis.

In November 2025 West Virginia state senator Chris Rose again proposed annexing Maryland's panhandle as part of the Appeal to Heaven movement alongside 30 counties from Western Virginia shortly after the election of Abigail Spanberger as Virginia's governor.

== County population ==
According to the 2020 United States census, the three westernmost counties of Maryland have a population of 251,617, accounting for 4.1% of the population of Maryland.

The most populated county is Washington County, which is home to approximately 154,705 people. Allegany County is the next most populated county with 68,106 people, while Garrett County is the least populated with 28,806 people.

Populations of counties and statistical areas encompassing Western Maryland
Core Based Statistical Area	2020 Census	County	2020 Census	2010 Census	Change
Hagerstown-Martinsburg, MD-WV MSA	293,844	Washington County, Maryland	154,705	147,430	+4.9%
Hagerstown-Martinsburg, MD-WV MSA	293,844	Berkeley County, West Virginia	122,076	104,169	+17.2%
Hagerstown-Martinsburg, MD-WV MSA	293,844	Morgan County, West Virginia	17,063	17,541	-2.7%
Cumberland, MD-WV MSA	95,044	Allegany County, Maryland	68,106	75,087	-9.3%
Cumberland, MD-WV MSA	95,044	Mineral County, West Virginia	26,938	28,212	-4.5%
none		Garrett County, Maryland	28,806	30,097	-4.3%

== Major communities ==
The following are some of the major cities in Western Maryland by county, in descending order of population, along with the city population of the 2020 census.

Washington County:

- Hagerstown (43,527)
- Boonsboro (3,336)
- Smithsburg (2,975)
- Williamsport (2,137)
- Hancock (1,546)

Allegany County:

- Cumberland (20,859)
- Frostburg (9,002)
- Westernport (1,888)

Garrett County:

- Mountain Lake Park (2,092)
- Oakland (1,925)

== Economy ==
Western Maryland has a heavily agricultural economy. Its best-known crops are the apples grown in the Cumberland Valley, but corn, potatoes, beans, and varieties of green-leaf vegetables are grown as well. Mixed crop and livestock farms are common, and the region has a large number of dairy cattle farms.

== Tourism ==
Tourism is very important to Western Maryland. There is a thriving tourist industry, and has been noted as having "potential for significant growth."

Western Maryland has a number of sites with significance for military history, particularly the Civil War. In 1862, Washington County was home to one of the Civil War's bloodiest single-day battles at Antietam National Battlefield.

Western Maryland, particularly Cumberland, is also home to transportation themed tourism. The Downtown Cumberland Historic District is a National Register Historic District, and Cumberland's Western Maryland Railway Station is a popular site.

Garrett County is also well known for its numerous state parks and outdoor activities. Places such as Deep Creek Lake in Garrett County are frequented by many visitors every year. The largest lake in Western Maryland is Deep Creek Lake in Garrett County. The 4,000 acre body of water is owned by the State of Maryland and is man made. Construction began in 1920 and the lake was filled by 1929. It was originally made to power a small scale hydroelectric plant, but was eventually turned into a tourist destination. The lake is currently managed for boating and fishing, although it still provides some water to generate electricity. The Deep Creek Lake State Park offers fishing piers, beach and swim area, covered pavilions, and opportunities for camping.

Maryland's only ski resort, Wisp Ski Resort, is located on a 172 acre property next to Deep Creek Lake. Hosting a year-round mountain coaster and cross country skiing and snowmobiling in the winter, it is a major tourist attraction in the region.

== Sports ==
Sports teams in Western Maryland include the following:

Team name	Sport	Competition	Stadium/Field
Frostburg State Bobcats	(multiple)	NCAA Division II (Mountain East)	

Garrett County along the Savage River has played host to two ICF Canoe Slalom World Championships in 1989 and 2014.

== Education ==
Colleges in Western Maryland include:

- Allegany College of Maryland – community college
- Frostburg State University
- Garrett College – community college
- Hagerstown Community College – community college

== Potential state ==
In 2014, it was reported that some residents want the region to form a new state, which would include Garrett, Allegany, Washington, Frederick, and Carroll counties. Local supporters of partitioning western Maryland (dubbed "the Western Maryland Initiative") cited a perception of political domination by the more populous eastern portion of the state, particularly with reference to such issues as gun control, taxation, and same-sex marriage.

== See also ==
- List of Appalachian Regional Commission counties
