= List of Drexel Dragons football seasons =

The Drexel Dragons college football team played until 1973, representing Drexel University.

== Seasons ==
National champions †	Conference champions *	Division champions ‡	Bowl game berth ^

Season	Head coach	Conference	Season results					Bowl result	Final ranking	
Season	Head coach	Conference	Conference finish	Division finish	Wins	Losses	Ties	Bowl result	Associated Press Poll	Coaches' Poll
Drexel Dragons
1892	No coach	Independent	—	—	0	1	0	—	N/A	N/A
1893	No coach	Independent	—	—	3	2	0	—	N/A	N/A
1894	No coach	Independent	—	—	1	3	0	—	N/A	N/A
1895	No coach	Independent	—	—	3	3	1	—	N/A	N/A
1896	No coach	Independent	—	—	1	5	0	—	N/A	N/A
1897	No coach	Independent	—	—	6	2	1	—	N/A	N/A
1898	David Leroy Reeves	Independent	—	—	7	0	0	—	N/A	N/A
1899	David Leroy Reeves	Independent	—	—	3	3	0	—	N/A	N/A
1900	No coach	Independent	—	—	5	2	0	—	N/A	N/A
1901	No coach	Independent	—	—	2	5	1	—	N/A	N/A
1902	No coach	Independent	—	—	1	4	1	—	N/A	N/A
1903	No coach	Independent	—	—	?	?	?	—	N/A	N/A
1904	No coach	Independent	—	—	?	?	?	—	N/A	N/A
1905	No coach	Independent	—	—	1	7	0	—	N/A	N/A
1906	No coach	Independent	—	—	6	2	0	—	N/A	N/A
1907	No coach	Independent	—	—	3	2	2	—	N/A	N/A
1908	No coach	Independent	—	—	0	7	0	—	N/A	N/A
1909	Corson	Independent	—	—	1	2	2	—	N/A	N/A
1910	No team	—	—	—	—	—	—	—	N/A	N/A
1911	No team	—	—	—	—	—	—	—	N/A	N/A
1912	No team	—	—	—	—	—	—	—	N/A	N/A
1913	No team	—	—	—	—	—	—	—	N/A	N/A
1914	No team	—	—	—	—	—	—	—	N/A	N/A
1915	No team	—	—	—	—	—	—	—	N/A	N/A
1916	No team	—	—	—	—	—	—	—	N/A	N/A
1917	No team	—	—	—	—	—	—	—	N/A	N/A
1918	No coach	Independent	—	—	0	1	0	—	N/A	N/A
1919	W. L. Ridpath	Independent	—	—	0	4	0	—	N/A	N/A
1920	William McAvoy	Independent	—	—	0	6	0	—	N/A	N/A
1921	William McAvoy	Independent	—	—	2	3	1	—	N/A	N/A
1922	Harry J. O'Brien	Independent	—	—	2	4	0	—	N/A	N/A
1923	Harry J. O'Brien	Independent	—	—	2	6	0	—	N/A	N/A
1924	Harry J. O'Brien	Independent	—	—	2	7	0	—	N/A	N/A
1925	Harry J. O'Brien	Independent	—	—	1	7	0	—	N/A	N/A
1926	Ollie Reed	Independent	—	—	2	5	0	—	N/A	N/A
1927	Walter Halas	Independent	—	—	3	5	1	—	N/A	N/A
1928	Walter Halas	Independent	—	—	8	2	0	—	N/A	N/A
1929	Walter Halas	Independent	—	—	6	3	1	—	N/A	N/A
1930	Walter Halas	Independent	—	—	6	3	1	—	N/A	N/A
1931	Walter Halas	Independent	—	—	7	1	0	—	N/A	N/A
1932	Walter Halas	Independent	—	—	5	1	1	—	N/A	N/A
1933	Walter Halas	Independent	—	—	5	3	0	—	N/A	N/A
1934	Walter Halas	Independent	—	—	4	3	1	—	N/A	N/A
1935	Walter Halas	Independent	—	—	3	2	2	—	N/A	N/A
1936	Walter Halas	Independent	—	—	6	3	0	—	—	N/A
1937 *	Walter Halas	Eastern Pennsylvania Conference	1st *	—	6	2	0	—	—	N/A
1938	Walter Halas	Eastern Pennsylvania Conference	4th	—	4	3	1	—	—	N/A
1939	Walter Halas	Eastern Pennsylvania Conference	4th	—	3	5	1	—	—	N/A
1940	Walter Halas	Eastern Pennsylvania Conference	4th	—	2	6	0	—	—	N/A
1941	Walter Halas	Independent	—	—	4	2	1	—	—	N/A
1942	Albert H. Repscha	Independent	—	—	2	6	0	—	—	N/A
1943	No team	—	—	—	—	—	—	—	—	N/A
1944	Maury McMains	Independent	—	—	2	2	0	—	—	N/A
1945	Maury McMains	Independent	—	—	2	5	0	—	—	N/A
1946	Ralph Chase	Independent	—	—	3	4	0	—	—	N/A
1947	Ralph Chase	Independent	—	—	0	8	0	—	—	N/A
1948	Ralph Chase, Maury McMains	Independent	—	—	0	8	0	—	—	N/A
1949	Otis Douglas	Independent	—	—	3	3	1	—	—	N/A
1950	Eddie Allen	Independent	—	—	6	1	0	—	—	—
1951	Eddie Allen	Independent	—	—	3	4	0	—	—	—
1952	Eddie Allen	Independent	—	—	3	4	0	—	—	—
1953	Eddie Allen	Independent	—	—	2	3	1	—	—	—
1954	Eddie Allen	Independent	—	—	5	2	0	—	—	—
1955	Eddie Allen	Independent	—	—	8	0	0	—	—	—
1956	Eddie Allen	Independent	—	—	5	3	0	—	—	—
1957	Eddie Allen	Independent	—	—	1	7	0	—	—	—
1958	Jack Hinkle	Middle Atlantic Conference	—	6th	1	7	0	—	—	—
1959	Jack Hinkle	Middle Atlantic Conference	—	T–6th	1	6	0	—	—	—
1960	Jack Hinkle	Middle Atlantic Conference	—	7th	0	7	1	—	—	—
1961	Tom Grebis	Middle Atlantic Conference	—	8th	2	5	1	—	—	—
1962 ‡	Tom Grebis	Middle Atlantic Conference	—	T–1st ‡	6	2	0	—	—	—
1963	Tom Grebis	Middle Atlantic Conference	—	5th	5	3	0	—	—	—
1964	Tom Grebis	Middle Atlantic Conference	—	2nd	7	2	0	—	—	—
1965	Tom Grebis	Middle Atlantic Conference	—	3rd	6	2	0	—	—	—
1966	Tom Grebis	Middle Atlantic Conference	—	2nd	6	1	1	—	—	—
1967	Tom Grebis	Middle Atlantic Conference	—	11th	3	5	0	—	—	—
1968	Tom Grebis	Middle Atlantic Conference	—	Ineligible	4	4	0	—	—	—
1969	Sterling Brown	Middle Atlantic Conference	—	7th	3	5	0	—	—	—
1970	Sterling Brown	Independent	—	—	4	4	0	—	—	—
1971	Sterling Brown	Independent	—	—	2	6	0	—	—	—
1972	Sterling Brown	Independent	—	—	3	6	0	—	—	—
1973	Sterling Brown	Independent	—	—	4	4	0	—	—	—
Total					?	?	?	(regular season games)		
Total					0	0	0	(Conference Championship Games; 0 appearances)		
Total					0	0	0	(bowl games; 0 appearances)		
Total					?	?	?	(all games)		
