= 1935 Drexel Dragons football team =

American college football season

1935 Drexel Dragons football
- Conference: Eastern Pennsylvania Collegiate Conference
- Record: 3–2–2 (0–1 Eastern Pennsylvania)
- Head coach: Walter Halas (9th season)
- Captain: Arthur Hoff
- Home stadium: Drexel Field

1935 Eastern Pennsylvania Collegiate Conference football standings
	Conf.					Overall
Team	W		L		T	W		L		T
Franklin & Marshall $	4	–	0	–	0	7	–	2	–	1
Ursinus	3	–	1	–	0	3	–	6	–	0
Dickinson	2	–	1	–	0	6	–	3	–	0
Gettysburg	1	–	3	–	0	3	–	4	–	1
Drexel	0	–	1	–	0	3	–	2	–	2
Muhlenberg	0	–	4	–	0	1	–	9	–	0
$ – Conference champion

1935 Drexel Dragons football team represented Drexel Institute of Technology—now known as Drexel University as a member of the Eastern Pennsylvania Collegiate Conference during the 1935 college football season. Led by ninth-year head coach Walter Halas, the Dragons compiled an overall record of 3–2–2 with a mark of 0–1 in conference play, tying for fifth place at the bottom of the Eastern Pennsylvania Collegiate Conference standings.

== Schedule ==
Date	Time	Opponent	Site	Result	Attendance	Source
October 5		Saint Joseph's*	Drexel Field; Philadelphia, PA	T 7–7		
October 12		at Juniata*	Huntingdon, PA	T 6–6		
October 19		at Lebanon Valley*	Annville, PA	W 12–0		
October 26		CCNY*	Drexel Field; Philadelphia, PA	L 0–14	3,000	
November 2	2:00 pm	Ursinus^{†}	Drexel Field; Philadelphia, PA	L 6–20	3,500	
November 9		Susquehanna*	Drexel Field; Philadelphia, PA	W 16–7		
November 16		Delaware*	Drexel Field; Philadelphia, PA	W 34–7	3,000	
*Non-conference game; ^{†}Homecoming; All times are in Eastern time

== Roster ==
1935 Drexel Dragons football team roster
Players
Coaches
Offense

Pos.	#	Name	Class
FB	32	George Baker
HB	5	Harry Fox	Jr
QB	48	Charlie Knapp	Sr
HB	41	Sam Potter	Sr
TE	31	George Stevens	Jr
OT	27	Albert Fitzgerald	Jr
G	21	George Smullen
C	19	Joseph Rhile	Jr
G	7	Charles Foltz	Sr
OT	22	William C Schaffer
TE	1	Arthur Hoff (C)	Sr

Defense

Pos.	#	Name	Class

Special teams

Pos.	#	Name	Class

Head coach

- Walter Halas (Illinois)

Coordinators/assistant coaches

- Maury McMains (McDaniel)
- Albert H. Repscha (Maine)

Legend

- (C) Team captain
- (S) Suspended
- (I) Ineligible
- Injured
- Redshirt
