= 1940 Drexel Dragons football team =

American college football season

1940 Drexel Dragons football
- Conference: Eastern Pennsylvania Collegiate Conference
- Record: 2–6 (1–1 Eastern Pennsylvania)
- Head coach: Walter Halas (14th season)
- Captain: Walt Hutton

1940 Eastern Pennsylvania Collegiate Conference football standings
	Conf.					Overall
Team	W		L		T	W		L		T
Franklin & Marshall $	3	–	0	–	0	7	–	2	–	0
Muhlenberg	2	–	1	–	0	4	–	6	–	0
Gettysburg	2	–	2	–	0	4	–	4	–	0
Drexel	1	–	1	–	0	2	–	6	–	0
Ursinus	0	–	4	–	0	1	–	6	–	1
$ – Conference champion

1940 Drexel Dragons football team represented Drexel Institute of Technology—now known as Drexel University as a member of the Eastern Pennsylvania Collegiate Conference during the 1940 college football season. Led by 14th-year head coach Walter Halas, the Dragons compiled an overall record of 2–6 with a mark of 1–1 in conference play, tying for third place in the Eastern Pennsylvania Collegiate Conference.

Drexel was ranked at No. 570 (out of 697 college football teams) in the final rankings under the Litkenhous Difference by Score system for 1940.

== Schedule ==
Date	Time	Opponent	Site	Result	Source
September 28		Juniata*	Philadelphia, PA	L 0–14	
October 5		at Buffalo*	Rotary Field; Buffalo, NY	L 13–20	
October 12		Gettysburg	Philadelphia, PA	L 0–41	
October 19		RPI*^{†}	Philadelphia, PA	L 0–26	
October 26		at Delaware*	Frazer Field; Newark, DE	L 0–19	
November 2	2:30 pm	Lowell Textile*	Philadelphia, PA	W 8–0	
November 9		at Swarthmore*	Swarthmore, PA	L 6–18	
November 16		at Ursinus	Collegeville, PA	W 12–8	
*Non-conference game; ^{†}Homecoming; All times are in Eastern time

== Roster ==
1940 Drexel Dragons football team roster
Players			Coaches
Offense: Pos. / # / Name / Class; TE / 34 / Walt Hutton (C) / Sr	Defense: Pos. / # / Name / Class	Special teams: Pos. / # / Name / Class	Head coach: Walter Halas (Illinois); Coordinators/assistant coaches: Maury McMains (McDaniel); Ralph Chase (Pittsburgh); Albert H. Repscha (Maine); Legend: (C) Team captain; (S) Suspended; (I) Ineligible; Injured; Redshirt
