= 1938 Drexel Dragons football team =

American college football season

1938 Drexel Dragons football
- Conference: Eastern Pennsylvania Collegiate Conference
- Record: 4–3–1 (1–3 Eastern Pennsylvania)
- Head coach: Walter Halas (12th season)
- Captain: William Hartwick
- Home stadium: Drexel Field

1938 Eastern Pennsylvania Collegiate Conference football standings
	Conf.					Overall
Team	W		L		T	W		L		T
Franklin & Marshall +	3	–	1	–	0	6	–	2	–	0
Gettysburg +	3	–	1	–	0	6	–	2	–	0
Muhlenberg +	3	–	1	–	0	7	–	3	–	0
Drexel	1	–	3	–	0	4	–	3	–	1
Ursinus	0	–	4	–	0	0	–	7	–	1
+ – Conference co-champions

1938 Drexel Dragons football team represented Drexel Institute of Technology—now known as Drexel University as a member of the Eastern Pennsylvania Collegiate Conference during the 1938 college football season. Led by 12th-year head coach Walter Halas, the Dragons compiled an overall record of 4–3–1 with a mark of 1–3 in conference play, placing fourth in the Eastern Pennsylvania Collegiate Conference.

== Schedule ==
Date	Opponent	Site	Result	Source
October 1	at Randolph–Macon*	Ashland, VA	T 6–6	
October 8	at Susquehanna*	Selinsgrove, PA	W 19–3	
October 15	Gettysburg	Drexel Field; Philadelphia, PA	L 12–21	
October 22	Juniata*^{†}	Drexel Field; Philadelphia, PA	W 18–13	
October 29	at Franklin & Marshall	Lancaster, PA	L 0–21	
November 5	Muhlenberg	Drexel Field; Philadelphia, PA	L 6–13	
November 12	at Delaware*	Frazer Field; Newark, DE	W 38–13	
November 19	at Ursinus	Collegeville, PA	W 25–0	
*Non-conference game; ^{†}Homecoming

== Roster ==
1938 Drexel Dragons football team roster
Players
Coaches
Offense

Pos.	#	Name	Class
TE	46	Walter Silver
OT	4	Edward Ott
G	31	John Cloak
C	12	William Harwick (C)
G	53	Horace Brosius
OT	59	Leroy Brandt
TE	45	Elwood Conard
HB	6	Tommie Hughes
HB	9	George Nannos
FB	18	Walter Ehmling
QB	63	Kenneth Rodgers
TE	26	Leonard Barris
HB	17	Richard Daub
TE	55	Samuel Engle
HB	25	Howell Evans
G	39	Louis Frick
HB	47	Walter Halas Jr
TE	51	Edward Hale
TE	33	Robert Hanna
TE	62	Walter Hutton
HB	7	William Kulesh
C	43	Hertel Missimer
FB	50	George Mitchell
FB	48	Frank Perry
TE	11	William Poole
HB	36	John Quinn
G	19	Joseph Sack
G	32	John Shallcross
OT	8	Martin Smolak
G	60	Cameron Snyder
HB	30	Lester Stradling
C	22	William Whitley
OT	2	Glenn Williams
HB	38	Harry Wolf

Defense

Pos.	#	Name	Class

Special teams

Pos.	#	Name	Class

Head coach

- Walter Halas (Illinois)

Coordinators/assistant coaches

- Maury McMains (McDaniel)
- Ralph Chase (Pittsburgh)
- Albert H. Repscha (Maine)

Legend

- (C) Team captain
- (S) Suspended
- (I) Ineligible
- Injured
- Redshirt
