= 1929–30 Drexel Dragons men's basketball team =

American college basketball season

1929–30 Drexel Dragons men's basketball
- Conference: Independent
- Record: 8–10
- Head coach: Walter Halas (3rd season)
- Captain: Curtis Dobbins
- Home arena: Curtis Hall Gym

The 1929–30 Drexel Dragons men's basketball team represented Drexel Institute of Art, Science and Industry during the 1929–30 men's basketball season. The Dragons, led by 3rd year head coach Walter Halas, played their home games at Curtis Hall Gym.

Curtis Dobbins was elected captain for this season.

== Roster ==
1929–30 Drexel Dragons men's basketball team
Players
Coaches

Pos.	#	Name	Height	Weight	Year	Previous school	Hometown
C		Curtis Dobbins (C)	—	—		Haddonfield Memorial HS	Haddonfield, NJ
G		Al Eckelmeyer	—	—	So	Northeast HS (PA)	Philadelphia, PA
			—	—

Head coach

- Walter Halas (Illinois)

Assistant coach(es)

Legend

- (C) Team captain
- (S) Suspended
- (I) Ineligible
- (W) Walk-on
- Injured
- Current redshirt

== Schedule ==
Date time, TV	Rank^{#}	Opponent^{#}	Result	Record	High points	High rebounds	High assists	Site (attendance) city, state
Regular season
December 3, 1929*		Hahnemann	W 37–20	1–0	–	–	–	Curtis Hall Gym; Philadelphia, PA
December 6, 1929*		Philadelphia Textile	W 32–30	2–0	–	–	–	Curtis Hall Gym; Philadelphia, PA
January 4, 1930*		Princeton	L 15–26	2–1	–	–	–	Curtis Hall Gym; Philadelphia, PA
January 7, 1930*		Philadelphia Osteopathic	W 35–30	3–1	–	–	–	
January 10, 1930*		Juniata	L 18–22	3–2	9 – Johnson	–	–	Curtis Hall Gym; Philadelphia, PA
January 11, 1930*		at Upsala	L 36–38	3–3	–	–	–	East Orange, NJ
January 14, 1930*		Rutgers	L 25–55	3–4	–	–	–	Curtis Hall Gym; Philadelphia, PA
January 17, 1930*		Swarthmore	L 21–31	3–5	10 – Redmond	–	–	
January 21, 1930*		Ursinus	W 40–30	4–5	18 – Hey	–	–	Curtis Hall Gym; Philadelphia, PA
January 24, 1930*		Muhlenberg	L 36–43	4–6	14 – Hey	–	–	Curtis Hall Gym; Philadelphia, PA
February 4, 1930*		Moravian	W 47–	5–6	–	–	–	Curtis Hall Gym; Philadelphia, PA
February 5, 1930*; 9:00 pm		at Albright	W 38–34	6–6	–	–	–	Armory; Reading, PA
February 7, 1930*		Susquehanna	L 27–39	6–7	–	–	–	Curtis Hall Gym; Philadelphia, PA
February 12, 1930*		Brooklyn Polytech	W 31–30	7–7	14 – Hey	–	–	Curtis Hall Gym; Philadelphia, PA
February 15, 1930*		at Haverford	L 27–33	7–8	–	–	–	Ryan Gym; Haverford, PA
February 18, 1930*		at Delaware	L 22–24	7–9	8 – Redmond	–	–	Taylor Gym; Newark, DE
February 25, 1930*		West Chester	W 37–35	8–9	15 – Hey	–	–	Curtis Hall Gym; Philadelphia, PA
March 1, 1930*		at Pennsylvania Military College	L 36–48	8–10	–	–	–	College Armory; Chester, PA
*Non-conference game. ^{#}Rankings from AP. (#) Tournament seedings in parentheses. All times are in Eastern Time.
