= 1939 Drexel Dragons football team =

American college football season

1939 Drexel Dragons football
- Conference: Eastern Pennsylvania Collegiate Conference
- Record: 3–5–1 (0–1–1 Eastern Pennsylvania)
- Head coach: Walter Halas (13th season)
- Home stadium: Drexel Field

1939 Eastern Pennsylvania Collegiate Conference football standings
	Conf.					Overall
Team	W		L		T	W		L		T
Gettysburg $	3	–	0	–	1	6	–	2	–	1
Muhlenberg	2	–	1	–	0	6	–	4	–	0
Franklin & Marshall	1	–	1	–	1	5	–	3	–	1
Drexel	0	–	1	–	1	3	–	5	–	1
Ursinus	0	–	3	–	1	2	–	5	–	1
$ – Conference champion

1939 Drexel Dragons football team represented Drexel Institute of Technology—now known as Drexel University as a member of the Eastern Pennsylvania Collegiate Conference during the 1939 college football season. Led by 13th-year head coach Walter Halas, the Dragons compiled an overall record of 3–5–1 with a mark of 0–1–1 in conference play, tying for fourth place at the bottom of the Eastern Pennsylvania Collegiate Conference standings.

Drexel was ranked at No. 435 in the final Litkenhous Ratings for 1939.

== Schedule ==
Date	Time	Opponent	Site	Result	Attendance
September 23		Blue Ridge (MD)*	Drexel Field; Philadelphia, PA	W 20–0	
September 30		at Geneva*	Beaver Falls, PA	L 7–13	
October 7	2:00 pm	Hartwick*	Drexel Field; Philadelphia, PA	W 9–0	
October 14		at Gettysburg	Gettysburg, PA	L 7–60	
October 21		Swarthmore*^{†}	Drexel Field; Philadelphia, PA	L 0–14	
October 28		Randolph–Macon*	Drexel Field; Philadelphia, PA	L 6–7	2,000
November 4		at Juniata*	Selinsgrove, PA	L 13–20	
November 11		Ursinus	Drexel Field; Philadelphia, PA	T 14–14	
November 18		at Johns Hopkins*	Baltimore, MD	W 26–6	
*Non-conference game; ^{†}Homecoming; All times are in Eastern time

== Roster ==
1939 Drexel Dragons football team roster
Players			Coaches
Offense: Pos. / # / Name / Class	Defense: Pos. / # / Name / Class	Special teams: Pos. / # / Name / Class	Head coach: Walter Halas (Illinois); Coordinators/assistant coaches Legend: (C) Team captain; (S) Suspended; (I) Ineligible; Injured; Redshirt
