= List of Columbia Lions men's basketball head coaches =

The following is a list of Columbia Lions men's basketball head coaches. There have been 23 head coaches of the Lions in their 122-season history.

Columbia's current head coach is Jim Engles. He was hired as the Lions' head coach in March 2019, replacing Kyle Smith, who left to become the head coach at San Francisco.

No.	Tenure	Coach	Years	Record	Pct.
–	1900–1906	No coach	6	66–29	.695
1	1906–1916	Harry A. Fisher	10	101–39	.721
2	1916–1917	Carl Merner	1	6–8	.429
3	1917–1918	John Murray	1	4–9	.308
4	1918–1919	Fred Dawson	1	3–6	.333
5	1919–1920	Claus Benson	1	4–10	.286
6	1920–1925	Joseph Deering	5	46–40	.535
7	1925–1933	Daniel Meenan	8	94–56	.627
8	1933–1942; 1945–1946	Paul Mooney	10	101–81	.555
9	1942–1943	Cliff Battles	1	8–8	.500
10	1943–1945	Elmer Ripley	2	16–19	.457
11	1946–1950	Gordon Ridings	4	69–20	.775
12	1950–1958	Lou Rossini	8	117–71	.622
13	1958–1960 (Note: Oldham coached the first seven games of the 1960–61 season, with his last game coming in December 1960. Hunter served as interim coach for the remainder of the season, beginning in January 1961.)	Archie Oldham	3	15–39	.278
14	1961*	Kenneth Hunter	1	5–11	.313
15	1961–1974; 1990–1995	Jack Rohan	18	198–247	.445
16	1974–1978	Tom Penders	4	43–60	.417
17	1978–1984	Buddy Mahar	6	70–86	.449
18	1984–1987	Wayne Szoke	3	37–41	.474
19	1987–1990	Wally Halas	3	18–60	.231
20	1995–2003	Armond Hill	8	72–131	.355
21	2003–2010	Joe Jones	7	86–109	.441
22	2010–2016	Kyle Smith	6	101–81	.555
23	2016–2025 (Note: Columbia's 2020–21 season was cancelled due to the COVID-19 pandemic.)	Jim Engles	8	42–99	.298
Totals		23 coaches	122 seasons	1,322–1,360	.493
Records updated through end of 2022–23 season * - Denotes interim head coach. Source
