= 1927–28 Drexel Engineers men's basketball team =

American college basketball season

1927–28 Drexel Engineers men's basketball
- Conference: Independent
- Record: –
- Head coach: Walter Halas (1st season)
- Captain: Carl Gregory
- Home arena: Main Building

The 1927–28 Drexel Engineers men's basketball team represented Drexel Institute of Art, Science and Industry during the 1927–28 men's basketball season. The Engineers, led by 1st year head coach Walter Halas, played their home games at Main Building.

== Roster ==
1927–28 Drexel Dragons men's basketball team
Players
Coaches

Pos.	#	Name	Height	Weight	Year	Previous school	Hometown
G		Carl Gregory (C)	—	—	Sr	Latrobe HS
F		Christian Schwartz	—	—	Sr
G		Albert Hey	—	—		South Philadelphia HS
C		Curtis Dobbins	—	—	So	Haddonfield Memorial HS	Haddonfield, NJ
F		Albert Tucker	—	—	So	Germantown HS	Philadelphia, PA
F		Best	—	—
G		Davis	—	—
F		Fink	—	—
G		Maschal	—	—
G		Logan	—	—
F		Charles Shuipis	—	—
F		J Shuipis	—	—
G		Brown	—	—

Head coach

- Walter Halas (Illinois)

Assistant coach(es)

Legend

- (C) Team captain
- (S) Suspended
- (I) Ineligible
- (W) Walk-on
- Injured
- Current redshirt

== Schedule ==
Date time, TV	Rank^{#}	Opponent^{#}	Result	Record	High points	High rebounds	High assists	Site (attendance) city, state
Regular season
November 30, 1927*; 3:00 pm		Philadelphia Textile	W 57–21	1–0	13 – Tucker	–	–	Main Building; Philadelphia, PA
December 3, 1927*		at Rutgers	L 21–42	1–1	8 – Hey	–	–	Ballantine Gymnasium; New Brunswick, NJ
December 6, 1927*		Philadelphia Pharmacy	W 63–27	2–1	24 – Hey	–	–	Main Building; Philadelphia, PA
December 10, 1927*		at Lafayette	L 22–27	2–2	6 – Shupis	–	–	Memorial Gym; Easton, PA
January 4, 1928*		Schuykill	W 39–24	3–2	–	–	–	Main Building; Philadelphia, PA
January 7, 1928*		at Swarthmore	L 29–40	3–3	8 – Dobbins	–	–	
January 13, 1928*		at Rhode Island State	L 26–48	3–4	11 – J. Shuipis	–	–	Kingston, RI
January 14, 1928*		at Worcester Poly	W 28–24	4–4	10 – Hey	–	–	Worcester, MA
January 18, 1928*		at Haverford	L 30–34	4–5	16 – Hey	–	–	Ryan Gym; Haverford, PA
January 21, 1928*		Seton Hall	L 23–25	4–6	11 – Hey	–	–	Main Building; Philadelphia, PA
January 24, 1928*		at Delaware	L 33–34	4–7	–	–	–	Taylor Gym; Newark, DE
January 28, 1928*		at Pennsylvania Military College	L 19–20	4–8	–	–	–	Chester, PA
February 1, 1928*		at Upsala	L 29–49	4–9	–	–	–	East Orange, NJ
February 3, 1928*		Western Maryland	L 25–33	4–10	14 – Hey	–	–	Main Building; Philadelphia, PA
February 4, 1928*		Albright	W 39–24	5–10	11 – Hey	–	–	Main Building; Philadelphia, PA
February 8, 1928*		Washington (MD)	W 27–22	6–10	9 – Gregory	–	–	Main Building; Philadelphia, PA
February 11, 1928*		at Gettysburg	L 35–54	6–11	–	–	–	Eddie Plank Memorial Gymnasium; Gettysburg, PA
February 15, 1928*		Saint Joseph's	W 27–22	7–11	– Schwartz	–	–	Main Building; Philadelphia, PA
February 18, 1928*		at Seton Hall	L 29–41	–	–	–	–	
February 24, 1928*		Juniata	W 43–32	–	13 – Hey	–	–	Main Building; Philadelphia, PA
February 25, 1928*		Susquehanna	W 48–38	–	21 – Hey	–	–	Main Building; Philadelphia, PA
March 10, 1928*		Lebanon Valley	L 27–38	–	–	–	–	Main Building; Philadelphia, PA
*Non-conference game. ^{#}Rankings from AP. (#) Tournament seedings in parentheses. All times are in Eastern Time.
