= 1928–29 Drexel Dragons men's basketball team =

American college basketball season

1928–29 Drexel Dragons men's basketball
- Conference: Independent
- Record: 10–9
- Head coach: Walter Halas (2nd season)
- Captain: Curtis Dobbins
- Home arena: Main Building, Curtis Hall Gym

The 1928–29 Drexel Dragons men's basketball team represented Drexel Institute of Art, Science and Industry during the 1928–29 men's basketball season. The Dragons were led by 2nd year head coach Walter Halas.

Drexel planned to open their season at the newly constructed Curtis Hall Gym on December 19, 1928, against Penn, however construction was not complete in time, and the game was moved to Palestra. The team began the season playing home games at Main Building, as they had the previous season, and informally opened Curtis Hall Gym on January 9, 1929, against Philadelphia Osteopathic, playing in the unfinished gym.

== Roster ==
1928–29 Drexel Dragons men's basketball team
Players
Coaches

Pos.	#	Name	Height	Weight	Year	Previous school	Hometown
C		Curtis Dobbins (C)	—	—	Jr	Haddonfield Memorial HS	Haddonfield, NJ
G		Al Eckelmeyer	—	—	Fr	Northeast HS (PA)	Philadelphia, PA
		John Johnson	—	—	Fr
		John Kerkpatrick	—	—
		Leo Redmond	—	—
F		Albert Tucker	—	—	Jr	Germantown HS	Philadelphia, PA
G		Albert Hey	—	—		South Philadelphia HS
C		Marnie	—	—
F		Shuipis	—	—

Head coach

- Walter Halas (Illinois)

Assistant coach(es)

Legend

- (C) Team captain
- (S) Suspended
- (I) Ineligible
- (W) Walk-on
- Injured
- Current redshirt

== Schedule ==
Date time, TV	Rank^{#}	Opponent^{#}	Result	Record	High points	High rebounds	High assists	Site (attendance) city, state
Regular season
December 1, 1928*		Hahnemann	W 59–20	1–0	–	–	–	Main Building; Philadelphia, PA
December 5, 1928*		Philadelphia Textile	W –	2–0	–	–	–	Main Building; Philadelphia, PA
December 8, 1928*		at Princeton	L 17–29	2–1	–	–	–	
December 19, 1928*; 8:30 pm		at Penn; Battle of 33rd Street	L 14–35	2–2	–	–	–	Palestra; Philadelphia, PA
January 5, 1929*		at Rutgers	L 23–42	2–3	8 – Dobbins	–	–	New Brunswick, NJ
January 9, 1929*		Philadelphia Osteopathic	W 42–23	3–3	–	–	–	Curtis Hall Gym; Philadelphia, PA
January 12, 1929*		Gettysburg	L 32–45	3–4	–	–	–	Curtis Hall Gym; Philadelphia, PA
January 16, 1929*		Delaware	W 34–26	4–4	–	–	–	Curtis Hall Gym; Philadelphia, PA
January 19, 1929*		at Swarthmore	L 20–30	4–5	–	–	–	
January 23, 1929*		Washington (MD)	L 22–38	4–6	–	–	–	Curtis Hall Gym; Philadelphia, PA
January 26, 1929*		at Brooklyn Polytech	L 21–28	4–7	5 – Tied	–	–	
January 30, 1929*		Upsala	W 25–24	5–7	–	–	–	Curtis Hall Gym; Philadelphia, PA
February 2, 1929*		Schuykill	L 34–37	5–8	– Tied	–	–	Curtis Hall Gym; Philadelphia, PA
February 16, 1929		Haverford	W 27–25 ^{OT}	6–8	–	–	–	Curtis Hall Gym; Philadelphia, PA
February 20, 1929*		Pennsylvania Military College	W 30–18	7–8	–	–	–	Curtis Hall Gym; Philadelphia, PA
February 22, 1929*		Brooklyn Polytech	W 23–18	8–8	–	–	–	Curtis Hall Gym; Philadelphia, PA
February 23, 1929*		at Muhlenberg	W 38–34 ^{OT}	9–8	–	–	–	Allentown, PA
March 1, 1929*		at Susquehanna	W 30–28	10–8	11 – Hey	–	–	Selinsgrove, PA
March 2, 1929*		at Juniata	L 22–27	10–9	7 – Eckelmeyer	–	–	Huntingdon, PA
*Non-conference game. ^{#}Rankings from AP. (#) Tournament seedings in parentheses. All times are in Eastern Time.
