= S. Marsh Johnson =

American football coach (1900–1982)

Biographical details
- Born: January 16, 1900; Pennsylvania, U.S.
- Died: August 1982; Reno, Nevada, U.S.

Coaching career (HC unless noted)
- 1926: Dickinson

Head coaching record
- Overall: 1–7–1

Samuel Marsh Johnson (January 16, 1900 – August 1982) was an American college football coach. He served as the head football coach at Dickinson College in Carlisle, Pennsylvania during the 1926 season, compiling a record of 1–7–1.

== Head coaching record ==
Year	Team	Overall	Conference	Standing	Bowl/playoffs
Dickinson Red and White (Eastern Pennsylvania Collegiate Conference) (1926)
1926	Dickinson	1–7–1	0–2–1	T–4th	
Dickinson:		1–7–1	0–2–1		
Total:		1–7–1			
