= 1930–31 Drexel Dragons men's basketball team =

American college basketball season

1930–31 Drexel Dragons men's basketball
- Conference: Independent
- Record: 10–10
- Head coach: Walter Halas (4th season)
- Captain: Bill Johnson
- Home arena: Curtis Hall Gym

The 1930–31 Drexel Dragons men's basketball team represented Drexel Institute of Art, Science and Industry during the 1930–31 men's basketball season. The Dragons, led by 4th year head coach Walter Halas, played their home games at Curtis Hall Gym.

== Roster ==
1930–31 Drexel Dragons men's basketball team
Players
Coaches

Pos.	#	Name	Height	Weight	Year	Previous school	Hometown
F		Bill Johnson (C)	—	—	So
G		Al Eckelmeyer	6 ft 0 in (1.83 m)	180 lb (82 kg)	Jr	Northeast HS (PA)	Philadelphia, PA
G		Bill Bishop (injured)	—	—

Head coach

- Walter Halas (Illinois)

Assistant coach(es)

Legend

- (C) Team captain
- (S) Suspended
- (I) Ineligible
- (W) Walk-on
- Injured
- Current redshirt

== Schedule ==
Date time, TV	Rank^{#}	Opponent^{#}	Result	Record	High points	High rebounds	High assists	Site (attendance) city, state
Regular season
December 6, 1930*; 8:00 pm		Hahnemann	W 34–21	1–0	7 – Tied	–	–	Curtis Hall Gym; Philadelphia, PA
December 10, 1930*		Philadelphia Textile	W 35–16	2–0	12 – Reynolds	–	–	Curtis Hall Gym; Philadelphia, PA
December 13, 1930*		Gallaudet	W 36–30	3–0	–	–	–	Curtis Hall Gym; Philadelphia, PA
January 1931*		Washington (MD)	L 14–36	3–1	5 – Johnson	–	–	Curtis Hall Gym; Philadelphia, PA
January 7, 1931*		George Washington	L 23–47	3–2	–	–	–	Curtis Hall Gym; Philadelphia, PA
January 1931*		Susquehanna	Postponed (Death of J. Peterson Ryder)					Curtis Hall Gym; Philadelphia, PA
January 1931*		Delaware	Cancelled (Death of J. Peterson Ryder)					
January 1931*		Philadelphia Osteopathic	Cancelled (Death of J. Peterson Ryder)					
January 20, 1931*		at Ursinus	Postponed (Death of J. Peterson Ryder)					Collegeville, PA
January 24, 1931*; 8:15 pm		Upsala	W 28–16	4–2	9 – Yunker	–	–	Curtis Hall Gym; Philadelphia, PA
January 30, 1931*		Gettysburg	L 28–30	4–3	7 – Redmond	–	–	Curtis Hall Gym (1,000); Philadelphia, PA
February 3, 1931*		Albright	L 32–40	4–4	–	–	–	Curtis Hall Gym; Philadelphia, PA
February 5, 1931*		Susquehanna; Rescheduled from January 26	L 27–29	4–5	14 – Yunker	–	–	Curtis Hall Gym; Philadelphia, PA
February 7, 1931*		at Stevens Tech	L 19–39	4–6	– Tied	–	–	Hoboken, NJ
February 10, 1931*		Haverford	W 31–18	5–6	12 – Redmond	–	–	Curtis Hall Gym; Philadelphia, PA
February 14, 1931*		Amherst	W 19–16	5–7	– Redmond	–	–	Curtis Hall Gym; Philadelphia, PA
February 17, 1931*		Moravian	W 61–19	6–7	–	–	–	Curtis Hall Gym
February 20, 1931*		at Susquehanna	W –	7–7	–	–	–	Selinsgrove, PA
February 21, 1931*		at Juniata	L 30–44	7–8	10 – Bublitz	–	–	Huntingdon, PA
February 24, 1931*		Pennsylvania Military College	W 34–27	8–8	12 – Bublitz	–	–	Curtis Hall Gym; Philadelphia, PA
February 1931*		at Gallaudet	W –	9–8	–	–	–	
February 1931*		at George Washington	W 31–29	10–8	–	–	–	
March 3, 1931*		at Ursinus; Rescheduled from January 20	L 31–35 ^{OT}	10–9	–	–	–	Collegeville, PA
March 4, 1931*		at West Chester	L 27–30	10–10	–	–	–	
*Non-conference game. ^{#}Rankings from AP. (#) Tournament seedings in parentheses. All times are in Eastern Time.
