= 1971 Drexel Dragons football team =

American college football season

1971 Drexel Dragons football
- Conference: Independent
- Record: 2–6
- Head coach: Sterling Brown (3rd season)
- Home stadium: Drexel Field

1971 NCAA College Division independents football records
	Conf.			Overall
Team	W	L	T	W		L		T
No. 1 Delaware		–		10	–	1	–	0
No. 5 Tennessee State		–		9	–	1	–	0
No. 2 McNeese State		–		9	–	1	–	1
Samford		–		8	–	1	–	0
Colorado College		–		7	–	1	–	0
No. 8 Akron		–		8	–	2	–	0
No. 3 Eastern Michigan		–		7	–	1	–	2
Arkansas AM&N		–		7	–	2	–	0
Indiana (PA)		–		7	–	2	–	0
Kentucky State		–		8	–	3	–	0
Appalachian State		–		7	–	3	–	1
Northern Michigan		–		7	–	3	–	0
Hawaii		–		7	–	4	–	0
Ashland		–		6	–	4	–	0
Santa Clara		–		6	–	4	–	0
Southern Illinois		–		6	–	4	–	0
Tampa		–		6	–	5	–	0
UNLV		–		5	–	4	–	1
Bucknell		–		5	–	5	–	0
Central Michigan		–		5	–	5	–	0
Milwaukee		–		5	–	5	–	0
Nevada		–		5	–	5	–	0
St. Norbert		–		5	–	5	–	0
Wayne State (MI)		–		4	–	4	–	0
Hofstra		–		5	–	6	–	0
Cortland		–		4	–	5	–	0
Northeastern		–		4	–	5	–	0
Portland State		–		4	–	5	–	0
Ball State		–		4	–	5	–	1
Chicago		–		3	–	4	–	0
Northeast Louisiana		–		4	–	6	–	1
Eastern Illinois		–		4	–	6	–	0
Indiana State		–		4	–	6	–	0
Saint Mary's		–		3	–	5	–	0
Rose-Hulman		–		3	–	6	–	0
Boston University		–		3	–	7	–	0
Drexel		–		2	–	6	–	0
Chattanooga		–		2	–	9	–	0
Rankings from AP small college poll

The 1971 Drexel Dragons football team was an American football team that represented Drexel University as an independent during the 1971 NCAA College Division football season. In their third year under head coach Sterling Brown, the team compiled an overall record of 2–6.

== Schedule ==
Date	Opponent	Site	Result	Attendance	Source
September 25	at Upsala	East Orange, NJ	L 7–13		
October 2	Lafayette	Franklin Field; Philadelphia, PA	L 13–21	5,000	
October 9	Merchant Marine	Drexel Field; Philadelphia, PA	W 14–6		
October 16	at Lehigh	Taylor Stadium; Bethlehem, PA	L 20–48	8,500	
October 23	Albright^{†}	Drexel Field; Philadelphia, PA	W 13–12		
October 30	at Pennsylvania Military	Chester, PA	L 19–40	3,760	
November 6	at Hobart	Boswell Field; Geneva, NY	L 8–35		
November 13	Hampden–Sydney	Drexel Field; Philadelphia, PA	L 6–37	2,000	
^{†}Homecoming
