= 1971 UMass Redmen football team =

American college football season

1971 UMass Redmen football

Yankee Conference co-champion
- Conference: Yankee Conference
- Record: 4–4–1 (3–1–1 Yankee)
- Head coach: Dick MacPherson (1st season)
- Home stadium: Alumni Stadium

1971 Yankee Conference football standings
	Conf.					Overall
Team	W		L		T	W		L		T
Connecticut +	3	–	1	–	1	5	–	3	–	1
UMass +	3	–	1	–	1	4	–	4	–	1
New Hampshire	3	–	2	–	0	4	–	4	–	1
Rhode Island	2	–	3	–	0	3	–	6	–	0
Vermont	2	–	3	–	0	2	–	7	–	0
Maine	1	–	4	–	0	2	–	6	–	0
+ – Conference co-champions

The 1971 UMass Redmen football team represented the University of Massachusetts Amherst in the 1971 NCAA College Division football season as a member of the Yankee Conference. The team was coached by Dick MacPherson and played its home games at Warren McGuirk Alumni Stadium in Hadley, Massachusetts. The 1971 season was the last in which Massachusetts was named the "Redmen," as the university would change the nickname of all athletic teams to the "Minutemen" due to changing attitudes regarding the use of Native American-themed mascots in sports. It was also the first season of Dick MacPherson's tenure as head coach. UMass finished the season with a record of 4–4–1 overall and 3–1–1 in conference play.

== Schedule ==
Date	Time	Opponent	Site	Result	Attendance	Source
September 18		at Maine	Alumni Field; Orono, ME	W 13–0	4,800	
September 25		Dartmouth*	Alumni Stadium; Hadley, MA	L 7–31	16,700	
October 9	1:30 p.m.	at Boston University*	Nickerson Field; Boston, MA	L 21–47	6,100–6,110	
October 16		Rhode Island	Alumni Stadium; Hadley, MA	L 3–31	13,500	
October 23		at Connecticut	Memorial Stadium; Storrs, CT (rivalry)	T 3–3	14,386	
October 30		Vermont	Alumni Stadium; Hadley, MA	W 24–15	7,000	
November 6		Holy Cross*	Alumni Stadium; Hadley, MA	W 38–27	14,500	
November 13		at New Hampshire	Cowell Stadium; Durham, NH (rivalry)	W 38–20	11,762	
November 20		at Boston College*	Alumni Stadium; Chestnut Hill, MA (rivalry)	L 0–35	25,311	
*Non-conference game; All times are in Eastern time

== Roster ==
1971 UMass Redmen football team roster
Players
Coaches
Offense

Pos.	#	Name	Class
WR	19	Steve Schubert
RB	31	George Siegrist

Defense

Pos.	#	Name	Class

Special teams

Pos.	#	Name	Class

Head coach

- Dick MacPherson

Coordinators/assistant coaches

Legend

- (C) Team captain
- (S) Suspended
- (I) Ineligible
- Injured
- Redshirt
