= 1971 Lafayette Leopards football team =

American college football season

1971 Lafayette Leopards football
- Conference: Independent
- Record: 5–5
- Head coach: Neil Putnam (1st season)
- Captains: Edward DiSalvo; Peter Tonks
- Home stadium: Fisher Field

1971 NCAA College Division independents football records
	Conf.			Overall
Team	W	L	T	W		L		T
No. 1 Delaware		–		10	–	1	–	0
No. 5 Tennessee State		–		9	–	1	–	0
No. 2 McNeese State		–		9	–	1	–	1
Samford		–		8	–	1	–	0
Colorado College		–		7	–	1	–	0
No. 8 Akron		–		8	–	2	–	0
No. 3 Eastern Michigan		–		7	–	1	–	2
Arkansas AM&N		–		7	–	2	–	0
Indiana (PA)		–		7	–	2	–	0
Kentucky State		–		8	–	3	–	0
Appalachian State		–		7	–	3	–	1
Northern Michigan		–		7	–	3	–	0
Hawaii		–		7	–	4	–	0
Ashland		–		6	–	4	–	0
Santa Clara		–		6	–	4	–	0
Southern Illinois		–		6	–	4	–	0
Tampa		–		6	–	5	–	0
UNLV		–		5	–	4	–	1
Bucknell		–		5	–	5	–	0
Central Michigan		–		5	–	5	–	0
Milwaukee		–		5	–	5	–	0
Nevada		–		5	–	5	–	0
St. Norbert		–		5	–	5	–	0
Wayne State (MI)		–		4	–	4	–	0
Hofstra		–		5	–	6	–	0
Cortland		–		4	–	5	–	0
Northeastern		–		4	–	5	–	0
Portland State		–		4	–	5	–	0
Ball State		–		4	–	5	–	1
Chicago		–		3	–	4	–	0
Northeast Louisiana		–		4	–	6	–	1
Eastern Illinois		–		4	–	6	–	0
Indiana State		–		4	–	6	–	0
Saint Mary's		–		3	–	5	–	0
Rose-Hulman		–		3	–	6	–	0
Boston University		–		3	–	7	–	0
Drexel		–		2	–	6	–	0
Chattanooga		–		2	–	9	–	0
Rankings from AP small college poll

The 1971 Lafayette Leopards football team was an American football team that represented Lafayette College as an independent during the 1971 NCAA College Division football season. In their first year under head coach Neil Putnam, the Leopards compiled a 5–5 record. Peter Tonks and Edward DiSalvo were the team captains. Lafayette played its home games at Fisher Field on College Hill in Easton, Pennsylvania.

== Schedule ==
Date	Opponent	Site	Result	Attendance	Source
September 18	Rutgers	Fisher Field; Easton, PA	W 13–7	6,000–7,500	
September 25	Columbia	Fisher Field; Easton, PA	W 3–0	6,000–9,000	
October 2	at Drexel	Franklin Field; Philadelphia, PA	W 21–13	5,000–5,200	
October 9	No. 3 Delaware	Fisher Field; Easton, PA	L 0–49	11,000–12,000	
October 16	at Penn	Franklin Field; Philadelphia, PA	W 17–15	11,185	
October 23	Bucknell^{†}	Fisher Field; Easton, PA	L 0–33	10,000–11,500	
October 30	at Merchant Marine	Tomb Field; Kings Point, NY	L 0–20	3,500–5,000	
November 6	at Gettysburg	Musselman Stadium; Gettysburg, PA	W 27–12	3,000–3,130	
November 13	Colgate	Fisher Field; Easton, PA	L 14–51	5,000–7,500	
November 20	at Lehigh	Taylor Stadium; Bethlehem, PA (The Rivalry)	L 19–48	15,000–17,000	
^{†}Homecoming; Rankings from AP Poll released prior to the game
