= 1971 Lehigh Engineers football team =

American college football season

1971 Lehigh Engineers football
- Conference: Independent
- Record: 8–3
- Head coach: Fred Dunlap (7th season)
- Offensive coordinator: John Whitehead (3rd season)
- Captains: John Hill; Gary Scheib
- Home stadium: Taylor Stadium

1971 NCAA College Division independents football records
	Conf.			Overall
Team	W	L	T	W		L		T
No. 1 Delaware		–		10	–	1	–	0
No. 5 Tennessee State		–		9	–	1	–	0
No. 2 McNeese State		–		9	–	1	–	1
Samford		–		8	–	1	–	0
Colorado College		–		7	–	1	–	0
No. 8 Akron		–		8	–	2	–	0
No. 3 Eastern Michigan		–		7	–	1	–	2
Arkansas AM&N		–		7	–	2	–	0
Indiana (PA)		–		7	–	2	–	0
Kentucky State		–		8	–	3	–	0
Appalachian State		–		7	–	3	–	1
Northern Michigan		–		7	–	3	–	0
Hawaii		–		7	–	4	–	0
Ashland		–		6	–	4	–	0
Santa Clara		–		6	–	4	–	0
Southern Illinois		–		6	–	4	–	0
Tampa		–		6	–	5	–	0
UNLV		–		5	–	4	–	1
Bucknell		–		5	–	5	–	0
Central Michigan		–		5	–	5	–	0
Milwaukee		–		5	–	5	–	0
Nevada		–		5	–	5	–	0
St. Norbert		–		5	–	5	–	0
Wayne State (MI)		–		4	–	4	–	0
Hofstra		–		5	–	6	–	0
Cortland		–		4	–	5	–	0
Northeastern		–		4	–	5	–	0
Portland State		–		4	–	5	–	0
Ball State		–		4	–	5	–	1
Chicago		–		3	–	4	–	0
Northeast Louisiana		–		4	–	6	–	1
Eastern Illinois		–		4	–	6	–	0
Indiana State		–		4	–	6	–	0
Saint Mary's		–		3	–	5	–	0
Rose-Hulman		–		3	–	6	–	0
Boston University		–		3	–	7	–	0
Drexel		–		2	–	6	–	0
Chattanooga		–		2	–	9	–	0
Rankings from AP small college poll

The 1971 Lehigh Engineers football team was an American football team that represented Lehigh University as an independent during the 1971 NCAA College Division football season.

In their seventh year under head coach Fred Dunlap, the Engineers compiled an 8–3 record. John Hill and Gary Scheib were the team captains.

Lehigh played its home games at Taylor Stadium on the university campus in Bethlehem, Pennsylvania.

== Schedule ==
Date	Opponent	Site	Result	Attendance	Source
September 11	Hofstra	Taylor Stadium; Bethlehem, PA	W 28–0	6,500	
September 18	C.W. Post	Taylor Stadium; Bethlehem, PA	W 24–14	8,000	
September 25	at Penn	Franklin Field; Philadelphia, PA	L 14–28	12,236	
October 2	at Vermont	Centennial Field; Burlington, VT	W 49–8	7,200–7,352	
October 9	at Rutgers	Rutgers Stadium; Piscataway, NJ	W 35–14	12,000	
October 16	Drexel	Taylor Stadium; Bethlehem, PA	W 48–20	8,500	
October 23	Gettysburg	Taylor Stadium; Bethlehem, PA	W 50–0	11,600	
October 30	Colgate	Taylor Stadium; Bethlehem, PA	L 21–30	10,800	
November 6	at No. 3 Delaware	Delaware Stadium; Newark, DE (rivalry)	L 22–49	21,191	
November 13	at Bucknell	Memorial Stadium; Lewisburg, PA	W 23–0	7,500	
November 20	Lafayette	Taylor Stadium; Bethlehem, PA (The Rivalry)	W 48–19	15,000–17,000	
Rankings from AP Poll released prior to the game
