= 1971 Dartmouth Indians football team =

American college football season

1971 Dartmouth Indians football

Ivy League co-champion
- Conference: Ivy League
- Record: 8–1 (6–1 Ivy)
- Head coach: Jake Crouthamel (1st season)
- Home stadium: Memorial Field

1971 Ivy League football standings
	Conf.					Overall
Team	W		L		T	W		L		T
Dartmouth +	6	–	1	–	0	8	–	1	–	0
Cornell +	6	–	1	–	0	8	–	1	–	0
Columbia	5	–	2	–	0	6	–	3	–	0
Harvard	4	–	3	–	0	5	–	4	–	0
Yale	3	–	4	–	0	4	–	5	–	0
Princeton	3	–	4	–	0	4	–	5	–	0
Penn	1	–	6	–	0	2	–	7	–	0
Brown	0	–	7	–	0	0	–	9	–	0
+ – Conference co-champions

The 1971 Dartmouth Indians football team represented Dartmouth College during the 1971 NCAA University Division football season. The Indians were led by first-year head coach Jake Crouthamel and played their home games at Memorial Field in Hanover, New Hampshire. They finished with an overall record of 8–1, and an Ivy League record of 6–1, sharing the championship with Cornell.

== Schedule ==
Date	Opponent	Site	Result	Attendance	Source
September 25	at UMass*	Alumni Stadium; Hadley, MA	W 31–7	16,700	
October 2	Holy Cross*	Memorial Field; Hanover, NH	W 28–9	13,750	
October 9	Penn	Memorial Field; Hanover, NH	W 19–3	17,600	
October 16	at Brown	Brown Stadium; Providence, RI	W 10–7	10,381	
October 23	at Harvard	Harvard Stadium; Boston, MA (rivalry)	W 16–13	33,500	
October 30	Yale	Memorial Field; Hanover, NH	W 17–15	21,000	
November 6	at Columbia	Baker Field; New York, NY	L 29–31	18,319	
November 13	Cornell	Memorial Field; Hanover, NH (rivalry)	W 24–14	20,816	
November 20	at Princeton	Palmer Stadium; Princeton, NJ	W 33–7	39,000	
*Non-conference game
