= 1971 Columbia Lions football team =

American college football season

1971 Columbia Lions football
- Conference: Ivy League
- Record: 6–3 (5–2 Ivy)
- Head coach: Frank Navarro (4th season)
- Captains: Charles Johnson; John Sefcik
- Home stadium: Baker Field

1971 Ivy League football standings
	Conf.					Overall
Team	W		L		T	W		L		T
Dartmouth +	6	–	1	–	0	8	–	1	–	0
Cornell +	6	–	1	–	0	8	–	1	–	0
Columbia	5	–	2	–	0	6	–	3	–	0
Harvard	4	–	3	–	0	5	–	4	–	0
Yale	3	–	4	–	0	4	–	5	–	0
Princeton	3	–	4	–	0	4	–	5	–	0
Penn	1	–	6	–	0	2	–	7	–	0
Brown	0	–	7	–	0	0	–	9	–	0
+ – Conference co-champions

The 1971 Columbia Lions football team was an American football team that represented Columbia University during the 1971 NCAA University Division football season. Columbia finished third in the Ivy League.

In their fourth season under head coach Frank Navarro, the Lions compiled a 6–3 record and outscored opponents 166 to 136. John Sefcik and Charles Johnson were the team captains.

The Lions' 5–2 conference record placed third in the Ivy League standings. Columbia outscored Ivy opponents 149 to 117.

Columbia played its home games at Baker Field in Upper Manhattan, in New York City.

== Schedule ==
Date	Opponent	Site	Result	Attendance	Source
September 25	at Lafayette*	Fisher Field; Easton, PA	L 0–3	6,000–9,000	
October 2	Princeton	Baker Field; New York, NY	W 22–20	10,037	
October 9	at Harvard	Harvard Stadium; Boston, MA	L 19–21	13,500	
October 16	Yale^{†}	Baker Field; New York, NY	W 15–14	18,530	
October 23	at Rutgers*	Rutgers Stadium; Piscataway, NJ	W 17–16	12,000	
October 30	at Cornell	Schoellkopf Field; Ithaca, NY (rivalry)	L 21–24	23,000	
November 6	Dartmouth	Baker Field; New York, NY	W 31–29	18,319	
November 13	Penn	Baker Field; New York, NY	W 17–3	10,034	
November 20	at Brown	Brown Stadium; Providence, RI	W 24–6	7,200	
*Non-conference game; ^{†}Homecoming
