= 1971 Cornell Big Red football team =

American college football season

1971 Cornell Big Red football

Ivy League co-champion
- Conference: Ivy League
- Record: 8–1 (6–1 Ivy)
- Head coach: Jack Musick (6th season)
- Captains: Tom Albright; Bill Ellis
- Home stadium: Schoellkopf Field

1971 Ivy League football standings
	Conf.					Overall
Team	W		L		T	W		L		T
Dartmouth +	6	–	1	–	0	8	–	1	–	0
Cornell +	6	–	1	–	0	8	–	1	–	0
Columbia	5	–	2	–	0	6	–	3	–	0
Harvard	4	–	3	–	0	5	–	4	–	0
Yale	3	–	4	–	0	4	–	5	–	0
Princeton	3	–	4	–	0	4	–	5	–	0
Penn	1	–	6	–	0	2	–	7	–	0
Brown	0	–	7	–	0	0	–	9	–	0
+ – Conference co-champions

The 1971 Cornell Big Red football team represented Cornell University in the 1971 NCAA University Division football season as a member of the Ivy League. The Big Red were led by sixth-year head coach Jack Musick and played their home games at Schoellkopf Field. The Big Red finished the season 8–1 overall and 6–1 in Ivy League play to win Cornell's first-ever Ivy League championship, sharing the title with Dartmouth, the only team to defeat the 1971 Big Red.

The team was led offensively by future NFL running back Ed Marinaro; during the 1971 season, Marinaro capped his college football career by setting a national collegiate record for career rushing yards at 4,715, which stood until being broken in 1976 by Tony Dorsett of the Pittsburgh Panthers. Marinaro won first team All-American honors and finished in a close second in voting for the Heisman Trophy. On October 30, 1971, Cornell saw its largest home football crowd in the post-1970 era with 23,000 in attendance at Schoellkopf Field (which had a capacity of 25,597) for the day's rivalry match-up against Columbia.

== Schedule ==
Date	Opponent	Site	Result	Attendance	Source
September 25	Colgate*	Schoellkopf Field; Ithaca, NY (rivalry)	W 38–20	16,500	
October 2	at Rutgers*	Rutgers Stadium; Piscataway, NJ	W 31–17	15,000	
October 9	Princeton	Schoellkopf Field; Ithaca, NY	W 19–8	22,500	
October 16	Harvard	Schoellkopf Field; Ithaca, NY	W 21–16	20,000	
October 23	at Yale	Yale Bowl; New Haven, CT	W 31–10	35,168	
October 30	Columbia	Schoellkopf Field; Ithaca, NY (rivalry)	W 24–21	23,000	
November 6	Brown	Schoellkopf Field; Ithaca, NY	W 21–7	15,000	
November 13	at Dartmouth	Memorial Field; Hanover, NH (rivalry)	L 14–24	20,816	
November 20	at Penn	Franklin Field; Philadelphia, PA (rivalry)	W 41–13	43,687	
*Non-conference game

== Roster ==
1971 Cornell Big Red football team roster
Players
Coaches
Offense

Pos.	#	Name	Class
QB	10	Barrett Rosser	Jr
HB	12	John Moresko	Sr
QB	14	Clifford Henry	Sr
OE	17	Dana Williams	So
QB	18	Mark Allen	So
HB	19	Ronald Mower	Sr
FB	36	Robert Joehl	Jr
FB	39	Samuel Costa	So
HB	40	Thomas Albright (C)	Sr
HB	41	Douglas Herron	Sr
HB	42	Richard Russo	So
HB	44	Ed Marinaro	Sr
FB	46	Mark Piscitelli	Jr
OE	47	John Corrigan	So
C	50	Paul Hanley	Jr
OT	52	Joseph Wasilewski	So
C	53	James White	Jr
G	54	James Popielinski	So
OT	56	Mark Newton	So
C	59	Mike Knuff	So
OT	60	Pat Knuff	So
G	63	Anthony Orel	Sr
G	64	Edward Shay	Sr
OT	65	Michael Fleming	Jr
G	70	Michael Phillips	So
G	71	Randy Shayler	Sr
OT	74	Philip Genetos	So
OT	75	Craig Lambert	Sr
G	77	Alfred Van Ranst	So
OT	79	John Cushing	Sr
OE	80	Willis Bradley	So
WR	81	George Milosevic	Jr
OE	82	Keith Daub	Jr
OE	85	Gary Henderson	So

Defense

Pos.	#	Name	Class
DB	20	Larry Sherman	Jr
LB	22	Kenneth Grace	Jr
DE	24	Lamont Garnett	So
DB	25	Peter Knight	Jr
DB	26	James Theodorakos	Jr
DB	27	Steven Lahr	So
DB	32	Robert Fleming	Sr
DB	33	Thomas Rowlands	Sr
LB	35	John Bozich	Jr
DB	37	Allen Matuszczak	Sr
LB	38	Jon Tracosas	So
DB	43	Donald Jean	Sr
DB	48	Kevin Earl	So
DB	49	Danny Smith	Sr
DG	55	Charles Pettit	So
LB	57	Ray Van Sweringen	Jr
LB	58	Robert Lally	So
DT	61	Thomas Guba	Sr
DG	66	Richard Miller	Sr
DT	67	Thomas Rakowski	Sr
DG	68	David Fear	So
DE	69	George Runger	So
DT	72	Daniel Lombardo	So
DT	73	Reginald Nichols	Jr
DT	78	Michael O'Hagan	So
DT	84	Richard Fauntleroy	Sr
DE	86	William Ellis (C)	Sr
DE	88	Bruce Bozich	So
DE	89	Russell LaVoy	So

Special teams

Pos.	#	Name	Class
K	13	John Killian	Sr
K	16	Howard Fries	So

Head coach

- Jack Musick

Coordinators/assistant coaches

- Richard Litchard
- Terry Mallett
- Paul Pawlak
- Carmen Piccone
- William Spencer
- Ted Thoren
- Robert Valesente

Legend

- (C) Team captain
- (S) Suspended
- (I) Ineligible
- Injured
- Redshirt

Roster
