= 1944–45 Drexel Dragons men's basketball team =

American college basketball season

1944–45 Drexel Dragons men's basketball
- Conference: Independent
- Record: 2–11
- Head coach: Maury McMains (1st season)
- Home arena: Curtis Hall Gym

The 1944–45 Drexel Dragons men's basketball team represented Drexel Institute of Technology during the 1944–45 men's basketball season. The Dragons, led by 1st year head coach Maury McMains, played their home games at Curtis Hall Gym.

== Roster ==
1944–45 Drexel Dragons men's basketball team
Players
Coaches

Pos.	#	Name	Height	Weight	Year	Previous school	Hometown
		Larry Tecosky	—	—
			—	—

Head coach

- Maury McMains (McDaniel)

Assistant coach(es)

Legend

- (C) Team captain
- (S) Suspended
- (I) Ineligible
- (W) Walk-on
- Injured
- Current redshirt

== Schedule ==
Date time, TV	Rank^{#}	Opponent^{#}	Result	Record	High points	High rebounds	High assists	Site (attendance) city, state
Regular season
January 6, 1945*		at Haverford	L 25–44	0–1	12 – Horrocks	–	–	Ryan Gym; Haverford, PA
January 12, 1945*; 8:00 pm		Ursinus	L 36–55	0–2	10 – McCracken	–	–	Curtis Hall Gym; Philadelphia, PA
January 24, 1945*		at Ursinus	L 21–53	0–3	–	–	–	
January 27, 1945*; 8:00 pm		Haverford	L 37–47	0–4	–	–	–	Curtis Hall Gym; Philadelphia, PA
February 2, 1945*		at La Salle	L 34–95	0–5	–	–	–	
February 6, 1945*		at Pennsylvania Military College	W 56–40	1–5	–	–	–	
February 7, 1945*		Rutgers	L 32–56	1–6	–	–	–	Curtis Hall Gym; Philadelphia, PA
February 13, 1945*		Coast Guard	L 43–55	1–7	9 – 3 Tied	–	–	
February 23, 1945*		La Salle	L 46–75	1–8	–	–	–	Curtis Hall Gym; Philadelphia, PA
February 28, 1945*		Lafayette	L 30–96	1–9	–	–	–	Curtis Hall Gym; Philadelphia, PA
March 3, 1945*		at Rutgers	L 34–49	1–10	–	–	–	
March 9, 1945*		at Johns Hopkins	L 42–48	1–11	–	–	–	
March 10, 1945*		Pennsylvania Military College	W 59–25	2–11	–	–	–	Curtis Hall Gym; Philadelphia, PA
*Non-conference game. ^{#}Rankings from AP. (#) Tournament seedings in parentheses. All times are in Eastern Time.
