= 1971 Harvard Crimson football team =

American college football season

1971 Harvard Crimson football
- Conference: Ivy League
- Record: 5–4 (4–3 Ivy)
- Head coach: Joe Restic (1st season)
- Captain: David A. Ignacio
- Home stadium: Harvard Stadium

1971 Ivy League football standings
	Conf.					Overall
Team	W		L		T	W		L		T
Dartmouth +	6	–	1	–	0	8	–	1	–	0
Cornell +	6	–	1	–	0	8	–	1	–	0
Columbia	5	–	2	–	0	6	–	3	–	0
Harvard	4	–	3	–	0	5	–	4	–	0
Yale	3	–	4	–	0	4	–	5	–	0
Princeton	3	–	4	–	0	4	–	5	–	0
Penn	1	–	6	–	0	2	–	7	–	0
Brown	0	–	7	–	0	0	–	9	–	0
+ – Conference co-champions

The 1971 Harvard Crimson football team was an American football team that represented Harvard University during the 1971 NCAA University Division football season. Harvard finished fourth in the Ivy League.

In their first year under head coach Joe Restic, the Crimson compiled a 5–4 record and outscored opponents 180 to 167. David A. Ignacio was the team captain.

Harvard's 4–3 conference record placed fourth in the Ivy League standings. The Crimson outscored Ivy opponents 147 to 139.

Harvard played its home games at Harvard Stadium in the Allston neighborhood of Boston, Massachusetts.

== Schedule ==
Date	Opponent	Site	Result	Attendance	Source
September 25	Holy Cross*	Harvard Stadium; Boston, MA	L 16–21	14,000	
October 2	Northeastern*	Harvard Stadium; Boston, MA	W 17–7	15,000	
October 9	Columbia	Harvard Stadium; Boston, MA	W 21–19	13,500	
October 16	at Cornell	Schoellkopf Field; Ithaca, NY	L 16–21	20,000	
October 23	Dartmouth	Harvard Stadium; Boston, MA (rivalry)	L 13–16	33,500	
October 30	at Penn	Franklin Field; Philadelphia, PA (rivalry)	W 28–27	21,770	
November 6	Princeton	Harvard Stadium; Boston, MA (rivalry)	L 10–21	23,000	
November 13	at Brown	Brown Stadium; Providence, RI	W 24–19	11,500	
November 20	at Yale	Yale Bowl; New Haven, CT (The Game)	W 35–16	51,238	
*Non-conference game
