= 1971 New Hampshire Wildcats football team =

American college football season

1971 New Hampshire Wildcats football
- Conference: Yankee Conference
- Record: 4–4–1 (3–2 Yankee)
- Head coach: Jim Root (4th season)
- Defensive coordinator: Lou Tepper (1st season)
- Home stadium: Cowell Stadium

1971 Yankee Conference football standings
	Conf.					Overall
Team	W		L		T	W		L		T
Connecticut +	3	–	1	–	1	5	–	3	–	1
UMass +	3	–	1	–	1	4	–	4	–	1
New Hampshire	3	–	2	–	0	4	–	4	–	1
Rhode Island	2	–	3	–	0	3	–	6	–	0
Vermont	2	–	3	–	0	2	–	7	–	0
Maine	1	–	4	–	0	2	–	6	–	0
+ – Conference co-champions

The 1971 New Hampshire Wildcats football team was an American football team that represented the University of New Hampshire as a member of the Yankee Conference during the 1971 NCAA College Division football season. In its fourth and final year under head coach Jim Root, the team compiled a 4–4–1 record (3–2 against conference opponents) and finished third out of the six teams in the Yankee Conference.

== Schedule ==
Date	Opponent	Site	Result	Attendance	Source
September 25	No. 6 Delaware*	Cowell Stadium; Durham, NH	L 7–40	10,452–10,458	
October 2	at Connecticut	Memorial Stadium; Storrs, CT	L 21–28	10,177	
October 9	at Maine	Alumni Field; Orono, ME (Battle for the Brice–Cowell Musket)	W 24–14	7,800–8,200	
October 16	Vermont	Cowell Stadium; Durham, NH	W 28–7	12,570–12,871	
October 23	Northeastern*	Cowell Stadium; Durham, NH	W 37–7	8,703	
October 30	at Rhode Island	Meade Stadium; Kingston, RI	W 26–0	7,309	
November 6	at Springfield*	Stagg Field; Springfield, MA	T 24–24	3,100	
November 13	UMass	Cowell Stadium; Durham, NH (rivalry)	L 20–38	11,762	
November 20	at Boston University*	Nickerson Field; Boston, MA	L 7–33	3,500–4,008	
*Non-conference game; Rankings from AP Poll released prior to the game
