= Dick MacPherson =

American football player and coach (1930–2017)

- MacPherson at Syracuse

Biographical details
- Born: November 4, 1930; Old Town, Maine, U.S.
- Died: August 8, 2017 (aged 86); Syracuse, New York, U.S.

Playing career
- 1950s: Springfield
- Positions: Center, linebacker

Coaching career (HC unless noted)
- 1958: Illinois (GA)
- 1959–1960: UMass (assistant)
- 1961–1965: Cincinnati (assistant)
- 1966: Maryland (DB)
- 1967–1970: Denver Broncos (LB/DB)
- 1971–1977: UMass
- 1978–1980: Cleveland Browns (LB)
- 1981–1990: Syracuse
- 1991–1992: New England Patriots

Head coaching record
- Overall: 111–73–5 (college); 8–24 (NFL)
- Bowls: 4–1–1
- Tournaments: 0–1 (NCAA Division II playoffs)

Accomplishments and honors

Championships
- 4 Yankee (1971–1972, 1974, 1977)

Awards
- AFCA Coach of the Year (1987); Paul "Bear" Bryant Award (1987); Bobby Dodd Coach of the Year Award (1987); Eddie Robinson Coach of the Year (1987); Sporting News College Football COY (1987); Walter Camp Coach of the Year Award (1987)
- College Football Hall of Fame; Inducted in 2009 (profile)

Richard F. MacPherson (November 4, 1930 – August 8, 2017) was an American football coach. He served as the head coach at the University of Massachusetts Amherst from 1971 to 1977 and at Syracuse University from 1981 to 1990, compiling a career college football record of 111–73–5. He served as a National Football League (NFL) head coach for the New England Patriots from 1991 to 1992, tallying a mark of 8–24. "Coach Mac" was inducted into the College Football Hall of Fame as a coach in 2009.

== Early life ==
MacPherson was born on Nov. 4, 1930, in Old Town, Maine, the second youngest of 12 children. At Old Town High School, he played high school football, basketball and baseball and graduated in 1948. He enrolled at Maine Maritime Academy and then served in the U.S. Air Force from 1950 to 1954 during the Korean War.

MacPherson returned to school at Springfield College (Mass.), where he earned his bachelor's degree in 1958. He was a center and linebacker on the football team, a member of the Chiefs’ undefeated 1956 squad and served as team captain as a senior. It was at Springfield that he met his future wife, the former Sandra Jean Moffitt, when both were sophomores. His alma mater awarded him with induction into the Springfield College Athletic Hall of Fame in 1988, and he earned entry into the State of Maine Sports Hall of Fame in 1985.

== Coaching career ==
MacPherson's first coaching stop was at University of Illinois where he was a graduate assistant coach with the freshman team while working on his master's degree. He moved on to University of Massachusetts as freshman coach for two years and then took an assistant's post at University of Cincinnati under Coach Chuck Studley.

Lou Saban hired MacPherson at University of Maryland in 1966 and then, when the Denver Broncos selected Saban as head coach, he brought MacPherson with him to coach defense.

Named head coach at UMass in 1971, MacPherson led the Minutemen to four Yankee Conference titles in seven years. During that span, he twice claimed New England Football Coach of the Year honors. His 45 victories at Massachusetts rank him third all-time in school history, and his 28-8-1 mark in Yankee Conference games notches a .778 winning percentage, which places him fifth in league history. The first UMass coach to win eight or more games in three different seasons, his nine-win campaign in 1972 tied the school record for single- season victories first set in 1901.

He returned to the NFL as an assistant coach on the staff of Sam Rutigliano with the Cleveland Browns from 1978 to 1980.

=== Syracuse University ===
MacPherson was hired as the 25th head coach at Syracuse University by then-athletics director Jake Crouthamel. Syracuse had made just one bowl appearance in the previous 14 years when Crouthamel turned to MacPherson, who he had worked against while the head coach at Dartmouth.

MacPherson's record at Syracuse was 66–46–4 and included an undefeated season in 1987, when his team finished 11–0–1 and tied Auburn in the 1988 Sugar Bowl. After the 1990 season he left Syracuse to become head coach of the New England Patriots and was replaced by assistant Paul Pasqualoni. MacPherson coached the New England Patriots from 1991 to 1992 and finished 5th in Coach of the Year voting in 1991, turning around a team that went 1–15 in 1990 and leading them to a 6–10 record in his first season. However, in his second season the team started four different quarterbacks and went 2–14. MacPherson was subsequently fired at the end of the season.

During his tenure at Syracuse, MacPherson put together some of the most talented coaching staffs in the country. He employed and mentored future college head coaches Gary Blackney (Bowling Green), Randy Edsall (Connecticut, Maryland), Jim Hofher (Cornell, Buffalo), Bill Maxwell (Hobart), George O’Leary (Georgia Tech, Central Florida), Paul Pasqualoni (Syracuse, Connecticut) and Hall of Famer Jim Tressel (Youngstown State, Ohio State).

MacPherson coached two Hall of Famers at Syracuse: defensive tackle Tim Green (1982–85) and quarterback Don McPherson (1983–87). He also coached two NFF National Scholar-Athletes: Anthony Romano in 1983 and Green in 1985.

== Later life ==
Following his retirement from coaching, MacPherson moved to the broadcast booth, working for BIG EAST TV. He was also a radio analyst for Syracuse football games, first on game-day coverage for local station WSYR and later as part of the program's official radio network. He teamed with Dave Pasch, the voice of the Arizona Cardinals and college football and basketball on ESPN, as well as current Voice of the Orange Matt Park.

He was honored as the Grand Marshal at the 28th Annual Syracuse St. Patrick's Parade in 2010.

MacPherson died surrounded by his family at the Crouse Hospital in Syracuse, New York, on August 8, 2017, at the age of 86.

At the time of his death, he was survived by his wife, Sandra (d. 2024), his daughters, Maureen MacPherson and Janet Sweeney, son-in-law Greg Sweeney, and four grandchildren (Macky MacPherson, Cameron MacPherson, Suzy MacPherson and Molly Sweeney). His grandsons, Macky and Cameron, were both semifinalists for the NFF William V. Campbell Trophy while playing football at Syracuse, and Macky was a graduate assistant coach with the Orange.

The Coach Mac Food Pantry at Syracuse University's Hendricks Chapel was dedicated in December 2024. This pantry was funded with a lead gift from longtime sportscaster Sean McDonough, who met MacPherson in 1980 and worked for him for three and a half years as a work-study assistant.

== Head coaching record ==
=== College ===
| Year | Team | Overall | Conference | Standing | Bowl/playoffs | Coaches^{#} | AP^{°} |
|---|---|---|---|---|---|---|---|
UMass Redmen/Minutemen (Yankee Conference) (1971–1977)
| 1971 | UMass | 4–4–1 | 3–1–1 | T–1st | | | |
| 1972 | UMass | 9–2 | 5–0 | 1st | W Boardwalk | | |
| 1973 | UMass | 6–5 | 4–2 | 3rd | | | |
| 1974 | UMass | 5–6 | 4–2 | T–1st | | | |
| 1975 | UMass | 8–2 | 4–1 | 2nd | | | |
| 1976 | UMass | 5–5 | 3–2 | 2nd | | | |
| 1977 | UMass | 8–3 | 5–0 | 1st | L NCAA Division II Quarterfinal | | |
| UMass: | | 45–27–1 | 27–8–1 | | | | |
Syracuse Orangemen (NCAA Division I-A Independent) (1981–1990)
| 1981 | Syracuse | 4–6–1 | | | | | |
| 1982 | Syracuse | 2–9 | | | | | |
| 1983 | Syracuse | 6–5 | | | | | |
| 1984 | Syracuse | 6–5 | | | | | |
| 1985 | Syracuse | 7–5 | | | L Cherry | | |
| 1986 | Syracuse | 5–6 | | | | | |
| 1987 | Syracuse | 11–0–1 | | | T Sugar | 4 | 4 |
| 1988 | Syracuse | 10–2 | | | W Hall of Fame | 12 | 13 |
| 1989 | Syracuse | 8–4 | | | W Peach | | |
| 1990 | Syracuse | 7–4–2 | | | W Aloha | 21 | |
| Syracuse: | | 66–46–4 | | | | | |
| Total: | | 111–73–5 | | | | | |
National championship Conference title Conference division title or championship game berth
^{#}Rankings from final Coaches Poll.; ^{°}Rankings from final AP Poll.

=== NFL ===
| Team | Year | Regular season | | | | | Postseason | | | |
| Team | Year | Won | Lost | Ties | Win % | Finish | Won | Lost | Win % | Result |
|---|---|---|---|---|---|---|---|---|---|---|
| NE | 1991 | 6 | 10 | 0 | .375 | 4th in AFC East | – | – | – | – |
| NE | 1992 | 2 | 14 | 0 | .125 | 5th in AFC East | – | – | – | – |
| NE Total | | 8 | 24 | 0 | .250 | | – | – | – | – |
| Total | | 8 | 24 | 0 | .250 | | – | – | – | – |
