= 1971 Vermont Catamounts football team =

American college football season

1971 Vermont Catamounts football
- Conference: Yankee Conference
- Record: 2–7 (2–3 Yankee)
- Head coach: Joe Scannella (2nd season)
- Home stadium: Centennial Field

1971 Yankee Conference football standings
	Conf.					Overall
Team	W		L		T	W		L		T
Connecticut +	3	–	1	–	1	5	–	3	–	1
UMass +	3	–	1	–	1	4	–	4	–	1
New Hampshire	3	–	2	–	0	4	–	4	–	1
Rhode Island	2	–	3	–	0	3	–	6	–	0
Vermont	2	–	3	–	0	2	–	7	–	0
Maine	1	–	4	–	0	2	–	6	–	0
+ – Conference co-champions

The 1971 Vermont Catamounts football team was an American football team that represented the University of Vermont in the Yankee Conference during the 1971 NCAA College Division football season. In their second year under head coach Joe Scannella, the team compiled a 2–7 record.

== Schedule ==
Date	Opponent	Site	Result	Attendance	Source
September 18	Connecticut	Centennial Field; Burlington, VT	W 20–7	7,200–7,300	
September 25	Bucknell*	Centennial Field; Burlington, VT	L 6–10	7,200–7,500	
October 2	Lehigh*	Centennial Field; Burlington, VT	L 8–49	7,200–7,352	
October 9	Rhode Island	Centennial Field; Burlington, VT	L 22–34	6,300	
October 16	at New Hampshire	Cowell Stadium; Durham, NH	L 7–28	12,570–12,871	
October 23	at Hofstra*	Hofstra Stadium; Hempstead, NY	L 10–13	5,722	
October 30	at UMass	Alumni Stadium; Hadley, MA	L 15–24	7,000	
November 6	Maine	Centennial Field; Burlington, VT	W 17–13	6,000–6,300	
November 13	at Northeastern*	Parsons Field; Brookline, MA	L 7–42	5,000	
*Non-conference game
