= 1971 Rhode Island Rams football team =

American college football season

1971 Rhode Island Rams football
- Conference: Yankee Conference
- Record: 3–6 (2–3 Yankee)
- Head coach: Jack Gregory (2nd season)
- Home stadium: Meade Stadium

1971 Yankee Conference football standings
	Conf.					Overall
Team	W		L		T	W		L		T
Connecticut +	3	–	1	–	1	5	–	3	–	1
UMass +	3	–	1	–	1	4	–	4	–	1
New Hampshire	3	–	2	–	0	4	–	4	–	1
Rhode Island	2	–	3	–	0	3	–	6	–	0
Vermont	2	–	3	–	0	2	–	7	–	0
Maine	1	–	4	–	0	2	–	6	–	0
+ – Conference co-champions

The 1971 Rhode Island Rams football team was an American football team that represented the University of Rhode Island as a member of the Yankee Conference during the 1971 NCAA College Division football season. In its second season under head coach Jack Gregory, the team compiled a 3–6 record (2–3 against conference opponents), tied for fourth place out of seven teams in the Yankee Conference, and was outscored by a total of 207 to 154. The team played its home games at Meade Stadium in Kingston, Rhode Island.

== Schedule ==
Date	Opponent	Site	Result	Attendance	Source
September 18	at Northeastern*	Parsons Field; Brookline, MA	L 22–36		
September 25	at Brown*	Brown Stadium; Providence, RI (rivalry)	W 34–21	18,000	
October 2	Maine	Meade Stadium; Kingston, RI	L 7–21	10,000	
October 9	at Vermont	Centennial Field; Burlington, VT	W 34–22		
October 16	at UMass	Alumni Stadium; Hadley, MA	W 31–3	13,500	
October 23	at Boston University*	Nickerson Field; Boston, MA	L 7–28	6,646	
October 30	New Hampshire	Meade Stadium; Kingston, RI	L 0–26	7,309	
November 6	Temple*	Meade Stadium; Kingston, RI	L 13–40		
November 13	Connecticut	Meade Stadium; Kingston, RI (rivalry)	L 6–10	6,819	
*Non-conference game
