= 1971 Maine Black Bears football team =

American college football season

1971 Maine Black Bears football
- Conference: Yankee Conference
- Record: 2–6 (1–4 Yankee)
- Head coach: Walter Abbott (5th season)
- Captains: William Swadel; Stanley Maddock
- Home stadium: Alumni Field

1971 Yankee Conference football standings
| | Conf. | | | | | Overall |
| Team | W | | L | | T | W | | L | | T |
|---|---|---|---|---|---|---|---|---|---|---|
| Connecticut + | 3 | – | 1 | – | 1 | 5 | – | 3 | – | 1 |
| UMass + | 3 | – | 1 | – | 1 | 4 | – | 4 | – | 1 |
| New Hampshire | 3 | – | 2 | – | 0 | 4 | – | 4 | – | 1 |
| Rhode Island | 2 | – | 3 | – | 0 | 3 | – | 6 | – | 0 |
| Vermont | 2 | – | 3 | – | 0 | 2 | – | 7 | – | 0 |
| Maine | 1 | – | 4 | – | 0 | 2 | – | 6 | – | 0 |
+ – Conference co-champions

The 1971 Maine Black Bears football team was an American football team that represented the University of Maine as a member of the Yankee Conference during the 1971 NCAA College Division football season. In its fifth season under head coach Walter Abbott, the team compiled a 2–6 record (1–4 against conference opponents) and finished last in the Yankee Conference. William Swadel and Stanley Maddock were the team captains.

== Schedule ==
| Date | Opponent | Site | Result | Attendance | Source |
|---|---|---|---|---|---|
| September 18 | UMass | Alumni Field; Orono, ME | L 0–13 | 4,800 | |
| September 25 | at Hofstra* | Hofstra Stadium; Hempstead, NY | L 22–28 | 1,200 | |
| October 2 | at Rhode Island | Meade Stadium; Kingston, RI | W 21–7 | 10,000 | |
| October 9 | New Hampshire | Alumni Field; Orono, ME | L 14–24 | 7,800–8,200 | |
| October 16 | Connecticut | Alumni Field; Orono, ME | L 7–21 | 8,500 | |
| October 23 | at C. W. Post | Greenvale, NY | L 21–42 | 4,000 | |
| October 31 | American International | Alumni Field; Orono, ME | W 28–14 | 6,100 | |
| November 6 | Vermont | Alumni Field; Orono, ME | L 13–17 | 6,000–6,300 | |
*Non-conference game
