= 1971 Brown Bears football team =

American college football season

1971 Brown Bears football
- Conference: Ivy League
- Record: 0–9 (0–7 Ivy)
- Head coach: Len Jardine (5th season)
- Captains: S. Bennett; F. Walsh
- Home stadium: Brown Stadium

1971 Ivy League football standings
| | Conf. | | | | | Overall |
| Team | W | | L | | T | W | | L | | T |
|---|---|---|---|---|---|---|---|---|---|---|
| Dartmouth + | 6 | – | 1 | – | 0 | 8 | – | 1 | – | 0 |
| Cornell + | 6 | – | 1 | – | 0 | 8 | – | 1 | – | 0 |
| Columbia | 5 | – | 2 | – | 0 | 6 | – | 3 | – | 0 |
| Harvard | 4 | – | 3 | – | 0 | 5 | – | 4 | – | 0 |
| Yale | 3 | – | 4 | – | 0 | 4 | – | 5 | – | 0 |
| Princeton | 3 | – | 4 | – | 0 | 4 | – | 5 | – | 0 |
| Penn | 1 | – | 6 | – | 0 | 2 | – | 7 | – | 0 |
| Brown | 0 | – | 7 | – | 0 | 0 | – | 9 | – | 0 |
+ – Conference co-champions

The 1971 Brown Bears football team was an American football team that represented Brown University during the 1971 NCAA University Division football season. Brown lost every game and finished last in the Ivy League.

In their fifth season under head coach Len Jardine, the Bears compiled a 0–9 record and were outscored 238 to 129. S. Bennett and F. Walsh were the team captains.

The Bears' winless (0–7) conference record placed last in the Ivy League standings. They were outscored by Ivy opponents 162 to 86.

Brown played its home games at Brown Stadium in Providence, Rhode Island.

== Schedule ==
| Date | Opponent | Site | Result | Attendance | Source |
|---|---|---|---|---|---|
| September 25 | Rhode Island* | Brown Stadium; Providence, RI (rivalry) | L 21–34 | 18,000 | |
| October 2 | at Penn | Franklin Field; Philadelphia, PA | L 16–17 | 15,105 | |
| October 9 | at Yale | Yale Bowl; New Haven, CT | L 10–17 | 9,882 | |
| October 16 | Dartmouth | Brown Stadium; Providence, RI | L 7–10 | 10,381 | |
| October 23 | at Colgate* | Colgate Athletic Field; Hamilton, NY | L 32–42 | 7,000 | |
| October 30 | at Princeton | Palmer Stadium; Princeton, NJ | L 21–49 | 14,000 | |
| November 6 | at Cornell | Schoellkopf Field; Ithaca, NY | L 7–21 | 15,000 | |
| November 13 | Harvard^{†} | Brown Stadium; Providence, RI | L 19–24 | 11,500 | |
| November 20 | Columbia | Brown Stadium; Providence, RI | L 6–24 | 7,200 | |
*Non-conference game; ^{†}Homecoming
