= 1971 Penn Quakers football team =

American college football season

1971 Penn Quakers football
- Conference: Ivy League
- Record: 2–7 (1–6 Ivy)
- Head coach: Harry Gamble (1st season)
- Defensive coordinator: Otto Kneidinger (1st season)
- Home stadium: Franklin Field

1971 Ivy League football standings
	Conf.					Overall
Team	W		L		T	W		L		T
Dartmouth +	6	–	1	–	0	8	–	1	–	0
Cornell +	6	–	1	–	0	8	–	1	–	0
Columbia	5	–	2	–	0	6	–	3	–	0
Harvard	4	–	3	–	0	5	–	4	–	0
Yale	3	–	4	–	0	4	–	5	–	0
Princeton	3	–	4	–	0	4	–	5	–	0
Penn	1	–	6	–	0	2	–	7	–	0
Brown	0	–	7	–	0	0	–	9	–	0
+ – Conference co-champions

The 1971 Penn Quakers football team represented the University of Pennsylvania in the 1971 NCAA University Division football season.

== Schedule ==
Date	Opponent	Site	Result	Attendance	Source
September 25	Lehigh*	Franklin Field; Philadelphia, PA	W 28–14	12,236	
October 2	Brown	Franklin Field; Philadelphia, PA	W 17–16	15,105	
October 9	at Dartmouth	Memorial Field; Hanover, NH	L 3–19	17,600	
October 16	Lafayette*	Franklin Field; Philadelphia, PA	L 15–17	11,185	
October 23	at Princeton	Palmer Stadium; Princeton, NJ (rivalry)	L 0–31	21,000	
October 30	Harvard	Franklin Field; Philadelphia, PA (rivalry)	L 27–28	21,770	
November 6	at Yale	Yale Bowl; New Haven, CT	L 14–24	30,430	
November 13	at Columbia	Baker Field; New York, NY	L 3–17	10,034	
November 20	Cornell	Franklin Field; Philadelphia, PA (rivalry)	L 13–41	43,687	
*Non-conference game

== Roster ==
1971 Penn Quakers football team roster
Players			Coaches
Offense: Pos. / # / Name / Class; WR / 82 / Don Clune / So	Defense: Pos. / # / Name / Class	Special teams: Pos. / # / Name / Class	Head coach: Harry Gamble; Coordinators/assistant coaches Legend: (C) Team captain; (S) Suspended; (I) Ineligible; Injured; Redshirt
