= 1937 Drexel Dragons football team =

University football team

1937 Drexel Dragons football

Eastern Pennsylvania champion
- Conference: Eastern Pennsylvania Collegiate Conference
- Record: 6–2 (3–1 Eastern Pennsylvania)
- Head coach: Walter Halas (11th season)
- Captains: George Baker; Bill Graf
- Home stadium: Drexel Field

1937 Eastern Pennsylvania Collegiate Conference football standings
	Conf.					Overall
Team	W		L		T	W		L		T
Drexel $	3	–	1	–	0	6	–	2	–	0
Franklin & Marshall	2	–	2	–	0	4	–	4	–	0
Muhlenberg	2	–	2	–	0	5	–	5	–	0
Gettysburg	2	–	2	–	0	3	–	5	–	0
Ursinus	1	–	3	–	0	3	–	5	–	1
$ – Conference champion

The 1937 Drexel Dragons football team represented the Drexel Institute of Technology—now known as Drexel University—in the Eastern Pennsylvania Collegiate Conference during the 1937 college football season. Led by 11th-year head coach Walter Halas, the Dragons compiled an overall record of 6–2 with a mark of 3–1 in conference play, winning the Eastern Pennsylvania Collegiate Conference title.

On October 9, Drexel overcame Franklin and Marshall 26-25 in conference play. The narrow victory prevented the Diplomats from clinching the conference title, leading to a three-way tie for second place.

== Schedule ==
Date	Time	Opponent	Site	Result	Attendance	Source
October 2		Susquehanna*	Drexel Field; Philadelphia, PA	W 21–0	3,500	
October 9		Franklin & Marshall	Drexel Field; Philadelphia, PA	W 26–25		
October 16		at Gettysburg	Memorial Field; Gettysburg, PA	L 6–13	2,000	
October 23	2:00 pm	Juniata*	Drexel Field; Philadelphia, PA	W 12–0		
October 30		Ursinus^{†}	Drexel Field; Philadelphia, PA	W 6–0		
November 6		at Muhlenberg	Allentown, PA	W 6–0	4,000	
November 13		Delaware*	Drexel Field; Philadelphia, PA	W 8–6		
November 20		at Swarthmore*		L 12–20		
*Non-conference game; ^{†}Homecoming; All times are in Eastern time

== Roster ==
1937 Drexel Dragons football team roster
Players
Coaches
Offense

Pos.	#	Name	Class
FB	10	Williams
HB	63	George Baker (C)	Sr
QB	51	Bill Graf (C)	Sr
HB	16	Tommie Hughes
TE	4	Parks
OT	14	Edward Ott
G	35	Horace Brosius
C	12	William Harwick
G	3	Cameron Snyder
OT	8	Martin Smolak
TE	45	Elwood Conard
TE		Merrill Fredericks	Sr
TE		Matt Donaldson	Sr
OT		Leroy Brandt
OT	11	Bill Schaefer
G		Teyssler
C		Frishmuth
HB	9	Nannos
HB		William Kulesh
HB	5	Harry Wolf
HB		Bill Lignelli
FB	18	Walter Ehmling

Defense

Pos.	#	Name	Class

Special teams

Pos.	#	Name	Class

Head coach

- Walter Halas (Illinois)

Coordinators/assistant coaches

Legend

- (C) Team captain
- (S) Suspended
- (I) Ineligible
- Injured
- Redshirt
