= 1971 Yale Bulldogs football team =

American college football season

1971 Yale Bulldogs football
- Conference: Ivy League
- Record: 4–5 (3–4 Ivy)
- Head coach: Carmen Cozza (7th season)
- Home stadium: Yale Bowl

1971 Ivy League football standings
	Conf.					Overall
Team	W		L		T	W		L		T
Dartmouth +	6	–	1	–	0	8	–	1	–	0
Cornell +	6	–	1	–	0	8	–	1	–	0
Columbia	5	–	2	–	0	6	–	3	–	0
Harvard	4	–	3	–	0	5	–	4	–	0
Yale	3	–	4	–	0	4	–	5	–	0
Princeton	3	–	4	–	0	4	–	5	–	0
Penn	1	–	6	–	0	2	–	7	–	0
Brown	0	–	7	–	0	0	–	9	–	0
+ – Conference co-champions

The 1971 Yale Bulldogs football team represented Yale University in the 1971 NCAA University Division football season. The Bulldogs were led by seventh-year head coach Carmen Cozza, played their home games at the Yale Bowl and finished tied for fifth place in the Ivy League with a 3–4 record, 4–5 overall.

== Schedule ==
Date	Opponent	Site	Result	Attendance	Source
September 25	Connecticut*	Yale Bowl; New Haven, CT	W 23–0	25,778	
October 2	Colgate*	Yale Bowl; New Haven, CT	L 21–28	16,383	
October 9	at Brown	Brown Stadium; Providence, RI	W 17–10	9,882	
October 16	at Columbia	Baker Field; New York, NY	L 14–15	18,530	
October 23	Cornell	Yale Bowl; New Haven, CT	L 10–31	35,168	
October 30	at Dartmouth	Memorial Field; Hanover, NH	L 15–17	21,000	
November 6	Penn	Yale Bowl; New Haven, CT	W 24–14	30,430	
November 13	at Princeton	Palmer Stadium; Princeton, NJ (rivalry)	W 10–6	33,000	
November 20	Harvard	Yale Bowl; New Haven, CT (rivalry)	L 16–35	51,238	
*Non-conference game

== Roster ==
1971 Yale Bulldogs football team roster
Players
Coaches
Offense

Pos.	#	Name	Class
RB	25	Dick Jauron	Jr
C	51	Doug Johnson	So
OT	75	Matt Jordan	Sr
FB	22	Greg Mierzwinski	Jr
QB	10	Roy Purrington	Jr

Defense

Pos.	#	Name	Class
DE	80	Paul Jones	Sr
DB	16	Carl Lewis	So
DE		Sandy Cutler	Jr

Special teams

Pos.	#	Name	Class

Head coach

- Carmen Cozza

Coordinators/assistant coaches

Legend

- (C) Team captain
- (S) Suspended
- (I) Ineligible
- Injured
- Redshirt
