= 1942 Drexel Dragons football team =

American college football season

1942 Drexel Dragons football
- Conference: Eastern Pennsylvania Collegiate Conference
- Record: 2–6 (0–2 Eastern Pennsylvania)
- Head coach: Albert H. Repscha (1st season)
- Home stadium: Drexel Field

1942 Eastern Pennsylvania Collegiate Conference football standings
	Conf.					Overall
Team	W		L		T	W		L		T
Muhlenberg $	3	–	0	–	0	7	–	3	–	0
Gettysburg	3	–	1	–	0	5	–	3	–	0
Ursinus	1	–	2	–	1	1	–	2	–	1
Franklin & Marshall	0	–	2	–	1	1	–	4	–	2
Drexel	0	–	2	–	0	2	–	6	–	0
$ – Conference champion

1942 Drexel Dragons football team represented Drexel Institute of Technology—now known as Drexel University as a member of the Eastern Pennsylvania Collegiate Conference during the 1942 college football season. Led by Albert H. Repscha in his first and only season as head coach, the Dragons compiled an overall record of 2–6 with a mark of 0–2 in conference play, tying for fourth place at the bottom of the Eastern Pennsylvania Collegiate Conference standings.

Drexel was ranked at No. 355 (out of 590 college and military teams) in the final rankings under the Litkenhous Difference by Score System for 1942.

== Schedule ==
Date	Opponent	Site	Result
October 3	Delaware*	Drexel Field; Philadelphia, PA	L 0–40
October 10	Juniata*	Drexel Field; Philadelphia, PA	L 9–13
October 17	at Haverford*	Walton Field; Haverford, PA	L 0–18
October 24	Lebanon Valley*	Drexel Field; Philadelphia, PA	L 12–19
October 31	at Gettysburg	Gettysburg, PA	L 0–18
November 7	at Ursinus	Collegeville, PA	L 13–19
November 14	Susquehanna*	Drexel Field; Philadelphia, PA	W 19–0
November 21	Johns Hopkins*	Drexel Field; Philadelphia, PA	W 29–6
*Non-conference game

== Roster ==
1942 Drexel Dragons football team roster
Players
Coaches
Offense

Pos.	#	Name	Class
QB		Dick Dowd
FB		John Christie

Defense

Pos.	#	Name	Class

Special teams

Pos.	#	Name	Class

Head coach

- Albert H. Repscha (Maine)

Coordinators/assistant coaches

Legend

- (C) Team captain
- (S) Suspended
- (I) Ineligible
- Injured
- Redshirt
