= 1971 Princeton Tigers football team =

American college football season

1971 Princeton Tigers football
- Conference: Ivy League
- Record: 4–5 (3–4 Ivy)
- Head coach: Jake McCandless (3rd season)
- Captain: Robert Wolfe
- Home stadium: Palmer Stadium

1971 Ivy League football standings
	Conf.					Overall
Team	W		L		T	W		L		T
Dartmouth +	6	–	1	–	0	8	–	1	–	0
Cornell +	6	–	1	–	0	8	–	1	–	0
Columbia	5	–	2	–	0	6	–	3	–	0
Harvard	4	–	3	–	0	5	–	4	–	0
Yale	3	–	4	–	0	4	–	5	–	0
Princeton	3	–	4	–	0	4	–	5	–	0
Penn	1	–	6	–	0	2	–	7	–	0
Brown	0	–	7	–	0	0	–	9	–	0
+ – Conference co-champions

The 1971 Princeton Tigers football team was an American football team that represented Princeton University during the 1971 NCAA University Division football season. Princeton tied for fifth in the Ivy League.

In their first year under head coach Jake McCandless, the Tigers compiled a 4–5 record but outscored opponents 195 to 160. Robert Wolfe was the team captain.

Princeton's 3–4 conference record tied for fifth in the Ivy League standings. The Tigers outscored Ivy opponents 142 to 115.

Princeton played its home games at Palmer Stadium on the university campus in Princeton, New Jersey.

== Schedule ==
Date	Opponent	Site	Result	Attendance	Source
September 25	Rutgers*	Palmer Stadium; Princeton, NJ (rivalry)	L 18–33	27,000	
October 2	at Columbia	Baker Field; New York, NY	L 20–22	10,037	
October 9	at Cornell	Schoellkopf Field; Ithaca, NY	L 8–19	22,500	
October 16	Colgate*	Palmer Stadium; Princeton, NJ	W 35–12	14,000	
October 23	Penn	Palmer Stadium; Princeton, NJ (rivalry)	W 31–0	21,000	
October 30	Brown	Palmer Stadium; Princeton, NJ	W 49–21	14,000	
November 6	at Harvard	Harvard Stadium; Boston, MA (rivalry)	W 21–10	23,000	
November 13	Yale	Palmer Stadium; Princeton, NJ (rivalry)	L 6–10	33,000	
November 20	Dartmouth	Palmer Stadium; Princeton, NJ	L 7–33	39,000	
*Non-conference game
