= 1971 Connecticut Huskies football team =

American college football season

1971 Connecticut Huskies football

Yankee Conference co-champion
- Conference: Yankee Conference
- Record: 5–3–1 (3–1–1 Yankee)
- Head coach: Robert Casciola (1st season)
- Home stadium: Memorial Stadium

1971 Yankee Conference football standings
| | Conf. | | | | | Overall |
| Team | W | | L | | T | W | | L | | T |
|---|---|---|---|---|---|---|---|---|---|---|
| Connecticut + | 3 | – | 1 | – | 1 | 5 | – | 3 | – | 1 |
| UMass + | 3 | – | 1 | – | 1 | 4 | – | 4 | – | 1 |
| New Hampshire | 3 | – | 2 | – | 0 | 4 | – | 4 | – | 1 |
| Rhode Island | 2 | – | 3 | – | 0 | 3 | – | 6 | – | 0 |
| Vermont | 2 | – | 3 | – | 0 | 2 | – | 7 | – | 0 |
| Maine | 1 | – | 4 | – | 0 | 2 | – | 6 | – | 0 |
+ – Conference co-champions

The 1971 Connecticut Huskies football team represented the University of Connecticut in the 1971 NCAA College Division football season. The Huskies were led by first-year head coach Robert Casciola, and completed the season with a record of 5–3–1.

== Schedule ==
| Date | Opponent | Site | Result | Attendance | Source |
|---|---|---|---|---|---|
| September 18 | at Vermont | Centennial Field; Burlington, VT | L 7–20 | 7,200–7,300 | |
| September 25 | at Yale* | Yale Bowl; New Haven, CT | L 0–23 | 25,778 | |
| October 2 | New Hampshire | Memorial Stadium; Storrs, CT | W 28–21 | 10,177 | |
| October 9 | Temple* | Memorial Stadium; Storrs, CT | L 0–38 | 10,071 | |
| October 16 | at Maine | Alumni Field; Orono, ME | W 21–7 | 8,500 | |
| October 23 | UMass | Memorial Stadium; Storrs, CT (rivalry) | T 3–3 | 14,386 | |
| October 29 | at Boston University* | Nickerson Field; Boston, MA | W 14–10 | 8,313 | |
| November 13 | at Rhode Island | Meade Stadium; Kingston, RI (rivalry) | W 10–6 | 6,819 | |
| November 20 | Holy Cross* | Memorial Stadium; Storrs, CT | W 24–17 | 14,397 | |
*Non-conference game
