= Wally Halas =

American basketball coach and administrator

Biographical details
- Born: September 28, 1951 (age 75); Evanston, Illinois, U.S.

Playing career

Basketball
- 1970–1973: Clark

Coaching career (HC unless noted)

Basketball
- 1974–1987: Clark
- 1987–1990: Columbia

Administrative career (AD unless noted)
- 1980–1987: Clark

Head coaching record
- Overall: 251–163 (basketball)
- Tournaments: Basketball; 19–10 (NCAA Division III)

Walter Patrick Halas (born September 28, 1951) is an American university administrator and former college basketball coach. He served as the head men's basketball coach at Clark University from 1974 to 1987 and Columbia University from 1987 to 1990. Since 2014, he has worked in fundraising at Fairfield University.

== Family ==
Halas is the grandson of college basketball and football coach Walter Halas and the grandnephew of Chicago Bears founder, coach, and owner George Halas. His father, F. Peter Halas, played football at Drexel University, scouted the for Bears, and was a vice president at Norden Systems.

== Playing ==
Halas was a starter on Fairfield College Preparatory School's 1968–69 state-championship winning team. He and two of his teammates, Jim Navaken and Jim Kroesser, attended Clark University and were tri-captains of the basketball team during the 1972–73 season. That season, Halas won the Bob Cousy Award, which was presented to the most outstanding college basketball in New England six-feet and under. He finished his career as the school's all-time leader in assists and second all-time in scoring.

== Coaching ==
After graduating, Halas spent a summer in Tirrenia, where he founded Italy's first baseball camp. He then spent a year as a social studies teacher and baseball coach at South Windsor High School in South Windsor, Connecticut.

In 1974, Halas was named head men's basketball coach at Clark. He inherited a team that finished 3–19 the prior season. The Cougars continued to struggle under Halas, going 22–46 in his first three seasons. However, in 1977–78, Clark improved to 17–7 and made an appearance in the 1978 NCAA Division III basketball tournament. The Cougars made 10 consecutive NCAA Division III basketball tournament appearances under Halas. They made it to the championship game of the 1984 NCAA Division III men's basketball tournament, but lost to 103–86. In 1986–87, the Cougars went 27–3 and ended Potsdam State's 60-game winning streak in the quarterfinals of the NCAA tournament. Clark made it to that year's championship game, but lost to North Park University 106–100. Halas left Clark with an overall record of 233–103.

Halas also served as the Clark's athletic director from 1980 to 1987 and was the head baseball coach for seven years.

In 1987, Halas was named head coach of the Columbia Lions men's basketball team. Columbia went 6–20 in Halas' first season, then improved to 8–18 the following year. The Lions fell to 4–22 in 1989–90. He resigned on March 16, 1990, to accept a fellowship at the Institute for International Sport.

== Administration ==
In 1991, Halas was named commissioner of the World Scholar-Athlete Games. He founded Always Play Fair, an organization that promoted sportsmanship to children through their elephant mascot – Packy PlayFair.

In 2014, Halas was named vice president for university advancement at Fairfield University. He oversaw the Fairfield Rising fundraising campaign, which raised $218 million - surpassing the original goal by $58 million. The campaign funded the expansion of Fairfield's business and nursing schools as well as the construction of Rafferty Stadium and Leo D. Mahoney Arena. In 2025, he transitioned to the new role of executive director of principal gifts.
