= Maury McMains =

American football and basketball coach (1903–1993)

Biographical details
- Born: February 2, 1903; Des Moines, Iowa, U.S.
- Died: August 10, 1993 (aged 90); Bradenton, Florida, U.S.

Playing career

Football
- 1920–1924: Quantico Marines
- 1925–1927: Western Maryland
- Position: Quarterback

Coaching career (HC unless noted)

Football
- 1935–?: Drexel (assistant)
- 1944–1945: Drexel
- 1948: Drexel

Basketball
- 1943–1945: Drexel ASTU / Drexel

Head coaching record
- Overall: 4–10 (football); 2–11 (basketball)

Maury Harlan McMains (February 2, 1903 – August 10, 1993) was an American college football and college basketball coach. He served as the head football coach at Drexel University from 1944 to 1945 and for the final three games of the 1948 season, compiling a record of 4–10. McMains was the head basketball coach of Drexel's ASTU team (a mixed team of civilians and cadets) during the 1943–44 season, tallying a mark of 3–2. McMains was also the director of the physical training program for the cadets. When McMains was unavailable, Gene Carney (A-3) assumed coaching responsibilities as a player-coach. The following season, McMains was named the head coach of the varsity basketball team, which finished the season with a record of 2–11. He also coached baseball, lacrosse, and golf at Drexel.

== Head coaching record ==
=== Football ===
Year	Team	Overall	Conference	Standing	Bowl/playoffs
Drexel Dragons (Independent) (1944–1945)
1944	Drexel	2–2			
1945	Drexel	2–5			
Drexel Dragons (Independent) (1948)
1948	Drexel	0–3 (Note: Ralph Chase was Drexel's head coach for the first five games of the season, after which McMains took over head coaching duties in order to allow Chase to focus on coaching the school's basketball team. Drexel finished the year with an overall record of 0–8.)			
Drexel:		4–10			
Total:		4–10			

=== Basketball ===
Record table
Season	Team	Overall	Conference	Standing	Postseason
Drexel Dragons (Independent) (1943–1945)
1943–44	Drexel ASTU	3–2 (non-varsity)			
1944–45	Drexel	2–11			
Drexel:		2–11			
Total:		2–11			
