= Eastern Pennsylvania Collegiate Conference (1926) =

Eastern Pennsylvania Conference
- Founded: 1926
- Folded: c. 1943

The Eastern Pennsylvania Collegiate Conference, also known as the Eastern Pennsylvania Intercollegiate Conference, and called the Central Pennsylvania Conference in 1927, was an intercollegiate football conference that operated from 1926 until the 1940s. Its members were located in the state of Pennsylvania. The conference was formed on February 22, 1926, in Harrisburg, Pennsylvania, with five charter members: Dickinson College, Franklin & Marshall College, Gettysburg College, Muhlenberg College, and Ursinus College. Drexel Institute—now known as Drexel University—was added as the conference's sixth member in 1935.

== Football champions ==
- 1926: Muhlenberg
- 1927: Gettysburg
- 1928: Gettysburg
- 1929: Gettysburg
- 1930: Ursinus
- 1931: Ursinus
- 1932: Franklin & Marshall, Gettysburg, Muhlenberg, and Ursinus
- 1933: Gettysburg and Muhlenberg
- 1934: Franklin & Marshall and Gettysburg
- 1935: Franklin & Marshall
- 1936: Franklin & Marshall
- 1937: Drexel
- 1938: Franklin & Marshall, Gettysburg, and Muhlenberg
- 1939: Gettysburg
- 1940: Franklin & Marshall
- 1941: Franklin & Marshall, Gettysburg, and Muhlenberg
- 1942: Muhlenberg

== Yearly football standings ==
1926 Eastern Pennsylvania Collegiate Conference football standings
	Conf.					Overall
Team	W		L		T	W		L		T
Muhlenberg $	3	–	0	–	0	7	–	3	–	0
Gettysburg	3	–	1	–	0	6	–	3	–	1
Ursinus	1	–	1	–	0	1	–	8	–	0
Dickinson	0	–	2	–	1	1	–	7	–	1
Franklin & Marshall	0	–	3	–	1	0	–	8	–	1
$ – Conference champion

1927 Central Pennsylvania Conference football standings
	Conf.					Overall
Team	W		L		T	W		L		T
Gettysburg $	3	–	0	–	0	6	–	3	–	0
Ursinus	2	–	1	–	0	5	–	4	–	0
Muhlenberg	2	–	2	–	0	5	–	4	–	0
Franklin & Marshall	1	–	2	–	0	1	–	7	–	1
Dickinson	1	–	3	–	0	3	–	5	–	0
$ – Conference champion

1928 Eastern Pennsylvania Collegiate Conference football standings
	Conf.					Overall
Team	W		L		T	W		L		T
Gettysburg $	3	–	0	–	0	6	–	2	–	1
Ursinus	2	–	1	–	0	3	–	6	–	0
Dickinson	2	–	2	–	0	3	–	4	–	1
Franklin & Marshall	1	–	3	–	0	4	–	5	–	0
Muhlenberg	1	–	3	–	0	1	–	8	–	0
$ – Conference champion

1929 Eastern Pennsylvania Collegiate Conference football standings
	Conf.					Overall
Team	W		L		T	W		L		T
Gettysburg $	3	–	0	–	0	6	–	2	–	1
Franklin & Marshall	3	–	1	–	0	6	–	3	–	0
Ursinus	1	–	1	–	1	2	–	4	–	3
Muhlenberg	1	–	3	–	0	3	–	6	–	0
Dickinson	0	–	3	–	1	2	–	7	–	1
$ – Conference champion

1930 Eastern Pennsylvania Collegiate Conference football standings
	Conf.					Overall
Team	W		L		T	W		L		T
Ursinus $	3	–	1	–	0	6	–	3	–	0
Franklin & Marshall	2	–	1	–	1	5	–	3	–	1
Muhlenberg	2	–	1	–	1	5	–	4	–	1
Gettysburg	2	–	2	–	0	6	–	3	–	0
Dickinson	0	–	4	–	0	0	–	6	–	2
$ – Conference champion

1931 Eastern Pennsylvania Collegiate Conference football standings
	Conf.					Overall
Team	W		L		T	W		L		T
Ursinus $	3	–	0	–	1	6	–	2	–	1
Franklin & Marshall	3	–	1	–	0	6	–	2	–	0
Gettysburg	1	–	1	–	2	2	–	4	–	2
Dickinson	1	–	2	–	1	4	–	2	–	2
Muhlenberg	0	–	4	–	0	2	–	8	–	0
$ – Conference champion

1932 Eastern Pennsylvania Collegiate Conference football standings
	Conf.					Overall
Team	W		L		T	W		L		T
Franklin & Marshall +	2	–	1	–	1	4	–	2	–	1
Gettysburg +	2	–	1	–	1	4	–	3	–	1
Ursinus +	2	–	1	–	1	4	–	3	–	1
Muhlenberg +	2	–	1	–	1	3	–	4	–	2
Dickinson	0	–	4	–	0	1	–	6	–	0
+ – Conference co-champions

1933 Eastern Pennsylvania Collegiate Conference football standings
	Conf.					Overall
Team	W		L		T	W		L		T
Gettysburg +	3	–	1	–	0	5	–	2	–	1
Muhlenberg +	3	–	1	–	0	6	–	3	–	0
Franklin & Marshall	2	–	2	–	0	4	–	5	–	0
Ursinus	1	–	2	–	1	4	–	3	–	2
Dickinson	0	–	3	–	1	2	–	4	–	2
+ – Conference co-champions

1934 Eastern Pennsylvania Collegiate Conference football standings
	Conf.					Overall
Team	W		L		T	W		L		T
Franklin & Marshall +	3	–	1	–	0	8	–	1	–	0
Gettysburg +	3	–	1	–	0	6	–	2	–	0
Ursinus	1	–	1	–	2	3	–	3	–	3
Dickinson	1	–	2	–	1	3	–	4	–	2
Muhlenberg	0	–	3	–	1	2	–	6	–	1
+ – Conference co-champions

1935 Eastern Pennsylvania Collegiate Conference football standings
	Conf.					Overall
Team	W		L		T	W		L		T
Franklin & Marshall $	4	–	0	–	0	7	–	2	–	1
Ursinus	3	–	1	–	0	3	–	6	–	0
Dickinson	2	–	1	–	0	6	–	3	–	0
Gettysburg	1	–	3	–	0	3	–	4	–	1
Drexel	0	–	1	–	0	3	–	2	–	2
Muhlenberg	0	–	4	–	0	1	–	9	–	0
$ – Conference champion

1936 Eastern Pennsylvania Collegiate Conference football standings
	Conf.					Overall
Team	W		L		T	W		L		T
Franklin & Marshall $	3	–	0	–	1	7	–	1	–	1
Ursinus	2	–	0	–	2	3	–	4	–	2
Dickinson	1	–	2	–	1	4	–	4	–	1
Muhlenberg	1	–	2	–	1	2	–	6	–	1
Gettysburg	0	–	3	–	1	3	–	4	–	1
$ – Conference champion

1937 Eastern Pennsylvania Collegiate Conference football standings
	Conf.					Overall
Team	W		L		T	W		L		T
Drexel $	3	–	1	–	0	6	–	2	–	0
Franklin & Marshall	2	–	2	–	0	4	–	4	–	0
Muhlenberg	2	–	2	–	0	5	–	5	–	0
Gettysburg	2	–	2	–	0	3	–	5	–	0
Ursinus	1	–	3	–	0	3	–	5	–	1
$ – Conference champion

1938 Eastern Pennsylvania Collegiate Conference football standings
	Conf.					Overall
Team	W		L		T	W		L		T
Franklin & Marshall +	3	–	1	–	0	6	–	2	–	0
Gettysburg +	3	–	1	–	0	6	–	2	–	0
Muhlenberg +	3	–	1	–	0	7	–	3	–	0
Drexel	1	–	3	–	0	4	–	3	–	1
Ursinus	0	–	4	–	0	0	–	7	–	1
+ – Conference co-champions

1939 Eastern Pennsylvania Collegiate Conference football standings
	Conf.					Overall
Team	W		L		T	W		L		T
Gettysburg $	3	–	0	–	1	6	–	2	–	1
Muhlenberg	2	–	1	–	0	6	–	4	–	0
Franklin & Marshall	1	–	1	–	1	5	–	3	–	1
Drexel	0	–	1	–	1	3	–	5	–	1
Ursinus	0	–	3	–	1	2	–	5	–	1
$ – Conference champion

1940 Eastern Pennsylvania Collegiate Conference football standings
	Conf.					Overall
Team	W		L		T	W		L		T
Franklin & Marshall $	3	–	0	–	0	7	–	2	–	0
Muhlenberg	2	–	1	–	0	4	–	6	–	0
Gettysburg	2	–	2	–	0	4	–	4	–	0
Drexel	1	–	1	–	0	2	–	6	–	0
Ursinus	0	–	4	–	0	1	–	6	–	1
$ – Conference champion

1941 Eastern Pennsylvania Collegiate Conference football standings
	Conf.					Overall
Team	W		L		T	W		L		T
Franklin & Marshall +	2	–	1	–	0	5	–	1	–	1
Gettysburg +	2	–	1	–	0	5	–	2	–	0
Muhlenberg +	2	–	1	–	0	6	–	4	–	0
Ursinus	0	–	3	–	0	0	–	6	–	2
+ – Conference co-champions

1942 Eastern Pennsylvania Collegiate Conference football standings
	Conf.					Overall
Team	W		L		T	W		L		T
Muhlenberg $	3	–	0	–	0	7	–	3	–	0
Gettysburg	3	–	1	–	0	5	–	3	–	0
Ursinus	1	–	2	–	1	1	–	2	–	1
Franklin & Marshall	0	–	2	–	1	1	–	4	–	2
Drexel	0	–	2	–	0	2	–	6	–	0
$ – Conference champion

== See also ==
- List of defunct college football conferences
