= Drexel Dragons football =

Drexel Dragons
- First season: 1892; 134 years ago
- Last season: 1973; 53 years ago
- Location: Philadelphia, Pennsylvania
- Stadium: Vidas Field
- Field: Drexel Field
- Colors: Navy blue and gold

Conference championships
- EPCC: 1937

Division championships
- MAC Southern Division: 1962
- Fight song: Drexel Fight Song
- Mascot: Mario the Magnificent

The Drexel Dragons football program represented Drexel University in college football. The first intercollegiate game was played in 1898 against Ursinus College, which Drexel won 16–0. In 1909 the school discontinued football for lack of a proper playing field until in 1911, when Anthony J. Drexel’s estate in Runnymede, Delaware County, was used as athletic grounds with a field laid out for football. The team was also suspended in 1943 due to wartime.

Following the 1973 season, the team was once again discontinued due to funding issues.

== History ==
The first football team at Drexel University was formed by students in 1892. The team played its first scheduled season in 1895. Most early games took place in Fairmount Park. On October 9, 1926, the team played its first home game on what was known as "Drexel Field" located at 46th and Haverford Ave, which had a capacity of 5,000. In 1963, the team moved its home games to a new Drexel Field at 43rd and Powelton Ave, which would later be named Vidas field.

The Dragons were members of two conferences in their history. From 1937 to 1940, the Dragons were members of the Eastern Pennsylvania Conference, in which they won the championship in 1937. After 1940, they were again an Independent school until 1958 when the team joined the Middle Atlantic Conferences in the College–Southern division. Previously, other athletic programs at Drexel were members of the conference, however they were a non-football member until the 1958 season. The Dragons remained in the conference and division until 1970, when the school became members of the University Division of the conference. However, that same year the University Division of the conference folded its football division, leaving Drexel an independent until the team was discontinued after the 1973 season.

== Nickname ==
In the time that there was a football team at Drexel University, the athletic teams went through multiple name changes. At different points, the team was also known as the "Engineers," the "Blue and Gold," and the "Drexelites" before finally settling with the "Dragons."

== Conference championships ==
In 1937, the Dragons won the Eastern Pennsylvania Conference championship by defeating the Franklin & Marshall Diplomats, 26-25.

In 1962, the team was Middle Atlantic Conference College–Southern division co-champions, finishing the season with a 5–1 record within the conference.

== Notable players and statistics ==
- Fox Stanton was captain at Drexel in 1892 as a freshman and later went on to have a successful coaching career
- On October 20, 1894, Harry Knight, a member of the football team, suffered a "crushed skull" in a practice game against Penn and later died as a result of the injury.
- Jim Ostendarp played for two seasons on the team from 1946 to 1947 and later went on to play for the New York Giants and become head coach at Amherst College for 33 years
- Glen Galeone, a top running back for Drexel, holds the records for most career rushing yards at Drexel (1,473), and most rushing attempts in a game (29 vs Wagner, 1972)
- Fleet running back Randy Holmes holds the record for the longest run from scrimmage (76 yards vs Lehigh, 1968)
- Coach D. LeRoy Reeves was the first coach at Drexel in 1898, and went undefeated in his first season at 7–0.
- Vince Vidas, Left guard, was awarded first string on the Little All-America college football team in both 1955 and 1956
- The largest margin of victory was in 1934 when Drexel defeated Upsala College by a score of 53–6.
- The worst defeat in Drexel football history was in 1920, when Muhlenberg College defeated Drexel by a score of 82–0.

== Undefeated seasons ==
- In 1898 the team finished 7–0, however a portion of the games were against high schools and academy teams
- In 1955, Team Captain #11 Art Del Campo lead Drexel to a perfect 8–0 record (in which they held every opponent to 14 points or less and won every game by 7 points or more). The Undefeated 1955 Team was coached by Eddie Allen and was inducted into the Drexel University Sports Hall of Fame.

== End of the team ==
Following the 1973 season, the football team was discontinued in order to redistribute the funds among other intercollegiate sports and intramural programs.
