= Walter Halas =

American baseball player and coach

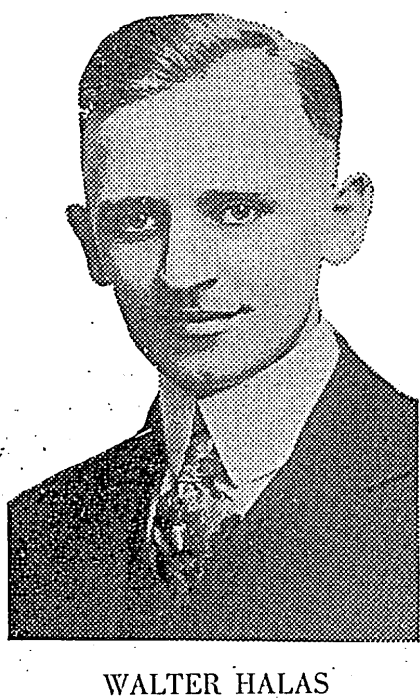
- Halas at Notre Dame, 1921

Biographical details
- Born: January 15, 1892; Chicago, Illinois, U.S.
- Died: December 20, 1959 (aged 67); Chicago, Illinois, U.S.

Playing career

Baseball
- 1914–1916: Illinois
- 1916: Davenport Blue Sox
- 1920: Rock Island Islanders
- 1924: Hanover Raiders
- Position: Pitcher

Coaching career (HC unless noted)

Football
- 1919–1922: Notre Dame (assistant)
- 1923: Mount St. Mary's
- 1927–1941: Drexel
- 1942: Maryland (assistant)

Basketball
- 1920–1923: Notre Dame
- 1923–1924: Mount St. Mary's
- 1924–1927: Haverford
- 1927–1934: Drexel

Baseball
- 1921–1923: Notre Dame
- 1924: Mount St. Mary's
- 1924: Hanover Raiders
- 1925–1927: Haverford
- 1928–1941: Drexel

Walter Henry Halas (January 15, 1892 – December 20, 1959) was an American baseball player and coach of American football, basketball, and baseball. He played college baseball at the University of Illinois at Urbana–Champaign from 1914 to 1916 as a pitcher for the Fighting Illini. Halas later pitched in minor league baseball for the Davenport Blue Sox, Moline Plowboys, and Rock Island Islanders of the Illinois–Indiana–Iowa League. In 1924, he pitched a no-hitter for the Hanover Raiders of the Blue Ridge League.

Halas died in Chicago on December 20, 1959, at the age of 67. He was the brother of George Halas, longtime coach and owner of the National Football League's Chicago Bears, and the grandfather of college basketball coach Wally Halas.
