= 1972 NAIA Division I football season =

American college football season

- Regular season: August–November 1972
- Postseason: November 25–December 9, 1972
- National Championship: Memorial Stadium; Commerce, TX
- Champions: East Texas State

The 1972 NAIA Division I football season was the 17th season of college football sponsored by the NAIA and the third season of the league's two-division structure.

The season was played from August to November 1972 and culminated in the 1972 NAIA Champion Bowl, played on December 9, 1972 in Commerce, Texas.

East Texas State defeated Carson–Newman in the Division I Championship Bowl, 21–18, to win their first NAIA national title.

== Conference realignment ==
=== Conference changes ===
- This was the first season of play for the Great Plains Athletic Conference, which consisted of seven former members of the Rocky Mountain Athletic Conference from Colorado, Kansas, and Nebraska.

=== Membership changes ===
Team	1971 conference	1972 conference
Emporia State	Rocky Mountain	Great Plains
Fort Hays State	Rocky Mountain	Great Plains
Northern Colorado	Rocky Mountain	Great Plains
Nebraska–Omaha	Rocky Mountain	Great Plains
Pittsburg State	Rocky Mountain	Great Plains
Southern Colorado State	Rocky Mountain	Great Plains
Washburn	Rocky Mountain	Great Plains

== Conference standings ==
1972 Arkansas Intercollegiate Conference football standings
	Conf.					Overall
Team	W		L		T	W		L		T
No. 6 Harding +	5	–	1	–	0	10	–	1	–	0
Southern Arkansas +	5	–	1	–	0	8	–	2	–	0
Arkansas Tech	4	–	2	–	0	5	–	4	–	1
Ouachita Baptist	3	–	2	–	1	6	–	3	–	1
Henderson State	2	–	4	–	0	4	–	6	–	0
Arkansas–Monticello	1	–	5	–	0	2	–	8	–	0
State College of Arkansas	0	–	5	–	1	2	–	7	–	1
+ – Conference co-champions; Rankings from NAIA Division I poll

1972 Carolinas Conference football standings
	Conf.					Overall
Team	W		L		T	W		L		T
No. 20 Presbyterian +	4	–	0	–	1	7	–	2	–	1
Elon +	4	–	0	–	1	7	–	3	–	1
Newberry	3	–	2	–	0	6	–	4	–	1
Catawba	2	–	3	–	0	5	–	5	–	0
Lenoir Rhyne	1	–	4	–	0	5	–	6	–	0
Guilford	0	–	5	–	0	0	–	9	–	0
Mars Hill *	0	–	0	–	0	4	–	5	–	0
+ – Conference co-champions; * – Did not compete for conference title; Rankings from NAIA Division I poll

1972 Evergreen Conference football standings
	Conf.					Overall
Team	W		L		T	W		L		T
No. 8 Central Washington $	6	–	0	–	0	9	–	1	–	0
Oregon College	5	–	1	–	0	6	–	4	–	0
Southern Oregon	3	–	3	–	0	4	–	5	–	0
Eastern Washington	2	–	4	–	0	3	–	7	–	0
Eastern Oregon	2	–	4	–	0	3	–	6	–	0
Western Washington	2	–	4	–	0	2	–	7	–	0
Oregon Tech	1	–	5	–	0	1	–	9	–	0
$ – Conference champion; Rankings from NAIA Division I poll

1972 Great Plains Athletic Conference football standings
	Conf.					Overall
Team	W		L		T	W		L		T
Emporia State $	5	–	1	–	0	7	–	4	–	0
No. 11 Nebraska–Omaha	4	–	2	–	0	8	–	2	–	0
Northern Colorado	4	–	2	–	0	6	–	3	–	0
Southern Colorado	3	–	3	–	0	6	–	4	–	0
Pittsburg State	3	–	3	–	0	3	–	7	–	0
Washburn	1	–	5	–	0	3	–	7	–	0
Fort Hays State	1	–	5	–	0	1	–	8	–	1
$ – Conference champion; Rankings from NAIA Division I poll

1972 Gulf South Conference football standings
	Conf.					Overall
Team	W		L		T	W		L		T
No. 5 Northwestern State $	6	–	0	–	0	8	–	2	–	0
No. 3 Livingston ^	5	–	1	–	0	8	–	1	–	2
No. 19 Jacksonville State	4	–	1	–	1	7	–	2	–	1
Delta State	5	–	2	–	0	7	–	3	–	1
Troy State	2	–	3	–	1	4	–	5	–	1
Southeastern Louisiana	2	–	4	–	0	4	–	7	–	0
Nicholls State	1	–	5	–	0	3	–	8	–	0
Florence State	1	–	5	–	0	2	–	9	–	0
Tennessee–Martin	1	–	5	–	0	1	–	9	–	0
Mississippi College *	0	–	0	–	0	4	–	5	–	1
$ – Conference champion; ^ – NAIA Division I playoff participant * – Did not compete for conference title; Rankings from NAIA Division I poll

1972 Lone Star Conference football standings
	Conf.					Overall
Team	W		L		T	W		L		T
No. 1 East Texas State $^	7	–	1	–	0	10	–	2	–	0
No. 12 Angelo State	6	–	2	–	0	8	–	3	–	0
Southwest Texas State	6	–	2	–	0	7	–	3	–	0
Howard Payne	4	–	4	–	0	5	–	4	–	0
Texas A&I	4	–	4	–	0	6	–	5	–	0
Sam Houston State	4	–	4	–	0	5	–	6	–	0
Sul Ross	3	–	5	–	0	5	–	6	–	0
Stephen F. Austin	2	–	6	–	0	2	–	7	–	0
Tarleton State	0	–	8	–	0	1	–	9	–	0
McMurry *	0	–	0	–	0	3	–	6	–	0
Abilene Christian *	0	–	0	–	0	3	–	8	–	0
$ – Conference champion; ^ – NAIA Division I playoff participant * – did not complete for conference title; Rankings from NAIA Division I poll

1972 Mid-Eastern Athletic Conference football standings
	Conf.					Overall
Team	W		L		T	W		L		T
No. 10 North Carolina Central $	5	–	1	–	0	9	–	2	–	0
No. 13 North Carolina A&T	4	–	2	–	0	8	–	2	–	0
Morgan State	4	–	2	–	0	5	–	5	–	0
Maryland Eastern Shore	4	–	2	–	0	4	–	5	–	0
Howard	2	–	4	–	0	6	–	4	–	0
Delaware State	2	–	4	–	0	5	–	4	–	0
South Carolina State	0	–	6	–	0	1	–	9	–	0
$ – Conference champion; Rankings from NAIA Division I poll

1972 Minnesota Intercollegiate Athletic Conference football standings
	Conf.					Overall
Team	W		L		T	W		L		T
Gustavus Adolphus $	6	–	1	–	0	6	–	4	–	0
No. 14 Saint John's (MN)	5	–	2	–	0	7	–	2	–	0
Concordia–Moorhead	4	–	3	–	0	6	–	3	–	0
Minnesota–Duluth	4	–	3	–	0	5	–	4	–	0
St. Thomas (MN)	3	–	4	–	0	6	–	4	–	0
Augsburg	3	–	4	–	0	5	–	4	–	0
Hamline	3	–	4	–	0	5	–	4	–	0
Macalester	0	–	7	–	0	0	–	9	–	0
$ – Conference champion; Rankings from NAIA Division I poll

1972 Nebraska College Conference football standings
	Conf.					Overall
Team	W		L		T	W		L		T
Kearney State $	3	–	0	–	0	8	–	2	–	0
Chadron State	2	–	1	–	0	8	–	2	–	0
Wayne State (NE)	1	–	2	–	0	3	–	7	–	0
Peru State	0	–	3	–	0	3	–	7	–	0
$ – Conference champion

1972 Northern Intercollegiate Conference football standings
	Conf.					Overall
Team	W		L		T	W		L		T
Michigan Tech $	6	–	0	–	0	8	–	1	–	0
Minnesota Morris	5	–	1	–	0	8	–	2	–	0
Moorhead State	4	–	2	–	0	7	–	3	–	0
St. Cloud State	3	–	3	–	0	5	–	5	–	0
Southwest State (MN)	2	–	4	–	0	3	–	7	–	0
Bemidji State	1	–	5	–	0	2	–	7	–	0
Winona State	0	–	6	–	0	2	–	7	–	0
$ – Conference champion

1972 Oklahoma Collegiate Conference football standings
	Conf.					Overall
Team	W		L		T	W		L		T
No. 7 Central State (OK) $^	7	–	1	–	0	9	–	2	–	0
No. T–16 Northeastern State	6	–	2	–	0	8	–	2	–	0
No. 15 SW Oklahoma State	5	–	3	–	0	8	–	3	–	0
SE Oklahoma State	5	–	3	–	0	6	–	4	–	0
Langston	5	–	3	–	0	7	–	5	–	0
East Central	4	–	4	–	0	4	–	7	–	0
Cameron	2	–	6	–	0	4	–	6	–	0
NW Oklahoma State	2	–	6	–	0	3	–	6	–	1
Panhandle	0	–	8	–	0	0	–	11	–	0
$ – Conference champion; ^ – NAIA Division I playoff participant; Rankings from NAIA Division I poll

1972 Pennsylvania State Athletic Conference football standings
	Conf.					Overall
Team	W		L		T	W		L		T
East Division
West Chester xy	5	–	0	–	0	7	–	3	–	0
Millersville	4	–	2	–	0	5	–	3	–	1
Bloomsburg	4	–	2	–	0	5	–	5	–	0
Kutztown	3	–	3	–	0	6	–	3	–	0
Cheyney	2	–	3	–	0	6	–	3	–	0
East Stroudsburg	1	–	5	–	0	4	–	5	–	0
Mansfield	1	–	5	–	0	2	–	7	–	0
West Division
No. 18 Slippery Rock xy$	4	–	0	–	1	8	–	2	–	1
Clarion	4	–	1	–	0	6	–	3	–	0
Edinboro	2	–	2	–	1	3	–	5	–	1
Lock Haven	2	–	3	–	0	4	–	5	–	0
Shippensburg	1	–	4	–	0	3	–	6	–	1
California (PA)	1	–	4	–	0	2	–	6	–	0
No. 9 Indiana (PA) *	0	–	0	–	0	8	–	1	–	0
Championship: Slippery Rock 29, West Chester 27
$ – Conference champion; x – Division champion/co-champions; y – Championship game participant; * – Ineligible for conference title; Rankings from NAIA Division I poll

1972 Rocky Mountain Athletic Conference football standings
	Conf.					Overall
Team	W		L		T	W		L		T
Adams State $	5	–	1	–	0	6	–	3	–	0
Western State (CO)	4	–	2	–	0	6	–	3	–	0
Southern Utah	4	–	2	–	0	6	–	3	–	0
Colorado Mines	3	–	3	–	0	4	–	5	–	0
Western New Mexico	3	–	3	–	0	3	–	5	–	0
Westminster (UT)	1	–	5	–	0	3	–	6	–	0
Fort Lewis	1	–	5	–	0	2	–	6	–	0
$ – Conference champion

1972 Southwestern Athletic Conference football standings
	Conf.					Overall
Team	W		L		T	W		L		T
No. 4 / T–8 Grambling +	5	–	1	–	0	11	–	2	–	0
Jackson State +	5	–	1	–	0	8	–	3	–	0
Alcorn A&M	4	–	1	–	1	5	–	3	–	1
Texas Southern	3	–	2	–	1	5	–	4	–	1
Mississippi Valley State	1	–	5	–	0	5	–	5	–	0
Prairie View A&M	1	–	5	–	0	5	–	5	–	0
Southern	1	–	5	–	0	2	–	7	–	1
+ – Conference co-champions; Rankings from NAIA Division I poll and AP small college poll

1972 West Virginia Intercollegiate Athletic Conference football standings
	Conf.					Overall
Team	W		L		T	W		L		T
Shepherd $	5	–	0	–	0	7	–	3	–	0
Bluefield State	5	–	1	–	0	7	–	2	–	0
West Liberty State	5	–	2	–	0	7	–	2	–	0
Salem	6	–	3	–	0	6	–	3	–	0
Glenville State	5	–	3	–	0	6	–	3	–	0
West Virginia State	4	–	3	–	0	4	–	7	–	0
Concord	2	–	6	–	0	3	–	6	–	0
Fairmont State	1	–	5	–	0	2	–	7	–	0
West Virginia Tech	1	–	6	–	0	1	–	8	–	0
West Virginia Wesleyan	1	–	6	–	0	2	–	7	–	0
$ – Conference champion; Conference standings based on power ratings

1972 Wisconsin State University Conference football standings
	Conf.					Overall
Team	W		L		T	W		L		T
Wisconsin–Oshkosh $	8	–	0	–	0	8	–	2	–	0
No. T–16 Wisconsin–La Crosse	7	–	1	–	0	8	–	2	–	0
Wisconsin–Whitewater	6	–	2	–	0	7	–	3	–	0
Wisconsin–Platteville	4	–	4	–	0	6	–	4	–	0
Wisconsin–River Falls	4	–	4	–	0	4	–	6	–	0
Wisconsin–Eau Claire	2	–	6	–	0	3	–	7	–	0
Wisconsin–Stevens Point	2	–	6	–	0	2	–	8	–	0
Wisconsin–Stout	2	–	6	–	0	2	–	8	–	0
Wisconsin–Superior	1	–	7	–	0	1	–	9	–	0
$ – Conference champion; Rankings from NAIA Division I poll

1972 NAIA Division I independents football records
	Conf.			Overall
Team	W	L	T	W		L		T
No. 2 Carson–Newman ^		–		10	–	2	–	0
Hillsdale		–		6	–	2	–	0
Wofford		–		6	–	4	–	0
Kentucky State		–		4	–	6	–	0
Eastern New Mexico		–		2	–	8	–	0
New Mexico Highlands		–		2	–	7	–	0
^ – NAIA Division I playoff participant; Rankings from NAIA Division I poll

== Postseason ==
Semifinals; November 25, 1972
Livingston	7
Carson–Newman*	7†
Central State (OK)	0
East Texas State*	54

1972 Champion Bowl; December 9, 1972; Commerce, TX
Carson–Newman	18
East Texas State*	21

† The game ended in a tie, and a tiebreaker system was used to determine which team advanced to the final. The first tiebreaker step was first downs, and each team had 11. The second tiebreaker step was offensive penetrations inside the opponent's 20-yard line, which favored Carson–Newman, 2–1.

== See also ==
- 1972 NAIA Division II football season
- 1972 NCAA University Division football season
- 1972 NCAA College Division football season
