= 1972 East Tennessee State Buccaneers football team =

American college football season

1972 East Tennessee State Buccaneers football
- Conference: Ohio Valley Conference
- Record: 3–7 (2–5 OVC)
- Head coach: John Robert Bell (7th season)
- Home stadium: Memorial Stadium

1972 Ohio Valley Conference football standings
	Conf.					Overall
Team	W		L		T	W		L		T
No. 8 Tennessee Tech $	7	–	0	–	0	10	–	2	–	0
Western Kentucky	5	–	2	–	0	7	–	3	–	0
Middle Tennessee	4	–	2	–	1	7	–	3	–	1
Morehead State	3	–	3	–	1	3	–	6	–	1
Eastern Kentucky	3	–	4	–	0	5	–	6	–	0
Murray State	2	–	5	–	0	4	–	6	–	0
East Tennessee State	2	–	5	–	0	3	–	7	–	0
Austin Peay	1	–	6	–	0	3	–	8	–	0
$ – Conference champion; Rankings from UPI small college poll

The 1972 East Tennessee State Buccaneers football team represented East Tennessee State University as a member of the Ohio Valley Conference (OVC) during the 1972 NCAA College Division football season. Led by seventh-year head coach John Robert Bell, the Buccaneers compiled an overall record of 3–7, with a mark of 2–5 in conference play, and finished tied for sixth in the OVC.

== Schedule ==
Date	Opponent	Site	Result	Attendance	Source
September 16	at Carson–Newman*	Burke–Tarr Stadium; Jefferson City, TN	L 29–52		
September 23	at Eastern Kentucky	Hanger Field; Richmond, KY	W 28–12	16,500	
September 30	Western Kentucky	Memorial Stadium; Johnson City, TN	L 7–17	6,932	
October 7	Tennessee Tech	Memorial Stadium; Johnson City, TN	L 23–24	6,223	
October 21	at Murray State	Cutchin Stadium; Murray, KY	L 6–17	8,500	
October 28	at Appalachian State*	Conrad Stadium; Boone, NC	L 34–35	6,200	
November 4	Morehead State^{†}	Memorial Stadium; Johnson City, TN	L 7–14	8,316	
November 11	at Middle Tennessee	Horace Jones Field; Murfreesboro, TN	L 24–34	6,500	
November 18	Austin Peay	Memorial Stadium; Johnson City, TN	W 20–16	2,000	
November 25	Chattanooga*	Memorial Stadium; Johnson City, TN	W 35–0	2,500	
*Non-conference game; ^{†}Homecoming; Source:
