= George Quiett =

American football coach

Biographical details
- Born: September 6, 1928
- Died: December 28, 2003 (aged 75)

Coaching career (HC unless noted)
- 1961–1962: St. Augustine's
- 1963–1967: North Carolina College (assistant)
- 1968–1972: North Carolina College/Central

Head coaching record
- Overall: 42–21–2
- Bowls: 0–2

Accomplishments and honors

Championships
- 1 MEAC (1972)

Awards
- MEAC Coach of the Year (1971)

George L. Quiett Jr. (September 6, 1928 – December 28, 2003) was an American football coach. He served consecutively as the head football coach at St. Augustine's University in Raleigh, North Carolina from 1961 to 1962 and North Carolina Central University in Durham, North Carolina from 1968 until 1972, compiling a career college football record of 42–21–2. Quiett came to North Carolina College—as North Carolina Central University was known prior to 1969—as an assistant coach in 1963.

== Head coaching record ==
=== College ===
| Year | Team | Overall | Conference | Standing | Bowl/playoffs |
|---|---|---|---|---|---|
St. Augustine's Falcons (Central Intercollegiate Athletic Association) (1961–1962)
| 1961 | St. Augustine's | 4–5 | 3–5 | 13th | |
| 1962 | St. Augustine's | 4–4–1 | 3–4–1 | 11th | |
| St. Augustine's: | | 8–9–1 | 6–9–1 | | |
North Carolina College/Central Eagles (Central Intercollegiate Athletic Association) (1968–1970)
| 1968 | North Carolina College | 6–2 | 6–2 | 3rd | |
| 1969 | North Carolina Central | 7–2–1 | 7–1–1 | 2nd | L Boardwalk |
| 1970 | North Carolina Central | 5–4 | 3–1 | 3rd (Southern) | |
North Carolina College/Central Eagles (Mid-Eastern Athletic Conference) (1971–1972)
| 1971 | North Carolina Central | 7–2 | 5–1 | 2nd | |
| 1972 | North Carolina Central | 9–2 | 5–1 | 1st | L Pelican |
| North Carolina College/Central: | | 34–12–1 | 26–6–1 | | |
| Total: | | 42–21–2 | | | |
National championship Conference title Conference division title or championship game berth
