= Charles Bates (American football) =

American football coach

Biographical details
- Born: c. 1934

Playing career
- c. 1955: Alabama A&M
- 1957–1958: Fort Meade

Coaching career (HC unless noted)
- 1963–1965: Kentucky State (defensive coach)
- 1966: Southern (defensive coach)
- 1967–1969: Kentucky State
- 1972–1977: Southern

Head coaching record
- Overall: 43–42–3
- Bowls: 1–0

Charles Adams Bates (born c. 1934) is an American former football player and coach. He served as the head football coach at Kentucky State University from 1967 to 1969 and Southern University from 1972 to 1977.

== Early life and playing career ==
A native of Birmingham, Alabama, Bates played college football at Alabama A&M College—now known as Alabama A&M University—and then in 1957 and 1958 with the Fort Meade football team while serving in the United States Army. He signed with the Chicago Bears of the National Football League (NFL) as a rookie in 1959.

== Coaching career ==
Bates began his coaching career at the high school level, at West Highland in Fayette, Alabama and Westfield in Birmingham. He spent three seasons as a defensive assistant coach at Kentucky State University before being hired in the same capacity at Southern University in 1966. After a year at Southern, Bates returned to Kentucky State at head football coach.

In 1972, Bates succeeded Alva Tabor as Southern University's head football coach. After a 2–7–1 start to his career at Southern in 1982, Bates and the Jaguars posted two eight-win seasons (1974, 1976) and a nine win-season in 1975 in which Southern captured a share of the Southwestern Athletic Conference (SWAC) title and won the Pelican Bowl over South Carolina State. After a rough 3–3–1 start to the 1977 season, Bates stepped down mid-season, and Ken Tillage took over coaching duties for the rest of the season.

== Head coaching record ==
Year	Team	Overall	Conference	Standing	Bowl/playoffs	AP^{#}
Kentucky State Thorobreds (NCAA College Division independent) (1967–1969)
1967	Kentucky State	5–3–1				
1968	Kentucky State	2–7				
1969	Kentucky State	0–8				
Kentucky State:		7–18–1				
Southern Jaguars (Southwestern Athletic Conference) (1972–1977)
1972	Southern	2–8–1	1–5	T–5th		
1973	Southern	6–4	3–3	4th		
1974	Southern	8–3	3–3	4th		
1975	Southern	9–3	4–2	T–1st	W Pelican	
1976	Southern	8–3	4–2	T–2nd		
1977	Southern	3–3–1	1–3–1			
Southern:		36–24–2	16–18–1			
Total:		43–42–3				
