= 1972 college football season =

1972 college football season may refer to:

- 1972 NCAA University Division football season
- 1972 NCAA College Division football season
- 1972 NAIA Division I football season
- 1972 NAIA Division II football season
