= James Williams (American football coach) =

American football coach (1923–1999)

Biographical details
- Born: January 6, 1923; Tampa, Florida, U.S.
- Died: August 8, 1999 (aged 76); Tampa, Florida, U.S.

Playing career
- 1942: Florida A&M
- 1946–1948: Florida A&M
- Position: Quarterback

Coaching career (HC unless noted)
- 1949–1965: Don Thompson Vocational / Blake HS (FL)
- 1966: Southern (assistant)
- 1969: Blake HS (FL) (assistant)
- 1970–1971: Tampa (assistant)
- 1972–1973: Florida A&M

Head coaching record
- Overall: 10–12 (college); 88–11–3 (high school)
- Bowls: 2–0

James J. "Big Jim" Williams (January 6, 1923 – August 8, 1999) was an American high school and college football coach. He served as the head football coach at Don Thompson Vocational/Blake High School in Tampa, Florida from 1949 to 1965 and for Florida A&M University (FAMU) from 1972 to 1973.

== Biography ==
A native of Tampa, Florida, Williams attended George S. Middleton High School where he was a part of two state football championships. After he graduated, Williams attended Florida A&M and was the only freshman to start on their 1942 team. He subsequently left A&M and served in the Army, predominantly in the South West Pacific theatre of World War II, before he returned to A&M in 1946. From 1946 to 1948, Williams started at quarterback for the Rattlers and led them to an overall record of 23–7–1 and three Southern Intercollegiate Athletic Conference championships.

After he graduated from A&M, Williams was hired as head coach at Don Thompson Vocational High School (which subsequently became Howard W. Blake High School). As head coach, he led the school to an overall record of 88–11–3 and Florida Interscholastic Athletic Association championships in 1962 and 1964. He resigned from Blake in May 1966 and took a job as an assistant coach at Southern for their 1966 team.

Williams returned to Tampa during the 1967 Tampa riots to help ease tensions and remained out of coaching for the subsequent two years. He returned to coaching as an assistant coach back at Blake for their 1969 season and help lead them to a state championship. After he served as an assistant at Tampa in 1970 and 1971, Williams was hired as head coach at Florida A&M. After a pair of losing seasons with the Rattlers, Williams was fired in April 1974 after he did not resign at the request of the University preseident in the previous March.

After he left A&M, Williams returned to Tampa and worked for Hillsborough County Public Schools. He died on August 8, 1999.

== Head coaching record ==
=== College ===
Year	Team	Overall	Conference	Standing	Bowl/playoffs
Florida A&M Rattlers (Southern Intercollegiate Athletic Conference) (1972–1973)
1972	Florida A&M	5–6	2–3	(Division I)	W Orange Blossom Classic
1973	Florida A&M	5–6	4–1	2nd (Division I)	W Orange Blossom Classic
Florida A&M:		10–12	6–4		
Total:		10–12			
