= 1972 Northern Iowa Panthers football team =

American college football season

1972 Northern Iowa Panthers football
- Conference: North Central Conference
- Record: 4–5 (3–4 NCC)
- Head coach: Stan Sheriff (13th season)
- Defensive coordinator: Dennis Remmert (2nd season)
- Home stadium: O. R. Latham Stadium

1972 North Central Conference football standings
	Conf.					Overall
Team	W		L		T	W		L		T
No. T–6 North Dakota +	6	–	1	–	0	10	–	1	–	0
No. T–6 South Dakota +	6	–	1	–	0	9	–	1	–	0
North Dakota State +	6	–	1	–	0	8	–	2	–	0
Mankato State	3	–	4	–	0	6	–	5	–	0
Northern Iowa	3	–	4	–	0	4	–	5	–	0
South Dakota State	2	–	5	–	0	6	–	5	–	0
Morningside	1	–	6	–	0	2	–	8	–	0
Augustana (SD)	1	–	6	–	0	2	–	8	–	0
+ – Conference co-champions; Rankings from AP small college poll

The 1972 Northern Iowa Panthers football team was an American football team that represented the University of Northern Iowa as a member of the North Central Conference (NCC) during the 1972 NCAA College Division football season. In its 13th season under head coach Stan Sheriff, the team compiled a 4–5 record (3–4 in conference games) and tied for fourth place in the NCC.

The team's statistical leaders included sophomore fullback Scott Swatzendruber (547 rushing yards, 44 points scored), junior quarterback Ron Schooley (363 passing yards), and senior split end Bruce Dinnebier (186 receiving yards). Two Northern Iowa players were named to the all-NCC team: offensive tackle Tom Jones and free safety Mike Woodley. Woodley also set a school record which still stands as of 2026 with an average of 17.20 yards on 10 punt returns. Mike Butler set a school record with a 78-yard punt against Augustana (SD).

The team played its home games at O. R. Latham Stadium in Cedar Falls, Iowa.

== Schedule ==
Date	Opponent	Site	Result	Attendance	Source
September 9	Wisconsin–Stevens Point*	O. R. Latham Stadium; Cedar Falls, IA	W 41–6	7,160	
September 16	at Illinois State*	Hancock Stadium; Normal, IL	L 14–24	11,401	
September 23	Mankato State	O. R. Latham Stadium; Cedar Falls, IA	W 21–0	5,301	
September 30	at South Dakota	Inman Field; Vermillion, SD	L 7–21	9,600–9,660	
October 7	North Dakota State	O. R. Latham Stadium; Cedar Falls, IA	L 0–42	7,300–7,364	
October 14	Drake	O. R. Latham Stadium; Cedar Falls, IA	L 14–21	7,220	
October 21	Morningside	O. R. Latham Stadium; Cedar Falls, IA	W 27–13	5,975	
October 28	at No. 8 North Dakota	Memorial Stadium; Grand Forks, ND	L 9–38	3,506–4,000	
November 4	South Dakota State	O. R. Latham Stadium; Cedar Falls, IA	W 32–0	5,204	
November 11	at Augustana (SD)	Howard Wood Field; Sioux Falls, SD	L 14–20	2,140	
*Non-conference game; Rankings from AP Poll released prior to the game
