= 1972 Florida A&M Rattlers football team =

American college football season

1972 Florida A&M Rattlers football

Orange Blossom Classic, W 41–21 vs. Maryland Eastern Shore
- Conference: Southern Intercollegiate Athletic Conference
- Division I
- Record: 5–6 (2–3 SIAC)
- Head coach: James "Big Jim" Williams (1st season)
- Home stadium: Bragg Memorial Stadium

The 1972 Florida A&M Rattlers football team represented Florida A&M University as a member of Division I of the Southern Intercollegiate Athletic Conference (SIAC) during the 1972 NCAA College Division football season. Led by first-year head coach James "Big Jim" Williams, the Rattlers finished the season overall record of 5–6 and a mark of 2–3 in conference play.

== Schedule ==
Date	Opponent	Site	Result	Attendance	Source
September 23	North Carolina A&T*	Bragg Memorial Stadium; Tallahassee, FL	L 20–22	12,000–12,560	
September 30	Western Carolina*	Bragg Memorial Stadium; Tallahassee, FL	W 21–17	11,600	
October 7	at Alabama State	Cramton Bowl; Montgomery, AL	L 8–13	7,806	
October 14	at Morris Brown	Atlanta Stadium; Atlanta, GA	W 42–14	15,000	
October 21	No. 8 Tennessee State*	Bragg Memorial Stadium; Tallahassee, FL	L 25–44	16,500	
October 28	Tuskegee^{†}	Bragg Memorial Stadium; Tallahassee, FL	L 6–17	16,600	
November 4	at Tampa*	Tampa Stadium; Tampa, FL	L 9–28	31,350	
November 11	at Southern*	University Stadium; Baton Rouge, LA	W 27–13	9,503	
November 18	at Bethune–Cookman	Memorial Stadium; Daytona Beach, FL (Florida Classic)	W 28–18	6,267	
November 25	at Albany State	Mills Memorial Stadium; Albany, GA	L 6–21	6,846	
December 2	vs. Maryland Eastern Shore*	Miami Orange Bowl; Miami, FL (Orange Blossom Classic)	W 41–21	23,840	
*Non-conference game; ^{†}Homecoming; Rankings from AP Poll released prior to the game; Source:
