= 1972 Western Kentucky Hilltoppers football team =

American college football season

1972 Western Kentucky Hilltoppers football
- Conference: Ohio Valley Conference
- Record: 7–3 (5–2 OVC)
- Head coach: Jimmy Feix (5th season)
- Home stadium: L. T. Smith Stadium

1972 Ohio Valley Conference football standings
	Conf.					Overall
Team	W		L		T	W		L		T
No. 8 Tennessee Tech $	7	–	0	–	0	10	–	2	–	0
Western Kentucky	5	–	2	–	0	7	–	3	–	0
Middle Tennessee	4	–	2	–	1	7	–	3	–	1
Morehead State	3	–	3	–	1	3	–	6	–	1
Eastern Kentucky	3	–	4	–	0	5	–	6	–	0
Murray State	2	–	5	–	0	4	–	6	–	0
East Tennessee State	2	–	5	–	0	3	–	7	–	0
Austin Peay	1	–	6	–	0	3	–	8	–	0
$ – Conference champion; Rankings from UPI small college poll

The 1972 Western Kentucky football team represented Western Kentucky University during the 1972 NCAA College Division football season. The team was led by head coach Jimmy Feix and finished second in the Ohio Valley Conference (OVC)after winning the conference championship the previous two years. The team roster included future National Football League (NFL) players Virgil Livers, John Bushong, Clarence "Jazz" Jackson, Brad Watson, and Mike McCoy. Andrew Francis, Jackson, McCoy, and Watson were selected to the All-OVC team. The coaching staff included future NFL coach Romeo Crennel.

== Schedule ==
Date	Opponent	Rank	Site	Result	Attendance	Source
September 9	Appalachian State*	No. 12	L. T. Smith Stadium; Bowling Green, KY	L 6–7	15,200	
September 16	at Wittenberg*		Springfield, OH	W 19–7	3,000	
September 23	Austin Peay		L. T. Smith Stadium; Bowling Green, KY	W 28–7	12,500	
September 30	East Tennessee State		Memorial Stadium; Johnson City, TN	W 17–7	6,932	
October 14	at Tennessee Tech		Tucker Stadium; Cookeville, TN	L 10–30	12,000	
October 21	Eastern Kentucky		L. T. Smith Stadium; Bowling Green, KY (Battle of the Bluegrass)	W 10–0	15,400	
October 28	at Morehead State		Jayne Stadium; Morehead, KY	W 35–6	6,000	
November 4	Middle Tennessee^{†}		L. T. Smith Stadium; Bowling Green, KY (100 Miles of Hate)	L 17–21	20,000	
November 11	Butler*		L. T. Smith Stadium; Bowling Green, KY	W 35–6	10,400	
November 18	at Murray State		Cutchin Stadium; Murray, KY (Battle for the Red Belt)	W 17–6	6,000	
*Non-conference game; ^{†}Homecoming; Rankings from UPI Poll released prior to the game
