= 1972 Middle Tennessee Blue Raiders football team =

American college football season

1972 Middle Tennessee Blue Raiders football
- Conference: Ohio Valley Conference
- Record: 7–3–1 (4–2–1 OVC)
- Head coach: Bill Peck (3rd season)
- Captains: C. Holt; Greg Gregory
- Home stadium: Horace Jones Field

1972 Ohio Valley Conference football standings
	Conf.					Overall
Team	W		L		T	W		L		T
No. 8 Tennessee Tech $	7	–	0	–	0	10	–	2	–	0
Western Kentucky	5	–	2	–	0	7	–	3	–	0
Middle Tennessee	4	–	2	–	1	7	–	3	–	1
Morehead State	3	–	3	–	1	3	–	6	–	1
Eastern Kentucky	3	–	4	–	0	5	–	6	–	0
Murray State	2	–	5	–	0	4	–	6	–	0
East Tennessee State	2	–	5	–	0	3	–	7	–	0
Austin Peay	1	–	6	–	0	3	–	8	–	0
$ – Conference champion; Rankings from UPI small college poll

The 1972 Middle Tennessee Blue Raiders football team represented Middle Tennessee State University—as a member of the Ohio Valley Conference (OVC) during the 1972 NCAA College Division football season. Led by third-year head coach Bill Peck, the Blue Raiders compiled a record an overall record of 7–3–1 with a mark of 4–2–1 in conference play, placing third in the OVC. The team's captains were C. Holt and Greg Gregory.

== Schedule ==
Date	Opponent	Site	Result	Attendance	Source
September 9	Florence State*	Horace Jones Field; Murfreesboro, TN	W 31–10	10,000	
September 16	Tennessee–Martin*	Horace Jones Field; Murfreesboro, TN	W 30–3	9,000	
September 23	Morehead State	Horace Jones Field; Murfreesboro, TN	T 35–35	6,500	
September 30	at Chattanooga*	Chamberlain Field; Chattanooga, TN	W 17–13	9,000	
October 7	at Eastern Kentucky	Richmond, KY	L 0–13	14,750	
October 14	at Murray State	Cutchin Stadium; Murray, KY	W 14–13	5,000	
October 21	Austin Peay	Horace Jones Field; Murfreesboro, TN	W 24–6	12,000	
October 28	at Ball State*	Ball State Stadium; Muncie, IN	L 0–24	8,725	
November 4	at Western Kentucky	L. T. Smith Stadium; Bowling Green, KY (rivalry)	W 21–17	20,000	
November 11	East Tennessee State	Horace Jones Field; Murfreesboro, TN	W 34–24	6,500	
November 18	at Tennessee Tech	Tucker Stadium; Cookeville, TN	L 10–24	13,100	
*Non-conference game
