= 1972 South Dakota Coyotes football team =

American college football season

1972 South Dakota Coyotes football

NCC co-champion
- Conference: North Central Conference
- Record: 9–1 (6–1 NCC)
- Head coach: Joe Salem (7th season)
- Home stadium: Inman Field

1972 North Central Conference football standings
	Conf.					Overall
Team	W		L		T	W		L		T
No. T–6 North Dakota +	6	–	1	–	0	10	–	1	–	0
No. T–6 South Dakota +	6	–	1	–	0	9	–	1	–	0
North Dakota State +	6	–	1	–	0	8	–	2	–	0
Mankato State	3	–	4	–	0	6	–	5	–	0
Northern Iowa	3	–	4	–	0	4	–	5	–	0
South Dakota State	2	–	5	–	0	6	–	5	–	0
Morningside	1	–	6	–	0	2	–	8	–	0
Augustana (SD)	1	–	6	–	0	2	–	8	–	0
+ – Conference co-champions; Rankings from AP small college poll

The 1972 South Dakota Coyotes football team was an American football team that represented the University of South Dakota in the North Central Conference (NCC) during the 1972 NCAA College Division football season. In its seventh season under head coach Joe Salem, the team compiled a 9–1 record (6–1 against NCC opponents), tied for the NCC championship, and outscored opponents by a total of 296 to 144. The team played its home games at Inman Field in Vermillion, South Dakota.

== Schedule ==
Date	Time	Opponent	Rank	Site	Result	Attendance	Source
September 9		Montana*		Inman Field; Vermillion, SD	W 35–0	6,000–9,000	
September 16		at Idaho State*		ASISU Minidome; Pocatello, ID	W 35–7	9,000	
September 23		at No. 2 North Dakota	No. 9	Memorial Stadium; Grand Forks, ND (Sitting Bull Trophy)	L 3–33	10,000	
September 30		Northern Iowa		Inman Field; Vermillion, SD	W 21–7	9,600–9,660	
October 7	1:30 p.m.	No. 5 Drake*		Inman Field; Vermillion, SD	W 28–23	8,000	
October 14		at Morningside		Sioux City, IA	W 41–6	6,500	
October 21		South Dakota State		Inman Field; Vermillion, SD (rivalry)	W 42–27	11,500	
October 28		at Augustana (SD)		Howard Wood Field; Sioux Falls, SD	W 21–14	7,500	
November 4		No. 6 North Dakota State		Inman Field; Vermillion, SD	W 35–21	10,001	
November 11		at Mankato State	No. 5	Blakeslee Stadium; Mankato, MN	W 35–6	3,600	
*Non-conference game; Rankings from AP Poll released prior to the game; All times are in Central time
