= 1972 Monmouth Fighting Scots football team =

American college football season

1972 Monmouth Fighting Scots football

MWC champion
- Conference: Midwest Conference
- Record: 9–0 (8–0 MWC)
- Head coach: Bill Reichow (7th season)
- Home stadium: Chuck Goehl, Steve Rueckert, Dave Brinker

1972 Midwest Conference football standings
| | Conf. | | | | | Overall |
| Team | W | | L | | T | W | | L | | T |
|---|---|---|---|---|---|---|---|---|---|---|
| Monmouth (IL) $ | 8 | – | 0 | – | 0 | 9 | – | 0 | – | 0 |
| Cornell (IA) | 6 | – | 2 | – | 0 | 6 | – | 3 | – | 0 |
| Knox | 5 | – | 3 | – | 0 | 6 | – | 3 | – | 0 |
| St. Olaf | 5 | – | 3 | – | 0 | 6 | – | 3 | – | 0 |
| Ripon | 5 | – | 3 | – | 0 | 5 | – | 3 | – | 0 |
| Coe | 5 | – | 3 | – | 0 | 5 | – | 4 | – | 0 |
| Carleton | 3 | – | 5 | – | 0 | 3 | – | 5 | – | 0 |
| Lawrence | 1 | – | 6 | – | 1 | 1 | – | 6 | – | 1 |
| Grinnell | 1 | – | 7 | – | 0 | 2 | – | 7 | – | 0 |
| Beloit | 0 | – | 7 | – | 1 | 0 | – | 8 | – | 1 |
$ – Conference champion

The 1972 Monmouth Fighting Scots football team was an American football team that represented Monmouth College of Monmouth, Illinois, as a member of the Midwest Conference (MWC) during the 1972 NCAA College Division football season. In their seventh season under head coach Bill Reichow, the Fighting Scots compiled a perfect 9–0 record (8–0 against MWC opponents), won the MWC championship, and outscored opponents by a total of 328 to 105. It was Monmouth's first perfect season since 1906. At the end of the season, and despite their record, the Scots were not invited to play in the Amos Alonzo Stagg Bowl.

The team gained 532 rushing yards (679 total yards) against Carleton on October 7, 1972. On defense, they gave up only 12 rushing yards (46 total yards) by Carleton. Monmouth's leading rusher in the game was tailback Dennis Plummer with 202 rushing yards. Chuck Goehl caught seven passes for 110 yards in the game.

Plummer was selected as the team's most valuable player. Quarterback Tim Burk led the team with 1,200 yards of total offense and 19 touchdown passes. Seven Monmouth players received first-team honors on the 1973 All-MWC football team: Plummer at running back; Dave Brinker at guard; Steve Ruecker at defensive halfback; Tom Kratochvil at tackle; Grant Minor at center; Steve Pinkus at tackle; and Jim Smith at linebacker.

The team had three captains: Chuck Goehl, Steve Rueckert, and Dave Brinker.

== Schedule ==
| Date | Time | Opponent | Site | Result | Attendance | Source |
|---|---|---|---|---|---|---|
| September 16 | | at Olivet* | Olivet, MI | W 47–18 | | |
| September 23 | | Grinnell | Monmouth, IL | W 63–7 | | |
| September 30 | | at Lawrence | Appleton, WI | W 48–6 | | |
| October 7 | | Carleton | Monmouth, IL | W 47–0 | 4,000 | |
| October 14 | | at Coe | Cedar Rapids, IA | W 16–12 | | |
| October 21 | 1:30 p.m. | at Knox | Knox Bowl; Galesburg, IL (Bronze Gobbler) | W 21–12 | | |
| October 28 | | Cornell (IA) | Monmouth, IL | W 19–13 | | |
| November 4 | | at Ripon | Ripon, WI | W 40–30 | | |
| November 11 | | St. Olaf | Monmouth, IL | W 27–7 | | |
*Non-conference game; All times are in Central time
