= 1972 Tennessee State Tigers football team =

American college football season

1972 Tennessee State Tigers football

Pioneer Bowl, W 29–7 vs. Drake
- Conference: Independent
- Record: 11–1
- Head coach: John Merritt (10th season)
- Home stadium: Hale Stadium

1972 NCAA College Division independents football records
	Conf.			Overall
Team	W	L	T	W		L		T
No. 4 Ashland		–		11	–	0	–	0
Bridgeport		–		11	–	0	–	0
No. 1 Delaware		–		10	–	0	–	0
No. 5 Tennessee State		–		11	–	1	–	0
Colorado College		–		8	–	1	–	0
Tampa		–		10	–	2	–	0
Trinity (TX)		–		8	–	2	–	0
Western Carolina		–		7	–	2	–	1
Hawaii		–		8	–	3	–	0
Indiana State		–		7	–	3	–	0
Northeastern		–		6	–	2	–	0
Bucknell		–		6	–	3	–	0
Cortland		–		6	–	3	–	0
San Diego		–		6	–	3	–	1
Arkansas–Pine Bluff		–		4	–	2	–	1
Eastern Michigan		–		6	–	4	–	0
Milwaukee		–		6	–	4	–	0
Samford		–		5	–	3	–	2
Ball State		–		5	–	4	–	1
Lake Forest		–		4	–	3	–	1
Nevada		–		6	–	5	–	0
Central Michigan		–		5	–	5	–	1
Rose-Hulman		–		5	–	5	–	0
Santa Clara		–		4	–	4	–	1
Akron		–		3	–	4	–	2
St. Norbert		–		4	–	5	–	0
Saint Mary's		–		3	–	4	–	0
Kentucky State		–		4	–	6	–	0
Drexel		–		3	–	6	–	0
Northeast Louisiana		–		3	–	7	–	0
Portland State		–		3	–	8	–	0
Wayne State (MI)		–		2	–	5	–	1
Boston University		–		2	–	8	–	0
Northern Michigan		–		2	–	8	–	0
Saint Peter's		–		2	–	8	–	0
Chattanooga		–		2	–	9	–	0
Southern Illinois		–		1	–	8	–	1
Eastern Illinois		–		1	–	9	–	0
Madison		–		0	–	4	–	1
UNLV		–		1	–	10	–	0
Rankings from AP small college poll

The 1972 Tennessee State Tigers football team represented Tennessee State University as an independent during the 1972 NCAA College Division football season. In their tenth season under head coach John Merritt, the Tigers compiled an 11–1 record, defeated Drake in the Pioneer Bowl (the Midwest region final of the NCAA College Division), and outscored all opponents by a total of 431 to 107.

== Schedule ==
Date	Opponent	Rank	Site	Result	Attendance	Source
September 9	vs. Norfolk State		Memphis Memorial Stadium; Memphis, TN	W 56–6	9,208	
September 15	vs. Morgan State		Atlanta Stadium; Atlanta, GA (Atlanta Gridiron Festival)	W 14–0	10,093	
September 23	vs. Alcorn A&M	No. 4	Soldier Field; Chicago, IL (Urban League Classic)	W 40–13	34,208–48,000	
September 30	Texas Southern	No. 2	Hale Stadium; Nashville, TN	W 38–15	14,224–16,000	
October 7	at Grambling	No. 3	Grambling Stadium; Grambling, LA	L 18–27	9,620–12,035	
October 14	Virginia State	No. 9	Hale Stadium; Nashville, TN	W 49–0	9,000	
October 21	Florida A&M	No. 8	Bragg Memorial Stadium; Tallahassee, FL	W 44–25	16,500	
October 28	Southern	No. 4	Hale Stadium; Nashville, TN	W 35–0	9,200–11,023	
November 4	Morris Brown	No. 4	Hale Stadium; Nashville, TN	W 24–14	15,000	
November 11	at Central State (OH)	No. 4	McPherson Stadium; Wilberforce, OH	W 41–0	8,000	
November 23	at Alabama State	No. 5	Cramton Bowl; Montgomery, AL	W 43–0	15,000	
December 9	vs. Drake	No. 5	Memorial Stadium; Wichita Falls, TX (Pioneer Bowl)	W 29–7	9,200	
Rankings from AP Poll released prior to the game
