= 1972 Mississippi Valley State Delta Devils football team =

American college football season

1972 Mississippi Valley State Delta Devils football
- Conference: Southwestern Athletic Conference
- Record: 5–5 (1–5 SWAC)
- Head coach: Davis Weathersby (3rd season)
- Home stadium: Magnolia Stadium

1972 Southwestern Athletic Conference football standings
	Conf.					Overall
Team	W		L		T	W		L		T
No. 4 / T–8 Grambling +	5	–	1	–	0	11	–	2	–	0
Jackson State +	5	–	1	–	0	8	–	3	–	0
Alcorn A&M	4	–	1	–	1	5	–	3	–	1
Texas Southern	3	–	2	–	1	5	–	4	–	1
Mississippi Valley State	1	–	5	–	0	5	–	5	–	0
Prairie View A&M	1	–	5	–	0	5	–	5	–	0
Southern	1	–	5	–	0	2	–	7	–	1
+ – Conference co-champions; Rankings from NAIA Division I poll and AP small college poll

The 1972 Mississippi Valley State Delta Devils football team represented Mississippi Valley State College (now known as Mississippi Valley State University) as a member of the Southwestern Athletic Conference (SWAC) during the 1972 NCAA College Division football season. Led by third-year head coach Davis Weathersby, the Delta Devils compiled an overall record of 5–5, with a conference record of 1–5, and finished tied for fifth in the SWAC.

== Schedule ==
Date	Opponent	Site	Result	Attendance	Source
September 9	Alabama A&M*	Magnolia Stadium; Itta Bena, MS	W 7–6	9,921	
September 16	at Arkansas AM&N*	Pumphrey Stadium; Pine Bluff, AR	W 7–6	6,300	
September 23	at Federal City*	Washington, DC	W 27–6	1,900	
September 30	vs. Southern	Crump Stadium; Memphis, TN	W 23–13	12,000	
October 7	Miles*	Magnolia Stadium; Itta Bena, MS	W 44–13	10,311	
October 14	vs. Grambling	Arrowhead Stadium; Kansas City, MO	L 21–27	9,381	
October 21	at Texas Southern	Rice Stadium; Houston, TX	L 17–44	11,121	
October 28	at Prairie View A&M	Edward L. Blackshear Field; Prairie View, TX	L 6–9	7,000	
November 4	Alcorn A&M	Magnolia Stadium; Itta Bena, MS	L 13–23	10,288	
November 18	at Jackson State	Mississippi Veterans Memorial Stadium; Jackson, MS	L 6–27	2,312	
*Non-conference game
