= 1972 Prairie View A&M Panthers football team =

American college football season

1972 Prairie View A&M Panthers football
- Conference: Southwestern Athletic Conference
- Record: 5–5 (1–5 SWAC)
- Head coach: Theophilus Danzy (1st season)
- Home stadium: Edward L. Blackshear Field

1972 Southwestern Athletic Conference football standings
	Conf.					Overall
Team	W		L		T	W		L		T
No. 4 / T–8 Grambling +	5	–	1	–	0	11	–	2	–	0
Jackson State +	5	–	1	–	0	8	–	3	–	0
Alcorn A&M	4	–	1	–	1	5	–	3	–	1
Texas Southern	3	–	2	–	1	5	–	4	–	1
Mississippi Valley State	1	–	5	–	0	5	–	5	–	0
Prairie View A&M	1	–	5	–	0	5	–	5	–	0
Southern	1	–	5	–	0	2	–	7	–	1
+ – Conference co-champions; Rankings from NAIA Division I poll and AP small college poll

The 1972 Prairie View A&M Panthers football team represented Prairie View A&M College of Texas (now known as Prairie View A&M University) as a member of the Southwestern Athletic Conference (SWAC) during the 1972 NCAA College Division football season. Led by first-year head coach Theophilus Danzy, the Panthers compiled an overall record of 5–5, with a conference record of 1–5, and finished tied for fourth in the SWAC.

== Schedule ==
Date	Opponent	Site	Result	Attendance	Source
September 9	vs. Cal State Hayward*	Oakland–Alameda County Coliseum; Oakland, CA (Sickle Cell Anemia Football Classic)	W 16–0	10,052	
September 16	at Jackson State	Mississippi Veterans Memorial Stadium; Jackson, MS	L 3–16	7,000	
September 23	at Southern	University Stadium; Baton Rouge, LA	L 7–20		
September 30	vs. Grambling	RFK Stadium; Washington, DC	L 0–36	20,104	
October 7	at Texas Lutheran*	Matador Stadium; Seguin, TX	W 0–2 (forfeit win)		
October 14	vs. Arkansas AM&N*	Farrington Field; Fort Worth, TX	W 7–0		
October 21	at Bishop*	P.C. Cobb Stadium; Dallas, TX	W 14–10		
October 28	Mississippi Valley State	Edward L. Blackshear Field; Prairie View, TX	W 9–6	7,000	
November 11	Alcorn A&M	Edward L. Blackshear Field; Prairie View, TX	L 0–13		
November 23	at Texas Southern	Astrodome; Houston, TX (rivalry)	L 0–13	19,000	
*Non-conference game
