= 1972 North Dakota State Bison football team =

American college football season

1972 North Dakota State Bison football

NCC co-champion
- Conference: North Central Conference
- Record: 8–2 (6–1 NCC)
- Head coach: Ron Erhardt (7th season)
- Home stadium: Dacotah Field

1972 North Central Conference football standings
| | Conf. | | | | | Overall |
| Team | W | | L | | T | W | | L | | T |
|---|---|---|---|---|---|---|---|---|---|---|
| No. T–6 North Dakota + | 6 | – | 1 | – | 0 | 10 | – | 1 | – | 0 |
| No. T–6 South Dakota + | 6 | – | 1 | – | 0 | 9 | – | 1 | – | 0 |
| North Dakota State + | 6 | – | 1 | – | 0 | 8 | – | 2 | – | 0 |
| Mankato State | 3 | – | 4 | – | 0 | 6 | – | 5 | – | 0 |
| Northern Iowa | 3 | – | 4 | – | 0 | 4 | – | 5 | – | 0 |
| South Dakota State | 2 | – | 5 | – | 0 | 6 | – | 5 | – | 0 |
| Morningside | 1 | – | 6 | – | 0 | 2 | – | 8 | – | 0 |
| Augustana (SD) | 1 | – | 6 | – | 0 | 2 | – | 8 | – | 0 |
+ – Conference co-champions; Rankings from AP small college poll

The 1972 North Dakota State Bison football team was an American football team that represented North Dakota State University during the 1972 NCAA College Division football season as a member of the North Central Conference. In their seventh year under head coach Ron Erhardt, the team compiled a 8–2 record.

== Schedule ==
| Date | Opponent | Rank | Site | Result | Attendance | Source |
|---|---|---|---|---|---|---|
| September 2 | Mankato State | | Dacotah Field; Fargo, ND | W 21–17 | 7,800 | |
| September 9 | at Northern Arizona* | | Lumberjack Stadium; Flagstaff, AZ | W 14–7 | 7,963 | |
| September 16 | at Montana State* | | Memorial Stadium; Great Falls, MT | L 24–27 | 5,500–6,500 | |
| September 23 | Youngstown State* | | Dacotah Field; Fargo, ND | W 16–10 | 8,300 | |
| September 30 | Morningside | | Dacotah Field; Fargo, ND | W 48–6 | 9,100 | |
| October 7 | at Northern Iowa | | O. R. Latham Stadium; Cedar Falls, IA | W 42–0 | 7,300–7,364 | |
| October 14 | Augustana (SD)^{†} | | Dacotah Field; Fargo, ND | W 40–24 | 9,700 | |
| October 21 | at No. 3 North Dakota | | Memorial Stadium; Grand Forks, ND (Nickel Trophy) | W 22–17 | 13,500 | |
| October 28 | South Dakota State | No. 6 | Dacotah Field; Fargo, ND (rivalry) | W 34–16 | 6,100–6,500 | |
| November 4 | at South Dakota | No. 6 | Inman Field; Vermillion, SD | L 21–35 | 10,001 | |
*Non-conference game; ^{†}Homecoming; Rankings from AP Poll released prior to the game
