= 1972 North Dakota Fighting Sioux football team =

American college football season

1972 North Dakota Fighting Sioux football

NCC co-champion

Camellia Bowl, W 38–21 vs. Cal Poly
- Conference: North Central Conference
- Record: 10–1 (6–1 NCC)
- Head coach: Jerry Olson (5th season)
- Home stadium: Memorial Stadium

1972 North Central Conference football standings
	Conf.					Overall
Team	W		L		T	W		L		T
No. T–6 North Dakota +	6	–	1	–	0	10	–	1	–	0
No. T–6 South Dakota +	6	–	1	–	0	9	–	1	–	0
North Dakota State +	6	–	1	–	0	8	–	2	–	0
Mankato State	3	–	4	–	0	6	–	5	–	0
Northern Iowa	3	–	4	–	0	4	–	5	–	0
South Dakota State	2	–	5	–	0	6	–	5	–	0
Morningside	1	–	6	–	0	2	–	8	–	0
Augustana (SD)	1	–	6	–	0	2	–	8	–	0
+ – Conference co-champions; Rankings from AP small college poll

The 1972 North Dakota Fighting Sioux football team, also known as the Nodaks, was an American football team that represented the University of North Dakota in the North Central Conference (NCC) during the 1972 NCAA College Division football season. In its fifth year under head coach Jerry Olson, the team compiled a 10–1 record (6–1 against NCC opponents), tied for the NCC championship, defeated Cal Poly in the Camellia Bowl, and outscored opponents by a total of 423 to 161. The team played its home games at Memorial Stadium in Grand Forks, North Dakota.

== Schedule ==
Date	Time	Opponent	Rank	Site	Result	Attendance	Source
September 9		Montana State*		Memorial Stadium; Grand Forks, ND	W 42–28	7,500	
September 16	9:00 p.m.	vs. Montana*		Daylis Stadium; Billings, MT	W 42–14	6,000–7,000	
September 23		No. 9 South Dakota	No. 2	Memorial Stadium; Grand Forks, ND (Sitting Bull Trophy)	W 33–3	10,000	
September 30		at Augustana (SD)	No. 4	Howard Wood Field; Sioux Falls, SD	W 28–16	5,000	
October 7		at Morningside	No. 4	Sioux City, IA	W 69–0	1,000	
October 14		at South Dakota State	No. 3	Coughlin–Alumni Stadium; Brookings, SD	W 51–21	11,000	
October 21		North Dakota State	No. 3	Memorial Stadium; Grand Forks, ND (Nickel Trophy)	L 17–22	14,000	
October 28		Northern Iowa	No. 8	Memorial Stadium; Grand Forks, ND	W 38–9	3,506–4,000	
November 4		Mankato State	No. 8	Memorial Stadium; Grand Forks, ND	W 48–14	3,500	
November 11		at UNLV*	No. 7	Las Vegas Stadium; Whitney, NV	W 17–13	3,200–3,298	
December 9		vs. No. 3 Cal Poly*	No. T–6	Hornet Stadium; Sacramento, CA (Camellia Bowl)	W 38–21		
*Non-conference game; Rankings from AP Poll released prior to the game; All times are in Central time
