= 1972 Southern Jaguars football team =

American college football season

1972 Southern Jaguars football
- Conference: Southwestern Athletic Conference
- Record: 2–8–1 (1–5 SWAC)
- Head coach: Charles Bates (1st season)
- Home stadium: University Stadium

1972 Southwestern Athletic Conference football standings
	Conf.					Overall
Team	W		L		T	W		L		T
No. 4 / T–8 Grambling +	5	–	1	–	0	11	–	2	–	0
Jackson State +	5	–	1	–	0	8	–	3	–	0
Alcorn A&M	4	–	1	–	1	5	–	3	–	1
Texas Southern	3	–	2	–	1	5	–	4	–	1
Mississippi Valley State	1	–	5	–	0	5	–	5	–	0
Prairie View A&M	1	–	5	–	0	5	–	5	–	0
Southern	1	–	5	–	0	2	–	7	–	1
+ – Conference co-champions; Rankings from NAIA Division I poll and AP small college poll

The 1972 Southern Jaguars football team represented Southern University as a member of the Southwestern Athletic Conference (SWAC) during the 1972 NCAA College Division football season. Led by first-year head coach Charles Bates, the Jaguars compiled an overall record of 2–8–1, with a conference record of 1–5, and finished tied for fifth in the SWAC.

The Jaguars forfeited their final two games of the season after the November 16 campus riot which saw two students shot to death.

== Schedule ==
Date	Opponent	Site	Result	Attendance	Source
September 9	at Tuskegee*	Cramton Bowl; Montgomery, AL	W 24–19	17,791	
September 16	at Texas Southern	Rice Stadium; Houston, TX	L 0–37	32,585	
September 23	Prairie View A&M	University Stadium; Baton Rouge, LA	W 20–7	20,505	
September 30	vs. Mississippi Valley State	Crump Stadium; Memphis, TN	L 13–23	12,000	
October 7	at Arkansas–Pine Bluff*	Pumphrey Stadium; Pine Bluff, AR	T 7–7	1,367	
October 14	Jackson State	University Stadium; Baton Rouge, LA (rivalry)	L 17–22	33,511	
October 21	at Alcorn A&M	Henderson Stadium; Lorman, MS	L 3–40	7,000	
October 28	at No. 4 Tennessee State*	Hale Stadium; Nashville, TN	L 0–35	9,200–11,023	
November 11	Florida A&M*	University Stadium; Baton Rouge, LA	L 13–27	9,503	
November 18	No. 8 Grambling	University Stadium; Baton Rouge, LA (rivalry)	L 0–0 (forfeit loss)		
November 25	vs. Santa Clara*	Candlestick Park; San Francisco, CA (Bay Area Football Classic)	L 0–0 (forfeit loss)		
*Non-conference game; Rankings from AP Poll released prior to the game
