= 1972 Delaware State Hornets football team =

American college football season

1972 Delaware State Hornets football
- Conference: Mid-Eastern Athletic Conference
- Record: 5–4 (2–4 MEAC)
- Head coach: Arnold Jeter (6th season)
- Home stadium: Alumni Stadium

1972 Mid-Eastern Athletic Conference football standings
	Conf.					Overall
Team	W		L		T	W		L		T
No. 10 North Carolina Central $	5	–	1	–	0	9	–	2	–	0
No. 13 North Carolina A&T	4	–	2	–	0	8	–	2	–	0
Morgan State	4	–	2	–	0	5	–	5	–	0
Maryland Eastern Shore	4	–	2	–	0	4	–	5	–	0
Howard	2	–	4	–	0	6	–	4	–	0
Delaware State	2	–	4	–	0	5	–	4	–	0
South Carolina State	0	–	6	–	0	1	–	9	–	0
$ – Conference champion; Rankings from NAIA Division I poll

The 1972 Delaware State Hornets football team represented Delaware State College—now known as Delaware State University—as a member of the Mid-Eastern Athletic Conference (MEAC) in the 1972 NCAA College Division football season. Led by sixth-year head coach Arnold Jeter, the Hornets compiled an overall record of 5–4 and a mark of 2–4 in conference play, trying for fifth in the MEAC.

== Schedule ==
Date	Opponent	Site	Result	Attendance	Source
September 16	at C. W. Post*	Brookville, NY	W 27–7		
September 23	at Millersville*	Millersville, PA	W 28–21		
October 7	at Howard	Howard Stadium; Washington, DC	L 0–10	7,000	
October 14	North Carolina Central	Alumni Stadium; Dover, DE	W 14–10	10,000	
October 21	at Morgan State	Hughes Stadium; Baltimore, MD	L 7–42	4,000	
October 28	Maryland Eastern Shore	Alumni Stadium; Dover, DE	L 0–19		
November 4	Hofstra*	Alumni Stadium; Dover, DE	W 26–7		
November 11	at North Carolina A&T	World War Memorial Stadium; Greensboro, NC	L 7–13	7,300	
November 18	South Carolina State	Alumni Stadium; Dover, DE	W 29–21	4,600	
*Non-conference game
