= 1972 Maryland Eastern Shore Hawks football team =

American college football season

1972 Maryland Eastern Shore Hawks football
- Conference: Mid-Eastern Athletic Conference
- Record: 4–5 (4–2 MEAC)
- Head coach: Willie Smith (2nd season)

1972 Mid-Eastern Athletic Conference football standings
	Conf.					Overall
Team	W		L		T	W		L		T
No. 10 North Carolina Central $	5	–	1	–	0	9	–	2	–	0
No. 13 North Carolina A&T	4	–	2	–	0	8	–	2	–	0
Morgan State	4	–	2	–	0	5	–	5	–	0
Maryland Eastern Shore	4	–	2	–	0	4	–	5	–	0
Howard	2	–	4	–	0	6	–	4	–	0
Delaware State	2	–	4	–	0	5	–	4	–	0
South Carolina State	0	–	6	–	0	1	–	9	–	0
$ – Conference champion; Rankings from NAIA Division I poll

The 1972 Maryland Eastern Shore Hawks football team represented the University of Maryland Eastern Shore as a member of the Mid-Eastern Athletic Conference (MEAC) during the 1972 NCAA College Division football season. Led by second-year head coach Willie Smith, the Hawks compiled an overall record of 4–5, with a mark of 4–2 in conference play, and finished tied for second in the MEAC.

== Schedule ==
Date	Opponent	Site	Result	Attendance	Source
September 16	Howard	Princess Anne, MD	W 20–8	1,100	
September 23	at Kentucky State*	Alumni Field; Frankfort, KY	L 0–21	2,700	
October 7	Morgan State	Princess Anne, MD	L 13–16	2,000	
October 14	North Carolina A&T	Princess Anne, MD	W 23–14	3,150	
October 21	at North Carolina Central	Durham County Memorial Stadium; Durham, NC	L 20–42	16,000	
October 28	at Delaware State	Alumni Stadium; Dover, DE	W 19–0		
November 4	at South Carolina State	State College Stadium; Orangeburg, SC	W 17–11	11,000	
November 18	Virginia State*	Princess Anne, MD	L 0–6		
December 2	vs. Florida A&M*	Miami Orange Bowl; Miami, FL (Orange Blossom Classic)	L 21–41	23,840	
*Non-conference game
