= 1972 Grambling Tigers football team =

American college football season

1972 Grambling Tigers football

Black national champion SWAC co-champion

Pelican Bowl, W 56–6 vs. North Carolina Central
- Conference: Southwestern Athletic Conference

Ranking
- AP: No. T-8
- Record: 11–2 (5–1 SWAC)
- Head coach: Eddie Robinson (30th season)
- Home stadium: Grambling Stadium

1972 Southwestern Athletic Conference football standings
	Conf.					Overall
Team	W		L		T	W		L		T
No. 4 / T–8 Grambling +	5	–	1	–	0	11	–	2	–	0
Jackson State +	5	–	1	–	0	8	–	3	–	0
Alcorn A&M	4	–	1	–	1	5	–	3	–	1
Texas Southern	3	–	2	–	1	5	–	4	–	1
Mississippi Valley State	1	–	5	–	0	5	–	5	–	0
Prairie View A&M	1	–	5	–	0	5	–	5	–	0
Southern	1	–	5	–	0	2	–	7	–	1
+ – Conference co-champions; Rankings from NAIA Division I poll and AP small college poll

The 1972 Grambling Tigers football team represented Grambling College (now known as Grambling State University) as a member of the Southwestern Athletic Conference (SWAC) during the 1972 NCAA College Division football season. In its 30th season under head coach Eddie Robinson, Grambling compiled an 11–2 record (5–1 against conference opponents), tied for the SWAC championship, defeated North Carolina Central in the Pelican Bowl, and outscored opponents by a total of 346 to 123. The team was recognized as the 1972 black college football national champion and was ranked No. 8 by the Associated Press in the final small college rankings.

The rivalry game vs. Southern was forfeited by the Jaguars to Grambling following civil unrest, which saw two students shot to death by East Baton Rouge Parish sheriff's deputies, on the Southern campus in Baton Rouge two days prior to the scheduled game.

== Schedule ==
Date	Time	Opponent	Rank	Site	Result	Attendance	Source
September 9		vs. Morgan State*		Yankee Stadium; Bronx, NY (Whitney M. Young Memorial Classic)	W 6–0	63,517–64,409	
September 16		Alcorn A&M		Grambling Stadium; Grambling, LA	L 6–9	7,000–14,202	
September 22	10:30 p.m.	at Long Beach State*		Los Angeles Memorial Coliseum; Los Angeles, CA (Freedom Classic)	L 19–25	42,058	
September 30		vs. Prairie View A&M		Robert F. Kennedy Memorial Stadium; Washington, DC	W 36–0	20,109–20,414	
October 7		No. 3 Tennessee State*		Grambling Stadium; Grambling, LA	W 27–18	12,035	
October 14		vs. Mississippi Valley State		Arrowhead Stadium; Kansas City, MO	W 27–21	9,381–9,831	
October 21		Jackson State^{†}		Grambling Stadium; Grambling, LA	W 26–13	22,000	
October 28		at Texas Southern		Astrodome; Houston, TX	W 21–15	52,745	
November 4		at Hawaii*	No. 9	Honolulu Stadium; Honolulu, HI	W 46–7	23,003	
November 11		Norfolk State*	No. 8	Grambling Stadium; Grambling, LA	W 39–6	3,853	
November 18		at Southern	No. 8	University Stadium; Baton Rouge, LA (rivalry)	W 0–0 (forfeit)		
November 25		Nevada*	No. 8	Grambling Stadium; Grambling, LA	W 37–3	14,000	
December 2		at North Carolina Central*	No. 8	Wallace Wade Stadium; Durham, NC (Pelican Bowl)	W 56–6	22,500	
*Non-conference game; ^{†}Homecoming; Rankings from AP Poll released prior to the game; All times are in Central time
