= 1972 Texas Southern Tigers football team =

American college football season

1972 Texas Southern Tigers football
- Conference: Southwestern Athletic Conference
- Record: 5–4–1 (3–2–1 SWAC)
- Head coach: Rod Paige (2nd season)
- Home stadium: Astrodome; Jeppesen Stadium; Rice Stadium

1972 Southwestern Athletic Conference football standings
	Conf.					Overall
Team	W		L		T	W		L		T
No. 4 / T–8 Grambling +	5	–	1	–	0	11	–	2	–	0
Jackson State +	5	–	1	–	0	8	–	3	–	0
Alcorn A&M	4	–	1	–	1	5	–	3	–	1
Texas Southern	3	–	2	–	1	5	–	4	–	1
Mississippi Valley State	1	–	5	–	0	5	–	5	–	0
Prairie View A&M	1	–	5	–	0	5	–	5	–	0
Southern	1	–	5	–	0	2	–	7	–	1
+ – Conference co-champions; Rankings from NAIA Division I poll and AP small college poll

The 1972 Texas Southern Tigers football team was an American football team that represented Texas Southern University as a member of the Southwestern Athletic Conference (SWAC) during the 1972 NCAA College Division football season. Led by second-year head coach Rod Paige, the Tigers compiled an overall record of 5–4–1, with a mark of 3–2–1 in conference play, and finished fourth in the SWAC.

== Schedule ==
Date	Opponent	Site	Result	Attendance	Source
September 9	Texas A&I*	Astrodome; Houston, TX	W 24–16	17,960	
September 16	Southern	Rice Stadium; Houston, TX	W 37–0	32,585	
September 30	at Tennessee State*	Hale Stadium; Nashville, TN	L 15–38	14,224–16,000	
October 7	at Alcorn A&M	Henderson Stadium; Lorman, MS	T 7–7	6,318–9,000	
October 14	Bishop*	Jeppesen Stadium; Houston, TX	W 32–23	12,000	
October 21	Mississippi Valley State	Rice Stadium; Houston, TX	W 44–17	11,000	
October 28	Grambling	Astrodome; Houston, TX	L 15–21	52,745	
November 4	at Jackson State	Mississippi Veterans Memorial Stadium; Jackson, MS	L 7–29	36,000	
November 11	at Langston*	Langston, OK	L 21–26	3,200	
November 23	Prairie View A&M	Astrodome; Houston, TX (rivalry)	W 13–0	19,000	
*Non-conference game
