= 1972 Wisconsin–Whitewater Warhawks football team =

American college football season

1972 Wisconsin–Whitewater Warhawks football
- Conference: Wisconsin State University Conference
- Record: 7–3 (6–2 WSUC)
- Head coach: Forrest Perkins (17th season)
- Home stadium: Warhawks Stadium

1972 Wisconsin State University Conference football standings
| | Conf. | | | | | Overall |
| Team | W | | L | | T | W | | L | | T |
|---|---|---|---|---|---|---|---|---|---|---|
| Wisconsin–Oshkosh $ | 8 | – | 0 | – | 0 | 8 | – | 2 | – | 0 |
| No. T–16 Wisconsin–La Crosse | 7 | – | 1 | – | 0 | 8 | – | 2 | – | 0 |
| Wisconsin–Whitewater | 6 | – | 2 | – | 0 | 7 | – | 3 | – | 0 |
| Wisconsin–Platteville | 4 | – | 4 | – | 0 | 6 | – | 4 | – | 0 |
| Wisconsin–River Falls | 4 | – | 4 | – | 0 | 4 | – | 6 | – | 0 |
| Wisconsin–Eau Claire | 2 | – | 6 | – | 0 | 3 | – | 7 | – | 0 |
| Wisconsin–Stevens Point | 2 | – | 6 | – | 0 | 2 | – | 8 | – | 0 |
| Wisconsin–Stout | 2 | – | 6 | – | 0 | 2 | – | 8 | – | 0 |
| Wisconsin–Superior | 1 | – | 7 | – | 0 | 1 | – | 9 | – | 0 |
$ – Conference champion; Rankings from NAIA Division I poll

The 1972 Wisconsin–Whitewater Warhawks football team was an American football team that represented the University of Wisconsin–Whitewater as a member of the Wisconsin State University Conference (WSUC) during the 1972 NAIA Division I football season. Led by 17th-year head coach Forrest Perkins, the Warhawks compiled an overall record of 7–3 and a mark of 6–2 in conference play, placing third in the WSUC.

== Schedule ==
| Date | Opponent | Site | Result | Source |
|---|---|---|---|---|
| September 9 | Northern Michigan* | Warhawks Stadium; Whitewater, WI | L 14–24 | |
| September 16 | Wisconsin–La Crosse | Warhawks Stadium; Whitewater, WI | L 3–9 | |
| September 23 | at Wisconsin–Stout | Menomonie, WI | W 56–0 | |
| September 30 | at Wisconsin–Platteville | Platteville, WI | W 28–0 | |
| October 7 | at Wisconsin–Superior | Warhawks Stadium; Whitewater, WI | W 51–7 | |
| October 14 | at St. Norbert* | De Pere, WI | W 30–2 | |
| October 21 | Wisconsin–Stevens Point | Warhawks Stadium; Whitewater, WI | W 35–15 | |
| October 28 | at Wisconsin–Eau Claire | Eau Claire, WI | W 27–7 | |
| November 4 | Wisconsin–River Falls | Warhawks Stadium; Whitewater, WI | W 28–0 | |
| November 11 | at Wisconsin–Oshkosh | Titan Stadium; Oshkosh, WI | L 7–10 | |
*Non-conference game
