= 1972 Morgan State Bears football team =

American college football season

1972 Morgan State Bears football
- Conference: Mid-Eastern Athletic Conference
- Record: 5–5 (4–2 MEAC)
- Head coach: Earl Banks (13th season)
- Home stadium: Hughes Stadium; Baltimore Memorial Stadium

1972 Mid-Eastern Athletic Conference football standings
	Conf.					Overall
Team	W		L		T	W		L		T
No. 10 North Carolina Central $	5	–	1	–	0	9	–	2	–	0
No. 13 North Carolina A&T	4	–	2	–	0	8	–	2	–	0
Morgan State	4	–	2	–	0	5	–	5	–	0
Maryland Eastern Shore	4	–	2	–	0	4	–	5	–	0
Howard	2	–	4	–	0	6	–	4	–	0
Delaware State	2	–	4	–	0	5	–	4	–	0
South Carolina State	0	–	6	–	0	1	–	9	–	0
$ – Conference champion; Rankings from NAIA Division I poll

The 1972 Morgan State Bears football team represented Morgan State College (now known as Morgan State University) as a member of the Mid-Eastern Athletic Conference (MEAC) during the 1972 NCAA College Division football season. Led by 13th-year head coach Earl Banks, the Bears compiled an overall record of 5–5 and a mark of 4–2 in conference play, and finished tied for second in the MEAC.

== Schedule ==
Date	Opponent	Site	Result	Attendance	Source
September 9	vs. Grambling*	Yankee Stadium; Bronx, NY (Whitney Young Memorial Classic)	L 0–6	63,517–64,409	
September 15	vs. Tennessee State*	Atlanta Stadium; Atlanta, GA (Atlanta Gridiron Festival)	L 0–14	10,093	
September 30	North Carolina Central	Hughes Stadium; Baltimore, MD	L 7–29	5,117–7,000	
October 7	at Maryland Eastern Shore	Princess Anne, MD	W 16–13	2,000	
October 14	South Carolina State	Hughes Stadium; Baltimore, MD	W 24–21	3,000–3,011	
October 21	Delaware State	Hughes Stadium; Baltimore, MD	W 42–7	4,000	
October 28	at North Carolina A&T	World War Memorial Stadium; Greensboro, NC	L 13–16	17,000–18,752	
November 4	Howard^{†}	Baltimore Memorial Stadium; Baltimore, MD (rivalry)	W 35–13	15,102–15,300	
November 11	at Virginia State*	Rogers Stadium; Ettrick, VA	W 14–13	4,101	
November 18	at Rutgers*	Rutgers Stadium; Piscataway, NJ	L 14–37	7,500	
*Non-conference game; ^{†}Homecoming
