= 1972 Jackson State Tigers football team =

American college football season

1972 Jackson State Tigers football

SWAC co-champion
- Conference: Southwestern Athletic Conference
- Record: 8–3 (5–1 SWAC)
- Head coach: Robert Hill (2nd season)
- Home stadium: Mississippi Veterans Memorial Stadium

1972 Southwestern Athletic Conference football standings
	Conf.					Overall
Team	W		L		T	W		L		T
No. 4 / T–8 Grambling +	5	–	1	–	0	11	–	2	–	0
Jackson State +	5	–	1	–	0	8	–	3	–	0
Alcorn A&M	4	–	1	–	1	5	–	3	–	1
Texas Southern	3	–	2	–	1	5	–	4	–	1
Mississippi Valley State	1	–	5	–	0	5	–	5	–	0
Prairie View A&M	1	–	5	–	0	5	–	5	–	0
Southern	1	–	5	–	0	2	–	7	–	1
+ – Conference co-champions; Rankings from NAIA Division I poll and AP small college poll

The 1972 Jackson State Tigers football team represented Jackson State University as a member of the Southwestern Athletic Conference (SWAC) during the 1972 NCAA College Division football season. Led by second-year head coach Robert Hill, the Tigers compiled an overall record of 8–3, with a conference record of 5–1, and finished as SWAC co-champion.

== Schedule ==
Date	Opponent	Site	Result	Attendance	Source
September 16	Prairie View A&M	Mississippi Veterans Memorial Stadium; Jackson, MS	W 16–3	7,000	
September 23	Lane*	Mississippi Veterans Memorial Stadium; Jackson, MS	W 72–0		
September 30	Kentucky State*	Mississippi Veterans Memorial Stadium; Jackson, MS	W 28–14		
October 7	at Bishop*	Texas Stadium; Irving, TX	W 35–10		
October 14	at Southern	University Stadium; Baton Rouge, LA (rivalry)	W 22–17		
October 21	at Grambling	Grambling Stadium; Grambling, LA	L 13–26	22,000	
October 28	vs. Bethune–Cookman*	Tangerine Bowl; Orlando, FL	L 17–22	12,200	
November 4	Texas Southern	Mississippi Veterans Memorial Stadium; Jackson, MS	W 29–7		
November 11	at Morris Brown*	Herndon Stadium; Atlanta, GA	L 14–20		
November 18	Mississippi Valley State	Mississippi Veterans Memorial Stadium; Jackson, MS	W 27–6		
November 23	Alcorn A&M	Mississippi Veterans Memorial Stadium; Jackson, MS (rivalry)	W 28–14	12,816–14,981	
*Non-conference game

== Roster ==
1972 Jackson State Tigers football team roster
Players
Coaches
Offense

Pos.	#	Name	Class
OT	78	Leon Gray	Sr
WR		Bill Houston	Jr
RB	34	Walter Payton	So
RB	35	Rickey Young	So
G	60	Emanuel Zanders	Jr

Defense

Pos.	#	Name	Class
LB	80	Robert Brazile	So
DB	13	Jim Marshall	Jr
DE	66	Don Reese	Jr
LB	69	John Tate	So
DB	45	Roscoe Word	Jr

Special teams

Pos.	#	Name	Class

Head coach

- Robert Hill

Coordinators/assistant coaches

Legend

- (C) Team captain
- (S) Suspended
- (I) Ineligible
- Injured
- Redshirt
