= 1972 Alcorn A&M Braves football team =

American college football season

1972 Alcorn A&M Braves football
- Conference: Southwestern Athletic Conference
- Record: 5–3–1 (4–1–1 SWAC)
- Head coach: Marino Casem (9th season)
- Home stadium: Henderson Stadium

1972 Southwestern Athletic Conference football standings
	Conf.					Overall
Team	W		L		T	W		L		T
No. 4 / T–8 Grambling +	5	–	1	–	0	11	–	2	–	0
Jackson State +	5	–	1	–	0	8	–	3	–	0
Alcorn A&M	4	–	1	–	1	5	–	3	–	1
Texas Southern	3	–	2	–	1	5	–	4	–	1
Mississippi Valley State	1	–	5	–	0	5	–	5	–	0
Prairie View A&M	1	–	5	–	0	5	–	5	–	0
Southern	1	–	5	–	0	2	–	7	–	1
+ – Conference co-champions; Rankings from NAIA Division I poll and AP small college poll

The 1972 Alcorn A&M Braves football team represented Alcorn A&M College (now known as Alcorn State University) as a member of the Southwestern Athletic Conference (SWAC) during the 1972 NCAA College Division football season. Led by ninth-year head coach Marino Casem, the Braves compiled an overall record of 5–3–1, with a conference record of 4–1–1, and finished third in the SWAC.

== Schedule ==
Date	Opponent	Site	Result	Attendance	Source
September 16	at Grambling	Grambling Stadium; Grambling, LA	W 9–6	7,000–14,202	
September 23	vs. Tennessee State*	Soldier Field; Chicago, IL (Urban League Classic)	L 13–40	34,208–48,000	
October 7	Texas Southern	Henderson Stadium; Lorman, MS	T 7–7	6,318–9,000	
October 14	at Lincoln (MO)*	Jefferson City, MO	L 14–20	3,500	
October 21	Southern	Henderson Stadium; Lorman, MS	W 40–3	8,188	
October 28	at Bishop*	P.C. Cobb Stadium; Dallas, TX	W 34–0	2,619	
November 4	at Mississippi Valley State	Magnolia Stadium; Itta Bena, MS	W 23–13	4,552	
November 11	at Prairie View A&M	Edward L. Blackshear Field; Prairie View, TX	W 13–0	2,891	
November 23	at Jackson State	Mississippi Veterans Memorial Stadium; Jackson, MS (rivalry)	L 14–28	12,816–14,981	
*Non-conference game
