= 1972 South Carolina State Bulldogs football team =

American college football season

1972 South Carolina State Bulldogs football
- Conference: Mid-Eastern Athletic Conference
- Record: 1–9 (0–6 MEAC)
- Head coach: Oree Banks (8th season)
- Home stadium: State College Stadium

1972 Mid-Eastern Athletic Conference football standings
	Conf.					Overall
Team	W		L		T	W		L		T
No. 10 North Carolina Central $	5	–	1	–	0	9	–	2	–	0
No. 13 North Carolina A&T	4	–	2	–	0	8	–	2	–	0
Morgan State	4	–	2	–	0	5	–	5	–	0
Maryland Eastern Shore	4	–	2	–	0	4	–	5	–	0
Howard	2	–	4	–	0	6	–	4	–	0
Delaware State	2	–	4	–	0	5	–	4	–	0
South Carolina State	0	–	6	–	0	1	–	9	–	0
$ – Conference champion; Rankings from NAIA Division I poll

The 1972 South Carolina State Bulldogs football team represented South Carolina State College (now known as South Carolina State University) as a member of the Mid-Eastern Athletic Conference (MEAC) during the 1972 NCAA College Division football season. Led by eighth-year head coach Oree Banks, the Bulldogs compiled an overall record of 1–9, with a mark of 0–6 in conference play, and finished last in the MEAC.

== Schedule ==
Date	Opponent	Site	Result	Attendance	Source
September 9	Bethune–Cookman*	State College Stadium; Orangeburg, SC	W 15–14	8,150	
September 16	at North Carolina A&T	World War Memorial Stadium; Greensboro, NC (rivalry)	L 7–41	7,125–9,050	
September 23	at Howard	Howard Stadium; Washington, DC	L 0–10	7,000–8,750	
September 30	Virginia Union*	State College Stadium; Orangeburg, SC	L 6–13	7,984	
October 14	at Morgan State	Hughes Stadium; Baltimore, MD	L 21–24	3,000–3,011	
October 21	Kentucky State*	State College Stadium; Orangeburg, SC	L 13–27	8,470	
October 28	North Carolina Central	State College Stadium; Orangeburg, SC	L 0–43	7,429–9,000	
November 4	Maryland Eastern Shore	State College Stadium; Orangeburg, SC	L 11–17	11,000	
November 11	at Alabama A&M*	Milton Frank Stadium; Huntsville, AL	L 6–42	4,621	
November 18	at Delaware State	Alumni Stadium; Dover, DE	L 21–29	4,600	
*Non-conference game
