= 1972 Howard Bison football team =

American college football season

1972 Howard Bison football
- Conference: Mid-Eastern Athletic Conference
- Record: 6–4 (2–4 MEAC)
- Head coach: Tillman Sease (10th season)
- Home stadium: Howard Stadium; RFK Stadium

1972 Mid-Eastern Athletic Conference football standings
	Conf.					Overall
Team	W		L		T	W		L		T
No. 10 North Carolina Central $	5	–	1	–	0	9	–	2	–	0
No. 13 North Carolina A&T	4	–	2	–	0	8	–	2	–	0
Morgan State	4	–	2	–	0	5	–	5	–	0
Maryland Eastern Shore	4	–	2	–	0	4	–	5	–	0
Howard	2	–	4	–	0	6	–	4	–	0
Delaware State	2	–	4	–	0	5	–	4	–	0
South Carolina State	0	–	6	–	0	1	–	9	–	0
$ – Conference champion; Rankings from NAIA Division I poll

The 1972 Howard Bison football team represented Howard University as a member of the Mid-Eastern Athletic Conference (MEAC) during the 1972 NCAA College Division football season. Led by tenth-year head coach Tillman Sease, the Bison compiled an overall record of 6–4, with a mark of 2–4 in conference play, and finished tied for fifth in the MEAC.

== Schedule ==
Date	Opponent	Site	Result	Attendance	Source
September 9	at Virginia Union*	Hovey Field; Richmond, VA	W 23–6	6,000	
September 16	at Maryland Eastern Shore	Princess Anne, MD	L 8–20	1,100	
September 23	South Carolina State	Howard Stadium; Washington, DC	W 10–0	7,000–8,750	
September 30	at Virginia State*	Rogers Stadium; Ettrick, VA	W 17–0	4,200	
October 7	Delaware State	Howard Stadium; Washington, DC	W 10–0	7,200	
October 14	at West Virginia State*	Dickerson Stadium; Institute, WV	W 21–0	5,500	
October 21	North Carolina A&T^{†}	RFK Stadium; Washington, DC	L 0–7	13,430–17,500	
October 28	at Hampton*	Armstrong Stadium; Hampton, VA (rivalry)	L 21–6	7,250	
November 4	at Morgan State	Baltimore Memorial Stadium; Baltimore, MD (rivalry)	L 13–35	15,102–15,300	
November 11	North Carolina Central	Howard Stadium; Washington, DC	L 13–14	8,000–9,800	
*Non-conference game; ^{†}Homecoming
