= 1972 North Carolina Central Eagles football team =

American college football season

1972 North Carolina Central Eagles football

MEAC champion

Pelican Bowl, L 6–56 vs. Grambling
- Conference: Mid-Eastern Athletic Conference
- Record: 9–2 (5–1 MEAC)
- Head coach: George Quiett (5th season)
- Home stadium: Durham County Memorial Stadium

1972 Mid-Eastern Athletic Conference football standings
	Conf.					Overall
Team	W		L		T	W		L		T
No. 10 North Carolina Central $	5	–	1	–	0	9	–	2	–	0
No. 13 North Carolina A&T	4	–	2	–	0	8	–	2	–	0
Morgan State	4	–	2	–	0	5	–	5	–	0
Maryland Eastern Shore	4	–	2	–	0	4	–	5	–	0
Howard	2	–	4	–	0	6	–	4	–	0
Delaware State	2	–	4	–	0	5	–	4	–	0
South Carolina State	0	–	6	–	0	1	–	9	–	0
$ – Conference champion; Rankings from NAIA Division I poll

The 1972 North Carolina Central Eagles football team represented North Carolina Central University as a member of the Mid-Eastern Athletic Conference (MEAC) during the 1972 NCAA College Division football season. Led by fifth-year head coach George Quiett, the Eagles compiled an overall record of 9–2, with a mark of 5–1 in conference play, and finished as MEAC champion.

== Schedule ==
Date	Opponent	Site	Result	Attendance	Source
September 9	Winston-Salem State*	Durham County Memorial Stadium; Durham, NC	W 29–6	12,000	
September 16	at Elon*	Burlington Memorial Stadium; Burlington, NC	W 41–21	6,000	
September 23	Livingstone*	Durham County Memorial Stadium; Durham, NC	W 47–13	10,000	
September 30	at Morgan State	Hughes Stadium; Baltimore, MD	W 29–7	5,117–7,000	
October 14	at Delaware State	Alumni Stadium; Dover, DE	L 10–14	10,000	
October 21	Maryland Eastern Shore^{†}	Durham County Memorial Stadium; Durham, NC	W 42–20	16,000	
October 28	at South Carolina State	State College Stadium; Orangeburg, SC	W 43–0	7,429–9,000	
November 4	Johnson C. Smith*	Durham County Memorial Stadium; Durham, NC	W 29–8	8,000	
November 11	at Howard	Howard Stadium; Washington, DC	W 14–13	8,000–9,800	
November 18	vs. North Carolina A&T	Wallace Wade Stadium; Durham, NC (rivalry)	W 9–7	20,000–33,000	
December 2	vs. No. 8 Grambling*	Wallace Wade Stadium; Durham, NC (Pelican Bowl)	L 6–56	22,500	
*Non-conference game; ^{†}Homecoming; Rankings from AP Poll released prior to the game
