= 1972 North Carolina A&T Aggies football team =

American college football season

1972 North Carolina A&T Aggies football
- Conference: Mid-Eastern Athletic Conference
- Record: 8–2 (4–2 MEAC)
- Head coach: Hornsby Howell (5th season)
- Home stadium: World War Memorial Stadium

1972 Mid-Eastern Athletic Conference football standings
	Conf.					Overall
Team	W		L		T	W		L		T
No. 10 North Carolina Central $	5	–	1	–	0	9	–	2	–	0
No. 13 North Carolina A&T	4	–	2	–	0	8	–	2	–	0
Morgan State	4	–	2	–	0	5	–	5	–	0
Maryland Eastern Shore	4	–	2	–	0	4	–	5	–	0
Howard	2	–	4	–	0	6	–	4	–	0
Delaware State	2	–	4	–	0	5	–	4	–	0
South Carolina State	0	–	6	–	0	1	–	9	–	0
$ – Conference champion; Rankings from NAIA Division I poll

The 1972 North Carolina A&T Aggies football team represented North Carolina A&T State University as a member of the Mid-Eastern Athletic Conference (MEAC) during the 1972 NCAA College Division football season. Led by fifth-year head coach Hornsby Howell, the Aggies compiled an overall record of 8–2, with a mark of 4–2 in conference play, and finished tied for second in the MEAC.

== Schedule ==
Date	Opponent	Site	Result	Attendance	Source
September 9	Elizabeth City State*	World War Memorial Stadium; Greensboro, NC	W 13–0	12,500	
September 16	South Carolina State	World War Memorial Stadium; Greensboro, NC (rivalry)	W 41–7	7,125–9,050	
September 23	at Florida A&M*	Bragg Memorial Stadium; Tallahassee, FL	W 22–20	12,000	
September 30	at Johnson C. Smith*	American Legion Memorial Stadium; Charlotte, NC	W 23–12	10,000	
October 7	Norfolk State*	World War Memorial Stadium; Greensboro, NC	W 35–14	11,000	
October 14	at Maryland Eastern Shore	Princess Anne, MD	L 14–23	3,150	
October 21	at Howard	RFK Stadium; Washington, DC	W 7–0	13,430–17,500	
October 28	Morgan State	World War Memorial Stadium; Greensboro, NC	W 16–13	17,000–18,752	
November 11	Delaware State	World War Memorial Stadium; Greensboro, NC	W 13–7	7,300	
November 18	vs. North Carolina Central	Wallace Wade Stadium; Durham, NC (rivalry)	L 7–9	20,000–33,000	
*Non-conference game
