= 1972 small college football rankings =

- Selectors: AP, UPI
- No. 1: Delaware
- Small college football rankings (AP, UPI)
- «1971 1973»

The 1972 small college football rankings are rankings of college football teams representing smaller college and university teams during the 1972 college football season, including the 1972 NCAA College Division football season and the 1972 NAIA football season. Separate rankings were published by the Associated Press (AP) and the United Press International (UPI). The AP rankings were selected by a board of sports writers, and the UPI rankings were selected by a board of small-college coaches.

The 1972 Delaware Fightin' Blue Hens football team (10–0), led by head coach Tubby Raymond, was rated No. 1 by both the AP and UPI. Louisiana Tech (12–0) and Cal Poly (8–1–1) were ranked No. 2 and No. 3, respectively, by the AP and UPI.

1972 was the last year the polls were used to crown a national "Small College" or "College Division" champion. In 1973, season-ending playoffs were begun to determine a champion for "Division II". The UPI and AP continued publishing "College Division" polls through the 1974 season.

== Legend ==
	Increase in ranking
	Decrease in ranking
	Not ranked previous week
(#–#)	Win–loss record
(Italics)	Number of first place votes
т	Tied with team above or below also with this symbol

== AP poll ==
	Week 1 Sept 21	Week 2 Sept 28	Week 3 Oct 5	Week 4 Oct 12	Week 5 Oct 19	Week 6 Oct 26	Week 7 Nov 2	Week 8 Nov 9	Week 9 Nov 16	Week 10 Nov 23	
1.	Delaware (1–0) (9)	Delaware (2–0) (11)	Delaware (3–0) (11)	Louisiana Tech (5–0) (7)	Louisiana Tech (6–0) (8)	Delaware (6–0) (11)	Delaware (7–0) (14)	Delaware (8–0) (10)	Delaware (9–0) (13)	Delaware (10–0) (9)	1.
2.	North Dakota (1–0)	Louisiana Tech (3–0) (4)	Louisiana Tech (4–0) (1)	Delaware (4–0) (7)	Delaware (5–0) (7)	Louisiana Tech (7–0) (7)	Louisiana Tech (8–0) (3)	Louisiana Tech (9–0) (4)	Louisiana Tech (10–0) (4)	Louisiana Tech (11–0) (4)	2.
3.	Louisiana Tech (2–0) (2)	Tennessee State (2–0) (1)	Tennessee State (3–0) (1)	North Dakota (5–0) (2)	North Dakota (6–0) (2)	Cal Poly (5–0)	Cal Poly (6–0)	Cal Poly (6–0–1)	Cal Poly (7–0–1)	Cal Poly (8–0–1)	3.
4.	Tennessee State (1–0) (2)	North Dakota (3–0) (2)	North Dakota (4–0) (1)	Cal Poly (4–0) (1) (Note: In the actual printed polls, Cal Poly was listed as San Luis Obispo or Cal Poly SLO)	McNeese State (4–1)	Tennessee State (5–1)	Tennessee State (6–1) (1)	Tennessee State (7–1)	Ashland (10–0)	Ashland (11–0) (1)	4.
5.	McNeese State (2–0) (1) т	Boise State (2–0)	Drake (3–0) (1)	McNeese State (3–1)	Western Illinois (6–0) (1)	McNeese State (5–1)	Ashland (8–0)	South Dakota (8–1)	Tennessee State (8–1)	Tennessee State (8–1)	5.
6.	Akron (1–0–1) т	Carson–Newman (3–0)	Boise State (3–0)	Carson–Newman (5–0)	Cal Poly (4–0)	North Dakota State (7–1)	North Dakota State (8–1)	Ashland (9–0)	South Dakota (9–1) (1)	South Dakota (9–1) (1) т	6.
7.	Boise State (1–0)	Texas Southern (2–0)	Carson–Newman (4–0)	Western Illinois (5–0)	Boise State (4–1)	Ashland (7–0)	McNeese State (6–1)	North Dakota (8–1)	North Dakota (9–1)	North Dakota (9–1) т	7.
8.	Texas Southern (2–0)	Drake (2–0)	McNeese State (2–1)	Boise State (3–1)	Tennessee State (4–1)	North Dakota (6–1)	North Dakota (7–1)	Grambling (7–2)	Grambling (8–2)	Grambling (8–2) т	8.
9.	South Dakota (1–0)	Western Carolina (3–0)	Fresno State (4–0)	Tennessee State (3–1)	Drake (4–1)	Fresno State (5–1–1)	Grambling (6–2)	Idaho State (6–2)	McNeese State (7–2)	Western Carolina (7–2–1) т	9.
10.	Carson–Newman (2–0)	McNeese State (2–1)	Western Illinois (4–0)	Livingston (6–0)	Ashland (6–0)	Western Illinois (6–1)	UMass (6–0) (Note: In the actual printed polls, UMass was listed as Massachusetts)	McNeese State (6–2)	Drake (7–2)	Carson–Newman (9–1) т	10.
11.										McNeese State (8–2) т	11.
	Week 1 Sept 21	Week 2 Sept 28	Week 3 Oct 5	Week 4 Oct 12	Week 5 Oct 19	Week 6 Oct 26	Week 7 Nov 2	Week 8 Nov 9	Week 9 Nov 16	Week 10 Nov 23	
		Dropped: 6 Akron; 9 South Dakota	Dropped: 7 Texas Southern; 9 Western Carolina	Dropped: 5 Drake; 9 Fresno State	Dropped: 6 Carson–Newman; 10 Livingston	Dropped: 7 Boise State; 9 Drake	Dropped: 9 Fresno State; 10 Western Illinois	Dropped: 6 North Dakota State; 10 UMass	Dropped: 9 Idaho State	Dropped: 10 Drake	

== UPI coaches poll ==
	Week Preseason	Week 1 Sept 13	Week 2 Sept 20	Week 3 Sept 27	Week 4 Oct 4	Week 5 Oct 11	Week 6 Oct 18	Week 7 Oct 25	Week 8 Nov 1	Week 9 Nov 8	Week 10 Nov 15	Week 11 Nov 22	
1.	Delaware (22)	Delaware (0–0) (22)	Delaware (1–0) (19)	Delaware (2–0) (21)	Delaware (3–0) (21)	Delaware (4–0) (21)	Delaware (5–0) (19)	Delaware (6–0) (20)	Delaware (7–0) (25)	Delaware (8–0) (23)	Delaware (9–0) (23)	Delaware (10–0) (21)	1.
2.	Eastern Michigan (3)	Eastern Michigan (1–0) (2)	McNeese State (2–0) (4)	Louisiana Tech (3–0) (5)	Louisiana Tech (4–0) (5)	Louisiana Tech (4–0) (11)	Louisiana Tech (5–0) (15)	Louisiana Tech (7–0) (15)	Louisiana Tech (8–0) (8)	Louisiana Tech (9–0) (9)	Louisiana Tech (10–0) (9)	Louisiana Tech (11–0) (12)	2.
3.	Tennessee State (1)	McNeese State (1–0) (2)	Louisiana Tech (2–0) (3)	Drake (2–0) (5)	Drake (3–0) (8)	North Dakota (5–0)	North Dakota (6–0)	Cal Poly (5–0–1)	Cal Poly (6–0–1) (1)	Cal Poly (6–0–1) (1)	Cal Poly (7–0–1) (1)	Cal Poly (8–0–1) (1)	3.
4.	McNeese State (1)	Tennessee State (1–0) (1)	Tennessee State (2–0) (4)	North Dakota (3–0) (1)	North Dakota (4–0)	Cal Poly (4–0)	McNeese State (4–1)	McNeese State (5–1)	McNeese State (6–1)	Tennessee State (8–1)	Tennessee State (9–1)	South Dakota (9–1) (1)	4.
5.	Grambling (1)	North Dakota (1–0) (2)	North Dakota (2–0) (2)	Tennessee State (3–0) (2)	Tennessee State (4–0) (1)	McNeese State (3–1)	Western Illinois (5–0)	Tennessee State (6–1)	Tennessee State (7–1)	South Dakota (8–1)	South Dakota (9–1) (1)	Tennessee State (9–1)	5.
6.	Louisiana Tech (1)	Grambling (1–0) (1)	Boise State (1–0)	Boise State (2–0)	Boise State (3–0)	Western Illinois (5–0) (1)	Cal Poly (4–0–1)	Fresno State (5–1–1)	UMass (6–0)	North Dakota (8–1)	North Dakota (9–1)	North Dakota (9–1)	6.
7.	Boise State	Louisiana Tech (1–0)	Drake (1–0)	Texas Southern (2–0)	Fresno State (4–0)	Livingston State (5–0)	Tennessee State (5–1)	UMass (5–0)	South Dakota (7–1)	Ashland (9–0)	Ashland (10–0)	Ashland (11–0)	7.
8.	North Dakota	Boise State (0–0)	Akron (1–0–1)	McNeese State (2–1)	McNeese State (2–1)	Carson–Newman (5–0)	Drake (4–1)	Livingston State (6–0–1)	North Dakota (7–1)	Tennessee Tech (8–1) (1)	Tennessee Tech (9–1)	Tennessee Tech (10–1)	8.
9.	North Dakota State	North Dakota State (2–0)	Texas Southern (2–0)	Lamar (3–0)	Carson–Newman (4–0)	Drake (3–1)	Fresno State (4–1–1)	Hawaii (5–0)	Ashland (8–0)	Grambling (7–2)	Grambling (8–2)	Grambling (8–2)	9.
10.	Akron т	Arkansas Tech (1–0) (1)	Eastern Michigan (1–1)	Western Carolina (3–0) (1)	Livingston State (4–0)	Fresno State (4–1)	Boise State (4–1)	South Dakota (6–1)	North Dakota State (7–1)	Drake (6–2) (1)	Drake (7–2) (1)	Carson–Newman (9–1)	10.
11.	Arkansas Tech т	Tennessee Tech (1–0)	South Dakota (2–0)	Carson–Newman (3–0)	Western Illinois (3–0)	Jackson State (4–0)	Livingston State (5–0–1)	North Dakota (6–1)	Tennessee Tech (7–1) (1)	Carson–Newman (8–1)	Bridgeport (9–0)	Bridgeport (10–0)	11.
12.	Western Kentucky	Lehigh (1–0)	Carson–Newman (2–0)	Livingston State (3–0)	Cal Poly (3–0)	Tennessee State (4–1)	Hawaii (4–0)	Ashland (7–0)	Hawaii (5–1)	Idaho State (6–2)	Carson–Newman (8–1)	Livingston State (8–1–1)	12.
13.	Texas A&I (1)	Texas Southern (1–0) т	Angelo State (2–0) (1)	Fresno State (3–0)	Jackson State (3–0)	Nebraska–Omaha (5–0)	Jackson State (5–0)	Carson–Newman (6–1)	Carson–Newman (7–1)	Livingston State (6–2–1)	Livingston State (7–1–1)	Drake (7–3)	13.
14.	Samford	Akron (0–0–1) т	Livingston State (2–0)	Western Illinois (2–0)	Nebraska–Omaha (4–0)	Boise State (3–1)	UMass (4–0)	North Dakota State (6–1)	Fresno State (5–2–1)	McNeese State (6–2)	Northwestern State (7–2)	Idaho State (7–3)	14.
15.	Northern Colorado	Northern Colorado (0–0) (1)	Lamar (2–0)	Weber State (1–0)	Texas Southern (2–1)	Hawaii (3–0)	South Dakota (5–1)	Grambling (5–2)	Drake (5–2)	UMass (6–1)	Missouri Southern State (10–0)	Northwestern State (8–2)	15.
16.	Southwest Texas	Drake (0–0)	Northern Colorado (1–0)	Hawaii (2–0) т	Hawaii (2–0)	UMass (3–0)	Western Carolina (4–1–1)	Tennessee Tech (6–1)	East Texas State (6–1)	Jackson State (7–1)	Fort Valley State (8–0)	North Carolina Central (9–1)	16.
17.	Drake	South Dakota (1–0)	Grambling (1–1)	Jackson State (2–0) т	Western Carolina (3–1)	North Carolina A&T (5–0)	Grambling (4–2)	Western Illinois (5–1)	Livingston State (6–1–1)	Central Oklahoma (8–0)	UC Davis (6–0–2)	East Texas State (8–2)	17.
18.	C.W. Post	Livingston State (1–0) т	Western Carolina (2–0) (1)	Tennessee Tech (2–1)	UMass (2–0)	Western Carolina (4–1)	Samford (5–1)	Nebraska–Omaha (6–1)	Nebraska–Omaha (6–1)	Northwestern State (6–2) (Note: In the actual printed polls, Northwestern State was listed as Northwestern Louisiana)	North Carolina A&T (8–1)	Missouri Southern State (10–0)	18.
19.	Arkansas State	Angelo State (1–0) т	Alcorn A&M (1–0)	Cal Poly (2–0)	East Texas State (3–1) т	Ashland (5–0)	Ashland (6–0)	East Texas State (5–1)	Idaho State (5–2)	Bridgeport (8–0)	McNeese State (7–2)	Western Carolina (7–2–1) т	19.
20.	Livingston State т	Carson–Newman (1–0)	Lehigh (1–1)	UMass (1–0)	Florida A&M (1–1) т	East Texas State (4–1)	Carson–Newman (5–1)	Montana State (5–2)	Central Washington (7–0)	UC Davis (5–0–2)	Western Carolina (6–2–1)	McNeese State (8–2) т	20.
21.	Tennessee Tech т	Saint John's (MN) (0–0) (Note: In the September 13th poll, Saint John's was listed as #20 but there were 20 teams listed ahead of them and they did not tie for 20th. They have been included here, but they shouldn't have been listed in the poll in 1972 (same error as week 4).)			Middle Tennessee (3–0–1) (Note: In the October 4th poll, Middle Tennessee was listed as #20 but there were 20 teams listed ahead of them and they did not tie for 20th. They have been included here, but they shouldn't have been listed in the poll in 1972 (same error as week 1).)								21.
	Week Preseason	Week 1 Sept 13	Week 2 Sept 20	Week 3 Sept 27	Week 4 Oct 4	Week 5 Oct 11	Week 6 Oct 18	Week 7 Oct 25	Week 8 Nov 1	Week 9 Nov 8	Week 10 Nov 15	Week 11 Nov 22	
		Dropped: 12 Western Kentucky; 13 Texas A&I; 14 Samford; 16 Southwest Texas; 18 C.W. Post; 19 Arkansas State	Dropped: 9 North Dakota State; 10 Arkansas Tech; 11 Tennessee Tech; 21 Saint John's (MN)	Dropped: 8 Akron; 10 Eastern Michigan; 11 South Dakota; 13 Angelo State; 16 Northern Colorado; 17 Grambling; 19 Alcorn A&M; 20 Lehigh	Dropped: 9 Lamar; 15 Weber State; 18 Tennessee Tech	Dropped: 15 Texas Southern; 20 Florida A&M; 21 Middle Tennessee	Dropped: 13 Nebraska–Omaha; 17 North Carolina A&T; 20 East Texas State	Dropped: 8 Drake; 10 Boise State; 13 Jackson State; 16 Western Carolina; 18 Samford	Dropped: 15 Grambling; 17 Western Illinois; 20 Montana State	Dropped: 10 North Dakota State; 12 Hawaii; 14 Fresno State; 16 East Texas State; 18 Nebraska–Omaha; 20 Central Washington	Dropped: 12 Idaho State; 15 UMass; 16 Jackson State; 17 Central Oklahoma	Dropped: 16 Fort Valley State; 17 UC Davis; 18 North Carolina A&T	

== HBCU rankings ==
The Mutual Black Network ranked the top 1972 teams from historically black colleges and universities.

- 1. Grambling (11–2)
- 2. Tennessee State (11–1)
- 3. Albany State (7–2–1)
- 4. Jackson State (8–3)
- 5. North Carolina College (9–2)
- 6. Fort Valley State (8–2)
- 7. North Carolina A&T (9–2)
- 8. Fisk (7–1–1)
- 9. Alabama A&M (7–1–1)
- 10. Virginia State (7–3)
