= Pelican Bowl =

Defunct Louisiana-based NCAA Division II bowl game

Pelican Bowl (defunct)
- Stadium: Louisiana Superdome
- Location: New Orleans, Louisiana
- Previous stadiums: Wallace Wade Stadium (1972); Tulane Stadium (1974)
- Previous locations: Durham, North Carolina
- Operated: 1972, 1974–75
- Conference tie-ins: MEAC, SWAC

The Pelican Bowl is a defunct, Louisiana-based NCAA Division II (Note: At the time of the bowl's creation in 1972, the NCAA was divided into the "University Division" and "College Division". The current three-division setup was established in 1973. The conferences that participated in this game eventually became NCAA Division I conferences, and their members' football programs now compete in the Football Championship Subdivision) bowl game that was intended to match the overall champions or top-seeded co-champions from the then-new Mid-Eastern Athletic Conference (MEAC) and the long-established Southwestern Athletic Conference (SWAC) to determine the black college football national championship in the United States between 1972 and 1975. The game was won by the SWAC opponent in all three editions of the bowl. Due to low attendance, the game folded following the 1975 contest; the concept would be revived from 1991 to 1999 with the Heritage Bowl and again in 2015 with the Celebration Bowl.

== History ==
=== Background ===
The inaugural Pelican Bowl was originally scheduled to be played at A. W. Mumford Stadium on the campus of Southern University in Baton Rouge, Louisiana. However, due to campus unrest in the wake of an on-campus shooting on November 16, 1972, officials from both the SWAC and MEAC decided to move the game to another location. An announcement was officially made to move the game on November 21 to Wallace Wade Stadium in Durham, North Carolina. The game marked the first bowl game played in the state of North Carolina since the 1942 Rose Bowl, which was also temporarily relocated there. In the inaugural contest Grambling State defeated North Carolina Central 56–6 to capture the 1972 black college football national championship.

The 1973 contest was scheduled to be played at Tulane Stadium in New Orleans. However, in November 1973 league officials announced the cancellation of the game as a result of both unavailability of the stadium for the contest on December 1 (the annual rivalry between LSU and Tulane was scheduled for that date), in addition to the NCAA not officially sanctioning the game for play. Furthermore, the bowl game was now also facing an identity crisis with the creation of the Division II playoffs that year and the incorporation of other Division II bowls into the new playoff format. With the cancellation of the Pelican Bowl, the SWAC's top-seeded co-champion, Grambling, had no conflict of interest by participating in the inaugural playoffs.

In the fall of 1974, the SWAC commissioner announced that the game had been officially sanctioned and would be played in New Orleans on December 7. However, the bowl was not revived completely without issues. SWAC co-champion Alcorn State was the conference's top seed but elected to compete in the Division II playoffs over the still-fledgling Pelican Bowl. Grambling—also SWAC co-champion but the conference's second seed because of a loss to Alcorn—represented the SWAC in the Pelican Bowl in Alcorn's place. Regardless, before 30,120 fans, Grambling captured its second Pelican Bowl championship with its 28–7 victory over South Carolina State. Despite the fact that one of the participating schools was a conference second seed—and that Alcorn had beaten both participating schools, on the road yet—the game was still billed as being for the black national championship.

The next year, although Grambling was selected as the consensus black college football national champion—they had even defeated both Hawaii and Oregon State of NCAA Division I on the road over consecutive weekends—they were unable to participate in the 1975 Pelican Bowl after forfeiting their game against Prairie View A&M. As such, SWAC athletic directors voted for Southern—the conference's remaining co-champion with Jackson State but also the top seed—to play in the contest against MEAC champion South Carolina State. The Bulldogs agreed to participate despite the fact that the SWAC still owed them money for their 1974 appearance. The SWAC was criticized for not insisting that either school bring their marching band and for accepting the "Sugar Bowl 1975" logo at midfield in the Louisiana Superdome instead of requesting that it be replaced with a reference to the Pelican Bowl or otherwise be concealed. In addition, the SWAC also endured criticism for keeping 60% of the game proceeds while splitting only the remaining 40% between the two participating schools—and giving nothing to the MEAC (which was apparently not directly involved with the game). Before a sparse crowd of 6,748 at the Superdome, Southern was victorious 15–12 and was awarded the black national title.

=== Legacy ===
Due to the low attendance, the Pelican Bowl folded. However, as late as December 5, 1976, the Superdome was still scheduled to host the December 11, 1976 edition of the bowl. By November 10, 1977, the SWAC still owed $24,000 to Tulane University for the use of their stadium for the 1974 game. Meanwhile, from 1976 through 1980, the MEAC champion met the champion of the Central Intercollegiate Athletic Association (CIAA) in the Gold Bowl, held in Richmond, Virginia. Gold Bowl winners were recognized as Black college football national champions, at least in 1976 and 1977. Finally, in 1991, the concept of a postseason bowl game featuring the MEAC and SWAC was revived with the introduction of the Heritage Bowl.

In retrospect the bowl faced numerous challenges that may have been insurmountable. It was created just a single year before other Division II bowl games were merged into the division's new playoff format, leaving the Pelican Bowl in an isolated position starting with the 1974 season. Also in 1974, since the bowl was based in New Orleans, it was quickly overshadowed by the new Bayou Classic with its heated rivalry game, battle of the bands, parade, beauty pageant, and other such events that soon made it the biggest spectacle in black college football; by the standards that the Bayou Classic had set for entertainment, the Pelican Bowl almost seemed anticlimactic, despite being for a bigger prize (the black national title). It did not help the Pelican Bowl's prospects that the SWAC largely ran the bowl by itself, with little support from the MEAC. Both conferences, though similar in that they represented Division II black schools, were very different in other regards, with different experiences, and moving at different paces. The SWAC consisted largely of Deep South schools, created in 1920 out of necessity while facing the brunt of the Jim Crow era; SWAC schools (other than the notable exception of Grambling) were still struggling to recruit with the Southeastern Conference (especially LSU, which was signing many of the top African-American players from the deep talent pool provided by Louisiana's high schools) now integrated. The MEAC, on the other hand, was formed by East Coast schools in the post-segregation world of 1970, during a time when many of its member schools were now regularly scheduling predominantly white teams; it had already had some time to adapt to new recruiting strategies, since the neighboring Atlantic Coast Conference had begun integrating four years before the SEC had. Years later, when the Heritage Bowl was created (in 1991), it too seemed to have been viewed differently by the two conferences, as the MEAC champions showed a much higher tendency to forgo their bowl bid in favor of NCAA playoff invitations. By 2015, however, both leagues appeared equally cooperative and supportive of the new Celebration Bowl.

== Game results ==
Date	SWAC representative		MEAC representative		Venue	Attendance	Offensive MVP	Defensive MVP
December 2, 1972	Grambling *	56	North Carolina Central *	6	Wallace Wade Stadium (Durham, NC)	22,500	Matthew Reed, QB (Grambling State)	Walt Baisy, LB (Grambling State)
December 7, 1974	Grambling State	28	South Carolina State *	7	Tulane Stadium (New Orleans, LA)	30,120	Doug Williams, QB (Grambling State)	Robert Simms, DT (South Carolina State)
December 27, 1975	Southern *	15	South Carolina State *	12	Louisiana Superdome (New Orleans, LA)	6,748	(unavailable)	(unavailable)

Note: an asterisk denotes when the conference was represented by its outright champion or top-seeded co-champion

=== 1972 game ===
Summary

Team	1	2	3	4	Total
• Grambling	21	14	7	14	56
NC Central	0	6	0	0	6

- Location: Wallace Wade Stadium
  Durham, NC
- Game attendance: 22,500

For the 1972 contest North Carolina Central secured a berth first after defeating North Carolina A&T 9–7 to clinch the MEAC championship on November 18. The following week, Grambling secured their spot in the bowl as SWAC co-champions with a loss by Alcorn (who was previously 4–0–1 in conference play) against Jackson State (who was now 5–1 in the SWAC, and with whom Grambling owned the tiebreaker). In the inaugural contest Grambling routed Central 56–6 in capturing the 1972 black college football national championship.

Grambling running back Rod Tureaud opened the scoring with touchdown runs of one and 56-yards to give the Tigers a 14–0 lead. Tureaud was injured later in the period, and his replacement Lee Fobbs answered with a 55-yard touchdown run to give Grambling a 21–0 lead at the end of the first quarter. Central opened the second quarter with their only points of the game coming on an eight-yard Garvin Stone touchdown pass to Jeff Inmon to cut the lead to 21–6 only to see Grambling respond with another pair of touchdowns before the half. Matthew Reed hit Jackie Jefferson for a 14-yard touchdown reception and Steve Dennis intercepted a Stone pass and returned it 70-yards for a score as time expired to give the Tigers a 35–6 lead at the half. After extending their lead to 42–6 in the third on a five-yard Reed pass to Oliver Alexander, Grambling scored another pair of touchdowns in the fourth. Herman Christophe scored on a 24-yard run and Eartha Reeves scored the game's final points in a one-yard run to make the final score 56–6. For their performances, Reed was selected as the offensive MVP and linebacker Walt Baisy was selected as the defensive MVP of the game.

=== 1974 game ===
Summary

Team	1	2	3	4	Total
SC State	0	0	0	7	7
• Grambling	7	14	7	0	28

- Location: Tulane Stadium
  New Orleans, LA
- Game attendance: 30,120

In 1974 South Carolina State entered the game as MEAC champions with an 8–3 record. Grambling entered the game as the second-seeded SWAC co-champions, on a ten-game winning streak, with a 10–1 record. For the second time in as many contests Grambling was victorious, this time by a score of 28–7 in capturing the 1974 black college football national championship.

The game started with Grambling's Kenneth Chandler taking the opening kickoff 61 yards to the Bulldog 17-yard line. Three plays later, Doug Williams hit Dwight Scales for a 19-yard touchdown reception and a 7–0 lead. State had opportunities to score in the first, only to see Leroy Mason miss field goals of 49 and 48-yards. In the second quarter, the Tigers' defense reached the endzone after defensive tackle Robert Barber recovered a James Robinson fumble and returned it 34-yards for a 14–0 lead. Williams scored on an eight-yard run late in the second to give Grambling a 21–0 lead at the half. Early in the third, Williams again connected with Scales for a 26-yard touchdown reception and a 28–0 lead. The Bulldogs' scored their lone points in the fourth when Neeley Dunn scored on a one-yard run to make the finals score 28–7. For their performances, Williams was selected as the offensive MVP and Bulldog defensive tackle Robert Simms was selected as the defensive MVP of the game.

=== 1975 game ===
Summary

Team	1	2	3	4	Total
SC State	0	12	0	0	12
• Southern	0	0	0	15	15

- Location: Louisiana Superdome
  New Orleans, LA
- Game attendance: 6,748

For the 1975 game South Carolina State entered the game as MEAC champions for the second year in a row, with an 8–1–1 record. The Southern Jaguars entered the game as the top-seeded SWAC co-champions, with a 9–3 record. For the third time in as many contests, the SWAC representative was victorious, this time being Southern by a score of 15–12.

In a game dominated by both defenses, the Bulldogs scored a pair of second-quarter touchdowns following Jaguar fumbles on consecutive possessions. The first came on an eleven-yard Jessie Prather pass to Mickey Pringle, and the second came on a one-yard Jackie Reed run to take a 12–0 lead. State retained the lead through the fourth quarter when Southern scored a pair of touchdowns the lead late. Michael Bryant scored first on a 10-yard run, and James Johnson hit Ronald Steele for a 29-yard touchdown reception (with Bryant then converting the two-point conversion) to give the Jaguars a 15–12 victory.
