= 1972 NCAA College Division football season =

American college football season

- Champion(s): Delaware (AP, UPI); Grambling (black)

The 1972 NCAA College Division football season was the 17th and final season of college football in the United States organized by the National Collegiate Athletic Association at the NCAA College Division level.

== Conference realignment ==
=== Membership changes ===
School	1971 conference	1972 conference
Newark State	New program	New Jersey State
William Paterson	New program	New Jersey State

== Conference standings ==
1972 Big Sky Conference football standings
	Conf.					Overall
Team	W		L		T	W		L		T
Montana State $	5	–	1	–	0	8	–	3	–	0
Idaho State	4	–	1	–	0	7	–	3	–	0
Boise State	3	–	3	–	0	7	–	4	–	0
Montana	3	–	3	–	0	3	–	8	–	0
Idaho	2	–	3	–	0	4	–	7	–	0
Weber State	2	–	4	–	0	5	–	5	–	0
Northern Arizona	0	–	4	–	0	3	–	8	–	0
$ – Conference champion

1972 California Collegiate Athletic Association football standings
	Conf.					Overall
Team	W		L		T	W		L		T
No. 3/3 Cal Poly +	3	–	0	–	0	8	–	1	–	1
UC Riverside +	3	–	0	–	0	9	–	1	–	0
Cal State Fullerton	2	–	2	–	0	7	–	4	–	0
Cal State Northridge	1	–	3	–	0	6	–	5	–	0
Cal Poly Pomona	0	–	4	–	0	4	–	6	–	0
+ – Conference co-champions; Rankings from AP/UPI small college polls

1972 Central Intercollegiate Athletic Association football standings
	Conf.					Overall
Team	W		L		T	W		L		T
Northern
Virginia State xy$	5	–	0	–	0	8	–	3	–	0
Virginia Union	3	–	2	–	0	6	–	3	–	0
Elizabeth City State	3	–	2	–	0	5	–	5	–	0
Norfolk State	3	–	2	–	0	3	–	7	–	0
Hampton	1	–	4	–	0	1	–	10	–	0
Saint Paul's (VA)	0	–	5	–	0	0	–	9	–	0
Southern
Johnson C. Smith xy	4	–	0	–	0	6	–	5	–	0
Winston-Salem State	3	–	1	–	0	5	–	4	–	0
Fayetteville State	2	–	2	–	0	6	–	3	–	0
Shaw	1	–	3	–	0	3	–	5	–	0
Livingstone	0	–	4	–	0	2	–	8	–	0
Championship: Virginia State 17, Johnson C. Smith 6
$ – Conference champion; x – Division champion/co-champions; y – Championship game participant

1972 College Athletic Conference football standings
	Conf.					Overall
Team	W		L		T	W		L		T
Washington University $	4	–	0	–	0	6	–	3	–	0
Centre	3	–	1	–	0	4	–	5	–	0
Southwestern (TN)	1	–	3	–	0	4	–	4	–	0
Sewanee	1	–	3	–	0	3	–	5	–	0
Washington and Lee	1	–	3	–	0	3	–	6	–	0
$ – Conference champion

1972 College Conference of Illinois and Wisconsin football standings
	Conf.					Overall
Team	W		L		T	W		L		T
No. 6 Carthage $	7	–	1	–	0	8	–	1	–	0
No. 16 Millikin	6	–	2	–	0	7	–	2	–	0
Augustana (IL)	5	–	3	–	0	6	–	3	–	0
Carroll (WI)	5	–	3	–	0	6	–	3	–	0
Elmhurst	5	–	3	–	0	6	–	3	–	0
Illinois Wesleyan	4	–	4	–	0	4	–	5	–	0
North Park	2	–	5	–	1	2	–	6	–	1
Wheaton (IL)	1	–	7	–	0	1	–	8	–	0
North Central (IL)	0	–	7	–	1	0	–	7	–	2
$ – Conference champion; Rankings from NAIA Division II poll

1972 Eastern Football Conference football standings
	Conf.					Overall
Team	W		L		T	W		L		T
Glassboro State +	2	–	1	–	0	7	–	2	–	0
Central Connecticut State +	2	–	1	–	0	5	–	5	–	0
Montclair State	1	–	2	–	0	6	–	4	–	0
Southern Connecticut State	1	–	2	–	0	4	–	6	–	0
+ – Conference co-champions

1972 Far Western Conference football standings
	Conf.					Overall
Team	W		L		T	W		L		T
UC Davis $	5	–	0	–	0	6	–	2	–	2
Humboldt State	4	–	1	–	0	7	–	3	–	0
Chico State	2	–	3	–	0	4	–	5	–	0
Cal State Hayward	2	–	3	–	0	2	–	8	–	0
San Francisco State	1	–	4	–	0	3	–	8	–	0
Sacramento State	1	–	4	–	0	2	–	8	–	0
$ – Conference champion

1972 Gulf South Conference football standings
	Conf.					Overall
Team	W		L		T	W		L		T
No. 5 Northwestern State $	6	–	0	–	0	8	–	2	–	0
No. 3 Livingston ^	5	–	1	–	0	8	–	1	–	2
No. 19 Jacksonville State	4	–	1	–	1	7	–	2	–	1
Delta State	5	–	2	–	0	7	–	3	–	1
Troy State	2	–	3	–	1	4	–	5	–	1
Southeastern Louisiana	2	–	4	–	0	4	–	7	–	0
Nicholls State	1	–	5	–	0	3	–	8	–	0
Florence State	1	–	5	–	0	2	–	9	–	0
Tennessee–Martin	1	–	5	–	0	1	–	9	–	0
Mississippi College *	0	–	0	–	0	4	–	5	–	1
$ – Conference champion; ^ – NAIA Division I playoff participant * – Did not compete for conference title; Rankings from NAIA Division I poll

1972 Independent College Athletic Conference football standings
	Conf.					Overall
Team	W		L		T	W		L		T
Alfred $	3	–	0	–	0	7	–	1	–	0
Ithaca	2	–	0	–	0	5	–	4	–	0
Hobart	3	–	2	–	0	7	–	2	–	0
St. Lawrence	1	–	2	–	0	5	–	4	–	0
RIT	0	–	2	–	0	4	–	5	–	0
RPI	0	–	3	–	0	1	–	8	–	0
$ – Conference champion

1972 Indiana Collegiate Conference football standings
	Conf.					Overall
Team	W		L		T	W		L		T
Butler +	4	–	1	–	0	5	–	5	–	0
Evansville +	4	–	1	–	0	5	–	5	–	0
Wabash	2	–	2	–	0	4	–	6	–	0
Indiana Central	2	–	3	–	0	4	–	6	–	0
Valparaiso	2	–	3	–	0	6	–	4	–	0
Saint Joseph's (IN)	2	–	3	–	0	4	–	4	–	1
DePauw	1	–	4	–	0	2	–	7	–	0
+ – Conference co-champions

1972 Iowa Conference football standings
	Conf.					Overall
Team	W		L		T	W		L		T
No. 5 William Penn +	6	–	1	–	0	10	–	1	–	0
No. T–14 Buena Vista +	6	–	1	–	0	7	–	2	–	0
Central (IA)	5	–	2	–	0	6	–	3	–	0
Dubuque	3	–	3	–	1	5	–	4	–	1
Luther	3	–	4	–	0	3	–	6	–	0
Simpson (IA)	1	–	4	–	2	2	–	5	–	2
Upper Iowa	1	–	5	–	1	4	–	5	–	1
Wartburg	1	–	6	–	0	3	–	6	–	0
+ – Conference co-champions; Rankings from NAIA Division II poll

1972 Little Three Conference football standings
	Conf.					Overall
Team	W		L		T	W		L		T
Williams $	2	–	0	–	0	7	–	1	–	0
Amherst	1	–	1	–	0	7	–	1	–	0
Wesleyan	0	–	2	–	0	4	–	4	–	0
$ – Conference champion

1972 Maine Intercollegiate Athletic Association football standings
	Conf.					Overall
Team	W		L		T	W		L		T
Colby $	2	–	0	–	0	7	–	1	–	0
Bowdoin	1	–	1	–	0	2	–	5	–	0
Bates	0	–	2	–	0	1	–	7	–	0
$ – Conference champion

1972 Mason–Dixon Conference football standings
	Conf.					Overall
Team	W		L		T	W		L		T
Hampden–Sydney $	3	–	1	–	0	8	–	2	–	0
Randolph–Macon	2	–	1	–	1	7	–	2	–	1
Johns Hopkins	1	–	1	–	0	6	–	3	–	0
Western Maryland	2	–	2	–	0	3	–	6	–	1
Towson State	1	–	2	–	0	1	–	9	–	0
Bridgewater	0	–	2	–	1	4	–	4	–	1
Gallaudet *	0	–	0	–	0	2	–	7	–	0
$ – Conference champion; * – Did not compete for conference title

1972 Metropolitan Intercollegiate Conference football standings
	Conf.					Overall
Team	W		L		T	W		L		T
C. W. Post $	3	–	0	–	0	6	–	3	–	0
Wagner	2	–	1	–	0	7	–	3	–	0
Hofstra	1	–	2	–	0	5	–	6	–	0
Merchant Marine	0	–	3	–	0	5	–	4	–	0
Fordham *	0	–	0	–	0	5	–	5	–	0
$ – Conference champion; * – Did not complete for conference title

1972 Michigan Intercollegiate Athletic Association football standings
	Conf.					Overall
Team	W		L		T	W		L		T
No. 8 Alma +	4	–	1	–	0	8	–	1	–	0
Adrian +	4	–	1	–	0	5	–	4	–	0
Hope	3	–	1	–	1	6	–	2	–	1
Olivet	2	–	3	–	0	3	–	6	–	0
Kalamazoo	1	–	3	–	1	2	–	5	–	1
Albion	0	–	5	–	0	2	–	7	–	0
+ – Conference co-champions; Rankings from NAIA Division II poll

1972 Mid-Eastern Athletic Conference football standings
	Conf.					Overall
Team	W		L		T	W		L		T
No. 10 North Carolina Central $	5	–	1	–	0	9	–	2	–	0
No. 13 North Carolina A&T	4	–	2	–	0	8	–	2	–	0
Morgan State	4	–	2	–	0	5	–	5	–	0
Maryland Eastern Shore	4	–	2	–	0	4	–	5	–	0
Howard	2	–	4	–	0	6	–	4	–	0
Delaware State	2	–	4	–	0	5	–	4	–	0
South Carolina State	0	–	6	–	0	1	–	9	–	0
$ – Conference champion; Rankings from NAIA Division I poll

1972 Middle Atlantic Conference football standings
	Conf.					Overall
Team	W		L		T	W		L		T
Northern Division
Albright x	7	–	0	–	0	8	–	1	–	0
Juniata	5	–	1	–	0	6	–	3	–	0
Wilkes	4	–	2	–	0	4	–	5	–	0
Delaware Valley	4	–	4	–	0	4	–	4	–	0
Upsala	3	–	4	–	0	3	–	5	–	0
Susquehanna	2	–	4	–	0	3	–	6	–	0
Lycoming	2	–	5	–	0	2	–	6	–	0
Wagner *	2	–	1	–	0	7	–	3	–	0
Southern Division
Franklin & Marshall x	8	–	0	–	0	9	–	0	–	0
Widener	6	–	1	–	0	8	–	1	–	0
Johns Hopkins	5	–	2	–	0	6	–	3	–	0
Ursinus	5	–	3	–	0	5	–	3	–	0
Dickinson	4	–	3	–	0	4	–	4	–	0
Lebanon Valley	4	–	5	–	0	4	–	5	–	0
Moravian	3	–	6	–	0	3	–	7	–	0
Muhlenberg	2	–	7	–	0	1	–	8	–	0
Swarthmore	1	–	7	–	0	0	–	7	–	0
Western Maryland	0	–	5	–	0	3	–	6	–	1
Haverford †	0	–	7	–	0	0	–	0	–	0
x – Division champion/co-champions; * – Ineligible due to insufficient conference games † – Haverford forfeited all games on schedule; opponents received conference victory but overall record not affected.

1972 Midwest Conference football standings
	Conf.					Overall
Team	W		L		T	W		L		T
Monmouth (IL) $	8	–	0	–	0	9	–	0	–	0
Cornell (IA)	6	–	2	–	0	6	–	3	–	0
Knox	5	–	3	–	0	6	–	3	–	0
St. Olaf	5	–	3	–	0	6	–	3	–	0
Ripon	5	–	3	–	0	5	–	3	–	0
Coe	5	–	3	–	0	5	–	4	–	0
Carleton	3	–	5	–	0	3	–	5	–	0
Lawrence	1	–	6	–	1	1	–	6	–	1
Grinnell	1	–	7	–	0	2	–	7	–	0
Beloit	0	–	7	–	1	0	–	8	–	1
$ – Conference champion

1972 Minnesota Intercollegiate Athletic Conference football standings
	Conf.					Overall
Team	W		L		T	W		L		T
Gustavus Adolphus $	6	–	1	–	0	6	–	4	–	0
No. 14 Saint John's (MN)	5	–	2	–	0	7	–	2	–	0
Concordia–Moorhead	4	–	3	–	0	6	–	3	–	0
Minnesota–Duluth	4	–	3	–	0	5	–	4	–	0
St. Thomas (MN)	3	–	4	–	0	6	–	4	–	0
Augsburg	3	–	4	–	0	5	–	4	–	0
Hamline	3	–	4	–	0	5	–	4	–	0
Macalester	0	–	7	–	0	0	–	9	–	0
$ – Conference champion; Rankings from NAIA Division I poll

1972 Missouri Intercollegiate Athletic Association football standings
	Conf.					Overall
Team	W		L		T	W		L		T
Lincoln (MO) +	5	–	1	–	0	9	–	1	–	0
NW Missouri State +	5	–	1	–	0	7	–	3	–	0
SE Missouri State	4	–	2	–	0	5	–	4	–	1
NE Missouri State	2	–	3	–	1	6	–	4	–	1
SW Missouri State	2	–	4	–	0	4	–	6	–	0
Central Missouri State	1	–	4	–	1	3	–	7	–	1
Missouri–Rolla	1	–	5	–	0	2	–	9	–	0
+ – Conference co-champions

1972 New England Football Conference standings
	Conf.					Overall
Team	W		L		T	W		L		T
Maine Maritime $	3	–	1	–	0	5	–	3	–	0
Plymouth State	3	–	1	–	1	4	–	2	–	1
Curry	4	–	2	–	0	5	–	3	–	0
Nichols	3	–	2	–	0	5	–	2	–	1
Bridgewater State	2	–	2	–	0	4	–	5	–	0
Boston State	1	–	3	–	1	1	–	6	–	1
New England College	0	–	5	–	0	0	–	7	–	0
$ – Conference champion

1972 New Jersey State Athletic Conference football standings
	Conf.					Overall
Team	W		L		T	W		L		T
Jersey City State +	4	–	1	–	0	8	–	1	–	0
Glassboro State +	4	–	1	–	0	7	–	2	–	0
Montclair State +	3	–	1	–	0	6	–	4	–	0
Trenton State	2	–	3	–	0	2	–	6	–	1
William Paterson	1	–	4	–	0	2	–	7	–	0
Newark State	0	–	4	–	0	2	–	6	–	0
$ – Conference champion

1972 North Central Conference football standings
	Conf.					Overall
Team	W		L		T	W		L		T
No. T–6 North Dakota +	6	–	1	–	0	10	–	1	–	0
No. T–6 South Dakota +	6	–	1	–	0	9	–	1	–	0
North Dakota State +	6	–	1	–	0	8	–	2	–	0
Mankato State	3	–	4	–	0	6	–	5	–	0
Northern Iowa	3	–	4	–	0	4	–	5	–	0
South Dakota State	2	–	5	–	0	6	–	5	–	0
Morningside	1	–	6	–	0	2	–	8	–	0
Augustana (SD)	1	–	6	–	0	2	–	8	–	0
+ – Conference co-champions; Rankings from AP small college poll

1972 Northern Intercollegiate Conference football standings
	Conf.					Overall
Team	W		L		T	W		L		T
Michigan Tech $	6	–	0	–	0	8	–	1	–	0
Minnesota Morris	5	–	1	–	0	8	–	2	–	0
Moorhead State	4	–	2	–	0	7	–	3	–	0
St. Cloud State	3	–	3	–	0	5	–	5	–	0
Southwest State (MN)	2	–	4	–	0	3	–	7	–	0
Bemidji State	1	–	5	–	0	2	–	7	–	0
Winona State	0	–	6	–	0	2	–	7	–	0
$ – Conference champion

1972 Ohio Athletic Conference football standings
	Conf.					Overall
Team	W		L		T	W		L		T
Blue Division
Muskingum xy	4	–	0	–	0	5	–	5	–	0
Denison	2	–	1	–	1	7	–	1	–	1
Ohio Wesleyan	1	–	2	–	1	3	–	5	–	1
Marietta	1	–	3	–	0	4	–	5	–	0
Otterbein	1	–	3	–	0	2	–	7	–	0
Red Division
Heidelberg xy$	5	–	0	–	0	11	–	0	–	0
Baldwin–Wallace	3	–	2	–	0	7	–	2	–	0
Wittenberg	3	–	2	–	0	5	–	4	–	0
Capital	3	–	2	–	0	4	–	5	–	0
Wooster	1	–	4	–	0	2	–	6	–	0
Mount Union	0	–	5	–	0	1	–	8	–	0
Not competing for championship
Kenyon			–			7	–	0	–	1
Oberlin			–			2	–	7	–	0
Championship: Heidelberg 24, Muskingum 0
$ – Conference champion; x – Division champion/co-champions; y – Championship game participant

1972 Ohio Valley Conference football standings
	Conf.					Overall
Team	W		L		T	W		L		T
No. 8 Tennessee Tech $	7	–	0	–	0	10	–	2	–	0
Western Kentucky	5	–	2	–	0	7	–	3	–	0
Middle Tennessee	4	–	2	–	1	7	–	3	–	1
Morehead State	3	–	3	–	1	3	–	6	–	1
Eastern Kentucky	3	–	4	–	0	5	–	6	–	0
Murray State	2	–	5	–	0	4	–	6	–	0
East Tennessee State	2	–	5	–	0	3	–	7	–	0
Austin Peay	1	–	6	–	0	3	–	8	–	0
$ – Conference champion; Rankings from UPI small college poll

1972 Pennsylvania State Athletic Conference football standings
	Conf.					Overall
Team	W		L		T	W		L		T
East Division
West Chester xy	5	–	0	–	0	7	–	3	–	0
Millersville	4	–	2	–	0	5	–	3	–	1
Bloomsburg	4	–	2	–	0	5	–	5	–	0
Kutztown	3	–	3	–	0	6	–	3	–	0
Cheyney	2	–	3	–	0	6	–	3	–	0
East Stroudsburg	1	–	5	–	0	4	–	5	–	0
Mansfield	1	–	5	–	0	2	–	7	–	0
West Division
No. 18 Slippery Rock xy$	4	–	0	–	1	8	–	2	–	1
Clarion	4	–	1	–	0	6	–	3	–	0
Edinboro	2	–	2	–	1	3	–	5	–	1
Lock Haven	2	–	3	–	0	4	–	5	–	0
Shippensburg	1	–	4	–	0	3	–	6	–	1
California (PA)	1	–	4	–	0	2	–	6	–	0
No. 9 Indiana (PA) *	0	–	0	–	0	8	–	1	–	0
Championship: Slippery Rock 29, West Chester 27
$ – Conference champion; x – Division champion/co-champions; y – Championship game participant; * – Ineligible for conference title; Rankings from NAIA Division I poll

1972 Presidents' Athletic Conference football standings
	Conf.					Overall
Team	W		L		T	W		L		T
Thiel $	6	–	1	–	0	7	–	2	–	0
John Carroll	5	–	2	–	0	7	–	3	–	0
Allegheny	5	–	2	–	0	5	–	4	–	0
Carnegie Mellon	4	–	3	–	0	4	–	5	–	0
Bethany (WV)	3	–	4	–	0	4	–	5	–	0
Case Western Reserve	3	–	4	–	0	4	–	5	–	0
Hiram	2	–	5	–	0	3	–	6	–	0
Washington & Jefferson	0	–	7	–	0	0	–	8	–	1
$ – Conference champion

1972 Southern California Intercollegiate Athletic Conference football standings
	Conf.					Overall
Team	W		L		T	W		L		T
No. 17 Whittier $	5	–	0	–	0	7	–	2	–	1
Redlands	4	–	1	–	0	5	–	5	–	0
La Verne	3	–	2	–	0	6	–	3	–	0
Claremont-Mudd	1	–	4	–	0	3	–	6	–	0
Occidental	1	–	4	–	0	2	–	7	–	0
Pomona-Pitzer	1	–	4	–	0	2	–	7	–	0
$ – Conference champion; Rankings from NAIA Division II poll

1972 Southland Conference football standings
	Conf.					Overall
Team	W		L		T	W		L		T
No. 2 Louisiana Tech $	5	–	0	–	0	12	–	0	–	0
UT Arlington	4	–	1	–	0	5	–	6	–	0
No. T–10 McNeese State	3	–	2	–	0	8	–	3	–	0
Lamar	3	–	2	–	0	8	–	3	–	0
SW Louisiana	1	–	4	–	0	5	–	6	–	0
Arkansas State	1	–	4	–	0	4	–	7	–	0
Abilene Christian	1	–	5	–	0	3	–	8	–	0
$ – Conference champion; Rankings from AP small college poll

1972 Southwestern Athletic Conference football standings
	Conf.					Overall
Team	W		L		T	W		L		T
No. 4 / T–8 Grambling +	5	–	1	–	0	11	–	2	–	0
Jackson State +	5	–	1	–	0	8	–	3	–	0
Alcorn A&M	4	–	1	–	1	5	–	3	–	1
Texas Southern	3	–	2	–	1	5	–	4	–	1
Mississippi Valley State	1	–	5	–	0	5	–	5	–	0
Prairie View A&M	1	–	5	–	0	5	–	5	–	0
Southern	1	–	5	–	0	2	–	7	–	1
+ – Conference co-champions; Rankings from NAIA Division I poll and AP small college poll

1972 Wisconsin State University Conference football standings
	Conf.					Overall
Team	W		L		T	W		L		T
Wisconsin–Oshkosh $	8	–	0	–	0	8	–	2	–	0
No. T–16 Wisconsin–La Crosse	7	–	1	–	0	8	–	2	–	0
Wisconsin–Whitewater	6	–	2	–	0	7	–	3	–	0
Wisconsin–Platteville	4	–	4	–	0	6	–	4	–	0
Wisconsin–River Falls	4	–	4	–	0	4	–	6	–	0
Wisconsin–Eau Claire	2	–	6	–	0	3	–	7	–	0
Wisconsin–Stevens Point	2	–	6	–	0	2	–	8	–	0
Wisconsin–Stout	2	–	6	–	0	2	–	8	–	0
Wisconsin–Superior	1	–	7	–	0	1	–	9	–	0
$ – Conference champion; Rankings from NAIA Division I poll

1972 Yankee Conference football standings
	Conf.					Overall
Team	W		L		T	W		L		T
UMass $	5	–	0	–	0	9	–	2	–	0
Connecticut	4	–	1	–	0	4	–	5	–	0
Vermont	3	–	2	–	0	4	–	5	–	0
New Hampshire	2	–	3	–	0	4	–	5	–	0
Maine	1	–	4	–	0	3	–	6	–	0
Rhode Island	0	–	5	–	0	3	–	7	–	0
$ – Conference champion

1972 NCAA College Division independents football records
	Conf.			Overall
Team	W	L	T	W		L		T
No. 4 Ashland		–		11	–	0	–	0
Bridgeport		–		11	–	0	–	0
No. 1 Delaware		–		10	–	0	–	0
No. 5 Tennessee State		–		11	–	1	–	0
Colorado College		–		8	–	1	–	0
Tampa		–		10	–	2	–	0
Trinity (TX)		–		8	–	2	–	0
Western Carolina		–		7	–	2	–	1
Hawaii		–		8	–	3	–	0
Indiana State		–		7	–	3	–	0
Northeastern		–		6	–	2	–	0
Bucknell		–		6	–	3	–	0
Cortland		–		6	–	3	–	0
San Diego		–		6	–	3	–	1
Arkansas–Pine Bluff		–		4	–	2	–	1
Eastern Michigan		–		6	–	4	–	0
Milwaukee		–		6	–	4	–	0
Samford		–		5	–	3	–	2
Lake Forest		–		4	–	3	–	1
Nevada		–		6	–	5	–	0
Central Michigan		–		5	–	5	–	1
Rose-Hulman		–		5	–	5	–	0
Santa Clara		–		4	–	4	–	1
Akron		–		3	–	4	–	2
St. Norbert		–		4	–	5	–	0
Saint Mary's		–		3	–	4	–	0
Kentucky State		–		4	–	6	–	0
Drexel		–		3	–	6	–	0
Northeast Louisiana		–		3	–	7	–	0
Portland State		–		3	–	8	–	0
Wayne State (MI)		–		2	–	5	–	1
Boston University		–		2	–	8	–	0
Northern Michigan		–		2	–	8	–	0
Saint Peter's		–		2	–	8	–	0
Chattanooga		–		2	–	9	–	0
Southern Illinois		–		1	–	8	–	1
Eastern Illinois		–		1	–	9	–	0
Madison		–		0	–	4	–	1
UNLV		–		1	–	10	–	0
Rankings from AP small college poll

== Rankings ==
College Division teams (also referred to as "small college") were ranked in polls by the AP (a panel of writers) and by UPI (coaches). The national champion(s) for each season were determined by the final poll rankings, published at or near the end of the regular season, before any bowl games were played.

=== Small college polls ===
Both the UPI and AP panels ranked Delaware (10–0) first, followed by Louisiana Tech (11–0), and Cal Poly (8–0–1). Louisiana Tech later defeated Tennessee Tech in the Grantland Rice Bowl, while Cal Poly lost to North Dakota in the Camellia Bowl. Delaware declined an invitation to face UMass (7–2) in the Boardwalk Bowl, and did not play in the postseason.

United Press International (coaches) final poll
Published on November 22

Rank	School	Record	No. 1 votes	Total points
1	Delaware	10–0	21	334
2	Louisiana Tech	11–0	12	310
3	Cal Poly	8–0–1	1	239
4	South Dakota	9–1	1	193
5	Tennessee State	9–1		184
6	North Dakota	9–1		148
7	Ashland	11–0		104
8	Tennessee Tech	10–1		98
9	Grambling	8–2		68
10	Carson–Newman	9–1		46

Associated Press (writers) final poll
Published on November 23

Rank	School	Record	No. 1 votes	Total points
1	Delaware	10–0	9	272
2	Louisiana Tech	11–0	4	237
3	Cal Poly	8–0–1		197
4	Ashland	11–0	1	195
5	Tennessee State	8–1^{note1}		164
T6	South Dakota	9–1	1	144
T6	North Dakota	9–1		144
T8	Grambling	8–2		76
T8	Western Carolina	7–2–1		76
T10	Carson–Newman	9–1		55
T10	McNeese State	8–2		55

^note1 Tennessee State actually 9–1 when the poll was taken.

== Bowl games ==
The postseason consisted of four bowl games as regional finals, all played on December 10.

Bowl	Region	Location	Winning team		Losing team		Ref
Boardwalk	East	Atlantic City, New Jersey	UMass	35	UC Davis	14	
Grantland Rice	Mideast	Baton Rouge, Louisiana	Louisiana Tech	35	Tennessee Tech	0	
Pioneer	Midwest	Wichita Falls, Texas	Tennessee State	29	Drake	7	
Camellia	West	Sacramento, California	North Dakota	38	Cal Poly	21	

=== Black college national championship ===
Grambling defeated North Carolina Central in the inaugural Pelican Bowl to capture the black college football national championship.

== See also ==
- 1972 NCAA University Division football season
- 1972 NAIA Division I football season
- 1972 NAIA Division II football season
