= 1973 Florence State Lions football team =

American college football season

1973 Florence State Lions football
- Conference: Gulf South Conference
- Record: 4–6 (3–6 GSC)
- Head coach: Mickey Andrews (1st season)
- Offensive coordinator: Richie Gaskell (1st season)
- Defensive coordinator: Mike Dean (1st season)
- Home stadium: Braly Municipal Stadium

1973 Gulf South Conference football standings
	Conf.					Overall
Team	W		L		T	W		L		T
No. T–17 Troy State $	6	–	1	–	0	7	–	2	–	1
No. 4 Jacksonville State	5	–	2	–	0	7	–	2	–	0
Delta State	6	–	3	–	0	8	–	3	–	0
Livingston	4	–	3	–	1	6	–	3	–	1
Northwestern State	3	–	4	–	0	5	–	6	–	0
Mississippi College	3	–	4	–	0	4	–	6	–	0
Southeastern Louisiana	3	–	4	–	0	4	–	6	–	0
Florence State	3	–	6	–	0	4	–	6	–	0
Nicholls State	2	–	7	–	0	2	–	9	–	0
Tennessee–Martin	1	–	5	–	1	2	–	8	–	1
$ – Conference champion; Rankings from NAIA Division I poll

The 1973 Florence State Lions football team represented Florence State University as a member of the Gulf South Conference (GSC) during the 1973 NAIA Division I football season. Led by first-year head coach Mickey Andrews, the Lions compiled an overall record of 4–6 with a mark of 3–6 in conference play, tying for seventh place in the GSC. Florence State played home game at Braly Municipal Stadium in Florence, Alabama.

== Schedule ==
Date	Time	Opponent	Site	Result	Attendance	Source
September 8	7:30 p.m.	at Southeastern Louisiana	Strawberry Stadium; Hammond, LA	L 0–26	7,000	
September 22	7:30 p.m.	Delta State	Braly Municipal Stadium; Florence, AL	W 21–18	5,500	
September 29	7:30 p.m.	Livingston	Braly Municipal Stadium; Florence, AL (rivalry)	W 13–12	6,200	
October 6	2:00 p.m.	Mississippi College^{†}	Braly Municipal Stadium; Florence, AL	L 7–26	8,200	
October 13	7:30 p.m.	at Northwestern State	Demon Stadium; Natchitoches, LA	L 14-27	6,000	
October 20	2:00 p.m.	at Troy State	Veterans Memorial Stadium; Troy, AL	L 7–36	8,300	
October 27	7:30 p.m.	at Nicholls State	John L. Guidry Stadium; Natchitoches, LA	W 27–11	6,500	
November 3	7:30 p.m.	Appalachian State*	Braly Municipal Stadium; Florence, AL	W 21–7	5,500	
November 10	2:00 p.m.	at Tennessee–Martin	Pacer Stadium; Martin, TN	L 16–17	7,100	
November 17	7:30 p.m.	Jacksonville State	Braly Municipal Stadium; Florence, AL	L 12–42	6,500	
*Non-conference game; ^{†}Homecoming

== Offseason ==
=== Coaching changes ===
Preparation for the 1973 season began before the 1972 season concluded. Durell Mock, who had led the Lions to a 3–24 record in three seasons, announced that he would resign from the head coach position after the final game of the season at Jacksonville State. With the resignation, the search for a new head coach began. Unofficial reports suggested that four coaches had been chosen for final consideration. The list of coaches was made up of Southern Miss assistant coach Hamp Cook, Georgia assistant coach Byrd Whigham, and Auburn assistant coach Sam Mitchell. But, it would be the fourth man on the list who got the job: Mickey Andrews.

Andrews, who had previously been coaching at Florence State rival Livingston, was announced as the new head coach and athletic director on November 30. In his three years at Livingston, he coached the Tigers to a NAIA National Championship and a Gulf South Conference championship in 1971. He also played defensive back for the Alabama Crimson Tide from 1962 to 1964.

Andrews brought forth multiple changes during the offseason. He brought previous members of his coaching staff at Livingston to join him in Florence. Mike Dean, who Andrews had brought on to Livingston to become a defensive coach, was selected as defensive coordinator. Richie Gaskell, who had been head coach at Carson-Newman before joining Andrews' coaching staff, joined on as the new offensive coordinator.

=== Spring practice ===
Andrews and his new coaching staff quickly became dissatisfied with the state of the team. After the first spring practice, Andrews said in an interview, "We're about as far away from being a football team as any group I've ever seen on the first day of spring practice. The best thing we had was effort." During the remaining spring practice sessions, the amount of players would drop from the initial seventy to only thirty-four remaining. This along with the record amount of freshman joining the team led to a very young Florence State Lions football team in 1973.

=== New stadium proposal ===
Off the gridiron, plans for a new stadium for the Lions were being drafted. Despite playing in Braly Stadium since 1949, it seemed that the Lions had outgrown the stadium. With the recent move to the Gulf South Conference and the construction of Flowers Hall, it seemed that Florence State athletics was about to grow. Along with this, issues were beginning to arise about sharing Braly with high school teams. There were several instances in the previous years where both Coffee High School and Bradshaw High School would play on Thursday and Friday and then, the Lions would play on Saturday. This would create poor field conditions by the time Florence State took the field on Saturday night.

With these sentiments, the FSU Alumni Association led by Harlon Hill began to create plans and fundraise for the stadium. By May, the proposal would gain support from the city and optimism for the stadium was high. The proposed stadium would be built west of the Florence State campus and have a capacity of 20,000. The stadium would also have artificial turf. With the optimism, it was believed that the stadium would break ground in 1974. However, it would not. It would be fifty years later in 2024 when the university broke ground on Braly's replacement, Bank Independent Stadium.

== Roster ==
1973 North Alabama Lions football team roster
Players
Coaches
Offense

Pos.	#	Name	Class
C		John Anderson	Fr
OT		Tony Ayah	So
WR		Richard Bagwell	Fr
OT		Harry Bowman	Jr
OT		Hal Breffle	Fr
HB		Cornelius Brown	Fr
TE		Dale Courington	Fr
C		Paul Daniel	Fr
HB		Raymond Dew	Fr
G		Bob Dorcheck	Fr
OT		David Doverspike	Fr
FB		Jim Durden	Fr
C		Jerry Elkins	Fr
QB		Danny Everett	Fr
QB		Roger Ferrell	So
SE		Tony Gandy	Fr
QB		Bobby Gauntney	Fr
TE		Steve Grefseng	So
G		Tim Harden	Fr
OT		Wendall Hawthorn	Sr
G		Jerry Hodges	Fr
OT		Brad Holden	Fr
HB		Marvin Jarman	Fr
G		Barry Johnson	So
SE		Danny Kimble	Sr
QB		Larry Klatt	Fr
SE		Mike Knight	So
OT		Barry Kohen	So
WR		Lonnie Luckerson	Fr
FB		Carlos Mejia	Fr
QB		Nick Martilli	Fr
G		Bob McConnell	Fr
HB		Bill McGlincy	So
HB		Tony McMinn	So
OT		Rolando Medrano	Fr
QB		Chuck Medders	Fr
WR		Mark Merritt	Fr
G		Greg Miller	Fr
FB		Jerry Mizell	So
HB		Terry Mizell	Jr
G		Andy Morris	So
HB		Larry Parker	Fr
OT		Ben Parrish	Fr
C		Paul Parvin	Jr
G		Jim Pillow	Fr
HB		Steve Pope	Fr
HB		Jeff Porterfield	Fr
G		David Pruitt	Fr
FL		Roger Ralph	So
QB		Lee Robbs	Fr
HB		Greg Rorex	Fr
TE		Keith Bryant	So
G		Ewing Sellers	Fr
HB		Kiney Sexton	Fr
C		Mike Sheehan	Fr
QB		Mike Shipp	Fr
C		Larry Short	Fr
FB		Norman Simms	Fr
WR		Ricky Smith	Fr
OT		David Stallcup	Fr
TE		William Steffey	Fr
G		Troy Underwood	Fr
QB		Raymond Weaver	Jr
HB		Ricky Yates	Fr
G		Ted Yoho	Fr
OT		Tony Yoho	So

Defense

Pos.	#	Name	Class
LB		Calvin Bacon	Fr
DT		Tommy Baker	Fr
DT		Joe Bowman	Fr
LB		Maurice Browley	Fr
DT		Larry Brown	Jr
DB		Eddie Burns	Fr
DB		John Calvert	Fr
DE		James Crawford	Fr
DB		Robert Crouch	Fr
LB		Frank Deliz	Fr
DB		Curtis Dixon	Fr
DT		Jud Driver	Fr
DB		Jim Ezell	So
DE		Danny Fromhold	Fr
DT		Joe Gabr	Fr
DB		Bruce Gentle	Fr
DB		Marty Gentle	Fr
DB		Terry Hanks	Fr
S		Billy Hargrove	Sr
DB		Robbie Hudson	So
DB		Larry Jefferys	Jr
DE		Jerome Jeffries	Fr
DT		Paul Jenkins	Fr
DB		Marty Johnson	Fr
OT		Charlie Kennedy	So
LB		James Laggis	Fr
LB		Curtis Lowery	Fr
DT		Sparks Luncheford	Fr
DB		Clayton Lundy	Fr
DB		Mike McCombs	Fr
DE		Spry Mitchell	Sr
DE		Mike Murray	Fr
DB		Mike Petty	Fr
LB		Ivan Richard	So
DT		Stan Romine	Fr
DT		Tim Searchy	Fr
DE		Tobin Sexton	Fr
LB		Elwin Smith	Fr
LB		Lawrence Stephens	Fr
LB		Steve Stewart	So
LB		Bill Strain	Jr
DT		Frank Strickland	Fr
DB		James Sullivan	Fr
LB		Ricky Swords	Fr
DT		John Trotter	Jr
DB		Terry Wray	Fr
LB		A.C. Wright	Fr
LB		Wade Yates	Fr

Special teams

Pos.	#	Name	Class
P		Dale Mathis	Sr
K		Mark Turner	Fr

Head coach

- Mickey Andrews

Coordinators/assistant coaches

- Richie Gaskell – Offensive coordinator
- Mike Dean – Defensive coordinator
- Wally Burnham – Offensive line coach
- Bob Herring – Defensive line coach

Legend

- (C) Team captain
- (S) Suspended
- (I) Ineligible
- Injured
- Redshirt
