= 1975 North Alabama Lions football team =

American college football season

1975 North Alabama Lions football
- Conference: Gulf South Conference
- Record: 6–4 (4–4 GSC)
- Head coach: Mickey Andrews (3rd season)
- Offensive coordinator: Richie Gaskell (3rd season)
- Defensive coordinator: Mike Dean (3rd season)
- Captains: Barry Koehn; Jerry Mizell; Roger Ralph
- Home stadium: Braly Municipal Stadium

1975 Gulf South Conference football standings
	Conf.					Overall
Team	W		L		T	W		L		T
Nicholls State $	7	–	2	–	0	8	–	2	–	0
No. 6 Livingston ^	6	–	2	–	0	10	–	3	–	0
No. 11 Jacksonville State	5	–	3	–	0	7	–	3	–	0
Troy State	5	–	3	–	0	6	–	4	–	0
Delta State	5	–	4	–	0	6	–	4	–	0
North Alabama	4	–	4	–	0	6	–	4	–	0
Mississippi College	2	–	5	–	0	6	–	5	–	0
Southeastern Louisiana	2	–	6	–	0	4	–	7	–	0
Tennessee–Martin	1	–	7	–	0	2	–	8	–	0
$ – Conference champion; ^ – NCAA Division II playoff participant; Rankings from NCAA Division II AP poll for Livingston and NAIA Division I poll for Jacksonville State

The 1975 North Alabama Lions football team represented the University of North Alabama as a member of the Gulf South Conference (GSC) during the 1975 NAIA Division I football season. Led by third-year head coach Mickey Andrews, the Lions compiled an overall record of 6–4 with a mark of 4–4 in conference play, finishing sixth in the GSC. North Alabama played home games at Braly Municipal Stadium in Florence, Alabama.

== Schedule ==
Date	Opponent	Site	Result	Attendance	Source
September 13	at Southeastern Louisiana	Strawberry Stadium; Hammond, LA	L 15–28	8,300	
September 13	Livingston	Braly Municipal Stadium; Florence, AL (rivalry)	L 7–14	7,500	
October 4	Delta State^{†}	Braly Municipal Stadium; Florence, AL	L 9–21	7,500	
October 11	at Alabama A&M*	Milton Frank Stadium; Huntsville, AL	W 48–29	6,800	
October 18	Austin Peay*	Braly Municipal Stadium; Florence, AL	W 23–6	3,000	
October 25	at Troy State	Veterans Memorial Stadium; Troy, AL	W 49–26	9,000	
November 1	Mississippi College	Braly Municipal Stadium; Florence, AL	W 41–14	4,000	
November 8	at Nicholls State	John L. Guidry Stadium; Thibodaux, LA	L 28–27	7,500	
November 15	at Tennessee–Martin	Pacer Stadium; Martin, TN	W 30–20	5,000	
November 22	Jacksonville State	Braly Municipal Stadium; Florence, AL	W 21–14	5,000	
*Non-conference game; ^{†}Homecoming

== Offseason ==
=== Spring Game ===
The annual spring intrasquad matchup took place on Tuesday, April 1, at Braly Stadium. The game saw the team split into both Gold and Purple squads. The Golds, led by Steve Clark and Jerry Mizell, defeated the Purples 26-21.

The game also saw honorary head coaches for both teams: Miss UNA Susie Vaughan for the Purple team and Miss Alabama Pam Long for the Gold team.

=== GSC Summer Meeting ===
From June 12th to 15th, the Gulf South Conference summer meeting was held in Birmingham, Alabama. During the meeting, several topics were discussed. Due to multiple schools in the league holding dual membership in both the NCAA and NAIA, a recommendation was brought forward that any school must accept an invitation to any NCAA postseason tourney. The NCAA Division II-only schools of the league brought forth the idea to create a committee to look at the possibility of moving the conference up to Division I.

Other decisions made during the meeting were to forbid exchanging football film with non-conference teams and to reduce football rosters from 55 to 50 players.

=== Conference Realignment ===
On July 4th, it was announced that Northwestern State would leave the GSC to join the Southland Conference. The school listed poor attendance for conference games and the proposed plan to reduce Division II scholarship limits from 70 to 55. They believed this would give nearby Division I schools a recruiting advantage.

=== Preseason conference poll ===
The Gulf South Conference released its preseason coaches' poll on August 3. The poll still includes Northwestern State despite its departure from the conference in July.

GSC coaches' poll
Predicted finish	Team	Votes (1st place)
1	Jacksonville State	87 (7)
2	Southeastern Louisiana	70 (1)
3	Delta State	56
	Livingston	56
5	Troy State	55 (1)
6	North Alabama	44
7	Nicholls State	37
8	Northwestern State	21
9	Mississippi College	17
	Tennessee-Martin	17

=== Recruiting ===
Signees

Name	Pos.	Hometown	High School
Weldon Abercrombie	DG	Robertsdale, AL	Robertsdale High School
Danny Beeler	TE	Knoxville, TN	Knox Central High School
Eddie Blankenship	SE	Pompano Beach, FL	Pompano Beach High School
Bruce D. Childs	OG	Birmingham, AL	Huffman High School
Phillip Connell	DE	Dunwoody, GA	North Springs High School
Reginald Green	OT	Birmingham, AL	Woodlawn High School
Harry Grimes	LB	Tuscumbia, AL	Deshler High School
Marty Hanson	DB	Addison, AL	Addison High School
Brad Hendrix	DE	Birmingham, AL	Woodlawn High School
Mark Holmes	FB	Birmingham, AL	Berry High School
Billy Hudson	DT	Muscle Shoals, AL	Muscle Shoals High School
Marvin Jackson	FB	Millbrook, AL	Stanhope Elmore High School
Mark Kreider	QB	Birmingham, AL	West End High School
Chuck Lane	OT	Decatur, AL	Decatur High School
Hugh Martin	DT	Brilliant, AL	Brilliant School
Ronald Moon	RB	Commerce, GA	Commerce High School
Rusty Prater	DB	Florence, AL	Coffee High School
Howard Ross	LB	Birmingham, AL	Woodlawn High School
Terry Stooksberry	RB	Florence, AL	Bradshaw High School
Albert Walker	DE	Decatur, AL	Decatur High School
David Waller	OG	Huntsville, AL	Johnson High School
Ricky Wheeler	QB	Nashville, TN	Glencliff High School
Tim White	DE	Robertsdale, AL	Robertsdale High School
Johnny Williams	DE	Holt, AL	Holt High School

== Roster ==
1975 North Alabama Lions football team roster
Players
Coaches
Offense

Pos.	#	Name	Class
G		Weldon Abercrombie	Fr
TE		Danny Beeler	Fr
SE		Eddie Blankenship	Fr
RB		Maurice Brawley	So
G		Bruce Childs	Fr
QB		Steve Clark	So
SE		John Cochran	Fr
C		Jerry Davis	Fr
C		Louie Davis	So
SE		Curtis Dixon	Jr
QB		Garner Ezell	Fr
C		Joe Fry	Fr
SE		Will Fuller	Sr
FB		Bimbo Fuson	So
OT		Reginald Green	Fr
OT		Tim Harden	Jr
G		Benjamin Hawks	Jr
QB		Frank Higginbotham	Fr
FB		Mark Holmes	Fr
C		Billy Hudson	Fr
OT		Barry Johnson	Sr
G		Barry Koehn	Sr
QB		Mark Kreider	Fr
G		Chuck Lane	Fr
TE		Bob Martin	So
RB		Marc Merritt	Jr
FB		Jerry Mizell	Sr
OT		Andy Morris	Jr
RB		Melvin Pointer	Fr
FL		Roger Ralph	Sr
RB		Burnis Rose	Jr
TE		Mike Shipp	Jr
TE		Myles Smith	So
FL		Ricky Smith	Jr
FL		Robert Steele	So
SE		Terry Stooksberry	Fr
G		David Waller	Fr
QB		Ricky Wheeler	Fr
G		Terry Witherspoon	So

Defense

Pos.	#	Name	Class
LB		Mike Allison	So
DT		Steve Bridges	Jr
DE		John Byrd	So
DB		Rodney Bivens	So
DE		John Connell	Sr
LB		Phillip Connell	Fr
DE		James Crawford	Jr
DB		Steve Davis	So
DE		Frank Deliz	Jr
DB		Jim Ezell	Sr
DB		Bubba Gibson	So
LB		Harry Grimes	Fr
LB		Frankie Hammock	So
DB		Marty Hanson	Fr
DE		Robert Harris	Sr
DE		Brad Hendrix	Fr
DB		Robbie Hudson	Sr
LB		Marvin Jackson	Fr
DB		Clayton Lundy	Jr
DT		Hugh Martin	Fr
DB		Mike McCombs	Jr
DT		Mike Murray	Jr
DB		Donald Pearson	So
DB		Rusty Prater	Fr
LB		Ivan Richard	Sr
LB		Howard Ross	Fr
DE		Tobin Sexton	Jr
LB		Norman Sims	Jr
LB		Steve Stewart	Sr
DT		Willie Taylor	So
DE		Albert Walker	Fr
DB		Collins Warren	So
DE		Tim White	Fr
DT		Johnny Williams	Fr

Special teams

Pos.	#	Name	Class
K		David Atkins	Fr
P		Aubrey Haynes	Jr

Head coach

- Mickey Andrews

Coordinators/assistant coaches

- Richie Gaskell – Offensive coordinator
- Mike Dean – Defensive coordinator
- Wally Burnham – Offensive line coach
- Jim Blair – Defensive line coach
- Andy White – Linebacker coach
- Tommy Jones – Wide receiver coach
- Johnny Long – Trainer

Legend

- (C) Team captain
- (S) Suspended
- (I) Ineligible
- Injured
- Redshirt

== Awards ==
=== Honors ===
Weekly Honors
Player	Award	Ref.
Mike Allison	GSC Defensive Player of the Week (Week One)	
Rodney Bivens	GSC Defensive Player of the Week (Week Eight)	
Burnis Rose	GSC Co-Offensive Player of the Week (Week Nine)	
Marc Merritt	GSC Offensive Player of the Week (Week Ten)	
Ivan Richard	GSC Defensive Player of the Week (Week Eleven)	

Yearly Honors
Player	Award	Ref.
Roger Ralph	All-American; GSC Offensive Player of the Year; All-GSC First Team - Offense	
Terence Witherspoon	All-GSC First Team - Offense	
Jerry Mizell	All-GSC Second Team - Offense	
Barry Johnson	All-GSC Second Team - Offense	
Norman Sims	All-GSC Second Team - Defense	
