= 1975 Nicholls State Colonels football team =

American college football season

1975 Nicholls State Colonels football

GSC champion
- Conference: Gulf South Conference
- Record: 8–2 (7–2 GSC)
- Head coach: Bill Clements (2nd season)
- Home stadium: John L. Guidry Stadium

1975 Gulf South Conference football standings
	Conf.					Overall
Team	W		L		T	W		L		T
Nicholls State $	7	–	2	–	0	8	–	2	–	0
No. 6 Livingston ^	6	–	2	–	0	10	–	3	–	0
No. 11 Jacksonville State	5	–	3	–	0	7	–	3	–	0
Troy State	5	–	3	–	0	6	–	4	–	0
Delta State	5	–	4	–	0	6	–	4	–	0
North Alabama	4	–	4	–	0	6	–	4	–	0
Mississippi College	2	–	5	–	0	6	–	5	–	0
Southeastern Louisiana	2	–	6	–	0	4	–	7	–	0
Tennessee–Martin	1	–	7	–	0	2	–	8	–	0
$ – Conference champion; ^ – NCAA Division II playoff participant; Rankings from NCAA Division II AP poll for Livingston and NAIA Division I poll for Jacksonville State

The 1975 Nicholls State Colonels football team represented Nicholls State University as a member of the Gulf South Conference (GSC) the 1975 NCAA Division II football season. Led by second-year head coach Bill Clements, the Colonels compiled an overall record of 8–2 with a conference mark of 7–2, winning the GSC title. Nicholls State played home games at John L. Guidry Stadium in John L. Guidry Stadium.

== Schedule ==
Date	Opponent	Site	Result	Attendance	Source
September 13	Tennessee–Martin	John L. Guidry Stadium; Thibodaux, LA	W 23–0	9,000	
September 20	Jacksonville State	John L. Guidry Stadium; Thibodaux, LA	W 18–6	8,500	
September 27	at Troy State	Veterans Memorial Stadium; Troy, AL	W 17–13	5,000	
October 4	at Southeast Missouri State*	Houck Stadium; Cape Girardeau, MO	W 18–17	5,000	
October 11	Northwestern State	John L. Guidry Stadium; Thibodaux, LA (rivalry)	W 23–10	11,000	
October 25	at Mississippi College	Robinson Hale Stadium; Clinton, MS	L 7–19	5,000	
November 1	at Livingston	Tiger Stadium; Livingston, AL	L 7–13	4,800	
November 8	North Alabama	John L. Guidry Stadium; Thibodaux, LA	W 28–27	7,500	
November 15	vs. Southeastern Louisiana	Louisiana Superdome; New Orleans, LA (rivalry)	W 14–6	20,000	
November 22	Delta State	John L. Guidry Stadium; Thibodaux, LA	W 24–21	7,000	
*Non-conference game; Source:
