= 1974 North Alabama Lions football team =

American college football season

1974 North Alabama Lions football
- Conference: Gulf South Conference
- Record: 4–6 (4–4 GSC)
- Head coach: Mickey Andrews (2nd season)
- Offensive coordinator: Richie Gaskell (2nd season)
- Defensive coordinator: Mike Dean (2nd season)
- Captains: Paul Parvin; Tony McMinn; Larry Jeffreys
- Home stadium: Braly Municipal Stadium

1974 Gulf South Conference football standings
	Conf.					Overall
Team	W		L		T	W		L		T
No. 7 Jacksonville State $	7	–	1	–	0	7	–	4	–	0
Delta State	7	–	2	–	0	8	–	3	–	0
No. 8 Livingston	5	–	3	–	0	8	–	3	–	0
Southeastern Louisiana	5	–	3	–	0	6	–	4	–	0
Troy State	4	–	4	–	0	6	–	4	–	0
North Alabama	4	–	4	–	0	4	–	6	–	0
Nicholls State	4	–	5	–	0	5	–	6	–	0
Northwestern State	1	–	6	–	0	1	–	10	–	0
Tennessee–Martin	1	–	7	–	0	2	–	9	–	0
Mississippi College	0	–	7	–	0	2	–	9	–	0
$ – Conference champion; Rankings from NAIA Division I poll

The 1974 North Alabama Lions football team represented the University of North Alabama as a member of the Gulf South Conference (GSC) during the 1974 NAIA Division I football season. Led by second-year head coach Mickey Andrews, the Lions compiled an overall record of 4–6 with a mark of 4–4 in conference play, tying for fifth place in the GSC. North Alabama played home game at Braly Municipal Stadium in Florence, Alabama.

== Schedule ==
Date	Time	Opponent	Site	Result	Attendance	Source
September 14	7:30 p.m.	Southeastern Louisiana	Braly Municipal Stadium; Florence, AL	L 17–21	8,300	
September 21	7:30 p.m.	at Livingston	Tiger Stadium; Livingston, AL (rivalry)	L 16–28	3,000	
October 5	7:30 p.m.	at Delta State	Delta Field; Cleveland, MS	L 10–26	6,500	
October 12	7:30 p.m.	at Western Carolina*	Whitmire Stadium; Cullowhee, NC	L 7–32	6,500	
October 19	7:30 p.m.	at Austin Peay*	Municipal Stadium; Clarksville, TN	L 14–20	5,400	
October 26	2:00 p.m.	Troy State^{†}	Braly Municipal Stadium; Florence, AL	L 29–36	8,200–8,300	
November 2	7:00 p.m.	at Mississippi College	Robinson Stadium; Clinton, MS	W 30–23	4,500	
November 9	7:30 p.m.	Nicholls State	Braly Municipal Stadium; Florence, AL	W 17–8	6,000–7,000	
November 16	7:30 p.m.	Tennessee–Martin	Braly Municipal Stadium; Florence, AL	W 42–10	3,000	
November 23	2:00 p.m.	Jacksonville State	Paul Snow Memorial Stadium; Jacksonville, AL	W 28–24	5,000–5,500	
*Non-conference game; ^{†}Homecoming

== Offseason ==
=== Name change ===
Despite little change on the football end of things, Florence State University would undergo a big change. On December 27, 1973, the Board of Trustees voted to change the name to University of North Alabama. This change would come into effect on August 15, just one month before the beginning of the football season.

The reasons stated for the change include broader support and greater visibility for the university. Also included was the potential confusion between Florence State University and Florida State University as they both shared the abbrivation of "FSU."

=== Preseason conference poll ===
The Gulf South Conference released their preseason coaches' poll on August 3. North Alabama were picked to finish seventh.

=== Transfers ===
Transfers In

Name	Pos.	Hometown	Transfer from
Creig Bell	TE	Addison, AL	Southern Mississippi
Robert Harris	DE	Springville, AL	Samford
Randy Lee	QB	Addison, AL	Samford
Kelly Pool	LB	Lanette, AL	Samford
Burnis Rose	RB	Leeds, AL	Samford

=== Recruiting ===
Signees

Name	Pos.	Hometown	High School
Mike Allison	FB	Birmingham, AL	Woodlawn High School
David Atkins	K	Guin, AL	Marion County High School
Ricky Baker	OT	Thomaston, GA	Thomaston High School
Rodney Bivens	CB	Birmingham, AL	Minor High School
Steve Clark	QB	Birmingham, AL	Shades Valley High School
Jerry Davis	C	Athens, AL	Athens High School
Louie Davis	OG	Huntsville, AL	Butler High School
Stan Debord	DT	Lafayette, GA	Lafayette High School
Butch Garrison	DE	Birmingham, AL	Jones Valley High School
Tony Hendon	DB	Birmingham, AL	West End High School
Frank Higginbotham	DB	Trussville, AL	Hewitt High School
Rocky Jacobs	LB	Northport, AL	Tuscaloosa County High School
Billy King	LB	Hueytown, AL	Hueytown High School
Ricky Kirkpatrick	OT	Russellville, AL	Russellville High School
Fred Mahler	DE	Nashville, TN	Father Ryan High School
Bob Martin	TE	Birmingham, AL	Banks High School
Mark Neuhauser	LB	Demopolis, AL	Demopolis High School
Donald Pearson	TE	Birmingham, AL	West End High School
Billy Reynolds	FB	Huntsville, AL	Butler High School
Fred Rosenblum	DB	Huntsville, AL	Huntsville High School
David Seymour	WR	Decatur, AL	Decatur High School
Myles Smith	TE	Birmingham, AL	West End High School
Robert Steele	TE	Columbus, GA	Hardaway High School
James Tanniehill	RB	Silura, AL	Thompson High School
Willie Taylor	DT	Birmingham, AL	Ensley High School
Lawrence Versa	RB	Athens, TN	Athens High School
John Wall	DT	Milledgeville, GA	Milledge Academy
Terence Witherspoon	DT	Fairfield, AL	Fairfield High School

== Game summaries ==
=== vs. Southeastern Louisiana ===
Game One – North Alabama Lions vs. Southeastern Louisiana Lions – Game summary

Quarter	1	2	3	4	Total
Southeastern Louisiana	0	6	8	7	21
North Alabama	8	3	0	6	17

at Braly Municipal Stadium • Florence, Alabama

- Date: September 14
- Game time: 7:30 p.m. CDT
- Game attendance: 8,300

Game information

First quarter

- UNA – Roger Ralph 8-yard pass from Roger Ferrell (Mike Allison pass from Roger Ferrell) (UNA 8-0)

Second quarter

- SLU – Jay Daniel 7-yard pass (2-point conversion no-good) (UNA 8-6)
- UNA – Creig Bell 24-yard field goal (UNA 11-6)

Third quarter

- SLU – Horace Belton 2-yard rush (Jay Daniel rush) (SLU 14-11)

Fourth quarter

- SLU – Horace Belton 3-yard rush (Saia kick) (SLU 21-11)
- UNA – Clayton Lundy 80-yard punt return (Kick no good) (SLU 21-17)

Statistics	UNA	SLU
First downs	12	19
Total yards	227	342
Rushing yards	132	280
Passing yards	95	62
Passing: Comp–Att–Int	7-20-1	5-12-0
Punts	6-35.6	4-39.2
Fumbles/Lost	2-0	3-2
Penalties	4-46	5-27

== Roster ==
1974 North Alabama Lions football team roster
Players
Coaches
Offense

Pos.	#	Name	Class
FB		Mike Allison	Fr
WR		Frankie Amos	Fr
WR		Richard Bagwell	So
OT		Ricky Baker	Fr
TE		Creig Bell	So
C		Richard Bowers	Jr
RB		Maurice Brawley	Fr
QB		Steve Clark	Fr
C		Jerry Davis	Fr
G		Louie Davis	Fr
QB		Roger Ferrell	Jr
OT		Tim Harden	So
G		Ben Hawks	So
RB		Marvin Jarman	So
OT		Barry Johnson	Jr
WR		Charlie Kennedy	So
OT		Ricky Kirkpatrick	So
WR		Mike Knight	Jr
OT		Barry Koehn	Jr
QB		Randy Lee	So
TE		Bob Martin	Fr
QB		Nick Martelli	Fr
FB		Tony McMinn (C)	Sr
RB		Marc Merritt	So
FB		Jerry Mizell	Jr
RB		Terry Mizell	Jr
C		Joe Moore	Fr
G		Andy Morris	Jr
TE		John Musick	So
G		Paul Parvin (C)	Sr
TE		Donald Pearson	Fr
RB		James Pointer	Fr
WR		Roger Ralph	Jr
FB		Billy Reynolds	Fr
RB		Burnis Rose	So
WR		David Seymour	Fr
QB		Mike Shipp	So
TE		Myles Smith	Fr
WR		Ricky Smith	Fr
TE		Robert Steele	Fr
G		Frank Strickland	So
RB		James Tanniehill	Fr
RB		Lawrence Versa	Fr
RB		Sandy Vinson	Fr

Defense

Pos.	#	Name	Class
DB		Rodney Bivens	Fr
DB		Eddy Burns	So
DT		Buddy Childs	So
DE		James Crawford	Fr
LB		John Connell	Jr
DT		Stan Debord	Fr
DE		Frank Deliz	So
DB		Curtis Dixon	So
DT		Jud Driver	So
DB		Jim Ezell	Jr
DE		Butch Garrison	Fr
LB		Frankie Hammock	Fr
LB		Tom Hardy	Fr
DE		Robert Harris	So
DB		Tony Hendon	Fr
DB		Frank Higginbotham	Fr
DB		Robbie Hudson	Jr
LB		Rocky Jacobs	Fr
DB		Larry Jeffreys (C)	Sr
LB		Billy King	Fr
LB		Bill Loden	So
DE		Sparks Lunceford	So
DB		Clayton Lundy	So
DE		Fred Mahler	Fr
DB		Mike McCombs	So
DT		Mike Murray	So
LB		Mark Neuhauser	Fr
DB		Mike Petty	Fr
LB		Kelly Pool	Jr
LB		Ivan Richards	Jr
DB		Fred Rosenblum	Fr
DE		Tobin Sexton	So
LB		Norman Simms	So
DE		David Stalcup	So
LB		Lawrence Stephens	So
LB		Steve Stewart	Jr
DB		Randy Stokes	Fr
DB		Jimmy Sullivan	Fr
DT		Willie Taylor	Fr
DT		John Wall	Fr
DB		Abe Washington	Fr
DT		Terence Witherspoon	Fr
DB		Terry Wray	Fr

Special teams

Pos.	#	Name	Class
K		David Atkins	Fr

Head coach

- Mickey Andrews

Coordinators/assistant coaches

- Richie Gaskell – Offensive coordinator
- Mike Dean – Defensive coordinator
- Wally Burnham – Offensive line coach

Legend

- (C) Team captain
- (S) Suspended
- (I) Ineligible
- Injured
- Redshirt
