= 1973 Nicholls State Colonels football team =

American college football season

1973 Nicholls State Colonels football
- Conference: Gulf South Conference
- Record: 2–9 (2–7 GSC)
- Head coach: Gary Kinchen (2nd season)
- Home stadium: John L. Guidry Stadium

1973 Gulf South Conference football standings
	Conf.					Overall
Team	W		L		T	W		L		T
No. T–17 Troy State $	6	–	1	–	0	7	–	2	–	1
No. 4 Jacksonville State	5	–	2	–	0	7	–	2	–	0
Delta State	6	–	3	–	0	8	–	3	–	0
Livingston	4	–	3	–	1	6	–	3	–	1
Northwestern State	3	–	4	–	0	5	–	6	–	0
Mississippi College	3	–	4	–	0	4	–	6	–	0
Southeastern Louisiana	3	–	4	–	0	4	–	6	–	0
Florence State	3	–	6	–	0	4	–	6	–	0
Nicholls State	2	–	7	–	0	2	–	9	–	0
Tennessee–Martin	1	–	5	–	1	2	–	8	–	1
$ – Conference champion; Rankings from NAIA Division I poll

The 1973 Nicholls State Colonels football team represented Nicholls State University as a member of the Gulf South Conference (GSC) during the 1973 NCAA Division II football season. Led by Gary Kinchen in his second and final seasons as head coach, the Colonels compiled an overall record of 2–9 with a mark of 2–7 in conference play, placing ninth in the GSC. Nicholls State played home games at John L. Guidry Stadium in Thibodaux, Louisiana.

== Schedule ==
Date	Time	Opponent	Site	Result	Attendance	Source
September 8		Tennessee–Martin	John L. Guidry Stadium; Thibodaux, LA	W 7–0	6,800	
September 15		Jacksonville State	John L. Guidry Stadium; Thibodaux, LA	L 10–28	8,300	
September 22		at Troy State	Rip Hewes Stadium; Dothan, AL	L 7–42	6,500	
September 29		at Southeastern Louisiana	Strawberry Stadium; Hammond LA (rivalry)	L 0–10	8,500	
October 6		Northwestern State	John L. Guidry Stadium; Thibodaux, LA (rivalry)	W 3–0	9,000	
October 13		at Mississippi College	Robinson Hale Stadium; Clinton, MS	L 7–21	3,800	
October 20		at McNeese State*	Cowboy Stadium; Lake Charles, LA	L 7–28	10,000	
October 27	7:30 p.m.	Florence State	John L. Guidry Stadium; Thibodaux, LA	L 11–27	6,500	
November 3		at Livingston	Tiger Stadium; Livingston, AL	L 16–29	4,500	
November 10		at Northeast Louisiana*	Brown Stadium; Monroe, LA	L 0–37	7,800	
November 17		Delta State	John L. Guidry Stadium; Thibodaux, LA	L 22–27	4,000	
*Non-conference game; All times are in Central time; Source:
