= 1976 Nicholls State Colonels football team =

American college football season

1976 Nicholls State Colonels football
- Conference: Gulf South Conference
- Record: 4–6–1 (2–5–1 GSC)
- Head coach: Bill Clements (3rd season)
- Home stadium: John L. Guidry Stadium

1976 Gulf South Conference football standings
	Conf.					Overall
Team	W		L		T	W		L		T
No. 6 Troy State $	7	–	1	–	0	8	–	1	–	1
Southeastern Louisiana	6	–	1	–	1	9	–	1	–	1
Jacksonville State	6	–	2	–	0	6	–	4	–	0
Tennessee–Martin	5	–	3	–	0	8	–	3	–	0
Livingston	5	–	3	–	0	5	–	5	–	0
North Alabama	3	–	4	–	1	4	–	5	–	1
Delta State	2	–	5	–	1	4	–	6	–	1
Nicholls State	2	–	5	–	1	4	–	6	–	1
Mississippi College	0	–	8	–	0	2	–	8	–	0
$ – Conference champion; Troy State's and Livingston's games against Alabama State, Jacksonville State's game against Alabama A&M, Tennessee–Martin's games against Austin Peay and Murray State, and Mississippi College's game against Ouachita Baptist were designated as conference games and counted in the Gulf South standings.; Rankings from AP Poll

The 1976 Nicholls State Colonels football team represented Nicholls State University as a member of the Gulf South Conference (GSC) during the 1976 NCAA Division II football season. Led by third-year head coach Bill Clements, the Colonels compiled an overall record of 4–6–1 with a mark of 2–5–1 in conference play, tying for seventh place in the GSC. Nicholls State played home games at John L. Guidry Stadium in Thibodaux, Louisiana.

== Schedule ==
Date	Opponent	Site	Result	Attendance	Source
September 11	Mississippi College	John L. Guidry Stadium; Thibodaux, LA	W 17–7	12,500	
September 18	at Jacksonville State	Paul Snow Stadium; Jacksonville, AL	L 7–34	8,000	
September 25	Troy State	John L. Guidry Stadium; Thibodaux, LA	L 9–14	11,500	
October 2	Cameron*	John L. Guidry Stadium; Thibodaux, LA	W 14–0	7,000	
October 9	at Northwestern State*	Harry Turpin Stadium; Natchitoches, LA (rivalry)	L 8–20	9,000	
October 16	at Tennessee–Martin	Pacer Stadium; Martin, TN	W 3–0	7,000	
October 23	Austin Peay*	John L. Guidry Stadium; Thibodaux, LA	W 7–0	10,500	
October 30	Livingston	John L. Guidry Stadium; Thibodaux, LA	L 14–20	8,000	
November 6	at North Alabama	Braly Municipal Stadium; Florence, AL	L 7–37	6,800	
November 13	vs. Southeastern Louisiana	Louisiana Superdome; New Orleans, LA (rivalry)	L 7–17	15,000	
November 20	at Delta State	McCool Stadium; Cleveland, MS	T 7–7	1,000	
*Non-conference game; Source:
