= Eugene Lamone =

Former american football player and coach (born 1933)

No. 72
- Positions: Guard, Defensive tackle

Personal information
- Born: April 24, 1933 (age 93); Wellsburg, West Virginia
- Listed height: 6 ft 2 in (1.88 m)
- Listed weight: 215 lb (98 kg)

Career information
- High school: Wellsburg
- College: West Virginia
- NFL draft: 1955: 5th round, 57th overall pick

Career history
- Philadelphia Eagles (1955–1957); Cleveland Browns (1957)

Awards and highlights
- Second-team AP All-American (1953); Third-team AP All-American (1954); All-Southern Conference selection (1954); Jacobs Blocking Trophy winner (1954)

Gene "Beef" Lamone (born April 24, 1933) is a former American football player and coach. One of the most celebrated offensive linemen in West Virginia University history, Lamone was a two-time All-American, a 60-minute player during the golden era of Mountaineer football, and later a successful coach and corporate executive.

== Early life and education ==
Lamone was born on April 24, 1933, in Wellsburg, West Virginia, and attended Wellsburg High School, where he was an all-star in football, baseball, and track. Known for his tenacity and physical style of play, he emerged as a standout football lineman and became the first member of his family to attend college.

Lamone graduated from WVU in 1955 with a degree in marketing and business.

== Career ==
=== College ===
Lamone enrolled at West Virginia University in 1951 and became a four-year letterwinner under head coach Art Lewis. Nicknamed “Beef” for his stocky, powerful build, he quickly established himself as a dominant force on both sides of the line.

Lamone was a 60-minute player during his final two seasons and helped lead WVU to a 28–7 record over four years, including victories over Penn State, a 1954 Sugar Bowl appearance, and a final #12 AP national ranking in 1954. He played alongside Mountaineer legends like Bruce Bosley, Sam Huff, Fred Wyant, and Joe Marconi. During his sophomore season, WVU’s 24–0 win over George Washington University launched a school-record streak of 30 consecutive Southern Conference victories.

=== Professional ===
Lamone was selected in the fifth round of the 1955 NFL draft (57th overall pick). He went on to play two seasons with the Philadelphia Eagles and one season with the Cleveland Browns, but a knee injury cut his professional football career short.

=== Coaching ===
Following his playing career, Lamone moved to Wheeling, West Virginia, where he became head football coach at Linsly School, serving in that role for eight years.
