= John Levra =

American football player and coach (1937–2026)

Biographical details
- Born: October 2, 1937; Arma, Kansas, U.S.
- Died: January 7, 2026 (aged 88); Leawood, Kansas, U.S.

Playing career
- 1956–1958: Pittsburg State
- Positions: Guard, linebacker

Coaching career (HC unless noted)
- 1966: New Mexico Highlands (assistant)
- 1967–1970: New Mexico Highlands
- 1971–1974: Stephen F. Austin
- 1975–1978: Kansas (OC/OL)
- 1979: North Texas (OC/OL)
- 1980: BC Lions (DL)
- 1981–1985: New Orleans Saints (OB)
- 1986–1992: Chicago Bears (DL)
- 1993–1994: Denver Broncos (OL)
- 1995–1997: Minnesota Vikings (DL)
- 1998–2002: Buffalo Bills (DL)

Administrative career (AD unless noted)
- 1971–1974: Stephen F. Austin

Head coaching record
- Overall: 57–24–1
- Bowls: 1–0
- Tournaments: 0–3 (NAIA / NAIA D-I playoffs)

John Louis Levra (October 2, 1937 – January 7, 2026) was an American football player and coach. He served as the head football coach at New Mexico Highlands University from 1967 to 1970, and Stephen F. Austin University from 1971 until 1974, compiling a career college football record of 57–24–1. Levra died on January 7, 2026, at the age of 88.

== Head coaching record ==
Year	Team	Overall	Conference	Standing	Bowl/playoffs
New Mexico Highlands Cowboys (NAIA / NAIA Division I independent) (1967–1970)
1967	New Mexico Highlands	9–1			L NAIA Division I Semifinal
1968	New Mexico Highlands	9–0			
1969	New Mexico Highlands	8–1–1			L NAIA Division I Semifinal
1970	New Mexico Highlands	9–2			L NAIA Division I Semifinal
New Mexico Highlands:		35–4–1			
Stephen F. Austin Lumberjacks (Lone Star Conference) (1971–1974)
1971	Stephen F. Austin	2–8	2–7	T–8th	
1972	Stephen F. Austin	2–7	2–6	8th	
1973	Stephen F. Austin	9–3	6–3	T–3rd	W Poultry
1974	Stephen F. Austin	9–2	7–2	2nd	
Stephen F. Austin:		22–20	17–18		
Total:		57–24–1			
