= 1953 All-Southern Conference football team =

The 1953 All-Southern Conference football team consists of American football players chosen by the Associated Press (AP) for the All-Southern Conference football team for the 1953 college football season.

== All-Southern Conference selections ==
=== Backs ===
- Fred Wyant, West Virginia (AP-1)
- Tommy Allman, West Virginia (AP-1)
- Johnny Mapp, VMI (AP-1)
- Bill Bowman, William & Mary (AP-1)

=== Ends ===
- Bill Marker, West Virginia (AP-1)
- Richie Gaskell, George Washington (AP-1)

=== Tackles ===
- Bruce Bosley, West Virginia (AP-1)
- George Preas, Virginia Tech (AP-1)

=== Guards ===
- Gene Lamone, West Virginia (AP-1)
- Harold Grizzard, Virginia Tech (AP-1)

=== Centers ===
- Steve Korcheck, George Washington (AP-1)

== Key ==
AP = Associated Press

== See also ==
- 1953 College Football All-America Team
