= Southeastern Louisiana Lions football, 1970–1979 =

American college football seasons

The Southeastern Louisiana Lions football program, 1970–1979 represented Southeastern Louisiana University during the decade of the 1970s. The Lions competed as a member of the Gulf States Conference in 1970, the Gulf South Conference from 1971 to 1978, and as an NCAA Division II independent in 1979. During the decade, the Lions were led by three different head coaches and had an overall record for the decade of 49–55–2. During this decade, the Lions played their home games on campus at Strawberry Stadium in Hammond, Louisiana.

Pat Kenelly lead Southeastern for their final season in the Gulf States Conference in 1970 and their first season as a member of the Gulf South Conference in 1971. After finishing winless in 1971, Kenelly resigned as head coach and became athletic director. Kenelly complied an overall record of 4–17 during these two seasons. Roland Dale next led the Lions for their 1972 and 1973 seasons to an overall record of 7–14. After Dale resiged as head coach, his assistant Billy Brewer was promoted to head coach and finished the decade with an overall record of 38–24–2.

== 1970 ==
1970 Southeastern Louisiana Lions football
- Conference: Gulf States Conference
- Record: 4–6 (2–3 GSC)
- Head coach: Pat Kenelly (6th season)
- Home stadium: Strawberry Stadium

1970 Gulf States Conference football standings
	Conf.					Overall
Team	W		L		T	W		L		T
Southwestern Louisiana $	5	–	0	–	0	9	–	2	–	0
Northwestern State	3	–	2	–	0	7	–	3	–	0
Northeast Louisiana	3	–	2	–	0	5	–	4	–	0
McNeese State	2	–	3	–	0	5	–	6	–	0
Southeastern Louisiana	2	–	3	–	0	4	–	6	–	0
Louisiana Tech	0	–	5	–	0	2	–	8	–	0
$ – Conference champion

The 1970 Southeastern Louisiana Lions football team was an American football team that represented Southeastern Louisiana University as a member of the Gulf States Conference (GSC) during the 1970 NCAA College Division football season. In their sixth year under head coach Pat Kenelly, the team compiled an overall record of 4–6 with a mark of 2–3 in conference play, and finished tied for fourth in the GSC. Southeastern Louisiana played their home games on campus at Strawberry Stadium in Hammond, Louisiana.

This was the final season Southeastern Louisiana competed as a member of the Gulf States Conference as it was officially dissolved in May 1971.

Schedule

Date	Opponent	Site	Result	Attendance	Source
September 19	at Southwestern Louisiana	McNaspy Stadium; Lafayette, LA (Cypress Mug)	L 6–17	12,000	
September 26	No. 1 Arkansas State*	Strawberry Stadium; Hammond, LA	L 3–12	6,500	
October 3	Troy State*	Strawberry Stadium; Hammond, LA	L 12–21	6,000	
October 10	Pensacola Navy*	Strawberry Stadium; Hammond, LA	W 16–3	5,500	
October 17	at Trinity (TX)*	Alamo Stadium; San Antonio, TX	L 9–17	2,800	
October 24	Northeast Louisiana	Strawberry Stadium; Hammond, LA	L 17–20	7,300	
October 31	Youngstown State*	Strawberry Stadium; Hammond, LA	W 50–27	5,000	
November 7	at Louisiana Tech	Louisiana Tech Stadium; Ruston, LA	W 24–21	10,000	
November 14	McNeese State	Strawberry Stadium; Hammond, LA	W 15–7	5,500	
November 21	at Northwestern State	Demon Stadium; Natchitoches, LA	L 14–22	5,500	
*Non-conference game; Rankings from UPI Poll released prior to the game; Source:

== 1971 ==
1971 Southeastern Louisiana Lions football
- Conference: Gulf South Conference
- Record: 0–11 (0–6 GSC)
- Head coach: Pat Kenelly (7th season)
- Home stadium: Strawberry Stadium

1971 Gulf South Conference football standings
	Conf.					Overall
Team	W		L		T	W		L		T
No. 1 Livingston +^	5	–	1	–	0	11	–	1	–	0
Troy State +	5	–	1	–	0	6	–	3	–	0
Jacksonville State	3	–	2	–	0	6	–	3	–	0
Tennessee–Martin	3	–	3	–	0	5	–	5	–	0
Delta State	2	–	4	–	0	3	–	5	–	1
Florence State	0	–	6	–	0	1	–	10	–	0
Southeastern Louisiana	0	–	6	–	0	0	–	11	–	0
+ – Conference co-champions; ^ – NAIA Division I playoff participant; Rankings from NAIA Division I poll

The 1971 Southeastern Louisiana Lions football team was an American football team that represented Southeastern Louisiana University as a member of the Gulf South Conference (GSC) during the 1971 NCAA College Division football season. In their seventh year under head coach Pat Kenelly, the team compiled an overall record of 0–11 with a mark of 0–6 in conference play, and finished tied for sixth in the GSC. Southeastern Louisiana played their home games on campus at Strawberry Stadium in Hammond, Louisiana. This was the first season Southeastern Louisiana competed as a member of the Gulf South Conference.

Southeastern Louisiana's games against Trinity (TX), Northeast Louisiana, Louisiana Tech, and Abilene Christian were all designated as conference games and counted in the Gulf South standings.

In November, Kenelly resigned as head coach to accept an appointment as the full-time athletic director at Southeastern Louisiana.

Schedule

Date	Opponent	Site	Result	Attendance	Source
September 11	at Eastern Kentucky*	Hanger Field; Richmond, KY	L 12–20	16,000	
September 18	Southwestern Louisiana*	Strawberry Stadium; Hammond, LA (Cypress Mug)	L 6–7	8,900	
September 25	at Quantico Marines*	Butler Stadium; Quantico, VA	L 0–13	9,000	
October 2	at Troy State	Veterans Memorial Stadium; Troy, AL	L 6–31	5,500	
October 9	Jacksonville State	Strawberry Stadium; Hammond, LA	L 14–20	7,200	
October 16	Trinity (TX)	Strawberry Stadium; Hammond, LA	L 17–24	3,500–4,000	
October 23	at Northeast Louisiana	Brown Stadium; Monroe, LA	L 0–3	8,300	
October 30	No. 8 Louisiana Tech	Strawberry Stadium; Hammond, LA	L 9–24	7,000–7,200	
November 6	Abilene Christian	Strawberry Stadium; Hammond, LA	L 7–28	3,000–3,500	
November 13	at No. 2 McNeese State*	Cowboy Stadium; Lake Charles, LA	L 0–31	13,000	
November 20	Northwestern State*	Strawberry Field; Hammond, LA	L 6–14	2,500–5,000	
*Non-conference game; Rankings from AP Poll released prior to the game; Source:

== 1972 ==
1972 Southeastern Louisiana Lions football
- Conference: Gulf South Conference
- Record: 3–8 (2–4 GSC)
- Head coach: Roland Dale (1st season)
- Home stadium: Strawberry Stadium

1972 Gulf South Conference football standings
	Conf.					Overall
Team	W		L		T	W		L		T
No. 5 Northwestern State $	6	–	0	–	0	8	–	2	–	0
No. 3 Livingston ^	5	–	1	–	0	8	–	1	–	2
No. 19 Jacksonville State	4	–	1	–	1	7	–	2	–	1
Delta State	5	–	2	–	0	7	–	3	–	1
Troy State	2	–	3	–	1	4	–	5	–	1
Southeastern Louisiana	2	–	4	–	0	4	–	7	–	0
Nicholls State	1	–	5	–	0	3	–	8	–	0
Florence State	1	–	5	–	0	2	–	9	–	0
Tennessee–Martin	1	–	5	–	0	1	–	9	–	0
Mississippi College *	0	–	0	–	0	4	–	5	–	1
$ – Conference champion; ^ – NAIA Division I playoff participant * – Did not compete for conference title; Rankings from NAIA Division I poll

The 1972 Southeastern Louisiana Lions football team was an American football team that represented Southeastern Louisiana University as a member of the Gulf South Conference (GSC) during the 1972 NCAA College Division football season. In their first year under head coach Roland Dale, the team compiled an overall record of 3–8 with a mark of 2–4 in conference play, and finished sixth in the GSC. Southeastern Louisiana played their home games on campus at Strawberry Stadium in Hammond, Louisiana.

In November 1971, Dale was hired as head coach of the Lions. Prior to his arrival at Southeastern Louisiana he served as an assistant coach at Ole Miss.

Southeastern Louisiana's game against Northeast Louisiana was a designated conference game and counted in the Gulf South standings.

Schedule

Date	Opponent	Site	Result	Attendance	Source
September 9	Eastern Kentucky*	Strawberry Stadium; Hammond, LA	L 0–10	7,500	
September 16	at Southwestern Louisiana*	Cajun Field; Lafayette, LA (Cypress Mug)	L 7–30	14,623	
September 23	at Abilene Christian*	Shotwell Stadium; Abilene, TX	W 14–10	7,012	
September 30	Nicholls State	Strawberry Stadium; Hammond, LA (rivalry)	W 31–9	8,000–8,500	
October 7	Troy State	Strawberry Stadium; Hammond, LA	W 20–19	8,300	
October 14	at Jacksonville State	Paul Snow Stadium; Jacksonville, AL	L 7–10	3,000	
October 21	Northeast Louisiana	Strawberry Stadium; Hammond, LA	L 9–34	6,000	
October 28	at No. 2 Louisiana Tech*	Louisiana Tech Stadium; Ruston, LA	L 0–21	11,000	
November 4	Delta State^{†}	Strawberry Stadium; Hammond, LA	L 7–24	7,200	
November 11	No. 10 McNeese State*	Strawberry Stadium; Hammond, LA	L 13–31	4,500	
November 18	at Northwestern State	Demon Stadium; Natchitoches, LA	L 3–6	900–1,000	
*Non-conference game; ^{†}Homecoming; Rankings from AP Poll released prior to the game; Source:

== 1973 ==
1973 Southeastern Louisiana Lions football
- Conference: Gulf South Conference
- Record: 4–6 (3–4 GSC)
- Head coach: Roland Dale (2nd season)
- Home stadium: Strawberry Stadium

1973 Gulf South Conference football standings
	Conf.					Overall
Team	W		L		T	W		L		T
No. T–17 Troy State $	6	–	1	–	0	7	–	2	–	1
No. 4 Jacksonville State	5	–	2	–	0	7	–	2	–	0
Delta State	6	–	3	–	0	8	–	3	–	0
Livingston	4	–	3	–	1	6	–	3	–	1
Northwestern State	3	–	4	–	0	5	–	6	–	0
Mississippi College	3	–	4	–	0	4	–	6	–	0
Southeastern Louisiana	3	–	4	–	0	4	–	6	–	0
Florence State	3	–	6	–	0	4	–	6	–	0
Nicholls State	2	–	7	–	0	2	–	9	–	0
Tennessee–Martin	1	–	5	–	1	2	–	8	–	1
$ – Conference champion; Rankings from NAIA Division I poll

The 1973 Southeastern Louisiana Lions football team was an American football team that represented Southeastern Louisiana University as a member of the Gulf South Conference (GSC) during the 1973 NCAA Division II football season. In their second year under head coach Roland Dale, the team compiled an overall record of 4–6 with a mark of 3–4 in conference play, and finished tied for fifth in the GSC. Southeastern Louisiana played their home games on campus at Strawberry Stadium in Hammond, Louisiana.

In late December, Dale resigned as head coach to become the athletic director at Southern Miss.

Schedule

Date	Opponent	Site	Result	Attendance	Source
September 8	Florence State	Strawberry Stadium; Hammond, LA	W 26–0	7,000	
September 15	at McNeese State*	Cowboy Stadium; Lake Charles, LA	L 10–40	12,000–12,700	
September 22	at Livingston	Tiger Stadium; Livingston, AL	L 0–11	3,500	
September 29	Nicholls State	Strawberry Stadium; Hammond LA (rivalry)	W 10–0	8,500	
October 6	at Troy State	Veterans Memorial Stadium; Troy, AL	L 0–24	6,000–7,000	
October 13	Jacksonville State	Strawberry Stadium; Hammond, LA	W 11–10	6,000	
October 20	at Northeast Louisiana*	Brown Stadium; Monroe, LA	W 17–0	8,200–8,500	
October 27	No. 8 Louisiana Tech*	Strawberry Stadium; Hammond, LA	L 7–26	8,500	
November 3	at Delta State	McCool Stadium; Cleveland, MS	L 10–14	2,500	
November 17	Northwestern State	Strawberry Field; Hammond, LA	L 14–21	5,000	
*Non-conference game; Rankings from AP Poll released prior to the game; Source:

== 1974 ==
1974 Southeastern Louisiana Lions football
- Conference: Gulf South Conference
- Record: 6–4 (5–3 GSC)
- Head coach: Billy Brewer (1st season)
- Home stadium: Strawberry Stadium

1974 Gulf South Conference football standings
	Conf.					Overall
Team	W		L		T	W		L		T
No. 7 Jacksonville State $	7	–	1	–	0	7	–	4	–	0
Delta State	7	–	2	–	0	8	–	3	–	0
No. 8 Livingston	5	–	3	–	0	8	–	3	–	0
Southeastern Louisiana	5	–	3	–	0	6	–	4	–	0
Troy State	4	–	4	–	0	6	–	4	–	0
North Alabama	4	–	4	–	0	4	–	6	–	0
Nicholls State	4	–	5	–	0	5	–	6	–	0
Northwestern State	1	–	6	–	0	1	–	10	–	0
Tennessee–Martin	1	–	7	–	0	2	–	9	–	0
Mississippi College	0	–	7	–	0	2	–	9	–	0
$ – Conference champion; Rankings from NAIA Division I poll

The 1974 Southeastern Louisiana Lions football team was an American football team that represented Southeastern Louisiana University as a member of the Gulf South Conference (GSC) during the 1974 NCAA Division II football season. In their first year under head coach Billy Brewer, the team compiled an overall record of 6–4 with a mark of 5–3 in conference play, and finished tied for third in the GSC. Southeastern Louisiana played their home games on campus at Strawberry Stadium in Hammond, Louisiana.

In December 1973, Brewer was promoted to head coach after Roland Dale resigned the post.

Schedule

Date	Opponent	Site	Result	Attendance	Source
September 14	at North Alabama	Braly Municipal Stadium; Florence, AL	W 21–17	8,300	
September 21	Tennessee–Martin	Strawberry Stadium; Hammond, LA	W 44–13	7,000	
September 28	Livingston	Strawberry Stadium; Hammond, LA	W 27–21	7,500	
October 5	at Jacksonville State	Paul Snow Stadium; Jacksonville, AL	L 10–22	8,800	
October 12	No. 13 Troy State	Strawberry Stadium; Hammond, LA	W 35–25	9,000–9,100	
October 26	Northeast Louisiana*	Strawberry Stadium; Hammond, LA	W 23–8	9,000	
November 2	at No. 1 Louisiana Tech*	Joe Aillet Stadium; Ruston, LA	L 13–34	16,700	
November 9	Delta State	Strawberry Stadium; Hammond, LA	W 41–7	7,800	
November 16	at Nicholls State	John L. Guidry Stadium; Thibodaux, LA (rivalry)	L 0–10	9,000	
November 23	at Northwestern State	Demon Stadium; Natchitoches, LA	L 3–40	2,000	
*Non-conference game; Rankings from AP Poll released prior to the game; Source:

== 1975 ==
1975 Southeastern Louisiana Lions football
- Conference: Gulf South Conference
- Record: 4–7 (2–6 GSC)
- Head coach: Billy Brewer (2nd season)
- Home stadium: Strawberry Stadium

1975 Gulf South Conference football standings
	Conf.					Overall
Team	W		L		T	W		L		T
Nicholls State $	7	–	2	–	0	8	–	2	–	0
No. 6 Livingston ^	6	–	2	–	0	10	–	3	–	0
No. 11 Jacksonville State	5	–	3	–	0	7	–	3	–	0
Troy State	5	–	3	–	0	6	–	4	–	0
Delta State	5	–	4	–	0	6	–	4	–	0
North Alabama	4	–	4	–	0	6	–	4	–	0
Mississippi College	2	–	5	–	0	6	–	5	–	0
Southeastern Louisiana	2	–	6	–	0	4	–	7	–	0
Tennessee–Martin	1	–	7	–	0	2	–	8	–	0
$ – Conference champion; ^ – NCAA Division II playoff participant; Rankings from NCAA Division II AP poll for Livingston and NAIA Division I poll for Jacksonville State

The 1975 Southeastern Louisiana Lions football team was an American football team that represented Southeastern Louisiana University as a member of the Gulf South Conference (GSC) during the 1975 NCAA Division II football season. In their second year under head coach Billy Brewer, the team compiled an overall record of 4–7 with a mark of 2–6 in conference play, and finished eighth in the GSC. Southeastern Louisiana played their home games on campus at Strawberry Stadium in Hammond, Louisiana.

Southeastern Louisiana's game against Northwestern State was a designated conference game and counted in the Gulf South standings.

Schedule

Date	Opponent	Site	Result	Attendance	Source
September 13	North Alabama	Strawberry Stadium; Hammond, LA	W 28–15	8,300	
September 20	at Tennessee–Martin	Pacer Stadium; Martin, TN	L 7–23	6,200	
September 27	Cameron*	Strawberry Stadium; Hammond, LA	W 31–10	8,600	
October 4	Jacksonville State	Strawberry Stadium; Hammond, LA	L 7–38	8,100	
October 11	at Troy State	Veterans Memorial Stadium; Troy, AL	L 7–26	3,000–4,000	
October 18	at Livingston	Tiger Stadium; Livingston, AL	L 13–43	2,000	
October 25	at Northeast Louisiana*	Brown Stadium; Monroe, LA	W 49–19	4,500	
November 1	Louisiana Tech*	Strawberry Stadium; Hammond, LA	L 28–33	7,300	
November 8	at Delta State	McCool Stadium; Cleveland, MS	L 10–19	7,300	
November 15	vs. Nicholls State	Louisiana Superdome; New Orleans, LA (rivalry)	L 6–14	20,000	
November 22	Northwestern State	Strawberry Field; Hammond, LA	W 31–6	2,500	
*Non-conference game; Source:

== 1976 ==
1976 Southeastern Louisiana Lions football
- Conference: Gulf South Conference
- Record: 9–1–1 (6–1–1 GSC)
- Head coach: Billy Brewer (3rd season)
- Home stadium: Strawberry Stadium

1976 Gulf South Conference football standings
	Conf.					Overall
Team	W		L		T	W		L		T
No. 6 Troy State $	7	–	1	–	0	8	–	1	–	1
Southeastern Louisiana	6	–	1	–	1	9	–	1	–	1
Jacksonville State	6	–	2	–	0	6	–	4	–	0
Tennessee–Martin	5	–	3	–	0	8	–	3	–	0
Livingston	5	–	3	–	0	5	–	5	–	0
North Alabama	3	–	4	–	1	4	–	5	–	1
Delta State	2	–	5	–	1	4	–	6	–	1
Nicholls State	2	–	5	–	1	4	–	6	–	1
Mississippi College	0	–	8	–	0	2	–	8	–	0
$ – Conference champion; Troy State's and Livingston's games against Alabama State, Jacksonville State's game against Alabama A&M, Tennessee–Martin's games against Austin Peay and Murray State, and Mississippi College's game against Ouachita Baptist were designated as conference games and counted in the Gulf South standings.; Rankings from AP Poll

The 1976 Southeastern Louisiana Lions football team was an American football team that represented Southeastern Louisiana University as a member of the Gulf South Conference (GSC) during the 1976 NCAA Division II football season. In their third year under head coach Billy Brewer, the team compiled an overall record of 9–1–1 with a mark of 6–1–1 in conference play, and finished second in the GSC. Southeastern Louisiana played their home games on campus at Strawberry Stadium in Hammond, Louisiana.

Schedule

Date	Opponent	Site	Result	Attendance	Source
September 4	Tennessee–Martin	Strawberry Stadium; Hammond, LA	W 28–12	7,000	
September 11	at North Alabama	Braly Municipal Stadium; Florence, AL	T 28–28	7,500	
September 25	at Cameron*	Cameron Stadium; Lawton, OK	W 35–14	3,000	
October 2	at Jacksonville State	Paul Snow Stadium; Jacksonville, AL	W 13–3	8,000–8,100	
October 9	No. 4 Troy State	Strawberry Stadium; Hammond, LA	W 21–7	8,300–8,500	
October 16	at Livingston	Tiger Stadium; Livingston, AL	L 10–20	7,000	
October 23	Northeast Louisiana*	Strawberry Stadium; Hammond, LA	W 14–10	8,500	
October 30	Mississippi College	Strawberry Stadium; Hammond, LA	W 34–20	7,800	
November 6	Delta State	Strawberry Stadium; Hammond, LA	W 3–0	5,000	
November 13	vs. Nicholls State	Louisiana Superdome; New Orleans, LA (rivalry)	W 17–7	15,000	
November 20	at Northwestern State*	Harry Turpin Stadium; Natchitoches, LA (rivalry)	W 34–27	4,000	
*Non-conference game; Rankings from AP Poll released prior to the game; Source:

== 1977 ==
1977 Southeastern Louisiana Lions football
- Conference: Gulf South Conference
- Record: 6–4 (5–3 GSC)
- Head coach: Billy Brewer (4th season)
- Home stadium: Strawberry Stadium

1977 Gulf South Conference football standings
	Conf.					Overall
Team	W		L		T	W		L		T
No. 9 Jacksonville State $^	7	–	1	–	0	11	–	3	–	0
Tennessee–Martin	6	–	2	–	0	8	–	3	–	0
Troy State	6	–	2	–	0	6	–	4	–	0
Southeastern Louisiana	5	–	3	–	0	6	–	4	–	0
Mississippi College	4	–	4	–	0	6	–	4	–	0
North Alabama	3	–	5	–	0	5	–	5	–	0
Delta State	3	–	5	–	0	4	–	6	–	0
Nicholls State	2	–	6	–	0	4	–	7	–	0
Livingston	1	–	7	–	0	2	–	8	–	0
$ – Conference champion; ^ – NCAA Division II playoff participant; Jacksonville State's game against Tennessee Tech, Tennessee–Martin's games against Austin Peay and Murray State, Troy State's game against Northern Michigan, Southeastern Louisiana's game against Sam Houston State, Mississippi College's game against Ouachita Baptist, North Alabama's game against Austin Peay, Nicholls State's games against Cameron and Austin Peay, and Livingston's game against Alabama State were designated as conference games and counted in the Gulf South standings.; Rankings from AP Poll

The 1977 Southeastern Louisiana Lions football team was an American football team that represented Southeastern Louisiana University as a member of the Gulf South Conference (GSC) during the 1977 NCAA Division II football season. In their fourth year under head coach Billy Brewer, the team compiled an overall record of 6–4 with a mark of 5–3 in conference play, and finished fourth in the GSC. Southeastern Louisiana played their home games on campus at Strawberry Stadium in Hammond, Louisiana.

Schedule

Date	Opponent	Site	Result	Attendance	Source
September 17	at Sam Houston State (Note: Southeastern Louisiana's game against Sam Houston State was a designated conference game and counted in the GSC standings.)	Pritchett Field; Huntsville, TX	W 20–0	3,000	
September 24	North Alabama	Strawberry Stadium; Hammond, LA	L 7–29	8,000	
October 1	No. 4 Jacksonville State	Strawberry Stadium; Hammond, LA	L 10–14	7,000–7,500	
October 8	at Troy State	Veterans Memorial Stadium; Troy, AL	L 15–17	7,000	
October 15	Livingston	Strawberry Stadium; Hammond, LA	W 30–3	5,000	
October 22	at Northeast Louisiana*	Brown Stadium; Monroe, LA	L 19–24	8,000	
October 29	Mississippi College^{†}	Strawberry Stadium; Hammond, LA	W 23–6	7,000	
November 5	at Delta State	McCool Stadium; Cleveland, MS	W 10–7	2,000	
November 12	at Nicholls State	John L. Guidry Stadium; Thibodaux, LA (rivalry)	W 17–14	4,124	
November 19	Northwestern State*	Strawberry Stadium; Hammond, LA (rivalry)	W 38–21	2,000	
*Non-conference game; ^{†}Homecoming; Rankings from AP Poll released prior to the game; Source:

== 1978 ==
1978 Southeastern Louisiana Lions football
- Conference: Gulf South Conference
- Record: 7–3–1 (5–1–1 GSC)
- Head coach: Billy Brewer (5th season)
- Home stadium: Strawberry Stadium

1978 Gulf South Conference football standings
	Conf.					Overall
Team	W		L		T	W		L		T
No. 7 Jacksonville State $	6	–	1	–	0	7	–	3	–	0
Southeastern Louisiana	5	–	1	–	1	7	–	3	–	1
Troy State	5	–	2	–	0	8	–	2	–	0
Nicholls State	5	–	2	–	0	5	–	6	–	0
North Alabama	4	–	2	–	1	7	–	2	–	1
Mississippi College	3	–	4	–	0	5	–	5	–	0
Delta State	2	–	6	–	0	3	–	7	–	0
Livingston	1	–	6	–	0	3	–	7	–	0
Tennessee–Martin	0	–	7	–	0	2	–	8	–	0
$ – Conference champion; Rankings from AP Poll

The 1978 Southeastern Louisiana Lions football team was an American football team that represented Southeastern Louisiana University as a member of the Gulf South Conference (GSC) during the 1978 NCAA Division II football season. In their fifth year under head coach Billy Brewer, the team compiled an overall record of 7–3–1 with a mark of 5–1–1 in conference play, and finished second in the GSC. Southeastern Louisiana played their home games on campus at Strawberry Stadium in Hammond, Louisiana.

This was the final season Southeastern Louisiana competed as a member of the GSC. They competed as an NCAA Division II independent in 1979 prior to moving up to Division I-AA.

Schedule

Date	Opponent	Site	Result	Attendance	Source
September 2	Southwest Texas State*	Strawberry Stadium; Hammond, LA	L 0–7	6,500	
September 16	Sam Houston State*	Strawberry Stadium; Hammond, LA	W 12–0	6,500	
September 23	at North Alabama	Braly Municipal Stadium; Florence, AL	T 7–7	7,000	
September 30	at No. 10 Jacksonville State	Paul Snow Stadium; Jacksonville, AL	L 7–10	8,000–10,000	
October 7	No. 7 Troy State	Strawberry Stadium; Hammond, LA	W 45–7	7,200–7,500	
October 14	Livingston	Strawberry Stadium; Hammond, LA	W 33–0	7,500	
October 21	at Northeast Louisiana*	Malone Stadium; Monroe, LA	W 25–21	9,000	
October 28	at Mississippi College	Robinson Stadium; Clinton, MS	W 13–10	6,200	
November 4	Delta State	Strawberry Stadium; Hammond, LA	W 34–3	6,000	
November 11	vs. Nicholls State	Louisiana Superdome; New Orleans, LA (rivalry)	W 10–0	10,000	
November 18	at Northwestern State*	Harry Turpin Stadium; Natchitoches, LA (rivalry)	L 12–13	5,000	
*Non-conference game; Rankings from AP Poll released prior to the game; Source:

== 1979 ==
1979 Southeastern Louisiana Lions football
- Conference: Independent
- Record: 6–5
- Head coach: Billy Brewer (6th season)
- Home stadium: Strawberry Stadium

1979 NCAA Division II independents football records
	Conf.			Overall
Team	W	L	T	W		L		T
No. 1 Delaware ^		–		13	–	1	–	0
Towson State		–		9	–	1	–	0
No. 4 Morgan State ^		–		9	–	2	–	0
Springfield		–		8	–	2	–	0
Eastern Washington		–		7	–	2	–	0
Nicholls State		–		8	–	3	–	0
United States International		–		8	–	3	–	0
American International		–		6	–	3	–	0
No. 10 Santa Clara		–		6	–	3	–	0
Kentucky State		–		6	–	5	–	0
Alabama State		–		6	–	5	–	0
Southeastern Louisiana		–		6	–	5	–	0
Central State (OH)		–		5	–	5	–	0
C.W. Post		–		5	–	4	–	0
Central Connecticut		–		4	–	5	–	0
James Madison		–		4	–	5	–	0
West Chester		–		4	–	7	–	0
Southern Connecticut State		–		3	–	7	–	0
Arkansas–Pine Bluff		–		2	–	8	–	0
Northern Colorado		–		2	–	8	–	0
^ – NCAA Division II playoff participant; Rankings from Associated Press poll

The 1979 Southeastern Louisiana Lions football team was an American football team that represented Southeastern Louisiana University as an NCAA Division II independent during the 1979 NCAA Division II football season. In their sixth year under head coach Billy Brewer, the team compiled an overall record of 6–5. Southeastern Louisiana played their home games on campus at Strawberry Stadium in Hammond, Louisiana.

Schedule

Date	Opponent	Site	Result	Attendance	Source
September 8	at McNeese State	Cowboy Stadium; Lake Charles, LA	L 7–10	20,000	
September 15	at Murray State	Roy Stewart Stadium; Murray, KY	W 19–11	10,500	
September 22	Southwest Texas State	Strawberry Stadium; Hammond, LA	L 7–14	8,000–9,000	
September 29	at Ball State	Ball State Stadium; Muncie, IN	L 7–17	16,013	
October 6	at Troy State	Veterans Memorial Stadium; Troy, AL	L 0–24	6,500	
October 13	Northwestern State	Strawberry Stadium; Hammond, LA (rivalry)	W 33–7	7,000	
October 20	at East Tennessee State	Memorial Center; Johnson City, TN	L 3–31	8,325	
October 27	Northeast Louisiana	Strawberry Stadium; Hammond, LA	W 13–0	7,500	
November 3	at Delta State	McCool Stadium; Cleveland, MS	W 30–7	2,931	
November 10	Nicholls State	Strawberry Stadium; Hammond, LA (rivalry)	W 38–0	4,000	
November 17	Mississippi College	Strawberry Stadium; Hammond, LA	W 34–14	4,000	
