= 1974 Nicholls State Colonels football team =

American college football season

1974 Nicholls State Colonels football
- Conference: Gulf South Conference
- Record: 5–6 (4–5 GSC)
- Head coach: Bill Clements (1st season)
- Home stadium: John L. Guidry Stadium

1974 Gulf South Conference football standings
	Conf.					Overall
Team	W		L		T	W		L		T
No. 7 Jacksonville State $	7	–	1	–	0	7	–	4	–	0
Delta State	7	–	2	–	0	8	–	3	–	0
No. 8 Livingston	5	–	3	–	0	8	–	3	–	0
Southeastern Louisiana	5	–	3	–	0	6	–	4	–	0
Troy State	4	–	4	–	0	6	–	4	–	0
North Alabama	4	–	4	–	0	4	–	6	–	0
Nicholls State	4	–	5	–	0	5	–	6	–	0
Northwestern State	1	–	6	–	0	1	–	10	–	0
Tennessee–Martin	1	–	7	–	0	2	–	9	–	0
Mississippi College	0	–	7	–	0	2	–	9	–	0
$ – Conference champion; Rankings from NAIA Division I poll

The 1974 Nicholls State Colonels football team represented Nicholls State University as a member of the Gulf South Conference (GSC) during the 1974 NCAA Division II football season. Led by first-year head coach Bill Clements, the Colonels compiled an overall record of 5–6 with a mark of 4–5 in conference play, placing seventh in the GSC. Nicholls State played home games at John L. Guidry Stadium in Thibodaux, Louisiana.

== Schedule ==
Date	Opponent	Site	Result	Attendance	Source
September 14	at Tennessee–Martin	Pacer Stadium; Martin, TN	W 16–14	5,500	
September 21	at No. 14 Jacksonville State	Paul Snow Stadium; Jacksonville, AL	L 0–29	7,200	
September 28	No. 9 Troy State	John L. Guidry Stadium; Thibodaux, LA	L 0–26	8,500	
October 5	Baptist Christian*	John L. Guidry Stadium; Thibodaux, LA	W 67–0	7,000	
October 12	at Northwestern State	Demon Stadium; Natchitoches, LA (rivalry)	W 7–0	5,000	
October 19	Mississippi College	John L. Guidry Stadium; Thibodaux, LA	W 21–12	8,750	
October 26	Livingston	John L. Guidry Stadium; Thibodaux, LA	L 19–33	5,500	
November 2	No. 12 McNeese State*	John L. Guidry Stadium; Thibodaux, LA	L 20–26	8,000	
November 9	at North Alabama	Braly Municipal Stadium; Florence, AL	L 8–17	6,000–7,000	
November 16	Southeastern Louisiana	John L. Guidry Stadium; Thibodaux, LA (rivalry)	W 10–0	9,000	
November 23	at Delta State	McCool Stadium; Cleveland, MS	L 14–19	3,100	
*Non-conference game; Rankings from AP Poll released prior to the game; Source:
