= Poultry Bowl =

Poultry Bowl (defunct)
- Stadium: World War Memorial Stadium
- Location: Greensboro, North Carolina
- Previous stadiums: Gainesville City Park (1973)
- Previous locations: Gainesville, Georgia
- Operated: 1973–1974

Sponsors
- None

The Poultry Bowl was an American college football bowl game played in 1973 and 1974 in Gainesville, Georgia and Greensboro, North Carolina. All teams involved were members of the National Association of Intercollegiate Athletics (NAIA) at the time of their participation.

The maiden game was played at Gainesville's City Park Complex on Saturday, December 8, 1973, between Stephen F. Austin and Gardner–Webb. The Stephen F. Austin Lumberjacks beat the Gardner–Webb Bulldogs, 31–10.

The bowl was aimed at small colleges that did not have opportunities to play in major bowl game. For the initial game, the selection committee also considered Elon Fightin' Christians football, Jacksonville State, Troy State, Grambling, Carson–Newman, and Jackson State before settling on Stephen F. Austin and Gardner–Webb.

The Lumberjacks' mobile quarterback Larry Mayer scored one touchdown and set up others. The halftime score was 10–3, but Stephen F. Austin dominated the second half, featuring long runs by Mayer, tailback John Reece, and fullback Bill Tyler. Gardner–Webb used their passing game to move the ball but couldn't keep up with the Lumberjacks. Unfortunately, cold rain fell two hours before kickoff and the crowd was estimated at only 1,000.

1973 was the first and only Poultry Bowl played in Gainesville. The game was played the following year at the historic World War Memorial Stadium in Greensboro, North Carolina. The 1974 tilt featured William Penn and Guilford. In 1974, Dennis Haglin took over the position of head coach at Guilford from Henry Vansant, who had resigned. The game ended in a 7–7 tie, but a tiebreaker was used, most first downs, and Guilford was given an 8–7 victory.

== Game results ==
Date	Winner		Loser		Notes
December 8, 1973	Stephen F. Austin	31	Gardner–Webb	10	
December 7, 1974	Guilford	8	William Penn	7	Guilford wins on tiebreaker–first downs
