= 1976 Jacksonville State Gamecocks football team =

American college football season

1976 Jacksonville State Gamecocks football
- Conference: Gulf South Conference
- Record: 6–4 (6–2 GSC)
- Head coach: Clarkie Mayfield (3rd season)
- Offensive coordinator: Jim Fuller (2nd season)
- Defensive coordinator: Joe Kines (4th season)
- Home stadium: Paul Snow Stadium

1976 Gulf South Conference football standings
	Conf.					Overall
Team	W		L		T	W		L		T
No. 6 Troy State $	7	–	1	–	0	8	–	1	–	1
Southeastern Louisiana	6	–	1	–	1	9	–	1	–	1
Jacksonville State	6	–	2	–	0	6	–	4	–	0
Tennessee–Martin	5	–	3	–	0	8	–	3	–	0
Livingston	5	–	3	–	0	5	–	5	–	0
North Alabama	3	–	4	–	1	4	–	5	–	1
Delta State	2	–	5	–	1	4	–	6	–	1
Nicholls State	2	–	5	–	1	4	–	6	–	1
Mississippi College	0	–	8	–	0	2	–	8	–	0
$ – Conference champion; Troy State's and Livingston's games against Alabama State, Jacksonville State's game against Alabama A&M, Tennessee–Martin's games against Austin Peay and Murray State, and Mississippi College's game against Ouachita Baptist were designated as conference games and counted in the Gulf South standings.; Rankings from AP Poll

The 1976 Jacksonville State Gamecocks football team represented Jacksonville State University as a member of the Gulf South Conference (GSC) during the 1976 NCAA Division II football season. Led by third-year head coach Clarkie Mayfield, the Gamecocks compiled an overall record of 6–4 with a mark of 6–2 in conference play, and finished third in the GSC.

== Schedule ==
Date	Opponent	Site	Result	Attendance	Source
September 11	at Alabama A&M (Note: Jacksonville State's game against Alabama A&M was designated as a conference game and counted in the Gulf South standings.)	Milton Frank Stadium; Huntsville, AL	W 30–7	9,800	
September 18	Nicholls State	Paul Snow Stadium; Jacksonville, AL	W 34–7	8,000	
September 25	at Tennessee–Martin	Pacer Stadium; Martin, TN	W 24–3	7,000	
October 2	Southeastern Louisiana	Paul Snow Stadium; Jacksonville, AL	L 3–13	8,100	
October 9	at Western Carolina*	Whitmire Stadium; Cullowhee, NC	L 13–14	6,500–6,720	
October 16	at Chattanooga*	Chamberlain Field; Chattanooga, TN	L 7–14	7,500	
October 30	Delta State	Paul Snow Stadium; Jacksonville, AL	W 24–14	6,200	
November 6	at Livingston	Tiger Stadium; Livingston, AL	W 24–7	7,200	
November 13	No. 8 Troy State	Paul Snow Stadium; Jacksonville, AL (rivalry)	L 16–19	10,000–10,300	
November 20	North Alabama	Paul Snow Stadium; Jacksonville, AL	W 28–7	5,000	
*Non-conference game; Rankings from AP Poll released prior to the game
