= Bill Bowman (American football) =

American football player (1931–2008)

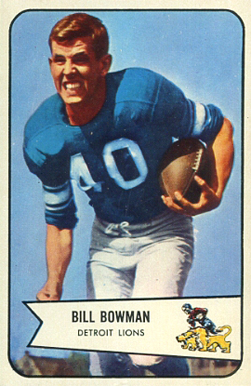
- 1954 Bowman football card

No. 33, 43, 49
- Position: Fullback

Personal information
- Born: September 22, 1931; Birmingham, Alabama, U.S.
- Died: February 7, 2008 (aged 76); Greeneville, Tennessee, U.S.
- Listed height: 6 ft 2 in (1.88 m)
- Listed weight: 215 lb (98 kg)

Career information
- College: William and Mary (1950–1953)
- NFL draft: 1954: 3rd round, 37th overall pick

Career history
- Detroit Lions (1954, 1956); San Francisco 49ers (1957)*; Pittsburgh Steelers (1957)
- * Offseason or practice squad member only

Awards and highlights
- First-team All-Southern (1953)

Career NFL statistics
- Rushing yards: 557
- Rushing average: 3.9
- Receptions: 50
- Receiving yards: 429
- Total touchdowns: 7
- Stats at Pro Football Reference

William Ekron Bowman Jr. (September 22, 1931 – February 7, 2008) was an American professional football player who was a fullback in the National Football League (NFL) for the Detroit Lions and the Pittsburgh Steelers.
