= Gary Weaver =

American football player (born 1949)

No. 52
- Position: Linebacker

Personal information
- Born: March 13, 1949 (age 77); Florence, Alabama, U.S.
- Listed height: 6 ft 1 in (1.85 m)
- Listed weight: 224 lb (102 kg)

Career information
- High school: Bradshaw (Florence)
- College: Trinidad; Fresno State
- NFL draft: 1973: 7th round, 179th overall pick

Career history
- Oakland Raiders (1973–1974); Green Bay Packers (1975–1979)

Career NFL statistics
- Games: 87
- Sacks: 5
- Fumble recoveries: 5
- Stats at Pro Football Reference

Gary Lynn Weaver (born March 13, 1949) is an American former professional football player who was a linebacker in the National Football League (NFL). Weaver was born on March 13, 1949, in Florence, Alabama, where he attended Bradshaw High School. After high school, he attended Trinidad State Junior College before transferring to Fresno State University, where he played for their Bulldogs football team.

Weaver was selected 179th overall in the seventh round of the 1973 NFL draft by the Oakland Raiders. After playing for two seasons, he was placed on waivers after the Raiders acquired Ted Hendricks in a trade with the Green Bay Packers. Ironically, the Packers claimed Weaver off of waivers as a potential replacement for Hendricks, even though the Raiders intention was to keep Weaver in the long run. With Weaver being claimed just a few days before the beginning of the season, he started off primarily as a back-up to fellow linebacker Tom Toner. Weaver transition to a starter and played for the Packers for five seasons.
