= Roland Dale =

American football player, coach, and administrator (1927–2012)

No. 82
- Position: End

Personal information
- Born: October 30, 1927; Magee, Mississippi, U.S.
- Died: April 23, 2012 (aged 84); Jackson, Mississippi, U.S.
- Listed height: 6 ft 3 in (1.91 m)
- Listed weight: 210 lb (95 kg)

Career information
- College: Ole Miss

Career history

Playing
- Washington Redskins (1950)

Coaching
- Southeastern Louisiana (1972–1973) Head coach

Operations
- Southern Miss (1974–1986) Athletic director

Career statistics
- Games played: 11
- Stats at Pro Football Reference

Head coaching record
- Career: 7–14 (.333) (college)

Roland Hall Dale Jr. (October 30, 1927 – April 23, 2012) was an American football player, coach, and college athletics administrator. He played professionally as an end in the National Football League (NFL) with the Washington Redskins for one season in 1950. He played college football at the University of Mississippi (Ole Miss).

Dale was the ninth head football coach at Southeastern Louisiana University in Hammond, Louisiana and he held that position for two seasons, from 1972 until 1973. His coaching record at Southeastern Louisiana was 7–14 Dale went on to become an athletic administrator, serving as athletic director at the University of Southern Mississippi from 1974 to 1986. He died on April 23, 2012.

== Head coaching record ==
| Year | Team | Overall | Conference | Standing | Bowl/playoffs |
|---|---|---|---|---|---|
Southeastern Louisiana Lions (Gulf South Conference) (1972–1973)
| 1972 | Southeastern Louisiana | 3–8 | 2–4 | 6th | |
| 1973 | Southeastern Louisiana | 4–6 | 3–4 | T–6th | |
| Southeastern Louisiana: | | 7–14 | 5–8 | | |
| Total: | | 7–14 | | | |
