= 1975 Troy State Trojans football team =

American college football season

1975 Troy State Trojans football
- Conference: Gulf South Conference
- Record: 6–4 (5–3 GSC)
- Head coach: Byrd Whigham (2nd season)
- Home stadium: Veterans Memorial Stadium

1975 Gulf South Conference football standings
	Conf.					Overall
Team	W		L		T	W		L		T
Nicholls State $	7	–	2	–	0	8	–	2	–	0
No. 6 Livingston ^	6	–	2	–	0	10	–	3	–	0
No. 11 Jacksonville State	5	–	3	–	0	7	–	3	–	0
Troy State	5	–	3	–	0	6	–	4	–	0
Delta State	5	–	4	–	0	6	–	4	–	0
North Alabama	4	–	4	–	0	6	–	4	–	0
Mississippi College	2	–	5	–	0	6	–	5	–	0
Southeastern Louisiana	2	–	6	–	0	4	–	7	–	0
Tennessee–Martin	1	–	7	–	0	2	–	8	–	0
$ – Conference champion; ^ – NCAA Division II playoff participant; Rankings from NCAA Division II AP poll for Livingston and NAIA Division I poll for Jacksonville State

The 1975 Troy State Trojans football team represented Troy State University (now known as Troy University) as a member of the Gulf South Conference (GSC) during the 1975 NCAA Division II football season. Led by second-year head coach Byrd Whigham, the Trojans compiled an overall record of 6–4 with a mark of 5–3 in conference play, and finished tied for third in the GSC.

== Schedule ==
Date	Opponent	Site	Result	Attendance	Source
September 13	Abilene Christian*	Rip Hewes Stadium; Dothan, AL	L 7–34	8,400	
September 20	at Alabama State*	Cramton Bowl; Montgomery, AL	W 13–10	12,000	
September 27	Nicholls State	Veterans Memorial Stadium; Troy, AL	L 13–17	5,000	
October 4	at Livingston	Tiger Stadium; Livingston, AL	W 17–14	5,000	
October 11	Southeastern Louisiana	Veterans Memorial Stadium; Troy, AL	W 26–7	3,000	
October 18	at Delta State	Delta Field; Cleveland, MS	L 25–31	6,200	
October 25	North Alabama^{†}	Veterans Memorial Stadium; Troy, AL	L 26–49	9,000	
November 1	at Northwestern State	State Fair Stadium; Shreveport, LA	W 24–0	792	
November 8	Tennessee–Martin	Veterans Memorial Stadium; Troy, AL	W 17–0	2,000	
November 15	Jacksonville State	Veterans Memorial Stadium; Troy, AL (rivalry)	W 26–10	7,000	
*Non-conference game; ^{†}Homecoming
