= 1974 Troy State Trojans football team =

American college football season

1974 Troy State Trojans football
- Conference: Gulf South Conference
- Record: 6–4 (4–4 GSC)
- Head coach: Byrd Whigham (1st season)
- Home stadium: Veterans Memorial Stadium

1974 Gulf South Conference football standings
| | Conf. | | | | | Overall |
| Team | W | | L | | T | W | | L | | T |
|---|---|---|---|---|---|---|---|---|---|---|
| No. 7 Jacksonville State $ | 7 | – | 1 | – | 0 | 7 | – | 4 | – | 0 |
| Delta State | 7 | – | 2 | – | 0 | 8 | – | 3 | – | 0 |
| No. 8 Livingston | 5 | – | 3 | – | 0 | 8 | – | 3 | – | 0 |
| Southeastern Louisiana | 5 | – | 3 | – | 0 | 6 | – | 4 | – | 0 |
| Troy State | 4 | – | 4 | – | 0 | 6 | – | 4 | – | 0 |
| North Alabama | 4 | – | 4 | – | 0 | 4 | – | 6 | – | 0 |
| Nicholls State | 4 | – | 5 | – | 0 | 5 | – | 6 | – | 0 |
| Northwestern State | 1 | – | 6 | – | 0 | 1 | – | 10 | – | 0 |
| Tennessee–Martin | 1 | – | 7 | – | 0 | 2 | – | 9 | – | 0 |
| Mississippi College | 0 | – | 7 | – | 0 | 2 | – | 9 | – | 0 |
$ – Conference champion; Rankings from NAIA Division I poll

The 1974 Troy State Trojans football team represented Troy State University (now known as Troy University) as a member of the Gulf South Conference (GSC) during the 1974 NCAA Division II football season. Led by first-year head coach Byrd Whigham, the Trojans compiled an overall record of 6–4 with a mark of 4–4 in conference play, and finished tied for fifth in the GSC.

== Schedule ==
| Date | Opponent | Rank | Site | Result | Attendance | Source |
|---|---|---|---|---|---|---|
| September 7 | Northwestern State | | Rip Hewes Stadium; Dothan, AL | W 28–6 | 7,500 | |
| September 14 | Northeast Louisiana* | | Veterans Memorial Stadium; Troy, AL | W 30–19 | 7,000 | |
| September 21 | at Alabama State* | No. 9 | Cramton Bowl; Montgomery, AL | W 28–14 | 15,000 | |
| September 28 | at Nicholls State | No. 9 | John L. Guidry Stadium; Thibodaux, LA | W 26–0 | 8,500 | |
| October 5 | Livingston | No. 7 | Veterans Memorial Stadium; Troy, AL | L 33–36 | 7,500 | |
| October 12 | at Southeastern Louisiana | No. 13 | Strawberry Stadium; Hammond, LA | L 25–35 | 9,000 | |
| October 19 | Delta State | | Veterans Memorial Stadium; Troy, AL | L 9–12 | 10,000 | |
| October 26 | at North Alabama | | Braly Municipal Stadium; Florence, AL | W 36–29 | 8,200–8,300 | |
| November 9 | at Tennessee–Martin | | Pacer Stadium; Martin, TN | W 47–35 | 7,000 | |
| November 16 | at Jacksonville State | | Paul Snow Stadium; Jacksonville, AL (rivalry) | L 12–23 | 8,500 | |
*Non-conference game; Rankings from AP Poll released prior to the game
