= Florence City Schools =

School district in Alabama, United States

Location
- Florence, Alabama; United States

District information
- Grades: Pre-K – 12th
- Superintendent: Jimmy Shaw

Students and staff
- Students: 4188
- Teachers: 235
- District mascot: Falcons
- Colors: Silver and blue

Other information
- Website: Official website

Florence City Schools is the public school district of the city of Florence, Alabama. As of the 2004–2005 school year it has some 4,188 students and 235 full-time teachers. As of 2023, Florence City Schools offers 27 Advanced Placement courses, 8 Pre-AP/Honors courses, approximately 60 career/tech courses, 90 fine arts courses, 14 competitive sports with 61 teams, and education from the "cradle to career."

Its boundaries parallel that of Florence city.

According to 2012 U.S. News Best High Schools, Florence City Schools was ranked #17 out of a total of 370 high schools in the state of Alabama placing them in the top 5% of Alabama schools.

== Schools ==
=== High schools ===
==== Grades 9-12 ====
- Florence High School
  - Used to be Bradshaw High School until the merge with Coffee High School in 2004
  - Notable Alumni include Beniquez Brown, Braxton Garrett, Erroll Thompson, Cole Henry, Grant Taylor, Kneeland Hibbett, and Evan Taylor

=== Middle schools ===
==== Grades 7–8 ====
- Florence Middle School
  - formerly Coffee High School until the merge with Bradshaw High School in 2004

=== Elementary schools ===
- Forest Hills Elementary School
- Harlan Elementary School
- Weeden Elementary School
- Hibbett Elementary School

=== Preschools ===
- W.C. Handy School. (The Handy Headstart program was officially removed as a part of the Florence City School System in October 2013 as part of the federal government shutdown and a lacking of federal funding. The program continues to operate, however.)

== Board of education ==
Board positions are on a 4-year election cycle.

2008: Ms. Vicky Kirkman (District 1), Mr. Bill Jordan (District 2), Mrs. MaLeah Chaney (District 3), Thomas F Wissert (District 4), Mrs. Laura Hardeman (District 5), Mr. Jim Fisher (District 6)

2012: Ms. Vicky Kirkman (District 1), Mr. Bill Jordan (District 2), Mr. Bill Griffin (District 3), Mr. Bill Gullett (District 4), Mrs. Laura Hardeman (District 5), Mr. Brad Dethero, appointed (District 6)

2016: Ms. Vicky Kirkman (District 1), Mr. Bill Jordan (District 2), Mr. Bill Griffin (District 3), Mr. Bill Gullett (District 4), Mrs. Laura Hardeman (District 5), Mrs. Britton Watson (District 6)
