= Bruce Bosley =

American football player (1933–1995)

- Bosley in 1961

No. 77
- Positions: Guard, center, defensive end

Personal information
- Born: November 5, 1933; Fresno, California, U.S.
- Died: April 26, 1995 (aged 61); San Francisco, California, U.S.
- Listed height: 6 ft 2 in (1.88 m)
- Listed weight: 225 lb (102 kg)

Career information
- High school: Green Bank (Green Bank, West Virginia)
- College: West Virginia
- NFL draft: 1956: 2nd round, 15th overall pick

Career history
- San Francisco 49ers (1956–1968); Atlanta Falcons (1969)

Awards and highlights
- 4× Second-team All-Pro (1959–1961, 1966); 4× Pro Bowl (1960, 1965–1967); Consensus All-American (1955); 2× First-team All-Southern (1953, 1954); West Virginia Mountaineers No. 77 retired

Career NFL statistics
- Games played: 175
- Games started: 156
- Fumble recoveries: 7
- Stats at Pro Football Reference
- College Football Hall of Fame

Bruce Lee Bosley (November 5, 1933 – April 26, 1995) was an American professional football player who was a guard and center for 14 seasons with the San Francisco 49ers and the Atlanta Falcons of the National Football League (NFL). He was selected to four Pro Bowls (1960, 1965–1967), and was named All-Pro four times (1959–1961, 1966). He played college football for the West Virginia Mountaineers (WVU). He was inducted into the College Football Hall of Fame in 1982.

== Early life ==
Bosley was born on November 5, 1933, in Fresno, California. He attended Green Bank High School in Green Bank, West Virginia (1948-52). Bosley was a third-team Class B All-State fullback at Green Bank High School, and played in the North-South High School All-Star game. He was recruited to WVU to play football for the Mountaineers by head coach Art "Pappy" Lewis, who first saw Bosley playing high school basketball.

In 1956, Green Bank High School honored Bosley and presented him with a bronze plaque, reading "'Our all-American Bruce Bosley, Green Bank High School 1948-1952; West Virginia University 1952-1956. In deep appreciation of a job well done as a student and an athlete. Green Bank High School.'"

== Collegiate career ==
Bosley played from 1952-55 at WVU. He was a two-way tackle. Bosley was an immediate starter his freshman year, and contributed to West Virginia going from 5–5 in 1951 to 7–2 in 1952. In 1954, after a dominating performance against Penn State, Bosley was named Associated Press (AP) Player of the Week. His WVU teams defeated Penn State three consecutive times, with Bosley being named the AP's National Lineman of the Week in two of those games. In 1953, he was selected second team All-American by the International News Service. He played in the 1954 Sugar Bowl, a 42–19 loss to Georgia Tech.

He went on to earn consensus All-America honors as a senior in 1955, only the second WVU player to do so at the time. In 1955, he was also selected captain of the All-Southern Conference team. West Virginia won 31 of 38 games Bosley played in during his four seasons from 1952 to 1955. One of his teammates during those years was fellow two-way lineman and future College Football Hall of Fame and Pro Football Hall of Fame member Sam Huff. In 1955, he was a WVU team captain, along with Huff and Fred Wyant. At the time of their graduation in 1955, some thought Bosley to be the better player over Huff.

Bosley also was an Academic All-American with a degree in chemical engineering. He was invited to play in the College Football All-Star Game, the North-South Game and the Senior Bowl. He made 12 different All-America teams in 1955, including the All-Players team, being chosen by 93% of the opposing players voting.

== Professional career ==
Bosley with the 49ers.

The San Francisco 49ers made Bruce Bosley their second-round selection in the 1956 NFL draft (15th overall). Bosley played his entire rookie season at defensive end.

By 1957, Bosley switched to offensive line and was the team's starting left guard, being named second team All-Pro in 1959 by the AP, and earning his first Pro Bowl berth in 1960. In 1960, both the Newspaper Enterprise Association (NEA) and United Press International (UPI) named him second team All-Pro; and the NEA did so again in 1961. In 1962, when the team was searching for a center after an injury to starter Frank Morze, All-Pro guard Bosley started at center. Morze left the 49ers in November to join the Cleveland Browns, and Bosley was San Francisco's center for the next six years. Bosley was named to the Pro Bowl again in 1965 and was honored two more times in 1966 and 1967. The NEA named him second team All-Pro in 1966.

Bosley spent another season with the 49ers in 1968, starting all 14 games, and a year with the Atlanta Falcons in 1969, starting in nine games before retiring. During his time in San Francisco, Bosley played alongside 1960s All-Decade team member guard Howard Mudd, and on the same line with future hall of fame tackle Bob St. Clair.

== Post-football ==
By 1967, Bosley was cultivating his other passion: restoring old homes. NFL Films visited his Hillsborough W.S. Crocker Estate carriage house for a show called “They Lead Two Lives,” which chronicled his career as both a star football player and respected home builder.

During the next 11 years he remodeled two other estates in Hillsborough as president of Interior Design, a home building, remodeling, interior decorating, furnishing and real-estate company.

== Personal life ==
Bosley became part-owner of a wholesale electrical supply house in addition to his home remodeling business and was also known for his civic and charitable activities in San Francisco. Outside of football, he was a member of the board of directors for the San Francisco Annex for Cultural Arts, the mayor's committee for the San Francisco Council for the Performing Arts, and a long-time volunteer role with both the San Francisco Film Festival and the San Francisco Ballet.

Bosley also served a stint as the president of the NFL Alumni Association, and established the NFL Alumni San Francisco Chapter, working 16–17 hours a day fundraising for it. The chapter's focus was to create programs for children. He was called "the lifeblood of the charity" by his executive assistant. In 1999, the chapter posthumously dedicated its new headquarters at the Bruce Bosley Memorial Building in Redwood City.

== Death ==
He lived in San Francisco, or San Mateo, until his death from a heart attack on April 26, 1995. He was attending a United Way awards dinner, sitting at the head table with NFL hall of famer Jerry Rice whom Bosley had recruited as a host, when stricken.

== Legacy ==
Bosley is listed on the San Francisco 49ers “Golden Era” team from 1946 to 1969 and he was named to the college football's 75th Silver Anniversary Team in 1981.

In 1982, Bosley was inducted as a member of the College Football Hall of Fame. He was a part of West Virginia University's second Sports Hall of Fame induction class of 1992, and had his number 77 retired by the school in a pregame ceremony on September 3, 2016.

He was named the state of West Virginia's 30th greatest sports figure in a poll conducted by CNNSI.com.
