= 1974 Jacksonville State Gamecocks football team =

American college football season

1974 Jacksonville State Gamecocks football

GSC champion
- Conference: Gulf South Conference
- Record: 7–4 (7–1 GSC)
- Head coach: Clarkie Mayfield (1st season)
- Defensive coordinator: Joe Kines (2nd season)
- Home stadium: Paul Snow Stadium

1974 Gulf South Conference football standings
	Conf.					Overall
Team	W		L		T	W		L		T
No. 7 Jacksonville State $	7	–	1	–	0	7	–	4	–	0
Delta State	7	–	2	–	0	8	–	3	–	0
No. 8 Livingston	5	–	3	–	0	8	–	3	–	0
Southeastern Louisiana	5	–	3	–	0	6	–	4	–	0
Troy State	4	–	4	–	0	6	–	4	–	0
North Alabama	4	–	4	–	0	4	–	6	–	0
Nicholls State	4	–	5	–	0	5	–	6	–	0
Northwestern State	1	–	6	–	0	1	–	10	–	0
Tennessee–Martin	1	–	7	–	0	2	–	9	–	0
Mississippi College	0	–	7	–	0	2	–	9	–	0
$ – Conference champion; Rankings from NAIA Division I poll

The 1974 Jacksonville State Gamecocks football team represented Jacksonville State University as a member of the Gulf South Conference (GSC) during the 1974 NCAA Division II football season. Led by first-year head coach Clarkie Mayfield, the Gamecocks compiled an overall record of 7–4 with a mark of 7–1 in conference play, and finished as GSC champion.

== Schedule ==
Date	Opponent	Site	Result	Attendance	Source
September 14	at Texas A&I*	Javelina Stadium; Kingsville, TX	L 19–20	10,000	
September 21	Nicholls State	Paul Snow Stadium; Jacksonville, AL	W 29–0	7,200	
September 28	at Tennessee–Martin	Pacer Stadium; Martin, TN	W 17–0	4,500	
October 5	Southeastern Louisiana	Paul Snow Stadium; Jacksonville, AL	W 22–10	8,800	
October 19	at Chattanooga*	Chamberlain Field; Chattanooga, TN	L 9–13	9,328	
October 26	Northwestern State^{†}	Paul Snow Stadium; Jacksonville, AL	W 36–13	10,125	
November 2	Delta State	Paul Snow Stadium; Jacksonville, AL	W 30–13	9,250	
November 9	at Northeast Louisiana*	Brown Stadium; Monroe, LA	L 16–20	8,200	
November 16	Troy State	Paul Snow Stadium; Jacksonville, AL (rivalry)	W 23–12	8,500	
November 23	North Alabama	Paul Snow Stadium; Jacksonville, AL	L 24–28	5,000–5,500	
November 28	at Livingston	Tiger Stadium; Livingston, AL	W 27–9	4,500	
*Non-conference game; ^{†}Homecoming
