= 1976 Troy State Trojans football team =

American college football season

1976 Troy State Trojans football

GSC champion
- Conference: Gulf South Conference
- Record: 8–1–1 (7–1 GSC)
- Head coach: Charlie Bradshaw (1st season)
- Home stadium: Veterans Memorial Stadium

1976 Gulf South Conference football standings
	Conf.					Overall
Team	W		L		T	W		L		T
No. 6 Troy State $	7	–	1	–	0	8	–	1	–	1
Southeastern Louisiana	6	–	1	–	1	9	–	1	–	1
Jacksonville State	6	–	2	–	0	6	–	4	–	0
Tennessee–Martin	5	–	3	–	0	8	–	3	–	0
Livingston	5	–	3	–	0	5	–	5	–	0
North Alabama	3	–	4	–	1	4	–	5	–	1
Delta State	2	–	5	–	1	4	–	6	–	1
Nicholls State	2	–	5	–	1	4	–	6	–	1
Mississippi College	0	–	8	–	0	2	–	8	–	0
$ – Conference champion; Troy State's and Livingston's games against Alabama State, Jacksonville State's game against Alabama A&M, Tennessee–Martin's games against Austin Peay and Murray State, and Mississippi College's game against Ouachita Baptist were designated as conference games and counted in the Gulf South standings.; Rankings from AP Poll

The 1976 Troy State Trojans football team represented Troy State University (now known as Troy University) as a member of the Gulf South Conference (GSC) during the 1976 NCAA Division II football season. Led by first-year head coach Charlie Bradshaw, the Trojans compiled an overall record of 8–1–1 with a mark of 7–1 in conference play, and finished as GSC champion.

== Schedule ==
Date	Time	Opponent	Rank	Site	Result	Attendance	Source
September 4		Angelo State*		Rip Hewes Stadium; Dothan, AL	W 38–9	6,000	
September 11		at Western Kentucky*		L. T. Smith Stadium; Bowling Green, KY	T 10–10	16,750	
September 18	7:30 p.m.	at Alabama State (Note: Troy State's game against Alabama State was designated as a conference game and counted in the Gulf South standings.)		Cramton Bowl; Montgomery, AL	W 17–16	13,500	.
September 25		at Nicholls State		John L. Guidry Stadium; Thibodaux, LA	W 14–9	11,500	
October 2		Livingston	No. 9	Veterans Memorial Stadium; Troy, AL	W 17–9	8,600	
October 9		at Southeastern Louisiana	No. 4	Strawberry Stadium; Hammond, LA	L 7–21	8,300	
October 16		Delta State		Veterans Memorial Stadium; Troy, AL	W 29–20	6,000	
October 23		at North Alabama		Braly Municipal Stadium; Florence, AL	W 17–3	3,500	
November 6		Mississippi College	No. 10	Veterans Memorial Stadium; Troy, AL	W 38–6	10,000	
November 13		at Jacksonville State	No. 8	Paul Snow Stadium; Jacksonville, AL (rivalry)	W 19–16	10,000–10,300	
*Non-conference game; Rankings from AP Poll released prior to the game; All times are in Central time
