= 1975 Jacksonville State Gamecocks football team =

American college football season

1975 Jacksonville State Gamecocks football
- Conference: Gulf South Conference
- Record: 7–3 (5–3 GSC)
- Head coach: Clarkie Mayfield (2nd season)
- Offensive coordinator: Jim Fuller (1st season)
- Defensive coordinator: Joe Kines (3rd season)
- Home stadium: Paul Snow Stadium

1975 Gulf South Conference football standings
	Conf.					Overall
Team	W		L		T	W		L		T
Nicholls State $	7	–	2	–	0	8	–	2	–	0
No. 6 Livingston ^	6	–	2	–	0	10	–	3	–	0
No. 11 Jacksonville State	5	–	3	–	0	7	–	3	–	0
Troy State	5	–	3	–	0	6	–	4	–	0
Delta State	5	–	4	–	0	6	–	4	–	0
North Alabama	4	–	4	–	0	6	–	4	–	0
Mississippi College	2	–	5	–	0	6	–	5	–	0
Southeastern Louisiana	2	–	6	–	0	4	–	7	–	0
Tennessee–Martin	1	–	7	–	0	2	–	8	–	0
$ – Conference champion; ^ – NCAA Division II playoff participant; Rankings from NCAA Division II AP poll for Livingston and NAIA Division I poll for Jacksonville State

The 1975 Jacksonville State Gamecocks football team represented Jacksonville State University as a member of the Gulf South Conference (GSC) during the 1975 NCAA Division II football season. Led by second-year head coach Clarkie Mayfield, the Gamecocks compiled an overall record of 7–3 with a mark of 5–3 in conference play, and finished tied for third in the GSC.

== Schedule ==
Date	Opponent	Site	Result	Attendance	Source
September 13	Alabama A&M*	Paul Snow Stadium; Jacksonville, AL	W 42–0	11,240	
September 20	at Nicholls State	John L. Guidry Stadium; Thibodaux, LA	L 6–18	8,500	
September 27	Chattanooga*	Paul Snow Stadium; Jacksonville, AL	W 24–6	8,500–8,950	
October 4	at Southeastern Louisiana	Strawberry Stadium; Hammond, LA	W 38–7	8,100	
October 18	Tennessee–Martin	Paul Snow Stadium; Jacksonville, AL	W 11–3	9,200	
October 25	at Northwestern State*	State Fair Stadium; Shreveport, LA	W 21–0	382	
November 1	at Delta State	Delta Field; Cleveland, MS	W 21–7	5,000	
November 8	Livingston	Paul Snow Stadium; Jacksonville, AL	W 17–13	10,830	
November 15	at Troy State	Veterans Memorial Stadium; Troy, AL (rivalry)	L 10–26	7,000	
November 22	at North Alabama	Braly Municipal Stadium; Florence, AL	L 14–21	5,000	
*Non-conference game
