= Pat Swoopes =

American football player (born 1964)

No. 69, 67
- Position: Defensive tackle

Personal information
- Born: March 4, 1964 (age 62); Florence, Alabama, U.S.
- Listed height: 6 ft 4 in (1.93 m)
- Listed weight: 280 lb (127 kg)

Career information
- High school: Bradshaw (Florence)
- College: Mississippi State
- NFL draft: 1986: 11th round, 284th overall pick

Career history
- New Orleans Saints (1986)*; (1987); (1988)*; Hamilton Tiger-Cats (1988); New Orleans Saints (1989); Washington Redskins (1990)*; Kansas City Chiefs (1991); Miami Dolphins (1991)
- * Offseason or practice squad member only

Awards and highlights
- First-team All-SEC (1984)
- Stats at Pro Football Reference

Patrick Roaman Swoopes (born March 4, 1964) is an American former professional football defensive tackle. He played for the New Orleans Saints in 1987 and 1989, the Hamilton Tiger-Cats in 1988 and the Kansas City Chiefs and Miami Dolphins in 1991.
