= 1973 Jacksonville State Gamecocks football team =

American college football season

1973 Jacksonville State Gamecocks football
- Conference: Gulf South Conference
- Record: 7–2 (5–2 GSC)
- Head coach: Charley Pell (5th season)
- Offensive coordinator: Clarkie Mayfield (5th season)
- Defensive coordinator: Joe Kines (1st season)
- Home stadium: Paul Snow Stadium

1973 Gulf South Conference football standings
	Conf.					Overall
Team	W		L		T	W		L		T
No. T–17 Troy State $	6	–	1	–	0	7	–	2	–	1
No. 4 Jacksonville State	5	–	2	–	0	7	–	2	–	0
Delta State	6	–	3	–	0	8	–	3	–	0
Livingston	4	–	3	–	1	6	–	3	–	1
Northwestern State	3	–	4	–	0	5	–	6	–	0
Mississippi College	3	–	4	–	0	4	–	6	–	0
Southeastern Louisiana	3	–	4	–	0	4	–	6	–	0
Florence State	3	–	6	–	0	4	–	6	–	0
Nicholls State	2	–	7	–	0	2	–	9	–	0
Tennessee–Martin	1	–	5	–	1	2	–	8	–	1
$ – Conference champion; Rankings from NAIA Division I poll

The 1973 Jacksonville State Gamecocks football team represented Jacksonville State University as a member of the Gulf South Conference (GSC) during the 1973 NCAA Division II football season. Led by fifth-year head coach Charley Pell, the Gamecocks compiled an overall record of 7–2 with a mark of 5–2 in conference play, and finished second in the GSC.

== Schedule ==
Date	Opponent	Site	Result	Attendance	Source
September 8	Texas A&I*	Paul Snow Stadium; Jacksonville, AL	W 34–14		
September 15	at Nicholls State	John L. Guidry Stadium; Thibodaux, LA	W 28–10	8,300	
September 22	Tennessee–Martin	Paul Snow Stadium; Jacksonville, AL	W 50–7		
October 6	Livingston	Paul Snow Stadium; Jacksonville, AL	L 20–21		
October 13	at Southeastern Louisiana	Strawberry Stadium; Hammond, LA	L 10–11		
October 27	at Delta State	Delta Field; Cleveland, MS	W 31–24		
November 3	Northeast Louisiana*	Paul Snow Stadium; Jacksonville, AL	W 66–24	10,400–13,000	
November 10	at Troy State	Veterans Memorial Stadium; Troy, AL (rivalry)	W 38–14	8,100	
November 17	at Florence State	Braly Municipal Stadium; Florence, AL	W 42–12		
*Non-conference game
