= 1954 All-Southern Conference football team =

The 1954 All-Southern Conference football team consists of American football players chosen by the Associated Press (AP) and United Press (UP) for the All-Southern Conference football team for the 1954 college football season.

== All-Southern Conference selections ==
=== Backs ===
- Fred Wyant, West Virginia (AP-1; UP-1)
- Joe Marconi, West Virginia (AP-1; UP-1)
- Dickie Beard, Virginia Tech (AP-1; UP-1)
- Johnny Popson, Furman (AP-1; UP-1)

=== Ends ===
- Tom Petty, Virginia Tech (AP-1; UP-1)
- Richie Gaskell, George Washington (AP-1)
- Billy Hillen, West Virginia (UP-1)

=== Tackles ===
- Bruce Bosley, West Virginia (AP-1; UP-1)
- George Preas, Virginia Tech (AP-1; UP-1)

=== Guards ===
- Gene Lamone, West Virginia (AP-1; UP-1)
- Billy Kerfoot, Virginia Tech (AP-1)
- Webster Williams, Furman (UP-1)

=== Centers ===
- Chick Donaldson, West Virginia (AP-1; UP-1)

== Key ==
AP = Associated Press

UP = United Press

== See also ==
- 1954 College Football All-America Team
