= George Preas =

American football player (1933–2007)

- Preas in 1961

No. 60
- Positions: Tackle, guard, linebacker

Personal information
- Born: June 25, 1933; Roanoke, Virginia, U.S.
- Died: February 24, 2007 (aged 73); Roanoke, Virginia, U.S.
- Listed height: 6 ft 2 in (1.88 m)
- Listed weight: 244 lb (111 kg)

Career information
- College: Virginia Tech
- NFL draft: 1955: 5th round, 51st overall pick

Career history
- Baltimore Colts (1955–1965)

Awards and highlights
- 2× NFL champion (1958, 1959); Second-team All-Pro (1964); 2× First-team All-Southern (1953, 1954); Virginia Tech Sports Hall of Fame; Virginia Sports Hall of Fame

Career NFL statistics
- Games played: 140
- Games started: 126
- Fumble recoveries: 8
- Stats at Pro Football Reference

George Robert Preas Sr. (/priːz/ PREEZ; June 25, 1933 – February 24, 2007) was an American professional football lineman in the National Football League (NFL). A graduate of Virginia Tech, Preas went on to have an 11-year career playing exclusively for the Baltimore Colts.

Preas won two NFL titles while playing for the Colts, starting at right offensive tackle in both the 1958 and 1959 NFL Championship games.

== Biography ==
=== Early life ===
George Preas was born June 25, 1933, in Roanoke, Virginia. He grew up in that city, attending Jefferson High School, where he played high school football and wrestled. Preas excelled in both sports, winning three Virginia state wrestling championships as well as being selected an All-State football player.

He graduated in 1951.

=== College career ===
He went on to star at Virginia Tech (VPI). During his college career, Preas was used offensively as a guard, playing as a lineman on the defensive side of the ball under the one-platoon system used in college football during the 1953 and 1954 seasons. He was elected team captain of the 1954 Virginia Tech squad.

Preas was instrumental in helping to turn the Virginia Tech Hokies football program around, with the winless team of 1950 emerging in Preas' senior year with a 8–0–1 record and a ranking of 16th best team in the country in the final 1954 AP poll.

Preas was named a member of the All-Southern Conference team at the end of his 1954 senior year. He started 40 consecutive games during his college career and was named Virginia collegiate football player of the year by the Roanoke Touchdown Club.

Preas was also chosen to play in the 1954 Blue-Gray All-Star game, in which he started.

While at VPI, Preas earned his degree in business administration.

=== Professional career ===
He was drafted by the Baltimore Colts in the 1955 NFL draft, selected by the team in the 5th round as the 55th overall selection. During his first two years in the league, the Colts tried Preas at various positions, splitting time at guard and tackle on the offensive side of the ball as well as giving him game snaps at defensive end.

Preas started 10 games at offensive left tackle in 1956 before being moved right tackle for the 1957 season. He would remain in that position for the rest of his career.

His first NFL head coach, Weeb Ewbank, saw Preas as a somewhat raw but promising player, who made up with effort what he lacked in experience. "His techniques leave a lot to be desired," Ewbank said in 1958, "but he gets the job done. He has more second effort than is good for him sometimes. On any of our long runs, look who is downfield blocking — it is always Preas. He may not get his man but he will be down there throwing blocks and trying all the time."

During his career, Preas won two championship rings as a member of the Colts, helping to protect star quarterback Johnny Unitas in the 1958 and 1959 NFL Championship games.

Preas earned his top league individual honor in 1964, when he was named a second team All-Pro. This paved the way for his richest payday in the NFL, a contract signed with the Colts ahead of the 1965 NFL season that paid him $15,000. It would be he final season in the league.

=== Life after football ===
After he left football, Preas was active in the world of business, owning a dairy franchise, a restaurant in Roanoke, Virginia, a motor inn, a shopping center called Piccadilly Square, and a number of office buildings. During his free time he collected art.

=== Death and legacy ===
Preas was diagnosed with Parkinson's disease, a chronic, degenerative brain disorder in 1989, when he was 56 years old. Traumatic brain injuries are strongly implicated as a risk factor for the disease.

He died in the South Roanoke Nursing Home of Parkinson's on February 24, 2007, at the age of 73. He was survived by his wife, Betty Joyce, and two children.

Preas was inducted as a member of the Virginia Tech Sports Hall of Fame in 1983, the second year Tech honored its former athletes.
