= Clarkie Mayfield =

American football player and coach (1941–1977)

Biographical details
- Born: October 11, 1941
- Died: May 28, 1977 (aged 35); Southgate, Kentucky, U.S.

Playing career
- 1960–1962: Kentucky
- Positions: Halfback, placekicker

Coaching career (HC unless noted)
- 1963–1966: LaRue County HS (KY) (assistant)
- 1967–1968: Franklin-Simpson HS (KY) (assistant)
- 1969–1973: Jacksonville State (OC/QB/RB)
- 1974–1976: Jacksonville State

Head coaching record
- Overall: 22–11 (college)

Accomplishments and honors

Championships
- 1 GSC (1974)

Herman Clark Mayfield (October 11, 1941 – May 28, 1977) was an American football player and coach. He served as the head football coach at Jacksonville State University in Jacksonville, Alabama, from 1974 to 1976, compiling a record of 22–11.

As a player at the University of Kentucky in 1962, Mayfield's field goal clinched a victory against Tennessee in the season's final game. He died on May 28, 1977, in the Beverly Hills Supper Club fire in Southgate, Kentucky.

== Head coaching record ==
=== College ===
Year	Team	Overall	Conference	Standing	Bowl/playoffs
Jacksonville State Gamecocks (Gulf South Conference) (1974–1976)
1974	Jacksonville State	7–4	7–1	1st	
1975	Jacksonville State	7–3	5–3	T–3rd	
1976	Jacksonville State	6–4	6–2	3rd	
Jacksonville State:		22–11	18–6		
Total:		22–11			
National championship Conference title Conference division title or championship game berth
