= Byrd Whigham =

American baseball player and football coach (1933–2017)

Biographical details
- Born: June 12, 1933
- Died: October 22, 2017 (aged 84)

Playing career

Basketball
- 1953–1955: Auburn

Baseball
- 1954–1955: Auburn
- 1956: Graceville Oilers
- Positions: Guard (basketball); Pitcher (baseball)

Coaching career (HC unless noted)

Football
- 1957–1964: Wildwood HS (FL)
- 1965–1966: Melbourne HS (FL)
- 1967–1968: Auburn (assistant)
- 1969–1970: Georgia (freshmen)
- 1971–1973: Georgia (assistant)
- 1974–1975: Troy State

Administrative career (AD unless noted)
- 1957–1965: Wildwood HS (FL)

Head coaching record
- Overall: 12–8 (college); 90–12–2 (high school)

Robert Byrd Whigham (June 13, 1933 – October 22, 2017) was an American minor league baseball player and college football coach. He served as the head football coach at Troy State University—now known as Troy University—from 1974 to 1975.

== Head coaching record ==
=== College ===
Year	Team	Overall	Conference	Standing	Bowl/playoffs
Troy State Trojans (Gulf South Conference) (1974–1975)
1974	Troy State	6–4	4–4	T–5th	
1975	Troy State	6–4	5–3	T–3rd	
Troy State:		12–8	9–7		
Total:		12–8			
