= 1973 Troy State Trojans football team =

American college football season

1973 Troy State Trojans football

GSC champion
- Conference: Gulf South Conference

Ranking
- Coaches: No. T-17
- Record: 7–2–1 (6–1 GSC)
- Head coach: Tom Jones (2nd season)
- Home stadium: Veterans Memorial Stadium

1973 Gulf South Conference football standings
	Conf.					Overall
Team	W		L		T	W		L		T
No. T–17 Troy State $	6	–	1	–	0	7	–	2	–	1
No. 4 Jacksonville State	5	–	2	–	0	7	–	2	–	0
Delta State	6	–	3	–	0	8	–	3	–	0
Livingston	4	–	3	–	1	6	–	3	–	1
Northwestern State	3	–	4	–	0	5	–	6	–	0
Mississippi College	3	–	4	–	0	4	–	6	–	0
Southeastern Louisiana	3	–	4	–	0	4	–	6	–	0
Florence State	3	–	6	–	0	4	–	6	–	0
Nicholls State	2	–	7	–	0	2	–	9	–	0
Tennessee–Martin	1	–	5	–	1	2	–	8	–	1
$ – Conference champion; Rankings from NAIA Division I poll

The 1973 Troy State Trojans football team represented Troy State University (now known as Troy University) as a member of the Gulf South Conference (GSC) during the 1973 NCAA Division II football season. Led by second-year head coach Tom Jones, the Trojans compiled an overall record of 7–2–1 with a mark of 6–1 in conference play, winning the GSC title.

== Schedule ==
Date	Opponent	Rank	Site	Result	Attendance	Source
September 8	at Northeast Louisiana*		Brown Stadium; Monroe, LA	T 15–15	8,350–8,400	
September 13	vs. Livingston		Cramton Bowl; Montgomery, AL	W 7–6	8,000	
September 22	Nicholls State		Rip Hewes Stadium; Dothan, AL	W 42–7	6,500	
September 29	at Ouachita Baptist*		Arkadelphia, AR	W 17–7	600	
October 6	Southeastern Louisiana		Veterans Memorial Stadium; Troy, AL	W 24–0	7,000	
October 13	at Delta State	No. 12	Delta Field; Cleveland, MS	W 17–10	3,750	
October 20	Florence State	No. 14	Veterans Memorial Stadium; Troy, AL	W 36–7	8,300	
October 27	at McNeese State*	No. 13	Cowboy Stadium; Lake Charles, LA	L 6–21	12,000	
November 3	Tennessee–Martin		Veterans Memorial Stadium; Troy, AL	W 30–0	5,000	
November 10	No. 15 Jacksonville State		Veterans Memorial Stadium; Troy, AL (rivalry)	L 14–38	8,100	
*Non-conference game; Rankings from Coaches' Poll released prior to the game
