= Fred Wyant =

American football player and official (1934–2021)

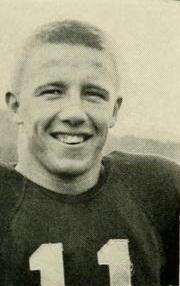
- Wyant from The 1955 Monticola

No. 11, 87
- Position: Quarterback

Personal information
- Born: April 26, 1934; Weston, West Virginia, U.S.
- Died: March 20, 2021 (aged 86); Morgantown, West Virginia, U.S.
- Listed height: 6 ft 0 in (1.83 m)
- Listed weight: 200 lb (91 kg)

Career information
- High school: Weston
- College: West Virginia (1952–1955)
- NFL draft: 1956: 3rd round, 36th overall pick

Career history
- Washington Redskins (1956); Toronto Argonauts (1957)

Awards and highlights
- 2× First-team All-Southern (1953, 1954)

Career NFL statistics
- Passing attempts: 2
- Passing completions: 1
- Completion percentage: 50.0%
- TD–INT: 0–0
- Passing yards: 17
- Passer rating: 79.2
- Stats at Pro Football Reference

Frederick Mount Wyant Jr. (April 26, 1934 – March 20, 2021) was an American professional football quarterback who went on to serve as an official in the National Football League (NFL) for 27 years from 1966 through 1992, with 19 of those years (1971–1989) as a referee. Wyant originally wore number 75 as an official before switching to number 11, which he wore as a player, in 1983. (He also wore #11 from 1979 through 1981, when officials were numbered separately by position, instead of together as a pool. In 1983, he switched to #11 to also honor fellow official Vince Jacob, who died during the 1982 NFLPA strike while still in active service. Jacob, the side judge on Wyant's crew in 1980, 1981 and the first two games of 1982, wore #11 from 1975-78 and again in 1982).

== Early life ==
Wyant was a three-sport star in football, baseball and basketball for Weston High School in Weston, West Virginia and later attended West Virginia University (WVU) from 1952 to 1955, where he became one of the greatest quarterbacks in Mountaineer history. He was starting quarterback in his freshman year at WVU. He ranks among the WVU career top ten in total offense (3,426), passing yardage (2,663), pass attempts (401), and touchdown passes (20). Wyant's record as a starter was 30–4 and led the Mountaineers to the 1954 Sugar Bowl. In addition to playing football at WVU, Wyant participated in one successful season of baseball, batting a percentage of .406. During his career at WVU, Wyant was a three time Academic All-American, earning his degree from WVU in Chemical Engineering.

== Professional career ==
Wyant would later have a career in the NFL as he was drafted in the third round (36th overall pick) of the 1956 NFL draft by the Washington Redskins. He played one season for the Redskins, becoming a member of the Toronto Argonauts of the Canadian Football League (CFL) the following year where he played one season.

== Years as an Official ==
Following his playing days, Wyant worked as a high school and small college football official for three years, then as a major college football official for five years, before becoming an official in the NFL as a line judge in 1966. Wyant was promoted to referee in 1971 upon the retirement of Walt Fitzgerald. Along with fellow veteran referee Ben Dreith, he was demoted to line judge in 1990 and retired from officiating two years later.

Wyant was notable for his perspective of the NFL as outlined in Rene A. Henry's book, "Offsides." Wyant was the referee in the 1981 AFC divisional playoff game between Miami and San Diego, a game won by the Chargers, 41–38 in overtime. This game would become known in NFL lore as "The Epic in Miami".

Wyant and his wife Dolores, resided in Morgantown, West Virginia. They had three children and three grandchildren. After months of deteriorating health, Wyant died March 20, 2021, at the age of 86.

== Honors ==
- West Virginia University Sports Hall of Fame

== Books ==
- Offsides! - Fred Wyant's Provocative Look Inside the National Football League Rene A Henry, Xlibris, ISBN 0-7388-0973-X
