= Coffee High School (Alabama) =

Public school in Florence, Alabama, US

- Florence, Alabama; United States

Information
- Type: Public high school
- Opened: 1914
- Closed: 2004

Coffee High School was a public high school established in 1914 in Florence, Alabama. After the 2003–2004 school year, the school merged with Bradshaw High School to form Florence Middle School.

== History ==
Coffee High School was founded in 1914 as the first public high school in Florence. Classes were first held in a rented antebellum home on North Pine Street, in the Sannoner Historic District. The school moved to another home before a permanent building on Jackson Highway (now Hermitage Drive) was completed in 1917. At the time, the school had 400 students; the first senior class graduated in 1918 with 11 students. By the late 1940s, Florence's growth was fueled by the construction of Wilson Dam and the Tennessee Valley Authority's potassium nitrate plants, which had overcrowded Coffee. Classes were held in split sessions in the morning and afternoon.

A new campus was completed in 1951. After continued growth, a second-high school, Bradshaw High, was opened in 1966, for youth in the eastern parts of the city. But in the 1980s, due to economic decline in the area, the population of families with young people likewise fell, ending the need for two schools. As such, the Florence City Schools merged Coffee and Bradshaw in 2004 into Florence High School, which took up residence on the old Bradshaw campus.

== Original building ==
- Coffee High School
- U.S. National Register of Historic Places
- Location: 319 Hermitage Dr., Florence, Alabama
- Coordinates: 34°48′29″N 87°40′34″W
- Area: 2.7 acres (1.1 ha)
- Built: 1917
- Architect: Richard G. Deacon
- Demolished: 1980s
- NRHP reference No.: 82002045
- Added to NRHP: February 4, 1982

Coffee's original building was constructed on land donated to the city by Camilla M. Coffee. The building was near the campus of the State Normal School at Florence (today known as the University of North Alabama). The structure was two stories with a full basement. The main entrance opened into the auditorium, and behind it were three wings of classrooms with an open courtyard in the center. A flight of stairs led to the entry portico, with three arched openings supporting a limestone entablature. On the front-facing gable end was a boxed cornice with returns. The classroom wings featured pairs of twelve-over-twelve sash windows. Between every other pair of windows were full-height pilasters, with shallow shed awnings over each group.

After Coffee moved to a new building about 1/4 mile (400 m) away in 1951, the building was used for Appleby Junior High School. It was demolished in the 1980s after being heavily damaged by fire.

== Second building ==
Coffee's second building on Hermitage Drive was built in 1951 when the school outgrew its first building. It was built adjacent to Braly Municipal Stadium, which was constructed in the 1940s, and has served as the home of the North Alabama Lions football team; the Coffee, Bradshaw, and now Florence High School football teams; and hosted the NCAA Division II Football Championship final from 1986 until 2014. Since the merger with Bradshaw, the campus has been used for Florence Middle School and Freshman Center.

== Notable alumni ==
- Ronnie Flippo, former U.S. congressman
- Patterson Hood, musician

== See also ==
- Burrell Normal School (1903–1969), a private Black school in Florence, Alabama
