= Bradshaw High School =

- Florence, Alabama; United States

Information
- Type: Public high school
- Opened: 1966
- Closed: 2004
- Colors: Orange and Brown
- Mascot: Bruins

Bradshaw High School was a public high school in Florence, Alabama, United States. It was founded in 1966 as the second public high school in Florence because of continued growth for youth in the eastern parts of the city. In the 1980s, due to economic decline in the area, the population of families with young people likewise fell, ending the need for two schools. After the 2003–04 school year, the school merged with Coffee High School to form Florence High School, which took up residence on the old Bradshaw campus.

The school's colors were Orange and Brown and were selected based on the colors of the NFL's Cleveland Browns by the school's first cheerleaders and football players.

== History ==
Bradshaw High School opened its doors in August 1966. The school was named in honor of local attorney Mr. Henry A. Bradshaw who was an attorney for the Florence City Schools, as well as the Lauderdale County School System. The initial enrollment was 790 students, and within 10 years the enrollment grew to more than 1000 students. In its final year as Bradshaw, the high school had an enrollment of over 900 students.

== Athletics ==
During the 38 years of the school's operation, Bradshaw won several Alabama State Championships in a number of different sports.

== Notable alumni ==
- Brett Guthrie, U.S. Representative (KY 2009-Current)
- Pat Swoopes, NFL defensive tackle
- Gary Weaver, NFL linebacker
- Stewart Cink, PGA Golfer
