= Richie Gaskell =

American football player and coach

Biographical details
- Born: October 27, 1932 (age 94); Washington, D.C., U.S.

Playing career
- 1951–1954: George Washington
- Positions: End, halfback

Coaching career (HC unless noted)
- 1950s: Archbishop Carroll HS (DC) (assistant)
- 1958–1960: Columbia Prep (DC) (assistant)
- 1961: Wakefield HS (VA) (defense)
- 1962–1965: Furman (OL)
- 1966–1969: Carson–Newman
- 1972: Livingston (OC)
- 1973–1976: Florence State / North Alabama (OC)

Head coaching record
- Overall: 27–12–2

Accomplishments and honors

Awards
- 2× First-team All-Southern (1953, 1954)

Richie Gaskell (born October 27, 1932) is an American former football player and coach. He played college football at George Washington University in Washington, D.C. from 1951 to 1954. Gaskell was selected by the San Francisco 49ers in the 13th round of the 1955 NFL draft. He served as the head football coach at Carson–Newman University from 1966 to 1969, compiling a record of 27–12–2.

Gaskell was born on October 27, 1932, in Washington, D.C.
