= River Bell Classic =

American college football rivalry

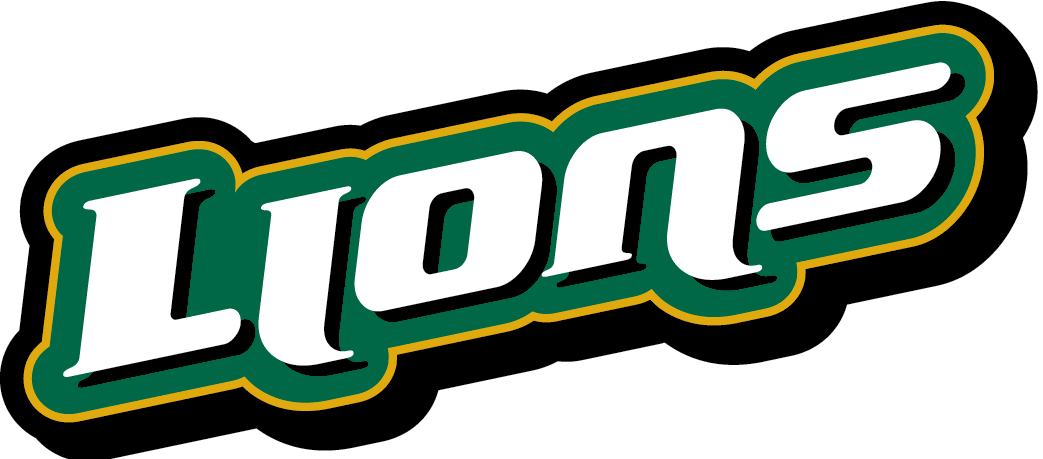
- Nicholls Colonels Southeastern Louisiana Lions
- Sport: Football
- First meeting: September 30, 1972; Southeastern Louisiana 31, Nicholls State 9
- Latest meeting: November 19, 2026; Southeastern Louisiana 38, Nicholls 10
- Next meeting: 2027
- Trophy: River Bell Trophy

Statistics
- Total meetings: 37
- All-time series: Southeastern Louisiana, 20–17
- Largest victory: Southeastern Louisiana, 62–3 (2014)
- Longest win streak: Nicholls State, 7 (1981–2006)
- Current win streak: Southeastern Louisiana, 3 (2024–present)

Locations of Nicholls and Southeastern Louisiana

The River Bell Classic is the annual football game between Nicholls State University and Southeastern Louisiana University with the winner being presented with the River Bell Trophy. The two schools are 94 miles apart. The game played between the rivals began in 1972 and was played annually until 1985 when Southeastern Louisiana dropped its football program. It resumed 20 years later in 2005 when football was reinstated by the university.

The River Bell Trophy, which was redesigned for the 2012 contest, is a wooden trophy which has a ship's bell under an arch which reads "River Bell Classic". On each side of the bell are the teams' athletic logos with Nicholls on the left and Southeastern Louisiana on the right. Underneath the bell is a plaque surrounded by the yearly victors on each side of the plaque. The trophy was conceived by the Phi Chapter Alumni Association of Sigma Tau Gamma fraternity at Southeastern Louisiana.

== Game results ==
Nicholls victories	Southeastern Louisiana victories

No.	Date	Location	Winner	Score
1	September 30, 1972	Hammond, LA	Southeastern Louisiana	31–9
2	September 29, 1973	Hammond, LA	Southeastern Louisiana	10–0
3	November 16, 1974	Thibodaux, LA	Nicholls State	10–0
4	November 15, 1975	New Orleans, LA	Nicholls State	14–6
5	November 13, 1976	New Orleans, LA	Southeastern Louisiana	17–7
6	November 12, 1977	Thibodaux, LA	Southeastern Louisiana	17–14
7	November 11, 1978	New Orleans, LA	Southeastern Louisiana	10–0
8	November 10, 1979	Hammond, LA	Southeastern Louisiana	38–0
9	November 15, 1980	Thibodaux, LA	Southeastern Louisiana	35–20
10	November 14, 1981	Hammond, LA	Nicholls State	29–17
11	November 20, 1982	Thibodaux, LA	Nicholls State	20–14
12	November 19, 1983	Hammond, LA	Nicholls State	6–0
13	November 17, 1984	Thibodaux, LA	Nicholls State	36–7
14	November 23, 1985	Hammond, LA	Nicholls State	21–17
15	November 12, 2005	Hammond, LA	Nicholls State	38–28
16	October 7, 2006	Thibodaux, LA	Nicholls State	14–10
17	November 17, 2007	Hammond, LA	Southeastern Louisiana	17–13
18	November 22, 2008	Thibodaux, LA	Nicholls State	35–28
19	November 19, 2009	Hammond, LA	Nicholls State	45–30

No.	Date	Location	Winner	Score
20	November 18, 2010	Thibodaux, LA	Nicholls State	27–25
21	November 17, 2011	Hammond, LA	Southeastern Louisiana	31–14
22	November 15, 2012	Thibodaux, LA	Southeastern Louisiana	35–16
23	November 21, 2013	Hammond, LA	Southeastern Louisiana	52–27
24	November 20, 2014	Thibodaux, LA	Southeastern Louisiana	62–3
25	November 19, 2015	Hammond, LA	Nicholls State	27–24
26	November 17, 2016	Thibodaux, LA	Southeastern Louisiana	44–42
27	November 16, 2017	Hammond, LA	Southeastern Louisiana	21–17
28	November 15, 2018	Thibodaux, LA	Nicholls	44–0
29	November 21, 2019	Hammond, LA	Nicholls	28–27
30	April 10, 2021	Thibodaux, LA	Southeastern Louisiana	52–45
31	October 9, 2021	Thibodaux, LA	Southeastern Louisiana	58–48
32	November 18, 2021	Hammond, LA	Nicholls	45–42
33	November 17, 2022	Thibodaux, LA	Southeastern Louisiana	40–17
34	November 16, 2023	Hammond, LA	Nicholls	21–16
35	November 21, 2024	Thibodaux, LA	Southeastern Louisiana	19–16
36	November 20, 2025	Hammond, LA	Southeastern Louisiana	38–26
37	November 19, 2026	Thibodaux, LA	Southeastern Louisiana	38–10
Series: Southeastern Louisiana leads 20–17

== See also ==
- List of NCAA college football rivalry games
