= 1970 Florence State Lions football team =

American college football season

1970 Florence State Lions football
- Conference: Mid-South Athletic Conference
- Record: 5–5 (1–4 MSAC)
- Head coach: Durell Mock (1st season)
- Home stadium: Braly Municipal Stadium

1970 Mid-South Athletic Conference football standings
	Conf.					Overall
Team	W		L		T	W		L		T
No. 2 Jacksonville State $	5	–	0	–	0	10	–	0	–	0
Tennessee–Martin	4	–	1	–	0	7	–	3	–	0
Troy State	3	–	2	–	0	6	–	4	–	1
Delta State	2	–	3	–	0	3	–	6	–	1
Florence State	1	–	4	–	0	5	–	5	–	0
Livingston	0	–	5	–	0	4	–	5	–	0
$ – Conference champion; Rankings from NAIA Division I poll

The 1970 Florence State Lions football team represented Florence State University—now known as the University of North Alabama—as a member of the Mid-South Athletic Conference (MSAC) during the 1970 NAIA Division I football season. Led by first-year head coach Durell Mock, the Lions compiled an overall record of 5–5 with a mark of 1–4 in conference play, placing fifth in the MSAC. Florence State played home game at Braly Municipal Stadium in Florence, Alabama.

== Schedule ==
Date	Time	Opponent	Site	Result	Attendance	Source
September 12	7:30 p.m.	at Northwestern State*	Demon Stadium; Natchitoches, LA	L 21–42		
September 19	7:30 p.m.	State College of Arkansas*	Braly Stadium; Florence, AL	W 28–17		
September 26	7:30 p.m.	at Delta State	Delta Field; Cleveland, MS	L 13–26		
October 3	2:00 p.m.	at Livingston	Tiger Stadium; Livingston, AL (Rivalry)	W 21–14		
October 10		at Arkansas Tech*	Buerkle Field; Russellville, AR	W 28–26		
October 17		Henderson State*	Braly Stadium; Florence, AL	W 30–20		
October 24	7:30 p.m.	Troy State	Braly Stadium; Florence, AL	L 23–28		
October 31	2:00 p.m.	Samford*^{†}	Braly Stadium; Florence, AL	W 24–10		
November 14	1:30 p.m.	Tennessee–Martin	Braly Stadium; Florence, AL	L 7–35		
November 21	1:30 p.m.	at No. 15 Jacksonville State	Paul Snow Memorial Stadium; Jacksonville, AL	L 28–55	13,000	
*Non-conference game; ^{†}Homecoming; Rankings from AP Poll released prior to the game; All times are in Central time

== Offseason ==
After the 1969 season, head coach Hal Self resigned from the position to take over the school's athletic director position full-time. Self had served as both head coach and athletic director in 1969 after the resignation of H.A. Flowers. Durell Mock, who had played under Self at Florence State from 1949 to 1952, was selected to become the second-ever head coach of the Lions.

In the summer before the 1970 season, Florence State would leave the Alabama Collegiate Conference with Jacksonville State, Troy State, and Livingston to become charter members of the new Mid-South Athletic Conference. This football-only conference would become the Gulf South Conference.

== Personnel ==
=== Roster ===
1970 Florence State Lions Football
Quarterbacks: Steve Coates - Freshman (5'11, 185); Allen Elkins - Sophomore (6'1, 195); David Elmore - Freshman (6'2, 175); Randy Elmore - Sophomore (6'1, 185); Halfbacks: Lee Long - Freshman (6'2, 190); Marvin Parks - Freshman (5'9, 190); Leonard Thomas - Junior (5'9, 195); Mike Wilburn - Freshman (5'8, 180); Fullbacks: Cary Alexander - Freshman (5'9, 175); Larry Brom - Freshman (5'11, 205); Stanley Graham - Freshman (6'1, 190); Carl McCulley - Senior (5'8, 185); Flanker backs: Danny Kimble - Freshman (5'10, 170); Bobby Joe Pride - Junior (5'9, 170); Jim Trimble - Sophomore (6'1, 165); Split ends: Bobby Burcham - Freshman (6'0, 168); Jody Gamble - Senior (6'0, 185); Tight ends: Jimmy Isbell - Junior (5'11, 185); Roger Mathis - Senior (6'2, 215); Dale Hancock - Senior (6'1, 225)	Defensive ends: Dale Burleson - Freshman (6'2, 190); Doyle Steele - Freshman (5'11, 190); Tommy Warhurst - Sophomore (6'0, 215); Centers: Bob Griffith - Freshman (6'1, 215); Gary Stapler - Junior (5'10, 205); Offensive guards: Gary Counts - Senior (6'1, 230); Bill Morton - Freshman (5'10, 215); Frankie Patterson - Sophomore (5'11, 210); Bill Strain - Freshman (6'2, 195); Defensive guards: Steve Borden - Freshman (5'10, 185); Wendell Hawthorne - Freshman (5'11, 215); Richard Jaggers - Freshman (6'2, 250); Ronnie McKinney - Junior (6'1, 195); Wayne Owens - Sophomore (6'0, 200)	Offensive tackles: Howard Byars - Senior (6'1, 230); Mike Naves - Freshman (6'2, 210); Bobby Thomas - Junior (6'0, 205); Defensive tackles: Bob Duvall - Freshman (6'5, 230); Ed Franks - Senior (5'9, 235); David Harbin - Freshman (5'11, 230); Dennis Buffaloe - Freshman (6'0, 190); Al Carter - Freshman (6'0, 220); Linebackers: William McCormack - Junior (6'2, 210); Hezzie Morgan - Freshman (6'1, 190); Leroy Baker - Sophomore (6'1, 210); Defensive halfbacks: Palmer Byrd - Junior (6'1, 180); Selma Hill - Freshman (5'9, 185); David Hines - Freshman (6'0, 165); Wayne Oldham - Freshman (5'10, 185); Ganum Smith - Senior (5'9, 175); Ronnie Williamson - Senior (5'11, 190); Stanley Steadman - Freshman (5'10, 165)

=== Coaching staff ===
Florence State Lions coaches

Head coach

- Durell Mock

Assistant coaches

- David Kirk - Defensive Secondary Coach
- Billy Hill - Quarterback Coach
- Henry Platter - End and Flanker Coach
- Larry Marshall - Interior Line Coach
- William Hamilton - Backfield Coach

== Statistics ==
=== Team ===
	Florence State	Opp
Scoring	223	273
First downs	153	193
Rushing	86	130
Passing	49	59
Penalty	18	4
Rushing yards	1825	2689
Avg per game	182.5	268.9
Rushing touchdowns	22	28
Passing yards	1337	1193
Att-Comp-Int	212-95-21	201-91-21
Avg per game	133.7	119.3
Passing touchdowns	23	24
Total offense	3162	3882
Avg per game	316.2	388.2
Fumbles-Lost	28-15	20-11
Penalties-Yards	40-390	45-504

	Florence State	Opp
Punt-Yards	51-2045	37-1450
Avg per punt	40.0	39.2
Punt Return-Yards	11-157	32-352
Avg per punt return	14.7	11.0
Kickoff Return-Yards	42-986	34-745
Avg per kickoff return	23.5	21.9
Interceptions-Yards	21-189	21-147
Avg per play	9.0	7.0
Touchdowns scored	31	37
Field goals-Attempts	2-5	5-10
PAT-Attempts	29-31	28-32

=== Individual leaders ===
==== Offense ====
Passing statistics
NAME	POS	CMP	ATT	YDS	CMP%	TD	INT
Randy Elmore	QB	91	205	1318	44.3	8	21
David Elmore	QB	4	6	19	66.6	0	0
Allen Elkins	QB	0	1	0	0	0	0
TOTALS		95	212	1337	44.8%	8	21

Rushing statistics
NAME	POS	ATT	GAIN	AVG	TD
Carl McCulley	FB	140	591 yrds	4.2	7 TDs
Leonard Thomas	HB	87	499 yrds	5.7	6 TDs
Randy Elmore	QB	128	438 yrds	3.4	6 TDs
Bobby Joe Pride	FL	38	177 yrds	4.6	3 TDs
Larry Brom	FB	23	70 yrds	3.4	1 TD
Mike Wilburn	HB	13	38 yrds	2.9	0 TDs
Allen Elkins	QB	1	1 yrd	1.0	0 TDs
David Elmore	QB	2	7 yrds	3.5	0 TDs
TOTALS		432	1821 yrds	4.2	23 TDs

Receiving statistics
NAME	POS	CTH	YDS	TD
Danny Kimble	FL	25	470 yrds	3 TDs
Leonard Thomas	HB	23	267 yrds	4 TDs
Bobby Joe Pride	FL	16	254 yrds	0 TDs
Jim Trimble	FL	9	102 yrds	1 TD
Jody Gamble	SE	7	84 yrds	0 TDs
Dale Hancock	TE	5	62 yrds	0 TDs
Carl McCulley	FB	4	60 yrds	0 TDs
Mike Wilburn	HB	1	19 yrds	0 TDs
Larry Brom	FB	4	11 yrds	0 TDs
Jimmy Isbell	TE	1	8 yrds	0 TDs
TOTALS		95	1337 yrds	8 TDs

==== Defense ====
Defense statistics
NAME	POS	INT
Palmer Byrd	DHB	6
Ronnie Williamson	DHB	5
William McCormack	LB	3
Ganum Smith	DHB	2
Leroy Baker	LB	2
Tommy Warhurst	DE	1
Others		2
TOTAL		21

==== Special teams ====
Punting statistics
NAME	POS	PUNTS	YDS	AVG
Jody Gamble	SE	51	2045 yrds	40.0
TOTALS		51	2045 yrds	40.0

Kick return statistics
NAME	POS	RTNS	YDS	AVG	TD
Bobby Joe Pride	FL	18	623	34.5	1
Leonard Thomas	HB	11	214	19.4	0
Jimmy Isbell	TE	3	34	11.3	0
Larry Brom	FB	3	34	11.3	0
Ganum Smith	DHB	1	21	21.0	0
Allen Elkins	QB	2	22	10.4	0
Bobby Burcham	SE	2	19	9.5	0
Ronnie Williamson	DHB	1	16	16.0	0
Danny Kimble	FL	1	5	5.0	0
TOTALS		42	988 yrds	23.5	1 TD

Punt return statistics
NAME	POS	RTNS	YDS	AVG	TD
Leonard Thomas	HB	6	105	17.5	0
Bobby Joe Pride	FL	5	52	10.4	0
TOTALS		11	157 yrds	14.3	0 TD's
