= 1970 Troy State Red Wave football team =

American college football season

1970 Troy State Red Wave football
- Conference: Mid-South Athletic Conference
- Record: 6–4–1 (3–2 MSAC)
- Head coach: Billy Atkins (5th season)
- Home stadium: Veterans Memorial Stadium

1970 Mid-South Athletic Conference football standings
| | Conf. | | | | | Overall |
| Team | W | | L | | T | W | | L | | T |
|---|---|---|---|---|---|---|---|---|---|---|
| No. 2 Jacksonville State $ | 5 | – | 0 | – | 0 | 10 | – | 0 | – | 0 |
| Tennessee–Martin | 4 | – | 1 | – | 0 | 7 | – | 3 | – | 0 |
| Troy State | 3 | – | 2 | – | 0 | 6 | – | 4 | – | 1 |
| Delta State | 2 | – | 3 | – | 0 | 3 | – | 6 | – | 1 |
| Florence State | 1 | – | 4 | – | 0 | 5 | – | 5 | – | 0 |
| Livingston | 0 | – | 5 | – | 0 | 4 | – | 5 | – | 0 |
$ – Conference champion; Rankings from NAIA Division I poll

The 1970 Troy State Red Wave football team represented Troy State University (now known as Troy University) as a member of the Mid-South Athletic Conference (MSAC) during the 1970 NAIA Division I football season. Led by fifth-year head coach Billy Atkins, the Red Wave compiled an overall record of 6–4–1 with a mark of 3–2 in conference play, placing third in the MSAC.

== Schedule ==
| Date | Opponent | Rank | Site | Result | Attendance | Source |
|---|---|---|---|---|---|---|
| September 12 | Sam Houston State* | | Rip Hewes Stadium; Dothan, AL | T 20–20 | 9,000 | |
| September 19 | Austin Peay* | | Veterans Memorial Stadium; Troy, AL | W 28–0 | 5,500 | |
| September 26 | vs. Livingston | | Cramton Bowl; Montgomery, AL | W 42–7 | 6,000 | |
| October 3 | at Southeastern Louisiana* | | Strawberry Stadium; Hammond, LA | W 21–12 | | |
| October 10 | Delta State* | No. 17 | Veterans Memorial Stadium; Troy, AL | W 42–6 | | |
| October 17 | at Jacksonville State | No. 15 | Paul Snow Stadium; Jacksonville, AL (rivalry) | L 10–55 | | |
| October 24 | at Florence State | | Braly Municipal Stadium; Florence, AL | W 28–23 | | |
| October 31 | McNeese State* | | Veterans Memorial Stadium; Troy, AL | L 7–38 | 10,000 | |
| November 7 | at Tennessee–Martin | | Pacer Stadium; Martin, TN | L 9–23 | 7,950 | |
| November 14 | at Northeast Louisiana* | | Brown Stadium; Monroe, LA | L 10–14 | 3,000 | |
| November 21 | Appalachian State* | | Veterans Memorial Stadium; Troy, AL | W 42–0 | | |
*Non-conference game; Rankings from AP Poll released prior to the game
