= 1971 Livingston Tigers football team =

American college football season

1971 Livingston Tigers football

NAIA Division I national champion GSC co-champion

Champion Bowl, W 14–12 vs. Arkansas Tech
- Conference: Gulf South Conference
- Record: 11–1 (5–1 GSC)
- Head coach: Mickey Andrews (2nd season)
- Home stadium: Tiger Stadium

1971 Gulf South Conference football standings
	Conf.					Overall
Team	W		L		T	W		L		T
No. 1 Livingston +^	5	–	1	–	0	11	–	1	–	0
Troy State +	5	–	1	–	0	6	–	3	–	0
Jacksonville State	3	–	2	–	0	6	–	3	–	0
Tennessee–Martin	3	–	3	–	0	5	–	5	–	0
Delta State	2	–	4	–	0	3	–	5	–	1
Florence State	0	–	6	–	0	1	–	10	–	0
Southeastern Louisiana	0	–	6	–	0	0	–	11	–	0
+ – Conference co-champions; ^ – NAIA Division I playoff participant; Rankings from NAIA Division I poll

The 1971 Livingston Tigers football team was an American football team that represented Livingston University (later renamed the University of West Alabama) in the Gulf South Conference (GSC) during the 1971 NAIA Division I football season. In their second season under head coach Mickey Andrews, the Tigers compiled an 11–1 record (5–1 against conference opponents) and shared the GSC championship with Troy State. The Tigers advanced to the NAIA playoffs, defeating West Liberty State (25–2) in the semifinal and Arkansas Tech (14–12) in the Champion Bowl to win the NAIA Division I national football championship.

At the end of the season, Andrews was named GSC Coach of the Year, and quarterback Clemit Spruiell was named GSC Offensive Player of the Year. Four Livingston players were named to the All-GSC team: Spruiell; linebacker Nels Strickland; defensive tackle Herbie Malone; and defensive end Adrian Gant.

== Schedule ==
Date	Opponent	Site	Result	Attendance	Source
September 11	vs. Jacksonville State	Anniston Memorial Stadium; Anniston, AL	W 10–9	> 10,000	
September 18	at Southern State Arkansas*	Magnolia, AR	W 7–0		
September 25	vs. Troy State	Cramton Bowl; Montgomery, AL	L 21–30	8,500	
October 9	at Samford*	Seibert Stadium; Homewood, AL	W 28–3		
October 16	vs. Quantico Marines*	Memorial Stadium; Selma, AL	W 17–13		
October 23	Western Carolina*	Tiger Stadium; Livingston, AL	W 15–9		
October 30	at Florence State	Braly Municipal Stadium; Florence, AL (rivalry)	W 31–0		
November 6	Delta State^{†}	Tiger Stadium; Livingston, AL	W 45–21		
November 13	at Mississippi College*	Robinson Field; Clinton, MS	W 20–3		
November 20	Tennessee–Martin	Tiger Stadium; Livingston, AL	W 28–7		
November 27	vs. West Liberty State*	Steubenville, OH (NAIA Division I semifinal)	W 25–2		
December 11	vs. Arkansas Tech*	Legion Field; Birmingham, AL (Champion Bowl)	W 14–12	3,219	
*Non-conference game; ^{†}Homecoming
