= Scott Cochran =

American football coach (born 1979)

Current position
- Title: Head coach
- Team: West Alabama
- Conference: GSC
- Record: 5–4

Biographical details
- Born: March 21, 1979 (age 47); New Orleans, Louisiana, U.S.
- Education: Louisiana State University

Coaching career (HC unless noted)
- 1998–2001: LSU Laboratory School (AS&C)
- 2001–2003: LSU (GA)
- 2003–2004: LSU (AS&C)
- 2004–2006: New Orleans Hornets (AS&C)
- 2007–2019: Alabama (S&C)
- 2020–2023: Georgia (STC)
- 2025–present: West Alabama

Head coaching record
- Overall: 5–4

Accomplishments and honors

Awards
- 2x Samson Strength & Conditioning Coach of the Year (2008, 2011)

Scott Cochran (born March 21, 1979) is an American college football coach who is currently the head football coach at West Alabama. Cochran previously served as the strength and conditioning coach for the Alabama Crimson Tide from 2007 until 2019, and later served as the strength and conditioning coach and special teams coordinator for the Georgia Bulldogs from 2020 to 2023. He has won eight national championships throughout his coaching career.

== Coaching career ==
=== Louisiana State University ===
Cochran began his coaching career at the Louisiana State University Laboratory School, where he served as assistant strength and conditioning coach from 1998 to 2001. Cochran became a graduate assistant at his alma mater, Louisiana State University, that same year. In 2003, he was named an assistant strength and conditioning coach and won his first national championship under Nick Saban.

=== New Orleans Hornets ===
In 2004, Cochran was hired as an assistant strength and conditioning coach for the New Orleans Hornets and remained there until the end of the 2006–07 season.

=== University of Alabama ===
In 2007, Cochran reunited with Saban and became a part of his inaugural Alabama staff as the team's head strength and conditioning coach. He won an additional five national championships, as well as the Samson Strength & Conditioning Coach of the Year Award, and remained with the team until the end of the 2019 season after growing tension with coach Saban.

=== University of Georgia ===
In 2020, Cochran joined the Georgia Bulldogs' coaching staff as the special teams coordinator under head coach Kirby Smart. Cochran was part of the Georgia staff that won the 2022 National Championship over Alabama. He won his second title with Georgia when they defeated TCU in the 2023 National Championship.

On February 14, 2024, Cochran resigned from the Georgia coaching staff, succeeded by Kirk Benedict.

=== University of West Alabama ===
On February 3, 2025, Cochran was announced as the new head football coach at West Alabama. West Alabama started his first season off 5–0 before falling to a West Florida team that moved to 7–0 with their victory. West Alabama proceeded to lose their remaining 4 games, to finish 5–4.

=== Book ===
On August 19, 2025, Hachette's Center Street imprint published Cochran's sports memoir and leadership book, Skull Session: Mastering the Mental Game in Sports, Work, and Life.

== Personal life ==
Cochran and his wife, Cissy, have three children.

== Head coaching record ==
| Year | Team | Overall | Conference | Standing | Bowl/playoffs |
|---|---|---|---|---|---|
West Alabama Tigers (Gulf South Conference) (2025–present)
| 2025 | West Alabama | 5–4 | 0–3 | 4th | |
| West Alabama: | | 5–4 | 0–3 | | |
| Total: | | 5–4 | | | |
