= 1971 Florence State Lions football team =

American college football season

1971 Florence State Lions football
- Conference: Gulf South Conference
- Record: 1–10 (0–6 GSC)
- Head coach: Durell Mock (2nd season)
- Captains: Palmer Byrd; Leonard Thomas
- Home stadium: Braly Municipal Stadium

1971 Gulf South Conference football standings
	Conf.					Overall
Team	W		L		T	W		L		T
No. 1 Livingston +^	5	–	1	–	0	11	–	1	–	0
Troy State +	5	–	1	–	0	6	–	3	–	0
Jacksonville State	3	–	2	–	0	6	–	3	–	0
Tennessee–Martin	3	–	3	–	0	5	–	5	–	0
Delta State	2	–	4	–	0	3	–	5	–	1
Florence State	0	–	6	–	0	1	–	10	–	0
Southeastern Louisiana	0	–	6	–	0	0	–	11	–	0
+ – Conference co-champions; ^ – NAIA Division I playoff participant; Rankings from NAIA Division I poll

The 1971 Florence State Lions football team represented Florence State University as a member of the Gulf South Conference (GSC) during the 1971 NAIA Division I football season. Led by returning head coach Durell Mock, the Lions compiled an overall record of 1–10 with a mark of 0–6 in conference play, tying for sixth place in the GSC. Florence State played home game at Braly Municipal Stadium in Florence, Alabama.

== Schedule ==
The 1971 schedule for the Lions featured two neutral site games. On October 2, the Lions would face off against the Samford Bulldogs in Russellville, AL at the local stadium. It is reported to be the first ever college football game to ever take place in the town. Florence State would also play its yearly game against Jacksonville State on November 20 at Legion Field in Birmingham. In an effort sponsored by the Kiwanis Club of Birmingham, the two teams would take the field the week before the Iron Bowl, which was played at same stadium.

Date	Time	Opponent	Site	Result	Attendance	Source
September 11	7:30 p.m.	Middle Tennessee*	Braly Municipal Stadium; Florence, AL	W 24–14	6,000–7,000	
September 18	7:30 p.m.	at State College of Arkansas*	Estes Stadium; Conway, AR	L 13–14	1,500	
September 25	7:30 p.m.	Delta State	Braly Municipal Stadium; Florence, AL	L 10–17	7,500	
October 2	7:30 p.m.	vs. Samford*	Russellville Stadium; Russellville, AL	L 10–17	8,000	
October 9	2:00 p.m.	Arkansas Tech*^{†}	Braly Municipal Stadium; Florence, AL	L 30–31	7,000	
October 16	7:30 p.m.	at Henderson State*	Haygood Stadium; Arkadelphia, AR	L 7–21	1,500	
October 23	2:00 p.m.	at Troy State	Memorial Stadium; Troy, AL	L 14–21	6,500–7,000	
October 30	7:30 p.m.	Livingston	Braly Municipal Stadium; Florence, AL (rivalry)	L 0-31	7,000	
November 6	1:30 p.m.	at Appalachian State*	Conrad Stadium; Boone, NC	L 6–59	6,000	
November 13	2:00 p.m.	at Tennessee–Martin	College Stadium; Martin, TN	L 7–20	6,000	
November 20	8:00 p.m.	vs. Jacksonville State	Legion Field; Birmingham, AL	L 7–60	12,000	
*Non-conference game; ^{†}Homecoming

== Offseason ==
=== Background ===
The offseason before the 1971 season was highlighted by conference realignment. On June 28, the members of the existing Mid-South Athletic Conference and two members of the collapsed Gulf States Conference agreed to form a new conference: the Gulf South Conference. This would have minimal impact on Florence State's football schedule as only Southeastern Louisiana joined the Gulf South Conference as a full member including football for the 1971 season.

The offseason was also marred by tragedy. On April 8, the 17-month old son of Lions star tailback Leonard "Rabbit" Thomas died in a house fire. Practices following the incident were cancelled and head coach Durell Mock was seen helping the clean up the damaged home the day following the fire. The Student Government Association also set up a clothes and furniture drive for the family. Thomas would still go on to play in the 1971 season.

=== Signees ===
Name	Pos.	High school
John Andrews	C	Columbia Military Academy
Henry Cooper	TB	Columbia Military Academy
Roger Ferrell	QB	Decatur High School
Clinton League	LB	Haleyville High School
Billy Legg	TB	Athens High School
William Miles	QB	Columbia Military Academy
Paul Parvin	C	Lee High School
Wilmer Ray	TB	Cherokee High School

== Personnel ==
=== Roster ===
1971 Florence State Lions Football
Quarterbacks: Randy Elmore - Junior (6'1, 185); David Elmore - Freshman (6'1, 185); Billy Miles - Freshman (6'2, 180); Roger Ferrell - Freshman (6'2, 195); Tailbacks: Leonard Thomas - Senior (5'9, 190); Bobby Joe Pride - Senior (5'8, 170); Randy Legg - Freshman (5'10, 170); Fullbacks: Mike Wilburn - Sophomore (5'8, 187); Larry Brom - Sophomore (5'11, 195); Carl Ray - Freshman (5'10, 185); Flankers: Jim Trimble - Junior (6'0, 175); Henry Cooper - Freshman (5'9, 175); Kickers: Conor McGregory Freshman (5'10, 175)	Ends: Danny Kimble - Sophomore (5'10, 176); Bob Duvall - Sophomore (6'5, 230); Bobby Burcham - Sophomore (6'0, 175); George Tate - Freshman (6'1, 184); Tackles: Wayne Owens - Junior (6'0, 205); Frankie Patterson - Junior (5'10, 215); Tommy Warhurst - Junior (6'0, 215); David Harbin - Freshman (6'0, 245); Mike Nave - Freshman (6'1, 225); David Corl - Freshman (5'10, 220); Dennis Buffaloe - Freshman (6'1, 208); Eddie Hill - Freshman (6'2, 220); Guards: Bill Morton - Sophomore (5'10, 220); Wendell Hathorn - Sophomore (5'11, 225); Richard Jaggers - Sophomore (6'2, 250); Hezzie Morgan - Sophomore (6'0, 194); Steve Borden - Freshman (5'11, 185); Tommy Howell - Freshman (6'0, 220); John Trotter - Freshman (5'10, 210); Randall Marshall - Freshman (6'2, 192)	Centers: Bill Strain - Freshman (6'2, 220); Paul Parvin - Freshman (6'1, 230); Johnny Andrews - Freshman (6'1, 230); Guy Fry - Freshman (6'2, 190); Linebackers: Leroy Baker - Junior (6'1, 220); William McCormmack - Junior (6'2, 210); Marvin Parks - Sophomore (5'9, 202); Van Barnes - Sophomore (5'8, 195); Bill Hargrove - Freshman (5'11, 185); David Gargis - Freshman (6'2, 185); Clinton League - Freshman (6'2, 190); Doyce Steele - Freshman (6'1, 188); Defensive backs: Palmer Byrd - Senior (6'0, 185); Jim Witt - Freshman (5'11, 160); David Hines - Freshman (5'11, 185); Wayne Oldham - Freshman (5'11, 185); Larry Jefferys - Freshman (5'10, 175); Johnny Montgomery - Freshman (5'8, 160); Randy Johnson - Freshman (5'10, 165); Wayne Bailey - Freshman (6'0, 175); Steve Harrison - Freshman (6'1, 165); Mike Predmore - Freshman (5'9, 165)

=== Coaching staff ===
Florence State Lions coaches

Head coach

- Durell Mock

Assistant coaches

- Henry Pratter - Receiver Coach
- Larry Marshall - Interior Line Coach
- William Hamilton - Backfield Coach
- Jerry Elmore - Backfield Coach
- Gunam Smith - Defensive Backs Coach
- Dan Daughtery - Defensive Line Coach
- Carl McCulley - Backfield Coach
- Bill Pike - Head Trainer
- Johnny Long - Assistant Trainer
