= Mickey Andrews =

American football player and coach (born 1942)

Biographical details
- Born: May 20, 1942 (age 84); Daleville, Alabama, U.S.

Playing career
- 1961–1964: Alabama
- Positions: Wide receiver, defensive back

Coaching career (HC unless noted)
- 1965–1966: Erwin HS (AL)
- 1966–1967: Eastern Kentucky (off. backs)
- 1967–1969: Livingston (assistant)
- 1970–1972: Livingston
- 1973–1976: Florence State / North Alabama
- 1977–1980: Clemson (DC)
- 1981–1982: Florida (assistant)
- 1983: Arizona Wranglers (DC)
- 1984–2001: Florida State (DC)
- 2002–2009: Florida State (assoc. HC / DC)
- 2018: Florida State (special assistant)

Head coaching record
- Overall: 41–28–3 (college)
- Tournaments: 2–1 (NAIA D-I playoffs)

Accomplishments and honors

Championships
- NAIA Division I (1971); GSC (1971)

Awards
- Broyles Award (1996); GSC Coach of The Year (1971); Second-team All-American (1964)

Mickey Andrews (born May 20, 1942) is an American former football coach. He is most known for his tenure as the defensive coordinator at Florida State for 26 seasons, from 1984 to 2009, under head coach Bobby Bowden. Andrews also served as the head football coach at Livingston University—now known as the University of West Alabama from 1970 to 1972 and at the University of North Alabama from 1973 to 1976.

== College ==
At the University of Alabama, Andrews earned second-team All-America honors as a wide receiver and defensive back. Andrews was also on two Alabama national championship teams (1961 and 1964) and played in three New Year's Day bowl games.

In college baseball, Andrews was an All-SEC choice. In 1964, he received the Hugo Friedman Award as Alabama's best all-around athlete.

== Career ==
Under Andrews, Florida State became the top producer of All-America and National Football League caliber cornerbacks in the nation. Andrews coached two Jim Thorpe Award winners and had an All-American cornerback for eight straight years, from 1987 to 1994. He had one consensus All-America selection in 2000. Seven of Andrews' defensive teams were among the top five nationally against the run since 1994. His 1998 defensive unit ranked No. 1 nationally in total defense and pass defense. On November 3, 2009, Andrews announced that he would retire as defensive coordinator after 26 seasons at Florida State. Andrews retired, along with Bobby Bowden, at the end of the 2009 season and coached his final game in Florida State's victory over West Virginia on January 1, 2010, in the Gator Bowl. He stayed on the university payroll until February 10, 2010, the anniversary date of his hiring by Bowden. On August 3, 2018, he was hired as special assistant to Willie Taggart, the head football coach at Florida State University.

== Personal ==
Andrews was married to Diane, who died in 2012 of complications from stomach cancer. The couple had two children: Ronald David (Ronnie), who died in 2007, father of three children, and Shannon Nicole (now Stallworth) who has two children. Andrews still lives in Tallahassee.

== Accolades ==
- 1971 NAIA National Championship at University of West Alabama
- 1994 University of West Alabama Hall of Fame
- 1996 Athlon Magazine's Assistant Coach of the Year
- 1996 Broyles Award as the nation's top assistant coach
- 1998 American Football Coach's Magazine's Defensive Coordinator of the Year

== Head coaching record ==
=== College ===
Year	Team	Overall	Conference	Standing	Bowl/playoffs
Livingston Tigers (Mid-South Athletic Conference / Gulf South Conference) (1970–1972)
1970	Livingston	4–5	0–5	6th	
1971	Livingston	11–1	5–1	T–1st	W NAIA Division I Championship
1972	Livingston	8–1–2	5–1	2nd	L NAIA Division I Semifinal
Livingston:		23–7–2	10–7		
Florence State / North Alabama Lions (Gulf South Conference) (1973–1976)
1973	Florence State	4–6	3–6	9th	
1974	North Alabama	4–6	4–4	T–5th	
1975	North Alabama	6–4	4–4	6th	
1976	North Alabama	4–5–1	3–4–1	6th	
Florence State / North Alabama:		18–21–1	14–18–1		
Total:		41–28–3			
National championship Conference title Conference division title or championship game berth
