= 1970 Jacksonville State Gamecocks football team =

American college football season

1970 Jacksonville State Gamecocks football

MSAC champion

Orange Blossom Classic, W 21–7 vs. Florida A&M
- Conference: Mid-South Athletic Conference
- Record: 10–0 (5–0 MSAC)
- Head coach: Charley Pell (2nd season)
- Home stadium: Paul Snow Stadium

1970 Mid-South Athletic Conference football standings
	Conf.					Overall
Team	W		L		T	W		L		T
No. 2 Jacksonville State $	5	–	0	–	0	10	–	0	–	0
Tennessee–Martin	4	–	1	–	0	7	–	3	–	0
Troy State	3	–	2	–	0	6	–	4	–	1
Delta State	2	–	3	–	0	3	–	6	–	1
Florence State	1	–	4	–	0	5	–	5	–	0
Livingston	0	–	5	–	0	4	–	5	–	0
$ – Conference champion; Rankings from NAIA Division I poll

The 1970 Jacksonville State Gamecocks football team represented Jacksonville State University as a member of the Mid-South Athletic Conference (MSAC) during the 1970 NAIA Division I football season. Led by second-year head coach Charley Pell, the Gamecocks compiled an overall record of 10–0 with a mark of 5–0 in conference play, and finished as MSAC champion.

== Schedule ==
Date	Opponent	Rank	Site	Result	Attendance	Source
September 19	at Samford*		Seibert Stadium; Homewood, AL (rivalry)	W 34–9		
October 3	at Western Carolina*		Memorial Stadium; Cullowhee, NC	W 24–10		
October 10	at Tennessee–Martin		Pacer Stadium; Martin, TN	W 16–14		
October 17	No. 15 Troy State		Paul Snow Stadium; Jacksonville, AL (rivalry)	W 55–10		
October 31	Northwestern State*		Paul Snow Stadium; Jacksonville, AL	W 35–6		
November 7	at Delta State	No. 18	Delta Field; Cleveland, MS	W 37–7		
November 14	Livingston	No. 16	Paul Snow Stadium; Jacksonville, AL	W 8–7		
November 21	Florence State^{†}	No. 15	Paul Snow Stadium; Jacksonville, AL	W 55–28	13,000	
November 26	at Chattanooga*	No. 8	Chamberlain Field; Chattanooga, TN	W 40–6		
December 12	vs. Florida A&M*	No. 8	Miami Orange Bowl; Miami, FL (Orange Blossom Classic)	W 21–7	31,184	
*Non-conference game; ^{†}Homecoming; Rankings from AP Poll released prior to the game
