= 1971 Jacksonville State Gamecocks football team =

American college football season

1971 Jacksonville State Gamecocks football
- Conference: Gulf South Conference
- Record: 6–3 (3–2 GSC)
- Head coach: Charley Pell (3rd season)
- Offensive coordinator: Clarkie Mayfield (3rd season)
- Home stadium: Paul Snow Stadium

1971 Gulf South Conference football standings
	Conf.					Overall
Team	W		L		T	W		L		T
No. 1 Livingston +^	5	–	1	–	0	11	–	1	–	0
Troy State +	5	–	1	–	0	6	–	3	–	0
Jacksonville State	3	–	2	–	0	6	–	3	–	0
Tennessee–Martin	3	–	3	–	0	5	–	5	–	0
Delta State	2	–	4	–	0	3	–	5	–	1
Florence State	0	–	6	–	0	1	–	10	–	0
Southeastern Louisiana	0	–	6	–	0	0	–	11	–	0
+ – Conference co-champions; ^ – NAIA Division I playoff participant; Rankings from NAIA Division I poll

The 1971 Jacksonville State Gamecocks football team represented Jacksonville State University as a member of the Gulf South Conference (GSC) during the 1971 NAIA Division I football season. Led by third-year head coach Charley Pell, the Gamecocks compiled an overall record of 6–3 with a mark of 3–2 in conference play, and finished third in the GSC.

== Schedule ==
Date	Opponent	Site	Result	Attendance	Source
September 11	vs. Livingston	Memorial Stadium; Anniston, AL	L 9–10	>10,000	
September 25	Southeast Missouri State*	Paul Snow Stadium; Jacksonville, AL	W 57–0		
October 2	Western Carolina*	Paul Snow Stadium; Jacksonville, AL	W 41–14		
October 9	at Southeastern Louisiana	Strawberry Stadium; Hammond, LA	W 20–14	7,200	
October 16	at Troy State	Veterans Memorial Stadium; Troy, AL (rivalry)	L 28–42	8,000–9,000	
October 23	Samford*	Paul Snow Stadium; Jacksonville, AL (rivalry)	L 21–31	6,200	
October 30	Tennessee–Martin	Paul Snow Stadium; Jacksonville, AL	W 30–10		
November 13	Delta State	Paul Snow Stadium; Jacksonville, AL	W 31–14	5,238	
November 19	vs. Florence State	Legion Field; Birmingham, AL	W 60–7	12,000	
*Non-conference game
