= Durell Mock =

American football player and coach (1929–1999)

Biographical details
- Born: November 10, 1929
- Died: March 2, 1999 (aged 69); Florence, Alabama, U.S.

Playing career
- 1949–1952: Florence State
- Position: Offensive lineman

Coaching career (HC unless noted)
- 1956–1958: Marion County HS (AL)
- 1960–1966: Muscle Shoals HS (AL)
- 1970–1972: Florence State

Head coaching record
- Overall: 8–24 (college); 32–48–6 (high school)

Lotice Durrell Mock (November 10, 1929 – March 2, 1999) was an American football player and coach. He served as the head football coach at the Florence State University—now known as the University of North Alabama—from 1970 to 1972, compiling a record of 8–24. Prior to that, he was a high school football coach in the state of Alabama.

After retiring from coaching, he served as the Chief of Police at North Alabama's campus.

== Head coaching record ==
=== College ===
Year	Team	Overall	Conference	Standing	Bowl/playoffs
Florence State Lions (Mid-South Athletic Conference / Gulf South Conference) (1970–1972)
1970	Florence State	5–5	1–4	5th	
1971	Florence State	1–10	0–6	T–6th	
1972	Florence State	2–9	1–5	T–7th	
North Alabama:		8–24	2–15		
Total:		8–24			
