= 1971 Troy State Red Wave football team =

American college football season

1971 Troy State Red Wave football

GSC co-champion
- Conference: Gulf South Conference
- Record: 6–3 (5–1 GSC)
- Head coach: Billy Atkins (6th season)
- Home stadium: Veterans Memorial Stadium

1971 Gulf South Conference football standings
	Conf.					Overall
Team	W		L		T	W		L		T
No. 1 Livingston +^	5	–	1	–	0	11	–	1	–	0
Troy State +	5	–	1	–	0	6	–	3	–	0
Jacksonville State	3	–	2	–	0	6	–	3	–	0
Tennessee–Martin	3	–	3	–	0	5	–	5	–	0
Delta State	2	–	4	–	0	3	–	5	–	1
Florence State	0	–	6	–	0	1	–	10	–	0
Southeastern Louisiana	0	–	6	–	0	0	–	11	–	0
+ – Conference co-champions; ^ – NAIA Division I playoff participant; Rankings from NAIA Division I poll

The 1971 Troy State Red Wave football team represented Troy State University (now known as Troy University) as a member of the Gulf South Conference (GSC) during the 1971 NAIA Division I football season. Led by sixth-year head coach Billy Atkins, the Red Wave compiled an overall record of 6–3 with a mark of 5–1 in conference play, sharing the GSC title with Livingston.

== Schedule ==
Date	Opponent	Site	Result	Attendance	Source
September 18	at Austin Peay*	Municipal Stadium; Clarksville, TN	L 0–34	4,617–5,385	
September 25	vs. Livingston	Cramton Bowl; Montgomery, AL	W 21–20	8,500	
October 2	Southeastern Louisiana	Veterans Memorial Stadium; Troy, AL	W 31–6	5,500	
October 9	at Delta State	Delta Field; Cleveland, MS	L 14–20	5,000	
October 16	Jacksonville State	Veterans Memorial Stadium; Troy, AL (rivalry)	W 42–28	8,000–9,000	
October 23	Florence State	Veterans Memorial Stadium; Troy, AL	W 21–14	7,000	
October 30	at No. 2 McNeese State*	Cowboy Stadium; Lake Charles, LA	L 7–17	14,300	
November 6	Tennessee–Martin	Veterans Memorial Stadium; Troy, AL	W 21–0	3,000	
November 13	Northeast Louisiana*	Rip Hewes Stadium; Dothan, AL	W 21–7	5,500	
*Non-conference game; Rankings from AP Poll released prior to the game
