= 2022 TCU Horned Frogs football team =

American college football season

2022 TCU Horned Frogs football

Fiesta Bowl champion

Big 12 Championship, L 28–31 ^{OT} vs. Kansas State

Fiesta Bowl (CFP Semifinal), W 51–45 vs. Michigan CFP National Championship, L 7–65 vs. Georgia
- Conference: Big 12 Conference

Ranking
- Coaches: No. 2
- AP: No. 2
- Record: 13–2 (9–0 Big 12)
- Head coach: Sonny Dykes (1st season)
- Offensive coordinator: Garrett Riley (1st season)
- Co-offensive coordinator: A. J. Ricker (1st season)
- Offensive scheme: Bear raid
- Defensive coordinator: Joe Gillespie (1st season)
- Base defense: 3–3–5
- Home stadium: Amon G. Carter Stadium

2022 Big 12 Conference football standings
	Conf.			Overall
Team	W		L	W		L
No. 2 TCU y^	9	–	0	13	–	2
No. 14 Kansas State y$	7	–	2	10	–	4
No. 25 Texas	6	–	3	8	–	5
Texas Tech	5	–	4	8	–	5
Oklahoma State	4	–	5	7	–	6
Baylor	4	–	5	6	–	7
Oklahoma	3	–	6	6	–	7
Kansas	3	–	6	6	–	7
West Virginia	3	–	6	5	–	7
Iowa State	1	–	8	4	–	8
Championship: Kansas State 31, TCU 28 ^{OT}
^ – College Football Playoff participant; $ – Conference champion; y – Championship game participant; Rankings from AP Poll

The 2022 TCU Horned Frogs football team represented Texas Christian University in the 2022 NCAA Division I FBS football season. The Horned Frogs played their home games at Amon G. Carter Stadium in Fort Worth, Texas, and competed in the Big 12 Conference. They were led by first-year head coach Sonny Dykes. TCU compiled a perfect 12–0 regular season record; its first undefeated regular season since 2010. After an overtime loss in the 2022 Big 12 Championship Game against Kansas State by a score of 31–28, TCU was selected as the third seed in the four-team College Football Playoff. In the semifinal round, TCU beat #2 Michigan in the Fiesta Bowl. They defeated Michigan by a score of 51–45, becoming the first Big 12 team to win a College Football Playoff game as well as make the CFP National Championship game. TCU lost the National Championship game to the Georgia Bulldogs with a 65–7 loss, and finished the season ranked #2 in both the AP and Coaches Polls.

== Offseason ==
Positions key
Offense	Defense	Special teams
QB — Quarterback; RB — Running back; FB — Fullback; WR — Wide receiver; TE — Tight end; OL — Offensive lineman; T — Tackle; G — Guard; C — Center	DL — Defensive lineman; DT — Defensive tackle (Note: Includes nose tackle (NT)); DE — Defensive end; EDGE — Edge rusher; LB — Linebacker (Note: Includes middle linebacker (MLB/MIKE), weakside linebacker (WILL), strongside linebacker (SAM), off-ball linebacker, and outside linebacker (OLB)); DB — Defensive back; CB — Cornerback; S — Safety (Note: Includes free safety (FS) and strong safety (SS))	K — Kicker (Note: Also known as a placekicker (PK)); P — Punter; LS — Long snapper; RS — Return specialist (Note: Includes kickoff and punt returners)

=== Departures ===
==== Outgoing transfers ====
7 Horned Frog players elected to enter the NCAA Transfer Portal after the 2021 season.

Name	No.	Pos.	Height	Weight	Year	Hometown	New school
Mikel Barkley	#2	WR	5'11"	170	Junior	Tallahassee, FL	Transferred to Toledo
Zach Evans	#6	RB	5'11"	212	Sophomore	Houston, TX	Transferred to Ole Miss
Khari Coleman	#11	DE	6'2"	221	Sophomore	New Orleans, LA	Transferred to Ole Miss
Ahmonte Watkins	#19	RB/DB	5'11"	190	Freshman	Houston, TX	Transferred to New Mexico State
Ochaun Mathis	#32	DE	6'5"	257	(redshirt) Junior	Manor, TX	Transferred to Nebraska
Patrick Jenkins	#91	DT	6'2"	287	Sophomore	New Orleans, LA	Transferred to Tulane
Earl Barquet	#97	DT	6'3"	277	Sophomore	Marrero, LA	Transferred to USC

=== Arrivals ===
==== Incoming transfers ====
Name	No.	Pos.	Height	Weight	Year	Hometown	Old School
Mark Perry	#3	DB	6'0"	215	Junior	Rancho Cucamonga, CA	Colorado
Emani Bailey	#9	RB	5'9"	200	Junior	Denton, TX	Louisiana
Terrence Cooks	#12	LB	6'2"	225	(redshirt) Freshman	Pearland, TX	Texas
Ish Burdine	#18	DB	6'1"	200	Junior	Slidell, LA	Missouri
Jared Wiley	#19	TE	6'7"	255	Senior	Temple, TX	Texas
Corey Wren	#21	RB	5'10"	200	Junior	New Orleans, LA	Florida State
Josh Newton	#24	DB	6'0"	195	Junior	Monroe, LA	Louisiana-Monroe
Ezra Dotson-Oyetade	#52	OL	6'3"	285	(redshirt) Freshman	Garland, TX	Arizona State
Robby Rochester	#55	OL	6'5"	290	Sophomore	Southlake, TX	Connecticut
Alan Ali	#56	OL	6'5"	300	Senior	Fort Worth, TX	SMU
Johnny Hodges	#57	LB	6'2"	240	Junior	Darnestown, MD	Navy
Caleb Fox	#90	DL	6'3"	295	Junior	The Woodlands, TX	Stephen F. Austin
Tymon Mitchell	#91	DL	6'3"	315	Junior	Nashville, TN	Georgia
Lwal Uguak	#96	DL	6'5"	271	Senior	Edmonton, AB	Connecticut

== Preseason ==
=== Big 12 media poll ===
The preseason poll was released on July 7, 2022.

Big 12 media poll
Predicted finish	Team	Votes (1st place)
1	Baylor (17)	365
2	Oklahoma (12)	354
3	Oklahoma State (9)	342
4	Texas (2)	289
5	Kansas State	261
6	Iowa State (1)	180
7	TCU	149
8	West Virginia	147
9	Texas Tech	119
10	Kansas	48

=== Preseason Big-12 awards ===
2022 Preseason All-Big 12 teams

Position	Player	Class
Offense
WR	Quentin Johnston	Junior
Defense
DB	Tre Tomlinson	Senior

== Schedule ==
Date	Time	Opponent	Rank	Site	TV	Result	Attendance
September 2	9:00 p.m.	at Colorado*		Folsom Field; Boulder, CO	ESPN	W 38–13	47,868
September 10	7:00 p.m.	Tarleton State*		Amon G. Carter Stadium; Fort Worth, TX	ESPN+	W 59–17	43,197
September 24	11:00 a.m.	at SMU*		Gerald J. Ford Stadium; University Park, TX (rivalry)	ESPNU	W 42–34	35,569
October 1	11:00 a.m.	No. 18 Oklahoma		Amon G. Carter Stadium; Fort Worth, TX	ABC	W 55–24	49,095
October 8	11:00 a.m.	at No. 19 Kansas	No. 17	David Booth Kansas Memorial Stadium; Lawrence, KS (College GameDay)	FS1	W 38–31	47,233
October 15	2:30 p.m.	No. 8 Oklahoma State	No. 13	Amon G. Carter Stadium; Fort Worth, TX	ABC	W 43–40 ^{2OT}	49,594
October 22	7:00 p.m.	No. 17 Kansas State	No. 8	Amon G. Carter Stadium; Fort Worth, TX	FS1	W 38–28	47,881
October 29	11:00 a.m.	at West Virginia	No. 7	Milan Puskar Stadium; Morgantown, WV	ESPN	W 41–31	50,426
November 5	11:00 a.m.	Texas Tech	No. 7	Amon G. Carter Stadium; Fort Worth, TX (rivalry, Big Noon Kickoff)	FOX	W 34–24	44,760
November 12	6:30 p.m.	at No. 18 Texas	No. 4	Darrell K Royal–Texas Memorial Stadium; Austin, TX (rivalry, College GameDay)	ABC	W 17–10	104,203
November 19	11:00 a.m.	at Baylor	No. 4	McLane Stadium; Waco, TX (rivalry, Big Noon Kickoff)	FOX	W 29–28	44,393
November 26	3:00 p.m.	Iowa State	No. 4	Amon G. Carter Stadium; Fort Worth, TX	FOX	W 62–14	44,846
December 3	11:00 a.m.	vs. No. 10 Kansas State	No. 3	AT&T Stadium; Arlington, TX (Big 12 Championship Game, College GameDay)	ABC	L 28–31 ^{OT}	69,335
December 31	3:00 p.m.	vs. No. 2 Michigan*	No. 3	State Farm Stadium; Glendale, AZ (Fiesta Bowl–CFP Semifinal)	ESPN	W 51–45	71,723
January 9, 2023	6:30 p.m.	vs. No. 1 Georgia*	No. 3	SoFi Stadium; Inglewood, CA (CFP National Championship)	ESPN	L 7–65	72,628
*Non-conference game; Rankings from AP Poll (and CFP Rankings, after November 1) - Released prior to game; All times are in Central time

== Game summaries ==
=== at Colorado ===
TCU Horned Frogs (0–0, 0–0) vs Colorado Buffaloes (0–0, 0–0)

Quarter	1	2	3	4	Total
Horned Frogs	0	7	10	21	38
Buffaloes	3	3	0	7	13

at Folsom Field • Boulder, Colorado

- Date: September 2
- Game time: 9:00 p.m. CST
- Game weather: Temperature: 84 °F (29 °C) • Wind: NE at 12 miles per hour (19 km/h) • Weather: Cloudy
- Game attendance: 47,868
- Referee: Matthew Richards
- TV announcers (ESPN): Roy Philpott, Andre Ware, Paul Carcaterra

Game information

1st quarter

- (4:44) COL – Cole Becker 37-yard field goal (Drive: 9 plays, 43 yards, 4:37; Colorado 3–0)

2nd quarter

- (14:36) TCU – Derius Davis 60-yard punt return, Griffin Kell kick (Drive: 6 plays, 11 yards, 3:16; TCU 7–3)
- (7:38) COL – Cole Becker 43-yard field goal (Drive: 12 plays, 50 yards, 6:58; TCU 7–6)

3rd quarter

- (11:56) TCU – Emari Demercado 43-yard run, Griffin Kell kick (Drive: 5 plays, 75 yards, 3:04; TCU 14–6)
- (3:45) TCU – Griffin Kell 33-yard field goal (Drive: 12 plays, 55 yards, 6:35; TCU 17–6)

4th quarter

- (10:55) TCU – Kendre Miller 3-yard run, Griffin Kell kick (Drive: 10 plays, 80 yards, 4:23; TCU 24–6)
- (7:55) TCU – Derius Davis 27-yard run, Griffin Kell kick (Drive: 2 plays, 32 yards, 0:50; TCU 31–6)
- (3:15) TCU – Sam Jackson 7-yard run, Griffin Kell kick (Drive: 5 plays, 81 yards, 2:45; TCU 38–6)
- (1:13) COL – Jordyn Tyson 23-yard pass from J. T. Shrout, Cole Becker kick (Drive: 8 plays, 75 yards, 2:02; TCU 38–13)

Statistics	TCU	Colorado
First downs	17	20
Total yards	413	348
Rushes/yards	30-275	29-113
Passing yards	138	235
Passing: Comp–Att–Int	15-23-0	26-41-0
Time of possession	26:42	33:18

Team	Category	Player	Statistics
TCU	Passing	Chandler Morris	13/20, 111 yards
TCU	Rushing	Kendre Miller	8 carries, 52 yds, TD
TCU	Receiving	Savion Williams	3 receptions, 31 yards
Colorado	Passing	J. T. Shrout	13/23, 157 yards, TD
Colorado	Rushing	Brendon Lewis	8 carries, 42 yards
Colorado	Receiving	Daniel Arias	4 receptions, 66 yards

=== Tarleton State (FCS) ===
Tarleton State Texans (1–0) vs TCU Horned Frogs (1–0, 0–0)

Quarter	1	2	3	4	Total
Texans	0	7	10	0	17
Horned Frogs	21	17	14	7	59

at Amon G. Carter Stadium • Fort Worth, Texas

- Date: September 10
- Game time: 7:00 p.m. CST
- Game weather: Temperature: 88 °F (31 °C) • Wind: NE at 7 miles per hour (11 km/h) • Weather: Sunny
- Game attendance: 43,197
- Referee: David Alvarez
- TV announcers (ESPN+): Mark Neely, Charles Arbuckle

Game information

1st quarter
2nd quarter
3rd quarter
4th quarter

Statistics	Tarleton State	TCU
First downs	13	28
Total yards	295	630
Rushes/yards	28-85	37-180
Passing yards	210	450
Passing: Comp–Att–Int	11-26-2	28-34-0
Time of possession	25:18	34:42

Team	Category	Player	Statistics
Tarleton State	Passing	Beau Allen	11/25, 210 yards, TD, 2 INT
Tarleton State	Rushing	Braelon Bridges	9 carries, 32 yards
Tarleton State	Receiving	Darius Cooper	6 receptions, 117 yards, TD
TCU	Passing	Max Duggan	23/29, 390 yards, 5 TD
TCU	Rushing	Kendre Miller	13 carries, 56 yards, TD
TCU	Receiving	Jordan Hudson	5 receptions, 76 yards, TD

=== at SMU ===
TCU Horned Frogs (2–0, 0–0) vs SMU Mustangs (2–1, 0–0)

Quarter	1	2	3	4	Total
Horned Frogs	14	14	0	14	42
Mustangs	0	14	7	13	34

at Gerald J. Ford Stadium • University Park, Texas

- Date: September 24
- Game time: 11:00 a.m. CST
- Game weather: Temperature: 87 °F (31 °C) • Wind: SW at 6 miles per hour (9.7 km/h) • Weather: Sunny
- Game attendance: 35,569
- Referee: Derek Anderson
- TV announcers (ESPNU): John Schriffen and Rene Ingoglia

Game information

1st quarter

- TCU – Savion Williams 19-yard pass from Max Duggan (Griffin Kell kick), 12:33. Horned Frogs 7–0. Drive: 5 plays, 74 yards, 2:22.
- TCU – Kendre Miller 28-yard run (Griffin Kell kick), 0:51. Horned Frogs 14–0. Drive: 9 plays, 81 yards, 3:34.

2nd quarter

- SMU – Tre Siggers 1-yard run (Collin Rogers kick), 11:18. Horned Frogs 14–7. Drive: 13 plays, 75 yards, 4:33.
- TCU – Jared Wiley 8-yard pass from Max Duggan (Griffin Kell kick), 9:16. Horned Frogs 21–7. Drive: 4 plays, 43 yards, 1:51.
- TCU – Derius Davis 80-yard pass from Maz Duggan (Griffin Kell kick), 6:39. Horned Frogs 28–7. Drive: 1 play, 80 yards, 0:11.
- SMU – Rashee Rice 19-yard pass from Tanner Mordecai (Collin Rogers kick), 1:57. Horned Frogs 28–14. Drive: 12 plays, 75 yards, 4:42.

3rd quarter

- SMU – Tre Siggers 1-yard run (Collin Rogers kick), 3:33. Horned Frogs 28–21. Drive: 10 plays, 98 yards, 3:16.

4th quarter

- TCU – Emari Demercado 1-yard run (Griffin Kell kick), 8:14. Horned Frogs 35–21. Drive: 6 plays, 37 yards, 3:11.
- SMU – Tre Siggers 2-yard run (pass failed), 5:14. Horned Frogs 35–27. Drive: 8 plays, 75 yards, 3:00.
- TCU – Emari Demercado 63-yard run (Griffin Kell kick), 2:31. Horned Frogs 42–27. Drive: 5 plays, 72 yards, 2:42.
- SMU – Jake Bailey 35-yard pass from Tanner Mordecai (Collin Rogers kick), 1:04. Horned Frogs 42–34. Drive: 10 plays, 75 yards, 1:27.

Statistics	TCU	SMU
First downs	21	27
Total yards	487	476
Rushes/yards	35-191	37-104
Passing yards	296	372
Passing: Comp–Att–Int	23-30-0	27-49-2
Time of possession	31:18	28:42

Team	Category	Player	Statistics
TCU	Passing	Max Duggan	22/29, 278 yards, 3 TD
TCU	Rushing	Kendre Miller	17 carries, 142 yards, TD
TCU	Receiving	Derius Davis	3 receptions, 78 yards, TD
SMU	Passing	Tanner Mordecai	27/49, 372 yards, 2 TD, 2 INT
SMU	Rushing	Tre Siggers	19 carries, 60 yards, 3 TD
SMU	Receiving	Jake Bailey	8 receptions, 163 yards, TD

=== No. 18 Oklahoma ===
No. 18 Oklahoma Sooners (3–1, 0–1) vs TCU Horned Frogs (3–0, 0–0)

Quarter	1	2	3	4	Total
No. 18 Sooners	10	7	0	7	24
Horned Frogs	27	14	14	0	55

at Amon G. Cater Stadium • Fort Worth, Texas

- Date: October 1st
- Game time: 11:00 a.m. CST
- Game weather: Temperature: 72 °F (22 °C) • Wind: SE at 4 miles per hour (6.4 km/h) • Weather: Sunny
- Game attendance: 49,095
- Referee: Tuta Salaam
- TV announcers (ABC): Mark Jones (play-by-play), Robert Griffin III (analyst), Quint Kessenich (sideline)

Game information

1st quarter

- (12:45) TCU – Max Duggan 19 yard pass to Savion Williams, Griffin Kell kick (Drive: 4 plays, 46 yards, 1:18; TCU 7–0)
- (9:49) OKLA – Zach Schmit 43 yard FG (Drive: 5 plays, 19 yards, 0:56; TCU 7–3)
- (8:35) TCU – Max Duggan 73 yard pass to Taye Barber, Griffin Kell XP Failed (Drive: 3 plays, 75 yards, 1:14; TCU 13–3)
- (7:17) TCU – Max Duggan 67 yard rush, Griffin Kell kick (Drive: 1 play, 67 yards, 0:11; TCU 20–3)
- (2:15) OKLA – Eric Gray 1 yard rush, Zach Schmit kick (Drive: 4 plays, 76 yards, 1:32; TCU 20–10)
- (0:07) TCU – Kendre Miller 15 yard rush, Griffin Kell kick (Drive: 6 plays, 75 yards, 2:08; TCU 27–10)

2nd quarter

- (10:30) TCU – Emari Demercado 1 yard rush, Griffin Kell kick (Drive: 9 plays, 89 yards, 3:50; TCU 34–10)
- (8:49) OKLA – Jovantae Barnes 20 yard rush, Zach Schmit kick (Drive: 7 plays, 65 yards, 1:41; TCU 34–17)
- (1:34) TCU – Max Duggan 62 yard pass to Gunnar Henderson, Griffin Kell kick (Drive: 6 plays, 89 yards, 2:28; TCU 41–17)

3rd quarter

- (9:30) TCU – Kendre Miller 69 yard rush, Griffin Kell kick (Drive: 3 plays, 80 yards, 1:09; TCU 48–17)
- (1:40) TCU – Max Duggan 2 yard rush, Griffin Kell kick (Drive: 6 plays, 67 yards, 2:49; TCU 55–17)

4th quarter

- (11:24) OKLA – Jovantae Barns 1 yard rush, Zach Schmit kick (Drive: 14 plays, 73 yards, 5:10; TCU 55–24)

Statistics	No. 18 Oklahoma	TCU
First downs	22	29
Total yards	355	668
Rushes/yards	49-179	41-361
Passing yards	176	307
Passing: Comp–Att–Int	14-32-0	24-34-0
Time of possession	27:11	32:49

Team	Category	Player	Statistics
No. 18 Oklahoma	Passing	Dillon Gabriel	7/16, 126 yards
No. 18 Oklahoma	Rushing	Jovantae Barnes	18 carries, 100 yards, 2 TD
No. 18 Oklahoma	Receiving	Brayden Willis	2 receptions, 81 yards
TCU	Passing	Max Duggan	23/33, 302 yards, 3 TD
TCU	Rushing	Kendre Miller	13 carries, 136 yards, 2 TD
TCU	Receiving	Taye Barber	3 receptions, 107 yards, 1 TD

=== at No. 19 Kansas (College GameDay) ===
No. 17 TCU Horned Frogs (4–0, 1–0) vs No. 19 Kansas Jayhawks (5–0, 2–0)

Quarter	1	2	3	4	Total
No. 17 Horned Frogs	3	7	21	7	38
No. 19 Jayhawks	0	3	21	7	31

at David Booth Kansas Memorial Stadium • Lawrence, Kansas

- Date: October 8
- Game time: 11:00 a.m. CST
- Game weather: Temperature: 56 °F (13 °C) • Wind: SW at 3 miles per hour (4.8 km/h) • Weather: Sunny
- Game attendance: 47,233
- Referee: Steve Baron
- TV announcers (FS1): Jason Benetti, Brock Huard

Game information

1st quarter

- TCU 10:46 Griffin Kell 39 yard field goal, 10–57 yards 4:10 TCU 3–0

2nd quarter

- TCU 3:26 Kendre Miller 1 yard run (Griffin Kell kick) 6–99 yards 2:36, 10–0 TCU
- KU 0:36 Jacob Borcila 40 yard field goal 8–53 2:50, 10–3 TCU

3rd quarter

- KU 12:59 Jason Bean 12 yard pass Mason Fairchild, (Jacob Borcila kick) 4–75 2:01, 10–10
- KU 7:36 Jason Bean 8 yard pass to Luke Grimm (Jacob Borcila kick) 5–40 2:06, KU 17–10
- TCU 6:29 Max Duggan 51 yard pass to Derius Davis (Griffin Kell kick) 4–61 yards 1:03 17–17
- TCU 3:59 Max Duggan 3 yard run (Griffin Kell kick) 5–26 yards 1:00 TCU 24–17
- KU 1:50 Jason Bean 38 yard pass to Quentin Skinner (Jacob Borcila kick) 4–72 2:05 24–24
- TCU 0:23 Max Duggan 25 yard pass to Taye Barber (Griffin Kell kick) 5–50 1:27 TCU 31–24

4th quarter

- KU 4:21 Jason Bean 29 yard pass to Quentin Skinner (Jacob Borcila kick) 4–61 2:19 31–31
- TCU 1:36 Max Duggan 24 yard pass to Quentin Johnston (Griffin Kell kick) 6–68 2:36 TCU 38–31

Statistics	No. 17 TCU	No. 19 Kansas
First downs	21	22
Total yards	452	540
Rushes/yards	31-144	38-189
Passing yards	308	351
Passing: Comp–Att–Int	23-33-1	21-34-1
Time of possession	26:01	33:59

Team	Category	Player	Statistics
No. 17 TCU	Passing	Max Duggan	23/33, 308 yards, 3 TD, INT
No. 17 TCU	Rushing	Kendre Miller	18 carries, 88 yards, TD
No. 17 TCU	Receiving	Quentin Johnston	14 receptions, 206 yards, TD
No. 19 Kansas	Passing	Jason Bean	16/24, 262 yards, 4 TD, INT
No. 19 Kansas	Rushing	Devin Neal	15 carries, 88 yards
No. 19 Kansas	Receiving	Quentin Skinner	4 receptions, 98 yards, 2 TD

=== No. 8 Oklahoma State ===
No. 8 Oklahoma State Cowboys (5–0, 2–0) vs No. 13 TCU Horned Frogs (5–0, 2–0)

Quarter	1	2	3	4	OT	2OT	Total
No. 8 Cowboys	14	10	6	0	7	3	40
No. 13 Horned Frogs	7	6	3	14	7	6	43

at Amon G. Carter Stadium • Fort Worth, Texas

- Date: October 15
- Game time: 2:30 p.m. CST
- Game weather: Temperature: 91 °F (33 °C) • Wind: S at 12 miles per hour (19 km/h) • Weather: Sunny
- Game attendance: 49,594
- Referee: Kevin Boitmann
- TV announcers (ABC): Sean McDonough (play-by-play), Todd Blackledge (analyst) & Molly McGrath (sideline)

Game information

First Quarter

- (10:25) OSU – Spencer Sanders 29 yard rush, Tanner Brown kick (Drive: 6 plays, 73 yards, 2:32; OSU 7–0)
- (4:33) OSU – Spencer Sanders 8 yard rush, Tanner Brown kick (Drive: 9 plays, 78 yards, 3:42; OSU 14–0)
- (1:40) TCU – Max Duggan 1 yard rush, Griffin Kell kick (Drive: 7 plays, 75 yards, 2:53; OSU 14–7)

Second Quarter

- (13:32) OSU – Tanner Brown 35 yard FG (Drive: 4 plays, 7 yards, 1:28; OSU 17–7)
- (10:04) OSU – Spencer Sanders 22 yard pass to John Paul Richardson, Tanner Brown kick (Drive: 8 plays, 47 yards, 2:52; OSU 24–7)
- (3:38) TCU – Griffin Kell 47 yard FG (Drive: 4 plays, 1 yard, 1:29; OSU 24–10)
- (0:02) TCU – Griffin Kell 35 yard FG (Drive: 8 plays, 44 yards, 2:08; OSU 24–13)

Third Quarter

- (11:38) OSU – Tanner Brown 34 yard FG (Drive: 8 plays, 58 yards, 3:22; OSU 27–13)
- (5:51) TCU – Griffin Kell 34 yard FG (Drive: 12 plays, 54 yards, 5:41; OSU 27–16)
- (1:25) OSU – Tanner Brown 32 yard FG (Drive: 11 plays,60 yards, 4:26; OSU 30–16)

Fourth Quarter

- (9:22) TCU – Kendre Miller 3 yard rush, Griffin Kell kick (Drive: 5 plays, 47 yards, 2:06; OSU 30–23)
- (1:57) TCU – Max Duggan 10 yard pass to Jared Wiley, Griffin Kell kick (Drive: 8 plays, 94 yards, 3:20; Tied 30–30)

Overtime

- (0:00) TCU – Max Duggan 25 yard pass to Quentin Johnston, Griffin Kell kick (Drive: 2 plays, 25 yards, 0:00; TCU 37–30)
- (0:00) OSU – Dominic Richardson 1 yard rush, Tanner Brown kick (Drive: 5 plays, 25 yards, 0:00; Tied 37–37)

Second Overtime

- (0:00) OSU – Tanner Brown 52 yard FG (Drive: 4 plays, −10 yards, 0:00; OSU 40–37)
- (0:00) TCU – Kendre Miller 2 yard rush (Drive: 6 plays, 25 yards, 0:00; TCU 43–40)

Statistics	No. 8 Oklahoma State	No. 13 TCU
First downs	19	27
Total yards	386	510
Rushes/yards	41-141	43-224
Passing yards	245	286
Passing: Comp–Att–Int	16-36-1	23-40-0
Time of possession	26:55	33:05

Team	Category	Player	Statistics
No. 8 Oklahoma State	Passing	Spencer Sanders	16/36, 245 yards, TD, INT
No. 8 Oklahoma State	Rushing	Dominic Richardson	22 carries, 72 yards, TD
No. 8 Oklahoma State	Receiving	Dominic Richardson	3 receptions, 79 yards
No. 13 TCU	Passing	Max Duggan	23/40, 286 yards, 2 TD
No. 13 TCU	Rushing	Kendre Miller	22 carries, 104 yards, 2 TD
No. 13 TCU	Receiving	Quentin Johnston	8 receptions, 180 yards, TD

=== No. 17 Kansas State ===
No. 17 Kansas State Wildcats (5–1, 3–0) vs No. 8 TCU Horned Frogs (6–0, 3–0)

Quarter	1	2	3	4	Total
No. 17 Wildcats	7	21	0	0	28
No. 8 Horned Frogs	10	7	14	7	38

at Amon G. Carter Stadium • Fort Worth, Texas

- Date: October 22
- Game time: 7:00 p.m. CST
- Game weather: Temperature: 81 °F (27 °C) • Wind: SE at 22 miles per hour (35 km/h) • Weather: Clear
- Game attendance: 47,881
- Referee: Derek Anderson
- TV announcers (FS1): Tim Brando (play-by-play), Spencer Tillman (analyst)

Game information

1st quarter

- (10:42) TCU – Derius Davis 65-yard touchdown reception from Max Duggan, Griffin Kell kick (Drive: 6 plays, 83 yards, 2:32; TCU 7–0)
- (9:08) KSU – Kade Warner 28-yard touchdown reception from Will Howard, Chris Tennant kick (Drive: 4 plays, 74 yards, 1:28; Tied 7–7)
- (4:49) TCU – Griffin Kell 43-yard field goal (Drive: 11 plays, 48 yards, 4:12; TCU 10–7)

2nd quarter

- (14:56) KSU – Will Howard 1-yard touchdown run, Chris Tennant kick (Drive: 10 plays, 75 yards, 4:53; Kansas State 14–10)
- (10:44) KSU – Sammy Wheeler 9-yard touchdown reception from Will Howard, Chris Tennant kick (Drive: 4 plays, 55 yards, 0:56; Kansas State 21–10)
- (8:09) KSU – Deuce Vaughn 47-yard touchdown run, Chris Tennant kick (Drive: 4 plays, 68 yards, 1:35; Kansas State 28–10)
- (0:20) TCU – Jared Wiley 4-yard touchdown reception from Max Duggan, Griffin Kell kick (Drive: 10 plays, 91 yards, 3:12; Kansas State 28–17)

3rd quarter

- (8:12) TCU – Kendre Miller 2-yard touchdown run, Griffin Kell kick (Drive: 13 plays, 77 yards, 6:39; Kansas State 28–24)
- (3:45) TCU – Quentin Johnston 55-yard touchdown reception from Max Duggan, Griffin Kell kick (Drive: 4 plays, 74 yards, 1:25; TCU 31–28)

4th quarter

- (12:14) TCU – Kendre Miller 9-yard touchdown run, Griffin Kell kick (Drive: 4 plays, 30 yards, 1:41; TCU 38–28)

Statistics	No. 17 Kansas State	No. 8 TCU
First downs	15	26
Total yards	390	495
Rushes/yards	30-158	56-215
Passing yards	232	280
Passing: Comp–Att–Int	14-23-2	17-26-0
Time of possession	21:55	38:05

Team	Category	Player	Statistics
No. 17 Kansas State	Passing	Will Howard	13/20, 225 yards, 2 TD, INT
No. 17 Kansas State	Rushing	Deuce Vaughn	12 carries, 83 yards, TD
No. 17 Kansas State	Receiving	Malik Knowles	4 receptions, 69 yards
No. 8 TCU	Passing	Max Duggan	17/26, 280 yards, 3 TD
No. 8 TCU	Rushing	Kendre Miller	29 carries, 153 yards, 2 TD
No. 8 TCU	Receiving	Quentin Johnston	4 receptions, 74 yards, TD

=== at West Virginia ===
No. 7 TCU Horned Frogs (7–0, 4–0) vs West Virginia Mountaineers (3–4, 1–3)

Quarter	1	2	3	4	Total
No. 7 Horned Frogs	7	21	0	13	41
Mountaineers	7	14	3	7	31

at Milan Puskar Stadium • Morgantown, West Virginia

- Date: October 29
- Game time: 11:00 a.m. CST
- Game weather: Temperature: 59 °F (15 °C) • Wind: NE at 4 miles per hour (6.4 km/h) • Weather: Sunny
- Game attendance: 50,426
- Referee: Kevin Mar
- TV announcers (ESPN): Bob Wischusen and Roddy Jones

Game information

1st quarter

- WVU – CJ Donaldson 1-yard Run (Casey Legg Kick), 8:02. Mountaineers 7–0. Drive: 8 plays, 80 yards, 4:38.
- TCU – Taye Barber 71 Yd pass from Max Duggan (Griffin Kell Kick), 4:27. Tied 7-7. Drive: 3 plays, 67 yards, 1:35.

2nd quarter

- WVU – CJ Donaldson 1 Yd Run (Casey Legg Kick), 14:47. Mountaineers 14-7. Drive: 10 plays, 75 yards, 4:40.
- TCU - Quentin Johnston 55 Yd pass from Max Duggan (Griffin Kell Kick), 11:42. Tied 14-14. Drive: 5 plays, 75 yards, 3:05.
- TCU - Kendre Miller 51 Yd Run (Griffin Kell Kick), 7:00. Horned Frogs 21-14. Drive: 1 play, 51 yards, 0:08.
- WVU - Justin Johnson Jr. 5 Yd pass from JT Daniels (Casey Legg Kick), 1:35. Tied 21-21. Drive: 15 plays, 89 yards, 5:25.
- TCU - Emani Bailey 30 Yd Run (Griffin Kell Kick), 0:24. Horned Frogs 28-21. Drive: 7 plays, 73 yards, 1:11.

3rd quarter

- WVU – Casey Legg 33 Yd Field Goal, 11:05. Horned Frogs 28-24. Drive: 4 plays, 2 yards, 2:04.

4th quarter

- TCU – Griffin Kell 30 Yd Field Goal, 13:03. Horned Frogs 31-24. Drive: 14 plays, 84 yards, 7:07.
- TCU – Griffin Kell 46 Yd Field Goal, 9:11. Horned Frogs 34-24. Drive: 5 plays, 26 yards, 2:36.
- WVU – Reese Smith 23 Yd pass from JT Daniels (Casey Legg Kick), 4:12. Horned Frogs 34-31. Drive: 12 plays, 78 yards, 4:59.
- TCU – Savion Williams 29 Yd pass from Max Duggan (Griffin Kell Kick), 0:20. Horned Frogs 41-31. Drive: 7 plays, 50 yards, 2:33.

Statistics	No. 7 TCU	West Virginia
First downs	17	25
Total yards	494	430
Rushes/yards	27-153	40-155
Passing yards	341	275
Passing: Comp–Att–Int	16-28-1	23-39-1
Time of possession	23:44	36:16

Team	Category	Player	Statistics
No. 7 TCU	Passing	Max Duggan	16/28, 341 yards, 3 TD, INT
No. 7 TCU	Rushing	Kendre Miller	12 carries, 120 yards, TD
No. 7 TCU	Receiving	Taye Barber	4 receptions, 99 yards, TD
West Virginia	Passing	JT Daniels	23/39, 275 yards, 2 TD, INT
West Virginia	Rushing	CJ Donaldson	19 carries, 104 yards, 2 TD
West Virginia	Receiving	Sam James	6 receptions, 95 yards

=== Texas Tech (Big Noon Kickoff) ===
Texas Tech Red Raiders (4–4, 2–3) vs TCU Horned Frogs (8–0, 5–0)

Quarter	1	2	3	4	Total
Red Raiders	10	0	7	7	24
No. 7 Horned Frogs	7	6	0	21	34

at Amon G. Carter Stadium • Fort Worth, Texas

- Date: November 5
- Game time: 11:00 a.m. CST
- Game weather: Temperature: 51 °F (11 °C) • Wind: SW at 3 miles per hour (4.8 km/h) • Weather: Sunny
- Game attendance: 44,760
- Referee: Tuta Salaam
- TV announcers (FOX): Gus Johnson, Joel Klatt, Jenny Taft

Game information

1st quarter

- TCU – Derius Davis 82-yard punt return (Griffin Kell kick), 13:20. Horned Frogs 7–0.
- TTU – Jerand Bradley 47-yard pass from Behren Morton (Trey Wolff kick), 5:13. Tied 7–7. Drive: 3 plays, 80 yards, 0:41.
- TTU – Trey Wolff 29-yard field goal, 0:00. Red Raiders 10–7. Drive: 9 plays, 43 yards, 3:28.

2nd quarter

- TCU – Griffin Kell 40-yard field goal, 11:58. Tied 10–10. Drive: 7 plays, 47 yards, 3:02.
- TCU – Griffin Kell 30-yard field goal, 0:09. Horned Frogs 13–10. Drive: 11 plays, 71 yards, 3:55.

3rd quarter

- TTU – J. J. Sparkman 33-yard pass from Tyler Shough (Trey Wolff kick), 8:38. Red Raiders 17–13. Drive: 9 plays, 77 yards, 2:36.

4th quarter

- TCU – Kendre Miller 2-yard run (Griffin Kell kick), 13:25. Horned Frogs 20–17. Drive: 10 plays, 81 yards, 4:12.
- TCU – Derius Davis 23-yard pass from Max Duggan (Griffin Kell kick), 10:53. Horned Frogs 27–17. Drive: 3 plays, 34 yards, 1:28.
- TCU – Emari Demercado 16-yard pass from Max Duggan (Griffin Kell kick), 5:46. Horned Frogs 34–17. Drive: 6 plays, 45 yards, 3:42.
- TTU – Tyler Shough 3-yard run (Trey Wolff kick), 1:46. Horned Frogs 34–24. Drive: 7 plays, 96 yards, 1:48.

Statistics	Texas Tech	No. 7 Horned Frogs
First downs	20	24
Total yards	352	429
Rushes/yards	39-195	51-234
Passing yards	157	195
Passing: Comp–Att–Int	16-32-1	12-23-0
Time of possession	25:21	34:39

Team	Category	Player	Statistics
Texas Tech	Passing	Behren Morton	7/10, 79 yards, TD
Texas Tech	Rushing	Camron Valdez	3 carries, 71 yards
Texas Tech	Receiving	Jerand Bradley	2 receptions, 54 yards, TD
No. 7 TCU	Passing	Max Duggan	12/23, 195 yards, 2 TD
No. 7 TCU	Rushing	Kendre Miller	21 carries, 158 yards, TD
No. 7 TCU	Receiving	Taye Barber	3 receptions, 62 yards

=== at No. 18 Texas (College GameDay) ===
No. 4 TCU Horned Frogs (9–0, 6–0) vs No. 18 Texas Longhorns (6–3, 4–2)

Quarter	1	2	3	4	Total
No. 4 Horned Frogs	0	3	7	7	17
No. 18 Longhorns	0	0	3	7	10

at Darrell K Royal-Texas Memorial Stadium • Austin, Texas

- Date: November 12
- Game time: 6:45 p.m. CST
- Game weather: Sunny
- Game attendance: 104,203
- Referee: Michael Vandervelde
- TV announcers (ABC): Chris Fowler (play-by-play), Kirk Herbstreit (color), Holly Rowe (sideline)

Game information

1st quarter

No scoring plays

2nd quarter

- (1:20) TCU – Griffin Kell 34-yard field goal (Drive: 14 plays, 57 yards, 6:45; TCU 3–0)

3rd quarter

- (5:08) TCU – Kendre Miller 75-yard run, Griffin Kell kick (Drive: 4 plays, 93 yards, 1:50; TCU 10–0)
- (0:58) TEX – Bert Auburn 22-yard field goal (Drive: 12 plays, 71 yards, 4:10; TCU 10–3)

4th quarter

- (12:36) TCU – Quentin Johnston 31-yard pass from Max Duggan, Griffin Kell kick (Drive: 9 plays, 80 yards, 3:18; TCU 17–3)
- (4:25) TEX – Jahdae Barron 48-yard fumble recovery, Bert Auburn kick (TCU 17–10)

Statistics	No. 4 TCU	No. 18 Texas
First downs	19	14
Total yards	283	199
Rushes/yards	44-159	22-28
Passing yards	124	171
Passing: Comp–Att–Int	19-29-0	17-39-1
Time of possession	37:22	22:38

Team	Category	Player	Statistics
No. 7 TCU	Passing	Max Duggan	19/29, 124 yards, 1 TD
No. 7 TCU	Rushing	Kendre Miller	21 carries, 138 yards, TD
No. 7 TCU	Receiving	Quentin Johnston	3 receptions, 66 yards, TD
No. 18 Longhorns	Passing	Quinn Ewers	17/39, 171 yards, INT
No. 18 Longhorns	Rushing	Bijan Robinson	12 carries, 29 yards
No. 18 Longhorns	Receiving	Jordan Whittington	6 receptions, 78 yards

=== at Baylor (Big Noon Kickoff) ===
No. 4 TCU Horned Frogs (10–0, 7–0) vs Baylor Bears (6–4, 4–3)

Quarter	1	2	3	4	Total
No. 4 Horned Frogs	7	7	6	9	29
Bears	7	7	0	14	28

at McLane Stadium • Waco, Texas

- Date: November 19
- Game time: 11:00 a.m. CST
- Game weather: Temperature: 39 °F (4 °C) • Wind: N at 9 miles per hour (14 km/h) • Weather: Cloudy
- Game attendance: 44,393
- Referee: Scott Campbell
- TV announcers (FOX): Jason Benetti, Brock Huard, Bruce Feldman

Game information

1st quarter
2nd quarter
3rd quarter
4th quarter

Statistics	No. 4 TCU	Baylor
First downs	20	25
Total yards	442	501
Rushes/yards	27-115	46-232
Passing yards	327	269
Passing: Comp–Att–Int	24-36-1	21-30-1
Time of possession	26:02	33:58

Team	Category	Player	Statistics
No. 4 TCU	Passing	Max Duggan	24/35, 327 yards, TD, INT
No. 4 TCU	Rushing	Max Duggan	8 carries, 50 yards, TD
No. 4 TCU	Receiving	Taye Barber	5 receptions, 108 yards
Baylor	Passing	Blake Shapen	21/30, 269 yards, TD, INT
Baylor	Rushing	Craig Williams	19 carries, 112 yards
Baylor	Receiving	Monaray Baldwin	6 receptions, 123 yards

=== Iowa State ===
Iowa State Cyclones (4–7, 1–7) vs No. 4 TCU Horned Frogs (11–0, 8–0)

Quarter	1	2	3	4	Total
Cyclones	0	7	0	7	14
No. 4 Horned Frogs	24	10	21	7	62

at Amon G. Carter Stadium • Fort Worth, Texas

- Date: November 26
- Game time: 3:00 p.m. CST
- Game weather: Temperature: 49 °F (9 °C) • Wind: W at 14 miles per hour (23 km/h) • Weather: Cloudy
- Game attendance: 44,846
- Referee: Kevin Boltmann
- TV announcers (FOX): Jason Benetti (play-by-play), Brock Huard (analyst), Allison Williams (sideline)

Game information

1st quarter

- (10:13) TCU – Geor'quarius Spivey 19 Yd pass from Max Duggan (Griffin Kell Kick) (Drive: 9 plays, 73 yards, 4:41; TCU 7–0)
- (04:54) TCU – Griffin Kell 36 Yd Field Goal (Drive: 10 plays, 53 yards, 3:22; TCU 10–0)
- (02:15) TCU – Kendre Miller 25 Yd Run (Griffin Kell Kick) (Drive: 3 plays, 45 yards, 1:16; TCU 17–0)
- (02:03) TCU – Millard Bradford 36 Yd Interception Return (Griffin Kell Kick) (TCU 24–0)

2nd quarter

- (13:16) ISU – DeShawn Hankika 15 Yd pass from Hunter Dekkers (Jace Gilbert Kick) (Drive: 10 plays, 75 yards, 3:47; TCU 24–7)
- (11:29) TCU – Griffin Kell 54 Yd Field Goal (Drive: 4 plays, 0 yards, 1:38; TCU 27–7)
- (00:14) TCU – Kendre Miller 1 Yd Run (Griffin Kell Kick) (Drive: 6 plays, 22 yards, 1:09; TCU 34–7)

3rd quarter

- (06:25) TCU – Savion Williams 2 Yd pass from Max Duggan (Griffin Kell Kick) (Drive: 9 plays, 80 yards, 4:15; TCU 41–0)
- (02:00) TCU – Jordan Hudson 13 Yd pass from Max Duggan (Griffin Kell Kick) (Drive: 6 plays, 38 yards, 3:30; TCU 48–0)
- (01:02) TCU – Josh Newton 36 Yd Interception Return (Griffin Kell Kick) (TCU 55–7)

4th quarter

- (13:46) ISU – Deon Silas 19 Yd Run (Keegan Shackford Kick) (Drive: 5 plays, 75 yards, 2:16; TCU 55–14)
- (01:00) TCU – Jordan Hudson 2 Yd pass from Chandler Morris (Griffin Kell Kick) (Drive: 13 plays, 97 yards, 7:53; TCU 62–14)

Statistics	Iowa State	No. 4 TCU
First downs	19	21
Total yards	330	377
Rushes/yards	31-159	38-131
Passing yards	171	246
Passing: Comp–Att–Int	19-38-2	22-30-0
Time of possession	26:08	33:52

Team	Category	Player	Statistics
Iowa State	Passing	Hunter Dekkers	12/24, 106 yards, TD, INT
Iowa State	Rushing	Eli Sanders	7 carries, 91 yards
Iowa State	Receiving	Deshawn Hanika	3 receptions, 49 yards, TD
No. 4 TCU	Passing	Max Duggan	17/24, 212 yards, 3 TD
No. 4 TCU	Rushing	Kendre Miller	15 carries, 72 yards, 2 TD
No. 4 TCU	Receiving	Savion Williams	5 receptions, 48 yards, TD

=== No. 10 Kansas State (College GameDay) ===
No. 10 Kansas State Wildcats (9–3, 7–2) vs No. 3 TCU Horned Frogs (12–0, 9–0)

Quarter	1	2	3	4	OT	Total
No. 10 Wildcats	7	7	7	7	3	31
No. 3 Horned Frogs	7	3	7	11	0	28

at AT&T Stadium • Arlington, Texas

- Date: December 3
- Game time: 11:00 a.m. CST
- Game weather: Indoors
- Game attendance: 69,335
- TV announcers (ABC): Chris Fowler (play-by-play), Kirk Herbstreit (analysts), Holly Rowe (sideline reporter)

Game information

1st quarter

- (5:00) TCU - Taye Barber 1 Yd pass from Max Duggan (Griffin Kell Kick) (TCU 7-0)
- (0:15) KSU - Ben Sinnott 6 Yd pass from Will Howard (Ty Zentner Kick) (Tied 7-7)

2nd quarter

- (10:16) KSU - Will Howard 1 Yd Run (Ty Zentner Kick) (KSU 14-7)
- (0:29) TCU - Griffin Kell 42 Yd Field Goal (KSU 14-10)

3rd quarter

- (12:19) KSU - RJ Garcia II 25 Yd pass from Will Howard (Ty Zentner Kick) (KSU 21-10)
- (9:09) TCU - Kendre Miller 6 Yd Run (Griffin Kell Kick) (KSU 21-17)

4th quarter

- (11:27) KSU - Deuce Vaughn 44 Yd Run (Ty Zentner Kick) (KSU 28-17)
- (7:34) TCU - Griffin Kell 42 Yd Field Goal (KSU 28-20)
- (1:51) TCU - Max Duggan 8 Yd Run (Max Duggan Pass to Jared Wiley for 2-PT Conversion) (Tied 28-28)

OT

- (FG) KSU - Ty Zentner 31 Yd Field Goal (KSU wins 31-28)

Statistics	Kansas State	TCU
First downs	20	18
Total yards	404	469
Rushes/yards	44-205	37-218
Passing yards	199	251
Passing: Comp–Att–Int	18-32-0	18-36-1
Time of possession	32:00	28:00

Team	Category	Player	Statistics
Kansas State	Passing	Will Howard	18/32, 199 yards, 2 TD
Kansas State	Rushing	Deuce Vaughn	26 carries, 130 yards, TD
Kansas State	Receiving	Phillip Brooks	6 receptions, 48 yards
TCU	Passing	Max Duggan	18/36, 251 yards, TD, INT
TCU	Rushing	Max Duggan	15 carries, 110 yards, TD
TCU	Receiving	Quentin Johnston	4 receptions, 139 yards

=== No. 2 Michigan (Fiesta Bowl / CFP Semifinal) ===
No. 3 TCU Horned Frogs (12-1) vs No.2 Michigan Wolverines (13-0)

Quarter	1	2	3	4	Total
No. 3 Horned Frogs	14	7	20	10	51
No. 2 Wolverines	0	6	24	15	45

at State Farm Stadium • Glendale, Arizona

- Date: December 31
- Game time: 3:00 p.m. CST
- Game weather: Indoors
- Game attendance: 71,723
- Referee: Jason Autrey
- TV announcers (ESPN): Sean McDonough (play-by-play), Todd Blackledge (analysts), Molly McGrath (sideline reporter), Tiffany Blackmon (sideline reporter)
- Box score

Game information

1st quarter
2nd quarter
3rd quarter
4th quarter

Statistics	No. 3 TCU	No. 2 Wolverines
First downs	19	25
Total yards	488	528
Rushes/yards	41-263	40-186
Passing yards	225	342
Passing: Comp–Att–Int	14-29-2	21-35-2
Time of possession	27:35	32:25

Team	Category	Player	Statistics
No. 3 TCU	Passing	Max Duggan	14/29, 225 yards, 2 TD, 2 INT
No. 3 TCU	Rushing	Emari Demercado	17 carries, 150 yards, TD
No. 3 TCU	Receiving	Quentin Johnston	6 receptions, 163 yards, TD
No. 2 Michigan	Passing	J. J. McCarthy	20/34, 343 yards, 2 TD, 2 INT
No. 2 Michigan	Rushing	Donovan Edwards	23 carries, 119 yards
No. 2 Michigan	Receiving	Ronnie Bell	6 receptions, 135 yards, TD

=== No. 1 Georgia (National Championship) ===
No. 3 TCU Horned Frogs (13–1) vs No. 1 Georgia Bulldogs (14–0)

Quarter	1	2	3	4	Total
No. 3 Horned Frogs	7	0	0	0	7
No. 1 Bulldogs	17	21	14	13	65

at SoFi Stadium • Los Angeles, California

- Date: January 9
- Game time: 6:45 p.m. CST
- Game weather: Indoors
- Game attendance: 72,628
- Referee: Jeff Heaser (SEC)
- TV announcers (ESPN): Chris Fowler (play-by-play), Kirk Herbstreit (analysts), Molly McGrath (sideline reporter), Holly Rowe (sideline reporter)
- Box Score

Game information

1st quarter
2nd quarter
3rd quarter
4th quarter

Statistics	No. 3 TCU	No. 1 Georgia
First downs	9	32
Total yards	188	589
Rushes/yards	28-36	44-254
Passing yards	152	335
Passing: Comp–Att–Int	14-23-2	20-28-0
Time of possession	23:01	36:59

Team	Category	Player	Statistics
No. 3 TCU	Passing	Max Duggan	14/22, 152 yards, 2 INT
No. 3 TCU	Rushing	Emari Demercado	14 carries, 59 yards
No. 3 TCU	Receiving	Derius Davis	5 receptions, 101 yards
No. 1 Georgia	Passing	Stetson Bennett	18/25, 304 yards, 4 TD
No. 1 Georgia	Rushing	Kenny McIntosh	8 carries, 50 yards
No. 1 Georgia	Receiving	Brock Bowers	7 receptions, 152 yards, TD

== Personnel ==
=== Roster ===
2022 TCU Horned Frogs football team roster
Players
Coaches
Offense

Pos.	#	Name	Class
WR	0	Blair Conwright	Jr
WR	1	Quentin Johnston	Jr
QB	2	Chandler Morris	Fr
RB	3	Emari Demercado	Sr
WR	4	Taye Barber	Sr
WR	6	Chase Jackson	Fr
WR	7	Jordan Hudson	Fr
RB	9	Emani Bailey	Jr
QB	10	Josh Hoover	Fr
WR	11	Derius Davis	Sr
TE	12	Geor'Quarius Spivey	Sr
QB	13	Luke Pardee	So
WR	14	DJ Allen	Fr
QB	15	Max Duggan	Sr
QB	16	Sam Jackson	Fr
RB	17	Trent Battle	Fr
WR	18	Savion Williams	Jr
TE	19	Jared Wiley	Sr
WR	20	Christopher Chosen	So
RB	21	Corey Wren	Jr
WR	22	Major Everhart	Fr
RB	23	Trevor Ailey	Jr
RB	24	Brant Ahlfinger	Fr
WR	26	Caleb Medford	So
WR	27	Gunnar Henderson	Sr
QB	29	Jacob Porter	Fr
WR	30	Drew Scott	Jr
WR	32	Christian MacDonald	So
RB	33	Kendre Miller	Jr
WR	35	Colton Dobson	Fr
WR	38	Parker Clark	Fr
RB	40	Franklin Estrada	Fr
WR	41	Hunter Krepp	Fr
TE	42	Brent Matiscik	Jr
WR	43	Joe Staubach	Fr
TE	44	Ben Reppenhagen	So
TE	47	Carter Ware	Sr
TE	49	Austin Scheets	Fr
OL	52	Ezra Dotson-Oyetade	Fr
OL	53	John Lanz	Sr
OT	54	Quinton Harris	Fr
OL	55	Robby Rochester	So
OL	56	Alan Ali	Sr
OL	58	Altrique Barlow	So
OL	61	Riley Self	Fr
OL	66	Noah Bolticoff	Fr
OL	67	Hudson White	Fr
OL	68	Michael Nichols	So
OL	69	Gannon Gaubert	Fr
OL	70	Kris Dike	Sr
OL	71	Marcus Williams	Jr
OL	72	Jasper Lott	Fr
OL	74	Andrew Coker	Jr
OL	75	Brannon Brown	Jr
OL	76	Garrett Hayes	So
OL	77	Brandon Coleman	Jr
OL	78	Wes Harris	Sr
OL	79	Steve Avila	Sr
TE	80	D'Andre Rogers	Fr
WR	81	Chase Curtis	Jr
TE	82	Alex Honig	Fr
WR	83	Keagan Cunningham	Fr
TE	84	Dominic DiNunzio	Jr
WR	86	Curtis Raymond III	Sr
WR	87	Blake Nowell	So
WR	88	Quincy Brown	So
WR	89	Stayton Ankrom	Fr

Defense

Pos.	#	Name	Class
LB	0	Landyn Watson	Fr
CB	1	Tre Tomlinson	Sr
CB	2	Kee'Yon Stewart	Jr
S	3	Mark Perry	Jr
S	4	Namdi Obiazor	Jr
LB	6	Jamoi Hodge	Jr
S	7	D'Arco Perkins-McAllister	So
LB	9	Marcel Brooks	Sr
S	10	Chace Biddle	Fr
LB	12	Terrence Cooks Jr.	Fr
LB	13	Dee Winters	Sr
S	14	Abe Camara	Jr
S	15	Josh Foster	Sr
S	17	Deshawn McCuin	Jr
CB	18	Ish Burdine	Jr
LB	19	Shadrach Banks	So
CB	20	Ronald Lewis	Fr
CB	21	Noah Daniels	Sr
CB	22	Kyron Chambers	Fr
CB	23	Keontae Jenkins	So
CB	24	Josh Newton	Jr
LB	25	Wyatt Harris	Sr
S	26	Bud Clark	So
CB	27	Jaionte McMillan	So
S	28	Millard Bradford	Sr
CB	29	Marvin Covington	Fr
S	32	Kevin Ward	Fr
LB	33	Thomas Armstrong	Jr
LB	34	Zach Marcheselli	Jr
LB	36	Ryan Quintanar	Fr
LB	37	Palmer Nix	Sr
LB	39	Matthew Kerr	Fr
LB	41	TJ Willson	Fr
LB	43	Blake Baldwin	Fr
DL	44	Colt Ellison	Sr
S	46	Daveion Crawford	Jr
LB	47	Jake Boozer	Fr
CB	48	Zimbalist Odhams III	So
DL	49	Connor Lingren	Fr
DL	50	Doug Blue-Eli	So
LB	51	Luke Lingard	Fr
DL	52	Damonic Williams	Fr
LB	54	Luke Splaine	So
LB	57	Johnny Hodges	Jr
DL	59	Blake Jones	Fr
DL	90	Caleb Fox	Jr
DL	91	Tymon Mitchell	Jr
DE	92	Luke Dodds	Fr
DL	93	George Ellis	Sr
DL	94	Micheal Ibukun-Obeyode	Fr
DL	95	Terrell Cooper	Sr
DL	96	Lwal Uguak	Sr
DL	97	Paul Oyewale	Fr
DL	98	Dylan Horton	Sr
DL	99	Soni Misi	Sr

Special teams

Pos.	#	Name	Class
PK	25	James Koshakji	Jr
P	31	Jordy Sandy	Sr
LS	36	Joe Laterza	Fr
LS	38	Jack Stein	Fr
PK	39	Griffin Kell	Sr
K	97	Easton Black	Fr
LS	98	Logan Frederic	Fr

Head coach

- Sonny Dykes

Coordinators/assistant coaches

- Malcolm Kelly (assistant head coach /outside receivers)
- A. J. Ricker (co-offensive coordinator/offensive line)
- Jamarkus McFarland (defensive line)

Legend

- (C) Team captain
- (S) Suspended
- (I) Ineligible
- Injured
- Redshirt

Roster
Last update: November 9th, 2022

=== Coaching staff ===
Coach	Title	Consecutive Year at TCU	Previous job
Sonny Dykes	Head Coach	1st	SMU (HC)
Garrett Riley	OC/QB	1st	SMU (OC/QB)
Joe Gillespie	DC/LB	1st	Tulsa (DC)
Anthony Jones Jr.	RB	1st	Memphis (RB)
A. J. Ricker	Co-OC/OL	1st	SMU (Co-OC/OL)
Mark Tommerdahl	STC	1st	Texas Tech (STC)
Paul Gonzales	S	11th	Pacific (DB)
Doug Meacham	IWR/TE	6th	Kansas (OC)
Malcolm Kelly	OWR/AHC	4th	Houston (offensive analyst)
Carlton Buckels	CB	1st	Tulsa (CB)
Jamarkus McFarland	DL	1st	SFA (AHC/DL)

== Rankings ==
Ranking movements Legend: ██ Increase in ranking ██ Decrease in ranking — = Not ranked RV = Received votes
	Week															
Poll	Pre	1	2	3	4	5	6	7	8	9	10	11	12	13	14	Final
AP	—	—	—	—	RV	17	13	8	7	7	4	4	4	3	3	2
Coaches	—	RV	RV	RV	RV	18	15	8	7	7	4	4	4	3	4	2
CFP	Not released									7	4	4	4	3	3	Not released

== Players drafted into the NFL ==
Round	Pick	Player	Position	NFL club
1	21	Quentin Johnston	WR	Los Angeles Chargers
2	36	Steve Avila	OG	Los Angeles Rams
3	71	Kendre Miller	RB	New Orleans Saints
4	109	Dylan Horton	DE	Houston Texans
4	125	Derius Davis	WR	Los Angeles Chargers
6	182	Tre Tomlinson	CB	Los Angeles Rams
6	216	Dee Winters	LB	San Francisco 49ers
7	239	Max Duggan	QB	Los Angeles Chargers
