= A. J. Ricker =

American football coach (born 1987)

Biographical details
- Born: March 29, 1980 (age 46); Spring, Texas, U.S.

Playing career
- 1999–2003: Missouri
- 2004: Chicago Bears
- 2005: Rhein Fire
- 2006–2007: Tampa Bay Storm
- Position: Center

Coaching career (HC unless noted)
- 2006–2007: Western Michigan (GA)
- 2008: Western Michigan (OL)
- 2009: Saint Joseph's (IN) (OL)
- 2010: Saint Joseph's (IN)
- 2011–2012: Western Michigan (RCG/OL)
- 2013: Illinois (OL)
- 2014–2015: Missouri (OL)
- 2016: Houston (off. analyst)
- 2017: Oklahoma State (off. analyst)
- 2018: Kansas (OL)
- 2019: SMU (OL)
- 2020: SMU (co-OC/OL)
- 2021–2026: TCU (co-OC/OL)

Head coaching record
- Overall: 5–5

Accomplishments and honors

Championships
- 1 GLFC (2010)

A. J. Ricker (born March 29, 1980) is an American college football coach. He was most recently the co-offensive coordinator and offensive line coach for Texas Christian University, a position he held from 2021-2026. He was the head football coach at Saint Joseph's College in Collegeville, Indiana, in 2010.

== College career ==
In his college career Ricker played in 47 career games and was a two-time team captain. He made the All Big-12 team three times: a third-team selection in 2001, second-team selection in 2002, and a first-team selection in 2003.

== Professional career ==
After not being selected in the 2004 NFL draft, Ricker signed with the Chicago Bears as an undrafted free agent. However he was cut before the regular season started. Ricker went on to NFL Europe where he signed with the Rhein Fire; he also had a stint in the Arena Football League for two years.

== Coaching career ==
Ricker started his coaching career with Western Michigan as a graduate assistant before being promoted to be their offensive line coach. He then headed to St. Josephs College as their offensive line coach. However he was promoted to be St. Josephs next head coach after their head coach Lou Esposito left for Western Michigan. He then returned to Western Michigan as their offensive line coach. From there he moved on to Illinois as their offensive line coach. After one year at Illinois, Ricker took on the offensive line coaching position at Missouri, where he stayed for two years. Ricker then took on offensive analyst role at Houston for the 2016 season. Ricker's nest stop for the 2017 season was Oklahoma State as an offensive analyst. Ricker then got another offensive line coaching job at Kansas for the 2018 season. The next stop for Ricker was at SMU as their offensive line coach for the 2019 season. After one season with SMU he was promoted to be their co-offensive coordinator and offensive line coach. After a stellar season at SMU as their co-offensive coordinator he was named a nominee for the Broyles Award, given to the best assistant coach in the country. He was hired by TCU to be their co-offensive coordinator and offensive line coach. In his time with TCU he helped the program to the National Championship as well as helping quarterback Max Duggan become a Heisman Trophy finalist. Ricker was fired by TCU on October 25, 2026, after a 3-4 start to the season.

== Head coaching record ==
Year	Team	Overall	Conference	Standing	Bowl/playoffs
Saint Joseph's Pumas (Great Lakes Football Conference) (2010)
2010	Saint Joseph's	5–5	2–1	T–1st	
Saint Joseph's:		5–5	2–1		
Total:		5–5			
National championship Conference title Conference division title or championship game berth
