= West Alabama Tigers football =

Football team of the University of West Alabama

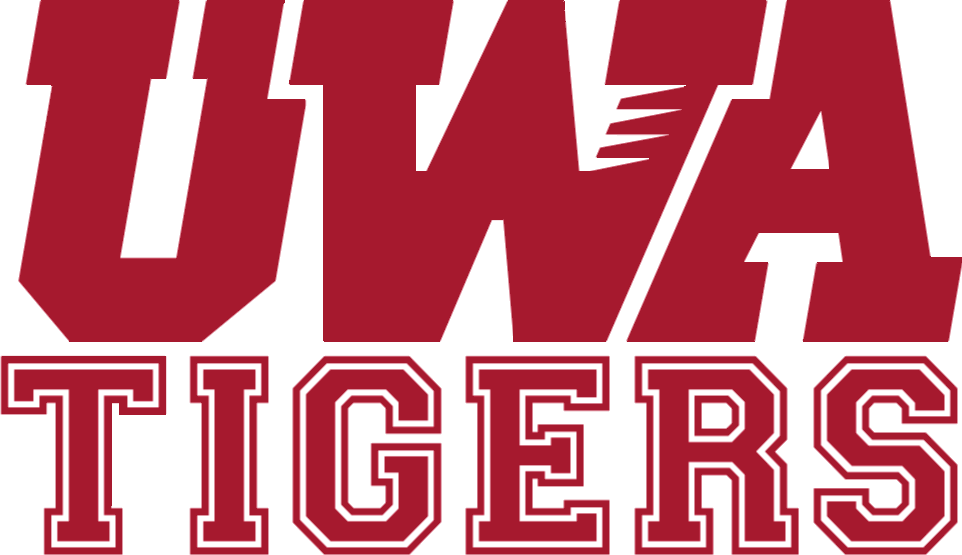
- First season: 1938; 88 years ago
- Athletic director: Brett Gilliland
- Head coach: Scott Cochran; 2nd season, 5–4 (.556)
- Location: Livingston, Alabama
- Stadium: Tiger Stadium (capacity: 7,000)
- NCAA division: Division II
- Conference: Gulf South Conference
- Colors: Red and white
- All-time record: 326–431–18 (.432)
- Bowl record: 5–6 (.455)

NAIA national championships
- NAIA Division I: 1971

Conference championships
- 1940, 1949, 1971, 2012, 2013, 2017
- Rivalries: North Alabama (rivalry)
- Fight song: The Fight Song
- Mascot: Luie the Tiger
- Marching band: "West Alabama Marching Band"
- Website: UWAAthletics.com

The West Alabama Tigers football program is the intercollegiate American football team for the University of West Alabama located in the U.S. state of Alabama. The team competes in the NCAA Division II and is a member of the Gulf South Conference. West Alabama's first football team was fielded in 1938. The team plays its home games at the 7,000 seat Tiger Stadium in Livingston, Alabama. The Tigers are coached by Scott Cochran.

== History ==
West Alabama's football team was first fielded in 1931 when the school was known as Livingston State Teachers College. However, intercollegiate competition for all the university’s athletics was not scheduled until seven years later. In 1938, they competed in four games against Marion Institute, Jacksonville State, Demopolis A.S, and Troy State, all of whom were local teams. LSTC finished the season 2–2. That year also marked the start of World War II which led to a decline in college enrollment across the United States. Therefore, LSTC fielded no athletic teams from 1942 to 1945. In 1944, Dr. William Wilson Hill became president of the university and instantly started recruiting students to enroll. The return of males to campus reestablished an interest in sports. After a three-year hiatus, the football team returned to action under the guidance of new head coach E.G McCollum. They opened their season with the first of many future match-ups against Mississippi College, which resulted in a 24–14 loss. Also, that season, LSTC renewed its rivalry with eventual Gulf South Conference foes Troy State and Delta State. The team concluded the season with a 6–3 record. Due to success of the season, McCollum resigned to pursue a bigger opportunity elsewhere. Following two dismal seasons from 1947 and 1948, LSTC made a bold move and hired former University of Alabama star Vaughn Mancha as the fourth head coach in team history. Mancha at the time was only 28 years old with no prior coaching experience. The former two-time All-American had also recently completed his first and only season in the NFL as a member of the Boston Yanks. Under Mancha, the team experienced immediate success. In his first season, he led LSTC to one of the biggest accomplishments in school history, a 13–6 win over Florida State. The team also concluded the regular season 7–1–1, which at the time marked the best record in school history. The historical season earned LSTC right to play in the Paper Bowl against Jacksonville State. JSU won the hard-fought defensive affair, 12–7. Until 1952, the Tigers played home games at Livingston High School. From then on, all their home games were played at Tiger Stadium, a 7,000-capacity stadium located on filled in land that was previously known as "Crawdad Creek." The stadium was built to fill the need for an on-campus stadium. Next season was once again successful as the team finished 6–3–1. However, they could not duplicate the accomplishments of the previous season. During Mancha’s third season, the team started off 2–4 and showed heavy signs of decline until putting on a strong finish to end the season 5–5. This season would mark the last in Mancha’s tenure at LSTC as he decided to take over as defensive coordinator at Florida State. Mancha departed with an 18–10–2 overall record.

The Tigers underwent a 15-year-long drought without a winning season after the departure of Mancha. The team’s most success came in 1965 when they finished 5–4. Their luck finally started to change after hiring Morris Higginbotham in 1967. Before coming to Livingston, he was one of the most successful high school coaches in Alabama, compiling a 111–27–8 record. The native of Birmingham, earned Alabama Collegiate Conference Coach of the Year honors for the efforts of his 1968 team that featured a 9–2 mark and an appearance in the Peanut Bowl in Dothan, Alabama. Higginbotham only remained at the school for three seasons leading the Tigers to a 19–9–2 record. Higginbotham was succeeded by assistant head coach Mickey Andrews. Similar to the path of former LU head coach, Vaughn Mancha, Andrews starred in football and baseball at the University of Alabama from 1961 to 1964 before being hired at the university in 1967. Andrews spent three seasons guiding the UWA football team, leading the Tigers to a 24–7–2 record during his tenure. The team also won their first and only championship in school history during the 1971 season defeating Arkansas Tech. LU's bid for a second consecutive NAIA National Championship came up short to Carson-Newman in the 1972 NAIA semi-final. Both teams battled to a 7–7 tie. However, a controversial tiebreaker ruling went in favor of Carson-Newman. In 1973, Andrews became the second LU head coach to resign and accept the defensive coordinator position at Florida State. With the next coach, once again, LU made a decision to hire a coach from within the program as they selected Andrews’ top assistant, Jim King. King, a native of Adamsville, Alabama, came to LU in 1970. In 1975, he led the Tigers to the NCAA playoffs with a 10–3 record. In the NCAA Quarter Finals, the team faced a tough task of taking on #1 ranked North Dakota. The game was nearly cancelled due to heavy snow. Nevertheless, LU prevailed in a huge upset to move on. During the Semi-Finals, they faced a tough Northern Michigan team on national television. Although LU jumped out to a 10–0 lead, they eventually fell short 28–26. King, like several successful LU coaches before him, moved on to a new opportunity elsewhere. In only three seasons, he compiled a 29–14–1 record. Since that time, the Tigers have faced their share of good but mostly bad seasons.

The hiring of Bobby Wallace in 2006 marked a new era within the football program. Wallace’s first head coaching stint came in the GSC when he was the head coach at the University of North Alabama from 1988 to 1997. During his time at UNA, he led the Lions to three consecutive national championships from 1993 to 1995 as his squads finished with an overall record of 41–1 during the course of those three seasons. The 1995 team was selected as the "Best Team of the Quarter Century" in Division II. Wallace also led UNA to Gulf South Conference Championships during the 1993–95 seasons, while his Lions also qualified for the NCAA Division II Playoffs six times during his tenure. Over his 10 seasons at the helm, he compiled an overall mark of 82–36–1, and he also produced a total of 12 NFL players. Prior to arriving in Livingston, he had served as the head coach at Temple University since 1997. Upon hiring Wallace, many around UWA hoped he could lead the football team back to its glory days. The Wallace Era began with a great glimmer of hope as UWA recorded its first winning season in 14 years. The Tigers finished 6–5 on the season. UWA also ended several streaks picking up wins at Lambuth, against Southern Arkansas, and at Arkansas-Monticello. The excitement was put on hold, however, as the team finished the 2007 season with a 1–9 record and posted a 4–7 record in 2008. Wallace and his team put together a memorable season in 2009. The season began with three consecutive victories including a televised home win over Arkansas Tech. Unfortunately, three consecutive losses followed. A couple of wins over #22 Delta State and Arkansas-Monticello put UWA right back in the thick of the playoff race, but a loss to West Georgia the following week nearly derailed their hopes. During the season finale, UWA was locked in a battle for their playoff lives against longtime rival and Wallace’s former team, North Alabama. At the time, UNA was ranked #1 in all the Division II polls. Through a fearless and courageous effort, UWA sent the game to overtime after losing the lead they held throughout the game. After four overtimes, it appeared UNA was set to claim the victory until a forced fumble gave UWA the ball. From that, they took advantage and kicked the game-winning field goal. It was the first win for the Tigers at Braly Municipal Stadium in Florence since the 1987 season.

The NCAA rewarded UWA's efforts with a berth in the NCAA Division II playoffs. In the first round, the Tigers upset #20 Albany State 24–22 on the road. After falling behind early against #10 Carson-Newman, the Tigers mounted a rally before falling short 59–41. The Tigers gathered an 8–5 record, the most wins since 1975, and had eight All-GSC honors. UWA posted a 5–1 record at Tiger Stadium, the best since 1985, and tallied the most wins over GSC opponents since 1981 with six. They received their first two rankings in school history at the end of the season. The AFCA placed them #21, while the D2Football.com poll placed them higher two spots at #19.

UWA entered the 2010 season ranked 12th nationally by USA Today. The team was also ranked 23rd in the Lindy’s Preseason Top 25 poll and 24th in the Sporting News Preseason Top 25 poll. The UWA football team recorded its highest pre-season ranking since 1976 as the Tigers were selected second by the head coaches of the 2010 Gulf South Conference in the GSC Pre-Season Poll. The Red and White previously entered as the top ranked team in 1976 and 1972. West Alabama opened the season on August 28 against NAIA member Shorter in nearby Demopolis, Alabama. Tiger Stadium saw a major renovation as a synthetic surface was recently installed. The Tigers played their first contest on the new surface on September 18 against Lambuth but were narrowly defeated. UWA opened Gulf South Conference play with a home win over West Georgia but fell short to Delta State on the road. After a 3–2 start, the Tigers reeled off three consecutive wins including a last-second Homecoming triumph over Henderson State. It appeared the game had ended, but officials put a second back on the clock. Quarterback Deon Williams connected to wide receiver Gerald Worsham in the back of the endzone for the game-winner. The team dropped back-to-back heartbreakers the following two weeks before returning home to face Valdosta State in the season finale. The day before the contest, Bobby Wallace announced to his players that he would be stepping down as head coach upon the end of the season. After falling behind and trailing at the half, the Tigers upset the #7 ranked Blazers to give Wallace a victory in his final game. The team notched its second win ever against Valdosta State and picked up their first win in the series since 1985. UWA finished the season 7–4 to earn consecutive winning seasons for the first time since 1991 and 1992. Deon Williams was recognized as one of 24 candidates for the Harlon Hill Trophy, the Division II equivalent to Division I's Heisman Trophy. Offensive coordinator Will Hall was named Bobby Wallace's successor a week after the season concluded. Bobby Wallace was inducted into the Division II Hall of Fame in December to close out a storied career. The 2011 team went 8–4, beat DI foe Georgia State, and qualified for the NCAA DII tournament. The 2012 team went undefeated in Gulf South play (5–0) to claim the conference title. UWA defeated Miles College 41–7 in round one of the playoffs. The team lost at eventual national champion Valdosta State 49–21 in the second round. UWA finished 9–4.

The 2013 team finished with an 8–3 (5–1)overall record. The Tigers claimed back to back GSC titles for the first time in history with a 5–1 GSC record. In that year they beat 4 rank team, including Delta state and #1 rank team Valdosta in consecutive weeks. Coach Hall resigned to become the coach of West Georgia. Brett Gilliland then took his place as head coach of the Tigers. In his first year, he would go 5–6 and have five all GSC players. In June 2024, Gilliland was named interim athletic director at West Alabama after the retirement of Kent Partridge, while remaining on the sidelines as the Tigers' head coach. West Alabama eventually removed the interim tag from Gilliland, after which he resigned as head football coach.

On February 3, 2025, former Alabama and Georgia strength and conditioning coach Scott Cochran was named head coach of the Tigers.

== Championships ==
=== National championships ===
Year	Association	Division	Head coach	Record	Opponent	Result
1971	NAIA (1)	Division I (1)	Mickey Andrews	11–1 (5–1 GSC)	Arkansas Tech	L, 14–12

== Postseason appearances ==
=== NCAA Division II ===
West Alabama have made seven appearances in the NCAA Division II playoffs, with a combined record of 4–7.

Year	Round	Opponent	Result
1975	First Round; Semifinals	North Dakota; Northern Michigan	W, 34–14; L, 26–28
2009	First Round; Second Round	Albany State; Carson–Newman	W, 24–22; L, 41–59
2011	First Round	North Alabama	L, 27–43
2012	First Round; Second Round	Miles; Valdosta State	W, 41–7; L, 21–49
2017	Second Round; Quarterfinals	Delta State; West Florida	W, 27–20; L, 21–28
2018	First Round	Bowie State	L, 35–41
2024	First Round	Lenoir–Rhyne	L, 34–37

=== NAIA ===
West Alabama, then known as Livingston, made two appearances in the NAIA playoffs, with a combined record of 2–1.

Year	Round	Opponent	Result
1971	Semifinals; National Championship	West Liberty State; Arkansas Tech	W, 25–2; W, 14–12
1972	Semifinals	Carson–Newman	L, 7–7

== Notable former players ==
Notable alumni include:

- Dontavius Blair: Offensive Lineman, Toronto Argonauts 2019–present
- Malcolm Butler: Cornerback, New England Patriots 2014–2017, Tennessee Titans 2018–2020
- Kennedy Estelle: Offensive Lineman, Saskatchewan Roughriders 2016, Montreal Alouettes 2019
- Otha Foster: Safety, Kansas City Chiefs 2013, Toronto Argonauts 2014, Edmonton Eskimos 2014–2015, Saskatchewan Roughriders 2016, 2017, 2020–present, Baltimore Ravens 2017, BC Lions 2018
- Kevin Guy: Wide Receiver, Minnesota Fighting Pike 1996, New Jersey Red Dogs 1997–1999, Orlando Predators 1999
- Tyreek Hill: Wide Receiver, Kansas City Chiefs 2016–2022, Miami Dolphins 2022–2025,
- Ken Hutcherson: Linebacker, Dallas Cowboys 1974, San Diego Chargers 1975
- Deon Lacey: Linebacker, Dallas Cowboys 2013, Edmonton Eskimos 2014–present
- Charles Martin: Defensive End, Green Bay Packers 1984–87, Houston Oilers 1987, Atlanta Falcons 1988
- Seth Roberts: Wide Receiver, Oakland Raiders 2014–2018, Baltimore Ravens 2019, Carolina Panthers 2020–present
- Lawrence Samuels: Wide Receiver, Tampa Bay Storm 1994–2000, 2002–2010, New Jersey Red Dogs 2001
- Johnny Shepherd: Running Back, Buffalo Bills 1987
- Dee Virgin: Cornerback, Houston Texans 2017–2018, Detroit Lions 2018–present
- Matt Willis: Running Back, Cleveland Browns 2014
- Ridge Wilson: Defensive End/Linebacker, Kansas City Chiefs 2013–present
- Kendrick Office: Defensive End, Buffalo Bills 2001–2002
- Joshua Fatu: Professional Wrestler, Signed WWE
- Jonathan Fatu: Professional Wrestler, Signed WWE
- Ezekiel Ufomadu : College instructor

== Program achievements ==
Alabama Collegiate Conference Champions	1940, 1949
Gulf South Conference Champions	1971, 2012, 2013, 2017
NCAA Division II Team Playoff Participants	1975, 2009, 2011, 2012, 2017, 2018
NCAA Division II Regional Championships	1975
NCAA Division II National Championships	
NAIA Team Playoff Participants	1971, 1972
NAIA Regional Championships	1971, 1972
NAIA National Champions	1971
