= 1971 NAIA Division I football season =

American college football season

- Regular season: August–November 1971
- Postseason: November 26–December 11, 1971
- National Championship: Legion Field; Birmingham, AL
- Champions: Livingston

The 1971 NAIA Division I football season was the 16th season of college football sponsored by the NAIA and the second season of the league's two-division structure. The season was played from August to November 1971 and culminated in the 1971 NAIA Champion Bowl, played on December 11, 1971 at Legion Field in Birmingham, Alabama. Livingston defeated Arkansas Tech in the Champion Bowl, 14–12, to win their first NAIA national title.

== Conference standings ==
1971 Arkansas Intercollegiate Conference football standings
	Conf.					Overall
Team	W		L		T	W		L		T
No. 2 Arkansas Tech $^	6	–	0	–	0	12	–	1	–	0
Southern Arkansas	5	–	1	–	0	9	–	2	–	0
Ouachita Baptist	4	–	2	–	0	7	–	3	–	0
Harding	2	–	4	–	0	5	–	5	–	0
Arkansas–Monticello	2	–	4	–	0	3	–	7	–	0
Henderson State	1	–	4	–	1	4	–	4	–	1
State College of Arkansas	0	–	5	–	1	2	–	6	–	1
$ – Conference champion; ^ – NAIA Division I playoff participant; Rankings from NAIA Division I poll

1971 Carolinas Conference football standings
	Conf.					Overall
Team	W		L		T	W		L		T
Elon $	5	–	0	–	0	8	–	3	–	0
Newberry	3	–	1	–	1	8	–	2	–	1
Presbyterian	3	–	2	–	0	8	–	3	–	0
Catawba	2	–	3	–	0	5	–	6	–	0
Lenoir Rhyne	1	–	3	–	1	2	–	7	–	1
Guilford	0	–	5	–	0	0	–	10	–	0
$ – Conference champion

1971 Evergreen Conference football standings
	Conf.					Overall
Team	W		L		T	W		L		T
Western Washington $	6	–	0	–	0	7	–	3	–	0
Oregon College	4	–	2	–	0	8	–	2	–	0
Eastern Washington	3	–	2	–	0	5	–	5	–	0
Eastern Oregon	3	–	3	–	0	4	–	6	–	0
Central Washington	2	–	3	–	0	4	–	6	–	0
Southern Oregon	1	–	4	–	0	2	–	8	–	0
Oregon Tech	0	–	5	–	0	1	–	8	–	0
$ – Conference champion

1971 Gulf South Conference football standings
	Conf.					Overall
Team	W		L		T	W		L		T
No. 1 Livingston +^	5	–	1	–	0	11	–	1	–	0
Troy State +	5	–	1	–	0	6	–	3	–	0
Jacksonville State	3	–	2	–	0	6	–	3	–	0
Tennessee–Martin	3	–	3	–	0	5	–	5	–	0
Delta State	2	–	4	–	0	3	–	5	–	1
Florence State	0	–	6	–	0	1	–	10	–	0
Southeastern Louisiana	0	–	6	–	0	0	–	11	–	0
+ – Conference co-champions; ^ – NAIA Division I playoff participant; Rankings from NAIA Division I poll

1971 Lone Star Conference football standings
	Conf.					Overall
Team	W		L		T	W		L		T
No. 3 Howard Payne +	7	–	1	–	1	10	–	1	–	1
No. 4 Southwest Texas State +	7	–	1	–	1	8	–	1	–	1
No. 13 Texas A&I	7	–	2	–	0	7	–	3	–	0
Angelo State	6	–	3	–	0	7	–	3	–	0
East Texas State	5	–	4	–	0	6	–	5	–	0
Sul Ross	3	–	6	–	0	4	–	6	–	1
Sam Houston State	3	–	6	–	0	4	–	7	–	0
Tarleton State	2	–	7	–	0	3	–	7	–	0
McMurry	2	–	7	–	0	2	–	8	–	0
Stephen F. Austin	2	–	7	–	0	2	–	8	–	0
+ – Conference co-champions; Rankings from NAIA Division I poll

1971 Minnesota Intercollegiate Athletic Conference football standings
	Conf.					Overall
Team	W		L		T	W		L		T
No. 7 Saint John's (MN) +	6	–	1	–	0	8	–	1	–	0
Gustavus Adolphus +	6	–	1	–	0	6	–	4	–	0
Minnesota–Duluth	5	–	2	–	0	6	–	3	–	1
Concordia-Moorhead	4	–	3	–	0	7	–	3	–	0
Hamline	4	–	3	–	0	7	–	3	–	0
St. Thomas (MN)	2	–	5	–	0	3	–	7	–	0
Macalester	1	–	6	–	0	1	–	7	–	1
Augsburg	0	–	7	–	0	1	–	8	–	0
+ – Conference co-champions; Rankings from NAIA Division I poll

1971 Nebraska College Conference football standings
	Conf.					Overall
Team	W		L		T	W		L		T
Wayne State (NE) $	3	–	0	–	0	4	–	5	–	0
Kearney State	2	–	1	–	0	5	–	3	–	1
Chadron State	1	–	2	–	0	5	–	4	–	0
Peru State	0	–	3	–	0	1	–	9	–	0
$ – Conference champion

1971 Northern Intercollegiate Conference football standings
	Conf.					Overall
Team	W		L		T	W		L		T
Moorhead State $	6	–	0	–	0	7	–	1	–	1
Michigan Tech	5	–	1	–	0	8	–	1	–	0
Minnesota Morris	3	–	2	–	1	4	–	4	–	1
Bemidji State	3	–	2	–	1	3	–	5	–	1
St. Cloud State	2	–	4	–	0	2	–	7	–	0
Winona State	1	–	5	–	0	1	–	9	–	0
Southwest State (MN)	0	–	6	–	0	0	–	10	–	0
$ – Conference champion

1971 Oklahoma Collegiate Conference football standings
	Conf.					Overall
Team	W		L		T	W		L		T
No. 12 SW Oklahoma State $	7	–	1	–	0	8	–	2	–	0
Central State (OK)	5	–	2	–	1	7	–	2	–	1
Cameron	5	–	2	–	1	7	–	3	–	2
Northeastern State	5	–	3	–	0	7	–	4	–	0
NW Oklahoma State	5	–	3	–	0	7	–	4	–	0
East Central	3	–	5	–	0	3	–	7	–	0
Panhandle	2	–	6	–	0	5	–	6	–	0
Langston	2	–	6	–	0	2	–	9	–	0
SE Oklahoma State	1	–	7	–	0	1	–	10	–	0
$ – Conference champion; Rankings from NAIA Division I poll

1971 Rocky Mountain Athletic Conference football standings
	Conf.					Overall
Team	W		L		T	W		L		T
Mountain Division
Western State (CO) x	5	–	1	–	0	6	–	2	–	1
Adams State xy	5	–	1	–	0	5	–	5	–	0
Southern Utah	3	–	3	–	0	5	–	5	–	0
Western New Mexico	3	–	3	–	0	3	–	5	–	0
Colorado Mines	2	–	4	–	0	2	–	8	–	0
Westminster (UT)	2	–	4	–	0	4	–	4	–	0
Fort Lewis	1	–	5	–	0	2	–	7	–	0
Plains Division
Northern Colorado xy$	5	–	0	–	0	8	–	1	–	1
Pittsburg State	3	–	1	–	1	8	–	1	–	1
Nebraska–Omaha	2	–	2	–	1	5	–	4	–	1
Emporia State	1	–	3	–	1	3	–	6	–	1
Fort Hays State	1	–	3	–	1	2	–	7	–	1
Southern Colorado	1	–	4	–	0	4	–	6	–	0
Washburn *	0	–	0	–	0	5	–	5	–	0
Championship: Northern Colorado 25, Adam State 15
$ – Conference champion; x – Division champion/co-champions; y – Championship game participant; * – Washburn was ineligible for conference title

1971 South Dakota Intercollegiate Conference football standings
	Conf.					Overall
Team	W		L		T	W		L		T
No. 8 Northern State $^	5	–	0	–	0	8	–	1	–	1
No. 12 Dakota State	4	–	2	–	0	9	–	2	–	0
South Dakota Tech	3	–	2	–	1	3	–	4	–	1
South Dakota–Springfield	3	–	3	–	0	4	–	5	–	0
Huron	2	–	2	–	2	3	–	4	–	2
Black Hills State	1	–	3	–	1	2	–	6	–	1
Dakota Wesleyan	0	–	6	–	0	2	–	7	–	0
$ – Conference champion; ^ – NAIA Division I playoff participant; Rankings from NAIA Division I poll for Northern State and NAIA Division II poll for Dakota State

1971 Southwestern Athletic Conference football standings
	Conf.					Overall
Team	W		L		T	W		L		T
No. 9 Grambling $	5	–	1	–	0	9	–	2	–	0
Jackson State	4	–	1	–	1	9	–	1	–	1
No. 16 Alcorn A&M	4	–	2	–	0	6	–	3	–	0
Texas Southern	3	–	2	–	1	7	–	2	–	1
Prairie View A&M	2	–	4	–	0	3	–	7	–	0
Mississippi Valley State	1	–	5	–	0	4	–	7	–	0
Southern	1	–	5	–	0	3	–	7	–	0
$ – Conference champion; Rankings from NAIA Division I poll for Grambling and UPI small college poll for Alcorn A&M

1971 West Virginia Intercollegiate Athletic Conference football standings
	Conf.					Overall
Team	W		L		T	W		L		T
No. 5 West Liberty State $^	7	–	1	–	0	8	–	2	–	0
Fairmont State	5	–	1	–	0	7	–	3	–	0
Salem	6	–	2	–	1	7	–	2	–	1
Bluefield State	4	–	1	–	1	4	–	3	–	1
Shepherd	3	–	1	–	2	7	–	1	–	2
Glenville State	4	–	3	–	1	4	–	5	–	0
West Virginia State	2	–	5	–	0	2	–	8	–	0
West Virginia Tech	1	–	5	–	1	2	–	6	–	1
West Virginia Wesleyan	1	–	6	–	0	2	–	7	–	0
Concord	0	–	8	–	0	0	–	9	–	0
$ – Conference champion; ^ – NAIA Division I playoff participant Conference standings based on power ratings; Rankings from NAIA Division I poll

1971 Wisconsin State University Conference football standings
	Conf.					Overall
Team	W		L		T	W		L		T
No. 11 Wisconsin–Platteville +	7	–	1	–	0	9	–	1	–	0
No. 14 Wisconsin–La Crosse +	7	–	1	–	0	8	–	2	–	0
Wisconsin–Superior	6	–	2	–	0	6	–	4	–	0
Wisconsin–Eau Claire	4	–	4	–	0	6	–	4	–	0
Wisconsin–Oshkosh	4	–	4	–	0	4	–	6	–	0
Wisconsin–Stout	3	–	5	–	0	5	–	5	–	0
Wisconsin–River Falls	2	–	6	–	0	3	–	7	–	0
Wisconsin–Whitewater	2	–	6	–	0	3	–	7	–	0
Wisconsin–Stevens Point	1	–	7	–	0	1	–	9	–	0
+ – Conference co-champions; Wisconsin–Whitewater forfeited five games.; Rankings from NAIA Division I poll

1971 NAIA Division I independents football records
	Conf.			Overall
Team	W	L	T	W		L		T
No. 6 Carson–Newman		–		10	–	2	–	0
Kentucky State		–		8	–	2	–	0
Wofford		–		6	–	4	–	0
Hillsdale		–		6	–	5	–	0
Eastern New Mexico		–		4	–	5	–	1
New Mexico Highlands		–		1	–	8	–	1
Rankings from NAIA Division I poll

== Postseason ==
Semifinals; November 26–27, 1971
Northern State (SD)	0
Arkansas Tech*	24
Livingston	25
West Liberty State*	2

1971 Champion Bowl; December 11, 1971; Birmingham, AL
Arkansas Tech	12
Livingston*	14

== See also ==
- 1971 NAIA Division II football season
- 1971 NCAA University Division football season
- 1971 NCAA College Division football season
