= North Alabama–West Alabama football rivalry =

American college football rivalry

The North Alabama–West Alabama Rivalry
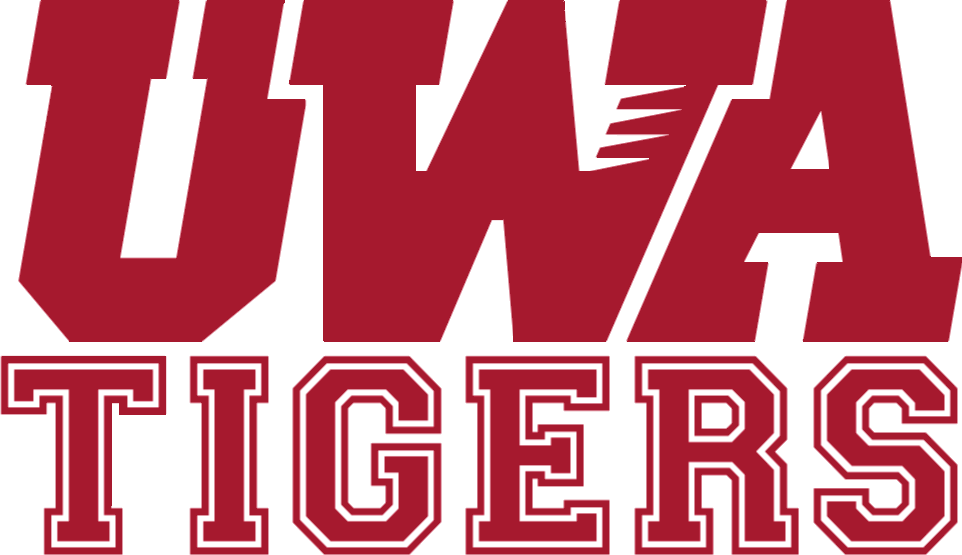
- North Alabama West Alabama
- Sport: Football
- First meeting: 1949; West Alabama 14, North Alabama 13
- Latest meeting: September 23, 2017; West Alabama 38, North Alabama 17

Statistics
- Total meetings: 71
- All-time series: North Alabama leads 52–18–1
- Largest victory: North Alabama, 62 (2005)
- Longest win streak: North Alabama, 14 (1988–2001)
- Current win streak: West Alabama, 1 (2017–present)

Locations in Alabama

The North Alabama–West Alabama football rivalry is a college football rivalry game between two public universities in the U.S. state of Alabama, the University of North Alabama Lions and the University of West Alabama Tigers. The current winner is West Alabama, who won 38–17, on September 23, 2017. North Alabama leads the all-time series, 52–18–1.

The 71 previous meetings mark the most games each team has played against another school and the 52 wins for North Alabama are also its most against an opposing institution.

== History ==
North Alabama and West Alabama first met in 1949 and played every year up to and including 2017. West Alabama was the only program that North Alabama had faced every season since the Lions restored their football program in 1949, after a 21-year-long hiatus since 1928, and until the rivalry was put on hiatus after the 2017 season.

=== Gulf South Conference: 1970–2017 ===
North Alabama and West Alabama have been in the same conference since 1970, and were both founding members of the Mid-South Conference in 1970 and their current conference, Gulf South Conference a year later. The Lions and Tigers have played ever since 1970 for 49 match-ups. In fact, the Lions and Tigers even played twice in the regular season in 1986. In 2011, the Lions and Tigers met in the regular season and post-season.

West Alabama upset North Alabama in both 2002 and 2004 in Livingston, and in 2009 in four overtimes in Florence when the Lions were ranked No. 1 in the nation. That was West Alabama's first win in Florence since 1987. The Tigers were led in that game by former North Alabama head coach Bobby Wallace.

Bobby Wallace has coached at both schools, coaching at North Alabama from 1988 to 1997, West Alabama from 2006 to 2010 and returning to the Lions from 2012 to 2016.

The 2017 season was the last for the rivalry for the foreseeable future, following UNA's announcement that it would upgrade its athletic program to NCAA Division I, joining the ASUN Conference for non-football sports in 2018 and eventually the Big South Conference in football.

== Game results ==
North Alabama victories	West Alabama victories	Tie games

No.	Date	Location	Winner	Score
1	1949	Florence	West Alabama	14–13
2	1950	Livingston	West Alabama	19–0
3	1951	Florence	North Alabama	12–9
4	1952	Livingston	North Alabama	34–6
5	1953	Florence	North Alabama	40–6
6	1954	Livingston	North Alabama	32–0
7	1955	Florence	North Alabama	52–0
8	1956	Livingston	North Alabama	32–6
9	1957	Florence	North Alabama	47–7
10	1958	Florence	North Alabama	32–14
11	1959	Florence	North Alabama	19–0
12	1960	Florence	North Alabama	23–6
13	1961	Florence	North Alabama	49–0
14	1962	Livingston	North Alabama	27–7
15	1963	Florence	North Alabama	35–7
16	1964	Livingston	Tie	6–6
17	1965	Florence	North Alabama	42–28
18	1966	Livingston	North Alabama	10–0
19	1967	Florence	North Alabama	28–7
20	1968	Livingston	West Alabama	27–23
21	1969	Florence	North Alabama	17–13
22	1970	Livingston	North Alabama	21–14
23	1971	Florence	West Alabama	31–0
24	1972	Livingston	West Alabama	17–6
25	1973	Florence	North Alabama	13–12
26	1974	Livingston	West Alabama	28–16
27	1975	Florence	West Alabama	14–7
28	1976	Livingston	West Alabama	27–24
29	1977	Florence	North Alabama	42–9
30	1978	Livingston	North Alabama	19–7
31	1979	Florence	North Alabama	6–0
32	1980	Livingston	North Alabama	20–3
33	1981	Florence	West Alabama	19–9
34	1982	Livingston	West Alabama	14–3
35	1983	Florence	North Alabama	15–12
36	1984	Livingston	West Alabama	35–28

No.	Date	Location	Winner	Score
37	1985	Florence	North Alabama	17–0
38	1986	Hamilton	North Alabama	14–3
39	1986	Livingston	North Alabama	21–17
40	1987	Florence	West Alabama	12–10
41	1988	Livingston	North Alabama	10–7
42	1989	Florence	North Alabama	30–0
43	1990	Livingston	North Alabama	54–10
44	1991	Florence	North Alabama	14–0
45	1992	Livingston	North Alabama	20–13
46	1993	Florence	North Alabama	65–13
47	1994	Livingston	North Alabama	50–7
48	1995	Florence	North Alabama	42–10
49	1996	Livingston	North Alabama	38–24
50	1997	Florence	North Alabama	56–14
51	1998	Florence	North Alabama	38–24
52	1999	Livingston	North Alabama	51–33
53	2000	Florence	North Alabama	21–14
54	2001	Florence	North Alabama	30–0
55	2002	Livingston	West Alabama	31–24
56	2003	Florence	North Alabama	44–10
57	2004	Livingston	West Alabama	28–27
58	2005	Florence	North Alabama	76–14
59	2006	Livingston	North Alabama	45–3
60	2007	Florence	North Alabama	49–20
61	2008	Livingston	North Alabama	41–9
62	2009	Florence	West Alabama	31–28
63	2010	Florence	North Alabama	24–23
64	2011	Livingston	West Alabama	31–26
65	2011	Livingston	North Alabama	43–27
66	2012	Livingston	West Alabama	42–27
67	2013	Florence	North Alabama	30–27
68	2014	Livingston	North Alabama	24–16
69	2015	Florence	North Alabama	52–14
70	2016	Livingston	North Alabama	45–7
71	2017	Florence	West Alabama	38–17
Series: North Alabama leads 52–18–1

== See also ==
- List of NCAA college football rivalry games
