= List of Nicholls Colonels football seasons =

This is a list of seasons completed by the Nicholls Colonels football team of the National Collegiate Athletic Association (NCAA) Division I Football Championship Subdivision (FCS), representing Nicholls State University in the Southland Conference. Nicholls plays their home games at Manning Field at John L. Guidry Stadium in Thibodaux, Louisiana. Nicholls' first fielded a football team in 1972.

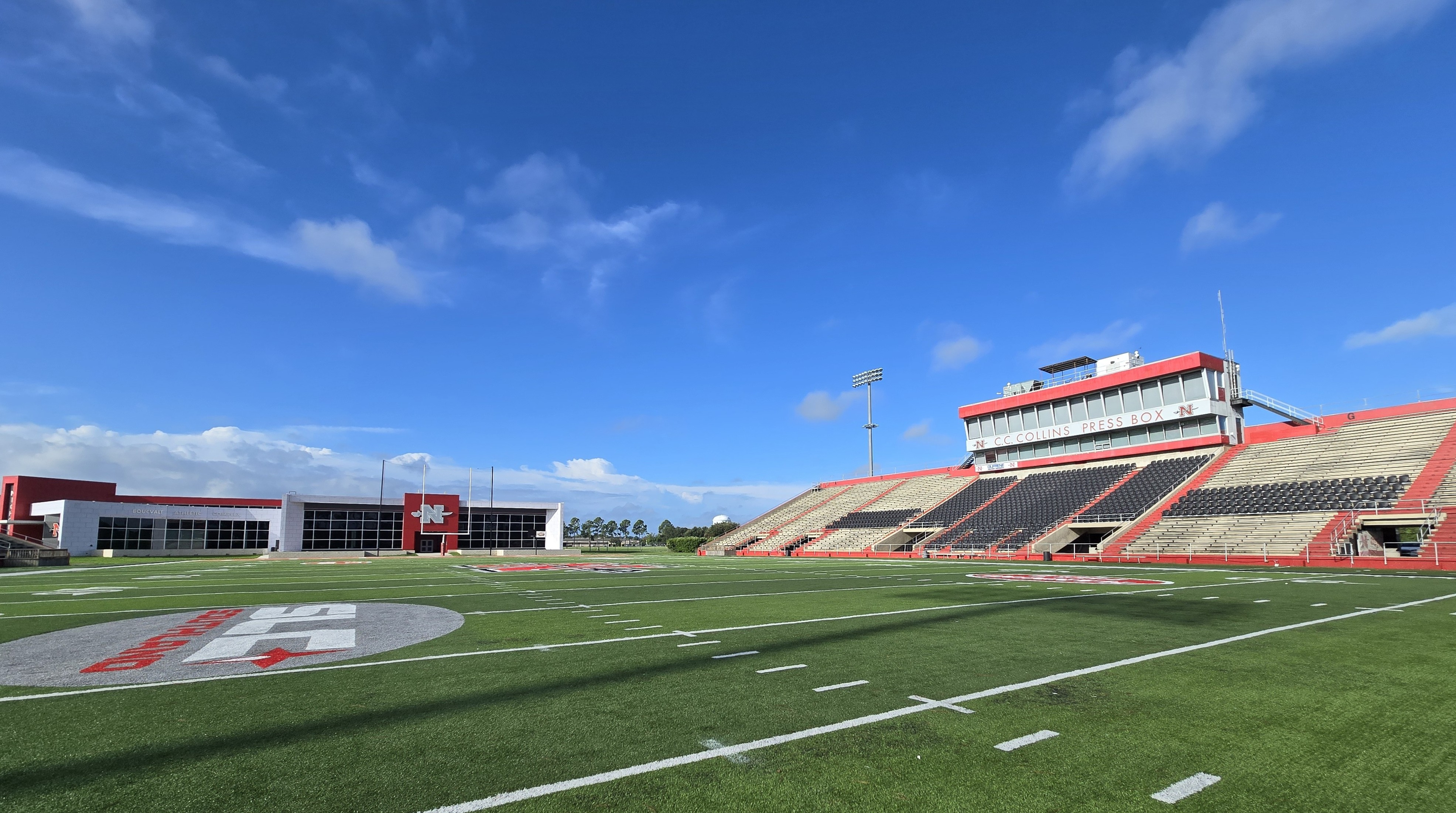
Manning Field at John L. Guidry Stadium, Nicholls' home since 1972

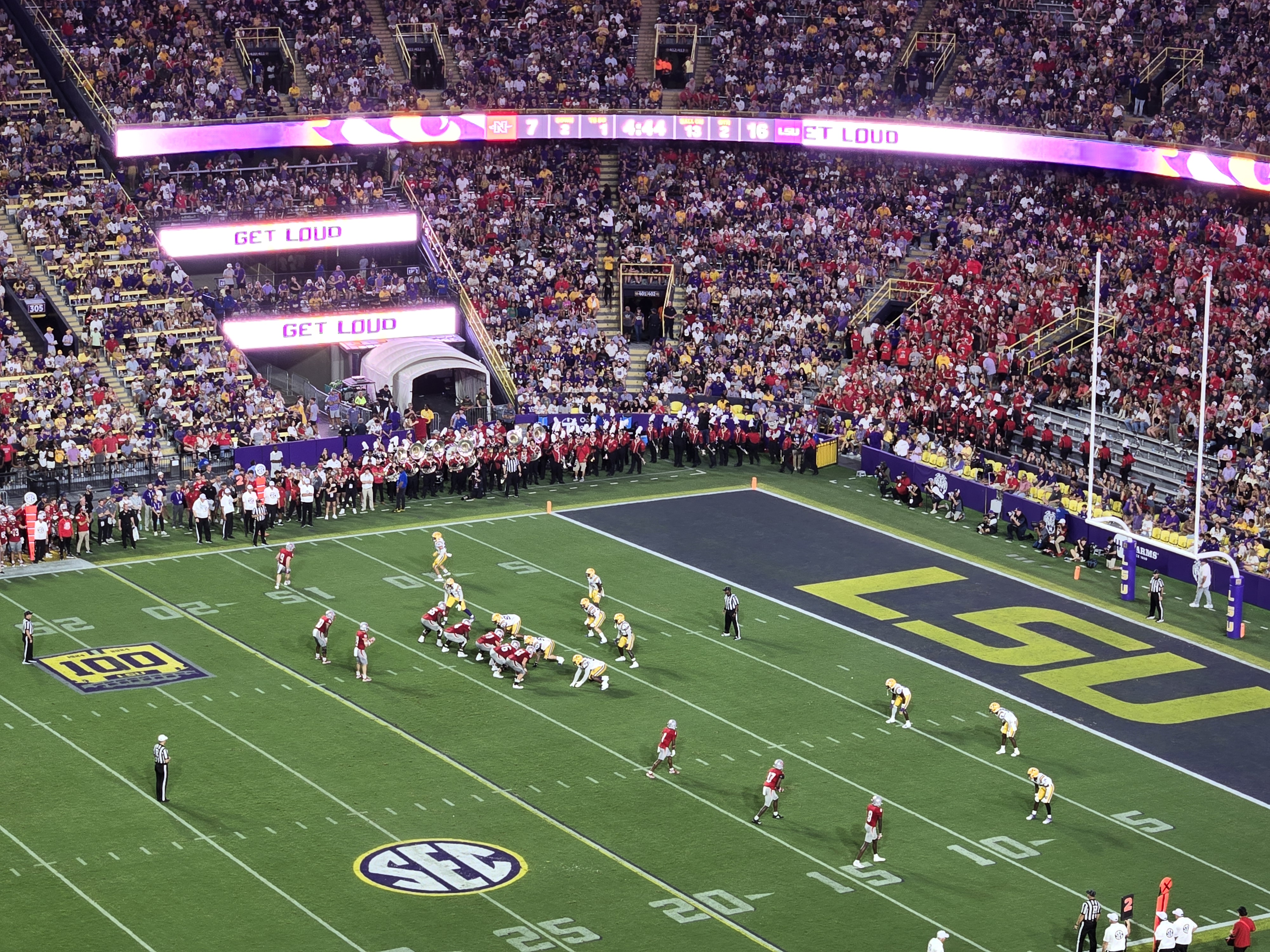
Nicholls Colonels vs. LSU Tigers at Tiger Stadium

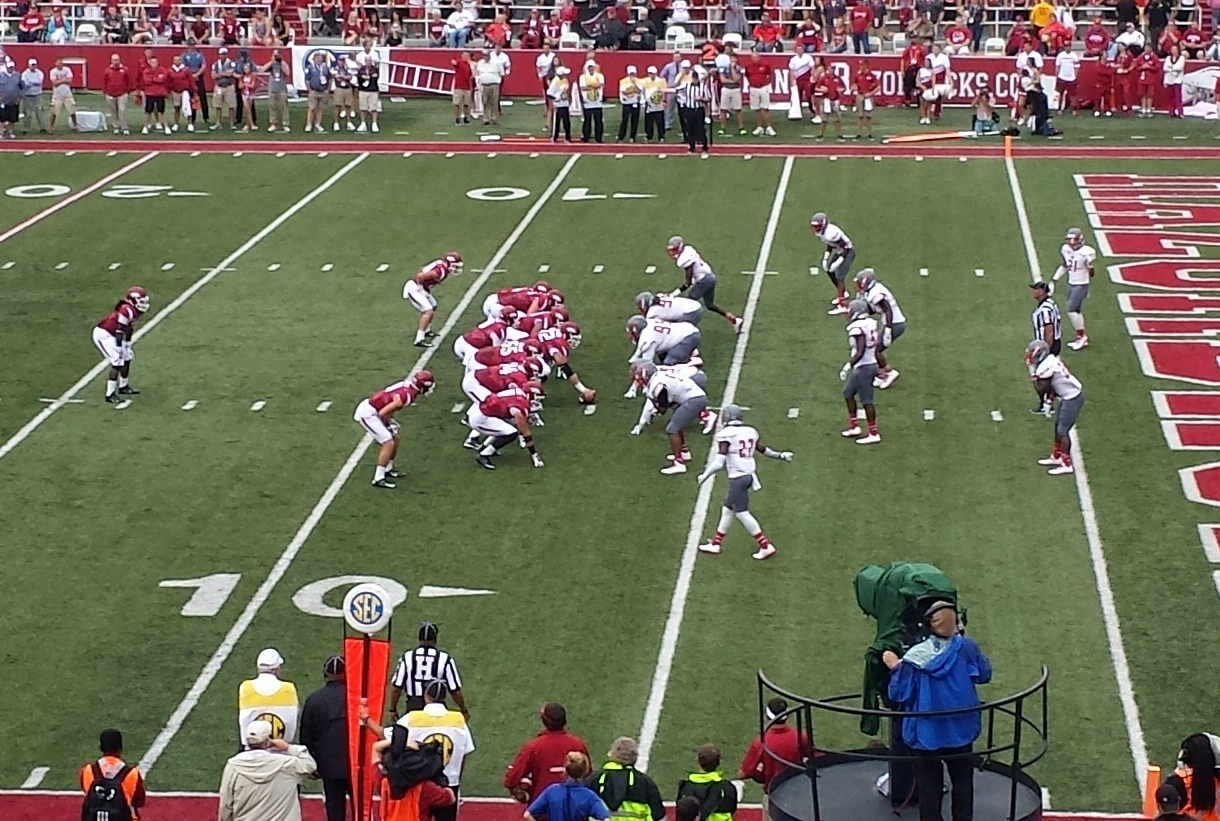
Nicholls Colonels vs. Arkansas Razorbacks

== Seasons ==
Statistics correct as of the end of the 2024 Season

NCAA Division I FCS champions †	Conference champions *	Division champions ‡	Playoff Appearance ^	Undefeated Season #

Year	NCAA Division	Conference	Conference Division	Overall				Conference					Coach	Final Ranking
Year	NCAA Division	Conference	Conference Division	Win	Loss	Tie	Pct.	Win	Loss	Tie	Pct.	Standing	Coach	Final Ranking
1972	NCAA College Division	Gulf South	N/A	3	8	0	.273	1	5	0	.167	N/A	Gary Kinchen	-
1973	II	Gulf South	N/A	2	9	0	.182	2	7	0	.222	N/A	Gary Kinchen	-
1974	II	Gulf South	N/A	5	6	0	.455	4	5	0	.444	N/A	Bill Clements	-
1975*	II	Gulf South*	N/A	8	2	0	.800	7	2	0	.778	1st*	Bill Clements	-
1976	II	Gulf South	N/A	4	6	1	.409	2	6	1	.278	N/A	Bill Clements	-
1977	II	Gulf South	N/A	4	7	0	.364	2	5	0	.286	N/A	Bill Clements	-
1978	II	Gulf South	N/A	5	6	0	.455	4	2	0	.667	N/A	Bill Clements	-
1979	II	Division II Independent	N/A	8	3	0	.727	0	0	0	.000	N/A	Bill Clements	-
1980	I-AA	Division I-AA Independent	N/A	2	9	0	.182	0	0	0	.000	N/A	Bill Clements	-
1981	I-AA	Division I-AA Independent	N/A	5	5	1	.500	0	0	0	.000	N/A	Sonny Jackson	-
1982	I-AA	Division I-AA Independent	N/A	7	4	0	.636	0	0	0	.000	N/A	Sonny Jackson	-
1983	I-AA	Division I-AA Independent	N/A	5	6	0	.455	0	0	0	.000	N/A	Sonny Jackson	-
1984*	I-AA	Gulf Star*	N/A	6	5	0	.545	4	1	0	.800	T–1st*	Sonny Jackson	-
1985	I-AA	Gulf Star	N/A	6	5	0	.545	2	3	0	.400	N/A	Sonny Jackson	-
1986	I-AA^	Gulf Star	N/A	10	3	0	.769	2	2	0	.500	N/A	Sonny Jackson	12
1987	I-AA	Division I-AA Independent	N/A	5	5	1	.500	0	0	0	.000	N/A	Phil Greco	-
1988	I-AA	Division I-AA Independent	N/A	7	4	0	.636	0	0	0	.000	N/A	Phil Greco	-
1989	I-AA	Division I-AA Independent	N/A	5	6	0	.455	0	0	0	.000	N/A	Phil Greco	-
1990	I-AA	Division I-AA Independent	N/A	5	6	0	.455	0	0	0	.000	N/A	Phil Greco	-
1991	I-AA	Southland	N/A	4	7	0	.364	2	5	0	.286	6th	Phil Greco	-
1992	I-AA	Southland	N/A	1	9	1	.136	0	6	1	.071	8th	Phil Greco	-
1993	I-AA	Southland	N/A	3	8	0	.273	2	5	0	.286	7th	Rick Rhoades	-
1994	I-AA	Southland	N/A	5	6	0	.455	1	5	0	.167	6th	Rick Rhoades	-
1995	I-AA	Southland	N/A	0	11	0	.000	0	5	0	.000	6th	Darren Barbier	-
1996	I-AA^	Southland	N/A	8	4	0	.667	4	2	0	.667	2nd	Darren Barbier	12
1997	I-AA	Southland	N/A	5	6	0	.455	3	4	0	.429	5th	Darren Barbier	-
1998	I-AA	Southland	N/A	4	7	0	.364	3	4	0	.429	5th	Darren Barbier	-
1999	I-AA	Southland	N/A	1	10	0	.091	1	6	0	.143	8th	Daryl Daye	-
2000	I-AA	Southland	N/A	2	9	0	.182	1	6	0	.143	8th	Daryl Daye	-
2001	I-AA	Southland	N/A	3	8	0	.273	1	6	0	.143	6th	Daryl Daye	-
2002	I-AA	Southland	N/A	7	4	0	.636	3	3	0	.500	3rd	Daryl Daye	23
2003	I-AA	Southland	N/A	0	11	0	.000	0	5	0	.000	6th	Daryl Daye	-
2004	I-AA	Southland	N/A	5	5	0	.500	2	3	0	.400	4th	Jay Thomas	-
2005*	I-AA^	Southland*	N/A	6	4	0	.600	5	1	0	.833	1st*	Jay Thomas	17
2006	FCS	Southland	N/A	4	7	0	.364	2	4	0	.333	5th	Jay Thomas	-
2007	FCS	Southland	N/A	6	5	0	.545	3	4	0	.429	4th	Jay Thomas	-
2008	FCS	Southland	N/A	3	6	0	.333	3	4	0	.429	5th	Jay Thomas	-
2009	FCS	Southland	N/A	3	8	0	.273	2	5	0	.286	7th	Jay Thomas	-
2010	FCS	Southland	N/A	4	7	0	.364	3	4	0	.429	6th	Charlie Stubbs	-
2011	FCS	Southland	N/A	1	10	0	.091	0	7	0	.000	8th	Charlie Stubbs	-
2012	FCS	Southland	N/A	1	10	0	.091	0	7	0	.000	8th	Charlie Stubbs	-
2013	FCS	Southland	N/A	4	8	0	.333	1	6	0	.143	7th	Charlie Stubbs	-
2014	FCS	Southland	N/A	0	12	0	.000	0	8	0	.000	11th	Charlie Stubbs; Steve Axman	-
2015	FCS	Southland	N/A	3	8	0	.273	3	6	0	.333	8th	Tim Rebowe	-
2016	FCS	Southland	N/A	5	6	0	.455	5	4	0	.556	5th	Tim Rebowe	-
2017	FCS^	Southland	N/A	8	4	0	.667	7	2	0	.778	3rd	Tim Rebowe	-
2018*	FCS^	Southland*	N/A	9	4	0	.692	7	2	0	.778	T-1st*	Tim Rebowe	14
2019*	FCS^	Southland*	N/A	9	5	0	.643	7	2	0	.778	T-1st*	Tim Rebowe	14
2020	FCS	Southland	N/A	4	3	0	.571	3	3	0	.500	3rd	Tim Rebowe	23
2021	FCS	Southland	N/A	6	5	0	.545	5	3	0	.625	3rd	Tim Rebowe	-
2022	FCS	Southland	N/A	3	8	0	.273	3	3	0	.500	4th	Tim Rebowe	-
2023*	FCS^	Southland*	N/A	6	5	0	.545	7	0	0	1.000	1st*	Tim Rebowe	-
2024	FCS	Southland	N/A	4	8	0	.333	2	5	0	.286	8th	Tim Rebowe	-
2025	FCS	Southland	N/A	4	8	0	.333	4	4	0	.500	T–5th	Tommy Rybacki	-
	Totals			243	351	4	.410	125	187	2	.401			
