= List of Nicholls Colonels head football coaches =

The Nicholls Colonels college football team represents Nicholls State University in the Southland Conference. The Colonels compete as part of the National Collegiate Athletic Association (NCAA) Division I Football Championship (FCS). The program has had 11 head coaches since it began play during the 1972 season. Since December 2024, Tommy Rybacki has served as Nicholls' head coach. Bill Clements is the leader in seasons coached with seven, and Sonny Jackson is both the leader in games won with 39 and winning percentage with .581. Charlie Stubbs has the lowest winning percentage of those who have coached more than one game, with .208.

== Key ==
Key to symbols in coaches list
| General | | Overall | | Conference | | Postseason (Note: Although the first Rose Bowl Game was played in 1902, it has been continuously played since the 1916 game, and is recognized as the oldest bowl game by the NCAA. "—" indicates any season prior to 1916 when postseason games were not played.) | |
|---|---|---|---|---|---|---|---|
| No. | Order of coaches (Note: A running total of the number of head coaches, with coaches who served separate tenures being counted only once. Interim head coaches are represented with "Int" and are not counted in the running total. "—" indicates the team played but either without a coach or no coach is on record. "X" indicates an interim year without play.) | GC | Games coached | CW | Conference wins | PW | Postseason wins |
| DC | Division championships | OW | Overall wins | CL | Conference losses | PL | Postseason losses |
| CC | Conference championships | OL | Overall losses | CT | Conference ties | PT | Postseason ties |
| NC | National championships | OT | Overall ties (Note: Overtime rules in college football were introduced in 1996, making ties impossible in the period since.) | C% | Conference winning percentage | | |
| † | Elected to the College Football Hall of Fame | O% | Overall winning percentage (Note: When computing the win–loss percentage, a tie counts as half a win and half a loss.) | | | | |

== Coaches ==
List of head football coaches showing season(s) coached, overall records, conference records, postseason records, championships and selected awards (Note: Statistics correct as of the end of the 2025 college football season.)
| No. | Name | Term | G | W | L | T | PCT | CW | CL | CT | PCT | PW | PL | PT | CCs | NCs | Awards |
|---|---|---|---|---|---|---|---|---|---|---|---|---|---|---|---|---|---|
| 1 | Gary Kinchen | 1972–1973 | 22 | 5 | 17 | 0 | 0.227 | 3 | 12 | 0 | 0.200 | 0 | 0 | 0 | 0 | 0 | — |
| 2 | Bill Clements | 1974–1980 | 76 | 36 | 39 | 1 | 0.480 | 19 | 20 | 1 | 0.488 | 0 | 0 | 0 | 1 | 0 | — |
| 3 | Sonny Jackson | 1981–1986 | 68 | 39 | 28 | 1 | 0.581 | 8 | 6 | 0 | 0.571 | 1 | 1 | 0 | 1 | 0 | — |
| 4 | Phil Greco | 1987–1992 | 66 | 27 | 37 | 2 | 0.424 | 2 | 11 | 1 | 0.179 | 0 | 0 | 0 | 0 | 0 | — |
| 5 | Rick Rhoades | 1993–1994 | 22 | 8 | 14 | 0 | 0.364 | 3 | 10 | 0 | 0.231 | 0 | 0 | 0 | 0 | 0 | — |
| 6 | Darren Barbier | 1995–1998 | 45 | 17 | 28 | 0 | 0.378 | 10 | 15 | 0 | 0.400 | 0 | 1 | 0 | 0 | 0 | Eddie Robinson Award (1996); Southland Conference Coach of the Year (1996) |
| 7 | Daryl Daye | 1999–2003 | 55 | 13 | 42 | — | 0.236 | 6 | 26 | — | 0.188 | 0 | 0 | — | 0 | 0 | — |
| 8 | Jay Thomas | 2004–2009 | 62 | 27 | 35 | — | 0.435 | 17 | 21 | — | 0.447 | 0 | 1 | — | 1 | 0 | — |
| 9 | Charlie Stubbs | 2010–2014 | 48 | 10 | 38 | — | 0.208 | 4 | 24 | — | 0.143 | 0 | 0 | — | 0 | 0 | — |
| Int | Steve Axman (Note: Steve Axman was named interim head coach for the final nine games of the 2014 season, following health issues with Charlie Stubbs.) | 2014 | 9 | 0 | 9 | — | .000 | 0 | 8 | — | .000 | 0 | 0 | — | 0 | 0 | — |
| 10 | Tim Rebowe | 2015–2024 | 113 | 57 | 56 | — | 0.504 | 49 | 30 | — | 0.620 | 2 | 4 | — | 2 | 0 | — |
| 11 | Tommy Rybacki | 2025–present | 12 | 4 | 8 | — | 0.333 | 4 | 4 | — | 0.500 | 0 | 0 | — | 0 | 0 | — |
