= C. O. Brocato =

American football player and scout (1929–2015)

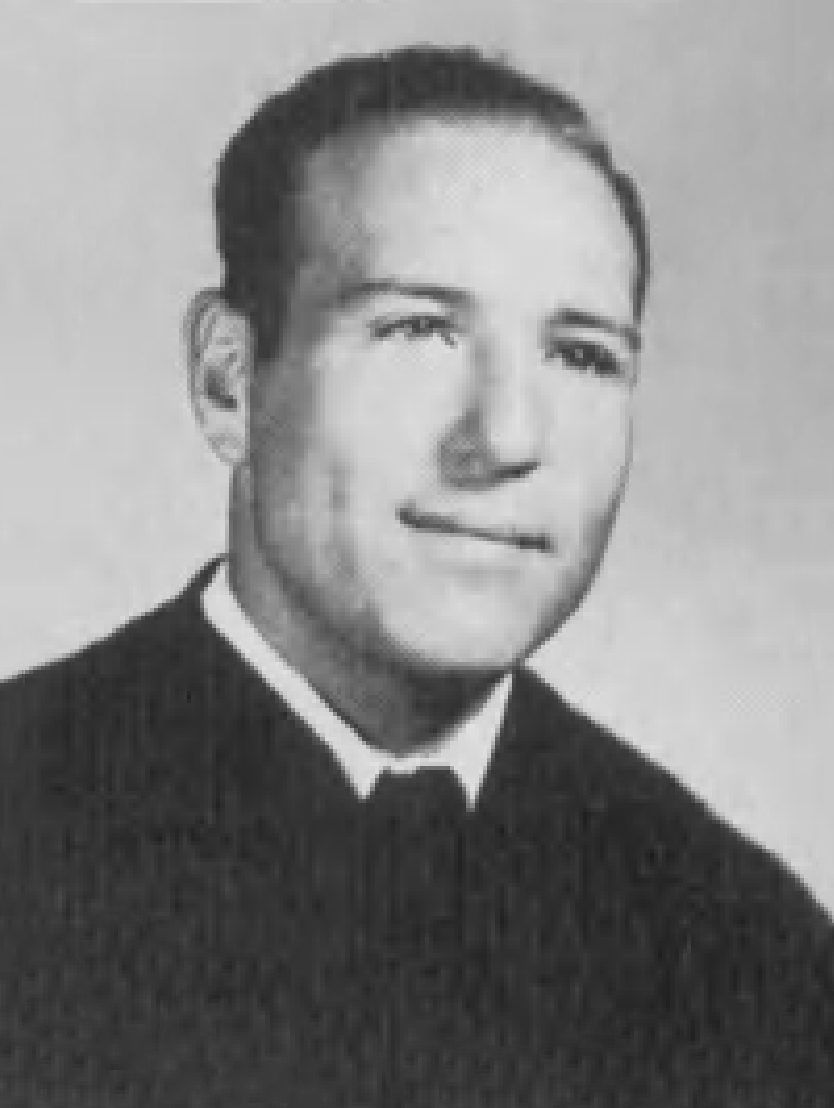
- Brocato, c. 1953

Profile
- Positions: Linebacker, placekicker

Personal information
- Born: October 31, 1929; Shreveport, Louisiana, U.S.
- Died: September 1, 2015 (aged 85); Arlington, Texas, U.S.
- Listed height: 5 ft 11 in (1.80 m)
- Listed weight: 185 lb (84 kg)

Career information
- High school: St. John's (Shreveport)
- College: Baylor (1949–1952)
- NFL draft: 1953: 27th round, 317th overall pick

Career history

Playing
- Chicago Cardinals (1953)*
- * Offseason or practice squad member only

Coaching
- Haynesville HS (LA) (1954–1957) Assistant coach; St. John's / Jesuit HS (LA) (1958–1968) Head coach; Northern Arizona (1969–1970) Defensive coordinator; Texas–Arlington (1971–1973) Defensive coordinator

Operations
- Houston Oilers (1974–1976) Area scout; United States Scouting Combine (1977–1981) Assistant director; Houston / Tennessee Oilers / Titans (1981–2015) Scout

Cosimo O. Brocato Jr. (October 31, 1929 – September 1, 2015) was an American scout, coach and football player best known for his time with the Houston / Tennessee Oilers / Titans, (Note: The franchise was known as the Houston Oilers through 1996, as the Tennessee Oilers from 1997 to 1998, and have been called the Tennessee Titans since.) for which he was a scout from 1974 to 1976, and again from 1981 until his death in 2015. A native of Shreveport, Louisiana, Brocato attended St. John's High School (renamed Jesuit High School in 1960) and later played college football for the Baylor Bears as a linebacker and placekicker. He was selected in the 1953 National Football League (NFL) draft by the Chicago Cardinals but left in training camp to begin a coaching career. He served as an assistant coach at Haynesville High School in Louisiana from 1954 to 1957, as the head coach of St. John's / Jesuit High School from 1958 to 1968, as the defensive coordinator for the Northern Arizona Lumberjacks from 1969 to 1970, and as the defensive coordinator for the Texas–Arlington Mavericks from 1971 to 1973.

Brocato resigned from Texas–Arlington in 1974 to become a scout for the Houston Oilers of the NFL for three seasons before spending 1977 through 1981 with the United States Scouting Combine, an organization that provided scouting data to NFL teams. He returned to the Oilers in 1981 and remained with them until his death in 2015. He is considered by his colleagues to have been one of the greatest scouts in football history and helped the team draft several players who went on to be inducted into the Pro Football Hall of Fame. Brocato invented the three-cone drill, one of the main events at the NFL Scouting Combine, and mentored numerous scouts during his career of over 40 years. He has been considered for induction to the Pro Football Hall of Fame on several occasions, and was a semifinalist for the classes of 2023 and 2024.

== Early life and playing career ==
Brocato was born on October 31, 1929, in Shreveport, Louisiana, to Rosa and Cosimo O. Brocato Sr. He had eight siblings – four brothers and four sisters. He attended St. John's High School and was a fullback and placekicker on the football team, playing in the first three seasons after the program was revived following World War II. Brocato was one of the area's leading scorers in 1947 and earned All-City honors; he was team captain as a senior in 1948. He also played baseball at St. John's.

=== Baylor ===
Brocato began attending Baylor University in 1949 after graduating from St. John's. He saw limited action in his first two years while playing at center and linebacker for the football team. He received more playing time on defense as a junior in 1951 and also served as their placekicker, gaining a reputation as one of the best college football kickers in clutch situations.

Brocato began the season with two missed extra point attempts against Houston. There were suggestions by fans to coach George Sauer that he find another player to attempt extra points and field goals, but Sauer said the problem was the holding of Cotton Davidson and kept Brocato in. In the next game, against Tulane, he converted three of four extra points as Baylor won 27–14. Against Arkansas in their third game, Brocato missed an extra point but successfully attempted an 11-yard field goal near the end of the game to win 9–7.

Brocato made four of six extra point tries against Texas Tech and all three to help Baylor tie Texas A&M in a crucial game. He later missed all three extra points against Texas, but rebounded with a six for six showing against Wake Forest. He converted both extra points against SMU, which allowed the Bears to win 14–13. For making the kicks when it mattered, Brocato was heralded as one of the nation's best "clutch" kickers; without "his toe sav[ing] the day" against SMU, Arkansas and Texas A&M, Baylor would have compiled a mediocre 6–4 mark, but instead, they went 8–1–1 and made their first major bowl game in school history. Including a 17–14 bowl loss against the Georgia Tech Yellow Jackets, Brocato finished the season having gone 25 for 35 on extra points and one for two on field goals. He also intercepted two passes while playing defense.

Brocato, known as "the Toe" or "the Foot", was named team co-captain as a senior in 1952 and opened the season by scoring two extra points and the game-winning field goal in Baylor's 17–14 win against Wake Forest. He missed all but one of his five extra point attempts in a 31–7 win against Washington State and afterward the team decided to use him only when points were needed. Three games later, against Texas A&M, he made all three extra points, including one in the final minutes that ultimately won the game 21–20. Baylor finished the season with a record of 4–4–2 and Brocato graduated in 1953.

Brocato was noted for his kicking style, which resulted in him not seeing any of his kicking attempts. According to the Waco Tribune-Herald: "He and the holder, Davidson, have a system. Brocato eyes the ball, kicks, then while still looking at the ground bends over and picks up a blade of grass. Davidson tells him if the kick was good." In addition to playing college football, Brocato was a backup catcher to Larry Isbell on the baseball team and competed at several Golden Gloves tournaments as a boxer.

=== After Baylor ===
Brocato was selected in the 27th round (317th overall) of the 1953 NFL draft by the Chicago Cardinals and signed his first contract on May 5. In August, the coach, Joe Stydahar, told him that at 185 pounds (84 kg) he was not heavy enough to play professionally, and Brocato left the team, intending to get a master's degree and then enter coaching.

Brocato also played minor league baseball with the Homer Oilers.

== Coaching career ==
Brocato entered coaching in 1954, serving as an assistant coach with Ed Michael under Billy Hudson for Haynesville High School as their Golden Tornado football team played in the inaugural year of Class AAA. He also was the head coach of the basketball team, assistant to the track team, and was a teacher. He taught social science and physical education for Haynesville. Brocato helped them reach the district championship in 1956, where they lost to Neville High School 18–0.

After four seasons at Haynesville, Brocato was named head football coach at St. John's High School, his alma mater, in 1958. Among his first actions was to change the team's name from "Blue Flyers" to "Flyers", declaring that, "from now on, we're just plain Flyers!" That year, he led them to what the Shreveport Journal described as their "most successful" season in several years, although they only went 4–6 with a loss to Homer High School in the finale. Brocato used the Winged-T offense, and although the formation was popular, The Guardian-Journal reported that "few ball clubs utilize all of the possibilities of this offense the way [St. John's] do[es]". St. John's was renamed to Jesuit High School in 1960; they compiled a 7–2–1 record that year, which was the first winning record for the school since Brocato's last year playing for them in 1948. Brocato led them to the district title and the Class AA state championship in 1961, where they lost to Neville 32–6. Four years later, he helped build what was described by the Shreveport Journal as the best team in school history up to that point, as Jesuit went 10–2 and won the district championship, before a tie to Morgan City High School knocked them out of the state playoffs. Brocato led them to another state championship in 1966, which they lost 7–0, and was named the district coach of the year. Jesuit finally became state champions under Brocato in 1967 while compiling a 13–0 record, for which he was named the Class AA coach of the year. He led them to a fourth consecutive district championship in 1968, his last season with the school.

Brocato resigned his post in 1969 to accept the position of defensive coordinator for the Northern Arizona Lumberjacks under head coach John Symank, finishing his stint at Jesuit with 19 consecutive wins in district play and an overall record of 75–36–9 over 11 seasons. In his first year at Northern Arizona, the 1969 Lumberjacks went 7–3, completing one of the best seasons for the program, which began play in 1925. He resigned following the 1970 season. Brocato later accepted a role as defensive coordinator with the Texas–Arlington Mavericks, following Symank who became their head coach. After Texas–Arlington started the 1972 season with six straight losses, the Mavericks defeated Southwestern Louisiana, 7–0, and Brocato was carried off the field by his players. They won five straight games to finish the season in second place in the conference with a mark of 5–6. Following the 1973 season, he resigned to become a scout for the Houston Oilers, despite being one of the candidates for the vacant head coaching position at Texas–Arlington.

=== Coaching style ===
Sportswriter Rick Woodson called Brocato one of the most unforgettable characters he had ever met and described his coaching style as follows:

The thing I remember most about a Brocato is that he usually wore a broad smile. When Cosmo [sic] smiled it was ear to ear. He had a quick laugh and a temper to match. His football players never quite knew if they were in a concentration camp or a resort. C. O. didn't hesitate to rake his players over the coals, but you'd better not say anything about them. They'd make him so mad he couldn't see, but C. O. loved them all. And they loved him.

Tony Papa, one of his assistant coaches at Jesuit, said, "[Brocato] is a man who off the field would do anything in the world for you. On the field, he didn't care if you were the star or an eighth-stringer, he would kick your rear end if you needed it ... Off the field you could talk and kid with him, but once you put on that uniform, baby, you had better buckle up and think about what you were doing."

== Scouting career ==
Brocato joined the Houston Oilers (now Tennessee Titans) of the NFL in 1974, and served three seasons as an area scout before becoming the assistant director of the United States Scouting Combine, a group that gave scouting data to 15 out of the then-28 NFL teams. He later returned to the Oilers in 1981 and remained with them until his death in 2015. He was with the team for 599 games; worked under 10 head coaches, seven general managers, and two owners; and gained a reputation as one of the greatest scouts in the history of the sport.

Brocato eventually moved up to national coordinator of college scouting with the Oilers/Titans, overseeing players around the country while focusing on the southwest states. He was known for doing extensive research and said that he would not stop until he knew everything there was to know about a player. Brocato added over 20,000 miles (32,000 km) to his vehicle every year – even when he was in his 70s – to scout players. His scouting process involved watching the players in practice, in games, at pro days and at the NFL Scouting Combine, then interviewing coaches, trainers, team staff and family members, after which he would watch more film of the players. Some who worked with him recalled that Brocato would write his reports on players using a pen, not a pencil, as he was so sure he was correct in his observations.

Brocato mentored many scouts during his career and many figures whom he worked with would go on to call him "legendary" and advocate for his induction into the Pro Football Hall of Fame. Alonzo Highsmith credited him for the advancement of his career and that of other southwest scouts, such as Joe Schoen and Chris Ballard, saying, "the more you hung with him, the better scout you were. I was fortunate to spend my first 14 years on the road with C. O., so I learned from him. He's been a big part in my success as a scout, and everything I do I pattern myself after C. O. Brocato. Those are true words. You look at the southwest area scouts and what they've done, and it's all because of C. O. Brocato. The guy had a huge impact on a lot of scouts."

Brocato was responsible for the Oilers/Titans drafting four players who went on to be inducted into the Hall of Fame, including Earl Campbell, whom he declared was his best pick. He recalled in 2015 that he attended the Cotton Bowl Classic to scout Campbell, and after seeing him run for the game's only touchdown in the second quarter – one that would help Texas upset No. 2-ranked Oklahoma – said that "I don't need to see any more" and went home. Other players Brocato described as his favorite picks were Mike Munchak and Ray Childress. He also was important in the team's drafting of quarterback Steve McNair, who led the team to their only Super Bowl appearance.

Long-time Oilers/Titans coach Jeff Fisher once said that he drafted a player in the first round whom Brocato gave a sixth-round rating, and said that Brocato's grade was correct. Fisher described Brocato as the "best scout – He was the guy you listened to. It was just him. He had it down. He did his work. He had his opinion, and his opinion never changed year after year after year. He was consistent, and he was right. He was always right." Additionally, Floyd Reese, a team executive, described Brocato as:

the ultimate scout, really. He probably mentored half of the scouts you see running around the league now. It was very important to him at a time when scouts might come and go a little bit. If you couldn't get a job as an assistant coach, maybe you would scout a while, and then do something else. He wanted to be a scout. He was good at being a scout and it was very important that it be done the right way, in a professional manner with a lot of integrity.

Brocato was involved in setting up many pro days and he usually had a seat at the end of the 40-yard dash from which he would watch. He improved the events at the NFL Scouting Combine and invented both the three-cone drill, one of the key tests, and an event for the evaluation of defensive backs.

Brocato was inducted into the S. M. McNaughton Chapter of the National Football Foundation and College Football Hall of Fame in 2002 for his contributions to amateur football and was awarded a game ball in 2004 by Titans team owner Bud Adams for his service with the franchise. The team named their draft room after him shortly before his death. He was on the preliminary list for induction to the Pro Football Hall of Fame for the classes of 2005, 2007, 2008, and 2012, and was a semifinalist in the contributor category for 2023 and 2024. The NFL named the C. O. Brocato Memorial Award in his honor, given to those who have "dedicated a lifetime of service to the scouting community".

== Personal life and death ==
Brocato married Lucy Jones in June 1953. He had one daughter with her. Brocato died on September 1, 2015, at the age of 85, from cancer. The Titans showed a video and held a moment of silence prior to their last preseason game of the 2015 season in honor of Brocato. In remembrance of him, at the 2016 NFL Combine, the letters "CO" were painted on the field and at the end of the 40-yard dash an empty chair was kept with a Titans hat and jacket.
