= 1972 Southwest Texas State Bobcats football team =

American college football season

1972 Southwest Texas State Bobcats football
- Conference: Lone Star Conference
- Record: 7–3 (6–2 LSC)
- Head coach: Bill Miller (8th season)
- Home stadium: Evans Field

1972 Lone Star Conference football standings
	Conf.					Overall
Team	W		L		T	W		L		T
No. 1 East Texas State $^	7	–	1	–	0	10	–	2	–	0
No. 12 Angelo State	6	–	2	–	0	8	–	3	–	0
Southwest Texas State	6	–	2	–	0	7	–	3	–	0
Howard Payne	4	–	4	–	0	5	–	4	–	0
Texas A&I	4	–	4	–	0	6	–	5	–	0
Sam Houston State	4	–	4	–	0	5	–	6	–	0
Sul Ross	3	–	5	–	0	5	–	6	–	0
Stephen F. Austin	2	–	6	–	0	2	–	7	–	0
Tarleton State	0	–	8	–	0	1	–	9	–	0
McMurry *	0	–	0	–	0	3	–	6	–	0
Abilene Christian *	0	–	0	–	0	3	–	8	–	0
$ – Conference champion; ^ – NAIA Division I playoff participant * – did not complete for conference title; Rankings from NAIA Division I poll

The 1972 Southwest Texas State Bobcats football team was an American football team that represented Southwest Texas State University (now known as Texas State University) during the 1972 NAIA football season as a member of the Lone Star Conference (LSC). In their eighth year under head coach Bill Miller, the team compiled an overall record of 7–3, with a mark of 6–2 in conference play.

== Schedule ==
Date	Opponent	Site	Result	Source
September 9	at Trinity (TX)*	E. M. Stevens Stadium; San Antonio, TX	L 7–9	
September 16	Texas Lutheran*	Evans Field; San Marcos, TX	W 17–12	
September 23	Angelo State	Evans Field; San Marcos, TX	W 10–3	
October 7	at Tarleton State	Stephenville, TX	W 50–14	
October 14	Stephen F. Austin	Evans Field; San Marcos, TX	W 24–20	
October 21	at Sam Houston State	Pritchett Field; Huntsville, TX (rivalry)	W 26–14	
October 28	at East Texas State	Memorial Stadium; Commerce, TX	L 29–32	
November 4	Howard Payne	Evans Field; San Marcos, TX	L 17–25	
November 10	vs. Sul Ross	Del Rio H.S. Stadium; Del Rio, TX	W 13–0	
November 18	Texas A&I	Evans Field; San Marcos, TX	W 20–16	
*Non-conference game
