= 1972 Sam Houston State Bearkats football team =

American college football season

1972 Sam Houston State Bearkats football
- Conference: Lone Star Conference
- Record: 5–6 (4–4 LSC)
- Head coach: Allen Boren (1st season)
- Home stadium: Pritchett Field

1972 Lone Star Conference football standings
	Conf.					Overall
Team	W		L		T	W		L		T
No. 1 East Texas State $^	7	–	1	–	0	10	–	2	–	0
No. 12 Angelo State	6	–	2	–	0	8	–	3	–	0
Southwest Texas State	6	–	2	–	0	7	–	3	–	0
Howard Payne	4	–	4	–	0	5	–	4	–	0
Texas A&I	4	–	4	–	0	6	–	5	–	0
Sam Houston State	4	–	4	–	0	5	–	6	–	0
Sul Ross	3	–	5	–	0	5	–	6	–	0
Stephen F. Austin	2	–	6	–	0	2	–	7	–	0
Tarleton State	0	–	8	–	0	1	–	9	–	0
McMurry *	0	–	0	–	0	3	–	6	–	0
Abilene Christian *	0	–	0	–	0	3	–	8	–	0
$ – Conference champion; ^ – NAIA Division I playoff participant * – did not complete for conference title; Rankings from NAIA Division I poll

The 1972 Sam Houston State Bearkats football team represented Sam Houston State University as a member of the Lone Star Conference (LSC) during the 1972 NAIA Division I football season. Led by first-year head coach Allen Boren, the Bearkats compiled an overall record of 5–6 with a mark of 4–4 in conference play, and finished tied for fourth in the LSC.

== Schedule ==
Date	Opponent	Site	Result	Attendance	Source
September 9	at Lamar*	Cardinal Stadium; Beaumont, TX	L 19–22	15,561	
September 16	at McNeese State*	Cowboy Stadium; Lake Charles, LA	L 0–28		
September 23	East Texas State	Pritchett Field; Huntsville, TX	L 0–23	7,000	
September 30	Sul Ross	Pritchett Field; Huntsville, TX	L 6–10		
October 7	at Angelo State	San Angelo Stadium; San Angelo, TX	L 6–27		
October 14	Tarleton State^{†}	Pritchett Field; Huntsville, TX	W 17–13		
October 21	Southwest Texas State	Pritchett Field; Huntsville, TX	L 14–26		
October 28	at Howard Payne	Cen-Tex Stadium; Brownwood, TX	W 13–3		
November 4	at Texas A&I	Javelina Stadium; Kingsville, TX	W 16–11		
November 11	Abilene Christian	Pritchett Field; Huntsville, TX	W 17–16	2,000	
November 17	at Stephen F. Austin	Memorial Stadium; Nacogdoches, TX (rivalry)	W 31–19		
*Non-conference game; ^{†}Homecoming
