= 1972 Lamar Cardinals football team =

American college football season

1972 Lamar Cardinals football
- Conference: Southland Conference
- Record: 8–3 (3–2 Southland)
- Head coach: Vernon Glass (10th season)
- Home stadium: Cardinal Stadium

1972 Southland Conference football standings
	Conf.					Overall
Team	W		L		T	W		L		T
No. 2 Louisiana Tech $	5	–	0	–	0	12	–	0	–	0
UT Arlington	4	–	1	–	0	5	–	6	–	0
No. T–10 McNeese State	3	–	2	–	0	8	–	3	–	0
Lamar	3	–	2	–	0	8	–	3	–	0
SW Louisiana	1	–	4	–	0	5	–	6	–	0
Arkansas State	1	–	4	–	0	4	–	7	–	0
Abilene Christian	1	–	5	–	0	3	–	8	–	0
$ – Conference champion; Rankings from AP small college poll

The 1972 Lamar Cardinals football team represented Lamar University as a member of the Southland Conference during the 1972 NCAA College Division football season. Led by tenth-year head coach Vernon Glass, the Cardinals compiled an overall record of 8–3 with a mark of 3–2 in conference play, tying for third place in the Southland. Lamar played home games at Cardinal Stadium in Beaumont, Texas.

== Schedule ==
Date	Time	Opponent	Site	Result	Attendance	Source
September 9		Sam Houston State*	Cardinal Stadium; Beaumont, TX	W 22–19	15,561	
September 16		at UTEP*	Sun Bowl; El Paso, TX	W 42–28	10,573	
September 23		Southern Illinois*	Cardinal Stadium; Beaumont, TX	W 7–0	11,300	
September 30	7:30 p.m.	at West Texas State*	Kimbrough Memorial Stadium; Canyon, TX	L 12–35	16,500	
October 7		No. 8 McNeese State	Cardinal Stadium; Beaumont, TX (Battle of the Border)	L 7–17	16,226	
October 14		Abilene Christian	Cardinal Stadium; Beaumont, TX	W 31–10	10,807	
October 21		at Southwestern Louisiana	Cajun Field; Lafayette, LA (rivalry)	W 3–0	14,772	
October 28		at Arkansas State	Kays Stadium; Jonesboro, AR	W 26–24	6,500	
November 4		at New Mexico State*	Memorial Stadium; Las Cruces, NM	W 24–19	5,353	
November 11		Nicholls State*	Cardinal Stadium; Beaumont, TX	W 22–10	8,500	
November 18	7:30 p.m.	UT Arlington	Cardinal Stadium; Beaumont, TX	L 3–10	2,200	
*Non-conference game; Rankings from AP Poll released prior to the game; All times are in Central time
