= 1972 Arkansas State Indians football team =

American college football season

1972 Arkansas State Indians football
- Conference: Southland Conference
- Record: 3–8 (1–4 Southland)
- Head coach: Bill Davidson (2nd season)
- Home stadium: Kays Stadium; War Memorial Stadium

1972 Southland Conference football standings
	Conf.					Overall
Team	W		L		T	W		L		T
No. 2 Louisiana Tech $	5	–	0	–	0	12	–	0	–	0
UT Arlington	4	–	1	–	0	5	–	6	–	0
No. T–10 McNeese State	3	–	2	–	0	8	–	3	–	0
Lamar	3	–	2	–	0	8	–	3	–	0
SW Louisiana	1	–	4	–	0	5	–	6	–	0
Arkansas State	1	–	4	–	0	4	–	7	–	0
Abilene Christian	1	–	5	–	0	3	–	8	–	0
$ – Conference champion; Rankings from AP small college poll

The 1972 Arkansas State Indians football team represented Arkansas State University as a member of the Southland Conference during the 1972 NCAA College Division football season. Led by second-year head coach Bill Davidson, the Indians compiled an overall record of 3–8 with a mark of 1–4 in conference play, placing in a three-way tie for fifth in the Southland.

== Schedule ==
Date	Time	Opponent	Site	Result	Attendance	Source
September 9		McNeese State	Kays Stadium; Jonesboro, AR	L 17–27	9,500	
September 16		at Eastern New Mexico*	Greyhound Stadium; Portales, NM	W 39–7	2,500	
September 23	7:30 p.m.	Wichita State*	Kays Stadium; Jonesboro, AR	L 0–6	6,500	
September 30		at Southwestern Louisiana	Cajun Field; Lafayette, LA	W 21–18	12,456	
October 7		at Chattanooga*	Chamberlain Field; Chattanooga, TN	L 3–21	8,000	
October 14		No. 1 Louisiana Tech	War Memorial Stadium; Little Rock, AR	L 17–38	13,000	
October 21		at Abilene Christian	Shotwell Stadium; Abilene, TX	L 0–3	7,200	
October 28		Lamar	Kays Stadium; Jonesboro, AR	L 24–26	6,500	
November 4		at Northeast Louisiana*	Brown Stadium; Monroe, LA	W 14–13	8,300	
November 18		Trinity (TX)*^{†}	Kays Stadium; Jonesboro, AR	L 22–32	6,000	
November 25	7:32 p.m.	at UT Arlington	Arlington Stadium; Arlington, TX	L 6–7	2,200	
*Non-conference game; ^{†}Homecoming; Rankings from AP Poll released prior to the game; All times are in Central time
