= 1972 UT Arlington Mavericks football team =

American college football season

1972 UT Arlington Mavericks football
- Conference: Southland Conference
- Record: 5–6 (4–1 Southland)
- Head coach: John Symank (2nd season)
- Defensive coordinator: C. O. Brocato (2nd season)
- Home stadium: Arlington Stadium

1972 Southland Conference football standings
	Conf.					Overall
Team	W		L		T	W		L		T
No. 2 Louisiana Tech $	5	–	0	–	0	12	–	0	–	0
UT Arlington	4	–	1	–	0	5	–	6	–	0
No. T–10 McNeese State	3	–	2	–	0	8	–	3	–	0
Lamar	3	–	2	–	0	8	–	3	–	0
SW Louisiana	1	–	4	–	0	5	–	6	–	0
Arkansas State	1	–	4	–	0	4	–	7	–	0
Abilene Christian	1	–	5	–	0	3	–	8	–	0
$ – Conference champion; Rankings from AP small college poll

The 1972 UT Arlington Mavericks football team was an American football team that represented the University of Texas at Arlington in the Southland Conference during the 1972 NCAA College Division football season. In their second year under head coach John Symank, the team compiled a 5–6 record.

== Schedule ==
Date	Time	Opponent	Site	Result	Attendance	Source
September 9		at Southern Miss*	Faulkner Field; Hattiesburg, MS	L 17–38	10,200	
September 16		at Oklahoma State*	Lewis Field; Stillwater, OK	L 3–21	31,500	
September 23	6:30 p.m.	at Toledo*	Glass Bowl; Toledo, OH	L 24–38	17,128	
September 30	7:30 p.m.	at TCU*	Amon G. Carter Stadium; Fort Worth, TX	L 14–38	22,300	
October 7	7:30 p.m.	No. 2 Louisiana Tech	Arlington Stadium; Arlington, TX	L 14–35	7,300	
October 21	8:30 p.m.	at New Mexico State*	Memorial Stadium; Las Cruces, NM	L 12–17	7,255	
October 28	7:30 p.m.	Southwestern Louisiana	Arlington Stadium; Arlington, TX	W 7–0	1,500	
November 4	7:30 p.m.	at Abilene Christian	Shotwell Stadium; Abilene, TX	W 36–22	8,000	
November 11	2:00 p.m.	West Texas State*	Arlington Stadium; Arlington, TX	W 20–7	8,600	
November 18	7:30 p.m.	at Lamar	Cardinal Stadium; Beaumont, TX	W 10–3	2,200	
November 25	7:32 p.m.	Arkansas State	Arlington Stadium; Arlington, TX	W 7–6	2,200	
*Non-conference game; Rankings from AP Poll released prior to the game; All times are in Central time
