= 1972 McNeese State Cowboys football team =

American college football season

1972 McNeese State Cowboys football
- Conference: Southland Conference
- Record: 8–3 (3–2 Southland)
- Head coach: Jack Doland (3rd season)
- Home stadium: Cowboy Stadium

1972 Southland Conference football standings
	Conf.					Overall
Team	W		L		T	W		L		T
No. 2 Louisiana Tech $	5	–	0	–	0	12	–	0	–	0
UT Arlington	4	–	1	–	0	5	–	6	–	0
No. T–10 McNeese State	3	–	2	–	0	8	–	3	–	0
Lamar	3	–	2	–	0	8	–	3	–	0
SW Louisiana	1	–	4	–	0	5	–	6	–	0
Arkansas State	1	–	4	–	0	4	–	7	–	0
Abilene Christian	1	–	5	–	0	3	–	8	–	0
$ – Conference champion; Rankings from AP small college poll

The 1972 McNeese State Cowboys football team was an American football team that represented McNeese State University as a member of the Southland Conference (Southland) during the 1972 NCAA College Division football season. In their third year under head coach Jack Doland, the team compiled an overall record of 8–3 with a mark of 3–2 in conference play, and finished tied for third in the Southland.

== Schedule ==
Date	Opponent	Rank	Site	Result	Attendance	Source
September 9	at Arkansas State		Kays Stadium; Jonesboro, AR	W 27–17	9,500	
September 16	Sam Houston State*		Cowboy Stadium; Lake Charles, LA	W 28–0	13,500	
September 23	at No. 3 Louisiana Tech	No. T–5	Louisiana Tech Stadium; Ruston, LA	L 17–34	19,200	
October 7	at Lamar	No. 8	Cardinal Stadium; Beaumont, TX (rivalry)	W 17–7	16,226	
October 14	Northeast Louisiana	No. 5	Cowboy Stadium; Lake Charles, LA	W 31–14	12,600	
October 21	at Nicholls State*	No. 4	John L. Guidry Stadium; Thibodaux, LA	W 24–7	7,600	
October 28	vs. Troy State*	No. 5	Memorial Stadium; Fort Walton Beach, FL	W 13–7	6,500	
November 4	Northwestern State*	No. 7	Cowboy Stadium; Lake Charles, LA (rivalry)	L 10–25	14,000	
November 11	at Southeastern Louisiana*	No. 10	Strawberry Stadium; Hammond, LA	W 31–13	4,500	
November 18	Abilene Christian	No. 9	Cowboy Stadium; Lake Charles, LA	W 22–0	8,750	
November 25	Southwestern Louisiana	No. T–10	Cowboy Stadium; Lake Charles, LA (rivalry)	L 0–10	14,000	
*Non-conference game; Rankings from AP Poll released prior to the game
