= John Symank =

American football player and coach (1935–2002)

No. 27, 31
- Position: Defensive back

Personal information
- Born: August 31, 1935; La Grange, Texas, U.S.
- Died: January 23, 2002 (aged 66); Dauphin Island, Alabama, U.S.
- Listed height: 5 ft 11 in (1.80 m)
- Listed weight: 180 lb (82 kg)

Career information
- High school: Caldwell (TX)
- College: Florida
- NFL draft: 1957: 23rd round, 268th overall pick

Career history

Playing
- Green Bay Packers (1957–1962); St. Louis Cardinals (1963)

Coaching
- Tulane (1964) Assistant; Virginia (1965) Assistant; Atlanta Falcons (1966–1968) Defensive backs; Northern Arizona (1969–1970) Head coach; UT Arlington (1971–1973) Head coach; New York Giants (1974–1978) Defensive backs; Baltimore Colts (1979–1981) Defensive backs; LSU (1984–1986) Assistant

Awards and highlights
- University of Florida Athletic Hall of Fame; 2× NFL Champion (1961, 1962)

Career NFL statistics
- Interceptions: 19
- Fumble recoveries: 12
- Total touchdowns: 1
- Stats at Pro Football Reference

Head coaching record
- Regular season: NCAA: 20–32–0 (.385)

John Richard Symank (August 31, 1935 – January 23, 2002) was an American college and professional football player who was a defensive back in the National Football League (NFL) for seven seasons during the 1950s and 1960s. Symank played college football for the University of Florida, and thereafter, he played professionally for the Green Bay Packers and St. Louis Cardinals of the NFL. He was later the head coach for Northern Arizona University and the University of Texas at Arlington football teams.

== Early life ==
Symank was born in LaGrange, Texas in 1935, to Oswald "Curly" and Ann Pauline Symank. Symank's family was of Wendish descent, a Slavic group that emigrated to Central Texas in the mid-nineteenth century from Germany.

Symank's father died when Johnny was only 8 years old. Symank attended Caldwell High School in Caldwell, Texas, where he excelled in sports and lettered in high school football and track and field for the Caldwell Hornets.

== College career ==
After graduating from high school, Symank attended Arlington State Junior College in Arlington, Texas, and played for the Arlington Rebels football team under coach Chena Gilstrap in 1953 and 1954. Symank enrolled in the college's Reserve Officers' Training Corps (ROTC) unit to fulfill his military obligation and remained an active ROTC member throughout his college career.

Symank accepted an athletic scholarship to transfer to the University of Florida in Gainesville, Florida, where he played for coach Bob Woodruff's Florida Gators football team in 1955 and 1956. Woodruff later ranked Symank as one of the five best defensive backs to play for the Gators during the 1950s, and one of the ten best offensive backs of the decade.

While he was a Gator, he earned two varsity letters in both football and track, and became a captain in the university's ROTC unit. Symank graduated from Florida with a bachelor's degree in business administration in 1957, and was later inducted into the University of Florida Athletic Hall of Fame as a "Gator Great."

== Professional playing career ==
Green Bay Packers scout Jack Vainisi "discovered" Symank, and the Packers subsequently selected him in the twenty-third round (268th pick overall) of the 1957 NFL draft. Despite Symank making the NFL record books his rookie season with nine pass interceptions, Green Bay finished the 1957 season with a losing 3–9 record.

During the 1958 season, the Packers played the undefeated Baltimore Colts on their home field in Baltimore in the third game of the season. The Colts had talented second-year quarterback Johnny Unitas and were on their way to 1958 NFL Championship. In the second quarter, Symank made a hit on Unitas that resulted in three broken ribs and a punctured lung. Some sports commentators described it as a "late hit" that happened as the play ended; Sarah Symank said that after the Packers reviewed the film, "it appeared to be a clean hit." Baltimore fans, and especially the press, were not so forgiving and many sports columnists accused Symank of breaking Unitas' ribs in a questionable play. The Colts won the game 56–0, and Unitas missed only two games from his injury. Years later, when Symank was a Baltimore Colts assistant coach, and Unitas was retired from football, the two became close friends.

He is only 5-11 and at 180 pounds he is the lightest man on this squad. Compared with the others he looks like a baseball infielder, but he is a football player. . . . There is no actor in Symank. He is serious and intense, and in a game he would just as soon break your leg as not. He has made it in this league because he gets a great deal more out of himself than his ability and size justify . . . but John gets the maximum out of himself in every game, and if I had thirty-five others like him I would have a far better team than I have.

— Coach Vince Lombardi, describing Johnny Symank
as a professional football player in Run to Daylight.

After two back-to-back losing seasons with the Packers, Symank's career fortunes turned when new coach Vince Lombardi took total control of the Green Bay Packers organization—on and off the field. Lombardi, who had worked the previous five seasons as an assistant coach for the New York Giants, was an enthusiastic leader eager to prove himself as a head coach. The Packers narrowly missed a shot at the NFL championship and Lombardi was recognized as the NFL coach of the year in 1959.

In 1960, the Packers returned with renewed confidence in themselves and Lombardi's system and philosophy. Symank led the Packers in both interception-return and kickoff-return yardage, helping his team get to the 1960 NFL Championship Game. During the game, the Philadelphia Eagles' quarterback Norm Van Brocklin, on second down, threw a pass from the Packers' five-yard-line that Symank intercepted in the end zone for a touchback. This set up three downs and out as Packers quarterback Bart Starr threw three straight incomplete passes. On a fake punt play that was not ordered by Lombardi, Packers punter Max McGee ran thirty-five yards up the middle of the field for the first down; the Packers then drove the length of the field for a touchdown, putting the Packers back in the game. Despite the Packers furious fourth-quarter efforts, they fell eight yards short of winning the 1960 NFL championship as time expired; the final score was Philadelphia over Green Bay 17–13.

During the 1961 season, Lombardi led the Packers to an improved record of 11–3, a Western Conference title, and a short trip to the 1961 NFL Championship Game. The New Year's Eve game, held in Green Bay, was the first NFL game ever to gross over one million dollars, and was attended by 39,029 people. Symank started and played in almost every defensive play of the game, as the Packers defense held the Giants scoreless in a 37–0 blow-out. The following season, Lombardi led Symank and the Packers to another victory in the 1962 NFL Championship Game.

In 1963, Symank was traded along with Bill Quinlan to the New York Giants. Before Symank ever wore a Giants uniform, he was traded again to the St. Louis Cardinals, where he played his final 9–5 season under coach Wally Lemm. During Symank's seven-year NFL career, he played in eighty-nine regular season games, recovered twelve fumbles, intercepted nineteen passes and returning them for 387 yards and a touchdown.

== Coaching career ==
=== Early assistantships ===
Symank's college and professional coaching career spanned two and a half decades. Symank's first assistant coaching job was at Tulane University in New Orleans, Louisiana in 1964, when he met fellow assistant coach Bill Arnsparger, a relationship that spanned Symank's entire coaching career. In 1965, he went to the University of Virginia in Charlottesville, Virginia and worked under head coach George Blackburn.

Norb Hecker, one of Lombardi's assistants who coached Symank at Green Bay, became the head coach of the Atlanta Falcons, the NFL's new expansions team, in 1966. Hecker recruited Symank to join the Falcons' first coaching staff. In 1967, Symank and Hecker were joined in Atlanta by former Packer Lew Carpenter. The Falcons' owner was frustrated with his team's 4–26–1 record, and Hecker was fired after the third game of his third season. Former Eagles quarterback Norm Van Brocklin took over as the Falcons head coach for the balance of the 1968 season, and the Falcons assistant coaches including Symank were fired at season's end.

=== College head coach ===
Symank was the head football coach for Northern Arizona University (NAU) in Flagstaff, Arizona in 1969 and 1970, He picked his former Packers teammate and quarterback Lamar McHan as his offensive coordinator and C. O. Brocato, a very successful coach at Jesuit High School in Shreveport, Louisiana, as his defensive coordinator. The trio coached the NAU Lumberjacks together for two years and moved again when his alma mater, the University of Texas at Arlington (formerly Arlington State Junior College), asked him to be the head coach of the UT Arlington Mavericks. Symank was the eleventh head college football coach for the Arlington Mavericks, and he held that position for three seasons, from 1971 until 1973. He and his assistants assumed command over a completely demoralized team and set out to rebuild the program using the same techniques he had learned from Lombardi. Symank's three-year win–loss record at UT Arlington was 11–21.

=== Return to the NFL ===
Bill Arnsparger became the head coach of the New York Giants in 1974, and called Symank to join his new staff. After winning just seven games in three seasons, Arnsparger was fired in 1976. Symank was hired by Ted Marchibroda as an assistant coach for the Baltimore Colts, and also coached under Marchibroda's successor, Mike McCormack, from 1980 to 1981. After years of frustration, the Colts management was ready to make major changes, so Symank, along with the rest of the Colts coaches, were fired.

=== At home in Louisiana ===
In 1984 a new opportunity presented itself when Bill Arnsparger accepted the head coaching position at Louisiana State University (LSU) in Baton Rouge, Louisiana. Hired to be the LSU defensive coordinator, Symank was the first assistant hired by Arnsparger. The LSU Tigers posted an 8–3–2 record, including the loss to Nebraska in the Sugar Bowl. Arnsparger earned the SEC's Coach of the Year award for turning around an LSU program that had a losing 4–7 record the year before. In 1985 the Tigers came back even stronger, and Symank moved from defensive coordinator to coach the Tigers linebackers and coordinate Arnsparger's recruiting program. He had an affinity for recruiting small town high school players, and felt it was his duty to give promising young players the same chance he had been given. A college education, four years playing college football, and maybe a shot at an NFL roster, but most importantly, Symank would always say: "get that diploma because no matter how good you are, you can't play forever."

Symank died at his beach house on Dauphin Island, Alabama in 2002; he was 66 years old. He was survived by his wife Sarah and their children.

== Head coaching record ==
Year	Team	Overall	Conference	Standing	Bowl/playoffs
Northern Arizona Lumberjacks (NCAA College Division independent) (1969)
1969	Northern Arizona	7–3			
Northern Arizona Lumberjacks (Big Sky Conference) (1970)
1970	Northern Arizona	2–8	0–4	7th	
Northern Arizona:		9–11	0–4		
UT Arlington Mavericks (Southland Conference) (1971–1973)
1971	UT Arlington	2–9	1–4	T–6th	
1972	UT Arlington	5–6	4–1	2nd	
1973	UT Arlington	4–6	2–3	T–4th	
UT Arlington:		11–21	7–8		
Total:		20–32			

== See also ==
- List of Florida Gators in the NFL draft
- List of University of Florida alumni
- List of University of Florida Athletic Hall of Fame members
