= 1972 Louisiana Tech Bulldogs football team =

American college football season

1972 Louisiana Tech Bulldogs football

National Football Foundation College Division national champion NCAA College Division Mideast Region champion Southland Conference champion Grantland Rice Bowl champion

Grantland Rice Bowl, W 35–0 vs. Tennessee Tech
- Conference: Southland Conference

Ranking
- AP: No. 2
- Record: 12–0 (5–0 Southland)
- Head coach: Maxie Lambright (6th season)
- Captains: Eric Johnson; Wayne Smith
- Home stadium: Louisiana Tech Stadium

1972 Southland Conference football standings
	Conf.					Overall
Team	W		L		T	W		L		T
No. 2 Louisiana Tech $	5	–	0	–	0	12	–	0	–	0
UT Arlington	4	–	1	–	0	5	–	6	–	0
No. T–10 McNeese State	3	–	2	–	0	8	–	3	–	0
Lamar	3	–	2	–	0	8	–	3	–	0
SW Louisiana	1	–	4	–	0	5	–	6	–	0
Arkansas State	1	–	4	–	0	4	–	7	–	0
Abilene Christian	1	–	5	–	0	3	–	8	–	0
$ – Conference champion; Rankings from AP small college poll

The 1972 Louisiana Tech Bulldogs football team was an American football team that represented Louisiana Tech University as a member of the Southland Conference during the 1972 NCAA College Division football season. In their sixth year under head coach Maxie Lambright, the team compiled a 12–0 record, were National Football Foundation College Division national champion, NCAA College Division Mideast Region champion, Southland Conference champion, and defeated Tennessee Tech in the Grantland Rice Bowl.

== Schedule ==
Date	Time	Opponent	Rank	Site	Result	Attendance	Source
September 9		at Southwestern Louisiana		Cajun Field; Lafayette, LA (rivalry)	W 7–0	21,707	
September 16		at Southern Miss*		Faulkner Field; Hattiesburg, MS (rivalry)	W 33–14	11,600	
September 23		No. T–5 McNeese State	No. 3	Louisiana Tech Stadium; Ruston, LA	W 34–17	19,200	
September 30		Abilene Christian	No. 2	Louisiana Tech Stadium; Ruston, LA	W 35–12	13,500	
October 7	7:30 p.m.	at UT Arlington	No. 2	Arlington Stadium; Arlington, TX	W 35–14	7,300	
October 14		at Arkansas State	No. 1	War Memorial Stadium; Little Rock, AR	W 38–17	13,000	
October 21		vs. Northwestern State*	No. 1	State Fair Stadium; Shreveport, LA (rivalry)	W 20–16	27,000	
October 28		Southeastern Louisiana*	No. 2	Louisiana Tech Stadium; Ruston, LA	W 21–0	11,000	
November 4		at Northern Arizona*	No. 2	Lumberjack Stadium; Flagstaff, AZ	W 41–21	7,750	
November 11		Eastern Michigan*	No. 2	Louisiana Tech Stadium; Ruston, LA	W 24–17	15,736	
November 18		at Northeast Louisiana*	No. 2	Brown Stadium; Monroe, LA (rivalry)	W 10–6	6,000–7,000	
December 9		vs. No. 5 Tennessee Tech*	No. 2	BREC Memorial Stadium; Baton Rouge, LA (Grantland Rice Bowl)	W 35–0	10,000	
*Non-conference game; Rankings from AP Poll released prior to the game; All times are in Central time
