= Three-cone drill =

Test in American football

The three-cone drill, 3-cone drill or L-drill is a test performed by American football players. It is primarily run to evaluate the agility, quickness and fluidity of movement of players by scouts. It is most commonly seen at the NFL Combine in preparation for the NFL draft but is also an important measurement for collegiate recruiting. While not as highly regarded a test as the 40-yard dash, it is still an important measure used by team personnel to compare players. It is especially pertinent in the evaluation of pass rushers who must be able to maintain acceleration while working around offensive line players. The drill was invented by football scout C. O. Brocato.

== The drill ==
Three cones are placed five yards apart from each other forming a right angle. The athlete starts with one hand down on the ground and runs to the middle cone and touches it. The player then reverses direction back to the starting cone and touches it. The athlete reverses direction again but this time runs around the outside of the middle cone on the way to the far cone running around it in figure eight fashion on his way back around the outside of the middle cornering cone. Athletes are timed for this whole procedure. This drill is primarily used to determine a player's agility.
