= 1972 Jacksonville State Gamecocks football team =

American college football season

1972 Jacksonville State Gamecocks football
- Conference: Gulf South Conference
- Record: 7–2–1 (4–1–1 GSC)
- Head coach: Charley Pell (4th season)
- Offensive coordinator: Clarkie Mayfield (4th season)
- Home stadium: Paul Snow Stadium

1972 Gulf South Conference football standings
	Conf.					Overall
Team	W		L		T	W		L		T
No. 5 Northwestern State $	6	–	0	–	0	8	–	2	–	0
No. 3 Livingston ^	5	–	1	–	0	8	–	1	–	2
No. 19 Jacksonville State	4	–	1	–	1	7	–	2	–	1
Delta State	5	–	2	–	0	7	–	3	–	1
Troy State	2	–	3	–	1	4	–	5	–	1
Southeastern Louisiana	2	–	4	–	0	4	–	7	–	0
Nicholls State	1	–	5	–	0	3	–	8	–	0
Florence State	1	–	5	–	0	2	–	9	–	0
Tennessee–Martin	1	–	5	–	0	1	–	9	–	0
Mississippi College *	0	–	0	–	0	4	–	5	–	1
$ – Conference champion; ^ – NAIA Division I playoff participant * – Did not compete for conference title; Rankings from NAIA Division I poll

The 1972 Jacksonville State Gamecocks football team represented Jacksonville State University as a member of the Gulf South Conference (GSC) during the 1972 NAIA Division I football season. Led by fourth-year head coach Charley Pell, the Gamecocks compiled an overall record of 7–2–1 with a mark of 4–1–1 in conference play, and finished third in the GSC.

== Additions ==
=== Incoming transfers ===
Player	Position	Former team
Ralph Brock	QB	Auburn

== Schedule ==
Date	Opponent	Site	Result	Source
September 9	Nicholls State	Paul Snow Stadium; Jacksonville, AL	W 31–0	
September 23	at Tennessee–Martin	Pacer Stadium; Martin, TN	W 20–6	
September 30	Quantico Marines*	Paul Snow Stadium; Jacksonville, AL	W 28–15	
October 7	at Livingston	Tiger Stadium; Livingston, AL	L 17–21	
October 14	Southeastern Louisiana	Paul Snow Stadium; Jacksonville, AL	W 10–7	
October 21	Bluefield*	Paul Snow Stadium; Jacksonville, AL	W 41–3	
October 28	at Western Carolina*	Memorial Stadium; Cullowhee, NC	L 12–17	
November 4	Samford*	Memorial Stadium; Anniston, AL (rivalry)	W 27–6	
November 11	Troy State	Paul Snow Stadium; Jacksonville, AL (rivalry)	T 14–14	
November 18	Florence State^{†}	Paul Snow Stadium; Jacksonville, AL	W 39–20	
*Non-conference game; ^{†}Homecoming

== Roster ==
1972 Jacksonville State Gamecocks football team roster
Players
Coaches
Offense

Pos.	#	Name	Class
G		Sam Johnson
WR		Hassel Walls
RB		Boyce Callahan
OT		George Porter
OT		Ron Beaucham
QB		Ralph Brock
QB		Buddy Talley
FB		Gordon Knowlton
C		Bill Glover

Defense

Pos.	#	Name	Class
DL		Gene Preskitt
LB		Scotty Marcus
LB		Wayne Carden

Special teams

Pos.	#	Name	Class
K		Joe Hix	Fr

Head coach

- Charley Pell

Coordinators/assistant coaches

- Cotton Clark
- Jim Fuller
- Kyle Albright
- Clarkie Mayfield (QB)

Legend

- (C) Team captain
- (S) Suspended
- (I) Ineligible
- Injured
- Redshirt
