= 1972 Troy State Red Wave football team =

American college football season

1972 Troy State Red Wave football
- Conference: Gulf South Conference
- Record: 4–5–1 (2–3–1 GSC)
- Head coach: Tom Jones (1st season)
- Home stadium: Veterans Memorial Stadium

1972 Gulf South Conference football standings
	Conf.					Overall
Team	W		L		T	W		L		T
No. 5 Northwestern State $	6	–	0	–	0	8	–	2	–	0
No. 3 Livingston ^	5	–	1	–	0	8	–	1	–	2
No. 19 Jacksonville State	4	–	1	–	1	7	–	2	–	1
Delta State	5	–	2	–	0	7	–	3	–	1
Troy State	2	–	3	–	1	4	–	5	–	1
Southeastern Louisiana	2	–	4	–	0	4	–	7	–	0
Nicholls State	1	–	5	–	0	3	–	8	–	0
Florence State	1	–	5	–	0	2	–	9	–	0
Tennessee–Martin	1	–	5	–	0	1	–	9	–	0
Mississippi College *	0	–	0	–	0	4	–	5	–	1
$ – Conference champion; ^ – NAIA Division I playoff participant * – Did not compete for conference title; Rankings from NAIA Division I poll

The 1972 Troy State Red Wave football team represented Troy State University (now known as Troy University) as a member of the Gulf South Conference (GSC) during the 1972 NAIA Division I football season. Led by first-year head coach Tom Jones, the Red Wave compiled an overall record of 4–5–1 with a mark of 2–3–1 in conference play, placing fifth in the GSC.

== Schedule ==
Date	Opponent	Site	Result	Attendance	Source
September 7	vs. Elon*	Cramton Bowl; Montgomery, AL	W 28–24	7,000	
September 16	Austin Peay*	Rip Hewes Stadium; Dothan, AL	W 27–0	6,500	
September 23	vs. Livingston	Cramton Bowl; Montgomery, AL	L 3–14	8,000–8,500	
September 30	Ouachita Baptist*	Veterans Memorial Stadium; Troy, AL	L 0–14	5,000	
October 7	at Southeastern Louisiana	Strawberry Stadium; Hammond, LA	L 19–20	8,300	
October 14	Delta State	Veterans Memorial Stadium; Troy, AL	L 17–22	8,000	
October 21	at Florence State	Braly Municipal Stadium; Florence, AL	W 33–0	4,000	
October 28	vs. McNeese State*	Memorial Stadium; Fort Walton Beach, FL	L 7–13	6,500	
November 4	at Tennessee–Martin	Pacer Stadium; Martin, TN	W 28–23	7,500	
November 11	at Jacksonville State	Paul Snow Stadium; Jacksonville, AL (rivalry)	T 14–14	7,000–8,000	
*Non-conference game
