= 1972 East Texas State Lions football team =

American college football season

1972 East Texas State Lions football

NAIA Division I champion LSC champion

NAIA Division I Football Championship, W 21–18 vs. Carson–Newman
- Conference: Lone Star Conference
- Record: 10–2 (7–1 LSC)
- Head coach: Ernest Hawkins (9th season)
- Offensive scheme: Option
- Defensive coordinator: Bobby Fox (2nd season)
- Base defense: 5–2
- Home stadium: Memorial Stadium

1972 Lone Star Conference football standings
	Conf.					Overall
Team	W		L		T	W		L		T
No. 1 East Texas State $^	7	–	1	–	0	10	–	2	–	0
No. 12 Angelo State	6	–	2	–	0	8	–	3	–	0
Southwest Texas State	6	–	2	–	0	7	–	3	–	0
Howard Payne	4	–	4	–	0	5	–	4	–	0
Texas A&I	4	–	4	–	0	6	–	5	–	0
Sam Houston State	4	–	4	–	0	5	–	6	–	0
Sul Ross	3	–	5	–	0	5	–	6	–	0
Stephen F. Austin	2	–	6	–	0	2	–	7	–	0
Tarleton State	0	–	8	–	0	1	–	9	–	0
McMurry *	0	–	0	–	0	3	–	6	–	0
Abilene Christian *	0	–	0	–	0	3	–	8	–	0
$ – Conference champion; ^ – NAIA Division I playoff participant * – did not complete for conference title; Rankings from NAIA Division I poll

The 1972 East Texas State Lions football team represented East Texas State University in the 1972 NAIA Division I football season. They were led by head coach Ernest Hawkins, who was in his ninth season at East Texas State. The Lions played their home games at Memorial Stadium and were members of the Lone Star Conference. The Lions won the Lone Star Conference, the NAIA District IV, and the NAIA Division I National Championship.

Heading into the 1972 season, the Lions were picked to finish fourth in the conference, and started out the season with 14–12 loss to rival Abilene Christian, but then racked up six straight wins to climb into the national polls. Then The Lions were upset by Sul Ross, dropping them out of the top five in the rankings. The Lions finished the season with wins over Angelo State and Tarleton State. When the final national rankings came out, the Lions were ranked fourth in the nation and invited to the NAIA Division I playoffs. In the semifinal round the Lions faced the top-ranked team in the nation, the Central State Bronchos of Oklahoma. The Lions routed Central State, 54–0 in the earning them a spot in Champion Bowl against the second-ranked Carson–Newman. The title game was determined to be played in Commerce. On a bitterly cold December day in front of a packed Memorial Stadium, Hawkins's Lions defeated Carson–Newman, 21–18, to claim the national title. Among the players on the team were future National Football League (NFL) players Will Cureton, Harvey Martin, Autry Beamon, Aundra Thompson, and Tim Collier. The Lions were named the National Team of the Year and Hawkins was named both Lone Star Conference Coach of the Year and National Coach of the Year.

== Schedule ==
Date	Time	Opponent	Rank	Site	Result	Attendance	Source
September 9	2:00 p.m.	at Abilene Christian*		Shotwell Stadium; Abilene, TX	L 12–14	6,325	
September 16	6:00 p.m.	at East Central*		Norris Field; Ada, OK	W 37–14		
September 23	6:00 p.m.	at Sam Houston State		Pritchett Field; Huntsville, TX	W 23–0	7,000	
September 30	6:00 p.m.	Howard Payne		Memorial Stadium; Commerce, TX	W 35–15		
October 7	2:00 p.m.	at No. 12 Texas A&I		Memorial Stadium; Commerce, TX (rivalry)	W 29–17		
October 21	2:00 pm	at Stephen F. Austin		Memorial Stadium; Nacogdoches, TX	W 21–9		
October 28	2:00 pm	No. 1 Southwest Texas State	No. 7	Memorial Stadium; Commerce, TX	W 32–29		
November 4	2:00 p.m.	at Sul Ross	No. 4	Jackson Field; Alpine, TX	L 14–15		
November 11	6:00 p.m.	No. 14 Angelo State	No. 6	Memorial Stadium; Commerce, TX	W 24–14		
November 18	2:00 p.m.	at Tarleton State	No. 5	Memorial Stadium; Stephenville, TX (rivalry)	W 27–6		
November 25	2:00 p.m.	No. 1 Central State (OK)*	No. 6	Memorial Stadium; Commerce, TX (NAIA Division I Semifinal)	W 54–0		
December 9	4:00 p.m.	No. 2 Carson–Newman*	No. 6	Memorial Stadium; Commerce, TX (Champion Bowl)	W 21–18	4,539	
*Non-conference game; Rankings from NAIA Division I Poll released prior to the game; All times are in Central time

== Awards ==
- NAIA Coach of the Year: Ernest Hawkins

=== All-Americans ===
- Harvey Martin, First Team Defensive Line
- Kenneth Parks, First Team, Running Back
- Curtis Wester, First Team, Offensive Line
- Autry Beamon, Second Team, Defensive Back
- Denver Crawley, Honorable Mention, Offensive Tackle
- Dudley Slice, Honorable Mention, Receiver
- Ricky Earle, Honorable Mention, Safety

== All-Lone Star Conference ==
=== LSC Superlatives ===
- Coach of The Year: Ernest Hawkins
- Outstanding Lineman: Curts Wester
- Outstanding Back: Kenneth Parks

=== LSC First Team ===
- Autry Beamon, Safety
- Denver Crowley, Offensive Line
- Will Cureton, Quarterback
- Ricky Earle, Safety
- Harvey Martin, Defensive End
- Kenneth Parks, Running Back
- Dudley Slice, Receiver
- Doug Walker, Linebacker
- Curtis Wester, Offensive Line

=== LSC Second Team ===
- Calvin Harris, Tight End
- LeRoy Johnson, Linebacker

=== LSC Honorable Mention ===
- Kenneth Brown, Offensive tackle
- Nelson Robinson, Fullback
- James Talbot, Linebacker
- Jim Talley, Center
- Jackie Woods, Offensive Guard
