= 1977 Troy State Trojans football team =

American college football season

1977 Troy State Trojans football
- Conference: Gulf South Conference
- Record: 6–4 (6–2 GSC)
- Head coach: Charlie Bradshaw (2nd season)
- Home stadium: Veterans Memorial Stadium

1977 Gulf South Conference football standings
	Conf.					Overall
Team	W		L		T	W		L		T
No. 9 Jacksonville State $^	7	–	1	–	0	11	–	3	–	0
Tennessee–Martin	6	–	2	–	0	8	–	3	–	0
Troy State	6	–	2	–	0	6	–	4	–	0
Southeastern Louisiana	5	–	3	–	0	6	–	4	–	0
Mississippi College	4	–	4	–	0	6	–	4	–	0
North Alabama	3	–	5	–	0	5	–	5	–	0
Delta State	3	–	5	–	0	4	–	6	–	0
Nicholls State	2	–	6	–	0	4	–	7	–	0
Livingston	1	–	7	–	0	2	–	8	–	0
$ – Conference champion; ^ – NCAA Division II playoff participant; Jacksonville State's game against Tennessee Tech, Tennessee–Martin's games against Austin Peay and Murray State, Troy State's game against Northern Michigan, Southeastern Louisiana's game against Sam Houston State, Mississippi College's game against Ouachita Baptist, North Alabama's game against Austin Peay, Nicholls State's games against Cameron and Austin Peay, and Livingston's game against Alabama State were designated as conference games and counted in the Gulf South standings.; Rankings from AP Poll

The 1977 Troy State Trojans football team represented Troy State University (now known as Troy University) as a member of the Gulf South Conference (GSC) during the 1977 NCAA Division II football season. Led by second-year head coach Charlie Bradshaw, the Trojans compiled an overall record of 6–4 with a mark of 6–2 in conference play, and finished tied for second in the GSC.

== Schedule ==
Date	Opponent	Rank	Site	Result	Attendance	Source
September 3	vs. Southern Miss*		Cramton Bowl; Montgomery, AL	L 19–42	12,550	
September 17	at UNLV*		Las Vegas Silver Bowl; Whitney, NV	L 28–35	13,424	
September 24	Nicholls State		Veterans Memorial Stadium; Troy, AL	W 23–6	6,500	
October 1	at Livingston		Tiger Stadium; Livingston, AL	W 10–0	4,000	
October 8	Southeastern Louisiana		Veterans Memorial Stadium; Troy, AL	W 17–15	7,000	
October 15	at Delta State		Delta Field; Cleveland, MS	W 10–7	2,000	
October 22	North Alabama		Veterans Memorial Stadium; Troy, AL	W 34–27	9,000	
October 29	at No. 3 Northern Michigan (Note: Troy State's game against Northern Michigan was designated as a conference game and counted in the Gulf South standings.)		Memorial Field; Marquette, MI	W 49–28	11,020	
November 5	at Mississippi College	No. 9	Robinson Field; Clinton, MS	L 15–17	5,781	
November 12	Jacksonville State		Veterans Memorial Stadium; Troy, AL (rivalry)	L 9–17	10,000	
*Non-conference game; Rankings from AP Poll released prior to the game
