= 1972 Florence State Lions football team =

American college football season

1972 Florence State Lions football
- Conference: Gulf South Conference
- Record: 2–9 (1–5 GSC)
- Head coach: Durell Mock (3rd season)
- Offensive coordinator: Harlon Hill (1st season)
- Defensive coordinator: Wally Burnham (1st season)
- Home stadium: Braly Municipal Stadium

1972 Gulf South Conference football standings
	Conf.					Overall
Team	W		L		T	W		L		T
No. 5 Northwestern State $	6	–	0	–	0	8	–	2	–	0
No. 3 Livingston ^	5	–	1	–	0	8	–	1	–	2
No. 19 Jacksonville State	4	–	1	–	1	7	–	2	–	1
Delta State	5	–	2	–	0	7	–	3	–	1
Troy State	2	–	3	–	1	4	–	5	–	1
Southeastern Louisiana	2	–	4	–	0	4	–	7	–	0
Nicholls State	1	–	5	–	0	3	–	8	–	0
Florence State	1	–	5	–	0	2	–	9	–	0
Tennessee–Martin	1	–	5	–	0	1	–	9	–	0
Mississippi College *	0	–	0	–	0	4	–	5	–	1
$ – Conference champion; ^ – NAIA Division I playoff participant * – Did not compete for conference title; Rankings from NAIA Division I poll

The 1972 Florence State Lions football team represented Florence State University as a member of the Gulf South Conference (GSC) during the 1972 NAIA Division I football season. Led by third-year head coach Durell Mock, the Lions compiled an overall record of 2–9 with a mark of 1–5 in conference play, tying for seventh place in the GSC. Florence State played home game at Braly Municipal Stadium in Florence, Alabama. Mock resigned after the conclusion of the season, having guided the Lions to an 8–24 record in his three-year tenure.

== Schedule ==
Date	Time	Opponent	Site	Result	Attendance	Source
September 9	7:30 p.m.	at Middle Tennessee*	Horace Jones Field; Murfreesboro, TN	L 10–31	10,000	
September 16	7:30 p.m.	Samford*	Braly Municipal Stadium; Florence, AL	L 10–24	6,000	
September 23	7:30 p.m.	at Delta State	Delta Field; Cleveland, MS	W 17–7	5,000	
September 30	7:30 p.m.	at Livingston	Tiger Stadium; Livingston, AL (rivalry)	L 6–17	4,000	
October 7	7:30 p.m.	at Mississippi College*	Clinton, MS	L 6–14	4,000	
October 14	7:30 p.m.	Northwestern State	Braly Municipal Stadium; Florence, AL	L 7–14	6,000	
October 21	7:30 p.m.	Troy State	Braly Municipal Stadium; Florence, AL	L 0–33	3,500	
October 28	2:00 p.m.	Henderson State*^{†}	Braly Municipal Stadium; Florence, AL	W 21–0	5,000	
November 4	1:30 p.m.	at Appaachian State*	Conrad Stadium; Boone, NC	L 3–17	5,000	
November 11	1:30 p.m.	Tennessee–Martin	Braly Municipal Stadium; Florence, AL	L 16–21	3,000	
November 18	2:00 p.m.	Jacksonville State	Paul Snow Memorial Stadium; Jacksonville, AL	L 20–39	8,000	
*Non-conference game; ^{†}Homecoming

== Offseason ==
=== Background ===
The offseason before the 1972 season was highlighted by major coaching additions. Harlon Hill returned to his alma mater to become the offensive coordinator. Hill, who in his time in the NFL had won both the Rookie of the Year and the Most Valuable Player awards, made the move the full-time coaching after spending his post-playing days earning his graduate degree and becoming a principal at an elementary school in nearby Killen, Alabama.

Bobby Johns, who played at Alabama from 1965 to 1969 and won a national championship in 1965, joined the coaching staff as a defensive secondary coach. The two-time All-American would also be responsible for recruiting in central Alabama and Georgia.

== Personnel ==
=== Roster ===
1972 Florence State Lions Football
Quarterbacks: Randy Elmore - Senior (6'1, 185); David Elmore - Sophomore (6'1, 185); Eddie Mitchell - Freshman (6'0, 170); Tim Stewart - Freshman (6'2, 185); Raymond Weaver - Sophomore (6'2, 190); Tailbacks: Larry Brom - Junior (5'10, 185); Tommy McMinn - Sophomore (6'0, 180); Jim Satterfield - Freshman (6'2, 205); Fullbacks: Mike Wilburn - Junior (5'8, 183); Jerry Mizell - Freshman (5'11, 210); Scotty King - Junior (6'0, 195); Flankerbacks: Jim Trimble - Senior (6'1, 175); Bobby Burcham - Senior (6'0, 175); Tim Weigart - Freshman (5'10, 165); Punters: Dave Mathis - Sophomore (6'2, 190)	Ends: Leroy Baker - Senior (6'1, 220); Danny Kimble - Junior (5'10, 180); Billy Hargrove - Sophomore (5'11, 185); Bill Strain - Sophomore (6'2, 195); Roger Ferrell - Freshman (6'2, 195); Will Fuller - Freshman (6'2, 180); David Gargis - Freshman (6'2, 185); Larry Jackson - Freshman (6'2, 175); Mike Knight - Freshman (6'0, 175); Frankie Williams - Freshman (6'0, 190); Tackles: Frankie Patterson - Senior (5'10, 215); Wendell Hathorn - Junior (5'11, 225); Larry Brown - Sophomore (6'0, 215); Mike Nave - Sophomore (6'1, 225); Tommy Baker - Freshman (6'1, 210); Al Carter - Freshman (6'2, 250); Barry Johnson - Freshman (6'3, 265); Sony Mitchell - Junior (6'2, 210); Tim Tortorice - Junior (6'2, 225)	Guards: Bill Morton - Junior (5'10, 220); David Harbin - Sophomore (6'0, 245); Barry Koehn - Freshman (5'11, 195); Mike Mann - Freshman (5'11, 200); Mike McDonald - Freshman (6'1, 245); Terry Rhodes - Freshman (6'1, 210); John Trotter - Sophomore (5'10, 210); Mike Warren - Freshman (6'0, 215); Centers: Paul Parvin - Sophomore (6'1, 230); Guy Fry - Freshman (6'2, 190); Linebackers: William McCormmack - Senior (6'2, 210); Hezzie Morgan - Junior (6'0, 195); Doyce Steele - Sophomore (6'1, 190); Terry Buchanan - Junior (6'0, 190); Ivan Richard - Freshman (5'11, 180); Defensive backs: David Hines - Sophomore (5'11, 185); Larry Jefferys - Sophomore (5'10, 175); Jim Witt - Sophomore (5'11, 175); Jim Ezell - Freshman (5'10, 167); Bobby Gauntey - Freshman (6'0, 170); Billy Miles - Freshman (6'2, 180)

=== Coaching staff ===
Florence State Lions coaches

Head coach

- Durell Mock

Assistant coaches

- Harlon Hill - Offensive Coordinator
- Wally Burnham - Defensive Coordinator
- Bobby Johns - Defensive Secondary Coach
- Ricky Lindsey - Graduate Assistant
- Dale Hancock - Graduate Assistant
- Bill Pike - Trainer
- Johnny Long - Graduate Assistant/Trainer
