= 1977 Jacksonville State Gamecocks football team =

American college football season

1977 Jacksonville State Gamecocks football

GSC champion

NCAA Division II Championship Game—Pioneer Bowl, L 0–33 vs. Lehigh
- Conference: Gulf South Conference
- Record: 11–3 (7–1 GSC)
- Head coach: Jim Fuller (1st season)
- Offensive coordinator: Watson Brown (1st season)
- Defensive coordinator: Bill Shaw (1st season)
- Home stadium: Paul Snow Stadium

1977 Gulf South Conference football standings
| | Conf. | | | | | Overall |
| Team | W | | L | | T | W | | L | | T |
|---|---|---|---|---|---|---|---|---|---|---|
| No. 9 Jacksonville State $^ | 7 | – | 1 | – | 0 | 11 | – | 3 | – | 0 |
| Tennessee–Martin | 6 | – | 2 | – | 0 | 8 | – | 3 | – | 0 |
| Troy State | 6 | – | 2 | – | 0 | 6 | – | 4 | – | 0 |
| Southeastern Louisiana | 5 | – | 3 | – | 0 | 6 | – | 4 | – | 0 |
| Mississippi College | 4 | – | 4 | – | 0 | 6 | – | 4 | – | 0 |
| North Alabama | 3 | – | 5 | – | 0 | 5 | – | 5 | – | 0 |
| Delta State | 3 | – | 5 | – | 0 | 4 | – | 6 | – | 0 |
| Nicholls State | 2 | – | 6 | – | 0 | 4 | – | 7 | – | 0 |
| Livingston | 1 | – | 7 | – | 0 | 2 | – | 8 | – | 0 |
$ – Conference champion; ^ – NCAA Division II playoff participant; Jacksonville State's game against Tennessee Tech, Tennessee–Martin's games against Austin Peay and Murray State, Troy State's game against Northern Michigan, Southeastern Louisiana's game against Sam Houston State, Mississippi College's game against Ouachita Baptist, North Alabama's game against Austin Peay, Nicholls State's games against Cameron and Austin Peay, and Livingston's game against Alabama State were designated as conference games and counted in the Gulf South standings.; Rankings from AP Poll

The 1977 Jacksonville State Gamecocks football team represented Jacksonville State University as a member of the Gulf South Conference (GSC) during the 1977 NCAA Division II football season. Led by first-year head coach Jim Fuller, the Gamecocks compiled an overall record of 11–3 with a mark of 7–1 in conference play, and finished as GSC champion. In the playoffs, Jacksonville State advanced to the Championship Game where they were defeated by Lehigh.

== Schedule ==
| Date | Opponent | Rank | Site | Result | Attendance | Source |
|---|---|---|---|---|---|---|
| September 3 | Western Carolina* | | Paul Snow Stadium; Jacksonville, AL | W 21–16 | 8,200 | |
| September 10 | Alabama A&M* | | Paul Snow Stadium; Jacksonville, AL | W 34–0 | 7,800 | |
| September 17 | at Nicholls State | | John L. Guidry Stadium; Thibodaux, LA | W 10–7 | 9,700 | |
| September 24 | Tennessee–Martin | No. 5 | Paul Snow Stadium; Jacksonville, AL | W 36–13 | 10,000 | |
| October 1 | at Southeastern Louisiana | No. 4 | Strawberry Stadium; Hammond, LA | W 14–10 | 7,500 | |
| October 8 | at No. T–10 Tennessee Tech (Note: Jacksonville State's game against Tennessee Tech was designated as a conference game and counted in the Gulf South standings.) | No. 3 | Tucker Stadium; Cookeville, TN | L 20–27 | 7,500 | |
| October 22 | Chattanooga* | No. 9 | Paul Snow Stadium; Jacksonville, AL | L 14–18 | 8,500 | |
| October 29 | at Delta State | | Delta Field; Cleveland, MS | W 16–13 | 1,200 | |
| November 5 | Livingston^{†} | | Paul Snow Stadium; Jacksonville, AL | W 44–7 | 10,000 | |
| November 12 | at Troy State | | Veterans Memorial Stadium; Troy, AL (rivalry) | W 17–9 | 10,000 | |
| November 19 | at North Alabama | No. 9 | Braly Municipal Stadium; Florence, AL | W 24–20 | 7,500 | |
| November 26 | at No. T–5 Northern Arizona* | No. 9 | NAU Ensphere; Flagstaff, AZ (NCAA Division II Quarterfinal) | W 35–0 | 7,500 | |
| December 3 | vs. No. 1 North Dakota State* | No. 9 | Anniston Memorial Stadium; Anniston, AL (Grantland Rice Bowl—NCAA Division II Semifinal) | W 31–7 | 9,000 | |
| December 10 | vs. No. 8 Lehigh | No. 9 | Memorial Stadium; Wichita Falls, TX (Pioneer Bowl—NCAA Division II Championship Game) | L 0–33 | 14,114 | |
*Non-conference game; ^{†}Homecoming; Rankings from AP Poll released prior to the game
