= UT Arlington Mavericks football =

- First season: 1919
- Last season: 1985
- Location: Arlington, Texas
- Stadium: Maverick Stadium (capacity: 15,000)
- NCAA division: Division I-AA
- Conference: Southland Conference
- Colors: Royal blue, white, and orange
- All-time record: 129–150–2 (.463)
- Bowl record: 1–0 (1.000)

Conference championships
- 3 (1966, 1967, 1981)
- Rivalries: Lamar Cardinals, North Texas Mean Green

The UT Arlington Mavericks football team represented the University of Texas at Arlington from the 1959 through 1985 seasons. Between 1919 through 1958, UTA competed as a junior college prior to moving to the NCAA College Division in 1959 and ultimately the University Division in 1971. UTA played its home games at multiple stadiums throughout their history with the most recent being Maverick Stadium, in Arlington, Texas.

== History ==
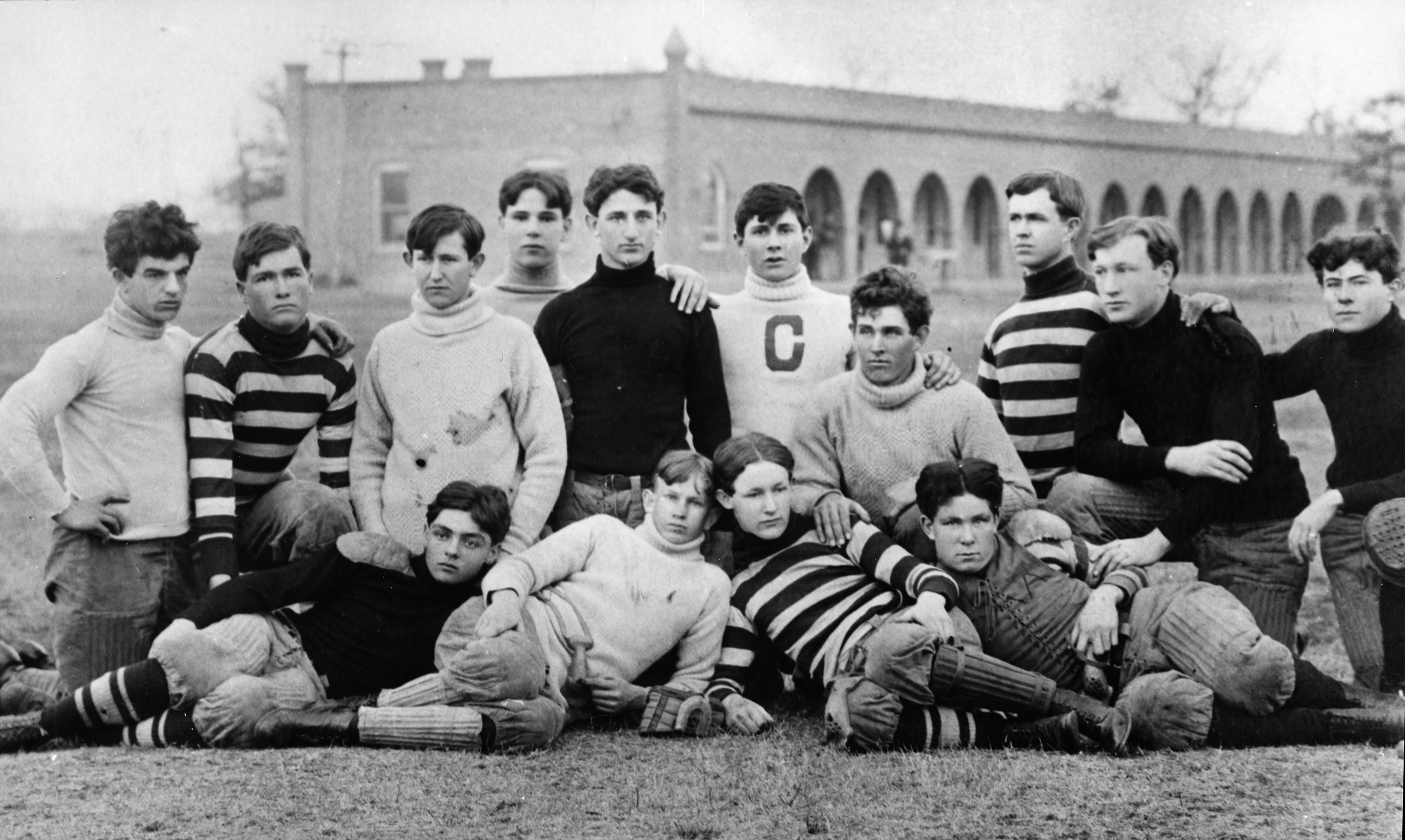
Carlisle Military Academy football team, circa 1906-1907

The UT Arlington football team traces its roots to 1919 when the program was established at Grubbs Vocational College. By 1923, Grubbs was renamed as the North Texas Agricultural College with the football team then playing as the Junior Aggies competing in the Central Texas Conference. As the Aggies, the program captured four conference championships through the 1948 season. The 1943 North Texas Aggies football team was ranked at No. 69 among the nation's college and military service teams in the final 1943 Litkenhous Ratings.

By 1949, the school changed its name and mascot again, competing as the Arlington State Blue Riders through the 1950 season only to once more change the mascot to the Rebels for the 1951 season. Arlington would reach their zenith as a junior college program in capturing both the 1956 and 1957 Junior Rose Bowls as national junior college champions. Following the 1958 season, Arlington State became a four-year school and begin competition as a College Division school.

After founding the Southland Conference as a charter member for the 1964 season, by 1966, the school officially became the University of Texas at Arlington. UTA won conference championships in 1966, 1967 and 1981 seasons in addition to winning their lone bowl game, the 1967 Pecan Bowl. The program would be officially disbanded after an announcement by then university president Wendell Nedderman on November 25, 1985, citing financial loss and low attendance as the primary impetus for its abandonment.

Despite the team's disbandment, the UTA Maverick Marching Band was determined to stay intact. They shifted focus to performing at various contests and events around the state and remain one of the only college marching bands in the United States to stand alone without a football program.

In 2023, the UTA students voted on a non-binding referendum which gauged student support for the return of football resulting in increased student fees. The referendum passed 1,004 in favor to 625 opposed. It was noted at the time that the school would need to add a women's sport to go with football to comply with Title IX regulations along with needing to raise money to build a new stadium and annual operating expenses of at least $3 million per year.

== Seasons ==
This listing includes only the seasons UTA competed as a four-year college beginning with the 1959 season.

Conference champions *	Bowl game berth ^

Season	Head coach	Conference	Season results				Bowl result
Season	Head coach	Conference	Conference finish	Wins	Losses	Ties	Bowl result
Arlington State Rebels
1959	Chena Gilstrap	Independent	—	4	3	0	—
1960	Chena Gilstrap	Independent	—	9	2	0	—
1961	Chena Gilstrap	NCAA College Division independent	—	7	3	0	—
1962	Chena Gilstrap	NCAA College Division independent	—	4	6	0	—
1963	Chena Gilstrap	NCAA College Division independent	—	1	8	0	—
1964	Chena Gilstrap	Southland Conference	5th	3	6	1	—
1965	Chena Gilstrap	Southland Conference	2nd	6	3	0	—
1966 *	Burley Bearden	Southland Conference	1st	6	4	0	—
UT Arlington Rebels
1967 *	Burley Bearden	Southland Conference	1st	10	1	0	Won 1967 Pecan Bowl against North Dakota State Bison, 13–0 ^
1968	Burley Bearden	Southland Conference	2nd	6	4	0	—
1969	Burley Bearden	Southland Conference	3rd	5	5	0	—
1970	Burley Bearden	Southland Conference	5th	0	10	0	—
UT Arlington Mavericks
1971	John Symank	Southland Conference	7th	2	9	0	—
1972	John Symank	Southland Conference	2nd	5	6	0	—
1973	John Symank	Southland Conference	5th	4	6	0	—
1974	Harold Elliott	Southland Conference	5th	1	10	0	—
1975	Harold Elliott	Southland Conference	5th	4	7	0	—
1976	Harold Elliott	Southland Conference	3rd	5	6	0	—
1977	Harold Elliott	Southland Conference	3rd	5	6	0	—
1978	Harold Elliott	Southland Conference	3rd	5	6	0	—
1979	Harold Elliott	Southland Conference	2nd	9	2	0	—
1980	Harold Elliott	Southland Conference	3rd	3	8	0	—
1981 *	Harold Elliott	Southland Conference	1st	6	5	0	—
1982	Harold Elliott	Southland Conference	6th	3	8	0	—
1983	Harold Elliott	Southland Conference	5th	5	6	0	—
1984	Chuck Curtis	Southland Conference	3rd	7	4	0	—
1985	Chuck Curtis	Southland Conference	6th	4	6	1	—
Total				128	150	2	(only includes regular season games)
Total				1	0	0	(only includes bowl games)
Total				129	150	2	(all games)

== Stadiums ==
- Memorial Stadium, 1959–1969
- Turnpike Stadium, 1970–1976
- Cravens Field, 1977–1979
- Maverick Stadium, 1980–1985
