= 1977 Nicholls State Colonels football team =

American college football season

1977 Nicholls State Colonels football
- Conference: Gulf South Conference
- Record: 4–7 (2–6 GSC)
- Head coach: Bill Clements (4th season)
- Home stadium: John L. Guidry Stadium

1977 Gulf South Conference football standings
	Conf.					Overall
Team	W		L		T	W		L		T
No. 9 Jacksonville State $^	7	–	1	–	0	11	–	3	–	0
Tennessee–Martin	6	–	2	–	0	8	–	3	–	0
Troy State	6	–	2	–	0	6	–	4	–	0
Southeastern Louisiana	5	–	3	–	0	6	–	4	–	0
Mississippi College	4	–	4	–	0	6	–	4	–	0
North Alabama	3	–	5	–	0	5	–	5	–	0
Delta State	3	–	5	–	0	4	–	6	–	0
Nicholls State	2	–	6	–	0	4	–	7	–	0
Livingston	1	–	7	–	0	2	–	8	–	0
$ – Conference champion; ^ – NCAA Division II playoff participant; Jacksonville State's game against Tennessee Tech, Tennessee–Martin's games against Austin Peay and Murray State, Troy State's game against Northern Michigan, Southeastern Louisiana's game against Sam Houston State, Mississippi College's game against Ouachita Baptist, North Alabama's game against Austin Peay, Nicholls State's games against Cameron and Austin Peay, and Livingston's game against Alabama State were designated as conference games and counted in the Gulf South standings.; Rankings from AP Poll

The 1977 Nicholls State Colonels football team represented Nicholls State University as a member of the Gulf South Conference (GSC) the 1977 NCAA Division II football season. Led by fourth-year head coach Bill Clements, the Colonels compiled an overall record of 4–7 with a conference mark of 2–6, placing eighth in the GSC. Nicholls State played home games at John L. Guidry Stadium in Thibodaux, Louisiana.

== Schedule ==
Date	Opponent	Site	Result	Attendance	Source
September 10	at Mississippi College	Robinson Stadium; Clinton, MS	W 6–0	4,236	
September 17	Jacksonville State	John L. Guidry Stadium; Thibodaux, LA	L 7–10	9,700	
September 24	at Troy State	Veterans Memorial Stadium; Troy, AL	L 6–23	6,500	
October 1	at Cameron (Note: Nicholls State's games against Cameron and Austin Peay were designated as conference games and counted in the Gulf South standings.)	Cameron Stadium; Lawton, OK	L 0–13	6,000	
October 8	Northwestern State*	John L. Guidry Stadium; Thibodaux, LA (rivalry)	W 10–6	6,379	
October 15	Tennessee–Martin	John L. Guidry Stadium; Thibodaux, LA	L 0–34	3,051	
October 22	at Austin Peay	Municipal Stadium; Clarksville, TN	W 15–13	7,100	
October 29	at McNeese State*	Cowboy Stadium; Lake Charles, LA	W 24–7	17,725	
November 5	at Northeast Louisiana*	Brown Stadium; Monroe, LA	L 2–19	7,300	
November 12	Southeastern Louisiana	John L. Guidry Stadium; Thibodaux, LA (rivalry)	L 14–17	4,124	
November 19	Delta State	John L. Guidry Stadium; Thibodaux, LA	L 0–14	1,155	
*Non-conference game; Source:
