= 1972 Abilene Christian Wildcats football team =

American college football season

1972 Abilene Christian Wildcats football
- Conference: Southland Conference
- Record: 3–8 (1–5 Southland)
- Head coach: Wally Bullington (5th season)
- Home stadium: Shotwell Stadium

1972 Southland Conference football standings
	Conf.					Overall
Team	W		L		T	W		L		T
No. 2 Louisiana Tech $	5	–	0	–	0	12	–	0	–	0
UT Arlington	4	–	1	–	0	5	–	6	–	0
No. T–10 McNeese State	3	–	2	–	0	8	–	3	–	0
Lamar	3	–	2	–	0	8	–	3	–	0
SW Louisiana	1	–	4	–	0	5	–	6	–	0
Arkansas State	1	–	4	–	0	4	–	7	–	0
Abilene Christian	1	–	5	–	0	3	–	8	–	0
$ – Conference champion; Rankings from AP small college poll

The 1972 Abilene Christian Wildcats football team was an American football team that represented Abilene Christian College (now known as Abilene Christian University) in the Southland Conference during the 1972 NCAA College Division football season. In their fifth year under head coach Wally Bullington, the team compiled a 3–8 record.

== Schedule ==
Date	Time	Opponent	Site	Result	Attendance	Source
September 9		East Texas State*	Shotwell Stadium; Abilene, TX	W 14–12	6,325	
September 16		at Angelo State*	San Angelo Stadium; San Angelo, TX	L 27–35	8,512	
September 23		Southeastern Louisiana*	Shotwell Stadium; Abilene, TX	L 10–14	7,012	
September 30		at No. 2 Louisiana Tech	Louisiana Tech Stadium; Ruston, LA	L 12–35	13,500	
October 7		at Southwestern Louisiana	Cajun Field; Lafayette, LA	L 14–35	10,650	
October 14		at Lamar	Cardinal Stadium; Beaumont, TX	L 10–31	10,807	
October 21		Arkansas State	Shotwell Stadium; Abilene, TX	W 3–0	7,200	
October 28		at Eastern New Mexico*	Portales, NM	W 34–10	2,500	
November 4	7:30 p.m.	UT Arlington	Shotwell Stadium; Abilene, TX	L 22–36	8,000	
November 11		at Sam Houston State*	Pritchett Field; Huntsville, TX	L 16–17	2,000	
November 18		at No. 9 McNeese State	Cowboy Stadium; Lake Charles, LA	L 0–22	8,750	
*Non-conference game; Rankings from AP Poll released prior to the game; All times are in Central time
