= 1972 Southwestern Louisiana Bulldogs football team =

American college football season

1972 Southwestern Louisiana Bulldogs football
- Conference: Southland Conference
- Record: 5–6 (1–4 Southland)
- Head coach: Russ Faulkinberry (12th season)
- Home stadium: Cajun Field

1972 Southland Conference football standings
	Conf.					Overall
Team	W		L		T	W		L		T
No. 2 Louisiana Tech $	5	–	0	–	0	12	–	0	–	0
UT Arlington	4	–	1	–	0	5	–	6	–	0
No. T–10 McNeese State	3	–	2	–	0	8	–	3	–	0
Lamar	3	–	2	–	0	8	–	3	–	0
SW Louisiana	1	–	4	–	0	5	–	6	–	0
Arkansas State	1	–	4	–	0	4	–	7	–	0
Abilene Christian	1	–	5	–	0	3	–	8	–	0
$ – Conference champion; Rankings from AP small college poll

The 1972 Southwestern Louisiana Bulldogs football team was an American football team that represented the University of Southwestern Louisiana (now known as the University of Louisiana at Lafayette) in the Southland Conference during the 1972 NCAA College Division football season. In their twelfth year under head coach Russ Faulkinberry, the team compiled an 5–6 record.

== Schedule ==
Date	Time	Opponent	Site	Result	Attendance	Source
September 9		at Louisiana Tech	Cajun Field; Lafayette, LA (rivalry)	L 0–7	21,707	
September 16		Southeastern Louisiana*	Cajun Field; Lafayette, LA (Cypress Mug)	W 30–7		
September 23		at Trinity (TX)*	E. M. Stevens Stadium; San Antonio, TX	L 10–13		
September 30		Arkansas State	Cajun Field; Lafayette, LA	L 18–21	12,456	
October 7		Abilene Christian	Cajun Field; Lafayette, LA	W 35–14	10,650	
October 14		at Chattanooga*	Chamberlain Field; Chattanooga, TN	W 22–21	7,500	
October 21		Lamar	Cajun Field; Lafayette, LA (Sabine Shoe)	L 0–3	14,772	
October 28	7:30 p.m.	at UT Arlington	Arlington Stadium; Arlington, TX	L 0–7	1,500	
November 4		Santa Clara*	Cajun Field; Lafayette, LA	W 27–7	20,000	
November 11		at Northwestern State*	Demon Stadium; Natchitoches, LA	L 8–24	7,100	
November 25		at McNeese State	Cowboy Stadium; Lake Charles, LA (Cajun Crown)	W 10–0	14,000	
*Non-conference game; All times are in Central time
