= Darren Barbier =

American football player and coach (born 1960)

Biographical details
- Born: December 19, 1960 (age 65); New Orleans, Louisiana, U.S.

Playing career

Baseball
- 1978–1981: Nicholls State

Coaching career (HC unless noted)

Football
- 1983–1988: Archbishop Shaw HS (LA) (assistant)
- 1989–1994: Hahnville HS (LA)
- 1995–1998: Nicholls State
- 1999: Tulane (DB)
- 2000–2002: De La Salle HS (LA)

Head coaching record
- Overall: 17–28 (college); 64–12 (high school)
- Tournaments: 0–1 (NCAA D-I-AA playoffs)

Accomplishments and honors

Awards
- Eddie Robinson Award (1996)

Darren Barbier (born December 19, 1960) is an American former football coach. He served as the head football at Nicholls State University from 1995 to 1998, compiling a record of 17–28.

== Playing career ==
Barbier is a former baseball player at Nicholls State University.

== Coaching career ==
=== High school career ===
Barbier began his coaching career as an assistant at his alma mater, Archbishop Shaw High School in Marrero, Louisiana from 1983 to 1988. His first head coaching position was at Hahnville High School in Boutte, Louisiana from 1989 to 1994 where he won two LHSAA state championships in 1992 and 1994. In 2000, Barbier returned to the high school coaching ranks as head football coach at De La Salle High School in New Orleans; a position he held through the 2002 season.

=== College career ===
Barbier served as the head football coach at Nicholls State University from 1995 to 1998, compiling a record of 17 wins and 28 losses. Barbier was given the Eddie Robinson Award in 1996 as the top coach in NCAA Division I-AA football when he guided the Colonels to an 8–4 record and a berth in the NCAA Division I-AA playoffs, where his team lost their first-round game. The 1996 turnaround came one season after Nicholls State finished 0–11 and in last place in the Southland Conference.

In 1999, Barbier served as defensive backs coach at Tulane University.

== Head coaching record ==
=== College ===
Year	Team	Overall	Conference	Standing	Bowl/playoffs	TSN^{#}
Nicholls State Colonels (Southland Conference) (1995–1998)
1995	Nicholls State	0–11	0–5	6th		
1996	Nicholls State	8–4	4–2	2nd	L NCAA Division I-AA First Round	19
1997	Nicholls State	5–6	3–4	T–4th		
1998	Nicholls State	4–7	3–4	5th		
Nicholls State:		17–28	10–15			
Total:		17–28				
^{#}The Sports Network FCS final poll.
