= Bill Clements (American football) =

American football player and coach

Playing career
- 1957–1959: Tulane

Coaching career (HC unless noted)
- 1962–1970: Holy Cross HS (LA) (DC)
- 1971: Nicholls State (Club football) (DC)
- 1972–1973: Nicholls State (DC)
- 1974–1980: Nicholls State

Head coaching record
- Overall: 36–39–1

Accomplishments and honors

Championships
- 1 Gulf South (1975)

William Clements is an American former football player and coach. He served as the head football coach at Nicholls State University from 1974 to 1980.

== Playing career ==
Clements is an alumnus of Tulane University where he played for the Green Wave from 1957 to 1959.

== Coaching career ==
=== High school career ===
From 1962 to 1970, Clements was the defensive coordinator at Holy Cross High School in New Orleans.

=== College career ===
During the 1971 season, Clements was defensive coordinator for the Nicholls State University club football team while it transitioned to varsity football. He continued in that role in 1972 and 1973 as part of the varsity coaching staff.

From 1974 to 1980, Clements served as head football coach at Nicholls State University compiling a record of 36 wins, 39 losses and 1 tie. In 1975, he guided Nicholls State to both its first winning season and conference championship in team history.

== Head coaching record ==
Year	Team	Overall	Conference	Standing	Bowl/playoffs
Nicholls State Colonels (Gulf South Conference) (1974–1978)
1974	Nicholls State	5–6	4–5	7th	
1975	Nicholls State	8–2	7–2	1st	
1976	Nicholls State	4–6–1	2–5–1	T–7th	
1977	Nicholls State	4–7	2–6	8th	
1978	Nicholls State	5–6	5–2	T–3rd	
Nicholls State Colonels (NCAA Division II independent) (1979)
1979	Nicholls State	8–3			
Nicholls State Colonels (NCAA Division I-AA independent) (1980)
1980	Nicholls State	2–9			
Nicholls State:		36–39–1	20–20–1		
Total:		36–39–1			
National championship Conference title Conference division title or championship game berth
