= Gary Kinchen =

American football player and coach (1941–2011)

Biographical details
- Born: January 13, 1941; Albany, Louisiana, U.S.
- Died: August 17, 2011 (aged 70); Baton Rouge, Louisiana, U.S.

Playing career
- 1960–1962: LSU
- Position: Center

Coaching career (HC unless noted)
- 1963–1964: Glen Oaks HS (LA) (assistant)
- 1965: Glen Oaks HS (LA)
- 1966: Southwestern Louisiana (assistant)
- 1967–1968: Tulane (assistant)
- 1969–1970: Rice (OL/DL)
- 1972–1973: Nicholls State

Head coaching record
- Overall: 5–17 (college)

Ronald Gary Kinchen (January 13, 1941 – August 17, 2011) was an American football player and coach. He served as the head football coach at Nicholls State University from 1972 to 1973, compiling a record of 5–17.

== Playing career ==
Kinchen was an alumnus of the Louisiana State University (LSU), where he played college football as a center and lettered for the LSU Tigers from 1960 to 1962.

== Coaching career ==
=== High school career ===
Kinchen was an assistant coach at Glen Oaks High School in Baton Rouge, Louisiana from 1963 to 1964 and head coach in 1965.

=== College career ===
In 1966 to 1967, Kinchen was athletic director, and head football and baseball coach at Glen Oaks High School in Baton Rouge

From 1967 to 1968, he was an assistant at Tulane University. Starting in 1969 through 1970, Kinchen was offensive line/defensive line coach at Rice University

In 1972, Kinchen was named the first head football coach at Nicholls State University. He coached through the 1973 season and finished with a record of 5–17 at Nicholls State.

== Head coaching record ==
=== College ===
Year	Team	Overall	Conference	Standing	Bowl/playoffs
Nicholls State Colonels (Gulf South Conference) (1972–1973)
1972	Nicholls State	3–8	1–5	T–7th	
1973	Nicholls State	2–9	2–7	9th	
Nicholls State:		5–17	3–12		
Total:		5–17			
