= Charlie Stubbs (American football) =

American college football coach (born 1955)

Biographical details
- Born: September 2, 1955 (age 71); Charleston, South Carolina, U.S.
- Education: Brigham Young University

Coaching career (HC unless noted)
- 1981–1982: Sea Island Academy (SC)
- 1983–1984: BYU (GA)
- 1985–1987: Oregon State (WR)
- 1988: Oregon State (QB)
- 1989–1990: Oregon State (OC)
- 1991–1993: Boiling Springs HS (SC)
- 1994: Memphis (OC/QB)
- 1995: Tennessee–Martin (OC/QB)
- 1996–1997: UNLV (OC/QB)
- 1998–2000: Alabama (PGC/QB)
- 2002–2006: Tulsa (OC/QB)
- 2007: Louisville (OC/WR)
- 2008–2009: Central Missouri (OC/QB)
- 2010–2014: Nicholls State
- 2016: Oceanside Collegiate Academy (SC)

Head coaching record
- Overall: 10–38 (college)

Charlie Stubbs (born September 2, 1955) is an American college football coach. He served as head football coach at Nicholls State University from 2010 to 2014, compiling an overall record of ten wins and 38 losses. Stubbs resigned on September 14, 2014, citing health issues for his decision.

Stubbs is an alumnus of Brigham Young University (BYU). He has also been an assistant at BYU (graduate assistant), Oregon State (wide receivers/offensive coordinator/quarterbacks coach), Memphis (offensive coordinator/quarterbacks coach), Tennessee-Martin (offensive coordinator/quarterbacks coach), UNLV (offensive coordinator/quarterbacks coach), Alabama (passing game coordinator/quarterbacks coach), Tulsa (offensive coordinator/quarterbacks coach), Louisville (offensive coordinator/wide receivers coach) and Central Missouri (offensive coordinator/quarterbacks coach).

Stubbs has published three books throughout his career: Wide Open Football, Developing an Explosive Offense, and his most recent, 101 Playmakers and Special Plays.

== Head coaching record ==
Year	Team	Overall	Conference	Standing	Bowl/playoffs
Nicholls State Colonels (Southland Conference) (2010–2014)
2010	Nicholls State	4–7	3–4	6th	
2011	Nicholls State	1–10	0–7	8th	
2012	Nicholls State	1–10	0–7	8th	
2013	Nicholls State	4–8	1–6	T–7th	
2014	Nicholls State	0–3	0–0	11th	
Nicholls State:		10–38	4–24		
Total:		10–38			
