= 1972 Nicholls State Colonels football team =

American college football season

1972 Nicholls State Colonels football
- Conference: Gulf South Conference
- Record: 3–8 (1–5 GSC)
- Head coach: Gary Kinchen (1st season)
- Home stadium: Colonel Stadium

1972 Gulf South Conference football standings
	Conf.					Overall
Team	W		L		T	W		L		T
No. 5 Northwestern State $	6	–	0	–	0	8	–	2	–	0
No. 3 Livingston ^	5	–	1	–	0	8	–	1	–	2
No. 19 Jacksonville State	4	–	1	–	1	7	–	2	–	1
Delta State	5	–	2	–	0	7	–	3	–	1
Troy State	2	–	3	–	1	4	–	5	–	1
Southeastern Louisiana	2	–	4	–	0	4	–	7	–	0
Nicholls State	1	–	5	–	0	3	–	8	–	0
Florence State	1	–	5	–	0	2	–	9	–	0
Tennessee–Martin	1	–	5	–	0	1	–	9	–	0
Mississippi College *	0	–	0	–	0	4	–	5	–	1
$ – Conference champion; ^ – NAIA Division I playoff participant * – Did not compete for conference title; Rankings from NAIA Division I poll

The 1972 Nicholls State Colonels football team represented Nicholls State University as a member of the Gulf South Conference (GSC) during the 1972 NCAA College Division football season. Led by first-year head coach Gary Kinchen, the Colonels compiled an overall record of 3–8 with a mark of 1–5 in conference play, tying for seventh place in the GSC. Nicholls State played home games at Colonel Stadium in Thibodaux, Louisiana.

== Schedule ==
Date	Opponent	Site	Result	Attendance	Source
September 9	at Jacksonville State	Paul Snow Stadium; Jacksonville, AL	L 0–31	6,000	
September 16	Ouachita Baptist*	John L. Guidry Stadium; Thibodaux, LA	W 12–7	6,000	
September 23	Slippery Rock*	John L. Guidry Stadium; Thibodaux, LA	W 18–14	6,000	
September 30	at Southeastern Louisiana	Strawberry Stadium; Hammond, LA (rivalry)	L 9–31	8,000–8,500	
October 7	Northeast Louisiana*	John L. Guidry Stadium; Thibodaux, LA	L 7–27	7,000	
October 14	Mississippi College	John L. Guidry Stadium; Thibodaux, LA	L 13–42	7,000	
October 21	McNeese State*	John L. Guidry Stadium; Thibodaux, LA	L 7–24	7,600	
October 28	at Tennessee–Martin	Pacer Stadium; Martin, TN	W 18–15	2,500	
November 4	Livingston	John L. Guidry Stadium; Thibodaux, LA	L 0–26	5,000	
November 11	at Lamar*	Cardinal Stadium; Beaumont, TX	L 15–22	8,000	
November 18	at Delta State	McCool Stadium; Cleveland, MS	L 0–42	200	
*Non-conference game; Source:
