= Sonny Jackson (American football) =

American football coach (1938–2021)

Biographical details
- Born: September 24, 1938; Texarkana, Texas, U.S.
- Died: July 10, 2021 (aged 82)
- Education: Nicholls State University

Coaching career (HC unless noted)
- 1979–1980: Northeast Louisiana (assistant)
- 1981–1986: Nicholls State
- 1987–1989: McNeese State

Head coaching record
- Overall: 52–48–1 (college)
- Tournaments: 1–1 (NCAA D-I-AA playoffs)

Accomplishments and honors

Championships
- 1 Gulf Star (1984)

William "Sonny" Jackson (September 24, 1938 – July 10, 2021) was an American college football coach. He served as the head football coach at Nicholls State University from 1981 to 1986 and at McNeese State University from 1987 to 1989.

== Coaching career ==
=== High school career ===
Prior to his college coaching career, Jackson was an assistant coach and later head football coach at St. Joseph Benedictine High School in Chauvin, Louisiana. He was also head coach at Central High School in Central, Louisiana.

=== College career ===
Jackson was an assistant coach at Northeast Louisiana University for two seasons from 1979 to 1980. In 1981, Jackson was hired for his first college head coaching position at his alma mater, Nicholls State University. He coached the Colonels for six seasons through 1986 and compiled a record of 39 wins, 28 losses and 1 tie. In 1986, he guided Nicholls State to its first appearance in the NCAA Division I-AA playoffs and led the team to their first playoff win.

From 1987 to 1989, Jackson was head football coach at McNeese State University and compiled a record of 13–20. He had a career college football coaching record of 52 wins, 48 losses and 1 tie in his nine seasons as a head coach.

== Personal life ==
Jackson was a 1963 graduate of Nicholls State University. His son, Hud Jackson, is also a college football head coach.

He died on July 10, 2021.

== Head coaching record ==
=== College ===
Year	Team	Overall	Conference	Standing	Bowl/playoffs
Nicholls State Colonels (NCAA Division I-AA independent) (1981–1983)
1981	Nicholls State	5–5–1			
1982	Nicholls State	7–4			
1983	Nicholls State	5–6			
Nicholls State Colonels (Gulf Star Conference) (1984–1986)
1984	Nicholls State	6–5	4–1	T–1st	
1985	Nicholls State	6–5	2–3	T–3rd	
1986	Nicholls State	10–3	2–2	T–2nd	L NCAA Division I-AA Quarterfinal
Nicholls State:		39–28–1	8–6		
McNeese State Cowboys (Southland Conference) (1987–1989)
1987	McNeese State	2–9	1–5	T–6th	
1988	McNeese State	6–5	3–3	4th	
1989	McNeese State	5–6	2–4	T–5th	
McNeese State:		13–20	6–12		
Total:		52–48–1			
National championship Conference title Conference division title or championship game berth
