= Phil Greco =

American football player, coach, and athletic director

Biographical details
- Born: September 30, 1948 (age 78)

Playing career
- 1968–1969: Tulane
- Position: Cornerback

Coaching career (HC unless noted)
- 1978–1980: East St. John HS (LA)
- 1981–1983: Northeast Louisiana (assistant)
- 1984: Southern Miss (assistant)
- 1985: Tulane (RB)
- 1986: Tulane (OT/TE)
- 1987–1992: Nicholls State

Administrative career (AD unless noted)
- 1987–1993: Nicholls State

Head coaching record
- Overall: 27–37–2 (college)

Phil Greco (born September 30, 1948) is an American former football coach and athletics administrator. He served as the head football at Nicholls State University from 1987 to 1992, compiling a record of 27–37–2. Greco was also the athletic director at Nicholls State from 1987 to 1993.

== Playing career ==
Greco is an alumnus of Tulane University and played football at Tulane and Delta State University.

== Coaching career ==
=== High school coaching ===
Prior to his college career, Greco was both an assistant and head football coach at the former Francis T. Nicholls High School in New Orleans, Louisiana, assistant coach at both De La Salle High School in New Orleans and Archbishop Shaw High School in Marrero, Louisiana and head football coach at East St. John High School in Reserve, Louisiana from 1978 to 1980. His 1980 team won the state championship with a 14–0 record.

=== College coaching ===
Greco was an assistant coach at Northeast Louisiana University—now known as the University of Louisiana at Monroe—from 1981 to 1983 and at the University of Southern Mississippi in 1984. In 1985, he moved to his alma mater, Tulane University, as running backs coach and then tackles/tight ends coach in 1986. Starting in 1987, Greco moved to Nicholls State University as their head football coach until 1992. He finished with a record of 27 wins, 37 losses and 2 ties at Nicholls State.

== Athletic administration ==
Greco was athletic director at Nicholls State University from 1987 to 1993 and later at Archbishop Rummel High School in Metairie, Louisiana.

== Head coaching record ==
=== College ===
| Year | Team | Overall | Conference | Standing | Bowl/playoffs |
|---|---|---|---|---|---|
Nicholls State Colonels (NCAA Division I-AA independent) (1987–1990)
| 1987 | Nicholls State | 5–5–1 | | | |
| 1988 | Nicholls State | 7–4 | | | |
| 1989 | Nicholls State | 5–6 | | | |
| 1990 | Nicholls State | 5–6 | | | |
Nicholls State Colonels (Southland Conference) (1991–1992)
| 1991 | Nicholls State | 4–7 | 2–5 | T–6th | |
| 1992 | Nicholls State | 1–9–1 | 0–6–1 | 8th | |
| Nicholls State: | | 27–37–2 | 2–11–1 | | |
| Total: | | 27–37–2 | | | |
