= 1974 San Diego Chargers season =

1974 NFL team season

- Owner: Eugene V. Klein
- General manager: Harland Svare
- Head coach: Tommy Prothro
- Home stadium: San Diego Stadium

Results
- Record: 5–9
- Division place: 4th AFC West
- Playoffs: Did not qualify
- All-Pros: None
- Pro Bowlers: 1: T Russ Washington

The 1974 San Diego Chargers season was the franchise's fifth season in the National Football League (NFL), and its 15th overall. The team improved on their 2–11–1 record in 1973 and finished 5–9. It was Tommy Prothro's first season as the team's head coach.

Before the season, the team changed from white helmets and powder blue jerseys—which it had had since its inception in 1960—to royal blue helmets and jerseys. Players' uniform numbers were also removed from the helmets, and the face mask color was changed to yellow. Previously, every team had gray face masks. (Note: In a few rare cases, individual players had changed their face mask color, but it was not done across the team.) Chargers equipment manager Sid Brooks and business manager Bob Hood first went to their face mask supplier, Riddell, but they said they could not change the color. Brooks and Hood then approached a dentist who was selling face masks under the brand name Dungard, who was able to change the color by using a dental process. Some players were still wearing old single- and double-bar masks, which Brooks painted yellow himself. The royal blue would remain through 1984, when the helmets and jerseys became a darker shade of blue (navy blue); that blue became even darker in 1988. The Chargers switched back permanently to modified white helmets in 2007.

== Offseason ==
=== NFL draft ===
1974 San Diego Chargers draft
Round	Pick	Player	Position	College	Notes
1	2	Bo Matthews	Running back	Colorado Boulder	
1	15	Don Goode	Linebacker	Kansas	
2	43	Mark Markovich	Center	Penn State	
3	59	Bill Rudder	Running back	Tennessee	
4	81	Harrison Davis	Wide receiver	Virginia	
5	105	John Teerlinck	Defensive tackle	Western Illinois	
6	133	Jesse Freitas	Quarterback	San Diego State	
8	185	Tom Forrest	Guard	Cincinnati	
8	206	Bon Boatwright	Defensive tackle	Oklahoma State	
9	210	Danny Colbert	Cornerback	Tulsa	
10	237	John Ketchoyian	Linebacker	Santa Clara	
11	262	Dave Grannell	Tight end	Arizona State University	
12	289	Sam Williams	Cornerback	California	
13	314	Brian Vertefeuille	Tackle	Idaho State	
14	341	Greg Bailey	Defensive back	Long Beach State	
15	366	Charles Anthony	Linebacker	Southern California	
15	386	Greg Meczka	Tight end	Bowling Green	
16	393	Neal Skarin	Defensive end	Arizona State	
17	418	Charles DeJurnett	Defensive tackle	San Jose State	Joined the Chargers in 1976 after initially playing in the WFL
Made roster * Made at least one Pro Bowl during career

== Roster ==
1974 San Diego Chargers roster
Quarterbacks (QB): 17 Jesse Freitas; 13 Don Horn; Running backs (RB): 21 Glen Bonner; 41 Bo Matthews; 35 Bob Thomas; 38 Tom Thompson; 33 Don Woods; Wide receivers (WR): 85 Jim Beirne; 87 Harrison Davis; 27 Gary Garrison; 25 Jerry LeVias; Tight ends (TE): 82 Dave Grannell; 80 Gary Parris; 89 Wayne Stewart	Offensive linemen (OL): 52 Jay Douglas C; 69 Ira Gordon G; 65 Mark Markovich G; 55 Carl Mauck C; 76 Terry Owens T; 62 Harold Paul T; 68 Brian Vertefeuille T; 70 Russ Washington T; 63 Doug Wilkerson G; Defensive linemen (DL): 79 Coy Bacon DE; 73 Bon Boatwright DT; 78 Bob Brown DT; 61 Blenda Gay DE; 71 Pete Lazetich DE; 74 Dave Rowe DT; 77 John Teerlinck DT/DE; 75 Dave Tipton DE	Linebackers (LB): 59 Charles Anthony MLB; 54 Carl Gersbach MLB/OLB; 50 Don Goode OLB; 53 Chip Myrtle OLB; 57 Floyd Rice OLB; 81 Jeff Staggs OLB; Defensive backs (DB): 40 Joe Beauchamp FS; 45 Reggie Berry CB/S; 46 Danny Colbert CB; 39 Lenny Dunlap CB/SS; 44 Chris Fletcher SS; 23 George Hoey FS/CB; 24 Bob Howard CB; 47 Sam Williams CB; Special teams (ST): 29 Dennis Partee P/K; 15 Ray Wersching K	Reserve: 35 Cid Edwards RB (Susp.); 14 Dan Fouts QB (IR); 26 Clinton Jones RB (IR); Rookies in italics

== Preseason ==
Week	Date	Opponent	Result	Record	Venue	Attendance
1	August 3	San Francisco 49ers	W 20–6	1–0	San Diego Stadium	
2	August 10	New York Jets	W 20–14	2–0	San Diego Stadium	
3	August 18	vs. St. Louis Cardinals	L 14–48	2–1	Husky Stadium (Seattle)	
4	August 24	New England Patriots	L 14–23	2–2	San Diego Stadium	
5	August 31	Los Angeles Rams	L 16–30	2–3	San Diego Stadium	
6	September 7	at Minnesota Vikings	L 0–42	2–4	Metropolitan Stadium	

== Regular season ==
=== Schedule ===
Week	Date	Opponent	Result	Record	Venue	Attendance	Recap
1	September 15	at Houston Oilers	**L** 14–21	0–1	Astrodome	25,317	Recap
2	September 22	at Cincinnati Bengals	**W** 20–17	1–1	Riverfront Stadium	51,178	Recap
3	September 29	Miami Dolphins	**L** 21–28	1–2	San Diego Stadium	44,706	Recap
4	October 6	Philadelphia Eagles	**L** 7–13	1–3	San Diego Stadium	36,124	Recap
5	October 13	**Oakland Raiders**	**L** 10–14	1–4	San Diego Stadium	40,539	Recap
6	October 20	at **Denver Broncos**	**L** 7–27	1–5	Mile High Stadium	50,928	Recap
7	October 27	**Kansas City Chiefs**	**L** 24–14	1–6	San Diego Stadium	34,371	Recap
8	November 3	Cleveland Browns	**W** 36–35	2–6	San Diego Stadium	35,683	Recap
9	November 10	at **Kansas City Chiefs**	**W** 14–7	3–6	Arrowhead Stadium	48,551	Recap
10	November 17	at **Oakland Raiders**	**L** 10–17	3–7	Oakland–Alameda County Coliseum	50,178	Recap
11	November 24	at Green Bay Packers	**L** 0–34	3–8	Lambeau Field	56,267	Recap
12	December 1	at New York Jets	**L** 14–27	3–9	Shea Stadium	44,888	Recap
13	December 8	Chicago Bears	**W** 28–21	4–9	San Diego Stadium	33,662	Recap
14	December 15	**Denver Broncos**	**W** 17–0	5–9	San Diego Stadium	36,571	Recap
Note: Intra-division opponents are in **bold** text.

=== Standings ===
AFC West
	W	L	T	PCT	DIV	CONF	PF	PA	STK
Oakland Raiders	12	2	0	.857	5–1	9–2	355	228	W3
Denver Broncos	7	6	1	.536	3–3	5–4–1	302	294	L1
Kansas City Chiefs	5	9	0	.357	2–4	4–7	233	293	L2
San Diego Chargers	5	9	0	.357	2–4	4–7	212	285	W2

=== Season summary ===
==== Week 1: at Houston Oilers ====
Week One: San Diego Chargers at Houston Oilers – Game summary

Quarter	1	2	3	4	Total
Chargers	0	7	7	0	**14**
**Oilers**	14	0	0	7	**21**

at Astrodome, Houston, Texas

- Date: September 15
- Game time: 1:00 p.m. CDT
- Game weather: N/A (game played indoors)
- Game attendance: 25,317
- Referee: Pat Haggerty
- TV announcers (NBC): Ross Porter and Willie Davis
- Box score

Game information

**First quarter**

- HOU – George Amundson 1-yard run (Skip Butler kick), 10:27. Oilers 7–0. **Drive: 7 plays, 67 yards, 4:33.**
- HOU – George Amundson 8-yard pass from Lynn Dickey (Skip Butler kick), 0:03. Oilers 14–0. **Drive: 12 plays, 65 yards, 5:23.**

**Second quarter**

- SDG – Glen Bonner 3-yard run (Dennis Partee kick), 1:23. Oilers 14–7. **Drive: 7 plays, 40 yards, 3:24.**

**Third quarter**

- SDG – Gary Garrison 29-yard pass from Dan Fouts (Dennis Partee kick), 13:07. Tied 14–14. **Drive: 4 plays, 65 yards, 1:53.**

**Fourth quarter**

- HOU – George Amundson 3-yard run (Skip Butler kick), 13:20. Oilers 21–14. **Drive: 7 plays, 58 yards, 2:54.**

**Top passers**

- SDG – Dan Fouts – 13/26, 209 yards, TD, 2 INT
- HOU – Lynn Dickey – 19/26, 195 yards, TD, INT

**Top rushers**

- SDG – Cid Edwards – 16 rushes, 100 yards
- HOU – Ronnie Coleman – 21 rushes, 123 yards

**Top receivers**

- SDG – Gary Garrison – 4 receptions, 80 yards, TD
- HOU – George Amundson – 5 receptions, 51 yards, TD

==== Week 2: at Cincinnati Bengals ====
Week Two: San Diego Chargers at Cincinnati Bengals – Game summary

Quarter	1	2	3	4	Total
**Chargers**	7	6	0	7	**20**
Bengals	0	7	10	0	**17**

at Riverfront Stadium, Cincinnati, Ohio

- Date: September 22
- Game time: 1:00 p.m. EDT
- Game weather: 53 °F (11.7 °C), relative humidity 74%, wind 9 mph
- Game attendance: 51,178
- Referee: John Keck
- TV announcers (NBC): Al Michaels and Mike Haffner
- Box score

Game information

**First quarter**

- SDG – Glen Bonner 2-yard run (Dennis Partee kick), 9:06. Chargers 7–0. **Drive: 12 plays, 65 yards, 5:54.**

**Second quarter**

- SDG – Dennis Partee 22-yard field goal, 12:56. Chargers 10–0. **Drive: 6 plays, 14 yards, 2:19.**
- CIN – Lenvil Elliott 16-yard run (Horst Muhlmann kick), 8:06. Chargers 10–7. **Drive: 7 plays, 80 yards, 4:44.**
- SDG – Ray Wersching 28-yard field goal, 2:20. Chargers 13–7. **Drive: 11 plays, 62 yards, 5:46.**

**Third quarter**

- CIN – Boobie Clark 12-yard run (Horst Muhlmann kick), 12:13. Bengals 14–13. **Drive: 6 plays, 66 yards, 2:47.**
- CIN – Horst Muhlmann 34-yard field goal, 2:59. Bengals 17–13. **Drive: 12 plays, 63 yards, 6:20.**

**Fourth quarter**

- SDG – Dan Fouts 1-yard run (Dennis Partee kick), 7:45. Chargers 20–17. **Drive: 10 plays, 98 yards, 4:14.**

**Top passers**

- SDG – Dan Fouts – 13/24, 173 yards
- CIN – Ken Anderson – 17/28, 178 yards, INT

**Top rushers**

- SDG – Cid Edwards – 12 rushes, 45 yards
- CIN – Lenvil Elliott – 11 rushes, 66 yards, TD

**Top receivers**

- SDG – Gary Garrison – 8 receptions, 116 yards
- CIN – Charlie Joiner – 5 receptions, 57 yards

==== Week 3: vs. Miami Dolphins ====
Week Three: Miami Dolphins at San Diego Chargers – Game summary

Quarter	1	2	3	4	Total
**Dolphins**	0	7	0	21	**28**
Chargers	0	7	14	0	**21**

at San Diego Stadium, San Diego, California

- Date: September 29
- Game time: 1:00 p.m. PDT
- Game weather: 69 °F (20.6 °C), relative humidity 75%, wind 10 mph
- Game attendance: 44,706
- Referee: Jim Tunney
- TV announcers (NBC): Ross Porter and Willie Davis
- Box score

Game information

**First quarter**

- No scoring plays.

**Second quarter**

- MIA – Larry Csonka 1-yard run (Garo Yepremian kick), 12:43. Dolphins 7–0. **Drive: 7 plays, 14 yards, 6:55.**
- SDG – Wayne Stewart 21-yard pass from Dan Fouts (Dennis Partee kick), 0:49. Tied 7–7. **Drive: 9 plays, 80 yards, 4:01.**

**Third quarter**

- SDG – Don Woods 1-yard run (Dennis Partee kick), 9:37. Chargers 14–7. **Drive: 10 plays, 75 yards, 5:23.**
- SDG – Don Woods 56-yard run (Dennis Partee kick), 7:51. Chargers 21–7. **Drive: 1 play, 56 yards, 0:09.**

**Fourth quarter**

- MIA – Nat Moore 13-yard pass from Bob Griese (Garo Yepremian kick), 8:30. Chargers 21–14. **Drive: 8 plays, 80 yards, 3:09.**
- MIA – Larry Csonka 3-yard run (Garo Yepremian kick), 3:38. Tied 21–21. **Drive: 6 plays, 57 yards, 2:29.**
- MIA – Jim Kiick 3-yard run (Garo Yepremian kick), 0:15. Dolphins 28–21. **Drive: 6 plays, 42 yards, 1:35.**

**Top passers**

- MIA – Bob Griese – 14/27, 248 yards, TD, 2 INT
- SDG – Dan Fouts – 14/22, 189 yards, TD

**Top rushers**

- MIA – Larry Csonka – 21 rushes, 106 yards, 2 TD
- SDG – Don Woods – 18 rushes, 157 yards, 2 TD

**Top receivers**

- MIA – Jim Mandich – 4 receptions, 101 yards
- SDG – Wayne Stewart – 3 receptions, 71 yards, TD

==== Week 4: vs. Philadelphia Eagles ====
Week Four: Philadelphia Eagles at San Diego Chargers – Game summary

Quarter	1	2	3	4	Total
**Eagles**	6	7	0	0	**13**
Chargers	0	7	0	0	**7**

at San Diego Stadium, San Diego, California

- Date: October 6
- Game time: 1:00 p.m. PDT
- Game weather: 67 °F (19.4 °C), relative humidity 67%, wind 8 mph
- Game attendance: 36,124
- Referee: Norm Schachter
- TV announcers (CBS): Dick Stockton and Tom Brookshier
- Box score

Game information

**First quarter**

- PHI – Bill Dunstan 46-yard defensive fumble return (kick blocked), 5:49. Eagles 6–0.

**Second quarter**

- PHI – Tom Sullivan 1-yard run (Tom Dempsey kick), 2:29. Eagles 13–0. **Drive: 10 plays, 47 yards, 3:32.**
- SDG – Gary Garrison 6-yard pass from Dan Fouts (Dennis Partee kick), 0:29. Eagles 13–7. **Drive: 6 plays, 72 yards, 2:00.**

**Third quarter**

- No scoring plays.

**Fourth quarter**

- No scoring plays.

**Top passers**

- PHI – Roman Gabriel – 18/33, 112 yards, INT
- SDG – Dan Fouts – 13/32, 134 yards, TD, 3 INT

**Top rushers**

- PHI – Po James – 15 rushes, 87 yards
- SDG – Don Woods – 21 rushes, 133 yards

**Top receivers**

- PHI – Tom Sullivan – 5 receptions, 30 yards
- SDG – Cid Edwards – 4 receptions, 50 yards

==== Week 5: vs. Oakland Raiders ====
Week Five: Oakland Raiders at San Diego Chargers – Game summary

Quarter	1	2	3	4	Total
**Raiders**	0	7	0	7	**14**
Chargers	0	3	7	0	**10**

at San Diego Stadium, San Diego, California

- Date: October 13
- Game time: 1:00 p.m. PDT
- Game weather: 67 °F (19.4 °C), relative humidity 74%, wind 9 mph
- Game attendance: 40,539
- Referee: Fred Wyant
- TV announcers (KBHK-TV): Don Klein and Al LoCasale
- Box score

Game information

**First quarter**

- No scoring plays.

**Second quarter**

- SDG – Ray Wersching 42-yard field goal, 5:33. Chargers 3–0. **Drive: 15 plays, 55 yards, 8:08.**
- OAK – Cliff Branch 46-yard pass from Ken Stabler (George Blanda kick), 2:48. Raiders 7–3. **Drive: 5 plays, 75 yards, 2:35.**

**Third quarter**

- SDG – Don Woods 7-yard run (Dennis Partee kick), 5:37. Chargers 10–7. **Drive: 7 plays, 80 yards, 4:28.**

**Fourth quarter**

- OAK – Bob Moore 4-yard pass from Ken Stabler (George Blanda kick), 14:56. Raiders 14–10. **Drive: 12 plays, 80 yards, 5:42.**

**Top passers**

- OAK – Ken Stabler – 12/19, 162 yards, 2 TD, INT
- SDG – Dan Fouts – 11/24, 137 yards, INT

**Top rushers**

- OAK – Marv Hubbard – 14 rushes, 94 yards
- SDG – Don Woods – 17 rushes, 118 yards, TD

**Top receivers**

- OAK – Cliff Branch – 7 receptions, 124 yards, TD
- SDG – Harrison Davis – 2 receptions, 43 yards

==== Week 6: at Denver Broncos ====
Week Six: San Diego Chargers at Denver Broncos – Game summary

Quarter	1	2	3	4	Total
Chargers	0	0	7	0	**7**
**Broncos**	7	10	7	3	**27**

at Mile High Stadium, Denver, Colorado

- Date: October 20
- Game time: 2:00 p.m. MDT
- Game weather: 56 °F (13.3 °C), relative humidity 51%, wind 8 mph
- Game attendance: 50,928
- Referee: Dick Jorgensen
- TV announcers (NBC): Ross Porter and Willie Davis
- Box score

Game information

**First quarter**

- DEN – Riley Odoms 5-yard pass from Charley Johnson (Jim Turner kick), 7:06. Broncos 7–0. **Drive: 13 plays, 80 yards, 7:54.**

**Second quarter**

- DEN – Floyd Little 6-yard run (Jim Turner kick), 6:28. Broncos 10–0. **Drive: 10 plays, 78 yards, 6:14.**
- DEN – Jim Turner 34-yard field goal, 0:00. Broncos 17–0. **Drive: 5 plays, 25 yards, 1:02.**

**Third quarter**

- SDG – Glen Bonner 1-yard run (Dennis Partee kick), 6:54. Broncos 17–7. **Drive: 13 plays, 74 yards, 8:06.**
- DEN – Otis Armstrong 10-yard run (Jim Turner kick), 4:48. Broncos 24–7. **Drive: 4 plays, 90 yards, 2:06.**

**Fourth quarter**

- DEN – Jim Turner 34-yard field goal, 2:15. Chargers 27–7. **Drive: 16 plays, 64 yards, 10:15.**

**Top passers**

- SDG – Dan Fouts – 14/29, 158 yards, 3 INT
- DEN – Charley Johnson – 9/12, 146 yards, TD

**Top rushers**

- SDG – Don Woods – 13 rushes, 39 yards
- DEN – Otis Armstrong – 20 rushes, 98 yards, TD

**Top receivers**

- SDG – Don Woods – 3 receptions, 38 yards
- DEN – Floyd Little – 7 receptions, 127 yards

==== Week 7: vs. Kansas City Chiefs ====
Week Seven: Kansas City Chiefs at San Diego Chargers – Game summary

Quarter	1	2	3	4	Total
**Chiefs**	0	7	7	10	**24**
Chargers	7	0	0	7	**14**

at San Diego Stadium, San Diego, California

- Date: October 27
- Game time: 1:00 p.m. PST
- Game weather: 65 °F (18.3 °C), relative humidity 69%, wind 9 mph
- Game attendance: 34,371
- Referee: Bob Frederic
- TV announcers (NBC): Ross Porter and Willie Davis
- Box score

Game information

**First quarter**

- SDG – Gary Garrison 18-yard pass from Dan Fouts (Dennis Partee kick), 0:04. Chargers 7–0. **Drive: 9 plays, 78 yards, 4:09.**

**Second quarter**

- KAN – Elmo Wright 12-yard run (Jan Stenerud kick), 11:49. Tied 7–7. **Drive: 9 plays, 70 yards, 3:15.**

**Third quarter**

- KAN – Woody Green 2-yard run (Jan Stenerud kick), 10:13. Chiefs 14–7. **Drive: 9 plays, 67 yards, 4:47.**

**Fourth quarter**

- SDG – Don Woods 6-yard run (Dennis Partee kick), 12:06. Tied 14–14. **Drive: 11 plays, 64 yards, 5:29.**
- KAN – Woody Green 69-yard pass from Len Dawson (Jan Stenerud kick), 10:24. Chiefs 21–14. **Drive: 3 plays, 90 yards, 1:42.**
- KAN – Jan Stenerud 23-yard field goal, 0:58. Chiefs 24–14. **Drive: 12 plays, 62 yards, 5:31.**

**Top passers**

- KAN – Len Dawson – 4/4, 84 yards, TD
- SDG – Dan Fouts – 14/27, 221 yards, TD, 2 INT

**Top rushers**

- KAN – Woody Green – 23 rushes, 146 yards, TD
- SDG – Don Woods – 22 rushes, 154 yards, TD

**Top receivers**

- KAN – Woody Green – 4 receptions, 98 yards, TD
- SDG – Gary Garrison – 6 receptions, 92 yards, TD

==== Week 8: vs. Cleveland Browns ====
Week Eight: Cleveland Browns at San Diego Chargers – Game summary

Quarter	1	2	3	4	Total
Browns	14	7	0	14	**35**
**Chargers**	0	7	12	17	**36**

at San Diego Stadium, San Diego, California

- Date: November 3
- Game time: 1:00 p.m. PST
- Game weather: 61 °F (16.1 °C), relative humidity 65%, wind 7 mph
- Game attendance: 35,683
- Referee: Fred Swearingen
- TV announcers (NBC): Ross Porter and Willie Davis
- Box score

Game information

**First quarter**

- CLE – Steve Holden 6-yard pass from Brian Sipe (Don Cockroft kick), 9:20. Browns 7–0. **Drive: 11 plays, 64 yards, 5:40.**
- CLE – Greg Pruitt 3-yard run (Don Cockroft kick), 0:43. Browns 14–0. **Drive: 2 plays, 11 yards, 0:38.**

**Second quarter**

- SDG – Bo Matthews 1-yard run (Dennis Partee kick), 10:57. Browns 14–7. **Drive: 10 plays, 69 yards, 4:41.**
- CLE – Brian Sipe 1-yard run (Don Cockroft kick), 5:19. Browns 21–7. **Drive: 12 plays, 57 yards, 5:38.**

**Third quarter**

- SDG – Don Woods 43-yard pass from Dan Fouts (kick blocked), 11:05. Browns 21–13. **Drive: 2 plays, 54 yards, 0:59.**
- SDG – Glen Bonner 1-yard pass from Dan Fouts (kick failed), 6:42. Browns 21–19. **Drive: 9 plays, 53 yards, 4:23.**

**Fourth quarter**

- CLE – Hugh McKinnis 6-yard run (Don Cockroft kick), 14:56. Browns 28–19. **Drive: 4 plays, 18 yards, 1:11.**
- SDG – Harrison Davis 70-yard pass from Dan Fouts (Dennis Partee kick), 14:27. Browns 28–26. **Drive: 3 plays, 70 yards, 0:29.**
- CLE – Brian Sipe 1-yard run (Don Cockroft kick), 9:47. Browns 35–26. **Drive: 8 plays, 59 yards, 4:40.**
- SDG – Don Woods 75-yard pass from Dan Fouts (Dennis Partee kick), 9:26. Browns 35–33. **Drive: 1 play, 75 yards, 0:21.**
- SDG – Ray Wersching 40-yard field goal, 0:55. Chargers 36–35. **Drive: 4 plays, 8 yards, 2:23.**

**Top passers**

- CLE – Brian Sipe – 16/23, 186 yards, TD, INT
- SDG – Dan Fouts – 12/21, 333 yards, 4 TD, INT

**Top rushers**

- CLE – Hugh McKinnis – 11 rushes, 48 yards, TD
- SDG – Don Woods – 18 rushes, 51 yards

**Top receivers**

- CLE – Steve Holden – 6 receptions, 85 yards, TD
- SDG – Don Woods – 3 receptions, 119 yards, 2 TD

==== Week 9: at Kansas City Chiefs ====
Week Nine: San Diego Chargers at Kansas City Chiefs – Game summary

Quarter	1	2	3	4	Total
**Chargers**	0	7	0	7	**14**
Chiefs	0	0	0	7	**7**

at Arrowhead Stadium, Kansas City, Missouri

- Date: November 10
- Game time: 12:00 p.m. CST
- Game weather: 48 °F (8.9 °C), relative humidity 98%, wind 9 mph
- Game attendance: 48,551
- Referee: Tommy Bell
- TV announcers (NBC): Ross Porter and Willie Davis
- Box score

Game information

**First quarter**

- No scoring plays.

**Second quarter**

- SDG – Bo Matthews 1-yard run (Dennis Partee kick), 6:19. Chargers 7–0. **Drive: 14 plays, 52 yards, 7:27.**

**Third quarter**

- No scoring plays.

**Fourth quarter**

- KAN – Larry Brunson 84-yard pass from Len Dawson (Jan Stenerud kick), 10:03. Tied 7–7. **Drive: 3 plays, 87 yards, 0:54.**
- SDG – Gary Garrison 71-yard pass from Jesse Freitas (Dennis Partee kick), 9:02. Chargers 14–7. **Drive: 2 plays, 73 yards, 0:50.**

**Top passers**

- SDG – Jesse Freitas – 6/15, 120 yards, TD, 2 INT
- KAN – Len Dawson – 26/44, 381 yards, TD, INT

**Top rushers**

- SDG – Bo Matthews – 21 rushes, 73 yards, TD
- KAN – Woody Green – 19 rushes, 54 yards

**Top receivers**

- SDG – Gary Garrison – 2 receptions, 84 yards, TD
- KAN – Larry Brunson – 8 receptions, 193 yards, TD

==== Week 10: at Oakland Raiders ====
Week Ten: San Diego Chargers at Oakland Raiders – Game summary

Quarter	1	2	3	4	Total
Chargers	0	3	0	7	**10**
**Raiders**	7	0	7	3	**17**

at Oakland-Alameda County Coliseum, Oakland, California

- Date: November 17
- Game time: 1:00 p.m. PST
- Game weather: 58 °F (14.4 °C), relative humidity 71%, wind 9 mph
- Game attendance: 50,178
- Referee: Pat Haggerty
- TV announcers (NBC): Ross Porter and Willie Davis
- Box score

Game information

**First quarter**

- OAK – Cliff Branch 60-yard pass from Ken Stabler (George Blanda kick), 7:06. Raiders 7–0. **Drive: 1 play, 60 yards, 0:11.**

**Second quarter**

- SDG – Ray Wersching 42-yard field goal, 4:43. Raiders 7–3. **Drive: 12 plays, 66 yards, 6:08.**

**Third quarter**

- OAK – Pete Banaszak 1-yard run (George Blanda kick), 1:37. Raiders 14–3. **Drive: 13 plays, 62 yards, 6:04.**

**Fourth quarter**

- OAK – George Blanda 28-yard field goal, 6:29. Raiders 17–3. **Drive: 13 plays, 62 yards, 6:42.**
- SDG – Don Woods 1-yard run (Dennis Partee kick), 5:17. Raiders 17–10. **Drive: 4 plays, 79 yards, 1:12.**

**Top passers**

- SDG – Dan Fouts – 9/21, 159 yards
- OAK – Ken Stabler – 16/32, 240 yards, TD, INT

**Top rushers**

- SDG – Don Woods – 27 rushes, 117 yards, TD
- OAK – Pete Banaszak – 12 rushes, 39 yards, TD

**Top receivers**

- SDG – Gary Garrison – 2 receptions, 73 yards
- OAK – Cliff Branch – 7 receptions, 125 yards, TD

==== Week 11: at Green Bay Packers ====
Week Eleven: San Diego Chargers at Green Bay Packers – Game summary

Quarter	1	2	3	4	Total
Chargers	0	0	0	0	**0**
**Packers**	3	10	14	7	**34**

at Lambeau Field, Green Bay, Wisconsin

- Date: November 24
- Game time: 1:00 p.m. CST
- Game weather: 35 °F (1.7 °C), relative humidity 77%, wind 15 mph, wind chill 25
- Game attendance: 56,267
- TV announcers (NBC): Ross Porter and Willie Davis
- Box score

Game information

**First quarter**

- GB – Chester Marcol 22-yard field goal. Packers 3–0.

**Second quarter**

- GB – Chester Marcol 27-yard field goal. Packers 6–0.
- GB – Eric Torkelson 29-yard fumble return (Chester Marcol kick). Packers 13–0.

**Third quarter**

- GB – Ken Ellis 38-yard interception return (Chester Marcol kick). Packers 20–0.
- GB – MacArthur Lane 24-yard pass from John Hadl (Chester Marcol kick). Packers 27–0.

**Fourth quarter**

- GB – Steve Odom 56-yard pass from Jack Concannon (Chester Marcol kick). Packers 34–0.

**Top passers**

- SDG – Jesse Freitas – 8/23, 195 yards, INT
- GB – John Hadl – 14/22, 157 yards, TD, INT

**Top rushers**

- SDG – Don Woods – 14 rushes, 50 yards
- GB – John Brockington – 13 rushes, 47 yards

**Top receivers**

- SDG – Gary Garrison – 2 receptions, 32 yards
- GB – Jon Staggers – 6 receptions, 80 yards

==== Week 12: at New York Jets ====
Week Twelve: San Diego Chargers at New York Jets – Game summary

Quarter	1	2	3	4	Total
Chargers	0	0	0	14	**14**
**Jets**	10	14	3	0	**27**

at Shea Stadium, New York, New York

- Date: December 1
- Game time: 1:00 p.m. EST
- Game weather: 37 °F (2.8 °C), relative humidity 70%, wind 19 mph, wind chill 26
- Game attendance: 44,888
- Referee: Cal Lepore
- TV announcers (NBC): Charlie Jones and Sam DeLuca
- Box score

Game information

**First quarter**

- NYJ – John Riggins 4-yard pass from Joe Namath (Pat Leahy kick), 11:27. Jets 7–0. **Drive: 6 plays, 61 yards, 3:33.**
- NYJ – Pat Leahy 20-yard field goal, 7:08. Jets 10–0. **Drive: 9 play, 54 yards, 3:03.**

**Second quarter**

- NYJ – John Riggins 3-yard run (Pat Leahy kick), 5:37. Jets 17–0. **Drive: 8 plays, 72 yards, 4:24.**
- NYJ – John Riggins 2-yard run (Pat Leahy kick), 0:25. Jets 24–0. **Drive: 8 plays, 42 yards, 2:20.**

**Third quarter**

- NYJ – Pat Leahy 45-yard field goal, 9:31. Jets 27–0. **Drive: 8 plays, 44 yards, 3:24.**

**Fourth quarter**

- SDG – Gary Garrison 28-yard pass from Don Woods (Dennis Partee kick), 13:14. Jets 27–7. **Drive: 5 plays, 59 yards, 1:46.**
- SDG – Don Woods 4-yard run (Dennis Partee kick), 0:49. Jets 27–14. **Drive: 5 plays, 16 yards, 1:05.**

**Top passers**

- SDG – Jesse Freitas – 10/23, 147 yards, 2 INT
- NYJ – Joe Namath – 17/27, 254 yards, TD

**Top rushers**

- SDG – Don Woods – 25 rushes, 142 yards, TD
- NYJ – John Riggins – 18 rushes, 61 yards, 2 TD

**Top receivers**

- SDG – Gary Garrison – 4 receptions, 109 yards, TD
- NYJ – Rich Caster – 7 receptions, 137 yards

==== Week 13: vs. Chicago Bears ====
Week Thirteen: Chicago Bears at San Diego Chargers – Game summary

Quarter	1	2	3	4	Total
Bears	7	0	14	0	**21**
**Chargers**	0	7	7	14	**28**

at San Diego Stadium, San Diego, California

- Date: December 8
- Game time: 1:00 p.m. PST
- Game weather: 60 °F (15.6 °C), relative humidity 47%, wind 6 mph
- Game attendance: 33,662
- TV announcers (CBS): Dick Stockton and Bart Starr
- Box score

Game information

**First quarter**

- CHI – Ken Grandberry 4-yard run (Mirro Roder kick). Bears 7–0.

**Second quarter**

- SDG – Don Woods 21-yard pass from Jesse Freitas (Dennis Partee kick). Tied 7–7.

**Third quarter**

- SDG – Blenda Gay 17-yard fumble return (Dennis Partee kick). Chargers 14–7.
- CHI – Perry Williams 3-yard run (Mirro Roder kick). Tied 14–14.
- CHI – Wayne Wheeler 19-yard pass from Bobby Douglass (Mirro Roder kick). Bears 21–14.

**Fourth quarter**

- SDG – Harrison Davis 43-yard pass from Jesse Freitas (Dennis Partee kick). Tied 21–21.
- SDG – Bo Matthews 1-yard run (Dennis Partee kick). Chargers 28–21.

**Top passers**

- CHI – Bobby Douglass – 14/25, 136 yards, TD, 2 INT
- SDG – Jesse Freitas – 9/19, 156 yards, 2 TD, INT

**Top rushers**

- CHI – Hugh McKinnis – 11 rushes, 48 yards, TD
- SDG – Don Woods – 26 rushes, 75 yards

**Top receivers**

- CHI – Charlie Wade – 3 receptions, 48 yards
- SDG – Harrison Davis – 3 receptions, 86 yards, TD

==== Week 14: vs. Denver Broncos ====
Week Fourteen: Denver Broncos at San Diego Chargers – Game summary

Quarter	1	2	3	4	Total
Broncos	0	0	0	0	**0**
**Chargers**	7	7	0	3	**17**

at San Diego Stadium, San Diego, California

- Date: December 15
- Game time: 1:00 p.m. EST
- Game weather: 58 °F (14.4 °C), relative humidity 48%, wind 7 mph
- Game attendance: 36,571
- Referee: Ben Dreith
- TV announcers (NBC): Ross Porter and Willie Davis
- Box score

Game information

**First quarter**

- SDG – Don Woods 6-yard run (Dennis Partee kick), 6:23. Chargers 7–0. **Drive: 10 plays, 80 yards, 3:47.**

**Second quarter**

- SDG – Bo Matthews 1-yard run (Dennis Partee kick), 14:58. Chargers 14–0. **Drive: 9 plays, 33 yards, 4:05.**

**Third quarter**

- No scoring plays.

**Fourth quarter**

- SDG – Ray Wersching 37-yard field goal, 4:09. Chargers 17–0. **Drive: 12 plays, 66 yards, 7:11.**

**Top passers**

- DEN – Steve Ramsey – 8/13, 94 yards, 2 INT
- SDG – Jesse Freitas – 16/29, 201 yards, 2 INT

**Top rushers**

- DEN – Otis Armstrong – 18 rushes, 142 yards
- SDG – Don Woods – 24 rushes, 105 yards, TD

**Top receivers**

- DEN – Riley Odoms – 5 receptions, 66 yards
- SDG – Harrison Davis – 5 receptions, 77 yards

== Awards ==
Only one Charger was named to the 1975 Pro Bowl, with tackle Russ Washington a starter on the AFC squad; none were selected for the AP All-Pro first or second teams, though Washington was named the best in his Conference. Woods won the AP Offensive Rookie of the Year with 52 of the 78 votes available.
