= 1974 WFL Draft =

General information
- Dates: January 22 and February 5, 1974
- Location: JW Marriott Essex House, New York

Overview
- 432 total selections in 36 rounds
- League: WFL
- First selection: David Jaynes, QB; Houston Texans

The 1974 WFL Draft was the first collegiate draft of the World Football League (WFL). The first 6 rounds took place on January 4, at the JW Marriott Essex House in New York. The final thirty rounds were postponed until February 5.

On March 18, 1974, in addition to this selection process, the WFL held a Pro Draft of players from the NFL and CFL. It consisted of 480 selections in 40 rounds.

This would also be the last collegiate draft of the league. In 1975, because of the uncertainties facing the WFL, only a Pro Draft of entire NFL and CFL teams was held at its league meetings in Birmingham, Alabama.

== Player selections ==
= All-Star
= WFL MVP

Round	Pick #	WFL Team	Player	Position	College
1	1	Houston Texans	David Jaynes	QB	Kansas
1	2	New York Stars	Gary Marangi	QB	Boston College
1	3	Jacksonville Sharks	Woody Green	RB	Arizona State
1	4	Memphis Southmen	Bo Matthews	RB	Colorado
1	5	Birmingham Americans	Wilbur Jackson	RB	Alabama
1	6	Portland Storm	Mike Boryla	QB	Stanford
1	7	Southern California Sun	James McAlister	RB	UCLA
1	8	Philadelphia Bell	John Cappelletti	RB	Penn State
1	9	The Hawaiians	Fred McNeill	LB	UCLA
1	10	Chicago Fire	Bill Kollar	DE	Montana State
1	11	Florida Blazers	Barty Smith	RB	Richmond
1	12	Detroit Wheels	Paul Seal	TE	Michigan
2	13	Detroit Wheels	Rick Middleton	LB	Ohio State
2	14	Jacksonville Sharks	John Hicks	T	Ohio State
2	15	Chicago Fire	Danny White	QB	Arizona State
2	16	The Hawaiians	Rod McNeill	RB	USC
2	17	Philadelphia Bell	Joe Pisarcik	QB	New Mexico State
2	18	Southern California Sun	Kermit Johnson	RB	UCLA
2	19	Portland Storm	Ed O'Neil	LB	Penn State
2	20	Florida Blazers	Waymond Bryant	LB	Tennessee State
2	21	Memphis Southmen	Kim McQuilken	QB	Lehigh
2	22	Birmingham Americans	Denny Duron	QB	Louisiana Tech
2	23	New York Stars	Carl Barzilauskas	DT	Indiana
2	24	Houston Texans	Lynn Swann	WR	USC
3	25	Houston Texans	Fred Cook	DE	Southern Miss
3	26	New York Stars	Randy Gradishar	LB	Ohio State
3	27	Jacksonville Sharks	John Dutton	DE	Nebraska
3	28	Memphis Southmen	Norris Weese	QB	Ole Miss
3	29	Birmingham Americans	Don Reese	DE	Jackson State
3	30	Portland Storm	Carlester Crumpler	RB	East Carolina
3	31	Southern California Sun	Booker Brown	G	USC
3	32	Philadelphia Bell	John Stallworth	WR	Alabama A&M
3	33	The Hawaiians	Al Oliver	T	UCLA
3	34	Chicago Fire	Dave Casper	TE	Notre Dame
3	35	Florida Blazers	Paul Vellano	DT	Maryland
3	36	Detroit Wheels	Ed Jones	DE	Tennessee State
4	37	Detroit Wheels	Ed Shuttlesworth	RB	Michigan
4	38	Florida Blazers	Gordie Browne	T	Boston College
4	39	Chicago Fire	Steve Craig	TE	Northwestern
4	40	The Hawaiians	Jon Keyworth	RB	Colorado
4	41	Philadelphia Bell	Mark Markovich	G	Penn State
4	42	Southern California Sun	Jesse Freitas Jr.	QB	San Diego State
4	43	Portland Storm	Daryl White	G	Nebraska
4	44	Birmingham Americans	Jim Cagle	DE	Georgia
4	45	Memphis Southmen	Steve Odom	WR	Utah
4	46	Jacksonville Sharks	Wayne Wheeler	WR	Alabama
4	47	New York Stars	Dave Gallagher	DE	Michigan
4	48	Houston Texans	Haskel Stanback	RB	Tennessee
5	49	Houston Texans	Liff Taylor	RB	Memphis State
5	50	New York Stars	Keith Fahnhorst	TE	Minnesota
5	51	Jacksonville Sharks	Nat Moore	RB	Florida
5	52	Memphis Southmen	Benny Malone	WR	Arizona State
5	53	Birmingham Americans	Roger Carr	WR	Louisiana Tech
5	54	Portland Storm	J.V. Cain	TE	Colorado
5	55	Southern California Sun	Bill Sandifer	DT	UCLA
5	56	Philadelphia Bell	Marty Woolbright	TE	South Carolina
5	57	The Hawaiians	John Kelsey	T	Missouri
5	58	Chicago Fire	Charlie Getty	T	Penn State
5	59	Florida Blazers	Bill Wyman	C	Texas
5	60	Detroit Wheels	Peil Pennington	QB	UMass
6	61	Detroit Wheels	Clint Haslerig	WR	Michigan
6	62	Florida Blazers	Gerald Tinker	WR	Kent State
6	63	Chicago Fire	Charlie Davis	RB	Colorado
6	64	The Hawaiians	Levi Stanley	DT	Hawaii
6	65	Philadelphia Bell	Jack Lambert	LB	Kent State
6	66	Southern California Sun	Jeris White	DB	Hawaii
6	67	Portland Storm	Carl Capria	DB	Purdue
6	68	Birmingham Americans	Greg Gantt	K	Alabama
6	69	Memphis Southmen	Lucious Selmon	DT	Oklahoma
6	70	Jacksonville Sharks	Mike Townsend	DB	Notre Dame
6	71	New York Stars	Steve Corbett	C	Boston College
6	72	Houston Texans	Butch Veazey	TE	Ole Miss
7	73	Jacksonville Sharks	Henry Lawrence	T	Florida A&M
7	74	New York Stars	Jimmy Allen	DB	UCLA
7	75	Jacksonville Sharks	Andy Johnson	RB	Georgia
7	76	Memphis Southmen	Clyde Powers	DB	Oklahoma
7	77	Birmingham Americans	Steve Taylor	C	Auburn
7	78	Portland Storm	Monte Doris	DT	USC
7	79	Southern California Sun	Durwood Keeton	DB	Oklahoma
7	80	Philadelphia Bell	Alan Chadwick	RB	East Tennessee State
7	81	The Hawaiians	Greg Horton	T	Colorado
7	82	Chicago Fire	Mark Kellar	RB	Northern Illinois
7	83	Florida Blazers	Bart Purvis	T	Maryland
7	84	Detroit Wheels	Bill Simpson	DB	Michigan State
8	85	Detroit Wheels	Tony Bell	DB	Bowling Green
8	86	Florida Blazers	Billy Yoest	G	NC State
8	87	Chicago Fire	Glenn Robinson	DE	Oklahoma State
8	88	The Hawaiians	Gary Baccus	LB	Oklahoma
8	89	Philadelphia Bell	Ezil Bibbs	DE	Grambling State
8	90	Southern California Sun	Mike Raines	DT	Alabama
8	91	Portland Storm	Richard Bishop	DT	Louisville
8	92	Birmingham Americans	Roscoe Word	DB	Jackson State
8	93	Memphis Southmen	Harold Hart	RB	Texas Southern
8	94	Jacksonville Sharks	Keith Krepfle	TE	Iowa State
8	95	New York Stars	Steve Neils	LB	Minnesota
8	96	Jacksonville Sharks	Wayne Jones	RB	Mississippi State
9	97	Houston Texans	Greg Hare	RB	Ohio State
9	98	New York Stars	Matt Herkenhoff	T	Minnesota
9	99	Jacksonville Sharks	Henry Childs	RB	Kansas State
9	100	Memphis Southmen	Bob Lally	LB	Cornell
9	101	Birmingham Americans	Jim Kregel	G	Ohio State
9	102	Portland Storm	Billy Howard	DT	Alcorn State
9	103	Southern California Sun	Cal Peterson	LB	UCLA
9	104	Philadelphia Bell	Tim Guy	T	Oregon
9	105	The Hawaiians	Larry Bailey	DT	Pacific
9	106	Chicago Fire	Isaac Jackson	RB	Kansas State
9	107	Florida Blazers	Carl Summerell	QB	East Carolina
9	108	Detroit Wheels	Jim Pietrzak	C	Eastern Michigan
10	109	Detroit Wheels	Marvin Williams	WR	Western Illinois
10	110	Florida Blazers	Greg Latta	TE	Morgan State
10	111	Chicago Fire	Ken Grandberry	RB	Washington State
10	112	The Hawaiians	Jeff Sevy	DT	California
10	113	Philadelphia Bell	Tom Wickert	T	Washington State
10	114	Southern California Sun	Cleveland Vann	LB	Oklahoma State
10	115	Portland Storm	Godwin Turk	LB	Southern
10	116	Birmingham Americans	Frank LeMaster	LB	Kentucky
10	117	Memphis Southmen	J.J. Jennings	RB	Rutgers
10	118	Jacksonville Sharks	Danny Rhodes	LB	Arkansas
10	119	New York Stars	Tom Forrest	G	Cincinnati
10	120	Houston Texans	Noe Gonzales	QB	Southwest Texas State
11	121	Houston Texans	Dan Scott	T	Ohio State
11	122	New York Stars	Darryl Bishop	DB	Kentucky
11	123	Jacksonville Sharks	Fred Rothwell	C	Kansas State
11	124	Memphis Southmen	Matt Blair	LB	Iowa State
11	125	Birmingham Americans	Dave Lapham	G	Syracuse
11	126	Portland Storm	Robert Pratt	G	North Carolina
11	127	Southern California Sun	Jim Bright	DB	UCLA
11	128	Philadelphia Bell	Paul Ryczek	C	Virginia
11	129	The Hawaiians	Joe Barnes	QB	Texas Tech
11	130	Chicago Fire	Joe Montgomery	C	William & Mary
11	131	Florida Blazers	Ken Pope	DB	Oklahoma
11	132	Detroit Wheels	Jim Coode	G	Michigan
12	133	Detroit Wheels	Dennis Morgan	RB	Western Illinois
12	134	Florida Blazers	Rick Druschel	T	NC State
12	135	Chicago Fire	Joe Miller	T	Villanova
12	136	The Hawaiians	Dave Atkinson	DB	BYU
12	137	Philadelphia Bell	Bon Boatwright	G	Oklahoma State
12	138	Southern California Sun	Neal Skarin	DT	Arizona State
12	139	Portland Storm	Doug Nettles	DB	Vanderbilt
12	140	Birmingham Americans	Mark Ilgenfritz	DT	Vanderbilt
12	141	Memphis Southmen	Bill McDonald	C	Colorado
12	142	Jacksonville Sharks	Eddie Brown	DB	Tennessee
12	143	New York Stars	Alvin Maxson	RB	SMU
12	144	Houston Texans	Dan Dickel	LB	Iowa
13	145	Houston Texans	Alvin Brown	DB	Oklahoma State
13	146	New York Stars	Monroe Eley	RB	Arizona State
13	147	Jacksonville Sharks	Ken Hutcherson	LB	Livingston
13	148	Memphis Southmen	Dave Brooks	G	BYU
13	149	Birmingham Americans	Al Sitterle	T	NC State
13	150	Portland Storm	Harrison Davis	WR	Virginia
13	151	Southern California Sun	Leonard Fairley	DB	Alcorn State
13	152	Philadelphia Bell	Charlie Davis	DT	TCU
13	153	The Hawaiians	Manfred Moore	RB	USC
13	154	Chicago Fire	Mike Webster	C	Wisconsin
13	155	Florida Blazers	Lonnie Crittenden	WR	UTEP
13	156	Detroit Wheels	Dan Dixon	G	Boise State
14	157	Detroit Wheels	Ray Nester	LB	Michigan State
14	158	Florida Blazers	Mark van Eeghen	RB	Colgate
14	159	Chicago Fire	John Teerlinck	DE	Western Illinois
14	160	The Hawaiians	Robin Sinclair	DB	Washington State
14	161	Philadelphia Bell	Tom Hull	LB	Penn State
14	162	Southern California Sun	Mike Seifert	DT	Wisconsin
14	163	Portland Storm	Bob Wolfe	T	Nebraska
14	164	Birmingham Americans	Buddy Brown	G	Alabama
14	165	Memphis Southmen	Gene Killian	T	Tennessee
14	166	Jacksonville Sharks	John Tate	LB	Jackson State
14	167	New York Stars	Ransom Terrell	LB	Arizona
14	168	Houston Texans	Ray Rhodes	RB	Tulsa
15	169	Houston Texans	Don Woods	RB	New Mexico
15	170	New York Stars	Doug Troszak	DE	Michigan
15	171	Jacksonville Sharks	Carl Swierc	WR	Rice
15	172	Memphis Southmen	Don Clune	WR	Penn
15	173	Birmingham Americans	Jimmy Poulos	RB	Georgia
15	174	Portland Storm	Phil LaPorta	G	Penn State
15	175	Southern California Sun	Dickey Morton	RB	Arkansas
15	176	Philadelphia Bell	Gary Hayman	WR	Penn State
15	177	The Hawaiians	Billy Johnson	WR	Widener
15	178	Chicago Fire	Octavus Morgan	LB	Illinois
15	179	Florida Blazers	Jim McCollum	DT	Kentucky
15	180	Detroit Wheels	Andy Andrade	RB	Northern Michigan
16	181	Detroit Wheels	Walt Williamson	DE	Michigan
16	182	Florida Blazers	Jessie Wolf	DT	Prairie View A&M
16	183	Chicago Fire	Frank Pomarico	G	Notre Dame
16	184	The Hawaiians	John Ketchoyian	LB	Santa Clara
16	185	Philadelphia Bell	Randy Crowder	DT	Penn State
16	186	Southern California Sun	Gary Valbuena	QB	Tennessee
16	187	Portland Storm	David Smith	LB	Oklahoma
16	188	Birmingham Americans	Ted Powell	TE	Ohio State
16	189	Memphis Southmen	Ned Guillet	DB	Boston College
16	190	Jacksonville Sharks	Glen Gaspard	LB	Texas
16	191	New York Stars	Mark Gefert	LB	Purdue
16	192	Houston Texans	John Holland	WR	Tennessee State
17	193	Houston Texans	Scott Garske	TE	Eastern Washington
17	194	New York Stars	Tom Condon	G	Boston College
17	195	Jacksonville Sharks	Sam Baker	G	Georgia
17	196	Memphis Southmen	Rex Humbarger	DE	North Texas State
17	197	Birmingham Americans	Skip Kubelius	DT	Alabama
17	198	Portland Storm	Willie Burden	RB	NC State
17	199	Southern California Sun	Vic Koegel	LB	Ohio State
17	200	Philadelphia Bell	Mark Sens	DT	Colorado
17	201	The Hawaiians	Lem Burnham	DT	U.S. International
17	202	Chicago Fire	Gerry Sullivan	T	Illinois
17	203	Florida Blazers	Joe Sullivan	DT	Boston College
17	204	Detroit Wheels	Al Davis	T	Boise State
18	205	Detroit Wheels	Freddie Scott	WR	Amherst
18	206	Florida Blazers	Ken Sawyer	DB	Syracuse
18	207	Chicago Fire	Nate Anderson	RB	Eastern Illinois
18	208	The Hawaiians	Terry Schmidt	DB	Ball State
18	209	Philadelphia Bell	John Ricca	DE	Duke
18	210	Southern California Sun	Steve Gunther	T	Arizona State
18	211	Portland Storm	Darrell Austin	T	South Carolina
18	212	Birmingham Americans	Scott Anderson	C	Missouri
18	213	Memphis Southmen	Larry Hunt	DT	Iowa State
18	214	Jacksonville Sharks	Doyle Orange	RB	Southern Miss
18	215	New York Stars	Reggie Harrison	RB	Cincinnati
18	216	Houston Texans	Robert Woods	LB	Howard Payne
19	217	Houston Texans	Eddie Collins	WR	Rice
19	218	New York Stars	Phil Bennett	RB	Boston College
19	219	Jacksonville Sharks	Steve Buchanan	RB	Holy Cross
19	220	Memphis Southmen	Sylvester Bates	DT	Grambling State
19	221	Birmingham Americans	Mike Holt	DB	Michigan State
19	222	Portland Storm	Glenn Ellis	DT	Elon
19	223	Southern California Sun	Ed Kezirian	T	UCLA
19	224	Philadelphia Bell	Randy Poltl	DB	Stanford
19	225	The Hawaiians	Jimmy Sims	LB	USC
19	226	Chicago Fire	Mike Varty	LB	Northwestern
19	227	Florida Blazers	Willie Cullars	DE	Kansas State
19	228	Detroit Wheels	Dominic Riggio	LB	Western Michigan
20	229	Detroit Wheels	Eddie Johnson	DT	SMU
20	230	Florida Blazers	Ron McNeil	DE	North Carolina Central
20	231	Chicago Fire	George Uremovich	RB	Illinois
20	232	The Hawaiians	Dave Ottmar	QB	Stanford
20	233	Philadelphia Bell	Dave Wannstedt	T	Pittsburgh
20	234	Southern California Sun	Bill Reid	C	Stanford
20	235	Portland Storm	Ed Bishop	DB	Southern
20	236	Birmingham Americans	Norm Hodgins	WR	LSU
20	237	Memphis Southmen	Jack Ettinger	WR	Arkansas
20	238	Jacksonville Sharks	Eddie Foster	T	Oklahoma
20	239	New York Stars	Leroy Jones	DE	Norfolk State
20	240	Houston Texans	Keith Benson	WR	San Diego State
21	241	Houston Texans	Shawney Wynn	DT	Tennessee State
21	242	New York Stars	Rudy McClinon	DB	Xavier
21	243	Jacksonville Sharks	Henry Lewis	T	Iowa State
21	244	Memphis Southmen	Bobby Brooks	DB	Bishop
21	245	Birmingham Americans	Steve Manstedt	LB	Nebraska
21	246	Portland Storm	T.C. Blair	TE	Tulsa
21	247	Southern California Sun	Greg Bailey	DB	Long Beach State
21	248	Philadelphia Bell	Barry Beers	G	William & Mary
21	249	The Hawaiians	Fred Weber	DE	California
21	250	Chicago Fire	John Bryant	T	Kansas
21	251	Florida Blazers	Jimmie Davis	G	Alcorn State
21	252	Detroit Wheels	Larry Cipa	QB	Michigan
22	253	Detroit Wheels	Doug Neuendorf	G	Toledo
22	254	Florida Blazers	Danny Colbert	DB	Tulsa
22	255	Chicago Fire	Mike Rogowski	LB	Illinois Benedictine
22	256	The Hawaiians	Fred Lima	K	Colorado
22	257	Philadelphia Bell	Rod Kirby	LB	Pittsburgh
22	258	Southern California Sun	Alonzo Emery	RB	Arizona State
22	259	Portland Storm	John Winesberry	WR	Stanford
22	260	Birmingham Americans	Bill Rudder	RB	Tennessee
22	261	Memphis Southmen	John Harvey	RB	Texas–Arlington
22	262	Jacksonville Sharks	Morris Bradshaw	RB	Ohio State
22	263	New York Stars	Willie Viney	G	Pacific
22	264	Houston Texans	Gerry Roberts	DT	UCLA
23	265	Houston Texans	Mike Denimarck	LB	Emporia State
23	266	New York Stars	Chris Arnold	DB	Virginia State
23	267	Jacksonville Sharks	Doug Allen	LB	Penn State
23	268	Memphis Southmen	Albert Holmes	RB	Hawaii
23	269	Birmingham Americans	Mike Truax	LB	Tulane
23	270	Portland Storm	Richard Mason	T	Baylor
23	271	Southern California Sun	Steve Riley	T	USC
23	272	Philadelphia Bell	Cecil Bowens	RB	Kentucky
23	273	The Hawaiians	Pete Taggares	RB	Washington
23	274	Chicago Fire	Tom Owen	QB	Wichita State
23	275	Florida Blazers	Tommy Reamon	RB	Missouri
23	276	Detroit Wheels	George Spanish	RB	Moorhead State
24	277	Detroit Wheels	Dave Boone	DE	Eastern Michigan
24	278	Florida Blazers	Maury Damkroger	RB	Nebraska
24	279	Chicago Fire	Chuck Ramsey	K	Wake Forest
24	280	The Hawaiians	Samaji Adi Akili	DB	California
24	281	Philadelphia Bell	Kent Merritt	WR	Virginia
24	282	Southern California Sun	Jack Conners	DB	Oregon
24	283	Portland Storm	Brad Bush	C	New Mexico State
24	284	Birmingham Americans	Sam Johnson	LB	Arizona State
24	285	Memphis Southmen	Gary Pinkel	TE	Kent State
24	286	Jacksonville Sharks	Charlie Johnson	DB	Southern
24	287	New York Stars	John Robb	G	Pittsburgh
24	288	Houston Texans	Frosty Anderson	WR	Nebraska
25	289	Houston Texans	Billy Brittain	C	Kansas State
25	290	New York Stars	Gary Champagne	LB	LSU
25	291	Jacksonville Sharks	Doug Lowrey	C	Arkansas State
25	292	Memphis Southmen	Bill Schlegel	TE	Lehigh
25	293	Birmingham Americans	Dexter Bussey	RB	Texas–Arlington
25	294	Portland Storm	Eric Torkelson	RB	Connecticut
25	295	Southern California Sun	Claudie Minor	T	San Diego State
25	296	Philadelphia Bell	Dave Margavage	T	Kentucky
25	297	The Hawaiians	D.C. Nobles	QB	Houston
25	298	Chicago Fire	Ken Starling	RB	Indiana
25	299	Florida Blazers	Mike McCoy	DB	Western Kentucky
25	300	Detroit Wheels	Jack Stebbins	QB	Jersey City State
26	301	Detroit Wheels	Earl Garrett	DB	UMass–Boston
26	302	Florida Blazers	Noah Jackson	G	Tampa
26	303	Chicago Fire	Clayton Heath	RB	Wake Forest
26	304	The Hawaiians	Mike McGirr	T	USC
26	305	Philadelphia Bell	Alan Dixon	RB	Harding
26	306	Southern California Sun	Deke Ballard	DT	Arizona State
26	307	Portland Storm	Berl Simmons	K	TCU
26	308	Birmingham Americans	Charles DeJurnett	DT	San Jose State
26	309	Memphis Southmen	Mike Phillips	DT	Cornell
26	310	Jacksonville Sharks	Raymond Burke	TE	South Carolina State
26	311	New York Stars	Greg Pemberton	DB	Boston University
26	312	Houston Texans	Pete Wessel	DB	Northwestern
27	313	Houston Texans	Harry Holton	T	UTEP
27	314	New York Stars	Preston Anderson	DB	Rice
27	315	Jacksonville Sharks	Bruce Henley	TE	Rice
27	316	Memphis Southmen	Charles Anthony	LB	USC
27	317	Birmingham Americans	Steve Mikez	QB	Western Illinois
27	318	Portland Storm	Mike Stover	DB	Illinois State
27	319	Southern California Sun	Ray Olsen	G	Pittsburgh
27	320	Philadelphia Bell	Tom Gooden	WR	Harding
27	321	The Hawaiians	Randy Geist	DB	Colorado
27	322	Chicago Fire	Greg Meczka	TE	Bowling Green
27	323	Florida Blazers	Evan Jolitz	LB	Cincinnati
27	324	Detroit Wheels	Mike Kleinhenz	LB	Cincinnati
28	325	Detroit Wheels	Loren Ducett	WR	Trinity (CT)
28	326	Florida Blazers	Fred Tabron	RB	Southwest Missouri State
28	327	Chicago Fire	Dave Grannell	TE	Arizona State
28	328	The Hawaiians	Clyde Warehime	LB	Washington State
28	329	Philadelphia Bell	Randy Borg	DB	Nebraska
28	330	Southern California Sun	Jim Bowman	DB	Kansas
28	331	Portland Storm	Willie Brister	TE	Southern
28	332	Birmingham Americans	Stan Rebsch	DB	Miami (OH)
28	333	Memphis Southmen	Billy Corbett	G	Johnson C. Smith
28	334	Jacksonville Sharks	Hank Foldberg	T	Florida
28	335	New York Stars	Jeff Rouzie	LB	Alabama
28	336	Houston Texans	Ron Rydalch	DT	Utah
29	337	Houston Texans	Rick Dvorak	LB	Wichita State
29	338	New York Stars	Scott Marquis	T	Tulsa
29	339	Jacksonville Sharks	Jim Revels	DB	Florida
29	340	Memphis Southmen	Artimus Parker	DB	USC
29	341	Birmingham Americans	Sammy Johnson	RB	North Carolina
29	342	Portland Storm	Lee Pearson	DE	Richmond
29	343	Southern California Sun	Bill Meyer	LB	Oregon
29	344	Philadelphia Bell	Zaven Yaralian	DB	Nebraska
29	345	The Hawaiians	Ernie O'Leary	RB	Nevada
29	346	Chicago Fire	Don Willingham	RB	Wisconsin–Milwaukee
29	347	Florida Blazers	Bob Rush	TE	Boston College
29	348	Detroit Wheels	Gary Yeoman	DB	Texas
30	349	Detroit Wheels	Jessie Parks	DE	Jackson State
30	350	Florida Blazers	Jim Wolf	DE	Prairie View A&M
30	351	Chicago Fire	Marv Robinson	RB	Northeast Missouri State
30	352	The Hawaiians	Danny Willis	DB	Texas Tech
30	353	Philadelphia Bell	Jimmie Kennedy	TE	Colorado State
30	354	Southern California Sun	Jim Baker	LB	Arizona State
30	355	Portland Storm	Rich Dillard	RB	New Mexico
30	356	Birmingham Americans	Eddie McCartney	TE	Northeastern State
30	357	Memphis Southmen	Paul Miles	RB	Bowling Green
30	358	Jacksonville Sharks	Dick Williams	WR	Abilene Christian
30	359	New York Stars	Dale Cangelosi	DB	LSU
30	360	Houston Texans	Bob Van Duyne	TE	Idaho
31	361	Houston Texans	Dave Means	DT	Southeast Missouri State
31	362	New York Stars	Jim Hovey	LB	Kentucky
31	363	Jacksonville Sharks	John Osborne	DB	Bethune–Cookman
31	364	Memphis Southmen	Phil Polak	RB	Bowling Green
31	365	Birmingham Americans	Bob Gaddis	WR	Mississippi Valley State
31	366	Portland Storm	John Hardin	LB	Wake Forest
31	367	Southern California Sun	Ted Jornov	LB	Iowa State
31	368	Philadelphia Bell	Molly McGee	RB	Rhode Island
31	369	The Hawaiians	George Smith	RB	Texas Tech
31	370	Chicago Fire	Garvin Roberson	WR	Illinois
31	371	Florida Blazers	Mark Sheridan	WR	Holy Cross
31	372	Detroit Wheels	Larry Cates	DB	Western Michigan
32	373	Detroit Wheels	Jim Rathje	RB	Northern Michigan
32	374	Florida Blazers	Dave Parham	G	Ole Miss
32	375	Chicago Fire	Mick Heinrich	DE	Illinois
32	376	The Hawaiians	Wally Molifua	G	BYU
32	377	Philadelphia Bell	Don Calhoun	RB	Kansas State
32	378	Southern California Sun	Jim Buckmon	DE	Pittsburgh
32	379	Portland Storm	Darryl Stewart	DB	Oklahoma State
32	380	Birmingham Americans	Ron Foxx	LB	Alabama A&M
32	381	Memphis Southmen	Steve Joachim	QB	Temple
32	382	Jacksonville Sharks	Joel Parker	TE	Florida
32	383	New York Stars	Deryl McGallion	LB	Houston
32	384	Houston Texans	LeFrancis Arnold	DT	Oregon
33	385	Houston Texans	Bill Bryant	DB	Grambling State
33	386	New York Stars	Dave McMakin	DB	Alabama
33	387	Jacksonville Sharks	Arthur Jones	TE	Florida
33	388	Memphis Southmen	Brian Rollins	WR	Iowa
33	389	Birmingham Americans	Frank Kolch	QB	Eastern Michigan
33	390	Portland Storm	Cliff Greenfield	DE	Morgan State
33	391	Southern California Sun	Mike Bolliger	G	Oregon
33	392	Philadelphia Bell	Gary Keller	DT	Utah
33	393	The Hawaiians	Russ Brown	K	William & Mary
33	394	Chicago Fire	Delario Robinson	WR	Kansas
33	395	Florida Blazers	Dave Simonson	T	Minnesota
33	396	Detroit Wheels	Howard Ebow	DB	Houston
34	397	Detroit Wheels	Randy Walker	K	Northwestern State
34	398	Florida Blazers	Pat Kelly	LB	Richmond
34	399	Chicago Fire	Blair Conway	K	Ohio State
34	400	The Hawaiians	George Hayduk	DE	Notre Dame
34	401	Philadelphia Bell	Randy Hall	DB	Idaho
34	402	Southern California Sun	Darold Nogle	WR	San Diego State
34	403	Portland Storm	Ken Johnson	QB	Colorado
34	404	Birmingham Americans	Mike Monos	LB	Miami (OH)
34	405	Memphis Southmen	Dave Thomas	DB	Texas Southern
34	406	Jacksonville Sharks	Glenn Hyde	G	Pittsburgh
34	407	New York Stars	Riley Moore	DE	Tennessee State
34	408	Houston Texans	Rick Hayes	T	Washington
35	409	Houston Texans	Ken Pettiford	QB	Tennessee State
35	410	New York Stars	Steve Frager	T	Brown
35	411	Jacksonville Sharks	Vince Kendrick	RB	Florida
35	412	Memphis Southmen	Barry Price	DT	Oklahoma State
35	413	Birmingham Americans	Ken Payne	WR	Langston
35	414	Portland Storm	Gary Lacy	RB	Baylor
35	415	Southern California Sun	Mike McCauley	DB	San Diego State
35	416	Philadelphia Bell	John Givens	DT	Villanova
35	417	The Hawaiians	Grady Richardson	TE	Cal State Fullerton
35	418	Chicago Fire	Gordy Lofquist	LB	South Dakota State
35	419	Florida Blazers	LeRoy Hegge	DE	South Dakota–Springfield
35	420	Detroit Wheels	Rick Murphy	DB	Indiana State
36	421	Detroit Wheels	Randy Grossman	TE	Temple
36	422	Florida Blazers	Eddie Richardson	WR	Howard
36	423	Chicago Fire	Rick Sievers	DB	Wake Forest
36	424	The Hawaiians	Scott Haneberg	T	Hawaii
36	425	Philadelphia Bell	Tim Rudnick	DB	Notre Dame
36	426	Southern California Sun	Greg Moses	WR	San Diego State
36	427	Portland Storm	Porter Williams	WR	Western Kentucky
36	428	Birmingham Americans	Maurice Spencer	DB	North Carolina Central
36	429	Memphis Southmen	Efren Herrera	K	UCLA
36	430	Jacksonville Sharks	Lenny Lucas	DB	UNLV
36	431	New York Stars	Damond Mays	RB	Michigan State
36	432	Houston Texans	Randy Woodfield	WR	Portland State
