= 1974 Kansas City Chiefs season =

NFL team season

- Owner: Lamar Hunt
- General manager: Jack Steadman
- Head coach: Hank Stram
- Home stadium: Arrowhead Stadium

Results
- Record: 5–9
- Division place: 3rd AFC West
- Playoffs: Did not qualify
- Pro Bowlers: C Jack Rudnay; LB Willie Lanier; CB Emmitt Thomas

The 1974 Kansas City Chiefs season was the franchise's fifth season in the National Football League, the twelfth season in Kansas City Chiefs, and the fifteenth overall, it ended with a 5–9 record and the Chiefs missed the playoffs for the third straight season consecutive and third-place finish in the AFC West, Hank Stram was fired after the season and was replaced by Paul Wiggin in 1975.

While the club's new facility at Arrowhead Stadium was drawing rave reviews, the Chiefs roster was beginning to show its age. The result was the team's first losing season in eleven years as the club was unable to string together consecutive victories during the year, a first in franchise history. Many of the club's key players were entering the twilight of their careers: Len Dawson was 39, Jim Tyrer was 35, Bobby Bell, Buck Buchanan, and Ed Budde were 34, Dave Hill was 33 and Otis Taylor was 32.

One of the year's notable players in the 5–9 season was cornerback Emmitt Thomas, who led the league with a franchise-record 12 interceptions. The final game of the 1974 campaign marked the final time all seven of Kansas City's Pro Football Hall of Fame players from the club's AFL champion era took the field together with coach Hank Stram. Including owner Lamar Hunt and seven future Minnesota Vikings Hall of Famers, a total of 16 Hall of Fame inductees were involved in that 1974 season finale game. That 35–15 loss against Minnesota provided a conclusion to Hank Stram's coaching career in Kansas City. Three days later, Stram, the only head coach in franchise history was relieved of his duties on December 27 after compiling a 124–76–10 regular season record with the club.

== Offseason ==
=== NFL draft ===
1974 Kansas City Chiefs draft
Round	Selection	Player	Position	College
1	16	Woody Green	Running back	Arizona State
2	41	Charlie Getty	Tackle	Penn State
3	66	David Jaynes	Quarterback	Kansas
4	94	Matt Herkenhoff	Tackle	Penn State
6	131	Jim Washington	Running back	Clemson
7	172	Leroy Hegge	Defensive end	South Dakota–Springfield
9	222	Jim Jennings	Running back	Rutgers
10	134	Tom Condon	Guard	Boston College
11	275	Bob Thornbladh	Running back	Michigan
12	300	Carl Brown	Wide receiver	West Texas A&M
13	328	Norm Romagnoli	Linebacker	Kentucky State
14	353	Frank Pomarico	Guard	Notre Dame
15	378	Lem Burnham	Linebacker	U. S. International
16	405	Barry Beers	Guard	William & Mary
17	431	David Langner	Defensive back	Auburn

== Roster ==
1974 Kansas City Chiefs roster
Quarterbacks (QB): 9 Dean Carlson; 16 Len Dawson; 10 Mike Livingston; Running backs (RB): 27 Woody Green; 38 Wendell Hayes; 31 Jeff Kinney; 30 Cleo Miller; 22 Donnie Joe Morris; 43 Bill Thomas; Wide receivers (WR): 83 Larry Brunson; 80 Andy Hamilton; 85 Barry Pearson; 89 Otis Taylor; 17 Elmo Wright; Tight ends (TE): 87 John Strada; 88 Morris Stroud	Offensive linemen (OL): 71 Ed Budde G; 65 Tom Condon G; 60 George Daney G; 76 Tom Drougas T; 77 Charlie Getty T; 52 Tommy Humphrey C; 70 Jim Nicholson T; 75 Francis Peay T; 58 Jack Rudnay C; Defensive linemen (DL): 84 Bob Briggs DE; 86 Buck Buchanan DT; 69 Fred DeBernardi DE; 74 Tom Keating DT; 79 John Matuszak DT; 81 Marvin Upshaw DE; 99 Wilbur Young DE	Linebackers (LB): 78 Bobby Bell OLB; 56 Tom Graham OLB; 63 Willie Lanier MLB; 51 Jim Lynch OLB; 57 Al Palewicz OLB; 50 Bob Thornbladh MLB; 54 Clyde Werner OLB; Defensive backs (DB): 48 Nate Allen CB; 32 Doug Jones SS; 46 Jim Kearney SS; 47 Willie Osley CB; 20 Mike Sensibaugh FS; 18 Emmitt Thomas CB; Special teams (ST): 3 Jan Stenerud K; 44 Jerrel Wilson P	Reserve: 82 Gary Butler TE (IR); 24 Willie Ellison RB Retired; 73 Dave Hill T (IR); 12 David Jaynes QB (IR); 87 John Lohmeyer DT (IR); 40 Jim Marsalis CB (IR); 14 Ed Podolak RB (IR); -- Bruce Polen S (IR); 15 Kerry Reardon CB (IR); 72 Wayne Walton T (IR); Rookies in italics

== Preseason ==
Week	Date	Opponent	Result	Record	Venue	Attendance	Recap
1	August 5	Detroit Lions	W 20–12	1–0	Arrowhead Stadium	35,521	Recap
2	August 12	Buffalo Bills	L 21–35	1–1	Arrowhead Stadium	39,248	Recap
3	August 17	at Los Angeles Rams	L 16–58	1–2	Los Angeles Memorial Coliseum	48,848	Recap
4	August 24	San Francisco 49ers	W 26–7	2–2	Arrowhead Stadium	46,548	Recap
5	August 31	at Dallas Cowboys	L 16–25	2–3	Texas Stadium	43,492	Recap
6	September 6	St. Louis Cardinals	W 31–16	3–3	Arrowhead Stadium	46,067	Recap

== Regular season ==
=== Schedule ===
Week	Date	Opponent	Result	Record	Venue	Attendance	Recap
1	September 15	New York Jets	**W** 24–16	1–0	Arrowhead Stadium	74,854	Recap
2	September 22	at **Oakland Raiders**	**L** 7–27	1–1	Oakland–Alameda County Coliseum	48,108	Recap
3	September 29	at Houston Oilers	**W** 17–7	2–1	Houston Astrodome	28,538	Recap
4	October 6	**Denver Broncos**	**L** 14–17	2–2	Arrowhead Stadium	67,298	Recap
5	October 13	Pittsburgh Steelers	**L** 24–34	2–3	Arrowhead Stadium	65,517	Recap
6	October 20	at Miami Dolphins	**L** 3–9	2–4	Miami Orange Bowl	67,779	Recap
7	October 27	at **San Diego Chargers**	**W** 24–14	3–4	San Diego Stadium	34,371	Recap
8	November 3	New York Giants	**L** 27–33	3–5	Arrowhead Stadium	61,437	Recap
9	November 10	**San Diego Chargers**	**L** 7–14	3–6	Arrowhead Stadium	48,551	Recap
10	November 18	at **Denver Broncos**	**W** 42–34	4–6	Mile High Stadium	50,236	Recap
11	November 24	at Cincinnati Bengals	**L** 6–33	4–7	Riverfront Stadium	49,777	Recap
12	December 1	at St. Louis Cardinals	**W** 17–13	5–7	Busch Memorial Stadium	41,863	Recap
13	December 8	**Oakland Raiders**	**L** 6–7	5–8	Arrowhead Stadium	60,577	Recap
14	December 14	Minnesota Vikings	**L** 15–35	5–9	Arrowhead Stadium	35,480	Recap
Note: Intra-division opponents are in **bold** text.

=== Game summaries ===
==== Week 1: vs. New York Jets ====
Week 1: New York Jets at Kansas City Chiefs – Game summary

Quarter	1	2	3	4	Total
Jets	6	10	0	0	**16**
**Chiefs**	0	14	3	7	**24**

at Arrowhead Stadium, Kansas City, Missouri

- Date: September 15
- Game time: 3:00 p.m. CDT
- Game weather: Partly cloudy, 70 °F (21 °C)
- Game attendance: 74,854
- Referee: Tommy Bell
- TV announcers (NBC): Jim Simpson and John Brodie
- Box Score

Game information

**First quarter**

- NYJ – Rich Caster 2-yard pass from Joe Namath (kick blocked), 2:55. Jets 6–0. **Drive: 8 plays, 45 yards, 3:52.**

**Second quarter**

- NYJ – Eddie Bell 7-yard pass from Joe Namath (Bobby Howfield kick), 11:07. Jets 13–0. **Drive: 4 plays, 37 yards, 1:02.**
- KC – Ed Podolak 2-yard run (Jan Stenerud kick), 4:54. Jets 13–7. **Drive: 5 plays, 46 yards, 1:44.**
- NYJ – Bobby Howfield 25-yard field goal, 0:38. Jets 16–7. **Drive: 9 plays, 63 yards, 4:16.**
- KC – Marvin Upshaw 52-yard interception return (Jan Stenerud kick), 0:10. Jets 16–14.

**Third quarter**

- KC – Jan Stenerud 27-yard field goal, 2:59. Chiefs 17–16. **Drive: 13 plays, 74 yards, 6:06.**

**Fourth quarter**

- KC – Emmitt Thomas 38-yard interception return (Jan Stenerud kick), 1:52. Chiefs 24–16.

Top passers

- NYJ – Joe Namath – 14/30, 210 yards, 2 TD, 4 INT
- KC – Len Dawson – 9/21, 119 yards, 2 INT

Top rushers

- NYJ – John Riggins – 22 rushes, 116 yards
- KC – Wendell Hayes – 8 rushes, 58 yards

Top receivers

- NYJ – Rich Caster – 3 receptions, 72 yards, TD
- KC – Larry Brunson – 3 receptions, 43 yards

==== Week 2: at Oakland Raiders ====
Week 2: Kansas City Chiefs at Oakland Raiders – Game summary

Quarter	1	2	3	4	Total
Chiefs	0	0	7	0	**7**
**Raiders**	7	13	0	7	**27**

at Oakland–Alameda County Coliseum, Oakland, California

- Date: September 22
- Game time: 1:00 p.m. PDT
- Game weather: Clear, 61 °F (16 °C)
- Game attendance: 48,108
- Referee: Fred Silva
- TV announcers (NBC): Curt Gowdy and Al DeRogatis
- Box Score

Game information

**First quarter**

- OAK – Dave Casper 5 yard pass from Ken Stabler (George Blanda kick), 6:12. Raiders 7–0. **Drive: 10 plays, 80 yards, 3:57.**

**Second quarter**

- OAK – Mike Siani 9 yard pass from Ken Stabler (George Blanda kick), 10:46. Raiders 14–0. **Drive: 5 plays, 62 yards, 1:51.**
- OAK – Pete Banaszak 20 yard run (kick failed, wide left), 6:05. Raiders 20–0. **Drive: 3 plays, 36 yards, 0:50.**

**Third quarter**

- KC – Wilbur Young 52 yard interception return (Jan Stenerud kick), 13:47. Raiders 20–7.

**Fourth quarter**

- OAK – Dave Casper 2 yard pass from Ken Stabler (George Blanda kick), 11:28. Raiders 27–7. **Drive: 2 plays, 8 yards, 0:50.**

Top passers

- KC – Len Dawson – 7/13, 49 yards, 3 INT
- OAK – Ken Stabler – 11/25, 165 yards, 3 TD, 2 INT

Top rushers

- KC – Wendell Hayes – 7 rushes, 33 yards
- OAK – Pete Banaszak – 6 rushes, 39 yards, TD

Top receivers

- KC – Otis Taylor – 2 receptions, 25 yards
- OAK – Cliff Branch – 3 receptions, 70 yards

==== Week 3: at Houston Oilers ====
Week 3: Kansas City Chiefs at Houston Oilers – Game summary

Quarter	1	2	3	4	Total
**Chiefs**	0	0	3	14	**17**
Oilers	0	0	7	0	**7**

at Houston Astrodome, Houston, Texas

- Date: September 29
- Game time: 1:00 p.m. CDT
- Game weather: None (indoor stadium)
- Game attendance: 28,538
- Referee: Norm Schachter
- TV announcers (NBC): Al Michaels and Mike Haffner
- Box Score

Game information

**First quarter**

- No scoring plays.

**Second quarter**

- No scoring plays.

**Third quarter**

- HOU – Ronnie Coleman 1-yard run (Skip Butler kick), 6:27. Oilers 7–0. **Drive: 13 plays, 89 yards, 8:33.**
- KC – Jan Stenerud 35-yard field goal, 2:11. Oilers 7–3. **Drive: 8 plays, 56 yards, 4:16.**

**Fourth quarter**

- KC – Willie Ellison 8-yard run (Jan Stenerud kick), 7:02. Chiefs 10–7. **Drive: 13 plays, 80 yards, 7:07.**
- KC – Morris Stroud 8-yard pass from Mike Livingston (Jan Stenerud kick), 2:41. Chiefs 17–7. **Drive: 3 plays, 4 yards, 1:07.**

Top passers

- KC – Mike Livingston – 20/26, 167 yards, TD
- HOU – Lynn Dickey – 19/33, 178 yards, 2 INT

Top rushers

- KC – Willie Ellison – 10 rushes, 20 yards, 1 TD
- HOU – Ronnie Coleman – 9 rushes, 27 yards, TD

Top receivers

- KC – Ed Podolak – 10 receptions, 64 yards
- HOU – Billy Johnson – 4 receptions, 57 yards

==== Week 4: vs. Denver Broncos ====
Week 4: Denver Broncos at Kansas City Chiefs – Game summary

Quarter	1	2	3	4	Total
**Broncos**	3	0	7	7	**17**
Chiefs	7	7	0	0	**14**

at Arrowhead Stadium, Kansas City, Missouri

- Date: October 6
- Game time: 3:00 p.m. CDT
- Game weather: Overcast, 52 °F (11 °C)
- Game attendance: 67,298
- Referee: Jim Tunney
- TV announcers (NBC): Ross Porter and Willie Davis
- Box Score

Game information

**First quarter**

- DEN – Jim Turner 41-yard field goal, 7:31. Broncos 3–0. **Drive: 4 plays, 7 yards, 0:59.**
- KC – Willie Ellison 1 yard run (Jan Stenerud kick), 4:19. Chiefs 7–3. **Drive: 8 plays, 59 yards, 3:12.**

**Second quarter**

- KC – Bobby Bell 28-yard interception return (Jan Stenerud kick), 8:09. Chiefs 14–3.

**Third quarter**

- DEN – Jon Keyworth 2-yard run (Jim Turner kick), 2:33. Chiefs 14–10. **Drive: 3 plays, 36 yards, 0:56.**

**Fourth quarter**

- DEN – Jon Keyworth 3-yard run (Jim Turner kick), 10:46. Broncos 17–14. **Drive: 3 plays, 11 yards, 0:57.**

Top passers

- DEN – Steve Ramsey – 4/9, 63 yards
- KC – Mike Livingston – 10/19, 97 yards, INT

Top rushers

- DEN – Otis Armstrong – 14 rushes, 48 yards
- KC – Ed Podolak – 14 rushes, 47 yards

Top receivers

- DEN – Floyd Little – 1 reception, 34 yards
- KC – Elmo Wright – 1 reception, 40 yards

Chiefs record their first home loss to the Broncos after winning the previous 14 consecutive home meetings.

==== Week 5: vs. Pittsburgh Steelers ====
Week 5: Pittsburgh Steelers at Kansas City Chiefs – Game summary

Quarter	1	2	3	4	Total
**Steelers**	7	17	10	0	**34**
Chiefs	3	7	7	7	**24**

at Arrowhead Stadium, Kansas City, Missouri

- Date: October 13
- Game time: 1:00 p.m. CDT
- Game weather: Cloudy, light rain, 61 °F (16 °C)
- Game attendance: 65,517
- Referee: Bernie Ulman
- TV announcers (KDKA): Dick Stockton and Bill Currie
- Box Score

Game information

**First quarter**

- KC – Jan Stenerud 31 yard field goal, 9:56. Chiefs 3–0. **Drive: 7 plays, 18 yards, 2:46.**
- PIT – Rocky Bleier 2-yard run (Roy Gerela kick), 4:13 Steelers 7–3. **Drive: 6 plays, 34 yards.**

**Second quarter**

- KC – Barry Pearson 13-yard pass from Mike Livingston (Jan Stenerud kick), 14:56. Chiefs 10–7. **Drive: 5 plays, 48 yards, 1:58.**
- PIT – Preston Pearson 3-yard run (Roy Gerela kick), 8:51. Steelers 14–10. **Drive: 5 plays, 24 yards, 1:56.**
- PIT – Glen Edwards 49-yard interception return (Roy Gerela kick), 6:24. Steelers 21–10.
- PIT – Roy Gerela 32-yard field goal, 2:19. Steelers 24–10. **Drive: 7 plays, 18 yards, 2:29.**

**Third quarter**

- KC – Otis Taylor 10-yard pass from Mike Livingston (Jan Stenerud kick), 6:28. Steelers 24–17. **Drive: 10 plays, 83 yards, 4:48.**
- PIT – Roy Gerela 45-yard field goal, 2:41. Steelers 27–17. **Drive: 13 plays, 43 yards, 3:35.**
- PIT – Frank Lewis 31-yard pass from Joe Gilliam (Roy Gerela kick), 1:05. Steelers 34–17. **Drive: 3 plays, 33 yards, 1:18.**

**Fourth quarter**

- KC – Elmo Wright 13-yard pass from Mike Livingston (Jan Stenerud kick), 14:57. Steelers 34–24. **Drive: 4 plays, 53 yards, 1:08.**

Top passers

- PIT – Joe Gilliam – 14/36, 214 yards, TD, INT
- KC – Mike Livingston – 15/43, 243 yards, 3 TD, 5 INT

Top rushers

- PIT – Rocky Bleier – 12 rushes, 45 yards, TD
- KC – Willie Ellison – 7 rushes, 26 yards

Top receivers

- PIT – Frank Lewis – 3 receptions, 55 yards, TD
- KC – Barry Pearson – 4 receptions, 92 yards, TD

==== Week 6: at Miami Dolphins ====
Week 6: Kansas City Chiefs at Miami Dolphins – Game summary

Quarter	1	2	3	4	Total
Chiefs	0	3	0	0	**3**
**Dolphins**	0	2	0	7	**9**

at Miami Orange Bowl, Miami, Florida

- Date: October 20
- Game time: 4:00 p.m. EDT
- Game weather: Clear, 80 °F (27 °C)
- Game attendance: 67,779
- Referee: Fred Swearingen
- TV announcers (NBC): Al Michaels and Mike Haffner
- Box Score

Game information

**First quarter**

- No scoring plays.

**Second quarter**

- KC – Jan Stenerud 21-yard field goal, 9:57. Chiefs 3–0. **Drive: 17 plays, 65 yards, 9:24.**
- MIA – Punt blocked by Tim Foley out of bounds in end zone for a Safety, 2:14. Chiefs 3–2.

**Third quarter**

- No scoring plays.

**Fourth quarter**

- MIA – Larry Csonka 1-yard run (Garo Yepremian kick), 0:17. Dolphins 9–3. **Drive: 7 plays, 53 yards, 1:48.**

Top passers

- KC – Mike Livingston – 5/11, 64 yards, INT
- MIA – Bob Griese – 11/25, 120 yards, 3 INT

Top rushers

- KC – Woody Green – 24 rushes, 98 yards
- MIA – Larry Csonka – 17 rushes, 80 yards, TD

Top receivers

- KC – Barry Pearson – 3 receptions, 26 yards
- MIA – Nat Moore – 2 receptions, 32 yards

==== Week 7: at San Diego Chargers ====
Week 7: Kansas City Chiefs at San Diego Chargers – Game summary

Quarter	1	2	3	4	Total
**Chiefs**	0	7	7	10	**24**
Chargers	7	0	0	7	**14**

at San Diego Stadium, San Diego, California

- Date: October 27
- Game time: 1:00 p.m. PST
- Game weather: Cloudy, 60 °F (16 °C)
- Game attendance: 34,371
- Referee: Bob Frederic
- TV announcers (NBC): Ross Porter and Willie Davis
- Box score

Game information

**First quarter**

- SD – Gary Garrison 18-yard pass from Dan Fouts (Dennis Partee kick), 0:04. Chargers 7–0. **Drive: 9 plays, 78 yards, 4:09.**

**Second quarter**

- KC – Elmo Wright 12-yard run (Jan Stenerud kick), 11:49. Tied 7–7. **Drive: 9 plays, 70 yards, 3:15.**

**Third quarter**

- KC – Woody Green 2-yard run (Jan Stenerud kick), 10:13. Chiefs 14–7. **Drive: 9 plays, 67 yards, 4:47.**

**Fourth quarter**

- SD – Don Woods 6-yard run (Dennis Partee kick), 12:06. Tied 14–14. **Drive: 11 plays, 64 yards, 5:29.**
- KC – Woody Green 69-yard pass from Len Dawson (Jan Stenerud kick), 10:24. Chiefs 21–14. **Drive: 3 plays, 90 yards, 1:42.**
- KC – Jan Stenerud 23-yard field goal, 0:58. Chiefs 24–14. **Drive: 12 plays, 62 yards, 5:31.**

Top passers

- KC – Len Dawson – 4/4, 84 yards, TD
- SD – Dan Fouts – 14/27, 221 yards, TD, 2 INT

Top rushers

- KC – Woody Green – 23 rushes, 146 yards, TD
- SD – Don Woods – 22 rushes, 154 yards, TD

Top receivers

- KC – Woody Green – 4 receptions, 98 yards, TD
- SD – Gary Garrison – 6 receptions, 92 yards, TD

==== Week 8: vs. New York Giants ====
Week 8: New York Giants at Kansas City Chiefs – Game summary

Quarter	1	2	3	4	Total
**Giants**	7	13	3	10	**33**
Chiefs	7	7	0	13	**27**

at Arrowhead Stadium, Kansas City, Missouri

- Date: November 3
- Game time: 3:00 p.m. CST
- Game weather: Overcast, 47 °F (8 °C)
- Game attendance: 61,437
- Referee: Pat Haggerty
- TV announcers (CBS): Don Criqui and Wayne Walker
- Box Score

Game information

**First quarter**

- KC – Woody Green 1-yard run (Jan Stenerud kick), 4:23. Chiefs 7–0. **Drive: 11 plays, 55 yards, 5:06.**
- NYG – Walker Gillette 7-yard pass from Craig Morton (Pete Gogolak kick), 0:55. Tied 7–7. **Drive: 10 plays, 69 yards, 3:25.**

**Second quarter**

- NYG – Ron Johnson 1-yard run (kick blocked), 12:09. Giants 13–7. **Drive: 7 plays, 35 yards, 2:33.**
- NYG – Ron Johnson 1-yard run (Pete Gogolak kick), 2:22. Giants 20–7. **Drive: 12 plays, 50 yards, 5:25.**
- KC – Morris Stroud 8-yard pass from Len Dawson (Jan Stenerud kick), 0:12. Tied 20–14. **Drive: 9 plays, 80 yards, 1:56.**

**Third quarter**

- NYG – Pete Gogolak 33-yard field goal, 8:29. Giants 23–14. **Drive: 4 plays, –5 yards, 1:22.**

**Fourth quarter**

- KC – Jan Stenerud 19-yard field goal, 14:20. Giants 23–17. **Drive: 12 plays, 79 yards, 3:30.**
- NYG – Pete Gogolak 35-yard field goal, 12:08. Giants 26–17. **Drive: 8 plays, 37 yards, 2:03.**
- KC – Larry Brunson 23-yard pass from Len Dawson (Jan Stenerud kick), 5:20. Giants 26–24. **Drive: 15 plays, 75 yards, 6:38.**
- NYG – Joe Dawkins 51-yard pass from Craig Morton (Pete Gogolak kick), 4:13. Giants 33–24. **Drive: 3 plays, 60 yards, 1:07.**
- KC – Jan Stenerud 42-yard field goal, 2:20. Giants 33–27. **Drive: 9 plays, 41 yards, 1:44.**

Top passers

- NYG – Craig Morton – 17/33, 256 yards, 2 TD
- KC – Len Dawson – 25/33, 238 yards, 2 TD, INT

Top rushers

- NYG – Ron Johnson – 25 rushes, 66 yards, 2 TD
- KC – Ed Podolak – 12 rushes, 73 yards

Top receivers

- NYG – Bob Grim – 4 receptions, 70 yards
- KC – Larry Brunson – 5 receptions, 82 yards, TD

==== Week 9: vs. San Diego Chargers ====
Week 9: San Diego Chargers at Kansas City Chiefs – Game summary

Quarter	1	2	3	4	Total
**Chargers**	0	7	0	7	**14**
Chiefs	0	0	0	7	**7**

at Arrowhead Stadium, Kansas City, Missouri

- Date: November 10
- Game time: 1:00 p.m. CST
- Game weather: Rain, 49 °F (9 °C)
- Game attendance: 48,551
- Referee: Tommy Bell
- TV announcers (NBC): Ross Porter and Willie Davis
- Box Score

Game information

**First quarter**

- No scoring plays.

**Second quarter**

- SD – Bo Matthews 1-yard run (Dennis Partee kick), 6:19. Chargers 7–0. **Drive: 14 plays, 52 yards, 7:27.**

**Third quarter**

- No scoring plays.

**Fourth quarter**

- KC – Larry Brunson 84-yard pass from Len Dawson (Jan Stenerud kick), 10:03. Tied 7–7. **Drive: 3 plays, 87 yards, 0:54.**
- SD – Gary Garrison 71-yard pass from Jesse Freitas (Dennis Partee kick), 9:02. Chargers 14–7. **Drive: 2 plays, 73 yards, 1:01.**

Top passers

- SD – Jesse Freitas Jr. – 6/15, 120 yards, TD, 2 INT
- KC – Len Dawson – 26/44, 381 yards, TD, INT

Top rushers

- SD – Bo Matthews – 21 rushes, 73 yards, TD
- KC – Woody Green – 19 rushes, 54 yards

Top receivers

- SD – Gary Garrison – 2 receptions, 84 yards, TD
- KC – Larry Brunson – 8 receptions, 193 yards, TD

==== Week 10: at Denver Broncos ====
Week 10: Kansas City Chiefs at Denver Broncos – Game summary

Quarter	1	2	3	4	Total
**Chiefs**	7	10	19	6	**42**
Broncos	7	14	0	13	**34**

at Mile High Stadium, Denver, Colorado

- Date: November 18
- Game time: 7:00 p.m. MST
- Game weather: Cloudy, 50 °F (10 °C)
- Game attendance: 50,236
- Referee: Norm Schachter
- TV announcers (ABC): Frank Gifford, Alex Karras and Howard Cosell
- Box Score

Game information

**First quarter**

- DEN – Jon Keyworth 1-yard run (Jim Turner kick), 5:51. Broncos 7–0. **Drive: 7 plays, 65 yards, 3:18.**
- KC – Ed Podolak 4-yard pass from Len Dawson (Jan Stenerud kick), 1:13. Tied 7–7. **Drive: 9 plays, 78 yards, 4:38.**

**Second quarter**

- DEN – Jon Keyworth 1-yard run (Jim Turner kick), 12:40. Broncos 14–7. **Drive: 8 plays, 58 yards, 3:24.**
- KC – Ed Podolak 2-yard run (Jan Stenerud kick), 7:25. Tied 14–14. **Drive: 4 plays, 17 yards, 1:33.**
- DEN – Billy Van Heusen 11-yard pass from Charley Johnson (Jim Turner kick), 4:42. Broncos 21–14. **Drive: 6 plays, 58 yards, 2:34.**
- KC – Jan Stenerud 41-yard field goal, 1:50. Broncos 21–17. **Drive: 8 plays, 45 yards, 2:52.**

**Third quarter**

- KC – Otis Armstrong tackled in end zone by Willie Lanier for a Safety, 12:02. Broncos 21–19.
- KC – Otis Taylor 35-yard pass from Len Dawson (Jan Stenerud kick), 10:08. Chiefs 26–21. **Drive: 5 plays, 49 yards, 3:36.**
- KC – Woody Green 17-yard run (Jan Stenerud kick). Chiefs 33–21. **Drive: 1 play, 17 yards, 0:07.**
- KC – Jan Stenerud 35-yard field goal, 1:53. Chiefs 36–21. **Drive: 6 plays, 33 yards, 2:47.**

**Fourth quarter**

- DEN – Jon Keyworth 1-yard run (kick blocked), 14:58. Chiefs 36–27. **Drive: 4 plays, 59 yards, 1:44.**
- KC – Wendell Hayes 1-yard run (kick failed), 11:59. Chiefs 42–27. **Drive: 8 plays, 61 yards, 2:59.**
- DEN – Otto Stowe 4-yard pass from Charley Johnson (Jim Turner kick), 7:50. Chiefs 42–34. **Drive: 7 plays, 80 yards, 4:09.**

Top passers

- KC – Len Dawson – 19/30, 188 yards, 2 TD, INT
- DEN – Charley Johnson – 28/42, 445 yards, 2 TD, 2 INT

Top rushers

- KC – Woody Green – 18 rushes, 114 yards, TD
- DEN – Otis Armstrong – 16 rushes, 55 yards

Top receivers

- KC – Otis Taylor – 3 receptions, 55 yards, TD
- DEN – Riley Odoms – 7 receptions, 125 yards

==== Week 11: at Cincinnati Bengals ====
Week 11: Kansas City Chiefs at Cincinnati Bengals – Game summary

Quarter	1	2	3	4	Total
Chiefs	0	6	0	0	**6**
**Bengals**	7	20	0	6	**33**

at Riverfront Stadium, Cincinnati, Ohio

- Date: November 24
- Game time: 1:00 p.m. EST
- Game weather: Cloudy, 53 °F (12 °C)
- Game attendance: 49,777
- Referee: Bernie Ulman
- TV announcers (NBC): Jim Simpson and John Brodie
- Box Score

Game information

**First quarter**

- CIN – Isaac Curtis 18-yard pass from Ken Anderson (Horst Muhlmann kick), 11:13. Bengals 7–0. **Drive: 4 plays, 46 yards, 1:34.**

**Second quarter**

- CIN – Ed Williams 19-yard pass from Ken Anderson (Horst Muhlmann kick), 14:52. Bengals 14–0. **Drive: 8 plays, 70 yards, 4:23.**
- CIN – Bob Maddox blocked punt recovery in end zone (kick failed), 5:14. Bengals 20–0.
- KC – Jan Stenerud 27-yard field goal, 3:33. Bengals 20–3. **Drive: 6 plays, 56 yards, 1:29.**
- CIN – Isaac Curtis 6-yard pass from Ken Anderson (Horst Muhlmann kick), 0:54. Bengals 27–3. **Drive: 7 plays, 76 yards, 2:39.**
- KC – Jan Stenerud 47-yard field goal, 0:00. Bengals 27–6. **Drive: 7 plays, 50 yards, 0:54.**

**Third quarter**

- No scoring plays.

**Fourth quarter**

- CIN – Chip Myers 11-yard pass from Ken Anderson (kick aborted), 11:05. Bengals 33–6. **Drive: 13 plays, 80 yards, 5:36.**

Top passers

- KC – Len Dawson – 13/25, 179 yards
- CIN – Ken Anderson – 19/33, 262 yards, 4 TD, INT

Top rushers

- KC – Woody Green – 8 rushes, 20 yards
- CIN – Ed Williams – 20 rushes, 96 yards

Top receivers

- KC – Otis Taylor – 3 receptions, 88 yards
- CIN – Charlie Joiner – 3 receptions, 65 yards

==== Week 12: at St. Louis Cardinals ====
Week 12: Kansas City Chiefs at St. Louis Cardinals – Game summary

Quarter	1	2	3	4	Total
**Chiefs**	0	0	7	10	**17**
Cardinals	6	0	0	7	**13**

at Busch Stadium, St. Louis, Missouri

- Date: December 1
- Game time: 1:00 p.m. CST
- Game weather: Snow, 31 °F (−1 °C)
- Game attendance: 41,863
- Referee: Fred Silva
- TV announcers (NBC): Jay Randolph and Paul Maguire
- Box Score

Game information

**First quarter**

- STL – Terry Metcalf 22-yard pass from Jim Hart (kick failed, wide right), 6:57. Cardinals 6–0. **Drive: 6 plays, 65 yards, 3:08.**

**Second quarter**

- No scoring plays.

**Third quarter**

- KC – Jeff Kinney 4-yard pass from Len Dawson (Jan Stenerud kick), 7:19. Chiefs 7–6. **Drive: 4 plays, 32 yards, 1:45.**

**Fourth quarter**

- KC – Wendell Hayes 1-yard run (Jan Stenerud kick), 13:24. Chiefs 14–6. **Drive: 2 plays, 3 yards, 0:39.**
- KC – Jan Stenerud 22-yard field goal, 3:52. Chiefs 17–6. **Drive: 12 plays, 75 yards, 5:36.**
- STL – Terry Metcalf 2-yard run (Jim Bakken kick), 2:49. Chiefs 17–13. **Drive: 5 plays, 62 yards, 1:03.**

Top passers

- KC – Len Dawson – 13/22, 93 yards, TD, INT
- STL – Jim Hart – 19/39, 194 yards, TD, 2 INT

Top rushers

- KC – Cleo Miller – 15 rushes, 95 yards
- STL – Jim Otis – 14 rushes, 46 yards

Top receivers

- KC – Otis Taylor – 2 receptions, 29 yards
- STL – Terry Metcalf – 9 receptions, 85 yards, TD

==== Week 13: vs. Oakland Raiders ====
Week 13: Oakland Raiders at Kansas City Chiefs – Game summary

Quarter	1	2	3	4	Total
**Raiders**	0	0	0	7	**7**
Chiefs	3	3	0	0	**6**

at Arrowhead Stadium, Kansas City, Missouri

- Date: December 8
- Game time: 3:00 p.m. CST
- Game weather: Clear, cold, 27 °F (−3 °C)
- Game attendance: 60,577
- Referee: Ben Dreith
- TV announcers (NBC): Jim Simpson and John Brodie
- Box Score

Game information

**First quarter**

- KC – Jan Stenerud 50-yard field goal, 4:06. Chiefs 3–0. **Drive: 4 plays, 5 yards, 3:24.**

**Second quarter**

- KC – Jan Stenerud 27-yard field goal, 0:02. Chiefs 6–0. **Drive: 8 plays, 51 yards, 1:08.**

**Third quarter**

- No scoring plays.

**Fourth quarter**

- OAK – Cliff Branch 10-yard pass from Daryle Lamonica (George Blanda kick), 10:16. Raiders 7–6. **Drive: 2 plays, 10 yards, 0:45.**

Top passers

- OAK – Daryle Lamonica – 2/7, 22 yards, TD, 3 INT
- KC – Len Dawson – 12/23, 126 yards, 2 INT

Top rushers

- OAK – Marv Hubbard – 17 rushes, 87 yards
- KC – Jeff Kinney – 21 rushes, 124 yards

Top receivers

- OAK – Mark van Eeghen – 1 reception, 12 yards
- KC – Otis Taylor – 4 receptions, 60 yards

==== Week 14: vs Minnesota Vikings ====
Week 14: Minnesota Vikings at Kansas City Chiefs – Game summary

Quarter	1	2	3	4	Total
**Vikings**	0	14	7	14	**35**
Chiefs	3	9	0	3	**15**

at Arrowhead Stadium, Kansas City, Missouri

- Date: December 14
- Game time: 2:45 p.m. CST
- Game weather: Partly cloudy, 42 °F (6 °C)
- Game attendance: 35,480
- Referee: Jim Tunney
- TV announcers (CBS): Lindsey Nelson and John Sauer
- Box Score

Game information

**First quarter**

- KC – Jan Stenerud 37-yard field goal, 8:41. Chiefs 3–0. **Drive: 11 plays, 60 yards, 6:19.**

**Second quarter**

- KC – Jan Stenerud 32-yard field goal, 8:50. Chiefs 6–0. **Drive: 13 plays, 58 yards, 5:57.**
- MIN – Sam McCullum 34-yard pass from Fran Tarkenton (Fred Cox kick), 3:01. Vikings 7–6. **Drive: 6 plays, 65 yards, 3:00.**
- MIN – Sam McCullum 10-yard pass from Fran Tarkenton (Fred Cox kick), 0:33. Vikings 14–6. **Drive: 7 plays, 52 yards, 1:25.**
- KC – Emmitt Thomas 73-yard interception return (kick failed, wide right), 0:00. Vikings 14–12.

**Third quarter**

- MIN – Ed Marinaro 7-yard pass from Bob Berry (Fred Cox kick), 7:46. Vikings 21–12. **Drive: 12 plays, 65 yards, 7:14.**

**Fourth quarter**

- KC – Jan Stenerud 29-yard field goal, 14:57. Vikings 21–15. **Drive: 12 plays, 43 yards, 5:00.**
- MIN – Oscar Reed 3-yard pass from Bob Berry (Fred Cox kick), 8:36. Vikings 28–15. **Drive: 10 plays, 58 yards, 6:21.**
- MIN – Brent McClanahan 6-yard run (Fred Cox kick), 0:59. Vikings 35–15. **Drive: 9 plays, 68 yards, 3:53.**

Top passers

- MIN – Fran Tarkenton – 8/17, 135 yards, 2 TD, INT
- KC – Len Dawson – 9/16, 124 yards, INT

**Top rushers**

- MIN – Oscar Reed – 15 rushes, 57 yards
- KC – Cleo Miller – 12 rushes, 45 yards

**Top receivers**

- MIN – Sam McCullum – 6 rec, 118 yards, 2 TD
- KC – Elmo Wright – 3 rec, 75 yards

== Standings ==
AFC West
	W	L	T	PCT	DIV	CONF	PF	PA	STK
Oakland Raiders	12	2	0	.857	5–1	9–2	355	228	W3
Denver Broncos	7	6	1	.536	3–3	5–4–1	302	294	L1
Kansas City Chiefs	5	9	0	.357	2–4	4–7	233	293	L2
San Diego Chargers	5	9	0	.357	2–4	4–7	212	285	W2
