= 1974 Houston Oilers season =

NFL team season

- Owner: Bud Adams
- General manager: Sid Gillman
- Head coach: Sid Gillman
- Home stadium: Houston Astrodome

Results
- Record: 7–7
- Division place: 2nd AFC Central
- Playoffs: Did not qualify

The 1974 Houston Oilers season was the 15th season overall and fifth with the National Football League. The Oilers improved upon their previous season's 1–13 record, winning seven games. Despite the improvement, they failed to qualify for the playoffs for the fifth consecutive season.

== Offseason ==
=== NFL draft ===
1974 Houston Oilers draft
Round	Pick	Player	Position	College	Notes
4	79	Steve Manstedt	Linebacker	Nebraska	
Made roster * Made at least one Pro Bowl during career

== Roster ==
1974 Houston Oilers roster
Quarterbacks (QB): 10 Lynn Dickey; 11 Jim Foote; 7 Dan Pastorini; Running backs (RB): 12 George Amundson; 47 Ronnie Coleman; 36 Bob Gresham; 46 Jeff Queen; 24 Willie Rodgers; 23 Vic Washington; 44 Fred Willis; Wide receivers (WR): 00 Ken Burrough; 84 Billy Johnson; 20 Billy Parks; 41 Terry Wells; Tight ends (TE): 82 Mack Alston; 83 Jerry Broadnax	Offensive linemen (OL): 75 Elbert Drungo T; 69 Solomon Freelon G; 68 Brian Goodman G; 53 Fred Hoaglin C; 72 Kevin Hunt T; 61 Harris Jones G; 73 Greg Sampson T; 64 Ron Saul G; Defensive linemen (DL): 65 Elvin Bethea DE; 63 Ronnie Carroll NT; 78 Curley Culp NT; 70 Ed Fisher DE; 71 Bubba McCollum NT; 85 Tody Smith DE; 79 Jim White DE	Linebackers (LB): 52 Duane Benson OLB; 54 Gregg Bingham ILB; 76 Al Cowlings OLB; 58 Marvin Davis OLB; 57 Steve Kiner ILB; 56 Guy Roberts ILB; 59 Ted Washington OLB; Defensive backs (DB): 19 Willie Alexander CB; 48 Bob Atkins SS; 15 Al Johnson FS; 42 Tommy Maxwell SS; 22 Zeke Moore CB; 45 Jeff Severson FS; 38 C. L. Whittington SS; Special teams (ST): 4 David Beverly P; 2 Skip Butler K	Reserve: -- John Babinecz LB (IR); 53 Ron Lou C (IR); 24 Mike Montgomery WR (IR); 77 Sid Smith C (IR); -- Steve Taylor C (IR); Rookies in italics

== Schedule ==
=== Preseason ===
Due to a player's strike affecting the 1974 preseason, the Oilers, like the rest of the NFL, played the preseason using an all-rookie roster. The strike was resolved prior to the start of the regular season.

On July 16, the Oilers played a preseason game vs the minor league San Antonio Toros, marking the last time an NFL team would play a game against a minor league team. (In 1969, the Atlanta Falcons rookies would play the minor league Alabama Hawks and in 1972 the New York Jets rookies would play the minor league Long Island Chiefs)

=== Regular season ===
Week	Date	Opponent	Result	Record	Venue	Attendance	Recap
1	September 15	San Diego Chargers	**W** 21–14	1–0	Astrodome	25,317	Recap
2	September 22	at **Cleveland Browns**	**L** 7–20	1–1	Cleveland Municipal Stadium	55,242	Recap
3	September 29	Kansas City Chiefs	**L** 7–17	1–2	Astrodome	28,538	Recap
4	October 6	**Pittsburgh Steelers**	**L** 7–13	1–3	Astrodome	30,049	Recap
5	October 13	at Minnesota Vikings	**L** 10–51	1–4	Metropolitan Stadium	48,006	Recap
6	October 20	St. Louis Cardinals	**L** 27–31	1–5	Astrodome	26,371	Recap
7	October 27	at **Cincinnati Bengals**	**W** 34–21	2–5	Riverfront Stadium	55,434	Recap
8	November 3	at New York Jets	**W** 27–22	3–5	Shea Stadium	47,218	Recap
9	November 10	at Buffalo Bills	**W** 21–9	4–5	Rich Stadium	79,144	Recap
10	November 17	**Cincinnati Bengals**	**W** 20–3	5–5	Astrodome	44,054	Recap
11	November 24	Dallas Cowboys	**L** 0–10	5–6	Astrodome	49,775	Recap
12	December 1	at **Pittsburgh Steelers**	**W** 13–10	6–6	Three Rivers Stadium	41,195	Recap
13	December 8	at Denver Broncos	**L** 14-37	6–7	Mile High Stadium	46,942	Recap
14	December 15	**Cleveland Browns**	**W** 28–24	7–7	Astrodome	33,299	Recap
Note: Intra-division opponents are in **bold** text.

== Standings ==
AFC Central
	W	L	T	PCT	DIV	CONF	PF	PA	STK
Pittsburgh Steelers	10	3	1	.750	4–2	7–3–1	305	189	W2
Houston Oilers	7	7	0	.500	4–2	7–4	236	282	W1
Cincinnati Bengals	7	7	0	.500	3–3	5–6	283	259	L3
Cleveland Browns	4	10	0	.286	1–5	3–8	251	344	L2

== Season summary ==
=== Week 1 vs Chargers ===
Week One: San Diego Chargers (0–0) at Houston Oilers (0–0)

Quarter	1	2	3	4	Total
Chargers	0	7	7	0	14
Oilers	14	0	0	7	21

at Houston Astrodome, Houston, Texas

- Date: September 15
- Game time: 1:00 p.m. CST
- Game weather: Indoors (dome)
- Game attendance: 25,317
- Referee: Pat Haggerty
- Box Score

Game information

First quarter

- HOU – George Amundson 1-yard run (Skip Butler kick). Oilers 7–0. Drive:
- HOU – George Amundson 8-yard pass from Lynn Dickey (Skip Butler kick). Oilers 14–0. Drive:

Second quarter

- SD – Glen Bonner 3-yard run (Dennis Partee kick). Oilers 14–7. Drive:

Third quarter

- SD – Gary Garrison 29-yard pass from Dan Fouts (Dennis Partee kick). Tie 14–14. Drive:

Fourth quarter

- HOU – George Amundson 3-yard run (Skip Butler kick). Oilers 21–14. Drive:

Top passers

- SD – Dan Fouts – 13/20, 209 yards, TD, 2 INT
- HOU – Lynn Dickey – 19/26, 195 yards, TD, INT

Top rushers

- SD – Cid Edwards – 16 rushes, 100 yards
- HOU – Ronnie Coleman – 21 rushes, 123 yards

Top receivers

- SD – Gary Garrison – 4 receptions, 80 yards, TD
- HOU – George Amundson – 5 receptions, 51 yards
