= Glen Bonner =

American football player (1952–2017)

No. 21
- Position: Running back

Personal information
- Born: May 25, 1952; Bremerton, Washington, U.S.
- Died: October 16, 2017 (aged 65); Seattle, Washington, U.S.
- Listed height: 6 ft 2 in (1.88 m)
- Listed weight: 202 lb (92 kg)

Career information
- High school: Davis (WA)
- College: Washington
- NFL draft: 1974: undrafted

Career history
- San Diego Chargers (1974–1975); San Diego Chargers (1976)*; Oakland Raiders (1977)*
- * Offseason or practice squad member only

Career NFL statistics
- Rushing attempts: 94
- Rushing yards: 319
- Rushing TDs: 3
- Stats at Pro Football Reference

Glen Lee Bonner (May 5, 1952 – October 16, 2017) was an American professional football running back in the National Football League (NFL) who played for the San Diego Chargers. He played college football for the Washington Huskies. Bonner died in 2017.

== Career ==
Bonner played college football for Yakima Valley College and the University of Washington.

In 1974 he signed as an undrafted free agent with the San Diego Chargers and played in the preseason with them, earning a spot on the team. He won the starting job over Bo Matthews who was drafted second overall in 1974. After an injury in October 1974, halfback Don Woods got Bonner's job and then after him Mattews took the starters position. In December 1975 he got fined $50 together with Harrison Davis and Sam Williams after a shouting incident with Coy Bacon and defensive coordinator Jackie Simpson.

In the preseason game against the Chicago Bears in 1975, Bonner broke his nose. Bonner was waived by the Chargers in September 1975 but later got back on the team. In September 1976 he got waived together with Dwight McDonald, Guy Dennis, Kevin Grady, Bud Magrum, Larry Keller, Charles Anthony, Maurice Tyler, Sergio Albert, Ray Wersching and Bruce Gossett. He was in 1977 on the Oakland Raiders preseason squad but was not included after the last cut.
