= List of Idaho State Bengals in the NFL draft =

This is a list of Idaho State Bengals football players in the NFL draft.

== Key ==
| B | Back | K | Kicker | NT | Nose tackle |
| C | Center | LB | Linebacker | FB | Fullback |
| DB | Defensive back | P | Punter | HB | Halfback |
| DE | Defensive end | QB | Quarterback | WR | Wide receiver |
| DT | Defensive tackle | RB | Running back | G | Guard |
| E | End | T | Offensive tackle | TE | Tight end |

== Selections ==
| Year | Round | Pick | Overall | Player | Team | Position |
|---|---|---|---|---|---|---|
| 1956 | 23 | 6 | 271 | Al Stephenson | Baltimore Colts | T |
| 1957 | 22 | 7 | 260 | Paul Tripp | San Francisco 49ers | T |
| 1958 | 21 | 12 | 253 | Jim Wagstaff | Detroit Lions | B |
| 1959 | 16 | 6 | 186 | Bob Cook | San Francisco 49ers | B |
| 1961 | 17 | 9 | 233 | Tom Jewell | San Francisco 49ers | T |
| 1964 | 13 | 5 | 173 | John Miller | Detroit Lions | T |
| 1970 | 9 | 20 | 228 | Ed Bell | New York Jets | WR |
| 1971 | 10 | 9 | 243 | Carlis Harris | Denver Broncos | WR |
| 1972 | 10 | 20 | 254 | Phillip Price | Oakland Raiders | DB |
| 1973 | 6 | 22 | 152 | Tom Toner | Green Bay Packers | LB |
| 1973 | 8 | 11 | 193 | Mike Hancock | Washington Redskins | TE |
| 1974 | 13 | 2 | 314 | Brian Vertefeuille | San Diego Chargers | T |
| 1974 | 15 | 19 | 343 | Greg Mathis | Oakland Raiders | DB |
| 1975 | 11 | 12 | 272 | Rene Garnett | New England Patriots | DB |
| 1975 | 12 | 11 | 297 | Matt Kendon | New England Patriots | DT |
| 1975 | 13 | 1 | 313 | John Roman | Baltimore Colts | G |
| 1977 | 3 | 18 | 74 | Rick Scribner | Green Bay Packers | G |
| 1982 | 6 | 15 | 154 | Mike Machurek | Detroit Lions | QB |
| 1982 | 8 | 19 | 214 | Case deBruijn | Kansas City Chiefs | P |
| 1983 | 11 | 21 | 300 | Dan Taylor | Dallas Cowboys | T |
| 1983 | 12 | 14 | 321 | Jim Lane | Detroit Lions | C |
| 1985 | 9 | 24 | 248 | Bob Otto | Seattle Seahawks | DE |
| 1986 | 8 | 3 | 197 | Kevin Hudgens | Atlanta Falcons | DE |
| 1987 | 10 | 10 | 261 | Merril Hoge | Pittsburgh Steelers | RB |
| 2003 | 6 | 7 | 180 | Eddie Johnson | Minnesota Vikings | P |
| 2004 | 4 | 30 | 126 | Jared Allen | Kansas City Chiefs | DE |
