= David Jaynes =

American football player (born 1952)

No. 12
- Position: Quarterback

Personal information
- Born: December 12, 1952 (age 73); Kansas City, Kansas, U.S.
- Listed height: 6 ft 2 in (1.88 m)
- Listed weight: 212 lb (96 kg)

Career information
- High school: Bonner Springs (Bonner Springs, Kansas)
- College: Kansas
- NFL draft: 1974: 3rd round, 66th overall pick

Career history
- Kansas City Chiefs (1974)

Awards and highlights
- Consensus All-American (1973); First-team All-Big Eight (1973)

Career NFL statistics
- Completions: 0
- Attempts: 2
- TD–INT: 0–1
- Passer rating: 0
- Stats at Pro Football Reference

David Duane Jaynes (born December 12, 1952) is an American former professional football player who was a quarterback in the National Football League (NFL). He played college football for the Kansas Jayhawks football, earning All-American honors in 1973. That same year, he was a finalist for the Heisman Trophy finishing fourth in voting. He was selected in the third-round (66th overall selection) of the 1974 NFL draft by the Kansas City Chiefs. He would play only one season in the NFL.

== College career ==
Jaynes accepted a football scholarship from the University of Kansas. During the early 1970s, he broke virtually every passing record in Kansas history. When he left Kansas, he was first in passing, with 5,132 yards. This record held for ten years until broken in 1983 by Frank Seurer. He also left Kansas with the record for career passing touchdowns at 35, which held up until the 2007 season, when he was passed by Todd Reesing, who would shatter the record with 90.

Jaynes' most memorable game was in 1973 against SEC power Tennessee, when he completed 35 of 58 attempted passes for 394 yards in the 28-27 loss. In 1973 Kansas finished 7–4–1 and went to the Liberty Bowl. Jaynes finished fourth in the voting that year for the Heisman Trophy behind winner John Cappelletti, John Hicks, and Roosevelt Leaks. He also finished ahead of future two-time Heisman winner Archie Griffin. Jaynes is, to date, the only Heisman Trophy finalist in Kansas football history. He's one of 3 players to receive votes, along with John Hadl and Bobby Douglass

== Professional career ==
Jaynes was drafted in the third round (66th overall) of the 1974 NFL draft by the Kansas City Chiefs. He played two games that season, failing to complete either of his only two passing attempts, one of which was intercepted. He was also the first overall player selected in the World Football League during the inaugural 1974 WFL Draft by the Houston Texans, but never signed with them.

== Personal life ==
In 2001, Jaynes married Barbara Harris, who was married to actor Cary Grant until Grant's death.
