= Lem Burnham =

American football player (born 1947)

No. 83, 90, 67
- Position: Defensive end

Personal information
- Born: August 30, 1947 (age 79); Winter Haven, Florida, U.S.
- Listed height: 6 ft 4 in (1.93 m)
- Listed weight: 236 lb (107 kg)

Career information
- High school: Jewett (Winter Haven)
- College: U.S. International
- NFL draft: 1974: 15th round, 378th overall pick

Career history
- Kansas City Chiefs (1974)*; The Hawaiians (1974–1975); Washington Redskins (1976)*; Winnipeg Blue Bombers (1976); Philadelphia Eagles (1977–1980)
- * Offseason or practice squad member only

Career NFL statistics
- Sacks: 16.0
- Fumble recoveries: 1
- Stats at Pro Football Reference

Lemuel L. Burnham (born August 30, 1947) is an American former professional football player who was a defensive end for three seasons with the Philadelphia Eagles of the National Football League (NFL). He was selected by the Kansas City Chiefs in the 15th round of the 1974 NFL draft. He played college football at Santa Ana Junior College and United States International University. Burnham was also a member of The Hawaiians of the World Football League (WFL), the Washington Redskins of the NFL, and Winnipeg Blue Bombers of the Canadian Football League (CFL).

== Early life and college ==
Lemuel L. Burnham was born on August 30, 1947, in Winter Haven, Florida. He attended Jewett High School in Winter Haven.

Burnham first played college football at Santa Ana Junior College from 1970 to 1971. He then transferred to play at United States International University from 1972 to 1973.

== Professional career ==
Burnham was selected by the Kansas City Chiefs in the 15th round, with the 378th overall pick, of the 1974 NFL draft. He released by the Chiefs before the start of the 1974 season. He was selected by The Hawaiians with the 201st pick in the 1974 WFL Draft and played for the team from 1974 to 1975. Burnham spent the 1976 off-season with the Washington Redskins and was released by the team on August 24, 1976. He traveled to Canada to join the Winnipeg Blue Bombers a day after being released by the Redskins. He played in one game for the Blue Bombers during the 1976 season. He played in 45 games for the Philadelphia Eagles from 1977 to 1979. He led the Eagles in sacks with ten in 1977. He spent the 1980 season on injured reserve due to a knee injury suffered in training camp. Burnham announced his retirement from football on July 22, 1981.

== Military career ==
Burnham served four years in the United States Marine Corps from 1965 to 1969, including thirteen months with the 3rd Marine Division in Vietnam. He won a Good Conduct Medal, National Defense Service Medal, Combat Action Ribbon, Naval Unit Citation, Presidential Unit Citation, Vietnam Service Medal and Vietnam Campaign Medal during his time in the Marines. He was honorably discharged from the Marines.

== Personal life ==
Burnham worked as the team psychologist for the Philadelphia Eagles, Philadelphia 76ers and Baltimore Orioles from 1986 to 1992. He was the director and vice president of player and employee development of the NFL from 1992 to 2002. He was also the mastermind behind the NFL Rookie Symposium, which debuted in 1997. Burnham is a member of the NFL Alumni Association and the current vice president for the Philadelphia chapter. He is also a life member of the Maxwell Football Club.

He earned his Bachelor of Arts degree in psychology from U.S. International University in 1974. Burnham then acquired his Master of Science degree in counseling psychology from Bemidji State University in 1978. He earned his Ph.D. in psychology from Temple University in 1984. He is a diplomate of the American Psychotherapy Association and the American Board of Psychological Specialties. Burnham is also a member of the American Psychological Association, the Association for Psychological Science and the American College of Forensic Examiners. He is the psychology program coordinator at Wilmington University. He is also a member of Pi Gamma Mu.

Burnham was a founding director of the Corporate Alliance to End Partner Violence in 1995. He was appointed to the National Advisory Council on Violence Against Women in 1995.

Burnham provides sports psychology services to professional athletes through ProWorldAthletes, Inc. He is the author of "Personality in Group: Group Relevant Personality and Sociometric Status". He is also the author of "Beyond X's And O's", a handbook for coaches to identify and manage player related issues. Burnham is the co-author of two performance improvement publications called "The Athletic Success Profile" and "The Personal Success Profile." He is an experienced public speaker and a member of Toastmasters International.

=== Family ===
His son Bryan plays for the BC Lions of the Canadian Football League. Lem's son Lewis played college football for the North Carolina Tar Heels. His daughter Shannon attended St. Francis College in Loretto, Pennsylvania on a basketball scholarship. His daughter Kara played basketball and volleyball at Montclair State University.
