= Terry Wells (American football) =

American football player (born 1951)

No. 41, 37
- Position: Running back

Personal information
- Born: April 20, 1951 (age 75); Wade, Mississippi, U.S.
- Listed height: 5 ft 11 in (1.80 m)
- Listed weight: 195 lb (88 kg)

Career information
- High school: East Central (MS)
- College: Southern Miss
- NFL draft: 1974: undrafted

Career history
- Houston Oilers (1974); Green Bay Packers (1975)

Career NFL statistics
- Rushing attempts: 33
- Rushing yards: 139
- Receptions: 7
- Receiving yards: 20
- Kick returns: 1
- Return yards: 26
- Stats at Pro Football Reference

Terry Wells (born April 20, 1951) is a former running back in the National Football League (NFL). He first played with the Houston Oilers during the 1974 NFL season before playing the following season with the Green Bay Packers.
