= Tom Forrest =

American football player (born 1952)

No. 62
- Position: Guard

Personal information
- Born: April 11, 1952 (age 74); Washington, D.C., U.S.
- Listed height: 6 ft 2 in (1.88 m)
- Listed weight: 255 lb (116 kg)

Career information
- High school: DeMatha Catholic (Hyattsville, Maryland)
- College: Cincinnati
- NFL draft: 1974: 8th round, 185th overall pick

Career history
- San Diego Chargers (1974)*; Chicago Bears (1974); Chicago Winds (1975)
- * Offseason or practice squad member only

Career NFL statistics
- Games played: 8
- Games started: 0
- Stats at Pro Football Reference

Thomas Wesley Forrest (born April 11, 1952) is an American former professional football player who was an offensive guard for one season with the Chicago Bears of the National Football League (NFL). He played college football for the Cincinnati Bearcats and was selected by the San Diego Chargers in the eighth round of the 1974 NFL draft.

== Professional career ==
=== New York Stars ===
Forrest was selected in the tenth round of the 1974 World Football League Draft in January by the New York Stars, but didn't play for the team.

=== San Diego Chargers ===
Forrest was selected by the San Diego Chargers in the eighth round of the 1974 NFL draft in April. He never saw action as a member of the team.

=== Chicago Bears ===
Forrest played in eight games with the Chicago Bears during the 1974 season.

=== Chicago Winds ===
Forrest played one game with the WFL's Chicago Winds in the 1975 season.
