= Cid Edwards =

American football player (1943–2013)

No. 39, 37
- Position: Running back

Personal information
- Born: October 10, 1943; Selma, Alabama, U.S.
- Died: April 6, 2013 (aged 69); San Diego, California, U.S.
- Listed height: 6 ft 3 in (1.91 m)
- Listed weight: 230 lb (104 kg)

Career information
- High school: Robert A. Taft (Cincinnati, Ohio)
- College: Tennessee State
- NFL draft: 1967: undrafted

Career history
- St. Louis Cardinals (1967–1971); San Diego Chargers (1972–1974); Chicago Bears (1975)

Career NFL statistics
- Rushing yards: 3,006
- Rushing average: 4.3
- Receptions: 144
- Receiving yards: 1,492
- Total touchdowns: 19
- Stats at Pro Football Reference

Cleophus J. "Cid" Edwards Jr. (October 10, 1943 – April 6, 2013) was an American professional football player who was a running back in the National Football League (NFL) from 1968 to 1975. He played college football for the Tennessee State Tigers.

Edwards had a notable season with the San Diego Chargers in 1972. During that year, the Chargers' offense fequently used screen passes to Edwards, who gained significant yardage. He remains a recognized figure among long time fans of the team.

== NFL career statistics ==
Legend
**Bold**	Career high

Year	Team	Games		Rushing					Receiving				
Year	Team	GP	GS	Att	Yds	Avg	Lng	TD	Rec	Yds	Avg	Lng	TD
1968	STL	14	0	31	214	**6.9**	42	1	1	2	2.0	2	0
1969	STL	14	9	107	504	4.7	48	3	23	309	13.4	37	0
1970	STL	11	8	70	350	5.0	22	1	19	150	7.9	39	1
1971	STL	12	6	108	316	2.9	14	4	12	122	10.2	38	0
1972	SDG	12	12	**157**	**679**	4.3	31	**5**	**40**	**557**	**13.9**	**61**	**2**
1973	SDG	13	12	133	609	4.6	**50**	1	25	164	6.6	28	0
1974	SDG	10	6	65	261	4.0	30	0	13	102	7.8	16	0
1975	CHI	8	4	27	73	2.7	16	0	11	86	7.8	14	1
Career		94	57	698	3,006	4.3	50	15	144	1,492	10.4	61	4
