= Marvin Davis (Canadian football) =

American gridiron football player (born 1952)

Profile
- Positions: Defensive lineman, Linebacker

Personal information
- Born: May 25, 1952 (age 74); Shreveport, Louisiana, U.S.
- Listed height: 6 ft 4 in (1.93 m)
- Listed weight: 235 lb (107 kg)

Career information
- High school: Eden Gardens (LA)
- College: Southern

Career history
- 1974: Houston Oilers
- 1975: Shreveport Steamer
- 1976–77: Montreal Alouettes
- 1978: Hamilton Tiger-Cats
- 1978: Winnipeg Blue Bombers

Awards and highlights
- Grey Cup champion (1977)
- Stats at Pro Football Reference

Marvin Eugene Davis (born May 25, 1952) is a former gridiron football linebacker, defensive lineman and Grey Cup champion.

Davis played his college football at Southern University and began his career in 1974 with the National Football League (NFL)'s Houston Oilers, where he played 13 games as a back-up. He then joined the World Football League (WFL)'s Shreveport Steamer for 1975. In 1976, he moved to Canada with the Montreal Alouettes and was part of their 1977 Grey Cup winning team. He finished his career in 1978 with the Hamilton Tiger-Cats and Winnipeg Blue Bombers.
