= John Strada =

American football player (born 1952)

No. 87
- Position: Tight end

Personal information
- Born: November 13, 1952 (age 73); Kansas City, Missouri, U.S.
- Listed height: 6 ft 3 in (1.91 m)
- Listed weight: 230 lb (104 kg)

Career information
- High school: De La Salle (Kansas City)
- College: William Jewell
- NFL draft: 1974: undrafted

Career history
- New York Giants (1974); Kansas City Chiefs (1974)
- Stats at Pro Football Reference

John Strada (born November 13, 1952) is an American former professional football player who was a tight end in the National Football League (NFL). He played college football for the William Jewell Cardinals. He played in the NFL for the New York Giants and Kansas City Chiefs in 1974.
