= Brian Vertefeuille =

American football player (born 1951)

No. 68
- Position: Offensive tackle

Personal information
- Born: April 4, 1951 (age 75); Willimantic, Connecticut, U.S.
- Listed height: 6 ft 3 in (1.91 m)
- Listed weight: 252 lb (114 kg)

Career information
- High school: Windham (Willimantic)
- College: Idaho State
- NFL draft: 1974: 13th round, 314th overall pick

Career history
- San Diego Chargers (1974); Shreveport Steamer (1975); Saskatchewan Roughriders (1976); Toronto Argonauts (1976); San Francisco 49ers (1977)*
- * Offseason or practice squad member only
- Stats at Pro Football Reference

Brian Lionel Vertefeuille (born April 4, 1951) is an American former professional football player who was an offensive tackle for the San Diego Chargers of the National Football League (NFL). He played college football for the Idaho State Bengals. He was selected in the 13th round of the 1974 NFL Draft by the San Diego Chargers.
