= Harrison Davis =

American football player (born 1952)

No. 87
- Position: Wide receiver

Personal information
- Born: February 20, 1952 (age 74); Salisbury, North Carolina, U.S.
- Listed height: 6 ft 4 in (1.93 m)
- Listed weight: 219 lb (99 kg)

Career information
- High school: Bethel (Hampton, Virginia)
- College: Virginia
- NFL draft: 1974: 4th round, 81st overall pick

Career history
- San Diego Chargers (1974)

Awards and highlights
- First-team All-ACC (1973)

Career NFL statistics
- Receptions: 18
- Receiving yards: 432
- Receiving TDs: 2
- Stats at Pro Football Reference

Harrison Paul Davis III (born February 20, 1952) is an American former professional football player who was a wide receiver for the San Diego Chargers of the National Football League (NFL). He played college football as a quarterback for the Virginia Cavaliers.
