= Charlie Getty =

American football player (born 1952)

No. 77
- Position: Offensive lineman

Personal information
- Born: July 24, 1952 (age 74); Pompton Lakes, New Jersey, U.S.
- Listed height: 6 ft 4 in (1.93 m)
- Listed weight: 265 lb (120 kg)

Career information
- High school: Pompton Lakes (NJ)
- College: Penn State
- NFL draft: 1974: 2nd round, 41st overall pick

Career history
- Kansas City Chiefs (1974–1982); Green Bay Packers (1983)

Awards and highlights
- PFWA All-Rookie Team (1974); Second-team All-American (1973); First-team All-East (1973)

Career NFL statistics
- Games played: 134
- Games started: 77
- Fumble recoveries: 4
- Stats at Pro Football Reference

Charles Matthew Getty (born July 24, 1952) is an American former professional football player who was an offensive lineman for ten seasons in the National Football League (NFL), mainly for the Kansas City Chiefs.

Getty competed in football, track and wrestling at Pompton Lakes High School in his hometown. He played college football and wrestled for Penn State University. He finished fifth in the 1973 NCAA wrestling tournament and third in 1974.

Getty later became an adjunct academic instructor and strength and conditioning coach for Evangel University.
