= Dave Grannell =

American football player (born 1952)

No. 51
- Position: Tight end

Personal information
- Born: October 4, 1952 (age 74); Denver, Colorado, U.S.
- Listed height: 6 ft 4 in (1.93 m)
- Listed weight: 230 lb (104 kg)

Career information
- High school: Thomas Jefferson (Denver)
- College: Arizona State
- NFL draft: 1974: 11th round, 262nd overall pick

Career history
- San Diego Chargers (1974)
- Stats at Pro Football Reference

David Matthew Grannell (born October 4, 1952) is an American former professional football player who was a tight end for the San Diego Chargers of the National Football League (NFL). He also played college football for the Arizona State Sun Devils.
