= Charles Anthony (American football) =

American football player (born 1952)

No. 59
- Position: Linebacker

Personal information
- Born: July 10, 1952 (age 74); Houston, Texas, U.S.
- Listed height: 6 ft 1 in (1.85 m)
- Listed weight: 230 lb (104 kg)

Career information
- High school: Edison (Fresno, California)
- College: USC
- NFL draft: 1974: 15th round, 366th overall pick

Career history
- San Diego Chargers (1974); BC Lions (1977); Ottawa Rough Riders (1978); Saskatchewan Roughriders (1978)

Awards and highlights
- Second-team All-Pac-8 (1972)

Career NFL statistics
- Interceptions: 1
- Fumble recoveries: 2
- Stats at Pro Football Reference

Charles Raymond Anthony (born July 10, 1952) is an American former professional football player who was a linebacker for the San Diego Chargers of the National Football League (NFL). He played college football for the USC Trojans and also spent two years in the Canadian Football League (CFL) with the BC Lions, Ottawa Rough Riders and Saskatchewan Roughriders. He was inducted into the Fresno, California Athletic Hall of Fame in 1992.
