= Ronnie Coleman (American football) =

American football player (born 1951)

No. 47
- Position: Running back

Personal information
- Born: July 9, 1951 (age 75); Jasper, Alabama, U.S.
- Listed height: 5 ft 10 in (1.78 m)
- Listed weight: 195 lb (88 kg)

Career information
- High school: Walker (Jasper)
- College: Alabama A&M
- NFL draft: 1974: undrafted

Career history
- Houston Oilers (1974–1981)

Career NFL statistics
- Rushing attempts: 700
- Rushing yards: 2,769
- Rushing TDs: 16
- Stats at Pro Football Reference

Ronnie L. Coleman (born July 9, 1951) is an American former professional football player who was a running back for the Houston Oilers of the National Football League (NFL) from 1974 to 1981. He played college football for the Alabama A&M Bulldogs.

His son, KaRon Coleman, also played in the NFL.

== NFL career statistics ==
Legend
**Bold**	Career high

=== Regular season ===
Year	Team	Games		Rushing					Receiving				
Year	Team	GP	GS	Att	Yds	Avg	Lng	TD	Rec	Yds	Avg	Lng	TD
1974	HOU	13	4	52	193	3.7	37	1	4	9	2.3	7	0
1975	HOU	14	12	175	**790**	4.5	**46**	**5**	18	129	7.2	24	0
1976	HOU	13	**13**	171	684	4.0	39	2	**40**	**247**	6.2	19	**3**
1977	HOU	14	**13**	**185**	660	3.6	22	**5**	22	115	5.2	21	1
1978	HOU	15	2	61	188	3.1	16	1	19	246	**12.9**	**33**	1
1979	HOU	14	0	21	81	3.9	10	0	12	114	9.5	17	1
1980	HOU	14	0	14	82	**5.9**	27	1	16	168	10.5	27	0
1981	HOU	**16**	0	21	91	4.3	30	1	19	211	11.1	24	0
		113	44	700	2,769	4.0	46	16	150	1,239	8.3	33	6

=== Playoffs ===
Year	Team	Games		Rushing					Receiving				
Year	Team	GP	GS	Att	Yds	Avg	Lng	TD	Rec	Yds	Avg	Lng	TD
1978	HOU	2	0	**9**	**16**	1.8	**12**	0	2	20	10.0	15	0
1979	HOU	**3**	0	2	5	**2.5**	4	0	**4**	**100**	**25.0**	**41**	0
1980	HOU	1	0	0	0	0.0	0	0	1	23	23.0	23	0
		7	0	11	21	1.9	12	0	7	143	20.4	41	0
