= Bon Boatwright =

American football player (born 1951)

No. 73
- Position: Defensive tackle

Personal information
- Born: October 28, 1951 (age 75); Henderson, Texas, U.S.
- Listed height: 6 ft 5 in (1.96 m)
- Listed weight: 262 lb (119 kg)

Career information
- High school: West Rusk (TX)
- College: Oklahoma State
- NFL draft: 1974: 8th round, 206th overall pick

Career history
- San Diego Chargers (1974); Shreveport Steamer (1975)
- Stats at Pro Football Reference

Bon Boatwright (born October 28, 1951) is an American former professional football player who was a defensive tackle for the San Diego Chargers of the National Football League (NFL) in 1974. He played college football for the Oklahoma State Cowboys.
