= Mark Markovich =

American football player (born 1952)

No. 65, 56, 68
- Positions: Guard, Center

Personal information
- Born: November 7, 1952 (age 73); Latrobe, Pennsylvania, U.S.
- Listed height: 6 ft 5 in (1.96 m)
- Listed weight: 255 lb (116 kg)

Career information
- High school: Greensburg (PA) Central Catholic
- College: Penn State
- NFL draft: 1974: 2nd round, 43rd overall pick

Career history
- San Diego Chargers (1974–1975); Detroit Lions (1976–1977)

Awards and highlights
- Second-team All-American (1973); First-team All-East (1973)
- Stats at Pro Football Reference

Mark James Markovich (born November 7, 1952) is an American former professional football player who was an offensive lineman for four seasons in the National Football League (NFL), where he played for the San Diego Chargers and Detroit Lions. Prior to his professional career, Markovich played college football for the Penn State Nittany Lions, blocking for Heisman Trophy–winner John Cappelletti. Later in life, he owned a machine shop in pekin, il. A small LLC named Illinois machine and tool.
