= John Teerlinck =

American football player and coach (1951–2020)

No. 77
- Position: Defensive end

Personal information
- Born: April 9, 1951; Rochester, New York, U.S.
- Died: May 10, 2020 (aged 69)
- Listed height: 6 ft 5 in (1.96 m)
- Listed weight: 248 lb (112 kg)

Career information
- High school: Fenwick (IL)
- College: Western Illinois
- NFL draft: 1974: 5th round, 105th overall pick

Career history

Playing
- San Diego Chargers (1974–1975)

Coaching
- Iowa Lakes (1977) Defensive coach; Eastern Illinois (1978–1979) Defensive coordinator; Illinois (1980–1982) Assistant; Cleveland Browns (1989–1990) Defensive line coach; Los Angeles Rams (1991) Defensive line coach; Minnesota Vikings (1992–1994) Defensive line coach; Detroit Lions (1995–1996) Defensive line coach; Denver Broncos (1997–2001) Defensive line coach; Indianapolis Colts (2002–2011) Defensive line coach

Awards and highlights
- 3× Super Bowl champion (XXXII, XXXIII, XLI)
- Stats at Pro Football Reference

John Teerlinck (April 9, 1951 – May 10, 2020) was an American professional football player and coach. He won three Super Bowls as a defensive line coach in the National Football League (NFL) with the Denver Broncos (1997, 1998) and Indianapolis Colts (2006). The annual award for NFL's best defensive line coach is named after Teerlinck. Twenty-three of the players he coached were selected to the Pro Bowl and three were inducted into the Pro Football Hall of Fame. This success has led Teerlinck to be regarded as one of the NFL's greatest defensive line coaches.

== Early life ==
Teerlink was born in Rochester, New York. He attended Fenwick High School, where he earned All-Chicago Catholic League honors.

== Playing career ==
Teerlink played college football for the Western Illinois Leathernecks. He studied Fred Dryer and employed those moves in his play. "We used to get New York Giants games at Western and I'd watch No. 89, Fred Dryer, and copy his moves", Teerlinck said. A co-captain as a senior at Western Illinois University, he recorded 122 tackles and 14 sacks. He was named the team's defensive most valuable player and was voted a third-team Little All-American by the Associated Press.

Teerlink was selected in the fifth round by the San Diego Chargers as the 105th overall pick in the 1974 NFL draft. He played 20 games with them from 1974 to 1975 before being forced to retire with a knee injury.

== Coaching career ==
Teerlinck coached 32 NFL playoff games, including six conference championship games and four Super Bowls. Teerlinck earned three Super Bowl rings with two teams (Denver Broncos 1997, 1998 and Indianapolis Colts 2006). His coaching career ended after the 2011 season, when he was fired by the Colts after their 2–14 season.

Regarded by some as the greatest defensive line coach of all time, Teerlinck established an NFL presence in the early 1990s. "John Teerlinck is kind of like Mr. Miyagi", John Randle said. "He's very unorthodox. A different breed. Rough around the edges. He tells you things that are funny, but they register if you just listen. That's why he's the guru." He is the namesake of the John Teerlinck Award, given annually to the best defensive line coach in the NFL.

As a pass-rush specialist, Teerlinck coached 23 Pro Bowl players, including two conference defensive players of the year in Michael Dean Perry with the Cleveland Browns in 1989 and Chris Doleman with the Minnesota Vikings in 1992. Three of his former players—Kevin Greene with the Los Angeles Rams along with Randle and Doleman from the Vikings—have been enshrined in the Pro Football Hall of Fame. Randle selected Teerlinck to be his Hall of Fame presenter at his induction ceremony in 2010. Previously, only 10 assistant coaches had presented out of 260 inductees. (Note: Also in 2010, Russ Grimm selected his former offensive line coach Joe Bugel to be his presenter.)

In his tenure, Teerlinck coached seven players (Doleman, Greene, Randle, Bubba Baker, Neil Smith, Freeney and Robert Mathis) to 100 career sacks.

Teerlinck developed a reputation for teaching his players to hit quarterbacks low at the knees. With the Detroit Lions in 1996, the allegations were substantial enough that then-NFL commissioner Paul Tagliabue summoned him to a meeting for a warning.

== Personal life ==
Teerlinck and his wife, Sue, had five children: Annie, Bill, Mark, Molly and Mary. Bill followed in his father's footsteps and went into coaching. He was an assistant under his father with the Colts from 2007 to 2011, and later became a defensive line coach in the NFL and college football.

Teerlinck died on May 10, 2020, at the age of 69.
