= Jesse Freitas Jr. =

American football player (1951–2015)

No. 17
- Position: Quarterback

Personal information
- Born: September 10, 1951; San Mateo, California, U.S.
- Died: February 8, 2015 (aged 63); Petaluma, California, U.S.
- Listed height: 6 ft 1 in (1.85 m)
- Listed weight: 203 lb (92 kg)

Career information
- High school: Junípero Serra (San Mateo)
- College: Stanford (1969-1970); San Diego State (1971-1972)
- NFL draft: 1974: 6th round, 133rd overall pick

Career history
- San Diego Chargers (1974–1975)

Awards and highlights
- Sammy Baugh Trophy (1973); Third-team All-American (1973); NCAA passing yards leader (1973); First-team All-PCAA (1973)

Career NFL statistics
- Passing attempts: 219
- Passing completions: 98
- Completion percentage: 44.7%
- TD–INT: 8–13
- Passing yards: 1,244
- Passer rating: 50.5
- Stats at Pro Football Reference

Jesse Lee Freitas Jr. (September 10, 1951 – February 8, 2015) was an American professional football player who was a quarterback in the National Football League (NFL). He was drafted by the San Diego Chargers 133rd overall in the sixth round of the 1974 NFL draft. He played college football for the Stanford Cardinal and San Diego State Aztecs.

His father Jesse Sr. was a professional football player in the 1940s.

On February 8, 2015, Freitas was found dead in his car in Petaluma, California. Police officials said the Sonoma County coroner had not yet determined a cause of death.

== College career ==
=== College statistics ===
| Year | Team | Games | | | Passing | | | | | | | | Rushing | | | |
| Year | Team | GP | GS | Record | Cmp | Att | Pct | Yds | Avg | TD | Int | Rtg | Att | Yds | Avg | TD |
|---|---|---|---|---|---|---|---|---|---|---|---|---|---|---|---|---|
| 1970 | Stanford | 1 | 0 | 0–0 | 14 | 29 | 48.3 | 215 | 7.4 | 0 | 2 | 96.8 | 8 | 16 | 2.0 | 0 |
| 1971 | San Diego State | Redshirt (redshirt) | | | | | | | | | | | | | | |
| 1972 | San Diego State | 11 | 11 | 10–1 | 97 | 171 | 56.7 | 1,200 | 7.0 | 7 | 14 | 112.8 | 48 | -31 | -0.6 | 2 |
| 1973 | San Diego State | 11 | 11 | 9–1–1 | 227 | 347 | 65.4 | 2,993 | 8.6 | 21 | 17 | 148.0 | 63 | -92 | -1.5 | 2 |
| Career | | 23 | 22 | 19–2–1 | 338 | 547 | 61.8 | 4,408 | 8.1 | 28 | 33 | 134.3 | 119 | -107 | -0.9 | 4 |

== See also ==
- List of NCAA major college football yearly passing leaders
- List of NCAA major college football yearly total offense leaders
