= Bo Matthews =

American football player (born 1951)

No. 41, 33
- Position: Running back

Personal information
- Born: November 15, 1951 (age 74); Huntsville, Alabama, U.S.
- Listed height: 6 ft 4 in (1.93 m)
- Listed weight: 230 lb (104 kg)

Career information
- High school: S.R. Butler (Huntsville)
- College: Colorado
- NFL draft: 1974: 1st round, 2nd overall pick

Career history
- San Diego Chargers (1974–1979); New York Giants (1980–1981); Miami Dolphins (1981)

Career NFL statistics
- Rushing attempts: 424
- Rushing yards: 1,566
- Rushing touchdowns: 11
- Stats at Pro Football Reference

William Pierce "Bo" Matthews (born November 15, 1951) is an American former professional football player who was a running back in the National Football League (NFL). He played college football for the Colorado Buffaloes and was selected by the San Diego Chargers in the first round of the 1974 NFL draft with the second overall pick. He played high school football at S. R. Butler High School in Huntsville, Alabama.

== NFL career statistics ==
Legend
**Bold**	Career high

Year	Team	Games		Rushing					Receiving				
Year	Team	GP	GS	Att	Yds	Avg	Lng	TD	Rec	Yds	Avg	Lng	TD
1974	SDG	14	8	**95**	**328**	3.5	16	**4**	12	**90**	7.5	**23**	0
1975	SDG	13	**12**	71	254	3.6	24	3	9	59	6.6	22	0
1976	SDG	12	2	46	199	4.3	**42**	3	12	81	6.8	15	0
1977	SDG	12	0	43	193	**4.5**	22	0	3	41	**13.7**	**23**	0
1978	SDG	11	9	71	286	4.0	28	0	11	78	7.1	13	0
1979	SDG	**16**	0	30	112	3.7	22	1	7	40	5.7	13	0
1980	NYG	15	7	64	180	2.8	18	0	**19**	86	4.5	12	0
1981	NYG	5	1	4	14	3.5	6	0	2	13	6.5	11	0
1981	MIA	3	0	0	0	0.0	0	0	0	0	0.0	0	0
Career		101	39	424	1,566	3.7	42	11	75	488	6.5	23	0
