= Sam Williams (defensive back) =

American football player (born 1952)

No. 47, 49
- Position: Defensive back

Personal information
- Born: July 22, 1952 (age 74); Cameron, Texas, U.S.
- Listed height: 6 ft 2 in (1.88 m)
- Listed weight: 192 lb (87 kg)

Career information
- High school: Rockdale (Rockdale, Texas)
- College: New Mexico Highlands (1970–1972); California (1973)
- NFL draft: 1974: 12th round, 289th overall pick

Career history
- San Diego Chargers (1974–1975); Atlanta Falcons (1976)*; Houston Oilers (1976)
- * Offseason or practice squad member only

Career NFL statistics
- Interceptions: 2
- Fumble recoveries: 1
- Sacks: 1
- Stats at Pro Football Reference

Samuel Charles Williams (born July 22, 1952), also known as Samaji Adi Akili, is an American former professional football player who was a defensive back for three seasons in the National Football League (NFL) with the San Diego Chargers and Houston Oilers. He was selected by the Chargers in the twelfth round of the 1974 NFL draft. Williams played college football for the New Mexico Highlands Cowboys and the California Golden Bears.

== Early life and college ==
Samuel Charles Williams was born on July 22, 1952, in Cameron, Texas. He attended Rockdale High School in Rockdale, Texas. He was inducted into the Rockdale Sports Hall of Honor in 2009.

Williams played college football for the New Mexico Highlands Cowboys of New Mexico Highlands University from 1970 to 1972. He was then a letterman for the California Golden Bears of the University of California, Berkeley in 1973.

== Professional career ==
Williams was selected by the San Diego Chargers in the 12th round, with the 289th overall pick, of the 1974 NFL draft. He played in 13 games, starting 12, for the Chargers during his rookie year in 1974, recording one interception, one sack, and one fumble recovery. He appeared in 11 games, starting eight, during the 1975 season.

On April 7, 1976, Williams was traded to the Atlanta Falcons for Tom Hayes. Williams was released on September 7, 1976.

Williams signed with the Houston Oilers on November 4, 1976. He played in four games for the Oilers during the 1976 season.

== Personal life ==
Williams changed his name to Samaji Adi Akili after his football career.
