= Don Woods (American football) =

American football player (born 1951)

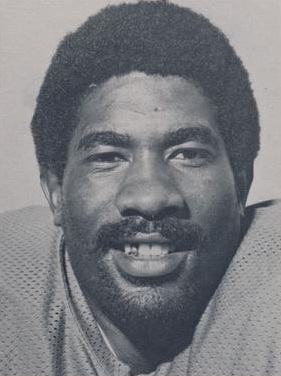
- Woods in 1976

No. 33, 47
- Position: Running back

Personal information
- Born: February 17, 1951 (age 75); Denton, Texas, U.S.
- Listed height: 6 ft 1 in (1.85 m)
- Listed weight: 210 lb (95 kg)

Career information
- College: New Mexico
- NFL draft: 1974: 6th round, 134th overall pick

Career history
- San Diego Chargers (1974–1980); San Francisco 49ers (1980)

Awards and highlights
- NFL Offensive Rookie of the Year (1974); PFWA NFL All-Rookie Team (1974)

Career NFL statistics
- Rushing attempts: 763
- Rushing yards: 3,087
- Rushing touchdowns: 16
- Stats at Pro Football Reference

Donald Ray Woods (born February 17, 1951) is an American former professional football player who was a running back for the San Diego Chargers and San Francisco 49ers of the National Football League (NFL) from 1974 to 1980.

== College career ==
Woods attended New Mexico Highlands University for college before transferring to the University of New Mexico his senior year when New Mexico Highlands dropped their football program. He was a mobile quarterback for the Lobos, leading the team with both 869 yards on 52 of 124 passes, and 971 yards on 220 rushes for 11 touchdowns, and winning the team's MVP award. In a game against rival New Mexico State, he rushed for 188 yards, at the time the fourth most in school history, for which he won the UPI Back of the Week award on Sept. 15, 1973. He also both rushed and passed for 100+ yards in the same game twice, against Utah (100 and 134) and Colorado State (148 and 128).

== Professional career ==
Woods was selected in the sixth round of the 1974 NFL draft by the Green Bay Packers. Green Bay released Woods at the end of training camp and he was subsequently picked up by the Chargers early in the 1974 season. He was used almost exclusively as a running back, despite playing quarterback in college (albeit one who ran almost twice as often as he passed). The move proved very fruitful for San Diego, as Woods, despite not suiting up until the third week of the season, went on to set a then-NFL-rookie-rushing-record of 1,162 yards in only 12 games, including a then-rookie-record seven 100-yard rushing performances (weeks 3, 4, 5, 7, 10, 12, and 14). Woods was selected the 1974 NFL Rookie of the Year. His seven rushing touchdowns and 96.8 rushing yards per game remain Chargers franchise rookie records, and his 1,162 rushing and 1,511 yards from scrimmage are second only to the numbers LaDainian Tomlinson put up in 2001.

A knee injury slowed Woods down during the 1975 campaign and while having several solid years with the Chargers, was never able to recapture the electricity of his rookie campaign. Woods was eventually phased out of the Chargers offense and traded to San Francisco during the 1980 season, finishing out his career that season with the 49ers. Woods finished his career with 3,087 career rushing yards and scored a total of 21 touchdowns. As of November 2021, Woods remains number 8 on the all-time Chargers rushing list.

=== NFL career statistics ===
Legend
**Bold**	Career high

Source			Rushing			Receiving				Passing						Kick returns			
Year	Tm	G	Rush	Yds	TD	Rec	Yds	TD	Fmb	Cmp	Att	Yds	TD	Int	Sk	Rt	Yds	TD	APYd
1974	SD	12	**227**	**1,162**	**7**	26	**349**	**3**	4	**1**	**3**	**28**	**1**	**1**	0	**3**	**61**	0	**1,572**
1975	SD	5	87	317	2	13	101	0	1	0	0	0	0	0	0	0	0	0	418
1976	SD	11	126	450	3	**34**	224	1	1	**1**	2	11	**1**	0	0	0	0	0	674
1977	SD	14	118	405	1	18	218	1	2	0	1	0	0	0	0	1	27	0	650
1978	SD	16	151	514	3	**34**	295	0	**5**	0	0	0	0	0	0	2	37	0	846
1979	SD	15	0	0	0	0	0	0	0	0	0	0	0	0	0	1	10	0	10
1980	SD	2	4	10	0	0	0	0	0	**1**	2	6	0	0	**1**	0	0	0	10
1980	SF	10	50	229	0	20	171	0	2	0	0	0	0	0	0	0	0	0	400
Career		85	763	3087	16	145	1358	5	15	3	8	45	2	1	1	7	135	0	4580
