= 1974 Washington Redskins season =

NFL team season

- Owner: Edward Bennett Williams
- General manager: George Allen
- President: Edward Bennett Williams
- Head coach: George Allen
- Offensive coordinator: Ted Marchibroda
- Defensive coordinator: LaVern Torgeson
- Home stadium: RFK Stadium

Results
- Record: 10–4
- Division place: 2nd NFC East
- Playoffs: Lost Divisional Playoffs (at Rams) 10–19
- Pro Bowlers: SS Ken Houston; LB Chris Hanburger; WR Charley Taylor; DT Diron Talbert

The 1974 Washington Redskins season was the franchise's 43rd season in the National Football League (NFL) and their 38th in Washington, D.C. The team matched on their 10–4 record from 1973. It is also notable for being Deacon Jones' first and only season with the Redskins; as well as being his final year in the NFL. In the divisional playoff round the Los Angeles Rams defeated the Washington Redskins 19–10.

== Offseason ==
=== NFL draft ===
Round	Pick	Player	Position	School/Club team

== Roster ==
1974 Washington Redskins roster
Quarterbacks (QB): 9 Sonny Jurgensen; 17 Billy Kilmer; 7 Joe Theismann; Running backs (RB): 43 Larry Brown; 40 Doug Cunningham; 44 Moses Denson; 31 Charlie Evans; 25 Mike Hull; 47 Duane Thomas; Wide receivers (WR): 46 Frank Grant; 80 Roy Jefferson; 24 Bill Malinchak; 42 Charley Taylor; Tight ends (TE): 88 Alvin Reed; 87 Jerry Smith	Offensive linemen (OL): 56 Len Hauss C; 73 Paul Laaveg G; 51 Dan Ryczek C; 62 Ray Schoenke T; 74 George Starke T; 63 Fred Sturt G/T; 78 Walt Sweeney G; 71 Jim Tyrer T; Defensive linemen (DL): 86 Verlon Biggs DE; 77 Bill Brundige DT; 66 Martin Imhof DE; 61 Dennis Johnson DT; 75 Deacon Jones DE; 79 Ron McDole DE; 72 Diron Talbert DT	Linebackers (LB): 50 Maxie Baughan OLB; 59 Brad Dusek OLB; 55 Chris Hanburger OLB; 57 Stu O'Dell OLB; 52 John Pergine OLB; 89 Dave Robinson OLB; 67 Rusty Tillman MLB; 58 Mike Varty OLB; Defensive backs (DB): 41 Mike Bass CB; 37 Pat Fischer CB; 27 Ken Houston SS; 21 Larry Jones CB; 23 Brig Owens FS; 30 Bryant Salter SS; 20 Ken Stone FS; Special teams (ST): 4 Mike Bragg P; 3 Mark Moseley K	Reserve: 26 Bob Brunet RB (IR); 84 Mike Hancock TE (IR); 75 Terry Hermeling T (IR); 53 Harold McLinton LB (IR); 28 Herb Mul-Key RB (IR); 34 Darwin Robinson RB (IR); 64 Manny Sistrunk DT (IR); 38 Larry Smith RB (IR); 29 Ted Vactor CB (IR); Rookies in italics

== Preseason ==
=== Schedule ===
Week	Date	Opponent	Result	Record	Venue	Attendance	Recap
1	August 2	New England Patriots	L 16–21	0–1	RFK Stadium	16,405	
2	August 9	Houston OIlers	L 3–48	0–2	RFK Stadium	14,768	
3	August 18	Buffalo Bills	L 15–16	0–3	RFK Stadium	28,409	
4	August 24	at Cleveland Browns	W 20–17	1–3	Cleveland Municipal Stadium	44,528	
5	August 30	Pittsburgh Steelers	L 19–21	1–4	RFK Stadium	42,327	
6	September 6	Baltimore Colts	W 7–6	2–4	RFK Stadium	29,704	

== Pre season Game summaries ==
=== Week P1 (Friday, August 2, 1974): vs. New England Patriots ===
Preseason week 1: New England Patriots 21 at Washington Redskins 16 – Game summary

Quarter	1	2	3	4	Total
Patriots	10	9	0	2	21
Redskins	0	6	7	3	16

at RFK Stadium • Washington, D.C.

- Date: August 2, 1974
- Game time: 8:05 p.m. EDT
- Game attendance: 16,405
- Referee: Bernie Ulman
- TV: WMAL-TV

Team	Category	Player	Statistics
NE	Passing		
NE	Rushing		
NE	Receiving		
WAS	Passing		
WAS	Rushing		
WAS	Receiving		

Scoring summary

Quarter	Time	Drive			Team	Scoring information	Score	
Quarter	Time	Plays	Yards	TOP	Team	Scoring information	NE	WAS
"TOP" = time of possession. For other American football terms, see Glossary of American football.							21	16

- Time of game: 2 hours, 41 minutes

Patriots	Game statistics	Redskins
	First downs	
	Rushes–yards	
	Passing yards	
	Passes	
	Sacked–yards	
	Net passing yards	
	Total yards	
	Return yards	
	Punts	
	Fumbles–lost	
	Penalties–yards	

=== Week P2 (Friday, August 9, 1974): vs. Houston Oilers ===
Preseason week 2: Houston Oilers 48 at Washington Redskins 3 – Game summary

Quarter	1	2	3	4	Total
Oilers	7	17	10	14	48
Redskins	3	0	0	0	3

at RFK Stadium • Washington, D.C.

- Date: August 9, 1974
- Game time: 8:00 p.m. EDT
- Game attendance: 14,768
- TV: WMAL-TV

Team	Category	Player	Statistics
HOU	Passing		
HOU	Rushing		
HOU	Receiving		
WAS	Passing		
WAS	Rushing		
WAS	Receiving		

Scoring summary

Quarter	Time	Drive			Team	Scoring information	Score	
Quarter	Time	Plays	Yards	TOP	Team	Scoring information	HOU	WAS
"TOP" = time of possession. For other American football terms, see Glossary of American football.							48	3

- Time of game:

Oilers	Game statistics	Redskins
	First downs	
	Rushes–yards	
	Passing yards	
	Passes	
	Sacked–yards	
	Net passing yards	
	Total yards	
	Return yards	
	Punts	
	Fumbles–lost	
	Penalties–yards	

=== Week P3 (Sunday, August 18, 1974): vs. Buffalo Bills ===
Preseason week 3: Buffalo Bills 16 at Washington Redskins 15 – Game summary

Quarter	1	2	3	4	Total
Bills	0	6	7	3	16
Redskins	3	6	0	6	15

at RFK Stadium • Washington, D.C.

- Date: August 18, 1974
- Game time: 8:00 p.m. EDT
- Game attendance: 28,409
- TV: WMAL-TV

Team	Category	Player	Statistics
BUF	Passing		
BUF	Rushing		
BUF	Receiving		
WAS	Passing		
WAS	Rushing		
WAS	Receiving		

Scoring summary

Quarter	Time	Drive			Team	Scoring information	Score	
Quarter	Time	Plays	Yards	TOP	Team	Scoring information	BUF	WAS
"TOP" = time of possession. For other American football terms, see Glossary of American football.							16	15

- Time of game:

Bills	Game statistics	Redskins
	First downs	
	Rushes–yards	
	Passing yards	
	Passes	
	Sacked–yards	
	Net passing yards	
	Total yards	
	Return yards	
	Punts	
	Fumbles–lost	
	Penalties–yards	

=== Week P4 (Saturday, August 24, 1974): at Cleveland Browns ===
Preseason week 4: Washington Redskins 20 at Cleveland Browns 17 – Game summary

Quarter	1	2	3	4	Total
Redskins	0	3	7	10	20
Browns	3	7	7	0	17

at Cleveland Municipal Stadium • Cleveland, Ohio

- Date: August 24, 1974
- Game time: 8:00 p.m. EDT
- Game attendance: 44,528
- TV: WMAL-TV

Team	Category	Player	Statistics
WAS	Passing		
WAS	Rushing		
WAS	Receiving		
CLE	Passing		
CLE	Rushing		
CLE	Receiving		

Scoring summary

Quarter	Time	Drive			Team	Scoring information	Score	
Quarter	Time	Plays	Yards	TOP	Team	Scoring information	WAS	CLE
"TOP" = time of possession. For other American football terms, see Glossary of American football.							20	17

- Time of game:

Redskins	Game statistics	Browns
	First downs	
	Rushes–yards	
	Passing yards	
	Passes	
	Sacked–yards	
	Net passing yards	
	Total yards	
	Return yards	
	Punts	
	Fumbles–lost	
	Penalties–yards	

=== Week P5 (Friday, August 30, 1974): vs. Pittsburgh Steelers ===
Preseason week 5: Pittsburgh Steelers 21 at Washington Redskins 19 – Game summary

Quarter	1	2	3	4	Total
Steelers	0	14	0	7	21
Redskins	7	6	0	6	19

at RFK Stadium • Washington, D.C.

- Date: August 30, 1974
- Game time: 9:00 p.m. EDT
- Game attendance: 42,327
- TV: CBS

Team	Category	Player	Statistics
PIT	Passing		
PIT	Rushing		
PIT	Receiving		
WAS	Passing		
WAS	Rushing		
WAS	Receiving		

Scoring summary

Quarter	Time	Drive			Team	Scoring information	Score	
Quarter	Time	Plays	Yards	TOP	Team	Scoring information	PIT	WAS
"TOP" = time of possession. For other American football terms, see Glossary of American football.							21	19

- Time of game:

Steelers	Game statistics	Redskins
	First downs	
	Rushes–yards	
	Passing yards	
	Passes	
	Sacked–yards	
	Net passing yards	
	Total yards	
	Return yards	
	Punts	
	Fumbles–lost	
	Penalties–yards	

=== Week P6 (Friday, September 6, 1974): vs. Baltimore Colts ===
Preseason week 6: Baltimore Colts 6 at Washington Redskins 7 – Game summary

Quarter	1	2	3	4	Total
Colts	3	3	0	0	6
Redskins	0	0	7	0	7

at RFK Stadium • Washington, D.C.

- Date: September 6, 1974
- Game time: 8:00 p.m. EDT
- Game attendance: 29,704
- TV: WMAL-TV

Team	Category	Player	Statistics
BAL	Passing		
BAL	Rushing		
BAL	Receiving		
WAS	Passing		
WAS	Rushing		
WAS	Receiving		

Scoring summary

Quarter	Time	Drive			Team	Scoring information	Score	
Quarter	Time	Plays	Yards	TOP	Team	Scoring information	BAL	WAS
"TOP" = time of possession. For other American football terms, see Glossary of American football.							6	7

- Time of game:

Colts	Game statistics	Redskins
	First downs	
	Rushes–yards	
	Passing yards	
	Passes	
	Sacked–yards	
	Net passing yards	
	Total yards	
	Return yards	
	Punts	
	Fumbles–lost	
	Penalties–yards	

== Regular season ==
=== Schedule ===
Week	Date	Opponent	Result	Record	Venue	Attendance	Recap
1	September 15	at **New York Giants**	**W** 13–10	1–0	Yale Bowl	49,849	Recap
2	September 22	**St. Louis Cardinals**	**L** 10–17	1–1	RFK Stadium	53,888	Recap
3	September 30	Denver Broncos	**W** 30–3	2–1	RFK Stadium	54,395	Recap
4	October 6	at Cincinnati Bengals	**L** 17–28	2–2	Riverfront Stadium	56,175	Recap
5	October 13	Miami Dolphins	**W** 20–17	3–2	RFK Stadium	54,395	Recap
6	October 20	**New York Giants**	**W** 24–3	4–2	RFK Stadium	53,879	Recap
7	October 27	at **St. Louis Cardinals**	**L** 20–23	4–3	Busch Memorial Stadium	49,410	Recap
8	November 3	at Green Bay Packers	**W** 17–6	5–3	Lambeau Field	55,288	Recap
9	November 10	at **Philadelphia Eagles**	**W** 27–20	6–3	Veterans Stadium	65,947	Recap
10	November 17	**Dallas Cowboys**	**W** 28–21	7–3	RFK Stadium	54,395	Recap
11	November 24	**Philadelphia Eagles**	**W** 26–7	8–3	RFK Stadium	54,395	Recap
12	November 28	at **Dallas Cowboys**	**L** 23–24	8–4	Texas Stadium	63,243	Recap
13	December 9	at Los Angeles Rams	**W** 23–17	9–4	Los Angeles Memorial Coliseum	87,313	Recap
14	December 15	Chicago Bears	**W** 42–0	10–4	RFK Stadium	52,085	Recap
Note: Intra-division opponents are in **bold** text.

=== Standings ===
NFC East
	W	L	T	PCT	DIV	CONF	PF	PA	STK
St. Louis Cardinals	10	4	0	.714	7–1	8–3	285	218	W1
Washington Redskins	10	4	0	.714	5–3	8–3	320	196	W2
Dallas Cowboys	8	6	0	.571	4–4	6–5	297	235	L1
Philadelphia Eagles	7	7	0	.500	3–5	5–6	242	217	W3
New York Giants	2	12	0	.143	1–7	1–10	195	299	L6

== Regular season game summaries ==
=== Week 1 (Sunday, September 15, 1974): at New York Giants ===
Week 1: Washington Redskins 13 at New York Giants 10 – Game summary

Quarter	1	2	3	4	Total
Redskins (1–0)	7	6	0	0	13
Giants (0–1)	3	0	7	0	10

at Yale Bowl • New Haven, Connecticut

- Date: September 15, 1974
- Game time: 1:00 p.m. EDT
- Game weather: 63 °F (17 °C); relative humidity 61%; wind 10 miles per hour (16 km/h; 8.7 kn) (Scattered Clouds)
- Game attendance: 49,849
- Referee: Cal Lepore
- TV announcers (CBS): Jack Buck (play-by-play) and Pat Summerall (color commentator)

Team	Category	Player	Statistics
WAS	Passing	Billy Kilmer	9/19, 83 YDS, 1 INT
WAS	Rushing	Larry Brown	20 CAR, 75 YDS, 1 TD
WAS	Receiving	Jerry Smith	4 REC, 15 YDS
NYG	Passing	Norm Snead	9/22, 69 YDS, 2 INTs
NYG	Rushing	Doug Kotar	14 CAR, 43 YDS, 1 TD
NYG	Receiving	Bob Tucker	3 REC, 43 YDS

Scoring summary

Quarter	Time	Drive			Team	Scoring information	Score	
Quarter	Time	Plays	Yards	TOP	Team	Scoring information	WAS	NYG
1		—	—	—	Redskins	Fumble recovery returned 28 yards for touchdown by Bass, Moseley kick good	7	0
1					Giants	33-yard field goal by Gogolak	7	3
2					Redskins	Brown 5-yard touchdown run, Moseley kick no good	13	3
3					Giants	Kotar 6-yard touchdown run, Gogolak kick good	13	10
"TOP" = time of possession. For other American football terms, see Glossary of American football.							13	10

- Point spread: Redskins –7
- Time of game:

Redskins	Game statistics	Giants
13	First downs	12
39–128	Rushes–yards	36–98
109	Passing yards	69
13–23–1	Passes	9–22–2
0–0	Sacked–yards	1–9
109	Net passing yards	60
237	Total yards	158
177	Return yards	116
7–34.4	Punts	7–44.6
1–1	Fumbles–lost	3–2
5–50	Penalties–yards	4–30

=== Week 2 (Sunday, September 22, 1974): vs. St. Louis Cardinals ===
Week 2: St. Louis Cardinals 17 at Washington Redskins 10 – Game summary

Quarter	1	2	3	4	Total
Cardinals (2–0)	7	7	3	0	17
Redskins (1–1)	3	7	0	0	10

at RFK Stadium • Washington, D.C.

- Date: September 22, 1974
- Game time: 1:00 p.m. EDT
- Game weather: 63 °F (17 °C); relative humidity 61%; wind 10 miles per hour (16 km/h; 8.7 kn) (Scattered Clouds)
- Game attendance: 53,888
- Referee: Norm Schachter
- TV announcers (CBS): Frank Glieber (play-by-play) and Bart Starr (color commentator)

Team	Category	Player	Statistics
STL	Passing	Jim Hart	9/17, 56 YDS
STL	Rushing	Terry Metcalf	7 CAR, 95 YDS, 1 TD
STL	Receiving	Terry Metcalf	4 REC, 19 YDS
WAS	Passing	Billy Kilmer	19/33, 212 YDS, 1 TD, 1 INT
WAS	Rushing	Duane Thomas	26 CAR, 98 YDS
WAS	Receiving	Larry Smith	5 REC, 31 YDS

Scoring summary

Quarter	Time	Drive			Team	Scoring information	Score	
Quarter	Time	Plays	Yards	TOP	Team	Scoring information	STL	WAS
1					Redskins	28-yard field goal by Moseley	0	3
1		—	—	—	Cardinals	Fumble recovery returned 71 yards for touchdown by Yankowski, Bakken kick good	7	3
2					Cardinals	Metcalf 75-yard touchdown run, Bakken kick good	14	3
2					Redskins	Reed 11-yard touchdown reception from Kilmer, Moseley kick good	14	10
3					Redskins	46-yard field goal by Bakken	17	10
"TOP" = time of possession. For other American football terms, see Glossary of American football.							17	10

- Point spread: Redskins –9
- Time of game:

Cardinals	Game statistics	Redskins
12	First downs	21
29–175	Rushes–yards	39–132
56	Passing yards	212
9–17–0	Passes	19–33–1
1–7	Sacked–yards	2–12
49	Net passing yards	200
224	Total yards	332
83	Return yards	99
4–37.8	Punts	3–42.0
1–0	Fumbles–lost	1–1
4–48	Penalties–yards	2–18

=== Week 3 (Monday, September 30, 1974): vs. Denver Broncos ===
Week 3: Denver Broncos 3 at Washington Redskins 30 – Game summary

Quarter	1	2	3	4	Total
Broncos (0–2–1)	0	0	3	0	3
Redskins (2–1)	7	6	0	17	30

at RFK Stadium • Washington, D.C.

- Date: September 30, 1974
- Game time: 9:00 p.m. EDT
- Game weather: 64 °F (18 °C); relative humidity 46%; wind 16 miles per hour (26 km/h; 14 kn) (Clear)
- Game attendance: 54,395
- Referee: Fred Silva
- TV announcers (ABC): Frank Gifford (play-by-play), Howard Cosell (color commentator) and Alex Karras (color commentator)

Team	Category	Player	Statistics
DEN	Passing	Charley Johnson	11/22, 112 YDS
DEN	Rushing	Otis Armstrong	11 CAR, 32 YDS
DEN	Receiving	Riley Odoms	3 REC, 42 YDS
WAS	Passing	Billy Kilmer	17/23, 223 YDS, 2 TDs
WAS	Rushing	Larry Brown	24 CAR, 47 YDS
WAS	Receiving	Charley Taylor	6 REC, 59 YDS, 2 TDs

Scoring summary

Quarter	Time	Drive			Team	Scoring information	Score	
Quarter	Time	Plays	Yards	TOP	Team	Scoring information	DEN	WAS
1	9:43				Redskins	Taylor 3-yard touchdown reception from Kilmer, Moseley kick good	0	7
2	11:36				Redskins	37-yard field goal by Moseley	0	10
2	2:45				Redskins	22-yard field goal by Moseley	0	13
3	1:43				Broncos	34-yard field goal by Turner	3	13
4	9:57				Redskins	18-yard field goal by Moseley	3	16
4	3:59				Redskins	Taylor 11-yard touchdown reception from Kilmer, Moseley kick good	3	23
4	0:11				Redskins	Brown 1-yard touchdown run, Moseley kick good	3	30
"TOP" = time of possession. For other American football terms, see Glossary of American football.							3	30

- Point spread: Redskins –3
- Time of game: 2 hours, 48 minutes

Broncos	Game statistics	Redskins
10	First downs	21
23–53	Rushes–yards	42–100
119	Passing yards	245
12–24–1	Passes	20–26–0
2–13	Sacked–yards	0–0
106	Net passing yards	245
159	Total yards	345
148	Return yards	119
6–36.3	Punts	5–41.2
3–2	Fumbles–lost	1–1
4–17	Penalties–yards	5–34

=== Week 4 (Sunday, October 6, 1974): at Cincinnati Bengals ===
Week 4: Washington Redskins 17 at Cincinnati Bengals 28 – Game summary

Quarter	1	2	3	4	Total
Redskins (2–2)	0	3	0	14	17
Bengals (3–1)	7	7	7	7	28

at Riverfront Stadium • Cincinnati, Ohio

- Date: October 6, 1974
- Game time: 1:00 p.m. EDT
- Game weather: 58 °F (14 °C); relative humidity 53%; wind 10 miles per hour (16 km/h; 8.7 kn) (Clear)
- Game attendance: 56,175
- Referee: Bernie Ulman
- TV announcers (CBS): Don Criqui (play-by-play) and Pat Summerall (color commentator)

Team	Category	Player	Statistics
WAS	Passing	Billy Kilmer	12/21, 148 YDS
WAS	Rushing	Larry Brown	26 CAR, 63 YDS
WAS	Receiving	Jerry Smith	6 REC, 90 YDS, 1 TD
CIN	Passing	Ken Anderson	12/17, 142 YDS, 1 TD
CIN	Rushing	Ken Anderson	7 CAR, 70 YDS
CIN	Receiving	Boobie Clark	4 REC, 47 YDS

Scoring summary

Quarter	Time	Drive			Team	Scoring information	Score	
Quarter	Time	Plays	Yards	TOP	Team	Scoring information	WAS	CIN
1		—	—	—	Bengals	Parrish 90-yard kickoff return for a touchdown, Muhlmann kick good	0	7
2					Bengals	Curtis 24-yard touchdown reception from Anderson, Muhlmann kick good	0	14
2					Redskins	31-yard field goal by Moseley	3	14
3		—	—	—	Bengals	Fumble recovery returned 47 yards for touchdown by Parrish, Muhlmann kick good	3	21
4					Bengals	Clark 3-yard touchdown run, Muhlmann kick good	3	28
4					Redskins	Denson 4-yard touchdown reception from Jurgensen, Moseley kick good	10	28
4					Redskins	Smith 22-yard touchdown reception from Jurgensen, Moseley kick good	17	28
"TOP" = time of possession. For other American football terms, see Glossary of American football.							17	28

- Point spread: Redskins +4½
- Time of game:

Redskins	Game statistics	Bengals
24	First downs	14
34–110	Rushes–yards	30–99
252	Passing yards	142
24–41–0	Passes	12–18–0
3–25	Sacked–yards	1–10
227	Net passing yards	132
337	Total yards	221
149	Return yards	193
6–39.8	Punts	6–41.3
1–1	Fumbles–lost	2–1
4–29	Penalties–yards	5–43

=== Week 5 (Sunday, October 13, 1974): vs. Miami Dolphins ===
Week 5: Miami Dolphins 17 at Washington Redskins 20 – Game summary

Quarter	1	2	3	4	Total
Dolphins (3–2)	0	7	3	7	17
Redskins (3–2)	0	0	3	17	20

at RFK Stadium • Washington, D.C.

- Date: October 13, 1974
- Game time: 1:05 p.m. EDT
- Game weather: 66 °F (19 °C); relative humidity 71%; wind 8 miles per hour (13 km/h; 7.0 kn) (Overcast)
- Game attendance: 54,395
- Referee: Gordon McCarter
- TV announcers (NBC): Jay Randolph (play-by-play) and Al DeRogatis (color commentator)

Team	Category	Player	Statistics
MIA	Passing	Bob Griese	11/24, 139 YDS, 1 TD, 2 INTs
MIA	Rushing	Larry Csonka	18 CAR, 58 YDS
MIA	Receiving	Howard Twilley	4 REC, 43 YDS, 1 TD
WAS	Passing	Sonny Jurgensen	26/39, 303 YDS, 2 TDs, 3 INTs
WAS	Rushing	Larry Brown	10 CAR, 16 YDS
WAS	Receiving	Larry Smith	8 REC, 61 YDS, 1 TD

Scoring summary

Quarter	Time	Drive			Team	Scoring information	Score	
Quarter	Time	Plays	Yards	TOP	Team	Scoring information	MIA	WAS
2	11:07				Dolphins	Ginn 6-yard touchdown run, Yepremian kick good	7	0
3	2:57				Redskins	32-yard field goal by Yepremian	10	0
3	0:16				Redskins	40-yard field goal by Moseley	10	3
4	14:53				Redskins	Jefferson 37-yard touchdown reception from Jurgensen, Moseley kick good	10	10
4	9:42				Redskins	41-yard field goal by Moseley	10	13
4	1:46				Dolphins	Twilley 13-yard touchdown reception from Griese, Yepremian kick good	17	13
4	0:16				Redskins	Smith 6-yard touchdown reception from Jurgensen, Moseley kick good	17	20
"TOP" = time of possession. For other American football terms, see Glossary of American football.							17	20

- Point spread: Redskins +5
- Time of game: 2 hours, 40 minutes

Dolphins	Game statistics	Redskins
16	First downs	15
39–107	Rushes–yards	18–26
139	Passing yards	303
11–24–2	Passes	26–39–3
2–13	Sacked–yards	1–4
126	Net passing yards	299
233	Total yards	325
89	Return yards	207
5–41.2	Punts	2–36.5
2–1	Fumbles–lost	1–1
3–20	Penalties–yards	6–47

=== Week 6 (Sunday, October 20, 1974): vs. New York Giants ===
Week 6: New York Giants 3 at Washington Redskins 24 – Game summary

Quarter	1	2	3	4	Total
Giants (1–5)	0	3	0	0	3
Redskins (4–2)	0	7	14	3	24

at RFK Stadium • Washington, D.C.

- Date: October 20, 1974
- Game time: 1:00 p.m. EDT
- Game weather: 42 °F (6 °C); relative humidity 51%; wind 12 miles per hour (19 km/h; 10 kn) (Mostly Cloudy)
- Game attendance: 53,879
- Referee: Tom Bell
- TV announcers (CBS): Brent Musburger (play-by-play), Pat Summerall (color commentator) and Jane Chastain (sideline reporter)

Team	Category	Player	Statistics
NYG	Passing	Norm Snead	9/17, 61 YDS, 2 INTs
NYG	Rushing	Doug Kotar	14 CAR, 26 YDS
NYG	Receiving	Joe Dawkins	4 REC, 14 YDS
WAS	Passing	Sonny Jurgensen	17/30, 174 YDS, 3 TDs, 1 INT
WAS	Rushing	Moses Denson	9 CAR, 53 YDS
WAS	Receiving	Charley Taylor	6 REC, 59 YDS

Scoring summary

Quarter	Time	Drive			Team	Scoring information	Score	
Quarter	Time	Plays	Yards	TOP	Team	Scoring information	NYG	WAS
1					Giants	30-yard field goal by Gogolak	3	0
2					Redskins	Jefferson 2-yard touchdown reception from Jurgensen, Moseley kick good	3	7
2					Redskins	Brown 10-yard touchdown reception from Jurgensen, Moseley kick good	3	14
2					Redskins	Denson 15-yard touchdown reception from Jurgensen, Moseley kick good	3	21
4					Redskins	37-yard field goal by Moseley	3	24
"TOP" = time of possession. For other American football terms, see Glossary of American football.							3	24

- Point spread: Redskins –13½
- Time of game:

Giants	Game statistics	Redskins
10	First downs	18
28–57	Rushes–yards	29–80
120	Passing yards	181
15–29–5	Passes	20–36–1
1–6	Sacked–yards	3–15
114	Net passing yards	166
171	Total yards	246
119	Return yards	110
5–36.4	Punts	6–37.2
1–1	Fumbles–lost	2–1
6–61	Penalties–yards	9–70

=== Week 7 (Sunday, October 27, 1974): at St. Louis Cardinals ===
Week 7: Washington Redskins 20 at St. Louis Cardinals 23 – Game summary

Quarter	1	2	3	4	Total
Redskins (4–3)	0	10	3	7	20
Cardinals (7–0)	9	7	7	0	23

at Busch Memorial Stadium • St. Louis, Missouri

- Date: October 27, 1974
- Game time: 2:00 p.m. EST
- Game weather: 60 °F (16 °C); relative humidity 53%; wind 6 miles per hour (9.7 km/h; 5.2 kn) (More Than Half Cloudy)
- Game attendance: 49,410
- Referee: Fred Swearingen
- TV announcers (CBS): Pat Summerall (play-by-play) and Tom Brookshier (color commentator)

Team	Category	Player	Statistics
WAS	Passing	Sonny Jurgensen	20/29, 201 YDS, 2 TDs, 1 INT
WAS	Rushing	Moses Denson	17 CAR, 77 YDS
WAS	Receiving	Jerry Smith	5 REC, 40 YDS
STL	Passing	Jim Hart	15/19, 200 YDS, 2 TDs
STL	Rushing	Jim Otis	11 CAR, 51 YDS
STL	Receiving	Earl Thomas	4 REC, 106 YDS, 1 TD

Scoring summary

Quarter	Time	Drive			Team	Scoring information	Score	
Quarter	Time	Plays	Yards	TOP	Team	Scoring information	WAS	STL
1		—	—	—	Cardinals	Interception returned 53 yards for touchdown by Wehrli, Bakken kick no good (blocked)	0	6
1					Redskins	47-yard field goal by Bakken	0	9
2					Cardinals	Thomas 52-yard touchdown reception from Hart, Bakken kick good	0	16
2					Redskins	48-yard field goal by Moseley	3	16
2					Redskins	Brown 2-yard touchdown reception from Jurgensen, Moseley kick good	10	16
3					Redskins	34-yard field goal by Moseley	13	16
3					Cardinals	Anderson 17-yard touchdown reception from Hart, Bakken kick good	13	23
4					Redskins	Brown 13-yard touchdown reception from Jurgensen, Moseley kick good	20	23
"TOP" = time of possession. For other American football terms, see Glossary of American football.							20	23

- Point spread: Redskins Pick'em
- Time of game:

Redskins	Game statistics	Cardinals
19	First downs	15
30–116	Rushes–yards	27–115
201	Passing yards	200
20–29–1	Passes	15–20–0
4–25	Sacked–yards	1–10
176	Net passing yards	190
292	Total yards	305
124	Return yards	165
4–33.5	Punts	3–39.3
1–0	Fumbles–lost	1–0
1–5	Penalties–yards	6–45

=== Week 8 (Sunday, November 3, 1974): at Green Bay Packers ===
Week 8: Washington Redskins 17 at St. Louis Cardinals 6 – Game summary

Quarter	1	2	3	4	Total
Redskins (5–3)	0	3	7	7	17
Packers (3–5)	3	3	0	0	6

at Lambeau Field • Green Bay, Wisconsin

- Date: November 3, 1974
- Game time: 2:00 p.m. EST
- Game weather: 40 °F (4 °C); relative humidity 72%; wind 12 miles per hour (19 km/h; 10 kn) (Overcast)
- Game attendance: 55,288
- Referee: Fred Silva
- TV announcers (CBS): Frank Glieber (play-by-play) and Tommy Mason (color commentator)

Team	Category	Player	Statistics
WAS	Passing	Billy Kilmer	14/24, 159 YDS, 1 TD, 2 INTs
WAS	Rushing	Moses Denson	13 CAR, 47 YDS
WAS	Receiving	Moses Denson	4 REC, 9 YDS
GB	Passing	John Hadl	9/15, 99 YDS, 1 INT
GB	Rushing	John Brockington	20 CAR, 78 YDS
GB	Receiving	John Brockington	6 REC, 25 YDS

Scoring summary

Quarter	Time	Drive			Team	Scoring information	Score	
Quarter	Time	Plays	Yards	TOP	Team	Scoring information	WAS	GB
1					Packers	29-yard field goal by Marcol	0	3
2					Redskins	40-yard field goal by Moseley	3	3
2					Packers	46-yard field goal by Marcol	3	6
3					Redskins	Grant 22-yard touchdown reception from Kilmer, Moseley kick good	10	6
4		—	—	—	Redskins	Interception returned 14 yards for touchdown by McLinton, Moseley kick good	17	6
"TOP" = time of possession. For other American football terms, see Glossary of American football.							17	6

- Point spread: Redskins –3
- Time of game:

Redskins	Game statistics	Packers
14	First downs	15
36–100	Rushes–yards	30–96
159	Passing yards	166
14–24–2	Passes	17–35–3
3–22	Sacked–yards	1–8
137	Net passing yards	158
237	Total yards	254
116	Return yards	111
7–38.9	Punts	7–40.3
1–0	Fumbles–lost	0–0
8–45	Penalties–yards	4–30

=== Week 9 (Sunday, November 10, 1974): at Philadelphia Eagles ===
Week 9: Washington Redskins 27 at Philadelphia Eagles 20 – Game summary

Quarter	1	2	3	4	Total
Redskins (6–3)	7	0	10	10	27
Eagles (4–5)	7	7	6	0	20

at Veterans Stadium • Philadelphia, Pennsylvania

- Date: November 10, 1974
- Game time: 1:00 p.m. EST
- Game weather: 51 °F (11 °C); relative humidity 44%; wind 8 miles per hour (13 km/h; 7.0 kn) (Mostly Clear)
- Game attendance: 65,947
- Referee: Bob Frederic
- TV announcers (CBS): Pat Summerall (play-by-play) and Tom Brookshier (color commentator)

Team	Category	Player	Statistics
WAS	Passing	Sonny Jurgensen	14/23, 172 YDS, 1 TD
WAS	Rushing	Larry Brown	7 CAR, 28 YDS
WAS	Receiving	Charley Taylor	9 REC, 155 YDS, 1 TD
PHI	Passing	Roman Gabriel	24/47, 211 YDS, 3 TDs, 2 INTs
PHI	Rushing	Tom Sullivan	16 CAR, 29 YDS
PHI	Receiving	Don Zimmerman	5 REC, 61 YDS

Scoring summary

Quarter	Time	Drive			Team	Scoring information	Score	
Quarter	Time	Plays	Yards	TOP	Team	Scoring information	WAS	PHI
1					Eagles	Carmichael 6-yard touchdown reception from Gabriel, Dempsey kick good	0	7
1					Redskins	Thomas 1-yard touchdown run, Moseley kick good	7	7
2					Eagles	Carmichael 13-yard touchdown reception from Gabriel, Dempsey kick good	7	14
3					Eagles	Sullivan 1-yard touchdown reception from Gabriel, Dempsey kick no good (run failed)	7	20
3		—	—	—	Redskins	Fumble recovery returned 0 yards for touchdown by Hanburger, Moseley kick good	14	20
3					Redskins	40-yard field goal by Moseley	17	20
4					Redskins	35-yard field goal by Moseley	20	20
4					Redskins	Taylor 40-yard touchdown reception from Jurgensen, Moseley kick good	27	20
"TOP" = time of possession. For other American football terms, see Glossary of American football.							27	20

- Point spread: Redskins –6½
- Time of game:

Redskins	Game statistics	Eagles
15	First downs	23
23–46	Rushes–yards	31–84
258	Passing yards	211
21–42–1	Passes	24–48–2
4–33	Sacked–yards	2–28
225	Net passing yards	183
271	Total yards	267
164	Return yards	182
7–41.3	Punts	9–33.0
0–0	Fumbles–lost	2–1
9–67	Penalties–yards	6–47

=== Week 10 (Sunday, November 17, 1974): vs. Dallas Cowboys ===
Week 10: Dallas Cowboys 21 at Washington Redskins 28 – Game summary

Quarter	1	2	3	4	Total
Cowboys (5–5)	0	0	7	14	21
Redskins (7–3)	7	21	0	0	28

at RFK Stadium • Washington, D.C.

- Date: November 17, 1974
- Game time: 4:00 p.m. EST
- Game weather: 45 °F (7 °C); relative humidity 59%; wind 9 miles per hour (14 km/h; 7.8 kn) (Scattered Clouds)
- Game attendance: 54,395
- Referee: Bernie Ulman
- TV announcers (CBS): Pat Summerall (play-by-play) and Tom Brookshier (color commentator)

Team	Category	Player	Statistics
DAL	Passing	Roger Staubach	16/38, 174 YDS, 2 TDs, 1 INT
DAL	Rushing	Calvin Hill	16 CAR, 67 YDS
DAL	Receiving	Billy Joe DuPree	6 REC, 92 YDS, 2 TDs
WAS	Passing	Billy Kilmer	11/19, 161 YDS, 1 TD
WAS	Rushing	Charlie Evans	15 CAR, 42 YDS, 1 TD
WAS	Receiving	Roy Jefferson	4 REC, 87 YDS, 1 TD

Scoring summary

Quarter	Time	Drive			Team	Scoring information	Score	
Quarter	Time	Plays	Yards	TOP	Team	Scoring information	DAL	WAS
1					Redskins	Theismann 3-yard touchdown run, Moseley kick good	0	7
2					Redskins	Evans 6-yard touchdown run, Moseley kick good	0	14
2		—	—	—	Redskins	Houston 58-yard kickoff return for a touchdown, Moseley kick good	0	21
2					Redskins	Jefferson 31-yard touchdown reception from Kilmer, Moseley kick good	0	28
3					Cowboys	DuPree 10-yard touchdown reception from Staubach, Herrera kick good	7	28
3					Cowboys	Newhouse 3-yard touchdown run, Herrera kick good	14	28
4					Cowboys	DuPree 4-yard touchdown reception from Staubach, Herrera kick good	21	28
"TOP" = time of possession. For other American football terms, see Glossary of American football.							21	28

- Point spread: Redskins –1½
- Time of game:

Cowboys	Game statistics	Redskins
18	First downs	13
31–152	Rushes–yards	37–100
174	Passing yards	161
16–38–1	Passes	11–19–0
5–30	Sacked–yards	1–9
144	Net passing yards	152
296	Total yards	252
127	Return yards	146
8–39.4	Punts	9–35.0
1–0	Fumbles–lost	2–1
7–55	Penalties–yards	4–20

=== Week 11 (Sunday, November 24, 1974): vs. Philadelphia Eagles ===
Week 11: Philadelphia Eagles 7 at Washington Redskins 26 – Game summary

Quarter	1	2	3	4	Total
Eagles (4–7)	0	0	7	0	7
Redskins (8–3)	3	10	7	6	26

at RFK Stadium • Washington, D.C.

- Date: November 24, 1974
- Game time: 1:00 p.m. EST
- Game weather: 50 °F (10 °C); relative humidity 57%; wind 10 miles per hour (16 km/h; 8.7 kn) (Mostly Clear)
- Game attendance: 54,395
- Referee: Pat Haggerty
- TV announcers (CBS): Lindsey Nelson (play-by-play) and Bart Starr (color commentator)

Team	Category	Player	Statistics
PHI	Passing	Roman Gabriel	18/28, 163 YDS, 1 TD, 1 INT
PHI	Rushing	Tom Sullivan	19 CAR, 76 YDS
PHI	Receiving	Charle Young	5 REC, 52 YDS
WAS	Passing	Billy Kilmer	18/24, 172 YDS, 1 TD
WAS	Rushing	Duane Thomas	20 CAR, 65 YDS, 1 TD
WAS	Receiving	Roy Jefferson	5 REC, 56 YDS

Scoring summary

Quarter	Time	Drive			Team	Scoring information	Score	
Quarter	Time	Plays	Yards	TOP	Team	Scoring information	PHI	WAS
1					Redskins	37-yard field goal by Moseley	0	3
2					Redskins	38-yard field goal by Moseley	0	6
2					Redskins	Smith 2-yard touchdown reception from Kilmer, Moseley kick good	0	13
3					Eagles	Carmichael 3-yard touchdown reception from Gabriel, Dempsey kick good	7	13
3		—	—	—	Redskins	Jones 102-yard kickoff return for a touchdown, Moseley kick good	7	20
4					Redskins	Thomas 3-yard touchdown run, Moseley kick no good	7	26
"TOP" = time of possession. For other American football terms, see Glossary of American football.							7	26

- Point spread: Redskins –10
- Time of game:

Eagles	Game statistics	Redskins
14	First downs	19
24–79	Rushes–yards	41–131
163	Passing yards	172
18–29–2	Passes	18–24–0
3–28	Sacked–yards	0–0
135	Net passing yards	172
214	Total yards	303
113	Return yards	177
4–36.0	Punts	4–34.0
4–3	Fumbles–lost	2–0
4–20	Penalties–yards	4–41

=== Week 12 (Thursday, November 28, 1974): at Dallas Cowboys ===
Week 12: Washington Redskins 23 at Dallas Cowboys 24 – Game summary

Quarter	1	2	3	4	Total
Redskins (8–4)	3	6	7	7	23
Cowboys (7–5)	3	0	14	7	24

at Texas Stadium • Irving, Texas

- Date: November 28, 1974
- Game time: 2:45 p.m. EST
- Game weather: 50 °F (10 °C); relative humidity 59%; wind 11 miles per hour (18 km/h; 9.6 kn) (Scattered Clouds)
- Game attendance: 63,243
- Referee: Jim Tunney
- TV announcers (CBS): Pat Summerall (play-by-play), Tom Brookshier (color commentator), Bart Starr (color commentator) and Frank Glieber (sideline reporter)

Team	Category	Player	Statistics
WAS	Passing	Billy Kilmer	8/17, 112 YDS, 1 TD
WAS	Rushing	Duane Thomas	18 CAR, 55 YDS, 1 TD
WAS	Receiving	Roy Jefferson	2 REC, 49 YDS
DAL	Passing	Clint Longley	11/20, 203 YDS, 2 TDs
DAL	Rushing	Robert Newhouse	16 CAR, 66 YDS
DAL	Receiving	Drew Pearson	5 REC, 108 YDS, 1 TD

Scoring summary

Quarter	Time	Drive			Team	Scoring information	Score	
Quarter	Time	Plays	Yards	TOP	Team	Scoring information	WAS	DAL
1					Cowboys	24-yard field goal by Herrera	0	3
1					Redskins	45-yard field goal by Moseley	3	3
2					Redskins	34-yard field goal by Moseley	6	3
2					Redskins	39-yard field goal by Moseley	9	3
3					Redskins	Thomas 9-yard touchdown reception from Kilmer, Moseley kick good	16	3
3					Cowboys	DuPree 35-yard touchdown reception from Longley, Herrera kick good	16	10
3					Cowboyss	Garrison 70-yard touchdown run, Herrera kick good	16	17
4					Redskins	Thomas 19-yard touchdown run, Moseley kick good	23	17
4					Cowboys	Pearson 50-yard touchdown reception from Longley, Herrera kick good	23	24
"TOP" = time of possession. For other American football terms, see Glossary of American football.							23	24

- Point spread: Redskins Pick'em
- Time of game:

Redskins	Game statistics	Cowboys
11	First downs	23
33–105	Rushes–yards	38–134
112	Passing yards	272
8–17–0	Passes	15–32–1
1–10	Sacked–yards	4–33
102	Net passing yards	239
207	Total yards	373
123	Return yards	101
5–42.2	Punts	3–40.0
1–1	Fumbles–lost	4–4
5–38	Penalties–yards	6–26

Thanksgiving Day

Diron Talbert knocked Roger Staubach out of the game.

=== Week 13 (Monday, December 9, 1974): at Los Angeles Rams ===
Week 13: Washington Redskins 23 at Los Angeles Rams 17 – Game summary

Quarter	1	2	3	4	Total
Redskins (9–4)	0	20	3	0	23
Rams (9–4)	10	0	7	0	17

at Los Angeles Memorial Coliseum • Los Angeles, California

- Date: December 9, 1974
- Game time: 9:00 p.m. EST
- Game attendance: 87,313
- Referee: Bernie Ulman
- TV announcers (ABC): Frank Gifford (play-by-play), Howard Cosell (color commentator) and Alex Karras (color commentator)

Team	Category	Player	Statistics
WAS	Passing		
WAS	Rushing		
WAS	Receiving		
LA	Passing		
LA	Rushing		
LA	Receiving		

Scoring summary

Quarter	Time	Drive			Team	Scoring information	Score	
Quarter	Time	Plays	Yards	TOP	Team	Scoring information	WAS	LA
1					Rams	37-yard field goal by Ray	0	3
1					Rams	Jackson 20-yard touchdown reception from Harris, Ray kick good	0	10
2					Redskins	Jefferson 27-yard touchdown reception from Kilmer, Bragg kick no good	6	10
2					Redskins	Brown 2-yard touchdown reception from Kilmer, Bragg kick good	13	10
2					Redskins	Smith 3-yard touchdown reception from Kilmer, Bragg kick good	20	10
3					Rams	McCutchen 9-yard touchdown run, Ray kick good	20	17
3					Redskins	25-yard field goal by Bragg	23	17
"TOP" = time of possession. For other American football terms, see Glossary of American football.							23	17

- Point spread:
- Time of game:

Redskins	Game statistics	Rams
	First downs	
	Rushes–yards	
	Passing yards	
	Passes	
	Sacked–yards	
	Net passing yards	
	Total yards	
	Return yards	
	Punts	
	Fumbles–lost	
	Penalties–yards	

=== Week 14 (Sunday, December 15, 1974): vs. Chicago Bears ===
Week 14: Chicago Bears 0 at Washington Redskins 42 – Game summary

Quarter	1	2	3	4	Total
Bears (4–10)	0	0	0	0	0
Redskins (10–4)	0	21	7	14	42

at RFK Stadium • Washington, D.C.

- Date: December 15, 1974
- Game time: 1:00 p.m. EST
- Game attendance: 52,085
- Referee: Chuck Heberling
- TV announcers (CBS): Dick Stockton (play-by-play) and Johnny Unitas (color commentator)

Team	Category	Player	Statistics
PIT	Passing		
PIT	Rushing		
PIT	Receiving		
WAS	Passing		
WAS	Rushing		
WAS	Receiving		

Scoring summary

Quarter	Time	Drive			Team	Scoring information	Score	
Quarter	Time	Plays	Yards	TOP	Team	Scoring information	CHI	WAS
2					Redskins	Brown 1-yard touchdown run, Bragg kick good	0	7
2					Redskins	Brown 4-yard touchdown run, Bragg kick good	0	14
2					Redskins	Taylor 11-yard touchdown reception from Jurgensen, Bragg kick good	0	21
3					Redskins	Taylor 13-yard touchdown reception from Theismann, Bragg kick good	0	28
4					Redskins	Thomas 14-yard touchdown run, Bragg kick good	0	35
4					Redskins	Evans 1-yard touchdown run, Jones kick good	0	42
"TOP" = time of possession. For other American football terms, see Glossary of American football.							0	42

- Point spread:
- Time of game:

Bears	Game statistics	Redskins
	First downs	
	Rushes–yards	
	Passing yards	
	Passes	
	Sacked–yards	
	Net passing yards	
	Total yards	
	Return yards	
	Punts	
	Fumbles–lost	
	Penalties–yards	

== Stats ==
Passing

Passing
Player	Pos	G	GS	QBrec	Cmp	Att	Cmp%	Yds	TD	TD%	Int	Int%	Y/A	AY/A	Y/C	Y/G	Lng	Rate	Sk	Yds	NY/A	ANY/A	Sk%	4QC	GWD
Kilmer	QB	11	10	7–3–0	137	234	58.5	1632	10	4.3	6	2.6	51	7.0	6.7	11.9	148.4	83.5	13	96	5.3	6.22	5.94		
Jurgensen	QB	14	4	3–1–0	107	167	64.1	1185	11	6.6	5	3.0	44	7.1	7.1	11.1	84.6	94.5	10	69	5.6	6.31	6.28	2	2
Theismann	QB	9	0		9	11	81.8	145	1	9.1	0	0.0	69	13.2	15.0	16.1	16.1	149.1	2	11	15.4	10.31	11.85		
Brown	RB	11	11		1	1	100.0	16	0	0.0	0	0.0	16	16.0	16.0	16.0	1.5	118.7	0	0	0.0	16.00	16.00		
Team Total		14		10–4–0	254	413	61.5	2978	22	5.3	11	2.7	69	7.2	7.1	11.7	212.7	90.0	25	176	5.7	6.40	6.27	2	2
Opp Total		14			197	399	49.4	2102	13	3.3	25	6.3		5.3	3.10	10.7	150.1	49.9	31	256	7.2	4.3	2.3		

Rushing

Rushing
Player	Pos	G	GS	Att	Yds	TD	Lng	Y/A	Y/G	A/G
Brown	RB	11	11	163	430	3	16	2.6	39.1	14.8
Denson	FB	13	8	103	391	0	23	3.8	30.1	7.9
Thomas	RB	11	3	95	347	5	66	3.7	31.5	8.6
Smith	RB	7	6	55	149	0	13	2.7	21.3	7.9
Evans	RB	6	0	32	79	2	9	2.5	13.2	5.3
Kilmer	QB	11	10	6	27	0	10	4.5	2.5	0.5
Cunningham	RB	2	0	5	17	0	5	3.4	8.5	2.5
Theismann	QB	9	0	3	12	1	12	4.0	1.3	0.3
Smith	TE	14	14	1	5	0	5	5.0	0.4	0.1
Mul-Key	RB	7	0	1	3	0	3	3.0	0.4	0.1
Taylor	WR	14	14	1	–1	0	–1	–1.0	–0.1	0.1
Jurgensen	QB	14	4	4	–6	0	0	–1.5	–0.4	0.3
Grant	WR	14	1	1	–10	0	–10	–10.0	–0.7	0.1
Team Total		14		470	1443	11	66	3.1	103.1	33.6
Opp Total		14		414	1439	7		3.5	102.8	29.6

Receiving

Receiving
Player	Pos	G	GS	Rec	Yds	Y/R	TD	Lng	R/G	Y/G	Ctch%
Taylor	WR	14	14	54	738	13.7	5	51	3.9	52.7	0.0%
Smith	TE	14	14	44	554	12.6	3	30	3.1	39.6	0.0%
Jefferson	WR	14	13	43	654	15.2	4	43	3.1	46.7	0.0%
Brown	RB	11	11	37	388	10.5	4	34	3.4	35.3	0.0%
Denson	FB	13	8	26	174	6.7	2	27	2.0	13.4	0.0%
Smith	RB	7	6	23	137	6.0	1	14	3.3	19.6	0.0%
Thomas	RB	11	3	10	31	3.1	1	9	0.9	2.8	0.0%
Grant	WR	14	1	9	196	21.8	1	69	0.6	14.0	0.0%
Reed	TE	14	0	4	36	9.0	1	11	0.3	2.6	0.0%
Evans	RB	6	0	2	44	22.0	0	44	0.3	7.3	0.0%
Cunningham	RB	2	0	2	26	13.0	0	18	1.0	13.0	0.0%
Team Total		14		254	2978	11.7	22	69	18.1	212.7	
Opp Total		14		197	1846	9.4	13		14.1	131.9	

Kicking

Kicking
		Games		0–19		20–29		30–39		40–49		50+		Scoring						
Player	Pos	G	GS	FGA	FGM	FGA	FGM	FGA	FGM	FGA	FGM	FGA	FGM	FGA	FGM	Lng	FG%	XPA	XPM	XP%
Moseley	K	13	0	1	1	5	2	13	9	10	6	1		30	18	48	60.0%	29	27	93.1%
Bragg	P	14	0			1	1							1	1	25	100.0%	8	7	87.5%
Jones	DE	14	1															1	1	100.0%
Team Total		14		1	1	6	3	13	9	10	6	1		31	19		61.3%	38	35	92.1%
Opp Total		14												15	10		66.7%	24	22	91.7%

Punting

Punting
Player	Pos	G	GS	Pnt	Yds	Lng	Blck	Y/P
Bragg	P	14	0	74	2823	57	1	38.1
Team Total		14		74	2823	57	1	38.1
Opp Total		14		80	3072			38.4

Kick Return

Kick return
Player	Pos	G	GS	Rt	Yds	TD	Lng	Y/Rt
Jones	CB	13	0	23	672	1	102	29.2
Mul-Key	RB	7	0	10	285	0	59	28.5
Evans	RB	6	0	4	60	0	19	15.0
Smith	RB	7	6	2	57	0	29	28.5
Denson	FB	13	8	2	49	0	27	24.5
Bass	RCB	14	14	1	22	0	22	22.0
Ryczek	LS	14	0	1	11	0	11	11.0
Tillman	LB	14	1	1	10	0	10	10.0
Dusek	LB	14	0	1	0	0	0	0.0
Team Total		14		45	1166	1	102	25.9
Opp Total		14		64	1379	0		21.5

Punt Return

Punt return
Player	Pos	G	GS	Ret	Yds	TD	Lng	Y/R
Theismann	QB	9	0	15	157	0	44	10.5
Mul-Key	RB	7	0	13	140	0	17	10.8
Jones	CB	13	0	8	54	0	13	6.8
Houston	SS	14	14	6	81	1	58	13.5
Duncan	DB	2	0	3	19	0	11	6.3
Stone	DB	14	0	1	2	0	2	2.0
Team Total		14		46	453	1	58	9.8
Opp Total		14		50	458	1		9.2

Sacks

Sacks
Player	Pos	G	GS	Sk
Talbert	RDT	14	14	10.0
Brundige	LDT	14	13	6.5
McDole	LDE	14	13	4.5
Biggs	RDE	14	14	4.0
Jones	DE	14	1	3.0
Johnson	DE	13	0	2.5
Hanburger	RLB	14	14	2.0
Robinson	LLB	14	14	1.5
Team Total		14		31
Opp Total		14		25

Interceptions

Interceptions
Player	Pos	G	GS	Int	Yds	TD	Lng	PD
Stone	DB	14	0	5	95	0	31	
Owens	FS	14	14	4	59	0	24	
Hanburger	RLB	14	14	4	6	0	5	
Fischer	LCB	14	14	3	52	0	30	
Bass	RCB	14	14	3	33	1	28	
Houston	SS	14	14	2	40	0	37	
Robinson	LLB	14	14	2	29	0	29	
McLinton	MLB	13	13	1	14	1	14	
Salter	DB	3	0	1	0	0	0	
Team Total		14		25	328	2	37	
Opp Total		14						

Fumbles

Fumbles
Player	Pos	G	GS	FF	Fmb	FR	Yds	TD
Kilmer	QB	11	10		3	1	0	0
Jurgensen	QB	14	4		2	2	–11	0
Evans	RB	6	0		2	1	0	0
Brown	RB	11	11		2	0	0	0
Denson	FB	13	8		1	2	0	0
Smith	TE	14	14		1	1	0	0
Houston	SS	14	14		1	0	0	0
Jefferson	WR	14	13		1	0	0	0
Jones	CB	13	0		1	0	0	0
Smith	RB	7	6		1	0	0	0
Thomas	RB	11	3		1	0	0	0
Bass	RCB	14	14		0	3	8	0
Biggs	RDE	14	14		0	3	0	0
Hanburger	RLB	14	14		0	2	0	1
McDole	LDE	14	13		0	2	0	0
Dusek	LB	14	0		0	1	0	0
McLinton	MLB	13	13		0	1	0	0
Robinson	LLB	14	14		0	1	0	0
Talbert	RDT	14	14		0	1	0	0
Team Total		14			16	21	–3	1
Opp Total		14			28	13		2

Tackles

Tackles
Player	Pos	G	GS	Comb	Solo	Ast	TFL	QBHits	Sfty
Team Total		14							
Opp Total		14							

Scoring Summary

Scoring Summary
Player	Pos	G	GS	RshTD	RecTD	PR TD	KR TD	FblTD	IntTD	OthTD	AllTD	XPM	XPA	FGM	FGA	Sfty	Pts	Pts/G
Team Total		14		11	22	1	1	1	2		38	35	38	19	31		320	
Opp Total		14		7	12	1		2	1		24	22	24	10	15		196	

Team

Team
			Total Yds & TO					Passing							Rushing					Penalties		
Player	PF	Yds	Ply	Y/P	TO	FL	1stD	Cmp	Att	Yds	TD	Int	NY/A	1stD	Att	Yds	TD	Y/A	1stD	Pen	Yds	1stPy
Team Stats	320	4245	908	4.7	20	9	249	254	413	2802	22	11	6.4	156	470	1443	11	3.1	77	78	621	16
Opp Stats	196	3285	844	3.9	40	15	210	197	399	1846	13	25	4.3	114	414	1439	7	3.5	79	69	529	17
Lg Rank Offense	4	12			2	2	10		3	1	2	2	5		14	23	18	26				
Lg Rank Defense	4	2			4	8	5		19	5	8	3	2		3	3	2	6				

Quarter-by-quarter

Quarter-by-quarter
Team	1	2	3	4	OT	T
Redskins	37	120	61	102	0	320
Opponent	49	41	71	35	0	196

== Playoffs ==
Round	Date	Opponent	Result	Venue	Attendance	Recap
Divisional	December 22	at Los Angeles Rams	L 10–19	Los Angeles Memorial Coliseum	80,118	Recap

=== NFC Divisional Playoffs (Sunday, December 22, 1974): at Los Angeles Rams ===
NFC Divisional Playoffs: Washington Redskins 10 at Los Angeles Rams 19 – Game summary

Quarter	1	2	3	4	Total
Redskins (10–5)	3	7	0	0	10
Rams (11–4)	7	0	3	9	19

at Los Angeles Memorial Coliseum • Los Angeles, California

- Date: December 22, 1974
- Game time: 4:00 p.m. EST
- Game attendance: 80,118
- Referee: Pat Haggerty
- TV announcers (CBS): Pat Summerall (play-by-play), Tom Brookshier (color commentator) and Bart Starr (color commentator)

Team	Category	Player	Statistics
WAS	Passing		
WAS	Rushing		
WAS	Receiving		
LA	Passing		
LA	Rushing		
LA	Receiving		

Scoring summary

Quarter	Time	Drive			Team	Scoring information	Score	
Quarter	Time	Plays	Yards	TOP	Team	Scoring information	WAS	LA
1					Rams	Klein 10-yard touchdown reception from Harris, Ray kick good	0	7
1					Redskins	35-yard field goal by Bragg	3	7
2					Redskins	Denson 1-yard touchdown run, Bragg kick good	10	7
3					Rams	37-yard field goal by Ray	10	10
4					Rams	37-yard field goal by Ray	10	13
4		—	—	—	Rams	Fumble recovery returned 59 yards for touchdown by Robertson, Ray kick no good	10	19
"TOP" = time of possession. For other American football terms, see Glossary of American football.							10	19

- Point spread:
- Time of game:

Redskins	Game statistics	Rams
	First downs	
	Rushes–yards	
	Passing yards	
	Passes	
	Sacked–yards	
	Net passing yards	
	Total yards	
	Return yards	
	Punts	
	Fumbles–lost	
	Penalties–yards	
