= 1974–75 NFL playoffs =

American football tournament

- Dates: December 21, 1974–January 12, 1975
- Season: 1974
- Teams: 8
- Games played: 7
- Super Bowl IX site: Tulane Stadium; New Orleans, Louisiana
- Defending champions: Miami Dolphins
- Champion: Pittsburgh Steelers (1st title)
- Runner-up: Minnesota Vikings
- Conference runners-up: Los Angeles Rams; Oakland Raiders
NFL playoffs
← 1973–74	1975–76 →

The National Football League playoffs for the 1974 season began on December 21, 1974. The postseason tournament concluded with the Pittsburgh Steelers defeating the Minnesota Vikings in Super Bowl IX, 16–6, on January 12, 1975, at Tulane Stadium in New Orleans, Louisiana.

This was the last season in which the sites for the playoff games annually alternated by division.

== Participants ==
Within each conference, the three division winners and the non-division winner with the best overall regular season record of all remaining teams in the conference qualified for the playoffs. The NFL did not use a seeding system until the 1975 season, and instead home teams during the first two rounds of the playoffs alternated by division. Thus, it is possible that a team could host another club with a better regular season record. For the Super Bowl, the championship round was played at a neutral site, the designated home team was based on an annual rotation by conference.

Playoff participants
	AFC	NFC
East winner	Miami Dolphins	St. Louis Cardinals
Central winner	Pittsburgh Steelers	Minnesota Vikings
West winner	Oakland Raiders	Los Angeles Rams
Wild card	Buffalo Bills	Washington Redskins

== Bracket ==
Note: Prior to the 1975 season, the home teams in the playoffs were decided based on a yearly rotation. Had the 1974 playoffs been seeded, the AFC divisional matchups would have been #3 Pittsburgh at #2 Miami and #4 wild card Buffalo at #1 Oakland. The NFC divisional matchups would have been #4 wild card Washington at #1 Minnesota and #3 Los Angeles at #2 St. Louis (the Cardinals, Rams and Vikings all finished 10–4, and since the Cardinals and Rams did not play in the regular season, the tiebreaker would have been winning percentage in conference games. Minnesota and St. Louis were both 8–3 (.727) vs. NFC opponents, compared to 7–3 (.700) for Los Angeles. With the Rams eliminated, the Vikings and Cardinals would then revert to the first tiebreaker step for two teams, head-to-head. Minnesota defeated St. Louis 28–24 in week nine and thus would have earned the higher seed).

Dec 22 – Three Rivers Stadium
WC	Buffalo	14
Dec 29 – Oakland Coliseum
Cent.	Pittsburgh	32
AFC
Cent.	Pittsburgh	24
Dec 21 – Oakland Coliseum
West	Oakland	13
AFC Championship
East	Miami	26
Jan 12 – Tulane Stadium
West	Oakland	28
Divisional playoffs
AFC	Pittsburgh	16
Dec 22 – Los Angeles Memorial Coliseum
NFC	Minnesota	6
Super Bowl IX
WC	Washington	10
Dec 29 – Metropolitan Stadium
West	Los Angeles	19
NFC
West	Los Angeles	10
Dec 21 – Metropolitan Stadium
Cent.	Minnesota	14
NFC Championship
East	St. Louis	14
Cent.	Minnesota	30

== Schedule ==
In the United States, CBS televised the NFC playoff games, while NBC broadcast the AFC games and Super Bowl IX.

Round	Away team	Score	Home team	Date	Kickoff (ET / UTC−5)	TV
Divisional round	St. Louis Cardinals	14–30	Minnesota Vikings	December 21, 1974	1:00 p.m.	CBS
Divisional round	Miami Dolphins	26–28	Oakland Raiders	December 21, 1974	4:00 p.m.	NBC
Divisional round	Buffalo Bills	14–32	Pittsburgh Steelers	December 22, 1974	1:00 p.m.	NBC
Divisional round	Washington Redskins	10–19	Los Angeles Rams	December 22, 1974	4:00 p.m.	CBS
Conference championships	Los Angeles Rams	10–14	Minnesota Vikings	December 29, 1974	1:00 p.m.	CBS
Conference championships	Pittsburgh Steelers	24–13	Oakland Raiders	December 29, 1974	4:00 p.m.	NBC
Super Bowl IX Tulane Stadium New Orleans, Louisiana	Pittsburgh Steelers	16–6	Minnesota Vikings	January 12, 1975	3:00 p.m.	NBC

== Divisional round ==
=== Saturday, December 21, 1974 ===
==== NFC: Minnesota Vikings 30, St. Louis Cardinals 14 ====
St. Louis Cardinals vs. Minnesota Vikings – Game summary

Quarter	1	2	3	4	Total
Cardinals	0	7	0	7	14
Vikings	0	7	16	7	30

at Metropolitan Stadium, Bloomington, Minnesota

- Game time: 1:00 p.m. EST
- Game weather: 28 °F (−2 °C), flurries
- Game attendance: 48,150
- Referee: Chuck Heberling
- TV announcers (CBS): Brent Musburger, Irv Cross and Johnny Unitas
- Boxscore

Game information

First quarter

- No scoring plays.

Second quarter

- STL – Earl Thomas 13-yard pass from Jim Hart (Jim Bakken kick). Cardinals 7–0.
- MIN – John Gilliam 16-yard pass from Fran Tarkenton (Fred Cox kick). Tied 7–7.

Third quarter

- MIN – Fred Cox 37-yard field goal. Vikings 10–7.
- MIN – Nate Wright 20-yard fumble return (Fred Cox kick). Vikings 17–7.
- MIN – John Gilliam 38-yard pass from Fran Tarkenton (kick failed). Vikings 23–7.

Fourth quarter

- MIN – Chuck Foreman 4-yard run (Fred Cox kick). Vikings 30–7.
- STL – Terry Metcalf 11-yard run (Jim Bakken kick). Vikings 30–14.

Top passers

- STL – Jim Hart – 18/40, 200 yards, TD, INT
- MIN – Fran Tarkenton – 13/23, 169 yards, 2 TD, 2 INT

Top rushers

- STL – Terry Metcalf – 15 rushes, 55 yards, TD
- MIN – Chuck Foreman – 23 rushes, 114 yards, TD

Top receivers

- STL – Mel Gray – 5 receptions, 77 yards
- MIN – Chuck Foreman – 5 receptions, 54 yards

Aided by the Cardinals' turnovers, the Vikings scored 16 points in less than 7 minutes in the third quarter. On their first possession of the game, St. Louis drove to the Vikings 35-yard line, but lost the ball on a failed 4th and 1 conversion attempt. St. Louis eventually got onto the scoreboard first with quarterback Jim Hart's 13-yard touchdown pass to receiver Earl Thomas, but Minnesota countered when quarterback Fran Tarkenton completed a 16-yard touchdown pass to John Gilliam. The 7–7 tie would last till the end of the half. The Cardinals had a chance to take the lead with a 56-yard drive to the Vikings 6-yard line, but Jim Bakken missed a 23-yard field goal attempt as time expired.

On the third play of the second half, Jeff Wright intercepted a pass from Hart and returned it 18 yards to set up Fred Cox's 37-yard field goal, giving his team a 10–7 lead. Exactly 60 seconds later, on the Cardinals' ensuing drive, Terry Metcalf lost a fumble while being leveled by Vikings linemen Alan Page and Carl Eller. Cornerback Nate Wright picked up the loose ball and returned it 20 yards for a touchdown that increased Minnesota's lead to 17–7. A few minutes later, Tarkenton finished off a 16-point quarter with a 38-yard touchdown pass to Gilliam. In the 4th quarter, Vikings running back Chuck Foreman, who finished the game with 114 rushing yards and 5 receptions for 54 yards, recorded a 4-yard touchdown run to give Minnesota a 30–7 lead. By the time Metcalf rushed for an 11-yard fourth-quarter touchdown, the game was already out of reach for the Cardinals.

This was the first postseason meeting between the Cardinals and Vikings.

This was the final NFL on CBS game as a play-by-play announcer for Brent Musburger, and the last for Irv Cross as an analyst until 1990. Musburger and Cross were named hosts of The NFL Today along with Phyllis George for the 1975 season.

==== AFC: Oakland Raiders 28, Miami Dolphins 26 ====
Miami Dolphins vs. Oakland Raiders – Game summary

Quarter	1	2	3	4	Total
Dolphins	7	3	6	10	26
Raiders	0	7	7	14	28

at Oakland Coliseum, Oakland, California

- Game time: 4:00 p.m. EST
- Game attendance: 53,023
- Referee: Ben Dreith
- TV announcers (NBC): Curt Gowdy, Al DeRogatis and Don Meredith

Game information

First quarter

- MIA – Nat Moore 89-yard kickoff return (Garo Yepremian kick). Dolphins 7–0.

Second quarter

- OAK – Charlie Smith 31-yard pass from Ken Stabler (George Blanda kick). Tied 7–7.
- MIA – Garo Yepremian 33-yard field goal. Dolphins 10–7.

Third quarter

- OAK – Fred Biletnikoff 13-yard pass from Ken Stabler (George Blanda kick). Raiders 14–10.
- MIA – Paul Warfield 16-yard pass from Bob Griese (kick failed). Dolphins 16–14.

Fourth quarter

- MIA – Garo Yepremian 46-yard field goal. Dolphins 19–14.
- OAK – Cliff Branch 72-yard pass from Ken Stabler (George Blanda kick). Raiders 21–19.
- MIA – Benny Malone 23-yard run (Garo Yepremian kick). Dolphins 26–21.
- OAK – Clarence Davis 8-yard pass from Ken Stabler (George Blanda kick). Raiders 28–26.

Top passers

- MIA – Bob Griese – 7/14, 101 yards, TD, INT
- OAK – Ken Stabler – 20/30, 293 yards, 4 TD, INT

Top rushers

- MIA – Larry Csonka – 24 rushes, 114 yards
- OAK – Clarence Davis – 12 rushes, 59 yards

Top receivers

- MIA – Paul Warfield – 3 receptions, 47 yards, TD
- OAK – Fred Biletnikoff – 8 receptions, 122 yards, TD

In a play that became known as the Sea of Hands, the Raiders' Clarence Davis somehow caught the winning touchdown pass with 24 seconds left in the game among "the sea of hands" of three Dolphins defenders.

The game began when rookie receiver Nat Moore returned the opening kickoff 89 yards for a Miami touchdown. Dick Anderson then intercepted a pass from Ken Stabler, but fellow safety Jake Scott was hurt on the play and would miss the rest of the game. Oakland's defense made a stand in their own territory to force a punt. Later on, the Raiders tied the game with Stabler's 31-yard touchdown pass to Charlie Smith. But with 1:01 left in the half, Miami's Garo Yepremian kicked a 33-yard field goal to put the Dolphins back in the lead.

The Raiders scored on their opening drive of the third quarter with Stabler's 13-yard touchdown pass to Fred Biletnikoff, who hauled in the ball with one arm along the right sideline and barely tap his feet in bounds through tight coverage by cornerback Tim Foley, giving them a 14–10 lead. Aided by a 29-yard pass interference penalty against the Raiders on third down, Miami struck back with Bob Griese's 16-yard touchdown pass to Paul Warfield. But Oakland lineman Bubba Smith blocked the extra point attempt, keeping the Miami lead at just 2 points, 16–14.

Early in the fourth quarter, Yepremian increased Miami's lead to 19–14 with a 46-yard field goal. Later in the period, Oakland got the ball on their own 17-yard line. Stabler started the drive with an 11-yard completion to Biletnikoff. On the next play, he threw a pass to Cliff Branch at the Dolphins' 27-yard line. Branch made a spectacular diving catch and then got back up and ran the rest of the way to the end zone for a 72-yard touchdown reception, giving the Raiders a 21–19 lead with 4:37 left in the game. With 2:08 left to play, the Dolphins took a 26–21 lead with a 68-yard, 4-play drive that ended with Benny Malone's 23-yard touchdown run, evading four tackle attempts by Raider defenders on the way to the end zone.

Following a 20-yard kickoff return by Ron Smith, the Raiders got the ball on their own 32-yard line with 2 minutes left to play and all three timeouts left. After a 6-yard completion to tight end Bob Moore and a short run, Stabler went deep to Biletnikoff, completing two consecutive passes to him for gains of 18 and 20 yards. Then after a 4-yard catch by Branch, Frank Pitts made a bobbling first down catch at the Dolphins 14-yard line. On the next play, Clarence Davis ran the ball 6 yards to the 8-yard line, where the Raiders called their final timeout. On the next play, Stabler dropped back to pass and looked for Biletnikoff in the end zone, but he was tightly covered. With Dolphins defensive end Vern Den Herder dragging him down, Stabler threw a desperate pass to the left side of the end zone into a "sea of hands", where Davis fought his way through the Dolphins defenders to make the touchdown catch.

Trailing 28–26, the Dolphins got the ball back with 24 seconds left. But on their second play of the drive, Oakland linebacker Phil Villapiano intercepted Griese's pass at the Raiders 45-yard line, allowing his team to run out the rest of the clock.

"This has to be the toughest loss I've ever suffered", said Miami coach Don Shula, "The Raiders are a great credit to professional football", he added. "They needed touchdowns to win and they got them." Moore finished his first career playoff game with 184 all-purpose yards (142 KR, 40 Rec, 2 PR). Biletnikoff caught 8 passes for 122 yards and a touchdown. Stabler completed 20 of 30 passes for 294 yards and four touchdowns, with one interception.

This was the third postseason meeting between the Dolphins and Raiders, with both teams splitting the first two meetings.

Previous playoff games
Tied 1–1 in all-time playoff games

1970

Miami Dolphins 14 @ Oakland Raiders 21

1970 AFC Divisional playoffs

1973

Oakland Raiders 10 @ Miami Dolphins 27

1973 AFC Championship Game

=== Sunday, December 22, 1974 ===
==== AFC: Pittsburgh Steelers 32, Buffalo Bills 14 ====
Buffalo Bills vs. Pittsburgh Steelers – Game summary

Quarter	1	2	3	4	Total
Bills	7	0	7	0	14
Steelers	3	26	0	3	32

at Three Rivers Stadium, Pittsburgh, Pennsylvania

- Game time: 1:00 p.m. EST
- Game attendance: 49,841
- Referee: Norm Schachter
- TV announcers (NBC): Jim Simpson and John Brodie
- Boxscore

Game information

First quarter

- PIT – Roy Gerela 21-yard field goal. Steelers 3–0.
- BUF – Paul Seymour 22-yard pass from Joe Ferguson (John Leypoldt kick). Bills 7–3.

Second quarter

- PIT – Rocky Bleier 27-yard pass from Terry Bradshaw. Steelers 9–7.
- PIT – Franco Harris 1-yard run (Roy Gerela kick). Steelers 16–7.
- PIT – Franco Harris 4-yard run. Steelers 22–7.
- PIT – Franco Harris 1-yard run (Roy Gerela kick). Steelers 29–7.

Third quarter

- BUF – O. J. Simpson 3-yard pass from Joe Ferguson (John Leypoldt kick). Steelers 29–14.

Fourth quarter

- PIT – Roy Gerela 22-yard field goal. Steelers 32–14.

Top passers

- BUF – Joe Ferguson – 11/26, 164 yards, 2 TD
- PIT – Terry Bradshaw – 12/19, 203 yards, TD

Top rushers

- BUF – O. J. Simpson – 15 rushes, 49 yards
- PIT – Franco Harris – 24 rushes, 74 yards, 3 TD

Top receivers

- BUF – J.D. Hill – 4 receptions, 59 yards
- PIT – Lynn Swann – 3 receptions, 60 yards

Running back Franco Harris led the Steelers to the victory by scoring 3 touchdowns in the second quarter. Pittsburgh outgained the Bills in total yards, 438–264, and first downs, 29–15.

Pittsburgh scored on their first possession with Roy Gerela's 21-yard field goal, but later on, a poor punt from Bobby Walden gave the Bills a first down on their own 44, where they proceeded to drive 56 yards to a 7–3 lead on Joe Ferguson's 27-yard touchdown pass to tight end Paul Seymour.

The Steelers took over the game in the second quarter, scoring 26 unanswered points with an NFL playoff single quarter record 4 touchdowns. Early in the period, Pittsburgh quarterback Terry Bradshaw rushed for 8 yards on 3rd and 7 and later picked another 12 yards on a scramble before finishing the drive with a 27-yard scoring pass to running back Rocky Bleier, giving the team a 9–7 lead after Gerela's extra point was blocked. Following a Bills punt, the team increased their lead to 16–7 with a 66-yard drive that concluded with a 1-yard touchdown run by Harris. Then Buffalo running back Jim Braxton lost a fumble on a combined tackle by Mel Blount and Mike Wagner, which linebacker Jack Ham recovered for Pittsburgh on their 42. Bradshaw subsequently completed a 19-yard pass to Bleier and 35-yard pass to Lynn Swann as the team drove to a 22–7 lead (due to another blocked extra point) on Harris' 4-yard score. With 16 seconds left before halftime, Harris scored his 3rd rushing touchdown to cap a 56-yard drive, upping his team's lead to 29–7.

Buffalo cut the score to 29–14 in the third quarter with Ferguson's 3-yard touchdown pass to running back O. J. Simpson, but Gerela's 22-yard field goal in the final period would be the only other score of the game.

In the only playoff game of his 11-season Hall of Fame career, Simpson was held to 49 rushing yards, 3 receptions for 37 yards, and a touchdown. Ferguson threw for 164 yards, 2 touchdowns, and no interceptions, but completed just 11 of 26 passes. Bradshaw completed 12 of 19 passes for 201 yards and a touchdown, while also rushing for 48 yards on five carries.

This was the first postseason meeting between the Bills and Steelers.

==== NFC: Los Angeles Rams 19, Washington Redskins 10 ====
Washington Redskins vs. Los Angeles Rams – Game summary

Quarter	1	2	3	4	Total
Redskins	3	7	0	0	10
Rams	7	0	3	9	19

at Los Angeles Memorial Coliseum, Los Angeles

- Game time: 4:00 p.m. EST
- Game weather: 61 °F (16 °C), sunny, 25 mph (40 km/h) wind
- Game attendance: 77,925
- Referee: Pat Haggerty
- TV announcers (CBS): Pat Summerall, Tom Brookshier and Bart Starr

Game information

First quarter

- LA – Bob Klein 10-yard pass from James Harris (David Ray kick). Rams 7–0.
- WAS – Mike Bragg 35-yard field goal. Rams 7–3.

Second quarter

- WAS – Moses Denson 1-yard run (Mike Bragg kick). Redskins 10–7.

Third quarter

- LA – David Ray 37-yard field goal. Tied 10–10.

Fourth quarter

- LA – David Ray 26-yard field goal. Rams 13–10.
- LA – Isiah Robertson 59-yard interception return (pass failed). Rams 19–10.

Top passers

- WAS – Billy Kilmer – 7/18, 99 yards
- LA – James Harris – 8/24, 95 yards, TD, 2 INT

Top rushers

- WAS – Larry Brown – 18 rushes, 39 yards
- LA – Lawrence McCutcheon – 26 rushes, 71 yards

Top receivers

- WAS – Charley Taylor – 4 receptions, 79 yards
- LA – Harold Jackson – 2 receptions, 35 yards

Linebacker Isiah Robertson returned an interception 59 yards in the fourth quarter, the last of six Washington turnovers, to clinch the Rams victory in a brutal defensive battle in which both teams combined for just 444 total yards. The two teams had met on the same field thirteen days earlier on Monday night, won by Washington 23–17, which was the sole home loss of the season for the Rams.

Los Angeles scored on the opening drive, moving the ball 72 yards in eight plays, with quarterback James Harris' two completions to Harold Jackson for 35 total yards setting up his 10-yard touchdown pass to tight end Bob Klein. The Redskins then scored ten unanswered points before halftime. Billy Kilmer's 41-yard completion to Charley Taylor got the team moving on the way to a 35-yard Mike Bragg field goal, making the score 7–3. In the second quarter, the Rams forced and recovered a fumble from Kilmer on the Washington 38, but the Redskins defense made a stand to prevent the Rams from scoring. Later on, Washington cornerback Pat Fischer intercepted a pass from Harris and returned it 40 yards to the Rams 23, setting up Moses Denson's 1-yard rushing touchdown to give Washington their first lead at 10–7.

In the third quarter, Rams defensive tackle Merlin Olsen forced a fumble from running back Larry Brown that linebacker Jack Reynolds recovered on the LA 44-yard line, leading to David Ray's 37-yard field goal. Then returner Doug Cunningham lost a fumble on the ensuing kickoff, resulting Ray's 26-yard field goal to give LA a 13–10 lead. In the fourth quarter, coach George Allen replaced Kilmer with Sonny Jurgensen. With the Redskins driving for the possible tying field goal, defensive tackle Merlin Olsen pressured Jurgensen into throwing the game clinching interception to Robertson, who weaved his way back and forth across the field as he ran 59 yards to the end zone. The extra point kick failed, but Olsen then recorded two more sacks, forcing a punt and enabling LA to hold the ball until 3:23 remained in the game. On Washington's next drive, Reynolds intercepted a pass from Jurgensen to put the game away. Third-string quarterback Joe Theismann was returning punts for the Redskins at this time. This was the last game in hall of famer Jurgensen's career.

This was the second postseason meeting between the franchises; the Rams also won the 1945 NFL Championship Game, their final game as the Cleveland Rams.

Previous playoff games
Los Angeles/ Cleveland Rams leads 1–0 in all-time playoff games

1945

Washington Redskins 14 @ Cleveland Rams 15

1945 NFL Championship Game

== Conference championships ==
=== Sunday, December 29, 1974 ===
==== NFC: Minnesota Vikings 14, Los Angeles Rams 10 ====
Los Angeles Rams vs. Minnesota Vikings – Game summary

Quarter	1	2	3	4	Total
Rams	0	3	0	7	10
Vikings	0	7	0	7	14

at Metropolitan Stadium, Bloomington, Minnesota

- Game time: 1:00 p.m. EST
- Game weather: 31 °F (−1 °C), sunny
- Game attendance: 48,444
- Referee: Tommy Bell
- TV announcers (CBS): Pat Summerall, Tom Brookshier and Bart Starr
- Boxscore

Game information

First quarter

- No scoring plays.

Second quarter

- MIN – Jim Lash 29-yard pass from Fran Tarkenton (Fred Cox kick). Vikings 7–0.
- LA – David Ray 27-yard field goal. Vikings 7–3.

Third quarter

- No scoring plays.

Fourth quarter

- MIN – Dave Osborn 4-yard run (Fred Cox kick). Vikings 14–3.
- LA – Harold Jackson 44-yard pass from James Harris (David Ray kick). Vikings 14–10.

Top passers

- LA – James Harris – 13/23, 248 yards, TD, 2 INT
- MIN – Fran Tarkenton – 10/20, 123 yards, TD, INT

Top rushers

- LA – Jim Bertelsen – 14 rushes, 65 yards
- MIN – Chuck Foreman – 22 rushes, 80 yards

Top receivers

- LA – Harold Jackson – 3 receptions, 139 yards, TD
- MIN – Stu Voigt – 4 receptions, 43 yards

On an unusually balmy day for December in Minnesota, the Vikings were able to hold onto the ball for the final 5:37 of the game to preserve a 14–10 victory. After a scoreless first quarter, Minnesota quarterback Fran Tarkenton threw a 29-yard touchdown to Jim Lash. Rams kicker David Ray later added a 27-yard field goal to cut the lead to 7–3 before halftime. In the third quarter, Los Angeles advanced the ball from their own 1-yard line to the Minnesota 1-yard line. The big play on the drive was a 73-yard pass play to Harold Jackson, who was finally pushed out of bounds at the Vikings 2 by safety Jeff Wright. With the ball inside the one-yard line, Rams guard Tom Mack was controversially called for illegal procedure (replays showed Mack did not move). Moved back to the six-yard line, the Rams were forced to pass for a touchdown on third down but the pass was deflected and Vikings linebacker Wally Hilgenberg intercepted the ball in the end zone for a touchback. Minnesota then went on a 15-play drive that took almost eight minutes off the clock to score on Dave Osborn's 4-yard touchdown run. With 7:15 left to play in the game, the Rams then cut the deficit to 14–10 with Harold Jackson's 44-yard touchdown reception. Then after forcing the Vikings to punt, Los Angeles drove to the Minnesota 45-yard line. But a third down sack forced the Rams to punt again and the Vikings kept the ball to run out the clock.

This was the second postseason meeting between the Rams and Vikings. Minnesota won the only previous meeting.

Previous playoff games
Minnesota leads 1–0 in all-time playoff games

1969

Los Angeles Rams 20 @ Minnesota Vikings 23

1969 NFL Western Conf. playoff

==== AFC: Pittsburgh Steelers 24, Oakland Raiders 13 ====
Pittsburgh Steelers vs. Oakland Raiders – Game summary

Quarter	1	2	3	4	Total
Steelers	0	3	0	21	24
Raiders	3	0	7	3	13

at Oakland Coliseum, Oakland, California

- Game time: 4:00 p.m. EST
- Game attendance: 53,800
- Referee: Jim Tunney
- TV announcers (NBC): Curt Gowdy, Al DeRogatis and Don Meredith

Game information

First quarter

- OAK – George Blanda 40-yard field goal. Raiders 3–0.

Second quarter

- PIT – Roy Gerela 23-yard field goal. Tied 3–3.

Third quarter

- OAK – Cliff Branch 38-yard pass from Ken Stabler (George Blanda kick). Raiders 10–3.

Fourth quarter

- PIT – Franco Harris 8-yard run (Roy Gerela kick). Tied 10–10.
- PIT – Lynn Swann 6-yard pass from Terry Bradshaw (Roy Gerela kick). Steelers 17–10.
- OAK – George Blanda 24-yard field goal. Steelers 17–13.
- PIT – Franco Harris 21-yard run (Roy Gerela kick). Steelers 24–13.

Top passers

- PIT – Terry Bradshaw – 8/17, 95 yards, TD, INT
- OAK – Ken Stabler – 19/36, 271 yards, TD, 3 INT

Top rushers

- PIT – Franco Harris – 29 rushes, 111 yards, 2 TD
- OAK – Clarence Davis – 10 rushes, 16 yards

Top receivers

- PIT – Larry Brown – 2 receptions, 37 yards
- OAK – Cliff Branch – 9 receptions, 186 yards, TD

After trailing 10–3 at the end of the third quarter, the Steelers scored three touchdowns in the final period to earn their first championship appearance in team history.

The first half was controlled by both defenses. Oakland got a big opportunity in the first quarter when they recovered a muffed punt return by Lynn Swann on the Steelers 41-yard line, but Mel Blount's deflection of a 3rd down pass by Ken Stabler forced them to settle for a 40-yard field goal from George Blanda. Meanwhile, the Steelers got close to the Oakland end zone twice, but each time they had to settle for Roy Gerela field goal attempts. He missed his first one from 20 yards in the first quarter but kicked a 23-yard field goal in the second to tie the game at 3 going into halftime.

Steelers linebacker Jack Lambert blocked a Blanda field goal in the second quarter, however in the second half, the Raiders eventually took a 10–3 lead with Ken Stabler's 38-yard touchdown pass to Cliff Branch. But Pittsburgh tied the game again six seconds into the fourth quarter with Franco Harris' 8-yard touchdown run at the end of a 61-yard drive. Then linebacker Jack Ham intercepted a pass from Stabler (his second interception of the day) and returned it to the Raiders' 9-yard line, setting up Bradshaw's 6-yard touchdown pass to Swann. Oakland responded with a drive to the Steelers 7-yard line, featuring a 45-yard reception by Fred Biletnikoff, but on 3rd down, a blitz by Mike Wagner forced Stabler to throw the ball away, and the team to setting for a 24-yard Blanda field goal, and the Steelers still led, 17–13.

Oakland got the ball back for a chance to drive for a go-ahead touchdown, but J. T. Thomas made a clutch interception and returned the ball 37 yards to the Raiders 24. Harris then scored on a 21-yard rushing touchdown to put the game away.

Harris rushed for 111 yards and 2 scores, while Rocky Bleier added 98 rushing yards and 2 receptions for 25. Branch finished the game with 9 receptions for 186 yards and a touchdown.

This was the third postseason meeting between the Steelers and Raiders. Both teams split the previous meetings.

Previous playoff games
Tied 1–1 in all-time playoff games

1972

Oakland Raiders 7 @ Pittsburgh Steelers 13

1972 AFC Divisional playoffs

1973

Pittsburgh Steelers 14 @ Oakland Raiders 33

1973 AFC Divisional playoffs

== Super Bowl IX: Pittsburgh Steelers 16, Minnesota Vikings 6 ==
Super Bowl IX – Pittsburgh Steelers vs. Minnesota Vikings – Game summary

Quarter	1	2	3	4	Total
Steelers (AFC)	0	2	7	7	16
Vikings (NFC)	0	0	0	6	6

at Tulane Stadium, New Orleans, Louisiana

- Date: January 12, 1975
- Game attendance: 80,997
- Referee: Bernie Ulman
- TV announcers (NBC): Curt Gowdy, Al DeRogatis and Don Meredith

This was the first Super Bowl meeting between the Steelers and Vikings.

== Quotes ==
Curt Gowdy and Don Meredith of NBC Television calling the Sea of Hands at the 1974 AFC Divisional Playoffs.

Gowdy –

There he is... fading... looking, looking, looking... he's under the gun, this time, he throws... it is...

Meredith –

Oh... He caught it! He caught it! He caught it!

Gowdy –

TOUCHDOWN! UNBELIEVABLE! UNBELIEVABLE!

Bill King of KNBR calling the Sea of Hands at the 1974 AFC Divisional Playoffs. –

Back to pass goes Stabler... looking, looking, looking... he runs, he's at the 15, he throws, it is... it's TOUCHDOWN RAIDERS! TOUCHDOWN RAIDERS! I can't even see the receiver. Clarence Davis, it looks like Clarence Davis, he's being mobbed.
