= Tom Wittum =

American football player (1950–2010)

No. 13
- Position: Punter

Personal information
- Born: January 11, 1950; Berwyn, Illinois, U.S.
- Died: January 22, 2010 (aged 60); Antioch, Illinois, U.S.
- Listed height: 6 ft 1 in (1.85 m)
- Listed weight: 190 lb (86 kg)

Career information
- High school: Round Lake (IL)
- College: Northern Illinois
- NFL draft: 1972: 8th round, 200th overall pick

Career history
- San Francisco 49ers (1973–1977)

Awards and highlights
- 2× Pro Bowl (1973-1974)

Career NFL statistics
- Punts: 380
- Punt yards: 15,494
- Longest punt: 68
- Stats at Pro Football Reference

Tom Wittum (January 11, 1950 – January 22, 2010) was an American professional football player. He had a 5-year career in the National Football League (NFL) from 1973 to 1977 as a punter. He played in two Pro Bowls as a member of the San Francisco 49ers.

A native of Berwyn, Ill., Wittum grew up in nearby Round Lake. A fifth-round pick of the Chicago White Sox in 1968, Wittum opted to attend Northern Illinois University instead. He was a three-year letter-winner in football for the Huskies from 1969 to 1971, and lettered four years (1969–72) as a third baseman for the NIU baseball team. He was inducted into the NIU Hall of Fame in 1987 and was a member of the Huskies' 1972 NCAA baseball team enshrined in 2008.

Wittum graduated from Northern Illinois with 10 kicking records, including the school's career, single-season and single-game records for punts, punting yards and punting average. For his career, he averaged 40.39 yards on 228 punts for 9,210 total yards, numbers which as of January 2010 rank third, fourth and third, respectively, in the Huskie record book. As of January 2010 he still holds the top three single season totals for punts and punting yards with 78 for 3,129.

Wittum ranks eighth all-time at NIU in points by a kicker with 113 on 21 field goals and 50 PATs, all NIU records at the time. His career field-goal totals of 21 made on 37 attempts, also school records at the time, are the eighth and seventh-most in school history. He made 50 of 55 extra-point attempts from 1969 to 1971 and is eighth in the Huskie record book in those categories.

Wittum shares the Pro Bowl record for longest punt with Darren Bennett (64 yards). He also currently holds the No. 2 spot for most punts in a Pro Bowl game (9).

In 1978, Wittum retired from the NFL after a serious car accident left him with several broken bones. After retirement as a player, he was head coach of the Grayslake Central High School team in Illinois and taught in addition driver's education. He died of cancer on January 22, 2010.

== NFL career statistics ==
Legend
	Led the league
**Bold**	Career high

Year	Team	Punting									
Year	Team	GP	Punts	Yds	Net Yds	Lng	Avg	Net Avg	Blk	Ins20	TB
1973	SFO	**14**	79	3,455	2,888	62	**43.7**	**36.6**	0	-	**10**
1974	SFO	**14**	68	2,800	2,169	67	41.2	31.4	1	-	7
1975	SFO	**14**	67	2,804	2,194	64	41.9	31.3	**3**	-	6
1976	SFO	**14**	**89**	**3,634**	**3,083**	**68**	40.8	33.9	2	**16**	**10**
1977	SFO	**14**	77	2,801	2,277	54	36.4	28.5	**3**	10	4
Career		70	380	15,494	12,611	68	40.8	32.4	9	26	37
