= Forrest Blue =

American football player (1945–2011)

- Blue, c. 1975

No. 75, 50
- Position: Center

Personal information
- Born: September 7, 1945; Marfa, Texas, U.S.
- Died: July 16, 2011 (aged 65); Carmichael, California, U.S.
- Listed height: 6 ft 6 in (1.98 m)
- Listed weight: 261 lb (118 kg)

Career information
- High school: Chamberlain (Tampa, Florida)
- College: Auburn (1965–1967)
- NFL draft: 1968: 1st round, 15th overall pick

Career history
- San Francisco 49ers (1968–1974); Baltimore Colts (1975–1978)

Awards and highlights
- 3× First-team All-Pro (1971–1973); 4× Pro Bowl (1971–1974); Second-team All-SEC (1965); Alabama Sports Hall of Fame; Tampa Sports Hall of Fame

Career NFL statistics
- Games played: 148
- Games started: 82
- Fumble recoveries: 5
- Stats at Pro Football Reference

Forrest Murrell Blue Jr. (September 7, 1945 – July 16, 2011) was an American professional football center who spent eleven seasons in the National Football League (NFL) with the San Francisco 49ers from 1968 to 1974 and the Baltimore Colts from 1975 to 1978.

== Early life ==
Blue was born in Marfa, Texas on September 7, 1945. He spent his teenage years in Tampa, Florida where his family moved after his father, a United States Army captain, retired there. A 1963 graduate of George D. Chamberlain High School, he made the National Honor Society and starred on the varsity teams in football, baseball, track and basketball. He was a member of the Florida High School Athletic Association (FHSAA) Class AA football champions in 1961. He eventually was inducted into the Tampa Sports Hall of Fame in 1993 and named the sixth-best football player ever from Hillsborough County, Florida by the St. Petersburg Times in 1999.

== College career ==
Blue was a three-year letterman as a center for the Auburn Tigers from 1965 through 1967 under head coach Ralph Jordan. He played for the College All-Stars in its 34–17 defeat to the Green Bay Packers on August 2, 1968.

In May 2013, he was posthumously inducted into the Alabama Sports Hall of Fame.

== Professional career ==
Blue was selected 15th overall in the first round of the 1968 NFL draft by the San Francisco 49ers. Blue helped the team win three straight division titles, and was named an All-Pro team three times.

== Death ==
Blue died at an assisted living facility in Carmichael, California of chronic traumatic encephalopathy (CTE). He was one of at least 345 NFL players to be diagnosed after death with this disease, which is caused by repeated hits to the head.
