= Larry Jones (wide receiver) =

American football player (born 1951)

No. 21
- Position: Wide receiver

Personal information
- Born: March 4, 1951 (age 75); Lemoore, California, U.S.
- Listed height: 5 ft 10 in (1.78 m)
- Listed weight: 170 lb (77 kg)

Career information
- High school: Lemoore
- College: Truman State
- NFL draft: 1974: 15th round, 367th overall pick

Career history
- New York Giants (1974); Washington Redskins (1974–1977); San Francisco 49ers (1978)

Career NFL statistics
- Receptions: 8
- Receiving yards: 109
- Receiving touchdowns: 2
- Stats at Pro Football Reference

Lawrence Allen Jones (born March 4, 1951) is an American former professional football player who was a wide receiver in the National Football League (NFL) for the New York Giants, the Washington Redskins, and the San Francisco 49ers. He played college football for the Truman Bulldogs (then Northeast Missouri State), where he was also an All-American in track and field.

== College career ==
In 1972, Jones won the national championships in the 440 yards run. In 1974, Jones had the world's fastest time in the 440, at 45.2 seconds.

In 1985, Jones was inducted into the Truman State athletic hall of fame.

== NFL career ==
Jones was selected 367th overall in the 15th round of the 1974 NFL draft by the New York Giants. He was released by the Giants before the season started and signed by the Washington Redskins. In the 1974 season, Jones returned 100 kicks, including a 52-yard return for a touchdown.

Before the 1978 season, Washington traded Jones to the San Francisco 49ers. The 49ers released Jones after 10 games. Jones subsequently signed with the Giants.
