= 1974 San Francisco 49ers season =

American football team season

- Owner: Josephine Morabito-Fox; Jane Morabito
- General manager: Louis Spadia
- Head coach: Dick Nolan
- Home stadium: Candlestick Park

Results
- Record: 6–8
- Division place: 2nd NFC West
- Playoffs: Did not qualify
- Pro Bowlers: C Forrest Blue; CB Jimmy Johnson; P Tom Wittum

Uniform
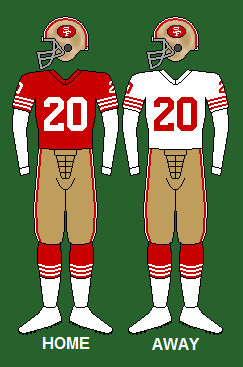

The 1974 San Francisco 49ers season was the franchise's 25th season in the National Football League, their 29th overall, and their sixth under head coach Dick Nolan.

Despite initially starting 2–0, the 49ers lost their next seven games, dropping them to a 2–7 record. They then won four of their last five games, finishing with a 6–8 record, four wins shy of the playoffs.

== Offseason ==
=== NFL draft ===
1974 San Francisco 49ers draft
Round	Pick	Player	Position	College	Notes
1	9	Wilbur Jackson	Running back	Alabama	
1	10	Bill Sandifer	Defensive tackle	UCLA	
2	35	Keith Fahnhorst *	Tackle	Minnesota	
2	49	Delvin Williams *	Running back	Kansas	
4	83	Clint Haslerig	Wide receiver	Michigan	
4	90	Sammy Johnson	Running back	North Carolina	
6	138	Mike Raines	Defensive tackle	Alabama	
7	166	Kermit Johnson	Running back	UCLA	signed with Southern California Sun (WFL)
8	191	Jim Schnietz	Guard	Missouri	
9	216	Manfred Moore	Running back	USC	
10	244	Glen Gaspard	Linebacker	Texas	
11	269	Greg Battle	Defensive back	Colorado State	
12	294	Tom Hull	Linebacker	Penn State	
13	322	Tom Owen	Quarterback	Wichita State	
14	347	Walt Williamson	Defensive end	Michigan	
15	372	Leonard Gray	Tight end	Long Beach State	did not play college football
16	400	Jack Conners	Defensive back	Oregon	
17	425	Levi Stanley	Guard	Hawaii	
Made roster * Made at least one Pro Bowl during career

== Personnel ==
=== Staff / Coaches ===
1974 San Francisco 49ers staff
Front office: Team Owner(s) – Josephine Morabito & Jane Morabito; General manager / Team President – Louis Spadia; Head coaches: Head coach = Dick Nolan; Offensive coaches: Offensive Coordinator = Dick Stanfel; Quarterbacks / Wide Receivers – Don Heinrich; Running Backs – Doug Scovil; Offensive Line / Blocking – Lew Erber	Defensive coaches: Defensive Coordinator / Defensive Line – Paul Wiggin; Linebackers – Ed Beard; Defensive Backfield / Secondary – Rich Brooks & Chet Franklin; Special teams coaches: Special Teams – Rich Brooks

=== Roster ===
1974 San Francisco 49ers roster
Quarterbacks (QB): 14 Tom Owen; 16 Norm Snead; 11 Steve Spurrier; Running backs (RB): 40 Wilbur Jackson; 48 Sammy Johnson; 45 Manfred Moore; 35 Larry Schreiber; 24 Delvin Williams; Wide receivers (WR): 46 Danny Abramowicz; 88 Terry Beasley; 18 Gene Washington; 85 Robert West; Tight ends (TE): 82 Ted Kwalick; 84 Tom Mitchell	Offensive linemen (OL): 79 Cas Banaszek T; 77 Jean Barrett G/C; 65 Randy Beisler G; 75 Forrest Blue C; 71 Keith Fahnhorst T; 66 Bob Penchion G; 69 Woody Peoples G; 76 Len Rohde T; 67 John Watson G; Defensive linemen (DL): 72 Bill Belk DT; 86 Cedrick Hardman DE; 53 Tommy Hart DE; 74 Stan Hindman DT; 56 Bob Hoskins DT; 78 Rolf Krueger DT/DE; 60 Bill Sandifer DT	Linebackers (LB): 50 Caesar Belser OLB; 59 Willie Harper OLB; 54 Tom Hull MLB; 58 Bill McKoy OLB; 57 Frank Nunley MLB; 52 Skip Vanderbundt OLB; 64 Dave Wilcox OLB; Defensive backs (DB): 43 Windlan Hall SS/FS; 47 Hugo Hollas SS; 20 Mike Holmes FS; 37 Jimmy Johnson CB; 49 Ralph McGill CB/FS; 33 John Saunders CB/S; 44 Bruce Taylor CB; Special teams (ST): 30 Bruce Gossett K; 13 Tom Wittum P	Reserve: 80 Mike Bettiga WR (IR); 63 Ed Hardy G (IR); 32 Mel Phillips S (IR); Rookies in italics

== Preseason ==
Week	Date	Opponent	Result	Record	Venue	Attendance
1	August 3	at San Diego Chargers	L 6–20	0–1	San Diego Stadium	18,870
2	August 12	at Cleveland Browns	L 20–21	0–2	Cleveland Municipal Stadium	24,008
3	August 18	Denver Broncos	L 3–10	0–3	Candlestick Park	29,908
4	August 24	at Kansas City Chiefs	L 7–26	0–4	Arrowhead Stadium	46,548
5	September 2	Oakland Raiders	L 19–20	0–5	Candlestick Park	52,538
6	September 8	Los Angeles Rams	L 7–17	0–6	Candlestick Park	46,125

== Regular season ==
=== Schedule ===
Week	Date	Opponent	Result	Record	Venue	Attendance	Recap
1	September 15	at **New Orleans Saints**	**W** 17–13	1–0	Tulane Stadium	65,071	Recap
2	September 22	at **Atlanta Falcons**	**W** 16–10	2–0	Atlanta–Fulton County Stadium	47,686	Recap
3	September 29	Cincinnati Bengals	**L** 3–21	2–1	Candlestick Park	49,895	Recap
4	October 6	St. Louis Cardinals	**L** 9–34	2–2	Candlestick Park	48,675	Recap
5	October 14	at Detroit Lions	**L** 13–17	2–3	Tiger Stadium	45,199	Recap
6	October 20	at **Los Angeles Rams**	**L** 14–37	2–4	Los Angeles Memorial Coliseum	67,319	Recap
7	October 27	Oakland Raiders	**L** 24–35	2–5	Candlestick Park	58,284	Recap
8	November 4	**Los Angeles Rams**	**L** 13–15	2–6	Candlestick Park	57,502	Recap
9	November 10	at Dallas Cowboys	**L** 14–20	2–7	Texas Stadium	50,018	Recap
10	November 17	at Chicago Bears	**W** 34–0	3–7	Soldier Field	42,686	Recap
11	November 24	**Atlanta Falcons**	**W** 27–0	4–7	Candlestick Park	45,435	Recap
12	December 1	at Cleveland Browns	**L** 0–7	4–8	Cleveland Municipal Stadium	24,559	Recap
13	December 8	Green Bay Packers	**W** 7–6	5–8	Candlestick Park	47,475	Recap
14	December 15	**New Orleans Saints**	**W** 35–21	6–8	Candlestick Park	40,418	Recap
Note: Intra-division opponents are in **bold** text.

=== Standings ===
NFC West
	W	L	T	PCT	DIV	CONF	PF	PA	STK
Los Angeles Rams	10	4	0	.714	5–1	7–3	263	181	W1
San Francisco 49ers	6	8	0	.429	4–2	6–5	226	236	W2
New Orleans Saints	5	9	0	.357	3–3	5–6	166	263	L1
Atlanta Falcons	3	11	0	.214	0–6	3–8	111	271	W1
