= 1975 Pro Bowl =

National Football League all-star game

1975 NFL Pro Bowl
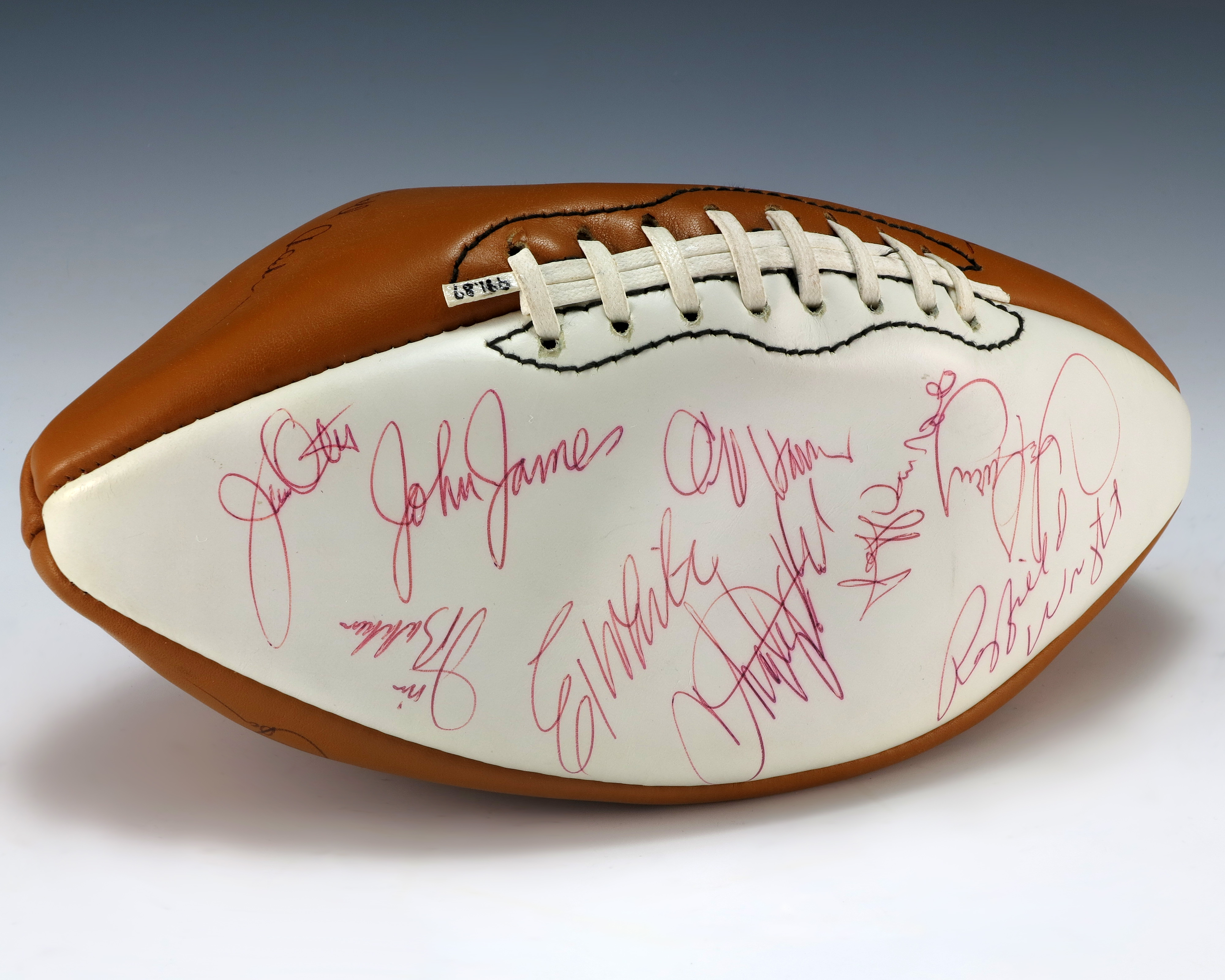
- A football signed by 1975 Pro Bowl players
NFC	AFC
17	10
Head coach: Chuck Knox (Los Angeles Rams)	Head coach: John Madden (Oakland Raiders)
	1	2	3	4	Total
NFC	0	3	0	14	17
AFC	0	0	10	0	10
- Date: January 20, 1975
- Stadium: Orange Bowl; Miami, Florida
- MVP: James Harris (Los Angeles Rams)
- Referee: Dick Jorgensen
- Attendance: 26,484

TV in the United States
- Network: ABC
- Announcers: Frank Gifford, Howard Cosell & Alex Karras

The 1975 Pro Bowl was the NFL's 25th annual all-star game which featured the outstanding performers from the 1974 season. The game was played on Monday, January 20, 1975, at the Orange Bowl in Miami, Florida. The final score was NFC 17, AFC 10. James Harris of the Los Angeles Rams was named the game's Most Valuable Player.

Attendance at the game was 26,484. John Madden of the Oakland Raiders coached the AFC while the NFC was led by the Los Angeles Rams' Chuck Knox. The referee for the game was Dick Jorgensen. It was the first of five straight Pro Bowls played on ABC's Monday Night Football package.

== AFC roster ==
=== Offense ===
Position	Starter(s)	Reserve(s)
Quarterback	14 Ken Stabler, Oakland	12 Bob Griese, Miami
Running back	36 O. J. Simpson, Buffalo	35 Greg Pruitt, Cleveland
Fullback	24 Otis Armstrong, Denver	39 Larry Csonka, Miami; 44 Franco Harris, Pittsburgh
Wide receivers	21 Cliff Branch, Oakland; 85 Isaac Curtis, Cincinnati	25 Fred Biletnikoff, Oakland; 27 Paul Warfield, Miami
Tight end	87 Riley Odoms, Denver	88 Rich Caster, N.Y. Jets
Offensive tackle	78 Art Shell, Oakland; 70 Russ Washington, San Diego	73 Norm Evans, Miami
Offensive guard	66 Larry Little, Miami; 63 Gene Upshaw, Oakland	67 Bob Kuechenberg, Miami
Center	62 Jim Langer, Miami	58 Jack Rudnay, Kansas City

=== Defense ===
Position	Starter(s)	Reserve(s)
Defensive end	68 L. C. Greenwood, Pittsburgh; 84 Bill Stanfill, Miami	65 Elvin Bethea, Houston
Defensive tackle	75 Joe Greene, Pittsburgh; 72 Jerry Sherk, Cleveland	60 Otis Sistrunk, Oakland
Outside linebacker	59 Jack Ham, Pittsburgh; 34 Andy Russell, Pittsburgh	41 Phil Villapiano, Oakland
Inside linebacker	32 Mike Curtis, Baltimore	63 Willie Lanier, Kansas City
Cornerback	20 Robert James, Buffalo; 18 Emmitt Thomas, Kansas City	22 Lemar Parrish, Cincinnati
Free safety	46 Jack Tatum, Oakland	37 Tommy Casanova, Cincinnati; 13 Jake Scott, Miami
Strong safety	40 Dick Anderson, Miami	

=== Special teams ===
Position	Starter(s)	Reserve(s)
Punter	8 Ray Guy, Oakland	
Placekicker	10 Roy Gerela, Pittsburgh	

== NFC roster ==
=== Offense ===
Position	Starter(s)	Reserve(s)
Quarterback	17 Jim Hart, St. Louis	11 James Harris, Los Angeles; 10 Fran Tarkenton, Minnesota
Running back	30 Lawrence McCutcheon, Los Angeles	35 Calvin Hill, Dallas; 21 Terry Metcalf, St. Louis
Fullback	44 Chuck Foreman, Minnesota	
Wide receivers	89 Drew Pearson, Dallas; 42 Charley Taylor, Washington	84 John Gilliam, Minnesota; 82 Mel Gray, St. Louis
Tight end	86 Charle Young, Philadelphia	80 Charlie Sanders, Detroit
Offensive tackle	70 Rayfield Wright, Dallas; 73 Ron Yary, Minnesota	71 Dan Dierdorf, St. Louis
Offensive guard	68 Gale Gillingham, Green Bay; 65 Tom Mack, Los Angeles	61 Blaine Nye, Dallas
Center	57 Jeff Van Note, Atlanta	75 Forrest Blue, San Francisco

=== Defense ===
Position	Starter(s)	Reserve(s)
Defensive end	81 Carl Eller, Minnesota; 87 Claude Humphrey, Atlanta	85 Jack Youngblood, Los Angeles
Defensive tackle	74 Merlin Olsen, Los Angeles; 88 Alan Page, Minnesota	72 Diron Talbert, Washington
Outside linebacker	50 Chris Hanburger, Washington; 56 Ted Hendricks, Green Bay	58 Isiah Robertson, Los Angeles
Inside linebacker	66 Bill Bergey, Philadelphia	55 Lee Roy Jordan, Dallas
Cornerback	28 Willie Buchanon, Green Bay; 24 Roger Wehrli, St. Louis	37 Jimmy Johnson, San Francisco
Free safety	22 Paul Krause, Minnesota	43 Cliff Harris, Dallas; 26 Dick Jauron, Detroit
Strong safety	27 Ken Houston, Washington	

=== Special teams ===
Position	Starter(s)	Reserve(s)
Punter	13 Tom Wittum, San Francisco	
Placekicker	13 Chester Marcol, Green Bay	
