= 1974 New Orleans Saints season =

NFL team season

- Owner: John W. Mecom Jr.
- Head coach: John North
- Home stadium: Tulane Stadium

Results
- Record: 5–9
- Division place: 3rd NFC West
- Playoffs: Did not qualify
- Pro Bowlers: None

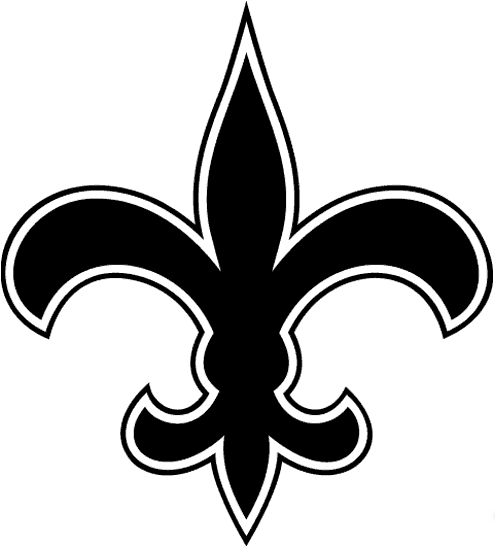
Logo of New Orleans Saints (1967-1999)

The 1974 New Orleans Saints season was the team's eighth as a member of the National Football League (NFL). This was their final season at Tulane Stadium as the Louisiana Superdome opened the following season (at the end of the 1973 season, the Saints were scheduled to move into the Superdome in August 1974, but continued construction delays pushed the timeline back one year). They matched their previous season's output of 5–9. The team failed to qualify for the playoffs for the eighth consecutive season.

Despite another losing record, the Saints defeated two of the NFC's four playoff entries, ousting the Los Angeles Rams 20–7 in week 10 and the St. Louis Cardinals 14–0 in week 13, both at home. The win over the Cardinals was the Saints’ final game at Tulane Stadium.

In between the wins vs. the Rams and Cardinals, New Orleans lost to the teams which faced off in Super Bowl IX at Tulane Stadium, the Pittsburgh Steelers and Minnesota Vikings. The 28-7 setback vs. the Steelers at home was New Orleans' last appearance on Monday Night Football until 1979.

The Saints ended an 18-game winless streak on the road when they defeated the Atlanta Falcons in week six. However, they would not win again away from New Orleans until 1976 when they defeated the Kansas City Chiefs. From 1972 through 1975, the Saints were 1–26–1 on the road.

The win at Atlanta-Fulton County Stadium allowed New Orleans to complete its first season sweep of Atlanta since the Saints and Falcons became division rivals in 1970. The Saints entered 1974 with a nine-game losing streak to their archrival, including a humiliating 62–7 rout at home in the previous season's opener. New Orleans did not sweep Atlanta again until 1983.

In a rare fluke, the Saints did not wear their black jerseys for any game in the 1974 season. They donned white uniforms at home, and when on the road, each of their opponents opted to wear their colored uniforms.

== Offseason ==
=== NFL draft ===
1974 New Orleans Saints draft
Round	Pick	Player	Position	College	Notes
1	13	Rick Middleton	Linebacker	Ohio State	
2	36	Paul Seal	Tight end	Michigan	
4	88	Rod McNeill	Running back	USC	
5	113	Joel Parker	Wide receiver	Ohio State	
5	121	Terry Schmidt	Cornerback	Ball State	
8	201	Alvin Maxson	Running back	Southern Methodist	
9	217	Phil LaPorta	Offensive tackle	Penn State	
10	235	Frosty Anderson	Wide receiver	Nebraska	
10	242	Tommy Thibodeaux	Guard	Tulane	
11	270	Kent Merritt	Wide receiver	Virginia	
12	295	Jim Buckmon	Defensive end	Pittsburgh	
13	320	Mike Truax	Linebacker	Tulane	
14	348	Kent Marshall	Defensive back	Texas Christian	
15	373	Larry Cipa	Quarterback	Michigan	
15	391	Jim Polak	Center	Purdue	
16	398	Don Coleman	Linebacker	Michigan	
17	426	Marvin Williams	Wide receiver	Western Illinois	
Made roster

== Personnel ==
=== Staff ===
1974 New Orleans Saints staff
Front office: President – John W. Mecom Jr.; Assistant to the President – Fred Williams; Executive Vice President – Richard F. Gordon, Jr.; Vice President of Administration – Harry Hulmes; Business Manager and Treasurer – Eddie Jones; Director of Pro Scouting – Ernie Hefferle; Director of Player Personnel – Bob Whitman; Head coaches: Head Coach – John North; Offensive coaches: Quarterbacks – Lamar McHan; Offensive Backs – Bob Ledbetter; Receivers – Jim Phillips; Offensive Line – Wimp Hewgley	Defensive coaches: Defensive Line – Bob Cummings; Linebackers – Doug Shively; Defensive Backfield – Bud Whitehead

=== Roster ===
1974 New Orleans Saints roster
Quarterbacks (QB): 13 Larry Cipa; 8 Archie Manning; 12 Bobby Scott; Running backs (RB): 38 Bill Butler; 47 Jack DeGrenier; 28 Alvin Maxson; 27 Rod McNeill; 34 Jess Phillips; 22 Howard Stevens; Wide receivers (WR): 86 Dave Davis; 80 Sam Havrilak; 41 Bob Newland; 42 Joel Parker; 49 Bob Wicks; Tight ends (TE): 87 Henry Childs; 85 John Beasley; 84 Paul Seal	Offensive linemen (OL): 51 John Didion C; 50 Jake Kupp G; 67 Phil LaPorta T; 73 John Mooring T; 76 Don Morrison T; 66 Rocky Rasley G; 65 Dave Thompson T; 79 Emanuel Zanders G; Defensive linemen (DL): 63 Steve Baumgartner DT/DE; 88 Andy Dorris DE; 74 Derland Moore DT; 78 Billy Newsome DE; 72 Joe Owens DE; 82 Bob Pollard DE/DT; 75 Elex Price DT	Linebackers (LB): 55 Don Coleman OLB; 59 Wayne Colman OLB; 58 Joe Federspiel MLB; 53 Rick Kingrea MLB; 57 Jim Merlo OLB; 54 Rick Middleton OLB; Defensive backs (DB): 21 Greg Boyd SS; 44 Chris Farasopoulos FS; 24 Johnny Fuller SS; 30 Ernie Jackson CB; 11 Bivian Lee CB; 37 Tom Myers FS; 29 Mo Spencer CB; Special teams (ST): 16 Tom Blanchard P; 19 Bill McClard K	Reserve: 89 Frosty Anderson WR (IR); 83 Len Garrett TE (IR); 39 Odell Lawson RB (IR); 48 Curtis Martin TE (IR); 25 Jerry Moore S (IR); 40 Terry Schmidt CB (IR); 17 Speedy Thomas WR (IR); Rookies in italics

== Schedule ==
Week	Date	Opponent	Result	Record	Venue	Attendance	Recap
1	September 15	**San Francisco 49ers**	**L** 13–17	0–1	Tulane Stadium	65,071	Recap
2	September 22	at Los Angeles Rams	**L** 0–24	0–2	Los Angeles Memorial Coliseum	64,178	Recap
3	September 29	**Atlanta Falcons**	**W** 14–13	1–2	Tulane Stadium	62,273	Recap
4	October 6	at Chicago Bears	**L** 10–24	1–3	Soldier Field	45,818	Recap
5	October 13	at Denver Broncos	**L** 17–33	1–4	Mile High Stadium	50,881	Recap
6	October 20	at **Atlanta Falcons**	**W** 13–3	2–4	Atlanta Stadium	47,217	Recap
7	October 27	Philadelphia Eagles	**W** 14–10	3–4	Tulane Stadium	64,257	Recap
8	November 3	at Detroit Lions	**L** 14–19	3–5	Tiger Stadium	43,256	Recap
9	November 10	Miami Dolphins	**L** 0–21	3–6	Tulane Stadium	74,289	Recap
10	November 17	**Los Angeles Rams**	**W** 20–7	4–6	Tulane Stadium	57,287	Recap
11	November 25	Pittsburgh Steelers	**L** 7–28	4–7	Tulane Stadium	71,907	Recap
12	December 1	at Minnesota Vikings	**L** 9–29	4–8	Metropolitan Stadium	44,202	Recap
13	December 8	St. Louis Cardinals	**W** 14–0	5–8	Tulane Stadium	57,152	Recap
14	December 15	at **San Francisco 49ers**	**L** 21–35	5–9	Candlestick Park	40,418	Recap
Note: Intra-division opponents are in **bold** text.

== Standings ==
NFC West
	W	L	T	PCT	DIV	CONF	PF	PA	STK
Los Angeles Rams	10	4	0	.714	5–1	7–3	263	181	W1
San Francisco 49ers	6	8	0	.429	4–2	6–5	226	236	W2
New Orleans Saints	5	9	0	.357	3–3	5–6	166	263	L1
Atlanta Falcons	3	11	0	.214	0–6	3–8	111	271	W1
