= Charlie Evans (American football) =

American football player (1948–2024)

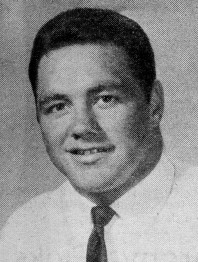
- Evans in 1967

No. 31
- Position: Running back

Personal information
- Born: January 10, 1948; Gardena, California, U.S.
- Died: November 5, 2024 (aged 76); Longview, Texas, U.S.
- Listed height: 6 ft 1 in (1.85 m)
- Listed weight: 220 lb (100 kg)

Career information
- High school: Gardena
- College: Utah; Southern California
- NFL draft: 1971: 14th round, 356th overall pick

Career history
- New York Giants (1971–1973); Washington Redskins (1974)

Career NFL statistics
- Rushing att-yards: 205-644
- Receptions-yards: 54-470
- Touchdowns: 13
- Stats at Pro Football Reference

Jack Charles Evans (January 10, 1948 – November 5, 2024) was an American professional football player who was a running back in the National Football League (NFL). He played for the New York Giants and Washington Redskins.

== Biography ==
Evans was born in Gardena, California, and graduated from Gardena High School. He played college football at the University of Utah and the University of Southern California.

He was drafted by the New York Giants in the 14th round (356th overall) of the 1971 NFL draft, and played four seasons in the NFL.

Evans died at his home in Longview, Texas on November 5, 2024, at the age of 76. He leaves behind a daughter, son, and three grandchildren.

His brain was donated to Boston University CTE Center to assist in further medical research of CTE.

Shortly after his death, his 3 touchdown game against the Chargers in 1971 re-gained notoriety as Giants rookie Cam Skattebo scored 3 rushing touchdowns in a game (while beating the Eagles 34–17 upset win) on October 9, 2025, becoming the only Giants rookies to do so.
