= David Ray (American football) =

American gridiron football player (born 1944)

No. 27
- Position: Placekicker

Personal information
- Born: September 19, 1944 (age 82); Phenix City, Alabama, U.S.
- Listed height: 6 ft 2 in (1.88 m)
- Listed weight: 195 lb (88 kg)

Career information
- High school: Phenix Central (AL)
- College: Alabama
- NFL draft: 1966: 16th round, 243rd overall pick

Career history
- Montreal Alouettes (1968); Los Angeles Rams (1969–1974)

Awards and highlights
- NFL scoring leader (1973); PFW Golden Toe Award (1973); 2× National champion (1964, 1965)

Career NFL statistics
- Field goals: 110 / 178
- Field goal %: 61.8
- Extra points: 175 / 167
- Stats at Pro Football Reference

David Eugene Ray Jr. (born September 19, 1944) is an American former professional football player who was a placekicker in the National Football League (NFL) and Canadian Football League (CFL). He played college football for the Alabama Crimson Tide as a kicker and wide receiver, and was an All-American kicker in 1964.

== Professional career ==
Ray was selected in the 16th round (243rd overall) of the 1966 NFL draft. He then played for the Montreal Alouettes in 1968, where he made 11 of 18 field goal attempts. Ray joined the Los Angeles Rams in 1969 and played for the team for six seasons, connecting on 110 field goals in 178 attempts.
