= 1974 Los Angeles Rams season =

NFL team 37th season

- Owner: Carroll Rosenbloom
- Head coach: Chuck Knox
- Home stadium: Los Angeles Memorial Coliseum

Results
- Record: 10–4
- Division place: 1st NFC West
- Playoffs: Won Divisional Playoffs (vs. Redskins) 19–10; Lost NFC Championship (at Vikings) 10–14

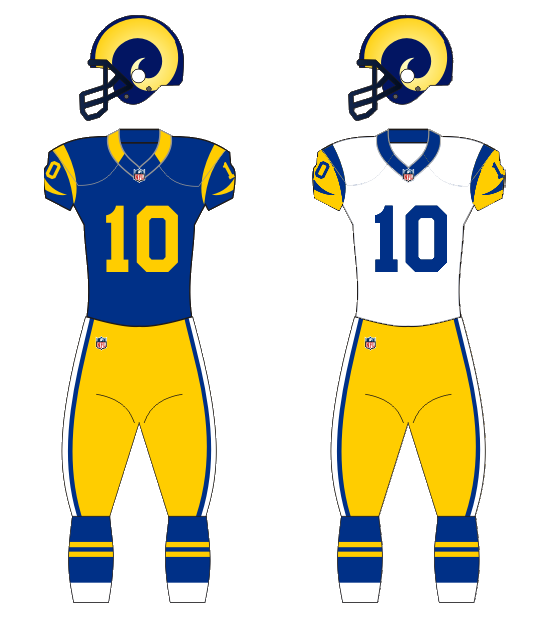
Los Angeles/St. Louis Rams uniforms from 1973 to 1999

The 1974 Los Angeles Rams season was the team's 37th year with the National Football League and the 29th season in Los Angeles. The Rams looked to improve on their 12–2 season from 1973. While not improving on their record, they successfully defended their NFC West division title with a 10–4 record, the second-best in the NFC.

In the playoffs, Los Angeles hosted the Washington Redskins in a rematch of week 13's game, which Washington won 23–17 on Monday night, in the Rams' only home loss of the season. In the postseason game, L.A. forced six turnovers to win 19–10 and advance to their first NFC Championship Game, but committed five turnovers and lost 14–10 on the road to the Minnesota Vikings.

During week 5 of the regular season, the Rams were upset 17–6 in Milwaukee by the Green Bay Packers; veteran quarterback John Hadl was benched in the second half after throwing three interceptions, replaced by James Harris. The next game, a 37–14 home win over rival San Francisco, was the first NFL start for Harris, and Hadl was traded two days later to Green Bay for five future draft picks.

The win over Washington in the playoffs was the Rams' first postseason victory in 23 years, when they won the NFL title. (Los Angeles won the third-place Playoff Bowl twice (after the 1967 and 1969 seasons); these consolation games are now considered exhibition contests.)

== Offseason ==
=== NFL draft ===
= Made roster	= Pro Bowler	= Hall of Famer

1974 Los Angeles Rams draft selections
Round	Pick	Player	Position	College	Notes
1	11	John Cappelletti	RB	Penn State	
2	50	Bill Simpson	S	Michigan State	
3	76	Al Oliver	OT	UCLA	
4	99	Norris Weese	QB	Mississippi	Would later make Denver Broncos 1976 roster
4	102	Frank Johnson	OT	UC Riverside	
7	158	John Harvey	RB	Arlington	
9	221	Derek Williams	DB	UC Riverside	
11	284	Rick Hayes	T	Washington	
12	310	Roger Freberg	G	UCLA	
13	336	Pete Solverson	T	Drake	
14	362	Ananias Carson	WR	Langston	
15	388	Bob Thomas	K	Notre Dame	Would later make Chicago Bears 1975 roster
16	414	Dave Ottmar	P	Stanford	
17	440	Willie Townsend	WR	Notre Dame	

== Personnel ==
=== Staff / Coaches ===
1974 Los Angeles Rams staff
Front Office: Owner – Carroll Rosenbloom; President / General Manager – Don Klosterman; Coaching Staff: Head coach - Chuck Knox; Offensive Coaches: Offensive Coordinator - Ken Meyer; Offensive Backfield Coach - Elijah Pitts; Offensive Line - Ray Prochaska; Receivers Coach - Leeman Bennett	Defensive Coaches: Defensive Coordinator - Ray Malavasi; Linebackers - Tom Catlin; Special Teams Coaches: None - N/A; Strength and Conditioning: None - N/A; Other Assistant Coaches: Training Assistant - Garrett Giemont; Advance Scott - Jack Faulkner

=== Roster ===
1974 Los Angeles Rams roster
Quarterbacks (QB): 12 James Harris; 16 Ron Jaworski; 11 Don Milan; Running backs (RB): 35 Tony Baker; 45 Jim Bertelsen; 32 Cullen Bryant; 22 John Cappelletti; 34 Les Josephson; 30 Lawrence McCutcheon; 33 Rob Scribner; Wide receivers (WR): 29 Harold Jackson; 24 Willie McGee; 19 Lance Rentzel; 84 Jack Snow; Tight ends (TE): 88 Pat Curran; 80 Bob Klein; 83 Terry Nelson	Offensive linemen (OL): 73 Charley Cowan T; 55 Bill Curry C; 50 Ken Iman C; 65 Tom Mack G; 61 Rich Saul C/G; 71 Joe Scibelli G; 78 Tim Stokes T; 75 John Williams T; Defensive linemen (DL): 90 Larry Brooks DT; 89 Fred Dryer DE; 76 Cody Jones DT/DE; 67 Bill Nelson DT; 74 Merlin Olsen DT; 72 Phil Olsen DE; 85 Jack Youngblood DE	Linebackers (LB): 36 Ken Geddes OLB; 57 Jim Peterson OLB; 64 Jack Reynolds MLB; 58 Isiah Robertson OLB; 66 Bob Stein OLB; 59 Jim Youngblood MLB; Defensive backs (DB): 44 Al Clark CB; 42 Dave Elmendorf SS; 41 Eddie McMillan CB; 21 Tony Plummer SS; 20 Steve Preece FS; 48 Bill Simpson FS; 47 Charlie Stukes CB; Special teams (ST): 11 Mike Burke P; 27 David Ray K	Reserve: 63 Rich Baska LB (IR); 37 Bill Drake S (IR); 77 Greg Horton G/T (IR); 52 Rick Kay LB (IR); 59 Al Kelso C (IR); Rookies in italics

== Regular season ==
=== Schedule ===
Week	Date	Opponent	Result	Record	Venue	Attendance	Recap
1	September 15	at Denver Broncos	**W** 17–10	1–0	Mile High Stadium	51,121	Recap
2	September 22	**New Orleans Saints**	**W** 24–0	2–0	Los Angeles Memorial Coliseum	64,178	Recap
3	September 29	at New England Patriots	**L** 14–20	2–1	Schaefer Stadium	61,279	Recap
4	October 6	Detroit Lions	**W** 16–13	3–1	Los Angeles Memorial Coliseum	64,987	Recap
5	October 13	at Green Bay Packers	**L** 6–17	3–2	Milwaukee County Stadium	47,499	Recap
6	October 20	**San Francisco 49ers**	**W** 37–14	4–2	Los Angeles Memorial Coliseum	67,319	Recap
7	October 27	at New York Jets	**W** 20–13	5–2	Shea Stadium	56,110	Recap
8	November 4	at **San Francisco 49ers**	**W** 15–13	6–2	Candlestick Park	57,502	Recap
9	November 10	**Atlanta Falcons**	**W** 21–0	7–2	Los Angeles Memorial Coliseum	70,056	Recap
10	November 17	at **New Orleans Saints**	**L** 7–20	7–3	Tulane Stadium	57,287	Recap
11	November 24	Minnesota Vikings	**W** 20–17	8–3	Los Angeles Memorial Coliseum	90,266	Recap
12	December 1	at **Atlanta Falcons**	**W** 30–7	9–3	Atlanta Stadium	18,648	Recap
13	December 9	Washington Redskins	**L** 17–23	9–4	Los Angeles Memorial Coliseum	87,313	Recap
14	December 15	Buffalo Bills	**W** 19–14	10–4	Los Angeles Memorial Coliseum	84,324	Recap
Note: Intra-division opponents are in **bold** text.

=== Playoffs ===
Round	Date	Opponent	Result	Venue	Attendance	Recap
Divisional	December 22	Washington Redskins	**W** 19–10	Los Angeles Memorial Coliseum	80,118	Recap
NFC Championship	December 29	at Minnesota Vikings	**L** 10–14	Metropolitan Stadium	47,404	Recap

=== Standings ===
NFC West
	W	L	T	PCT	DIV	CONF	PF	PA	STK
Los Angeles Rams	10	4	0	.714	5–1	7–3	263	181	W1
San Francisco 49ers	6	8	0	.429	4–2	6–5	226	236	W2
New Orleans Saints	5	9	0	.357	3–3	5–6	166	263	L1
Atlanta Falcons	3	11	0	.214	0–6	3–8	111	271	W1

== Awards and records ==
- Merlin Olsen, Bert Bell Award
