= Moses Denson =

American football player (born 1944)

No. 44
- Position: Running back

Personal information
- Born: July 6, 1944 (age 82); Vredenburgh, Alabama, U.S.
- Listed height: 6 ft 1 in (1.85 m)
- Listed weight: 215 lb (98 kg)

Career information
- High school: South (Akron, Ohio)
- College: Maryland-Eastern Shore
- NFL draft: 1972: 8th round, 203rd overall pick

Career history
- 1970–1972: Montreal Alouettes
- 1974–1975: Washington Redskins

Awards and highlights
- Grey Cup champion (1970); 2× CFL East All-Star (1970, 1972)
- Stats at Pro Football Reference

Moses Denson (born July 6, 1944) is an American former professional football running back in the National Football League (NFL) for the Washington Redskins. He played college football at the University of Maryland Eastern Shore.

Denson played three seasons for the Montreal Alouettes of the Canadian Football League (CFL). He was a CFL all-star twice, and won the Grey Cup in 1970, where his broken-play pass for a touchdown to Ted Alflen in the first quarter was the game's turning point.
