= Mike Bragg =

American football player (born 1946)

No. 4
- Position: Punter

Personal information
- Born: September 26, 1946 (age 80); Richmond, Virginia, U.S
- Listed height: 5 ft 11 in (1.80 m)
- Listed weight: 186 lb (84 kg)

Career information
- High school: Justice (Falls Church, Virginia)
- College: Richmond
- NFL draft: 1968: 5th round, 117th overall pick

Career history
- Washington Redskins (1968–1979); Baltimore Colts (1980)

Awards and highlights
- 70 Greatest Redskins

Career NFL statistics
- Punts: 978
- Punt yards: 38,949
- Longest punt: 74
- Stats at Pro Football Reference

Michael Edward Bragg (born September 26, 1946) is an American former professional football player who was a punter in the National Football League (NFL) for the Washington Redskins and Baltimore Colts. He played college football for the Richmond Spiders and was selected 117th overall in the fifth round of the 1968 NFL/AFL draft.

Bragg played 12 of his 13 years with the Washington Redskins, from 1968-1979, and as of January 2025 continues to be the franchise leader in number of punts, with 896.

Bragg was the last active NFL player to play for Vince Lombardi, who coached the Redskins in 1969 before succumbing to colon cancer in 1970.
