= 1974 NFL season =

American football season

Regular season
- Duration: September 15 – December 15, 1974

Playoffs
- Start date: December 21, 1974
- AFC Champions: Pittsburgh Steelers
- NFC Champions: Minnesota Vikings

Super Bowl IX
- Date: January 12, 1975
- Site: Tulane Stadium, New Orleans, Louisiana
- Champions: Pittsburgh Steelers

Pro Bowl
- Date: January 20, 1975
- Site: Orange Bowl, Miami, Florida

AFC teams: West, Central, East
NFC teams: West, Central, East

The 1974 NFL season was the 55th regular season of the National Football League. The season ended with Super Bowl IX when the Pittsburgh Steelers defeated the Minnesota Vikings 16-6. Players held a strike from July 1 until August 10, prior to the regular season beginning; only one preseason game (that year's College All-Star Game) was canceled, and the preseason contests were held with all-rookie rosters.

The 1974 season was the first played under a major rules reform intended to promote offensive football, including a reduction of the penalty for offensive holding from 15 yards to 10, elimination of unlimited "chucking" of pass receivers and banning low blocks against them, moving the goalposts to the end line to incentivize more aggressive play-calling, and implementing sudden death overtime to reduce tie games.

== Draft ==
The 1974 NFL draft was held from January 29 to 30, 1974, at New York City's Americana Hotel. With the first pick, the Dallas Cowboys selected defensive end Ed "Too Tall" Jones from the Tennessee State University.

== New officials ==
There were two new referees in 1974, Cal Lepore and Gordon McCarter. Lepore replaced the retired John McDonough, the referee for Super Bowl IV and the NFL's longest game, the 1971 Christmas Day playoff between the Dolphins and Chiefs which lasted 82 minutes, 40 seconds. McCarter succeeded Jack Reader, who left the field to become chief lieutenant to NFL Director of Officiating Art McNally at league headquarters in New York.

== Rules reform of 1974 ==
The NFL faced growing criticism in the early 1970s that its game had become too conservative — run-centric and field position-oriented. The league's competition committee had worked for several years attempting to craft rules changes that would make long touchdown drives more achievable and reducing the number of possessions ending with long field goal attempts.

Unfortunately, various piecemeal attempts to implement rules changes to open up the game had devolved into arguments and been shot down at the annual meetings of team owners. Ahead of the 1974 a new approach was taken by the competition committee, however, and a broad suite of major rules reforms were presented to the other owners as a package on a take-it-or-leave it basis. With changes implemented by the rival World Football League (WFL) helping to spur action lest the NFL be left behind, this set of rules changes was approved:

=== Timing ===
- In order to reduce the number of tie games, a single 15 minute sudden death overtime period was added to all preseason (through 2019, there was no exhibition season in the next and abolished hereafter) and regular season games (up to 2011; since 2017, 10). If no team scored during this period, the game would result in a tie. Playoff games were to continue to play multiple overtime periods until a result was achieved.

=== Kicking ===
- Goal posts: moved to the end line from the goal line, where they had been located since the NFL's rule changes of 1933. This was to reduce the number of games being decided on field goals, and to increase their difficulty, as well as to reduce the risk of player injuries on running plays at the goal line.
- Missed field goals: the defensive team takes possession at the line of scrimmage or the twenty-yard line (touchback), whichever is farther from their goal line. A missed field goal attempt fielded in-bounds and run back into the field of play was to be treated as any normal scrimmage kick.
- Kickoffs: moved to the 35-yard line (from the 40-yard line) to reduce touchbacks and promote more excitement with kickoff returns.
- Punt returns: all players of a punting team were to be forced to stay onside until after the ball was kicked except the two players at the end of each side of the line ("gunners") — but only one of these was allowed to actually leave. This was intended to make it easier for the receiving team to block for a punt return, reducing the net field advantage gained by punting the ball away and putting the receiving team in a more advantageous position to score.

=== Blocking and receiving ===
- An eligible pass receiver could only be contacted ("chucked") once by defenders after the receiver had gone three yards beyond the line of scrimmage.
- When the defensive team commits an illegal use of hands, arms, or body foul from behind the line of scrimmage, the penalty will be assessed from the previous spot instead of the spot of the foul.
- The penalties for offensive holding, illegal use of hands, and tripping were reduced from fifteen to ten yards.
- No receiver lining up two or more yards outside the tackles could henceforth be blocked below the waist ("axed").
- Wide receivers blocking back towards the ball ("crack-back blocking") within three yards from the line of scrimmage could no longer block below the waist.

Although the package of rules changes were approved by ownership for the 1974 season, substantial dissent remained, with at least eight owners expressing disapproval off the record. Chief among these was Joe Robbie, owner of the world champion Miami Dolphins, who objected that the changes were "frankly intended to tip the scales toward passing and against running." Robbie asserted that his team had "proved that football fans like to watch a good running game" and that "you aren't making it exciting when you put in a new rule making it harder to block sweeps."

Those favoring passing were more positive, with St. Louis Cardinals head coach Don Coryell enthusiastically declaring, "The new rules definitely encourage offense."

== Deaths ==
- July 28 - Don McCafferty, age 53. Head coach for the Baltimore Colts in the win over the Dallas Cowboys in Super Bowl V

== Roster changes ==
In addition to its sweeping changes to playing rules, the NFL eliminated the "future list" ("taxi squad") of players a team could sign without placing them on an active roster. The future list had been formalized by the league in 1965 and had informally existed for over a decade before that. The concept returned in 1977, renamed the practice squad.

== Division races ==
From 1970 to 2001, there were three divisions (Eastern, Central and Western) in each conference. The winners of each division, and a fourth "wild card" team based on the best non-division winner, qualified for the playoffs. The tiebreaker rules were changed to start with head-to-head competition, followed by division records, records against common opponents, and records in conference play.

=== National Football Conference ===
Week	Eastern		Central		Western		Wild Card	
1	St. Louis, Washington, Dallas	1–0–0	Chicago, Minnesota	1–0–0	Los Angeles, San Fran.	1–0–0	4 teams	1–0–0
2	St. Louis	2–0–0	Minnesota	2–0–0	Los Angeles, San Fran.	2–0–0	Los Angeles, San Fran.	2–0–0
3	St. Louis	3–0–0	Minnesota	3–0–0	Los Angeles, San Fran.	2–1–0	4 teams	2–1–0
4	St. Louis	4–0–0	Minnesota	4–0–0	Los Angeles	3–1–0	Philadelphia	3–1–0
5	St. Louis	5–0–0	Minnesota	5–0–0	Los Angeles	3–2–0	Philadelphia	4–1–0
6	St. Louis	6–0–0	Minnesota	5–1–0	Los Angeles	4–2–0	Philadelphia	4–2–0
7	St. Louis	7–0–0	Minnesota	5–2–0	Los Angeles	5–2–0	Washington	4–3–0
8	St. Louis	7–1–0	Minnesota	6–2–0	Los Angeles	6–2–0	Washington	5–3–0
9	St. Louis	7–2–0	Minnesota	7–2–0	Los Angeles	7–2–0	Washington	6–3–0
10	St. Louis	8–2–0	Minnesota	7–3–0	Los Angeles	7–3–0	Washington	7–3–0
11	St. Louis	9–2–0	Minnesota	7–4–0	Los Angeles	8–3–0	Washington	8–3–0
12	St. Louis	9–3–0	Minnesota	8–4–0	Los Angeles	9–3–0	Washington	8–4–0
13	St. Louis	9–4–0	Minnesota	9–4–0	Los Angeles	9–4–0	Washington	9–4–0
14	St. Louis	10–4–0	Minnesota	10–4–0	Los Angeles	10–4–0	Washington	10–4–0

=== American Football Conference ===
Week	Eastern		Central		Western		Wild Card	
1	Buffalo, New England	1–0–0	Pittsburgh, Houston, Cincinnati	1–0–0	Kansas City	1–0–0	Denver, Kansas City, San Diego	1–0–0
2	New England	2–0–0	Pittsburgh	1–0–1	Oakland*	1–1–0	8 teams	1–1–0
3	New England	3–0–0	Cincinnati	2–1–0	Oakland*	2–1–0	3 teams	2–1–0
4	New England	4–0–0	Cincinnati	3–1–0	Oakland	3–1–0	Pittsburgh	2–1–1
5	New England	5–0–0	Cincinnati	4–1–0	Oakland	4–1–0	Buffalo	4–1–0
6	Buffalo	5–1–0	Pittsburgh	4–1–1	Oakland	5–1–0	New England	5–1–0
7	Buffalo	6–1–0	Pittsburgh	5–1–1	Oakland	6–1–0	New England	6–1–0
8	Buffalo	7–1–0	Pittsburgh	6–1–1	Oakland	7–1–0	New England	6–2–0
9	Miami	7–2–0	Pittsburgh	6–2–1	Oakland	8–1–0	Buffalo	7–2–0
10	Miami	8–2–0	Pittsburgh	7–2–1	Oakland	9–1–0	Buffalo	7–3–0
11	Miami	8–3–0	Pittsburgh	8–2–1	Oakland	9–2–0	Buffalo	8–3–0
12	Miami	9–3–0	Pittsburgh	8–3–1	Oakland	10–2–0	Buffalo	9–3–0
13	Miami	10–3–0	Pittsburgh	9–3–1	Oakland	11–2–0	Buffalo	9–4–0
14	Miami	11–3–0	Pittsburgh	10–3–1	Oakland	12–2–0	Buffalo	9–5–0

== Final standings ==
AFC East
	W	L	T	PCT	DIV	CONF	PF	PA	STK
Miami Dolphins	11	3	0	.786	6–2	9–2	327	216	W3
Buffalo Bills	9	5	0	.643	5–3	7–4	264	244	L2
New York Jets	7	7	0	.500	4–4	5–6	279	300	W6
New England Patriots	7	7	0	.500	4–4	4–7	348	289	L3
Baltimore Colts	2	12	0	.143	1–7	1–10	190	329	L4

AFC Central
	W	L	T	PCT	DIV	CONF	PF	PA	STK
Pittsburgh Steelers	10	3	1	.750	4–2	7–3–1	305	189	W2
Houston Oilers	7	7	0	.500	4–2	7–4	236	282	W1
Cincinnati Bengals	7	7	0	.500	3–3	5–6	283	259	L3
Cleveland Browns	4	10	0	.286	1–5	3–8	251	344	L2

AFC West
	W	L	T	PCT	DIV	CONF	PF	PA	STK
Oakland Raiders	12	2	0	.857	5–1	9–2	355	228	W3
Denver Broncos	7	6	1	.536	3–3	5–4–1	302	294	L1
Kansas City Chiefs	5	9	0	.357	2–4	4–7	233	293	L2
San Diego Chargers	5	9	0	.357	2–4	4–7	212	285	W2

NFC East
	W	L	T	PCT	DIV	CONF	PF	PA	STK
St. Louis Cardinals	10	4	0	.714	7–1	8–3	285	218	W1
Washington Redskins	10	4	0	.714	5–3	8–3	320	196	W2
Dallas Cowboys	8	6	0	.571	4–4	6–5	297	235	L1
Philadelphia Eagles	7	7	0	.500	3–5	5–6	242	217	W3
New York Giants	2	12	0	.143	1–7	1–10	195	299	L6

NFC Central
	W	L	T	PCT	DIV	CONF	PF	PA	STK
Minnesota Vikings	10	4	0	.714	4–2	8–3	310	195	W3
Detroit Lions	7	7	0	.500	3–3	6–5	256	270	L1
Green Bay Packers	6	8	0	.429	3–3	4–7	210	206	L3
Chicago Bears	4	10	0	.286	2–4	4–7	152	279	L2

NFC West
	W	L	T	PCT	DIV	CONF	PF	PA	STK
Los Angeles Rams	10	4	0	.714	5–1	7–3	263	181	W1
San Francisco 49ers	6	8	0	.429	4–2	6–5	226	236	W2
New Orleans Saints	5	9	0	.357	3–3	5–6	166	263	L1
Atlanta Falcons	3	11	0	.214	0–6	3–8	111	271	W1

=== Tiebreakers ===
- N.Y. Jets finished ahead of New England in the AFC East based on better conference record (5–6 to Patriots' 4–7).
- Houston finished ahead of Cincinnati in the AFC Central based on head-to-head sweep (2–0).
- Kansas City finished ahead of San Diego in the AFC West based on better point-differential in head-to-head competition (3 points).
- St. Louis finished ahead of Washington in the NFC East based on head-to-head sweep (2–0).

== Playoffs ==
Note: Prior to the 1975 season, the home teams in the playoffs were decided based on a yearly rotation. Had the 1974 playoffs been seeded, the AFC divisional matchups would have been #3 Pittsburgh at #2 Miami and #4 wild card Buffalo at #1 Oakland. The NFC divisional matchups would have been #4 wild card Washington at #1 Minnesota and #3 Los Angeles at #2 St. Louis (the Cardinals, Rams and Vikings all finished 10–4, and since the Cardinals and Rams did not play in the regular season, the tiebreaker would have been winning percentage in conference games. Minnesota and St. Louis were both 8–3 (.727) vs. NFC opponents, compared to 7–3 (.700) for Los Angeles. With the Rams eliminated, the Vikings and Cardinals would then revert to the first tiebreaker step for two teams, head-to-head. Minnesota defeated St. Louis 28–24 in week nine and thus would have earned the higher seed).

Dec 22 – Three Rivers Stadium
WC	Buffalo	14
Dec 29 – Oakland Coliseum
Cent.	Pittsburgh	32
AFC
Cent.	Pittsburgh	24
Dec 21 – Oakland Coliseum
West	Oakland	13
AFC Championship
East	Miami	26
Jan 12 – Tulane Stadium
West	Oakland	28
Divisional round
AFC	Pittsburgh	16
Dec 22 – Los Angeles Memorial Coliseum
NFC	Minnesota	6
Super Bowl IX
WC	Washington	10
Dec 29 – Metropolitan Stadium
West	Los Angeles	19
NFC
West	Los Angeles	10
Dec 21 – Metropolitan Stadium
Cent.	Minnesota	14
NFC Championship
East	St. Louis	14
Cent.	Minnesota	30

== Awards ==
Most Valuable Player	Ken Stabler, quarterback, Oakland
Coach of the Year	Don Coryell, St. Louis Cardinals
Offensive Player of the Year	Ken Stabler, quarterback, Oakland
Defensive Player of the Year	Joe Greene, defensive end, Pittsburgh
Offensive Rookie of the Year	Don Woods, running back, San Diego
Defensive Rookie of the Year	Jack Lambert, linebacker, Pittsburgh
Man of the Year	George Blanda, quarterback, Oakland
Comeback Player of the Year	Joe Namath, quarterback, New York
Super Bowl Most Valuable Player	Franco Harris, running back, Pittsburgh

== Coaching changes ==
=== Offseason ===
- Detroit Lions: Don McCafferty died on July 28, 1974, after suffering a heart attack. Assistant coach Rick Forzano was promoted to head coach and remained in the position for two and a half seasons.
- Houston Oilers: This was Sid Gillman's first full season as head coach after replacing Bill Peterson, who was fired after the Oilers lost their first five games in 1973.
- New York Giants: Alex Webster was replaced by Bill Arnsparger, architect of the Miami Dolphins' "No-Name Defense".
- New York Jets: After 11 seasons as head coach, Weeb Ewbank resigned and was replaced by Charley Winner, Ewbank's son-in-law and head coach of the Cardinals from 1966 to 1970.
- San Diego Chargers: Tommy Prothro became the team's new head coach. Harland Svare left the team midway through the 1973 season after going 1–6–1, and Ron Waller served for the last six games.

=== In-season ===
- Atlanta Falcons: Norm Van Brocklin was fired after starting the season at 2–6. Defensive coordinator Marion Campbell served as head coach for the remainder of the season. He was elevated to full-time head coach for 1975, but fired midway through the 1976 season; Campbell returned to the Falcons from 1987 to 1989 after three seasons as head coach of the Philadelphia Eagles.
- Baltimore Colts: Howard Schnellenberger was fired after three games into the season. General Manager Joe Thomas served as head coach for the remainder of the season.

== Uniform changes ==
- The Buffalo Bills replaced their standing red bison helmet logo with a charging blue one with a red slanting stripe coming from its horns.
- The Dallas Cowboys moved the TV numbers on their white jerseys from the sleeves to the shoulders, where they had been from 1964 to 1969. TV numbers on the blue jerseys remained on the sleeves until 1979.
- The Kansas City Chiefs switched from gray to white face masks. The arrowhead logo on the helmets shrank in size, while the black border on the arrowhead became thicker.
- The Miami Dolphins modified its helmet logo so that the sunburst was centered on the dolphin's body instead of its head. Several players wore this logo during the 1973 playoffs and Super Bowl VIII.
- The Philadelphia Eagles switched from white to green helmets, and added sleeve stripes and trim to the numbers. Pants changed from white to silver.
- The San Diego Chargers introduced new uniforms, changing their primary color from sky powder blue to royal blue. The helmets were also changed from white to royal blue, and the players' numbers on its sides were removed. In addition, the face masks were switched from gray to yellow.
- The Chiefs and Chargers were the first NFL teams to wear face masks in a color other than the then-predominant gray.

== Television ==
ABC, CBS, and NBC each signed four-year contracts to renew their rights to broadcast Monday Night Football, the NFC package, and the AFC package, respectively. The major change was that ABC was also given the rights to the Pro Bowl, instead of having the game rotate annually between CBS and NBC.

Don Meredith left ABC to join NBC's lead broadcast team of Curt Gowdy and Al DeRogatis in their own three-man booth. NBC also hired the then-recently retired quarterback John Brodie to replace Kyle Rote as the network's #2 color commentator, alongside Jim Simpson. ABC initially hired Fred Williamson to replace Meredith in the MNF booth, but he was so inarticulate during the preseason broadcasts that Williamson was replaced by Alex Karras for the regular season.

CBS abandoned its pre-recorded The NFL Today pregame show in favor of a live, wraparound style program titled The NFL on CBS. Jack Buck was originally promoted to replace Ray Scott as the network's lead play-by-play announcer alongside color commentator Pat Summerall; only for CBS to shift Summerall from color commentator to play-by-play at midseason. Tom Brookshier was then paired with Summerall.
