= Dolphins–Raiders rivalry =

National Football League rivalry

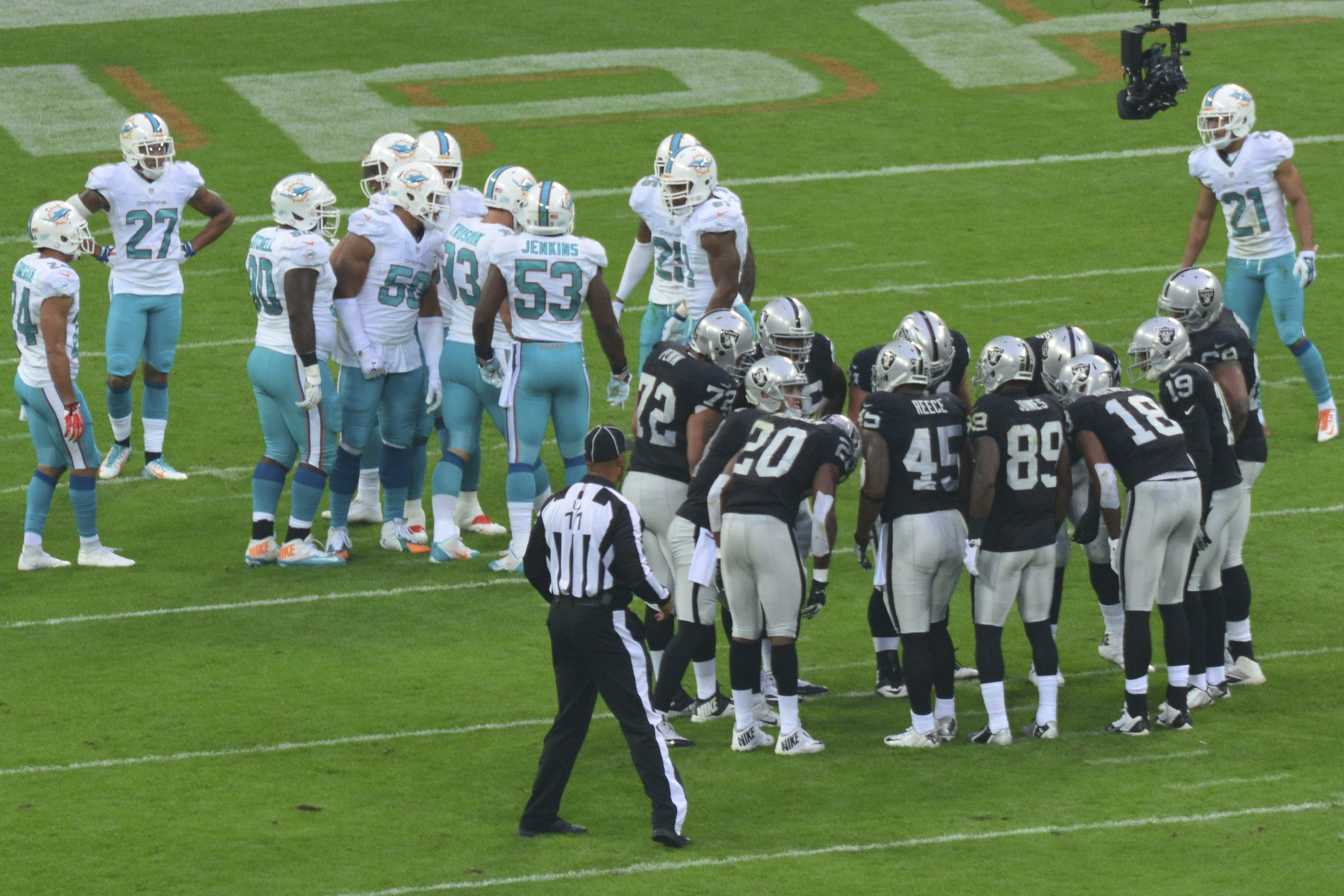
- Raiders and Dolphins huddling in 2014

- Miami Dolphins Las Vegas Raiders
- Location: Miami, Las Vegas
- First meeting: September 2, 1966; Raiders 23, Dolphins 14
- Latest meeting: September 13, 2026; Raiders 27, Dolphins 13
- Next meeting: TBD (no later than 2029)
- Stadiums: Dolphins: Hard Rock Stadium; Raiders: Allegiant Stadium

Statistics
- Total meetings: 44
- All-time series: Raiders: 22–21–1
- Regular season series: Dolphins: 20–19–1
- Postseason results: Raiders: 3–1
- Largest victory: Dolphins: 38–14 (2014); Raiders: 27–0 (2000)
- Most points scored: Dolphins: 38 (2014); Raiders: 47 (1968)
- Longest win streak: Dolphins: 5 (2008–2014); Raiders: 6 (1979–1986)
- Current win streak: Raiders: 1 (2026–present)

Post-season history
- 1970 AFC Divisional: Raiders won: 21–14; 1973 AFC Championship: Dolphins won: 27–10; 1974 AFC Divisional: Raiders won: 28–26; 2000 AFC Divisional: Raiders won: 27–0

The Dolphins–Raiders rivalry is a National Football League (NFL) rivalry between the Miami Dolphins and the Las Vegas Raiders.

== History ==
The Raiders were the Dolphins' first opponents during Miami's inaugural 1966 season. In that game, Joe Auer returned the opening kickoff 95 yards for a touchdown, but the Raiders went on to win 23–14. The Raiders dominated the Dolphins in their first 21 meetings, going 16–4–1 in that span. The two teams would meet three times in the playoffs in the early 1970s.

The first of these meetings came in the 1970 Divisional Round. In that game, Raiders quarterback Daryle Lamonica sealed the game in the fourth quarter with an 82-yard touchdown pass to Rod Sherman, leading to a 21–14 Raiders victory. The two teams would not face each other for two seasons, during which Miami became the only NFL team to finish an entire season undefeated during the 1972 season. Miami's winning streak would stretch to 18 games when they faced the Raiders on the road during the 1973 season. This game, which took place at California Memorial Stadium in Berkeley due to a scheduling conflict with the Oakland Athletics at the Oakland Coliseum, saw the Raiders defeat the Dolphins 12–7 behind four field goals from George Blanda. Miami avenged this defeat, however, defeating the Raiders 27–10 in the AFC Championship Game en route to winning Super Bowl VIII. In that game, Dolphins running back Larry Csonka ran for 266 yards and three touchdowns.

The Dolphins entered the 1974 Divisional Round as two-time defending Super Bowl champions, while the Raiders were seeking to return to the AFC Championship Game. In what became known as The Sea of Hands game, Raiders quarterback Ken Stabler threw an eight-yard touchdown pass to a tightly defended Clarence Davis, leading Oakland to a 28–26 victory and ended Miami's quest for a third consecutive title.

Though the Dolphins and Raiders would not meet in the postseason for the next 26 years, there were some notable moments that took place in between. In Week 2 of the 1975 season, Miami's 27-game home winning streak was snapped by the Raiders in a 31–21 defeat. Then in Week 3 of the 1983 season Dolphins quarterback Dan Marino made his NFL debut against the newly relocated Los Angeles Raiders, throwing his first touchdown passes in a 27–14 loss. In Week 14 of the 1984 season, Marino threw for 470 yards and four touchdowns, but Raiders running back Marcus Allen ran for 155 yards and three touchdowns, two of which came in the fourth quarter, in the Raiders' 45–34 victory.

After the Raiders returned to Oakland in 1995, the two teams resumed their playoff rivalry in the 2000 Divisional Round. However, this game ended rather quickly as the Raiders scored 20 first-half points and blanked the Dolphins in a 27–0 shutout. The loss was only one of five Miami would suffer since 1992, as they won 15 games to close the gap in the series. One of those wins took place at Wembley Stadium in London during the 2014 season, with Miami taking a 38–14 decision. The Dolphins also defeated the now-Las Vegas Raiders 26–25 at Allegiant Stadium in Week 16 of the 2020 season, ending the Raiders' playoff hopes.

Following the 2021 season, the Dolphins and Raiders each made the biggest blockbuster trades of the 2022 offseason by trading for Pro Bowl wide receivers; the Raiders traded for Green Bay Packers receiver Davante Adams on March 17, 2022, and just a week later, the Dolphins traded for Kansas City Chiefs star receiver Tyreek Hill. Also notable is the fact both teams have quarterback–wide receiver duos who had previously played together in college, with the Dolphins having Alabama alums Tua Tagovailoa and Jaylen Waddle, and the Raiders with Fresno State alums Derek Carr and Davante Adams.

== Season-by-season results ==
Miami Dolphins vs. Oakland/Los Angeles/Las Vegas Raiders Season-by-Season Results
1960s (Raiders, 5–0–1)

Season	Results	Location	Overall series	Notes
1966	Raiders; 23–14	Orange Bowl	Raiders; 1–0	Dolphins' inaugural season. First meeting at Orange Bowl.
1966	Raiders; 21–10	Oakland Coliseum	Raiders; 2–0	First meeting at Oakland Coliseum
1967	Raiders; 31–17	Oakland Coliseum	Raiders; 3–0	Raiders win 1967 AFL Championship, lose Super Bowl II.
1968	Raiders; 47–21	Orange Bowl	Raiders; 4–0	Raiders lose 1968 AFL Championship. Last game for John Rauch as Raiders head coach.
1969	Raiders; 20–17	Oakland Coliseum	Raiders; 5–0	First game in series for John Madden as Raiders head coach.
1969	Tie; 20–20	Orange Bowl	Raiders; 5–0–1	Raiders lose 1969 AFL Championship. Last game in series for George Wilson as Dolphins head coach.

1970s (Raiders, 5–3)

Season	Results	Location	Overall series	Notes
1970	Dolphins; 20–13	Orange Bowl	Raiders; 5–1–1	
1970 playoffs	Raiders 21–14	Oakland Coliseum	Raiders 6–1–1	AFC Divisional Round. First postseason game for the Miami Dolphins
1973	Raiders; 12–7	California Memorial Stadium	Raiders; 7–1–1	The game moved from Oakland Coliseum due to a scheduling conflict with the Oakland Athletics. Raiders ended the Dolphins’ 18-game winning streak, becoming the first team to defeat them since the 1971 Dallas Cowboys in Super Bowl VI.
1973 playoffs	Dolphins 27–10	Orange Bowl	Raiders 7–2–1	AFC Championship Game. Dolphins win Super Bowl VIII.
1974 playoffs	Raiders 28–26	Oakland Coliseum	Raiders 8–2–1	AFC Divisional Round. Also known as The Sea of Hands game, where Raiders quarterback Ken Stabler converted a game-winning eight-yard touchdown pass to Clarence Davis amid three Dolphins players.
1975	Raiders; 31–21	Orange Bowl	Raiders; 9–2–1	Raiders’ win ended the Dolphins’ 31-game home winning streak and handed them their first home loss since the 1971 season, setting the NFL record for the longest home winning streak.
1978	Dolphins; 23–6	Orange Bowl	Raiders; 9–3–1	Last game in the series for John Madden as Raiders head coach.
1979	Raiders; 13–3	Oakland Coliseum	Raiders; 10–3–1	First game in series for Tom Flores as Raiders head coach. Last game in the series for both Ken Stabler and Bob Griese.

1980s (Raiders, 5–1)

Season	Results	Location	Overall series	Notes
1980	Raiders; 16–10	Oakland Coliseum	Raiders; 11–3–1	Final meeting in Oakland until 1996. Raiders win Super Bowl XV.
1981	Raiders; 33–17	Orange Bowl	Raiders; 12–3–1	
1983	Raiders; 27–14	Los Angeles Memorial Coliseum	Raiders; 13–3–1	First meeting in Los Angeles. Dan Marino's first NFL game. Raiders win Super Bowl XVIII.
1984	Raiders; 45–34	Orange Bowl	Raiders; 14–3–1	Dolphins lose Super Bowl XIX.
1986	Raiders; 30–28	Orange Bowl	Raiders; 15–3–1	Final meeting at Orange Bowl. Last game in the series for Tom Flores as Raiders head coach.
1988	Dolphins; 24–14	Los Angeles Memorial Coliseum	Raiders; 15–4–1	Dolphins' first road victory over the Raiders. Final meeting in Los Angeles. Only meeting in a series for Mike Shanahan as Raiders head coach.

1990s (Dolphins, 5–2)

Season	Results	Location	Overall series	Notes
1990	Raiders; 13–10	Joe Robbie Stadium	Raiders; 16–4–1	First meeting at Joe Robbie Stadium (now Hard Rock Stadium). The first meeting in the series for Art Shell as Raiders head coach.
1992	Dolphins; 20–7	Joe Robbie Stadium	Raiders; 16–5–1	
1994	Dolphins; 20–17 (OT)	Joe Robbie Stadium	Raiders; 16–6–1	Last meeting in series for Don Shula as Dolphins head coach and Art Shell as Raiders head coach.
1996	Raiders; 17–7	Oakland Coliseum	Raiders; 17–6–1	First meeting in Oakland since 1980. First meeting in series for Jimmy Johnson as Dolphins head coach. Only meeting in the series for Mike White as Raiders head coach.
1997	Dolphins; 34–16	Oakland Coliseum	Raiders; 17–7–1	Dolphins' first victory in Oakland. Only meeting in the series for Joe Bugel as Raiders head coach.
1998	Dolphins; 27–17	Network Associates Coliseum	Raiders; 17–8–1	First meeting in series for Jon Gruden as Raiders head coach. Final start in the series for Dan Marino as Dolphins quarterback.
1999	Dolphins; 16–9	Network Associates Coliseum	Raiders; 17–9–1	Final meeting in series for head coach Jimmy Johnson.

2000s (Dolphins, 4–2)

Season	Results	Location	Overall series	Notes
2000 playoffs	Raiders 27–0	Network Associates Coliseum	Raiders 18–9–1	AFC Divisional Round. The first meeting in the series for Dave Wannstedt as Dolphins head coach.
2001	Dolphins; 18–15	Pro Player Stadium	Raiders; 18–10–1	Last meeting in series for Jon Gruden during his first stint as Raiders head coach.
2002	Dolphins; 23–17	Pro Player Stadium	Raiders; 18–11–1	Raiders lose Super Bowl XXXVII. Only meeting in series for Bill Callahan as Raiders head coach.
2005	Dolphins; 33–21	McAfee Coliseum	Raiders; 18–12–1	Only meeting in series for both Nick Saban as Dolphins head coach and Norv Turner as Raiders head coach.
2007	Raiders; 35–17	Dolphin Stadium	Raiders; 19–12–1	Only meeting in series for both Lane Kiffin as Raiders head coach and Cam Cameron as Dolphins head coach. Raiders' win snapped their 12-game road losing streak.
2008	Dolphins; 17–15	Dolphin Stadium	Raiders; 19–13–1	First meeting in series for both Tony Sparano as Dolphins head coach and Tom Cable as Raiders head coach.

2010s (Dolphins, 5–1)

Season	Results	Location	Overall series	Notes
2010	Dolphins; 33–17	Oakland Coliseum	Raiders; 19–14–1	Final meeting in Oakland. Final meeting in series for Tom Cable as Raiders head coach.
2011	Dolphins; 34–14	Sun Life Stadium	Raiders; 19–15–1	Only meeting for Hue Jackson as Raiders head coach. Final meeting in series for Tony Sparano as Dolphins head coach.
2012	Dolphins; 35–13	Sun Life Stadium	Raiders; 19–16–1	First meeting in series for both Joe Philbin as Dolphins head coach and Dennis Allen as Raiders head coach.
2014	Dolphins; 38–14	Wembley Stadium	Raiders; 19–17–1	NFL International Series played in London. Officially a Raiders home game. Last game in series for both Dennis Allen as Raiders head coach ^{a} and Joe Philbin as Dolphins head coach
2017	Raiders; 27–24	Hard Rock Stadium	Raiders; 20–17–1	Only meeting in series for Jack Del Rio as Raiders head coach. First meeting in series for Adam Gase for Dolphins head coach.
2018	Dolphins; 28–20	Hard Rock Stadium	Raiders; 20–18–1	First meeting in series for Jon Gruden in his second stint as Raiders head coach. Last meeting in the series for Adam Gase as Dolphins head coach and for the Raiders as "Oakland Raiders".

2020s (Dolphins, 3–2)

Season	Results	Location	Overall series	Notes
2020	Dolphins; 26–25	Allegiant Stadium	Raiders; 20–19–1	First meeting in Las Vegas. First meeting in series for Brian Flores as Dolphins head coach.
2021	Raiders; 31–28 (OT)	Allegiant Stadium	Raiders; 21–19–1	Last meeting in series for both Jon Gruden as Raiders head coach and Brian Flores as Dolphins head coach.
2023	Dolphins; 20–13	Hard Rock Stadium	Raiders; 21–20–1	
2024	Dolphins; 34–19	Hard Rock Stadium	Tie; 21–21–1	
2026	Raiders; 27–13	Allegiant Stadium	Raiders; 22–21–1	

Summary of results

Season	Season series	at Miami Dolphins	at Oakland/Los Angeles/Las Vegas Raiders	Notes
Regular season	Dolphins 20–19–1	Dolphins 12–9–1	Raiders 10–8	
Postseason	Raiders 3–1	Dolphins 1–0	Raiders 3–0	AFC Divisional: 1970, 1974, 2000; AFC Championship: 1973
Regular and postseason	Raiders 22–21–1	Dolphins 13–9–1	Raiders 13–8	

== Footnotes ==
- ^{a} Allen was fired after this game; with former Dolphins coach Tony Sparano serving as interim head coach

== Connections between the teams ==
=== Coaches/executives ===
Name	Dolphins' tenure	Raiders' tenure
Reggie McKenzie	2019–present, Senior personnel executive	2012–2018, General manager
Bob Sanders	2001–2004, Linebackers coach	2013–2014, Linebackers coach
Tony Sparano	2008–2011, Head coach	2014, Assistant head coach and offensive line coach 2014, Interim head coach
Norv Turner	2002–2003, Offensive coordinator	2004–2005, Head coach

=== Players ===
Name	Position(s)	Dolphins' tenure	Raiders' tenure
Damon Arnette	Cornerback	2021*	2020–2021
Brandon Bolden	Running back	2018	2022–2023
Adam Butler	Defensive tackle	2021	2023–present
Daunte Culpepper	Quarterback	2006	2007
Kenyan Drake	Running back	2016–2019	2021–2022
Neil Farrell	Nose tackle	2024	2022
Mack Hollins	Wide receiver	2019–2021	2022
Richie Incognito	Guard	2010–2013	2019–2021
Alec Ingold	Fullback	2022–2025	2019–2021
Dion Jordan	Defensive end	2013–2016	2019
Raekwon McMillan	Linebacker	2017–2019	2020
Raheem Mostert	Running back	2015, 2022–2024	2025
Alexander Mattison	Running back	2025	2024
Christian Wilkins	Defensive tackle	2019-2023	2024

*Offseason and/or practice squad member only

== See also ==
- National Football League rivalries
