= 1974 Oakland Raiders season =

NFL team season

- Owner: Al Davis
- General manager: Al Davis
- Head coach: John Madden
- Home stadium: Oakland–Alameda County Coliseum

Results
- Record: 12–2
- Division place: 1st AFC West
- Playoffs: Won Divisional Playoffs (vs. Dolphins) 28–26; Lost AFC Championship (vs. Steelers) 13–24

The 1974 Oakland Raiders season was the team's 15th season in Oakland and fifth in the National Football League. The team posted a 12–2 record; the campaign's two losses were by a total of four points. The Raiders' record (the team's best since 1969) ensured their fourth AFC West title in five years.

For the second straight campaign, the Raiders exacted revenge upon the team that had eliminated them in the prior year's playoffs. This time, Oakland toppled the two-time defending Super Bowl champion Miami Dolphins, by a score of 28–26, in the playoffs' Divisional round. Quarterback Ken Stabler (in his first full season as a starter) threw a last-minute winning touchdown pass to running back Clarence Davis in what has come to be known as the "Sea of Hands" game.

For the second straight season, however, the Raiders lost in the AFC Championship Game. They were upset, 24–13, by the eventual champion Pittsburgh Steelers. While the Raiders led 10–3 at the end of the third quarter, a defensive meltdown allowed the Steelers to score 21 points in the final frame.

The 2006 edition of Pro Football Prospectus listed the 1974 Raiders as one of their "Heartbreak Seasons", in which teams "dominated the entire regular season only to falter in the playoffs, unable to close the deal." Pro Football Prospectus states, The John Madden Raiders were a consistently good regular season team, but the playoffs were a different story. The 1972 season came to an end with the painful Immaculate Reception game. The 1973 Raiders ended Miami's 18-game winning streak during the regular season but lost to the Dolphins in the AFC Championship game. In 1974, the Raiders seemed to finally have all the pieces."

Despite the disappointment at the end of the 1974 season, Pro Football Prospectus continues, "[t]he Raiders persevered, keeping the team's core together the next several seasons. In 1975, they again fell to the Steelers in the AFC title game, but caught a break in the 1976 AFC Championship, when they cruised to a 24–7 victory over Pittsburgh, who were without running backs Franco Harris and Rocky Bleier. Finally, in the Super Bowl, they did not waste their opportunity, crushing the Vikings 32–14 behind Ken Stabler and Clarence Davis."

"The Autumn Wind", a poem written by former NFL Films President and co-founder Steve Sabol, became the unofficial team anthem of the Raiders, and was first used for the team's official team yearbook film in 1974. It was narrated by John Facenda, and dubbed "The Battle Hymn of the Raider Nation".

1974 marked the end of an era, as the last remaining original Raider, longtime offensive lineman Jim Otto, retired after all 10 seasons in the AFL, 5 seasons in the NFL, and 15 seasons with the Raiders. Counting playoff games, he showed up for every one of the first 223 games in Oakland Raiders history.

== Offseason ==
=== Draft ===
1974 Oakland Raiders draft
| Round | Pick | Player | Position | College | Notes |
| 1 | 19 | Henry Lawrence * | Tackle | Florida A&M | |
| 2 | 45 | Dave Casper * ^{†} | Tight end | Notre Dame | |
| 3 | 75 | Mark van Eeghen | Running back | Colgate | |
| 4 | 93 | Morris Bradshaw | Wide receiver | Ohio State | |
| 5 | 123 | Pete Wessel | Defensive back | Northwestern | |
| 6 | 148 | James McAlister | Running back | UCLA | Signed with Southern California Sun (WFL) |
| 7 | 175 | Rod Garcia | Kicker | Stanford | |
| 9 | 227 | Ken Pope | Defensive back | Oklahoma | |
| 10 | 253 | Chris Arnold | Defensive back | Virginia State | |
| 11 | 279 | Harold Hart | Running back | Texas Southern | |
| 12 | 305 | Noe Gonzalez | Running back | Southwest Texas State | |
| 13 | 330 | Mike Dennery | Linebacker | Southern Miss | |
| 14 | 357 | Don Willingham | Running back | Milwaukee | |
| 15 | 383 | Greg Mathis | Defensive back | Idaho State | |
| 16 | 409 | Delario Robinson | Wide receiver | Kansas | |
| 17 | 435 | James Morris | Defensive tackle | Missouri Valley | |
Made roster † Pro Football Hall of Fame * Made at least one Pro Bowl during career

== Personnel ==
=== Staff / Coaches ===
1974 Oakland Raiders staff
| Front office: Principal Owner/General Manager - Al Davis; Minority Co-Owner - Eddie McGah; Minority Co-Owner - F. Wayne Valley; President of the General Partner / General Manager – Al Davis; Senior Executive – John Herrera; Scout/ Executive assistant, Personnel Director - Ken Herock; Executive Assistant / Scout - Al LoCasale; Head coaches: Head Coach – John Madden; Assistant Head Coach / Executive Assistant - Tom Flores; Offensive coaches: Offensive Backs – Paul Roach; Receivers Coach – Tom Flores; Offensive line – Ollie Spencer | Defensive coaches: Defensive Line – Tom Dahms; Linebackers – Don Shinnick; Defensive Backfield – Bob Zeman; Special teams coaches: Special teams – None - N/A |

=== Roster ===
1974 Oakland Raiders roster
| Quarterbacks (QB): 3 Daryle Lamonica; 13 Larry Lawrence; 12 Ken Stabler; Running backs (RB): 40 Pete Banaszak; 28 Clarence Davis; 34 Harold Hart; 44 Marv Hubbard; 36 Bob Hudson; 23 Charlie Smith; 30 Mark van Eeghen; Wide receivers (WR): 25 Fred Biletnikoff; 21 Cliff Branch; 85 Frank Pitts; Tight ends (TE): 46 Warren Bankston; 87 Dave Casper; 88 Bob Moore | Offensive linemen (OL): 64 George Buehler G; 50 Dave Dalby C; 70 Henry Lawrence T; 79 Dan Medlin G; 00 Jim Otto C; 78 Art Shell T; 63 Gene Upshaw G; 75 John Vella T; Defensive linemen (DL): 84 Tony Cline DE; 82 Horace Jones DE; 71 Kelvin Korver DT; 60 Otis Sistrunk DT; 77 Bubba Smith DE; 80 Art Thoms DT | Linebackers (LB): 54 Mike Dennery OLB; 55 Dan Conners MLB; 86 Gerald Irons OLB; 58 Monte Johnson MLB; 41 Phil Villapiano OLB; 52 Gary Weaver OLB; Defensive backs (DB): 43 George Atkinson SS; 24 Willie Brown CB; 29 Bob Prout FS; 27 Ron Smith SS; 31 Jack Tatum FS; 26 Skip Thomas CB; 20 Jimmy Warren FS/CB; 43 Nemiah Wilson CB; Special teams (ST): 16 George Blanda K; 8 Ray Guy P; 6 George Jakowenko K | Reserve: 81 Morris Bradshaw WR (IR); 18 Kent Gaydos TE (IR); 49 Mike Siani WR (IR); Rookies in italics |

== Regular season ==
=== Schedule ===
| Week | Date | Opponent | Result | Record | Venue | Attendance | Recap |
|---|---|---|---|---|---|---|---|
| 1 | September 16 | at Buffalo Bills | **L** 20–21 | 0–1 | Rich Stadium | 80,020 | Recap |
| 2 | September 22 | **Kansas City Chiefs** | **W** 27–7 | 1–1 | Oakland–Alameda County Coliseum | 48,108 | Recap |
| 3 | September 29 | at Pittsburgh Steelers | **W** 17–0 | 2–1 | Three Rivers Stadium | 48,304 | Recap |
| 4 | October 6 | at Cleveland Browns | **W** 40–24 | 3–1 | Cleveland Municipal Stadium | 65,247 | Recap |
| 5 | October 13 | at **San Diego Chargers** | **W** 14–10 | 4–1 | San Diego Stadium | 40,539 | Recap |
| 6 | October 20 | Cincinnati Bengals | **W** 30–27 | 5–1 | Oakland–Alameda County Coliseum | 54,020 | Recap |
| 7 | October 27 | at San Francisco 49ers | **W** 35–24 | 6–1 | Candlestick Park | 58,284 | Recap |
| 8 | November 3 | at **Denver Broncos** | **W** 28–17 | 7–1 | Mile High Stadium | 45,946 | Recap |
| 9 | November 10 | Detroit Lions | **W** 35–13 | 8–1 | Oakland–Alameda County Coliseum | 51,973 | Recap |
| 10 | November 17 | **San Diego Chargers** | **W** 17–10 | 9–1 | Oakland–Alameda County Coliseum | 50,178 | Recap |
| 11 | November 24 | **Denver Broncos** | **L** 17–20 | 9–2 | Oakland–Alameda County Coliseum | 51,224 | Recap |
| 12 | December 1 | New England Patriots | **W** 41–26 | 10–2 | Oakland–Alameda County Coliseum | 50,120 | Recap |
| 13 | December 8 | at **Kansas City Chiefs** | **W** 7–6 | 11–2 | Arrowhead Stadium | 60,577 | Recap |
| 14 | December 14 | Dallas Cowboys | **W** 27–23 | 12–2 | Oakland–Alameda County Coliseum | 45,840 | Recap |
Note: Intra-division opponents are in **bold** text.

=== Game summaries ===
==== Week 1 ====
Week One: Oakland Raiders at Buffalo Bills – Game summary

| Quarter | 1 | 2 | 3 | 4 | Total |
|---|---|---|---|---|---|
| Raiders | 0 | 3 | 7 | 10 | **20** |
| **Bills** | 0 | 7 | 0 | 14 | **21** |

at Rich Stadium, Orchard Park, New York

- Date: September 16
- Game time: 9:00 p.m. EST
- Game weather: 59 F, wind 13 mph (21 km/h)
- Referee: Ben Dreith
- TV announcers (ABC): Frank Gifford, Howard Cosell and Alex Karras
- Box Score

Scoring summary

| Quarter | Time | Drive | | | Team | Scoring information | Score | |
| Quarter | Time | Plays | Yards | TOP | Team | Scoring information | Raiders | Bills |
|---|---|---|---|---|---|---|---|---|
| 2 | | | | | Bills | J. D. Hill 4-yard touchdown reception from Joe Ferguson, John Leypoldt kick good | 0 | 7 |
| 2 | | | | | Raiders | 34-yard field goal by George Blanda | 3 | 7 |
| 3 | | | | | Raiders | Clarence Davis 15-yard touchdown run, George Blanda kick good | 10 | 7 |
| 4 | | | | | Raiders | 41-yard field goal by George Blanda | 13 | 7 |
| 4 | | | | | Bills | Ahmad Rashad 8-yard touchdown reception from Joe Ferguson, John Leypoldt kick good | 13 | 14 |
| 4 | | | | | Raiders | Fumble recovery returned 29 yards for touchdown by Art Thoms, George Blanda kick good | 20 | 14 |
| 4 | | | | | Bills | Ahmad Rashad 13-yard touchdown reception from Joe Ferguson, John Leypoldt kick good | 20 | 21 |
| "TOP" = time of possession. For other American football terms, see Glossary of American football. | | | | | | | 20 | 21 |

==== Week 2 ====
| Team | 1 | 2 | 3 | 4 | Total |
|---|---|---|---|---|---|
| Chiefs | 0 | 0 | 7 | 0 | 7 |
| • Raiders | 7 | 13 | 0 | 7 | 27 |

- Date: September 22
- Location: Oakland–Alameda County Coliseum, Oakland, California
- Game start: 1:00 p.m.
- Game weather: 60 °F (16 °C) • Wind 9 mph (14 km/h)
- Referee: Fred Silva
- Television network: NBC

Scoring summary
| 1 | OAK | Dave Casper 5 yard pass from Ken Stabler (George Blanda kick) | Raiders 7–0 |
| 2 | OAK | Mike Siani 9 yard pass from Ken Stabler (George Blanda kick) | Raiders 14–0 |
| 2 | OAK | Pete Banaszak 20 yard run (kick failed) | Raiders 20–0 |
| 3 | KC | Wilbur Young 50 yard interception return (Jan Stenerud kick) | Raiders 20–7 |
| 4 | OAK | Dave Casper 2 yard pass from Ken Stabler (George Blanda kick) | Raiders 27–7 |

==== Week 3 ====
| Team | 1 | 2 | 3 | 4 | Total |
|---|---|---|---|---|---|
| • Raiders | 7 | 10 | 0 | 0 | 17 |
| Steelers | 0 | 0 | 0 | 0 | 0 |

- Date: September 29
- Location: Three Rivers Stadium, Pittsburgh, Pennsylvania
- Game start: 4:00 p.m.
- Game weather: 63 °F (17 °C) • Wind 15 mph (24 km/h)

Scoring summary
| 1 | OAK | Ken Stabler 1 yard run (George Blanda kick) | Raiders 7–0 |
| 2 | OAK | Cliff Branch 19 yard pass from Ken Stabler (George Blanda kick) | Raiders 14–0 |
| 2 | OAK | George Blanda 35 yard field goal | Raiders 17–0 |

==== Week 14 ====
| Team | 1 | 2 | 3 | 4 | Total |
|---|---|---|---|---|---|
| Cowboys | 9 | 0 | 7 | 7 | 23 |
| • **Raiders** | 3 | 14 | 7 | 3 | 27 |

- Date: December 14
- Location: Oakland–Alameda County Coliseum, Oakland, California
- Game start: 6:00 p.m.
- Game weather: 53 °F (12 °C) • Wind 7 mph (11 km/h)
- Referee: Bob Frederic
- TV announcers (ABC): Frank Gifford, Howard Cosell and Alex Karras

Scoring summary
| 1 | DAL | Drew Pearson recovers fumble in end zone (Efren Herrera kick) | Cowboys 7–0 |
| 1 | OAK | George Blanda 31 yard field goal | Cowboys 7–3 |
| 1 | DAL | Safety, center snap fumbled out of end zone | Cowboys 9–3 |
| 2 | OAK | Fred Biletnikoff 9 yard pass from Ken Stabler (George Blanda kick) | Raiders 10–9 |
| 2 | OAK | Charlie Smith 14 yard pass from Ken Stabler (George Blanda kick) | Raiders 17–9 |
| 3 | OAK | Cliff Branch 28 yard pass from George Blanda (George Blanda kick) | Raiders 24–9 |
| 3 | DAL | Doug Dennison 1 yard run (Efren Herrera kick) | Raiders 24–16 |
| 4 | OAK | George Blanda 34 yard field goal | Raiders 27–16 |
| 4 | DAL | Doug Dennison 2 yard run (Efren Herrera kick) | Raiders 27–23 |

=== Standings ===
AFC West
| | W | L | T | PCT | DIV | CONF | PF | PA | STK |
|---|---|---|---|---|---|---|---|---|---|
| Oakland Raiders | 12 | 2 | 0 | .857 | 5–1 | 9–2 | 355 | 228 | W3 |
| Denver Broncos | 7 | 6 | 1 | .536 | 3–3 | 5–4–1 | 302 | 294 | L1 |
| Kansas City Chiefs | 5 | 9 | 0 | .357 | 2–4 | 4–7 | 233 | 293 | L2 |
| San Diego Chargers | 5 | 9 | 0 | .357 | 2–4 | 4–7 | 212 | 285 | W2 |

== Playoffs ==
| Round | Date | Opponent | Result | Record | Venue | Attendance |
|---|---|---|---|---|---|---|
| Divisional | December 21 | Miami Dolphins | W 28–26 | 1–0 | Oakland–Alameda County Coliseum | 52,817 |
| AFC Championship | December 29 | Pittsburgh Steelers | L 13–24 | 1–1 | Oakland–Alameda County Coliseum | 53,515 |

=== Game summaries ===
==== Divisional: vs. Miami Dolphins ====
| Team | 1 | 2 | 3 | 4 | Total |
|---|---|---|---|---|---|
| Dolphins | 7 | 3 | 6 | 10 | 26 |
| • Raiders | 0 | 7 | 7 | 14 | 28 |

- Date: December 21
- Location: Oakland–Alameda County Coliseum, Oakland, California
- Game start: 1:00 p.m. PST
- Game weather: 49 °F (9 °C), wind 8 mph (13 km/h)
- Referee: Ben Dreith
- TV announcers (NBC): Curt Gowdy, Al DeRogatis and Don Meredith
- Source: Pro-Football-Reference.com

Scoring summary
| 1 | Dolphins | Nat Moore 89 yard kickoff return (Garo Yepremian kick) | Dolphins 7–0 |
| 2 | Raiders | Charlie Smith 31 yard pass from Ken Stabler (George Blanda kick) | Tie 7–7 |
| 2 | Dolphins | Garo Yepremian 33 yard field goal | Dolphins 10–7 |
| 3 | Raiders | Fred Biletnikoff 13 yard pass from Ken Stabler (George Blanda kick) | Raiders 14–10 |
| 3 | Dolphins | Paul Warfield 16 yard pass from Bob Griese (kick failed) | Dolphins 16–14 |
| 4 | Dolphins | Garo Yepremian 46 yard field goal | Dolphins 19–14 |
| 4 | Raiders | Cliff Branch 72 yard pass from Ken Stabler (George Blanda kick) | Raiders 21–19 |
| 4 | Dolphins | Benny Malone 23 yard run (Garo Yepremian kick) | Dolphins 26–21 |
| 4 | Raiders | Clarence Davis 8 yard pass from Ken Stabler (George Blanda kick) | Raiders 28–26 |

Raiders go to the AFC Championship Game but lost to the eventual Super Bowl Champion Pittsburgh Steelers 24-13. And in 1975 finished 11-3 they win to the Cincinnati Bengals 31-28 but lost again to the Steelers but this time 16-10.
