= Oakland Raiders =

Former American football franchise in Oakland, California (1960–1981; 1995–2019)

- Wordmark
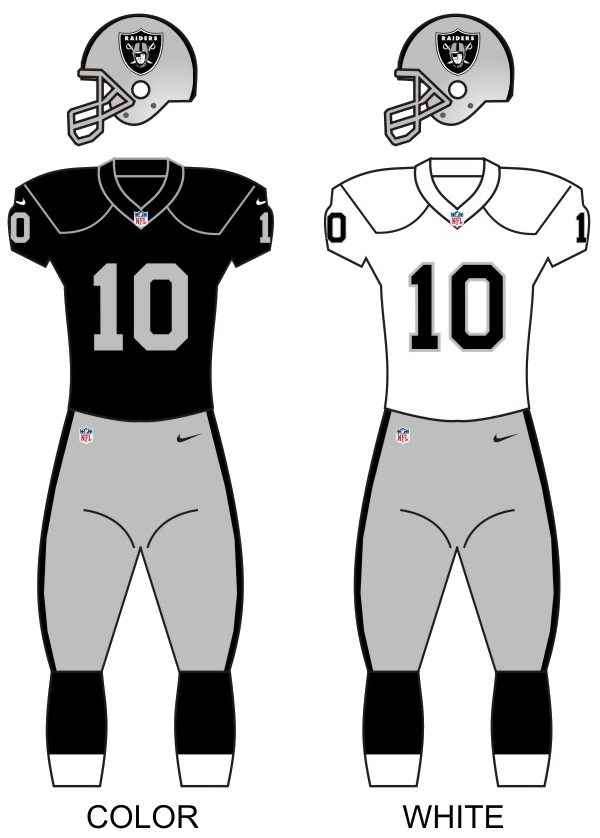
- Uniforms

General information
- Founded: 1960
- Folded: 2019
- Headquartered: Oakland, California
- Colors: Silver, black
- Fight song: The Autumn Wind
- Mascot: Raider Rusher
- Headquartered in Alameda, California

Personnel
- Owners: Chet Soda (1960); F. Wayne Valley (1961–1971); Ed McGah (1966–1971) Co-Owner; Al Davis (1966–2011); Mark Davis (2011–present)
- General manager: Chet Soda (1960); Paul Hastings (1961); Wes Fry (1962); Al Davis (1963–2011); Reggie McKenzie (2012–2018); Mike Mayock (2019)
- Head coach: Eddie Erdelatz (1960–1961); Marty Feldman (1961–1962); Red Conkright (1962); Al Davis (1963–1965); John Rauch (1966–1968); John Madden (1969–1978); Tom Flores (1979–1981); Mike White (1995–1996); Joe Bugel (1997); Jon Gruden (1998–2001); Bill Callahan (2002–2003); Norv Turner (2004–2005); Art Shell (2006); Lane Kiffin (2007–2008); Tom Cable (2008–2010); Hue Jackson (2011); Dennis Allen (2012–2014); Tony Sparano (2014); Jack Del Rio (2015–2017); Jon Gruden (2018–2019)

Nicknames
- Silver and Black; Men in Black; Team of the Decades; The World's Team; The Pride and Poise Boys; Raider Nation; Malosos (Mexican fan base)

Team history
- Oakland Raiders (1960–1981, 1995–2019); Los Angeles Raiders (1982–1994); Las Vegas Raiders (2020–present)

Home fields
- Kezar Stadium (1960); Candlestick Park (1960–1961); Frank Youell Field (1962–1965); Oakland Coliseum (1966–1981, 1995–2019)

League / conference affiliations
- American Football League (1960–1969): Western Division (1961–1969); National Football League (1970–2019): American Football Conference (1970–1981, 1995–2019); AFC West (1970–1981, 1995–2019)

Championships
- League championships: 2†: AFL championships (pre-1970 AFL–NFL merger) (1) 1967; Super Bowl championships: 2 1976 (XI), 1980 (XV); † – Does not include 1967 AFL championship won during the same season that the Super Bowl was contested
- Conference championships: 3: AFC: 1976, 1980, 2002
- Division championships: 12: AFL West: 1967, 1968, 1969; AFC West: 1970, 1972, 1973, 1974, 1975, 1976, 2000, 2001, 2002

Playoff appearances (15)
- AFL: 1967, 1968, 1969; NFL: 1970, 1972, 1973, 1974, 1975, 1976, 1977, 1980, 2000, 2001, 2002, 2016

The Oakland Raiders were a professional American football team of the National Football League (NFL). The Raiders played in Oakland, California, from its founding in 1960 to 1981, and again from 1995 to 2019 before moving to the Las Vegas metropolitan area where they now play as the Las Vegas Raiders. Between 1982 and 1994, the team played in Los Angeles, California as the Los Angeles Raiders.

Founded on January 30, 1960, the Oakland Raiders played their first regular season game on September 11, 1960, as a charter member of the American Football League (AFL). They moved to the NFL with the AFL–NFL merger in 1970. They played their last game as a California–based franchise on December 29, 2019. The Raiders played their home games at various venues in the San Francisco Bay Area before moving into Oakland-Alameda County Coliseum, their home stadium from 1966 to 1981, and later 1995 to 2019.

During their tenure in Oakland, the Raiders won 12 Division titles (three AFL West, nine AFC West); four AFL / AFC championships: 1967, 1976, 1980, and 2002; and two Super Bowl championships: 1976 (XI) and 1980 (XV).

== First Oakland era (1960–1981) ==
=== 1960–1962: Early years ===
A few months after the inaugural American Football League (AFL) draft in 1959, the owners of the yet-unnamed Minneapolis franchise accepted an offer to join the established National Football League (NFL) as an expansion team (now called the Minnesota Vikings) in 1961, sending the AFL scrambling for a replacement. At the time, Oakland, California, seemed an unlikely venue for a professional football team. The city had not asked for a team, there was no ownership group and there was no stadium in Oakland suitable for pro football (the closest stadiums were in Berkeley and San Francisco) and there was already a successful NFL franchise in the Bay Area in the San Francisco 49ers. However, the AFL owners selected Oakland after Los Angeles Chargers owner Barron Hilton threatened to forfeit his franchise unless a second team was placed on the West Coast. Accordingly, the city of Oakland was awarded the eighth AFL franchise on January 30, 1960, and the team inherited the Minneapolis club's draft picks.

Upon receiving the franchise, a meeting of local civic leaders and businessmen was called, chaired by former U.S. senator William Fife Knowland of California, editor of the Oakland Tribune. The gathering found a number of businessmen willing to invest in the new team. A limited partnership was formed to own the team headed by managing general partner Y. Charles (Chet) Soda, a local real estate developer, and included general partners Ed McGah, Oakland City Councilman Robert Osborne, F. Wayne Valley, restaurateur Harvey Binns, 1928 Olympic gold medalist Donald Blessing, and contractor Charles Harney, the builder of San Francisco's Candlestick Park, built on a bleak parcel of land he owned; the road leading to the stadium is known as Harney Way.

A "name the team" contest was held by the Oakland Tribune, and the winner was announced April 4, 1960, as the Oakland Señors. After a few days of being the butt of local jokes (and accusations that the contest was fixed, as Soda was fairly well known within the Oakland business community for calling his acquaintances "señor"), the fledgling team (and its owners) changed the team's name nine days later to the Oakland Raiders, which had finished third in the naming contest. The original team colors were black, gold and white. The now-familiar team emblem of a pirate (or "raider") wearing a football helmet was created, reportedly a rendition of actor Randolph Scott.

When the University of California refused to let the Raiders play home games at Memorial Stadium in Berkeley, they chose Kezar Stadium in San Francisco as their home field. The team's first regular season home game was played on September 11, 1960, a 37–22 loss to the Houston Oilers. The Raiders were allowed to move to Candlestick Park for the final three home games of the 1960 season after gaining the approval of San Francisco's Recreation and Park Commission, marking the first time that professional football would be played at the new stadium. The change of venue, however, failed to attract larger crowds. The Raiders finished their first campaign with a 6–8 record, and lost $500,000, equivalent to $5.44 million in 2025. Desperately in need of money to continue running the team, Valley received a $400,000 loan from Buffalo Bills founder Ralph Wilson, equivalent to $4.35 million in 2025.

After the conclusion of the first season Soda dropped out of the partnership, and on January 17, 1961, Valley, McGah and Osborne bought out the remaining four general partners. Soon after, Valley and McGah purchased Osborne's interest, with Valley named as the managing general partner. After splitting the previous home season between Kezar and Candlestick, the Raiders moved exclusively to Candlestick Park in 1961, where total attendance for the season was about 50,000, and finished 2–12. Valley threatened to move the Raiders out of the area unless a stadium was built in Oakland, but in 1962 the Raiders moved into 18,000-seat Frank Youell Field (later expanded to 22,000 seats), their first home in Oakland. It was a temporary home for the team while the Oakland–Alameda County Coliseum was under construction. Under Marty Feldman and Red Conkright—the team's second and third head coaches since entering the AFL—the Raiders finished 1–13 in 1962, losing their first 13 games (and making for a 19–game losing streak from 1961 and 1962) before winning the season finale, and attendance remained low.

=== 1963–1966 ===
After the 1962 season, Valley hired Al Davis, a former assistant coach of the San Diego Chargers, as head coach and general manager. At 33, he was the youngest person in over 30 years to hold the position of head coach, and the youngest person ever to hold the position of general manager, in professional football. Davis immediately changed the team colors to silver and black, and began to implement what he termed the "vertical game", an aggressive offensive strategy based on the West Coast offense developed by Chargers head coach Sid Gillman. Under Davis, the Raiders improved to 10–4, and he was named the AFL's Coach of the Year in 1963. Though the team slipped to 5–7–2 in 1964, it rebounded to an 8–5–1 record in 1965. He also initiated the use of team slogans such as "Pride and Poise", "Commitment to Excellence", and "Just Win, Baby"—all of which are registered trademarks.

In April 1966, Davis left the Raiders after being named AFL Commissioner. Two months later, the league announced its merger with the NFL. With the merger, the position of commissioner was no longer needed, and Davis entered into discussions with Valley about returning to the Raiders. On July 25, 1966, Davis returned as part-owner of the team. He purchased a 10 percent interest in the team for $18,000, equivalent to $178,615 in 2025, and became the team's third general partner—the partner in charge of football operations.

=== 1967: AFL champions ===
On the field, the team Davis had assembled and coached steadily improved. With John Rauch (Davis's successor by his choice) as head coach and quarterback Daryle Lamonica, the Raiders finished the 1967 season with a 13–1 record and won the 1967 AFL Championship, defeating the Houston Oilers 40–7. The win earned the team a trip to Super Bowl II at the Orange Bowl, where they were defeated 33–14 by Vince Lombardi's Green Bay Packers. Both of Oakland's touchdowns were scored on receptions by wide receiver Bill Miller.

=== 1968: "Heidi Bowl" ===
On November 17, 1968, Oakland scored two touchdowns in the final minute to defeat the New York Jets 43–32. However, NBC, decided to break away from its coverage to broadcast the television film Heidi, which caused many viewers to miss the Raiders' comeback. Oakland ended the 1968 season with a 12–2 record; defeating the Chiefs 41–6 in a tiebreaker playoff before losing 27–23 to the Jets in the AFL Championship Game.

=== 1969–1972: John Madden era begins ===
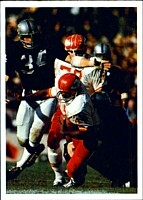
The Raiders won the 1967 AFL Championship Game, but lost the next two against the Jets and the Chiefs (pictured) before the NFL merger.

In 1969, John Madden became the team's sixth head coach, and under him the Raiders became one of the most successful franchises in the NFL. It was during Madden's tenure that the Raiders forged an image as a team of tough, take-no-prisoners players—such as future Hall of Fame offensive linemen Jim Otto, Gene Upshaw, and Art Shell; linebacker Ted ("the Stork") Hendricks; defensive end Ben Davidson; and defensive backs Jack ("the Assassin") Tatum, George Atkinson, and Skip ("Dr. Death") Thomas—who would occasionally cross the line into dirty play. Those teams also featured future Hall of Fame players in kicker George Blanda, tight end Dave ("the Ghost") Casper, and wide receivers Fred Biletnikoff and Cliff Branch, as well as fiery quarterback Ken ("the Snake") Stabler.

In 1970, the AFL–NFL merger took place and the Raiders became part of the Western Division of the American Football Conference (AFC) in the newly merged NFL. In 1972, with Wayne Valley out of the country for several weeks attending the Olympic Games in Munich, Davis's attorneys drafted a revised partnership agreement that gave him total control over all of the Raiders' operations. McGah, a supporter of Davis, signed the agreement. Under partnership law, by a 2–1 vote of the general partners, the new agreement was thus ratified. Valley was furious when he discovered this, and immediately filed suit to have the new agreement overturned, but the court sided with Davis and McGah.

Madden's first Raiders squad went 12–1–1 in 1969, but lost to the Kansas City Chiefs in the last AFL Championship Game, 17–7. This would become a frustrating trend during Madden's coaching career. Oakland won seven AFC West division titles and always played to a winning record during his ten seasons as head coach, but they also lost in six AFL / AFC Championship Games. One of the most frustrating playoff defeats came in 1972, when what appeared to be a last-minute AFC Divisional round victory over the Pittsburgh Steelers instead became a part of football lore when Franco Harris' "Immaculate Reception" gave Pittsburgh a 13–7 win.

=== 1973–1975: AFC Championship losses; "The Sea of Hands" ===
In 1973, the Raiders reached the AFC Championship with a 9–4–1 record, but lost 27–10 to the Miami Dolphins. In 1974, Oakland had a 12–2 regular season, which included a nine-game winning streak. Quarterback Ken Stabler earned NFL MVP honors. "The Autumn Wind", a poem written by former NFL Films President and co-founder Steve Sabol, became the unofficial team anthem, and was first used for the team's official yearbook film in 1974. It was narrated by John Facenda, and dubbed "The Battle Hymn of the Raider Nation". After knocking the two-time defending Super Bowl champion Dolphins out of the playoffs in dramatic fashion in which running back Clarence Davis caught a late 4th-quarter touchdown amid three Miami defenders ("The Sea of Hands") to win 28–26, the Raiders again lost to the Steelers in the AFC Championship game, 24–13. The Steelers would once more end the Raiders' season one game short of the Super Bowl in the 1975 AFC Championship game, 16–10.

=== 1976: Super Bowl XI champions ===
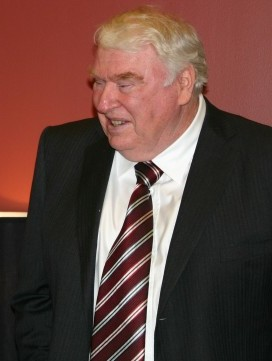
John Madden was the head coach of the Raiders for 10 seasons (1969–1978), leading them to seven AFL / AFC Championship Game appearances, and the franchise's first Super Bowl title in 1976 (XI)

==== 13–1 regular season ====
In 1976, Valley sold his interest in the team, and Davis—who now owned only 25 percent of the Raiders—was firmly in charge. The Raiders defeated Pittsburgh in a revenge match on the season opener and continued to cement their reputation for hard, dirty play by knocking receiver Lynn Swann out for two weeks in a helmet-to-helmet collision. Al Davis later tried to sue Steelers coach Chuck Noll for libel after the latter called safety George Atkinson a criminal for the hit.

The Raiders finished the 1976 regular season with a dominant 13–1 record. Quarterback Ken Stabler completed 66.7% of his passes. Fullback Mark van Eeghen rushed for 1,012 yards. Tight end Dave Casper led the team in receptions (53, including 10 touchdowns), while wide receiver Cliff Branch led in reception yards (1,111), touchdowns (12), and yards per reception (24.2).

==== AFC playoffs and Super Bowl XI ====
Oakland escaped the first round of the AFC playoffs with a dramatic and controversial 24–21 victory over the New England Patriots. New England's Ray Hamilton was tagged for roughing the passer in the fourth quarter, turning an incomplete pass on 3rd and 18 into a first down, and the Raiders went on to score on Ken Stabler's 1-yard touchdown run with 14 seconds left in the contest. In their third straight encounter with Pittsburgh in the 1976 AFC Championship Game, Madden's Raiders finally defeated their nemesis 24–7. The Raiders' defense stifled Terry Bradshaw, holding him to just 14-of-35 passing and intercepting him once.

Oakland's opponent in Super Bowl XI at the Rose Bowl was the Minnesota Vikings, a team that had lost three previous Super Bowls. The Raiders led 16–0 at halftime and, after forcing multiple turnovers, won 32–14 to secure their first Super Bowl championship. Pounding away inside defensive ends Carl Eller and Jim Marshall, the blocking of Art Shell and Gene Upshaw enabled the Raiders to rush for 266 yards, with Clarence Davis leading the attack with 137 yards. Ken Stabler completed 12-of-19 passes for 180 yards and a touchdown to tight end Dave Casper. Hall of Fame wide receiver Fred Biletnikoff was voted Super Bowl MVP, catching four passes for 79 yards and setting up three Oakland scores. Another key play was a 75-yard interception return for a touchdown by Hall of Fame cornerback Willie Brown in the fourth quarter, which put the game completely out of reach. After the game, Madden remarked, "We had tougher games in the AFC than we did today."

=== 1977: "Ghost to the Post" ===
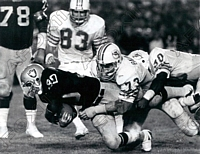
The Raiders hosting the Mami Dolphins at the Oakland Coliseum in 1979

The following season saw the Raiders defeating the Baltimore Colts in the AFC playoffs 37–31 (2 OT) when Errol Mann tied the game with a late field goal, set up by a pass to tight end Dave Casper, a play known as the "Ghost to the Post". In the second overtime, Casper caught a touchdown pass for the victory. The following week, Oakland fell to the Denver Broncos 20–17 in the 1977 AFC Championship Game.

=== 1978: "Holy Roller" ===
With 10 seconds left during a September 10, 1978, matchup with the San Diego Chargers, quarterback Ken Stabler intentionally tossed the ball forward by under handing it; a teammate dove for the ball and shoveled it closer to the end zone. Tight end Dave Casper then kicked the ball to himself in the end zone for a touchdown and a 21–20 Raiders' win. The play, which became known as the "Holy Roller," led to an NFL rule change prohibiting any player besides the fumbler, from the two-minute warning onward, from advancing the ball.

=== 1980: Super Bowl XV champions ===
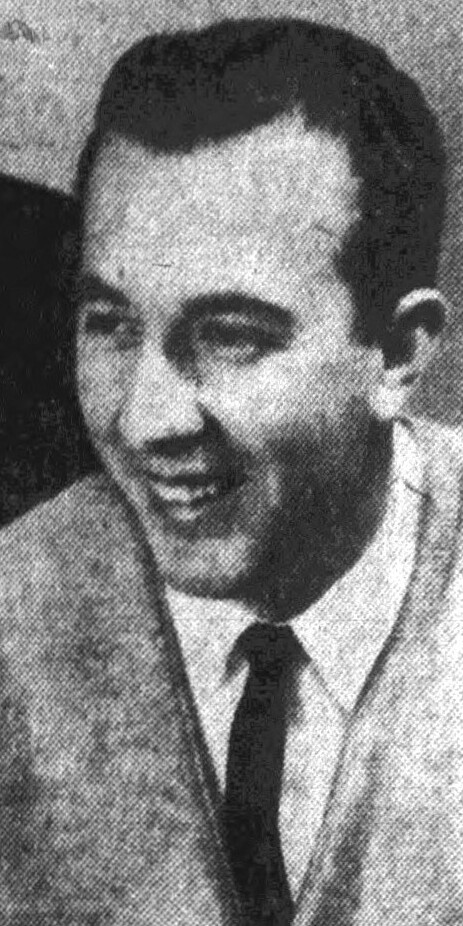
Tom Flores was the Raiders head coach from 1979–1987, winning two Super Bowls: 1980 (XV) and 1983 (XVIII)

After ten consecutive winning seasons and one Super Bowl championship, John Madden left the Raiders (and coaching) in 1979 to pursue a career as a television football commentator. His replacement was former Raiders quarterback Tom Flores, the first Hispanic head coach in NFL history.

==== 11–5 regular season ====
In the midst of the turmoil of Al Davis' attempts to move the team to Los Angeles in 1980, Flores looked to lead the Raiders to their third Super Bowl by finishing the 1980 season 11–5 and earning a wild card berth. Quarterback Jim Plunkett revitalized his career, taking over in week five when starter Dan Pastorini was lost for the season to a broken leg. New acquisition, wide receiver Bob Chandler, contributed by leading the team in receptions (49) and touchdowns (10). The Raiders spent most of the year as a mistake-prone offensive mess. Oakland turned it over 44 times and finished 16th in total yards. Oakland's defense, on the other hand, led the NFL in forced turnovers (52) and interceptions (35). That same season, cornerback Lester Hayes had a standout performance, recording 18 interceptions and 2 defensive touchdowns in 19 games played (including postseason).

==== AFC playoffs and Super Bowl XV ====
After playoff victories against the Houston Oilers 27–7, Cleveland Browns 14–12 (see "Red Right 88"), and San Diego Chargers 34–27 in the 1980 AFC Championship Game, the Raiders went to Super Bowl XV at the Louisiana Superdome. Oakland clinched their second NFL championship in five years with a 27–10 win over the favored Philadelphia Eagles. With the victory, the Raiders became the first ever wild card team to win a Super Bowl. Two Super Bowl records of note occurred in this game: 1) Kenny King's 80-yard, first quarter, catch-and-run reception from Jim Plunkett remained the longest touchdown pass play for the next 16 years; and 2) Rod Martin's three interceptions of Eagles' quarterback Ron Jaworski still stands today as a Super Bowl record. Reflecting on the last ten years during the postgame awards ceremony, Al Davis stated "...this was our finest hour, this was the finest hour in the history of the Oakland Raiders. To Tom Flores, the coaches, and the athletes: you were magnificent out there, you really were."

The team would not see a repeat performance in 1981, falling to 7–9 and a losing record for the first time since 1964.

== Move to Los Angeles (1982–1994) ==
Before the 1980 season, Al Davis attempted unsuccessfully to add luxury boxes to the Oakland–Alameda County Coliseum. On March 1, he signed a memorandum of agreement to move the Raiders from Oakland to Los Angeles. The move, which required three-fourths approval by league owners, was defeated 22–0 (with five owners abstaining). When Davis tried to move the team anyway, he was blocked by an injunction. In response, the Raiders became an partner in an antitrust lawsuit filed by the Los Angeles Memorial Coliseum (which had recently lost the Los Angeles Rams to Anaheim) and filed an antitrust lawsuit of their own. After the first case was declared a mistrial, in May 1982 a second jury found in favor of Davis and the Los Angeles Coliseum, clearing the way for the move. With the ruling, the Raiders finally moved to Los Angeles for the 1982 season to play their home games at the Los Angeles Coliseum. "Sure, I expected the Oakland fans to get angry at me," Davis said. "But I don't remember any of them parading on the Oakland Coliseum, saying 'Give him what he wants.' In their mind, it's their team. In my mind, it's not."

1982 - John “Pete” Madison Broadrick authored “The Mighty Raiders of L.A.” fight song as a submission to Los Angeles local radio station KABC via “The Ken & Bob Company” morning talk show. Broadrick’s song won the radio station’s song contest which was focused on writing a new fight song for the Oakland/Los Angeles Raiders impending move. Broadrick won an all expenses paid vacation to Acapulco and $2,000 cash. Noteworthy, his two son’s Cory and Randy had been avid Oakland Raiders fans since the early 1970’s.

== Second Oakland era (1995–2019) ==
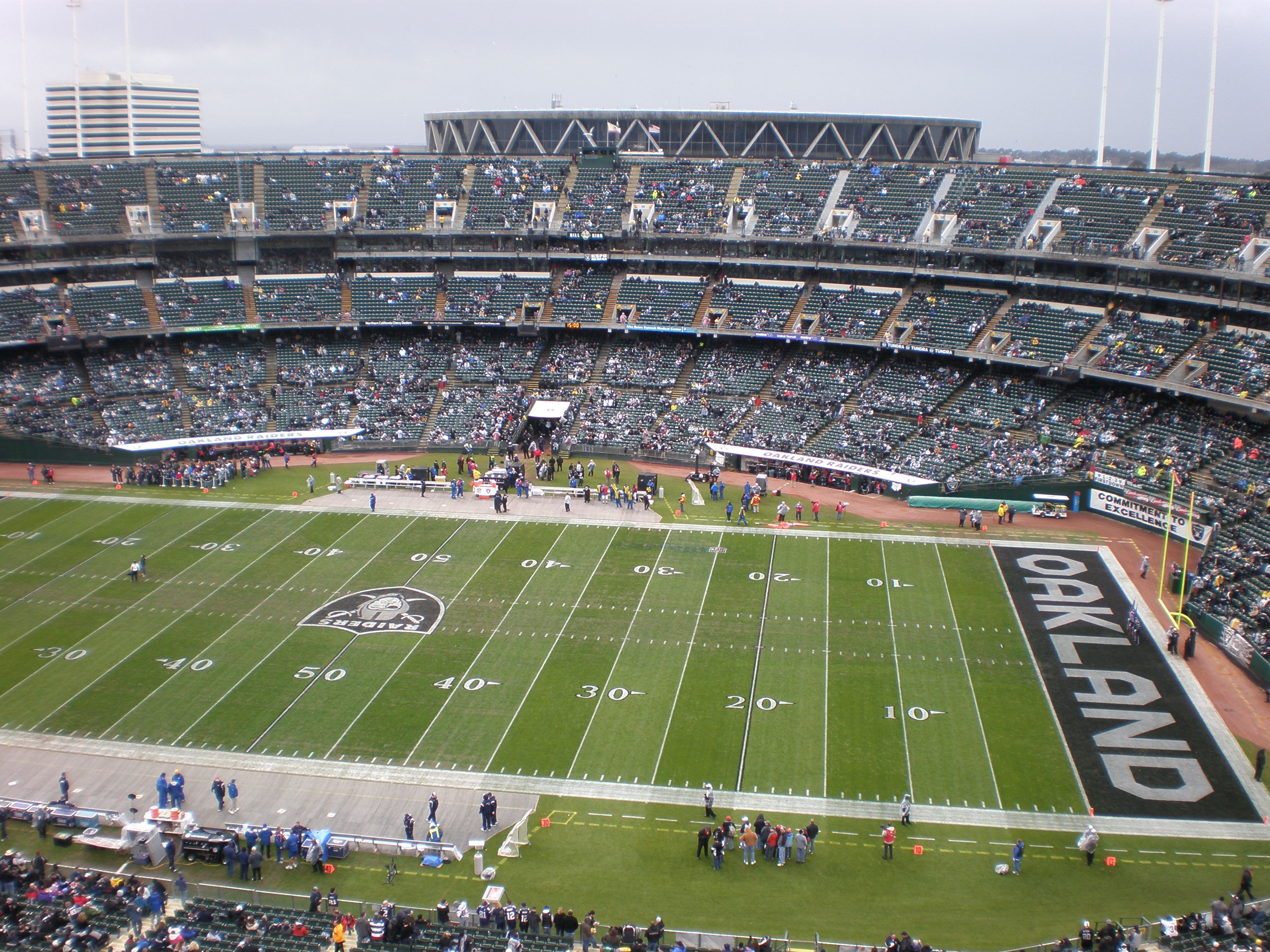
Oakland-Alameda County Coliseum as seen from Mount Davis. The Raiders played at the Coliseum from 1966–1981, and later 1995–2019

On June 23, 1995, Davis signed a letter of intent to move the Raiders back to Oakland. The move was approved by the Alameda County Board of Supervisors the next month, as well as by the NFL. The move was greeted with much fanfare, and under new head coach Mike White the 1995 season started off well for the team. Oakland started 8–2, but injuries to starting quarterback Jeff Hostetler contributed to a six-game losing streak to end the season, and the Raiders failed to qualify for the playoffs for a second consecutive season. As part of the agreement to bring the Raiders back to Oakland the city agreed that they would increase the capacity of the Coliseum. The result was a structure of 20,000 capacity seating that became known as Mount Davis after Davis. The structure was completed in time for the 1996 season.

=== Gruden era (1998–2001) ===
After two more unsuccessful seasons (7–9 in 1996 and 4–12 in 1997) under White and his successor, Joe Bugel, Davis selected a new head coach from outside the Raiders organization for only the second time when he hired Philadelphia Eagles offensive coordinator Jon Gruden, who previously worked for the 49ers and Packers under head coach Mike Holmgren. Under Gruden, the Raiders posted consecutive 8–8 seasons in 1998 and 1999, and climbed out of last place in the AFC West. Oakland finished 12–4 in the 2000 season, the team's most successful in a decade. Led by veteran quarterback Rich Gannon, Oakland won their first division title since 1990, and advanced to the AFC Championship, where they lost 16–3 to the eventual Super Bowl champion Baltimore Ravens.

The Raiders acquired all-time leading wide receiver Jerry Rice before the 2001 season. They finished 10–6 and won a second straight AFC West title but lost their divisional round playoff game to the eventual Super Bowl champion New England Patriots, in a controversial game that became known as the "Tuck Rule Game". The game was played in a heavy snowstorm, and late in the fourth quarter an apparent fumble by Patriots quarterback Tom Brady was recovered by Raiders middle linebacker Greg Biekert. The recovery would have led to a Raiders victory; however, the play was reviewed and determined to be an incomplete pass (it was ruled that Brady had pump faked and then "tucked" the ball into his body, which, by rule, cannot result in a fumble – though this explanation was not given on the field, but after the NFL season had ended). The Patriots retained possession of the ball, and drove for a game-tying field goal. The game went into overtime and the Patriots won, 16–13.

=== Callahan era and Super Bowl XXXVII appearance (2002–2003) ===
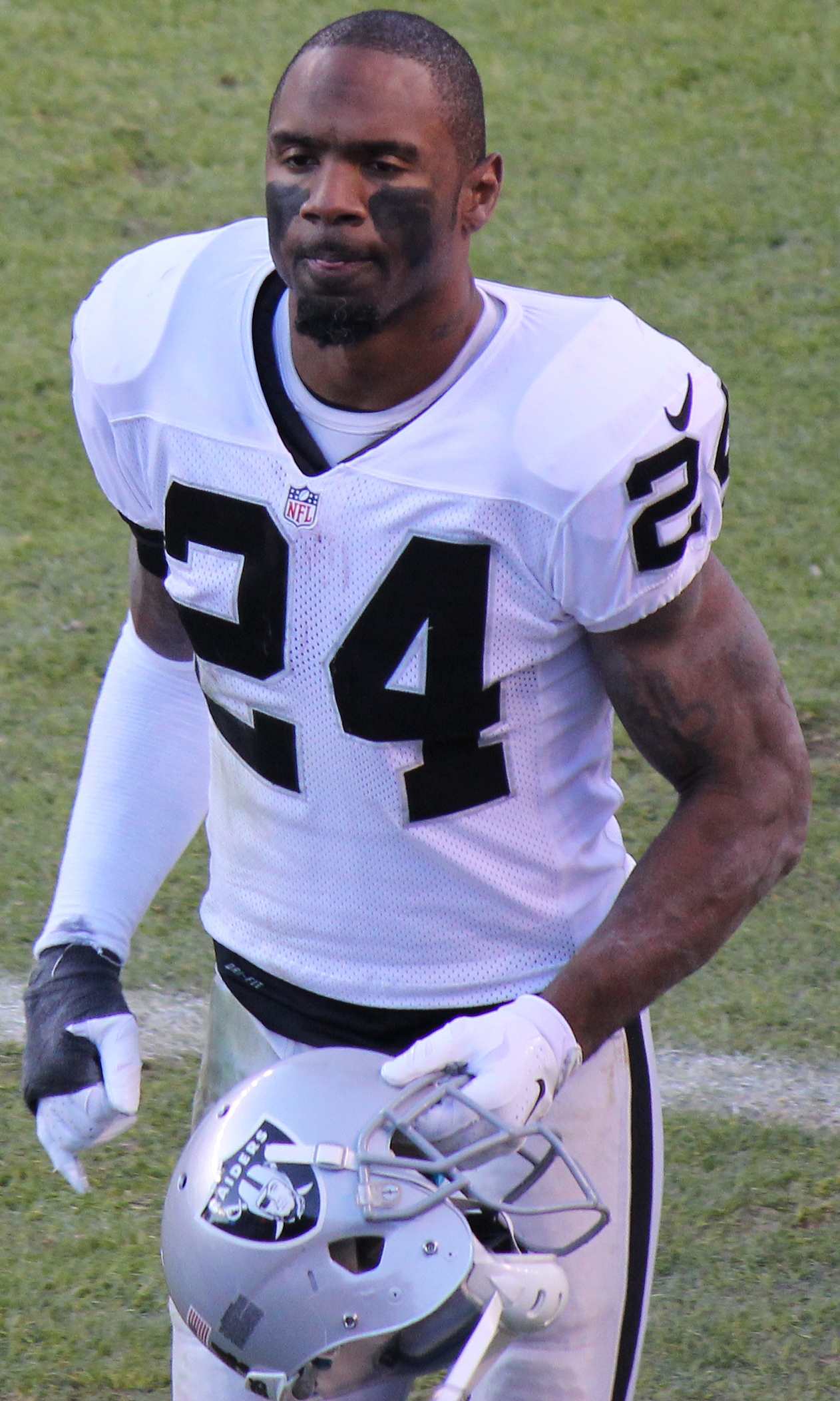
Hall of Fame cornerback Charles Woodson played in Oakland from 1998 to 2005; 2013 to 2015

Shortly after the 2001 season, the Raiders made an unusual move that involved releasing Gruden from his contract and allowing the Tampa Bay Buccaneers to sign him. In return, the Raiders received cash and future draft picks from the Buccaneers. The sudden move came after months of speculation in the media that Davis and Gruden had fallen out with each other both personally and professionally. Bill Callahan, who served as the team's offensive coordinator and offensive line coach during Gruden's tenure, was named head coach.

Under Callahan, the Raiders finished the 2002 season 11–5, won their third straight division title, and clinched the top seed in the playoffs. Quarterback Rich Gannon was named NFL MVP after passing for a league-high 4,689 yards. In the third quarter of Oakland's 26–20 win on Monday Night Football over the Jets, Hall of Fame wide receiver Tim Brown became the third player in NFL history with 1,000 career catches. Multi-talented running back Charlie Garner was the team's leading rusher with 962 yards and seven touchdowns, while also leading all NFL running backs in receiving with 91 receptions for 941 yards and another four touchdowns. After beating the New York Jets and Tennessee Titans by large margins (combined score of 71–34) in the AFC playoffs, the Raiders made their fifth Super Bowl appearance in Super Bowl XXXVII at San Diego Stadium. Their opponent was the Tampa Bay Buccaneers, coached by Gruden. The Raiders, who had not made significant changes to Gruden's offensive schemes, were intercepted five times by the Buccaneers en route to a 48–21 blowout. Some Tampa Bay players claimed that Gruden had given them so much information on Oakland's offense, they knew exactly what plays were being called.

Callahan's second season as head coach was considerably less successful. Oakland finished 4–12, their worst showing since 1997. After a late-season loss to the Denver Broncos, a visibly frustrated Callahan exclaimed, "We've got to be the dumbest team in America in terms of playing the game." At the end of the 2003 regular season, Callahan was fired and replaced by former Washington Redskins head coach Norv Turner.

=== Coaching carousel and consecutive eleven-loss seasons (2004–2009) ===
The team's fortunes did not improve in Turner's first year. Oakland finished the 2004 season 5–11, with only one divisional win (a one-point victory over the Broncos in Denver). During a Week 3 victory against the Buccaneers, Rich Gannon suffered a neck injury that ended his season and eventually his career; he never returned to the team and retired before the 2005 season. Kerry Collins, who led the New York Giants to an appearance in Super Bowl XXXV and signed with Oakland after the 2003 season, became the team's starting quarterback.

In an effort to bolster their offense, in early 2005 the Raiders acquired Pro Bowl wide receiver Randy Moss via trade with the Minnesota Vikings, and signed free agent running back Lamont Jordan of the New York Jets. After a 4–12 season and a second consecutive last place finish, Turner was fired as head coach. On February 11, 2006, the team announced the return of Art Shell as head coach. In announcing the move, Al Davis said that firing Shell in 1995 had been a mistake.

Under Shell, the Raiders lost their first five games in 2006 en route to a 2–14 finish, the team's worst record since 1962. Oakland's offense struggled greatly, scoring just 168 points (fewest in franchise history) and allowing 72 sacks. Wide receiver Jerry Porter was benched by Shell for most of the season in what many viewed as a personal, rather than football-related, decision. The Raiders also earned the right to the first overall pick in the 2007 NFL draft for the first time since 1962, by virtue of having the league's worst record.

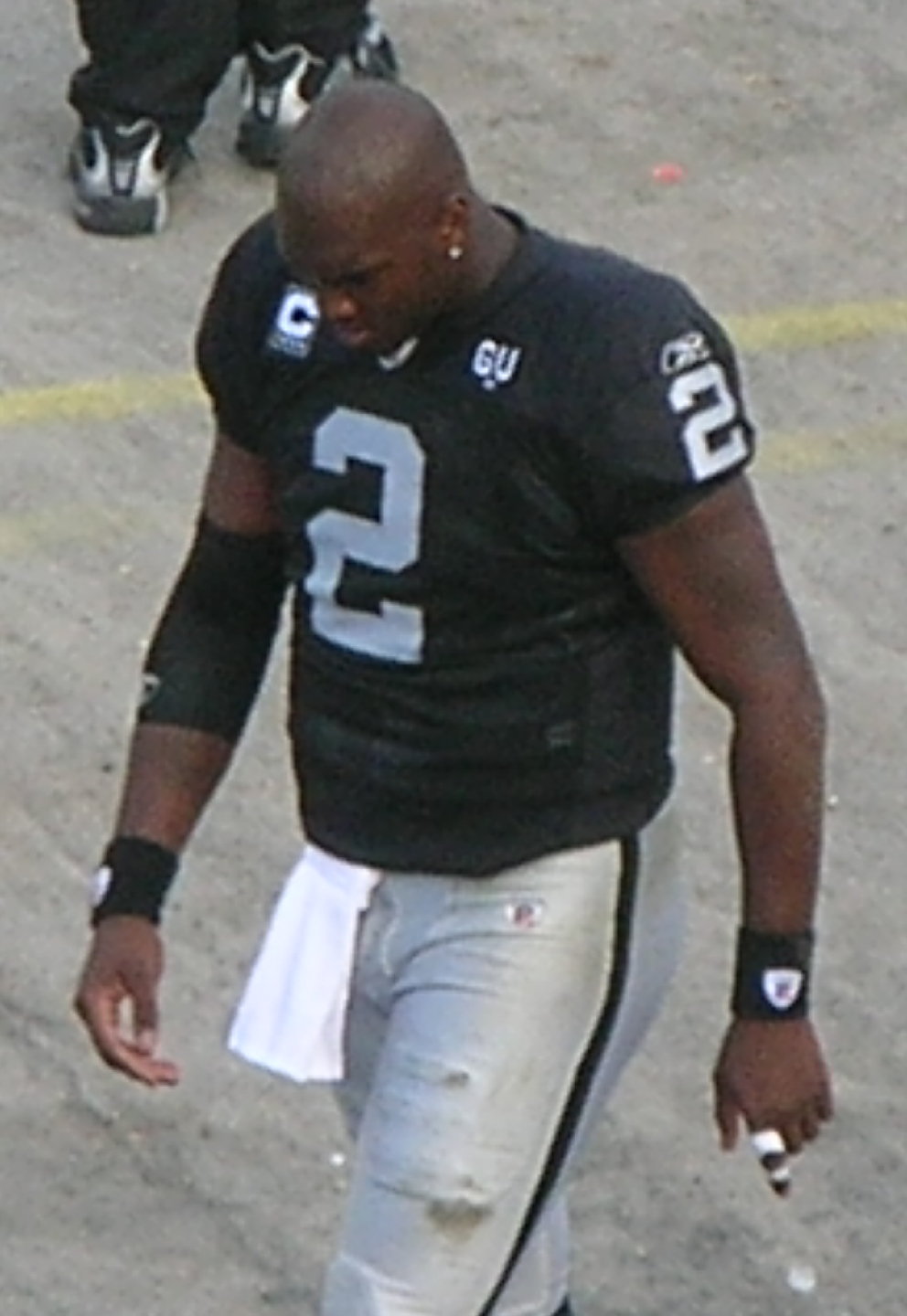
Quarterback JaMarcus Russell, selected first overall in 2007, was a major disappointment.

One season into his second run as head coach, Shell was fired on January 4, 2007. On January 22, the team announced the hiring of 31-year-old USC offensive coordinator Lane Kiffin, the youngest coach in franchise history and the youngest coach in the NFL. In the 2007 NFL Draft, the Raiders selected LSU quarterback JaMarcus Russell with the #1 overall pick. Kiffin coached the Raiders to a 4–12 record in the 2007 season. After a 1–3 start to 2008 and months of speculation and rumors, Al Davis fired Kiffin on September 30, 2008. Tom Cable was named as his interim replacement, and officially signed as the 17th head coach of the Oakland Raiders on February 3, 2009.

At the end of their 2009 campaign, the Raiders became the first team in NFL history to lose at least 11 games in seven straight seasons.

=== Al Davis's final years (2010–2011) ===
In 2010, the Raiders became the first team in NFL history to go undefeated against their division yet miss the playoffs (6–0 in the AFC West, 8–8 overall, 3 games behind the Jets for the second Wild Card entry). On January 4, 2011, owner Al Davis informed head coach Tom Cable that his contract would not be renewed, ending his tenure with the organization.

Al Davis, who was now past his 80th birthday and in increasingly poor health, refused to hire a general manager or relinquish his absolute control of the team's on-field activities and he continued to make all major decisions regarding draft picks, trades, or signings himself. Davis was criticized for clinging to outdated player evaluation philosophies, sometimes overlooking talented players who didn't fit his traditional mold. His teams in the 2000s often struggled to navigate the complexities of the NFL's salary cap, leading to roster instability and a lack of competitive depth. Critics argued that Davis didn't prioritize investing in high-quality training facilities, which could have helped the Raiders attract and develop talent.

On January 17, 2011, it was announced that offensive coordinator Hue Jackson was going to be the next Raiders head coach. A press conference was held on January 18, 2011, to formally introduce Jackson as the next Raiders head coach, the fifth in just seven years. Following Davis's death during the 2011 season, new owners Carol and Mark Davis decided to take the franchise in a drastically different direction by hiring a general manager. In Week 17, the Raiders played the San Diego Chargers, hoping to go to the playoffs for the first time since 2002, the game ended with a 38–26 loss. Their season ended with another disappointing 8–8 record.

=== The Dennis Allen years (2012–2014) ===
The Raiders named Reggie McKenzie as the team's first general manager since Al Davis on January 6, 2012. On January 24, 2012, McKenzie hired Dennis Allen as the team's 18th head coach. He was the first Raiders defensive head coach since John Madden's retirement after the 1978 season.

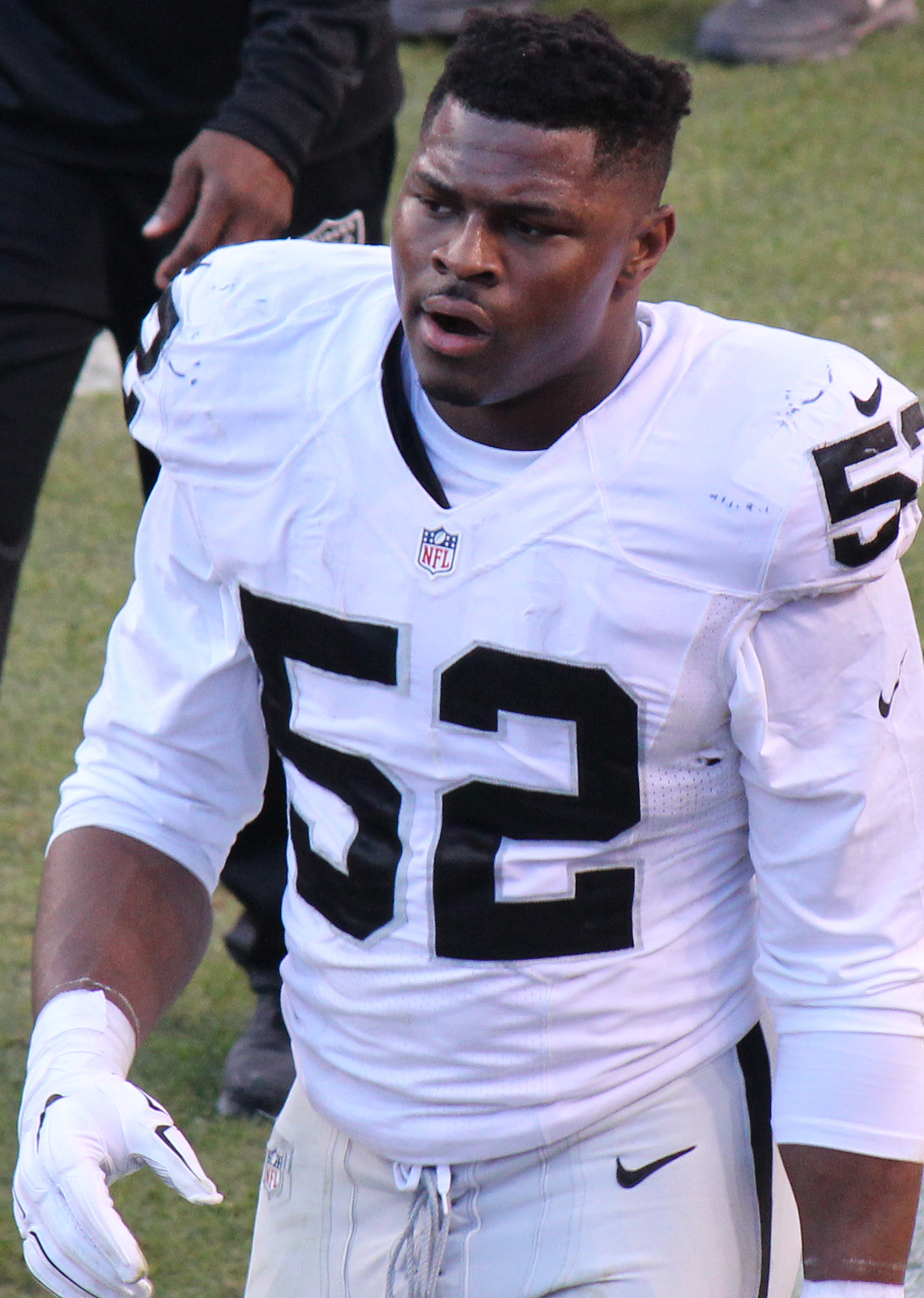
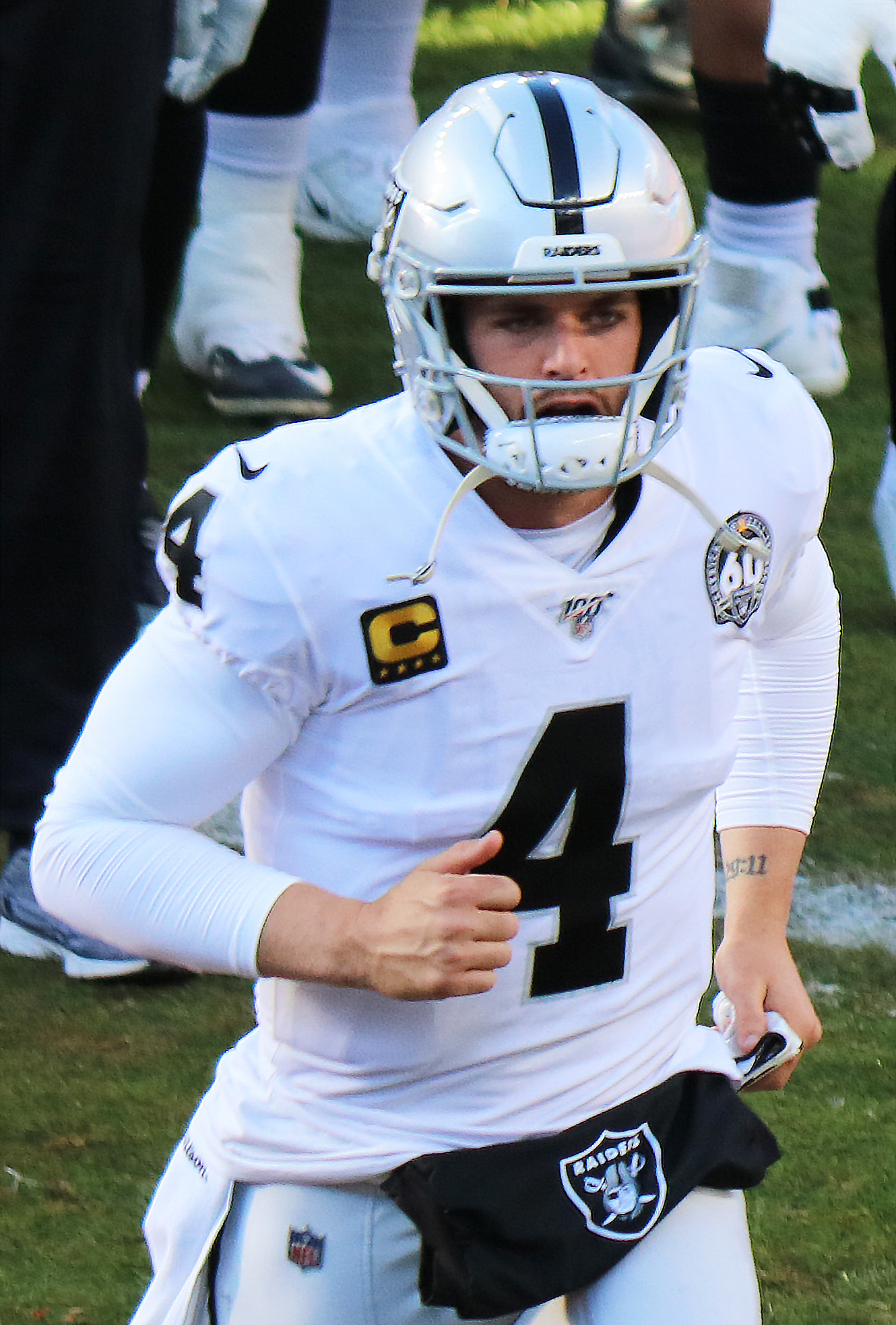
2014 draft picks Khalil Mack (top) and Derek Carr (bottom) helped lead the Raiders back to respectability for a few years.

At the time of Al Davis's death, the Oakland Raiders faced a challenging situation characterized by a lack of salary cap space, and a history of seemingly misspent first-round draft picks on players like Robert Gallery, Darrius Heyward-Bey, and JaMarcus Russell. This led to a struggling franchise with a roster of aging players and a perceived lack of future talent. Surveys of players across the league consistently showed that the Raiders had become one of the least desirable teams to play for. In addition, with the Miami Marlins obtaining their own ballpark in 2012, the Raiders became the last team in the NFL to still share a stadium with a Major League Baseball (MLB) franchise. The end of the Oakland Athletics season correlated with the beginning of the NFL season, which forced the Raiders to play certain games on infield dirt.

In the 2014 NFL draft, the Raiders selected linebacker Khalil Mack in the first round and quarterback Derek Carr in the second round hoping each would anchor their side of the ball. Carr was given control early as he was chosen as the starter for the opener of the 2014 season. After an 0–4 start to the 2014 season, and an 8–28 overall record as head coach, Allen was fired. Offensive line coach Tony Sparano was named interim head coach on September 30. The Raiders finished the 2014 season with a record of 3–13. Carr started all 16 games for the Raiders, the first Raider since 2002 to do so. First-round pick Mack finished third in Defensive Rookie of the Year voting.

=== Jack Del Rio (2015–2017) ===
On January 14, 2015, Jack Del Rio, the then-Denver Broncos defensive coordinator and former Jacksonville Jaguars head coach, was hired by the Oakland Raiders to be their new head coach. Del Rio's new coaching staff included former Minnesota Vikings offensive coordinator Bill Musgrave as offensive coordinator and former Vikings head coach Mike Tice as offensive line coach.

The Raiders showed great improvement in Del Rio's first season, improving upon their three-win 2014 season, going 7–9 in the 2015 season. Rookie wide receiver Amari Cooper fulfilled almost all expectations, and Derek Carr continued his improvement at quarterback. Cooper, Mack, Murray, and Carr were selected to participate in the Pro Bowl. Defensive end Khalil Mack was the first player ever to be selected as an AP 2015 All-Pro Team at two positions in the same year.

In 2016, the team finished 12–4, clinching their first postseason berth since 2002 with strong play on both offense and defense, but lost Derek Carr and backup Matt McGloin to season-ending injuries to close out the year. The Raiders lost to the Houston Texans 27–14 in the AFC Wild Card.

Before the 2017 season, the Raiders signed quarterback Derek Carr to a then-NFL record contract extension of five years, $125 million. Following their first trip to the playoffs in 14 years, the Raiders expected bigger things in 2017, with a return to the playoffs seeming likely. The Raiders defense struggled mightily on the year under Ken Norton Jr., but later improved with John Pagano as the defensive coordinator and the Raiders offense could not return to its previous year's form under first-year offensive coordinator Todd Downing. After winning the first two games of the season, the Raiders lost four straight and six of their next eight leaving them two games below .500 with six games remaining. They would win their next two games, but lose their final four games, ending the season a disappointing 6–10. On December 31, 2017, following a loss to the Chargers in Week 17, head coach Del Rio was fired by Mark Davis after being granted a four-year contract extension before the season.

=== Return of Jon Gruden and the end of the Oakland Raiders (2018–2019) ===
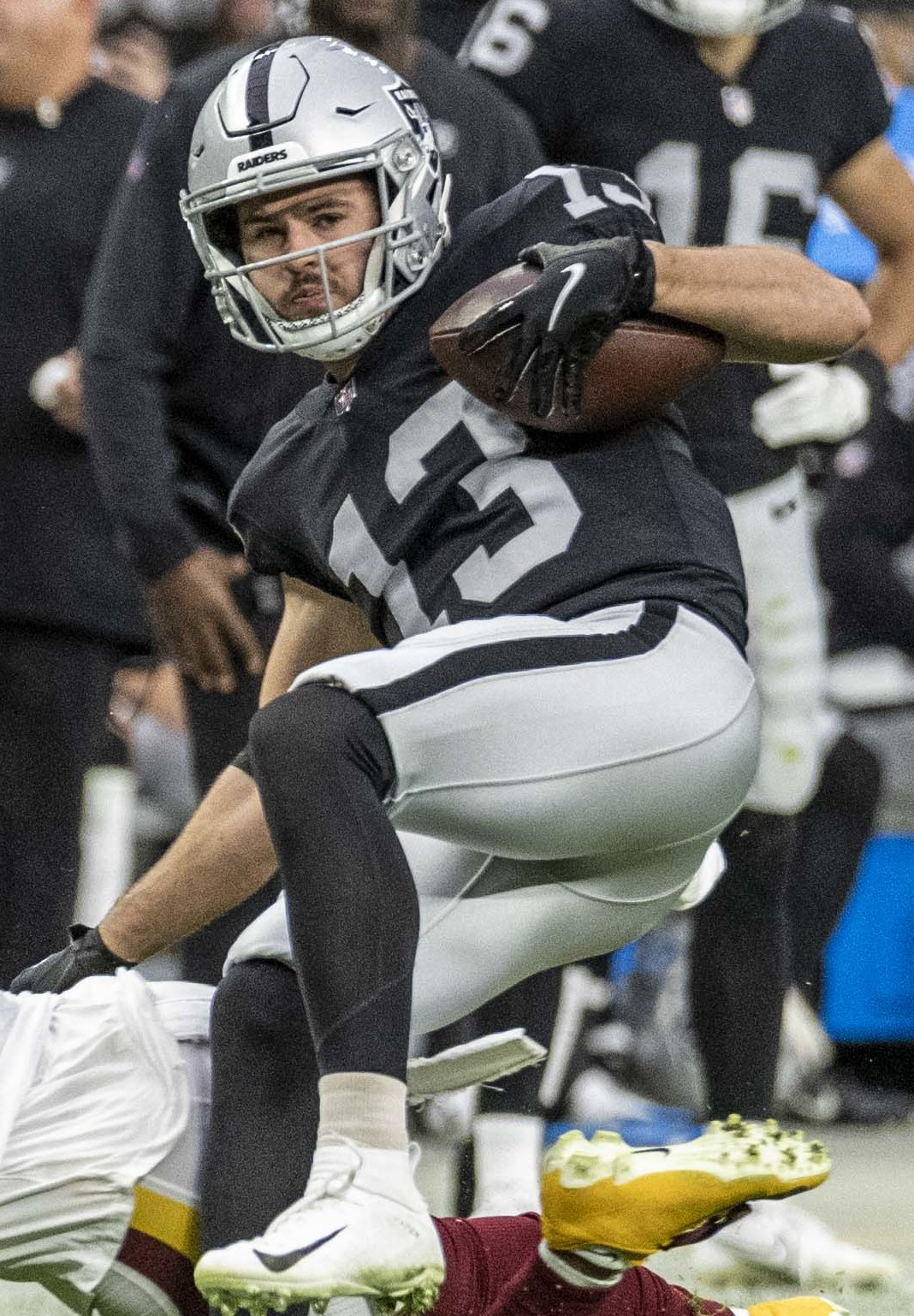
WR Hunter Renfrow

On January 6, 2018, the team announced the return of Jon Gruden as head coach. Gruden returned to the Raiders and coaching after a nine-year stint with ESPN serving as analyst for Monday Night Football. Davis, who had reportedly been wanting to hire Gruden for six years, gave Gruden a 10-year contract worth an estimated $100 million. One of the first major moves of the second Gruden era was a blockbuster trade that sent Khalil Mack who was holding out for a new contract to the Chicago Bears for two first-round draft picks, and later sent Amari Cooper to the Dallas Cowboys for another first-round draft pick.

During the 2018 season the Raiders fired general manager Reggie McKenzie, replacing him with NFL Network's draft expert Mike Mayock for the 2019 season. The Raiders finished 4–12 and in last place in the AFC West for the first time since 2014. The next year, in what would be the last season of the team's second tenure in Oakland, the team posted a three-game turnaround with a 7–9 record. Wide receiver Antonio Brown was released before the start of the regular season due to conduct detrimental to the team, including a heated argument with general manager Mayock. December 29, 2019 would be the Raiders' final game as an Oakland-based franchise, losing 16–15 to the Denver Broncos, eliminating them from playoff contention.

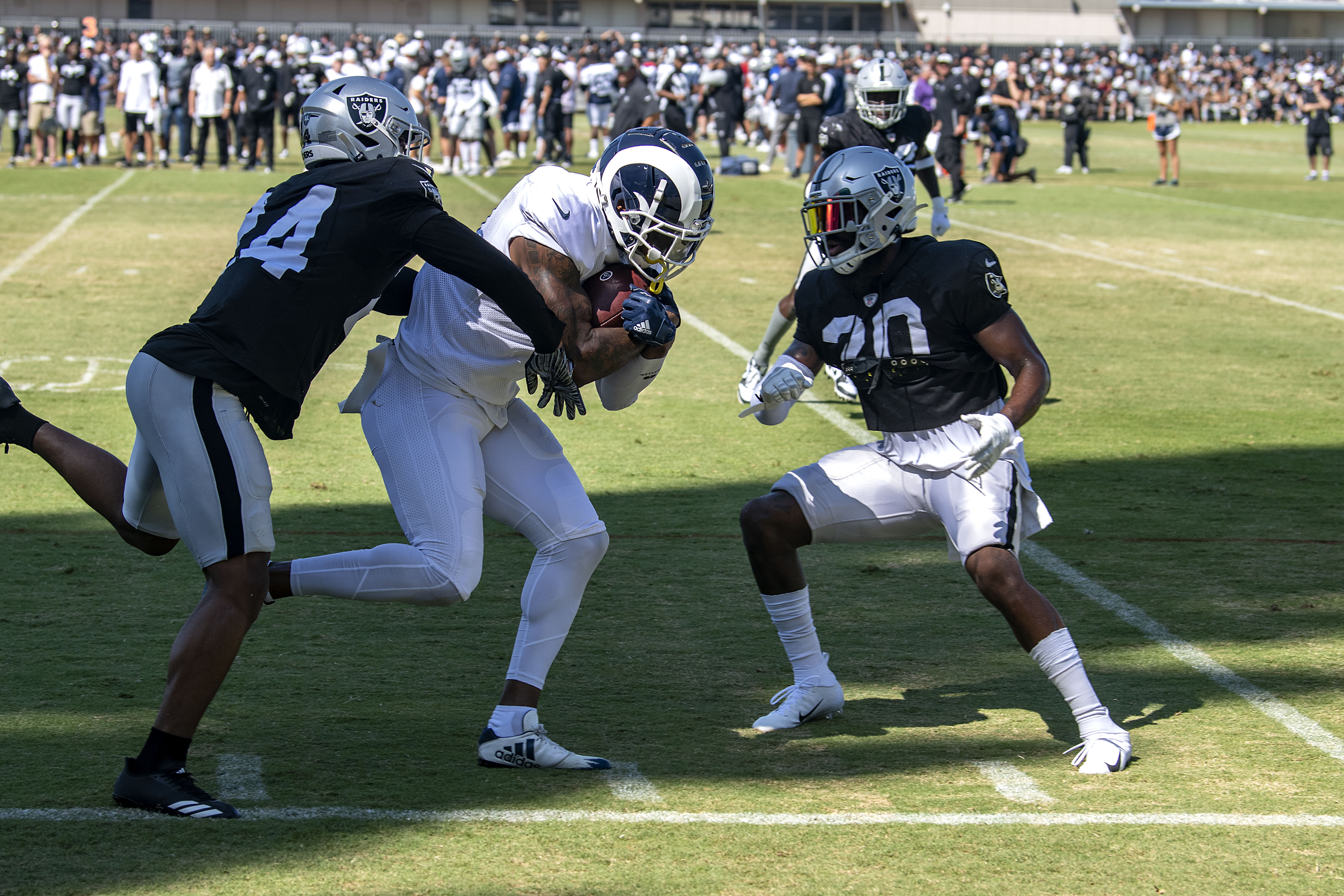
Oakland Raiders cornerbacks tackling a Los Angeles Rams receiver in a joint practice during the 2019 training camp.

== Move to Las Vegas (2020–present) ==
The day following the conclusion of the 2015 regular season, the Raiders, St. Louis Rams, and San Diego Chargers all filed to move to Los Angeles. On January 12, 2016, the NFL owners voted 30–2 to allow the Rams to return to Los Angeles and approved a stadium project in Inglewood proposed by Rams owner Stan Kroenke over a competing project in Carson that the Chargers and Raiders had jointly proposed. The Chargers were given a one-year approval to move as well, conditioned on negotiating a lease agreement with the Rams or an agreement to partner with the Rams on the new stadium construction. The Raiders were given conditional permission to move if the Chargers were to decline their option first.

As part of the Rams' decision to move, the NFL offered to provide both the Chargers and Raiders $100 million each if they could work out new stadiums in their home markets. The Chargers eventually announced on January 12, 2017, that they would exercise their option to move to Los Angeles after the failure of a November 2016 ballot initiative to fund a new stadium in San Diego. In an official statement on the Rams decision, the Raiders offered they would "now turn our attention to exploring all options to find a permanent stadium solution." Las Vegas and San Antonio were heavily rumored as possible destinations. By mid-February 2016, the team had worked out a one-year lease agreement with the City of Oakland to play at O.co Coliseum with the option for a second one-year lease.

In late January 2016 billionaire Sheldon Adelson, president and CEO of the Las Vegas Sands Corporation casino empire, proposed a new domed stadium (Allegiant Stadium) in Las Vegas to house the University of Nevada, Las Vegas football team and a possible NFL team. Adelson quickly reached out to the Raiders to discuss working together on the new stadium. In April 2016, without promising the team would move, Raiders owner Mark Davis met with the Southern Nevada Tourism Infrastructure Committee and pledged $500 million toward Adelson's stadium if public officials agreed to contribute to the stadium.

A group of investors led by former NFL stars Ronnie Lott and Rodney Peete proposed a new stadium to the City of Oakland in June 2016 as a way to keep the Raiders in the city.

Nevada's legislature approved a $750 million public subsidy for the proposed domed Las Vegas stadium in October 2016. Davis informed his fellow NFL owners that he intended to file for a move to Las Vegas following the end of the season.

After over 10 years of failure to secure a new stadium in Oakland to replace the decaying Coliseum—whose problems included sewage backups and flooding—and after missing out on Los Angeles, on March 27, 2017, the NFL granted the team permission to move to Las Vegas, Nevada by a 31–1 vote, pending the new Allegiant Stadium's completion. The Raiders soon announced plans to stay in Oakland until the new stadium was completed in 2020. Ground was broken on the new stadium on November 13, 2017.

== Championships ==
=== Super Bowl championships ===
During their tenure in Oakland from 1960–1981, and later 1995–2019, the Raiders won two Super Bowl championships:

Season	Coach	Super Bowl	Location	Opponent	Score
1976	John Madden	XI	Rose Bowl	Minnesota Vikings	32–14
1980	Tom Flores	XV	Louisiana Superdome	Philadelphia Eagles	27–10
Total Super Bowls won: 2					

=== AFL / AFC championships ===
Season	Coach	Location	Opponent	Score
1967	John Rauch	Oakland-Alameda County Coliseum	Houston Oilers	40–7
1976	John Madden	Oakland-Alameda County Coliseum	Pittsburgh Steelers	24–7
1980	Tom Flores	Jack Murphy Stadium	San Diego Chargers	34–27
2002	Bill Callahan	Oakland-Alameda County Coliseum	Tennessee Titans	41–24
Total AFL / AFC Championships won: 4				

== Seasons ==
AFL champions (1960–1969)^{§}	Super Bowl champions (1966–present)^{†}	Conference champions^{*}	Division champions^{+}	Wild Card berth^{#}

Las Vegas Raiders seasonal records
Season	Team	League	Conference	Division	Regular season				Postseason results	Awards	Head coaches	Refs.
Season	Team	League	Conference	Division	Finish	W	L	T	Postseason results	Awards	Head coaches	Refs.
Oakland Raiders (1960–1981)
1960	1960	AFL		Western	3rd	6	8	0			Eddie Erdelatz	
1961	1961	AFL		Western	4th	2	12	0			Eddie Erdelatz (0–2); Marty Feldman (2–10)	
1962	1962	AFL		Western	4th	1	13	0			Marty Feldman (0–5); Red Conkright (1–8)	
1963	1963	AFL		Western	2nd	10	4	0			Al Davis	
1964	1964	AFL		Western	3rd	5	7	2			Al Davis	
1965	1965	AFL		Western	2nd	8	5	1			Al Davis	
1966	1966	AFL		Western	2nd	8	5	1			John Rauch	
1967	1967	AFL^{§}		Western^{^}	1st^{^}	13	1	0	Won AFL Championship (Oilers) 40–7; Lost Super Bowl II (vs. Packers) 14–33	Daryle Lamonica (MVP)	John Rauch	
1968	1968	AFL		Western^{^}	1st^{^}	12	2	0	Won Divisional playoff (Chiefs) 41–6; Lost AFL Championship (at Jets) 23–27		John Rauch	
1969	1969	AFL		Western^{^}	1st^{^}	12	1	1	Won Divisional playoffs (Oilers) 56–7; Lost AFL Championship (Chiefs) 7–17	Daryle Lamonica (MVP)	John Madden	
1970	1970	NFL	AFC	West^{^}	1st^{^}	8	4	2	Won Divisional playoffs (Dolphins) 21–14; Lost AFC Championship (at Colts) 17–27		John Madden	
1971	1971	NFL	AFC	West	2nd	8	4	2			John Madden	
1972	1972	NFL	AFC	West^{^}	1st^{^}	10	3	1	Lost Divisional playoffs (at Steelers) 7–13		John Madden	
1973	1973	NFL	AFC	West^{^}	1st^{^}	9	4	1	Won Divisional playoffs (Steelers) 33–14; Lost AFC Championship (at Dolphins) 10–27		John Madden	
1974	1974	NFL	AFC	West^{^}	1st^{^}	12	2	0	Won Divisional playoffs (Dolphins) 28–26; Lost AFC Championship (Steelers) 13–24	Ken Stabler (MVP, OPOY)	John Madden	
1975	1975	NFL	AFC	West^{^}	1st^{^}	11	3	0	Won Divisional playoffs (Bengals) 31–28; Lost AFC Championship (at Steelers) 10–16		John Madden	
1976	1976	NFL^{†}	AFC^{*}	West^{^}	1st^{^}	13	1	0	Won Divisional playoffs (Patriots) 24–21; Won AFC Championship (Steelers) 24–7; Won Super Bowl XI (1) (vs. Vikings) 32–14	Fred Biletnikoff (SB MVP)	John Madden	
1977	1977	NFL	AFC	West	2nd^{#}	11	3	0	Won Divisional playoffs (at Colts) 37–31 (2 OT); Lost AFC Championship (at Broncos) 17–20		John Madden	
1978	1978	NFL	AFC	West	2nd	9	7	0			John Madden	
1979	1979	NFL	AFC	West	4th	9	7	0			Tom Flores	
1980	1980	NFL^{†}	AFC^{*}	West	2nd^{#}	11	5	0	Won Wild Card playoffs (Oilers) 27–7; Won Divisional playoffs (at Browns) 14–12; Won AFC Championship (at Chargers) 34–27; Won Super Bowl XV (2) (vs. Eagles) 27–10	Lester Hayes (DPOY); Jim Plunkett (CBPOY, SB MVP)	Tom Flores	
1981	1981	NFL	AFC	West	4th	7	9	0			Tom Flores	
Oakland Raiders (1995–2019)
1995	1995	NFL	AFC	West	5th	8	8	0			Mike White	
1996	1996	NFL	AFC	West	4th	7	9	0			Mike White	
1997	1997	NFL	AFC	West	4th	4	12	0			Joe Bugel	
1998	1998	NFL	AFC	West	2nd	8	8	0		Charles Woodson (DROY)	Jon Gruden	
1999	1999	NFL	AFC	West	3rd	8	8	0			Jon Gruden	
2000	2000	NFL	AFC	West^{^}	1st^{^}	12	4	0	Won Divisional playoffs (Dolphins) 27–0; Lost AFC Championship (Ravens) 3–16		Jon Gruden	
2001	2001	NFL	AFC	West^{^}	1st^{^}	10	6	0	Won Wild Card playoffs (Jets) 38–24; Lost Divisional playoffs (at Patriots) 13–16 (OT)		Jon Gruden	
2002	2002	NFL	AFC^{*}	West^{^}	1st^{^}	11	5	0	Won Divisional playoffs (Jets) 30–10; Won AFC Championship (Titans) 41–24; Lost Super Bowl XXXVII (vs. Buccaneers) 21–48	Rich Gannon (MVP)	Bill Callahan	
2003	2003	NFL	AFC	West	3rd	4	12	0			Bill Callahan	
2004	2004	NFL	AFC	West	4th	5	11	0			Norv Turner	
2005	2005	NFL	AFC	West	4th	4	12	0			Norv Turner	
2006	2006	NFL	AFC	West	4th	2	14	0			Art Shell	
2007	2007	NFL	AFC	West	4th	4	12	0			Lane Kiffin	
2008	2008	NFL	AFC	West	3rd	5	11	0			Lane Kiffin (1–3); Tom Cable (4–8)	
2009	2009	NFL	AFC	West	3rd	5	11	0			Tom Cable	
2010	2010	NFL	AFC	West	3rd	8	8	0			Tom Cable	
2011	2011	NFL	AFC	West	3rd	8	8	0			Hue Jackson	
2012	2012	NFL	AFC	West	3rd	4	12	0			Dennis Allen	
2013	2013	NFL	AFC	West	4th	4	12	0			Dennis Allen	
2014	2014	NFL	AFC	West	4th	3	13	0			Dennis Allen (0–4); Tony Sparano (3–9)	
2015	2015	NFL	AFC	West	3rd	7	9	0			Jack Del Rio	
2016	2016	NFL	AFC	West	2nd^{#}	12	4	0	Lost Wild Card playoffs (at Texans) 14–27	Khalil Mack (DPOY)	Jack Del Rio	
2017	2017	NFL	AFC	West	3rd	6	10	0			Jack Del Rio	
2018	2018	NFL	AFC	West	4th	4	12	0			Jon Gruden	
2019	2019	NFL	AFC	West	3rd	7	9	0			Jon Gruden	
