= The Sea of Hands =

Play during the 1974–75 NFL playoffs

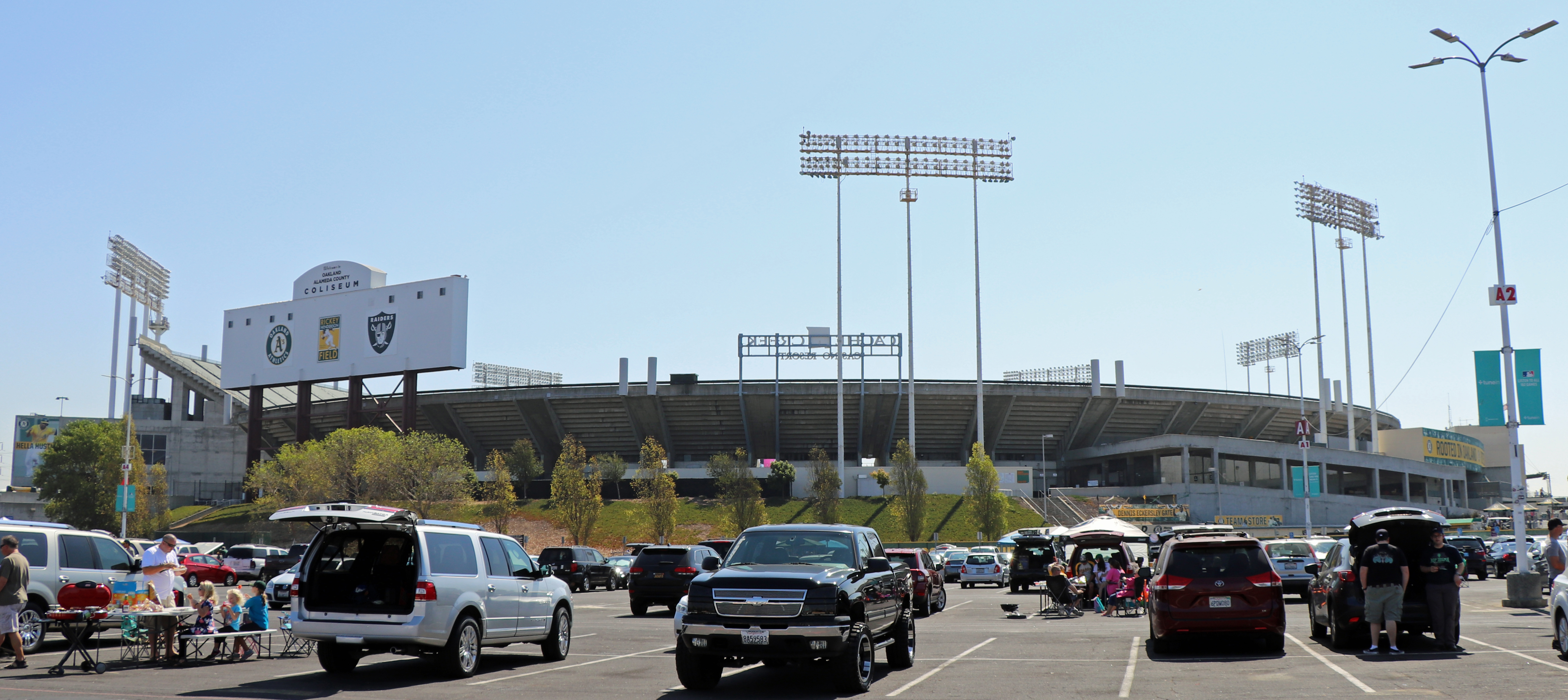
- The game was played at the Oakland–Alameda County Coliseum in Oakland, California
Miami Dolphins (11–3)	Oakland Raiders (12–2)
26	28
Head coach: Don Shula	Head coach: John Madden
	1	2	3	4	Total
MIA	7	3	6	10	26
OAK	0	7	7	14	28
- Date: December 21, 1974
- Stadium: Oakland Alameda County Coliseum; Oakland, California
- Referee: Ben Dreith
- Attendance: 53,023

TV in the United States
- Network: NBC
- Announcers: Curt Gowdy, Al DeRogatis and Don Meredith

The Sea of Hands refers to a significant play during the 1974–75 NFL playoffs. The Miami Dolphins were facing the Oakland Raiders in an American Football Conference (AFC) Divisional playoff game on December 21, 1974 at Oakland–Alameda County Coliseum. The game was ultimately decided in the final seconds by a now-iconic play in which Oakland quarterback Ken Stabler launched an 8-yard touchdown pass to running back Clarence Davis, who seemed tightly covered but somehow wrestled the ball away from multiple Miami defenders to secure victory for the Raiders, thus ending Miami's historic run of Super Bowl appearances.

== Game synopsis ==
The game began when rookie receiver Nat Moore returned the opening kickoff 89 yards for a Miami touchdown. Miami defensive back Dick Anderson then intercepted a pass from Stabler, and it looked like Miami might put things away early. However, fellow safety Jake Scott was hurt on the play and would miss the rest of the game. Oakland's defense made a stand to force a punt, and the Raiders would subsequently tie the game on a Stabler 31-yard touchdown pass to Charlie Smith. Scoring was otherwise limited in the first two quarters, with only a 33-yard field goal by Miami's Garo Yepremian breaking the tie before the half.

The Raiders scored on their opening drive of the third quarter when Stabler hit Fred Biletnikoff for a 13-yard touchdown pass, Biletnikoff managing to haul in the ball with one arm along the right sideline and barely tapping his feet in bounds through tight coverage by cornerback Tim Foley, giving Oakland a 14–10 lead. Aided by a 29-yard pass interference penalty against the Raiders, Miami struck back with Bob Griese's 16-yard touchdown pass to Paul Warfield. Oakland lineman Bubba Smith blocked the extra point attempt, keeping the Miami lead at just 2 points, 16–14.

Early in the fourth quarter, Yepremian increased Miami's lead to 19–14 with a 46-yard field goal. Later in the period, Oakland got the ball on their own 17-yard line. Stabler started the drive with an 11-yard completion to Biletnikoff. On the next play, he threw to Cliff Branch at the Miami 27-yard line. Branch made a spectacular diving catch and, as no Dolphins defender touched him while he was down, got back up and ran to the end zone for a 72-yard touchdown, giving the Raiders a 21–19 lead with 4:37 left in the game. However, with 2:08 left to play, the Dolphins took a 26–21 lead when a 68-yard, 4-play drive ended with Benny Malone's 23-yard touchdown run. Malone evaded four tackle attempts by Raider defenders Skip Thomas, Jack Tatum, George Atkinson and Art Thoms on the way to the end zone.

Following a 20-yard kickoff return by Ron Smith, the Raiders had the ball on their own 32-yard line with 2:00 left to play and all three timeouts left. After a 6-yard completion to tight end Bob Moore and a short run, Stabler twice went long to Biletnikoff, for gains of 18 and 20 yards. After a 4-yard catch by Branch, Frank Pitts made a bobbling first down catch at the Dolphins 14-yard line. Clarence Davis then ran the ball 6 yards to the 8-yard line, where the Raiders called their final timeout. On the next play, Stabler dropped back to pass and looked for Biletnikoff in the end zone, but Biletnikoff was blanketed. With Miami's Vern Den Herder dragging him down from behind, Stabler heaved a desperation toss into a "sea of hands" in the left side of the end zone, where Davis fought his way through three Dolphins defenders to make the catch, enduring a very late hit by Miami's Manny Fernandez to hold on to the ball for a touchdown.

The Dolphins got the ball back on the kickoff with 21 seconds left, now trailing 28–26, but Griese would be intercepted by Oakland linebacker Phil Villapiano, allowing the Raiders to run out the clock.

== Significance of the game ==
Before the game, analysts were referring to the matchup of the Dolphins and Raiders as “Super Bowl Eight-and-a-Half,” since the winner was widely expected to advance to (and possibly win) Super Bowl IX. The expectations were understandable: The Raiders had gone 12–2 during their regular season, had appeared in four of the previous seven AFC/AFL Championship games, advancing to Super Bowl II, and boasting the 1974 NFL MVP, Kenny Stabler, while the Dolphins, 11–3 that year, had appeared in the previous three Super Bowls (VI, VII, and VIII) and were two-time defending champions.

Instead, Miami's defeat in the ‘Sea of Hands’ game ended its historic run; there would be no fourth straight Super Bowl, and to date only the Buffalo Bills have ever advanced to four straight Super Bowls (XXV, XXVI, XXVII, and XXVIII). The Dolphins would not return to the Super Bowl until January 1983, when they would meet (and be defeated by) the Washington Redskins in Super Bowl XVII. The Raiders would not advance to Super Bowl IX, either: They would be defeated in the AFC Championship Game by the Pittsburgh Steelers, 24–13, thus beginning Pittsburgh's historic run of four Super Bowl appearances (and victories) in six years.

== Quotes ==
There he is, fading, looking, looking, looking. He's under the gun. He's caught, He throws. It is...Touchdown! Unbelievable!

— Curt Gowdy describing the play on NBC-TV

Oh, he caught it! He caught it!....He caught it!

— Don Meredith reacting to the play

It looked like he might've been lobbing it into the Promised Land for Miami, but no, Davis got there first!

— Bill King describing the play afterwards on the Raiders radio broadcast

I guess Alameda is still the House of Miracles, huh?

— Al DeRogatis's comments at the end of the game

The house of thrills. You'll never see a better game than this one, ladies and gentlemen; I'm sure you'll agree.

— Gowdy's response to DeRogatis's comments on the game

== Officials ==
- Referee: Ben Dreith (#12)
- Umpire: Art Demmas (#78)
- Head linesman: Ray Sonnenberg (#79)
- Line judge: Bruce Finlayson (#4)
- Back judge: Ben Tompkins (#52)
- Field judge: Jimmy Cole (#86)
