= Art Thoms =

American football player (born 1946)

No. 80
- Position: Defensive tackle

Personal information
- Born: October 20, 1946 (age 80); Teaneck, New Jersey, U.S.
- Listed height: 6 ft 5 in (1.96 m)
- Listed weight: 260 lb (118 kg)

Career information
- High school: Brick Township (Brick Township, New Jersey)
- College: Syracuse
- NFL draft: 1969: 1st round, 22nd overall pick

Career history
- Oakland Raiders (1969–1975); Philadelphia Eagles (1977)

Awards and highlights
- Super Bowl champion (XI); Second-team All-American (1968)

Career NFL/AFL statistics
- Fumble recoveries: 6
- Interceptions: 2
- Touchdowns: 1
- Sacks: 30
- Stats at Pro Football Reference

Arthur William Thoms, Jr. (born October 20, 1946) is an American former professional football player who was a defensive tackle for nine seasons in the National Football League (NFL).

Thoms played high school football at Brick Township High School in Brick Township, New Jersey, after transferring from Wayne Valley High School in Wayne, New Jersey, where he played for two seasons. From there he spent one year in the Hargrave Military Academy, which is where Syracuse Football found him and offered him a full scholarship.

In the 1969 NFL draft, Thoms was selected in the first round out of Syracuse University, New York. He played eight seasons with the Oakland Raiders and was a member of the Super Bowl XI in the 1976. He then played one season with the Philadelphia Eagles before deciding to retire.

In 2002, Art was inducted to the Syracuse University "All Millennium" Football Team.

== See also ==
- List of American Football League players
