= Clarence Davis =

American football player (born 1949)

No. 28
- Position: Running back

Personal information
- Born: June 28, 1949 (age 77); Birmingham, Alabama, U.S.
- Listed height: 5 ft 10 in (1.78 m)
- Listed weight: 195 lb (88 kg)

Career information
- High school: Washington Prep (Los Angeles, California)
- College: USC
- NFL draft: 1971: 4th round, 97th overall pick

Career history
- Oakland Raiders (1971–1978)

Awards and highlights
- Super Bowl champion (XI); Second-team All-American (1969); 2× First-team All-Pac-8 (1969, 1970)

Career NFL statistics
- Rushing attempts: 804
- Rushing yards: 3,640
- Total TDs: 28
- Return yards: 2,140
- Stats at Pro Football Reference

Clarence Eugene Davis (born June 28, 1949) is an American former professional football player who was a running back for eight seasons with the Oakland Raiders of the National Football League (NFL) from 1971 to 1978. He played college football for the USC Trojans. He won an NFL championship with the Raiders, winning Super Bowl XI.

== Early life ==
Davis was born in Birmingham, Alabama, on June 28, 1949. He attended Washington Preparatory High School in Los Angeles. He then studied at the University of Southern California, where he played for the USC Trojans from 1969 to 1970.

In 1969, his junior year, Davis led the Pac-8 Conference in rushing yards (1,275), rushing attempts (282), rushing touchdowns (9), plays from scrimmage (284), and yards from scrimmage (1,287), through ten games. Davis also rushed for 76 yards on 15 attempts in the 1970 Rose Bowl game against Michigan, a 10–3 USC victory, in which Davis was the leading rusher. So it has also been reported that Davis had 1,357 yards in 297 rushing attempts in 1969. He was named an All-American in 1969. In 1970, he rushed for 972 yards (second in the Pac-8), led the Pac-8 in rushing touchdowns (9), tied for total touchdowns (11), and tied for the lead in points scored (66). He was selected twice as All-Pac-8.

In 1970, he was part of USC's "all-black" backfield (the first one of its kind in Division I (NCAA) history), that included fullback Sam Cunningham and quarterback Jimmy Jones. Davis was one of the five USC African American starters (along with Sam Cunningham, Jimmy Jones, Charlie Weaver and Tody Smith), that played against an all-white University of Alabama football team, winning 42–21 in Birmingham on September 12, 1970. This game was historically significant, because it played a key role in convincing the University of Alabama and its fan base to accelerate the integration of its football team.

In 2012, he was inducted into the USC Hall of Fame.

== Professional career ==
Davis was drafted in the fourth round of the 1971 NFL draft by the Oakland Raiders (97th overall). He played his entire career with the Raiders from 1971 to 1978, appearing in only two games in his final season after being placed on injured reserve subsequent to a knee operation.

Davis finished his rookie season with 734 return yards at 27.2 yards per return (4th best in the league), 321 rushing yards, 97 receiving yards, and two total touchdowns. The most touchdowns he scored in a season was in his next season (1972), where he scored six touchdowns (all rushing) in 71 rushing attempts, gaining 363 yards (5.1 yards per carry). He arguably had his best rushing season in 1973, with 609 yards and a 5.3 yards per carry average and four touchdowns.

In 1972 and 1973, Davis played behind Charlie Smith at running back. In 1974, Davis and Smith both started seven games. He suffered a knee injury in the fourth game of the season against the Cleveland Browns, missed three games during the season (games seven, nine and ten), and after coming back had three other games with only two, four and seven rushing attempts. His average yards per carry fell below 5.1 for the first time in his career, to 4.3. Davis had problems with a leg muscle injury before the 1975 season started. He started eight games, but again missed three games altogether, and averaged 4.3 yards per carry.

Davis started 12 games in 1976, the second most of his career. He ran for 516 yards, with a 4.5 yards per carry average, and three touchdowns. He also had a career best 27 pass receptions for 191 yards. In his penultimate season (1977), he collected 911 yards from scrimmage (787 rushing, 124 receiving) along with 268 yards on returns. He had 194 rushing attempts, by far the most of any season in his career, and five touchdowns. In his last season (1978), he played in only 2 games, rushing for 4 yards on 14 carries and catching 4 passes for 24 yards, before being lost for the season with a knee injury that required surgery. His knee did not pass a pre-season physical in 1979.

Other than his rookie year and abbreviated final season, Davis participated in the playoffs every year of his career (1972–77). His best overall playoff performance came in 1976, a year the Raiders won the Super Bowl. In three playoff games, he rushed for 220 yards at 6.5 yards per attempt.

In Super Bowl XI, played on January 9, 1977, Davis played a key role in the Raiders' 32–14 victory over the Minnesota Vikings. He rushed 16 times for 137 yards, an average of 8.6 yards, and had 118 yards by the end of the third quarter. He also made key blocks for others in the game. The Associated Press named him Player of the Game. Davis gained most of his yards running behind left guard Gene Upshaw, left tackle Art Shell, and tight end Dave Caspar, all of whom are in the Pro Football Hall of Fame. During the Super Bowl, Davis, who had been plagued by a knee injury for three years, had runs of 20, 35, 13, 18, and 16 yards, as part of a Raiders team that gained 429 yards, a Super Bowl record at the time.

In the span of his eight seasons, he had played in 89 games, rushing 804 times for 3,640 yards for 26 touchdowns along with 99 catches for 865 yards for two touchdowns and 2,140 return yards on 79 returns. His 27.1 yards per return ranks as 11th all time. In 12 total playoff games (including the "Sea of Hands" game), he rushed for 506 yards on 128 attempts with two touchdowns, while catching 13 passes for 96 yards with one touchdown.

At the last Raiders home game of 2016, Davis was given the honor of lighting the Al Davis memorial torch.

== 1974 Sea of Hands Catch ==
During the 1974 playoffs, the Raiders met the two-time defending Super Bowl Champion Miami Dolphins in the divisional round, winning the game in extraordinary fashion on a game ending catch by Davis.

Clarence Davis' catch in a Sea of Hands ended one of the greatest NFL games of all time, pitting the Oakland Raiders against the Miami Dolphins in the 1974 NFL Playoffs. With 4:54 to play, Kenny Stabler completed a 72-yard touchdown pass to Cliff Branch. Branch went to the ground to make the catch, but being untouched by Dolphin defenders, he popped upright and ran the remaining 27 yards to complete the play. With 4:37 to go, the score was Raiders 21, Dolphins 19. A mere two minutes later, Miami had responded with a touchdown that gave them the lead again by five.

With two minutes left in the game, the Raiders had one last chance. Stabler drove the Raiders to the Miami 8-yard line with 35 seconds left. On 1st and goal, Stabler called a pass play, took the snap, and scrambled to his left. Miami defensive end Vern Den Herder tripped Stabler from behind, but Stabler got off a floating pass toward Davis in the end zone before going down. Davis, Miami defensive back Charlie Babb, and linebacker Mike Kolen all leaped for the ball at the same time and each got their hands on it. Davis, however, out-wrestled Babb and Kolen for the ball and the winning score. This 28–26 victory, with a combined three touchdowns scored by both teams in the final 4:37, made this Raiders comeback one of the most unforgettable in Dolphins-Raiders history.

The irony of the "Sea of Hands" catch lay in the fact that Davis was nicknamed "hands of wood" by some teammates for his difficulty catching balls out of the backfield. His poor hands as a receiver were widely known.

== NFL career statistics ==
Legend
	Won the Super Bowl
**Bold**	Career high

=== Regular season ===
Year	Team	Games		Rushing					Receiving				
Year	Team	GP	GS	Att	Yds	Avg	Lng	TD	Rec	Yds	Avg	Lng	TD
1971	OAK	**14**	0	54	321	**5.9**	39	2	15	97	6.5	18	0
1972	OAK	11	0	71	363	5.1	**45**	**6**	8	82	10.3	26	0
1973	OAK	**14**	0	116	609	5.3	32	4	7	76	10.9	19	0
1974	OAK	11	7	129	554	4.3	41	2	11	145	**13.2**	**45**	**1**
1975	OAK	11	8	112	486	4.3	41	4	11	126	11.5	31	**1**
1976	OAK	12	12	114	516	4.5	31	3	**27**	**191**	7.1	17	0
1977	OAK	**14**	**14**	**194**	**787**	4.1	37	5	16	124	7.8	38	0
1978	OAK	2	2	14	4	0.3	7	0	4	24	6.0	13	0
		89	43	804	3,640	4.5	45	26	99	865	8.7	45	2

=== Playoffs ===
Year	Team	Games		Rushing					Receiving				
Year	Team	GP	GS	Att	Yds	Avg	Lng	TD	Rec	Yds	Avg	Lng	TD
1972	OAK	1	0	2	7	3.5	5	0	0	0	0.0	0	0
1973	OAK	2	0	16	63	3.9	9	0	1	6	6.0	6	0
1974	OAK	2	2	22	75	3.4	19	0	**4**	24	6.0	10	**1**
1975	OAK	2	2	29	92	3.2	18	0	3	19	6.3	10	0
1976	OAK	**3**	**3**	**34**	**220**	**6.5**	**35**	**1**	3	12	4.0	5	0
1977	OAK	2	2	25	49	2.0	30	**1**	2	**35**	**17.5**	**21**	0
		12	9	128	506	4.0	35	2	13	96	7.4	21	1

== Personal life ==
Davis has a son named Tyler Davis, who played college football at Missouri Valley College. Tyler was signed by the Miami Dolphins on January 4, 2016, becoming the first player to be signed from the German Football League straight to the NFL.
