= Ken Stabler =

American football player (1945–2015)

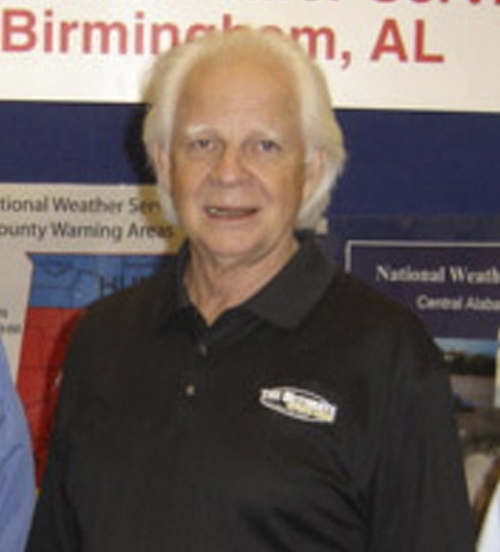
- Stabler in 2007

No. 12, 16
- Position: Quarterback

Personal information
- Born: December 25, 1945; Foley, Alabama, U.S.
- Died: July 8, 2015 (aged 69); Gulfport, Mississippi, U.S.
- Listed height: 6 ft 3 in (1.91 m)
- Listed weight: 215 lb (98 kg)

Career information
- High school: Foley
- College: Alabama (1964–1967)
- NFL draft: 1968: 2nd round, 52nd overall pick

Career history
- Oakland Raiders (1968); → Spokane Shockers (1968); Oakland Raiders (1970–1979); Houston Oilers (1980–1981); New Orleans Saints (1982–1984)

Awards and highlights
- Super Bowl champion (XI); NFL Most Valuable Player (1974); NFL Offensive Player of the Year (1974); First-team All-Pro (1974); Second-team All-Pro (1976); 4× Pro Bowl (1973, 1974, 1976, 1977); 2× NFL passing touchdowns leader (1974, 1976); 2× NFL completion percentage leader (1973, 1976); NFL passer rating leader (1976); Hickok Belt (1976); Bert Bell Award (1976); NFL 1970s All-Decade Team; National champion (1965); First-team All-American (1967); First-team All-SEC (1967)

Career NFL statistics
- Passing attempts: 3,793
- Passing completions: 2,270
- Completion percentage: 59.8%
- TD–INT: 194–222
- Passing yards: 27,938
- Passer rating: 75.3
- Stats at Pro Football Reference
- Pro Football Hall of Fame

Kenneth Michael Stabler (December 25, 1945 – July 8, 2015) was an American professional football quarterback who played in the National Football League (NFL) for 17 seasons, primarily with the Oakland Raiders. Nicknamed "Snake", he played college football for the Alabama Crimson Tide, earning first-team All-American honors in 1967. Stabler was selected by the Raiders in the second round of the 1968 NFL/AFL draft.

During his 10 seasons in Oakland, Stabler was named Most Valuable Player in 1974 after leading the league in passing touchdowns. He also received four Pro Bowl selections and one first-team All-Pro selection while leading the league twice in both passing touchdowns and completion percentage and once in passer rating. His most successful season was in 1976 when he helped the Raiders win their first Super Bowl title in Super Bowl XI. He was posthumously inducted to the Pro Football Hall of Fame in 2016.

== Early life ==
Stabler was a highly touted football player at Foley High School in Foley, Alabama. He led Foley to a win–loss record of 29–1 over his high school football career—the only loss coming against Vigor High School. He was an all-around athlete in high school, averaging 29 points a game in basketball and excelling enough as a left-handed pitcher in baseball to receive minor-league contract offers from the Houston Astros and New York Yankees. He was an all-American athlete. During his high school career, he earned his nickname "Snake" from his coach following a long, winding touchdown run.

== College career ==
Stabler was recruited by head coach Bear Bryant at the University of Alabama in Tuscaloosa. Due to NCAA regulations at the time, freshmen were ineligible to play on the varsity in the University Division. Stabler was on the freshman team in 1964, when the Crimson Tide won the National Championship with quarterbacks Joe Namath and Steve Sloan. Despite being named National Champions, Alabama lost their bowl game, falling to the Texas Longhorns in the 1965 Orange Bowl.

As a sophomore in 1965, Stabler was used sparingly as a back-up to Sloan at quarterback, following Namath's departure to the AFL. That year, the Crimson Tide won their second consecutive National Championship, finishing the season with a record of 9–1–1. The team defeated the Nebraska Cornhuskers in the Orange Bowl, 39–28.

As a junior in 1966, he took over the starting quarterback position. He led the team to an undefeated, 11–0 season which ended in a 34–7 rout of Nebraska in the Sugar Bowl. Despite the unblemished record, Alabama was snubbed by the polls, finishing third behind Notre Dame and Michigan State, neither of which played in a bowl.

Expectations were high in Stabler's senior season, though those expectations would not be completely fulfilled. The offense often struggled in 1967, and the defense's performance slipped. During the season, Bryant kicked Stabler off the team for cutting class and partying, though he was given a second chance. The Tide finished with an 8–2–1 record, including a loss to rival Tennessee. Though the season was lackluster, Stabler would provide a memorable moment in the Iron Bowl. Trailing 3–0 in a game drenched by rain, Stabler scampered through the mud for a 47-yard, game-winning touchdown which gave the Tide a 7–3 victory over rival Auburn at Legion Field. The play is commonly referred to as the "Run in the Mud" in Alabama football lore.

== Professional career ==
=== Oakland Raiders ===
Stabler was selected in the second round of the 1968 NFL/AFL draft by the Oakland Raiders, the reigning AFL champions. He was the fifth quarterback taken, after Greg Landry, Eldridge Dickey, Heisman Trophy winner Gary Beban, and Mike Livingston. He was also drafted to play baseball by the New York Yankees in 1966, the New York Mets in 1967, and the Houston Astros in 1968.

Stabler signed a two-year contract with the Raiders in March 1968. However, he later underwent knee surgery and spent the 1968 AFL season on injured reserve (IR). He worked out with the taxi squad while on IR. In November 1968, the Raiders sent Stabler to Spokane, Washington, to play for the Spokane Shockers of the Continental Football League. He played in two games for the Shockers before being recalled by the Raiders in late November. In July 1969, Stabler left the Raiders, stating "there's not much sense in staying in it if I wasn't enjoying it." However, later in November 1969, Stabler said "I'll be back in pro football come June." In January 1970, it was reported that Stabler and Raiders head coach John Madden agreed that Stabler would return to the Raiders for training camp in July. Stabler made his first regular season appearance as a Raider in 1970. He first attracted attention in the NFL in a 1972 playoff game against the Pittsburgh Steelers. After entering the game in relief of a flu-ridden Daryle Lamonica, he scored the go-ahead touchdown late in the fourth quarter on a 30-yard scramble. The Steelers, however, came back to win on a controversial, deflected pass from Terry Bradshaw to Franco Harris, later known in football lore as the Immaculate Reception. After Lamonica was unable to lead the Raiders to an offensive touchdown in the first three games of the 1973 season, Stabler took over as starter. Stabler helped the Raiders finish the season with a 9–4–1 record and earn an appearance in the AFC championship game.

On April 2, 1974, Stabler and several NFL stars agreed to join the newly created World Football League. He signed a multi-year contract to play for the Birmingham Americans, beginning in 1976 once his Raiders contract would have expired. He said "the biggest thing to me is getting back home. Getting to play before the people in the South is where it's at for me. In two years I'll be in Birmingham if I have to hitchhike." The WFL folded midway through the 1975 season, and Stabler remained in the NFL without ever playing in the WFL.

After having severe knee injuries, Stabler became less a scrambling quarterback and more a classic, drop-back passer, known for accurate passes and an uncanny ability to lead late, come-from-behind drives. During the peak of his career, he had a receiving corps consisting of sprinter Cliff Branch, sure handed receiver Fred Biletnikoff, and tight end Dave Casper. All three of Stabler's receivers would ultimately end up in the Hall of Fame. The Raiders' philosophy was to pound teams with their running game (aided by multiple-time Pro Bowler Marv Hubbard at fullback, and Clarence Davis at tailback), then stretch them with their long passing game. Although Stabler lacked remarkable arm strength, he was a master of the long pass to Branch, and accurate on intermediate routes to Biletnikoff and Casper. As a starter in Oakland, Stabler was named AFC player of the year in 1974 and 1976, and was the NFL's passing champion in 1976. In January 1977, he guided the Raiders to their first Super Bowl victory, a decisive 32–14 win over the Minnesota Vikings at the Rose Bowl. Stabler was awarded the Hickok Belt for 1976, as the year's top professional sports athlete.

In the 1977 AFC playoffs against the Baltimore Colts on Christmas Eve, Stabler completed a legendary fourth quarter pass to Casper to set up a game-tying field goal by Errol Mann. This play, dubbed the "Ghost to the Post," sent the game to double overtime, which the visiting Raiders won 37–31, after Stabler threw a 10-yard touchdown pass to Casper. In the second game of 1978 on September 10, the Holy Roller (Immaculate Deception) Game saw Oakland win 21–20 at San Diego after a fourth quarter forward fumble by Stabler was caught and forward-fumbled by two other players to score a touchdown and win the game. This caused the Ken Stabler Rule to be enacted in 1979, permitting only the fumbling player to recover the ball during a fourth down play, or during any down played after the two-minute warning in a half or overtime.

=== Houston Oilers ===
After subpar 1978 and 1979 seasons in which the Raiders failed to make the playoffs and saw the departure of many team leaders from the Super Bowl run – Clarence Davis, Skip Thomas, George Atkinson, Fred Biletnikoff, Willie Brown, and head coach John Madden – Stabler was traded in March 1980 to the Oilers for Dan Pastorini. He left as the Raiders' all-time leader in completions (1,486), passing yards (19,078), and touchdown passes (150). The Oilers saw Stabler as the missing ingredient that could finally get them past the rival Steelers and into the Super Bowl. Houston lacked the exceptional talent on offense that Stabler had thrived with in Oakland, as Earl Campbell and Casper—who was also acquired in a trade from the Raiders—were the few potent weapons they had. Meanwhile, Pastorini lost the starting job in Oakland to Jim Plunkett after an injury, and Plunkett then led the Raiders to a win in Super Bowl XV, which included a playoff win over the Oilers in the wild card game. Houston head coach Bum Phillips was fired shortly after the season, succeeded by defensive coordinator Ed Biles.

Without the popular head coach that rejuvenated an otherwise woeful Houston franchise, Stabler did not report to training camp in 1981 and announced his retirement through his agent on July 23. After five weeks and an injury to projected starter Gifford Nielsen, he returned to the Oilers in late August and signed a two-year contract. He had a mediocre season, as Houston went 7–9 and missed the playoffs.

=== New Orleans Saints ===
Released by the Oilers after the season, Stabler re-joined Phillips in New Orleans in late August. (Dave Wilson had a season-ending knee injury on August 12.) In mid-September, the Saints traded longtime starter Archie Manning for offensive tackle Leon Gray. By this time, however, the 37-year-old Stabler was past his prime and the Saints were still a fairly dismal franchise. The first year was interrupted by a two-month players' strike; New Orleans was 4–5 and narrowly missed the expanded playoffs. The 1983 season was his best as a Saint. He started 14 games, and while the team's record in those games was only 7–7, Stabler was the starter for the final game of the season, in New Orleans, against the division rival Los Angeles Rams. Had the Saints won that game, they would have finished 9–7 and reached their first trip to the playoffs. But the Rams pulled out the victory late in the 4th quarter, 26–24. The Saints then acquired New York Jets veteran Richard Todd, who like Stabler played for Bryant at Alabama, before the 1984 season and Stabler retired in the middle of that season, in late October.

== Legacy ==
Stabler was the fastest to win 100 games as a starting quarterback, having done so in 150 games, which bettered Johnny Unitas' previous mark of 153 games. Since then, only Terry Bradshaw in 147 games, Joe Montana in 139 games, and Tom Brady in 131 games have reached 100 wins more quickly. Stabler was also the first NFL quarterback to retire with at least 200 passing yards per game in the playoffs (minimum 10 playoff appearances).

Stabler was named the twenty-seventh greatest quarterback of the post-merger era by Football Nation.

The Professional Football Researchers Association named Stabler to the PFRA Hall of Very Good Class of 2014.

At the 2016 NFL Honors, it was announced that Stabler had been selected for the Pro Football Hall of Fame, and he was officially inducted on August 6, 2016.

== Career statistics ==
Legend
	AP NFL MVP & OPOTY
	Won the Super Bowl
	Led the league
**Bold**	Career high

=== NFL ===
Year	Team	Games			Passing							Rushing			
Year	Team	GP	GS	Record	Cmp	Att	Pct	Yds	TD	Int	Rtg	Att	Yds	Avg	TD
1970	OAK	3	0	–	3	7	42.8	52	0	1	18.5	1	−4	−4.0	0
1971	OAK	14	1	1–0	24	48	50.0	268	1	4	39.2	4	29	**7.3**	**2**
1972	OAK	14	1	0–1	44	74	59.5	524	4	3	82.3	6	27	4.5	0
1973	OAK	14	11	8–2–1	163	260	62.7	1,997	14	10	88.3	**21**	**101**	4.8	0
1974	OAK	14	13	11–2	178	310	57.4	2,469	26	12	94.9	12	−2	−0.2	1
1975	OAK	14	13	10–3	171	293	58.4	2,296	16	24	67.3	6	−5	−0.8	0
1976	OAK	12	12	**11–1**	194	291	**66.7**	2,737	**27**	17	**103.4**	7	−2	−0.3	1
1977	OAK	13	13	10–3	169	294	57.5	2,176	20	20	75.2	3	−3	−1.0	0
1978	OAK	16	16	9–7	237	406	58.4	2,944	16	**30**	63.4	4	0	0.0	0
1979	OAK	16	16	9–7	**304**	**498**	61.1	**3,615**	26	22	82.2	16	−4	−0.3	0
1980	HOU	16	16	11–5	293	457	64.1	3,202	13	28	68.7	15	−22	−1.5	0
1981	HOU	13	12	5–7	165	285	57.9	1,988	14	18	69.5	10	−3	−0.3	0
1982	NO	8	8	4–4	117	189	61.9	1,343	6	10	71.8	3	−4	−1.3	0
1983	NO	14	14	7–7	176	311	56.6	1,988	9	18	61.4	9	−14	−1.6	0
1984	NO	3	0	–	33	70	47.1	339	2	5	41.3	1	−1	−1.0	0
Career		184	146	96–49–1	2,270	3,793	59.8	27,938	194	222	75.3	118	93	0.8	4

- Stabler's five consecutive appearances in conference championship games (from 1973 to 1977) remained a record for NFL quarterbacks for almost 40 years, until Stabler's record was surpassed by Tom Brady in 2016.

=== College ===
Season	Team	Passing							Rushing			
Season	Team	Cmp	Att	Yds	Pct	TD	Int	Rtg	Att	Yds	Avg	TD
1965	Alabama	3	11	26	27.3	0	0	47.1	61	328	**5.4**	1
1966	Alabama	74	114	956	**64.9**	**9**	5	**152.6**	93	**397**	4.3	3
1967	Alabama	**103**	**178**	**1,214**	57.9	**9**	**13**	117.2	**111**	113	1.0	**5**
Career		180	303	2,196	59.4	18	18	128.0	265	838	3.2	9

== After football ==
=== Broadcasting career ===
Following his retirement as a player, Stabler worked as a color commentator, first on CBS NFL telecasts, and then on radio with Eli Gold for Alabama football games. Stabler left before Alabama's 2008 season and was replaced by Phil Savage.

=== Charitable work ===
Stabler served as chairman of the XOXO Stabler Foundation, a 501(c)3 nonprofit with a mission "to raise funds, build awareness and hope for a variety of charitable causes." Stabler's celebrity golf tournaments in Point Clear, Alabama have raised nearly $600,000 for charitable partner The Ronald McDonald House of Mobile, which serves families of seriously ill and injured children receiving medical treatment at local hospitals.

=== In media ===
- Stabler was featured on a Saturday Night Live skit as the spokesman for a fictional product called the "Lung Brush".
- Professional wrestler Jake "The Snake" Roberts adopted his nickname "The Snake" as a tribute to Stabler.
- Stabler is featured on the "NFL Legends" team in the video game NFL Street.
- Stabler appears in the 2K video game All-Pro Football 2K8.

== Personal life ==
Stabler was married three times: to Isabel Clarke from 1968 to 1973, to Debbie Fitzsimmons from 1975 to 1978, and to Rose Molly Burch from 1984 to 2009.

Stabler had three daughters, Kendra Stabler Moyes, Alexa Stabler-Adams, and Marissa Leigh Stabler. In 2017, Alexa Stabler-Adams was certified by the NFLPA as a sports agent.

Renowned for being cool and cerebral on the field, Stabler was equally legendary for his off-field exploits; he wrote in his 1986 autobiography Snake, "The monotony of [training] camp was so oppressive that without the diversions of whiskey and women, those of us who were wired for activity and no more than six hours sleep a night might have gone berserk." Stabler told stories of drunk Raiders teammates pointing guns at him, and bailing out a teammate from jail who was wearing nothing but blue cowboy boots and his Super Bowl ring. "We were the only pro team who traveled with its own bail bondsman," he said.

=== Death ===
Stabler died of colon cancer on July 8, 2015, at the age of 69. He had been diagnosed with the disease in February 2015. After some initial confusion when The Tuscaloosa News leaked a draft obituary for Stabler before word of his death could be confirmed, his family confirmed his death in a statement issued on July 9.

In February 2016, The New York Times reported that researchers at Boston University discovered high Stage 3 chronic traumatic encephalopathy (CTE) in Stabler's brain after his death. He is one of at least 345 NFL players to be diagnosed after death with chronic traumatic encephalopathy (CTE), which is caused by repeated hits to the head. He was buried at Pine Rest Cemetery in Foley, Alabama.

== See also ==
- Bay Area Sports Hall of Fame
- List of left-handed quarterbacks
- List of Pro Football Hall of Fame inductees
- List of NFL players with chronic traumatic encephalopathy
