= 1974 NFL draft =

NFL player selection

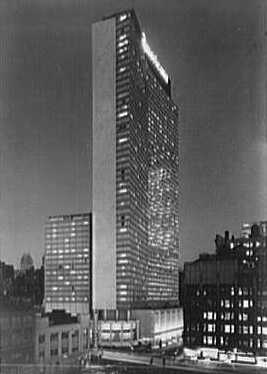
- Americana Hotel (location of the draft), photographed in 1962

General information
- Date: January 29–30, 1974
- Time: 10:00am EST
- Location: Americana Hotel in New York City, New York
- Network: no television coverage

Overview
- 442 total selections in 17 rounds
- League: NFL
- First selection: Ed "Too Tall" Jones, DE; Dallas Cowboys
- Mr. Irrelevant: Ken Dickerson, DB; Miami Dolphins
- Most selections (25): Baltimore Colts
- Fewest selections (10): Houston Oilers
- Hall of Famers: 7: LB Randy Gradishar; WR Lynn Swann; TE Dave Casper; LB Jack Lambert; WR John Stallworth; C Mike Webster; S Donnie Shell

The 1974 NFL draft took place at the Americana Hotel in New York City, New York, on January 29–30, 1974. Each of the 26 NFL teams were granted 17 selections for a total of 442 picks.

Many experts consider the Pittsburgh Steelers to have had the best draft class in NFL history as they selected four players later inducted into the Pro Football Hall of Fame (Lynn Swann, Jack Lambert, John Stallworth, and Mike Webster). A fifth Hall of Famer, Donnie Shell, was signed by Pittsburgh after going unselected in the draft. The closest any other team has come to this success in a draft is the Dallas Cowboys' 1964 draft, when three Hall of Famers were taken (Roger Staubach, Mel Renfro, and Bob Hayes. The Green Bay Packers also selected three Hall of Famers in 1958 (Jim Taylor, Ray Nitschke, and Jerry Kramer).

The Houston Oilers had the first pick in the 1974 draft based on their one-win record in 1973, but they traded the first overall pick—as well as the first pick of the third round, #53 overall—to the Dallas Cowboys in exchange for defensive end Tody Smith and wide receiver Billy Parks. Dallas used the two picks to select two future Pro Bowlers, defensive end Ed "Too Tall" Jones and quarterback Danny White.

This was the first NFL draft since 1938 to not have any quarterbacks taken in the first round, and one of only six. Along with 1988, it is the only draft where no quarterback was taken in the first two rounds, and 1974 is generally regarded as one of the worst quarterback draft classes of all time, with only Danny White (the first quarterback taken, with the first pick in the third round) and fourth round pick Mike Boryla reaching the Pro Bowl, and even Boryla was out of the NFL by 1978.

In the seventeenth round, the Green Bay Packers selected wide receiver Randy Woodfield of Portland State (428th overall). Cut in training camp, he later became a convicted serial killer, known as the 'I-5 killer'.

The last remaining active player in the NFL from the 1974 draft class was center Mike Webster, who retired after the 1990 season.

== Player selections ==
*	= compensatory selection
†	= Pro Bowler
‡	= Hall of Famer

Positions key
Offense	Defense	Special teams
QB — Quarterback; RB — Running back; FB — Fullback; WR — Wide receiver; TE — Tight end; OL — Offensive lineman; T — Tackle; G — Guard; C — Center	DL — Defensive lineman; DT — Defensive tackle (Note: Includes nose tackle (NT)); DE — Defensive end; EDGE — Edge rusher; LB — Linebacker (Note: Includes middle linebacker (MLB/MIKE), weakside linebacker (WILL), strongside linebacker (SAM), off-ball linebacker, and outside linebacker (OLB)); DB — Defensive back; CB — Cornerback; S — Safety (Note: Includes free safety (FS) and strong safety (SS))	K — Kicker (Note: Also known as a placekicker (PK)); P — Punter; LS — Long snapper; RS — Return specialist (Note: Includes kickoff and punt returners)

=== Round 1–12 ===
Rnd.	Pick	Team	Player	Pos.	College	Notes
1	1	Dallas Cowboys	Ed Jones ^{†}	DE	Tennessee State	from Houston
1	2	San Diego Chargers	Bo Matthews	RB	Colorado	
1	3	New York Giants	John Hicks	G	Ohio State	
1	4	Chicago Bears	Waymond Bryant	LB	Tennessee State	
1	5	Baltimore Colts	John Dutton ^{†}	DE	Nebraska	
1	6	New York Jets	Carl Barzilauskas	DT	Indiana	
1	7	St. Louis Cardinals	J. V. Cain	TE	Colorado	
1	8	Detroit Lions	Ed O'Neil	LB	Penn State	from New Orleans
1	9	San Francisco 49ers	Wilbur Jackson	RB	Alabama	From New England
1	10	San Francisco 49ers	Bill Sandifer	DT	UCLA	
1	11	Los Angeles Rams	John Cappelletti	RB	Penn State	From Philadelphia Heisman Trophy winner
1	12	Green Bay Packers	Barty Smith	FB	Richmond	
1	13	New Orleans Saints	Rick Middleton	LB	Ohio State	from Detroit
1	14	Denver Broncos	Randy Gradishar^{‡}^{†}	LB	Ohio State	
1	15	San Diego Chargers	Don Goode	LB	Kansas	from Cleveland
1	16	Kansas City Chiefs	Woody Green	RB	Arizona State	
1	17	Minnesota Vikings	Fred McNeill	LB	UCLA	From Atlanta
1	18	Buffalo Bills	Reuben Gant	TE	Oklahoma State	
1	19	Oakland Raiders	Henry Lawrence ^{†}	T	Florida A&M	
1	20	Chicago Bears	Dave Gallagher	DT	Michigan	From Washington via Los Angeles
1	21	Pittsburgh Steelers	Lynn Swann^{‡}^{†}	WR	USC	
1	22	Dallas Cowboys	Charley Young	RB	NC State	
1	23	Cincinnati Bengals	Bill Kollar	DT	Montana State	
1	24	Baltimore Colts	Roger Carr ^{†}	WR	Louisiana Tech	From Los Angeles
1	25	Minnesota Vikings	Steve Riley	T	USC	
1	26	Miami Dolphins	Don Reese	DE	Jackson State	
2	27	Buffalo Bills	Doug Allen	LB	Penn State	from Houston
2	28	New York Giants	Tom Mullen	LB	Southwest Missouri State	
2	29	Minnesota Vikings	John Holland	WR	Tennessee State	from San Diego
2	30	New England Patriots	Steve Corbett	G	Boston College	from Chicago
2	31	New York Jets	Gordie Browne	G	Boston College	
2	32	Baltimore Colts	Fred Cook	DE	Southern Miss	
2	33	St. Louis Cardinals	Greg Kindle	LB	Tennessee State	
2	34	New England Patriots	Steve Nelson ^{†}	LB	North Dakota State	
2	35	San Francisco 49ers	Keith Fahnhorst ^{†}	T	Minnesota	
2	36	New Orleans Saints	Paul Seal	TE	Michigan	
2	37	Baltimore Colts	Ed Shuttlesworth	RB	Michigan	from Philadelphia
2	38	Miami Dolphins	Andre Tillman	TE	Texas Tech	from Green Bay
2	39	Detroit Lions	Billy Howard	DT	Alcorn A&M	
2	40	Cleveland Browns	Billy Corbett	T	Johnson C. Smith	
2	41	Kansas City Chiefs	Charlie Getty	T	Penn State	
2	42	Denver Broncos	Carl Wafer	DT	Tennessee State	
2	43	San Diego Chargers	Mark Markovich	C	Penn State	from Buffalo
2	44	Atlanta Falcons	Gerald Tinker	WR	Kent State	
2	45	Oakland Raiders	Dave Casper^{‡}^{†}	TE	Notre Dame	
2	46	Pittsburgh Steelers	Jack Lambert^{‡}^{†}	LB	Kent State	
2	47	Miami Dolphins	Benny Malone	RB	Arizona State	from Dallas
2	48	Cincinnati Bengals	Charlie Davis	RB	Colorado	
2	49	San Francisco 49ers	Delvin Williams ^{†}	RB	Kansas	from Washington
2	50	Los Angeles Rams	Bill Simpson	S	Michigan State	
2	51	Minnesota Vikings	Matt Blair ^{†}	LB	Iowa State	
2	52	Miami Dolphins	Jeris White	CB	Hawaii	
3	53	Dallas Cowboys	Danny White ^{†}	QB	Arizona State	from Houston
3	54	Chicago Bears	Wayne Wheeler	WR	Alabama	from San Diego
3	55	New York Giants	Rick Dvorak	DE	Wichita State	
3	56	Chicago Bears	Greg Horton	G	Colorado	
3	57	Baltimore Colts	Glenn Robinson	LB	Oklahoma State	
3	58	New York Jets	Godwin Turk	LB	Southern	
3	59	San Diego Chargers	Bill Rudder	RB	Tennessee	from St. Louis
3	60	St. Louis Cardinals	Steve George	DT	Houston	from San Francisco
3	61	Cincinnati Bengals	Dave Lapham	G	Syracuse	from New Orleans
3	62	Chicago Bears	Cliff Taylor	RB	Memphis State	from New England via Washington
3	63	Philadelphia Eagles	Mitch Sutton	DT	Kansas	
3	64	Minnesota Vikings	Steve Craig	TE	Northwestern	from Green Bay via San Diego
3	65	Detroit Lions	Dexter Bussey	RB	Texas–Arlington	
3	66	Kansas City Chiefs	David Jaynes	QB	Kansas	
3	67	Baltimore Colts	Robert Pratt	G	North Carolina	
3	68	Denver Broncos	Claudie Minor	T	San Diego State	from Cleveland
3	69	Atlanta Falcons	Kim McQuilken	QB	Lehigh	
3	70	Buffalo Bills	Gary Marangi	QB	Boston College	
3	71	Atlanta Falcons	Maurice Spencer	CB	North Carolina Central	from Oakland via New Orleans
3	72	Dallas Cowboys	Cal Peterson	LB	UCLA	
3	73	Cincinnati Bengals	Evan Jolitz	LB	Cincinnati	
3	74	New York Jets	Roscoe Word	CB	Jackson State	from Washington
3	75	Oakland Raiders	Mark van Eeghen	RB	Colgate	from Pittsburgh
3	76	Los Angeles Rams	Al Oliver	T	UCLA	
3	77	Minnesota Vikings	Scott Anderson	C	Missouri	
3	78	Miami Dolphins	Nat Moore ^{†}	WR	Florida	
4	79	Houston Oilers	Steve Manstedt	LB	Nebraska	
4	80	New York Giants	Carl Summerell	QB	East Carolina	
4	81	San Diego Chargers	Harrison Davis	WR	Virginia	
4	82	Pittsburgh Steelers	John Stallworth^{‡}^{†}	WR	Alabama A&M	from Chicago via New England
4	83	San Francisco 49ers	Clint Haslerig	WR	Michigan	from N. Y. Jets via New Orleans
4	84	Baltimore Colts	Tony Bell	DB	Bowling Green	
4	85	St. Louis Cardinals	Durwood Keeton	DB	Oklahoma	
4	86	Minnesota Vikings	Mike Townsend	DB	Notre Dame	from New Orleans
4	87	Cincinnati Bengals	Mike Boryla ^{†}	QB	Stanford	from New England
4	88	New Orleans Saints	Rod McNeill	RB	USC	from San Francisco
4	89	Philadelphia Eagles	Frank LeMaster ^{†}	LB	Kentucky	
4	90	San Francisco 49ers	Sammy Johnson	RB	North Carolina	from Green Bay
4	91	St. Louis Cardinals	Ike Harris	WR	Iowa State	from Detroit
4	92	Denver Broncos	Ozell Collie	DB	Colorado	
4	93	Oakland Raiders	Morris Bradshaw	WR	Ohio State	from Cleveland
4	94	Kansas City Chiefs	Matt Herkenhoff	T	Minnesota	
4	95	Buffalo Bills	Carlester Crumpler	RB	East Carolina	
4	96	Atlanta Falcons	Vince Kendrick	RB	Florida	
4	97	Dallas Cowboys	Ken Hutcherson	LB	Livingston	from Oakland
4	98	Cincinnati Bengals	Daryl White	G	Nebraska	
4	99	Los Angeles Rams	Norris Weese	QB	Ole Miss	from Washington
4	100	Pittsburgh Steelers	Jimmy Allen	S	UCLA	
4	101	Dallas Cowboys	Andy Adrade	RB	Northern Michigan	
4	102	Los Angeles Rams	Frank Johnson	T	UC Riverside	
4	103	Cincinnati Bengals	Richard Williams	WR	Abilene Christian	from Minnesota
4	104	Miami Dolphins	Bill Stevenson	DT	Drake	
5	105	San Diego Chargers	John Teerlinck	DT	Western Illinois	from Houston via Washington
5	106	Buffalo Bills	Gary Hayman	WR	Penn State	from San Diego
5	107	New York Giants	Don Clune	WR	Penn	
5	108	Philadelphia Eagles	Jim Cagle	DT	Georgia	from Chicago
5	109	Atlanta Falcons	Henry Childs ^{†}	TE	Kansas State	from Baltimore via Detroit
5	110	New York Jets	Gary Baccus	LB	Oklahoma	
5	111	St. Louis Cardinals	Steve Neils	LB	Minnesota	
5	112	New England Patriots	Andy Johnson	RB	Georgia	
5	113	New Orleans Saints	Joel Parker	WR	Florida	from San Francisco
5	114	Cincinnati Bengals	Haskel Stanback	RB	Tennessee	from New Orleans
5	115	Philadelphia Eagles	Keith Krepfle	TE	Iowa State	
5	116	Green Bay Packers	Steve Odom ^{†}	WR	Utah	
5	117	Detroit Lions	Carl Capria	DB	Purdue	
5	118	Cleveland Browns	Mark Ilgenfritz	DE	Vanderbilt	
5	119	New York Giants	Clyde Powers	S	Oklahoma	from Kansas City
5	120	Minnesota Vikings	Jim Ferguson	CB	Stanford	from Denver
5	121	New Orleans Saints	Terry Schmidt	CB	Ball State	from Atlanta
5	122	Buffalo Bills	Tim Guy	T	Oregon	
5	123	Oakland Raiders	Pete Wessel	DB	Northwestern	
5	124	New England Patriots	Charles Battle	DE	Grambling	
5	125	Pittsburgh Steelers	Mike Webster^{‡}^{†}	C	Wisconsin	
5	126	Dallas Cowboys	John Kelsey	T	Missouri	
5	127	Cincinnati Bengals	Richard Bishop	DT	Louisville	
5	128	Atlanta Falcons	Monroe Eley	RB	Arizona State	from Los Angeles via Minnesota thorough Philadelphia
5	129	Baltimore Colts	Doug Nettles	CB	Vanderbilt	from Minnesota
5	130	Miami Dolphins	Cleveland Vann	LB	Oklahoma State	
6	131	Kansas City Chiefs	Jim Washington	RB	Clemson	from Houston via New Orleans
6	132	New York Giants	Jim Pietrzak	T	Eastern Michigan	
6	133	San Diego Chargers	Jesse Freitas III	QB	San Diego State	
6	134	Green Bay Packers	Don Woods	RB	New Mexico	from Chicago
6	135	New York Jets	Bill Wyman	C	Texas	
6	136	Miami Dolphins	Randy Crowder	DE	Penn State	from Baltimore
6	137	New York Jets	Wayne Jones	RB	Mississippi State	from St. Louis
6	138	San Francisco 49ers	Mike Raines	DT	Alabama	
6	139	Detroit Lions	Willie Burden	RB	NC State	
6	140	Baltimore Colts	Danny Rhodes	LB	Arkansas	from New England
6	141	New England Patriots	Chuck Ramsey	K	Wake Forest	from Philadelphia
6	142	Green Bay Packers	Ken Payne	WR	Langston	
6	143	Detroit Lions	Jim Davis	G	Alcorn A&M	
6	144	Washington Redskins	Jon Keyworth	TE	Colorado	from Kansas City
6	145	Denver Broncos	John Winesberry	WR	Stanford	
6	146	Cleveland Browns	Billy Pritchett	RB	West Texas State	from Buffalo
6	147	Atlanta Falcons	Doyle Orange	RB	Southern Miss	
6	148	Oakland Raiders	James McAlister	RB	UCLA	
6	149	Pittsburgh Steelers	Jim Wolf	DE	Prairie View A&M	from Cleveland via Denver
6	150	Pittsburgh Steelers	Rick Druschel	G	NC State	
6	151	Dallas Cowboys	Jim Bright	S	UCLA	
6	152	Cincinnati Bengals	Robin Sinclair	DB	Washington State	from Washington via New Orleans
6	153	Cincinnati Bengals	Bill Bryant	CB	Grambling	
6	154	Houston Oilers	Booker Brown	G	USC	from Los Angeles
6	155	Minnesota Vikings	Mark Kellar	RB	Northern Illinois	
6	156	Miami Dolphins	Bob Wolfe	T	Nebraska	
7	157	Houston Oilers	Leonard Fairley	CB	Alcorn A&M	
7	158	Los Angeles Rams	John Harvey	RB	Texas–Arlington	from San Diego
7	159	New York Giants	Marty Woolbright	TE	South Carolina	
7	160	Chicago Bears	Jack Ettinger	WR	Arkansas	
7	161	Baltimore Colts	Noah Jackson	G	Tampa	
7	162	New York Jets	Burney Veazey	TE	Ole Miss	
7	163	Cleveland Browns	Bob Herrick	WR	Purdue	from St. Louis
7	164	Miami Dolphins	Carl Swierc	WR	Rice	from New Orleans
7	165	Pittsburgh Steelers	Allen Sitterle	T	NC State	from New England
7	166	San Francisco 49ers	Kermit Johnson	RB	UCLA	
7	167	Philadelphia Eagles	Willie Cullars	DE	Kansas State	
7	168	Green Bay Packers	Bart Purvis	T	Maryland	
7	169	Detroit Lions	Efrén Herrera ^{†}	K	UCLA	
7	170	Baltimore Colts	Dan Dickel	LB	Iowa	from Denver
7	171	Cleveland Browns	Gerry Sullivan	T	Illinois	
7	172	Kansas City Chiefs	Leroy Hegge	DE	South Dakota–Springfield	
7	173	Atlanta Falcons	Jim Coode	T	Michigan	
7	174	Baltimore Colts	Freddie Scott	WR	Amherst	from Buffalo
7	175	Oakland Raiders	Rod Garcia	K	Stanford	
7	176	Dallas Cowboys	Raymond Nester	LB	Michigan State	
7	177	Cincinnati Bengals	Ken Sawyer	S	Syracuse	
7	178	New England Patriots	Maury Damkroger	LB	Nebraska	from Washington
7	179	Pittsburgh Steelers	Scott Garske	TE	Eastern Washington	
7	180	Washington Redskins	Mike Varty	LB	Northwestern	from Los Angeles
7	181	Minnesota Vikings	Fred Tabron	RB	Southwest Missouri State	
7	182	Miami Dolphins	Joe Sullivan	G	Boston College	
8	183	Houston Oilers	Mike McCoy	DB	Western Kentucky	
8	184	New York Giants	Ezil Bibbs	DE	Grambling	
8	185	San Diego Chargers	Tom Forrest	G	Cincinnati	
8	186	Chicago Bears	Alan Chadwick	QB	East Tennessee State	
8	187	New York Jets	Greg Gantt	K	Alabama	
8	188	Baltimore Colts	Greg Latta	TE	Morgan State	
8	189	St. Louis Cardinals	Sergio Albert	K	U.S. International	
8	190	Chicago Bears	Ken Grandberry	RB	Washington State	from New England
8	191	San Francisco 49ers	Jim Schnietz	G	Missouri	
8	192	New York Jets	Larry Lightfoot	RB	Livingston (AL)	from New Orleans
8	193	Philadelphia Eagles	Robert Woods	LB	Howard Payne	
8	194	Green Bay Packers	Monte Doris	LB	USC	
8	195	Detroit Lions	Mike Denimarck	LB	Emporia State	
8	196	Washington Redskins	Darwin Robinson	RB	Dakota State	from Cleveland
8	197	New York Jets	Ron Rydalch	DT	Utah	from Kansas City
8	198	Baltimore Colts	Paul Miles	RB	Bowling Green	from Denver
8	199	Cleveland Browns	Eddie Brown	S	Tennessee	from Buffalo
8	200	Green Bay Packers	Ned Guillet	DB	Boston College	from Atlanta via New Orleans
8	201	New Orleans Saints	Alvin Maxson	RB	SMU	from Oakland
8	202	Cincinnati Bengals	John McDaniel	WR	Lincoln (MO)	
8	203	Buffalo Bills	Greg Hare	QB	Ohio State	from Washington
8	204	Pittsburgh Steelers	Mark Gefert	LB	Purdue	
8	205	Dallas Cowboys	Mike Holt	DB	Michigan State	
8	206	San Diego Chargers	Bon Boatwright	T	Oklahoma State	from Los Angeles
8	207	Minnesota Vikings	Berl Simmons	K	TCU	
8	208	Miami Dolphins	Melvin Baker	WR	Texas Southern	
9	209	New England Patriots	Ed McCartney	LB	Northeastern State	
9	210	San Diego Chargers	Danny Colbert	DB	Tulsa	
9	211	New York Giants	Jim Rathje	RB	Northern Michigan	
9	212	Miami Dolphins	Tom Wickert	G	Washington State	from Chicago
9	213	Los Angeles Rams	Don Hutt	WR	Boise State	from Baltimore via Washington
9	214	New York Jets	Bob Burns	RB	Georgia	
9	215	St. Louis Cardinals	Reggie Harrison	RB	Cincinnati	
9	216	San Francisco 49ers	Manfred Moore	RB	USC	
9	217	New Orleans Saints	Phil LaPorta	T	Penn State	
9	218	Washington Redskins	Mark Sens	DE	Colorado	from New England
9	219	Philadelphia Eagles	Mark Sheridan	WR	Holy Cross	
9	220	Green Bay Packers	Harold Holton	G	UTEP	
9	221	Los Angeles Rams	Derek Williams	DB	UC Riverside	from Detroit
9	222	Kansas City Chiefs	Jim Jennings	RB	Rutgers	
9	223	Pittsburgh Steelers	Tommy Reamon	RB	Missouri	from Denver
9	224	Cleveland Browns	Dan Scott	G	Ohio State	
9	225	Atlanta Falcons	Larry Bailey	DT	Pacific	
9	226	Buffalo Bills	Brian Doherty	P	Notre Dame	
9	227	Oakland Raiders	Kenith Pope	DB	Oklahoma	
9	228	Washington Redskins	Mike Flater	K	Colorado Mines	
9	229	Pittsburgh Steelers	Charlie Davis	DT	TCU	
9	230	Dallas Cowboys	Bill Dulin	T	Johnson C. Smith	
9	231	Cincinnati Bengals	Edward Johnson	DE	SMU	
9	232	Minnesota Vikings	Sam McCullum	WR	Montana State	
9	233	Washington Redskins	Jimmie Kennedy	TE	Colorado State	from Los Angeles
9	234	Miami Dolphins	Bob Lally	LB	Cornell	
10	235	New Orleans Saints	Frosty Anderson	WR	Nebraska	from Houston
10	236	New York Giants	Ray Rhodes	WR	Tulsa	
10	237	San Diego Chargers	John Ketchoyian	LB	Santa Clara	
10	238	Cleveland Browns	Mike Puestow	WR	North Dakota State	from Chicago
10	239	New York Jets	Sam Baker	G	Georgia	
10	240	Baltimore Colts	Bob Van Duyne	G	Idaho	
10	241	Buffalo Bills	Art Cameron	TE	Albany State	from St. Louis
10	242	New Orleans Saints	Tommy Thibodeaux	G	Tulane	
10	243	Pittsburgh Steelers	Jim Kregel	G	Ohio State	from New England
10	244	San Francisco 49ers	Glen Gaspard	LB	Texas	
10	245	Philadelphia Eagles	Phil Polak	RB	Bowling Green	
10	246	Green Bay Packers	Doug Troszak	DT	Michigan	
10	247	Detroit Lions	David Wooley	RB	Central State (OK)	
10	248	Denver Broncos	Charlie Johnson	DB	Southern	
10	249	Buffalo Bills	Don Calhoun	RB	Kansas State	from Cleveland
10	250	Kansas City Chiefs	Tom Condon	G	Boston College	
10	251	St. Louis Cardinals	Greg Hartle	LB	Newberry	from Buffalo via Denver
10	252	Atlanta Falcons	Paul Ryczek	C	Virginia	
10	253	Oakland Raiders	Chris Arnold	DB	Virginia State	
10	254	Pittsburgh Steelers	Dave Atkinson	S	BYU	
10	255	Dallas Cowboys	Dennis Morgan	RB	Western Illinois	
10	256	Cincinnati Bengals	Chuck Herd	TE	Penn State	
10	257	Baltimore Colts	Glenn Ellis	DT	Elon	from Los Angeles
10	258	Washington Redskins	Johnny Vann	DB	South Dakota	
10	259	Minnesota Vikings	Barry Reed	RB	Peru State	
10	260	Miami Dolphins	Gary Valbuena	QB	Tennessee	
11	261	Houston Oilers	Steve Taylor	C	Auburn	
11	262	San Diego Chargers	Dave Grannell	TE	Arizona State	
11	263	New York Giants	Bobby Brooks	DB	Bishop	
11	264	Chicago Bears	Norm Hodgins	DB	LSU	
11	265	Baltimore Colts	Tim Rudnick	DB	Notre Dame	
11	266	New York Jets	Eugene Bird	DB	Southern Miss	
11	267	New York Jets	William Buckley	WR	Mississippi State	from St. Louis
11	268	New England Patriots	Archie Gibson	RB	Utah State	
11	269	San Francisco 49ers	Greg Battle	DB	Colorado State	
11	270	New Orleans Saints	Kent Merritt	WR	Virginia	
11	271	Philadelphia Eagles	Bill Brittain	C	Kansas State	
11	272	Green Bay Packers	Eric Torkelson	RB	Connecticut	
11	273	Detroit Lions	T. C. Blair	TE	Tulsa	
11	274	Cleveland Browns	Tom Gooden	K	Harding	
11	275	Kansas City Chiefs	Bob Thornbladh	RB	Michigan	
11	276	Denver Broncos	Steve Buchanan	RB	Holy Cross	
11	277	Atlanta Falcons	Eddie Wilson	WR	Albany State	
11	278	Buffalo Bills	Rod Kirby	LB	Pittsburgh	
11	279	Oakland Raiders	Harold Hart	RB	Texas Southern	
11	280	Dallas Cowboys	Harvey McGee	WR	Southern Miss	
11	281	Cincinnati Bengals	Ed Kezirian	T	UCLA	
11	282	Washington Redskins	Joe Miller	T	Villanova	
11	283	Pittsburgh Steelers	Dickey Morton	RB	Arkansas	
11	284	Los Angeles Rams	Rick Hayes	T	Washington	
11	285	Minnesota Vikings	David Boone	DE	Eastern Michigan	
11	286	Miami Dolphins	Gerry Roberts	DE	UCLA	
12	287	Houston Oilers	Ricky Browne	LB	Florida	
12	288	New York Giants	James Sims	DB	USC	
12	289	San Diego Chargers	Sam Williams	DB	California	
12	290	Chicago Bears	Jeff Sevy	DT	California	
12	291	New York Jets	John Ricca	DE	Duke	
12	292	Baltimore Colts	Dave Simonson	T	Minnesota	
12	293	St. Louis Cardinals	Roger Wallace	WR	Bowling Green	
12	294	San Francisco 49ers	Tom Hull	LB	Penn State	
12	295	New Orleans Saints	Jim Buckmon	DE	Pittsburgh	
12	296	New England Patriots	Eddie Foster	T	Oklahoma	
12	297	Philadelphia Eagles	Artimus Parker	DB	USC	
12	298	Green Bay Packers	Randy Walker	K	Northwestern State	
12	299	Detroit Lions	Mark Wakefield	WR	Tampa	
12	300	Kansas City Chiefs	Carl Brown	WR	West Texas State	
12	301	Denver Broncos	Larry Cameron	LB	Alcorn A&M	
12	302	Cleveland Browns	Ron McNeil	DE	North Carolina Central	
12	303	Buffalo Bills	Dave Means	DE	Southeast Missouri State	
12	304	Atlanta Falcons	Vic Koegel	LB	Ohio State	
12	305	Atlanta Falcons	Noe Gonzalez	RB	Southwest Texas State	
12	306	Cincinnati Bengals	Rudy McClinton	DB	Xavier	
12	307	Baltimore Colts	Bob Bobrowski	QB	Purdue	from Washington
12	308	Pittsburgh Steelers	Hugh Lickiss	LB	Simpson (IA)	
12	309	Dallas Cowboys	Keith Bobo	QB	SMU	
12	310	Los Angeles Rams	Roger Freberg	G	UCLA	
12	311	Minnesota Vikings	Randy Poltl	DB	Stanford	
12	312	Miami Dolphins	Jim Revels	DB	Florida	

=== Round 13 ===
Pick #	NFL team	Player	Position	College
313	Houston Oilers	Dan Dixon	Guard	Boise State
314	San Diego Chargers	Brian Vertefeuille	Tackle	Idaho State
315	New York Giants	Dennis Colvin	Tackle	Southwest Texas State
316	Chicago Bears	Joe Barnes	Quarterback	Texas Tech
317	Baltimore Colts	Randy Hall	Defensive back	Idaho
318	New York Jets	John Tate	Linebacker	Jackson State
319	St. Louis Cardinals	Jimmy Poulos	Running back	Georgia
320	New Orleans Saints	Mike Truax	Linebacker	Tulane
321	New England Patriots	Phil Bennett	Running back	Boston College
322	San Francisco 49ers	Tom Owen	Quarterback	Wichita State
323	Philadelphia Eagles	Lars Ditlev	Defensive end	South Dakota Tech
324	Green Bay Packers	Emmanuel Armstrong	Linebacker	San Jose State
325	Detroit Lions	Fred Rothwell	Center	Kansas State
326	Denver Broncos	John Clerkley	Defensive tackle	Fort Valley State
327	Cleveland Browns	Mike Seifert	Defensive end	Wisconsin
328	Kansas City Chiefs	Norm Romagnoli	Linebacker	Kentucky State
329	Atlanta Falcons	Ralph Powell	Running back	Nebraska
330	Oakland Raiders	Mike Dennery	Linebacker	Southern Mississippi
331	Buffalo Bills	Ed Gatewood	Linebacker	Tennessee State
332	Washington Redskins	Stu O'Dell	Linebacker	Indiana
333	Pittsburgh Steelers	Frank Kolch	Quarterback	Eastern Michigan
334	Dallas Cowboys	Fred Lima	Kicker	Colorado
335	Cincinnati Bengals	Ted Jornov	Linebacker	Iowa State
336	Los Angeles Rams	Pete Solverson	Tackle	Drake
337	Minnesota Vikings	Gary Keller	Defensive tackle	Utah
338	Miami Dolphins	Clayton Heath	Running back	Wake Forest

=== Round 14 ===
Pick #	NFL team	Player	Position	College
339	Buffalo Bills	Phil Lamm	Defensive back	North Carolina
340	New York Giants	Mike Hayes	Tackle	Virginia State
341	San Diego Chargers	Greg Bailey	Defensive back	Long Beach State
342	Chicago Bears	Paul Vellano	Defensive tackle	Maryland
343	New York Jets	Greg Fountain	Guard	Mississippi State
344	Baltimore Colts	Ed Collins	Wide receiver	Rice
345	St. Louis Cardinals	Charles Smith	Running back	Yankton
346	New England Patriots	Cecil Bowens	Running back	Kentucky
347	San Francisco 49ers	Walt Williamson	Defensive end	Michigan
348	New Orleans Saints	Kent Marshall	Defensive back	Texas Christian
349	Philadelphia Eagles	Dave Smith	Linebacker	Oklahoma
350	Green Bay Packers	Andrew Neloms	Defensive tackle	Kentucky State
351	Detroit Lions	David Jones	Defensive back	Howard Payne
352	Cleveland Browns	Bob Hunt	Running back	Heidelberg
353	Kansas City Chiefs	Frank Pomarico	Guard	Notre Dame
354	Denver Broncos	Rich Marks	Defensive back	Northern Illinois
355	Buffalo Bills	Phil Gurbada	Defensive back	Mayville
356	Atlanta Falcons	John Givens	Guard	Villanova
357	Oakland Raiders	Don Willingham	Running back	Wisconsin–Milwaukee
358	Pittsburgh Steelers	Bruce Henley	Defensive back	Rice
359	Dallas Cowboys	Doug Richards	Defensive back	Brigham Young
360	Cincinnati Bengals	Mike Phillips	Tackle	Cornell
361	Washington Redskins	Don Van Galder	Quarterback	Utah
362	Los Angeles Rams	Ananias Carson	Wide receiver	Langston
363	Minnesota Vikings	Alan Dixon	Running back	Harding
364	Miami Dolphins	Sam Johnson	Linebacker	Arizona State

=== Round 15 ===
Pick #	NFL team	Player	Position	College
365	Houston Oilers	Billy Johnson	Wide receiver	Widener
366	San Diego Chargers	Charles Anthony	Linebacker	USC
367	New York Giants	Larry Jones	Wide receiver	N.E. Missouri
368	Chicago Bears	Oliver Alexander	Tight end	Grambling
369	Baltimore Colts	Pat Kelly	Linebacker	Richmond
370	New York Jets	Willie Brister	Tight end	Southern
371	St. Louis Cardinals	Vince Ancell	Defensive back	Arkansas State
372	San Francisco 49ers	Leonard Gray	Tight end	Long Beach State
373	New Orleans Saints	Larry Cipa	Quarterback	Michigan
374	New England Patriots	Sam Hunt	Linebacker	Stephen F. Austin
375	Philadelphia Eagles	Sid Bond	Tackle	Texas Christian
376	Green Bay Packers	Dave Wannstedt	Tackle	Pittsburgh
377	Detroit Lions	John Wells	Guard	Kansas State
378	Kansas City Chiefs	Lem Burnham	Linebacker	U.S. International
379	Denver Broncos	Peil Pennington	Quarterback	Massachusetts
380	Cleveland Browns	Ransom Terrell	Linebacker	Arizona
381	Atlanta Falcons	Willie Jones	Wide receiver	Iowa State
382	Buffalo Bills	Ken Williams	Linebacker	Southwestern Louisiana
383	Oakland Raiders	Greg Mathis	Defensive back	Idaho State
384	Dallas Cowboys	Bruce Craft	Tackle	Geneva
385	Cincinnati Bengals	Isaac Jackson	Running back	Kansas State
386	San Diego Chargers	Greg Meczka	Tight end	Bowling Green
387	Pittsburgh Steelers	Larry Hunt	Defensive tackle	Iowa State
388	Los Angeles Rams	Bob Thomas	Kicker	Notre Dame
389	Minnesota Vikings	Kurt Wachtler	Defensive tackle	St. John's
390	Miami Dolphins	Larry Gates	Defensive back	Western Michigan

=== Round 16 ===
Pick #	NFL team	Player	Position	College
391	Houston Oilers	Matthew Williams	Running back	N.E. Louisiana
392	New York Giants	Buddy Brown	Guard	Alabama
393	San Diego Chargers	Neal Skarin	Defensive end	Arizona State
394	Chicago Bears	Randy Geist	Defensive back	Colorado
395	New York Jets	Jazz Jackson	Running back	Western Kentucky
396	Baltimore Colts	Dave Margavage	Tackle	Kentucky
397	St. Louis Cardinals	Alonzo Emery	Running back	Arizona State
398	New Orleans Saints	Don Coleman	Linebacker	Michigan
399	New England Patriots	Lucious Selmon	Defensive tackle	Oklahoma
400	San Francisco 49ers	Jack Conners	Defensive back	Oregon
401	Philadelphia Eagles	Jim Smith	Linebacker	Monmouth
402	Green Bay Packers	Mark Cooney	Linebacker	Colorado
403	Detroit Lions	Myron Wilson	Defensive back	Bowling Green
404	Denver Broncos	Darrell Austin	Tackle	South Carolina
405	Kansas City Chiefs	Barry Beers	Guard	William & Mary
406	Buffalo Bills	Sanford Qvale	Tackle	North Dakota State
407	Cleveland Browns	Preston Anderson	Defensive back	Rice
408	Atlanta Falcons	Sylvester McGee	Running back	Rhode Island
409	Oakland Raiders	Delario Robinson	Wide receiver	Kansas
410	Cincinnati Bengals	Darryl Bishop	Defensive back	Kentucky
411	Washington Redskins	Nate Anderson	Running back	Eastern Illinois
412	Pittsburgh Steelers	Octavus Morgan	Linebacker	Illinois
413	Dallas Cowboys	Gene Killian	Guard	Tennessee
414	Los Angeles Rams	Dave Ottmar	Punter	Stanford
415	Minnesota Vikings	John Goebel	Running back	St. Thomas
416	Miami Dolphins	Jessie Wolf	Defensive tackle	Prairie View A&M

=== Round 17 ===
Pick #	NFL team	Player	Position	College
417	Houston Oilers	Bill Hedge	Tackle	Northeast Missouri
418	San Diego Chargers	Charles DeJurnett	Defensive tackle	San Jose State
419	New York Giants	Steve Crosby	Running back	Fort Hays State
420	Chicago Bears	Craig Holland	Quarterback	Texas-Arlington
421	Baltimore Colts	Tim Berra	Wide receiver	Massachusetts
422	New York Jets	Doug Lowrey	Guard	Arkansas State
423	St. Louis Cardinals	John Moseley	Defensive back	Missouri
424	New England Patriots	Gary Hudson	Defensive back	Boston College
425	San Francisco 49ers	Levi Stanley	Guard	Hawaii
426	New Orleans Saints	Marvin Williams	Wide receiver	Western Illinois
427	Philadelphia Eagles	Cliff Brown	Running back	Notre Dame
428	Green Bay Packers	Randy Woodfield	Wide receiver	Portland State
429	Detroit Lions	Collis Temple	Defensive end	Louisiana State
430	Cleveland Browns	Carlton Buchanan	Defensive tackle	SW Oklahoma State
431	Kansas City Chiefs	David Langner	Defensive back	Auburn
432	Denver Broncos	Boyd Brown	Tight end	Alcorn A&M
433	Atlanta Falcons	Al Davis	Guard	Boise State
434	Buffalo Bills	Sal Casola	Kicker	Cincinnati
435	Oakland Raiders	James Morris	Defensive tackle	Missouri Valley College
436	Baltimore Colts	Buzzy Lewis	Defensive back	Florida State
437	Pittsburgh Steelers	Larry Moore	Defensive end	Angelo State
438	Dallas Cowboys	Lawrie Skolrood	Tackle	North Dakota
439	Cincinnati Bengals	Jim Smith	Running back	North Carolina Central
440	Los Angeles Rams	Willie Townsend	Wide receiver	Notre Dame
441	Minnesota Vikings	Earl Garrett	Defensive back	Boston State College
442	Miami Dolphins	Ken Dickerson	Defensive back	Tuskegee

== Notable undrafted players ==
^{†}	Pro Bowler	^{‡}	Hall of Famer

Original NFL team	Player	Pos.	College	Notes
Atlanta Falcons	Alfred Jenkins ^{†}	WR	Morris Brown	
Atlanta Falcons	Rick Byas	CB	Wayne State	
Atlanta Falcons	Rick Danmeier	K	Sioux Falls	
Atlanta Falcons	Glenn Hyde	G	Pittsburgh	
Buffalo Bills	Nick Nighswander	C	Morehead State	
Chicago Bears	Mike Hoban	G	Michigan	
Chicago Bears	Bill Knox	DB	Purdue	
Chicago Bears	Fred Pagac	TE	Ohio State	
Cleveland Browns	Will Cureton	QB	Texas A&M–Commerce	
Dallas Cowboys	Doug Dennison	RB	Kutztown	
Dallas Cowboys	Bill Houston	WR	Jackson State	
Dallas Cowboys	Ron Howard	TE	Seattle	
Dallas Cowboys	Louie Walker	LB	Colorado State	
Dallas Cowboys	Gerard Williams	CB	Langston	
Denver Broncos	R.W. Hicks	C	Humboldt State	
Houston Oilers	Ronnie Coleman	RB	Alabama A&M	
Houston Oilers	Dave Jennings ^{†}	P	St. Lawrence	
Houston Oilers	Ernie Kirk	DE	Howard Payne	
Houston Oilers	Greg Stemrick ^{†}	CB	Colorado State	
Houston Oilers	Terry Wells	RB	Southern Miss	
Houston Oilers	C. L. Whittington	S	Prairie View A&M	
Kansas City Chiefs	Cleo Miller	RB	Arkansas–Pine Bluff	
Los Angeles Rams	Rich Baska	LB	UCLA	
Los Angeles Rams	Dieter Brock	QB	Jacksonville State	
Miami Dolphins	Emanuel Zanders	G	Jackson State	
New England Patriots	Deac Sanders	DB	South Dakota	
New York Giants	Karl Chandler	G	Princeton	
New York Giants	Joe Pisarcik	QB	New Mexico State	
New York Giants	Bob Schmit	LB	Nebraska	
New York Jets	Steve Colavito	LB	Wake Forest	
New York Jets	J. J. Jones	QB	Fisk	
New York Jets	Steve Reese	LB	Louisville	
Oakland Raiders	Jim Weatherly	C	Mt. San Antonio College	
Philadelphia Eagles	Merritt Kersey	P	West Chester	
Pittsburgh Steelers	Richard Conn	S	Georgia	
Pittsburgh Steelers	Randy Grossman	TE	Temple	
Pittsburgh Steelers	Marv Kellum	LB	Wichita State	
Pittsburgh Steelers	Doug Kotar	RB	Kentucky	
Pittsburgh Steelers	Donnie Shell^{‡}^{†}	S	South Carolina State	
St. Louis Cardinals	Keith Denson	WR	San Diego State	
San Diego Chargers	Glen Bonner	RB	Washington	

== Hall of Famers ==
- Jack Lambert, linebacker from Kent State, taken 2nd round 46th overall by Pittsburgh Steelers

Inducted: Professional Football Hall of Fame class of 1990.

- Mike Webster, center from Wisconsin, taken 5th round 125th overall by Pittsburgh Steelers

Inducted: Professional Football Hall of Fame class of 1997.

- Lynn Swann, wide receiver from Southern California, taken 1st round 21st overall by Pittsburgh Steelers

Inducted: Professional Football Hall of Fame class of 2001.

- Dave Casper, tight end from Notre Dame, taken 2nd round 45th overall by Oakland Raiders

Inducted: Professional Football Hall of Fame class of 2002.

- John Stallworth, wide receiver from Alabama A&M, taken 4th round 82nd overall by Pittsburgh Steelers

Inducted: Professional Football Hall of Fame class of 2002.

- Donnie Shell, safety from South Carolina State, undrafted and signed by Pittsburgh Steelers

Inducted: Professional Football Hall of Fame class of 2020.

- Randy Gradishar, linebacker from Ohio State, taken 1st round 14th overall by Denver Broncos

Inducted: Professional Football Hall of Fame class of 2024.
