= 1974 Denver Broncos season =

American football team season

- Owner: Gerald Phipps
- General manager: John Ralston
- Head coach: John Ralston
- Home stadium: Mile High Stadium

Results
- Record: 7–6–1
- Division place: 2nd AFC West
- Playoffs: Did not qualify

The 1974 Denver Broncos season was the team's 15th year in professional football and its fifth with the National Football League (NFL). Led by third-year head coach and general manager John Ralston, the Broncos had a winning record for the second straight season with seven wins, six losses, and one tie, which was fifth-best in the conference.

Denver finished second in the AFC West, but 4½ games behind the Oakland Raiders, who clinched in mid-November, and 1½ games behind the wild card Buffalo Bills. In their fifteen years of existence, the Broncos had yet to reach the postseason.

The team played at Detroit on Thanksgiving and won in the final NFL game at Tiger Stadium; the Lions moved north to the Pontiac Silverdome in 1975.

== Offseason ==
=== NFL draft ===
1974 Denver Broncos draft
| Round | Pick | Player | Position | College | Notes |
| 1 | 14 | Randy Gradishar * ^{†} | LB | Ohio State | |
| 2 | 42 | Carl Wafer | DT | Tennessee State | |
| 3 | 68 | Claudie Minor | T | San Diego State | |
| 4 | 92 | Ozell Collie | DB | Colorado | |
| 6 | 145 | John Winesberry | WR | Stanford | |
| 10 | 248 | Charlie Johnson | DB | Southern | |
| 11 | 276 | Steve Buchanan | RB | Holy Cross | |
| 12 | 301 | Larry Cameron | LB | Alcorn A&M | |
| 13 | 326 | John Clerkley | DT | Fort Valley State | |
| 14 | 354 | Rich Marks | DB | Northern Illinois | |
| 15 | 379 | Peil Pennington | QB | Massachusetts | |
| 16 | 404 | Darrell Austin | T | South Carolina | |
| 17 | 432 | Boyd Brown | TE | Alcorn A&M | |
Made roster † Pro Football Hall of Fame * Made at least one Pro Bowl during career

== Personnel ==
=== Staff / Coaches ===
1974 Denver Broncos staff
| Front office: Team Owner / Chairman of the Board – Gerald Phipps; Team President – Allan Phipps; Assistant General Manager/Director of Player Personnel – Fred Gehrke; Director of Scouting – Carroll Hardy; Head coaches: Vice President/General Manager/Head Coach – John Ralston; Offensive coaches: Offensive Coordinator/Offensive Backfield – Max Coley; Wide Receivers – Kay Dalton; Offensive Line – Jerry Frei | Defensive coaches: Defensive Coordinator – Joe Collier; Defensive Line – Doc Urich; Defensive Backs – Bob Gambold; Special teams coaches: Special Teams/Linebackers – Myrel Moore |

=== Roster ===
1974 Denver Broncos roster
| Quarterbacks (QB): 16 John Hufnagel; 12 Charley Johnson; 10 Steve Ramsey; Running backs (RB): 24 Otis Armstrong; 44 Floyd Little; 22 Fran Lynch; 30 Oliver Ross; Wide receivers (WR): 25 Haven Moses; 80 Jerry Simmons; 82 Otto Stowe; 42 Billy Van Heusen P; Tight ends (TE): 87 Boyd Brown; 81 Billy Masters; 88 Riley Odoms | Offensive linemen (OL): 65 LeFrancis Arnold G/C; 74 Mike Current T; 60 Paul Howard G; 68 Larron Jackson G; 61 Tommy Lyons G; 50 Bobby Maples C; 71 Claudie Minor T; 64 Mike Schnitker G; Defensive linemen (DL): 77 Lyle Alzado DE; 79 Barney Chavous DE; 76 Steve Coleman DE; 55 Pete Duranko DT; 63 John Grant DT; 72 Bob Kampa DT; 75 Ed Smith DE/DT; 70 Paul Smith DT | Linebackers (LB): 54 Ralph Cindrich OLB; 53 Ken Criter MLB; 52 Randy Gradishar MLB; 57 Tom Jackson OLB; 45 Bill Laskey OLB; 56 Ray May OLB; 66 Jim O'Malley OLB; 59 Joe Rizzo OLB; 51 Mike Simone OLB; Defensive backs (DB): 20 Charlie Greer FS; 43 Lonnie Hepburn CB; 26 Calvin Jones CB; 48 John Pitts FS; 46 John Rowser CB; 36 Bill Thompson SS; 23 Maurice Tyler SS; Special teams (ST): 15 Jim Turner K | Reserve: 11 Bobby Anderson RB (IR); 86 Marv Frazier WR (IR); 78 Marv Montgomery T (IR); Rookies in italics 48 active, 3 reserve, 0 practice squad |

== Regular season ==
=== Schedule ===
| Week | Date | Opponent | Result | Record | Venue | Attendance | Recap |
|---|---|---|---|---|---|---|---|
| 1 | September 15 | Los Angeles Rams | **L** 10–17 | 0–1 | Mile High Stadium | 51,121 | Recap |
| 2 | September 22 | Pittsburgh Steelers | **T** 35–35 (OT) | 0–1–1 | Mile High Stadium | 51,068 | Recap |
| 3 | September 30 | at Washington Redskins | **L** 3–30 | 0–2–1 | RFK Stadium | 54,395 | Recap |
| 4 | October 6 | at **Kansas City Chiefs** | **W** 17–14 | 1–2–1 | Arrowhead Stadium | 67,298 | Recap |
| 5 | October 13 | New Orleans Saints | **W** 33–17 | 2–2–1 | Mile High Stadium | 50,881 | Recap |
| 6 | October 20 | **San Diego Chargers** | **W** 27–7 | 3–2–1 | Mile High Stadium | 50,928 | Recap |
| 7 | October 27 | at Cleveland Browns | **L** 21–23 | 3–3–1 | Cleveland Stadium | 60,478 | Recap |
| 8 | November 3 | **Oakland Raiders** | **L** 17–28 | 3–4–1 | Mile High Stadium | 45,946 | Recap |
| 9 | November 10 | at Baltimore Colts | **W** 17–6 | 4–4–1 | Memorial Stadium | 33,244 | Recap |
| 10 | November 18 | **Kansas City Chiefs** | **L** 34–42 | 4–5–1 | Mile High Stadium | 50,236 | Recap |
| 11 | November 24 | at **Oakland Raiders** | **W** 20–17 | 5–5–1 | Oakland–Alameda County Coliseum | 51,224 | Recap |
| 12 | November 28 | at Detroit Lions | **W** 31–27 | 6–5–1 | Tiger Stadium | 51,157 | Recap |
| 13 | December 8 | Houston Oilers | **W** 37–14 | 7–5–1 | Mile High Stadium | 46,942 | Recap |
| 14 | December 15 | at **San Diego Chargers** | **L** 0–17 | 7–6–1 | San Diego Stadium | 36,571 | Recap |
Note: Intra-division opponents are in **bold** text.

Thursday (November 28: Thanksgiving)

=== Standings ===
AFC West
| | W | L | T | PCT | DIV | CONF | PF | PA | STK |
|---|---|---|---|---|---|---|---|---|---|
| Oakland Raiders | 12 | 2 | 0 | .857 | 5–1 | 9–2 | 355 | 228 | W3 |
| Denver Broncos | 7 | 6 | 1 | .536 | 3–3 | 5–4–1 | 302 | 294 | L1 |
| Kansas City Chiefs | 5 | 9 | 0 | .357 | 2–4 | 4–7 | 233 | 293 | L2 |
| San Diego Chargers | 5 | 9 | 0 | .357 | 2–4 | 4–7 | 212 | 285 | W2 |
