= 1973 Nebraska Cornhuskers football team =

American college football season

1973 Nebraska Cornhuskers football

Cotton Bowl Classic champion

Cotton Bowl Classic, W 19–3 vs. Texas
- Conference: Big Eight Conference

Ranking
- Coaches: No. T–11
- AP: No. 7
- Record: 9–2–1 (4–2–1 Big 8)
- Head coach: Tom Osborne (1st season)
- Offensive scheme: I formation
- Defensive coordinator: Monte Kiffin (5th season)
- Base defense: 5–2
- Home stadium: Memorial Stadium

1973 Big Eight Conference football standings
	Conf.					Overall
Team	W		L		T	W		L		T
No. 3 Oklahoma $	7	–	0	–	0	10	–	0	–	1
No. 7 Nebraska	4	–	2	–	1	9	–	2	–	1
No. 18 Kansas	4	–	2	–	1	7	–	4	–	1
No. 17 Missouri	3	–	4	–	0	8	–	4	–	0
Oklahoma State	2	–	3	–	2	5	–	4	–	2
Colorado	2	–	5	–	0	5	–	6	–	0
Kansas State	2	–	5	–	0	5	–	6	–	0
Iowa State	2	–	5	–	0	4	–	7	–	0
$ – Conference champion; Rankings from AP Poll

The 1973 Nebraska Cornhuskers football team represented the University of Nebraska–Lincoln in the 1973 NCAA Division I football season. The team was coached by Tom Osborne and played their home games in Memorial Stadium in Lincoln.

== Schedule ==
Date	Time	Opponent	Rank	Site	TV	Result	Attendance	Source
September 8	3:50 pm	No. 10 UCLA*	No. 4	Memorial Stadium; Lincoln, NE	ABC	W 40–13	74,966	
September 22	1:30 pm	No. 14 NC State*	No. 2	Memorial Stadium; Lincoln, NE		W 31–14	75,925	
September 29	1:30 pm	Wisconsin*	No. 2	Memorial Stadium; Lincoln, NE (rivalry)		W 20–16	76,279	
October 6	1:30 pm	at Minnesota*	No. 2	Memorial Stadium; Minneapolis, MN (rivalry)		W 48–7	58,091	
October 13	1:30 pm	at Missouri	No. 2	Faurot Field; Columbia, MO (rivalry)		L 12–13	68,170	
October 20	1:30 pm	No. 18 Kansas^{†}	No. 11	Memorial Stadium; Lincoln, NE (rivalry)		W 10–9	76,498	
October 27	1:30 pm	at Oklahoma State	No. 10	Lewis Field; Stillwater, OK		T 17–17	50,500	
November 3	1:30 pm	No. 17 Colorado	No. 13	Memorial Stadium; Lincoln, NE (rivalry)		W 28–16	76,555	
November 10	1:30 pm	Iowa State	No. 11	Memorial Stadium; Lincoln, NE (rivalry)		W 31–7	76,503	
November 17	1:30 pm	at Kansas State	No. 10	KSU Stadium; Manhattan, KS (rivalry)		W 50–21	42,000	
November 23	1:20 pm	at No. 3 Oklahoma	No. 10	Oklahoma Memorial Stadium; Norman, OK (rivalry)	ABC	L 0–27	61,826	
January 1, 1974	1:10 pm	vs. No. 8 Texas*	No. 12	Cotton Bowl; Dallas, TX (Cotton Bowl Classic)	CBS	W 19–3	67,500	
*Non-conference game; ^{†}Homecoming; Rankings from AP Poll released prior to the game; All times are in Central time

== Roster ==
Adkins, Ken #5 (So.) SE; Alward, Tom #63 (Jr.) G Anderson, Dan #67 (Sr.) G Anderson, Frosty #89 (Sr.) SE; Austin, Al #78 (Sr.) OT; Bahe, Ritch #24 (Jr.) WB; Belka, Jim #47 (Jr.) FB; Bell, John #66 (Sr.) MG; Benish, Randy #4 (So.) DB; Bonness, Rik #54 (So.) C Borg, Randy #19 (Sr.) DB; Brock, Dan #00 (So.) DT; Burns, Burton #49 (So.) FB; Burrow, Jim #2 (So.) DB; Butterfield, Dave #34 (So.) DB; Coccia, Tom #98 (So.) DE; Costanzo, Rich #77 (So.) OT; Coyle, Mike (So.) PK; Crenshaw, Marvin #70 (Jr.) OT; Damkroger, Maury #46 (Sr.) FB; Davis, Tony #25 (So.) IB; Doak, Mark #71 (Jr.) OT; Duda, Rich #50 (Jr.) C Dutton, John #90 (Sr.) DT; Eichelberger, Percy #44 (So.) LB; Everett, Earl #9 (So.) QB; Fischer, Pat #33 (Sr.) DB; Gissler, Dean #97 (So.) DT; Goeller, Dave #28 (Sr.) IB; Hegener, Stan #64 (Jr.) G Heiser, Tom #27 (So.) WB; Henrichs, Dennis #75 (Jr.) OT; Heydorff, Mark #22 (Jr.) DB	Hill, Jeff #36 (Jr.) SE; Hoins, Steve #52 (So.) OT; Humm, Dave #12 (Jr.) QB; Hunter, Ken #78 (Jr.) MG; Iverson, Dave #42 (So.) LB; Johnson, Ardell #29 (Jr.) DB; Johnson, Doug #92 (Sr.) DT; Jones, Chuck #35 (So.) DB; Kyros, George #18 (Jr.) DB; Lackovic, Tim #80 (Jr.) SE; Lee, John #69 (So.) MG; Lemmerond, Rick #8 (So.) QB; Leonardi, Chad #61 (Jr.) G Lessman, Randy #6 (So.) DE; Lingenfelter, Bob #73 (So.) OT; Lloyd, Jerry #99 (So.) MG; Longwell, Brent #86 (Sr.) TE; Luck, Terry #11 (So.) QB; Manstedt, Steve #82 (Sr.) DE; Martin, Bob #87 (So.) DB; Mazon, Frank #31 (So.) DB; Mills, George (So.) DT; Monds, Wonder #26 (So.) DB; Moran, Jeff #30 (Jr.) IB; Mushinskie, Larry #88 (So.) TE; Nelson, Bob #57 (Jr.) LB; Nelson, Chris #37 (Jr.) TE; Norrie, Rod #94 (Jr.) DT; Offner, Mike #95 (So.) DE; O'Holleran, Mike #38 (Sr.) FB; O'Leary, John #14 (So.) IB; Panneton, Rick #81 (Jr.) TE; Pate, Tom #68 (Jr.) DE; Pavelka, Dennis #74 (Jr.) OT	Peterson, Matt #39 (So.) TE; Pillen, Clete #7 (So.) LB; Powell, Ralph #41 (Sr.) FB; Pruitt, Ron #91 (So.) DT; Pumphrey, Jeff #3 (So.) SE; Ray, Glen #10 (So.) QB; Redding, Dave #96 (So.) DE; Revelle, Bob #84 (Jr.) SE; Rogers, Terry #40 (Jr.) DB; Runty, Steve #13 (Sr.) QB; Rutan, Bob #55 (So.) DE; Ruud, Tom #45 (Jr.) LB; Sanger, Rich #43 (Sr.) P/PK; Schmidt, Dan #51 (So.) G Schmit, Bob #23 (Sr.) LB; Schneider, Jeff #1 (So.) DB; Seeton, Jim #16 (So.) DB; Shamblin, Dave #85 (So.) SE; Sledge, Jim #58 (So.) OT; Starkebaum, John #48 (Jr.) DB; Stuberg, Wayne #59 (So.) C Talley, Chester #32 (So.) IB; Thomas, Tom #53 (Jr.) C Thornton, Bob #17 (Sr.) DB; Thornton, Willie #65 (So.) MG; Varner, Rich #56 (So.) C Westbrook, Don #21 (Jr.) WB; White, Daryl #72 (Sr.) OT; Wied, Jerry #93 (So.) DT; Wieser, Steve #83 (Jr.) DE; Wolfe, Bob #76 (Sr.) OG; Yaralian, Zaven #15 (Sr.) DB; Zanetich, Nick #62 (So.) G

Defense

FS
Bob Thornton
George Kyros
Jim Seeton

INSDIE	INSDIE
Tom Ruud	Bob Nelson
Bob Schmit	John Starkebaum
Precy Eichelberger	Bob Schmit

MONSTER BACK
Mike Heydorff
Wonder Monds
Terry Rogers

CB
Zaven Yaralian
Chuck Jones
Dave Butterfield

DE	DT	NT	DT	DE
Bob Martin	Ron Pruitt	John Bell	John Dutton	Steve Manstedt
Tom Pate	Dean Gissler	John Lee	Willie Thornton	Steve Wieser
Dave Redding	Doug Johnson	Willie Thornton	George Mills	Mike Offner

CB
Randy Borg
Ardell Johnson
Pat Fischer

Offense

SE
Frosty Anderson
Dave Shamblin
Jeff Hill

LT	LG	C	RG	RT
Daryl White	Tom Alward	Rik Bonness	Dan Anderson	Marvin Crenshaw
Mark Doak	Bob Wolfe	Rich Duda	Stan Hegener	Al Larson
Rich Costanzo	Chad Leonardi	Tom Thomas	Nick Zanetich	Dennis Pavelka

TE
Brent Longwell
Larry Mushinskie
Rick Panneton

WB
Ritch Bahe
Don Westbook
Tom Heiser

QB
Dave Humm
Steve Runty
Earl Everett

Key reserves

FB
Maury Damkroger
Ralph Powell
Mike O’Holleran

Special teams

RB
Tony Davis
John O'Leary
Dave Goeller

== Coaching staff ==
Name	Title	First year in this position	Years at Nebraska	Alma mater
Tom Osborne	Head Coach; Offensive coordinator	1973	1964–97	Hastings
Monte Kiffin	Defensive coordinator	1973	1967–76	Nebraska
Cletus Fischer	Offensive line		1960–85	Nebraska
Jim Ross			1962–76	
John Melton	Tight ends, wingbacks	1973	1962–88	Wyoming
Mike Corgan	Running backs	1962	1962–82	Notre Dame
Warren Powers	Defensive backs	1969	1969–76	Nebraska
Boyd Epley	Head strength coach	1969	1969–2003	Nebraska
Bill Myles	Offensive line	1972	1972–76	Drake University
Jerry Moore	Wide receivers	1973	1973–78	Baylor
George Darlington		1973	1973–2002	Rutgers
Rick Duval	Linebackers; Recruiting coordinator	1973	1973–74	Worcester

== Game summaries ==
=== UCLA ===
#10 UCLA at #4 Nebraska [box score]

Team	1	2	3	4	Total
#10 UCLA	6	7	0	0	13
• #4 Nebraska	14	6	6	14	40

- Date: 1973-09-08
- Location: Memorial Stadium, Lincoln, Nebraska
- Game attendance: 74,966

The Tom Osborne era at Nebraska began in style, as the Cornhuskers exacted revenge for last year's loss to UCLA by beating the #10 Bruins in Lincoln 40–13. Nebraska jumped out to a 14–0 lead in less than 10 minutes, and though UCLA scored to come within 7, that was as close as they'd get for the rest of the game as the Blackshirts shut out the Bruins entirely in the 2nd half.

=== NC State ===
#14 NC State at #2 Nebraska [box score]

Team	1	2	3	4	Total
#14 NC State	7	0	7	0	14
• #2 Nebraska	0	7	3	21	31

- Date: 1973-09-22
- Location: Memorial Stadium, Lincoln, Nebraska
- Game attendance: 75,925

It was touch and go for Nebraska as the Cornhuskers fought to stay even with NC State until blowing the game wide open in the 4th quarter with three straight unanswered touchdowns.

=== Wisconsin ===
Wisconsin at #2 Nebraska [box score]

Team	1	2	3	4	Total
Wisconsin	0	7	0	9	16
• #2 Nebraska	7	0	0	13	20

- Date: 1973-09-29
- Location: Memorial Stadium, Lincoln, Nebraska
- Game attendance: 76,279

Wisconsin fought Nebraska to a 7–7 tie entering the 4th quarter before pulling ahead by 3 on a field goal with 8 minutes to go. The Cornhuskers replied with a touchdown, which was promptly answered by a 96-yard Badger kickoff return to put Nebraska behind again. Nebraska again responded, marching 83 yards in just seven plays to score again for the win.

=== Minnesota ===
#2 Nebraska at Minnesota [box score]

Team	1	2	3	4	Total
• #2 Nebraska	7	14	13	14	48
Minnesota	7	0	0	0	7

- Date: 1973-10-06
- Location: Memorial Stadium, Minneapolis
- Game attendance: 58,091

Minnesota QB Tony Dungy managed to get a 1st-quarter touchdown, and that would be the last time the Golden Gophers saw the scoreboard, as the first Minnesota sellout since 1960 (with help from the numerous traveling Cornhusker fans) watched Nebraska dismantle the Gophers 48–7.

=== Missouri ===
#2 Nebraska at Missouri [box score]

Team	1	2	3	4	Total
#2 Nebraska	6	0	0	6	12
• Missouri	0	6	0	7	13

- Date: 1973-10-13
- Location: Faurot Field, Columbia, Missouri
- Game attendance: 68,720

Missouri handed coach Tom Osborne his first career defeat as Nebraska's 2-point conversion for the win with 1:00 remaining was intercepted, marking the first time Coach Osborne decided to forgo the tie and take a shot at the win, an approach later repeated to much attention in the 1984 Orange Bowl.

=== Kansas ===
#18 Kansas at #11 Nebraska [box score]

Team	1	2	3	4	Total
#18 Kansas	0	3	6	0	9
• #11 Nebraska	7	0	0	3	10

- Date: 1973-10-20
- Location: Memorial Stadium, Lincoln, Nebraska
- Game attendance: 76,498

Scoring summary
1	NEB	Davis 2-yard run (Sanger kick)	Nebraska 7–0
2	KAN	Swift 26-yard field goal	Nebraska 7–3
2	KAN	Williams 4-yard run (kick failed)	Kansas 9–7
4	NEB	Sanger 28-yard field goal	Nebraska 10–9

Kansas avoided the 1st half shutout on a recovered Nebraska fumble converted into a field goal. The Jayhawks then came out from halftime and continued to hold off Nebraska while putting in their own touchdown late in the 3rd to pull ahead, though the PAT was blocked. Less than five minutes later, Nebraska responded with a field goal to pull ahead by 1 point, where a tie would have existed had the previous Kansas PAT attempt been good. From there on out, the Blackshirts held on for the rest of the quarter to preserve the razor thin winning margin.

=== Oklahoma State ===
#10 Nebraska at Oklahoma State [box score]

Team	1	2	3	4	Total
#10 Nebraska	10	0	7	0	17
Oklahoma State	10	7	0	0	17

- Date: 1973-10-27
- Location: Lewis Field, Stillwater, Oklahoma
- Game attendance: 50,500

With 2:23 remaining in a fierce contest, no scoring since the previous quarter, and a 17–17 tie still on the board, Nebraska opted to forgo the easy field goal and instead attempted to go for it on 4th and goal inside the Cowboys' one yard line, but the attempt failed, and both teams were forced to settle for a tie.

=== Colorado ===
#17 Colorado at #13 Nebraska [box score]

Team	1	2	3	4	Total
#17 Colorado	0	3	6	7	16
• #13 Nebraska	14	14	0	0	28

- Date: 1973-11-03
- Location: Memorial Stadium, Lincoln, Nebraska
- Game attendance: 76,555

Scoring summary
1	12:38	NEB	Brent Longwell 9-yard pass from David Humm (Sanger kick)	NEB 7–0
1	6:39	NEB	Tony Davis 9-yard run (Sanger kick)	NEB 14–0
2	13:13	COL	Fred Lima 31-yard field goal	NEB 14–3
2	8:35	NEB	Frosty Anderson 21-yard pass from David Humm (Sanger kick)	NEB 21–3
2	0:52	NEB	Tony Davis 1-yard run (Sanger kick)	NEB 28–3
3	11:10	COL	Bo Matthews 5-yard run (kick failed)	NEB 28–9
4	11:35	COL	David Williams 73-yard pass from Billy Waddy (Lima kick)	NEB 28–16

Colorado never really had a chance in this game, as Nebraska rolled out to an early 28–3 lead by the half. The final Cornhusker touchdown was a change of plans, after a field goal setup was moved towards the end zone due to a Colorado penalty, and Nebraska instead decided to run one in. The 4th quarter Buffalo touchdown was made on a trick play against Nebraska reserves who had entered the game to mop up.

=== Iowa State ===
Iowa State at #11 Nebraska [box score]

Team	1	2	3	4	Total
Iowa State	0	0	7	0	7
• #11 Nebraska	14	10	0	7	31

- Date: 1973-11-10
- Location: Memorial Stadium, Lincoln, Nebraska
- Game attendance: 76,503

Once again, Nebraska ran out to a substantial early lead and coasted in for the win, as the game was essentially decided when the Cornhuskers put in a 67-yard pass touchdown just before the half. Nebraska reserves entered the game in the 4th and put in a touchdown to further pad the win.

=== Kansas State ===
#10 Nebraska at Kansas State [box score]

Team	1	2	3	4	Total
• #10 Nebraska	10	13	7	20	50
Kansas State	0	0	14	7	21

- Date: 1973-11-17
- Location: KSU Stadium, Manhattan, Kansas
- Game attendance: 42,000

Kansas State never was in this game, as the Cornhuskers blasted the Wildcats for a 23–0 1st half lead and never really slowed down, rolling up 612 yards of total offense along the way. The performances of Nebraska IB Tony Davis and IB John O'Leary on the day marked the first time two Cornhusker runners exceeded 100 yards in the same game.

=== Oklahoma ===
#10 Nebraska at #3 Oklahoma [box score]

Team	1	2	3	4	Total
#10 Nebraska	0	0	0	0	0
• #3 Oklahoma	14	0	6	7	27

- Date: 1973-11-23
- Location: Oklahoma Memorial Stadium, Norman, Oklahoma
- Game attendance: 61,826

Oklahoma completely dismantled Nebraska in every way, as the Cornhuskers were shut out for the first time since 1968, an indignity that would not be repeated until Miami defeated Nebraska in the 1992 Orange Bowl eighteen years later. The Cornhuskers were held to just 74 ground yards and 174 yards of total offense as the Nebraska offense never crossed mid-field.

=== Texas ===
#8 Texas vs #12 Nebraska [box score]

Team	1	2	3	4	Total
#8 Texas	3	0	0	0	3
• #12 Nebraska	0	3	13	3	19

- Date: 1974-01-01
- Location: Cotton Bowl,
  Dallas, Texas
- Game start: 1:00 CST
- Game attendance: 67,500

SWC champion Texas put up the first points early in the 1st quarter with a field goal, but never saw the scoreboard again as Nebraska fought back to a 3–3 tie by the half, and then shut down the Longhorns' efforts afterwards by blocking a field goal and recovering a Texas fumble along the way to creating a comfortable lead by the end of the 3rd quarter. It was the Huskers fifth consecutive bowl victory.

== Rankings ==
Ranking movements Legend: ██ Increase in ranking ██ Decrease in ranking
	Week														
Poll	Pre	1	2	3	4	5	6	7	8	9	10	11	12	13	Final
AP	4	2	2	2	2	2	11	10	13	11	10	10	13	12	7
Coaches															11

== Awards ==
Award	Name(s)
All-America; 1st team	John Dutton, Daryl White
All-America honorable mention	Steve Manstedt
All-Big Eight; 1st team	Frosty Anderson, John Dutton, Steve Manstedt, Daryl White
All-Big Eight; 2nd team	Dan Anderson, John Bell, Randy Borg
All-Big Eight honorable mention	Ritch Bahe, Tony Davis, Dave Humm, Bob Thornton

== 1973 team players in the NFL ==
The 1973 Nebraska Cornhuskers seniors selected in the 1974 NFL draft:

Player	Position	Round	Pick	Franchise
John Dutton	DE	1	5	Baltimore Colts
Steve Manstedt	LB	4	79	Houston Oilers
Daryl White	G	4	98	Cincinnati Bengals
Bob Wolfe	T	6	156	Miami Dolphins
Maury Damkroger	LB	7	178	New England Patriots
Frosty Anderson	WR	10	235	New Orleans Saints

The 1973 Nebraska Cornhuskers juniors selected in the following year's 1975 NFL draft:

Player	Position	Round	Pick	Franchise
Tom Ruud	LB	1	19	Buffalo Bills
Bob Nelson	LB	2	42	Buffalo Bills
John Starkebaum	DB	4	92	New Orleans Saints
David Humm	QB	5	128	Oakland Raiders
Don Westbrook	WR	6	131	Baltimore Colts
Mark Doak	T	6	147	Washington Redskins
Ardell Johnson	DB	11	277	Washington Redskins
Ritch Bahe	WR	14	358	St. Louis Cardinals
Dennis Pavelka	G	16	412	Washington Redskins
Stan Hegener	G	17	442	Pittsburgh Steelers

The 1973 Nebraska Cornhuskers sophomores selected in the 1976 NFL draft:

Player	Position	Round	Pick	Franchise
Rik Bonness	C	3	84	Oakland Raiders
Tony Davis	RB	4	106	Cincinnati Bengals
Wonder Monds	DB	4	112	Pittsburgh Steelers
Bob Martin	LB	6	163	New York Jets
Jim Burrow	DB	8	218	Green Bay Packers
Dean Gissler	DE	11	308	Washington Redskins
John O'Leary	RB	12	303	Chicago Bears
Brad Jenkins	TE	13	348	Tampa Bay Buccaneers
John Lee	DT	13	351	San Diego Chargers
Larry Mushinskie	TE	14	402	Dallas Cowboys
Rick Costanzo	T	16	458	Dallas Cowboys

=== NFL and pro players ===
The following is a list of 1973 Nebraska players
who joined a professional team as draftees or free agents.

Name	Team
Tom Alward	Birmingham Vulcans
Rik Bonness	Oakland Raiders
Jim Burrow	Green Bay Packers
Tony Davis	Cincinnati Bengals
Mark Doak	Birmingham Vulcans
Maury Damkroger	New England Patriots
John Dutton	Baltimore Colts
Dave Humm	Oakland Raiders
John Lee	San Diego Chargers
Bob Lingenfelter	Cleveland Browns
Brent Longwell	Memphis Southmen
Terry Luck	Cleveland Browns
Steve Manstedt	Birmingham Americans
Bob Martin	New York Jets
Wonder Monds	Ottawa Rough Riders
Bob Nelson	Buffalo Bills
John O'Leary	Montreal Alouettes
Tom Pate	Hamilton Tiger-Cats
Tom Ruud	Buffalo Bills
Bob Schmit	Portland Storm
Don Westbrook	New England Patriots
Daryl White	Detroit Lions
Bob Wolfe	Birmingham Americans
Zaven Yaralian	Philadelphia Bell
