= John Dutton (defensive lineman) =

American football player (born 1951)

- Dutton in 1977

No. 78
- Position: Defensive lineman

Personal information
- Born: February 6, 1951 (age 75); Rapid City, South Dakota, U.S.
- Listed height: 6 ft 6 in (1.98 m)
- Listed weight: 266 lb (121 kg)

Career information
- High school: Central (Rapid City)
- College: Nebraska
- NFL draft: 1974: 1st round, 5th overall pick

Career history
- Baltimore Colts (1974–1978); Dallas Cowboys (1979–1987)

Awards and highlights
- First-team All-Pro (1976); Second-team All-Pro (1975); 3× Pro Bowl (1975–1977); NFL sacks leader (1975); PFWA All-Rookie Team (1974); National champion (1971); Unanimous All-American (1973); First-team All-Big Eight (1973)

Career NFL statistics
- Games played: 185
- Starts: 160
- Sacks: 73
- Interceptions: 1
- Stats at Pro Football Reference

John Owen Dutton (born February 6, 1951) is an American former professional football player who was a defensive lineman in the National Football League (NFL) for the Baltimore Colts and Dallas Cowboys. He played college football for the Nebraska Cornhuskers.

== Early life ==
Born and raised in Rapid City, South Dakota, Dutton attended Cathedral High School, where the football team was undefeated in his junior year. After the school closed in the fall of 1968, he transferred to Central High School and led the Cobblers to the state Class A basketball title in his senior year (1969).

Dutton was a two-time All-state selection in basketball and football. He received high school All-American recognition in both sports as a senior and was also an accomplished Discus thrower.

In 1993, he was inducted into the South Dakota Sports Hall of Fame.

== College career ==
Although he received more scholarship offers for basketball, Dutton opted to accept a football scholarship from the University of Nebraska to play under head coach Bob Devaney.

In 1971 as an alternate starter, he was part of the undefeated national championship team. Sophomore Dutton participated in the Oklahoma game on Thanksgiving, also called the "Game of the Century", generally considered one of the greatest college football games ever played.

As a junior in 1972, he was named the starter at defensive end, registering 67 tackles (second on the team).

In 1973 under new head coach Tom Osborne, Dutton earned consensus All-American and All-Big 8 honors. He posted 71 tackles (fourth on the team) and 8 sacks. In the Cotton Bowl in Dallas against favored Texas, Dutton and the Blackshirts held the Longhorns to one field goal and 196 total yards for the Huskers' fifth bowl victory in as many seasons.

Dutton also threw the discus for the Husker track team. In 1981, he was inducted into the University of Nebraska Athletics Hall of Fame.

== Professional career ==
=== Baltimore Colts ===
Dutton was the fifth overall selection in the first round of the 1974 NFL draft, taken by the Baltimore Colts. The 6-foot-7, 266-pound defensive end was ahead of his time and became an immediate starter at right defensive end, receiving NFL all-rookie honors at the end of the season. He had 79 tackles, 5 unofficial sacks and one pass defensed.

In the three consecutive seasons in which the Colts won the AFC East title from 1975 to 1977, he was a starting member of a defensive front four who collectively called themselves the "Looney Tunes" and was also known as the "Sack Pack." He led the Colts in sacks with a career-high 17, to go along with 73 tackles (second on the team) and one fumble recovery in 1975. He had 3 sacks against the Kansas City Chiefs. He was named to the first of three straight Pro Bowls, becoming one of the most dominant defensive lineman in the NFL.

In 1976, he led the team with 13 unofficial sacks and had 73 tackles.

In 1977, he appeared in 12 out of 14 games. He had 6 unofficial sacks and 39 tackles. He had 3 sacks against the Buffalo Bills.

In 1978, he led the team with 6 unofficial sacks and 3 fumble recoveries, while also making 115 tackles (third on the team). He started 14 games, before missing the last 2 with a foot injury. He had 10 solo tackles against the Miami Dolphins.

=== Dallas Cowboys ===
Dutton began the 1979 NFL season as a contract holdout. He and the National Football League Players Association (NFLPA) challenged the circuit's option clause by arguing that it was not perpetual. He also demanded from the Colts a $1 million contract of which he would be paid $200,000 annually for five years. He expressed a desire to leave the team primarily because of owner Robert Irsay, accusing him of spreading "too many lies" about him in Baltimore and further stating, "I don't think he cares about the team, it's just a toy to him." He was traded from the Colts to the Dallas Cowboys on October 9, 1979. Because of the retirement of Jethro Pugh and the desire of Ed "Too Tall" Jones to become a professional boxer, the Cowboys traded the first (#24-Derrick Hatchett) and second round pick (#51-Tim J. Foley) in the 1980 NFL draft. He appeared in 8 games, starting in the final 4 contests including the playoffs. He registered 25 tackles and one unofficial sack.

When Jones returned in 1980, Dutton moved to left defensive tackle, playing behind Larry Cole. He tallied 52 tackles, 3.5 unofficial sacks, 2 fumble recoveries and one interception returned for a touchdown.

In 1981, with the retirement of Cole, he started 16 games alongside Randy White, establishing a formidable defensive line that also included Jones and Harvey Martin. He recorded 81 tackles (sixth on the team), 4.5 unofficial sacks and 5 passes batted-down. He couldn't play in the NFC Championship Game against the San Francisco 49ers because of a bruised thigh and Larry Bethea started in his place.

In 1982, he appeared in only 9 contests because of injuries and the player's strike, making 38 tackles and 2 sacks. In 1983, he had 71 tackles and 4.5 sacks. In 1984, he tallied 73 tackles and 2.5 sacks.

He was part of the 1985 defensive unit that holds the Cowboys' single-season sack record (62). He came out in obvious passing downs, finishing with 74 tackles and 4 sacks.

In 1986, he had 59 tackles and 5 sacks. In 1987, he was passed on the depth chart by Kevin Brooks and was released three games after the end of the player's strike on November 13. He spent 14 seasons and 185 games in the NFL and recorded only 18 official sacks, because the NFL didn't recognize quarterback sacks as an official statistic until 1982.

During his 9 years in Dallas, he helped the Cowboys reach the NFC title game three straight years (1980, 1981 and 1982). He may have been the best Cowboys defensive lineman to have never won a Super Bowl ring.

== Personal life ==
After his career in the NFL, former Husker Dutton retired to Lincoln, Nebraska. He became involved in businesses and for a short time owned and operated Dutton's Den, an off-sale liquor store and restaurant. He also founded a signs company. Dutton now lives in Dallas, Texas.
