= 1973 Kansas Jayhawks football team =

American college football season

1973 Kansas Jayhawks football

Liberty Bowl, L 18–31 vs. NC State
- Conference: Big Eight Conference

Ranking
- Coaches: No. 15
- AP: No. 18
- Record: 7–4–1 (4–2–1 Big 8)
- Head coach: Don Fambrough (3rd season)
- Defensive coordinator: Jim Dickey (1st season)
- Captains: Don Goode; John Bryant
- Home stadium: Memorial Stadium

1973 Big Eight Conference football standings
	Conf.					Overall
Team	W		L		T	W		L		T
No. 3 Oklahoma $	7	–	0	–	0	10	–	0	–	1
No. 7 Nebraska	4	–	2	–	1	9	–	2	–	1
No. 18 Kansas	4	–	2	–	1	7	–	4	–	1
No. 17 Missouri	3	–	4	–	0	8	–	4	–	0
Oklahoma State	2	–	3	–	2	5	–	4	–	2
Colorado	2	–	5	–	0	5	–	6	–	0
Kansas State	2	–	5	–	0	5	–	6	–	0
Iowa State	2	–	5	–	0	4	–	7	–	0
$ – Conference champion; Rankings from AP Poll

The 1973 Kansas Jayhawks football team represented the University of Kansas in the Big Eight Conference during the 1973 NCAA Division I football season. In their third season under head coach Don Fambrough, the Jayhawks compiled a 7–4–1 record (4–2–1 against conference opponents), tied for second place in the conference, lost to NC State in the 1973 Liberty Bowl, and outscored all opponents by a combined total of 253 to 220. They played their home games at Memorial Stadium in Lawrence, Kansas.

The team's statistical leaders included David Jaynes with 2,349 passing yards, Delvin Williams with 788 rushing yards and Emmett Edwards with 840 receiving yards. Jaynes set six conference passing records and was named the Big Eight Offensive Player of the Year. Don Goode and John Bryant were the team captains. Quarterback David Jaynes, became the first and as of the 2022 voting, the only Jayhawk to be a Heisman Trophy finalist, finishing in 4th place in the voting receiving 65 first place votes.

== Schedule ==
Date	Opponent	Rank	Site	TV	Result	Attendance	Source
September 15	Washington State*		Memorial Stadium; Lawrence, KS		W 29–8	39,750	
September 22	at Florida State*		Doak Campbell Stadium; Tallahassee, FL		W 28–0	19,240	
September 29	Minnesota*		Memorial Stadium; Lawrence, KS		W 34–19	44,500	
October 6	at No. 9 Tennessee*		Liberty Bowl Memorial Stadium; Memphis, TN		L 27–28	43,716	
October 13	Kansas State^{†}	No. 19	Memorial Stadium; Lawrence, KS (rivalry)		W 25–18	52,000	
October 20	at No. 11 Nebraska	No. 18	Memorial Stadium; Lincoln, NE (rivalry)		L 9–10	76,498	
October 27	at Iowa State	No. 17	Clyde Williams Field; Ames, IA		W 22–20	35,000	
November 3	Oklahoma State		Memorial Stadium; Lawrence, KS		T 10–10	40,000	
November 10	Colorado	No. 18	Memorial Stadium; Lawrence, KS	ABC	W 17–15	34,000	
November 17	at No. 3 Oklahoma	No. 18	Oklahoma Memorial Stadium; Norman, OK		L 20–48	61,826	
November 24	No. 19 Missouri	No. 20	Memorial Stadium; Lawrence, KS (Border War)		W 14–13	46,500	
December 17	vs. No. 16 NC State*	No. 19	Liberty Bowl Memorial Stadium; Memphis, TN (Liberty Bowl)	ABC	L 18–31	50,011	
*Non-conference game; ^{†}Homecoming; Rankings from AP Poll released prior to the game

== Roster ==
1973 Kansas Jayhawks football team roster
Players
Coaches
Offense

Pos.	#	Name	Class
WR	25	Bruce Adams	Jr
OT	74	John Bryant	Sr
FB	33	Steve Elliott	So
G	66	Mike Englebrake	Jr
TE	84	Jerry Gilmore	So
QB	12	David Jaynes	Sr
QB	10	Scott McMichael	So
QB	11	Jud Mitchell	So
G	71	Leonard Schmitz	So
RB	40	Delvin Williams	Sr
FB	32	Robert Miller	Jr
RB	17	Randy Ross	Jr
WR	83	Ken Saathoff	Jr
WR	47	Emmett Edwards	Jr
WR	22	Paul Bower	So
TE	88	Gregg Hosack	So
C	54	Mike McDaniel	Sr
G	65	John Morgan	So
OT	76	Dave Scott	So
OT	70	Gordon Stockemer	Jr
G	72	Jerone Hodges	Sr

Defense

Pos.	#	Name	Class
CB	26	James Browman	Sr
DB	9	Nolan Cromwell	Fr
FS	30	Jim David	So
S		Chris Golub	Fr
DE	68	Don Goode	Jr
CB	18	Kurt Knoff	So
LB	53	Randy Robinson	Jr
DT	79	Bill Skepnek	Sr
CB	34	Steve Taylor	So
DE	87	Dean Zook	Jr
DT	45	Mike Lemon	Jr
DT	77	Mitch Sutton	Sr
LB	51	Dean Baird	Jr
LB	50	Steve Towle	Jr
LB	37	Mike Gardner	Sr
S	19	Rocky Bron	Sr

Special teams

Pos.	#	Name	Class
P	43	Marc Harris	Sr
K	31	Bob Swift	So

Head coach

- Don Fambrough

Coordinators/assistant coaches

Legend

- (C) Team captain
- (S) Suspended
- (I) Ineligible
- Injured
- Redshirt

== Team players in the NFL ==
Player	Position	Round	Pick	NFL club
Don Goode	Linebacker	1	15	San Diego Chargers
Delvin Williams	Running Back	2	49	San Francisco 49ers
Mitch Sutton	Defensive Tackle	3	63	Philadelphia Eagles
David Jaynes	Quarterback	3	66	Kansas City Chiefs
