= R. W. Hicks =

American football player (born 1951)

No. 60
- Position: Center

Personal information
- Born: January 4, 1951 (age 75); Cleveland, Ohio, U.S.
- Listed height: 6 ft 4 in (1.93 m)
- Listed weight: 250 lb (113 kg)

Career information
- High school: Washington
- College: Humboldt State
- NFL draft: 1974: undrafted

Career history
- Denver Broncos (1974)*; Cincinnati Bengals (1975)*; Detroit Lions (1975); Hamilton Tiger-Cats (1976)
- * Offseason or practice squad member only
- Stats at Pro Football Reference

Richard Winslow Hicks (born January 4, 1951) is an American former professional football player who was a Center for the Detroit Lions of National Football League (NFL). He played college football for the Humboldt State University.
