= Lars Ditlev =

Danish-American football player

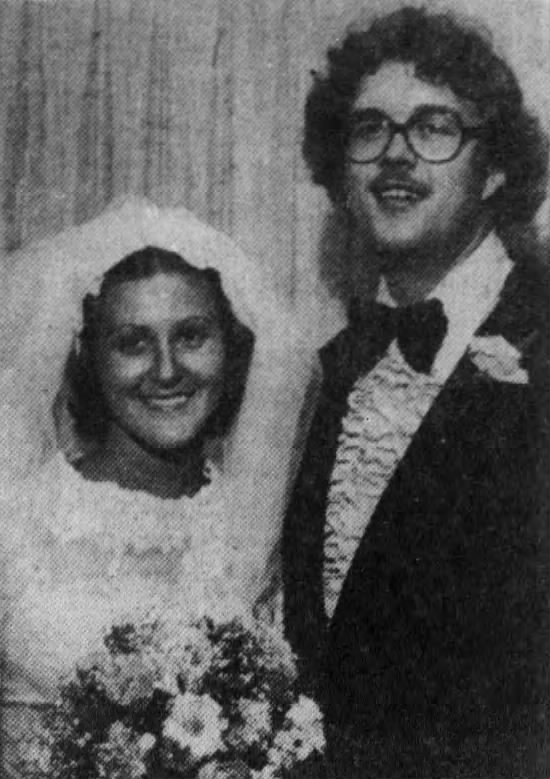
- Ditlev (right) with his wife, 1976

Profile
- Position: Defensive end

Personal information
- Born: December 6, 1951; Randers, Denmark
- Died: January 24, 2021 (aged 69)
- Listed height: 6 ft 8 in (2.03 m)

Career information
- College: South Dakota Mines
- NFL draft: 1974: 13th round, 323rd overall pick

Lars Ditlev (December 6, 1951 – January 24, 2021) was a Danish-American football player.

== Life and career ==
Ditlev was born in Randers, the son of Peter Ditlev. He graduated from Lincoln High School in Sioux Falls, South Dakota.

Ditlev played for the South Dakota Mines Hardrockers football team during the 1970s.

Ditlev was selected 323rd overall in the 13th round of the 1974 NFL draft by the Philadelphia Eagles as a defensive end; he did not make the final roster.

Ditlev died on January 24, 2021, at the age of 69. He had 2 sons, Keld and Hans. Keld played football and Hans played basketball for South Dakota Mines Hardrockers.
