= 1973 Oklahoma State Cowboys football team =

American college football season

1973 Oklahoma State Cowboys football
- Conference: Big Eight Conference
- Record: 5–4–2 (2–3–2 Big 8)
- Head coach: Jim Stanley (1st season)
- Home stadium: Lewis Field

1973 Big Eight Conference football standings
| | Conf. | | | | | Overall |
| Team | W | | L | | T | W | | L | | T |
|---|---|---|---|---|---|---|---|---|---|---|
| No. 3 Oklahoma $ | 7 | – | 0 | – | 0 | 10 | – | 0 | – | 1 |
| No. 7 Nebraska | 4 | – | 2 | – | 1 | 9 | – | 2 | – | 1 |
| No. 18 Kansas | 4 | – | 2 | – | 1 | 7 | – | 4 | – | 1 |
| No. 17 Missouri | 3 | – | 4 | – | 0 | 8 | – | 4 | – | 0 |
| Oklahoma State | 2 | – | 3 | – | 2 | 5 | – | 4 | – | 2 |
| Colorado | 2 | – | 5 | – | 0 | 5 | – | 6 | – | 0 |
| Kansas State | 2 | – | 5 | – | 0 | 5 | – | 6 | – | 0 |
| Iowa State | 2 | – | 5 | – | 0 | 4 | – | 7 | – | 0 |
$ – Conference champion; Rankings from AP Poll

The 1973 Oklahoma State Cowboys football team represented Oklahoma State University in the Big Eight Conference during the 1973 NCAA Division I football season. In their first season under head coach Jim Stanley, the Cowboys compiled a 5–4–2 record (2–3–2 against conference opponents), finished in fifth place in the conference, and outscored opponents by a combined total of 303 to 186.

The team's statistical leaders included Brent Blackman with 809 rushing yards and 602 passing yards and Reuben Gant with 447 receiving yards.

The team played its home games at Lewis Field in Stillwater, Oklahoma.

== Schedule ==
| Date | Time | Opponent | Rank | Site | TV | Result | Attendance | Source |
|---|---|---|---|---|---|---|---|---|
| September 15 | | UT Arlington* | | Lewis Field; Stillwater, OK | | W 56–7 | 35,500 | |
| September 22 | | at Arkansas* | No. 17 | War Memorial Stadium; Little Rock, AR | ABC | W 38–6 | 45,683 | |
| September 29 | 1:30 p.m. | Southern Illinois* | No. 12 | Lewis Field; Stillwater, OK | | W 70–7 | 33,000 | |
| October 6 | | Texas Tech* | No. 11 | Lewis Field; Stillwater, OK | | L 7–20 | 41,000 | |
| October 20 | | at No. 7 Missouri | | Faurot Field; Columbia, MO | | L 9–13 | 57,491 | |
| October 27 | | No. 10 Nebraska | | Lewis Field; Stillwater, OK | | T 17–17 | 50,500 | |
| November 3 | | at Kansas | | Memorial Stadium; Lawrence, KS | | T 10–10 | 40,000 | |
| November 10 | | Kansas State^{†} | | Lewis Field; Stillwater, OK | | W 28–9 | 38,000 | |
| November 17 | | at Colorado | | Folsom Field; Boulder, CO | | W 38–24 | 50,169 | |
| November 24 | | at Iowa State | No. 18 | Clyde Williams Field; Ames, IA | | L 12–28 | 25,000 | |
| December 1 | | No. 2 Oklahoma | | Lewis Field; Stillwater, OK (Bedlam Series) | | L 18–45 | 50,511 | |
*Non-conference game; ^{†}Homecoming; Rankings from AP Poll released prior to the game; All times are in Central time

== After the season ==
The 1974 NFL draft was held on January 29–30, 1974. The following Cowboys were selected.

| Round | Pick | Player | Position | NFL club |
|---|---|---|---|---|
| 1 | 18 | Reuben Gant | Tight end | Buffalo Bills |
| 3 | 57 | Glenn Robinson | Defensive end | Baltimore Colts |
| 5 | 130 | Cleveland Vann | Linebacker | Miami Dolphins |
| 8 | 206 | Bon Boatwright | Defensive tackle | San Diego Chargers |
