= 1973 Oklahoma Sooners football team =

American college football season

1973 Oklahoma Sooners football
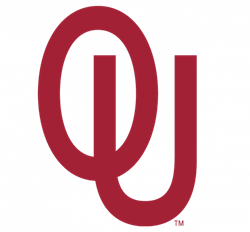

National champion (CFRA, Sagarin) Big 8 champion
- Conference: Big Eight Conference

Ranking
- Coaches: No. 2
- AP: No. 3
- Record: 10–0–1 (7–0 Big 8)
- Head coach: Barry Switzer (1st season)
- Offensive coordinator: Galen Hall (1st season)
- Offensive scheme: Wishbone
- Defensive coordinator: Larry Lacewell (4th season)
- Captains: Gary Baccus; Eddie Foster; Lucious Selmon; Tim Welch
- Home stadium: Oklahoma Memorial Stadium

1973 Big Eight Conference football standings
	Conf.					Overall
Team	W		L		T	W		L		T
No. 3 Oklahoma $	7	–	0	–	0	10	–	0	–	1
No. 7 Nebraska	4	–	2	–	1	9	–	2	–	1
No. 18 Kansas	4	–	2	–	1	7	–	4	–	1
No. 17 Missouri	3	–	4	–	0	8	–	4	–	0
Oklahoma State	2	–	3	–	2	5	–	4	–	2
Colorado	2	–	5	–	0	5	–	6	–	0
Kansas State	2	–	5	–	0	5	–	6	–	0
Iowa State	2	–	5	–	0	4	–	7	–	0
$ – Conference champion; Rankings from AP Poll

The 1973 Oklahoma Sooners football team represented the University of Oklahoma in the 1973 NCAA Division I football season. Oklahoma participated as members of the Big Eight Conference and played its home games in Gaylord Family Oklahoma Memorial Stadium where it has played its home games since 1923. The team posted a 10–0–1 overall record and a 7–0 conference record to earn the Conference outright title under first-year head coach Barry Switzer. This would be the first of eight consecutive Big Eight Conference championships for the Sooners with Switzer as head coach.

The team was led by three All-Americans: Rod Shoate (Oklahoma's second three-time All-American), Lucious Selmon, and Eddie Foster. Lucious and his brothers Lee Roy and Dewey started on the defensive line. The team went undefeated on a schedule that included seven ranked opponents (In order, #1 USC, #17 Miami, #13 Texas, #13 Colorado, #10 Missouri, #18 Kansas, and #10 Nebraska). Five of these opponents finished the season ranked. The team tied with USC in the second game of the season before winning nine consecutive contests. It began the season ranked number 11 and steadily climbed in the polls as the season progressed.

Joe Washington led the team in rushing with 1173 yards, Steve Davis led the team in passing yard for with 934 yards, Tinker Owens led the team in receiving with 472 yards, Davis led the team in scoring with 108 points, Shoate led the team in tackles with 126, and Randy Hughes led the team in interceptions with 5.

Prior to the season in August, the Sooners were put on probation by the Big Eight Conference, which included a two-year ban on bowl appearances, and a two-year ban on television appearances (1974, 1975).

== Schedule ==
Date	Time	Opponent	Rank	Site	TV	Result	Attendance	Source
September 15		at Baylor*	No. 11	Baylor Stadium; Waco, TX		W 42–14	46,000	
September 29		at No. 1 USC*	No. 8	Los Angeles Memorial Coliseum; Los Angeles, CA		T 7–7	84,016	
October 6	1:30 p.m.	No. 17 Miami (FL)*	No. 6	Oklahoma Memorial Stadium; Norman, OK		W 24–20	61,826	
October 13		vs. No. 13 Texas*	No. 6	Cotton Bowl; Dallas, TX (Red River Shootout)	ABC	W 52–13	72,204	
October 20		No. 16 Colorado^{†}	No. 3	Oklahoma Memorial Stadium; Norman, OK		W 34–7	61,826	
October 27		at Kansas State	No. 3	KSU Stadium; Manhattan, KS		W 56–14	34,500	
November 3		Iowa State	No. 3	Oklahoma Memorial Stadium; Norman, OK		W 34–17	61,826	
November 10		at No. 10 Missouri	No. 3	Memorial Stadium; Columbia, MO (rivalry)		W 31–3	68,831	
November 17		No. 18 Kansas	No. 3	Oklahoma Memorial Stadium; Norman, OK		W 48–20	61,826	
November 23		No. 10 Nebraska	No. 3	Oklahoma Memorial Stadium; Norman, OK (rivalry)	ABC	W 27–0	61,826	
December 1		at Oklahoma State	No. 2	Lewis Field; Stillwater, OK (Bedlam Series)		W 45–18	50,511	
*Non-conference game; ^{†}Homecoming; Rankings from AP Poll released prior to the game; All times are in Central time

== Rankings ==
Ranking movements Legend: ██ Increase in ranking ██ Decrease in ranking т = Tied with team above or below ( ) = First-place votes
	Week														
Poll	Pre	1	2	3	4	5	6	7	8	9	10	11	12	13	Final
AP	11 т	11	9	8 (1)	6 (1.5)	6	3 (8)	3 (8)	3 (9)	3 (7)	3 (10)	3 (9)	2 (20)	2 (16)	3 (16)

== Awards and honors ==
- All-American: Rod Shoate, Eddie Foster and Lucious Selmon
- Big Eight Athlete of the Year: Selmon
- Big Eight Defensive Player: Selmon
- Chevrolet Defensive Player of the Year: Selmon

== Game summaries ==
=== At Baylor ===
#11 Oklahoma Sooners at Baylor Bears

Team	1	2	3	4	Total
• #11 Oklahoma	21	14	0	7	42
Baylor	0	0	6	8	14

- Date: September 15
- Location: Floyd Casey Stadium, Waco, Texas
- Game attendance: 46,000

Scoring summary
1	Oklahoma	Davis 3-yard run (Fulcher kick)	Oklahoma 7-0
1	Oklahoma	Foster recovered fumble in end zone (Fulcher kick)	Oklahoma 14-0
1	Oklahoma	Washington 7-yard run (Fulcher kick)	Oklahoma 21-0
2	Oklahoma	Washington 13-yard run (Fulcher kick)	Oklahoma 28-0
2	Oklahoma	Clark 50-yard run (Fulcher kick)	Oklahoma 35-0
3	Baylor	Dancer 6-yard pass from Jeffries (run failed)	Oklahoma 35-6
4	Oklahoma	Davis 27-yard run (Fulcher kick)	Oklahoma 42-6
4	Baylor	Kent 28-yard pass from Armstrong (Kent run)	Oklahoma 42-14

=== Miami (FL) ===
Team	1	2	3	4	Total
Miami (FL)	7	13	0	0	20
• Oklahoma	7	0	14	3	24

- Date: October 6
- Location: Oklahoma Memorial Stadium • Norman, Oklahoma
- Game attendance: 61,826

Scoring summary
1	OKLA	Davis 6 Yard Run (Fulcher Kick)	Oklahoma 7–0
1	MIA	Thompson 5 Yard Run (Huffman Kick)	Tie 7-7
2	MIA	Mitchell 79 Yard Pitchout Interception (Huffman kick)	Miami (FL) 14-7
2	MIA	Thompson 4 Yard Run (kick failed)	Miami (FL) 20-7
3	OKLA	Davis 13 Yard Run (Fulcher Kick)	Miami (FL) 20-14
3	OKLA	Owens 52 Yard Pass from Davis (Fulcher Kick)	Oklahoma 21-20
4	OKLA	Fulcher 30 Yard Field Goal	Oklahoma 24-20

=== vs Texas ===
#6 Oklahoma Sooners (2–0) vs. #13 Texas Longhorns (2–1)

Quarter	1	2	3	4	Total
Oklahoma	7	14	14	17	52
Texas	3	3	0	7	13

at Cotton Bowl, Dallas, Texas

- Date: October 13
- Game time: 12:30 p.m.
- Game weather: 68 °F (20 °C)
- Game attendance: 72,204
- TV: ABC
- Box Score

Worst loss in Darrell Royal's coaching career

Team	Category	Player	Statistics
Oklahoma	Passing	Steve Davis	5/6, 185 Yds, 2 TD
Oklahoma	Rushing	Joe Washington	12 Rush, 117 Yds
Oklahoma	Receiving	Tinker Owens	4 Rec, 163 Yds, 2 TD
Texas	Passing	Marty Akins	5/9, 64 Yds, INT
Texas	Rushing	Roosevelt Leaks	20 Rush, 82 Yds
Texas	Receiving	Pat Kelly	4 Rec, 71 Yds

Scoring summary

Quarter	Time	Drive			Team	Scoring information	Score	
Quarter	Time	Plays	Yards	TOP	Team	Scoring information	OU	UT
1	10:05	6	82	2:37	Oklahoma	Tinker Owens 40-yard touchdown reception from Joe Washington, Rick Fulcher kick good	7	0
1	3:25	14	79	6:40	Texas	36-yard field goal by Billy Schott	7	3
2	11:14	12	90	5:17	Texas	44-yard field goal by Billy Schott	7	6
2	10:46	2	68	0:28	Oklahoma	Tinker Owens 63-yard touchdown reception from Steve Davis, Rick Fulcher kick good	14	6
2	0:29	3	47	0:31	Oklahoma	Billy Brooks 47-yard touchdown reception from Steve Davis, Rick Fulcher kick good	21	6
3	11:26	8	77	3:34	Oklahoma	Steve Davis 15-yard touchdown run, Rick Fulcher kick good	28	6
3	1:09	2	7	0:46	Oklahoma	Steve Davis 2-yard touchdown run, Rick Fulcher kick good	35	6
4	13:35	4	9	1:15	Oklahoma	25-yard field goal by Rick Fulcher	38	6
4	11:59	1	11	0:07	Oklahoma	Scott Hill 11-yard touchdown run, Rick Fulcher kick good	45	6
4	7:05	7	80	2:55	Texas	Mike Presley 31-yard touchdown run, Billy Schott kick good	45	13
4	1:39	11	81	5:26	Oklahoma	Joe McReynolds 11-yard touchdown run, Fulcher kick good	52	13
"TOP" = time of possession. For other American football terms, see Glossary of American football.							52	13

=== Colorado ===
Team	1	2	3	4	Total
Colorado	7	0	0	0	7
• Oklahoma	7	7	7	13	34

- Date: October 20
- Location: Oklahoma Memorial Stadium, Norman, Oklahoma
- Game attendance: 61,826

Scoring summary
1	COL	Matthews 3-yard run (Lima kick)	Colorado 7–0
1	OKLA	Hoffman 37-yard pass from Davis (Fulcher kick)	Tie 7–7
2	OKLA	Hughes 90-yard interception return (Fulcher kick)	Oklahoma 14–7
3	OKLA	Davis 1-yard run (Fulcher kick)	Oklahoma 21–7
4	OKLA	Clark 9-yard run (Fulcher kick)	Oklahoma 28–7
4	OKLA	Russell 12-yard run (kick failed)	Oklahoma 34–7

=== At Kansas State ===
Team	1	2	3	4	Total
• Oklahoma	21	14	14	7	56
Kansas St	0	7	7	0	14

- Date: KSU Stadium
- Location: October 27
- Game attendance: 34,500

Scoring summary
1	OKLA	Welch 1 yard run (Fulcher kick)	Oklahoma 7–0
1	OKLA	Hoffman 13 yard pass from Davis (Fulcher kick)	Oklahoma 14–0
1	OKLA	Davis 22 yard run (Fulcher kick)	Oklahoma 21–0
2	KSU	Holman 4 yard pass from Grogan (Brumley kick)	Oklahoma 21–7
2	OKLA	Davis 27 yard run (Fulcher kick)	Oklahoma 28–7
2	OKLA	Washington 1 yard run (Fulcher kick)	Oklahoma 35–7
3	OKLA	Washington 6 yard run (Fulcher kick)	Oklahoma 42–7
3	OKLA	Brooks 34 yard run (Fulcher kick)	Oklahoma 49–7
3	KSU	Grogan 2 yard run (Brumley kick)	Oklahoma 49–14
4	OKLA	Berg 9 yard run (Fulcher kick)	Oklahoma 56–14

=== Iowa State ===
Team	1	2	3	4	Total
Iowa St	14	3	0	0	17
• Oklahoma	7	13	7	7	34

- Date: November 3
- Location: Oklahoma Memorial Stadium, Norman, Oklahoma
- Game attendance: 61,826

Scoring summary
Q1	OKLA	Washington 30 yard run (Fulcher kick)	OKLA 7–0
Q1	ISU	Krefple 16 yard pass from Stanley (Goedjen kick)	Tie 7–7
Q1	ISU	Krefple 9 yard pass from Stanley (Goedjen kick)	ISU 14–7
Q2	ISU	Goedjen 22 yard field goal	ISU 17–7
Q2	OKLA	Jones 2 yard run (kick failed)	ISU 17–13
Q2	OKLA	Brooks 68 yard pass from Davis (Fulcher kick)	OKLA 20–17
Q3	OKLA	Hoffman 5 yard pass from Davis (Fulcher kick)	OKLA 27–17
Q4	OKLA	Washington 1 yard run (Fulcher kick)	OKLA 34–17

Joe Washington 136 Rush Yds

=== At Missouri ===
#3 Oklahoma Sooners at #10 Missouri Tigers

Team	1	2	3	4	Total
• #3 Oklahoma	7	3	12	9	31
#10 Missouri	3	0	0	0	3

- Date: November 10
- Location: Memorial Stadium, Columbia, Missouri
- Game attendance: 68,831

Scoring summary
1		MU	Hill 42-yard field goal	MU 3-0
1		OU	Waymon Clark 14-yard run (Rick Fulcher kick)	OU 7-3
2		OU	Rick Fulcher 39-yard field goal	OU 10-3
3		OU	Joe Washington 26-yard run (kick failed)	OU 16-3
3		OU	Billy Brooks 63-yard pass from Steve Davis (pass failed)	OU 22-3
4		OU	Rick Fulcher 30-yard field goal	OU 25-3
4	5:51	OU	Joe Washington 80-yard punt return (kick failed)	OU 31-3

=== Nebraska ===
#10 Nebraska Cornhuskers at #3 Oklahoma Sooners

Team	1	2	3	4	Total
#10 Nebraska	0	0	0	0	0
• #3 Oklahoma	14	0	6	7	27

- Date: November 23
- Location: Oklahoma Memorial Stadium, Norman, Oklahoma
- Game attendance: 61,826
- Television network: ABC

Scoring summary
1	6:55	OU	Waymon Clark 2-yard run (Rick Fulcher kick)	OU 7-0
1	0:01	OU	Steve Davis 47-yard run (Rick Fulcher kick)	OU 14-0
3	2:37	OU	Steve Davis 1-yard run (pass failed)	OU 20-0
4	2:11	OU	Steve Davis 8-yard run (Rick Fulcher kick)	OU 27-0

=== At Oklahoma State ===
#2 Oklahoma Sooners at Oklahoma State Cowboys

Team	1	2	3	4	Total
• #2 Oklahoma	7	14	7	17	45
Oklahoma State	0	3	3	12	18

- Date: December 1
- Location: Lewis Field, Stillwater, Oklahoma
- Game attendance: 50,511

Scoring summary
1		OU	Steve Davis 7-yard run (Rick Fulcher kick)	OU 7-0
2		OU	Waymon Clark 7-yard run (Rick Fulcher kick)	OU 14-0
2		OSU	Daigle 50-yard field goal	OU 14-3
2	2:52	OU	Steve Davis 9-yard run (Rick Fulcher kick)	OU 21-3
3		OSU	Daigle 36-yard field goal	OU 21-6
3		OU	Steve Dodd recovered punt in end zone (Rick Fulcher kick)	OU 28-6
4		OU	Rick Fulcher 38-yard field goal	OU 31-6
4		OU	Steve Davis 8-yard run (Rick Fulcher kick)	OU 38-6
4		OU	Scott Hill 10-yard run (Rick Fulcher kick)	OU 45-6
4		OSU	Charlie Weatherbie 8-yard run (pass failed)	OU 45-12
4		OSU	Charlie Weatherbie 5-yard run (pass failed)	OU 45-18

== Personnel ==
1973 Oklahoma Sooners football team roster
Players
Coaches
Offense

Pos.	#	Name	Class
OL	74	Jerry Arnold	Jr
RB	20	Bob Berg	Jr
WR	82	Billy Brooks	Jr
RB		Grant Burget
RB		Waymon Clark
OL		Kyle Davis
QB		Steve Davis
OT	77	Eddie Foster (C)	Sr
RB		Jerry Foster
RB		Randy Harris
QB	7	Scott Hill	Fr
WR		Wayne Hoffman
RB		David James
RB		Steve Jenkinson
RB		Jim Littrell
QB		Jeff Mabry
RB		Danny McClure
RB		Joe McReynolds	So
WR	11	Tinker Owens	So
OL		John Roush
RB		Clyde Russell
RB		Joe Washington
OL		Terry Webb
RB		Tim Welch
RB		Gary Young

Defense

Pos.	#	Name	Class
DE	88	Gary Baccus (C)	Sr
DL		Jimbo Elrod
LB	41	Gary Gibbs	Jr
DB		Randy Hughes
DB		Durwood Keeton
DB		Terry Peters
DB		Ken Pope
DB		Clyde Powers
DT	91	Dewey Selmon	So
DT	93	Lee Roy Selmon	So
NG	98	Lucious Selmon (C)	Sr
LB		Rod Shoate
LB		Dave Smith
DL		Mike Struck

Special teams

Pos.	#	Name	Class
K		Tony DiRienzo
K	8	Rick Fulcher	Sr

Head coach

- Barry Switzer

Coordinators/assistant coaches

- Donnie Duncan
- Galen Hall (OC)
- Warren Harper (LB)
- Gene Hochevar
- Larry Lacewell (DC)
- Wendell Mosley (RB)
- Rex Norris (DL)
- Jerry Pettibone

Legend

- (C) Team captain
- (S) Suspended
- (I) Ineligible
- Injured
- Redshirt

Roster

== NFL draft ==
Seven Sooners were selected in the 1974 NFL draft.

Round	Pick	Player	Position	NFL team
4	85	Durwood Keeton	Defensive back	St. Louis Cardinals
5	110	Gary Baccus	Linebacker	New York Giants
5	119	Clyde Powers	Defensive back	New York Jets
9	227	Ken Pope	Defensive back	Oakland Raiders
12	296	Eddie Foster	Tackle	New England Patriots
14	349	David Smith	Linebacker	Philadelphia Eagles
16	399	Lucious Selmon	Defensive tackle	New England Patriots
