= Jim Weatherly (American football) =

American football player (born 1952)

No. 58
- Position: Center

Personal information
- Born: April 13, 1952 (age 74); Hazen, Arkansas, U.S.
- Listed height: 6 ft 3 in (1.91 m)
- Listed weight: 225 lb (102 kg)

Career information
- NFL draft: 1974: undrafted

Career history
- Oakland Raiders (1974)*; Denver Broncos (1975); Oakland Raiders (1976)*; Atlanta Falcons (1976); Washington Commanders (1978)*
- * Offseason or practice squad member only

Career NFL statistics
- Games played: 3
- Stats at Pro Football Reference

James E. Weatherly (born April 13, 1952) is an American former professional football player who was a center for the Atlanta Falcons of National Football League (NFL). He attended Mt. San Antonio College but did not play college football. He was a construction worker and played semi-professional football before playing in the NFL.
