= LeFrancis Arnold =

American football player (1952–2013)

No. 65
- Position: Offensive guard

Personal information
- Born: November 24, 1952; Los Angeles, California, U.S.
- Died: September 2, 2013 (aged 60); Los Angeles, California, U.S.
- Listed height: 6 ft 3 in (1.91 m)
- Listed weight: 245 lb (111 kg)

Career information
- High school: Compton (CA)
- College: Oregon
- NFL draft: 1974: undrafted

Career history
- Denver Broncos (1974)

Career NFL statistics
- Games played: 2
- Stats at Pro Football Reference

LeFrancis F. Arnold (November 24, 1952 – September 2, 2013) was an American professional football offensive guard who played one season for the Denver Broncos of the National Football League (NFL) in 1974. He was also drafted in the 32nd round (384) by the Houston Texans in the 1974 WFL Draft.
