= Gerard Williams (American football) =

American football player (1952–2026)

No. 30, 33, 45, 29
- Position: Cornerback

Personal information
- Born: May 25, 1952; Oklahoma City, Oklahoma, U.S.
- Died: c. April 2026 (aged 73)
- Listed height: 6 ft 1 in (1.85 m)
- Listed weight: 184 lb (83 kg)

Career information
- College: Langston
- NFL draft: 1974: undrafted

Career history
- Dallas Cowboys (1974)*; Birmingham Americans (1974); Birmingham Vulcans (1975); Los Angeles Rams (1975)*; Washington Redskins (1976–1978); San Francisco 49ers (1979); St. Louis Cardinals (1980); San Francisco 49ers (1980)
- * Offseason or practice squad member only

Career NFL statistics
- Interceptions: 13
- Fumble recoveries: 7
- Total TDs: 1
- Stats at Pro Football Reference

Gerard Anthony Williams (May 25, 1952 – c. April 2026) was an American professional football player who was a cornerback in the National Football League (NFL) for the Washington Redskins, San Francisco 49ers, and St. Louis Cardinals. He was also a member of the Birmingham Americans and Birmingham Vulcans in the World Football League (WFL). Williams played college football for the Langston Lions.

== Early life ==
Williams attended Northeast High School in Oklahoma City, Oklahoma. He accepted a football scholarship from Langston University.

In 2014, he was inducted into the Langston University Athletic Hall of Fame.

== Professional career ==
=== Dallas Cowboys ===
Williams was signed as an undrafted free agent by the Dallas Cowboys after the 1974 NFL draft. He was released before the start of the season.

=== Birmingham Americans (WFL) ===
On September 17, 1974, he signed as a free agent with the Birmingham Americans of the World Football League. He was named the starter at right cornerback and had 4 interceptions.

In 1975, the Americans suffered a financial crisis and were replaced by the Birmingham Vulcans. Williams played in 9 games and had 3 interceptions before the league folded.

=== Los Angeles Rams ===
In 1975, he signed as a free agent with the Los Angeles Rams. He was released on August 11.

=== Washington Redskins ===
On April 6, 1976, he was signed as a free agent by the Washington Redskins. He was a backup at left cornerback behind Pat Fischer. In 1977, he became a starter after Fischer suffered a pinched back nerve. He started 11 games and posted 4 interceptions.

In 1978, he was passed on the depth chart by Lemar Parrish. Williams regained his starting position after Parrish was lost for the season with a fractured forearm, finishing with 5 starts and 4 interceptions. He was released on August 27, 1979.

=== San Francisco 49ers ===
On September 6, 1979, he signed as a free agent with the San Francisco 49ers. He started 14 games at right cornerback and registered 4 interceptions. He was released on September 1, 1980.

=== St. Louis Cardinals ===
On October 22, 1980, he was signed by the St. Louis Cardinals. He was waived on November 19.

=== San Francisco 49ers ===
On November 20, 1980, he was re-signed by the San Francisco 49ers. He was released on May 14, 1981.

== Death ==
Williams's death at the age of 73 was announced on April 3, 2026.
