= Merritt Kersey =

American football player (born 1950)

No. 37
- Position: Punter

Personal information
- Born: February 22, 1950 (age 76); Alexandria, Virginia, U.S.
- Listed height: 6 ft 1 in (1.85 m)
- Listed weight: 205 lb (93 kg)

Career information
- High school: Henderson (West Chester, Pennsylvania)
- College: West Chester
- NFL draft: 1974: undrafted

Career history
- Philadelphia Eagles (1974–1975); Buffalo Bills (1976)*; Washington Redskins (1977)*; Pittsburgh Steelers (1978)*
- * Offseason or practice squad member only

Career NFL statistics
- Punts: 97
- Punting yards: 3448
- Longest punt: 59
- Yards per punt: 35.5
- Stats at Pro Football Reference

Merritt Warren Kersey (born February 22, 1950) is an American former professional football player who was a punter for the Philadelphia Eagles of the National Football League (NFL). He played college football for the West Chester Golden Rams. Attended Matoaca High School, Chesterfield County VA, where he played tight end, corner back and running back.

He was primarily a punter but also played running back in college.

== Professional career ==
After going undrafted in 1974, Kersey spent his entire rookie season starting for the Philadelphia Eagles. He punted 82 times for 2,959 yards. He was also named the starter in year two with the Eagles. However, he was replaced after starting in two games. In 1976 after his release, he signed with the Buffalo Bills, but did not play a game with them. During the 1977 preseason, he competed for the Washington Redskins starting job. He did not make the final roster. In 1978, he battled fellow punter Craig Colquitt for the Pittsburgh Steelers starting job. But he was, once again, cut and did not play a game for them.
