= Ernie Kirk =

American gridiron football player (born 1952)

No. 79
- Position: Defensive end

Personal information
- Born: April 14, 1952 (age 74); Marlin, Texas, U.S.
- Listed height: 6 ft 2 in (1.88 m)
- Listed weight: 265 lb (120 kg)

Career information
- High school: Marlin
- College: Howard Payne
- NFL draft: 1974: undrafted

Career history
- Houston Oilers (1974)*; Edmonton Eskimos (1975–1976); Houston Oilers (1977)
- * Offseason or practice squad member only

Awards and highlights
- Grey Cup champion (1975)

Ernest T. Kirk (born April 14, 1952) is an American former professional football player who played in the CFL and NFL with the Edmonton Eskimos and Houston Oilers. He won the Grey Cup with Edmonton in 1975. He played college football at Howard Payne University.
