= 1973 Liberty Bowl =

American college football game

- 15th Liberty Bowl
Kansas Jayhawks	NC State Wolfpack
(7–3–1)	(8–3)
Big Eight	ACC
18	31
Head coach: Don Fambrough	Head coach: Lou Holtz
AP / Coaches; 19 / 15	AP / Coaches; 16 / NR
	1	2	3	4	Total
Kansas	0	10	0	8	18
NC State	7	3	7	14	31
- Date: December 17, 1973
- Season: 1973
- Stadium: Memphis Memorial Stadium
- Location: Memphis, Tennessee
- MVP: FB Stan Fritts (North Carolina State)
- Referee: Robert Cooper (ACC; split crew: ACC, Big Eight)
- Attendance: 50,011

The 1973 Liberty Bowl was a college football postseason bowl game played on December 17, 1973, in Memphis, Tennessee. In the 15th edition of the Liberty Bowl, the NC State Wolfpack defeated the Kansas Jayhawks, 31–18.

== Background ==
The Wolfpack went a perfect 6–0 in Atlantic Coast Conference play, winning their first ACC title since 1968. This was the first time the Wolfpack made bowl appearances in consecutive seasons. Kansas tied for second in the Big Eight Conference but was badly thinned by injuries to key personnel. This was their first bowl appearance since 1969. This was North Carolina State's third Liberty Bowl in 10 years (1963 and 1967 being the other two times).

== Game summary ==
With the game a 10–10 tie early in the third quarter, Kansas' Bruce Adams called for a fair catch on a punt, but in the midst of heavy traffic he fell down on the field, with the ball bouncing off him. NC State recovered the ball deep in Kansas territory. Adams' argument that he was tripped were ignored by the referees (television replay appeared to show that he, indeed, had been tripped). The Wolfpack soon scored two plays later, and with momentum in their favor, scored twice more. Stan Fritts went for 83 yards on 18 carries in an MVP effort.

=== Scoring summary ===
- NC State – Stan Fritts 2 yard touchdown run (Sewell kick), 4:09 remaining in the 1st.
- Kansas – Miller 12 yard touchdown pass from Dave Jaynes (Love kick), 14:15 remaining in the 2nd.
- NC State – 33 yard field goal by Sewell, 4:54 remaining in the 2nd.
- Kansas – 28 yard field goal by Love, 0:28 remaining in the 2nd.
- NC State – Fritts 8 yard touchdown run (Sewell kick), 9:20 remaining in the 3rd.
- NC State – Charley Young 12 yard touchdown run (Sewell kick), 4:50 remaining in the 4th.
- NC State – Jim Henderson 31 yard interception return (Sewell kick), 4:03 remaining in the 4th.
- Kansas – Miller 12 yard touchdown run (Jaynes pass to Adams), :34 remaining in the 4th.

== Aftermath ==
The Jayhawks returned to the Liberty Bowl in 2022. In the next 30 years, they went to bowl games only 5 times. While the Wolfpack have not returned to the Liberty Bowl since the game, they played in 16 bowl games over the next 30 years.

== Statistics ==
Statistics	Kansas	NC State
First downs	24	17
Rushing yards	130	188
Passing yards	218	86
Passes intercepted	2	1
Fumbles–lost	2–1	2–0
Penalties–yards	4–37	3–35
Punting Average	37.0	38.0
