= 1973 Iowa State Cyclones football team =

American college football season

1973 Iowa State Cyclones football
- Conference: Big Eight Conference
- Record: 4–7 (2–5 Big 8)
- Head coach: Earle Bruce (1st season)
- Offensive coordinator: Jim Weaver (1st season)
- Defensive coordinator: Marv Braden (1st season)
- Captains: Larry Hunt; Keith Krepfle
- Home stadium: Clyde Williams Field

1973 Big Eight Conference football standings
	Conf.					Overall
Team	W		L		T	W		L		T
No. 3 Oklahoma $	7	–	0	–	0	10	–	0	–	1
No. 7 Nebraska	4	–	2	–	1	9	–	2	–	1
No. 18 Kansas	4	–	2	–	1	7	–	4	–	1
No. 17 Missouri	3	–	4	–	0	8	–	4	–	0
Oklahoma State	2	–	3	–	2	5	–	4	–	2
Colorado	2	–	5	–	0	5	–	6	–	0
Kansas State	2	–	5	–	0	5	–	6	–	0
Iowa State	2	–	5	–	0	4	–	7	–	0
$ – Conference champion; Rankings from AP Poll

The 1973 Iowa State Cyclones football team represented Iowa State University in the Big Eight Conference during the 1973 NCAA Division I football season. In their first year under head coach Earle Bruce, the Cyclones compiled a 4–7 record (2–5 against conference opponents), tied for sixth place in the conference, and outscored opponents by a combined total of 245 to 236. They played their home games at Clyde Williams Field in Ames, Iowa.

Larry Hunt and Keith Krepfle were the team captains.

== Schedule ==
Date	Time	Opponent	Site	Result	Attendance	Source
September 22	1:30 pm	Idaho*	Clyde Williams Field; Ames, IA	W 48–0	30,164	
September 29	2:00 pm	at Arkansas*	Razorback Stadium; Fayetteville, AR	L 19–21	37,830	
October 6	1:30 pm	No. 18 Colorado	Clyde Williams Field; Ames, IA	L 16–23	35,900	
October 13	2:30 pm	at BYU*	Cougar Stadium; Provo, UT	W 26–24	25,580	
October 20	1:30 pm	at Kansas State	KSU Stadium; Manhattan, KS (rivalry)	L 19–21	30,500	
October 27	1:30 pm	No. 17 Kansas^{†}	Clyde Williams Field; Ames, IA	L 20–22	35,000	
November 3	1:30 pm	at No. 3 Oklahoma	Oklahoma Memorial Stadium; Norman, OK	L 17–34	61,826	
November 10	1:30 pm	at No. 11 Nebraska	Memorial Stadium; Lincoln, NE (rivalry)	L 7–31	76,503	
November 17	1:30 pm	No. 14 Missouri	Clyde Williams Field; Ames, IA (rivalry)	W 17–7	33,000	
November 24	1:30 pm	No. 18 Oklahoma State	Clyde Williams Field; Ames, IA	W 28–12	25,000	
December 1	9:30 pm	at San Diego State*	San Diego Stadium; San Diego, CA	L 28–41	38,627	
*Non-conference game; ^{†}Homecoming; Rankings from AP Poll released prior to the game; All times are in Central time

== Roster ==
1973 Iowa State Cyclones football team roster
Players
Coaches
Offense

Pos.	#	Name	Class
C	58	Chuck Blaskovich	Sr
OT	67	Bob Bos	So
FB	40	Phil Danowsky	Jr
OT	74	Willie Gillis	Jr
WR	85	Ike Harris	Sr
QB	8	Buddy Hardeman	Fr
WR	81	Willie Jones	Sr
G	71	Dan Kneller	Sr
RB	35	Paul Konrad	So
TE	91	Keith Krepfle	Sr
OT	77	Henry Lewis	Sr
G	73	Sherman Miller	Jr
WR	27	Forry Smith
RB	33	Mike Strachan	Jr
QB	18	Wayne Stanley	So
G	57	Arlen Ciechanowski	Jr
OL	59	Jack Thomas	So

Defense

Pos.	#	Name	Class
DB	47	Matt Blair	Sr
CB	14	Randy Bozich	Jr
DE	94	Lon Coleman	Sr
S	9	Bruce Fling	Jr
CB	44	Barry Hill	Jr
DT	58	Rick Howe	Jr
LB	78	Larry Hunt	Sr
LB	55	Ted Jornov	Sr
DT	51	Tom Karr	Sr
DE	95	Ray King	So
DE	92	Andre Roundtree	Jr
LB	60	Brad Storm	Jr

Special teams

Pos.	#	Name	Class

Head coach

- Earle Bruce

Coordinators/assistant coaches

Legend

- (C) Team captain
- (S) Suspended
- (I) Ineligible
- Injured
- Redshirt
