= John O'Leary (Canadian football) =

American football player (1954–2026)

Profile
- Position: Running back

Personal information
- Born: July 10, 1954; Port Washington, New York, U.S.
- Died: September 6, 2026 (aged 72); Omaha, Nebraska, U.S.
- Listed height: 6 ft 1 in (1.85 m)
- Listed weight: 210 lb (95 kg)

Career information
- College: Nebraska
- NFL draft: 1976: 12th round, 330th overall pick

Career history
- 1977–1979: Montreal Alouettes

Awards and highlights
- Grey Cup champion (1977)

John Harold O'Leary (July 10, 1954 – September 6, 2026) was an American professional football player who was a running back for three seasons with the Montreal Alouettes of the Canadian Football League (CFL), winning a Grey Cup championship in the 1977 season.

After playing college football for the Nebraska Cornhuskers, O'Leary had three successful seasons with the Alouettes, rushing for 2,023 yards and catching another 1,217 yards, and scoring 17 touchdowns.

O'Leary died in Omaha, Nebraska, on September 6, 2026, at the age of 72.
