= 1973 Missouri Tigers football team =

American college football season

1973 Missouri Tigers football

Sun Bowl, W 34–17 vs. Auburn
- Conference: Big Eight Conference

Ranking
- AP: No. 17
- Record: 8–4 (3–4 Big 8)
- Head coach: Al Onofrio (3rd season)
- Home stadium: Memorial Stadium

1973 Big Eight Conference football standings
	Conf.					Overall
Team	W		L		T	W		L		T
No. 3 Oklahoma $	7	–	0	–	0	10	–	0	–	1
No. 7 Nebraska	4	–	2	–	1	9	–	2	–	1
No. 18 Kansas	4	–	2	–	1	7	–	4	–	1
No. 17 Missouri	3	–	4	–	0	8	–	4	–	0
Oklahoma State	2	–	3	–	2	5	–	4	–	2
Colorado	2	–	5	–	0	5	–	6	–	0
Kansas State	2	–	5	–	0	5	–	6	–	0
Iowa State	2	–	5	–	0	4	–	7	–	0
$ – Conference champion; Rankings from AP Poll

The 1973 Missouri Tigers football team was an American football team that represented the University of Missouri in the Big Eight Conference (Big 8) during the 1973 NCAA Division I football season. The team compiled an 8–4 record (3–4 against Big 8 opponents), finished in fifth place in the Big 8, and outscored opponents by a combined total of 219 to 152. Al Onofrio was the head coach for the third of seven seasons. The team played its home games at Faurot Field in Columbia, Missouri.

The team's statistical leaders included Tommy Reamon with 610 rushing yards, John Cherry with 743 passing yards and 895 yards of total offense, Mark Miller with 256 receiving yards, and Greg Hill with 63 points scored.

== Schedule ==
Date	Opponent	Rank	Site	Result	Attendance	Source
September 15	Ole Miss*		Faurot Field; Columbia, MO	W 17–0	51,620	
September 22	Virginia*	No. 20	Faurot Field; Columbia, MO	W 31–7	42,250	
September 29	at North Carolina*	No. 20	Kenan Memorial Stadium; Chapel Hill, NC	W 27–14	40,500	
October 6	at No. 19 SMU*	No. 15	Texas Stadium; Irving, TX	W 17–7	19,675	
October 13	No. 2 Nebraska	No. 12	Faurot Field; Columbia, MO (rivalry)	W 13–12	68,170	
October 20	Oklahoma State	No. 7	Faurot Field; Columbia, MO	W 13–9	57,491	
October 27	at Colorado	No. 7	Folsom Field; Boulder, CO	L 13–17	51,425	
November 3	Kansas State	No. 12	Faurot Field; Columbia, MO	W 31–7	51,931	
November 10	No. 3 Oklahoma	No. 10	Faurot Field; Columbia, MO (rivalry)	L 3–31	68,831	
November 17	at Iowa State	No. 14	Clyde Williams Field; Ames, IA (rivalry)	L 7–17	33,000	
November 24	at No. 20 Kansas	No. 19	Memorial Stadium; Lawrence, KS (Border War)	L 13–14	46,500	
December 29	vs. Auburn*		Sun Bowl; El Paso, TX (Sun Bowl)	W 34–17	30,127	
*Non-conference game; Rankings from AP Poll released prior to the game
