= 1973 Kansas State Wildcats football team =

American college football season

1973 Kansas State Wildcats football
- Conference: Big Eight Conference
- Record: 5–6 (2–5 Big 8)
- Head coach: Vince Gibson (7th season)
- Home stadium: KSU Stadium

1973 Big Eight Conference football standings
	Conf.					Overall
Team	W		L		T	W		L		T
No. 3 Oklahoma $	7	–	0	–	0	10	–	0	–	1
No. 7 Nebraska	4	–	2	–	1	9	–	2	–	1
No. 18 Kansas	4	–	2	–	1	7	–	4	–	1
No. 17 Missouri	3	–	4	–	0	8	–	4	–	0
Oklahoma State	2	–	3	–	2	5	–	4	–	2
Colorado	2	–	5	–	0	5	–	6	–	0
Kansas State	2	–	5	–	0	5	–	6	–	0
Iowa State	2	–	5	–	0	4	–	7	–	0
$ – Conference champion; Rankings from AP Poll

The 1973 Kansas State Wildcats football team represented Kansas State University in the 1973 NCAA Division I football season. The team's head football coach was Vince Gibson. The Wildcats played their home games in KSU Stadium. 1973 saw the wildcats finish with a record of 5–6 overall and a 2–5 record in Big Eight Conference play.

== Schedule ==
Date	Time	Opponent	Site	Result	Attendance	Source
September 15		at No. 14 Florida*	Florida Field; Gainesville, FL	L 10–21	50,673	
September 22		Tulsa*	KSU Stadium; Manhattan, KS	W 21–0	27,500	
September 29	6:38 p.m.	at Tampa*	Tampa Stadium; Tampa, FL	W 17–16	25,578	
October 6	1:30 p.m.	Memphis State*	KSU Stadium; Manhattan, KS	W 21–16	34,970	
October 13		at No. 19 Kansas	Memorial Stadium; Lawrence, KS (rivalry)	L 18–25	52,000	
October 20		Iowa State	KSU Stadium; Manhattan, KS (rivalry)	W 21–19	30,500	
October 27		No. 3 Oklahoma^{†}	KSU Stadium; Manhattan, KS	L 14–56	34,500	
November 3		at No. 12 Missouri	Faurot Field; Columbia, MO	L 7–31	51,931	
November 10		at Oklahoma State	Lewis Field; Stillwater, OK	L 9–28	38,000	
November 17		No. 10 Nebraska	KSU Stadium; Manhattan, KS (rivalry)	L 21–50	42,000	
November 23		at Colorado	Folsom Field; Boulder, CO (rivalry)	W 17–14	39,771	
*Non-conference game; ^{†}Homecoming; Rankings from AP Poll released prior to the game; All times are in Central time

== Roster ==
1973 Kansas State Wildcats football team roster
Players
Coaches
Offense

Pos.	#	Name	Class
FB	32	Don Calhoun	Sr
TE	83	Henry Childs	Sr
QB	11	Steve Grogan	Jr

Defense

Pos.	#	Name	Class

Special teams

Pos.	#	Name	Class

Head coach

- Vince Gibson

Coordinators/assistant coaches

Legend

- (C) Team captain
- (S) Suspended
- (I) Ineligible
- Injured
- Redshirt
