= Mitch Sutton =

American football player (1951–1985)

No. 79
- Position: Defensive end

Personal information
- Born: May 10, 1951; Stone Mountain, Georgia, U.S.
- Died: August 4, 1985 (aged 34); Lawrenceville, Georgia, U.S.
- Listed height: 6 ft 4 in (1.93 m)
- Listed weight: 260 lb (118 kg)

Career information
- High school: Stone Mountain (GA)
- College: Kansas
- NFL draft: 1974: 3rd round, 63rd overall pick

Career history
- Philadelphia Eagles (1974–1975)

Awards and highlights
- Second-team All-Big Eight (1973)

Career NFL statistics
- Sacks: 3.5
- Fumble recoveries: 2
- Stats at Pro Football Reference

Mitchell Andrew Sutton (May 10, 1951 – August 4, 1985) was an American professional football defensive end. He played for the Philadelphia Eagles from 1974 to 1975.
