= Boyd Brown (American football) =

American football player (1952–2014)

No. 87, 83
- Position: Tight end

Personal information
- Born: May 24, 1952; Crosby, Mississippi, U.S.
- Died: December 18, 2014 (aged 62); Natchez, Mississippi, U.S.
- Listed height: 6 ft 4 in (1.93 m)
- Listed weight: 222 lb (101 kg)

Career information
- High school: Wilkinson County (Woodville, Mississippi)
- College: Alcorn State
- NFL draft: 1974: 17th round, 432nd overall pick

Career history
- Denver Broncos (1974–1976); New York Giants (1977)
- Stats at Pro Football Reference

Boyd Brown (May 24, 1952 - December 18, 2014) was a former American football tight end. He played for the Denver Broncos from 1974 to 1976 and for the New York Giants in 1977.
