= 1973 Colorado Buffaloes football team =

American college football season

1973 Colorado Buffaloes football
- Conference: Big Eight Conference
- Record: 5–6 (2–5 Big 8)
- Head coach: Eddie Crowder (11th season)
- Offensive coordinator: Kay Dalton (2nd season)
- Offensive scheme: Pro-I
- Defensive coordinator: Dan Radakovich (2nd season)
- Base defense: 5–2
- MVP: J. V. Cain
- Captains: Randy Geist; William McDonald
- Home stadium: Folsom Field

1973 Big Eight Conference football standings
	Conf.					Overall
Team	W		L		T	W		L		T
No. 3 Oklahoma $	7	–	0	–	0	10	–	0	–	1
No. 7 Nebraska	4	–	2	–	1	9	–	2	–	1
No. 18 Kansas	4	–	2	–	1	7	–	4	–	1
No. 17 Missouri	3	–	4	–	0	8	–	4	–	0
Oklahoma State	2	–	3	–	2	5	–	4	–	2
Colorado	2	–	5	–	0	5	–	6	–	0
Kansas State	2	–	5	–	0	5	–	6	–	0
Iowa State	2	–	5	–	0	4	–	7	–	0
$ – Conference champion; Rankings from AP Poll

The 1973 Colorado Buffaloes football team represented the University of Colorado in the Big Eight Conference during the 1973 NCAA Division I football season. Led by 11-year head coach Eddie Crowder, the Buffaloes compiled an overall record of 5–6 overall with a mark of 2–5 in conference play, tying for sixth place in the Big 8. Colorado played home games on campus at Folsom Field in Boulder, Colorado.

After rallying to defeat No. 7 Missouri to improve to 5–2, CU dropped its final four games and incurred its first losing season in five years. Also the athletic director since 1965, Crowder stepped down as head coach in December; he was succeeded in January 1974 by Bill Mallory, the head coach at undefeated Miami University in Ohio.

== Schedule ==
Date	Opponent	Rank	Site	TV	Result	Attendance	Source
September 15	at No. 15 LSU*	No. 10	Tiger Stadium; Baton Rouge, LA		L 6–17	71,239	
September 22	at Wisconsin*	No. 19	Camp Randall Stadium; Madison, WI		W 28–25	58,237	
September 29	Baylor*		Folsom Field; Boulder, CO		W 52–28	48,041	
October 6	at Iowa State	No. 18	Clyde Williams Field; Ames, IA		W 23–16	35,900	
October 13	Air Force*	No. 17	Folsom Field; Boulder, CO		W 38–17	50,115	
October 20	at No. 3 Oklahoma	No. 16	Oklahoma Memorial Stadium; Norman, OK		L 7–34	61,826	
October 27	No. 7 Missouri^{†}		Folsom Field; Boulder, CO		W 17–13	51,425	
November 3	at No. 13 Nebraska	No. 17	Memorial Stadium; Lincoln, NE (rivalry)		L 16–28	76,555	
November 10	at No. 18 Kansas		Memorial Stadium; Lawrence, KS	ABC	L 15–17	34,000	
November 17	Oklahoma State		Folsom Field; Boulder, CO		L 24–38	50,169	
November 24	Kansas State		Folsom Field; Boulder, CO (rivalry)		L 14–17	39,771	
*Non-conference game; ^{†}Homecoming; Rankings from AP Poll released prior to the game

== Roster ==
1973 Colorado Buffaloes football team roster
Players
Coaches
Offense

Pos.	#	Name	Class
RB	26	Charlie Davis
RB	41	Bo Matthews	Sr
OT	70	Mark Koncar
TE	89	J.V. Cain	Sr

Defense

Pos.	#	Name	Class
DE	86	Whitney Paul

Special teams

Pos.	#	Name	Class

Head coach

- Eddie Crowder (11th year)

Coordinators/assistant coaches

Legend

- (C) Team captain
- (S) Suspended
- (I) Ineligible
- Injured
- Redshirt

Roster
