= Blackshirts (American football) =

Starting defensive players of the Nebraska Cornhuskers football team

Blackshirts logo

The Blackshirts are the starting defensive players for the Nebraska Cornhuskers football team, a reference to the black jerseys worn by the unit during practice.

== Origin ==
In 1964, the NCAA ended the one-platoon system, allowing unlimited substitutions to create dedicated offensive, defensive, and special teams units. Nebraska head coach Bob Devaney ensured his units would be visually distinguishable during practice by having them wear contrasting colors, and tasked assistant Mike Corgan with obtaining new jersey pullovers for defensive players. Defensive line coach George Kelly later said the use of black was "an accident of availability," because the store Corgan visited gave him a discount on the color. The jerseys likely began use prior to Nebraska's 1964 game at Minnesota, the first game Devaney used a two-platoon system.

Initially, black jerseys were only assigned to defensive players who practiced and performed well; those who failed to earn a black jersey were instead given gray. "There probably wasn't a day when we didn't make switches," said Kelly. Kelly was often heard yelling at his "black shirts" (later shortened to a single word) and is credited with coining the term, which caught on quickly with fans and local media.

== Use ==
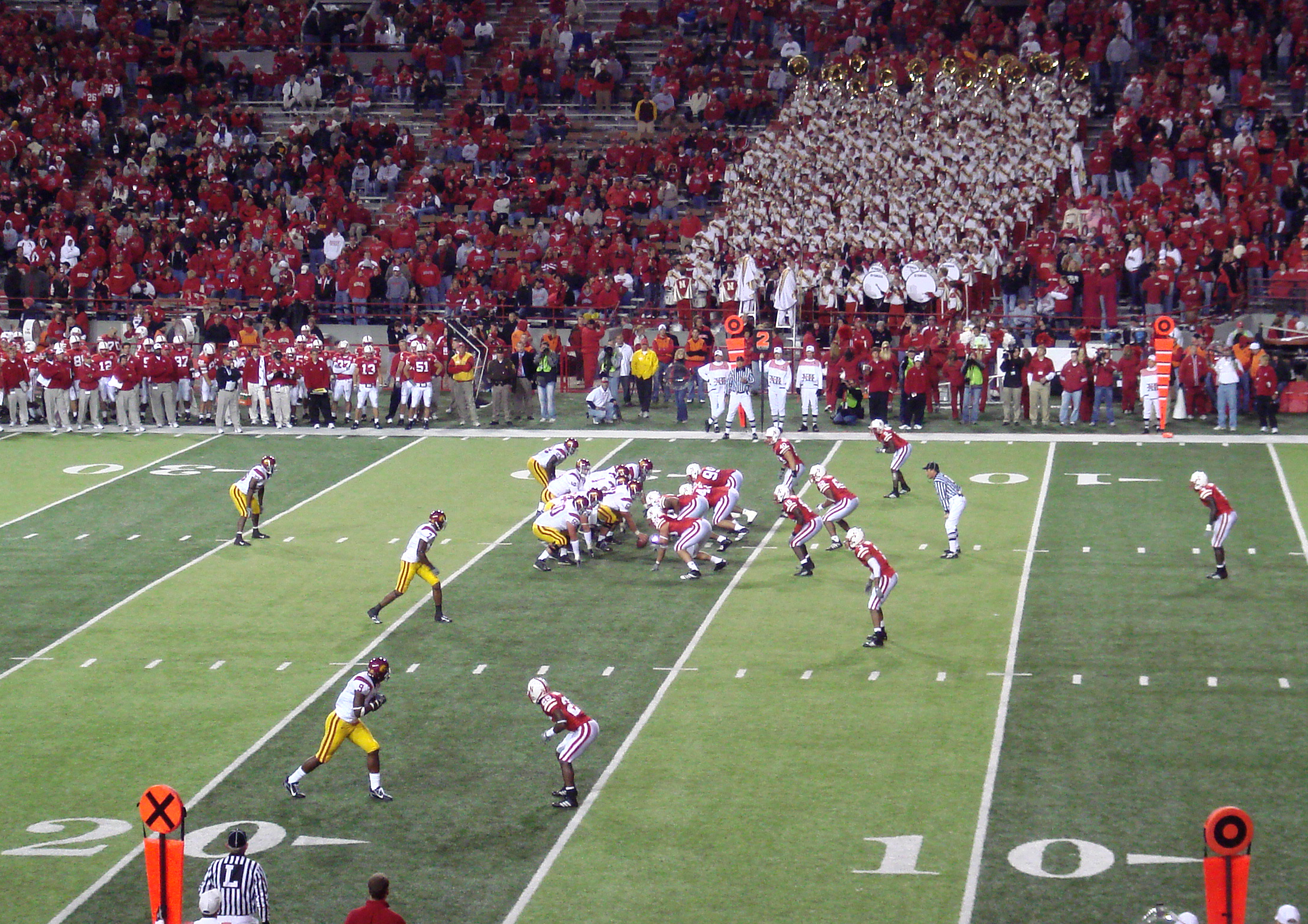
The Blackshirts on the field against USC on September 15, 2007

Tom Osborne, Devaney's successor as head coach, ended the practice of redistributing Blackshirts, instead presenting them to starters before the season's first game. Subsequent coaches have adjusted the tradition – Bill Callahan also included key reserve players, while Bo Pelini did not award Blackshirts until midseason. Some special teams players have been given an honorary Blackshirt.

Two decades after the tradition began, screen printer Tim Riley created a logo depicting a skull and crossbones wearing a helmet. It debuted on a banner at Memorial Stadium in 1985, accompanied by a stencil-font "Blackshirts." Riley trademarked the logo and later sold its rights to the University of Nebraska–Lincoln. An updated version was created in 2022. In 1996, lineman Jason Peter began crossing his forearms in an "X" to celebrate big plays. This was termed "throwing the bones" and is often replicated by defenders and fans.

Nebraska wore Blackshirt-themed alternate uniforms in 2019 and 2020.

=== Suspensions ===
The use of Blackshirts has been suspended several times since Osborne's retirement, usually after poor defensive performances. In 2007, captain Zack Bowman led a player movement to forfeit Blackshirts in the midst of a season in which NU was one of the country's worst defensive teams; they were restored in October of the following season.

Blackshirts were suspended after a loss to Minnesota in 2013, and following the firing of Scott Frost in 2022.

== Other uses ==
Nebraska's football student section at Memorial Stadium is named the "Boneyard."

Players from Nebraska's volleyball team are referred to as the "Blackshorts."

McCook brewery Loop Brewing Company brews a black india pale ale called the "Blackshirt IPA."
