= 1973 UMass Minutemen football team =

American college football season

1973 UMass Minutemen football
- Conference: Yankee Conference
- Record: 6–5 (4–2 Yankee)
- Head coach: Dick MacPherson (3rd season)
- Home stadium: Alumni Stadium

1973 Yankee Conference football standings
	Conf.					Overall
Team	W		L		T	W		L		T
Connecticut $	5	–	0	–	1	8	–	2	–	1
Rhode Island	4	–	1	–	1	6	–	2	–	2
UMass	4	–	2	–	0	6	–	5	–	0
New Hampshire	2	–	3	–	0	4	–	5	–	0
Boston University	2	–	3	–	0	3	–	7	–	0
Maine	2	–	4	–	0	3	–	7	–	0
Vermont	1	–	5	–	0	3	–	6	–	0
$ – Conference champion

The 1973 UMass Minutemen football team represented the University of Massachusetts Amherst in the 1973 NCAA Division II football season as a member of the Yankee Conference in NCAA Division II. The team was coached by Dick MacPherson and played its home games at Alumni Stadium in Hadley, Massachusetts. UMass finished the season with a record of 6–5 overall and 4–2 in conference play.

== Schedule ==
Date	Time	Opponent	Site	Result	Attendance	Source
September 8		Holy Cross*	Alumni Stadium; Hadley, MA	L 28–30	18,100	
September 15	1:00 p.m.	Villanova*	Alumni Stadium; Hadley, MA	W 21–20	12,100	
September 22		Maine	Alumni Stadium; Hadley, MA	W 20–0	11,800	
September 29		at Harvard*	Harvard Stadium; Boston, MA	L 7–24	19,100–19,200	
October 6		at Rutgers*	Rutgers Stadium; Piscataway, NJ	W 25–22	11,000	
October 13		Boston University	Alumni Stadium; Hadley, MA	W 20–6	6,679	
October 20		Rhode Island	Alumni Stadium; Hadley, MA	L 35–41	14,500	
October 27		at Connecticut	Memorial Stadium; Storrs, CT (rivalry)	L 6–28	15,551	
November 3		Vermont	Alumni Stadium; Hadley, MA	W 27–7	11,300	
November 17		at New Hampshire	Cowell Stadium; Durham, NH (rivalry)	W 28–7	8,500–9,035	
November 24		at Boston College*	Alumni Stadium; Chestnut Hill, MA (rivalry)	L 14–59	19,227	
*Non-conference game; All times are in Eastern time
