= 1973 Lafayette Leopards football team =

American college football season

1973 Lafayette Leopards football
- Conference: Independent
- Record: 6–3–1
- Head coach: Neil Putnam (3rd season)
- Captains: Thomas Kubler; James Nolan
- Home stadium: Fisher Field

1973 NCAA Division II independents football records
	Conf.			Overall
Team	W	L	T	W		L		T
No. 1 Tennessee State		–		10	–	0	–	0
No. 9 Hawaii		–		9	–	2	–	0
Nebraska–Omaha		–		7	–	2	–	1
Trinity (TX)		–		8	–	3	–	0
UNLV		–		8	–	3	–	0
No. 13 Delaware ^		–		8	–	4	–	0
Western Carolina		–		6	–	3	–	1
Central Michigan		–		7	–	4	–	0
Nevada		–		7	–	4	–	0
Western Illinois		–		7	–	4	–	0
Milwaukee		–		6	–	4	–	1
Eastern Michigan		–		6	–	4	–	0
American International		–		5	–	4	–	0
Akron		–		6	–	5	–	0
Central State (OH)		–		6	–	5	–	0
Ball State		–		5	–	5	–	1
Wayne State (MI)		–		5	–	5	–	0
Drexel		–		4	–	4	–	0
Bucknell		–		3	–	4	–	2
Northeast Louisiana		–		3	–	5	–	2
Santa Clara		–		4	–	6	–	0
Youngstown State		–		4	–	6	–	0
Arkansas–Pine Bluff		–		3	–	5	–	1
Chattanooga		–		4	–	7	–	0
Indiana State		–		4	–	7	–	0
Northeastern		–		3	–	6	–	0
Kentucky State		–		3	–	8	–	0
Northern Michigan		–		2	–	7	–	1
Eastern Illinois		–		2	–	9	–	0
Portland State		–		1	–	10	–	0
^ – NCAA Division II playoff participant; Rankings from AP small college poll

The 1973 Lafayette Leopards football team was an American football team that represented Lafayette College as an independent during the 1973 NCAA Division II football season. In their third year under head coach Neil Putnam, the Leopards compiled a 6–3–1 record. Thomas Kubler and James Nolan were the team captains. Lafayette played its home games at Fisher Field on College Hill in Easton, Pennsylvania.

== Schedule ==
Date	Opponent	Site	Result	Attendance	Source
September 15	at Merchant Marine	Tomb Field; Kings Point, NY	W 21–3	4,000–4,500	
September 22	Colgate	Fisher Field; Easton, PA	L 21–55	6,000	
September 29	Penn	Fisher Field; Easton, PA	W 16–14	10,000	
October 6	C.W. Post	Fisher Field; Easton, PA	W 28–12	4,000	
October 13	at Rutgers	Rutgers Stadium; Piscataway, NJ	L 6–35	10,000	
October 20	Bucknell^{†}	Fisher Field; Easton, PA	T 0–0	10,000	
October 27	Maine	Fisher Field; Easton, PA	W 23–13	4,000	
November 3	at Gettysburg	Musselman Stadium; Gettysburg, PA	W 19–3	4,000–5,200	
November 10	Drexel	Fisher Field; Easton, PA	W 21–11	3,000–3,100	
November 17	at Lehigh	Taylor Stadium; Bethlehem, PA (The Rivalry)	L 13–45	18,000	
^{†}Homecoming
