= 1972 Colgate Red Raiders football team =

American college football season

1972 Colgate Red Raiders football
- Conference: Independent
- Record: 5–4–1
- Head coach: Neil Wheelwright (5th season)
- Captains: Kenneth Nelson; David Palmer
- Home stadium: Andy Kerr Stadium

1972 NCAA University Division independents football records
	Conf.			Overall
Team	W	L	T	W		L		T
No. 10 Penn State		–		10	–	2	–	0
No. 14 Notre Dame		–		8	–	3	–	0
Utah State		–		8	–	3	–	0
West Virginia		–		8	–	4	–	0
Florida State		–		7	–	4	–	0
Northern Illinois		–		7	–	4	–	0
Rutgers		–		7	–	4	–	0
No. 20 Georgia Tech		–		7	–	4	–	1
Air Force		–		6	–	4	–	0
Army		–		6	–	4	–	0
Virginia Tech		–		6	–	4	–	1
Houston		–		6	–	4	–	1
Tulane		–		6	–	5	–	0
Temple		–		5	–	4	–	0
Colgate		–		5	–	4	–	1
Holy Cross		–		5	–	4	–	1
Syracuse		–		5	–	6	–	0
Miami (FL)		–		5	–	6	–	0
Dayton		–		4	–	6	–	1
Boston College		–		4	–	7	–	0
Navy		–		4	–	7	–	0
South Carolina		–		4	–	7	–	0
Southern Miss		–		3	–	7	–	1
Xavier		–		3	–	8	–	0
Marshall		–		2	–	8	–	0
Cincinnati		–		2	–	9	–	0
Villanova		–		2	–	9	–	0
Pittsburgh		–		1	–	10	–	0
Rankings from AP Poll

The 1972 Colgate Red Raiders football team was an American football team that represented Colgate University as an independent during the 1972 NCAA University Division football season. In its fifth season under head coach Neil Wheelwright, the team compiled a 5–4–1 record. Kenneth Nelson and David Palmer were the team captains.

The team played its home games at Andy Kerr Stadium in Hamilton, New York.

== Schedule ==
Date	Opponent	Site	Result	Attendance	Source
September 23	Lafayette	Andy Kerr Stadium; Hamilton, NY	W 33–14	5,500	
September 30	at Cornell	Schoellkopf Field; Ithaca, NY (rivalry)	L 7–37	15,000	
October 7	at Yale	Yale Bowl; New Haven, CT	L 7–27	6,074	
October 14	Holy Cross	Andy Kerr Stadium; Hamilton, NY	T 21–21	7,500	
October 21	at Princeton	Palmer Stadium; Princeton, NJ	W 35–26	16,000	
October 28	at The Citadel	Johnson Hagood Stadium; Charleston, SC	W 28–26	15,290	
November 4	Lehigh	Andy Kerr Stadium; Hamilton, NY	W 42–34	2,500	
November 11	at Bucknell	Memorial Stadium; Lewisburg, PA	L 7–41	5,200	
November 18	at Boston University	Nickerson Field; Boston, MA	W 26–0	5,000	
November 25	at Rutgers	Rutgers Stadium; Piscataway, NJ	L 13–43	9,000	

== Leading players ==
Two trophies were awarded to the Red Raiders' most valuable players in 1972:

- Tom Parr, quarterback, received the Andy Kerr Trophy, awarded to the most valuable offensive player.
- Dave Palmer, defensive tackle, received the Hal W. Lahar Trophy, awarded to the most valuable defensive player.

Statistical leaders for the 1972 Red Raiders included:

- Rushing: Tom Parr, 721 yards and 12 touchdowns on 145 attempts
- Passing: Tom Parr, 1,206 yards, 83 completions and 9 touchdowns on 169 attempts
- Receiving: Steve Fraser, 535 yards and 4 touchdowns on 29 receptions
- Total offense: Tom Parr, 1,927 yards (1,206 passing, 721 rushing)
- Scoring: Tom Parr, 74 points from 12 touchdowns and 1 two-point conversion
- All-purpose yards: Russell Brown, 886 yards (450 rushing, 267 kickoff returning, 93 punt returning, 76 receiving)
