= 1973 Temple Owls football team =

American college football season

1973 Temple Owls football
- Conference: Independent
- Record: 9–1
- Head coach: Wayne Hardin (4th season)
- Captain: Dwight Fulton
- Home stadium: Temple Stadium

1973 NCAA Division I independents football records
	Conf.			Overall
Team	W	L	T	W		L		T
No. 1 Notre Dame		–		11	–	0	–	0
No. 5 Penn State		–		12	–	0	–	0
No. 9 Houston		–		11	–	1	–	0
Temple		–		9	–	1	–	0
No. 20 Tulane		–		9	–	3	–	0
Memphis State		–		8	–	3	–	0
Tampa		–		8	–	3	–	0
Boston College		–		7	–	4	–	0
South Carolina		–		7	–	4	–	0
Utah State		–		7	–	4	–	0
Air Force		–		6	–	4	–	0
Southern Miss		–		6	–	4	–	1
Northern Illinois		–		6	–	5	–	0
Rutgers		–		6	–	5	–	0
West Virginia		–		6	–	5	–	0
Pittsburgh		–		6	–	5	–	1
Colgate		–		5	–	5	–	0
Dayton		–		5	–	5	–	1
Xavier		–		5	–	5	–	1
Georgia Tech		–		5	–	6	–	0
Holy Cross		–		5	–	6	–	0
Miami (FL)		–		5	–	6	–	0
Cincinnati		–		4	–	7	–	0
Marshall		–		4	–	7	–	0
Navy		–		4	–	7	–	0
Southern Illinois		–		3	–	7	–	1
Villanova		–		3	–	8	–	0
Syracuse		–		2	–	9	–	0
Virginia Tech		–		2	–	9	–	0
Army		–		0	–	10	–	0
Florida State		–		0	–	11	–	0
Rankings from AP Poll

The 1973 Temple Owls football team was an American football team that represented Temple University as an independent during the 1973 NCAA Division I football season. In its fourth season under head coach Wayne Hardin, the team compiled a 9–1 record and outscored opponents by a total of 353 to 167.

Defensive back Dwight Fulton was elected as the team captain. The team's statistical leaders included:

- Senior halfback Tom Sloan led the team with 1,036 rushing yards on 173 carries for an average of 6.0 yards per carry. Against Akron on September 22, he rushed for 198 yard, breaking Temple's prior single-game rushing record of 176 yards set by Mike Busch in 1967.
- Fullback Henry Hynoski led the team with 60 points scored. He also ranked second in rushing with 881 yards on 156 carries. He was described as a back who "loves contact" and "hunted for someone to run over."
- Quarterback Steve Joachim, who was rated as the best high school passer in the country and originally played for Penn State, completed 80 of 159 passes (50.3%) for 1,312 yards, 11 touchdowns, and 10 interceptions.
- Tight end Randy Grossman with 683 receiving yards, and Coach Hardin rated him as the best tight end he ever coached and the best in Temple history.

The team played its home games at Temple Stadium in Philadelphia.

== Schedule ==
Date	Time	Opponent	Site	Result	Attendance	Source
September 8	7:30 p.m.	Xavier	Temple Stadium; Philadelphia, PA	W 49–7	10,753	
September 15		at Boston College	Alumni Stadium; Chestnut Hill, MA	L 0–45	27,710	
September 22		Akron	Temple Stadium; Philadelphia, PA	W 47–33	9,051	
September 29		at Holy Cross	Fitton Field; Worcester, MA	W 63–34	16,420	
October 6	7:30 p.m.	Cincinnati	Temple Stadium; Philadelphia, PA	W 16–15	9,471	
October 20		Boston University	Temple Stadium; Philadelphia, PA	W 35–15	9,692	
October 27		at Delaware	Delaware Stadium; Newark, DE	W 31–8	23,619	
November 10		Rhode Island	Temple Stadium; Philadelphia, PA	W 43–0	10,904	
November 17		at Drake	Drake Stadium; Des Moines, IA	W 35–10	6,620	
November 24	1:30 p.m.	at Villanova	Villanova Stadium; Villanova, PA (Mayor's Cup)	W 34–0	13,350	
All times are in Eastern time
