= 1972 Boston University Terriers football team =

American college football season

1972 Boston University Terriers football
- Conference: Independent
- Record: 2–8
- Head coach: Larry Naviaux (4th season)
- Home stadium: Nickerson Field

1972 NCAA College Division independents football records
	Conf.			Overall
Team	W	L	T	W		L		T
No. 4 Ashland		–		11	–	0	–	0
Bridgeport		–		11	–	0	–	0
No. 1 Delaware		–		10	–	0	–	0
No. 5 Tennessee State		–		11	–	1	–	0
Colorado College		–		8	–	1	–	0
Tampa		–		10	–	2	–	0
Trinity (TX)		–		8	–	2	–	0
Western Carolina		–		7	–	2	–	1
Hawaii		–		8	–	3	–	0
Indiana State		–		7	–	3	–	0
Northeastern		–		6	–	2	–	0
Bucknell		–		6	–	3	–	0
Cortland		–		6	–	3	–	0
San Diego		–		6	–	3	–	1
Arkansas–Pine Bluff		–		4	–	2	–	1
Eastern Michigan		–		6	–	4	–	0
Milwaukee		–		6	–	4	–	0
Samford		–		5	–	3	–	2
Ball State		–		5	–	4	–	1
Lake Forest		–		4	–	3	–	1
Nevada		–		6	–	5	–	0
Central Michigan		–		5	–	5	–	1
Rose-Hulman		–		5	–	5	–	0
Santa Clara		–		4	–	4	–	1
Akron		–		3	–	4	–	2
St. Norbert		–		4	–	5	–	0
Saint Mary's		–		3	–	4	–	0
Kentucky State		–		4	–	6	–	0
Drexel		–		3	–	6	–	0
Northeast Louisiana		–		3	–	7	–	0
Portland State		–		3	–	8	–	0
Wayne State (MI)		–		2	–	5	–	1
Boston University		–		2	–	8	–	0
Northern Michigan		–		2	–	8	–	0
Saint Peter's		–		2	–	8	–	0
Chattanooga		–		2	–	9	–	0
Southern Illinois		–		1	–	8	–	1
Illinois College		–		1	–	8	–	0
Eastern Illinois		–		1	–	9	–	0
Madison		–		0	–	4	–	1
UNLV		–		1	–	10	–	0
Rankings from AP small college poll

The 1972 Boston University Terriers football team was an American football team that represented Boston University as an independent during the 1972 NCAA College Division football season. In their fourth season under head coach Larry Naviaux, the Terriers compiled a 2–8 record and were outscored by a total of 281 to 117.

== Schedule ==
Date	Opponent	Site	Result	Attendance	Source
September 15	Maine	Nickerson Field; Boston, MA	L 7–25	6,898–9,000	
September 23	at New Hampshire	Cowell Stadium; Durham, NH	L 14–16	9,874	
September 30	at No. 1 Delaware	Delaware Stadium; Newark, DE	L 12–49	15,552	
October 7	at Harvard	Harvard Stadium; Boston, MA	L 14–33	5,000	
October 14	at UMass	Alumni Stadium; Hadley, MA	L 15–44	12,500	
October 20	Temple	Nickerson Field; Boston, MA	W 17–14	6,994	
October 28	Rhode Island	Nickerson Field; Boston, MA	W 31–13	1,000–5,510	
November 3	Northeastern	Nickerson Field; Boston, MA	L 0–10	8,650	
November 11	at Rutgers	Rutgers Stadium; Piscataway, NJ	L 7–51	7,500	
November 18	Colgate	Nickerson Field; Boston, MA	L 0–26	5,000	
Rankings from AP Poll released prior to the game
