= 1973 Colgate Red Raiders football team =

American college football season

1973 Colgate Red Raiders football
- Conference: Independent
- Record: 5–5
- Head coach: Neil Wheelwright (6th season)
- Captains: Rick Horton; Tom Parr
- Home stadium: Andy Kerr Stadium

1973 NCAA Division I independents football records
	Conf.			Overall
Team	W	L	T	W		L		T
No. 1 Notre Dame		–		11	–	0	–	0
No. 5 Penn State		–		12	–	0	–	0
No. 9 Houston		–		11	–	1	–	0
Temple		–		9	–	1	–	0
No. 20 Tulane		–		9	–	3	–	0
Memphis State		–		8	–	3	–	0
Tampa		–		8	–	3	–	0
Boston College		–		7	–	4	–	0
South Carolina		–		7	–	4	–	0
Utah State		–		7	–	4	–	0
Air Force		–		6	–	4	–	0
Southern Miss		–		6	–	4	–	1
Northern Illinois		–		6	–	5	–	0
Rutgers		–		6	–	5	–	0
West Virginia		–		6	–	5	–	0
Pittsburgh		–		6	–	5	–	1
Colgate		–		5	–	5	–	0
Dayton		–		5	–	5	–	1
Xavier		–		5	–	5	–	1
Georgia Tech		–		5	–	6	–	0
Holy Cross		–		5	–	6	–	0
Miami (FL)		–		5	–	6	–	0
Cincinnati		–		4	–	7	–	0
Marshall		–		4	–	7	–	0
Navy		–		4	–	7	–	0
Southern Illinois		–		3	–	7	–	1
Villanova		–		3	–	8	–	0
Syracuse		–		2	–	9	–	0
Virginia Tech		–		2	–	9	–	0
Army		–		0	–	10	–	0
Florida State		–		0	–	11	–	0
Rankings from AP Poll

The 1973 Colgate Red Raiders football team was an American football team that represented Colgate University as an independent during the 1973 NCAA Division I football season. In its sixth season under head coach Neil Wheelwright, the team compiled a 5–5 record. Rick Horton and Tom Parr were the team captains.

The team played its home games at Andy Kerr Stadium in Hamilton, New York.

== Schedule ==
Date	Opponent	Site	Result	Attendance	Source
September 22	at Lafayette	Fisher Field; Easton, PA	W 55–21	6,000	
September 29	Cornell	Andy Kerr Stadium; Hamilton, NY (rivalry)	L 21–35	10,500	
October 6	at Yale	Yale Bowl; New Haven, CT	L 18–24	14,000	
October 13	at Holy Cross	Fitton Field; Worcester, MA	W 22–21	15,721	
October 20	at Princeton	Palmer Stadium; Princeton, NJ	L 21–37	15,500	
October 27	Bucknell	Andy Kerr Stadium; Hamilton, NY	W 41–23	6,000	
November 3	at Lehigh	Taylor Stadium; Bethlehem, PA	L 26–58	12,000	
November 10	at William & Mary	Cary Field; Williamsburg, VA	W 49–42	7,500	
November 17	Boston University	Andy Kerr Stadium; Hamilton, NY	L 0–3	3,500–4,000	
November 24	at Rutgers	Rutgers Stadium; Piscataway, NJ	W 42–0	12,000	

== Leading players ==
Two trophies were awarded to the Red Raiders' most valuable players in 1973:

- Tom Parr, quarterback, received the Andy Kerr Trophy, awarded to the most valuable offensive player.
- Rick Horton, defensive back, received the Hal W. Lahar Trophy, awarded to the most valuable defensive player.

Statistical leaders for the 1973 Red Raiders included:

- Rushing: Mark van Eeghen, 1,089 yards and 14 touchdowns on 238 attempts
- Passing: Tom Parr, 1,127 yards, 83 completions and 9 touchdowns on 165 attempts
- Receiving: Dave Lake, 433 yards and 3 touchdowns on 26 receptions
- Total offense: Tom Parr, 1,960 yards (1,127 passing, 833 rushing)
- Scoring: Mark van Eeghen, 90 points from 15 touchdowns
- All-purpose yards: Mark van Eeghen, 1,588 yards (1,089 rushing, 322 kickoff returning, 177 receiving)
