= 1972 Temple Owls football team =

American college football season

1972 Temple Owls football
- Conference: Independent
- Record: 5–4
- Head coach: Wayne Hardin (3rd season)
- Home stadium: Temple Stadium

1972 NCAA University Division independents football records
	Conf.			Overall
Team	W	L	T	W		L		T
No. 10 Penn State		–		10	–	2	–	0
No. 14 Notre Dame		–		8	–	3	–	0
Utah State		–		8	–	3	–	0
West Virginia		–		8	–	4	–	0
Florida State		–		7	–	4	–	0
Northern Illinois		–		7	–	4	–	0
Rutgers		–		7	–	4	–	0
No. 20 Georgia Tech		–		7	–	4	–	1
Air Force		–		6	–	4	–	0
Army		–		6	–	4	–	0
Virginia Tech		–		6	–	4	–	1
Houston		–		6	–	4	–	1
Tulane		–		6	–	5	–	0
Temple		–		5	–	4	–	0
Colgate		–		5	–	4	–	1
Holy Cross		–		5	–	4	–	1
Syracuse		–		5	–	6	–	0
Miami (FL)		–		5	–	6	–	0
Dayton		–		4	–	6	–	1
Boston College		–		4	–	7	–	0
Navy		–		4	–	7	–	0
South Carolina		–		4	–	7	–	0
Southern Miss		–		3	–	7	–	1
Xavier		–		3	–	8	–	0
Marshall		–		2	–	8	–	0
Cincinnati		–		2	–	9	–	0
Villanova		–		2	–	9	–	0
Pittsburgh		–		1	–	10	–	0
Rankings from AP Poll

The 1972 Temple Owls football team was an American football team that represented Temple University as an independent during the 1972 NCAA University Division football season. In its third season under head coach Wayne Hardin, the team compiled a 5–4 record and was outscored by a total of 176 to 164. The team played its home games at Temple Stadium in Philadelphia.

The team's statistical leaders included Doug Shobert with 1,416 passing yards, Paul Loughran with 593 rushing yards and 36 points scored, and Clint Graves with 707 receiving yards.

== Schedule ==
Date	Time	Opponent	Site	Result	Attendance	Source
September 9		at Syracuse	Archbold Stadium; Syracuse, NY	L 10–17	21,062	
September 16	8:00 p.m.	at Xavier	Corcoran Stadium; Cincinnati, OH	W 16–12	8,104	
September 23		at Boston College	Alumni Stadium; Chestnut Hill, MA	L 27–49	21,732	
September 30		Holy Cross	Temple Stadium; Philadelphia, PA	W 15–7	9,810	
October 14		West Virginia	Franklin Field; Philadelphia, PA	W 39–36	13,067	
October 20		at Boston University	Nickerson Field; Boston, MA	L 14–17	6,994	
October 28		Delaware	Temple Stadium; Philadelphia, PA	L 9–28	9,000–14,363	
November 11		Rhode Island	Temple Stadium; Philadelphia, PA	W 22–0	5,000	
November 18	1:33 p.m.	at Villanova	Villanova Stadium; Villanova, PA (Mayor's Cup)	W 12–10	12,631	
All times are in Eastern time
