= 1972 Connecticut Huskies football team =

American college football season

1972 Connecticut Huskies football
- Conference: Yankee Conference
- Record: 4–5 (4–1 Yankee)
- Head coach: Robert Casciola (2nd season)
- Home stadium: Memorial Stadium

1972 Yankee Conference football standings
	Conf.					Overall
Team	W		L		T	W		L		T
UMass $	5	–	0	–	0	9	–	2	–	0
Connecticut	4	–	1	–	0	4	–	5	–	0
Vermont	3	–	2	–	0	4	–	5	–	0
New Hampshire	2	–	3	–	0	4	–	5	–	0
Maine	1	–	4	–	0	3	–	6	–	0
Rhode Island	0	–	5	–	0	3	–	7	–	0
$ – Conference champion

The 1972 Connecticut Huskies football team represented the University of Connecticut in the 1972 NCAA College Division football season. The Huskies were led by second-year head coach Robert Casciola, and completed the season with a record of 4–5.

== Schedule ==
Date	Opponent	Site	Result	Attendance	Source
September 23	Vermont	Memorial Stadium; Storrs, CT	W 7–0	10,864	
September 30	at Yale*	Yale Bowl; New Haven, CT	L 7–28	14,882	
October 7	at New Hampshire	Cowell Stadium; Durham, NH	W 10–7	2,511	
October 14	at No. 2 Delaware*	Memorial Stadium; Storrs, CT	L 7–32	13,141	
October 21	Maine	Memorial Stadium; Storrs, CT	W 31–9	10,000–10,765	
October 28	at UMass	Alumni Stadium; Amherst, MA (rivalry)	L 16–49	17,500	
November 4	Rutgers*	Rutgers Stadium; Piscataway, NJ	L 13–21	10,000	
November 18	Rhode Island	Memorial Stadium; Storrs, CT (rivalry)	W 42–21	14,250–15,000	
November 25	at Holy Cross*	Fitton Field; Worcester, MA	L 10–20	14,011	
*Non-conference game; Rankings from AP Poll released prior to the game

== Roster ==
1972 UConn Huskies football team roster
Players			Coaches
Offense: Pos. / # / Name / Class; RB / 23 / Eric Torkelson / Jr	Defense: Pos. / # / Name / Class; S / 40 / Brian Herosian / Sr	Special teams: Pos. / # / Name / Class	Head coach: Robert Casciola; Coordinators/assistant coaches Legend: (C) Team captain; (S) Suspended; (I) Ineligible; Injured; Redshirt
