= 1972 Army Cadets football team =

American college football season

1972 Army Cadets football
- Conference: Independent
- Record: 6–4
- Head coach: Tom Cahill (7th season)
- Defensive coordinator: Richard S. Lyon (6th season)
- Captain: Steve Bogosian
- Home stadium: Michie Stadium

1972 NCAA University Division independents football records
	Conf.			Overall
Team	W	L	T	W		L		T
No. 10 Penn State		–		10	–	2	–	0
No. 14 Notre Dame		–		8	–	3	–	0
Utah State		–		8	–	3	–	0
West Virginia		–		8	–	4	–	0
Florida State		–		7	–	4	–	0
Northern Illinois		–		7	–	4	–	0
Rutgers		–		7	–	4	–	0
No. 20 Georgia Tech		–		7	–	4	–	1
Air Force		–		6	–	4	–	0
Army		–		6	–	4	–	0
Virginia Tech		–		6	–	4	–	1
Houston		–		6	–	4	–	1
Tulane		–		6	–	5	–	0
Temple		–		5	–	4	–	0
Colgate		–		5	–	4	–	1
Holy Cross		–		5	–	4	–	1
Syracuse		–		5	–	6	–	0
Miami (FL)		–		5	–	6	–	0
Dayton		–		4	–	6	–	1
Boston College		–		4	–	7	–	0
Navy		–		4	–	7	–	0
South Carolina		–		4	–	7	–	0
Southern Miss		–		3	–	7	–	1
Xavier		–		3	–	8	–	0
Marshall		–		2	–	8	–	0
Cincinnati		–		2	–	9	–	0
Villanova		–		2	–	9	–	0
Pittsburgh		–		1	–	10	–	0
Rankings from AP Poll

The 1972 Army Cadets football team represented the United States Military Academy as an independent during the 1972 NCAA University Division football season. Led by seventh-year head coach Tom Cahill, the Cadets compiled a record of 6–4. Army played home games at Michie Stadium in West Point, New York.

== Schedule ==
Date	Time	Opponent	Site	TV	Result	Attendance	Source
September 23	1:58 p.m.	No. 9 Nebraska	Michie Stadium; West Point, NY	ABC	L 7–77	42,239	
September 30		at Texas A&M	Kyle Field; College Station, TX		W 24–14	46,680	
October 7		Lehigh	Michie Stadium; West Point, NY		W 26–21	36,000–36,310	
October 14	1:59 p.m.	No. 15 Penn State	Michie Stadium; West Point, NY		L 0–45	42,352	
October 21	2:00 p.m.	at Rutgers	Rutgers Stadium; New Brunswick, NJ		W 35–28	20,000	
October 28	1:50 p.m.	Miami (FL)	Michie Stadium; West Point, NY		L 7–28	42,100	
November 4	1:29 p.m.	No. 19 Air Force	Michie Stadium; West Point, NY (Commander-in-Chief's Trophy)		W 17–14	42,399	
November 11		at Syracuse	Archbold Stadium; Syracuse, NY		L 6–27	19,525	
November 18	1:30 p.m.	Holy Cross	Michie Stadium; West Point, NY		W 15–13	39,441	
December 2	12:55 p.m.	vs. Navy	John F. Kennedy Stadium; Philadelphia, PA (Army–Navy Game)	ABC	W 23–15	95,774	
Rankings from AP Poll released prior to the game

== Game summaries ==
=== Navy ===
Team	1	2	3	4	Total
• Army	0	0	13	10	23
Navy	12	0	0	3	15

- Date: December 2
- Location: JFK Stadium, Philadelphia, PA
- Game attendance: 95,774

Scoring summary
1		NAVY	Cleveland Cooper 1 yard run (pass failed)	NAVY 6-0
1	0:00	NAVY	Howard 11 yard pass from Glenny (run failed)	NAVY 12-0
3		ARMY	Hines 43 yard run (Barclay kick)	NAVY 12-7
3		ARMY	Bealy 83 yard blocked field goal return (pass failed)	ARMY 13-12
4		ARMY	Simpson 21 yard run (Barclay kick)	ARMY 20-12
4		NAVY	Lanning 37 yard field goal	ARMY 20-15
4		ARMY	Barclay 23 yard field goal	ARMY 23-15

== Roster ==
- DE No. 86 Steve Bogosian (C), Sr.
