= 1972 Rutgers Scarlet Knights football team =

American college football season

1972 Rutgers Scarlet Knights football
- Conference: Independent
- Record: 7–4
- Head coach: John F. Bateman (13th season)
- Captains: Andrew Malekoff; David Rinehimer
- Home stadium: Rutgers Stadium

1972 NCAA University Division independents football records
| | Conf. | | | Overall |
| Team | W | L | T | W | | L | | T |
|---|---|---|---|---|---|---|---|---|
| No. 10 Penn State | | – | | 10 | – | 2 | – | 0 |
| No. 14 Notre Dame | | – | | 8 | – | 3 | – | 0 |
| Utah State | | – | | 8 | – | 3 | – | 0 |
| West Virginia | | – | | 8 | – | 4 | – | 0 |
| Florida State | | – | | 7 | – | 4 | – | 0 |
| Northern Illinois | | – | | 7 | – | 4 | – | 0 |
| Rutgers | | – | | 7 | – | 4 | – | 0 |
| No. 20 Georgia Tech | | – | | 7 | – | 4 | – | 1 |
| Air Force | | – | | 6 | – | 4 | – | 0 |
| Army | | – | | 6 | – | 4 | – | 0 |
| Virginia Tech | | – | | 6 | – | 4 | – | 1 |
| Houston | | – | | 6 | – | 4 | – | 1 |
| Tulane | | – | | 6 | – | 5 | – | 0 |
| Temple | | – | | 5 | – | 4 | – | 0 |
| Colgate | | – | | 5 | – | 4 | – | 1 |
| Holy Cross | | – | | 5 | – | 4 | – | 1 |
| Syracuse | | – | | 5 | – | 6 | – | 0 |
| Miami (FL) | | – | | 5 | – | 6 | – | 0 |
| Dayton | | – | | 4 | – | 6 | – | 1 |
| Boston College | | – | | 4 | – | 7 | – | 0 |
| Navy | | – | | 4 | – | 7 | – | 0 |
| South Carolina | | – | | 4 | – | 7 | – | 0 |
| Southern Miss | | – | | 3 | – | 7 | – | 1 |
| Xavier | | – | | 3 | – | 8 | – | 0 |
| Marshall | | – | | 2 | – | 8 | – | 0 |
| Cincinnati | | – | | 2 | – | 9 | – | 0 |
| Villanova | | – | | 2 | – | 9 | – | 0 |
| Pittsburgh | | – | | 1 | – | 10 | – | 0 |
Rankings from AP Poll

The 1972 Rutgers Scarlet Knights football team represented Rutgers University as an independent during the 1972 NCAA University Division football season. In their 13th and final season under head coach John F. Bateman, the Scarlet Knights compiled a 7–4 record. The team outscored its opponents 290 to 171. The team's statistical leaders included Leo Gasienica with 1,409 passing yards, J. J. Jennings with 1,262 rushing yards, and Tom Sweeney with 369 receiving yards.

The Scarlet Knights played their home games at Rutgers Stadium in Piscataway, New Jersey, across the river from the university's main campus in New Brunswick.

== Schedule ==
| Date | Time | Opponent | Site | Result | Attendance | Source |
|---|---|---|---|---|---|---|
| September 16 | | at Holy Cross | Fitton Field; Worcester, MA | L 14–24 | 15,520 | |
| September 23 | | Lehigh | Rutgers Stadium; Piscataway, NJ | W 41–13 | 11,000 | |
| September 30 | | at Princeton | Palmer Stadium; Princeton, NJ (rivalry) | L 6–7 | 22,000 | |
| October 7 | | at Cornell | Schoellkopf Field; Ithaca, NY | L 22–36 | 10,000 | |
| October 14 | | at Lafayette | Fisher Field; Easton, PA | W 21–7 | 10,000 | |
| October 21 | 2:00 p.m. | Army^{†} | Rutgers Stadium; Piscataway, NJ | L 28–35 | 20,000 | |
| October 28 | | at Columbia | Baker Field; New York, NY | W 6–3 | 3,275 | |
| November 4 | | Connecticut | Rutgers Stadium; Piscataway, NJ | W 21–13 | 10,000 | |
| November 11 | | Boston University | Rutgers Stadium; Piscataway, NJ | W 51–7 | 7,500 | |
| November 18 | | Morgan State | Rutgers Stadium; Piscataway, NJ | W 37–14 | 7,500 | |
| November 25 | | Colgate | Rutgers Stadium; Piscataway, NJ | W 43–13 | 9,000 | |
^{†}Homecoming; All times are in Eastern time

== Roster ==
1972 Rutgers Scarlet Knights football team roster
| Players | | | Coaches |
|---|---|---|---|
| Offense: Pos. / # / Name / Class; QB / 10 / Leo Gasienica / Sr | Defense: Pos. / # / Name / Class; DT / 74 / Steve Allen / Jr | Special teams: Pos. / # / Name / Class | Head coach: Terry Shea; Coordinators/assistant coaches Legend: (C) Team captain; (S) Suspended; (I) Ineligible; Injured; Redshirt |
