= 1972 Villanova Wildcats football team =

American college football season

1972 Villanova Wildcats football
- Conference: Independent
- Record: 2–9
- Head coach: Lou Ferry (3rd season)
- Defensive coordinator: John Rosenberg (1st season)
- Captains: Nick Sremenak; Kevin Reilly
- Home stadium: Villanova Stadium

1972 NCAA University Division independents football records
	Conf.			Overall
Team	W	L	T	W		L		T
No. 10 Penn State		–		10	–	2	–	0
No. 14 Notre Dame		–		8	–	3	–	0
Utah State		–		8	–	3	–	0
West Virginia		–		8	–	4	–	0
Florida State		–		7	–	4	–	0
Northern Illinois		–		7	–	4	–	0
Rutgers		–		7	–	4	–	0
No. 20 Georgia Tech		–		7	–	4	–	1
Air Force		–		6	–	4	–	0
Army		–		6	–	4	–	0
Virginia Tech		–		6	–	4	–	1
Houston		–		6	–	4	–	1
Tulane		–		6	–	5	–	0
Temple		–		5	–	4	–	0
Colgate		–		5	–	4	–	1
Holy Cross		–		5	–	4	–	1
Syracuse		–		5	–	6	–	0
Miami (FL)		–		5	–	6	–	0
Dayton		–		4	–	6	–	1
Boston College		–		4	–	7	–	0
Navy		–		4	–	7	–	0
South Carolina		–		4	–	7	–	0
Southern Miss		–		3	–	7	–	1
Xavier		–		3	–	8	–	0
Marshall		–		2	–	8	–	0
Cincinnati		–		2	–	9	–	0
Villanova		–		2	–	9	–	0
Pittsburgh		–		1	–	10	–	0
Rankings from AP Poll

The 1972 Villanova Wildcats football team represented the Villanova University during the 1972 NCAA University Division football season. The head coach was Lou Ferry, coaching his third season with the Wildcats. The team played their home games at Villanova Stadium in Villanova, Pennsylvania.

== Schedule ==
Date	Time	Opponent	Site	Result	Attendance	Source
September 9		at West Virginia	Mountaineer Field; Morgantown, WV	L 6–25	33,500	
September 16	1:32 p.m.	at Kentucky	McLean Stadium; Lexington, KY	L 7–25	34,500	
September 23	1:32 p.m.	William & Mary*	Villanova Stadium; Villanova, PA	W 20–17	9,150	
September 30	8:00 p.m.	at Cincinnati	Nippert Stadium; Cincinnati, OH	L 7–14	5,681	
October 7	1:32 p.m.	Boston College	Villanova Stadium; Villanova, PA	L 20–21	11,500	
October 14	1:30 p.m.	at Maryland	Byrd Stadium; College Park, MD	L 7–37	26,842	
October 21		Quantico Marines	Villanova Stadium; Villanova, PA	L 7–13	8,810	
October 28	1:30 p.m.	at Holy Cross	Fitton Field; Worcester, MA	L 9–26	12,117	
November 4	1:30 p.m.	Delaware	Villanova Stadium; Villanova, PA (rivalry)	L 7–14	11,402	
November 11	1:31 p.m.	Xavier	Villanova Stadium; Villanova, PA	W 40–13	4,132–5,000	
November 18	1:33 p.m.	Temple	Villanova Stadium; Villanova, PA (Mayor's Cup)	L 10–12	12,631	
*Non-conference game; All times are in Eastern time

== Roster ==
1972 Villanova Wildcats football team roster
Players
Coaches
Offense

Pos.	#	Name	Class
QB	14	Tom Karczewski
OT	75	Joe Miller
WR	83	Bob Schaeffer
QB	6	Mike Sunday

Defense

Pos.	#	Name	Class
LB	46	Kevin Reilly

Special teams

Pos.	#	Name	Class

Head coach

- Lou Ferry

Coordinators/assistant coaches

Legend

- (C) Team captain
- (S) Suspended
- (I) Ineligible
- Injured
- Redshirt
