= 1973 Holy Cross Crusaders football team =

American college football season

1973 Holy Cross Crusaders football
- Conference: Independent
- Record: 5–6
- Head coach: Ed Doherty (3rd season)
- Captains: Tyree Blocker; Steve Buchanan
- Home stadium: Fitton Field

1973 NCAA Division I independents football records
	Conf.			Overall
Team	W	L	T	W		L		T
No. 1 Notre Dame		–		11	–	0	–	0
No. 5 Penn State		–		12	–	0	–	0
No. 9 Houston		–		11	–	1	–	0
Temple		–		9	–	1	–	0
No. 20 Tulane		–		9	–	3	–	0
Memphis State		–		8	–	3	–	0
Tampa		–		8	–	3	–	0
Boston College		–		7	–	4	–	0
South Carolina		–		7	–	4	–	0
Utah State		–		7	–	4	–	0
Air Force		–		6	–	4	–	0
Southern Miss		–		6	–	4	–	1
Northern Illinois		–		6	–	5	–	0
Rutgers		–		6	–	5	–	0
West Virginia		–		6	–	5	–	0
Pittsburgh		–		6	–	5	–	1
Colgate		–		5	–	5	–	0
Dayton		–		5	–	5	–	1
Xavier		–		5	–	5	–	1
Georgia Tech		–		5	–	6	–	0
Holy Cross		–		5	–	6	–	0
Miami (FL)		–		5	–	6	–	0
Cincinnati		–		4	–	7	–	0
Marshall		–		4	–	7	–	0
Navy		–		4	–	7	–	0
Southern Illinois		–		3	–	7	–	1
Villanova		–		3	–	8	–	0
Syracuse		–		2	–	9	–	0
Virginia Tech		–		2	–	9	–	0
Army		–		0	–	10	–	0
Florida State		–		0	–	11	–	0
Rankings from AP Poll

The 1973 Holy Cross Crusaders football team was an American football team that represented the College of the Holy Cross as an independent during the 1973 NCAA Division I football season. Ed Doherty returned for his third year as head coach. The team compiled a record of 5–6.

All home games were played at Fitton Field on the Holy Cross campus in Worcester, Massachusetts.

== Schedule ==
Date	Time	Opponent	Site	Result	Attendance	Source
September 8		at UMass	Alumni Stadium; Hadley, MA	W 30–28	18,100	
September 15		Northeastern	Fitton Field; Worcester, MA	W 38–14	14,500	
September 22		at New Hampshire	Cowell Stadium; Durham, NH	W 31–0	7,864–10,530	
September 29		Temple^{†}	Fitton Field; Worcester, MA	L 34–63	16,420	
October 6		at Dartmouth	Memorial Field; Hanover, NH	W 10–0	15,700	
October 13		Colgate	Fitton Field; Worcester, MA	L 21–22	15,721	
October 27	2:00 p.m.	at Army	Michie Stadium; West Point, NY	W 17–10	42,257–42,267	
November 10		Syracuse^	Fitton Field; Worcester, MA	L 3–5	16,404	
November 17		Rutgers	Fitton Field; Worcester, MA	L 7–27	14,881	
November 24		at Connecticut	Memorial Stadium; Storrs, CT	L 9–10	10,286	
December 1		at Boston College	Fitton Field; Worcester, MA (rivalry)	L 21–42	22,500	
^{†}Homecoming; ^ Family Weekend; All times are in Eastern time

== Statistical leaders ==
Statistical leaders for the 1973 Crusaders included:

- Rushing: Steve Buchanan, 849 yards and 4 touchdowns on 183 attempts
- Passing: Peter Vaas, 1,631 yards, 135 completions and 13 touchdowns on 258 attempts
- Receiving: Mark Sheridan, 703 yards and 5 touchdowns on 46 receptions
- Scoring: Steve Buchanan, 42 points from 7 touchdowns
- Total offense: Peter Vaas, 1,667 yards (1,631 passing, 36 rushing)
- All-purpose yards: Steve Buchanan, 1,023 yards (849 rushing, 174 receiving)
- Interceptions: John Provost, 8 interceptions for 138 yards
