= 1972 Pittsburgh Panthers football team =

American college football season

1972 Pittsburgh Panthers football
- Conference: Independent
- Record: 1–10
- Head coach: Carl DePasqua (4th season)
- Offensive coordinator: Lou Cecconi (4th season)
- Offensive scheme: Wishbone-T
- Defensive coordinator: Ralph Jelic (1st season)
- Base defense: 5–2
- Home stadium: Pitt Stadium

1972 NCAA University Division independents football records
	Conf.			Overall
Team	W	L	T	W		L		T
No. 10 Penn State		–		10	–	2	–	0
No. 14 Notre Dame		–		8	–	3	–	0
Utah State		–		8	–	3	–	0
West Virginia		–		8	–	4	–	0
Florida State		–		7	–	4	–	0
Northern Illinois		–		7	–	4	–	0
Rutgers		–		7	–	4	–	0
No. 20 Georgia Tech		–		7	–	4	–	1
Air Force		–		6	–	4	–	0
Army		–		6	–	4	–	0
Virginia Tech		–		6	–	4	–	1
Houston		–		6	–	4	–	1
Tulane		–		6	–	5	–	0
Temple		–		5	–	4	–	0
Colgate		–		5	–	4	–	1
Holy Cross		–		5	–	4	–	1
Syracuse		–		5	–	6	–	0
Miami (FL)		–		5	–	6	–	0
Dayton		–		4	–	6	–	1
Boston College		–		4	–	7	–	0
Navy		–		4	–	7	–	0
South Carolina		–		4	–	7	–	0
Southern Miss		–		3	–	7	–	1
Xavier		–		3	–	8	–	0
Marshall		–		2	–	8	–	0
Cincinnati		–		2	–	9	–	0
Villanova		–		2	–	9	–	0
Pittsburgh		–		1	–	10	–	0
Rankings from AP Poll

The 1972 Pittsburgh Panthers football team represented the University of Pittsburgh as an independent during the 1972 NCAA University Division football season. Led by Carl DePasqua in his fourth and final season as head coach, the Panthers compiled a record of 1–10. The team played home games at Pitt Stadium in Pittsburgh.

== Schedule ==
Date	Time	Opponent	Site	Result	Attendance	Source
September 9	1:30 p.m.	No. 19 Florida State	Pitt Stadium; Pittsburgh, PA	L 7–19	17,661	
September 16	1:30 p.m.	No. 8 UCLA	Pitt Stadium; Pittsburgh, PA	L 28–38	24,315	
September 23	3:30 p.m.	at Air Force	Falcon Stadium; Colorado Springs, CO	L 13–41	37,047	
September 30	1:30 p.m.	Northwestern	Pitt Stadium; Pittsburgh, PA	L 22–27	18,557	
October 7	8:30 p.m.	at Tulane	Tulane Stadium; New Orleans, LA	L 6–38	20,417	
October 14	1:30 p.m.	at No. 7 Notre Dame	Notre Dame Stadium; Notre Dame, IN (rivalry)	L 16–42	59,075	
October 21	1:30 p.m.	Boston College	Pitt Stadium; Pittsburgh, PA	W 35–20	18,116	
October 28	1:30 p.m.	at Syracuse	Archbold Stadium; Syracuse, NY (rivalry)	L 6–10	21,348	
November 4	1:30 p.m.	West Virginia^{†}	Pitt Stadium; Pittsburgh, PA (Backyard Brawl)	L 20–38	40,286	
November 11	1:30 p.m.	at Navy	Navy–Marine Corps Memorial Stadium; Annapolis, MD	L 13–28	21,244	
November 25	1:30 p.m.	at No. 6 Penn State	Beaver Stadium; University Park, PA (rivalry)	L 27–49	38,600	
^{†}Homecoming; Rankings from AP Poll released prior to the game; All times are in Eastern time

== Coaching staff ==
1972 Pittsburgh Panthers football staff
Coaching staff: Carl DePasqua – Head coach; Ralph Jelic – Defensive coordinator; Lou Cecconi – Offensive coordinator

== Team players drafted into the NFL ==
Player	Position	Round	Pick	NFL club
Ernie Webster	Guard	12	311	Washington Redskins
John Moss	Linebacker	13	331	Detroit Lions
