= 1972 Rhode Island Rams football team =

American college football season

1972 Rhode Island Rams football
- Conference: Yankee Conference
- Record: 3–7 (0–5 Yankee)
- Head coach: Jack Gregory (3rd season)
- Home stadium: Meade Stadium

1972 Yankee Conference football standings
	Conf.					Overall
Team	W		L		T	W		L		T
UMass $	5	–	0	–	0	9	–	2	–	0
Connecticut	4	–	1	–	0	4	–	5	–	0
Vermont	3	–	2	–	0	4	–	5	–	0
New Hampshire	2	–	3	–	0	4	–	5	–	0
Maine	1	–	4	–	0	3	–	6	–	0
Rhode Island	0	–	5	–	0	3	–	7	–	0
$ – Conference champion

The 1972 Rhode Island Rams football team was an American football team that represented the University of Rhode Island as a member of the Yankee Conference during the 1972 NCAA College Division football season. In its third season under head coach Jack Gregory, the team compiled a 3–7 record (0–5 against conference opponents), finished in sixth/last place in the Yankee Conference, and was outscored by a total of 199 to 146. The team played its home games at Meade Stadium in Kingston, Rhode Island.

== Schedule ==
Date	Opponent	Site	Result	Attendance	Source
September 10	Hampton*	Meade Stadium; Kingston, RI	W 27–0	9,000	
September 23	Northeastern*	Meade Stadium; Kingston, RI	W 27–7	4,600	
September 30	at Brown*	Brown Stadium; Providence, RI (rivalry)	W 21–17	9,000	
October 7	at Maine	Alumni Field; Orono, ME	L 7–10	6,300–7,000	
October 14	Vermont	Meade Stadium; Kingston, RI	L 13–14	5,857	
October 21	UMass	Meade Stadium; Kingston, RI	L 7–42	4,621–5,857	
October 28	at Boston University*	Nickerson Field; Boston, MA	L 13–31	1,000–5,510	
November 4	at New Hampshire	Cowell Stadium; Durham, NH	L 10–14	9,500–9,513	
November 11	at Temple*	Temple Stadium; Philadelphia, PA	L 0–22	5,000	
November 18	at Connecticut	Memorial Stadium; Storrs, CT (rivalry)	L 21–42	14,250–15,000	
*Non-conference game
