= 1972 South Carolina Gamecocks football team =

American college football season

1972 South Carolina Gamecocks football
- Conference: Independent
- Record: 4–7
- Head coach: Paul Dietzel (7th season)
- Captain: Rick Brown
- Home stadium: Williams–Brice Stadium

1972 NCAA University Division independents football records
	Conf.			Overall
Team	W	L	T	W		L		T
No. 10 Penn State		–		10	–	2	–	0
No. 14 Notre Dame		–		8	–	3	–	0
Utah State		–		8	–	3	–	0
West Virginia		–		8	–	4	–	0
Florida State		–		7	–	4	–	0
Northern Illinois		–		7	–	4	–	0
Rutgers		–		7	–	4	–	0
No. 20 Georgia Tech		–		7	–	4	–	1
Air Force		–		6	–	4	–	0
Army		–		6	–	4	–	0
Virginia Tech		–		6	–	4	–	1
Houston		–		6	–	4	–	1
Tulane		–		6	–	5	–	0
Temple		–		5	–	4	–	0
Colgate		–		5	–	4	–	1
Holy Cross		–		5	–	4	–	1
Syracuse		–		5	–	6	–	0
Miami (FL)		–		5	–	6	–	0
Dayton		–		4	–	6	–	1
Boston College		–		4	–	7	–	0
Navy		–		4	–	7	–	0
South Carolina		–		4	–	7	–	0
Southern Miss		–		3	–	7	–	1
Xavier		–		3	–	8	–	0
Marshall		–		2	–	8	–	0
Cincinnati		–		2	–	9	–	0
Villanova		–		2	–	9	–	0
Pittsburgh		–		1	–	10	–	0
Rankings from AP Poll

The 1972 South Carolina Gamecocks football team represented the University of South Carolina as an independent in the 1972 NCAA University Division football season. Led by seventh-year head coach Paul Dietzel, the Gamecocks compiled a record of 4–7. The team played home games at Williams–Brice Stadium in Columbia, South Carolina.

The Gamecocks did not play ACC members Duke, Maryland and North Carolina. The Tar Heels dropped South Carolina from their 1971 schedule, but the Blue Devils and Terrapins honored their contracts.

South Carolina's home stadium was officially renamed from Carolina Stadium to Williams–Brice Stadium in dedication ceremonies during the season-opening game against Virginia on September 9, 1972.

== Schedule ==
Date	Time	Opponent	Site	Result	Attendance	Source
September 9		Virginia	Williams–Brice Stadium; Columbia, SC	L 16–24	43,695	
September 16		at Georgia Tech	Grant Field; Atlanta, GA	L 6–34	48,224	
September 30		No. 20 Ole Miss	Williams–Brice Stadium; Columbia, SC	L 0–21	48,405	
September 30		Memphis State	Williams–Brice Stadium; Columbia, SC	W 34–7	37,893	
October 14		Appalachian State	Williams–Brice Stadium; Columbia, SC	W 41–7	36,836	
October 21	7:31 p.m.	Miami (OH)	Williams–Brice Stadium; Columbia, SC	L 8–21	40,351	
October 28		at NC State	Carter Stadium; Raleigh, NC	L 24–42	32,200	
November 4		Wake Forest	Williams–Brice Stadium; Columbia, SC	W 35–3	38,689	
November 11		at Virginia Tech	Lane Stadium; Blacksburg, VA	L 20–45	30,000	
November 18		Florida State	Williams–Brice Stadium; Columbia, SC	W 24–21	35,585	
November 25		at Clemson	Memorial Stadium; Clemson, SC (rivalry)	L 6–7	51,608	
Rankings from AP Poll released prior to the game; All times are in Eastern time
