= 1973 Rhode Island Rams football team =

American college football season

1973 Rhode Island Rams football
- Conference: Yankee Conference
- Record: 6–2–2 (4–1–1 Yankee)
- Head coach: Jack Gregory (4th season)
- Home stadium: Meade Stadium

1973 Yankee Conference football standings
	Conf.					Overall
Team	W		L		T	W		L		T
Connecticut $	5	–	0	–	1	8	–	2	–	1
Rhode Island	4	–	1	–	1	6	–	2	–	2
UMass	4	–	2	–	0	6	–	5	–	0
New Hampshire	2	–	3	–	0	4	–	5	–	0
Boston University	2	–	3	–	0	3	–	7	–	0
Maine	2	–	4	–	0	3	–	7	–	0
Vermont	1	–	5	–	0	3	–	6	–	0
$ – Conference champion

The 1973 Rhode Island Rams football team was an American football team that represented the University of Rhode Island as a member of the Yankee Conference during the 1973 NCAA Division II football season. In its fourth season under head coach Jack Gregory, the team compiled an overall record of 6–2–2 with a mark of 4–1–1 against conference opponents, placed second out of seven teams in the Yankee Conference, and outscored opponents by a total of 213 to 177. The team played its home games at Meade Stadium in Kingston, Rhode Island.

== Schedule ==
Date	Opponent	Site	Result	Attendance	Source
September 22	at Northeastern*	Parsons Field; Brookline, MA	W 35–7	5,732	
September 29	at Brown*	Brown Stadium; Providence, RI (rivalry)	T 20–20	10,000–10,200	
October 6	Maine	Meade Stadium; Kingston, RI	L 7–20	5,000	
October 13	at Vermont	Centennial Field; Burlington, VT	W 15–14	7,432–7,500	
October 20	at UMass	Alumni Stadium; Hadley, MA	W 41–35	14,500	
October 27	Boston University	Meade Stadium; Kingston, RI	W 14–9	8,350	
November 3	at New Hampshire	Wildcat Stadium; Durham, NH	W 40–16	9,473	
November 10	at Temple*	Temple Stadium; Philadelphia, PA	L 0–43	10,940	
November 17	Connecticut	Meade Stadium; Kingston, RI (rivalry)	T 7–7	12,092	
November 22	vs. Air Force All Stars*	Rhein-Main Air Base; Frankfurt, Germany	W 34–6	16,000	
*Non-conference game
