= 1972 Southern Miss Golden Eagles football team =

American college football season

1972 Southern Miss Golden Eagles football
- Conference: Independent
- Record: 3–7–1
- Head coach: P. W. Underwood (4th season)
- Offensive coordinator: Fred O'Connor (1st season)
- Home stadium: Faulkner Field

1972 NCAA University Division independents football records
	Conf.			Overall
Team	W	L	T	W		L		T
No. 10 Penn State		–		10	–	2	–	0
No. 14 Notre Dame		–		8	–	3	–	0
Utah State		–		8	–	3	–	0
West Virginia		–		8	–	4	–	0
Florida State		–		7	–	4	–	0
Northern Illinois		–		7	–	4	–	0
Rutgers		–		7	–	4	–	0
No. 20 Georgia Tech		–		7	–	4	–	1
Air Force		–		6	–	4	–	0
Army		–		6	–	4	–	0
Virginia Tech		–		6	–	4	–	1
Houston		–		6	–	4	–	1
Tulane		–		6	–	5	–	0
Temple		–		5	–	4	–	0
Colgate		–		5	–	4	–	1
Holy Cross		–		5	–	4	–	1
Syracuse		–		5	–	6	–	0
Miami (FL)		–		5	–	6	–	0
Dayton		–		4	–	6	–	1
Boston College		–		4	–	7	–	0
Navy		–		4	–	7	–	0
South Carolina		–		4	–	7	–	0
Southern Miss		–		3	–	7	–	1
Xavier		–		3	–	8	–	0
Marshall		–		2	–	8	–	0
Cincinnati		–		2	–	9	–	0
Villanova		–		2	–	9	–	0
Pittsburgh		–		1	–	10	–	0
Rankings from AP Poll

The 1972 Southern Miss Golden Eagles football team was an American football team that represented the University of Southern Mississippi as an independent during the 1972 NCAA University Division football season. In their fourth year under head coach P. W. Underwood, the team compiled a 3–7–1 record.

At their homecoming game on November 11 against Chattanooga, the University officially announced the athletic teams would be known as the Golden Eagles moving forward and retired the Southerners nickname.

== Schedule ==
Date	Time	Opponent	Site	Result	Attendance	Source
September 9		UT Arlington	Faulkner Field; Hattiesburg, MS	W 38–17	12,500	
September 16		Louisiana Tech	Faulkner Field; Hattiesburg, MS (rivalry)	L 14–33	11,600	
September 30		at No. 17 Ole Miss	Hemingway Stadium; Oxford, MS	L 9–13	27,200	
October 7	7:33 p.m.	West Texas State	Faulkner Field; Hattiesburg, MS	W 14–7	11,500	
October 14		at Richmond	City Stadium; Richmond, VA	W 34–9	2,500	
October 21		at Mississippi State	Scott Field; Starkville, MS	L 7–26	26,000	
October 28		at No. 2 Alabama	Legion Field; Birmingham, AL	L 11–48	57,090	
November 4		at Virginia Tech	Lane Stadium; Blacksburg, VA	L 14–27	25,000	
November 11		Chattanooga^{†}	Faulkner Field; Hattiesburg, MS	L 6–10	14,200	
November 18		at Utah State	Romney Stadium; Logan, UT	L 21–27	8,805	
December 2		Memphis State	Mississippi Veterans Memorial Stadium; Jackson, MS (rivalry)	T 14–14	15,000	
^{†}Homecoming; Rankings from AP Poll released prior to the game; All times are in Central time
