= 1972 UMass Minutemen football team =

American college football season

1972 UMass Minutemen football

Yankee Conference champion Boardwalk Bowl champion

Boardwalk Bowl, W 35–14 vs. UC Davis
- Conference: Yankee Conference
- Record: 9–2 (5–0 Yankee)
- Head coach: Dick MacPherson (2nd season)
- Home stadium: Alumni Stadium

1972 Yankee Conference football standings
	Conf.					Overall
Team	W		L		T	W		L		T
UMass $	5	–	0	–	0	9	–	2	–	0
Connecticut	4	–	1	–	0	4	–	5	–	0
Vermont	3	–	2	–	0	4	–	5	–	0
New Hampshire	2	–	3	–	0	4	–	5	–	0
Maine	1	–	4	–	0	3	–	6	–	0
Rhode Island	0	–	5	–	0	3	–	7	–	0
$ – Conference champion

The 1972 UMass Minutemen football team represented the University of Massachusetts Amherst in the 1972 NCAA College Division football season as a member of the Yankee Conference. The team was coached by Dick MacPherson and played its home games at Alumni Stadium in Hadley, Massachusetts. The 1972 season was the first in which Massachusetts was named the "Minutemen," as the university had changed their nickname from the "Redmen" due to changing attitudes regarding the use of Native American-themed mascots in sports. It was also the last season of the NCAA's University and College Division setup, as they would split athletics into three numbered divisions in 1973, with UMass moving into Division II. Massachusetts performed strongly enough in the regular season to earn a spot in the 1972 Boardwalk Bowl, which at the time served as the NCAA College Division East championship game. The team defeated UC Davis by a score of 35–14 and finished the season with a record of 9–2 overall and 5–0 in conference play.

== Schedule ==
Date	Time	Opponent	Rank	Site	Result	Attendance	Source
September 23		Maine		Alumni Stadium; Hadley, MA	W 37–0	8,500–9,500	
September 30		at Harvard*		Harvard Stadium; Boston, MA	W 28–19	13,000–13,500	
October 7		at Vermont		Centennial Field; Burlington, VT	W 33–14	4,700	
October 14		Boston University*		Alumni Stadium; Hadley, MA	W 44–15	12,500	
October 21		at Rhode Island		Meade Stadium; Kingston, RI	W 42–7	4,621–5,857	
October 28		Connecticut		Alumni Stadium; Hadley, MA (rivalry)	W 49–16	17,500	
November 4		at Bucknell*	No. 10	Christy Mathewson–Memorial Stadium; Lewisburg, PA	L 15–28	6,800	
November 11		at Holy Cross*		Fitton Field; Worcester, MA	L 16–28	16,321–16,700	
November 18		New Hampshire		Alumni Stadium; Hadley, MA (rivalry)	W 42–7	11,700	
November 25		Boston College*		Alumni Stadium; Hadley, MA (rivalry)	W 28–7	20,000	
December 9	2:00 p.m.	vs. UC Davis*		Atlantic City Convention Center; Atlantic City, NJ (Boardwalk Bowl)	W 35–14	2,857	
*Non-conference game; Rankings from AP Poll released prior to the game; All times are in Eastern time
