= 1972 Syracuse Orangemen football team =

American college football season

1972 Syracuse Orangemen football
- Conference: Independent
- Record: 5–6
- Head coach: Ben Schwartzwalder (24th season)
- Captain: Game captains
- Home stadium: Archbold Stadium

1972 NCAA University Division independents football records
	Conf.			Overall
Team	W	L	T	W		L		T
No. 10 Penn State		–		10	–	2	–	0
No. 14 Notre Dame		–		8	–	3	–	0
Utah State		–		8	–	3	–	0
West Virginia		–		8	–	4	–	0
Florida State		–		7	–	4	–	0
Northern Illinois		–		7	–	4	–	0
Rutgers		–		7	–	4	–	0
No. 20 Georgia Tech		–		7	–	4	–	1
Air Force		–		6	–	4	–	0
Army		–		6	–	4	–	0
Virginia Tech		–		6	–	4	–	1
Houston		–		6	–	4	–	1
Tulane		–		6	–	5	–	0
Temple		–		5	–	4	–	0
Colgate		–		5	–	4	–	1
Holy Cross		–		5	–	4	–	1
Syracuse		–		5	–	6	–	0
Miami (FL)		–		5	–	6	–	0
Dayton		–		4	–	6	–	1
Boston College		–		4	–	7	–	0
Navy		–		4	–	7	–	0
South Carolina		–		4	–	7	–	0
Southern Miss		–		3	–	7	–	1
Xavier		–		3	–	8	–	0
Marshall		–		2	–	8	–	0
Cincinnati		–		2	–	9	–	0
Villanova		–		2	–	9	–	0
Pittsburgh		–		1	–	10	–	0
Rankings from AP Poll

The 1972 Syracuse Orangemen football team represented Syracuse University as an independent during the 1972 NCAA University Division football season. The team was led by 24th-year head coach Ben Schwartzwalder and played their home games at Archbold Stadium in Syracuse, New York. The team finished with a record of 5–6.

== Schedule ==
Date	Time	Opponent	Site	Result	Attendance	Source
September 9		Temple	Archbold Stadium; Syracuse, NY	W 17–10	21,062	
September 16		at NC State	Carter Stadium; Raleigh, NC	L 20–43	27,100	
September 23		at Wisconsin	Camp Randall Stadium; Madison, WI	L 7–31	67,234	
September 30		Maryland	Archbold Stadium; Syracuse, NY	W 16–12	15,681	
October 7		Indiana	Archbold Stadium; Syracuse, NY	L 2–10	18,444	
October 14	1:30 p.m.	Navy	Archbold Stadium; Syracuse, NY	W 30–14	22,187	
October 21		at No. 12 Penn State	Beaver Stadium; University Park, PA (rivalry)	L 0–17	60,465	
October 28		Pittsburgh	Archbold Stadium; Syracuse, NY (rivalry)	W 10–6	21,348	
November 4		at Boston College	Alumni Stadium; Chestnut Hill, MA	L 0–37	21,216	
November 11		Army	Archbold Stadium; Syracuse, NY	W 27–6	19,525	
November 18		at West Virginia	Mountaineer Field; Morgantown, WV (rivalry)	L 12–43	31,500	
Rankings from AP Poll released prior to the game; All times are in Eastern time
