= 1972 Florida State Seminoles football team =

American college football season

1972 Florida State Seminoles football
- Conference: Independent
- Record: 7–4
- Head coach: Larry Jones (2nd season)
- Captains: Gary Huff; Larry Strickland
- Home stadium: Doak Campbell Stadium

1972 NCAA University Division independents football records
	Conf.			Overall
Team	W	L	T	W		L		T
No. 10 Penn State		–		10	–	2	–	0
No. 14 Notre Dame		–		8	–	3	–	0
Utah State		–		8	–	3	–	0
West Virginia		–		8	–	4	–	0
Florida State		–		7	–	4	–	0
Northern Illinois		–		7	–	4	–	0
Rutgers		–		7	–	4	–	0
No. 20 Georgia Tech		–		7	–	4	–	1
Air Force		–		6	–	4	–	0
Army		–		6	–	4	–	0
Virginia Tech		–		6	–	4	–	1
Houston		–		6	–	4	–	1
Tulane		–		6	–	5	–	0
Temple		–		5	–	4	–	0
Colgate		–		5	–	4	–	1
Holy Cross		–		5	–	4	–	1
Syracuse		–		5	–	6	–	0
Miami (FL)		–		5	–	6	–	0
Dayton		–		4	–	6	–	1
Boston College		–		4	–	7	–	0
Navy		–		4	–	7	–	0
South Carolina		–		4	–	7	–	0
Southern Miss		–		3	–	7	–	1
Xavier		–		3	–	8	–	0
Marshall		–		2	–	8	–	0
Cincinnati		–		2	–	9	–	0
Villanova		–		2	–	9	–	0
Pittsburgh		–		1	–	10	–	0
Rankings from AP Poll

The 1972 Florida State Seminoles football team represented Florida State University as an independent during the 1972 NCAA University Division football season. The Seminoles began the season ranked #19 in the AP poll and rose to #13 (#20, #17, #16, #13 in the second through fifth weeks respectively) before falling out completely following their loss to Florida. They entered again at #17 after their victory against Colorado State, but dropped out again after the loss at Auburn.

== Schedule ==
Date	Time	Opponent	Rank	Site	Result	Attendance	Source
September 9		at Pittsburgh	No. 19	Pitt Stadium; Pittsburgh, PA	W 19–7	17,661	
September 16	7:33 p.m.	at Miami (FL)	No. 20	Miami Orange Bowl; Miami, FL (rivalry)	W 37–14	35,421	
September 23		Virginia Tech	No. 17	Doak Campbell Stadium; Tallahassee, FL	W 27–15	36,400	
September 30		at Kansas	No. 16	Memorial Stadium; Lawrence, KS	W 44–22	41,500	
October 7		Florida	No. 13	Doak Campbell Stadium; Tallahassee, FL (rivalry)	L 13–42	43,758	
October 14		at Mississippi State		Mississippi Veterans Memorial Stadium; Jackson, MS	W 25–21	30,000	
October 21		Colorado State		Doak Campbell Stadium; Tallahassee, FL	W 37–0	31,327	
October 28		at No. 12 Auburn	No. 17	Cliff Hare Stadium; Auburn, AL	L 14–27	58,122	
November 4		Houston		Doak Campbell Stadium; Tallahassee, FL	L 27–31	29,482	
November 11		Tulsa		Doak Campbell Stadium; Tallahassee, FL	W 23–21	24,016	
November 18		at South Carolina		Williams–Brice Stadium; Columbia, SC	L 21–24	35,585	
Rankings from AP Poll released prior to the game; All times are in Eastern time

== Roster ==
- QB #19 Gary Huff, Sr.
- TE Dick Hopkins, redshirt So.
