= Carl Falivene =

American football player and coach (1927–2015)

Biographical details
- Born: August 16, 1927; Schenectady, New York, U.S.
- Died: September 28, 2015 (aged 88); The Woodlands, Texas, U.S.

Playing career
- 1947: Notre Dame
- 1948–1949: Syracuse
- Positions: Fullback, linebacker

Coaching career (HC unless noted)
- 1951: St. Anne's Academy (AR)
- 1966–1967: Hofstra (assistant)
- 1968–1970: Williams (assistant)
- 1971: Vermont (assistant)
- 1972–1974: Vermont

Carl James Falivene Sr. (August 16, 1927 – September 28, 2015) was an American football player and coach. He served as the last-to-date varsity head football coach at the University of Vermont in Burlington, Vermont from 1972 until the program was shuttered in 1974.

As a college football player, he played for a short period at Notre Dame under Hall of Fame head coach Frank Leahy until injuries derailed his career there. He transferred to Syracuse University where he was a standout fullback and linebacker.

== Head coaching record ==
Year	Team	Overall	Conference	Standing	Bowl/playoffs
Vermont Catamounts (Yankee Conference) (1972–1974)
1972	Vermont	4–5	3–2	3rd	
1973	Vermont	3–6	1–5	7th	
1974	Vermont	4–6	1–5	7th	
Vermont:		11–17	5–12		
Total:		11–17			
