= Walter Abbott (American football) =

American football player & coach (born 1936/37)

Biographical details
- Born: 1936 or 1937 (age 89–90); Rumford, Maine, U.S.

Playing career
- 1955–1957: Maine
- Positions: Guard, linebacker

Coaching career (HC unless noted)
- 1960–1966: Maine (assistant)
- 1967–1975: Maine

Administrative career (AD unless noted)
- 1991–1992: Maine (interim AD)
- 1994–1995: Maine (interim AD)

Head coaching record
- Overall: 27–53

Accomplishments and honors

Championships
- 1 Yankee (1974)

Walter H. Abbott (born 1936 or 1937) is an American former football player and coach, college athletics administrator, and university professor. He served as the head football coach at the University of Maine from 1967 through 1975, compiling a record of a 27–53. His Maine Black Bears football team won a share of Yankee Conference championship in 1974. Abbott served two stints as interim athletic director at Maine, from 1991 to 1992 and again from 1994 to 1995, and was the coordinator of the football program in 1986 between the departure of Ron Rogerson and hiring of Buddy Teevens. He also was a member of the university's faculty until his retirement in 2010. Abbott is well known for creating and instructing the popular Outdoor Leadership (formerly Preparedness) course in which he introduced thousands of students to the beauty, ruggedness and adventure to be found in the state of Maine.

His son, Steve Abbott, served as the Chief of Staff to Senator Susan Collins and as interim athletic director at the University of Maine.

== Head coaching record ==
Year	Team	Overall	Conference	Standing	Bowl/playoffs
Maine Black Bears (Yankee Conference) (1967–1975)
1967	Maine	0–8	0–5	6th	
1968	Maine	3–5	2–3	T–3rd	
1969	Maine	5–4	3–2	T–2nd	
1970	Maine	3–5	1–4	5th	
1971	Maine	2–6	1–4	6th	
1972	Maine	3–6	1–4	5th	
1973	Maine	3–7	2–4	5th	
1974	Maine	4–6	4–2	T–1st	
1975	Maine	4–6	1–4	T–4th	
Maine:		27–53	15–32		
Total:		27–53			
National championship Conference title Conference division title or championship game berth
