= 1972 Holy Cross Crusaders football team =

American college football season

1972 Holy Cross Crusaders football
- Conference: Independent
- Record: 5–4–1
- Head coach: Ed Doherty (2nd season)
- Captains: Joe MarcAurele; Joe Wilson
- Home stadium: Fitton Field

1972 NCAA University Division independents football records
	Conf.			Overall
Team	W	L	T	W		L		T
No. 10 Penn State		–		10	–	2	–	0
No. 14 Notre Dame		–		8	–	3	–	0
Utah State		–		8	–	3	–	0
West Virginia		–		8	–	4	–	0
Florida State		–		7	–	4	–	0
Northern Illinois		–		7	–	4	–	0
Rutgers		–		7	–	4	–	0
No. 20 Georgia Tech		–		7	–	4	–	1
Air Force		–		6	–	4	–	0
Army		–		6	–	4	–	0
Virginia Tech		–		6	–	4	–	1
Houston		–		6	–	4	–	1
Tulane		–		6	–	5	–	0
Temple		–		5	–	4	–	0
Colgate		–		5	–	4	–	1
Holy Cross		–		5	–	4	–	1
Syracuse		–		5	–	6	–	0
Miami (FL)		–		5	–	6	–	0
Dayton		–		4	–	6	–	1
Boston College		–		4	–	7	–	0
Navy		–		4	–	7	–	0
South Carolina		–		4	–	7	–	0
Southern Miss		–		3	–	7	–	1
Xavier		–		3	–	8	–	0
Marshall		–		2	–	8	–	0
Cincinnati		–		2	–	9	–	0
Villanova		–		2	–	9	–	0
Pittsburgh		–		1	–	10	–	0
Rankings from AP Poll

The 1972 Holy Cross Crusaders football team was an American football team that represented the College of the Holy Cross during the 1972 NCAA University Division football season. Ed Doherty returned for his second year as head coach. The team compiled a record of 5–4–1.

Holy Cross competed as an independent despite having joined the Yankee Conference in 1971. Because their previous scheduling commitments for the 1972 season would not have allowed them to play the full Yankee round-robin, the Crusaders were excluded from the Yankee Conference football championship. Nonetheless, Holy Cross coaches participated in the conference's preseason media night, expressing their enthusiasm about full participation in league play in the coming years.

Three months later, college officials had a different view of the future. Having made the decision to admit women to what had formerly been an all-male college, administrators worried that soon there would not be enough men on campus to stay competitive in the full range of Yankee Conference sports. On November 14, with the football season still in progress, they made the announcement that Holy Cross would withdraw from the Yankee Conference, effective immediately.

As in 1971, Holy Cross played two longstanding Yankee Conference opponents in 1972, beating Massachusetts days before the withdrawal announcement, and Connecticut a couple weeks after. Neither game was considered a conference matchup.

All home games were played at Fitton Field on the Holy Cross campus in Worcester, Massachusetts.

== Schedule ==
Date	Time	Opponent	Site	Result	Attendance	Source
September 16		Rutgers	Fitton Field; Worcester, MA	W 24–14	15,520	
September 23		at Brown	Brown Stadium; Providence, RI	W 30–24	12,500	
September 30		at Temple	Temple Stadium; Philadelphia, PA	L 7–15	9,810	
October 7		Dartmouth^{†}	Fitton Field; Worcester, MA	L 7–17	8,000	
October 14		at Colgate	Andy Kerr Stadium; Hamilton, NY	T 21–21	7,500	
October 28	1:30 p.m.	Villanova^	Fitton Field; Worcester, MA	W 26–9	12,117	
November 11		UMass	Fitton Field; Worcester, MA	W 28–16	16,321–16,700	
November 18	1:30 p.m.	at Army	Michie Stadium; West Point, NY	L 13–15	39,441	
November 25		Connecticut	Fitton Field; Worcester, MA	W 20–10	14,011	
December 2		at Boston College	Alumni Stadium; Chestnut Hill, MA (rivalry)	L 11–41	30,187	
^{†}Homecoming; ^ Family Weekend; All times are in Eastern time

== Statistical leaders ==
Statistical leaders for the 1972 Crusaders included:

- Rushing: Joe Wilson, 885 yards and 7 touchdowns on 183 attempts
- Passing: Peter Vaas, 637 yards, 47 completions and 5 touchdowns on 111 attempts
- Receiving: Joe Neary, 251 yards and 1 touchdown on 20 receptions
- Scoring: Joe Wilson, 48 points from 8 touchdowns
- Total offense: Joe Wilson, 885 yards (all rushing)
- All-purpose yards: Joe Wilson, 975 yards (885 rushing, 90 receiving)
- Interceptions: John Provost, 9 interceptions for 175 yards
