= 1973 Bucknell Bison football team =

American college football season

1973 Bucknell Bison football
- Conference: Independent
- Record: 3–4–2
- Head coach: Fred Prender (5th season)
- Captains: John Dailey; Carl Probst
- Home stadium: Memorial Stadium

1973 NCAA Division II independents football records
	Conf.			Overall
Team	W	L	T	W		L		T
No. 1 Tennessee State		–		10	–	0	–	0
No. 9 Hawaii		–		9	–	2	–	0
Nebraska–Omaha		–		7	–	2	–	1
Trinity (TX)		–		8	–	3	–	0
UNLV		–		8	–	3	–	0
No. 13 Delaware ^		–		8	–	4	–	0
Western Carolina		–		6	–	3	–	1
Central Michigan		–		7	–	4	–	0
Nevada		–		7	–	4	–	0
Western Illinois		–		7	–	4	–	0
Milwaukee		–		6	–	4	–	1
Eastern Michigan		–		6	–	4	–	0
American International		–		5	–	4	–	0
Akron		–		6	–	5	–	0
Central State (OH)		–		6	–	5	–	0
Ball State		–		5	–	5	–	1
Wayne State (MI)		–		5	–	5	–	0
Drexel		–		4	–	4	–	0
Bucknell		–		3	–	4	–	2
Northeast Louisiana		–		3	–	5	–	2
Santa Clara		–		4	–	6	–	0
Youngstown State		–		4	–	6	–	0
Arkansas–Pine Bluff		–		3	–	5	–	1
Chattanooga		–		4	–	7	–	0
Indiana State		–		4	–	7	–	0
Northeastern		–		3	–	6	–	0
Kentucky State		–		3	–	8	–	0
Northern Michigan		–		2	–	7	–	1
Eastern Illinois		–		2	–	9	–	0
Portland State		–		1	–	10	–	0
^ – NCAA Division II playoff participant; Rankings from AP small college poll

The 1973 Bucknell Bison football team was an American football team that represented Bucknell University as an independent during the 1973 NCAA Division II football season.

In their fifth year under head coach Fred Prender, the Bison compiled a 3–4–2 record. John Dailey and Carl Probst were the team captains.

Bucknell played its home games at Memorial Stadium on the university campus in Lewisburg, Pennsylvania.

== Schedule ==
Date	Opponent	Site	Result	Attendance	Source
September 22	Boston University	Memorial Stadium; Lewisburg, PA	W 24–6	6,500	
September 29	at Columbia	Baker Field; New York, NY	T 0–0	4,837	
October 6	at Gettysburg	Musselman Stadium; Gettysburg, PA	W 45–7	4,800	
October 13	Lehigh^{†}	Memorial Stadium; Lewisburg, PA	L 15–42	12,000	
October 20	at Lafayette	Fisher Field; Easton, PA	T 0–0	10,000	
October 27	at Colgate	Andy Kerr Stadium; Hamilton, NY	L 23–41	6,000	
November 3	at Maine	Alumni Stadium; Orono, ME	L 0–14	1,800–2,000	
November 10	Vermont^	Memorial Stadium; Lewisburg, PA	W 26–7	7,500	
November 17	Delaware	Memorial Stadium; Lewisburg, PA	L 0–50	8,500	
^{†}Homecoming; ^ Parents Weekend
