= 1972 Houston Cougars football team =

American college football season

1972 Houston Cougars football
- Conference: Independent
- Record: 6–4–1
- Head coach: Bill Yeoman (11th season)
- Offensive scheme: Veer–T
- Defensive coordinator: Don Todd (1st season)
- Captains: Puddin Jones; Randy Peacock; David Bourquin
- Home stadium: Houston Astrodome

1972 NCAA University Division independents football records
	Conf.			Overall
Team	W	L	T	W		L		T
No. 10 Penn State		–		10	–	2	–	0
No. 14 Notre Dame		–		8	–	3	–	0
Utah State		–		8	–	3	–	0
West Virginia		–		8	–	4	–	0
Florida State		–		7	–	4	–	0
Northern Illinois		–		7	–	4	–	0
Rutgers		–		7	–	4	–	0
No. 20 Georgia Tech		–		7	–	4	–	1
Air Force		–		6	–	4	–	0
Army		–		6	–	4	–	0
Virginia Tech		–		6	–	4	–	1
Houston		–		6	–	4	–	1
Tulane		–		6	–	5	–	0
Temple		–		5	–	4	–	0
Colgate		–		5	–	4	–	1
Holy Cross		–		5	–	4	–	1
Syracuse		–		5	–	6	–	0
Miami (FL)		–		5	–	6	–	0
Dayton		–		4	–	6	–	1
Boston College		–		4	–	7	–	0
Navy		–		4	–	7	–	0
South Carolina		–		4	–	7	–	0
Southern Miss		–		3	–	7	–	1
Xavier		–		3	–	8	–	0
Marshall		–		2	–	8	–	0
Cincinnati		–		2	–	9	–	0
Villanova		–		2	–	9	–	0
Pittsburgh		–		1	–	10	–	0
Rankings from AP Poll

The 1972 Houston Cougars football team represented the University of Houston as an independent during the 1972 NCAA University Division football season. Led by 11th-year head coach Bill Yeoman, the Cougars compiled a record of 6–4–1.

== Schedule ==
Date	Time	Opponent	Site	TV	Result	Attendance	Source
September 9		at Rice	Rice Stadium; Houston, TX (rivalry)		L 13–14	51,000	
September 16		No. 13 Arizona State	Houston Astrodome; Houston, TX	ABC	L 28–33	24,628	
September 23		at Tulsa	Skelly Stadium; Tulsa, OK		W 21–0	23,200	
October 7		at Virginia Tech	Lane Stadium; Blacksburg, VA		T 27–27	26,000	
October 14		San Diego State	Houston Astrodome; Houston, TX		W 49–14	29,891	
October 21	6:31 p.m.	at Miami (FL)	Miami Orange Bowl; Miami, FL		L 13–33	17,860	
October 28		at Mississippi State	Scott Field; Starkville, MS		L 13–27	29,000	
November 4		at Florida State	Doak Campbell Stadium; Tallahassee, FL		W 31–27	29,482	
November 11		Colorado State^{†}	Houston Astrodome; Houston, TX		W 48–13	23,143	
November 18		New Mexico	Houston Astrodome; Houston, TX		W 33–14	20,366	
November 25	7:30 p.m.	Cincinnati	Houston Astrodome; Houston, TX		W 49–0	18,795	
^{†}Homecoming; Rankings from AP Poll released prior to the game; All times are in Central time

== Personnel ==
1972 Houston Cougars football team roster
Players			Coaches
Offense: Pos. / # / Name / Class	Defense: Pos. / # / Name / Class	Special teams: Pos. / # / Name / Class	Head coach: Bill Yeoman; Coordinators/assistant coaches Legend: (C) Team captain; (S) Suspended; (I) Ineligible; Injured; Redshirt
