= 1973 Connecticut Huskies football team =

American college football season

1973 Connecticut Huskies football

Yankee Conference champion
- Conference: Yankee Conference
- Record: 8–2–1 (5–0–1 Yankee)
- Head coach: Larry Naviaux (1st season)
- Home stadium: Memorial Stadium

1973 Yankee Conference football standings
	Conf.					Overall
Team	W		L		T	W		L		T
Connecticut $	5	–	0	–	1	8	–	2	–	1
Rhode Island	4	–	1	–	1	6	–	2	–	2
UMass	4	–	2	–	0	6	–	5	–	0
New Hampshire	2	–	3	–	0	4	–	5	–	0
Boston University	2	–	3	–	0	3	–	7	–	0
Maine	2	–	4	–	0	3	–	7	–	0
Vermont	1	–	5	–	0	3	–	6	–	0
$ – Conference champion

The 1973 Connecticut Huskies football team represented the University of Connecticut in the 1973 NCAA Division II football season. The Huskies were led by first-year head coach Larry Naviaux, and completed the season with a record of 8–2–1.

== Schedule ==
Date	Opponent	Site	Result	Attendance	Source
September 15	Lehigh*	Memorial Stadium; Storrs, CT	L 20–22	10,000–10,089	
September 22	at Vermont	Centennial Field; Burlington, VT	W 26–14	2,350–4,000	
September 29	at Yale*	Yale Bowl; New Haven, CT	W 27–13	16,714	
October 6	New Hampshire	Memorial Stadium; Storrs, CT	W 7–3	13,524–13,528	
October 13	at No. 1 Delaware*	Delaware Stadium; Newark, DE	L 7–35	20,751	
October 20	at Maine	Alumni Field; Orono, ME	W 30–3	2,000–4,000	
October 27	UMass	Memorial Stadium; Storrs, CT (rivalry)	W 28–6	15,551	
November 3	Rutgers*	Memorial Stadium; Storrs, CT	W 27–19	13,793	
November 10	at Boston University	Nickerson Field; Boston, MA	W 19–10	4,557	
November 17	at Rhode Island	Meade Stadium; Kingston, RI (rivalry)	T 7–7	12,092	
November 24	Holy Cross*	Memorial Stadium; Storrs, CT	W 10–9	10,286	
*Non-conference game; Rankings from AP Poll released prior to the game

== After the season ==
=== NFL draft ===
The following Husky was selected in the National Football League draft following the season.

Round	Pick	Player	Position	NFL club
11	272	Eric Torkelson	Running back	Green Bay Packers
