= 1973 New Hampshire Wildcats football team =

American college football season

1973 New Hampshire Wildcats football
- Conference: Yankee Conference
- Record: 4–5 (2–3 Yankee)
- Head coach: Bill Bowes (2nd season)
- Home stadium: Cowell Stadium

1973 Yankee Conference football standings
	Conf.					Overall
Team	W		L		T	W		L		T
Connecticut $	5	–	0	–	1	8	–	2	–	1
Rhode Island	4	–	1	–	1	6	–	2	–	2
UMass	4	–	2	–	0	6	–	5	–	0
New Hampshire	2	–	3	–	0	4	–	5	–	0
Boston University	2	–	3	–	0	3	–	7	–	0
Maine	2	–	4	–	0	3	–	7	–	0
Vermont	1	–	5	–	0	3	–	6	–	0
$ – Conference champion

The 1973 New Hampshire Wildcats football team was an American football team that represented the University of New Hampshire as a member of the Yankee Conference during the 1973 NCAA Division II football season. In its second year under head coach Bill Bowes, the team compiled a 4–5 record (2–3 against conference opponents) and tied for fourth place out of six teams in the Yankee Conference.

== Schedule ==
Date	Opponent	Site	Result	Attendance	Source
September 22	Holy Cross*	Cowell Stadium; Durham, NH	L 0–31	7,864–10,530	
September 29	Dartmouth*	Cowell Stadium; Durham, NH (rivalry)	W 10–9	11,723–11,733	
October 6	at Connecticut	Memorial Stadium; Storrs, CT	L 3–7	13,524–13,528	
October 13	at Maine	Alumni Field; Orono, ME (Battle for the Brice–Cowell Musket)	W 13–0	8,500	
October 20	Vermont	Cowell Stadium; Durham, NH	W 19–7	9,995	
October 27	Northeastern*	Cowell Stadium; Durham, NH	W 17–14	8,507	
November 3	Rhode Island	Cowell Stadium; Durham, NH	L 16–40	9,473	
November 10	at Springfield*	Benedum Field; Springfield, MA	L 0–51	1,700	
November 17	UMass	Cowell Stadium; Durham, NH (rivalry)	L 7–28	8,500–9,035	
*Non-conference game
