= 1973 Lehigh Engineers football team =

American college football season

1973 Lehigh Engineers football

Lambert Cup co-champion

NCAA Division II Quarterfinal, L 16-26 at Western Kentucky
- Conference: Independent
- Record: 7–4–1
- Head coach: Fred Dunlap (9th season)
- Offensive coordinator: John Whitehead (5th season)
- Captains: Roger McFillin; Kim McQuilken
- Home stadium: Taylor Stadium

1973 NCAA Division II independents football records
	Conf.			Overall
Team	W	L	T	W		L		T
No. 1 Tennessee State		–		10	–	0	–	0
No. 9 Hawaii		–		9	–	2	–	0
Nebraska–Omaha		–		7	–	2	–	1
Trinity (TX)		–		8	–	3	–	0
UNLV		–		8	–	3	–	0
No. 13 Delaware ^		–		8	–	4	–	0
Western Carolina		–		6	–	3	–	1
Central Michigan		–		7	–	4	–	0
Nevada		–		7	–	4	–	0
Western Illinois		–		7	–	4	–	0
Milwaukee		–		6	–	4	–	1
Eastern Michigan		–		6	–	4	–	0
American International		–		5	–	4	–	0
Akron		–		6	–	5	–	0
Central State (OH)		–		6	–	5	–	0
Ball State		–		5	–	5	–	1
Wayne State (MI)		–		5	–	5	–	0
Drexel		–		4	–	4	–	0
Bucknell		–		3	–	4	–	2
Northeast Louisiana		–		3	–	5	–	2
Santa Clara		–		4	–	6	–	0
Youngstown State		–		4	–	6	–	0
Arkansas–Pine Bluff		–		3	–	5	–	1
Chattanooga		–		4	–	7	–	0
Indiana State		–		4	–	7	–	0
Northeastern		–		3	–	6	–	0
Kentucky State		–		3	–	8	–	0
Northern Michigan		–		2	–	7	–	1
Eastern Illinois		–		2	–	9	–	0
Portland State		–		1	–	10	–	0
^ – NCAA Division II playoff participant; Rankings from AP small college poll

The 1973 Lehigh Engineers football team was an American football team that represented Lehigh University as an independent during the 1973 NCAA Division II football season. Lehigh lost in the quarterfinal round of the national playoffs, and won the Lambert Cup.

In their ninth year under head coach Fred Dunlap, the Engineers compiled a 7–4–1 record (7–3–1 in the regular season). Kim McQuilken and Roger McFillin were the team captains. McQuilken completed 62.5% of his passes for 2,603 yards and 19 touchdowns and was selected by the Associated Press as the first-team quarterback on the 1973 Little All-America college football team.

Although they did not appear at any point in the small college rankings, the Engineers earned a share of the Lambert Cup, awarded to the best team from a mid-sized college in the East. Lehigh shared the honor with Delaware, which had started the year ranked No. 1 and ended at No. 10.

Both Delaware and Lehigh also qualified for the first-ever NCAA Division II national playoff. Lehigh lost a road game to No. 2 Western Kentucky.

Lehigh played its home games at Taylor Stadium on the university campus in Bethlehem, Pennsylvania.

== Schedule ==
Date	Opponent	Site	Result	Attendance	Source
September 8	at Hofstra	Hofstra Stadium; Hempstead, NY	W 49–0	5,500	
September 15	at Connecticut	Memorial Stadium; Storrs, CT	W 22–20	10,000–10,089	
September 22	Rutgers	Taylor Stadium; Bethlehem, PA	L 13–31	12,000	
September 29	No. 1 Delaware	Taylor Stadium; Bethlehem, PA (rivalry)	L 9–21	14,500	
October 6	at Cornell	Schoellkopf Field; Ithaca, NY	T 7–7	14,000	
October 13	at Bucknell	Memorial Stadium; Lewisburg, PA	W 42–15	12,000	
October 19	at Penn	Franklin Field; Philadelphia, PA	L 20–27	15,500–17,800	
October 27	Gettysburg	Taylor Stadium; Bethlehem, PA	W 43–15	12,000	
November 3	Colgate	Taylor Stadium; Bethlehem, PA	W 58–26	12,000	
November 10	at Rochester	Fauver Stadium; Rochester, NY	W 42–0	2,500	
November 17	Lafayette	Taylor Stadium; Bethlehem, PA (The Rivalry)	W 45–13	18,000	
December 1	at No. 2 Western Kentucky	L.T. Smith Stadium; Bowling Green, KY (NCAA Division II Quarterfinal)	L 16–26	12,500	
Rankings from AP Poll released prior to the game
