= 1972 Virginia Tech Gobblers football team =

American college football season

1972 Virginia Tech Gobblers football
- Conference: Independent
- Record: 6–4–1
- Head coach: Charlie Coffey (2nd season)
- Home stadium: Lane Stadium

1972 NCAA University Division independents football records
	Conf.			Overall
Team	W	L	T	W		L		T
No. 10 Penn State		–		10	–	2	–	0
No. 14 Notre Dame		–		8	–	3	–	0
Utah State		–		8	–	3	–	0
West Virginia		–		8	–	4	–	0
Florida State		–		7	–	4	–	0
Northern Illinois		–		7	–	4	–	0
Rutgers		–		7	–	4	–	0
No. 20 Georgia Tech		–		7	–	4	–	1
Air Force		–		6	–	4	–	0
Army		–		6	–	4	–	0
Virginia Tech		–		6	–	4	–	1
Houston		–		6	–	4	–	1
Tulane		–		6	–	5	–	0
Temple		–		5	–	4	–	0
Colgate		–		5	–	4	–	1
Holy Cross		–		5	–	4	–	1
Syracuse		–		5	–	6	–	0
Miami (FL)		–		5	–	6	–	0
Dayton		–		4	–	6	–	1
Boston College		–		4	–	7	–	0
Navy		–		4	–	7	–	0
South Carolina		–		4	–	7	–	0
Southern Miss		–		3	–	7	–	1
Xavier		–		3	–	8	–	0
Marshall		–		2	–	8	–	0
Cincinnati		–		2	–	9	–	0
Villanova		–		2	–	9	–	0
Pittsburgh		–		1	–	10	–	0
Rankings from AP Poll

The 1972 Virginia Tech Gobblers football team was an American football team that represented Virginia Tech as an independent during the 1972 NCAA University Division football season. In their second year under head coach Charlie Coffey, the Gobblers compiled an overall record of 6–4–1.

The 1972 Virginia Tech Gobblers football team represented Virginia Polytechnic Institute and State University as an independent during the 1972 NCAA University Division football season. Led by second-year head coach Charlie Coffey, the Gobblers played their home games at Lane Stadium in Blacksburg, Virginia. Virginia Tech finished the season with a record of 6–4–1. Virginia Tech opened the season with consecutive road losses to Virginia (24–20) and No. 17 Florida State (27–15). The team rebounded with a 13–10 home win over SMU and a 27–27 tie against Houston. In midseason, the Gobblers won three straight games, including a 34–32 victory over Oklahoma State and a 53–21 road win at Ohio. A narrow 17–16 loss to William & Mary ended the streak, but Tech closed the season with wins over Southern Mississippi (27–14), South Carolina (45–20), and Wake Forest (44–9), offset by a 52–13 loss at Alabama. Quarterback Don Strock led the nation in passing yards with 3,243, completing 63.1% of his passes for 21 touchdowns. Wide receiver Mike Scales recorded 826 receiving yards, while fullback Tommy Barber led the team in rushing with 624 yards. Virginia Tech averaged 27.9 points per game and ranked first nationally in passing offense, totaling 3,348 yards through the air. Defensively, the Gobblers allowed 23.0 points per game and 253 total points on the season. Linebacker Mike Widger and defensive back Ron Davidson were among the team’s top tacklers. Virginia Tech outgained opponents by over 495 total yards and finished with a +54 point differential. The 1972 season marked a statistical high point for the program’s passing attack and helped establish Lane Stadium as a growing venue for major college football.

== Schedule ==
Date	Opponent	Site	Result	Attendance	Source
September 16	at Virginia	Scott Stadium; Charlottesville, VA (rivalry)	L 20–24	31,300	
September 23	at No. 17 Florida State	Doak Campbell Stadium; Tallahassee, FL	L 15–27	36,400	
September 30	SMU	Lane Stadium; Blacksburg, VA	W 13–10	26,000	
October 7	Houston	Lane Stadium; Blacksburg, VA	T 27–27	26,000	
October 14	No. 19 Oklahoma State^{†}	Lane Stadium; Blacksburg, VA	W 34–32	36,000	
October 21	at Ohio	Peden Stadium; Athens, OH	W 53–21	13,344	
October 28	vs. William & Mary	City Stadium; Richmond, VA (Tobacco Bowl)	L 16–17	22,000	
November 4	Southern Miss	Lane Stadium; Blacksburg, VA	W 27–14	25,000	
November 11	South Carolina	Lane Stadium; Blacksburg, VA	W 45–20	30,000	
November 18	at No. 2 Alabama	Denny Stadium; Tuscaloosa, AL	L 13–52	57,162	
November 25	at Wake Forest	Groves Stadium; Winston-Salem, NC	W 44–9	6,500	
^{†}Homecoming; Rankings from AP Poll released prior to the game

== Game summaries ==
=== September 16 – at Virginia ===
Virginia Tech opened the season with a 24–20 loss to in-state rival Virginia at Scott Stadium in Charlottesville. Quarterback Don Strock threw touchdown passes to Mike Scales and Ken Edwards, finishing with 287 yards through the air. The Gobblers led 20–17 entering the fourth quarter, but Virginia scored the game-winning touchdown with under five minutes remaining. Attendance: 31,300.

=== September 23 – at No. 17 Florida State ===
Virginia Tech fell 27–15 to No. 17 Florida State in Tallahassee. Don Strock threw a 14-yard touchdown pass to Mike Scales and completed 27 of 45 passes for 312 yards. Dave Strock added a 32-yard field goal. Florida State capitalized on two Tech turnovers and controlled the second half. Attendance: 36,400.

=== September 30 – vs. SMU ===
Virginia Tech earned its first win of the season with a 13–10 victory over SMU at Lane Stadium. Don Strock threw a 9-yard touchdown pass to Mike Scales and passed for 278 yards. Dave Strock kicked two field goals, including the game-winner from 27 yards out in the fourth quarter. Attendance: 26,000.

=== October 7 – vs. Houston ===
Virginia Tech and Houston played to a 27–27 tie in Blacksburg. Don Strock threw three touchdown passes—two to Mike Scales and one to Ken Edwards—and finished with 407 passing yards. Dave Strock added a 24-yard field goal. Houston tied the game with a late touchdown drive. Attendance: 26,000.

=== October 14 – vs. No. 19 Oklahoma State ===
Virginia Tech upset No. 19 Oklahoma State 34–32 at Lane Stadium. Don Strock threw touchdown passes to Mike Scales, Ken Edwards, and tight end Bob Smith, totaling 336 passing yards. Dave Strock kicked two field goals, including the game-winner from 38 yards with under a minute remaining. Attendance: 36,000.

=== October 21 – at Ohio ===
Virginia Tech routed Ohio 53–21 in Athens. Don Strock threw four touchdown passes—two to Mike Scales and one each to Ken Edwards and Bob Smith—and passed for 310 yards. Tommy Barber added a rushing touchdown, and Dave Strock kicked a 42-yard field goal. Attendance: 13,344.

=== October 28 – vs. William & Mary (Tobacco Bowl) ===
Virginia Tech fell 17–16 to William & Mary in the Tobacco Bowl at City Stadium in Richmond. Don Strock threw touchdown passes to Mike Scales and Ken Edwards, but Dave Strock missed a potential game-winning field goal in the final minute. Attendance: 22,000.

=== November 4 – vs. Southern Miss ===
Virginia Tech defeated Southern Miss 27–14 at Lane Stadium. Don Strock threw touchdown passes to Mike Scales and Bob Smith, and Tommy Barber added a rushing touchdown. Dave Strock kicked a 35-yard field goal. Attendance: 25,000.

=== November 11 – vs. South Carolina ===
Virginia Tech routed South Carolina 45–20 in Blacksburg. Don Strock threw three touchdown passes—two to Mike Scales and one to Ken Edwards—and passed for 345 yards. Tommy Barber and Andre Kendrick each scored rushing touchdowns, and Dave Strock added a 40-yard field goal. Attendance: 30,000.

=== November 18 – at No. 2 Alabama ===
Virginia Tech suffered its worst loss of the season, falling 52–13 to No. 2 Alabama in Tuscaloosa. Don Strock threw a touchdown pass to Mike Scales and passed for 265 yards. Dave Strock kicked two field goals. Alabama rushed for six touchdowns and intercepted Strock twice. Attendance: 57,162.

=== November 25 – at Wake Forest ===
Virginia Tech closed the season with a 44–9 win over Wake Forest at Groves Stadium. Don Strock threw four touchdown passes—two to Mike Scales and one each to Ken Edwards and Bob Smith—and passed for 354 yards, securing the NCAA passing title. Tommy Barber added a rushing touchdown, and Dave Strock kicked a 37-yard field goal. Attendance: 6,500.

== Roster ==
The following players were members of the 1972 football team according to the roster published in the 1973 edition of The Bugle, the Virginia Tech yearbook.

1972 Virginia Tech roster
Paul Adams; Bruce Arians; James William "J.B." Barber, Jr.; Larry Bearekman; John Bell; Brent Bledsoe; Morris Blueford; Jack Booth; Glenn Brown; Mike Burnop; Tom Carpenito; M. Cole; Nick Colobro; Chris Courtney; Doug Coyner; Jack Crews; Bobby Dabbs; John Dobbins; Dennis Dodson; Rich Easterling; Bill Ellenbogen; Stephen C. Galloway; Barry Garber; T. Gerdy	David Halstead; Jim Heizer; Kent Henry; Peter Michael Horoszko; Andy Hromyak; Johnson; Bob Karlsen; Howard Keyes; Wayne Latimer; Jim Lawlor; Chip Lawson; Bruce Arthur Lemmert; Billy Linson; Steve Maguigan; Charley Martin; Randy McCann; Lynn McCoy; Bruce McDaniel; Steve Pasi; Chuck Perdue; Vic Perez; Rick Popp; Barney Ratliff; Don Reel	Tom Reynolds; Phil Rogers; Ricky Scales; Jerry Scharnus; John William Schneider; Rodney Schnurr; Chuck Schoenadel; Rod M. Sedwick; Tom Shirley; Chuck Shorter; Dale Soncini; John Sprenkle; Don Sprouse; Terry Stewart; Dave Strock; Don Strock; Andre Tennessee; Don Testerman; Doug Thacker; Greg Toal; Tom Trice; Kit Utz; Craig Valentine
