= 1972 Air Force Falcons football team =

American college football season

1972 Air Force Falcons football
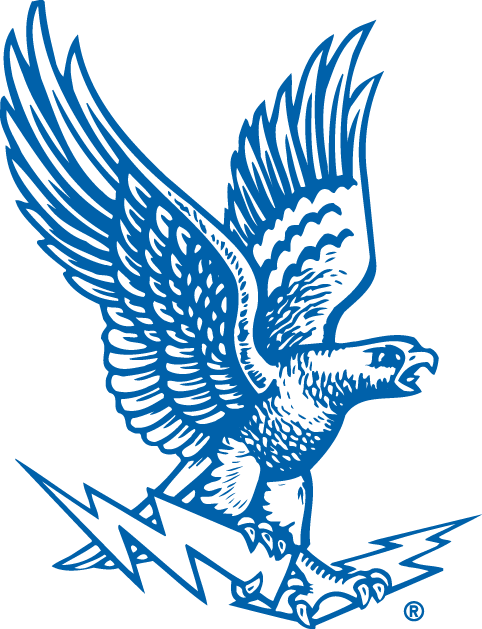
- Conference: Independent
- Record: 6–4
- Head coach: Ben Martin (15th season)
- Captains: Orderia Mitchell; Gene Ogilvie
- Home stadium: Falcon Stadium

1972 NCAA University Division independents football records
| | Conf. | | | Overall |
| Team | W | L | T | W | | L | | T |
|---|---|---|---|---|---|---|---|---|
| No. 10 Penn State | | – | | 10 | – | 2 | – | 0 |
| No. 14 Notre Dame | | – | | 8 | – | 3 | – | 0 |
| Utah State | | – | | 8 | – | 3 | – | 0 |
| West Virginia | | – | | 8 | – | 4 | – | 0 |
| Florida State | | – | | 7 | – | 4 | – | 0 |
| Northern Illinois | | – | | 7 | – | 4 | – | 0 |
| Rutgers | | – | | 7 | – | 4 | – | 0 |
| No. 20 Georgia Tech | | – | | 7 | – | 4 | – | 1 |
| Air Force | | – | | 6 | – | 4 | – | 0 |
| Army | | – | | 6 | – | 4 | – | 0 |
| Virginia Tech | | – | | 6 | – | 4 | – | 1 |
| Houston | | – | | 6 | – | 4 | – | 1 |
| Tulane | | – | | 6 | – | 5 | – | 0 |
| Temple | | – | | 5 | – | 4 | – | 0 |
| Colgate | | – | | 5 | – | 4 | – | 1 |
| Holy Cross | | – | | 5 | – | 4 | – | 1 |
| Syracuse | | – | | 5 | – | 6 | – | 0 |
| Miami (FL) | | – | | 5 | – | 6 | – | 0 |
| Dayton | | – | | 4 | – | 6 | – | 1 |
| Boston College | | – | | 4 | – | 7 | – | 0 |
| Navy | | – | | 4 | – | 7 | – | 0 |
| South Carolina | | – | | 4 | – | 7 | – | 0 |
| Southern Miss | | – | | 3 | – | 7 | – | 1 |
| Xavier | | – | | 3 | – | 8 | – | 0 |
| Marshall | | – | | 2 | – | 8 | – | 0 |
| Cincinnati | | – | | 2 | – | 9 | – | 0 |
| Villanova | | – | | 2 | – | 9 | – | 0 |
| Pittsburgh | | – | | 1 | – | 10 | – | 0 |
Rankings from AP Poll

The 1972 Air Force Falcons football team represented the United States Air Force Academy as an independent during the 1971 NCAA University Division football season. Led by 15th-year head coach Ben Martin, the Falcons compiled a record of 6–4 and outscored their opponents 303–183. Air Force played their home games at Falcon Stadium in Colorado Springs, Colorado.

This was first season of competition for the Commander-in-Chief's Trophy, which matched the three military academies annually. The Falcons lost both games, and Army beat Navy in December to take the first title. Previously, Air Force played Navy in even years and Army in odd years.

== Schedule ==
| Date | Time | Opponent | Rank | Site | Result | Attendance | Source |
|---|---|---|---|---|---|---|---|
| September 16 | 1:31 p.m. | Wyoming | | Falcon Stadium; Colorado Springs, CO | W 45–14 | 38,809 | |
| September 23 | 1:30 p.m. | Pittsburgh | | Falcon Stadium; Colorado Springs, CO | W 41–13 | 37,047 | |
| September 30 | 1:31 p.m. | Davidson | | Falcon Stadium; Colorado Springs, CO | W 68–6 | 33,601 | |
| October 7 | 1:30 p.m. | at Colorado State | No. 19 | Hughes Stadium; Fort Collins, CO (rivalry) | W 52–13 | 23,221 | |
| October 14 | 11:30 a.m. | at Boston College | No. 16 | Alumni Stadium; Chestnut Hill, MA | W 13–9 | 22,313 | |
| October 21 | 1:30 p.m. | Navy | No. 16 | Falcon Stadium; Colorado Springs, CO (Commander-in-Chief's Trophy) | L 17–21 | 39,078 | |
| October 28 | 1:20 p.m. | at No. 16 Arizona State | | Sun Devil Stadium; Tempe, AZ | W 39–31 | 47,091 | |
| November 4 | 11:29 a.m. | at Army | No. 19 | Michie Stadium; West Point, NY (Commander-in-Chief's Trophy) | L 14–17 | 42,399 | |
| November 11 | 1:00 p.m. | No. 12 Notre Dame | | Falcon Stadium; Colorado Springs, CO (rivalry) | L 7–21 | 48,671 | |
| November 18 | 1:02 p.m. | No. 15 Colorado | | Falcon Stadium; Colorado Springs, CO | L 7–38 | 47,191 | |
Rankings from AP Poll released prior to the game; All times are in Mountain time

== Roster ==
1972 Air Force Falcons football team roster
| Players | | | Coaches |
|---|---|---|---|
| Offense: Pos. / # / Name / Class; C / / Orderia Mitchell (C) / Sr | Defense: Pos. / # / Name / Class; DL / / Eugene Ogilvie (C) / Sr | Special teams: Pos. / # / Name / Class | Head coach: Ben Martin; Coordinators/assistant coaches Legend: (C) Team captain; (S) Suspended; (I) Ineligible; Injured; Redshirt |

== Awards and honors ==
- Orderia Mitchell, 2nd Team All-American (AP)
