= 1972 Vermont Catamounts football team =

American college football season

1972 Vermont Catamounts football
- Conference: Yankee Conference
- Record: 4–5 (3–2 Yankee)
- Head coach: Carl Falivene (1st season)
- Home stadium: Centennial Field

1972 Yankee Conference football standings
| | Conf. | | | | | Overall |
| Team | W | | L | | T | W | | L | | T |
|---|---|---|---|---|---|---|---|---|---|---|
| UMass $ | 5 | – | 0 | – | 0 | 9 | – | 2 | – | 0 |
| Connecticut | 4 | – | 1 | – | 0 | 4 | – | 5 | – | 0 |
| Vermont | 3 | – | 2 | – | 0 | 4 | – | 5 | – | 0 |
| New Hampshire | 2 | – | 3 | – | 0 | 4 | – | 5 | – | 0 |
| Maine | 1 | – | 4 | – | 0 | 3 | – | 6 | – | 0 |
| Rhode Island | 0 | – | 5 | – | 0 | 3 | – | 7 | – | 0 |
$ – Conference champion

The 1972 Vermont Catamounts football team was an American football team that represented the University of Vermont in the Yankee Conference during the 1972 NCAA College Division football season. In their first year under head coach Carl Falivene, the team compiled a 4–5 record.

== Schedule ==
| Date | Opponent | Site | Result | Attendance | Source |
|---|---|---|---|---|---|
| September 23 | at Connecticut | Memorial Stadium; Storrs, CT | L 0–7 | 10,864 | |
| September 30 | at Lehigh* | Taylor Stadium; Bethlehem, PA | L 20–26 | 5,000 | |
| October 7 | UMass | Centennial Field; Burlington, VT | L 14–33 | 4,700 | |
| October 14 | at Rhode Island | Meade Stadium; Kingston, RI | W 14–13 | 5,857 | |
| October 21 | New Hampshire | Centennial Field; Burlington, VT | W 28–17 | 7,000–7,100 | |
| October 28 | Hofstra* | Centennial Field; Burlington, VT | W 16–10 | | |
| November 5 | at Maine | Alumni Field; Orono, ME | W 15–14 | 4,513–5,000 | |
| November 11 | Northeastern* | Centennial Field; Burlington, VT | L 19–29 | 7,127 | |
| November 18 | at American International* | Miller Field; Springfield, MA | L 28–37 | 2,400 | |
*Non-conference game
