= 1972 Boston College Eagles football team =

American college football season

1972 Boston College Eagles football
- Conference: Independent
- Record: 4–7
- Head coach: Joe Yukica (5th season)
- Defensive coordinator: John Petercuskie (4th season)
- Captains: Dave Bucci; Dave Ellison
- Home stadium: Alumni Stadium

1972 NCAA University Division independents football records
	Conf.			Overall
Team	W	L	T	W		L		T
No. 10 Penn State		–		10	–	2	–	0
No. 14 Notre Dame		–		8	–	3	–	0
Utah State		–		8	–	3	–	0
West Virginia		–		8	–	4	–	0
Florida State		–		7	–	4	–	0
Northern Illinois		–		7	–	4	–	0
Rutgers		–		7	–	4	–	0
No. 20 Georgia Tech		–		7	–	4	–	1
Air Force		–		6	–	4	–	0
Army		–		6	–	4	–	0
Virginia Tech		–		6	–	4	–	1
Houston		–		6	–	4	–	1
Tulane		–		6	–	5	–	0
Temple		–		5	–	4	–	0
Colgate		–		5	–	4	–	1
Holy Cross		–		5	–	4	–	1
Syracuse		–		5	–	6	–	0
Miami (FL)		–		5	–	6	–	0
Dayton		–		4	–	6	–	1
Boston College		–		4	–	7	–	0
Navy		–		4	–	7	–	0
South Carolina		–		4	–	7	–	0
Southern Miss		–		3	–	7	–	1
Xavier		–		3	–	8	–	0
Marshall		–		2	–	8	–	0
Cincinnati		–		2	–	9	–	0
Villanova		–		2	–	9	–	0
Pittsburgh		–		1	–	10	–	0
Rankings from AP Poll

The 1972 Boston College Eagles football team represented Boston College as an independent during the 1972 NCAA University Division football season. Led by fifth-year head coach Joe Yukica, the Eagles compiled a record of 4–7. Boston College played home games at Alumni Stadium in Chestnut Hill, Massachusetts.

== Schedule ==
Date	Time	Opponent	Site	Result	Attendance	Source
September 16		Tulane	Alumni Stadium; Chestnut Hill, MA	L 0–10	27,441	
September 23		Temple	Alumni Stadium; Chestnut Hill, MA	W 49–27	21,732	
September 30		at Navy	Navy–Marine Corps Memorial Stadium; Annapolis, MD	L 20–27	23,121	
October 7	1:32 p.m.	at Villanova	Villanova Stadium; Villanova, PA	W 21–20	11,500	
October 14	1:30 p.m.	No. 16 Air Force	Alumni Stadium; Chestnut Hill, MA	L 9–13	22,313	
October 21		at Pittsburgh	Pitt Stadium; Pittsburgh, PA	L 20–35	18,116	
November 4		Syracuse	Alumni Stadium; Chestnut Hill, MA	W 37–0	21,216	
November 11		at Georgia Tech	Grant Field; Atlanta, GA	L 10–42	36,114	
November 18		No. 6 Penn State	Alumni Stadium; Chestnut Hill, MA	L 26–45	23,119	
November 25		at UMass	Alumni Stadium; Hadley, MA (rivalry)	L 7–28	20,000	
December 2		Holy Cross	Alumni Stadium; Chestnut Hill, MA (rivalry)	W 41–11	30,187	
Rankings from AP Poll released prior to the game; All times are in Eastern time
