= 1972 Cincinnati Bearcats football team =

American college football season

1972 Cincinnati Bearcats football
- Conference: Independent
- Record: 2–9
- Head coach: Ray Callahan (4th season)
- Captain: Billy Hunter
- Home stadium: Nippert Stadium

1972 NCAA University Division independents football records
	Conf.			Overall
Team	W	L	T	W		L		T
No. 10 Penn State		–		10	–	2	–	0
No. 14 Notre Dame		–		8	–	3	–	0
Utah State		–		8	–	3	–	0
West Virginia		–		8	–	4	–	0
Florida State		–		7	–	4	–	0
Northern Illinois		–		7	–	4	–	0
Rutgers		–		7	–	4	–	0
No. 20 Georgia Tech		–		7	–	4	–	1
Air Force		–		6	–	4	–	0
Army		–		6	–	4	–	0
Virginia Tech		–		6	–	4	–	1
Houston		–		6	–	4	–	1
Tulane		–		6	–	5	–	0
Temple		–		5	–	4	–	0
Colgate		–		5	–	4	–	1
Holy Cross		–		5	–	4	–	1
Syracuse		–		5	–	6	–	0
Miami (FL)		–		5	–	6	–	0
Dayton		–		4	–	6	–	1
Boston College		–		4	–	7	–	0
Navy		–		4	–	7	–	0
South Carolina		–		4	–	7	–	0
Southern Miss		–		3	–	7	–	1
Xavier		–		3	–	8	–	0
Marshall		–		2	–	8	–	0
Cincinnati		–		2	–	9	–	0
Villanova		–		2	–	9	–	0
Pittsburgh		–		1	–	10	–	0
Rankings from AP Poll

The 1972 Cincinnati Bearcats football team represented University of Cincinnati as an independent during the 1972 NCAA University Division football season. Led by Ray Callahan in his fourth and final season as head coach, the Bearcats compiled a record of 2–9. The team played home games at Nippert Stadium in Cincinnati.

== Schedule ==
Date	Time	Opponent	Site	Result	Attendance	Source
September 9	8:00 p.m.	at Indiana State	Memorial Stadium; Terre Haute, IN	W 10–7	13,500	
September 16	3:30 p.m.	at No. 2 Colorado	Folsom Field; Boulder, CO	L 14–56	50,171	
September 23	8:00 p.m.	Xavier	Nippert Stadium; Cincinnati, OH (rivalry)	L 7–19	15,435	
September 30	8:00 p.m.	Villanova	Nippert Stadium; Cincinnati, OH	W 14–7	5,681	
October 7	8:00 p.m.	Ohio	Nippert Stadium; Cincinnati, OH	L 14–28	8,511	
October 14	8:30 p.m.	at Wichita State	Cessna Stadium; Wichita, KS	L 17–20	15,916	
October 28	2:00 p.m.	Louisville	Nippert Stadium; Cincinnati, OH (The Keg of Nails)	L 13–38	11,261	
November 4	8:30 p.m.	at North Texas State	Texas Stadium; Irving, TX	L 25–27	2,000	
November 11		at Memphis State	Memphis Memorial Stadium; Memphis, TN (rivalry)	L 24–49	16,050	
November 18	1:30 p.m.	Miami (OH)	Nippert Stadium; Cincinnati, OH (Victory Bell)	L 0–23	7,695	
November 25	8:30 p.m.	at Houston	Astrodome; Houston, TX	L 0–49	18,795	
Rankings from AP Poll released prior to the game; All times are in Eastern time

== Game Films ==
- 1972 Cincinnati - Indiana State Football Game Film
- 1972 Cincinnati - Colorado Football Game Film
- 1972 Cincinnati - Villanova Football Game Film
- 1972 Cincinnati - Ohio U Football Game Film
- 1972 Cincinnati - Louisville Football Game Film
- 1972 Cincinnati at Memphis State Pregame Band Program
- 1972 Cincinnati - Miami (Oh) Football Game Film, Reel 1
- 1972 Cincinnati - Miami (Oh) Football Game Film, Reel 2
- 1972 Cincinnati - Miami (Oh) Football Game Film, Reel 3
- 1972 Cincinnati - Miami (Oh) Football Game Film, Reel 4
- 1972 Cincinnati - Miami (Oh) Football Game Film, Reel 5
