= 1973 Vermont Catamounts football team =

American college football season

1973 Vermont Catamounts football
- Conference: Yankee Conference
- Record: 3–6 (1–5 Yankee)
- Head coach: Carl Falivene (2nd season)
- Home stadium: Centennial Field

1973 Yankee Conference football standings
	Conf.					Overall
Team	W		L		T	W		L		T
Connecticut $	5	–	0	–	1	8	–	2	–	1
Rhode Island	4	–	1	–	1	6	–	2	–	2
UMass	4	–	2	–	0	6	–	5	–	0
New Hampshire	2	–	3	–	0	4	–	5	–	0
Boston University	2	–	3	–	0	3	–	7	–	0
Maine	2	–	4	–	0	3	–	7	–	0
Vermont	1	–	5	–	0	3	–	6	–	0
$ – Conference champion

The 1973 Vermont Catamounts football team was an American football team that represented the University of Vermont in the Yankee Conference during the 1973 NCAA Division II football season. In their second year under head coach Carl Falivene, the team compiled a 3–6 record.

== Schedule ==
Date	Opponent	Site	Result	Attendance	Source
September 8	Maine	Centennial Field; Burlington, VT	L 0–14	7,000–7,500	
September 15	American International*	Centennial Field; Burlington, VT	W 14–7	4,312	
September 22	Connecticut	Centennial Field; Burlington, VT	L 14–26	2,350–4,000	
September 29	at Boston University	Schaefer Stadium; Foxborough, MA	W 15–0	3,508–8,508	
October 13	Rhode Island	Centennial Field; Burlington, VT	L 14–15	7,432–7,500	
October 20	at New Hampshire	Cowell Stadium; Durham, NH	L 7–19	9,995	
October 27	at Hofstra*	Hofstra Stadium; Hempstead, NY	W 10–7	4,800–4,836	
November 3	at UMass	Alumni Stadium; Hadley, MA	L 7–27	11,300	
November 10	at Bucknell*	Memorial Stadium; Lewisburg, PA	L 7–26	7,500	
*Non-conference game
