= Jack Gregory (American football coach) =

American football player, coach, and administrator (1927–2014)

Biographical details
- Born: June 8, 1927; East Lansdowne, Pennsylvania, U.S.
- Died: December 4, 2014 (aged 87); East Lansdowne, Pennsylvania, U.S.

Playing career
- 1947: West Chester
- 1949–1951: East Stroudsburg
- Position: Guard

Coaching career (HC unless noted)
- 1952–1953: William Penn HS (DE) (line)
- 1954–1958: P. S. Dupont HS (DE)
- 1959–1965: East Stroudsburg
- 1966: Navy (assistant)
- 1967–1969: Villanova
- 1970–1975: Rhode Island

Administrative career (AD unless noted)
- 1978–1982: Yale (assistant AD)
- 1982–1994: Bowling Green

Head coaching record
- Overall: 87–57–4 (college); 25–15 (high school)

Accomplishments and honors

Championships
- 2 PSAC (1964–1965); 3 PSAC Eastern Division (1962, 1964–1965)

John C. Gregory Jr. (June 8, 1927 – December 4, 2014) was an American football player, coach, and college athletics administrator. He served as the head football coach at East Stroudsburg University of Pennsylvania (1959–1965), Villanova University (1967–1969), and the University of Rhode Island (1970–1975), compiling a career college football record of 87–57–4. He was the athletic director at Bowling Green State University from 1982 to 1994.

Gregory attended high in Lansdowne, Pennsylvania. He played college football at West Chester Teachers College—now known as West Chester University, before transferring to East Stroudsburg in 1949. Gregory played as lineman at East Stroudsburg for three seasons and graduated in 1952.

Gregory began his coaching career at William Penn High School in New Castle, Delaware, where he was an assistant to head football coach Billy Cole in 1952 and 1953, coaching the line. He was hired as the head football coach at P. S. Dupont High School in Wilmington, Delaware in 1954, where he tallied a mark of 25–15 in five seasons. He died in Philadelphia in 2014. He was inducted into the Delaware Sports Hall of Fame as part of its 2020/2021 class.

== Head coaching record ==
=== College ===
Year	Team	Overall	Conference	Standing	Bowl/playoffs
East Stroudsburg Warriors (Pennsylvania State Athletic Conference) (1959–1966)
1959	East Stroudsburg	5–2–2	3–2	5th	
1960	East Stroudsburg	6–3	5–3	4th (East)	
1961	East Stroudsburg	7–1	5–1	2nd (East)	
1962	East Stroudsburg	8–1	6–0	1st (East)	
1963	East Stroudsburg	5–3	4–2	T–2nd (East)	
1964	East Stroudsburg	8–1	6–0	1st (East)	
1965	East Stroudsburg	10–0	6–0	1st (East)	
East Stroudsburg:		49–11–2	35–8		
Villanova Wildcats (NCAA University Division independent) (1967–1969)
1967	Villanova	4–6			
1968	Villanova	6–4			
1969	Villanova	6–3			
Villanova:		16–13			
Rhode Island Rams (Yankee Conference) (1970–1975)
1970	Rhode Island	3–5	3–2	T–3rd	
1971	Rhode Island	3–6	2–3	T–4th	
1972	Rhode Island	3–7	0–5	6th	
1973	Rhode Island	6–2–2	4–1–1	2nd	
1974	Rhode Island	5–5	3–3	T–3rd	
1975	Rhode Island	2–8	1–4	4th	
Rhode Island:		22–33–2	13–18–1		
Total:		87–57–4			
National championship Conference title Conference division title or championship game berth
