= 1973 Boston University Terriers football team =

American college football season

1973 Boston University Terriers football
- Conference: Yankee Conference
- Record: 3–7 (1–4 Yankee)
- Head coach: Paul Kemp (1st season)
- Home stadium: Nickerson Field

1973 Yankee Conference football standings
| | Conf. | | | | | Overall |
| Team | W | | L | | T | W | | L | | T |
|---|---|---|---|---|---|---|---|---|---|---|
| Connecticut $ | 5 | – | 0 | – | 1 | 8 | – | 2 | – | 1 |
| Rhode Island | 4 | – | 1 | – | 1 | 6 | – | 2 | – | 2 |
| UMass | 4 | – | 2 | – | 0 | 6 | – | 5 | – | 0 |
| New Hampshire | 2 | – | 3 | – | 0 | 4 | – | 5 | – | 0 |
| Boston University | 2 | – | 3 | – | 0 | 3 | – | 7 | – | 0 |
| Maine | 2 | – | 4 | – | 0 | 3 | – | 7 | – | 0 |
| Vermont | 1 | – | 5 | – | 0 | 3 | – | 6 | – | 0 |
$ – Conference champion

The 1973 Boston University Terriers football team was an American football team that represented Boston University as a member of the Yankee Conference during the 1973 NCAA Division II football season. In their first season under head coach Paul Kemp, the Terriers compiled a 3–7 record (1–4 against conference opponents) and were outscored by a total of 170 to 95.

Boston University played its home games on Nickerson Field, which was part of the Case Sports Complex and was formerly known as Braves Field, the home of the Boston Braves.

== Schedule ==
| Date | Opponent | Site | Result | Attendance | Source |
|---|---|---|---|---|---|
| September 15 | at Maine | Alumni Field; Orono, ME | W 16–13 | 4,707 | |
| September 22 | at Bucknell* | Memorial Stadium; Lewisburg, PA | L 6–24 | 6,500 | |
| September 29 | Vermont | Schaefer Stadium; Foxborough, MA | L 0–15 | 3,508–8,508 | |
| October 6 | at Harvard* | Harvard Stadium; Boston, MA | L 0–16 | 13,000 | |
| October 13 | UMass | Alumni Stadium; Hadley, MA | L 6–20 | 6,679 | |
| October 20 | at Temple* | Temple Stadium; Philadelphia, PA | L 15–35 | 9,692 | |
| October 27 | at Rhode Island | Meade Stadium; Kingston, RI | L 9–14 | 8,350 | |
| November 3 | Northeastern* | Nickerson Field; Boston, MA | W 30–14 | 2,000–6,683 | |
| November 10 | Connecticut | Nickerson Field; Boston, MA | L 10–19 | 4,557 | |
| November 17 | at Colgate* | Andy Kerr Stadium; Hamilton, NY | W 3–0 | 3,500–4,000 | |
*Non-conference game
