= 1972 Utah State Aggies football team =

American college football season

1972 Utah State Aggies football
- Conference: Independent

Ranking
- Coaches: No. T–17
- Record: 8–3
- Head coach: Chuck Mills (6th season)
- Home stadium: Romney Stadium

1972 NCAA University Division independents football records
	Conf.			Overall
Team	W	L	T	W		L		T
No. 10 Penn State		–		10	–	2	–	0
No. 14 Notre Dame		–		8	–	3	–	0
Utah State		–		8	–	3	–	0
West Virginia		–		8	–	4	–	0
Florida State		–		7	–	4	–	0
Northern Illinois		–		7	–	4	–	0
Rutgers		–		7	–	4	–	0
No. 20 Georgia Tech		–		7	–	4	–	1
Air Force		–		6	–	4	–	0
Army		–		6	–	4	–	0
Virginia Tech		–		6	–	4	–	1
Houston		–		6	–	4	–	1
Tulane		–		6	–	5	–	0
Temple		–		5	–	4	–	0
Colgate		–		5	–	4	–	1
Holy Cross		–		5	–	4	–	1
Syracuse		–		5	–	6	–	0
Miami (FL)		–		5	–	6	–	0
Dayton		–		4	–	6	–	1
Boston College		–		4	–	7	–	0
Navy		–		4	–	7	–	0
South Carolina		–		4	–	7	–	0
Southern Miss		–		3	–	7	–	1
Xavier		–		3	–	8	–	0
Marshall		–		2	–	8	–	0
Cincinnati		–		2	–	9	–	0
Villanova		–		2	–	9	–	0
Pittsburgh		–		1	–	10	–	0
Rankings from AP Poll

The 1972 Utah State Aggies football team represented Utah State University in the 1972 NCAA University Division football season. Led by sixth-year head coach Chuck Mills, the team played its home games at Romney Stadium in Logan, Utah. Competing as an NCAA University Division independent, the team compiled an 8–3 record and finished the season ranked number 17 in the Coaches Poll. This was the last time Utah State finished ranked in either the Coaches Poll or AP Poll until the 2012 season.

== Schedule ==
Date	Opponent	Site	Result	Attendance	Source
September 9	at New Mexico State	Memorial Stadium; Las Cruces, NM	W 48–14	13,225	
September 16	at No. 4 Oklahoma	Oklahoma Memorial Stadium; Norman, OK	L 0–49	61,826	
September 23	at BYU	Cougar Stadium; Provo, UT (rivalry)	W 42–19	35,239	
September 30	Colorado State	Romney Stadium; Logan, UT	W 21–0	12,125	
October 7	at No. 9 Texas	Memorial Stadium; Austin, TX	L 12–27	58,122	
October 14	at Memphis State	Memphis Memorial Stadium; Memphis, TN	L 29–38	17,760	
October 28	at Wyoming	War Memorial Stadium; Laramie, WY (rivalry)	W 35–23	15,371	
November 4	Idaho	Romney Stadium; Logan, UT	W 51–7	8,575	
November 11	Utah	Romney Stadium; Logan, UT (Battle of the Brothers)	W 44–16	19,434	
November 18	Southern Miss	Romney Stadium; Logan, UT	W 27–21	8,805	
November 23	Weber State	Romney Stadium; Logan, UT	W 20–16	8,115	
Rankings from AP Poll released prior to the game
