= 1972 Tulane Green Wave football team =

American college football season

1972 Tulane Green Wave football
- Conference: Independent
- Record: 6–5
- Head coach: Bennie Ellender (2nd season)
- Home stadium: Tulane Stadium

1972 NCAA University Division independents football records
	Conf.			Overall
Team	W	L	T	W		L		T
No. 10 Penn State		–		10	–	2	–	0
No. 14 Notre Dame		–		8	–	3	–	0
Utah State		–		8	–	3	–	0
West Virginia		–		8	–	4	–	0
Florida State		–		7	–	4	–	0
Northern Illinois		–		7	–	4	–	0
Rutgers		–		7	–	4	–	0
No. 20 Georgia Tech		–		7	–	4	–	1
Air Force		–		6	–	4	–	0
Army		–		6	–	4	–	0
Virginia Tech		–		6	–	4	–	1
Houston		–		6	–	4	–	1
Tulane		–		6	–	5	–	0
Temple		–		5	–	4	–	0
Colgate		–		5	–	4	–	1
Holy Cross		–		5	–	4	–	1
Syracuse		–		5	–	6	–	0
Miami (FL)		–		5	–	6	–	0
Dayton		–		4	–	6	–	1
Boston College		–		4	–	7	–	0
Navy		–		4	–	7	–	0
South Carolina		–		4	–	7	–	0
Southern Miss		–		3	–	7	–	1
Xavier		–		3	–	8	–	0
Marshall		–		2	–	8	–	0
Cincinnati		–		2	–	9	–	0
Villanova		–		2	–	9	–	0
Pittsburgh		–		1	–	10	–	0
Rankings from AP Poll

The 1972 Tulane Green Wave football team was an American football team that represented Tulane University during the 1972 NCAA University Division football season as an independent. In their second year under head coach Bennie Ellender, the team compiled a 6–5 record.

In Tulane's loss at Miami, the Hurricanes were erroneously awarded a fifth down late in the fourth quarter, helping them drive to the winning touchdown. The Southeastern Conference, which assigned the officials for the game, acknowledged the error, but it was too late to change the outcome. Nearly two months later, Tulane came up achingly short in its quest to end a 24-year winless streak vs. archrival LSU in the season finale. Trailing 9–3 with seconds remaining, Green Wave halfback Bill Huber took a swing pass in the flat and appeared headed to a touchdown, but he was stopped at the 1-yard line by Tiger safety Frank Racine after time ran out.

== Schedule ==
Date	Time	Opponent	Rank	Site	Result	Attendance	Source
September 16		at Boston College		Alumni Stadium; Chestnut Hill, MA	W 10–0	27,441	
September 23		No. 16 Georgia		Tulane Stadium; New Orleans, LA	W 24–13	43,064	
September 30		at No. 8 Michigan	No. 18	Michigan Stadium; Ann Arbor, MI	L 7–41	84,162	
October 7		Pittsburgh		Tulane Stadium; New Orleans, LA	W 38–6	20,417	
October 14		at Miami (FL)		Miami Orange Bowl; Miami, FL	L 21–24	18,956	
October 21		at West Virginia		Mountaineer Field; Morgantown, WV	L 19–31	29,500	
October 28		at Georgia Tech		Grant Field; Atlanta, GA	L 7–21	48,096	
November 4		Kentucky		Tulane Stadium; New Orleans, LA	W 18–7	18,377	
November 11	7:34 p.m.	Ohio		Tulane Stadium; New Orleans, LA	W 44–6	17,535	
November 18		at Vanderbilt		Dudley Field; Nashville, TN	W 21–7	10,000	
December 2		No. 11 LSU		Tulane Stadium; New Orleans, LA (Battle for the Rag)	L 3–9	85,372	
Rankings from AP Poll released prior to the game; All times are in Central time

== Roster ==
1972 Tulane Green Wave football team roster
Players
Coaches
Offense

Pos.	#	Name	Class
WR	22	Mike Foley	Jr
C	50	Rob Foley	Jr
QB	10	Steve Foley	So
QB	16	Mike Walker	Sr

Defense

Pos.	#	Name	Class
DE	80	Rusty Lee	Sr

Special teams

Pos.	#	Name	Class

Head coach

- Bennie Ellender

Coordinators/assistant coaches

Legend

- (C) Team captain
- (S) Suspended
- (I) Ineligible
- Injured
- Redshirt
