= 1972 Navy Midshipmen football team =

American college football season

1972 Navy Midshipmen football
- Conference: Independent
- Record: 4–7
- Head coach: Rick Forzano (4th season)
- Captain: Jim Garban
- Home stadium: Navy–Marine Corps Memorial Stadium

1972 NCAA University Division independents football records
	Conf.			Overall
Team	W	L	T	W		L		T
No. 10 Penn State		–		10	–	2	–	0
No. 14 Notre Dame		–		8	–	3	–	0
Utah State		–		8	–	3	–	0
West Virginia		–		8	–	4	–	0
Florida State		–		7	–	4	–	0
Northern Illinois		–		7	–	4	–	0
Rutgers		–		7	–	4	–	0
No. 20 Georgia Tech		–		7	–	4	–	1
Air Force		–		6	–	4	–	0
Army		–		6	–	4	–	0
Virginia Tech		–		6	–	4	–	1
Houston		–		6	–	4	–	1
Tulane		–		6	–	5	–	0
Temple		–		5	–	4	–	0
Colgate		–		5	–	4	–	1
Holy Cross		–		5	–	4	–	1
Syracuse		–		5	–	6	–	0
Miami (FL)		–		5	–	6	–	0
Dayton		–		4	–	6	–	1
Boston College		–		4	–	7	–	0
Navy		–		4	–	7	–	0
South Carolina		–		4	–	7	–	0
Southern Miss		–		3	–	7	–	1
Xavier		–		3	–	8	–	0
Marshall		–		2	–	8	–	0
Cincinnati		–		2	–	9	–	0
Villanova		–		2	–	9	–	0
Pittsburgh		–		1	–	10	–	0
Rankings from AP Poll

The 1972 Navy Midshipmen football team represented the United States Naval Academy (USNA) as an independent during the 1972 NCAA University Division football season. The team was led by fourth-year head coach Rick Forzano.

== Schedule ==
Date	Time	Opponent	Site	Result	Attendance	Source
September 16		William & Mary	Navy–Marine Corps Memorial Stadium; Annapolis, MD	W 13–9	16,196	
September 23	1:30 p.m.	at No. 11 Penn State	Beaver Stadium; University Park, PA	L 10–21	50,457	
September 30		Boston College^{†}	Navy–Marine Corps Memorial Stadium; Annapolis, MD	W 27–20	23,121	
October 7	1:30 p.m.	at No. 5 Michigan	Michigan Stadium; Ann Arbor, MI	L 7–35	81,131	
October 14	1:30 p.m.	at Syracuse	Archbold Stadium; Syracuse, NY	L 14–30	22,187	
October 21	3:30 p.m.	at No. 16 Air Force	Falcon Stadium; Colorado Springs, CO (Commander-in-Chief's Trophy)	W 21–17	39,078	
October 28		vs. Duke	Foreman Field; Norfolk, VA (Oyster Bowl)	L 16–17	26,000	
November 4	1:30 p.m.	vs. No. 12 Notre Dame	Veterans Stadium; Philadelphia, PA (rivalry)	L 23–42	43,089	
November 11	1:30 p.m.	Pittsburgh	Navy–Marine Corps Memorial Stadium; Annapolis, MD	W 28–13	21,244	
November 18	2:00 p.m.	at Georgia Tech	Grant Field; Atlanta, GA	L 7–30	39,233	
December 2	12:55 p.m.	vs. Army	John F. Kennedy Stadium; Philadelphia, PA (Army–Navy Game)	L 15–23	95,774	
^{†}Homecoming; Rankings from AP Poll released prior to the game; All times are in Eastern time

== Game summaries ==
=== Army ===
- Cleveland Cooper 112 yards rushing

== Roster ==
1972 Navy Midshipmen football team roster
Players
Coaches
Offense

Pos.	#	Name	Class
RB	24	Dan Howard	So
RB		Cleveland Cooper	So
		Larry Van Loan

Defense

Pos.	#	Name	Class

Special teams

Pos.	#	Name	Class

Head coach

- Rick Forzano

Coordinators/assistant coaches

Legend

- (C) Team captain
- (S) Suspended
- (I) Ineligible
- Injured
- Redshirt
