= 1972 New Hampshire Wildcats football team =

American college football season

1972 New Hampshire Wildcats football
- Conference: Yankee Conference
- Record: 4–5 (2–3 Yankee)
- Head coach: Bill Bowes (1st season)
- Home stadium: Cowell Stadium

1972 Yankee Conference football standings
| | Conf. | | | | | Overall |
| Team | W | | L | | T | W | | L | | T |
|---|---|---|---|---|---|---|---|---|---|---|
| UMass $ | 5 | – | 0 | – | 0 | 9 | – | 2 | – | 0 |
| Connecticut | 4 | – | 1 | – | 0 | 4 | – | 5 | – | 0 |
| Vermont | 3 | – | 2 | – | 0 | 4 | – | 5 | – | 0 |
| New Hampshire | 2 | – | 3 | – | 0 | 4 | – | 5 | – | 0 |
| Maine | 1 | – | 4 | – | 0 | 3 | – | 6 | – | 0 |
| Rhode Island | 0 | – | 5 | – | 0 | 3 | – | 7 | – | 0 |
$ – Conference champion

The 1972 New Hampshire Wildcats football team was an American football team that represented the University of New Hampshire as a member of the Yankee Conference during the 1972 NCAA College Division football season. In its first year under head coach Bill Bowes, the team compiled a 4–5 record (2–3 against conference opponents) and finished fourth out of six teams in the Yankee Conference.

== Schedule ==
| Date | Opponent | Site | Result | Attendance | Source |
|---|---|---|---|---|---|
| September 23 | Boston University* | Cowell Stadium; Durham, NH | W 16–14 | 9,874 | |
| September 30 | at Dartmouth* | Memorial Field; Hanover, NH (rivalry) | L 14–24 | 10,350 | |
| October 7 | Connecticut | Cowell Stadium; Durham, NH | L 7–10 | 2,511 | |
| October 14 | Maine | Cowell Stadium; Durham, NH (Battle for the Brice–Cowell Musket) | W 17–14 | 12,733–14,700 | |
| October 21 | at Vermont | Centennial Field; Burlington, VT | L 17–28 | 7,000–7,100 | |
| October 28 | at Northeastern* | Parsons Field; Brookline, MA | L 7–9 | 4,522 | |
| November 4 | Rhode Island | Cowell Stadium; Durham, NH | W 14–10 | 9,500–9,513 | |
| November 11 | Springfield* | Cowell Stadium; Durham, NH | W 26–16 | 6,573 | |
| November 18 | at UMass | Alumni Stadium; Hadley, MA (rivalry) | L 7–42 | 11,700 | |
*Non-conference game
