= 1972 Maine Black Bears football team =

American college football season

1972 Maine Black Bears football
- Conference: Yankee Conference
- Record: 3–6 (1–4 Yankee)
- Head coach: Walter Abbott (6th season)
- Captains: James Reid; Robert McConnell
- Home stadium: Alumni Field

1972 Yankee Conference football standings
	Conf.					Overall
Team	W		L		T	W		L		T
UMass $	5	–	0	–	0	9	–	2	–	0
Connecticut	4	–	1	–	0	4	–	5	–	0
Vermont	3	–	2	–	0	4	–	5	–	0
New Hampshire	2	–	3	–	0	4	–	5	–	0
Maine	1	–	4	–	0	3	–	6	–	0
Rhode Island	0	–	5	–	0	3	–	7	–	0
$ – Conference champion

The 1972 Maine Black Bears football team was an American football team that represented the University of Maine as a member of the Yankee Conference during the 1972 NCAA College Division football season. In its sixth season under head coach Walter Abbott, the team compiled a 3–6 record (1–4 against conference opponents) and finished fifth out of six teams in the Yankee Conference. James Reid and Robert McConnell were the team captains.

== Schedule ==
Date	Opponent	Site	Result	Attendance	Source
September 15	at Boston University*	Alumni Field; Orono, ME	W 25–7	6,898–9,000	
September 23	at UMass	Alumni Stadium; Amherst, MA	L 0–37	8,500–9,500	
September 30	Bucknell*	Alumni Field; Orono, ME	L 14–17	5,000–5,500	
October 7	Rhode Island	Alumni Field; Orono, ME	W 10–7	6,300–7,000	
October 14	at New Hampshire	Cowell Stadium; Durham, NH	L 14–17	12,733–14,700	
October 21	at Connecticut	Memorial Stadium; Storrs, CT	L 9–31	10,000–10,765	
October 28	Lafayette*	Alumni Stadium; Orono, ME	W 16–6	7,588	
November 4	Vermont	Alumni Field; Orono, ME	L 14–15	4,513–5,000	
November 11	at No. 1 Delaware*	Delaware Stadium; Newark, DE	L 0–62	18,016–18,018	
*Non-conference game; Rankings from AP Poll released prior to the game
