= 1973 Maine Black Bears football team =

American college football season

1973 Maine Black Bears football
- Conference: Yankee Conference
- Record: 3–7 (2–4 Yankee)
- Head coach: Walter Abbott (7th season)
- Captains: Andrew Mellow; John O'Rourke Jr.; Jack Lamborghini
- Home stadium: Alumni Field

1973 Yankee Conference football standings
	Conf.					Overall
Team	W		L		T	W		L		T
Connecticut $	5	–	0	–	1	8	–	2	–	1
Rhode Island	4	–	1	–	1	6	–	2	–	2
UMass	4	–	2	–	0	6	–	5	–	0
New Hampshire	2	–	3	–	0	4	–	5	–	0
Boston University	2	–	3	–	0	3	–	7	–	0
Maine	2	–	4	–	0	3	–	7	–	0
Vermont	1	–	5	–	0	3	–	6	–	0
$ – Conference champion

The 1973 Maine Black Bears football team was an American football team that represented the University of Maine as a member of the Yankee Conference during the 1973 NCAA Division II football season. In its seventh season under head coach Walter Abbott, the team compiled a 3–7 record (2–4 against conference opponents) and finished sixth out of seven teams in the Yankee Conference. Andrew Mellow, John O'Rourke Jr., and Jack Lamborghini were the team captains.

== Schedule ==
Date	Opponent	Site	Result	Attendance	Source
September 8	at Vermont	Centennial Field; Burlington, VT	W 14–0	7,000–7,500	
September 15	Boston University	Alumni Field; Orono, ME	L 13–16	4,707	
September 22	at UMass	Alumni Stadium; Hadley, MA	L 0–20	11,800	
September 29	Central Connecticut*	Alumni Field; Orono, ME	L 3–6	8,063	
October 6	at Rhode Island	Meade Stadium; Kingston, RI	W 20–7	5,000	
October 16	New Hampshire	Alumni Field; Orono, ME	L 0–13	8,500	
October 20	Connecticut	Alumni Field; Orono, ME	L 3–30	2,000–4,000	
October 27	at Lafayette*	Fisher Field; Easton, PA	L 13–23	4,000	
November 3	Bucknell*	Alumni Field; Orono, ME	W 14–0	1,800–2,000	
November 10	No. 14 Delaware*	Alumni Field; Orono, ME	L 12–28	2,200	
*Non-conference game; Rankings from AP Poll released prior to the game
