= Robert Casciola =

American football player and coach

Biographical details
- Born: c. 1935

Playing career
- 1955–1957: Princeton
- Position: Tackle

Coaching career (HC unless noted)
- 1958–1960: Princeton (freshmen)
- 1961–1965: Princeton (assistant)
- 1966–1968: Dartmouth (DE/LB)
- 1969–1970: Connecticut (def. assistant)
- 1971–1972: Connecticut
- 1973–1977: Princeton

Administrative career (AD unless noted)
- 1987–1991: New Jersey Nets (EVP/COO)

Head coaching record
- Overall: 23–38–2

Accomplishments and honors

Championships
- Yankee (1971)

Awards
- Second-team All-Eastern (1957); Third-team All-Eastern (1956)

Robert F. Casciola (born c. 1935) is an American former college football coach, National Basketball Association executive, banking executive, and broadcaster. He was the head coach at the University of Connecticut from 1971 to 1972 and at Princeton University from 1973 to 1977. He held assistant coaching positions at Princeton and, Dartmouth College. Casciola served as an executive vice president and the chief operating officer for the New Jersey Nets of the NBA from 1987 to 1991. He joined the National Football Foundation & College Hall of Fame in 1991 as executive director. He became president in 1996, serving in the role until his retirement in 2005. He played college football at Princeton as a tackle.

== Early life ==
A native of New Hyde Park, New York, Casciola attended Mineola High School in Garden City Park. He attended college at Princeton University, where he played on the football team from 1955 to 1957. He was named to the All-Ivy League team in 1957. He graduated in 1958.

== Coaching career ==
After graduation, Casciola spent three years as the freshmen coach at his alma mater. He then joined the Princeton varsity coaching staff, where remained through the 1965 season. Casciola also served as an officer in the United States Army and attained the rank of captain before being discharged in 1965. From 1966 to 1969, he spent three years mentoring the defensive ends and linebackers at Dartmouth under head coach Bob Blackman. From 1969 to 1970, he served as the defensive coach at Connecticut. In December 1970, he was promoted to head coach in place of John Toner, who remained at UConn as athletic director. Casciola led UConn to a 5–3–1 record in his first season and a share of the Atlantic 10 Conference championship. After one additional season at UConn, he amassed a record of 9–8–1 during his tenure.

In March 1973, Princeton appointed Casciola as its head coach and continued through 1977.

== After coaching ==
In June 1978, Casciola became the assistant vice president for government banking at the First National State Bank of New Jersey (later known as the First Fidelity Bank of New Jersey). In 1979, he served as a member of the Garden State Bowl committee. In 1981, he led a football camp for high school quarterbacks and wide receivers at Mercer University in Atlanta. He worked as a color analyst for Princeton football broadcasts starting in 1981, and later also announced for the New Jersey Generals, Rutgers University athletics, and Ivy League athletics.

In 1987, he left his position with the First Fidelity Bank of New Jersey to take over as executive vice president and chief operating officer for the New Jersey Nets of the National Basketball Association. Casciola held that post for five years. In July 1991, Casciola resigned from the Nets to become the executive director of the National Football Foundation and College Football Hall of Fame.

Casciola has four children with his wife, Janet.

== Head coaching record ==
Year	Team	Overall	Conference	Standing	Bowl/playoffs
Connecticut Huskies (Yankee Conference) (1971–1972)
1971	Connecticut	5–3–1	4–1–1	T–1st	
1972	Connecticut	4–5	4–1	2nd	
Connecticut:		9–8–1	8–2		
Princeton Tigers (Ivy League) (1973–1977)
1973	Princeton	1–8	0–7	8th	
1974	Princeton	4–4–1	3–4	T–5th	
1975	Princeton	4–5	3–4	5th	
1976	Princeton	2–7	2–5	T–5th	
1977	Princeton	3–6	3–4	6th	
Princeton:		14–30–1	11–24		
Total:		23–38–2			
National championship Conference title Conference division title or championship game berth
