= Mayor's Cup (Temple–Villanova) =

American football match in Pennsylvania

- Temple Owls Villanova Wildcats
- Sport: Football
- First meeting: Unknown, 1908; Villanova 12, Temple 0
- Latest meeting: September 1, 2018; Villanova 19, Temple 17
- Trophy: Mayor's Cup

Statistics
- Total meetings: 35
- All-time series: Villanova Leads, 17–16–2
- Largest victory: Temple, 41–3 (1975)
- Longest win streak: Temple, 4 (1972–75, 2010–17)
- Current win streak: Villanova, 1 (2018–present)

Locations in the Greater Philadelphia Area

The Mayor's Cup is the rivalry between the Temple Owls and the Villanova Wildcats. The two schools are located 15 miles apart from each other in the Philadelphia, Pennsylvania area. The two teams have met 35 times on the football field, Villanova leads the series 17–16–2.

== Game results ==
Temple victories	Villanova victories	Tie games

No.	Date	Location	Winner	Score
1	Unknown, 1908	Unknown	Villanova	12–0
2	November 10, 1928	Philadelphia, PA	Tie	0–0
3	November 30, 1929	Philadelphia, PA	Villanova	15–0
4	October 25, 1930	Philadelphia, PA	Villanova	8–7
5	November 7, 1931	Philadelphia, PA	Temple	13–7
6	November 19, 1932	Philadelphia, PA	Villanova	7–0
7	November 25, 1933	Philadelphia, PA	Villanova	24–0
8	November 24, 1934	Philadelphia, PA	Temple	22–0
9	November 23, 1935	Philadelphia, PA	Villanova	21–14
10	November 14, 1936	Philadelphia, PA	#19 Temple	6–0
11	November 20, 1937	Philadelphia, PA	#10 Villanova	33–0
12	November 12, 1938	Philadelphia, PA	#19 Villanova	20–7
13	November 18, 1939	Philadelphia, PA	Villanova	12–6
14	November 9, 1940	Philadelphia, PA	Temple	28–0
15	November 8, 1941	Philadelphia, PA	Temple	14–13
16	November 28, 1942	Philadelphia, PA	Villanova	20–7
17	November 20, 1943	Philadelphia, PA	Villanova	34–7
18	November 26, 1970	Philadelphia, PA	Villanova	31–26

No.	Date	Location	Winner	Score
19	November 20, 1971	Philadelphia, PA	Tie	13–13
20	November 18, 1972	Villanova, PA	Temple	12–10
21	November 24, 1973	Villanova, PA	Temple	34–0
22	November 23, 1974	Philadelphia, PA	Temple	17–7
23	November 29, 1975	Philadelphia, PA	Temple	41–3
24	November 20, 1976	Philadelphia, PA	Villanova	24–7
25	November 19, 1977	Villanova, PA	Temple	38–15
26	November 18, 1978	Philadelphia, PA	Temple	27–17
27	November 24, 1979	Villanova, PA	Temple	42–10
28	November 22, 1980	Villanova, PA	Villanova	23–7
29	September 6, 2003	Philadelphia, PA	Villanova	23–20^{2OT}
30	September 3, 2009	Philadelphia, PA	Villanova	27–24
31	September 3, 2010	Philadelphia, PA	Temple	31–24
32	September 1, 2011	Philadelphia, PA	Temple	42–7
33	August 31, 2012	Philadelphia, PA	Temple	41–10
34	September 9, 2017	Philadelphia, PA	Temple	16–13
35	September 1, 2018	Philadelphia, PA	Villanova	19–17
Series: Villanova leads 17–16–2

== See also ==
- List of NCAA college football rivalry games
