= Rutgers Stadium (1938) =

Stadium in New Jersey, USA

- Interactive map of Rutgers Stadium
- Full name: Rutgers Stadium
- Location: Piscataway Township, New Jersey, U.S.
- Coordinates: 40°30′49″N 74°27′55″W
- Owner: Rutgers University
- Operator: Rutgers University
- Capacity: 31,219

Construction
- Opened: 1938
- Closed: 1993

Tenant
- Rutgers Scarlet Knights football (1938–1992)

Rutgers Stadium was a stadium in Piscataway Township, New Jersey. It hosted the Rutgers University Scarlet Knights football team until the school built the new Rutgers Stadium in 1994. The stadium held 31,219 people at its peak and was opened in 1938. It also hosted the NCAA Men's Lacrosse Championship on five occasions.

Preceded by Francis Field; Bill Armstrong Stadium	Host of the College Cup; 1963; 1989	Succeeded by Brown Stadium; USF Soccer Stadium
