= 1973 Cincinnati Bearcats football team =

American college football season

1973 Cincinnati Bearcats football
- Conference: Independent
- Record: 4–7
- Head coach: Tony Mason (1st season)
- Captain: Evan Jolitz
- Home stadium: Nippert Stadium

1973 NCAA Division I independents football records
	Conf.			Overall
Team	W	L	T	W		L		T
No. 1 Notre Dame		–		11	–	0	–	0
No. 5 Penn State		–		12	–	0	–	0
No. 9 Houston		–		11	–	1	–	0
Temple		–		9	–	1	–	0
No. 20 Tulane		–		9	–	3	–	0
Memphis State		–		8	–	3	–	0
Tampa		–		8	–	3	–	0
Boston College		–		7	–	4	–	0
South Carolina		–		7	–	4	–	0
Utah State		–		7	–	4	–	0
Air Force		–		6	–	4	–	0
Southern Miss		–		6	–	4	–	1
Northern Illinois		–		6	–	5	–	0
Rutgers		–		6	–	5	–	0
West Virginia		–		6	–	5	–	0
Pittsburgh		–		6	–	5	–	1
Colgate		–		5	–	5	–	0
Dayton		–		5	–	5	–	1
Xavier		–		5	–	5	–	1
Georgia Tech		–		5	–	6	–	0
Holy Cross		–		5	–	6	–	0
Miami (FL)		–		5	–	6	–	0
Cincinnati		–		4	–	7	–	0
Marshall		–		4	–	7	–	0
Navy		–		4	–	7	–	0
Southern Illinois		–		3	–	7	–	1
Villanova		–		3	–	8	–	0
Syracuse		–		2	–	9	–	0
Virginia Tech		–		2	–	9	–	0
Army		–		0	–	10	–	0
Florida State		–		0	–	11	–	0
Rankings from AP Poll

The 1973 Cincinnati Bearcats football team represented the University of Cincinnati as an independent during 1973 NCAA Division I football season. Led by first-year head coach Tony Mason, the Bearcats compiled a record of 4–7. The team played home games at Nippert Stadium in Cincinnati.

== Schedule ==
Date	Time	Opponent	Site	Result	Attendance	Source
September 15	1:31 p.m.	Xavier	Nippert Stadium; Cincinnati, OH (rivalry)	W 40–7	10,153	
September 22	1:34 p.m.	at Villanova	Villanova Stadium; Villanova, PA	L 7–14	11,500	
September 29	8:30 p.m.	at Tulsa	Skelly Stadium; Tulsa, OK	L 13–16	24,000	
October 6	7:30 p.m.	at Temple	Temple Stadium; Philadelphia, PA	L 15–16	9,471	
October 13	8:01 p.m.	Southwestern Louisiana	Nippert Stadium; Cincinnati, OH	W 27–0	6,341	
October 20	1:31 p.m.	Wichita State	Nippert Stadium; Cincinnati, OH	W 27–6	8,680	
October 27	8:01 p.m.	at Louisville	Fairgrounds Stadium; Louisville, KY (rivalry)	L 8–10	14,922	
November 3	2:01 p.m.	North Texas State	Nippert Stadium; Cincinnati, OH	W 52–3	13,449	
November 10	1:30 p.m.	at Ohio	Peden Stadium; Athens, OH	L 8–14	13,400	
November 17		at No. 17 Miami (OH)	Miami Field; Oxford, OH (Victory Bell)	L 0–6	13,058	
November 24	1:31 p.m.	Memphis State	Nippert Stadium; Cincinnati, OH (rivalry)	L 13–17	3,215	
Rankings from AP Poll released prior to the game; All times are in Eastern time

== Roster ==
1973 Cincinnati Bearcats football team roster
Players
Coaches
Offense

Pos.	#	Name	Class
RB	6	Santo Atkinson	Jr
QB	12	Mike Campbell	Jr
RB	30	Jim Hixonbaugh	So
G	61	Tom Forrest	Sr
RB	33	Reggie Harrison	Sr
TE	82	Jeff West	Jr

Defense

Pos.	#	Name	Class
LB	68	Evan Jolitz	Sr
DT	79	Ted Koppenhoefer	So
DB	5	Tom Marvaso	Jr
DE	90	Clarence Sanders	So
LB	25	Bill Vorderbrueggen	So

Special teams

Pos.	#	Name	Class

Head coach

- Tony Mason

Coordinators/assistant coaches

Legend

- (C) Team captain
- (S) Suspended
- (I) Ineligible
- Injured
- Redshirt

== Game films ==
- 1973 Cincinnati - Miami (Oh) Football Game Film, Reel 1
- 1973 Cincinnati - Miami (Oh) Football Game Film, Reel 2
- 1973 Cincinnati - Miami (Oh) Football Game Film, Reel 3
- 1973 Cincinnati - Miami (Oh) Football Game Film, Reel 4
