= 1973 Florida State Seminoles football team =

American college football season

1973 Florida State Seminoles football
- Conference: Independent
- Record: 0–11
- Head coach: Larry Jones (3rd season)
- Captains: Jim Malkiewicz; Don Sparkman
- Home stadium: Doak Campbell Stadium

1973 NCAA Division I independents football records
	Conf.			Overall
Team	W	L	T	W		L		T
No. 1 Notre Dame		–		11	–	0	–	0
No. 5 Penn State		–		12	–	0	–	0
No. 9 Houston		–		11	–	1	–	0
Temple		–		9	–	1	–	0
No. 20 Tulane		–		9	–	3	–	0
Memphis State		–		8	–	3	–	0
Tampa		–		8	–	3	–	0
Boston College		–		7	–	4	–	0
South Carolina		–		7	–	4	–	0
Utah State		–		7	–	4	–	0
Air Force		–		6	–	4	–	0
Southern Miss		–		6	–	4	–	1
Northern Illinois		–		6	–	5	–	0
Rutgers		–		6	–	5	–	0
West Virginia		–		6	–	5	–	0
Pittsburgh		–		6	–	5	–	1
Colgate		–		5	–	5	–	0
Dayton		–		5	–	5	–	1
Xavier		–		5	–	5	–	1
Georgia Tech		–		5	–	6	–	0
Holy Cross		–		5	–	6	–	0
Miami (FL)		–		5	–	6	–	0
Cincinnati		–		4	–	7	–	0
Marshall		–		4	–	7	–	0
Navy		–		4	–	7	–	0
Southern Illinois		–		3	–	7	–	1
Villanova		–		3	–	8	–	0
Syracuse		–		2	–	9	–	0
Virginia Tech		–		2	–	9	–	0
Army		–		0	–	10	–	0
Florida State		–		0	–	11	–	0
Rankings from AP Poll

The 1973 Florida State Seminoles football team represented Florida State University as an independent during the 1973 NCAA Division I football season. Led by head coach Larry Jones the Seminoles finished the season winless with a record of 0–11.

== Schedule ==
Date	Time	Opponent	Site	Result	Attendance	Source
September 15		at Wake Forest	Groves Stadium; Winston-Salem, NC	L 7–9	18,000	
September 22		Kansas	Doak Campbell Stadium; Tallahassee, FL	L 0–28	19,240	
September 29	4:00 p.m.	No. 18 Miami (FL)	Doak Campbell Stadium; Tallahassee, FL (rivalry)	L 10–14	22,278	
October 6		at Baylor	Baylor Stadium; Waco, TX	L 14–21	22,000	
October 13		Mississippi State	Doak Campbell Stadium; Tallahassee, FL	L 12–37	19,829	
October 20	2:01 p.m.	Memphis State	Doak Campbell Stadium; Tallahassee, FL	L 10–13	23,883	
October 27		at San Diego State	San Diego Stadium; San Diego, CA	L 17–38	26,492	
November 3		at No. 18 Houston	Houston Astrodome; Houston, Texas	L 3–34	27,587	
November 10		at Virginia Tech	Lane Stadium; Blacksburg, VA	L 13–36	25,000	
November 17		South Carolina	Doak Campbell Stadium; Tallahassee, FL	L 12–52	17,778	
December 1		at Florida	Florida Field; Gainesville, FL (rivalry)	L 0–49	62,273	
Rankings from AP Poll released prior to the game; All times are in Eastern time

== Game summaries ==
=== Miami (FL) ===
Miami (FL) Hurricanes at Florida State Seminoles

Quarter	1	2	3	4	Total
Miami (FL)	0	7	0	7	14
Florida St	0	3	7	0	10

at Doak Campbell Stadium, Tallahassee, Florida

- Date: September 29
- Game attendance: 22,278

Game information

First quarter

- No scoring

Second quarter

- FSU – Ahmet Askin 51-yard field goal, 6:40. Florida St 3–0.
- MIA – Coy Hall 1-yard run (kick good), 0:10. Miami (FL) 7–3.

Third quarter

- FSU – Hodges Mitchell 1-yard run (Ahmet Askin kick), 3:22. Florida St 10–7. Drive: 12 plays, 60 yards.

Fourth quarter

- MIA – Woody Thompson 4-yard run (kick good), 6:24. Miami (FL) 14–10. Drive: 72 yards.

Top passers

- MIA
- FSU – Billy Sexton – 7/14, 61 yards

Top rushers

- MIA – Woody Thompson – 24 rushes, 119 yards
- FSU – Bobby McKinnon – 13 rushes, 27 yards

Top receivers

- MIA
- FSU – Joe Goldsmith – 2 receptions, 23 yards

=== At Florida ===
Florida State Seminoles (0–10) at Florida Gators (6–4)

Quarter	1	2	3	4	Total
Florida St	0	0	0	0	0
Florida	14	14	7	14	49

at Florida Field, Gainesville, Florida

- Date: December 1
- Game time: 2:00 p.m. EST
- Game weather: Sunny
- Game attendance: 62,273
- Recap/Box

Game information

First quarter

- FLA – Nat Moore 1-yard run (kick good), 11:51. Florida 7–0. Drive: 54 yards.
- FLA – Nat Moore 5-yard run (kick good), 2:37. Florida 14–0.

Second quarter

- FLA – James Richards 62-yard run (kick good), 14:47. Florida 21–0.
- FLA – Vince Kendrick 1-yard run (kick good), 6:46. Florida 28–0.

Third quarter

- FLA – Lee McGriff 31-yard pass from Don Gaffney (kick good), 5:38. Florida 35–0.

Fourth quarter

- FLA – Severs 2-yard pass from Chan Gailey (kick good), 4:49. FLorida 42–0.
- FLA – Larry Brinson 12-yard run (kick good), 0:00. Florida 49–0.

Top passers

- FSU – Billy Prescott – 5/21, 70 yards, INT
- FLA – Don Gaffney – 6/12, TD

Top rushers

- FSU – Hodges Mitchell – 15 rushes, 74 yards
- FLA – James Richards – 7 rushes, 81 yards, 2 TD

Top receivers

- FSU – Mike Allen – 2 receptions, 32 yards
- FLA – Lee McGriff/Hank Foldberg – 3 receptions

== Roster ==
1973 Florida State Seminoles football team roster
Players
Coaches
Offense

Pos.	#	Name	Class
WR		Mike Allen
OL		Bob Anderson
TE		Rocky Blythe
TE		Ed Davis
RB		Mike Davison
OL		Bobby Elam
WR		Jim Everett
OL		Jeff Gardner
WR		Joe Goldsmith
OL		Bob Jones
RB		Bobby McKinnon
RB		Hodges Mitchell	Sr
QB		Mark Orlando
QB		Billy Prescott	Fr
OL		Smokey Ragins
OL		Rocky Saldana
QB		Billy Sexton
WR		Mike Shumann
OL		Don Sparkman
WR		Joe Thomas

Defense

Pos.	#	Name	Class
LB		Phil Arnold
LB		Bruce Bell
DL		Steve Bratton
DB		Phil Cahoon
DL		Tom Chandler
DL		Randy Coffield
DB		Chad Griffin
DB		Earl Humes
DB		Randy Kaiser
CB		Buzzy Lewis
DL		John Malkiewicz
DL		Scott Meseroll
LB		John Murphy
LB		Greg Pounds
LB		Detroit Reynolds
DB		Andy Stockton

Special teams

Pos.	#	Name	Class
K		Ahmet Askin
P		Joe Downey

Head coach

- Larry Jones

Coordinators/assistant coaches

- Gene Henderson
  Defensive coordinator
- Dick Hopkins
  Student assistant

Legend

- (C) Team captain
- (S) Suspended
- (I) Ineligible
- Injured
- Redshirt
