= 1973 South Carolina Gamecocks football team =

American college football season

1973 South Carolina Gamecocks football
- Conference: Independent
- Record: 7–4
- Head coach: Paul Dietzel (8th season)
- Captains: Dana Carpenter; Darrell Austin
- Home stadium: Williams–Brice Stadium

1973 NCAA Division I independents football records
	Conf.			Overall
Team	W	L	T	W		L		T
No. 1 Notre Dame		–		11	–	0	–	0
No. 5 Penn State		–		12	–	0	–	0
No. 9 Houston		–		11	–	1	–	0
Temple		–		9	–	1	–	0
No. 20 Tulane		–		9	–	3	–	0
Memphis State		–		8	–	3	–	0
Tampa		–		8	–	3	–	0
Boston College		–		7	–	4	–	0
South Carolina		–		7	–	4	–	0
Utah State		–		7	–	4	–	0
Air Force		–		6	–	4	–	0
Southern Miss		–		6	–	4	–	1
Northern Illinois		–		6	–	5	–	0
Rutgers		–		6	–	5	–	0
West Virginia		–		6	–	5	–	0
Pittsburgh		–		6	–	5	–	1
Colgate		–		5	–	5	–	0
Dayton		–		5	–	5	–	1
Xavier		–		5	–	5	–	1
Georgia Tech		–		5	–	6	–	0
Holy Cross		–		5	–	6	–	0
Miami (FL)		–		5	–	6	–	0
Cincinnati		–		4	–	7	–	0
Marshall		–		4	–	7	–	0
Navy		–		4	–	7	–	0
Southern Illinois		–		3	–	7	–	1
Villanova		–		3	–	8	–	0
Syracuse		–		2	–	9	–	0
Virginia Tech		–		2	–	9	–	0
Army		–		0	–	10	–	0
Florida State		–		0	–	11	–	0
Rankings from AP Poll

The 1973 South Carolina Gamecocks football team represented the University of South Carolina as an independent during the 1973 NCAA Division I football season. Led by eighth-year head coach Paul Dietzel, the Gamecocks compiled a record of 7–4. The team played home games at Williams–Brice Stadium in Columbia, South Carolina.

== Schedule ==
Date	Time	Opponent	Site	Result	Attendance	Source
September 15		Georgia Tech	Williams–Brice Stadium; Columbia, SC	W 41–28	51,584	
September 21		at No. 16 Houston	Houston Astrodome; Houston, TX	L 19–27	24,019	
September 29	7:30 p.m.	Miami (OH)	Williams–Brice Stadium; Columbia, SC	L 11–13	41,606	
October 6		at Virginia Tech	Lane Stadium; Blacksburg, VA	W 27–24	38,000	
October 13		at Wake Forest	Groves Stadium; Winston-Salem, NC	W 28–12	21,200	
October 20	7:31 p.m.	Ohio	Williams–Brice Stadium; Columbia, SC	W 38–22	39,021	
October 27		No. 9 LSU	Williams–Brice Stadium; Columbia, SC	L 29–33	51,039	
November 3		NC State	Williams–Brice Stadium; Columbia, SC	L 35–56	52,320	
November 10		Appalachian State	Williams–Brice Stadium; Columbia, SC	W 35–14	33,705	
November 17		at Florida State	Doak Campbell Stadium; Tallahassee, FL	W 52–12	17,778	
November 24		Clemson	Williams–Brice Stadium; Columbia, SC (rivalry)	W 32–20	55,615	
Rankings from AP Poll released prior to the game

== Roster ==
1973 South Carolina Gamecocks football team roster
Players
Coaches
Offense

Pos.	#	Name	Class
G	64	Rick Anthony	Sr
OT	70	Darrell Austin	Sr
TE	91	Steve Blackmon	Jr
OT	71	Jim Burke	Jr
OT	73	Dave Cash	Sr
WR	24	Jim Collins	So
OT	75	Dale Duncan	Jr
WR	88	Mike Farrell	Jr
QB	12	Jeff Grantz	So
WR	40	Eddie Muldrow	Jr
C	51	Jim Privette	Sr
QB	14	Lyn Rushing	Sr
TE	89	Jay Saldi	So
OT	59	E. Z. Smith	So
G	50	Joe Smith	So
TE	84	Stevie Stephens	So
WR	83	Scott Thomas	So
C	72	Buck Thompson	Jr
G	65	Jerry Witherspoon	Jr
TE	16	Marty Woolbright	Sr
RB	43	Tom Zipperly	Jr

Defense

Pos.	#	Name	Class
DB	21	Mel Baxley	Sr
DT	85	Jim Bread	Sr
DT	55	Dana Carpenter	Sr
LB	34	Bill Cregar	Jr
DB	7	Henry Laws	So
DT	76	Andy Levantis	Jr
DT	81	Monty Matthews	Jr
LB	61	Gary McLaren	Jr
LB	36	Garry Mott	So
DE	82	Grahl Phillips	So
DE	49	Bob Roe	Sr
DB	22	Thad Rowe	Sr
LB	45	Stan Thomas	So
DT	69	Roger Toy	Sr
LB	25	Phil Wallace	Sr
DB	3	C. A. Wilson	Jr
DE	87	Richard Wood	Jr

Special teams

Pos.	#	Name	Class
K	1	Bobby Marino	So
P	4	Robby Reymolds	Sr

Head coach

- Paul Dietzel

Coordinators/assistant coaches

Legend

- (C) Team captain
- (S) Suspended
- (I) Ineligible
- Injured
- Redshirt
