= 1973 Georgia Tech Yellow Jackets football team =

American college football season

1973 Georgia Tech Yellow Jackets football
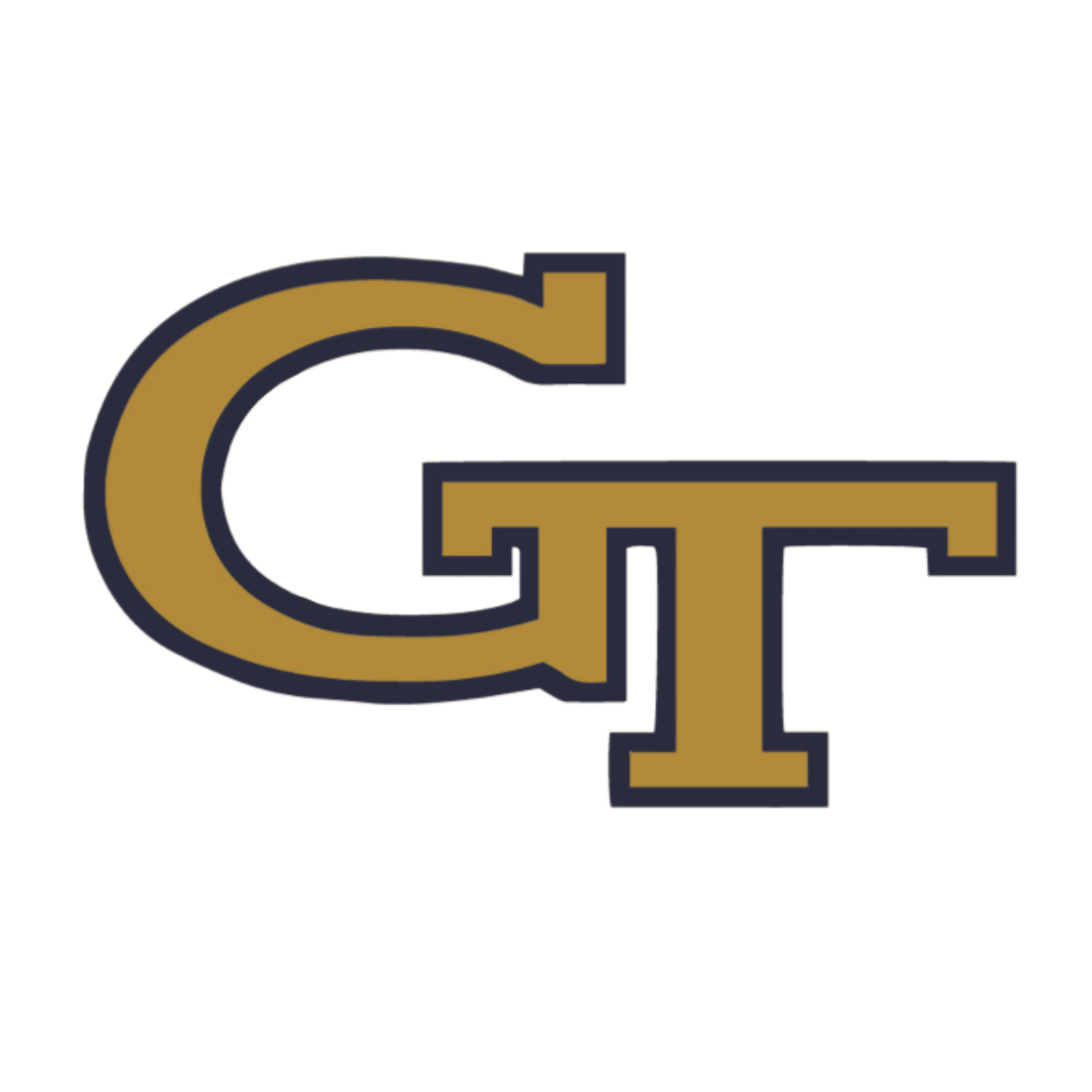
- Conference: Independent
- Record: 5–6
- Head coach: Bill Fulcher (2nd season)
- Offensive coordinator: Bill Pace (1st season)
- Captains: Jim Owings; Steve Putnal
- Home stadium: Grant Field

1973 NCAA Division I independents football records
	Conf.			Overall
Team	W	L	T	W		L		T
No. 1 Notre Dame		–		11	–	0	–	0
No. 5 Penn State		–		12	–	0	–	0
No. 9 Houston		–		11	–	1	–	0
Temple		–		9	–	1	–	0
No. 20 Tulane		–		9	–	3	–	0
Memphis State		–		8	–	3	–	0
Tampa		–		8	–	3	–	0
Boston College		–		7	–	4	–	0
South Carolina		–		7	–	4	–	0
Utah State		–		7	–	4	–	0
Air Force		–		6	–	4	–	0
Southern Miss		–		6	–	4	–	1
Northern Illinois		–		6	–	5	–	0
Rutgers		–		6	–	5	–	0
West Virginia		–		6	–	5	–	0
Pittsburgh		–		6	–	5	–	1
Colgate		–		5	–	5	–	0
Dayton		–		5	–	5	–	1
Xavier		–		5	–	5	–	1
Georgia Tech		–		5	–	6	–	0
Holy Cross		–		5	–	6	–	0
Miami (FL)		–		5	–	6	–	0
Cincinnati		–		4	–	7	–	0
Marshall		–		4	–	7	–	0
Navy		–		4	–	7	–	0
Southern Illinois		–		3	–	7	–	1
Villanova		–		3	–	8	–	0
Syracuse		–		2	–	9	–	0
Virginia Tech		–		2	–	9	–	0
Army		–		0	–	10	–	0
Florida State		–		0	–	11	–	0
Rankings from AP Poll

The 1973 Georgia Tech Yellow Jackets football team represented the Georgia Institute of Technology as an independent during the 1973 NCAA Division I football season. The Yellow Jackets were led by head coach Bill Fulcher, in his second and final year with the team, and played their home games at Grant Field in Atlanta. Fulcher resigned as head coach at the end of the season, claiming that he simply didn't enjoy the job.

== Schedule ==
Date	Time	Opponent	Site	Result	Attendance	Source
September 15		at South Carolina	Williams–Brice Stadium; Columbia, SC	L 28–41	51,584	
September 22		No. 1 USC	Grant Field; Atlanta, GA	L 6–23	58,228	
September 29		Clemson	Grant Field; Atlanta, GA (rivalry)	W 29–21	48,062	
October 6	2:00 p.m.	Army	Grant Field; Atlanta, GA	W 14–10	50,111	
October 13		at No. 8 Tennessee	Neyland Stadium; Knoxville, TN (rivalry)	L 14–20	70,616	
October 20		Auburn	Grant Field; Atlanta, GA (rivalry)	L 10–24	59,123	
October 27		at No. 15 Tulane	Tulane Stadium; New Orleans, LA	L 14–23	66,286	
November 3		Duke^{†}	Grant Field; Atlanta, GA	W 12–10	47,129	
November 10		VMI	Grant Field; Atlanta, GA	W 36–7	38,112	
November 17	8:00 p.m.	vs. Navy	Gator Bowl Stadium; Jacksonville, FL	W 26–22	26,235	
December 1		Georgia	Grant Field; Atlanta, GA (Clean, Old-Fashioned Hate)	L 3–10	60,316‡	
^{†}Homecoming; Rankings from AP Poll released prior to the game; All times are in Eastern time

‡Bobby Dodd Stadium (then known as Grant Field) attendance record.
