= 1973 Southern Illinois Salukis football team =

American college football season

1973 Southern Illinois Salukis football
- Conference: Independent
- Record: 3–7–1
- Head coach: Dick Towers (7th season)
- Home stadium: McAndrew Stadium

1973 NCAA Division I independents football records
	Conf.			Overall
Team	W	L	T	W		L		T
No. 1 Notre Dame		–		11	–	0	–	0
No. 5 Penn State		–		12	–	0	–	0
No. 9 Houston		–		11	–	1	–	0
Temple		–		9	–	1	–	0
No. 20 Tulane		–		9	–	3	–	0
Memphis State		–		8	–	3	–	0
Tampa		–		8	–	3	–	0
Boston College		–		7	–	4	–	0
South Carolina		–		7	–	4	–	0
Utah State		–		7	–	4	–	0
Air Force		–		6	–	4	–	0
Southern Miss		–		6	–	4	–	1
Northern Illinois		–		6	–	5	–	0
Rutgers		–		6	–	5	–	0
West Virginia		–		6	–	5	–	0
Pittsburgh		–		6	–	5	–	1
Colgate		–		5	–	5	–	0
Dayton		–		5	–	5	–	1
Xavier		–		5	–	5	–	1
Georgia Tech		–		5	–	6	–	0
Holy Cross		–		5	–	6	–	0
Miami (FL)		–		5	–	6	–	0
Cincinnati		–		4	–	7	–	0
Marshall		–		4	–	7	–	0
Navy		–		4	–	7	–	0
Southern Illinois		–		3	–	7	–	1
Villanova		–		3	–	8	–	0
Syracuse		–		2	–	9	–	0
Virginia Tech		–		2	–	9	–	0
Army		–		0	–	10	–	0
Florida State		–		0	–	11	–	0
Rankings from AP Poll

The 1973 Southern Illinois Salukis football team was an American football team that represented Southern Illinois University (now known as Southern Illinois University Carbondale) as an independent during the 1973 NCAA Division I football season. Under seventh-year head coach Dick Towers, the team compiled a 3–7–1 record. The team played its home games at McAndrew Stadium in Carbondale, Illinois.

== Schedule ==
Date	Time	Opponent	Site	Result	Attendance	Source
September 15	1:33 p.m.	at Northern Illinois	Huskie Stadium; DeKalb, IL	L 27–34	10,000	
September 22	7:30 p.m.	East Carolina	McAndrew Stadium; Carbondale, IL	L 25–42	6,500–9,500	
September 29	1:30 p.m.	at No. 12 Oklahoma State	Lewis Field; Stillwater, OK	L 7–70	33,000	
October 6	6:30 p.m.	at Dayton	Baujan Field; Dayton, OH	L 19–23	7,881	
October 13		Xavier	McAndrew Stadium; Carbondale, IL	W 73–7	8,500	
October 20	7:30 p.m.	Tampa	McAndrew Stadium; Carbondale, IL	L 23–25	9,000	
October 27	1:31 p.m.	Akron	McAndrew Stadium; Carbondale, IL	W 14–13	11,000	
November 3	12:30 p.m.	at Ball State	Ball State Stadium; Muncie, IN	T 16–16	10,160	
November 10	1:30 p.m.	Drake	McAndrew Stadium; Carbondale, IL	W 37–20	6,500	
November 17	1:00 p.m.	at Indiana State	Memorial Stadium; Terre Haute, IN	L 17–36	5,000	
November 24	1:30 p.m.	at Illinois State	Hancock Stadium; Normal, IL	L 8–10	4,000	
Rankings from AP Poll released prior to the game; All times are in Central time
