= 1973 Army Cadets football team =

American college football season

1973 Army Cadets football
- Conference: Independent
- Record: 0–10
- Head coach: Tom Cahill (8th season)
- Captains: Jim Ward; Skip Whitman
- Home stadium: Michie Stadium

1973 NCAA Division I independents football records
| | Conf. | | | Overall |
| Team | W | L | T | W | | L | | T |
|---|---|---|---|---|---|---|---|---|
| No. 1 Notre Dame | | – | | 11 | – | 0 | – | 0 |
| No. 5 Penn State | | – | | 12 | – | 0 | – | 0 |
| No. 9 Houston | | – | | 11 | – | 1 | – | 0 |
| Temple | | – | | 9 | – | 1 | – | 0 |
| No. 20 Tulane | | – | | 9 | – | 3 | – | 0 |
| Memphis State | | – | | 8 | – | 3 | – | 0 |
| Tampa | | – | | 8 | – | 3 | – | 0 |
| Boston College | | – | | 7 | – | 4 | – | 0 |
| South Carolina | | – | | 7 | – | 4 | – | 0 |
| Utah State | | – | | 7 | – | 4 | – | 0 |
| Air Force | | – | | 6 | – | 4 | – | 0 |
| Southern Miss | | – | | 6 | – | 4 | – | 1 |
| Northern Illinois | | – | | 6 | – | 5 | – | 0 |
| Rutgers | | – | | 6 | – | 5 | – | 0 |
| West Virginia | | – | | 6 | – | 5 | – | 0 |
| Pittsburgh | | – | | 6 | – | 5 | – | 1 |
| Colgate | | – | | 5 | – | 5 | – | 0 |
| Dayton | | – | | 5 | – | 5 | – | 1 |
| Xavier | | – | | 5 | – | 5 | – | 1 |
| Georgia Tech | | – | | 5 | – | 6 | – | 0 |
| Holy Cross | | – | | 5 | – | 6 | – | 0 |
| Miami (FL) | | – | | 5 | – | 6 | – | 0 |
| Cincinnati | | – | | 4 | – | 7 | – | 0 |
| Marshall | | – | | 4 | – | 7 | – | 0 |
| Navy | | – | | 4 | – | 7 | – | 0 |
| Southern Illinois | | – | | 3 | – | 7 | – | 1 |
| Villanova | | – | | 3 | – | 8 | – | 0 |
| Syracuse | | – | | 2 | – | 9 | – | 0 |
| Virginia Tech | | – | | 2 | – | 9 | – | 0 |
| Army | | – | | 0 | – | 10 | – | 0 |
| Florida State | | – | | 0 | – | 11 | – | 0 |
Rankings from AP Poll

The 1973 Army Cadets football team represented the United States Military Academy as an independent during the 1973 NCAA Division I football season. In their eighth and final year under head coach Tom Cahill, the Cadets compiled an 0–10 record and were outscored by their opponents by a combined total of 382 to 67. In the annual Army–Navy Game, the Cadets lost to the Midshipmen by a 53 to 0 score and also lost to Notre Dame by a 62 to 3 score.

No Army players were selected as first-team players on the 1973 College Football All-America Team.

== Schedule ==
| Date | Time | Opponent | Site | Result | Attendance | Source |
|---|---|---|---|---|---|---|
| September 22 | 2:00 p.m. | No. 10 Tennessee | Michie Stadium; West Point, NY | L 18–37 | 39,942 | |
| September 29 | 2:00 p.m. | California | Michie Stadium; West Point, NY | L 6–51 | 40,982 | |
| October 6 | 2:00 p.m. | at Georgia Tech | Grant Field; Atlanta, GA | L 10–14 | 50,111 | |
| October 13 | 1:30 p.m. | at No. 7 Penn State | Beaver Stadium; University Park, PA | L 3–54 | 58,194 | |
| October 20 | 2:00 p.m. | No. 11 Notre Dame | Michie Stadium; West Point, NY (rivalry) | L 3–62 | 42,503 | |
| October 27 | 2:00 p.m. | Holy Cross | Michie Stadium; West Point, NY | L 10–17 | 42,257 | |
| November 3 | 3:01 p.m. | at Air Force | Falcon Stadium; Colorado Springs, CO (Commander-in-Chief's Trophy) | L 10–43 | 41,542 | |
| November 10 | 1:30 p.m. | Miami (FL) | Michie Stadium; West Point, NY | L 7–19 | 41,047 | |
| November 17 | 1:30 p.m. | Pittsburgh | Michie Stadium; West Point, NY | L 0–34 | 33,264 | |
| December 1 | 1:30 p.m. | vs. Navy | John F. Kennedy Stadium; Philadelphia, PA (Army–Navy Game) | L 0–51 | 91,926 | |
Rankings from AP Poll released prior to the game; All times are in Eastern time

== Game summaries ==
=== Penn State ===
Penn State defeated Army 54–3 on October 13, 1973, at Beaver Stadium in University Park, Pennsylvania, before a crowd of 58,194. The victory marked the Nittany Lions’ fifth win of the season and kept them undefeated and untied. Penn State scored 26 points in the first quarter. Bob Nagle opened the scoring with a 10-yard touchdown run, followed by a 66-yard touchdown pass from Tom Shuman to Jimmy Scott. Fullback Tom Donchez added two rushing touchdowns later in the opening period, one set up by an interception and another following a long completion to Dan Natale.

Army managed its only points of the game in the second quarter on a 46-yard field goal by Jim Barclay. Penn State continued to score throughout the remainder of the contest, even after substituting reserves into the lineup. Nagle scored his second touchdown of the game, and Walt Addie added a 64-yard scoring run. Backup quarterback Dick Barvinchak later connected with Jim Eaise on a 35-yard touchdown pass, and John Huttenberger scored the final touchdown for Penn State.

Although John Cappelletti did not score, he led the offense with 151 rushing yards on 17 carries and set up several early touchdowns. Penn State amassed a season-high 607 yards of total offense, including 441 rushing yards. The Nittany Lion defense limited Army to 53 rushing yards and pressured quarterback King Fink throughout the game, recording multiple sacks.

== Roster ==
1973 Army Cadets football team roster
Players
Coaches
Offense

| Pos. | # | Name | Class |
|---|---|---|---|
| WR | | Barry Armstrong |
| OL | | Neil Begley |
| OL | | Bob Caslen |
| OL | | Ted Davis |
| QB | | Kinglsey Fink |
| RB | | Marcus Hardy |
| OL | | Ted Krawczyk |
| OL | | Pete Martin |
| TE | | Joe Miller |
| RB | | Dan Spangler |
| RB | | Willie Thigpen |
| TE | | Robbie Van Deusen |
| WR | | Jim Ward (C) |
| OL | | Bernie Wrezinski |

Defense

| Pos. | # | Name | Class |
|---|---|---|---|
| LB | | Chuck Baker |
| DL | | Ernie Cachere |
| LB | | Jim Cisek |
| DL | | Sal Colatarci |
| DL | | Rick Conniff |
| LB | | Dave Duncavage |
| LB | | Greg Dyson |
| DB | | Scott Gillogly |
| DL | | Bob Johnson |
| DB | | Gary May |
| LB | | Dave Molten |
| DL | | Kerry Parker |
| DB | | Robby Richards |
| DB | | Al Staerkel |
| LB | | Jim Waechter |
| LB | | Skip Whitman (C) |

Special teams

| Pos. | # | Name | Class |

Head coach

- Tom Cahill

Coordinators/assistant coaches

Legend

- (C) Team captain
- (S) Suspended
- (I) Ineligible
- Injured
- Redshirt
