= 1973 Boston College Eagles football team =

American college football season

1973 Boston College Eagles football
- Conference: Independent
- Record: 7–4
- Head coach: Joe Yukica (6th season)
- Captains: Jim Combs; Tom Condon; Gary Marangi
- Home stadium: Alumni Stadium

1973 NCAA Division I independents football records
	Conf.			Overall
Team	W	L	T	W		L		T
No. 1 Notre Dame		–		11	–	0	–	0
No. 5 Penn State		–		12	–	0	–	0
No. 9 Houston		–		11	–	1	–	0
Temple		–		9	–	1	–	0
No. 20 Tulane		–		9	–	3	–	0
Memphis State		–		8	–	3	–	0
Tampa		–		8	–	3	–	0
Boston College		–		7	–	4	–	0
South Carolina		–		7	–	4	–	0
Utah State		–		7	–	4	–	0
Air Force		–		6	–	4	–	0
Southern Miss		–		6	–	4	–	1
Northern Illinois		–		6	–	5	–	0
Rutgers		–		6	–	5	–	0
West Virginia		–		6	–	5	–	0
Pittsburgh		–		6	–	5	–	1
Colgate		–		5	–	5	–	0
Dayton		–		5	–	5	–	1
Xavier		–		5	–	5	–	1
Georgia Tech		–		5	–	6	–	0
Holy Cross		–		5	–	6	–	0
Miami (FL)		–		5	–	6	–	0
Cincinnati		–		4	–	7	–	0
Marshall		–		4	–	7	–	0
Navy		–		4	–	7	–	0
Southern Illinois		–		3	–	7	–	1
Villanova		–		3	–	8	–	0
Syracuse		–		2	–	9	–	0
Virginia Tech		–		2	–	9	–	0
Army		–		0	–	10	–	0
Florida State		–		0	–	11	–	0
Rankings from AP Poll

The 1973 Boston College Eagles football team represented Boston College as an independent during the 1973 NCAA Division I football season. Led by sxith-year head coach Joe Yukica, the Eagles compiled a record of 7–4. Boston College played home games at Alumni Stadium in Chestnut Hill, Massachusetts.

== Schedule ==
Date	Time	Opponent	Site	Result	Attendance	Source
September 15		Temple	Alumni Stadium; Chestnut Hill, MA	W 45–0	27,710	
September 22		at Tulane	Tulane Stadium; New Orleans, LA	L 16–21	33,880	
September 29		at Texas A&M	Kyle Field; College Station, TX	W 32–24	36,317	
October 6		Navy	Alumni Stadium; Chestnut Hill, MA	W 44–7	30,187	
October 12	8:03 p.m.	at No. 16 Miami (FL)	Miami Orange Bowl; Miami, FL	L 10–15	25,418	
October 20		Pittsburgh	Alumni Stadium; Chestnut Hill, MA	L 14–28	23,219	
October 27	1:30 p.m.	Villanova	Alumni Stadium; Chestnut Hill, MA	W 11–7	16,226	
November 10		at West Virginia	Mountaineer Field; Morgantown, WV	W 25–13	22,500	
November 17		at Syracuse	Archbold Stadium; Syracuse, NY	L 13–24	11,199	
November 24		UMass	Alumni Stadium; Chestnut Hill, MA (rivalry)	W 59–14	19,227	
December 1		at Holy Cross	Fitton Field; Worcester, MA (rivalry)	W 42–21	22,500	
Rankings from AP Poll released prior to the game; All times are in Eastern time

== Roster ==
1973 Boston College Eagles football team roster
Players
Coaches
Offense

Pos.	#	Name	Class
RB	27	Keith Barnette
RB	33	Phil Bennett
G	60	Greg Brand
OT	79	Gordon Browne	Sr
WR	22	Mel Briggs
WR	45	Tom Colclough
G	68	Tom Condon
QB	19	Jerry Concannon
C	52	Steve Corbett	Sr
G	65	Art Driscoll	Jr
RB	26	Mike Esposito
TE	86	Mike Jackson
OT	72	Al Krevis
QB	14	Mike Kruczek	So
TE	89	Chris Leber
G	62	Don Macek
QB	12	Gary Marangi	Sr
OT	77	Gary O'Hagen
C	59	Jerry Petercuskie
WR	28	Howie Richardson
WR	41	Dennis Rozum
TE	83	Bob Rush
G	64	Steve Schindler
RB	30	Frank Smith
RB	44	Earl Strong
G	67	Tom Vine
TE	80	Bob Watts
WR	21	Dave Zumbach

Defense

Pos.	#	Name	Class
DE	82	Rick Aloi
DE	84	Pat Bentzel
LB	31	Gene Brown
DT	76	Mark Burlingame
DT	57	Pete Cronan
LB	50	Brian Clemente
LB	54	Jim Combs
LB	51	Kevin Cunniff
DE	81	Art Daniels
LB	39	Gary Cottet	Jr
DE	85	Byron Hemingway
LB	32	Bob Howatt
DB	40	Ned Guillet
DB	15	Ken Ladd
DB	48	Chuck Lee
DE	88	Paul Martin
LB	37	Alex MacLellan
LB	66	Dennis McCleary
LB	34	John Petercuskie
S	23	John Peterson
LB	49	Don Peterson
LB	53	Rich Ramiraz
DB	25	Pat Scambati
DB	18	Steve Scialabba
LB	38	Bill Smith
DT	75	Joe Sullivan
DT	73	Steve Turner
DT	69	Jim Whidden

Special teams

Pos.	#	Name	Class
K	24	Fred Steinfort

Head coach

- Joe Yukica

Coordinators/assistant coaches

Legend

- (C) Team captain
- (S) Suspended
- (I) Ineligible
- Injured
- Redshirt
