= 1973 Air Force Falcons football team =

American college football season

1973 Air Force Falcons football
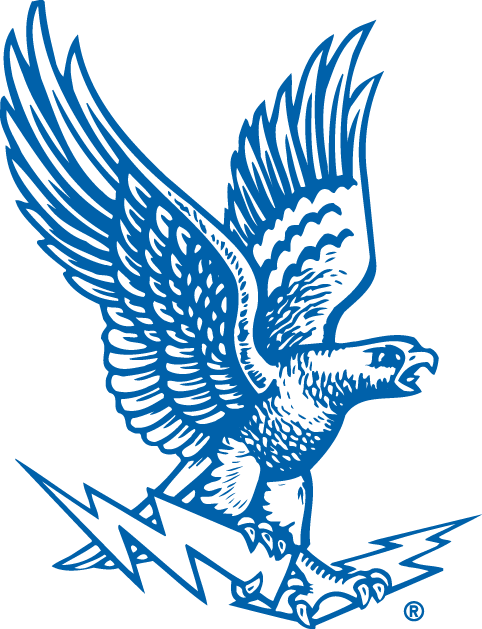
- Conference: Independent
- Record: 6–4
- Head coach: Ben Martin (16th season)
- Captains: Rich Haynie; Jim Morris
- Home stadium: Falcon Stadium

1973 NCAA Division I independents football records
| | Conf. | | | Overall |
| Team | W | L | T | W | | L | | T |
|---|---|---|---|---|---|---|---|---|
| No. 1 Notre Dame | | – | | 11 | – | 0 | – | 0 |
| No. 5 Penn State | | – | | 12 | – | 0 | – | 0 |
| No. 9 Houston | | – | | 11 | – | 1 | – | 0 |
| Temple | | – | | 9 | – | 1 | – | 0 |
| No. 20 Tulane | | – | | 9 | – | 3 | – | 0 |
| Memphis State | | – | | 8 | – | 3 | – | 0 |
| Tampa | | – | | 8 | – | 3 | – | 0 |
| Boston College | | – | | 7 | – | 4 | – | 0 |
| South Carolina | | – | | 7 | – | 4 | – | 0 |
| Utah State | | – | | 7 | – | 4 | – | 0 |
| Air Force | | – | | 6 | – | 4 | – | 0 |
| Southern Miss | | – | | 6 | – | 4 | – | 1 |
| Northern Illinois | | – | | 6 | – | 5 | – | 0 |
| Rutgers | | – | | 6 | – | 5 | – | 0 |
| West Virginia | | – | | 6 | – | 5 | – | 0 |
| Pittsburgh | | – | | 6 | – | 5 | – | 1 |
| Colgate | | – | | 5 | – | 5 | – | 0 |
| Dayton | | – | | 5 | – | 5 | – | 1 |
| Xavier | | – | | 5 | – | 5 | – | 1 |
| Georgia Tech | | – | | 5 | – | 6 | – | 0 |
| Holy Cross | | – | | 5 | – | 6 | – | 0 |
| Miami (FL) | | – | | 5 | – | 6 | – | 0 |
| Cincinnati | | – | | 4 | – | 7 | – | 0 |
| Marshall | | – | | 4 | – | 7 | – | 0 |
| Navy | | – | | 4 | – | 7 | – | 0 |
| Southern Illinois | | – | | 3 | – | 7 | – | 1 |
| Villanova | | – | | 3 | – | 8 | – | 0 |
| Syracuse | | – | | 2 | – | 9 | – | 0 |
| Virginia Tech | | – | | 2 | – | 9 | – | 0 |
| Army | | – | | 0 | – | 10 | – | 0 |
| Florida State | | – | | 0 | – | 11 | – | 0 |
Rankings from AP Poll

The 1973 Air Force Falcons football team represented the United States Air Force Academy as an independent during the 1973 NCAA Division I football season. Led by 16th-year head coach Ben Martin, the Falcons compiled a record of 6–4 for the third consecutive season and were outscored by their opponents 239–223. Air Force played their home games at Falcon Stadium in Colorado Springs, Colorado.

== Schedule ==
| Date | Time | Opponent | Site | TV | Result | Attendance | Source |
|---|---|---|---|---|---|---|---|
| September 22 | 2:57 p.m. | Oregon | Falcon Stadium; Colorado Springs, CO | ABC | W 24–17 | 34,541 | |
| September 29 | 1:30 p.m. | New Mexico | Falcon Stadium; Colorado Springs, CO | | W 10–6 | 33,390 | |
| October 6 | 1:57 p.m. | No. 7 Penn State | Falcon Stadium; Colorado Springs, CO | ABC | L 9–19 | 37,077 | |
| October 13 | | at No. 17 Colorado | Folsom Field; Boulder, CO | | L 17–38 | 50,115 | |
| October 20 | 12:02 p.m. | at Navy | Navy–Marine Corps Memorial Stadium; Annapolis, MD (Commander-in-Chief's Trophy) | | L 6–42 | 30,076 | |
| October 27 | 1:33 p.m. | Davidson | Falcon Stadium; Colorado Springs, CO | | W 41–19 | 34,682 | |
| November 3 | 1:01 p.m. | Army | Falcon Stadium; Colorado Springs, CO (Commander-in-Chief's Trophy) | | W 43–10 | 41,542 | |
| November 10 | 1:02 p.m. | Rutgers | Falcon Stadium; Colorado Springs, CO | | W 31–14 | 27,149 | |
| November 17 | 2:30 p.m. | at No. 19 Arizona | Arizona Stadium; Tucson, AZ | | W 27–26 | 39,733 | |
| November 22 | 11:30 a.m. | at No. 5 Notre Dame | Notre Dame Stadium; Notre Dame, IN (rivalry) | ABC | L 15–48 | 57,236 | |
Rankings from AP Poll released prior to the game; All times are in Mountain time

== Game summaries ==
=== Penn State ===
Penn State vs. Air Force

| Quarter | 1 | 2 | 3 | 4 | Total |
|---|---|---|---|---|---|
| Air Force | 3 | 0 | 0 | 6 | 9 |
| #7 Penn State | 0 | 13 | 6 | 0 | 19 |

at Falcon Stadium • Colorado Springs, CO

- Date: Saturday, October 6, 1973
- Game attendance: 37,077

Game information

First Quarter

- AFA — Gary Lawson 44-yard field goal

Second Quarter

- PSU — Gary Hayman 38-yard pass from Tom Shuman (Reihner kick)
- PSU — John Cappelletti 4-yard run (kick failed)

Third Quarter

- PSU — John Cappelletti 8-yard run (kick failed)

Fourth Quarter

- AFA — Billy Berry 45-yard pass from Rich Haynie (kick failed)

| Team | Category | Player | Statistics |
|---|---|---|---|
| AFA | Passing | Rich Haynie | TD pass |
| AFA | Rushing | | |
| AFA | Receiving | Billy Berry | 45-yard TD reception |
| PSU | Passing | Tom Shuman | TD pass to Gary Hayman |
| PSU | Rushing | John Cappelletti | 184 Rush Yds, 2 TD |
| PSU | Receiving | Gary Hayman | 38-yard TD reception |

Penn State defeated Air Force 19–9 on October 6, 1973, in a regionally televised game at Falcon Stadium in Colorado Springs. The Nittany Lions were held scoreless for more than a quarter by a quick and physical Air Force defense, which took an early 3–0 lead on Gary Lawson’s 44-yard field goal. Penn State broke through midway through the second quarter when quarterback Tom Shuman connected with Gary Hayman on a 38-yard touchdown pass.

Only 34 seconds later, following an Air Force fumble, John Cappelletti scored on a four-yard run to extend the lead. Cappelletti added his second touchdown early in the third quarter on an eight-yard run after Penn State marched 80 yards in seven plays following an end-zone interception by defensive back Jim Bradley. Air Force did not score again until the final period, when Rich Haynie threw a 45-yard touchdown pass to Billy Berry.

Cappelletti rushed for a then career-high 184 yards and two touchdowns, leading Penn State to its fourth straight victory and improving the Nittany Lions to 4–0 on the season.
