= 1973 Dayton Flyers football team =

American college football season

1973 Dayton Flyers football
- Conference: Independent
- Record: 5–5–1
- Head coach: Ron Marciniak (1st season)
- Home stadium: Baujan Field

1973 NCAA Division I independents football records
| | Conf. | | | Overall |
| Team | W | L | T | W | | L | | T |
|---|---|---|---|---|---|---|---|---|
| No. 1 Notre Dame | | – | | 11 | – | 0 | – | 0 |
| No. 5 Penn State | | – | | 12 | – | 0 | – | 0 |
| No. 9 Houston | | – | | 11 | – | 1 | – | 0 |
| Temple | | – | | 9 | – | 1 | – | 0 |
| No. 20 Tulane | | – | | 9 | – | 3 | – | 0 |
| Memphis State | | – | | 8 | – | 3 | – | 0 |
| Tampa | | – | | 8 | – | 3 | – | 0 |
| Boston College | | – | | 7 | – | 4 | – | 0 |
| South Carolina | | – | | 7 | – | 4 | – | 0 |
| Utah State | | – | | 7 | – | 4 | – | 0 |
| Air Force | | – | | 6 | – | 4 | – | 0 |
| Southern Miss | | – | | 6 | – | 4 | – | 1 |
| Northern Illinois | | – | | 6 | – | 5 | – | 0 |
| Rutgers | | – | | 6 | – | 5 | – | 0 |
| West Virginia | | – | | 6 | – | 5 | – | 0 |
| Pittsburgh | | – | | 6 | – | 5 | – | 1 |
| Colgate | | – | | 5 | – | 5 | – | 0 |
| Dayton | | – | | 5 | – | 5 | – | 1 |
| Xavier | | – | | 5 | – | 5 | – | 1 |
| Georgia Tech | | – | | 5 | – | 6 | – | 0 |
| Holy Cross | | – | | 5 | – | 6 | – | 0 |
| Miami (FL) | | – | | 5 | – | 6 | – | 0 |
| Cincinnati | | – | | 4 | – | 7 | – | 0 |
| Marshall | | – | | 4 | – | 7 | – | 0 |
| Navy | | – | | 4 | – | 7 | – | 0 |
| Southern Illinois | | – | | 3 | – | 7 | – | 1 |
| Villanova | | – | | 3 | – | 8 | – | 0 |
| Syracuse | | – | | 2 | – | 9 | – | 0 |
| Virginia Tech | | – | | 2 | – | 9 | – | 0 |
| Army | | – | | 0 | – | 10 | – | 0 |
| Florida State | | – | | 0 | – | 11 | – | 0 |
Rankings from AP Poll

The 1973 Dayton Flyers football team represented the University of Dayton as an independent during the 1973 NCAA Division I football season. In their first season under head coach Ron Marciniak, the Flyers compiled a 5–5–1 record.

== Schedule ==
| Date | Opponent | Site | Result | Attendance | Source |
|---|---|---|---|---|---|
| September 8 | at Youngstown State | Rayen Stadium; Youngstown, OH | W 22–0 | 10,279 | |
| September 15 | at Miami (OH) | Miami Field; Oxford, OH | L 0–32 | 7,200 | |
| September 22 | No. T–20 Bowling Green | Baujan Field; Dayton, OH | L 16–31 | 11,762 | |
| September 29 | Central Michigan | Baujan Field; Dayton, OH | L 6–15 | 8,237 | |
| October 6 | Southern Illinois | Baujan Field; Dayton, OH | W 23–19 | 7,881 | |
| October 13 | Ball State | Baujan Field; Dayton, OH | W 13–12 | 7,519 | |
| October 20 | at Toledo | Glass Bowl; Toledo, OH | L 10–14 | 12,286 | |
| October 27 | Drake | Baujan Field; Dayton, OH | W 16–9 | 7,683 | |
| November 3 | at Xavier | Xavier Stadium; Cincinnati, OH | T 28–28 | 6,741 | |
| November 10 | at Louisville | Fairgrounds Stadium; Louisville, KY | W 10–9 | 10,821 | |
| November 17 | at Marshall | Fairfield Stadium; Huntington, WV | L 14–37 | 9,630 | |
Rankings from AP Poll released prior to the game
