= 1973 Navy Midshipmen football team =

American college football season

1973 Navy Midshipmen football
- Conference: Independent
- Record: 4–7
- Head coach: George Welsh (1st season)
- Captain: Charlie Miletich
- Home stadium: Navy–Marine Corps Memorial Stadium

1973 NCAA Division I independents football records
	Conf.			Overall
Team	W	L	T	W		L		T
No. 1 Notre Dame		–		11	–	0	–	0
No. 5 Penn State		–		12	–	0	–	0
No. 9 Houston		–		11	–	1	–	0
Temple		–		9	–	1	–	0
No. 20 Tulane		–		9	–	3	–	0
Memphis State		–		8	–	3	–	0
Tampa		–		8	–	3	–	0
Boston College		–		7	–	4	–	0
South Carolina		–		7	–	4	–	0
Utah State		–		7	–	4	–	0
Air Force		–		6	–	4	–	0
Southern Miss		–		6	–	4	–	1
Northern Illinois		–		6	–	5	–	0
Rutgers		–		6	–	5	–	0
West Virginia		–		6	–	5	–	0
Pittsburgh		–		6	–	5	–	1
Colgate		–		5	–	5	–	0
Dayton		–		5	–	5	–	1
Xavier		–		5	–	5	–	1
Georgia Tech		–		5	–	6	–	0
Holy Cross		–		5	–	6	–	0
Miami (FL)		–		5	–	6	–	0
Cincinnati		–		4	–	7	–	0
Marshall		–		4	–	7	–	0
Navy		–		4	–	7	–	0
Southern Illinois		–		3	–	7	–	1
Villanova		–		3	–	8	–	0
Syracuse		–		2	–	9	–	0
Virginia Tech		–		2	–	9	–	0
Army		–		0	–	10	–	0
Florida State		–		0	–	11	–	0
Rankings from AP Poll

The 1973 Navy Midshipmen football team represented the United States Naval Academy (USNA) as an independent during the 1973 NCAA Division I football season. The team was led by first-year head coach George Welsh.

== Schedule ==
Date	Time	Opponent	Site	Result	Attendance	Source
September 15	1:30 p.m.	at VMI	Alumni Memorial Field; Lexington, VA	W 37–6	10,000	
September 22	2:00 p.m.	No. 7 Penn State	Navy–Marine Corps Memorial Stadium; Annapolis, MD	L 0–39	28,383	
September 29	1:30 p.m.	at Michigan	Michigan Stadium; Ann Arbor, MI	L 0–14	88,042	
October 6		at Boston College	Alumni Stadium; Chestnut Hill, MA	L 7–44	30,187	
October 13		Syracuse^{†}	Navy–Marine Corps Memorial Stadium; Annapolis, MD	W 23–14	20,591	
October 20	2:02 p.m.	Air Force	Navy–Marine Corps Memorial Stadium; Annapolis, MD (Commander-in-Chief's Trophy)	W 42–6	30,076	
October 27	1:33 p.m.	at Pittsburgh	Pitt Stadium; Pittsburgh, PA	L 17–22	33,136	
November 3	1:30 p.m.	at Notre Dame	Notre Dame Stadium; Notre Dame, IN (rivalry)	L 7–44	59,075	
November 10	8:35 p.m.	at Tulane	Tulane Stadium; New Orleans, LA	L 15–17	40,134–40,135	
November 17	8:00 p.m.	vs. Georgia Tech	Gator Bowl Stadium; Jacksonville, FL	L 22–26	26,235	
December 1	1:30 p.m.	vs. Army	John F. Kennedy Stadium; Philadelphia, PA (Army–Navy Game)	W 51–0	91,926	
^{†}Homecoming; Rankings from AP Poll released prior to the game; All times are in Eastern time

== Game summaries ==
=== Army ===
Army Cadets vs. Navy Midshipmen

Quarter	1	2	3	4	Total
Navy	6	31	14	0	51
Army	0	0	0	0	0

at JFK Stadium • Philadelphia, Pennsylvania

- Date: December 1

Game information

Navy

- Cleveland Cooper 102 Rush Yds

Army

== Roster ==
1973 Navy Midshipmen football team roster
Players
Coaches
Offense

Pos.	#	Name	Class
WR	80	Robin Ameen	So
WR	33	Bert Calland	Sr
G	66	Cliff Collier	Jr
RB	25	Cleveland Cooper	Jr
RB	22	Ed Gilmore	So
QB	14	Allen Glenny	Sr
WR	40	Tom Goodman	Sr
C	74	Carl Halbriener	Sr
RB	38	Bob Jackson	So
RB	24	Tim Jones	So
RB	30	Dan Lam	Jr
G	52	Max Legg	Sr
OT	71	Len May	Sr
RB	31	Tom McIlravy	So
RB	20	Will Merrell	Jr
G	61	Randy Mikal	Sr
OT	70	Don Montgomery	Sr
QB	16	Phil Poirier	So
TE	81	Bill Smyth	Sr
RB	35	Junior Tupuola	So
WR	11	Larry Van Loan	Sr
QB	10	Mike Yeager	So

Defense

Pos.	#	Name	Class
LB	50	Andy Bushak	So
DB	28	Ken Dunn	Sr
LB	58	Dan Drsicoll	Sr
DT	63	Rod Garfield	Sr
DL	84	Tim Harden	Jr
DL	54	George Markulis	Jr
DL	83	Al Mayfield	Sr
LB	82	Charlie Miletich	Sr
DB	48	Chet Moeller	So
DB	26	Len Mokan	So
DL	69	Gary McConnell	So
DB	34	Ike Owens	So
DL	77	Dave Papak	So
DB	36	Mike Phillips	Sr
DB	17	Jack Reader
DB	47	Charlie Robinson	Sr
LB	65	Jeff Scott
DL	79	James Wooley	Jr

Special teams

Pos.	#	Name	Class
K	91	Steve Dykes	Fr

Head coach

- George Welsh

Coordinators/assistant coaches

- Len Fontes – Defensive backs

Legend

- (C) Team captain
- (S) Suspended
- (I) Ineligible
- Injured
- Redshirt
