= 1973 Memphis State Tigers football team =

American college football season

1973 Memphis State Tigers football
- Conference: Independent
- Record: 8–3
- Head coach: Fred Pancoast (2nd season)
- Home stadium: Memphis Memorial Stadium

1973 NCAA Division I independents football records
	Conf.			Overall
Team	W	L	T	W		L		T
No. 1 Notre Dame		–		11	–	0	–	0
No. 5 Penn State		–		12	–	0	–	0
No. 9 Houston		–		11	–	1	–	0
Temple		–		9	–	1	–	0
No. 20 Tulane		–		9	–	3	–	0
Memphis State		–		8	–	3	–	0
Tampa		–		8	–	3	–	0
Boston College		–		7	–	4	–	0
South Carolina		–		7	–	4	–	0
Utah State		–		7	–	4	–	0
Air Force		–		6	–	4	–	0
Southern Miss		–		6	–	4	–	1
Northern Illinois		–		6	–	5	–	0
Rutgers		–		6	–	5	–	0
West Virginia		–		6	–	5	–	0
Pittsburgh		–		6	–	5	–	1
Colgate		–		5	–	5	–	0
Dayton		–		5	–	5	–	1
Xavier		–		5	–	5	–	1
Georgia Tech		–		5	–	6	–	0
Holy Cross		–		5	–	6	–	0
Miami (FL)		–		5	–	6	–	0
Cincinnati		–		4	–	7	–	0
Marshall		–		4	–	7	–	0
Navy		–		4	–	7	–	0
Southern Illinois		–		3	–	7	–	1
Villanova		–		3	–	8	–	0
Syracuse		–		2	–	9	–	0
Virginia Tech		–		2	–	9	–	0
Army		–		0	–	10	–	0
Florida State		–		0	–	11	–	0
Rankings from AP Poll

The 1973 Memphis State Tigers football team represented Memphis State University (now known as the University of Memphis) as an independent during the 1973 NCAA Division I football season. In its second season under head coach Fred Pancoast, the team compiled an 8–3 record and outscored opponents by a total of 264 to 167. The team played its home games at Memphis Memorial Stadium in Memphis, Tennessee.

The team's statistical leaders included David Fowler with 759 passing yards, Dornell Harris with 564 rushing yards, Bobby Ward with 744 receiving yards, and Bobby Ward and Cliff Taylor with 42 points scored each.

== Schedule ==
Date	Time	Opponent	Site	Result	Attendance	Source
September 8		Louisville	Memphis Memorial Stadium; Memphis, TN (rivalry)	W 28–21	33,164	
September 15		North Texas State	Memphis Memorial Stadium; Memphis, TN	W 24–3	25,518	
September 22		at Ole Miss	Mississippi Veterans Memorial Stadium; Jackson, MS (rivalry)	W 17–13	45,620	
September 29		No. 15 Houston	Memphis Memorial Stadium; Memphis, TN	L 21–35	40,126	
October 6	1:30 p.m.	at Kansas State	KSU Stadium; Manhattan, KS	L 16–21	34,970	
October 13		Tulsa	Memphis Memorial Stadium; Memphis, TN	W 28–16	10,420	
October 20	1:00 p.m.	at Florida State	Doak Campbell Stadium; Tallahassee, FL	W 13–10	28,883	
November 3	7:30 p.m.	Virginia Tech	Memphis Memorial Stadium; Memphis, TN	W 49–16	27,454	
November 10		Southern Miss^{†}	Memphis Memorial Stadium; Memphis, TN (Black and Blue Bowl)	L 10–13	23,399	
November 17		at Southwestern Louisiana	Cajun Field; Lafayette, LA	W 41–6	6,600	
November 24	12:30 p.m.	at Cincinnati	Nippert Stadium; Cincinnati, OH (rivalry)	W 17–13	3,215	
^{†}Homecoming; Rankings from AP Poll released prior to the game; All times are in Central time
