= 1973 Southern Miss Golden Eagles football team =

American college football season

1973 Southern Miss Golden Eagles football
- Conference: Independent
- Record: 6–4–1
- Head coach: P. W. Underwood (5th season)
- Home stadium: Faulkner Field

1973 NCAA Division I independents football records
	Conf.			Overall
Team	W	L	T	W		L		T
No. 1 Notre Dame		–		11	–	0	–	0
No. 5 Penn State		–		12	–	0	–	0
No. 9 Houston		–		11	–	1	–	0
Temple		–		9	–	1	–	0
No. 20 Tulane		–		9	–	3	–	0
Memphis State		–		8	–	3	–	0
Tampa		–		8	–	3	–	0
Boston College		–		7	–	4	–	0
South Carolina		–		7	–	4	–	0
Utah State		–		7	–	4	–	0
Air Force		–		6	–	4	–	0
Southern Miss		–		6	–	4	–	1
Northern Illinois		–		6	–	5	–	0
Rutgers		–		6	–	5	–	0
West Virginia		–		6	–	5	–	0
Pittsburgh		–		6	–	5	–	1
Colgate		–		5	–	5	–	0
Dayton		–		5	–	5	–	1
Xavier		–		5	–	5	–	1
Georgia Tech		–		5	–	6	–	0
Holy Cross		–		5	–	6	–	0
Miami (FL)		–		5	–	6	–	0
Cincinnati		–		4	–	7	–	0
Marshall		–		4	–	7	–	0
Navy		–		4	–	7	–	0
Southern Illinois		–		3	–	7	–	1
Villanova		–		3	–	8	–	0
Syracuse		–		2	–	9	–	0
Virginia Tech		–		2	–	9	–	0
Army		–		0	–	10	–	0
Florida State		–		0	–	11	–	0
Rankings from AP Poll

The 1973 Southern Miss Golden Eagles football team was an American football team that represented the University of Southern Mississippi as an independent during the 1973 NCAA Division I football season. In their fifth year under head coach P. W. Underwood, the team compiled a 6–4–1 record.

== Schedule ==
Date	Time	Opponent	Site	Result	Attendance	Source
September 15		East Carolina	Faulkner Field; Hattiesburg, MS	L 0–13	10,800	
September 22		at No. 15 Florida	Tampa Stadium; Tampa, FL	L 13–14	38,377	
September 29		at Ole Miss	Hemingway Stadium; Oxford, MS	L 0–41	31,500	
October 6		at Chattanooga	Chamberlain Field; Chattanooga, TN	W 42–7	10,000	
October 13		at Richmond	City Stadium; Richmond, VA (Tobacco Bowl)	L 20–42	20,000	
October 20	7:30 p.m.	at UT Arlington	Arlington Stadium; Arlington, TX	W 41–14	4,000	
October 27		at Mississippi State	Scott Field; Starkville, MS	T 10–10	33,500	
November 3		Weber State^{†}	Faulkner Field; Hattiesburg, MS	W 28–7	10,100	
November 10		at Memphis State	Memphis Memorial Stadium; Memphis, TN (rivalry)	W 13–10	23,399	
November 17	7:32 p.m.	at West Texas State	Kimbrough Memorial Stadium; Canyon, TX	W 28–0	5,800	
November 22		Utah State	Faulkner Field; Hattiesburg, MS	W 32–8	6,000	
^{†}Homecoming; Rankings from AP Poll released prior to the game; All times are in Central time
