= 1973 Virginia Tech Gobblers football team =

American college football season

1973 Virginia Tech Gobblers football
- Conference: Independent
- Record: 2–9
- Head coach: Charlie Coffey (3rd season)
- Offensive coordinator: Dan Henning (2nd season)
- Home stadium: Lane Stadium

1973 NCAA Division I independents football records
	Conf.			Overall
Team	W	L	T	W		L		T
No. 1 Notre Dame		–		11	–	0	–	0
No. 5 Penn State		–		12	–	0	–	0
No. 9 Houston		–		11	–	1	–	0
Temple		–		9	–	1	–	0
No. 20 Tulane		–		9	–	3	–	0
Memphis State		–		8	–	3	–	0
Tampa		–		8	–	3	–	0
Boston College		–		7	–	4	–	0
South Carolina		–		7	–	4	–	0
Utah State		–		7	–	4	–	0
Air Force		–		6	–	4	–	0
Southern Miss		–		6	–	4	–	1
Northern Illinois		–		6	–	5	–	0
Rutgers		–		6	–	5	–	0
West Virginia		–		6	–	5	–	0
Pittsburgh		–		6	–	5	–	1
Colgate		–		5	–	5	–	0
Dayton		–		5	–	5	–	1
Xavier		–		5	–	5	–	1
Georgia Tech		–		5	–	6	–	0
Holy Cross		–		5	–	6	–	0
Miami (FL)		–		5	–	6	–	0
Cincinnati		–		4	–	7	–	0
Marshall		–		4	–	7	–	0
Navy		–		4	–	7	–	0
Southern Illinois		–		3	–	7	–	1
Villanova		–		3	–	8	–	0
Syracuse		–		2	–	9	–	0
Virginia Tech		–		2	–	9	–	0
Army		–		0	–	10	–	0
Florida State		–		0	–	11	–	0
Rankings from AP Poll

The 1973 Virginia Tech Gobblers football team was an American football team that represented Virginia Tech as an independent during the 1973 NCAA Division I football season. In their third year under head coach Charlie Coffey, the Gobblers compiled an overall record of 2–9.

== Schedule ==
Date	Time	Opponent	Site	Result	Attendance	Source
September 8		William & Mary	Lane Stadium; Blacksburg, VA	L 24–31	18,500	
September 15		at Kentucky	Commonwealth Stadium; Lexington, KY	L 26–31	> 48,000	
September 22		at West Virginia	Mountaineer Field; Morgantown, WV (rivalry)	L 10–24	33,000	
September 29		at SMU	Texas Stadium; Irving, TX	L 6–37	13,683	
October 6		South Carolina^{†}	Lane Stadium; Blacksburg, VA	L 24–27	38,000	
October 12		at No. 14 Houston	Houston Astrodome; Houston, TX	L 27–54	27,103	
October 20		Virginia	Lane Stadium; Blacksburg, VA (rivalry)	W 27–15	38,000	
October 27		at No. 2 Alabama	Denny Stadium; Tuscaloosa, AL	L 6–77	57,009	
November 3	8:30 p.m.	at Memphis State	Memphis Memorial Stadium; Memphis, TN	L 16–49	27,454	
November 10		Florida State	Lane Stadium; Blacksburg, VA	W 36–13	25,000	
November 17		VMI	Lane Stadium; Blacksburg, VA (rivalry)	L 21–22	23,000	
^{†}Homecoming; Rankings from AP Poll released prior to the game; All times are in Eastern time

== Roster ==
The following players were members of the 1973 football team according to the roster published in the 1974 edition of The Bugle, the Virginia Tech yearbook.

1973 Virginia Tech roster
Paul Adams; Mike Arbaugh; Bruce Arians; Richard Arthur; James William "J.B." Barber, Jr.; Malcolm Barrick; Jack Baumgardner; Larry Bearekman; Tom Beasley; John Bell; Brent Bledsoe; Morris Blueford; Larry Blunt; Richard Bond; Jack Booth; Mike Callison; Doug Carneal; Carlos Castilla; Chris Courtney; Skip Creasey; Jack Crews; Allen Cure; John Dasovich; Ron "Flash" Davis; Kevin Dick; Dennis Dodson; George Dodson; Mike Enzlow; Bill Filtz; Steve Fisher; Stephen C. Galloway; Barry Garber; Ted Gardner; Keith Gibson	David Halstead; Billy Hardee; Orin Harvey; Mike Hearring; George Heath; Jim Heizer; Kent Henry; Larry Herndon; Alex Hill; Peter Michael Horoszko; Bill Houseright; Jerry Inge; Eddie Joyce; Lester Karlin; Howard Keyes; Wayne Latimer; Ricky Law; Paul Lawrence; Chip Lawson; Bruce Arthur Lemmert; Billy Linson; Marty Little; Curt Lowery; Danny Ludd; Luke Marsengill; Charley Martin; Steve Mathieson; Randy McCann; Keith McCarter; Lynn McCoy; Bruce McDaniel; Ray McGinley; Tom Mikus	David Miller; Greg Mullinax; Jay Neal; Steve Pasi; Danny Patterson; Chuck Perdue; Steve Philbrick; Rick Popp; Tom Reynolds; William George Ritchie, Jr.; Bryant Robinson; Reginald Robinson; Phil Rogers; Ricky Scales; Jerry Scharnus; Rodney Schnurr; Rod M. Sedwick; Tom Shirley; Lou Smith; John Smithman; Bruce Hayford Striffler; Peter Christian Striffler; Andre Tennessee; Doug Thacker; Mike Thomas; Mitchell Thomas; Greg Toal; Tom Turner; Randy Vey; Bill Wallace; Lynn Weaver; David Wood; Joe Winfree
