= 1973 Miami Hurricanes football team =

American college football season

1973 Miami Hurricanes football
- Conference: Independent
- Record: 5–6
- Head coach: Pete Elliott (1st season)
- Offensive coordinator: Carl Selmer (2nd season)
- MVP: Tony Cristiani
- Home stadium: Miami Orange Bowl

1973 NCAA Division I independents football records
	Conf.			Overall
Team	W	L	T	W		L		T
No. 1 Notre Dame		–		11	–	0	–	0
No. 5 Penn State		–		12	–	0	–	0
No. 9 Houston		–		11	–	1	–	0
Temple		–		9	–	1	–	0
No. 20 Tulane		–		9	–	3	–	0
Memphis State		–		8	–	3	–	0
Tampa		–		8	–	3	–	0
Boston College		–		7	–	4	–	0
South Carolina		–		7	–	4	–	0
Utah State		–		7	–	4	–	0
Air Force		–		6	–	4	–	0
Southern Miss		–		6	–	4	–	1
Northern Illinois		–		6	–	5	–	0
Rutgers		–		6	–	5	–	0
West Virginia		–		6	–	5	–	0
Pittsburgh		–		6	–	5	–	1
Colgate		–		5	–	5	–	0
Dayton		–		5	–	5	–	1
Xavier		–		5	–	5	–	1
Georgia Tech		–		5	–	6	–	0
Holy Cross		–		5	–	6	–	0
Miami (FL)		–		5	–	6	–	0
Cincinnati		–		4	–	7	–	0
Marshall		–		4	–	7	–	0
Navy		–		4	–	7	–	0
Southern Illinois		–		3	–	7	–	1
Villanova		–		3	–	8	–	0
Syracuse		–		2	–	9	–	0
Virginia Tech		–		2	–	9	–	0
Army		–		0	–	10	–	0
Florida State		–		0	–	11	–	0
Rankings from AP Poll

The 1973 Miami Hurricanes football team represented the University of Miami as an independent during the 1973 NCAA Division I football season. Led by first-year head coach Pete Elliott, the Hurricanes played their home games at the Miami Orange Bowl in Miami, Florida. Miami finished the season with a record of 5–6.

== Schedule ==
Date	Time	Opponent	Rank	Site	Result	Attendance	Source
September 21	8:00 p.m.	No. 6 Texas		Miami Orange Bowl; Miami, FL	W 20–15	30,080	
September 29	4:00 p.m.	at Florida State	No. 18	Doak Campbell Stadium; Tallahassee, FL (rivalry)	W 14–10	22,278	
October 6	2:30 p.m.	at No. 6 Oklahoma	No. 17	Oklahoma Memorial Stadium; Norman, OK	L 20–24	61,826	
October 12	8:03 p.m.	Boston College	No. 16	Miami Orange Bowl; Miami, FL	W 15–10	25,418	
October 19	8:02 p.m.	No. 14 Houston	No. 15	Miami Orange Bowl; Miami, FL	L 7–30	29,340	
October 27	1:35 p.m.	at Syracuse		Archbold Stadium; Syracuse, NY	W 34–23	19,369	
November 2	8:03 p.m.	West Virginia		Miami Orange Bowl; Miami, FL	L 14–20	24,890	
November 10	1:30 p.m.	at Army		Michie Stadium; West Point, NY	W 19–7	41,047	
November 17		at No. 2 Alabama		Denny Stadium; Tuscaloosa, AL	L 13–43	58,404	
November 24	7:30 p.m.	Florida		Miami Orange Bowl; Miami, FL (rivalry)	L 7–14	39,071	
December 1	7:33 p.m.	No. 5 Notre Dame		Miami Orange Bowl; Miami, FL (rivalry)	L 0–44	42,968	
Rankings from AP Poll released prior to the game; All times are in Eastern time

== Game summaries ==
=== Texas ===
#6 Texas Longhorns (0–0) at Miami (FL) Hurricanes (0–0)

Quarter	1	2	3	4	Total
Texas	6	0	6	3	15
Miami (FL)	0	13	7	0	20

at Orange Bowl, Miami, Florida

- Date: September 21, 1973
- Game weather: 84 °F (29 °C)
- Game attendance: 30,080
- Box Score

Team	Category	Player	Statistics
Texas	Passing	Marty Akins	3/3, 42 yards
Texas	Rushing	Roosevelt Leaks	30 rushes, 153 yards, 2 TD
Texas	Receiving	Jim Moore	1 reception, 16 yards
Miami (FL)	Passing		
Miami (FL)	Rushing		
Miami (FL)	Receiving		

Scoring summary

Quarter	Time	Drive			Team	Scoring information	Score	
Quarter	Time	Plays	Yards	TOP	Team	Scoring information	UT	MIA
1	8:01	14	86	6:59	Texas	Roosevelt Leaks 5-yard touchdown run, Billy Schott kick no good	6	0
2	13:25	9	69	3:52	Miami (FL)	Woody Thompson 1-yard touchdown run, kick no good	6	6
2	3:42	16	70	8:57	Miami (FL)	Woody Thompson 1-yard touchdown run, Rod Huffman kick good	6	13
3	8:12	3	14	1:13	Miami (FL)	Woody Thompson 1-yard touchdown run, Rod Huffman kick good	6	20
3	4:50	8	54	3:14	Texas	Roosevelt Leaks 2-yard touchdown run, 2-point pass failed	12	20
4	12:44	10	55	4:09	Texas	34-yard field goal by Billy Schott	15	20
"TOP" = time of possession. For other American football terms, see Glossary of American football.							15	20

== Roster ==
1973 Miami Hurricanes football team roster
Players
Coaches
Offense

Pos.	#	Name	Class
TE		Phil August	Fr
QB		Kary Baker
RB		Jack Brasington
RB		Dennis Breckner
OL		Bill Capraun
RB		Silvio Cardoso
QB		Ed Carney
TE		Phil Corrigan
OL		Jim Dittmar
QB		Coy Hall
OL		Dennis Hannah
WR		Steve Marcantonio
RB		Alan Reynaud
OL		Wilmore Ritchie
OL		Fred Ross
WR		Walt Sweeting
RB		Woody Thompson
RB		Johnny Williams

Defense

Pos.	#	Name	Class
DL		Gary Altheide
DB		Mike Archer
DL		Rubin Carter
DB		Booker Cope
LB		Clarence Corker
DL		Tony Cristiani
DL		Mike Daly
DL		Gary Dunn
DB		Bill Frohbose
DL		Jose Gonzalez
LB		Rich Griffiths
DB		Paul Horschel
DB		Greg Ingram
LB		Rick Liddell
DB		Eldridge Mitchell
LB		Dominic Pisani
DB		Gary Streicher

Special teams

Pos.	#	Name	Class
K		Rod Huffman
K		Brian Selmer	Fr

Head coach

- Pete Elliott

Coordinators/assistant coaches

- Carl Selmer

Legend

- (C) Team captain
- (S) Suspended
- (I) Ineligible
- Injured
- Redshirt
