= 1973 Xavier Musketeers football team =

American college football season

1973 Xavier Musketeers football
- Conference: Independent
- Record: 5–5–1
- Head coach: Tom Cecchini (2nd season)
- Home stadium: Xavier Stadium

1973 NCAA Division I independents football records
	Conf.			Overall
Team	W	L	T	W		L		T
No. 1 Notre Dame		–		11	–	0	–	0
No. 5 Penn State		–		12	–	0	–	0
No. 9 Houston		–		11	–	1	–	0
Temple		–		9	–	1	–	0
No. 20 Tulane		–		9	–	3	–	0
Memphis State		–		8	–	3	–	0
Tampa		–		8	–	3	–	0
Boston College		–		7	–	4	–	0
South Carolina		–		7	–	4	–	0
Utah State		–		7	–	4	–	0
Air Force		–		6	–	4	–	0
Southern Miss		–		6	–	4	–	1
Northern Illinois		–		6	–	5	–	0
Rutgers		–		6	–	5	–	0
West Virginia		–		6	–	5	–	0
Pittsburgh		–		6	–	5	–	1
Colgate		–		5	–	5	–	0
Dayton		–		5	–	5	–	1
Xavier		–		5	–	5	–	1
Georgia Tech		–		5	–	6	–	0
Holy Cross		–		5	–	6	–	0
Miami (FL)		–		5	–	6	–	0
Cincinnati		–		4	–	7	–	0
Marshall		–		4	–	7	–	0
Navy		–		4	–	7	–	0
Southern Illinois		–		3	–	7	–	1
Villanova		–		3	–	8	–	0
Syracuse		–		2	–	9	–	0
Virginia Tech		–		2	–	9	–	0
Army		–		0	–	10	–	0
Florida State		–		0	–	11	–	0
Rankings from AP Poll

The 1973 Xavier Musketeers football team was an American football team that represented Xavier University as an independent during the 1973 NCAA Division I football season. In its second season under head coach Tom Cecchini, the team compiled a 5–5–1 record and was outscored by a total of 376 to 191.

On December 19, 1973, the Xavier University board of trustees voted 15 to 3 to discontinue the school's intercollegiate football program, effective immediately. The university's president, Rev. Robert W. Mulligan, attributed the decision to the "spiraling costs of intercollegiate football" which had led to a $200,000 deficit in 1973 despite the team having its most successful season in five years.

== Schedule ==
Date	Time	Opponent	Site	Result	Attendance	Source
September 8	7:30 p.m.	at Temple	Temple Stadium; Philadelphia, PA	L 7–49	10,753	
September 15	1:31 p.m.	at Cincinnati	Nippert Stadium; Cincinnati, OH (rivalry)	L 7–40	10,153	
September 21	7:30 p.m.	at Tampa	Tampa Stadium; Tampa, FL	L 7–34	11,362	
September 29	7:30 p.m.	at Marshall	Fairfield Stadium; Huntington, WV	W 30–28	13,500	
October 6	8:30 p.m.	at Southwestern Louisiana	Cajun Field; Lafayette, LA	W 17–14	8,000	
October 13		at Southern Illinois	McAndrew Stadium; Carbondale, IL	L 7–73	8,500	
October 20	8:30 p.m.	at Arkansas State	War Memorial Stadium; Little Rock, AR	L 0–37	12,000	
November 3	2:00 p.m.	Dayton	Xavier Stadium; Cincinnati, OH	T 28–28	6,741	
November 10	2:00 p.m.	Northern Illinois	Xavier Stadium; Cincinnati, OH	W 40–36	4,831	
November 17	2:00 p.m.	Villanova	Xavier Stadium; Cincinnati, OH	W 13–6	6,564	
November 23	2:00 p.m.	Toledo	Xavier Stadium; Cincinnati, OH	W 35–31	6,307	
All times are in Eastern time
