= 1973 Syracuse Orangemen football team =

American college football season

1973 Syracuse Orangemen football
- Conference: Independent
- Record: 2–9
- Head coach: Ben Schwartzwalder (25th season)
- Captain: Game captains
- Home stadium: Archbold Stadium

1973 NCAA Division I independents football records
| | Conf. | | | Overall |
| Team | W | L | T | W | | L | | T |
|---|---|---|---|---|---|---|---|---|
| No. 1 Notre Dame | | – | | 11 | – | 0 | – | 0 |
| No. 5 Penn State | | – | | 12 | – | 0 | – | 0 |
| No. 9 Houston | | – | | 11 | – | 1 | – | 0 |
| Temple | | – | | 9 | – | 1 | – | 0 |
| No. 20 Tulane | | – | | 9 | – | 3 | – | 0 |
| Memphis State | | – | | 8 | – | 3 | – | 0 |
| Tampa | | – | | 8 | – | 3 | – | 0 |
| Boston College | | – | | 7 | – | 4 | – | 0 |
| South Carolina | | – | | 7 | – | 4 | – | 0 |
| Utah State | | – | | 7 | – | 4 | – | 0 |
| Air Force | | – | | 6 | – | 4 | – | 0 |
| Southern Miss | | – | | 6 | – | 4 | – | 1 |
| Northern Illinois | | – | | 6 | – | 5 | – | 0 |
| Rutgers | | – | | 6 | – | 5 | – | 0 |
| West Virginia | | – | | 6 | – | 5 | – | 0 |
| Pittsburgh | | – | | 6 | – | 5 | – | 1 |
| Colgate | | – | | 5 | – | 5 | – | 0 |
| Dayton | | – | | 5 | – | 5 | – | 1 |
| Xavier | | – | | 5 | – | 5 | – | 1 |
| Georgia Tech | | – | | 5 | – | 6 | – | 0 |
| Holy Cross | | – | | 5 | – | 6 | – | 0 |
| Miami (FL) | | – | | 5 | – | 6 | – | 0 |
| Cincinnati | | – | | 4 | – | 7 | – | 0 |
| Marshall | | – | | 4 | – | 7 | – | 0 |
| Navy | | – | | 4 | – | 7 | – | 0 |
| Southern Illinois | | – | | 3 | – | 7 | – | 1 |
| Villanova | | – | | 3 | – | 8 | – | 0 |
| Syracuse | | – | | 2 | – | 9 | – | 0 |
| Virginia Tech | | – | | 2 | – | 9 | – | 0 |
| Army | | – | | 0 | – | 10 | – | 0 |
| Florida State | | – | | 0 | – | 11 | – | 0 |
Rankings from AP Poll

The 1973 Syracuse Orangemen football team represented Syracuse University as an independent during the 1973 NCAA Division I football season. The team was led by head coach Ben Schwartzwalder, in his 25th and final year with the team, and played their home games at Archbold Stadium in Syracuse, New York. The team finished with a record of 2–9. At the conclusion of the season, Ben Schwartzwalder retired as Syracuse's all-time winningest coach with an overall record of 153–91–3.

== Schedule ==
| Date | Time | Opponent | Site | Result | Attendance | Source |
|---|---|---|---|---|---|---|
| September 15 | 1:30 p.m. | Bowling Green | Archbold Stadium; Syracuse, NY | L 14–41 | 18,254 | |
| September 22 | | Michigan State | Archbold Stadium; Syracuse, NY | L 8–14 | 21,821 | |
| September 29 | | at Washington | Husky Stadium; Seattle, WA | L 7–21 | 54,800 | |
| October 6 | | at Maryland | Byrd Stadium; College Park, MD | L 0–38 | 32,800 | |
| October 13 | | at Navy | Navy–Marine Corps Memorial Stadium; Annapolis, MD | L 14–23 | 20,591 | |
| October 20 | | No. 5 Penn State | Archbold Stadium; Syracuse, NY (rivalry) | L 6–49 | 27,595 | |
| October 27 | 1:35 p.m. | Miami (FL) | Archbold Stadium; Syracuse, NY | L 23–34 | 19,369 | |
| November 3 | | at Pittsburgh | Pitt Stadium; Pittsburgh, PA (rivalry) | L 14–28 | 24,932 | |
| November 10 | | at Holy Cross | Fitton Field; Worcester, MA | W 5–3 | 16,404 | |
| November 17 | | Boston College | Archbold Stadium; Syracuse, NY | W 24–13 | 11,199 | |
| November 24 | | West Virginia | Archbold Stadium; Syracuse, NY (rivalry) | L 14–24 | 12,917 | |
Rankings from AP Poll released prior to the game
