= 1973 Utah State Aggies football team =

American college football season

1973 Utah State Aggies football
- Conference: Independent
- Record: 7–4
- Head coach: Phil Krueger (1st season)
- Home stadium: Romney Stadium

1973 NCAA Division I independents football records
	Conf.			Overall
Team	W	L	T	W		L		T
No. 1 Notre Dame		–		11	–	0	–	0
No. 5 Penn State		–		12	–	0	–	0
No. 9 Houston		–		11	–	1	–	0
Temple		–		9	–	1	–	0
No. 20 Tulane		–		9	–	3	–	0
Memphis State		–		8	–	3	–	0
Tampa		–		8	–	3	–	0
Boston College		–		7	–	4	–	0
South Carolina		–		7	–	4	–	0
Utah State		–		7	–	4	–	0
Air Force		–		6	–	4	–	0
Southern Miss		–		6	–	4	–	1
Northern Illinois		–		6	–	5	–	0
Rutgers		–		6	–	5	–	0
West Virginia		–		6	–	5	–	0
Pittsburgh		–		6	–	5	–	1
Colgate		–		5	–	5	–	0
Dayton		–		5	–	5	–	1
Xavier		–		5	–	5	–	1
Georgia Tech		–		5	–	6	–	0
Holy Cross		–		5	–	6	–	0
Miami (FL)		–		5	–	6	–	0
Cincinnati		–		4	–	7	–	0
Marshall		–		4	–	7	–	0
Navy		–		4	–	7	–	0
Southern Illinois		–		3	–	7	–	1
Villanova		–		3	–	8	–	0
Syracuse		–		2	–	9	–	0
Virginia Tech		–		2	–	9	–	0
Army		–		0	–	10	–	0
Florida State		–		0	–	11	–	0
Rankings from AP Poll

The 1973 Utah State Aggies football team was an American football team that represented Utah State University as an independent during the 1973 NCAA Division I football season. In their first season under head coach Phil Krueger, the Aggies compiled a 7–4 record and were outscored by opponents by a total of 230 to 202.

The team's statistical leaders included Tom Wilson with 1,177 passing yards, Archie Gibson with 1,150 rushing yards, Craig Clark with 495 receiving yards, Jerry Cox with 60 points scored, and Brian Longuevan with 80 total tackles.

== Schedule ==
Date	Time	Opponent	Site	Result	Attendance	Source
September 15		at Weber State	Wildcat Stadium; Ogden, UT	W 10–3	17,312	
September 22		San Diego State	Romney Stadium; Logan, UT	L 7–35	10,225	
September 29		at UNLV	Las Vegas Stadium; Whitney, NV	W 7–3	12,486	
October 6		BYU	Romney Stadium; Logan, UT (rivalry)	W 13–7	15,046	
October 13		at Colorado State	Hughes Stadium; Fort Collins, CO	W 34–18	27,103	
October 20	6:30 p.m.	at West Texas State	Kimbrough Memorial Stadium; Canyon, TX	W 36–14	13,800	
October 27	1:30 p.m.	Kent State	Romney Stadium; Logan, UT	L 16–27	8,703	
November 3		Wyoming	Romney Stadium; Logan, UT (rivalry)	W 31–20	11,792	
November 10		at New Mexico State	Memorial Stadium; Las Cruces, NM	W 30–12	8,433	
November 17		at Utah	Robert Rice Stadium; Salt Lake City, UT (Battle of the Brothers)	L 28–31	27,842	
November 22		at Southern Miss	Faulkner Field; Hattiesburg, MS	L 8–32	6,000	
All times are in Mountain time
