= 1973 Tampa Spartans football team =

American college football season

1973 Tampa Spartans football
- Conference: Independent
- Record: 8–3
- Head coach: Dennis Fryzel (1st season)
- Offensive coordinator: Jim Ragland (1st season)
- Defensive coordinator: Wayne Chapman (1st season)
- Home stadium: Tampa Stadium

1973 NCAA Division I independents football records
	Conf.			Overall
Team	W	L	T	W		L		T
No. 1 Notre Dame		–		11	–	0	–	0
No. 5 Penn State		–		12	–	0	–	0
No. 9 Houston		–		11	–	1	–	0
Temple		–		9	–	1	–	0
No. 20 Tulane		–		9	–	3	–	0
Memphis State		–		8	–	3	–	0
Tampa		–		8	–	3	–	0
Boston College		–		7	–	4	–	0
South Carolina		–		7	–	4	–	0
Utah State		–		7	–	4	–	0
Air Force		–		6	–	4	–	0
Southern Miss		–		6	–	4	–	1
Northern Illinois		–		6	–	5	–	0
Rutgers		–		6	–	5	–	0
West Virginia		–		6	–	5	–	0
Pittsburgh		–		6	–	5	–	1
Colgate		–		5	–	5	–	0
Dayton		–		5	–	5	–	1
Xavier		–		5	–	5	–	1
Georgia Tech		–		5	–	6	–	0
Holy Cross		–		5	–	6	–	0
Miami (FL)		–		5	–	6	–	0
Cincinnati		–		4	–	7	–	0
Marshall		–		4	–	7	–	0
Navy		–		4	–	7	–	0
Southern Illinois		–		3	–	7	–	1
Villanova		–		3	–	8	–	0
Syracuse		–		2	–	9	–	0
Virginia Tech		–		2	–	9	–	0
Army		–		0	–	10	–	0
Florida State		–		0	–	11	–	0
Rankings from AP Poll

The 1973 Tampa Spartans football team represented the University of Tampa in the 1973 NCAA Division I football season. It was the Spartans' 37th season and they competed as an NCAA Division I independent. The team was led by head coach Dennis Fryzel, in his first year, and played their home games at Tampa Stadium in Tampa, Florida. They finished with a record of eight wins and three losses (8–3). Fryzel was hired on January 3, 1973, to serve as the replacement for Earle Bruce who resigned to become the head coach at Iowa State.

== Schedule ==
Date	Time	Opponent	Site	Result	Attendance	Source
September 15	7:30 p.m.	Toledo	Tampa Stadium; Tampa, FL	W 35–25	17,412	
September 21	7:30 p.m.	Xavier	Tampa Stadium; Tampa, FL	W 34–7	11,362	
September 29	7:38 p.m.	Kansas State	Tampa Stadium; Tampa, FL	L 0–17	25,578	
October 6	7:30 p.m.	Akron	Tampa Stadium; Tampa, FL	W 21–7	12,358	
October 13	7:32 p.m.	Villanova	Tampa Stadium; Tampa, FL	W 17–10	11,106	
October 20	8:30 p.m.	at Southern Illinois	McAndrew Stadium; Carbondale, IL	W 25–23	9,000	
October 27		Northern Michigan	Tampa Stadium; Tampa, FL	W 20–0	14,255	
November 10	8:30 p.m.	at West Texas State	Kimbrough Memorial Stadium; Canyon, TX	W 28–6	6,650	
November 17	7:34 p.m.	Chattanooga	Tampa Stadium; Tampa, FL	L 24–25	20,270	
November 24	2:30 p.m.	at Vanderbilt	Dudley Field; Nashville, TN	L 16–18	14,500	
December 1	7:38 p.m.	Rutgers	Tampa Stadium; Tampa, FL	W 34–6	17,600	
All times are in Eastern time
