= 1973 Villanova Wildcats football team =

American college football season

1973 Villanova Wildcats football
- Conference: Independent
- Record: 3–8
- Head coach: Lou Ferry (4th season)
- Offensive coordinator: Fred O'Connor (1st season)
- Defensive coordinator: John Rosenberg (2nd season)
- Captains: Joe Miller; John Givens
- Home stadium: Villanova Stadium

1973 NCAA Division I independents football records
	Conf.			Overall
Team	W	L	T	W		L		T
No. 1 Notre Dame		–		11	–	0	–	0
No. 5 Penn State		–		12	–	0	–	0
No. 9 Houston		–		11	–	1	–	0
Temple		–		9	–	1	–	0
No. 20 Tulane		–		9	–	3	–	0
Memphis State		–		8	–	3	–	0
Tampa		–		8	–	3	–	0
Boston College		–		7	–	4	–	0
South Carolina		–		7	–	4	–	0
Utah State		–		7	–	4	–	0
Air Force		–		6	–	4	–	0
Southern Miss		–		6	–	4	–	1
Northern Illinois		–		6	–	5	–	0
Rutgers		–		6	–	5	–	0
West Virginia		–		6	–	5	–	0
Pittsburgh		–		6	–	5	–	1
Colgate		–		5	–	5	–	0
Dayton		–		5	–	5	–	1
Xavier		–		5	–	5	–	1
Georgia Tech		–		5	–	6	–	0
Holy Cross		–		5	–	6	–	0
Miami (FL)		–		5	–	6	–	0
Cincinnati		–		4	–	7	–	0
Marshall		–		4	–	7	–	0
Navy		–		4	–	7	–	0
Southern Illinois		–		3	–	7	–	1
Villanova		–		3	–	8	–	0
Syracuse		–		2	–	9	–	0
Virginia Tech		–		2	–	9	–	0
Army		–		0	–	10	–	0
Florida State		–		0	–	11	–	0
Rankings from AP Poll

The 1973 Villanova Wildcats football team represented the Villanova University during the 1973 NCAA Division I football season. The head coach was Lou Ferry, coaching his fourth season with the Wildcats. The team played their home games at Villanova Stadium in Villanova, Pennsylvania.

== Schedule ==
Date	Time	Opponent	Site	Result	Attendance	Source
September 8		at Ole Miss	Mississippi Veterans Memorial Stadium; Jackson, MS	L 6–24	36,000	
September 15	1:00 p.m.	at UMass	Alumni Stadium; Amherst, MA	L 20–21	12,100	
September 22	1:34 p.m.	Cincinnati*	Villanova Stadium; Villanova, PA	W 14–7	11,500	
September 29	1:30 p.m.	at Maryland	Byrd Stadium; College Park, MD	L 3–31	31,260	
October 6	1:30 p.m.	at William & Mary	Cary Field; Williamsburg, VA	L 21–33	12,000–12,200	
October 13	7:32 p.m.	at Tampa	Tampa Stadium; Tampa, FL	L 10–17	11,106	
October 27	1:30 p.m.	at Boston College	Alumni Stadium; Chestnut Hill, MA	L 7–11	16,226	
November 3	1:30 p.m.	Delaware	Villanova Stadium; Villanova, PA (rivalry)	W 24–7	14,810	
November 10	1:31 p.m.	West Chester	Villanova Stadium; Villanova, PA	W 42–14	11,407	
November 17	2:00 p.m.	at Xavier	Xavier Stadium; Cincinnati, OH	L 6–13	6,564	
November 24	1:30 p.m.	Temple	Villanova Stadium; Villanova, PA (Mayor's Cup)	L 0–34	13,350	
*Non-conference game; All times are in Eastern time
