= 1973 Northern Illinois Huskies football team =

American college football season

1973 Northern Illinois Huskies football
- Conference: Independent
- Record: 6–5
- Head coach: Jerry Ippoliti (3rd season)
- MVPs: Mark Kellar; Jeff Eckmann
- Captains: Mark Kellar; Don Martin; Rich Marks; Dan Adams
- Home stadium: Huskie Stadium

1973 NCAA Division I independents football records
	Conf.			Overall
Team	W	L	T	W		L		T
No. 1 Notre Dame		–		11	–	0	–	0
No. 5 Penn State		–		12	–	0	–	0
No. 9 Houston		–		11	–	1	–	0
Temple		–		9	–	1	–	0
No. 20 Tulane		–		9	–	3	–	0
Memphis State		–		8	–	3	–	0
Tampa		–		8	–	3	–	0
Boston College		–		7	–	4	–	0
South Carolina		–		7	–	4	–	0
Utah State		–		7	–	4	–	0
Air Force		–		6	–	4	–	0
Southern Miss		–		6	–	4	–	1
Northern Illinois		–		6	–	5	–	0
Rutgers		–		6	–	5	–	0
West Virginia		–		6	–	5	–	0
Pittsburgh		–		6	–	5	–	1
Colgate		–		5	–	5	–	0
Dayton		–		5	–	5	–	1
Xavier		–		5	–	5	–	1
Georgia Tech		–		5	–	6	–	0
Holy Cross		–		5	–	6	–	0
Miami (FL)		–		5	–	6	–	0
Cincinnati		–		4	–	7	–	0
Marshall		–		4	–	7	–	0
Navy		–		4	–	7	–	0
Southern Illinois		–		3	–	7	–	1
Villanova		–		3	–	8	–	0
Syracuse		–		2	–	9	–	0
Virginia Tech		–		2	–	9	–	0
Army		–		0	–	10	–	0
Florida State		–		0	–	11	–	0
Rankings from AP Poll

The 1973 Northern Illinois Huskies football team represented Northern Illinois University as an independent during the 1973 NCAA Division I football season. Led by third-year head coach Jerry Ippoliti, the Huskies compiled a record of 6–5. Northern Illinois played home games at Huskie Stadium in DeKalb, Illinois.

== Schedule ==
Date	Time	Opponent	Site	Result	Attendance	Source
September 8	1:30 p.m.	Indiana State	Huskie Stadium; DeKalb, IL	W 42–24	9,000	
September 15	1:33 p.m.	Southern Illinois	Huskie Stadium; DeKalb, IL	W 34–28	10,000	
September 22	12:30 p.m.	at Western Michigan	Waldo Stadium; Kalamazoo, MI	L 14–28	19,400	
September 29	7:30 p.m.	at West Texas State	Kimbrough Memorial Stadium; Canyon, TX	W 21–14	13,800	
October 6	9:36 p.m.	at Fresno State	Ratcliffe Stadium; Fresno, CA	W 24–15	6,272	
October 13	1:30 p.m.	Marshall	Huskie Stadium; DeKalb, IL	L 36–39	7,500	
October 20	1:30 p.m.	Ball State	Huskie Stadium; DeKalb, IL (rivalry)	W 45–17	15,739	
October 27	1:30 p.m.	at Illinois State	Hancock Stadium; Normal, IL	W 28–14	6,000	
November 3	1:30 p.m.	Western Illinois	Huskie Stadium; DeKalb, IL	L 27–30	12,500–12,750	
November 10	1:00 p.m.	at Xavier	Xavier Stadium; Cincinnati, OH	L 36–40	4,831	
November 17	12:30 p.m.	at Bowling Green	Doyt Perry Stadium; Bowling Green, OH	L 20–21	12,696	
All times are in Central time

== Roster ==
1973 Northern Illinois Huskies football team roster
Players
Coaches
Offense

Pos.	#	Name	Class
QB	14	Jerry Golsteyn	So
RB	31	Mark Kellar	Sr
RB	24	Jerry Latin	Jr

Defense

Pos.	#	Name	Class
S	22	Richard Marks	Sr
DT	79	Jerry Meyers	So

Special teams

Pos.	#	Name	Class

Head coach

- Jerry Ippoliti

Coordinators/assistant coaches

Legend

- (C) Team captain
- (S) Suspended
- (I) Ineligible
- Injured
- Redshirt
