= 1973 Pittsburgh Panthers football team =

American college football season

1973 Pittsburgh Panthers football

Fiesta Bowl, L 7–28 Arizona State
- Conference: Independent
- Record: 6–5–1
- Head coach: Johnny Majors (1st season)
- Offensive coordinator: George Haffner (1st season)
- Offensive scheme: I formation, Split backs
- Defensive coordinator: Jackie Sherrill (1st season)
- Base defense: 4–4
- Home stadium: Pitt Stadium

1973 NCAA Division I independents football records
	Conf.			Overall
Team	W	L	T	W		L		T
No. 1 Notre Dame		–		11	–	0	–	0
No. 5 Penn State		–		12	–	0	–	0
No. 9 Houston		–		11	–	1	–	0
Temple		–		9	–	1	–	0
No. 20 Tulane		–		9	–	3	–	0
Memphis State		–		8	–	3	–	0
Tampa		–		8	–	3	–	0
Boston College		–		7	–	4	–	0
South Carolina		–		7	–	4	–	0
Utah State		–		7	–	4	–	0
Air Force		–		6	–	4	–	0
Southern Miss		–		6	–	4	–	1
Northern Illinois		–		6	–	5	–	0
Rutgers		–		6	–	5	–	0
West Virginia		–		6	–	5	–	0
Pittsburgh		–		6	–	5	–	1
Colgate		–		5	–	5	–	0
Dayton		–		5	–	5	–	1
Xavier		–		5	–	5	–	1
Georgia Tech		–		5	–	6	–	0
Holy Cross		–		5	–	6	–	0
Miami (FL)		–		5	–	6	–	0
Cincinnati		–		4	–	7	–	0
Marshall		–		4	–	7	–	0
Navy		–		4	–	7	–	0
Southern Illinois		–		3	–	7	–	1
Villanova		–		3	–	8	–	0
Syracuse		–		2	–	9	–	0
Virginia Tech		–		2	–	9	–	0
Army		–		0	–	10	–	0
Florida State		–		0	–	11	–	0
Rankings from AP Poll

The 1973 Pittsburgh Panthers football team represented the University of Pittsburgh as an independent during the 1973 NCAA Division I football season. Led by first-year head coach Johnny Majors, the Panthers compiled a record of 6–5–1. At the conclusion of the season, Pittsburgh advanced to the Fiesta Bowl and were defeated by Arizona State. The team played home games at Pitt Stadium in Pittsburgh.

== Schedule ==
Date	Time	Opponent	Rank	Site	TV	Result	Attendance	Source
September 15	2:00 p.m.	at Georgia		Sanford Stadium; Athens, GA		T 7–7	52,005	
September 22	1:30 p.m.	Baylor		Pitt Stadium; Pittsburgh, PA		L 14–20	28,332	
September 29	2:30 p.m.	at Northwestern		Dyche Stadium; Evanston, IL		W 21–14	24,462	
October 6	1:30 p.m.	Tulane		Pitt Stadium; Pittsburgh, PA		L 6–24	25,054	
October 13	1:30 p.m.	at West Virginia		Mountaineer Field; Morgantown, WV (Backyard Brawl)		W 35–7	37,000	
October 20	1:30 p.m.	at Boston College		Alumni Stadium; Chestnut Hill, MA		W 28–14	23,219	
October 27	1:33 p.m.	Navy^{†}		Pitt Stadium; Pittsburgh, PA		W 22–17	33,136	
November 3	1:30 p.m.	Syracuse		Pitt Stadium; Pittsburgh, PA (rivalry)		W 28–14	24,932	
November 10	1:30 p.m.	No. 5 Notre Dame	No. 20	Pitt Stadium; Pittsburgh, PA (rivalry)		L 10–31	56,593	
November 17	1:30 p.m.	at Army		Michie Stadium; West Point, NY		W 34–0	33,264	
November 24	1:30 p.m.	at No. 6 Penn State	No. 20	Beaver Stadium; University Park, PA (rivalry)		L 13–35	56,600	
December 21	8:00 p.m.	vs. No. 10 Arizona State		Sun Devil Stadium; Tempe, AZ (Fiesta Bowl)	Mizlou	L 7–28	50,878	
^{†}Homecoming; Rankings from AP Poll released prior to the game; All times are in Eastern time

== Game summaries ==
=== Penn State ===
Penn State vs. Pitt

Quarter	1	2	3	4	Total
#20 Pitt	0	13	0	0	13
#6 Penn State	3	0	8	24	35

at Beaver Stadium • University Park, PA

- Date: Saturday, November 24, 1973
- Game attendance: 56,600

Game information

First quarter

- PSU — Chris Bahr 40-yard field goal

Second quarter

- Pitt — Tony Dorsett 14-yard run (Carson Long kick)
- Pitt — Carson Long 31-yard field goal
- Pitt — Carson Long 50-yard field goal

Third quarter

- PSU — Bob Nagle 1-yard run (Hayman pass from Shuman)

Fourth quarter

- PSU — John Cappelletti 5-yard run (Bahr kick)
- PSU — Tom Hull 27-yard interception return (Bahr kick)
- PSU — Chuck Herd 32-yard pass from Tom Shuman (Bahr kick)
- PSU — Chris Bahr 45-yard field goal

Team	Category	Player	Statistics
Pitt	Passing	Billy Daniels	5/19, 122 Yds, 2 INT
Pitt	Rushing	Tony Dorsett	20 Rush, 77 Yds, 1 TD
Pitt	Receiving		
PSU	Passing	Tom Shuman	7/17, 96 Yds, 1 TD
PSU	Rushing	John Cappelletti	37 Rush, 161 Yds, 1 TD
PSU	Receiving	Chuck Herd	1 Rec, 32 Yds, 1 TD

Penn State overcame a 13–3 halftime deficit with a dominant second-half performance to defeat Pittsburgh 35–13 on November 24, 1973, before 56,600 fans at Beaver Stadium. The Panthers controlled much of the first half behind freshman Tony Dorsett, who scored on a 14-yard touchdown run and finished with 77 rushing yards. Pitt also added two field goals by Carson Long while limiting the Nittany Lions to a single Chris Bahr field goal before intermission.

Penn State's defense turned the game in the third quarter, holding Pittsburgh to just 15 yards and no first downs in the period. Penn State narrowed Pitt's lead to 13-11 when Fullback Bob Nagle scored from 1 yard out and Hayman added the 2-point conversion on a reception. John Cappelletti put Penn State ahead for good on 5-yard touchdown and the game was sealed when Linebacker Tom Hull tallied a 27-yard interception return for a touchdown.

Cappelletti, a leading Heisman Trophy candidate, rushed for 161 yards on 37 carries and was named the game's outstanding player. The victory capped an undefeated 11–0 regular season for Penn State and secured its bid to the Orange Bowl.

== Personnel ==
=== Roster ===
1973 Pittsburgh Panthers football team roster
Players
Coaches
Offense

Pos.	#	Name	Class
OT	76	Dave Wannstedt	Sr

Defense

Pos.	#	Name	Class
DT		Gary Burley	Jr
DT	75	Glenn Hyde	Sr
DE	85	Tom Perko	So

Special teams

Pos.	#	Name	Class

Head coach

- Johnny Majors

Coordinators/assistant coaches

Legend

- (C) Team captain
- (S) Suspended
- (I) Ineligible
- Injured
- Redshirt

=== Coaching staff ===
1973 Pittsburgh Panthers football staff
Coaching staff: Johnny Majors – Head coach; Jackie Sherrill – Assistant head coach/defensive coordinator; George Haffner – Offensive coordinator; Joe Avezzano – Offensive line; Jim Dyar – Defensive line; Larry Holton – Defense; Harry Jones – Offensive backs; Bob Leahy – Head Freshman Coach; Joe Madden – Defensive secondary; Bob Roper – Receivers; Bob Matey – Freshman Defensive Line; Keith Schroeder – Scouting	Support staff: Albert Smith – Executive Assistant Director of Athletics

== Team players drafted into the NFL ==
Player	Position	Round	Pick	NFL club
Rod Kirby	Linebacker	11	278	Buffalo Bills
Jim Buckmon	Defensive end	12	295	New Orleans Saints
Dave Wannstedt	Tackle	15	376	Green Bay Packers
