= Jerry Ippoliti =

American football player, coach, and college athletics administrator

Biographical details
- Born: c. 1935

Playing career
- 1956–1957: Miami (OH)
- Position: End

Coaching career (HC unless noted)
- 1964–1965: Coshocton HS (OH)
- 1966–1968: Buffalo (backfield)
- 1969–1970: Northern Illinois (backfield)
- 1971–1975: Northern Illinois

Administrative career (AD unless noted)
- 1994–1999: MAC (commissioner)

Head coaching record
- Overall: 25–29–1 (college)

Jerry Ippoliti (born c. 1935) is an American former football player, coach, and college athletics administrator. He served as the head football coach at the Northern Illinois University from 1971 until 1975, compiling a record of 25–29–1. Ippoliti was the commissioner of the Mid-American Conference from 1994 to 1999.

Ippoliti played college football at Miami University.

== Head coaching record ==
Year	Team	Overall	Conference	Standing	Bowl/playoffs
Northern Illinois Huskies (NCAA University Division / Division I independent) (1971–1974)
1971	Northern Illinois	5–5–1			
1972	Northern Illinois	7–4			
1973	Northern Illinois	6–5			
1974	Northern Illinois	4–7			
Northern Illinois Huskies (Mid-American Conference) (1975)
1975	Northern Illinois	3–8	2–3	7th	
Northern Illinois:		25–29–1	2–3		
Total:		25–29–1			
