= 1973 West Virginia Mountaineers football team =

American college football season

1973 West Virginia Mountaineers football
- Conference: Independent
- Record: 6–5
- Head coach: Bobby Bowden (4th season)
- Home stadium: Mountaineer Field

1973 NCAA Division I independents football records
	Conf.			Overall
Team	W	L	T	W		L		T
No. 1 Notre Dame		–		11	–	0	–	0
No. 5 Penn State		–		12	–	0	–	0
No. 9 Houston		–		11	–	1	–	0
Temple		–		9	–	1	–	0
No. 20 Tulane		–		9	–	3	–	0
Memphis State		–		8	–	3	–	0
Tampa		–		8	–	3	–	0
Boston College		–		7	–	4	–	0
South Carolina		–		7	–	4	–	0
Utah State		–		7	–	4	–	0
Air Force		–		6	–	4	–	0
Southern Miss		–		6	–	4	–	1
Northern Illinois		–		6	–	5	–	0
Rutgers		–		6	–	5	–	0
West Virginia		–		6	–	5	–	0
Pittsburgh		–		6	–	5	–	1
Colgate		–		5	–	5	–	0
Dayton		–		5	–	5	–	1
Xavier		–		5	–	5	–	1
Georgia Tech		–		5	–	6	–	0
Holy Cross		–		5	–	6	–	0
Miami (FL)		–		5	–	6	–	0
Cincinnati		–		4	–	7	–	0
Marshall		–		4	–	7	–	0
Navy		–		4	–	7	–	0
Southern Illinois		–		3	–	7	–	1
Villanova		–		3	–	8	–	0
Syracuse		–		2	–	9	–	0
Virginia Tech		–		2	–	9	–	0
Army		–		0	–	10	–	0
Florida State		–		0	–	11	–	0
Rankings from AP Poll

The 1973 West Virginia Mountaineers football team represented West Virginia University in the 1973 NCAA Division I football season. It was the Mountaineers' 81st overall season and they competed as an independent. The team was led by head coach Bobby Bowden, in his fourth year, and played their home games at Mountaineer Field in Morgantown, West Virginia. They finished the season with a record of 6–5.

== Schedule ==
Date	Time	Opponent	Rank	Site	Result	Attendance	Source
September 15		at Maryland		Byrd Stadium; College Park, MD (rivalry)	W 20–13	35,112	
September 22		Virginia Tech		Mountaineer Field; Morgantown, WV (rivalry)	W 24–10	33,000	
September 29		at Illinois		Memorial Stadium; Champaign, IL	W 17–10	48,107	
October 6		Indiana^{†}	No. 20	Mountaineer Field; Morgantown, WV	L 14–28	37,000	
October 13		Pittsburgh		Mountaineer Field; Morgantown, WV (rivalry)	L 7–35	37,000	
October 20		at Richmond		City Stadium; Richmond, VA	L 17–38	21,172	
October 27		at No. 5 Penn State		Beaver Stadium; University Park, PA (rivalry)	L 14–62	59,138	
November 2	8:03 p.m.	at Miami (FL)		Miami Orange Bowl; Miami, FL	W 20–14	24,890	
November 10		Boston College		Mountaineer Field; Morgantown, WV	L 13–25	22,500	
November 17		Virginia		Mountaineer Field; Morgantown, WV	W 42–17	26,000	
November 24		at Syracuse		Archbold Stadium; Syracuse, NY (rivalry)	W 24–14	12,917	
^{†}Homecoming; Rankings from AP Poll released prior to the game; All times are in Eastern time

== Game summaries ==
=== at Penn State ===
West Virginia Mountaineers at No. 5 Penn State Nittany Lions

Quarter	1	2	3	4	Total
West Virginia	0	14	0	0	14
Penn St	14	14	14	20	62

at Beaver Stadium, University Park, Pennsylvania

- Date: October 27, 1973
- Game weather: Sunny, 60 °F (16 °C)
- Game attendance: 59,138
- Referee: Raymond Bower
- Box Score

Team	Category	Player	Statistics
WVU	Passing	Ben Williams Jr.	6/22, 166 Yds, TD, 4 INT
WVU	Rushing	Dwyane Woods	14 Rush, 26 Yds
WVU	Receiving	Danny Buggs	1 Rec, 96 Yds, TD
PSU	Passing	Tom Shuman	6/18, 175 Yds, TD
PSU	Rushing	John Cappelletti	24 Rush, 130 Yds, 4 TD
PSU	Receiving	Chuck Herd	1 Rec, 76 Yds, TD

External videos
- 1973 Penn State vs. West Virginia (Game footage – no audio)

Scoring summary

Quarter	Time	Drive			Team	Scoring information	Score	
Quarter	Time	Plays	Yards	TOP	Team	Scoring information	WVU	PSU
1					PSU–	John Cappelletti 10-yard touchdown run, Chris Bahr kick good	0	7
1					PSU	John Cappelletti 2-yard touchdown run, Chris Bahr kick good	0	14
2					PSU	Chuck Herd 76-yard touchdown reception from Tom Shuman, Chris Bahr kick good	0	21
2					WVU	Danny Buggs 96-yard touchdown reception from Ben Williams Jr., Frank Nester kick good	7	21
2					PSU	John Cappelletti 5-yard touchdown run, Chris Bahr kick good	7	28
2					WVU	Kickoff returned 95 yards for touchdown by Artie Owens, Frank Nester kick good	14	28
3					PSU	Bob Nagle 53-yard touchdown run, Chris Bahr kick good	14	35
3					PSU	John Cappelletti 2-yard touchdown run, Chris Bahr kick good	14	42
4					PSU	Rusty Boyle 4-yard touchdown run, Chris Bahr kick good	14	49
4					PSU	Mike Pirogowicz 5-yard touchdown run, kick no good	14	55
4					PSU	Interception returned 25 yards for touchdown by Greg Buttle, John Reihner kick good	14	62
"TOP" = time of possession. For other American football terms, see Glossary of American football.							14	62

== Roster ==
1973 West Virginia Mountaineers football team roster
Players			Coaches
Offense: Pos. / # / Name / Class; WR / 8 / Danny Buggs / Jr	Defense: Pos. / # / Name / Class; DT / 90 / Jeff Merrow / Jr	Special teams: Pos. / # / Name / Class	Head coach: Bobby Bowden; Coordinators/assistant coaches Legend: (C) Team captain; (S) Suspended; (I) Ineligible; Injured; Redshirt
