= 1973 Houston Cougars football team =

American college football season

1973 Houston Cougars football
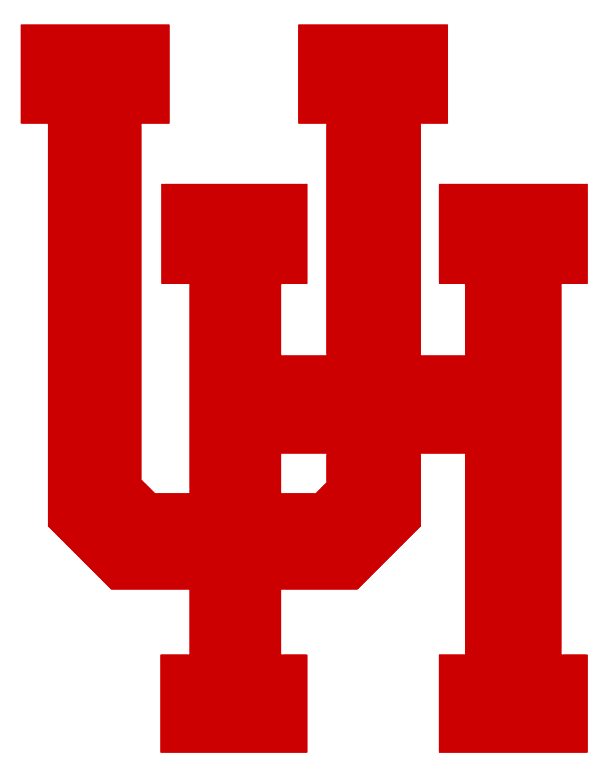

Astro-Bluebonnet Bowl champion

Astro-Bluebonnet Bowl, W 47–7 vs. Tulane
- Conference: Independent

Ranking
- Coaches: No. 13
- AP: No. 9
- Record: 11–1
- Head coach: Bill Yeoman (12th season)
- Offensive scheme: Houston Veer
- Defensive coordinator: Don Todd (2nd season)
- Captains: Ken Baugh; D. C. Nobles; Deryl McGallion
- Home stadium: Houston Astrodome

1973 NCAA Division I independents football records
	Conf.			Overall
Team	W	L	T	W		L		T
No. 1 Notre Dame		–		11	–	0	–	0
No. 5 Penn State		–		12	–	0	–	0
No. 9 Houston		–		11	–	1	–	0
Temple		–		9	–	1	–	0
No. 20 Tulane		–		9	–	3	–	0
Memphis State		–		8	–	3	–	0
Tampa		–		8	–	3	–	0
Boston College		–		7	–	4	–	0
South Carolina		–		7	–	4	–	0
Utah State		–		7	–	4	–	0
Air Force		–		6	–	4	–	0
Southern Miss		–		6	–	4	–	1
Northern Illinois		–		6	–	5	–	0
Rutgers		–		6	–	5	–	0
West Virginia		–		6	–	5	–	0
Pittsburgh		–		6	–	5	–	1
Colgate		–		5	–	5	–	0
Dayton		–		5	–	5	–	1
Xavier		–		5	–	5	–	1
Georgia Tech		–		5	–	6	–	0
Holy Cross		–		5	–	6	–	0
Miami (FL)		–		5	–	6	–	0
Cincinnati		–		4	–	7	–	0
Marshall		–		4	–	7	–	0
Navy		–		4	–	7	–	0
Southern Illinois		–		3	–	7	–	1
Villanova		–		3	–	8	–	0
Syracuse		–		2	–	9	–	0
Virginia Tech		–		2	–	9	–	0
Army		–		0	–	10	–	0
Florida State		–		0	–	11	–	0
Rankings from AP Poll

The 1973 Houston Cougars football team, also known as the Houston Cougars, Houston, or UH, represented the University of Houston in the 1973 NCAA Division I football season. It was the 28th year of season play for Houston. The team was coached by 12th-year head coach Bill Yeoman who was inducted into the College Football Hall of Fame in 2001. The team played its home games in the Astrodome, a 50,000-person capacity stadium off-campus in Houston at the Astrodomain. Houston competed as a member of the NCAA in the University Division, independent of any athletic conference. It was their fourteenth year of doing so. The Cougars had been admitted to the Southwest Conference two years prior, but were ineligible for conference play until the 1976 season. After completion of the regular season, the Cougars were invited to the Astro-Bluebonnet Bowl where they defeated the Tulane Green Wave.

== Schedule ==
Date	Time	Opponent	Rank	Site	TV	Result	Attendance	Source
September 15		Rice	No. 18	Houston Astrodome; Houston, TX (rivalry)		W 24–6	43,917	
September 21		South Carolina	No. 16	Houston Astrodome; Houston, TX		W 27–19	24,019	
September 29		at Memphis State	No. 15	Memphis Memorial Stadium; Memphis, TN		W 35–21	40,126	
October 6		at San Diego State	No. 14	San Diego Stadium; San Diego, CA		W 14–9	37,489	
October 12		Virginia Tech	No. 14	Houston Astrodome; Houston, TX		W 54–27	27,103	
October 19	7:03 p.m.	at Miami (FL)	No. 14	Miami Orange Bowl; Miami, FL		W 30–7	29,340	
October 27		at Auburn	No. 12	Jordan–Hare Stadium; Auburn, AL		L 0–7	58,426	
November 3		Florida State^{†}	No. 18	Houston Astrodome; Houston, TX		W 34–3	27,587	
November 10		at Colorado State	No. 15	Hughes Stadium; Fort Collins, CO		W 28–20	17,532	
November 24		Wyoming	No. 14	Houston Astrodome; Houston, TX		W 35–0	18,441	
December 1		Tulsa	No. 14	Houston Astrodome; Houston, TX		W 35–16	21,500–21,590	
December 29		No. 17 Tulane	No. 14	Houston Astrodome; Houston, TX (Astro-Bluebonnet Bowl)	ABC	W 47–7	44,358	
^{†}Homecoming; Rankings from AP Poll released prior to the game; All times are in Central time

== Coaching staff ==
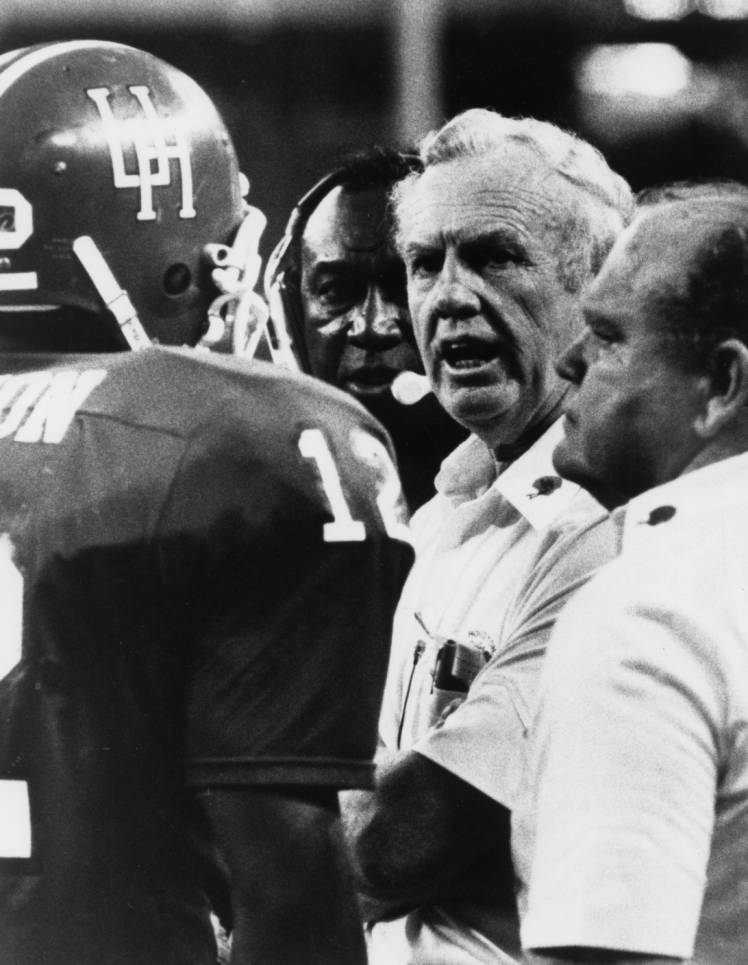
Head coach Bill Yeoman

Name	Position	Alma mater (year)	Year at Houston
Bill Yeoman	Head coach, offensive coordinator	Army (1948)	12th
Don Todd	Freshman assistant coach	Hardin–Simmons (1964)	2nd
Melvin Brown	Offensive backs coach	Oklahoma (1954)	11th
Billy Willingham	Offensive line coach	TCU (1951)	8th
Barry Sides	Offensive line coach, defensive ends coach	Houston (1968)	5th
Clarence Daniel	Defensive backs coach	Huron (1955)	2nd
Larry French	Defensive coordinator	Colorado State (1965)	4th
Joe Arenas	Wide receivers coach	Nebraska-Omaha (1951)	11th
Carroll Schultz	Freshmen coach	Louisiana Tech (1948)	12th
Bobby Baldwin	Freshmen coach	Houston (1958)	9th
