= 1973 Tulane Green Wave football team =

American college football season

1973 Tulane Green Wave football

Astro-Bluebonnet Bowl, L 7–47 vs. Houston
- Conference: Independent

Ranking
- Coaches: No. 15
- AP: No. 20
- Record: 9–3
- Head coach: Bennie Ellender (3rd season)
- Offensive scheme: Multiple
- Base defense: 5–2 Monster
- Home stadium: Tulane Stadium

1973 NCAA Division I independents football records
| | Conf. | | | Overall |
| Team | W | L | T | W | | L | | T |
|---|---|---|---|---|---|---|---|---|
| No. 1 Notre Dame | | – | | 11 | – | 0 | – | 0 |
| No. 5 Penn State | | – | | 12 | – | 0 | – | 0 |
| No. 9 Houston | | – | | 11 | – | 1 | – | 0 |
| Temple | | – | | 9 | – | 1 | – | 0 |
| No. 20 Tulane | | – | | 9 | – | 3 | – | 0 |
| Memphis State | | – | | 8 | – | 3 | – | 0 |
| Tampa | | – | | 8 | – | 3 | – | 0 |
| Boston College | | – | | 7 | – | 4 | – | 0 |
| South Carolina | | – | | 7 | – | 4 | – | 0 |
| Utah State | | – | | 7 | – | 4 | – | 0 |
| Air Force | | – | | 6 | – | 4 | – | 0 |
| Southern Miss | | – | | 6 | – | 4 | – | 1 |
| Northern Illinois | | – | | 6 | – | 5 | – | 0 |
| Rutgers | | – | | 6 | – | 5 | – | 0 |
| West Virginia | | – | | 6 | – | 5 | – | 0 |
| Pittsburgh | | – | | 6 | – | 5 | – | 1 |
| Colgate | | – | | 5 | – | 5 | – | 0 |
| Dayton | | – | | 5 | – | 5 | – | 1 |
| Xavier | | – | | 5 | – | 5 | – | 1 |
| Georgia Tech | | – | | 5 | – | 6 | – | 0 |
| Holy Cross | | – | | 5 | – | 6 | – | 0 |
| Miami (FL) | | – | | 5 | – | 6 | – | 0 |
| Cincinnati | | – | | 4 | – | 7 | – | 0 |
| Marshall | | – | | 4 | – | 7 | – | 0 |
| Navy | | – | | 4 | – | 7 | – | 0 |
| Southern Illinois | | – | | 3 | – | 7 | – | 1 |
| Villanova | | – | | 3 | – | 8 | – | 0 |
| Syracuse | | – | | 2 | – | 9 | – | 0 |
| Virginia Tech | | – | | 2 | – | 9 | – | 0 |
| Army | | – | | 0 | – | 10 | – | 0 |
| Florida State | | – | | 0 | – | 11 | – | 0 |
Rankings from AP Poll

The 1973 Tulane Green Wave football team was an American football team that represented Tulane University during the 1973 NCAA Division I football season as an independent. In their third year under head coach Bennie Ellender, the team compiled a 9–3 record and lost to Houston in the Astro-Bluebonnet Bowl. The Green Wave's 14–0 victory over LSU was its first over the Bayou Bengals since 1948, and first in New Orleans over LSU since 1943.

== Schedule ==
| Date | Time | Opponent | Rank | Site | TV | Result | Attendance | Source |
|---|---|---|---|---|---|---|---|---|
| September 22 | | Boston College | | Tulane Stadium; New Orleans, LA | | W 21–16 | 33,880 | |
| September 29 | | VMI | | Tulane Stadium; New Orleans, LA | | W 42–0 | 25,037 | |
| October 6 | | at Pittsburgh | | Pitt Stadium; Pittsburgh, PA | | W 24–6 | 25,054 | |
| October 13 | | at Duke | No. 18 | Wallace Wade Stadium; Durham, NC | | W 24–17 | 20,500 | |
| October 20 | | North Carolina | No. 17 | Tulane Stadium; New Orleans, LA | | W 16–0 | 38,502 | |
| October 27 | | Georgia Tech | No. 15 | Tulane Stadium; New Orleans, LA | | W 23–14 | 66,286 | |
| November 3 | | at Kentucky | No. 14 | Commonwealth Stadium; Lexington, KY | | L 7–34 | 49,360 | |
| November 10 | 8:35 p.m. | Navy^{†} | | Tulane Stadium; New Orleans, LA | | W 17–15 | 40,134–40,135 | |
| November 17 | | Vanderbilt | | Tulane Stadium; New Orleans, LA | | W 24–3 | 31,199 | |
| November 24 | | at Maryland | No. 17 | Byrd Stadium; College Park, MD | | L 9–42 | 19,416 | |
| December 1 | | No. 8 LSU | | Tulane Stadium; New Orleans, LA (Battle for the Rag) | | W 14–0 | 86,598 | |
| December 29 | | vs. No. 14 Houston | No. 17 | Houston Astrodome; Houston, TX (Astro-Bluebonnet Bowl) | ABC | L 7–47 | 44,358 | |
^{†}Homecoming; Rankings from AP Poll released prior to the game; All times are in Central time
