= 1973 Rutgers Scarlet Knights football team =

American college football season

1973 Rutgers Scarlet Knights football
- Conference: Independent
- Record: 6–5
- Head coach: Frank R. Burns (1st season)
- Captains: Andrew Tighe; John Witkowski
- Home stadium: Rutgers Stadium

1973 NCAA Division I independents football records
	Conf.			Overall
Team	W	L	T	W		L		T
No. 1 Notre Dame		–		11	–	0	–	0
No. 5 Penn State		–		12	–	0	–	0
No. 9 Houston		–		11	–	1	–	0
Temple		–		9	–	1	–	0
No. 20 Tulane		–		9	–	3	–	0
Memphis State		–		8	–	3	–	0
Tampa		–		8	–	3	–	0
Boston College		–		7	–	4	–	0
South Carolina		–		7	–	4	–	0
Utah State		–		7	–	4	–	0
Air Force		–		6	–	4	–	0
Southern Miss		–		6	–	4	–	1
Northern Illinois		–		6	–	5	–	0
Rutgers		–		6	–	5	–	0
West Virginia		–		6	–	5	–	0
Pittsburgh		–		6	–	5	–	1
Colgate		–		5	–	5	–	0
Dayton		–		5	–	5	–	1
Xavier		–		5	–	5	–	1
Georgia Tech		–		5	–	6	–	0
Holy Cross		–		5	–	6	–	0
Miami (FL)		–		5	–	6	–	0
Cincinnati		–		4	–	7	–	0
Marshall		–		4	–	7	–	0
Navy		–		4	–	7	–	0
Southern Illinois		–		3	–	7	–	1
Villanova		–		3	–	8	–	0
Syracuse		–		2	–	9	–	0
Virginia Tech		–		2	–	9	–	0
Army		–		0	–	10	–	0
Florida State		–		0	–	11	–	0
Rankings from AP Poll

The 1973 Rutgers Scarlet Knights football team represented Rutgers University as an independent during the 1973 NCAA Division I football season. In their first season under head coach Frank R. Burns, the Scarlet Knights compiled a 6–5 record. The team outscored their opponents 245 to 208. The team's statistical leaders included John Piccirillo with 415 passing yards, J. J. Jennings with 1,353 rushing yards, and Tom Sweeney with 479 receiving yards.

== Schedule ==
Date	Time	Opponent	Site	Result	Attendance	Source
September 22		at Lehigh	Taylor Stadium; Bethlehem, PA	W 31–13	12,000	
September 29		at Princeton	Palmer Stadium; Princeton, NJ (rivalry)	W 39–14	27,000	
October 6		UMass	Rutgers Stadium; Piscataway, NJ	L 22–25	11,000	
October 13		Lafayette	Rutgers Stadium; Piscataway, NJ	W 35–6	10,000	
October 20		Delaware	Rutgers Stadium; Piscataway, NJ	W 24–7	21,000	
October 27		Columbia	Rutgers Stadium; Piscataway, NJ	W 28–2	16,500	
November 3		at Connecticut	Memorial Stadium; Storrs, CT	L 19–27	13,793	
November 10	3:02 p.m.	at Air Force	Falcon Stadium; Colorado Springs, CO	L 14–31	27,149	
November 17		at Holy Cross	Fitton Field; Worcester, MA	W 27–7	14,881	
November 24		Colgate	Rutgers Stadium; Piscataway, NJ	L 0–42	12,000	
December 1	7:38 p.m.	at Tampa	Tampa Stadium; Tampa, FL	L 6–34	17,600	
All times are in Eastern time

== Roster ==
1973 Rutgers Scarlet Knights football team roster
Players
Coaches
Offense

Pos.	#	Name	Class
TE	88	Doug Davis	Sr
TE	81	Kent Hall	Sr
RB	36	Jim Jennings	Sr

Defense

Pos.	#	Name	Class
S	21	Ed Jones	Jr

Special teams

Pos.	#	Name	Class

Head coach

- John F. Bateman

Coordinators/assistant coaches

Legend

- (C) Team captain
- (S) Suspended
- (I) Ineligible
- Injured
- Redshirt
