= Evan Jolitz =

American football player (born 1951)

No. 57
- Position: Linebacker

Personal information
- Born: July 26, 1951 (age 75); Lincoln, Nebraska, U.S.
- Listed height: 6 ft 2 in (1.88 m)
- Listed weight: 225 lb (102 kg)

Career information
- High school: St. Marys (OH) Memorial
- College: Xavier, Cincinnati
- NFL draft: 1974: 3rd round, 73rd overall pick

Career history
- Cincinnati Bengals (1974); Calgary Stampeders (1975–1976)
- Stats at Pro Football Reference

Evan Jolitz (born July 26, 1951) is an American former professional football linebacker. He played for the Cincinnati Bengals in 1974.
