= 1973 Astro-Bluebonnet Bowl =

Tulane Green Wave	Houston Cougars
(9–2)	(10–1)
7	47
Head coach: Bennie Ellender	Head coach: Bill Yeoman
AP / Coaches; 17 / 15	AP / Coaches; 14 / 13
	1	2	3	4	Total
Tulane	0	7	0	0	7
Houston	7	14	14	12	47
- Date: December 29, 1973
- Season: 1973
- Stadium: Houston Astrodome
- Location: Houston, Texas
- Attendance: 44,358

United States TV coverage
- Network: ABC
- Announcers: Keith Jackson and Lee Grosscup

The 1973 Astro-Bluebonnet Bowl, part of the 1973 bowl game season, took place on December 29, 1973, at the Houston Astrodome in Houston, Texas. The competing teams were the Tulane Green Wave and Houston Cougars, with each competing as a football independent. Houston won the game 47–7.

== Teams ==
=== Houston ===
The 1973 Houston squad finished the regular season with a 10–1 record with its lone loss coming against Auburn. The 10–1 record was the best recorded in the school's history to that point. The appearance marked the third for Houston in the Astro-Bluebonnet Bowl, and their fifth overall bowl game.

=== Tulane ===
The 1973 Tulane squad finished the regular season with a 9–2 record with losses coming against Kentucky and Maryland. Prior to victory over Vanderbilt, the Green Wave accepted an invitation to play in the Astro-Bluebonnet Bowl. The appearance marked the first for Tulane in the Astro-Bluebonnet Bowl, and their fifth overall bowl game.

== Game summary ==
- Houston - Marshall Johnson 75 run (Ricky Terrell kick), 12:13 remaining in the 1st quarter
- Houston – Leonard Parker 1-yard touchdown run (Ricky Terrell kick), 8:41 remaining in the 2nd quarter
- Houston – Leonard Parker 3-yard touchdown run (Ricky Terrell kick), 1:24 remaining in the 2nd quarter
- Tulane – Tom Fortner 32-yard touchdown pass from Buddy Gilbert (David Falgoust kick), 1:06 remaining in the 2nd quarter
- Houston – Nobles 2-yard touchdown run (Ricky Terrell kick), 6:42 remaining in the 3rd quarter
- Houston – Donnie McGraw 1-yard touchdown run (Ricky Terrell kick), 5:28 remaining in the 3rd quarter
- Houston – Donnie McGraw 32-yard touchdown run (kick failed), 13:41 remaining in the 4th quarter
- Houston – David Husmann 7-yard touchdown run (kick failed), 6:53 remaining in the 4th quarter

== Statistics ==
Statistics	Houston	Tulane
First downs	26	10
Yards rushing	402	102
Yards passing	253	71
Total yards	655	153
Punts-Average	3-43.3	9-39.2
Fumbles-Lost	6-4	2-1
Interceptions Thrown	1	4
Penalties-Yards	5-55	4-26

== Aftermath ==
Beginning in 1996, the Green Wave and Cougars became conference rivals when Conference USA began play in football (the conference began play in basketball and other sports during the 1995–96 school year). Both schools moved to the American Athletic Conference in 2014, with the Cougars eventually moving to the Big 12 Conference in 2023.
