= Clarence Sanders =

American football player (born 1952)

No. 50, 55
- Position: Linebacker

Personal information
- Born: December 28, 1952 (age 73); Montgomery, Alabama, U.S.
- Listed height: 6 ft 4 in (1.93 m)
- Listed weight: 228 lb (103 kg)

Career information
- High school: Montgomery (AL) Carver
- College: Cincinnati
- NFL draft: 1976: 17th round, 463rd overall pick

Career history
- Kansas City Chiefs (1978, 1980)
- Stats at Pro Football Reference

Clarence Sanders (born December 28, 1952) is an American former professional football linebacker. He played for the Kansas City Chiefs in 1978 and 1980.
