= Woody Thompson =

American football player (1952–2024)

No. 48
- Position: Running back

Personal information
- Born: August 20, 1952; Erie, Pennsylvania, U.S.
- Died: August 8, 2024 (aged 71)
- Listed height: 6 ft 1 in (1.85 m)
- Listed weight: 228 lb (103 kg)

Career information
- High school: East (Erie)
- College: Miami (FL)
- NFL draft: 1975: 3rd round, 65th overall pick

Career history
- Atlanta Falcons (1975–1977)

Career NFL statistics
- Rushing attempts: 242
- Rushing yards: 877
- Rushing TDs: 1
- Stats at Pro Football Reference

Alexander Woodrow Thompson (August 20, 1952 – August 8, 2024) was an American professional football player who was a running back for the Atlanta Falcons of the National Football League (NFL) from 1975 to 1977. Thompson died on August 8, 2024, at the age of 71.
