= 1973 NCAA Division I football rankings =

- Season: 1973
- Bowl season: 1973–74 bowl games
- Preseason No. 1: USC
- End of season champions: Notre Dame (AP); Alabama (Coaches)

Two human polls comprised the 1973 National Collegiate Athletic Association (NCAA) Division I football rankings. Unlike most sports, college football's governing body, the NCAA, does not bestow a national championship, instead that title is bestowed by one or more different polling agencies. There are two main weekly polls that begin in the preseason—the AP Poll and the Coaches Poll.

== Legend ==
	Increase in ranking
	Decrease in ranking
	Not ranked previous week
	National champion
(#–#)	Win–loss record
(Italics)	Number of first place votes
т	Tied with team above or below also with this symbol

== AP Poll ==
	Preseason Aug	Week 1 Sep 10	Week 2 Sep 17	Week 3 Sep 24	Week 4 Oct 1	Week 5 Oct 8	Week 6 Oct 15	Week 7 Oct 22	Week 8 Oct 29	Week 9 Nov 5	Week 10 Nov 12	Week 11 Nov 19	Week 12 Nov 26	Week 13 Dec 3	Week 14 (Final) Jan	
1.	USC (55)	USC (0–0) (49)	USC (1–0) (38)	USC (2–0) (36)	Ohio State (2–0) (35)	Ohio State (3–0) (41)	Ohio State (4–0) (39)	Ohio State (5–0) (35)	Ohio State (6–0) (36)	Ohio State (7–0) (35)	Ohio State (8–0) (35)	Ohio State (9–0) (34)	Alabama (10–0) (36)	Alabama (11–0) (34)	Notre Dame (11–0) (33)	1.
2.	Ohio State (2)	Nebraska (1–0) (8)	Nebraska (1–0) (8)	Nebraska (2–0) (12)	Nebraska (3–0) (10)	Nebraska (4–0) (9)	Alabama (5–0) (6)	Alabama (6–0) (12)	Alabama (7–0) (12)	Alabama (8–0) (14)	Alabama (8–0) (13)	Alabama (9–0) (16)	Oklahoma (9–0–1) (20)	Oklahoma (10–0–1) (16)	Ohio State (10–0–1) (11)	2.
3.	Texas (1)	Ohio State (0–0) (2)	Ohio State (1–0) (11)	Ohio State (1–0) (8)	Alabama (3–0) (6)	Alabama (4–0) (6)	Oklahoma (3–0–1) (8)	Oklahoma (4–0–1) (8)	Oklahoma (5–0–1) (9)	Oklahoma (6–0–1) (7)	Oklahoma (7–0–1) (10)	Oklahoma (8–0–1) (9)	Ohio State (9–0–1) (2)	Notre Dame (10–0) (2)	Oklahoma (10–0–1) (16)	3.
4.	Nebraska (2)	Texas (0–0)	Alabama (1–0) (2)	Michigan (2–0) (1)	USC (2–0–1) (3.5)	USC (3–0–1) (1)	Michigan (5–0) (1)	Michigan (6–0) (1)	Michigan (7–0) (1)	Michigan (8–0) (1)	Michigan (9–0) (1)	Michigan (10–0) (1)	Michigan (10–0–1) (1)	Ohio State (9–0–1) (2)	Alabama (11–1)	4.
5.	Michigan (2)	Michigan (0–0) (1)	Michigan (1–0)	Alabama (2–0) (1)	Michigan (3–0) (2)	Michigan (4–0) (1)	Penn State (5–0) (4)	Penn State (6–0) (4)	Notre Dame (6–0)	Notre Dame (7–0) (1)	Notre Dame (8–0) (1)	Notre Dame (8–0) (1)	Notre Dame (9–0) (2)	Michigan (10–0–1) (1)	Penn State (12–0)	5.
6.	Alabama	Alabama (0–0)	Texas (0–0)	Penn State (2–0) (2)	Oklahoma (1–0–1) (1.5)	Oklahoma (2–0–1)	USC (4–0–1)	USC (5–0–1)	Penn State (7–0) (4)	Penn State (8–0) (4)	Penn State (9–0) (1)	Penn State (10–0) (1)	Penn State (11–0) (2)	Penn State (11–0) (3)	Michigan (10–0–1)	6.
7.	Penn State (1)	Penn State (0–0) (1)	Penn State (1–0) (1)	Notre Dame (1–0)	Penn State (3–0) (3)	Penn State (4–0) (3)	Missouri (5–0) (1)	Missouri (6–0) (1)	LSU (7–0)	LSU (8–0)	LSU (8–0)	LSU (9–0)	USC (9–1–1)	USC (9–1–1)	Nebraska (9–2–1)	7.
8.	Notre Dame	Notre Dame (0–0)	Notre Dame (0–0)	Oklahoma (1–0) (1)	Notre Dame (2–0)	Tennessee (4–0)	Notre Dame (4–0)	Notre Dame (5–0)	Arizona State (7–0)	USC (6–1–1)	UCLA (8–1)	UCLA (9–1)	LSU (9–1)	Texas (8–2)	USC (9–2–1)	8.
9.	Tennessee	Tennessee (0–0)	Oklahoma (1–0)	Tennessee (2–0)	Tennessee (3–0)	Notre Dame (3–0)	LSU (5–0)	LSU (6–0)	USC (5–1–1)	UCLA (7–1)	USC (7–1–1)	USC (8–1–1)	Texas (8–2)	UCLA (9–2)	Arizona State (11–1) т	9.
10.	UCLA	Colorado (0–0)	Tennessee (1–0)	LSU (2–0)	LSU (3–0)	LSU (4–0)	Tennessee (5–0)	Nebraska (5–1)	UCLA (6–1)	Missouri (7–1)	Nebraska (7–1–1)	Nebraska (8–1–1)	UCLA (9–2)	Arizona State (10–1)	Houston (11–1) т	10.
11.	Colorado т	Oklahoma (0–0)	LSU (1–0)	Auburn (2–0)	Oklahoma State (3–0)	Arizona State (4–0)	Nebraska (4–1)	Arizona State (6–0)	Tennessee (6–1)	Nebraska (6–1–1)	Texas (6–2)	Texas (7–2)	Arizona State (10–1)	Texas Tech (10–1)	Texas Tech (11–1)	11.
12.	Oklahoma т	Auburn (0–0)	Auburn (1–0)	Oklahoma State (2–0)	Arizona State (3–0)	Missouri (4–0)	Arizona State (5–0)	Houston (6–0)	Missouri (6–1)	Texas Tech (7–1)	Texas Tech (8–1)	Texas Tech (9–1)	Texas Tech (10–1)	Nebraska (8–2–1)	UCLA (9–2)	12.
13.	Auburn	Arizona State (0–0)	Arizona State (1–0)	Arizona State (2–0)	Texas (1–1)	Texas (2–1)	UCLA (4–1)	UCLA (5–1)	Nebraska (5–1–1)	Texas (5–2)	Arizona State (8–1)	Arizona State (9–1)	Nebraska (8–2–1)	LSU (9–2)	LSU (9–3)	13.
14.	Arizona State	Florida (0–0)	NC State (2–0)	Texas (0–1)	Houston (3–0)	Houston (4–0)	Houston (5–0)	Tennessee (5–1)	Tulane (6–0)	Arizona State (7–1)	Missouri (7–2)	Houston (8–1)	Houston (9–1)	Houston (10–1)	Texas (8–3)	14.
15.	Florida	LSU (0–0)	Florida (1–0)	Houston (2–0)	Missouri (3–0)	UCLA (3–1)	Miami (FL) (3–1)	Tulane (5–0)	Texas Tech (6–1)	Houston (7–1)	Houston (8–1)	Miami (OH) (10–0)	Miami (OH) (10–0)	Miami (OH) (10–0)	Miami (OH) (11–0)	15.
16.	LSU	UCLA (0–1)	Houston (1–0)	Florida (2–0)	UCLA (2–1)	Miami (FL) (2–1)	Colorado (4–1)	Miami (OH) (6–0)	Miami (OH) (7–0)	Tennessee (6–2)	Tennessee (6–2)	NC State (7–3)	NC State (8–3)	NC State (8–3)	NC State (9–3)	16.
17.	NC State	NC State (2–0)	Oklahoma State (1–0)	UCLA (1–1)	Miami (FL) (2–0)	Colorado (3–1)	Tulane (4–0)	Kansas (4–2)	Colorado (5–2)	Miami (OH) (8–0)	Miami (OH) (9–0)	Tulane (8–1)	Kansas (7–3–1)	Tulane (9–2)	Missouri (8–4)	17.
18.	Houston	Houston (0–0)	UCLA (0–1)	Miami (FL) (1–0)	Colorado (2–1)	Tulane (3–0)	Kansas (4–1)	Texas Tech (5–1)	Houston (6–1)	Kansas (5–2–1)	Kansas (6–2–1)	Oklahoma State (5–2–2)	Maryland (8–3)	Maryland (8–3)	Kansas (7–4–1)	18.
19.	North Carolina	North Carolina (0–0)	Colorado (0–1)	NC State (2–1)	SMU (3–0)	Kansas (3–1)	Arizona (5–0)	Texas (3–2)	Auburn (5–2) т	Kent State (7–1)	Arizona (8–1)	Missouri (7–3)	Tennessee (7–3)	Kansas (7–3–1)	Tennessee (8–4)	19.
20.	Texas Tech	Texas Tech (0–0)	Bowling Green (1–0) т; Missouri (1–0) т	Missouri (2–0)	West Virginia (3–0)	Miami (OH) (4–0)	Miami (OH) (5–0)	Richmond (6–0)	Texas (4–2) т	Pittsburgh (5–2–1)	NC State (6–3)	Kansas (6–3–1) т; Pittsburgh (6–3–1) т	Missouri (7–4)	Tennessee (8–3)	Maryland (8–4) т; Tulane (9–3) т	20.
	Preseason Aug	Week 1 Sep 10	Week 2 Sep 17	Week 3 Sep 24	Week 4 Oct 1	Week 5 Oct 8	Week 6 Oct 15	Week 7 Oct 22	Week 8 Oct 29	Week 9 Nov 5	Week 10 Nov 12	Week 11 Nov 19	Week 12 Nov 26	Week 13 Dec 3	Week 14 (Final) Jan	
		None	Dropped: North Carolina; Texas Tech	Dropped: Bowling Green; Colorado	Dropped: Auburn; Florida; NC State	Dropped: Oklahoma State; SMU; West Virginia	Dropped: Texas	Dropped: Arizona; Colorado; Miami (FL)	Dropped: Kansas; Richmond	Dropped: Auburn; Colorado; Tulane	Dropped: Kent State; Pittsburgh	Dropped: Arizona; Tennessee	Dropped: Oklahoma State; Pittsburgh; Tulane	Dropped: Missouri	None	

== Final Coaches Poll ==
This was the last season in which the final UPI Coaches Poll was released prior to the bowl games, in early December.
Alabama received 21 of the 34 first-place votes; Oklahoma received nine, Ohio State two, Notre Dame one, and Michigan one.

Ranking	Team	Conference	Bowl
1	Alabama	SEC	Lost Sugar, 23–24
2	Oklahoma	Big Eight	none
3	Ohio State	Big Ten	Won Rose, 42–21
4	Notre Dame	Independent	Won Sugar, 24–23
5	Penn State	Independent	Won Orange, 16–9
6	Michigan	Big Ten	none
7	USC	Pac-8	Lost Rose, 21–42
8	Texas	Southwest	Lost Cotton, 3–19
9	UCLA	Pac-8	none
10	Arizona State	WAC	Won Fiesta, 28–7
11	Nebraska	Big Eight	Won Cotton, 19–3
11	Texas Tech	Southwest	Won Gator, 28–19
13	Houston	Independent	Won Bluebonnet, 47–7
14	LSU	SEC	Lost Orange, 9–16
15	Kansas	Big Eight	Lost Liberty, 18–31
15	Tulane	Independent	Lost Bluebonnet, 7–47
17	Miami (OH)	Mid-American	Won Tangerine, 16–7
18	Maryland	ACC	Lost Peach, 16–17
19	San Diego State	PCAA	none
19	Florida	SEC	Lost Tangerine, 7–16

- Prior to the 1975 season, the Big Ten and Pac-8 conferences allowed only one postseason participant each, for the Rose Bowl.
