= List of Coast Guard Bears head football coaches =

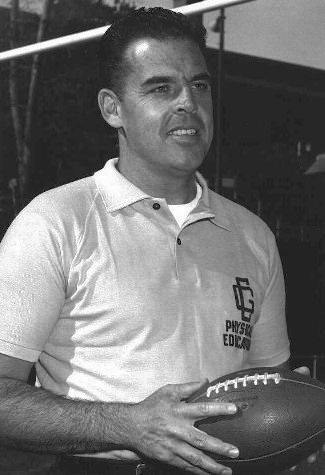
Coach Otto Graham was inducted into both the college and professional Football halls of fame.

The Coast Guard Bears football program is a college football team that represents United States Coast Guard Academy in the New England Football Conference, a part of the NCAA Division III. The team has had 15 head coaches since its first recorded football game in 1922, including hall of fame member Otto Graham The current coach is C. C. Grant who first took the position for the 2020 season.

== Key ==
Key to symbols in coaches list
General		Overall		Conference		Postseason (Note: Although the first Rose Bowl Game was played in 1902, it has been continuously played since the 1916 game, and is recognized as the oldest bowl game by the NCAA. "—" indicates any season prior to 1916 when postseason games were not played.)	
No.	Order of coaches (Note: A running total of the number of head coaches, with coaches who served separate tenures being counted only once. Interim head coaches are represented with "Int" and are not counted in the running total. "—" indicates the team played but either without a coach or no coach is on record. "X" indicates an interim year without play.)	GC	Games coached	CW	Conference wins	PW	Postseason wins
DC	Division championships	OW	Overall wins	CL	Conference losses	PL	Postseason losses
CC	Conference championships	OL	Overall losses	CT	Conference ties	PT	Postseason ties
NC	National championships	OT	Overall ties (Note: Overtime rules in college football were introduced in 1996, making ties impossible in the period since.)	C%	Conference winning percentage		
†	Elected to the College Football Hall of Fame	O%	Overall winning percentage (Note: When computing the win–loss percentage, a tie counts as half a win and half a loss.)				

== Coaches ==
Statistics correct as of the end of the 2025 college football season.

No.	Name	Term	GC	OW	OL	OT	O%	CW	CL	CT	C%	PW	PL	CCs	NCs	Awards
1	Raymond V. Marron	1922–1923	6	0	6	0	.000	—	—	—		—	—	—	—	
2	Walter R. Richards	1926–1928	19	6	11	2	.368	—	—	—		—	—	—	—	
3	Johnny Merriman	1929–1945	128	46	72	10	.398	—	—	—		—	—	—	—	
4	Nelson Nitchman	1946–1958	93	45	43	5	.511	—	—	—		—	—	—	—	
5	Frank Kapral	1966–1967	16	0	16	0	.000	—	—	—		—	—	—	—	
6	Tad Schroeder	1968–1973	60	29	31	0	.483	—	—	—		—	—	—	—	
7	Otto Graham^{†}	1959–1965; 1974–1975	77	44	32	1	.578	—	—	—		—	1	—	—	
8	Bill Hickey	1976–1979	38	11	26	1	.303	—	—	—		—	—	—	—	
9	Larry Rutledge	1980–1982	28	7	21	0	.250	—	—	—		—	—	—	—	
10	Bob Campiglia	1983–985	30	11	19	0	.367	—	—	—		—	—	—	—	
11	Thomas H. Bell	1986–1992	64	36	28	0	.563	—	—	—		1	-	—	—	
12	Bill Schmitz	1993–1996	39	20	19	0	.513	—	—	—		—	—	1	—	
13	Chuck Mills	1997	11	9	2	0	.818	—	—	—		—	—	1	—	
14	Bob Estock	1998	9	1	8	0	.111	—	—	—		—	—	—	—	
15	Bill George	1999–2019	201	75	126	0	.373	—	—	—		—	—	2	—	
16	C. C. Grant	2020–present	51	22	29	0	.431	—	—	—		—	—	0	—	
