= List of State University of New York at Cortland alumni =

The State University of New York at Cortland is a public university in Cortland, New York. The university was known as Cortland Normal School from 1868 to 1941, and Cortland State Teachers College from 1941 to 1961. It is also called SUNY Cortland. Following are some of its notable alumni.

== Academics ==
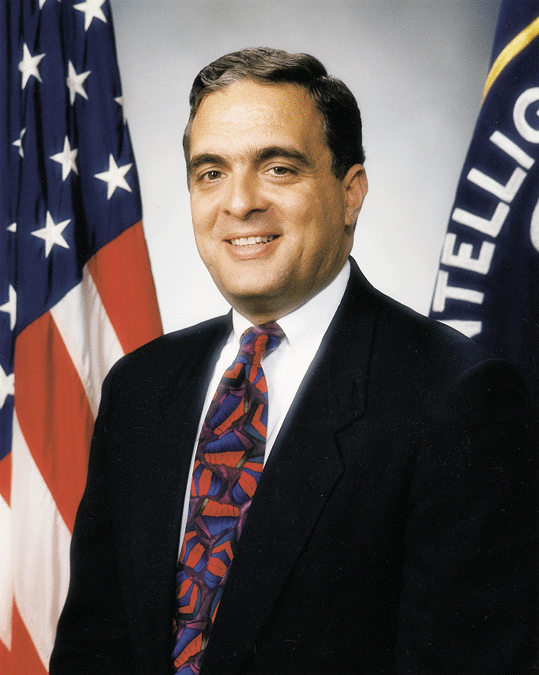
George Tenet

- John P. Allegrante, Charles Irwin Lambert Professor of Health Behavior and Education at Teachers College, Columbia University
- Mark R. Ginsberg, fifteenth president of Towson University
- Scott A. Gordon, ninth president of Stephen F. Austin State University
- Suad Joseph, professor of Anthropology and Women and Gender Studies at the University of California, and general editor of the Encyclopedia of Women and Islamic Cultures
- Timothy Shanahan, philosopher and professor of Philosophy at Loyola Marymount University
- Jake Steinfeld, actor, entrepreneur (Body by Jake), and television personality (did not graduate)
- George Tenet, former director of Central Intelligence for the Central Intelligence Agency, and Distinguished Professor in the Practice of Diplomacy at Georgetown University
- Robert Thompson, professor of communications at Syracuse University

== Art and architecture ==
- George W. Conable, architect

== Entertainment ==
- Danny Bruno, actor
- Dominic Carter, news reporter and political commentator for Verizon Fios/RNN News
- Ted Demme, film director and producer
- Kevin James, comedian, television and film actor
- Zane Lamprey, television host, actor, and writer
- Toby Orenstein, founder and director of the Columbia Center for Theatrical Arts, the Young Columbians, and Toby's Dinner Theatre (did not graduate)
- Erin Ryder, producer and director in television and digital media who produced and directed docuseries and live events for NBC, ESPN, National Geographic, Amazon Studios, Nickelodeon
- Scott Williams, television writer and producer

== Literature and journalism ==
- Annie Fox, author
- Catherine Samali Kavuma, novelist, World Bank executive
- Fern Kupfer, author and professor
- Kevin Madden, pundit and public relations professional in newspapers, magazines, and television
- John Stigall, poet

== Medicine and science ==
- Everette Joseph, atmospheric scientist who serves as the director of the National Center for Atmospheric Research
- Eugene H. Porter, physician and commissioner of the New York State Health Department and the Foods and Markets Division
- Jerilyn Ross, psychotherapist, phobia expert, mental health activist, and co-founded the Anxiety and Depression Association of America
- William H. Thomas, physician, author, and performer

== Military ==
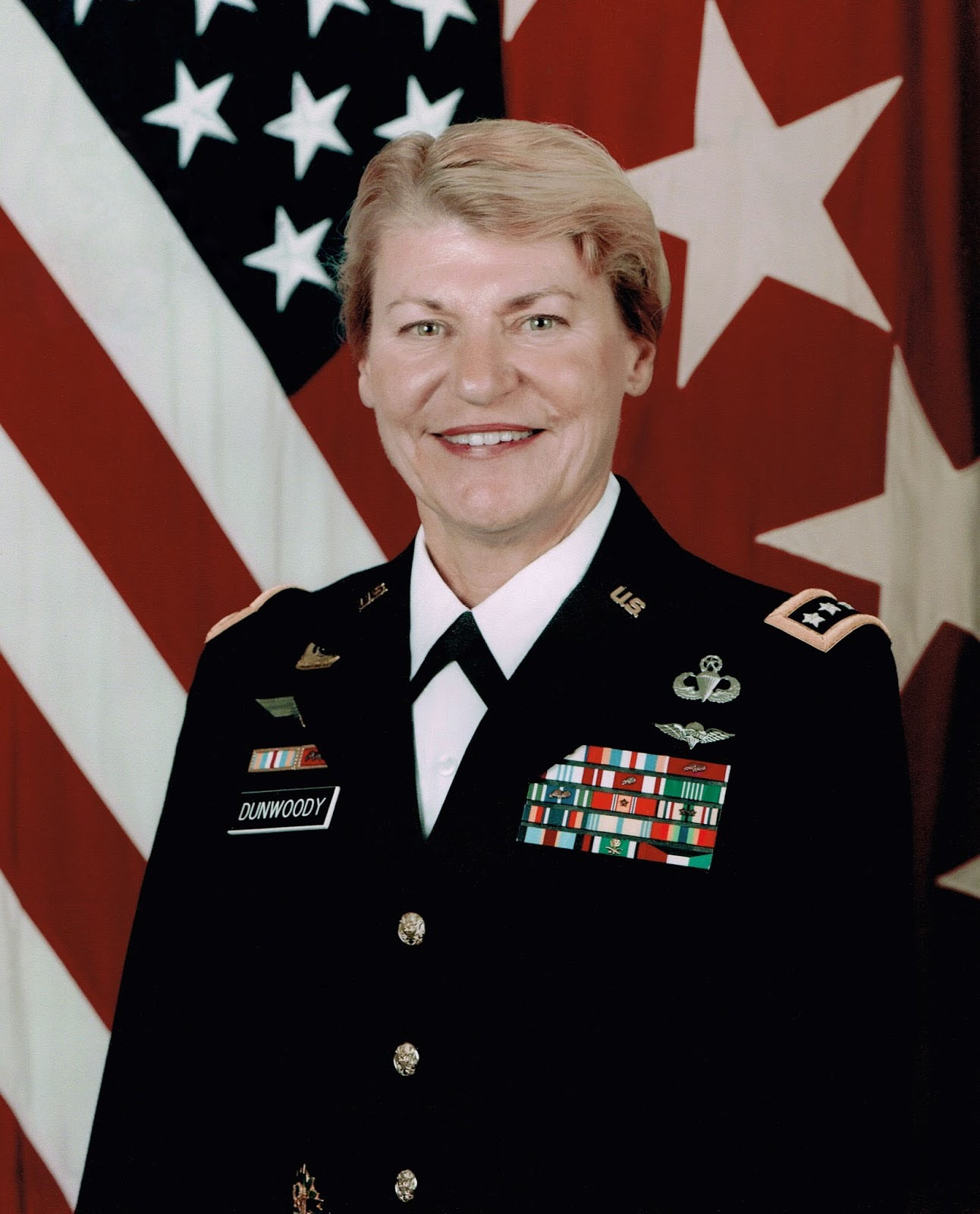
Ann E. Dunwoody

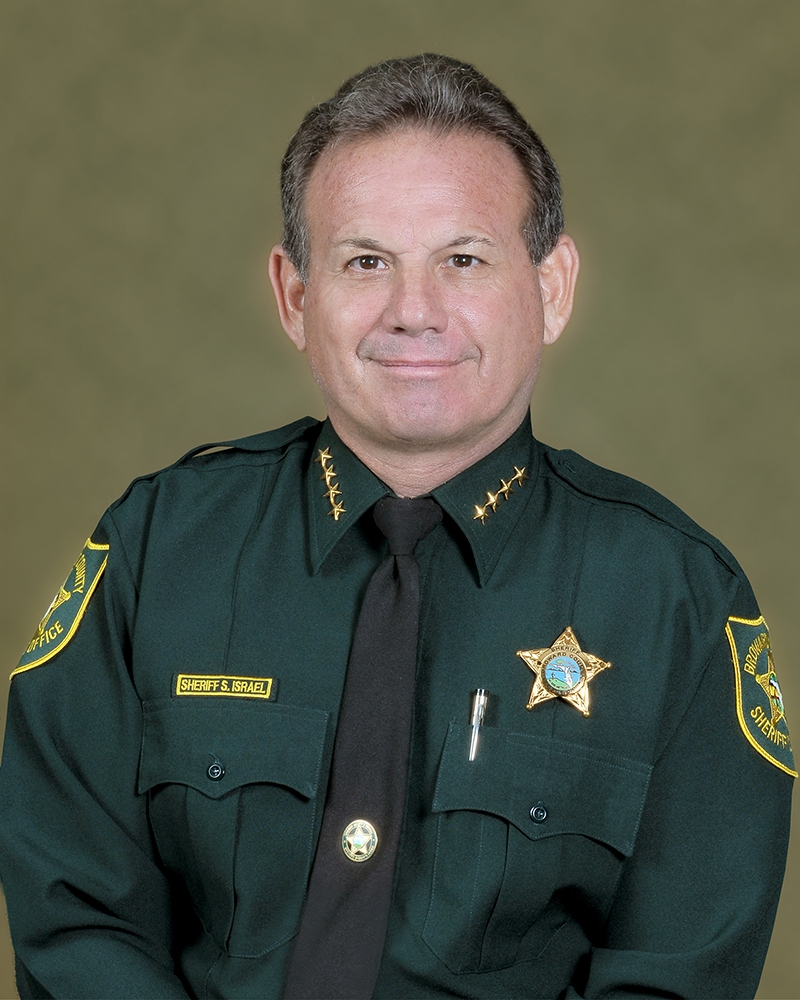
Scott Israel

- David L. Brainard, U.S. Army brigadier general
- William Church Davis, major general in the U.S. Army
- Ann E. Dunwoody, first female four-star officer in the history of the U.S. Army and 2011 NCAA Theodore Roosevelt Award winner

== Politics ==
- Joseph H. Brownell, member of the New York State Assembly
- Scott Israel (BA, '77), former sheriff of Broward County, Florida, current police chief of Opa-Locka, Florida
- Michael N. Kane, New York State Assembly
- Catherine Samali Kavuma, novelist, World Bank executive, and former Ugandan ambassador to the US
- Clayton Lusk, acting lieutenant governor of New York in 1922
- Nathan L. Miller, 43rd governor of New York
- Duane F Cheney, member of the Indiana House

== Sports ==
- Paul Alexander, professional football coach
- Bob Bateson, football player
- George Breen, Olympic swimmer/medalist
- C. B. Bucknor, current Major League Baseball umpire
- Chadd Cassidy, professional ice hockey coach
- Jake Ceresna, gridiron football player and coach
- Cathy Compton, college softball coach
- Tommy Condell, professional football coach
- Ed Decker, college football coach
- Mick Foley, former professional wrestler and author
- John Franchi (B.A. in Liberal Arts), professional mixed martial artist for the WEC's featherweight division
- Marion Fricano, professional baseball player
- Brian Giorgis, Marist College women's basketball head coach
- C. C. Grant, college football and baseball coach
- Jim Henderson, radio voice announcer of the New Orleans Saints
- Sid Jamieson, head lacrosse coach at Bucknell University
- Fred Ketchum, professional baseball player
- Derek Lalonde, professional ice hockey coach
- Nate Leaman, college ice hockey coach
- Walt Lynch, professional baseball player
- Scott Manning, former professional soccer player, 1980 Olympian
- Ryan McCarthy, college football coach
- Tamdan McCrory (B.S. in kinesiology), professional mixed martial artist for the UFC's Middleweight Division
- John Moiseichik, basketball player
- Tim Pendergast, college football coach
- Dan Pepicelli, college baseball coach
- Craig Peterson, professional football coach
- Dan Pitcher, professional football coach
- Evan Rothstein, professional football coach
- Greg Sankey, commissioner of the Southeastern Conference
- Matt Senk, college baseball coach at Stony Brook
- Aljamain Sterling (B.A. in Physical Education), two-time NCAA D-III All-American wrestler; professional mixed martial artist for the UFC
- Hershey Strosberg, college soccer coach
- Bill Tierney, NCAA lacrosse player and coach
- R-Kal Truluck, professional football player
- Michael J. Waldvogel, National Lacrosse Hall of Fame member
- Bob Weinhauer, basketball coach and executive
- Lee Williams, college basketball coach and executive

== Other ==
- Shontay Lundy, entrepreneur and activist
