= Commander-in-Chief's Trophy =

Football trophy for U.S. service academies

- Showing the side of the trophy. Current holder is Air Force.

- Air Force Falcons Army Black Knights Navy Midshipmen
- Sport: American football
- First meeting: 1972; 54 years ago
- Latest meeting: Air Force Falcons

Statistics
- Most wins: Air Force (22)

Locations of Air Force, Army, and Navy

The Commander-in-Chief's Trophy (CIC Trophy) is awarded to each season's winner of the American college football series among the teams of the U.S. Military Academy (Army Black Knights), the U.S. Naval Academy (Navy Midshipmen), and the U.S. Air Force Academy (Air Force Falcons).

The Navy–Air Force game is normally played on the first Saturday in October, the Army–Air Force game on the first Saturday in November, and the Army–Navy Game on the second Saturday in December. In the event of a tie, the award is shared, but the previous winner retains physical possession of the trophy. The Commander-in-Chief's Trophy and the Michigan MAC Trophy are the only NCAA Division I FBS triangular rivalry trophies awarded annually. The few others, such as the Florida Cup and the Beehive Boot, are contested sporadically.

Through 2026, the Air Force Falcons hold the most trophy victories with 22. The Navy Midshipmen have won 18. The Army Black Knights trail with 10. The trophy has been shared on five occasions, most recently in 2021.

== History of the trophy ==
Air Force first played Army in 1959 and Navy in 1960. Prior to 1972, Air Force met Army in odd years and Navy in even years (and neither in 1961, 1962, 1964). 1972 was the first year the trophy was awarded, and Air Force has played both Army and Navy every year since. Because Air Force played Army and not Navy in 1971, the Army-Air Force game is the longest uninterrupted intersectional rivalry in college football by one game over the Air Force-Navy game.

The Commander-in-Chief's Trophy was the brainchild of Air Force General George B. Simler, a former Air Force Academy athletic director who envisioned the trophy as a means to create an annual series of football games for the Air Force Academy against the Military Academy and the Naval Academy. First awarded in 1972 by President Richard Nixon, the trophy itself is jointly sponsored by the alumni associations of the three academies.

The trophy is named for the U.S. President, who is the Commander-in-Chief of all U.S. military services under the U.S. Constitution. The President has personally awarded the trophy on a number of occasions. During the 1980s, for instance, President Ronald Reagan presented the award in an annual White House ceremony. In 1996, President Bill Clinton presented the trophy to the Army team at Veterans Stadium after the Army–Navy Game. From 2003 to 2008, then-president George W. Bush presented the trophy to Navy teams at ceremonies in the White House. The White House presentation continued under the presidencies of Barack Obama, Donald Trump, and Joe Biden.

During the late 1980s and early 1990s, the winner of the trophy, if bowl eligible, was granted an invitation to the Liberty Bowl in Memphis, Tennessee.

In the annual series, Air Force plays a home game and a road game, usually (but not always) both on campus, hosting Navy in even-numbered years and Army in odd-numbered years. Army–Navy is a neutral site game, usually in a major eastern metropolitan area and most frequently in Philadelphia. Home games for Army–Navy are usually the result of circumstance, such as the 1942 and 1943 editions being moved to Annapolis and West Point due to World War II and 2020 at Army's campus because of the COVID-19 pandemic.

The other two federal service academies – the U.S. Coast Guard Academy and U.S. Merchant Marine Academy – do not participate in this competition. They are approximately one-quarter the size of the three major service academies and compete in Division III athletics, so they do not compete against the larger military academies in most sports. The Coast Guard Bears and Merchant Marine Mariners have an annual football rivalry for the Secretaries' Cup.

The trophy has been the subject of at least one "spirit mission," or prank, leading up to a service academy rivalry game. In late November 2019, a group of Naval Academy midshipmen stole the CIC trophy from West Point (who had won it the previous year) and transported it to Annapolis. The prank was revealed when the trophy was placed on display at noon meal in front of the Brigade of Midshipmen at USNA. The event received significant attention on social media platforms. Upon West Point leadership learning of the incident, the trophy was promptly returned to USMA. It is not known how the trophy was stolen and transported, and neither Academy provided an official comment on the incident. Navy went on to win the CIC trophy following a 31–7 victory against Army on December 14, 2019.

== The trophy ==
The trophy itself stands 2.5 feet (0.76 m) high and weighs 170 lb (77 kg). The design consists of three silver footballs in a pyramid-like arrangement, set on a circular base, with three arc-shaped sections cut out – one for each academy. In each of the cut-out areas stands a silver figurine of the mascot of one of the academies, in front of small, engraved plates denoting which years the respective academy has won the trophy. Beneath each of the three silver footballs is the crest of one of the three academies.

When Air Force has possession of the trophy, it is displayed in a glass case in the Cadet Fieldhouse, the indoor sports complex at the Air Force Academy. When Navy has possession of the trophy, it is displayed in a glass case in Bancroft Hall, the Midshipmen's dormitory. When Army possesses the trophy, it is housed in a glass case outside the football offices in the Army Sports Hall of Fame, part of the Kimsey Athletic Center in Michie Stadium.

The trophy was replaced after the 2020 season with an identical trophy. The 1972–2020 trophy is now housed at the College Football Hall of Fame in Atlanta, GA.

== Game results and trophy winners ==
In the event of a shared award, the previous year's winner retains custody of the trophy.

Air Force victories	Army victories	Navy victories	Shared trophies and tied games	No game played, no trophy awarded and future events

Season	Trophy Winner	Air Force – Navy score	Air Force – Army score	Army – Navy score
Before Trophy Established
1890– 1958	N/A	Not played	Not played	See Army–Navy Game; Army led 30–24–5
1959	N/A	Not played	Tie 13–13 (Note: At Yankee Stadium)	Navy 43–12 (Note: At Philadelphia Municipal Stadium / John F. Kennedy Stadium)
1960	N/A	Navy 35–3 (Note: At Baltimore Memorial Stadium)	Not played	Navy 17–12
1961	N/A	Not played	Not played	Navy 13–7
1962	N/A	Not played	Not played	Navy 34–14
1963	N/A	Not played	Army 14–10 (Note: At Soldier Field)	Navy 21–15
1964	N/A	Not played	Not played	Army 11–8
1965	N/A	Not played	Air Force 14–3	Tie 7–7
1966	N/A	Air Force 15–7 (Note: At Falcon Stadium)	Not played	Army 20–7
1967	N/A	Not played	Army 10–7	Navy 19–14
1968	N/A	Air Force 26–20	Not played	Army 21–14
1969	N/A	Not played	Air Force 13–6 (Note: At Michie Stadium)	Army 27–0
1970	N/A	Air Force 26–3 (Note: At Robert F. Kennedy Memorial Stadium)	Not played	Navy 11–7
1971	N/A	Not played	Air Force 20–7	Army 24–23
Trophy Established
1972	Army (1)	Navy 21–17	Army 17–14	Army 23–15
1973	Navy (1)	Navy 42–6 (Note: At Navy-Marine Corps Memorial Stadium)	Air Force 43–10	Navy 51–0
1974	Shared (Navy retained trophy) (1)	Air Force 19–16	Army 17–16	Navy 19–0
1975	Navy (2)	Navy 17–0	Air Force 33–3	Navy 30–6
1976	Shared (Navy retained trophy) (2)	Air Force 13–3	Army 24–7	Navy 38–10
1977	Army (2)	Navy 10–7	Army 31–6	Army 17–14
1978	Navy (3)	Navy 37–8	Army 28–14	Navy 28–0
1979	Navy (4)	Navy 13–9	Air Force 28–7	Navy 31–7
1980	Shared (Navy retained trophy) (3)	Air Force 21–20	Army 47–24	Navy 33–6 (Note: At Veterans Stadium)
1981	Navy (5)	Navy 30–13	Air Force 7–3	Tie 3–3
1982	Air Force (1)	Air Force 24–21	Air Force 27–9	Navy 24–7
1983	Air Force (2)	Air Force 44–17	Air Force 41–20	Navy 42–13 (Note: At Rose Bowl)
1984	Army (3)	Air Force 29–22	Army 24–12	Army 28–11
1985	Air Force (3)	Air Force 24–7	Air Force 45–7	Navy 17–7
1986	Army (4)	Air Force 40–6	Army 21–11	Army 27–7
1987	Air Force (4)	Air Force 23–13	Air Force 27–10	Army 17–3
1988	Army (5)	Air Force 34–24	Army 28–15	Army 20–15
1989	Air Force (5)	Air Force 35–7	Air Force 29–3	Navy 19–17 (Note: At Giants Stadium)
1990	Air Force (6)	Air Force 24–7	Air Force 15–3	Army 30–20
1991	Air Force (7)	Air Force 46–6	Air Force 25–0	Navy 24–3
1992	Air Force (8)	Air Force 18–16	Air Force 7–3	Army 25–24
1993	Shared (Air Force retained trophy) (4)	Navy 28–24	Air Force 25–6	Army 16–14
1994	Air Force (9)	Air Force 43–21	Air Force 10–6	Army 22–20
1995	Air Force (10)	Air Force 30–20	Air Force 38–20	Army 14–13
1996	Army (6)	Navy 20–17	Army 23–7	Army 28–24
1997	Air Force (11)	Air Force 10–7	Air Force 24–0	Navy 39–7
1998	Air Force (12)	Air Force 49–7	Air Force 35–7	Army 34–30
1999	Air Force (13)	Air Force 19–14 (Note: At Northwest Stadium)	Air Force 28–0	Navy 19–9
2000	Air Force (14)	Air Force 27–13	Air Force 41–27	Navy 30–28 (Note: At M&T Bank Stadium)
2001	Air Force (15)	Air Force 24–18	Air Force 34–24	Army 26–17
2002	Air Force (16)	Air Force 48–7	Air Force 49–30	Navy 58–12
2003	Navy (6)	Navy 28–25	Air Force 31–3	Navy 34–6 (Note: At Lincoln Financial Field)
2004	Navy (7)	Navy 24–21	Air Force 31–22	Navy 42–13
2005	Navy (8)	Navy 27–24	Army 27–24	Navy 42–23
2006	Navy (9)	Navy 24–17	Air Force 43–7	Navy 26–14
2007	Navy (10)	Navy 31–20	Air Force 30–10	Navy 38–3
2008	Navy (11)	Navy 33–27	Air Force 16–7	Navy 34–0
2009	Navy (12)	Navy 16–13 (OT)	Air Force 35–7	Navy 17–3
2010	Air Force (17)	Air Force 14–6	Air Force 42–22	Navy 31–17
2011	Air Force (18)	Air Force 35–34 (OT)	Air Force 24–14	Navy 27–21
2012	Navy (13)	Navy 28–21 (OT)	Army 41–21	Navy 17–13
2013	Navy (14)	Navy 28–10	Air Force 42–28	Navy 34–7
2014	Air Force (19)	Air Force 30–21	Air Force 23–6	Navy 17–10
2015	Navy (15)	Navy 33–11	Air Force 20–3	Navy 21–17
2016	Air Force (20)	Air Force 28–14	Air Force 31–12	Army 21–17
2017	Army (7)	Navy 48–45	Army 21–0	Army 14–13
2018	Army (8)	Air Force 35–7	Army 17–14	Army 17–10
2019	Navy (16)	Navy 34–25	Air Force 17–13	Navy 31–7
2020	Army (9)	Air Force 40–7	Army 10–7	Army 15–0
2021	Shared (Army retained trophy) (5)	Air Force 23–3	Army 21–14 (OT) (Note: At Globe Life Field)	Navy 17–13 (Note: At MetLife Stadium)
2022	Air Force (21)	Air Force 13–10	Air Force 13–7	Army 20–17 (2OT)
2023	Army (10)	Air Force 17–6	Army 23–3 (Note: At Empower Field at Mile High)	Army 17–11 (Note: At Gillette Stadium)
2024	Navy (17)	Navy 34–7	Army 20–3	Navy 31–13
2025	Navy (18)	Navy 34–31	Army 20–17	Navy 17–16
2026	Air Force (22)	Air Force 14–9	Air Force 24–21	December 12
Season	Trophy winner	Air Force – Navy score	Air Force – Army score	Army – Navy score
Records since 1972		Air Force: 32–23 (.582)	Air Force: 36–19 (.655)	Navy: 33–20–1 (.620)
All-time Records		Air Force: 35–24 (.593)	Air Force: 39–21–1 (.648)	Navy: 64–55–7 (.536)

Records since Trophy established (1972)
Team	Trophies	Last	W	L	T	Pct.
Air Force	22	2026	68	42	0	.618
Navy	18	2025	56	52	1	.518
Army	10	2023	39	69	1	.362

- Five shared trophies, last in 2021
- Only tie was in 1981 (Army–Navy, 3–3)
- Overtime for Division I-A regular season introduced in 1996
  - Five OT games, three between Navy (2–1) and Air Force, one between Army (1–0) and Air Force, and one between Army (1–0) and Navy.

== See also ==
- Army–Navy Game
- Air Force–Army men's ice hockey rivalry
- Commander's Classic
- Secretaries Cup – annual Division III rivalry game between the Coast Guard Bears and Merchant Marine Mariners
