= Campiglia =

Campiglia may refer to:

== Places in Italy ==
- Campiglia Cervo
- Campiglia dei Berici
- Campiglia Marittima

== People ==
- Bob Campiglia, American football coach
- Giovanni Domenico Campiglia, Italian painter
