= Chuck Mills =

American college football coach (1928–2021)

Biographical details
- Born: December 1, 1928; Chicago, Illinois, U.S.
- Died: January 18, 2021 (aged 92); Honolulu, Hawaii, U.S.
- Education: Illinois State University

Coaching career (HC unless noted)
- 1951: Chicago Mount Carmel HS (IL) (assistant)
- 1952–1953: Mendel Catholic HS (IL)
- 1954: North Chicago HS (IL)
- 1955: Loyola HS (CA)
- 1956: Citrus (line)
- 1957–1958: Pomona (assistant)
- 1959–1961: Pomona
- 1962–1963: Indiana State (PA)
- 1964: Merchant Marine
- 1965: Arizona (assistant)
- 1966: Kansas City Chiefs (assistant)
- 1967–1972: Utah State
- 1973–1977: Wake Forest
- 1980–1988: Southern Oregon
- 1997: Coast Guard

Administrative career (AD unless noted)
- 1978–1980: Blue–Gray Football Classic (exec. dir.)
- 1980–1989: Southern Oregon
- 1989–1999: Coast Guard

Head coaching record
- Overall: 132–133–5 (college)
- Tournaments: 1–1 (NAIA D-I playoffs); 0–1 (NCAA D-III playoffs)

Accomplishments and honors

Championships
- 1 FFC (1997)

Morton J. "Chuck" Mills (December 1, 1928 – January 18, 2021) was an American college football coach. He served as the head coach at Pomona College (1957–1961), Indiana University of Pennsylvania (1962–1963), the United States Merchant Marine Academy (1964), Utah State University (1967–1972), Wake Forest University (1973–1977), Southern Oregon University (1980–1988), and the United States Coast Guard Academy (1997).

== Education ==
A native of Chicago, Illinois, Mills graduated from Illinois State University in 1950.

== Coaching career ==
Hired in February 1967 at Utah State University, Mills was previously the offensive coordinator with the Kansas City Chiefs, the champions of the American Football League (AFL). Previous USU head coach Tony Knap had resigned in January for an assistant coaching position with the BC Lions in the Canadian Football League (CFL).

During his six seasons at Utah State, Mills' Aggies went 38–23–1 (.621); 8–3 marks in 1971 and 1972 were the best. He took the first American collegiate football team to Japan in December 1971; the Japanese equivalent of the Heisman Trophy, known as the "Mills Trophy," is presented to the top collegiate football player in Japan each year.

== Death ==
In mid-January 2021, Mills was hospitalized in a Honolulu hospital for pneumonia and organ failure. He died on the morning of January 18, 2021, at age 92.

== Head coaching record ==
=== College ===
Year	Team	Overall	Conference	Standing	Bowl/playoffs	Coaches^{#}
Pomona Sagehens (Southern California Intercollegiate Athletic Conference) (1959–1961)
1959	Pomona	5–4	3–2	3rd		
1960	Pomona	2–7	1–4	5th		
1961	Pomona	5–4	1–3	4th		
Pomona:		12–15	5–0			
Indiana State Indians (Pennsylvania State Athletic Conference) (1962–1963)
1962	Indiana State	5–2–1	4–1–1	T–2nd (West)		
1963	Indiana State	7–1–1	5–1	2nd (West)		
Indiana State:		12–3–2	9–2–1			
Merchant Marine Mariners (NCAA College Division independent) (1964)
1964	Merchant Marine	3–7				
Merchant Marine:		3–7				
Utah State Aggies (NCAA University Division independent) (1967–1972)
1967	Utah State	7–2–1				
1968	Utah State	3–7				
1969	Utah State	7–3				
1970	Utah State	5–5				
1971	Utah State	8–3				
1972	Utah State	8–3				T–17
Utah State:		38–23–1				
Wake Forest Demon Deacons (Atlantic Coast Conference) (1973–1977)
1973	Wake Forest	1–9–1	0–5–1	7th		
1974	Wake Forest	1–10	0–6	7th		
1975	Wake Forest	3–8	3–3	T–3rd		
1976	Wake Forest	5–6	3–3	3rd		
1977	Wake Forest	1–10	0–6	7th		
Wake Forest:		11–43–1	6–23–1			
Southern Oregon Raiders (Evergreen Conference) (1980–1984)
1980	Southern Oregon	2–7	2–3	4th		
1981	Southern Oregon	6–4	NA	NA		
1982	Southern Oregon	6–4	3–1	3rd		
1983	Southern Oregon	9–2	5–2	T–2nd		
1984	Southern Oregon	6–4	4–3	4th		
Southern Oregon Raiders (Columbia Football League) (1985–1987)
1985	Southern Oregon	2–6–1	1–4–1	6th (Southern)		
1986	Southern Oregon	4–5	2–4	T–4th (Southern)		
1987	Southern Oregon	7–4	4–2	T–2nd (Southern)	L NAIA Division I Quarterfinal	
Southern Oregon Raiders (Columbia Football Association) (1988)
1988	Southern Oregon	5–4	3–3	T–3rd (Mount Hood)		
Southern Oregon:		47–40–1	24–22–1			
Coast Guard Bears (Freedom Football Conference) (1997)
1997	Coast Guard	9–2	6–0	1st	L NCAA Division III First Round	
Coast Guard:		9–2	6–0			
Total:		132–133–5				
National championship Conference title Conference division title or championship game berth
