= Walter R. Richards =

American football coach, United States Coast Guard (1904–1991)

Biographical details
- Born: January 10, 1904
- Died: October 12, 1991 (aged 87); North Fort Myers, Florida, U.S.

Playing career

Football
- 1922–1923: Coast Guard

Baseball
- 1923: Coast Guard

Coaching career (HC unless noted)

Football
- 1926–1928: Coast Guard

Head coaching record
- Overall: 6–11–2

Walter R. Richards (January 10, 1904 – October 12, 1991) was an American football coach and a captain in the United States Coast Guard. He was the head football coach at United States Coast Guard Academy in New London, Connecticut for three seasons, from 1926 to 1928.

Richards was born on January 10, 1904, to Bart and Ellen Strandberg Richard. He attended high school in Bremerton, Washington. Richards entered the United States Coast Guard Academy in 1922. He lettered in football twice, in 1922 and 1923, and in baseball, in 1923.

Richards was married to Esther Roberta Cooper (June 6, 1906 – April 30, 1982), whom he wed on November 14, 1925, at New London. He died on October 12, 1991, in North Fort Myers, Florida

== Head coaching record ==
Year	Team	Overall	Conference	Standing	Bowl/playoffs
Coast Guard Bears (Independent) (1926–1928)
1926	Coast Guard	2–2			
1927	Coast Guard	1–6			
1928	Coast Guard	3–3–2			
Coast Guard:		6–11–2			
Total:		6–11–2			
