= Anxiety and Depression Association of America =

American NGO

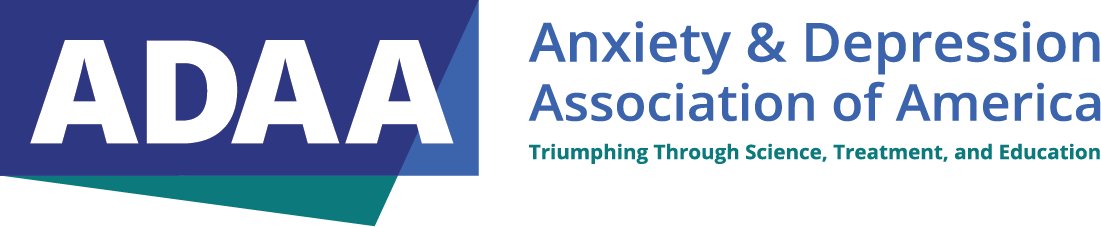
- Founded: December 1, 1980; 45 years ago
- Tax ID no.: 52-1248820
- Legal status: 501(c)(3) nonprofit organization
- Headquarters: Silver Spring, Maryland
- Coordinates: 38.997995°N 77.029586°W
- Members: 1,500
- President: Charles B. Nemeroff, MD, PhD
- Executive Director: Susan K. Gurley, JD
- Revenue: $1,626,423 (2020)
- Expenses: $ 1,121,194 (2020)
- Employees: 4 (2020)
- Volunteers: 100 (2020)
- Website: www.adaa.org
- Formerly called: Phobia Society of America, Anxiety Disorders Association

The Anxiety and Depression Association of America (ADAA) is a U.S. nonprofit organization located in Silver Spring, Maryland dedicated to increasing awareness of and improving the diagnosis, treatment, and cure of anxiety disorders in children and adults. The organization is involved in education, training, and research for anxiety and stress-related disorders. Their mission statement is to promote the prevention, treatment, and cure of anxiety, depression, and other stress-related disorders through education, practice, and research.

They have published several self-improvement books, such as Facing Panic, and Triumph Over Shyness: Conquering Social Anxiety Disorder, in an attempt to assist those with anxiety disorders.

== History ==
The Anxiety Disorders Association (originally called the Phobia Society of America) was founded by Jerilyn Ross, Robert Dupont, Martin Seif, Arthur Hardy, and Manuel Zane in 1980. It was officially incorporated on December 1, 1980, and was renamed to the Anxiety Disorders Association in 1990.

In spring 2008, ADAA launched the "Treat It, Don't Repeat It: Break Free From OCD" campaign, a national educational campaign relating to Obsessive–compulsive disorder. The campaign included public service announcements featuring Howie Mandel, Tony Shalhoub, and David Hoberman.

In June 2008, it was announced that ADAA would join with HealthCentral to provide further information, advice, and support to those with anxiety disorders. ADAA would create a blog to be used as an additional resource to HealthCentral's own website for anxiety disorders. Other features such as video interviews with ADAA experts and help for those with specific phobias were also planned.

In 2012, the organization's name was changed to its current name to better reflect and broaden their mission, as well as the comorbidity of both anxiety and depression.

== Research ==
ADAA has funded over $1 million to 500+ anxiety disorder and depression early career clinicians and researchers since developing their awards program in 1999.
