= Johnny Merriman =

American sports coach, athletics administrator (1899–1986)

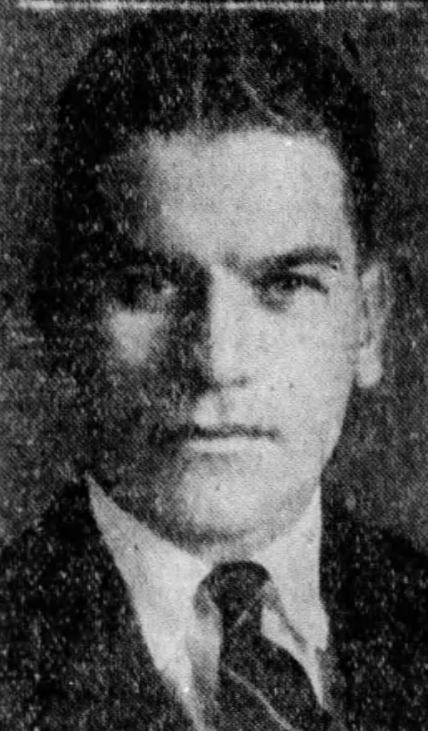
- Merriman pictured in the Hartford Courant', 1926

Biographical details
- Born: March 22, 1899; Mechanicville, New York, U.S.
- Died: June 26, 1986 (aged 87); Sun City, Arizona, U.S.

Playing career

Football
- 1918: Union (NY)
- c. 1919–1922: Springfield

Basketball
- c. 1920: Springfield

Baseball
- 1922: Springfield
- Positions: Halfback (football); Left fielder (baseball)

Coaching career (HC unless noted)

Football
- 1923–1924: Worcester Academy (MA) (assistant)
- 1925: Trinity (CT) (backfield)
- 1926–1928: Trinity (CT)
- 1929–1945: Coast Guard

Basketball
- 1923–1925: Worcester Academy (MA)
- 1929–1939: Coast Guard

Baseball
- 1924–1925: Worcester Academy (MA)
- 1926–1929: Trinity (CT)

Head coaching record
- Overall: 50–85–11 (college football); 48–84 (college basketball); 11–33–3 (college baseball)

John Spencer Merriman Jr. (March 22, 1899 – June 26, 1986) was an American football, basketball, and baseball coach. He served as the head football at Trinity College in Hartford, Connecticut from 1926 to 1928 and the United States Coast Guard Academy in New London, Connecticut from 1929 to 1945.

Merriman was born on March 22, 1899, in Mechanicville, New York. He grew up in Holyoke, Massachusetts, where he attended Holyoke High School. Merriman went to Union College in Schenectady, New York, where he played football as a freshman before transferring to Springfield College in Springfield, Massachusetts. At Springfield, he played football, basketball, and baseball, and also worked as a student coach in football, baseball, and soccer. After graduating from Springfield, Merriman began his coaching career at Worcester Academy in Worcester, Massachusetts, serving as assistant athletic director, assistant football coach, and head coach of basketball and baseball for two years. He joined the coaching staff at Trinity College in 1925 at backfield coach for the football team under head coach Henry W. Clark. A year later, he succeeded Clark as head football coach.

Merriman retired from the United States Coast Guard with the rank of commander in 1957. He then spent 11 years at the Massachusetts Institute of Technology (MIT), where he served as assistant athletic director, director of intramural sports, and golf coach. Merriman died on June 26, 1986, in Sun City, Arizona.

== Head coaching record ==
=== College football ===
Year	Team	Overall	Conference	Standing	Bowl/playoffs
Trinity Bantams (Independent) (1926–1928)
1926	Trinity	2–4			
1927	Trinity	2–4			
1928	Trinity	0–5–1			
Trinity:		4–13–1			
Coast Guard Bears (Independent) (1929–1945)
1929	Coast Guard	1–6–1			
1930	Coast Guard	3–5			
1931	Coast Guard	3–2–1			
1932	Coast Guard	1–3–2			
1933	Coast Guard	3–2–1			
1933	Coast Guard	1–6			
1935	Coast Guard	2–5			
1936	Coast Guard	2–2–3			
1937	Coast Guard	3–3–1			
1938	Coast Guard	2–6			
1939	Coast Guard	0–8			
1940	Coast Guard	4–4			
1941	Coast Guard	6–2			
1942	Coast Guard	6–2			
1943	Coast Guard	3–6			
1944	Coast Guard	6–3			
1945	Coast Guard	0–7–1			
Coast Guard:		46–72–10			
Total:		50–85–11			
