= Coast Guard Bears football =

College football team

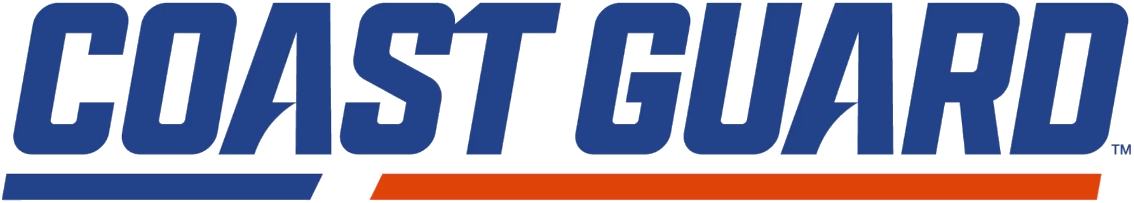
- First season: 1922; 104 years ago
- Athletic director: Dan Rose
- Head coach: C. C. Grant; 6th season, 15–26 (.366)
- Location: New London, Connecticut
- Stadium: Cadet Memorial Field (capacity: 4,500)
- NCAA division: Division III
- Conference: NEWMAC
- Colors: Blue and orange
- All-time record: 358–475–19 (.431)
- Bowl record: 0–1 (.000)

Conference championships
- 2

Division championships
- 2
- Rivalries: Merchant Marine (Secretaries' Cup)
- Mascot: Bears
- Website: coastguardathletics.com/football

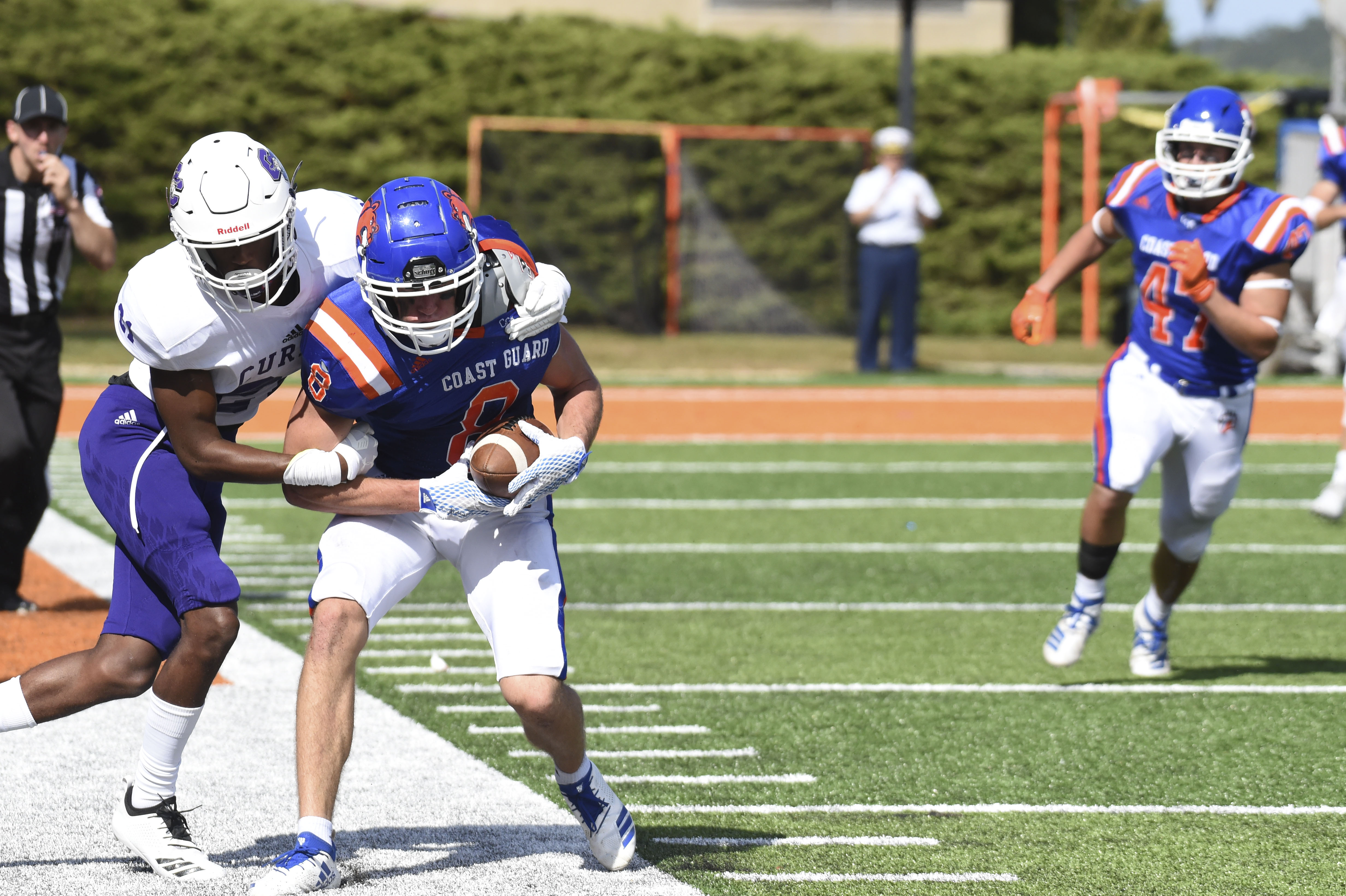
The Coast Guard Academy Football team playing against the Curry College team in September 2019.

The Coast Guard Bears football team represents the United States Coast Guard Academy in college football at the NCAA Division III level. The Bears are members of the New England Women's and Men's Athletic Conference (NEWMAC), fielding its team in the NEWMAC since 2017. The Bears play their home games at Cadet Memorial Field in New London, Connecticut.

The team's head coach is C. C. Grant, who took over the position for the 2020 season.

== Conference affiliations ==
- Independent (1922–1923, 1926–1991)
- Freedom Football Conference (1992–2003)
- Liberty League (2004–2005)
- New England Football Conference (2006–2016)
- New England Women's and Men's Athletic Conference (2017–present)

== Year-by-year results ==
National champions	Conference champions	Bowl game berth	Playoff berth

Season	Year	Head coach	Association	Division	Conference	Record							Postseason	Final ranking
Season	Year	Head coach	Association	Division	Conference	Overall			Conference				Postseason	Final ranking
Season	Year	Head coach	Association	Division	Conference	Win	Loss	Tie	Finish	Win	Loss	Tie	Postseason	Final ranking
Coast Guard Bears
1922	1922	Raymond V. Marron	NCAA	—	Independent	0	3	0					—	—
1923	1923	Raymond V. Marron	NCAA	—	Independent	0	3	0					—	—
No team from 1924 to 1925
1926	1926	Walter R. Richards	NCAA	—	Independent	2	2	0					—	—
1927	1927	Walter R. Richards	NCAA	—	Independent	1	6	0					—	—
1928	1928	Walter R. Richards	NCAA	—	Independent	3	3	2					—	—
1929	1929	Johnny Merriman	NCAA	—	Independent	1	6	1					—	—
1930	1930	Johnny Merriman	NCAA	—	Independent	4	5	0					—	—
1931	1931	Johnny Merriman	NCAA	—	Independent	3	2	1					—	—
1932	1932	Johnny Merriman	NCAA	—	Independent	1	3	2					—	—
1933	1933	Johnny Merriman	NCAA	—	Independent	3	2	1					—	—
1934	1934	Johnny Merriman	NCAA	—	Independent	1	6	0					—	—
1935	1935	Johnny Merriman	NCAA	—	Independent	2	5	0					—	—
1936	1936	Johnny Merriman	NCAA	—	Independent	2	2	3					—	—
1937	1937	Johnny Merriman	NCAA	—	Independent	3	3	1					—	—
1938	1938	Johnny Merriman	NCAA	—	Independent	2	6	0					—	—
1939	1939	Johnny Merriman	NCAA	—	Independent	0	8	0					—	—
1940	1940	Johnny Merriman	NCAA	—	Independent	4	4	0					—	—
1941	1941	Johnny Merriman	NCAA	—	Independent	6	2	0					—	—
1942	1942	Johnny Merriman	NCAA	—	Independent	6	2	0					—	—
1943	1943	Johnny Merriman	NCAA	—	Independent	3	6	0					—	—
1944	1944	Johnny Merriman	NCAA	—	Independent	6	3	0					—	—
1945	1945	Johnny Merriman	NCAA	—	Independent	0	7	1					—	—
1946	1946	Nelson Nitchman	NCAA	—	Independent	3	5	0					—	—
1947	1947	Nelson Nitchman	NCAA	—	Independent	2	3	2					—	—
1948	1948	Nelson Nitchman	NCAA	—	Independent	4	3	0					—	—
1949	1949	Nelson Nitchman	NCAA	—	Independent	5	3	0					—	—
1950	1950	Nelson Nitchman	NCAA	—	Independent	3	4	0					—	—
1951	1951	Nelson Nitchman	NCAA	—	Independent	6	0	1					—	—
1952	1952	Nelson Nitchman	NCAA	—	Independent	5	2	0					—	—
1953	1953	Nelson Nitchman	NCAA	—	Independent	4	2	1					—	—
1954	1954	Nelson Nitchman	NCAA	—	Independent	3	4	0					—	—
1955	1955	Nelson Nitchman	NCAA	College Division	Independent	4	3	0					—	—
1956	1956	Nelson Nitchman	NCAA	College Division	Independent	2	5	0					—	—
1957	1957	Nelson Nitchman	NCAA	College Division	Independent	2	5	0					—	—
1958	1958	Nelson Nitchman	NCAA	College Division	Independent	2	4	1					—	—
1959	1959	Otto Graham	NCAA	College Division	Independent	3	5	0					—	—
1960	1960	Otto Graham	NCAA	College Division	Independent	5	3	0					—	—
1961	1961	Otto Graham	NCAA	College Division	Independent	4	4	0					—	—
1962	1962	Otto Graham	NCAA	College Division	Independent	5	2	1					—	—
1963	1963	Otto Graham	NCAA	College Division	Independent	8	1	0					L Tangerine Bowl	—
1964	1964	Otto Graham	NCAA	College Division	Independent	3	5	0					—	—
1965	1965	Otto Graham	NCAA	College Division	Independent	4	4	0					—	—
1966	1966	Frank Kapral	NCAA	College Division	Independent	0	8	0					—	—
1967	1967	Frank Kapral	NCAA	College Division	Independent	0	8	0					—	—
1968	1968	Tad Schroeder	NCAA	College Division	Independent	3	7	0					—	—
1969	1969	Tad Schroeder	NCAA	College Division	Independent	2	8	0					—	—
1970	1970	Tad Schroeder	NCAA	College Division	Independent	5	5	0					—	—
1971	1971	Tad Schroeder	NCAA	College Division	Independent	8	2	0					—	—
1972	1972	Tad Schroeder	NCAA	College Division	Independent	3	7	0					—	—
1973	1973	Tad Schroeder	NCAA	Division III	Independent	8	2	0					—	—
1974	1974	Otto Graham	NCAA	Division III	Independent	4	6	0					—	—
1975	1975	Otto Graham	NCAA	Division III	Independent	8	2	0					—	—
1976	1976	Bill Hickey	NCAA	Division III	Independent	1	8	0					—	—
1977	1977	Bill Hickey	NCAA	Division III	Independent	5	4	0					—	—
1978	1978	Bill Hickey	NCAA	Division III	Independent	3	7	0					—	—
1979	1979	Bill Hickey	NCAA	Division III	Independent	1	8	1					—	—
1980	1980	Larry Rutledge	NCAA	Division III	Independent	4	6	0					—	—
1981	1981	Larry Rutledge	NCAA	Division III	Independent	3	7	0					—	—
1982	1982	Larry Rutledge	NCAA	Division III	Independent	4	6	0					—	—
1983	1983	Bob Campiglia	NCAA	Division III	Independent	4	6	0					—	—
1984	1984	Bob Campiglia	NCAA	Division III	Independent	3	7	0					—	—
1985	1985	Bob Campiglia	NCAA	Division III	Independent	4	6	0					—	—
1986	1986	Thomas H. Bell	NCAA	Division III	Independent	4	5	0					—	—
1987	1987	Thomas H. Bell	NCAA	Division III	Independent	6	2	0					—	—
1988	1988	Thomas H. Bell	NCAA	Division III	Independent	9	1	0					—	—
1989	1989	Thomas H. Bell	NCAA	Division III	Independent	5	4	0					—	—
1990	1990	Thomas H. Bell	NCAA	Division III	Independent	4	5	0					—	—
1991	1991	Thomas H. Bell	NCAA	Division III	Independent	6	2	0					—	—
1992	1992	Thomas H. Bell	NCAA	Division III	FFC	1	8	0	8th	1	6	0	—	—
1993	1993	Bill Schmitz	NCAA	Division III	FFC	4	5	0	4th	3	3	0	—	—
1994	1994	Bill Schmitz	NCAA	Division III	FFC	4	5	0	5th	2	4	0	—	—
1995	1995	Bill Schmitz	NCAA	Division III	FFC	4	6	0	6th	2	4	0	—	—
1996	1996	Bill Schmitz	NCAA	Division III	FFC	8	3	0	T–1st	5	1	0	L NCAA Division III First Round	—
1997	1997	Chuck Mills	NCAA	Division III	FFC	9	2	0	1st	6	0	0	L NCAA Division III First Round	—
1998	1998	Bob Estock	NCAA	Division III	FFC	1	8	0	7th	0	6	0	—	—
1999	1999	Bill George	NCAA	Division III	FFC	1	9	0	T–6th	1	5	0	—	—
2000	2000	Bill George	NCAA	Division III	FFC	2	8	0	7th	0	6	0	—	—
2001	2001	Bill George	NCAA	Division III	FFC	2	7	0	T–6th	1	5	0	—	—
2002	2002	Bill George	NCAA	Division III	FFC	2	7	0	6th	1	5	0	—	—
2003	2003	Bill George	NCAA	Division III	FFC	4	5	0	T–3rd	3	3	0	—	—
2004	2004	Bill George	NCAA	Division III	Liberty League	1	8	0	8th	0	7	0	—	—
2005	2005	Bill George	NCAA	Division III	Liberty League	2	7	0	8th	0	7	0	—	—
2006	2006	Bill George	NCAA	Division III	NEFC	8	3	0	1st (Bogan)	7	0	0	L ECAC North Atlantic Bowl	—
2007	2007	Bill George	NCAA	Division III	NEFC	8	2	0	1st (Bogan)	7	0	0	—	—
2008	2008	Bill George	NCAA	Division III	NEFC	3	6	0	T–5th (Bogan)	3	4	0	—	—
2009	2009	Bill George	NCAA	Division III	NEFC	4	5	0	4th (Bogan)	4	3	0	—	—
2010	2010	Bill George	NCAA	Division III	NEFC	2	7	0	T–7th (Bogan)	1	6	0	—	—
2011	2011	Bill George	NCAA	Division III	NEFC	2	7	0	7th (Bogan)	2	5	0	—	—
2012	2012	Bill George	NCAA	Division III	NEFC	5	4	0	3rd (Bogan)	5	3	0	—	—
2013	2013	Bill George	NCAA	Division III	NEFC	3	7	0	T–5th	3	4	0	—	—
2014	2014	Bill George	NCAA	Division III	NEFC	3	7	0	T–6th	2	5	0	—	—
2015	2015	Bill George	NCAA	Division III	NEFC	5	5	0	4th	4	3	0	—	—
2016	2016	Bill George	NCAA	Division III	NEFC	3	7	0	6th	2	5	0	—	—
2017	2017	Bill George	NCAA	Division III	NEWMAC	3	7	0	T–6th	1	6	0	—	—
2018	2018	Bill George	NCAA	Division III	NEWMAC	7	3	0	T–2nd	5	2	0	—	—
2019	2019	Bill George	NCAA	Division III	NEWMAC	5	5	0	T–5th	2	5	0	—	—
2020–21	2020–21	C. C. Grant	NCAA	Division III	NEWMAC	0	1	0	n/a				—	—
2021	2021	C. C. Grant	NCAA	Division III	NEWMAC	2	8	0	7th	0	6	0	—	—
2022	2022	C. C. Grant	NCAA	Division III	NEWMAC	3	7	0	T–6th	1	5	0	—	—
2023	2023	C. C. Grant	NCAA	Division III	NEWMAC	5	5	0	T–4th	3	4	0	—	—
2024	2024	C. C. Grant	NCAA	Division III	NEWMAC	5	5	0	T–5th	3	4	0	—	—
2025	2025	C. C. Grant	NCAA	Division III	NEWMAC	7	3	0	T-2nd	5	2	0	—	—

== See also ==
- Secretaries' Cup
- Coast Guard Bears
