= Nelson Nitchman =

American sports coach (1908–1991)

Biographical details
- Born: December 21, 1908
- Died: March 4, 1991 (aged 82); Waterford, Connecticut, U.S.

Coaching career (HC unless noted)

Football
- 1936–1940: Union (NY)
- 1941: Colby
- 1942: Coast Guard (assistant)
- 1946–1958: Coast Guard

Basketball
- 1933–1941: Union (NY)
- 1942–1954: Coast Guard

Head coaching record
- Overall: 70–60–9 (football); 130–146 (basketball)

Nelson Wallace "Nels" Nitchman (December 21, 1908 – March 4, 1991) was an American football, basketball, and baseball coach. He served as the head football coach at Union College in Schenectady, New York, from 1936 to 1940, at Colby College in 1941, and at the United States Coast Guard Academy from 1946 to 1958. Nitchman was also the head basketball coach at Union from 1933 to 1941 and at the Coast Guard Academy from 1942 to 1954, tallying a career college basketball mark of 130–146.

== Coaching career ==
Nitchman was the head football coach at the United States Coast Guard Academy in New London, Connecticut. He held that position for 13 seasons, from 1946 until 1958. His coaching record at Coast Guard was 45–43–5.

== Death ==
Nitchman died on March 4, 1991, in Waterford, Connecticut.

== Head coaching record ==
=== Football ===
Year	Team	Overall	Conference	Standing	Bowl/playoffs
Union Dutchmen (Independent) (1936–1940)
1936	Union	4–4			
1937	Union	4–3–1			
1938	Union	3–3–1			
1939	Union	7–0–1			
1940	Union	3–5			
Union:		21–15–3			
Colby Mules (Maine Intercollegiate Athletic Association) (1941)
1941	Colby	4–2–1	1–0–1	2nd	
Colby:		4–2–1	1–0–1		
Coast Guard Cadets (Independent) (1946–1958)
1946	Coast Guard	3–5			
1947	Coast Guard	2–3–2			
1948	Coast Guard	4–3			
1949	Coast Guard	5–3			
1950	Coast Guard	3–4			
1951	Coast Guard	6–0–1			
1952	Coast Guard	5–2			
1953	Coast Guard	4–2–1			
1954	Coast Guard	3–4			
1955	Coast Guard	4–3			
1956	Coast Guard	2–5			
1957	Coast Guard	2–5			
1958	Coast Guard	2–4–1			
Coast Guard:		45–43–5			
Total:		70–60–9			
