= C. C. Grant =

American football and baseball coach (born c.1966)

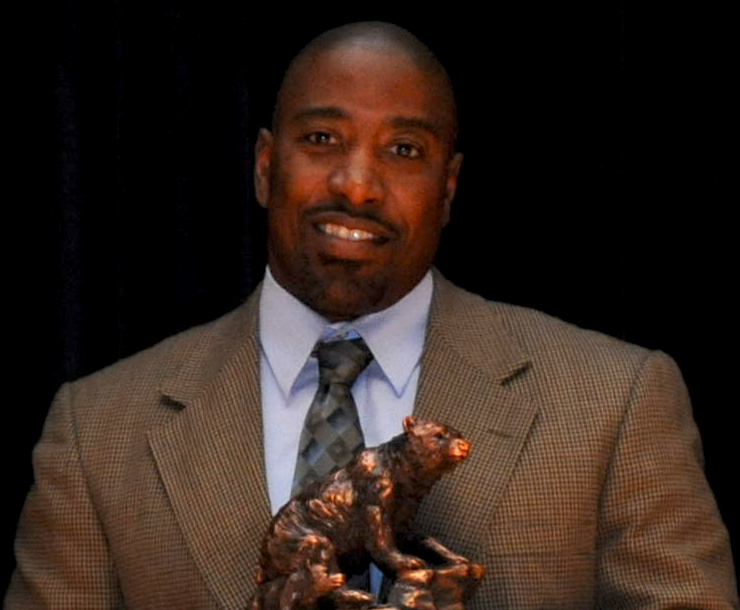
- Grant in 2010

Current position
- Title: Head coach
- Team: Coast Guard
- Conference: NEWMAC
- Record: 22–29

Biographical details
- Born: c. 1966 (age 59–60)
- Education: State University of New York at Cortland (1992)

Playing career
- 1988–1991: Cortland
- Position: Fullback

Coaching career (HC unless noted)

Football
- 1992–1993: Cortland (GA)
- 1994–1995: Cortland (assistant)
- 1996–1997: Cortland (OC)
- 1998–2003: Coast Guard (OC)
- 2004–2019: Coast Guard (co-DC)
- 2020–present: Coast Guard

Baseball
- 2000–2006: Coast Guard (assistant)
- 2007–2020: Coast Guard

Head coaching record
- Overall: 22–29 (football); 182–255 (baseball)

Accomplishments and honors

Awards
- As player: All-ECAC (1990)

Ulysses "C. C." Grant (born c. 1966) is an American college football coach and former baseball coach. He is the head football coach for the United States Coast Guard Academy, a position he has held since 2020. He previously was an assistant coach for Cortland. He also coached the Coast Guard Bears baseball team from 2007 to 2020.

Grant attended Williamson School District in Wayne County, New York and Cortland, where he played college football as a fullback.

Bill George, an assistant at Ithaca on the opposite side of the Cortaca Jug rivalry, invited Grant to join the staff at Coast Guard when he was named head coach. Upon George's retirement, Grant became the first African-American head football coach at any of the United States service academies.

== Head coaching record ==
=== Football ===
| Year | Team | Overall | Conference | Standing | Bowl/playoffs |
|---|---|---|---|---|---|
Coast Guard Bears (New England Women's and Men's Athletic Conference) (2020–present)
| 2020–21 | Coast Guard | 0–1 | 0–0 | N/A | |
| 2021 | Coast Guard | 2–8 | 0–6 | 7th | |
| 2022 | Coast Guard | 3–7 | 1–5 | T–6th | |
| 2023 | Coast Guard | 5–5 | 3–4 | T–4th | |
| 2024 | Coast Guard | 5–5 | 3–4 | T–5th | |
| 2025 | Coast Guard | 7–3 | 5–2 | T–2nd | |
| 2026 | Coast Guard | 0–0 | 0–0 | | |
| Coast Guard: | | 22–29 | 12–21 | | |
| Total: | | 22–29 | | | |

=== Baseball ===
Record table
| Season | Team | Overall | Conference | Standing | Postseason |
|---|---|---|---|---|---|
Coast Guard Bears (New England Women's and Men's Athletic Conference) (2007–2020)
| 2007 | Coast Guard | 12–17 | 5–7 | 7th | NEWMAC Tournament |
| 2008 | Coast Guard | 7–21 | 1–11 | 7th | |
| 2009 | Coast Guard | 7–23 | 2–10 | 7th | |
| 2010 | Coast Guard | 12–18 | 4–8 | 7th | |
| 2011 | Coast Guard | 21–16 | 9–9 | 7th | ECAC Tournament |
| 2012 | Coast Guard | 14–21 | 6–12 | 3rd | |
| 2013 | Coast Guard | 22–16 | 9–9 | 6th | ECAC Tournament |
| 2014 | Coast Guard | 13–22 | 8–9 | 6th | |
| 2015 | Coast Guard | 16–16 | 8–9 | 5th | |
| 2016 | Coast Guard | 16–21 | 8–9 | 8th | |
| 2017 | Coast Guard | 12–23 | 3–14 | | |
| 2018 | Coast Guard | 11–18 | 4–13 | 6th | |
| 2019 | Coast Guard | 16–19 | 4–13 | 5th | |
| 2020 | Coast Guard | 4–3 | 0–0 | N/A | |
| Coast Guard: | | 182–255 | 68–136 | | |
| Total: | | 182–255 | | | |
