= HealthCentral =

American healthcare company

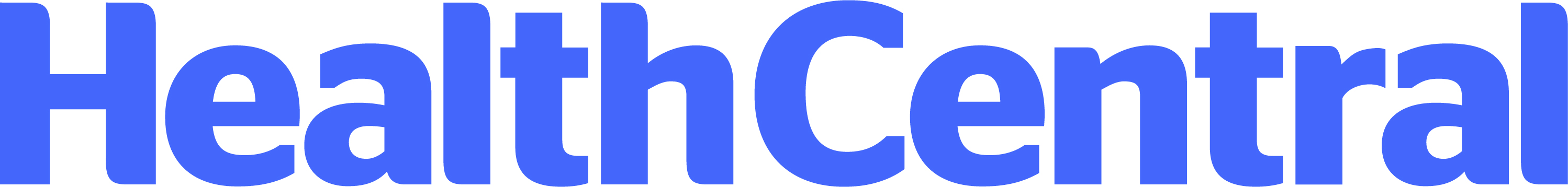
- Type: Private company
- Industry: Healthcare
- Founded: 1999
- Headquarters: Arlington, Virginia, United States
- Key people: Justin Chase (CEO)
- Website: www.healthcentralcorp.com

HealthCentral is an American privately owned digital health media company. The company owns and operates consumer health brands HealthCentral.com, TheBody.com, and PatientPower.info, as well as brands for medical professionals including MedCentral.com, TheBodyPro.com, and OncologyNewsCentral.com (formerly OBR Oncology).

== History ==
HealthCentral was founded by an emergency department doctor in 1999. The company was later acquired by a group of venture investors in 2005. Initial investments were made from Polaris Venture Partners, Sequoia Capital, The Carlyle Group, and Allen & Company.

InterActiveCorp made a significant minority investment in the company in 2008, and the initial group of investors joined in the round of funding to reinvest in HealthCentral. Later that year, the company bought HIV/AIDS websites TheBody.com and TheBodyPro.com.

In 2011, HealthCentral was acquired by Remedy Health Media, a digital health information and technology provider. Within two years of the purchase, the company was recognized by Crain's New York Business as one of the Top 50 Fastest Growing Companies of 2013. In 2017, Remedy Health Media was acquired by private equity firm Topspin Partners.

In 2019, Remedy Health Media purchased clinician-oriented Vertical Health, incorporating multiple patient and professional health websites into the company's portfolio. The following year, the company acquired Oncology Business Review, an oncology-focused digital media company, and PatientPower.info, a consumer-focused cancer patient network.

Amulet Capital Partners, a private equity firm focused on healthcare, acquired Remedy Health Media in 2021. The company appointed Steve Zatz, M.D., as chairman and CEO in September 2022. In June 2023, Remedy Health Media was renamed HealthCentral Corporation after its flagship digital brand. In November 2023, the company launched MedCentral.com, a medical website geared toward physicians and other health care professionals who care for patients with chronic and serious illness.

== Company ==
HeathCentral Corporation owns multiple websites with a focus on healthcare information for patients and professionals.

HealthCentral.com is a digital health destination serving patients living with chronic and serious illness, their partners, and the health professionals who care for them. The website covers more than 200 conditions, using expert contributors and a medical review board to oversee the accuracy of content.

Founded in 1995, TheBody.com provides medically reviewed information as well as news, support, and personal experiences on HIV and related issues to help people diagnosed with HIV/AIDS. Founded in 2002, TheBodyPro.com is a digital site to inform and support professionals who work in HIV education, prevention, care, and services.

PatientPower.info provides patients and caregivers dealing with cancer and other serious and chronic conditions with information from healthcare experts as well as personal accounts to assist them to get the best medical treatment possible.

OncologyNewsCentral.com (formerly OBR Oncology) is a digital media outlet focused exclusively on oncology, serving healthcare professionals and the industry that supports them.

HealthCentral Guides are condition-specific patient education magazines and publications distributed free of charge to physician waiting rooms across the U.S.

MedCentral.com is a medical website for physicians and health care professionals who care for patients with chronic and serious illness.

== Awards ==
In 2023, the company's brands won 16 awards at the 25th anniversary Digital Health Awards, which honors the best digital health resources; the brands also won 11 Digital Health Awards in fall 2022. HealthCentral.com was named the Healthcare Consumer Media Brand of 2023 by Medical Marketing and Media (MM+M). The site won this same award in 2022 and 2016. In 2021, HealthCentral.com won the long-form feature category in the Folio Eddie & Ozzie Awards, which recognize excellence in both print and digital editorial content and design. In 2020, the site won two awards at the Digital Health Awards.
