= Frank Kapral =

American football and wrestling coach (1929–2020)

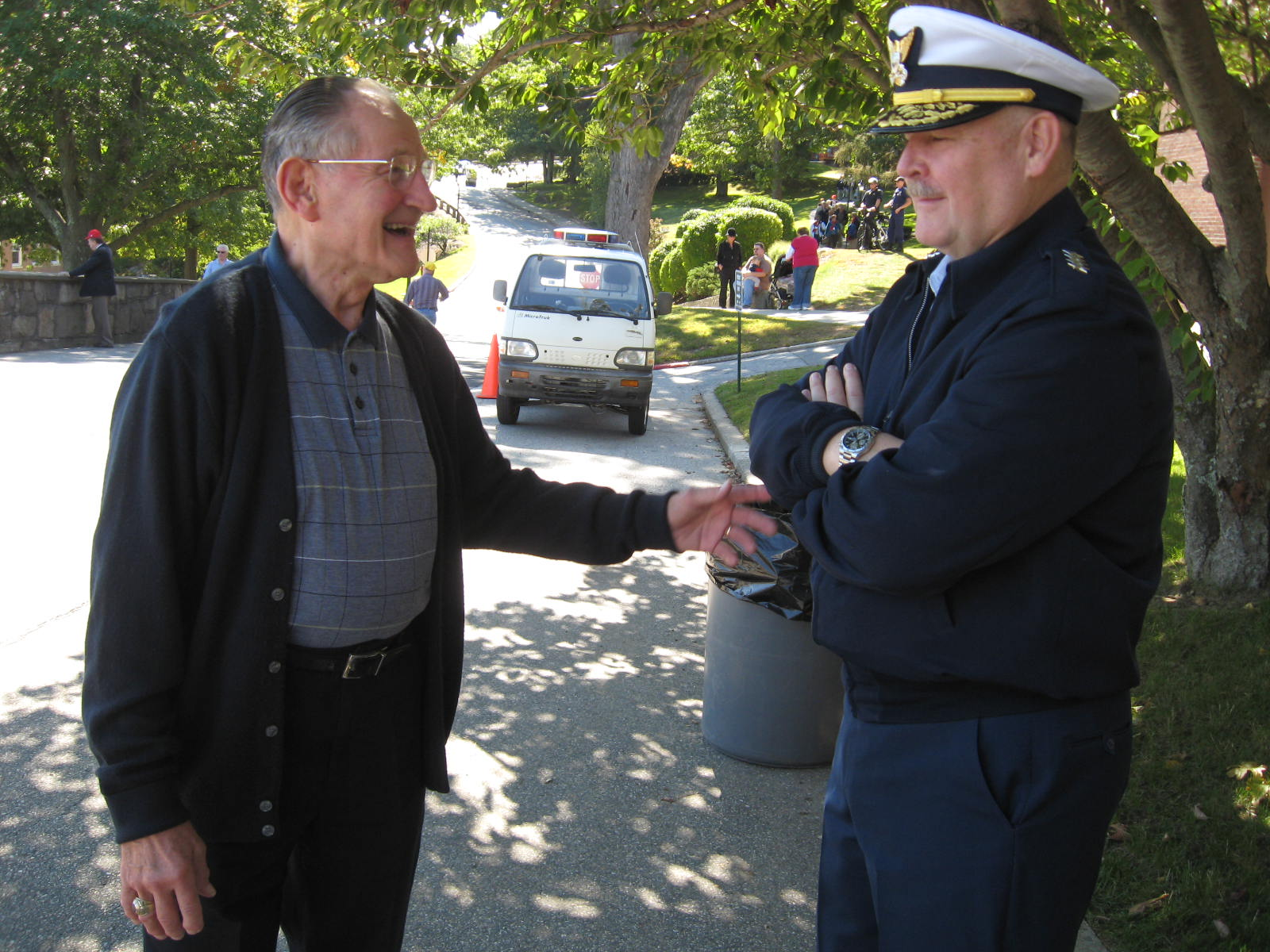
- Kapral with one of his former players, Coast Guard Commandant Thad Allen

Biographical details
- Born: February 15, 1929; Courtdale, Pennsylvania, U.S.
- Died: March 17, 2020 (aged 91); Palm Bay, Florida, U.S.

Playing career

Football
- 1950–1951: Michigan State
- Position: Guard

Coaching career (HC unless noted)

Football
- 1955: Coldwater HS (MI)
- 1956–1957: Dartmouth (freshmen line)
- 1958–1965: Coast Guard (line)
- 1966–1967: Coast Guard

Head coaching record
- Overall: 0–16 (college football)

Frank Samuel Kapral (February 15, 1929 – March 17, 2020) was an American football and wrestling coach.

== Personal life ==
Kapral was born in Courtdale, Pennsylvania, on February 15, 1929. He was the youngest of five children of George and Helen Kapral. He graduated from Luzerne High School, Pennsylvania, in 1946. In 1948, he graduated from Wyoming Seminary, and from 1948 to 1952 was a football player and wrestler at Michigan State.

Kapral received a B.A. degree in speech from Michigan State and later earned an M.A. degree in physical education.

Kapral and his wife Doris lived in East Lyme, Connecticut, in later life. They were married in 1951 and had five daughters, one son, ten grandchildren, and, as of 2020, thirteen great-grandchildren.

Kapral died on March 17, 2020, at the home of his son in Palm Bay, Florida. He was buried at Arlington National Cemetery on September 14, 2020.

== Career ==
He played for Michigan State from 1948 to 1952, and was drafted to the Green Bay Packers. He was forced to leave early in the season as he was called to active duty in the U.S. Army for the Korean War. After the war, he was a coach for football and wrestling at two high schools in Michigan, Dartmouth College, then the United States Coast Guard Academy in New London, Connecticut.

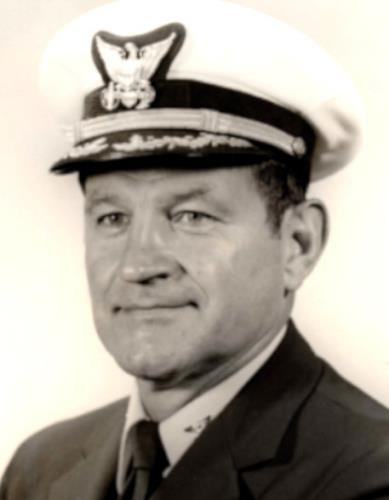
Coast Guard Captain Kapral

In 1962 he was appointed a line coach of the Coast Guard Academy football team under Head Coach Otto Graham, and was the head coach himself in the 1966 and 1967 seasons. His record as football head coach was 0–16. He was also an assistant track and field coach from 1959 to 1961, the head coach of wrestling from 1960 to 1965, assistant director of athletics from 1966 to 1980, and athletic department business manager from 1968 to 1980.

In 1976 he was inducted into the Athletics Hall of Fame at Wyoming Seminary in 1976 and the Coast Guard Academy in 1979. In 1988, he was named "Man of the Year" by New England College Wrestling.

He retired in 1984, at which point he was at the rank of captain.
