= Secretaries' Cup =

Annual American college football game

- Sport: Football
- Teams: Coast Guard Bears; Merchant Marine Mariners
- First meeting: October 15, 1949; 77 years ago Coast Guard, 21–14
- Latest meeting: November 14, 2026; Merchant Marine, 42–14
- Stadiums: Brooks Stadium (Kings Point) and Cadet Memorial Field (Coast Guard); Fenway Park (2025 only); Audi Field (2026 only)
- Trophy: Secretaries' Cup

Statistics
- Total meetings: 55
- All-time series: Merchant Marine leads, 39–16
- Trophy series: Merchant Marine leads, 32–14
- Largest victory: Merchant Marine, 42–0 (1992)
- Longest win streak: Merchant Marine, 7 (1965–1978)
- Current win streak: Merchant Marine, 2

Locations of Coast Guard and Merchant Marine

The Secretaries' Cup (Note: There is an apostrophe in the name.) is an annual college football game in the northeast United States between the U.S. Coast Guard Academy and the U.S. Merchant Marine Academy. Both academies compete in NCAA Division III athletics.

The Secretaries' Cup is an intense rivalry game for both schools. Though less well known than the Army–Navy Game, the Secretaries' Cup is often described as a small-college version of that matchup.

The two campuses are at opposite ends of Long Island Sound. The game alternates between the Coast Guard's Cadet Memorial Field in New London, Connecticut, and the Merchant Marine's Captain Tomb Field in Kings Point, New York just east of New York City. However, on November 15, 2025, the game was played for the first time at Fenway Park in Boston.

The game had been played on the last Saturday of the Division III football regular season (generally mid-November) from 1991 through 2005. When the Coast Guard Academy joined the New England Football Conference in 2006, the rivalry became a non-conference game and was moved to September. In 2017, the game moved back to November when the New England Women's and Men's Athletic Conference (NEWMAC) began sponsoring football with both teams as conference members.

== History ==
The first meeting between the schools was in 1949. Played at King's Point in front of 4,000 spectators, the Bears won 21–14 after scoring the game-winning touchdown with one minute remaining.

The rivalry was designated as the "Secretary's Cup" in 1981, when both academies were in the jurisdiction of the Department of Transportation. The name of the contest was pluralized when the United States Coast Guard moved to the Department of Homeland Security in 2003.

The games have been broadcast on ESPN's streaming networks since 2017. That year's meeting was played at 12 noon on Veterans Day, November 11.

The 2020 meeting, won 24–14 by Merchant Marine, was notable as the only Division III football game played in calendar 2020. The NCAA canceled the 2020 D-III football season due to the COVID-19 pandemic; it planned to move the division's championship tournament to spring 2021 before canceling it entirely. Nonetheless, the two academies chose to play their rivalry game on its normal schedule. Both schools had also chosen not to play football in spring 2021, making this their only game of the 2020–21 school year.

While the Secretaries' Cup is typically played at either school's campus, it was moved to Fenway Park in Boston for the 2025 edition. The 2026 game was held at Audi Field in Washington, D.C.

== Results ==
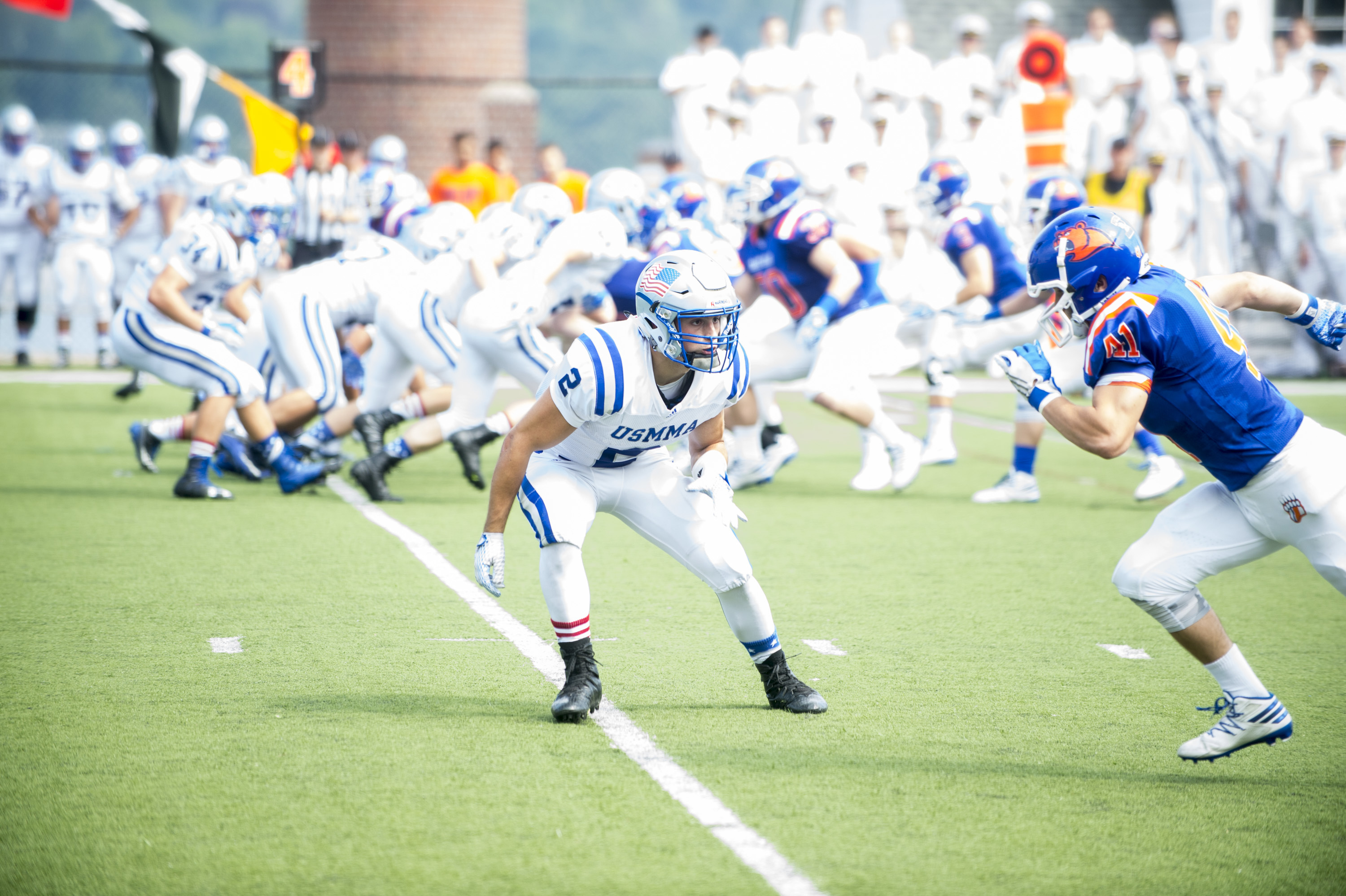
2016 game action

Through 2026, the Merchant Marine Academy has an overall lead in the series 39–16 (.709). Since the Secretaries' Cup was established in 1981, the Merchant Marine Academy leads 32–14 (.696). There have been no ties in the series.

Coast Guard victories	Merchant Marine victories	Tie games

No.	Date	Location	Winner	Score
1	1949	Kings Point, NY	Coast Guard	21–14
2	1965	New London, CT	Merchant Marine	17–8
3	1966	Kings Point, NY	Merchant Marine	41–6
4	1974	Kings Point, NY	Merchant Marine	14–12
5	1975	New London, CT	Merchant Marine	9–7
6	1976	Kings Point, NY	Merchant Marine	9–7
7	1977	New London, CT	Merchant Marine	10–6
8	1978	Kings Point, NY	Merchant Marine	10–7
9	1979	New London, CT	Coast Guard	30–23
10	1981	New London, CT	Coast Guard	14–7
11	1982	Kings Point, NY	Merchant Marine	14–7
12	1983	New London, CT	Merchant Marine	21–14
13	1984	Kings Point, NY	Merchant Marine	41–0
14	1985	New London, CT	Merchant Marine	42–14
15	1986	Kings Point, NY	Merchant Marine	28–0
16	1987	New London, CT	Merchant Marine	10–7
17	1988	Kings Point, NY	Coast Guard	35–7
18	1989	New London, CT	Merchant Marine	24–22
19	1990	Kings Point, NY	Coast Guard	21–17
20	1991	New London, CT	Coast Guard	25–20
21	1992	Kings Point, NY	Merchant Marine	42–0
22	1993	New London, CT	Coast Guard	31–23
23	1994	Kings Point, NY	Merchant Marine	21–6
24	1995	New London, CT	Coast Guard	27–9
25	1996	Kings Point, NY	Coast Guard	23–13
26	1997	New London, CT	Coast Guard	34–16
27	1998	Kings Point, NY	Merchant Marine	46–7
28	1999	New London, CT	Merchant Marine	24–21

No.	Date	Location	Winner	Score
29	2000	Kings Point, NY	Merchant Marine	28–21
30	2001	New London, CT	Merchant Marine	7–3
31	2002	Kings Point, NY	Merchant Marine	31–6
32	2003	New London, CT	Coast Guard	9–7
33	2004	Kings Point, NY	Merchant Marine	16–7
34	2005	New London, CT	Merchant Marine	21–5
35	2006	Kings Point, NY	Merchant Marine	21–7
36	2007	New London, CT	Coast Guard	36–31
37	2008	Kings Point, NY	Merchant Marine	34–7
38	2009	Kings Point, NY	Merchant Marine	33–27
39	2010	New London, CT	Coast Guard	10–8
40	2011	Kings Point, NY	Merchant Marine	35–28
41	2012	New London, CT	Merchant Marine	43–37
42	2013	Kings Point, NY	Merchant Marine	27–20
43	2014	New London, CT	Coast Guard	42–31
44	2015	Kings Point, NY	Merchant Marine	14–3
45	2016	New London, CT	Merchant Marine	31–27
46	2017	New London, CT	Merchant Marine	48–23
47	2018	Kings Point, NY	Coast Guard	26–12
48	2019	New London, CT	Merchant Marine	56–41
49	2020	Kings Point, NY	Merchant Marine	24–14
50	2021	New London, CT	Merchant Marine	49–14
51	2022	Kings Point, NY	Merchant Marine	41–33
52	2023	New London, CT	Merchant Marine	39–27
53	2024	Kings Point, NY	Coast Guard	42–21
54	2025	Boston, MA	Merchant Marine	39–38
55	2026	Washington, DC	Merchant Marine	42–14
Series: Merchant Marine leads 39–16

- Note: there were no games for the following years; 1950–1964, 1967–1973 and 1980

== See also ==
- Commander-in-Chief's Trophy
- List of NCAA college football rivalry games
