= Bill Hickey (American football coach) =

American football coach

Coaching career (HC unless noted)
- 1976–1979: Coast Guard

Head coaching record
- Overall: 11–26–1

Bill Hickey is an American football coach.

== Coaching career ==
Hickey was the head football coach for the Coast Guard Bears located in New London, Connecticut. He held that position for 4 seasons, from 1976 until 1979. His coaching record at Coast Guard was 11 wins, 26 losses and 1 tie.
