= Larry Rutledge =

American football coach

Coaching career (HC unless noted)
- 1980–1982: Coast Guard

Head coaching record
- Overall: 7–21

Larry Rutledge is an American football coach.

== Coaching career ==
Rutledge was the head football coach for the Coast Guard Bears located in New London, Connecticut. He held that position for three seasons, from 1980 until 1982. His coaching record at Coast Guard was seven wins and 21 losses.
