= Catherine Samali Kavuma =

Ugandan novelist

- Born: Nkokonjeru, Uganda
- Education: Loreto Convent School, Msongari, in Nairobi, Kenya; St. Francis de Sales Convent in Tring, Hertfordshire
- Alma mater: State University of New York (SUNY) College at Cortland (Bachelor's degree in Anthropology, specialising in Archeology)
- Occupation: novelist
- Children: 2

Catherine Samali Kavuma (born 1960) is a novelist and a prominent Ugandan personality.

In the mid-1980s Ms. Kavuma moved to Washington, D.C. to work with the Ambassador of Uganda to the United States, Elizabeth Bagaya. She later became employed with the Embassy of Canada. Two years on she was offered employment with the World Bank as a Program Assistant in the office of the executive director for Africa in 1989. She retired from the World Bank in 2014.

== Publications ==
- Malita and other stories. New Jersey: Sungai Books, 2002 (183 pp.). ISBN 1-889218-28-6 HB / 1-889218-29-4 PB.
