= Jerilyn Ross =

American psychotherapist

Jerilyn Ross (December 20, 1946, in the Bronx, New York – January 7, 2010, at Sibley Memorial Hospital in Washington, D.C.) was an American psychotherapist, phobia expert, and mental health activist. The New York Times' Benedict Carey described her as "one of the country’s most visible and effective advocates for those with mental health problems."

Ross was born in the Bronx and graduated from the State University of New York at Cortland in 1968. She then worked as a math teacher at an elementary school in New York City before receiving her master's in psychology from The New School in 1975. In 1980, she co-founded the Anxiety and Depression Association of America with Robert DuPont, after previously working in his psychiatric practice. She served as the association's director from then until her death.

From 1987 to 1992, she hosted her own weekly radio show on WRC, where she was known as the "phobia lady". On the show, she gave advice to callers who had phobia of a given thing; an especially common complaint she received was that callers were afraid to drive over the Chesapeake Bay Bridge in Maryland.

She died on January 7, 2010, of cancer, at the age of 63.

== Books ==
- Triumph Over Fear (with Rosalynn Carter) (Bantam, 1994)
- One Less Thing to Worry About (with Robin Cantor-Cooke) (Ballantine, 2009)
