= Ed Decker (American football) =

American football coach

Biographical details
- Born: January 23, 1934; Binghamton, New York, U.S.
- Died: June 6, 2016 (aged 82); Scranton, Pennsylvania, U.S.
- Education: Cortland

Coaching career (HC unless noted)

Football
- 1965–1966: Carthage HS (NY)
- 1967–1970: Henninger HS (NY)
- 1971–1973: Penfield HS (NY)
- 1974–1977: Columbia (assistant)
- 1978–1979: Ithaca (assistant)
- 1980–1982: Cortland

Head coaching record
- Overall: 13–17 (college)

Edwin Jay Decker (January 23, 1934 – June 6, 2016) was the head football coach at State University of New York at Cortland in Cortland, New York from 1980 to 1982, where he accumulated a record of 13–17. Prior to that, he had been an assistant at Columbia University and a head coach at several high schools in the state of New York.

== Head coaching record ==
=== College ===
Year	Team	Overall	Conference	Standing	Bowl/playoffs
Cortland Red Dragons (NCAA Division III independent) (1980–1982)
1980	Cortland	3–7			
1981	Cortland	6–4			
1982	Cortland	4–6			
Cortland State:		13–17			
Total:		13–17			
