= Bob Estock =

American football player and coach

Playing career
- 1966–1967: Colorado State
- Position: End

Coaching career (HC unless noted)
- 1969: Bridgeport (freshmen)
- 1970: Milford HS (CT) (assistant)
- 1976–1978: Coast Guard (assistant)
- 1979–?: Davidson (assistant)
- c. 1985–1996: Yale (assistant)
- 1997: Coast Guard (AHC)
- 1998: Coast Guard

Head coaching record
- Overall: 1–8

Robert S. Estock is an American former football coach. He served as the head football coach at the United States Coast Guard Academy in New London, Connecticut for one season, in 1998, compiling a record of 1–8.

== Head coaching record ==
Year	Team	Overall	Conference	Standing	Bowl/playoffs
Coast Guard Bears (Freedom Football Conference) (1998)
1999	Coast Guard	1–8	0–6	7th	
Coast Guard:		1–8	0–6		
Total:		1–8			
