= Tad Schroeder =

American football coach

Biographical details
- Born: February 29, 1936; Cincinnati, Ohio, U.S.
- Died: February 13, 2022 (aged 85)

Playing career

Football
- 1957: Cincinnati

Baseball
- 1956: Cincinnati

Swimming
- 1958: Cincinnati

Coaching career (HC unless noted)

Football
- 1958–1960: Cincinnati (assistant)
- 1962–1967: Army (assistant)
- 1968–1973: Coast Guard

Head coaching record
- Overall: 29–31

Tad Arnold Schroeder (February 29, 1936 – February 13, 2022) was an American college football coach. He served as the head football coach at the United States Coast Guard Academy in New London, Connecticut, for six seasons, from 1968 to 1973, compiling a record of 29–31. Schroeder was an assistant football coach at the University of Cincinnati from 1958 to 1960 and at the United States Military Academy from 1962 to 1967.

Schroeder lettered in three sports at the University of Cincinnati, baseball in 1956, football in 1957, and swimming in 1958. He died on February 13, 2022, after suffering from Alzheimer's disease for two years.

== Head coaching record ==
Year	Team	Overall	Conference	Standing	Bowl/playoffs
Coast Guard Bears (NAIA Division I independent) (1968–1972)
1968	Coast Guard	3–7			
1969	Coast Guard	2–8			
1970	Coast Guard	5–5			
1971	Coast Guard	8–2			
1972	Coast Guard	3–7			
Coast Guard Bears (NCAA Division III independent) (1973)
1973	Coast Guard	8–2			
Coast Guard:		29–31			
Total:		29–31			
