= Scott A. Gordon =

9th President of Stephen F. Austin State University
- In office August 17, 2019 – April 10, 2022
- Preceded by: Baker Pattillo
- Succeeded by: Steve Westbrook

Personal details
- Born: October 31, 1967 (age 58) Malone, New York, U.S.
- Education: SUNY at Cortland (B.A.); University of Tennessee (M.S., Ph.D.)
- Website: SFA President Website

Scott A. Gordon served as the ninth president of Stephen F. Austin State University from August 17, 2019, to April 10, 2022.

== Early life and education ==
Gordon is a native of Malone, New York, and was a first-generation college student. He received his bachelor's degree in biology from the State University of New York at Cortland and earned a master's degree and doctorate in botany and mycology from the University of Tennessee in Knoxville. He also holds certifications in educational management and leadership from the Harvard University Graduate School of Education.

== Career ==
=== University of Southern Indiana ===
Gordon was affiliated with the University of Southern Indiana (USI) for 22 years (1994 to 2016) and served as dean of the Pott College of Science, Engineering and Education from 2005 to 2016. In addition, he served for 10 years as the faculty athletics representative, was named an NCAA faculty athletic representative fellow, and was vice president and treasurer of the Great Lakes Valley Conference, which includes 14 NCAA Division II institutions.

At USI, Gordon piloted a technology commercialization academy that allowed engineering and business students to develop ideas and business strategies around the commercialization of intellectual property.

=== Eastern Washington University ===
As Eastern Washington University (EWU) provost and vice president for academic affairs from 2016 to 2019, Gordon continued his work to provide students with real-world experience in finding useful applications for existing technologies. He developed partnerships with community colleges, business and industry, as well as government entities – work that was highlighted by a unique partnership of multiple businesses in The Catalyst, a 140,000-square-foot facility in downtown Spokane. He encouraged development of a new degree program based on course materials developed by Microsoft to produce graduates with data analytics experience in order to meet the fluctuating needs of 21st-century employers.

As EWU's chief academic officer, Gordon was charged with overseeing more than 500 faculty members in six academic colleges, with responsibility for academic policy and planning, distance education, international programs and institutional research. Gordon wanted to reorganize Academic Affairs, but left with the plan unfinished. Reorganization was not completed until two years after he left EWU.

=== Stephen F. Austin State University ===
At Stephen F. Austin State University (SFA) he was named sole finalist for the position of president on July 23, 2019, and unanimously confirmed by the SFA Board of Regents on August 17, 2019. The search for SFA's president was led by the Dallas-based firm R. William Funk & Associates.

At SFA, Gordon established a budget prioritization process and developed new tuition models to lower the cost of attendance. Gordon was instrumental in establishing several new programs including the first ever degree partnership (BS in Interdisciplinary Studies) with the Texas A&M Rellis Academic Alliance. Gordon's work also brought together a public private partnership with HCH Aviation to establish an aviation science degree.

Working with key faculty, Gordon was instrumental in developing the SFA Center for Applied Research where faculty, staff and students engage in research development projects that support academic programs and boost regional economic development.

During Gordon's tenure, he established the very popular Distinguished High School Partnership Program with schools across Texas. This program allowed highly qualified students from partner schools to receive scholarship money for up to four years based on their class rank and GPA. Students who apply to SFA from distinguished program schools, ranking in the top 10% of their class receive $5,000 per year, and students ranking in the 11-25% of their class with a 3.0 GPA or higher receive $3,000 per year. This program resulted increased freshman enrollment from partner schools.

Gordon and athletics director Ryan Ivey worked with universities across several states to re-establish football and grow the Western Athletic Conference (WAC) with SFA as a key member. SFA Officially joined the WAC on July 1, 2021. The WAC consisted of schools in Texas (Abilene Christian, SFA, Lamar, Tarleton, Sam Houston State, University of Texas Rio Grand Valley, University of Texas Arlington), Utah (Southern Utah University, Utah Tech University, Utah Valley), New Mexico (New Mexico State) and Arizona (Grand Canyon University).

On October 29, 2001, Gordon led the public launch of the Stephen F. Austin State University public phase of its $100 million fundraising campaign. Gordon was responsible for several large campaign gifts including an $8 million dollar gift to name the College of Fine Arts in honor of a longtime Nacogdoches resident who had a deep love of the community and the arts. Other large gifts were part of this fundraising effort, including the naming and dedication of the Loddie Naymola Basketball Performance Center, a $26 million basketball facility. The successful campaign exceeded the $100 million dollar goal.

On September 9, 2021, the SFA Faculty Senate voted no confidence in Gordon, after faculty anger for a Board of Regents approved contract extension and pay raise. They also cited initiatives with no results, breaches of shared governance, and troublesome personal behavior cited as "bullying and unreasonably impatient behavior both in public and in private.". Every Academic Dean and Academic Department Head joined the Faculty Senate in their concerns and support of the "no confidence" vote.

On April 10, 2022, at a meeting of the SFA Board of Regents, SFA announced that the university and President Gordon mutually agreed to end his tenure after faculty objected to his pay raise. The Board of Regents appointed Steve Westbrook as interim president to replace him. Gordon was paid $809,124.46 in severance plus up to $30,000 in moving expenses, eligible reimbursable expenses, as well as vacation days. Forty-five people signed confidentiality agreements constraining them from speaking about this deal including the Regents, deans, and accountants, which came to light two months later. The Nacogdoches Daily Sentinel reported: "Gordon gets 'approved talking points' in future job recommendations. Regents are not allowed to give an honest assessment."

Special Note: The Chair of Faculty Senate during this period presented a paper/presentation at the Association for Business Communications 88th (ABC) Annual International Conference in Denver. The paper was entitled: "Lessons in Institutional Communications: How Faculty Members Helped to Replace a University's President and Board of Regents". The paper/presentation described the coordinated effort and lobbying that took place over many years to move the university into a larger and financially robust state system versus the longstanding independent university. The details presented describe the resource generated motives for replacing the President and Board of Regents and brings into question the legitimacy of the information, accusations, and innuendos noted above. The faculty were successful in moving the university into the University of Texas System in order to have access to additional resources offered by and through the University of Texas.

=== Cornell University ===
In 2022, Gordon was named Executive Director of the Cornell Cooperative Extension in Franklin County, New York.
