= Bill Schmitz =

American football coach

Biographical details
- Born: March 30, 1954; Cincinnati, Ohio, U.S.
- Died: August 26, 2013 (aged 59); Tampa Bay, Florida, U.S.
- Education: Coast Guard Academy

Coaching career (HC unless noted)
- 1981–1983: Cincinnati (assistant)
- 1984–1985: Rice (assistant)
- 1986–1988: Vanderbilt (assistant)
- 1989: Vanderbilt (OC/WR)
- 1991: Eastern Michigan (OC)
- 1992: London Monarchs (QB/WR)
- 1993–1996: Coast Guard
- 1997–2002: Austin Peay
- 2003–2004: Jesuit HS (FL)
- 2005: UAB (TE/HB)
- 2006: UAB (WR)
- 2007–2008: Penn (OC/TE)
- 2011–2013: Land O' Lakes HS (FL) (OC)

Head coaching record
- Overall: 39–65
- Tournaments: 0–1 (NCAA D-III playoffs)

Accomplishments and honors

Awards
- FFC Coach of the Year (1996)

Bill Schmitz (March 30, 1954 – August 26, 2013) was an American football coach. He served as head football coach at the United States Coast Guard Academy from 1993 to 1996 and Austin Peay State University from 1997 to 2002, compiling a career college football record of 39–65.

== Coaching career ==
Schmitz served as the quarterbacks and receivers coach of the London Monarchs in the World League of American Football for the 1992 season.

== Head coaching record ==
Year	Team	Overall	Conference	Standing	Bowl/playoffs
Coast Guard Bears (Freedom Football Conference) (1993–1996)
1993	Coast Guard	4–5	3–3	4th	
1994	Coast Guard	4–5	2–4	5th	
1995	Coast Guard	4–6	2–4	6th	
1996	Coast Guard	8–3	5–1	T–1st	L NCAA Division III First Round
Coast Guard:		20–19	12–12		
Austin Peay Governors (NCAA Division I-AA independent) (1997–2000)
1997	Austin Peay	0–10			
1998	Austin Peay	4–7			
1999	Austin Peay	3–8			
2000	Austin Peay	2–9			
Austin Peay Governors (Pioneer Football League) (2001–2002)
2001	Austin Peay	3–7	0–3	4th (South)	
2002	Austin Peay	7–5	1–2	3rd (South)	
Austin Peay:		19–46	1–5		
Total:		39–65			
National championship Conference title Conference division title or championship game berth
