= Raymond V. Marron =

American football coach (1899–1978)

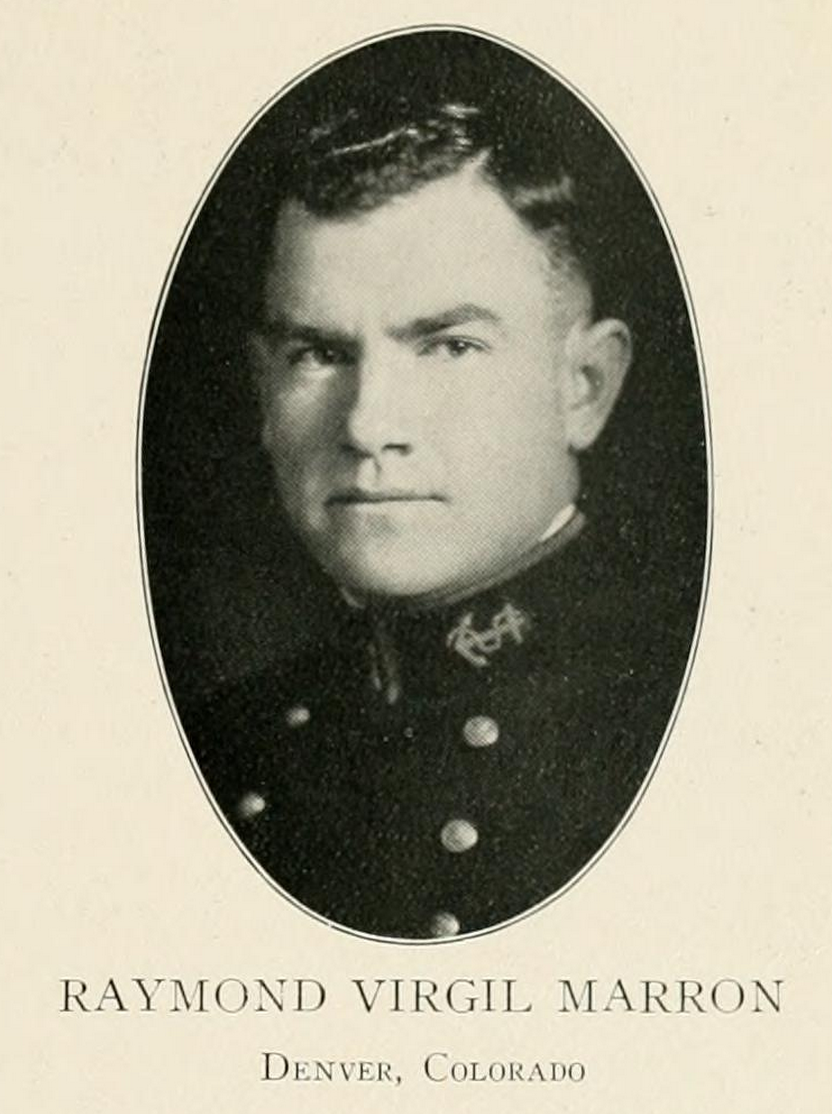
- Marron pictured in Tide Rips 1925, Coast Guard academy yearbook

Biographical details
- Born: May 21, 1899; Denver, Colorado, U.S.
- Died: July 16, 1978 (aged 79); Norfolk, Virginia, U.S.

Coaching career (HC unless noted)
- 1922–1923: Coast Guard
- 1928: All-Coast Guard

Head coaching record
- Overall: 0–6 (college)

Raymond Virgil Marron (May 21, 1899 – July 16, 1978) was an American football coach and United States Coast Guard officer. He served as the head football coach at the United States Coast Guard Academy in New London, Connecticut from the 1922 to 1923, compiling a record of 0–6.

In 1928, Marron was head coach of the all-Coast Guard football team. He reached the rank of commodore in the Coast Guard and commanded an attack flotilla during the Battle of Guam and the Philippines campaign during World War II. Marron died on July 16, 1978, in Norfolk, Virginia.

== Head coaching record ==
=== College ===
Year	Team	Overall	Conference	Standing	Bowl/playoffs
Coast Guard Bears (Independent) (1922–1923)
1922	Coast Guard	0–3			
1923	Coast Guard	0–3			
Coast Guard:		0–6			
Total:		0–6			
