= John Stigall =

American poet

w John Stigall (November 4, 1951 - November 12, 2009) was an American poet, Associate Professor of English, and poet-in-residence at Chattanooga State Technical Community College.

== Life and Academic Career ==
John Stigall received a Bachelor of Arts from the State University of New York at Cortland, and a Master of Arts from the State University of New York at Brockport. It was at Brockport in 1980 that he wrote his master's thesis: The Morale of Consciousness Wails. After attaining both degrees, he returned to Chattanooga and became Associate Professor of English and poet-in-residence at Chattanooga State Technical Community College. He founded and became editor of the campus literary magazine The Phoenix. The 2001 edition of The Phoenix was dedicated to him by Bill Stifler. He also received the Outstanding Young Educator Award and other honors while he taught. Towards the end of his professorship, he was asked to read from Broken Mirrors Reflect the World at Pennsylvania State University and SUNY; his book, Subject for Other Conversations, was subsequently taught at Pennsylvania State University for a brief period.

== Master's thesis ==
- The Morale of Consciousness Wails (1980). Call Numbers: Oversize PS3569.T4775 M6; Thesis 339

== Books ==
- In Avant Gardens (1983) Damballah Press ISBN 0-913649-01-5
- Broken Mirrors Reflect the World (1990) Damballah Press ISBN 0-913649-05-8
- Schizofrenzy (1993) Mammoth Books
- Subjects for Other Conversations (2001) Mammoth Books ISBN 0-9666028-6-2
- Smiling From the Ancestral Face (Incomplete)

== Poetry and other publications ==
John Stigall's poetry is influenced by his experiences living in the streets of New York, the existentialist philosophy and plays of Jean-Paul Sartre, struggles with Christian spirituality, and notably racism and prejudice.

Professor of Education Charles M. Achilles and clinical psychologist Julie E. Williams quote from his 1990 book Broken Mirrors Reflect The World in an article discussing the alienation of minorities in academic settings in the Peabody Journal of Education:

The contemporary poet, John Stigall (1990) has expressed the issue succinctly: Racism is stupid. Hatred is a bitch. Yeah, prejudice is like a house dog hunching on your leg. But you got to shake it off or it'll really screwwwwwww your head up.

In 2002, Angus Woodward published a positive review of John Stigall's book Subjects for Other Conversations in Xavier Review Journal.

His poem "Another Version of As Told in the Tombs" appears in the fourth volume of North Carolina State University's literary journal Obsidian III

The 2006 edition of the Volunteer State Community College literary journal Number One includes John Stigall's poem "Worship."

== Spoken wordrecordings ==
John Stigall also recorded two CDs with the progressive rock group Losfer Words as well as a two disc compilation of his works. He was signed to Losfer Words Records & Deep Blue Wonders Music Publishing ASCAP in 1993. The next year, Stigall and label founder David Flower appeared on the WUTC radio program Outside Pleasures in a special episode entitled "The Mentors". The broadcast showcased their adaptation of John Stigall's Broken Mirrors Reflect the World on what would become the Into the Life of this World CD and announced John Stigall's guest appearance on Losfer Words' Eye of the Storm CD on the track Midnight. Outside Pleasures was produced and hosted by Shaking Ray Levis, a well known improvisational group that has collaborated with John Zorn, David Greenberger, Fred Frith, Min Tanaka, Amy Denio, and Derek Bailey, as well as with many other critically acclaimed artists, including John Stigall. His CDs feature poetry readings backed by original musical compositions ranging from Blues to New Age performed by Losfer Words.

== CDs ==
- Into the Life of this World (1996) - contains poems from Broken Mirrors Reflect the World and early versions of poems that would later appear in Subjects for Other Conversations
- Another Conversation With the Bard (1998) - based on poems from Subjects for Other Conversations
- Into the Life of this World (1999) - reissue with new music not on the original
