= Bob Campiglia =

American football coach

Biographical details
- Born: April 21, 1941 (age 85)
- Education: Colorado State University

Coaching career (HC unless noted)
- 1969: Coast Guard (freshman HC)
- 1970: Holy Cross (OL)
- 1971–1982: Coast Guard (assistant)
- 1983–1985: Coast Guard
- 1986–1989: Vanderbilt (assistant)

Head coaching record
- Overall: 11–19

Bob Campiglia (born April 21, 1941) is an American former football coach.

== Coaching career ==
Campiglia was the head football coach for the Coast Guard Bears located in New London, Connecticut. He held that position for three seasons, from 1983 until 1985. His coaching record at Coast Guard was 11 wins and 19 losses.
