= Bill George (American football coach) =

American football player and coach

Playing career
- 1976–1979: Ithaca
- Position: Center

Coaching career (HC unless noted)
- 1982–1983: Ithaca (assistant)
- 1984: Princeton (assistant)
- 1985–1986: Ohio State (GA)
- 1987–1989: West Point Prep (NY) (assistant)
- 1990–1998: Ithaca (assistant)
- 1999–2019: Coast Guard

Head coaching record
- Overall: 75–126
- Bowls: 0–1

Accomplishments and honors

Championships
- 2 NEFC Bogan Division (2006–2007)

Bill George is an American former football coach. He served as the head football coach at the United States Coast Guard Academy in New London, Connecticut from 1999 to 2019, compiling a record of 75–126. His two best seasons were 2006 and 2007, with the Bears making the New England Football Conference (NEFC) championship in both years. George made minor headlines in October 2013 for washing his players underwear during the federal government shutdown. After the Coast Guard Academy defeated United States Merchant Marine Academy in 2014, George jumped into the Thames River. On November 12, 2019, George announced he was retiring from coaching in order "to do some things."

George is the author of a book "Home Fields," published in 2023, which is part memoir and part historical fiction.

== Head coaching record ==
Year	Team	Overall	Conference	Standing	Bowl/playoffs
Coast Guard Bears (Freedom Football Conference) (1999–2003)
1999	Coast Guard	1–9	1–5	T–6th	
2000	Coast Guard	2–8	0–6	7th	
2001	Coast Guard	2–7	1–5	T–6th	
2002	Coast Guard	2–7	1–5	6th	
2003	Coast Guard	4–5	3–3	T–3rd	
Coast Guard Bears (Liberty League) (2004–2005)
2004	Coast Guard	1–8	0–7	8th	
2005	Coast Guard	2–7	0–7	8th	
Coast Guard Bears (New England Football Conference) (2006–2016)
2006	Coast Guard	8–3	7–0	1st (Bogan)	L ECAC North Atlantic Bowl
2007	Coast Guard	8–2	7–0	1st (Bogan)	
2008	Coast Guard	3–6	3–4	T–5th (Bogan)	
2009	Coast Guard	4–5	4–3	4th (Bogan)	
2010	Coast Guard	2–7	1–6	T–7th (Bogan)	
2011	Coast Guard	2–7	2–5	7th (Bogan)	
2012	Coast Guard	5–4	5–3	3rd (Bogan)	
2013	Coast Guard	3–7	3–4	T–5th	
2014	Coast Guard	3–7	2–5	T–6th	
2015	Coast Guard	5–5	4–3	4th	
2016	Coast Guard	3–7	2–5	6th	
Coast Guard Bears (New England Women's and Men's Athletic Conference) (2017–2019)
2017	Coast Guard	3–7	1–6	T–6th	
2018	Coast Guard	7–3	5–2	T–3rd	
2019	Coast Guard	5–5	2–5	T–5th	
Coast Guard:		75–126	54–89		
Total:		75–126			
National championship Conference title Conference division title or championship game berth
