= Merchant Marine Mariners =

Sports teams

- University: United States Merchant Marine Academy
- Nickname: Mariners
- NCAA: Division III
- Conference: Skyline Conference, New England Women's and Men's Athletic Conference
- Athletic director: Kristofer Schnatz
- Location: Kings Point, New York
- Varsity teams: 18
- Football stadium: Captain James Harvey Tomb Field
- Basketball arena: Edwin J. O'Hara Hall
- Baseball stadium: Lower Roosevelt Field
- Colors: Blue and Gray
- Mascot: Salty the Sea Eagle
- Website: https://www.usmmasports.com/

The United States Merchant Marine Academy's intercollegiate sports teams are called the Mariners and they compete in the Division III of the NCAA, generally as once a charter member of the Landmark Conference. In 2016, they returned to the Skyline Conference in all sports. Men's sports include baseball, football, basketball, cross country, lacrosse, soccer, swimming & diving, tennis, wrestling and track and field. Women's sports include basketball, cross country, lacrosse, swimming and diving, track and field, and volleyball.

== Sports sponsored ==
Men's sports	Women's sports
Baseball	Cross country
Cross country	Lacrosse
Football	Soccer
Lacrosse	Swimming and diving
Soccer	Track and field^{1}
Swimming and diving	Volleyball
Tennis	Dinghy Sailing
Track and field^{1}	Offshore Sailing
Wrestling	Rowing
Dinghy Sailing	
Offshore Sailing	
Rowing	
^{1} – includes both indoor and outdoor.

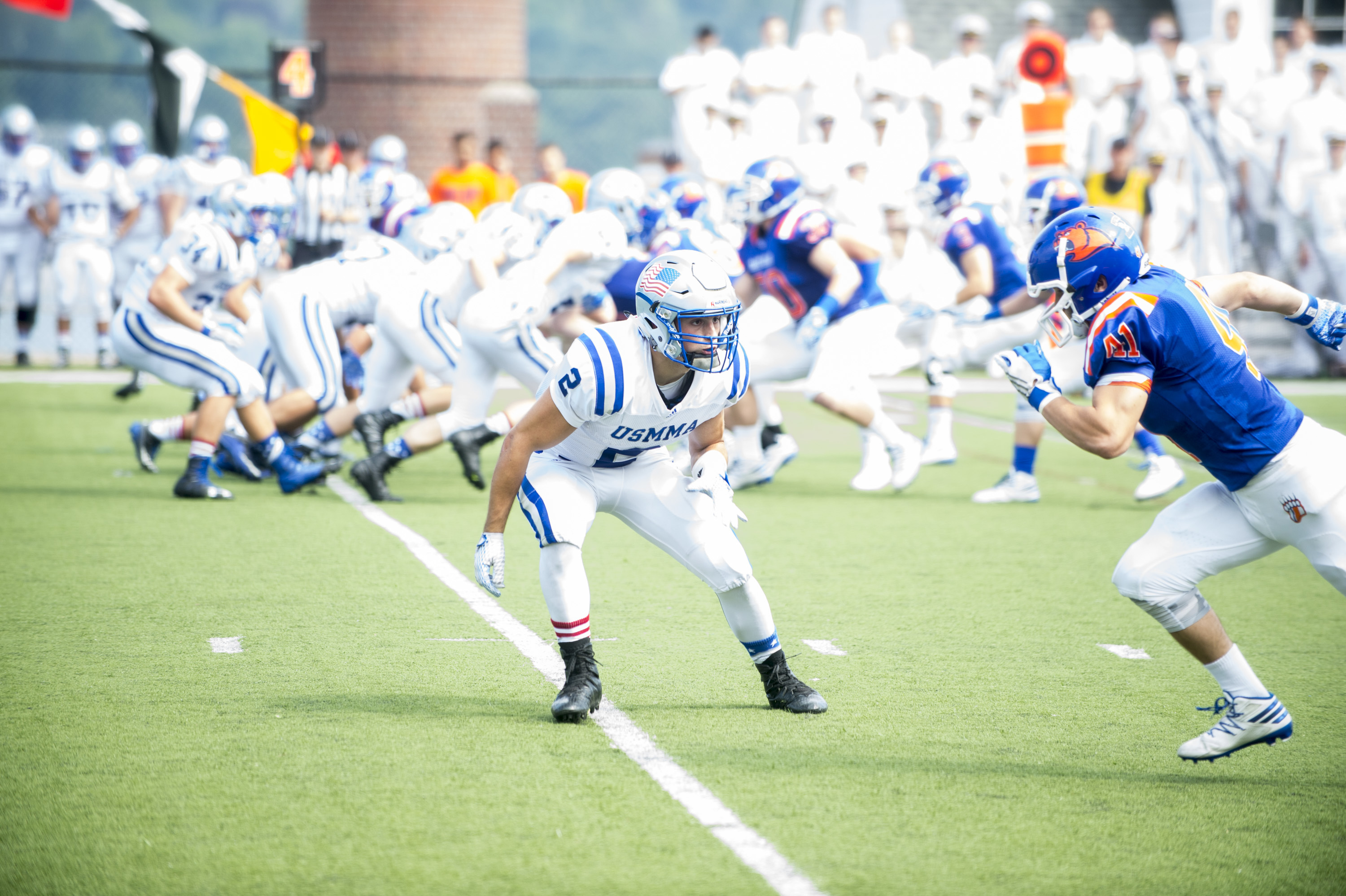
Merchant Marine vs. Coast Guard in the 2016 Secretaries' Cup

In football, the teams were an associate member of the Liberty League until 2017, when they joined the New England Women's and Men's Athletic Conference as an associate member. In collegiate wrestling, they are a member of the Centennial Conference. The USMMA was a member of the Skyline Conference until the 2006–07 season. The football teams also plays for an annual rivalry trophy in football, known as the Secretaries' Cup, against the Bears of the United States Coast Guard Academy.

In rugby, the USMMA competes in the MetNy Rugby Football Union where the team was the first division champion from 2005–2006.

The men's swim & dive team has had a long history of success, winning 20 straight conference championships (2000–2020) and are the only team to win the Landmark Conference championship until their departure from the conference in 2016.

The USMMA Varsity Intercollegiate Sailing Team competes at the Middle Atlantic Intercollegiate Sailing Association (MAISA) of the Intercollegiate Sailing Association (ICSA) and has fifteen National Championships to its credit, as well as nearly two dozen district titles. The Mariners won their first ICSA National (now "North American") Championship in 1979. The Mariners have five dinghy championships in 1979, 1983, 1984, 1987 and 1996. Six sailors have received College Sailor of the Year recognition, Jonathan Wright 1971, Alex Smigelski 1979, Morgan Reeser, 1983 and 1984, Jay Renehan 1985, William Hardesty III, 1998. The school has had 32 All American Skippers, 11 Honorable mention skippers, and 10 All American crews.

The USMMA Men's Basketball team was dominant in the Skyline Conference throughout for nearly a decade starting in 1994 and ending when the 2003 team. The four graduating seniors from 2003 compiled the most wins in USMMA Men's Basketball history which included 3 wins in the NCAA tournament, a mark that still stands as a record today. A member of that class also holds the USMMA record and is 3rd all-time in NCAA division III history for drawing the most offensive fouls over a 4 year span. Many have said that if he would have played in the NCAA Tournament Sweet Sixteen game against Clark University that special group may have gone on to win the National Championship.
