= Coast Guard Bears =

Intercollegiate sports teams

- University: United States Coast Guard Academy
- Nickname: Bears
- NCAA: Division III
- Conference: NEWMAC (primary); NEISA
- Athletic director: Dan Rose, Ed.D.
- Location: New London, Connecticut
- Varsity teams: 26
- Football stadium: Cadet Memorial Field
- Basketball arena: Roland Hall
- Baseball stadium: Nitchman Field
- Soccer/Track stadium: Nitchman Field
- Colors: Blue and orange
- Mascot: Objee
- Fight song: "Semper Paratus"
- Website: coastguardathletics.com
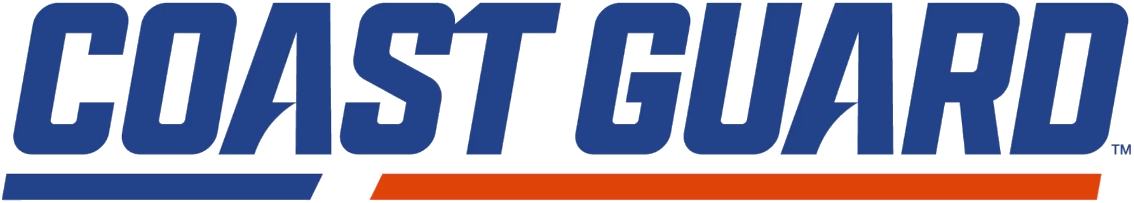

The United States Coast Guard Academy's intercollegiate sports teams are called the Bears. They compete in NCAA Division III as members of the New England Women's and Men's Athletic Conference. Through the 2016 season, the Bears played football in the New England Football Conference, but after that season moved their football program into the NEWMAC, which started sponsoring the sport in 2017.

The school fields 26 varsity teams.

== Origin of the name ==
The academy nickname is the Bears, after the USRC Bear, which made a dramatic rescue in Alaska in 1897, shortly after the opening of the academy.

In 1926, then-Cadet Stephen Evans (a future superintendent of the academy) brought a live bear to the academy and named it Objee for "Objectionable Presence." The tradition of keeping a live bear as the mascot was continued until the City of New London petitioned for its removal in 1984.

== Facilities ==
The athletic facilities have been undergoing major upgrades since 2004, when the state-of-the-art FieldTurf synthetic surface was installed at Cadet Memorial Field (home of the football and lacrosse teams).

In 2019, a new field design and scoreboard were installed on Cadet Memorial Field.

== Rivalries ==
The Bears play annually for the Secretaries' Cup, a football rivalry game against the Mariners of the United States Merchant Marine Academy. Since 2017, the game has been broadcast on ESPN streaming platforms in conjunction with the company's salute to service over Veteran's Day Weekend.

The Bears' longest-standing football rivalry is with the Norwich University Cadets, a private military college in Northfield, Vermont. Since 1930, the schools have played for "The Mug," with a brief break in the series having taken place between 2005 and 2017, when the schools were in different conferences and were not able to schedule annual out of conference matchups.

The Bears also have an unofficial rivalry with neighboring Connecticut College. The rivalry is most evident during the Coast Guard–Connecticut College biannual club hockey game which draws large numbers of spectators from both schools.

== Varsity teams ==
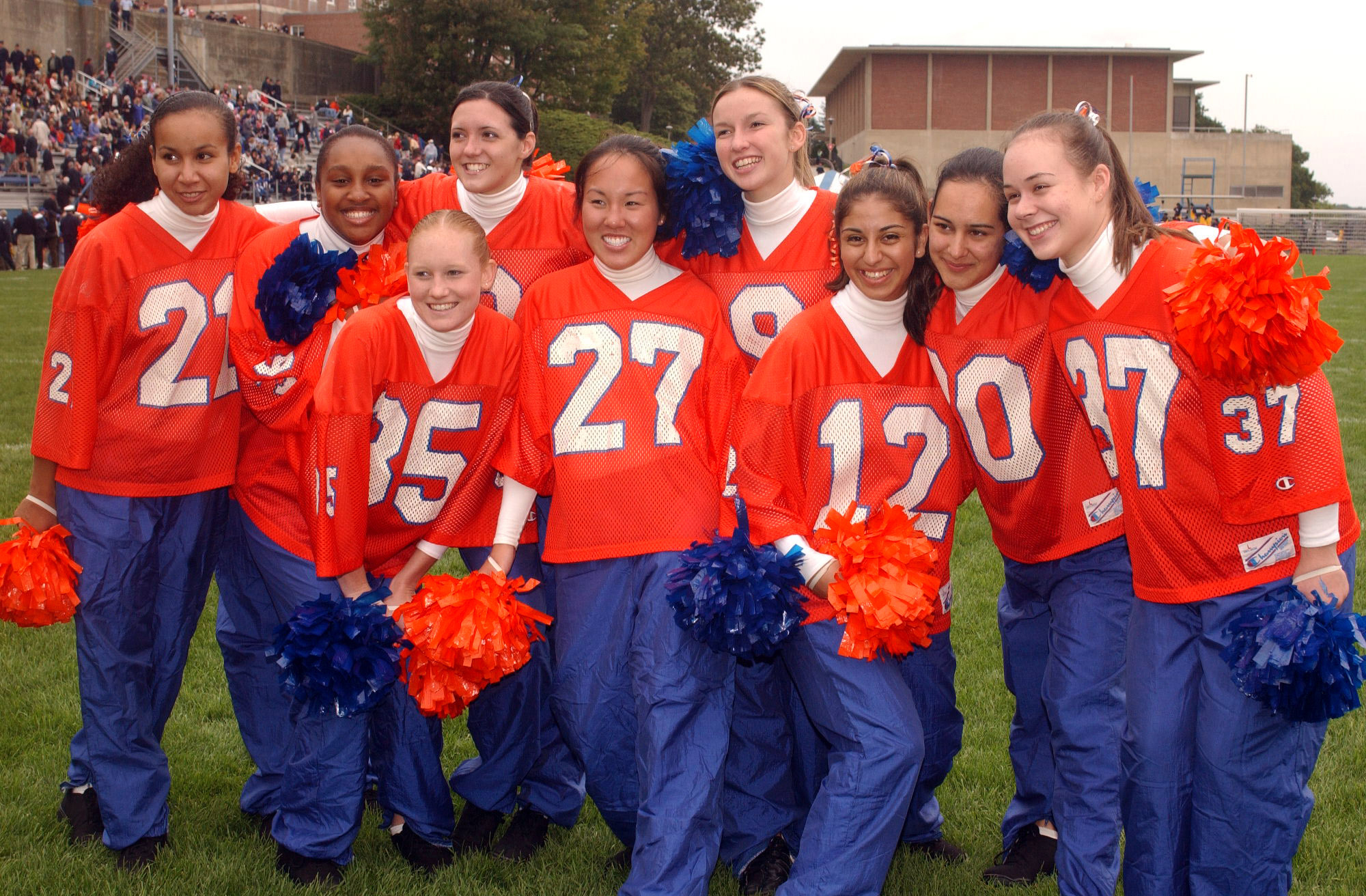
Coast Guard Academy cheerleaders at the Homecoming Game, 2003

Men's sports	Women's sports
Basketball	Basketball
Soccer	Soccer
Lacrosse	Lacrosse
Cross Country	Cross Country
Swimming & Diving	Swimming & Diving
Track & Field	Track & Field
Baseball	Softball
Football	Volleyball
Rowing	Rowing
Pistol	Pistol
Sailing	Sailing
Wrestling	
Tennis	

=== Cross Country ===
The Coast Guard Bears men's and women's cross country teams are coached by RIC alumni Coach Gregory Ahnrud, who replaced former XC head coach and current indoor and outdoor track and field Head Coach Ethan Brown. In 2024, the men's and women's teams finished in the top ten at the DIII New England cross country championships at Harkness Memorial Park for the first time in modern program history.

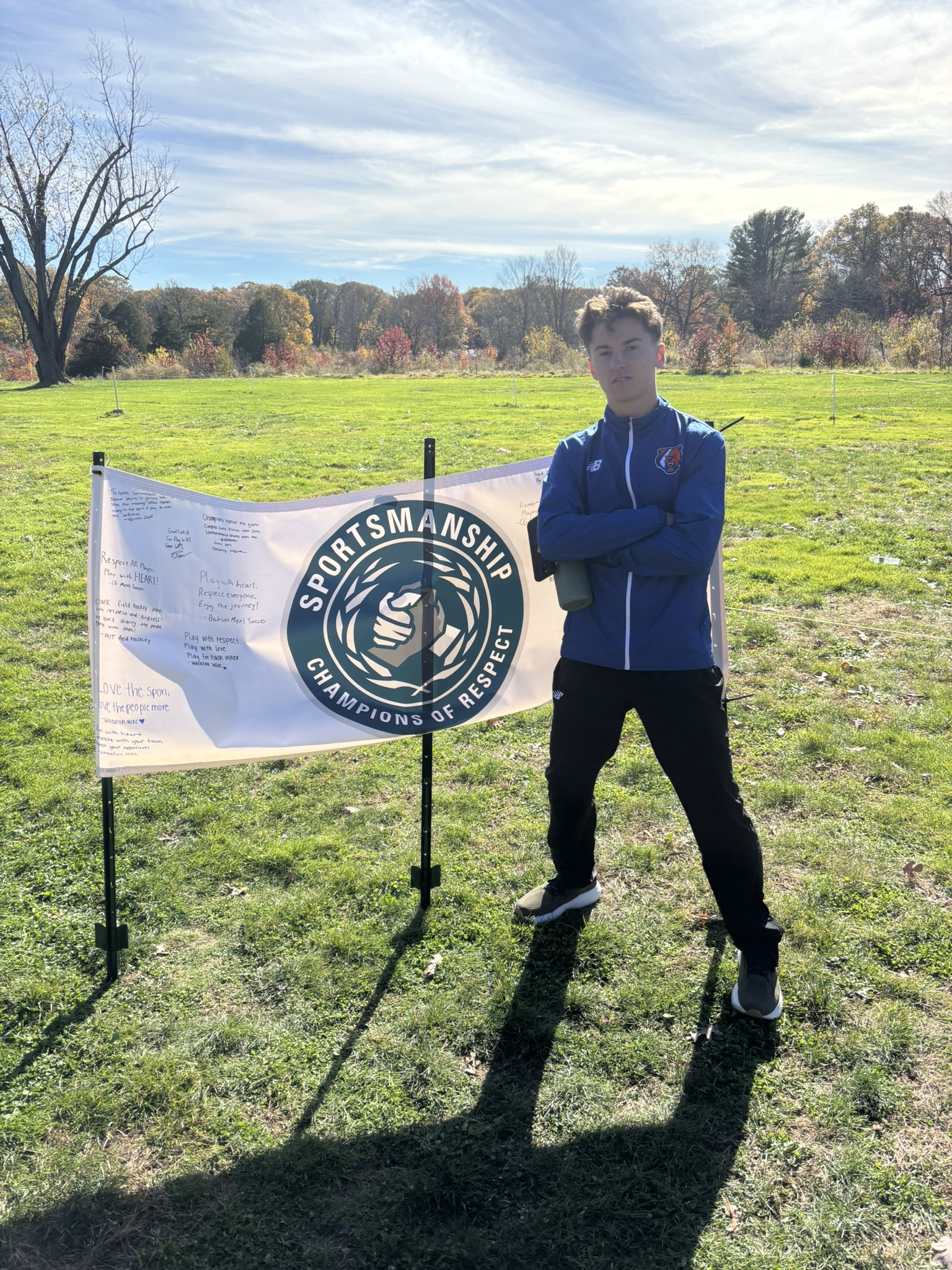
Grant Kellenberger posing with the NEWMAC sportsmanship poster

The men's cross country team can often be found running through New London, CT, frequenting Colman Street, Connecticut Avenue, and Jefferson Street. In 2024, Cadet Grant Kellenberger was named a member of the NEWMAC Fall Sportsmanship Team. In 2025 Cadet Paul Hobbs became the first member of the men's team to qualify for the NCAA DIII National Championships in over a decade.

=== Football ===
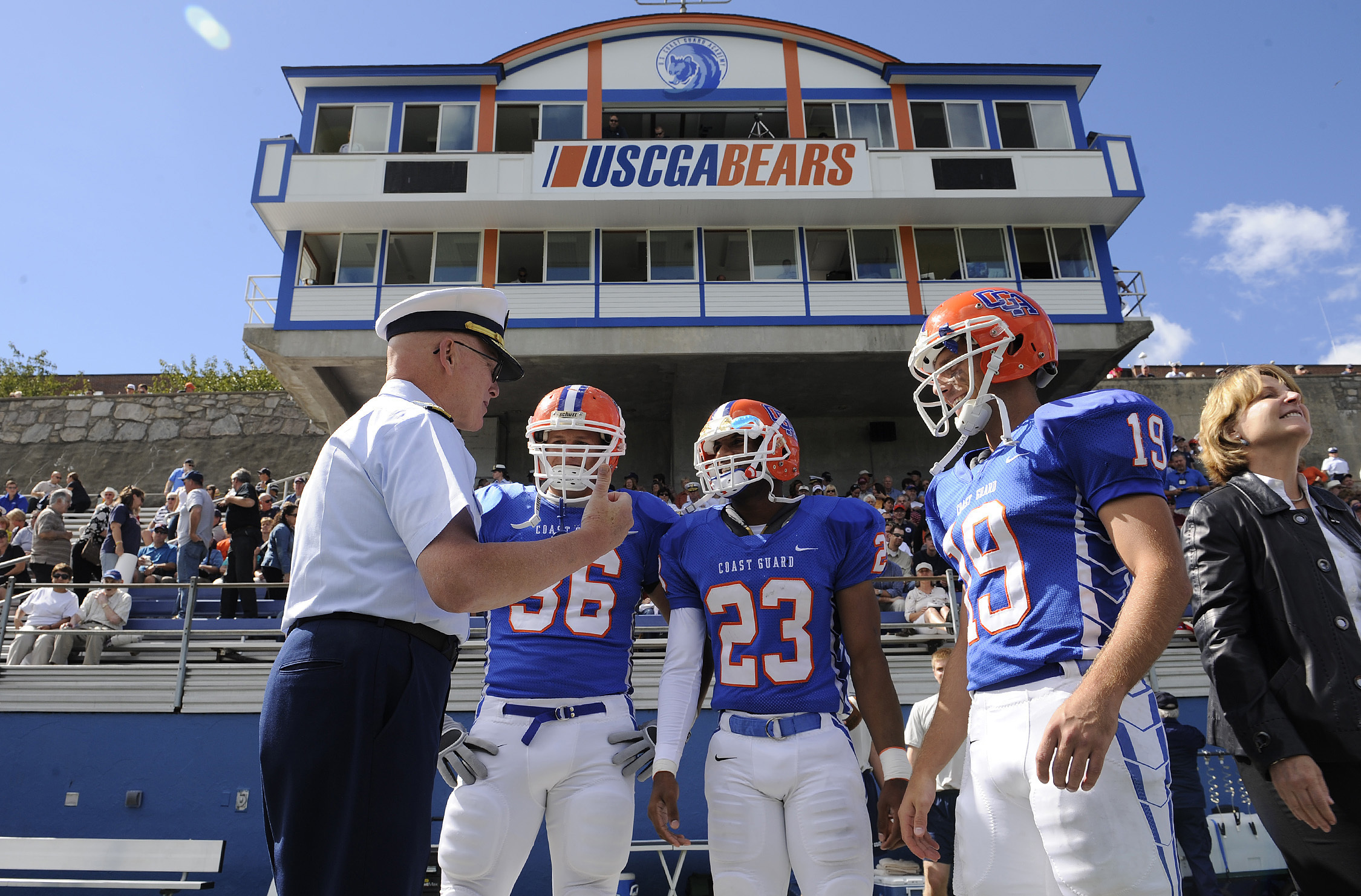
U.S. Coast Guard Commandant Adm. Robert J. Papp Jr. talks with players of the Bears football team before a game on Saturday, September 11, 2010, at the Coast Guard Academy in New London, Connecticut

The 1951 team under head coach Nels Nitchman was the first undefeated team at the Coast Guard Academy. They won six games and tied Northeastern University who also was undefeated. In 1963, the Coast Guard Academy's football team had a perfect season, making it eligible for that year's Tangerine Bowl.

Otto Graham, the Pro Football Hall of Famer, was head coach and then athletic director at Coast Guard from 1959 to 1985. His service was interrupted by his three seasons (1966–68) as Head Coach and General Manager of the Washington Redskins, who then replaced him with Vince Lombardi.

=== Sailing ===
The academy boasts a strong sailing tradition and maintains a fleet of over 150 vessels to support the offshore and dinghy teams, in addition to the summer sail training programs.

In 2007, a USCGA cadet, then a freshman sailor from the class of 2011, Krysta Rohde, was featured in the "Faces in the Crowd" section of the 27 December edition of Sports Illustrated. That year Rohde gained recognition by being the first academy cadet and second freshman ever to win the ICSA Women's Singlehanded National Championship.

In 2016, the Bears would win the Sperry Women's National Championship, the school's first team championship in the sport.

== Club sports ==
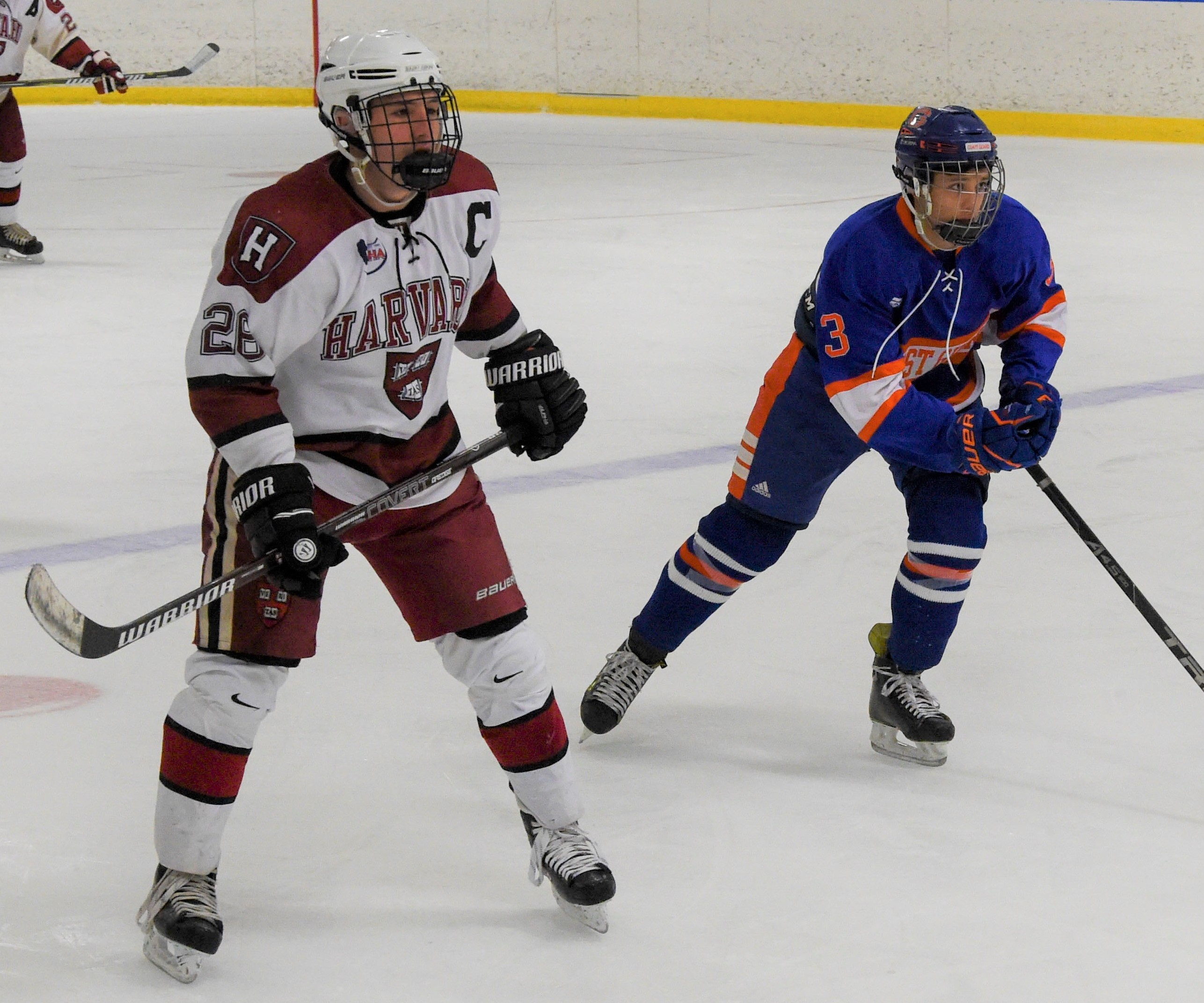
An American Collegiate Hockey Association game between Harvard and Coast Guard in 2019

The Coast Guard Academy has many club sports such as men's and women's rugby, water polo, men's ice hockey and triathlon. The academy's boxing team was disbanded in 2018 due to safety concerns.

=== Rugby ===
In 2006, the men's rugby club won the Division II National Championship at Stanford, California, after defeating the University of Northern Colorado.

=== Men's Water Polo ===
In 2008, the men's water polo team took fourth place at the Collegiate Water Polo Association Division III Club Championships at Villanova University. Additionally, the squad captured the North Atlantic Crown to snag its inaugural postseason berth.

In 2012, the team made it into the field as the North Atlantic Division runner-up. In the same year, the Bears won sixth at Middlebury College in the Collegiate Water Polo Association Division III Club Championships.

In 2017, the team finished seventh in the nation at the Collegiate Water Polo Association Division III Club Championships after ending their season with an 11–1 record. In that season, the Bears held most of their practices in the Thames River due to a shortage of pool space at the academy.

In 2018, the team placed fifth in the nation at the Collegiate Water Polo Association Division III Club Championships at Wesleyan University after winning the Colonial Division Championships with a 12–0 record.

In 2019, the team set multiple club records. First, the team finished third in the nation at the Collegiate Water Polo Association Division III Club Championships at Villanova University, their best finish in club history. Additionally, the Bears won the Colonial Division Championships after a record-breaking 13–0 regular season record.

In 2021, the team placed first in the Colonial Division in a short 4-game season. They would finish undefeated at 4–0.
