= 1972 Tampa Spartans football team =

American college football season

1972 Tampa Spartans football

Tangerine Bowl champion

Tangerine Bowl, W 21–18 vs. Kent State
- Conference: Independent
- Record: 10–2
- Head coach: Earle Bruce (1st season)
- Home stadium: Tampa Stadium

1972 NCAA College Division independents football records
| | Conf. | | | Overall |
| Team | W | L | T | W | | L | | T |
|---|---|---|---|---|---|---|---|---|
| No. 4 Ashland | | – | | 11 | – | 0 | – | 0 |
| Bridgeport | | – | | 11 | – | 0 | – | 0 |
| No. 1 Delaware | | – | | 10 | – | 0 | – | 0 |
| No. 5 Tennessee State | | – | | 11 | – | 1 | – | 0 |
| Colorado College | | – | | 8 | – | 1 | – | 0 |
| Tampa | | – | | 10 | – | 2 | – | 0 |
| Trinity (TX) | | – | | 8 | – | 2 | – | 0 |
| Western Carolina | | – | | 7 | – | 2 | – | 1 |
| Hawaii | | – | | 8 | – | 3 | – | 0 |
| Indiana State | | – | | 7 | – | 3 | – | 0 |
| Northeastern | | – | | 6 | – | 2 | – | 0 |
| Bucknell | | – | | 6 | – | 3 | – | 0 |
| Cortland | | – | | 6 | – | 3 | – | 0 |
| San Diego | | – | | 6 | – | 3 | – | 1 |
| Arkansas–Pine Bluff | | – | | 4 | – | 2 | – | 1 |
| Eastern Michigan | | – | | 6 | – | 4 | – | 0 |
| Milwaukee | | – | | 6 | – | 4 | – | 0 |
| Samford | | – | | 5 | – | 3 | – | 2 |
| Ball State | | – | | 5 | – | 4 | – | 1 |
| Lake Forest | | – | | 4 | – | 3 | – | 1 |
| Nevada | | – | | 6 | – | 5 | – | 0 |
| Central Michigan | | – | | 5 | – | 5 | – | 1 |
| Rose-Hulman | | – | | 5 | – | 5 | – | 0 |
| Santa Clara | | – | | 4 | – | 4 | – | 1 |
| Akron | | – | | 3 | – | 4 | – | 2 |
| St. Norbert | | – | | 4 | – | 5 | – | 0 |
| Saint Mary's | | – | | 3 | – | 4 | – | 0 |
| Kentucky State | | – | | 4 | – | 6 | – | 0 |
| Drexel | | – | | 3 | – | 6 | – | 0 |
| Northeast Louisiana | | – | | 3 | – | 7 | – | 0 |
| Portland State | | – | | 3 | – | 8 | – | 0 |
| Wayne State (MI) | | – | | 2 | – | 5 | – | 1 |
| Boston University | | – | | 2 | – | 8 | – | 0 |
| Northern Michigan | | – | | 2 | – | 8 | – | 0 |
| Saint Peter's | | – | | 2 | – | 8 | – | 0 |
| Chattanooga | | – | | 2 | – | 9 | – | 0 |
| Southern Illinois | | – | | 1 | – | 8 | – | 1 |
| Eastern Illinois | | – | | 1 | – | 9 | – | 0 |
| Madison | | – | | 0 | – | 4 | – | 1 |
| UNLV | | – | | 1 | – | 10 | – | 0 |
Rankings from AP small college poll

The 1972 Tampa Spartans football team represented the University of Tampa in the 1972 NCAA College Division football season. It was the Spartans' 36th season and they competed as an NCAA College Division independent. The team was led by head coach Earle Bruce, in his first and only year, and played their home games at Tampa Stadium in Tampa, Florida. They finished with a record of ten wins and two losses (10–2) and with a victory in the Tangerine Bowl over Kent State, which featured future Pro Football Hall of Fame linebacker Jack Lambert and future Missouri coach Gary Pinkel (future Alabama coach Nick Saban was injured earlier in the Golden Flashes' season and did not play in the bowl game).

Bruce was hired on February 2, 1972, to serve as the replacement for Bill Fulcher who resigned to become the head coach at Georgia Tech. Bruce departed following the season to become head coach at Iowa State after Johnny Majors was named coach at Pittsburgh.

The Spartans' notable players included John Matuszak, who was selected first overall by the Houston Oilers in the 1973 NFL draft and later won two Super Bowls with the Oakland Raiders; Freddie Solomon, a receiver on two Super Bowl champion teams with the San Francisco 49ers in the 1980s; and Paul Orndorff, who went on to stardom in the World Wrestling Federation as "Mr. Wonderful".

== Schedule ==
| Date | Time | Opponent | Site | Result | Attendance | Source |
|---|---|---|---|---|---|---|
| September 9 | 8:11 p.m. | Toledo | Tampa Stadium; Tampa, FL | W 21–0 | 23,806 | |
| September 16 | 1:30 p.m. | at Northern Michigan | Memorial Stadium; Marquette, MI | W 34–21 | 6,500 | |
| September 22 | 8:04 p.m. | Eastern Michigan | Tampa Stadium; Tampa, FL | W 42–0 | 14,407 | |
| September 30 | 2:33 p.m. | at Kansas State | KSU Stadium; Manhattan, KS | L 7–31 | 35,000 | |
| October 7 | 8:00 p.m. | Louisville | Tampa Stadium; Tampa, FL | L 14–17 | 19,437 | |
| October 14 | 8:05 p.m. | Southern Illinois | Tampa Stadium; Tampa, FL | W 44–0 | 14,125 | |
| October 21 | 8:02 p.m. | No. 9 Drake | Tampa Stadium; Tampa, FL | W 24–7 | 15,240 | |
| November 4 | 8:00 p.m. | Florida A&M | Tampa Stadium; Tampa, FL | W 28–9 | 31,350 | |
| November 11 | 7:02 p.m. | Miami (FL) | Tampa Stadium; Tampa, FL | W 7–0 | 22,525 | |
| November 18 | 8:00 p.m. | Bowling Green | Tampa Stadium; Tampa, FL | W 29–22 | 15,111 | |
| November 25 | 8:03 p.m. | Vanderbilt | Tampa Stadium; Tampa, FL | W 30–7 | 11,831 | |
| December 29 | | vs. Kent State | Tangerine Bowl; Orlando, FL (Tangerine Bowl) | W 21–18 | 20,062 | |
Rankings from AP Poll released prior to the game; All times are in Eastern time
