= 1972 Tangerine Bowl =

American college football game

Kent State Golden Flashes	Tampa Spartans
(6–4–1)	(9–2)
MAC	Independent
18	21
Head coach: Don James	Head coach: Earle Bruce
	1	2	3	4	Total
Kent State	0	0	6	12	18
Tampa	14	7	0	0	21
- Date: December 29, 1972
- Season: 1972
- Stadium: Tangerine Bowl
- Location: Orlando, Florida
- MVP: Freddie Solomon, Tampa (back); Jack Lambert, Kent State (lineman)
- Favorite: Tampa by 14
- Attendance: 20,062

The 1972 Tangerine Bowl, part of the 1972 bowl game season, took place on December 29, 1972, at the Tangerine Bowl stadium in Orlando, Florida. The competing teams were the Tampa Spartans, that competed as a College Division Independent, and the Kent State Golden Flashes, that competed as a member of the Mid-American Conference (MAC). In the game, Tampa took a 21–0 halftime lead, and then held off a Golden Flashes comeback to win 21–18.

The game featured two eventual College Football Hall of Fame coaches, Earle Bruce at Tampa and Don James at Kent State. Other players of note that played in the game included eventual Alabama head coach Nick Saban, Missouri head coach Gary Pinkel and Pro Football Hall of Fame linebacker Jack Lambert for Kent State and eventual number one NFL Draft pick John Matuszak for Tampa. Tampa's Paul Orndorff would go on to have a successful professional wrestling career.

== Teams ==
=== Tampa ===
The Spartans entered their game against Bowling Green with an overall record of seven wins and two losses (7–2), and it was speculated the winner of the game would be invited to compete in the Tangerine Bowl. This was the case as a Falcons victory would give them the MAC championship and an automatic bid to the game thus making a rematch against the Spartans unlikely. Tampa did win the game 29–22, and on November 20, they accepted a bid to play in the Tangerine Bowl. The appearance marked the first for the Spartans in a National Collegiate Athletic Association (NCAA) sanctioned bowl game and their first postseason appearance since their victory in the 1954 Cigar Bowl.

=== Kent State ===
The Golden Flashes entered their game against Toledo with an overall record of five wins, four losses and one tie (5–4–1). With a victory over the Rockets, Kent State won their first all-time MAC Championship and secured the league's automatic bid to the Tangerine Bowl.

== Game summary ==
The 1972 edition of the Tangerine Bowl kicked off at 8:00 p.m. before what was the largest crowd to date for the game. The Spartans took a 14–0 first quarter lead on a pair of Buddy Carter touchdown passes to Paul Orndorff. The first was set up after Gerald Tinker fumbled a punt at the Flashes' 15-yard line that was recovered by Terry Grantham. On the next play, Tampa led 7–0 with Orndorff's 15-yard touchdown reception. Later in the quarter, the second Spartans touchdown was set up by a Tommy Thomas interception return of a Greg Kokal pass to the Kent 38-yard line. Two plays later, Tampa led 14–0 with Orndorff's 35-yard touchdown reception. Tampa's final touchdown drive of the night was again set up by a Kent turnover. For the second time, Kokal threw an interception, and on the drive that followed Freddie Solomon gained 60 yards on five carries that included the final two for a touchdown and a 21–0 halftime lead.

Kent responded in the third quarter with their first touchdown on a 76-yard Kokal pass to Tinker, and after a missed extra point the score was 21–6. A pair of fourth-quarter touchdowns on a ten-yard Kokal pass to Dooner and on a 78-yard Renard Harmon punt return made the final score 21–18. For his performance of 103 yards on 14 carries and a touchdown, Freddie Solomon was named outstanding back of the game, along with Kent State's Jack Lambert who was named outstanding lineman.

== Scoring summary ==
Scoring summary

Quarter	Time	Drive			Team	Scoring information	Score	
Quarter	Time	Plays	Yards	TOP	Team	Scoring information	Kent State	Tampa
1	12:47	1	15		Tampa	Paul Orndorff 15-yard touchdown reception from Buddy Carter, Bob Cooper kick good	0	7
1	7:31	2	38		Tampa	Paul Orndorff 35-yard touchdown reception from Buddy Carter, Bob Cooper kick good	0	14
2	6:55	7	89		Tampa	Freddie Solomon 3-yard touchdown run, Bob Cooper kick good	0	21
3					Kent State	Gerald Tinker 76-yard touchdown reception from Greg Kokal, Herb Page kick wide	6	21
4	8:03				Kent State	Kenneth Dooner 10-yard touchdown reception from Greg Kokal, 2-point run failed	12	21
4	1:41				Kent State	Bernard Harmon 78-yard punt return, Herb Page kick no good	18	21
"TOP" = time of possession. For other American football terms, see Glossary of American football.							18	21
