= Tampa Spartans football =

Football program that represented the University of Tampa

- First season: 1933
- Last season: 1974; 52 years ago
- Location: Tampa, Florida
- Stadium: Plant Field (1933–1936); Phillips Field (1937–1966); Tampa Stadium (1967–1974)
- Conference: NAIA (1933–1970); NCAA D-I Ind. (1971–1974)
- Colors: Black, red, and gold
- All-time record: 201–160–12 (.555)
- Bowl record: 3–0 (1.000)

The Tampa Spartans football program was an intercollegiate American football team for the University of Tampa (UT) located in Tampa, Florida, that began play in 1933. The program competed against other small college programs in the forerunner of today's NCAA Division II for almost forty years before moving to the top level of NCAA Division I as an independent in 1971. Successfully competing against top college programs as a much smaller school put an enormous strain on the university's finances, and the school decided to discontinue football after the 1974 season.

== History ==
=== Beginnings of the program ===
==== Nickname and colors ====
When the University of Tampa was founded as Tampa Junior College in 1931, St. Petersburg Junior College was expected to be their top athletic rival. Since St. Pete JC's mascot was the Trojans, founding Tampa Junior College president Frederic H. Spaulding decided that his school's mascot would be the Spartans in reference to the Trojan War between Troy and Sparta in Homer's the Iliad. The classically inspired cross-bay rivalry never developed. Tampa Junior College moved to its current location in the former Tampa Bay Hotel and became the University of Tampa in 1933, and it soon established a football program that would compete against other small southern four-year colleges. Meanwhile, St. Petersburg Junior College deemphasized athletics and, several years later, changed its mascot to the Titans.

Most of the University of Tampa's early students were from Tampa, and most of its early athletes were graduates of the first two public high schools in the area, Hillsborough and Plant. Hillsborough's colors are red and black and Plant's colors are gold and black, so Nash Higgins, "Tampa U"'s first football coach, decided that the Spartans would combine the colors and wear red, gold, and black.

==== Small college football ====
The University of Tampa Spartans football program kicked off on October 12, 1933, with a 28–0 win over Bowdon College in LaGrange, Georgia. They played their first home game a week later at Plant Field, which they used for their first three seasons. However, the Spartans shared Plant Field with many other community events, so the school built Phillips Field on nearby land donated by local businessman I. W. Phillips. The Spartans moved to the new facility for the 1937 season and would call it home for three decades.

For over 30 years, the Spartans competed in the National Association of Intercollegiate Athletics (NAIA) and its forerunners, mostly against other small colleges in the south. Tampa U usually fielded competitive teams and won two Cigar Bowls, a bowl game for NAIA programs played in Tampa. The Spartans scheduled eleven games against the Florida State Seminoles in the 1940s and 1950s soon after FSU founded its football program and was playing in the lower division of college football. Tampa went 2–9 against the Seminoles, with the last meeting coming in 1959. The UT football program occasionally scheduled games against NCAA Division I teams in its early years including the University of Florida Gators, whom they played on five occasions in the 1930s and 1940s but never defeated.

=== Move to Division I ===
In 1963, head coach Fred Pancoast encouraged the university to move its football program to the top tier of college football, NCAA Division I, but the university leadership did not feel that the school could support the move at the time, and Pancoast left to become an assistant with the Florida Gators. However, after the program moved its home field from Phillips Field to newly-constructed Tampa Stadium in 1967, the school decided to compete as an independent at the Division I program beginning with the 1971 season.

Tampa U. quickly became competitive at the highest level of college football. The Spartans earned wins over established programs such as Ole Miss and Miami and won the 1972 Tangerine Bowl to cap a 10-2 season. They were led by several stars who went on to play professional football, including Leon McQuay, Freddie Solomon, Noah Jackson, and John Matuszak, who was the first overall pick in the 1973 NFL draft.

=== Ending the program ===
Although the Spartans enjoyed success on the field against Division I opponents from much larger universities, the University of Tampa had an enrollment of about 1,300 in the early 1970s and the football program was putting an increasing financial strain on the school's limited resources. In early 1975, university president B.D. Owens and the UT finance committee surprised the university community by proposing that the school drop football due to unsustainable expenses. A financial report released by the committee revealed that the football program had run a deficit of almost $200,000 in 1974 ($1,017,161 today) and that the school had borrowed over $750,000 ($4,517,393 today) from its endowment to subsidize the sport since its move to Division I. Owens also expressed concern that Tampa's new NFL franchise would erode attendance at Spartans' games, potentially pushing the entire university into bankruptcy. (The Tampa Bay Buccaneers were organized in 1974 and took the field in 1976.) To the disappointment of Spartan players and coaches and the Tampa community in general, the UT Board of Trustees voted on February 20, 1975, to immediately end the football program, cancelling the already scheduled 1975 season.

The Spartans played their last game on November 11, 1974, a 35–10 win over Florida A&M, though no one knew at the time that it would be their final contest. The football program finished with an all-time record of 201–160–12.

== Stadiums ==
- Plant Field had been built beside the Tampa Bay Hotel by Henry B. Plant in the 1890s. The stadium grandstand was large and the playing field was large enough to host a wide variety of sports and events, from auto racing to baseball and more. The hotel closed in 1930 and the University of Tampa took over the facilities in 1933. Subsequently, the Tampa Spartans' sports programs (including the football team) began using Plant Field as their home field the same year. However, the venue was shared with many other local events and activities, so the Spartans only used Plant Field for three seasons. In the 1970s, the university took ownership of Plant Field and divided up the land for use as several academic buildings and sports facilities, including smaller stadiums for the school's baseball and track programs. The last portion of the original grandstand was demolished in 2003.
- Phillips Field opened across the street from the University of Tampa on the west bank of the Hillsborough River on October 4, 1937. It was built on land donated by local businessman I. W. Phillips for the purpose, and the university named it in his honor. Phillips Field had wooden seating in a large horseshoe and seated a maximum of 20,000 with additional temporary seating. The Spartans used the stadium from 1937 until the first few games of the 1967 football season. Phillips Field was demolished in the early 1970s and is now the site of Tampa Preparatory School

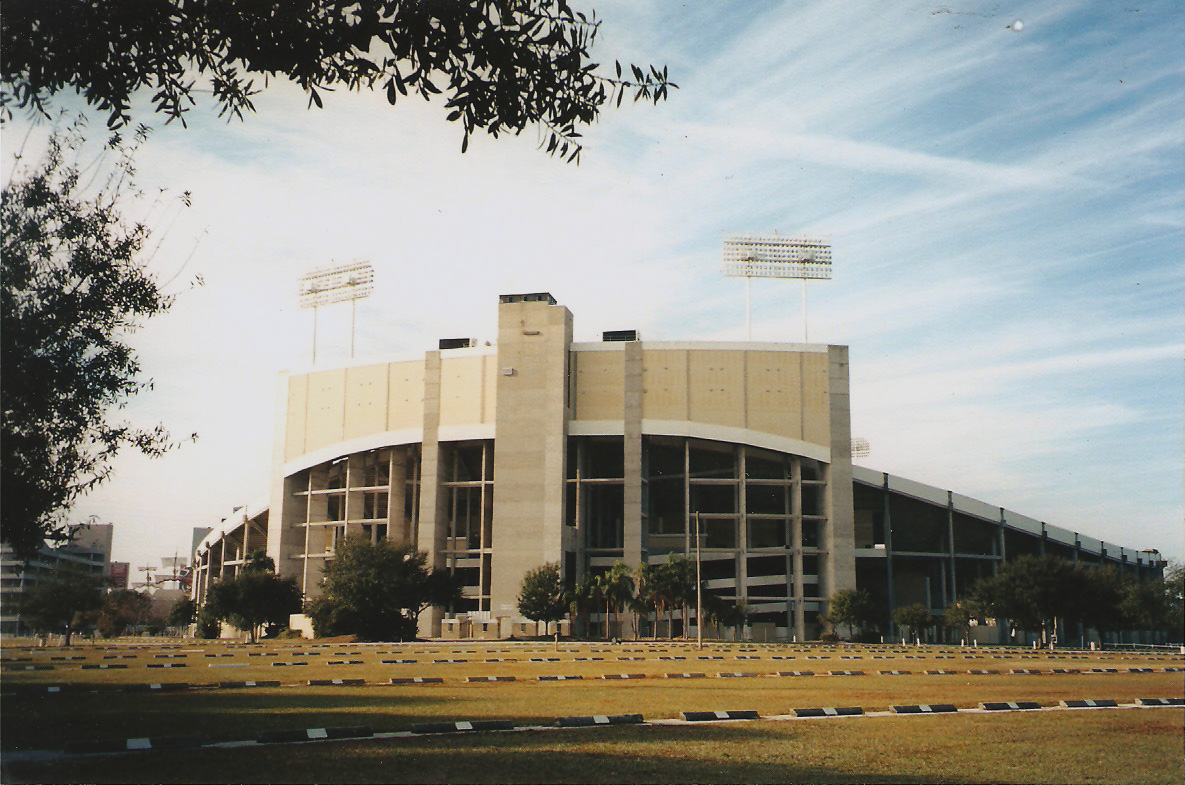
Tampa Stadium

- Tampa Stadium was built in 1967, and the first event at the brand-new venue was a game between the Tampa Spartans and the No.3 Tennessee Volunteers. The Spartans lost that game 38-0, but they would later enjoy much success on their last home field, whose greater capacity made possible their move to the top level of college football. Tampa Stadium was built with an eye to attract an National Football League expansion team, and the awarding of the future Tampa Bay Buccaneers in 1974 was a major factor in the University of Tampa deciding to end its football program before the 1975 season.

== Coaches ==
- Nash Higgins was the first head coach at the University of Tampa. He coached the team from 1933 to 1940 to a record of 36–39–5.
- Melvin Vines was head coach (1942 season) after which the school canceled football because of World War II. Vines then became a successful high school coach in Alabama.
- Frank Sinkwich, who had won the 1942 Heisman Trophy playing for the Georgia Bulldogs, coached two seasons at University of Tampa to a record of 12–7–1. He is a member of the College Football Hall of Fame as a player.
- Marcelino "Chelo" Huerta was the head coach from 1952 to 1961. Huerta had been a star player with the Florida Gators and was 28 years old when promoted to be the Spartan's head coach, making him the youngest head coach / athletic director in college sports at the time. The Spartans when 63-37-2 in his ten seasons at the school, and Huerta was later enshrined in the College Football Hall of Fame as a coach.
- Fred Pancoast was a four-year starter at safety for the Spartans from 1949 to 1952 and became the Spartans' head coach in 1962. In two seasons as a coach, his record was 7–9. He left to become the offensive coordinator for the Florida Gators.
- Sam Bailey coached the Spartans from 1964 to 1967. He had earlier coached the basketball and baseball teams at the University of Tampa. As a football coach his record was 16–20. Today, the baseball field at the university is known as Sam Bailey Field.
- Fran Curci coached the Spartans from 1968 to 1970 to a 25–6 record. In 1970, Curci led Tampa U to a 10–1 season that included a road win over the Miami Hurricanes. After the season, Curci accepted an offer to become the head coach at Miami. He would later become the first coach of the Tampa Bay Storm arena football team.
- Bill Fulcher coached the Spartans for one season in 1971, leading them to a 6–5 record. Fulcher then left for Georgia Tech, succeeding Bud Carson.
- Earle Bruce also only coached Tampa U. for one season. In 1972, he led the Spartans to a 10–2 record that concluded with the only major bowl appearance in program history, a 21-18 win over Kent State in the 1972 Tangerine Bowl. Bruce was then hired by Iowa State to succeed Johnny Majors, who had been named coach at Pittsburgh.
- Dennis Fryzel was the final coach of the University of Tampa football team. He coached for two seasons going 8–3 in 1973 and then 6-5 in 1974, the team's final season.

== Notable former players ==
- Freddie Solomon, known as ‘Fabulous Freddie’ finished his University of Tampa career with 5,803 total yards and a then quarterback record of 3,299 rushing yards along with 39 touchdowns. In the 1974 season, he rushed for a then NCAA quarterback record 1,300 yards and 19 touchdowns to go along with it. That season, he finished 12th in Heisman voting. In 1975, Solomon was selected in the second round by the Miami Dolphins. During his career he played wide receiver, running back, quarterback, and returned kicks for the Dolphins and the San Francisco 49ers, winning two Super Bowls with the 49ers.
- John Matuszak was a defensive end for the Tampa Spartans and an All-American in 1972. He was selected first overall in the 1973 NFL draft by the Houston Oilers. He played 123 career games with Houston, Kansas City, and Oakland. As an actor, Matuszak antagonized opposite Ringo Starr in the comedy Caveman and played "Sloth" in the 1985 comedy The Goonies.
- Darryl Carlton was an offensive tackle at University of Tampa. He was drafted in the first round, twenty-third overall to the Miami Dolphins. He played a total of 71 NFL games.
- Noah Jackson was a three-year started at defensive tackle before leaving before his senior seasons to play in the Canadian Football League where he converted to offensive tackle and was an all star. In 1974, he was drafted in the seventh round by the Baltimore Colts and in 1975 he was named to the NFL All-Rookie team. He played a total of 131 NFL games.
- Leon McQuay, a star running back at Blake High School in Tampa, was the first black athlete to receive a scholarship at the University of Tampa. In his three seasons at UT, he was twice named a small college All-American. In 1971, he skipped his senior year to sign and play in the Canadian Football League where he was an award winning all star for the Toronto Argonauts. He is remembered for his untimely fumble in the 59th Grey Cup championship game. He was drafted in the fifth round by the NFL's New York Giants in the 1973 NFL draft and appeared in 30 NFL games for the Giants, the New England Patriots, and the New Orleans Saints.
- Paul Orndorff, was a fullback at the University of Tampa who was drafted in the twelfth round by the New Orleans Saints. He later became famous as a professional wrestler known by the nickname, ‘Mr. Wonderful’.

Other notable players from the University of Tampa to play professional football are quarterback Jim Del Gaizo, linebacker Ted Greene, tight end M.L. Harris, defensive back J.C. Wilson, linebacker Mike Woods.

== Bowl game appearances ==
Tampa participated in three bowl games, garnering a 3–0 record.

Season	Date	Bowl	Opponent	Result	Coach
1952	December 13, 1952	Cigar Bowl	Lenoir–Rhyne	W 21–12	Chelo Huerta
1954	December 17, 1954	Cigar Bowl	Charleston	W 21–0	Chelo Huerta
1972	December 29, 1972	Tangerine Bowl	Kent State	W 21–18	Earle Bruce
