= 1972 West Virginia Mountaineers football team =

American college football season

1972 West Virginia Mountaineers football

Peach Bowl, L 13–49 vs. NC State
- Conference: Independent
- Record: 8–4
- Head coach: Bobby Bowden (3rd season)
- Home stadium: Mountaineer Field

1972 NCAA University Division independents football records
	Conf.			Overall
Team	W	L	T	W		L		T
No. 10 Penn State		–		10	–	2	–	0
No. 14 Notre Dame		–		8	–	3	–	0
Utah State		–		8	–	3	–	0
West Virginia		–		8	–	4	–	0
Florida State		–		7	–	4	–	0
Northern Illinois		–		7	–	4	–	0
Rutgers		–		7	–	4	–	0
No. 20 Georgia Tech		–		7	–	4	–	1
Air Force		–		6	–	4	–	0
Army		–		6	–	4	–	0
Virginia Tech		–		6	–	4	–	1
Houston		–		6	–	4	–	1
Tulane		–		6	–	5	–	0
Temple		–		5	–	4	–	0
Colgate		–		5	–	4	–	1
Holy Cross		–		5	–	4	–	1
Syracuse		–		5	–	6	–	0
Miami (FL)		–		5	–	6	–	0
Dayton		–		4	–	6	–	1
Boston College		–		4	–	7	–	0
Navy		–		4	–	7	–	0
South Carolina		–		4	–	7	–	0
Southern Miss		–		3	–	7	–	1
Xavier		–		3	–	8	–	0
Marshall		–		2	–	8	–	0
Cincinnati		–		2	–	9	–	0
Villanova		–		2	–	9	–	0
Pittsburgh		–		1	–	10	–	0
Rankings from AP Poll

The 1972 West Virginia Mountaineers football team was an American football team that represented West Virginia University as an independent during the 1972 NCAA University Division football season. In their third season under head coach Bobby Bowden, the Mountaineers compiled an 8–4 record, including a loss to NC State in the Peach Bowl.

Senior quarterback Bernie Galiffa ranked among the leading quarterbacks in major-college football with 2,302 passing yards (4th), 209.3 yards gained per game (4th), 2,163 total yards (6th), 16 passing touchdowns (6th), and 15.6 passing yards per completion (9th).

The team played its home games at Mountaineer Field in Morgantown, West Virginia.

== Schedule ==
Date	Time	Opponent	Rank	Site	Result	Attendance	Source
September 9		Villanova		Mountaineer Field; Morgantown, WV	W 25–6	33,500	
September 16		Richmond		Mountaineer Field; Morgantown, WV	W 28–7	31,000	
September 23		at Virginia		Scott Stadium; Charlottesville, VA	W 48–10	27,000	
September 30	4:30 p.m.	at No. 19 Stanford	No. 20	Stanford Stadium; Palo Alto, CA	L 35–41	56,000	
October 7		William & Mary		Mountaineer Field; Morgantown, WV	W 49–34	28,000	
October 14		at Temple		Franklin Field; Philadelphia, PA	L 36–39	13,067	
October 21		Tulane		Mountaineer Field; Morgantown, WV	W 31–19	29,500	
October 28		No. 11 Penn State	No. T–18	Mountaineer Field; Morgantown, WV (rivalry)	L 19–28	37,000	
November 4		at Pittsburgh		Pitt Stadium; Pittsburgh, PA (rivalry)	W 38–20	40,286	
November 11		VMI		Mountaineer Field; Morgantown, WV	W 50–24	21,000	
November 18		Syracuse		Mountaineer Field; Morgantown, WV (rivalry)	W 43–12	31,500	
December 29		vs. NC State	No. 18	Atlanta Stadium; Atlanta, GA (Peach Bowl)	L 13–49	52,671	
Rankings from AP Poll released prior to the game; All times are in Eastern time

== Roster ==
1972 West Virginia Mountaineers football team roster
Players
Coaches
Offense

Pos.	#	Name	Class
WR	8	Danny Buggs	So
QB	12	Bernie Galiffa	Sr
RB	32	Kerry Marbury	Jr
WR	9	Marshall Mills	So
OG	78	Walt Bragg	Jr
OT	72	Dan Larcamp	Jr
C	57	Gerald Schultze	Sr
OG	68	Doug Stevens	So
OT	60	Bill Samuelson	Sr
TE	88	Nate Stephens	Sr
FB	44	Brian Chiles	Sr

Defense

Pos.	#	Name	Class
DE	89	Bob Sims	Sr
DT	77	Dennis Reid	Sr
DT	90	Jeff Merrow	So
DT	73	Frank Samsa	Sr
LB	63	Tom Zakowski	Sr
LB	50	Billy Joe Mantooth	Sr
LB	84	Bruce Huffman	So
DB	20	Rick Weiskircher	Sr
DB	23	Tom Geishauser	Sr
DB	18	David Morris	Sr
DB	10	Doug Charley	Sr

Special teams

Pos.	#	Name	Class
K	41	Steve Soroka	Sr

Head coach

- Bobby Bowden

Coordinators/assistant coaches

Legend

- (C) Team captain
- (S) Suspended
- (I) Ineligible
- Injured
- Redshirt
