= John Matuszak =

American football player and actor (1950–1989)

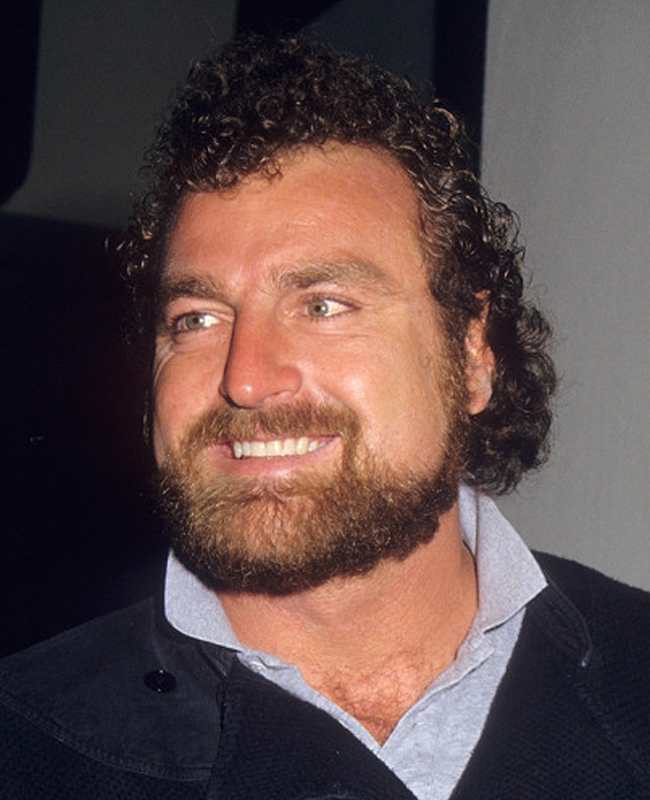
- Matuszak in 1987

No. 78, 79, 72
- Position: Defensive end

Personal information
- Born: October 25, 1950; Milwaukee, Wisconsin, U.S.
- Died: June 17, 1989 (aged 38); Burbank, California, U.S.
- Listed height: 6 ft 8 in (2.03 m)
- Listed weight: 272 lb (123 kg)

Career information
- High school: Oak Creek (Oak Creek, Wisconsin)
- College: Iowa Central (1969), Missouri (1970), Tampa (1971–1972)
- NFL draft: 1973: 1st round, 1st overall pick

Career history
- Houston Oilers (1973); Houston Texans (1974); Kansas City Chiefs (1974–1975); Washington Redskins (1976); Oakland / Los Angeles Raiders (1976–1982)

Awards and highlights
- 2× Super Bowl champion (XI, XV); Second-team All-American (1972)

Career NFL statistics
- Games played: 123
- Games started: 106
- Sacks: 48.5
- Fumble recoveries: 7
- Touchdowns: 1
- Stats at Pro Football Reference

John Daniel Matuszak (October 25, 1950 – June 17, 1989), nicknamed "Tooz", was an American professional football defensive end in the National Football League (NFL) who later became an actor.

Matuszak was selected by the Houston Oilers with the first overall pick in the 1973 NFL draft and played most of his career with the Oakland / Los Angeles Raiders until retiring after winning his second Super Bowl in 1981. Matuszak participated in the 1978 World's Strongest Man competition, placing ninth. As an actor, he starred in both films and television, appearing first as O. W. Shaddock in North Dallas Forty (1979) followed by Tonda in Caveman (1981) and the deformed Sloth in The Goonies (1985). Matuszak's autobiography, Cruisin' with the Tooz, written with Steve Delsohn, was published in 1987.

== Early life ==
John Daniel Matuszak was born on October 25, 1950, in Milwaukee, Wisconsin, to Audrey and Marvin Matuszak. He had two brothers, but both died of cystic fibrosis at young ages. One of his sisters also had the disease. The family moved from downtown Milwaukee to Oak Creek, Wisconsin, where Matuszak's classmates ridiculed him as a gawky beanpole. Their disrespect motivated Matuszak to develop into a muscular young man, and he became the Wisconsin Class A state champion in the shot put with a throw of 58 ft 11 in (17.96 m). Matuszak was always big for his age, which became an advantage as a defensive lineman in football. He attended Oak Creek High School.

After playing football at Iowa Central Community College in Iowa as a freshman, Matuszak was recruited to the University of Missouri by Dan Devine. Matuszak enrolled at Mizzou for his sophomore year of college, where he played one season of football for the Tigers as a tight end. Matuszak did not see much playing time at Mizzou because the starting tight end was an excellent blocker. With Dan Devine leaving Missouri for the Green Bay Packers that same year, Matuszak no longer had a spot on the team, and his scholarship was revoked by new coach Al Onofrio.

Matuszak subsequently transferred to the University of Tampa, where he moved back to his natural position on the defensive line and quickly became the defensive star of the Tampa Spartans football team. Matuszak was selected to the All-American Team in 1972. He was also a member of the Sigma Phi Epsilon fraternity.

In Matuszak's last college football game, Tampa defeated Kent State 21–18 in the Tangerine Bowl. Kent State's standouts included future Hall of Fame linebacker Jack Lambert and Gary Pinkel, who coached Missouri from 2001 to 2015. Another Golden Flashes senior, future seven-time national championship coach Nick Saban, suffered a season-ending injury in October. Kent State's coach was Don James, who went on to win the 1991 national championship at Washington.

By the time he became a professional athlete, Matuszak stood 6 ft 8 in (2.03 m) and weighed over 280 lb (130 kg).

== Football career ==
Matuszak was selected by the Houston Oilers with the first pick of the 1973 NFL draft. He soon ran into disagreements with head coach Sid Gillman. In addition to his contract with the Oilers, Matuszak joined the Houston Texans of the World Football League (WFL), playing a total of seven plays before a restraining order was served to him during a game, barring him from being under contract for two teams at the same time. Matuszak said that he had no plans to play in that game but requested to play after seeing 25 or so men looking for him on the sidelines. Matuszak did not know what was happening at the time and wanted to avoid confrontation. The displeased Oilers traded him to the Kansas City Chiefs for Curley Culp, another player who had threatened to jump to the WFL, and a first-round draft choice in 1975 on October 22, 1974. The trade was a steal for Houston, where Culp became a Hall of Fame performer when coach Bum Phillips moved Culp to nose tackle in the 3-4 defense in 1975. In 1976, the Chiefs traded Matuszak to the Washington Redskins, but he was released by the Redskins soon after. Later that year, Matuszak signed with the Oakland Raiders as a free agent. He helped them win two Super Bowls (XI and XV) before retiring after spending the entire 1982 season on injured reserve.

Matuszak's football career was often overshadowed by his lifestyle. In his autobiography, Matuszak stated that he used drugs and abused alcohol while playing professional football. An article written for Sports Illustrated's website in January 2005 named Matuszak one of the top five all-time "bad boys" of the NFL.

Matuszak was the only one of the first six selections of the 1973 draft to never earn first-team All-Pro honors. Offensive guard John Hannah, selected fourth by the New England Patriots, was inducted into the Hall of Fame in 1991, his first year of eligibility, following a 13-year career, while quarterback Bert Jones (Baltimore Colts), offensive tackle Jerry Sisemore (Philadelphia Eagles), tight end Charle Young (Philadelphia Eagles), and defensive tackle Dave Butz (St. Louis Cardinals) were all prominent throughout the rest of the 1970s and into the 1980s.

== Acting career ==
Matuszak became a professional actor in the 1980s, making appearances in feature films and on television, often portraying football players or gentle giants. His first major role was in the 1979 film North Dallas Forty as a football player. Matuszak appeared in the movies Caveman, The Ice Pirates, One Man Force, and One Crazy Summer, but is frequently remembered as deformed captive Sloth in The Goonies, the makeup for which took five hours to apply. Sloth wears a Raiders shirt in some scenes. Matuszak had numerous guest appearances in TV shows such as Perfect Strangers, M*A*S*H, The Dukes of Hazzard, Hunter, Silver Spoons, The A-Team, 1st & Ten, Hollywood Beat and Miami Vice.

== Death ==
On June 17, 1989, Matuszak died as a result of acute propoxyphene intoxication, an accidental overdose of the prescription drug Darvocet, according to the findings of the Los Angeles County Coroner's Office. He was 38 years old. The report also said that hypertrophic cardiomyopathy (a thickened heart) and bronchopneumonia had been contributing factors in Matuszak's death. There were also traces of cocaine found in his bloodstream.

== Filmography ==
Film
Year	Title	Role	Notes
1979	North Dallas Forty	O.W. Shaddock	
1981	Caveman	Tonda	
1984	The Ice Pirates	Killjoy	
1985	The Goonies	Lotney "Sloth" Fratelli	
1986	One Crazy Summer	Stain	
1987	P.K. and the Kid	Himself	
1989	Ghost Writer	Jake	
1989	The Princess and the Dwarf	Man of Bar	
1989	One Man Force	Jake Swan	
1990	Down the Drain	Jed Stewart	(final film role, posthumous release)

Television
Year	Title	Role	Notes
1982	M*A*S*H	Cpl. Elmo Hitalski	Season 10 Episode 18 "Promotion Commotion"
1982	Trapper John, M.D.	Joe McGurski	Season 3 Episode 23 "Cause for Concern"
1983	Matt Houston	Harold	1 episode
1984	The Dukes of Hazzard	Stoney	Season 7 Episode 5 "No More Mr. Nice Guy"
1984	Silver Spoons	Elmer	1 episode
1985	The Fall Guy	Dwayne	Season 4 Episode 13 "Semi-Catastrophe"
1985	Hollywood Beat	George Grinsky	14 episodes
1985	Command 5	Nick Kowalski	TV movie
1985	Benson	Roy	1 episode
1986	Tall Tales & Legends	Mountain Man	Episode "Darlin Clementine"
1986	Hunter	Lincoln	Season 2 Episode 18 "Death Machine"
1986	The A-Team	Davey Miller	Season 5 Episode 4 "Quarterback Sneak"
1987	Miami Vice	Lascoe	1 episode
1987	1st & Ten: The Championship	John Manzak	Season 3 Episodes 2,3,4
1988	The Dirty Dozen: The Fatal Mission	Fred Collins	TV movie
1988	Aaron's Way	Purque	2 episodes
1989	Perfect Strangers	Cobra	1 episode
1989	Superboy	Android	1 episode
