= 1982 Holiday Bowl =

Ohio State Buckeyes	BYU Cougars
(8–3)	(8–3)
Big 10	WAC
47	17
Head coach: Earle Bruce	Head coach: LaVell Edwards
AP / Coaches; 17 / 16
	1	2	3	4	Total
Ohio State	3	14	17	13	47
BYU	0	10	0	7	17
- Date: December 17, 1982
- Season: 1982
- Stadium: Jack Murphy Stadium
- Location: San Diego, California
- MVP: Offensive: Tim Spencer (Ohio State); Defensive: Garcia Lane (Ohio State)
- Halftime show: Marching bands
- Attendance: 52,533
- Payout: US$392,835 per team

United States TV coverage
- Network: ESPN; Mizlou
- Announcers: Fred White and Irv Brown (ESPN); Ray Scott and Johnny Unitas (Mizlou)

The 1982 Holiday Bowl was a college football bowl game played December 17, 1982, in San Diego, California. It was part of the 1982 NCAA Division I-A football season. It featured the 17th ranked Ohio State Buckeyes, and the unranked BYU Cougars.

== Teams ==
The game featured the Ohio State Buckeyes from the Big Ten Conference and the BYU Cougars from the Western Athletic Conference (WAC). This was the first meeting between the two teams.

=== Ohio State ===
The Buckeyes, led by fourth-year head coach Earle Bruce, started the season 2–0 and rose to no. 13 in the AP poll, but lost their next three games and fell out of the rankings. Ohio State then won its final six games, ending the regular season with a 24–14 victory over no. 13 Michigan in the Game. The Buckeyes entered the Holiday Bowl with an overall record of 8–3 and ranked no. 17 in the AP poll.

=== BYU ===
The Cougars, led by eleventh-year head coach LaVell Edwards, entered the game as the WAC champions with an overall record of 8–3. BYU's losses came against then-no. 6 Georgia, Air Force, and Utah State by a combined seven points. The Cougars ended the regular season with a 17–12 victory over Utah in the Holy War. Despite New Mexico also finishing with an identical WAC record of 7–1 (and 10–1 overall), BYU won the WAC title outright due to a 40–12 head-to-head victory over the Lobos during the season.

== Scoring summary ==
Ohio State scored first on a 47-yard field goal by Rich Spangler, giving the Buckeyes a 3–0 first quarter lead. In the second quarter, BYU quarterback Steve Young threw a 7-yard touchdown pass to Neil Balholm giving BYU a 7–3 lead. Ohio State running back Tim Spencer scored on a 61-yard touchdown run, giving the Buckeyes a 10–7 lead. Buckeye quarterback Mike Tomczak later scored on a 3-yard run making it 17–7 in favor of the Buckeyes. BYU's Kurt Gunther kicked a 39-yard field goal before halftime to make it 17–10 Ohio State.

In the third quarter, Ohio State's Vaughn Broadnax scored on a 1-yard touchdown run giving OSU a 24–10 lead. Tim Spencer added an 18-yard touchdown run, and Rich Spangler a 37-yard field goal to give Ohio State a 34–10 lead at the end of the third quarter.

In the fourth quarter, Ohio State scored a 1-yard touchdown run going up 41–10. Steve Young fired a 13-yard touchdown pass to Gordon Hudson narrowing the lead to 41–17. However, Gayle scored on a 5-yard touchdown run to respond for the Buckeyes. The Buckeyes had 329 rushing yards, 132 passing yards, while also having 196 yards on return yards, possessing the ball for 34:33 with 24 first downs. BYU had 19 rushing yards, 352 passing yards, 124 return yards, with possession time being 25:27. Both teams lost a fumble, while BYU had a pass intercepted. BYU had 9 penalties for 75 yards; Ohio State had 12 penalties for 109 yards.

== Game summary ==
1982 Holiday Bowl
No. 17 Ohio State Buckeyes vs. BYU Cougars

Quarter	1	2	3	4	Total
No. 17 Buckeyes	3	14	17	13	47
Cougars	0	10	0	7	17

at Jack Murphy Stadium, San Diego, California

- Date: December 17
- Game time: 6:00 p.m. PST
- Game attendance: 52,533
- TV announcers (ESPN): Fred White and Irv Brown / (Mizlou): Ray Scott and Johnny Unitas

Game information
First quarter
- OSU – Rick Spangler 47-yard field goal, 6:54. Buckeyes 3–0.

Second quarter

- BYU – Neil Balholm 7-yard pass from Steve Young (Kurt Gunther kick), 13:56. Cougars 7–3.
- OSU – Tim Spencer 61-yard run (Rick Spangler kick), 12:55. Buckeyes 10–7.
- OSU – Mike Tomczak 3-yard run (Rick Spangler kick), 11:14. Buckeyes 17–7.
- BYU – Kurt Gunther 39-yard field goal, 1:43. Buckeyes 17–10.

Third quarter

- OSU – Vaughn Broadnax 1-yard run (Rick Spangler kick), 8:57. Buckeyes 24–10.
- OSU – Tim Spencer 18-yard run (Rick Spangler kick), 7:58. Buckeyes 31–10.
- OSU – Rick Spangler 37-yard field goal, 6:00. Buckeyes 34–10.

Fourth quarter

- OSU – Jimmy Gayle 1-yard run (Rick Spangler kick), 12:58. Buckeyes 41–10.
- BYU – Gordon Hudson 13-yard pass from Steve Young (Kurt Gunther kick), 7:09. Buckeyes 41–17.
- OSU – Jimmy Gayle 5-yard run (kick failed), 2:05. Buckeyes 47–17.

Statistics	OSU	BYU
First downs	24	21
Plays–yards	85–461	64–371
Rushes–yards	66–329	18–19
Passing yards	132	352
Passing: comp–att–int	11–19–0	28–46–1
Turnovers	1	2

Team	Category	Player	Statistics
Ohio State	Passing	Mike Tomczak	11/19, 132 yards
Ohio State	Rushing	Tim Spencer	21 rushes, 167 yards, 2 TD
Ohio State	Receiving	Gary Williams	5 receptions, 63 yards
BYU	Passing	Steve Young	27/45, 341 yards, 2 TD, INT
BYU	Rushing	Waymon Hamilton	3 rushes, 14 yards
BYU	Receiving	Gordon Hudson	7 receptions, 81 yards, TD
