= 1972 Georgia Tech Yellow Jackets football team =

American college football season

1972 Georgia Tech Yellow Jackets football
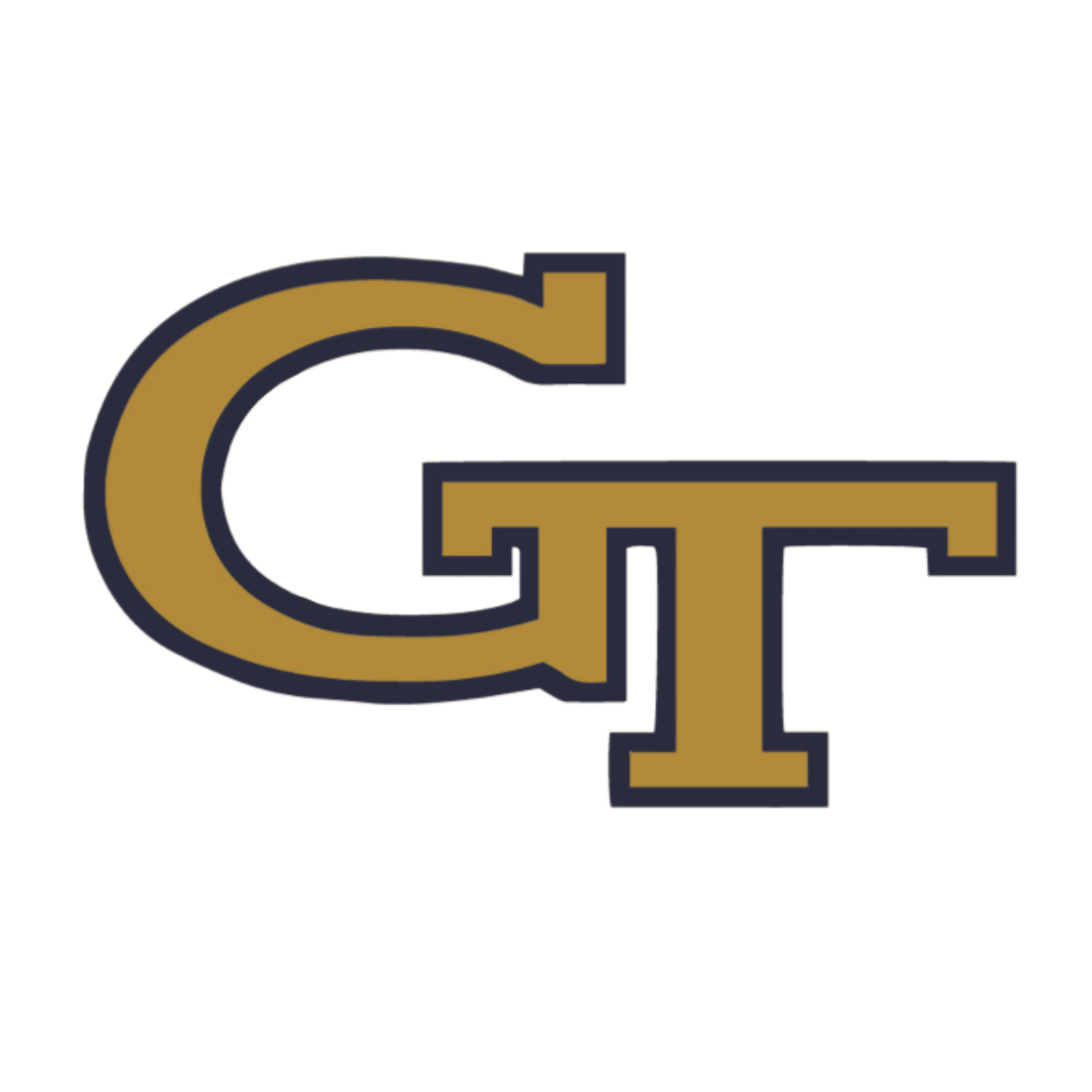

Liberty Bowl champion

Liberty Bowl, W 31–30 vs. Iowa State
- Conference: Independent

Ranking
- AP: No. 20
- Record: 7–4–1
- Head coach: Bill Fulcher (1st season)
- Captains: Brad Bourne; Rick Lantz
- Home stadium: Grant Field

1972 NCAA University Division independents football records
	Conf.			Overall
Team	W	L	T	W		L		T
No. 10 Penn State		–		10	–	2	–	0
No. 14 Notre Dame		–		8	–	3	–	0
Utah State		–		8	–	3	–	0
West Virginia		–		8	–	4	–	0
Florida State		–		7	–	4	–	0
Northern Illinois		–		7	–	4	–	0
Rutgers		–		7	–	4	–	0
No. 20 Georgia Tech		–		7	–	4	–	1
Air Force		–		6	–	4	–	0
Army		–		6	–	4	–	0
Virginia Tech		–		6	–	4	–	1
Houston		–		6	–	4	–	1
Tulane		–		6	–	5	–	0
Temple		–		5	–	4	–	0
Colgate		–		5	–	4	–	1
Holy Cross		–		5	–	4	–	1
Syracuse		–		5	–	6	–	0
Miami (FL)		–		5	–	6	–	0
Dayton		–		4	–	6	–	1
Boston College		–		4	–	7	–	0
Navy		–		4	–	7	–	0
South Carolina		–		4	–	7	–	0
Southern Miss		–		3	–	7	–	1
Xavier		–		3	–	8	–	0
Marshall		–		2	–	8	–	0
Cincinnati		–		2	–	9	–	0
Villanova		–		2	–	9	–	0
Pittsburgh		–		1	–	10	–	0
Rankings from AP Poll

The 1972 Georgia Tech Yellow Jackets football team represented the Georgia Institute of Technology as an independent during the 1972 NCAA University Division football season. The Yellow Jackets were led by first-year head coach Bill Fulcher and played their home games at Grant Field in Atlanta. They were invited to the 1972 Liberty Bowl, where they defeated Iowa State, 31–30.

== Schedule ==
Date	Time	Opponent	Site	TV	Result	Attendance	Source
September 9		No. 15 Tennessee	Grant Field; Atlanta, GA (rivalry)	ABC	L 3–34	52,112	
September 16		South Carolina	Grant Field; Atlanta, GA		W 34–6	48,224	
September 23		at No. 18 Michigan State	Spartan Stadium; East Lansing, MI		W 21–16	77,141	
September 30		Rice	Grant Field; Atlanta, GA		T 36–36	41,179	
October 7		Clemson	Grant Field; Atlanta, GA (rivalry)		W 31–9	48,624	
October 21		at No. 14 Auburn	Cliff Hare Stadium; Auburn, AL (rivalry)		L 14–24	60,261	
October 28		Tulane^{†}	Grant Field; Atlanta, GA		W 21–7	48,096	
November 4		at Duke	Wallace Wade Stadium; Durham, NC		L 14–20	37,300	
November 11		Boston College	Grant Field; Atlanta, GA		W 42–10	36,114	
November 18	2:00 p.m.	Navy	Grant Field; Atlanta, GA		W 30–7	39,233	
December 2		at Georgia	Sanford Stadium; Athens, GA (Clean, Old-Fashioned Hate)		L 7–27	60,241	
December 18		vs. Iowa State	Liberty Bowl Memorial Stadium; Memphis, TN (Liberty Bowl)	ABC	W 31–30	50,021	
^{†}Homecoming; Rankings from AP Poll released prior to the game; All times are in Eastern time

== Roster ==
1972 Georgia Tech Yellow Jackets football team roster
Players			Coaches
Offense: Pos. / # / Name / Class; QB / 1 / Eddie McAshan / Sr	Defense: Pos. / # / Name / Class	Special teams: Pos. / # / Name / Class	Head coach: Bill Fulcher; Coordinators/assistant coaches Legend: (C) Team captain; (S) Suspended; (I) Ineligible; Injured; Redshirt
