= 1972 Western Michigan Broncos football team =

American college football season

1972 Western Michigan Broncos football
- Conference: Mid-American Conference
- Head coach: Bill Doolittle (9th season)
- MVP: Dominic Riggio
- Captains: Bernard Thomas; Keith Pretty
- Home stadium: Waldo Stadium

1972 Mid-American Conference football standings
	Conf.					Overall
Team	W		L		T	W		L		T
Kent State $	4	–	1	–	0	6	–	5	–	1
Bowling Green	3	–	1	–	1	6	–	3	–	1
Western Michigan	2	–	2	–	1	7	–	3	–	1
Miami (OH)	2	–	3	–	0	7	–	3	–	0
Toledo	2	–	3	–	0	6	–	5	–	0
Ohio	1	–	4	–	0	3	–	8	–	0
$ – Conference champion

The 1972 Western Michigan Broncos football team represented Western Michigan University in the Mid-American Conference (MAC) during the 1972 NCAA University Division football season. In their ninth season under head coach Bill Doolittle, the Broncos compiled a 7–3–1 record (2–2–1 against MAC opponents), finished in third place in the MAC, and outscored their opponents, 229 to 201. The team played its home games at Waldo Stadium in Kalamazoo, Michigan.

The team's statistical leaders included Steve Doolittle with 518 passing yards, Larry Cates with 660 rushing yards, and Bob Gavinski with 290 receiving yards. Defensive tackle Bernard Thomas and tight end Keith Pretty were the team captains. Linebacker Dominic Riggio received the team's most outstanding player award.

== Schedule ==
Date	Time	Opponent	Site	Result	Attendance	Source
September 9	1:30 p.m.	Long Beach State*	Waldo Stadium; Kalamazoo, MI	W 28–20	18,150	
September 16	10:30 p.m.	at Fresno State*	Ratcliffe Stadium; Fresno, CA	L 14–41	7,799	
September 23	2:30 p.m.	at Northern Illinois*	Huskie Stadium; DeKalb, IL	W 14–10	7,066	
September 30	1:30 p.m.	Bowling Green	Waldo Stadium; Kalamazoo, MI	T 13–13	17,850	
October 7	1:30 p.m.	at Kent State	Dix Stadium; Kent, OH	W 13–12	7,738	
October 14	1:30 p.m.	Toledo	Waldo Stadium; Kalamazoo, MI	L 13–20	19,000	
October 21	1:30 p.m.	at Marshall*	Fairfield Stadium; Huntington, WV	W 34–0	10,875	
October 28	1:30 p.m.	Ohio	Waldo Stadium; Kalamazoo, MI	W 34–17	18,000	
November 4		at Miami (OH)	Miami Field; Oxford, OH	L 8–38	13,191	
November 11	1:30 p.m.	Ball State*	Waldo Stadium; Kalamazoo, MI	W 31–14	13,000	
November 18	1:30 p.m.	Idaho*	Waldo Stadium; Kalamazoo, MI	W 27–16	16,100	
*Non-conference game; All times are in Eastern time
