= Earle Bruce =

American football player (1931–2018)

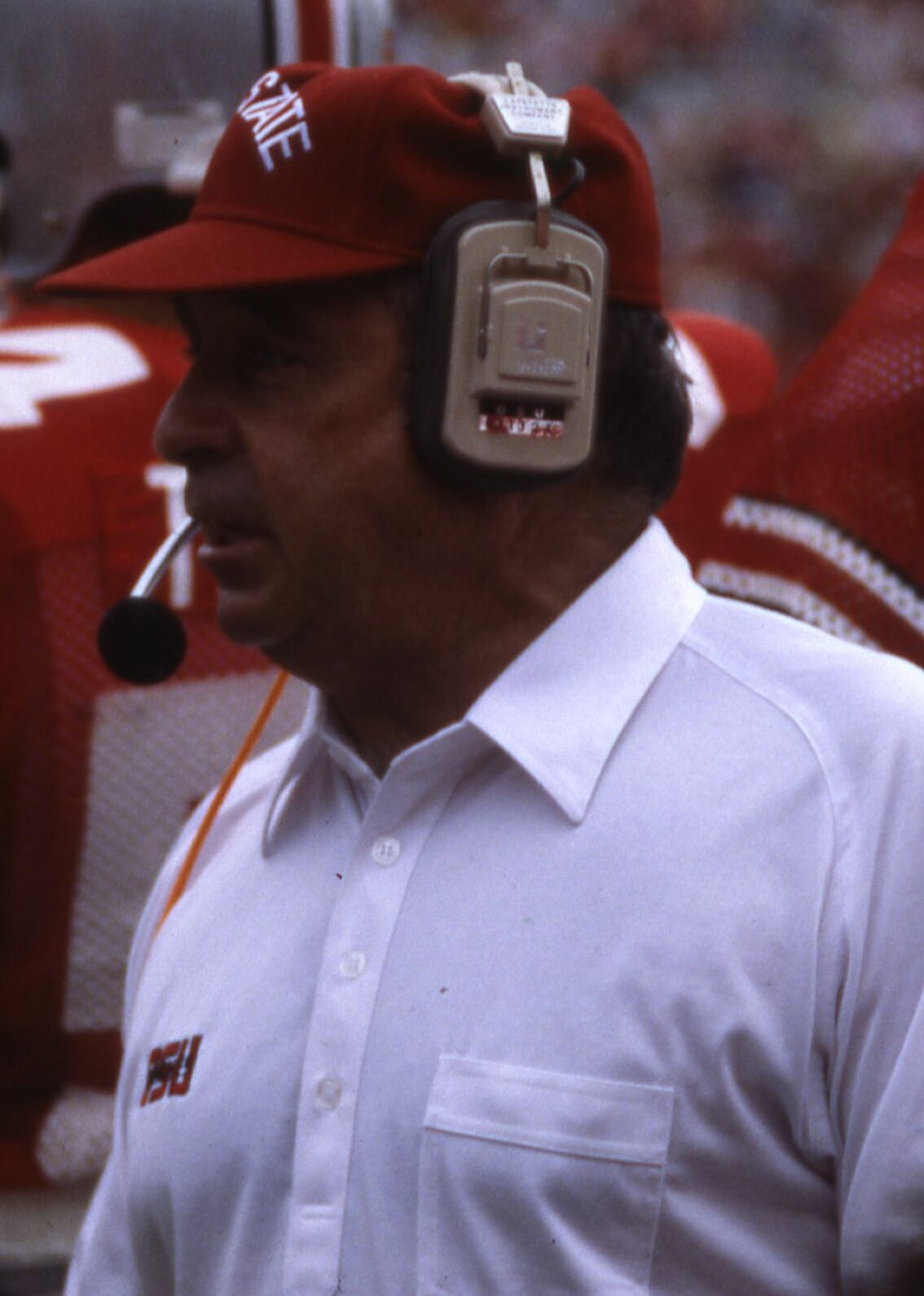
- Bruce in 1986

Biographical details
- Born: March 8, 1931; Pittsburgh, Pennsylvania, U.S.
- Died: April 20, 2018 (aged 87); Columbus, Ohio, U.S.

Playing career
- 1951: Ohio State
- Position: Running back

Coaching career (HC unless noted)
- 1953–1955: Mansfield HS (OH) (assistant)
- 1956–1959: Salem HS (OH)
- 1960–1963: Sandusky HS (OH)
- 1964–1965: Massillon Washington HS (OH)
- 1966–1971: Ohio State (assistant)
- 1972: Tampa
- 1973–1978: Iowa State
- 1979–1987: Ohio State
- 1988: Northern Iowa
- 1989–1992: Colorado State
- 1994: Cleveland Thunderbolts
- 1995–1996: St. Louis Stampede
- 2001: Iowa Barnstormers
- 2004: Columbus Destroyers

Head coaching record
- Overall: 154–90–2 (college); 82–12–3 (high school); 19–25 (AFL)
- Bowls: 7–5

Accomplishments and honors

Championships
- 4 Big Ten (1979, 1981, 1984, 1986)

Awards
- AFCA Coach of the Year (1979); Big Ten Coach of the Year (1979); 2× Big Eight Coach of the Year (1976, 1977)
- College Football Hall of Fame; Inducted in 2002 (profile)

Earle Bruce (March 8, 1931 – April 20, 2018) was an American football player and coach. He served as the head football coach at the University of Tampa (1972), Iowa State University (1973–1978), Ohio State University (1979–1987), the University of Northern Iowa (1988), and Colorado State University (1989–1992), compiling a career college football record of 154–90–2. At Ohio State, Bruce succeeded the legendary Woody Hayes and won four Big Ten Conference titles. He was inducted into the College Football Hall of Fame as a coach in 2002. Bruce returned to coaching in 2001 to helm the Iowa Barnstormers of the Arena Football League for a season and also later guided the Columbus Destroyers.

== As a player and player/coach ==
Earle played for the Campers of Allegany High School in Cumberland, Maryland. Bruce was recruited as a fullback at the Ohio State University by head coach Wes Fesler. He played on the OSU freshman team in 1950, but before he could join the varsity team in 1951 he suffered a torn meniscus, ending his football playing career. Ohio State football coach Woody Hayes asked Bruce to join the coaching staff, which he did until his graduation in 1953. He was a member of Chi Phi fraternity while attending Ohio State.

== Coaching career ==
Bruce accumulated a collegiate coaching record of 154–90–2 with five different universities. Preceding that, Bruce was one of the most successful high school football coaches in Ohio history, accumulating a record of 82–12–3 in 10 seasons of head coaching positions with three Ohio high schools. He led four different college teams to bowl games, where he had a 7–5 record.

=== High school coaching ===
Upon graduating from Ohio State, Bruce accepted a position as an assistant coach at Mansfield High School in Mansfield, Ohio. In 1956, Bruce accepted his first head coaching position, at Salem High School in Salem, Ohio. Over the next four seasons, he led the Quakers to a record of 28–9. From 1960 until 1963, Bruce coached the Blue Streaks at Sandusky High School, Sandusky, Ohio. He compiled a record at Sandusky of 34–3–3.

Massillon High School then hired Bruce as head coach, where his teams went undefeated in 1964 and 1965. Though the Massillon Tigers have gained national fame for their football teams over the years,

=== College coaching ===
On the strength of his success at Massillon, Bruce returned to Ohio State in 1966 as a position coach for the offensive line and later defensive backs. After five seasons the University of Tampa brought Bruce on as head coach in 1972. During what would be his only season, Tampa went 10–2, including a win in the Tangerine Bowl. Bruce moved into the head coaching position at Iowa State University following his success at Tampa. Iowa State experienced some success in six seasons with Bruce as head coach, including the third and fourth bowl appearances in school history. Bruce is the first coach in modern times to leave Iowa State with a winning record. In 2000, Iowa State inducted Bruce into their school hall of fame, named the Louis Menze Hall of Fame.

=== Ohio State ===
After Woody Hayes was fired from Ohio State, Bruce was offered that head coaching position. Bruce was Ohio State's head coach from 1979 to 1987. In Bruce's first year, Ohio State went undefeated in the regular season and played in the Rose Bowl, losing the game—and at least a share of the national championship—by a single point.

The Buckeyes would win at least nine games in each of Bruce's first eight years, including a 10-win season in 1986. They also won or shared three more Big Ten titles (outright in 1984, shared in 1981 and 1986). However, they would only appear in one more Rose Bowl (after the 1984 season–Ohio State's last Rose Bowl appearance until after the 1996 season) and would only tally one more top ten finish (in 1986). This rankled a fan base used to contending for a national title every year.

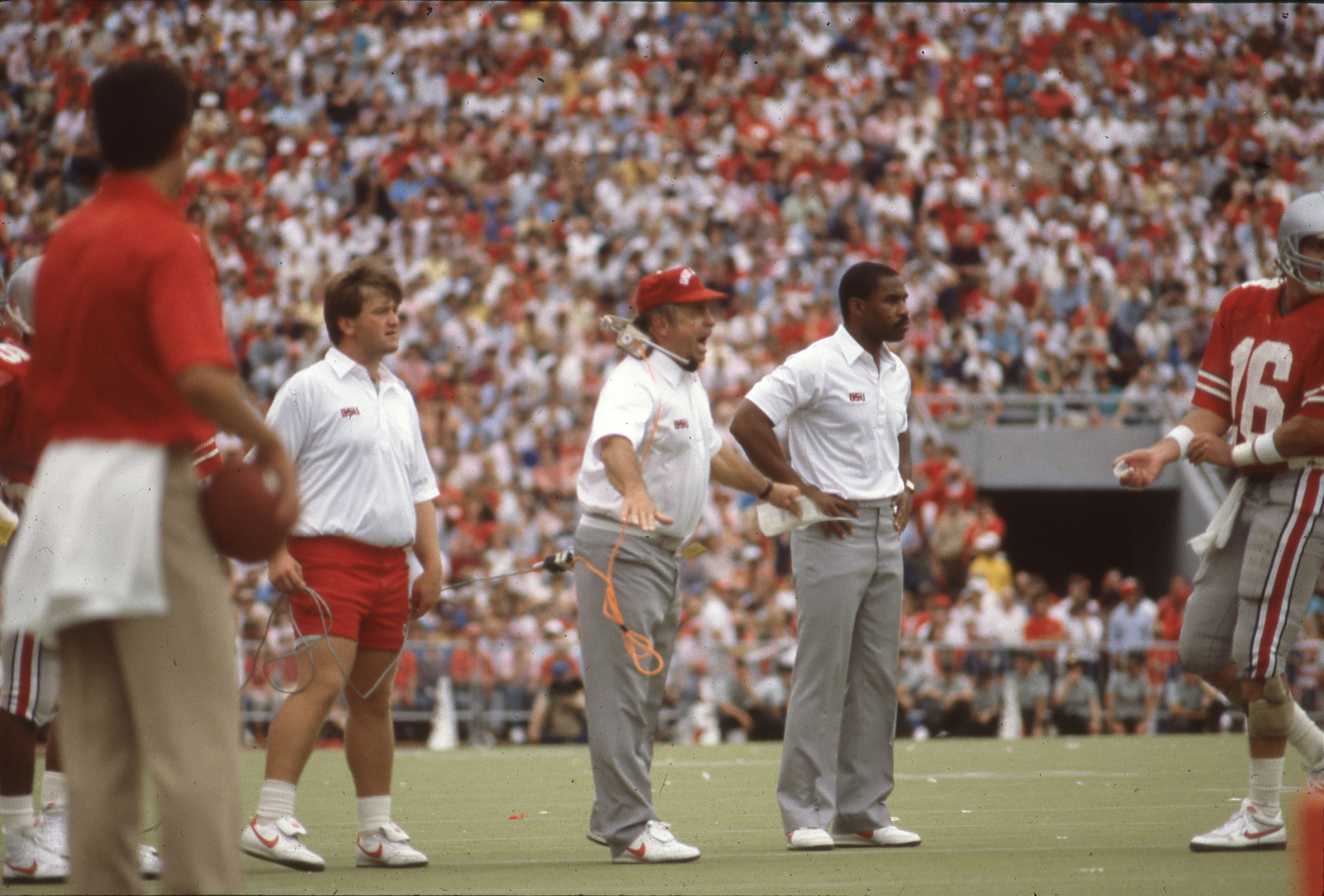
Bruce coaching the Buckeyes in 1986

In 1987, Ohio State was sent reeling when star receiver Cris Carter was kicked off the team for signing with an agent. Without Carter, the school's all-time leader in receptions, the Buckeyes appeared to be a rudderless team. They lost to Indiana for the first time in 38 years, with Bruce calling the loss “the darkest day in Ohio State football”, and never recovered. Ultimately, the Buckeyes suffered their first non-winning record in Big Ten play since 1966, and only their sixth non-winning conference record since the end of World War II.

Bruce was fired on November 16, just prior to the last game of the season—against Michigan—but was allowed to finish out the year. Athletic director Rick Bay resigned rather than carry out the order to fire Bruce. School president Edward H. Jennings would not say what the reason was for Bruce's dismissal, while Bruce noted his displeasure with the firing, saying "I don’t particularly care for the president. I don’t care for some members of the Board of Trustees, but I have no selection in that. I guess the best way to explain it is, they’re not my kind of guys, that’s all, my kind of people. Probably, that’s why I’m fired, because I’m not their kind.”

Bruce was able to defeat Michigan at Ann Arbor, assuring them of a .500 conference record. After the game, Bo Schembechler told Bruce, "I always mind losing to Ohio State but I didn't mind so much today."

Bruce filed a lawsuit against Ohio State after being fired. Twelve days after his firing, Bruce won an out-of-court settlement for $471,000, with both Bruce and Jennings writing apology statements and agreeing not to make detrimental comments or alter the deal.

=== After Ohio State ===
Bruce was the leading candidate to replace Bob Valesente as head coach of the Kansas Jayhawks after the 1987 season, but due to a contract dispute, KU did not hire him. KU instead hired Glen Mason out of Kent State. Bruce took over the head coaching position at the University of Northern Iowa for one year, and then finished his intercollegiate coaching career at Colorado State University. In his second season, he led the Rams to a winning record and a victory over Oregon in the Freedom Bowl, their first bowl appearance since 1948 and their first bowl victory ever. However, this did not last, and the Rams would only win a total of eight games in the next two years. Bruce was fired after the 1992 season for, among other things, verbally and physically abusing his players and discouraging players from taking classes that conflicted with football practice.

In his final season at Fort Collins, he coached the Rams to a 17–14 victory over LSU in Baton Rouge. Five years earlier, his final Ohio State team played LSU to a 13–13 tie in Tiger Stadium in a nationally televised game.

After Colorado State, he moved on to the Arena Football League, where he coached the Cleveland Thunderbolts in 1994 and the St. Louis Stampede in 1995 and 1996 before retiring.

== Return to coaching and later life ==
In 2003, Bruce came out of retirement to coach the final ten games for the Arena Football League's Iowa Barnstormers, guiding them to a 7–3 record. In 2004, Bruce returned to Ohio to become the head coach for the Columbus Destroyers, who were moving from Buffalo to Columbus that year. He retired to a front office position after coaching the Destroyers to a 6–10 record in 2004, and was replaced as head coach by Chris Spielman, who played for Bruce at Ohio State. Bruce finished with a 19–25 record over four seasons in the AFL.

Thereafter, Bruce worked as an Ohio State football analyst for WTVN 610AM in Columbus as well an analyst for ONN on their OSU programming. On October 1, 2016, Bruce was honored during the Rutgers-Ohio State halftime and dotted the "i" during Script Ohio.

In his private life, Bruce was married with four children. It was revealed, on August 25, 2017, that Bruce was in the early stages of Alzheimer's disease. His death from complications of that disease was announced by his family on April 20, 2018.

== Head coaching record ==
=== College ===
Year	Team	Overall	Conference	Standing	Bowl/playoffs	Coaches^{#}	AP^{°}
Tampa Spartans (NCAA College Division independent) (1972)
1972	Tampa	10–2			W Tangerine		
Tampa:		10–2					
Iowa State Cyclones (Big Eight Conference) (1973–1978)
1973	Iowa State	4–7	2–5	T–6th			
1974	Iowa State	4–7	2–5	6th			
1975	Iowa State	4–7	1–6	7th			
1976	Iowa State	8–3	4–3	T–4th		18	19
1977	Iowa State	8–4	5–2	T–2nd	L Peach		
1978	Iowa State	8–4	4–3	T–3rd	L Hall of Fame Classic		
Iowa State:		36–32	18–24				
Ohio State Buckeyes (Big Ten Conference) (1979–1987)
1979	Ohio State	11–1	8–0	1st	L Rose	4	4
1980	Ohio State	9–3	7–1	T–2nd	L Fiesta	15	15
1981	Ohio State	9–3	6–2	T–1st	W Liberty	12	15
1982	Ohio State	9–3	7–1	2nd	W Holiday	12	12
1983	Ohio State	9–3	6–3	4th	W Fiesta	8	9
1984	Ohio State	9–3	7–2	1st	L Rose	12	13
1985	Ohio State	9–3	5–3	T–4th	W Florida Citrus	11	14
1986	Ohio State	10–3	7–1	T–1st	W Cotton	6	7
1987	Ohio State	6–4–1	4–4	5th			
Ohio State:		81–26–1	57–17				
Northern Iowa Panthers (Gateway Collegiate Athletic Conference) (1988)
1988	Northern Iowa	5–6	3–3	4th			
Northern Iowa:		5–6	3–3				
Colorado State Rams (Western Athletic Conference) (1989–1992)
1989	Colorado State	5–5–1	4–3	T–5th			
1990	Colorado State	9–4	6–1	2nd	W Freedom		
1991	Colorado State	3–8	2–6	T–8th			
1992	Colorado State	5–7	3–5	T–7th			
Colorado State:		22–24–1	15–15				
Total:		154–90–2					
National championship Conference title Conference division title or championship game berth
^{#}Rankings from final Coaches Poll.; ^{°}Rankings from final AP Poll.
