= 1972 Miami Hurricanes football team =

American college football season

1972 Miami Hurricanes football
- Conference: Independent
- Record: 5–6
- Head coach: Fran Curci (2nd season)
- Offensive coordinator: Carl Selmer (1st season)
- MVP: Chuck Foreman
- Home stadium: Miami Orange Bowl

1972 NCAA University Division independents football records
	Conf.			Overall
Team	W	L	T	W		L		T
No. 10 Penn State		–		10	–	2	–	0
No. 14 Notre Dame		–		8	–	3	–	0
Utah State		–		8	–	3	–	0
West Virginia		–		8	–	4	–	0
Florida State		–		7	–	4	–	0
Northern Illinois		–		7	–	4	–	0
Rutgers		–		7	–	4	–	0
No. 20 Georgia Tech		–		7	–	4	–	1
Air Force		–		6	–	4	–	0
Army		–		6	–	4	–	0
Virginia Tech		–		6	–	4	–	1
Houston		–		6	–	4	–	1
Tulane		–		6	–	5	–	0
Temple		–		5	–	4	–	0
Colgate		–		5	–	4	–	1
Holy Cross		–		5	–	4	–	1
Syracuse		–		5	–	6	–	0
Miami (FL)		–		5	–	6	–	0
Dayton		–		4	–	6	–	1
Boston College		–		4	–	7	–	0
Navy		–		4	–	7	–	0
South Carolina		–		4	–	7	–	0
Southern Miss		–		3	–	7	–	1
Xavier		–		3	–	8	–	0
Marshall		–		2	–	8	–	0
Cincinnati		–		2	–	9	–	0
Villanova		–		2	–	9	–	0
Pittsburgh		–		1	–	10	–	0
Rankings from AP Poll

The 1972 Miami Hurricanes football team represented the University of Miami as an independent during the 1972 NCAA University Division football season. Led by second-year head coach Fran Curci, the Hurricanes played their home games at the Miami Orange Bowl in Miami, Florida. Miami finished the season with a record of 5–6.

== Schedule ==
Date	Time	Opponent	Site	Result	Attendance	Source
September 16	7:33 p.m.	No. 20 Florida State	Miami Orange Bowl; Miami, FL (rivalry)	L 14–37	35,421	
September 23	8:30 p.m.	at No. 14 Texas	Memorial Stadium; Austin, TX	L 10–23	62,000	
October 7	8:30 p.m.	at Baylor	Baylor Stadium; Waco, TX	L 3–10	35,000–35,142	
October 14		Tulane	Miami Orange Bowl; Miami, FL	W 24–21	18,956	
October 21	7:31 p.m.	Houston	Miami Orange Bowl; Miami, FL	W 33–13	17,860	
October 28	1:50 p.m.	at Army	Michie Stadium; West Point, NY	W 28–7	42,100	
November 4	7:31 p.m.	UNLV	Miami Orange Bowl; Miami, FL	W 51–7	18,987–24,387	
November 11	7:02 p.m.	at Tampa	Tampa Stadium; Tampa, FL	L 0–7	22,525	
November 18	1:30 p.m.	at No. 10 Notre Dame	Notre Dame Stadium; Notre Dame, IN (rivalry)	L 17–20	59,075	
November 25		Maryland	Miami Orange Bowl; Miami, FL	W 28–8	17,342	
December 2		at Florida	Florida Field; Gainesville, FL (rivalry)	L 6–17	46,432	
Rankings from AP Poll released prior to the game; All times are in Eastern time

== Personnel ==
1972 Miami Hurricanes football team roster
Players
Coaches
Offense

Pos.	#	Name	Class
WR		Witt Beckman
RB		Jack Brasington
OL		Stan Buljaski
OL		Bill Capraun
WR		Silvio Cardoso
QB		Ed Carney
TE		Phil Corrigan
OL		Jim Dittmar
RB		Lane Exum
RB		Chuck Foreman
OL		Steve Gaunt
QB		Coy Hall
OL		Dennis Harrah
TE		Phil Iredale
WR		Mike Latimer
OL		Monk Laurenza
WR		Steve Marcantonio
RB		Don Martin
WR		Bill Perkins
RB		Al Reynaud
OL		Wilmore Ritchie
OL		Fred Ross
OL		Golden Ruel
RB		Tom Smith
WR		Walt Sweeting
RB		Woody Thompson
DL		Johnny Williams

Defense

Pos.	#	Name	Class
DL		Gary Altheide
DB		Mike Archer
DL		Mike Barnes
DL		Rubin Carter
DB		Booker Cope
DL		Tony Cristani
DL		Mike Daly
DL		Bo Dunn
DL		Bill Frohbose
DL		Jose Gonzalez
DB		Paul Horschel
DB		Greg Ingram
DL		Mike Leary
DB		Eldridge Mitchell
DB		Burgess Owens
DL		Al Palewicz
LB		Mike Riley
LB		Harold Sears
DB		Gary Streicher
DL		Ken White

Special teams

Pos.	#	Name	Class
K		Mike Burke

Head coach

- Fran Curci

Coordinators/assistant coaches

Legend

- (C) Team captain
- (S) Suspended
- (I) Ineligible
- Injured
- Redshirt
