= 1972 Penn State Nittany Lions football team =

American college football season

1972 Penn State Nittany Lions football

Eastern champion

Sugar Bowl, L 0–14 vs. Oklahoma
- Conference: Independent

Ranking
- Coaches: No. 8
- AP: No. 10
- Record: 10–2
- Head coach: Joe Paterno (7th season)
- Offensive scheme: I formation
- Defensive coordinator: Jim O'Hora (7th season)
- Base defense: 4–3
- Captains: Gregg Ducatte; Jim Heller; John Hufnagel; Carl Schaukowitch
- Home stadium: Beaver Stadium

1972 NCAA University Division independents football records
	Conf.			Overall
Team	W	L	T	W		L		T
No. 10 Penn State		–		10	–	2	–	0
No. 14 Notre Dame		–		8	–	3	–	0
Utah State		–		8	–	3	–	0
West Virginia		–		8	–	4	–	0
Florida State		–		7	–	4	–	0
Northern Illinois		–		7	–	4	–	0
Rutgers		–		7	–	4	–	0
No. 20 Georgia Tech		–		7	–	4	–	1
Air Force		–		6	–	4	–	0
Army		–		6	–	4	–	0
Virginia Tech		–		6	–	4	–	1
Houston		–		6	–	4	–	1
Tulane		–		6	–	5	–	0
Temple		–		5	–	4	–	0
Colgate		–		5	–	4	–	1
Holy Cross		–		5	–	4	–	1
Syracuse		–		5	–	6	–	0
Miami (FL)		–		5	–	6	–	0
Dayton		–		4	–	6	–	1
Boston College		–		4	–	7	–	0
Navy		–		4	–	7	–	0
South Carolina		–		4	–	7	–	0
Southern Miss		–		3	–	7	–	1
Xavier		–		3	–	8	–	0
Marshall		–		2	–	8	–	0
Cincinnati		–		2	–	9	–	0
Villanova		–		2	–	9	–	0
Pittsburgh		–		1	–	10	–	0
Rankings from AP Poll

The 1972 Penn State Nittany Lions football team represented the Pennsylvania State University as an independent during the 1972 NCAA University Division football season. Led by seventh-year head coach Joe Paterno, the Nittany Lions compiled a record of 10–2 and lost to Oklahoma in the Sugar Bowl. Penn State was the Lambert-Meadowlands Trophy as the best college football team in the Eastern United States. The team played home games in Beaver Stadium in University Park, Pennsylvania.

As a result of using ineligible players, the Oklahoma Sooners were ordered to forfeit seven wins from their 1972 season, including their win over the Nittany Lions in the Sugar Bowl. However, Paterno and Penn State refused to accept the forfeit, and the bowl game is officially recorded as a loss.

== Schedule ==
Date	Time	Opponent	Rank	Site	TV	Result	Attendance	Source
September 16		at No. 7 Tennessee	No. 6	Neyland Stadium; Knoxville, TN		L 21–28	71,647	
September 23	1:30 p.m.	Navy	No. 11	Beaver Stadium; University Park, PA		W 21–10	50,457	
September 30		Iowa	No. 13	Beaver Stadium; University Park, PA		W 14–10	58,065	
October 7		at Illinois	No. 16	Memorial Stadium; Champaign, IL		W 35–17	60,394	
October 14	1:59 p.m.	at Army	No. 15	Michie Stadium; West Point, NY		W 45–0	42,352	
October 21		Syracuse^{†}	No. 12	Beaver Stadium; University Park, PA (rivalry)		W 17–0	60,465	
October 28		at No. T–18 West Virginia	No. 11	Mountaineer Field; Morgantown, WV (rivalry)	ABC	W 28–19	37,000	
November 4		Maryland	No. 10	Beaver Stadium; University Park, PA (rivalry)		W 46–16	58,171	
November 11		NC State	No. 10	Beaver Stadium; University Park, PA		W 37–22	54,274	
November 18		at Boston College	No. 6	Alumni Stadium; Chestnut Hill, MA		W 45–26	23,119	
November 25		Pittsburgh	No. 6	Beaver Stadium; University Park, PA (rivalry)		W 49–27	38,600	
December 31		vs. No. 2 Oklahoma	No. 5	Tulane Stadium; New Orleans, LA (Sugar Bowl)	ABC	L 0–14	80,123	
^{†}Homecoming; Rankings from AP Poll released prior to the game; All times are in Eastern time

== Rankings ==
Ranking movements Legend: ██ Increase in ranking ██ Decrease in ranking т = Tied with team above or below ( ) = First-place votes
	Week														
Poll	Pre	1	2	3	4	5	6	7	8	9	10	11	12	13	Final
AP	5	6 (1)	11	13	16	15	12	11	10	10	6	6	5	5	10
Coaches	6	7	14 т	16	19	17	13	10	11	11	8	7	7	8	Not released

== Roster ==
1972 Penn State Nittany Lions football team roster
Players
Coaches
Offense

Pos.	#	Name	Class
OT	74	Jeff Bleamer	So
C	50	Rick Brown	Sr
RB	22	John Cappelletti	Jr
OT	77	Charlie Getty	Jr
WR	28	Gary Hayman	Jr
QB	16	John Hufnagel	Sr
C	51	Bill Johnson	So
OT	65	Phil LaPorta	Jr
C	54	Mark Markovich	Jr
G	69	Carl Schaukowitch	Sr

Defense

Pos.	#	Name	Class
LB	68	Doug Allen	Jr
DE	83	Bruce Bannon	Sr
DT	53	Randy Crowder	Jr
LB	66	Chris Devlin	So
DE	85	Dave Graf	So
DT	79	Mike Hartenstine	So
LB	41	Tom Hull	Jr
LB	47	Jim Laslavic	Sr
LB	89	Ed O'Neil	Jr
LB	81	John Skorupan	Sr

Special teams

Pos.	#	Name	Class

Head coach

- Joe Paterno

Coordinators/assistant coaches

- Booker Brooks
- John Chuckran
- Jim O'Hora
- Frank Patrick
- Bob Phillips
- Jerry Sandusky
- Jim Weaver
- George Welsh
- J. T. White

Legend

- (C) Team captain
- (S) Suspended
- (I) Ineligible
- Injured
- Redshirt

Roster

== Awards ==
- Joe Paterno

Walter Camp Coach of the Year

== NFL draft ==
Five Nittany Lions were drafted in the 1973 NFL draft.

Round	Pick	Overall	Name	Position	Team
3rd	19	71	Jim Laslavic	Linebacker	Detroit Lions
5th	12	116	Bruce Bannon	Linebacker	New York Jets
6th	6	136	John Skorupan	Linebacker	Buffalo Bills
14th	10	348	John Hufnagel	Quarterback	Denver Broncos
15th	17	381	Carl Schaukowitch	Offensive guard	New York Giants
