= 1972 Ohio Bobcats football team =

American college football season

1972 Ohio Bobcats football
- Conference: Mid-American Conference
- Record: 3–8 (1–4 MAC)
- Head coach: Bill Hess (15th season)
- Home stadium: Peden Stadium

1972 Mid-American Conference football standings
	Conf.					Overall
Team	W		L		T	W		L		T
Kent State $	4	–	1	–	0	6	–	5	–	1
Bowling Green	3	–	1	–	1	6	–	3	–	1
Western Michigan	2	–	2	–	1	7	–	3	–	1
Miami (OH)	2	–	3	–	0	7	–	3	–	0
Toledo	2	–	3	–	0	6	–	5	–	0
Ohio	1	–	4	–	0	3	–	8	–	0
$ – Conference champion

The 1972 Ohio Bobcats football team was an American football team that represented Ohio University in the Mid-American Conference (MAC) during the 1972 NCAA University Division football season. In their 15th season under head coach Bill Hess, the Bobcats compiled a 3–8 record (1–4 against MAC opponents), finished in sixth place, and were outscored by all opponents by a combined total of 321 to 185. They played their home games in Peden Stadium in Athens, Ohio.

== Schedule ==
Date	Time	Opponent	Site	Result	Attendance	Source
September 9	1:30 p.m.	Central Michigan*	Peden Stadium; Athens, OH	W 26–21	10,473	
September 16	4:30 p.m.	at Idaho*	Kibbie Dome; Moscow, ID	L 14–17	15,000	
September 23	1:30 p.m.	at Kent State	Dix Stadium; Kent, OH	L 14–37	8,215	
September 30	1:30 p.m.	Toledo	Peden Stadium; Athens, OH	W 38–22	15,021	
October 7		at Cincinnati*	Nippert Stadium; Cincinnati, OH	L 28–14	8,511	
October 14		at Miami (OH)	Miami Field; Oxford, OH (rivalry)	L 7–31	16,753	
October 21		Virginia Tech*	Peden Stadium; Athens, OH	L 21–53	13,344	
October 28	1:30 p.m.	at Western Michigan	Waldo Stadium; Kalamazoo, MI	L 17–34	18,000	
November 4	1:30 p.m.	at Bowling Green	Doyt Perry Stadium; Bowling Green, OH	L 0–17	17,867	
November 11	8:34 p.m.	at Tulane*	Tulane Stadium; New Orleans, LA	L 6–44	17,535	
November 18	1:30 p.m.	Marshall*	Peden Stadium; Athens, OH (rivalry)	L 14–31	15,023	
*Non-conference game; All times are in Eastern time
