= 1972 Miami Redskins football team =

American college football season

1972 Miami Redskins football
- Conference: Mid-American Conference
- Record: 7–3 (2–3 MAC)
- Head coach: Bill Mallory (4th season)
- MVP: Bob Hitchens
- Captains: Mike Poff; Bob Williams
- Home stadium: Miami Field

1972 Mid-American Conference football standings
| | Conf. | | | | | Overall |
| Team | W | | L | | T | W | | L | | T |
|---|---|---|---|---|---|---|---|---|---|---|
| Kent State $ | 4 | – | 1 | – | 0 | 6 | – | 5 | – | 1 |
| Bowling Green | 3 | – | 1 | – | 1 | 6 | – | 3 | – | 1 |
| Western Michigan | 2 | – | 2 | – | 1 | 7 | – | 3 | – | 1 |
| Miami (OH) | 2 | – | 3 | – | 0 | 7 | – | 3 | – | 0 |
| Toledo | 2 | – | 3 | – | 0 | 6 | – | 5 | – | 0 |
| Ohio | 1 | – | 4 | – | 0 | 3 | – | 8 | – | 0 |
$ – Conference champion

The 1972 Miami Redskins football team was an American football team that represented Miami University in the Mid-American Conference (MAC) during the 1972 NCAA University Division football season. In their fourth season under head coach Bill Mallory, Miami compiled a 7–3 record (2–3 against MAC opponents), finished in a tie for fourth place in the MAC, and outscored all opponents by a combined total of 207 to 117. The team's defense allowed only 11.7 points per game, which ranked 12th among 128 NCAA University Division football teams.

The team's statistical leaders included quarterback Steve Williams with 676 passing yards, tailback Bob Hitchens with 1,370 rushing yards, and John Viher with 414 receiving yards.

Hitchens won the Miami most valuable player award and the MAC Offensive Player of the Year award. Mike Poff and Bob Williams were the team captains.

== Schedule ==
| Date | Time | Opponent | Site | Result | Attendance | Source |
|---|---|---|---|---|---|---|
| September 16 | | Dayton* | Miami Field; Oxford, OH | W 34–7 | 9,252 | |
| September 23 | | Bowling Green | Miami Field; Oxford, OH | L 7–16 | 11,518 | |
| September 30 | | Xavier* | Miami Field; Oxford, OH | W 25–7 | 11,100 | |
| October 7 | 1:30 p.m. | at Marshall* | Fairfield Stadium; Huntington, WV | W 22–7 | 9,475 | |
| October 14 | | Ohio | Miami Field; Oxford, OH (rivalry) | W 31–7 | 16,753 | |
| October 21 | 7:31 p.m. | at South Carolina* | Williams–Brice Stadium; Columbia, SC | W 21–8 | 40,351 | |
| October 28 | 1:30 p.m. | at Toledo | Glass Bowl; Toledo, OH | L 21–35 | 14,281 | |
| November 4 | | Western Michigan | Miami Field; Oxford, OH | W 38–8 | 13,191 | |
| November 11 | | Kent State | Miami Field; Oxford, OH | L 10–21 | 7,165 | |
| November 18 | 1:30 p.m. | at Cincinnati* | Nippert Stadium; Cincinnati, OH (rivalry) | W 23–0 | 7,695 | |
*Non-conference game; All times are in Eastern time
