= 1972 Xavier Musketeers football team =

American college football season

1972 Xavier Musketeers football
- Conference: Independent
- Record: 3–8
- Head coach: Tom Cecchini (1st season)
- Home stadium: Corcoran Stadium

1972 NCAA University Division independents football records
	Conf.			Overall
Team	W	L	T	W		L		T
No. 10 Penn State		–		10	–	2	–	0
No. 14 Notre Dame		–		8	–	3	–	0
Utah State		–		8	–	3	–	0
West Virginia		–		8	–	4	–	0
Florida State		–		7	–	4	–	0
Northern Illinois		–		7	–	4	–	0
Rutgers		–		7	–	4	–	0
No. 20 Georgia Tech		–		7	–	4	–	1
Air Force		–		6	–	4	–	0
Army		–		6	–	4	–	0
Virginia Tech		–		6	–	4	–	1
Houston		–		6	–	4	–	1
Tulane		–		6	–	5	–	0
Temple		–		5	–	4	–	0
Colgate		–		5	–	4	–	1
Holy Cross		–		5	–	4	–	1
Syracuse		–		5	–	6	–	0
Miami (FL)		–		5	–	6	–	0
Dayton		–		4	–	6	–	1
Boston College		–		4	–	7	–	0
Navy		–		4	–	7	–	0
South Carolina		–		4	–	7	–	0
Southern Miss		–		3	–	7	–	1
Xavier		–		3	–	8	–	0
Marshall		–		2	–	8	–	0
Cincinnati		–		2	–	9	–	0
Villanova		–		2	–	9	–	0
Pittsburgh		–		1	–	10	–	0
Rankings from AP Poll

The 1972 Xavier Musketeers football team was an American football team that represented Xavier University as an independent during the 1972 NCAA University Division football season. In their first year under head coach Tom Cecchini, the Musketeers compiled a 3–8 record.

== Schedule ==
Date	Time	Opponent	Site	Result	Attendance	Source
September 9	7:30 p.m.	at Morehead State	Jayne Stadium; Morehead, KY	W 26–7	7,000	
September 16	8:00 p.m.	Temple	Corcoran Stadium; Cincinnati, OH	L 12–16	8,104	
September 23	8:00 p.m.	at Cincinnati	Nippert Stadium; Cincinnati, OH (rivalry)	W 19–7	15,435	
September 30		at Miami (OH)	Miami Field; Oxford, OH	L 7–25	11,100	
October 7	2:30 p.m.	at Northern Illinois	Huskie Stadium; DeKalb, IL	L 7–20	6,282	
October 14	2:00 p.m.	Marshall	Corcoran Stadium; Cincinnati, OH	W 14–0	5,817	
October 21	1:30 p.m.	at Kent State	Dix Stadium; Kent, OH	L 16–26	15,487–15,497	
October 28	2:00 p.m.	Youngstown State	Corcoran Stadium; Cincinnati, OH	L 7–47	3,181	
November 4	1:30 p.m.	at Dayton	Baujan Field; Dayton, OH	L 13–31	11,869	
November 11	1:31 p.m.	at Villanova	Villanova Stadium; Villanova, PA	L 13–40	4,132–5,000	
November 23		Quantico Marines	Corcoran Stadium; Cincinnati, OH	L 0–34	4,017	
All times are in Eastern time
