= 1972 Dayton Flyers football team =

American college football season

1972 Dayton Flyers football
- Conference: Independent
- Record: 4–6–1
- Head coach: John McVay (8th season)
- Home stadium: Baujan Field

1972 NCAA University Division independents football records
	Conf.			Overall
Team	W	L	T	W		L		T
No. 10 Penn State		–		10	–	2	–	0
No. 14 Notre Dame		–		8	–	3	–	0
Utah State		–		8	–	3	–	0
West Virginia		–		8	–	4	–	0
Florida State		–		7	–	4	–	0
Northern Illinois		–		7	–	4	–	0
Rutgers		–		7	–	4	–	0
No. 20 Georgia Tech		–		7	–	4	–	1
Air Force		–		6	–	4	–	0
Army		–		6	–	4	–	0
Virginia Tech		–		6	–	4	–	1
Houston		–		6	–	4	–	1
Tulane		–		6	–	5	–	0
Temple		–		5	–	4	–	0
Colgate		–		5	–	4	–	1
Holy Cross		–		5	–	4	–	1
Syracuse		–		5	–	6	–	0
Miami (FL)		–		5	–	6	–	0
Dayton		–		4	–	6	–	1
Boston College		–		4	–	7	–	0
Navy		–		4	–	7	–	0
South Carolina		–		4	–	7	–	0
Southern Miss		–		3	–	7	–	1
Xavier		–		3	–	8	–	0
Marshall		–		2	–	8	–	0
Cincinnati		–		2	–	9	–	0
Villanova		–		2	–	9	–	0
Pittsburgh		–		1	–	10	–	0
Rankings from AP Poll

The 1972 Dayton Flyers football team represented the University of Dayton as an independent during the 1972 NCAA University Division football season. In their eighth season under head coach John McVay, the Flyers compiled a 4–6–1 record.

== Schedule ==
Date	Time	Opponent	Site	Result	Attendance	Source
September 9		Youngstown State	Baujan Field; Dayton, OH	W 18–13	10,073	
September 16		at Miami (OH)	Miami Field; Oxford, OH	L 7–34	9,252	
September 23	7:30 p.m.	Marshall	Baujan Field; Dayton, OH	W 39–0	10,741	
September 30	7:30 p.m.	Louisville	Baujan Field; Dayton, OH	L 11–28	11,214	
October 7		at Southern Illinois	McAndrew Stadium; Carbondale, IL	T 6–6	10,000	
October 14		at Ball State	Ball State Stadium; Muncie, IN	L 7–28	16,650	
October 21	1:30 p.m.	Toledo	Baujan Field; Dayton, OH	L 17–20	6,130	
October 28		VMI	Baujan Field; Dayton, OH	W 14–10	7,247	
November 4	1:30 p.m.	Xavier	Baujan Field; Dayton, OH	W 31–13	11,869	
November 11	1:30 p.m.	at Bowling Green	Doyt Perry Stadium; Bowling Green, OH	L 0–17	11,729	
November 18		at East Carolina	Ficklen Memorial Stadium; Greenville, NC	L 22–24	10,200	
All times are in Eastern time
