= 1972 Marshall Thundering Herd football team =

American college football season

1972 Marshall Thundering Herd football
- Conference: Independent
- Record: 2–8
- Head coach: Jack Lengyel (2nd season)
- Captains: Randy Kerr; Chuck Wright
- Home stadium: Fairfield Stadium

1972 NCAA University Division independents football records
	Conf.			Overall
Team	W	L	T	W		L		T
No. 10 Penn State		–		10	–	2	–	0
No. 14 Notre Dame		–		8	–	3	–	0
Utah State		–		8	–	3	–	0
West Virginia		–		8	–	4	–	0
Florida State		–		7	–	4	–	0
Northern Illinois		–		7	–	4	–	0
Rutgers		–		7	–	4	–	0
No. 20 Georgia Tech		–		7	–	4	–	1
Air Force		–		6	–	4	–	0
Army		–		6	–	4	–	0
Virginia Tech		–		6	–	4	–	1
Houston		–		6	–	4	–	1
Tulane		–		6	–	5	–	0
Temple		–		5	–	4	–	0
Colgate		–		5	–	4	–	1
Holy Cross		–		5	–	4	–	1
Syracuse		–		5	–	6	–	0
Miami (FL)		–		5	–	6	–	0
Dayton		–		4	–	6	–	1
Boston College		–		4	–	7	–	0
Navy		–		4	–	7	–	0
South Carolina		–		4	–	7	–	0
Southern Miss		–		3	–	7	–	1
Xavier		–		3	–	8	–	0
Marshall		–		2	–	8	–	0
Cincinnati		–		2	–	9	–	0
Villanova		–		2	–	9	–	0
Pittsburgh		–		1	–	10	–	0
Rankings from AP Poll

The 1972 Marshall Thundering Herd football team was an American football team that represented Marshall University as an independent during the 1972 NCAA University Division football season. In its second season under head coach Jack Lengyel, the team compiled a 2–8 record and was outscored by a total of 254 to 93. The team played its home games at Fairfield Stadium in Huntington, West Virginia.

== Schedule ==
Date	Time	Opponent	Site	Result	Attendance	Source
September 16	1:30 p.m.	Morehead State	Fairfield Stadium; Huntington, WV	W 27–24	14,500	
September 23	7:30 p.m.	at Dayton	Baujan Field; Dayton, OH	L 0–39	10,741	
September 30	1:30 p.m.	Northern Illinois	Fairfield Stadium; Huntington, WV	L 7–24	11,350	
October 7	1:30 p.m.	Miami (OH)	Fairfield Stadium; Huntington, WV	L 7–22	9,475	
October 14	2:00 p.m.	at Xavier	Corcoran Stadium; Cincinnati, OH	L 0–14	5,817	
October 21	1:30 p.m.	Western Michigan^{†}	Fairfield Stadium; Huntington, WV	L 0–34	10,875	
October 28	1:30 p.m.	at Bowling Green	Doyt Perry Stadium; Bowling Green, OH	L 7–46	14,156	
November 4	1:30 p.m.	Kent State	Fairfield Stadium; Huntington, WV	L 14–16	12,425	
November 11	7:30 p.m.	at Toledo	Glass Bowl; Toledo, OH	L 0–21	12,102	
November 18	1:30 p.m.	at Ohio	Peden Stadium; Athens, OH (rivalry)	W 31–14	15,023	
^{†}Homecoming; All times are in Eastern time
