= 1972 Notre Dame Fighting Irish football team =

American college football season

1972 Notre Dame Fighting Irish football

Orange Bowl, L 6–40 vs. Nebraska
- Conference: Independent

Ranking
- Coaches: No. 12
- AP: No. 14
- Record: 8–3
- Head coach: Ara Parseghian (9th season)
- Captains: John Dampeer; Greg Marx
- Home stadium: Notre Dame Stadium

1972 NCAA University Division independents football records
	Conf.			Overall
Team	W	L	T	W		L		T
No. 10 Penn State		–		10	–	2	–	0
No. 14 Notre Dame		–		8	–	3	–	0
Utah State		–		8	–	3	–	0
West Virginia		–		8	–	4	–	0
Florida State		–		7	–	4	–	0
Northern Illinois		–		7	–	4	–	0
Rutgers		–		7	–	4	–	0
No. 20 Georgia Tech		–		7	–	4	–	1
Air Force		–		6	–	4	–	0
Army		–		6	–	4	–	0
Virginia Tech		–		6	–	4	–	1
Houston		–		6	–	4	–	1
Tulane		–		6	–	5	–	0
Temple		–		5	–	4	–	0
Colgate		–		5	–	4	–	1
Holy Cross		–		5	–	4	–	1
Syracuse		–		5	–	6	–	0
Miami (FL)		–		5	–	6	–	0
Dayton		–		4	–	6	–	1
Boston College		–		4	–	7	–	0
Navy		–		4	–	7	–	0
South Carolina		–		4	–	7	–	0
Southern Miss		–		3	–	7	–	1
Xavier		–		3	–	8	–	0
Marshall		–		2	–	8	–	0
Cincinnati		–		2	–	9	–	0
Villanova		–		2	–	9	–	0
Pittsburgh		–		1	–	10	–	0
Rankings from AP Poll

The 1972 Notre Dame Fighting Irish football team was an American football team that represented the University of Notre Dame as an independent during the 1972 NCAA University Division football season. In their ninth year under head coach Ara Parseghian, the Irish compiled an 8–3 record, outscored opponents by a total of 283 to 152, and were ranked No. 14 in the final AP poll and No. 12 in the final UPI poll. In two games against ranked opponents, they lost to No. 1 USC and No. 9 Nebraska in the Orange Bowl.

Defensive tackle Greg Marx was a consensus first-team pick on the 1972 All-America college football team. The team's statistical leaders included quarterback Tom Clements (1,163 passing yards), Eric Penick (727 rushing yards), Willie Townsend (25 receptions for 369 yards), and Andy Huff (60 points scored).

The team played its home games at Notre Dame Stadium in Notre Dame, Indiana.

== Schedule ==
Date	Time	Opponent	Rank	Site	TV	Result	Attendance	Source
September 23	2:30 p.m.	at Northwestern	No. 13	Dyche Stadium; Evanston, IL (rivalry)		W 37–0	55,155	
September 30	2:30 p.m.	Purdue	No. 10	Notre Dame Stadium; Notre Dame, IN (rivalry)		W 35–14	59,075	
October 7	1:50 p.m.	at Michigan State	No. 7	Spartan Stadium; East Lansing, MI (rivalry)	ABC	W 16–0	77,828	
October 14	2:30 p.m.	Pittsburgh	No. 7	Notre Dame Stadium; Notre Dame, IN (rivalry)		W 42–16	59,075	
October 21	2:30 p.m.	Missouri	No. 8	Notre Dame Stadium; Notre Dame, IN		L 26–30	59,075	
October 28	2:30 p.m.	TCU	No. 13	Notre Dame Stadium; Notre Dame, IN		W 21–0	59,075	
November 4	1:30 p.m.	vs. Navy	No. 12	Veterans Stadium; Philadelphia, PA (rivalry)		W 42–23	43,089	
November 11	3:00 p.m.	at Air Force	No. 12	Falcon Stadium; Colorado Springs, CO (rivalry)		W 21–7	48,671	
November 18	1:30 p.m.	Miami (FL)	No. 10	Notre Dame Stadium; Notre Dame, IN (rivalry)		W 20–17	59,075	
December 2	4:00 p.m.	at No. 1 USC	No. 10	Los Angeles Memorial Coliseum; Los Angeles, CA (rivalry)	ABC	L 23–45	75,243	
January 1, 1973	8:00 p.m.	vs. No. 9 Nebraska	No. 12	Miami Orange Bowl; Miami, FL (Orange Bowl, rivalry)	NBC	L 6–40	80,010	
Rankings from AP Poll released prior to the game; All times are in Eastern time

== Game summaries ==
=== Northwestern ===
Team	1	2	3	4	Total
• Notre Dame	14	16	7	0	37
Northwestern	0	0	0	0	0

- Date: September 23
- Location: Dyche Stadium, Evanston, IL
- Game start: 1:30 pm CDT

=== Purdue ===
Team	1	2	3	4	Total
Purdue	0	0	0	14	14
• Notre Dame	14	7	14	0	35

- Date: September 30
- Location: Notre Dame Stadium, South Bend, IN
- Game start: 1:30 pm EST
- Game attendance: 59,075
- Referee: Jerry Markbreit

Scoring summary
1	ND	Mike Creaney 39-yard pass from Tom Clements (Thomas kick)	ND 7-0
1	ND	Eric Penick 14-yard run (Thomas kick)	ND 14-0
2	ND	Willie Townsend 62-yard pass from Tom Clements (Thomas kick)	ND 21-0
3	ND	John Cieszowski 1-yard run (Thomas kick)	ND 28-0
3	ND	Andy Huff 1-yard run (Thomas kick)	ND 35-0
4	PUR	Jack Spellman 24-yard run (Bobrowski to Sayers pass)	ND 35-8
4	PUR	Skip Peterson 1-yard run (pass failed)	ND 35-14

=== Michigan State ===
Team	1	2	3	4	Total
• Notre Dame	3	3	0	10	16
Michigan St.	0	0	0	0	0

- Date: October 7
- Location: Spartan Stadium, East Lansing, MI
- Game start: 12:50 pm EST
- Television network: ABC

=== Pittsburgh ===
Team	1	2	3	4	Total
Pittsburgh	0	0	8	8	16
• Notre Dame	7	7	7	21	42

- Date: October 14
- Location: Notre Dame Stadium • South Bend, Indiana
- Game start: 1:30 pm EST
- Game attendance: 59,075

Scoring summary
1	ND	Huff 1-yard run (Thomas kick)	Notre Dame 7-0
2	ND	Huff 4-yard run (Thomas kick)	Notre Dame 14-0
3	PITT	Janasek 3-yard pass from Hogan (Englert pass from Hogan)	Notre Dame 14-8
3	ND	Mahalic 54-yard interception return (Thomas kick)	Notre Dame 21-8
4	ND	Huff 4-yard run (Thomas kick)	Notre Dame 28-8
4	ND	Penick 2-yard run (Thomas kick)	Notre Dame 35-8
4	ND	Best 56-yard run (Thomas kick)	Notre Dame 42-8
4	PITT	Daniels 1-yard run (Daniels run)	Notre Dame 42-16

=== Missouri ===
Team	1	2	3	4	Total
• Missouri	7	14	6	3	30
Notre Dame	7	7	0	12	26

- Date: October 21
- Location: Notre Dame Stadium, Notre Dame, IN
- Game start: 1:30 p.m. EST
- Game attendance: 59,075
- Game weather: Rain, upper 40s
- Referee: Jerry Markbreit

=== TCU ===
Team	1	2	3	4	Total
TCU	0	0	0	0	0
• Notre Dame	0	7	7	7	21

- Date: October 28
- Location: Notre Dame Stadium, Notre Dame, IN
- Game start: 1:30 p.m. EST
- Game attendance: 59,075
- Game weather: Rain, mid-50s

=== Navy ===
Team	1	2	3	4	Total
• Notre Dame	14	21	0	7	42
Navy	0	0	7	16	23

- Date: November 4
- Location: Veterans Stadium, Philadelphia, PA
- Game start: 1:30 p.m. EST

=== Air Force ===
Team	1	2	3	4	Total
• Notre Dame	0	14	0	7	21
Air Force	0	0	7	0	7

- Date: November 11
- Location: Falcon Stadium, Colorado Springs, CO
- Game start: 1:00 pm MST
- Referee: Doug Reeves

=== Miami (FL) ===
Team	1	2	3	4	Total
Miami	3	0	0	14	17
• Notre Dame	13	0	7	0	20

- Date: November 18
- Location: Notre Dame Stadium, South Bend, IN
- Game start: 1:30 p.m. EST
- Game attendance: 59,075
- Game weather: Mid-30s

=== USC ===
Team	1	2	3	4	Total
Notre Dame	3	7	13	0	23
• USC	19	0	13	13	45

- Date: December 2
- Location: Los Angeles Memorial Coliseum
- Game start: 1:00 p.m. PST
- Game weather: 80 degrees, sunny
- TV announcers (ABC): Chris Schenkel, Bud Wilkinson

=== Orange Bowl vs. Nebraska ===
1973 Orange Bowl

Team	1	2	3	4	Total
• Nebraska	7	13	20	0	40
Notre Dame	0	0	0	6	6

- Date: January 1
- Location: Miami Orange Bowl
- Game start: 8:00 p.m. EST
- Game attendance: 80,010
- TV announcers (NBC): Jim Simpson, Kyle Rote

== Roster ==
1972 Notre Dame Fighting Irish football team roster
Players
Coaches
Offense

Pos.	#	Name	Class
QB	12	Frank Allocco	So
FB	23	Art Best	Fr
G	62	Tom Bolger	Jr
QB	8	Cliff Brown	Jr
FB	30	Wayne Bullock	So
TE	86	Dave Casper	Jr
QB	2	Tom Clements	So
WR	85	Peter Demmerle	So
G	72	Gerry DiNardo	So
RB	28	Gary Diminick	Jr
OT	69	Dennis Lozzi	Jr
G	56	Frank Pomarico	Jr
OT	71	Steve Sylvester	So
WR	80	Willie Townsend	Jr

Defense

Pos.	#	Name	Class
DT	79	Jay Achterhoff	Fr
CB	14	Reggie Barnett	So
LB	50	Greg Collins	So
DB		Mike Kemp	So
DT	70	Steve Niehaus	Fr
DT	60	Kevin Nosbusch	So
DHB	7	Tim Rudnick	Jr

Special teams

Pos.	#	Name	Class
K	98	Bob Thomas	Jr

Head coach

- Ara Parseghian

Coordinators/assistant coaches

- Tom Pagna

Legend

- (C) Team captain
- (S) Suspended
- (I) Ineligible
- Injured
- Redshirt

Roster
