= 1972 Northern Illinois Huskies football team =

American college football season

1972 Northern Illinois Huskies football
- Conference: Independent
- Record: 7–4
- Head coach: Jerry Ippoliti (2nd season)
- MVPs: Mark Kellar; Larry Clark
- Captains: Larry Clark; Terry Drugan
- Home stadium: Huskie Stadium

1972 NCAA University Division independents football records
	Conf.			Overall
Team	W	L	T	W		L		T
No. 10 Penn State		–		10	–	2	–	0
No. 14 Notre Dame		–		8	–	3	–	0
Utah State		–		8	–	3	–	0
West Virginia		–		8	–	4	–	0
Florida State		–		7	–	4	–	0
Northern Illinois		–		7	–	4	–	0
Rutgers		–		7	–	4	–	0
No. 20 Georgia Tech		–		7	–	4	–	1
Air Force		–		6	–	4	–	0
Army		–		6	–	4	–	0
Virginia Tech		–		6	–	4	–	1
Houston		–		6	–	4	–	1
Tulane		–		6	–	5	–	0
Temple		–		5	–	4	–	0
Colgate		–		5	–	4	–	1
Holy Cross		–		5	–	4	–	1
Syracuse		–		5	–	6	–	0
Miami (FL)		–		5	–	6	–	0
Dayton		–		4	–	6	–	1
Boston College		–		4	–	7	–	0
Navy		–		4	–	7	–	0
South Carolina		–		4	–	7	–	0
Southern Miss		–		3	–	7	–	1
Xavier		–		3	–	8	–	0
Marshall		–		2	–	8	–	0
Cincinnati		–		2	–	9	–	0
Villanova		–		2	–	9	–	0
Pittsburgh		–		1	–	10	–	0
Rankings from AP Poll

The 1972 Northern Illinois Huskies football team represented Northern Illinois University as an independent during the 1972 NCAA University Division football season. Led by second-year head coach Jerry Ippoliti, the Huskies compiled a record of 7–4. Northern Illinois played home games at Huskie Stadium in DeKalb, Illinois.

== Schedule ==
Date	Time	Opponent	Site	Result	Attendance	Source
September 9	1:30 p.m.	Illinois State	Huskie Stadium; DeKalb, IL	W 21–7	13,887	
September 16	1:30 p.m.	at Wisconsin	Camp Randall Stadium; Madison, WI	L 7–31	62,710	
September 23	1:30 p.m.	Western Michigan	Huskie Stadium; DeKalb, IL	L 10–14	7,066	
September 30	12:30 p.m.	at Marshall	Fairfield Stadium; Huntington, WV	W 24–7	11,350	
October 7	1:30 p.m.	Xavier	Huskie Stadium; DeKalb, IL	W 20–7	6,282	
October 14	3:30 p.m.	at Idaho	Idaho Stadium; Moscow, ID	L 13–31	7,000	
October 21	1:30 p.m.	West Texas State	Huskie Stadium; DeKalb, IL	W 17–8	2,480	
October 28	1:30 p.m.	Kent State	Huskie Stadium; DeKalb, IL	W 28–7	12,126	
November 4	6:30 p.m.	at Toledo	Glass Bowl; Toledo, OH	W 30–7	12,741	
November 11	1:30 p.m.	Fresno State	Huskie Stadium; DeKalb, IL	L 6–9	6,696	
November 17	10:00 p.m.	at Long Beach State	Anaheim Stadium; Anaheim, CA	W 22–13	2,552–4,000	
All times are in Central time
