= 1972 Bowling Green Falcons football team =

American college football season

1972 Bowling Green Falcons football
- Conference: Mid-American Conference
- Record: 6–3–1 (3–1–1 MAC)
- Head coach: Don Nehlen (5th season)
- Defensive coordinator: Gary Tranquill (2nd season)
- Home stadium: Doyt Perry Stadium

1972 Mid-American Conference football standings
	Conf.					Overall
Team	W		L		T	W		L		T
Kent State $	4	–	1	–	0	6	–	5	–	1
Bowling Green	3	–	1	–	1	6	–	3	–	1
Western Michigan	2	–	2	–	1	7	–	3	–	1
Miami (OH)	2	–	3	–	0	7	–	3	–	0
Toledo	2	–	3	–	0	6	–	5	–	0
Ohio	1	–	4	–	0	3	–	8	–	0
$ – Conference champion

The 1972 Bowling Green Falcons football team was an American football team that represented Bowling Green University in the Mid-American Conference (MAC) during the 1972 NCAA University Division football season. In their fifth season under head coach Don Nehlen, the Falcons compiled a 6–3–1 record (3–1–1 against MAC opponents) and outscored their opponents by a combined total of 184 to 127.

The team's statistical leaders included Reid Lamport and Joe Babics, each with 430 passing yards, Paul Miles with 1,024 rushing yards, and Roger Wallace with 242 receiving yards.

== Schedule ==
Date	Time	Opponent	Site	Result	Attendance	Source
September 16	1:30 p.m.	at No. 18 Purdue*	Ross–Ade Stadium; West Lafayette, IN	W 17–14	51,859	
September 23		at Miami (OH)	Miami Field; Oxford, OH	W 16–7	11,518	
September 30	1:30 p.m.	at Western Michigan	Waldo Stadium; Kalamazoo, MI	T 13–13	17,850	
October 7	7:30 p.m.	at Toledo	Glass Bowl; Toledo, OH (rivalry)	W 19–8	22,109	
October 14	1:30 p.m.	Kent State	Doyt L. Perry Stadium; Bowling Green, OH (rivalry)	L 10–14	20,507	
October 21		at San Diego State*	San Diego Stadium; San Diego, CA	L 19–35	36,121	
October 28	1:30 p.m.	Marshall*	Doyt L. Perry Stadium; Bowling Green, OH	W 46–7	14,156	
November 4	1:30 p.m.	Ohio	Doyt Perry Stadium; Bowling Green, OH	W 17–0	17,867	
November 11	1:30 p.m.	Dayton*	Doyt Perry Stadium; Bowling Green, OH	W 17–0	11,729	
November 18	8:00 p.m.	at Tampa*	Tampa Stadium; Tampa, FL	L 22–29	15,111	
*Non-conference game; Rankings from AP Poll released prior to the game; All times are in Eastern time
