= Bill Fulcher =

American football player and coach (1934–2022)

- Fulcher at Georgia Tech, c. 1966

Biographical details
- Born: February 9, 1934; Augusta, Georgia, U.S.
- Died: September 23, 2022 (aged 88); Augusta, Georgia, U.S.

Playing career
- 1953–1955: Georgia Tech
- 1956–1958: Washington Redskins
- Positions: Linebacker, guard

Coaching career (HC unless noted)
- 1960–1961: Screven County HS (GA)
- 1962: Richmond Academy (GA)
- 1963: Georgia Tech (freshman)
- 1964–1965: Waynesboro HS (VA)
- 1966: Georgia Tech (LB/DE)
- 1969: Georgia Tech (OL)
- 1970: Florida (OL)
- 1971: Tampa
- 1972–1973: Georgia Tech

Head coaching record
- Overall: 18–15–1 (college)
- Bowls: 1–0

William Marcus Fulcher (February 9, 1934 – September 23, 2022) was an American professional football player and college coach. He played college football at the Georgia Institute of Technology and then played pro ball for the Washington Redskins in the National Football League (NFL). Fulcher served as head football coach at the University of Tampa in 1971 and at his alma mater, Georgia Tech, in 1972 and 1973, compiling a career college football record of 18–15–1.

== Football career ==
Fulcher was born on February 9, 1934, at University Hospital in Augusta, Georgia, and he attended the Academy of Richmond County, where he played football, baseball, and basketball. He also played football for one year at the Darlington School in Rome, Georgia. Fulcher enrolled at Georgia Institute of Technology, where he played college football for the Georgia Tech Yellow Jackets as a walk-on. He became a starting guard for the Yellow Jackets. Fulcher was not selected in the 1956 NFL draft, and he signed with the Washington Redskins as a free agent in May 1956 to play as a linebacker. Fulcher retired from the NFL after one season to coach high school football, but returned in December 1957 due to a season-ending injury to Tom Braatz.

After the 1958 season, Fulcher became the head coach of the football team at Screven County High School in Sylvania, Georgia, going 15–6–1. He next coached at Richmond, and then in 1963 became the freshman coach for Georgia Tech. He coached at Waynesboro High School in 1964 and 1965, returned to Georgia Tech to coach linebackers and defensive ends in 1966, and then spent 1967 and 1968 in business. In 1969, Fulcher returned to Georgia Tech as an aide, and then he was an assistant coach at the University of Florida in 1970.

Fulcher was hired to be the head coach for the Tampa Spartans of the University of Tampa in 1971. He led the Spartans to a 6–5 record in the 1971 season. Fulcher accepted the head coaching position with Georgia Tech in January 1972, resigning his position with Tampa after one year. In Fulcher's first season with Georgia Tech, the team had a 7–4–1 record in the 1972 season, and defeated the Iowa State Cyclones in the 1972 Liberty Bowl. The team finished ranked No. 20 by the Associated Press poll. After the 1973 season, Fulcher resigned, saying that coaching was no longer enjoyable for him. He left Georgia Tech with a 12–10–1 record.

In 2015, Fulcher was inducted to the Georgia Sports Hall of Fame.

== Later career ==
After leaving Georgia Tech, Fulcher sold real estate in Atlanta. He attended Augusta Law School and graduated in 1980. He later moved to Tampa to open a restaurant and then sold insurance, before returning to Augusta to sell real estate.

== Personal life ==
Fulcher and his wife, Bequi, had five children. He died on September 23, 2022, at age 88.

== Head coaching record ==
=== College ===
Year	Team	Overall	Conference	Standing	Bowl/playoffs	Coaches^{#}	AP^{°}
Tampa Spartans (NCAA College Division independent) (1971)
1971	Tampa	6–5					
Tampa:		6–5					
Georgia Tech Yellow Jackets (NCAA University Division / Division I independent) (1972–1973)
1972	Georgia Tech	7–4–1			W Liberty		20
1973	Georgia Tech	5–6					
Georgia Tech:		12–10–1					
Total:		18–15–1					
^{#}Rankings from final Coaches Poll.; ^{°}Rankings from final AP Poll.
