= List of Missouri Tigers head football coaches =

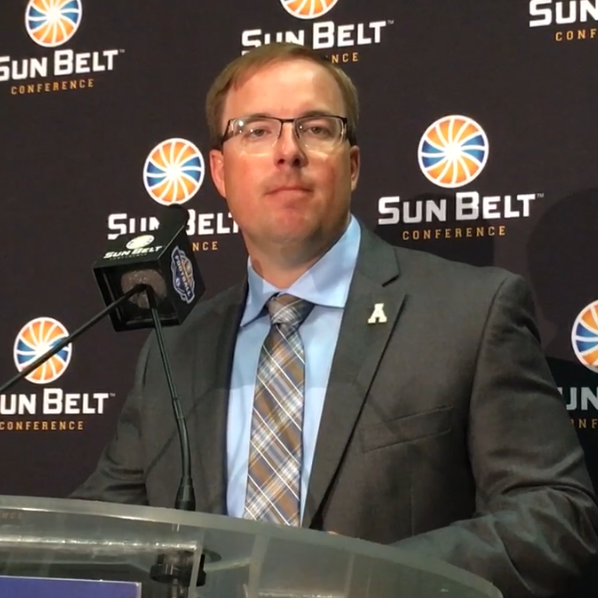
Eliah Drinkwitz, current head coach of the University of Missouri Tigers.

The Missouri Tigers football program is a college football team that represents the University of Missouri in the East Division of the Southeastern Conference (SEC) in the National Collegiate Athletic Association (NCAA). The team has had 31 head coaches since it started playing organized football in 1890 with the nickname Tigers. Missouri joined the Western Interstate University Football Association in December 1891, later winning the conference championship three years in a row. The conference disbanded after the 1897 season and Missouri remained independent until joining the Missouri Valley Intercollegiate Athletic Association in 1907. After several changes, the conference eventually became the Big Eight Conference. The Tigers became a charter member of the Big 12 in 1996 when the Big Eight disbanded. Missouri subsequently left the Big 12 following the 2011 season and joined as the 14th member of the SEC effective for the 2012 season. The Tigers have played 1,180 games during their 119 seasons. In those seasons, nine coaches have led Missouri to postseason bowl games: Don Faurot, Chauncey Simpson, Dan Devine, Al Onofrio, Warren Powers, Larry Smith, Gary Pinkel, Barry Odom, and Drinkwitz. Nine coaches have also won conference championships with the Tigers: Harry Orman Robinson, C. D. Bliss, Bill Roper, Chester Brewer, John F. Miller, Gwinn Henry, Faurot, Simpson and Devine.

Faurot is the all-time leader in games coached (190) and years coached (19). Gary Pinkel is the all-time leader in wins (119). Roper has the highest winning percentage of any coach, with a percentage of .938 during his one year. Of coaches who served more than one season, James Phelan leads with a .813 winning percentage. Frank Carideo is, in terms of winning percentage, the worst coach the Tigers have had (.111). Onofrio and Smith have both been awarded coach of the year honors in their conference by the Associated Press. Of the 31 Tigers coaches, six have been inducted into the College Football Hall of Fame: Roper, Phelan, Faurot, Frank Broyles, Devine, and Pinkel. The current head coach is Eliah Drinkwitz.

== Key ==
Key to symbols in coaches list
General		Overall		Conference		Postseason (Note: Although the first Rose Bowl Game was played in 1902, it has been continuously played since the 1916 game, and is recognized as the oldest bowl game by the NCAA. "—" indicates any season prior to 1916 when postseason games were not played.)	
No.	Order of coaches (Note: A running total of the number of head coaches, with coaches who served separate tenures being counted only once. Interim head coaches are represented with "Int" and are not counted in the running total. "—" indicates the team played but either without a coach or no coach is on record. "X" indicates an interim year without play.)	GC	Games coached	CW	Conference wins	PW	Postseason wins
DC	Division championships	OW	Overall wins	CL	Conference losses	PL	Postseason losses
CC	Conference championships	OL	Overall losses	CT	Conference ties	PT	Postseason ties
NC	National championships	OT	Overall ties (Note: Overtime rules in college football were introduced in 1996, making ties impossible in the period since.)	C%	Conference winning percentage		
†	Elected to the College Football Hall of Fame	O%	Overall winning percentage (Note: When computing the win–loss percentage, a tie counts as half a win and half a loss.)				

== Coaches ==
List of head football coaches showing season(s) coached, overall records, conference records, postseason records, championships and selected awards (Note: Statistics correct as of the end of the 2025 NCAA Division I FBS football season.)
No.	Name	Term	Season(s)	GC	OW	OL	OT	O%	CW	CL	CT	C%	PW	PL	CC (Note: Missouri was not in an athletic conference from 1890 through 1891 and 1898 through 1907.)	Awards
1	A. L. McRae	1890	1	3	2	1	0	.667	—	—	—	—	—	—	—	—
2	Hal Reid	1891	1	4	3	1	0	.750	—	—	—	—	—	—	—	—
3	E. H. Jones	1892	1	3	1	2	0	.333	1	2	0	0.333	—	—	—	—
4	Harry Orman Robinson	1893–1894	2	14	8	6	0	.571	4	2	0	0.667	—	—	2	—
5	C. D. Bliss	1895	1	8	7	1	0	.875	2	1	0	0.667	—	—	1	—
6	Frank Patterson	1896	1	12	7	5	0	.583	0	3	0	.000	—	—	—	—
7	Charles Young	1897	1	11	5	6	0	.455	0	2	0	.000	—	—	—	—
8	Dave Fultz	1898–1899	2	17	10	6	1	.618	—	—	—	—	—	—	—	—
9	Fred W. Murphy	1900–1901	2	18	6	10	2	.389	—	—	—	—	—	—	—	—
10	Pat O'Dea	1902	1	8	5	3	0	.625	—	—	—	—	—	—	—	—
11	John McLean	1903–1905	3	27	9	17	1	.352	—	—	—	—	—	—	—	—
12	W. J. Monilaw	1906–1908	3	25	18	6	1	.740	4	4	0	0.500	—	—	—	—
13	Bill Roper^{†}	1909	1	8	7	0	1	.938	4	0	1	0.900	—	—	1	—
14	Bill Hollenback	1910	1	8	4	2	2	.625	2	1	1	0.625	—	—	—	—
15	Chester Brewer	1911–1913	3	24	14	8	2	.625	6	5	2	0.538	—	—	1	—
16	Henry Schulte	1914–1917	4	32	16	14	2	.531	10	9	2	0.524	—	—	—	—
17	John F. Miller	1919	1	8	5	1	2	.750	4	0	1	0.900	—	—	1	—
18	James Phelan^{†}	1920–1921	2	16	13	3	0	.813	9	3	0	0.750	—	—	—	—
19	Thomas Kelley	1922	1	8	5	3	0	.625	4	3	0	0.571	—	—	—	—
20	Gwinn Henry	1923–1931	9	77	40	28	9	.578	28	16	5	0.622	—	—	3	—
21	Frank Carideo	1932–1934	3	27	2	23	2	.111	1	13	1	0.100	—	—	—	—
22	Don Faurot^{†}	1935–1942, 1946–1956	8, 11	190	101	79	10	.558	61	34	9	0.630	0	4	3	—
23	Chauncey Simpson	1943–1945	3	28	12	14	2	.464	10	3	2	0.733	0	1	1	—
24	Frank Broyles^{†}	1957	1	10	5	4	1	.550	3	3	0	0.500	—	—	—	—
25	Dan Devine^{†}	1958–1970	13	137	93	37	7	.704	62	23	3	0.722	4	2	2	—
26	Al Onofrio	1971–1977	7	79	38	41	0	.481	21	28	0	0.429	1	1	—	Big Eight AP Coach of the Year (1972)
27	Warren Powers	1978–1984	7	82	46	33	3	.579	24	22	3	0.520	3	2	—	—
28	Woody Widenhofer	1985–1988	4	44	12	31	1	.284	7	14	0	0.333	—	—	—	—
29	Bob Stull	1989–1993	5	55	15	38	2	.291	8	27	0	0.229	—	—	—	—
30	Larry Smith	1994–2000	7	80	33	46	1	.419	19	25	0	0.432	1	1	—	Big 12 AP Coach of the Year (1997)
31	Gary Pinkel^{†}	2001–2015	15	188	117	71	—	.622	64	55	—	0.538	6	4	—	National Coach of the Year (2007)
32	Barry Odom	2016–2019	4	50	25	25	—	.500	13	19	—	0.406	0	2	—	—
33	Eliah Drinkwitz	2020–Present	6	75	46	29	—	0.613	26	24	—	0.520	2	3	—	AP SEC Coach of the Year (2023)
