= Bernie Galiffa =

American football player

Profile
- Position: Quarterback

Personal information
- Born: October 28, 1950; Donora, Pennsylvania, U.S.
- Died: March 27, 2014 (aged 63)
- Listed height: 5 ft 11 in (1.80 m)
- Listed weight: 190 lb (86 kg)

Career information
- College: West Virginia (1970–1972)

Bernard Galiffa (October 28, 1950 – March 27, 2014) was an American football quarterback. He played college football for the West Virginia Mountaineers from 1970 to 1972. He was the first West Virginia player to tally 2,000 yards in a season, and he set school records for touchdown passes in a season (16), total offensive yards in a season (2,173), offensive plays in a season (359), and passes attempted in a season (302). His head coach Bobby Bowden said of Galiffa, "He's as pretty a passer as I've ever seen. He's got the most beautiful release and body control I've seen." As a senior in 1972, Galiffa ranked among the leading quarterbacks in major-college football with 2,302 passing yards (4th), 209.3 yards gained per game (4th), 2,163 total yards (6th), 16 passing touchdowns (6th), and 15.6 passing yards per completion (9th). He later lived in Wheeling, West Virginia, where he had a career in automobile sales. In retirement, he lived in Wilmington, North Carolina. He died in March 2014.
