= 1972 Toledo Rockets football team =

American college football season

1972 Toledo Rockets football
- Conference: Mid-American Conference
- Record: 6–5 (2–3 MAC)
- Head coach: Jack Murphy (2nd season)
- Defensive coordinator: Dick Strahm (3rd season)
- Home stadium: Glass Bowl

1972 Mid-American Conference football standings
	Conf.					Overall
Team	W		L		T	W		L		T
Kent State $	4	–	1	–	0	6	–	5	–	1
Bowling Green	3	–	1	–	1	6	–	3	–	1
Western Michigan	2	–	2	–	1	7	–	3	–	1
Miami (OH)	2	–	3	–	0	7	–	3	–	0
Toledo	2	–	3	–	0	6	–	5	–	0
Ohio	1	–	4	–	0	3	–	8	–	0
$ – Conference champion

The 1972 Toledo Rockets football team was an American football team that represented the University of Toledo in the Mid-American Conference (MAC) during the 1972 NCAA University Division football season. In their second season under head coach Jack Murphy, the Rockets compiled a 6–5 record (2–3 against MAC opponents), finished in a tie for fourth place in the MAC, and were outscored by all opponents by a combined total of 210 to 196.

== Schedule ==
Date	Time	Opponent	Site	Result	Attendance	Source
September 9	8:11 p.m.	at Tampa*	Tampa Stadium; Tampa, FL	L 0–21	23,806	
September 16	1:30 p.m.	at Eastern Michigan*	Rynearson Stadium; Ypsilanti, MI	W 16–0	16,300	
September 23	7:30 p.m.	UT Arlington*	Glass Bowl; Toledo, OH	W 38–24	17,128	
September 30	1:30 p.m.	at Ohio	Peden Stadium; Athens, OH	L 22–38	15,021	
October 7	7:30 p.m.	Bowling Green	Glass Bowl; Toledo, OH (rivalry)	L 8–19	22,109	
October 14	1:30 p.m.	at Western Michigan	Waldo Stadium; Kalamazoo, MI	W 20–13	19,000	
October 21	1:30 p.m.	at Dayton*	Baujan Field; Dayton, OH	W 20–17	6,130	
October 28	1:30 p.m.	Miami (OH)	Glass Bowl; Toledo, OH	W 35–7	14,281	
November 4	7:30 p.m.	Northern Illinois*	Glass Bowl; Toledo, OH	L 7–30	12,741	
November 11	7:30 p.m.	Marshall*	Glass Bowl; Toledo, OH	W 21–0	12,102	
November 18	1:30 p.m.	at Kent State	Dix Stadium; Kent, OH	L 9–27	20,715	
*Non-conference game; All times are in Eastern time

== After the season ==
=== NFL draft ===
The following Rocket was selected in the 1973 NFL draft following the season.

Round	Pick	Player	Position	NFL club
14	350	Joe Schwartz	Running back	New York Jets
