= 1972 Kent State Golden Flashes football team =

American college football season

1972 Kent State Golden Flashes football

MAC champion

Tangerine Bowl, L 18–21 vs. Tampa
- Conference: Mid-American Conference
- Record: 6–5–1 (4–1 MAC)
- Head coach: Don James (2nd season)
- Offensive coordinator: Dick Scesniak (2nd season)
- Defensive coordinator: Dennis Fitzgerald (2nd season)
- Home stadium: Dix Stadium

1972 Mid-American Conference football standings
	Conf.					Overall
Team	W		L		T	W		L		T
Kent State $	4	–	1	–	0	6	–	5	–	1
Bowling Green	3	–	1	–	1	6	–	3	–	1
Western Michigan	2	–	2	–	1	7	–	3	–	1
Miami (OH)	2	–	3	–	0	7	–	3	–	0
Toledo	2	–	3	–	0	6	–	5	–	0
Ohio	1	–	4	–	0	3	–	8	–	0
$ – Conference champion

The 1972 Kent State Golden Flashes football team represented Kent State University in the 1972 NCAA University Division football season. The Golden Flashes offense scored 191 points while the defense allowed 196 points. Led by head coach Don James, the Golden Flashes participated in the Tangerine Bowl. Future college head coaches Nick Saban (Alabama) and Gary Pinkel (Missouri) played on the team, along with future Pittsburgh Steelers and Pro Football Hall of Fame linebacker Jack Lambert.

== Schedule ==
Date	Time	Opponent	Site	Result	Attendance	Source
September 9	7:30 p.m.	at Akron*	Rubber Bowl; Akron, OH (Wagon Wheel)	T 13–13	25,131	
September 16	8:00 p.m.	at Louisville*	Fairgrounds Stadium; Louisville, KY	L 0–34	20,122	
September 23	1:30 p.m.	Ohio	Dix Stadium; Kent, OH	W 37–14	8,215	
September 30	1:30 p.m.	San Diego State*	Dix Stadium; Kent, OH	L 0–14	5,415–5,421	
October 7	1:30 p.m.	Western Michigan	Dix Stadium; Kent, OH	L 12–13	7,738	
October 14	1:30 p.m.	at Bowling Green	Doyt Perry Stadium; Bowling Green, OH (rivalry)	W 14–10	20,507	
October 21	1:30 p.m.	Xavier*	Dix Stadium; Kent, OH	W 26–16	15,487–15,497	
October 28	2:30 p.m.	at Northern Illinois*	Huskie Stadium; DeKalb, IL	L 7–28	12,126	
November 4	1:30 p.m.	at Marshall*	Fairfield Stadium; Huntington, WV	W 16–14	12,425	
November 11		at Miami (OH)	Miami Field; Oxford, OH	W 21–10	7,165	
November 18	1:30 p.m.	Toledo	Dix Stadium; Kent, OH	W 27–9	20,715	
December 29		vs. Tampa	Tangerine Bowl; Orlando, FL (Tangerine Bowl)	L 18–21	20,062	
*Non-conference game; All times are in Eastern time

== Kent State players in the NFL ==
- Linebacker Jack Lambert went on to a career in the National Football League with the Pittsburgh Steelers. Running Back Larry Poole also played a number of years in the NFL with Cleveland Browns, Cincinnati Bengals and Houston.
