= 1973–74 NCAA football bowl games =

Series of post-season NCAA football games

- Season: 1973
- Number of bowls: 11
- Bowl games: December 17, 1973 – January 1, 1974
- National Championship: 1973 Sugar Bowl
- Location of Championship: Tulane Stadium, New Orleans, Louisiana
- Champions: Notre Dame
Bowl record by conference
| Conference | Bowls | Record | Final AP poll |

The 1973–74 NCAA football bowl games were a series of post-season games played in December 1973 and January 1974 to end the 1973 NCAA Division I football season. A total of 11 team-competitive games were played. The post-season began with the Liberty Bowl on December 17, 1973, and concluded on January 1, 1974, with the Orange Bowl.

== Schedule ==
| Date | Game | Site | TV | Teams | Results |
|---|---|---|---|---|---|
| Dec. 17 | Liberty Bowl | Memphis Memorial Stadium; Memphis, Tennessee | ABC | No. 16 NC State (8–3); No. 19 Kansas (7–3–1) | NC State 31; Kansas 18 |
| Dec. 21 | Fiesta Bowl | Sun Devil Stadium; Tempe, Arizona | Mizlou | No. 10 Arizona State (10–1); Pittsburgh (6–4–1) | Arizona State 28; Pittsburgh 7 |
| Dec. 22 | Tangerine Bowl | Tangerine Bowl; Orlando, Florida | Mizlou | No. 15 Miami (OH) (10–0); Florida (7–4) | Miami OH 16; Florida 7 |
| Dec. 28 | Peach Bowl | Fulton County Stadium; Atlanta, Georgia | Mizlou | Georgia (6–4–1); No. 18 Maryland (8–3) | Georgia 17; Maryland 16 |
| Dec. 29 | Sun Bowl | Sun Bowl; El Paso, Texas | CBS | Missouri (7–4); Auburn (6–5) | Missouri 34; Auburn 17 |
| Dec. 29 | Astro-Bluebonnet Bowl | Astrodome; Houston, Texas | ABC | No. 14 Houston (10–1); No. 17 Tulane (9–2) | Houston 47; Tulane 7 |
| Dec. 29 | Gator Bowl | Gator Bowl Stadium; Jacksonville, Florida | ABC | No. 11 Texas Tech (10–1); No. 20 Tennessee (8–3) | Texas Tech 28; Tennessee 19 |
| Dec. 31 | Sugar Bowl | Tulane Stadium; New Orleans, Louisiana | ABC | No. 3 Notre Dame (10–0); No. 1 Alabama (11–0) | Notre Dame 24; Alabama 23 |
| Jan. 1 | Cotton Bowl Classic | Cotton Bowl; Dallas, Texas | CBS | No. 12 Nebraska (8–2–1); No. 8 Texas (8–2) | Nebraska 19; Texas 3 |
| Jan. 1 | Rose Bowl | Rose Bowl; Pasadena, California | NBC | No. 4 Ohio State (9–0–1); No. 7 USC (9–1–1) | Ohio State 42; USC 21 |
| Jan. 1 | Orange Bowl | Miami Orange Bowl; Miami, Florida | NBC | No. 6 Penn State (11–0); No. 13 LSU (9–2) | Penn State 16; LSU 9 |

Rankings from AP Poll
