= Bob Tyler =

American football coach (1932–2024)

Biographical details
- Born: July 4, 1932; Water Valley, Mississippi, U.S.
- Died: April 28, 2024 (aged 91); Water Valley, Mississippi, U.S.

Coaching career (HC unless noted)
- 1966–1967: Meridian HS (MS)
- 1968–1970: Ole Miss (assistant)
- 1971: Alabama (assistant)
- 1972: Mississippi State (OC)
- 1973–1978: Mississippi State
- 1981: North Texas
- 2000–2002: Millsaps

Administrative career (AD unless noted)
- 1976–1979: Mississippi State
- 1981–1982: North Texas

Head coaching record
- Overall: 37–68–2 (college); 94–19–6 (high school)
- Bowls: 1–0

Bobby Hoyt Tyler (July 4, 1932 – April 28, 2024) was an American college football coach. He began his career as a high school coach.

== Life and career ==
Born in Water Valley, Mississippi, Tyler was a star athlete at Water Valley High School before entering military service. Following his term of duty at Ft. Bragg, North Carolina, Tyler earned his college degrees at the University of Mississippi. He began coaching in 1955 at Water Valley High and later coached football at Okolona, Senatobia, Meridian, and Corinth. His high-school teams played in 119 games and achieved a record of 94–19–6.

Tyler continued his career in the collegiate ranks, as receivers coach on Johnny Vaught's Ole Miss Rebel staff. He later worked as an assistant under Bear Bryant at the University of Alabama before moving to Mississippi State as offensive coordinator.

Tyler was named head coach of the Bulldogs in 1973 and led State to a 9–3 season in the tough Southeastern Conference and a victory in the 1974 Sun Bowl over North Carolina. During that season, his team beat perennial powerhouses in Georgia, and LSU. The Bulldogs' record was 6–4–1 in 1975, and it was an impressive 9–2 in 1976, ending the season ranked #20 in the AP Poll. His team compiled a 5–6 record in 1977, and he went 6–5 in his final season with the Bulldogs.

Mississippi State was placed on probation by the NCAA prior to the 1975 season due to alleged improper benefits to student athletes. The school sought and won court approval to play in an adverse legal opinion to the NCAA. Regardless and after the fact, the NCAA forced the school to forfeit four wins and one tie 1975, as well as the entire 1976 and 1977 seasons. Tyler was removed as athletic director in January 1979, which led him to step down as football coach.

In 1981, Tyler coached at North Texas State University (now University of North Texas), where he went 2–9 in his only season there. Tyler then went on to coach at Northwest Mississippi Community College and Oxford High School in the 1980s. He was named Director of Mississippi State Parks, Wildlife and Fisheries and served in that capacity from 1992 to 1996. He also served as head coach of Millsaps Majors from 2000 until his retirement in 2002. His later-life hobbies include attending antique fairs regionally with his wife, Dale.

Tyler was recipient of numerous Coach of the Year awards on the high school and college levels. He also served as assistant and head coach of the Mississippi High School All-Star football games in 1966 and 1967. He died at his home in Water Valley on April 28, 2024, at the age of 91.

== Head coaching record ==
=== College ===
Year	Team	Overall	Conference	Standing	Bowl/playoffs	Coaches^{#}	AP^{°}
Mississippi State Bulldogs (Southeastern Conference) (1973–1978)
1973	Mississippi State	4–5–2	2–5	T–8th			
1974	Mississippi State	9–3	3–3	T–4th	W Sun	17	17
1975	Mississippi State	2–9+	0–6+	T–9th			
1976	Mississippi State	0–11++	0–6++	T–9th			20
1977	Mississippi State	0–11+++	0–6+++	T–9th			
1978	Mississippi State	6–5	2–4	T–7th			
Mississippi State:		21–44–2^	7–30^				
North Texas State Mean Green (NCAA Division I-A independent) (1981)
1981	North Texas State	2–9					
North Texas State:		2–9					
Millsaps Majors (Southern Collegiate Athletic Conference) (2000–2002)
2000	Millsaps	5–5	2–4	6th			
2001	Millsaps	6–4	3–3	4th			
2002	Millsaps	3–6	1–5	T–6th			
Millsaps:		14–15	6–12				
Total:		37–68–2					
^{#}Rankings from final Coaches Poll.; ^{°}Rankings from final AP Poll.

+ The 1975 team finished with a record of 6–4–1 (1–4–1 SEC) before NCAA probation
++ The 1976 team finished with a record of 9–2 (4–2 SEC) before NCAA probation
+++ The 1977 team finished with a record of 5–6 (2–4 SEC) before NCAA probation
^ Adjusted from 39–25–3 (14–22–1 SEC) by the NCAA
