= 1974 Orange Bowl =

American college football game

- 40th Orange Bowl
- The Miami Orange Bowl in Miami, Florida, hosted the Orange Bowl.
Penn State Nittany Lions	LSU Tigers
(11–0)	(9–2)
Independent	SEC
16	9
Head coach: Joe Paterno	Head coach: Charles McClendon
AP / Coaches; 6 / 5	AP / Coaches; 13 / 14
	1	2	3	4	Total
Penn State	3	13	0	0	16
LSU	7	0	2	0	9
- Date: January 1, 1974
- Season: 1973
- Stadium: Orange Bowl
- Location: Miami, Florida
- MVP: Tom Shuman (Penn State QB); Randy Crowder (Penn State DT)
- Favorite: Penn State by 5 points
- Referee: James M. Artley (SEC) (split crew: SEC and ECAC)
- Attendance: 60,477

United States TV coverage
- Network: NBC
- Announcers: Jim Simpson, Kyle Rote
- Nielsen ratings: 24.3

The 1974 Orange Bowl was the 40th edition of the college football bowl game, played at the Orange Bowl in Miami, Florida, on Tuesday, January 1. The final game of the 1973–74 bowl season, it matched the sixth-ranked independent Penn State Nittany Lions and the #13 LSU Tigers of the Southeastern Conference (SEC).

Favored Penn State took the lead in the first half and won, 16–9.

== Teams ==
=== Penn State ===
Penn State completed its third perfect regular season since 1968, and had their first Heisman Trophy winner, running back John Cappelletti. The Nittany Lions were aiming to end 1973 the same way they did 1968 and 1969, by winning in Miami. The Lions nipped Kansas 15–14 in the 1969 Orange Bowl and stymied Missouri 10–3 the next year.

=== LSU ===
The Tigers opened with nine wins and were heading to a SEC title, but lost at home on Thanksgiving to Alabama. A loss at Tulane the following week, the first victory for the Green Wave over the Tigers since 1948 (LSU was 22–0–2 vs. its in-state rival in between), only added to the frustration in Baton Rouge.

LSU's most recent appearance at the Orange Bowl was three years earlier, a 17–12 loss to national champion Nebraska. The Tigers' previous Orange Bowl win was in January 1962, 25–7 over Colorado in the final game for Paul Dietzel as LSU head coach.

== Game summary ==
Steve Rogers gave LSU an early lead on his touchdown run, but Penn State responded with a field goal by Chris Bahr by the end of the first quarter to make it 7–3. Early in the second quarter, Chuck Herd caught a 72-yard touchdown pass from Tom Shuman to give the Nittany Lions a lead they did not relinquish; John Cappelletti scored from a yard out to extend the lead to 16–7, the score at halftime.

The only scoring in the second half came on a safety when Penn State punter Brian Masella chased down and fell on a poor snap in the third quarter; the Tigers could not muster up points despite out-gaining the Nittany Lions by over ninety yards.

The game's halftime show was a musical salute to Walt Disney Productions' fiftieth anniversary, and served as the conclusion to the company's year-long "50 Happy Years" promotion.

=== Scoring ===
First quarter

- LSU – Steve Rogers 3-yard run (Jackson kick)
- Penn State – Chris Bahr 44-yard field goal

Second quarter

- Penn State – Chuck Herd 72-yard pass from Tom Shuman (C.Bahr kick)
- Penn State – John Cappelletti 1-yard run (kick failed)

Third quarter

- LSU – Team safety, Brian Masella downed in end zone

Fourth quarter
No scoring

== Statistics ==
Statistics	Penn State	LSU
First downs	9	18
Rushes–yards	43–28	57–205
Passing yards	157	69
Passes (C–A–I)	6–17–1	8–20–1
Total Offense	60–185	77–274
Punts–average	7–34.7	8–46.8
Fumbles–lost	1–0	3–1
Turnovers	1	2
Penalties–yards	3–37	3–30

== Aftermath ==
The Tigers did not finish higher than third in the SEC until 1982, which resulted in them gaining smaller bowl invites during that time. LSU stumbled to 5–5–1 in 1974 and 4–7 in 1975, its only non-winning seasons during Charles McClendon's 18-year tenure in Baton Rouge (1962–79).

LSU has played in the Orange Bowl only once since, losing 21–20 to Nebraska in 1983, the Tigers' second loss to the Cornhuskers in the Orange Bowl, and the first of three losses in major bowl games between the teams over five seasons (Sugar Bowl in January 1985 and 1987).

With the win, the Nittany Lions were 12–0 and had their third undefeated season in six years. However, they finished fifth in the final Associated Press poll behind Notre Dame, Oklahoma, Ohio State, and Alabama.

Penn State's next appearance in the Orange Bowl was in 1986, when the top-ranked Nittany Lions lost 25–10 to #3 Oklahoma, costing Penn State the national championship and allowing the Sooners to finish first in the polls.

LSU and Penn State did not meet again until the 2010 Capital One Bowl, won by the Nittany Lions, 19–17 in what turned out to be Paterno's last bowl victory. He was fired in November 2011, in the wake of the Penn State child sex abuse scandal centering on former Nittany Lion assistant coach Jerry Sandusky, and died two months later.
