= 1973 Ole Miss Rebels football team =

American college football season

1973 Ole Miss Rebels football
- Conference: Southeastern Conference
- Record: 6–5 (4–3 SEC)
- Head coach: Billy Kinard (3rd season; first 3 games); Johnny Vaught (25th season; final 8 games)
- Home stadium: Hemingway Stadium; Mississippi Veterans Memorial Stadium

1973 Southeastern Conference football standings
	Conf.					Overall
Team	W		L		T	W		L		T
No. 4 Alabama $	8	–	0	–	0	11	–	1	–	0
No. 13 LSU	5	–	1	–	0	9	–	3	–	0
Ole Miss	4	–	3	–	0	6	–	5	–	0
No. 19 Tennessee	3	–	3	–	0	8	–	4	–	0
Georgia	3	–	4	–	0	7	–	4	–	1
Florida	3	–	4	–	0	7	–	5	–	0
Kentucky	3	–	4	–	0	5	–	6	–	0
Auburn	2	–	5	–	0	6	–	6	–	0
Mississippi State	2	–	5	–	0	4	–	5	–	2
Vanderbilt	1	–	5	–	0	5	–	6	–	0
$ – Conference champion; Rankings from AP Poll

The 1973 Ole Miss Rebels football team represented the University of Mississippi (Ole Miss) during the 1973 NCAA Division I football season as a member of the Southeastern Conference (SEC). The team was led by head coach Billy Kinard, in his third year, for the first three games and then by Johnny Vaught, in his 25th year, for their last eight games. The Rebels played their home games at Hemingway Stadium in Oxford, Mississippi and Mississippi Veterans Memorial Stadium in Jackson, Mississippi. They finished the season with a record of six wins and five losses (6–5, 4–3 SEC).

== Schedule ==
Date	Opponent	Site	TV	Result	Attendance	Source
September 8	Villanova*	Mississippi Veterans Memorial Stadium; Jackson, MS		W 24–6	36,000	
September 15	at Missouri*	Faurot Field; Columbia, MO		L 0–17	51,620	
September 22	Memphis State*	Mississippi Veterans Memorial Stadium; Jackson, MS (rivalry)		L 13–17	45,620	
September 29	Southern Miss*	Hemingway Stadium; Oxford, MS		W 41–0	31,500	
October 6	at Auburn	Jordan–Hare Stadium; Auburn, AL (rivalry)		L 7–14	56,500	
October 13	at Georgia	Sanford Stadium; Athens, GA		L 0–20	57,800	
October 20	at Florida	Florida Field; Gainesville, FL		W 13–10	47,079	
October 27	Vanderbilt	Hemingway Stadium; Oxford, MS (rivalry)		W 24–14	33,427	
November 3	No. 7 LSU	Mississippi Veterans Memorial Stadium; Jackson, MS (rivalry)	ABC	L 14–51	47,222	
November 17	No. 16 Tennessee	Mississippi Veterans Memorial Stadium; Jackson, MS (rivalry)	ABC	W 28–18	39,500	
November 24	vs. Mississippi State	Mississippi Veterans Memorial Stadium; Jackson, MS (Egg Bowl)		W 38–10	43,556	
*Non-conference game; Rankings from AP Poll released prior to the game

== Personnel ==
1973 Ole Miss Rebels football team roster
Players
Coaches
Offense

Pos.	#	Name	Class
RB		Gene Allen
QB		Stan Bounds
OL		Art Bressler
OL		Sam Correo
RB		Doug Hamley
OL		James Hickman
RB		Paul Hofer
TE		Rick Kimbrough
RB		Larry Kramer
OL		Dick Lawrence
QB		Kenny Lyons
QB		Bill Malouf
OL		Bill Marshall
RB		Dan Murff
OL		Dave Parham
RB		James Reed
WR		Bill Small
WR		Danny Stallings
TE		Butch Veazey
RB		Reed Wakefield
QB		Norris Weese	Sr
OL		Chuck Wood

Defense

Pos.	#	Name	Class
LB		Bob Bailess
DL		Steve Burkhalter
DB		Mickey Fratesi
DB		Gary Hall
DB		Harry Harrison
LB		Jim Horne
LB		Terry Kilpatrick
DL		Greg Markow
DB		Pete Markow
DL		Bill May
DL		Pete Robertson
LB		Stump Russell
LB		Jim Stuart
DL		Gary Turner
DL		Ben Williams

Special teams

Pos.	#	Name	Class

Head coach

- Billy Kinard

Coordinators/assistant coaches

Legend

- (C) Team captain
- (S) Suspended
- (I) Ineligible
- Injured
- Redshirt
