= 1973 Vanderbilt Commodores football team =

American college football season

1973 Vanderbilt Commodores football
- Conference: Southeastern Conference
- Record: 5–6 (1–5 SEC)
- Head coach: Steve Sloan (1st season)
- Home stadium: Dudley Field

1973 Southeastern Conference football standings
	Conf.					Overall
Team	W		L		T	W		L		T
No. 4 Alabama $	8	–	0	–	0	11	–	1	–	0
No. 13 LSU	5	–	1	–	0	9	–	3	–	0
Ole Miss	4	–	3	–	0	6	–	5	–	0
No. 19 Tennessee	3	–	3	–	0	8	–	4	–	0
Georgia	3	–	4	–	0	7	–	4	–	1
Florida	3	–	4	–	0	7	–	5	–	0
Kentucky	3	–	4	–	0	5	–	6	–	0
Auburn	2	–	5	–	0	6	–	6	–	0
Mississippi State	2	–	5	–	0	4	–	5	–	2
Vanderbilt	1	–	5	–	0	5	–	6	–	0
$ – Conference champion; Rankings from AP Poll

The 1973 Vanderbilt Commodores football team represented Vanderbilt University in the 1973 NCAA Division I football season. The Commodores were led by head coach Steve Sloan in his first season and finished the season with a record of five wins and six losses (5–6 overall, 1–5 in the SEC), which placed them in last place in the Southeastern Conference.

== Schedule ==
Date	Time	Opponent	Site	Result	Attendance	Source
September 15		Chattanooga*	Dudley Field; Nashville, TN	W 14–12	23,600	
September 22		at Mississippi State	Scott Field; Starkville, MS	L 21–52	25,136	
September 29		No. 5 Alabama	Dudley Field; Nashville, TN	L 0–44	34,500	
October 6		at Virginia*	Scott Stadium; Charlottesville, VA	W 39–22	21,000	
October 13		William & Mary*	Dudley Field; Nashville, TN	W 20–7	17,123	
October 20		Georgia	Dudley Field; Nashville, TN (rivalry)	W 18–14	21,500	
October 27		at Ole Miss	Hemingway Stadium; Oxford, MS (rivalry)	L 14–24	33,427	
November 10		Kentucky	Dudley Field; Nashville, TN (rivalry)	L 17–27	29,350	
November 17		at Tulane*	Tulane Stadium; New Orleans, LA	L 3–24	31,199	
November 24	1:30 p.m.	Tampa*	Dudley Field; Nashville, TN	W 18–16	14,500	
December 1		at No. 19 Tennessee	Neyland Stadium; Knoxville, TN (rivalry)	L 17–20	66,702	
*Non-conference game; Rankings from AP Poll released prior to the game; All times are in Central time
