= Vince Kendrick =

American football player and coach (1952–2015)

No. 20
- Position: Running back

Personal information
- Born: March 18, 1952; Miami, Florida, U.S.
- Died: March 21, 2015 (aged 63); Deerfield Beach, Florida, U.S.
- Listed height: 6 ft 0 in (1.83 m)
- Listed weight: 231 lb (105 kg)

Career information
- High school: Miami Springs (Miami Springs, Florida)
- College: Florida
- NFL draft: 1974: 4th round, 96th overall pick

Career history

Playing
- Atlanta Falcons (1974); Tampa Bay Buccaneers (1976)

Coaching
- Florida (Asst.) (1980–1983)

Career NFL statistics
- Rushing attempts: 18
- Rushing yards: 74
- Receptions: 12
- Receiving yards: 86
- Total TDs: 1
- Stats at Pro Football Reference

Vincent Kendrick (March 18, 1952 – March 21, 2015) was an American professional football player who was a running back for two seasons in the National Football League (NFL) during the 1970s. Kendrick played college football for the Florida Gators, and thereafter, he played in the NFL for the Atlanta Falcons and Tampa Bay Buccaneers.

== Early life ==
Kendrick was born in Miami, Florida, in 1952 to Green Lester and Pearlie Mae Kendrick. He attended Miami Springs High School in Miami Springs, Florida, where he played high school football for the Miami Springs Golden Hawks.

== College career ==
Kendrick received an athletic scholarship to attend the University of Florida in Gainesville, Florida, where he played for coach Doug Dickey's Florida Gators football team from 1971 to 1973. As a senior team captain in 1973, he rushed 127 times for 567 yards and five touchdowns. In his three-year college career, he totaled 1,269 yards on 279 attempts in an injury-plagued career spent primarily blocking for tailback Nat Moore.

Kendrick graduated from the University of Florida with a bachelor's degree in broadcasting in 1980.

== Professional career ==
The Atlanta Falcons selected Kendrick in the fourth round (96th pick overall) of the 1974 NFL draft, and he played for the Falcons for a single season in 1974, mainly as a backup and on special teams. He sat out 1975 after suffering a knee injury in a preseason game against the New York Jets. One of many injured Falcons, he was left unprotected for the 1976 NFL expansion draft, and was selected by the Tampa Bay Buccaneers expansion team. In Tampa Bay, he found himself in competition with his Florida Gators successor, Jimmy DuBose, for the fullback spot on the Bucs' roster. He scored the Bucs' first franchise touchdown, in an exhibition game against the Falcons, but was never able to regain his pre-injury form and was released after the season opener against the Houston Oilers.

== Life after the NFL ==
Kendrick returned to Gainesville after his two seasons in the NFL, first as a graduate assistant for Florida Gators head coach Doug Dickey, and then as an assistant coach for new head coach Charley Pell, working with the Florida Gators running backs. After his first wife died, Kendrick and his young son Vinnie briefly lived in the football dormitory. Kendrick left coaching after the 1983 season, and eventually married his second wife, Altermease Kendrick, owner of My Choice Community Development, Inc. He worked as the community service director for the city of Deerfield Beach, Florida. Vince volunteers his wisdom and talent with his wife as they embark on starting a charter school (My Choice Academy) in Lake Park, Florida. Together they have four children: Robert Sr., Paula (deceased 2014), Vinnie and Alexis. They also have seven grandchildren Brittany, Robert Jr., Devin, JeMiah, Jocelyn, Naima, and Caleb. Naima was one of the few grandchildren who spent time with him. He loved her and supported her through everything and was basically a 2nd dad to her.

Kendrick died on March 21, 2015, from cancer.

== See also ==
- Florida Gators football, 1970–79
- List of Florida Gators in the NFL draft
- List of University of Florida alumni
