= 1973 Mississippi State Bulldogs football team =

American college football season

1973 Mississippi State Bulldogs football
- Conference: Southeastern Conference
- Record: 4–5–2 (2–5 SEC)
- Head coach: Bob Tyler (1st season)
- Home stadium: Scott Field; Mississippi Veterans Memorial Stadium

1973 Southeastern Conference football standings
	Conf.					Overall
Team	W		L		T	W		L		T
No. 4 Alabama $	8	–	0	–	0	11	–	1	–	0
No. 13 LSU	5	–	1	–	0	9	–	3	–	0
Ole Miss	4	–	3	–	0	6	–	5	–	0
No. 19 Tennessee	3	–	3	–	0	8	–	4	–	0
Georgia	3	–	4	–	0	7	–	4	–	1
Florida	3	–	4	–	0	7	–	5	–	0
Kentucky	3	–	4	–	0	5	–	6	–	0
Auburn	2	–	5	–	0	6	–	6	–	0
Mississippi State	2	–	5	–	0	4	–	5	–	2
Vanderbilt	1	–	5	–	0	5	–	6	–	0
$ – Conference champion; Rankings from AP Poll

The 1973 Mississippi State Bulldogs football team represented Mississippi State University as a member of the Southeastern Conference (SEC) during the 1973 NCAA Division I football season. Led by first-year head coach Bob Tyler, Mississippi State compiled an overall record of 4–5–2 with mark of 2–5 in conference play, tying for eighth place in the SEC. The Bulldogs played their home games at Scott Field in Starkville, Mississippi.

== Schedule ==
Date	Time	Opponent	Site	Result	Attendance	Source
September 15		Northeast Louisiana*	Scott Field; Starkville, MS	T 21–21	25,000–26,000	
September 22		Vanderbilt	Scott Field; Starkville, MS	W 52–21	25,136	
September 29		No. 16 Florida	Mississippi Veterans Memorial Stadium; Jackson, MS	W 33–12	35,000	
October 6		Kentucky	Mississippi Veterans Memorial Stadium; Jackson, MS	L 14–42	41,000	
October 13		at Florida State*	Doak Campbell Stadium; Tallahassee, FL	W 37–12	19,829	
October 20	7:01 p.m.	at Louisville*	Fairgrounds Stadium; Louisville, KY	W 18–7	19,005	
October 27		Southern Miss*^{†}	Scott Field; Starkville, MS	T 10–10	33,500	
November 3		No. 2 Alabama	Mississippi Veterans Memorial Stadium; Jackson, MS (rivalry)	L 0–35	46,000	
November 10		at Auburn	Jordan–Hare Stadium; Auburn, AL	L 17–31	48,427	
November 17		at LSU	Tiger Stadium; Baton Rouge, LA (rivalry)	L 7–26	66,536	
November 24		vs. Ole Miss	Mississippi Veterans Memorial Stadium; Jackson, MS (Egg Bowl)	L 10–38	43,556	
*Non-conference game; ^{†}Homecoming; Rankings from AP Poll released prior to the game; All times are in Central time
