= 1973 Florida Gators football team =

American college football season

1973 Florida Gators football

Tangerine Bowl, L 7–16 vs. Miami (OH)
- Conference: Southeastern Conference

Ranking
- Coaches: No. 19
- Record: 7–5 (3–4 SEC)
- Head coach: Doug Dickey (4th season)
- Offensive coordinator: Jimmy Dunn (4th season)
- Defensive coordinator: Doug Knotts (4th season)
- Captains: David Hitchcock; Vince Kendrick
- Home stadium: Florida Field

1973 Southeastern Conference football standings
	Conf.					Overall
Team	W		L		T	W		L		T
No. 4 Alabama $	8	–	0	–	0	11	–	1	–	0
No. 13 LSU	5	–	1	–	0	9	–	3	–	0
Ole Miss	4	–	3	–	0	6	–	5	–	0
No. 19 Tennessee	3	–	3	–	0	8	–	4	–	0
Georgia	3	–	4	–	0	7	–	4	–	1
Florida	3	–	4	–	0	7	–	5	–	0
Kentucky	3	–	4	–	0	5	–	6	–	0
Auburn	2	–	5	–	0	6	–	6	–	0
Mississippi State	2	–	5	–	0	4	–	5	–	2
Vanderbilt	1	–	5	–	0	5	–	6	–	0
$ – Conference champion; Rankings from AP Poll

The 1973 Florida Gators football team represented the University of Florida during the 1973 NCAA Division I football season. The season was Doug Dickey's fourth as the Florida Gators football team's head coach. Dickey's 1973 Florida Gators finished with a 7–5 overall record and a 3–4 Southeastern Conference (SEC) record, tying for fifth among ten SEC teams.

The Tangerine Bowl was temporarily moved from Orlando to Gainesville as the completion of the Citrus Bowl expansion was delayed. The fans were greeted by a record cold snap, with gametime temperatures at 25 degrees Fahrenheit (minus-4 degrees Celsius); the cold weather benefited the visiting Miami Redskins, who won 16–7.

== Schedule ==
Date	Time	Opponent	Rank	Site	TV	Result	Attendance	Source
September 15	7:30 pm	Kansas State*	No. 14	Florida Field; Gainesville, FL		W 21–10	50,673	
September 22		vs. Southern Miss*	No. 15	Tampa Stadium; Tampa, FL		W 14–13	38,377	
September 29		at Mississippi State	No. 16	Mississippi Veterans Memorial Stadium; Jackson, MS		L 12–33	35,000	
October 6	8:30 pm	at No. 10 LSU		Tiger Stadium; Baton Rouge, LA (rivalry)		L 3–24	66,974	
October 13	4:00 pm	No. 3 Alabama		Florida Field; Gainesville, FL (rivalry)		L 14–35	64,864	
October 20	4:00 pm	Ole Miss^{†}		Florida Field; Gainesville, FL		L 10–13	47,079	
November 3	1:30 pm	at No. 19 Auburn		Jordan–Hare Stadium; Auburn, AL (rivalry)		W 12–8	63,429	
November 10	2:00 pm	vs. Georgia		Gator Bowl Stadium; Jacksonville, FL (rivalry)	ABC	W 11–10	70,266	
November 17	2:00 pm	Kentucky		Florida Field; Gainesville, FL (rivalry)		W 20–18	55,328	
November 24	7:30 pm	at Miami (FL)*		Miami Orange Bowl; Miami, FL (rivalry)		W 14–7	39,071	
December 1	2:00 pm	Florida State*		Florida Field; Gainesville, FL (rivalry)		W 49–0	62,233	
December 22		vs. No. 15 Miami (OH)*		Florida Field; Gainesville, FL (Tangerine Bowl)	MTN	L 7–16	37,234	
*Non-conference game; ^{†}Homecoming; Rankings from AP Poll released prior to the game; All times are in Eastern time

== Game summaries ==
=== Ole Miss ===
John Williams kicks school-record 53-yard field goal.

=== Auburn ===
Florida Gators (2-4) at #19 Auburn Tigers (4-2)

Quarter	1	2	3	4	Total
Florida	0	6	6	0	12
Auburn	0	0	0	8	8

at Jordan–Hare Stadium, Auburn, AL

- Date: November 3
- Game attendance: 63,429

Game information

Florida

- Vince Kendrick - 23 Rush, 119 Yds

Don Gaffney made the start, becoming the first black quarterback in school history, and Florida won at Jordan–Hare Stadium for the first time.

Scoring summary

Quarter	Time	Drive			Team	Scoring information	Score	
Quarter	Time	Plays	Yards	TOP	Team	Scoring information	FLA	AUB
2					Florida	Parker 22-yard touchdown reception from Gaffney, kick no good	6	0
3					Florida	Kendrick 5-yard touchdown run, 2-point pass no good	12	0
4	0:00				Auburn	Gossom 1-yard touchdown reception from Walls, 2-point pass good	12	8
"TOP" = time of possession. For other American football terms, see Glossary of American football.							12	8

=== Vs. Georgia ===
Florida Gators (3-4) vs. Georgia Bulldogs (4-3-1)

Quarter	1	2	3	4	Total
Georgia	0	7	0	3	10
Florida	3	0	0	8	11

at Gator Bowl, Jacksonville, Florida

- Date: November 10
- Game time: 2:00 p.m. EST
- Game attendance: 70,266
- TV: ABC

Game information

First quarter

- FLA – John Williams 28-yard field goal. Florida 3–0.

Second quarter

- UGA – Appleby 15-yard pass from Johnson (Leavitt kick). Georgia 7–3.

Third quarter

- No scoring

Fourth quarter

- UGA – Leavitt 42-yard field goal. Georgia 10–3.
- FLA – Lee McGriff 18-yard pass from Don Gaffney (pass good), 3:48. Florida 11–10. Drive: 13 plays, 80 yards.

Top receivers

- FLA – Joel Parker – 3 receptions, 71 yards

=== At Miami (FL) ===
Florida Gators at Miami (FL) Hurricanes

Quarter	1	2	3	4	Total
Florida	7	7	0	0	14
Miami (FL)	0	0	0	7	7

at Orange Bowl, Miami, Florida

- Date: November 24
- Game attendance: 39,071
- First quarter
  - FLA – Vince Kendrick 14-yard run (David Posey kick). Florida 7–0. Drive: 7 plays.
  Second quarter
  - FLA – Joel Parker 7-yard pass from Don Gaffney (kick good). Florida 14–0. Drive: 4 plays, 17 yards.
  Third quarter
  - No scoring
  Fourth quarter
  - MIA – Phil August 40-yard pass from Ed Carney (Brian Selmer kick). Florida 14–7.

Florida's defense held the Hurricanes out of the end zone from the five-yard line with 33 seconds left in the game.

== Roster ==
1973 Florida Gators football team roster
Players
Coaches
Offense

Pos.	#	Name	Class
G	74	Kris Anderson	Sr
FB		Vernon Barber	Fr
C		Mike Berry	Fr
WR	89	Hollis Boardman	Sr
QB	5	David Bowden	Jr
RB		Larry Brinson	Fr
OL		Ken Brock	Fr
WR		Charlie Brown	Fr
OT		Herbert Cain	Fr
OL		Gary Chotiner	Fr
RB	17	Thom Clifford	So
RB		Alvin Cowans	Fr
TE	88	Alvis Darby	So
RB		Henry Davis	Fr
QB	12	Robbie Davis	Jr
FB	35	Jim DuBose	So
QB		Jimmy Fisher	Fr
TE	81	Hank Foldberg	Sr
C		Brian Fromang	Fr
WR		Derrick Gaffney	Fr
QB	8	Don Gaffney	So
QB	10	Chan Gailey	Sr
FB	37	Carey Geiger	Sr
TE		Dan Grebe	Fr
RB		Bill Hallal	Fr
WR		Theo Hawkins	Fr
QB		Cleaver Hayling	Fr
OT		Ed Jacobsen	Fr
RB	20	Vince Kendrick (C)	Sr
OL		Steve Kieter	Fr
C	56	Jimmy Kynes	Jr
G	64	Burton Lawless	Jr
G	61	Gerald Loper	So
FB		Vernon Masters	Fr
WR	25	Lee McGriff	Jr
RB	33	Nat Moore	Sr
C	51	Robbie Moore	So
RB		Robert Morgan	Fr
OL		Pete Morley	Fr
OT	73	Bruce Mulliniks	So
TE	83	Scott Nugent	Jr
OT	70	Gary Padgett	Sr
WR		Bill Parker	Fr
WR	44	Joel Parker	Sr
OT	76	Paul Parker	Jr
TE		Joe Pupello	Fr
RB	31	James Richards	So
WR	22	Glenn Sever	So
WR	40	Eddie Sirmons	So
C		Jeff Sprague	Fr
OT	77	Mike Stanfield	Jr
C	65	Jimmy Ray Stephens	So
OT		Mark Totten	Fr
RB		Keith Tribble	Fr
RB	41	Andy Wade	So
RB		Alan Williams	Fr
G	63	Mike Williams	So
OT		Bill Wright	Fr
QB		David Wright	Fr
OT	79	Joe Wunderly	Jr

Defense

Pos.	#	Name	Class
DE	92	Joe Abbott	So
DE		Robert Adkins	Fr
CB	29	Robby Ball	So
LB		Bradd Barker	Fr
LB	59	Rick Boedy	Jr
DE	50	Ricky Browne	Sr
CB	38	Alvin Butler	Jr
LB	43	Glenn Cameron	Jr
DL		Darrell Carpenter	Fr
DE		Bill Conan	Fr
LB		Jim D'Onofrio	Fr
DB		Don Dickey	Fr
LB	54	Ward Eastman	So
DB	24	Wayne Fields	So
LB	57	Johnny Foreman	Jr
LB	99	Sammy Green	So
DT	78	Clint Griffith	Jr
DT	66	David Hitchcock (C)	Sr
DE		Calvin Jones	Fr
DE	90	Preston Kendrick	Jr
DT	60	John Lacer	Sr
CB	47	Roy Mallory	Jr
LB		Mark Maynor	Fr
DE	84	Chris McCoun	Sr
DE	85	Mike Moore	Sr
DT	72	George Nicholas	So
LB	55	Ralph Ortega	Jr
S	30	Jim Revels	Sr
CB	21	Tyson Sever	Jr
DE	95	Mike Smith	So
DT	75	David Starkey	So
DL		George Sullivan	Fr
DB	32	Andy Summers	Jr
S	28	Randy Talbot	Jr
LB		Jack Zukley	Fr

Special teams

Pos.	#	Name	Class
K	6	Elwood Aust	Sr
P	13	Tom Dolfi	So
P	9	Buster Morrison	Jr
K		David Posey	Fr
K	18	John Williams	So

Head coach

- Doug Dickey

Coordinators/assistant coaches

- Don Breaux
  Wide receivers
- Don Brown
  Offensive line/tight ends
- Bill Carr
  Scout
- Jimmy Dunn
  Offensive coordinator/quarterbacks/running backs
- Dave Fuller
  Scout team
- Jack Hall
  Freshman
- Ken Hatfield
  Defensive backs
- Kim Helton
  Offensive line
- Doug Knotts
  Defensive coordinator/linebackers
- Jack Thompson
  Defensive line
- Allen Trammell
  Recruiting

Legend

- (C) Team captain
- (S) Suspended
- (I) Ineligible
- Injured
- Redshirt

Roster
Last update: 2018-Dec-23

== Awards and honors ==
Ricky Browne

- 1st Team All-SEC (AP)

David Hitchock

- 2nd Team All-SEC (AP)

Burton Lawless

- 2nd Team All-SEC (AP)

Lee McGriff

- 2nd Team All-SEC (AP)

Ralph Ortega

- 1st Team All-SEC (AP, UPI)

Jim Revels

- 1st Team All-SEC (AP)

Jimmy Ray Stephens

- 2nd Team All-SEC (AP)
