= 1973 Kentucky Wildcats football team =

American college football season

1973 Kentucky Wildcats football
- Conference: Southeastern Conference
- Record: 5–6 (3–4 SEC)
- Head coach: Fran Curci (1st season)
- Offensive coordinator: Jon Mirilovich (1st season)
- Defensive coordinator: Bill Narduzzi (1st season)
- Home stadium: Commonwealth Stadium

1973 Southeastern Conference football standings
	Conf.					Overall
Team	W		L		T	W		L		T
No. 4 Alabama $	8	–	0	–	0	11	–	1	–	0
No. 13 LSU	5	–	1	–	0	9	–	3	–	0
Ole Miss	4	–	3	–	0	6	–	5	–	0
No. 19 Tennessee	3	–	3	–	0	8	–	4	–	0
Georgia	3	–	4	–	0	7	–	4	–	1
Florida	3	–	4	–	0	7	–	5	–	0
Kentucky	3	–	4	–	0	5	–	6	–	0
Auburn	2	–	5	–	0	6	–	6	–	0
Mississippi State	2	–	5	–	0	4	–	5	–	2
Vanderbilt	1	–	5	–	0	5	–	6	–	0
$ – Conference champion; Rankings from AP Poll

The 1973 Kentucky Wildcats football team was an American football team that represented the University of Kentucky in the Southeastern Conference (SEC) during the 1973 NCAA Division I football season. In their first season under head coach Fran Curci, the Wildcats compiled a 5–6 record (3–4 against conference opponents) and finished in a three-way tie for fifth place in the SEC.

This was Kentucky's first season playing at Commonwealth Stadium. The Wildcats christened the facility with a 31–26 victory vs. Virginia Tech in their season opener.

The team's statistical leaders included Sonny Collins with 1,213 rushing yards and 78 points scored, Mike Fanuzzi with 572 passing yards, and Elmore Stephens with 282 receiving yards. Three Kentucky players received first-team honors from the Associated Press (AP) and/or United Press International (UPI) on the 1973 All-SEC football team: Sonny Collins (AP, UPI); and end Jim McCollum (UPI); defensive back Darryl Bishop (UPI).

== Schedule ==
Date	Opponent	Site	Result	Attendance	Source
September 15	Virginia Tech*	Commonwealth Stadium; Lexington, KY	W 31–26	> 48,000	
September 22	Alabama	Commonwealth Stadium; Lexington, KY	L 14–28	54,100	
September 29	at Indiana*	Memorial Stadium; Bloomington, IN (rivalry)	L 3–17	51,523	
October 6	at Mississippi State	Mississippi Veterans Memorial Stadium; Jackson, MS	W 42–14	41,000	
October 13	North Carolina*	Commonwealth Stadium; Lexington, KY	L 10–16	51,500	
October 20	at LSU	Tiger Stadium; Baton Rouge, LA	L 21–28	66,991	
October 27	at Georgia	Sanford Stadium; Athens, GA	W 12–7	54,500	
November 3	Tulane*^{†}	Commonwealth Stadium; Lexington, KY	W 34–7	19,360	
November 10	at Vanderbilt	Dudley Field; Nashville, TN (rivalry)	W 27–17	29,350	
November 17	Florida	Florida Field; Gainesville, FL (rivalry)	L 18–20	55,328	
November 24	Tennessee	Commonwealth Stadium; Lexington, KY (rivalry)	L 14–16	54,000	
*Non-conference game; ^{†}Homecoming

== Roster ==
- Sonny Collins, running back, sophomore
- Doug Kotar, running back, senior
