= 1973 Tennessee Volunteers football team =

American college football season

1973 Tennessee Volunteers football

Gator Bowl, L 19–28 vs. Texas Tech
- Conference: Southeastern Conference

Ranking
- AP: No. 19
- Record: 8–4 (3–3 SEC)
- Head coach: Bill Battle (4th season)
- Offensive coordinator: Jim Wright
- Captain: Eddie Brown
- Home stadium: Neyland Stadium

1973 Southeastern Conference football standings
	Conf.					Overall
Team	W		L		T	W		L		T
No. 4 Alabama $	8	–	0	–	0	11	–	1	–	0
No. 13 LSU	5	–	1	–	0	9	–	3	–	0
Ole Miss	4	–	3	–	0	6	–	5	–	0
No. 19 Tennessee	3	–	3	–	0	8	–	4	–	0
Georgia	3	–	4	–	0	7	–	4	–	1
Florida	3	–	4	–	0	7	–	5	–	0
Kentucky	3	–	4	–	0	5	–	6	–	0
Auburn	2	–	5	–	0	6	–	6	–	0
Mississippi State	2	–	5	–	0	4	–	5	–	2
Vanderbilt	1	–	5	–	0	5	–	6	–	0
$ – Conference champion; Rankings from AP Poll

The 1973 Tennessee Volunteers football team (variously "Tennessee", "UT" or the "Vols") represented the University of Tennessee in the 1973 NCAA Division I football season. Playing as a member of the Southeastern Conference (SEC), the team was led by head coach Bill Battle, in his fourth year, and played their home games at Neyland Stadium in Knoxville, Tennessee. They finished the season with a record of eight wins and four losses (8–4 overall, 3–3 in the SEC) and a loss to Texas Tech in the 1973 Gator Bowl.

== Schedule ==
Date	Time	Opponent	Rank	Site	TV	Result	Attendance	Source
September 15		Duke*	No. 9	Neyland Stadium; Knoxville, TN		W 21–17	70,787	
September 22	2:00 p.m.	at Army*	No. 10	Michie Stadium; West Point, NY		W 37–18	39,942	
September 29		No. 11 Auburn	No. 9	Neyland Stadium; Knoxville, TN (rivalry)		W 21–0	71,656	
October 6		vs. Kansas*	No. 9	Liberty Bowl Memorial Stadium; Memphis, TN		W 28–27	42,842–43,716	
October 13		Georgia Tech*	No. 8	Neyland Stadium; Knoxville, TN (rivalry)		W 20–14	70,616	
October 20		at No. 2 Alabama	No. 10	Legion Field; Birmingham, AL (Third Saturday in October)	ABC	L 21–42	72,226	
October 27		TCU*	No. 14	Neyland Stadium; Knoxville, TN		W 39–7	66,356	
November 3		Georgia^{†}	No. 11	Neyland Stadium; Knoxville, TN		L 31–35	70,812	
November 17		at Ole Miss	No. 16	Mississippi Veterans Memorial Stadium; Jackson, MS (rivalry)	ABC	L 18–28	39,500	
November 24		at Kentucky		Commonwealth Stadium; Lexington, KY (rivalry)		W 16–14	54,000	
December 1		Vanderbilt	No. 19	Neyland Stadium; Knoxville, TN (rivalry)		W 20–17	66,702	
December 29		vs. No. 11 Texas Tech*	No. 20	Gator Bowl Stadium; Jacksonville, FL (Gator Bowl)	ABC	L 19–28	62,109	
*Non-conference game; ^{†}Homecoming; Rankings from AP Poll released prior to the game; All times are in Eastern time

== Game summaries ==
=== Army ===
Quarter	1	2	3	4	Total
#10 Tennessee	6	7	7	17	37
Army	3	0	3	12	18

at Michie Stadium, West Point, New York

- Date: September 22
- Game attendance: 39,942

Game information

First Quarter

- ARMY - Barclay 25-yard field goal
- TEN - Townsend 37-yard field goal
- TEN - Townsend 26-yard field goal

Second Quarter

- TEN - Stanback 1-yard run (Townsend kick)

Third Quarter

- ARMY - Barclay 38-yard field goal
- TEN - Chancey 10-yard run (Townsend kick)

Fourth Quarter

- TEN - Townsend 26-yard field goal
- ARMY - Simons 1-yard run (pass failed)
- TEN - Morgan 28-yard pass from Holloway (Townsend kick)
- ARMY - Armstrong 25-yard pass from Fink (pass failed)
- TEN - Yarborough 42-yard pass from Valbuena (Townsend kick)

Condredge Holloway set up Tennessee touchdowns with a 52-yard pass and a 48-yard run as Tennessee won its second straight while Army dropped its third consecutive season opener. Holloway fumbled at his own 12 on the second play of the game, which set up an Army field goal. The slippery QB came back to engineer two first-quarter field goals by Ricky Townsend. Midway through the second period, Holloway evaded the rush and found Emmon Love for a nine-yard gain to the 33. On the next play, he found Stanley Morgan deep down the left sideline for a long bomb to the Army 15.

== Roster ==
1973 Tennessee Volunteers football team roster
Players
Coaches
Offense

Pos.	#	Name	Class
G	79	Mike Caldwell	So
RB	32	Paul Careathers	Jr
FB	41	Steve Chancey	Sr
OT	74	Phil Clabo	So
G	68	Steve Cone	Jr
WR	81	Tim Fitchpatrick	So
TE	82	Mitchell Gravitt	So
QB	7	Condredge Holloway	Jr
WR	12	Chip Howard	Sr
OL		Gene Killian
WR	42	Robert Lassiter	Sr
WR	85	Emmon Love	Sr
G	67	Mickey Marvin	Fr
RB	31	Terry Moore	So
WR	21	Stanley Morgan	Fr
TE	88	Jim Richardson	Jr
OL		Mike Rotella
FB	36	Bill Rudder	Sr
OT	77	David Shaffer	Sr
RB	24	Haskel Stanback	Sr
RB	23	Tommy West	So
RB	35	Sid Witherington	Jr
C	50	Steve Urubek	Sr
QB	5	Gary Valbuena	Sr
WR	17	John Yarbrough	So

Defense

Pos.	#	Name	Class
LB	62	Bill Bandemier	So
DB	25	Eddie Brown	Sr
DE	63	David Campbell	Sr
DB	11	Nick Carmichael	Sr
LB	78	Joe Gallagher	Fr
DE	19	Sammy Hair	Jr
LB	57	Ron McCartney	So
DT	53	Joe Mills	Jr
DB	27	Jon Murdic	Jr
DE	46	David Poley	So
LB	45	Steve Poole	So
DT	70	Robert Pulliam	Jr
DB	29	Russ Rabenstein	So
LB	55	Art Reynolds	Sr
LB		Hank Walter
DB	26	Jim Watts	Jr
LB	54	Eddie Wilson	Sr

Special teams

Pos.	#	Name	Class
P	44	Neil Clabo	Jr

Head coach

- Bill Battle

Coordinators/assistant coaches

Legend

- (C) Team captain
- (S) Suspended
- (I) Ineligible
- Injured
- Redshirt

== Draft picks ==
Player	Position	Round	Pick	NFL club
Bill Rudder	Running Back	3	59	San Diego Chargers
Haskel Stanback	Running Back	5	114	Cincinnati Bengals
Eddie Brown	Defensive Back	8	199	Cleveland Browns
Gary Valbuena	Quarterback	10	260	Miami Dolphins
Gene Killian	Guard	16	413	Dallas Cowboys
