= 1973 Georgia Bulldogs football team =

American college football season

1973 Georgia Bulldogs football

Peach Bowl champion

Peach Bowl, W 17–16 vs. Maryland
- Conference: Southeastern Conference
- Record: 7–4–1 (3–4 SEC)
- Head coach: Vince Dooley (10th season)
- Defensive coordinator: Erk Russell (10th season)
- Home stadium: Sanford Stadium

1973 Southeastern Conference football standings
	Conf.					Overall
Team	W		L		T	W		L		T
No. 4 Alabama $	8	–	0	–	0	11	–	1	–	0
No. 13 LSU	5	–	1	–	0	9	–	3	–	0
Ole Miss	4	–	3	–	0	6	–	5	–	0
No. 19 Tennessee	3	–	3	–	0	8	–	4	–	0
Georgia	3	–	4	–	0	7	–	4	–	1
Florida	3	–	4	–	0	7	–	5	–	0
Kentucky	3	–	4	–	0	5	–	6	–	0
Auburn	2	–	5	–	0	6	–	6	–	0
Mississippi State	2	–	5	–	0	4	–	5	–	2
Vanderbilt	1	–	5	–	0	5	–	6	–	0
$ – Conference champion; Rankings from AP Poll

The 1973 Georgia Bulldogs football team represented the University of Georgia as a member of the Southeastern Conference (SEC) during the 1973 NCAA Division I football season. Led by 10th-year head coach Vince Dooley, the Bulldogs compiled an overall record of 7–4–1, with a mark of 3–4 in conference play, and finished tied for fifth in the SEC.

== Schedule ==
Date	Opponent	Site	TV	Result	Attendance	Source
September 15	Pittsburgh*	Sanford Stadium; Athens, GA		T 7–7	52,005	
September 22	Clemson*	Sanford Stadium; Athens, GA (rivalry)		W 31–14	48,280	
September 29	No. 19 NC State*	Sanford Stadium; Athens, GA		W 31–12	52,700	
October 6	at No. 3 Alabama	Denny Stadium; Tuscaloosa, AL (rivalry)		L 14–28	57,790	
October 13	Ole Miss	Sanford Stadium; Athens, GA		W 20–0	57,800	
October 20	at Vanderbilt	Dudley Field; Nashville, TN (rivalry)		L 14–18	21,500	
October 27	Kentucky^{†}	Sanford Stadium; Athens, GA		L 7–12	54,500	
November 3	at No. 11 Tennessee	Neyland Stadium; Knoxville, TN (rivalry)		W 35–31	70,812	
November 10	vs. Florida	Gator Bowl Stadium; Jacksonville, FL (rivalry)	ABC	L 10–11	70,266	
November 17	Auburn	Sanford Stadium; Athens, GA (rivalry)		W 28–14	59,700	
December 1	at Georgia Tech*	Grant Field; Atlanta, GA (rivalry)		W 10–3	60,316	
December 28	vs. No. 18 Maryland*	Atlanta Stadium; Atlanta, GA (Peach Bowl)	Mizlou	W 17–16	38,107	
*Non-conference game; ^{†}Homecoming; Rankings from AP Poll released prior to the game

== Roster ==
1973 Georgia Bulldogs football team roster
Players
Coaches
Offense

Pos.	#	Name	Class
WR		Richard Appleby
QB	14	Andy Johnson	Sr
RB		Jimmy Poulos

Defense

Pos.	#	Name	Class

Special teams

Pos.	#	Name	Class
K		Allan Leavitt	Fr

Head coach

- Vince Dooley

Coordinators/assistant coaches

Legend

- (C) Team captain
- (S) Suspended
- (I) Ineligible
- Injured
- Redshirt
