= 1973 Tangerine Bowl =

American college football game

Miami Redskins	Florida Gators
(10–0)	(7–4)
MAC	SEC
16	7
Head coach: Bill Mallory	Head coach: Doug Dickey
AP / Coaches; 15 / 17	AP / Coaches; NR / T–18
	1	2	3	4	Total
Miami	3	0	10	3	16
Florida	0	0	0	7	7
- Date: December 22, 1973
- Season: 1973
- Stadium: Florida Field
- Location: Gainesville, Florida
- MVP: Chuck Varner, Miami (back); Brad Cousino, Miami (lineman)
- Referee: Richard McVay (MAC; split crew: MAC, SEC)
- Attendance: 37,234

The 1973 Tangerine Bowl was a college football postseason bowl game that featured the Florida Gators and the Miami Redskins (located in Oxford, Ohio and now nicknamed the RedHawks). Played in Gainesville, Florida, this game is the only time that the Tangerine Bowl (now the Citrus Bowl) was not played in Orlando.

== Background ==
=== Teams ===
Miami completed a perfect regular season with a Mid-American Conference championship, their first since 1965. This was their first bowl game appearance since the 1962 Tangerine Bowl. Florida's season started with two wins, but they lost their next four games (two to ranked opponents), before a five-game winning streak gave the Gators their first season over .500 since 1970. While they finished tied for fifth in the Southeastern Conference, they appeared in their first bowl game since the 1969 Gator Bowl.

=== Venue ===
In early 1973, construction improvements were planned for the game's normal venue, the Tangerine Bowl stadium in Orlando, to expand from 17,000 seats to 51,000 seats. However, construction was stalled in the summer due to legal concerns. Miami (Ohio) and East Carolina were planned to be the two teams invited, but East Carolina declined. Officials decided to move the game to the University of Florida's stadium in Gainesville and invite them, which they accepted. Participants were greeted with a near-record low temperature on game day of 35 °F (2 °C) at kickoff and 25 °F (−4 °C) by the end of the game.

== Game summary ==
After little scoring, and with Miami ahead 6–0 late in the third quarter, Florida fumbled a kickoff, which Miami recovered deep in Florida territory. Two plays later, Miami scored a touchdown, which proved to be the deciding score. Chuck Varner of Miami rushed for 157 yards on 28 carries and was named the game's outstanding back, while teammate Brad Cousino was named outstanding lineman.

== Scoring summary ==
Scoring summary

Quarter	Time	Drive			Team	Scoring information	Score	
Quarter	Time	Plays	Yards	TOP	Team	Scoring information	MU	FLA
1	5:54		29		MU	26-yard field goal by Dave Draudt	3	0
3	2:28				MU	45-yard field goal by Dave Draudt	6	0
3	2:08	2	8		MU	Chuck Varner 3-yard touchdown run, Dave Draudt kick good	13	0
4		3	31		UF	Nat Moore 1-yard touchdown run, John Williams kick good	13	7
4					MU	27-yard field goal by Dave Draudt	16	7
"TOP" = time of possession. For other American football terms, see Glossary of American football.							16	7

== Aftermath ==
The Redskins went to three straight Tangerine Bowls while winning four straight MAC titles, going 42–1–1 in that 4-year span. The Gators began a bowl streak, qualifying for a bowl for the next three seasons. The Tangerine Bowl returned to Orlando the following year, with renovations approved.

== Statistics ==
Statistics	Florida	Miami
First downs	12	14
Rushing yards	90	239
Passes attempted	21	8
Passes completed	9	1
Passes intercepted	4	0
Passing yards	99	6
Penalties–yards	3–27	3–39
Punts–average	6–34.3	10–33.3
Fumbles–lost	4–3	2–1
