= 1973 Peach Bowl =

American college football game

- 6th Peach Bowl
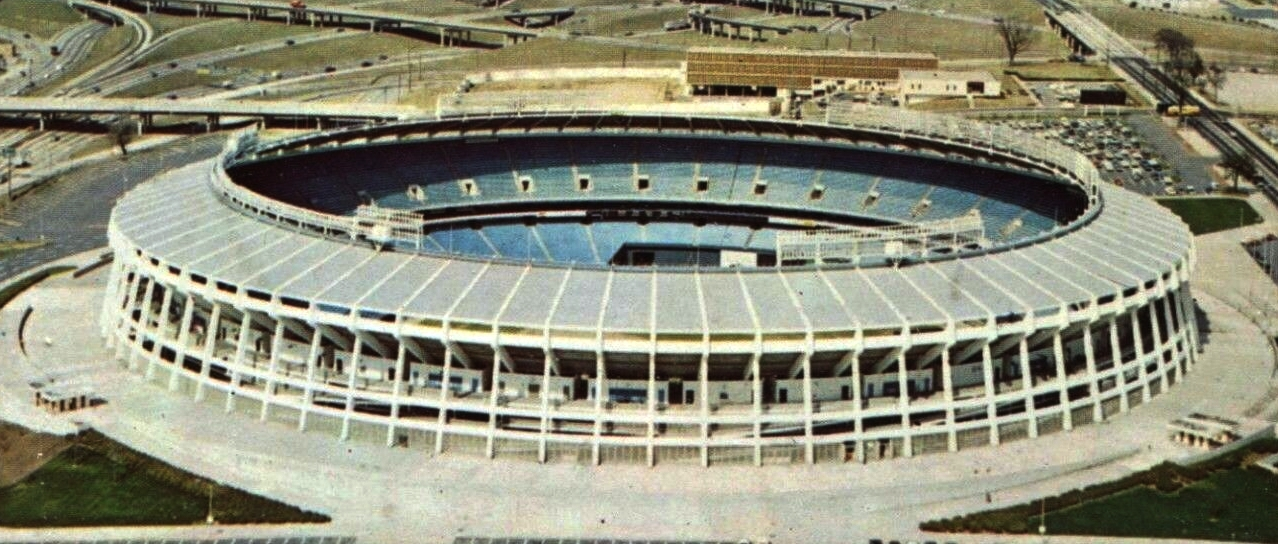
- Atlanta–Fulton County Stadium in Atlanta, Georgia, hosted the Peach Bowl.
Georgia Bulldogs	Maryland Terrapins
(6–4–1)	(8–3)
SEC	ACC
17	16
Head coach: Vince Dooley	Head coach: Jerry Claiborne
	AP / Coaches; 18 / 18
	1	2	3	4	Total
Georgia	0	10	7	0	17
Maryland	0	10	0	6	16
- Date: December 28, 1973
- Season: 1973
- Stadium: Atlanta–Fulton County Stadium
- Location: Atlanta, Georgia
- MVP: TB Louis Carter (Maryland); LB Sylvester Boler (Georgia)
- Referee: Pete Williams (SEC; split crew: SEC, ACC)
- Attendance: 38,107

United States TV coverage
- Network: Mizlou

The 1973 Peach Bowl was the sixth annual Peach Bowl, featuring the Georgia Bulldogs and the Maryland Terrapins.

== Background ==
Four losses in six games in the middle of the Bulldogs season lead them to finish tied for fifth place in the Southeastern Conference (SEC), going 2–1 against ranked teams, beating #19 NC State and #11 Tennessee, but losing to #1 Alabama. After 17 years, the Terrapins made their first bowl appearance since the late 1950s Led by Jerry Claiborne, in his second year at the program, Maryland tied for second-place finish in the Atlantic Coast Conference (ACC). This was the first Peach Bowl appearance for both teams.

== Game summary ==
Jimmy Poulos gave the Bulldogs the lead on a touchdown catch from Johnson to break the scoreless tie in the second quarter with 5:27 in the quarter. Walter White caught a 68-yard touchdown pass from Carter to tie the game 23 seconds later. His reception proved to be Maryland's only touchdown of the day. Mayer and Leavitt traded field goals to make the game even at 10 at halftime. A Terrapin fumble gave the Bulldogs the ball in Maryland territory which culminated with an Andy Johnson touchdown run to give the Bulldogs a 17–10 lead with 4:24 in the third. The Terrapins narrowed the margin on two Mike Mayer field goals in the final quarter to make it a one-point game with seven minutes remaining, but they did not get any closer as Georgia held on to win consecutive bowl games for the first time in seven years.

== Aftermath ==
The Terrapins created an ACC dynasty the following season, winning the next three ACC titles, culminating with an appearance in the Cotton Bowl Classic. The Terrapins did not return to the Peach Bowl until 2002. The Bulldogs did not win another bowl game for eight years following this game. Georgia returned to the Peach Bowl in 1989.

== Statistics ==
Statistics	Georgia	Maryland
First downs	11	15
Yards rushing	170	219
Yards passing	114	242
Return yards	135	78
Total yards	419	539
Punts-Average	8-41.3	6-31.8
Fumbles-Lost	2-2	4-3
Interceptions	1	1
Penalties-Yards	1-5	5-63
