= 1973 LSU Tigers football team =

American college football season

1973 LSU Tigers football

Orange Bowl, L 9–16 vs. Penn State
- Conference: Southeastern Conference

Ranking
- Coaches: No. 14
- AP: No. 13
- Record: 9–3 (5–1 SEC)
- Head coach: Charles McClendon (12th season)
- Home stadium: Tiger Stadium

1973 Southeastern Conference football standings
	Conf.					Overall
Team	W		L		T	W		L		T
No. 4 Alabama $	8	–	0	–	0	11	–	1	–	0
No. 13 LSU	5	–	1	–	0	9	–	3	–	0
Ole Miss	4	–	3	–	0	6	–	5	–	0
No. 19 Tennessee	3	–	3	–	0	8	–	4	–	0
Georgia	3	–	4	–	0	7	–	4	–	1
Florida	3	–	4	–	0	7	–	5	–	0
Kentucky	3	–	4	–	0	5	–	6	–	0
Auburn	2	–	5	–	0	6	–	6	–	0
Mississippi State	2	–	5	–	0	4	–	5	–	2
Vanderbilt	1	–	5	–	0	5	–	6	–	0
$ – Conference champion; Rankings from AP Poll

The 1973 LSU Tigers football team represented Louisiana State University (LSU) as a member of the Southeastern Conference (SEC) during the 1973 NCAA Division I football season. Led by 12th-year head coach Charles McClendon, the Tigers compiled an overall record of 9–3, with a mark of 5–1 in conference play, and finished second in the SEC.

After winning its first nine games, LSU accepted a bid to the Orange Bowl to face undefeated Penn State, which was on its way to its third undefeated season in six years.

The Orange Bowl's gamble backfired badly when the Tigers lost to Alabama on Thanksgiving night at home, then to Tulane in New Orleans, the Green Wave's first over its in-state rival since 1948. The Tigers' skid continued on New Year's night with a 16-9 loss to the Nittany Lions, foreshadowing a downturn which saw LSU post non-winning records in 1974 and 1975.

The game vs. Alabama would be the last non-Friday or Saturday game in Baton Rouge until the 2005 game vs. Tennessee was moved from Saturday to Monday due to the threat of Hurricane Rita.

== Schedule ==
Date	Opponent	Rank	Site	TV	Result	Attendance	Source
September 15	No. 10 Colorado*	No. 15	Tiger Stadium; Baton Rouge, LA		W 17–6	71,239	
September 22	Texas A&M*	No. 11	Tiger Stadium; Baton Rouge, LA (rivalry)		W 28–23	68,394	
September 29	Rice*	No. 10	Tiger Stadium; Baton Rouge, LA		W 24–9	66,226	
October 6	Florida	No. 10	Tiger Stadium; Baton Rouge, LA (rivalry)		W 24–3	66,974	
October 13	at Auburn	No. 10	Jordan-Hare Stadium; Auburn, AL (rivalry)		W 20–6	64,331	
October 20	Kentucky	No. 9	Tiger Stadium; Baton Rouge, LA		W 28–21	66,991	
October 27	at South Carolina*	No. 9	Williams–Brice Stadium; Columbia, SC		W 33–29	51,039	
November 3	at Ole Miss	No. 7	Mississippi Veterans Memorial Stadium; Jackson, MS (rivalry)	ABC	W 51–14	47,222	
November 17	Mississippi State	No. 7	Tiger Stadium; Baton Rouge, LA (rivalry)		W 26–7	66,536	
November 22	No. 2 Alabama	No. 7	Tiger Stadium; Baton Rouge, LA (rivalry)	ABC	L 7–21	67,748	
December 1	at Tulane*	No. 8	Tulane Stadium; New Orleans, LA (Battle for the Rag)		L 0–14	86,598	
January 1, 1974	vs. No. 6 Penn State*	No. 13	Miami Orange Bowl; Miami, FL (Orange Bowl)	NBC	L 9–16	60,477	
*Non-conference game; Rankings from AP Poll released prior to the game

== Roster ==
1973 LSU Tigers football team roster
Players
Coaches
Offense

Pos.	#	Name	Class
RB		Ken Addy
OL		Doug Boutte
TE	89	Brad Boyd	Jr
OL		Richard Brooks
QB	9	Billy Broussard	Jr
OL		Clay Cain
WR	3	Al Coffee	Sr
RB	48	Brad Davis	Jr
TE		Bo Dunphy
WR		Joe Fakier	Sr
OL		Russel Heald
RB		Lora Hinton
WR		Norm Hodgins
WR		Ben Jones
OL		Logan Killen
G	64	Tyler LaFauci	Sr
QB	5	Mike Miley	Jr
RB		Terry Robiskie	Fr
RB		Don Roger
RB		Steve Rogers	Jr
WR		Richard Romain
TE		Leon Thompson
RB		Brian Zeringue

Defense

Pos.	#	Name	Class
LB	99	Ken Bordelon	So
DB		Dale Cangelosi
LB	55	Warren Capone	Sr
DL		Steve Cassidy
LB		Gary Champagne
DL		Ron Daily
DB		Rand Dennis
DL	77	A.J. Duhe	Fr
LB	80	Bo Harris	Jr
DB		Norm Hodgins	Sr
DE	91	Binks Miciotto	Sr
DB		Mike Pike
DB	17	Frank Racine	Sr
CB	29	Mike Williams	Jr

Special teams

Pos.	#	Name	Class
K	8	Rusty Jackson	Jr

Head coach

- Charles McClendon

Coordinators/assistant coaches

Legend

- (C) Team captain
- (S) Suspended
- (I) Ineligible
- Injured
- Redshirt

Roster
