= 1973 NCAA Division I football season =

American college football season

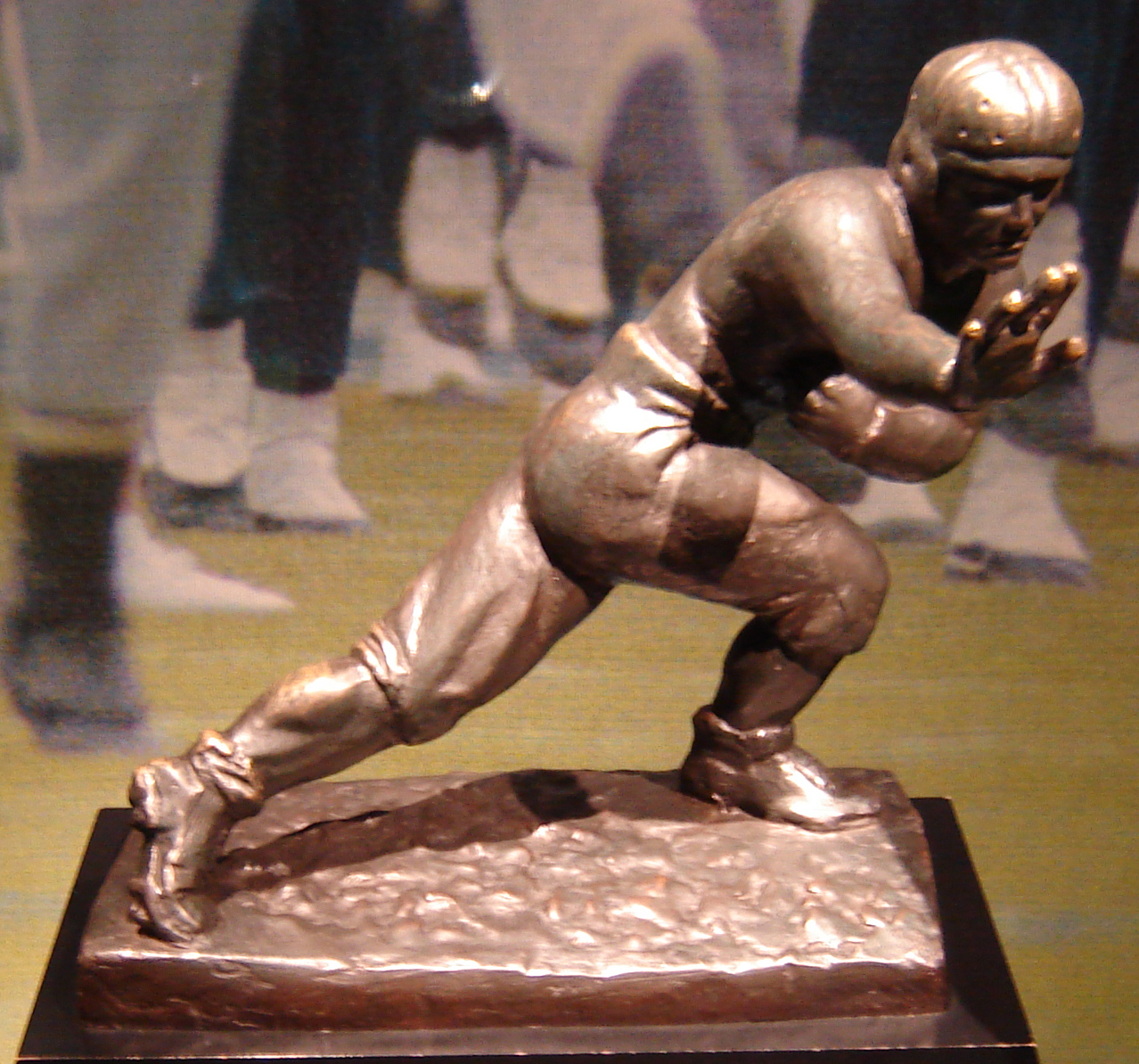
- The Heisman Trophy awarded to John Cappelletti
- Total No. of teams: 126
- Preseason AP No. 1: USC
- Regular season: September 1 – December 1, 1973
- Number of bowls: 11
- Bowl games: December 17, 1973 – January 1, 1974
- Champion(s): Notre Dame (AP, FWAA, NFF); Alabama (Coaches)
- Heisman: Penn State halfback John Cappelletti

The 1973 NCAA Division I football season was the first for the NCAA's current three-division structure. Effective with the 1973–74 academic year, schools formerly in the NCAA "University Division" were classified as Division I (later subdivided for football only in 1978 (I-A and I-AA) and renamed in 2006 into today's Division I FBS and FCS). Schools in the former "College Division" were classified into Division II, which allowed fewer athletic scholarships than Division I, and Division III, in which athletic scholarships were prohibited.

In its inaugural season, Division I had two NCAA-recognized national champions, and they faced each other at year's end in the Sugar Bowl on New Year's Eve. The New Orleans game matched two unbeaten teams, the Alabama Crimson Tide (11–0), ranked No. 1 by AP and UPI, and the Notre Dame Fighting Irish (10–0), ranked No. 3 by AP and No. 4 by UPI.

While both wire services ranked Alabama first at the end of the regular season, the final AP poll was after the bowl games. By agreement with the American Football Coaches' Association, however, UPI bestowed its championship before the postseason bowl games, and Alabama was crowned champion by UPI on December 4. UPI ranked Notre Dame fourth: one coach had given the Irish a first place vote, compared to 21 for Alabama. (In the next season, the final coaches' poll was after the bowls.)

In a game where the lead changed six times, Notre Dame won by a single point, 24–23, to claim the AP national championship. During the 20th century, the NCAA had no playoff for major college football teams that would become Division I-A in 1978. The NCAA Football Guide, however, did note an "unofficial national champion" based on the top ranked teams in the "wire service" (AP and UPI) polls. The "writers' poll" by Associated Press (AP) was the most popular, followed by the "coaches' poll" by United Press International) (UPI). In 1973, the UPI issued its final poll before the bowls, but the AP Trophy was withheld until the postseason was completed. The AP poll in 1973 consisted of the votes of as many as 63 sportswriters and broadcasters, though not all of them voted in every poll. UPI's voting was made by 34 coaches. With their votes, those polled gave their opinions of the ten best teams. Under a point system of 20 points for first place, 19 for second, etc., the "overall" ranking was determined.

== Conference and program changes ==
School	1972 Conference	1973 Conference
Memphis State Tigers	Missouri Valley	Independent
Abilene Christian Wildcats	Southland	Lone Star (D-II)
UC Santa Barbara Gauchos	PCAA	Dropped Football

== September ==
- In the preseason poll released on September 3, the defending champion USC Trojans were ranked first by 55 of the 63 voters, followed by Ohio State, Texas, Nebraska and Michigan.
- September 8: No. 4 Nebraska, led by new head coach Tom Osborne, beat No. 10 UCLA 40–13, but most other teams had not yet opened the season. The next poll featured No. 1 USC, No. 2 Nebraska, No. 3 Ohio State, No. 4 Texas, and No. 5 Michigan.
- September 15: No. 1 USC beat Arkansas 17–0. No. 2 Nebraska and No. 4 Texas were idle. No. 3 Ohio State beat Minnesota 56–7 and No. 5 Michigan beat Iowa 31–7. No. 6 Alabama, which beat California 66–0 in Birmingham, rose up in the next poll: No. 1 USC, No. 2 Nebraska, No. 3 Ohio State, No. 4 Alabama, and No. 5 Michigan.
- September 22: No. 1 USC beat Georgia Tech at Atlanta 23–6, and No. 2 Nebraska beat No. 14 North Carolina State 31–14. No. 3 Ohio State was idle. No. 4 Alabama won at Kentucky 28–14, while No. 5 Michigan beat Stanford 47–10. The next poll featured No. 1 USC, No. 2 Nebraska, No. 3 Ohio State, No. 4 Michigan, and No. 5 Alabama.
- September 29: No. 1 USC was tied by No. 8 Oklahoma, helmed by new coach Barry Switzer, 7–7. No. 2 Nebraska beat Wisconsin 20–16. No. 3 Ohio State beat TCU 37–3. No. 4 Michigan beat Navy 14–0. No. 5 Alabama won at Vanderbilt, 44–0. In the next poll, the Buckeyes rose to first place: No. 1 Ohio State, No. 2 Nebraska, No. 3 Alabama, No. 4 USC, and No. 5 Michigan.

== October ==
- October 6: No. 1 Ohio State beat Washington State 27–3. No. 2 Nebraska won at Minnesota 48–7. No. 3 Alabama beat Georgia at home, 28–14. No. 4 USC won at Oregon State, 21–7. No. 5 Michigan beat Oregon 24–0. The top five remained the same.
- October 13: No. 1 Ohio State won at Wisconsin 24–0. No. 2 Nebraska lost at No. 12 Missouri 13–12. No. 3 Alabama won at Florida 35–14. No. 4 USC beat Washington State 46–35, but fell out of the top five. No. 5 Michigan won at Michigan State, 31–0. No. 6 Oklahoma beat No. 13 Texas 52–13 in Dallas. No. 7 Penn State beat visiting Army, 54–3. The next poll featured No. 1 Ohio State, No. 2 Alabama, No. 3 Oklahoma, No. 4 Michigan, and No. 5 Penn State.
- October 20: No. 1 Ohio State won at Indiana 37–7. No. 2 Alabama beat No. 10 Tennessee at Birmingham, 42–21. No. 3 Oklahoma beat No. 16 Colorado 34–7. No. 4 Michigan beat Wisconsin 35–6. No. 5 Penn State won at Syracuse 49–6. The top five remained unchanged.
- October 27: No. 1 Ohio State beat Northwestern 60–0. No. 2 Alabama crushed Virginia Tech at home, 77–6. No. 3 Oklahoma won at Kansas State 56–14. No. 4 Michigan won at Minnesota 31–0. No. 5 Penn State crushed West Virginia 62–14 but still fell out of the top five when No. 8 Notre Dame won 23–14 over No. 6 USC. The next poll featured No. 1 Ohio State, No. 2 Alabama, No. 3 Oklahoma, No. 4 Michigan, and No. 5 Notre Dame.

== November ==
- November 3: No. 1 Ohio State won at Illinois 30–0. No. 2 Alabama beat Mississippi State in Jackson, 35–0. No. 3 Oklahoma beat Iowa State 34–17. No. 4 Michigan beat Indiana 49–13. No. 5 Notre Dame beat Navy 44–7. The top five remained the same.
- November 10: No. 1 Ohio State recorded its third shutout, a 35–0 win over visiting Michigan State. No. 2 Alabama was idle. No. 3 Oklahoma won at No. 10 Missouri 31–3. No. 4 Michigan beat Illinois 21–6. No. 5 Notre Dame won at No. 20 Pittsburgh 31–10. The top five again remained the same.
- November 17: No. 1 Ohio State beat Iowa 55–13. No. 2 Alabama beat Miami (Florida) at home, 43–13. No. 3 Oklahoma beat No. 18 Kansas 48–20. No. 4 Michigan won at Purdue, 34–9. No. 5 Notre Dame was idle. Once again, the top five remained the same.
- November 22–24: On Thanksgiving Day, a pair of unbeaten teams played for the SEC title, with No. 2 Alabama beating No. 7 LSU 21–7. Meanwhile, No. 5 Notre Dame beat Air Force 48–15. The next day, No. 3 Oklahoma beat No. 10 Nebraska 27–0 to clinch the Big 8 championship. The big matchup was on Saturday in Ann Arbor, Michigan, where No. 1 Ohio State (9–0) and No. 4 Michigan (10–0) continued "The Ten Year War" with a game for the Big Ten title and a Rose Bowl bid. The two teams played to a 10–10 tie. The next day, Big Ten Conference athletic directors voted to send Ohio State to the Rose Bowl against No. 9 USC (which had just beaten No. 8 UCLA 23−13 to win the Pac-8 championship), due in large part to the broken clavicle suffered by Michigan quarterback Dennis Franklin in the game. Alabama, still unbeaten and untied, took over the top spot in the next poll: No. 1 Alabama, No. 2 Oklahoma, No. 3 Ohio State, No. 4 Michigan, and No. 5 Notre Dame.

== December ==
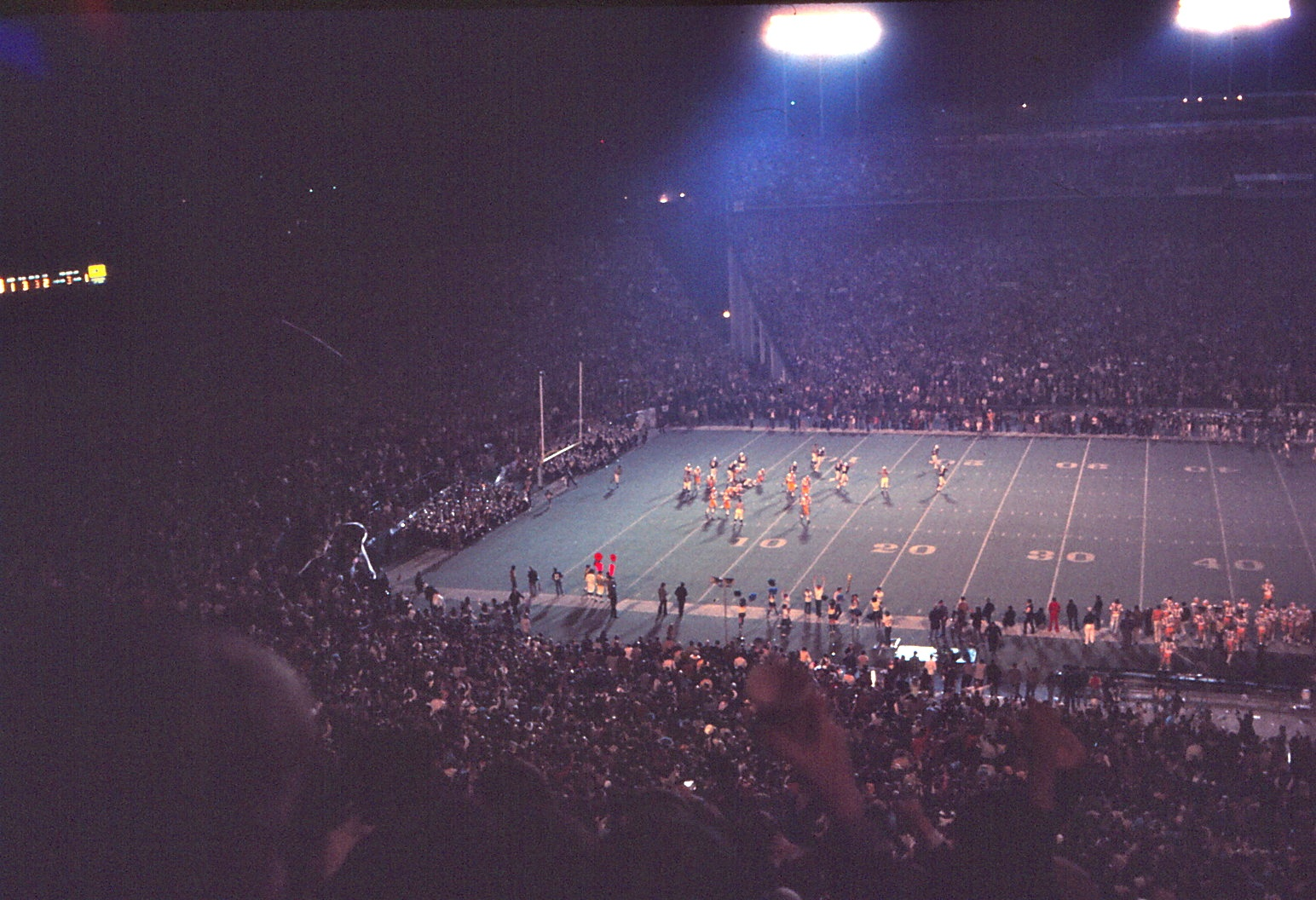
LSU at Tulane, December 1

- December 1: No. 1 Alabama shut out Auburn in Birmingham 35–0, avenging Auburn's shocking upset in the previous year, to close the regular season with an 11–0 record. No. 2 Oklahoma won at Oklahoma State 45–18 to finish 10–0–1. No. 3 Ohio State and No. 4 Michigan had already finished their season, tied against each other but undefeated against all other opponents. No. 5 Notre Dame won at Miami (Florida) 44–0, ending the regular season at 10−0.
- Elsewhere, Bluebonnet Bowl-bound Tulane defeated No. 8 LSU 14–0 to end a 25–year winless drought in the Battle for the Rag in the final meeting at Tulane Stadium, leaving both the Green Wave and Bayou Bengals 9–2. Also, the 4–7 Navy Midshipmen trounced the Army Cadets 51–0. The Cadets completed one of their worst season in their football program history, with an imperfect 0–10 record.

In the final regular season poll, the top six schools were unbeaten: No. 1 Alabama (11–0), No. 2 Oklahoma (10–0–1), No. 3 Notre Dame (10–0), No. 4 Ohio State (9–0–1), No. 5 Michigan (10–0–1), and No. 6 Penn State (11–0). The other major college unbeaten, Miami (Ohio) (10–0), was No. 15.

Alabama and Notre Dame accepted invitations to play in the Sugar Bowl for the national championship. Oklahoma was on probation for having used an ineligible player (Kerry Jackson) in three 1972 games and was ineligible to play in a bowl game; therefore, the Orange Bowl featured independent Penn State and SEC runner-up LSU (No. 13 in the final poll) rather than a Big 8 team. Because Big Ten rules allowed only one team to participate in postseason play, Michigan was forced to stay home while Ohio State matched up against No. 7 USC in the Rose Bowl. No. 11 Texas Tech had an impressive 10−1 record, but an early-season loss to Texas cost the Red Raiders the SWC championship and the conference's automatic Cotton Bowl bid. The eighth-ranked Longhorns struggled in non-conference play but blew through their SWC opponents for their sixth straight title, with an incredible 40−2 conference record since 1968. They would play the Big 8 runner-up, No. 12 Nebraska, in the Cotton Bowl.

== Rule changes ==
- Each team may use its own legal ball when it is in possession.
- Free substitution is allowed, however substitutes both checking in and leaving the field of play must do so through their own team areas, and are not required to stay in or leave for one play. This change was rescinded in the 1974 season.
- The fair catch signal is standardized as waving one arm side to side before the ball is caught. Any other signal (including shielding of the eyes) is considered invalid, and players making a fair catch with either a valid or invalid signal are protected from being tackled or blocked. Previously, receivers making an invalid signal were not afforded any protection.
- All players are required to wear a mouth guard and a fully buckled chin strap. Violators must leave the field until the violation is corrected.
- If an illegal forward pass is completed in the end zone (whether to an eligible or ineligible receiver), the ball is dead and the penalty enforced.

== Conference standings ==
1973 Atlantic Coast Conference football standings
	Conf.					Overall
Team	W		L		T	W		L		T
No. 16 NC State $	6	–	0	–	0	9	–	3	–	0
No. 20 Maryland	5	–	1	–	0	8	–	4	–	0
Clemson	4	–	2	–	0	5	–	6	–	0
Virginia	3	–	3	–	0	4	–	7	–	0
Duke	1	–	4	–	1	2	–	8	–	1
North Carolina	1	–	5	–	0	4	–	7	–	0
Wake Forest	0	–	5	–	1	1	–	9	–	1
$ – Conference champion; Rankings from AP Poll

1973 Big Eight Conference football standings
	Conf.					Overall
Team	W		L		T	W		L		T
No. 3 Oklahoma $	7	–	0	–	0	10	–	0	–	1
No. 7 Nebraska	4	–	2	–	1	9	–	2	–	1
No. 18 Kansas	4	–	2	–	1	7	–	4	–	1
No. 17 Missouri	3	–	4	–	0	8	–	4	–	0
Oklahoma State	2	–	3	–	2	5	–	4	–	2
Colorado	2	–	5	–	0	5	–	6	–	0
Kansas State	2	–	5	–	0	5	–	6	–	0
Iowa State	2	–	5	–	0	4	–	7	–	0
$ – Conference champion; Rankings from AP Poll

1973 Big Sky Conference football standings
	Conf.					Overall
Team	W		L		T	W		L		T
No. 5 Boise State $^	6	–	0	–	0	10	–	3	–	0
Montana State	5	–	1	–	0	7	–	4	–	0
Idaho	3	–	2	–	0	4	–	7	–	0
Northern Arizona	2	–	3	–	0	4	–	6	–	0
Montana	2	–	4	–	0	4	–	6	–	0
Weber State	2	–	4	–	0	3	–	8	–	0
Idaho State	0	–	6	–	0	2	–	9	–	0
$ – Conference champion; ^ – NCAA Division II playoff participant; Idaho was classified as Division I. All the other teams were classified as Division II.; Rankings from AP small college poll

1973 Big Ten Conference football standings
	Conf.					Overall
Team	W		L		T	W		L		T
No. 2 Ohio State +	7	–	0	–	1	10	–	0	–	1
No. 6 Michigan +	7	–	0	–	1	10	–	0	–	1
Minnesota	6	–	2	–	0	7	–	4	–	0
Illinois	4	–	4	–	0	5	–	6	–	0
Michigan State	4	–	4	–	0	5	–	6	–	0
Purdue	4	–	4	–	0	5	–	6	–	0
Northwestern	4	–	4	–	0	4	–	7	–	0
Wisconsin	3	–	5	–	0	4	–	7	–	0
Indiana	0	–	8	–	0	2	–	9	–	0
Iowa	0	–	8	–	0	0	–	11	–	0
+ – Conference co-champions; Rankings from AP Poll

1973 Ivy League football standings
	Conf.					Overall
Team	W		L		T	W		L		T
Dartmouth $	6	–	1	–	0	6	–	3	–	0
Harvard	5	–	2	–	0	7	–	2	–	0
Penn	5	–	2	–	0	6	–	3	–	0
Yale	5	–	2	–	0	6	–	3	–	0
Brown	4	–	3	–	0	4	–	3	–	1
Cornell	2	–	5	–	0	3	–	5	–	1
Columbia	1	–	6	–	0	1	–	7	–	1
Princeton	0	–	7	–	0	1	–	8	–	0
$ – Conference champion

1973 Mid-American Conference football standings
	Conf.					Overall
Team	W		L		T	W		L		T
No. 15 Miami (OH) $	5	–	0	–	0	11	–	0	–	0
Kent State	4	–	1	–	0	9	–	2	–	0
Bowling Green	2	–	3	–	0	7	–	3	–	0
Ohio	2	–	3	–	0	5	–	5	–	0
Western Michigan	1	–	4	–	0	6	–	5	–	0
Toledo	1	–	4	–	0	3	–	8	–	0
$ – Conference champion; Rankings from AP Poll

1973 Missouri Valley Conference football standings
	Conf.					Overall
Team	W		L		T	W		L		T
Tulsa +	5	–	1	–	0	6	–	5	–	0
North Texas State +	5	–	1	–	0	5	–	5	–	1
Louisville	3	–	2	–	0	5	–	6	–	0
New Mexico State	3	–	2	–	0	5	–	6	–	0
Wichita State	2	–	4	–	0	4	–	7	–	0
Drake	1	–	5	–	0	2	–	9	–	0
West Texas State	1	–	5	–	0	2	–	9	–	0
+ – Conference co-champions

1973 Pacific Coast Athletic Association football standings
	Conf.					Overall
Team	W		L		T	W		L		T
San Diego State $	3	–	0	–	1	9	–	1	–	1
San Jose State	2	–	0	–	2	5	–	4	–	2
Pacific (CA)	2	–	1	–	1	7	–	2	–	1
Fresno State	1	–	3	–	0	2	–	9	–	0
Long Beach State	0	–	4	–	0	1	–	9	–	1
$ – Conference champion

1973 Pacific-8 Conference football standings
	Conf.					Overall
Team	W		L		T	W		L		T
No. 8 USC $	7	–	0	–	0	9	–	2	–	1
No. 12 UCLA	6	–	1	–	0	9	–	2	–	0
Stanford	5	–	2	–	0	7	–	4	–	0
Washington State	4	–	3	–	0	5	–	6	–	0
California	2	–	5	–	0	4	–	7	–	0
Oregon	2	–	5	–	0	2	–	9	–	0
Oregon State	2	–	5	–	0	2	–	9	–	0
Washington	0	–	7	–	0	2	–	9	–	0
$ – Conference champion; Rankings from AP Poll

1973 Southern Conference football standings
	Conf.					Overall
Team	W		L		T	W		L		T
East Carolina $	7	–	0	–	0	9	–	2	–	0
Richmond	5	–	1	–	0	8	–	2	–	0
William & Mary	3	–	2	–	0	6	–	5	–	0
Furman	3	–	3	–	0	7	–	4	–	0
Appalachian State	2	–	2	–	0	3	–	7	–	1
VMI	2	–	4	–	0	2	–	9	–	0
Davidson	1	–	6	–	0	2	–	8	–	0
The Citadel	1	–	6	–	0	3	–	8	–	0
$ – Conference champion

1973 Southeastern Conference football standings
	Conf.					Overall
Team	W		L		T	W		L		T
No. 4 Alabama $	8	–	0	–	0	11	–	1	–	0
No. 13 LSU	5	–	1	–	0	9	–	3	–	0
Ole Miss	4	–	3	–	0	6	–	5	–	0
No. 19 Tennessee	3	–	3	–	0	8	–	4	–	0
Georgia	3	–	4	–	0	7	–	4	–	1
Florida	3	–	4	–	0	7	–	5	–	0
Kentucky	3	–	4	–	0	5	–	6	–	0
Auburn	2	–	5	–	0	6	–	6	–	0
Mississippi State	2	–	5	–	0	4	–	5	–	2
Vanderbilt	1	–	5	–	0	5	–	6	–	0
$ – Conference champion; Rankings from AP Poll

1973 Southwest Conference football standings
	Conf.					Overall
Team	W		L		T	W		L		T
No. 14 Texas $	7	–	0	–	0	8	–	3	–	0
No. 11 Texas Tech	6	–	1	–	0	11	–	1	–	0
Rice	4	–	3	–	0	5	–	6	–	0
SMU	3	–	3	–	1	6	–	4	–	1
Arkansas	3	–	3	–	1	5	–	5	–	1
Texas A&M	3	–	4	–	0	5	–	6	–	0
TCU	1	–	6	–	0	3	–	8	–	0
Baylor	0	–	7	–	0	2	–	9	–	0
$ – Conference champion; Rankings from AP Poll

1973 Western Athletic Conference football standings
	Conf.					Overall
Team	W		L		T	W		L		T
No. 9 Arizona State +	6	–	1	–	0	11	–	1	–	0
Arizona +	6	–	1	–	0	8	–	3	–	0
Utah	4	–	2	–	0	7	–	5	–	0
BYU	3	–	4	–	0	5	–	6	–	0
New Mexico	3	–	4	–	0	4	–	7	–	0
Wyoming	3	–	4	–	0	4	–	7	–	0
Colorado State	2	–	4	–	0	5	–	6	–	0
UTEP	0	–	7	–	0	0	–	11	–	0
+ – Conference co-champions; Rankings from AP Poll

1973 NCAA Division I independents football records
	Conf.			Overall
Team	W	L	T	W		L		T
No. 1 Notre Dame		–		11	–	0	–	0
No. 5 Penn State		–		12	–	0	–	0
No. 9 Houston		–		11	–	1	–	0
Temple		–		9	–	1	–	0
No. 20 Tulane		–		9	–	3	–	0
Memphis State		–		8	–	3	–	0
Tampa		–		8	–	3	–	0
Boston College		–		7	–	4	–	0
South Carolina		–		7	–	4	–	0
Utah State		–		7	–	4	–	0
Air Force		–		6	–	4	–	0
Southern Miss		–		6	–	4	–	1
Northern Illinois		–		6	–	5	–	0
Rutgers		–		6	–	5	–	0
West Virginia		–		6	–	5	–	0
Pittsburgh		–		6	–	5	–	1
Colgate		–		5	–	5	–	0
Dayton		–		5	–	5	–	1
Xavier		–		5	–	5	–	1
Georgia Tech		–		5	–	6	–	0
Holy Cross		–		5	–	6	–	0
Miami (FL)		–		5	–	6	–	0
Cincinnati		–		4	–	7	–	0
Marshall		–		4	–	7	–	0
Navy		–		4	–	7	–	0
Southern Illinois		–		3	–	7	–	1
Villanova		–		3	–	8	–	0
Syracuse		–		2	–	9	–	0
Virginia Tech		–		2	–	9	–	0
Army		–		0	–	10	–	0
Florida State		–		0	–	11	–	0
Rankings from AP Poll

== Bowl games ==
=== Major bowls ===
Monday, December 31, 1973
Tuesday, January 1, 1974

Alabama and Notre Dame had never met in a college football game before their encounter in the Sugar Bowl, which was played on New Year's Eve at Tulane Stadium, with kickoff at 7:15 pm CST. Two legendary coaches, Bear Bryant and Ara Parseghian brought their teams to New Orleans, and the game was a thriller. The Irish scored first, but missed the extra point. After Alabama took a 7–6 lead, freshman Al Hunter returned the ensuing kickoff 93 yards for a touchdown, and a two-point conversion put Notre Dame up 14–7. Alabama went ahead 17–14 in the third, but a fumble on their own 12-yard line gave the Irish a chance to make it 21–17. In the fourth quarter, Bama got back the lead on a trick play, as quarterback Richard Todd handed off to running back, Mike Stock, who then fired a touchdown pass back to Todd; but Bill Davis, who had made 51 of 53 extra point attempts in his career, was wide right, and the score stayed 23–21. In the final minutes, Notre Dame's Bob Thomas (who had missed the earlier point after try) kicked a 19-yard field goal that gave the team the 24–23 win. Asked whether Notre Dame would be voted No. 1, Coach Parseghian replied, "Certainly. What was the final score?"

BOWL				
SUGAR	No. 3 Notre Dame Fighting Irish	24	No. 1 Alabama Crimson Tide	23
COTTON	No. 12 Nebraska Cornhuskers	19	No. 8 Texas Longhorns	3
ROSE	No. 4 Ohio State Buckeyes	42	No. 7 USC Trojans	21
ORANGE	No. 6 Penn State Nittany Lions	16	No. 13 LSU Tigers	9

The final AP writers' poll was split. Notre Dame received a majority of the first place votes, 33 out of 60, followed by No. 2 Ohio State (11 votes) and No. 3 Oklahoma (16 votes, but fewer points overall). The fourth spot (held by Notre Dame in the final UPI poll) went to Alabama. UPI, who crowned Alabama as national champion at the end of the regular season, would begin holding the coaches' poll after the bowl games beginning with the 1974 season.

=== Other bowls ===
Bowl	City	State	Date	Winner	Score	Runner-up
Sun	El Paso	Texas	December 29	Missouri	34–17	Auburn
Gator	Jacksonville	Florida	December 29	No. 11 Texas Tech	28–19	No. 20 Tennessee
Tangerine	Gainesville	Florida	December 22	No. 15 Miami (Ohio)	16–7	Florida
Astro-Bluebonnet	Houston	Texas	December 29	No. 14 Houston	47–7	No. 17 Tulane
Liberty	Memphis	Tennessee	December 17	No. 16 N.C. State	31–18	No. 19 Kansas
Peach	Atlanta	Georgia	December 28	Georgia	17–16	No. 18 Maryland
Fiesta	Tempe	Arizona	December 21	No. 10 Arizona State	28–7	Pittsburgh

- Prior to the 1975 season, the Big Ten Conference and the Pacific-8 Conference allowed only one postseason participant each, for the Rose Bowl.

== Heisman Trophy ==
Halfback John Cappelletti had the third-best year in Penn State history when he gained 1,117 yards rushing in 1972. As a senior in 1973, he had the second best year in school history rushing for 1,522 yards. In his two-year running career, he gained 100 yards in the thirteen games and had a career total of 2,639 yards and twenty-nine touchdowns for an average of 120 yards per game and 5.1 yards per carry. Cappelletti's acceptance speech on December 13 at the Heisman Dinner (with new Vice President Gerald Ford next to him on the dais) was considered the most moving ever given at these ceremonies, as he honored his 11-year-old brother Joey, who was battling leukemia at the time.

Player	School	Position	1st	2nd	3rd	Total
John Cappelletti	Penn State	HB	229	142	86	1,057
John Hicks	Ohio State	OT	114	64	54	524
Roosevelt Leaks	Texas	RB	74	80	100	482
David Jaynes	Kansas	QB	65	68	63	394
Archie Griffin	Ohio State	RB	45	63	65	326
Randy Gradishar	Ohio State	LB	47	53	35	282
Lucious Selmon	Oklahoma	DT	39	52	29	250
Woody Green	Arizona State	RB	31	55	44	247
Danny White	Arizona State	QB	32	22	26	166
Kermit Johnson	UCLA	RB	24	15	20	122

== See also ==
- 1973 NCAA Division I football rankings
- 1973 College Football All-America Team
- 1973 NCAA Division II football season
- 1973 NCAA Division III football season
