= 1973 Gator Bowl =

American college football game

- 29th Gator Bowl
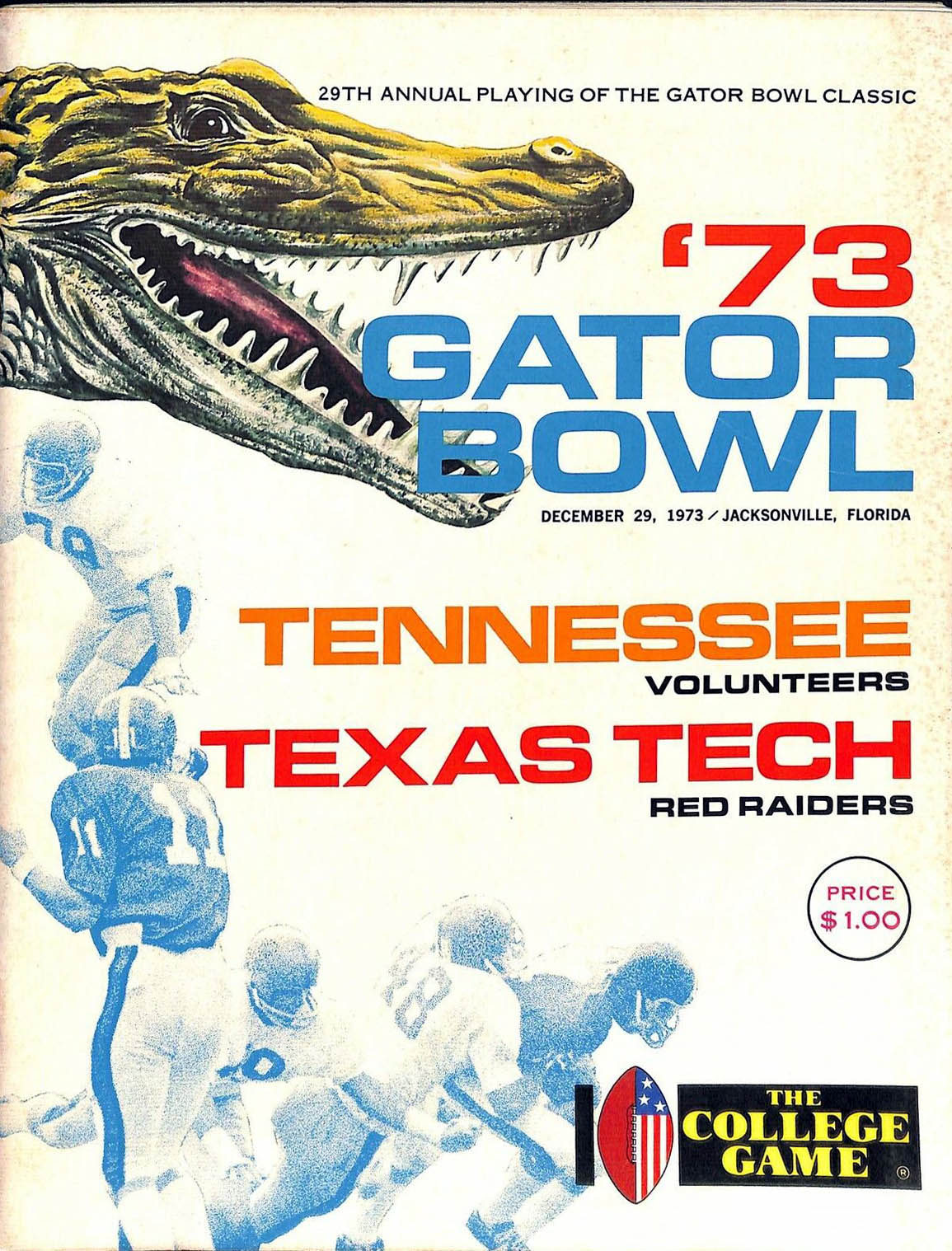
Texas Tech Red Raiders	Tennessee Volunteers
(10–1)	(8–3)
SWC	SEC
28	19
Head coach: Jim Carlen	Head coach: Bill Battle
AP 11	AP 20
	1	2	3	4	Total
Texas Tech	7	7	7	7	28
Tennessee	0	3	10	6	19
- Date: December 29, 1973
- Season: 1973
- Stadium: Gator Bowl Stadium
- Location: Jacksonville, Florida
- MVP: QB Joe Barnes (Texas Tech); TB Haskel Stanback (Tennessee)
- Attendance: 62,109

The 1973 Gator Bowl was an American college football bowl game played on December 29, 1973, at Gator Bowl Stadium in Jacksonville, Florida. The game pitted the Texas Tech Red Raiders and the Tennessee Volunteers.

== Background ==
The Red Raiders started the season 2–1, losing to #14 Texas in Austin 28–12. They would promptly win the rest of their regular season games, finishing with 10 victories (though not a Southwest Conference title), the first time that happened since 1953, which also culminated in a Gator Bowl appearance. This was their third bowl game in three years along with their first Gator Bowl since 1965.

The Volunteers started the season with five straight victories before facing off against #2 Alabama, which they lost 42–21. A win over TCU was followed by losses to Georgia and Ole Miss that dropped them out of the rankings. Victories over Kentucky and Vanderbilt to end the season got them back into the polls as they limped to a fourth place finish in the Southeastern Conference, though they were invited to a bowl game for the seventh straight year.

== Game summary ==
- Texas Tech – Joe Barnes, 7 yard touchdown run (Don Grimes kick)
- Texas Tech – Lawrence Williams, 79 yard touchdown pass from Barnes (Grimes kick)
- Tennessee – Ricky Townsend, 30 yard field goal
- Tennessee – Haskel Stanback, 5 yard touchdown run (Townsend kick)
- Texas Tech – Andre Tillman, 7 yard touchdown pass from Barnes (Grimes kick)
- Tennessee – Townsend, 37 yard field goal
- Tennessee – Stanback, 7 yard touchdown pass from Condredge Holloway (pass failed)
- Texas Tech – Larry Isaac, 3 yard touchdown run (Grimes kick)

Joe Barnes went 8-of-11 for 154 yards while throwing for two touchdowns and rushing the ball 73 yards on 16 carries for a touchdown as the Red Raiders outran the Volunteers 276 to 153, while turning the ball over only once. Tennessee threw for 190 yards over Tech's 154, but they turned the ball over twice. Haskel Stanback rushed for 95 yards on 19 carries for the Vols.

== Statistics ==
Statistics	Texas Tech	Tennessee
First downs	19	18
Rushing yards	276	153
Passing yards	154	190
Total offense	430	343
Passing	8–11–0	17–28–1
Fumbles–lost	3–1	1–1
Penalties–yards	5–55	1–3
Punts–average	6–41.0	4–41.0

== Aftermath ==
The Red Raiders would make three more bowl games in the decade, though they did not win another bowl game until 1989. The Red Raiders did not return to the Gator Bowl again until 2008. The Volunteers made two more bowl games in the decade, splitting the two games. The Volunteers did not return to the Gator Bowl again until 1994.
