= Don Gaffney =

American football player and politician (born 1954)

Donald G. Gaffney
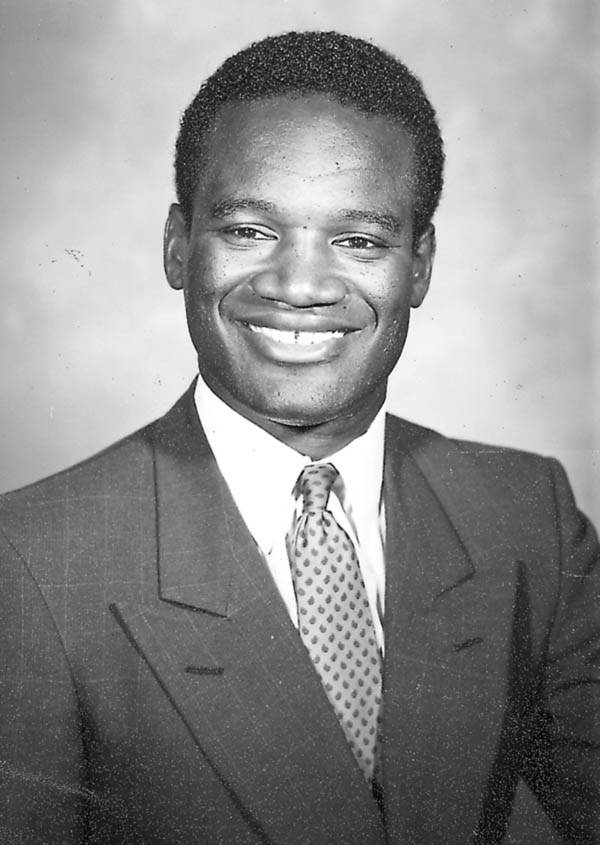

Member of the Florida House of Representatives from the 16th district
- In office 1986–1988
- Preceded by: John Thomas
- Succeeded by: Betty Holzendorf

Personal details
- Born: February 1, 1954 (age 72) Jacksonville, Florida, U.S.
- Party: Democratic
- Education: University of Florida (BS, JD)
- Profession: Businessman, Attorney

Donald G. Gaffney (born February 1, 1954) is an American former college football player and politician. Gaffney was the first African-American to play quarterback for the Florida Gators football team of the University of Florida, and was later elected to the Florida House of Representatives, until he resigned following his conviction for extortion.

== Biography ==
Gaffney was born on February 1, 1954, in Jacksonville, Florida. He was an All-Southeastern Conference (SEC) selection at quarterback, and led the Gators to three bowl games (Tangerine Bowl, Sugar Bowl, and Gator Bowl) as their starting quarterback from 1973 until 1975. His younger brother Derrick Gaffney also had a successful collegiate football career. His brothers Warren and Johnny also played football for the Florida Gators.

Gaffney taught business law at the University of North Florida. He has also worked in the office supply business.

== Political career ==
Gaffney served on the Jacksonville City Council from 1983 until 1986. He was elected to Florida House in 1986.

In 1987 he was accused of mail fraud and extortion in an insurance scam in which he claimed his business was burglarized. He was found guilty and sentenced to two years in prison. He resigned his House seat on April 1, 1988.
