= 1973 Sun Bowl =

American college football game

- 40th Sun Bowl
| Auburn Tigers | Missouri Tigers |
| (6–5) | (7–4) |
| SEC | Big Eight |
| 17 | 34 |
| Head coach: Ralph Jordan | Head coach: Al Onofrio |
| | 1 | 2 | 3 | 4 | Total |
|---|---|---|---|---|---|
| Auburn | 0 | 10 | 7 | 0 | 17 |
| Missouri | 0 | 28 | 6 | 0 | 34 |
- Date: December 29, 1973
- Season: 1973
- Stadium: Sun Bowl
- Location: El Paso, Texas
- MVP: FB Ray Bybee (Missouri)
- Referee: Bill Jennings (Big Eight; split crew: Big Eight, SEC)
- Attendance: 30,127

United States TV coverage
- Network: CBS
- Announcers: Lindsey Nelson & Tom Brookshier

The 1973 Sun Bowl was a college football bowl game that featured the Missouri Tigers and the Auburn Tigers.

== Background ==
Missouri finished fourth in the Big Eight Conference. Auburn lost their final two games to #20 Georgia and #1 Alabama to finish eight in the Southeastern Conference (SEC) for the first time since 1966, although they were invited to a bowl for the sixth straight season. This was Missouri's first Sun Bowl and Auburn's first since 1968.

== Game summary ==
A Missouri fumble on their own 49-yard line gave Auburn great field position, with Roger Pruett kicking a 35-yard field goal to give Auburn a 3–0 lead in the second quarter. When Auburn got the ball back, Rick Neel fumbled at his own 35, giving the ball back to Missouri. Chuck Link took a pitch from quarterback Ray Smith, and he passed the ball 35 yards to tight end John Kelsey for a touchdown to make it 7–3 Missouri. On second down of Auburn's ensuing possession, Wade Whatley fumbled the handoff, giving the ball back to Missouri again, this time giving it to them at the 24. Four plays later, Ray Bybee plunged in for a touchdown to make it 14–3. With 3:08 to go in the half, Missouri scored, this time on a Ray Smith touchdown pass to Kelsey to make it 21v3. Auburn soon moved 80 yards in three minutes, culminating in a Phil Gargis touchdown pass to Thomas Gossom on 4th and goal at the 17 to make it 21–10 with 15 seconds remaining in the half. But on the ensuing kickoff return, John Moseley returned the ball 84 yards for a touchdown to make it 28–10 as the first half expired. A fumble by Gargis on a pitch was recovered at the 35 by Missouri, who responded with a Smith touchdown pass to Jim Sharp to make it 34–10. Auburn scored on a Gargis pass to Gossom from 32 yards out to make it 34–17, but neither team scored for the rest of the game. Ray Bybee rushed the ball 27 times for 127 yards in an MVP effort.

== Scoring summary ==
- Auburn – Pruett 35-yard field goal
- Missouri – Kelsey 35-yard pass from Link (Hill kick)
- Missouri – Bybee 2-yard run (Hill kick)
- Missouri – Kelsey 2-yard pass from Smith (Hill kick)
- Auburn – Gossom 17-yard pass from Gargis (Pruett kick)
- Missouri – Moseley 84-yard kickoff return (Hill kick)
- Missouri – Sharp 15-yard pass from Smith (kick failed)
- Auburn – Gossom 32-yard pass from Gargis (Pruett kick)

== Aftermath ==
Missouri returned to the Sun Bowl in 2006, while Auburn has not returned since this game.

== Statistics ==
| Statistics | Missouri | Auburn |
|---|---|---|
| First downs | 20 | 11 |
| Rushing yards | 295 | 113 |
| Passing yards | 95 | 120 |
| Passing (C–A–I) | 8–14–1 | 7–15–1 |
| Total offense | 390 | 233 |
| Fumbles–lost | 4–1 | 5–4 |
| Penalties–yards | 2–29 | 1–5 |
| Punts–average | 6–37.2 | 6–46.0 |
| Punt returns-Yards | 3–12 | 4–42 |
