= 1973 Alabama Crimson Tide football team =

American college football season

1973 Alabama Crimson Tide football

Coaches Poll national champion SEC champion

Sugar Bowl, L 23–24 vs. Notre Dame
- Conference: Southeastern Conference

Ranking
- Coaches: No. 1
- AP: No. 4
- Record: 11–1 (8–0 SEC)
- Head coach: Bear Bryant (16th season)
- Offensive scheme: Wishbone
- Base defense: 5–2
- Captains: Wilbur Jackson; Chuck Strickland
- Home stadium: Denny Stadium; Legion Field

1973 Southeastern Conference football standings
	Conf.					Overall
Team	W		L		T	W		L		T
No. 4 Alabama $	8	–	0	–	0	11	–	1	–	0
No. 13 LSU	5	–	1	–	0	9	–	3	–	0
Ole Miss	4	–	3	–	0	6	–	5	–	0
No. 19 Tennessee	3	–	3	–	0	8	–	4	–	0
Georgia	3	–	4	–	0	7	–	4	–	1
Florida	3	–	4	–	0	7	–	5	–	0
Kentucky	3	–	4	–	0	5	–	6	–	0
Auburn	2	–	5	–	0	6	–	6	–	0
Mississippi State	2	–	5	–	0	4	–	5	–	2
Vanderbilt	1	–	5	–	0	5	–	6	–	0
$ – Conference champion; Rankings from AP Poll

The 1973 Alabama Crimson Tide football team (variously "Alabama", "UA" or "Bama") represented the University of Alabama in the 1973 NCAA Division I football season. It was the Crimson Tide's 79th overall and 40th season as a member of the Southeastern Conference (SEC). The team was led by head coach Bear Bryant, in his 16th year at his alma mater and 29th overall as a head coach, and played their home games at Denny Stadium in Tuscaloosa and Legion Field in Birmingham, Alabama. They finished season with eleven wins and one loss (11–1 overall, 8–0 in the SEC), as SEC champions and with a loss to Notre Dame in the Sugar Bowl.

Although they lost in the Sugar Bowl, Alabama was recognized as national champions by the Coaches' Poll (UPI) as their selection was made prior to bowl season at the time (the UPI started to issue its final poll after the bowl games beginning in 1974). Notre Dame was awarded the national championship by the Associated Press (AP).

The Crimson Tide opened the season with a victory at Birmingham over California. The next week, they defeated Kentucky in what was Bryant's first game in Lexington since he resigned as head coach of the Wildcats after their 1953 season. After they defeated Vanderbilt for their second shutout of the season, Alabama defeated Georgia in the first Tuscaloosa game of the season and followed that with a victory at Florida before what was the largest crowd to date at Florida Field.

Against Tennessee, Alabama defeated their rivals behind three fourth quarter touchdowns and extended their record to 6–0. The following week, the Crimson Tide shattered numerous offensive records with their 77–6 blowout win over Virginia Tech. After victories over both Mississippi State at Jackson and Miami on homecoming, Alabama then captured their third consecutive SEC championship with their win over LSU. Alabama closed the regular season with a win over Auburn in the Iron Bowl, but lost to Notre Dame in the Sugar Bowl.

== Schedule ==
Date	Opponent	Rank	Site	TV	Result	Attendance
September 15	California*	No. 6	Legion Field; Birmingham, AL		W 66–0	71,119
September 22	at Kentucky	No. 4	Commonwealth Stadium; Lexington, KY		W 28–14	53,209
September 29	at Vanderbilt	No. 5	Dudley Field; Nashville, TN		W 44–0	34,500
October 6	Georgia	No. 3	Denny Stadium; Tuscaloosa, AL (rivalry)		W 28–14	57,790
October 13	at Florida	No. 3	Florida Field; Gainesville, FL (rivalry)		W 35–14	64,864
October 20	No. 10 Tennessee	No. 2	Legion Field; Birmingham, AL (Third Saturday in October)	ABC	W 42–21	72,226
October 27	Virginia Tech*	No. 2	Denny Stadium; Tuscaloosa, AL		W 77–6	57,009
November 3	at Mississippi State	No. 2	Mississippi Veterans Memorial Stadium; Jackson, MS (rivalry)		W 35–0	46,000
November 17	Miami (FL)*^{†}	No. 2	Denny Stadium; Tuscaloosa, AL		W 43–13	58,404
November 22	at No. 7 LSU	No. 2	Tiger Stadium; Baton Rouge, LA (rivalry)	ABC	W 21–7	67,748
December 1	vs. Auburn	No. 1	Legion Field; Birmingham, AL (Iron Bowl)	ABC	W 35–0	69,418
December 31	vs. No. 3 Notre Dame*	No. 1	Tulane Stadium; New Orleans, LA (Sugar Bowl)	ABC	L 23–24	85,161
*Non-conference game; ^{†}Homecoming; Rankings from AP Poll Poll released prior to the game; Source:

== Game summaries ==
=== California ===
Team	1	2	3	4	Total
California	0	0	0	0	0
• #6 Alabama	14	7	17	28	66

- Date: September 15
- Location: Legion Field
  Birmingham, AL
- Game start: 7:30 pm
- Elapsed time: 2:35
- Game attendance: 71,119
- Game weather: 79°, wind NW 7 mph, partly cloudy

Scoring summary
1	5:19	Alabama	Wilbur Jackson 2-yard run (Bill Davis kick)	Alabama 7–0
1	1:16	Alabama	Johnny Sharpless 32-yard pass from Gary Rutledge (Bill Davis kick)	Alabama 14–0
2	5:25	Alabama	George Pugh 16-yard pass from Richard Todd (Bill Davis kick)	Alabama 21–0
3	7:37	Alabama	James Taylor 3-yard run (Bill Davis kick)	Alabama 28–0
3	4:04	Alabama	Bill Davis 21-yard field goal	Alabama 31–0
3	0:34	Alabama	Darrell Owen 46-yard pass from Richard Todd (Bill Davis kick)	Alabama 38–0
4	12:14	Alabama	Paul Harris recovered fumble (Bill Davis kick)	Alabama 45–0
4	10:01	Alabama	John Boles 18-yard run (Bill Davis kick)	Alabama 52–0
4	5:34	Alabama	Willie Shelby 32-yard run (Bill Davis kick)	Alabama 59–0
4	0:45	Alabama	Willie Shelby 5-yard run (Ron Dichiara kick)	Alabama 66–0

As they entered the 1973 season, Alabama was ranked as the No. 6 team in the first AP Poll prior to their season opener against California. Playing in the evening at Legion Field, the Crimson Tide utilized 70 players and set a school record for total offense with this 66–0 shutout of the Golden Bears. Alabama took a 14–0 first quarter lead behind touchdowns scored on a two-yard Wilbur Jackson run and a 32-yard pass from Gary Rutledge to Johnny Sharpless. They then extended their lead to 21–0 at halftime behind a 16-yard touchdown pass from Richard Todd to George Pugh.

The Crimson Tide continued their dominance over the Golden Bears through the second half where they outscored their opponent 45–0. In the third, Alabama scored on a three-yard James Taylor run, a 21-yard Bill Davis field goal and on a 46-yard touchdown pass from Richard Todd to Darrell Owen. In the fourth, Alabama closed with touchdowns on a Harris fumble recovery, and 18-yard run by John Boles and runs of 32 and five-yards by Willie Shelby. The 667 yards of total offense set a new school record and the 66 points were the most scored by the Crimson Tide since their 66–0 victory over Richmond in 1961.

=== Kentucky ===
Team	1	2	3	4	Total
• #4 Alabama	0	0	21	7	28
Kentucky	0	14	0	0	14

- Date: September 22
- Location: Commonwealth Stadium
  Lexington, KY
- Game start: 1:33 pm
- Elapsed time: 2:12
- Game attendance: 54,100
- Game weather: 80°, windy, partly cloudy

Scoring summary
2	14:37	Kentucky	Sonny Collins 4-yard run (Ron Steele kick)	Kentucky 7–0
2	6:56	Kentucky	Jack Alvarez 14-yard pass from Ernie Lewis (Ron Steele kick)	Kentucky 14–0
3	14:44	Alabama	Willie Shelby 100-yard kickoff return (Bill Davis kick)	Kentucky 14–7
3	7:53	Alabama	Wilbur Jackson 3-yard run (Bill Davis kick)	14–14
3	4:24	Alabama	Gary Rutledge 6-yard run (Bill Davis kick)	Alabama 21–14
4	12:13	Alabama	Willie Shelby 2-yard run (Bill Davis kick)	Alabama 28–14

After their victory over California to open the season, Alabama moved from the No. 6 to No. 4 position in the AP Poll prior to their game at Kentucky. In what was Bear Bryant's first game at Lexington since he resigned as the Wildcats head coach following their 1953 season, the Crimson Tide came from behind and won 28–14. After a scoreless first quarter, Kentucky took a 14–0 halftime lead behind second quarter touchdowns on a four-yard Sonny Collins run and a 14-yard Ernie Lewis pass to Jack Alvarez.

The Crimson Tide started their comeback on the first play of the third quarter when Willie Shelby returned the second half kickoff 100-yards for a touchdown. Touchdown runs of three-yards by Wilbur Jackson and six-yards by Gary Rutledge gave Alabama a 21–14 lead as they entered the fourth quarter. In the fourth, Shelby scored his second touchdown on a two-yard run that made the final score 28–14.

=== Vanderbilt ===
Team	1	2	3	4	Total
• #5 Alabama	17	10	10	7	44
Vanderbilt	0	0	0	0	0

- Date: September 29
- Location: Dudley Field
  Nashville, TN
- Game start: 7:34 pm
- Elapsed time: 2:11
- Game attendance: 34,500
- Game weather: Fair

Scoring summary
1	11:41	Alabama	Wayne Wheeler 14-yard pass from Gary Rutledge (Bill Davis kick)	Alabama 7–0
1	7:04	Alabama	Bill Davis 35-yard field goal	Alabama 10–0
1	0:52	Alabama	Randy Billingsley 13-yard run (Bill Davis kick)	Alabama 17–0
2	9:05	Alabama	Mike Stock 13-yard run (Bill Davis kick)	Alabama 24–0
2	0:00	Alabama	Bill Davis 22-yard field goal	Alabama 27–0
3	6:05	Alabama	Ellis Beck 4-yard run (Bill Davis kick)	Alabama 34–0
3	2:06	Alabama	Bill Davis 34-yard field goal	Alabama 37–0
4	10:03	Alabama	Mike Stock 1-yard run (Bill Davis kick)	Alabama 44–0

After their closer than expected victory over Kentucky, Alabama dropped into the No. 5 position in the AP Poll prior to their game against Vanderbilt. Against the Commodores, the Crimson Tide scored on eight of their eleven offensive possessions en route to a 44–0 shutout at Nashville. Alabama took a 17–0 lead in the first quarter behind a 14-yard Gary Rutledge touchdown pass to Wayne Wheeler, a 35-yard Bill Davis field goal and a 13-yard Randy Billingsley touchdown run. They then extended their lead to 27–0 at halftime behind a 13-yard Mike Stock touchdown run and a 22-yard Davis field goal as time expired in the second quarter.

Alabama closed the game with a four-yard Ellis Beck touchdown run and 34-yard Davis field goal in the third and a one-yard Stock run in the fourth for the 44–0 win. The game marked the first time Bryant coached against his former quarterback Steve Sloan who was the Commodores.

=== Georgia ===
Team	1	2	3	4	Total
Georgia	3	0	2	9	14
• #3 Alabama	3	10	0	15	28

- Date: October 6
- Location: Denny Stadium
  Tuscaloosa, AL
- Game start: 1:30 pm
- Elapsed time: 2:29
- Game attendance: 57,790
- Game weather: 85°, wind NE 4–10 mph, sunny

Scoring summary
1	9:54	Alabama	Bill Davis 24-yard field goal	Alabama 3–0
1	6:23	Georgia	Allan Leavitt 54-yard field goal	3–3
2	2:07	Alabama	Randy Billingsley 8-yard run (Bill Davis kick)	Alabama 10–3
2	0:57	Alabama	Bill Davis 39-yard field goal	Alabama 13–3
3	6:44	Georgia	Kirk Price blocked punt for a safety	Alabama 13–5
4	13:44	Georgia	Allan Leavitt 37-yard field goal	Alabama 13–8
4	10:02	Georgia	Jimmy Poulos 8-yard run (2-point pass failed)	Georgia 14–13
4	2:22	Alabama	Gary Rutledge 8-yard run (2-point run good)	Alabama 21–14
4	0:34	Alabama	Randy Billingsley 17-yard run (Bill Davis kick)	Alabama 28–14

After their victory over Vanderbilt, Alabama moved into the No. 3 position in the AP Poll prior to their game against Georgia. Playing in their first Denny Stadium game of the season, the Crimson Tide came-from-behind and defeated the Bulldogs 28–14 at Tuscaloosa. After each team traded first quarter field goals, Alabama took a 13–3 halftime lead behind an eight-yard Randy Billingsley touchdown run and a 39-yard Bill Davis field goal in the second quarter. In the third, Georgia cut the lead to 13–5 after Kirk Price blocked a Greg Gantt punt out of the endzone for a safety.

The Bulldogs next scored early in the fourth on a 37-yard Allan Leavitt field goal and on an eight-yard Jimmy Poulos touchdown run and took a 14–13 lead. Alabama retook the lead late in the fourth on an eight-yard Gary Rutledge touchdown run. Their defense then forced four consecutive Georgia incompletions on the possession that ensued. Billingsley then gave the Crimson Tide the 28–14 win with his 17-yard run in the final minute of the game.

=== Florida ===
Team	1	2	3	4	Total
• #3 Alabama	7	14	0	14	35
Florida	0	7	7	0	14

- Date: October 13
- Location: Florida Field
  Gainesville, FL
- Game attendance: 64,864

Scoring summary
1	1:38	Alabama	Tyrone King blocked punt recovery in endzone (Bill Davis kick)	Alabama 7–0
2	9:20	Alabama	Richard Todd 1-yard run (Bill Davis kick missed)	Alabama 13–0
2	4:13	Alabama	Calvin Culliver 11-yard run (2-point run good)	Alabama 21–0
2	1:21	Florida	Lee McGriff 16-yard pass from David Bowden (John Williams kick)	Alabama 21–7
3	8:58	Florida	Thomas Clifford 2-yard pass from David Bowden (John Williams kick)	Alabama 21–14
4	9:45	Alabama	Calvin Culliver 13-yard run (Bill Davis kick)	Alabama 28–14
4	5:42	Alabama	Wilbur Jackson 6-yard run (Bill Davis kick)	Alabama 35–14

After their victory over Georgia, Alabama retained their No. 3 position in the AP Poll prior to their game against Florida. Before what was then the largest crowd in the history of Florida Field, the Crimson Tide defeated the Gators 35–14 at Gainesville. Alabama took a 7–0 lead in the first quarter after Tyrone King recovered a blocked punt in the endzone for a touchdown. They then extended their lead to 21–0 with second quarter touchdown runs from one-yard by Richard Todd and 11-yards by Calvin Culliver.

Down by three scores, the Gators rallied with a pair of David Bowden touchdown passes that cut the Crimson Tide lead to 21–14 by the third quarter. The first was from 16-yards to Lee McGriff and the second from two-yards to Thomas Clifford. Alabama then closed the game with fourth quarter touchdown runs of 13-yards from Culliver and six-yards by Wilbur Jackson for the 35–14 win.

=== Tennessee ===
Third Saturday in October

Team	1	2	3	4	Total
#10 Tennessee	7	7	7	0	21
• #2 Alabama	14	7	0	21	42

- Date: October 20
- Location: Legion Field
  Birmingham, AL
- Game start: 12:02 pm
- Elapsed time: 2:25
- Game attendance: 72,226
- Game weather: 76°, wind W 3 mph, clear
- TV announcers (ABC): Chris Schenkel, Bud Wilkinson and Duffy Daugherty

Scoring summary
1	14:46	Alabama	Wayne Wheeler 80-yard pass from Gary Rutledge (Bill Davis kick)	Alabama 7–0
1	6:57	Alabama	Wilbur Jackson 7-yard run (Bill Davis kick)	Alabama 14–0
1	3:07	Tennessee	John Yarbrough 20-yard pass from Condredge Holloway (Ricky Townsend kick)	Alabama 14–7
2	11:33	Alabama	Darrell Owen 11-yard pass from Richard Todd (Bill Davis kick)	Alabama 21–7
2	3:41	Tennessee	Condredge Holloway 6-yard run (Ricky Townsend kick)	Alabama 21–14
3	12:40	Tennessee	Mitchell Gravitt 64-yard pass from Condredge Holloway (Ricky Townsend kick)	21–21
4	11:53	Alabama	Robin Cary 64-yard punt return (Bill Davis kick)	Alabama 28–21
4	8:34	Alabama	Wilbur Jackson 80-yard run (Bill Davis kick)	Alabama 35–21
4	6:46	Alabama	Paul Spivey 3-yard run (Bill Davis kick)	Alabama 42–21

After their victory over Florida, Alabama moved into the No. 2 position and Tennessee moved into the No. 10 position in the AP Poll prior to their game at Legion Field. Against the Volunteers, the Crimson Tide scored three touchdowns in the final quarter of the game for a 42–21, victory at Birmingham before a nationally televised audience. Alabama opened the game with an 80-yard Gary Rutledge touchdown pass to Wayne Wheeler for a 7–0 lead on their first offensive possession. After Wilbur Jackson extended their lead to 14–0 with his seven-yard run, Tennessee scored their first points on a 20-yard Condredge Holloway pass to John Yarbrough that made the score 14–7 at the end of the first. The Crimson Tide next took a 21–14 lead into halftime after Richard Todd threw an 11-yard touchdown pass to Willie Shelby and Holloway scored on a six-yard run for the Vols.

Tennessee then managed to tie the game 21–21 with the lone third quarter points on a 64-yard Holloway touchdown pass to Mitchell Gravitt. Alabama responded with three fourth quarter touchdowns en route to the 42–21 win. the first came on a 64-yard Robin Cary punt return, an 80-yard Wilbur Jackson run and a three-yard Paul Spivey run.

=== Virginia Tech ===
Team	1	2	3	4	Total
Virginia Tech	0	6	0	0	6
• #2 Alabama	14	28	28	7	77

- Date: October 27
- Location: Denny Stadium
  Tuscaloosa, AL
- Game start: 7:30 pm
- Elapsed time: 2:35
- Game attendance: 57,009
- Game weather: 65°, wind SW 4 mph

Scoring summary
1	10:26	Alabama	Wilbur Jackson 51-yard run (Bill Davis kick)	Alabama 7–0
1	5:50	Alabama	Randy Billingsley 2-yard run (Bill Davis kick)	Alabama 14–0
2	14:53	Alabama	Ralph Stokes 7-yard run (Bill Davis kick)	Alabama 21–0
2	13:56	Alabama	Conley Duncan fumble recovery (Bill Davis kick)	Alabama 28–0
2	8:37	Alabama	Darrell Owen 28-yard pass from Richard Todd (Bill Davis kick)	Alabama 35–0
2	0:58	Virginia Tech	Phil Rogers 6-yard run (2-point pass failed)	Alabama 35–6
2	0:45	Alabama	James Taylor 80-yard run (Bill Davis kick)	Alabama 42–6
3	13:53	Alabama	Randy Billingsley 7-yard run (Bill Davis kick)	Alabama 49–6
3	10:03	Alabama	Richard Todd 9-yard run (Bill Davis kick)	Alabama 56–6
3	5:49	Alabama	Jack O'Rear 14-yard run (Bill Davis kick)	Alabama 63–6
3	3:56	Alabama	Calvin Culliver 86-yard run (Bill Davis kick)	Alabama 70–6
4	8:25	Alabama	Jack O'Rear 28-yard run (Bill Davis kick)	Alabama 77–6

After their victory over Tennessee, Alabama retained their No. 2 position prior to their out of conference match-up against Virginia Tech at Denny Stadium. Against the Gobblers, the Crimson Tide set several team, conference and national offensive records with this 77–6 blowout at Tuscaloosa. Alabama opened the game with a pair of first quarter touchdown runs from 51-yards by Wilbur Jackson and two-yards from Randy Billingsley for a 14–0 lead. In the second, the Crimson Tide extended their lead to 35–0 after Ralph Stokes scored on a seven-yard run, Conley Duncan recovered a fumble in the endzone and Richard Todd threw a 28-yard touchdown pass to Darrell Owen before the Hokies scored their only points of the contest. With just under a minute to play in the first half, Phil Rogers scored Tech's only points with his six-yard touchdown run. However, Alabama responded on their next offensive play with an 80-yard James Taylor touchdown run for a 42–6 halftime lead.

The Crimson Tide continued their scoring into the second half with another four touchdowns in the third quarter. They came on runs of seven-yards by Billingsley, nine-yards by Todd, 14-yards by Jack O'Rear and 86-yards by Calvin Culliver. O'Rear then scored the final points of the game with his 28-yard touchdown run in the fourth that made the final score 77–6. Records set in the game included the most total offensive yards in SEC history with 828 and the most rushing yards in NCAA history for a single game with 743. The 828 yards of total offense for the game also eclipsed the previous record of 667 yards set against California to open the season, and the 77 points also represented the first time the Crimson Tide reached 70 points in a game since their 1945 season. Additionally, four Alabama backs rushed for over 100 yards with 142 yards from Taylor, 138 from Jackson, 127 yards from Culliver and 102 yards from Todd.

=== Mississippi State ===
Team	1	2	3	4	Total
• #2 Alabama	7	6	8	14	35
Mississippi State	0	0	0	0	0

- Date: November 3
- Location: Mississippi Veterans Memorial Stadium
  Jackson, MS
- Game start: 8:15 pm
- Elapsed time: 2:19
- Game attendance: 46,000
- Game weather: Clear and warm

Scoring summary
1	14:28	Alabama	Randy Billingsley 38-yard run (Bill Davis kick)	Alabama 7–0
2	13:48	Alabama	Bill Davis 33-yard field goal	Alabama 10–0
2	4:09	Alabama	Bill Davis 27-yard field goal	Alabama 13–0
3	7:20	Alabama	Willie Shelby 29-yard run (2-point pass good)	Alabama 21–0
4	11:52	Alabama	Wilbur Jackson 6-yard run (2-point pass failed)	Alabama 27–0
4	8:32	Alabama	Ralph Stokes 1-yard run (2-point pass good)	Alabama 35–0

As they entered their game against Mississippi State, Alabama retained their No. 2 position in the AP Poll. Favored by 28 points as they entered the game, the Crimson Tide shutout the Bulldogs 35–0 at Jackson. On the second offensive play of the game, Alabama took a 7–0 lead behind a 38-yard Randy Billingsley touchdown run. State then held the Crimson Tide to only a pair of Bill Davis field goals from 33 and 27-yards for a 13–0 Alabama lead at halftime.

The Crimson Tide then closed the game with three second half touchdowns for the 35–0 win. Willie Shelby scored on a 29-yard run in the third and Wilbur Jackson and Ralph Stokes scored on runs of six and one-yard in the fourth. In the game, Sam Nichols missed a pair of field goals for the Bulldogs from 30 and 32-yards that would have prevented the shutout.

=== Miami (FL) ===
Team	1	2	3	4	Total
Miami	0	0	6	7	13
• #2 Alabama	15	7	7	14	43

- Date: November 17
- Location: Denny Stadium
  Tuscaloosa, AL
- Game attendance: 58,404

Scoring summary
1	Alabama	Greg Montgomery blocked punt for a safety	Alabama 2–0
1	Alabama	Gary Rutledge 2-yard run (2-point run failed)	Alabama 8–0
1	Alabama	John Sharpless 69-yard pass from Gary Rutledge (Bill Davis kick)	Alabama 15–0
2	Alabama	Willie Shelby 52-yard punt return (Bill Davis kick)	Alabama 22–0
3	Miami	Woody Thompson 3-yard run (2-point run failed)	Alabama 22–6
3	Alabama	Darrell Owen 9-yard pass from Gary Rutledge (Bill Davis kick)	Alabama 29–6
4	Alabama	James Taylor 5-yard run (Bill Davis kick)	Alabama 36–6
4	Alabama	John Boles 62-yard punt return (Bill Davis kick)	Alabama 43–6
4	Miami	Steve Marcantonio 78-yard pass from Coy Hall (Brian Selmer kick)	Alabama 43–13

As they entered their game against Miami, Alabama retained their No. 2 position in the AP Poll for a fourth consecutive week. On homecoming in Tuscaloosa, Alabama defeated Hurricanes 43–13 and after the victory accepted an invitation to compete in the Sugar Bowl. Alabama scored their first points early in the game when Greg Montgomery blocked a Miami punt out of the endzone for a safety. They then extended their lead to 15–0 by the end of the first behind a two-yard Gary Rutledge run and a 69-yard Rutledge pass to John Sharpless. Willie Shelby then made the halftime score 22–0 with his 52-yard punt return.

Miami scored their first points early in the third on a three-yard Woody Thompson touchdown run. However, Alabama responded later in the quarter with a nine-yard Rutledge touchdown pass to Darrell Owen and made the score 29–6. In the final quarter, the Crimson Tide closed with a five-yard James Taylor touchdown run and a 62-yard John Boles punt return. The Hurricanes then scored the final points of the game on a 78-yard Coy Hall touchdown pass to Steve Marcantonio that made the final score 43–13.

=== LSU ===
Team	1	2	3	4	Total
• #2 Alabama	0	14	7	0	21
#7 LSU	0	0	0	7	7

- Date: November 22
- Location: Tiger Stadium
  Baton Rouge, LA
- Game start: 5:40 pm
- Elapsed time: 2:25
- Game attendance: 67,730
- Television network: ABC

Scoring summary
2	13:56	Alabama	Gary Rutledge 19-yard run (Bill Davis kick miss)	Alabama 6–0
2	6:52	Alabama	George Pugh 49-yard pass from Gary Rutledge (2-point run good)	Alabama 14–0
3	9:06	Alabama	Wayne Wheeler 77-yard pass from Gary Rutledge (Bill Davis kick)	Alabama 21–0
4	13:15	LSU	Brad Davis 40-yard run (Rusty Jackson kick)	Alabama 21–7

After their victory over Miami, Alabama retained their No. 2 position and LSU was in the No. 7 position in the AP Poll prior to their match-up at Baton Rouge on Thanksgiving Day. Playing in a regionally televised game on ABC, Alabama defeated the previously undefeated Tigers 21–7 and secured both the 500th win in the history of Crimson Tide football and captured the 1973 conference championship. After a scoreless first quarter, Alabama took a 14–0 halftime lead with a pair of touchdowns in the second quarter. The first came on a 19-yard Gary Rutledge run and the second on a 49-yard Rutledge pass to George Pugh.

In the third, the Crimson Tide extended their lead to 21–0 after Rutledge threw a 77-yard touchdown pass to Wayne Wheeler. LSU answered early in the fourth with their only points on a 40-yard Brad Davis run that made the final score 21–7.

=== Auburn ===
Iron Bowl

Team	1	2	3	4	Total
• #1 Alabama	14	0	7	14	35
Auburn	0	0	0	0	0

- Date: December 1
- Location: Legion Field
  Birmingham, AL
- Game start: 5:13 pm
- Elapsed time: 2:13
- Game attendance: 69,418
- Television network: ABC

Scoring summary
1	7:50	Alabama	Randy Billingsley 7-yard run (Bill Davis kick)	Alabama 7–0
1	1:31	Alabama	Gary Rutledge 1-yard run (Bill Davis kick)	Alabama 14–0
3	9:22	Alabama	Gary Rutledge 3-yard run (Bill Davis kick)	Alabama 21–0
4	12:48	Alabama	Wilbur Jackson 14-yard run (Bill Davis kick)	Alabama 28–0
4	1:49	Alabama	James Taylor 8-yard run (Bill Davis kick)	Alabama 35–0

As they entered their annual rivalry game against Auburn, Alabama moved into the No. 1 position in the AP Poll prior to their match-up in the Iron Bowl. Seeking to avenge their loss from the previous season to the Tigers the Crimson Tide were dominant in this 35–0 shutout at Legion Field. Alabama took a 14–0 lead in the first quarter behind touchdown runs of seven-yards by Randy Billingsley and of one-yard by Gary Rutledge.

After a scoreless second, Rutledge scored his second rushing touchdown early in the third on a three-yard run for a 21–0 lead. The Crimson Tide then closed the game with touchdown runs of 14-yards by Wilbur Jackson and eight-yards by James Taylor for the 35–0 win.

=== Notre Dame ===
Sugar Bowl

Team	1	2	3	4	Total
• #3 Notre Dame	6	8	7	3	24
#1 Alabama	0	10	7	6	23

- Date: December 31
- Location: Tulane Stadium
  New Orleans, LA
- Game attendance: 85,161
- Referee: Gene Calhoun (Big Ten Conference)
- TV announcers (ABC): Chris Schenkel, Bud Wilkinson and Howard Cosell

Scoring summary
1	3:19	Notre Dame	Wayne Bullock 6-yard run (Bob Thomas kick failed)	Notre Dame 6–0
2	7:30	Alabama	Randy Billingsley 6-yard run (Bill Davis kick)	Alabama 7–6
2	7:17	Notre Dame	Al Hunter 93-yard kickoff return (2-point pass good)	Notre Dame 14–7
2	0:39	Alabama	Bill Davis 33-yard field goal	Notre Dame 14–10
3	11:02	Alabama	Wilbur Jackson 5-yard-yard run (Bill Davis kick)	Alabama 17–14
3	0:07	Notre Dame	Eric Penick 12-yard run (Bob Thomas kick)	Notre Dame 21–17
4	9:33	Alabama	Richard Todd 25-yard pass from Mike Stock (Bill Davis kick failed)	Alabama 23–21
4	4:26	Notre Dame	Bob Thomas 19-yard field goal	Notre Dame 24–23

At the conclusion of the regular season, Alabama was selected as national champions in the UPI Coaches' Poll. However, the Crimson Tide would not win the AP championship as they lost 24–23 against Notre Dame in what was a classic Sugar Bowl.

Notre Dame checked into the locker room at halftime up 14–10, the big play coming on a 93-yard kickoff return for a touchdown by Al Hunter. Each team scored a touchdown in the third quarter, that left the Irish up 21–17 going into the fourth. Alabama took a 23–21 lead on a fleaflicker touchdown pass from running back Mike Strock back to quarterback Richard Todd. However, Bill Davis missed the extra point and Alabama was up by only two. Notre Dame drove the ball downfield and kicked a 19-yard field goal to go up 24–23 with 4:26 to go. Bama could not answer, but the punt left Notre Dame backed up to their own goal. With time ticking away and Notre Dame facing a third and eight, Alabama had a chance to get the ball back in excellent field position, but Irish QB Tom Clements threw a 35-yard pass to tight end Robin Webber and Notre Dame held on to win the game and the AP national championship.

== Roster ==
1973 Alabama Crimson Tide football team roster
Players
Coaches
Offense

Pos.	#	Name	Class
OT		Marvin Barron	Sr
G		Bo Batey	So
FB	35	Ellis Beck	Sr
RB	22	Randy Billingsley	Jr
RB	38	Duffy Boles	So
RB		Joey Bolton	So
G	65	Buddy Brown	Sr
TE		Jerry Brown	So
OT	70	Bob Bryan	Jr
TE	94	Sylvester Croom	Jr
RB	46	Steve Dean	Sr
TE	86	Warren Dyar	Sr
C	69	Mike Eckenrod	Sr
QB		Robert Fraley	Jr
G		Gary Hanrahan	So
RB	84	Joe Dale Harris	So
FB		Bob Haught	So
OT		John Hollis	So
FB	31	Bob Holmes	So
OT	60	Morris Hunt	Sr
WR	80	Wilbur Jackson	Sr
HB		John LaBue	So
OT		Buford Lambert	So
C	58	Rand Lambert	Jr
OT		Barry McGee	So
C		David McIntyre	So
TE		Rick McLain	So
G		Ray Maxwell	So
TE	87	Randy Moore	Sr
RB	20	Phil Murphy	Jr
TE	28	Tom Nelson	So
OT		Butch Norman	Sr
WR	6	Pete Pappas	Jr
G	71	Steve Patterson	Jr
G		Buddy Pope	So
TE		George Pugh	So
WR	82	Darrell Owen	Sr
QB	15	Danny Ridgeway	So
OT	61	John Rogers	Jr
OT	68	Rick Rogers	Sr
QB	11	Gary Rutledge	Jr
SE		Russ Schamun	So
SE	16	Johnny Sharpless	Sr
RB		Willie Shelby	So
C		Sid Smith	So
RB	24	Paul Spivey	Sr
OT	78	Steve Sprayberry	Sr
RB		Mike Stock	So
RB	42	Ralph Stokes	Jr
WR		Sam Tate	Jr
RB	27	James Taylor	So
QB		Richard Todd	So
G		Jerry Washco	So
FB		Rick Watson	So
G		Joe Weaver	So
WR		Wayne Wheeler	Sr
G	72	Richard Whitley	Jr
OT	67	Rudy Wooten	So

Defense

Pos.	#	Name	Class
SS		Tom Baggett	So
S		Ray Bolden	So
LB		Tom Bouck	So
DB	48	Robin Cary	Sr
DE		Mike Christian	So
DE		Leroy Cook	So
DE	83	John Croyle	Sr
DB	19	Ricky Davis	Jr
LB	37	Jimmy Dawson	Jr
LB	57	Mike DuBose	Jr
LB		Conley Duncan	So
DE	91	Don Groves	Jr
DT	62	Randy Hall	Jr
LB	50	Wayne Hall	Sr
DT		Bill Harrison	So
DB		Tyrone King	So
DT	95	Skip Kubelius	Sr
DT	66	Steve Kulback	So
LB		Woodrow Lowe	So
SS		David McMakin	Sr
DE	51	Noah Miller	Jr
LB		Greg Montgomery	So
DE		John Niehaus	So
DE		Steve Patton	Fr
DB		Lefty Perry	So
S		Alan Pizzitola	So
SS		Mark Prudhomme	So
DT	74	Max Raines	Sr
DB		Wayne Rhodes	So
DB	23	Mike Riley	Jr
LB	55	Ronnie Robertson	Jr
LB		Jeff Rouzie	Sr
DT		Larry Ruffin	So
LB		John Sheehan	So
LB	36	Chuck Strickland	Sr
DE		Dick Turpin	So
DB	34	Mike Washington	Jr
DE	93	David Watkins	Sr
LB	49	Gary Yelvington	Jr

Special teams

Pos.	#	Name	Class
PK		Bucky Berrey	So
PK	1	Bill Davis	Sr
PK		Mike Davis	So
PK	8	Greg Gantt	Sr

Head coach

- Bear Bryant (16th year, Alabama)

Coordinators/assistant coaches

- Ken Donahue (10th year, Tennessee)
- Pat Dye (9th year, Georgia)
- Danny Ford (2nd year, Alabama)
- Jim Goostree (17th year, Tennessee)
- Clem Gryska (14th year, Alabama)
- Curley Hallman (1st year, Texas A&M)
- Dude Hennessey (14th year, Kentucky)
- Bobby Marks (2nd year, Texas A&M)
- Ken Martin (3rd year, Alabama)
- John Mitchell (1st year, Alabama)
- Bud Moore (2nd year, Alabama)
- Mal Moore (10th year, Alabama)
- Bill Oliver (3rd year, Alabama)
- Dee Powell (10th year, Texas A&M)
- Jack Rutledge (8th year, Alabama)
- Jimmy Sharpe (11th year, Alabama)

Legend

- (C) Team captain
- (S) Suspended
- (I) Ineligible
- Injured
- Redshirt

Roster
Last update: July 5, 2014

== NFL draft ==
Several players that were varsity lettermen from the 1973 squad were selected in the NFL draft in the 1974, 1975 and 1976. These players included:

Year	Round	Overall	Player name	Position	NFL team
1974 NFL draft	1	9	Wilbur Jackson	Running back	San Francisco 49ers
1974 NFL draft	3	54	Wayne Wheeler	Wide receiver	Chicago Bears
1974 NFL draft	6	138	Mike Raines	Defensive tackle	San Francisco 49ers
1974 NFL draft	8	187	Greg Gantt	Punter	New York Jets
1974 NFL draft	16	392	Buddy Brown	Guard	New York Giants
1975 NFL draft	3	53	Mike Washington	Defensive back	Baltimore Colts
1975 NFL draft	8	195	Ricky Davis	Defensive back	Cincinnati Bengals
1976 NFL draft	1	6	Richard Todd	Quarterback	New York Jets
1976 NFL draft	4	108	Wayne Rhodes	Defensive back	Chicago Bears
1976 NFL draft	5	131	Woodrow Lowe	Linebacker	San Diego Chargers
1976 NFL draft	5	138	Willie Shelby	Running back	Cincinnati Bengals
1976 NFL draft	10	290	Leroy Cook	Defensive end	Dallas Cowboys
1976 NFL draft	12	341	Joe Dale Harris	Wide receiver	Cincinnati Bengals
