= 1973 Auburn Tigers football team =

American college football season

1973 Auburn Tigers football

Sun Bowl, L 17–34 vs. Missouri
- Conference: Southeastern Conference
- Record: 6–6 (2–5 SEC)
- Head coach: Ralph Jordan (23rd season)
- Home stadium: Jordan–Hare Stadium; Legion Field

1973 Southeastern Conference football standings
	Conf.					Overall
Team	W		L		T	W		L		T
No. 4 Alabama $	8	–	0	–	0	11	–	1	–	0
No. 13 LSU	5	–	1	–	0	9	–	3	–	0
Ole Miss	4	–	3	–	0	6	–	5	–	0
No. 19 Tennessee	3	–	3	–	0	8	–	4	–	0
Georgia	3	–	4	–	0	7	–	4	–	1
Florida	3	–	4	–	0	7	–	5	–	0
Kentucky	3	–	4	–	0	5	–	6	–	0
Auburn	2	–	5	–	0	6	–	6	–	0
Mississippi State	2	–	5	–	0	4	–	5	–	2
Vanderbilt	1	–	5	–	0	5	–	6	–	0
$ – Conference champion; Rankings from AP Poll

The 1973 Auburn Tigers football team achieved an overall record of 6–6 and 2–5 in the SEC under head coach Ralph "Shug" Jordan. They were invited to the 1973 Sun Bowl where they lost to Missouri 17–34.

This was the first season in which Auburn played 11 regular season games, making it the last SEC school to add an 11th game. Most conference members started scheduling 11 games in 1970, the first year it was permitted by the NCAA.

On September 13, 1973, the Thursday before Auburn's first home game of the season, Auburn's home stadium, known up to that time as Cliff Hare Stadium, was renamed in honor of the Ralph Jordan, marking the first time a stadium has been renamed for an active coach. Harry Philpott, President of Auburn University at that time, said "Renaming the stadium is really in keeping with the outstanding job Coach Jordan has done during his outstanding career", adding that, "It also brings together two great eras of athletic achievement."

Four players were named to the All-SEC first team for 1973: Benny Sivley (DT), Steve Taylor (C), Mike Fuller (DB), and David Langner (DB).

On December 1, Alabama avenged their stunning loss the previous year in the Iron Bowl game that became known as "Punt Bama Punt" by shutting out Auburn 35–0.

== Schedule ==
Date	Opponent	Rank	Site	Result	Attendance	Source
September 15	Oregon State*	No. 12	Legion Field; Birmingham, AL	W 18–9	45,000	
September 22	Chattanooga*		Jordan–Hare Stadium; Auburn, AL	W 31–0	46,500	
September 29	at No. 9 Tennessee	No. 11	Neyland Stadium; Knoxville, TN (rivalry)	L 0–21	71,656	
October 6	Ole Miss		Jordan–Hare Stadium; Auburn, AL (rivalry)	W 14–7	56,500	
October 13	LSU		Jordan–Hare Stadium; Auburn, AL (rivalry)	L 6–20	64,331	
October 20	at Georgia Tech*		Grant Field; Atlanta, GA (rivalry)	W 24–10	59,123	
October 27	No. 12 Houston*^{†}		Jordan–Hare Stadium; Auburn, AL	W 7–0	58,426	
November 3	Florida	No. 19	Jordan–Hare Stadium; Auburn, AL (rivalry)	L 8–12	63,429	
November 10	Mississippi State		Jordan–Hare Stadium; Auburn, AL	W 31–17	48,427	
November 17	at No. 20 Georgia		Sanford Stadium; Athens, GA (rivalry)	L 14–28	59,700	
December 1	vs. No. 1 Alabama		Legion Field; Birmingham, AL (Iron Bowl)	L 0–35	69,418	
December 29	vs. Missouri*		Sun Bowl; El Paso, TX (Sun Bowl)	L 17–34	30,127	
*Non-conference game; ^{†}Homecoming; Rankings from AP Poll released prior to the game

== Roster ==
1973 Auburn Tigers football team roster
Players
Coaches
Offense

Pos.	#	Name	Class
WR		Tom Gossom	Jr
C	55	Lee Gross	Jr
RB		Mitzi Jackson
	29	Chris Linderman	Jr
TE	80	Dan Nugent	Jr
C		Steve Taylor	Sr
QB		Randy Walls

Defense

Pos.	#	Name	Class
LB		Ken Bernich	Jr
DB	42	Mike Fuller	Jr
DB		Gary Grantham	Jr
LB		Carl Hubbard
DB		David Langner	Sr
LB		Bill Newton

Special teams

Pos.	#	Name	Class

Head coach

- Shug Jordan

Coordinators/assistant coaches

Legend

- (C) Team captain
- (S) Suspended
- (I) Ineligible
- Injured
- Redshirt
