= List of Texas Longhorns starting quarterbacks =

This is a list of the starting quarterbacks for the Texas Longhorns football teams since 1893. They are listed in order of the first game each player started for the Longhorns that season. A player is credited with a win if he started the game and the team won that game, no matter if the player was injured or permanently removed after the first play.

== Starting Quarterbacks by Year ==
=== Before 1944 ===
Season	Quarterback	# of Starts	Record as Starter	Ref
1893	Billy McLean	3	3–0	
1893	Dick Lee	1	1–0	
1894	Thomas Sewell			
1895	James Jones			
1896	James Jones			
1897	A. G. Blacklock			
1898	Sam Hogsett			
1899	Semp Russ			
1900	Semp Russ			
1901	Rembert Watson			
1901	Randon Porter			
1902	Rembert Watson			
1902	Randon Porter			
1903	S. S. Searcy			
1904	Neil Masterson			
1905	William Blocker			
1905	William Francis			
1905	E. L. Wilkerson			
1906	Ben Dyer			
1907	Ben Dyer			
1907	Arnold L. Kirkpatrick			
1908	Ben Dyer			
1909	Ben Dyer			
1909	Arnold L. Kirkpatrick			
1910	Arnold L. Kirkpatrick			
1911	Arnold L. Kirkpatrick			
1911	Nelson Puett			
1912	Nelson Puett			
1913	Leonard Barrell			
1914	Coke Wimmer			
1914	Leonard Barrell			
1915	Bob Simmons			
1916	Billy Trabue			
1917	Billy Trabue			
1917	Brownlee Ferguson			
1917	Pete Smith			
1918	Brownlee Ferguson			
1919	Wilson Brennan			
1920	Kyle Elam			
1921	Kyle Elam			
1922	Franklin Stacy			
1923	Ivan Robertson			
1924	Hubert Foster			
1924	Stewart Wright			
1925	Stewart Wright			
1925	Joe King			
1926	Joe King			
1926	Mack Saxon			
1927	Joe King			
1928	Ed Beuler			
1928	Nono Reese			
1929	Nono Reese			
1930	Bull Elkins			
1931	Bull Elkins			
1931	Charles Bankhead			
1932	Charles Bankhead			
1932	Hank Clewis			
1933	Buster Baebel			
1933	Charles Johnston			
1934	Buster Baebel			
1935	Johnny Morrow			
1935	Jimmy Hadlock			
1936	Henry Mittermayer			
1937	William Forney			
1938	William Forney			
1939	Lewis Gray			
1940	Jimmie Grubbs			
1940	Vernon Martin			
1941	Vernon Martin			
1942	Joe Magliolo			
1942	Spot Collins			
1943	Joe Magliolo			

=== 1944 to present ===
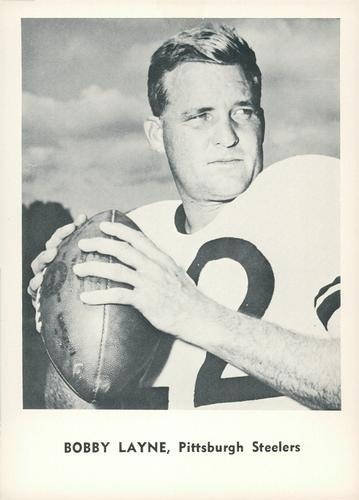
Bobby Layne (1944-1947)

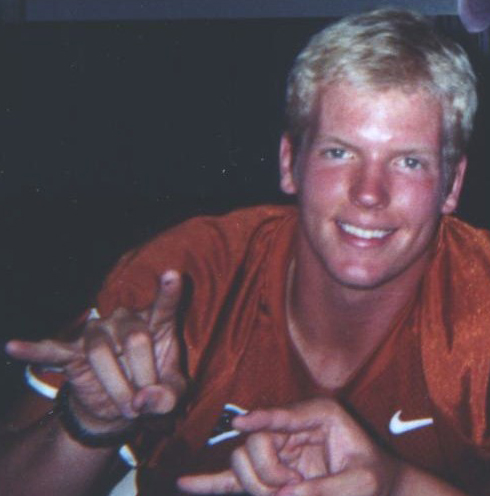
Chris Simms (1999-2002)

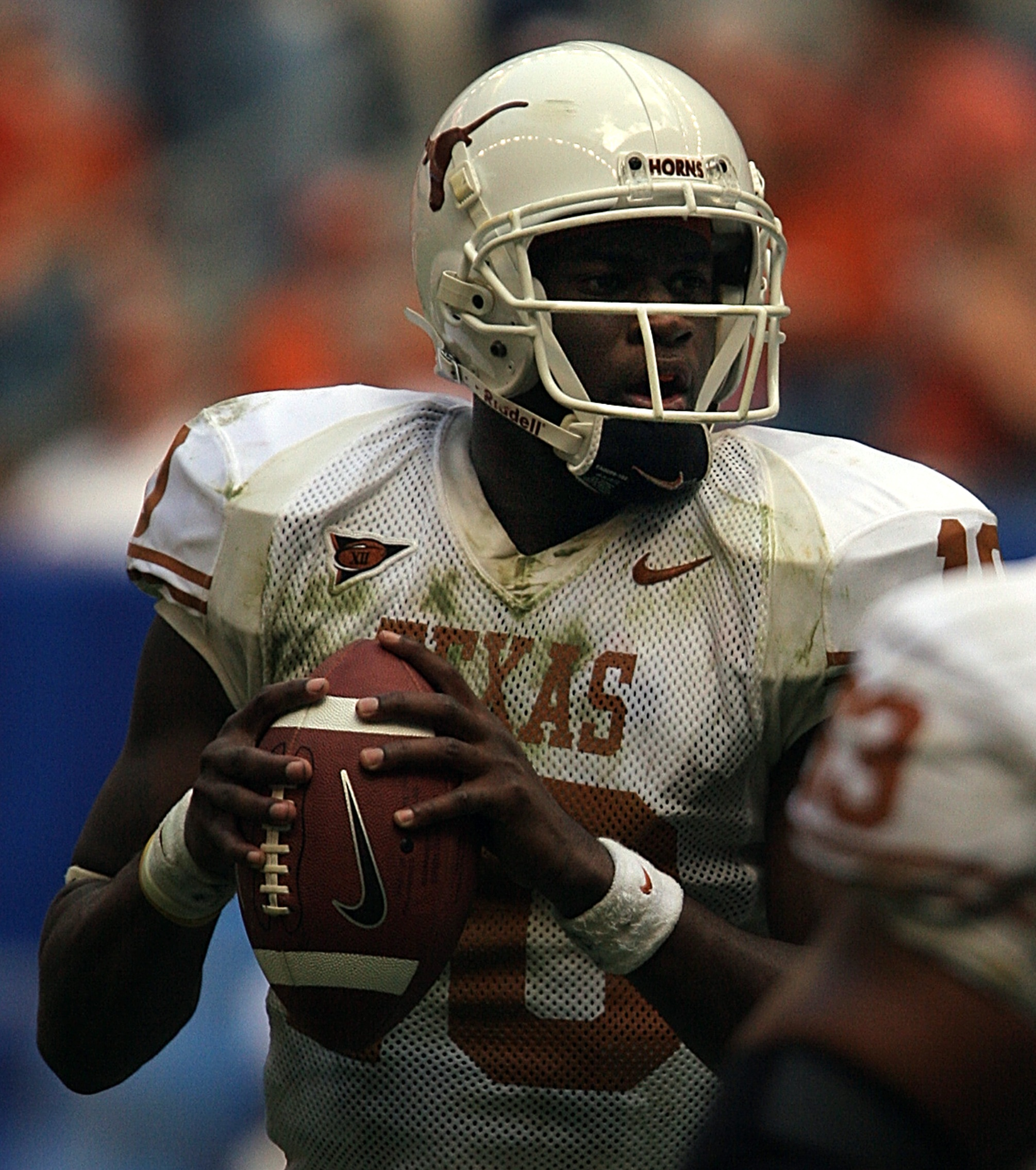
Vince Young (2003-2005)

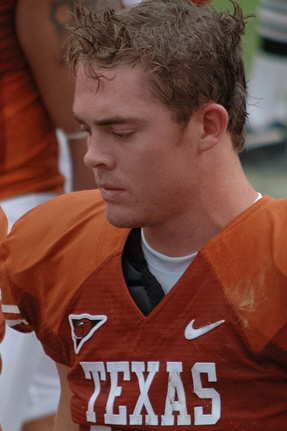
Colt McCoy (2006-2009)

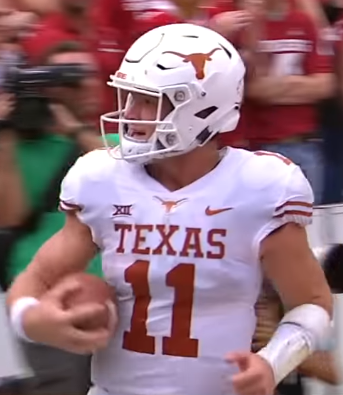
Sam Ehlinger (2017-2020)

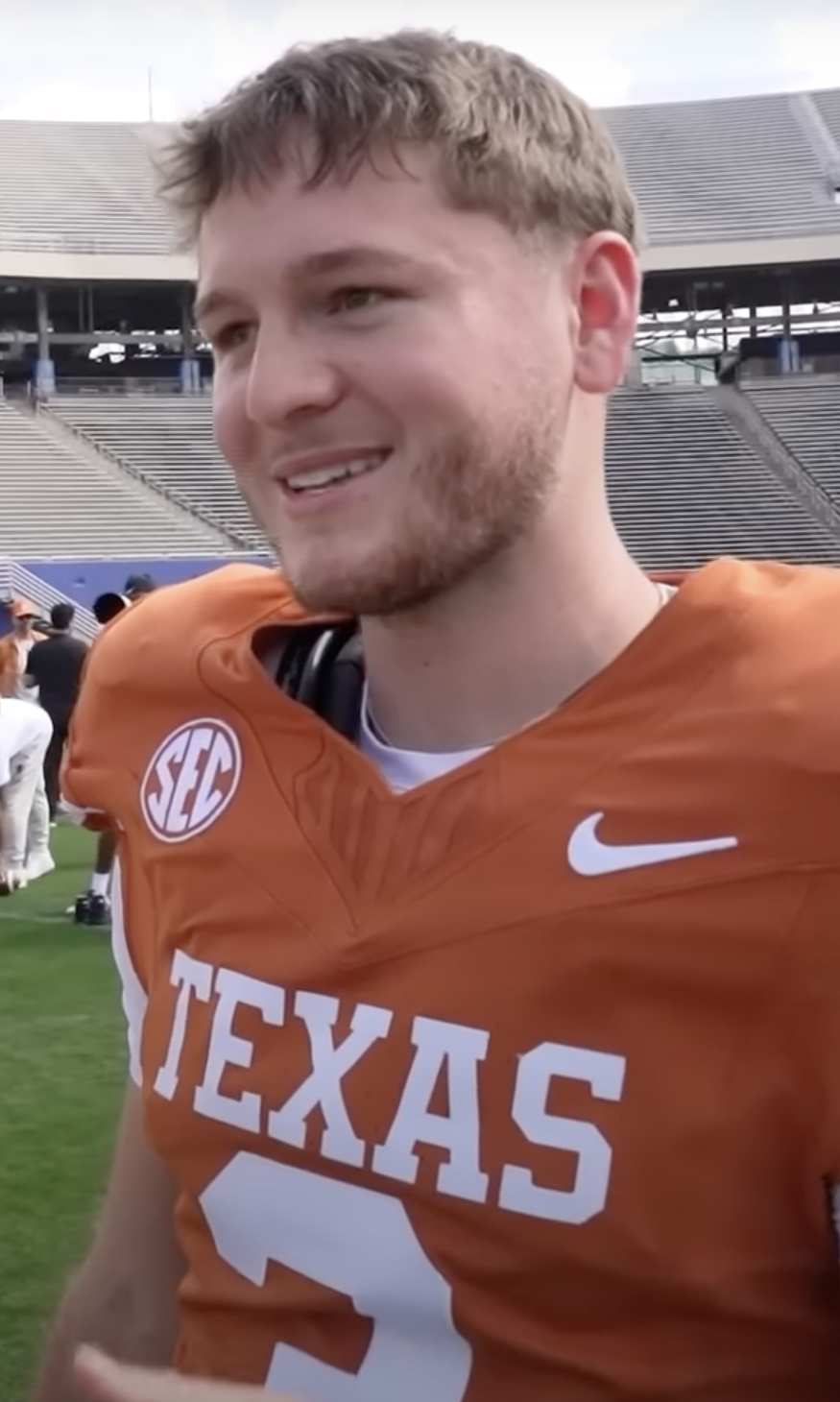
Quinn Ewers (2022-2024)

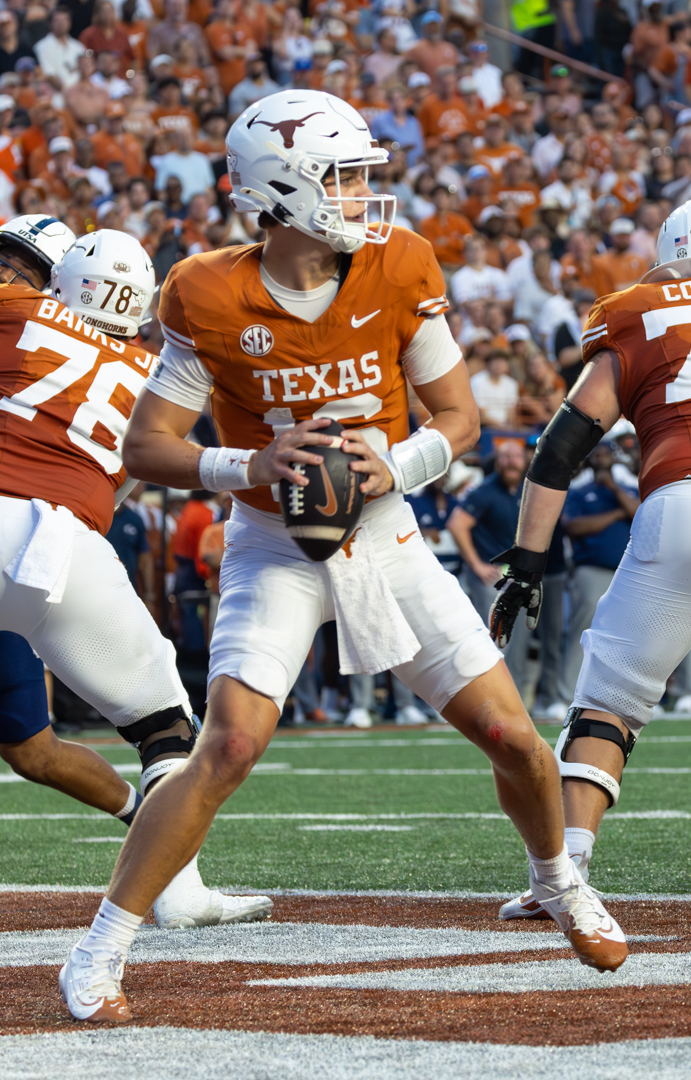
Arch Manning (2025-present)

Season	Quarterback	# of Starts	Record as Starter	Ref
1944	Bobby Layne	8	5–3	
1944	Zeke Martin	1	0–1	
1945	Bobby Layne	5	5–0	
1945	Jack Halfpenny	6	5–1	
1946	Bobby Layne	10	8–2	
1947	Bobby Layne	11	10–1	
1948	Paul Campbell	11	7–3–1	
1949	Paul Campbell	10	6–4	
1950	Ben Tompkins	11	9–2	
1951	James T Jones	6	5–1	
1951	Dan Page	4	2–2	
1952	James T Jones	11	9–2	
1953	Bunny Andrews	4	2–2	
1953	Charles Brewer	6	5–1	
1954	Charles Brewer	10	4–5–1	
1955	Walter Fondren	2	1–1	
1955	Joe Clements	8	4–4	
1956	Joe Clements	10	1–9	
1957	Walter Fondren	11	6–4–1	
1958	Bobby Lackey	10	7–3	
1959	Bobby Lackey	11	9–2	
1960	Mike Cotten	11	7–3–1	
1961	Mike Cotten	11	10–1	
1962	Johnny Genung	7	5–1–1	
1962	Duke Carlisle	1	1–0	
1962	Tommy Wade	3	3–0	
1963	Duke Carlisle	11	11–0	
1964	Marvin Kristynik	10	9–1	
1964	Jim Hudson	1	1–0	
1965	Marvin Kristynik	10	6–4	
1966	Bill Bradley	10	7–3	
1966	Andy White	1	0–1	
1967	Bill Bradley	10	6–4	
1968	Bill Bradley	2	0–1–1	
1968	James Street	9	9–0	
1969	James Street	11	11–0	
1970	Eddie Phillips	11	10–1	
1971	Eddie Phillips	5	4–1	
1971	Donnie Wigginton	6	4–2	
1972	Alan Lowry	11	10–1	
1973	Marty Akins	11	8–3	
1974	Marty Akins	11	7–4	
1974	Mike Presley	1	1–0	
1975	Marty Akins	12	10–2	
1976	Mike Cordaro	6	3–2–1	
1976	Ted Constanzo	1	0–1	
1976	Mark McBath	4	2–2	
1977	Mark McBath	4	4–0	
1977	Randy McEachern	6	5–1	
1977	Sam Ansley	2	2–0	
1978	Mark McBath	2	2–0	
1978	Randy McEachern	9	6–3	
1978	Donnie Little	1	1–0	
1979	Donnie Little	9	8–1	
1979	Rick McIvor	3	1–2	
1980	Donnie Little	10	6–4	
1980	Rick McIvor	2	1–1	
1981	Rick McIvor	8	6–1–1	
1981	Robert Brewer	4	4–0	
1982	Robert Brewer	11	9–2	
1982	Todd Dodge	1	0–1	
1983	Rick McIvor	1	0–1	
1983	Todd Dodge	2	2–0	
1983	Rob Moerschell	9	9–0	
1984	Todd Dodge	12	7–4–1	
1985	Bret Stafford	12	8–4	
1986	Bret Stafford	11	5–6	
1987	Bret Stafford	11	6–5	
1987	Shannon Kelley	1	1–0	
1988	Shannon Kelley	6	3–3	
1988	Mark Murdock	5	1–4	
1989	Mark Murdock	3	1–2	
1989	Peter Gardere	7	4–3	
1989	Donovan Forbes	1	0–1	
1990	Peter Gardere	12	10–2	
1991	Peter Gardere	11	5–6	
1992	Peter Gardere	11	6–5	
1993	Shea Morenz	11	5–5–1	
1994	Shea Morenz	8	4–4	
1994	James Brown	4	4–0	
1995	James Brown	12	9–2–1	
1995	Richard Walton	1	1–0	
1996	James Brown	13	8–5	
1997	James Brown	10	4–6	
1997	Richard Walton	1	0–1	
1998	Richard Walton	2	1–1	
1998	Major Applewhite	10	8–2	
1999	Major Applewhite	13	9–4	
1999	Chris Simms	1	0–1	
2000	Major Applewhite	6	4–2	
2000	Chris Simms	6	5–1	
2001	Major Applewhite	1	1–0	
2001	Chris Simms	12	10–2	
2002	Chris Simms	13	11–2	
2003	Chance Mock	6	4–2	
2003	Vince Young	7	6–1	
2004	Vince Young	12	11–1	
2005	Vince Young	13	13–0	
2006	Colt McCoy	13	10–3	
2007	Colt McCoy	13	10–3	
2008	Colt McCoy	13	12–1	
2009	Colt McCoy	14	13–1	
2010	Garrett Gilbert	12	5–7	
2011	Garrett Gilbert	2	2–0	
2011	Case McCoy	5	3–2	
2011	David Ash	6	3–3	
2012	Case McCoy	1	0–1	
2012	David Ash	12	9–3	
2013	Case McCoy	10	6–4	
2013	David Ash	3	2–1	
2014	David Ash	1	1–0	
2014	Tyrone Swoopes	12	5–7	
2015	Tyrone Swoopes	2	1–1	
2015	Jerrod Heard	10	4–6	
2016	Shane Buechele	12	5–7	
2017	Shane Buechele	7	5–2	
2017	Sam Ehlinger	6	2–4	
2018	Sam Ehlinger	14	10–4	
2019	Sam Ehlinger	13	8–5	
2020	Sam Ehlinger	10	7–3	
2021	Hudson Card	2	1–1	
2021	Casey Thompson	10	4–6	
2022	Quinn Ewers	10	6–4	
2022	Hudson Card	3	2–1	
2023	Quinn Ewers	12	10–2	
2023	Maalik Murphy	2	2–0	
2024	Quinn Ewers	14	11–3	
2024	Arch Manning	2	2–0	
2025	Arch Manning	13	10–3	
2026	Arch Manning	10	8-2	

== Career Record ==
Quarterback	Games Started	Wins	Losses	Ties	Win %	Seasons as Starter
Colt McCoy	53	45	8	0	.849	2006, 2007, 2008, 2009
Vince Young	32	30	2	0	.938	2003, 2004, 2005
Bobby Layne	34	28	6	0	.824	1944, 1945, 1946, 1947
Quinn Ewers	35	27	9	0	.750	2022, 2023, 2024
Sam Ehlinger	43	27	16	0	.628	2017, 2018, 2019, 2020
Chris Simms	32	26	6	0	.813	1999, 2000, 2001, 2002
Marty Akins	34	25	9	0	.735	1973, 1974, 1975
James Brown	39	25	13	1	.654	1994, 1995, 1996, 1997
Peter Gardere	41	25	16	0	.610	1989, 1990, 1991, 1992
Major Applewhite	30	22	8	0	.733	1998, 1999, 2000, 2001
James Street	20	20	0	0	1.000	1968, 1969
Bret Stafford	34	19	15	0	.559	1985, 1986, 1987
Mike Cotten	22	17	4	1	.795	1960, 1961
Arch Manning	19	16	3	0	.842	2024, 2025, 2026
Bobby Lackey	21	16	5	0	.762	1958, 1959
Marvin Kristynik	20	15	5	0	.750	1964, 1965
Donnie Little	20	15	5	0	.750	1978, 1979, 1980
David Ash	22	15	7	0	.682	2011, 2012, 2013, 2014
Eddie Phillips	16	14	2	0	.875	1970, 1971
James T Jones	17	14	3	0	.824	1951, 1952
Robert Brewer	15	13	2	0	.867	1981, 1982
Paul Campbell	21	13	7	1	.643	1948, 1949
Bill Bradley	22	13	8	1	.614	1966, 1967, 1968
Duke Carlisle	12	12	0	0	1.000	1962, 1963
Randy McEachern	15	11	4	0	.733	1977, 1978
Alan Lowry	11	10	1	0	.909	1972
Shane Buechele	19	10	9	0	.526	2016, 2017
Rob Moerschell	9	9	0	0	1.000	1983
Ben Tompkins	11	9	2	0	.818	1950
Todd Dodge	15	9	5	1	.633	1982, 1983, 1984
Charles Brewer	16	9	6	1	.594	1953, 1954
Case McCoy	16	9	7	0	.563	2011, 2012, 2013
Shea Morenz	19	9	9	1	.500	1993, 1994
Mark McBath	10	8	2	0	.800	1976, 1977, 1978
Rick McIvor	14	8	5	1	.607	1979, 1980, 1981, 1983
Walter Fondren	13	7	5	1	.577	1955, 1957
Garrett Gilbert	14	7	7	0	.500	2010, 2011
Tyrone Swoopes	14	6	8	0	.429	2014, 2015
Jack Halfpenny	6	5	1	0	.833	1945
Johnny Genung	7	5	1	1	.786	1962
Joe Clements	18	5	13	0	.278	1955, 1956
Donnie Wigginton	6	4	2	0	.667	1971
Chance Mock	6	4	2	0	.667	2003
Shannon Kelley	7	4	3	0	.571	1987, 1988
Jerrod Heard	10	4	6	0	.400	2015
Casey Thompson	10	4	6	0	.400	2021
Tommy Wade	3	3	0	0	1.000	1962
Hudson Card	5	3	2	0	.600	2021, 2022
Mike Cordaro	6	3	2	1	.583	1976
Sam Ansley	2	2	0	0	1.000	1977
Maalik Murphy	2	2	0	0	1.000	2023
Dan Page	4	2	2	0	.500	1951
Bunny Andrews	4	2	2	0	.500	1953
Richard Walton	4	2	2	0	.500	1995, 1997, 1998
Mark Murdock	8	2	6	0	.250	1988, 1989
Jim Hudson	1	1	0	0	1.000	1964
Mike Presley	1	1	0	0	1.000	1974
Zeke Martin	1	0	1	0	.000	1944
Andy White	1	0	1	0	.000	1966
Ted Constanzo	1	0	1	0	.000	1976
Donovan Forbes	1	0	1	0	.000	1989

== See also ==
- Texas Longhorns football statistical leaders
