= Duke Carlisle =

American football player (1941–2026)

No. 11
- Positions: Quarterback, defensive back

Personal information
- Born: December 13, 1941; Kaufman, Texas, U.S.
- Died: October 2, 2026 (aged 84); Lockhart, Texas, U.S.
- Listed height: 6 ft 1 in (1.85 m)
- Listed weight: 176 lb (80 kg)

Career information
- High school: Athens (Athens, Texas)
- College: Texas (1961–1963)
- NFL draft: 1964: 5th round, 60th overall pick
- AFL draft: 1964: 6th round, 42nd overall pick

Career history
- Green Bay Packers (1964)*; Dallas Cowboys (1964)*
- * Offseason or practice squad member only

Awards and highlights
- National champion (1963); 1964 Cotton Bowl Classic MVP; 1963 Academic All-American; Cotton Bowl All-Decade Team – 1960s; Cotton Bowl Hall of Fame – 2000; Southwest Conference champion (1961, 1962, 1963); Cotton Bowl Champion (1962, 1964)

Emmet Augustus "Duke" Carlisle III (December 13, 1941 – October 2, 2026) was an American college football player who started as a quarterback and defensive back for the Texas Longhorns in the early 1960s. He was the starting quarterback on Texas' first national championship team in 1963. In his final game, he set the NCAA record for most yards per pass completion in a bowl game and three Cotton Bowl records on his way to being named the game's Offensive MVP. He still holds the Cotton Bowl record for most yards per pass completion.

== Early life ==
Carlisle was born in Kaufman, Texas, but moved to Athens, Texas, in November 1955. He was called Duke to differentiate himself from his father and grandfather, both also named Emmett. At Athens, he played quarterback and led his high school to three consecutive district titles, as well as the state quarterfinals in his junior year.

== Football ==
Arriving at the University of Texas at Austin in 1960, Carlisle played on an undefeated freshman team. During his sophomore season in 1961, Carlisle was the starting safety and also saw some playing time as the third-string quarterback behind Mike Cotten and Tommy Wade.

In 1962, after Wade was injured in the preseason, Johnny Genung was named the starting quarterback, but a close call against Oklahoma led to head coach Darrell Royal naming Carlisle as the starter against #6 Arkansas in Little Rock. Down by 3 in the 4th quarter, Texas took over on their own 10 with Carlisle leading the Longhorns to midfield. He was then replaced by Genung who led the Longhorns down to the 3 yard line before handing the ball to running back Tommy Ford for the win. Carlisle sealed the game by intercepting Arkansas on the subsequent possession, but Genung was the hero and Carlisle wouldn't start at quarterback again until the next season. He did start every game on defense though.

By 1963 though, Carlisle had taken the starting quarterback role from Wade and started every game, earning 2nd team all-conference honors. He led the team to an 11–0 record and to Texas' first ever national title in football. Texas started the season ranked #5, but by the time the Red River Rivalry rolled around they were #2 and Oklahoma was #1. The game became the first #1 vs. #2 that Texas has ever played in, and after they won, Carlisle appeared on the cover of Sports Illustrated. Texas won the following six games to win both the Southwest Conference and National Championships. Perhaps Carlisle's most important contribution towards the national title came not behind center, but on defense. Against Baylor, in the only game (and only series) in which he played safety during his senior year, he had a game-saving end-zone interception to preserve a 7–0 win. Two weeks later against Texas A&M, Texas fell behind and Carlisle was pulled in favor of Wade. After Wade drove Texas to the 2-yard line and nearly threw the ball away, Carlisle came back in and scored the game-winning touchdown with a little more than a minute left. For the season, Carlisle was named he team's MVP and he finished fifth in Heisman Trophy voting for the Southwest region but did not have enough votes to crack the top 10.

Carlisle saved his best game for last against #2 Navy in the 1964 Cotton Bowl, played only six weeks after John F. Kennedy's assassination a few miles away. This would be the 2nd #1 vs. #2 game in Texas history and the only season in which Texas ever played in two such games. Though overshadowed by Heisman trophy winner Roger Staubach, Carlisle was the star of the day. On the 6th play of the game, Carlisle threw a 58-yard TD pass to Phil Harris. In the 2nd quarter, on an identical play, he threw a 63-yard touchdown pass, again to Harris. He passed for 213 yards and 2 touchdowns and rushed for another 54 yards and a touchdown, for 267 all purpose yards and 3 touchdowns – and he sat out much of the 2nd half. For comparison, in the previous 10 games that season he had amassed only 415 yards and 4 touchdowns. He was named Outstanding Back in the game averaging a then NCAA-record 30.4 yards per completion. He still holds the Cotton Bowl Record for yards per completion.

Carlisle's final record as a Texas starting quarterback was a perfect 12–0.

After the season was over, he was selected as a quarterback in the annual College All-Star Football Game in Chicago.

=== Records ===
- UT – Most net yards passing in a bowl game (219), surpassed by Bret Stafford in 1986
- **UT – Most yards per pass completion in a bowl game (7 completions minimum) (30.4)**
- UT – Most wins without a loss, career (12–0), surpassed by James Street in 1969
- UT – Lowest Percentage of Passes Had Intercepted, season (5.1%) (50 attempts minimum), surpassed by Eddie Phillips in 1970
- UT – Lowest Percentage of Passes Had Intercepted, career (3.4%) (100 attempts minimum), surpassed by Richard Walton in 1998
- **Cotton Bowl – Most yards per pass completion (10 attempts minimum) (30.4)**
- Cotton Bowl – Most yards on touchdown passes (121), surpassed by Street in 1969
- Cotton Bowl – Most net yards passing 1st half (164), surpassed by Kevin Murray in 1986
- NCAA – Most yards per pass completion in a bowl game (7 completions minimum) (30.4), tied by Tony Rice of Notre Dame in 1989; surpassed by Chris McCoy of Navy in 1996 Aloha Bowl

Bold indicates the record still stands.

== Pro career ==
The Green Bay Packers drafted Carlisle in the fifth round (60th overall) of the 1964 NFL draft, and the Kansas City Chiefs drafted him in the 6th round (42nd overall) of the 1964 AFL draft. He was signed by the Packers, but was cut in training camp. The Dallas Cowboys picked him up, but he spent the entire 1964 season on the taxi squad before an injury ended his career.

== Later life and death ==
In 1965, after leaving the NFL, Carlisle returned to UT and earned an M.B.A. He then applied to the U.S. Army's Medical Service Corps, rather than waiting to be drafted, and was sent to Germany for three years. He assumed he would be shipped to Vietnam, but the call never came.

After a stint from 1969 to 1973 as an investment banker with Merrill Lynch in New York City and then Dallas, Carlisle joined his father-in-law in the oil business in McComb, Mississippi.

His brother Todd played football at Mississippi and his nephew, Cooper Carlisle, was a standout football player at Florida who played in the NFL.

In 1974 Duke was inducted into the University of Texas Athletic Hall of fame; in 2000, he was inducted into the Cotton Bowl Hall of Fame; and in 2008, the field house at Athens High School was named for him.

Carlisle died from lung cancer on October 2, 2026, at the age of 84.
