= Ted Constanzo =

American football player (born c. 1956)

No. 12
- Positions: Quarterback, punter

Personal information
- Listed weight: 190 lb (86 kg)

Career information
- High school: Churchill
- College: Texas (1975–1979)

Ted Louis Constanzo (born c. 1956) is an American former football player and coach who started as quarterback and later at punter for the Texas Longhorns in the late 1970s and became a high school football coach in Texas

== Early life ==
Ted Constanzo was a star quarterback at Churchill High School in San Antonio, where his father was a teacher. He quarterbacked his team for two years, earning player-of-the-week, all-district and, in 1974, all state honors after passing for 1,117 yards, one of the 10 best seasons in Texas 5A history at the time. He was also the team's punter and led his team to the playoffs twice. He played in the 1974 Texas High School Coaches Association All-Star game and won the Thom McAn award as the city's outstanding high school football player. He had a strong arm and was a blue-chip college recruit for his passing.

Constanzo was an all-around athlete, who was also a star of the track and field team where he competed in, among other things, the pole vault, and he lettered in both baseball and basketball.

== College career ==
Ted Constanzo arrived at Texas at 1975 and immediately moved into the role of backup to Marty Akins because Mike Presley, who backed up Akins in 1974, had decided to leave football to focus on his education. He gained experience in blow-out wins over Colorado State, Utah State and Rice, replacing Akins late in all three games. Late in the season, he was pressed into duty against TCU when Akins hurt his knee. He led the number 7 Longhorns to a win, but he had difficulty handling the Wishbone offense. Two weeks later, he again replaced Akins when Akins re-injured his knee early in the second quarter against number 2, undefeated Texas A&M. Although the sensational Aggie defense held running back great Earl Campbell to well under 100 yards rushing, the Longhorn defense likewise kept the Aggies from running away with the game in the 20-10 loss. Constanzo threw 3 interceptions in that loss.

Akins graduated and in spring 1976 Constanzo was named the starter for the next season. Royal also considered him the starter during summer practice. However, just before the season started he was beat out for the starting position by Mike Cordaro, primarily because of Cordaro's speed. He backed Cordaro up for most of the season, playing late in a blowout win over Rice. His first chance to regain the starting position came against Texas Tech, when he took over for Cardoro in the first quarter. Despite losing Earl Campbell before halftime he was twice able to help Texas retake the lead, but Texas couldn't hold on and lost, 31–28. Constanzo played well enough to earn his only career start at quarterback the next week in a 30–0 loss to Houston in which he shared quarterback duties with Cordaro. The following week, they were both benched in favor of freshman Mark McBath.

During spring practices in 1977 Constanzo was the back-up to McBath but in the following summer he injured his knee playing racquetball and had to have surgery to have it repaired. After missing most of the season, Akers planned to redshirt him. When McBath and back-up quarterbacks Jon Aune and Randy McEachern went down with injuries, Akers decided to start true freshman Sam Ansley against Baylor instead of the recovering Constanzo to preserve his medical redshirt. Constanzo had to burn his redshirt anyway, and use a whole season of eligibility, during that game to fill in not as quarterback, but as punter for an injured Russell Erxleben. During the fourth quarter of that game he also took a few snaps at quarterback and threw no passes. It would be the last time he'd take a snap as quarterback in his career, finishing with a record of 0–1 as a starter. He did continue to replace Erxleben the following week against Texas A&M.

During spring practice in 1978, Constanzo and McBath were the back-ups to Sam Ansley, with Aune expected to start the season when he recovered from his knee injury. He sat the season out, eventually redshirting, but was still considered, along with John Goodson, the back-up punter to Erxleben.

In 1979, he started out as a backup quarterback and punter. John Goodson started the season as the starting place-kicker and punter, but after he averaged 32.5 yards per punt through the first two games, Akers began to let Constanzo punt. They shared punting duties in 5 of the next 6 games, with Constanzo sitting out the SMU game, but during the last four games, including the Sun Bowl, Constanzo was the team's only punter. It was during the Sun Bowl that he kicked his career best, a 60-yard punt.

=== Records ===
- UT – Touchdown passes by a true freshman (3), surpassed by David Ash in 2011

== Later life ==
After college, Constanzo enlisted in the Army and then became a football coach and teacher. In the Army, he spent three years of active duty and 17 in the reserves. He was a combat engineer officer before earning the rank of major. He left the Army and became a coach and teacher for more than 20 years. He was the athletic coordinator and head football coach at Spring Branch Middle School, where he led his team to two undefeated seasons, and then became an assistant football and baseball coach at Smithson Valley High School. In 2011, he became the head football coach and a teacher at TMI — The Episcopal School of Texas in San Antonio where he went 18-32 over 5 seasons before being replaced by Polo Gutierrez. He continued to teach middle and high school classes and serve as an assistant coach at TMI for some time after that.
