= Mike Cotten =

American football player (1939–2024)

Profile
- Positions: Quarterback, defensive back, Return specialist

Personal information
- Born: December 12, 1939; Uvalde, Texas, U.S.
- Died: May 25, 2024 (aged 84); Austin, Texas
- Listed height: 5 ft 10 in (1.78 m)
- Listed weight: 189 lb (86 kg)

Career information
- High school: Stephen F. Austin
- College: Texas (1959–1961)

Awards and highlights
- First-team All-SWC (1961); Offensive MVP - 1962 Cotton Bowl; 1962 Cotton Bowl Classic Champion; 1961 Southwest Conference Champion; 1960 Bluebonnet Bowl Champion

Michael Barry Cotten (December 12, 1939 – May 25, 2024) was an American football player who was the starting quarterback for the Texas Longhorns and the Quantico Marines in the early 1960s. He was an All-Southwest Conference back in 1961 and the Outstanding Back/Offensive MVP in the 1962 Cotton Bowl.

== Early life ==
Mike Cotten was born in Uvalde, Texas, in 1939 but after moving with his family to Amarillo in 1943 he landed in Austin in 1946, with a 1-year detour to Abilene in 1949, and went to high school in Austin and, by coincidence lived in the same neighborhood as Darrell Royal at the time. He was an All-District, All-State and All-America quarterback who led Austin High School to the state semi-finals and their last playoff win in of the 20th century. Widely recruited, the only campus he visited was Texas.

Cotten also played catcher and center field on the school's state championship baseball team. In 1957, he tied the state record for most doubles in the playoffs with 2, a record that wasn't broken until 2002. He made the all-tournament team his senior year and played a little baseball in college. In high school, he also ran track and played basketball.

== Football ==
As a freshman, Mike Cotten led the freshman team – the Yearlings – to their first undefeated team since 1941.

In Mike Cotten's second year he was one of four players to take snaps under center, but he was the primary backup to starter Bobby Lackey. He also played defensive back - leading the team with 4 interceptions that season - and returned punts and kickoffs on a team that went 9–2, and finished No. 4 in the nation before losing to No. 1 Syracuse in the Cotton Bowl.

For the next two years Cotten was the starting quarterback for Texas and, in the second year, ran Royal's first great innovation – the Flip Flop offense, a winged-T formation that simplified the offense. In 1960, the Longhorns went 7–3–1 for a disappointing 2nd-place finish in the Southwest Conference and finished the season with a 3–3 tie against No. 9 Alabama in the school's first Bluebonnet Bowl appearance. Cotten led the team in total offense and scoring.

In 1961 Cotten was quarterback and co-captain of the first Darrell Royal Longhorn team to contend for the national title. The team, powered by All-American Jimmy Saxton, went 10–1 and rose to No. 1 in the rankings for the first time since 1946. After beating everyone but Oklahoma by at least 3 touchdowns and with only two very beatable teams left on the schedule, they seemed to be a lock to finish the season ranked No. 1. But they suffered their only loss in a shocking 6–0 upset at the hands of 24-point underdog TCU on a trick play. Despite the disappointment of that loss, Cotten led the Southwest Conference in passing touchdowns and total touchdowns, became an All-Conference selection at back and led the team to a share of the conference championship with Arkansas. Texas went to the Cotton Bowl, by virtue of their head-to-head victory over the Razorbacks, and there Cotten ran the offense with such efficiency that he was named the Outstanding back in the team's 12–7 win over No. 5 Mississippi. It was Royal's first bowl victory.

A few weeks later he led the South to a 42–7 victory in the Senior Bowl, throwing five completions for 76 yards and a touchdown.

Cotten was 17–4–1 at Texas as the starting quarterback and won every game he ever played against rivals Oklahoma and Texas A&M.

He was inducted into the Longhorn Hall of Honor in 1981.

=== Records ===
- **UT – Fewest Passes had intercepted, season (2) (min 75 attempts), later tied by Tommy Wade, James Brown and Chance Mock**
- UT – Highest Average Gain Per Pass Attempt (min. 50 attempts), season (9.3), surpassed by Randy McEachern in 1977
- UT – Highest Average Gain Per Pass Completion (min. 30 completions), season (16.8), surpassed by James Street in 1969
- UT – Highest Percentage of Passes Completed (min. 70 attempts), season (57.1%), surpassed by Shannon Kelley in 1987
- Cotton Bowl – Most passes had intercepted, game (3), tied Buzz Buivid and Glynn Griffing; later tied by Kenny Stabler, Bobby Scott, Wade and Randy McEachern; surpassed by Joe Montana in 1979
- Cotton Bowl – Most passes had intercepted, career (3), tied Buivid and Griffing; later tied by Joe Theismann, Wade, Stabler, Scott and McEachern; surpassed by Montana in 1979

Bold means current record.

== Later life ==
Undrafted by the NFL, Cotten graduated from Texas in 1962 and after joining a Marine Corps program as a freshman, received a commission from the Marines. They granted him a deferral so that he could go to law school. He studied for his juris doctor from the University of Texas School of Law while serving as a graduate assistant football coach for Texas. When he graduated in 1964, his deferment ended and the Marines sent him to The Basic School at Quantico where he played on the Quantico Marines football team. That team went 6–5, with victories over Dayton and Villanova, and it ended the season with an upset of Memphis State, thus denying them a trip to the Liberty Bowl.

Captain Cotten then did a tour in Vietnam and was stationed in Da Nang where he served in a legal billet.

When Cotten's tour of duty was completed in 1968, he returned to Austin, Texas, and became a lawyer with Clark, Thomas & Winters, a firm that focuses on civil practice such as regulatory and state agency work. He became a partner in 1975.

Cotten died on May 25, 2024, at the age of 84.
