= Michael Brewer =

American football player (born 1992)

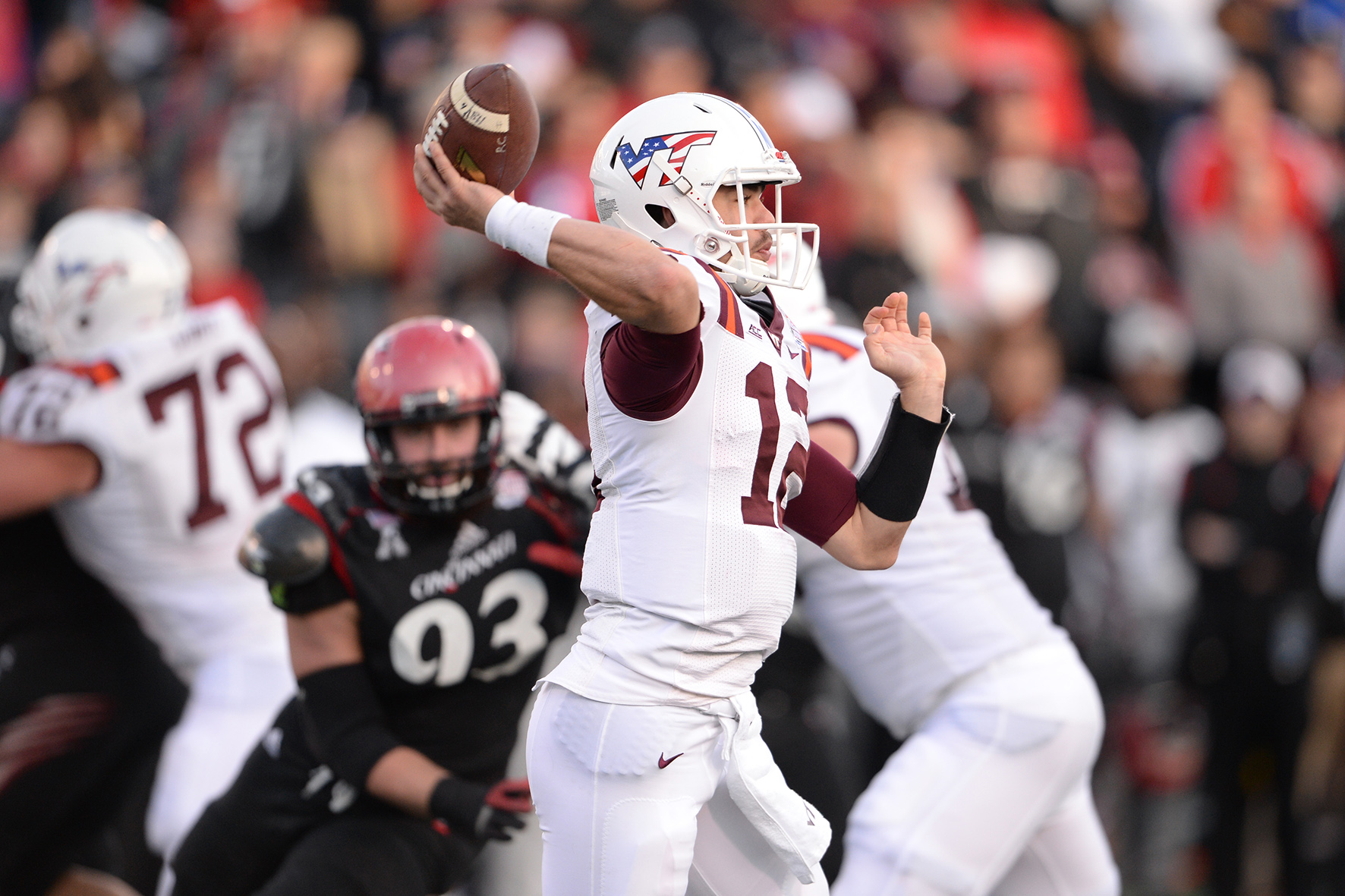
- Brewer passes the ball during the 2014 Military Bowl

No. 16, 12
- Position: Quarterback

Personal information
- Born: November 13, 1992 (age 33); Austin, Texas, U.S.
- Listed height: 6 ft 1 in (1.85 m)
- Listed weight: 198 lb (90 kg)

Career information
- High school: Lake Travis (Austin, Texas)
- College: Texas Tech (2011–2013); Virginia Tech (2014–2015)
- Stats at ESPN

Michael Brewer (born November 13, 1992) is an American former football quarterback. He played college football at Virginia Tech and was their starting quarterback from 2014 to 2015. Prior to that he played at Texas Tech from 2011 to 2013.

== College career ==
=== Texas Tech ===
Brewer was redshirted as a freshman in 2011. He spent the 2012 season serving as the backup quarterback to Seth Doege. In Summer 2013, Brewer injured his back, which kept him sidelined for the first month of the 2013 season. He was projected to be the starting quarterback before the injury. By the time he returned, freshman quarterbacks Baker Mayfield and Davis Webb had entrenched their positions at the top of the quarterback depth chart. On March 2, 2014, Brewer announced that he would be transferring to Virginia Tech.

=== Virginia Tech ===
Brewer had a rocky go around in his first season at Virginia Tech. Some highlights of his 2014–2015 season with the Virginia Tech Hokies football team consisted of defeating the future National Champions of that season, the Ohio State Buckeyes, in Columbus, OH. Brewer and the Hokies were the only team to defeat Ohio State the entire season, and it was the first time since 1979 that the Buckeyes had lost their home opener. Brewer and the Hokies also defeated the #19 ranked Duke Blue Devils in Durham, NC. Of the 6 losses for the season for the Virginia Tech Hokies, 5 of those losses were by 7 points or less (the exception was losing to the Miami Hurricanes in Blacksburg, VA by 24 points).

On September 7, 2015, Brewer suffered a broken collarbone during the 2015 season opener against the Ohio State Buckeyes. It was revealed after the game that Brewer would require surgery and he was expected to be sidelined between four and eight weeks. He missed a total of five games before making an appearance in relief duty on October 17 against Miami. A week later, he returned to the field as the starting quarterback. In the ACC Coastal Division match-up against Duke, Brewer went 24/45 for 270 yards and 3 touchdowns in a 45-43 4OT loss. In his final game, he led Virginia Tech to a victory in the Independence Bowl, in what would be Frank Beamer's final game as a coach.

== Personal life ==
Brewer's father, Robert Brewer, grandfather, Charley Brewer, and uncle, Rob Moerschell, played quarterback at Texas. His brother Charlie Brewer was a quarterback at Baylor and Utah.
