= Johnny Genung =

American football player (born 1941)

No. 14
- Position: Quarterback
- Class: 1963

Personal information
- Born: June 4, 1941 (age 85); Anadarko, Oklahoma, U.S.
- Listed height: 5 ft 11 in (1.80 m)
- Listed weight: 181 lb (82 kg)

Career information
- High school: Wichita Falls (TX)
- College: Texas (1960–1963)

Awards and highlights
- 1962 Academic All-SWC Honorable Mention; Shares school record for fewest Passes had intercepted, season; 1961 Co-Southwest Conference Championship; 1962 Southwest Conference Championship

John Allen Genung is an American former football player who is primarily known for playing quarterback for the Texas Longhorns from 1960 to 1962.

== Early life ==
A native of Anadarko, OK, Genung moved to Wichita Falls, TX when he was five years old. Genung played tailback and quarterback on the Wichita Falls High School 1958 Texas state high school football championship team (Class AAAA). He was All-District, All-State and an All-American in football, and was voted one of the top backs in the annual Oil Bowl game after his senior year. He also played shortstop on the baseball team.

Serious about being a doctor, he didn't decide to play football in college until the August before his freshman year.

== College career ==
In 1959, Genung played on the undefeated freshman team and during the 1960 and 1961 seasons at Texas, he was the backup quarterback to Mike Cotten. His most important play of the 1960 came in the final seconds of the Bluebonnet Bowl. Tied at 3-3, Texas got the ball on their own 48 yard line with 28 seconds left and sent Genung in. He had already caught a 38-yard pass in that game (the only reception of his career) and now had a chance to win it. He threw two Hail Mary passes, both of which were incomplete, but the second drew a pass interference call. With no time left on the clock, Texas had a shot at a game-winning field goal from Alabama's 18, but the kick was wide left.

Genung saw increased playing time in 1961, especially in games against California and Texas Tech, but he suffered a setback when he missed the last three games of 1961 with a back injury. In the same year, he was an Academic All-American nominee.

In spring training prior to the 1962 season, he broke his arm while vying for the starting quarterback job; but a preseason injury to Tommy Wade moved Genung into the position. He started the first four games, all victories, and led Texas to the #1 ranking. But a close call against Oklahoma led Darrell Royal to replace him with Duke Carlisle against #6 Arkansas the following week. Down by 3 in the 4th quarter, Texas took over on their own 10 with Carlisle leading the Longhorns to midfield. He was then replaced by Genung who led the Longhorns down to the 3 yard line before handing the ball to running back Tommy Ford for the win. Carlisle sealed the game by intercepting Arkansas on the subsequent possession, but Genung was the hero and reclaimed the starting role. A 14–14 tie to Rice the following week would cost Texas its #1 ranking and the National Championship. Two games later Genung was replaced by Wade as the starter. But Genung's season was not over. In the last game of the season, Genung replaced Wade in the 3rd quarter of the Texas A&M game and led the team to a come-from-behind victory to win the Southwest Conference Championship and complete their first undefeated regular season since 1923. As a result of his play in that game, Genung was named the starter in his final against #7 LSU in the Cotton Bowl. It was a tough game for Genung and the Longhorns. Genung drove Texas into scoring position on the 2nd drive, but the field goal attempt failed. The Longhorns fell behind and Genung was replaced by Wade to make the offense more pass-oriented. Texas lost 13–0.

After his senior year, he was quarterback of the Southwest All-Stars football team in the first, and only, Southwest Challenge Bowl in Corpus Christi. That All-Star game pitted players from the Southwest Conference and other Texas teams against a team made up of players from around the nation. Genung was a last-minute replacement for injured Arkansas quarterback Billy Moore. The Southwesterners lost 33–13.

Genung graduated with a 5-1-1 record as a starter.

== Later life ==
After college, Genung went to medical school at Southwestern Medical School in Dallas and graduated in 1967. He was studying at Parkland Hospital in 1963 when President John F. Kennedy was rushed there following his assassination. He did a one-year internship at the Veterans Administration Hospital in Dallas and a year of residency in orthopedics at Parkland before entering the Navy in 1969. As a lieutenant he served as the team doctor for the United States Naval Academy football team, and went with them when they played Texas later that year. Later, he went into private practice as an orthopedic surgeon in Austin.

In 2004, Genung was inducted into the Longhorns' "Hall of Honor".
