= Donovan Forbes =

American football player

No. 8
- Position: Quarterback

Personal information
- Listed height: 6 ft 2 in (1.88 m)
- Listed weight: 215 lb (98 kg)

Career information
- High school: Baytown Sterling
- College: Texas (1986–1989)

Donovan Barrington Forbes is an American former football quarterback. He was the starting quarterback of the Texas Longhorns for one game in 1989, and a backup from 1986–1989. He was the second black quarterback to ever start a game for the University of Texas.

== High school ==
Donovan Forbes was a three-sport star athlete at Baytown Sterling where he made all-District in football, basketball and baseball. He was voted to the 1985 Texas High School All-Star team by the Texas High School Coaches Association and was ranked as one of the top ten quarterback recruits in the South. As a sophomore, he played defensive back and he started at quarterback in both his junior and senior years of high school. He was also a starter on the basketball team where he earned All-District first team honors and a star pitcher in baseball as well.

== College Football ==
Forbes was a tall, strong-armed quarterback adept at running the option whose career never met up to its promise as he struggled with weight, injuries, academic issues, fumbles and limited opportunities.

After redshirting for the 1985 season he spent 1986 as a back-up quarterback to Bret Stafford. He first saw playing time in the Oklahoma game in which he and Stafford combined to complete a then school record 22 of 39 passes in a losing effort. He saw limited action in 3 other games that season.

Forbes played in only one game, against Oregon State, in 1987, and only two games in 1988. But he played an important, if infamous, role in the last of those 1988 games. In the final game of the season, against in-state rival Texas A&M, Texas had come back from a 28-point deficit to trail by only 4 with 4 minutes left. With Texas threatening to score again, Forbes was brought into the game with Texas on the Aggies 34 yard line and 3:20 left in the game. On a 3rd down option play, Forbes made a bad pitch which the Aggies recovered, and Texas never got the ball back again. Texas finished the season at 4–7, its worst record since 1956.

In spring practices in 1989, Forbes had performed well, and he was expected by most to compete for the starting job in the fall, but he was then dismissed from school for academic reasons in May and was only able to play in the fall after a successful appeal. He came into the summer practices still expected by some to start, but didn't get his chance until the end of the season; and then, only because of injuries to starting quarterback Peter Gardere. Late in the season against TCU, Gardere suffered a shoulder injury in the 2nd quarter and backup Mark Murdock was ineffective, giving Forbes his chance. He rallied the Longhorns from a 17–10 deficit, completing 8 of 9 passes for 117 yards including a 36-yard touchdown pass to Kerry Cash to win 31–17 and was then named the Associated Press Southwest Conference offensive player of the week. A minor quarterback controversy arose as a result, but despite Forbes' play the week before, Gardere got the start against Baylor the next week. Texas got off to a bad start and Gardere was pulled in the first half for Forbes who wasn't able to do much better as Texas lost 50–7. In the last game of the season and the final game of his career, Forbes finally got his one chance to start when Peter Gardere was ailing. Texas took an early lead in that game, and was up 10–7 at halftime, but could not overcome several miscues from every aspect including two missed field goals, a wide open A&M receiver in the UT secondary, a penalty for too many people on the field that turned a botched A&M punt into another TD for A&M, and three interceptions and a fourth down pass incompletion by Forbes.
