= Tommy Wade =

American football player (born 1942)

No. 16
- Position: Quarterback

Personal information
- Born: May 23, 1942 (age 84); Henderson, Texas, U.S.
- Listed height: 6 ft 2 in (1.88 m)
- Listed weight: 195 lb (88 kg)

Career information
- High school: Henderson
- College: Texas (1960-1963)
- NFL draft: 1964: undrafted

Career history
- Pittsburgh Valley Ironmen (1964); Pittsburgh Steelers (1964–1965)

Awards and highlights
- National champion (1963)

Career NFL statistics
- Passing attempts: 69
- Passing completions: 34
- Completion percentage: 49.3%
- TD–INT: 2–13
- Passing yards: 470
- Passer rating: 41.6
- Stats at Pro Football Reference

Thomas Virgil Wade (born May 23, 1942) is an American former professional football player who was a quarterback for two seasons with the Pittsburgh Steelers of the National Football League (NFL). He played college football for the Texas Longhorns, playing on their national championship team in 1963. He is perhaps best known as a backup quarterback who engineered a fourth-quarter touchdown drive in the Longhorns' final regular season game of 1963 to win the game and the national title.

== Early life ==
Tommy Wade was born in Henderson, Texas, in 1942. He was an offensive tackle in junior high who didn't move to quarterback until his sophomore year in high school. He was recruited to play football by almost every Southwest Conference school and chose Texas because he was promised he could play baseball there. He was an accomplished baseball player who once pitched and won both games of a double-header.

== College career ==
After a year on the undefeated Texas freshman team in 1960 and a year on the 1961 Texas Longhorn baseball team, Tommy Wade became the back-up quarterback to Mike Cotten in 1961, and played a few downs on defense. During his sophomore year Darrell Royal wanted him to take part in spring practice, so Wade gave up on being a pitcher in college, though he continued to play semi-pro ball in the summer.

In 1962, despite a broken ankle suffered in the spring, Wade was expected to be the starter, but was sidelined by a preseason injury. He didn't get his first start at quarterback until November, though he did play some quarterback and defense in the early games. In his first game as starter he set the school record for most attempts in a game and threw for 195 yards. He led the team to three straight wins against Baylor, TCU and Texas A&M and helped Texas to win the 1962 Southwest Conference Championship and finish its first undefeated regular season since 1923. He also tied the school record for fewest interceptions thrown in a season(2). In the Cotton Bowl, which Wade did not start, the ineffective Texas offense was held scoreless and Wade tied the Cotton Bowl record for most interceptions in a game(3) as the Longhorns lost 13-0. He threw more interceptions in the Cotton Bowl than he did in the entirety of the season.

In 1963, Wade lost the starting quarterback job to classmate Duke Carlisle and saw his playing time significantly curtailed. He played in most games, getting in when Royal wanted to emphasize the pass, but specialized in the two-minute offense.

Wade, however, played a key role that year in helping Texas to beat Texas A&M and win the National title. When Texas fell behind late in the 4th quarter, Carlisle was pulled in favor of Wade. Starting on Texas' 20, Wade drove Texas to the 50 yard line before throwing an interception that seemed to seal defeat. But the Aggie defender attempted a lateral that Texas recovered thus preserving the drive. Wade then took Texas to the 2-yard line of Texas A&M, but after he nearly threw the ball away again, Carlisle came back in and scored the game-winning touchdown with a little more than a minute left. With their perfect season preserved, they were crowned national champions.

Wade finished with a 3-0 record as the Texas starting quarterback.

=== Records ===
- **UT - Fewest Passes had intercepted, season (2) (min 75 attempts), tied Mike Cotten; later tied by James Brown and Chance Mock**
- Cotton Bowl - Most passes had intercepted, game (3), tied Buzz Buivid, Cotten and Glynn Griffing; later tied by Kenny Stabler, Bobby Scott and Randy McEachern; surpassed by Joe Montana in 1979
- Cotton Bowl - Most passes had intercepted, career (3), tied Buivid, Cotten and Griffing; later tied by Joe Theismann, Stabler, Scott and McEachern; surpassed by Montana in 1979

Bold means current record

== Professional career ==
In 1964 Wade was signed by the Pittsburgh Steelers where former Longhorn quarterback Bobby Layne was an assistant coach. With the exception of 1 game, he spent his first year either on the taxi squad or playing for the minor league Pittsburgh Valley Ironmen. With the Ironmen he went 5-3 as a starter, 85 of 171 passing for 1,912 yards with 10 touchdown pases, 3 interceptions and a rushing TD. At the end of the season, he was named to the Atlantic Coast Football League's All-Star Team.

He played in 4 more games in 1965 including 2 starts, both losses, in his final two games. In his first game as starter, he set the franchise record for most interceptions in a game with 7. Following a change of coaches, he was released from the team in the following preseason.

=== Records ===
- Pittsburgh Steelers - Most passes had intercepted, game (7)

== Later life ==
Wade went into the insurance business back in his hometown of Henderson, TX. In the 1990s he switched careers to education, serving as a coach for 6 years and then becoming an intermediate school principal with the Bullard Independent School District.

His sons went on to play college basketball and baseball.
