= Athens High School (Texas) =

Public school in Texas, United States

Coordinates: 32.2008°N 95.8453°W

Location
- 708 E College St. Athens, Texas 75751-2687; United States

Information
- School type: Public high school
- School district: Athens Independent School District
- Principal: Nicole Cornish
- Staff: 66.76 (FTE)
- Grades: 9-12
- Enrollment: 872 (2023–2024)
- Student to teacher ratio: 13.06
- Colors: Maroon & White
- Athletics conference: UIL Class AAAA
- Mascot: Hornet
- Yearbook: Athenian
- Website: www.athensisd.net/o/ahs/

Athens High School is a public high school located in Athens, Texas, United States and classified as a 4A school by the UIL. It is part of the Athens Independent School District located in central Henderson County. In 2015, the school was rated "Met Standard" by the Texas Education Agency.

The school was rebuilt in the 1950s because it burned down after being set fire by a student. The male student purposely lit the curtains in the gymnasium on fire, resulting in the whole building burning down.

== Fine Arts ==
- Band
  - The Athens High School Band competes in conference 4A. The band specializes in military style marching which is based on tradition with dignity and pride. The band marches at all Athens High School football games, UIL Marching contest and at local parades. During the spring semester, they perform several concerts and participate in UIL Concert and Sightreading contest
  - The band has been awarded the UIL "Sweepstakes" award for earning 1st division ratings in marching, concert and in sightreading competitions for the past 11 consecutive years
  - The band most recently performed in Washington, D.C., and has also performed at Universal Studios, Walt Disney World and in Chicago at the Field Museum.
  - Through 2017, the band under the direction of Rusty Lay has earned Sweepstakes awards for 12 consecutive years.

== Athletics ==
The Athens Hornets compete in these sports:

Cross Country, Volleyball, Football, Basketball, Powerlifting, Soccer, Golf, Tennis, Track, Softball and Baseball

== State titles ==
- Boys Basketball
  - 1927(All), 1929(All), 1931(All), 1933(All), 1934(All)
  - 1929 (National), 1930 (National)
- Boys Golf
  - 1956(1A), 1974(3A)
- Prose Interpretation
  - Dylan Godwin 2002(4A)
  - Adam Gibbs 2004(4A)
- One Act Play
  - 2009(3A)
- Policy Debate
  - 2014 (3A) – Meridith Mcdonald and Madalyn Mikkelsen
  - 2015, 2016, 2017 (4A) – Matthew Hernandez and True Head
  - 2024, 2025 (4A) – Cooper Rich and Isaac Hoch
- Congressional Debate
  - 2017 (4A) – Matthew Hernandez
- Persuasive Speaking
  - 2017 (4A) – Michael Pulver

== Notable alumni ==
- Duke Carlisle (class of 1959), former college football player at the University of Texas
- Adam Gibbs, actor
- Terrence McGee, former NFL player
- Barron Tanner, former NFL player
- Travis Tedford, former child actor, best known for playing Spanky McFarland in The Little Rascals

== Internet ==
- Athens High School has a Dedicated line network connection from Suddenlink Communications. This allows sharing of information and computer network resource between campuses with Active Directory.
