= Rick McIvor =

American football player (born 1960)

No. 14
- Position: Quarterback

Personal information
- Born: September 26, 1960 (age 66); Fort Davis, Texas, U.S.
- Listed height: 6 ft 4 in (1.93 m)
- Listed weight: 210 lb (95 kg)

Career information
- High school: Fort Stockton (Fort Stockton, Texas)
- College: Texas
- NFL draft: 1984: 3rd round, 80th overall pick

Career history
- St. Louis Cardinals (1984–1985); Los Angeles Rams (1987)*
- * Offseason or practice squad member only

Awards and highlights
- 1979 Sun Bowl; 1980 Bluebonnet Bowl; 1984 Cotton Bowl

Career NFL statistics
- Games: 6
- Passing attempts: 4
- Completions: 0
- Rushes: 3
- Yards: 5
- Passer rating: 39.6
- Stats at Pro Football Reference

Richard Edward McIvor (born September 26, 1960) is an American former professional football player who was a quarterback for the St. Louis Cardinals of the National Football League (NFL). He played college football for the Texas Longhorns. After his football career, he was the sheriff of Jeff Davis County, Texas.

== Early life ==
A native of Fort Davis, Texas, Rick McIvor was born Richard Edward Mueller, Jr, but changed his name when he became an adult to Richard Edward McIvor to match the name of his mother's 2nd husband, Don McIvor. He was raised almost entirely by his mother and his extended family. He prepped at Fort Stockton High School where he led the football team to the district championship his senior year. He started out as a running back and defensive back, but after Tate Randle graduated, he moved to quarterback to replace him. He was an all-around great athlete from an athletically-inclined family. McIvor made four All-American lists include Parade; and made All-State as both a Quarterback and Defensive Back, 2nd Team All-State as a kicker, and All-District as a punter and for basketball. He played baseball and ran on the 1978 State Champion mile relay team. His mother was a basketball and tennis coach and his sister was a two-sport athlete at Angelo State University. He grew up riding horses and roping cattle on his relatives' ranches around Fort Stockton.

== Longhorn career ==
McIvor arrived in Austin in 1979, as part of a highly touted class of quarterback recruits and was often considered as a player that could be moved to defense. He was also the team's back-up place kicker. But due to having exceptional arm strength, the 6 ft 4 in (1.93 m) McIvor showed promise in the 1979 Baylor game when, as a freshman, he played in place of Donnie Little and threw for 270 yards and so he remained a quarterback.

McIvor's first chance to shine came in the 1979 Texas Tech game when Coach Fred Akers used three quarterbacks to win 14-6. McIvor threw the game's only touchdown pass and most of the passing yards for Texas. A few weeks later, after backup quarterback Jon Aune moved to defensive back, McIvor replaced Little in the TCU game, when Little left with sore ankles, leading the team on an 80-yard touchdown drive and running the offense for most of the second half. His first career start came the next week against Baylor and McIvor played well, throwing for 270 yards, then a Texas record, and 1 touchdown in leading the team to a 13-0 win. He started the last two games of the season losing to A&M 13-7 and to Washington in the Sun Bowl 14-7.

In 1980, he again entered the season as the back-up to Little. He saw mop-up action in the 35-0 blowout over Oregon State and came in for relief of Little in losses against SMU and Texas Tech. He nearly led the team back from a 24-0 deficit in the Tech game, until he was poked in the eye and had to leave the game. He earned the starting job for the Houston game, which they won 15-13, but sat out the next two weeks due to an injury. He returned to share quarterback duties with Little for the losses to Baylor and Texas A&M to end the season. When Little was injured during the last game of the season, McIvor was again named the starting quarterback for the bowl game, which they again lost, this time to North Carolina in the Bluebonnet Bowl. That year, he was the Southwest Conferences highest rated quarterback with a 121.8 rating.

During the off-season, Little volunteered to move to wide receiver because he felt it would be his best shot at an NFL career, and McIvor became the starting quarterback for the 1981 season. After winning the first four games, including back-to-back wins over ranked Miami and Oklahoma, Texas was ranked #1. But McIvor's job was in danger after a disastrous 42–11 loss to unranked Arkansas in week 5. Texas won the next two games with McIvor under center, but he lost his position to walk-on Robert Brewer midway through the Houston game when he suffered an injury to his right shoulder and nerve damage to his neck. Texas was trailing when McIvor was pulled, but eventually closed with a 14-14 tie due to Brewer's efforts. It took him several games to recover from the injury and he threw only one more pass the rest of the season and it would more than 2 years before he would get a chance to start again.

Just before the start of the 1982 season, McIvor suffered a knee injury in practice that would require surgery to repair damaged ligaments, so he redshirted the 1982 season. He missed the following spring practice because his grade point average had dropped below the requirement for upperclassmen and he had to drop out of school for a semester. He went home and worked on his father's ranch.

In 1983, it appeared that McIvor would be the starting quarterback. But Todd Dodge was named the starter during summer practices after McIvor spent a couple of days in the hospital with an infected wrist and elbow. Later in the fall, a shoulder injury to Dodge in the final preseason scrimmage led to McIvor splitting time with his best friend Rob Moerschell in the first game of the season against Auburn. Despite an 80-yard touchdown pass McIvor threw in that game, one of the longest in Texas history, Moerschell emerged as the starter. Thanks to a head injury in the next game against North Texas, McIvor saw limited play for most of the season as the starting quarterback role went from Moerschell to Dodge and back to Moerschell. But, during the last game of the regular season, against in-state rival Texas A&M, McIvor replaced Moerschell when the #2 Longhorns fell behind 13–0 and played spectacularly. He led the undefeated Longhorns to score 45 unanswered points, throwing for 170 yards and a record 4 touchdown passes without any turnovers. He played so well that he was named the starter in the following game, the 1984 Cotton Bowl.

In his last game as a Longhorn, McIvor led #2 Texas against #7 Georgia in a game with National Championship implications. Texas held onto a small lead until late in the 4th quarter but a muffed punt return gave Georgia the opportunity it needed to score the game-winning touchdown. McIvor threw for 168 yards and 2 interceptions with no touchdowns. Later that day, #1 Nebraska was upset by #5 Miami, Fl, an outcome that would have secured Texas its 4th National Championship had they beaten Georgia.

McIvor finished his career at Texas with a record of 8–5–1 as a starter, but was 0-3 in bowl games.

=== Records ===
- UT - Touchdown Passes, Game (4), tied with Randy McEachern and Clyde Littlefield, tied later by Peter Gardere, surpassed by James Brown in 1995
- UT - Passing yards, Game (270), surpassed by Donnie Little in 1980
- UT - Most attempts, Game (38), surpassed by Bret Stafford in 1986

== Later life ==
Having made an impression with his strong arm and clutch play in the Texas A&M game, McIvor was selected 80th overall by the St. Louis Cardinals in the 1984 NFL draft. He went on to play two seasons in the NFL, but he only played in 6 games, and only threw four passes, none of which were completed. He was one of the last players cut by the Cardinals before the 1986 season.

He moved to Fort Davis, where he worked as a wildlife manager on the 06 Kokernot Ranch, which covers 120,000 acres in Jeff Davis, Pecos and Brewster counties. In 2008, he ran as a Democrat for the office of Sheriff of Jeff Davis County, Texas. He won and was re-elected in 2012. He is married and has two children, one of which is current Western Kentucky quarterback Maverick.
