= Robert Brewer (American football) =

American football quarterback

Profile
- Position: Quarterback
- Class: 1983

Personal information
- Listed height: 6 ft 0 in (1.83 m)
- Listed weight: 183 lb (83 kg)

Career information
- High school: Richardson (TX)
- College: Texas (1980–1982)

Awards and highlights
- Second-team All-SWC (1982); 1982 Fort Worth Kiwanis Club Sportsmanship Award; 1982 Cotton Bowl MVP; 1982 Texas Longhorn Football MVP; 1981 Southwest Conference Championship

Robert Edward Brewer is an American former football player. He played quarterback for the University of Texas Longhorns during the 1981 and 1982 season. He is the last walk-on quarterback to start for Texas and the last to start in the Cotton Bowl. His most memorable moment was the late touchdown he scored against Alabama to guide Texas to a 1982 Cotton Bowl Classic win. He is also the younger member of the only father-son combination to start at quarterback for Texas. Both father and son led Longhorn teams to victory over Bear Bryant coached teams (Charley against Texas A&M in 1954 and 1955 and Robert against Alabama in 1982).

== High school ==
Robert Brewer came from a football family. His father, Charles Brewer had been the starting quarterback at Texas from 1953–55 and his uncle George Brewer had played in the starting backfield with Darrell Royal at Oklahoma. A Richardson, Texas native, Brewer was barely recruited out of high school, and received no scholarship offers.

== College career ==
Never recruited by the school he loved, Brewer drove to Austin and convinced Coach Fred Akers to give him a shot. He made the Longhorns football team as a walk-on. Later he was awarded a scholarship and finally got his chance halfway through his junior season.

In 1980, he backed up Donnie Little but played in only one game, against TCU. It was during the 1981 season that Brewer became the starter. Texas won its first four games and became the consensus #1 team in the country with Rick McIvor at quarterback. During that time, Brewer played only a handful of downs. But then they lost badly to unranked Arkansas, with McIvor throwing 4 interceptions, allowing Brewer a chance to play in that game. A few weeks later, with Texas losing to Houston 14-0, Brewer went in for an injured McIvor and was able to rally the team to a 14-14 tie, completing 8 of 20 passes for 93 yards including the game-tying two-point conversion to tailback John Walker. Brewer became the team's starter and led them to three straight wins, a #6 ranking, a slim chance at the National Championship and a spot in the Cotton Bowl in place of conference champion Southern Methodist, who was on probation and ineligible that year.

The 1982 Cotton Bowl was arguably Brewer's best game and the first 200 yard passing game of his career. Down 10-0 in the 4th quarter against #3 Alabama, Brewer got the Longhorns down to Alabama's 30 yard line and then, on a QB draw play called "one" that wasn't even in the playbook, ran 30 yards for a touchdown. It was his longest running play of his career. Texas got the ball back a few minutes later and Brewer led the Longhorns 80 yards down the field, hitting four straight passes of 37, 10, 19, and 10 yards before Terry Orr ran it in from the 8-yard line for the game-winning touchdown. Texas finished 10-1-1 with a final No. 3 National Ranking and Brewer was named the Cotton Bowl MVP.

In 1982, Brewer was a team captain and threw for 12 TDs. He set UT records for attempts and yardage (1,415), and tied the mark for completions. He threw for more than 200 yards against Oklahoma and again against Baylor, including an 80 yard touchdown pass to Herkie Walls. Texas finished 9-2 that year and went to the Sun Bowl. But five days before that game, Brewer suffered a broken thumb in practice, ending his career one game early. His last game was an upset win at home against #6 Arkansas.

He went 13-2 as a starter.

=== Records ===
- UT - Highest Average Gain per pass completion, game (min 5. completions) (32.6), surpassed by Todd Dodge in 1985

== Later life ==
After graduation, Brewer went to work in the private sector before returning to UT as Assistant Athletic Director for development for seven years. He was in charge of raising funds through the Longhorn Foundation. He then became a financial adviser for Merrill Lynch in Austin. He is married to Laura Moerschell, the sister of former Texas quarterback Rob Moerschell.

One of Brewer's sons, Michael, graduated from high school as one of the top quarterback recruits in the United States for the 2011 Recruiting year. He went to Texas Tech, but after the 2013-14 season he announced his plans to transfer. He considered transferring to Texas, but was denied his transfer request by Texas Tech. He instead went to Virginia Tech, where he became the starting quarterback for the 2014 and 2015 seasons.

Another son, Charlie, Jr., was also a quarterback. In 2017, he began playing at Baylor and nearly led them to a come-from-behind upset of #23 West Virginia. He stayed at Baylor through the 2020 season, then spent a year at Utah and finished his career in 2022 at Liberty. He finished his career as a rookie at the 2023 training camp for the Ottawa Redblacks.
