= Andy White (American football) =

No. 12 – University of Texas at Austin
- Position: QB

Personal information
- Listed height: 6 ft 2 in (1.88 m)
- Listed weight: 195 lb (88 kg)

Career information
- High school: Lee High School (Houston)

Andrew Benjamin White, Jr. was a manager of advanced computer projects at the Los Alamos National Laboratory where he served as the Deputy Associate Director of the Theory, Simulation and Computing Directorate, and the Roadrunner Project Director from 2006-2012. Before that, he founded and served as Director of the Los Alamos Advanced Computing Laboratory (1989-1998) and Program Manager for the Department of Energy (DOE) High Performance Computing and Communications program. As a college student he had been a quarterback for the University of Texas Longhorns football team. He started one game in 1966 against the Oklahoma Sooners.

== Early life ==
White was the son of a prominent Houston lawyer and an exceptional student and athlete, who served as class president, tied for class valedictorian, and was a highly rated football player. Out of high school he was recruited by almost every team in the Southwest Conference, others in the Southeast and Mideast and by Ivy League schools like Yale, Princeton and Brown, but turned them down to go to Texas, where his father went, as a Plan II student, on an academic scholarship, and play football for Darrell Royal.

== Football career ==
In 1966, Andy White was a backup quarterback to fellow sophomore Bill Bradley. He saw limited action in the first two games of the season, missing on three passes and losing seven yards running. But then he took over when Bradley injured his knee during the 3rd quarter of the Indiana game. With the Longhorns up 14-0, White threw for one touchdown, completed 6 of 8 passes, and led an error-free offense to three touchdowns and a 35-0 win over Indiana. The following week against arch-rival Oklahoma, he got the first and only start of his career. Though White accounted for more than 150 yards of total offense, he also threw 2 interceptions and Oklahoma took an early lead. A late Texas rally capped by his only rushing touchdown narrowed the lead to 15-9, but Oklahoma came back to kick a game-cinching field goal and thus Oklahoma broke its streak of 8 straight losses in the Red River Rivalry. When Bradley came back, White again moved to the sidelines, coming in for a few plays over the next two games. With Bradley settled into the quarterback position, White was moved to wingback, and played in two more games before the end of the season, rushing for 20 yards.

In 1967, he was moved again, this time to tight end. He got into only one game, catching one 18 yard pass against Rice. In March 1968, faced with the prospect of being the #4 wingback, White quit the football team.

The summer before he graduated, Emory Bellard recruited White to help him refine the wishbone formation that would eventually help Texas win the 1969 National Championship.

== Science career ==
White finished his degree at Texas and then earned a PhD in applied mathematics from Caltech. He returned to Texas as a mathematics professor, before moving on to the Los Alamos National Laboratory in 1979 where he served as Program Manager for the Department of Energy (DOE) High Performance Computing and Communications program. Shortly after arriving at Los Alamos, White became deputy leader of a group that began LANL's research efforts into parallel processing. Finding the machines then available inadequate, White founded the Advanced Computing Laboratory in 1989 which utilized the first massively parallel computer suitable for scientific problems. He continued as director of the ACL until 1998 when he was appointed Director of the Laboratory's Delphi Project. White served as an Associate Director of the National Science Foundation (NSF) Science and Technology Center for Research on Parallel Computation, a member of the ad hoc Task Force on the Future of the NSF Supercomputing Centers (the Hayes Committee), Deputy Division Leader of Los Alamos' Computing Division, and Principal Investigator for the DOE High Performance Computing Research Center at Los Alamos. He became the Deputy Associate Laboratory Director for Theory, Simulation and Computation in 2006 and retired from LANL in 2012.
