= Mike Presley =

American football player (born 1953)

Michael Austin Presley
No. 14 – University of Texas at Austin
- Position: QB

Personal information
- Born: May 10, 1953 (age 73); Dallas, Texas, U.S.
- Listed height: 6 ft 2 in (1.88 m)
- Listed weight: 194 lb (88 kg)

Career information
- High school: Grand Prairie High School

Awards and highlights
- Championships: 1973 Southwest Conference Championship; Bowls: 1974 Cotton Bowl; 1974 Gator Bowl

Michael Austin Presley (born May 10, 1953) is a former football player who started as quarterback for the Texas Longhorns in two games in 1974.

== Early life ==
Mike Presley played high school football at Grand Prairie High School in Grand Prairie, Texas, where he was the starting quarterback for three years. During this stretch, Presley guided his team to a district championship and the school's most wins in AAAA competition. He was the All-District quarterback twice and honorable mention once, first team All-Greater Dallas twice and honorable mention once, first team All-Metro, Player of the Week, and second team all-district for defence once. He also was named to the Super Team in Texas Football magazine and played in the annual Texas High School Coaches All-Star Game. . He received dozens of scholarship offers but was only interested in Texas which he hoped would help him play professional football.

== College career ==
Mike Presley arrived at Texas with high expectations, but numerous injuries and tough competition limited his playing time. He managed to start two games, but left the program before his eligibility was used up.

During his freshman year, the last one in which freshmen were not allowed to play varsity, Mike Presley competed with Adrian Ford for the starting quarterback position on the freshman team, but after winning it, he injured his shoulder and wound up splitting time with Ford all season.

In 1972, Presley played well in the spring, moving into the #2 position when Ford was moved to defense. But then he suffered a case of tendonitis and found himself demoted behind freshman Marty Akins. That season, he was officially the 3rd string quarterback, but he redshirted and never took the field.

In 1973, Mike Presley was the back-up to starting quarterback Akins, but the two shared the quarterback position in most games, with Presley getting about 1/3 of the snaps. He suffered some minor injuries during the season, including a pulled muscle and broken nose, but was able to keep playing. After both quarterbacks struggled in the 1974 Cotton Bowl, Presley took over in the 4th quarter, because he was seen as the better passer.

After Presley played well in the Cotton Bowl, he came into spring practice with a real chance to earn the starting position. But, on the third day of practice, he suffered a strained ligament in his ankle and missed the remainder of the spring. Given another chance in the fall, he injured his groin, again ceding the starting position to Akins. However, in the first game of 1974 Akins suffered a concussion in the 2nd quarter and Presley, a favorite with students, replaced him, leading the Longhorns from a 3-0 deficit to a win over Boston College. The following week, Presley got the first start of his career, and quarterbacked the team to a 34-7 win over Wyoming. Presley played well, and so was given the start the following week against Texas Tech, but when the Longhorns fell behind 26-3 and Presley was sacked after holding the ball too long, Coach Darrel Royal pulled him from the game and replaced him with Akins who was unable to bring the Longhorns back. Akins returned as the starter the following week and he and Presley shared quarterbacking duties for most of the season.

After the 1974 season, Presley decided to leave football to focus on his education. Presley finished his career with a 1-1 record as a starter.

After school, Presley became a financial professional, registered as a Broker-Dealer Agent, in Austin, Texas. His son, Michael Austin Presley, Jr. played college baseball at Hutchinson Community College, St. Edwards University in Austin, Texas and at Kansas State.
