= Shannon Kelley =

American football player and coach

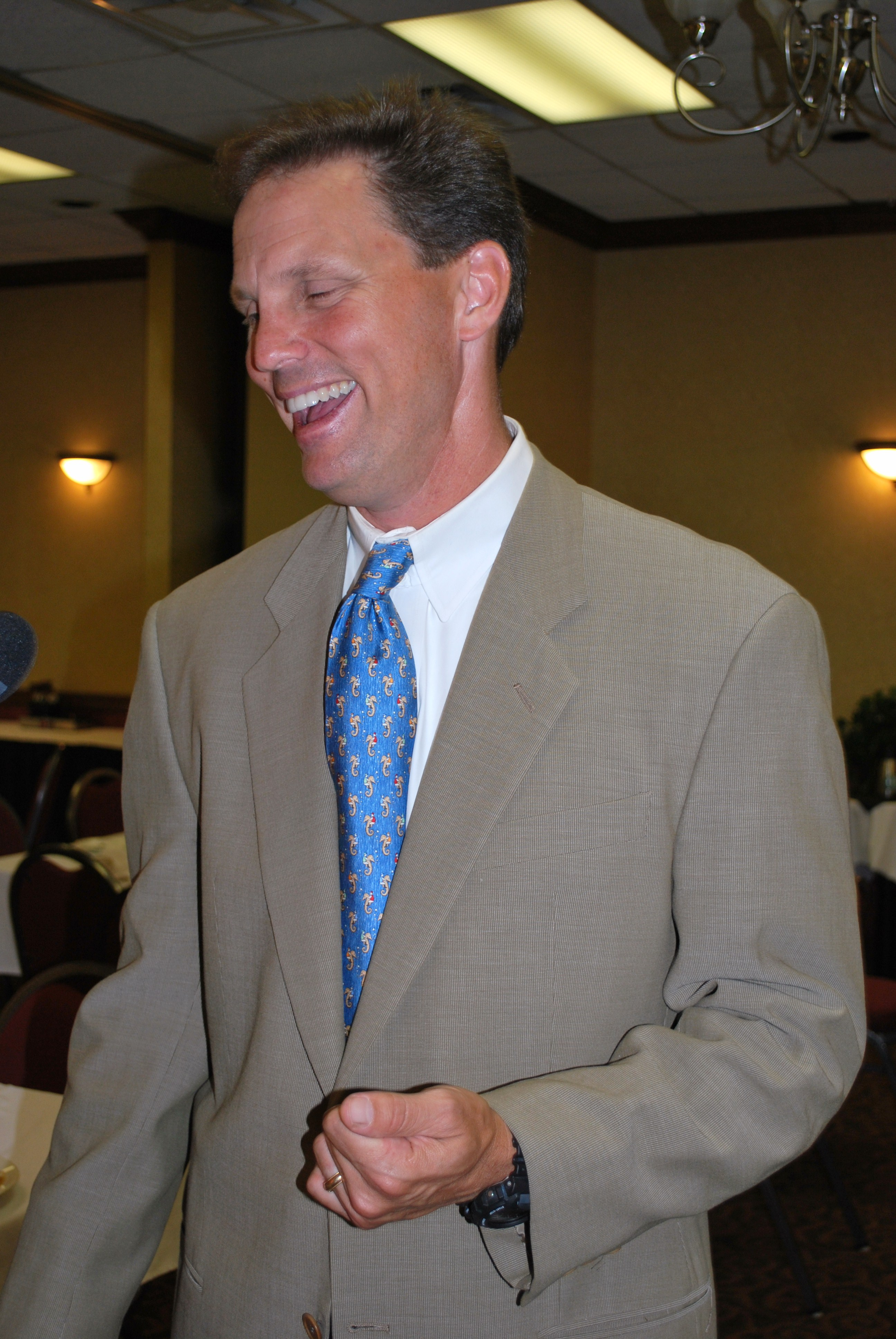
- Kelley in 2009

Houston Baptist Huskies
- Title: Offensive assistant coach

Personal information
- Listed height: 6 ft 1 in (1.85 m)
- Listed weight: 170 lb (77 kg)

Career information
- College: University of Texas at Austin

Career history
- Fairmont Falcons (2009–2010); California Vulcans (2010–2012); Houston Baptist Huskies (2012–2020)

Shannon Kelley is an American former football quarterback, coach and businessman. He was the starting quarterback of the Texas Longhorns at the beginning of 1988. After graduating, he married Olympian and popular American gymnast Mary Lou Retton and after pursuing a business career, went into college coaching. He last served as the assistant head football coach at Houston Christian University, before returning to the business world working for NETSYNC.

== High school ==
Kelley was a Class 5A All-State quarterback at Houston Memorial High School.

== Longhorn career ==
After seeing limited action in two games in 1985 and none in 1986, Kelley entered the 1987 season as the backup to Bret Stafford. Kelley first saw significant playing time in the second game of the season against BYU after Stafford went down with an injury. Down by 12 points at the time, he led them back to within five. The next week, in a blowout win over Oregon State, he came in during the third quarter and scored his first touchdown with an 18-yard touchdown run, but hurt his ankle. Later in the season, against Houston, Kelley would again replace an injured Stafford. Up at the time Stafford went down, the Longhorns blew a 14-point third-quarter lead and gave up 31 points in the fourth quarter to lose by 20. The next week, Kelley made his first career start, a 24–21 win over TCU, but Stafford returned and Kelley saw sparse action over the next two games. That season, the Longhorns went 6-5 and did not go to a bowl game.

Kelley entered the 1988 season as the unquestioned starter at quarterback; however, in games against the University of North Texas and University of Oklahoma, he was replaced by Mark Murdock. Murdock played solidly in those games and in a blowout win over New Mexico. In the game against Arkansas, Kelley was again pulled in favor of Murdock, who nearly led the team back from a 24–3 deficit. The Arkansas game would be his last start, as Murdock replaced him as the starter. The transition from Kelley to Murdock went smoothly, with no tension or harsh feelings between the two. "Shannon is a real classy guy. We got to be friends before the season and I know that this is hard for him to handle," Murdock said. Kelley finished with a record of 4-3 as a starter.

=== Records ===
- UT - Highest Completion Percentage, (min 70 attempts) (63.5%), season, surpassed by James Brown in 1994
- UT - Highest Completion Percentage, (min 100 attempts) (56.2%), career, surpassed by Richard Walton in 1988

== Marriage and professional career ==
Kelley began dating Mary Lou Retton, winner of the Olympic gold medal in the Gymnastic Individual All-around competition at the 1984 Summer Olympics in Los Angeles, while in college. They were engaged in 1989, shortly before he graduated, and married in 1990. They have four daughters. One of Shannon's daughters is McKenna Kelley, Level 10 gymnast who won the 2014 Nastia Liukin Cup. They divorced in February 2018 for undisclosed reasons.

After school, Kelley earned a master's degree in business administration from the University of St. Thomas in Houston and became a successful partner in an investment firm and real estate developer in Houston.

== Coaching career ==
Kelley decided to pursue his dream job as a college football coach and in 2009 was hired as the quarterbacks coach at Division II Fairmont State University in his wife's hometown of Fairmont, WV. He stayed for two seasons and then became the running backs coach at Division II California (PA) University for the 2011 season.

In 2012, he was hired as the assistant coach, primarily working with running backs, at Division I FCS Houston Baptist University for the Huskies' first season of collegiate football. He left the team in 2020 and became an account manager with NETSYNC.
