= Jack Halfpenny =

American football player (1926–2007)

No. 25
- Positions: QB, HB, LB, G

Personal information
- Born: March 4, 1926
- Died: April 1, 2007 (aged 81); Tyler, Texas, U.S.
- Listed height: 5 ft 10 in (1.78 m)
- Listed weight: 188 lb (85 kg)

Career information
- High school: Sunset
- College: Texas (1944–1948)

John Harper Halfpenny (March 4, 1926 – April 1, 2007) was an American college football player who started at quarterback, guard and halfback for the Longhorns football team from 1944 through 1948.

== College Football ==
Jack Halfpenny, the son of Robert F. Halfpenny of Dallas, was a star football player at Dallas Sunset High School where he played well enough to be named to the 1944 Texas High School Coach's Association All-Star game.

He played college football at the University of Texas where his athleticism allowed him to play an assortment of position, but always played linebacker on defense. In 1944 he played "blocking back", in front of Maxie Bell, but was better known for his play at linebacker.

In 1945, starting quarterback Bobby Layne was serving in the merchant marines and Halfpenny was tapped to replace him in the first half of the season. Halfpenny, splitting time with former Rice and Southwestern player Fred Brechtel, led Texas to 5 straight victories and a #9 ranking, but lost his final game as quarterback to Rice University 7-6 on a missed extra point attempt that cost the Longhorns a perfect season. The following week, Layne returned and became the starting quarterback again and Halfpenny moved back to halfback. At the end of the season, Halfpenny received all-conference Honorable Mention recognition as a back. The Longhorns won the Southwest Conference championship and later the 1946 Cotton Bowl.

In 1946 he returned to his dual role as blocking back and linebacker, though he missed a few games with injuries. Against Baylor that year, he blocked a punt late in the game that allowed Texas to seal their victory.

In 1947, new coach Blair Cherry took over and installed the T-formation, which did not use a blocking back. Because he was so strong on defense, Halfpenny was too good to be benched, but in the days of platoon football had to have an offensive position. Thus, Halfpenny moved from blocking back to guard on offense. He missed the first game of the season with an injured knee, but finished his career at the 1948 Sugar Bowl.

After graduation in 1948, he went to work for the Fidelity Union Life Insurance Co. in Austin. He was married to Carolyn Nunnallee in 1955, and had three children. He was later divorced and married Wilma Thompson Jones in 1968 until 1992 when Wilma Halfpenny died. In 1997 married Norma Mansfield. He died April 1, 2007, in Tyler, Texas.
