= Marvin Kristynik =

American football player and coach

No. 12
- Position: Quarterback

Personal information
- Listed height: 5 ft 10 in (1.78 m)
- Listed weight: 171 lb (78 kg)

Career information
- High school: Bay City High School

Awards and highlights
- National champion (1963)

Marvin Christopher Kristynik is an American former football player and coach who started as quarterback for the Texas Longhorns in the mid 1960s. He was the third-string quarterback on Texas' first national championship team in 1963, before becoming the starter the following two years. After graduating, he spent a decade as an assistant coach before leaving the profession as the offensive coordinator for the University of Texas at El Paso.

== Early life ==
Kristynik was a standout quarterback for Bay City High School who led his team to the AAA state playoffs.

Kristynik's older brother David had been the starting center at Texas from 1959–61, and his younger brother Paul played quarterback and defensive back for Texas from 1967 to 1969.

== Football career ==
=== Player ===
Recruited as a quarterback, Kristynik was quickly moved to wingback on the 1961 freshman team. He redshirted the 1962 season and then was moved back to quarterback.

As the third-string quarterback in 1963, Kristynik saw minimal play during Texas' first national championship season, getting into 6 games including the de facto National Championship game between #1 Texas and #2 Navy.

In 1964, Jim Hudson was expected to be the starting quarterback, but frequent injuries to Hudson's knee gave Kristynik the chance to take over. Kristynik started the first game of the season against Tulane and then replaced Hudson the following week when Hudson was injured on the Longhorn's first scoring play. Kristynik started for the rest of the season and led the team to within 1 play of repeating as national champions. Though was not much of a passer, Kristynik ran the option almost perfectly. By early October, the Longhorns had won 4 straight games and risen to #1 in both major polls, beating a #10 ranked Army along the way. But against #8 Arkansas they fell behind by 14 points before scoring two fourth-quarter touchdowns. Texas opted to play for the win, and on what would have been a game-winning 2 point conversion pass, Krystynik's pass was batted down, and Texas lost 14-13. Texas went on to win every other game that year, with Krystynik leading a 75-yard fourth quarter comeback drive against Baylor. In the 1965 Orange Bowl, the first ever bowl game played in prime time, Krystynik was replaced by Hudson early in the 2nd quarter when he failed to get the offence going and Hudson engineered a victory over National Champion and #1 Alabama and their quarterback Joe Namath.

In 1965, with Hudson graduated, Kristynik started every game in a disappointing 6-4 season. Texas started the season ranked #2 in the country and rose to #1 before dropping a road game to #3 Arkansas. The Longhorns then dropped 3 of their next 4 games to unranked opponents Rice, TCU and SMU. It would be 25 years before Texas again lost to Rice or TCU, and they've never lost to both of them in the same year since. When the season was over, Kristynik played his last game in the 1966 Hula Bowl backing up Tommy Wilson on the losing South team.

He finished with a record of 15-5 as a starting quarterback.

=== Coach ===
After graduation, Kristynik was hired as a coach of the Mississippi State freshman football team. The following year, he moved to the coaching staff at Tulane under former Longhorn assistant Jim Pittman, where he helped Tulane win the 1970 Liberty Bowl. He then followed Pittman to TCU from 1971-1973, staying on after Pittman's death on the sidelines, but leaving when Billy Tohill was fired. He moved on to the University of Texas at El Paso where he became the offensive coordinator and offensive backfield coach. In 1975, he left his position at UTEP to take a job with the Coaches Insurance Assn., of Rosenberg, Texas, saying that the only way he'd return to coaching would be for a head coaching job.

== Later life ==
In 1975, after leaving coaching, Kristynik founded a Richmond, TX based financial planning, insurance and brokerage company called Marvin Kristynik and Associates.
