= Mark Murdock (American football) =

American football player

No. 5 – Texas Longhorns
- Position: Quarterback
- Class: 1991

Personal information
- Born: Amarillo, Texas, U.S.
- Listed height: 6 ft 2 in (1.88 m)
- Listed weight: 192 lb (87 kg)

Career information
- High school: Westwood (TX)
- College: Texas (1988–1990)

Mark Murdock Jr. is an American former football quarterback. He was the starting quarterback for the Texas Longhorns from 1988 to 1989. He set several records for a freshman quarterback at Texas in 1988.

== High school ==
Murdock played football at Westwood High School in Austin. He led the team to an 8-2 record and was a top 30 recruit for the state of Texas in 1987 after throwing for 1,800 yards and 22 touchdowns.

== Longhorn career ==
After redshirting his freshman year in 1987, Murdock shared playing time with senior Shannon Kelley in 1988. He replaced Kelley in wins over New Mexico and North Texas early in the season. In the 6th game of the season, after replacing Kelley, Murdock rallied Texas from a 24-3 third quarter deficit throwing 2 touchdown passes to bring Texas to within striking range, but Arkansas held on to preserve a 27-24 win. Nonetheless, Murdock played well enough to earn the starting job for the rest of the season. In his first start against Texas Tech, Murdock threw for 326 yards and two touchdowns in a 33-32 loss. In the final game of the season against Texas A&M, Murdock again rallied the team from behind. Trailing 28-0 in the 2nd quarter, Murdock threw 3 touchdowns and led the team to within 4 points before time expired. Nonetheless, Murdock played well enough to set freshman records at Texas for single-season passing touchdowns, single game passing touchdowns and single-season passing yards and being named to The Sporting News Freshman All-American team.

In 1989, Murdock came into the season as a starter with a new offensive coordinator, Lynn Amadee. Texas started off the season against a difficult schedule. First, in Boulder against national title contender Colorado and then Penn State in Austin. After a 1-2 start, he was replaced by redshirt freshman Peter Gardere.

In 1990, he played in 4 games.

=== Records ===
- UT-Passing by a freshman, game (326), surpassed by Shea Morenz in 1993
- UT-Passing by a freshman, season (1,189), surpassed by Peter Gardere in 1989
- UT-Touchdown passes by a freshman, season (10), surpassed by Morenz in 1993
- UT-Longest pass play by a freshman (76 yards), broke own record, surpassed by Major Applewhite in 1998

== Life After Football ==
Murdock obtained his degree from the University of Texas in 1991. He is currently an investor in Houston. Murdock is married to the former Jenny Turner who was an individual and team SWC Champion golfer at The University of Texas and also played on the LPGA tour. Mark and Jenny have three children, Mark, Drew, and Turner.
