= Mike Cordaro =

American football player (born 1957)

No. 7, 5
- Positions: Quarterback, End, wide receiver

Personal information
- Born: 1957 (age 68–69)
- Listed height: 6 ft 3 in (1.91 m)
- Listed weight: 182 lb (83 kg)

Career information
- High school: San Antonio Highlands High School
- College: Texas (1976)

Awards and highlights
- 1978 Sun Bowl Champion

Mike Cordaro (born 1957) is an American former football player. He started as quarterback for the Texas Longhorns in 1976.

== Early life ==
Mike Cordaro played high school football at San Antonio Highlands High School. Though he would play quarterback in college, he didn't in high school where he was a kicker and played defensive back.

== College career ==
Mike Cordaro came to Texas in 1975 without being recruited by the school and walked on to the team. His only scholarship offers had been to play baseball and football at Angelo State or to play at the junior college level at Bee County or Ranger. In his freshman year he didn't even make the roster and was redshirted, but by the following season he'd become the starting quarterback.

Cordaro was originally placed on the defensive team of the scout team and he requested to be moved to the offensive team. During summer practices in 1975, secondary coach Timmy Doerr spotted him playing catch with other walk-ons and Head Coach Darrell Royal had him added as a quarterback. In the spring of 1976, he was battling Randy McEachern for the backup roll behind Ted Constanzo. He played surprisingly well in the spring finale and entered summer as the #2 quarterback. McEachern injured his knee in August and after an extremely close competition, Royal settled on Cordaro for the starting job over sophomore Constanzo who had started several games the previous year. He became the only walk on to ever start as quarterback for Royal, though he had been given a scholarship in the spring before he played.

The Longhorns entered the season as the favorite to win the Southwest Conference Championship. The team featured future Heisman Trophy winner Earl Campbell and Olympic gold medalist Lam Jones. But when Campbell pulled a hamstring in the opening game, and Texas was upset, the season started to slip away. Cordaro started the first seven games that season, including a 6-6 tie to #3 Oklahoma. But Royal lost confidence in him, pulling him in the first quarter against Texas Tech. The following week, Constanzo was named the starter, though Cordaro split playing time with him, in an embarrassing 30-0 loss to Houston. That led to both Cordaro and Constanzo being benched for the rest of the season in favor of true freshman Mark McBath. Cordaro would throw one more pass, incomplete, against TCU that season, and it would be the last time he'd play for Texas. He finished with a 3-2-1 record. It wound up being Darrell Royal's last season too.

In 1977, he skipped much of spring drills to try his hand at baseball and thus was never in contention for the starter's job the following season, so instead he redshirted. In 1978, under coach Fred Akers, he transitioned to offensive end and the next year to wide receiver, but after the 1976 season he never took the field again. In both seasons the team finished with a trip to the Sun Bowl, winning in 1978 and losing in 1979.

== Later life ==
Cordaro became a UPS division supervisor and retired to Phoenix, AZ.
