= Sam Ansley =

American football player

Profile
- Position: Quarterback
- Class: 1981

Personal information
- Listed height: 6 ft 1 in (1.85 m)
- Listed weight: 171 lb (78 kg)

Career information
- High school: Cypress-Fairbanks
- College: Texas (1977–1979)

Awards and highlights
- 1977 Southwest Conference Championship

Sam Ansley (born c. 1959) is an American former football player. He started two games as quarterback for the Texas Longhorns in 1977. When the 1977 season started he was the 4th string quarterback, but injuries to all three of the quarterbacks ahead of him led to him starting the two games at the end of the regular season. At the time Texas was undefeated, ranked #1 and playing for the national championship. They won both games.

== College career ==
Sam "Sammy" Ansley, had been a unanimous all-district quarterback in high school and had made the All-Greater Houston team in 1976. He was a freshman in 1977 when injuries to three other Texas quarterbacks led to him starting two games for the #1 Texas Longhorns to keep their national championship hopes alive.

=== Injury ===
Injuries to Ted Constanzo in the summer, followed by injuries to Mark McBath and Jon Aune in the Oklahoma game and to Randy McEachern in practice led to Ansley taking over as starter against TCU and the following week against Baylor. Up to that point he had only gotten into 3 games, throwing one pass and running the ball four times.

The other freshman quarterback, Sanford Coggins, had been moved to flanker in the summer meaning that in the TCU game his backups were sophomore defensive back Ricky Churchman, who had played quarterback in high school, and Constanzo who was only partly recovered from his surgery and still being held out for a medical redshirt.

Against TCU, Ansley and the Longhorns relied on eventual Heisman Trophy winner Earl Campbell to lead them to a 44-14 win. But Ansley ran for 1 touchdown and threw for two others, putting in an admirable debut. The following week, against Baylor, he led Texas to an early lead, scoring one touchdown, and then alternated series with a recovering McEachern and, in the fourth quarter, Costanzo, who used a whole year of eligibility to fill in as punter.

=== Recovery ===
McEachern recovered and reclaimed the starting position, and Ansley took a few snaps the next week against Texas A&M, but that would be the end of his playing career. After Ansley's 1978 redshirt season, he returned in the spring running second team behind Donnie Little. Ansley separated his shoulder in a spring scrimmage and ultimately had rotator cuff surgery after the 1979 season.

The following spring, a knee injury to McEachern had Ansley leading the Longhorn offense in practice. But McEachern recovered and Ansley was redshirted the next season. He never made the roster again. He finished with a 2-0 record as a starter.

== Later life ==
After graduating from Texas, he went into the oil and gas industry working for Clayton Williams Jr.; Sanchez O'Brien Oil and Gas; Coba Investments, Corp and Energy Marketing Services; and Lonestar Midstream, L.P.
