= Arnold L. Kirkpatrick =

American football player and coach (1886–1953)

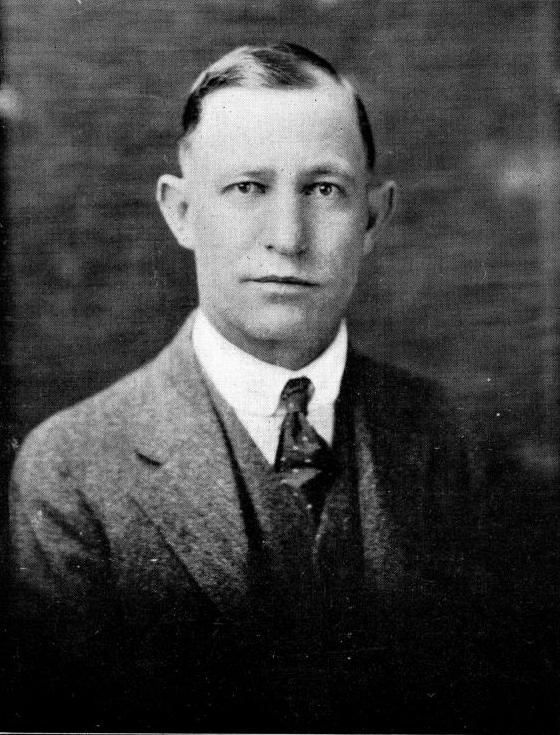
- Kirkpatrick pictured in The Lasso 1922, Howard Payne yearbook

Biographical details
- Born: December 23, 1886; Coleman County, Texas, U.S.
- Died: April 5, 1953 (aged 66); Brownwood, Texas, U.S.
- Education: The University of Texas at Austin

Playing career
- 1909–1911: Texas
- Positions: Halfback, quarterback

Coaching career (HC unless noted)
- 1915: Daniel Baker (assistant)
- 1917–1923: Howard Payne

Head coaching record
- Overall: 32–17–4

Accomplishments and honors

Awards

Arnold L. Kirkpatrick (December 23, 1886 – April 5, 1953) was an American football player and coach. He was the second head football coach at the Howard Payne University in Brownwood, Texas, serving for seven seasons, from 1917 to 1923, and compiling a record of 32–17–4. In 1922 he led the Yellow Jackets to an upset victory over Texas A&M, handing them their first ever defeat at Kyle Field.

Kirkpatrick first went to Howard Baker College, but he transferred to and played college football at the University of Texas at Austin as a halfback, quarterback, placekicker and punter from 1909 to 1911. He was captain of the team in 1910, was in 1911 elected to the All-State and All-southwestern teams and helped the Longhorns win the "State Championship". At the time of his death he was regarded as one of the greatest Longhorn backs of all time, and in 1958 he was inducted into the Longhorn Hall of Honor.

During World War I he enrolled in the Army and served from October–December 1918.

After leaving coaching, he worked as a lawyer in Brownwood, Texas. He died in at a hospital in Brownwood, on April 5, 1953, after suffering a heart attack.

== Head coaching record ==
Year	Team	Overall	Conference	Standing	Bowl/playoffs
Howard Payne Yellow Jackets (Texas Intercollegiate Athletic Association) (1917–1923)
1917	Howard Payne	5–2			
1918	Howard Payne	1–0–1			
1919	Howard Payne	6–3			
1920	Howard Payne	5–4			
1921	Howard Payne	5–3	4–1	2nd	
1922	Howard Payne	6–2–1	4–2–1	5th	
1923	Howard Payne	4–3–2	3–1–2	2nd	
Howard Payne:		32–17–4			
Total:		32–17–4			
