= Richard Walton (American football) =

American football player

No. 10
- Position: Quarterback

Personal information
- Listed height: 6 ft 5 in (1.96 m)
- Listed weight: 225 lb (102 kg)

Career information
- High school: Bay City

Awards and highlights
- Honors: 1996 First-Team Academic All-Big 12; 1997 First-Team Academic All-Big 12; 1998 First-Team Academic All-Big 12; Championships: 1995 Southwest Conference Champions; 1996 Big 12 Champions; Bowls: 1995 Sugar Bowl; 1997 Fiesta Bowl; 1998 Cotton Bowl

Richard Wade Walton is an American former football quarterback. He was the starting quarterback of the Texas Longhorns in early 1998. He was the backup quarterback for James Brown for three years before winning the starting job as a 5th year Senior. He started for the first two games in 1998 but broke his hand against UCLA and as a result lost his starting job to Major Applewhite.

== Longhorns career ==
Richard Walton was a coach's son, whose father Richard Lynn Walton had coached for Bay City High School where Richard played. He was the starting quarterback for Bay City for three years, earning All-American status as a senior.

His first start for Texas was a 21–13 win over Baylor in 1995 where he replaced an injured James Brown, a win that helped Texas win the last Southwest Conference championship. His second start, again in place of an injured James Brown, was in the 1997 UCLA game, which Texas lost 66-3 - the second worst loss in Texas history. He also saw considerable playing time in the 1996 Virginia game, 1996 Baylor game, 1997 Rutgers game and 1997 Colorado game, as Walton replaced an injured or struggling Brown.

After winning the starting job in both spring practice and pre-season in 1998, he won his first game as the team's unquestioned leader, beating New Mexico 66–36. But in the second game of the season against UCLA, he broke his hand and was replaced by redshirt Freshman Major Applewhite. He was statistically among the best quarterbacks in the country at the time. The injury was only supposed to keep him out for 4–6 weeks, but Applewhite played well enough to keep the job all season. Once he recovered from his injury, Walton saw only occasional play.

Walton, a 3.5 GPA student, graduated in 1998 with a degree in kinesiology and went to medical school at McGovern Medical School. He is currently a radiologist for M&S Radiology in San Antonio.

=== Records ===
- UT-Lowest Percentage of Passes Had Intercepted, season (1.6%) (50 attempts minimum), surpassed by Chance Mock in 2003
- UT-Lowest Percentage of Passes Had Intercepted, career (2.5%) (100 attempts minimum), surpassed by Chance Mock in 2004
- UT-Highest Completion Percentage, career (60.1%) (min 100 attempts), surpassed by Vince Young in 2005
