= Bobby Lackey =

American football player (1937–2021)

No. 22 – Texas Longhorns
- Positions: QB, P, DB, K, PR, KR

Personal information
- Born: October 14, 1937; Weslaco, Texas, U.S.
- Died: September 2, 2021 (aged 83); Weslaco, Texas, U.S.
- Listed height: 6 ft 3 in (1.91 m)
- Listed weight: 205 lb (93 kg)

Career information
- High school: Weslaco
- College: Texas (1958–1959)

Awards and highlights
- Back of the Week - Oct 12, 1958; Texas High School Hall of Fame inductee (2011); 1959 Co-Southwest Conference Championship

Bobby Lackey (October 14, 1937 – September 2, 2021) was an American football player who was the starting quarterback for the Texas Longhorns in the late 1950s. An all around athlete, he also played punter, kicker and defensive back and returned both punts and kick-offs. He was the team's top scorer in 1958 and 1959 and helped Texas to win a share of the 1959 Southwest Conference championship, the first of the Darrell Royal era. He was also the first Longhorn to ever appear on the cover of Sports Illustrated.

== Early life ==
Lackey was a standout athlete at Weslaco High School where he was an all-American in football, all-state in basketball, and all-district in baseball. He helped Weslaco make four straight playoff appearances, including a trip to the state semi-finals in 1955, and he was good enough at baseball to attract the attention of scouts. Nearly six decades later, he was described as "the greatest athlete in the past 100 years of the Valley."

== Football ==
Lackey redshirted his freshman season, but in 1957 he alternated with starter Walter Fondren at quarterback, and also contributed to the varsity team as a defensive back and kicker. The team, coming off a 1-9 season, posted a record of 6-3-1, beating #11 Rice, #17 TCU and Bear Bryant's #4 Texas A&M, while dropping games to South Carolina, #1 Oklahoma and SMU. Lackey led the team in interceptions that year and at season's end, scored all the points including the winning field goal to beat Texas A&M, 9–7. The team went to the Sugar Bowl where it was handled easily by #7 Mississippi. Lackey kicked the team's one PAT and threw both of the team's completed passes.

As the starting quarterback in 1958, Lackey led Texas to a #4 ranking after winning the first five games including a win over #2 Oklahoma - its first win over a team ranked that high since 1941. Lackey beat Oklahoma in every facet of the game. He recovered a fumbled punt on the 1-yard line to prevent an OU touchdown, set up the team's first touchdown with a 37-yard pass, threw the game-tying touchdown, kicked the winning point after, made an open field tackle of Bobby Boyd to preserve the lead and then, with a 1-point lead and Oklahoma threatening, he made a one-handed interception to seal Darrell Royal's first win over the Sooners. However, after the fast start, the Longhorns dropped 3 of their last 5 and missed out on a bowl game.

In 1959, Lackey quarterbacked a Texas squad that would win a share of the Southwest Conference Championship and compete for the national championship. After climbing as high as #2 in the rankings, their highest ranking since 1941, before being upset by #18 TCU, Texas finished the season ranked #4 in the country. During the final regular season game against Texas A&M, Lackey led the Longhorns on a game-winning 90 yard touchdown drive. Lackey was featured on the cover of Sports Illustrated in 1959, walking up the tunnel at the Cotton Bowl after a win over Oklahoma with future wife Judy. He shared the 1959 lead for rushing touchdowns in the southwest conference with Don Meredith and 3 others.

The Longhorns went to the 1960 Cotton Bowl where they faced off against #1 ranked, and National Champion Syracuse. There Lackey threw what was, at the time, the 2nd longest touchdown pass in Cotton Bowl history, a 69 yarder to Jack Collins. The only longer Cotton Bowl touchdown pass at the time was an 87-yard pass thrown two quarters earlier to Heisman Trophy winner Ernie Davis in the same game. The Longhorns lost that game 23-14.

=== Records ===
- UT - Longest pass play in a bowl game, (69 yards) - Surpassed by Jim Hudson in 1965

== Later life ==
One week after signing an $11,000 free agent contract with the Pittsburgh Steelers in 1960, and again after being wooed back, he walked away from pro football in favor of a career in agribusiness. He went to work for his father-in-law at the J. S. McManus Produce Company for a year and then owned his own produce company, Rio Grande City Produce for two years. He returned to McManus as a part owner and Assistant General Manager in 1965 and then General Manager in 1969. He also owned Lackey-Fisher Chevrolet in Raymondsville starting in 1977. In 2001, after struggles in the produce industry led to the death of his company, he retired.

He served on the Weslaco City Council from 1964–69 and the school board from 1968-1974. He was active in many civic and business organizations and was named Weslaco's Man of the Year in 1972. In 2004, he moved to Spring, Texas to be near his daughters.

Over the years, he received several acknowledgments for his sports accomplishments. In 1977, he was inducted into the Longhorn Hall of Honor and in 1990 to the Rio Grande Valley Sports Hall of Fame. In 2002, the football stadium for Weslaco High School was renamed Bobby Lackey Stadium in his honor, joining the previous honor of having a gymnasium in his name three decades prior. In 2011, he was inducted into the Texas High School Sports Hall of Fame.

The 2008 Ernie Davis biopic, The Express: The Ernie Davis Story, includes a dramatization of the 1960 Cotton Bowl, in which Lackey was played by actor Jeff Welsh.
