= Rob Moerschell =

American football player (born 1962)

Robert Marvin Moerschell
No. 8 – University of Texas at Austin
- Positions: QB, TB, PR

Personal information
- Born: November 18, 1962 (age 63); Dallas, Texas, U.S.
- Listed height: 6 ft 0 in (1.83 m)
- Listed weight: 183 lb (83 kg)

Career information
- High school: Highland Park High School

Awards and highlights
- Championships: 1981 Southwest Conference Championship; 1983 Southwest Conference Championship; Bowls: 1982 Cotton Bowl; 1982 Sun Bowl; 1984 Cotton Bowl; 1984 Freedom Bowl

Robert Marvin Moerschell (born November 18, 1962) is an American former football player. He started as quarterback for the Texas Longhorns for most of the 1983 season, the last undefeated regular season for Texas in the 20th century. In 1984, he moved to tailback and punt returner when Todd Dodge took over as quarterback. He also returned punts and kickoffs in 1981 and 1982. Moerschell is the last Texas quarterback to go undefeated as a starter over his entire career and one of the school's top ten punt returners of all time.

== Early life ==
As a high school football player Rob Moerschell started out backing up future SMU star Lance McIlhenry, whom he would later start against and beat at Texas. In 1981, Moerschell led Highland Park High School into the playoffs after a perfect regular season with his only loss as starting quarterback at either the high school or college level coming in the high school state semifinals. After the season, he led the Texas team of high school all-stars to victory in the 1981 Oil Bowl game against Oklahoma, earning the game's MVP honors. He was all-district and the offensive player of the year at the district, greater Dallas and North Texas levels. He was also an all-district baseball player. Despite his success, he was only recruited by a couple of major schools due to concern about his lack of height.

== College career ==
Moerschell started his career at Texas as a backup quarterback but, because he was a good runner, he saw special teams playing time in both his freshman and sophomore seasons as a punt return and kickoff return specialist. He was the team's leading punt returner both seasons and had a career long 30 yard kickoff return in the 1982 game against Utah. He struggled to make it as a quarterback because he wasn't as strong a passer as other quarterbacks on the roster.

In 1983, he was set to be the backup quarterback again, but starter Todd Dodge suffered a shoulder injury in scrimmage shortly before the season opener, giving Moerschell the start against Auburn. He split time with former starting quarterback Rick McIvor, but Moerschell shone, proving he could run the option and throw the ball, and would spend the rest of the season trading the starting job with Dodge and McIvor. Moerschell started the next 6 games. He led Texas to a come-from-behind win over North Texas and an impressive victory over #7 Oklahoma, however poor performances against #8 SMU and Texas Tech, in which Dodge came in off the bench to win the game, gave the team back to Dodge. Moerschell regained the starting position three games later, after Dodge struggled against Houston and TCU. Moerschell started the next two games against Baylor and Texas A&M, but in the second game, after Texas fell behind 13-0, he was replaced by Rick McIvor who led the team to score 45 unanswered points and gained the starting position, even though Moerschell provided key support in that game. McIvor quarterbacked the Longhorns in the Cotton Bowl that year, when a win would have likely secured them a National Championship, but a muffed punt return gave Georgia the opportunity it needed to score the game-winning touchdown. In that game, Moerschell came in on a few plays to run the option.

In his senior year, Moerschell was featured on the cover of Athlon's 1984 Annual Southwest Football preview, however he would not play much that season. Injuries at tailback and the emergence of Dodge as the starter, led to Moerschell being moved to tailback - a position he had played as a high school freshman - weeks before the season opener. He also was the team's punt returner. Later in the season, Coach Fred Akers did consider moving him back to quarterback when Dodge was injured in the Rice game. In the tie against #3 Oklahoma he played a key role, controlling a high snap on the last play of the game and made the placement for Ward's game-saving kick. He played in every game, but had fewer touches at the end of the season.

Moerschell finished his college career with a perfect 9-0 record as starting quarterback, the last Texas quarterback with a perfect career record. He also graduated as one of the top career punt returners in Texas history.

== Personal life ==
Moerschell introduced his sister Laura to former Longhorn quarterback Robert Brewer whom Moerschell had backed up in 1982, and the two were later married.
