= Mark McBath =

American football player (born 1957)

James Mark McBath
No. 17
- Position: Quarterback

Personal information
- Born: November 18, 1957 (age 68); Fort Smith, Arkansas, U.S.
- Listed height: 5 ft 11 in (1.80 m)
- Listed weight: 188 lb (85 kg)

Career information
- High school: Richard King High School

Awards and highlights
- Championships: 1977 Southwest Conference Championship; Bowls: 1978 Sun Bowl

James Mark McBath (born November 18, 1957) is an American former football player who started as quarterback for the Texas Longhorns in the late 1970s. He was the starting quarterback in Darrell Royal's last game.

== Early life ==
Mark McBath was a highly recruited high school quarterback who played at Richard King High School in Corpus Christi. He was All City once and All District and All South Texas two years in a row. He also made the All District team as a center fielder for the baseball team.

== College career ==
McBath's career at Texas was marked by an early rise, an unfortunate injury, a spectacular finish and a surprising early departure.

McBath arrived at the University of Texas in 1976 as the back-up to Randy McEachern, Ted Constanzo and Mike Cordaro and was competing with fellow freshman Jon Aune for the fourth-string role. But an injury to McEachern in August, and inconsistent play by Constanzo and Cordaro, led Darrell Royal to put McBath in as starter as a true freshman. He started four games that season, going 2–2, including a loss to number 11 Texas A&M and a victory over Arkansas after Coach Royal announced that it would be his last game as Texas' head coach.

McBath started the 1977 season as the starting quarterback and led Texas to three consecutive wins and the number 4 ranking, while sharing playing time with Jon Aune. But his season was sidelined when he broke his ankle on the seventh play of the Oklahoma game. He was diagnosed with a loose ankle ligament and placed in a cast for over two months. He was out for the rest of the season while Texas went undefeated and played in the Cotton Bowl for the national championship.

The following spring, McBath was unable to go full speed in drills because of his recovering ankle. As a result, McEachern was named the starter one week prior to the season opener, with McBath relegated to the third string. McEachern and Donnie Little took most of the snaps that season, with McBath getting mop-up duty against Rice and TCU, until Texas was upset by unranked Baylor late in the season. In that game, McBath got a larger portion of the playing time and threw three interceptions. For reasons that Akers never stated, McBath was given the start the next week, in the final regular-season game against Texas A&M. He led number 14 Texas to a 22–7 victory and was named the Chevrolet Offensive Player of the Game. He was given the start again in the Sun Bowl game against Maryland and they won in a 42–0 rush-dominated blowout.

Even though he was projected to be the starter the next season, and had said that late in the season that he was definitely coming back in 1979, McBath quit football a month after quarterbacking the Longhorns in their Sun Bowl win. He left with a year of eligibility remaining so that he could focus on getting his grades up to medical school standards. He figured he had no chance in the NFL, and saw football getting in the way of his dream of going to medical school. He finished his career with 9 victories and 2 losses as a starter.

== Later life ==
McBath graduated from Texas with a degree in biology and went to medical school in Houston, Texas. He spent five years as a surgical resident at Hermann Hospital and then held a teaching fellowship in surgical oncology at M.D. Anderson Cancer Center and Tumor Institute. He later left to enter his own practice in Houston.

Dr. McBath is a board certified general surgeon and fellowship-trained surgical oncologist. In his practice, he performs a wide range of surgical procedures, including cancer operations, with vast experience in treating breast cancer. He was published in the 2005 edition of Texas Super Doctors, a publication that selects doctors according to outstanding achievements.
