= Donnie Little =

American football player (born 1959)

No. 1
- Positions: Quarterback, wide receiver, punt returner, kick returner

Personal information
- Born: October 14, 1959 (age 67); Dickinson, Texas, U.S.
- Listed height: 6 ft 1 in (1.85 m)
- Listed weight: 196 lb (89 kg)

Career information
- High school: Dickinson (TX)
- College: Texas

Career history
- 1982–83: Ottawa Rough Riders

Awards and highlights
- Texas High School Football Hall of Fame (2013)

Career CFL statistics
- Receptions: 46
- Rec. Yds: 753
- Long Rec.: 36 yards
- Rec. TDs: 1
- Punt Ret: 26
- Ret Yds: 211

Donnie Little (born October 14, 1959) is an American former football quarterback. He was the quarterback of the Texas Longhorns from 1978 to 1980, and in 1978 was the first black quarterback to play for The University of Texas. He is credited with "opening doors" for future black quarterbacks at Texas, such as James Brown and Vince Young.

== Early life ==
Little was born in Dickinson, Texas and graduated from Dickinson High School in 1978. He started playing high school football during his junior year when the football coach encouraged black students to play football. Little helped the team make it to the state playoffs in 1976, and in 1977 Dickinson won the Class 3A Football State Championship with Little as quarterback. In the state championship game against the Brownwood Lions, Little set the Texas record for most rushing yards (255) in a state championship game. Only one year later, Eric Dickerson broke this record while playing at Sealy High School.

He was also a shortstop-pitcher in high school who hit better than .400 his senior year and threw two no-hitters.

== Longhorns career ==
After being heavily recruited and choosing Texas over Oklahoma, Little played for The University of Texas from 1978 to 1981, becoming the first black quarterback to play for UT. He had wanted to play baseball too, but felt pressured by Coach Fred Akers to focus on football.

In his freshman season, he shared quarterback duties with Randy McEachern and Mark McBath, with McEachern starting most games. Little replaced McEachern in the second quarter of the Oklahoma game, and despite four turnovers in that game, he earned his first career start the following week against North Texas State. But when Little fumbled three times in the first half, and Texas fell behind 9–0, McEachern came off the bench to rally the Longhorns for the win, reclaiming the starting job. Little continued to share quarterback duties as the backup to McEachern until a thumb injury suffered during the Baylor game ended Little's season.

For his sophomore season in 1979, Donnie Little became the team's primary quarterback. He started all of the first nine games, going 8-1 and leading Texas to a #6 ranking, and as high as #2 at one point. He missed the second half of the Rice game with a thumb injury, and had to split time with backup Rick McIvor against Texas Tech. Two weeks later, he was injured again – this time with two sprained ankles and replaced by McIvor. His injury kept him out for the rest of the season and with McIvor as quarterback the Longhorns went 1–2 at the end of the season.

In 1980, Little was again the primary quarterback at the beginning of the season, but again would be injured by the end. The season started well as he set the school record for most passing yards in a game, with 306, versus Rice and reeled off five straight wins, including one over #12 Oklahoma to climb to #2 in the rankings. But then Texas suffered back-to-back losses to unranked teams, first at home to SMU and then on the road to Texas Tech. Little was benched in each of those games in favor of backup Rick McIvor who nearly rallied Texas to a comeback in the Texas Tech game. As a result, McIvor won the starting job for the Houston game. Texas won that game, but McIvor was injured, giving the starting job back to Little. He had a standout game against TCU, completing 12 passes in a row in one span and winding up with 334 yards in total offense and two touchdowns in a 51–26 blowout, but then threw for only 7 yards with 2 interception in a 16–0 loss to Baylor and he was again benched. The following week against Texas A&M, Little got the Longhorns to an early lead, but left the game with an injury that, for the third year in a row, ended his season before the bowl game. The Texas A&M game would be his last as a Texas quarterback and the last time he'd throw the ball in college.

In the spring of 1981, Little moved to wide receiver because he knew that "his future as a pro, if any, wasn't at quarterback and he wanted to showcase his talents elsewhere." He was the Longhorn's leading receiver that season and second best punt returner, finishing 3rd best in total offense. In his first game against Rice, he caught a career long 65-yard touchdown pass. He caught a game winning 45-yard touchdown pass in the 4th quarter against #14 Miami and scored the team's only touchdown in a loss to Arkansas. His best game as a receiver came against #3 Alabama in the Cotton Bowl – the only bowl game he was ever healthy enough to play in. He produced 105 yards of total offense with more receiving yards than all the other Texas receivers combined and tied the Cotton Bowl record for most receptions.

Over his career, he played in 29 games and led the team in total offenses in 1979 and 1980. He passed for 2,067 yards, had 338 yards receiving and rushed for 1,334 in his career at UT. His record as a starting quarterback was 15-5 and he is listed as one of the All-Time Top 10 Longhorn Quarterbacks by 247 Sports in 2013.

=== Records ===
- UT – Passing yards, game (306), surpassed by Todd Dodge in 1985
- UT – Total offense, game (392), surpassed by Major Applewhite in 1998
- UT – Most 300 yard total offense games, season (2), tied by James Brown in 1994, 1995, 1996 and 1997, tied by Ricky Williams in 1998, surpassed by Major Applewhite in 1999
- UT – Most 300 yard total offense games, career (2), tied by Bret Stafford in 1987, surpassed by Brown in 1995
- UT – Lowest percentage of passes intercepted (minimum 300 passes), career (5.6%), surpassed by Bret Stafford in 1987
- Cotton Bowl – Receptions, game (5), tied Tom Gatewood, surpassed by Gerard Phelan in 1985

== After college ==
Surprising many, Little was not selected in the NFL draft, Little was signed as a free agent by the Atlanta Falcons, but cut before the season started. Little then played for the CFL's Ottawa Rough Riders where he was a wide receiver, quarterback, punt returner and kickoff returner. He played with former Oklahoma quarterback and future congressman J.C. Watts. "There was a time that Donnie Little was probably the best athlete we had on the team," said Gordon Bunke, Ottawa's director of communications. But during his second season in 1983, he suffered a severe knee injury that tore both ligaments, ending his career.

In 1986, he tried to start a career playing pro baseball. That year, he played semi-pro baseball for the Austin Collegiates while finishing his degree in communications. Little ended his professional sports career and took a job with the University of Texas, where he spent 24 years as a fundraiser for the Longhorn Foundation. He is now an athletic director in Tyler, TX.

== Awards ==
He was inducted into the Texas High School Football Hall of Fame in May 2013.
