= Bret Stafford =

American football player (born 1964)

Bret Alan Stafford
No. 10 – Texas Longhorns
- Position: Quarterback
- Class: 1988

Personal information
- Born: December 15, 1964; Amarillo, Texas, U.S.
- Listed height: 6 ft 0 in (1.83 m)
- Listed weight: 186 lb (84 kg)

Career information
- High school: Belton and Temple
- College: Texas (1983–1987)

Awards and highlights
- Texas High School Football Hall of Fame (2007)

Bret Alan Stafford (born December 15, 1964) is an American former college football player. He started as quarterback for the Texas Longhorns for almost 2½ seasons, 1985-87 during which time he established 14 UT records, among them most passing yards in a season (2,233) in 1986, and most passing yards over a career (4,735). However, most of his records have since been surpassed by Peter Gardere, James Brown, Major Applewhite, and Vince Young.

== Early life ==
Bret Stafford was a talented athlete who spent his life surrounded by sports. A native of Amarillo, Texas, Stafford's family moved to Temple in 1972, where his father, Dick Stafford, a former Texas Tech football player, served as offensive coordinator to Bob McQueen at Temple High School and his mother was a Middle School girl's coach. Bret Stafford had an immediate impact on the Wildcats varsity, starting as a freshman, never losing a district title game, and playing on a team that won the state title in 1979. That team starred QB Robbie Harris and future NFL running back Kenneth Davis. At Temple, he was all-district in 1980 and 1981 and All-Central Texas as a quarterback. He was also all-district and all-central Texas in baseball and he made it to the 4A state championship race in the 300-meter hurdles, finishing 6th one year and winning in 1982.

However, after Dick Stafford accepted the head coach job at Belton in the spring of 1982, Bret Stafford left Temple, too. At Belton, he was again an all-district QB, and also made the all-state team and was a Parade All-American. He again ran track, winning the state championship in the 300-meter hurdles with the 5th fastest time in the nation by a high school athlete in that event that year and earning All-American honors. He also made the all-district baseball team again for two years as a center fielder. Because of his abilities, he was picked by one recruiting magazine as the state's all-around best athlete in 1983.

In 1983, he played free safety in the Texas High-School All-Star game.

In 2007, Stafford was inducted into the Texas High School Football Hall of Fame.

== College career ==
Highly recruited for football and scouted by major league teams in baseball, Stafford accepted a scholarship offer by the University of Texas, turning down offers from Texas A&M and Texas Tech.

After redshirting the 1983 season, Stafford was a back-up to Todd Dodge in 1984, a season when the Longhorns spent two weeks ranked #1. Stafford went in to replace Dodge in two games that season, after Dodge threw a school record 5th interception against Houston, and in the second half of a loss to Texas A&M.

In the spring of 1985, Stafford struggled so much at quarterbacking that the coaching staff considered moving him to defensive back, but by the summer, Dodge and Stafford were in the middle of a heated quarterback battle that Stafford would eventually win. Stafford got his first career start against Missouri, though he and Dodge shared snaps. Stafford started every game that season, but Dodge played often, sometimes more than Stafford. Against Oklahoma Stafford only lasted 6 plays before being pulled for Dodge. When Dodge failed to impress, Stafford started again the next week, and led the Longhorns to an upset of #4 Arkansas. With him at quarterback, the Longhorns had an 8-4 record and went to the 1985 Bluebonnet Bowl where they lost to #11 Air Force.

In 1986, Stafford entered as the undisputed starter of a team that was unranked all year. The Longhorns struggled to a 5-6 record and missed out on a bowl game. Stafford threw for 2256 yards, with 15 interceptions and 12 touchdowns. Following the season, head coach Fred Akers was fired and replaced with David McWilliams. In the spring, Stafford had elbow surgery.

In his senior season, Stafford was again the starter - and a near unanimous pre-season pick for all-SWC, but after being injured in the game against BYU and again against Houston, he shared significant playing time with Shannon Kelley, who would start against TCU. The Longhorns went 6-5, including an upset win over #15 Arkansas and losses to both #1 Oklahoma and #5 Auburn. Stafford suffered a concussion and a broken tooth when he was hit out-of-bounds in the BYU game, and had to sit out the rest of the game. He almost had to have his jaw wired shut as a result. The Arkansas game was won on an 18-yard touchdown pass from Bret Stafford to WR Tony Jones on the last play of the game, the first time in Longhorn history that a game was won on the last play of the game. Stafford was award SWC Co-Offensive Player of the Week.

After injuring himself in an attempt to prevent an interception from being returned for a touchdown, Stafford left the Houston game with the Longhorns up 24-20, but they fell apart without him losing 60-40. He then sat out the TCU game the next week. Nonetheless, Texas entered the final week with a chance to win the Southwest Conference Championship, but they lost to Texas A&M on a late touchdown. The team went to the 1987 Astro-Bluebonnet Bowl where Stafford led the Longhorns to a 32-27 win over Pittsburgh in his last game and the last ever Bluebonnet Bowl. He threw for 368 yards and three touchdowns with 1 interception.

Stafford graduated with 16 Longhorn records, and was the school's the all-time leader in passing yards. His record as a starter was 19-15.

=== Records ===
- UT - Longest run by a quarterback (74 yards), surpassed by Vince Young
- UT - Fastest to 1,000 yards in a single season (5 games) tied by Peter Gardere in 1992 and Shea Morenz in 1994, surpassed by James Brown in 1995
- UT - Highest Completion Percentage (min 100 attempts) (55.6%), season, surpassed by Gardere in 1989
- UT - 300 yard total offense games, career (2), tied Donnie Little, surpassed by Brown in 1995
- UT - Pass attempts, Game (42), broke his own record, tied by Morenz in 1993 and then broken by him in the same year
- UT - Pass attempts, Season (224), surpassed by Gardere in 1990
- UT - Pass attempts, career (718), surpassed by Gardere in 1992
- UT - Pass completions, Game (20), on three occasions, tied by Gardere in 1990 and again in 1991, surpassed by Gardere in 1992
- UT - Pass completions, Season (120), surpassed by Gardere in 1990
- UT - Pass completions, Career (378), surpassed by Gardere in 1991
- UT - Lowest percentage of passes intercepted (minimum 300 passes), career (4.9%), surpassed by Gardere in 1992
- **UT - Passes intercepted, Game (5) tied with Zeke Martin, Todd Dodge, Garrett Gilbert**
- UT - Passing Yards, Bowl game (368), 1987 Bluebonnet Bowl, surpassed by Major Applewhite in 2001
- UT - Passing Yards, Season (2,233), surpassed by Gardere in 1992
- UT - Passing Yards, Career (4,735), surpassed by Gardere in 1992
- UT - Total Offense, Season (2,472), surpassed By Brown in 1996
- UT - Total Offense, Career (5,379), surpassed by Gardere in 1992
- UT - Quarterback starts, career (34), tied Bobby Layne and Marty Akins, surpassed by Peter Gardere in 1992

Bold means active

== Later life ==
After graduating in 1988, Stafford briefly considered trying to make the NFL as a safety, before ending his football career and going into private business. He opened a flooring business in Temple and lived in Belton. He tried for some time to make it as a professional fisherman on the BASS masters tour.
