= Shea Morenz =

American football player (born 1974)

No. 12
- Position: Quarterback

Personal information
- Born: January 22, 1974 (age 52); Denville, New Jersey, U.S.
- Listed height: 6 ft 2 in (1.88 m)
- Listed weight: 205 lb (93 kg)

Career information
- High school: Central (San Angelo, Texas)
- College: Texas Longhorns (1992–1994)

Awards and highlights
- Academic All-Southwest Conference (1994); Southwest Conference co-champion (1994); Season and game, Texas record, most attempts by a freshman

Other information
- Baseball career
- Outfielder
- Batted: Left Threw: Right

Professional debut
- New York–Penn League (Class A Short Season): 1995, for the Oneonta Yankees
- Pacific Coast League (Class AAA): 1998, for the Las Vegas Stars

Last Southern League (Class AA) appearance
- 1999, for the Mobile BayBears
- Stats at Baseball Reference

Former teams
- Oneonta Yankees (1995); Greensboro Bats (1996); Tampa Yankees (1997); Norwich Navigators (1998); Las Vegas Stars (1998); AZL Padres (1999); Mobile BayBears (1999)

Career highlights and awards
- 2× first-team All-Southwest Conference (1994–1995); All-Southwest Conference tournament team (1994); Southwest Conference tournament champion (1994)

Shea Brian Morenz (born January 22, 1974) is an American businessman, strategist, philanthropist, and the CEO and president of Morenz Group and Bobcat Group. Morenz played collegiate football and baseball at the University of Texas before being drafted by the New York Yankees organization in the first round of the 1995 Major League Baseball draft.

== Early life and education ==
Shea attended San Angelo Central High, where he excelled in academics and athletics and was named a first-team High School All-American in both football and baseball. Morenz was the 1992 Texas Player of the Year in both football and baseball and played in two Texas High School Coaches All-Star Games (football and baseball). He was inducted into the Bobcat Athletics Hall of Fame in 2010.

Upon graduation, Shea went on to attend the University of Texas on an athletics scholarship, where he started two years as quarterback for the Texas Longhorns, was first-team All-Southwest Conference as a right fielder for the UT baseball team and was selected in the first round of the 1995 Major League Baseball draft by the New York Yankees. He graduated with a bachelor's degree in finance and made the All-Southwest Conference Academic Honors list.

== Career ==
Morenz was drafted with the 27th pick in the first round of the 1995 Major League Baseball draft by the New York Yankees organization. He played four seasons with the organization. Moranz was traded to the San Diego Padres in August 1998 in a deal alongside Ray Ricken for Jim Bruske and Brad Kaufman. He played one season in the San Diego Padres system before retiring from professional baseball in 2000.

Following his baseball career, Morenz got his Master of Business Administration at the University of Michigan and began working at Goldman Sachs in 2001. Morenz spent 10 years at the company and became a managing director in the investment management division and region head for private wealth management for the southwest region during his time there.

In 2011, Morenz joined Stratfor, a geopolitical intelligence firm, where he served as president and CEO before starting his own company.

Shea founded Morenz Group, a Houston-based holding company, in 2016, where he currently serves as president and CEO.

In 2017, Morenz Group launched their first operating platform, Bobcat Group, a privately-held land, midstream and mineral rights company operating in the Midland Basin.

== Philanthropy ==
Morenz is involved with a number of community organizations, including the Texas Business Leadership Council, the Board of Visitors for the Menninger Clinic, and the Navy Seal Foundation. He also serves on the Chancellor's Council and Development Board for the University of Texas System as well as the Advisory Council for the McCombs School of Business. Morenz is the founder of the University of Texas 1883 Council, as well as a member of Young Presidents’ Organization, Austin Chapter.
