= Chance Mock =

American football player (born 1981)

No. 5
- Position: Quarterback

Personal information
- Born: December 10, 1981 (age 44); Lubbock, Texas, U.S.
- Listed height: 6 ft 3 in (1.91 m)
- Listed weight: 235 lb (107 kg)

Career information
- High school: The Woodlands (TX)
- College: Texas (2000–2004)
- NFL draft: 2005: undrafted

Career history
- Austin Wranglers (2006)

Career AFL statistics
- Completions-Attempts: 4-7
- Passing Yards: 33
- TD-INT: 1-0
- Rushing Yards: 12
- Rushing Tds: 4
- Stats at ArenaFan.com

Chance Mock (born December 10, 1981) is an American former football quarterback who played college football for the University of Texas and played professionally for the Austin Wranglers in the Arena Football League. Mock was an announcer for the Wranglers, before they folded in 2008. As a Longhorn, he threw for over 1,500 yards with only 2 interceptions and still holds the record for lowest interception ratio in a season.

== Early life ==
Chance Mock attended The Woodlands High School in Houston, Texas, where he was a Parade All-American in 2000. Mock ranked number 9 on the Austin American-Statesman's College Football Recruiting Fab 55 for 2000, committing to The University of Texas at Austin that year.

== College career ==
Mock redshirted his first year and then was a backup quarterback for two years behind Chris Simms and Major Applewhite and during that time threw only eight passes. He entered spring practice in a battle for the starting job with redshirt freshman Vince Young, but after a spectacular spring game was named the starter.

He started the first 6 games of the 2003 season, leading the Longhorns to a 4–2 record. That included a loss, at home, against unranked Arkansas in which Mock played arguably his best game, throwing for 264 yards and 3 touchdowns with no interceptions and one fumble, but it was not enough to overcome errors on special team and poor defensive play. In the win over #16 Kansas State, Mock played well in the first half, but was ineffective in the second, and Young led Texas to score 10 points on his two drives, including scoring the game-winning touchdown. Against #1 Oklahoma the following week, Mock was named the starter late, but Young came in on the second drive and saw the majority of play. Following that loss, Young took over as the starter, primarily because coaches felt that the poor play of the offensive line necessitated a more mobile quarterback. He alternated time with Young after that, providing a very accurate classic drop-back threat to complement Vince Young's scrambling abilities. With Young under center, Texas reeled off 6 straight wins including dominating victories over #9 Nebraska, #21 Oklahoma State and on the road against Texas A&M. Mock played little in most of those games, but against Texas Tech, when the offense sputtered in the 4th quarter, he came off the bench with two minutes left to engineer an 86-yard game-winning touchdown drive. After #5 Texas was denied a BCS game due to a controversial rule limiting each conference to only two BCS berths, they found themselves instead in the Holiday Bowl against #13 Washington State. Young played a below par game, and Texas found themselves behind 20–10 in the third quarter when Mock, who had set up three of Texas' points on one of his two series in the first half, took over. He rallied the Longhorns to within one score and had them on Washington State's 11 yard line, when a blitz and sack turned into a fumble and Texas came up short.

Mock was the subject of much speculation during the 2003 season and 2004 off-season as to whether he would transfer from Texas to a 1-AA school to get more snaps and have a better chance of attracting the attention of the NFL. However, he decided to stay at Texas for the 2004 season. In 2004, he got very limited playing time, getting on the field in only 6 games. The only game in which he was a factor was the Missouri game, where he replaced an injured Young late in the second quarter, and played well enough to hold on to a 7-point lead for the win. It was the last Texas game in which he would throw a pass (for 9 yards to Limas Sweed).

After the season ended, he played in the 2004 Villages Gridiron Classic in which he led the game-winning drive.

=== Records ===
- **UT-Fewest passes intercepted (min 75 attempts), season (2), tied James Brown, Tommy Wade, Mike Cotton**
- **UT-Lowest percentage of passes intercepted (min 50 attempts), season (1.1)**
- **UT-Lowest Percentage of Passes Had Intercepted (100 attempts minimum), career (0.94%)**
- UT-Longest streak without an interception to start career (106), surpassed by Case McCoy in 2011

Bold means active

== Professional career ==
Mock went undrafted and attempted to sign on with several National Football League teams. In 2006-7, he played QB for the Austin Wranglers, of the Arena Football League, based in Austin, Texas going 4-7 for 33 yards and a TD in two game appearances.

He later became the announcer for the Wranglers until they folded in 2008. After that he worked briefly for Triton Financial, a financial firm targeted at professional athletes that also employed Ty Detmer, Koy Detmer and Chris Weinke. He left in 2009 shortly before the company was sued in a civil action by the U.S. Securities and Exchange Commission for defrauding investors in a multimillion-dollar insurance scam and before the CEO was sent to prison for 17 years. He was a co-host of the Adams Show, a radio show on Austin's ESPN radio affiliate, from August 2011 to July 2012. He is the founder of the community-based radio station WoodlandsHits.com, commentating for Woodlands Online Sports, and Partner in Action Sports, a sporting goods company.
