= Randy McEachern =

American football player (born 1955)

No. 6
- Position: Quarterback

Personal information
- Born: October 5, 1955 (age 71); Bastrop, Texas, U.S.
- Listed height: 5 ft 11 in (1.80 m)
- Listed weight: 172 lb (78 kg)

Career information
- High school: Dobie High School

Awards and highlights
- Awards: Second-team All-SWC (1977); Honors: Texas Athletics' Longhorn Hall of Honor; Records: School records - Highest average gain per attempt, season and career; School records - Highest average gain per completion, season and career; Championships: 1977 Southwest Conference Championship; Bowl Games: 1978 Cotton Bowl; 1978 Sun Bowl

Randy McEachern (/məkˈiːtʃərn/ mək-EETCH-ərn; born October 5, 1955) is an American former football player. He started as quarterback for the Texas Longhorns. He started the 1977 season as the 4th string quarterback on an unranked team and finished as the starter of the #1 team in the country, playing for the national championship.

== Early life ==
Randy McEachern was an all-district quarterback and district MVP for the Pasadena Dobie High School football team, which he led to the district championship. He was also captain of the golf team and ran track. He wanted to go to play at TCU, where his father Bobby McEachern had quarterbacked from 1951-2. TCU was interested, but they wanted him to go to Junior College first and so he prepared to go to Navarro Junior College. But then, at the urging of then-Offensive Coordinator Fred Akers, the Longhorns offered him a scholarship and he chose to go to Texas instead.

== College career ==
McEachern came to Texas as the heir apparent to All-American Marty Akins. But he didn't play in 1974 and redshirted in 1975. In the spring of 1976 he competed with Mike Cordaro for the backup position, but was lost for the season following a knee injury at the first fall scrimmage in August. In the spring of 1977, Coach Fred Akers moved him to defense as a fourth string safety, but McEachern begged to be left at quarterback and Akers relented. For three years, he never played a down. In fact, the year before the Oklahoma game that catapulted him into the role of starting quarterback, he had watched the game from the press box where he was a spotter for a radio network broadcast.

McEachern started the 1977 season as the #4 quarterback on the depth chart and was not even listed in the team's media guide. Through Texas' first three wins he threw only 4 passes, as the Longhorns went from unranked to #5 in the country. Then came the Oklahoma game. Starting quarterback Mark McBath broke his ankle on the 7th play. Backup Jon Aune lasted only another nine before tearing ligaments in his knee, and preseason #3 quarterback Ted Constanzo had injured his knee playing racquetball in July. With all three players out with what appeared to be season-ending injuries, the ball was given to McEachern. Relying on eventual Heisman Trophy winner Earl Campbell, three-time All-American kicker Russell Erxleben and solid defense, McEachern and the Longhorns did just well enough to win 13-6.

With McEachern under center - and Campbell in the backfield - Texas continued to win all season, including wins over #8 Arkansas and #14 Texas Tech. They rose to #1 in the rankings and stayed there for six weeks. In the Arkansas game, McEachern threw for 72 yards of a game-winning 80-yard touchdown drive late in the 4th quarter, and was named the Chevrolet Offensive Player of the Game. Late in the season, McEachern re-injured his knee in practice and Sam Ansley replaced him that week against TCU and the start of the next against Baylor. McEachern and Ansley alternated series in the second half against Baylor, and McEachern took over for the remainder of the season. That season, McEachern threw for 906 yards with 8 touchdowns and 4 interceptions, while rushing for 189 yards and 3 touchdowns.

For only the fourth time in Texas history, the Longhorns finished the season ranked #1, undefeated and playing in the Cotton Bowl for the national championship. But McEachern fumbled the ball on the first drive setting up a Notre Dame field goal, and went on to throw three interceptions as Notre Dame rolled to an easy win and the national championship.

On the third day of the 1978 spring practice, McEachern reinjured the knee he'd had surgery on in 1976 and underwent surgery again. Coach Akers worried that it would keep him from playing, but by the fall, McEachern was again the starter. He struggled early and after a poor showing against Oklahoma was replaced by Donnie Little who got the start the next week against North Texas State. In that game McEachern came off the bench and threw two touchdown passes to rally Texas to a come-from-behind win and reclaim his starting position. He started the next 5 games, during which Texas upset #3 Arkansas but lost to #8 Houston and was upset by unranked Baylor. He shared some time with Little, and got to play against his brother Greg, who played defense for TCU. The Baylor game would, effectively, be the end of McEachern's career. In it, former starter Mark McBath took a significant number of snaps and, for reasons that Akers never stated, was given the start the next week against Texas A&M. McBath also got the start in the 42-0 blowout win over Maryland in the Sun Bowl, a game in which McEachern played only sparingly, throwing 2 incomplete passes while rushing for -27 yards.

He finished his career at 11-4 as a starter.

=== Records ===
- Cotton Bowl - Most passes had intercepted, game (3), tied 6 others, surpassed by Joe Montana in 1979
- Cotton Bowl - Most passes had intercepted, career (3), tied 7 others, surpassed by Joe Montana in 1979
- **UT-Highest average gain per attempt, season (10.2 yards)**
- **UT-Highest average gain per attempt, career (8.5 yards)**
- **UT-Highest average gain per completion, season (20.1 yards)**
- **UT-Highest average gain per completion, career (18.4 yards)**
- UT-Touchdown passes, game (4), tied Clyde Littlefield, tied by Rick McIvor and Peter Gardere, surpassed by James Brown in 1994

Bold means active

== Later life ==
McEachern married author, and former Texas cheerleader, Jenna Hays McEachern with whom he had two children. His son Hays played football for the Oklahoma Sooners and then went into acting. He, with another former football player, started an investment company that managed bond portfolios for banks or institutions. They later sold it to Morgan Keegan.
