= List of Virginia Cavaliers football seasons =

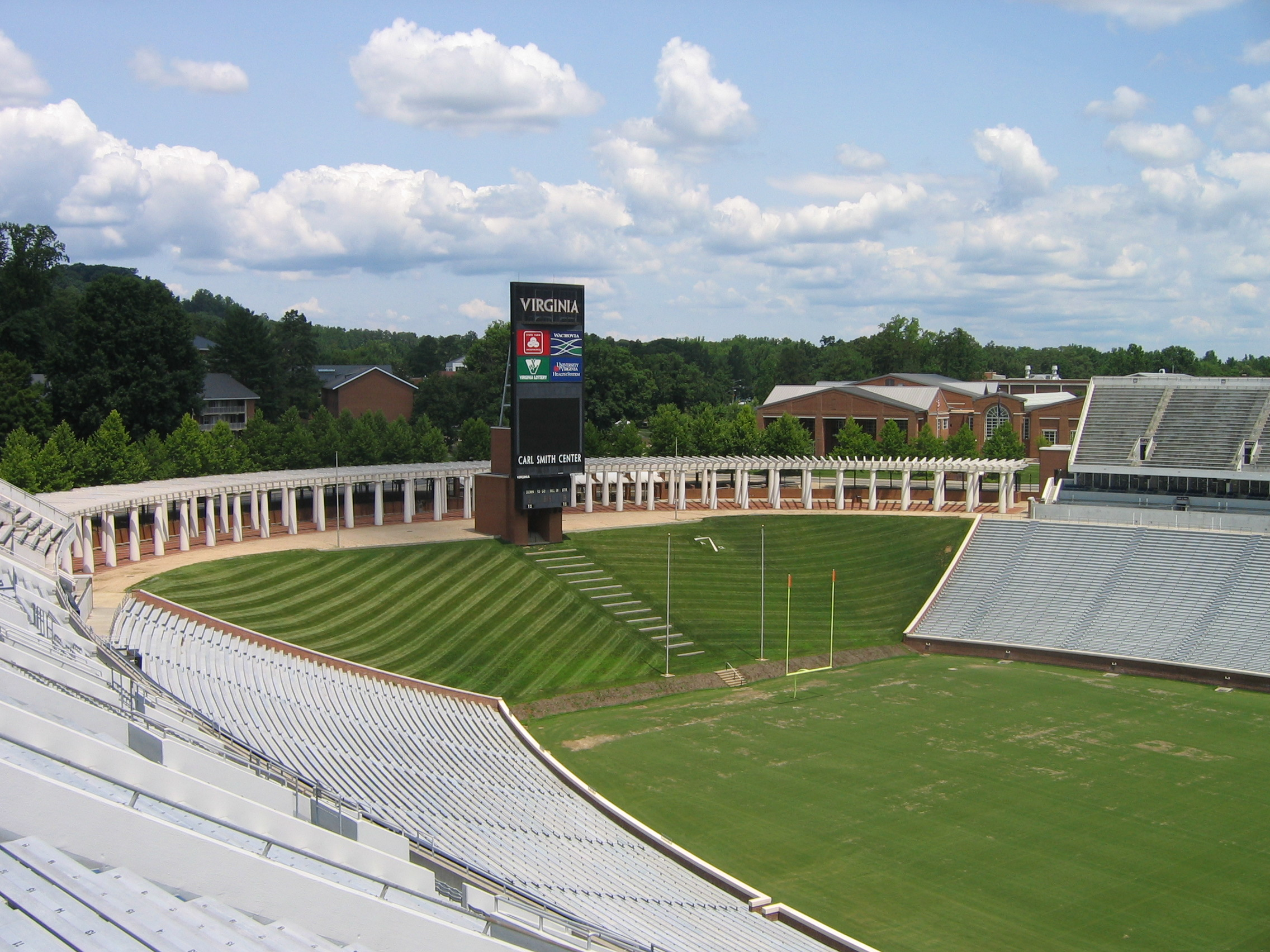
Scott Stadium, the home of Virginia football since 1931.

This is a list of Virginia Cavaliers football seasons. The Cavaliers are part of the National Collegiate Athletic Association (NCAA) Division I Football Bowl Subdivision (FBS). Since their inception in 1888, the Cavaliers have played in over 1,200 games through over a century of play along with 18 bowl games, with only an interruption from 1917 to 1918 due to World War I.

In the early years, the team played as an independent Southern team, with the result being that they were declared champions of the South on an independent level numerous times from 1889 to 1908. They played in the South Atlantic Intercollegiate Athletic Association from 1911 to 1921.

From 1921 to 1937, they played in the Southern Conference as a charter member, alongside universities such as Virginia Tech and North Carolina State. From 1937 to 1953, they played as an independent before joining the Atlantic Coast Conference in 1954.

The Cavaliers did not have much success in their early years in the ACC, as they took 12 years just to finish above 4th in the conference. Success eluded them until the hiring of George Welsh in 1982. In his third season, the team finished 2nd in the conference while winning seven games, losing twice and tying twice before being invited to the Peach Bowl, which they won 27–24 over Purdue. In 1989, they won the conference, their first conference title in over half a century, while winning 10 games for the first time in school history. The Cavaliers went to 12 bowl games during Welsh's 18 years as coach, with their highest finish in the polls being 15th in 1994. The Cavaliers won the ACC title in 1995 along with Florida State, which remains their last conference title. After Welsh retired in 2000, Al Groh was hired to become coach. In nine seasons, he led them to five bowl appearances, although he did not lead them to an ACC title prior to being fired in 2009. Mike London led the team for six seasons from 2010 to 2015, with more losing seasons (five) than bowl appearances (one). Bronco Mendenhall was hired as coach in 2016. He led them to an appearance in the Military Bowl in 2017, their first bowl appearance since 2011.

== Seasons ==
Year	Coach	Overall	Conference	Standing	Bowl/playoffs	Coaches^{#}	AP^{°}
Unknown (Independent) (1887–1891)
1887	Unknown	0–0–1					
1888	Unknown	2–1					
1889	Unknown	4–2					
1890	Unknown	5–2					
1891	Unknown	2–1–2					
William C. Spicer (Independent) (1892)
1892	William C. Spicer	3–2–1					
John Poe (Independent) (1893–1894)
1893	John Poe	8–3					
1894	John Poe	8–2					
Harry Mackey (Independent) (1895)
1895	Harry Mackey	9–2					
Martin Bergen (Independent) (1896–1897)
1896	Martin Bergen	7–2–2					
1897	Martin Bergen	6–2–1					
Joseph Massie (Independent) (1898)
1898	Joseph Massie	6–5					
Archie Hoxton (Independent) (1899–1900)
1899	Archie Hoxton	4–3–2					
1900	Archie Hoxton	7–2–1					
Wesley Abbott (Independent) (1901)
1901	Wesley Abbott	8–2					
John de Saulles (Independent) (1902)
1902	John DeSaulles	8–1–1					
Gresham Poe (Independent) (1903)
1903	Gresham Poe	7–2–1					
Foster Sanford (Independent) (1904)
1904	Foster Sanford	6–3					
William Cole (Independent) (1905–1906)
1905	William Cole	5–4					
1906	William Cole	7–2–2					
Hammond Johnson (Independent) (1907)
1907	Hammond Johnson	6–3–1					
M.T. Cooke (Independent) (1908)
1908	M.T. Cooke	7–0–1					
John Neff (Independent) (1909)
1909	John Neff	7–1					
Charles Crawford (Independent) (1910)
1910	Charles Crawford	6–2					
Kemper Yancey (Independent) (1911)
1911	Kemper Yancey	8–2					
Speed Elliott (SAIAA) (1912)
1912	Speed Elliott	6–3	1–1	3rd			
Rice Warren (SAIAA) (1913)
1913	Rice Warren	7–1	1–1	T–3rd			
Joseph Wood (SAIAA) (1914)
1914	Joseph Wood	8–1	3–0	T–1st			
Harry Varner (SAIAA) (1915)
1915	Harry Varner	8–1	2–0	T–1st			
Peyton Evans (SAIAA) (1916)
1916	Peyton Evans	4–5	2–1	T–4th			
1917	No team						
1918	No team						
Harris Coleman (SAIAA) (1919)
1919	Harris Coleman	2–5–2	1–1–1	T–7th			
Rice Warren (SAIAA) (1920–1921)
1920	Rice Warren	5–2–2	3–1	T–4th			
1921	Rice Warren	5–4	5–1	3rd			
Thomas J. Campbell (SoCon) (1922)
1922	Thomas J. Campbell	4–4–1	1–1–1	9th			
Earle Neale (SoCon) (1923–1928)
1923	Earle Neale	3–5–1	0–3–1	17th			
1924	Earle Neale	5–4	3–2	T–6th			
1925	Earle Neale	7–1–1	4–1–1	T–5th			
1926	Earle Neale	6–2–2	4–2–1	6th			
1927	Earle Neale	5–4	4–4	T–8th			
1928	Earle Neale	2–6–1	1–6	T–19th			
Earl Abell (SoCon) (1929–1930)
1929	Earl Abell	4–3–2	1–3–2	16th			
1930	Earl Abell	4–6	2–5	17th			
Fred Dawson (SoCon) (1931–1933)
1931	Fred Dawson	1–7–2	0–5–1	22nd			
1932	Fred Dawson	5–4	2–3	T–13th			
1933	Fred Dawson	2–6–2	1–3–1	8th			
Gus Tebell (SoCon) (1934–1935)
1934	Gus Tebell	3–6	1–4	9th			
1935	Gus Tebell	1–5–4	0–3–2	T–8th			
Gus Tebell (Independent) (1936)
1936	Gus Tebell	2–7					
Frank Murray (Independent) (1937–1945)
1937	Frank Murray	2–7					
1938	Frank Murray	4–4–1					
1939	Frank Murray	5–4					
1940	Frank Murray	4–5					
1941	Frank Murray	8–1					
1942	Frank Murray	2–6–1					
1943	Frank Murray	3–4–1					
1944	Frank Murray	6–1–2					
1945	Frank Murray	7–2					
Art Guepe (Independent) (1946–1952)
1946	Art Guepe	4–4–1					
1947	Art Guepe	7–3					
1948	Art Guepe	5–3–1					
1949	Art Guepe	7–2					
1950	Art Guepe	8–2					
1951	Art Guepe	8–1					13
1952	Art Guepe	8–2					
Ned McDonald (Independent) (1953)
1953	Ned McDonald	1–8					
Ned McDonald (ACC) (1954–1955)
1954	Ned McDonald	3–6	0–2	7th			
1955	Ned McDonald	1–9	0–4	8th			
Ben Martin (ACC) (1956–1957)
1956	Ben Martin	4–6	1–4	8th			
1957	Ben Martin	3–6–1	2–4	6th			
Richard Voris (ACC) (1958–1960)
1958	Richard Voris	1–9	1–5	8th			
1959	Richard Voris	0–10	0–5	8th			
1960	Richard Voris	0–10	0–6	6th			
Bill Elias (ACC) (1961–1964)
1961	Bill Elias	4–6	2–4	8th			
1962	Bill Elias	5–5	1–4	7th			
1963	Bill Elias	2–7–1	0–5–1	8th			
1964	Bill Elias	5–5	1–5	8th			
George Blackburn (ACC) (1965–1970)
1965	George Blackburn	5–5	2–4	7th			
1966	George Blackburn	4–6	3–3	T–3rd			
1967	George Blackburn	5–5	3–3	4th			
1968	George Blackburn	7–3	4–2	3rd			
1969	George Blackburn	3–7	1–5	8th			
1970	George Blackburn	5–6	0–6	8th			
Don Lawrence (ACC) (1971–1973)
1971	Don Lawrence	3–8	2–3	T–3rd			
1972	Don Lawrence	4–7	1–5	T–6th			
1973	Don Lawrence	4–7	3–3	4th			
Sonny Randle (ACC) (1974–1975)
1974	Sonny Randle	4–7	1–5	6th			
1975	Sonny Randle	1–10	0–5	7th			
Dick Bestwick (ACC) (1976–1981)
1976	Dick Bestwick	2–9	1–4	6th			
1977	Dick Bestwick	1–9–1	1–5	6th			
1978	Dick Bestwick	2–9	0–6	7th			
1979	Dick Bestwick	6–5	2–4	6th			
1980	Dick Bestwick	4–7	2–4	T–4th			
1981	Dick Bestwick	1–10	0–6	7th			
George Welsh (ACC) (1982–2000)
1982	George Welsh	2–9	1–5	6th			
1983	George Welsh	6–5	3–3	T–4th			
1984	George Welsh	8–2–2	3–1–2	2nd	W Peach	17	20
1985	George Welsh	6–5	4–3	T–3rd			
1986	George Welsh	3–8	2–5	T–6th			
1987	George Welsh	8–4	5–2	2nd	W All-American		
1988	George Welsh	7–4	5–2	2nd			
1989	George Welsh	10–3	6–1	T–1st	L Florida Citrus	15	18
1990	George Welsh	8–4	5–2	T–2nd	L Sugar	15	23
1991	George Welsh	8–3–1	4–2–1	4th	L Gator		
1992	George Welsh	7–4	4–4	T–4th			
1993	George Welsh	7–5	5–3	T–3rd	L Carquest		
1994	George Welsh	9–3	5–3	T–3rd	W Independence	13	15
1995	George Welsh	9–4	7–1	T–1st	W Peach	17	16
1996	George Welsh	7–5	5–3	4th	L Carquest		
1997	George Welsh	7–4	5–3	T–3rd			
1998	George Welsh	9–3	6–2	3rd	L Peach	18	18
1999	George Welsh	7–5	5–3	T–2nd	L MicronPC.com		
2000	George Welsh	6–6	5–3	3rd	L Oahu		
Al Groh (ACC) (2001–2009)
2001	Al Groh	5–7	3–5	T–7th			
2002	Al Groh	9–5	6–2	T–2nd	W Continental Tire	25	22
2003	Al Groh	8–5	4–4	T–4th	W Continental Tire		
2004	Al Groh	8–4	5–3	T–3rd	L MPC Computers	23	23
2005	Al Groh	7–5	3–5	5th (Coastal)	W Music City		
2006	Al Groh	5–7	4–4	3rd (Coastal)			
2007	Al Groh	9–4	6–2	2nd (Coastal)	L Gator		
2008	Al Groh	5–7	3–5	5th (Coastal)			
2009	Al Groh	3–9	2–6	6th (Coastal)			
Mike London (ACC) (2010–2015)
2010	Mike London	4–8	1–7	T–5th (Coastal)			
2011	Mike London	8–5	5–3	T–2nd (Coastal)	L Chick-fil-A		
2012	Mike London	4–8	2–6	6th (Coastal)			
2013	Mike London	2–10	0–8	7th (Coastal)			
2014	Mike London	5–7	3–5	T–5th (Coastal)			
2015	Mike London	4–8	3–5	6th (Coastal)			
Bronco Mendenhall (ACC) (2016–2021)
2016	Bronco Mendenhall	2–10	1–7	T–6th (Coastal)			
2017	Bronco Mendenhall	6–7	3–5	T–4th (Coastal)	L Military		
2018	Bronco Mendenhall	8–5	4–4	T–3rd (Coastal)	W Belk		
2019	Bronco Mendenhall	9–5	6–2	1st (Coastal)	L Orange^{†}	25	
2020	Bronco Mendenhall	5–5	4–5	9th			
2021	Bronco Mendenhall	6–6	4–4	T–3rd (Coastal)	Fenway		
Tony Elliott (ACC) (2022–present)
2022	Tony Elliott	3–7	1–6	T–6th (Coastal)			
2023	Tony Elliott	3–9	2–6	T–11th			
2024	Tony Elliott	5–7	3–5	T–10th			
2025	Tony Elliott	11–3	7–1	1st	W Gator	16	16
Total:		690–648–49 (.515)					
National championship Conference title Conference division title or championship game berth
^{†}Indicates Bowl Coalition, Bowl Alliance, BCS, or CFP / New Years' Six bowl.; ^{#}Rankings from final Coaches Poll.
