= 2026 Sacramento City Council election =

Local election in California

- June 2 (primary)

4 of 8 seats on Sacramento City Council

The 2026 Sacramento City Council election took place on June 2, 2026, to elect four of the eight seats of the Sacramento City Council. Runoffs only occur if no candidate receives more than 50% of the votes cast in the contest, but no runoffs occurred this year for the Sacramento City Council. Local elections in California are officially nonpartisan. Each councilmember is elected to a four-year term, and does not have any term limits.

== District 1 ==
Incumbent Lisa Kaplan was elected to the 1st district in 2022 in the runoff with 60.6% of the vote. She was running for reelection.

=== Candidates ===
Three candidates were certified for the ballot:

- Venkat Mechineni, information technology specialist
- Jennifer "Jenn" Chawla, federal investigative specialist
- Lisa Kaplan, incumbent Sacramento city councilmember

=== Endorsements ===
Jennifer "Jenn" Chawla

Organizations

- Fem Dems of Sacramento
- Gun Sense Voter
- Indian American Impact
- Los Rios College Federation of Teachers

Political party chapters

- Sacramento County Democratic Party
- Working Families Party

Individuals

- Kevin McCarty, incumbent Sacramento mayor
- Karina Talamantes, incumbent Sacramento city councilmember and vice mayor from the 3rd district

Newspapers

- The Sacramento Bee

Labor unions

- National Union of Healthcare Workers
- SEIU Committee of Interns and Residents
- SEIU Local 1021
- SEIU Local 2015
Lisa M. Kaplan

Organizations

- Sacramento Democratic Alliance

Labor unions

- IBEW Local 340
- OE Local 3

Political party chapters

- Women Democrats of Sacramento County

=== Results ===
2026 Sacramento City Council 1st district election
Primary election
Candidate	Votes	%
Lisa M. Kaplan (incumbent)	8,592	52.7
Jennifer "Jenn" Chawla	6,855	42.1
Venkat Mechineni	854	5.2
Total votes	16,301	100.0

== District 3 ==
Incumbent Karina Talamantes was elected to the 3rd district in 2022 in the runoff with 53.8% of the vote.

=== Candidates ===
One candidate was certified for the ballot:

- Karina Talamantes, incumbent Sacramento city councilmember

=== Endorsements ===
Karina Talamantes

Organizations

- CAIR Action
- Fem Dems of Sacramento
- Gun Sense Voter
- Los Rios College Federation of Teachers
- Planned Parenthood Advocates Mar Monte
- Vote for Peace

Political party chapters

- Sacramento County Democratic Party
- Sacramento County Young Democrats
- Women Democrats of Sacramento County

Labor unions

- National Union of Healthcare Workers
- OE Local 3
- SEIU Local 1021
- SEIU Local 2015

=== Results ===
2026 Sacramento City Council 3rd district election
Primary election
Candidate	Votes	%
Karina Talamantes (incumbent)	9,176	100.0
Total votes	9,176	100.0

== District 5 ==
Incumbent Caity Maple was elected to the 5th district in 2022 in the runoff with 52.3% of the vote. She was running for reelection.

=== Candidates ===
Three candidates were certified for the ballot:

- Caity Maple, incumbent Sacramento city councilmember
- Santiago Mario Morales Jr., analyst
- Henry Harry, retired deputy sheriff

=== Endorsements ===
Caity Maple

Organizations

- Fem Dems of Sacramento
- Gun Sense Voter
- Los Rios College Federation of Teachers
- North State Building Industry Association Political Action Committee
- Planned Parenthood Advocates Mar Monte

Political party chapters

- California Young Democrats
- Sacramento County Democratic Party
- Sacramento County Young Democrats
- Women Democrats of Sacramento County

Newspapers

- The Sacramento Bee

Labor unions

- IBEW Local 340
- National Union of Healthcare Workers
- OE Local 3
- Sacramento Area Firefighters Local 522
- SEIU Local 1021
- SEIU Local 2015

=== Results ===
2026 Sacramento City Council 5th district election
Primary election
Candidate	Votes	%
Caity Maple (incumbent)	7,235	68.2
Henry Harry	1,751	16.5
Santiago Mario Morales Jr.	1,630	15.4
Total votes	10,616	100.0

== District 7 ==
Incumbent Rick Jennings was elected to the 7th district in 2014, 2018, and 2022. He was running for reelection.

=== Candidates ===
Three candidates were certified for the ballot:

- Scott Lau, city planner
- Rick Jennings, incumbent Sacramento city councilmember
- Mark R. Velasquez, deputy city attorney

=== Endorsements ===
Rick Jennings

Organizations

- Sacramento Democratic Alliance

Newspapers

- The Sacramento Bee

Labor unions

- IBEW Local 340
- OE Local 3
Scott Lau

Political party chapters

- Forward Party of California
- Women Democrats of Sacramento County

Organizations

- Run for Something

=== Results ===
2026 Sacramento City Council 7th district election
Primary election
Candidate	Votes	%
Rick Jennings (incumbent)	14,120	56.8
Scott Lau	6,760	27.2
Mark R. Velasquez	3,989	16.0
Total votes	24,869	100.0
