= 1914 Johns Hopkins Blue Jays football team =

American college football season

1914 Johns Hopkins Blue Jays football
- Conference: South Atlantic Intercollegiate Athletic Association
- Record: 2–5–1 (0–1 SAIAA)
- Head coach: John H. Gates (2nd season)
- Home stadium: Homewood Field

1914 South Atlantic Intercollegiate Athletic Association football standings
	Conf.					Overall
Team	W		L		T	W		L		T
Washington and Lee +	3	–	0	–	0	9	–	0	–	0
Virginia +	3	–	0	–	0	8	–	1	–	0
North Carolina	1	–	1	–	0	10	–	1	–	0
VPI	1	–	1	–	0	6	–	2	–	1
Georgetown	0	–	1	–	1	2	–	4	–	2
North Carolina A&M	0	–	2	–	1	3	–	3	–	1
St. John's (MD)	0	–	1	–	0	0	–	1	–	0
Johns Hopkins	0	–	1	–	0	2	–	5	–	1
Richmond	0	–	2	–	0	5	–	4	–	0
+ – Conference co-champions

The 1914 Johns Hopkins Blue Jays football team was an American football team that represented Johns Hopkins University during the 1914 college football season as a member of the South Atlantic Intercollegiate Athletic Association. In their second year under head coach John H. Gates, the team compiled an overall record of 2–5–1.

== Schedule ==
Date	Opponent	Site	Result	Source
October 10	Stevens*	Homewood Field; Baltimore, MD	W 16–13	
October 17	Washington College*	Homewood Field; Baltimore, MD	W 14–6	
October 24	Maryland*	Homewood Field; Baltimore, MD	L 0–14	
October 31	at Lehigh*	Taylor Stadium; South Bethlehem, PA	L 0–33	
November 7	Gettysburg*	Homewood Field; Baltimore, MD	T 7–7	
November 14	Haverford*	Homewood Field; Baltimore, MD	L 0–10	
November 21	Western Maryland*	Homewood Field; Baltimore, MD	L 0–6	
November 26	St. John's (MD)	Homewood Field; Baltimore, MD	L 13–34	
*Non-conference game
