= 1973 Wake Forest Demon Deacons football team =

American college football season

1973 Wake Forest Demon Deacons football
- Conference: Atlantic Coast Conference
- Record: 1–9–1 (0–5–1 ACC)
- Head coach: Chuck Mills (1st season)
- Captains: John Hardin; Clayton Heath; Ron Lennon
- Home stadium: Groves Stadium

1973 Atlantic Coast Conference football standings
	Conf.					Overall
Team	W		L		T	W		L		T
No. 16 NC State $	6	–	0	–	0	9	–	3	–	0
No. 20 Maryland	5	–	1	–	0	8	–	4	–	0
Clemson	4	–	2	–	0	5	–	6	–	0
Virginia	3	–	3	–	0	4	–	7	–	0
Duke	1	–	4	–	1	2	–	8	–	1
North Carolina	1	–	5	–	0	4	–	7	–	0
Wake Forest	0	–	5	–	1	1	–	9	–	1
$ – Conference champion; Rankings from AP Poll

The 1973 Wake Forest Demon Deacons football team was an American football team that represented Wake Forest University in the Atlantic Coast Conference during the 1973 NCAA Division I football season. In its first season under head coach Chuck Mills, the team compiled a 1–9–1 record (0–5–1 against ACC opponents) and finished last in the conference.

== Schedule ==
Date	Opponent	Site	Result	Attendance	Source
September 15	Florida State*	Groves Stadium; Winston-Salem, NC	W 9–7	18,000	
September 22	William & Mary*	Groves Stadium; Winston-Salem, NC	L 14–15	18,000	
September 29	at Richmond*	City Stadium; Richmond, VA	L 0–41	11,423	
October 6	at No. 13 Texas*	Memorial Stadium; Austin, TX	L 0–41	51,700	
October 13	South Carolina*	Groves Stadium; Winston-Salem, NC	L 12–28	21,200	
October 20	Maryland	Groves Stadium; Winston-Salem, NC	L 0–37	19,500	
October 27	at Virginia	Scott Stadium; Charlottesville, VA	L 10–21	16,100	
November 3	at Clemson	Memorial Stadium; Clemson, SC	L 8–35	23,000–25,000	
November 10	Duke	Groves Stadium; Winston-Salem, NC (rivalry)	T 7–7	20,500	
November 17	at North Carolina	Kenan Memorial Stadium; Chapel Hill, NC (rivalry)	L 0–42	37,500	
November 24	at No. 16 NC State	Carter Stadium; Raleigh, NC (rivalry)	L 13–52	31,100	
*Non-conference game; Rankings from AP Poll released prior to the game

== Personnel ==
1973 Wake Forest Demon Deacons football team roster
Players
Coaches
Offense

Pos.	#	Name	Class
QB		Andy Carlton
RB		Clayton Heath (C)
OL		Ron Lennon (C)
WR		Walter Sims

Defense

Pos.	#	Name	Class
DL		John Hardin (C)

Special teams

Pos.	#	Name	Class
P		Chuck Ramsey

Head coach

- Chuck Mills

Coordinators/assistant coaches

Legend

- (C) Team captain
- (S) Suspended
- (I) Ineligible
- Injured
- Redshirt

== Team leaders ==
Category	Team Leader	Att/Cth	Yds
Passing	Andy Carlton	51/141	605
Rushing	Clayton Heath	178	616
Receiving	Walter Sims	12	143
