= 2022 Sacramento City Council election =

Local election in California

- June 7 (primary); November 8 (runoff)

4 of 8 seats on Sacramento City Council

The 2022 Sacramento City Council election took place on June 7, 2022, to elect four of the eight seats of the Sacramento City Council, with runoff elections taking place on November 8, 2022. Runoffs only occurred if no candidate receives more than 50% of the votes cast in the contest. Local elections in California are officially nonpartisan. Each councilmember is elected to a four-year term, and does not have any term limits.

== District 1 ==
Incumbent Angelique Ashby was elected to the 1st district in 2010, 2014, and 2018. She was eligible for reelection, but chose not run for reelection.

=== Endorsements ===
Lisa Kaplan

Organizations

- Fem Dems of Sacramento
- Planned Parenthood Advocates Mar Monte (NV)
- Sacramento Democratic Alliance
- Stonewall Democrats of Greater Sacramento

Political party chapters

- Sacramento County Democratic Party

Newspapers

- The Sacramento Bee
Nate Pelczar

Individuals

- Angelique Ashby, outgoing member of the Sacramento City Council from the 1st district

Political party chapters

- Sacramento County Young Democrats

=== Results ===
2022 Sacramento City Council 1st district election
Primary election
Candidate	Votes	%
Lisa Kaplan	5,917	48.9
Alyssa Lozano	3,290	27.2
Nate Pelczar	2,475	20.4
Robert Alvis	421	3.5
Total votes	12,103	100.0
General election
Lisa Kaplan	10,314	60.6
Alyssa Lozano	6,695	39.4
Total votes	17,009	100.0

== District 3 ==
Incumbent Jeff Harris was elected to the 3rd district in 2014 and 2018. He was eligible for reelection, but chose not run for reelection.

=== Endorsements ===
Karina Talamantes

Organizations

- Fem Dems of Sacramento
- Planned Parenthood Advocates Mar Monte (NV)
- Sacramento Latino Democratic Club

Political party chapters

- Sacramento County Democratic Party
- Sacramento County Young Democrats

Newspapers

- The Sacramento Bee

Labor unions

- National Nurses United
- Sacramento Area Firefighters Local 522
- Sacramento Central Labor Council
Michael Lynch

Organizations

- Sacramento Democratic Alliance

=== Results ===
2022 Sacramento City Council 3rd district election
Primary election
Candidate	Votes	%
Karina Talamantes	4,653	49.3
Michael Lynch	3,859	40.9
Adrianne Gonzales	925	9.8
Total votes	9,437	100.0
General election
Karina Talamantes	7,473	53.8
Michael Lynch	6,417	46.2
Total votes	13,890	100.0

== District 5 ==
Incumbent Jay Schenirer was elected to the 5th district in 2010, 2014, and 2018. He was eligible for reelection, but chose not run for reelection.

=== Endorsements ===
Caity Maple

Political party chapters

- Sacramento County Democratic Party
- Sacramento County Young Democrats

Organizations

- Fem Dems of Sacramento
- Sacramento Latino Democratic Club
- Stonewall Democrats of Greater Sacramento

Newspapers

- The Sacramento Bee

Labor unions

- National Nurses United
- Sacramento Central Labor Council
Tamiko Heim

Organizations

- Planned Parenthood Advocates Mar Monte (NV)
- Sacramento Democratic Alliance

=== Results ===
2022 Sacramento City Council 5th district election
Primary election
Candidate	Votes	%
Caity Maple	3,801	43.1
Tamiko Heim	3,224	36.5
Kimberly Sow	1,180	13.4
Chris Baker	621	7.0
Total votes	8,826	100.0
General election
Caity Maple	6,665	52.3
Tamiko Heim	6,067	47.7
Total votes	12,732	100.0

== District 7 ==
Incumbent Rick Jennings was elected to the 7th district in 2014 and 2018. He was eligible for reelection.

=== Endorsements ===
Rick Jennings

Organizations

- Sacramento Democratic Alliance

=== Results ===
2022 Sacramento City Council 7th district election
Primary election
Candidate	Votes	%
Rick Jennings (incumbent)	18,359	100.0
Total votes	18,359	100.0
