= 1973 Maryland Terrapins football team =

American college football season

1973 Maryland Terrapins football

Peach Bowl, L 16–17 vs. Georgia
- Conference: Atlantic Coast Conference

Ranking
- Coaches: No. 18
- AP: No. 20
- Record: 8–4 (5–1 ACC)
- Head coach: Jerry Claiborne (2nd season)
- Home stadium: Byrd Stadium

1973 Atlantic Coast Conference football standings
	Conf.					Overall
Team	W		L		T	W		L		T
No. 16 NC State $	6	–	0	–	0	9	–	3	–	0
No. 20 Maryland	5	–	1	–	0	8	–	4	–	0
Clemson	4	–	2	–	0	5	–	6	–	0
Virginia	3	–	3	–	0	4	–	7	–	0
Duke	1	–	4	–	1	2	–	8	–	1
North Carolina	1	–	5	–	0	4	–	7	–	0
Wake Forest	0	–	5	–	1	1	–	9	–	1
$ – Conference champion; Rankings from AP Poll

The 1973 Maryland Terrapins football team represented the University of Maryland in the 1973 NCAA Division I football season. In their second season under head coach Jerry Claiborne, the Terrapins compiled an 8–4 record (5–1 in conference), finished in second place in the Atlantic Coast Conference, and outscored their opponents 335 to 141. The team ended its season with a 17–16 loss to Georgia in the 1973 Peach Bowl. The team's statistical leaders included Al Neville with 554 passing yards, Louis Carter with 801 rushing yards, and Frank Russell with 468 receiving yards.

== Schedule ==
Date	Time	Opponent	Rank	Site	Result	Attendance	Source
September 15		West Virginia*		Byrd Stadium; College Park, MD (rivalry)	L 13–20	35,112	
September 22		at North Carolina		Kenan Memorial Stadium; Chapel Hill, NC	W 23–3	37,500	
September 29	1:30 p.m.	Villanova*		Byrd Stadium; College Park, MD	W 31–3	31,260	
October 6		Syracuse*		Byrd Stadium; College Park, MD	W 38–0	32,800	
October 13		at NC State		Carter Stadium; Raleigh, NC	L 22–24	39,200	
October 20		at Wake Forest		Groves Stadium; Winston-Salem, NC	W 37–0	19,500	
October 27		vs. Duke		Foreman Field; Norfolk, VA (Oyster Bowl)	W 30–10	20,500	
November 3		No. 6 Penn State*		Byrd Stadium; College Park, MD (rivalry)	L 22–42	44,135	
November 10		Virginia		Byrd Stadium; College Park, MD (rivalry)	W 33–0	22,300	
November 17		at Clemson		Memorial Stadium; Clemson, SC	W 28–13	31,500	
November 24		No. 17 Tulane*		Byrd Stadium; College Park, MD	W 42–9	19,416	
December 28		vs. Georgia*	No. 18	Atlanta Stadium; Atlanta, GA (Peach Bowl)	L 16–17	38,107	
*Non-conference game; Rankings from AP Poll released prior to the game; All times are in Eastern time

== Game summaries ==
=== Penn State ===
Penn State vs. Maryland

Quarter	1	2	3	4	Total
#6 Penn State	12	10	20	0	42
Maryland	10	12	0	0	22

at Byrd Stadium • College Park, MD

- Date: Saturday, November 3, 1973
- Game attendance: 44,135

Game information

First Quarter

- PSU — Hayman 98-yard kickoff return (kick failed).
- PSU — Nagle 3-yard run (pass failed).
- MD — Russell 34-yard pass from Roy (Mike-Mayer kick).
- MD — FG Mike-Mayer 21.

Second Quarter

- MD — White 11-yard pass from Carter (pass failed).
- PSU — Natale 17-yard pass from Shuman (Bahr kick).
- PSU — FG Bahr 39.
- MD — Smith 83-yard punt return (kick failed).

Third Quarter

- PSU — Scott 29-yard pass from Shuman (Bahr kick).
- PSU — Natale 3-yard pass from Shuman (Bahr kick).
- PSU — FG Bahr 25.
- PSU — FG Bahr 28.

Fourth Quarter

- (No scoring)

Team	Category	Player	Statistics
PSU	Passing	Shuman	7/14, 111 Yds, 3 TD
PSU	Rushing	Cappelletti	37 Rush, 202 Yds
PSU	Receiving	Natale	6 Rec, 82 Yds, 2 TD
MD	Passing	Neville	10/25, 86 Yds, 2 INT
MD	Rushing	Carter	12 Rush, 30 Yds
MD	Receiving	White	4 Rec, 60 Yds, 1 TD

== Roster ==
1973 Maryland Terrapins football team roster
Players
Coaches
Offense

Pos.	#	Name	Class
QB	17	Bob Avellini	Jr
RB	32	Louis Carter	Jr
RB	25	Rick Jennings	So

Defense

Pos.	#	Name	Class
DE	79	Joe Campbell	Fr
DB	46	Ken Schroy	Jr
DE	94	Randy White	Jr

Special teams

Pos.	#	Name	Class
K	1	Steve Mike-Mayer	Jr

Head coach

- Jerry Claiborne

Coordinators/assistant coaches

Legend

- (C) Team captain
- (S) Suspended
- (I) Ineligible
- Injured
- Redshirt
