= 1914 North Carolina A&M Aggies football team =

American college football season

1914 North Carolina A&M Aggies football
- Conference: South Atlantic Intercollegiate Athletic Association
- Record: 3–3–1 (0–2–1 SAIAA)
- Head coach: Jack Hegarty (1st season)
- Home stadium: Riddick Stadium

1914 South Atlantic Intercollegiate Athletic Association football standings
	Conf.					Overall
Team	W		L		T	W		L		T
Washington and Lee +	3	–	0	–	0	9	–	0	–	0
Virginia +	3	–	0	–	0	8	–	1	–	0
North Carolina	1	–	1	–	0	10	–	1	–	0
VPI	1	–	1	–	0	6	–	2	–	1
Georgetown	0	–	1	–	1	2	–	4	–	2
North Carolina A&M	0	–	2	–	1	3	–	3	–	1
St. John's (MD)	0	–	1	–	0	0	–	1	–	0
Johns Hopkins	0	–	1	–	0	2	–	5	–	1
Richmond	0	–	2	–	0	5	–	4	–	0
+ – Conference co-champions

The 1914 North Carolina A&M Aggies football team represented the North Carolina A&M Aggies of North Carolina College of Agriculture and Mechanic Arts (now known as North Carolina State University) during the 1914 college football season. The team was a member of the South Atlantic Intercollegiate Athletic Association.

== Schedule ==
Date	Time	Opponent	Site	Result	Attendance	Source
October 3		Wake Forest*	Riddick Stadium; Raleigh, NC (rivalry)	W 51–0		
October 10		Norfolk Blues*	Riddick Stadium; Raleigh, NC	W 21–7		
October 22	3:00 p.m.	West Virginia*	Riddick Stadium; Raleigh, NC	W 26–13		
October 31		at Navy*	Worden Field; Annapolis, MD	L 14–16		
November 7		at Georgetown	Georgetown Field; Washington, DC	T 7–7		
November 14	3:00 p.m.	vs. VPI	Fair Grounds; Roanoke, VA	L 0–3	400	
November 26		vs. Washington and Lee	League Park; Norfolk, VA	L 0–7	5,000	
*Non-conference game
