= 1973 Furman Paladins football team =

American college football season

1973 Furman Paladins football
- Conference: Southern Conference
- Record: 7–4 (3–3 SoCon)
- Head coach: Art Baker (1st season)
- Captains: Mike Bartik; Keith Downey; Tom Scherich
- Home stadium: Sirrine Stadium

1973 Southern Conference football standings
	Conf.					Overall
Team	W		L		T	W		L		T
East Carolina $	7	–	0	–	0	9	–	2	–	0
Richmond	5	–	1	–	0	8	–	2	–	0
William & Mary	3	–	2	–	0	6	–	5	–	0
Furman	3	–	3	–	0	7	–	4	–	0
Appalachian State	2	–	2	–	0	3	–	7	–	1
VMI	2	–	4	–	0	2	–	9	–	0
Davidson	1	–	6	–	0	2	–	8	–	0
The Citadel	1	–	6	–	0	3	–	8	–	0
$ – Conference champion

The 1973 Furman Paladins football team was an American football team that represented Furman University as a member of the Southern Conference (SoCon) during the 1973 NCAA Division I football season. In their first season under head coach Art Baker, Furman compiled a 7–4 record, with a mark of 3–3 in conference play, placing tied for fourth in the SoCon.

== Schedule ==
Date	Time	Opponent	Site	Result	Attendance	Source
September 8		at Presbyterian*	Bailey Stadium; Clinton, SC	W 13–6		
September 15		Appalachian State	Sirrine Stadium; Greenville, SC	W 17–0	15,000	
September 22		at Wofford*	Snyder Field; Spartanburg, SC (rivalry)	W 21–19		
September 29		at East Carolina	Ficklen Memorial Stadium; Greenville, NC	L 3–14	16,270	
October 6		Richmond	Sirrine Stadium; Greenville, SC	L 17–20		
October 13		Davidson	Sirrine Stadium; Greenville, SC	W 38–7		
October 20		VMI	Sirrine Stadium; Greenville, SC	W 19–13	10,000	
October 27		East Tennessee State*	Sirrine Stadium; Greenville, SC	W 40–21		
November 3		at Lenoir–Rhyne*	College Stadium; Hickory, NC	W 52–20		
November 10		at The Citadel	Johnson Hagood Stadium; Charleston, SC (rivalry)	L 21–26	12,650	
November 17	1:58 p.m.	at Louisville*	Fairgrounds Stadium; Louisville, KY	L 14–35	5,118	
*Non-conference game; All times are in Eastern time
