= 1914 North Carolina Tar Heels football team =

College football team season

1914 North Carolina Tar Heels football
- Conference: South Atlantic Intercollegiate Athletic Association
- Record: 10–1 (1–1 SAIAA)
- Head coach: Thomas Trenchard (3rd season)
- Captain: Dave Tayloe
- Home stadium: Campus Athletic Field (II)

1914 South Atlantic Intercollegiate Athletic Association football standings
	Conf.					Overall
Team	W		L		T	W		L		T
Washington and Lee +	3	–	0	–	0	9	–	0	–	0
Virginia +	3	–	0	–	0	8	–	1	–	0
North Carolina	1	–	1	–	0	10	–	1	–	0
VPI	1	–	1	–	0	6	–	2	–	1
Georgetown	0	–	1	–	1	2	–	4	–	2
North Carolina A&M	0	–	2	–	1	3	–	3	–	1
St. John's (MD)	0	–	1	–	0	0	–	1	–	0
Johns Hopkins	0	–	1	–	0	2	–	5	–	1
Richmond	0	–	2	–	0	5	–	4	–	0
+ – Conference co-champions

The 1914 North Carolina Tar Heels football team represented the University of North Carolina in the 1914 college football season. The team captain of the 1914 season was Dave Tayloe.

== Schedule ==
Date	Time	Opponent	Site	Result	Attendance	Source
September 26		Richmond	Campus Athletic Field (II); Chapel Hill, NC	W 41–0		
October 3		Medical College of Virginia*	Campus Athletic Field (II); Chapel Hill, NC	W 65–0		
October 8		vs. Wake Forest*	Lakewood Park Fairgrounds; Durham, NC (rivalry)	W 53–0		
October 12		South Carolina*	Campus Athletic Field (II); Chapel Hill, NC (rivalry)	W 48–0		
October 17	3:00 p.m.	vs. Georgia*	Grant Field; Atlanta, GA	W 41–6		
October 20		at Riverside Military Academy*	Gainesville, GA	W 40–0		
October 24	3:45 p.m.	at Vanderbilt*	Old Dudley Field; Nashville, TN	W 10–9	3,000	
October 31	3:30 p.m.	vs. Davidson*	Prince Albert Park; Winston-Salem, NC	W 16–3	1,500	
November 7	3:00 p.m.	vs. VMI*	Wearn Field; Charlotte, NC	W 30–7		
November 14		vs. Wake Forest*	League Park (Raleigh); Raleigh, NC	W 12–7		
November 26	2:30 p.m.	vs. Virginia	Broad Street Park (II); Richmond, VA (rivalry)	L 3–20	15,000	
*Non-conference game
