= Jogger Elcock =

American football player, coach, and referee (1888–1964)

Biographical details
- Born: December 6, 1888; Boston, Massachusetts, U.S.
- Died: June 10, 1964 (aged 75); Greensboro, North Carolina, U.S.

Playing career
- 1909–1911: Dartmouth
- Position: Tackle

Coaching career (HC unless noted)
- 1913: Dartmouth (assistant)
- 1914–1916: Washington and Lee
- 1917: Camp Gordon
- 1920–1921: Oglethorpe

Head coaching record
- Overall: 34–12–4

Accomplishments and honors

Championships
- 2 SAIAA (1914–1915)

Walter Benjamin "Jogger" Elcock (December 6, 1888 – June 10, 1964) was an American football player, coach, and referee. He played college football at Dartmouth College as a tackle from 1909 to 1911. Elcock served as the head football coach at Washington and Lee University from 1914 to 1916 and at Oglethorpe University from 1920 to 1921. He was also the head coach of the 1917 Camp Gordon football team. Elcock's 1914 Washington and Lee team went undefeated and outscored opponents 324 to 12.

Elcock was a native of Dorchester, Massachusetts. He graduated from Dartmouth in 1912 and served as an assistant football coach at his alma mater under Frank Cavanaugh in 1913.

== Head coaching record ==
Year	Team	Overall	Conference	Standing	Bowl/playoffs
Washington and Lee Generals (South Atlantic Intercollegiate Athletic Association) (1914–1916)
1914	Washington and Lee	9–0	3–0	T–1st	
1915	Washington and Lee	6–1–1	2–0	T–1st	
1916	Washington and Lee	5–2–2	1–0	3rd	
Washington and Lee:		20–3–3	6–0		
Camp Gordon (Independent) (1917)
1917	Camp Gordon	5–1			
Oglethorpe Stormy Petrels (Independent) (1920)
1920	Oglethorpe	4–4–1			
Oglethorpe Stormy Petrels (Southern Intercollegiate Athletic Association) (1921)
1921	Oglethorpe	5–4	2–4	T–16th	
Oglethorpe:		9–8–1	2–4		
Total:		34–12–4			
