= 1973 Tennessee Tech Golden Eagles football team =

American college football season

1973 Tennessee Tech Golden Eagles football
- Conference: Ohio Valley Conference
- Record: 2–8–1 (1–6 OVC)
- Head coach: Don Wade (6th season)
- Home stadium: Tucker Stadium

1973 Ohio Valley Conference football standings
	Conf.					Overall
Team	W		L		T	W		L		T
No. 3 Western Kentucky $^	7	–	0	–	0	12	–	1	–	0
Murray State	5	–	2	–	0	7	–	3	–	0
Eastern Kentucky	4	–	3	–	0	7	–	4	–	0
Morehead State	4	–	3	–	0	6	–	5	–	0
East Tennessee State	3	–	4	–	0	4	–	7	–	0
Middle Tennessee	3	–	4	–	0	4	–	7	–	0
Tennessee Tech	1	–	6	–	0	2	–	8	–	1
Austin Peay	1	–	6	–	0	2	–	8	–	0
$ – Conference champion; ^ – NCAA Division II playoff participant; Rankings from AP small college poll

The 1973 Tennessee Tech Golden Eagles football team represented Tennessee Technological University as a member of the Ohio Valley Conference (OVC) during the 1973 NCAA Division II football season. Led by sixth-year head coach Don Wade, the Golden Eagles compiled an overall record of 2–8–1 with a mark of 1–6 in conference play, tying for seventh place in the OVC. Tennessee Tech played home games at Tucker Stadium in Cookeville, Tennessee.

== Schedule ==
Date	Opponent	Site	Result	Attendance	Source
September 8	at Western Carolina*	E. J. Whitmire Stadium; Cullowhee, NC	T 10–10	6,200	
September 15	South Dakota*	Tucker Stadium; Cookeville, TN	L 0–30	7,200	
September 22	at Murray State	Roy Stewart Stadium; Murray, KY	L 17–18	9,279	
September 29	Tennessee–Martin*	Tucker Stadium; Cookeville, TN	W 16–9	7,249	
October 6	East Tennessee State	Tucker Stadium; Cookeville, TN	L 14–27	7,500	
October 13	at No. 11 Western Kentucky	L. T. Smith Stadium; Bowling Green, KY	L 0–41	13,150	
October 20	Morehead State	Tucker Stadium; Cookeville, TN	L 10–23	10,150	
October 27	at Chattanooga*	Chamberlain Field; Chattanooga, TN	L 3–7	3,747	
November 3	at Eastern Kentucky	Hanger Field; Richmond, KY	L 14–30	7,800	
November 10	Austin Peay	Tucker Stadium; Cookeville, TN	W 31–12	3,000	
November 17	at Middle Tennessee	Horace Jones Field; Murfreesboro, TN	L 10–17	7,500	
*Non-conference game; Rankings from AP Poll released prior to the game
