= 1973 William & Mary Indians football team =

American college football season

1973 William & Mary Indians football
- Conference: Southern Conference
- Record: 6–5 (3–2 SoCon)
- Head coach: Jim Root (2nd season)
- Offensive coordinator: Paul Schudel (2nd season)
- Defensive coordinator: Lou Tepper (2nd season)
- Captains: Joe Montgomery; Randy Rovesti
- Home stadium: Cary Field

1973 Southern Conference football standings
	Conf.					Overall
Team	W		L		T	W		L		T
East Carolina $	7	–	0	–	0	9	–	2	–	0
Richmond	5	–	1	–	0	8	–	2	–	0
William & Mary	3	–	2	–	0	6	–	5	–	0
Furman	3	–	3	–	0	7	–	4	–	0
Appalachian State	2	–	2	–	0	3	–	7	–	1
VMI	2	–	4	–	0	2	–	9	–	0
Davidson	1	–	6	–	0	2	–	8	–	0
The Citadel	1	–	6	–	0	3	–	8	–	0
$ – Conference champion

The 1973 William & Mary Indians football team represented the College of William & Mary as a member of the Southern Conference (SoCon) during the 1973 NCAA Division I football season. Led by Jim Root in his second year as head coach, William & Mary finished the season 6–5 overall and 3–2 in SoCon play to place third.

== Schedule ==
Date	Time	Opponent	Site	Result	Attendance	Source
September 8		at Virginia Tech*	Lane Stadium; Blacksburg, VA	W 31–24	18,500	
September 15		at North Carolina*	Kenan Memorial Stadium; Chapel Hill, NC	L 27–34	33,500	
September 22		at Wake Forest*	Groves Stadium; Winston-Salem, NC	W 15–14	18,000	
September 29		at The Citadel	Johnson Hagood Stadium; Charleston, SC	W 24–12	13,650	
October 6	1:30 p.m.	Villanova*	Cary Field; Williamsburg, VA	W 33–21	12,000–12,200	
October 13		at Vanderbilt*	Dudley Field; Nashville, TN	L 7–20	17,123	
October 20		Davidson	Cary Field; Williamsburg, VA	W 51–35	13,500	
October 27		VMI	Cary Field; Williamsburg, VA (rivalry)	W 45–14	9,500	
November 3		at East Carolina	Ficklen Stadium; Greenville, NC	L 3–34		
November 10		Colgate*	Cary Field; Williamsburg, VA	L 42–49	7,500	
November 17		Richmond	Cary Field; Williamsburg, VA (rivalry)	L 0–31	15,500	
*Non-conference game; All times are in Eastern time
