= Don Wade =

American football coach and college athletics administrator

Biographical details
- Born: August 10, 1928
- Died: June 7, 2007 (aged 78); Clemson, South Carolina, U.S.

Playing career
- 1950–1952: Clemson
- Position: Linebacker

Coaching career (HC unless noted)
- 1953–1958: Clemson (freshmen)
- 1959–1967: Clemson (OL)
- 1968–1982: Tennessee Tech

Administrative career (AD unless noted)
- 1974–1980: Tennessee Tech

Head coaching record
- Overall: 81–78–3

Accomplishments and honors

Championships
- 2 OVC (1972, 1975)

Awards
- 3× OVC Coach of the Year (1971–1972, 1975)

James Donald Wade (August 10, 1928 – June 7, 2007) was an American college football coach and athletics administrator. He served as the head coach at Tennessee Tech from 1968 to 1982, compiling a record of 81–78–3. Wade was also the athletic director at Tennessee Tech from 1974 to 1980.

A native of Tyronza, Arkansas, Wade played college football at Clemson University as a linebacker from 1950 to 1952 for head coach Frank Howard. He served as an assistant coach at his alma mater under Howard from 1953 to 1967. Wade died on June 7, 2006, in Clemson, South Carolina.

== Head coaching record ==
Year	Team	Overall	Conference	Standing	Bowl/playoffs	UPI^{#}
Tennessee Tech Golden Eagles (Ohio Valley Conference) (1968–1982)
1968	Tennessee Tech	2–8	2–5	6th		
1969	Tennessee Tech	5–5	4–3	T–3rd		
1970	Tennessee Tech	4–6	2–5	T–6th		
1971	Tennessee Tech	8–2	5–2	T–2nd		
1972	Tennessee Tech	10–2	7–0	1st	L Grantland Rice	8
1973	Tennessee Tech	2–8–1	1–6	T–7th		
1974	Tennessee Tech	6–5	4–3	4th		
1975	Tennessee Tech	8–3	6–1	1st		
1976	Tennessee Tech	8–3	5–2	2nd		
1977	Tennessee Tech	9–2	5–2	2nd		
1978	Tennessee Tech	5–6	4–2	3rd		
1979	Tennessee Tech	1–8–2	0–5–1	7th		
1980	Tennessee Tech	4–7	1–6	8th		
1981	Tennessee Tech	6–5	4–4	T–4th		
1982	Tennessee Tech	3–8	1–6	8th		
Tennessee Tech:		81–78–3	51–52–1			
Total:		81–78–3				
National championship Conference title Conference division title or championship game berth
