= 1973 Clemson Tigers football team =

American college football season

1973 Clemson Tigers football
- Conference: Atlantic Coast Conference
- Record: 5–6 (4–2 ACC)
- Head coach: Red Parker (1st season)
- Captains: Mike Buckner; Ken Pengitore
- Home stadium: Memorial Stadium

1973 Atlantic Coast Conference football standings
	Conf.					Overall
Team	W		L		T	W		L		T
No. 16 NC State $	6	–	0	–	0	9	–	3	–	0
No. 20 Maryland	5	–	1	–	0	8	–	4	–	0
Clemson	4	–	2	–	0	5	–	6	–	0
Virginia	3	–	3	–	0	4	–	7	–	0
Duke	1	–	4	–	1	2	–	8	–	1
North Carolina	1	–	5	–	0	4	–	7	–	0
Wake Forest	0	–	5	–	1	1	–	9	–	1
$ – Conference champion; Rankings from AP Poll

The 1973 Clemson Tigers football team was an American football team that represented Clemson University in the Atlantic Coast Conference (ACC) during the 1973 NCAA Division I football season. In its first season under head coach Red Parker, the team compiled a 5–6 record (4–2 against conference opponents), finished third in the ACC, and was outscored by a total of 263 to 231. The team played its home games at Memorial Stadium in Clemson, South Carolina.

Mike Buckner and quarterback Ken Pengitore were the team captains. The team's statistical leaders included Ken Pengitore with 1,370 passing yards, running back Smiley Sanders with 627 rushing yards and 60 point scored (10 touchdowns), and Gordy Bengel with 358 receiving yards.

== Schedule ==
Date	Time	Opponent	Site	Result	Attendance	Source
September 8	1:30 p.m.	The Citadel*	Memorial Stadium; Clemson, SC	W 14–12	40,000	
September 22	2:00 p.m.	at Georgia*	Sanford Stadium; Athens, GA (rivalry)	L 14–31	48,280	
September 29	2:00 p.m.	at Georgia Tech*	Grant Field; Atlanta, GA (rivalry)	L 21–29	48,062	
October 6	1:30 p.m.	Texas A&M*	Memorial Stadium; Clemson, SC	L 15–30	30,000	
October 13	1:30 p.m.	Virginia^{†}	Memorial Stadium; Clemson, SC	W 32–27	28,000	
October 20	1:30 p.m.	at Duke	Wallace Wade Stadium; Durham, NC	W 24–8	33,800	
October 27	1:30 p.m.	NC State	Memorial Stadium; Clemson, SC (rivalry)	L 6–29	34,000	
November 3	1:30 p.m.	Wake Forest	Memorial Stadium; Clemson, SC	W 35–8	23,000–25,000	
November 10	1:30 p.m.	at North Carolina	Kenan Memorial Stadium; Chapel Hill, NC	W 37–29	37,500	
November 17	1:30 p.m.	Maryland	Memorial Stadium; Clemson, SC	L 13–28	31,500	
November 24	1:30 p.m.	at South Carolina*	Williams–Brice Stadium; Columbia, SC (rivalry)	L 20–32	55,615	
*Non-conference game; ^{†}Homecoming; All times are in Eastern time
