= 1914 Richmond Spiders football team =

American college football season

1914 Richmond Spiders football

EVIAA champion
- Conference: Eastern Virginia Intercollegiate Athletic Association, South Atlantic Intercollegiate Athletic Association
- Record: 5–4 (5–1 EVIAA, 0–2 SAIAA)
- Head coach: Frank Dobson (2nd season)
- Captain: Newton R. Ancarrow
- Home stadium: Broad Street Park

1914 Eastern Virginia Intercollegiate Athletic Association football standings
	Conf.					Overall
Team	W		L		T	W		L		T
Richmond $	5	–	1	–	0	5	–	4	–	0
Randolph–Macon	3	–	3	–	0	5	–	5	–	0
Hampden–Sydney	3	–	3	–	0	3	–	7	–	1
William & Mary	1	–	5	–	0	1	–	7	–	0
$ – Conference champion

1914 South Atlantic Intercollegiate Athletic Association football standings
	Conf.					Overall
Team	W		L		T	W		L		T
Washington and Lee +	3	–	0	–	0	9	–	0	–	0
Virginia +	3	–	0	–	0	8	–	1	–	0
North Carolina	1	–	1	–	0	10	–	1	–	0
VPI	1	–	1	–	0	6	–	2	–	1
Georgetown	0	–	1	–	1	2	–	4	–	2
North Carolina A&M	0	–	2	–	1	3	–	3	–	1
St. John's (MD)	0	–	1	–	0	0	–	1	–	0
Johns Hopkins	0	–	1	–	0	2	–	5	–	1
Richmond	0	–	2	–	0	5	–	4	–	0
+ – Conference co-champions

The 1914 Richmond Spiders football team was an American football team that represented Richmond College—now known as the University of Richmond—as a member of the Eastern Virginia Intercollegiate Athletic Association (EVIAA) and the South Atlantic Intercollegiate Athletic Association (SAIAA) during the 1914 college football season. Led by second-year head coach Frank Dobson, Richmond finished the season 5–4 overall, 5–1 in EVIAA play, and 0–2 against SAIAA opponents. The Spiders won the EVIAA title for the second consecutive year.

== Schedule ==
Date	Time	Opponent	Site	Result	Source
September 26		at North Carolina	Campus Athletic Field; Chapel Hill, NC	L 0–41	
October 3		at VMI*	VMI Parade Ground; Lexington, VA (rivalry)	L 0–10	
October 10		at Virginia	Lambeth Field; Charlottesville, VA	L 0–62	
October 17		at Hampden–Sydney	Venable Field; Hampden Sydney, VA	W 26–9	
October 24		at William & Mary	Cary Field; Williamsburg, VA (rivalry)	W 7–3	
October 31		Randolph–Macon	Broad Street Park; Richmond, VA	L 8–13	
November 7		Hampden–Sydney	Broad Street Park; Richmond, VA	W 28–14	
November 21	2:30 p.m.	William & Mary	Broad Street Park; Richmond, VA	W 32–0	
November 28		Randolph–Macon	Broad Street Park; Richmond, VA	W 13–0	
*Non-conference game
