= 1914 William & Mary Orange and Black football team =

American college football season

1914 William & Mary Orange and Black football
- Conference: Eastern Virginia Intercollegiate Athletic Association
- Record: 1–7 (1–5 EVIAA)
- Head coach: Dexter W. Draper (2nd season)
- Captain: S. L. Bertschley

1914 Eastern Virginia Intercollegiate Athletic Association football standings
	Conf.					Overall
Team	W		L		T	W		L		T
Richmond $	5	–	1	–	0	5	–	4	–	0
Randolph–Macon	3	–	3	–	0	5	–	5	–	0
Hampden–Sydney	3	–	3	–	0	3	–	7	–	1
William & Mary	1	–	5	–	0	1	–	7	–	0
$ – Conference champion

The 1914 William & Mary Orange and Black football team represented the College of William & Mary as a member of the Eastern Virginia Intercollegiate Athletic Association (EVIAA) during the 1914 college football season. Led by second-year head coach Dexter W. Draper, William & Mary finished the season with an overall record of 1–7 and a mark of 1–5 in conference play, placing last out of four teams in the EVIAA.

== Schedule ==
Date	Time	Opponent	Site	Result	Source
October 3		Richmond Blues*	Williamsburg, VA	L 9–13	
October 10		at VMI*	VMI Parade Ground; Lexington, VA (rivalry)	L 0–38	
October 17		Randolph–Macon	Williamsburg, VA	W 10–7	
October 24		Richmond	Williamsburg, VA (rivalry)	L 3–7	
October 31		vs. Hampden–Sydney	Newport News, VA	L 0–19	
November 7		at Randolph–Macon	Ashland, VA	L 0–63	
November 14		Hampden–Sydney	Williamsburg, VA	L 0–41	
November 21	2:30 p.m.	at Richmond	Broad Street Park; Richmond, VA	L 0–32	
*Non-conference game
