= 1973 East Carolina Pirates football team =

American college football season

1973 East Carolina Pirates football

SoCon champion
- Conference: Southern Conference
- Record: 9–2 (7–0 SoCon)
- Head coach: Sonny Randle (3rd season)
- Offensive coordinator: Vito Ragazzo (3rd season)
- Home stadium: Ficklen Memorial Stadium

1973 Southern Conference football standings
	Conf.					Overall
Team	W		L		T	W		L		T
East Carolina $	7	–	0	–	0	9	–	2	–	0
Richmond	5	–	1	–	0	8	–	2	–	0
William & Mary	3	–	2	–	0	6	–	5	–	0
Furman	3	–	3	–	0	7	–	4	–	0
Appalachian State	2	–	2	–	0	3	–	7	–	1
VMI	2	–	4	–	0	2	–	9	–	0
Davidson	1	–	6	–	0	2	–	8	–	0
The Citadel	1	–	6	–	0	3	–	8	–	0
$ – Conference champion

The 1973 East Carolina Pirates football team was an American football team that represented East Carolina University as a member of the Southern Conference during the 1973 NCAA Division I football season. In their third season under head coach Sonny Randle, the team compiled a 9–2 record.

Frank Novak was the offensive coordinator in 1973

Carl Reese was the defensive coordinator in 1973

== Schedule ==
Date	Time	Opponent	Site	Result	Attendance	Source
September 8		at No. 17 NC State*	Carter Stadium; Raleigh, NC (rivalry)	L 8–57	45,500	
September 15		at Southern Miss*	Faulkner Field; Hattiesburg, MS	W 13–0	10,800	
September 22	8:30 p.m.	at Southern Illinois*	McAndrew Stadium; Carbondale, IL	W 42–25	6,500–9,500	
September 29		Furman	Ficklen Memorial Stadium; Greenville, NC	W 14–3	16,270	
October 6		at Davidson	Richardson Stadium; Davidson, NC	W 45–0	4,000	
October 13		VMI	Ficklen Memorial Stadium; Greenville, NC	W 42–7	14,550	
October 20		The Citadel	Johnson Hagood Stadium; Charleston, SC	W 34–0	13,300	
October 27		at North Carolina*	Kenan Memorial Stadium; Chapel Hill, NC	L 27–28	41,500	
November 3		William & Mary	Ficklen Memorial Stadium; Greenville, NC	W 34–3		
November 10		Richmond	Ficklen Memorial Stadium; Greenville, NC	W 44–14	21,251	
November 17		Appalachian State	Ficklen Memorial Stadium; Greenville, NC	W 49–14	14,182	
*Non-conference game; Rankings from AP Poll released prior to the game; All times are in Eastern time

== Roster ==
1973 East Carolina Pirates football team roster
Players			Coaches
Offense: Pos. / # / Name / Class; QB / 10 / Carl Summerell	Defense: Pos. / # / Name / Class	Special teams: Pos. / # / Name / Class	Head coach: Sonny Randle; Coordinators/assistant coaches Legend: (C) Team captain; (S) Suspended; (I) Ineligible; Injured; Redshirt
