= 1973 VMI Keydets football team =

American college football season

1973 VMI Keydets football
- Conference: Southern Conference
- Record: 3–8 (2–4 SoCon)
- Head coach: Bob Thalman (3rd season)
- Home stadium: Alumni Memorial Field

1973 Southern Conference football standings
	Conf.					Overall
Team	W		L		T	W		L		T
East Carolina $	7	–	0	–	0	9	–	2	–	0
Richmond	5	–	1	–	0	8	–	2	–	0
William & Mary	3	–	2	–	0	6	–	5	–	0
Furman	3	–	3	–	0	7	–	4	–	0
Appalachian State	2	–	2	–	0	3	–	7	–	1
VMI	2	–	4	–	0	2	–	9	–	0
Davidson	1	–	6	–	0	2	–	8	–	0
The Citadel	1	–	6	–	0	3	–	8	–	0
$ – Conference champion

The 1973 VMI Keydets football team was an American football team that represented the Virginia Military Institute (VMI) as a member of the Southern Conference (SoCon) during the 1973 NCAA Division I football season. In their third year under head coach Bob Thalman, the team compiled an overall record of 3–8 with a mark of 2–4 in conference play, placing sixth in the SoCon.

== Schedule ==
Date	Time	Opponent	Site	Result	Attendance	Source
September 8		at Virginia*	Scott Stadium; Charlottesville, VA	L 0–16	21,000	
September 15	1:30 p.m.	Navy*	Alumni Memorial Field; Lexington, VA	L 6–37	10,000	
September 22		at Richmond	City Stadium; Richmond, VA (rivalry)	L 0–35	11,687	
September 29		at Tulane*	Tulane Stadium; New Orleans, LA	L 0–42	25,037	
October 6		The Citadel	Alumni Memorial Stadium; Lexington, VA (rivalry)	W 23–6	6,750	
October 13		at East Carolina	Ficklen Memorial Stadium; Greenville, NC	L 7–42	14,550	
October 20		at Furman	Sirrine Stadium; Greenville, SC	L 13–19	10,000	
October 27		at William & Mary	Cary Field; Williamsburg, VA (rivalry)	L 14–45	9,500	
November 3		Davidson	Alumni Memorial Field; Lexington, VA	W 24–17	5,600	
November 10		at Georgia Tech*	Grant Field; Atlanta, GA	L 7–36	38,112	
November 17		at Virginia Tech*	Lane Stadium; Blacksburg, VA (rivalry)	W 22–21	23,000	
*Non-conference game; All times are in Eastern time
