= 1973 Chattanooga Moccasins football team =

American college football season

1973 Chattanooga Moccasins football
- Conference: Independent
- Record: 4–7
- Head coach: Joe Morrison (1st season)
- Home stadium: Chamberlain Field

1973 NCAA Division II independents football records
| | Conf. | | | Overall |
| Team | W | L | T | W | | L | | T |
|---|---|---|---|---|---|---|---|---|
| No. 1 Tennessee State | | – | | 10 | – | 0 | – | 0 |
| No. 9 Hawaii | | – | | 9 | – | 2 | – | 0 |
| Nebraska–Omaha | | – | | 7 | – | 2 | – | 1 |
| Trinity (TX) | | – | | 8 | – | 3 | – | 0 |
| UNLV | | – | | 8 | – | 3 | – | 0 |
| No. 13 Delaware ^ | | – | | 8 | – | 4 | – | 0 |
| Western Carolina | | – | | 6 | – | 3 | – | 1 |
| Central Michigan | | – | | 7 | – | 4 | – | 0 |
| Nevada | | – | | 7 | – | 4 | – | 0 |
| Western Illinois | | – | | 7 | – | 4 | – | 0 |
| Milwaukee | | – | | 6 | – | 4 | – | 1 |
| Eastern Michigan | | – | | 6 | – | 4 | – | 0 |
| American International | | – | | 5 | – | 4 | – | 0 |
| Akron | | – | | 6 | – | 5 | – | 0 |
| Central State (OH) | | – | | 6 | – | 5 | – | 0 |
| Ball State | | – | | 5 | – | 5 | – | 1 |
| Wayne State (MI) | | – | | 5 | – | 5 | – | 0 |
| Drexel | | – | | 4 | – | 4 | – | 0 |
| Bucknell | | – | | 3 | – | 4 | – | 2 |
| Northeast Louisiana | | – | | 3 | – | 5 | – | 2 |
| Santa Clara | | – | | 4 | – | 6 | – | 0 |
| Youngstown State | | – | | 4 | – | 6 | – | 0 |
| Arkansas–Pine Bluff | | – | | 3 | – | 5 | – | 1 |
| Chattanooga | | – | | 4 | – | 7 | – | 0 |
| Indiana State | | – | | 4 | – | 7 | – | 0 |
| Northeastern | | – | | 3 | – | 6 | – | 0 |
| Kentucky State | | – | | 3 | – | 8 | – | 0 |
| Northern Michigan | | – | | 2 | – | 7 | – | 1 |
| Illinois College | | – | | 2 | – | 7 | – | 0 |
| Eastern Illinois | | – | | 2 | – | 9 | – | 0 |
| Portland State | | – | | 1 | – | 10 | – | 0 |
^ – NCAA Division II playoff participant; Rankings from AP small college poll

The 1973 Chattanooga Moccasins football team was an American football team that represented the University of Tennessee at Chattanooga during the 1973 NCAA Division II football season. In their first year under head coach Joe Morrison, the team compiled a 4–7 record.

== Schedule ==
| Date | Time | Opponent | Site | Result | Attendance | Source |
|---|---|---|---|---|---|---|
| September 8 | | at Eastern Kentucky | Hanger Field; Richmond, KY | L 6–10 | 13,750 | |
| September 15 | | at Vanderbilt | Dudley Field; Nashville, TN | L 12–14 | 23,600 | |
| September 22 | | at Auburn | Cliff Hare Stadium; Auburn, AL | L 0–31 | 46,500 | |
| September 29 | | at Southwestern Louisiana | Cajun Field; Lafayette, LA | W 21–10 | 11,500 | |
| October 6 | | Southern Miss^{†} | Chamberlain Field; Chattanooga, TN | L 7–42 | 9,127 | |
| October 13 | | at The Citadel | Johnson Hagood Stadium; Charleston, SC | L 20–28 | 10,120 | |
| October 20 | | Western Carolina | Chamberlain Field; Chattanooga, TN | L 0–14 | 5,244 | |
| October 27 | | Tennessee Tech | Chamberlain Field; Chattanooga, TN | W 7–3 | 3,747 | |
| November 3 | | No. 1 Tennessee State | Chamberlain Field; Chattanooga, TN | L 7–44 | 11,524 | |
| November 17 | 7:34 p.m. | at Tampa | Tampa Stadium; Tampa, FL | W 25–24 | 20,270 | |
| November 24 | | East Tennessee State | Chamberlain Field; Chattanooga, TN | W 26–21 | 3,223 | |
^{†}Homecoming; Rankings from AP Poll released prior to the game; All times are in Eastern time
