= 1973 Appalachian State Mountaineers football team =

American college football season

1973 Appalachian State Mountaineers football
- Conference: Southern Conference
- Record: 3–7–1 (2–2 SoCon)
- Head coach: Jim Brakefield (3rd season)
- Home stadium: Conrad Stadium

1973 Southern Conference football standings
	Conf.					Overall
Team	W		L		T	W		L		T
East Carolina $	7	–	0	–	0	9	–	2	–	0
Richmond	5	–	1	–	0	8	–	2	–	0
William & Mary	3	–	2	–	0	6	–	5	–	0
Furman	3	–	3	–	0	7	–	4	–	0
Appalachian State	2	–	2	–	0	3	–	7	–	1
VMI	2	–	4	–	0	2	–	9	–	0
Davidson	1	–	6	–	0	2	–	8	–	0
The Citadel	1	–	6	–	0	3	–	8	–	0
$ – Conference champion

The 1973 Appalachian State Mountaineers football team was an American football team that represented Appalachian State University as a member of the Southern Conference (SoCon) during the 1973 NCAA Division I football season. In their third year under head coach Jim Brakefield, the Mountaineers compiled an overall record of 3–7–1 with a mark of 2–2 in conference play, and finished fifth in the SoCon.

== Schedule ==
Date	Opponent	Site	Result	Attendance	Source
September 8	Western Kentucky*	Conrad Stadium; Boone, NC	L 7–42	8,250	
September 15	at Furman	Sirrine Stadium; Greenville, SC	L 0–17	15,000	
September 22	at Western Carolina*	Whitmire Stadium; Cullowhee, NC (rivalry)	L 14–23	9,200	
September 29	Davidson	Conrad Stadium; Boone, NC	W 24–8	10,650	
October 6	Lenoir Rhyne*	Conrad Stadium; Boone, NC	T 14–14	8,100	
October 13	at East Tennessee State*	Memorial Stadium; Johnson City, TN	L 11–19	8,152	
October 20	Wofford*	Conrad Stadium; Boone, NC	W 28–21	5,500	
October 27	The Citadel	Conrad Stadium; Boone, NC	W 31–6	7,855	
November 3	at Florence State*	Braly Municipal Stadium; Florence, AL	L 7–21	5,500	
November 10	at South Carolina*	Williams–Brice Stadium; Columbia, SC	L 14–35	33,705	
November 17	at East Carolina	Ficklen Memorial Stadium; Greenville, NC	L 14–49	14,182	
*Non-conference game
