= 1973 Middle Tennessee Blue Raiders football team =

American college football season

1973 Middle Tennessee Blue Raiders football
- Conference: Ohio Valley Conference
- Record: 4–7 (3–4 OVC)
- Head coach: Bill Peck (4th season)
- Captains: J. Pelt; Ed Witherspoon
- Home stadium: Horace Jones Field

1973 Ohio Valley Conference football standings
	Conf.					Overall
Team	W		L		T	W		L		T
No. 3 Western Kentucky $^	7	–	0	–	0	12	–	1	–	0
Murray State	5	–	2	–	0	7	–	3	–	0
Eastern Kentucky	4	–	3	–	0	7	–	4	–	0
Morehead State	4	–	3	–	0	6	–	5	–	0
East Tennessee State	3	–	4	–	0	4	–	7	–	0
Middle Tennessee	3	–	4	–	0	4	–	7	–	0
Tennessee Tech	1	–	6	–	0	2	–	8	–	1
Austin Peay	1	–	6	–	0	2	–	8	–	0
$ – Conference champion; ^ – NCAA Division II playoff participant; Rankings from AP small college poll

The 1973 Middle Tennessee Blue Raiders football team represented Middle Tennessee State University—as a member of the Ohio Valley Conference (OVC) during the 1973 NCAA Division II football season. Led by fourth-year head coach Bill Peck, the Blue Raiders compiled a record an overall record of 4–7 with a mark of 3–4 in conference play, tying for fifth place in the OVC. The team's captains were J. Pelt and Ed Witherspoon.

== Schedule ==
Date	Opponent	Site	Result	Attendance	Source
September 8	vs. Tennessee State*	Dudley Field; Nashville, TN	L 0–23	22,000–27,000	
September 15	at Tennessee–Martin*	Pacer Stadium; Martin, TN	W 7–0	6,000	
September 22	at Morehead State	Jayne Stadium; Morehead, KY	L 22–28	8,000	
September 29	Western Carolina*	Horace Jones Field; Murfreesboro, TN	L 7–24	6,500	
October 6	Eastern Kentucky	Horace Jones Field; Murfreesboro, TN	L 28–29	6,500	
October 13	Murray State	Horace Jones Field; Murfreesboro, TN	W 17–14	3,500	
October 20	at Austin Peay	Clarksville Municipal Stadium; Clarksville, TN	W 23–20	6,800	
October 27	at Ball State*	Ball State Stadium; Muncie, IN	L 3–34	5,350	
November 3	No. 3 Western Kentucky	Horace Jones Field; Murfreesboro, TN (rivalry)	L 8–42	10,000	
November 10	at East Tennessee State	Memorial Stadium; Johnson City, TN	L 16–40	3,821	
November 17	Tennessee Tech	Horace Jones Field; Murfreesboro, TN	W 17–10	7,000	
*Non-conference game; Rankings from AP Poll released prior to the game
