= 1973 Davidson Wildcats football team =

American college football season

1973 Davidson Wildcats football
- Conference: Southern Conference
- Record: 2–8 (1–6 SoCon)
- Head coach: Dave Fagg (4th season)
- Home stadium: Richardson Stadium

1973 Southern Conference football standings
	Conf.					Overall
Team	W		L		T	W		L		T
East Carolina $	7	–	0	–	0	9	–	2	–	0
Richmond	5	–	1	–	0	8	–	2	–	0
William & Mary	3	–	2	–	0	6	–	5	–	0
Furman	3	–	3	–	0	7	–	4	–	0
Appalachian State	2	–	2	–	0	3	–	7	–	1
VMI	2	–	4	–	0	2	–	9	–	0
Davidson	1	–	6	–	0	2	–	8	–	0
The Citadel	1	–	6	–	0	3	–	8	–	0
$ – Conference champion

The 1973 Davidson Wildcats football team represented Davidson College as a member of the Southern Conference (SoCon) during the 1973 NCAA Division I football season. Led by fourth-year head coach Dave Fagg, the Wildcats compiled an overall record of 2–8 with a mark of 1–6 in conference play, tying for seventh place in the SoCon.

== Schedule ==
Date	Time	Opponent	Site	Result	Attendance	Source
September 8		vs. Wofford*	North Mecklenburg H.S. Stadium; Huntersville, NC	L 0–23	4,616	
September 15		Richmond	Richardson Stadium; Davidson, NC	L 0–42	3,000	
September 22		Lenoir–Rhyne*	Richardson Stadium; Davidson, NC	W 20–17	6,000	
September 29		at Appalachian State	Conrad Stadium; Boone, NC	L 8–24	10,650	
October 6		East Carolina^{†}	Richardson Stadium; Davidson, NC	L 0–45	4,000	
October 13		at Furman	Sirrine Stadium; Greenville, SC	L 7–38		
October 20		at William & Mary	Cary Field; Williamsburg, VA	L 35–51	13,500	
October 27	3:33 p.m.	at Air Force*	Falcon Stadium; Colorado Springs, CO	L 19–41	34,682	
November 3		at VMI	Alumni Memorial Field; Lexington, VA	L 17–24	5,600	
November 17		at The Citadel	Johnson Hagood Stadium; Charleston, SC	W 19–16		
*Non-conference game; ^{†}Homecoming; All times are in Eastern time
