= 1973 NC State Wolfpack football team =

American college football season

1973 NC State Wolfpack football

ACC champion Liberty Bowl champion

Liberty Bowl, W 31–18 vs. Kansas
- Conference: Atlantic Coast Conference

Ranking
- AP: No. 16
- Record: 9–3 (6–0 ACC)
- Head coach: Lou Holtz (2nd season)
- Offensive coordinator: Brian Burke (2nd season)
- Home stadium: Carter Stadium

1973 Atlantic Coast Conference football standings
	Conf.					Overall
Team	W		L		T	W		L		T
No. 16 NC State $	6	–	0	–	0	9	–	3	–	0
No. 20 Maryland	5	–	1	–	0	8	–	4	–	0
Clemson	4	–	2	–	0	5	–	6	–	0
Virginia	3	–	3	–	0	4	–	7	–	0
Duke	1	–	4	–	1	2	–	8	–	1
North Carolina	1	–	5	–	0	4	–	7	–	0
Wake Forest	0	–	5	–	1	1	–	9	–	1
$ – Conference champion; Rankings from AP Poll

The 1973 NC State Wolfpack football team represented North Carolina State University during the 1973 NCAA Division I football season. The Wolfpack were led by second-year head coach Lou Holtz and played their home games at Carter Stadium in Raleigh, North Carolina. They competed as members of the Atlantic Coast Conference, winning the conference with a perfect 6–0 record. The Wolfpack were invited to the 1973 Liberty Bowl, where they defeated Kansas.

== Schedule ==
Date	Opponent	Rank	Site	Result	Attendance	Source
September 8	East Carolina*	No. 17	Carter Stadium; Raleigh, NC (rivalry)	W 57–8	45,500	
September 15	Virginia	No. 17	Carter Stadium; Raleigh, NC	W 43–23	36,200	
September 22	at No. 2 Nebraska*	No. 14	Memorial Stadium; Lincoln, NE	L 14–31	75,925	
September 29	at Georgia*	No. 19	Sanford Stadium; Athens, GA	L 12–31	52,700	
October 6	North Carolina		Carter Stadium; Raleigh, NC (rivalry)	W 28–26	50,200	
October 13	Maryland		Carter Stadium; Raleigh, NC	W 24–22	39,200	
October 27	at Clemson		Memorial Stadium; Clemson, SC (rivalry)	W 29–6	34,000	
November 3	at South Carolina*		Williams–Brice Stadium; Columbia, SC	W 56–35	52,320	
November 10	at No. 6 Penn State*		Beaver Stadium; University Park, PA	L 29–35	59,184–59,424	
November 17	at Duke	No. 20	Wallace Wade Stadium; Durham, NC (rivalry)	W 21–3	40,380	
November 24	Wake Forest	No. 16	Carter Stadium; Raleigh, NC (rivalry)	W 52–13	31,100	
December 17	vs. No. 19 Kansas*	No. 16	Memphis Memorial Stadium; Memphis, TN (Liberty Bowl)	W 31–18	50,011	
*Non-conference game; Rankings from AP Poll released prior to the game
