= 1973 Duke Blue Devils football team =

American college football season

1973 Duke Blue Devils football
- Conference: Atlantic Coast Conference
- Record: 2–8–1 (1–4–1 ACC)
- Head coach: Mike McGee (3rd season)
- Defensive coordinator: Jerry McGee (2nd season)
- MVP: Keith Stoneback
- Captains: Mark Johnson; John Ricca; Keith Stoneback
- Home stadium: Wallace Wade Stadium

1973 Atlantic Coast Conference football standings
	Conf.					Overall
Team	W		L		T	W		L		T
No. 16 NC State $	6	–	0	–	0	9	–	3	–	0
No. 20 Maryland	5	–	1	–	0	8	–	4	–	0
Clemson	4	–	2	–	0	5	–	6	–	0
Virginia	3	–	3	–	0	4	–	7	–	0
Duke	1	–	4	–	1	2	–	8	–	1
North Carolina	1	–	5	–	0	4	–	7	–	0
Wake Forest	0	–	5	–	1	1	–	9	–	1
$ – Conference champion; Rankings from AP Poll

The 1973 Duke Blue Devils football team was an American football team that represented Duke University as a member of the Atlantic Coast Conference (ACC) during the 1973 NCAA Division I football season. In their third year under head coach Mike McGee, the Blue Devils compiled an overall record of 2–8–1, with a conference record of 1–4–1, and finished fifth in the ACC.

== Schedule ==
Date	Opponent	Site	Result	Attendance	Source
September 15	at No. 9 Tennessee*	Neyland Stadium; Knoxville, TN	L 17–21	70,787	
September 22	Washington*	Wallace Wade Stadium; Durham, NC	W 23–21	22,500	
September 29	at Virginia	Scott Stadium; Charlottesville, VA	L 3–7	20,300	
October 6	at Purdue*	Ross–Ade Stadium; West Lafayette, IN	L 7–27	53,241	
October 13	No. 18 Tulane*^{†}	Wallace Wade Stadium; Durham, NC	L 17–24	20,500	
October 20	Clemson	Wallace Wade Stadium; Durham, NC	L 8–24	33,800	
October 27	vs. Maryland	Foreman Field; Norfolk, VA (Oyster Bowl)	L 10–30	20,500	
November 3	at Georgia Tech*	Grant Field; Atlanta, GA	L 10–12	47,129	
November 10	at Wake Forest	Groves Stadium; Winston-Salem, NC (rivalry)	T 7–7	20,500	
November 17	No. 20 NC State	Wallace Wade Stadium; Durham, NC (rivalry)	L 3–21	40,380	
November 24	North Carolina	Wallace Wade Stadium; Durham, NC (Victory Bell)	W 27–10	44,600	
*Non-conference game; ^{†}Homecoming; Rankings from AP Poll released prior to the game
