= 1914 VPI Gobblers football team =

American college football season

1914 VPI Gobblers football
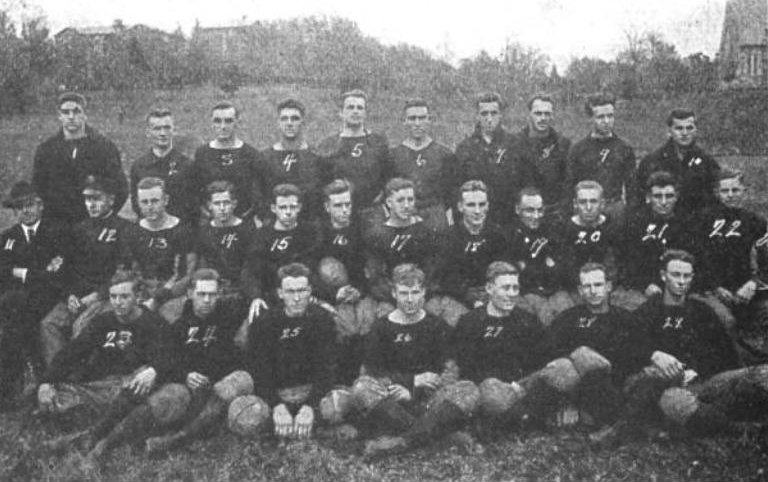
- Conference: South Atlantic Intercollegiate Athletic Association
- Record: 6–2–1 (1–1 SAIAA)
- Head coach: Branch Bocock (5th season)
- Captain: Millard Fillmore Peake
- Home stadium: Miles Field

1914 South Atlantic Intercollegiate Athletic Association football standings
	Conf.					Overall
Team	W		L		T	W		L		T
Washington and Lee +	3	–	0	–	0	9	–	0	–	0
Virginia +	3	–	0	–	0	8	–	1	–	0
North Carolina	1	–	1	–	0	10	–	1	–	0
VPI	1	–	1	–	0	6	–	2	–	1
Georgetown	0	–	1	–	1	2	–	4	–	2
North Carolina A&M	0	–	2	–	1	3	–	3	–	1
St. John's (MD)	0	–	1	–	0	0	–	1	–	0
Johns Hopkins	0	–	1	–	0	2	–	5	–	1
Richmond	0	–	2	–	0	5	–	4	–	0
+ – Conference co-champions

The 1914 VPI Gobblers football team represented Virginia Agricultural and Mechanical College and Polytechnic Institute in the 1914 college football season. The team was led by their head coach Branch Bocock and finished with a record of six wins, two losses and one tie (6–2–1).

== Schedule ==
Date	Time	Opponent	Site	Result	Attendance	Source
September 26		King*	Miles Field; Blacksburg, VA	W 35–0		
October 3		Randolph–Macon*	Miles Field; Blacksburg, VA	W 13–0		
October 10		Hampden–Sydney*	Miles Field; Blacksburg, VA	W 22–0		
October 17		vs. West Virginia Wesleyan*	Charleston, WV	L 0–13		
October 24		Roanoke*	Miles Field; Blacksburg, VA	T 7–7		
October 31	3:00 p.m.	vs. Washington and Lee	Fair Grounds; Roanoke, VA	L 6–7	5,000	
November 7		Marshall*	Miles Field; Blacksburg, VA	W 54–6		
November 14	3:00 p.m.	vs. North Carolina A&M	Fair Grounds; Roanoke, VA	W 3–0	400	
November 26	3:00 p.m.	vs. VMI*	Fair Grounds; Roanoke, VA (rivalry)	W 3–0	5,000-7,000	
*Non-conference game

== Before the season ==
The 1913 VPI Gobblers football team compiled a 7–1–1 record and were led by Branch Bocock in his fourth season as head coach.

== Game summaries ==
=== King ===
VPI's first game of the season was a victory over King at Miles Field.

The starting lineup for VPI was: Taylor (left end), Whitehead (left tackle), Montague (left guard), Savage (center), Benedict (right guard), Caffee (right tackle), Rives (right end), Peake (quarterback), Huddle (left halfback), Davis (right halfback), Sanders (fullback). The substitutes were: Engleby, Harvey, Henderson, Macon, Moore, Robertson, Treakle and Vaughan-Lloyd.

The starting lineup for King was: George King (left end), Smith (left tackle), Newland (left guard), Wood (center), Graham (right guard), Kincaid (right tackle), Lee (right end), Burrows (quarterback), Caldwell (left halfback), Fain (right halfback), Davidson (fullback).

=== Randolph–Macon ===
After their victory over King, VPI played Randolph–Macon College at Miles Field.

=== Hampden–Sydney ===
Hampden–Sydney vs. VPI

Team	1	2	3	4	Total
HS	0	0	0	0	0
• VPI	7	6	0	9	22

- Date: October 10, 1914
- Location: Miles Field
  Blacksburg, VA

The starting lineup for VPI was: Rives (left end), Oppenheimer (left tackle), Benedict (left guard), Montague (center), Williams (right guard), Caffee (right tackle), Cottrell (right end), Peake (quarterback), Funkhouser (left halfback), Moore (right halfback), Sanders (fullback). The substitutes were: Davis, Engleby, Gregory, Harvey, Huddle, Macon, Savage, Somerville, Taylor, Treakle and Vaughan-Lloyd.

The starting lineup for Hampden–Sydney was: P. C. Adams (left end), Robert Guthrie (left tackle), Robert Warwick (left guard), Marvin Bowling (center), R. B. Thompson (right guard), John Shackelford (right tackle), Frank Massie (right end), Walter Thurman (quarterback), A. B. Driver (left halfback), Peyton Palmore (right halfback), Perkins (fullback).

=== West Virginia Wesleyan ===
The starting lineup for VPI was: Taylor (left end), Benedict (left tackle), Oppenheimer (left guard), Savage (center), Treakle (right guard), Caffee (right tackle), Powell (right end), Peake (quarterback), Dixon (left halfback), Moore (right halfback), Sanders (fullback). The substitutes were: Funkhouser, Gregory, Macon, Montague, Rives and Somerville.

The starting lineup for West Virginia Wesleyan was: W. Guy Morrison (left end), Herbert Withers (left tackle), Everett Morgan (left guard), William Singleton (center), Harry Vance (right guard), John Kellison (right tackle), James Heavener (right end), Harry Stansbury (quarterback), O. Shumaker (left halfback), R. Worth Shumaker (right halfback), William Jacobs (fullback). The substitutes were: Charles Allen and Bobbitt.

=== Roanoke ===
Roanoke vs. VPI

Team	1	2	3	4	Total
Roanoke	0	7	0	0	7
VPI	0	7	0	0	7

- Date: October 24, 1914
- Location: Miles Field
  Blacksburg, VA
- Game weather: "slippery"
- Referee: Miles

The starting lineup for VPI was: Taylor (left end), Moore (left tackle), Benedict (left guard), Montague (center), Treakle (right guard), Caffee (right tackle), Franklin (right end), Peake (quarterback), Dixon (left halfback), Funkhouser (right halfback), Huddle (fullback). The substitutes were: Cottrell, Engleby, Harvey, Macon, Perry, Rives, Sanders, Somerville and Vaughan-Lloyd.

The starting lineup for Roanoke was: C. W. Deitrich (left end), Sam Bonham (left tackle), Joseph Roe (left guard), Daniel O'Flaherty (center), William Killinger (right guard), Reid Duncan (right tackle), Harmon (right end), Douglas Bunting (quarterback), G. S. Hoffman (left halfback), M. W. Krieger (right halfback), James Bonham (fullback).

=== Washington and Lee ===
Washington & Lee vs. VPI

Team	1	2	3	4	Total
• W&L	0	7	0	0	7
VPI	6	0	0	0	6

- Date: October 31, 1914
- Location: Fair Grounds
  Roanoke, VA
- Game start: 3:00 p.m.
- Game attendance: 5,000
- Referee: Jack Gass

The starting lineup for VPI was: Taylor (left end), Caffee (left tackle), Cottrell (left guard), Montague (center), Williams (right guard), Benedict (right tackle), Vaughan-Lloyd (right end), Peake (quarterback), Macon (left halfback), Huddle (right halfback), Sanders (fullback). The substitutes were: Dixon, Engleby, Funkhouser, Graves, Gregory, Henderson, Moore, Oppenheimer, Rives and Somerville.

The starting lineup for Washington and Lee was: I. R. Simms (left end), Ted Shultz (left tackle), B. D. Bryan (left guard), Al Pierotti (center), F. B. Scarry (right guard), Buck Miles (right tackle), John Harrison (right end), John Gallagher (quarterback), Harry "Cy" Young (left halfback), Fred Sweetland (right halfback), Raymond Beuhring (fullback). The substitutes were: M. S. Barrow, F. M. Dingwall, Edward Donahue, Joseph Milner, W. K. Seeley and William Smith.

=== Marshall ===
The starting lineup for VPI was: Taylor (left end), Benedict (left tackle), Moore (left guard), Henderson (center), Treakle (right guard), Caffee (right tackle), Tyree (right end), Terry (quarterback), Davis (left halfback), Funkhouser (right halfback), Sanders (fullback). The substitutes were: Campbell, Cottrell, Dixon, Engleby, Gregory, Harvey, Hill, Huddle, Logan, Macon, Oppenheimer, Rives, Vaughan-Lloyd and Williams.

The starting lineup for Marshall was: Yeater (left end), Lee Bonar (left tackle), William "Benny" Shepherd (left guard), Jesse Callahan (center), Andrew Groves (right guard), Clinton Ramsey (right tackle), William Miller (right end), William Nagle (quarterback), Edgar Reeser (left halfback), William Cundiff (right halfback), Everett Lawrence (fullback).

=== North Carolina A&M ===
North Carolina A&M vs. VPI

Team	1	2	3	4	Total
NC A&M	0	0	0	0	0
• VPI	0	0	3	0	3

- Date: November 14, 1914
- Location: Fair Grounds
  Roanoke, VA
- Game start: 3:00 p.m.
- Game attendance: 400
- Game weather: "soaking rain"
- Referee: Jack Gass

The starting lineup for VPI was: Rives (left end), A. P. Moore (left tackle), Williams (left guard), Henderson (center), A. B. Moore (right guard), Benedict (right tackle), Franklin (right end), Peake (quarterback), Funkhouser (left halfback), Macon (right halfback), Sanders (fullback). The substitutes were: Dixon, Harvey, Oppenheimer and Terry.

The starting lineup for North Carolina A&M was: J. E. McDougall (left end), Herman Winston (left tackle), Charles Proffitt (left guard), R. A. Plyler (center), R. C. Young (right guard), C. C. Cooke (right tackle), Clem Seifert (right end), C. E. Van Brocklin (quarterback), Wallace Riddick (left halfback), W.F. Townsend (right halfback), P. G. Tenney (fullback). The substitutes were: J. V. Champion and N. S. Sharp.

=== VMI ===
VMI vs. VPI

Team	1	2	3	4	Total
VMI	0	0	0	0	0
• VPI	0	0	0	3	3

- Date: November 26, 1914
- Location: Fair Grounds
  Roanoke, VA
- Game start: 3:00 p.m.
- Game attendance: 5,000-7,000
- Game weather: "ideal"
- Referee: Land (Navy)

The starting lineup for VPI was: Taylor (left end), Benedict (left tackle), Moore (left guard), Henderson (center), Williams (right guard), Caffee (right tackle), Franklin (right end), Peake (quarterback), Dixon (left halfback), Funkhouser (right halfback), Sanders (fullback). The substitutes were: Gregory, Harvey, Huddle, Macon, Rives and Terry.

The starting lineup for VMI was: Thomas Arms (left end), John Pitts (left tackle), Vernon Somers (left guard), Oscar Beasley (center), Claude Cammer (right guard), McCormick (right tackle), Nathaniel Massie (right end), James Nelms (quarterback), Andrew Holderby (left halfback), James Bain (right halfback), Laurence Oakes (fullback). The substitutes were: Carlos Fetterolf, Mose Goodman, Sterling Heflin, Winfred Kidd, Peyton Marshall and William Speed.

== Players ==
The following players were members of the 1914 football team according to the roster published in the 1915 edition of The Bugle, the Virginia Tech yearbook.

VPI 1914 roster
Quarterback: Millard Fillmore Peake (Capt.); Guards: Arthur Penick Moore; George Ellsworth Treakle; Tackles: Loyal Clark Benedict; John Staub Caffee; Centers: Robert Ashby Henderson; James Lewis Montague	Ends: James Atkins Gregory; James Franklin Powell; Thomas McDowell Rives; Franklin Minor Taylor; Nathan Louis Tyree; Halfbacks: Vincent Bargmant Dixon; Edward Kramer Funkhouser; David Nicholas Huddle; Fullback: William Frederick Sanders	Substitutes: Paxton Stuart Campbell; Benjamin Cottrell; Roland Legard Davis; Frank Allison Engleby; Richard Harvey; S. L. Huffman; Edward Vaughan-Lloyd; Charles Lewter Logan; David Conway Macon; Arthur Blakie Moore; Otto Phelps Oppenheimer; George Selben Somerville; Arthur Palfrey Terry; Samuel Jack Williams

== Coaching and training staff ==
- Head coach: Branch Bocock
- Manager: Clifford A. Cutchins
