= 1973 North Carolina Tar Heels football team =

American college football season

1973 North Carolina Tar Heels football
- Conference: Atlantic Coast Conference
- Record: 4–7 (1–5 ACC)
- Head coach: Bill Dooley (7th season)
- Captains: Sammy Johnson; Terry Taylor
- Home stadium: Kenan Memorial Stadium

1973 Atlantic Coast Conference football standings
	Conf.					Overall
Team	W		L		T	W		L		T
No. 16 NC State $	6	–	0	–	0	9	–	3	–	0
No. 20 Maryland	5	–	1	–	0	8	–	4	–	0
Clemson	4	–	2	–	0	5	–	6	–	0
Virginia	3	–	3	–	0	4	–	7	–	0
Duke	1	–	4	–	1	2	–	8	–	1
North Carolina	1	–	5	–	0	4	–	7	–	0
Wake Forest	0	–	5	–	1	1	–	9	–	1
$ – Conference champion; Rankings from AP Poll

The 1973 North Carolina Tar Heels football team represented the University of North Carolina at Chapel Hill during the 1973 NCAA Division I football season. The Tar Heels were led by seventh-year head coach Bill Dooley and played their home games at Kenan Memorial Stadium in Chapel Hill, North Carolina. They competed as members of the Atlantic Coast Conference, finishing in sixth.

== Schedule ==
Date	Time	Opponent	Rank	Site	Result	Attendance	Source
September 15	1:30 p.m.	William & Mary*	No. 19	Kenan Memorial Stadium; Chapel Hill, NC	W 34–27	33,500	
September 22	1:30 p.m.	Maryland		Kenan Memorial Stadium; Chapel Hill, NC	L 3–23	37,500	
September 29	1:30 p.m.	No. 20 Missouri*		Kenan Memorial Stadium; Chapel Hill, NC	L 14–27	40,500	
October 6	1:30 p.m.	at NC State		Carter Stadium; Raleigh, NC (rivalry)	L 26–28	50,200	
October 13	8:00 p.m.	at Kentucky*		Commonwealth Stadium; Lexington, KY	W 16–10	51,500	
October 20	7:30 p.m.	at No. 17 Tulane*		Tulane Stadium; New Orleans, LA	L 0–16	38,502	
October 27	1:30 p.m.	East Carolina*		Kenan Memorial Stadium; Chapel Hill, NC	W 28–27	41,500	
November 3	1:30 p.m.	at Virginia		Scott Stadium; Charlottesville, VA (South's Oldest Rivalry)	L 40–44	23,500	
November 10	1:30 p.m.	Clemson		Kenan Memorial Stadium; Chapel Hill, NC	L 29–37	37,500	
November 17	1:30 p.m.	Wake Forest		Kenan Memorial Stadium; Chapel Hill, NC (rivalry)	W 42–0	37,500	
November 24	1:30 p.m.	at Duke		Wallace Wade Stadium; Durham, NC (Victory Bell)	L 10–27	44,600	
*Non-conference game; Rankings from AP Poll released prior to the game; All times are in Eastern time
