= 1973 Western Kentucky Hilltoppers football team =

American college football season

1973 Western Kentucky Hilltoppers football

OVC champion Grantland Rice Bowl Champion

Camellia Bowl, L 0–34 vs. Louisiana Tech
- Conference: Ohio Valley Conference

Ranking
- AP: No. 3
- Record: 12–1 (7–0 OVC)
- Head coach: Jimmy Feix (6th season)
- Home stadium: L. T. Smith Stadium

1973 Ohio Valley Conference football standings
	Conf.					Overall
Team	W		L		T	W		L		T
No. 3 Western Kentucky $^	7	–	0	–	0	12	–	1	–	0
Murray State	5	–	2	–	0	7	–	3	–	0
Eastern Kentucky	4	–	3	–	0	7	–	4	–	0
Morehead State	4	–	3	–	0	6	–	5	–	0
East Tennessee State	3	–	4	–	0	4	–	7	–	0
Middle Tennessee	3	–	4	–	0	4	–	7	–	0
Tennessee Tech	1	–	6	–	0	2	–	8	–	1
Austin Peay	1	–	6	–	0	2	–	8	–	0
$ – Conference champion; ^ – NCAA Division II playoff participant; Rankings from AP small college poll

The 1973 Western Kentucky football team represented Western Kentucky University during the inaugural 1973 NCAA Division II football season. The team came off an 7–3 record from the prior season and was led by coach Jimmy Feix. They finished the regular season undefeated and won the Ohio Valley Conference championship. The Hilltoppers made the initial NCAA Division II Football Championship, winning their first two playoff games, including a win over Grambling in the Grantland Rice Bowl, before falling in the championship game to Louisiana Tech in the Camellia Bowl. Their rankings in the final polls were UPI 2 and AP 3.

This team was one of the best in school history, set a school record for victories, and finished ranked 1st in NCAA Division II in Scoring Offense. The roster included future NFL players Virgil Livers, John Bushong, David Carter, Rick Caswell, Clarence “Jazz” Jackson, and Mike McCoy. Porter Williams and David Nollner were named to All American teams, Lonnie Schuster was named OVC Defensive Player of the Year, and Feix OVC Coach of the Year. The All OVC team included Bushong, Jackson, Charlie Johnson, McCoy, Bob Morehead, Nollner, Schuster, Aundra Skiles, and Williams. The coaching staff included future NFL coach Romeo Crennel.

== Schedule ==
Date	Opponent	Rank	Site	Result	Attendance	Source
September 8	at Appalachian State*		Conrad Stadium; Boone, NC	W 42–7	8,250	
September 22	at Austin Peay		Municipal Stadium; Clarksville, TN	W 28–0	7,000	
September 29	East Tennessee State		L. T. Smith Stadium; Bowling Green, KY	W 30–0	13,500	
October 6	Western Carolina*	No. 13	L. T. Smith Stadium; Bowling Green, KY	W 45–7	13,400	
October 13	Tennessee Tech	No. 11	L. T. Smith Stadium; Bowling Green, KY	W 41–0	13,150	
October 20	at Eastern Kentucky	No. 6	Hanger Field; Richmond, KY (Battle of the Bluegrass)	W 35–0	19,500	
October 27	Morehead State^{†}	No. 5	L. T. Smith Stadium; Bowling Green, KY	W 34–7	19,250	
November 3	at Middle Tennessee	No. 3	Johnny "Red" Floyd Stadium; Murfreesboro, TN (100 Miles of Hate)	W 42–8	10,000	
November 10	at Butler*	No. 3	Butler Bowl; Indianapolis, IN	W 48–6	3,425	
November 17	Murray State	No. 3	L. T. Smith Stadium; Bowling Green, KY (Battle for the Red Belt)	W 32–27	19,250	
December 1	Lehigh	No. 2	L. T. Smith Stadium; Bowling Green, KY (NCAA Division II Quarterfinal)	W 25–16	12,500	
December 8	vs. No. 5 Grambling	No. 2	BREC Memorial Stadium; Baton Rouge, LA (Grantland Rice Bowl—NCAA Division II Semifinal)	W 28–20	15,000	
December 15	vs. No. 3 Louisiana Tech	No. 2	Charles C. Hughes Stadium; Sacramento, CA (Camellia Bowl—NCAA Division II Championship Game)	L 0–34	12,016	
*Non-conference game; ^{†}Homecoming; Rankings from AP Poll released prior to the game
