= 1973 Richmond Spiders football team =

American college football season

1973 Richmond Spiders football
- Conference: Southern Conference
- Record: 8–2 (5–1 SoCon)
- Head coach: Frank Jones (8th season)
- Home stadium: City Stadium

1973 Southern Conference football standings
	Conf.					Overall
Team	W		L		T	W		L		T
East Carolina $	7	–	0	–	0	9	–	2	–	0
Richmond	5	–	1	–	0	8	–	2	–	0
William & Mary	3	–	2	–	0	6	–	5	–	0
Furman	3	–	3	–	0	7	–	4	–	0
Appalachian State	2	–	2	–	0	3	–	7	–	1
VMI	2	–	4	–	0	2	–	9	–	0
Davidson	1	–	6	–	0	2	–	8	–	0
The Citadel	1	–	6	–	0	3	–	8	–	0
$ – Conference champion

The 1973 Richmond Spiders football team represented the University of Richmond as a member of the Southern Conference (SoCon) during the 1973 NCAA Division I football season. Led by eighth-year head coach Frank Jones, the Spiders, compiled an overall record of 8–2 with a mark of 5–1 conference play, placing second in the SoCon, and outscored their opponents 298 to 112. Richmond was ranked for one week in the AP poll before an upset loss to Northeast Louisiana.

== Schedule ==
Date	Opponent	Rank	Site	Result	Attendance	Source
September 15	at Davidson		Richardson Stadium; Davidson, NC	W 42–0	3,000	
September 22	VMI		City Stadium; Richmond, VA (rivalry)	W 35–0	11,687	
September 29	Wake Forest*		City Stadium; Richmond, VA	W 41–0	11,423	
October 6	at Furman		Sirrine Stadium; Greenville, SC	W 20–17		
October 13	Southern Miss*		City Stadium; Richmond, VA (Tobacco Bowl)	W 42–29	20,000	
October 20	West Virginia*		City Stadium; Richmond, VA	W 38–17	21,172	
October 27	at Northeast Louisiana*	No. 20	Brown Stadium; Monroe, LA	L 8–14		
November 3	The Citadel		City Stadium; Richmond, VA	W 27–0	9,834	
November 10	at East Carolina		Ficklen Stadium; Greenville, NC	L 14–44		
November 17	at William & Mary		Cary Field; Williamsburg, VA (rivalry)	W 31–0	15,500	
*Non-conference game; Rankings from AP Poll released prior to the game
