= 1973 East Tennessee State Buccaneers football team =

American college football season

1973 East Tennessee State Buccaneers football
- Conference: Ohio Valley Conference
- Record: 4–7 (3–4 OVC)
- Head coach: Roy Frazier (1st season)
- Home stadium: Memorial Stadium

1973 Ohio Valley Conference football standings
	Conf.					Overall
Team	W		L		T	W		L		T
No. 3 Western Kentucky $^	7	–	0	–	0	12	–	1	–	0
Murray State	5	–	2	–	0	7	–	3	–	0
Eastern Kentucky	4	–	3	–	0	7	–	4	–	0
Morehead State	4	–	3	–	0	6	–	5	–	0
East Tennessee State	3	–	4	–	0	4	–	7	–	0
Middle Tennessee	3	–	4	–	0	4	–	7	–	0
Tennessee Tech	1	–	6	–	0	2	–	8	–	1
Austin Peay	1	–	6	–	0	2	–	8	–	0
$ – Conference champion; ^ – NCAA Division II playoff participant; Rankings from AP small college poll

The 1973 East Tennessee State Buccaneers football team represented East Tennessee State University as a member of the Ohio Valley Conference (OVC) during the 1973 NCAA Division II football season. Led by first-year head coach Roy Frazier, the Buccaneers compiled an overall record of 4–7, with a mark of 3–4 in conference play, and finished tied for fifth in the OVC.

== Schedule ==
Date	Opponent	Site	Result	Attendance	Source
September 15	Carson–Newman*	Memorial Stadium; Johnson City, TN	L 23–26	9,624	
September 22	Eastern Kentucky	Memorial Stadium; Johnson City, TN	W 38–14	8,327	
September 29	at Western Kentucky	L. T. Smith Stadium; Bowling Green, KY	L 0–30	13,500	
October 6	at Tennessee Tech	Tucker Stadium; Cookeville, TN	W 27–14	7,500	
October 13	Appalachian State*	Memorial Stadium; Johnson City, TN	W 19–11	8,152	
October 20	Murray State^{†}	Memorial Stadium; Johnson City, TN	L 14–20	7,831	
October 27	at Furman*	Sirrine Stadium; Greenville, SC	L 21–40	9,200	
November 3	at Morehead State	Jayne Stadium; Morehead, KY	L 28–38	5,000	
November 10	Middle Tennessee	Memorial Stadium; Johnson City, TN	W 40–16	3,821	
November 17	at Austin Peay	Municipal Stadium; Clarksville, TN	L 13–28	5,500	
November 24	at Chattanooga*	Chamberlain Field; Chattanooga, TN	L 21–26	3,223	
*Non-conference game; ^{†}Homecoming; Source:
