= 1914 Washington and Lee Generals football team =

American college football season

1914 Washington and Lee Generals football
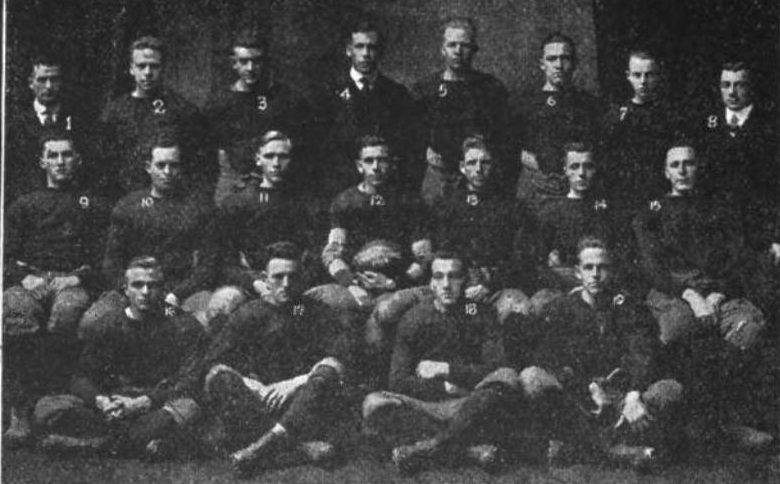

SAIAA co-champion
- Conference: South Atlantic Intercollegiate Athletic Association
- Record: 9–0 (3–0 SAIAA)
- Head coach: Jogger Elcock (1st season)
- Home stadium: Wilson Field

1914 South Atlantic Intercollegiate Athletic Association football standings
	Conf.					Overall
Team	W		L		T	W		L		T
Washington and Lee +	3	–	0	–	0	9	–	0	–	0
Virginia +	3	–	0	–	0	8	–	1	–	0
North Carolina	1	–	1	–	0	10	–	1	–	0
VPI	1	–	1	–	0	6	–	2	–	1
Georgetown	0	–	1	–	1	2	–	4	–	2
North Carolina A&M	0	–	2	–	1	3	–	3	–	1
St. John's (MD)	0	–	1	–	0	0	–	1	–	0
Johns Hopkins	0	–	1	–	0	2	–	5	–	1
Richmond	0	–	2	–	0	5	–	4	–	0
+ – Conference co-champions

The 1914 Washington and Lee Generals football team represented Washington and Lee University as a member of the South Atlantic Intercollegiate Athletic Association (SAIAA) during the 1914 college football season. Led by Jogger Elcock in his first year as head coach, the Generals compiled an undefeated, 9–0 record (3–0 SAIAA) and winning the SAIAA title. The team outscored its opponents 324 to 12.

Tackle Ted Shultz was selected an All-American by the Philadelphia Public Ledger. College Football Hall of Fame inductee Harry "Cy" Young was in the backfield. Edward Donahue was later a coach.

== Schedule ==
Date	Time	Opponent	Site	Result	Attendance	Source
September 26		Marshall*	Wilson Field; Lexington, VA	W 34–0		
October 3		Morris Harvey*	Wilson Field; Lexington, VA	W 103–0		
October 10		Roanoke*	Wilson Field; Lexington, VA	W 69–0		
October 17		vs. Georgetown	Broad Street Park; Richmond, VA	W 14–0	3,000	
October 24		Wake Forest*	Wilson Field; Lexington, VA	W 72–0		
October 31	3:00 p.m.	vs. VPI	Fair Grounds; Roanoke, VA	W 7–6	5,000	
November 7		vs. Swarthmore*	Fair Grounds; Lynchburg, VA	W 10–0		
November 14		vs. West Virginia*	Charleston, WV	W 8–6		
November 26		vs. North Carolina A&M	League Park; Norfolk, VA	W 7–0	5,000	
*Non-conference game
