= 1973 The Citadel Bulldogs football team =

American college football season

1973 The Citadel Bulldogs football
- Conference: Southern Conference
- Record: 3–8 (1–6 SoCon)
- Head coach: Bobby Ross (1st season)
- Home stadium: Johnson Hagood Stadium

1973 Southern Conference football standings
	Conf.					Overall
Team	W		L		T	W		L		T
East Carolina $	7	–	0	–	0	9	–	2	–	0
Richmond	5	–	1	–	0	8	–	2	–	0
William & Mary	3	–	2	–	0	6	–	5	–	0
Furman	3	–	3	–	0	7	–	4	–	0
Appalachian State	2	–	2	–	0	3	–	7	–	1
VMI	2	–	4	–	0	2	–	9	–	0
Davidson	1	–	6	–	0	2	–	8	–	0
The Citadel	1	–	6	–	0	3	–	8	–	0
$ – Conference champion

The 1973 The Citadel Bulldogs football team represented The Citadel, The Military College of South Carolina in the 1973 NCAA Division I football season. Bobby Ross served as head coach for the first season. The Bulldogs played as members of the Southern Conference and played home games at Johnson Hagood Stadium.

== Schedule ==
Date	Opponent	Site	Result	Attendance	Source
September 8	at Clemson*	Memorial Stadium; Clemson, SC	L 12–14	40,000	
September 15	Presbyterian*	Johnson Hagood Stadium; Charleston, SC	W 25–13	15,150	
September 22	at Illinois State*	Hancock Stadium; Normal, IL	L 6–24	9,000	
September 29	William & Mary	Johnson Hagood Stadium; Charleston, SC	L 12–24	13,650	
October 6	at VMI	Alumni Memorial Stadium; Lexington, VA (rivalry)	L 6–23	6,750	
October 13	Chattanooga*	Johnson Hagood Stadium; Charleston, SC	W 28–20	10,120	
October 20	East Carolina	Johnson Hagood Stadium; Charleston, SC	L 0–34	13,300	
October 27	at Appalachian State	Conrad Stadium; Boone, NC	L 6–31	7,855	
November 3	at Richmond	City Stadium; Richmond, VA	L 0–27	9,834	
November 10	Furman^{†}	Johnson Hagood Stadium; Charleston, SC (rivalry)	W 26–21	12,650	
November 17	Davidson	Johnson Hagood Stadium; Charleston, SC	L 16–19		
*Non-conference game; ^{†}Homecoming
