= Joseph M. Wood =

American football coach

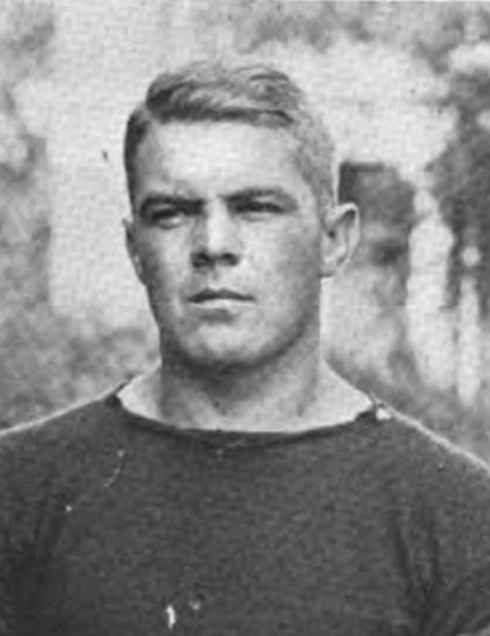
- Wood pictured in Corks and Curls 1916, Virginia yearbook

Coaching career (HC unless noted)
- 1914: Virginia

Head coaching record
- Overall: 8–1

Accomplishments and honors

Championships
- 1 SAIAA (1914)

Joseph Miller Wood was an American football coach. He served as the head football coach at the University of Virginia for one season, in 1914, compiling a record of 8–1. He was a member of Beta Theta Pi.

== Head coaching record ==
Year	Team	Overall	Conference	Standing	Bowl/playoffs
Virginia Orange and Blue (South Atlantic Intercollegiate Athletic Association) (1914)
1914	Virginia	8–1	3–0	T–1st	
Virginia:		8–1	3–0		
Total:		8–1			
National championship Conference title Conference division title or championship game berth
