= 2018 Sacramento City Council election =

Local election in California

- June 5 (primary)

4 of 8 seats on Sacramento City Council

The 2018 Sacramento City Council election took place on June 5, 2018, to elect four of the eight seats of the Sacramento City Council. Runoffs only occur if no candidate receives more than 50% of the votes cast in the contest, but no runoffs occurred this year for the Sacramento City Council. Local elections in California are officially nonpartisan. Each councilmember is elected to a four-year term, and does not have any term limits.

== District 1 ==
Incumbent Angelique Ashby was elected to the 1st district in 2010 and 2014. She was eligible for reelection.

=== Endorsements ===
Angelique Ashby

Organizations

- California Apartment Association

Labor unions

- California Federation of Labor Unions

=== Results ===
2018 Sacramento City Council 1st district election
Primary election
Candidate	Votes	%
Angelique Ashby (incumbent)	7,731	73.3
Gabriell Garcia	1,381	13.1
Edward T. Lewis	950	9.0
Don Niel Sim	487	4.6
Total votes	10,549	100.0

== District 3 ==
Incumbent Jeff Harris was elected to the 3rd district in 2014 in the runoff with 55.3% of the vote. He was eligible for reelection.

=== Endorsements ===
Jeff S. Harris

Organizations

- California Apartment Association

=== Results ===
2018 Sacramento City Council 3rd district election
Primary election
Candidate	Votes	%
Jeff S. Harris (incumbent)	10,087	100.0
Total votes	10,087	100.0

== District 5 ==
Incumbent Jay Schenirer was elected to the 5th district in 2010 and 2014. He was eligible for reelection.

=== Endorsements ===
Jay Schenirer

Organizations

- California Apartment Association
Tamika L'ecluse

Labor unions

- National Nurses United

=== Results ===
2018 Sacramento City Council 5th district election
Primary election
Candidate	Votes	%
Jay Schenirer (incumbent)	6,765	53.8
Tamika L'ecluse	4,926	39.2
Joseph Barry	875	7.0
Total votes	12,566	100.0

== District 7 ==
Incumbent Rick Jennings was elected to the 7th district in 2014 in the primary with 50.5% of the vote. He was eligible for reelection.

=== Endorsements ===
Rick Jennings

Organizations

- California Apartment Association
Tristan Brown

Labor unions

- California Federation of Labor Unions
- National Nurses United

=== Results ===
2018 Sacramento City Council 7th district election
Primary election
Candidate	Votes	%
Rick Jennings (incumbent)	9,690	74.6
Tristan Brown	2,656	20.5
Victor Edinburgh	638	4.9
Total votes	12,984	100.0
