= 1973 Virginia Cavaliers football team =

American college football season

1973 Virginia Cavaliers football
- Conference: Atlantic Coast Conference
- Record: 4–7 (3–3 ACC)
- Head coach: Don Lawrence (3rd season)
- Captains: Paul Ryczek; Gerard Mullins; Anthony Zmudzin
- Home stadium: Scott Stadium

1973 Atlantic Coast Conference football standings
	Conf.					Overall
Team	W		L		T	W		L		T
No. 16 NC State $	6	–	0	–	0	9	–	3	–	0
No. 20 Maryland	5	–	1	–	0	8	–	4	–	0
Clemson	4	–	2	–	0	5	–	6	–	0
Virginia	3	–	3	–	0	4	–	7	–	0
Duke	1	–	4	–	1	2	–	8	–	1
North Carolina	1	–	5	–	0	4	–	7	–	0
Wake Forest	0	–	5	–	1	1	–	9	–	1
$ – Conference champion; Rankings from AP Poll

The 1973 Virginia Cavaliers football team represented the University of Virginia during the 1973 NCAA Division I football season. The Cavaliers were led by third-year head coach Don Lawrence and played their home games at Scott Stadium in Charlottesville, Virginia. They competed as members of the Atlantic Coast Conference, finishing in fourth. Lawrence was fired as head coach following the end of the season. He had a record of 11–22 at Virginia.

== Schedule ==
Date	Opponent	Site	Result	Attendance	Source
September 8	VMI*	Scott Stadium; Charlottesville, VA	W 16–0	21,000	
September 15	at No. 17 NC State	Carter Stadium; Raleigh, NC	L 23–43	36,200	
September 22	at No. 20 Missouri*	Faurot Field; Columbia, MO	L 7–31	42,250	
September 29	Duke	Scott Stadium; Charlottesville, VA	W 7–3	20,300	
October 6	Vanderbilt*^{†}	Scott Stadium; Charlottesville, VA	L 22–39	21,000	
October 13	at Clemson	Memorial Stadium; Clemson, SC	L 27–32	28,000	
October 20	at Virginia Tech*	Lane Stadium; Blacksburg, VA (rivalry)	L 15–27	38,000	
October 27	Wake Forest	Scott Stadium; Charlottesville, VA	W 21–10	16,100	
November 3	North Carolina	Scott Stadium; Charlottesville, VA (South's Oldest Rivalry)	W 44–40	23,500	
November 10	at Maryland	Byrd Stadium; College Park, MD (rivalry)	L 0–33	22,300	
November 17	at West Virginia*	Mountaineer Field; Morgantown, WV	L 17–42	26,000	
*Non-conference game; ^{†}Homecoming; Rankings from AP Poll released prior to the game

== Personnel ==
1973 Virginia Cavaliers football team roster
Players			Coaches
Offense: Pos. / # / Name / Class; QB / / Scott Gardner / So	Defense: Pos. / # / Name / Class	Special teams: Pos. / # / Name / Class	Head coach: Don Lawrence; Coordinators/assistant coaches Legend: (C) Team captain; (S) Suspended; (I) Ineligible; Injured; Redshirt
