= 1914 Georgetown Blue and Gray football team =

American college football season

1914 Georgetown Blue and Gray football
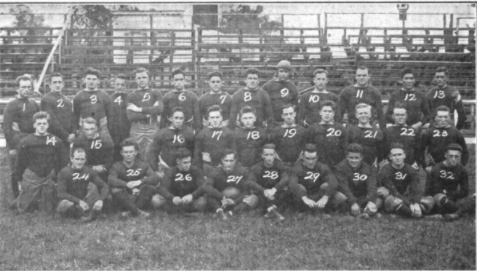
- Conference: South Atlantic Intercollegiate Athletic Association
- Record: 2–4–2 (0–1–1 SAIAA)
- Head coach: Albert Exendine (1st season)
- Captain: Fred Murray
- Home stadium: Georgetown Field

1914 South Atlantic Intercollegiate Athletic Association football standings
	Conf.					Overall
Team	W		L		T	W		L		T
Washington and Lee +	3	–	0	–	0	9	–	0	–	0
Virginia +	3	–	0	–	0	8	–	1	–	0
North Carolina	1	–	1	–	0	10	–	1	–	0
VPI	1	–	1	–	0	6	–	2	–	1
Georgetown	0	–	1	–	1	2	–	4	–	2
North Carolina A&M	0	–	2	–	1	3	–	3	–	1
St. John's (MD)	0	–	1	–	0	0	–	1	–	0
Johns Hopkins	0	–	1	–	0	0	–	2	–	0
Richmond	0	–	2	–	0	5	–	4	–	0
+ – Conference co-champions

The 1914 Georgetown Blue and Gray football team represented Georgetown University during the 1914 college football season. Led by Albert Exendine in his first year as head coach, the team went 2–4–2.

== Schedule ==
Date	Opponent	Site	Result	Attendance	Source
September 26	Fordham*	Georgetown Field; Washington, DC	T 0–0		
October 3	at Navy*	Worden Field; Annapolis, MD	L 0–13		
October 17	vs. Washington and Lee	Broad Street Park; Richmond, VA	L 0–14	3,000	
October 24	at Pittsburgh*	Forbes Field; Pittsburgh, PA	L 0–21		
October 31	West Virginia Wesleyan*	Georgetown Field; Washington, DC	W 27–0		
November 7	North Carolina A&M	Georgetown Field; Washington, DC	T 7–7		
November 21	Washington & Jefferson*	Georgetown Field; Washington, DC	L 6–14		
November 26	Gallaudet*	Georgetown Field; Washington, DC	W 12–7		
*Non-conference game
