= Clayton Heath =

American football player (born 1951)

No. 37, 35
- Position: Running back

Personal information
- Born: February 15, 1951 (age 75); Chester County, South Carolina, U.S.
- Listed height: 5 ft 11 in (1.80 m)
- Listed weight: 195 lb (88 kg)

Career information
- High school: Roosevelt (NY)
- College: Wake Forest
- NFL draft: 1974: 13th round, 338th overall pick

Career history
- Buffalo Bills (1976); Miami Dolphins (1976)
- Stats at Pro Football Reference

Clayton Heath (born February 15, 1951) is an American former professional football running back who played in the National Football League (NFL) in 1976 for the Miami Dolphins and Buffalo Bills. He was drafted 338th overall in the 13th round of the 1974 NFL Draft by the Dolphins.
