= Don Lawrence (American football) =

American football player and coach (1937–2024)

No. 78
- Positions: Defensive tackle, tackle, guard

Personal information
- Born: June 4, 1937; Cleveland, Ohio, U.S.
- Died: October 30, 2024 (aged 87); Leawood, Kansas, U.S.
- Listed height: 6 ft 1 in (1.85 m)
- Listed weight: 245 lb (111 kg)

Career information
- High school: Notre Dame-Cathedral Latin (Chardon, Ohio)
- College: Notre Dame
- NFL draft: 1959: 7th round, 76th overall pick

Career history

Playing
- Washington Redskins (1959–1961); Philadelphia Eagles (1963)*
- * Offseason or practice squad member only

Coaching
- Kansas State (1964-1965) Assistant coach; Cincinnati (1966) Assistant coach; Virginia (1967-1970) Assistant coach; Virginia (1971-1973) Head coach; TCU (1974-1975) Assistant coach; Missouri (1976-1977) Assistant coach; BC Lions (1978–1979) Offensive line coach; Kansas City Chiefs (1980) Special teams coach; Kansas City Chiefs (1981–1982) Defensive line coach; Buffalo Bills (1983) Defensive line coach; Buffalo Bills (1984) Defensive coordinator; Tampa Bay Buccaneers (1985–1986) Defensive line coach; Kansas City Chiefs (1987–1988) Defensive line coach; Winnipeg Blue Bombers (1989) Offensive line coach; Buffalo Bills (1990–1997) Tight ends coach; Arizona Cardinals (2000) Tight ends coach; Frankfurt Galaxy (2003-2004) Offensive line coach; Amsterdam Admirals (2005-2006) Offensive line coach; Berlin Thunder (2007) Offensive coordinator; Omaha Nighthawks (2011-2012) Offensive line coach

Awards and highlights
- 2× World Bowl champion (XI, XIII)

Career NFL statistics
- Games played: 35
- Games started: 14
- Stats at Pro Football Reference

Head coaching record
- Career: 11–22–0 (.333)
- Coaching profile at Pro Football Reference

Donald Jerome Lawrence (June 4, 1937 – October 30, 2024) was an American football player and coach. He was the offensive coordinator for the Berlin Thunder in NFL Europa. He won two World Bowl rings with the Amsterdam Admirals and Frankfurt Galaxy. As the tight ends coach from 1990 to 1993, he took the Buffalo Bills to four consecutive Super Bowls. He coached at Notre Dame, Kansas State, Cincinnati, Texas Christian, and Missouri.

Lawrence served as the head football coach at the University of Virginia. He played college football at Notre Dame. He played three seasons in the National Football League for the Washington Redskins.

During his 45-year coaching career, Lawrence is unique in having coached in four straight Super Bowls (NFL) and four straight World Bowls (NFLE). Lawrence died in Overland Park, Kansas on October 30, 2024, at the age of 87.

== Head coaching record ==
Year	Team	Overall	Conference	Standing	Bowl/playoffs
Virginia Cavaliers (Atlantic Coast Conference) (1971–1973)
1971	Virginia	3–8	2–3	T–3rd	
1972	Virginia	4–7	1–5	T–6th	
1973	Virginia	4–7	3–3	4th	
Virginia:		11–22	6–11		
Total:		11–22			
