= 1914 Virginia Orange and Blue football team =

American college football season

1914 Virginia Orange and Blue football
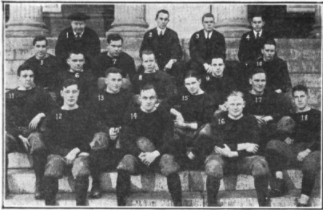

SAIAA co-champion
- Conference: South Atlantic Intercollegiate Athletic Association
- Record: 8–1 (3–0 SAIAA)
- Head coach: Joseph M. Wood (1st season)
- Captain: Eugene Mayer
- Home stadium: Lambeth Field

1914 South Atlantic Intercollegiate Athletic Association football standings
| | Conf. | | | | | Overall |
| Team | W | | L | | T | W | | L | | T |
|---|---|---|---|---|---|---|---|---|---|---|
| Washington and Lee + | 3 | – | 0 | – | 0 | 9 | – | 0 | – | 0 |
| Virginia + | 3 | – | 0 | – | 0 | 8 | – | 1 | – | 0 |
| North Carolina | 1 | – | 1 | – | 0 | 10 | – | 1 | – | 0 |
| VPI | 1 | – | 1 | – | 0 | 6 | – | 2 | – | 1 |
| Georgetown | 0 | – | 1 | – | 1 | 2 | – | 4 | – | 2 |
| North Carolina A&M | 0 | – | 2 | – | 1 | 3 | – | 3 | – | 1 |
| St. John's (MD) | 0 | – | 1 | – | 0 | 0 | – | 1 | – | 0 |
| Johns Hopkins | 0 | – | 1 | – | 0 | 0 | – | 2 | – | 0 |
| Richmond | 0 | – | 2 | – | 0 | 5 | – | 4 | – | 0 |
+ – Conference co-champions

The 1914 Virginia Orange and Blue football team represented the University of Virginia as a member of the South Atlantic Intercollegiate Athletic Association (SAIAA) during the 1914 college football season. Led by Joseph M. Wood in his first and only season as head coach, the Orange and Blue compiled an overall record of 8–1 with a mark of 3–0 in conference play, sharing the SAIAA title with Washington and Lee. Virginia outscored its opponents 353 to 38 on the season.

== Schedule ==
| Date | Opponent | Site | Result | Attendance | Source |
|---|---|---|---|---|---|
| September 26 | Randolph–Macon* | Lambeth Field; Charlottesville, VA | W 39–0 | | |
| October 3 | at Yale* | Yale Bowl; New Haven, CT | L 0–21 | | |
| October 10 | Richmond | Lambeth Field; Charlottesville, VA | W 62–0 | | |
| October 17 | South Carolina* | Lambeth Field; Charlottesville, VA | W 49–7 | | |
| October 24 | Georgia* | Lambeth Field; Charlottesville, VA | W 28–0 | | |
| October 31 | at Vanderbilt* | Dudley Field; Nashville, TN | W 20–7 | | |
| November 7 | St. John's (MD) | Lambeth Field; Charlottesville, VA | W 88–0 | | |
| November 14 | at Swarthmore* | Clothier Field Stadium; Swarthmore, PA | W 47–0 | | |
| November 26 | vs. North Carolina | Broad Street Park; Richmond, VA (rivalry) | W 20–3 | 15,000 | |
*Non-conference game

== Players ==
=== Varsity lettermen ===
==== Line ====
| Player | Position | Games started | Hometown | Prep school | Height | Weight | Age |
|---|---|---|---|---|---|---|---|
| Rube Barker | tackle | | East St. Louis, Illinois | | | 175 | |
| Harris Coleman | guard | | Stanford, Kentucky | | | | |
| Peyton Evans | center | | | | | | |
| James T. Gillette | end | | | | | | |
| Claude Moore | guard | | | | | | |
| James Clay Ward | tackle | | | | | | |
| James L. White | end | | Macon, Georgia | | | | |

==== Backfield ====
| Player | Position | Games started | Hometown | Prep school | Height | Weight | Age |
|---|---|---|---|---|---|---|---|
| Robert Kent Gooch | quarterback | | Roanoke, Virginia | | | | |
| Buck Mayer | halfback | | Norfolk, Virginia | | | 172 | |
| M. A. Sparr | fullback | | | | | | |
| William E. Word | halfback | | | | | | |

==== Subs ====
| Player | Position | Games started | Hometown | Prep school | Height | Weight | Age |
|---|---|---|---|---|---|---|---|
| George Wayne Anderson | center | | | | | | |
| W. Watkins Flannagan | end | | | | | | |
| Edward C. Anderson | halfback | | | | | | |
| Norberne Berkeley | quarterback | | | | | | |
| Knox Walker | fullback | | | | | | |
