= Rick Jennings =

American football player (born 1953)

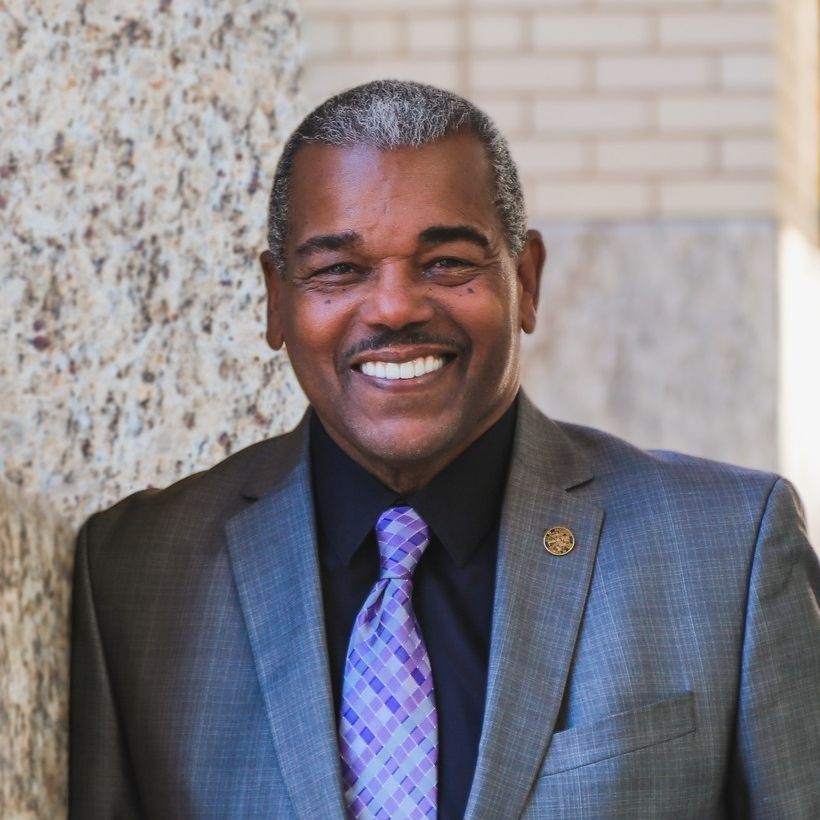

Member of the Sacramento City Council from the 7th district
- Incumbent
- Assumed office 2014
- Preceded by: Darrell Fong

Personal details
- Born: April 17, 1953 (age 73) Houston, Texas, U.S.
- Party: Democratic
- Spouse: Cassandra
- Education: University of Maryland, College Park (BA)
- Football career

No. 33, 81, 88
- Positions: Wide receiver, running back

Personal information
- Listed height: 5 ft 9 in (1.75 m)
- Listed weight: 180 lb (82 kg)

Career information
- High school: Calvin Coolidge (Washington, D.C.)
- College: Maryland
- NFL draft: 1976: 11th round, 313th overall pick

Career history
- Oakland Raiders (1976–1977); Green Bay Packers (1977)*; New Orleans Saints (1977)*; Tampa Bay Buccaneers (1977)*; San Francisco 49ers (1977); Oakland Raiders (1977); Tampa Bay Buccaneers (1978)*
- * Offseason or practice squad member only

Awards and highlights
- Super Bowl champion (XI)

Career NFL statistics
- Rushing attempts: 10
- Rushing yards: 22
- Receptions: 1
- Receiving yards: 10
- Stats at Pro Football Reference

Richard Jennings II (born April 17, 1953) is an American politician and former football player. He played college football at the University of Maryland, College Park and professional football for the Oakland Raiders, the Tampa Bay Buccaneers, and the San Francisco 49ers. Since 2014, he has served on the Sacramento City Council from the 7th district.

== Football career ==
In 1976, Jennings was drafted 313th overall in the 11th round by the Oakland Raiders, but was claimed by the Tampa Bay Buccaneers off waivers. Claimed by the Bucs on a Tuesday and waived again that Thursday, his two days set the record for the shortest time spent with the club. He then returned to the Raiders, and averaged 26.1 yards on 16 kick returns for the eventual Super Bowl XI champions before suffering a knee injury that required season-ending surgery. In the 1977 offseason, Jennings passed through the Raiders, Green Bay Packers, and New Orleans Saints organizations, being waived by each, before being again claimed by the Buccaneers. After being waived a second time by the Buccaneers without ever playing a single down, Jennings played with the 49ers, and with the Raiders for a third stint.

== Political career ==
After the NFL, Jennings served as Sacramento School Board Member, and ran the Center for Fathers and Families, an organization that assists fatherless families. He has also counseled troubled NBA player Ron Artest.

In June 2014, Jennings was elected to the Sacramento City Council serving District 7. In May 2025, Jennings declined a pay raise proposed by the city's compensation commission due to the city's budget deficit.

== Personal life ==
Jennings is married to Cassandra Jennings, the president and CEO of St. HOPE. The two met in college.
