= 1973 Rice Owls football team =

American college football season

1973 Rice Owls football
- Conference: Southwest Conference
- Record: 5–6 (4–3 SWC)
- Head coach: Al Conover (2nd season)
- Home stadium: Rice Stadium

1973 Southwest Conference football standings
	Conf.					Overall
Team	W		L		T	W		L		T
No. 14 Texas $	7	–	0	–	0	8	–	3	–	0
No. 11 Texas Tech	6	–	1	–	0	11	–	1	–	0
Rice	4	–	3	–	0	5	–	6	–	0
SMU	3	–	3	–	1	6	–	4	–	1
Arkansas	3	–	3	–	1	5	–	5	–	1
Texas A&M	3	–	4	–	0	5	–	6	–	0
TCU	1	–	6	–	0	3	–	8	–	0
Baylor	0	–	7	–	0	2	–	9	–	0
$ – Conference champion; Rankings from AP Poll

The 1973 Rice Owls football team was an American football team that represented Rice University in the Southwest Conference during the 1973 NCAA Division I football season. In their second year under head coach Al Conover, the team compiled a 5–6 record.

== Schedule ==
Date	Opponent	Site	Result	Attendance	Source
September 15	at No. 18 Houston*	Houston Astrodome; Houston, TX (rivalry)	L 6–24	43,917	
September 22	Montana*	Rice Stadium; Houston, TX	W 21–10	18,000	
September 29	at No. 10 LSU*	Tiger Stadium; Baton Rouge, LA	L 9–24	66,226	
October 13	No. 9 Notre Dame*	Rice Stadium; Houston, TX	L 0–28	50,321	
October 20	SMU	Rice Stadium; Houston, TX (rivalry)	L 16–27	25,000	
October 27	at No. 19 Texas	Memorial Stadium; Austin, TX (rivalry)	L 13–55	62,300	
November 3	at No. 15 Texas Tech	Jones Stadium; Lubbock, TX	L 6–19	37,400	
November 10	Arkansas	Rice Stadium; Houston, TX	W 17–7	23,500	
November 17	Texas A&M	Rice Stadium; Houston, TX	W 24–20	45,000	
November 24	at TCU	Amon G. Carter Stadium; Fort Worth, TX	W 14–9	12,827	
December 1	Baylor	Rice Stadium; Houston, TX	W 27–0	14,000	
*Non-conference game; Rankings from AP Poll released prior to the game

== Game summaries ==
=== At Texas ===
Rice Owls (1–4) at #19 Texas Longhorns (3–2)

Quarter	1	2	3	4	Total
Rice	7	0	0	6	13
Texas	7	13	14	21	55

at Memorial Stadium, Austin, Texas

- Date: October 27, 1973
- Game time: 7:30 p.m.
- Game weather: 72 °F (22 °C)
- Game attendance: 62,300
- Box Score

Team	Category	Player	Statistics
Rice	Passing		
Rice	Rushing		
Rice	Receiving		
Texas	Passing	Marty Akins	5/6, 55 Yds, 2 TD
Texas	Rushing	Roosevelt Leaks	29 Rush, 193 Yds, 2 TD
Texas	Receiving	Pat Padgett	2 Rec, 48 Yds

Scoring summary

Quarter	Time	Drive			Team	Scoring information	Score	
Quarter	Time	Plays	Yards	TOP	Team	Scoring information	RU	UT
1	6:54	10	80	4:30	Rice	Ed Lofton 13-yard touchdown reception from Tommy Kramer, Alan Pringle kick good	7	0
1	2:43	4	41	1:14	Texas	Lonnie Bennett 5-yard touchdown run, Billy Schott kick good	7	7
2	8:02	2	28	0:39	Texas	Roosevelt Leaks 25-yard touchdown run, Billy Schott kick no good	7	13
2	1:35	6	60	1:08	Texas	Parker Alford 5-yard touchdown reception from Marty Akins, Billy Schott kick good	7	20
3	7:42	15	80	7:18	Texas	Roosevelt Leaks 6-yard touchdown run, Billy Schott kick good	7	27
3	1:57	8	51	3:53	Texas	Parker Alford 3-yard touchdown reception from Marty Akins, Billy Schott kick good	7	34
4	10:40	1	12	0:06	Texas	Mike Presley 12-yard touchdown run, Billy Schott kick good	7	41
4	7:34	4	33	1:00	Rice	Ardie Segars 25-yard touchdown reception from Claude Reed, 2-point pass failed	13	41
4	7:13	2	67	0:31	Texas	Mike Presely 5-yard touchdown run, Billy Schott kick good	13	48
4	3:32	6	29	2:52	Texas	Mike Presley 1-yard touchdown run, Billy Schott kick good	13	55
"TOP" = time of possession. For other American football terms, see Glossary of American football.							13	55

== Personnel ==
1973 Rice Owls football team roster
Players
Coaches
Offense

Pos.	#	Name	Class
QB	12	Reggie Anderson	So
QB		Tommy Kramer
		Ed Lofton
QB		Claude Reed
		Ardie Segars

Defense

Pos.	#	Name	Class
DB	40	Preston Anderson	Sr

Special teams

Pos.	#	Name	Class
K	17	Alan Pringle	Jr

Head coach

- Al Conover

Coordinators/assistant coaches

Legend

- (C) Team captain
- (S) Suspended
- (I) Ineligible
- Injured
- Redshirt
