= 1973 Texas Longhorns football team =

American college football season

1973 Texas Longhorns football

SWC champion

Cotton Bowl Classic, L 3–19 vs Nebraska
- Conference: Southwest Conference

Ranking
- Coaches: No. 8
- AP: No. 14
- Record: 8–3 (7–0 SWC)
- Head coach: Darrell Royal (17th season)
- Offensive coordinator: Fred Akers
- Offensive scheme: Wishbone
- Defensive coordinator: Mike Campbell
- Base defense: 4–4
- Home stadium: Memorial Stadium

1973 Southwest Conference football standings
	Conf.					Overall
Team	W		L		T	W		L		T
No. 14 Texas $	7	–	0	–	0	8	–	3	–	0
No. 11 Texas Tech	6	–	1	–	0	11	–	1	–	0
Rice	4	–	3	–	0	5	–	6	–	0
SMU	3	–	3	–	1	6	–	4	–	1
Arkansas	3	–	3	–	1	5	–	5	–	1
Texas A&M	3	–	4	–	0	5	–	6	–	0
TCU	1	–	6	–	0	3	–	8	–	0
Baylor	0	–	7	–	0	2	–	9	–	0
$ – Conference champion; Rankings from AP Poll

The 1973 Texas Longhorns football team represented the University of Texas at Austin in the 1973 NCAA Division I football season. The Longhorns finished the regular season with an 8–2 record and lost to Nebraska in the Cotton Bowl Classic.

== Schedule ==
Date	Time	Opponent	Rank	Site	TV	Result	Attendance	Source
September 21	7:00 p.m.	at Miami (FL)*	No. 6	Miami Orange Bowl; Miami, FL		L 15–20	30,080	
September 29	7:30 p.m.	Texas Tech	No. 14	Memorial Stadium; Austin, TX (rivalry)		W 28–12	77,809	
October 6	7:30 p.m.	Wake Forest*	No. 13	Memorial Stadium; Austin, TX		W 41–0	51,700	
October 13	12:30 p.m.	vs. No. 6 Oklahoma*	No. 13	Cotton Bowl; Dallas, TX (Red River Shootout)	ABC	L 13–52	72,204–72,242	
October 20	2:00 p.m.	at Arkansas		Razorback Stadium; Fayetteville, AR (rivalry)		W 34–6	45,348	
October 27	7:30 p.m.	Rice		Memorial Stadium; Austin, TX (rivalry)		W 55–13	62,300	
November 3	2:00 p.m.	at SMU	No. 19	Cotton Bowl; Dallas, TX	ABC	W 42–14	35,096	
November 10	2:00 p.m.	Baylor	No. 13	Memorial Stadium; Austin, TX (rivalry)		W 42–6	64,500	
November 17	2:00 p.m.	TCU	No. 11	Memorial Stadium; Austin, TX (rivalry)		W 52–7	50,000	
November 22	1:30 p.m.	at Texas A&M	No. 11	Kyle Field; College Station, TX (rivalry)		W 42–13	53,000	
January 1, 1974	1:00 p.m.	vs. No. 12 Nebraska*	No. 8	Cotton Bowl; Dallas, TX (Cotton Bowl Classic)	CBS	L 3–19	67,500	
*Non-conference game; Rankings from AP Poll released prior to the game; All times are in Central time

== Game summaries ==
=== At Miami (FL) ===
#6 Texas Longhorns (0–0) at Miami (FL) Hurricanes (0–0)

Quarter	1	2	3	4	Total
Texas	6	0	6	3	15
Miami (FL)	0	13	7	0	20

at Orange Bowl, Miami, Florida

- Date: September 21, 1973
- Game weather: 84 °F (29 °C)
- Game attendance: 30,080
- Box Score

Team	Category	Player	Statistics
Texas	Passing	Marty Akins	3/3, 42 yards
Texas	Rushing	Roosevelt Leaks	30 rushes, 153 yards, 2 TD
Texas	Receiving	Jim Moore	1 reception, 16 yards
Miami (FL)	Passing		
Miami (FL)	Rushing		
Miami (FL)	Receiving		

Scoring summary

Quarter	Time	Drive			Team	Scoring information	Score	
Quarter	Time	Plays	Yards	TOP	Team	Scoring information	UT	MIA
1	8:01	14	86	6:59	Texas	Roosevelt Leaks 5-yard touchdown run, Billy Schott kick no good	6	0
2	13:25	9	69	3:52	Miami (FL)	Woody Thompson 1-yard touchdown run, kick no good	6	6
2	3:42	16	70	8:57	Miami (FL)	Woody Thompson 1-yard touchdown run, Rod Huffman kick good	6	13
3	8:12	3	14	1:13	Miami (FL)	Woody Thompson 1-yard touchdown run, Rod Huffman kick good	6	20
3	4:50	8	54	3:14	Texas	Roosevelt Leaks 2-yard touchdown run, 2-point pass failed	12	20
4	12:44	10	55	4:09	Texas	34-yard field goal by Billy Schott	15	20
"TOP" = time of possession. For other American football terms, see Glossary of American football.							15	20

=== Texas Tech ===
Texas Tech Red Raiders (2–0) at #14 Texas Longhorns (0–1)

Quarter	1	2	3	4	Total
Texas Tech	0	0	6	6	12
Texas	7	7	0	14	28

at Memorial Stadium, Austin, Texas

- Date: September 29, 1973
- Game time: 7:30 p.m.
- Game weather: 82 °F (28 °C)
- Game attendance: 77,809
- Box Score

Team	Category	Player	Statistics
Texas Tech	Passing		
Texas Tech	Rushing		
Texas Tech	Receiving		
Texas	Passing	Marty Akins	5/8, 73 Yds, INT
Texas	Rushing	Roosevelt Leaks	20 Rush, 89 Yds, TD
Texas	Receiving	Pat Kelly	3 Rec, 53 Yds

Scoring summary

Quarter	Time	Drive			Team	Scoring information	Score	
Quarter	Time	Plays	Yards	TOP	Team	Scoring information	TTU	UT
1	8:08	3	18	1:17	Texas	Roosevelt Leaks 15-yard touchdown run, Billy Schott kick good	0	7
2	14:08	13	86	5:37	Texas	Marty Akins 3-yard touchdown run, Billy Schott kick good	0	14
3	9:45	9	44	4:20	Texas Tech	Lawrence Williams 12-yard touchdown reception from Joe Barnes, kick no good	6	14
4	14:55	8	66	3:25	Texas Tech	James Mosley 21-yard touchdown run, 2-point run failed	12	14
4	8:15	13	70	6:40	Texas	Tommy Landry 3-yard touchdown run, Billy Schott kick good	12	21
4	8:15				Texas	Kickoff fumble recovery in end zone for touchdown by Jay Arnold, Billy Schott kick good	12	28
"TOP" = time of possession. For other American football terms, see Glossary of American football.							12	28

=== Wake Forest ===
Wake Forest Demon Deacons (1–2) at #13 Texas Longhorns (1–1)

Quarter	1	2	3	4	Total
Wake Forest	0	0	0	0	0
Texas	7	7	7	20	41

at Memorial Stadium, Austin, Texas

- Date: October 6, 1973
- Game time: 7:30 p.m.
- Game weather: 81 °F (27 °C)
- Game attendance: 51,700
- Box Score

Team	Category	Player	Statistics
Wake Forest	Passing		
Wake Forest	Rushing		
Wake Forest	Receiving		
Texas	Passing	Marty Akins	6/17, 80 Yds
Texas	Rushing	David Bartek	12 Rush, 85 Yds
Texas	Receiving	Pat Kelly	7 Rec, 91 Yds

Scoring summary

Quarter	Time	Drive			Team	Scoring information	Score	
Quarter	Time	Plays	Yards	TOP	Team	Scoring information	WF	UT
1	5:47	15	80	6:24	Texas	Joe Aboussie 14-yard touchdown run, Billy Schott kick good	0	7
2	2:03	13	90	3:47	Texas	Marty Akins 1-yard touchdown run, Billy Schott kick good	0	14
3	9:23				Texas	Interception returned 58 yards for touchdown by Jay Arnold, Billy Schott kick good	0	21
4	7:50	12	71	5:24	Texas	Lonnie Bennett 4-yard touchdown run, Billy Schott kick good	0	28
4	6:17	4	15	1:27	Texas	Coy Featherston 2-yard touchdown run, Billy Schott kick no good	0	34
4	0:36	3	43	1:14	Texas	Pat Kennedy 15-yard touchdown run, Billy Schott kick good	0	41
"TOP" = time of possession. For other American football terms, see Glossary of American football.							0	41

=== vs Oklahoma ===
#6 Oklahoma Sooners (2–0) vs. #13 Texas Longhorns (2–1)

Quarter	1	2	3	4	Total
Oklahoma	7	14	14	17	52
Texas	3	3	0	7	13

at Cotton Bowl, Dallas, Texas

- Date: October 13
- Game time: 12:30 p.m.
- Game weather: 68 °F (20 °C)
- Game attendance: 72,204
- TV: ABC
- Box Score

Worst loss in Darrell Royal's coaching career

Team	Category	Player	Statistics
Oklahoma	Passing	Steve Davis	5/6, 185 Yds, 2 TD
Oklahoma	Rushing	Joe Washington	12 Rush, 117 Yds
Oklahoma	Receiving	Tinker Owens	4 Rec, 163 Yds, 2 TD
Texas	Passing	Marty Akins	5/9, 64 Yds, INT
Texas	Rushing	Roosevelt Leaks	20 Rush, 82 Yds
Texas	Receiving	Pat Kelly	4 Rec, 71 Yds

Scoring summary

Quarter	Time	Drive			Team	Scoring information	Score	
Quarter	Time	Plays	Yards	TOP	Team	Scoring information	OU	UT
1	10:05	6	82	2:37	Oklahoma	Tinker Owens 40-yard touchdown reception from Joe Washington, Rick Fulcher kick good	7	0
1	3:25	14	79	6:40	Texas	36-yard field goal by Billy Schott	7	3
2	11:14	12	90	5:17	Texas	44-yard field goal by Billy Schott	7	6
2	10:46	2	68	0:28	Oklahoma	Tinker Owens 63-yard touchdown reception from Steve Davis, Rick Fulcher kick good	14	6
2	0:29	3	47	0:31	Oklahoma	Billy Brooks 47-yard touchdown reception from Steve Davis, Rick Fulcher kick good	21	6
3	11:26	8	77	3:34	Oklahoma	Steve Davis 15-yard touchdown run, Rick Fulcher kick good	28	6
3	1:09	2	7	0:46	Oklahoma	Steve Davis 2-yard touchdown run, Rick Fulcher kick good	35	6
4	13:35	4	9	1:15	Oklahoma	25-yard field goal by Rick Fulcher	38	6
4	11:59	1	11	0:07	Oklahoma	Scott Hill 11-yard touchdown run, Rick Fulcher kick good	45	6
4	7:05	7	80	2:55	Texas	Mike Presley 31-yard touchdown run, Billy Schott kick good	45	13
4	1:39	11	81	5:26	Oklahoma	Joe McReynolds 11-yard touchdown run, Fulcher kick good	52	13
"TOP" = time of possession. For other American football terms, see Glossary of American football.							52	13

=== At Arkansas ===
Texas Longhorns (2–2) at Arkansas Razorbacks (3–2)

Quarter	1	2	3	4	Total
Texas	0	6	21	7	34
Arkansas	0	0	0	6	6

at Razorback Stadium, Fayetteville, Arkansas

- Date: October 20, 1973
- Game time: 2:00 p.m. CDT
- Game weather: Clear, 72 °F (22 °C)
- Game attendance: 45,348
- Box Score

Team	Category	Player	Statistics
Texas	Passing	Marty Akins	3/7, 38 Yds
Texas	Rushing	Roosevelt Leaks	24 Rush, 209 Yds, 3 TD
Texas	Receiving	Jim Moore	3 Rec, 27 Yds
Arkansas	Passing		
Arkansas	Rushing		
Arkansas	Receiving		

Scoring summary

Quarter	Time	Drive			Team	Scoring information	Score	
Quarter	Time	Plays	Yards	TOP	Team	Scoring information	UT	UA
2	5:42	18	84	8:33	Texas	Roosevelt Leaks 2-yard touchdown run, Billy Schott kick no good	6	0
3	12:08	6	77	2:52	Texas	Roosevelt Leaks 43-yard touchdown run, Billy Schott kick good	13	0
3	10:03				Texas	Punt returned 73 yards for touchdown by Rob Moore, Billy Schott kick good	20	0
3	1:49	1	59	0:09	Texas	Roosevelt Leaks 59-yard touchdown run, Billy Schott kick good	27	0
4	8:50	1	85	0:12	Texas	Raymond Clayborn 85-yard touchdown run, Billy Schott kick good	34	0
4	0:13				Arkansas	Blocked punt recovered in end zone for touchdown by Rollen Smith, kick no good	34	6
"TOP" = time of possession. For other American football terms, see Glossary of American football.							34	6

=== Rice ===
Rice Owls (1–4) at #19 Texas Longhorns (3–2)

Quarter	1	2	3	4	Total
Rice	7	0	0	6	13
Texas	7	13	14	21	55

at Memorial Stadium, Austin, Texas

- Date: October 27, 1973
- Game time: 7:30 p.m.
- Game weather: 72 °F (22 °C)
- Game attendance: 62,300
- Box Score

Team	Category	Player	Statistics
Rice	Passing		
Rice	Rushing		
Rice	Receiving		
Texas	Passing	Marty Akins	5/6, 55 Yds, 2 TD
Texas	Rushing	Roosevelt Leaks	29 Rush, 193 Yds, 2 TD
Texas	Receiving	Pat Padgett	2 Rec, 48 Yds

Scoring summary

Quarter	Time	Drive			Team	Scoring information	Score	
Quarter	Time	Plays	Yards	TOP	Team	Scoring information	RU	UT
1	6:54	10	80	4:30	Rice	Ed Lofton 13-yard touchdown reception from Tommy Kramer, Alan Pringle kick good	7	0
1	2:43	4	41	1:14	Texas	Lonnie Bennett 5-yard touchdown run, Billy Schott kick good	7	7
2	8:02	2	28	0:39	Texas	Roosevelt Leaks 25-yard touchdown run, Billy Schott kick no good	7	13
2	1:35	6	60	1:08	Texas	Parker Alford 5-yard touchdown reception from Marty Akins, Billy Schott kick good	7	20
3	7:42	15	80	7:18	Texas	Roosevelt Leaks 6-yard touchdown run, Billy Schott kick good	7	27
3	1:57	8	51	3:53	Texas	Parker Alford 3-yard touchdown reception from Marty Akins, Billy Schott kick good	7	34
4	10:40	1	12	0:06	Texas	Mike Presley 12-yard touchdown run, Billy Schott kick good	7	41
4	7:34	4	33	1:00	Rice	Ardie Segars 25-yard touchdown reception from Claude Reed, 2-point pass failed	13	41
4	7:13	2	67	0:31	Texas	Mike Presely 5-yard touchdown run, Billy Schott kick good	13	48
4	3:32	6	29	2:52	Texas	Mike Presley 1-yard touchdown run, Billy Schott kick good	13	55
"TOP" = time of possession. For other American football terms, see Glossary of American football.							13	55

== Roster ==
1973 Texas Longhorns football team roster
Players
Coaches
Offense

Pos.	#	Name	Class
RB		Joe Aboussie	So
QB		Marty Akins
WR		Parker Alford
RB		Rene Amaya
RB		Dave Bartek
RB		Lonnie Bennett
RB		Raymond Clayborn
WR		Mike Cromeens
OL		Don Crosslin
LB		Greg Dahlberg
RB		Coy Featherston
RB		Mike Featherston
RB		Mike Hartinger
OL		Bruce Hebert
WR		Tommy Ingram
WR		Pat Kelly
RB		Pat Kennedy
RB		Tommy Landry
RB		Roosevelt Leaks
RB		Rucker Lewis
RB		Mickey Macaluso
WR		Jim Moore
WR		Pat Padgett
QB		Mike Presley
QB		Bob Riviere
OL		Bob Simmons
OL		Will Wilcox
OL		Jim Wyman

Defense

Pos.	#	Name	Class
DB		Jay Arnold
DB		Joe Bob Bizzell
DL		Fred Currin
DL		Doug English
LB		Glen Gaspard
LB		Wade Johnston
DB		Tommy Keel
LB		Sherman Lee
DB		Terry Melancon
DL		Malcolm Minnick
DL		Bill Rutherford
DL		Rico Thurman
DB		Gary Yeoman

Special teams

Pos.	#	Name	Class
P		Mike Dean
K		Billy Schott

Head coach

- Darrell Royal

Coordinators/assistant coaches

Legend

- (C) Team captain
- (S) Suspended
- (I) Ineligible
- Injured
- Redshirt
