= 1973 Texas Tech Red Raiders football team =

American college football season

1973 Texas Tech Red Raiders football

Gator Bowl, W 28–19 vs. Tennessee
- Conference: Southwest Conference

Ranking
- Coaches: No. 11
- AP: No. 11
- Record: 11–1 (6–1 SWC)
- Head coach: Jim Carlen (4th season)
- Offensive scheme: No-huddle option
- Defensive coordinator: Richard Bell (4th season)
- Base defense: 4–3
- Home stadium: Jones Stadium

1973 Southwest Conference football standings
	Conf.					Overall
Team	W		L		T	W		L		T
No. 14 Texas $	7	–	0	–	0	8	–	3	–	0
No. 11 Texas Tech	6	–	1	–	0	11	–	1	–	0
Rice	4	–	3	–	0	5	–	6	–	0
SMU	3	–	3	–	1	6	–	4	–	1
Arkansas	3	–	3	–	1	5	–	5	–	1
Texas A&M	3	–	4	–	0	5	–	6	–	0
TCU	1	–	6	–	0	3	–	8	–	0
Baylor	0	–	7	–	0	2	–	9	–	0
$ – Conference champion; Rankings from AP Poll

The 1973 Texas Tech Red Raiders football team represented Texas Tech University in the Southwest Conference (SWC) during the 1973 NCAA Division I football season. In their fourth season under head coach Jim Carlen, the Red Raiders compiled an 11–1 record (6–1 against conference opponents), finished in second place in the SWC, defeated Tennessee in the 1973 Gator Bowl, were ranked No. 11 in the final AP Poll, and outscored opponents by a combined total of 342 to 187. The team's statistical leaders included Joe Barnes with 978 passing yards and 568 rushing yards and Andre Tillman with 428 receiving yards. The team played its home games at Clifford B. & Audrey Jones Stadium.

== Schedule ==
Date	Opponent	Rank	Site	Result	Attendance	Source
September 15	Utah*	No. 20	Jones Stadium; Lubbock, TX	W 29–22	38,554	
September 22	New Mexico*		Jones Stadium; Lubbock, TX	W 41–7	30,218	
September 29	at No. 14 Texas		Memorial Stadium; Austin, TX (rivalry)	L 12–28	77,809	
October 6	at Oklahoma State*		Lewis Field; Stillwater, OK	W 20–7	41,000	
October 13	Texas A&M		Jones Stadium; Lubbock, TX (rivalry)	W 28–16	50,102	
October 20	at No. 19 Arizona*		Arizona Stadium; Tucson, AZ	W 31–17	40,172	
October 27	SMU^{†}	No. 18	Jones Stadium; Lubbock, TX	W 31–14	45,098	
November 3	Rice	No. 15	Jones Stadium; Lubbock, TX	W 19–6	37,400	
November 10	at TCU	No. 12	Amon G. Carter Stadium; Fort Worth, TX (rivalry)	W 24–10	25,029	
November 17	Baylor	No. 12	Jones Stadium; Lubbock, TX (rivalry)	W 55–24	35,102	
November 24	at Arkansas	No. 12	War Memorial Stadium; Little Rock, AR (rivalry)	W 24–17	42,061	
December 29	vs. No. 20 Tennessee*	No. 11	Gator Bowl Stadium; Jacksonville, FL (Gator Bowl)	W 28–19	62,109	
*Non-conference game; ^{†}Homecoming; Rankings from AP Poll released prior to the game

== Game summaries ==
=== At Texas ===
Texas Tech Red Raiders (2–0) at #14 Texas Longhorns (0–1)

Quarter	1	2	3	4	Total
Texas Tech	0	0	6	6	12
Texas	7	7	0	14	28

at Memorial Stadium, Austin, Texas

- Date: September 29, 1973
- Game time: 7:30 p.m.
- Game weather: 82 °F (28 °C)
- Game attendance: 77,809
- Box Score

Team	Category	Player	Statistics
Texas Tech	Passing		
Texas Tech	Rushing		
Texas Tech	Receiving		
Texas	Passing	Marty Akins	5/8, 73 Yds, INT
Texas	Rushing	Roosevelt Leaks	20 Rush, 89 Yds, TD
Texas	Receiving	Pat Kelly	3 Rec, 53 Yds

Scoring summary

Quarter	Time	Drive			Team	Scoring information	Score	
Quarter	Time	Plays	Yards	TOP	Team	Scoring information	TTU	UT
1	8:08	3	18	1:17	Texas	Roosevelt Leaks 15-yard touchdown run, Billy Schott kick good	0	7
2	14:08	13	86	5:37	Texas	Marty Akins 3-yard touchdown run, Billy Schott kick good	0	14
3	9:45	9	44	4:20	Texas Tech	Lawrence Williams 12-yard touchdown reception from Joe Barnes, kick no good	6	14
4	14:55	8	66	3:25	Texas Tech	James Mosley 21-yard touchdown run, 2-point run failed	12	14
4	8:15	13	70	6:40	Texas	Tommy Landry 3-yard touchdown run, Billy Schott kick good	12	21
4	8:15				Texas	Kickoff fumble recovery in end zone for touchdown by Jay Arnold, Billy Schott kick good	12	28
"TOP" = time of possession. For other American football terms, see Glossary of American football.							12	28

== Personnel ==
1973 Texas Tech Red Raiders football team roster
Players
Coaches
Offense

Pos.	#	Name	Class
G	65	Dennis Allen	Sr
QB	12	Joe Barnes	Sr
WR	49	Ricky Bates	So
QB	16	Jimmy Carmichael	Sr
OT	77	Freddie Chandler	Jr
TE	45	Pat Felux	So
C	61	Jim Frasure	So
OT	79	Tom Furguson	Sr
RB	35	John Garner	Jr
RB	34	Larry Isaac	Fr
WR	48	Jeff Jobe	Jr
WR	40	Calvin Jones	Jr
G	66	Floyd Keeney	Jr
WR	41	Willie Kent	So
FB	33	James Mosley	Sr
RB	32	Rufus Myers	So
RB	38	George Smith	Sr
TE	44	Andre Tillman	Sr
WR	42	Lawrence Williams	Jr

Defense

Pos.	#	Name	Class
DB	22	Gary Bartel	Jr
LB	57	Charlie Beery	Jr
DT	73	Brian Bernwanger	Sr
DT	74	Ecomet Burley	So
DE	81	Tommy Cones	Jr
DE	85	Larry Hamilton	So
LB	50	George Herro	Sr
DE	83	Thomas Howard Sr.	Fr
DE	84	Louis Jones	So
DB	26	Curtis Jordan	So
DE	52	David Knaus	Jr
DE	80	Aubrey McCain	Sr
DB	20	Randy Olson	Jr
LB	56	Tom Ryan	Sr
DB	21	Steve VanLoozen	Sr
DB	27	Kenneth Wallace	Sr
DB	23	Danny Willis	Sr

Special teams

Pos.	#	Name	Class
K	11	Don Grimes	Sr

Head coach

- Jim Carlen

Coordinators/assistant coaches

Legend

- (C) Team captain
- (S) Suspended
- (I) Ineligible
- Injured
- Redshirt
