= 1973 Arkansas Razorbacks football team =

American college football season

1973 Arkansas Razorbacks football
- Conference: Southwest Conference
- Record: 5–5–1 (3–3–1 SWC)
- Head coach: Frank Broyles (16th season)
- Captains: Nick Avlos; Jack Ettinger; Steve Hedgepeth; Dickey Morton; Danny Rhodes
- Home stadium: Razorback Stadium; War Memorial Stadium

1973 Southwest Conference football standings
	Conf.					Overall
Team	W		L		T	W		L		T
No. 14 Texas $	7	–	0	–	0	8	–	3	–	0
No. 11 Texas Tech	6	–	1	–	0	11	–	1	–	0
Rice	4	–	3	–	0	5	–	6	–	0
SMU	3	–	3	–	1	6	–	4	–	1
Arkansas	3	–	3	–	1	5	–	5	–	1
Texas A&M	3	–	4	–	0	5	–	6	–	0
TCU	1	–	6	–	0	3	–	8	–	0
Baylor	0	–	7	–	0	2	–	9	–	0
$ – Conference champion; Rankings from AP Poll

The 1973 Arkansas Razorbacks football team represented the University of Arkansas in the Southwest Conference (SWC) during the 1973 NCAA Division I football season. In their 16th year under head coach Frank Broyles, the Razorbacks compiled a 5–5–1 record (3–3–1 against SWC opponents), finished in a tie for fourth place in the SWC, and were outscored by their opponents by a combined total of 184 to 124.

Running back Dickey Morton averaged 118 yards per game on the ground, the ninth highest average in the nation.

== Schedule ==
Date	Opponent	Site	Result	Attendance	Source
September 15	at No. 1 USC*	Los Angeles Memorial Coliseum; Los Angeles, CA	L 0–17	73,231	
September 22	No. 17 Oklahoma State*	War Memorial Stadium; Little Rock, AR	L 6–38	45,683	
September 29	Iowa State*	Razorback Stadium; Fayetteville, AR	W 21–19	37,830	
October 6	TCU	War Memorial Stadium; Little Rock, AR	W 13–5	49,456	
October 13	at Baylor	Baylor Stadium; Waco, TX	W 13–7	28,000	
October 20	Texas	Razorback Stadium; Fayetteville, AR (rivalry)	L 6–34	45,348	
October 27	Tulsa*	War Memorial Stadium; Little Rock, AR	W 20–6	42,341	
November 3	Texas A&M	Razorback Stadium; Fayetteville, AR (rivalry)	W 14–10	37,261	
November 10	at Rice	Rice Stadium; Houston, TX	L 7–17	23,500	
November 17	at SMU	Cotton Bowl; Dallas, TX	T 7–7	18,712	
November 24	Texas Tech	War Memorial Stadium; Little Rock, AR (rivalry)	L 17–24	42,061	
*Non-conference game; Rankings from AP Poll released prior to the game

== Game summaries ==
=== TCU ===
Quarterback Mike Kirkland threw for one touchdown and ran for another in Arkansas' 15th straight win over TCU. It was the SWC opener for both teams.

=== Texas ===
Texas Longhorns (2–2) at Arkansas Razorbacks (3–2)

Quarter	1	2	3	4	Total
Texas	0	6	21	7	34
Arkansas	0	0	0	6	6

at Razorback Stadium, Fayetteville, Arkansas

- Date: October 20, 1973
- Game time: 2:00 p.m. CDT
- Game weather: Clear, 72 °F (22 °C)
- Game attendance: 45,348
- Box Score

Team	Category	Player	Statistics
Texas	Passing	Marty Akins	3/7, 38 Yds
Texas	Rushing	Roosevelt Leaks	24 Rush, 209 Yds, 3 TD
Texas	Receiving	Jim Moore	3 Rec, 27 Yds
Arkansas	Passing		
Arkansas	Rushing		
Arkansas	Receiving		

Scoring summary

Quarter	Time	Drive			Team	Scoring information	Score	
Quarter	Time	Plays	Yards	TOP	Team	Scoring information	UT	UA
2	5:42	18	84	8:33	Texas	Roosevelt Leaks 2-yard touchdown run, Billy Schott kick no good	6	0
3	12:08	6	77	2:52	Texas	Roosevelt Leaks 43-yard touchdown run, Billy Schott kick good	13	0
3	10:03				Texas	Punt returned 73 yards for touchdown by Rob Moore, Billy Schott kick good	20	0
3	1:49	1	59	0:09	Texas	Roosevelt Leaks 59-yard touchdown run, Billy Schott kick good	27	0
4	8:50	1	85	0:12	Texas	Raymond Clayborn 85-yard touchdown run, Billy Schott kick good	34	0
4	0:13				Arkansas	Blocked punt recovered in end zone for touchdown by Rollen Smith, kick no good	34	6
"TOP" = time of possession. For other American football terms, see Glossary of American football.							34	6

== Personnel ==
1973 Arkansas Razorbacks football team roster
Players
Coaches
Offense

Pos.	#	Name	Class
OL		Stan Audas
TE		Nick Avlos
RB		Teddy Barnes
QB		Larry Brown
WR		Reggie Craig
RB		Marvin Daily
RB		Freddie Douglas
OL		Randy Drake
WR		Jack Ettinger
RB		Rolland Fuchs
RB		Muskie Harris
RB		Hal Hirschfield
OL		Lee King
QB		Mike Kirkland	So
QB		Mark Miller
TE		Matt Morrison
RB		Dickey Morton
WR		Kelvin O'Brien
OL		Mike Parmer
OL		Gerald Skinner
OL		R.C. Thielemann
OL		Russ Tribble
RB		Alan Watson
RB		Marsh White

Defense

Pos.	#	Name	Class
LB		Billy Burns
DB		Bo Busby
DL		Danny Crawford
DL		Harvey Hampton
DB		Tommy Harris
DL		Ivan Jordan
DL		Brison Manor
LB		Hal McAfee
DB		Bruce Mitchell
DL		Jon Riddlehoover
LB		Danny Rhodes
DB		Rollen Smith
DB		Brad Thomas
DL		Dennis Winston

Special teams

Pos.	#	Name	Class
P		Tommy Cheyne

Head coach

- Frank Broyles

Coordinators/assistant coaches

Legend

- (C) Team captain
- (S) Suspended
- (I) Ineligible
- Injured
- Redshirt
