= Eddie Phillips (quarterback) =

American football player

No. 14
- Position: Quarterback

Personal information
- Listed height: 6 ft 0 in (1.83 m)
- Listed weight: 187 lb (85 kg)

Career information
- High school: Mesquite (Mesquite, Texas)
- College: Texas (1969–1971)

Awards and highlights
- 2× National champion (1969, 1970); Second-team All-SWC (1970); 1971 Cotton Bowl Offensive Outstanding Player; Cotton Bowl All-Decade Team Quarterback 1970's; Fewest passes had intercepted by a Longhorn in a career; Longest run by a Longhorn quarterback in a bowl game; Most rushing yards by a quarterback in a Cotton Bowl game

Eddie Phillips is an American former college football player who started at quarterback for the Texas Longhorns in the early 1970s. In 1970, he led the Longhorns to the national championship while leading the Southwest Conference in total touchdowns. Despite an award-winning, record-breaking performance in the 1971 Cotton Bowl, Texas lost, breaking its 30-game winning streak and handing the AP crown to Nebraska.

== Early life ==
Eddie Phillips played defensive back and quarterback for Mesquite High School. He was recruited by both Arkansas and Texas to play football and chose Texas

== College career ==
Eddie Phillips started his career sharing quarterback duties on the freshman team, nicknamed the Yearlings, with Monty Johnson. He helped lead them to a perfect 5–0 record and the unofficial freshman team Southwest Conference Championship.

Phillips developed into a classic option quarterback, and during his sophomore year he backed up James Street in Texas' National Championship season of 1969. He appeared in 8 games, but only in mop-up duty.

In 1970, he became the starting quarterback and led Texas to a share of the National Championship, winning the UPI (Coaches) Championship and sharing the NFF Championship with Ohio State. He led Texas to 10 straight wins and helped set the Southwest Conference and school record for most consecutive wins at 30. The Longhorns, still relying on the wishbone, were an almost unstoppable force. In the only regular season game in which they were challenged, Phillips hit Cotton Speyrer on a 3rd and 9, 45-yard touchdown pass with 12 seconds left to win the game, preserve the winning streak and keep Texas' Championship season on track.

In the 1971 Cotton Bowl, Texas faced #5 Notre Dame with the AP National Championship on the line. Phillips played the best game of his career and was named the offensive Outstanding Player. He became the first Longhorn quarterback to throw and run for over 100 yards in a bowl game; set the Cotton Bowl records for total offense and most rushing yards by a quarterback (which as of 2014 he still held); and rushed for more yards than any quarterback ever had in any prior bowl game, but it was not enough for the Longhorns to win. Texas fumbled the ball 9 times, with 5 of those being turnovers, and the Joe Theisman-led Fighting Irish beat Texas 24–11, giving a share of the national title to the Nebraska Cornhuskers.

In 1971, Phillips was again the starter for Texas, but he had an injury plagued season and was replaced several times by back-up Donnie Wigginton. Phillips missed six games with injuries to his hamstring, ribs and shoulder. He was replaced by Wigginton in the first game of the season against UCLA after re-injuring his hamstring which he originally injured in August, and again with the same injury during his return against Oregon. He didn't play his first complete game of the season until facing Baylor in early November. But the next week he left the TCU game in the 3rd quarter with an injured shoulder. Despite his many injuries he was the starter in the 1972 Cotton Bowl classic against Penn State, in which he shared quarterback duties with backup Wigginton. Many saw the game as a grudge match between the two teams who went undefeated in 1969, and Penn State dominated in a 30–6 win to avenge their denial of the 1969 National Championship.

Phillips played in the 1972 Hula Bowl.

Phillips finished with a 14–2 record as a starter and, at the time he graduated, he had the four top rushing games by a quarterback in Texas history. He was inducted into the Longhorn Hall of Honor in 2005.

=== Records ===
- UT – Highest Average Gain Per Pass Completion (min. 30 completions), season (17.8), surpassed by Randy McEachern in 1977
- UT – Longest run by a quarterback (63 yards), surpassed by Bret Stafford in 1985
- UT – Most rushing yards in a bowl game (164), surpassed by Ricky Williams in 1999
- UT – Most rushing yards by a Quarterback, game (164), broke his own record twice, surpassed by Marty Akins in 1974
- UT – Most rushing yards by a Quarterback, career (1,211), surpassed by Akins in 1974
- UT – Lowest Percentage of Passes Had Intercepted, season (3.1%), surpassed by Donnie Wigginton in 1971
- **UT – Fewest passes had intercepted, career – min 150 attempts (8)**
- UT – Total Offense, game (363), surpassed by Donnie Little in 1980
- **UT – Longest run by a quarterback in a bowl game (63 yards)**
- Cotton Bowl – Total Offense, game (363), surpassed by Graham Harrell in 2009
- **Cotton Bowl – Net rushing yards by a quarterback (164)**
- Bowl – Net rushing yards by a quarterback (164), surpassed by Mike Mosley of Texas A&M in the 1977 Bluebonnet Bowl

Bold means active

== Later life ==
Phillips was drafted 95th overall in the fourth round of the 1972 NFL draft by the Los Angeles Rams, but with the intention of turning him into a safety. During the pre-season he played in several games and during one, he collided with rookie running back Ray Jamieson of the Oakland Raiders. The collision broke Jamison's neck and ended his career. Phillips was waived just before the start of the season, one of the last players cut to make room on the roster for the start of the season.

After his career was over, Phillips married Tom Landry's daughter Kitty and became a banker in Austin.

In the 2014 movie My All American, Phillips is portrayed by actor Mike Seitz.
