= 1973 SMU Mustangs football team =

American college football season

1973 SMU Mustangs football
- Conference: Southwest Conference
- Record: 6–4–1 (3–3–1 SWC)
- Head coach: Dave Smith (1st season)
- Home stadium: Cotton Bowl; Texas Stadium

1973 Southwest Conference football standings
	Conf.					Overall
Team	W		L		T	W		L		T
No. 14 Texas $	7	–	0	–	0	8	–	3	–	0
No. 11 Texas Tech	6	–	1	–	0	11	–	1	–	0
Rice	4	–	3	–	0	5	–	6	–	0
SMU	3	–	3	–	1	6	–	4	–	1
Arkansas	3	–	3	–	1	5	–	5	–	1
Texas A&M	3	–	4	–	0	5	–	6	–	0
TCU	1	–	6	–	0	3	–	8	–	0
Baylor	0	–	7	–	0	2	–	9	–	0
$ – Conference champion; Rankings from AP Poll

The 1973 SMU Mustangs football team represented Southern Methodist University (SMU) as a member of the Southwest Conference (SWC) during the 1973 NCAA Division I football season. Led by first-year head coach Dave Smith, the Mustangs compiled an overall record of 6–4–1 with a mark of 3–3–1 in conference play, tying for fourth place in the SWC.

== Schedule ==
Date	Opponent	Rank	Site	Result	Attendance	Source
September 15	Santa Clara*		Texas Stadium; Irving, TX	W 49–7	13,997	
September 22	at Oregon State*		Parker Stadium; Corvallis, OR	W 35–16	26,189	
September 29	Virginia Tech*		Texas Stadium; Irving, TX	W 37–6	13,683	
October 6	No. 15 Missouri*	No. 19	Texas Stadium; Irving, TX	L 7–17	19,675	
October 20	at Rice		Rice Stadium; Houston, TX (rivalry)	W 27–16	25,000	
October 27	at No. 18 Texas Tech		Jones Stadium; Lubbock, TX	L 14–31	45,098	
November 3	No. 20 Texas		Cotton Bowl; Dallas, TX	L 14–42	35,096	
November 10	at Texas A&M		Kyle Field; College Station, TX	L 10–45	37,180	
November 17	Arkansas		Cotton Bowl; Dallas, TX	T 7–7	18,712	
November 24	at Baylor		Baylor Stadium; Waco, TX	W 38–22	23,000	
December 1	TCU		Cotton Bowl; Dallas, TX (rivalry)	W 21–19	18,572	
*Non-conference game; Rankings from AP Poll released prior to the game

== Roster ==
1973 SMU Mustangs football team roster
Players
Coaches
Offense

Pos.	#	Name	Class
RB	32	Brian Duncan	Jr
WR	15	Kenny Harrison	So
WR	80	Freeman Johns	So
RB	25	Wayne Morris	So
TE	88	Oscar Roan	Jr
G	65	Henry Sheppard	So

Defense

Pos.	#	Name	Class
DT	72	Louie Kelcher	Jr
LB	59	Ted Thompson	Jr

Special teams

Pos.	#	Name	Class

Head coach

- Dave Smith

Coordinators/assistant coaches

Legend

- (C) Team captain
- (S) Suspended
- (I) Ineligible
- Injured
- Redshirt
