= Donnie Wigginton =

American football player

No. 18
- Position: Quarterback

Personal information
- Born: December 30, 1948 (age 77); Houston, Texas, U.S.
- Listed height: 5 ft 8 in (1.73 m)
- Listed weight: 163 lb (74 kg)

Career information
- High school: Spring Branch
- College: Texas (1969–1971)

Awards and highlights
- 2× National champion (1969, 1970)

Donnie Wigginton (born December 30, 1948) is an American former football player who started as quarterback for the Texas Longhorns in the early 1970s. Though a quarterback, he is best known for one single catch when, as a holder, he snagged a bad snap on the game winning extra-point in the so-called "Game of the Century" versus Arkansas. His hold, and the kick, were good and Texas went on to win the National Championship. He later became a football coach at rival Texas A&M.

== Early life ==
In 1966, Don Wigginton led Spring Branch to the AAAA State Championship game where it lost to San Angelo 21–14.

== College career ==
In 1969, Wigginton was the third-string quarterback behind James Street and Eddie Phillips. He played quarterback in seven games, but his most notable play that season – and possibly in his career – came in the so-called "Game of the Century" against Arkansas when he was the holder. In that game, a de facto National Championship game between #1 Texas and #2 Arkansas, Wigginton came in to hold the extra point kick with the game tied 14–14. He handled a bad snap, and Happy Feller booted the extra point for the win and the consensus National Title.

In 1970, Wigginton's senior year, he backed up Phillips but saw only spot play, getting into only eight games.

In the spring of 1971 Wigginton, by then married with a child, turned down an offer to give up his last year of eligibility to coach at West Texas State and instead returned to back up Phillips again. He got his first career start against Texas Tech when Phillips re-injured his hamstring against UCLA and he led the #3 Longhorns to victory. The next week against Oregon, Phillips again injured his hamstring and Wigginton came off the bench to play the last three quarters in a 35–7 rout. He started the following week against #7 Oklahoma and scored two touchdowns, but left the game in the 3rd quarter with a separated rib and the Longhorns down by 10. Texas would lose and fall to #10 in the rankings. Wigginton then started the next three games, losing to #16 Arkansas and then reeling off back to back wins against Rice and SMU. Phillips was back as the starter against Baylor, but the next week against TCU Wiggington again came in for Phillips when Phillips went down in the third quarter with an injured shoulder. Wigginton rushed for 60 yards and two touchdowns, and turned a 7–0 nail-biter into a 31–0 rout. He then started the last game of the season against Texas A&M, scored two touchdowns and helped Texas secure another Southwest Conference Championship. He shared quarterback duties in the Cotton Bowl with starter Phillips in a 30–6 loss to Penn State, who was determined to avenge their denial of the 1969 National Championship.

Despite sharing quarterback duties with Phillips, Wigginton ended the year as the Southwest Conference leader in touchdowns from scrimmage and tied the school record for the same. He ended his career with a 4–2 record as a starter.

=== Records ===
- UT – Most touchdowns, season (14), tied Len Barrell, Byron Townsend and Steve Worster, tied by Roosevelt Leaks, surpassed by Earl Campbell in 1977
- UT – Most rushing touchdowns by a quarterback, season (14), surpassed by Sam Ehlinger in 2018
- UT – Lowest Percentage of Passes Had Intercepted, season (3.0%), surpassed by James Brown in 1994

== Later life ==
Immediately after the 1972 Cotton Bowl, he went with Texas Offensive Coordinator Emory Bellard to Texas A&M to become a freshman coach. He later rose to the job of offensive backs coach. After six seasons he retired to return to Austin and go into the commercial real estate business and coached at several schools in the Austin Area.

He married Judy Smith Stephens December 4, 1999 and divorced in 2015.
