= 1973 Texas A&M Aggies football team =

American college football season

1973 Texas A&M Aggies football
- Conference: Southwest Conference
- Record: 5–6 (3–4 SWC)
- Head coach: Emory Bellard (2nd season)
- Offensive coordinator: Ben Hurt (2nd season)
- Offensive scheme: Wishbone
- Defensive coordinator: Melvin Robertson (2nd season)
- Home stadium: Kyle Field

1973 Southwest Conference football standings
	Conf.					Overall
Team	W		L		T	W		L		T
No. 14 Texas $	7	–	0	–	0	8	–	3	–	0
No. 11 Texas Tech	6	–	1	–	0	11	–	1	–	0
Rice	4	–	3	–	0	5	–	6	–	0
SMU	3	–	3	–	1	6	–	4	–	1
Arkansas	3	–	3	–	1	5	–	5	–	1
Texas A&M	3	–	4	–	0	5	–	6	–	0
TCU	1	–	6	–	0	3	–	8	–	0
Baylor	0	–	7	–	0	2	–	9	–	0
$ – Conference champion; Rankings from AP Poll

The 1973 Texas A&M Aggies football team represented Texas A&M University as a member of the Southwest Conference (SWC) during the 1973 NCAA Division I football season. Led by second-year head coach Emory Bellard, the Aggies compiled an overall record of 5–6 with a mark of 3–4 in conference play, placing sixth in the SWC. Texas A&M played home games at Kyle Field in College Station, Texas.

== Schedule ==
Date	Opponent	Site	Result	Attendance	Source
September 15	Wichita State*	Kyle Field; College Station, TX	W 48–0	31,474	
September 22	at No. 11 LSU*	Tiger Stadium; Baton Rouge, LA (rivalry)	L 23–28	68,394	
September 29	Boston College*	Kyle Field; College Station, TX	L 24–32	36,317	
October 6	at Clemson*	Memorial Stadium; Clemson, SC	W 30–15	30,000	
October 13	at Texas Tech	Jones Stadium; Lubbock, TX (rivalry)	L 16–28	50,102	
October 20	at TCU	Amon G. Carter Stadium; Fort Worth, TX	W 35–16	32,010	
October 27	Baylor	Kyle Field; College Station, TX (rivalry)	W 28–22	44,182	
November 3	at Arkansas	Razorback Stadium; Fayetteville, AR (rivalry)	L 10–14	37,261	
November 10	SMU	Kyle Field; College Station, TX	W 45–10	37,180	
November 17	at Rice	Rice Stadium; Houston, TX	L 20–24	45,000	
November 22	No. 11 Texas	Kyle Field; College Station, TX (rivalry)	L 13–42	53,000	
*Non-conference game; Rankings from AP Poll released prior to the game

== Roster ==
1973 Texas A&M Aggies football team roster
Players
Coaches
Offense

Pos.	#	Name	Class
RB	44	Bubba Bean	So

Defense

Pos.	#	Name	Class
LB		Ed Simonini	So
LB		Garth Ten Napel

Special teams

Pos.	#	Name	Class

Head coach

- Emory Bellard

Coordinators/assistant coaches

Legend

- (C) Team captain
- (S) Suspended
- (I) Ineligible
- Injured
- Redshirt
