= Pat Ragusa =

American football player (born 1963)

No. 11
- Position: Placekicker

Personal information
- Born: March 17, 1963 (age 63); Caracas, Venezuela
- Listed height: 5 ft 8 in (1.73 m)
- Listed weight: 180 lb (82 kg)

Career information
- High school: East Rockaway (East Rockaway, New York, U.S.)
- College: St. John's (1981–1983, 1985)
- NFL draft: 1986: undrafted

Career history
- Brooklyn Mariners (1984); New York Jets (1986–1987); Connecticut Giants (1987); New York Knights (1988)

Career NFL statistics
- Games played: 3
- Stats at Pro Football Reference

Patrick Agatino Ragusa (born March 17, 1963) is a Venezuelan-born former professional American football placekicker who played for the New York Jets of the National Football League (NFL). Born to Italian immigrants in Caracas, Venezuela, he spent most of his childhood in Sicily, Italy, before moving to the United States. He played college football for the St. John's Redmen and played three games for the Jets as a replacement player in 1987. He was also a member of the semi-professional Brooklyn Mariners and Connecticut Giants and had a stint with the New York Knights of the Arena Football League (AFL).

== Early life ==
Ragusa was born on March 17, 1963, in Caracas, Venezuela. He is one of only four Venezuelan-born National Football League (NFL) players, along with fellow placekickers Alan Pringle, Andrés Borregales, and José Borregales. Ragusa's parents were immigrants from Sicily, and when he was age two, his family moved back. He lived the next 10 years in the comune of Limina, with a population of 1,500. He played soccer growing up, later saying that "I remember going from sunrise to sunset playing soccer in the street."

Due to economic issues, Ragusa's father left for the United States, and five years later brought Ragusa and his brother to the U.S. as well. He settled in New York but was unable to speak any English at the time; he said the first two words he learned were "hello" and "kick." He played several sports with local youth teams and said that he "dominate[d] every sport where you had to kick a ball. Soccer, football, kickball – kids always picked me first for their teams." While in New York, he learned of American football and watched games of the New York Jets. He became interested in the position of placekicker and practiced by kicking balls over power lines. Ragusa attended East Rockaway High School and tried out for the school's junior varsity team. He performed well enough at his tryout that he was put on the varsity team.

== College career ==
After Ragusa graduated from East Rockaway, he enrolled at St. John's University in Queens in 1981. He immediately won the starting job for the St. John's Redmen football team as a freshman. In a game against Iona that year, he threw a five-yard touchdown pass to the holder after recovering a bobbled snap. He helped the 1981 St. John's team compile a record of 8–2 while winning the Metropolitan Intercollegiate Conference championship. He converted 12 of 20 extra point attempts during the 1981 season and then was a perfect 33 for 33 in 1982, helping St. John's repeat as conference champion with a 9–1 record, while Ragusa was selected to the league all-star team.

Ragusa remained starter in 1983, setting the school record for consecutive extra points made with 50 before missing an attempt against Pace. He was named all-conference at the end of the season and helped St. John's win their third-straight league title with a record of 9–2. He was kicked off the team prior to the 1984 season, due to missing the team's mandatory off-season weightlifting program. He later told the Asbury Park Press that "I'm a natural. I didn't believe in weights."

While off the team in 1984, Ragusa played semi-professional football for the Brooklyn Mariners. With the team, his longest field goal made was 49 yards. He helped them reach the league championship, where they lost to the defending champion New Jersey Rams. Ragusa returned to St. John's in 1985. To fulfill the weightlifting requirements, Ragusa said "I worked it out. I would sign in at the weight room, do five push-ups and sign out." The 1985 St. John's team compiled a record of 5–5.

== Professional career and later life ==
After going unselected in the 1986 NFL draft, Ragusa received a tryout from the New York Jets on the suggestion of Dennis Bligen, a Jets running back who had played with Ragusa at St. John's. Although he did not earn a contract at his first tryout, he returned two months later and following a successful performance, was signed on July 18, 1986. He appeared in preseason for the team, making each of his three extra point attempts, but was released on August 19, in favor of veteran Pat Leahy.

Ragusa was signed again for the 1987 season and competed with Leahy for the Jets' kicking job. Although he did not miss a kick in preseason, he was again released in favor of Leahy, on August 27, 1987. After being released, Ragusa joined the semi-pro Connecticut Giants of the Continental Interstate Football League (CIFL). During this time, he also worked as a gas station attendant. On September 23, he was re-signed by the Jets during the 1987 NFL strike as a replacement player. He made his NFL debut in the team's Week 4 game against the Dallas Cowboys, converting all three of his extra point attempts and his only field goal attempt in a 38–24 loss. He appeared in two further games, missing both of his field goal attempts in a 6–0 loss to the Indianapolis Colts in Week 5, and then making all four extra point attempts and his one field goal attempt in a 37–31 win over the Miami Dolphins in Week 6. He was released on October 19, at the end of the strike, in favor of the returning Leahy, ending his three-game stint with the team having made all seven extra point attempts and two of four field goal attempts, with a long of 34 yards.

Ragusa re-joined the semi-professional Connecticut Giants following his stint with the Jets. He joined the New York Knights of the Arena Football League (AFL) for the 1988 season, but suffered a groin pull prior to the season opener and was placed on injured reserve. He was later waived by the Knights on June 23, 1988. After Ragusa's football career ended, he worked for a time with East Rockaway High School as a special teams consultant.
