= 1973 Baylor Bears football team =

American college football season

1973 Baylor Bears football
- Conference: Southwest Conference
- Record: 2–9 (0–7 SWC)
- Head coach: Grant Teaff (2nd season)
- Offensive coordinator: George Kirk
- Home stadium: Baylor Stadium

1973 Southwest Conference football standings
	Conf.					Overall
Team	W		L		T	W		L		T
No. 14 Texas $	7	–	0	–	0	8	–	3	–	0
No. 11 Texas Tech	6	–	1	–	0	11	–	1	–	0
Rice	4	–	3	–	0	5	–	6	–	0
SMU	3	–	3	–	1	6	–	4	–	1
Arkansas	3	–	3	–	1	5	–	5	–	1
Texas A&M	3	–	4	–	0	5	–	6	–	0
TCU	1	–	6	–	0	3	–	8	–	0
Baylor	0	–	7	–	0	2	–	9	–	0
$ – Conference champion; Rankings from AP Poll

The 1973 Baylor Bears football team was an American football team that represented Baylor University as a member of the Southwest Conference (SWC) during the 1973 NCAA Division I football season. In their second year under head coach Grant Teaff, the team compiled an overall record of 2–9, with a mark of 0–7 in conference play, and finished eighth in the SWC.

== Schedule ==
Date	Opponent	Site	Result	Attendance	Source
September 15	No. 11 Oklahoma*	Baylor Stadium; Waco, TX	L 14–42	41,573	
September 22	at Pittsburgh*	Pitt Stadium; Pittsburgh, PA	W 20–14	28,332	
September 29	at Colorado*	Folsom Field; Boulder, CO	L 28–52	48,041	
October 6	Florida State*	Baylor Stadium; Waco, TX	W 21–14	22,000–22,025	
October 13	Arkansas	Baylor Stadium; Waco, TX	L 7–13	28,000	
October 27	at Texas A&M	Kyle Field; College Station, TX (rivalry)	L 22–28	44,182	
November 3	TCU^{†}	Baylor Stadium; Waco, TX (rivalry)	L 28–34	30,257	
November 10	at No. 13 Texas	Memorial Stadium; Austin, TX (rivalry)	L 6–42	64,500	
November 17	at No. 12 Texas Tech	Jones Stadium; Lubbock, TX (rivalry)	L 24–55	35,102	
November 24	SMU	Baylor Stadium; Waco, TX	L 22–38	23,000	
December 1	at Rice	Rice Stadium; Houston, TX	L 0–27	14,000	
*Non-conference game; ^{†}Homecoming; Rankings from AP Poll released prior to the game

== Personnel ==
1973 Baylor Bears football team roster
Players
Coaches
Offense

Pos.	#	Name	Class
QB		Robert Armstrong
RB		Steve Beaird
QB		Randy Cavender
WR		Charles Dancer
OL		Cary Dorman
RB		Cleveland Franklin
OL		Gary Gregory
TE		Sam Harper
OL		Mike Hughes
WR		Alcy Jackson
QB		Neal Jeffrey
RB		Phillip Kent
RB		Brian Kilgore
RB		Gary Lacy
OL		Rich Mason
RB		Pat McNeil
OL		Tim Mills
OL		Allen Pittman
RB		Marcus Rogers
OL		Aubrey Schulz
WR		Ricky Thompson
OL		Rell Tipton
TE		Ken Townsend
RB		Godfrey White
RB		Billy Wilson

Defense

Pos.	#	Name	Class
DL		Jim Arnold
DL		Mike Black
LB		Tim Black
LB		Don Bockhorn
DB		Don Drake
DB		Les Ealey
DB		Gary Green
DL		Joe Johnson
LB		Derrell Luce
DL		John Oliver
DL		Phil Perry
DB		Ken Queensberry
DB		Keith Stone
DB		Tom Turnipseede
DL		Coy Zunker

Special teams

Pos.	#	Name	Class

Head coach

- Grant Teaff

Coordinators/assistant coaches

- George Kirk (OC)

Legend

- (C) Team captain
- (S) Suspended
- (I) Ineligible
- Injured
- Redshirt
