= 1973 TCU Horned Frogs football team =

American college football season

1973 TCU Horned Frogs football
- Conference: Southwest Conference
- Record: 3–8 (1–6 SWC)
- Head coach: Billy Tohill (3rd season)
- Offensive coordinator: Russell Coffee (3rd season)
- Offensive scheme: Spread
- Base defense: 5–2
- Home stadium: Amon G. Carter Stadium

1973 Southwest Conference football standings
	Conf.					Overall
Team	W		L		T	W		L		T
No. 14 Texas $	7	–	0	–	0	8	–	3	–	0
No. 11 Texas Tech	6	–	1	–	0	11	–	1	–	0
Rice	4	–	3	–	0	5	–	6	–	0
SMU	3	–	3	–	1	6	–	4	–	1
Arkansas	3	–	3	–	1	5	–	5	–	1
Texas A&M	3	–	4	–	0	5	–	6	–	0
TCU	1	–	6	–	0	3	–	8	–	0
Baylor	0	–	7	–	0	2	–	9	–	0
$ – Conference champion; Rankings from AP Poll

The 1973 TCU Horned Frogs football team represented Texas Christian University (TCU) in the 1973 NCAA Division I football season. The Horned Frogs finished the season 3–8 overall and 1–6 in the Southwest Conference. The team was coached by Billy Tohill, in his third and final year as head coach. The Frogs played their home games in Amon G. Carter Stadium, which is located on campus in Fort Worth, Texas.

== Schedule ==
Date	Time	Opponent	Site	Result	Attendance	Source
September 22	7:30 p.m.	UT Arlington*	Amon G. Carter Stadium; Fort Worth, TX	W 49–13	18,930	
September 29	1:30 p.m.	at No. 3 Ohio State*	Ohio Stadium; Columbus, OH	L 3–37	87,439	
October 6		at Arkansas	War Memorial Stadium; Little Rock, AR	L 5–13	49,456	
October 13		Idaho*	Amon G. Carter Stadium; Fort Worth, TX	W 30–14	15,110	
October 20		Texas A&M	Amon G. Carter Stadium; Fort Worth, TX (rivalry)	L 16–35	32,010	
October 27		at No. 14 Tennessee*	Neyland Stadium; Knoxville, TN	L 7–39	66,356	
November 3		at Baylor	Baylor Stadium; Waco, TX (rivalry)	W 34–28	30,257	
November 10		No. 12 Texas Tech	Amon G. Carter Stadium; Fort Worth, TX (rivalry)	L 10–24	25,029	
November 17	2:00 p.m.	at No. 11 Texas	Memorial Stadium; Austin, TX (rivalry)	L 7–52	50,000	
November 24		Rice	Amon G. Carter Stadium; Fort Worth, TX	L 9–14	12,827	
December 1		at SMU	Cotton Stadium; Dallas, TX (rivalry)	L 19–21	18,572	
*Non-conference game; Rankings from AP Poll released prior to the game; All times are in Central time

== Game summaries ==
=== At Ohio State ===
TCU Horned Frogs (1–0) at #3 Ohio State Buckeyes (1–0)

Quarter	1	2	3	4	Total
TCU	0	3	0	0	3
Ohio State	14	17	0	6	37

at Ohio Stadium, Columbus, Ohio

- Date: September 29
- Game time: 1:30 p.m.
- Game weather: Rain, 78 °F (26 °C)
- Game attendance: 87,439

Game information

First quarter

- OSU – Archie Griffin 68-yard run (Blair Conway kick), 12:17. Ohio State 7–0. Drive:
- OSU – Champ Henson 1-yard run (Blair Conway kick), 4:42. Ohio State 14–0. Drive: 69 yards.

Second quarter

- TCU – Berl Simmons 23-yard field goal, 9:18. Ohio State 14–3. Drive:
- OSU – Cornelius Greene 72-yard run (Blair Conway kick), 9:02. Ohio State 21–3. Drive:
- OSU – Cornelius Greene 8-yard run (Blair Conway kick), 2:33. Ohio State 28–3. Drive:
- OSU – Blair Conway 37-yard field goal, 0:00. Ohio State 31–3. Drive:

Third quarter

- No scoring

Fourth quarter

- OSU – Fred Pagac 13-yard pass from Greg Hare (kick failed), 6:25. Ohio State 37–3. Drive:

Top passers

- TCU – Kent Marshall – 7/17, 54 yards
- OSU – Cornelius Greene – 3/6, 34 yards, INT

Top rushers

- TCU – Mike Luttrell – 14 rushes, 44 yards
- OSU – Archie Griffin – 14 rushes, 119 yards, TD

Top receivers

- TCU — John Ott – 2 receptions, 20 yards
- OSU – Ted Powell – 1 reception, 22 yards

== Personnel ==
1973 TCU Horned Frogs football team roster
Players
Coaches
Offense

Pos.	#	Name	Class
OL		Leon Bartlett
OL		Sid Bond
RB		Chuck Boyd
OL		Terry Champagne
QB		Lee Cook
RB		Bobby Cowan
WR		Dave Duncan
RB		Rick Isel
TE		Alan Layne
RB		Ronnie Littleton
RB		Mike Luttrell
QB		Kent Marshall
OL		Johnny McWilliams
TE		John Ott
WR		Gary Patterson
WR		Steve Patterson
WR		Dicky Powers
RB		Tim Pullman
RB		Danny Scott
QB		Perry Senn
RB		Kent Waldrep
OL		Merle Wang
RB		Ronnie Webb

Defense

Pos.	#	Name	Class
DL		Charlie Davis
LB		Mike Hanna
DB		Gene Hernandez
DB		Allen Hooker
DB		Dennis McGehee
LB		Gene Moser
DL		Rusty Putt
DL		Ed Robinson
LB		Dede Terveen
DL		Tommy Van Wart
DB		Gary Whitman

Special teams

Pos.	#	Name	Class
K		Berl Simmons

Head coach

- Billy Tohill

Coordinators/assistant coaches

Legend

- (C) Team captain
- (S) Suspended
- (I) Ineligible
- Injured
- Redshirt
