= Andy Borregales =

American football player (born 2002)

Andrés Borregales
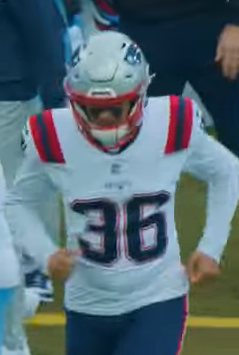
- Borregales with the New England Patriots in 2025

No. 8 – New England Patriots
- Position: Placekicker
- Roster status: Active

Personal information
- Born: January 2, 2003 (age 23); Caracas, Venezuela
- Listed height: 5 ft 11 in (1.80 m)
- Listed weight: 202 lb (92 kg)

Career information
- High school: Chaminade–Madonna (Hollywood, Florida, U.S.)
- College: Miami (FL) (2021–2024)
- NFL draft: 2025: 6th round, 182nd overall pick

Career history
- New England Patriots (2025–present)

Awards and highlights
- PFWA All-Rookie Team (2025); 2× First-team All-ACC (2023, 2024)

Career NFL statistics as of Week 7, 2026
- Field goals made: 36
- Field goals attempted: 43
- Field goal %: 83.7%
- Extra points made: 70
- Extra points attempted: 73
- Extra point %: 95.9%
- Points: 178
- Longest field goal: 59
- Touchbacks: 28
- Stats at Pro Football Reference

Andrés "Andy" Borregales (bore-eh-GAH-les; born January 2, 2003) is a Venezuelan-American professional American football kicker for the New England Patriots of the National Football League (NFL). He played college football for the Miami Hurricanes and was selected by the Patriots in the sixth round of the 2025 NFL draft.

== Early life ==
Borregales was born in Caracas, Venezuela, and immigrated to the United States with his family at the age of one. Borregales attended Chaminade–Madonna College Preparatory School in Hollywood, Florida. He went seven for nine on his field goal attempts as a sophomore and finished his high school career with a long of 56 yards. He committed to play college football for the Miami Hurricanes.

== College career ==
Heading into his freshman season in 2021, Borregales was named the Hurricanes starting kicker and kickoff specialist. He finished the 2021 season hitting 17 out of his 21 field goals and all 45 of his extra points attempts. In week 10 of the 2022 season, Borregales hit four field goals in an overtime win over Virginia. In 2022, he went 17 for 20 on his field goal attempts and converted on all 35 of his extra points. In week 9 of the 2023 season, Borregales hit three 45-plus yard field goals including a game-tying 48-yard field goal to force overtime in a win over Virginia. He finished the 2023 season converting on 22 of his 26 field goal attempts and 44 of his 45 extra points. In week 5 of the 2024 season, Borregales hit a career-long 56-yard field goal in a win over Virginia Tech. He finished his final collegiate season in 2024, going 18 for 19 on his field goals, while also making all 62 of his extra point attempts.

== Professional career ==
Pre-draft measurables
| Height | Weight | Arm length | Hand span | Wingspan |
|---|---|---|---|---|
| 5 ft 10 7/8 in (1.80 m) | 199 lb (90 kg) | 28 7/8 in (0.73 m) | 8 1/4 in (0.21 m) | 5 ft 11 1/4 in (1.81 m) |
All values from NFL Combine

Borregales was selected by the New England Patriots with the 182nd pick in the sixth round of the 2025 NFL draft. He was the first kicker taken in the draft and became the fourth Venezuelan born NFL player, along with fellow placekickers Alan Pringle, Pat Ragusa, and Borregales' elder brother José. During preseason, Borregales beat out John Parker Romo for the starting kicking job.

In Week 5 against the Buffalo Bills, Borregales hit a 52-yard game-winning field goal in the 23–20 win with 15 seconds left. In Week 12, he converted all four field goals and both extra points in a 26–20 win over the Cincinnati Bengals, earning AFC Special Teams Player of the Week. In Week 18, Borregales set a new career-long 59-yard field goal in the 38–10 victory over the Miami Dolphins. In the 2025 season, Borregales made 27 of 32 field goal attempts (84%) and 53 of 55 extra point attempts (96%). In the 2025 AFC Championship against the Denver Broncos, Borregales converted the only successful field goal in the game, helping the Patriots to a 10–7 win. Borregales played in Super Bowl LX, converting on his only extra point attempt in a 29–13 loss to the Seattle Seahawks.

== Personal life ==
Borregales is a Christian. He is married to Stephanie Borregales.

Borregales's older brother, José Borregales, also attended Miami and won a Lou Groza Award after three seasons at Florida International University. José was briefly on the rosters of the Tampa Bay Buccaneers, Orlando Guardians, and Winnipeg Blue Bombers.

While growing up, Borregales "looked up to" kicker Adam Vinatieri, who played ten seasons with the Patriots.
