= Sam Ehlinger =

American football player (born 1998)

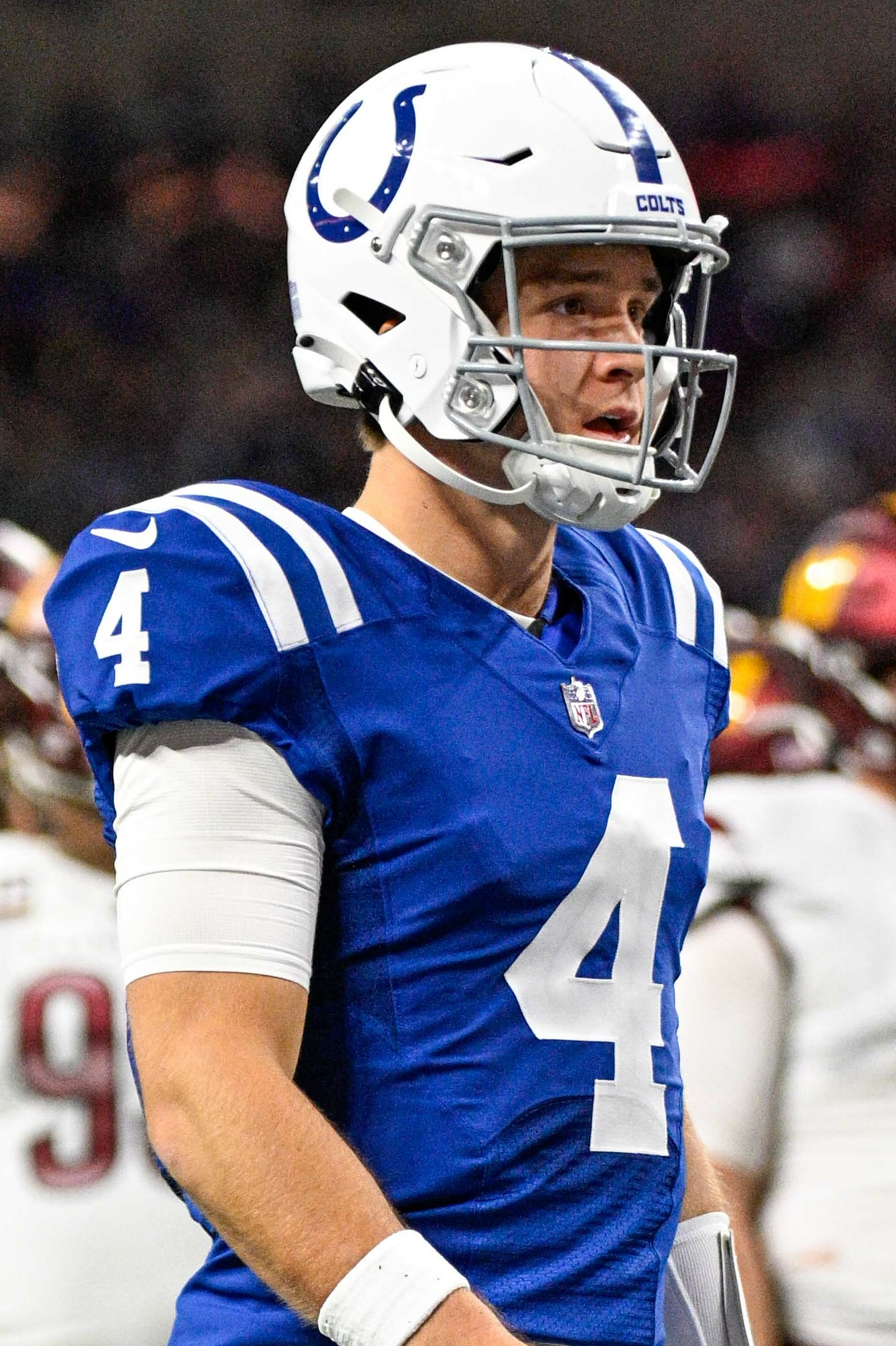
- Ehlinger with the Indianapolis Colts in 2022

No. 4 – Denver Broncos
- Position: Quarterback
- Roster status: Active

Personal information
- Born: September 30, 1998 (age 28); Austin, Texas, U.S.
- Listed height: 6 ft 1 in (1.85 m)
- Listed weight: 222 lb (101 kg)

Career information
- High school: Westlake (Austin)
- College: Texas (2017–2020)
- NFL draft: 2021: 6th round, 218th overall pick

Career history
- Indianapolis Colts (2021–2024); Denver Broncos (2025–present)

Awards and highlights
- Second-team All-Big 12 (2020); 2019 Sugar Bowl MVP; 2019 Alamo Bowl Offensive MVP

Career NFL statistics as of 2025
- Passing attempts: 101
- Passing completions: 64
- Completion percentage: 63.4%
- TD–INT: 3–3
- Passing yards: 573
- Passer rating: 76.1
- Rushing yards: 96
- Stats at Pro Football Reference

Samuel George Ehlinger (/ˈɛlɪŋɡər/ EL-in-gər; born September 30, 1998) is an American professional football quarterback for the Denver Broncos of the National Football League (NFL). He previously played for the Indianapolis Colts. He played college football for the Texas Longhorns, where he led the team to the 2018 Big 12 Championship Game and two bowl games. The Indianapolis Colts selected him in the sixth round of the 2021 NFL draft.

== Early life ==
Ehlinger attended and played quarterback for Westlake High School in Austin, Texas, where he was coached by Todd Dodge. Ehlinger graduated as the school's all-time leader in passing yards and touchdowns, surpassing Super Bowl-winning quarterbacks Drew Brees and Nick Foles. He was named the MaxPreps National Junior of the Year after his junior season, and was rated by Rivals.com as a four-star recruit, and received offers from Florida State, Houston, McNeese State, Oklahoma State, SMU, Texas Tech, and Wyoming, as well as his hometown team of Texas. He committed to play football at the University of Texas at Austin on July 28, 2015.

College recruiting
Name	Hometown	School	Height	Weight	Commit date
Sam Ehlinger; QB	Austin, Texas	Westlake High School	6 ft 3 in (1.91 m)	222 lb (101 kg)	Jul 28, 2015
Sam Ehlinger; QB	Recruit ratings: Scout: Rivals: 247Sports: (83)				
Overall recruit ranking:
Note: In many cases, Scout, Rivals, 247Sports, On3, and ESPN may conflict in their listings of height and weight.; In these cases, the average was taken. ESPN grades are on a 100-point scale.; Sources: "2017 Texas Football Commitment List". Rivals.; "2017 Team Ranking". Rivals.com.

== College career ==
=== 2017 season ===
Ehlinger joined the Texas Longhorns under new head coach Tom Herman, who inherited an offense led by sophomore starting quarterback Shane Buechele. Addressing competition between Ehlinger and Buechele for the starting quarterback position for the 2017 season during spring practice, offensive coordinator Tim Beck described Buechele as having quicker adaptability than Ehlinger. During the spring game on April 15, Ehlinger played on the second-team offense against the first-team defense, scoring a touchdown and passing for 148 yards. Through spring and much of summer practice, coach Herman did not explicitly declare a starting quarterback for the season, though by late August he had hinted that Buechele would be starting, citing his experience. The depth chart for Texas' opening game against Maryland on September 2, Ehlinger was listed as the second-string quarterback. He did not see playing action in the eventual 51–41 loss to Maryland; however, Buechele injured his throwing shoulder over the course of the game, resulting in Ehlinger taking practice repetitions with first-team starters following the game.

After Buechele was ultimately sidelined due to injury, Ehlinger made his first career start for Texas on September 9, 2017, against the San Jose State Spartans, leading the team to a 56–0 victory with 222 passing yards and a passing touchdown alongside 48 rushing yards. This made him just the tenth freshman to start a game at quarterback for the university. The starting quarterback role remained unsettled during the following week as Buechele was able to practice with the team while recovering from his shoulder injury. Ehlinger was eventually selected as the starter against #4 USC Trojans, completing 21 of 40 passes and two touchdowns in the double overtime loss. Ehlinger was able to connect with wide receiver Armanti Foreman on a 17-yard touchdown pass with 45 seconds remaining in regulation to give the Longhorns a late lead before the Trojans equalized with a field goal to send the game into overtime. However, Ehlinger fumbled the ball in the second overtime period, allowing USC to win on a second field goal. His 298-yard passing effort was the second-most by a true freshman in university history.

A healthy Buechele reclaimed the starting quarterback role against the Iowa State Cyclones to open Big 12 Conference play, though Ehlinger did not take any snaps despite Buechele suffering an ankle injury during the subsequent victory. However, given the severity of Buechele's injury, Ehlinger started at quarterback for the Longhorns against the Kansas State Wildcats, leading Texas to a 40–34 double overtime victory. His 30 completions, 50 passing attempts, 380 passing yards, and 107 rushing yards marked personal highs for 2017. The 380 passing yards were the most by a true freshman at Texas and the tenth most of any quarterback at the school, while the 487 total yardage was the third most in school history. Ehlinger was named the Earl Campbell Tyler Rose Award Player of the Week for his efforts against Kansas State. He continued to serve as Texas' starting quarterback for his first Red River Rivalry game against the 12th-ranked Oklahoma Sooners on October 14. In the rivalry matchup, the Longhorns trailed the Sooners 0–20 in the second quarter before amassing a 24–23 lead in the fourth quarter following an 8-yard rushing touchdown by Ehlinger; however, Texas was unable to secure the lead, and a final attempt to score ended when Ehlinger threw the ball out of bounds on fourth-and-13, resulting in a 29–24 loss. Ehlinger finished the game having passed for 278 yards and rushed for 106 yards, making him the first freshman quarterback in school history to rush for over 100 yards in back-to-back games. During the fourth quarter of the game, Ehlinger briefly laid motionless following a hard tackle, sitting out a subsequent play to undergo concussion protocol before later returning to the field. Although Ehlinger stated in the post-game press conference that he "felt fine" and "wasn't ever confused where [he] was at all," Boston University CTE Center co-founder Christopher Nowinski expressed skepticism on Twitter that concussion protocol was properly followed. Ehlinger maintained the starting quarterback role in a 13–10 overtime loss to a top-10 Oklahoma State Cowboys team, completing 22 of 36 passes for 241 yards but throwing a game-ending interception in the endzone during overtime to solidify the loss. Following the game, he showed concussion symptoms that would place him in concussion protocol, with a healing Buechele slotted into the starting quarterback role; Ehlinger did not travel with the team for their 38–7 away victory the following week over the Baylor Bears.

Ehlinger was available to play against the TCU Horned Frogs, with coach Herman indicating that "[Shane Buechele, Sam Ehlinger, and Jerrod Heard] are probably going to play at one point or another." However, an inner ear issue sidelined Ehlinger for the game. He was cleared to play against the Kansas Jayhawks the following week, serving as a backup quarterback and completing two passes and scoring one touchdown in the fourth quarter in the Longhorns' victory. He did not start at quarterback against the 24th-ranked West Virginia Mountaineers but assumed the role after two offensive series, throwing for two touchdowns as well as recording a 23-yard catch from Jerrod Heard in the 28–14 win. However, one throw was also intercepted 94 yards for a touchdown. With both Ehlinger and Buechele healthy and having started games for Texas, Herman publicly announced early that Ehlinger would start for the Longhorns against the Texas Tech Red Raiders, an unusual departure of protocol from previous games. Although he played well for much of the game in maintaining a lead for the Longhorns, Ehlinger threw an interception that was returned 55 yards in the closing minutes of the fourth quarter, eventually setting up a go-ahead touchdown from Texas Tech. Ehlinger threw a second interception on Texas' final offensive opportunity to reclaim the lead, resulting in a 27–23 loss to end the regular season.

Although Ehlinger received the starting nod against Texas Tech over a healthy Buechele, their performances were not sufficiently separable to declare a longer-term starting quarterback, resulting in the two evenly splitting practices in the lead-up to the 2017 Texas Bowl against the Missouri Tigers. Buechele would eventually be prioritized for the bowl game, with Herman and Beck citing concerns over Ehlinger's protection of the football as a deciding factor. During the Texas Bowl, Ehlinger saw play as quarterback for part of the first half and much of the second half due to Buechele suffering a groin injury, leading the Longhorns to a 33–16 victory completing 11 of 15 passes for 112 yards and a touchdown. With the win, Ehlinger finished the season with a 2–4 record as a starter with playing time in nine total games; he was also the team's leading passer and rusher by yardage.

=== 2018 season ===
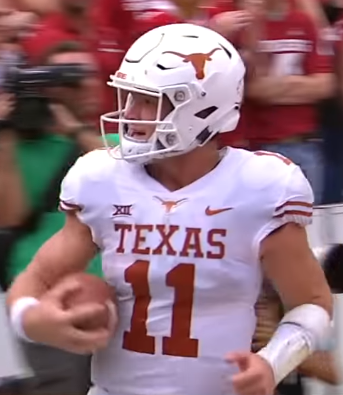
Ehlinger playing for Texas in 2018

At the start of spring practice in 2018, the starting quarterback role for the Texas Longhorns remained unclear. Both Ehlinger and Buechele remained the primary candidates for the position, alongside newly recruited quarterbacks Cameron Rising and Casey Thompson. During the spring game, Ehlinger served as quarterback for the White team, throwing for 151 yards and a touchdown and leading both squads with 29 rushing yards on four carries. Despite not being officially named as the starting quarterback, Ehlinger appeared to edge out the other quarterbacks following spring practice, having improved substantially in the speed of his throws. In May, Athlon Sports named him as the fourth best quarterback in the Big 12 Conference. On August 20, coach Herman announced that Ehlinger would be the starting quarterback for the season opener against the Maryland Terrapins, lauding his improvements in throwing the football and his pocket presence. The Longhorns would lose to the Terrapins for the second straight year in a 29–34 loss on September 1. Ehlinger completed 21 of 39 passes for 263 yards and 2 touchdowns but threw two costly interceptions late in the fourth quarter, ensuring a Terrapins victory. Coach Herman expressed continued confidence in Ehlinger in the starting role despite the disappointing performance to close out the loss to Maryland, iterating that he did not doubt the quarterback's skills. Against the Tulsa Golden Hurricane the following week, Ehlinger threw for 237 yards and 2 touchdowns with an additional rushing touchdown, helping to stave off a resurgent performance from the Golden Hurricane to win 28–21. He led the Longhorns to a 37–14 win over the #24 USC Trojans to close out out-of-conference play, throwing for 223 yards and 2 touchdowns in addition to rushing for 35 yards and a touchdown.

Ehlinger put up similar numbers against the 17th-ranked TCU Horned Frogs to open conference play on September 22 as he did against USC, going 22–32 for 255 yards and 2 touchdowns in the air with an additional rushing touchdown to propel the Longhorns to a 31–16 victory. His passing numbers moved him past his high school coach Todd Dodge in terms of career passing yardage for the Texas Longhorns, and Ehlinger became the first Longhorns quarterback since Colt McCoy's 2008 season to post three consecutive games with at least two passing touchdowns and one rushing touchdown. Ehlinger also became the first quarterback in school history to start a season with at least four consecutive games with over 200 yards passing and multiple touchdowns per game. His performance against TCU was also recognized in the Davey O'Brien Award's "Great 8" for the week. On October 7, Ehlinger completed a career-high 80.6 percent of his passes on a 207-yard passing effort and one touchdown, as well as making two receptions for 24 receiving yards in a 19–14 win at Kansas State.

On October 6, Ehlinger led the Longhorns to a 48–45 upset victory against the #7 Oklahoma Sooners and accounted for 386 total yards and five touchdowns. Of those five touchdowns, three were rushing touchdowns—both statistics were career highs for Ehlinger and the five total touchdowns were the most by a Texas quarterback in the history of the Red River Rivalry. He also broke the school record set by Major Applewhite for consecutive passes without an interception. Ehlinger's efficient performance in the pivotal rivalry game attracted widespread praise. Following the game, FOX analyst and former quarterback Matt Leinart stated that Ehlinger "became [a legend] today." Ehlinger was named the Big 12 Offensive Player of the Week, the Walter Camp Award Offensive Player of the Week, the Earl Campbell Tyler Rose Award National Player of the Week, the Maxwell Award Player of the Week, and was listed on the Davey O'Brien Award's "Great 8" for the second time in 2018. The next week against the Baylor Bears, he was injured on the first drive of the game after he suffered a separated shoulder after throwing for five times and rushing twice. An MRI scan would later confirm the injury as a grade I AC sprain. A break in play afforded by a bye gave Ehlinger more time to recover, allowing him to start at quarterback against Oklahoma State on October 27. In Stillwater, Oklahoma, Ehlinger scored four total touchdowns and threw for 283 yards, narrowing a 17-point halftime deficit that ended in a 38–35 loss. A second consecutive loss followed the next week against West Virginia, though Ehlinger recorded an efficient performance with 354 yards through the air—a season high—and three passing touchdowns in addition to a rushing touchdown in the 42–41 loss.

The Longhorns ended the two-game losing skid with a 41–34 win against rivals Texas Tech on November 10 with Ehlinger throwing for a career-high 4 touchdowns with 312 passing yards, including a 29-yard go-ahead touchdown pass to Lil'Jordan Humphrey with 21 seconds remaining. By the end of the game, Ehlinger had attempted 280 passes without an interception, breaking former West Virginia quarterback Geno Smith's Big 12 record streak of 273 passes set in 2012. For his performance, Ehlinger was named as one of eight Manning Award Stars of the Week, while his overall performance in the season named him a semifinalist for the Earl Campbell Tyler Rose Award. He completed 12 passes for 137 yards with a passing touchdown and rushing touchdown in the first half of the game against the Iowa State Cyclones before a tackle late in the second quarter aggravated the AC sprain suffered against Baylor, sidelining him for the rest of the game. However, he was cleared shortly after to play in the final regular season game against the Kansas Jayhawks where he threw for two touchdowns and ran for another in a 24–17 victory. Ehlinger threw two interceptions during the game, ending his streak of pass attempts without an interception at 308. Despite being cleared for injury, Ehlinger noted that the shoulder injury "was bothering him" in the game against Kansas, though coach Herman predicted that Ehlinger would recover in time for the 2018 Big 12 Championship Game.

In the conference title game against the Oklahoma Sooners on December 1, Ehlinger threw for 349 yards, passed for two touchdowns, and rushed for two touchdowns in a 39–27 loss. In the post-game press conference, Ehlinger asserted that he "would make it my mission to never let [the Longhorns] or [the University of Texas] feel this disappointment again," a sentiment that drew comparisons to a famous speech given by Tim Tebow following a loss to Ole Miss in 2008. Ahead of the 2019 Sugar Bowl matchup against the fifth-ranked Georgia Bulldogs at the New Orleans Saints' Superdome, Ehlinger wore Saints quarterback Drew Brees's high school jersey when arriving to the stadium, having attended the same high school. Ehlinger would lead the Longhorns to a 28–21 victory over the Bulldogs at the Sugar Bowl on January 1, 2019, despite entering the game as 13.5-point underdogs. He threw for 169 yards but was most impactful in the rushing game, where he ran 21 times for 64 yards and 3 touchdowns; for his performance, he was named the game's MVP. The three rushing touchdowns tied the Sugar Bowl record for rushing touchdowns by a quarterback, while the 16 total rushing touchdowns accumulated by Ehlinger over the season broke the school record for rushing touchdowns by a quarterback in a single season set by Donnie Wigginton in 1971 and Vince Young in 2004. Ehlinger's seasonal touchdown effort also made him the sixth Power Five quarterback in the previous two decades to throw for over 25 touchdowns and run for more than 15 in a single season, joining five Heisman Trophy winners. He was named an All Big 12 Team Honorable Mention.

=== 2019 season ===
On the heels of a strong sophomore campaign, Ehlinger was named one of the early favorites to win the 2019 Heisman Trophy in December 2018 and was a preseason candidate for the Walter Camp Player of the Year and Manning Award. The Dallas Morning News considered him the best quarterback in the Big 12 Conference entering the season and he made numerous Preseason All-Big 12 and All-American lists.

Ehlinger was the starter for all 13 games in what was a somewhat disappointing season. Despite high hopes for the team – the Longhorns started out ranked #10 and were expected to compete for the Big 12 Title – the Longhorns went 8–5, did not make it to the Big 12 Title game and found themselves in the Alamo Bowl. Ehlinger, however, did not have a bad season. He had his first game with 400+ passing yards and had a record breaking start, setting school records for passing yards (2,378) passing touchdowns (23) and total offense (2,738) through the first eight games, and set similar records for three, four and five game starts. He also became the only player in Texas history to throw for at least 200 yards and two touchdowns in the first five games of a season, set the school record for four passing touchdown games in a season (4) and 3 touchdown games (6). He tied Colt McCoy for the school record with his twelfth 200-yard passing game this season and became the only quarterback in UT history to throw for 200 yards in 12 straight games during a single season. He became a semifinalist for the Maxwell Award, Davey O'Brien Award, Wuerffel Trophy and Earl Campbell Tyler Rose Award and finished the season with a win in the Alamo Bowl and being named the game's Offensive MVP. It was the team's, and Ehlinger's, third straight bowl win. He was again named an All Big 12 Team Honorable Mention.

=== 2020 season ===
Ehlinger came into his senior season with high expectations. He was a preseason All-American and preseason All-Big 12 quarterback named to the watch lists for the Davey O'Brien Award, Earl Campbell Tyler Rose Award, Johnny Unitas Golden Arm Award, Manning Award, Maxwell Award, William V. Campbell Trophy and Wuerffel Trophy. The Longhorns started the season ranked 14th and were expected to finish third in the Big 12 behind the Oklahoma Sooners and the Oklahoma State Cowboys. But the COVID-shortened season was another disappointment, if only a small one, as the Longhorns finished fourth in Conference and ranked 19th. Ehlinger was named second team Big 12 and left off the major award circuit.

Ehlinger started all nine games for the Longhorns and the team went 7–3 and won the Alamo Bowl. They lost a quadruple overtime game to Oklahoma following an interception by Ehlinger in the last OT and came back to beat #6 Oklahoma State in overtime on the road.

Though he did not meet his preseason expectations, Ehlinger had a good season. He finished ranked first or second among Big 12 quarterbacks in passing efficiency (150.7), passing touchdowns (26), passing yards per completion (13.23), points responsible for (208), points responsible for per game (20.8) and total offense (294.3). He was named the Player of the Week by the Walter Camp Football Foundation, Big 12 Conference and Earl Campbell Tyler Rose Award and was a Davey O'Brien Award's "Great 8" and a Manning Award Star of the Week following the UTEP game. He was Big 12 Player of the Week again against LSU. He set school records for most games with at least one rushing and one passing touchdown (15), most game winning drives (7) and tied the school quarterback record of four rushing touchdowns in a game and tied the records for most games with 350+ yards of total offense (11) and 400+ yards of total offense (5).

His accolades at the end of the season included winning the Jason Witten Collegiate Man of the Year award, being named a finalist for the William V. Campbell Trophy, Wuerffel Trophy and Bobby Bowden Trophy, being selected to the Allstate AFCA Good Works Team and was named the Co-Big 12 Football Scholar-Athlete of the Year. He was a semifinalist for the Davey O'Brien Award and Earl Campbell Tyler Rose Award and also a Johnny Unitas Golden Arm Award Top-10 Candidate. He was named to the All-Big 12 Second Team.

He finished his career as second in school history in career passing yards, attempts, completions, total touchdowns, total offense and touchdown passes behind Colt McCoy, second in rushing touchdowns for a quarterback behind Vince Young and third in rushing yards for a quarterback.

He finished his career ranked fourth in Big 12 history in total touchdowns, sixth in total offense and interception percentage, seventh in passing touchdowns, eighth in total yards and attempts, ninth in passing yards and completions.

=== Records ===
- University of Texas – Most rushing touchdowns by a quarterback, season (16, 2018)
- University of Texas – Fewest games to reach 2000 yards passing, season (7, 1999) tied with Colt McCoy
- University of Texas – Fewest games to reach 1000 yards passing, season (4, 2017, 2019 and 2020) tied with seven others
- University of Texas – Lowest interception rate, career (minimum 300 attempts) (1.83%)
- University of Texas – Most consecutive pass attempts without an interception (308, 2018)
- University of Texas – Most 400 yard passing games, season (1, 2019 and 2020) tied with 3 others
- University of Texas – Most 400 yard passing games, career (2) tied with 2 others
- University of Texas – Most 200 yard passing games, season (13, 2019)
- University of Texas – Most consecutive 200 yard passing games (as a starter), season (13, 2019)
- University of Texas – Most passing yards ever against Kansas, TCU, Kansas State and West Virginia
- University of Texas – Most passing yards by a true freshman, game (380, Kansas State, 2017)
- University of Texas – Most rushing touchdowns by a quarterback, game (4, Oklahoma, 2020) tied with 4 others
- Big 12 – Most consecutive pass attempts without an interception, season and career (308, 2018)

=== Statistics ===
Season	Team	Games			Passing								Rushing			
Season	Team	GP	GS	Record	Cmp	Att	Pct	Yds	Y/A	TD	Int	Rtg	Att	Yds	Avg	TD
2017	Texas	9	6	2–4	158	275	57.5	1,915	7.0	11	7	124.1	114	381	3.3	2
2018	Texas	14	14	10–4	275	425	64.7	3,292	7.7	25	5	146.8	164	482	2.9	16
2019	Texas	13	13	8–5	296	454	65.2	3,663	8.1	32	10	151.8	163	663	4.1	7
2020	Texas	10	10	7–3	194	322	60.2	2,566	8.0	26	5	150.7	113	377	3.3	8
Career		46	43	27–16	923	1,476	62.5	11,436	7.7	94	27	145.0	554	1,907	3.4	33

== Professional career ==
Pre-draft measurables
Height	Weight	Arm length	Hand span	Wingspan	40-yard dash	10-yard split	20-yard split	20-yard shuttle	Three-cone drill	Vertical jump	Broad jump
6 ft 1 1/8 in (1.86 m)	220 lb (100 kg)	30 3/8 in (0.77 m)	9 5/8 in (0.24 m)	6 ft 2 1/4 in (1.89 m)	4.84 s	1.71 s	2.68 s	4.44 s	7.15 s	36.5 in (0.93 m)	9 ft 6 in (2.90 m)
All values from Pro Day

Ehlinger in a 2022 preseason game against the Buffalo Bills

=== Indianapolis Colts ===
Ehlinger was selected by the Indianapolis Colts in the sixth round, 218th overall, of the 2021 NFL draft. On May 19, 2021, he signed his four-year rookie contract with the Colts. Ehlinger came into his rookie season competing for the backup position against Jacob Eason. In his first preseason game, he led the Colts to a 21–18 comeback win over the Carolina Panthers. He was placed on injured reserve on September 2 to start the season, after suffering an ACL sprain, before being activated on October 19.

On October 15, 2022, Ehlinger was promoted to the backup quarterback role, with incumbent Nick Foles sliding down to third–string. On October 24, Ehlinger was named the Colts starting quarterback for the remainder of the 2022 season, replacing Matt Ryan. In his first start in Week 8 against the Washington Commanders, Ehlinger completed 17 of 23 pass attempts for 201 yards, but also lost a fumble in the red zone in a 17–16 home loss. The following week, after a 26–3 loss to the New England Patriots, where Ehlinger threw for just 103 yards and an interception, head coach Frank Reich was fired, and interim Jeff Saturday announced that Ryan would return to the starting role against the Las Vegas Raiders.

On January 2, 2023, Ehlinger was announced as the Colts' starting quarterback for Week 18, with Ryan set to serve as the backup for the contest.

=== Denver Broncos ===
On March 31, 2025, Ehlinger signed a one-year contract with the Denver Broncos. On August 26, Ehlinger was released by the Broncos. The next day, he was re-signed to the practice squad despite having offers from multiple other teams to sign to their 53-man active rosters. On September 6, Ehlinger was promoted to the active roster following an injury to Malcolm Roach. He was released on October 17 and re-signed to the practice squad the next day. On October 22, Ehlinger was promoted to the active roster once again. On October 28, Ehlinger was again released and re-signed to the practice squad the next day. He was promoted back to the active roster on January 5, 2026. Ehlinger did not play in any regular season games for the Broncos in 2025, but was active for the AFC Championship to back up Jarrett Stidham following Bo Nix's season-ending ankle injury.

On March 8, 2026, Ehlinger signed a one-year, $2 million contract extension with the Broncos.

== NFL career statistics ==
Year	Team	Games			Passing									Rushing					Sacks		Fumbles	
Year	Team	GP	GS	Record	Cmp	Att	Pct	Yds	Y/A	Lng	TD	Int	Rtg	Att	Yds	Avg	Lng	TD	Sck	SckY	Fum	Lost
2021	IND	3	0	—	0	0	0.0	0	0.0	0	0	0	0.0	3	9	3.0	9	0	0	0	0	0
2022	IND	4	3	0−3	64	101	63.4	573	5.7	47	3	3	76.1	17	87	5.1	19	0	14	87	2	1
2023	IND	1	0	—	0	0	0.0	0	0.0	0	0	0	0.0	0	0	0.0	0	0	0	0	0	0
2024	IND	0	0	—	DNP																	
2025	DEN	0	0	—	DNP																	
Career		8	3	0−3	64	101	63.4	573	5.7	47	3	3	76.1	20	96	4.8	19	0	14	87	2	1

== Personal life ==
Ehlinger is a Christian. He is married to Cami Jo Ehlinger. The couple announced they were pregnant with their first child on April 12, 2026.

Ehlinger's father, Ross, died from a heart attack in 2013 during a triathlon at age 46, and his younger brother Jake, who played linebacker for the Texas Longhorns, died from an accidental overdose of Xanax and fentanyl at the age of 20 on May 6, 2021.
