= Roosevelt Leaks =

American football player (born 1953)

- Leaks in 1977

No. 46, 48
- Position: Running back

Personal information
- Born: January 31, 1953 (age 73); Brenham, Texas, U.S.
- Listed height: 5 ft 10 in (1.78 m)
- Listed weight: 255 lb (116 kg)

Career information
- High school: Brenham
- College: Texas
- NFL draft: 1975: 5th round, 105th overall pick

Career history
- Baltimore Colts (1975–1979); Buffalo Bills (1980–1983)

Awards and highlights
- Consensus All-American (1973); Second-team All-American (1972); SWC Offensive Player of the Year (1973); 2× First-team All-SWC (1972, 1973)

Career NFL statistics
- Games played: 107
- Starts: 58
- Carries: 663
- Rushing yards: 2,406
- Rushing touchdowns: 28
- Receptions: 71
- Receiving yards: 590
- Receiving touchdowns: 4
- Stats at Pro Football Reference
- College Football Hall of Fame

Roosevelt Leaks Jr. (born January 31, 1953) is an American former professional football player who was a running back in the National Football League (NFL). He played college football for the Texas Longhorns. A consensus All-American in 1973, he was inducted into the College Football Hall of Fame in 2005. Leaks was the first black All-American player in University of Texas at Austin history and went on to play in the NFL for the Baltimore Colts and Buffalo Bills.

== Early life ==
Born and raised in Brenham, Texas, between Houston and Austin, Leaks grew up on his family's farm, where they raised, among other things, cotton and corn. His father was a farmer and day laborer. Leaks was an all-state running back and linebacker for Brenham High School in 1969 and 1970, scoring a total of 56 touchdowns during his high school career. He was also the clean-up-hitting outfielder for the school's baseball team, helping Brenham win its first Class AAA state championship in that sport in 1970.

Heavily recruited, he had his mind set on the University of Houston, until he realized that the Cougars had three other running backs in his recruiting class. Instead, he signed with his second choice, the University of Texas in Austin.

== College career ==
Leaks arrived at UT in 1971, only one year after the Longhorns football team had their first black letterman. Freshmen weren't eligible to play on the varsity until the following year, but he soon emerged as one of the country's top running backs.

In 1972, he was the team's leading rusher, running for 1,099 yards and eight touchdowns, making him only the second Longhorn to rush for a thousand yards in a season. He earned All-Southwest Conference honors as a running back and helped Texas to a 10–1 regular season record and a #7 ranking, then a win over #4 Alabama in the Cotton Bowl. In that game, he rushed for 120 yards, which, at the time, was the third-best performance by a Texas running back in the Cotton Bowl. Quarterback Alan Lowry ran for 117 yards, making it the first time Texas had two 100-yard rushers in the same bowl game. Down 13–3 at the half the Longhorns shut out the Tide in the second half and finished third in the final AP poll.

As well as Leaks did in 1972, he was even better in 1973 as a junior. He was again the team's leading rusher and set a school and Southwest Conference rushing records with 1,415 yards. He also set or tied 7 other school records that season, including the conference record for most yards in a game when he ran for 342 yards in a 42–14 win over SMU. This was only eight yards short of Eric Allen's NCAA record of 350 yards, set two years earlier in 1971. Leaks was again named All-SWC, as well as a consensus All-American. He finished third in the Heisman balloting, which made him only the fifth Longhorn Heisman finalist and tied him with James Saxton's 1961 performance for the best Longhorn Heisman finish. Texas went 8–3 in 1973 and won another Southwest Conference title and were ranked eighth, but lost the Cotton Bowl 19–3 to #12 Nebraska and finished fourteenth.

Following his success, Leaks was an early Heisman favorite for the 1974 season, but suffered a serious injury in spring drills when he leaped into the air and another player's helmet hit his knee. It required surgery and Leaks was given the option to take a redshirt season. He chose to play, but missed the first game and was hobbled by injuries all season. Freshman Earl Campbell was given the majority of carries and was the team's leading rusher and bowl MVP that year. Leaks carried the ball 96 times for 409 yards and 4 touchdowns. Texas was 8–3 in the regular season but were runner-up to Baylor in the Southwest Conference. The #11 Longhorns lost 27–3 to #6 Auburn in the Gator Bowl, in which Leaks did not play, and fell to seventeenth in the final poll.

=== Records ===
- UT Record - Most rushing yards, game (342), surpassed by Ricky Williams in 1998
- UT Record - Most rushing yards by a junior, game (342)
- UT Record - Most rushing yards, road game (342)
- UT Record - Most rushing yards, season (1,415), surpassed by Earl Campbell in 1977
- UT Record - Most touchdowns, season (14), tied Byron Townsend, Steve Worster and Donnie Wigginton, surpassed by Campbell in 1977
- UT Record - Most 100-yard games, season (7), tied Chris Gilbert, surpassed by Campbell in 1977
- UT Record - Most 200-yard games, season (2), tied Gilbert, tied by Campbell in 1977, surpassed by Ricky Williams in 1997
- UT Record - Most 300-yard total offense games, season (1), tied Eddie Phillips, surpassed by Donnie Little in 1980
- UT Record - Most 300-yard total offense games, career (1), tied Eddie Phillips, surpassed by Donnie Little in 1980
- UT Record - Highest Heisman voting finish (3rd), tied James Saxton, surpassed by Campbell in 1977
- SWC Record - Most rushing yards, game (342), surpassed by Tony Jeffery of TCU in 1987
- SWC Record - Most rushing yards, season (1,415), surpassed by Campbell in 1977

=== Candidate for Heisman ===
1973 Heisman Trophy Finalist Voting
| Finalist | First place votes (3 pts. each) | Second place votes (2 pts. each) | Third place votes (1 pt. each) | Total points |
|---|---|---|---|---|
| John Cappelletti | 229 | 142 | 86 | 1,057 |
| John Hicks | 114 | 64 | 54 | 524 |
| Roosevelt Leaks | 74 | 80 | 100 | 482 |
| David Jaynes | 65 | 68 | 63 | 394 |
| Archie Griffin | 45 | 63 | 65 | 326 |
| Randy Gradishar | 47 | 53 | 35 | 282 |

== NFL career ==
Leaks was selected in the fifth round of the 1975 NFL draft by the Baltimore Colts. He played five years for the Colts, putting up 1,268 yards and 14 touchdowns, but he spent most of his fifth season on the sidelines after the Colts added former first-round choice Don Hardeman. After the 1979 season, he was waived by Baltimore and picked up by the Buffalo Bills, where he spent four years carrying the ball and blocking for Joe Cribbs. He was considered one of the best blocking backs in the NFL, with his teams making it to the playoffs in 5 out of his 9 seasons.

At training camp of his tenth year he was cut by the Bills in August 1984. At that time, only one running back from his class, Walter Payton, was still playing.

== NFL career statistics ==
Legend
| **Bold** | Career high |

=== Regular season ===
| Year | Team | Games | | Rushing | | | | | Receiving | | | | |
| Year | Team | GP | GS | Att | Yds | Avg | Lng | TD | Rec | Yds | Avg | Lng | TD |
|---|---|---|---|---|---|---|---|---|---|---|---|---|---|
| 1975 | BAL | 11 | 0 | 41 | 175 | **4.3** | 17 | 1 | 1 | 5 | 5.0 | 5 | 0 |
| 1976 | BAL | 13 | **13** | **118** | **445** | 3.8 | **42** | **7** | 8 | 43 | 5.4 | 10 | 0 |
| 1977 | BAL | 11 | 10 | 59 | 237 | 4.0 | 39 | 3 | 3 | 39 | **13.0** | 26 | 1 |
| 1978 | BAL | 12 | 12 | 83 | 266 | 3.2 | 11 | 2 | 9 | 111 | 12.3 | **27** | **2** |
| 1979 | BAL | 7 | 5 | 49 | 145 | 3.0 | 17 | 1 | **14** | **119** | 8.5 | 15 | 0 |
| 1980 | BUF | **16** | 0 | 67 | 219 | 3.3 | 15 | 2 | 8 | 57 | 7.1 | 18 | 1 |
| 1981 | BUF | **16** | 5 | 91 | 357 | 3.9 | 31 | 6 | 7 | 51 | 7.3 | 13 | 0 |
| 1982 | BUF | 9 | 9 | 97 | 405 | 4.2 | 17 | 5 | 13 | 91 | 7.0 | 11 | 0 |
| 1983 | BUF | 12 | 4 | 58 | 157 | 2.7 | 12 | 1 | 8 | 74 | 9.3 | 12 | 0 |
| | | 107 | 58 | 663 | 2,406 | 3.6 | 42 | 28 | 71 | 590 | 8.3 | 27 | 4 |

=== Playoffs ===
| Year | Team | Games | | Rushing | | | | | Receiving | | | | |
| Year | Team | GP | GS | Att | Yds | Avg | Lng | TD | Rec | Yds | Avg | Lng | TD |
|---|---|---|---|---|---|---|---|---|---|---|---|---|---|
| 1976 | BAL | 1 | 1 | 4 | 12 | 3.0 | 6 | **1** | 0 | 0 | 0.0 | 0 | 0 |
| 1977 | BAL | 1 | 1 | 8 | **35** | **4.4** | **11** | 0 | 0 | 0 | 0.0 | 0 | 0 |
| 1980 | BUF | 1 | 0 | 4 | 6 | 1.5 | 2 | **1** | 1 | 17 | **17.0** | **17** | 0 |
| 1981 | BUF | **2** | **2** | **9** | 24 | 2.7 | 6 | 0 | **5** | **39** | 7.8 | 11 | 0 |
| | | 5 | 4 | 25 | 77 | 3.1 | 11 | 2 | 6 | 56 | 9.3 | 17 | 0 |

== Personal life ==
Leaks and his wife had been working in the real estate business for several years before his football career ended and he transitioned into it full-time. In 1987, he began working with Texas General Land Office in Austin, eventually becoming the Director of Veterans Land Board Appraisals. He retired from that job in 2013.
