= Freeman Johns =

American football player (born 1953)

No. 88
- Position: Wide receiver

Personal information
- Born: December 20, 1953 (age 72); Waco, Texas, U.S.
- Listed height: 6 ft 1 in (1.85 m)
- Listed weight: 175 lb (79 kg)

Career information
- High school: Wichita Falls (TX) S. H. Rider
- College: SMU
- NFL draft: 1976: 10th round, 288th overall pick

Career history
- Los Angeles Rams (1976–1977); Saskatchewan Roughriders (1978–1979)
- Stats at Pro Football Reference

Freeman Johns (born December 20, 1953) is an American former professional football player who was a wide receiver for the Los Angeles Rams of the National Football League (NFL) from 1976 to 1977. He played college football for the SMU Mustangs. He also played pro ball in the Canadian Football League (CFL) for the Saskatchewan Roughriders from 1978 to 1979.
