= Ray Jamieson =

Australian rules footballer

Personal information
- Full name: Ray Jamieson
- Born: 1 August 1959 (age 67)
- Original team: Noble Park
- Height: 191 cm (6 ft 3 in)
- Weight: 84 kg (185 lb)

Playing career^{1}
Years	Club	Games (Goals)
1977–78	South Melbourne	5 (5)
- ^{1} Playing statistics correct to the end of 1978.

Ray Jamieson (born 1 August 1959) is a former Australian rules footballer who played with South Melbourne in the Victorian Football League (VFL).
