= 1974 Cotton Bowl Classic =

- 38th Cotton Bowl Classic
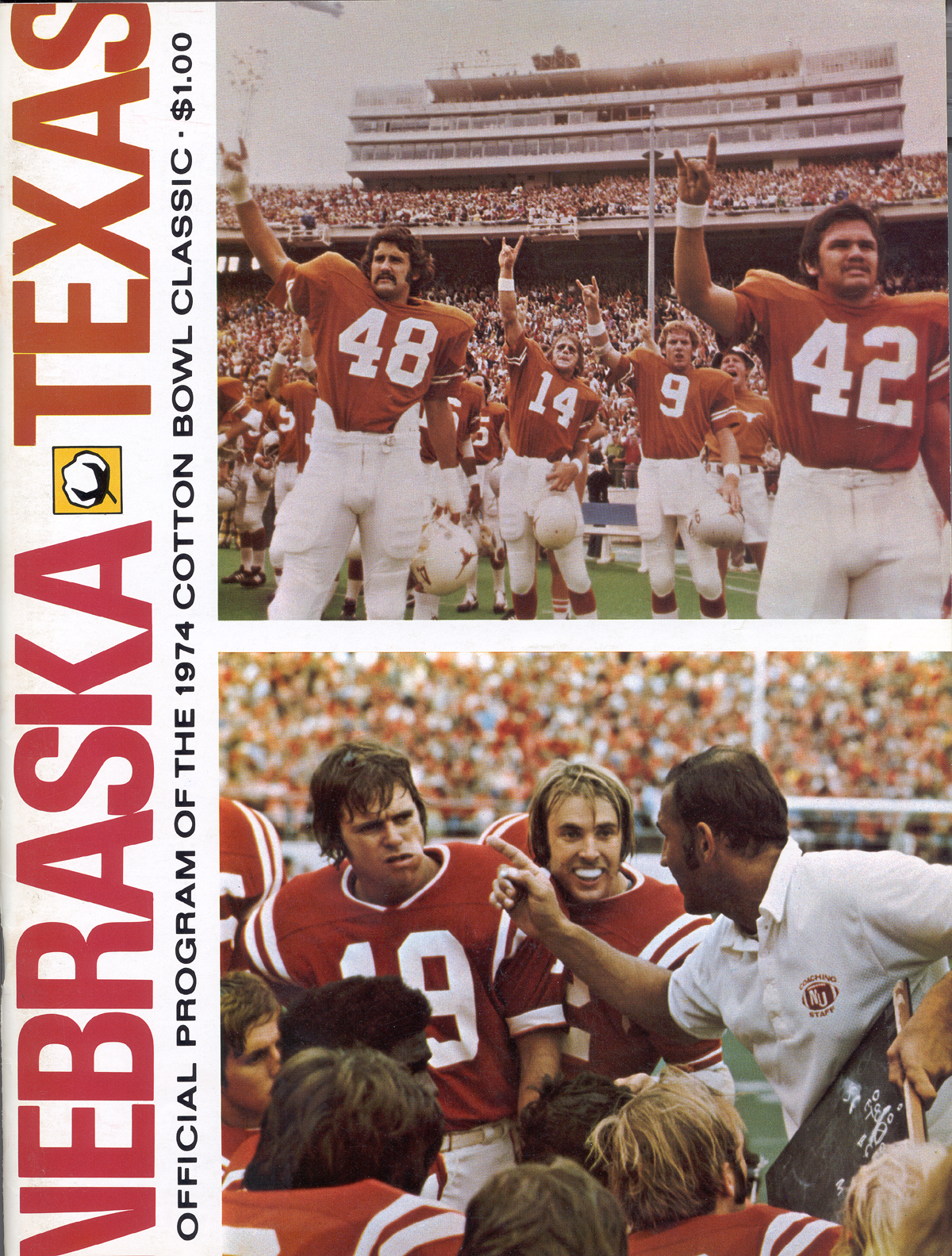
Nebraska Cornhuskers	Texas Longhorns
(8–2–1)	(8–2)
Big 8	SWC
19	3
Head coach: Tom Osborne	Head coach: Darrell Royal
AP / Coaches; 12 / 11	AP / Coaches; 8 / 8
	1	2	3	4	Total
Nebraska	0	3	13	3	19
Texas	3	0	0	0	3
- Date: January 1, 1974
- Season: 1973
- Stadium: Cotton Bowl
- Location: Dallas, Texas
- MVP: TB Tony Davis (Nebraska); LB Wade Johnston (Texas)
- Favorite: Texas by 4 points
- Referee: Curly Hays (SWC; split crew: SWC, Big Eight)
- Attendance: 68,500

United States TV coverage
- Network: CBS
- Announcers: Lindsey Nelson, Tom Brookshier, and Frank Glieber

The Cotton Bowl in Dallas, Texas, hosted the Cotton Bowl Classic.

The 1974 Cotton Bowl Classic was played on January 1 at the Cotton Bowl in Dallas. It matched the Texas Longhorns of the Southwest Conference and the Nebraska Cornhuskers of the Big Eight Conference.

== Teams ==
=== Nebraska ===
The Cornhuskers were runners-up to Oklahoma in the Big Eight for a second straight year; Tom Osborne was in his first year as head coach (after four years as the offensive coordinator under Bob Devaney). Their only previous Cotton Bowl appearance was in January 1965, and they had won the previous three Orange Bowls. The offense was led by junior southpaw quarterback David Humm, with Tony Davis at I-back. The defensive line was anchored by John Dutton, the fifth pick in the 1974 NFL draft

=== Texas ===
The Longhorns were Southwest Conference champions for the sixth straight year, and played in their sixth consecutive Cotton Bowl Classic. Led by head coach Darrell Royal, Texas was favored by four points.

== Game summary ==
The temperature in Dallas for the 12 noon CST kickoff was around 30 °F (−1 °C). Texas scored first on a 22-yard field goal by Billy Schott. With nine minutes later in the half came a hit that led to three points. Longhorn fullback Roosevelt Leaks was hit hard while Texas was driving at the 29, and the ball shot up into the air. Husker defensive end Steve Manstedt saw the ball pop into the air, grabbed the ball, and returned it 65 yards to the Texas 6. Though they could not find the end zone, Nebraska scored with a 24-yard field goal by Rich Sanger, and the teams went to halftime tied at three each.

At halftime, Osborne replaced David Humm with senior reserve Steve Runty, a better rushing quarterback. The second half was dominated by Nebraska, with 16 points added and none allowed. Ritch Bahe scored on a 12-yard run late in the quarter to make it 10–3. With 1:23 left in the quarter, Tony Davis scored from three yards out to increase the lead to 16–3. Texas could not respond, as they turned the ball over five times and gained less than 200 yards. Sanger added a field goal midway through the fourth quarter to complete the scoring at 19–3. This remains the Huskers' only Cotton Bowl Classic win.

Over two thousand tickets went unsold, the first time in twelve years that the game did not sell out.

=== Scoring ===
First quarter

- Texas – Field goal, Billy Schott 22

Second quarter

- Nebraska – Field goal, Rich Sanger 24

Third quarter

- Nebraska – Ritch Bahe 12 run (Sanger kick)
- Nebraska – Tony Davis 3 run (kick failed)

Fourth quarter

- Nebraska – Field goal, Sanger 43

=== Statistics ===
Statistics	Nebraska	Texas
First downs	21	11
Rushes–yards	58–240	37–106
Passing yards	91	90
Passes	7–17–2	7–17–2
Total yards	331	196
Punts–average	3–40.0	4–39.8
Fumbles–lost	3–1	6–3
Turnovers by	3	5
Penalties–yards	4–51	2–30

== Aftermath ==
In the final AP poll in January, Nebraska improved to seventh and Texas fell to fourteenth. This was the last season that the final UPI coaches poll was released before the bowls.

This was the last Cotton Bowl appearance for Texas under Royal; he retired after the 1976 season, but his successor Fred Akers led them back in his first season in January 1978. The Huskers returned in 1980 and 2007, but lost both.
