= Alan Pringle =

Venezuelan gridiron football player (born 1952)

No. 15
- Position: Placekicker

Personal information
- Born: January 20, 1952 (age 74); Los Taques, Venezuela
- Listed height: 6 ft 0 in (1.83 m)
- Listed weight: 195 lb (88 kg)

Career information
- High school: Rugby (UK)
- College: Rice (1970–1971, 1973–1974)
- NFL draft: 1975: 10th round, 246th overall pick

Career history
- Houston Oilers (1975)*; Detroit Lions (1975); New England Patriots (1976)*
- * Offseason or practice squad member only

Career NFL statistics
- Games played: 1
- Stats at Pro Football Reference

Alan Keith Pringle (born January 20, 1952) is a Venezuelan-born former American football placekicker who played one game in the National Football League (NFL) for the Detroit Lions. Born in Venezuela, he played college football for the Rice Owls and was also a member of the Houston Oilers and New England Patriots.

== Early and personal life ==
Pringle was born on January 20, 1952, in Los Taques, Venezuela, and spent his early years in Caracas. His parents were from England. He later moved to England, where he attended Rugby High School. He grew up playing soccer and rugby. Pringle is, along with fellow placekicker Pat Ragusa, José Borregales, and Andy Borregales, one of only four Venezuelan-born National Football League (NFL) players. Pringle married Ann Dillard in 1974.

== College career ==
Pringle later moved to the United States to attend Rice University. As a freshman at Rice in 1970, he was noticed by an assistant coach for the Rice Owls football team, who saw him kicking a soccer ball at a P.E. class. He was invited to tryout for the team and "was shown a football and told to kick it through the uprights." He recalled "That was on a Tuesday. On Thursday I kicked for some more coaches and on Friday I was playing against Wharton Junior College in a JV game."

Pringle's first appearance was the first American football game he had ever seen. "They told me when someone yelled 'touchdown' I was supposed to go in and kick," he said. He showed inexperience in his first game, however, mistiming his kickoffs and wearing backwards hip pads. He later improved and set a school record for the freshman team that year with a 48-yard field goal.

Pringle made the varsity team for the 1971 season but was dismissed from the team early on for disciplinary reasons. By that point, he had made all five extra point attempts and tied the school record with a 48-yard field goal. Afterwards, Pringle dropped out of school for a year. During this time, he said that he just "piddled around" and "was living on crackers and peanut butter." In 1973, he returned to Rice and was given another chance on the football team. He was the team's top kicker for the 1973 and 1974 seasons, setting a school-record with a 50-yard field goal in the latter year. Pringle concluded his career at Rice having made 27 of 28 extra point attempts and 20 of 29 field goal attempts. He was invited to the Coaches All-America Game where he set the all-star game's record with a 54-yard field goal.

== Professional career ==
Pringle was selected by the Houston Oilers in the 10th round (246th overall) of the 1975 NFL draft. He made two field goals in a preseason game against the New Orleans Saints and finished the preseason having made three of five field goal attempts. He was released by the Oilers prior to the regular season, on September 2, 1975. He then tried out with the Detroit Lions and was signed by them on September 11. The Lions signed him to be a kickoff specialist, as they already had Errol Mann for field goals and extra points. Pringle appeared for the Lions in the season opener, against the Green Bay Packers, but was unable to consistently kick to the end zone and was released following the game on September 22. Pringle later signed with the New England Patriots on April 12, 1976, but was released on July 30, ending his professional career.
