= Marty Akins =

American football player (born 1954)

Martin Akins
Profile
- Positions: Quarterback, kicker, punter, kickoff returner, punt returner
- Class: 1976

Personal information
- Born: January 6, 1954 (age 72); San Saba County, Texas, U.S.
- Listed height: 6 ft 1 in (1.85 m)
- Listed weight: 205 lb (93 kg)

Career information
- High school: Gregory-Portland (Portland, Texas)
- College: Texas

Awards and highlights
- First-team All-American (1975); 1975 Southwest Conference Player of the Year; 1975 Southwest Conference Most Valuable Player; 1975 Dallas Morning News Offensive MVP – SWC; 1975 Houston Post Offensive MVP —- SWC; 1973 Southwest Conference Newcomer of the Year; First-team All-SWC (1975); Southwest Conference Championship – (1972, 1973, 1975)

Martin Ray Akins (born January 6, 1954) is a former college All-American football player and politician. He started as quarterback for the Texas Longhorns in the early 1970s and was the only Longhorn quarterback to start three seasons directing the wishbone offense, and the only wishbone quarterback to ever be an All-American. Akins helped quarterback Texas to 3 Southwest Conference Championships.

== Early life ==
Akins was born in San Saba, Texas. At Gregory-Portland High School, Akins was coached by his father, Ray Akins, a Texas High School Football Hall of Famer with 302 wins in 37 seasons. Akins, captain of his high school team, was selected as the Texas High School 3A Football Player of the Year in 1971 while he led the Wildcats to the 1971 State Championship game. He had a 60–4–1 record as a junior high and high school quarterback. Akins was an All-State Quarterback and Prep All-American Quarterback and was selected Super All-State Punter and Kicker. Akins was also selected as quarterback on the UIL All-Century Football Team 1910–2010. In 2017, his number #10 was retired by Gregory-Portland High School.

Akins also competed in track and field, winning the 1972 Texas State High School Championship in the shot put.

In 1987, Akins joined his father in the Texas High School Football Hall of Fame, where they became the only father/son inductees.

== College career ==
Akins was heavily recruited by many national programs and first accepted an offer from Notre Dame, where he'd always dreamed of going. after being heavily recruited by Longhorn coach Darrell Royal and by former President Lyndon Johnson he changed his mind and decided to stay closer to home.

At Texas, Akins spent his freshman year backing up Alan Lowry. He played in several games as quarterback and also as a kickoff and punt returner and played in the 1973 Cotton Bowl, against Alabama which Texas won. The Longhorns finished the 1972 season ranked #3.

Lowry graduated and by the spring of 1973, Akins had taken over as the starting quarterback. In 1973, Akins started every game, despite suffering a broken big toe in the third game of the season. Texas defied predictions and won its sixth consecutive SWC Championship, but lost to Nebraska in the 1974 Cotton Bowl. He was twice voted Chevrolet Television Player of the game and was chosen the Southwest Conference Newcomer of the Year. Akins played in the Cotton Bowl despite having the flu and a temperature over 102 degrees.

Texas started the 1974 season with a win over Boston College, but Akins suffered a concussion during the win resulting in him being hospitalized. Akins played, but sat out most of the next game against Wyoming.

Akins returned full speed for the remainder of the season. Against Rice, Akins set the record for most rushing yards in a game by a quarterback. Texas came close to winning the SWC for a 7th straight time, but disappointing upsets to unranked Texas Tech and Baylor, as well as #2 (and eventual National Champion) Oklahoma, broke Texas' streak. They finished on a high note, beating TCU 81–16 and upsetting #7 Texas A&M and then went to the Gator Bowl where they lost to #5 Auburn. In the 1974 season Marty Akins was named the Chevrolet Player of the Game in two televised games.

Akins was again the starter in 1975 and now the captain of a team that included future Pro Football Hall of Fame inductee Earl Campbell. Akins led the Longhorns to a 10–2 record, again losing to #2, and eventual National Champion, Oklahoma while beating #20 Arkansas. He was replaced in the TCU game by Ted Constanzo when he tore the anterior cruciate ligament in his right knee, Texas was up 14–3 when he left the game and eventually won 27–11. Two weeks later, after much doubt that he would even play, Akins, with his knee heavily braced, started against #2, undefeated Texas A&M with the Conference title on the line. But he was injured again on Texas' first offensive play and was again replaced by Constanzo. Without All-American Marty Akins – Texas decorated quarterback being on the field the Longhorns lost. Texas A&M won, splitting the Conference Championship with Texas and Arkansas and sending Texas to the Astro-Bluebonnet Bowl. Akins was back in the lineup for the bowl game playing on one leg and led the team to a 38–21 come-from-behind win over Colorado and a final ranking of #9. That season Akins was again twice the Chevrolet Player of the Game in televised games, named to the All-Conference team and became the first and only Wishbone quarterback in College Football history to be named an All-American when the FWAA chose him over AP All-American John Sciara.

Akins finished his football career at the University of Texas with a record of 27–9, the most wins since Bobby Layne won 28.

Akins was inducted into the University of Texas Hall of Honor in 1995 and was selected by the University of Texas as one of the university's 125 Extraordinary Texas Exes.

=== Records ===
- UT – Most rushing yards by a quarterback, game (188), surpassed by Vince Young in 2005
- UT – Most rushing yards by a quarterback, career (2,020), surpassed by Young in 2005
- UT – Quarterback starts, career (35), surpassed by Peter Gardere in 1992
- UT – Most rushing touchdowns by a quarterback, career (26), surpassed by Young in 2005

== Later life and political career ==
Akins was selected in the 11th round of the 1976 NFL draft by the St. Louis Cardinals. Because of injuries, in 1976 he spent his rookie season on the scout team playing defensive back and quarterback and was then traded to the New Orleans Saints in 1977. He played in the exhibition games for the Saints, but because of severe injuries he decided to give up pro ball. He studied law at the University of Houston College of Law, graduated with high honors and became a very successful trial lawyer dealing with environmental, consumer protection, and personal injury cases.

Akins practiced law throughout Texas for many years and retired in 2000 to pursue a career in politics. In 2001, he sought the Democratic nomination for Governor of Texas, but then dropped out to compete for state comptroller instead. Akins won the party's 2002 nomination for the State Comptroller's office, but then lost in the general election to incumbent Carole Keeton Rylander.

Texas Comptroller Election 2002
Party	Candidate	Votes	%	±%
Republican	Carole Keeton Rylander (Incumbent)	2,878,732	64.2	
Democratic	Marty Akins	1,476,976	35.8	

In 2006 Akins was hired as the men's and women's golf head coach for Huston–Tillotson University and remained in that position for two years. In 2009, he was appointed to the Texas State Advisory Board of Athletic Trainers by Governor Rick Perry.

== Family ==
Akins and his wife Pam have three children. Their youngest daughter, Angela Akins, played golf for the TCU Horned Frogs before transferring to the Texas Longhorns for her junior and senior years. She was named to the All-Big XII Academic Team. In July 2017, Angela married professional golfer Sergio García. She became a Golf Channel reporter in 2017.

Marty Akins' nephew is former Purdue starting quarterback Drew Brees, who won Super Bowl XLIV with the New Orleans Saints.
