= 1973 Cotton Bowl Classic =

- 37th Cotton Bowl Classic
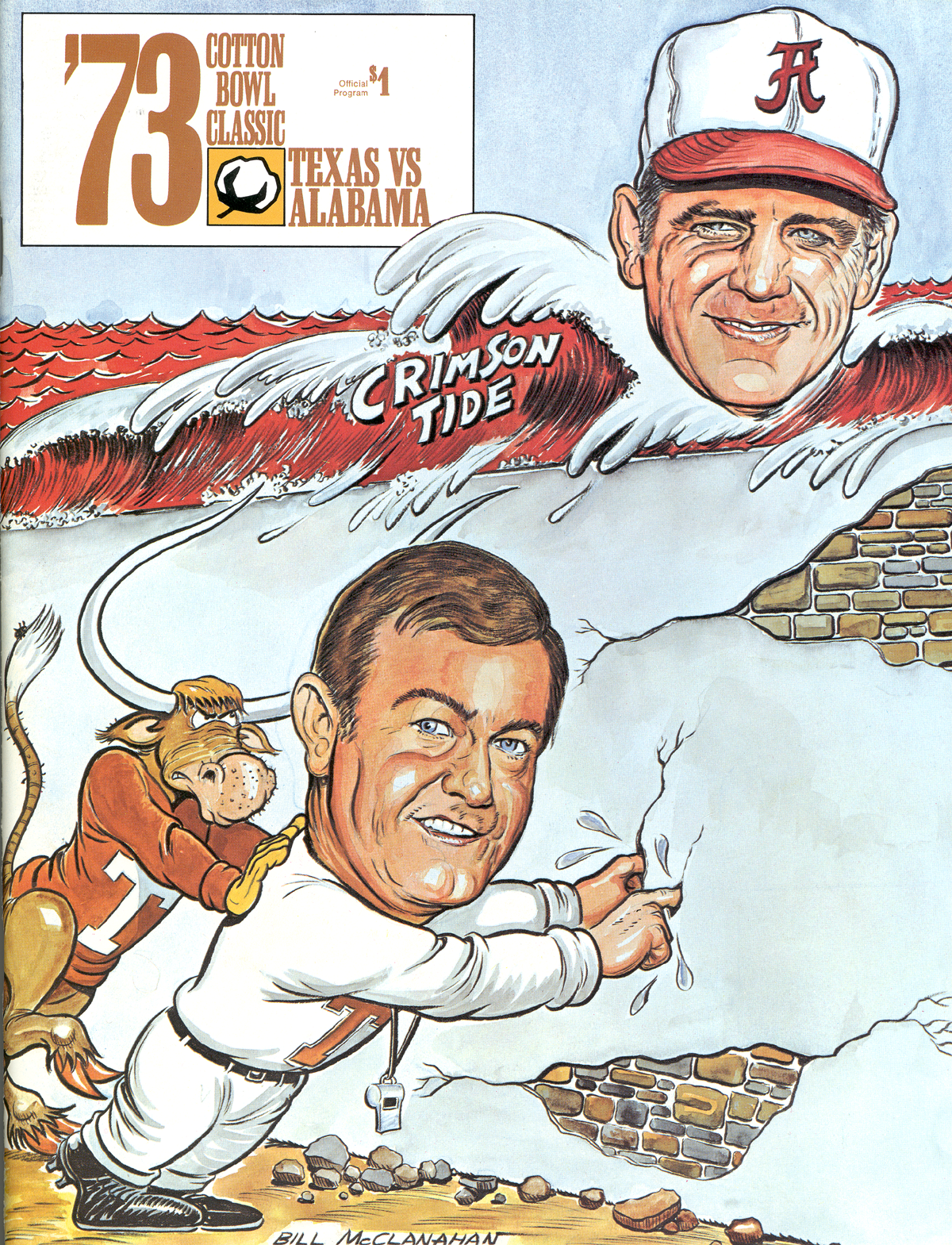
Texas Longhorns	Alabama Crimson Tide
(9–1)	(10–1)
SWC	SEC
17	13
Head coach: Darrell Royal	Head coach: Bear Bryant
AP / Coaches; 7 / 5	AP / Coaches; 4 / 4
	1	2	3	4	Total
Texas	0	3	7	7	17
Alabama	10	3	0	0	13
- Date: January 1, 1973
- Season: 1972
- Stadium: Cotton Bowl
- Location: Dallas, Texas
- MVP: LB Randy Braband (Texas); QB Alan Lowry (Texas)
- Referee: James Artley (SEC; split crew: SEC, SWC)
- Attendance: 72,000

United States TV coverage
- Network: CBS
- Announcers: Lindsey Nelson, Tom Brookshier and Frank Glieber

The Cotton Bowl in Dallas, Texas, hosted the Cotton Bowl Classic.

The 1973 Cotton Bowl Classic, part of the 1972 bowl game season, took place on January 1, 1973, at the Cotton Bowl in Dallas, Texas. The competing teams were the Alabama Crimson Tide, representing the Southeastern Conference (SEC), and the Texas Longhorns, representing the Southwest Conference (SWC). Texas won the game by a final score of 17–13.

== Teams ==
=== Alabama ===
The 1972 Alabama squad finished the regular season with a 10–1 record and as conference champions. Their only loss came against Auburn in the Iron Bowl by a final score of 17–16 in the famous Punt Bama Punt game. Following their victory over Virginia Tech, university officials announced they accepted an invitation to play in the Cotton Bowl. The appearance marked the fourth for Alabama in the Cotton Bowl, their 26th overall bowl game appearance.

=== Texas ===
The 1972 Texas squad finished the regular season with a 9–1 record. Their only loss came against Oklahoma in the Red River Rivalry by a final score of 27–0. Following their victory over TCU, university officials announced they accepted an invitation to play in the Cotton Bowl. The appearance marked the fourteenth for Texas in the Cotton Bowl, their 20th overall bowl game appearance and their fifth straight Cotton Bowl appearance after winning their fifth straight Southwest Conference championship by going undefeated in conference play.

== Game summary ==
Alabama opened the game by going up 10–0 as a result of a pair of Alan Lowry interceptions. Steve Wade made both interceptions for the Crimson Tide, and the first resulted in a 50-yard Greg Gantt field goal and the second a 31-yard Wilbur Jackson touchdown. After trading field goals in the second quarter, Alabama took a 13–3 lead at the half. In the second half, the Texas defense shutout the Alabama offense, and a pair of rushing touchdowns from Longhorn quarterback Alan Lowry from three and 34-yards sealed the 17–13 Texas victory.

Scoring summary

Quarter	Time	Drive			Team	Scoring information	Score	
Quarter	Time	Plays	Yards	TOP	Team	Scoring information	Texas	Alabama
1	10:06		7 plays, 17 yards	3:33	Alabama	50-yard field goal by Greg Gantt	0	3
1	4:49		1 play, 31 yards	00:09	Alabama	Wilbur Jackson 31-yard touchdown run, Bill Davis kick good	0	10
2	13:34		16 plays, 71 yards	6:09	Texas	24-yard field goal by Billy Schott	3	10
2	00:03		7 plays, 66 yards	1:33	Alabama	30-yard field goal by Bill Davis	3	13
3	4:43		15 plays, 59 yards	7:17	Texas	Alan Lowry 3-yard touchdown run, Billy Schott kick good	10	13
4	4:22		7 plays, 80 yards	3:20	Texas	Alan Lowry 34-yard touchdown run, Billy Schott kick good	17	13
"TOP" = time of possession. For other American football terms, see Glossary of American football.							17	13
