= 1972 Astro-Bluebonnet Bowl =

LSU Tigers	Tennessee Volunteers
(9–1–1)	(9–2)
17	24
Head coach: Charles McClendon	Head coach: Bill Battle
AP / Coaches; 10 / 10	AP / Coaches; 11 / 11
	1	2	3	4	Total
LSU	3	0	7	7	17
Tennessee	14	10	0	0	24
- Date: December 30, 1972
- Season: 1972
- Stadium: Houston Astrodome
- Location: Houston, Texas
- Referee: R. Pete Williams (SEC)
- Attendance: 52,961

The 1972 Astro-Bluebonnet Bowl, part of the 1972 bowl game season, took place on December 30, 1972, at the Houston Astrodome in Houston, Texas. The competing teams were the LSU Tigers and Tennessee Volunteers with each team being a member of the Southeastern Conference, although the teams did not meet in the regular season. Tennessee won the game 24–17.

== Teams ==
=== LSU ===
The 1972 LSU Tigers finished the regular season with a 9–1–1 record with its lone loss coming against Alabama and a tie against Florida. The appearance marked the second for LSU in the Astro-Bluebonnet Bowl, and their eighteenth overall bowl game.

=== Tennessee ===
The 1972 Tennessee Volunteers finished the regular season with a 9–2 record with a loss to both Alabama and Auburn. The appearance marked the second for Tennessee in the Astro-Bluebonnet Bowl, and their nineteenth overall bowl game.

== Game summary ==
=== Scoring summary ===
Scoring summary

Quarter	Time	Drive			Team	Scoring information	Score	
Quarter	Time	Plays	Yards	TOP	Team	Scoring information	LSU	Tennessee
1	9:56				LSU	29-yard field goal by Dalton Jackson	3	0
1	5:03				Tennessee	Jimmy Young 32-yard touchdown reception from Condredge Holloway, Ricky Townsend kick good	3	7
1	2:51				Tennessee	Condredge Holloway 15-yard touchdown run, Ricky Townsend kick good	3	14
2	13:47				Tennessee	33-yard field goal by Ricky Townsend	3	17
2	6:10				Tennessee	Condredge Holloway 10-yard touchdown run, Ricky Townsend kick good	3	24
3	7:12				LSU	Bert Jones 2-yard touchdown run, Dalton Jackson kick good	10	24
4	7:26				LSU	Brad Davis 1-yard touchdown run, Dalton Jackson kick good	17	24
"TOP" = time of possession. For other American football terms, see Glossary of American football.							17	24

=== Statistics ===
Statistics	LSU	UT
First downs	18	17
Plays–yards	72–277	60–273
Rushes–yards	52–187	41–179
Passing yards	90	94
Passing: Comp–Att–Int	7–20–1	11–19–1
