= Ralph Jordan =

American football and basketball coach (1910–1980)

- Jordan, c. 1960

Biographical details
- Born: September 25, 1910; Selma, Alabama, U.S.
- Died: July 17, 1980 (aged 69); Auburn, Alabama, U.S.

Playing career

Football
- 1928–1932: Auburn

Basketball
- 1929–1932: Auburn

Baseball
- c. 1930: Auburn
- Positions: Center (football); Guard (basketball); Pitcher (baseball)

Coaching career (HC unless noted)

Football
- 1934–1942: Auburn (assistant)
- 1945: Auburn (assistant)
- 1946: Miami Seahawks (assistant)
- 1947–1950: Georgia (assistant)
- 1951–1975: Auburn

Basketball
- 1933–1942: Auburn
- 1945–1946: Auburn
- 1946–1950: Georgia

Head coaching record
- Overall: 176–83–6 (football); 136–105 (basketball)
- Bowls: 5–7

Accomplishments and honors

Championships
- Football; 2 national (1957–1958); SEC (1957)

Awards
- Football; 4× SEC Coach of the Year (1953, 1957, 1963, 1972)
- College Football Hall of Fame; Inducted in 1982 (profile)

James Ralph "Shug" Jordan (/ʃʊɡ ˈdʒɜːrdən/ SHUUG JUR-dən; September 25, 1910 – July 17, 1980) was an American football, basketball, and baseball player and coach of football and basketball. He served as the head football coach at Auburn University from 1951 to 1975, where he compiled a record of 176–83–6. He has the most wins of any coach in Auburn Tigers football history. Jordan's 1957 Auburn squad went undefeated with a record of 10–0 and was named the national champion by the Associated Press. Jordan was also the head men's basketball coach at Auburn (1933–1942, 1945–1946) and at the University of Georgia (1946–1950), tallying a career college basketball record of 136–103. During his time coaching basketball, he also served as an assistant football coach at the two schools. Auburn's Jordan–Hare Stadium was renamed in Jordan's honor in 1973. Jordan was inducted into the College Football Hall of Fame as a coach in 1982.

== Early years and playing career ==
Born in Selma, Alabama, Jordan was nicknamed "Shug" as a child because of his love for sorghum sugar cane. A 1932 graduate of Auburn, he lettered in football, basketball, and baseball and was voted the Most Outstanding Athlete in 1932, awarded the Porter Loving Cup. Jordan was initiated into Theta Chi fraternity at Auburn, and he started the Delta Beta chapter of Theta Chi at the University of Georgia.

== Early coaching career ==
After graduation, Jordan became the head basketball coach and an assistant football coach at Auburn. In ten seasons (1933–1942, 1945–1946) as the head coach of the Auburn Tigers men's basketball team, he compiled a record of 95–77. Jordan also compiled 45 wins as head basketball coach at Georgia. In addition to having the most wins by a football coach in Auburn history, Jordan ranks fifth in wins among Tigers basketball coaches.

== Military service in World War II ==
During World War II, Jordan fought in four major invasions as a United States Army officer. He saw action in North Africa and Sicily before being wounded in the invasion of Normandy and receiving a Purple Heart and the Bronze Star. After recovering from his wounds, he continued action in the Pacific theater, serving at Okinawa.

== Head football coaching career ==
Prior to being hired as Auburn's head football coach in 1951, Jordan spent one season as an assistant coach of the Miami Seahawks of the All-America Football Conference in 1946, and then four years as an assistant at the University of Georgia. When he became head football coach at Auburn, he retained assistants Shot Senn (linemen), Joel Eaves (defensive ends), and Dick McGowen as head freshmen team coach, all former Auburn players who had assisted Jordan's predecessor, Earl Brown. Jordan also hired George L. "Buck" Bradberry (defensive backfield), Homer Hobbs (assistant line), Gene Lorendo (offensive ends), all former Georgia players, and Charlie Waller (offensive backfield). McGowen also served as Auburn's head baseball coach from 1951 to 1957, while Eaves had also doubled as head basketball coach since 1949 (a post he would hold until 1963).

In 1957 Jordan led Auburn to their first Southeastern Conference title in school history, and their first outright conference title since winning the old Southern Conference in 1932. They were also crowned as national champions by the AP. However, the Tigers had been placed on probation after one of Jordan's assistants paid two high school recruits $500 each, and were thus ineligible for a bowl.

In 1971, Jordan coached quarterback Pat Sullivan to the Heisman Trophy. The next year, Jordan's Tigers upset heavily favored, arch-rival Alabama in the Iron Bowl, a victory which became known as Punt Bama Punt. In 1973, the university renamed Cliff Hare Stadium as Jordan-Hare Stadium in Jordan's honor, the first stadium in the United States to be named for an active coach. Reflecting Auburn's rise to national prominence under his watch, the stadium's capacity more than tripled during his tenure, from 21,600 when he returned to the Plains in 1951 to 61,261 when he retired. When Jordan retired after the 1975 season, he had amassed a record of 176–83–6 for a .675 winning percentage.

== Personal life and death ==
Jordan met Evelyn Walker (1913–2011), a native of Augusta, Georgia, and a student at the University of South Carolina, when Jordan accompanied the Auburn University basketball team to a tournament there in 1934. Jordan and Walker married in 1937 and were the parents of three children. Evelyn Walker Jordan served as a Panhellenic advisor on the Auburn campus and became a licensed couples counsellor.

Jordan died on July 17, 1980, at his home in Auburn, Alabama, after a four-month fight with leukemia.

== Head coaching record ==
=== Football ===
Year	Team	Overall	Conference	Standing	Bowl/playoffs	Coaches^{#}	AP^{°}
Auburn Tigers (Southeastern Conference) (1951–1975)
1951	Auburn	5–5	3–4	6th			
1952	Auburn	2–8	0–7	12th			
1953	Auburn	7–3–1	4–2–1	5th	L Gator		17
1954	Auburn	8–3	3–3	T–6th	W Gator		13
1955	Auburn	8–2–1	5–2–1	3rd	L Gator	8	8
1956	Auburn	7–3	4–3	5th			
1957	Auburn	10–0	7–0	1st		2	1
1958	Auburn	9–0–1	6–0–1	2nd		4	4
1959	Auburn	7–3	4–3	5th		15	
1960	Auburn	8–2	5–2	4th		14	13
1961	Auburn	6–4	3–4	7th			
1962	Auburn	6–3–1	4–3	6th			
1963	Auburn	9–2	6–1	2nd	L Orange	6	5
1964	Auburn	6–4	3–3	6th			
1965	Auburn	5–5–1	4–1–1	2nd	L Liberty		
1966	Auburn	4–6	1–5	8th			
1967	Auburn	6–4	3–3	7th			
1968	Auburn	7–4	4–2	T–3rd	W Sun		16
1969	Auburn	8–3	5–2	3rd	L Astro-Bluebonnet	15	20
1970	Auburn	9–2	5–2	3rd	W Gator	9	10
1971	Auburn	9–2	5–1	T–2nd	L Sugar	5	12
1972	Auburn	10–1	6–1	2nd	W Gator	7	5
1973	Auburn	6–6	2–5	T–8th	L Sun		
1974	Auburn	10–2	4–2	T–2nd	W Gator	6	8
1975	Auburn	4–6–1	2–4	T–6th			
Auburn:		176–83–6	98–65–4				
Total:		176–83–6					
National championship Conference title Conference division title or championship game berth
^{#}Rankings from final Coaches Poll.; ^{°}Rankings from final AP Poll.

=== Basketball ===
Record table
Season	Team	Overall	Conference	Standing	Postseason
Auburn Tigers (Southeastern Conference) (1933–1942)
1933–34	Auburn	2–11	2–9	12th	
1934–35	Auburn	4–13	3–9	11th	
1935–36	Auburn	10–7	7–4	5th	
1936–37	Auburn	11–4	7–4	4th	
1937–38	Auburn	14–5	6–3	4th	
1938–39	Auburn	16–6	6–4	4th	
1939–40	Auburn	7–10	6–7	8th	
1940–41	Auburn	13–6	6–5	6th	
1941–42	Auburn	11–6	9–5	5th	
Auburn Tigers (Southeastern Conference) (1945–1946)
1945–46	Auburn	7–9	7–6	5th	
Auburn:		95–77	59–56		
Georgia Bulldogs (Southeastern Conference) (1946–1950)
1946–47	Georgia	5–14	4–9	T–9th	
1947–48	Georgia	18–10	6–8	6th	
1948–49	Georgia	17–13	6–9	8th	
1949–50	Georgia	4–2 (Note: Jordan served as head coach for the first six games of the season before he was replaced by Jim Whatley, who led the team for the remainder of the year. Georgia finished 15–9 overall and 6–7 in conference play, placing sixth in the SEC.)	0–2		
Georgia:		44–39	16–28		
Total:		136–105			

== Honors and awards ==
- Alabama Sports Hall of Fame (1969)
- Alabama Academy of Honor (1972)
- National Football Foundation Hall of Fame (1982)
- Senior Bowl Hall of Fame (1993)
