= 1972 Alabama Crimson Tide football team =

American college football season

1972 Alabama Crimson Tide football

SEC champion

Cotton Bowl Classic, L 13–17 vs. Texas
- Conference: Southeastern Conference

Ranking
- Coaches: No. 4
- AP: No. 7
- Record: 10–2 (7–1 SEC)
- Head coach: Bear Bryant (15th season)
- Offensive scheme: Wishbone
- Base defense: 5–2
- Captains: Terry Davis; Robin Parkhouse
- Home stadium: Denny Stadium; Legion Field

1972 Southeastern Conference football standings
	Conf.					Overall
Team	W		L		T	W		L		T
No. 7 Alabama $	7	–	1	–	0	10	–	2	–	0
No. 5 Auburn	6	–	1	–	0	10	–	1	–	0
No. 11 LSU	4	–	1	–	1	9	–	2	–	1
No. 8 Tennessee	4	–	2	–	0	10	–	2	–	0
Georgia	4	–	3	–	0	7	–	4	–	0
Florida	3	–	3	–	1	5	–	5	–	1
Ole Miss	2	–	5	–	0	5	–	5	–	0
Kentucky	2	–	5	–	0	3	–	8	–	0
Mississippi State	1	–	6	–	0	4	–	7	–	0
Vanderbilt	0	–	6	–	0	3	–	8	–	0
$ – Conference champion; Rankings from AP Poll

The 1972 Alabama Crimson Tide football team (variously "Alabama", "UA" or "Bama") represented the University of Alabama in the 1972 NCAA University Division football season. It was the Crimson Tide's 78th overall season and 39th season as a member of the Southeastern Conference (SEC). The team was led by head coach Bear Bryant, in his 15th year, and played their home games at Denny Stadium in Tuscaloosa and Legion Field in Birmingham, Alabama. They finished the season with ten wins and two losses (10–2 overall, 7–1 in the SEC), as SEC champions and with a loss to Texas in the Cotton Bowl Classic.

Alabama opened the season with a non-conference victory over Duke. They then shut out Kentucky in their conference opener, and then easily won their next three games, over Vanderbilt, Georgia and Florida. In a top-ten match-up against rival Tennessee, they scored a pair of fourth-quarter touchdowns en route to a 17–10 victory. Next, the Crimson Tide defeated Southern Miss and Mississippi State to set up a top-ten match-up against LSU.

With a 35–21 victory over the Tigers, Alabama captured the SEC championship for the 1972 season. The Crimson Tide next defeated Virginia Tech on homecoming and set up another top ten match-up Iron Bowl to close the regular season. Auburn defeated Alabama behind a pair of fourth-quarter blocked-punt returns in a game referred to as simply "Punt Bama Punt". The Crimson Tide then closed their season with a second-consecutive defeat, this time against Texas in the Cotton Bowl Classic.

== Schedule ==
Date	Opponent	Rank	Site	TV	Result	Attendance
September 9	Duke*	No. 7	Legion Field; Birmingham, AL		W 35–12	71,281
September 23	Kentucky	No. 7	Legion Field; Birmingham, AL		W 35–0	71,433
September 30	Vanderbilt	No. 6	Denny Stadium; Tuscaloosa, AL		W 48–21	56,179
October 7	at Georgia	No. 4	Sanford Stadium; Athens, GA (rivalry)		W 25–7	60,013
October 14	Florida	No. 3	Denny Stadium; Tuscaloosa, AL (rivalry)		W 24–7	57,631
October 21	at No. 10 Tennessee	No. 3	Neyland Stadium; Knoxville, TN (Third Saturday in October)		W 17–10	72,049
October 28	Southern Miss*	No. 2	Legion Field; Birmingham, AL		W 48–11	57,090
November 4	Mississippi State	No. 2	Denny Stadium; Tuscaloosa, AL (rivalry)		W 58–14	57,171
November 11	No. 6 LSU	No. 2	Legion Field; Birmingham, AL (rivalry)	ABC	W 35–21	72,039
November 18	Virginia Tech*^{†}	No. 2	Denny Stadium; Tuscaloosa, AL		W 52–13	57,162
December 2	vs. No. 9 Auburn	No. 2	Legion Field; Birmingham, AL (Iron Bowl)		L 16–17	72,386
January 1, 1973	vs. No. 7 Texas*	No. 4	Cotton Bowl; Dallas, TX (Cotton Bowl Classic)	CBS	L 13–17	70,000
*Non-conference game; ^{†}Homecoming; Rankings from AP Poll released prior to the game

== Rankings ==
Ranking movements Legend: ██ Increase in ranking ██ Decrease in ranking ( ) = First-place votes
	Week														
Poll	Pre	1	2	3	4	5	6	7	8	9	10	11	12	13	Final
AP	7	5	7	6	4	3	3	2 (2)	2 (3)	2 (3)	2 (5)	2 (5)	2 (4)	4	7
Coaches	7	5 (2)	6 (1)	5 (1)	3 (1)	3 (1)	3 (1)	2 (2)	2 (2)	3 (2)	2 (3)	2 (3)	2 (3)	4	Not released

== Game summaries ==
=== Duke ===
Team	1	2	3	4	Total
Duke	0	12	0	0	12
• #7 Alabama	14	0	7	14	35

- Date: September 9
- Location: Legion Field
  Birmingham, AL
- Game attendance: 71,281

Alabama opened the 1972 season ranked as the No. 7 team in the preseason AP Poll as they entered their game against Duke. At Legion Field, the Crimson Tide scored 21 unanswered points in the second half en route to a 35–12 victory over the Blue Devils to open the 1971 season. Alabama opened the game with a 14–0 lead after they scored on their first two possessions, on a pair of touchdown runs of eight-yards by Paul Spivey and one-yard by Joe LaBue. However, Duke was able to make the halftime score 14–12 after they scored on a pair of Robert Albright touchdown passes. The first was from 11-yards to Mark Landon and the second to Mike Bomgardner from eight-yards out.

After Terry Davis extended the Crimson Tide lead to 21–12 with his two-yard run in the third, Alabama closed the game with a pair of touchdown runs in the fourth quarter. The first was scored by Steve Bisceglia on a 39-yard run and the second by Wilbur Jackson on a 12-yard run. In the game, Alabama outgained the Blue Devils in rushing yards 333 to 156.

=== Kentucky ===
Team	1	2	3	4	Total
Kentucky	0	0	0	0	0
• #7 Alabama	14	0	7	14	35

- Date: September 23
- Location: Legion Field
  Birmingham, AL
- Game attendance: 71,433

Coming off their bye week, the Crimson Tide retained their No. 7 team in the AP Poll prior to their game against Kentucky. In what was the first meeting against the Wildcats since their victory in 1947, Alabama won 35–0 at Birmingham. The Crimson Tide took a 14–0 lead in the first quarter after Terry Davis threw a seven-yard touchdown pass to Wayne Wheeler and then scored himself on a three-yard run. Still up only 14–0 as the teams entered the second half, Alabama extended their lead to 21–0 on a three-yard Steve Bisceglia touchdown run.

The Crimson Tide then closed the game with a pair of fourth-quarter touchdowns. The first came on a nine-yard Bisceglia run and the second on a 48-yard Gary Rutledge pass to Ralph Stokes that made the final score 35–0. In their previous meeting, Kentucky was led by head coach Bear Bryant, who since that time had moved on and was Alabama's head coach for this game.

=== Vanderbilt ===
Team	1	2	3	4	Total
Vanderbilt	7	0	7	7	21
• #6 Alabama	6	28	7	7	48

- Date: September 30
- Location: Denny Stadium
  Tuscaloosa, AL
- Game attendance: 56,179

After their victory over Kentucky, Alabama moved into the No. 6 position in the AP Poll prior to their game against Vanderbilt. Behind a 28-point second quarter, the Crimson Tide defeated the Commodores 48–21 in the first Denny Stadium game of the season. After Alabama took a 6–0 lead on a four-yard Wilbur Jackson touchdown run, Vanderbilt responded and took a 7–6 lead on a one-yard Walter Overton later in the first quarter. The Crimson Tide responded with four touchdowns in the second quarter and took a 34–7 halftime lead. The points were scored on runs of three and 16-yards by Ellis Beck, one-yard by Terry Davis and one-yard by Steve Dean.

In the second half, both teams traded touchdowns in each of the final two quarters. In the third, Gary Rutledge scored on a seven-yard run for Alabama and Steve Burger responded for Vanderbilt with his three-yard run. Finally in the fourth quarter, Rutledge scored on a five-yard run for the Crimson Tide and Stephen Lainhart followed with a 51-yard touchdown pass to Douglas Martin for the Commodores that made the final score 48–21.

=== Georgia ===
Team	1	2	3	4	Total
• #4 Alabama	7	0	12	6	25
Georgia	0	0	0	7	7

- Date: October 7
- Location: Sanford Stadium
  Athens, GA
- Game attendance: 60,013

After their victory over Vanderbilt, Alabama moved into the No. 4 position in the AP Poll prior to their game against Georgia. Playing for the first time since a loss to Georgia in 1965, the Crimson Tide defeated the Bulldogs 25–7 in their first road game of the season. Alabama scored their only points in the first half on a five-yard Wilbur Jackson touchdown run in the first quarter.

In the third quarter, Terry Davis first threw a 39-yard touchdown pass to Wayne Wheeler and later scored on a one-yard run that made the score 19–0. After Jimmy Poulos scored Georgia's only points with his 17-yard touchdown run in the fourth, Alabama closed the game with a two-yard Steve Bisceglia that made the final score 25–7.

=== Florida ===
Team	1	2	3	4	Total
Florida	7	0	0	0	7
• #3 Alabama	7	3	7	7	24

- Date: October 14
- Location: Denny Stadium
  Tuscaloosa, AL
- Game attendance: 57,631

After their victory over Georgia, Alabama moved into the No. 3 position in the AP Poll prior to their game against Florida. Against the Gators, the Crimson Tide rallied from an early 7–0 deficit and defeated Florida 24–7 at Denny Stadium. Florida took an early 7–0 lead behind a 60-yard Nat Moore touchdown run. However, the Gators were unable to score again as Alabama responded with 24 unanswered points. After a 13-yard Paul Spivey touchdown run tied the game 7–7 later in the first, a 31-yard Bill Davis field goal in the second gave the Crimson Tide a 10–7 halftime lead. They then closed the game with a pair of touchdown runs that made the final score 24–7. The first came on a four-yard Terry Davis run in the third and then on a one-yard Ralph Stokes run in the fourth.

=== Tennessee ===
Third Saturday in October

Team	1	2	3	4	Total
• #3 Alabama	0	3	0	14	17
#10 Tennessee	0	0	7	3	10

- Date: October 21
- Location: Neyland Stadium
  Knoxville, TN
- Game attendance: 72,049

After their victory over Florida, Alabama retained their No. 3 position and Tennessee moved into the No. 10 position in the AP Poll prior to their game at Neyland Stadium. Against the Volunteers, Alabama scored two touchdowns in the final 2:39 of the game for a 17–10, come-from-behind victory at Knoxville. After a scoreless first quarter, the Crimson Tide took a 3–0 lead into halftime after Bill Davis connected on a 31-yard field goal in the second. Tennessee then took a 7–3 lead on a two-yard Condredge Holloway touchdown run in the third, and extended it to 10–3 with a 36-yard Ricky Townsend field goal in the fourth quarter.

With 2:39 left in the game, Alabama took possession at the Vols 48-yard line, and three plays later Wilbur Jackson scored on a two-yard run. On the Tennessee possession that ensued, John Mitchell recovered a Holloway fumble at the Vols' 17-yard line. On the next play, Terry Davis gave Alabama a 17–10 lead with his touchdown run with just over one minute left in the game.

=== Southern Miss ===
Team	1	2	3	4	Total
Southern Miss	0	3	0	8	11
• #2 Alabama	7	0	21	20	48

- Date: October 28
- Location: Legion Field
  Birmingham, AL
- Game attendance: 57,090

After their come-from-behind victory over Tennessee, Alabama moved into the No. 2 position in the AP Poll prior to their game against Southern Miss. Although they only led the Golden Eagles 7–3 at halftime, 41 second half points resulted in a 48–11 Alabama victory at Legion Field. In what was a very low scoring first half, the Crimson Tide scored on a two-yard Steve Bisceglia touchdown run and the Golden Eagles on a 32-yard Ricky Palmer field goal for a 7–3 halftime score.

Alabama then dominated the second half and scored five offensive touchdowns in six total possessions en route to the 48–11 victory. Third quarter touchdowns were scored on runs of 12, 16 and five-yards by Bisceglia, Wilbur Jackson and Paul Spivey. Southern Miss responded with their lone points of the second half early in the fourth when Buddy Palazzo connected with Marshall Veal on a 12-yard touchdown pass. The Crimson Tide then closed the game with touchdowns on a 64-yard Gary Rutledge pass to Wayne Wheeler, a 15-yard Robin Cary interception return and on a 13-yard Robert Fraley pass to Pete Pappas for the 48–11 win.

=== Mississippi State ===
Team	1	2	3	4	Total
Mississippi State	0	6	8	0	14
• #2 Alabama	17	13	7	21	58

- Date: November 4
- Location: Denny Stadium
  Tuscaloosa, AL
- Game attendance: 57,171

As they entered their game against Mississippi State, Alabama retained their No. 2 position in the AP Poll. Against the Bulldogs, the Crimson Tide won 58–14 en route to their 25th consecutive victory at Denny Stadium. Alabama took a 17–0 lead in the first quarter behind touchdown runs of 28 and one-yard by Terry Davis and Steve Bisceglia and a 22-yard field goal by Bill Davis. After the Bulldogs responded with a one-yard Wayne Jones touchdown run early in the second, the Crimson Tide extended their lead to 30–6 at halftime behind a 15-yard David McMakin blocked punt return and one-yard Ellis Beck touchdown run.

In the third, both teams traded touchdowns. Alabama scored first on a 44-yard Davis pass to Wayne Wheeler and State followed with a 47-yard Frank Dowsing punt return that made the score 37–14. The Crimson Tide then closed the game with a trio of fourth quarter touchdowns on a 20-yard Gary Rutledge pass to Wheeler and runs of one and two-yards by Robert Fraley and Vern Wilmot.

=== LSU ===
Team	1	2	3	4	Total
#6 LSU	7	0	7	7	21
• #2 Alabama	0	7	14	14	35

- Date: November 11
- Location: Legion Field
  Birmingham, AL
- Game attendance: 72,039

After their victory over Mississippi State, Alabama retained their No. 2 position and LSU was in the No. 6 position in the AP Poll prior to their match-up at Birmingham. Playing in a regionally televised game on ABC, Alabama defeated the previously undefeated Tigers 35–21 at Legion Field and captured the 1972 conference championship. LSU took a 7–0 first quarter lead on a 21-yard Bert Jones touchdown pass to Jimmy LeDoux. Alabama responded with a 25-yard Terry Davis touchdown pass to Wayne Wheeler in the second that tied the game 7–7 at halftime.

In the third, the Crimson Tide took a 21–7 lead behind touchdowns scored on a 29-yard Davis pass to Wheeler and on a 25-yard Davis run. LSU then cut the lead to 21–14 on a five-yard Jones pass to Charles Williamson later in the quarter. In the fourth, Alabama scored on touchdown runs of one and 52-yards by Steve Bisceglia and Joe LaBue, and LSU scored on a three-yard Jones run that made the final score 35–21.

=== Virginia Tech ===
Team	1	2	3	4	Total
Virginia Tech	0	0	6	7	13
• #2 Alabama	14	17	7	14	52

- Date: November 18
- Location: Denny Stadium
  Tuscaloosa, AL
- Game attendance: 57,162

After their victory over LSU, Alabama retained their No. 2 position prior to their match-up against Virginia Tech at Tuscaloosa. After their 52–13 victory over the Hokies on homecoming at Tuscaloosa, the Crimson Tide accepted an invitation to play in the Cotton Bowl Classic. Alabama opened with a pair of first quarter touchdowns on runs of 67-yards by Wilbur Jackson and two-yards by Terry Davis. They next extended their lead to 31–0 at halftime behind a 36-yard Bill Davis field goal and touchdown runs of nine-yards by Jackson and two-yards by Randy Billingsley.

After the Crimson Tide extended their lead on a one-yard Steve Bisceglia touchdown run in the third, the Hokies scored their first points on a five-yard J. B. Barber touchdown run that made the score 38–6. The game concluded after both teams traded touchdowns in the final quarter. After Gary Rutledge scored for Alabama with his one-yard run, Don Strock threw a ten-yard touchdown pass to Craig Valentine. The Crimson Tide then made the final score 52–13 after Robert Fraley threw a 21-yard touchdown pass to Pete Pappas late in the fourth quarter.

=== Auburn ===
Iron Bowl

Team	1	2	3	4	Total
• #9 Auburn	0	0	0	17	17
#2 Alabama	0	9	7	0	16

- Date: December 2
- Location: Legion Field
  Birmingham, AL
- Game attendance: 72,386

As they entered their annual rivalry game against Auburn, Alabama retained their No. 2 position and the Tigers were in the No. 9 position in the AP Poll prior to their match-up in the Iron Bowl. In what was one of the most memorable games in the history of the rivalry, Auburn won 17–16 after they scored a pair of fourth quarter touchdowns on blocked punt returns in a game subsequently deemed "Punt Bama Punt". After a scoreless first quarter, Alabama took a 9–0 halftime lead after Steve Bisceglia scored on a three-yard touchdown run and Bill Davis connected on a 24-yard field goal. The Crimson Tide extended their lead to 16–0 after Wilbur Jackson scored on a six-yard touchdown run in the third before Auburn started their dramatic comeback in the fourth.

The Tigers scored their first points on a 42-yard Gardner Jett field goal that cut the lead to 16–3. Late in the quarter, Bill Newton blocked a Greg Gantt punt and David Langner returned it 25-yards for an Auburn touchdown and cut the lead further to 16–10. After the Tigers defense forced another Alabama punt on the next series, Newton blocked a second Greg Gantt punt and Langner returned it 20-yards for the 17–16 victory.

=== Texas ===
Cotton Bowl Classic

Team	1	2	3	4	Total
• #7 Texas	0	3	7	7	17
#4 Alabama	10	3	0	0	13

- Date: January 1
- Location: Cotton Bowl
  Dallas, TX
- Game attendance: 72,000

In what was the finale of the 1972 season, Alabama was upset by the Texas Longhorns 17–13 in the Cotton Bowl. The Crimson Tide took a 10–0 first quarter lead behind a 50-yard Greg Gantt field goal and a 31-yard Wilbur Jackson touchdown run. Second quarter field goals of 24-yards by Billy Schott of Texas and 30-yards by Bill Davis of Alabama made the halftime score 13–3.

In the third, the Longhorns scored on a three-yard Alan Lowry touchdown run and Lowey then scored the game-winning points with his 34-yard touchdown run in the fourth.

== NFL draft ==
Several players that were varsity lettermen from the 1972 squad were drafted into the National Football League (NFL) in the 1973, 1974 and 1975 drafts. These players included:

Year	Round	Overall	Player name	Position	NFL team
1973 NFL draft	1	4	John Hannah	Offensive guard	New England Patriots
1973 NFL draft	7	174	John Mitchell	Defensive end	San Francisco 49ers
1973 NFL draft	12	309	Jim Krapf	Guard	Oakland Raiders
1974 NFL draft	1	9	Wilbur Jackson	Running back	San Francisco 49ers
1974 NFL draft	3	54	Wayne Wheeler	Wide receiver	Chicago Bears
1974 NFL draft	6	138	Mike Raines	Defensive tackle	San Francisco 49ers
1974 NFL draft	8	187	Greg Gantt	Punter	New York Jets
1974 NFL draft	16	2	Buddy Brown	Guard	New York Giants
1975 NFL draft	3	53	Mike Washington	Defensive back	Baltimore Colts
1975 NFL draft	8	195	Ricky Davis	Defensive back	Cincinnati Bengals

== Freshman squad ==
Prior to the 1972 NCAA University Division football season, NCAA rules prohibited freshmen from participating on the varsity team, and as such many schools fielded freshman teams. The Alabama freshman squad was led by coach Clem Gryska for the 1972 season and finished with a record of four wins and one loss (4–1). The Baby Tide opened the season with a 14–7 loss to Georgia Tech before 7,000 fans at Grant Field. Ray Bolden scored Alabama's only points with his two-yard touchdown run and the offense had six turnovers in the loss. Although they had eight fumbles in their game at Vanderbilt, the Baby Tide won the game 21–13. After Vandy took a 7–0 lead on a six-yard Larry Polston touchdown run in the first, Alabama responded three minutes later and tied the game when Alan Pizzitola returned an interception 25-yards for a score. The Commodores retook a 13–7 lead early in the second quarter after Ed Oaks threw an 18-yard touchdown pass to Matt Gossage and retained their lead through halftime. The Baby Tide then closed the game with a pair of third quarter touchdown runs for the 21–13 victory. The first came on a six-yard Joey Bolton run and the second on a five-yard Willy Shelby run.

In their first home game of the season, Alabama defeated Tennessee 34–21 at Denny Stadium. With just over four minutes left in the game and the score tied 21–21, the Baby Tide scores a pair of late touchdowns after Tennessee turnovers for a 34–21 victory. Both touchdowns were scored by, Richard Todd first from 35-yards and the second from two-yards out. Against Tulane, Alabama rallied from a 10-point deficit with just under six minutes left in the game for a 21–20 victory at Denny Stadium. Alabama took a 7–0 lead on the third play of the game when Willy Shelby scored on an 82-yard touchdown run. However, The Green Wave responded with a pair of touchdowns on a one-yard Gary Rudick run and a 67-yard Wyatt Washington punt return that made the score 14–7 in their favor at the end of the first quarter. A 39-yard Mike Davis field goal cut the Tulane lead to 14–10 at halftime. After a one-yard Wally Harris touchdown run early in the fourth extended the Green Wave lead to 20–10, Alabama closed the game with a 29-yard Davis field goal and an 11-yard Mike Stock touchdown run for the 21–20 victory.

In their final game at Auburn, the Baby Tide for the third consecutive game came from behind and defeated the Tigers 17–14. After a scoreless first, a 24-yard Mike Davis field goal gave Alabama a 3–0 lead in the second quarter. However, Auburn took a 7 halftime lead after Mitzie Jackson scored on a short run in the final second of the first half. The Tigers then extended their lead to 14–3 early in the third quarter when Jack Verucchi scored on a 40-yard touchdown run that capped their opening drive of the second half. Alabama then closed the game with touchdowns on a short Richard Todd run in the third and on a Stock run in the fourth. This game also marked the final played by a freshman team at Alabama as the NCAA changed their rules and allowed freshmen to compete with the varsity squad starting in 1973.

== Roster ==
1972 Alabama Crimson Tide football team roster
Players
Coaches
Offense

Pos.	#	Name	Class
FB	35	Ellis Beck	Jr
RB	22	Randy Billingsley	So
FB	44	Steve Bisceglia	Sr
RB	38	Duffy Boles	So
G	65	Buddy Brown	Jr
OT	70	Bob Bryan	So
FB	43	Richard Bryan	So
C	59	Chip Burke	So
TE	47	Wayne Cotton	Jr
OT	75	Allen Cox	Jr
TE	94	Sylvester Croom	So
QB	10	Terry Davis	Sr
RB	46	Steve Dean	Jr
G	79	Mike Denson	Jr
RB	41	Joe Doughty	So
TE	86	Warren Dyar	Jr
C	69	Mike Eckenrod	Jr
QB	12	Robert Fraley	So
G	62	Tommy Ford	Jr
OT	73	John Hannah	Sr
RB	84	Joe Dale Harris	So
QB	17	Butch Hobson	Sr
FB	31	Bob Holmes	So
OT	60	Morris Hunt	Jr
WR	80	Wilbur Jackson	Jr
WR	19	Pat Keever	So
RB	39	David Knapp	Sr
OT	66	Steve Kulback	So
RB	30	Joe LaBue	Sr
C	58	Rand Lambert	So
C	54	Jim Krapf	Sr
TE	87	Randy Moore	Jr
RB	20	Phil Murphy	So
TE	28	Tom Nelson	So
WR	6	Pete Pappas	So
G	71	Steve Patterson	So
TE		George Pugh	Fr
C	53	Pat Raines	Sr
QB	15	Danny Ridgeway	So
G	61	John Rogers	So
G	68	Rick Rogers	Jr
QB	11	Gary Rutledge	So
QB	14	Billy Sexton	Jr
SE	16	Johnny Sharpless	Jr
RB	24	Paul Spivey	Jr
OT	78	Steve Sprayberry	Jr
WR	34	Tommy Steakley	Sr
RB	42	Ralph Stokes	So
WR	88	Danny Taylor	Jr
RB	27	James Taylor	So
WR	82	Wayne Wheeler	Jr
G	72	Richard Whitley	So
WR	92	Dexter Wood	Jr
OT	67	Rudy Wooten	So

Defense

Pos.	#	Name	Class
S	21	Wayne Atkinson	Sr
DE	96	Ronnie Joe Barnes	So
LB	25	Jeff Blitz	Jr
DB	48	Robin Cary	Jr
DT	98	Dave Capan	So
LB	52	Andy Cross	Sr
DE	83	John Croyle	Jr
DB	19	Ricky Davis	So
DB	37	Jimmy Dawson	So
DB	41	Joe Doughty	So
LB	57	Mike DuBose	So
DT	76	Doug Faust	Jr
DE	91	Don Groves	So
DT	62	Randy Hall	So
LB	50	Wayne Hall	Jr
DE	89	Ed Hines	Sr
DT	95	Skip Kubelius	Jr
WR	81	Darrell Owen	Jr
DT	99	Greg Mantooth	So
DE	85	Rick Meadows	So
LB	77	Ray Maxwell	So
DB	26	Bob McKinney	Sr
DB	18	David McMakin	Jr
LB	51	Noah Miller	So
DE	97	John Mitchell	Sr
DE	90	Butch Norman	Jr
DB	40	Lanny Norris	Sr
SO	33	Mark Prudhomme	Sr
DT	74	Max Raines	Jr
DB	23	Mike Riley	So
LB	55	Ronnie Robertson	So
LB	56	Jeff Rouzie	Sr
DB	29	Robby Rowan	Jr
LB	36	Chuck Strickland	Jr
S	32	Steve Wade	Sr
DB	34	Mike Washington	So
DE	93	David Watkins	So
LB	49	Gary Yelvington	So

Special teams

Pos.	#	Name	Class
PK	1	Bill Davis	Jr
PK	8	Greg Gantt	Jr

Head coach

- Bear Bryant (15th year, Alabama)

Coordinators/assistant coaches

- Ken Donahue (9th year, Tennessee)
- Pat Dye (8th year, Georgia)
- Danny Ford (1st year, Alabama)
- Jim Goostree (16th year, Tennessee)
- Clem Gryska (13th year, Alabama)
- Dude Hennessey (13th year, Kentucky)
- Bobby Marks (1st year, Texas A&M)
- Ken Martin (2nd year, Alabama)
- Bud Moore (1st year, Alabama)
- Mal Moore (9th year, Alabama)
- Bill Oliver (2nd year, Alabama)
- Dee Powell (9th year, Texas A&M)
- Jack Rutledge (7th year, Alabama)
- Jimmy Sharpe (10th year, Alabama)

Legend

- (C) Team captain
- (S) Suspended
- (I) Ineligible
- Injured
- Redshirt

Roster
Last update: October 15, 2013
