= 1972 Mississippi State Bulldogs football team =

American college football season

1972 Mississippi State Bulldogs football
- Conference: Southeastern Conference
- Record: 4–7 (1–6 SEC)
- Head coach: Charles Shira (6th season)
- Home stadium: Scott Field; Mississippi Veterans Memorial Stadium

1972 Southeastern Conference football standings
	Conf.					Overall
Team	W		L		T	W		L		T
No. 7 Alabama $	7	–	1	–	0	10	–	2	–	0
No. 5 Auburn	6	–	1	–	0	10	–	1	–	0
No. 11 LSU	4	–	1	–	1	9	–	2	–	1
No. 8 Tennessee	4	–	2	–	0	10	–	2	–	0
Georgia	4	–	3	–	0	7	–	4	–	0
Florida	3	–	3	–	1	5	–	5	–	1
Ole Miss	2	–	5	–	0	5	–	5	–	0
Kentucky	2	–	5	–	0	3	–	8	–	0
Mississippi State	1	–	6	–	0	4	–	7	–	0
Vanderbilt	0	–	6	–	0	3	–	8	–	0
$ – Conference champion; Rankings from AP Poll

The 1972 Mississippi State Bulldogs football team represented Mississippi State University during the 1972 NCAA University Division football season. After the season, head coach Charles Shira, who had compiled a 16–45–2 record over six seasons, stepped down and focused solely on athletic director duties.

== Schedule ==
Date	Opponent	Site	Result	Attendance	Source
September 9	Auburn	Mississippi Veterans Memorial Stadium; Jackson, MS	L 3–14	40,000	
September 16	Northeast Louisiana*	Scott Field; Starkville, MS	W 42–7	21,000	
September 23	at Vanderbilt	Dudley Field; Nashville, TN	W 10–6	21,374	
September 30	at Florida	Florida Field; Gainesville, FL	L 13–28	42,712	
October 7	at Kentucky	McLean Stadium; Lexington, KY	L 13–17	37,500	
October 14	Florida State*	Mississippi Veterans Memorial Stadium; Jackson, MS	L 21–25	30,000	
October 21	Southern Miss*	Scott Field; Starkville, MS	W 26–7	26,000	
October 28	Houston*^{†}	Scott Field; Starkville, MS	W 27–13	29,000	
November 4	at No. 2 Alabama	Denny Stadium; Tuscaloosa, AL (rivalry)	L 14–58	57,171	
November 18	at No. 8 LSU	Tiger Stadium; Baton Rouge, LA (rivalry)	L 14–28	60,589	
November 25	at Ole Miss	Hemingway Stadium; Oxford, MS (Egg Bowl)	L 14–51	33,586	
*Non-conference game; ^{†}Homecoming; Rankings from AP Poll released prior to the game
