= Billy Kinard =

American football player and coach (1933–2018)

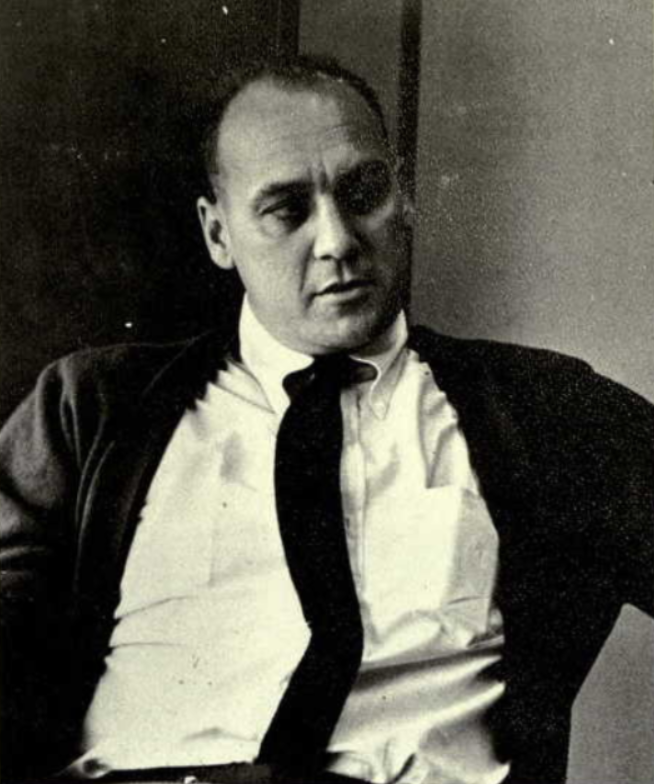
- Kinard from 1967 Seminole yearbook

No. 36, 25, 24
- Positions: Defensive back, halfback

Personal information
- Born: December 16, 1933; Jackson, Mississippi, U.S.
- Died: July 2, 2018 (aged 84); Fort Payne, Alabama, U.S.
- Listed height: 6 ft 0 in (1.83 m)
- Listed weight: 189 lb (86 kg)

Career information
- High school: Central (Jackson)
- College: Ole Miss
- NFL draft: 1956: 2nd round, 25th overall pick

Career history

Playing
- Cleveland Browns (1956); Green Bay Packers (1957–1958); Buffalo Bills (1960)

Coaching
- Mainland HS (FL) (1959) Head coach; Auburn (1961–1963) Assistant; Florida (1964–1966) Defensive backs; Georgia (1967–1969) Assistant; Arkansas (1970) Assistant; Ole Miss (1971–1973) Head coach; Green Bay Packers (1974–1975) Defensive backs; Cleveland Browns (1976–1977) Defensive backs; Gardner–Webb (1978) Head coach; New England Patriots (1979–1980) Defensive backs

Career NFL/AFL statistics
- Interceptions: 4
- Fumble recoveries: 2
- Stats at Pro Football Reference

Head coaching record
- Regular season: 20–14–1 (.586)

Billy Russell Kinard (December 16, 1933 – June 30, 2018) was an American football player and coach. He played professionally as a defensive back for the Cleveland Browns and Green Bay Packers of the National Football League (NFL) and the Buffalo Bills of the American Football League (AFL). Kinard played college football at the University of Mississippi (Ole Miss) before being drafted by the Cleveland Browns in the second round of the 1956 NFL draft. He played professionally for four seasons and retired in 1960. Kinard later served as the head football coach at Ole Miss from 1971 to 1973 and at Gardner–Webb University in 1978, compiling a career coaching record of 20–14–1.

== Coaching career ==
In 1970, Kinard's older brother, a former Ole Miss and NFL star, Frank "Bruiser" Kinard, became the athletic director at Ole Miss. He hired the younger Kinard to be the new Ole Miss Rebels football coach. One of main reasons that Billy Kinard was brought in by his brother, after Vaughts "heart attack", was to integrate the football team. Johnny Vaught had been adamant that he would not integrate. After the third contest of the 1973 season, Johnny Vaught replaced Kinard, returning for his second stint as Ole Miss' athletic director and head football coach. Now, Johnny Vaught could coach again and not be "responsible " for the integration of the football team.

== Head coaching record ==
Year	Team	Overall	Conference	Standing	Bowl/playoffs	Coaches^{#}	AP^{°}
Ole Miss Rebels (Southeastern Conference) (1971–1973)
1971	Ole Miss	10–2	4–2	T–4th	W Peach	20	15
1972	Ole Miss	5–5	2–5	T–7th			
1973	Ole Miss	1–2 (Note: Kinard was fired after the first three games of the 1973 season, before the start of conference play. Johnny Vaught replaced Kinard as head coach and led Ole Miss to a record of 5–3 over the final eight games of the season. The Rebels finished 6–5 overall and 4–3 in Southeastern Conference play, placing third.)	0–0				
Ole Miss:		16–9	6–7				
Gardner–Webb Runnin' Bulldogs (South Atlantic Conference) (1978)
1978	Gardner–Webb	4–5–1	2–5	T–5th			
Gardner–Webb:		4–5–1	2–5				
Total:		20–14–1					
^{#}Rankings from final Coaches Poll.; ^{°}Rankings from final AP Poll.

== See also ==
- List of American Football League players
