= 1972 Georgia Bulldogs football team =

American college football season

1972 Georgia Bulldogs football
- Conference: Southeastern Conference
- Record: 7–4 (4–3 SEC)
- Head coach: Vince Dooley (9th season)
- Defensive coordinator: Erk Russell (9th season)
- Home stadium: Sanford Stadium

1972 Southeastern Conference football standings
| | Conf. | | | | | Overall |
| Team | W | | L | | T | W | | L | | T |
|---|---|---|---|---|---|---|---|---|---|---|
| No. 7 Alabama $ | 7 | – | 1 | – | 0 | 10 | – | 2 | – | 0 |
| No. 5 Auburn | 6 | – | 1 | – | 0 | 10 | – | 1 | – | 0 |
| No. 11 LSU | 4 | – | 1 | – | 1 | 9 | – | 2 | – | 1 |
| No. 8 Tennessee | 4 | – | 2 | – | 0 | 10 | – | 2 | – | 0 |
| Georgia | 4 | – | 3 | – | 0 | 7 | – | 4 | – | 0 |
| Florida | 3 | – | 3 | – | 1 | 5 | – | 5 | – | 1 |
| Ole Miss | 2 | – | 5 | – | 0 | 5 | – | 5 | – | 0 |
| Kentucky | 2 | – | 5 | – | 0 | 3 | – | 8 | – | 0 |
| Mississippi State | 1 | – | 6 | – | 0 | 4 | – | 7 | – | 0 |
| Vanderbilt | 0 | – | 6 | – | 0 | 3 | – | 8 | – | 0 |
$ – Conference champion; Rankings from AP Poll

The 1972 Georgia Bulldogs football team represented the University of Georgia as a member of the Southeastern Conference (SEC) during the 1972 NCAA University Division football season. Led by ninth-year head coach Vince Dooley, the Bulldogs compiled an overall record of 7–4, with a mark of 4–3 in conference play, and finished fifth in the SEC.

== Schedule ==
| Date | Opponent | Rank | Site | TV | Result | Attendance | Source |
|---|---|---|---|---|---|---|---|
| September 16 | Baylor* | No. 16 | Sanford Stadium; Athens, GA | | W 24–14 | 53,201 | |
| September 23 | at Tulane* | No. 16 | Tulane Stadium; New Orleans, LA | ABC | L 13–24 | 43,084 | |
| September 30 | NC State* | | Sanford Stadium; Athens, GA | | W 28–22 | 56,613 | |
| October 7 | No. 4 Alabama | | Sanford Stadium; Athens, GA (rivalry) | | L 7–25 | 60,013 | |
| October 14 | at Ole Miss | | Mississippi Veterans Memorial Stadium; Jackson, MS | | W 14–13 | 42,800 | |
| October 21 | Vanderbilt^{†} | | Sanford Stadium; Athens, GA (rivalry) | | W 28–3 | 58,141 | |
| October 28 | at Kentucky | | McLean Stadium; Lexington, KY | | W 13–7 | 37,500 | |
| November 4 | No. 13 Tennessee | | Sanford Stadium; Athens, GA (rivalry) | | L 0–14 | 60,086 | |
| November 11 | vs. Florida | | Gator Bowl Stadium; Jacksonville, FL (rivalry) | ABC | W 10–7 | 66,252 | |
| November 18 | at No. 11 Auburn | | Cliff Hare Stadium; Auburn, AL (rivalry) | ABC | L 10–27 | 61,348 | |
| December 2 | Georgia Tech* | | Sanford Stadium; Athens, GA (rivalry) | | W 27–7 | 60,241 | |
*Non-conference game; ^{†}Homecoming; Rankings from AP Poll released prior to the game

== Preseason ==
Georgia was picked to finish fifth in the SEC.

Andy Johnson (QB), Jimmy Poulos (RB) represented the Georgia Bulldogs in the pre-season All-SEC team.

== Game summaries ==
=== At Ole Miss ===
Georgia Bulldogs at Ole Miss Rebels

| Quarter | 1 | 2 | 3 | 4 | Total |
|---|---|---|---|---|---|
| Georgia | 0 | 7 | 0 | 7 | 14 |
| Ole Miss | 7 | 6 | 0 | 0 | 13 |

at Mississippi Veterans Memorial Stadium, Jackson, Mississippi

- Date: October 14, 1972
- Game attendance: 42,800

Game information
First quarter
- MISS – Veazey 7-yard pass from Weese (Lavinghouse kick). Ole Miss 7–0.

Second quarter

- MISS – Malouf 47-yard pass from Weese (kick failed). Ole Miss 13–0.
- UGA – Bissell 74-yard pass from Ray (Braswell kick). Ole Miss 13–7.

Third quarter

- No scoring

Fourth quarter

- UGA – Johnson 1-yard run (Braswell kick). Georgia 14–13. Drive: 8 plays, 35 yards.

== Roster ==
1972 Georgia Bulldogs football team roster
Players
Coaches
Offense

| Pos. | # | Name | Class |
|---|---|---|---|
| QB | 14 | Andy Johnson | Jr |
| RB | 20 | Jimmy Poulos |

Defense

| Pos. | # | Name | Class |

Special teams

| Pos. | # | Name | Class |

Head coach

- Vince Dooley

Coordinators/assistant coaches

Legend

- (C) Team captain
- (S) Suspended
- (I) Ineligible
- Injured
- Redshirt
