= 1972 Ole Miss Rebels football team =

American college football season

1972 Ole Miss Rebels football
- Conference: Southeastern Conference
- Record: 5–5 (2–5 SEC)
- Head coach: Billy Kinard (2nd season)
- Home stadium: Hemingway Stadium; Mississippi Veterans Memorial Stadium

1972 Southeastern Conference football standings
	Conf.					Overall
Team	W		L		T	W		L		T
No. 7 Alabama $	7	–	1	–	0	10	–	2	–	0
No. 5 Auburn	6	–	1	–	0	10	–	1	–	0
No. 11 LSU	4	–	1	–	1	9	–	2	–	1
No. 8 Tennessee	4	–	2	–	0	10	–	2	–	0
Georgia	4	–	3	–	0	7	–	4	–	0
Florida	3	–	3	–	1	5	–	5	–	1
Ole Miss	2	–	5	–	0	5	–	5	–	0
Kentucky	2	–	5	–	0	3	–	8	–	0
Mississippi State	1	–	6	–	0	4	–	7	–	0
Vanderbilt	0	–	6	–	0	3	–	8	–	0
$ – Conference champion; Rankings from AP Poll

The 1972 Ole Miss Rebels football team represented the University of Mississippi during the 1972 NCAA University Division football season. The Rebels were led by second-year head coach Billy Kinard and played their home games at Hemingway Stadium in Oxford, Mississippi and Mississippi Veterans Memorial Stadium in Jackson. They competed as members of the Southeastern Conference, finishing tied for seventh with a record of 5–5 (2–5 SEC).

Ole Miss fielded its first integrated varsity football team in 1972, as did SEC rivals Georgia and LSU, plus Brigham Young.This was ten years after James Meredith became the first African-American to attend the university.

This was the first of 11 consecutive seasons in which the Rebels did not play in a bowl. The 1972 Rebels were also the last SEC team to play only 10 games.

== Schedule ==
Date	Opponent	Rank	Site	Result	Attendance	Source
September 16	at Memphis State*	No. 19	Memphis Memorial Stadium; Memphis, TN (rivalry)	W 34–29	51,174	
September 23	at South Carolina*	No. 20	Carolina Stadium; Columbia, SC	W 21–0	48,405	
September 30	Southern Miss*	No. 17	Hemingway Stadium; Oxford, MS	W 13–9	27,200	
October 7	No. 17 Auburn	No. 18	Mississippi Veterans Memorial Stadium; Jackson, MS (rivalry)	L 13–19	46,421	
October 14	Georgia		Mississippi Memorial Stadium; Jackson, MS	L 13–14	42,800	
October 21	Florida^{†}		Hemingway Stadium; Oxford, MS	L 0–16	35,250	
October 28	at Vanderbilt		Dudley Field; Nashville, TN (rivalry)	W 31–7	21,975	
November 4	at No. 6 LSU		Tiger Stadium; Baton Rouge, LA (rivalry)	L 16–17	70,502	
November 18	at No. 13 Tennessee		Neyland Stadium; Knoxville, TN (rivalry)	L 0–17	70,527	
November 25	Mississippi State		Hemingway Stadium; Oxford, MS (Egg Bowl)	W 51–14	33,586	
*Non-conference game; ^{†}Homecoming; Rankings from AP Poll released prior to the game

== Roster ==
1972 Ole Miss Rebels football team roster
Players
Coaches
Offense

Pos.	#	Name	Class
RB		Greg Ainsworth
RB		Gene Allen
WR		Bill Barry
OL		Pete Boone
OL		Art Bressler
OL		John Gregory
WR		Gary Hall
RB		Doug Hamley
RB		Paul Hofer
WR		Bill Jordan
RB		Larry Kramer
OL		Don Leathers
QB		Bill Malouf
OL		Danny Mikul
TE		Larry Northam
RB		Jimmy Porter
TE		Butch Veazey
QB	16	Norris Weese	Jr
RB		Jim Winstead
OL		Darrell Cleghorn	Fr

Defense

Pos.	#	Name	Class
LB		Bob Bailess
DL		Reggie Dill
DB		Mickey Fratesi
DB		Harry Harrison
DL		Bill May
DL		Mackey McKinzie
DB		Stan Moley
LB		Mel Richardson
LB		Stump Russell
DL		Jim Stuart
DB		Henry Walsh

Special teams

Pos.	#	Name	Class
K		Steve Lavinghouze

Head coach

- Billy Kinard

Coordinators/assistant coaches

Legend

- (C) Team captain
- (S) Suspended
- (I) Ineligible
- Injured
- Redshirt
