= 1972 NCAA University Division football season =

American college football season

- Preseason AP No. 1: Nebraska
- Regular season: September 9 – December 2, 1972
- Number of bowls: 11
- Bowl games: December 18, 1972 – January 1, 1973
- Champion(s): USC (AP, Coaches, FWAA, NFF)
- Heisman: Nebraska wide receiver Johnny Rodgers

The 1972 NCAA University Division football season saw the USC Trojans, coached by John McKay, go undefeated and win the national championship as the unanimous choice of the 50 AP panelists. Eighth-ranked in the preseason, the Trojans were narrowly voted No. 1 in the first AP poll, and stayed out front for the rest of the year.

Prior to the 1972 season, two programs were elevated to the University Division. The new programs were Long Beach State and Tampa. The change brought the total number of programs in the University Division to 121.

During the 20th century, the NCAA had no playoff for the major college football teams in the University Division, which became Division I in 1973 (and Division I-A in 1978). The NCAA Football Guide, however, did note an "unofficial national champion" based on the top ranked teams in the "wire service" (AP and UPI) polls. The "writers' poll" by Associated Press (AP) was the most popular, followed by the "coaches' poll" by United Press International) (UPI). Through the 1973 season, the UPI issued its final poll in early December before the bowls, but since 1968 (and 1965) the AP Trophy was withheld until the postseason was completed. The AP poll in 1972 consisted of the votes of fifty sportswriters, though not all of them voted in every poll. Those who cast votes would give their opinion of the ten best teams. Under a point system of twenty points for first place, nineteen for second, etc., the "overall" ranking was determined.

This season was historically significant because it was the first in which freshmen were eligible to play varsity football in the University Division. The NCAA had historically prohibited freshmen from varsity competition, except during the United States involvement in World War II and the Korean War. In 1968, the NCAA allowed freshman eligibility in the University Division in all sports, except football and basketball, and extended the rule to those sports effective with the 1972–73 academic year.

== Rule changes ==
- Kickoffs that land in the end zone untouched by the receivers are blown dead and the ball put in play by the receiving team at their own 20-yard line (touchback).
- Official time-outs are called for players who are "obviously injured." Previously, teams were charged a time-out for an injured player.
- Fouls committed by the team not in possession of the ball behind the dead-ball spot are enforced from the dead-ball spot.
- Jerseys must be replaced if the numbers are no longer readable. (Tear-aways were popular for backs & receivers, later prohibited)
- Mouthpieces are made mandatory starting with the 1973 season.

== Conference and program changes ==
=== NCAA structure ===
This was the last season for the "University" and "College" divisions. For the 1973 season, the NCAA created the three-division structure that exists today with teams and conferences designated accordingly:

- The University Division became Division I
- The College Division was subdivided into Division II and Division III

Five years later in 1978, Division I was subdivided (for football only) into I-A and I-AA. In 2006, these were renamed Division I FBS and FCS, respectively. Many of the teams and conferences now in FCS (Big Sky, Ohio Valley, SWAC, Yankee) were initially in Division II and moved up to I-AA.

=== Membership changes ===
School	1971 Conference	1972 Conference
Appalachian State Mountaineers	Independent	Southern
McNeese State Cowboys	Independent	Southland
New Mexico State Aggies	Independent	Missouri Valley
Trinity (TX) Tigers	Southland	Independent

=== Program changes ===
- Stanford University officially changed their nickname from Indians to Cardinals in 1972; it became the singular Cardinal in 1982.
- The Gulf South Conference, now in Division II, began football play in 1972.

== September ==
- In the preseason poll released on September 4, two-time defending national champion Nebraska Cornhuskers was ranked first, followed by their Big 8 conference rival, Colorado. Next was Ohio State, Arkansas, and Penn State.
- On September 9, No. 1 Nebraska lost 20–17 on a late field goal to unranked UCLA at night in Los Angeles and dropped to tenth place. No. 2 Colorado beat California 20–10. No. 3 Ohio State was idle, and No. 4 Arkansas lost 31–10 to No. 8 USC in Little Rock. No. 5 Penn State had not begun its season but fell to sixth. No. 7 Alabama beat Duke 35–12 in Birmingham and reached the top five, as did No. 6 Oklahoma, which had not yet played a game but moved up two slots. In the next poll, USC received 13 first place votes, and Colorado and Oklahoma had 12 apiece, but USC had a narrow lead in points, 779 to Colorado's 769. The poll was led by No. 1 USC, No. 2 Colorado, No. 3 Ohio State, No. 4 Oklahoma, and No. 5 Alabama.
- September 16: No. 1 USC trounced Oregon State 51–6, and No. 2 Colorado was idle. No. 3 Ohio State blanked Iowa 21–0, and No. 4 Oklahoma shut out Utah State 49–0. No. 5 Alabama was idle, and No. 7 Tennessee took its place in the next poll following a 28−21 victory over No. 6 Penn State. The poll featured No. 1 USC, No. 2 Oklahoma, No. 3 Colorado, No. 4 Ohio State, and No. 5 Tennessee.
- September 23: No. 1 USC won 55–20 at Illinois, and No. 2 Oklahoma crushed Oregon 68–3. No. 3 Colorado won 38–6 at Minnesota, No. 4 Ohio State was idle, and No. 5 Tennessee beat Wake Forest 45–6. The next poll featured No. 1 USC, No. 2 Oklahoma, No. 3 Colorado, No. 4 Tennessee, and No. 5 Ohio State.
- September 30: No. 1 USC played another Big Ten opponent, beating Michigan State 51–6 at the Coliseum in Los Angeles. No. 2 Oklahoma beat Clemson 52–3, having outscored its first three opponents 169–6. No. 3 Colorado lost 31–6 at Oklahoma State, and No. 4 Tennessee lost 10–6 to Auburn in Birmingham. No. 5 Ohio State beat North Carolina 29–14. No. 6 Alabama beat Vanderbilt 48–21, and No. 8 Michigan defeated Tulane 41–7. The next poll featured No. 1 USC, No. 2 Oklahoma, No. 3 Ohio State, No. 4 Alabama, and No. 5 Michigan.

== October ==
- October 7: No. 1 USC won 30–21 at No. 15 Stanford; the nine-point margin of victory would turn out to be the closest of their season. No. 2 Oklahoma was idle, and No. 3 Ohio State won 35–18 at California. No. 4 Alabama won 25–7 at Georgia and No. 5 Michigan beat Navy 35–7. The next poll featured No. 1 USC, No. 2 Oklahoma, No. 3 Alabama, No. 4 Ohio State, and No. 5 Michigan.
- October 14: No. 1 USC went back to winning big, 42–14 over California. No. 2 Oklahoma shut out their rival, No. 10 Texas, 27–0 at Dallas. No. 3 Alabama beat Florida 24–7. No. 4 Ohio State beat Illinois 25–7, and No. 5 Michigan blanked Michigan State 10–0, but dropped to sixth in the next poll. No. 6 Nebraska, which rolled over Missouri 62–0, moved up a spot. The top four remained the same.
- October 21: No. 1 USC beat No. 18 Washington 34–7, but No. 2 Oklahoma yielded its first touchdown of the season at No. 9 Colorado, and eventually fell 20–14. No. 3 Alabama won at No. 10 Tennessee 17–10, No. 4 Ohio State won at Wisconsin 28–20, and No. 5 Nebraska won 56–0 at Kansas. No. 6 Michigan won 31–7 at Illinois and returned to the top five. The next poll featured No. 1 USC, No. 2 Alabama, No. 3 Nebraska, No. 4 Ohio State, and No. 5 Michigan.
- October 28: No. 1 USC won 18–0 at Oregon, its only shutout in a perfect season. No. 2 Alabama beat Southern Mississippi 48–11 in Birmingham, and No. 3 Nebraska registered its fourth consecutive shutout, 34–0 at Oklahoma State. The Cornhuskers had outscored their opponents 271–14 after their opening loss, most notably including a 77–7 win at Army. No. 4 Ohio State handled Indiana 44–7, and No. 5 Michigan beat Minnesota 27–19. The next poll featured No. 1 USC, No. 2 Alabama, No. 3 Nebraska, No. 4 Michigan, and No. 5 Ohio State.

== November ==
- November 4: No. 1 USC beat Washington State 44–3 in Seattle, and No. 2 Alabama defeated Mississippi State 58–14. No. 3 Nebraska won 33–10 at No. 15 Colorado, No. 4 Michigan won 21–7 at Indiana, and No. 5 Ohio State beat Minnesota 27–19. The top five remained the same.
- November 11: No. 1 USC had the week off. In a matchup of undefeated teams, No. 2 Alabama beat No. 6 LSU 35–21 at Birmingham. No. 3 Nebraska visited Iowa State and played to a 23–23 tie. No. 4 Michigan won 31–0 at Iowa to extend its record to 9–0. No. 5 Ohio State lost 19–12 at Michigan State, and No. 7 Oklahoma beat No. 14 Missouri 17–6 to return to the top five. The next poll featured No. 1 USC, No. 2 Alabama, No. 3 Michigan, No. 4 Oklahoma, and No. 5 Nebraska.
- November 18: No. 1 USC beat No. 14 UCLA, 24–7, and No. 2 Alabama beat Virginia Tech 52–13. No. 3 Michigan got past Purdue 9–6, No. 4 Oklahoma won 31–7 at Kansas, and No. 5 Nebraska beat Kansas State 59–7. The top five remained the same.
- November 25: No. 1 USC and No. 2 Alabama were idle, while No. 3 Michigan (10–0) and No. 9 Ohio State (9–1) met at Columbus to determine the Big Ten title and USC's Rose Bowl opponent. In the fourth installment of "The Ten Year War," Ohio State won 14–11. No. 4 Oklahoma returned the favor of last year's Game of the Century by beating No. 5 Nebraska 17–14 on the road in Lincoln. No. 6 Penn State beat visiting Pittsburgh 49–27 to close its regular season at 10–1. The next poll featured No. 1 USC, No. 2 Alabama, No. 3 Oklahoma, No. 4 Ohio State, and No. 5 Penn State.
- December 2: No. 1 USC closed its regular season at home with a 45–23 win over No. 10 Notre Dame to finish at 11–0. No. 2 Alabama (10–0), which had already clinched the SEC championship, hoped to do the same as it met No. 9 Auburn (8–1) in their annual Iron Bowl rivalry game in Birmingham. Auburn spoiled perfection, beating Alabama 17–16. No. 3 Oklahoma closed its regular season with a 10–1 record and the Big 8 title after a 38–15 win over No. 20 Oklahoma State. No. 4 Ohio State and No. 5 Penn State had both finished their regular seasons. The final regular season poll featured No. 1 USC, No. 2 Oklahoma, No. 3 Ohio State, No. 4 Alabama, and No. 5 Penn State.

In 1972, only the Rose Bowl (Big Ten vs. Pac-8) and Cotton Bowl (SWC winner) had rigid conference tie-ins. Thus, Big 8 champion Oklahoma passed up an Orange Bowl invitation to play in the Sugar Bowl against Penn State, while SEC champion Alabama turned down the Sugar to meet No. 7 Texas (which had breezed to the SWC title after its early-season loss to Oklahoma) in the Cotton. For the first time, the Sugar Bowl was played at night on New Year's Eve, rather than New Year's Day afternoon. With two consecutive victories in the Orange Bowl, No. 9 Nebraska was invited to a third against No. 12 Notre Dame.

== Conference standings ==
1972 Atlantic Coast Conference football standings
	Conf.					Overall
Team	W		L		T	W		L		T
No. 12 North Carolina $	6	–	0	–	0	11	–	1	–	0
No. 17 NC State	4	–	1	–	1	8	–	3	–	1
Maryland	3	–	2	–	1	5	–	5	–	1
Duke	3	–	3	–	0	5	–	6	–	0
Clemson	2	–	4	–	0	4	–	7	–	0
Virginia	1	–	5	–	0	4	–	7	–	0
Wake Forest	1	–	5	–	0	2	–	9	–	0
$ – Conference champion; Rankings from AP Poll

1972 Big Eight Conference football standings
	Conf.					Overall
Team	W		L		T	W		L		T
No. 2 Oklahoma $	6	–	1	–	0	11	–	1	–	0
No. 4 Nebraska $	5	–	1	–	1	9	–	2	–	1
No. 16 Colorado	4	–	3	–	0	8	–	4	–	0
Oklahoma State	4	–	3	–	0	6	–	5	–	0
Missouri	3	–	4	–	0	6	–	6	–	0
Iowa State	2	–	4	–	1	5	–	6	–	1
Kansas	2	–	5	–	0	4	–	7	–	0
Kansas State	1	–	6	–	0	3	–	8	–	0
$ – Conference champion; The Big 8 Conference mandated Oklahoma forfeits in three conference games, giving Nebraska the title. Oklahoma reverted this record at a later date; hence, both Oklahoma and Nebraska claim this title.; Rankings from AP Poll

1972 Big Sky Conference football standings
	Conf.					Overall
Team	W		L		T	W		L		T
Montana State $	5	–	1	–	0	8	–	3	–	0
Idaho State	4	–	1	–	0	7	–	3	–	0
Boise State	3	–	3	–	0	7	–	4	–	0
Montana	3	–	3	–	0	3	–	8	–	0
Idaho	2	–	3	–	0	4	–	7	–	0
Weber State	2	–	4	–	0	5	–	5	–	0
Northern Arizona	0	–	4	–	0	3	–	8	–	0
$ – Conference champion

1972 Big Ten Conference football standings
	Conf.					Overall
Team	W		L		T	W		L		T
No. 6 Michigan +	7	–	1	–	0	10	–	1	–	0
No. 9 Ohio State +	7	–	1	–	0	9	–	2	–	0
Purdue	6	–	2	–	0	6	–	5	–	0
Michigan State	5	–	2	–	1	5	–	5	–	1
Minnesota	4	–	4	–	0	4	–	7	–	0
Indiana	3	–	5	–	0	5	–	6	–	0
Illinois	3	–	5	–	0	3	–	8	–	0
Iowa	2	–	6	–	1	3	–	7	–	1
Wisconsin	2	–	6	–	0	4	–	7	–	0
Northwestern	1	–	8	–	0	2	–	9	–	0
+ – Conference co-champions; Rankings from AP Poll

1972 Ivy League football standings
	Conf.					Overall
Team	W		L		T	W		L		T
Dartmouth $	5	–	1	–	1	7	–	1	–	1
Yale	5	–	2	–	0	7	–	2	–	0
Penn	4	–	3	–	0	6	–	3	–	0
Cornell	4	–	3	–	0	6	–	3	–	0
Harvard	3	–	3	–	1	4	–	4	–	1
Princeton	2	–	4	–	1	3	–	5	–	1
Columbia	2	–	4	–	1	3	–	5	–	1
Brown	1	–	6	–	0	1	–	8	–	0
$ – Conference champion

1972 Mid-American Conference football standings
	Conf.					Overall
Team	W		L		T	W		L		T
Kent State $	4	–	1	–	0	6	–	5	–	1
Bowling Green	3	–	1	–	1	6	–	3	–	1
Western Michigan	2	–	2	–	1	7	–	3	–	1
Miami (OH)	2	–	3	–	0	7	–	3	–	0
Toledo	2	–	3	–	0	6	–	5	–	0
Ohio	1	–	4	–	0	3	–	8	–	0
$ – Conference champion

1972 Missouri Valley Conference football standings
	Conf.					Overall
Team	W		L		T	W		L		T
No. 18 Louisville +	4	–	1	–	0	9	–	1	–	0
Drake +	4	–	1	–	0	7	–	5	–	0
West Texas State +	4	–	1	–	0	5	–	5	–	0
Memphis State	3	–	2	–	0	5	–	5	–	1
Tulsa	3	–	2	–	0	4	–	7	–	0
Wichita State	2	–	4	–	0	6	–	5	–	0
New Mexico State	1	–	4	–	0	2	–	9	–	0
North Texas State	0	–	7	–	0	1	–	10	–	0
+ – Conference co-champions; West Texas State's game against Colorado State, Tulsa's game against TCU, and New Mexico State's game against New Mexico counted in the conference standings.; Rankings from AP Poll

1972 Pacific Coast Athletic Association football standings
	Conf.					Overall
Team	W		L		T	W		L		T
San Diego State $	4	–	0	–	0	10	–	1	–	0
Pacific (CA)	3	–	1	–	0	8	–	3	–	0
Fresno State	1	–	3	–	0	6	–	4	–	1
Long Beach State	1	–	3	–	0	5	–	6	–	0
San Jose State	1	–	3	–	0	4	–	7	–	0
Cal State Los Angeles*	0	–	0	–	0	3	–	7	–	0
$ – Conference champion; * – Did not compete for conference title

1972 Pacific-8 Conference football standings
	Conf.					Overall
Team	W		L		T	W		L		T
No. 1 USC $	7	–	0	–	0	12	–	0	–	0
No. 15 UCLA	5	–	2	–	0	8	–	3	–	0
No. 19 Washington State	4	–	3	–	0	7	–	4	–	0
Washington	4	–	3	–	0	8	–	3	–	0
California	3	–	4	–	0	3	–	8	–	0
Oregon	2	–	5	–	0	5	–	6	–	0
Stanford	2	–	5	–	0	6	–	5	–	0
Oregon State	1	–	6	–	0	2	–	9	–	0
$ – Conference champion; Rankings from AP Poll

1972 Southern Conference football standings
	Conf.					Overall
Team	W		L		T	W		L		T
East Carolina $	6	–	0	–	0	9	–	2	–	0
Richmond	5	–	1	–	0	6	–	4	–	0
William & Mary	4	–	2	–	0	5	–	6	–	0
The Citadel	4	–	3	–	0	5	–	6	–	0
Davidson	2	–	3	–	1	3	–	7	–	1
VMI	1	–	5	–	0	2	–	9	–	0
Furman	1	–	6	–	0	2	–	9	–	0
Appalachian State	0	–	3	–	1	5	–	5	–	1
$ – Conference champion

1972 Southeastern Conference football standings
	Conf.					Overall
Team	W		L		T	W		L		T
No. 7 Alabama $	7	–	1	–	0	10	–	2	–	0
No. 5 Auburn	6	–	1	–	0	10	–	1	–	0
No. 11 LSU	4	–	1	–	1	9	–	2	–	1
No. 8 Tennessee	4	–	2	–	0	10	–	2	–	0
Georgia	4	–	3	–	0	7	–	4	–	0
Florida	3	–	3	–	1	5	–	5	–	1
Ole Miss	2	–	5	–	0	5	–	5	–	0
Kentucky	2	–	5	–	0	3	–	8	–	0
Mississippi State	1	–	6	–	0	4	–	7	–	0
Vanderbilt	0	–	6	–	0	3	–	8	–	0
$ – Conference champion; Rankings from AP Poll

1972 Southwest Conference football standings
	Conf.					Overall
Team	W		L		T	W		L		T
No. 3 Texas $	7	–	0	–	0	10	–	1	–	0
Texas Tech	4	–	3	–	0	8	–	4	–	0
SMU	4	–	3	–	0	7	–	4	–	0
Arkansas	3	–	4	–	0	6	–	5	–	0
Rice	3	–	4	–	0	5	–	5	–	1
Baylor	3	–	4	–	0	5	–	6	–	0
TCU	2	–	5	–	0	5	–	6	–	0
Texas A&M	2	–	5	–	0	3	–	8	–	0
$ – Conference champion; Rankings from AP Poll

1972 Western Athletic Conference football standings
	Conf.					Overall
Team	W		L		T	W		L		T
No. 13 Arizona State $	5	–	1	–	0	10	–	2	–	0
BYU	5	–	2	–	0	7	–	4	–	0
Utah	5	–	2	–	0	6	–	5	–	0
Arizona	4	–	3	–	0	4	–	7	–	0
Wyoming	3	–	4	–	0	4	–	7	–	0
New Mexico	2	–	4	–	0	3	–	8	–	0
Colorado State	1	–	4	–	0	1	–	10	–	0
UTEP	1	–	6	–	0	2	–	8	–	0
$ – Conference champion; Rankings from AP Poll

1972 NCAA University Division independents football records
	Conf.			Overall
Team	W	L	T	W		L		T
No. 10 Penn State		–		10	–	2	–	0
No. 14 Notre Dame		–		8	–	3	–	0
Utah State		–		8	–	3	–	0
West Virginia		–		8	–	4	–	0
Florida State		–		7	–	4	–	0
Northern Illinois		–		7	–	4	–	0
Rutgers		–		7	–	4	–	0
No. 20 Georgia Tech		–		7	–	4	–	1
Air Force		–		6	–	4	–	0
Army		–		6	–	4	–	0
Virginia Tech		–		6	–	4	–	1
Houston		–		6	–	4	–	1
Tulane		–		6	–	5	–	0
Temple		–		5	–	4	–	0
Colgate		–		5	–	4	–	1
Holy Cross		–		5	–	4	–	1
Syracuse		–		5	–	6	–	0
Miami (FL)		–		5	–	6	–	0
Dayton		–		4	–	6	–	1
Boston College		–		4	–	7	–	0
Navy		–		4	–	7	–	0
South Carolina		–		4	–	7	–	0
Southern Miss		–		3	–	7	–	1
Xavier		–		3	–	8	–	0
Marshall		–		2	–	8	–	0
Cincinnati		–		2	–	9	–	0
Villanova		–		2	–	9	–	0
Pittsburgh		–		1	–	10	–	0
Rankings from AP Poll

== Bowl games ==
=== Major bowls ===
Sunday, December 31, 1972
Monday, January 1, 1973

Bowl game	Winning team		Losing team	
Sugar	No. 2 Oklahoma	14	No. 5 Penn State	0
Cotton	No. 7 Texas	17	No. 4 Alabama	13
Rose	No. 1 USC	42	No. 3 Ohio State	17
Orange	No. 9 Nebraska	40	No. 12 Notre Dame	6

The final AP poll in January was: 1. USC (12–0), 2. Oklahoma (11–1), 3. Texas (10–1), 4. Nebraska (9–2–1), 5. Auburn (10–1)

=== Other bowls ===
Bowl	City	State	Date	Winner	Score	Loser
Sun	El Paso	Texas	December 30	No. 16 North Carolina	32–28	Texas Tech
Gator	Jacksonville	Florida	December 30	No. 6 Auburn	24–3	No. 13 Colorado
Tangerine	Orlando	Florida	December 29	Tampa	21–18	Kent State
Astro-Bluebonnet	Houston	Texas	December 30	No. 11 Tennessee	24–17	No. 10 LSU
Liberty	Memphis	Tennessee	December 18	Georgia Tech	31–30	Iowa State
Peach	Atlanta	Georgia	December 29	NC State	49–13	No. 18 West Virginia
Fiesta	Tempe	Arizona	December 23	No. 15 Arizona State	49–35	Missouri

- Prior to the 1975 season, the Big Ten and Pac-8 conferences allowed only one postseason participant each, for the Rose Bowl.

== Heisman Trophy voting ==
The Heisman Trophy is given to the year's most outstanding player. The Big Eight Conference dominated the Heisman race in 1972, as the top three were from Nebraska and Oklahoma:

Player	School	Position	1st	2nd	3rd	Total
Johnny Rodgers	Nebraska	WR	301	151	105	1,310
Greg Pruitt	Oklahoma	RB	117	223	169	966
Rich Glover	Nebraska	MG	99	125	105	652
Bert Jones	LSU	QB	61	61	46	351
Terry Davis	Alabama	QB	62	50	52	338
John Hufnagel	Penn State	QB	62	28	50	292
George Amundson	Iowa State	RB	41	31	34	219
Otis Armstrong	Purdue	RB	44	24	28	208
Don Strock	Virginia Tech	QB	12	33	42	144
Gary Huff	Florida State	QB	20	24	30	138

== See also ==
- 1972 NCAA University Division football rankings
- 1972 College Football All-America Team
