= 1972 Vanderbilt Commodores football team =

American college football season

1972 Vanderbilt Commodores football
- Conference: Southeastern Conference
- Record: 3–8 (0–6 SEC)
- Head coach: Bill Pace (6th season)
- Home stadium: Dudley Field

1972 Southeastern Conference football standings
	Conf.					Overall
Team	W		L		T	W		L		T
No. 7 Alabama $	7	–	1	–	0	10	–	2	–	0
No. 5 Auburn	6	–	1	–	0	10	–	1	–	0
No. 11 LSU	4	–	1	–	1	9	–	2	–	1
No. 8 Tennessee	4	–	2	–	0	10	–	2	–	0
Georgia	4	–	3	–	0	7	–	4	–	0
Florida	3	–	3	–	1	5	–	5	–	1
Ole Miss	2	–	5	–	0	5	–	5	–	0
Kentucky	2	–	5	–	0	3	–	8	–	0
Mississippi State	1	–	6	–	0	4	–	7	–	0
Vanderbilt	0	–	6	–	0	3	–	8	–	0
$ – Conference champion; Rankings from AP Poll

The 1972 Vanderbilt Commodores football team represented Vanderbilt University in the 1972 NCAA University Division football season. The Commodores were led by head coach Bill Pace in his sixth season and finished the season with a record of three wins and eight losses (3–8 overall, 0–6 in the SEC).

== Schedule ==
Date	Time	Opponent	Site	Result	Attendance	Source
September 9		Chattanooga*	Dudley Field; Nashville, TN	W 24–7	19,500	
September 23		Mississippi State	Dudley Field; Nashville, TN	L 6–10	21,374	
September 30		at No. 6 Alabama	Denny Stadium; Tuscaloosa, AL	L 21–48	56,179	
October 7		Virginia*	Dudley Field; Nashville, TN	W 10–7	17,903	
October 14		at William & Mary*	Cary Field; Williamsburg, VA	W 21–17	13,000	
October 21		at Georgia	Sanford Stadium; Athens, GA (rivalry)	L 3–28	58,141	
October 28		Ole Miss	Dudley Field; Nashville, TN (rivalry)	L 7–31	21,975	
November 11		at Kentucky	McLean Stadium; Lexington, KY (rivalry)	L 13–14	30,000	
November 18		Tulane*	Dudley Field; Nashville, TN	L 7–21	10,000	
November 25	7:03 p.m.	at Tampa*	Tampa Stadium; Tampa, FL	L 7–30	11,831	
December 2		No. 12 Tennessee	Dudley Field; Nashville, TN (rivalry)	L 10–30	34,000	
*Non-conference game; Rankings from AP Poll released prior to the game; All times are in Central time

== Roster ==
1972 1972 Vanderbilt Commodores football team roster
Players			Coaches
Offense: Pos. / # / Name / Class; RB / / Paul Brogdon / Fr	Defense: Pos. / # / Name / Class	Special teams: Pos. / # / Name / Class	Head coach Coordinators/assistant coaches {{{asst_coach}}} Legend: (C) Team captain; (S) Suspended; (I) Ineligible; Injured; Redshirt
