= 1972 LSU Tigers football team =

American college football season

1972 LSU Tigers football

Astro-Bluebonnet Bowl, L 17–24 vs. Tennessee
- Conference: Southeastern Conference

Ranking
- Coaches: No. 10
- AP: No. 11
- Record: 9–2–1 (4–1–1 SEC)
- Head coach: Charles McClendon (11th season)
- Home stadium: Tiger Stadium

1972 Southeastern Conference football standings
	Conf.					Overall
Team	W		L		T	W		L		T
No. 7 Alabama $	7	–	1	–	0	10	–	2	–	0
No. 5 Auburn	6	–	1	–	0	10	–	1	–	0
No. 11 LSU	4	–	1	–	1	9	–	2	–	1
No. 8 Tennessee	4	–	2	–	0	10	–	2	–	0
Georgia	4	–	3	–	0	7	–	4	–	0
Florida	3	–	3	–	1	5	–	5	–	1
Ole Miss	2	–	5	–	0	5	–	5	–	0
Kentucky	2	–	5	–	0	3	–	8	–	0
Mississippi State	1	–	6	–	0	4	–	7	–	0
Vanderbilt	0	–	6	–	0	3	–	8	–	0
$ – Conference champion; Rankings from AP Poll

The 1972 LSU Tigers football team represented Louisiana State University (LSU) as a member of the Southeastern Conference (SEC) during the 1972 NCAA University Division football season. Led by 11th-year head coach Charles McClendon, the Tigers compiled an overall record of 9–2–1, with a mark of 4–1–1 in conference play, and finished third in the SEC.

LSU and SEC rivals Georgia and Ole Miss became the last major universities to desegregate their varsity football squads this season.

The September 30 game against Wisconsin marked the first appearance of a Big Ten Conference team at Tiger Stadium. Only three other Big Ten teams have played at Baton Rouge since: Indiana in 1978, Ohio State in 1987 and UCLA in 2024 (Maryland, Nebraska and USC each played in Baton Rouge before joining the Big Ten.).

LSU introduced a new helmet logo, a tiger head above the letters "LSU" inside a purple circle, a logo which was used through 1976. Also, player names were placed on jerseys for the first time.

== Schedule ==
Date	Time	Opponent	Rank	Site	Result	Attendance	Source
September 16	7:30 p.m.	Pacific (CA)*	No. 9	Tiger Stadium; Baton Rouge, LA	W 31–13	66,574	
September 23		Texas A&M*	No. 8	Tiger Stadium; Baton Rouge, LA (rivalry)	W 42–17	68,538	
September 30		Wisconsin*	No. 9	Tiger Stadium; Baton Rouge, LA	W 27–7	69,142	
October 7		at Rice*	No. 8	Rice Stadium; Houston, TX	W 12–6	60,000	
October 14		No. 9 Auburn	No. 8	Tiger Stadium; Baton Rouge, LA (rivalry)	W 35–7	70,132	
October 21		Kentucky	No. 7	Tiger Stadium; Baton Rouge, LA	W 10–0	64,601	
November 4		Ole Miss^{†}	No. 6	Tiger Stadium; Baton Rouge, LA (rivalry)	W 17–16	70,502	
November 11		at No. 2 Alabama	No. 6	Legion Field; Birmingham, AL (rivalry)	L 21–35	72,039	
November 18		Mississippi State	No. 8	Tiger Stadium; Baton Rouge, LA (rivalry)	W 28–14	60,589	
November 25		at Florida	No. 8	Florida Field; Gainesville, FL (rivalry)	T 3–3	46,391	
December 2		at Tulane*	No. 11	Tulane Stadium; New Orleans, LA (Battle for the Rag)	W 9–3	85,372	
December 30		vs. No. 11 Tennessee	No. 10	Houston Astrodome; Houston, TX (Astro-Bluebonnet Bowl)	L 17–24	52,961	
*Non-conference game; ^{†}Homecoming; Rankings from AP Poll released prior to the game; All times are in Central time

== Rankings ==
Ranking movements Legend: ██ Increase in ranking ██ Decrease in ranking
	Week														
Poll	Pre	1	2	3	4	5	6	7	8	9	10	11	12	13	Final
AP	11	9	8	9	8	8	7	6	6	6	8	8	11	10	11
Coaches	11	8	9	9	7	8	7	6	7	6	7	9	12	10	Not released

== Game summaries ==
=== Auburn ===
#9 Auburn Tigers at #8 LSU Tigers

Quarter	1	2	3	4	Total
Auburn	0	7	0	0	7
LSU	14	7	7	7	35

at Tiger Stadium, Baton Rouge, Louisiana

- Date: October 14, 1972
- Game time: 7:30 p.m. CDT
- Game attendance: 70,132

Game information

First quarter

- LSU – Jones 7-yard run (Jackson kick). LSU 7–0. Drive: 67 yards.
- LSU – Keigley 19-yard pass from Jones (Jackson kick). LSU 14–0. Drive: 69 yards.

Second quarter

- AUB – Henley 1-yard run (Jett kick). LSU 14–7.
- LSU – Boyd 19-yard pass from Fakier (Jackson kick). LSU 21–7.

Third quarter

- LSU – Keigley 19-yard pass from Jones (Jackson kick). LSU 28–7.

Fourth quarter

- LSU – Keigley 27-yard pass from Jones (Jackson kick). LSU 35–7.

Top passers

- LSU – Bert Jones – 10/14, 183 yards, 3 TD

Top rushers

- LSU – Bert Jones – 8 rushes, 60 yards, TD

=== Ole Miss ===
Ole Miss Rebels at #6 LSU Tigers

Quarter	1	2	3	4	Total
Ole Miss	3	3	7	3	16
LSU	7	3	0	7	17

at Tiger Stadium, Baton Rouge, Louisiana

- Date: November 4, 1972
- Game attendance: 70,502
- Ocala Star-Banner, 1972 Nov 05.

Game information

First quarter

- MISS – Steve Lavinghouze 42-yard field goal. Ole Miss 3–0. Drive:
- LSU – Bert Jones 6-yard run (Rusty Jackson kick). LSU 7–3. Drive: 12 plays, 75 yards.

Second quarter

- LSU – Rusty Jackson 29-yard field goal. LSU 10–3. Drive:
- MISS – Steve Lavinghouze 38-yard field goal, 0:00. LSU 10–6. Drive:

Third quarter

- MISS – Norris Weese 1-yard run (Steve Ladinghouze kick). Ole Miss 13–10. Drive: 16 plays, 69 yards.

Fourth quarter

- MISS – Steve Lavinghouze 40-yard field goal. Ole Miss 16–10. Drive:
- LSU – Brad Davis 10-yard pass from Bert Jones (Rusty Jackson kick), 0:00. LSU 17–16. Drive: 13 plays, 80 yards, 3:02.

Top passers

- MISS
- LSU

Top rushers

- MISS
- LSU

Top receivers

- MISS
- LSU

Bert Jones set school career records for completions, touchdowns and total offense.

== Roster ==
1972 LSU Tigers football team roster
Players
Coaches
Offense

Pos.	#	Name	Class
RB		Ken Addy
RB		Jim Benglis
TE	89	Brad Boyd
SB	3	Al Coffee	Sr
OL		Loyd Daniel
RB		Chris Dantin
RB		Brad Davis
OL		Jimmy Elkins
WR		Joe Fakier
RB		Ben Jones
QB	7	Bert Jones	Sr
RB		Jim Kadi
WR		Gerald Keigley
OL		Logan Killen
WR	1	Jimmy LeDoux	Sr
QB	16	Paul Lyons
QB	5	Mike Miley
OL		Phil Murray
RB		Steve Rogers
OL		Randy Russell
OL		Steve Streete
TE		Chuck Williamson

Defense

Pos.	#	Name	Class
DE	99	Kenny Bordelon	Fr
DL		Tommy Butoud
DB		Dale Cangelosi
LB	55	Warren Capone	Jr
DL		Steve Cassidy
LB		Gary Champagne
DL		Skip Cormier
DB		Rand Dennis
DL		Jim Gainey
LB		Bo Harris
DB		Norm Hodgins
DT	64	Tyler Lafauci	Jr
DL	91	Binks Miciotto
S	17	Frank Racine	Jr
LB		Pepper Rutland
S	11	John Staggs	Jr
DB		Mike Williams
DB	38	Roland Skelton Jr
DE	79	John Wood	Sr

Special teams

Pos.	#	Name	Class
K	8	Rusty Jackson

Head coach

- Charles McClendon

Coordinators/assistant coaches

Legend

- (C) Team captain
- (S) Suspended
- (I) Ineligible
- Injured
- Redshirt

Roster

== Team players drafted into the NFL ==
Player	Position	Round	Pick	NFL team
Bert Jones	Quarterback	1	2	Baltimore Colts
John Wood	Defensive tackle	3	70	Denver Broncos
