= 1972 Tennessee Volunteers football team =

American college football season

1972 Tennessee Volunteers football

Astro-Bluebonnet Bowl champion

Astro-Bluebonnet Bowl, W 24–17 vs. LSU
- Conference: Southeastern Conference

Ranking
- Coaches: No. 11
- AP: No. 8
- Record: 10–2 (4–2 SEC)
- Head coach: Bill Battle (3rd season)
- Offensive coordinator: Jim Wright
- Captain: Jamie Rotella
- Home stadium: Neyland Stadium

1972 Southeastern Conference football standings
	Conf.					Overall
Team	W		L		T	W		L		T
No. 7 Alabama $	7	–	1	–	0	10	–	2	–	0
No. 5 Auburn	6	–	1	–	0	10	–	1	–	0
No. 11 LSU	4	–	1	–	1	9	–	2	–	1
No. 8 Tennessee	4	–	2	–	0	10	–	2	–	0
Georgia	4	–	3	–	0	7	–	4	–	0
Florida	3	–	3	–	1	5	–	5	–	1
Ole Miss	2	–	5	–	0	5	–	5	–	0
Kentucky	2	–	5	–	0	3	–	8	–	0
Mississippi State	1	–	6	–	0	4	–	7	–	0
Vanderbilt	0	–	6	–	0	3	–	8	–	0
$ – Conference champion; Rankings from AP Poll

The 1972 Tennessee Volunteers football team (variously "Tennessee", "UT" or the "Vols") represented the University of Tennessee in the 1972 NCAA University Division football season. Playing as a member of the Southeastern Conference (SEC), the team was led by head coach Bill Battle, in his third year, and played their home games at Neyland Stadium in Knoxville, Tennessee. They finished the season with a record of ten wins and two losses (10–2 overall, 4–2 in the SEC) and a victory over LSU in the 1972 Astro-Bluebonnet Bowl. The Volunteers offense scored 297 points while the defense allowed 100 points.

== Schedule ==
Date	Opponent	Rank	Site	TV	Result	Attendance	Source
September 9	at Georgia Tech*	No. 15	Grant Field; Atlanta, GA (rivalry)	ABC	W 34–3	52,112	
September 16	No. 6 Penn State*	No. 7	Neyland Stadium; Knoxville, TN		W 28–21	71,647	
September 23	Wake Forest*	No. 5	Neyland Stadium; Knoxville, TN		W 45–6	66,266	
September 30	at Auburn	No. 4	Legion Field; Birmingham, AL (rivalry)		L 6–10	69,483	
October 7	at Memphis State*	No. 10	Memphis Memorial Stadium; Memphis, TN		W 38–7	50,201	
October 21	No. 3 Alabama	No. 10	Neyland Stadium; Knoxville, TN (Third Saturday in October)		L 10–17	72,049	
October 28	Hawaii*	No. 14	Neyland Stadium; Knoxville, TN		W 34–2	63,903	
November 4	at Georgia	No. 13	Sanford Stadium; Athens, GA		W 14–0	60,086	
November 18	Ole Miss^{†}	No. 13	Neyland Stadium; Knoxville, TN (rivalry)		W 17–0	70,527	
November 25	Kentucky	No. 12	Neyland Stadium; Knoxville, TN (rivalry)		W 17–7	64,836	
December 2	at Vanderbilt	No. 12	Dudley Field; Nashville, TN (rivalry)		W 30–10	34,000	
December 30	vs. No. 10 LSU	No. 11	Houston Astrodome; Houston, TX (Astro-Bluebonnet Bowl)	Mizlou	W 24–17	52,961	
*Non-conference game; ^{†}Homecoming; Rankings from AP Poll released prior to the game

== Rankings ==
Ranking movements Legend: ██ Increase in ranking ██ Decrease in ranking т = Tied with team above or below ( ) = First-place votes
	Week														
Poll	Pre	1	2	3	4	5	6	7	8	9	10	11	12	13	Final
AP	15	7 (1)	5 (2)	4 (1)	10	11	10	14	13	13	13	12	12	11	8
Coaches	14	6	4	4	12	12	11	16	16 т	13	13	12	11	11	Not released

== Team players drafted into the NFL ==
Player	Position	Round	Pick	NFL club
Jamie Rotella	Linebacker	3	62	Baltimore Colts
Conrad Graham	Defensive back	8	187	Chicago Bears
Carl Johnson	Back	10	254	Dallas Cowboys
Richard Earl	Tackle	11	265	Buffalo Bills
