= 1972 Kentucky Wildcats football team =

American college football season

1972 Kentucky Wildcats football
- Conference: Southeastern Conference
- Record: 3–8 (2–5 SEC)
- Head coach: John Ray (4th season)
- Home stadium: McLean Stadium

1972 Southeastern Conference football standings
	Conf.					Overall
Team	W		L		T	W		L		T
No. 7 Alabama $	7	–	1	–	0	10	–	2	–	0
No. 5 Auburn	6	–	1	–	0	10	–	1	–	0
No. 11 LSU	4	–	1	–	1	9	–	2	–	1
No. 8 Tennessee	4	–	2	–	0	10	–	2	–	0
Georgia	4	–	3	–	0	7	–	4	–	0
Florida	3	–	3	–	1	5	–	5	–	1
Ole Miss	2	–	5	–	0	5	–	5	–	0
Kentucky	2	–	5	–	0	3	–	8	–	0
Mississippi State	1	–	6	–	0	4	–	7	–	0
Vanderbilt	0	–	6	–	0	3	–	8	–	0
$ – Conference champion; Rankings from AP Poll

The 1972 Kentucky Wildcats football team represented the University of Kentucky as a member of the Southeastern Conference (SEC) during the 1972 NCAA University Division football season. Led by fourth-year head coach John Ray, the Wildcats compiled an overall record of 3–8, with a mark of 2–5 in conference play, and finished tied for seventh in the SEC.

== Schedule ==
Date	Time	Opponent	Site	Result	Attendance	Source
September 16	1:32 p.m.	Villanova*	McLean Stadium; Lexington, KY	W 25–7	34,500	
September 23		at No. 7 Alabama	Legion Field; Birmingham, AL	L 0–35	71,433	
September 30		Indiana*	McLean Stadium; Lexington, KY (rivalry)	L 34–35	37,500	
October 7		Mississippi State	McLean Stadium; Lexington, KY	W 17–13	37,500	
October 14		at North Carolina*	Kenan Memorial Stadium; Chapel Hill, NC	L 20–31	42,500	
October 21		at No. 7 LSU	Tiger Stadium; Baton Rouge, LA	L 0–10	64,601	
October 28		Georgia	McLean Stadium; Lexington, KY	L 7–13	37,500	
November 4		at Tulane*	Tulane Stadium; New Orleans, LA	L 7–18	18,377	
November 11		Vanderbilt	McLean Stadium; Lexington, KY (rivalry)	W 14–13	30,000	
November 18		at Florida	Florida Field; Gainesville, FL (rivalry)	L 0–40	47,639	
November 25		at No. 12 Tennessee	Neyland Stadium; Knoxville, TN (rivalry)	L 7–17	64,836	
*Non-conference game; Rankings from AP Poll released prior to the game; All times are in Eastern time

== Roster ==
1972 Kentucky Wildcats football team roster
Players
Coaches
Offense

Pos.	#	Name	Class
C	52	Dan Neal	Sr
QB	14	Jim Reed	Sr

Defense

Pos.	#	Name	Class
LB	42	Frank LeMaster	Jr

Special teams

Pos.	#	Name	Class

Head coach

- John Ray

Coordinators/assistant coaches

Legend

- (C) Team captain
- (S) Suspended
- (I) Ineligible
- Injured
- Redshirt
