= Art Cantrelle =

American gridiron football player (born 1948)

Profile
- Position: Running back

Personal information
- Born: July 25, 1948 (age 78); Thibodaux, Louisiana, U.S.
- Listed height: 6 ft 0 in (1.83 m)
- Listed weight: 210 lb (95 kg)

Career history
- 1972–1973: Ottawa Rough Riders
- 1974–1975: Birmingham Americans/Birmingham Vulcans

Awards and highlights
- Grey Cup champion (1973); First-team All-SEC (1971); Second-team All-SEC (1970)

Arthur Cantrelle (born July 25, 1948) is a former Canadian Football League (CFL) player who played for the Ottawa Rough Riders. He also played in the World Football League (WFL) for the Birmingham Americans and Birmingham Vulcans in 1974-75. Cantrelle scored 10 rushing touchdowns during the 1975 season. He played college football at Louisiana State University.
