= Andy Hamilton (American football) =

American football player (born 1950)

No. 80, 83
- Position: Wide receiver

Personal information
- Born: April 8, 1950 (age 76); Ruston, Louisiana, U.S.
- Listed height: 6 ft 3 in (1.91 m)
- Listed weight: 190 lb (86 kg)

Career information
- High school: Ruston
- College: LSU (1968–1971)
- NFL draft: 1972: 4th round, 97th overall pick

Career history
- Kansas City Chiefs (1972–1975); New Orleans Saints (1975)

Awards and highlights
- First-team All-SEC (1971)

Career NFL statistics
- Receptions: 16
- Receiving yards: 270
- Stats at Pro Football Reference

Ladelle Andrews Hamilton Jr. (born April 8, 1950) is an American former professional football player who was a wide receiver for three seasons in the National Football League (NFL) with the Kansas City Chiefs and New Orleans Saints. He was selected by the Chiefs in the fourth round of the 1972 NFL draft after playing college football for the LSU Tigers.

== Early life ==
Hamilton played high school football at Ruston High School in Ruston, Louisiana. While at Ruston, he played receiver while his cousin, Bert Jones, played quarterback.

== College career ==
Hamilton played for the Tigers at Louisiana State University from 1968 to 1971. He played for LSU's freshman team in 1968. Hamilton also played with Bert Jones at LSU. He caught 109 passes for 2,141 yards and 18 touchdowns during his college career. He also rushed for 65 yards and 5 touchdowns. Hamilton set LSU career records for receptions, receiving yards, and receiving touchdowns. He tied an Orange Bowl record with 9 receptions in the 1971 Orange Bowl. He also tied an LSU record for touchdown catches in a game when he caught three in a victory against Notre Dame in 1971.

== Professional career ==
Hamilton was selected by the Kansas City Chiefs in the fourth round, with the 97th overall pick, of the 1972 NFL draft. He missed the entire 1972 season due to a shoulder injury. He made his NFL debut on November 4, 1973, against the San Diego Chargers. He had missed the earlier parts of the season due to injuries. He played in five games for the Chiefs in 1973, catching 2 passes for 35 yards. He played in 10 games in 1974, catching 2 passes for 25 yards. He was released by the Chiefs on September 16, 1975.

Hamilton played in 9 games for the New Orleans Saints during the 1975 season, catching 12 passes for 210 yards.

== Personal life ==
In 1970, Hamilton spoke at the Billy Graham Crusade in LSU's Tiger Stadium. He gave witness to his Christian faith, saying: "One thing gives me more satisfaction [than winning] and that's knowing Jesus Christ is in my heart." He was a member of the Fellowship of Christian Athletes.
