= 1971 All-SEC football team =

American college football all-star team

The 1971 All-SEC football team consists of American football players selected to the All-Southeastern Conference (SEC) chosen by various selectors for the 1971 NCAA University Division football season. Alabama won the conference.

== Offensive selections ==
=== Receivers ===
- Terry Beasley, Auburn (AP-1, UPI)
- Dick Schmaiz, Auburn (AP-2, UPI)
- Andy Hamilton, LSU (AP-1)
- Carlos Alvarez, Florida (AP-2)

=== Tight ends ===
- David Bailey, Alabama (AP-1)
- Jim Poole, Ole Miss (UPI)
- Eric Hoggatt, Ole Miss (AP-2)

=== Tackles ===
- Tom Nash, Georgia (AP-1, UPI)
- Jim Krapf, Alabama (AP-1)
- Danny Speigner, Auburn (AP-2)
- Fred Abbott, Florida (AP-2)

=== Guards ===
- Royce Smith, Georgia (AP-1, UPI)
- John Hannah, Alabama (AP-1, UPI)
- Mike Demarie, LSU (AP-2, UPI)
- Bill Emendorfer, Tennessee (AP-2)

=== Centers ===
- Jimmy Grammer, Alabama (AP-2, UPI)
- Kendall Keith, Georgia (AP-1)

=== Quarterbacks ===
- Pat Sullivan, Auburn (College Football Hall of Fame) (AP-1, UPI)
- John Reaves, Florida (AP-2)

=== Running backs ===
- Johnny Musso, Alabama (AP-1, UPI)
- Curt Watson, Tennessee (AP-2, UPI)
- Art Cantrelle, LSU (AP-1)
- Andy Johnson, Georgia (AP-2)

== Defensive selections ==
=== Ends ===
- Robin Parkhouse, Alabama (AP-1, UPI)
- Mixon Robinson, Georgia (AP-2, UPI)
- Bob Brown, Auburn (AP-1)
- George Abernethy, Vanderbilt (AP-2)

=== Tackles ===
- Ronnie Estay, LSU (AP-1, UPI)
- Tommy Yearout, Auburn (AP-2, UPI)
- Elmer Allen, Ole Miss (AP-1)
- Chuck Heard, Georgia (AP-2)

=== Linebackers ===
- Joe Federspiel, Kentucky (AP-1, UPI)
- Chip Wisdom, Georgia (AP-2, UPI)
- Jackie Walker, Tennessee (AP-2, UPI)
- Ray Nellies, Tennessee (AP-1)
- Tom Surlas, Alabama (AP-1)
- Jeff Rouzie, Alabama (AP-2)
- Paul Dongieux, Ole Miss (AP-2)

=== Backs ===
- Bobby Majors, Tennessee (AP-1, UPI)
- Steve Higginbotham, Alabama (AP-1, UPI)
- Buzy Rosenberg, Georgia (AP-1, UPI)
- Frank Dowsing, Miss. St. (AP-1)
- Tommy Casanova, LSU (College Football Hall of Fame) (UPI)
- Johnny Simmons, Auburn (AP-2)
- Conrad Graham, Tennessee (AP-2)
- Ken Stone, Vanderbilt (AP-2)

== Special teams ==
=== Kicker ===
- George Hunt, Tennessee (AP-1)
- Jay Michaelson, LSU (AP-2)

=== Punter ===
- David Beverly, Auburn (AP-1)
- Greg Gantt, Alabama (AP-2)

== Key ==
AP = Associated Press

UPI = United Press International

Bold = Consensus first-team selection by both AP and UPI

== See also ==
- 1971 College Football All-America Team
