= Elmer Allen =

American gridiron football player (born 1949)

Profile
- Position: Linebacker

Personal information
- Born: November 3, 1949 (age 77); Delhi, Louisiana, U.S.
- Listed height: 6 ft 2 in (1.88 m)
- Listed weight: 237 lb (108 kg)

Career information
- High school: Delhi HS
- College: Mississippi College
- NFL draft: 1972: 6th round, 136th overall pick

Career history
- 1972: Montreal Alouettes

Awards and highlights
- First-team All-SEC (1971)

Elmer Allen (born November 3, 1949) is an American former professional football linebacker who played one game for the Montreal Alouettes of the Canadian Football League (CFL) in 1972. He was selected by the Houston Oilers of the National Football League (NFL) in the sixth round of the 1972 NFL draft. Allen played college football at Mississippi College.
