= Condredge Holloway =

American gridiron football player (born 1954)

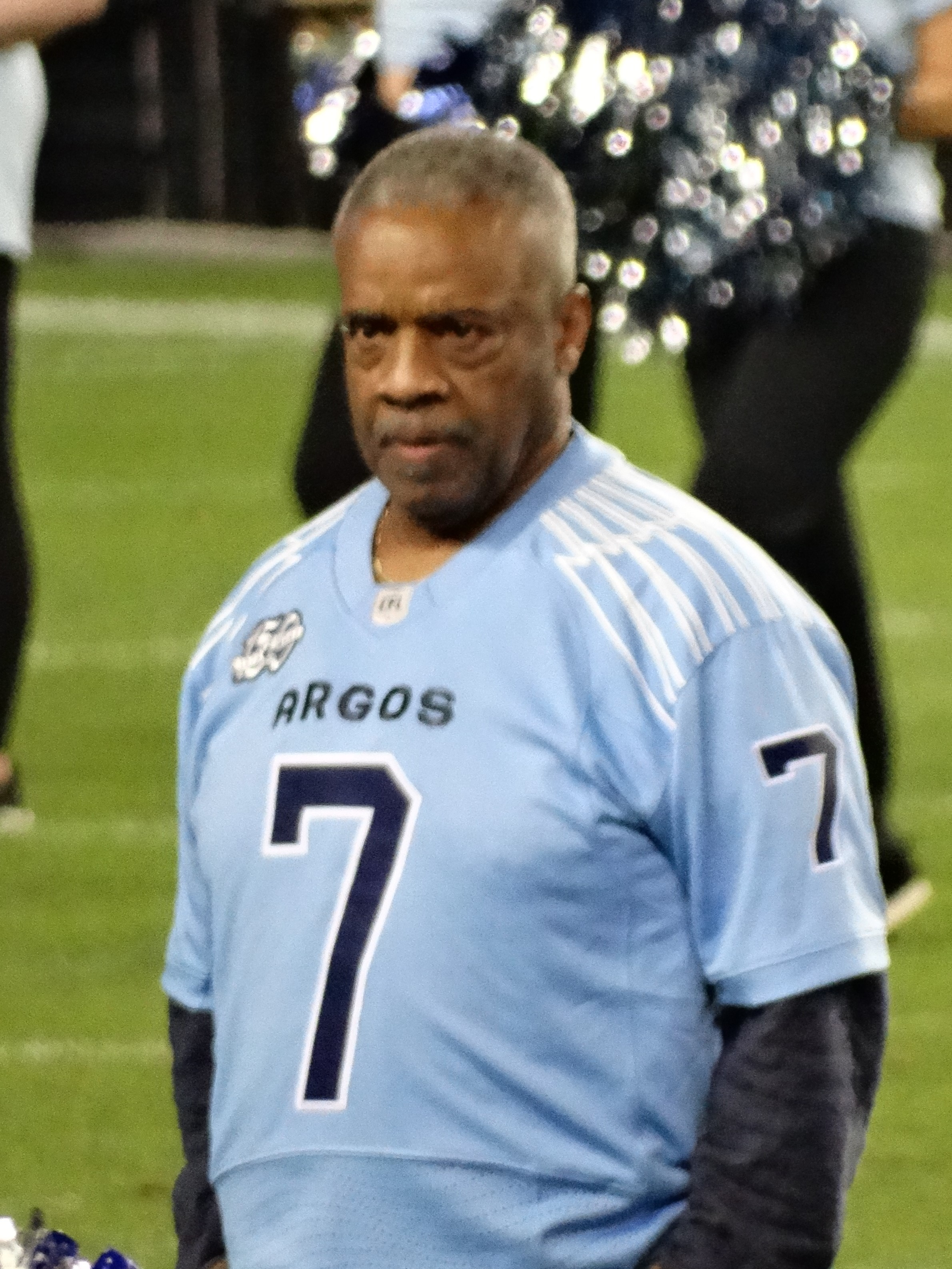
- Holloway in 2023

Profile
- Position: Quarterback

Personal information
- Born: January 24, 1954 (age 72); Huntsville, Alabama, U.S.

Career information
- High school: Lee (Huntsville)
- College: University of Tennessee
- NFL draft: 1975: 12th round, 306th overall pick

Career history
- 1975–1980: Ottawa Rough Riders
- 1981–1986: Toronto Argonauts
- 1987: BC Lions

Awards and highlights
- 2× Grey Cup champion (1976, 1983); Most Outstanding Player (1982); Jeff Russel Memorial Trophy (1982); CFL All-Star (1982); 3× CFL East All-Star (1978, 1982, 1983); First-team All-SEC (1973); Tennessee Sports Hall of Fame

Career CFL statistics
- Games played: 181
- Comp–Att: 1,710–3,013
- Completion %: 56.8
- Passing yards: 25,193
- TD–INT: 155–94
- Passer rating: 88.4
- Canadian Football Hall of Fame (Class of 1999)

Condredge Holloway Jr. (born January 25, 1954) is an American former quarterback for the University of Tennessee and later in the Canadian Football League (CFL). Holloway was one of the first African-American quarterbacks to receive national exposure. His nickname at Tennessee was the "Artful Dodger".

== Early life and college ==
Holloway was born to Condredge Holloway Sr., and Dorothy Holloway. Condredge's grandfather on his father's side was born a slave, but was emancipated as a child in 1865. Dorothy was hired to work at the Marshall Space Flight Center in Huntsville in 1962.

Holloway starred as a high school baseball player at Lee High School in Huntsville, where he was named to the ABCA High School All-America Baseball Team. He was selected as a shortstop by the Montreal Expos in the 1971 Major League Baseball draft. Holloway was Montreal's first pick, and he was the fourth player selected overall. However, Holloway's mother, insisting her son attend college, refused to sign the contract (Condredge was 17, too young to sign a contract under Alabama law) and instead he went to Tennessee. In so doing Holloway became the first African-American to start at the quarterback position in a Southeastern Conference school. In addition to being the first black quarterback at Tennessee and in the Southeastern Conference, Holloway also was the first black baseball player in Tennessee history. The outstanding prospect bypassed a baseball career, and Holloway opted instead for a two-sport collegiate career and went on to excel on the diamond. He garnered All-SEC and All-America honors as a shortstop in 1975 and finished with a .353 career batting average. Holloway — still the owner of Tennessee's longest hitting streak at 27 games — was selected to Tennessee's All-Century Baseball Team, making him the only Tennessee student-athlete named to all-century squads in both baseball and football.

In his three seasons (1972–74) as a starter, Holloway directed the Vols to the 1972 Astro-Bluebonnet, 1973 Gator, and 1974 Liberty Bowls and an overall record of 25–9–2. He ended his career with the best interception-to-attempt ratio in Tennessee history, throwing just 12 interceptions in 407 collegiate attempts. During his three seasons, he completed 238 of 407 passes for 3,102 yards and 18 touchdowns, and rushed 351 times for 966 yards and nine touchdowns.

== Canadian Football League ==
After leading the Volunteers to three bowl game appearances from 1972–74, Holloway was drafted by the NFL in 1975—but only in the twelfth round, as a defensive back, by the New England Patriots (few pro teams had African-American quarterbacks at that time). Instead, Holloway went to the Canadian Football League, playing for the Ottawa Rough Riders starting in 1975. Later, he moved to the Toronto Argonauts, capturing the CFL's Most Outstanding Player award in 1982 and guiding the Argos to a Grey Cup championship the following season—Toronto's first title in 31 years. Holloway finished his career with the BC Lions and was inducted into the Canadian Football Hall of Fame in 1999.

== After football ==
Currently, Holloway is the assistant athletic director at the University of Tennessee. Holloway is a co-owner of D1 Sports Training in Huntsville, Alabama.

In 1996, he was part of the SEC Football Legends, representing Tennessee.

In 2010, he was selected to the 1970s all-decade team of Madison County, Alabama, high school basketball players by The Huntsville Times.

On February 20, 2011, ESPN Films released The Color Orange: The Condredge Holloway Story. It was produced and narrated by country music star Kenny Chesney.
