= Terry Davis (American football) =

American football quarterback

No. 10 – Alabama Crimson Tide
- Position: Quarterback

Career information
- College: Alabama (1970–1972)

Awards and highlights
- SEC Player of the Year (1972); First-team All-SEC (1972)

Terry Davis is a former college football quarterback who played for the Alabama Crimson Tide from 1970 to 1972. He threw for 1,328 yards and 14 touchdowns. He is mostly known for running the football. He rushed for 865 yards and 16 touchdowns. He threw nine interceptions in his career. He finished fifth in the voting for the Heisman Trophy in 1972. He was the captain of the 1972 Alabama Crimson Tide football team.
