= 1972 Florida Gators football team =

American college football season

1972 Florida Gators football
- Conference: Southeastern Conference
- Record: 5–5–1 (3–3–1 SEC)
- Head coach: Doug Dickey (3rd season)
- Offensive coordinator: Jimmy Dunn (3rd season)
- Defensive coordinator: Doug Knotts (3rd season)
- Captain: Fred Abbott
- Home stadium: Florida Field

1972 Southeastern Conference football standings
| | Conf. | | | | | Overall |
| Team | W | | L | | T | W | | L | | T |
|---|---|---|---|---|---|---|---|---|---|---|
| No. 7 Alabama $ | 7 | – | 1 | – | 0 | 10 | – | 2 | – | 0 |
| No. 5 Auburn | 6 | – | 1 | – | 0 | 10 | – | 1 | – | 0 |
| No. 11 LSU | 4 | – | 1 | – | 1 | 9 | – | 2 | – | 1 |
| No. 8 Tennessee | 4 | – | 2 | – | 0 | 10 | – | 2 | – | 0 |
| Georgia | 4 | – | 3 | – | 0 | 7 | – | 4 | – | 0 |
| Florida | 3 | – | 3 | – | 1 | 5 | – | 5 | – | 1 |
| Ole Miss | 2 | – | 5 | – | 0 | 5 | – | 5 | – | 0 |
| Kentucky | 2 | – | 5 | – | 0 | 3 | – | 8 | – | 0 |
| Mississippi State | 1 | – | 6 | – | 0 | 4 | – | 7 | – | 0 |
| Vanderbilt | 0 | – | 6 | – | 0 | 3 | – | 8 | – | 0 |
$ – Conference champion; Rankings from AP Poll

The 1972 Florida Gators football team represented the University of Florida during the 1972 NCAA University Division football season. The season was the third for Doug Dickey as the head coach of the Florida Gators football team. Dickey's 1972 Florida Gators finished with a 5–5–1 overall record and a 3–3–1 Southeastern Conference (SEC) record, tying for sixth among ten SEC teams.

== Schedule ==
| Date | Opponent | Site | TV | Result | Attendance | Source |
|---|---|---|---|---|---|---|
| September 23 | vs. SMU* | Tampa Stadium; Tampa, FL | | L 14–21 | 42,489 | |
| September 30 | Mississippi State | Florida Field; Gainesville, FL | | W 28–13 | 42,712 | |
| October 7 | at No. 13 Florida State* | Doak Campbell Stadium; Tallahassee, FL (rivalry) | | W 42–13 | 42,758 | |
| October 14 | at No. 3 Alabama | Denny Stadium; Tuscaloosa, AL (rivalry) | | L 7–24 | 57,631 | |
| October 21 | at Ole Miss | Hemingway Stadium; Oxford, MS | | W 16–0 | 35,200 | |
| November 4 | No. 11 Auburn | Florida Field; Gainesville, FL (rivalry) | | L 20–26 | 57,551 | |
| November 11 | vs. Georgia | Gator Bowl Stadium; Jacksonville, FL (rivalry) | ABC | L 7–10 | 66,252 | |
| November 18 | Kentucky^{†} | Florida Field; Gainesville, FL (rivalry) | | W 40–0 | 47,639 | |
| November 25 | No. 8 LSU | Florida Field; Gainesville, FL (rivalry) | | T 3–3 | 46,391 | |
| December 2 | Miami (FL)* | Florida Field; Gainesville, FL (rivalry) | | W 17–6 | 46,432 | |
| December 9 | vs. No. 16 North Carolina* | Gator Bowl Stadium; Jacksonville, FL | | L 24–28 | 33,103 | |
*Non-conference game; ^{†}Homecoming; Rankings from AP Poll released prior to the game

== Game summaries ==
=== SMU ===
| | 1 | 2 | 3 | 4 | Total |
|---|---|---|---|---|---|
| SMU | 7 | 0 | 7 | 7 | 21 |
| Florida | 0 | 0 | 0 | 14 | 14 |

=== Mississippi State ===
| | 1 | 2 | 3 | 4 | Total |
|---|---|---|---|---|---|
| Mississippi St | 7 | 0 | 6 | 0 | 13 |
| Florida | 7 | 0 | 14 | 7 | 28 |

=== Florida State ===
| | 1 | 2 | 3 | 4 | Total |
|---|---|---|---|---|---|
| Florida | 0 | 14 | 21 | 7 | 42 |
| Florida St | 0 | 7 | 0 | 6 | 13 |

=== Alabama ===
| | 1 | 2 | 3 | 4 | Total |
|---|---|---|---|---|---|
| Florida | 7 | 0 | 0 | 0 | 7 |
| Alabama | 7 | 3 | 7 | 7 | 24 |

=== Ole Miss ===
| | 1 | 2 | 3 | 4 | Total |
|---|---|---|---|---|---|
| Florida | 9 | 0 | 0 | 7 | 16 |
| Ole Miss | 0 | 0 | 0 | 0 | 0 |

=== Auburn ===
| | 1 | 2 | 3 | 4 | Total |
|---|---|---|---|---|---|
| Auburn | 16 | 10 | 0 | 0 | 26 |
| Florida | 0 | 7 | 6 | 7 | 20 |

=== Georgia ===
| | 1 | 2 | 3 | 4 | Total |
|---|---|---|---|---|---|
| Georgia | 0 | 0 | 0 | 10 | 10 |
| Florida | 0 | 7 | 0 | 0 | 7 |

- Passing: Bowden 7/14, 144 Yds, Rushing: Moore 17/64, Receiving: Jackson 3/71

=== Kentucky ===
| | 1 | 2 | 3 | 4 | Total |
|---|---|---|---|---|---|
| Kentucky | 0 | 0 | 0 | 0 | 0 |
| Florida | 7 | 12 | 7 | 14 | 40 |

=== LSU ===
| | 1 | 2 | 3 | 4 | Total |
|---|---|---|---|---|---|
| LSU | 0 | 0 | 3 | 0 | 3 |
| Florida | 0 | 0 | 0 | 3 | 3 |

A massive rainstorm inundated Florida Field during the game, allowing a 4–4 Florida team to hang close enough with No. 8 LSU to tie the game at 3 with 2:08 left. LSU missed seven field goals during the deluge. The front page of the Youngstown Vindicator reported the next day that during the pre-game invocation, Catholic priest Michael Gannon prayed, "And if it be Thy will, we'd like You to stop the rain." It immediately started raining harder and continued heavily throughout the game

=== Miami (FL) ===
| | 1 | 2 | 3 | 4 | Total |
|---|---|---|---|---|---|
| Miami (FL) | 0 | 0 | 0 | 6 | 6 |
| Florida | 0 | 3 | 0 | 14 | 17 |

=== North Carolina ===
| | 1 | 2 | 3 | 4 | Total |
|---|---|---|---|---|---|
| North Carolina | 7 | 7 | 0 | 14 | 28 |
| Florida | 0 | 9 | 8 | 7 | 24 |
