= Jim Krapf =

American gridiron football player (born 1950)

Profile
- Position: Center

Personal information
- Born: March 1, 1950 (age 76); Wilmington, Delaware, U.S.
- Listed height: 6 ft 0 in (1.83 m)
- Listed weight: 240 lb (109 kg)

Career information
- High school: Tatnall School (Wilmington)
- College: Alabama
- NFL draft: 1973: 12th round, 309th overall pick

Career history
- 1973: BC Lions

Awards and highlights
- First-team All-American (1972); 2× First-team All-SEC (1971, 1972)

James Paul Krapf (born March 1, 1950) is an American former professional football player who played for the BC Lions in the Canadian Football League (CFL). Previously, he played college football at the University of Alabama.

In 1985, he was inducted into the Delaware Sports Hall of Fame.
