= Punt Bama Punt =

American college football game

Auburn Tigers	Alabama Crimson Tide
(8–1)	(10–0)
17	16
Head coach: Ralph Jordan	Head coach: Bear Bryant
AP / Coaches; 9 / 9	AP / Coaches; 2 / 2
	1	2	3	4	Total
Auburn	0	0	0	17	17
Alabama	0	9	7	0	16
- Date: December 2, 1972
- Season: 1972
- Stadium: Legion Field
- Location: Birmingham, Alabama
- Favorite: Alabama by 14

Punt Bama Punt is the nickname given to the 1972 Iron Bowl football game between the Auburn Tigers and Alabama Crimson Tide, in which Auburn blocked two Alabama punts and ran them back for touchdowns to win the game.

The game was played on December 2, 1972, at Legion Field in Birmingham, Alabama. The 2nd-ranked and undefeated (10–0) Alabama team led by head coach Paul Bryant came into the game as a 14-point favorite over the Ralph "Shug" Jordan-coached Tigers, 8–1. An Alabama win meant the Tide would earn a chance to play for the national championship against Texas in the upcoming Cotton Bowl. For the first three and a half quarters, the Tide seemed to have the game well in hand.

Alabama led 16–0 with ten minutes left in the game. With less than 10 minutes left, an Auburn drive stalled and managed only a field goal, which made it 16–3. On the ensuing possession, Alabama was forced to punt. Auburn's Bill Newton blocked Greg Gantt's punt and his teammate David Langner ran the ball back 25 yards for an Auburn touchdown, narrowing the score to 16–10. Several minutes later, Alabama was forced to punt again. Like the previous time, Newton blocked the punt and Langner returned it for a touchdown. Gardner Jett kicked the extra point to give Auburn a 17–16 lead. With the clock winding down, Langner intercepted an Alabama pass to stop their attempted comeback.

In June 2007, Punt Bama Punt was ranked #55 by ESPN.com in its list of the 100 defining moments of college football. In July 2007, CollegeFootballNews.com ranked the game #85 on its list of the 100 Greatest Finishes. In August 2010, ESPN.com ranked the game as the 8th most painful outcome in college history.

== Radio broadcast ==
Gary Sanders was the radio play-by-play announcer for Auburn football in the early 1970s, and his call of the blocked punts, particularly the last one, is familiar to many Auburn fans and has been available on vinyl records, cassette tapes and CDs sold in Auburn University bookstores through the years. The call of the first blocked punt was rather subdued, possibly because Alabama had dominated the game to that point. The call went as follows:

Greg Gantt is in to punt, Johnny Simmons is going back as a single safety, Mitchell and Langner on the...uh...line of scrimmage coming from either side to try to block the kick. Auburn trying to go after it, here's the snap, they got it! Blocked kick! Ball's back to the 25, picked up on the bounce at the 25-yard-line, and in for a touchdown is David Langner!

The call of the second blocked punt is heard more often, and was delivered with much more enthusiasm from Sanders. Additionally, others in the broadcast booth and press box can be heard screaming and yelling over Sanders call. Sanders, possibly due to being caught up in the moment, misidentified Roger Mitchell as the player who blocked the kick, when it was Bill Newton (who had also blocked the first one):

Greg Gantt standing on his own 30, Auburn will try to block it. Auburn going after it, here's the good snap...it is blocked!!! It is blocked!!! It's caught on the run!!! It's caught on the run and he's gonna score!!! David Langner!!! David Langner has scored and Auburn has tied the game!!! Roger Mitchell blocked the kick! Roger Mitchell blocked the kick! And it's 16 to 16!

== Additional sources ==
- War Eagle: A Story of Auburn Football, by Clyde Bolton; copyright 1973 by Clyde Bolton and published by The Strode Publishers, Huntsville, Alabama
