= Stoll Field/McLean Stadium =

Football stadium on the University of Kentucky campus (closed 1972)

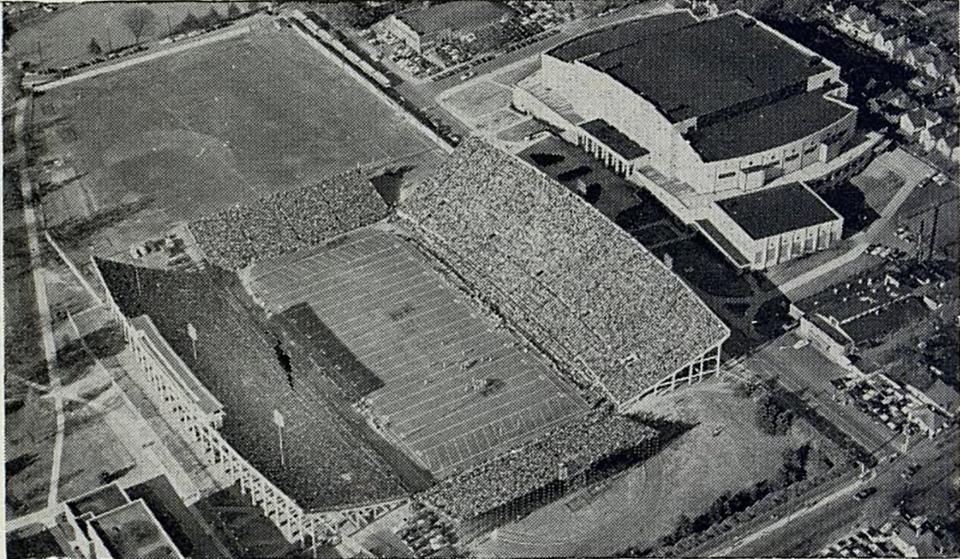
- The stadium, c. 1956. Memorial Coliseum is visible in the upper right.
- Interactive map of Stoll Field/McLean Stadium
- Former names: Stoll Field (1916–1923)
- Address: 202 Avenue of Champions; Lexington, Kentucky; United States
- Coordinates: 38°02′19″N 84°30′08″W
- Owner: University of Kentucky
- Operator: University of Kentucky
- Capacity: 37,000 (1972)

Construction
- Opened: October 14, 1916
- Closed: November 1972

Tenant
- Kentucky Wildcats football (1916–1972)

Stoll Field/McLean Stadium was a multi-purpose stadium in Lexington, Kentucky, United States. It was the home of the University of Kentucky Wildcats football team. The field has been in use since 1880, but the concrete stands were opened in October 1916, and closed following the 1972 season. The stadium was replaced by Kroger Field, which opened in 1973 as Commonwealth Stadium. Memorial Coliseum is located across the street from the site.

The stadium was a two-sided concrete structure, with bleachers in both endzones. It was named for Judge Richard C. Stoll, a prominent alumnus. In November 1924, the grandstands were renamed McLean Stadium in honor of Price Innes McLean, a former center for the Wildcats who had died from injuries sustained in the 1923 Kentucky-Cincinnati game.

The stadium was the home of the Wildcats during the Bear Bryant era (1946–1953), which included the team's first bowl appearance (in the 1947 Great Lakes Bowl), and their first Southeastern Conference (SEC) football championship (in 1950). Bryant's coaching tenure at the predominantly basketball-savvy school is regarded as the best era in UK's football history.

== First game in the south ==
It is the site of the first recorded football game played in the South. A historic marker was erected in 2008 and reads –

Side 1 – "STOLL FIELD: In 1880 the first college football game ever played in the South was held here at what was eventually named Stoll Field. It was dedicated in 1916 at the Kentucky vs. Vanderbilt game and was named in honor of alumnus and long-term Board of Trustees member Judge Richard C. Stoll. The field was the setting of early football games and an integral part of student life.

Side 2 – MCLEAN STADIUM This field, which once pastured President Patterson's cows, was used for military training during World War I and in 1924 it held McLean Stadium. It was named for Price McLean, an engineering student who was fatally injured in a football game in 1923. McLean Stadium was the site of Kentucky football games until they were moved to Commonwealth Stadium in 1973.

On that first game in 1880, which Transylvania University won over Centre College 13¾–0, "The two teams met in a cow pasture, belong to Hubert McGoodwin near Lexington, the present site of the University of Kentucky's Stoll Field . . . There were fifteen players on each team and a player once injured or removed for other reasons could not re-enter the game. At the end of much scuffling and butting of scholarly foreheads, Transylvania was declared the winner by the score of 13-3/4 points to 0 . . . . The team members were older men, a good many of them having whiskers. And they wore extremely heavy shoes and heavily padded apparel."

== First SEC game ==
McLean Stadium was the site of the first football game of the newly formed SEC on September 30, 1933, in which Kentucky defeated Sewanee 7–0.

== End of Stoll Field ==
The final Kentucky game played at the stadium was on November 11, 1972, with the Wildcats beating Vanderbilt 14–13. The final overall games were the 1972 Class A and AA KHSAA State Championships, played on November 24. Trigg County defeated Pikeville 22−0 in the Class A final, while Tates Creek won the Class AA final over Ashland, 16−7.

The field in 2006

The stadium was razed during the 1970s, the south end being replaced with the Singletary Center for the Arts. A field was installed in the north end, perpendicular to the old end zone, and is named Stoll Field. It was used as the practice field for the UK marching band and for intramural sports activities until the expansion of the nearby Gatton Student Center in 2018.
