= Wilbur Jackson =

American football player (born 1951)

No. 40
- Position: Running back

Personal information
- Born: November 19, 1951 (age 74); Ozark, Alabama, U.S.
- Listed height: 6 ft 1 in (1.85 m)
- Listed weight: 215 lb (98 kg)

Career information
- High school: Carroll (Ozark)
- College: Alabama
- NFL draft: 1974: 1st round, 9th overall pick

Career history
- San Francisco 49ers (1974–1979); Washington Redskins (1980–1982)

Awards and highlights
- Super Bowl champion (XVII); PFWA NFL All-Rookie Team (1974); National champion (1973); First-team All-SEC (1973)

Career NFL statistics
- Rushing attempts: 971
- Rushing yards: 3,852
- Rushing touchdowns: 13
- Stats at Pro Football Reference

Wilbur Jackson (born November 19, 1951) is an American former professional football player who was a running back in the National Football League (NFL), He played college football for the Alabama Crimson Tide and was selected ninth overall by the San Francisco 49ers in the first round of the 1974 NFL draft. He played five seasons for San Francisco, and then three years with the Washington Redskins.

Jackson was the first black player to be offered a football scholarship at the University of Alabama and was inducted into the Alabama Sports Hall of Fame in 2007. He owns the Alabama school record for yards per carry (7.2) for his career (1,529 yards on 212 attempts) from 1971 to 1973. Against Virginia Tech in 1973 he rushed for 138 yards on 5 carries, an average of 27.6 yards per carry.

During the Super Bowl XVII highlight film, Jackson can be seen pulling up lame with a hamstring injury after attempting to stop Fulton Walker of the Miami Dolphins from returning a kickoff 98 yards for a touchdown, the first such score in Super Bowl history.

== NFL career statistics ==
Legend
	Won the Super Bowl
**Bold**	Career high

=== Regular season ===
Year	Team	Games		Rushing					Receiving				
Year	Team	GP	GS	Att	Yds	Avg	Lng	TD	Rec	Yds	Avg	Lng	TD
1974	SFO	14	13	174	705	4.1	64	0	23	190	8.3	31	**2**
1975	SFO	14	2	78	303	3.9	44	0	17	128	7.5	20	0
1976	SFO	14	**14**	**200**	**792**	4.0	24	1	33	324	9.8	32	1
1977	SFO	14	14	179	780	**4.4**	**80**	**7**	22	169	7.7	24	0
1979	SFO	**16**	**14**	114	375	3.3	16	2	**53**	**422**	8.0	**34**	0
1980	WAS	**16**	**14**	176	708	4.0	55	3	27	279	**10.3**	27	1
1981	WAS	5	2	46	183	4.0	14	0	7	51	7.3	16	0
1982	WAS	1	0	4	6	1.5	2	0	1	9	9.0	9	0
		94	73	971	3,852	4.0	80	13	183	1,572	8.6	34	4

=== Playoffs ===
Year	Team	Games		Rushing					Receiving				
Year	Team	GP	GS	Att	Yds	Avg	Lng	TD	Rec	Yds	Avg	Lng	TD
1982	WAS	**4**	0	**8**	**27**	**3.4**	**7**	0	0	0	0.0	0	0
		4	0	8	27	3.4	7	0	0	0	0.0	0	0

== See also ==
- Alabama Crimson Tide football yearly statistical leaders
