= Alan Lowry =

American football player (born 1950)

Alan D. Lowry
Profile
- Position: Coach

Personal information
- Born: November 21, 1950 (age 75); Miami, Oklahoma, U.S.
- Listed height: 5 ft 10 in (1.78 m)
- Listed weight: 186 lb (84 kg)

Career information
- High school: Irving (Irving, Texas)
- College: Texas
- NFL draft: 1973: 13th round, 316th overall pick

Career history
- Texas (1973) Graduate assistant; Virginia Tech (1974); Wyoming (1975–1976); Dallas Cowboys (1976) Scouting department; Texas (1976–1981) Defensive backs coach; Dallas Cowboys (1982–1990) Special teams / wide receivers coach; Tampa Bay Buccaneers (1991) Special teams / tight ends coach; San Francisco 49ers (1992–1995) Special teams coach; Houston Oilers (1996) Defensive assistant coach / quality control coach; Tennessee Oilers (1997–1998) Wide receivers coach; Tennessee Titans (1999–2013) Special teams coach

Awards and highlights
- Super Bowl champion (XXIX); National champion (1970); 2× First-team All-SWC (1971, 1972); Cotton Bowl Offensive MVP (1973); 1972 Houston Post SWC MVP for Offense; 2× Southwest Conference Champion Baseball (1971, 1973); 3× Cotton Bowl (1971, 1972, 1973)

Alan D. Lowry (born November 21, 1950) is a former National Football League (NFL) and college football coach, best known as the architect of the Music City Miracle. He coached for several teams over more than 25 years, winning one Super Bowl and going to another. Prior to coaching he played football at the University of Texas, where he won a national championship and three conference championships, was named to the All-Conference team twice at two different positions and was named the 1973 Cotton Bowl Offensive MVP.

== Player ==
At the University of Texas, Lowry was a two-sport athlete at Texas and a three-way player for the football team. During his sophomore and junior seasons he played defensive back, but in his senior year he was the team's starting quarterback. He was also the team's starting punter in his junior and senior years. He's the last Longhorn to earn All-Southwest Conference honors at two different positions, and one of few players to ever do so at all.

Heavily recruited out of Irving High School where he played quarterback, he chose Texas over Oklahoma and Texas Christian. He was 2nd Team All-State in football, led his team to the 1968 State quarterfinals, and was All-District in baseball. He also lettered in basketball.

Lowry played back-up quarterback and defensive back on the freshman team. The next year, he played defensive back for the varsity. He played in eight games that year despite injuries, including the 1970 Cotton Bowl. That season Texas won the Southwest Conference Championship and the national championship.

For his junior year, Lowry again was a starter at defensive back. He was also the team's punter. That season, he played in every game, led the team in interceptions, and made the All Southwest Conference Team. The Longhorns were again Southwest Conference Champions, and lost to Penn State in the Cotton Bowl to finish the season ranked #12.

Immediately after the 1972 Cotton Bowl, Coach Royal told Lowry not to plan on playing baseball because he would be moving to quarterback and would need to focus on spring training. Assistant Coach Fred Akers moved from coaching the defensive backfield to the offensive backfield and he took Lowry with him. The following season, he started every game despite an injury to his elbow and forearm during the Utah State game. He led the Longhorns to a 10–1 record, including wins over #4 Alabama and #17 Arkansas, with the only loss coming to #2 Oklahoma. That one loss cost them a chance at the national championship. He again was named to the All-Conference team, this time as quarterback while continuing to be the team's punter. In his role as punter, he kicked an 82-yard punt against Baylor that year, tying the school record set by Jack Collins in 1959. In the 1973 Cotton Bowl he rushed for 117 yards, which, at the time, was the 2nd best performance by a Texas quarterback in the Cotton Bowl. Running back Roosevelt Leaks also ran for more than 100 yards in that game, making it the first time Texas had two 100-yard rushers in the same bowl game. Lowry, who was fighting a 104 degree fever that day, scored the game-winning touchdown on a controversial 34 yard touchdown run in which he stepped very close to, if not onto, the sideline at the 10 yard line. As a result, Lowry was named the Offensive Outstanding Player for the game and the Longhorns finished the season ranked #3 in the country. He was a team co-captain and team MVP.

In addition to playing football, Lowry was also a starter for the baseball team in 1971 and 1973. He missed part of the 1971 season, when he played in the outfield, with an ankle injury he suffered waterskiing. He skipped the 1972 season to participate in spring football drills, missing his only chance to go to the College World Series. He did manage to play summer baseball for the Austin Aztecas in 1972. In 1973, he moved to shortstop. He missed the start of the season with a pulled leg muscle and only played in 4 games before his season was cut short by the same injury that ended his athletic career. He graduated with a year of eligibility left.

In the 1973 NFL draft in February of that year, Lowry was drafted 316th overall in the 13th round by the New England Patriots as a quarterback. However, in April of that year, while playing baseball for the Longhorns, he noticed pain in his arm that wouldn't go away, numbness and blue fingertips. After first suspecting nerve damage it was determined that he had blood clots, two in his right hand and in one in his elbow, so in May of that year, he ended his career without ever playing a down in the NFL. The cause of the injury was stretching in the artery caused by throwing a baseball, and was similar to the injury that ended the career of Sandy Koufax. The news was particularly concerning since his father had died from a blood clot early in 1972.

In 1989, Lowry was inducted into the Longhorn Hall of Honor.

=== Records ===
- UT Record – Most interceptions returned for a touchdown, career (2), Surpassed by Greg Brown in 2000
- **UT Record – Most interceptions returned for a touchdown, season (2), tied by Brown in 2000, Michael Huff in 2002 and 2003, Brandon Foster in 2007 and Earl Thomas in 2009**
- **UT Record – Longest punt (82 yards), tied Jack Collins**

Bold means still active

== Coaching ==
Lowry began his coaching career at Texas as a graduate assistant coaching the scout team in 1973. After graduation in 1974, he went to coach at Virginia Tech before moving to the University of Wyoming to join Fred Akers' coaching staff in 1975. He resigned that post in summer of 1976 due to the serious illness of his mother. Following her death, he spent the fall of 1976 grading films for the Dallas Cowboys scouting department before rejoining new Texas head coach Akers at the University of Texas (1977–81) for five seasons as defensive backs coach.

Lowry was a coach at the NFL level for 32 seasons.

He spent his first nine seasons with the Dallas Cowboys (1982–90). He originally joined the Cowboys in 1982 as their special teams coach before shifting to receivers (1988–90). During his time with the Cowboys, they went to the playoffs four times, won the NFC East twice and went to the 1982 NFC Championship game.

In 1991, he served as the special teams/tight ends coach for the Tampa Bay Buccaneers, and as special teams coach for the San Francisco 49ers from 1992 to 1995. In San Francisco, Lowry and the Niners made three NFC Championship Game appearances (1992, 1993, 1994) and captured a Super Bowl Championship (XXIX).

In 1996, he moved onto the Houston Oilers and stayed with them through 17 seasons as they moved from Houston to Memphis and then Nashville and changed mascots from Oilers to Titans. During his time with the franchise, the teams went to the playoffs six times, won the AFC Central once and the AFC South twice, went to the 2002 AFC Championship Game and won the 1999 AFC Championship, but lost Super Bowl XXXIV coming up one yard short of beating the St. Louis Rams.

Lowry is perhaps best known for masterminding the "miracle" play with the Tennessee Titans in what is now known as the Music City Miracle. It took place in a Wild Card game of the NFL Playoffs involving the Titans and Buffalo Bills on January 8, 2000. Steve Christie, the Bills' kicker, had just kicked a 41-yard field goal to put Buffalo up 16–15 with only sixteen seconds remaining in the game. On the ensuing kickoff, Christie kicked off, and Titans player Lorenzo Neal received. Neal handed the ball off to Titans tight end Frank Wycheck, who then lateraled the ball across the whole field to another Titans player, Kevin Dyson, who then ran down the sidelines for a 75-yard touchdown. They would go on to Super Bowl XXXIV, losing to the St. Louis Rams 23–16.

On January 11, 2013, Lowry was let go by the Titans after 17 seasons with the franchise.

Starting in 2016, Lowry worked with Ravenwood High School's football team as a volunteer assistant.

== Personal life ==
Lowry is a native of Miami, Oklahoma, and currently resides in Franklin, Tennessee, with his wife, Donna. The couple has two daughters, Marta (41) and Lindsay (36). Alan Lowry grew up in Irving, Texas. Graduated from Irving High School in 1969 where he was the QB of the Irving Tigers. Lowry was inducted into the Irving Independent School District First Hall of Fame class in 2012.
