= 1972 Auburn Tigers football team =

American college football season

1972 Auburn Tigers football

Gator Bowl champion

Gator Bowl, W 24–3 vs. Colorado
- Conference: Southeastern Conference

Ranking
- Coaches: No. 7
- AP: No. 5
- Record: 10–1 (6–1 SEC)
- Head coach: Ralph Jordan (22nd season)
- Home stadium: Cliff Hare Stadium; Legion Field

1972 Southeastern Conference football standings
	Conf.					Overall
Team	W		L		T	W		L		T
No. 7 Alabama $	7	–	1	–	0	10	–	2	–	0
No. 5 Auburn	6	–	1	–	0	10	–	1	–	0
No. 11 LSU	4	–	1	–	1	9	–	2	–	1
No. 8 Tennessee	4	–	2	–	0	10	–	2	–	0
Georgia	4	–	3	–	0	7	–	4	–	0
Florida	3	–	3	–	1	5	–	5	–	1
Ole Miss	2	–	5	–	0	5	–	5	–	0
Kentucky	2	–	5	–	0	3	–	8	–	0
Mississippi State	1	–	6	–	0	4	–	7	–	0
Vanderbilt	0	–	6	–	0	3	–	8	–	0
$ – Conference champion; Rankings from AP Poll

The 1972 Auburn Tigers football team under the leadership of coach Ralph "Shug" Jordan completed the regular season with a record of 9–1, earning them an invitation to the Gator Bowl against Colorado, which they won by a score of 24–3. They completed the season with a record of 10–1 and ranked #5 in the AP poll and #7 in the UPI.

Five players were named all-SEC first team for 1972: defensive back Dave Beck, tail back Terry Henley, offensive tackle Mac Lorendo, defensive end Danny Sanspree, and defensive tackle Benny Sivley.

The famous Punt Bama Punt game took place during the 1972 season, where Auburn, trailing Alabama 16–0 with 10 minutes left in the game, came back to win 17–16 after scoring a field goal followed by two blocked punts that were returned for touchdowns.

== Schedule ==
Date	Opponent	Rank	Site	TV	Result	Attendance	Source
September 9	at Mississippi State		Mississippi Veterans Memorial Stadium; Jackson, MS		W 14–3	40,000	
September 23	Chattanooga*		Cliff Hare Stadium; Auburn, AL		W 14–7	42,000–43,000	
September 30	No. 4 Tennessee		Legion Field; Birmingham, Alabama (rivalry)		W 10–6	69,483	
October 7	at No. 18 Ole Miss	No. 17	Mississippi Veterans Memorial Stadium; Jackson, MS (rivalry)		W 19–13	46,421	
October 14	at No. 8 LSU	No. 9	Tiger Stadium; Baton Rouge, LA (rivalry)		L 7–35	70,132	
October 21	Georgia Tech*	No. 14	Cliff Hare Stadium; Auburn, AL (rivalry)		W 24–14	60,261	
October 28	No. 17 Florida State*^{†}	No. 12	Cliff Hare Stadium; Auburn, AL		W 27–14	58,142	
November 4	at Florida	No. 11	Florida Field; Gainesville, FL (rivalry)		W 26–20	57,551	
November 18	Georgia	No. 11	Cliff Hare Stadium; Auburn, AL (rivalry)		W 27–10	61,348	
December 2	vs. No. 2 Alabama	No. 9	Legion Field; Birmingham, AL (Iron Bowl)		W 17–16	72,386	
December 30	vs. No. 13 Colorado*	No. 6	Gator Bowl Stadium; Jacksonville, FL (Gator Bowl)	ABC	W 24–3	71,114	
*Non-conference game; ^{†}Homecoming; Rankings from AP Poll released prior to the game

== Rankings ==
Ranking movements Legend: ██ Increase in ranking ██ Decrease in ranking — = Not ranked т = Tied with team above or below
	Week														
Poll	Pre	1	2	3	4	5	6	7	8	9	10	11	12	13	Final
AP	—	—	—	—	17	9	14 т	12	11	11	11	10	9	6	5
Coaches	—	20	—	—	14	9	15	12	10	10	10	10	9	7	Not released
