= 1972–73 NCAA football bowl games =

Series of post-season NCAA football games

- Season: 1972
- Number of bowls: 19
- Bowl games: November 24, 1972 – January 1, 1973
- National Championship: 1973 Rose Bowl
- Location of Championship: Rose Bowl, Pasadena, California
- Champions: USC
Bowl record by conference
Conference	Bowls	Record	Number of teams in final AP poll

The 1972–73 NCAA football bowl games were a series of post-season games played in November and December 1972 and January 1973 to end the 1972 NCAA University Division football season and the 1972 NCAA College Division football season. A total of 19 team-competitive games were played. The University Division post-season began with the Liberty Bowl on December 18, 1972, and concluded on January 1, 1973, with the Orange Bowl.

== Schedule ==
Date	Game	Site	TV	Teams	Results
Nov. 24	Knute Rockne Bowl	Boardwalk Hall; Atlantic City, New Jersey		Bridgeport (10–0); Slippery Rock (8–1–1)	Bridgeport 27; Slippery Rock 22
Nov. 24	Amos Alonzo Stagg Bowl	Garrett–Harrison Stadium; Phenix City, Alabama		Heidelberg (10–0); Fort Valley State (10–1)	Heidelberg 28; Fort Valley State 16
Dec. 2	Orange Blossom Classic	Miami Orange Bowl; Miami, Florida		Florida A&M (4–6); Maryland Eastern Shore (4–4)	Florida A&M 41; Maryland Eastern Shore 21
Dec. 2	Pelican Bowl	Wallace Wade Stadium; Durham, North Carolina		No. 8 Grambling (10–2); NC Central (9–1)	Grambling 56; NC Central 6
Dec. 9	Boardwalk Bowl	Boardwalk Hall; Atlantic City, New Jersey	ABC	UMass (8–2); UC Davis (6–1–2)	UMass 35; UC Davis 14
Dec. 9	Grantland Rice Bowl	BREC Memorial Stadium; Baton Rouge, Louisiana	ABC	No. 2 Louisiana Tech (11–0); Tennessee Tech (10–1)	Louisiana Tech 35; Tennessee Tech 0
Dec. 9	Pioneer Bowl	Memorial Stadium; Wichita Falls, Texas	ABC	No. 5 Tennessee State (10–1); Drake (7–4)	Tennessee State 29; Drake 21
Dec. 9	Camellia Bowl	Hughes Stadium; Sacramento, California	ABC	No. 3 Cal Poly (8–0–1); No. 6 North Dakota (9–1)	North Dakota 38; Cal Poly 21
Dec. 18	Liberty Bowl	Memphis Memorial Stadium; Memphis, Tennessee	ABC	Georgia Tech (6–4–1); Iowa State (5–5–1)	Georgia Tech 31; Iowa State 30
Dec. 23	Fiesta Bowl	Sun Devil Stadium; Tempe, Arizona	Mizlou	No. 15 Arizona State (9–2); Missouri (6–5)	Arizona State 49; Missouri 35
Dec. 29	Tangerine Bowl	Tangerine Bowl; Orlando, Florida		Tampa (9–2); Kent State (6–4–1)	Tampa 21; Kent State 18
Dec. 29	Peach Bowl	Fulton County Stadium; Atlanta, Georgia	Mizlou	NC State (7–3–1); No. 18 West Virginia (8–3)	NC State 49; West Virginia 13
Dec. 30	Sun Bowl	Sun Bowl; El Paso, Texas	CBS	No. 16 North Carolina (10–1); Texas Tech (8–3)	North Carolina 32; Texas Tech 28
Dec. 30	Gator Bowl	Gator Bowl Stadium; Jacksonville, Florida	NBC	No. 6 Auburn (9–1); No. 13 Colorado (8–3)	Auburn 24; Colorado 3
Dec. 30	Astro-Bluebonnet Bowl	Astrodome; Houston, Texas	HTN	No. 11 Tennessee (9–2); No. 10 LSU (9–1–1)	Tennessee 24; LSU 17
Dec. 31	Sugar Bowl	Tulane Stadium; New Orleans, Louisiana	ABC	No. 2 Oklahoma (10–1); No. 5 Penn State (10–1)	Oklahoma 14; Penn State 0
Jan. 1	Cotton Bowl Classic	Cotton Bowl; Dallas, Texas	CBS	No. 7 Texas (9–1); No. 4 Alabama (10–1)	Texas 17; Alabama 13
Jan. 1	Rose Bowl	Rose Bowl; Pasadena, California	NBC	No. 1 USC (11–0); No. 3 Ohio State (9–1)	USC 42; Ohio State 17
Jan. 1	Orange Bowl	Miami Orange Bowl; Miami, Florida	NBC	No. 9 Nebraska (8–2–1); No. 12 Notre Dame (8–2)	Nebraska 40; Notre Dame 6

Rankings from AP Poll
