= 1972 Sugar Bowl (December) =

American college football game

- 39th Sugar Bowl
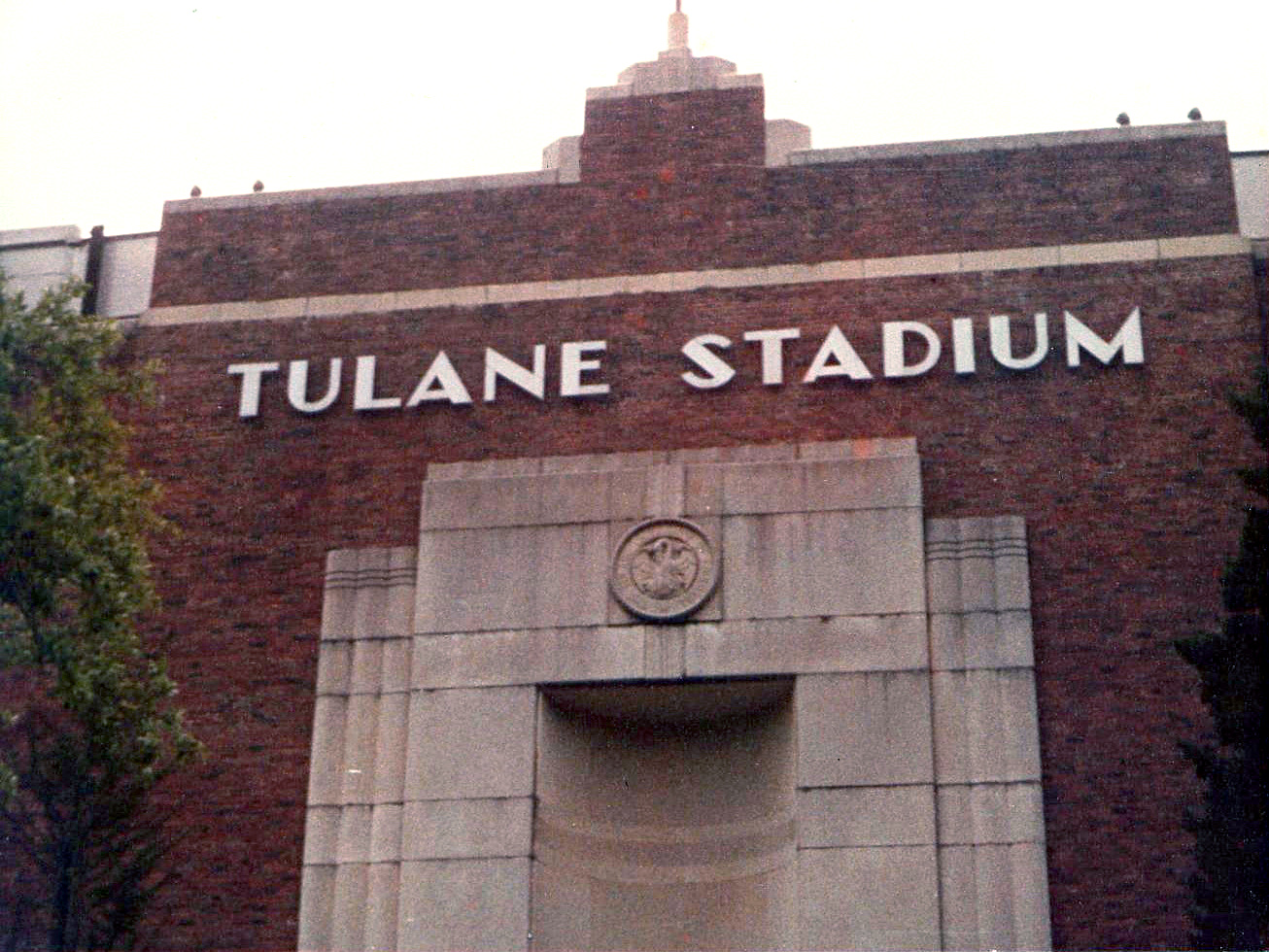
- Tulane Stadium in New Orleans, Louisiana, hosted the Sugar Bowl.
Penn State Nittany Lions	Oklahoma Sooners
(10–1)	(10–1)
Independent	Big Eight
0	14
Head coach: Joe Paterno	Head coach: Chuck Fairbanks
AP / Coaches; 5 / 8	AP / Coaches; 2 / 2
	1	2	3	4	Total
Penn State	0	0	0	0	0
Oklahoma	0	7	0	7	14
- Date: December 31, 1972
- Season: 1972
- Stadium: Tulane Stadium
- Location: New Orleans, Louisiana
- MVP: Tinker Owens (Oklahoma FL)
- Favorite: Oklahoma by 14 points
- Referee: Bill Jennings (Big Eight) (split crew: Big Eight, ECAC)
- Attendance: 80,123

United States TV coverage
- Network: ABC
- Announcers: Chris Schenkel, Bud Wilkinson

The 1972 Sugar Bowl (December) was the 39th edition of the college football bowl game, played at Tulane Stadium in New Orleans, on Sunday, December 31. Part of the 1972–73 bowl game season, it featured the second-ranked Oklahoma Sooners of the Big Eight Conference and the independent #5 Penn State Nittany Lions. It was played for the first time on New Year's Eve, at night, and Oklahoma shut out Penn State, 14–0.

The shutout was the first for Penn State in over six years, and it was their first bowl loss in a decade.

This was the only Sugar Bowl between 1950 and January 1995 without a team from the Southeastern Conference (SEC).

== Teams ==
=== Oklahoma ===
The Sooners' only loss was at Colorado. They broke a three-year losing streak to rival Nebraska.

=== Penn State ===
After dropping their opener at Tennessee, Penn State had won ten straight.

== Game summary ==
The game kicked off on New Year's Eve shortly after 8 p.m. CST, televised by ABC. The network rejected the Sugar Bowl's request for a 7 p.m. CST kickoff in order to televise The F.B.I.; New Orleans, Baton Rouge and Lafayette were blacked out.

Penn State was without their leading rusher, junior running back John Cappelletti, who was suffering from a virus and a temperature of 102 °F (39 °C). Without the future Heisman Trophy winner, the Lions' defense was forced to step up and it held the Sooners explosive Wishbone offense to only 14 points while forcing eight fumbles, recovering five. However, Oklahoma out gained the Lions 543 to 196 yards, 278 to 49 on the ground. The game had ten turnovers, five by each team.

=== Scoring ===
First quarter

No scoring

Second quarter

- Oklahoma – Tinker Owens 27-yard pass from Dave Robertson (Rick Fulcher kick)

Third quarter

No scoring

Fourth quarter

- Oklahoma – Leon Crosswhite 1-yard run (Fulcher kick)

== Statistics ==
Statistics	Oklahoma	Penn State
First downs	20	11
Rushes–Yards	76–278	28–49
Yards Passing	175	147
Passes	7–12–0	12–31–1
Total yards	88–453	59–196
Punts-Average	8–32.8	10–42.9
Fumbles–Lost	8–5	6–4
Turnovers	5	5
Penalties–Yards	3–55	3–15

== Aftermath ==
Oklahoma was forced to forfeit nine games from the 1972 season after they had used two ineligible freshmen. Despite the forfeit, Penn State refused to accept the win in the 1972 Sugar Bowl, thus the NCAA does not recognize the Penn State forfeit win over Oklahoma. The NCAA also stated that forfeits were not part of the NCAA sanctions levied against the Sooners. The NCAA says it only restricted OU's scholarships, TV appearances, and bowl appearances.

The scandal however, prevented the Sooners from playing in bowl games for two seasons after Chuck Fairbanks's departure to the New England Patriots. Offensive coordinator Barry Switzer, who spearheaded Oklahoma's adoption of the Wishbone formation during the 1970 season, succeeded Fairbanks.

The 1974 Sooners were named national champions by the Associated Press, but could not be ranked by the coaches' poll, due to a rule adopted following the 1973 season by the American Football Coaches Association which prohibited teams on major NCAA probation from the rankings.

The Sooners were allowed to appear on television in 1973, but were banned in 1974 and the 1975 regular season. Oklahoma returned to television with the Orange Bowl on January 1, 1976, when it defeated Michigan 14-6 to secure its second consecutive national championship.

Oklahoma did not return to the Sugar Bowl until after the 2003 season, losing in the Bowl Championship Series championship game to LSU 21-14.

Penn State lost the Sugar Bowl twice more in the 1970s to Alabama before breaking through vs. Georgia in the 1983 game to win the national championship for 1982.
