= 1972 Iowa State Cyclones football team =

American college football season

1972 Iowa State Cyclones football

Liberty Bowl, L 30–31 vs. Georgia Tech
- Conference: Big Eight Conference
- Record: 5–6–1 (2–4–1 Big 8)
- Head coach: Johnny Majors (5th season)
- Offensive coordinator: George Haffner (2nd season)
- Offensive scheme: Pro set
- Defensive coordinator: Jackie Sherrill (3rd season)
- Base defense: 4–4
- Captains: George Amundson; Matt Blair
- Home stadium: Clyde Williams Field

1972 Big Eight Conference football standings
	Conf.					Overall
Team	W		L		T	W		L		T
No. 2 Oklahoma $	6	–	1	–	0	11	–	1	–	0
No. 4 Nebraska $	5	–	1	–	1	9	–	2	–	1
No. 16 Colorado	4	–	3	–	0	8	–	4	–	0
Oklahoma State	4	–	3	–	0	6	–	5	–	0
Missouri	3	–	4	–	0	6	–	6	–	0
Iowa State	2	–	4	–	1	5	–	6	–	1
Kansas	2	–	5	–	0	4	–	7	–	0
Kansas State	1	–	6	–	0	3	–	8	–	0
$ – Conference champion; The Big 8 Conference mandated Oklahoma forfeits in three conference games, giving Nebraska the title. Oklahoma reverted this record at a later date; hence, both Oklahoma and Nebraska claim this title.; Rankings from AP Poll

The 1972 Iowa State Cyclones football team represented Iowa State University in the Big Eight Conference during the 1972 NCAA University Division football season. In their fifth and final year under head coach Johnny Majors, the Cyclones compiled a 5–6–1 record (2–4–1 against conference opponents), finished in seventh place in the conference, and outscored opponents by a combined total of 319 to 238. They played their home games at Clyde Williams Field in Ames, Iowa.

George Amundson and Matt Blair were the team captains.

== Schedule ==
Date	Time	Opponent	Rank	Site	TV	Result	Attendance	Source
September 16	2:30 pm	at Colorado State*		Hughes Stadium; Fort Collins, CO		W 41–0	20,651	
September 23	1:30 pm	Utah*		Clyde Williams Field; Ames, IA		W 44–22	28,885	
September 30	1:30 pm	New Mexico*		Clyde Williams Field; Ames, IA		W 31–0	29,697	
October 14	2:30 pm	at No. 13 Colorado	No. 18	Folsom Field; Boulder, CO		L 22–34	51,668	
October 21	1:30 pm	Kansas State	No. 20	Clyde Williams Field; Ames, IA (rivalry)		W 55–22	36,231	
October 28	1:30 p.m.	at Kansas	No. 15	Memorial Stadium; Lawrence, KS		W 34–8	37,250	
November 4	1:30 pm	No. 7 Oklahoma^{†}	No. 14	Clyde Williams Field; Ames, IA		L 6–20	36,231	
November 11	1:30 pm	No. 3 Nebraska	No. 17	Clyde Williams Field; Ames, IA (rivalry)		T 23–23	36,231	
November 18	12:20 pm	at No. 19 Missouri	No. 12	Faurot Field; Columbia, MO (rivalry)	ABC	L 5–6	49,500	
November 25	1:30 p.m.	at Oklahoma State	No. 17	Lewis Field; Stillwater, OK		L 14–45	22,500	
December 2	9:30 p.m.	at San Diego State*		San Diego Stadium; San Diego, CA		L 14–27	39,048	
December 18	8:00 p.m.	vs. Georgia Tech*		Liberty Bowl Memorial Stadium; Memphis, TN (Liberty Bowl)	ABC	L 30–31	50,021	
*Non-conference game; ^{†}Homecoming; Rankings from AP Poll released prior to the game; All times are in Central time

== Rankings ==
Ranking movements Legend: ██ Increase in ranking ██ Decrease in ranking — = Not ranked RV = Received votes
	Week														
Poll	Pre	1	2	3	4	5	6	7	8	9	10	11	12	13	Final
AP	RV	RV	RV	RV	20	18	20	15	14	17	12	17	RV	—	RV
UPI	19	17	18	15	17	14	—	14	13	14	12	18	—	—	—

== Game summaries ==
=== At Colorado State ===
To open the 1972 season, Iowa State went on the road to shutout the Colorado State Rams 41–0, the first of three games against Western Athletic Conference (WAC) opponents. The first quarter of the game was a stalemate, but the rushing ability of tailback Jerry Moses powered an 86-yard drive that concluded in a four-yard touchdown run on a sneak play by George Amundson in the first minutes of the second quarter. George Amundson completed 12 of 126 passes for 171 yards, throwing three touchdowns and running for another. Don Greenwood, who started at tight end after Keith Krepfle cracked a neck vertebrae during practice the previous week, caught six passes for 80 yards, including a seven-yard touchdown reception. Moses, who gained 66 yards in twelve carries, suffered a knee injury early in the second quarter and was replaced by Mike Strachan, who had 143 yards in seven carries, including a 24-yard run to set up the third Iowa State touchdown. In the final minutes of the blowout, backup quarterback Wayne Stanley came in and ran for 53 yards, including the final touchdown.

=== Utah ===
At its home opener, Iowa State came back from a 14–16 halftime deficit against Utah to score 28 unanswered points, defeating the WAC team 44–22. Amundson ran for two touchdowns and threw to Greenwood for two others.

=== New Mexico ===
In its second home game against a WAC opponent, Iowa State shutout New Mexico 31–0. After its third victory, Iowa State was ranked in the AP Top 20 Poll for the first time in the season.

=== At Colorado ===
Coming off of a bye week, 18th-ranked Iowa State went on the road as a 13-point underdog for its first Big Eight conference game, suffering its first loss against 13th-ranked Colorado, 22–34. The ranked vs. ranked matchup was attended by a sellout crowd of over 51,000, the largest sporting event in the state of Colorado to that date. The Buffaloes gained a 14–0 lead on the first two drives and never let the Cyclones get closer than seven points for the rest of the game. The Cyclones were stymied by penalties on both sides of the ball, with nine for 121 yards, including a defensive offsides on a Buffaloes field goal attempt that kept the Colorado drive alive.

=== Kansas State ===
Iowa State recovered from their loss to Colorado to blow out Kansas State at home 55–22.

=== At Kansas ===
No. 15 Iowa State at Kansas

Team	1	2	3	4	Total
• No. 15 Cyclones	17	0	14	3	34
Jayhawks	0	0	8	0	8

- Date: October 28
- Location: Memorial Stadium, Lawrence, KS
- Game start: 1:30 p.m. CDT
- Game attendance: 33,710

Scoring summary
1	13:49	ISU	Willie Jones 49-yard pass from George Amundson (Tom Goedjen kick)	ISU 7–0
1	9:11	ISU	Tom Goedjen 41-yard field goal	ISU 10–0
1	1:04	ISU	George Amundson 71-yard run (Tom Goedjen kick)	ISU 17–0
3	12:48	ISU	Willie Jones 13-yard pass from George Amundson (Tom Goedjen kick)	ISU 24–0
3	8:14	ISU	Ike Harris 18-yard pass from George Amundson (Tom Goedjen kick)	ISU 31–0
3	7:33	KU	Emmett Edwards 15-yard pass from David Jaynes (Rich Jones pass to John Schroll for two-point conversion)	ISU 31–8
4	4:42	ISU	Tom Goedjen 48-yard field goal	ISU 34–8

Iowa State went on the road to blow out Kansas 34–8 in the latter's homecoming game. The Cyclones were heavy favorites against the Jayhawks, who were 2–4 but winless in conference play. Kansas quarterback David Jaynes returned from injury for the game.

=== Oklahoma ===
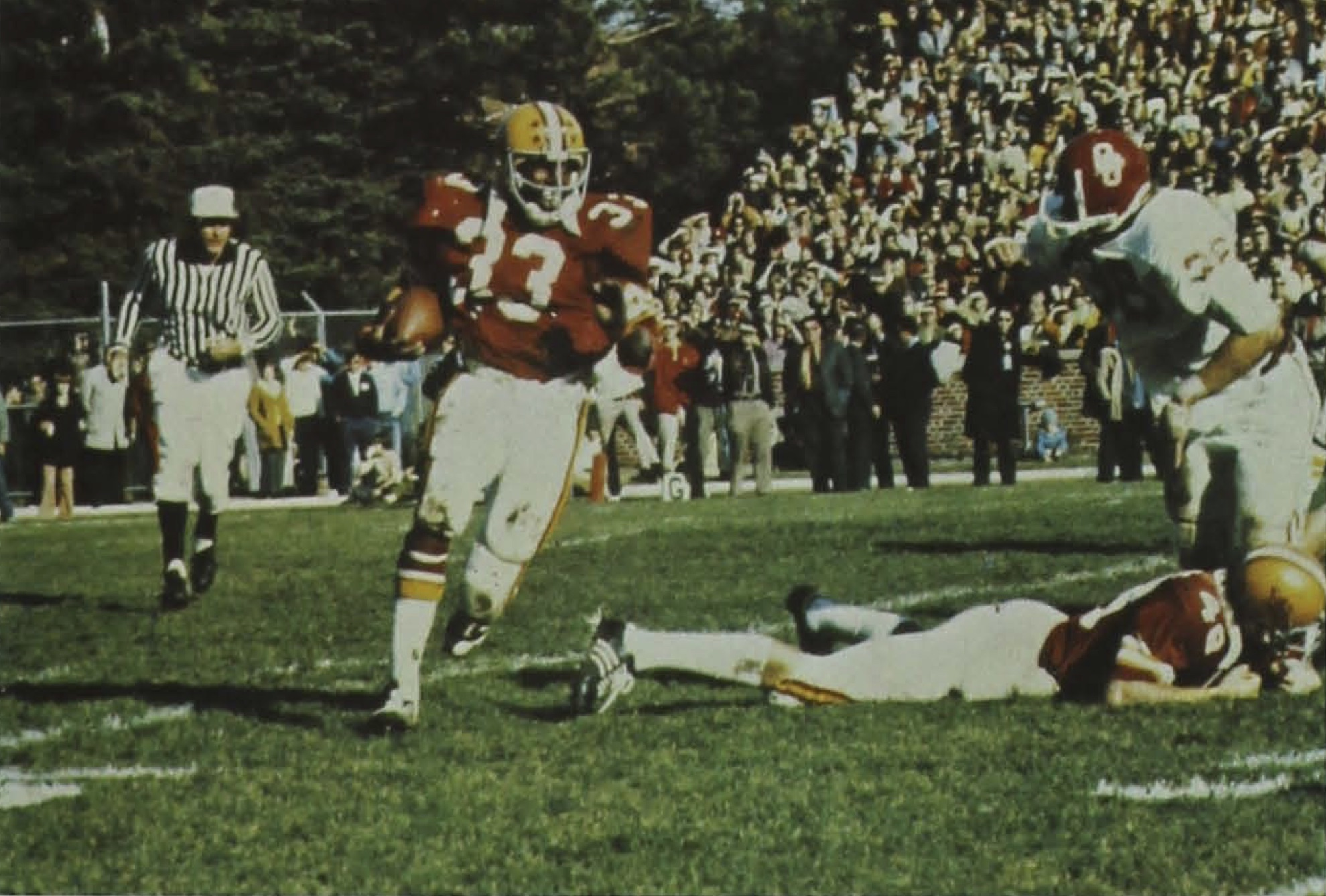
Strachan (#33) breaking free for a run against the Sooners

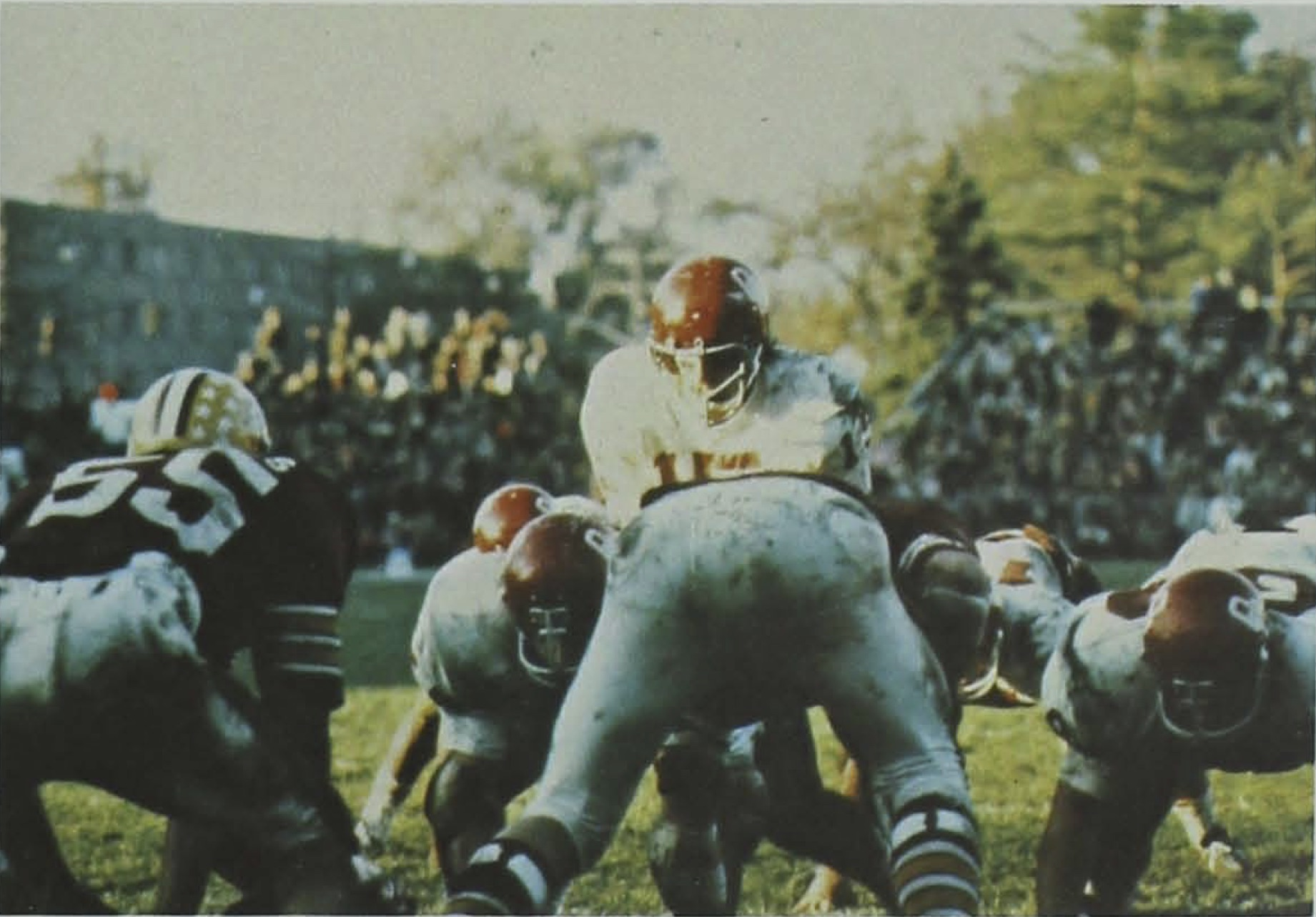
Opposing lines before a snap

In front of an overflow crowd of over 36,000, Iowa State suffered its first home loss in its homecoming game, falling to two-touchdown favorite No. 7 Oklahoma 6–20. Both offenses were hampered by the muddy turf, soaked from a week of rain due to Iowa State's lack of a tarp. Leon Crosswhite and Greg Pruitt combined for over 200 rush yards to establish the dominant Sooners ball control offense, while the Oklahoma defense held Strachan to 50. The Sooners scored first at the beginning of the second quarter when Crosswhite carried for a touchdown on a drive kept alive by a pair of completions from Dave Robertson to John Carroll. Later in the second quarter, a pair of long runs by Amundson and Strachan brought the Cyclones to the Sooner 20. The Sooners defense stiffened there and Amundson slipped while fading on third down. Goedjen kicked a 38-yard field goal to put the Cyclones on the board with nearly five minutes left. The Sooners then marched down the field but stalled near the goal line in the final seconds of the half. Larry Hunt and Steve Burns tackled Robertson for a loss, forcing the Sooners to settle for a Rick Fulcher field goal to bring their lead to 10–3 at the half. In the final minutes of the fourth quarter, Robertson ran for 55 yards on a third and long to the Cyclone 3-yard line before a Pruitt touchdown run put the game out of reach.

=== Nebraska ===
Iowa State came close to upsetting No. 3 Nebraska at home but tied at 23 instead due to a missed game-ending extra point by kicker Tom Goedjen.

=== At Missouri ===
Iowa State was upset on the road by No. 19 Missouri 5–6. Their only points came on a Goedjen field goal towards the end of the first quarter and a safety on a blocked punt towards the end of the third. After Goedjen missed three field goal attempts, Majors elected to go for it with his team on 4th and goal from the Missouri two-yard line with six minutes left in the 4th quarter. Amundson attempted to run the ball in for the touchdown but was taken down for a loss, and Missouri went on to cap their drive with the game-winning field goal by Greg Hill. Despite their loss, they were invited to the 1972 Liberty Bowl to face Georgia Tech after the other teams being considered for the bowl bid also suffered defeats.

=== At Oklahoma State ===
No. 17 Iowa State at Oklahoma State

Team	1	2	3	4	Total
No. 17 Cyclones	7	7	0	0	14
• Cowboys	14	7	0	24	45

- Date: November 25
- Location: Lewis Field, Stillwater, OK
- Game start: 1:30 p.m. CDT
- Game attendance: 26,495

Scoring summary
1	12:17	OSU	Fountain Smith 4-yard run (Eddie Garrett kick failed)	OSU 6–0
1	10:02	OSU	Alton Gerard 1-yard run (Brent Blackman run)	OSU 14–0
1	2:22	ISU	Keith Krepfle 10-yard pass from George Amundson (Tom Goedjen kick)	OSU 14–7
2	14:19	ISU	Willie Jones 25-yard pass from George Amundson (Tom Goedjen kick)	Tied 14–14
2	5:25	OSU	George Palmer 1-yard run (Eddie Garrett kick)	OSU 21–14
4	14:55	OSU	George Palmer 1-yard run (Eddie Garrett kick)	OSU 28–14
4	11:30	OSU	Eddie Garrett 51-yard field goal	OSU 31–14
4	8:50	OSU	Alfred Nelms 23-yard run (Eddie Garrett kick)	OSU 38–14
4	7:25	OSU	Brent Blackman 5-yard run (Eddie Garrett kick)	OSU 45–14

Heading to Lewis Field to face the Oklahoma State Cowboys in the Cyclones' conference finale, Majors sought to avoid another embarrassing defeat before the Liberty Bowl. Although the seventeenth-ranked Cyclones were favored by a touchdown, the 5–4 Cowboys were eager to obtain their first winning season since 1959, secure third place in the Big Eight standings, and avenge their 55–0 loss to the Cyclones in the previous season. Despite early-season upsets of bowl-bound Colorado and Missouri teams, the Cowboys, led by first-year head coach Dave Smith, had not received a bowl invitation and desired to prove their fitness for one. Running a wishbone offense, the Cowboys ranked 4th nationally in rushing yards, powered by quarterback Brent Blackman and running backs George Palmer and Fountain Smith.

The Cyclones started hot with a 28-yard completion from Amundson to Moses on the first play of the game, and got a first down at the Cowboys 26 on a 15-yard Strachan run. The game soon went downhill when the Cowboys' Bob Shepard recovered a Larry Marquardt fumble at the Cowboys 22. On second down, the Cowboys ran a prearranged sleeper pass trick play in which they lined up after a quick huddle before Blackman surprised the Cyclones defense with a pass to Tom Stremme, who had not huddled and was uncovered in the flat. Stremme ran for 64 yards before John Schweizer tackled him at the Cyclones 11, saving the touchdown. A Smith run punched the ball in for the touchdown, but Eddie Garrett missed the extra point. Majors challenged the trick play but the referees upheld their decision. Three plays after the kickoff, Amundson lost the ball when he was hit by Doug Tarrant and it was recovered by Jay Cruse who returned it to the Cyclones 4. Alton Gerard punched the ball in for a touchdown and Blackman converted on a run to put the Cowboys up 14–0 in the first five minutes of the game.

Iowa State rallied after Steve Burns recovered a Palmer fumble on the Cyclones 39 and marched 61 yards in 13 plays down the field to score on an Amundson screen pass to Krepfle towards the end of the first quarter. Another Cowboys fumble, this time by Smith, was recovered by Ted Jornov near midfield, allowing the Cyclones drive 51 yards in seven plays to tie the game with a 25-yard touchdown pass from Amundson to Willie Jones in the first minute of the second quarter. However, Amundson was picked off by Lee Stover halfway through the quarter, giving the Cowboys offense starting field position at the Cyclone 39. Overcoming two illegal procedure penalties, the Cowboys drove in on a Palmer run for a 21–14 halftime lead after Blackman lateraled to Smith for a large gain. The third quarter was scoreless, but in the fourth the Cowboys exploded for 24 points on a Palmer touchdown run, a Garrett field goal, an Alfred Nelms touchdown run, and a Blackman touchdown run to seal their 45–14 victory. With the blowout loss, the Cyclones fell to sixth in the conference and were dropped from both polls.

=== At San Diego State ===
In the final regular season game, Iowa State was upset on the road 14–27 by Pacific Coast Athletic Association champions San Diego State, who were 22-point underdogs. The momentum of the game shifted on the first play of the fourth quarter when a 45-yard Goedjen field goal attempt was blocked by Joe Lavender and returned for a touchdown by Bill Ferguson, tying the game at 14. Phil Danowsky returned the kickoff but fumbled the ball, which was recovered by Ken Jackson to give San Diego State excellent field position at the Iowa State 39-yard line. In three plays, San Diego State quarterback Jesse Freitas passed to Isaac Curtis for the touchdown, giving the Aztecs a 21–14 lead. The Aztecs clinched their victory with 4:56 left in the game after Rick Ash intercepted Amundson on the Iowa State 30, and Frank Miller ran for a 1-yard touchdown in four plays to finish the San Diego State scoring drive. The Cyclones thus finished the regular season with a 5–5–1 record.

== Roster ==
1972 Iowa State Cyclones football team roster
Players
Coaches
Offense

Pos.	#	Name	Class
QB	10	John Piekielko	So
QB	11	Bob Martin	Fr
QB	12	George Amundson	Sr
QB	15	Wendy Holloway	So
QB	16	Bill Miller	Sr
QB	17	Kerry Robinson	So
QB	18	Wayne Stanley	So
TB	25	Joe Palmisano	So
FB	31	Moses Moore	Jr
TB	32	Jerry Moses	So
TB	33	Mike Strachan	So
TB	34	Jim Wingender	So
FL	39	Craig Sabatini	Jr
FB	40	Phil Danowsky	So
FB	43	Bruce Beamon	Jr
FB	45	Bill Shellabarger	Jr
FB	48	Larry Marquardt	Jr
C	52	Jeff Jones	So
C	54	Dave Pittman	Sr
RG	57	Arlen Ciechanowski	So
C	58	Chuck Blaskovich	Jr
LG	62	Dom Bosco	So
RT	63	Terry Andringa	Jr
LG	63	Gary Little	So
C	65	Terry Reelitz	So
LT	66	Kent Barghols	So
RG	67	Mike Ybarra	Jr
LT	70	Jim Christensen	Jr
RT	71	Dan Kneller	Jr
RT	72	Dennis Olson	So
LG	73	Sherman Miller	So
LT	74	Willie Gillis	So
RG	75	Geary Murdock	Sr
RT	76	Jerry Allen	So
RG	77	Steve Berigan	So
RT	77	Henry Lewis	Jr
LT	78	Jon McCarthy	Jr
FL	81	Willie Jones	Jr
SE	82	Charles Penn	Jr
TE	83	Tom Padjen	Sr
TE	84	Don Greenwood	So
SE	85	Ike Harris	Jr
TE	91	Keith Krepfle	Jr
FL	95	Greg Mulhall	Sr

Defense

Pos.	#	Name	Class
S	13	Dave McCurry	Sr
S	17	Scott Bradley	Jr
S	23	Brian Cannon	Sr
RH	24	Rob Bolks	Jr
M	14	Randy Bozich	So
RE	19	Steve Jacobsen	Sr
LB	27	Jim Steinmueller	Sr
RH	35	George Campbell	Sr
LB	37	John Schweizer	Sr
RLB	41	Gary Forge	So
LH	44	Barry Hill	So
RLB	46	Van Hollaway	Sr
M	47	Matt Blair	Sr
MLB	49	Barry Johnson	So
RLB	50	John McKillop	Jr
LLB	51	Tom Karr	Jr
RLB	53	Ken Caratelli	Sr
MLB	55	Ted Jornov	Jr
RT	56	Rick Howe	So
LB	59	Bob Banger	Sr
M	60	John Fritsch	So
MLB	60	Brad Storm	So
RT	61	Bob Herman	So
LLB	64	Steve Burns	Sr
RLB	64	Steve Loney	So
LLB	66	Greg Vondrak	So
RE	67	Dan Falder	So
RT	68	Bob Martinson	Sr
LT	69	Greg Thies	So
LT	72	Paul Ridder	Jr
LT	76	Duane Ohrt	So
LT	78	Larry Hunt	Jr
RE	79	Merv Krakau	Sr
LE	80	Tom Jacks	So
LE	90	Doug Wilke	So
LE	94	Lon Coleman	Jr
RT	98	Pierre Gelinas	So

Special teams

Pos.	#	Name	Class
K	29	Tom Goedjen	So
P, WR	80	Doug Keown	Jr
K	97	Doug Lenth	So
K, QB	99	Mark Williams	Fr

Head coach

- Johnny Majors (5th year)

Coordinators/assistant coaches

- Jackie Sherrill (AHC, DC)
- George Haffner (OC)
- Joe Avezzano (OL)
- King Block (RB)
- Keith Schroeder (LB)
- George Boutselis (DE)
- Jim Dyar (DL)
- Ray Greene (WR)
- Bobby Roper (Secondary)
- Keith Kephart (FR)
- Jerry Fiat (Scout team)
- Frank Randall (head trainer)

Legend

- (C) Team captain
- (S) Suspended
- (I) Ineligible
- Injured
- Redshirt
