= Joe Blahak =

American football player (1950–2016)

No. 27, 21
- Position: Cornerback

Personal information
- Born: August 29, 1950; Columbus, Nebraska, U.S.
- Died: April 25, 2016 (aged 65); Lincoln, Nebraska, U.S.
- Listed height: 5 ft 9 in (1.75 m)
- Listed weight: 187 lb (85 kg)

Career information
- High school: Columbus (NE) Scotus Central
- College: Nebraska
- NFL draft: 1973: 8th round, 183rd overall pick

Career history
- Houston Oilers (1973); Minnesota Vikings (1974–1975); Tampa Bay Buccaneers (1976); New England Patriots (1976); Minnesota Vikings (1977)

Awards and highlights
- 2× National champion (1970, 1971); Second-team All-American (1972); First-team All-Big Eight (1972); Second-team All-Big Eight (1971)

Career NFL statistics
- Games played: 44
- Games started: 1
- Interceptions: 3
- Stats at Pro Football Reference

Joseph Philip Blahak (August 29, 1950 – April 25, 2016) was an American professional football player who was a defensive back in the National Football League (NFL). He played for the Houston Oilers, Minnesota Vikings, Tampa Bay Buccaneers, and New England Patriots. He played college football at the University of Nebraska in Lincoln under head coach Bob Devaney, and was a member of the 1970 and 1971 undefeated national championship teams.

== Early life ==
Born and raised in Columbus, Nebraska, Blahak played football for its Scotus Central Catholic High School and graduated in 1969.

== College career ==
During his junior season at Nebraska in 1971, #27 Blahak was involved in a controversial play on national television. In the first quarter of the "Game of the Century" against #2 Oklahoma on Thanksgiving, he was accused of clipping Sooner punter Joe Wylie halfway through a 72-yard punt return for a touchdown by Johnny Rodgers, but was not penalized. Blahak forced a fumble and recovered another in the game. He also ended Alabama's best scoring chance in the Orange Bowl by intercepting a Terry Davis pass in the end zone; Nebraska crushed the #2 Crimson Tide 38–6 for a 13–0 record and the consensus national title.

In his senior season in 1972, Nebraska finished fourth and won a third consecutive Orange Bowl, defeating Notre Dame, 40–6. In his three seasons as a starter on the NU varsity, the Huskers were 33–2–2 (.919).

== Professional career ==
Blahak was one of ten Huskers selected in the 1973 NFL draft, taken in the eighth round by the Houston Oilers, the 183rd overall pick. He was claimed off waivers the next year by the Minnesota Vikings, where he played two years before going to the newly formed Tampa Bay Buccaneers in the 1976 NFL expansion draft. Blahak was an opening-day starter for the Bucs, but only played with the team for two games. He was one of two players cut to make room for newly signed receiver Morris Owens, and running back Rod McNeill. He was picked up toward the end of the season by the New England Patriots, and returned to the Vikings in 1977 before retiring.

== Personal life ==
On November 28, 1970, he married Diane Melliger of Columbus and had three children. After his NFL career, he returned to Lincoln and worked for an insurance company. He died suddenly at age 65 of an apparent heart attack.

== Awards ==
- 1st team All-Big Eight, 1971
- AP and UPI 2nd-team All-American, 1972
