= 1972 Kansas State Wildcats football team =

American college football season

1972 Kansas State Wildcats football
- Conference: Big Eight Conference
- Record: 3–8 (1–6 Big 8)
- Head coach: Vince Gibson (6th season)
- Home stadium: KSU Stadium

1972 Big Eight Conference football standings
	Conf.					Overall
Team	W		L		T	W		L		T
No. 2 Oklahoma $	6	–	1	–	0	11	–	1	–	0
No. 4 Nebraska $	5	–	1	–	1	9	–	2	–	1
No. 16 Colorado	4	–	3	–	0	8	–	4	–	0
Oklahoma State	4	–	3	–	0	6	–	5	–	0
Missouri	3	–	4	–	0	6	–	6	–	0
Iowa State	2	–	4	–	1	5	–	6	–	1
Kansas	2	–	5	–	0	4	–	7	–	0
Kansas State	1	–	6	–	0	3	–	8	–	0
$ – Conference champion; The Big 8 Conference mandated Oklahoma forfeits in three conference games, giving Nebraska the title. Oklahoma reverted this record at a later date; hence, both Oklahoma and Nebraska claim this title.; Rankings from AP Poll

The 1972 Kansas State Wildcats football team represented Kansas State University in the 1972 NCAA University Division football season. The team's head football coach was Vince Gibson. The Wildcats played their home games in KSU Stadium.

== Schedule ==
Date	Opponent	Site	Result	Attendance	Source
September 9	Tulsa*	KSU Stadium; Manhattan, KS	W 21–13	28,000	
September 16	at BYU*	Cougar Stadium; Provo, UT	L 9–32	31,753	
September 23	at No. 10 Arizona State*	Sun Devil Stadium; Tempe, AZ	L 14–56	50,682	
September 30	Tampa*	KSU Stadium; Manhattan, KS	W 31–7	35,000	
October 7	No. 12 Colorado	KSU Stadium; Manhattan, KS (rivalry)	L 17–38	40,000	
October 14	Kansas	KSU Stadium; Manhattan, KS (rivalry)	W 20–19	42,000	
October 21	at No. 20 Iowa State	Clyde Williams Field; Ames, IA (rivalry)	L 22–25	36,231	
October 28	at No. 8 Oklahoma	Oklahoma Memorial Stadium; Norman, OK	L 0–52	61,826	
November 4	No. 16 Missouri	KSU Stadium; Manhattan, KS	L 14–31	37,500	
November 11	Oklahoma State^{†}	KSU Stadium; Manhattan, KS	L 14–45	25,000	
November 18	at No. 5 Nebraska	Memorial Stadium; Lincoln, NE (rivalry)	L 7–59	75,079	
*Non-conference game; ^{†}Homecoming; Rankings from AP Poll released prior to the game

== Roster ==
1972 Kansas State Wildcats football team roster
Players
Coaches
Offense

Pos.	#	Name	Class
OT	76	Del Acker	Sr
TE		Joe Brandt
OT	77	Bill Brittain	Jr
FB	32	Don Calhoun	Jr
TE	83	Henry Childs	Jr
WR	46	Rick Fergerson
WR	47	John Goerger	Sr
QB	11	Steve Grogan	So
RB		Bill Holman
G	69	Larry Hopkins	Jr
RB	25	Isaac Jackson	Jr
TE		Keith Jones
RB		Gust Kumis
WR		John McCarthy
QB	10	Dennis Morrison	Sr
WR		Don Parham
WR	38	Bud Peterson
OT	61	Chuck Price	Jr
C	59	Fred Rothwell
RB		David Specht
OL		Paul Steninger
RB		Leroy Thomas
WR		J Washington
G	74	John Wells	Jr

Defense

Pos.	#	Name	Class
DB	20	Terry Brown	Jr
LB		Gordon Chambliss
DT	75	Charles Clarington	Jr
DB	19	Ron Coppenbarger	Sr
DL		Clayton Ferguson
DL		Gary Glatz
LB	50	Greg Jones	Jr
DB		Donald Lareau
DB	35	Gary Melcher	Sr
DE	86	John O'Neill	Sr
DE	87	Bert Oettmeier	Jr
DB	29	Ron Solt	So
DL		Roger Stucky
LB		Kevin Vohoska

Special teams

Pos.	#	Name	Class
K		Keith Brumley

Head coach

- Vince Gibson

Coordinators/assistant coaches

Legend

- (C) Team captain
- (S) Suspended
- (I) Ineligible
- Injured
- Redshirt
