= 1973 Orange Bowl =

American college football game

- 39th Orange Bowl
- The Miami Orange Bowl in Miami, Florida, hosted the Orange Bowl.
| Notre Dame Fighting Irish | Nebraska Cornhuskers |
| (8–2) | (8–2–1) |
| Independent | Big Eight |
| 6 | 40 |
| Head coach: Ara Parseghian | Head coach: Bob Devaney |
| AP / Coaches; 12 / 12 | AP / Coaches; 9 / 9 |
| | 1 | 2 | 3 | 4 | Total |
|---|---|---|---|---|---|
| Notre Dame | 0 | 0 | 0 | 6 | 6 |
| Nebraska | 7 | 13 | 20 | 0 | 40 |
- Date: January 1, 1973
- Season: 1972
- Stadium: Orange Bowl
- Location: Miami, Florida
- MVP: Johnny Rodgers (Nebraska HB)
- Favorite: Nebraska by 14 points
- Referee: Vance Carlson (Big Eight; split crew: Big Eight, Big Ten)
- Attendance: 80,010

United States TV coverage
- Network: NBC
- Announcers: Jim Simpson and Kyle Rote
- Nielsen ratings: 24.5

The 1973 Orange Bowl was the 39th edition of the college football bowl game, played at the Orange Bowl in Miami, Florida, on Monday, January 1. The final game of the 1972–73 bowl season, it matched the ninth-ranked Nebraska Cornhuskers of the Big Eight Conference and the independent #12 Notre Dame Fighting Irish, led by their respective hall of fame coaches, Bob Devaney and Ara Parseghian.

Two-time defending national champion Nebraska scored early and won 40–6; Notre Dame was held scoreless until the fourth quarter to avoid a shutout.

== Teams ==
=== Notre Dame ===
Notre Dame opened with four wins, but lost by four points to Missouri at home. In the regular season finale, the Irish lost 45–23 at rival USC, the eventual national champion. It was Notre Dame's first appearance in the Orange Bowl.

=== Nebraska ===
The two-time defending national champion Cornhuskers started the season top-ranked, but were upset by a late field goal in the opener, late at night at UCLA. They later tied Iowa State on the road and lost 17–14 to rival Oklahoma at home, their first loss on artificial turf. Nebraska was appearing in their third consecutive Orange Bowl.

== Game summary ==
Ninth-ranked Nebraska was favored by two touchdowns. The programs had last matched up over 24 years earlier, in October 1948.

Heisman Trophy winner Johnny Rodgers scored on an 8-yard touchdown run as Nebraska took the lead. In the second quarter, Gary Dixon scored from a yard out to increase the score to 14–0. I-back Rodgers then found split end Frosty Anderson for a 52-yard touchdown pass and the Huskers led 20–0 at halftime.

In the third quarter, Rodgers scored on runs of four and five yards as Nebraska built a 33–0 lead. Quarterback Dave Humm threw a 50-yard touchdown pass to Rodgers as Nebraska led 40–0 after three quarters. Notre Dame finally managed six points on a touchdown from Tom Clements to Pete Demmerle against the Husker reserves to avoid a shutout.

=== Scoring ===
First quarter

- Nebraska – Johnny Rodgers 8-yard run (Rich Sanger kick), 11:19

Second quarter

- Nebraska – Gary Dixon 1-yard run (Sanger kick), 14:29
- Nebraska – Frosty Anderson 52-yard pass from Rodgers (kick blocked), 12:20

Third quarter

- Nebraska – Rodgers 4-yard run (pass failed), 11:17
- Nebraska – Rodgers 5-yard run (Sanger kick), 7:33
- Nebraska – Rodgers 50-yard pass from David Humm (Sanger kick), 6:00

Fourth quarter

- Notre Dame – Peter Demmerle 5-yard pass from Tom Clements (pass failed), 13:51

== Statistics ==
| Statistics | Notre Dame | Nebraska |
|---|---|---|
| First downs | 13 | 30 |
| Rushes–yards | 44–124 | 64–300 |
| Passing yards | 103 | 260 |
| Passes (C–A–I) | 9–23–3 | 19–26–1 |
| Total offense | 67–227 | 90–560 |
| Punts–average | 6–37.2 | 4–38.3 |
| Fumbles–lost | 3–0 | 1–1 |
| Turnovers | 3 | 2 |
| Penalties–yards | 1–15 | 5–68 |

== Aftermath ==
Although 1972 was a letdown season after two consecutive national championships, the Huskers were the first to three-peat in the Orange Bowl and vaulted to fourth in the final AP poll at 9–2–1. Rodgers scored four touchdowns and threw for another in his final collegiate game, and sat out the final twenty minutes. The final UPI coaches poll was released in early December, prior to the bowls, and had the Huskers ninth.

The 1972 season also was the only three-loss season in Parseghian's eleven years at Notre Dame and they fell to fourteenth in the final AP poll; the Irish rebounded in 1973 to finish 11–0 and win the national championship.
