= 1972 Fiesta Bowl =

American college football game

- 2nd Fiesta Bowl
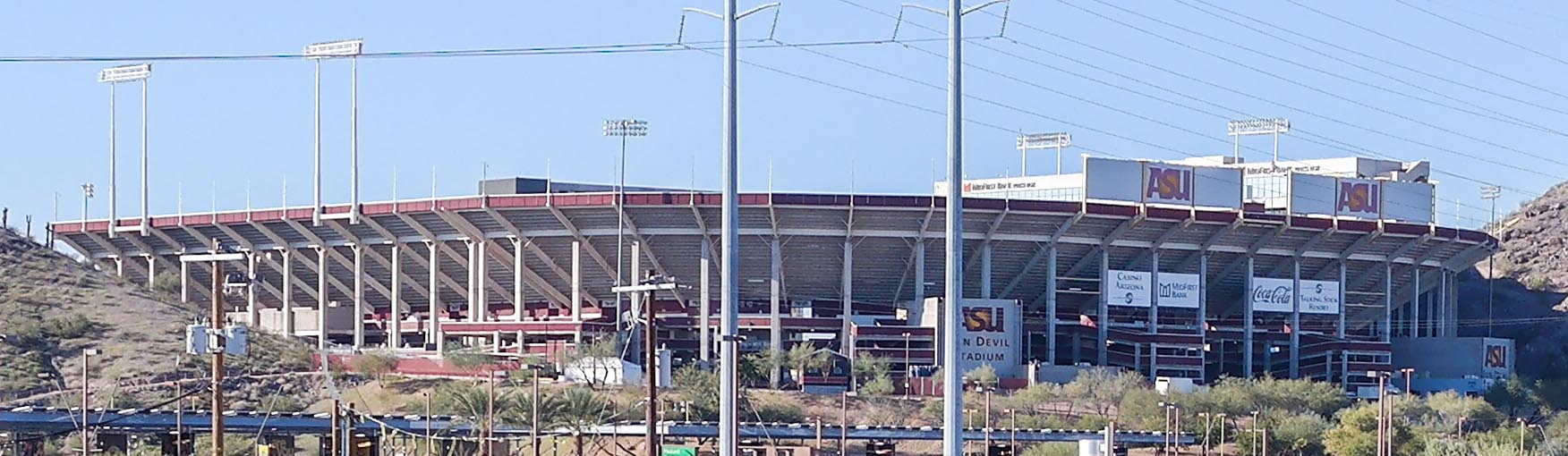
- Sun Devil Stadium in Tempe, Arizona, hosted the Fiesta Bowl.
Missouri Tigers	Arizona State Sun Devils
(6–5)	(9–2)
Big 8	WAC
35	49
Head coach: Al Onofrio	Head coach: Frank Kush
AP / Coaches; NR / NR	AP / Coaches; 15 / 13
	1	2	3	4	Total
Missouri	0	7	14	14	35
Arizona State	14	14	0	21	49
- Date: December 23, 1972
- Season: 1972
- Stadium: Sun Devil Stadium
- Location: Tempe, Arizona
- MVP: Woody Green (ASU HB); Mike Fink (Missouri DB)
- Attendance: 51,138

United States TV coverage
- Network: Hughes
- Announcers: Lindsey Nelson, Eddie Doucette

The 1972 Fiesta Bowl was the second edition of the college football bowl game, played at Sun Devil Stadium in Tempe, Arizona on Saturday, December 23. Part of the 1972–73 bowl game season, it matched the unranked Missouri Tigers of the Big Eight Conference and #15 Arizona State Sun Devils of the Western Athletic Conference (WAC). Arizona State never trailed, gained over 700 yards on offense, and won again on its home field, 49–35.

This was the first of two consecutive Fiesta Bowls played at night.

== Teams ==
=== Missouri ===
The Tigers finished the regular season with a 6–5 overall record, 3–4 in the Big Eight Conference, with upset wins over Notre Dame, Colorado, and Iowa State. This was Missouri's first bowl appearance in three years.

=== Arizona State ===
The Sun Devils were champions of the WAC for the fourth straight year, the only conference loss was by two points at Wyoming in late September. The other blemish was a home loss to independent Air Force. ASU had won the previous year's inaugural Fiesta Bowl.

== Game summary ==
Televised by Hughes, the kickoff on Saturday night was shortly after 6 p.m. MST. It was the only bowl game of the day, played after the first two NFL divisional playoff games.

Arizona State took the lead early with two touchdown runs by All-American halfback Woody Green, taking a 14–0 lead at the end of the first. Missouri fullback Don Johnson scored from a yard out to narrow the lead, but ASU responded with fullback Brent McClanahan's one-yard run, followed by Danny White's 34-yard touchdown pass to split end Ed Beverly to increase the lead to 28–7 at halftime.

Missouri's Chuck Link caught a touchdown pass from quarterback John Cherry to narrow the lead, but the extra point missed, making it only 28–13. Not to be deterred, Link caught another touchdown pass and converted the conversion to make it 28–21 as the third quarter came to a close.

The Sun Devils struck back, as Green scored his third touchdown of the day to make it 35–21. But on the kickoff return, Mike Fink returned it 100 yards to cut the lead back to seven. Beverly caught his second touchdown of the day from White to make it 42–28, and after a failed Missouri drive, Green scored his fourth touchdown to give ASU a commanding 49–28 lead. Tiger halfback Tommy Reamon had 31-yard touchdown run to make the final score 49–35, as ASU won its second straight Fiesta Bowl.

ASU set two records that still stand for most total yards (718) and first downs (33), which helped them win despite four turnovers compared to Missouri's three, which hurt them more. Green ran for 202 yards on 25 carries (8.1 avg.) for four touchdowns and was named Offensive MVP; in addition, backfield mate McClanahan had 171 yards on 26 carries (6.6 avg.) with a touchdown.

=== Scoring ===
First quarter

- Arizona State – Woody Green 2-yard run (Juan Cruz kick)
- Arizona State – Green 12-yard run (Cruz kick)

Second quarter

- Missouri – Don Johnson 1-yard run (Greg Hill kick)
- Arizona State – Brent McClanahan 1-yard run (Cruz kick)
- Arizona State – Ed Beverly 34-yard pass from Danny White (Cruz kick)

Third quarter

- Missouri – Chuck Link 48-yard pass from John Cherry (kick failed)
- Missouri – Link 4-yard pass from Cherry (Link pass from Cherry)

Fourth quarter

- Arizona State – Green 2-yard run (Cruz kick)
- Missouri – Mike Fink 100-yard kickoff return (Hill kick)
- Arizona State – Beverly 53-yard pass from White (Cruz kick)
- Arizona State – Green 21-yard run (Cruz kick)
- Missouri – Tommy Reamon 31-yard run (Hill kick)

== Statistics ==
Statistics	Missouri	Arizona State
First downs	16	33
Yards rushing	44–229	65–452
Yards passing	182	266
Passing	12–27–3	13–24–3
Return yards	61	44
Total Offense	71–411	89–718
Punts–Average	6–37.8	3–43.6
Fumbles–Lost	1–0	2–1
Turnovers	3	4
Penalties–Yards	2–10	6–50

== Aftermath ==
While in the WAC, Arizona State appeared in three more Fiesta Bowls, winning its next two (1973, 1975). Through 2026, Missouri has yet to return to the Fiesta Bowl.
