= 1972 Kansas Jayhawks football team =

American college football season

1972 Kansas Jayhawks football
- Conference: Big Eight Conference
- Record: 4–7 (2–5 Big 8)
- Head coach: Don Fambrough (2nd season)
- Captains: Don Perkins; Pat Ryan
- Home stadium: Memorial Stadium

1972 Big Eight Conference football standings
	Conf.					Overall
Team	W		L		T	W		L		T
No. 2 Oklahoma $	6	–	1	–	0	11	–	1	–	0
No. 4 Nebraska $	5	–	1	–	1	9	–	2	–	1
No. 16 Colorado	4	–	3	–	0	8	–	4	–	0
Oklahoma State	4	–	3	–	0	6	–	5	–	0
Missouri	3	–	4	–	0	6	–	6	–	0
Iowa State	2	–	4	–	1	5	–	6	–	1
Kansas	2	–	5	–	0	4	–	7	–	0
Kansas State	1	–	6	–	0	3	–	8	–	0
$ – Conference champion; The Big 8 Conference mandated Oklahoma forfeits in three conference games, giving Nebraska the title. Oklahoma reverted this record at a later date; hence, both Oklahoma and Nebraska claim this title.; Rankings from AP Poll

The 1972 Kansas Jayhawks football team represented the University of Kansas in the Big Eight Conference during the 1972 NCAA University Division football season. In their second season under head coach Don Fambrough, the Jayhawks compiled a 4–7 record (2–5 against conference opponents), finished in seventh place in the conference, and were outscored by opponents by a combined total of 305 to 208. They played their home games at Memorial Stadium in Lawrence, Kansas.

The team's statistical leaders included David Jaynes with 2,253 passing yards, Jerome Nellums with 684 rushing yards and Bruce Adams with 704 receiving yards. Don Perkins and Pat Ryan were the team captains.

Three weeks before the season opener, the Jayhawks were banned from a bowl game and live television when the NCAA placed the university on probation for one year after it was discovered former assistant football coach DIck Tomey (who left KU with Pepper Rodgers when the latter was named head coach at UCLA in 1971) certified two prospective student-athletes from Washington as academically eligible under NCAA rules on the basis of falsified high school transcripts. Compliance director John Novotny realized the transcripts were doctored, but he did not take action upon discovery. KU's basketball and athletics programs received the same punishment.

== Schedule ==
Date	Opponent	Site	Result	Attendance	Source
September 9	Washington State*	Memorial Stadium; Lawrence, KS	L 17–18	33,500	
September 23	Wyoming*	Memorial Stadium; Lawrence, KS	W 52–14	40,108	
September 30	No. 16 Florida State*	Memorial Stadium; Lawrence, KS	L 22–44	41,500	
October 7	at Minnesota*	Memorial Stadium; Minneapolis, MN	W 34–28	31,595	
October 14	at Kansas State	KSU Stadium; Manhattan, KS (rivalry)	L 19–20	42,000	
October 21	No. 5 Nebraska	Memorial Stadium; Lawrence, KS (rivalry)	L 0–56	50,500	
October 28	No. 15 Iowa State^{†}	Memorial Stadium; Lawrence, KS	L 8–34	37,250	
November 4	at Oklahoma State	Lewis Field; Stillwater, OK	W 13–10	35,600	
November 11	at No. 16 Colorado	Folsom Field; Boulder, CO	L 8–33	50,304	
November 18	No. 4 Oklahoma	Memorial Stadium; Lawrence, KS	L 7–31	43,350	
November 25	at No. 16 Missouri	Faurot Field; Columbia, MO (Border War)	W 28–17	46,000	
*Non-conference game; ^{†}Homecoming; Rankings from AP Poll released prior to the game
