= Al Onofrio =

American football player and coach (1921–2004)

Biographical details
- Born: March 15, 1921; Culver City, California, U.S.
- Died: November 5, 2004 (aged 83); Tempe, Arizona, U.S.

Playing career
- 1941–1942: Arizona State
- Position: Halfback

Coaching career (HC unless noted)
- 1946–1950: Arizona State (assistant)
- 1955–1957: Arizona State (assistant)
- 1958–1970: Missouri (assistant)
- 1971–1977: Missouri

Head coaching record
- Overall: 38–41
- Bowls: 1–1

Accomplishments and honors

Awards
- Big Eight Coach of the Year (1972)

Albert Joseph Onofrio (March 15, 1921 – November 5, 2004) was an American college football player and coach. He served as the head football coach at the University of Missouri from 1971 to 1977, compiling a record of 38–41. He spent 13 years, from 1958 to 1970, as an assistant coach at Missouri under Dan Devine. His Missouri football teams upset the Notre Dame Fighting Irish on October 21, 1972, at South Bend, Indiana, the Alabama Crimson Tide on September 8, 1975, at Birmingham, the USC Trojans at Los Angeles on September 11, 1976, the Ohio State Buckeyes at Columbus two weeks later, and the Arizona State Sun Devils at Tempe on October 1, 1977, during his final season at Missouri. In his seven years at Mizzou, Onofrio compiled a 1–6 record against arch-rival Kansas, which contributed to his dismissal.

Onofrio coached four All-Americans and 30 future National Football League players. He led Missouri to two bowl games, the 1972 Fiesta Bowl, a loss to Arizona State, and the 1973 Sun Bowl, a win over Auburn.

Onofrio was a 1993 inductee to the Missouri Intercollegiate Athletic Hall of Fame. He died on November 5, 2004, in Tempe, Arizona.

== Early life and education ==
Onofrio received a bachelor and masters degree from Arizona State University where he was the president of the student body and named all conference halfback in football. Onofrio served in the Navy from 1943 to 1946 during World War II. He was a gunnery and executive officer on the LCTR-464 and participated in the bombardment of Omaha Beach on D-Day during the invasion of Normandy.

== Head coaching record ==
Year	Team	Overall	Conference	Standing	Bowl/playoffs	Coaches^{#}	AP^{°}
Missouri Tigers (Big Eight Conference) (1971–1977)
1971	Missouri	1–10	0–7	8th			
1972	Missouri	6–6	3–4	5th	L Fiesta		
1973	Missouri	8–4	3–4	4th	W Sun		17
1974	Missouri	7–4	5–2	T–2nd			
1975	Missouri	6–5	3–4	T–5th			
1976	Missouri	6–5	3–4	6th			
1977	Missouri	4–7	3–4	5th			
Missouri:		38–41	20–29				
Total:		38–41					
^{#}Rankings from final Coaches Poll.; ^{°}Rankings from final AP Poll.
