= 1972 Oklahoma Sooners football team =

American college football season

1972 Oklahoma Sooners football
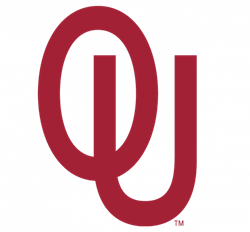

Big 8 co-champion Sugar Bowl champion

Sugar Bowl, W 14–0 vs. Penn State
- Conference: Big Eight Conference

Ranking
- Coaches: No. 2
- AP: No. 2
- Record: 11–1 (6–1 or 3–4 Big 8)
- Head coach: Chuck Fairbanks (6th season)
- Offensive coordinator: Barry Switzer (7th season)
- Offensive scheme: Wishbone
- Defensive coordinator: Larry Lacewell (3rd season)
- Base defense: 5–2
- Captains: Tom Brahaney; Greg Pruitt
- Home stadium: Oklahoma Memorial Stadium

1972 Big Eight Conference football standings
	Conf.					Overall
Team	W		L		T	W		L		T
No. 2 Oklahoma $	6	–	1	–	0	11	–	1	–	0
No. 4 Nebraska $	5	–	1	–	1	9	–	2	–	1
No. 16 Colorado	4	–	3	–	0	8	–	4	–	0
Oklahoma State	4	–	3	–	0	6	–	5	–	0
Missouri	3	–	4	–	0	6	–	6	–	0
Iowa State	2	–	4	–	1	5	–	6	–	1
Kansas	2	–	5	–	0	4	–	7	–	0
Kansas State	1	–	6	–	0	3	–	8	–	0
$ – Conference champion; The Big 8 Conference mandated Oklahoma forfeits in three conference games, giving Nebraska the title. Oklahoma reverted this record at a later date; hence, both Oklahoma and Nebraska claim this title.; Rankings from AP Poll

The 1972 Oklahoma Sooners football team represented the University of Oklahoma in the 1972 NCAA University Division football season. Oklahoma was a member of the Big Eight Conference and played its home games in Oklahoma Memorial Stadium, where it has played its home games since 1923. The team posted an 11–1 overall record and were 6–1 in conference, later changed to 8–4 and 3–4. This was Chuck Fairbanks' last season as Sooner head coach; he left for the New England Patriots of the NFL.

The Sooners' 1972 record is marred by the use of an ineligible player. In self-reporting the violations to the NCAA, Oklahoma voluntarily forfeited eight games. The NCAA later penalized the program by reducing scholarships, TV appearances and bowl appearances. In 2008 a blogger for Washington, DC TV station WJLA stated, "The NCAA claims that according to a now-retired statistician of the era, and a review of its database (which the NCAA admits might not be totally complete) that forfeits were NOT [sic] part of the NCAA sanctions levied against the Sooners." A commenter stated, "The 1972 forfeits by Oklahoma were sanctioned by The Big Eight. As such Oklahoma's conference record was adjusted, while their overall record was not. In older Oklahoma media guide ... Oklahoma would show their record as 11–1 with a 3–4 conference record (reflecting 3 forfeits, despite the original 7 or 8 forfeited. ...) Also, if you check the media guides of the teams Oklahoma "forfeited" to, Missouri, Kansas and Oklahoma State, you'll not[e] similar adjustments. Each team didn't change their overall record, but changed their conference record." Oklahoma had used players (including Kerry Jackson, the team's first black quarterback) with falsified transcripts and on April 18, 1973, voluntarily forfeited eight games. Eventually, the Big Eight sanctioned the forfeit of three conference victories (Missouri, Kansas, and Oklahoma State), but Oklahoma now recognizes these as wins and claims the 1972 conference title.

Oklahoma was led by four All-Americans: Rod Shoate (OU's second three-time All-American), Greg Pruitt, Tom Brahaney and Derland Moore. This was the first season that the Selmon brothers Lucious, Lee Roy and Dewey, all eventual All-Americans, anchored the defensive line. The Sooners played seven ranked opponents (In order, #10 Texas, #9 Colorado, #14 Iowa State, #14 Missouri, #5 Nebraska, #20 Oklahoma State, and #5 Penn State), and four of these opponents finished the season ranked. Oklahoma's only loss on the field was in the fifth game against Colorado. The team concluded its season with a 14–0 victory over Penn State in the Sugar Bowl on New Year's Eve.

Pruitt led the Sooners in rushing with 1024 yards, Dave Robertson led in passing with 1136 yards, and Tinker Owens led in receiving (for the first of four consecutive seasons) with 430 yards. Pruitt led in scoring with 86 points, Shoate in tackles with 145, and Dan Ruster in interceptions with seven.

The 1972 Sooners twice posted 37 first downs, which was a school record that stood for 16 seasons.

== Schedule ==
Date	Opponent	Rank	Site	TV	Result	Attendance	Source
September 16	Utah State*	No. 4	Oklahoma Memorial Stadium; Norman OK		W 49–0	61,826	
September 23	Oregon*	No. 2	Oklahoma Memorial Stadium; Norman, OK		W 68–3	61,862–62,240	
September 30	Clemson*	No. 2	Oklahoma Memorial Stadium; Norman, OK		W 52–3	61,210–61,826	
October 14	vs. No. 10 Texas*	No. 2	Cotton Bowl; Dallas, TX (Red River Shootout)	ABC	W 27–0	72,030	
October 21	at No. 9 Colorado	No. 2	Folsom Field; Boulder, CO	ABC	L 14–20	52,022	
October 28	Kansas State	No. 8	Oklahoma Memorial Stadium; Norman, OK		W 52–0	61,826	
November 4	at No. 14 Iowa State	No. 7	Clyde Williams Field; Ames, IA		W 20–6	36,231	
November 11	No. 14 Missouri	No. 7	Oklahoma Memorial Stadium; Norman, OK (rivalry)		W 17–6	61,826	
November 18	at Kansas	No. 4	Memorial Stadium; Lawrence, KS		W 31–7	43,350	
November 23	at No. 5 Nebraska	No. 4	Memorial Stadium; Lincoln, NE (rivalry)	ABC	W 17–14	76,587	
December 2	No. 20 Oklahoma State	No. 3	Oklahoma Memorial Stadium; Norman, OK (Bedlam Series)		W 38–15	61,826	
December 31	vs. No. 5 Penn State*	No. 2	Tulane Stadium; New Orleans, LA (Sugar Bowl)	ABC	W 14–0	80,123	
*Non-conference game; Rankings from AP Poll released prior to the game; Source:

== Game summaries ==
=== Utah State ===
Team	1	2	3	4	Total
Utah St	0	0	0	0	0
• Oklahoma	21	7	14	7	49

- Date: September 16
- Location: Oklahoma Memorial Stadium
- Game attendance: 62,546

Scoring summary
Q1	OKLA	Carroll 44 yard pass from Robertson (Carroll kick)	OKLA 7–0
Q1	OKLA	Pruitt 5 yard run (Carroll kick)	OKLA 14–0
Q1	OKLA	Burgel 1 yard run (Carroll kick)	OKLA 21–0
Q2	OKLA	Pruitt 1 yard run (Carroll kick)	OKLA 28–0
Q3	OKLA	Pruitt 4 yard run (Carroll kick)	OKLA 35–0
Q3	OKLA	Wylie 12 yard run (Carroll kick)	OKLA 42–0
Q4	OKLA	Washington 1 yard run (Carroll kick)	OKLA 49–0

- Kerry Jackson 10 Rush, 109 Yds

=== Oregon ===
Team	1	2	3	4	Total
Oregon	0	0	0	3	3
• Oklahoma	14	21	26	7	68

- Date: September 23
- Location: Oklahoma Memorial Stadium
- Game attendance: 62,240
- Greg Pruitt 11 Rush, 103 Yds, TD

=== Clemson ===
#2 Oklahoma Sooners vs. Clemson Tigers

Team	1	2	3	4	Total
Clemson	0	0	0	3	3
• #2 Oklahoma	7	17	21	7	52

- Date: September 30
- Location: Oklahoma Memorial Stadium, Norman, Oklahoma

Scoring summary
1	OU	Greg Pruitt 5-yard run (Rick Fulcher kick)	OU 7-0
2	OU	Robertson 1-yard run (Rick Fulcher kick)	OU 14-0
2	OU	Greg Pruitt 4-yard run (Rick Fulcher kick)	OU 21-0
2	OU	Rick Fulcher 32-yard field goal	OU 24-0
3	OU	Robertson 4-yard run (Rick Fulcher kick)	OU 31-0
3	OU	Greg Pruitt 1-yard run (Rick Fulcher kick)	OU 38-0
3	OU	Joe Washington 61-yard run (Rick Fulcher kick)	OU 45-0
4	OU	Powers 57-yard fumble return (Rick Fulcher kick)	OU 52-0
4	CLEM	Seigler 49-yard field goal	OU 52-3

- Tim Welch 24 Rush, 158 Yds

=== At Kansas ===
#4 Oklahoma Sooners at Kansas Jayhawks

Team	1	2	3	4	Total
• #4 Oklahoma	7	10	14	0	31
Kansas	0	0	7	0	7

- Date: November 18
- Location: Memorial Stadium, Lawrence, Kansas
- Game attendance: 43,350

Scoring summary
1	Oklahoma	Robertson 3-yard run (Fulcher kick)	Oklahoma 7-0
2	Oklahoma	Crosswhite 6-yard run (Fulcher kick)	Oklahoma 14-0
2	Oklahoma	Fulcher 35-yard field goal	Oklahoma 17-0
3	Kansas	Schroll 49-yard pass from Jaynes (Helbacher kick)	Oklahoma 17-7
3	Oklahoma	Wylie 2-yard run (Fulcher kick)	Oklahoma 24-7
3	Oklahoma	Carroll 24-yard pass from Robertson (Fulcher kick)	Oklahoma 31-7

=== Oklahoma State ===
Team	1	2	3	4	Total
Oklahoma St	0	0	9	6	15
• Oklahoma	14	10	0	14	38

- Date: December 2
- Location: Oklahoma Memorial Stadium
- Game attendance: 62,363
- Joe Washington 21 Rush, 109 Yds, 2 TD
- Leon Crosswhite 27 Rush, 106 Yds

=== Sugar Bowl (vs Penn State) ===
	1	2	3	4	Total
Oklahoma	7	0	7	0	14
Penn St	0	0	0	0	0

- Attendance: 84,031 (Tulane Stadium)
- OU Owens 27 yd pass from Robertson (Fulcher kick)
- OU Crosswhite 1 yd run (Fulcher kick)
- Passing: OU Robertson 3/6, 88 Yds, TD, PSU Hufnagel 12/31, 147 Yds, INT
- Rushing: OU Pruitt 21/86, PSU Nagle 10/22
- Receiving: OU Owens 5/132, TD, PSU Scott 3/59

== Rankings ==
Ranking movements Legend: ██ Increase in ranking ██ Decrease in ranking ( ) = First-place votes
	Week														
Poll	Pre	1	2	3	4	5	6	7	8	9	10	11	12	13	Final
AP	6 (2)	4 (12)	2 (11)	2 (14)	2 (13)	2 (15)	2 (20)	8	7	8	4	4	3	2	2
UPI	3 (2)	1 (11)	2 (13)	2 (12)	2 (11)	2 (13)	2 (12)	2 (8)	6	7	4	4	3	2	2

== Roster ==
1972 Oklahoma Sooners football team roster
Players
Coaches
Offense

Pos.	#	Name	Class
OT	63	Neil Acker	Jr
SE	8	Steve Allen	So
OT	73	Drake Andarakes	So
FB	1	Bill Anderson	So
OT	74	Jerry Arnold	So
C	54	Tom Brahaney	Sr
OE	82	Al Chandler	Sr
FB	17	Leon Crosswhite	Sr
G	69	John McLaughlin	Jr
TE	85	Mike McLaughlin	Jr
SE	11	Tinker Owens	Fr
HB	34	Greg Pruitt	Sr
QB	15	Dave Robertson	Sr
HB	24	Joe Washington	Fr
G	60	Dean Unruh	Sr
HB/P	22	Joe Wylie	Sr

Defense

Pos.	#	Name	Class
LB	41	Gary Gibbs	So
DE	96	Ray Hamilton	Sr
DT	97	Derland Moore	Sr
DT	98	Lucious Selmon	Jr

Special teams

Pos.	#	Name	Class
K	10	John Carroll	Sr

Head coach

- Chuck Fairbanks

Coordinators/assistant coaches

- Galen Hall (WR)
- Warren Harper (LB)
- Gene Hochevar
- Jimmy Johnson (DL)
- Larry Lacewell (DC)
- Bill Michael (OL)
- Wendell Mosley (RB)
- Jerry Pettibone
- Barry Switzer (OC)

Legend

- (C) Team captain
- (S) Suspended
- (I) Ineligible
- Injured
- Redshirt

Roster

== Awards and honors ==
- All-American: Greg Pruitt, Rod Shoate, Tom Brahaney and Derland Moore

== After the season ==
=== NFL draft ===
The following players were drafted into the National Football League following the season.

Round	Pick	Player	Position	NFL team
2	29	Derland Moore	Defensive end	New Orleans Saints
2	30	Greg Pruitt	Running back	Cleveland Browns
2	43	Al Chandler	Tight end	Cincinnati Bengals
2	44	Leon Crosswhite	Running back	Detroit Lions
4	101	Joe Wylie	Wide receiver	Oakland Raiders
5	109	Tom Brahaney	Center	St. Louis Cardinals
7	164	Ken Jones	Tackle	St. Louis Cardinals
10	238	Dan Ruster	Defensive back	New England Patriots
12	292	Dean Unruh	Tackle	St. Louis Cardinals
14	342	Ray Hamilton	Linebacker	New England Patriots
17	424	Larry Roach	Defensive back	Chicago Bears
