= 1972 Oklahoma State Cowboys football team =

American college football season

1972 Oklahoma State Cowboys football
- Conference: Big Eight Conference
- Record: 6–5 (4–3 Big 8)
- Head coach: Dave Smith (1st season)
- Home stadium: Lewis Field

1972 Big Eight Conference football standings
	Conf.					Overall
Team	W		L		T	W		L		T
No. 2 Oklahoma $	6	–	1	–	0	11	–	1	–	0
No. 4 Nebraska $	5	–	1	–	1	9	–	2	–	1
No. 16 Colorado	4	–	3	–	0	8	–	4	–	0
Oklahoma State	4	–	3	–	0	6	–	5	–	0
Missouri	3	–	4	–	0	6	–	6	–	0
Iowa State	2	–	4	–	1	5	–	6	–	1
Kansas	2	–	5	–	0	4	–	7	–	0
Kansas State	1	–	6	–	0	3	–	8	–	0
$ – Conference champion; The Big 8 Conference mandated Oklahoma forfeits in three conference games, giving Nebraska the title. Oklahoma reverted this record at a later date; hence, both Oklahoma and Nebraska claim this title.; Rankings from AP Poll

The 1972 Oklahoma State Cowboys football team represented Oklahoma State University in the Big Eight Conference during the 1972 NCAA University Division football season. In their first and only season under head coach Dave Smith, the Cowboys compiled a 6–5 record (4–3 against conference opponents), tied for third place in the conference, and outscored opponents by a combined total of 259 to 203.

The team's statistical leaders included George Palmer with 937 rushing yards, Brent Blackman with 572 passing yards, Steve Pettes with 154 receiving yards, and Alton Gerard with 42 points scored.

The team played its home games at Lewis Field in Stillwater, Oklahoma.

== Schedule ==
Date	Opponent	Rank	Site	Result	Attendance	Source
September 16	UT Arlington		Lewis Field; Stillwater, OK	W 21–3	31,500	
September 23	at Arkansas*		War Memorial Stadium; Little Rock, AR	L 23–24	54,431	
September 30	No. 3 Colorado		Lewis Field; Stillwater, OK	W 31–6	38,500	
October 7	Missouri		Lewis Field; Stillwater, OK	W 17–16	38,000	
October 14	at Virginia Tech*	No. 19	Lane Stadium; Blacksburg, VA	L 32–34	36,000	
October 21	Baylor*^{†}		Lewis Field; Stillwater, OK	W 20–7	39,000	
October 28	at No. 3 Nebraska		Memorial Stadium; Lincoln, NE	L 0–34	76,432	
November 4	Kansas		Lewis Field; Stillwater, OK	L 10–13	35,600	
November 11	at Kansas State		KSU Stadium; Manhattan, KS	W 45–14	25,000	
November 25	No. 17 Iowa State		Lewis Field; Stillwater, OK	W 45–14	22,500	
December 2	at No. 3 Oklahoma	No. 20	Oklahoma Memorial Stadium; Norman, OK (Bedlam Series)	L 15–38	61,826	
*Non-conference game; ^{†}Homecoming; Rankings from AP Poll released prior to the game

== Roster ==
1972 Oklahoma State Cowboys football team roster
Players
Coaches
Offense

Pos.	#	Name	Class
TE	82	Charlie Beall	Sr
QB	10	Brent Blackman	Jr
G	75	Bon Boatwright	Jr
OT	61	Mike Clendennen	Jr
TE	85	Reuben Gant	Jr
C	52	Bert Jacobson	Sr
RB	35	George Palmer	So
WR	81	Steve Pettes	Jr
WR	18	David Rosenthal	Jr
OT	77	Tom Wolf	So
G	64	Pat Yates	Sr

Defense

Pos.	#	Name	Class
LB	54	Bobby Bacon	Jr
LB	62	Bubba Bain	Sr
DT	68	Gill Barnes	Sr
FS	36	Alvin Brown	Jr
DT	65	Barry Price	Jr
DE	93	Glenn Robinson	Jr
CB	28	Darryl Stewart	Jr
CB	34	Mike Terry	So
DE	94	Doug Tarrant	Jr
LB	60	Cleveland Vann	Jr
DT	72	Jimmy Williams	Jr

Special teams

Pos.	#	Name	Class

Head coach

- Hayden Fry

Coordinators/assistant coaches

Legend

- (C) Team captain
- (S) Suspended
- (I) Ineligible
- Injured
- Redshirt
