= George Haffner =

American football player and coach

Biographical details
- Born: Chicago, Illinois, U.S.

Playing career
- 1959–1960: Notre Dame
- 1964: McNeese State
- Position: Quarterback

Coaching career (HC unless noted)
- 1969–1970: Iowa State (QB)
- 1971–1972: Iowa State (OC)
- 1973–1975: Pittsburgh (OC)
- 1976–1978: Florida State (OC)
- 1979: Texas A&M (OC)
- 1980–1990: Georgia (OC)
- 1991–1992: LSU (OC)
- 1993: UNLV (OC)
- 1994–1998: Northeast Louisiana (QB)
- 1999–2005: Mary Hardin–Baylor (OC)

George Haffner is an American former football player and coach.

Born in Chicago, Haffner prepped at football powerhouse Mount Carmel High School. While at the University of Notre Dame in 1960, Haffner was awarded the starting quarterback job by head coach Joe Kuharich. His first game was an impressive 21–17 victory over California. However, the team finished the season with 2–8 record, and after losing the starting job to Daryle Lamonica, Haffner transferred to McNeese State University.

Following his graduation, Haffner was selected by the Baltimore Colts in the 20th round with the final pick in the 1965 NFL draft. His professional career ended with the Norfolk Neptunes of the Continental Football League, after which he returned to the college ranks as a coach.

Haffner spent 31 years on various coaching staffs at NCAA Division I schools including 22 years as an offensive coordinator under such renowned head coaches as Bobby Bowden, Johnny Majors and Vince Dooley. While at the University of Georgia, he won a national championship and three conference championships and coached Heisman Trophy winner Herschel Walker. During his career, he coached at Iowa State University, the University of Pittsburgh, Florida State University, Texas A&M University, Georgia, Louisiana State University (LSU), the University of Nevada, Las Vegas (UNLV), and the University of Mary Hardin–Baylor. He retired as the offensive coordinator for Mary Hardin–Baylor on February 1, 2006.
