= 1972 Nebraska Cornhuskers football team =

American college football season

1972 Nebraska Cornhuskers football

Big 8 co-champion Orange Bowl champion

Orange Bowl, W 40–6 vs. Notre Dame
- Conference: Big Eight Conference

Ranking
- Coaches: No. 9
- AP: No. 4
- Record: 9–2–1 (5–1–1 Big Eight)
- Head coach: Bob Devaney (11th season)
- Offensive coordinator: Tom Osborne (4th season)
- Offensive scheme: I formation
- Defensive coordinator: Monte Kiffin (4th season)
- Base defense: 5–2
- Home stadium: Memorial Stadium

1972 Big Eight Conference football standings
	Conf.					Overall
Team	W		L		T	W		L		T
No. 2 Oklahoma $	6	–	1	–	0	11	–	1	–	0
No. 4 Nebraska $	5	–	1	–	1	9	–	2	–	1
No. 16 Colorado	4	–	3	–	0	8	–	4	–	0
Oklahoma State	4	–	3	–	0	6	–	5	–	0
Missouri	3	–	4	–	0	6	–	6	–	0
Iowa State	2	–	4	–	1	5	–	6	–	1
Kansas	2	–	5	–	0	4	–	7	–	0
Kansas State	1	–	6	–	0	3	–	8	–	0
$ – Conference champion; The Big 8 Conference mandated Oklahoma forfeits in three conference games, giving Nebraska the title. Oklahoma reverted this record at a later date; hence, both Oklahoma and Nebraska claim this title.; Rankings from AP Poll

The 1972 Nebraska Cornhuskers football team represented the University of Nebraska–Lincoln in the 1972 NCAA University Division football season. The team was coached by Bob Devaney, in his eleventh and final season with the Huskers, and played their home games in Memorial Stadium in Lincoln.

Nebraska, national champions in 1970 and 1971, entered the season top-ranked in the polls, with a 23-game winning streak and a 32-game unbeaten streak.

== Schedule ==
Date	Time	Opponent	Rank	Site	TV	Result	Attendance	Source
September 9	10:05 pm	at UCLA*	No. 1	Los Angeles Memorial Coliseum; Los Angeles, CA		L 17–20	67,702	
September 16	1:30 pm	Texas A&M*	No. 10	Memorial Stadium; Lincoln, NE		W 37–7	76,042	
September 23	12:58 pm	at Army*	No. 9	Michie Stadium; West Point, NY	ABC	W 77–7	42,239	
September 30	1:30 pm	Minnesota*	No. 7	Memorial Stadium; Lincoln, NE (rivalry)		W 49–0	76,217	
October 14	1:30 pm	Missouri	No. 6	Memorial Stadium; Lincoln, NE (rivalry)		W 62–0	76,511	
October 21	1:30 pm	at Kansas	No. 5	Memorial Stadium; Lawrence, KS (rivalry)		W 56–0	50,500	
October 28	1:30 pm	Oklahoma State^{†}	No. 3	Memorial Stadium; Lincoln, NE		W 34–0	76,432	
November 4	1:20 pm	at No. 15 Colorado	No. 3	Folsom Field; Boulder, CO (rivalry)	ABC	W 33–10	52,128	
November 11	1:30 pm	at No. 17 Iowa State	No. 3	Clyde Williams Field; Ames, IA (rivalry)		T 23–23	36,231	
November 18	1:30 pm	Kansas State	No. 5	Memorial Stadium; Lincoln, NE (rivalry)		W 59–7	75,079	
November 23	1:20 pm	No. 4 Oklahoma	No. 5	Memorial Stadium; Lincoln, NE (rivalry)	ABC	L 14–17	76,587	
January 1, 1973	7:00 pm	vs. No. 12 Notre Dame*	No. 9	Miami Orange Bowl; Miami, FL (Orange Bowl, rivalry)	NBC	W 40–6	80,010	
*Non-conference game; ^{†}Homecoming; Rankings from AP Poll released prior to the game; All times are in Central time

== Roster ==
Alward, Tom #63 (So.) LG; Anderson, Bill #97 (So.) MG; Anderson, Dan #67 (Jr.) RG; Anderson, Frosty #89 (Jr.) SE; Austin, Al #78 (Jr.) RT; Bahe, Ritch #24 (So.) WB; Bell, John #66 (Jr.) MG; Beran, Mike #62 (Sr.) RG; Blahak, Joe #27 (Sr.) LCB; Borg, Randy #19 (Jr.) RCB; Branch, Jim #51 (Sr.) LB; Butts, Randy #36 (Jr.) IB; Carstens, Jim #47 (Sr.) FB; Coleman, Ron #9 (So.) TE; Costanzo, Rich #77 (So.) RT; Crenshaw, Marvin #70 (So.) RT; Damkroger, Maury #46 (Jr.) FB; Davis, Tony #26 (So.) IB; DeNell, Jake #6 (So.) RCB; Dixon, Gary #22 (Sr.) IB; Doak, Mark #71 (So.) LT; Drinkwalter, Bob #92 (So.) RG; Duda, Rich #50 (So.) C Dumler, Doug #54 (Sr.) C Dutton, John #90 (Jr.) DT; Fischer, Pat #33 (Jr.) LCB; Fuller, Bruce #5 (So.) LCB; Garson, Glen #39 (Jr.) WB; Glover, Rich #79 (Sr.) MG; Goeller, Dave #28 (Jr.) IB; Harper, Willie #81 (Sr.) DE; Hegener, Stan #64 (So.) RG; Henrichs, Dennis #75 (So.) LT	Heydorff, Mark #2 (Jr.) S Hill, Jeff #8 (So.) SE; Humm, Dave #12 (So.) QB; Humm, Tom #32 (So.) WB; Hunter, Ken #78 (So.) MG; Hyland, John #58 (Sr.) DE; Janssen, Bill #55 (Sr.) DT; Jenkins, Brad #87 (So.) SE; Johnson, Ardell #29 (So.) RCB; Johnson, Monte #37 (Sr.) DT; Jones, Chuck #35 (So.) LCB; Kinsel, John #53 (Sr.) C Knudsen, Tom #73 (Jr.) MG; Kyros, George #18 (So.) S Lackovic, Tim #80 (So.) SE; Leonardi, Chad #61 (So.) LG; List, Jerry #85 (Sr.) TE; Loewenstein, Ron #4 (So.) MON; Longwell, Brent #86 (Jr.) TE; Luck, Terry #11 (So.) QB; Lynch, Dan #96 (So.) DT; Manstedt, Steve #82 (Jr.) DE; Mason, Dave #25 (Sr.) MON; Mazon, Frank #31 (So.) RCB; McGuire, Tim #93 (So.) LG; McKinley, Kim #65 (So.) DT; Meyer, Bob #98 (So.) DE; Mills, George #69 (So.) DT; Moran, Jeff #30 (So.) WB; Mushinskie, Larry #88 (So.) TE; Nelson, Bob #57 (So.) LB; Norrie, Rod #94 (So.) DT; O'Connell, John #34 (Jr.) S Offner, Mike #95 (So.) DE	O'Holleran, Mike #38 (So.) FB; Olds, Bill #44 (Sr.) FB; Osborne, Mike #99 (So.) DT; Pate, Tom #68 (So.) DE; Peterson, Matt #7 (So.) SE; Pitts, John #56 (Sr.) LB; Potter, Dana #10 (So.) QB; Powell, Ralph #41 (Jr.) FB; Redding, Dave #91 (So.) DE; Revelle, Bob #84 (So.) SE; Righetti, Phil #74 (Sr.) LT; Rodgers, Johnny #20 (Sr.) WB; Rogers, Terry #40 (So.) MON; Runty, Steve #13 (Jr.) QB; Rutan, Bob #15 (So.) QB; Ruud, Tom #45 (So.) LB; Sanger, Rich #43 (Jr.) P/PK; Schmit, Bob #23 (Jr.) LB; Seeton, Jim #16 (So.) S Sloey, Bill #42 (Sr.) LB; Starkebaum, John #48 (So.) MON; Stinner, John #3 (Jr.) LB; Strong, Jon #49 (Jr.) LB; Thornton, Bob #17 (Jr.) S Westbrook, Don #21 (So.) IB; White, Daryl #72 (Jr.) LT; Wieser, Steve #83 (So.) DE; Wolfe, Bob #76 (Jr.) LG; Yaralian, Zaven #1 (Jr.) RCB; Young, Vic #52 (So.) C Zanrosso, Dennis #59 (Jr.) C

=== Depth chart ===
Defense

FS
George Kyros
Bob Thornton
Jim Seeton

INSDIE	INSDIE
John Pitts	Jim Branch
Tom Ruud	Bob Nelson
Bob Schmit	Bill Sloey

MONSTER BACK
Dave Mason
John Starkebuam
Terry Rogers

CB
Joe Blahak
Chuck Jones
Pat Fischer

DE	DT	NT	DT	DE
Willie Harper	John Dutton	Rich Glover	Monte Johnson	Steve Manstedt
Tom Pate	Bill Janssen	John Bell	Rod Norrie	John Hyland
Dave Redding	George Mills	Tom Knudsen	Kim McKinley	Steve Wieser

CB
Randy Borg
Zaven Yaralian
Adrell Johnson

Offense

SE
Bob Revelle
Frosty Anderson
Jeff Hill

LT	LG	C	RG	RT
Daryl White	Bob Wolfe (injured); Dan Anderson	Doug Dumler	Mike Beran	Marvin Crenshaw
Mark Doak	Tom Alward	John Kinsel	Dan Anderson	Al Austin
Dennis Henrichs	Chad Leonardi	Rich Duda	Stan Hegener	Rich Costanzo

TE
Jerry List
Brent Longwell
Larry Mushinskie

WB
Johnny Rodgers
Glen Garson
Ritch Bahe

QB
Dave Humm
Steve Runty
Terry Luck

Key reserves

FB
Bill Olds
Maury Damkroger
Ralph Powell

Special teams

RB
Gary Dixon
Johnny Rodgers
Dave Goeller
Jeff Moran

== Coaching staff ==
Name	Title	First year in this position	Years at Nebraska	Alma mater
Bob Devaney	Head Coach	1962	1962–72	Alma
Tom Osborne	Offensive coordinator	1969	1964–97	Hastings
Cletus Fischer	Offensive Line	1960	1960–85	Nebraska
Carl Selmer	Offensive Line	1962	1962–72	
Jim Ross			1962–76	
John Melton	Tight Ends, Wingbacks	1973	1962–88	Wyoming
Mike Corgan	Running Backs	1962	1962–82	Notre Dame
Monte Kiffin	Defensive coordinator	1969	1967–76	Nebraska
Warren Powers	Defensive Backs	1969	1969–76	Nebraska
Boyd Epley	Head Strength Coach	1969	1969–2003	Nebraska
Jim Walden		1971	1971–72	Wyoming
Bill Myles	Offensive Line	1972	1972–76	Drake University

== Game summaries ==
=== UCLA ===
#1 Nebraska at UCLA [box score]

Team	1	2	3	4	Total
#1 Nebraska	0	10	0	7	17
• UCLA	3	7	7	3	20

- Date: 1972-09-09
- Location: Los Angeles Memorial Coliseum,
  Los Angeles, California
- Game attendance: 67,702

Unranked UCLA, sporting their new wishbone offense led by junior college transfer Mark Harmon, handed #1 Nebraska its first loss in 33 games, and broke Nebraska's 23-game winning streak, both at that time active NCAA records. The Cornhuskers were upset in Los Angeles after suffering four fumbles and giving up two interceptions, though the game was not decided until UCLA's Efren Herrera kicked a field goal to break the tie with just 22 seconds remaining. The upset loss dropped Nebraska from first to tenth in the AP Poll rankings.

=== Texas A&M ===
Texas A&M at #10 Nebraska [box score]

Team	1	2	3	4	Total
Texas A&M	0	0	0	7	7
• #10 Nebraska	14	7	7	9	37

- Date: 1972-09-16
- Location: Memorial Stadium, Lincoln, Nebraska
- Game start: 1:30 pm CST
- Game attendance: 76,042

Scoring summary
1	8:20	Nebraska	Humm 1-yard run (Sanger kick)	Nebraska 7–0
1	:13	Nebraska	Humm 1-yard run (Sanger kick)	Nebraska 14–0
2	4:12	Nebraska	Damkrogger 1-yard run (Sanger kick)	Nebraska 21–0
3	7:26	Nebraska	List 9-yard pass from Humm (Sanger kick)	Nebraska 28–0
4	14:34	Nebraska	Sanger 54-yard field goal	Nebraska 31–0
4	9:03	Nebraska	Bahe 12-yard pass from Runty (kick failed)	Nebraska 37–0
4	3:29	Texas A&M	May 29-yard pass from Dean (McDermott kick)	Nebraska 37–7

Due to a stadium expansion completed over the summer, Nebraska's home opener drew record attendance with slightly more than 76,000 spectators. Nebraska recovered from the loss to UCLA with a dominant 37–7 victory over Texas A&M, whose sole touchdown came late in the 4th quarter against Cornhusker reserves.

=== Army ===
#9 Nebraska at Army [box score]

Team	1	2	3	4	Total
• #9 Nebraska	14	21	28	14	77
Army	0	0	0	7	7

- Date: 1972-09-23
- Location: Michie Stadium, West Point, New York
- Game attendance: 42,239

Nebraska entirely stomped Army, with the Cornhusker reserves taking over in the 3rd quarter behind a very comfortable lead, and the Black Knights' lone score to prevent the shutout came on a 10-yard pass reception with just 35 seconds left to play.

=== Minnesota ===
Minnesota at #7 Nebraska [box score]

Team	1	2	3	4	Total
Minnesota	0	0	0	0	0
• #7 Nebraska	7	21	14	7	49

- Date: 1972-09-30
- Location: Memorial Stadium, Lincoln, Nebraska
- Game attendance: 76,217

For the third straight week, Nebraska dominated the game in every way, shutting out Minnesota while piling up 542 yards of offense.

=== Missouri ===
Missouri at #6 Nebraska [box score]

Team	1	2	3	4	Total
Missouri	0	0	0	0	0
• #6 Nebraska	7	14	27	14	62

- Date: 1972-10-14
- Location: Memorial Stadium, Lincoln, Nebraska
- Game attendance: 76,511

Nebraska was not affected by the week off, and thoroughly pounded Missouri 62–0. Although the scoreboard and statistics might suggest Missouri was out of their league against Nebraska, the Tigers went on after this painful shutout to upset Notre Dame and Colorado in their next two games.

=== Kansas ===
#5 Nebraska at Kansas [box score]

Team	1	2	3	4	Total
• #5 Nebraska	0	28	14	14	56
Kansas	0	0	0	0	0

- Date: 1972-10-21
- Location: Memorial Stadium, Lawrence, Kansas
- Game attendance: 50,500

The shutouts and domination continued, as Nebraska scored at will against Kansas in Lawrence (albeit with Cornhusker fans forming the majority of the sellout crowd of 50,500), and held the Jayhawks to just 63 total yards of offense and only four first downs.

=== Oklahoma State ===
Oklahoma State at #3 Nebraska [box score]

Team	1	2	3	4	Total
Oklahoma State	0	0	0	0	0
• #3 Nebraska	13	0	7	14	34

- Date: 1972-10-28
- Location: Memorial Stadium, Lincoln, Nebraska
- Game attendance: 76,432

Nebraska tied a 1937 NCAA record of four straight shutouts, and although Oklahoma State was not as easy to push around as the previous three opponents, the Cornhuskers still had little trouble getting the win.

=== Colorado ===
#3 Nebraska at #15 Colorado [box score]

Team	1	2	3	4	Total
• #3 Nebraska	19	0	14	0	33
#15 Colorado	0	10	0	0	10

- Date: 1972-11-04
- Location: Folsom Field, Boulder, Colorado
- Game attendance: 52,128

Colorado attempted to put some more challenge into the event than Nebraska had been seeing in recent games, and was even able to draw back from a 0–19 deficit to get within 9 by halftime and end Nebraska's shutout streak, but it was all Cornhusker points the rest of the way. Still, the Blackshirts mourned the end of their touchdown-free stretch at 17 quarters.

=== Iowa State ===
#3 Nebraska at #17 Iowa State [box score]

Team	1	2	3	4	Total
#3 Nebraska	7	6	0	10	23
#17 Iowa State	0	10	7	6	23

- Date: 1972-11-11
- Location: Clyde Williams Field, Ames, Iowa
- Game attendance: 36,231

Iowa State pretty much ended any Nebraska hopes for another national title, as the Cornhuskers gave up two interceptions and six fumbles to help the Cyclones stay in the game. Nebraska came back from behind to pull ahead 20–17 in the 4th, and padded the lead with a field goal when the clock was down to just 1:03, but Iowa State stormed back down the field to score again with 0:23 remaining, and would have won the game outright if the subsequent PAT had not failed and ended the game tied at 23.

=== Kansas State ===
Kansas State at #5 Nebraska [box score]

Team	1	2	3	4	Total
Kansas State	0	0	0	7	7
• #5 Nebraska	10	28	14	7	59

- Date: 1972-11-18
- Location: Memorial Stadium, Lincoln, Nebraska
- Game attendance: 75,079

Nebraska put up Coach Devaney's 100th career win as the Cornhuskers easily trampled Kansas State in Lincoln and had reserves in the game for playing time while cruising behind a comfortable 38–0 lead even prior to the half. The Wildcats finally put up a touchdown with just over 6 minutes remaining to play.

=== Oklahoma ===
#4 Oklahoma at #5 Nebraska [box score]

Team	1	2	3	4	Total
• #4 Oklahoma	0	0	7	10	17
#5 Nebraska	7	0	7	0	14

- Date: 1972-11-23
- Location: Memorial Stadium, Lincoln, Nebraska
- Game start: 1:30 pm CST
- Game attendance: 76,587

It looked like Nebraska's day on Thanksgiving in Devaney's final home game as head coach. They led at the half and were up 14–0 in the 3rd, but underdog Oklahoma scored seventeen unanswered points for the win; Nebraska's three-year home winning streak, which began in September 1969, ended at 23 games.

=== Notre Dame ===
#9 Nebraska vs #12 Notre Dame [box score]

Team	1	2	3	4	Total
#12 Notre Dame	0	0	0	6	6
• #9 Nebraska	7	13	20	0	40

- Date: 1973-01-01
- Location: Orange Bowl, Miami, Florida
- Game attendance: 80,010

Heisman Trophy winner Johnny Rodgers was shifted from WB to IB for the 1973 Orange Bowl, and flashed brilliance as he ran for three touchdowns, caught a touchdown pass, and also threw a fifth touchdown. The Cornhuskers scored with ease and often against the stunned Fighting Irish, who were unable to put any points up of their own until the 4th quarter. This was head coach Bob Devaney's final game, a third straight Orange Bowl victory, and second straight Orange Bowl rout.

== Rankings ==
Ranking movements Legend: ██ Increase in ranking ██ Decrease in ranking
	Week														
Poll	Pre	1	2	3	4	5	6	7	8	9	10	11	12	13	Final
AP	1	10	9	7	6	6	5	3	3	3	5	5	8	9	4
Coaches	1	9	8	7	5	5	4	4	3	2	5	5	8	9	9

== Awards ==
Award	Name(s)
Heisman Trophy	Johnny Rodgers
Walter Camp Award	Johnny Rodgers
Outland Trophy	Rich Glover
Lombardi Award	Rich Glover
All-America; 1st team	Rich Glover, Willie Harper, Johnny Rodgers, Daryl White
All-America; 2nd team	Joe Blahak
Big Eight; Defensive Player of the Year	Rich Glover
Big Eight; Offensive Player of the Year	Daryl White
All-Big Eight; 1st team	Joe Blahak, Rich Glover, Willie Harper, Johnny Rodgers, Daryl White
All-Big Eight; 2nd team	Jim Branch, Doug Dumler, Dave Humm, Bill Janssen, Steve Manstedt, Dave Mason, Bob Wolfe

== 1972 team Players in the NFL ==
The 1972 Nebraska Cornhuskers seniors selected in the 1973 NFL draft:

Player	Position	Round	Pick	Franchise
Johnny Rodgers	WR	1	25	San Diego Chargers
Willie Harper	LB	2	41	San Francisco 49ers
Monte Johnson	LB	2	49	Oakland Raiders
Bill Olds	RB	3	61	Baltimore Colts
Rich Glover	DT	3	69	New York Giants
Doug Dumler	C	5	108	New England Patriots
Joe Blahak	DB	8	183	Houston Oilers
Bill Janssen	T	8	206	Pittsburgh Steelers
Dave Mason	DB	10	246	Minnesota Vikings
Jerry List	TE	11	283	Oakland Raiders

The 1972 Nebraska Cornhuskers juniors selected in the following year's 1974 NFL draft:

Player	Position	Round	Pick	Franchise
John Dutton	DE	1	5	Baltimore Colts
Steve Manstedt	LB	4	79	Houston Oilers
Daryl White	G	4	98	Cincinnati Bengals
Bob Wolfe	T	6	156	Miami Dolphins
Maury Damkroger	LB	7	178	New England Patriots
Frosty Anderson	WR	10	235	New Orleans Saints

The 1972 Nebraska Cornhuskers sophomores selected in the 1975 NFL draft:

Player	Position	Round	Pick	Franchise
Tom Ruud	LB	1	19	Buffalo Bills
Bob Nelson	LB	2	42	Buffalo Bills
John Starkebaum	DB	4	92	New Orleans Saints
David Humm	QB	5	128	Oakland Raiders
Don Westbrook	WR	6	131	Baltimore Colts
Mark Doak	T	6	147	Washington Redskins
Ardell Johnson	DB	11	277	Washington Redskins
Ritch Bahe	WR	14	358	St. Louis Cardinals
Dennis Pavelka	G	16	412	Washington Redskins
Stan Hegener	G	17	442	Pittsburgh Steelers

=== NFL and pro players ===
The following is a list of 1972 Nebraska players
who joined a professional team as draftees or free agents.

Name	Team
Tom Alward	Birmingham Vulcans
Joe Blahak	Houston Oilers
Tony Davis	Cincinnati Bengals
Gary Dixon	Southern California Sun
Mark Doak	Birmingham Vulcans
Maury Damkroger	New England Patriots
Doug Dumler	New England Patriots
John Dutton	Baltimore Colts
Rich Glover	New York Giants
Willie Harper	San Francisco 49ers
Dave Humm	Oakland Raiders
Bill Janssen	Charlotte Hornets
Monte Johnson	Oakland Raiders
Brent Longwell	Memphis Southmen
Terry Luck	Cleveland Browns
Steve Manstedt	Birmingham Americans
Dave Mason	New England Patriots
Bob Nelson	Buffalo Bills
Bill Olds	Baltimore Colts
Tom Pate	Hamilton Tiger-Cats
Johnny Rodgers	Montreal Alouettes
Tom Ruud	Buffalo Bills
Bob Schmit	Portland Storm
Don Westbrook	New England Patriots
Daryl White	Detroit Lions
Bob Wolfe	Birmingham Americans
Zaven Yaralian	Philadelphia Bell
