= Don Westbrook =

American football player (born 1952)

No. 83
- Position: Wide receiver

Personal information
- Born: November 1, 1953 (age 73); Cheyenne, Wyoming, U.S.
- Listed height: 5 ft 10 in (1.78 m)
- Listed weight: 185 lb (84 kg)

Career information
- High school: Cheyenne Central (WY)
- College: Nebraska
- NFL draft: 1975: 6th round, 131st overall pick

Career history
- Baltimore Colts (1975)*; New England Patriots (1977–1981)
- * Offseason or practice squad member only

Awards and highlights
- National champion (1971)

Career NFL statistics
- Receptions: 23
- Receiving yards: 393
- Receiving TDs: 3
- Stats at Pro Football Reference

Don Westbrook (born November 1, 1952) is a former wide receiver in the National Football League (NFL). He played for the New England Patriots from 1977 to 1981. He played his college football at the University of Nebraska–Lincoln. He was a member of the undefeated 1971 squad that won the National Championship.
