= 1972 Liberty Bowl =

American college football game

- 14th Liberty Bowl
| Iowa State Cyclones | Georgia Tech Yellow Jackets |
| (5–5–1) | (6–4–1) |
| Big Eight | Independent |
| 30 | 31 |
| Head coach: Johnny Majors | Head coach: Bill Fulcher |
| | 1 | 2 | 3 | 4 | Total |
|---|---|---|---|---|---|
| Iowa State | 14 | 7 | 3 | 6 | 30 |
| Georgia Tech | 3 | 14 | 7 | 7 | 31 |
- Date: December 18, 1972
- Season: 1972
- Stadium: Memphis Memorial Stadium
- Location: Memphis, Tennessee
- MVP: QB Jim Stevens (Georgia Tech)
- Referee: John Miskovsky (Big Eight) (split crew: Big Eight, SEC)
- Attendance: 50,021

United States TV coverage
- Network: ABC
- Announcers: Chris Schenkel (Play-by-play), Bud Wilkinson (Color commentary)

The 1972 Liberty Bowl was a college football postseason bowl game played on December 18, 1972, in Memphis, Tennessee. In the 14th edition of the Liberty Bowl, the Georgia Tech Yellow Jackets defeated the Iowa State Cyclones, 31–30.

== Background ==
The Cyclones finished 5th in the Big Eight Conference, after falling from 8–4 to 5–5–1 in their second straight bowl appearance. The Yellow Jackets were in a bowl for the third straight year under first year head coach Bill Fulcher. This was the first Liberty Bowl for both teams. The game was nationally televised in primetime on ABC.

== Game summary ==
An Iowa State fumble led to a Cam Bonifay field goal to make it 3-0 Georgia Tech less than two minutes into the game. Iowa State responded with two touchdowns in the first quarter, one of them on a George Amundson touchdown pass and the other on a Moses Moore touchdown run. Jimmy Robinson caught a touchdown pass from backup quarterback Jim Stevens to make it 14-9 midway through the second quarter. Gary Faulkner returned an interception for a touchdown to make it 17-14 with 1:46 remaining in the 1st half. But on the ensuing kickoff return, Moore returned it 93 yards for a touchdown to make it 21-17 at halftime. Rob Healy caught a touchdown pass from Stevens to make it 24-21 Georgia Tech. Iowa State responded with a Tom Goedjen field goal with 1:40 remaining in the third to make it a 24-24 tie going into the final quarter. Kevin McNamara caught a touchdown pass from Stevens to make it 31-24 with 11:28 remaining. On a pitchout pass attempt by Stevens, the Cyclones recovered the ball at the Jacket 33 with the chance to tie/win. An Ike Harris touchdown from George Amundson had made it 31-30 with 1:36 to go. But on the ensuing two-point conversion, Amundson threw the ball away, and Mark Fields recovered the ensuing onside kick for Georgia Tech to clinch the game. Jim Stevens completed 12 of 15 passes for 157 yards and three touchdowns and was named Most Valuable Player.

== Aftermath ==
Majors announced that he would leave Iowa State to coach Pittsburgh, and he was replaced by Earle Bruce. Fulcher left Georgia Tech the following season. While Georgia Tech has not returned to the Liberty Bowl since this game, Iowa State returned in 2012 and 2017.

== Statistics ==
| Statistics | Iowa State | Georgia Tech |
|---|---|---|
| First downs | 18 | 18 |
| Rushing yards | 185 | 123 |
| Yards passing | 153 | 157 |
| Total offense | 338 | 280 |
| Interceptions thrown | 2 | 1 |
| Fumbles-lost | 3-2 | 5-2 |
| Punts-average | 3-24.6 | 5-36.6 |
| Penalties-yards | 4-39 | 1-5 |
