= Dave Smith (American football coach) =

American football player and coach (1933–2009)

Biographical details
- Born: March 3, 1933; Lockhart, Texas, U.S.
- Died: August 29, 2009 (aged 76); Granbury, Texas, U.S.

Coaching career (HC unless noted)
- late 1950s: Texas A&I (assistant)
- c. 1960: Douglas MacArthur HS (TX)
- c. 1960: Corsicana HS (TX)
- ?–1961: Nederland HS (TX)
- 1962: Sherman HS (TX)
- 1963–1970: SMU (assistant)
- 1971: Winnipeg Blue Bombers (OC)
- 1972: Oklahoma State
- 1973–1975: SMU
- early 1980s: Garland HS (TX) (OC)

Head coaching record
- Overall: 23–19–2 (college)

Dave Smith (1933 – August 29, 2009) was an American football player and coach. He served as the head football coach at Oklahoma State University–Stillwater in 1972 and at Southern Methodist University from 1973 to 1975, compiling a career college football record of 23–19–2. He played quarterback at Lockhart High School and later Texas A&M University. He lived in Granbury, Texas.

== Head coaching record ==
=== College ===
Year	Team	Overall	Conference	Standing
Oklahoma State Cowboys (Big Eight Conference) (1972)
1972	Oklahoma State	7–4	5–2	2nd
Oklahoma State:		7–4	4–2	
SMU Mustangs (Southwest Conference) (1973–1975)
1973	SMU	6–4–1	3–3–1	T–4th
1974	SMU	6–4–1	3–3–1	T–4th
1975	SMU	4–7	2–5	T–5th
SMU:		16–15–2	8–11–2	
Total:		23–19–2		
