= Al Chandler =

American football player (born 1950)

No. 81, 87, 82
- Position: Tight end

Personal information
- Born: November 18, 1950 (age 75); Oklahoma City, Oklahoma, U.S.
- Listed height: 6 ft 2 in (1.88 m)
- Listed weight: 233 lb (106 kg)

Career information
- High school: Frederick Douglass (OK)
- College: Oklahoma
- NFL draft: 1973: 2nd round, 43rd overall pick

Career history
- Cincinnati Bengals (1973-1974); New England Patriots (1976-1978); St. Louis Cardinals (1978-1979); New England Patriots (1979)

Awards and highlights
- Second-team All-American (1972); Second-team All-Big Eight (1971)

Career NFL statistics
- Receptions: 35
- Receiving yards: 367
- Receiving TDs: 9
- Stats at Pro Football Reference

Albert Morris Chandler (born November 18, 1950) is an American former professional football player who was a tight end for six seasons in the National Football League (NFL) for the Cincinnati Bengals, New England Patriots, and St. Louis Cardinals.

== Professional career ==
=== Cincinnati Bengals ===
Chandler didn't record a single catch in his first season as a Cincinnati Bengal. In his second year, he recorded one catch for nine yards and no touchdowns.
