= Bill Ferguson (American football) =

American football player (born 1951)

No. 58
- Position: Linebacker

Personal information
- Born: July 7, 1951 (age 75); San Diego, California, U.S.
- Listed height: 6 ft 3 in (1.91 m)
- Listed weight: 225 lb (102 kg)

Career information
- High school: Grossmont (El Cajon, California)
- College: Washington; San Diego State
- NFL draft: 1973: 4th round, 90th overall pick

Career history
- New York Jets (1973–1974)
- Stats at Pro Football Reference

William Michael Ferguson (born July 7, 1951) is an American former professional football player who was a linebacker for two seasons in the National Football League (NFL) for the New York Jets. He played college football initially for the Washington Huskies and concluded with the San Diego State Aztecs. Ferguson was selected in the fourth round of the 1973 NFL draft.
