= John Fritsch =

American football player and coach

Playing career
- 1973–1975: Iowa State

Coaching career (HC unless noted)
- 1976: Dowling Catholic HS (IA) (assistant)
- 1982–1988: South Dakota (AHC/OC)
- 1989–1991: South Dakota
- 2015: O'Gorman Catholic HS (SD) (assistant)

Head coaching record
- Overall: 10–21

John Fritsch is an American football coach and former player. He served as the head football coach at the University of South Dakota from 1989 to 1991, compiling a record of 10–21. Fritsch played college football at Iowa State University, lettering from 1973 to 1975.

== Head coaching record ==
Year	Team	Overall	Conference	Standing	Bowl/playoffs
South Dakota Coyotes (North Central Conference) (1989–1991)
1989	South Dakota	5–6	4–5	7th	
1990	South Dakota	4–7	3–6	T–7th	
1991	South Dakota	1–8	1–7	T–8th	
South Dakota:		10–21	8–18		
Total:		10–21			
