= 1972 NCAA University Division football rankings =

- Season: 1972
- Bowl season: 1972–73 bowl games
- Preseason No. 1: Nebraska
- End of season champions: USC

Two human polls comprised the 1972 NCAA University Division football rankings. Unlike most sports, college football's governing body, the NCAA, does not bestow a national championship, instead that title is bestowed by one or more different polling agencies. There are two main weekly polls that begin in the preseason—the AP Poll and the Coaches Poll.

== Legend ==
	Increase in ranking
	Decrease in ranking
	Not ranked previous week
	National champion
(#–#)	Win–loss record
(Italics)	Number of first place votes
т	Tied with team above or below also with this symbol

== AP Poll ==
	Preseason Aug	Week 1 Sep 11	Week 2 Sep 18	Week 3 Sep 25	Week 4 Oct 2	Week 5 Oct 9	Week 6 Oct 16	Week 7 Oct 23	Week 8 Oct 30	Week 9 Nov 6	Week 10 Nov 13	Week 11 Nov 20	Week 12 Nov 27	Week 13 Dec 4	Week 14 (Final) Jan	
1.	Nebraska (28)	USC (1–0) (13)	USC (2–0) (28)	USC (3–0) (28)	USC (4–0) (36)	USC (5–0) (34)	USC (6–0) (28)	USC (7–0) (44)	USC (8–0) (41)	USC (9–0) (40)	USC (9–0) (42)	USC (10–0) (44)	USC (10–0) (46)	USC (11–0) (50)	USC (12–0) (50)	1.
2.	Colorado (13)	Colorado (1–0) (12)	Oklahoma (1–0) (11)	Oklahoma (2–0) (14)	Oklahoma (3–0) (13)	Oklahoma (3–0) (15)	Oklahoma (4–0) (20)	Alabama (6–0) (2)	Alabama (7–0) (3)	Alabama (8–0) (3)	Alabama (9–0) (5)	Alabama (10–0) (5)	Alabama (10–0) (4)	Oklahoma (10–1)	Oklahoma (11–1)	2.
3.	Ohio State (4)	Ohio State (0–0) (5)	Colorado (2–0) (7)	Colorado (3–0) (5)	Ohio State (2–0)	Alabama (4–0)	Alabama (5–0)	Nebraska (5–1) (2)	Nebraska (6–1) (4)	Nebraska (7–1) (5)	Michigan (9–0) (3)	Michigan (10–0) (1)	Oklahoma (9–1)	Ohio State (9–1)	Texas (10–1)	3.
4.	Arkansas (2)	Oklahoma (0–0) (12)	Ohio State (1–0) (2)	Tennessee (3–0) (1)	Alabama (3–0)	Ohio State (3–0) (1)	Ohio State (4–0) (1)	Ohio State (5–0) (1)	Michigan (7–0) (1)	Michigan (8–0) (1)	Oklahoma (7–1)	Oklahoma (8–1)	Ohio State (9–1)	Alabama (10–1)	Nebraska (9–2–1)	4.
5.	Penn State	Alabama (1–0)	Tennessee (2–0) (2)	Ohio State (1–0) (1)	Michigan (3–0) (1)	Michigan (4–0)	Nebraska (4–1)	Michigan (6–0) (1)	Ohio State (6–0) (1)	Ohio State (7–0) (1)	Nebraska (7–1–1)	Nebraska (8–1–1)	Penn State (10–1)	Penn State (10–1)	Auburn (10–1)	5.
6.	Oklahoma (2)	Penn State (0–0) (1)	UCLA (2–0)	Alabama (2–0)	Nebraska (3–1)	Nebraska (3–1)	Michigan (5–0) (1)	LSU (6–0)	LSU (6–0)	LSU (7–0)	Penn State (8–1)	Penn State (9–1)	Texas (9–1)	Auburn (9–1)	Michigan (10–1)	6.
7.	Alabama	Tennessee (1–0) (1)	Alabama (1–0)	Nebraska (2–1)	Notre Dame (2–0)	Notre Dame (3–0)	LSU (5–0)	Colorado (6–1)	Oklahoma (5–1)	Oklahoma (6–1)	Texas (7–1)	Texas (8–1)	Michigan (10–1)	Texas (9–1)	Alabama (10–2)	7.
8.	USC	UCLA (1–0)	LSU (1–0)	Michigan (2–0) (1)	LSU (3–0)	LSU (4–0)	Notre Dame (4–0)	Oklahoma (4–1)	UCLA (7–1)	UCLA (8–1)	LSU (7–1)	LSU (8–1)	Nebraska (8–2–1)	Michigan (10–1)	Tennessee (10–2)	8.
9.	Washington (1)	LSU (0–0)	Nebraska (1–1)	LSU (2–0)	Texas (2–0)	Auburn (4–0)	Colorado (5–1)	UCLA (6–1)	Texas (5–1)	Texas (6–1)	Ohio State (7–1)	Ohio State (8–1)	Auburn (8–1)	Nebraska (8–2–1)	Ohio State (9–2)	9.
10.	Michigan	Nebraska (0–1) (1)	Arizona State (2–0)	Notre Dame (1–0)	Tennessee (3–1)	Texas (3–0)	Tennessee (4–1)	Texas (4–1)	Penn State (6–1)	Penn State (7–1)	Notre Dame (7–1)	Auburn (8–1)	Notre Dame (8–1)	LSU (9–1–1)	Penn State (10–2)	10.
11.	LSU	Michigan (0–0)	Penn State (0–1)	Arizona State (3–0)	Washington (4–0)	Tennessee (4–1)	UCLA (5–1)	Penn State (5–1)	Auburn (6–1)	Auburn (7–1)	Auburn (7–1)	Notre Dame (8–1)	LSU (8–1–1)	Tennessee (9–2)	LSU (9–2–1)	11.
12.	Arizona State	Washington (1–0) (1)	Michigan (1–0)	Texas (1–0)	Colorado (3–1)	Washington (5–0)	Penn State (4–1)	Auburn (5–1)	Notre Dame (5–1)	Notre Dame (6–1)	Iowa State (5–2–1)	Tennessee (7–2)	Tennessee (8–2)	Notre Dame (8–2)	North Carolina (11–1)	12.
13.	Notre Dame	Arizona State (1–0)	Notre Dame (0–0)	Penn State (1–1)	Florida State (4–0)	Colorado (4–1)	Stanford (4–1)	Notre Dame (4–1)	Tennessee (4–2)	Tennessee (5–2)	Tennessee (6–2)	Colorado (8–3)	Colorado (8–3)	Colorado (8–3)	Arizona State (10–2)	13.
14.	Texas	Notre Dame (0–0)	Texas (0–0)	Washington (3–0)	UCLA (3–1)	UCLA (4–1)	Auburn (4–1) т	Tennessee (4–2)	Iowa State (5–1)	Missouri (5–3)	UCLA (8–2)	UCLA (8–3)	North Carolina (9–1)	UCLA (8–3)	Notre Dame (8–3)	14.
15.	Tennessee	Texas (0–0)	Washington (2–0)	UCLA (2–1)	Stanford (3–0)	Penn State (3–1)	Texas (3–1) т	Iowa State (4–1)	Colorado (6–2)	Texas Tech (7–1)	Colorado (7–3)	North Carolina (8–1)	UCLA (8–3)	Arizona State (9–2)	UCLA (8–3)	15.
16.	Ole Miss	Georgia (0–0)	Georgia (1–0)	Florida State (3–0)	Penn State (2–1)	Air Force (4–0)	Air Force (5–0)	Arizona State (5–1)	Missouri (4–3)	Colorado (6–3)	North Carolina (7–1)	Missouri (6–4)	Arizona State (9–2)	North Carolina (9–1)	Colorado (8–4)	16.
17.	Georgia	Arkansas (0–1)	Florida State (2–0)	Ole Miss (2–0)	Auburn (3–0)	Stanford (3–1)	Arkansas (4–1)	Florida State (6–1)	Louisville (6–0)	Iowa State (5–2)	Washington (8–2)	Iowa State (5–3–1)	Louisville (9–1)	Louisville (9–1)	NC State (8–3–1)	17.
18.	Purdue	Purdue (0–0)	Michigan State (1–0)	Tulane (2–0)	Ole Miss (3–0)	Iowa State (3–0)	Washington (5–1)	Arkansas (4–2) т	Texas Tech (6–1)	North Carolina (6–1)	Arizona State (7–2)	Arizona State (8–2)	West Virginia (8–3)	West Virginia (8–3)	Louisville (9–1)	18.
19.	Florida State	Ole Miss (0–0)	Stanford (1–0)	Stanford (2–0)	Air Force (3–0)	Oklahoma State (3–1)	Arizona State (4–1)	SMU (4–1) т	Air Force (6–1)	Arizona State (6–2)	Missouri (5–4)	Washington State (7–4)	Washington State (7–4)	Washington State (7–4)	Washington State (7–4)	19.
20.	Stanford	Florida State (1–0)	Ole Miss (1–0)	West Virginia (3–0)	Iowa State (3–0)	Arkansas (3–1)	Iowa State (3–1)	West Virginia (5–2) т	Arkansas (5–2)	Stanford (5–3) т; Yale (5–1) т	Washington State (6–4)	Texas Tech (8–2)	Oklahoma State (6–4)	Purdue (6–5)	Georgia Tech (7–4–1)	20.
	Preseason Aug	Week 1 Sep 11	Week 2 Sep 18	Week 3 Sep 25	Week 4 Oct 2	Week 5 Oct 9	Week 6 Oct 16	Week 7 Oct 23	Week 8 Oct 30	Week 9 Nov 6	Week 10 Nov 13	Week 11 Nov 20	Week 12 Nov 27	Week 13 Dec 4	Week 14 (Final) Jan	
		Dropped: Stanford	Dropped: Arkansas; Purdue	Dropped: Georgia; Michigan State	Dropped: Arizona State; Tulane; West Virginia	Dropped: Florida State; Ole Miss	Dropped: Oklahoma State	Dropped: Air Force; Stanford; Washington	Dropped: Arizona State; Florida State; SMU; West Virginia	Dropped: Air Force; Arkansas; Louisville	Dropped: Stanford; Texas Tech; Yale	Dropped: Washington	Dropped: Iowa State; Missouri; Texas Tech	Dropped: Oklahoma State	Dropped: Purdue; West Virginia	

== UPI Coaches Poll ==
	Preseason Sep 6	Week 1 Sep 12	Week 2 Sep 19	Week 3 Sep 26	Week 4 Oct 3	Week 5 Oct 10	Week 6 Oct 17 (Note: Less than 20 teams received votes in this poll.)	Week 7 Oct 24	Week 8 Oct 31	Week 9 Nov 7	Week 10 Nov 14	Week 11 Nov 21	Week 12 Nov 28	Week 13 (Final) Dec 5	
1.	Nebraska (26)	Oklahoma (0–0) (11)	USC (2–0) (14)	USC (3–0) (20)	USC (4–0) (22)	USC (5–0) (21)	USC (6–0) (22)	USC (7–0) (32)	USC (8–0) (31)	USC (9–0) (27)	USC (9–0) (31)	USC (10–0) (31)	USC (10–0) (31)	USC (11–0) (35)	1.
2.	Colorado (4)	USC (1–0) (11)	Oklahoma (1–0) (13)	Oklahoma (2–0) (12)	Oklahoma (3–0) (11)	Oklahoma (3–0) (13)	Oklahoma (4–0) (12)	Alabama (5–0) (2)	Alabama (7–0) (2)	Nebraska (7–1) (6)	Alabama (9–0) (3)	Alabama (10–0) (3)	Alabama (10–0) (3)	Oklahoma (10–1)	2.
3.	Oklahoma (2)	Colorado (1–0) (6)	Colorado (2–0) (4)	Colorado (3–0) (1)	Alabama (4–0) (1)	Alabama (5–0) (1)	Alabama (5–0) (1)	Ohio State (5–0)	Nebraska (6–1) (2)	Alabama (8–0) (2)	Michigan (9–0)	Michigan (10–0)	Oklahoma (9–1)	Ohio State (9–1)	3.
4.	Ohio State (2)	Ohio State (0–0) (4)	Tennessee (2–0)	Tennessee (3–0)	Ohio State (2–0) (1)	Ohio State (3–0)	Nebraska (4–1)	Nebraska (5–1) (1)	Ohio State (6–0)	Ohio State (7–0)	Oklahoma (7–1)	Oklahoma (8–1)	Ohio State (9–1)	Alabama (10–1)	4.
5.	Arkansas (1)	Alabama (1–0) (2)	Ohio State (1–0) (2)	Alabama (2–0) (1)	Nebraska (3–1)	Nebraska (3–1)	Ohio State (4–0)	Michigan (6–0)	Michigan (7–0)	Michigan (8–0)	Nebraska (7–1–1) (1)	Nebraska (8–1–1) (1)	Texas (9–1)	Texas (9–1)	5.
6.	Penn State	Tennessee (1–0)	Alabama (1–0) (1)	Ohio State (1–0) (1)	Michigan (3–0)	Michigan (4–0)	Michigan (5–0)	LSU (6–0)	Oklahoma (5–1)	LSU (7–0)	Texas (6–1)	Texas (7–1)	Michigan (10–1)	Michigan (10–1)	6.
7.	Alabama	Penn State (0–0)	UCLA (2–0) (1)	Nebraska (2–1)	LSU (3–0)	Notre Dame (3–0)	LSU (5–0)	Colorado (6–1)	LSU (6–0)	Oklahoma (6–1)	LSU (7–1)	Penn State (9–1)	Penn State (10–1)	Auburn (9–1)	7.
8.	USC	LSU (0–0)	Nebraska (1–1)	Michigan (2–0)	Notre Dame (2–0)	LSU (4–0)	Notre Dame (4–0)	Oklahoma (4–1)	UCLA (7–1)	UCLA (8–1)	Penn State (8–1)	Ohio State (8–1)	Nebraska (8–2–1)	Penn State (10–1)	8.
9.	Washington	Nebraska (0–1)	LSU (1–0)	LSU (2–0)	Washington (4–0)	Auburn (4–0)	UCLA (5–1)	UCLA (6–1)	Texas (5–1)	Texas (6–1)	Ohio State (7–1)	LSU (8–1)	Auburn (8–1)	Nebraska (8–2–1)	9.
10.	Michigan	Michigan (0–0)	Arizona State (1–0)	Notre Dame (1–0)	Texas (2–0)	Washington (5–0)	Colorado (5–1)	Penn State (5–1)	Auburn (6–1)	Auburn (7–1)	Auburn (7–1)	Auburn (8–1)	Notre Dame (8–1)	LSU (9–1–1)	10.
11.	LSU	UCLA (1–0)	Michigan (1–0)	Arizona State (2–0)	Florida State (4–0)	Texas (3–0)	Tennessee (4–1)	Texas (4–1)	Penn State (6–1)	Penn State (7–1)	Notre Dame (7–1)	Notre Dame (8–1)	Tennessee (8–2)	Tennessee (9–2)	11.
12.	Arizona State	Arizona State (0–0)	Michigan State (1–0)	Washington (3–0)	Tennessee (3–1)	Tennessee (4–1)	Stanford (4–1)	Auburn (5–1)	Notre Dame (5–1)	Notre Dame (6–1)	Iowa State (5–2–1)	Tennessee (6–2)	LSU (8–2–1)	Notre Dame (8–2)	12.
13.	Notre Dame	Texas (0–0)	Notre Dame (0–0) т	Florida State (3–0)	UCLA (3–1)	UCLA (4–1)	Penn State (4–1)	Arizona State (5–1)	Iowa State (5–1)	Tennessee (5–2)	Tennessee (5–2)	Colorado (8–3)	Colorado (8–3)	Arizona State (9–2)	13.
14.	Tennessee	Notre Dame (0–0)	Penn State (0–1) т	Texas (1–0)	Auburn (3–0)	Iowa State (3–0)	Air Force (5–0)	Iowa State (4–1)	Colorado (6–2)	Iowa State (5–2)	UCLA (8–2)	Arizona State (8–2)	Arizona State (9–2)	Colorado (8–3) т	14.
15.	Texas	Washington (1–0)	Texas (0–0)	Iowa State (2–0)	Air Force (3–0)	Air Force (4–0)	Auburn (4–1)	Notre Dame (4–1)	Air Force (6–1)	Texas Tech (7–1)	Colorado (7–3)	Utah State (7–3)	Utah State (8–3) т	North Carolina (9–1) т	15.
16.	Purdue	Florida State (1–0)	Florida State (2–0)	Penn State (1–1)	Colorado (3–1)	Colorado (4–1)	Arizona State (4–1)	Tennessee (4–2)	Tennessee (4–2) т	North Carolina (6–1) т	Washington (8–2)	North Carolina (8–1) т	Washington State (7–4) т	Louisville (9–1)	16.
17.	Georgia	Iowa State (0–0) т	Washington (2–0)	Air Force (2–0) т	Iowa State (3–0)	Penn State (3–1)		SMU (4–1)	Texas Tech (6–1) т	Colorado (6–3) т	North Carolina (7–1)	Missouri (6–4) т	UCLA (8–3) т	UCLA (8–3) т	17.
18.	Michigan State	Georgia (0–0) т	Iowa State (1–0)	West Virginia (3–0) т	Stanford (3–0)	Arizona State (3–1)		Florida State (6–1)	Stanford (5–2)		Arizona State (7–2) т	Iowa State (5–3–1)	North Carolina (9–1) т	Washington State (7–4) т	18.
19.	Iowa State	Purdue (0–0)	Georgia (1–0)	UCLA (2–1)	Penn State (2–1)	Oklahoma State (3–1)					Utah State (6–3) т		Missouri (6–4)	Utah State (8–3) т	19.
20.	Illinois т; West Virginia т	Auburn (0–0)	Arkansas (0–1)	Mississippi (2–0)	Arizona State (2–1)	Stanford (3–1)								San Diego State (10-1)	20.
	Preseason Sep 6	Week 1 Sep 12	Week 2 Sep 19	Week 3 Sep 26	Week 4 Oct 3	Week 5 Oct 10	Week 6 Oct 17	Week 7 Oct 24	Week 8 Oct 31	Week 9 Nov 7	Week 10 Nov 14	Week 11 Nov 21	Week 12 Nov 28	Week 13 (Final) Dec 5	
		Dropped: Arkansas; Michigan State; Illinois; West Virginia	Dropped: Auburn; Purdue	Dropped: Arkansas; Georgia; Michigan State	Dropped: Mississippi; West Virginia	Dropped: Florida State	Dropped: Iowa State; Oklahoma State; Texas; Washington	Dropped: Air Force; Stanford	Dropped: Arizona State; Florida State; SMU	Dropped: Air Force; Stanford	Dropped: Texas Tech	Dropped: UCLA; Washington	Dropped: Iowa State	Dropped: Missouri	

The final UPI Coaches Poll was released prior to the bowl games, in early December.
USC was a unanimous selection, with all 35 first-place votes.

Ranking	Team	Conference	Bowl
1	USC	Pac-8	Won Rose, 42–17
2	Oklahoma	Big Eight	Won Sugar, 14–0
3	Ohio State	Big Ten	Lost Rose, 17–42
4	Alabama	SEC	Lost Cotton, 13–17
5	Texas	Southwest	Won Cotton, 17–13
6	Michigan	Big Ten	none
7	Auburn	SEC	Won Gator, 24–3
8	Penn State	Independent	Lost Sugar, 0–14
9	Nebraska	Big Eight	Won Orange, 40–6
10	LSU	SEC	Lost Bluebonnet, 17–24
11	Tennessee	SEC	Won Bluebonnet, 24–17
12	Notre Dame	Independent	Lost Orange, 6–40
13	Arizona State	WAC	Won Fiesta, 49–35
14	Colorado	Big Eight	Lost Gator, 3–24
14	North Carolina	ACC	Won Sun, 32–28
16	Louisville	MVC	none
17	UCLA	Pac-8	none
17	Washington State	Pac-8	none
17	Utah State	Independent	none
20	San Diego State	PCAA	none

- Prior to the 1975 season, the Big Ten and Pac-8 conferences allowed only one postseason participant each, for the Rose Bowl.
