= 1972 Gator Bowl =

American college football game

Auburn Tigers	Colorado Buffaloes
(9–1)	(8–3)
SEC	Big Eight
24	3
Head coach: Ralph Jordan	Head coach: Eddie Crowder
AP / Coaches; 6 / 7	AP / Coaches; 13 / T–14
	1	2	3	4	Total
Auburn	0	10	7	7	24
Colorado	0	0	0	3	3
- Date: December 30, 1972
- Season: 1972
- Stadium: Gator Bowl
- Location: Jacksonville, Florida
- MVP: Wade Whatley, QB, Auburn; Mark Cooney, LB, Colorado
- Referee: Charles Bowen (SEC; split crew: SEC, Big Eight)
- Attendance: 71,114

United States TV coverage
- Network: ABC
- Announcers: Bill Flemming and Lee Grosscup

The 1972 Gator Bowl was held on December 30, 1972, at the Gator Bowl in Jacksonville, Florida. The sixth-ranked Auburn Tigers defeated the 13th-ranked Colorado Buffaloes by a score of 24–3.

== Game summary ==
The scoring was opened in the second quarter by Auburn, as they converted a 27-yard field goal to take a 3–0 lead. They extended their lead to ten as they found the end zone later in the same quarter off of a 1-yard run. They took a 10–0 lead into halftime. They controlled the third quarter as well, scoring on a 22-yard pass to take a 17–0 lead into the fourth quarter. The Tigers lost their shutout when the Buffaloes hit a 33-yard field goal, but Auburn quickly responded, scoring a 16-yard touchdown pass to make the score 24–3. The game finished with the same score.

== Aftermath ==
6th-ranked Auburn rose to #5 following their win; #13 Colorado fell to #16.
