= 1972 Missouri Tigers football team =

American college football season

1972 Missouri Tigers football

Fiesta Bowl, L 49-35 vs. Arizona State
- Conference: Big Eight Conference
- Record: 6–6 (3–4 Big 8)
- Head coach: Al Onofrio (2nd season)
- Home stadium: Faurot Field

1972 Big Eight Conference football standings
	Conf.					Overall
Team	W		L		T	W		L		T
No. 2 Oklahoma $	6	–	1	–	0	11	–	1	–	0
No. 4 Nebraska $	5	–	1	–	1	9	–	2	–	1
No. 16 Colorado	4	–	3	–	0	8	–	4	–	0
Oklahoma State	4	–	3	–	0	6	–	5	–	0
Missouri	3	–	4	–	0	6	–	6	–	0
Iowa State	2	–	4	–	1	5	–	6	–	1
Kansas	2	–	5	–	0	4	–	7	–	0
Kansas State	1	–	6	–	0	3	–	8	–	0
$ – Conference champion; The Big 8 Conference mandated Oklahoma forfeits in three conference games, giving Nebraska the title. Oklahoma reverted this record at a later date; hence, both Oklahoma and Nebraska claim this title.; Rankings from AP Poll

The 1972 Missouri Tigers football team was an American football team that represented the University of Missouri in the Big Eight Conference (Big 8) during the 1972 NCAA University Division football season. The team compiled a 6–6 record (3–4 against Big 8 opponents), finished in a tie for fourth place in the Big 8, and was outscored by opponents by a combined total of 311 to 219. Al Onofrio was the head coach for the second of seven seasons. The team played its home games at Faurot Field in Columbia, Missouri.

The team's statistical leaders included Tommy Reamon with 454 rushing yards, John Cherry with 861 passing yards and 1,094 yards of total offense, Jack Bastable with 362 receiving yards, and Greg Hill with 61 points scored.

== Schedule ==
Date	Time	Opponent	Rank	Site	Result	Attendance	Source
September 9		Oregon*		Faurot Field; Columbia, MO	W 24–22	41,236	
September 23		Baylor*		Faurot Field; Columbia, MO	L 0–27	42,000	
September 30	3:30 p.m.	California*		Faurot Field; Columbia, MO	W 34–27	41,000	
October 7		at Oklahoma State		Lewis Field; Stillwater, OK	L 16–17	38,000	
October 14		at No. 6 Nebraska		Memorial Stadium; Lincoln, NE (rivalry)	L 0–62	76,511	
October 21		at No. 8 Notre Dame*		Notre Dame Stadium; Notre Dame, IN	W 30–26	59,075	
October 28		No. 7 Colorado		Faurot Field; Columbia, MO	W 20–17	55,500	
November 4		at Kansas State	No. 16	KSU Stadium; Manhattan, KS	W 31–14	37,500	
November 11		at No. 7 Oklahoma	No. 14	Oklahoma Memorial Stadium; Norman, OK (rivalry)	L 6–17	61,826	
November 18		No. 12 Iowa State	No. 19	Faurot Field; Columbia, MO (rivalry)	W 6–5	49,500	
November 25		Kansas	No. 16	Faurot Field; Columbia, MO (Border War)	L 17–28	46,000	
December 23		vs. No. 15 Arizona State*		Sun Devil Stadium; Tempe, AZ (Fiesta Bowl)	L 35–49	51,318	
*Non-conference game; Rankings from AP Poll released prior to the game; All times are in Central time
