= Leon Crosswhite =

American football player (born 1951)

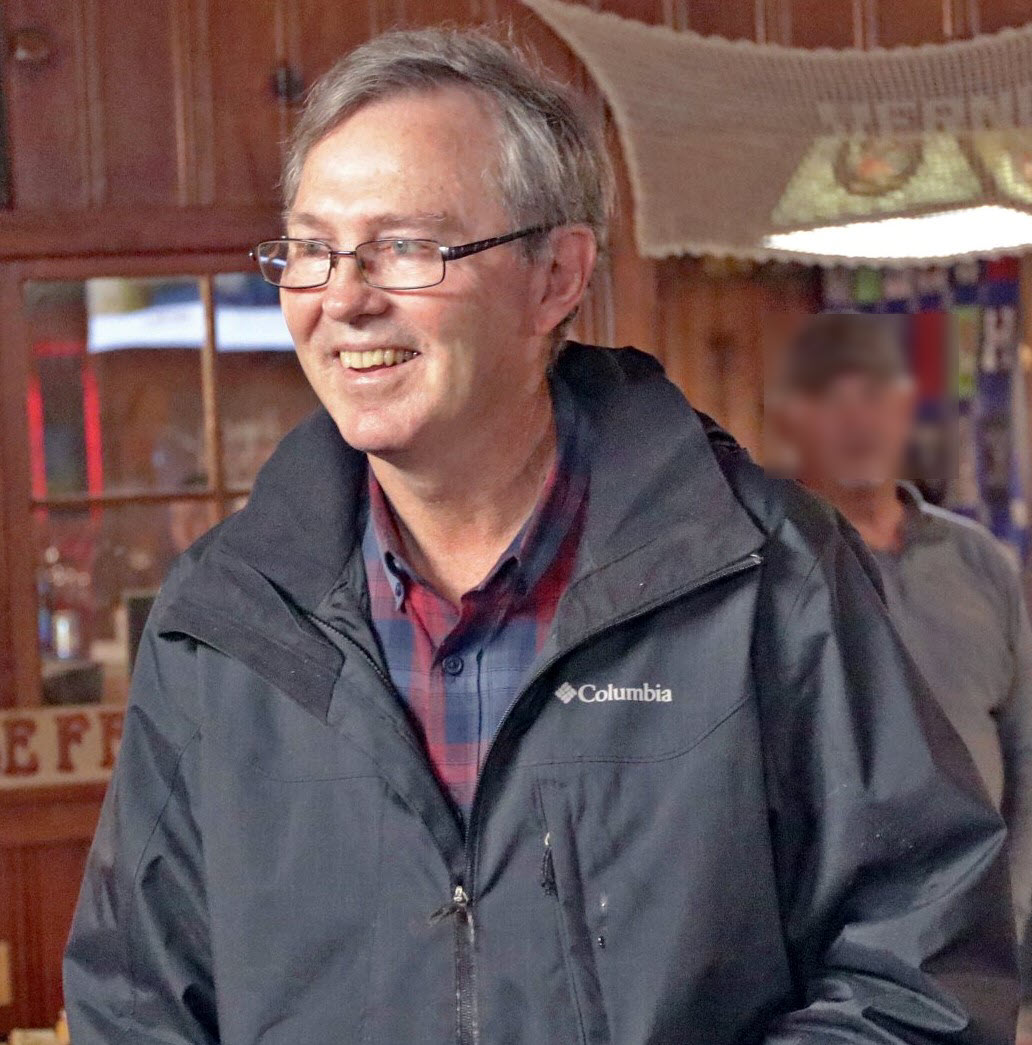
- Crosswhite in 2019

No. 17, 35
- Position: Running back

Personal information
- Born: April 28, 1951 (age 75); Hennessey, Oklahoma, U.S.
- Died: April 13, 2026; Oklahoma City, Oklahoma, U.S.
- Listed height: 6 ft 2 in (1.88 m)
- Listed weight: 215 lb (98 kg)

Career information
- College: Oklahoma
- NFL draft: 1973: 2nd round, 44th overall pick

Career history
- Detroit Lions (1973–1974); New England Patriots (1975–1976)

Awards and highlights
- First-team All-Big Eight (1972); Second-team All-Big Eight (1971)

Career NFL statistics
- Rushing attempts: 23
- Rushing yards: 79
- Rushing TDs: 2
- Stats at Pro Football Reference

Leon Crosswhite (born April 28, 1951) is an American former professional football player who was a running back in the National Football League (NFL). He played college football for the Oklahoma Sooners and was selected in the second round of the 1972 NFL draft.

== College career ==
Crosswhite attended University of Oklahoma and played for the Sooners as a running back in their wishbone formation from 1970 to 1973.

== NFL career ==
He played for the Detroit Lions from 1973 to 1974. He was selected in the second round by the Detroit Lions in the 1973 NFL draft. On January 28, 1975, Crosswhite was traded to the New England Patriots. On September 3, 1975 the Patriots placed Crosswhite on injured reserve.
