= 1972 Colorado Buffaloes football team =

American college football season

1972 Colorado Buffaloes football

Gator Bowl, L 3–24 vs. Auburn
- Conference: Big Eight Conference

Ranking
- Coaches: No. T–14
- AP: No. 16
- Record: 8–4 (4–3 Big 8)
- Head coach: Eddie Crowder (10th season)
- Offensive coordinator: Kay Dalton (1st season)
- Offensive scheme: Slot-I triple option
- Defensive coordinator: Dan Radakovich (1st season)
- Base defense: 4–4
- MVP: John Stearns
- Captains: Cullen Bryant; Rick Kay; Chuck Mandrill
- Home stadium: Folsom Field

1972 Big Eight Conference football standings
	Conf.					Overall
Team	W		L		T	W		L		T
No. 2 Oklahoma $	6	–	1	–	0	11	–	1	–	0
No. 4 Nebraska $	5	–	1	–	1	9	–	2	–	1
No. 16 Colorado	4	–	3	–	0	8	–	4	–	0
Oklahoma State	4	–	3	–	0	6	–	5	–	0
Missouri	3	–	4	–	0	6	–	6	–	0
Iowa State	2	–	4	–	1	5	–	6	–	1
Kansas	2	–	5	–	0	4	–	7	–	0
Kansas State	1	–	6	–	0	3	–	8	–	0
$ – Conference champion; The Big 8 Conference mandated Oklahoma forfeits in three conference games, giving Nebraska the title. Oklahoma reverted this record at a later date; hence, both Oklahoma and Nebraska claim this title.; Rankings from AP Poll

The 1973 Colorado Buffaloes football team represented the University of Colorado in the Big Eight Conference during the 1973 NCAA Division I football season. Led by tenth-year head coach Eddie Crowder, the Buffaloes were 8–3 in the regular season (4–3 in Big 8, tied for third), and played their home games on campus at Folsom Field in Boulder, Colorado.

In the Gator Bowl, Colorado fell to sixth-ranked Auburn to finish at 8–4, and dropped to sixteenth in the final AP poll.

== Schedule ==
Date	Time	Opponent	Rank	Site	TV	Result	Attendance	Source
September 9		California*	No. 2	Folsom Field; Boulder, CO		W 20–10	50,751	
September 16	1:30 p.m.	Cincinnati*	No. 2	Folsom Field; Boulder, CO		W 56–14	50,171	
September 23		at Minnesota*	No. 3	Memorial Stadium; Minneapolis, MN		W 38–6	42,703	
September 30		at Oklahoma State	No. 3	Lewis Field; Stillwater, OK		L 6–31	38,500	
October 7		at Kansas State	No. 12	KSU Stadium; Manhattan, KS (rivalry)		W 38–17	40,000	
October 14		No. 18 Iowa State^{†}	No. 13	Folsom Field; Boulder, CO		W 34–22	51,668	
October 21		No. 2 Oklahoma	No. 9	Folsom Field; Boulder, CO	ABC	W 20–14	52,022	
October 28		at Missouri	No. 7	Faurot Field; Columbia, MO		L 17–20	55,500	
November 4		No. 3 Nebraska	No. 15	Folsom Field; Boulder, CO (rivalry)	ABC	L 10–33	52,128	
November 11		Kansas	No. 16	Folsom Field; Boulder, CO		W 33–8	50,304	
November 18	1:02 p.m.	at Air Force*	No. 15	Falcon Stadium; Colorado Springs, CO		W 38–7	47,191	
December 30		vs. No. 6 Auburn*	No. 13	Gator Bowl Stadium; Jacksonville, FL (Gator Bowl)	ABC	L 3–24	71,114	
*Non-conference game; ^{†}Homecoming; Rankings from AP Poll released prior to the game

== Rankings ==
Ranking movements Legend: ██ Increase in ranking ██ Decrease in ranking т = Tied with team above or below ( ) = First-place votes
	Week														
Poll	Pre	1	2	3	4	5	6	7	8	9	10	11	12	13	Final
AP	2 (13)	2 (12)	3 (7)	3 (5)	12	13	9	7	15	16	15	13	13	13	16
Coaches	2 (4)	3 (6)	3 (4)	3 (1)	16	16	10	7	14	16 т	15	13	13	14 т	Not released

== Game summaries ==
=== Oklahoma ===
#2 Oklahoma at Colorado

Team	1	2	3	4	Total
Oklahoma	0	7	0	7	14
• Colorado	0	0	14	6	20

- Date: Saturday, October 22
- Location: Folsom Field, Boulder, Colorado
- Game attendance: 52,022
- Source: Ocala Star-Banner

Scoring summary
2	OKLA	Robertson 17 yard run (Fulcher kick)	OKLA 7-0
3	COL	Campbell 43 yard run (kick failed)	OKLA 7-6
3	COL	Keyworth 6 yard pass from Johnson (Matthews run)	COL 14-7
4	COL	Lima 33 yard field goal	COL 17-7
4	COL	Lima 33 yard field goal	COL 20-7
4	OKLA	Pruitt 10 yard pass from Robertson (Fulcher kick)	COL 20-14

== Roster ==
- TE J.V. Cain Jr.
