= 1973 Denver Broncos season =

American football team season

- Owner: Gerald Phipps
- General manager: John Ralston
- Head coach: John Ralston
- Home stadium: Mile High Stadium

Results
- Record: 7–5–2
- Division place: 3rd AFC West
- Playoffs: Did not qualify

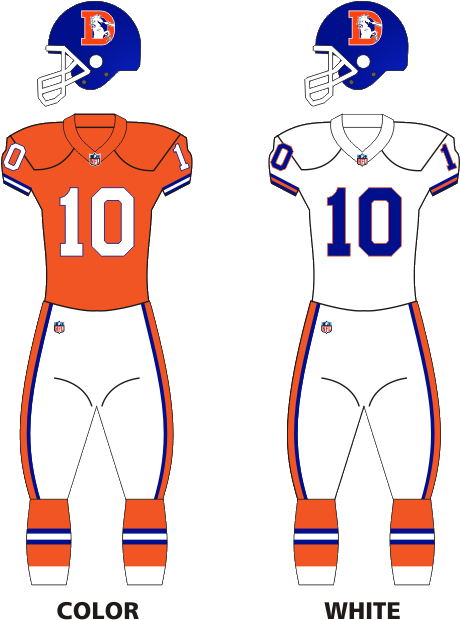
Uniforms worn by the Denver Broncos during 1973

The 1973 Denver Broncos season was the team's 14th year in professional football and its fourth with the National Football League (NFL). Led by second-year head coach and general manager John Ralston, the Broncos posted a winning record for the second time in franchise history, with seven wins, five losses, and two ties, which tied for sixth-best in the conference. It was only the second time in franchise history that they won more than five games. Their 7-2-1 record against conference opponents was the second best in the AFC, behind only the Miami Dolphins' 9-2. However, they finished 0-3-1 against NFC opponents. Denver tied for second in the AFC West (third with tiebreaker), 1½ games behind the Oakland Raiders.

After a 1-3 start, Denver went unbeaten in seven straight games. The last of these was a 14-10 win over Kansas City, only the third win in 28 games all-time vs. the Chiefs franchise. The win put the Broncos in first place in the division at 6-3-2. After a split of the next two games, the final game of the regular season was a 21-17 loss at Oakland, making the Raiders division champions.

One of the ties, in their first-ever game with the Cardinals, was the nearest Denver came to losing to that franchise until 2010, and also their only NFL appearance in St. Louis until 2000 against the relocated Rams at Edward Jones Dome.

To date, the 1973 Broncos along with the Kansas City Chiefs, Cleveland Browns, and Green Bay Packers are the last teams to record 2 ties in a single season. Overtime for regular season games was introduced the following year, and the occurrence of tie games decreased.

== Offseason ==
=== NFL draft ===
1973 Denver Broncos draft
Round	Pick	Player	Position	College	Notes
1	9	Otis Armstrong *	Running back	Purdue	
2	36	Barney Chavous	DE	South Carolina State	
3	54	Paul Howard	G	BYU	
3	70	John Wood	DT	LSU	
4	88	Tom Jackson *	LB	Louisville	
5	113	Charles McTorry	DB	Tennessee State	
7	165	Mike Askea	OT	Stanford	
7	166	John Grant	DT	USC	
9	217	Lyle Blackwood	DB	Texas Christian	
10	244	Al Marshall	WR	Boise State	
11	269	Elton Brown	DE	Utah State	
12	296	Jim O'Malley	LB	Notre Dame	
13	319	Ed Smith	DE	Colorado College	
13	321	Ed White	RB	Tulsa	
14	348	John Hufnagel	QB	Penn State	
15	373	Calvin Jones	DB	Washington	
16	398	Oliver Ross	RB	Alabama A&M	
16	400	Ken Muhlbeier	C	Idaho	
17	425	Kenneth Morgan	TE	Elon	
Made roster † Pro Football Hall of Fame * Made at least one Pro Bowl during career

== Personnel ==
=== Staff / Coaches ===
1973 Denver Broncos staff
Front office: Team Owner / Chairman of the Board – Gerald Phipps; Team President – Allan Phipps; Assistant General Manager/Director of Player Personnel – Fred Gehrke; Director of Scouting – Carroll Hardy; Head coaches: Vice President/General Manager/Head Coach – John Ralston; Offensive coaches: Offensive Coordinator/Backfield – Max Coley; Wide Receivers – Dick Coury; Offensive Line – Jerry Frei	Defensive coaches: Defensive Coordinator/Defensive Backs – Joe Collier; Defensive Line – Doc Urich; Linebackers – Bob Gambold; Special teams coaches: Special Teams – Myrel Moore

=== Roster ===
1973 Denver Broncos roster
Quarterbacks (QB): 14 John Hufnagel; 12 Charley Johnson; 10 Steve Ramsey; Running backs (RB): 11 Bobby Anderson; 24 Otis Armstrong; 33 Joe Dawkins; 44 Floyd Little; 30 Oliver Ross; Wide receivers (WR): 82 Jeff Baker; 25 Haven Moses; 80 Jerry Simmons; 42 Billy Van Heusen P; 84 Gene Washington; Tight ends (TE): 81 Billy Masters; 88 Riley Odoms	Offensive linemen (OL): 73 Mike Askea T; 74 Mike Current T; 60 Paul Howard G; 68 Larron Jackson G/T; 59 Larry Kaminski C; 61 Tommy Lyons G; 50 Bobby Maples C; 64 Mike Schnitker G; Defensive linemen (DL): 77 Lyle Alzado DE; 79 Barney Chavous DE; 55 Pete Duranko DT; 63 John Grant DT/DE; 62 Jerry Inman DT; 75 Ed Smith DE; 70 Paul Smith DT	Linebackers (LB): 53 Ken Criter MLB; 58 Tom Graham MLB; 57 Tom Jackson OLB; 45 Bill Laskey OLB; 56 Ray May OLB; 66 Jim O'Malley OLB; 51 Mike Simone OLB; Defensive backs (DB): 20 Charlie Greer FS; 43 Lonnie Hepburn CB; 26 Calvin Jones CB; 41 Leroy Mitchell CB; 21 Randy Montgomery CB; 48 John Pitts SS; 36 Bill Thompson SS; 23 Maurice Tyler FS; Special teams (ST): 15 Jim Turner K	Practice squad: None - N/A; Reserve: 76 Tom Domres DT (IR); -- Marv Frazier WR (IR); 67 George Goeddeke C (IR); 22 Fran Lynch RB (IR); 78 Marv Montgomery T (IR); 54 Chip Myrtle LB; Rookies in italics 45 active, 6 reserve, 0 practice squad

== Regular season ==
=== Schedule ===
Week	Date	Opponent	Result	Record	Venue	Attendance
1	September 16	Cincinnati Bengals	**W** 28–10	1–0	Mile High Stadium	49,059
2	September 23	San Francisco 49ers	**L** 34–36	1–1	Mile High Stadium	50,966
3	September 30	Chicago Bears	**L** 14–33	1–2	Mile High Stadium	51,159
4	October 7	at **Kansas City Chiefs**	**L** 14–16	1–3	Arrowhead Stadium	71,414
5	October 14	at Houston Oilers	**W** 48–20	2–3	Astrodome	32,801
6	October 22	**Oakland Raiders**	**T** 23–23	2–3–1	Mile High Stadium	51,270
7	October 28	at New York Jets	**W** 40–28	3–3–1	Shea Stadium	55,108
8	November 4	at St. Louis Cardinals	**T** 17–17	3–3–2	Busch Memorial Stadium	46,565
9	November 11	**San Diego Chargers**	**W** 30–19	4–3–2	Mile High Stadium	51,034
10	November 18	at Pittsburgh Steelers	**W** 23–13	5–3–2	Three Rivers Stadium	48,580
11	November 25	**Kansas City Chiefs**	**W** 14–10	6–3–2	Mile High Stadium	51,331
12	December 2	Dallas Cowboys	**L** 10–22	6–4–2	Mile High Stadium	51,508
13	December 9	at **San Diego Chargers**	**W** 42–28	7–4–2	San Diego Stadium	44,954
14	December 16	at **Oakland Raiders**	**L** 17–21	7–5–2	Oakland–Alameda County Coliseum	51,910
Note: Intra-division opponents are in **bold** text.

=== Game summaries ===
==== Week 2 (Sunday, September 23, 1973): vs. San Francisco 49ers ====
Week 2: San Francisco 49ers at Denver Broncos – Game summary

Quarter	1	2	3	4	Total
**49ers** (1–1)	0	20	10	6	**36**
Broncos (1–1)	10	3	7	14	**34**

at Mile High Stadium • Denver, Colorado

- Date: September 23
- Game time: 2:00 p.m. MDT
- Game attendance: 50,966
- Referee: John McDonough
- TV announcers (CBS): Don Criqui (play–by–play), Tommy Mason (color commentator) and Brent Musburger (studio reporter)

Team	Category	Player	Statistics
SF	Passing		
SF	Rushing		
SF	Receiving		
DEN	Passing		
DEN	Rushing		
DEN	Receiving		

Scoring summary

Quarter	Time	Drive			Team	Scoring information	Score	
Quarter	Time	Plays	Yards	TOP	Team	Scoring information	SF	DEN
"TOP" = time of possession. For other American football terms, see Glossary of American football.							36	34

- Point spread: Broncos +4
- Time of game:

49ers	Game statistics	Broncos
16	First downs	22
39–135	Rushes–yards	32–115
212	Passing yards	240
14–35–1	Passes	17–36–5
0–0	Sacked–yards	0–0
212	Net passing yards	240
347	Total yards	355
101	Return yards	114
6–46.0	Punts	4–35.8
2–0	Fumbles–lost	3–1
8–73	Penalties–yards	4–32
	Time of possession	

=== Week 10 at Steelers ===
Week Ten: Denver Broncos (4–3–2) at Pittsburgh Steelers (8–1)

Quarter	1	2	3	4	Total
**Broncos**	3	3	7	10	**23**
Steelers	3	3	0	7	**13**

at Three Rivers Stadium, Pittsburgh, Pennsylvania

- Date: November 18, 1973
- Game time: 1:00 p.m.
- Game weather: 35 °F (2 °C)
- Game attendance: 48,580
- Referee: Fred Silva
- Box Score

Team	Category	Player	Statistics
Broncos	Passing	Charley Johnson	13/20, 86 Yds, TD
Broncos	Rushing	Floyd Little	27 Rush, 88 Yds, TD
Broncos	Receiving	Riley Odoms	6 Rec, 47 Yds, TD
Steelers	Passing	Terry Hanratty	10/19, 217 Yds, TD
Steelers	Rushing	Franco Harris	11 Rush, 53 Yds
Steelers	Receiving	John McMakin	3 Rec, 64 Yds

Scoring summary

Quarter	Time	Drive			Team	Scoring information	Score	
Quarter	Time	Plays	Yards	TOP	Team	Scoring information	DEN	PIT
1					Broncos	32-yard field goal by Jim Turner	3	0
1					Steelers	15-yard field goal by Roy Gerela	3	3
2					Steelers	13-yard field goal by Roy Gerela	3	6
2					Broncos	11-yard field goal by Jim Turner	6	6
3					Broncos	Floyd Little 10-yard touchdown run, Jim Turner kick good	13	6
4					Steelers	Ron Shanklin 42-yard touchdown reception from Terry Hanratty, Roy Gerela kick good	13	13
4					Broncos	46-yard field goal by Jim Turner	16	13
4					Broncos	Riley Odoms 2-yard touchdown reception from Charley Johnson, Jim Turner kick good	23	13
"TOP" = time of possession. For other American football terms, see Glossary of American football.							23	13

=== Standings ===
AFC West
	W	L	T	PCT	DIV	CONF	PF	PA	STK
Oakland Raiders	9	4	1	.679	4–1–1	7–3–1	292	175	W4
Kansas City Chiefs	7	5	2	.571	4–2	6–4–1	231	192	W1
Denver Broncos	7	5	2	.571	3–2–1	7–2–1	354	296	L1
San Diego Chargers	2	11	1	.179	0–6	1–9–1	188	386	L4

== Awards and honors ==
- UPI AFC Coach of the Year: John Ralston
