= 1972 Memphis State Tigers football team =

American college football season

1972 Memphis State Tigers football
- Conference: Missouri Valley Conference
- Record: 5–5–1 (3–2 MVC)
- Head coach: Fred Pancoast (1st season)
- Home stadium: Memphis Memorial Stadium

1972 Missouri Valley Conference football standings
| | Conf. | | | | | Overall |
| Team | W | | L | | T | W | | L | | T |
|---|---|---|---|---|---|---|---|---|---|---|
| No. 18 Louisville + | 4 | – | 1 | – | 0 | 9 | – | 1 | – | 0 |
| Drake + | 4 | – | 1 | – | 0 | 7 | – | 5 | – | 0 |
| West Texas State + | 4 | – | 1 | – | 0 | 5 | – | 5 | – | 0 |
| Memphis State | 3 | – | 2 | – | 0 | 5 | – | 5 | – | 1 |
| Tulsa | 3 | – | 2 | – | 0 | 4 | – | 7 | – | 0 |
| Wichita State | 2 | – | 4 | – | 0 | 6 | – | 5 | – | 0 |
| New Mexico State | 1 | – | 4 | – | 0 | 2 | – | 9 | – | 0 |
| North Texas State | 0 | – | 7 | – | 0 | 1 | – | 10 | – | 0 |
+ – Conference co-champions; West Texas State's game against Colorado State, Tulsa's game against TCU, and New Mexico State's game against New Mexico counted in the conference standings.; Rankings from AP Poll

The 1972 Memphis State Tigers football team represented Memphis State University (now known as the University of Memphis) as a member of the Missouri Valley Conference (MVC) during the 1972 NCAA University Division football season. In its first season under head coach Fred Pancoast, the team compiled an overall record of 5–5–1 record with a mark of 3–2 against conference opponents, tied for fourth place in the MVC, and outscored all opponents by a total of 265 to 254. The team played its home games at Memphis Memorial Stadium in Memphis, Tennessee.

The team's statistical leaders included Al Harvey with 961 passing yards, Dornell Harris with 698 rushing yards, Stan Davis with 476 receiving yards, and Dan Darby with 42 points scored.

== Schedule ==
| Date | Time | Opponent | Site | Result | Attendance | Source |
|---|---|---|---|---|---|---|
| September 16 | | No. 19 Ole Miss* | Memphis Memorial Stadium; Memphis, TN (rivalry) | L 29–34 | 51,174 | |
| September 23 | | Drake | Memphis Memorial Stadium; Memphis, TN | L 7–23 | 19,424 | |
| September 30 | 6:30 p.m. | at South Carolina* | Carolina Stadium; Columbia, SC | L 7–34 | 37,893 | |
| October 7 | | No. 10 Tennessee* | Memphis Memorial Stadium; Memphis, TN | L 7–38 | 50,201 | |
| October 14 | | Utah State*^{†} | Memphis Memorial Stadium; Memphis, TN | W 38–29 | 17,760 | |
| October 21 | 1:30 p.m. | at North Texas State* | Texas Stadium; Irving, TX | W 7–6 | 3,000 | |
| October 28 | | Tulsa | Memphis Memorial Stadium; Memphis, TN | W 49–21 | 21,736 | |
| November 4 | | Wichita State | Memphis Memorial Stadium; Memphis, TN | W 58–14 | 15,601 | |
| November 11 | | Cincinnati | Memphis Memorial Stadium; Memphis, TN (rivalry) | W 49–24 | 16,050 | |
| November 18 | 7:00 p.m. | Louisville | Fairgrounds Stadium; Louisville, KY (rivalry) | L 0–17 | 18,218 | |
| December 2 | | vs. Southern Miss* | Mississippi Veterans Memorial Stadium; Jackson, MS (rivalry) | T 14–14 | 15,000 | |
*Non-conference game; ^{†}Homecoming; Rankings from AP Poll released prior to the game; All times are in Central time
