= 1972 Wichita State Shockers football team =

American college football season

1972 Wichita State Shockers football
- Conference: Missouri Valley Conference
- Record: 6–5 (2–4 MVC)
- Head coach: Bob Seaman (3rd season)
- Home stadium: Cessna Stadium

1972 Missouri Valley Conference football standings
	Conf.					Overall
Team	W		L		T	W		L		T
No. 18 Louisville +	4	–	1	–	0	9	–	1	–	0
Drake +	4	–	1	–	0	7	–	5	–	0
West Texas State +	4	–	1	–	0	5	–	5	–	0
Memphis State	3	–	2	–	0	5	–	5	–	1
Tulsa	3	–	2	–	0	4	–	7	–	0
Wichita State	2	–	4	–	0	6	–	5	–	0
New Mexico State	1	–	4	–	0	2	–	9	–	0
North Texas State	0	–	7	–	0	1	–	10	–	0
+ – Conference co-champions; West Texas State's game against Colorado State, Tulsa's game against TCU, and New Mexico State's game against New Mexico counted in the conference standings.; Rankings from AP Poll

The 1972 Wichita Shockers football team was an American football team that represented Wichita State University as a member of the Missouri Valley Conference (MVC) during the 1972 NCAA University Division football season. In its third season under head coach Bob Seaman, the team compiled a 6–5 record (2–4 against conference opponents), finished in sixth place out of eight teams in the MVC and was outscored by a total of 228 to 156. The team played its home games at Cessna Stadium in Wichita, Kansas.

The 1972 season was the Shockers' first with a winning record since 1963. In the seven prior seasons, the program had compiled an 11–57 record and sustained tragedy in the 1970 Wichita State University football team plane crash.

The team's statistical leaders included Tom Owen with 689 passing yards, Don Gilley with 446 rushing yards, Eddie Plopa with 269 receiving yards, and Don Burford and Don Gilley with 24 points each.

== Schedule ==
Date	Time	Opponent	Site	Result	Attendance	Source
September 9	7:30 p.m.	Texas A&M*	Cessna Stadium; Wichita, KS	L 13–36	22,659	
September 16	1:30 p.m.	at Tulsa	Skelly Stadium; Tulsa, OK	L 9–10	21,000	
September 23	7:30 p.m.	at Arkansas State*	Kays Stadium; Jonesboro, AR	W 6–0	6,500	
September 30	7:30 p.m.	Southern Illinois*	Cessna Stadium; Wichita, KS	W 12–0	17,046	
October 7	7:30 p.m.	North Texas State	Cessna Stadium; Wichita, KS	W 23–6	18,257	
October 14	7:30 p.m.	Cincinnati*	Cessna Stadium; Wichita, KS	W 20–17	15,916	
October 21	7:30 p.m.	Louisville	Cessna Stadium; Wichita, KS	L 3–46	22,521	
October 28	7:30 p.m.	at West Texas State	Kimbrough Memorial Stadium; Canyon, TX	L 16–21	12,400	
November 4		at Memphis State	Memphis Memorial Stadium; Memphis, TN	L 14–58	15,601	
November 11	2:00 p.m.	Trinity (TX)*	Cessna Stadium; Wichita, KS	W 17–14	17,171	
November 18	8:33 p.m.	at New Mexico State	Memorial Stadium; Las Cruces, NM	W 23–20	2,001	
*Non-conference game; All times are in Central time
