= 1972 Drake Bulldogs football team =

American college football season

1972 Drake Bulldogs football

MVC co-champion

Pioneer Bowl, L 7–29 vs. Tennessee State
- Conference: Missouri Valley Conference
- Record: 7–5 (4–1 MVC)
- Head coach: Jack Wallace (8th season)
- Home stadium: Drake Stadium

1972 Missouri Valley Conference football standings
	Conf.					Overall
Team	W		L		T	W		L		T
No. 18 Louisville +	4	–	1	–	0	9	–	1	–	0
Drake +	4	–	1	–	0	7	–	5	–	0
West Texas State +	4	–	1	–	0	5	–	5	–	0
Memphis State	3	–	2	–	0	5	–	5	–	1
Tulsa	3	–	2	–	0	4	–	7	–	0
Wichita State	2	–	4	–	0	6	–	5	–	0
New Mexico State	1	–	4	–	0	2	–	9	–	0
North Texas State	0	–	7	–	0	1	–	10	–	0
+ – Conference co-champions; West Texas State's game against Colorado State, Tulsa's game against TCU, and New Mexico State's game against New Mexico counted in the conference standings.; Rankings from AP Poll

The 1972 Drake Bulldogs football team represented Drake University during the 1972 NCAA University Division football season. It was the seventy-ninth year for the football program. The season ended with a 7–5 record, capturing the Missouri Valley Conference championship. The Bulldogs participated in the 1972 Pioneer Bowl.

== Schedule ==
Date	Time	Opponent	Rank	Site	Result	Attendance	Source
September 16	1:30 p.m.	West Texas State		Drake Stadium; Des Moines, IA	W 42–12	17,100	
September 23		at Memphis State		Liberty Bowl Memorial Stadium; Memphis, TN	W 23–7	19,424	
September 30	1:30 p.m.	North Texas State	No. 8	Drake Stadium; Des Moines, IA	W 54–8	15,500	
October 7	1:30 p.m.	at South Dakota*	No. 5	Inman Field; Vermillion, SD	L 23–28	8,000	
October 14		Northern Iowa*		Drake Stadium; Des Moines, IA	W 21–14	7,200	
October 21	7:02 p.m.	at Tampa*	No. 9	Tampa Stadium; Tampa, FL	L 7–24	15,240	
October 28	1:32 p.m.	New Mexico State		Drake Stadium; Des Moines, IA	W 28–10	14,000	
November 4	3:30 p.m.	Southern Illinois*		Drake Stadium; Des Moines, IA	W 19–9	10,000–12,300	
November 11	1:30 p.m.	Northeast Louisiana*		Drake Stadium; Des Moines, IA	W 35–7	9,000–10,500	
November 18	8:30 p.m.	at Idaho State*	No. 10	ASISU Minidome; Pocatello, ID	L 21–24	9,200	
November 25	7:02 p.m.	at Louisville		Fairgrounds Stadium; Louisville, KY	L 0–27	14,012	
December 9		vs. No. 5 Tennessee State*		Memorial Stadium; Wichita Falls, TX (Pioneer Bowl)	L 21–29	9,200	
*Non-conference game; Rankings from AP Poll released prior to the game; All times are in Central time
