= 1972 North Texas State Mean Green football team =

American college football season

1972 North Texas State Mean Green football
- Conference: Missouri Valley Conference
- Record: 1–10 (0–7 MVC)
- Head coach: Rod Rust (6th season)
- Home stadium: Fouts Field; Texas Stadium

1972 Missouri Valley Conference football standings
	Conf.					Overall
Team	W		L		T	W		L		T
No. 18 Louisville +	4	–	1	–	0	9	–	1	–	0
Drake +	4	–	1	–	0	7	–	5	–	0
West Texas State +	4	–	1	–	0	5	–	5	–	0
Memphis State	3	–	2	–	0	5	–	5	–	1
Tulsa	3	–	2	–	0	4	–	7	–	0
Wichita State	2	–	4	–	0	6	–	5	–	0
New Mexico State	1	–	4	–	0	2	–	9	–	0
North Texas State	0	–	7	–	0	1	–	10	–	0
+ – Conference co-champions; West Texas State's game against Colorado State, Tulsa's game against TCU, and New Mexico State's game against New Mexico counted in the conference standings.; Rankings from AP Poll

The 1972 North Texas State Mean Green football team was an American football team that represented North Texas State University (now known as the University of North Texas) during the 1972 NCAA University Division football season as a member of the Missouri Valley Conference. In their sixth year under head coach Rod Rust, the team compiled a 1–10 record.

== Schedule ==
Date	Time	Opponent	Site	Result	Attendance	Source
September 16	9:30 p.m.	at Long Beach State*	Falcon Stadium; Norwalk, CA	L 21–24	4,972	
September 23	7:30 p.m.	San Diego State*	Texas Stadium; Irving, TX	L 0–25	10,500	
September 30	1:30 p.m.	at No. 8 (small) Drake	Drake Stadium; Des Moines, IA	L 8–54	15,500	
October 7	7:30 p.m.	at Wichita State	Cessna Stadium; Wichita, KS	L 6–23	18,257	
October 14	1:02 p.m.	at Louisville	Fairgrounds Stadium; Louisville, KY	L 6–56	18,041	
October 21	1:30 p.m.	Memphis State	Texas Stadium; Irving, TX	L 6–7	3,000	
October 28	7:30 p.m.	at No. T–18 Arkansas*	War Memorial Stadium; Little Rock, AR	L 16–42	48,735	
November 4	7:30 p.m.	Cincinnati*	Texas Stadium; Irving, TX	W 27–25	3,000	
November 11	2:00 p.m.	New Mexico State^{†}	Fouts Field; Denton, TX	L 22–36	11,000	
November 18	7:30 p.m.	West Texas State	Texas Stadium; Irving, TX	L 14–17	2,500	
November 25	1:30 p.m.	at Tulsa	Skelly Stadium; Tulsa, OK	L 22–45	5,000	
*Non-conference game; ^{†}Homecoming; Rankings from AP Poll released prior to the game; All times are in Central time
