= 1972 Tulsa Golden Hurricane football team =

American college football season

1972 Tulsa Golden Hurricane football
- Conference: Missouri Valley Conference
- Record: 4–7 (3–2 MVC)
- Head coach: Claude "Hoot" Gibson (3rd season; first 6 games); F. A. Dry (1st season, final 5 games)
- Home stadium: Skelly Stadium

1972 Missouri Valley Conference football standings
	Conf.					Overall
Team	W		L		T	W		L		T
No. 18 Louisville +	4	–	1	–	0	9	–	1	–	0
Drake +	4	–	1	–	0	7	–	5	–	0
West Texas State +	4	–	1	–	0	5	–	5	–	0
Memphis State	3	–	2	–	0	5	–	5	–	1
Tulsa	3	–	2	–	0	4	–	7	–	0
Wichita State	2	–	4	–	0	6	–	5	–	0
New Mexico State	1	–	4	–	0	2	–	9	–	0
North Texas State	0	–	7	–	0	1	–	10	–	0
+ – Conference co-champions; West Texas State's game against Colorado State, Tulsa's game against TCU, and New Mexico State's game against New Mexico counted in the conference standings.; Rankings from AP Poll

The 1972 Tulsa Golden Hurricane football team represented the University of Tulsa as a member of the Missouri Valley Conference (MVC) during the 1972 NCAA University Division football season. The Golden Hurricane compiled an overall record of 4–7 record with a mark of 3–2 in conference play, tying for fourth place in the MVC. The team began the season in its third year under Claude "Hoot" Gibson and went 1–5 in games under Gibson. After six games, Gibson was fired and replaced by F. A. Dry, who led the team to a record of 3–2 over the final five games of the season.

The team's statistical leaders included Todd Starks with 1,201 passing yards, Ed White with 675 rushing yards, and Drew Pearson with 690 receiving yards. Pearson went on to play 11 seasons for the Dallas Cowboys and is a member of the Pro Football Hall of Fame.

== Schedule ==
Date	Time	Opponent	Site	Result	Attendance	Source
September 9		at Kansas State*	KSU Stadium; Manhattan, KS	L 13–21	28,000	
September 16	1:30 p.m.	Wichita State	Skelly Stadium; Tulsa, OK	W 10–9	21,000	
September 23		Houston*	Skelly Stadium; Tulsa, OK	L 0–21	23,200	
September 30		at Arkansas*	Razorback Stadium; Fayetteville, AR	L 20–21	40,003	
October 7		at Texas Tech*	Jones Stadium; Lubbock, TX	L 18–35	34,175	
October 14		TCU (Note: Designated conference game)	Skelly Stadium; Tulsa, OK	L 9–35	18,500	
October 28		at Memphis State	Memphis Memorial Stadium; Memphis, TN	L 21–49	21,736	
November 4	7:01 p.m.	at No. 17 Louisville	Fairgrounds Stadium; Louisville, KY	W 28–26	24,000	
November 11		at Florida State*	Doak Campbell Stadium; Tallahassee, FL	L 21–23	24,016	
November 18		Montana*^{†}	Skelly Stadium; Tulsa, OK	W 10–7	3,000–10,000	
November 25	1:30 p.m.	North Texas State	Skelly Stadium; Tulsa, OK	W 45–22	5,000	
*Non-conference game; ^{†}Homecoming; Rankings from AP Poll released prior to the game; All times are in Central time

== Roster ==
1972 Tulsa Golden Hurricane football team roster
Players
Coaches
Offense

Pos.	#	Name	Class
TE	89	T. C. Blair	Jr
WR	5	Leonard Isabell	So
G	62	John Lee	So
G	63	Lynn Lee	So
WR	3	Drew Pearson	Sr
WR	21	Ray Rhodes	Jr
QB	9	Todd Starks	Sr
RB	32	Ed White	Sr

Defense

Pos.	#	Name	Class
DB	44	Danny Colbert	Jr
LB	99	Al Humphrey	So
DT	75	Arthur Moore	Sr
DE	83	Rick Russell	Sr
DB	6	Drane Scrivener	Sr

Special teams

Pos.	#	Name	Class

Head coach

- F. A. Dry

Coordinators/assistant coaches

Legend

- (C) Team captain
- (S) Suspended
- (I) Ineligible
- Injured
- Redshirt

== After the season ==
=== 1973 NFL draft ===
The following Golden Hurricane players were selected in the [[973 NFL draft}]] following the season.

Round	Pick	Player	Position	NFL club
4	98	Drane Scrivener	Defensive back	Dallas Cowboys
6	149	Arthur Moore	Nose tackle	San Francisco 49ers
13	321	Ed White	Running back	Denver Broncos
