= 1972 New Mexico State Aggies football team =

American college football season

1972 New Mexico State Aggies football
- Conference: Missouri Valley Conference
- Record: 2–9 (1–4 MVC)
- Head coach: Jim Wood (5th season)
- Home stadium: Memorial Stadium

1972 Missouri Valley Conference football standings
	Conf.					Overall
Team	W		L		T	W		L		T
No. 18 Louisville +	4	–	1	–	0	9	–	1	–	0
Drake +	4	–	1	–	0	7	–	5	–	0
West Texas State +	4	–	1	–	0	5	–	5	–	0
Memphis State	3	–	2	–	0	5	–	5	–	1
Tulsa	3	–	2	–	0	4	–	7	–	0
Wichita State	2	–	4	–	0	6	–	5	–	0
New Mexico State	1	–	4	–	0	2	–	9	–	0
North Texas State	0	–	7	–	0	1	–	10	–	0
+ – Conference co-champions; West Texas State's game against Colorado State, Tulsa's game against TCU, and New Mexico State's game against New Mexico counted in the conference standings.; Rankings from AP Poll

The 1972 New Mexico State Aggies football team was an American football team that represented New Mexico State University in the Missouri Valley Conference during the 1972 NCAA University Division football season. In their fifth year under head coach Jim Wood, the Aggies compiled a 2–9 record. The team played home games at Memorial Stadium in Las Cruces, New Mexico.

== Schedule ==
Date	Time	Opponent	Site	Result	Attendance	Source
September 9		Utah State*	Memorial Stadium; Las Cruces, NM	L 14–48	13,225	
September 16		at New Mexico (Note: Designated conference game)	University Stadium; Albuquerque, NM (rivalry)	L 20–55	24,421	
September 23		Fresno State*	Memorial Stadium; Las Cruces, NM	L 17–49	8,053	
September 30		at UTEP*	Sun Bowl; El Paso, TX (rivalry)	L 20–21	11,300	
October 7		at SMU*	Texas Stadium; Irving, TX	L 6–55	27,221	
October 14	7:30 p.m.	at West Texas State	Kimbrough Memorial Stadium; Canyon, TX	L 14–63	15,600	
October 21	7:30 p.m.	UT Arlington*	Memorial Stadium; Las Cruces, NM	W 17–12	7,255	
October 28	12:32 p.m.	at Drake	Drake Stadium; Des Moines, IA	L 10–28	14,000	
November 4		Lamar*	Memorial Stadium; Las Cruces, NM	L 19–24	5,353	
November 11	1:00 p.m.	at North Texas State	Fouts Field; Denton, TX	W 36–22	11,000	
November 18	7:33 p.m.	Wichita State	Memorial Stadium; Las Cruces, NM	L 20–23	2,001	
*Non-conference game; All times are in Mountain time
