= 1972 Louisville Cardinals football team =

American college football season

1972 Louisville Cardinals football

MVC co-champion
- Conference: Missouri Valley Conference

Ranking
- Coaches: No. 16
- AP: No. 18
- Record: 9–1 (4–1 MVC)
- Head coach: Lee Corso (4th season)
- Home stadium: Fairgrounds Stadium

1972 Missouri Valley Conference football standings
	Conf.					Overall
Team	W		L		T	W		L		T
No. 18 Louisville +	4	–	1	–	0	9	–	1	–	0
Drake +	4	–	1	–	0	7	–	5	–	0
West Texas State +	4	–	1	–	0	5	–	5	–	0
Memphis State	3	–	2	–	0	5	–	5	–	1
Tulsa	3	–	2	–	0	4	–	7	–	0
Wichita State	2	–	4	–	0	6	–	5	–	0
New Mexico State	1	–	4	–	0	2	–	9	–	0
North Texas State	0	–	7	–	0	1	–	10	–	0
+ – Conference co-champions; West Texas State's game against Colorado State, Tulsa's game against TCU, and New Mexico State's game against New Mexico counted in the conference standings.; Rankings from AP Poll

The 1972 Louisville Cardinals football team represented the University of Louisville in the Missouri Valley Conference (MVC) during the 1972 NCAA University Division football season. In their fourth season and final season under head coach Lee Corso, the Cardinals compiled a 9–1 record (4–1 MVC, tied first), and were ranked eighteenth in the final AP Poll. The season ended with some controversy when Louisville was not extended a bowl invitation despite a 9–1 record, a sixteen UPI ranking, and a 34–0 victory over Tangerine Bowl bound Kent State (6–3–1) earlier that year.

Corso's overall record in four seasons was 28–11–3 (.702). After the season in early January, he left for Indiana in the Big Ten Conference, and assistant T. W. Alley, age 30, was promoted to head coach.

== Schedule ==
Date	Time	Opponent	Rank	Site	Result	Attendance	Source
September 16	8:00 p.m.	Kent State*		Fairgrounds Stadium; Louisville, KY	W 34–0	20,122	
September 30	7:30 p.m.	at Dayton*		Baujan Field; Dayton, OH	W 28–11	11,214	
October 7	8:00 p.m.	at Tampa*		Tampa Stadium; Tampa, FL	W 17–14	19,437	
October 14	2:02 p.m.	North Texas State		Fairgrounds Stadium; Louisville, KY	W 56–6	18,041	
October 21	8:30 p.m.	at Wichita State		Cessna Stadium; Wichita, KS	W 46–3	22,521	
October 28	2:00 p.m.	at Cincinnati*		Nippert Stadium; Cincinnati, OH (The Keg of Nails)	W 38–13	11,261	
November 4	8:01 p.m.	Tulsa	No. 17	Fairgrounds Stadium; Louisville, KY	L 26–28	24,000	
November 11		at Southern Illinois*		McAndrew Stadium; Carbondale, IL	W 20–16	5,800	
November 18	8:01 p.m.	Memphis State		Fairgrounds Stadium; Louisville, KY (rivalry)	W 17–0	18,218	
November 25	8:02 p.m.	Drake		Fairgrounds Stadium; Louisville, KY	W 27–0	14,012	
*Non-conference game; Rankings from AP Poll released prior to the game; All times are in Eastern time
