= 1972 West Texas State Buffaloes football team =

American college football season

1972 West Texas State Buffaloes football

MVC co-champion
- Conference: Missouri Valley Conference
- Record: 5–5 (4–1 MVC)
- Head coach: Gene Mayfield (2nd season)
- Home stadium: Kimbrough Memorial Stadium

1972 Missouri Valley Conference football standings
	Conf.					Overall
Team	W		L		T	W		L		T
No. 18 Louisville +	4	–	1	–	0	9	–	1	–	0
Drake +	4	–	1	–	0	7	–	5	–	0
West Texas State +	4	–	1	–	0	5	–	5	–	0
Memphis State	3	–	2	–	0	5	–	5	–	1
Tulsa	3	–	2	–	0	4	–	7	–	0
Wichita State	2	–	4	–	0	6	–	5	–	0
New Mexico State	1	–	4	–	0	2	–	9	–	0
North Texas State	0	–	7	–	0	1	–	10	–	0
+ – Conference co-champions; West Texas State's game against Colorado State, Tulsa's game against TCU, and New Mexico State's game against New Mexico counted in the conference standings.; Rankings from AP Poll

The 1972 West Texas State Buffaloes football team was an American football team that represented West Texas State University—now known as West Texas A&M University—as a member of the Missouri Valley Conference (MVC) during the 1972 NCAA University Division football season. In their second year under head coach Gene Mayfield, the Buffaloes compiled an overall record of 5–5 with a mark of 4–1 in conference play, sharing the MVC with Drake and Louisville.

== Schedule ==
Date	Time	Opponent	Site	Result	Attendance	Source
September 16	1:30 p.m.	at Drake	Drake Stadium; Des Moines, IA	L 12–42	17,100	
September 23	7:30 p.m.	Colorado State (Note: Designated conference game)	Kimbrough Memorial Stadium; Canyon, TX	W 41–14	14,750	
September 30	7:30 p.m.	Lamar*	Kimbrough Memorial Stadium; Canyon, TX	W 35–12	16,500	
October 7	7:33 p.m.	at Southern Miss*	Faulkner Field; Hattiesburg, MS	L 7–14	11,500	
October 14	7:30 p.m.	New Mexico State^{†}	Kimbrough Memorial Stadium; Canyon, TX	W 63–14	15,600	
October 21	1:30 p.m.	at Northern Illinois*	Huskie Stadium; DeKalb, IL	L 8–17	2,480	
October 28	7:30 p.m.	Wichita State	Kimbrough Memorial Stadium; Canyon, TX	W 21–16	12,400	
November 4	10:00 p.m.	at San Diego State*	San Diego Stadium; San Diego, CA	L 6–37	23,000–23,206	
November 11	2:00 p.m.	at UT Arlington*	Arlington Stadium; Arlington, TX	L 7–20	8,600	
November 18	7:30 p.m.	at North Texas State	Texas Stadium; Irving, TX	W 17–14	2,500	
*Non-conference game; ^{†}Homecoming; All times are in Central time
