= 1972 San Diego State Aztecs football team =

American college football season

1972 San Diego State Aztecs football

PCAA champion
- Conference: Pacific Coast Athletic Association

Ranking
- Coaches: No. 20
- Record: 10–1 (4–0 PCAA)
- Head coach: Don Coryell (12th season)
- Offensive coordinator: Rod Dowhower (5th season)
- Offensive scheme: Air Coryell
- Defensive coordinator: Claude Gilbert (4th season)
- Base defense: 4–3
- Home stadium: San Diego Stadium

1972 Pacific Coast Athletic Association football standings
	Conf.					Overall
Team	W		L		T	W		L		T
San Diego State $	4	–	0	–	0	10	–	1	–	0
Pacific (CA)	3	–	1	–	0	8	–	3	–	0
Fresno State	1	–	3	–	0	6	–	4	–	1
Long Beach State	1	–	3	–	0	5	–	6	–	0
San Jose State	1	–	3	–	0	4	–	7	–	0
Cal State Los Angeles*	0	–	0	–	0	3	–	7	–	0
$ – Conference champion; * – Did not compete for conference title

The 1972 San Diego State Aztecs football team represented California State University San Diego (Note: San Diego State University was known as California State University, San Diego from 1972 to 1973.) during the 1972 NCAA University Division football season as a member of the Pacific Coast Athletic Association (PCAA). (Note: The Big West Conference was known as the Pacific Coast Athletic Association from its founding in 1969 through 1987.)

The Aztecs were led by head coach Don Coryell, in his twelfth (and final) year, and played home games at San Diego Stadium (Note: San Diego County Credit Union Stadium (SDCCU Stadium) was known as San Diego Stadium from its opening in 1967 through 1980.) in San Diego, California. They finished the season as conference champion, with a record of ten wins and one loss (10–1, 4–0 PCAA).

Coryell had an overall record of 104–19–2 (.840) in twelve seasons. The total wins, winning percentage, and games coached are all San Diego State coaching records. He was elected to the College Football Hall of Fame in 1999 and was the first coach to win more than 100 games at both the collegiate and professional level.

After the season, Coryell left to become the head coach of the St. Louis Cardinals in the National Football League (NFL).

== Schedule ==
Date	Time	Opponent	Site	Result	Attendance	Source
September 9		Oregon State*	San Diego Stadium; San Diego, CA	W 17–8	32,829	
September 23	5:30 p.m.	at North Texas State*	Texas Stadium; Irving, TX	W 25–0	10,500	
September 30	10:30 a.m.	at Kent State*	Memorial Stadium; Kent, OH	W 14–0	5,415–5,421	
October 7	7:30 p.m.	San Jose State	San Diego Stadium; San Diego, CA	W 23–12	35,030	
October 14		at Houston*	Jeppesen Stadium; Houston, TX	L 14–49	29,891	
October 21		Bowling Green*	San Diego Stadium; San Diego, CA	W 35–19	36,121	
October 28		Fresno State	San Diego Stadium; San Diego, CA (rivalry)	W 21–14	23,653	
November 4	8:00 p.m.	West Texas State*	San Diego Stadium; San Diego, CA	W 37–6	23,000–23,206	
November 11	7:30 p.m.	Pacific (CA)	San Diego Stadium; San Diego, CA	W 20–7	25,000–25,838	
November 25	7:30 p.m.	at Long Beach State	Anaheim Stadium; Anaheim, CA	W 33–14	17,644	
December 2		Iowa State*	San Diego Stadium; San Diego, CA	W 27–14	39,048	
*Non-conference game; All times are in Pacific time

== Team players in the NFL ==
The following were selected in the 1973 NFL draft.

Player	Position	Round	Overall	NFL team
Isaac Curtis	Wide receiver	1	15	Cincinnati Bengals
Bill Ferguson	Linebacker	4	90	New York Jets
Jim Peterson	Linebacker	6	133	Los Angeles Rams
Joe Lavender	Defensive back	12	288	Philadelphia Eagles

The following finished their college career in 1972, were not drafted, but played in the NFL.

Player	Position	First NFL Team
Bill Donckers	Quarterback	1976 St. Louis Cardinals

== Team awards ==
Award	Player
Most Valuable Player (John Simcox Memorial Trophy)	Isaac Curtis
Outstanding Offensive & Defensive Linemen (Byron H. Chase Memorial Trophy)	Chris Miller, Off; Randy Bixler, Def
Team captains Dr. R. Hardy / C.E. Peterson Memorial Trophy	Bill Donckers, Off; Bill Ferguson, Def
Most Inspirational Player	Bill Ferguson
