= 1972 Idaho Vandals football team =

American college football season

1972 Idaho Vandals football
- Conference: Big Sky Conference
- Record: 4–7 (2–3 Big Sky)
- Head coach: Don Robbins (3rd season)
- Offensive coordinator: Bobby Thompson (4th season)
- Defensive coordinator: Ray Fulton (3rd season)
- Base defense: 5–2
- Captains: Rand Marquess; Kent Muhlbeier
- Home stadium: Idaho Stadium

1972 Big Sky Conference football standings
	Conf.					Overall
Team	W		L		T	W		L		T
Montana State $	5	–	1	–	0	8	–	3	–	0
Idaho State	4	–	1	–	0	7	–	3	–	0
Boise State	3	–	3	–	0	7	–	4	–	0
Montana	3	–	3	–	0	3	–	8	–	0
Idaho	2	–	3	–	0	4	–	7	–	0
Weber State	2	–	4	–	0	5	–	5	–	0
Northern Arizona	0	–	4	–	0	3	–	8	–	0
$ – Conference champion

The 1972 Idaho Vandals football team represented the University of Idaho in the 1972 NCAA University Division football season. The Vandals were led by third-year head coach Don Robbins and were members of the Big Sky Conference. They played their home games at new Idaho Stadium, an unlit outdoor facility on campus in Moscow, Idaho.

== Season ==
With quarterbacks Rick Seefried, Dave Comstock, and Ross Goddard running the offense, the Vandals were defending Big Sky champions. They were 4–7 overall and 2–3 in the Big Sky in 1972.

In the Battle of the Palouse, Idaho suffered a fifth straight loss to neighbor Washington State of the Pac-8, falling 35–14 at the new Martin Stadium in Pullman on October 7.

In their second game with new rival Boise State, the Vandals won 22–21 in the rain at Bronco Stadium on November 25 to even up the series;

Idaho did not schedule Northern Arizona until 1975 and played only five games in conference.

== University division ==
Through 1977, the Big Sky was a college division (renamed Division II in 1973) conference for football, except for university division (Division I) member Idaho, which moved down to the new Division I-AA in 1978. Idaho maintained its upper division status in the NCAA by playing university division non-conference opponents (and was ineligible for the college division postseason).

After the season in November, the Big Sky denied Idaho's request for additional football scholarships (75 vs. 62) for 1973.

== Schedule ==
Date	Time	Opponent	Site	Result	Attendance	Source
September 16	1:30 pm	Ohio*	Idaho Stadium; Moscow, ID	W 17–14	15,000	
September 23	6:30 pm	at Weber State	Wildcat Stadium; Ogden, UT	L 10–26	16,164	
September 30	12:30 pm	at Montana State	Van Winkle Stadium; Bozeman, MT	L 3–17	6,000	
October 7	1:30 pm	at Washington State*	Martin Stadium; Pullman, WA (rivalry)	L 14–35	18,500	
October 14	1:30 pm	Northern Illinois*	Idaho Stadium; Moscow, ID	W 31–13	7,000	
October 21	1:00 pm	at Idaho State	ASISU Minidome; Pocatello, ID (rivalry)	L 7–35	12,000	
October 28	1:30 pm	Pacific (CA)*^{†}	Idaho Stadium; Moscow, ID	L 7–22	11,500	
November 4	12:30 pm	at Utah State*	Romney Stadium; Logan, UT	L 7–51	8,575	
November 11	12:30 pm	Montana	Idaho Stadium; Moscow, ID (rivalry)	W 31–17	6,800	
November 18	10:30 am	at Western Michigan*	Waldo Stadium; Kalamazoo, MI	L 16–27	16,100	
November 25	12:30 pm	at Boise State	Bronco Stadium; Boise, ID (rivalry)	W 22–21	14,516	
*Non-conference game; ^{†}Homecoming; All times are in Pacific time

== Roster ==
1972 Idaho Vandals football team roster
Players
Coaches
Offense

Pos.	#	Name	Class
FL	10	Curt Hamm
QB	12	Ross Goddard	So
QB	14	Dave Comstock	Fr
QB	18	Rick Seefried	Jr
FL, P	20	Kirk Dennis	So
FL	21	Collie Mack	So
RB	23	Jerry Hall	Sr
FL	30	Jerry Williams	Jr
RB	34	Mike Autrey
RB	35	Bernie Rembert	Sr
RB	36	Rich Brown	So
RB	38	Dick Baranco
RB	45	Randy Ammerman
C	50	Ken Muhlbeier (C)	Sr
C	55	Steven Roe
G	56	Mark Busch	Sr
C	59	Daryl Hanauer	Sr
G	63	Jerry Anderson
G	67	Craig Pritchard	Jr
OT	69	Dave Hershey
OT	70	Jerry Sinclair	Jr
OT	72	Larry Bosma	Sr
OT	73	Pat Fee	Jr
G	74	Dave Crnich	Sr
G	76	Bob Van Duyne	Jr
OT	77	Larry Warren	Sr
SE	80	Jay Curcio	Sr
TE	82	Darrell Burchfield	Sr
SE	83	Kevin Ault	Sr
TE	85	Bill Kashetta	Jr
SE	89	Nick Nead

Defense

Pos.	#	Name	Class
DB	10	Syd Lofton	Fr
S	11	Bucky Bruns	Jr
S, P	16	Steve Hunter	Sr
CB	22	Darrell Streeter
S	24	Ross Nelson	So
S	25	Randy Hall	Jr
DB	26	Curt Parsons	Fr
S	27	Bruce Scharnhorst
S	31	Jim Welch	Jr
DB	33	Rod Maynard	Sr
CB	37	Stan Carter
DB	40	Larry Hultz
DB	42	Kelly Courage	Sr
DB	43	Chris Mooney
DL, OL	51	Mike Kramer	Fr
LB	52	Kevin Robison	Jr
LB	53	Rand Marquess (C)	Sr
LB	54	Fred Morscheck
LB	58	Ralph Sletager	Sr
DT	60	Ben Evenson
LB	61	Chuck Blanck	Jr
NG	62	Ron Moser
NG	65	Darrell Dodson
NG	66	Jim Riordon
DT	68	Lloyd Grimsrud	Jr
DT	71	Mike Newell	Sr
DT	75	Brian Jacobson
DT	78	Lorne Sherbina	Jr
DT	79	Kevin Wolske	Jr
DE	81	Ron Lockett
DE	84	Alofa Tauvage	Jr
DE	86	Tom Doud	Jr
DE	87	Alan Vance	Jr
DE	88	Joe Feehan

Special teams

Pos.	#	Name	Class
PK	7	Steve Tanner	So

Head coach

- Don Robbins (3rd year)

Coordinators/assistant coaches

- Bob Thompson (OC)
- Ray Fulton (DC)
- George Dyer
- Don Matthews (OL)
- Tom Roth
- Ed Troxel

Legend

- (C) Team captain
- (S) Suspended
- (I) Ineligible
- Injured
- Redshirt

== All-conference ==
The Vandal co-captains, center Ken Muhlbeier and linebacker Rand Marquess, were selected to the Big Sky all-conference team. Three Idaho players were named to the second team: running back Bernie Rembert, tight end Darrell Burchfeld, and defensive end Alofa Tauvage.

== NFL draft ==
One Vandal senior was selected in the 1973 NFL draft, which lasted 17 rounds (442 selections).

Player	Position	Round	Overall	Franchise
Ken Muhlbeier	C	16th	400	Denver Broncos

Two juniors were selected in the following year's draft in 1974, which lasted 17 rounds (442 selections).

Player	Position	Round	Overall	Franchise
Bob Van Duyne	G	10th	240	Baltimore Colts
Randy Hall	DB	13th	317	Baltimore Colts
