= 1972 Arizona State Sun Devils football team =

American college football season

1972 Arizona State Sun Devils football

WAC champion Fiesta Bowl champion

Fiesta Bowl, W 49–35 vs. Missouri
- Conference: Western Athletic Conference

Ranking
- Coaches: No. 13
- AP: No. 13
- Record: 10–2 (5–1 WAC)
- Head coach: Frank Kush (15th season)
- Defensive coordinator: Larry Kentera (2nd season)
- Captains: Larry Delbridge; Steve Matlock
- Home stadium: Sun Devil Stadium

1972 Western Athletic Conference football standings
	Conf.					Overall
Team	W		L		T	W		L		T
No. 13 Arizona State $	5	–	1	–	0	10	–	2	–	0
BYU	5	–	2	–	0	7	–	4	–	0
Utah	5	–	2	–	0	6	–	5	–	0
Arizona	4	–	3	–	0	4	–	7	–	0
Wyoming	3	–	4	–	0	4	–	7	–	0
New Mexico	2	–	4	–	0	3	–	8	–	0
Colorado State	1	–	4	–	0	1	–	10	–	0
UTEP	1	–	6	–	0	2	–	8	–	0
$ – Conference champion; Rankings from AP Poll

The 1972 Arizona State Sun Devils football team represented Arizona State University as a member of the Western Athletic Conference (WAC) during the 1972 NCAA University Division football season. Led by 15th-year head coach Frank Kush, the Sun Devils compiled an overall record of 10–2 with a mark of 5–1, winning the WAC title for the fourth consecutive season. Arizona State earned a berth in the Fiesta Bowl, where the Sun Devils defeated Missouri. The team played home games at Sun Devil Stadium in Tempe, Arizona.

== Schedule ==
Date	Time	Opponent	Rank	Site	Result	Attendance	Source
September 16		at Houston*	No. 13	Houston Astrodome; Houston, TX	W 33–28	24,628	
September 23		Kansas State*	No. 10	Sun Devil Stadium; Tempe, AZ	W 56–14	50,682	
September 30		at Wyoming	No. 11	War Memorial Stadium; Laramie, WY	L 43–45	19,298	
October 7		Oregon State*		Sun Devil Stadium; Tempe, AZ	W 38–7	50,879	
October 14		Utah		Sun Devil Stadium; Tempe, AZ	W 59–48	49,168	
October 21		at BYU	No. 19	Cougar Stadium; Provo, UT	W 49–17	23,561	
October 28	1:30 p.m.	Air Force*	No. 16	Sun Devil Stadium; Tempe, AZ	L 31–39	47,091	
November 4		at UTEP		Sun Bowl; El Paso, TX	W 55–14	7,414	
November 11		New Mexico^{†}	No. 19	Sun Devil Stadium; Tempe, AZ	W 60–7	44,172	
November 18	7:30 p.m.	San Jose State*	No. 18	Sun Devil Stadium; Tempe, AZ	W 51–21	43,912	
November 25		at Arizona	No. 18	Arizona Stadium; Tucson, AZ (rivalry)	W 38–21	38,500	
December 23		vs. Missouri*	No. 15	Sun Devil Stadium; Tempe, AZ (Fiesta Bowl)	W 49–35	51,318	
*Non-conference game; ^{†}Homecoming; Rankings from AP Poll released prior to the game; All times are in Mountain time

== Rankings ==
Ranking movements Legend: ██ Increase in ranking ██ Decrease in ranking — = Not ranked
	Week													
Poll	Pre	1	2	3	4	5	6	7	8	9	10	11	12	Final
AP	12	13	10	11	—	—	19	16	—	19	18	18	15	13

== Game summaries ==
=== Houston ===
Team	1	2	3	4	Total
• Arizona St	20	10	0	3	33
Houston	14	0	0	14	28

- Date: September 16
- Location: Robertson Stadium, Houston, Texas

Scoring summary
1	Arizona St	Holden 55-yard pass from White (Cruz kick)	Arizona St 7-0
1	Arizona St	Holden 52-yard pass from White (kick failed)	Arizona St 13-0
1	Arizona St	Green 9-yard run (Cruz kick)	Arizona St 20-0
1	Houston	Nobles 1-yard run (Terrell kick)	Arizona St 20-7
1	Houston	Evans 20-yard interception return (Terrell kick)	Arizona St 20-14
2	Arizona St	McClanahan 2-yard run (Cruz kick)	Arizona St 27-14
2	Arizona St	Cruz 44-yard field goal	Arizona St 30-14
4	Houston	Watts 17-yard pass from Nobles (Terrell kick)	Arizona St 30-21
4	Arizona St	Cruz 38-yard field goal	Arizona St 33-21
4	Houston	Johnson 46-yard pass from Nobles (Terrell kick)	Arizona St 33-28

== Personnel ==
=== Coaching staff ===
Head coach: Frank Kush

Assistants: Don Baker (offensive backfield), Larry Kentera (DE/LB), Jerry Thompson (DL), Al Luginbill (DB), Joe McDonald (WR), Al Tanara (OL), Bill Kajikawa (freshman)

=== Depth chart ===
==== Offense ====
POS	Name
QB	Danny White
HB	Woody Green
FB	Brent McClanahan
SE	Ed Beverly
WB	Steve Holden
TE	Joe Petty
LT	Steve Gunther
LG	John Houser
C	Ron Lou
RG	Steve Matlock
RT	Ed Kindig

==== Defense ====
POS	Name
LDE	Larry Shorty
LDT	Deke Ballard
MG	Tim Hoban
RDT	Neal Skarin
LLB	Bob Breunig
RLB	Larry Delbridge
LCB	Reedy Hall
RCB	Prentice McCray
WS	Wayne Bradley
SS	Ron Lumpkin
K	Juan Cruz

== 1972 team players in the NFL ==
The following players were claimed in the 1973 NFL draft.

Player	Position	Round	Pick	NFL club
Steve Holden	Wide receiver	1	16	Cleveland Browns
Brent McClanahan	Running back	5	118	Minnesota Vikings
Ed Beverly	Wide receiver	5	122	San Francisco 49ers
Prentice McCray	Defensive back	8	200	Detroit Lions
Ron Lou	Center	14	339	Houston Oilers
Ron Lumpkin	Defensive back	12	303	New York Giants
