= 1972 Montana Grizzlies football team =

American college football season

1972 Montana Grizzlies football
- Conference: Big Sky Conference
- Record: 3–8 (3–3 Big Sky)
- Head coach: Jack Swarthout (6th season)
- Captains: Mick Dennehy; Jim Hann
- Home stadium: Dornblaser Field

1972 Big Sky Conference football standings
	Conf.					Overall
Team	W		L		T	W		L		T
Montana State $	5	–	1	–	0	8	–	3	–	0
Idaho State	4	–	1	–	0	7	–	3	–	0
Boise State	3	–	3	–	0	7	–	4	–	0
Montana	3	–	3	–	0	3	–	8	–	0
Idaho	2	–	3	–	0	4	–	7	–	0
Weber State	2	–	4	–	0	5	–	5	–	0
Northern Arizona	0	–	4	–	0	3	–	8	–	0
$ – Conference champion

The 1972 Montana Grizzlies football team was an American football team that represented the University of Montana in the Big Sky Conference during the 1972 NCAA College Division football season. In their sixth year under head coach Jack Swarthout, the Grizzlies played their home games at Dornblaser Field and compiled a 3–8 record, (3–3 in Big Sky, third).

== Schedule ==
Date	Time	Opponent	Site	Result	Attendance	Source
September 9	12:30 pm	at South Dakota*	Inman Field; Vermillion, SD	L 0–35	6,000–9,000	
September 16	8:00 pm	vs. North Dakota*	Daylis Stadium; Billings, MT	L 14–42	6,000–7,000	
September 23	1:30 pm	Northern Arizona	Dornblaser Field; Missoula, MT	W 40–17	6,500	
September 30	8:30 pm	at Pacific (CA)*	Pacific Memorial Stadium; Stockton, CA	L 6–24	12,253	
October 7	1:30 pm	Weber State	Dornblaser Field; Missoula, MT	W 12–7	7,200	
October 14	7:30 pm	at Idaho State	ASISU Minidome; Pocatello, ID	L 7–14	11,000	
October 21	11:00 pm	at Hawaii*	Honolulu Stadium; Honolulu, HI	L 3–30	17,901	
October 28	1:30 pm	Boise State^{†}	Dornblaser Field; Missoula, MT	W 42–28	6,000	
November 4	1:30 pm	Montana State	Dornblaser Field; Missoula, MT (rivalry)	L 3–21	12,600	
November 11	1:30 pm	at Idaho	Idaho Stadium; Moscow, ID (Little Brown Stein)	L 17–31	6,800	
November 18	12:30 pm	at Tulsa*	Skelly Stadium; Tulsa, OK	L 7–10	3,000–10,000	
*Non-conference game; ^{†}Homecoming; All times are in Mountain time

== Coaching staff ==
- Bill Betcher (OL, DL)
- Charley Armey (OB, LB)
- Ron Nord (WR, DB)
