= 1972 Idaho State Bengals football team =

American college football season

1972 Idaho State Bengals football
- Conference: Big Sky Conference
- Record: 7–3 (4–2 Big Sky)
- Head coach: Bob Griffin (1st season)
- Home stadium: ASISU Minidome

1972 Big Sky Conference football standings
	Conf.					Overall
Team	W		L		T	W		L		T
Montana State $	5	–	1	–	0	8	–	3	–	0
Idaho State	4	–	1	–	0	7	–	3	–	0
Boise State	3	–	3	–	0	7	–	4	–	0
Montana	3	–	3	–	0	3	–	8	–	0
Idaho	2	–	3	–	0	4	–	7	–	0
Weber State	2	–	4	–	0	5	–	5	–	0
Northern Arizona	0	–	4	–	0	3	–	8	–	0
$ – Conference champion

The 1972 Idaho State Bengals football team represented Idaho State University as a member of the Big Sky Conference during the 1972 NCAA College Division football season. Led by first-year head coach Bob Griffin, the Bengals compiled an overall record of 7–3, with a mark of 4–2 in conference play, and finished second in the Big Sky.

== Schedule ==
Date	Time	Opponent	Rank	Site	Result	Attendance	Source
September 9		at Wyoming*		War Memorial Stadium; Laramie, WY	L 14–30	20,107	
September 16		South Dakota*		ASISU Minidome; Pocatello, ID	L 7–35	9,000	
September 30		Portland State*		ASISU Minidome; Pocatello, ID	W 51–6	7,500	
October 7		at Eastern Michigan*		Rynearson Stadium; Ypsilanti, MI	W 21–14	9,400	
October 14		Montana		ASISU Minidome; Pocatello, ID	W 14–7	11,000	
October 21		Idaho		ASISU Minidome; Pocatello, ID (rivalry)	W 35–7	12,000	
October 8		at Montana State		Van Winkle Stadium; Bozeman, MT	W 20–16	5,200	
November 4		at Weber State		Wildcat Stadium; Ogden, UT	W 49–7	6,716	
November 11		at Boise State	No. 9	Bronco Stadium; Boise, ID	L 28–31	14,017	
November 18	7:30 p.m.	Drake*		ASISU Minidome; Pocatello, ID	W 24–21	9,200	
*Non-conference game; Rankings from AP Poll released prior to the game; All times are in Mountain time
