= 1972 Weber State Wildcats football team =

American college football season

1972 Weber State Wildcats football
- Conference: Big Sky Conference
- Record: 5–5 (2–4 Big Sky)
- Head coach: Sark Arslanian (8th season)
- Home stadium: Wildcat Stadium

1972 Big Sky Conference football standings
	Conf.					Overall
Team	W		L		T	W		L		T
Montana State $	5	–	1	–	0	8	–	3	–	0
Idaho State	4	–	1	–	0	7	–	3	–	0
Boise State	3	–	3	–	0	7	–	4	–	0
Montana	3	–	3	–	0	3	–	8	–	0
Idaho	2	–	3	–	0	4	–	7	–	0
Weber State	2	–	4	–	0	5	–	5	–	0
Northern Arizona	0	–	4	–	0	3	–	8	–	0
$ – Conference champion

The 1972 Weber State Wildcats football team represented Weber State College (now known as Weber State University) as a member of the Big Sky Conference during the 1972 NCAA College Division football season. Led by eighth-year head coach Sark Arslanian, the Wildcats compiled an overall record of 5–5, with a mark of 2–4 in conference play, and finished sixth in the Big Sky.

== Schedule ==
Date	Opponent	Site	Result	Attendance	Source
September 23	Idaho	Wildcat Stadium; Ogden, UT	W 26–10	16,134	
September 30	at No. 5 Boise State	Bronco Stadium; Boise, ID	L 16–49	14,776	
October 7	at Montana	Dornblaser Field; Missoula, MT	L 7–12	7,200	
October 14	Montana State	Wildcat Stadium; Ogden, UT	L 3–9	9,036	
October 21	at Northern Arizona	Lumberjack Stadium; Flagstaff, AZ	W 28–7	2,690	
October 28	UNLV*	Wildcat Stadium; Ogden, UT	W 30–0	6,723	
November 4	Idaho State	Wildcat Stadium; Ogden, UT	L 7–49	6,716	
November 11	Northern Michigan*	Wildcat Stadium; Ogden, UT	W 30–18	2,727	
November 18	at New Mexico Highlands*	Perkins Stadium; Las Vegas, NM	W 1–0	N/A (forfeit win)	
November 23	at Utah State*	Romney Stadium; Logan, UT	L 16–20	8,115	
*Non-conference game; Rankings from AP Poll released prior to the game
