= 1972 Cal State Fullerton Titans football team =

American college football season

1972 Cal State Fullerton Titans football
- Conference: California Collegiate Athletic Association
- Record: 7–4 (2–2 CCAA)
- Head coach: Pete Yoder (1st season)
- Home stadium: Santa Ana Stadium

1972 California Collegiate Athletic Association football standings
	Conf.					Overall
Team	W		L		T	W		L		T
No. 3/3 Cal Poly +	3	–	0	–	0	8	–	1	–	1
UC Riverside +	3	–	0	–	0	9	–	1	–	0
Cal State Fullerton	2	–	2	–	0	7	–	4	–	0
Cal State Northridge	1	–	3	–	0	6	–	5	–	0
Cal Poly Pomona	0	–	4	–	0	4	–	6	–	0
+ – Conference co-champions; Rankings from AP/UPI small college polls

The 1972 Cal State Fullerton Titans football team represented California State University, Fullerton as a member of the California Collegiate Athletic Association (CCAA) during the 1972 NCAA College Division football season. Led by first-year head coach Pete Yoder, Cal State Fullerton compiled an overall record of 7–4 with a mark of 2–2 in conference play, placing second in the CCAA. The Titans played home games at Santa Ana Stadium in Santa Ana, California.

== Schedule ==
Date	Time	Opponent	Site	Result	Attendance	Source
September 16		Nevada*	Santa Ana Stadium; Santa Ana, CA	W 13–6	2,515–4,200	
September 23		Cal State Hayward*	Santa Ana Stadium; Santa Ana, CA	W 35–25	1,751–2,600	
September 30	7:30 p.m.	at Long Beach State*	Veterans Stadium; Long Beach, CA	L 14–27	5,034–10,050	
October 7		at Cal State Northridge	Devonshire Downs; Northridge, CA	W 41–39	2,000–4,500	
October 14		at Hawaii*	Honolulu Stadium; Honolulu, HI	L 15–49	16,000–16,200	
October 21		at UNLV*	Las Vegas Stadium; Whitney, NV	W 30–20	5,980–11,000	
October 28		Cal Poly Pomona	Santa Ana Stadium; Santa Ana, CA	W 27–13	1,500–3,000	
November 4		at UC Riverside	Highlander Stadium; Riverside, CA	L 18–24	2,250	
November 11		No. 3 Cal Poly	Santa Ana Stadium; Santa Ana, CA	L 3–27	2,600–2,900	
November 18		Sacramento State*	Santa Ana Stadium; Santa Ana, CA	W 21–0	1,950–2,600	
November 24		Cal State Los Angeles*	Santa Ana Stadium; Santa Ana, CA	W 30–14	2,444–3,200	
*Non-conference game; Rankings from UPI Poll released prior to the game; All times are in Pacific time
