= Jack Wallace (American football) =

American football player and coach (1925–1995)

Biographical details
- Born: December 11, 1925; Grants, New Mexico, U.S.
- Died: February 24, 1995 (aged 69) near Corpus Christi, Texas, U.S.

Playing career
- 1946–1948: Pittsburg State

Coaching career (HC unless noted)
- 1956–1959: Dodge City
- 1960–1964: Drake (assistant)
- 1965–1976: Drake

Head coaching record
- Overall: 60–65–3 (college); 27–9–3 (junior college)
- Bowls: 0–2 (college)

Accomplishments and honors

Championships
- 2 KJJCC (1957–1958); 1 MVC (1972)

Awards
- MVC Coach of the Year (1972)

Jack D. Wallace (December 11, 1925 – February 24, 1995) was an American football player and coach. He served as the head football coach at Drake University from 1965 until 1976, compiling a record of 60–65–3.

Wallace was a native of Grants, New Mexico, and played college football at Pittsburg State University from 1946 to 1948. He earned a master's degree from Drake and a Ph.D. at the University of Iowa. Wallace died on February 23, 1995, in an automobile accident near Corpus Christi, Texas.

== Head coaching record ==
=== College ===
Year	Team	Overall	Conference	Standing	Bowl/playoffs
Drake Bulldogs (NCAA College Division independent) (1965–1970)
1965	Drake	6–4			
1966	Drake	8–2			
1967	Drake	4–5			
1968	Drake	5–5			
1969	Drake	7–2–2			L Pecan
1970	Drake	7–4			
Drake Bulldogs (Missouri Valley Conference) (1971–1976)
1971	Drake	7–4	2–3	5th	
1972	Drake	7–5	4–1	T–1st	L Pioneer
1973	Drake	2–9	1–5	T–6th	
1974	Drake	3–7–1	2–3–1	4th	
1975	Drake	3–8	1–3	T–4th	
1976	Drake	1–10	1–3	5th	
Drake:		60–65–3	11–18–1		
Total:		60–65–3			
National championship Conference title Conference division title or championship game berth

=== Junior college ===
Year	Team	Overall	Conference	Standing	Bowl/playoffs
Dodge City Conquistadors (Kansas Jayhawk Junior College Conference) (1956–1959)
1956	Dodge City		5–3	3rd	
1957	Dodge City	8–1	8–0	1st	
1958	Dodge City		7–0–1	1st	
1959	Dodge City		4–2–2	5th	
Dodge City:		27–9–3	24–5–3		
Total:		27–9–3			
National championship Conference title Conference division title or championship game berth
