= 1972 Boise State Broncos football team =

American college football season

1972 Boise State Broncos football
- Conference: Big Sky Conference
- Record: 7–4 (3–3 Big Sky)
- Head coach: Tony Knap (5th season)
- Home stadium: Bronco Stadium

1972 Big Sky Conference football standings
	Conf.					Overall
Team	W		L		T	W		L		T
Montana State $	5	–	1	–	0	8	–	3	–	0
Idaho State	4	–	1	–	0	7	–	3	–	0
Boise State	3	–	3	–	0	7	–	4	–	0
Montana	3	–	3	–	0	3	–	8	–	0
Idaho	2	–	3	–	0	4	–	7	–	0
Weber State	2	–	4	–	0	5	–	5	–	0
Northern Arizona	0	–	4	–	0	3	–	8	–	0
$ – Conference champion

The 1972 Boise State Broncos football team represented Boise State College during the 1972 NCAA College Division football season, the fifth season of Bronco football (at the four-year level) and the third as members of the Big Sky Conference and NCAA. In the College Division, they played their home games on campus at Bronco Stadium in Boise, Idaho.

Led by fifth-year head coach Tony Knap, the Broncos were 7–4 in the regular season and 3–3 in conference. The conference losses were the last until 1976.

== Schedule ==
Date	Time	Opponent	Rank	Site	Result	Attendance	Source
September 16	7:30 pm	UNLV*		Bronco Stadium; Boise, ID	W 36–16	13,418	
September 23	2:30 pm	at Humboldt State*	No. 7	Redwood Bowl; Arcata, CA	W 21–15		
September 30	7:30 pm	Weber State	No. 5	Bronco Stadium; Boise, ID	W 49–16	14,776	
October 7	7:30 pm	at Cal Poly*	No. 6	Mustang Stadium; San Luis Obispo, CA	L 21–26	7,200	
October 14	7:30 pm	Nevada*	No. 8	Bronco Stadium; Boise, ID (rivalry)	W 56–19	10,336	
October 21	2:00 pm	at Montana State	No. 7	Van Winkle Stadium; Bozeman, MT	L 10–37	7,200	
October 28	1:30 pm	at Montana		Dornblaser Field; Missoula, MT	L 28–42	6,000	
November 4	2:30 pm	at Portland State*		Civic Stadium; Portland, OR	W 33–7	1,769	
November 11	1:30 pm	No. 9 Idaho State^{†}		Bronco Stadium; Boise, ID	W 31–28	14,017	
November 18	1:30 pm	at Northern Arizona		Lumberjack Stadium; Flagstaff, AZ	W 39–12	2,200	
November 25	1:30 pm	Idaho		Bronco Stadium; Boise, ID (rivalry)	L 21–22	14,516	
*Non-conference game; ^{†}Homecoming; Rankings from AP Poll released prior to the game; All times are in Mountain time

== NFL draft ==
One Bronco was selected in the 1973 NFL draft, which lasted 17 rounds (442 selections).

Player	Position	Round	Overall	Franchise
Al Marshall	Wide receiver	10th	244	Denver Broncos
