= Rod Humenuik =

American gridiron football player and coach (1938–2022)

Biographical details
- Born: June 17, 1938; Detroit, Michigan, U.S.
- Died: January 24, 2022 (aged 83); Scottsdale, Arizona, U.S.

Playing career
- 1955: Pierce
- 1956–1957: USC
- 1960–1962: Winnipeg Blue Bombers
- Position: Tackle

Coaching career (HC unless noted)
- 1963: La Habra HS (CA) (line)
- 1964: Long Beach Poly HS (CA) (line)
- 1965: Fullerton (line)
- 1966–1970: USC (OL)
- 1971–1972: Valley State / Cal State Northridge
- 1973–1974: Toronto Argonauts (assistant)
- 1975–1982: Cleveland Browns (OL)
- 1983–1984: Kansas City Chiefs (OL)
- 1985–1988: New England Patriots (AHC)
- 1989: New York Jets (OL)
- 1990–1992: New England Patriots (OL)
- 1994: Kansas State (OL)
- 1997: Frankfurt Galaxy (OL)
- 1998: England Monarchs (OC/OL)
- 1998–2002: Principia
- 2001–2002: Detroit Fury (OL/DL)

Head coaching record
- Overall: 23–36

John R. "Rod" Humenuik (June 17, 1938 – January 24, 2022) was an American gridiron football player and coach. He served as the head football coach at California State University, Northridge from 1971 to 1972 and Principia College in Elsah, Illinois from 1998 to 2002, compiling a career college football record of 10–12.

Humenuik attended Los Angeles High School in Los Angeles, where was named an All-City tackle in 1954. He began his college football career at Pierce College in Los Angeles as a Guard at 16, earning All-Western State Conference laurels and honorable mention on All-American Junior College team in 1955. Humenuik transferred to the University of Southern California, earning letters for the USC Trojans football team in 1956 and 1957. The then played professionally as an Offensive Guard with the Winnipeg Blue Bombers in the Canadian Football League (CFL).

Humenuik began his coaching career in 1963 when he was hired as line coach at La Habra High School in La Habra, California. He served in the same role at Long Beach Polytechnic High School in Long Beach, California the following year before moving to Fullerton College in 1965, once again serving as line coach. Humenuik returned to USC in 1966 as an assistant coach under John McKay.

== Head coaching record ==
Year	Team	Overall	Conference	Standing	Bowl/playoffs
Valley State / Cal State Northridge Matadors (California Collegiate Athletic Association) (1971–1972)
1971	Valley State	4–7	1–2	3rd	
1972	Cal State Northridge	6–5	1–3	4th	
Valley State / Cal State Northridge:		10–12	2–5		
Principia Panthers (St. Louis Intercollegiate Athletic Conference) (1998–1999)
1998	Principia	0–8	0–4		
1999	Principia	2–4			
Principia Panthers (NCAA Division III independent) (2000–2002)
2000	Principia	4–4			
2001	Principia	2–4			
2002	Principia	5–4			
Principia:		13–24			
Total:		23–36			
