= 1972 Cal Poly Mustangs football team =

American college football season

1972 Cal Poly Mustangs football

CCAA co-champion

Camellia Bowl, L 21–38 vs. North Dakota
- Conference: California Collegiate Athletic Association

Ranking
- Coaches: No. 3 (UPI small college)
- AP: No. 3 (small college)
- Record: 8–1–1 (3–0 CCAA)
- Head coach: Joe Harper (5th season)
- Home stadium: Mustang Stadium

1972 California Collegiate Athletic Association football standings
	Conf.					Overall
Team	W		L		T	W		L		T
No. 3/3 Cal Poly +	3	–	0	–	0	8	–	1	–	1
UC Riverside +	3	–	0	–	0	9	–	1	–	0
Cal State Fullerton	2	–	2	–	0	7	–	4	–	0
Cal State Northridge	1	–	3	–	0	6	–	5	–	0
Cal Poly Pomona	0	–	4	–	0	4	–	6	–	0
+ – Conference co-champions; Rankings from AP/UPI small college polls

The 1972 Cal Poly Mustangs football team represented California Polytechnic State University, San Luis Obispo as a member of the California Collegiate Athletic Association (CCAA) during the 1972 NCAA College Division football season. Led by fifth-year head coach Joe Harper, Cal Poly compiled an overall record of 8–1–1 with a mark of 3–0 in conference play, sharing the CCAA title with UC Riverside and winning a conference championship for the fourth consecutive season. Cal Poly was invited to the NCAA College Division western region playoff game, the Camellia Bowl, held in Sacramento, California. The Mustangs played North Dakota on December 10, losing 38–21. Cal Poly was ranked No. 3 in the final small college rankings. The Mustangs played home games at Mustang Stadium in San Luis Obispo, California.

== Schedule ==
Date	Opponent	Rank	Site	Result	Attendance	Source
September 16	Cal State Hayward*		Mustang Stadium; San Luis Obispo, CA	W 42–0	2,753	
September 23	Montana State*		Mustang Stadium; San Luis Obispo, CA	W 34–7	6,200	
September 30	Humboldt State*	No. 19	Mustang Stadium; San Luis Obispo, CA	W 34–0	6,200	
October 7	No. 6 Boise State*	No. 12	Mustang Stadium; San Luis Obispo, CA	W 26–21	7,200	
October 14	at No. 10 Fresno State*	No. 4	Ratcliffe Stadium; Fresno, CA	T 24–24	13,334–14,300	
October 21	Cal State Northridge	No. 6	Mustang Stadium; San Luis Obispo, CA	W 11–10	6,500–6,800	
October 28	at Nevada*	No. 3	Mackay Stadium; Reno, NV	W 14–12	3,500–4,200	
November 11	at Cal State Fullerton	No. 3	Santa Ana Stadium; Santa Ana, CA	W 27–3	2,600–2,900	
November 18	at Cal Poly Pomona	No. 3	Kellogg Field; Pomona, CA	W 21–16	3,200–3,500	
December 10	No. 4 North Dakota*	No. 3	Hornet Stadium; Sacramento, CA (Camellia Bowl)	L 21–38		
*Non-conference game; Rankings from UPI Poll released prior to the game
