= 1972 Cal State Northridge Matadors football team =

American college football season

1972 Cal State Northridge Matadors football
- Conference: California Collegiate Athletic Association
- Record: 6–5 (1–3 CCAA)
- Head coach: Rod Humenuik (2nd season)
- Home stadium: North Campus Stadium

1972 California Collegiate Athletic Association football standings
	Conf.					Overall
Team	W		L		T	W		L		T
No. 3/3 Cal Poly +	3	–	0	–	0	8	–	1	–	1
UC Riverside +	3	–	0	–	0	9	–	1	–	0
Cal State Fullerton	2	–	2	–	0	7	–	4	–	0
Cal State Northridge	1	–	3	–	0	6	–	5	–	0
Cal Poly Pomona	0	–	4	–	0	4	–	6	–	0
+ – Conference co-champions; Rankings from AP/UPI small college polls

The 1972 Cal State Northridge Matadors football team represented California State University, Northridge as a member of the California Collegiate Athletic Association (CCAA) during the 1972 NCAA College Division football season. Led by Rod Humenuik in his second and final season as head coach, Cal State Northridge compiled an overall record of 6–5 with a mark of 1–3 in conference play, placing fourth in the CCAA. The team outscored its opponents 375 to 192 for the season and allowed under ten points four times. The Matadors played home games at North Campus Stadium in Northridge, California.

== Schedule ==
Date	Time	Opponent	Site	Result	Attendance	Source
September 16		Oregon Tech*	North Campus Stadium; Northridge, CA	W 46–14	2,500	
September 23		at San Francisco State*	Cox Stadium; San Francisco, CA	W 23–0	1,500	
September 30		at Cal State Hayward*	Pioneer Stadium; Hayward, CA	W 45–0	2,000–2,003	
October 7		Cal State Fullerton	North Campus Stadium; Northridge, CA	L 39–41	2,000–4,500	
October 21		at No. 6 Cal Poly	Mustang Stadium; San Luis Obispo, CA	L 10–11	6,500–6,800	
October 28		Northern Arizona*	North Campus Stadium; Northridge, CA	L 14–15	4,000	
November 4		at Cal Poly Pomona	Kellogg Field; Pomona, CA	W 56–35	2,000–2,542	
November 11		at UC Riverside	Highlander Stadium; Riverside, CA	L 26–27	2,000–3,300	
November 18		Cal State Los Angeles*	North Campus Stadium; Northridge, CA	W 35–7	2,500	
November 25		Cal Lutheran*	North Campus Stadium; Northridge, CA	W 49–7	4,500	
December 2	1:00 p.m.	Long Beach State*	North Campus Stadium; Northridge, CA	L 32–35	1,500–4,700	
*Non-conference game; Rankings from UPI Poll released prior to the game; All times are in Pacific time

== Team players in the NFL ==
The following Cal State Northridge players were selected in the 1973 NFL draft.

Player	Position	Round	Overall	NFL team
Doug Jones	DB	6	145	Kansas City Chiefs
