= 1972 Long Beach State 49ers football team =

American college football season

1972 Long Beach State 49ers football
- Conference: Pacific Coast Athletic Association
- Record: 5–6 (1–3 PCAA)
- Head coach: Jim Stangeland (4th season)
- Home stadium: Veterans Stadium; Anaheim Stadium

1972 Pacific Coast Athletic Association football standings
	Conf.					Overall
Team	W		L		T	W		L		T
San Diego State $	4	–	0	–	0	10	–	1	–	0
Pacific (CA)	3	–	1	–	0	8	–	3	–	0
Fresno State	1	–	3	–	0	6	–	4	–	1
Long Beach State	1	–	3	–	0	5	–	6	–	0
San Jose State	1	–	3	–	0	4	–	7	–	0
Cal State Los Angeles*	0	–	0	–	0	3	–	7	–	0
$ – Conference champion; * – Did not compete for conference title

The 1972 Long Beach State 49ers football team represented California State University, Long Beach (Note: The official name of Long Beach State has been California State University, Long Beach since 1972. However, it is still commonly known as Long Beach State.) during the 1972 NCAA University Division football season.

Cal State Long Beach competed in the Pacific Coast Athletic Association. (Note: The Big West Conference was known as the Pacific Coast Athletic Association from its founding in 1969 through 1987.) The team was led by fourth year head coach Jim Stangeland, and played the majority of their home games at Anaheim Stadium in Anaheim, California. One home game was played at Veterans Stadium adjacent to the campus of Long Beach City College in Long Beach, California, and another at Falcon Stadium at Cerritos College in Norwalk, California. They finished the season with a record of five wins and six losses (5–6, 1–3 PCAA).

== Schedule ==
Date	Time	Opponent	Site	Result	Attendance	Source
September 9	10:30 a.m.	at Western Michigan*	Waldo Stadium; Kalamazoo, MI	L 20–28	18,150	
September 16	7:30 p.m.	North Texas State*	Falcon Stadium; Norwalk, CA	W 24–21	4,972	
September 22	8:30 p.m.	Grambling*	Los Angeles Memorial Coliseum; Los Angeles CA	W 25–19	42,058	
September 30	7:30 p.m.	Cal State Fullerton*	Veterans Memorial Stadium; Long Beach, CA	W 27–14	5,034–10,050	
October 7	1:00 p.m.	BYU*	Anaheim Stadium; Anaheim, CA	L 27–38	11,529	
October 14	7:30 p.m.	at Pacific (CA)	Pacific Memorial Stadium; Stockton, CA	L 10–14	12,013	
October 28	7:30 p.m.	at San Jose State	Spartan Stadium; San Jose, CA	L 8–35	14,700	
November 4	7:30 p.m.	at Fresno State	Ratcliffe Stadium; Fresno, CA	W 21–16	11,000	
November 17	8:00 p.m.	Northern Illinois*	Anaheim Stadium; Anaheim, CA	L 13–22	2,552–4,000	
November 25	7:30 p.m.	San Diego State	Anaheim Stadium; Anaheim, CA	L 14–33	17,644	
December 2	1:00 p.m.	at Cal State Northridge*	Devonshire Downs; Northridge, CA	W 35–32	1,500–4,700	
*Non-conference game; All times are in Pacific time

== NFL draft ==
One 49er player was selected in the 1973 NFL draft.

Player	Position	Round	Overall	Franchise
Terry Metcalf	Running back, Wide receiver	3	63	St. Louis Cardinals
