= 1972 Northern Arizona Lumberjacks football team =

American college football season

1972 Northern Arizona Lumberjacks football
- Conference: Big Sky Conference
- Record: 3–8 (0–4 Big Sky)
- Head coach: Ed Peasley (2nd season)
- Home stadium: Lumberjack Stadium

1972 Big Sky Conference football standings
	Conf.					Overall
Team	W		L		T	W		L		T
Montana State $	5	–	1	–	0	8	–	3	–	0
Idaho State	4	–	1	–	0	7	–	3	–	0
Boise State	3	–	3	–	0	7	–	4	–	0
Montana	3	–	3	–	0	3	–	8	–	0
Idaho	2	–	3	–	0	4	–	7	–	0
Weber State	2	–	4	–	0	5	–	5	–	0
Northern Arizona	0	–	4	–	0	3	–	8	–	0
$ – Conference champion

The 1972 Northern Arizona Lumberjacks football team represented Northern Arizona University as a member of the Big Sky Conference during the 1972 NCAA College Division football season. Led by second-year head coach Ed Peasley, the Lumberjacks compiled an overall record of 3–8, with a mark of 0–4 in conference play, and finished seventh in the Big Sky.

== Schedule ==
Date	Opponent	Site	Result	Attendance	Source
September 9	North Dakota State*	Lumberjack Stadium; Flagstaff, AZ	L 7–14	7,963	
September 16	San Francisco State*	Lumberjack Stadium; Flagstaff, AZ	W 31–10	6,826	
September 23	at Montana	Dornblaser Field; Missoula, MT	L 17–40	6,500	
September 30	at New Mexico Highlands*	Perkins Stadium; Las Vegas, NM	W 35–26	3,500	
October 7	at Montana State	Van Winkle Stadium; Bozeman, MT	L 9–23	6,500	
October 14	Trinity (TX)*	Lumberjack Stadium; Flagstaff, AZ	L 22–37	7,870	
October 21	Weber State	Lumberjack Stadium; Flagstaff, AZ	L 7–28	2,690	
October 28	at Cal State Northridge*	North Campus Stadium; Northridge, CA	W 15–14	4,000	
November 4	No. 2 Louisiana Tech*	Lumberjack Stadium; Flagstaff, AZ	L 21–41	7,750	
November 11	at Hawaii*	Honolulu Stadium; Honolulu, HI	L 13–20	13,100	
November 18	Boise State	Lumberjack Stadium; Flagstaff, AZ	L 12–39	2,200	
*Non-conference game; Rankings from AP Poll released prior to the game
