= 1972 Pacific Tigers football team =

American college football season

1972 Pacific Tigers football
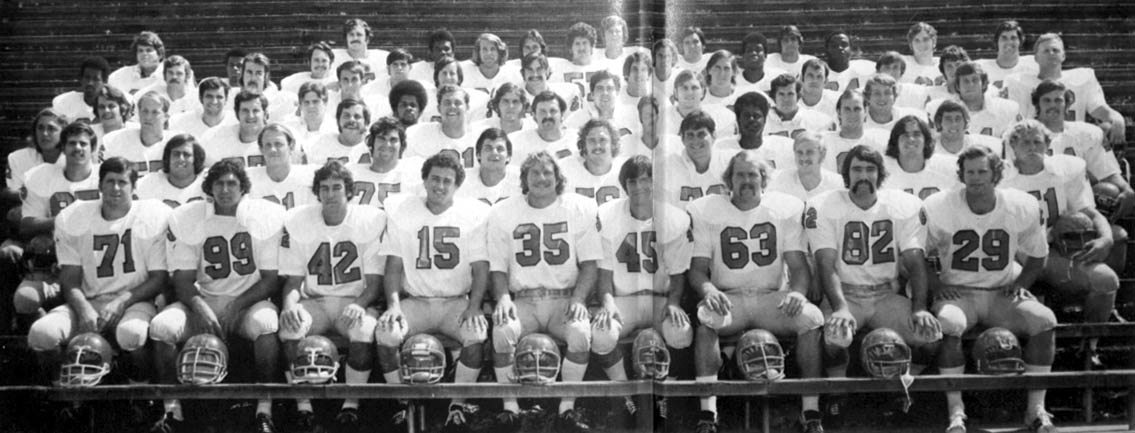
- Conference: Pacific Coast Athletic Association
- Record: 8–3 (3–1 PCAA)
- Head coach: Chester Caddas (1st season)
- Home stadium: Pacific Memorial Stadium

1972 Pacific Coast Athletic Association football standings
	Conf.					Overall
Team	W		L		T	W		L		T
San Diego State $	4	–	0	–	0	10	–	1	–	0
Pacific (CA)	3	–	1	–	0	8	–	3	–	0
Fresno State	1	–	3	–	0	6	–	4	–	1
Long Beach State	1	–	3	–	0	5	–	6	–	0
San Jose State	1	–	3	–	0	4	–	7	–	0
Cal State Los Angeles*	0	–	0	–	0	3	–	7	–	0
$ – Conference champion; * – Did not compete for conference title

The 1972 Pacific Tigers football team represented the University of the Pacific (UOP) as a member of the Pacific Coast Athletic Association (PCAA) during the 1972 NCAA University Division football season. Led by first-year head coach Chester Caddas, the Tigers compiled an overall record of 8–3 with a mark of 3–1 in conference play, placing second in the PCAA, and outscored opponents 232 to 176. The team played home games at Pacific Memorial Stadium in Stockton, California.

== Schedule ==
Date	Time	Opponent	Site	Result	Attendance	Source
September 9		at No. 9 Washington*	Husky Stadium; Seattle, WA	L 6–13	57,500	
September 16	5:30 p.m.	at No. 9 LSU*	Tiger Stadium; Baton Rouge, LA	L 13–31	66,574	
September 23	6:30 p.m.	at UTEP*	Sun Bowl; El Paso, TX	W 19–14	9,250–9,275	
September 30	7:30 p.m.	Montana*	Pacific Memorial Stadium; Stockton, CA	W 24–6	12,253	
October 7	7:30 p.m.	at Fresno State	Ratcliffe Stadium; Fresno, CA	W 17–0	14,071	
October 14	7:30 p.m.	Long Beach State	Pacific Memorial Stadium; Stockton, CA	W 14–10	12,013	
October 21	2:00 p.m.	San Jose State^{†}	Pacific Memorial Stadium; Stockton, CA (Victory Bell)	W 38–28	15,623–15,625	
October 28	1:30 p.m.	at Idaho*	Idaho Stadium; Moscow, ID	W 22–7	11,500	
November 4	1:30 p.m.	Cal State Los Angeles*	Pacific Memorial Stadium; Stockton, CA	W 36–21	5,218–5,785	
November 11	7:30 p.m.	at San Diego State	San Diego Stadium; San Diego, CA	L 7–20	25,000–25,838	
November 18	1:30 p.m.	UC Davis*	Pacific Memorial Stadium; Stockton, CA	W 36–26	8,261–8,350	
*Non-conference game; ^{†}Homecoming; Rankings from AP Poll released prior to the game
