= 1972 UTEP Miners football team =

American college football season

1972 UTEP Miners football
- Conference: Western Athletic Conference
- Record: 2–8 (1–6 WAC)
- Head coach: Bobby Dobbs (8th season; first 6 games); Tommy Hudspeth (interim, final 4 games)
- Home stadium: Sun Bowl

1972 Western Athletic Conference football standings
	Conf.					Overall
Team	W		L		T	W		L		T
No. 13 Arizona State $	5	–	1	–	0	10	–	2	–	0
BYU	5	–	2	–	0	7	–	4	–	0
Utah	5	–	2	–	0	6	–	5	–	0
Arizona	4	–	3	–	0	4	–	7	–	0
Wyoming	3	–	4	–	0	4	–	7	–	0
New Mexico	2	–	4	–	0	3	–	8	–	0
Colorado State	1	–	4	–	0	1	–	10	–	0
UTEP	1	–	6	–	0	2	–	8	–	0
$ – Conference champion; Rankings from AP Poll

The 1972 UTEP Miners football team was an American football team that represented the University of Texas at El Paso in the Western Athletic Conference during the 1972 NCAA University Division football season. After a 1–5 start to the season, eighth-year head coach Bobby Dobbs resigned and was replaced with offensive coordinator Tommy Hudspeth. The Miners then ended the season with one win and three more losses and finished with a 2–8 record.

== Schedule ==
Date	Time	Opponent	Site	Result	Attendance	Source
September 16		Lamar*	Sun Bowl; El Paso, TX	L 28–42	10,573	
September 23	7:30 p.m.	Pacific (CA)*	Sun Bowl; El Paso, TX	L 14–19	9,250–9,275	
September 30		New Mexico State*	Sun Bowl; El Paso, TX (rivalry)	W 21–20	11,300	
October 7		at Utah	Robert Rice Stadium; Salt Lake City, UT	L 20–39	20,860	
October 14		at BYU	Cougar Stadium; Provo, UT	L 14–21	31,176	
October 21		New Mexico^{†}	Sun Bowl; El Paso, TX	L 7–56	10,250	
October 28		at Arizona	Arizona Stadium; Tucson, AZ	L 22–45	28,000	
November 4		Arizona State	Sun Bowl; El Paso, TX	L 14–55	7,414	
November 11		Wyoming	Sun Bowl; El Paso, TX	W 20–13	4,600	
November 18		at Colorado State	Hughes Stadium; Fort Collins, CO	L 22–35	14,235	
*Non-conference game; ^{†}Homecoming; All times are in Mountain time
