= 1972 UC Riverside Highlanders football team =

American college football season

1972 UC Riverside Highlanders football

CCAA co-champion
- Conference: California Collegiate Athletic Association
- Record: 9–1 (3–0 CCAA)
- Head coach: Wayne Howard (1st season)
- Offensive coordinator: Ron McBride (1st season)
- Defensive coordinator: Tom Gadd (1st season)
- Home stadium: Highlander Stadium

1972 California Collegiate Athletic Association football standings
	Conf.					Overall
Team	W		L		T	W		L		T
No. 3/3 Cal Poly +	3	–	0	–	0	8	–	1	–	1
UC Riverside +	3	–	0	–	0	9	–	1	–	0
Cal State Fullerton	2	–	2	–	0	7	–	4	–	0
Cal State Northridge	1	–	3	–	0	6	–	5	–	0
Cal Poly Pomona	0	–	4	–	0	4	–	6	–	0
+ – Conference co-champions; Rankings from AP/UPI small college polls

The 1972 UC Riverside Highlanders football team represented the University of California, Riverside as a member of the California Collegiate Athletic Association (CCAA) during the 1972 NCAA College Division football season. Led by first-year head coach Wayne Howard, UC Riverside compiled an overall record of 9–1 with a mark of record of 3–0 in conference play, sharing the CCAA title with Cal Poly. The team outscored its opponents 207 to 113 for the season. The Highlanders played home games at Highlander Stadium in Riverside, California.

== Schedule ==
Date	Opponent	Site	Result	Attendance	Source
September 16	San Diego*	Highlander Stadium; Riverside, CA	W 34–14	2,100	
September 23	UC Davis*	Highlander Stadium; Riverside, CA	L 10–17	1,500	
September 30	at UNLV*	Las Vegas Stadium; Whitney, NV	W 14–7	6,180	
October 7	Simon Fraser*	Highlander Stadium; Riverside, CA	W 27–7	2,000	
October 14	at Redlands*	Redlands Stadium; Redlands, CA	W 17–0	4,000	
October 21	at Cal Poly Pomona	Kellogg Field; Pomona, CA	W 10–7	3,400	
October 28	at Whittier*	Memorial Stadium; Whittier, CA	W 15–14		
November 4	Cal State Fullerton	Highlander Stadium; Riverside, CA	W 24–18	2,600	
November 11	Cal State Northridge	Highlander Stadium; Riverside, CA	W 27–26	2,000–3,300	
November 18	at United States International*	Balboa Stadium; San Diego, CA	W 29–3	2,500	
*Non-conference game
