= 1972 Montana State Bobcats football team =

American college football season

1972 Montana State Bobcats football

Big Sky champion
- Conference: Big Sky Conference
- Record: 8–3 (5–1 Big Sky)
- Head coach: Sonny Holland (2nd season)
- Offensive coordinator: Don Christensen (2nd season)
- Defensive coordinator: Sonny Lubick (2nd season)
- Home stadium: Van Winkle Stadium

1972 Big Sky Conference football standings
	Conf.					Overall
Team	W		L		T	W		L		T
Montana State $	5	–	1	–	0	8	–	3	–	0
Idaho State	4	–	1	–	0	7	–	3	–	0
Boise State	3	–	3	–	0	7	–	4	–	0
Montana	3	–	3	–	0	3	–	8	–	0
Idaho	2	–	3	–	0	4	–	7	–	0
Weber State	2	–	4	–	0	5	–	5	–	0
Northern Arizona	0	–	4	–	0	3	–	8	–	0
$ – Conference champion

The 1972 Montana State Bobcats football team was an American football team that represented Montana State University in the Big Sky Conference during the 1972 NCAA College Division football season. In their second season under head coach Sonny Holland, the Bobcats compiled an 8–3 record (5–1 against Big Sky opponents) and won the Big Sky championship.

For this season only, home games were played at Van Winkle Stadium at Bozeman High School.

The Bobcat offense featured flanker Sam McCullum, who led the conference in scoring.

== Schedule ==
Date	Opponent	Site	Result	Attendance	Source
September 9	at North Dakota*	Memorial Stadium; Grand Forks, ND	L 28–48	7,500	
September 16	North Dakota State*	Memorial Stadium; Great Falls, MT	W 27–24	5,500–6,500	
September 23	at Cal Poly*	Mustang Stadium; San Luis Obispo, CA	L 7–34	6,200	
September 30	Idaho	Van Winkle Stadium; Bozeman, MT	W 17–3	6,000–6,500	
October 7	Northern Arizona	Van Winkle Stadium; Bozeman, MT	W 23–9	5,500	
October 14	at Weber State	Wildcat Stadium; Ogden, UT	W 9–3	9,036	
October 21	No. 7 Boise State^{†}	Van Winkle Stadium; Bozeman, MT	W 37–10	7,000	
October 28	Idaho State	Van Winkle Stadium; Bozeman, MT	L 16–20	5,200	
November 4	at Montana	Dornblaser Field; Missoula, MT (rivalry)	W 21–3	12,600	
November 11	at Simon Fraser*	Empire Stadium; Vancouver, BC	W 35–14	2,500	
November 18	at Fresno State*	Ratcliffe Stadium; Fresno, CA	W 10–6	5,278–7,000	
*Non-conference game; ^{†}Homecoming; Rankings from AP Poll released prior to the game
