= 1972 Arizona Wildcats football team =

American college football season

1972 Arizona Wildcats football
- Conference: Western Athletic Conference
- Record: 4–7 (4–3 WAC)
- Head coach: Bob Weber (4th season)
- Home stadium: Arizona Stadium

1972 Western Athletic Conference football standings
	Conf.					Overall
Team	W		L		T	W		L		T
No. 13 Arizona State $	5	–	1	–	0	10	–	2	–	0
BYU	5	–	2	–	0	7	–	4	–	0
Utah	5	–	2	–	0	6	–	5	–	0
Arizona	4	–	3	–	0	4	–	7	–	0
Wyoming	3	–	4	–	0	4	–	7	–	0
New Mexico	2	–	4	–	0	3	–	8	–	0
Colorado State	1	–	4	–	0	1	–	10	–	0
UTEP	1	–	6	–	0	2	–	8	–	0
$ – Conference champion; Rankings from AP Poll

The 1972 Arizona Wildcats football team represented the University of Arizona in the Western Athletic Conference (WAC) during the 1972 NCAA University Division football season. In their fourth and final season under head coach Bob Weber, the Wildcats compiled a 4–7 record (4–3 against WAC opponents), finished in fourth place in the WAC, and were outscored by their opponents, 271 to 226. The team played its home games in Arizona Stadium in Tucson, Arizona.

Weber was fired after the season due to his failure to produce winning records.

The team's statistical leaders included Bill Demory with 1,175 passing yards, Bob McCall with 1,148 rushing yards, and Barry Dean with 414 receiving yards.

== Schedule ==
Date	Opponent	Site	Result	Attendance	Source
September 9	Colorado State	Arizona Stadium; Tucson, AZ	W 17–0	30,000	
September 16	at Oregon*	Autzen Stadium; Eugene, OR	L 7–34	30,000	
September 23	Washington State*	Arizona Stadium; Tucson, AZ	L 6–28	30,000	
October 7	at No. 14 UCLA*	Los Angeles Memorial Coliseum; Los Angeles, CA	L 31–42	27,321	
October 14	at New Mexico	University Stadium; Albuquerque, NM (rivalry)	W 27–15	15,672	
October 21	at Texas Tech*	Jones Stadium; Lubbock, TX	L 10–35	33,320	
October 28	UTEP	Arizona Stadium; Tucson, AZ	W 45–22	28,000	
November 4	at Utah	Robert Rice Stadium; Salt Lake City, UT	L 27–28	19,236	
November 11	BYU	Arizona Stadium; Tucson, AZ	W 21–7	26,500	
November 18	Wyoming	Arizona Stadium; Tucson, AZ	L 14–22	30,500	
November 25	No. 18 Arizona State	Arizona Stadium; Tucson, AZ (rivalry)	L 21–38	38,500	
*Non-conference game; Rankings from AP Poll released prior to the game

== After the season ==
Soon after losing to Arizona State, the Wildcats fired Weber and had to search for a new coach. Weber went 16–26 at Arizona and lost all four meetings against ASU. The team had been underperforming with Weber in charge and fans called for Weber to fired. Arizona did not post any winning seasons under Weber and that the inability to beat Arizona State was a main reason for his dismissal.

After a national coaching search, the Wildcats hired Michigan defensive coordinator Jim Young as the new head coach for the 1973 season.
