= Drane Scrivener =

American football player (born 1951)

No. 34, 18
- Position: Cornerback

Personal information
- Born: January 28, 1951 (age 75); Louisville, Kentucky, U.S.
- Listed height: 6 ft 0 in (1.83 m)
- Listed weight: 190 lb (86 kg)

Career information
- High school: Male (KY)
- College: Tulsa
- NFL draft: 1973: 4th round, 98th overall pick

Career history
- Dallas Cowboys (1973)*; Birmingham Americans (1974); Chicago Fire (1974); Dallas Cowboys (1975)*
- * Offseason or practice squad member only

Awards and highlights
- First-team All-American (1972); All-MVC (1972)

Drane W. Scrivener (born January 28, 1951), formerly known as Drane Crumes, is an American former football player. He played college football for the Tulsa Golden Hurricane and was selected as a first-team player on the 1972 All-America college football team. He also played football in the World Football League (WFL) for the Birmingham Americans and Chicago Fire during the 1974 WFL season.

== Early life ==
Scrivener was born in 1951 in Louisville, Kentucky. He attended Louisville's Male High School where he was co-captain of the track team. At the Kentucky state meet in May 1969, he led Male to a state championship, tallying 20 of the school's 41 points. He won the 180-yard low hurdles and the long jump and placed second in the 100-yard dash and the triple jump.

== College career ==
In the fall of 1969, Scrivener enrolled at Cisco Junior College in Cisco, Texas. After one year at Cisco, he transferred as a sophomore to the University of Tulsa. During the 1970 season, he was a backup halfback for the 1970 Tulsa Golden Hurricane football team. He tallied 103 rushing yards on 19 carries for an average of 5.4 yards per carry.

As a junior in 1971, Scrivener asked to be transferred to the defensive secondary and became a full-time starter at cornerback. As a senior, he was selected as the most valuable player on the 1972 Tulsa Golden Hurricane football team, as he led Tulsa's secondary to a No. 3 national ranking in pass defense. After the 1972 season, he received All-Missouri Valley Conference honors. He was also selected by the Newspaper Enterprise Association (NEA) as a first-team defensive back on the 1972 All-America college football team.

Scrivener also played in the Blue–Gray Football Classic and the 1973 American Bowl. He returned a punt for 71 yards in the American Bowl. He also competed in the long jump for the Tulsa track team.

== Professional career ==
Scrivener was selected by the Dallas Cowboys in the fourth round (98th overall) of the 1973 NFL draft. He attended the Cowboys' training camp, but he contracted a virus in his chest and was advised by his doctor not to play during the 1972 season. He was released by the Cowboys in September 1973.

In February 1974, Scrivener signed a multi-year contract with the Birmingham Americans of the World Football League (WFL). He was released on September 18.

In 1975, Scrivener was signed by the Dallas Cowboys as a free agent, but was released after a team doctor concluded that he was unable to play due to a back injury sustained in college and an abnormal heartbeat that he had since childhood. Scrivener noted at the time that a doctor had cleared him to play in Birmingham one year earlier, and he believed he was being given the run-around. Scrivener chose not to return to the WFL and retired from football.

== Later life and honors ==
After his football career ended, Scrivener became a fire inspector for the Louisville Fire Department. He is also a published author on fire safety issues involving children with special needs, newborns, and older adults.

In 1990, he was inducted into the University of Tulsa Athletics Hall of Fame. In 1999, he was named to the third-team on the Tulsa Football All-Century Team.
