= 1972 San Jose State Spartans football team =

American college football season

1972 San Jose State Spartans football
- Conference: Pacific Coast Athletic Association
- Record: 4–7 (1–3 PCAA)
- Head coach: Dewey King (3rd season)
- Home stadium: Spartan Stadium

1972 Pacific Coast Athletic Association football standings
	Conf.					Overall
Team	W		L		T	W		L		T
San Diego State $	4	–	0	–	0	10	–	1	–	0
Pacific (CA)	3	–	1	–	0	8	–	3	–	0
Fresno State	1	–	3	–	0	6	–	4	–	1
Long Beach State	1	–	3	–	0	5	–	6	–	0
San Jose State	1	–	3	–	0	4	–	7	–	0
Cal State Los Angeles*	0	–	0	–	0	3	–	7	–	0
$ – Conference champion; * – Did not compete for conference title

The 1972 San Jose State Spartans football team represented California State University, San Jose (Note: San Jose State University was known as California State University, San Jose from 1972 to 1973.) during the 1972 NCAA University Division football season as a member of the Pacific Coast Athletic Association. (Note: The Big West Conference was known as the Pacific Coast Athletic Association from its founding in 1969 through 1987.) The team was led by third-year head coach Dewey King. They played home games at Spartan Stadium in San Jose, California. The Spartans finished the season with a record of four wins, seven losses (4–7, 1–3 PCAA).

== Schedule ==
Date	Time	Opponent	Site	Result	Attendance	Source
September 9	7:30 p.m.	Santa Clara*	Spartan Stadium; San Jose, CA	W 33–28	18,110	
September 16	1:30 p.m.	at Stanford*	Stanford Stadium; Stanford, CA (rivalry)	L 0–44	48,500	
September 23	1:35 p.m.	at California*	California Memorial Stadium; Berkeley, CA	W 17–10	28,000–28,691	
September 30	7:30 p.m.	Fresno State	Spartan Stadium; San Jose, CA (rivalry)	L 21–23	16,500–17,150	
October 7	7:30 p.m.	at San Diego State	San Diego Stadium; San Diego, CA	L 12–23	35,030	
October 21	2:00 p.m.	at Pacific (CA)	Pacific Memorial Stadium; Stockton, CA (Victory Bell)	L 28–38	15,623–15,625	
October 28	7:30 p.m.	Long Beach State^{†}	Spartan Stadium; San Jose, CA	W 35–8	14,700	
November 4		at New Mexico*	University Stadium; Albuquerque, NM	W 14–7	14,199–14,396	
November 11	1:30 p.m.	at Oregon*	Autzen Stadium; Eugene, OR	L 2–27	27,500	
November 18	6:30 p.m.	at No. 18 Arizona State*	Sun Devil Stadium; Tempe, AZ	L 21–51	43,912	
November 25	10:30 p.m.	at Hawaii*	Honolulu Stadium; Honolulu, HI (rivalry)	L 14–28	14,912	
*Non-conference game; ^{†}Homecoming; Rankings from AP Poll released prior to the game; All times are in Pacific time

== Team players in the NFL ==
The following were selected in the 1973 NFL draft.

Player	Position	Round	Overall	NFL team
Cody Jones	Defensive tackle – Defensive end	5	115	Los Angeles Rams
