= 1972 Cal Poly Pomona Broncos football team =

American college football season

1972 Cal Poly Pomona Broncos football
- Conference: California Collegiate Athletic Association
- Record: 4–6 (0–4 CCAA)
- Head coach: Roy Anderson (4th season)
- Home stadium: Kellogg Field

1972 California Collegiate Athletic Association football standings
	Conf.					Overall
Team	W		L		T	W		L		T
No. 3/3 Cal Poly +	3	–	0	–	0	8	–	1	–	1
UC Riverside +	3	–	0	–	0	9	–	1	–	0
Cal State Fullerton	2	–	2	–	0	7	–	4	–	0
Cal State Northridge	1	–	3	–	0	6	–	5	–	0
Cal Poly Pomona	0	–	4	–	0	4	–	6	–	0
+ – Conference co-champions; Rankings from AP/UPI small college polls

The 1972 Cal Poly Pomona Broncos football team represented California State Polytechnic University, Pomona as a member of the California Collegiate Athletic Association (CCAA) during the 1972 NCAA College Division football season. Led by fourth-year head coach Roy Anderson, Cal Poly Pomona compiled an overall record of 4–6 with a mark of 0–4 in conference play, placing last out of five teams in the CCAA. The team was outscored by its opponents 230 to 222 for the season. The Broncos played home games at Kellogg Field in Pomona, California.

== Schedule ==
Date	Opponent	Site	Result	Attendance	Source
September 16	Southern Utah State*	Kellogg Field; Pomona, CA	W 22–8	2,132	
September 23	at Sacramento State*	Hornet Stadium; Sacramento, CA	W 13–7	4,300	
September 30	at Cal State Los Angeles*	Campus Stadium; Los Angeles, CA	L 20–31	3,500	
October 7	at Cal Lutheran*	Mt. Clef Field; Thousand Oaks, CA	W 22–14	2,250–3,500	
October 14	at Occidental*	D. W. Patterson Field; Los Angeles, CA	W 61–21	1,500	
October 21	UC Riverside	Kellogg Field; Pomona, CA	L 7–10	3,400	
October 28	at Cal State Fullerton	Santa Ana Stadium; Santa Ana, CA	L 13–27	1,500–3,000	
November 4	Cal State Northridge	Kellogg Field; Pomona, CA	L 35–56	2,000–2,542	
November 18	No. 3 Cal Poly	Kellogg Field; Pomona, CA	L 16–21	3,200–3,500	
November 25	United States International*	Kellogg Field; Pomona, CA	L 13–35	2,700	
*Non-conference game; Rankings from AP Poll released prior to the game
