= 1972 Wyoming Cowboys football team =

American college football season

1972 Wyoming Cowboys football
- Conference: Western Athletic Conference
- Record: 4–7 (3–4 WAC)
- Head coach: Fritz Shurmur (2nd season)
- Captains: Nick Bebout; Ed Schmidt
- Home stadium: War Memorial Stadium

1972 Western Athletic Conference football standings
	Conf.					Overall
Team	W		L		T	W		L		T
No. 13 Arizona State $	5	–	1	–	0	10	–	2	–	0
BYU	5	–	2	–	0	7	–	4	–	0
Utah	5	–	2	–	0	6	–	5	–	0
Arizona	4	–	3	–	0	4	–	7	–	0
Wyoming	3	–	4	–	0	4	–	7	–	0
New Mexico	2	–	4	–	0	3	–	8	–	0
Colorado State	1	–	4	–	0	1	–	10	–	0
UTEP	1	–	6	–	0	2	–	8	–	0
$ – Conference champion; Rankings from AP Poll

The 1972 Wyoming Cowboys football team represented the University of Wyoming as a member of the Western Athletic Conference (WAC) during the 1972 NCAA University Division football season. Led by second-year head coach Fritz Shurmur, the Cowboys compiled a record of 4–7 (3–4 against conference opponents), placing fifth in the WAC. The team played home games on campus at War Memorial Stadium in Laramie, Wyoming.

== Schedule ==
Date	Time	Opponent	Site	Result	Attendance	Source
September 9		Idaho State*	War Memorial Stadium; Laramie, WY	W 30–14	20,107	
September 16	1:31 p.m.	at Air Force*	Falcon Stadium; Colorado Springs, CO	L 14–45	38,809	
September 23		at Kansas*	Memorial Stadium; Lawrence, KS	L 14–52	40,108	
September 30		No. 11 Arizona State	War Memorial Stadium; Laramie, WY	W 45–43	19,298	
October 7		New Mexico	War Memorial Stadium; Laramie, WY	L 14–17	18,973	
October 14		at Colorado State	Hughes Stadium; Fort Collins, CO (rivalry)	W 28–9	20,325	
October 21		Utah	War Memorial Stadium; Laramie, WY	L 6–27	13,185	
October 28		Utah State*^{†}	War Memorial Stadium; Laramie, WY (rivalry)	L 23–35	15,371	
November 4		at BYU	Cougar Stadium; Provo, UT	L 14–33	22,373	
November 11		at UTEP	Sun Bowl; El Paso, TX	L 13–20	4,600	
November 25		at Arizona	Arizona Stadium; Tucson, AZ	W 22–14	30,500	
*Non-conference game; ^{†}Homecoming; Rankings from AP Poll released prior to the game; All times are in Mountain time
