= 1972 Pioneer Bowl =

Tennessee State Tigers	Drake Bulldogs
(10–1)	(7–4)
29	7
Head coach: John Merritt	Head coach: Jack Wallace
	1	2	3	4	Total
Tennessee State	14	8	0	7	29
Drake	0	0	7	0	7
- Date: December 9, 1972
- Season: 1972
- Stadium: Memorial Stadium
- Location: Wichita Falls, Texas
- National anthem: Marching Bands
- Halftime show: Marching Bands
- Attendance: 15,000

The 1972 Pioneer Bowl was a college football bowl game in Texas, played between the Drake Bulldogs and Tennessee State at Memorial Stadium in Wichita Falls. The second edition of the Pioneer Bowl, it was one of four regional finals in the College Division played on December 9. The division became Division II (and III) the following season.

Tennessee State jumped out early and built a 22–0 halftime lead; each team scored a second half touchdown and the final score was 29–7. It was the Tigers' fourth consecutive bowl win.
