= 1972 Cal State Los Angeles Diablos football team =

American college football season

1972 Cal State Los Angeles Diablos football
- Conference: Pacific Coast Athletic Association
- Record: 3–7 (0–0 PCAA)
- Head coach: Foster Andersen (2nd season)
- Home stadium: Campus Stadium

1972 Pacific Coast Athletic Association football standings
	Conf.					Overall
Team	W		L		T	W		L		T
San Diego State $	4	–	0	–	0	10	–	1	–	0
Pacific (CA)	3	–	1	–	0	8	–	3	–	0
Fresno State	1	–	3	–	0	6	–	4	–	1
Long Beach State	1	–	3	–	0	5	–	6	–	0
San Jose State	1	–	3	–	0	4	–	7	–	0
Cal State Los Angeles*	0	–	0	–	0	3	–	7	–	0
$ – Conference champion; * – Did not compete for conference title

The 1972 Cal State Los Angeles Diablos football team represented California State University, Los Angeles as a member of the Pacific Coast Athletic Association (PCAA) during the 1972 NCAA University Division football season. The two games played against PCAA teams did not count in the conference standings. Led by second-year head coach Foster Andersen, Cal State Los Angeles compiled an overall record of 3–7. The team was outscored 257 to 155 for the season. The Diablos played home games at the Campus Stadium in Los Angeles.

== Schedule ==
Date	Time	Opponent	Site	Result	Attendance	Source
September 23		at UNLV*	Las Vegas Stadium; Whitney, NV	L 0–31	6,245	
September 30		Cal Poly Pomona*	Campus Stadium; Los Angeles, CA	W 31–20	3,500	
October 7		San Diego*	Campus Stadium; Los Angeles, CA	W 29–16	3,500	
October 14		Azusa Pacific*	Campus Stadium, CA; Los Angeles, CA	W 21–10	3,000	
October 21		at Fresno State*	Ratcliffe Stadium; Fresno, CA	L 0–31	8,104	
October 28		United States International*	Campus Stadium; Los Angeles, CA	L 20–21	1,200	
November 4	1:30 p.m.	at Pacific (CA)*	Pacific Memorial Stadium; Stockton, CA	L 21–36	5,218–5,785	
November 11		at Cal Lutheran*	Mt. Clef Field; Thousand Oaks, CA	L 12–27	2,500	
November 18		at Cal State Northridge*	Devonshire Downs; Northridge, CA	L 7–35	2,500	
November 24		at Cal State Fullerton*	Santa Ana Stadium; Santa Ana, CA	L 14–30	2,444–3,200	
*Non-conference game; All times are in Pacific time
