= 1972 Utah Utes football team =

American college football season

1972 Utah Utes football
- Conference: Western Athletic Conference
- Record: 6–5 (5–2 WAC)
- Head coach: Bill Meek (5th season)
- Defensive coordinator: Jim LaRue (5th season)
- Home stadium: Robert Rice Stadium

1972 Western Athletic Conference football standings
	Conf.					Overall
Team	W		L		T	W		L		T
No. 13 Arizona State $	5	–	1	–	0	10	–	2	–	0
BYU	5	–	2	–	0	7	–	4	–	0
Utah	5	–	2	–	0	6	–	5	–	0
Arizona	4	–	3	–	0	4	–	7	–	0
Wyoming	3	–	4	–	0	4	–	7	–	0
New Mexico	2	–	4	–	0	3	–	8	–	0
Colorado State	1	–	4	–	0	1	–	10	–	0
UTEP	1	–	6	–	0	2	–	8	–	0
$ – Conference champion; Rankings from AP Poll

The 1972 Utah Utes football team was an American football team that represented the University of Utah as a member of the Western Athletic Conference (WAC) during the 1972 NCAA University Division football season. In their fifth season under head coach Bill Meek, the Utes compiled an overall record of 6–5 with a mark of 5–2 against conference opponents, tying for second place in the WAC. Home games were played on campus at Robert Rice Stadium in Salt Lake City.

== Schedule ==
Date	Opponent	Site	Result	Attendance	Source
September 16	at Texas Tech*	Jones Stadium; Lubbock, TX	L 2–45	38,180	
September 23	at Iowa State*	Clyde Williams Field; Ames, IA	L 22–44	28,885	
September 30	at Washington State*	Martin Stadium; Pullman, WA	W 44–25	20,200	
October 7	UTEP	Robert Rice Stadium; Salt Lake City, UT	W 39–20	20,860	
October 14	at Arizona State	Sun Devil Stadium; Tempe, AZ	L 48–59	49,168	
October 21	at Wyoming	War Memorial Stadium; Laramie, WY	W 27–6	13,185	
October 28	New Mexico^{†}	Robert Rice Stadium; Salt Lake City, UT	W 59–14	21,869	
November 4	Arizona	Robert Rice Stadium; Salt Lake City, UT	W 28–27	19,236	
November 11	at Utah State*	Romney Stadium; Logan, UT (rivalry)	L 16–44	19,434	
November 18	BYU	Robert Rice Stadium; Salt Lake City, UT (rivalry)	L 7–16	24,917	
November 25	Colorado State	Robert Rice Stadium; Salt Lake City, UT	W 62–36	10,839	
*Non-conference game; ^{†}Homecoming

== Game summaries ==
=== BYU ===
BYU Cougars (5–4) at Utah Utes (5–4)

Quarter	1	2	3	4	Total
BYU	7	2	0	7	16
Utah	0	0	7	0	7

at Robert Rice Stadium, Salt Lake City, Utah

- Date: November 18, 1972
- Game weather: Overcast, 47 °F (8 °C)
- Game attendance: 24,917
- Box Score

Game information

First quarter

- BYU – Steve Stratton 4-yard run (John Monahan kick). BYU 7–0.

Second quarter

- BYU – Safety. BYU 9–0.

Third quarter

- UTAH – Ike Spencer 70-yard run (Fleming Jensen kick). BYU 9–7.

Fourth quarter

- BYU – George Gourley 24-yard interception return (John Monahan kick). BYU 16–7.

Top passers

- BYU – Dave Terry – 7/13, 71 yards
- UTAH – Daniel Payne – 3/17, 38 yards, 4 INT

Top rushers

- BYU – Pete Van Valkenburg – 37 rushes, 158 yards
- UTAH – Ike Spencer – 11 rushes, 101 yards, TD

Top receivers

- BYU – John Betham – 3 receptions, 32 yards
- UTAH – Stephen Odom – 2 receptions, 20 yards

== Personnel ==
1972 Utah Utes football team roster
Players			Coaches
Offense: Pos. / # / Name / Class; QB / / Don Van Galder / Jr	Defense: Pos. / # / Name / Class	Special teams: Pos. / # / Name / Class	Head coach: Bill Meek (5th year); Coordinators/assistant coaches Legend: (C) Team captain; (S) Suspended; (I) Ineligible; Injured; Redshirt
