= 1972 Fresno State Bulldogs football team =

American college football season

1972 Fresno State Bulldogs football
- Conference: Pacific Coast Athletic Association
- Record: 6–4–1 (1–3 CCAA)
- Head coach: Darryl Rogers (7th season)
- Defensive coordinator: Bob Padilla (5th season)
- Home stadium: Ratcliffe Stadium

1972 Pacific Coast Athletic Association football standings
	Conf.					Overall
Team	W		L		T	W		L		T
San Diego State $	4	–	0	–	0	10	–	1	–	0
Pacific (CA)	3	–	1	–	0	8	–	3	–	0
Fresno State	1	–	3	–	0	6	–	4	–	1
Long Beach State	1	–	3	–	0	5	–	6	–	0
San Jose State	1	–	3	–	0	4	–	7	–	0
Cal State Los Angeles*	0	–	0	–	0	3	–	7	–	0
$ – Conference champion; * – Did not compete for conference title

The 1972 Fresno State Bulldogs football team represented California State University, Fresno as a member of the Pacific Coast Athletic Association (PCAA) during the 1972 NCAA University Division football season. Led by Darryl Rogers in his seventh and final season as head coach, Fresno State compiled an overall record of 6–4–1 with a mark of 1–3 in conference play, tying for third place in the PCAA. The Bulldogs played their home games at Ratcliffe Stadium on the campus of Fresno City College in Fresno, California.

== Schedule ==
Date	Time	Opponent	Site	Result	Attendance	Source
September 9		Sacramento State*	Ratcliffe Stadium; Fresno, CA	W 24–7	6,913	
September 16	7:30 p.m.	Western Michigan*	Ratcliffe Stadium; Fresno, CA	W 41–14	7,799	
September 23		at New Mexico State*	Memorial Stadium; Las Cruces, NM	W 49–17	8,053	
September 30	7:30 p.m.	at San Jose State	Spartan Stadium; San Jose, CA (rivalry)	W 23–21	16,500–17,150	
October 7	7:30 p.m.	Pacific (CA)	Ratcliffe Stadium; Fresno, CA	L 0–17	14,071	
October 14		Cal Poly*	Ratcliffe Stadium; Fresno, CA	T 24–24	13,334–14,300	
October 21		Cal State Los Angeles*	Ratcliffe Stadium; Fresno, CA	W 31–0	8,104	
October 28		at San Diego State	San Diego Stadium; San Diego, CA (rivalry)	L 14–21	23,653	
November 4	7:30 p.m.	Long Beach State	Ratcliffe Stadium; Fresno, CA	L 16–21	11,000	
November 11	11:30 a.m.	at Northern Illinois*	Huskie Stadium; DeKalb, IL	W 9–6	6,696	
November 18		Montana State*	Ratcliffe Stadium; Fresno, CA	L 6–10	5,278–7,000	
*Non-conference game; All times are in Pacific time

== Team players in the NFL ==
The following were selected in the 1973 NFL draft.

Player	Position	Round	Overall	NFL team
Dwayne Crump	Defensive back	6	137	St. Louis Cardinals
Gary Weaver	Linebacker	7	179	Oakland Raiders
