= Oliver Ross (running back) =

American football player (born 1949)

No. 30
- Position: Running back

Personal information
- Born: September 18, 1949 (age 77); Gainesville, Florida, U.S.
- Listed height: 6 ft 0 in (1.83 m)
- Listed weight: 210 lb (95 kg)

Career information
- High school: Gainesville
- College: Alabama A&M
- NFL draft: 1973: 16th round, 398th overall pick

Career history
- Denver Broncos (1973–1975); Seattle Seahawks (1976)

Career NFL statistics
- Rushing attempts: 63
- Rushing yards: 173
- Receptions: 10
- Receiving yards: 104
- Stats at Pro Football Reference

Oliver Stevenson Ross (born September 18, 1949) is an American former professional football player who was a running back in the National Football League (NFL). He played college football for the Alabama A&M Bulldogs. He played in the NFL for the Denver Broncos (1973–1975) and the Seattle Seahawks (1976).
