= Ron Lou =

American football player (born 1951)

No. 51, 53
- Position: Center

Personal information
- Born: July 24, 1951 (age 75); Los Angeles, California, U.S.
- Listed height: 6 ft 2 in (1.88 m)
- Listed weight: 240 lb (109 kg)

Career information
- High school: Montebello (Montebello, California)
- College: Arizona State
- NFL draft: 1973: 14th round, 339th overall pick

Career history
- Houston Oilers (1973–1974); Philadelphia Eagles (1975); Houston Oilers (1976)
- Stats at Pro Football Reference

Ronald Wayne Lou (born July 24, 1951) is an American former professional football center who played in the National Football League (NFL) with the Houston Oilers and Philadelphia Eagles. He played college football for the Arizona State Sun Devils and was selected by the Oilers in the 14th round of the 1973 NFL draft.

== Early life ==
Ronald Wayne Lou was born on July 24, 1951, in Los Angeles, California. He attended Montebello High School in Montebello, California.

== College career ==
Lou enrolled at Arizona State University to play college football for the Sun Devils. He was on the freshman team in 1969 and a three-year varsity letterman from 1970 to 1972.

== Professional career ==
Lou was selected by the Houston Oilers in the 14th round, with the 339th overall pick, of the 1973 NFL draft. He played in nine games, starting one, for the Oilers as a rookie in 1973 and recovered one fumble. He spent the entire 1974 season on injured reserve. Lou was the team's third-string center going into the 1975 season behind Fred Hoaglin and Carl Mauck. Lou requested his release, stating "I was going downhill because there wasn't enough work for me". He was waived on August 12, 1975.

Lou signed with the Philadelphia Eagles on August 26, 1975. He played in all 14 games, starting two, for the Eagles in 1975. He was released on August 26, 1976.

Lou was claimed off waivers by the Oilers on September 7, 1976. He appeared in all 14 games in a reserve role in 1976.

== Personal life ==
Lou has worked in the restaurant industry since his NFL career. He opened a breakfast restaurant, a sports bar, and three Chinese restaurants. In 2013, he opened the Angry Crab Shack in Mesa, Arizona.
