= 1972 BYU Cougars football team =

American college football season

1972 BYU Cougars football
- Conference: Western Athletic Conference
- Record: 7–4 (5–2 WAC)
- Head coach: LaVell Edwards (1st season)
- Offensive coordinator: Dave Kragthorpe (3rd season)
- Offensive scheme: West Coast
- Defensive coordinator: Dick Felt (1st season)
- Base defense: 4–3
- Home stadium: Cougar Stadium

1972 Western Athletic Conference football standings
	Conf.					Overall
Team	W		L		T	W		L		T
No. 13 Arizona State $	5	–	1	–	0	10	–	2	–	0
BYU	5	–	2	–	0	7	–	4	–	0
Utah	5	–	2	–	0	6	–	5	–	0
Arizona	4	–	3	–	0	4	–	7	–	0
Wyoming	3	–	4	–	0	4	–	7	–	0
New Mexico	2	–	4	–	0	3	–	8	–	0
Colorado State	1	–	4	–	0	1	–	10	–	0
UTEP	1	–	6	–	0	2	–	8	–	0
$ – Conference champion; Rankings from AP Poll

The 1972 BYU Cougars football team represented Brigham Young University (BYU) for the 1972 NCAA University Division football season. It was their first year under head coach LaVell Edwards and the Cougars finished over .500 for the first time since 1969.

== Schedule ==
Date	Time	Opponent	Site	Result	Attendance	Source
September 16		Kansas State*	Cougar Stadium; Provo, UT	W 32–9	31,753	
September 23		Utah State*	Cougar Stadium; Provo, UT (rivalry)	L 19–42	35,239	
September 30		at Oregon State*	Parker Stadium; Corvallis, OR	L 3–29	20,065	
October 7	2:00 p.m.	at Long Beach State*	Anaheim Stadium; Anaheim, CA	W 38–27	11,529	
October 14		UTEP^{†}	Cougar Stadium; Provo, UT	W 21–14	31,176	
October 21		No. 19 Arizona State	Cougar Stadium; Provo, UT	L 17–49	23,561	
October 28		at Colorado State	Hughes Stadium; Fort Collins, CO	W 44–8	18,972	
November 4		Wyoming	Cougar Stadium; Provo, UT	W 33–14	22,373	
November 11		at Arizona	Arizona Stadium; Tucson, AZ	L 7–21	26,500	
November 18		Utah	Robert Rice Stadium; Salt Lake City, UT (Holy War)	W 16–7	24,917	
November 25		at New Mexico	University Stadium; Albuquerque, NM	W 21–7	9,490	
*Non-conference game; ^{†}Homecoming; Rankings from AP Poll released prior to the game; All times are in Mountain time

== Preseason ==
Defensive coordinator LaVell Edwards was promoted to head coach in January to take over for the departed Tommy Hudspeth, who ended up as the head coach at UTEP by season's end.

BYU was returning 28 players from the previous year but Golden Richards would not be one of them. Richards claimed it was because the Cougars were still a run-oriented offense while BYU and Edwards said it was because Richards had trouble keeping with his academics.

== Game summaries ==
=== Kansas State ===
Pete Van Valkenburg rushed for 164 yards on 16 carries, scored on a 59-yard run in the first quarter and set up Dave Terry for BYU's second touchdown. Keith Brumley's 37-yard field goal was Kansas State's only points through the first three quarters. Henry Childs caught a 27-yard touchdown pass from Dennis Morrison three minutes into the final quarter for Kansas State.

=== At Long Beach State ===
Quarter	1	2	3	4	Total
BYU	0	10	14	14	38
Long Beach State	14	6	0	7	27

at Anaheim Stadium, Anaheim, CA

- Date: October 7
- Game time: 8:00 p.m. PDT
- Game attendance: 11,500
- Box Score

Scoring summary

Quarter	Time	Drive			Team	Scoring information	Score	
Quarter	Time	Plays	Yards	TOP	Team	Scoring information	BYU	Long Beach State
1					Long Beach State	Drake 1-yard touchdown run, Logue kick good	0	7
1					Long Beach State	Drake 1-yard touchdown run, Logue kick good	0	14
2					BYU	Pete Van Valkenburg 3-yard touchdown run, John Monahan kick good	7	14
2					BYU	31-yard field goal by John Monahan	10	14
3					Long Beach State	Newsome 28-yard interception return, kick blocked	10	20
3					BYU	Pete Van Valkenburg 64-yard touchdown run, John Monahan kick good	17	20
3					BYU	Dave Atkinson 19-yard interception return, John Monahan kick good	24	20
4					Long Beach State	Fitzpatrick 1-yard touchdown run, Logue kick good	24	27
4					BYU	Pete Van Valkenburg 73-yard touchdown run, John Monahan kick good	31	27
4					BYU	Steve Stratton 7-yard touchdown run, John Monahan kick good	38	27
"TOP" = time of possession. For other American football terms, see Glossary of American football.							38	27

=== At Utah ===
BYU Cougars (5–4) at Utah Utes (5–4)

Quarter	1	2	3	4	Total
BYU	7	2	0	7	16
Utah	0	0	7	0	7

at Robert Rice Stadium, Salt Lake City, Utah

- Date: November 18, 1972
- Game weather: Overcast, 47 °F (8 °C)
- Game attendance: 24,917
- Box Score

Game information

First quarter

- BYU – Steve Stratton 4-yard run (John Monahan kick). BYU 7–0.

Second quarter

- BYU – Safety. BYU 9–0.

Third quarter

- UTAH – Ike Spencer 70-yard run (Fleming Jensen kick). BYU 9–7.

Fourth quarter

- BYU – George Gourley 24-yard interception return (John Monahan kick). BYU 16–7.

Top passers

- BYU – Dave Terry – 7/13, 71 yards
- UTAH – Daniel Payne – 3/17, 38 yards, 4 INT

Top rushers

- BYU – Pete Van Valkenburg – 37 rushes, 158 yards
- UTAH – Ike Spencer – 11 rushes, 101 yards, TD

Top receivers

- BYU – John Betham – 3 receptions, 32 yards
- UTAH – Stephen Odom – 2 receptions, 20 yards

BYU's first win versus Utah since 1967

== Personnel ==
=== Roster ===
1972 BYU Cougars football team roster
Players
Coaches
Offense

Pos.	#	Name	Class
WR	9	Dave Affleck
FB	34	Charlie Ah You
QB	7	Bill August
C	61	Joe Bailey
WR	41	John Betham
FB	36	Wayne Bower
OT	79	Dave Brooks
WR	42	Dave Clark
FB	22	Dean Conway
OT	64	Bill Critchfield
OT	62	Craig Denny
RB	36	Paul Devine
TE	80	Dennis Dorman
G	68	Harold Farnsworth
RB		Gil Gillenwater
QB	15	Brian Gunderson	Sr
C	56	Paul Gustavson
G	78	Paul Howard	Sr
WR	25	Logan Hunter
RB	20	Bryce Johnson
OL	66	Doug Maughan
QB	14	Terry McEwen
G	76	Val Miller
G	71	John Monahan
QB	16	Mark Montgomery	So
OT	70	Paul Muklewicz
OT	53	Ken Peterson
TE	89	Mike Pistorius
OT	65	Steve Price
WR	90	Rick Powell
C	59	Sid Smith
FB	35	Steve Stratton
RB	43	Dan Taylor
QB	13	Dave Terry	Jr
RB	28	Pete Van Valkenburg	Sr
WR	22	Lynn Zwahlen

Defense

Pos.	#	Name	Class
DE	85	Joel Adams	So
LB	45	Doug Adams	So
CB		Dave Atkinson
DT	72	Wayne Baker	So
LB	69	Jerry Burke	So
CB	18	Stan Call	So
LB	67	Larry Carr	So
DE	58	Conrad Cole
S	44	Craig Crompton
LB	54	Steve Draeger
LB	84	Greg Dunn
S	9	Fred EchoHawk	Jr
S	24	Tom EchoHawk	Jr
DB	12	Mike Epperson	So
DE	56	Lloyd Fairbanks
CB	31	Reed Gempler
S	33	George Gourley
S	11	Dan Hansen	Sr
LB	52	Kahlili Hunt
LB	34	Phil Jensen	Fr
CB	26	Paul Karaica
DE	87	Bob Larsen
DT	74	Paul Linford
DT	60	Wally Molifua
LB	57	Larry Nelson	So
DL	83	Orrin Olsen	Fr
LB	50	Mike Preston
DE	46	Roy Robbins
LB	37	Karl Rogoff
DE	88	Ed Rozeski
DT	63	Julian Smilowitz
DB	5	Bennie Smith
LB	51	Scott Stapley
LB	32	Ron Tree	Sr
DE	73	Stan Varner
DT	77	Grant Wells

Special teams

Pos.	#	Name	Class
P	14	Doug Coon
K	19	Dennis Olsen

Head coach

- LaVell Edwards

Coordinators/assistant coaches

- Jim Criner
- Dick Felt (DC/DB)
- J.D. Helm (RB)
- Dave Kragthorpe (OC/OL)
- Mel Olson (JV)
- Dewey Warren (QB/WR)

Legend

- (C) Team captain
- (S) Suspended
- (I) Ineligible
- Injured
- Redshirt

=== Starters ===
==== Offense ====
POS	Name	Name
QB	Dave Terry	
TB	Pete Van Valkenburg	
FB	Steve Stratton	Wayne Bower
WR	Logan Hunter	
WR	John Betham	
TE	Dennis Doman	Mike Pistorius
T	Craig Denny	
G	Paul Howard	
C	Joe Bailey	
G	John Monahan	
T	Steve Price	Dave Brooks

==== Defense ====
POS	Name	Name
DL	Ed Rozeski	
DL	Paul Linford	
DL	Grant Wells	Wayne Baker
DL	Orrin Olsen	Bob Larsen
LB	Ron Tree	
LB	Larry Carr	Kahili Hunt
LB	Phil Jensen	Mike Preston
DB	George Gourley	Bennie Smith
DB	Dave Atkinson	
DB	Craig Compton	
DB	Dan Hansen	

== Statistics ==
=== Passing ===
Player	Comp	Att	Yards	TD	INT
Bill August	69	144	891	5	5
Dave Terry	62	122	742	2	10
Pete Van Valkenburg	2	5	32	1	
John Betham	0	1			

=== Rushing ===
Player	Att	Yards	TD
Pete Van Valkenburg	232	1,386	12
Steve Stratton	78	328	3
Wayne Bower	43	271	1
Dan Taylor	46	161	1
Dave Terry	61	120	2
Gil Gillenwater	3	56	
Bill August	50	22	
Bryce Johnson	1	0	
John Betham	4	-15	

=== Receiving ===
Player	Rec	Yards	TD
Logan Hunter	49	555	2
John Betham	19	345	2
Mike Pistorius	16	314	2
Pete Van Valkenburg	10	98	1
Lynn Zwahlen	5	95	1
Jay Miller	6	30	
Dennis Doman	7	59	
Steve Stratton	8	55	
Dan Taylor	4	45	
Wayne Bower	4	36	
Dave Affleck	3	15	
Dave Terry	1	10	
Bryce Johnson	1	8	

== Awards ==
All-WAC: Dave Atkinson, Dan Hansen, Paul Howard, Paul Linford, Ron Tree, Pete Van Valkenburg

WAC Coach of the Year: LaVell Edwards
