= Mike Askea =

American football player (born 1951)

No. 73
- Position: Tackle

Personal information
- Born: January 7, 1951 (age 75); Steele County, Minnesota, U.S.
- Listed height: 6 ft 4 in (1.93 m)
- Listed weight: 260 lb (118 kg)

Career information
- High school: Visalia (CA)
- College: Stanford
- NFL draft: 1973: 7th round, 165th overall pick

Career history
- Denver Broncos (1973); Portland Storm (1974); Portland Thunder (1975)
- Stats at Pro Football Reference

Mike Askea (born January 7, 1951) is an American former professional football player who was a tackle for the Denver Broncos of the National Football League (NFL) in 1973. He played college football for the Stanford Cardinal.
