= Jim O'Malley =

American football player (born 1951)

No. 66
- Position: Linebacker

Personal information
- Born: July 24, 1951 (age 75); Summit, New Jersey, U.S.
- Listed height: 6 ft 1 in (1.85 m)
- Listed weight: 229 lb (104 kg)

Career information
- High school: Chaney (Youngstown, Ohio)
- College: Notre Dame
- NFL draft: 1973: 12th round, 296th overall pick

Career history
- Denver Broncos (1973–1975)
- Stats at Pro Football Reference

James John O'Malley (born July 24, 1951) is an American former professional football player who was a linebacker who played for the Denver Broncos of the National Football League (NFL). He played college football for the Notre Dame Fighting Irish.
