= Bill Donckers =

American football player (1951–2012)

No. 10
- Position: Quarterback

Personal information
- Born: January 8, 1951; Renton, Washington, U.S.
- Died: December 3, 2012 (aged 61); Bryn Mawr, Washington, U.S.
- Listed height: 6 ft 1 in (1.85 m)
- Listed weight: 205 lb (93 kg)

Career information
- High school: Renton
- College: San Diego State
- NFL draft: 1973: undrafted

Career history
- New England Patriots (1973)*; Oakland Raiders (1974)*; St. Louis Cardinals (1976–1977)
- * Offseason or practice squad member only
- Stats at Pro Football Reference

William Lewis Donckers (January 8, 1951 – December 3, 2012) was an American football quarterback in the National Football League (NFL) who played for the St. Louis Cardinals. He played college football for the San Diego State Aztecs. He also played in the World Football League (WFL) for The Hawaiians.

He died in 2012.
