= 1972 New Mexico Lobos football team =

American college football season

1972 New Mexico Lobos football
- Conference: Western Athletic Conference
- Record: 3–8 (2–4 WAC)
- Head coach: Rudy Feldman (5th season)
- Home stadium: University Stadium

1972 Western Athletic Conference football standings
	Conf.					Overall
Team	W		L		T	W		L		T
No. 13 Arizona State $	5	–	1	–	0	10	–	2	–	0
BYU	5	–	2	–	0	7	–	4	–	0
Utah	5	–	2	–	0	6	–	5	–	0
Arizona	4	–	3	–	0	4	–	7	–	0
Wyoming	3	–	4	–	0	4	–	7	–	0
New Mexico	2	–	4	–	0	3	–	8	–	0
Colorado State	1	–	4	–	0	1	–	10	–	0
UTEP	1	–	6	–	0	2	–	8	–	0
$ – Conference champion; Rankings from AP Poll

The 1972 New Mexico Lobos football team was an American football team that represented the University of New Mexico in the Western Athletic Conference (WAC) during the 1972 NCAA University Division football season. In their fifth season under head coach Rudy Feldman, the Lobos compiled a 3–8 record (2–4 against WAC opponents) and were outscored by a total of 327 to 208.

John Urban and George Oakes were the team captains. The team's statistical leaders included Bruce Boone with 540 passing yards, Fred Henry with 977 rushing yards and 36 points, and Ken Smith with 382 receiving yards.

== Schedule ==
Date	Opponent	Site	Result	Attendance	Source
September 16	New Mexico State*	University Stadium; Albuquerque, NM (rivalry)	W 55–20	24,421	
September 23	Texas Tech*	University Stadium; Albuquerque, NM	L 16–41	24,860	
September 30	at Iowa State*	Clyde Williams Field; Ames, IA	L 0–31	31,000	
October 7	at Wyoming	War Memorial Stadium; Laramie, WY	W 17–14	18,973	
October 14	Arizona	University Stadium; Albuquerque, NM (rivalry)	L 15–27	15,672	
October 21	at UTEP	Sun Bowl; El Paso, TX	W 56–7	10,250	
October 28	at Utah	Robert Rice Stadium; Salt Lake City, UT	L 14–59	21,869	
November 4	San Jose State*^{†}	University Stadium; Albuquerque, NM	L 7–14	14,199–14,396	
November 11	at No. 19 Arizona State	Sun Devil Stadium; Tempe, AZ	L 7–60	44,172	
November 18	at Houston*	Houston Astrodome; Houston, TX	L 14–33	20,366	
November 25	BYU	University Stadium; Albuquerque, NM	L 7–21	9,490	
*Non-conference game; ^{†}Homecoming; Rankings from AP Poll released prior to the game
