= 1972 Colorado State Rams football team =

American college football season

1972 Colorado State Rams football
- Conference: Western Athletic Conference
- Record: 1–10 (1–4 WAC)
- Head coach: Jerry Wampfler (3rd season)
- Defensive coordinator: Fred Conti (2nd season)
- Home stadium: Hughes Stadium

1972 Western Athletic Conference football standings
| | Conf. | | | | | Overall |
| Team | W | | L | | T | W | | L | | T |
|---|---|---|---|---|---|---|---|---|---|---|
| No. 13 Arizona State $ | 5 | – | 1 | – | 0 | 10 | – | 2 | – | 0 |
| BYU | 5 | – | 2 | – | 0 | 7 | – | 4 | – | 0 |
| Utah | 5 | – | 2 | – | 0 | 6 | – | 5 | – | 0 |
| Arizona | 4 | – | 3 | – | 0 | 4 | – | 7 | – | 0 |
| Wyoming | 3 | – | 4 | – | 0 | 4 | – | 7 | – | 0 |
| New Mexico | 2 | – | 4 | – | 0 | 3 | – | 8 | – | 0 |
| Colorado State | 1 | – | 4 | – | 0 | 1 | – | 10 | – | 0 |
| UTEP | 1 | – | 6 | – | 0 | 2 | – | 8 | – | 0 |
$ – Conference champion; Rankings from AP Poll

The 1972 Colorado State Rams football team was an American football team that represented Colorado State University in the Western Athletic Conference (WAC) during the 1972 NCAA University Division football season. In its third and final season under head coach Jerry Wampfler, the team compiled a 1–10 record (1–4 against WAC opponents). They finished tied with UTEP for last in the WAC, and were outscored by a total of 413 to 128, being shutout in four games.

== Schedule ==
| Date | Time | Opponent | Site | Result | Attendance | Source |
|---|---|---|---|---|---|---|
| September 9 | 7:30 p.m. | at Arizona | Arizona Stadium; Tucson, AZ | L 0–17 | 30,000 | |
| September 16 | 1:30 p.m. | Iowa State* | Hughes Stadium; Fort Collins, CO | L 0–41 | 20,651 | |
| September 23 | 6:30 p.m. | at West Texas State* | Kimbrough Memorial Stadium; Canyon, TX | L 14–41 | 14,750 | |
| September 30 | 1:30 p.m. | at Utah State* | Romney Stadium; Logan, UT | L 0–21 | 12,125 | |
| October 7 | 1:30 p.m. | No. 19 Air Force* | Hughes Stadium; Fort Collins, CO (rivalry) | L 13–52 | 23,221 | |
| October 14 | 1:30 p.m. | Wyoming | Hughes Stadium; Fort Collins, CO (rivalry) | L 9–28 | 20,325 | |
| October 21 | 12:00 p.m. | at Florida State* | Doak Campbell Stadium; Tallahassee, FL | L 0–37 | 31,327 | |
| October 28 | 1:30 p.m. | BYU^{†} | Hughes Stadium; Fort Collins, CO | L 8–44 | 18,972 | |
| November 11 | 6:30 p.m. | at Houston* | Houston Astrodome; Houston, TX | L 13–48 | 23,143 | |
| November 18 | 1:00 p.m. | UTEP | Hughes Stadium; Fort Collins, CO | W 35–22 | 14,235 | |
| November 25 | 1:30 p.m. | at Utah | Robert Rice Stadium; Salt Lake City, UT | L 36–62 | 10,839 | |
*Non-conference game; ^{†}Homecoming; Rankings from AP Poll released prior to the game; All times are in Mountain time
