= Sam Sanders =

American gridiron football player and coach (born 1938)

Biographical details
- Born: March 19, 1938 (age 88)

Playing career
- 1956–1959: Buffalo
- 1960: Buffalo Bills*
- Position: Linebacker

Coaching career (HC unless noted)
- 1965–1967: Lehigh (DL)
- 1968: Buffalo (DL)
- 1969–1972: Northern Illinois (DC/RC)
- 1973–1976: Lehigh (DC/RC)
- 1977–1984: Alfred
- 1985–1989: Toronto Argonauts (DL)
- 1990–1991: Buffalo

Administrative career (AD unless noted)
- c. 1960s: Silver Creek HS (NY)

Head coaching record
- Overall: 54–42–2
- Tournaments: 0–1 (NCAA D-III playoffs)

Accomplishments and honors

Championships
- 1 ICAC (1981)

Sam Sanders (born March 19, 1938) is an American former football player and coach. He served as the head football coach at Alfred University from 1977 to 1984 and at the University at Buffalo from 1990 to 1991, compiling a career college football record of 54–42–2.

Sanders played college football for Buffalo as a linebacker. Upon graduating, he signed with the Buffalo Bills briefly before a knee injury forced him into retirement.

Sanders spent time as the athletic director for Silver Creek Central School District before being named the defensive line coach for Lehigh. In 1968, he returned to his alma mater, Buffalo, in the same capacity. In 1969, he was hired as the defensive coordinator and recruiting coordinator for Northern Illinois. He accepted the same positions for Lehigh in 1973.

Sanders was named as the successor to Alex Yunevich for Alfred in 1977.

== Head coaching record ==
Year	Team	Overall	Conference	Standing	Bowl/playoffs
Alfred Saxons (Independent College Athletic Conference) (1977–1984)
1977	Alfred	4–5	1–3	5th	
1978	Alfred	5–4	1–2	3rd	
1979	Alfred	7–2	2–1	T–2nd	
1980	Alfred	7–2–1	2–1	2nd	
1981	Alfred	10–1	3–0	1st	L NCAA Division III Quarterfinal
1982	Alfred	6–4	2–1	2nd	
1983	Alfred	4–5–1	0–2–1	5th	
1984	Alfred	6–4	2–1	2nd	
Alfred:		49–27–2	13–11–1		
Buffalo Bulls (NCAA Division III independent) (1990–1991)
1990	Buffalo	2–8			
1991	Buffalo	3–7			
Buffalo:		5–15			
Total:		54–42–2			
National championship Conference title Conference division title or championship game berth
