= Dave Fagg =

American football and wrestling coach (1936–2024)

Biographical details
- Born: April 27, 1936; High Point, North Carolina, U.S.
- Died: December 30, 2024 (aged 88); Davidson, North Carolina, U.S.

Playing career

Football
- 1955–1957: Davidson
- Position: Tackle

Coaching career (HC unless noted)

Football
- 1962–1963: Garinger HS (NC) (assistant)
- 1964: The Citadel (assistant)
- 1965–1969: Davidson (assistant)
- 1970–1973: Davidson
- 1974–?: Georgia Tech (OC)
- 1978: Georgia Tech (QB/WR)
- 1979–1981: Hawaii (associate HC / OC)
- 1982: South Carolina (OC)
- 1983–1986: Hawaii (OC)
- 1987–1989: Arizona (associate HC)
- 1990–1992: Davidson

Wrestling
- 1962–1965: Garinger HS (NC)
- 1964–1965: The Citadel

Head coaching record
- Overall: 22–45–1 (college football)

David J. Fagg (April 27, 1936 – December 30, 2024) was an American football coach. He served two stints as the head football coach at Davidson College in Davidson, North Carolina, from 1970 to 1973 and 1990 to 1992, compiling a record of 22–45–1. In between his two tenures at Davidson, Fagg was an assistant coach at Georgia Tech, the University of Hawaii, the University of South Carolina, and the University of Arizona.

Fagg attended Davidson, where he was captain of the football and wrestling teams. He later earned a master's degree from Boston University. Fagg began his coaching career in 1962 as head wrestling coach and assistant football coach at Garinger High School in Charlotte, North Carolina. In 1964, he moved on to The Citadel in Charleston, South Carolina to serve in the same two roles for a year. Fagg returned to Davidson in 1965 when he was hired as an assistant on the staff of Homer Smith, who was newly hired as head football coach.

Fagg died on December 30, 2024.

== Head coaching record ==
=== College football ===
Year	Team	Overall	Conference	Standing	Bowl/playoffs
Davidson Wildcats (Southern Conference) (1970–1973)
1970	Davidson	1–10	1–4	7th	
1971	Davidson	1–9	0–6	7th	
1972	Davidson	3–7–1	2–3–1	5th	
1973	Davidson	2–8	1–6	T–7th	
Davidson Wildcats (NCAA Division III independent) (1990–1992)
1990	Davidson	5–3			
1991	Davidson	4–5			
1992	Davidson	5–5			
Davidson:		22–45–1	4–19–1		
Total:		22–45–1			
