= 1972 Clemson Tigers football team =

American college football season

1972 Clemson Tigers football
- Conference: Atlantic Coast Conference
- Record: 4–7 (2–4 ACC)
- Head coach: Hootie Ingram (3rd season)
- Captains: Wade Hughes; Buddy King; Frank Wirth
- Home stadium: Memorial Stadium

1972 Atlantic Coast Conference football standings
	Conf.					Overall
Team	W		L		T	W		L		T
No. 12 North Carolina $	6	–	0	–	0	11	–	1	–	0
No. 17 NC State	4	–	1	–	1	8	–	3	–	1
Maryland	3	–	2	–	1	5	–	5	–	1
Duke	3	–	3	–	0	5	–	6	–	0
Clemson	2	–	4	–	0	4	–	7	–	0
Virginia	1	–	5	–	0	4	–	7	–	0
Wake Forest	1	–	5	–	0	2	–	9	–	0
$ – Conference champion; Rankings from AP Poll

The 1972 Clemson Tigers football team was an American football team that represented Clemson University in the Atlantic Coast Conference (ACC) during the 1972 NCAA University Division football season. In its third and final season under head coach Hootie Ingram, the team compiled a 4–7 record (2–4 against conference opponents), finished fifth in the ACC, and was outscored by a total of 245 to 143. The team played its home games at Memorial Stadium in Clemson, South Carolina.

Head coach Hootie Ingram resigned shortly after the conclusion of the season.

Wade Hughes, Buddy King, and Frank Wirth were the team captains. The team's statistical leaders included quarterback Ken Pengitore with 831 passing yards, running back Wade Hughes with 761 rushing yards, Dennis Goss with 385 receiving yards, and Heide Davis and Wade Hughes with 30 points scored (5 touchdowns each).

No Clemson players were selected by the United Press International as first-team players on the 1972 All-Atlantic Coast Conference football team.

== Schedule ==
Date	Time	Opponent	Site	Result	Attendance	Source
September 9	1:30 p.m.	The Citadel*	Memorial Stadium; Clemson, SC	W 13–0	37,934	
September 23	8:30 p.m.	at Rice*	Rice Stadium; Houston, TX	L 10–29	19,500	
September 30	2:30 p.m.	at No. 2 Oklahoma*	Oklahoma Memorial Stadium; Norman, OK	L 3–52	61,826	
October 7	2:30 p.m.	at Georgia Tech*	Grant Field; Atlanta, GA (rivalry)	L 9–31	48,624	
October 14	1:30 p.m.	Duke	Memorial Stadium; Clemson, SC	L 0–7	32,586	
October 21	1:30 p.m.	Virginia^{†}	Memorial Stadium; Clemson, SC	W 37–21	32,093	
October 28	1:30 p.m.	at Wake Forest	Groves Stadium; Winston-Salem, NC	W 31–0	16,000	
November 4	1:30 p.m.	North Carolina	Memorial Stadium; Clemson, SC	L 10–26	38,235	
November 11	1:30 p.m.	at Maryland	Byrd Stadium; College Park, MD	L 6–31	29,326	
November 18	1:30 p.m.	at NC State	Carter Stadium; Raleigh, NC (rivalry)	L 17–42	31,000	
November 25	1:30 p.m.	South Carolina*	Memorial Stadium; Clemson, SC (rivalry)	W 7–6	51,608	
*Non-conference game; ^{†}Homecoming; Rankings from AP Poll released prior to the game; All times are in Eastern time
