= 1972 Furman Paladins football team =

American college football season

1972 Furman Paladins football
- Conference: Southern Conference
- Record: 2–9 (1–6 SoCon)
- Head coach: Bob King (15th season)
- Captains: Mike Johnson; Marvin Mills; David Shi
- Home stadium: Sirrine Stadium

1972 Southern Conference football standings
	Conf.					Overall
Team	W		L		T	W		L		T
East Carolina $	6	–	0	–	0	9	–	2	–	0
Richmond	5	–	1	–	0	6	–	4	–	0
William & Mary	4	–	2	–	0	5	–	6	–	0
The Citadel	4	–	3	–	0	5	–	6	–	0
Davidson	2	–	3	–	1	3	–	7	–	1
VMI	1	–	5	–	0	2	–	9	–	0
Furman	1	–	6	–	0	2	–	9	–	0
Appalachian State	0	–	3	–	1	5	–	5	–	1
$ – Conference champion

The 1972 Furman Paladins football team was an American football team that represented Furman University as a member of the Southern Conference (SoCon) during the 1972 NCAA University Division football season. In their 15th season under head coach Bob King, Furman compiled a 2–9 record, with a mark of 1–6 in conference play, placing seventh in the SoCon.

== Schedule ==
Date	Opponent	Site	Result	Attendance	Source
September 9	at William & Mary	Cary Field; Williamsburg, VA	L 7–31	8,000	
September 16	Presbyterian*	Sirrine Stadium; Greenville, SC	L 7–10	15,000	
September 23	Wofford*	Sirrine Stadium; Greenville, SC (rivalry)	W 24–7	11,500	
September 30	at Appalachian State	Conrad Stadium; Boone, NC	W 20–17	8,500	
October 7	at Western Carolina*	Memorial Stadium; Cullowhee, NC	L 15–24	6,635	
October 14	at Davidson	Richardson Stadium; Davidson, NC	L 35–51	6,000	
October 21	Richmond	Sirrine Stadium; Greenville, SC	L 0–37	12,500	
October 28	East Carolina	Sirrine Stadium; Greenville, SC	L 21–27	6,500	
November 4	at VMI	Alumni Memorial Field; Lexington, VA	L 7–31	4,000	
November 11	The Citadel	Sirrine Stadium; Greenville, SC (rivalry)	L 13–19	10,400	
November 18	at Carson–Newman*	Burke–Tarr Stadium; Jefferson City, TN	L 7–57	4,500	
*Non-conference game
