= 1972 Texas A&M Aggies football team =

American college football season

1972 Texas A&M Aggies football
- Conference: Southwest Conference
- Record: 3–8 (2–5 SWC)
- Head coach: Emory Bellard (1st season)
- Offensive coordinator: Ben Hurt (1st season)
- Offensive scheme: Wishbone
- Defensive coordinator: Melvin Robertson (1st season)
- Home stadium: Kyle Field

1972 Southwest Conference football standings
| | Conf. | | | | | Overall |
| Team | W | | L | | T | W | | L | | T |
|---|---|---|---|---|---|---|---|---|---|---|
| No. 3 Texas $ | 7 | – | 0 | – | 0 | 10 | – | 1 | – | 0 |
| Texas Tech | 4 | – | 3 | – | 0 | 8 | – | 4 | – | 0 |
| SMU | 4 | – | 3 | – | 0 | 7 | – | 4 | – | 0 |
| Arkansas | 3 | – | 4 | – | 0 | 6 | – | 5 | – | 0 |
| Rice | 3 | – | 4 | – | 0 | 5 | – | 5 | – | 1 |
| Baylor | 3 | – | 4 | – | 0 | 5 | – | 6 | – | 0 |
| TCU | 2 | – | 5 | – | 0 | 5 | – | 6 | – | 0 |
| Texas A&M | 2 | – | 5 | – | 0 | 3 | – | 8 | – | 0 |
$ – Conference champion; Rankings from AP Poll

The 1972 Texas A&M Aggies football team represented Texas A&M University as a member of the Southwest Conference (SWC) during the 1972 NCAA University Division football season. Led by first-year head coach Emory Bellard, the Aggies compiled an overall record of 3–8 with a mark of 2–5 in conference play, tying for seventh place in the SWC. Texas A&M played home games at Kyle Field in College Station, Texas.

== Schedule ==
| Date | Time | Opponent | Site | Result | Attendance | Source |
|---|---|---|---|---|---|---|
| September 9 | 7:30 p.m. | at Wichita State* | Cessna Stadium; Wichita, KS | W 36–13 | 22,659 | |
| September 16 | | at No. 10 Nebraska* | Memorial Stadium; Lincoln, NE | L 7–37 | 76,042 | |
| September 23 | | at No. 8 LSU* | Tiger Stadium; Baton Rouge, LA (rivalry) | L 17–42 | 68,538 | |
| September 30 | | Army* | Kyle Field; College Station, TX | L 14–24 | 46,680 | |
| October 14 | | Texas Tech | Kyle Field; College Station, TX (rivalry) | L 14–17 | 34,200 | |
| October 21 | | TCU | Kyle Field; College Station, TX (rivalry) | L 10–13 | 28,770 | |
| October 28 | | at Baylor | Baylor Stadium; Waco, TX (rivalry) | L 13–15 | 40,000 | |
| November 4 | | No. 20 Arkansas | Kyle Field; College Station, TX (rivalry) | W 10–7 | 36,723–36,770 | |
| November 11 | | at SMU | Cotton Bowl; Dallas, TX | W 27–17 | 32,109 | |
| November 18 | | Rice | Kyle Field; College Station, TX | L 14–20 | 28,231 | |
| November 23 | | at No. 7 Texas | Memorial Stadium; Austin, TX (rivalry) | L 3–38 | 68,000 | |
*Non-conference game; Rankings from AP Poll released prior to the game; All times are in Central time

== Roster ==
1972 Texas A&M Aggies football team roster
Players
Coaches
Offense

| Pos. | # | Name | Class |
|---|---|---|---|
| RB | 44 | Bubba Bean | Fr |
| QB | 12 | Don Dean | So |

Defense

| Pos. | # | Name | Class |
|---|---|---|---|
| LB | | Ed Simonini | Fr |

Special teams

| Pos. | # | Name | Class |

Head coach

- Emory Bellard

Coordinators/assistant coaches

Legend

- (C) Team captain
- (S) Suspended
- (I) Ineligible
- Injured
- Redshirt
