= 1972 Virginia Cavaliers football team =

American college football season

1972 Virginia Cavaliers football
- Conference: Atlantic Coast Conference
- Record: 4–7 (1–5 ACC)
- Head coach: Don Lawrence (2nd season)
- Captains: Thomas Kennedy; William Williams
- Home stadium: Scott Stadium

1972 Atlantic Coast Conference football standings
	Conf.					Overall
Team	W		L		T	W		L		T
No. 12 North Carolina $	6	–	0	–	0	11	–	1	–	0
No. 17 NC State	4	–	1	–	1	8	–	3	–	1
Maryland	3	–	2	–	1	5	–	5	–	1
Duke	3	–	3	–	0	5	–	6	–	0
Clemson	2	–	4	–	0	4	–	7	–	0
Virginia	1	–	5	–	0	4	–	7	–	0
Wake Forest	1	–	5	–	0	2	–	9	–	0
$ – Conference champion; Rankings from AP Poll

The 1972 Virginia Cavaliers football team represented the University of Virginia during the 1972 NCAA University Division football season. The Cavaliers were led by second-year head coach Don Lawrence and played their home games at Scott Stadium in Charlottesville, Virginia. They competed as members of the Atlantic Coast Conference, finishing tied for last.

== Schedule ==
Date	Opponent	Site	Result	Attendance	Source
September 9	at South Carolina*	Williams–Brice Stadium; Columbia, SC	W 24–16	43,695	
September 16	Virginia Tech*	Scott Stadium; Charlottesville, VA (rivalry)	W 24–20	31,300	
September 23	West Virginia*	Scott Stadium; Charlottesville, VA	L 10–48	27,000	
September 30	at Duke	Wallace Wade Stadium; Durham, NC	L 13–37	20,806	
October 7	at Vanderbilt*	Dudley Field; Nashville, TN	L 7–10	17,903	
October 14	VMI*	Scott Stadium; Charlottesville, VA	W 45–14	19,000	
October 21	at Clemson	Memorial Stadium; Clemson, SC	L 21–37	32,093	
October 28	Maryland^{†}	Scott Stadium; Charlottesville, VA (rivalry)	L 23–24	21,500	
November 4	NC State	Scott Stadium; Charlottesville, VA	L 14–35	17,500	
November 11	at No. 18 North Carolina	Kenan Memorial Stadium; Chapel Hill, NC (South's Oldest Rivalry)	L 3–23	36,500	
November 18	at Wake Forest	Groves Stadium; Winston-Salem, NC	W 15–12	18,000	
*Non-conference game; ^{†}Homecoming; Rankings from AP Poll released prior to the game
