= 1972 Maryland Terrapins football team =

American college football season

1972 Maryland Terrapins football
- Conference: Atlantic Coast Conference
- Record: 5–5–1 (3–2–1 ACC)
- Head coach: Jerry Claiborne (1st season)
- Home stadium: Byrd Stadium

1972 Atlantic Coast Conference football standings
	Conf.					Overall
Team	W		L		T	W		L		T
No. 12 North Carolina $	6	–	0	–	0	11	–	1	–	0
No. 17 NC State	4	–	1	–	1	8	–	3	–	1
Maryland	3	–	2	–	1	5	–	5	–	1
Duke	3	–	3	–	0	5	–	6	–	0
Clemson	2	–	4	–	0	4	–	7	–	0
Virginia	1	–	5	–	0	4	–	7	–	0
Wake Forest	1	–	5	–	0	2	–	9	–	0
$ – Conference champion; Rankings from AP Poll

The 1972 Maryland Terrapins football team represented the University of Maryland in the 1972 NCAA University Division football season. In their first season under head coach Jerry Claiborne, the Terrapins compiled a 5–5–1 record (3–2–1 in conference), finished in third place in the Atlantic Coast Conference, and outscored their opponents 243 to 217. The team's statistical leaders included Bob Avellini with 1,251 passing yards, Louis Carter with 474 rushing yards, and Don Ratliff with 515 receiving yards.

== Schedule ==
Date	Time	Opponent	Site	Result	Attendance	Source
September 9		at NC State	Carter Stadium; Raleigh, NC	T 24–24	31,000	
September 16		North Carolina	Byrd Stadium; College Park, MD	L 26–31	28,000	
September 23		VMI*	Byrd Stadium; College Park, MD	W 28–16	22,000	
September 30		at Syracuse*	Archbold Stadium; Syracuse, NY	L 12–16	15,681	
October 7		Wake Forest	Byrd Stadium; College Park, MD	W 23–0	15,000	
October 14	1:30 p.m.	Villanova*	Byrd Stadium; College Park, MD	W 37–7	26,842	
October 21		at Duke	Wallace Wade Stadium; Durham, NC	L 14–20	21,300	
October 28		at Virginia	Scott Stadium; Charlottesville, VA (rivalry)	W 24–23	21,500	
November 4		at No. 10 Penn State*	Beaver Stadium; University Park, PA (rivalry)	L 16–46	58,171	
November 11		Clemson	Byrd Stadium; College Park, MD	W 31–6	29,326	
November 25		at Miami (FL)*	Miami Orange Bowl; Miami, FL	L 8–28	17,342	
*Non-conference game; Rankings from AP Poll released prior to the game; All times are in Eastern time
