= 1972 NC State Wolfpack football team =

American college football season

1972 NC State Wolfpack football

Peach Bowl champion

Peach Bowl, W 49–13 vs. West Virginia
- Conference: Atlantic Coast Conference

Ranking
- AP: No. 17
- Record: 8–3–1 (4–1–1 ACC)
- Head coach: Lou Holtz (1st season)
- Offensive coordinator: Brian Burke (1st season)
- Home stadium: Carter Stadium

1972 Atlantic Coast Conference football standings
	Conf.					Overall
Team	W		L		T	W		L		T
No. 12 North Carolina $	6	–	0	–	0	11	–	1	–	0
No. 17 NC State	4	–	1	–	1	8	–	3	–	1
Maryland	3	–	2	–	1	5	–	5	–	1
Duke	3	–	3	–	0	5	–	6	–	0
Clemson	2	–	4	–	0	4	–	7	–	0
Virginia	1	–	5	–	0	4	–	7	–	0
Wake Forest	1	–	5	–	0	2	–	9	–	0
$ – Conference champion; Rankings from AP Poll

The 1972 NC State Wolfpack football team represented North Carolina State University during the 1972 NCAA University Division football season. The Wolfpack were led by first-year head coach Lou Holtz and played their home games at Carter Stadium in Raleigh, North Carolina. They competed as members of the Atlantic Coast Conference, finishing in second. NC State was invited to the 1972 Peach Bowl in Atlanta, where they defeated West Virginia.

== Schedule ==
Date	Opponent	Site	Result	Attendance	Source
September 9	Maryland	Carter Stadium; Raleigh, NC	T 24–24	31,000	
September 16	Syracuse*	Carter Stadium; Raleigh, NC	W 43–20	27,100	
September 23	at North Carolina	Kenan Memorial Stadium; Chapel Hill, NC (rivalry)	L 33–34	47,000	
September 30	at Georgia*	Sanford Stadium; Athens, GA	L 22–28	56,613	
October 7	Duke	Carter Stadium; Raleigh, NC (rivalry)	W 17–0	38,200	
October 14	at Wake Forest	Groves Stadium; Winston-Salem, NC (rivalry)	W 42–13	25,000	
October 21	East Carolina*	Carter Stadium; Raleigh, NC (rivalry)	W 38–16	39,300	
October 28	South Carolina*	Carter Stadium; Raleigh, NC	W 42–24	32,200	
November 4	at Virginia	Scott Stadium; Charlottesville, VA	W 35–14	17,500	
November 11	at No. 10 Penn State*	Beaver Stadium; University Park, PA	L 22–37	54,274	
November 18	Clemson	Carter Stadium; Raleigh, NC (rivalry)	W 42–17	31,000	
December 29	vs. No. 18 West Virginia*	Atlanta Stadium; Atlanta, GA (Peach Bowl)	W 49–13	52,671	
*Non-conference game; Rankings from AP Poll released prior to the game
