= 1990 Davidson Wildcats football team =

American college football season

1990 Davidson Wildcats football
- Conference: Independent
- Record: 5–3
- Head coach: Dave Fagg (5th season)
- Home stadium: Richardson Stadium

1990 NCAA Division III independents football records
	Conf.			Overall
Team	W	L	T	W		L		T
Hofstra ^		–		12	–	1	–	0
Dayton ^		–		11	–	1	–	0
Cortland ^		–		9	–	1	–	0
Frostburg State		–		9	–	1	–	0
Union (NY)		–		9	–	1	–	0
Ferrum ^		–		8	–	2	–	0
Ithaca ^		–		8	–	2	–	0
Buffalo State		–		7	–	2	–	0
San Diego		–		7	–	2	–	0
Guilford		–		7	–	3	–	0
Bluffton		–		6	–	3	–	0
Gannon		–		6	–	3	–	0
Davidson		–		5	–	3	–	0
Menlo		–		5	–	3	–	0
Canisius		–		6	–	4	–	0
Drake		–		6	–	4	–	0
Quincy		–		6	–	4	–	0
UC Santa Barbara		–		6	–	4	–	0
Aurora		–		5	–	4	–	0
Catholic University		–		5	–	5	–	0
Georgetown		–		5	–	5	–	0
Maryville (TN)		–		5	–	5	–	0
Wagner		–		5	–	5	–	0
Wesley		–		5	–	5	–	0
Colorado College		–		4	–	5	–	0
Wilmington (OH)		–		4	–	5	–	0
Alfred		–		4	–	6	–	0
Thomas More		–		3	–	6	–	0
Albany		–		3	–	7	–	0
Brockport		–		3	–	7	–	0
Western Connecticut State		–		3	–	7	–	0
Buffalo		–		2	–	8	–	0
Duquesne		–		1	–	8	–	1
Mercyhurst		–		1	–	8	–	0
Norwich		–		1	–	8	–	0
Salisbury State		–		1	–	8	–	0
Southeastern Massachusetts		–		1	–	8	–	0
Saint Peter's		–		0	–	7	–	0
Fairleigh Dickinson–Florham		–		0	–	9	–	0
Kentucky Wesleyan		–		0	–	10	–	0
Methodist		–		0	–	10	–	0
^ – NCAA Division III playoff participant

The 1990 Davidson Wildcats football team represented Davidson College as an independent during the 1990 NCAA Division III football season. Led by fifth-year head coach Dave Fagg, the Wildcats compiled an overall record of 5–3. Davidson defeated Piedmont Baptist College in an exhibition game on November 10 by a final score of 28–7. The game did not count in their final record as Baptist competed as a club sport prior to transitioning to Division III in 1991.

== Schedule ==
Date	Opponent	Site	Result	Attendance	Source
September 1	Sewanee	Richardson Stadium; Davidson, NC	L 9–17	1,535	
September 8	at Millsaps	Harper Davis Field; Jackson, MS	W 24–13	1,500	
September 15	Johnson C. Smith	Richardson Stadium; Davidson, NC	W 17–7	1,800	
September 22	Emory & Henry	Richardson Stadium; Davidson, NC	W 31–27	1,428	
September 29	at Dickinson	Biddle Field; Carlisle, PA	L 16–38	2,500	
October 13	Methodist^{†}	Richardson Stadium; Davidson, NC	W 49–7	2,048	
October 27	Guilford	Richardson Stadium; Davidson, NC	W 20–17	3,107–3,108	
November 3	at Rhodes	Fargason Field; Memphis, TN	L 13–23	2,054	
^{†}Homecoming
