= 1972 TCU Horned Frogs football team =

American college football season

1972 TCU Horned Frogs football
- Conference: Southwest Conference
- Record: 5–6 (2–5 SWC)
- Head coach: Billy Tohill (2nd season)
- Offensive coordinator: Russell Coffee (2nd season)
- Offensive scheme: Spread
- Base defense: 5–2
- Home stadium: Amon G. Carter Stadium

1972 Southwest Conference football standings
| | Conf. | | | | | Overall |
| Team | W | | L | | T | W | | L | | T |
|---|---|---|---|---|---|---|---|---|---|---|
| No. 3 Texas $ | 7 | – | 0 | – | 0 | 10 | – | 1 | – | 0 |
| Texas Tech | 4 | – | 3 | – | 0 | 8 | – | 4 | – | 0 |
| SMU | 4 | – | 3 | – | 0 | 7 | – | 4 | – | 0 |
| Arkansas | 3 | – | 4 | – | 0 | 6 | – | 5 | – | 0 |
| Rice | 3 | – | 4 | – | 0 | 5 | – | 5 | – | 1 |
| Baylor | 3 | – | 4 | – | 0 | 5 | – | 6 | – | 0 |
| TCU | 2 | – | 5 | – | 0 | 5 | – | 6 | – | 0 |
| Texas A&M | 2 | – | 5 | – | 0 | 3 | – | 8 | – | 0 |
$ – Conference champion; Rankings from AP Poll

The 1972 TCU Horned Frogs football team represented Texas Christian University (TCU) in the 1972 NCAA University Division football season. The Horned Frogs finished the season 5–6 overall and 2–5 in the Southwest Conference. The team was coached by Billy Tohill, in his second year as head coach. The Frogs played their home games in Amon G. Carter Stadium, which is located on campus in Fort Worth, Texas.

== Schedule ==
| Date | Time | Opponent | Site | Result | Attendance | Source |
|---|---|---|---|---|---|---|
| September 23 | | at Indiana* | Memorial Stadium; Bloomington, IN | W 31–28 | 34,004 | |
| September 30 | 7:30 p.m. | UT Arlington* | Amon G. Carter Stadium; Fort Worth, TX | W 38–14 | 22,300 | |
| October 7 | | Arkansas | Amon G. Carter Stadium; Fort Worth, TX | L 13–27 | 42,558 | |
| October 14 | | at Tulsa* | Skelly Field; Tulsa, OK | W 21–0 | 18,500 | |
| October 21 | | at Texas A&M | Kyle Field; College Station, TX (rivalry) | W 13–10 | 28,770 | |
| October 28 | 1:30 pm | at No. 13 Notre Dame* | Notre Dame Stadium; South Bend, IN | L 0–21 | 59,075 | |
| November 4 | | Baylor | Amon G. Carter Stadium; Fort Worth, TX (rivalry) | L 9–42 | 22,925 | |
| November 11 | | at No. 15 Texas Tech | Jones Stadium; Lubbock, TX (rivalry) | W 31–7 | 40,120 | |
| November 18 | 2:00 p.m. | No. 7 Texas | Amon G. Carter Stadium; Fort Worth, TX (rivalry) | L 0–27 | 33,536 | |
| November 25 | | at Rice | Rice Stadium; Houston, TX | L 21–25 | 15,000 | |
| December 2 | | SMU | Amon G. Carter Stadium; Fort Worth, TX (rivalry) | L 22–35 | 18,152 | |
*Non-conference game; Rankings from AP Poll released prior to the game; All times are in Central time

== Roster ==
1972 TCU Horned Frogs football team roster
Players
Coaches
Offense

| Pos. | # | Name | Class |
|---|---|---|---|
| QB | 11 | Kent Marshall | Jr |
| G | 76 | Guy Morriss | Sr |

Defense

| Pos. | # | Name | Class |
|---|---|---|---|
| DB | 25 | Lyle Blackwood | Sr |
| DT | 71 | Charles Davis | Jr |
| DB | 27 | Dave McGinnis | Sr |

Special teams

| Pos. | # | Name | Class |

Head coach

- Billy Tohill

Coordinators/assistant coaches

Legend

- (C) Team captain
- (S) Suspended
- (I) Ineligible
- Injured
- Redshirt
