= 1972 Rice Owls football team =

American college football season

1972 Rice Owls football
- Conference: Southwest Conference
- Record: 5–5–1 (3–4 SWC)
- Head coach: Al Conover (1st season)
- Home stadium: Rice Stadium

1972 Southwest Conference football standings
	Conf.					Overall
Team	W		L		T	W		L		T
No. 3 Texas $	7	–	0	–	0	10	–	1	–	0
Texas Tech	4	–	3	–	0	8	–	4	–	0
SMU	4	–	3	–	0	7	–	4	–	0
Arkansas	3	–	4	–	0	6	–	5	–	0
Rice	3	–	4	–	0	5	–	5	–	1
Baylor	3	–	4	–	0	5	–	6	–	0
TCU	2	–	5	–	0	5	–	6	–	0
Texas A&M	2	–	5	–	0	3	–	8	–	0
$ – Conference champion; Rankings from AP Poll

The 1972 Rice Owls football team was an American football team that represented Rice University in the Southwest Conference during the 1972 NCAA University Division football season. In their first year under head coach Al Conover, the team compiled a 5–5–1 record.

== Schedule ==
Date	Opponent	Site	Result	Attendance	Source
September 9	Houston*	Rice Stadium; Houston, TX	W 14–13	51,000	
September 23	Clemson*	Rice Stadium; Houston, TX	W 29–10	19,500	
September 30	at Georgia Tech*	Grant Field; Atlanta, GA	T 36–36	41,179	
October 7	No. 8 LSU*	Rice Stadium; Houston, TX	L 6–12	60,000	
October 21	at SMU	Cotton Bowl; Dallas, TX	L 14–29	20,398	
October 28	No. 10 Texas	Rice Stadium; Houston, TX	L 9–45	65,000	
November 4	No. 18 Texas Tech	Rice Stadium; Houston, TX	L 6–10	20,000	
November 11	at Arkansas	War Memorial Stadium; Little Rock, AR	W 23–20	51,475	
November 18	at Texas A&M	Kyle Field; College Station, TX	W 20–14	28,231	
November 25	No. 18 TCU	Rice Stadium; Houston, TX	W 25–21	15,000	
December 2	at Baylor	Baylor Stadium; Waco, TX	L 14–28	26,000	
*Non-conference game; Rankings from AP Poll released prior to the game
