= 1972 VMI Keydets football team =

American college football season

1972 VMI Keydets football
- Conference: Southern Conference
- Record: 2–9 (1–5 SoCon)
- Head coach: Bob Thalman (2nd season)
- Home stadium: Alumni Memorial Field

1972 Southern Conference football standings
	Conf.					Overall
Team	W		L		T	W		L		T
East Carolina $	6	–	0	–	0	9	–	2	–	0
Richmond	5	–	1	–	0	6	–	4	–	0
William & Mary	4	–	2	–	0	5	–	6	–	0
The Citadel	4	–	3	–	0	5	–	6	–	0
Davidson	2	–	3	–	1	3	–	7	–	1
VMI	1	–	5	–	0	2	–	9	–	0
Furman	1	–	6	–	0	2	–	9	–	0
Appalachian State	0	–	3	–	1	5	–	5	–	1
$ – Conference champion

The 1972 VMI Keydets football team was an American football team that represented the Virginia Military Institute (VMI) as a member of the Southern Conference (SoCon) during the 1972 NCAA University Division football season. In their second year under head coach Bob Thalman, the team compiled an overall record of 2–9 with a mark of 1–5 in conference play, placing sixth in the SoCon.

== Schedule ==
Date	Opponent	Site	Result	Attendance	Source
September 9	East Carolina	Alumni Memorial Field; Lexington, VA	L 3–30	4,600	
September 16	Davidson	Alumni Memorial Field; Lexington, VA	L 14–18	4,200	
September 23	at Maryland*	Byrd Stadium; College Park, MD	L 16–28	22,000	
September 30	at Richmond	City Stadium; Richmond, VA (rivalry)	L 15–34		
October 7	at The Citadel	Johnson Hagood Stadium; Charleston, SC (rivalry)	L 3–42	11,682	
October 14	at Virginia*	Scott Stadium; Charlottesville, VA	L 14–45	19,000	
October 21	William & Mary	Alumni Memorial Field; Lexington, VA (rivalry)	L 3–31	6,000	
October 28	at Dayton*	Baujan Field; Dayton, OH	L 10–14	7,247	
November 4	Furman	Alumni Memorial Field; Lexington, VA	W 31–7	4,000	
November 11	at West Virginia*	Mountaineer Field; Morgantown, WV	L 24–50	21,000	
November 18	at Chattanooga*	Chamberlain Field; Chattanooga, TN	W 17–0	1,500	
*Non-conference game
