= 1972 Wake Forest Demon Deacons football team =

American college football season

1972 Wake Forest Demon Deacons football
- Conference: Atlantic Coast Conference
- Record: 2–9 (1–5 ACC)
- Head coach: Tom Harper (1st season)
- Captains: Bruce Reinert; Donnie Brown
- Home stadium: Groves Stadium

1972 Atlantic Coast Conference football standings
	Conf.					Overall
Team	W		L		T	W		L		T
No. 12 North Carolina $	6	–	0	–	0	11	–	1	–	0
No. 17 NC State	4	–	1	–	1	8	–	3	–	1
Maryland	3	–	2	–	1	5	–	5	–	1
Duke	3	–	3	–	0	5	–	6	–	0
Clemson	2	–	4	–	0	4	–	7	–	0
Virginia	1	–	5	–	0	4	–	7	–	0
Wake Forest	1	–	5	–	0	2	–	9	–	0
$ – Conference champion; Rankings from AP Poll

The 1972 Wake Forest Demon Deacons football team was an American football team that represented Wake Forest University during the 1972 NCAA University Division football season. In their first and only season under head coach Tom Harper, the Demon Deacons compiled a 2–9 record and finished in a tie for last place in the Atlantic Coast Conference.

== Schedule ==
Date	Opponent	Site	Result	Attendance	Source
September 9	Davidson*	Groves Stadium; Winston-Salem, NC	W 26–20	17,000	
September 16	at SMU*	Texas Stadium; Irving, TX	L 10–56	20,175	
September 23	at No. 5 Tennessee*	Neyland Stadium; Knoxville, TN	L 6–45	66,266	
October 7	at Maryland	Byrd Stadium; College Park, MD	L 0–23	15,000	
October 14	NC State	Groves Stadium; Winston-Salem, NC (rivalry)	L 13–42	25,000	
October 21	North Carolina	Groves Stadium; Winston-Salem, NC (rivalry)	L 0–21	27,000	
October 28	Clemson	Groves Stadium; Winston-Salem, NC	L 0–31	16,000	
November 4	at South Carolina*	Williams–Brice Stadium; Columbia, SC	L 3–35	38,689	
November 11	at Duke	Wallace Wade Stadium; Durham, NC (rivalry)	W 9–7	18,025	
November 18	Virginia	Groves Stadium; Winston-Salem, NC	L 12–15	18,000	
November 25	Virginia Tech*	Groves Stadium; Winston-Salem, NC	L 9–44	6,500	
*Non-conference game; Rankings from AP Poll released prior to the game

== Roster ==
1972 Wake Forest Demon Deacons football team roster
Players
Coaches
Offense

Pos.	#	Name	Class
TE	22	Kevin Byrnes	Jr
RB	46	Edward Campbell	Jr
QB	9	Andy Carlton	Fr
RB	1	Ron DeBenedetti	Jr
RB	40	Ken Garrett	Sr
C	54	Vince Greco	Jr
OT	68	Randy Halsall	Jr
FB	44	Frank Harsh	Fr
RB	30	Clayton Heath	Jr
G	67	Stuart Hughes	Jr
G	66	Ron Lennon	Jr
WR	20	Carl Lowe	Sr
WR	7	Jim McMahen	Sr
TE	81	Nick Ortega	Jr
QB	15	Chuck Ramsey	Jr
OT	70	Bruce Reinert	Sr
QB	10	Jim Ryan	Jr

Defense

Pos.	#	Name	Class
LB	23	Nick Arcaro	Jr
DT	74	David Bailey	So
LB	52	Donnie Brown	Sr
S	36	Richard Carter	Jr
DT	75	Neville Davis	Jr
CB	3	Felix Glasco	Jr
DE	95	Rich Gregory	So
DL	92	John Hardin	Jr
CB	5	James Hargrove	So
DT	72	Steve Komondorea	Sr
LB	73	Tony Mangiaracino	Sr
LB	59	David Mebs	So
S	11	Junior Moore	Sr
S	43	Sammy Rothrock	Sr
S	21	Rich Sievers	Jr

Special teams

Pos.	#	Name	Class

Head coach

- Tom Harper

Coordinators/assistant coaches

Legend

- (C) Team captain
- (S) Suspended
- (I) Ineligible
- Injured
- Redshirt

== Team leaders ==
Category	Team Leader	Att/Cth	Yds
Passing	Andy Carlton	24/70	268
Rushing	Frank Harsh	157	663
Receiving	Gary Johnson	9	135
