= 1990 Buffalo Bulls football team =

American college football season

1990 Buffalo Bulls football
- Conference: Independent
- Record: 2–8
- Head coach: Sam Sanders (1st season)
- Defensive coordinator: Mike Donnelly (1st season)
- Captains: John Hartman; Dave Short; Frank Reilly
- Home stadium: Rotary Field

1990 NCAA Division III independents football records
	Conf.			Overall
Team	W	L	T	W		L		T
Hofstra ^		–		12	–	1	–	0
Dayton ^		–		11	–	1	–	0
Cortland ^		–		9	–	1	–	0
Frostburg State		–		9	–	1	–	0
Union (NY)		–		9	–	1	–	0
Ferrum ^		–		8	–	2	–	0
Ithaca ^		–		8	–	2	–	0
Buffalo State		–		7	–	2	–	0
San Diego		–		7	–	2	–	0
Guilford		–		7	–	3	–	0
Bluffton		–		6	–	3	–	0
Gannon		–		6	–	3	–	0
Davidson		–		5	–	3	–	0
Menlo		–		5	–	3	–	0
Canisius		–		6	–	4	–	0
Drake		–		6	–	4	–	0
Quincy		–		6	–	4	–	0
UC Santa Barbara		–		6	–	4	–	0
Aurora		–		5	–	4	–	0
Catholic University		–		5	–	5	–	0
Georgetown		–		5	–	5	–	0
Maryville (TN)		–		5	–	5	–	0
Wagner		–		5	–	5	–	0
Wesley		–		5	–	5	–	0
Colorado College		–		4	–	5	–	0
Wilmington (OH)		–		4	–	5	–	0
Alfred		–		4	–	6	–	0
Thomas More		–		3	–	6	–	0
Albany		–		3	–	7	–	0
Brockport		–		3	–	7	–	0
Western Connecticut State		–		3	–	7	–	0
Buffalo		–		2	–	8	–	0
Duquesne		–		1	–	8	–	1
Mercyhurst		–		1	–	8	–	0
Norwich		–		1	–	8	–	0
Salisbury State		–		1	–	8	–	0
Southeastern Massachusetts		–		1	–	8	–	0
Saint Peter's		–		0	–	7	–	0
Fairleigh Dickinson–Florham		–		0	–	9	–	0
Kentucky Wesleyan		–		0	–	10	–	0
Methodist		–		0	–	10	–	0
^ – NCAA Division III playoff participant

The 1990 Buffalo Bulls football team represented the University at Buffalo as an independent during the 1990 NCAA Division III football season. Led by Sam Sanders in his first season as head coach, the team compiled a record of 2–8.

== Schedule ==
Date	Opponent	Site	Result	Attendance
September 1	Central Connecticut State	Rotary Field; Buffalo, NY	L 25–36	4,812
September 8	at Montclair State	Upper Montclair, NJ	L 0–21	4,424
September 22	Westminster (PA)	Rotary Field; Buffalo, NY	L 12–38	2,316
September 29	at Hofstra	Hofstra Stadium; Hempstead, NY	L 0–44	2,689
October 6	Canisius	Rotary Field; Buffalo, NY	L 29–30	1,042
October 13	Ithaca	Rotary Field; Buffalo, NY	L 21–42	4,378
October 20	Brockport	Rotary Field; Buffalo, NY	W 35–27	1,678
October 27	at Mercyhurst	Erie, PA	W 44–29	200
November 3	Southern Connecticut State	Rotary Field; Buffalo, NY	L 6–14	1,124
November 10	East Stroudsburg	Rotary Field; Buffalo, NY	L 16–49	986
