= 1972 The Citadel Bulldogs football team =

American college football season

1972 The Citadel Bulldogs football
- Conference: Southern Conference
- Record: 5–6 (4–3 SoCon)
- Head coach: Red Parker (7th season)
- Home stadium: Johnson Hagood Stadium

1972 Southern Conference football standings
	Conf.					Overall
Team	W		L		T	W		L		T
East Carolina $	6	–	0	–	0	9	–	2	–	0
Richmond	5	–	1	–	0	6	–	4	–	0
William & Mary	4	–	2	–	0	5	–	6	–	0
The Citadel	4	–	3	–	0	5	–	6	–	0
Davidson	2	–	3	–	1	3	–	7	–	1
VMI	1	–	5	–	0	2	–	9	–	0
Furman	1	–	6	–	0	2	–	9	–	0
Appalachian State	0	–	3	–	1	5	–	5	–	1
$ – Conference champion

The 1972 The Citadel Bulldogs football team represented The Citadel, The Military College of South Carolina in the 1972 NCAA University Division football season. Red Parker served as head coach for the seventh season. The Bulldogs played as members of the Southern Conference and played home games at Johnson Hagood Stadium.

== Schedule ==
Date	Opponent	Site	Result	Attendance	Source
September 9	at Clemson*	Memorial Stadium; Clemson, SC	L 0–13	37,934	
September 16	at Appalachian State	Conrad Stadium; Boone, NC	W 28–21	8,000	
September 23	Western Carolina*	Johnson Hagood Stadium; Charleston, SC	L 0–10	15,700	
September 30	at William & Mary	Cary Field; Williamsburg, VA	L 12–31	7,500	
October 7	VMI	Johnson Hagood Stadium; Charleston, SC (rivalry)	W 42–3	11,682	
October 14	at East Carolina	Ficklen Stadium; Greenville, NC	L 21–27	15,320	
October 21	at Chattanooga*	Chamberlain Field; Chattanooga, TN	W 12–0	5,000	
October 28	Colgate*	Johnson Hagood Stadium; Charleston, SC	L 26–28	15,290	
November 4	Richmond	Johnson Hagood Stadium; Charleston, SC	L 7–21	11,680	
November 11	at Furman	Sirrine Stadium; Greenville, SC (rivalry)	W 19–13	10,400	
November 18	Davidson^{†}	Johnson Hagood Stadium; Charleston, SC	W 25–16	11,935	
*Non-conference game; ^{†}Homecoming
