= 1972 Arkansas Razorbacks football team =

American college football season

1972 Arkansas Razorbacks football
- Conference: Southwest Conference
- Record: 6–5 (3–4 SWC)
- Head coach: Frank Broyles (15th season)
- Captains: Louis Campbell; Jim Hodge; Tom Reed; Don Wunderly
- Home stadium: Razorback Stadium; War Memorial Stadium

1972 Southwest Conference football standings
	Conf.					Overall
Team	W		L		T	W		L		T
No. 3 Texas $	7	–	0	–	0	10	–	1	–	0
Texas Tech	4	–	3	–	0	8	–	4	–	0
SMU	4	–	3	–	0	7	–	4	–	0
Arkansas	3	–	4	–	0	6	–	5	–	0
Rice	3	–	4	–	0	5	–	5	–	1
Baylor	3	–	4	–	0	5	–	6	–	0
TCU	2	–	5	–	0	5	–	6	–	0
Texas A&M	2	–	5	–	0	3	–	8	–	0
$ – Conference champion; Rankings from AP Poll

The 1972 Arkansas Razorbacks football team represented the University of Arkansas in the Southwest Conference (SWC) during the 1972 NCAA University Division football season. In their 15th year under head coach Frank Broyles, the Razorbacks compiled a 6–5 record (3–4 against SWC opponents), finished in a tie for fourth place in the SWC, and outscored all opponents by a combined total of 228 to 227.

== Schedule ==
Date	Time	Opponent	Rank	Site	TV	Result	Attendance	Source
September 9		No. 8 USC*	No. 4	War Memorial Stadium; Little Rock, AR		L 10–31	54,461	
September 23		Oklahoma State*		War Memorial Stadium; Little Rock, AR		W 24–23	54,431	
September 30		Tulsa*		Razorback Stadium; Fayetteville, AR		W 21–20	40,003	
October 7		at TCU		Amon G. Carter Stadium; Fort Worth, TX		W 27–13	42,558	
October 14		Baylor	No. 20	Razorback Stadium; Fayetteville, AR		W 31–20	41,670	
October 21		at No. 15 Texas	No. 17	Memorial Stadium; Austin, TX (rivalry)	ABC	L 15–35	80,844	
October 28	7:30 p.m.	North Texas State*	No. T–18	War Memorial Stadium; Little Rock, AR		W 42–16	48,735	
November 4		at Texas A&M	No. 20	Kyle Field; College Station, TX (rivalry)		L 7–10	36,723–36,770	
November 11		Rice		War Memorial Stadium; Little Rock, AR		L 20–23	51,475	
November 18		SMU		Razorback Stadium; Fayetteville, AR		L 7–22	38,342	
November 25		at Texas Tech		Jones Stadium; Lubbock, TX (rivalry)		W 24–14	35,275	
*Non-conference game; Rankings from AP Poll released prior to the game; All times are in Central time

== Roster ==
- QB Joe Ferguson, Sr.
- Tom Reed, OL Sr., Team Captain
