= 1972 William & Mary Indians football team =

American college football season

1972 William & Mary Indians football
- Conference: Southern Conference
- Record: 5–6 (4–2 SoCon)
- Head coach: Jim Root (1st season)
- Offensive coordinator: Paul Schudel (1st season)
- Defensive coordinator: Lou Tepper (1st season)
- Captains: Paul Scolaro; Todd Bushnell
- Home stadium: Cary Field

1972 Southern Conference football standings
	Conf.					Overall
Team	W		L		T	W		L		T
East Carolina $	6	–	0	–	0	9	–	2	–	0
Richmond	5	–	1	–	0	6	–	4	–	0
William & Mary	4	–	2	–	0	5	–	6	–	0
The Citadel	4	–	3	–	0	5	–	6	–	0
Davidson	2	–	3	–	1	3	–	7	–	1
VMI	1	–	5	–	0	2	–	9	–	0
Furman	1	–	6	–	0	2	–	9	–	0
Appalachian State	0	–	3	–	1	5	–	5	–	1
$ – Conference champion

The 1972 William & Mary Indians football team represented the College of William & Mary as a member of the Southern Conference (SoCon) during the 1972 NCAA University Division football season. Led by Jim Root in his first year as head coach, William & Mary finished the season 5–6 overall and 4–2 in SoCon play to place third.

== Schedule ==
Date	Time	Opponent	Site	Result	Attendance	Source
September 9		Furman	Cary Field; Williamsburg, VA	W 31–7		
September 16		at Navy*	Navy–Marine Corps Memorial Stadium; Annapolis, MD	L 9–13	16,196	
September 23	1:32 p.m.	at Villanova*	Villanova Stadium; Villanova, PA	L 17–20	9,150	
September 30		The Citadel	Cary Field; Williamsburg, VA	W 31–12	7,500	
October 7		at West Virginia*	Mountaineer Field; Morgantown, WV	L 34–49	28,000	
October 14		Vanderbilt*	Cary Field; Williamsburg, VA	L 17–21	13,000	
October 21		at VMI	Alumni Memorial Field; Lexington, VA (rivalry)	W 31–3	6,000	
October 28		vs. Virginia Tech*	City Stadium; Richmond, VA (Tobacco Bowl)	W 17–16	22,000	
November 4		at Davidson	Richardson Stadium; Davidson, NC	W 56–9	3,000	
November 11		East Carolina	Cary Field; Williamsburg, VA	L 15–21	15,000	
November 18		at Richmond	City Stadium; Richmond, VA (rivalry)	L 3–20	11,500	
*Non-conference game; All times are in Eastern time
