= 1972 Davidson Wildcats football team =

American college football season

1972 Davidson Wildcats football
- Conference: Southern Conference
- Record: 3–7–1 (2–3–1 SoCon)
- Head coach: Dave Fagg (3rd season)
- Home stadium: Richardson Stadium

1972 Southern Conference football standings
	Conf.					Overall
Team	W		L		T	W		L		T
East Carolina $	6	–	0	–	0	9	–	2	–	0
Richmond	5	–	1	–	0	6	–	4	–	0
William & Mary	4	–	2	–	0	5	–	6	–	0
The Citadel	4	–	3	–	0	5	–	6	–	0
Davidson	2	–	3	–	1	3	–	7	–	1
VMI	1	–	5	–	0	2	–	9	–	0
Furman	1	–	6	–	0	2	–	9	–	0
Appalachian State	0	–	3	–	1	5	–	5	–	1
$ – Conference champion

The 1972 Davidson Wildcats football team represented Davidson College as a member of the Southern Conference (SoCon) during the 1972 NCAA University Division football season. Led by third-year head coach Dave Fagg, the Wildcats compiled an overall record of 3–7–1 with a mark of 2–3–1 in conference play, placing fifth in the SoCon.

== Schedule ==
Date	Time	Opponent	Site	Result	Attendance	Source
September 9		at Wake Forest*	Groves Stadium; Winston-Salem, NC	L 20–26	17,000	
September 16		at VMI	Alumni Memorial Field; Lexington, VA	W 18–14	4,200	
September 23		at Lenoir–Rhyne*	Moretz Stadium; Hickory, NC	L 16–41	9,500	
September 30	3:31 p.m.	at Air Force*	Falcon Stadium; Colorado Springs, CO	L 6–68	33,601	
October 7		vs. Appalachian State	American Legion Memorial Stadium; Charlotte, NC	T 10–10	4,000	
October 14		Furman	Richardson Stadium; Davidson, NC	W 51–35	6,000	
October 21		at Wofford*	Snyder Field; Spartanburg, SC	L 17–27		
October 28		Bucknell*^{†}	Richardson Stadium; Davidson, NC	W 25–21	3,500–4,000	
November 4		William & Mary	Richardson Stadium; Davidson, NC	L 9–56	3,000	
November 11		at Richmond	City Stadium; Richmond, VA	L 14–27	8,650	
November 18		at The Citadel	Johnson Hagood Stadium; Charleston, SC	L 16–25	11,935	
*Non-conference game; ^{†}Homecoming; All times are in Eastern time
