= 1972 SMU Mustangs football team =

American college football season

1972 SMU Mustangs football
- Conference: Southwest Conference
- Record: 7–4 (4–3 SWC)
- Head coach: Hayden Fry (11th season)
- Home stadium: Cotton Bowl; Texas Stadium

1972 Southwest Conference football standings
	Conf.					Overall
Team	W		L		T	W		L		T
No. 3 Texas $	7	–	0	–	0	10	–	1	–	0
Texas Tech	4	–	3	–	0	8	–	4	–	0
SMU	4	–	3	–	0	7	–	4	–	0
Arkansas	3	–	4	–	0	6	–	5	–	0
Rice	3	–	4	–	0	5	–	5	–	1
Baylor	3	–	4	–	0	5	–	6	–	0
TCU	2	–	5	–	0	5	–	6	–	0
Texas A&M	2	–	5	–	0	3	–	8	–	0
$ – Conference champion; Rankings from AP Poll

The 1972 SMU Mustangs football team represented Southern Methodist University (SMU) as a member of the Southwest Conference (SWC) during the 1972 NCAA University Division football season. Led by Hayden Fry in his 11th and final season as head coach, the Mustangs compiled an overall record of 7–4 with a conference mark of 4–3, tying for second place in the SWC.

== Schedule ==
Date	Opponent	Rank	Site	Result	Attendance	Source
September 16	Wake Forest*		Texas Stadium; Irving, TX	W 56–10	20,175	
September 23	at Florida*		Tampa Stadium; Tampa, FL	W 21–14	42,849	
September 30	at Virginia Tech*		Lane Stadium; Blacksburg, VA	L 10–13	26,000	
October 7	New Mexico State*		Texas Stadium; Irving, TX	W 55–6	27,221	
October 21	Rice		Cotton Bowl; Dallas, TX (rivalry)	W 29–14	20,398	
October 28	Texas Tech	No. T–18	Cotton Bowl; Dallas, TX	L 3–17	35,953	
November 4	at No. 9 Texas		Memorial Stadium; Austin, TX	L 9–17	72,500	
November 11	Texas A&M		Cotton Bowl; Dallas, TX	L 17–27	32,109	
November 18	at Arkansas		Razorback Stadium; Fayetteville, AR	W 22–7	38,342	
November 25	Baylor		Cotton Bowl; Dallas, TX	W 12–7	18,035	
December 2	at TCU		Amon G. Carter Stadium; Fort Worth, TX (rivalry)	W 35–22	18,152	
*Non-conference game; Rankings from AP Poll released prior to the game

== Roster ==
1972 SMU Mustangs football team roster
Players
Coaches
Offense

Pos.	#	Name	Class
RB	28	Alvin Maxson	Jr
OT	73	John Meyer	Sr

Defense

Pos.	#	Name	Class
DB	24	Pat Curry	Sr
DB	43	Robert Popelka	Sr

Special teams

Pos.	#	Name	Class

Head coach

- Hayden Fry

Coordinators/assistant coaches

- Bum Phillips (DC)

Legend

- (C) Team captain
- (S) Suspended
- (I) Ineligible
- Injured
- Redshirt
