= 1972 East Carolina Pirates football team =

American college football season

1972 East Carolina Pirates football

SoCon champion
- Conference: Southern Conference
- Record: 9–2 (6–0 SoCon)
- Head coach: Sonny Randle (2nd season)
- Offensive coordinator: Vito Ragazzo (2nd season)
- Home stadium: Ficklen Memorial Stadium

1972 Southern Conference football standings
	Conf.					Overall
Team	W		L		T	W		L		T
East Carolina $	6	–	0	–	0	9	–	2	–	0
Richmond	5	–	1	–	0	6	–	4	–	0
William & Mary	4	–	2	–	0	5	–	6	–	0
The Citadel	4	–	3	–	0	5	–	6	–	0
Davidson	2	–	3	–	1	3	–	7	–	1
VMI	1	–	5	–	0	2	–	9	–	0
Furman	1	–	6	–	0	2	–	9	–	0
Appalachian State	0	–	3	–	1	5	–	5	–	1
$ – Conference champion

The 1972 East Carolina Pirates football team was an American football team that represented East Carolina University as a member of the Southern Conference during the 1972 NCAA University Division football season. In their second season under head coach Sonny Randle, the team compiled a 9–2 record.

== Schedule ==
Date	Opponent	Site	Result	Attendance	Source
September 9	at VMI	Alumni Memorial Field; Lexington, VA	W 30–3	4,600	
September 16	Southern Illinois*	Ficklen Memorial Stadium; Greenville, NC	W 16–0	16,509	
September 23	Appalachian State	Ficklen Memorial Stadium; Greenville, NC	W 35–7	16,410	
October 7	at Richmond	City Stadium; Richmond, VA	W 21–0	7,500	
October 14	The Citadel	Ficklen Memorial Stadium; Greenville, NC	W 27–21	15,320	
October 21	at NC State*	Carter Stadium; Raleigh, NC (rivalry)	L 16–38	39,300	
October 28	at Furman	Sirrine Stadium; Greenville, SC	W 27–21	6,500	
November 4	Chattanooga*	Ficklen Memorial Stadium; Greenville, NC	W 33–7	17,786	
November 11	at William & Mary	Cary Field; Williamsburg, VA	W 21–15	15,000	
November 18	Dayton*	Ficklen Memorial Stadium; Greenville, NC	W 24–22	10,200	
November 25	at No. 15 North Carolina*	Kenan Memorial Stadium; Chapel Hill, NC	L 19–42	31,600	
*Non-conference game; Rankings from AP Poll released prior to the game
