= 1972 Duke Blue Devils football team =

American college football season

1972 Duke Blue Devils football
- Conference: Atlantic Coast Conference
- Record: 5–6 (3–3 ACC)
- Head coach: Mike McGee (2nd season)
- Defensive coordinator: Jerry McGee (1st season)
- MVP: Steve Jones
- Captains: Dale Grimes; Bill Hanenberg; Steve Jones
- Home stadium: Wallace Wade Stadium

1972 Atlantic Coast Conference football standings
| | Conf. | | | | | Overall |
| Team | W | | L | | T | W | | L | | T |
|---|---|---|---|---|---|---|---|---|---|---|
| No. 12 North Carolina $ | 6 | – | 0 | – | 0 | 11 | – | 1 | – | 0 |
| No. 17 NC State | 4 | – | 1 | – | 1 | 8 | – | 3 | – | 1 |
| Maryland | 3 | – | 2 | – | 1 | 5 | – | 5 | – | 1 |
| Duke | 3 | – | 3 | – | 0 | 5 | – | 6 | – | 0 |
| Clemson | 2 | – | 4 | – | 0 | 4 | – | 7 | – | 0 |
| Virginia | 1 | – | 5 | – | 0 | 4 | – | 7 | – | 0 |
| Wake Forest | 1 | – | 5 | – | 0 | 2 | – | 9 | – | 0 |
$ – Conference champion; Rankings from AP Poll

The 1972 Duke Blue Devils football team was an American football team that represented Duke University as a member of the Atlantic Coast Conference (ACC) during the 1972 NCAA University Division football season. In their second year under head coach Mike McGee, the Blue Devils compiled an overall record of 5–6, with a conference record of 3–3, and finished fourth in the ACC.

== Schedule ==
| Date | Opponent | Site | Result | Attendance | Source |
|---|---|---|---|---|---|
| September 9 | at No. 7 Alabama* | Legion Field; Birmingham, AL | L 12–35 | 71,281 | |
| September 16 | at No. 12 Washington* | Husky Stadium; Seattle, WA | L 6–14 | 59,200 | |
| September 23 | No. 19 Stanford* | Wallace Wade Stadium; Durham, NC | L 6–10 | 24,600 | |
| September 30 | Virginia | Wallace Wade Stadium; Durham, NC | W 37–13 | 20,806 | |
| October 7 | at NC State | Carter Stadium; Raleigh, NC (rivalry) | L 0–17 | 38,200 | |
| October 14 | at Clemson | Memorial Stadium; Clemson, SC | W 7–0 | 32,586 | |
| October 21 | Maryland^{†} | Wallace Wade Stadium; Durham, NC | W 20–14 | 21,300 | |
| October 28 | vs. Navy* | Foreman Field; Norfolk, VA (Oyster Bowl) | W 17–16 | 26,000 | |
| November 4 | Georgia Tech* | Wallace Wade Stadium; Durham, NC | W 20–14 | 37,300 | |
| November 11 | Wake Forest | Wallace Wade Stadium; Durham, NC (rivalry) | L 7–9 | 18,025 | |
| November 18 | at No. 16 North Carolina | Kenan Stadium; Chapel Hill, NC (Victory Bell) | L 0–14 | 47,000 | |
*Non-conference game; ^{†}Homecoming; Rankings from AP Poll released prior to the game

== Roster ==
1972 Duke Blue Devils football team roster
Players
Coaches
Offense

| Pos. | # | Name | Class |
|---|---|---|---|
| QB | 3 | Bob Albright | Jr |
| OT | 73 | Ben Baier | Jr |
| WR | 18 | Tom Chambers | Sr |
| G | 77 | Willie Clayton | Sr |
| TE | 88 | Gene Devine | So |
| RB | 46 | Steve Jones | Sr |
| OT | 64 | Ed Newman | Sr |

Defense

| Pos. | # | Name | Class |
|---|---|---|---|
| DB | 14 | Buck Bowers | So |
| DE | 98 | Jeff Burleson |
| DE | 80 | Randy Chambers | Sr |
| LB | 38 | Jack Childress | Sr |
| DE | 87 | Ernest Clark | So |
| DB | 24 | Butler Cox | Jr |

Special teams

| Pos. | # | Name | Class |

Head coach

- Mike McGee

Coordinators/assistant coaches

- John Gutekunst
  (Defensive ends coach)

Legend

- (C) Team captain
- (S) Suspended
- (I) Ineligible
- Injured
- Redshirt
