= 1972 Peach Bowl =

American college football game

- 5th Peach Bowl
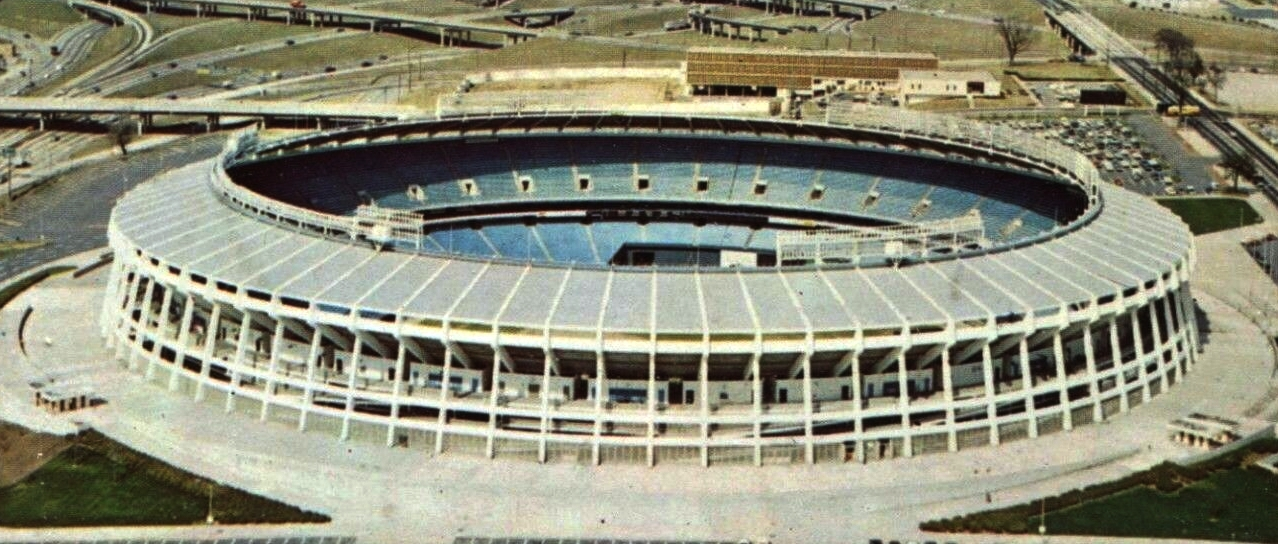
- Atlanta–Fulton County Stadium in Atlanta, Georgia, hosted the Peach Bowl.
West Virginia Mountaineers	NC State Wolfpack
(8–3)	(7–3–1)
Independent	ACC
13	49
Head coach: Bobby Bowden	Head coach: Lou Holtz
AP 18
	1	2	3	4	Total
West Virginia	13	0	0	0	13
NC State	7	7	21	14	49
- Date: December 29, 1972
- Season: 1972
- Stadium: Atlanta–Fulton County Stadium
- Location: Atlanta, Georgia
- MVP: QB Dave Buckey; DT George Bell
- Referee: B.W. Hackney (ACC; split crew: ACC, ECAC)
- Attendance: 52,671

The 1972 Peach Bowl was a college football postseason bowl game between the West Virginia Mountaineers and the NC State Wolfpack.

== Background ==
West Virginia made their first bowl since the 1969 Peach Bowl in the 3rd year of Bobby Bowden as coach. The Wolfpack finished 2nd in the Atlantic Coast Conference in Holtz's first year with the team. This was their first bowl game since 1967.

== Game summary ==
- West Virginia - Frank Nester 27 field goal
- West Virginia - Nester 39 field goal
- NC State - Don Buckey 37 pass from Dave Buckey (Ron Sewell kick)
- West Virginia - Danny Buggs 4 pass from Bernie Galiffa (Nester kick)
- NC State - Stan Fritts 1 run (Sewell kick)
- NC State - Don Buckey 2 run (Sewell kick)
- NC State - Fritts 1 run (Sewell kick)
- NC State - Fritts 4 run (Sewell kick)
- NC State - Pat Hovance 14 pass from Dave Buckey (Sewell kick)
- NC State - Willie Burden 7 run (Sewell kick)

== Aftermath ==
The Wolfpack made five more bowl games in the decade, including the Peach Bowl in 1975, which also had the Mountaineers as the opponent.

This would be the 1st of the 5 matchups between two legendary college football coaches Lou Holtz and Bobby Bowden.
