= 1972 Texas Tech Red Raiders football team =

American college football season

1972 Texas Tech Red Raiders football

Sun Bowl, L 28–32 vs. North Carolina
- Conference: Southwest Conference
- Record: 8–4 (4–3 SWC)
- Head coach: Jim Carlen (3rd season)
- Offensive scheme: No-huddle option
- Defensive coordinator: Richard Bell (3rd season)
- Base defense: 4–3
- Home stadium: Jones Stadium

1972 Southwest Conference football standings
| | Conf. | | | | | Overall |
| Team | W | | L | | T | W | | L | | T |
|---|---|---|---|---|---|---|---|---|---|---|
| No. 3 Texas $ | 7 | – | 0 | – | 0 | 10 | – | 1 | – | 0 |
| Texas Tech | 4 | – | 3 | – | 0 | 8 | – | 4 | – | 0 |
| SMU | 4 | – | 3 | – | 0 | 7 | – | 4 | – | 0 |
| Arkansas | 3 | – | 4 | – | 0 | 6 | – | 5 | – | 0 |
| Rice | 3 | – | 4 | – | 0 | 5 | – | 5 | – | 1 |
| Baylor | 3 | – | 4 | – | 0 | 5 | – | 6 | – | 0 |
| TCU | 2 | – | 5 | – | 0 | 5 | – | 6 | – | 0 |
| Texas A&M | 2 | – | 5 | – | 0 | 3 | – | 8 | – | 0 |
$ – Conference champion; Rankings from AP Poll

The 1972 Texas Tech Red Raiders football team represented Texas Tech University in the Southwest Conference (SWC) during the 1972 NCAA University Division football season. In their third season under head coach Jim Carlen, the Red Raiders compiled an 8–4 record (4–3 against conference opponents), tied for second place in the SWC, and outscored opponents by a combined total of 282 to 188. The team's statistical leaders included Joe Barnes with 1,142 passing yards, George Smith with 740 rushing yards, and Andre Tillman with 285 receiving yards. The team played its home games at Clifford B. & Audrey Jones Stadium.

== Schedule ==
| Date | Opponent | Rank | Site | Result | Attendance | Source |
|---|---|---|---|---|---|---|
| September 16 | Utah* | | Jones Stadium; Lubbock, TX | W 45–2 | 38,180 | |
| September 23 | at New Mexico* | | University Stadium; Albuquerque, NM | W 41–16 | 24,860 | |
| September 30 | No. 12 Texas | | Jones Stadium; Lubbock, TX (rivalry) | L 20–25 | 52,187 | |
| October 7 | Tulsa* | | Jones Stadium; Lubbock, TX | W 35–18 | 34,175 | |
| October 14 | at Texas A&M | | Kyle Field; College Station, TX (rivalry) | W 17–14 | 34,200 | |
| October 21 | Arizona* | | Jones Stadium; Lubbock, TX | W 35–10 | 33,320 | |
| October 28 | at No. T–18 SMU | | Cotton Bowl; Dallas, TX | W 17–3 | 35,953 | |
| November 4 | at Rice | No. 18 | Rice Stadium; Houston, TX | W 10–6 | 20,000 | |
| November 11 | TCU^{†} | No. 15 | Jones Stadium; Lubbock, TX (rivalry) | L 7–31 | 40,120 | |
| November 18 | at Baylor | | Baylor Stadium; Waco, TX (rivalry) | W 13–7 | 18,000 | |
| November 25 | Arkansas | No. 20 | Jones Stadium; Lubbock, TX (rivalry) | L 14–24 | 35,275 | |
| December 30 | vs. No. 16 North Carolina* | | Sun Bowl; El Paso, TX (Sun Bowl) | L 28–32 | 27,877 | |
*Non-conference game; ^{†}Homecoming; Rankings from AP Poll released prior to the game
