= Tom Harper (American football) =

American football player and coach (1932–1989)

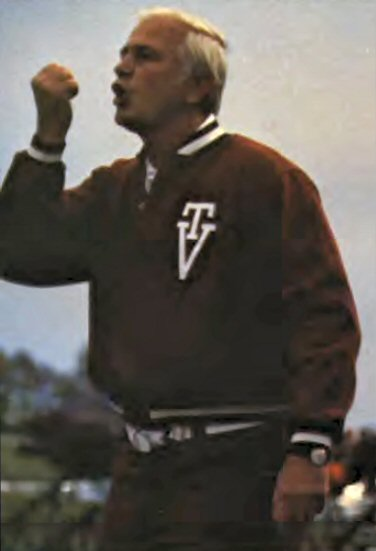
- Harper in 1979

Biographical details
- Born: August 23, 1932; Piqua, Ohio, U.S.
- Died: May 24, 1989 (aged 56); Savanna, Georgia, U.S.

Playing career
- 1952–1953: Kentucky
- Position: Tackle

Coaching career (HC unless noted)
- 1954: Kentucky (GA)
- 1958: duPont Manual HS (KY) (assistant)
- 1959–1964: duPont Manual HS (KY)
- 1965: Eastern Kentucky (OB)
- 1966–1968: Oklahoma State (assistant)
- 1969–1971: Wake Forest (assistant)
- 1972: Wake Forest
- 1973: Jacksonville Sharks (DC)
- 1974–1975: Iowa State (assistant)
- 1976–1977: North Carolina (assistant)
- 1978–1980: Virginia Tech (assistant)
- 1981–1988: Clemson (AHC/DL)

Head coaching record
- Overall: 2–9 (college); 44–19–2 (high school)

Thomas Frank Harper (August 23, 1932 – May 24, 1989) was an American football player and coach. He served as head football coach at Wake Forest University for one season, in 1972, compiling a record of 2–9. He also served as an assistant coach at the college level at Eastern Kentucky University in 1965, Oklahoma State University from 1966 to 1968, Wake Forest from 1969 to 1971, Iowa State University from 1974 to 1975, the University of North Carolina at Chapel Hill from 1976 to 1977, Virginia Tech from 1978 to 1980, and Clemson University from 1981 to 1988. In addition, Harper was the defensive coordinator for the Jacksonville Sharks of the World Football League (WFL) in 1973.

Harper began his coaching career as a graduate assistant at University of Kentucky following his graduation in 1954. After the serving in the United States Army for two years, Harper joined the coaching staff at duPont Manual High School in Louisville, Kentucky in 1958. He succeeded Bill Conde as head football coach the following year. Harper amassed a record of 44–19–2 in six seasons as head coach at Manual before leaving in 1965 to become offensive backfield coach at Eastern Kentucky under Roy Kidd.

Harper, who had recently relinquished his coaching duties to become an administrative assistant for football operations at Clemson died on May 24, 1989, of a heart attack at a hotel in Savannah, Georgia. He was in Savannah for a speaking engagement at the time of his death.

== Head coaching record ==
=== College ===
| Year | Team | Overall | Conference | Standing | Bowl/playoffs |
|---|---|---|---|---|---|
Wake Forest Demon Deacons (Atlantic Coast Conference) (1969–1971)
| 1972 | Wake Forest | 2–9 | 1–5 | T–6th | |
| Wake Forest: | | 2–9 | 1–5 | | |
| Total: | | 2–9 | | | |
