= 1972 Appalachian State Mountaineers football team =

American college football season

1972 Appalachian State Mountaineers football
- Conference: Southern Conference
- Record: 5–5–1 (0–3–1 SoCon)
- Head coach: Jim Brakefield (2nd season)
- Home stadium: Conrad Stadium

1972 Southern Conference football standings
	Conf.					Overall
Team	W		L		T	W		L		T
East Carolina $	6	–	0	–	0	9	–	2	–	0
Richmond	5	–	1	–	0	6	–	4	–	0
William & Mary	4	–	2	–	0	5	–	6	–	0
The Citadel	4	–	3	–	0	5	–	6	–	0
Davidson	2	–	3	–	1	3	–	7	–	1
VMI	1	–	5	–	0	2	–	9	–	0
Furman	1	–	6	–	0	2	–	9	–	0
Appalachian State	0	–	3	–	1	5	–	5	–	1
$ – Conference champion

The 1972 Appalachian State Mountaineers football team was an American football team that represented Appalachian State University as a member of the Southern Conference (SoCon) during the 1972 NCAA University Division football season. In their second year under head coach Jim Brakefield, the Mountaineers compiled an overall record of 5–5–1 with a mark of 0–3–1 in conference play, and finished eighth in the SoCon.

== Schedule ==
Date	Opponent	Site	Result	Attendance	Source
September 9	at Western Kentucky*	L. T. Smith Stadium; Bowling Green, KY	W 7–6	15,200	
September 16	The Citadel	Conrad Stadium; Boone, NC	L 21–28	8,000	
September 23	at East Carolina	Ficklen Memorial Stadium; Greenville, NC	L 7–35	16,410	
September 30	Furman	Conrad Stadium; Boone, NC	L 17–20	8,500	
October 7	vs. Davidson	American Legion Memorial Stadium; Charlotte, NC	T 10–10	4,000	
October 14	at South Carolina*	Williams–Brice Stadium; Columbia, SC	L 7–41	36,865	
October 21	at Lenoir Rhyne*	Moretz Stadium; Hickory, NC	W 42–13	10,500	
October 28	East Tennessee State*	Conrad Stadium; Boone, NC	W 35–34	6,500	
November 4	Florence State*	Conrad Stadium; Boone, NC	W 17–3	5,750	
November 11	Eastern Kentucky*	Conrad Stadium; Boone, NC	W 55–7	5,000	
November 18	Western Carolina*	Conrad Stadium; Boone, NC (rivalry)	L 21–35	6,500	
*Non-conference game
