= 1972 Richmond Spiders football team =

American college football season

1972 Richmond Spiders football
- Conference: Southern Conference
- Record: 6–4 (5–1 SoCon)
- Head coach: Frank Jones (7th season)
- Captains: Billy Meyers; John Nugent
- Home stadium: City Stadium

1972 Southern Conference football standings
| | Conf. | | | | | Overall |
| Team | W | | L | | T | W | | L | | T |
|---|---|---|---|---|---|---|---|---|---|---|
| East Carolina $ | 6 | – | 0 | – | 0 | 9 | – | 2 | – | 0 |
| Richmond | 5 | – | 1 | – | 0 | 6 | – | 4 | – | 0 |
| William & Mary | 4 | – | 2 | – | 0 | 5 | – | 6 | – | 0 |
| The Citadel | 4 | – | 3 | – | 0 | 5 | – | 6 | – | 0 |
| Davidson | 2 | – | 3 | – | 1 | 3 | – | 7 | – | 1 |
| VMI | 1 | – | 5 | – | 0 | 2 | – | 9 | – | 0 |
| Furman | 1 | – | 6 | – | 0 | 2 | – | 9 | – | 0 |
| Appalachian State | 0 | – | 3 | – | 1 | 5 | – | 5 | – | 1 |
$ – Conference champion

The 1972 Richmond Spiders football team was an American football team that represented the University of Richmond as a member of the Southern Conference (SoCon) during the 1972 NCAA University Division football season. In their seventh season under head coach Frank Jones, Richmond compiled a 6–4 record, with a mark of 5–1 in conference play, finishing second in the SoCon.

== Schedule ==
| Date | Opponent | Site | Result | Attendance | Source |
|---|---|---|---|---|---|
| September 9 | at North Carolina* | Kenan Memorial Stadium; Chapel Hill, NC | L 18–28 | 31,500 | |
| September 16 | at West Virginia* | Mountaineer Field; Morgantown, WV | L 7–28 | 31,000 | |
| September 23 | Northeast Louisiana* | City Stadium; Richmond, VA | W 17–0 | 7,500 | |
| September 30 | VMI | City Stadium; Richmond, VA (rivalry) | W 34–15 | | |
| October 7 | East Carolina | City Stadium; Richmond, VA | L 0–21 | 7,500 | |
| October 14 | Southern Miss* | City Stadium; Richmond, VA | L 9–34 | 2,500 | |
| October 21 | at Furman | Sirrine Stadium; Greenville, SC | W 37–0 | 12,500 | |
| November 4 | at The Citadel | Johnson Hagood Stadium; Charleston, SC | W 21–7 | 11,680 | |
| November 11 | Davidson | City Stadium; Richmond, VA | W 20–14 | 8,650 | |
| November 18 | William & Mary | City Stadium; Richmond, VA (rivalry) | W 20–3 | 11,500 | |
*Non-conference game
