= 1972 Texas Longhorns football team =

American college football season

1972 Texas Longhorns football

SWC champion

Cotton Bowl Classic, W 17–13 vs. Alabama
- Conference: Southwest Conference

Ranking
- Coaches: No. 5
- AP: No. 3
- Record: 10–1 (7–0 SWC)
- Head coach: Darrell Royal (16th season)
- Offensive coordinator: Fred Akers
- Offensive scheme: Wishbone
- Defensive coordinator: Mike Campbell
- Base defense: 4–4
- Home stadium: Memorial Stadium

1972 Southwest Conference football standings
	Conf.					Overall
Team	W		L		T	W		L		T
No. 3 Texas $	7	–	0	–	0	10	–	1	–	0
Texas Tech	4	–	3	–	0	8	–	4	–	0
SMU	4	–	3	–	0	7	–	4	–	0
Arkansas	3	–	4	–	0	6	–	5	–	0
Rice	3	–	4	–	0	5	–	5	–	1
Baylor	3	–	4	–	0	5	–	6	–	0
TCU	2	–	5	–	0	5	–	6	–	0
Texas A&M	2	–	5	–	0	3	–	8	–	0
$ – Conference champion; Rankings from AP Poll

The 1972 Texas Longhorns football team represented the University of Texas at Austin in the 1972 NCAA University Division football season. The Longhorns finished the regular season with a 9–1 record and defeated Alabama in the Cotton Bowl Classic. Barry Switzer admitted in his autobiography that Oklahoma spied on Texas in 1972; the Oklahoma game was Texas' only loss all season.

== Schedule ==
Date	Time	Opponent	Rank	Site	TV	Result	Attendance	Source
September 23	7:30 p.m.	Miami (FL)*	No. 14	Memorial Stadium; Austin, TX		W 23–10	62,000	
September 30	7:30 p.m.	at Texas Tech	No. 12	Jones Stadium; Lubbock, TX (rivalry)		W 25–20	52,187	
October 7	7:30 p.m.	Utah State*	No. 9	Memorial Stadium; Austin, TX		W 27–12	58,122	
October 14	2:50 p.m.	vs. No. 2 Oklahoma*	No. 10	Cotton Bowl; Dallas, TX (rivalry)	ABC	L 0–27	72,030	
October 21		No. 17 Arkansas	No. 14	Memorial Stadium; Austin, TX (rivalry)	ABC	W 35–15	80,844	
October 28	7:30 p.m.	at Rice	No. 10	Rice Stadium; Houston, TX (rivalry)		W 45–9	65,000	
November 4	2:00 p.m.	SMU	No. 9	Memorial Stadium; Austin, TX		W 17–9	72,500	
November 11	2:00 p.m.	at Baylor	No. 9	Baylor Stadium; Waco, TX (rivalry)		W 17–3	48,394	
November 18	2:00 p.m.	at TCU	No. 7	Amon G. Carter Stadium; Fort Worth, TX (rivalry)		W 27–0	33,536	
November 23	8:05 p.m.	Texas A&M	No. 7	Memorial Stadium; Austin, TX (rivalry)	ABC	W 38–3	68,000	
January 1, 1973	1:00 p.m.	vs. No. 4 Alabama*	No. 7	Cotton Bowl; Dallas, TX (Cotton Bowl Classic)	CBS	W 17–13	72,032	
*Non-conference game; Rankings from AP Poll released prior to the game; All times are in Central time

== Rankings ==
Ranking movements Legend: ██ Increase in ranking ██ Decrease in ranking — = Not ranked т = Tied with team above or below
	Week														
Poll	Pre	1	2	3	4	5	6	7	8	9	10	11	12	13	Final
AP	14	15	14	12	9	10	14 т	10	9	9	7	7	6	7	3
Coaches	15	13	15	14	10	11	—	11	9	9	6	6	5	5	Not released

== Roster ==
1972 Texas Longhorns football team roster
Players
Coaches
Offense

Pos.	#	Name	Class
QB		Marty Akins
RB		Tommy Landry
FB		Roosevelt Leaks
QB		Alan Lowry
OL		Jerry Sisemore
WR		Julius Whittier

Defense

Pos.	#	Name	Class
DB		Tommy Keel

Special teams

Pos.	#	Name	Class

Head coach

- Darrell Royal

Coordinators/assistant coaches

- Fred Akers

Legend

- (C) Team captain
- (S) Suspended
- (I) Ineligible
- Injured
- Redshirt
