= 1972 Baylor Bears football team =

American college football season

1972 Baylor Bears football
- Conference: Southwest Conference
- Record: 5–6 (3–4 SWC)
- Head coach: Grant Teaff (1st season)
- Offensive coordinator: George Kirk
- Home stadium: Baylor Stadium

1972 Southwest Conference football standings
	Conf.					Overall
Team	W		L		T	W		L		T
No. 3 Texas $	7	–	0	–	0	10	–	1	–	0
Texas Tech	4	–	3	–	0	8	–	4	–	0
SMU	4	–	3	–	0	7	–	4	–	0
Arkansas	3	–	4	–	0	6	–	5	–	0
Rice	3	–	4	–	0	5	–	5	–	1
Baylor	3	–	4	–	0	5	–	6	–	0
TCU	2	–	5	–	0	5	–	6	–	0
Texas A&M	2	–	5	–	0	3	–	8	–	0
$ – Conference champion; Rankings from AP Poll

The 1972 Baylor Bears football team represented the Baylor University in the 1972 NCAA University Division football season. Grant Teaff was hired to resurrect the moribund football team at Baylor. Baylor originally hired Rudy Feldman from New Mexico, but Feldman quit after one day, leaving the job to Teaff. Baylor had been 7–43–1 in the five seasons preceding Teaff's arrival. The Bears offense scored 180 points, while the Bears defense allowed 156 points. In the Battle of the Brazos, the Bears beat Texas A&M by a score of 15–13.

== Schedule ==
Date	Time	Opponent	Site	Result	Attendance	Source
September 16		at No. 16 Georgia*	Sanford Stadium; Athens, GA	L 14–24	53,201	
September 23		at Missouri*	Faurot Field; Columbia, MO	W 27–0	42,000	
October 7	7:30 p.m.	Miami (FL)*	Baylor Stadium; Waco, TX	W 10–3	35,000	
October 14		at No. 20 Arkansas	Razorback Stadium; Fayetteville, AR	L 20–31	41,670	
October 21		at Oklahoma State*	Lewis Field; Stillwater, OK	L 7–20	39,000	
October 28		Texas A&M^{†}	Baylor Stadium; Waco, TX (rivalry)	W 15–13	40,000	
November 4		at TCU	Amon G. Carter Stadium; Fort Worth, TX (rivalry)	W 42–9	22,925	
November 11		No. 9 Texas	Baylor Stadium; Waco, TX (rivalry)	L 3–17	48,394	
November 18		Texas Tech	Baylor Stadium; Waco, TX (rivalry)	L 7–13	18,000	
November 25		at SMU	Cotton Bowl; Dallas, TX	L 7–12	18,035	
December 2		Rice	Baylor Stadium; Waco, TX	W 28–14	26,000	
*Non-conference game; ^{†}Homecoming; Rankings from AP Poll released prior to the game; All times are in Central time
