= 1972 North Carolina Tar Heels football team =

American college football season

1972 North Carolina Tar Heels football

ACC champion

Sun Bowl, W 32–28 vs. Texas Tech
- Conference: Atlantic Coast Conference

Ranking
- Coaches: No. 14
- AP: No. 12
- Record: 11–1 (6–0 ACC)
- Head coach: Bill Dooley (6th season)
- Offensive coordinator: Bobby Collins (6th season)
- Captains: Gene Brown; Ron Rusnak
- Home stadium: Kenan Memorial Stadium

1972 Atlantic Coast Conference football standings
	Conf.					Overall
Team	W		L		T	W		L		T
No. 12 North Carolina $	6	–	0	–	0	11	–	1	–	0
No. 17 NC State	4	–	1	–	1	8	–	3	–	1
Maryland	3	–	2	–	1	5	–	5	–	1
Duke	3	–	3	–	0	5	–	6	–	0
Clemson	2	–	4	–	0	4	–	7	–	0
Virginia	1	–	5	–	0	4	–	7	–	0
Wake Forest	1	–	5	–	0	2	–	9	–	0
$ – Conference champion; Rankings from AP Poll

The 1972 North Carolina Tar Heels football team represented the North Carolina Tar Heels of University of North Carolina at Chapel Hill during the 1972 NCAA University Division football season. The team won its second consecutive Atlantic Coast Conference (ACC) championship, going 6–0 in conference play, and played in the 1972 Sun Bowl, defeating Texas Tech by a score of 32–28. The Tar Heels ended the year ranked 12th in the AP Poll with an 11–1 record—the lone loss coming at Ohio State in their fourth game. This was the first of only four seasons where North Carolina was able to win 11 games.

== Schedule ==
Date	Time	Opponent	Rank	Site	TV	Result	Attendance	Source
September 9	1:30 p.m.	Richmond*		Kenan Memorial Stadium; Chapel Hill, NC		W 28–18	31,500	
September 16	1:30 p.m.	Maryland		Byrd Stadium; College Park, MD		W 31–26	28,000	
September 23	1:30 p.m.	NC State		Kenan Memorial Stadium; Chapel Hill, NC (rivalry)		W 34–33	47,000	
September 30	1:30 p.m.	at No. 5 Ohio State*		Ohio Stadium; Columbus, OH		L 14–29	86,180	
October 14	1:30 p.m.	Kentucky*		Kenan Memorial Stadium; Chapel Hill, NC		W 31–20	42,500	
October 21	1:30 p.m.	at Wake Forest		Groves Stadium; Winston-Salem, NC (rivalry)	ABC	W 21–0	27,000	
November 4	1:30 p.m.	at Clemson		Memorial Stadium; Clemson, SC		W 26–10	38,235	
November 11	1:30 p.m.	Virginia	No. 18	Kenan Memorial Stadium; Chapel Hill, NC (South's Oldest Rivalry)		W 23–3	36,500	
November 18	1:30 p.m.	Duke	No. 16	Kenan Memorial Stadium; Chapel Hill, NC (Victory Bell)	ABC	W 14–0	47,000	
November 25	1:30 p.m.	East Carolina*	No. 15	Kenan Memorial Stadium; Chapel Hill, NC		W 42–19	31,600	
December 9	2:00 p.m.	vs. Florida*	No. 16	Gator Bowl Stadium; Jacksonville, FL		W 28–24	33,103	
December 30	1:00 p.m.	vs. Texas Tech*	No. 16	Sun Bowl; El Paso, TX (Sun Bowl)	CBS	W 32–28	27,877	
*Non-conference game; Rankings from AP Poll released prior to the game; All times are in Eastern time

== Game summaries ==
=== Ohio State ===
North Carolina Tar Heels at Ohio State Buckeyes

Quarter	1	2	3	4	Total
North Carolina	7	0	0	7	14
Ohio St	3	6	14	6	29

at Ohio Stadium, Columbus, Ohio

- Date: September 30, 1972
- Game time: 1:30 p.m.
- Game weather: Cloudy, 49 °F (9 °C)
- Game attendance: 86,180
- Box Score

Game information

First quarter

- UNC – Gene Brown recovered blocked punt in end zone (Ellis Alexander kick), 9:37. North Carolina 7–0.
- OSU – Blair Conway 22-yard field goal, 0:06. North Carolina 7–3. Drive: 73 yards.

Second quarter

- OSU – Greg Hare 17-yard run (kick failed), 11:50. Ohio St 9–7. Drive: 47 yards.

Third quarter

- OSU – Randal Keith 11-yard run (Blair Conway kick), 8:41. Ohio St 16–7. Drive: 87 yards.
- OSU – Champ Henson 9-yard run (Blair Conway kick), 2:00. Ohio St 23–7. Drive: 84 yards.

Fourth quarter

- OSU – Archie Griffin 9-yard run (Blair Conway kick), 4:13. Ohio St 30–7. Drive: 31 yards.
- UNC – Earle Bethea 37-yard pass from Nick Vidnovic (Ellis Alexander), 0:00. Ohio St 30–14. Drive: 1 play, 37 yards, 0:05.

Top passers

- UNC – Nick Vidnovic – 4/14, 65 yards, TD, 2 INT
- OSU – Greg Hare – 5/12, 96 yards, INT

Top rushers

- UNC – Ike Oglesby – 14 rushes, 67 yards
- OSU – Archie Griffin – 27 rushes, 239 yards, TD

Top receivers

- UNC – Earle Bethea – 1 reception, 37 yards, TD
- OSU – Richard Galbos – 3 receptions, 72 yards

== Personnel ==
1972 North Carolina Tar Heels football team roster
Players
Coaches
Offense

Pos.	#	Name	Class
WR		Earle Bethea
RB		Ike Oglesby
QB		Nick Vidnovic	Jr

Defense

Pos.	#	Name	Class
DL		Gene Brown

Special teams

Pos.	#	Name	Class
K		Ellis Alexander

Head coach

- Bill Dooley

Coordinators/assistant coaches

Legend

- (C) Team captain
- (S) Suspended
- (I) Ineligible
- Injured
- Redshirt
