= Silver Creek Central School District =

School district in the U.S. state of New York

Address
- 1 Dickinson Street Silver Creek, New York, 14136; United States
- Coordinates: 42.533074°N 79.163146°W

District information
- Motto: Black knight pride
- Grades: PK-12
- Established: 1881
- Superintendent: Dr.Katie Ralston
- NCES District ID: 3626880.

Students and staff
- Enrollment: 1,051 (as of 2020-21)
- Staff: 127.3 (FTE) (as of 2007-08)
- Student–teacher ratio: 10.2 (as of 2007-08)
- Athletic conference: Section 6 D - Central
- Colors: Black and Old Gold

Other information
- Website: https://www.silvercreekschools.org/

Silver Creek Central School District is a public school district serving Silver Creek, New York. The district has three schools to serve students in prekindergarten through grade 12.

== Academics ==
In 2009, Silver Creek High School ranked 69th out of 131 Western New York high schools in terms of academic performance.

== History ==
Organized education in Silver Creek dates back to 1823. Classes were held in one-room schoolhouses and other locations until a two-story schoolhouse was constructed in the early 1860s. That building was replaced in 1879 and the first graduation took place in 1882. A separate grade school building was constructed in 1897, followed by a junior-senior high school building in 1920. These buildings are known as the Babcock Avenue School (converted into apartments in the 1980s) and the Main Street School. The school district was centralized in 1956 and the current high school building on Dickinson Street began construction in 1958.

== Campus ==
The Silver Creek Central School campus contains the elementary, middle, and high schools. As of 2009, the school is undergoing approximately $9 million in construction, including renovation and upgrades to the air conditioning and electrical systems.

== Extracurricular activities ==
The school's athletic teams, known as the Black Knights, compete in New York State Public High School Athletic Association Section 6 D - Central. Teams are fielded in baseball, basketball, bowling, cross country, football, golf, lacrosse, soccer, softball, swimming, track and field, volleyball, and wrestling.

== Notable alumni ==
- George Carter, a former NBA and ABA professional basketball player
