= 1990 NCAA Division III football season =

American college football season

- Regular season: August – November 1990
- Playoffs: November – December 1990
- National championship: Hawkins Stadium; Bradenton, FL
- Champion: Allegheny

The 1990 NCAA Division III football season, part of the college football season organized by the NCAA at the Division III level in the United States, began in August 1990, and concluded with the NCAA Division III Football Championship, also known as the Stagg Bowl, in December 1990 at Hawkins Stadium in Bradenton, Florida. The Allegheny Gators won their first Division III championship by defeating the Lycoming Warriors, 21−14, in overtime.

== Conference and program changes ==
- The University Athletic Association began sponsoring football in 1990 with four members. Case Western Reserve held a dual membership and played a full conference schedule in both the UAA and the NCAC.

Team	1989 conference	1990 conference
Bluffton	Independent (NAIA)	Independent (D-III)
Carnegie Mellon	PAC	UAA
Case Western Reserve	NCAC	NCAC/UAA (Dual Membership)
Chicago	D-III Independent	UAA
Guilford	NAIA Independent	ODAC
Hiram	PAC	OAC
Kentucky Wesleyan	Mid-South (NAIA)	D-III Independent
Rochester	D-III Independent	UAA
Thomas More	New program	D-III Independent
Washington (MO)	D-III Independent	UAA
Waynesburg	Independent (NAIA)	PAC
Wilmington (OH)	Independent (NAIA)	Independent (D-III)

== Conference standings ==
1990 Atlantic Collegiate Football Conference standings
	Conf.					Overall
Team	W		L		T	W		L		T
Marist $	5	–	0	–	0	7	–	2	–	1
Saint Francis (PA)	4	–	1	–	0	4	–	6	–	0
St. John Fisher	3	–	2	–	0	3	–	7	–	0
Brooklyn	1	–	4	–	0	2	–	6	–	0
Gallaudet	1	–	4	–	0	1	–	8	–	0
Siena	1	–	4	–	0	1	–	8	–	0
$ – Conference champion

1990 Centennial Conference football standings
	Conf.					Overall
Team	W		L		T	W		L		T
Dickinson $	5	–	1	–	1	8	–	1	–	1
Western Maryland	5	–	2	–	0	6	–	3	–	1
Johns Hopkins	4	–	2	–	1	5	–	4	–	1
Swarthmore	4	–	3	–	0	7	–	3	–	0
Gettysburg	4	–	3	–	0	4	–	5	–	1
Ursinus	2	–	5	–	0	4	–	5	–	0
Franklin & Marshall	2	–	5	–	0	3	–	7	–	0
Muhlenberg	1	–	6	–	0	2	–	8	–	0
$ – Conference champion

1990 College Athletic Conference football standings
	Conf.					Overall
Team	W		L		T	W		L		T
Centre +	3	–	1	–	0	8	–	2	–	0
Sewanee +	3	–	1	–	0	6	–	3	–	0
Rhodes	2	–	2	–	0	7	–	2	–	0
Millsaps	2	–	2	–	0	5	–	4	–	0
Trinity (TX)	0	–	4	–	0	1	–	9	–	0
+ – Conference co-champions

1990 College Conference of Illinois and Wisconsin football standings
	Conf.					Overall
Team	W		L		T	W		L		T
Augustana (IL) +^	7	–	1	–	0	8	–	2	–	0
Millikin +	7	–	1	–	0	7	–	2	–	0
Illinois Wesleyan	6	–	2	–	0	7	–	2	–	0
Carroll (WI)	5	–	3	–	0	6	–	3	–	0
Carthage	4	–	4	–	0	5	–	4	–	0
Wheaton (IL)	4	–	4	–	0	4	–	5	–	0
North Central (IL)	2	–	6	–	0	2	–	7	–	0
North Park	1	–	7	–	0	1	–	8	–	0
Elmhurst	0	–	8	–	0	0	–	9	–	0
+ – Conference co-champions; ^ – NCAA Division III playoff participant

1990 Eastern Collegiate Football Conference standings
	Conf.					Overall
Team	W		L		T	W		L		T
Bentley $	4	–	0	–	0	7	–	1	–	0
Stonehill	3	–	1	–	0	3	–	4	–	1
Assumption	2	–	2	–	0	4	–	4	–	0
Western New England	1	–	3	–	0	2	–	5	–	0
MIT	1	–	3	–	0	2	–	6	–	0
$ – Conference champion

1990 Indiana Collegiate Athletic Conference football standings
	Conf.					Overall
Team	W		L		T	W		L		T
DePauw $	7	–	0	–	0	8	–	2	–	0
Rose–Hulman	6	–	1	–	0	7	–	3	–	0
Hanover	4	–	3	–	0	6	–	4	–	0
Wabash	4	–	3	–	0	4	–	5	–	0
Anderson (IN)	3	–	4	–	0	3	–	7	–	0
Taylor	2	–	5	–	0	5	–	5	–	0
Franklin (IN)	2	–	5	–	0	4	–	6	–	0
Manchester	0	–	7	–	0	1	–	9	–	0
$ – Conference champion

1990 Independent College Athletic Conference football standings
	Conf.					Overall
Team	W		L		T	W		L		T
Ithaca +^	2	–	0	–	0	8	–	2	–	0
RPI +	2	–	0	–	0	6	–	1	–	2
Alfred	2	–	1	–	0	4	–	6	–	0
St. Lawrence	2	–	2	–	0	6	–	4	–	0
Hobart	0	–	3	–	0	1	–	9	–	0
+ – Conference co-champions; ^ – NCAA Division III playoff participant

1990 Iowa Conference football standings
	Conf.					Overall
Team	W		L		T	W		L		T
Central (IA) $^	8	–	0	–	0	10	–	2	–	0
Wartburg	7	–	1	–	0	9	–	1	–	0
Simpson (IA)	6	–	2	–	0	8	–	2	–	0
Loras	5	–	3	–	0	7	–	3	–	0
Luther	4	–	4	–	0	4	–	5	–	0
Upper Iowa	3	–	5	–	0	4	–	6	–	0
Dubuque	2	–	6	–	0	2	–	7	–	0
Buena Vista	1	–	7	–	0	1	–	9	–	0
William Penn	0	–	8	–	0	0	–	9	–	0
$ – Conference champion; ^ – NCAA Division III playoff participant

1990 Liberty Football Conference standings
	Conf.					Overall
Team	W		L		T	W		L		T
C. W. Post $	5	–	0	–	0	7	–	3	–	0
Merchant Marine	4	–	1	–	0	6	–	3	–	0
St. John's	3	–	2	–	0	5	–	5	–	0
Iona	2	–	3	–	0	5	–	5	–	0
Stony Brook	1	–	4	–	0	1	–	8	–	0
Pace	0	–	5	–	0	1	–	9	–	0
$ – Conference champion

1990 Michigan Intercollegiate Athletic Association football standings
	Conf.					Overall
Team	W		L		T	W		L		T
Albion $	4	–	0	–	1	7	–	1	–	1
Hope	3	–	1	–	1	6	–	1	–	2
Olivet	3	–	2	–	0	4	–	5	–	0
Adrian	2	–	2	–	1	4	–	4	–	1
Kalamazoo	1	–	3	–	1	3	–	5	–	1
Alma	0	–	5	–	0	3	–	6	–	0
$ – Conference champion

1990 Middle Atlantic Conference football standings
	Conf.					Overall
Team	W		L		T	W		L		T
Lycoming $^	8	–	0	–	0	12	–	1	–	0
Juniata	6	–	2	–	0	7	–	2	–	1
Widener	6	–	2	–	0	7	–	2	–	1
Susquehanna	6	–	2	–	0	7	–	3	–	0
Moravian	4	–	4	–	0	4	–	4	–	0
Lebanon Valley	3	–	5	–	0	4	–	6	–	0
Delaware Valley	2	–	6	–	0	3	–	7	–	0
Albright	1	–	7	–	0	2	–	8	–	0
Wilkes	0	–	8	–	0	1	–	9	–	0
$ – Conference champion; ^ – NCAA Division III playoff participant

1990 Midwest Conference football standings
	Conf.					Overall
Team	W		L		T	W		L		T
North Division
Beloit xy	6	–	0	–	0	8	–	2	–	0
St. Norbert	4	–	2	–	0	4	–	5	–	0
Ripon	4	–	2	–	0	7	–	2	–	0
Lawrence	2	–	4	–	0	4	–	5	–	0
Lake Forest	0	–	6	–	0	1	–	8	–	0
South Division
Coe xy$	6	–	0	–	0	8	–	2	–	0
Monmouth (IL)	6	–	1	–	0	7	–	2	–	0
Cornell (IA)	3	–	4	–	0	5	–	4	–	0
Knox	2	–	4	–	0	3	–	6	–	0
Illinois College	2	–	5	–	0	4	–	5	–	0
Grinnell	0	–	7	–	0	0	–	8	–	1
Championship: Coe 34, Beloit 14
$ – Conference champion; x – Division champion/co-champions; y – Championship game participant

1990 Minnesota Intercollegiate Athletic Conference football standings
	Conf.					Overall
Team	W		L		T	W		L		T
St. Thomas (MN) +^	7	–	2	–	0	8	–	3	–	1
Concordia–Moorhead +	7	–	2	–	0	7	–	3	–	0
Bethel (MN)	6	–	3	–	0	7	–	3	–	0
Hamline	6	–	3	–	0	7	–	3	–	0
Saint John's (MN)	6	–	3	–	0	7	–	3	–	0
Carleton	5	–	4	–	0	5	–	5	–	0
Gustavus Adolphus	4	–	5	–	0	5	–	5	–	0
St. Olaf	3	–	6	–	0	4	–	6	–	0
Macalester	1	–	8	–	0	1	–	9	–	0
Augsburg	0	–	9	–	0	0	–	10	–	0
+ – Conference co-champions; ^ – NCAA Division III playoff participant

1990 New England Football Conference standings
	Conf.					Overall
Team	W		L		T	W		L		T
North Division
Plymouth State xy$	5	–	0	–	0	9	–	1	–	0
Lowell	4	–	1	–	0	8	–	1	–	0
Maine Maritime	3	–	2	–	0	5	–	4	–	0
Nichols	2	–	3	–	0	5	–	4	–	0
UMass–Boston	1	–	4	–	0	4	–	5	–	0
Curry	0	–	5	–	0	2	–	7	–	0
South Division
Bridgewater State xy	6	–	0	–	0	8	–	2	–	0
Worcester State	5	–	1	–	0	5	–	4	–	0
Framingham State	3	–	3	–	0	4	–	5	–	0
Massachusetts Maritime	2	–	4	–	0	3	–	6	–	0
Westfield State	2	–	4	–	0	3	–	7	–	0
Fitchburg State	2	–	4	–	0	2	–	7	–	0
Southeastern Massachusetts	1	–	5	–	0	1	–	8	–	0
Championship: Plymouth State 26, Bridgewater State 7
$ – Conference champion; x – Division champion/co-champions; y – Championship game participant

1990 New England Small College Athletic Conference football standings
	Conf.					Overall
Team	W		L		T	W		L		T
Williams	8	–	0	–	0	8	–	0	–	0
Trinity (CT)	6	–	1	–	0	6	–	2	–	0
Tufts	6	–	2	–	0	6	–	2	–	0
Wesleyan	5	–	2	–	0	6	–	2	–	0
Middlebury	3	–	4	–	0	4	–	4	–	0
Colby	3	–	5	–	0	3	–	5	–	0
Hamilton	2	–	5	–	0	2	–	6	–	0
Bates	2	–	6	–	0	2	–	6	–	0
Amherst	1	–	6	–	0	1	–	7	–	0
Bowdoin	1	–	6	–	0	1	–	7	–	0
The NESCAC did not recognize an official conference champion until 2000

1990 New Jersey Athletic Conference football standings
	Conf.					Overall
Team	W		L		T	W		L		T
Trenton State $^	5	–	1	–	0	10	–	2	–	0
Ramapo	5	–	1	–	0	10	–	1	–	0
Montclair State	4	–	2	–	0	7	–	3	–	0
Glassboro State	3	–	3	–	0	7	–	3	–	0
Kean	3	–	3	–	0	5	–	5	–	0
William Paterson	1	–	5	–	0	5	–	5	–	0
Jersey City State	0	–	6	–	0	3	–	6	–	1
$ – Conference champion; ^ – NCAA Division III playoff participant

1990 North Coast Athletic Conference football standings
	Conf.					Overall
Team	W		L		T	W		L		T
Allegheny $^	7	–	0	–	0	13	–	0	–	1
Ohio Wesleyan	7	–	1	–	0	9	–	1	–	0
Wittenberg	6	–	2	–	0	7	–	3	–	0
Kenyon	4	–	3	–	0	6	–	4	–	0
Denison	3	–	4	–	0	6	–	4	–	0
Wooster	3	–	5	–	0	3	–	7	–	0
Case Western Reserve*	2	–	4	–	0	4	–	6	–	0
Earlham	1	–	6	–	0	2	–	8	–	0
Oberlin	0	–	8	–	0	1	–	9	–	0
$ – Conference champion; ^ – NCAA Division III playoff participant; * - Case Western Reserve held a dual affiliation and played a complete conference schedule in both the UAA and the NCAC

1990 Ohio Athletic Conference football standings
	Conf.					Overall
Team	W		L		T	W		L		T
Mount Union $^	9	–	0	–	0	10	–	1	–	0
John Carroll	8	–	1	–	0	8	–	2	–	0
Baldwin–Wallace	6	–	2	–	1	7	–	2	–	1
Capital	5	–	4	–	0	6	–	4	–	0
Ohio Northern	4	–	5	–	0	5	–	5	–	0
Otterbein	3	–	4	–	2	3	–	5	–	2
Heidelberg	3	–	6	–	0	3	–	7	–	0
Muskingum	2	–	7	–	0	3	–	7	–	0
Marietta	2	–	7	–	0	2	–	8	–	0
Hiram	1	–	7	–	1	1	–	8	–	1
$ – Conference champion; ^ – NCAA Division III playoff participant

1990 Old Dominion Athletic Conference football standings
	Conf.					Overall
Team	W		L		T	W		L		T
Emory & Henry $	4	–	0	–	0	6	–	4	–	0
Hampden–Sydney	2	–	2	–	0	6	–	4	–	0
Randolph–Macon	2	–	2	–	0	5	–	4	–	1
Washington and Lee	1	–	3	–	0	5	–	5	–	0
Bridgewater	1	–	3	–	0	3	–	7	–	0
Guilford*	0	–	0	–	0	7	–	3	–	0
$ – Conference champion; * - Ineligible for conference title

1990 Presidents' Athletic Conference football standings
	Conf.					Overall
Team	W		L		T	W		L		T
Washington & Jefferson $^	4	–	0	–	0	10	–	1	–	0
Waynesburg	3	–	1	–	0	6	–	4	–	0
Thiel	1	–	3	–	0	4	–	5	–	0
Bethany (WV)	1	–	3	–	0	1	–	7	–	1
Grove City	1	–	3	–	0	1	–	8	–	0
$ – Conference champion; ^ – NCAA Division III playoff participant

1990 Southern California Intercollegiate Athletic Conference football standings
	Conf.					Overall
Team	W		L		T	W		L		T
Redlands $^	5	–	0	–	0	8	–	2	–	0
Occidental	4	–	1	–	0	6	–	3	–	0
La Verne	2	–	2	–	1	4	–	5	–	0
Pomona-Pitzer	2	–	3	–	0	3	–	5	–	0
Claremont-Mudd	1	–	3	–	1	2	–	7	–	0
Whittier	0	–	5	–	0	0	–	9	–	0
$ – Conference champion; ^ – NCAA Division III playoff participant; Each team played one other conference member twice. A head-to-head sweep of the two games counted as one win for the winner and one loss for the loser in the conference standings. A split of the two games counted as a tie for each team.

1990 University Athletic Association football standings
	Conf.					Overall
Team	W		L		T	W		L		T
Carnegie Mellon $^	4	–	0	–	0	10	–	1	–	0
Washington (MO)	2	–	2	–	0	7	–	3	–	0
Rochester (NY)	2	–	2	–	0	5	–	5	–	0
Case Western Reserve*	2	–	2	–	0	4	–	6	–	0
Chicago	0	–	4	–	0	1	–	9	–	0
$ – Conference champion; ^ – NCAA Division III playoff participant; * - Case Western Reserve held a dual affiliation and played a complete conference schedule in both the UAA and the NCAC

1990 Wisconsin State University Conference football standings
	Conf.					Overall
Team	W		L		T	W		L		T
Wisconsin–Whitewater $^	8	–	0	–	0	10	–	1	–	0
No. 4 Wisconsin–La Crosse *	7	–	1	–	0	9	–	2	–	0
Wisconsin–Platteville	5	–	3	–	0	7	–	3	–	0
Wisconsin–Stevens Point	4	–	4	–	0	6	–	4	–	0
Wisconsin–River Falls	3	–	4	–	1	5	–	4	–	1
Wisconsin–Oshkosh	3	–	4	–	1	4	–	5	–	1
Wisconsin–Stout	3	–	5	–	0	4	–	6	–	0
Wisconsin–Eau Claire	1	–	7	–	0	2	–	8	–	0
Wisconsin–Superior	1	–	7	–	0	1	–	8	–	0
$ – Conference champion; ^ – NCAA Division III playoff participant; * – NAIA Division II playoff participant; Rankings from NAIA Division II poll

1990 NCAA Division III independents football records
	Conf.			Overall
Team	W	L	T	W		L		T
Hofstra ^		–		12	–	1	–	0
Dayton ^		–		11	–	1	–	0
WPI		–		8	–	0	–	1
Cortland ^		–		9	–	1	–	0
Frostburg State		–		9	–	1	–	0
Union (NY)		–		9	–	1	–	0
Ferrum ^		–		8	–	2	–	0
Buffalo State		–		7	–	2	–	0
San Diego		–		7	–	2	–	0
Bluffton		–		6	–	3	–	0
Gannon		–		6	–	3	–	0
Davidson		–		5	–	3	–	0
Menlo		–		5	–	3	–	0
Canisius		–		6	–	4	–	0
Drake		–		6	–	4	–	0
Quincy		–		6	–	4	–	0
UC Santa Barbara		–		6	–	4	–	0
Aurora		–		5	–	4	–	0
Catholic University		–		5	–	5	–	0
Georgetown		–		5	–	5	–	0
Maryville (TN)		–		5	–	5	–	0
Wagner		–		5	–	5	–	0
Wesley		–		5	–	5	–	0
Upsala		–		4	–	4	–	1
Colorado College		–		4	–	5	–	0
Wilmington (OH)		–		4	–	5	–	0
Thomas More		–		3	–	6	–	0
Albany		–		3	–	7	–	0
Brockport		–		3	–	7	–	0
Western Connecticut State		–		3	–	7	–	0
Buffalo		–		2	–	8	–	0
Duquesne		–		1	–	8	–	1
Mercyhurst		–		1	–	8	–	0
Norwich		–		1	–	8	–	0
Salisbury State		–		1	–	8	–	0
Saint Peter's		–		0	–	7	–	0
Fairleigh Dickinson–Florham		–		0	–	9	–	0
Kentucky Wesleyan		–		0	–	10	–	0
Methodist		–		0	–	10	–	0
^ – NCAA Division III playoff participant

== Conference champions ==
Conference champions
- Centennial Conference – Dickinson
- College Athletic Conference – Centre and Sewanee
- College Conference of Illinois and Wisconsin – Augustana (IL) and Millikin
- Indiana Collegiate Athletic Conference – DePauw
- Iowa Intercollegiate Athletic Conference – Central (IA)
- Michigan Intercollegiate Athletic Association – Albion
- Middle Atlantic Conference – Lycoming
- Midwest Collegiate Athletic Conference – Coe
- Minnesota Intercollegiate Athletic Conference – Concordia–Moorhead and St. Thomas (MN)
- New England Football Conference – Plymouth State
- New Jersey State Athletic Conference – Trenton State
- North Coast Athletic Conference – Allegheny
- Ohio Athletic Conference – Mount Union
- Old Dominion Athletic Conference – Emory & Henry
- Presidents' Athletic Conference – Washington & Jefferson
- Southern California Intercollegiate Athletic Conference – Redlands
- Texas Intercollegiate Athletic Association – Tarleton State
- University Athletic Association – Carnegie Mellon
- Upper Midwest Athletic Conference – Maranatha Baptist and Northwestern–St. Paul
- Wisconsin Intercollegiate Athletic Conference – Wisconsin–Whitewater

== Postseason ==
The 1990 NCAA Division III Football Championship playoffs were the 18th annual single-elimination tournament to determine the national champion of men's NCAA Division III college football. The championship Stagg Bowl game was held at Hawkins Stadium in Bradenton, Florida for the first time. Like the previous five tournaments, this year's bracket featured sixteen teams.

=== Playoff bracket ===
First Round; Campus Sites
Hofstra	35
Cortland	9
Trenton State	24
Ithaca	14
Washington & Jefferson	10
Ferrum	7
Lycoming	17
Carnegie Mellon	7
Dayton	24
Augustana (IL)	14
Allegheny	26
Mount Union	15
St. Thomas (MN)	24
Wisconsin–Whitewater	23
Central (IA)	24
Redlands	14

Quarterfinals; Campus Sites
Hofstra	38
Trenton State	3
Washington & Jefferson	0
Lycoming	24
Dayton	23
Allegheny	31
St. Thomas (MN)	32
Central (IA)	33

Semifinals; Campus Sites
Hofstra	10
Lycoming	20
Allegheny	24
Central (IA)	7

National Championship Game; Hawkins Stadium; Bradenton, Florida
Lycoming	14
Allegheny	21*

== See also ==
- 1990 NCAA Division I-A football season
- 1990 NCAA Division I-AA football season
- 1990 NCAA Division II football season
